= 1981 Atlanta Falcons season =

NFL team season

- Owner: Rankin M. Smith Sr.
- General manager: Eddie LeBaron
- Head coach: Leeman Bennett
- Home stadium: Fulton County Stadium

Results
- Record: 7–9
- Division place: 2nd NFC West
- Playoffs: Did not qualify
- Pro Bowlers: RB William Andrews; QB Steve Bartkowski; WR Alfred Jenkins; C Jeff van Note; T Mike Kenn; TE Junior Miller; G R. C. Thielemann

The 1981 Atlanta Falcons season was the Falcons' 16th season. The Falcons got off to a solid 3–0 start, but lost three key starters for the season in a 34–17 win at Fulton County Stadium over the San Francisco 49ers. The Falcons would go on to finish the season with a 7–9 record, losing seven games by five points or less, thus missing the playoffs for the first time since 1979.

== Offseason ==
=== NFL draft ===
1981 Atlanta Falcons draft
Round	Pick	Player	Position	College	Notes
1	25	Bobby Butler	Cornerback	Florida State	
Made roster

== Personnel ==
=== Staff ===
1981 Atlanta Falcons staff
Front office: Chairman of the board – Rankin M. Smith Sr.; President – Rankin M. Smith, Jr.; General manager – Eddie LeBaron; Director of player personnel – Tom Braatz; Head coaches: Head coach – Leeman Bennett; Offensive coaches: Quarterbacks – Dick Wood; Offensive backs – John North; Receivers – Jimmy Raye; Offensive line – Bill Walsh	Defensive coaches: Defensive coordinator – Jerry Glanville; Defensive line – Jim Stanley; Linebackers – Doug Shively

=== Roster ===
1981 Atlanta Falcons roster
Quarterbacks (QB): 10 Steve Bartkowski; 14 June Jones; 15 Mike Moroski; Running backs (RB): 31 William Andrews; 21 Lynn Cain; 39 James Mayberry; 33 Bo Robinson; 25 Ray Strong; Wide receivers (WR): 89 Wallace Francis; 85 Alfred Jackson; 84 Alfred Jenkins; 16 Reggie Smith; Tight ends (TE): 87 Russ Mikeska; 80 Junior Miller	Offensive linemen (OL): 66 Warren Bryant T; 64 Pat Howell G; 78 Mike Kenn T; 67 Eric Sanders T; 70 Dave Scott G; 61 John Scully C; 68 R. C. Thielemann G; 57 Jeff Van Note C; Defensive linemen (DL): 74 Wilson Faumuina DE; 75 Jeff Merrow DE; 65 Don Smith NT; 72 Matthew Teague DE; 79 Jeff Yeates DE; 63 Mike Zele NT	Linebackers (LB): 50 Buddy Curry ILB; 59 Paul Davis OLB; 55 Tony Daykin ILB; 54 Fulton Kuykendall ILB; 51 Jim Laughlin OLB; 56 Al Richardson OLB; 52 Lyman White OLB; Defensive backs (DB): 23 Bobby Butler CB; 34 Blane Gaison FS; 36 Bob Glazebrook SS; 37 Kenny Johnson CB; 20 Earl Jones CB; 45 Tom Moriarty SS; 27 Tom Pridemore FS; 30 Scott Woerner CB/S; Special teams (ST): 6 John James P; 18 Mick Luckhurst K	Reserve: 83 Floyd Hodge WR (IR); 22 Rolland Lawrence CB (IR); 53 Neal Musser LB (IR); 62 Harry Stanback DE (IR); 58 Joel Williams LB (IR); Rookies in italics

== Regular season ==
=== Schedule ===
Week	Date	Opponent	Result	Record	Venue	Attendance
1	September 6	**New Orleans Saints**	**W** 27–0	1–0	Atlanta–Fulton County Stadium	57,406
2	September 13	at Green Bay Packers	**W** 31–17	2–0	Lambeau Field	55,382
3	September 20	**San Francisco 49ers**	**W** 34–17	3–0	Atlanta–Fulton County Stadium	56,653
4	September 27	at Cleveland Browns	**L** 17–28	3–1	Cleveland Municipal Stadium	78,283
5	October 5	at Philadelphia Eagles	**L** 13–16	3–2	Veterans Stadium	71,488
6	October 11	**Los Angeles Rams**	**L** 35–37	3–3	Atlanta–Fulton County Stadium	57,841
7	October 18	St. Louis Cardinals	**W** 41–20	4–3	Atlanta–Fulton County Stadium	51,428
8	October 25	New York Giants	**L** 24–27	4–4	Atlanta–Fulton County Stadium	48,410
9	November 1	at **New Orleans Saints**	**W** 41–10	5–4	Louisiana Superdome	63,637
10	November 8	at **San Francisco 49ers**	**L** 14–17	5–5	Candlestick Park	59,127
11	November 15	Pittsburgh Steelers	**L** 20–34	5–6	Atlanta–Fulton County Stadium	57,485
12	November 23	Minnesota Vikings	**W** 31–30	6–6	Atlanta–Fulton County Stadium	54,086
13	November 29	at Houston Oilers	**W** 31–27	7–6	Houston Astrodome	40,201
14	December 6	at Tampa Bay Buccaneers	**L** 23–24	7–7	Tampa Stadium	69,221
15	December 14	at **Los Angeles Rams**	**L** 16–21	7–8	Anaheim Stadium	57,054
16	December 20	Cincinnati Bengals	**L** 28–30	7–9	Atlanta–Fulton County Stadium	35,972
Note: Intra-division opponents are in **bold** text.

=== Standings ===
NFC West
	W	L	T	PCT	DIV	CONF	PF	PA	STK
^{(1)} San Francisco 49ers	13	3	0	.813	5–1	10-2	357	250	W5
Atlanta Falcons	7	9	0	.438	3–3	6–6	426	355	L3
Los Angeles Rams	6	10	0	.375	2–4	5–7	303	351	L1
New Orleans Saints	4	12	0	.250	2–4	2–10	207	378	L4

== Awards and records ==
- Steve Bartkowski, Falcons game record, most passing yards in one game, 416 yards (on November 15, 1981)
- William Andrews, Falcons game record, most receiving yards in one game, 198 yards (on November 15, 1981). Which was later broken by Roddy White when he got 210 yards against the 49ers in the 2009 season.
