= 1982 Atlanta Falcons season =

NFL team season

- General manager: Tom Braatz
- Head coach: Leeman Bennett
- Defensive coordinator: Jerry Glanville
- Home stadium: Fulton County Stadium

Results
- Record: 5–4
- Division place: 5th NFC (1st NFC West)
- Playoffs: Lost Wild Card Playoffs (at Vikings) 24–30
- Pro Bowlers: C Jeff van Note; G R. C. Thielemann; T Mike Kenn; FB William Andrews

The 1982 Atlanta Falcons season was the franchise's 17th season in the National Football League (NFL). The team qualified for the postseason and won the NFC West for the second time in three years. Due to the players strike, this was not recognized as divisions were dissolved for this year only. As the lone NFC West team to qualify for the playoffs, Falcons were considered the 1982 first place team when 1983 matchups were determined. The Falcons were the first team to get a taste of being the best in the NFC West during the 49ers' dynasty, as the 49ers, from 1981 to 1997, would hog 13 of 17 NFC West pennants.

== Offseason ==
=== NFL draft ===
1982 Atlanta Falcons draft
Round	Pick	Player	Position	College	Notes
1	9	Gerald Riggs *	Running back	Arizona State	
2	36	Doug Rogers	Defensive end	Stanford	
3	63	Stacey Bailey	Wide receiver	San Jose State	
4	95	Reggie Brown	Running back	Oregon	
5	122	Von Mansfield	Defensive back	Wisconsin	
6	149	Mike Kelley	Quarterback	Georgia Tech	
7	176	David Toloumu	Running back	Hawaii	
8	203	Ricky Eberhardt	Defensive back	Morris Brown	
9	235	Mike Horan	Punter	Long Beach State	
10	262	Curtis Stowers	Linebacker	Mississippi State	
11	288	Jeff Keller	Wide receiver	Washington State	
12	315	Dave Levenick	Linebacker	Wisconsin	
Made roster * Made at least one Pro Bowl during career

== Personnel ==
=== Staff ===
1982 Atlanta Falcons staff
Front office: Chairman of the board – Rankin M. Smith Sr.; President – Rankin M. Smith, Jr.; Executive vice president/chief operating officer – Eddie LeBaron; General manager – Tom Braatz; Head coaches: Head coach – Leeman Bennett; Offensive coaches: Quarterbacks – Dick Wood; Offensive backs – John North; Receivers – Jimmy Raye; Offensive line – Bill Walsh	Defensive coaches: Defensive coordinator – Jerry Glanville; Defensive line – Jim Stanley; Linebackers – Doug Shively

=== Roster ===
1982 Atlanta Falcons roster
Quarterbacks (QB): 10 Steve Bartkowski; 14 Jeff Komlo; 15 Mike Moroski; Running backs (RB): 31 William Andrews; 46 Reggie Brown; 21 Lynn Cain; 42 Gerald Riggs; 33 Bo Robinson; 25 Ray Strong; Wide receivers (WR): 82 Stacey Bailey; 89 William Curran; 83 Floyd Hodge; 85 Alfred Jackson; 84 Alfred Jenkins; 81 Billy Johnson; Tight ends (TE): 99 Clay Brown; 88 Keith Krepfle; 80 Junior Miller	Offensive linemen (OL): 66 Warren Bryant T; 64 Pat Howell G; 78 Mike Kenn T; 67 Eric Sanders T; 70 Dave Scott G; 61 John Scully C; 68 R. C. Thielemann G; 57 Jeff Van Note C; Defensive linemen (DL): 75 Jeff Merrow DE; 71 Mike Perko DE; 77 Doug Rogers DE; 65 Don Smith NT; 79 Jeff Yeates DE; 63 Mike Zele NT	Linebackers (LB): 50 Buddy Curry ILB; 59 Paul Davis OLB; 62 Robert Jackson ILB; 54 Fulton Kuykendall ILB; 51 Jim Laughlin ILB; 53 Neal Musser ILB; 56 Al Richardson OLB; 58 Joel Williams OLB; Defensive backs (DB): 23 Bobby Butler CB; 34 Blane Gaison FS; 36 Bob Glazebrook SS; 37 Kenny Johnson CB; 20 Earl Jones CB; 27 Tom Pridemore FS; 47 Mike Spivey CB; Special teams (ST): 18 Mick Luckhurst K; 12 George Roberts P	Reserve: 55 Tony Daykin LB (IR); 86 Jeffrey Keller WR (IR); -- Dave Levenick LB (IR); 87 Russ Mikeska TE (IR); 90 Mark Millwood WR (IR); 52 Lyman White LB (IR); Rookies in italics

== Regular season ==
=== Schedule ===
Week	Date	Opponent	Result	Record	Game site	Attendance	Game recap
1	September 12	at New York Giants	**W** 16–14	1–0	Giants Stadium	74,286	Recap
2	September 19	Los Angeles Raiders	**L** 14–38	1–1	Atlanta–Fulton County Stadium	54,774	Recap
3	—N/a	at Kansas City Chiefs	**Cancelled due to the 1982 NFL strike †**				
4	—N/a	San Diego Chargers	**Cancelled due to the 1982 NFL strike †**				
5	—N/a	at **Los Angeles Rams**	**Cancelled due to the 1982 NFL strike †**				
6	—N/a	at Detroit Lions	**Cancelled due to the 1982 NFL strike †**				
7	—N/a	**San Francisco 49ers**	**Cancelled due to the 1982 NFL strike †**				
8	—N/a	at **New Orleans Saints**	Rescheduled to January 2				
9	—N/a	at Chicago Bears	**Cancelled due to the 1982 NFL strike †**				
10	—N/a	Philadelphia Eagles	**Cancelled due to the 1982 NFL strike †**				
11	November 21	**Los Angeles Rams**	**W** 34–17	2–1	Atlanta–Fulton County Stadium	39,686	Recap
12	November 28	St. Louis Cardinals	**L** 20–23	2–2	Atlanta–Fulton County Stadium	33,411	Recap
13	December 5	at Denver Broncos	**W** 34–27	3–2	Mile High Stadium	73,984	Recap
14	December 12	**New Orleans Saints**	**W** 35–0	4–2	Atlanta–Fulton County Stadium	39,535	Recap
15	December 19	at **San Francisco 49ers**	**W** 17–7	5–2	Candlestick Park	53,234	Recap
16	December 26	Green Bay Packers	**L** 7–38	5–3	Atlanta–Fulton County Stadium	50,245	Recap
17	January 2, 1983	at **New Orleans Saints**	**L** 6–35	5–4	Louisiana Superdome	47,336	Recap
Note: Intra-division opponents are in **bold** text.

== Playoffs ==
Round	Date	Opponent (seed)	Result	Record	Game site	Attendance	Game recap
Wild Card	January 9	at Minnesota Vikings (4)	L 24–30	0–1	Hubert H. Humphrey Metrodome	60,560	Recap

== Standings ==
NFC West
	W	L	T	PCT	DIV	CONF	PF	PA	STK
^{(5)} Atlanta Falcons	5	4	0	.556	3–1	4–3	183	199	L2
New Orleans Saints	4	5	0	.444	2–1	3–5	129	160	W1
San Francisco 49ers	3	6	0	.333	1–3	2–3	209	206	L1
Los Angeles Rams	2	7	0	.222	1–2	1–5	200	250	W1

NFC
#	Team	W	L	T	PCT	PF	PA	STK
Seeded postseason qualifiers
1	Washington Redskins	8	1	0	.889	190	128	W4
2	Dallas Cowboys	6	3	0	.667	226	145	L2
3	Green Bay Packers	5	3	1	.611	226	169	L1
4 (Note: Minnesota (4–1), Atlanta (4–3), St. Louis (5–4), Tampa Bay (3–3) seeds were determined by best won-lost record in conference games.)	Minnesota Vikings	5	4	0	.556	187	198	W1
5	Atlanta Falcons	5	4	0	.556	183	199	L2
6	St. Louis Cardinals	5	4	0	.556	135	170	L1
7	Tampa Bay Buccaneers	5	4	0	.556	158	178	W3
8 (Note: Detroit finished ahead of New Orleans and the N.Y. Giants based on best conference record (4–4 to Saints’ 3–5 to Giants’ 3–5).)	Detroit Lions	4	5	0	.444	181	176	W1
Did not qualify for the postseason
9	New Orleans Saints	4	5	0	.444	129	160	W1
10	New York Giants	4	5	0	.444	164	160	W1
11 (Note: San Francisco finished ahead of Chicago, and Chicago finished ahead of Philadelphia, based on conference record (49ers’ 2–3 to Bears’ 2–5 to Eagles’ 1–5).)	San Francisco 49ers	3	6	0	.333	209	206	L1
12	Chicago Bears	3	6	0	.333	141	174	L1
13	Philadelphia Eagles	3	6	0	.333	191	195	L1
14	Los Angeles Rams	2	7	0	.222	200	250	W1
Tiebreakers
