= 1980 Atlanta Falcons season =

NFL team season

- Owner: Rankin M. Smith Sr.
- General manager: Eddie LeBaron
- Head coach: Leeman Bennett
- Defensive coordinator: Jerry Glanville
- Home stadium: Fulton County Stadium

Results
- Record: 12–4
- Division place: 1st NFC West
- Playoffs: Lost Divisional Playoffs (vs. Cowboys) 27–30
- Pro Bowlers: RB William Andrews; QB Steve Bartkowski; WR Alfred Jenkins; C Jeff van Note; T Mike Kenn; TE Junior Miller

The 1980 Atlanta Falcons season was the Falcons' 15th season and culminated in their first division title in franchise history. After a 3–3 start, the Falcons went on a nine-game winning streak as quarterback Steve Bartkowski passed for a career-best 3,544 yards while connecting on 31 touchdown passes. As the NFC's top seed, the Falcons gained home-field advantage throughout the playoffs. The Falcons' season ended with a 30–27 divisional playoff loss to the Dallas Cowboys before 60,022 fans at Fulton County Stadium.

This would be the last time the Falcons capture a winning record in a non strike season until 1991, as well as their last division title until 1998.

== Offseason ==
=== Draft ===
1980 Atlanta Falcons draft
| Round | Pick | Player | Position | College | Notes |
| 1 | 7 | Junior Miller * | Tight end | Nebraska | |
| 2 | 36 | Buddy Curry | Linebacker | North Carolina | |
| 3 | 63 | Earl Jones | Cornerback | Norfolk State | |
| 4 | 91 | Jim Laughlin | Linebacker | Ohio State | |
| 4 | 104 | I. M. Hipp | Running back | Nebraska | |
| 5 | 117 | Brad Vassar | Linebacker | Pacific | |
| 5 | 137 | Kenny Johnson | Safety | Mississippi State | |
| 6 | 146 | Mike Davis | Safety | Colorado | |
| 7 | 172 | Mike Smith | Wide receiver | Grambling State | |
| 8 | 201 | Al Richardson | Linebacker | Georgia Tech | |
| 9 | 228 | Glen Keller | Center | West Texas State | |
| 10 | 257 | Walt Bellamy | Safety | VMI | |
| 11 | 284 | Mike Babb | Safety | Oklahoma | |
| 12 | 313 | Quinn Jones | Running back | Tulsa | |
Made roster * Made at least one Pro Bowl during career

=== Undrafted free agents ===
1980 undrafted free agents of note
| Player | Position | College |
|---|---|---|
| Keith Edwards | Safety | Minnesota |
| Al Futrell | Cornerback | TCU |
| Reggie Smith | Wide receiver | North Carolina Central |

== Personnel ==
=== Staff ===
1980 Atlanta Falcons staff
| Front office: Chairman of the board – Rankin M. Smith Sr.; President – Rankin M. Smith, Jr.; General manager – Eddie LeBaron; Director of player personnel – Tom Braatz; Head coaches: Head coach – Leeman Bennett; Offensive coaches: Quarterbacks – Dick Wood; Offensive backs – John North; Receivers – Jimmy Raye; Offensive line – Bill Walsh | Defensive coaches: Defensive coordinator – Jerry Glanville; Defensive line – Jim Stanley; Linebackers – Doug Shively |

=== Roster ===
1980 Atlanta Falcons roster
| Quarterbacks (QB): 10 Steve Bartkowski; 9 Larry Fortner; 15 Mike Moroski; Running backs (RB): 33 Anthony Anderson; 31 William Andrews; 21 Lynn Cain; 39 James Mayberry; 25 Ray Strong; Wide receivers (WR): 89 Wallace Francis; 85 Alfred Jackson; 84 Alfred Jenkins; 86 Mike Smith; Tight ends (TE): 87 Russ Mikeska; 80 Junior Miller | Offensive linemen (OL): 66 Warren Bryant T; 53 Chuck Correal C; 64 Pat Howell G; 78 Mike Kenn T; 73 Phil McKinnely T; 70 Dave Scott G; 68 R. C. Thielemann G; 57 Jeff Van Note C; Defensive linemen (DL): 74 Wilson Faumuina DT; 77 Edgar Fields DT; 75 Jeff Merrow DE; 65 Don Smith NT; 79 Jeff Yeates DE; 63 Mike Zele DT | Linebackers (LB): 50 Buddy Curry ILB; 55 Tony Daykin OLB; 54 Fulton Kuykendall ILB; 51 Jim Laughlin ILB; 52 Dewey McClain ILB; 59 Robert Pennywell ILB; 56 Al Richardson OLB; 58 Joel Williams; Defensive backs (DB): 38 Rick Byas CB; 36 Bob Glazebrook SS; 37 Kenny Johnson CB; 20 Earl Jones CB; 22 Rolland Lawrence CB; 27 Tom Pridemore FS; 28 Frank Reed SS; Special teams (ST): 6 John James P; 4 Tim Mazzetti K | Reserve: 44 Bubba Bean RB (IR); 32 Ray Easterling S (IR); 61 Chuck Herman G (IR); 40 Michael Higgins RB (IR); 14 June Jones QB (IR); 26 James McDougald RB (IR); 81 Dennis Pearson WR (IR); 82 Billy Ryckman WR (IR); 16 Reggie Smith WR (IR); 72 Matthew Teague DE (IR); 99 Brad Vassar LB (Left squad); Rookies in italics |

== Regular season ==
=== Schedule ===
| Week | Date | Opponent | Result | Record | Venue | Attendance | Recap |
|---|---|---|---|---|---|---|---|
| 1 | September 7 | at Minnesota Vikings | **L** 23–24 | 0–1 | Metropolitan Stadium | 44,773 | Recap |
| 2 | September 14 | at New England Patriots | **W** 37–21 | 1–1 | Schaefer Stadium | 48,321 | Recap |
| 3 | September 21 | Miami Dolphins | **L** 17–20 | 1–2 | Atlanta–Fulton County Stadium | 55,470 | Recap |
| 4 | September 28 | at **San Francisco 49ers** | **W** 20–17 | 2–2 | Candlestick Park | 56,518 | Recap |
| 5 | October 5 | Detroit Lions | **W** 43–28 | 3–2 | Atlanta–Fulton County Stadium | 57,652 | Recap |
| 6 | October 12 | New York Jets | **L** 7–14 | 3–3 | Atlanta–Fulton County Stadium | 57,458 | Recap |
| 7 | October 19 | at **New Orleans Saints** | **W** 41–14 | 4–3 | Louisiana Superdome | 62,651 | Recap |
| 8 | October 26 | **Los Angeles Rams** | **W** 13–10 | 5–3 | Atlanta–Fulton County Stadium | 57,401 | Recap |
| 9 | November 2 | at Buffalo Bills | **W** 30–14 | 6–3 | Rich Stadium | 57,959 | Recap |
| 10 | November 9 | at St. Louis Cardinals | **W** 33–27 (OT) | 7–3 | Busch Memorial Stadium | 48,662 | Recap |
| 11 | November 16 | **New Orleans Saints** | **W** 31–13 | 8–3 | Atlanta–Fulton County Stadium | 53,871 | Recap |
| 12 | November 23 | Chicago Bears | **W** 28–17 | 9–3 | Atlanta–Fulton County Stadium | 49,156 | Recap |
| 13 | November 30 | Washington Redskins | **W** 10–6 | 10–3 | Atlanta–Fulton County Stadium | 55,665 | Recap |
| 14 | December 7 | at Philadelphia Eagles | **W** 20–17 | 11–3 | Veterans Stadium | 70,205 | Recap |
| 15 | December 14 | **San Francisco 49ers** | **W** 35–10 | 12–3 | Atlanta–Fulton County Stadium | 55,767 | Recap |
| 16 | December 21 | at **Los Angeles Rams** | **L** 17–20 (OT) | 12–4 | Anaheim Stadium | 62,469 | Recap |
Note: Intra-division opponents are in **bold** text.

=== Game summaries ===
==== Week 1 ====
| Team | 1 | 2 | 3 | 4 | Total |
|---|---|---|---|---|---|
| Falcons | 6 | 0 | 7 | 10 | 23 |
| • Vikings | 7 | 7 | 7 | 3 | 24 |

- Date: September 7
- Location: Metropolitan Stadium

==== Week 2 ====
| Team | 1 | 2 | 3 | 4 | Total |
|---|---|---|---|---|---|
| • Falcons | 14 | 14 | 3 | 6 | 37 |
| Patriots | 7 | 14 | 0 | 0 | 21 |

- Date: September 14
- Location: Sullivan Stadium
- Referee: Fred Wyant
- TV announcers (CBS): Gary Bender and John Madden

==== Week 3 ====
| Team | 1 | 2 | 3 | 4 | Total |
|---|---|---|---|---|---|
| • Dolphins | 3 | 0 | 0 | 17 | 20 |
| Falcons | 0 | 7 | 7 | 3 | 17 |

- Date: September 21
- Location: Atlanta-Fulton County Stadium
- Referee: Bob McElwee
- TV announcers (NBC): Marv Albert and Dave Rowe

==== Week 4 ====
| Team | 1 | 2 | 3 | 4 | Total |
|---|---|---|---|---|---|
| • Falcons | 3 | 0 | 3 | 14 | 20 |
| 49ers | 0 | 3 | 0 | 14 | 17 |

- Date: September 28
- Location: Candlestick Park
- Referee: Bob Frederic
- TV announcers (CBS): Vin Scully and George Allen

==== Week 5 ====
| Team | 1 | 2 | 3 | 4 | Total |
|---|---|---|---|---|---|
| Lions | 3 | 3 | 0 | 22 | 28 |
| • Falcons | 17 | 17 | 2 | 7 | 43 |

- Date: October 5
- Location: Atlanta-Fulton County Stadium
- Referee: Dick Jorgensen
- Television network: CBS

==== Week 6 ====
| Team | 1 | 2 | 3 | 4 | Total |
|---|---|---|---|---|---|
| • Jets | 7 | 0 | 0 | 7 | 14 |
| Falcons | 0 | 0 | 0 | 7 | 7 |

- Date: October 12
- Location: Atlanta-Fulton County Stadium
- Referee: Gordon McCarter
- Television network: NBC

==== Week 7 ====
| Team | 1 | 2 | 3 | 4 | Total |
|---|---|---|---|---|---|
| • Falcons | 7 | 6 | 21 | 7 | 41 |
| Saints | 7 | 7 | 0 | 0 | 14 |

- Date: October 19
- Location: Louisiana Superdome
- Game start: 1:00 p.m.
- Game weather: Indoors (dome)
- Referee: Jerry Seeman
- TV announcers (CBS): Jim Kelly and Sonny Jurgenson

Scoring summary
| Q1 | NO | Chandler 18 yard pass from Manning (Ricardo kick) | NO 7–0 |
| Q1 | ATL | Miller 11 yard pass from Bartkowski (Mazzetti kick) | Tie 7–7 |
| Q2 | NO | Galbreath 15 yard pass from Manning (Ricardo kick) | NO 14–7 |
| Q2 | ATL | Francis 24 yard pass from Bartkowski (kick failed) | NO 14–13 |
| Q3 | ATL | Jenkins 49 yard pass from Bartkowski (Mazzetti kick) | ATL 20–14 |
| Q3 | ATL | Cain 1 yard run (Mazzetti kick) | ATL 27–14 |
| Q3 | ATL | Miller 4 yard pass from Bartkowski (Mazzetti kick) | ATL 34–14 |
| Q4 | ATL | Andrews 13 yard run (Mazzetti kick) | ATL 41–14 |

==== Week 8 ====
| Team | 1 | 2 | 3 | 4 | Total |
|---|---|---|---|---|---|
| Rams | 0 | 3 | 7 | 0 | 10 |
| • Falcons | 6 | 0 | 0 | 7 | 13 |

- Date: October 26
- Location: Atlanta-Fulton County Stadium
- Referee: Jerry Markbreit
- Television network: CBS

==== Week 9 ====
| Team | 1 | 2 | 3 | 4 | Total |
|---|---|---|---|---|---|
| • Falcons | 0 | 10 | 10 | 10 | 30 |
| Bills | 7 | 7 | 0 | 0 | 14 |

- Date: November 2
- Location: Rich Stadium
- Referee: Chuck Heberling
- Television network: CBS

==== Week 10 ====
| Team | 1 | 2 | 3 | 4 | OT | Total |
|---|---|---|---|---|---|---|
| • Falcons | 3 | 3 | 14 | 7 | 6 | 33 |
| Cardinals | 17 | 7 | 3 | 0 | 0 | 27 |

- Date: November 9
- Location: Civic Center Busch Memorial Stadium
- Referee: Fred Silva
- TV announcers (CBS): Pat Summerall and Tom Brookshier

==== Week 11 ====
| Team | 1 | 2 | 3 | 4 | Total |
|---|---|---|---|---|---|
| Saints | 7 | 0 | 0 | 6 | 13 |
| • Falcons | 3 | 7 | 7 | 14 | 31 |

- Date: November 16
- Location: Atlanta-Fulton County Stadium

==== Week 12 ====
| Team | 1 | 2 | 3 | 4 | Total |
|---|---|---|---|---|---|
| Bears | 7 | 3 | 7 | 0 | 17 |
| • Falcons | 0 | 14 | 0 | 14 | 28 |

- Date: November 23
- Location: Atlanta-Fulton County Stadium
- Referee: Fred Wyant
- Television network: CBS

==== Week 13 ====
| Team | 1 | 2 | 3 | 4 | Total |
|---|---|---|---|---|---|
| Redskins | 0 | 3 | 0 | 3 | 6 |
| • Falcons | 0 | 0 | 7 | 3 | 10 |

- Date: November 30
- Location: Atlanta-Fulton County Stadium

==== Week 14 ====
| Team | 1 | 2 | 3 | 4 | Total |
|---|---|---|---|---|---|
| • Falcons | 3 | 7 | 7 | 3 | 20 |
| Eagles | 0 | 14 | 0 | 3 | 17 |

- Date: December 7
- Location: Veterans Stadium
- Referee: Pat Haggerty
- TV announcers (CBS): Gary Bender and John Madden

==== Week 15 ====
| Team | 1 | 2 | 3 | 4 | Total |
|---|---|---|---|---|---|
| 49ers | 0 | 3 | 0 | 7 | 10 |
| • Falcons | 7 | 0 | 14 | 14 | 35 |

- Date: December 14
- Location: Atlanta-Fulton County Stadium

==== Week 16 ====
| Team | 1 | 2 | 3 | 4 | OT | Total |
|---|---|---|---|---|---|---|
| Falcons | 7 | 7 | 0 | 3 | 0 | 17 |
| • Rams | 3 | 0 | 14 | 0 | 3 | 20 |

- Date: December 21
- Location: Anaheim Stadium

=== Playoffs ===
| Round | Date | Opponent (seed) | Result | Venue | Attendance | Recap |
|---|---|---|---|---|---|---|
| Divisional | January 4 | Dallas Cowboys (4) | **L** 27–30 | Atlanta–Fulton County Stadium | 60,022 | Recap |

==== Divisional ====
| Team | 1 | 2 | 3 | 4 | Total |
|---|---|---|---|---|---|
| • Cowboys | 3 | 7 | 0 | 20 | 30 |
| Falcons | 10 | 7 | 7 | 3 | 27 |

- Date: January 4
- Location: Atlanta-Fulton County Stadium

=== Standings ===
NFC West
| | W | L | T | PCT | DIV | CONF | PF | PA | STK |
|---|---|---|---|---|---|---|---|---|---|
| ^{(1)} Atlanta Falcons | 12 | 4 | 0 | .750 | 5–1 | 10–2 | 405 | 272 | L1 |
| ^{(5)} Los Angeles Rams | 11 | 5 | 0 | .688 | 5–1 | 9–3 | 424 | 289 | W2 |
| San Francisco 49ers | 6 | 10 | 0 | .375 | 2–4 | 4–8 | 320 | 415 | L2 |
| New Orleans Saints | 1 | 15 | 0 | .063 | 0–6 | 0–12 | 291 | 487 | L1 |
