= 1979 Atlanta Falcons season =

NFL team season

- Owner: Rankin M. Smith Sr.
- General manager: Eddie LeBaron
- Head coach: Leeman Bennett
- Home stadium: Fulton County Stadium

Results
- Record: 6–10
- Division place: 3rd NFC West
- Playoffs: Did not qualify

The 1979 Atlanta Falcons season was the Falcons' 14th season. The Falcons were trying to improve upon their 9–7 record in 1978 and make it to the playoffs for the second time in team history, their first appearance being the year before. Rookie fullback William Andrews rushed for 167 yards in a 40–34 overtime win over the Saints in the season opener in New Orleans. Andrews set a team record with 1,023 yards, while quarterback Steve Bartkowski became the first Falcon to surpass the 2,000-yard mark with 2,505. However, the Falcons' defense allowed 388 points and the team finished 6–10.

== Offseason ==
=== NFL draft ===
1979 Atlanta Falcons draft
Round	Pick	Player	Position	College	Notes
1	17	Don Smith	Defensive tackle	Miami (FL)	
2	49	Pat Howell	Guard	USC	
3	75	James Mayberry	Running back	Colorado	
3	79	William Andrews *	Running back	Auburn	
4	100	Lynn Cain	Running back	USC	
4	101	Charles Johnson	Defensive back	Grambling State	
5	127	Mike Zele	Nose tackle	Kent State	
6	154	Mike Moroski	Quarterback	UC Davis	
7	186	Roger Westlund	Offensive tackle	Washington	
8	212	Keith Miller	Linebacker	Northeastern State	
9	239	Dave Parkin	Defensive back	Utah State	
10	266	Bruce Beekley	Linebacker	Oregon	
11	292	Bill Leer	Center	Colorado State	
12	323	Stuart Walker	Linebacker	Colorado	
Made roster * Made at least one Pro Bowl during career

=== Undrafted free agents ===
1979 undrafted free agents of note
Player	Position	College
Putt Choate	Linebacker	SMU
Don Lukas	Wide receiver	Michigan Tech

== Personnel ==
=== Staff ===
1979 Atlanta Falcons staff
Front office: Chairman of the board – Rankin M. Smith Sr.; President – Rankin M. Smith, Jr.; General manager – Eddie LeBaron; Director of player personnel – Tom Braatz; Head coaches: Head coach – Leeman Bennett; Offensive coaches: Quarterbacks – Dick Wood; Offensive backs – John North; Receivers – Ted Plumb; Offensive line – Bill Walsh	Defensive coaches: Defensive coordinator – Jerry Glanville; Defensive line – Jim Champion; Linebackers – Doug Shively

=== Roster ===
1979 Atlanta Falcons roster
Quarterbacks (QB): 10 Steve Bartkowski; 9 Larry Fortner; 14 June Jones; 15 Mike Moroski; Running backs (RB): 31 William Andrews; 44 Bubba Bean; 39 James Mayberry; 24 Haskel Stanback; 25 Ray Strong; Wide receivers (WR): 89 Wallace Francis; 85 Alfred Jackson; 84 Alfred Jenkins; 81 Dennis Pearson; 82 Billy Ryckman; Tight ends (TE): 87 Russ Mikeska; 86 Jim Mitchell	Offensive linemen (OL): 66 Warren Bryant T; 61 Chuck Correal C; 64 Pat Howell G; 78 Mike Kenn T; 73 Phil McKinnely T; 53 Paul Ryczek C; 70 Dave Scott G; 57 Jeff Van Note C; Defensive linemen (DL): 74 Wilson Faumuina DT; 77 Edgar Fields DT; 69 Mike Lewis DT; 65 Don Smith DE; 79 Jeff Yeates DE; 63 Mike Zele DT	Linebackers (LB): 50 Greg Brezina OLB; 51 Brian Cabral MLB; 54 Fulton Kuykendall OLB; 56 Ron McCartney OLB; 59 Robert Pennywell MLB; 58 Joel Williams OLB; Defensive backs (DB): 38 Rick Byas CB; 32 Ray Easterling SS; 36 Bob Glazebrook FS; 22 Rolland Lawrence CB; 45 Tom Moriarty SS; 27 Tom Pridemore FS; 33 Mo Spencer CB; Special teams (ST): 6 John James P; 4 Tim Mazzetti K	Reserve: 21 Lynn Cain RB (IR); 48 Putt Choate LB (IR); 55 Tony Daykin LB (IR); 26 Mike Esposito RB (IR); 88 Lewis Gilbert TE (IR); 33 Jerome King CB (IR); 97 Don Lukas WR (IR); 52 Dewey McClain LB (IR); 75 Jeff Merrow DE (IR); 28 Frank Reed S (IR); 68 R.C. Thielemann G (IR); 83 James Wright TE (IR); Rookies in italics

== Regular season ==
=== Schedule ===
Week	Date	Opponent	Result	Record	Venue	Attendance
1	September 2	at **New Orleans Saints**	**W** 40–34	1–0	Louisiana Superdome	70,940
2	September 10	at Philadelphia Eagles	**W** 14–10	2–0	Veterans Stadium	66,935
3	September 16	Denver Broncos	**L** 17–20	2–1	Atlanta–Fulton County Stadium	57,677
4	September 23	at Detroit Lions	**L** 23–24	2–2	Pontiac Silverdome	56,249
5	September 30	Washington Redskins	**L** 7–16	2–3	Atlanta–Fulton County Stadium	56,819
6	October 7	Green Bay Packers	**W** 25–7	3–3	Atlanta–Fulton County Stadium	56,184
7	October 14	at Oakland Raiders	**L** 19–50	3–4	Oakland–Alameda County Coliseum	52,900
8	October 21	at **San Francisco 49ers**	**L** 15–20	3–5	Candlestick Park	33,952
9	October 29	Seattle Seahawks	**L** 28–31	3–6	Atlanta–Fulton County Stadium	52,566
10	November 4	Tampa Bay Buccaneers	**W** 17–14	4–6	Atlanta–Fulton County Stadium	55,150
11	November 11	at New York Giants	**L** 3–24	4–7	Giants Stadium	60,860
12	November 19	at **Los Angeles Rams**	**L** 14–20	4–8	Los Angeles Memorial Coliseum	54,097
13	November 25	**New Orleans Saints**	**L** 6–37	4–9	Atlanta–Fulton County Stadium	42,815
14	December 2	at San Diego Chargers	**W** 28–26	5–9	San Diego Stadium	50,198
15	December 9	**Los Angeles Rams**	**L** 13–34	5–10	Atlanta–Fulton County Stadium	49,236
16	December 16	**San Francisco 49ers**	**W** 31–21	6–10	Atlanta–Fulton County Stadium	37,211
Note: Intra-division opponents are in **bold** text.

=== Standings ===
NFC West
	W	L	T	PCT	DIV	CONF	PF	PA	STK
Los Angeles Rams^{(3)}	9	7	0	.563	5–1	7–5	323	309	L1
New Orleans Saints	8	8	0	.500	4–2	8–4	370	360	W1
Atlanta Falcons	6	10	0	.375	2–4	5–7	300	388	W1
San Francisco 49ers	2	14	0	.125	1–5	2–10	308	416	L1
