= 1983 Atlanta Falcons season =

NFL team season

- General manager: Tom Braatz
- Head coach: Dan Henning
- Home stadium: Fulton County Stadium

Results
- Record: 7–9
- Division place: 4th NFC West
- Playoffs: Did not qualify
- Pro Bowlers: G R. C. Thielemann; T Mike Kenn; FB William Andrews; KR Billy Johnson

The 1983 Atlanta Falcons season was the Falcons’ eighteenth season in the National Football League. The team looked to improve on its 5–4 1982 season and make the playoffs for the second consecutive season. However, the Falcons started out terribly, losing five of their first seven games. The Falcons would finish the season with a 7–9 record in their first season under head coach Dan Henning. This would ultimately prove the first of eight consecutive losing seasons for the Falcons.

== Offseason ==
=== NFL draft ===
1983 Atlanta Falcons draft
Round	Selection	Player	Position	College
1	16	Mike Pitts	DE	Alabama
2	43	Jim Britt	DB	Louisiana State
3	75	Andrew Provence	DT	South Carolina
4	102	John Harper	LB	Southern Illinois
5	129	Brett Miller	OT	Iowa
6	156	Anthony Allen	WR	Washington
7	183	Jeff Turk	DB	Boise State
8	215	John Rade	LB	Boise State
10	268	Ralph Giacomarro	P	Penn State
11	295	John Salley	DB	Wyoming
12	322	Allama Matthews	TE	Vanderbilt

== Personnel ==
=== Staff ===
1983 Atlanta Falcons staff
Front office: Chairman of the board – Rankin M. Smith Sr.; President – Rankin M. Smith, Jr.; Executive vice president/chief operating officer – Eddie LeBaron; General manager – Tom Braatz; Head coaches: Head coach – Dan Henning; Offensive coaches: Quarterbacks/running backs – Steve Crosby; Receivers – Bob Harrison; Offensive line – Bob Fry; Assistant offensive line – Garry Puetz	Defensive coaches: Assistant head coach/defensive line – Dan Sekanovich; Defensive coordinator – John Marshall; Linebackers – Bobby Jackson; Secondary – Jack Christiansen; Special teams coaches: Special teams – Ted Fritsch; Strength and conditioning: Strength and conditioning – George Dostal

=== Roster ===
1983 Atlanta Falcons roster
Quarterbacks (QB): 10 Steve Bartkowski; 15 Mike Moroski; Running backs (RB): 31 William Andrews; 21 Lynn Cain; 42 Gerald Riggs; 33 Bo Robinson; 22 Richard Williams; Wide receivers (WR): 82 Stacey Bailey; 89 William Curran; 83 Floyd Hodge; 81 Billy Johnson; Tight ends (TE): 88 Arthur Cox; 49 Allama Matthews; 80 Junior Miller; 86 Ben Young	Offensive linemen (OL): 66 Warren Bryant T; 71 Dan Dufour C; 70 Ronnie Lee G; 78 Mike Kenn T; 62 Brett Miller T; 67 Eric Sanders T; 61 John Scully G; 68 R. C. Thielemann G; 57 Jeff Van Note C; Defensive linemen (DL): 69 Dan Benish DT; 75 Jeff Merrow DE; 74 Mike Pitts DE; 72 Andrew Provence DT; 65 Don Smith DT; 79 Jeff Yeates DE	Linebackers (LB): 50 Buddy Curry OLB; 51 Rich Dixon OLB; 58 David Frye OLB; 52 John Harper MLB; 54 Fulton Kuykendall MLB; 55 Dave Levenick OLB; 59 John Rade OLB; Defensive backs (DB): 26 James Britt SS; 23 Bobby Butler CB; 34 Blane Gaison FS; 36 Bob Glazebrook SS; 30 Steve Haworth CB; 37 Kenny Johnson CB; 20 Earl Jones CB; 27 Tom Pridemore FS; 43 Tom Tutson CB; Special teams (ST): 1 Ralph Giacomarro P; 18 Mick Luckhurst K	Reserve: 85 Alfred Jackson WR (IR); 84 Alfred Jenkins WR (NF-Inj.); 40 Eddie Meyers RB (Military); 87 Russ Mikeska TE (IR); 53 Neal Musser LB (IR); 56 Al Richardson LB (IR); 4 George Roberts P (IR); 73 Mike Simeta DT (IR); 63 Mike Zele DT (IR); Rookies in italics

== Regular season ==
=== Schedule ===
Week	Date	Opponent	Result	Record	Venue	Attendance
1	September 4	at Chicago Bears	**W** 20–17	1–0	Soldier Field	60,165
2	September 11	New York Giants	**L** 13–16	1–1	Atlanta–Fulton County Stadium	58,075
3	September 18	at Detroit Lions	**W** 30–14	2–1	Pontiac Silverdome	54,622
4	September 25	at **San Francisco 49ers**	**L** 20–24	2–2	Candlestick Park	57,814
5	October 2	Philadelphia Eagles	**L** 24–28	2–3	Atlanta–Fulton County Stadium	50,621
6	October 9	**New Orleans Saints**	**L** 17–19	2–4	Atlanta–Fulton County Stadium	51,654
7	October 16	at **Los Angeles Rams**	**L** 21–27	2–5	Anaheim Stadium	50,404
8	October 23	at New York Jets	**W** 27–21	3–5	Shea Stadium	46,878
9	October 30	New England Patriots	**W** 24–13	4–5	Atlanta–Fulton County Stadium	47,546
10	November 6	at **New Orleans Saints**	**L** 10–27	4–6	Louisiana Superdome	67,062
11	November 14	**Los Angeles Rams**	**L** 13–36	4–7	Atlanta–Fulton County Stadium	31,202
12	November 20	**San Francisco 49ers**	**W** 28–24	5–7	Atlanta–Fulton County Stadium	39,782
13	November 27	Green Bay Packers	**W** 47–41	6–7	Atlanta–Fulton County Stadium	35,688
14	December 4	at Washington Redskins	**L** 21–37	6–8	RFK Stadium	52,074
15	December 10	at Miami Dolphins	**L** 24–31	6–9	Miami Orange Bowl	56,725
16	December 18	Buffalo Bills	**W** 31–14	7–9	Atlanta–Fulton County Stadium	31,015
Note: Intra-division opponents are in **bold** text.

=== Standings ===
NFC West
	W	L	T	PCT	DIV	CONF	PF	PA	STK
San Francisco 49ers^{(2)}	10	6	0	.625	4–2	8–4	432	293	W3
Los Angeles Rams^{(5)}	9	7	0	.563	5–1	8–4	361	344	W1
New Orleans Saints	8	8	0	.500	2–4	7–5	319	337	L1
Atlanta Falcons	7	9	0	.438	1–5	4–8	370	389	W1
