= Lynn Cain =

American football player and coach (born 1955)

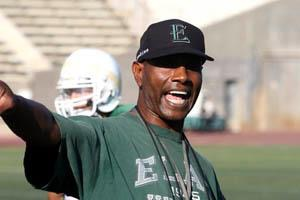

No. 21, 31
- Position: Running back

Personal information
- Born: October 16, 1955 (age 71); Los Angeles, California, U.S.
- Listed height: 6 ft 1 in (1.85 m)
- Listed weight: 205 lb (93 kg)

Career information
- High school: Theodore Roosevelt (CA)
- College: USC
- NFL draft: 1979: 4th round, 100th overall pick

Career history
- Atlanta Falcons (1979–1984); Los Angeles Rams (1985)

Awards and highlights
- National champion (1978)

Career NFL statistics
- Rushing yards: 2,309
- Rushing average: 3.8
- Rushing touchdowns: 19
- Stats at Pro Football Reference

Lynn Dwight Cain (born October 16, 1955) is an American football coach and former running back in the National Football League (NFL).

== College career ==
After winning All Eastern League Defensive Back with the Roosevelt Roughriders in High School, Cain went to East Los Angeles College who'd just finished with a 1–9 season record. Cain finished with ELAC celebrating their first California Community College State 1974 Championship season with a 9–1 record, named the California Community College Player of the Year, Southern Conference MVP and the D1 most sought after Junior College Player with Conference Rushing Record of 1666 yards / 19 TD's.

Cain played college football at the University of Southern California after transferring from East Los Angeles College.

Lynn Cain was starting fullback for 1978 USC Trojans, who won the National Title that year. Sharing the backfield with Lynn was Heisman Trophy winner Charles White.

== Professional career ==
Cain played for the National Football League's Atlanta Falcons from 1979 to 1984 and for the Los Angeles Rams in 1985. He was drafted in the fourth round of the 1979 NFL draft. He managed to have his best year in the NFL in his second season, 1980, rushing for over 900 yards and 8 touchdowns. Lynn wore #21 for the Falcons, and took the Falcons to the 1980 NFC Divisional Playoff Game (The Philadelphia Eagles defeated the Dallas Cowboys 20–7 in the NFC Championship), along with William Andrews and Steve Bartkowski.

== NFL career statistics ==
Legend
**Bold**	Career high

=== Regular season ===
Year	Team	Games		Rushing					Receiving				
Year	Team	GP	GS	Att	Yds	Avg	Lng	TD	Rec	Yds	Avg	Lng	TD
1979	ATL	10	2	63	295	**4.7**	35	2	15	181	**12.1**	28	**2**
1980	ATL	**16**	**16**	**235**	**914**	3.9	**37**	**8**	24	223	9.3	**30**	1
1981	ATL	**16**	**16**	156	542	3.5	35	4	**55**	**421**	7.7	28	**2**
1982	ATL	9	9	54	173	3.2	8	1	13	101	7.8	17	1
1983	ATL	**16**	0	19	63	3.3	10	1	3	24	8.0	11	0
1984	ATL	15	2	77	276	3.6	31	3	12	87	7.3	18	0
1985	RAM	7	1	11	46	4.2	9	0	5	24	4.8	13	0
		89	46	615	2,309	3.8	37	19	127	1,061	8.4	30	6

=== Playoffs ===
Year	Team	Games		Rushing					Receiving				
Year	Team	GP	GS	Att	Yds	Avg	Lng	TD	Rec	Yds	Avg	Lng	TD
1980	ATL	**1**	**1**	**13**	**43**	3.3	11	**1**	**2**	**20**	10.0	**14**	0
1982	ATL	**1**	0	3	17	**5.7**	**13**	0	1	14	**14.0**	**14**	0
		2	1	16	60	3.8	13	1	3	34	11.3	14	0

== Coaching career ==
Cain's experience in many facets of coaching football, after his professional football career, he was hired as the Head Football Coach in December 2007, for ELAC's Huskies. As the head coach for his junior college alma mater, East Los Angeles College, he brought back the tradition of winning and community pride. He coached at ELAC through the 2011 football season. That year they won their division's Championship. The last time East Los Angeles had won a championship was when Cain was the MVP player on the same field at Weingart Stadium (37 years prior). After a call from the community, he is currently revitalizing the Los Angeles Southwest College football team, after the global pandemic.

== Personal life ==
Cain is the uncle of singer and rapper will.i.am.

Lynn talked about the search for his missing father, Rogest Cain, on a 1988 episode of Unsolved Mysteries.

He is married to Lisa Gordon Cain, a humanitarian, and they have three children together - son Lynell Cain and daughters Desiree Jacobs and Ariyana Bragge.

The couple also have six grandchildren - Angelyne, Damon and Raven Cain, and David and Dawson Jacobs and Koa Bragge.
