= Kellen Winslow =

American football player (born 1957)

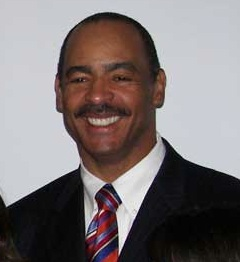
- Winslow in 2008

No. 80
- Position: Tight end

Personal information
- Born: November 5, 1957 (age 69); East St. Louis, Illinois, U.S.
- Listed height: 6 ft 5 in (1.96 m)
- Listed weight: 251 lb (114 kg)

Career information
- High school: East St. Louis Senior
- College: Missouri (1975–1978)
- NFL draft: 1979: 1st round, 13th overall pick

Career history

Playing
- San Diego Chargers (1979–1987)

Operations
- Central State (OH) (2008–2012) Athletic director; Lakeland (2012–2013) Athletic director; Florida A&M (2014) Athletic director

Awards and highlights
- 3× First-team All-Pro (1980–1982); Second-team All-Pro (1987); 5× Pro Bowl (1980–1983, 1987); 2× NFL receptions leader (1980, 1981); NFL 1980s All-Decade Team; NFL 75th Anniversary All-Time Team; NFL 100th Anniversary All-Time Team; Los Angeles Chargers No. 80 retired; Los Angeles Chargers Hall of Fame; Consensus All-American (1978); 2× First-team All-Big Eight (1977, 1978); Second-team All-Big Eight (1976); Missouri Tigers No. 83 retired

Career NFL statistics
- Receptions: 541
- Receiving yards: 6,741
- Receiving touchdowns: 45
- Stats at Pro Football Reference
- Pro Football Hall of Fame
- College Football Hall of Fame

Kellen Boswell Winslow Sr. (born November 5, 1957) is an American former professional football player who was a tight end in the National Football League (NFL). A member of the Pro Football Hall of Fame (1995), he is widely recognized as one of the greatest tight ends in the league's history. Winslow played his entire NFL career (1979–1987) with the San Diego Chargers after being selected in the first round of the 1979 NFL draft. He played college football for the Missouri Tigers, earning consensus All-American honors in 1978. He was inducted into the College Football Hall of Fame in 2002.

Winslow had a late start to his football career, not playing until his senior year of high school. Noted for his unusual combination of size and speed, he was recruited by the Missouri Tigers, where he played from 1975 to 1978, ranking among the team's reception leaders during his last two seasons. He was named All-American as a senior, entering the NFL draft as one of the highest-regarded prospects for the league.

San Diego traded up to draft Winslow with the 13th overall pick in the draft. Over the next nine seasons, he was named a first-team All-Pro three times and a Pro Bowler five times. After a promising rookie season (1979) was ended by injury, Winslow became a key figure in head coach Don Coryell's offense from 1980 to 1983, twice leading the league in receptions. His success in the passing game had long-term effects on the usage of tight ends, who had previously been perceived as good blockers who would catch occasionally. Highlights for Winslow included a five-touchdown performance against the Oakland Raiders and a starring role in the 1981 playoff game known as the Epic in Miami.

Winslow was progressing at a record-breaking pace in 1984 when a serious knee injury knocked him out of the game for a year. He recovered enough to play from 1985 to 1987, but generally failed to recapture his pre-injury form. Winslow planned to return for a tenth year in the league but after a single appearance in the 1988 preseason the condition of his knees forced him to retire.

== Early life ==
Winslow was born in East St. Louis, Illinois, on November 5, 1957, the third of seven children. He attended East St. Louis Senior High School and did not play high school football until his senior year. Until then, he was a self-described "nerd" who played chess. (Note: Winslow would later say that his chess experience made it easier to understand football. He found the tight end position comparable to knights.) He tried football as a sophomore, but was discouraged by two-a-days and gave it up after a week. As a junior, he had a job with United Parcel Service (UPS) and had no time for the sport. He was convinced to try football again in his senior year by his coach, Cornelius Perry, who persuaded Winslow that it would fund his college education.

In his solitary year with the East St. Louis Flyers, Winslow caught 17 passes and was voted to the 1974 All-Southwestern Conference first team as an end. The Flyers season ended with an overtime 19–13 defeat by Glenbrook North in the championship game; a tearful Winslow blamed himself after failing to make a difficult catch in the end zone on the game's penultimate play.

== College career ==
The University of Missouri recruited Winslow to play football for the Tigers; head coach Al Onofrio described him as "the best looking future prospect on the East side". Winslow theorized that he had been recruited chiefly because of his size, as his high school statistics had been unremarkable. He played primarily on the junior varsity team in his first year, then saw some action with the Tigers as a sophomore.

Winslow had an increased impact as a junior, increasing his total receptions from 16 to 25. He was a consensus pick for tight end in the 1977 All-Big Eight first team. Entering his senior year, an Associated Press (AP) article described him as "probably the best player" awaiting new head coach Warren Powers; Powers said of Winslow, "his kind don't come along very often". He went on to catch 29 passes in 1978, being voted a consensus All-American and second team All-Big Eight. (Note: Junior Miller was named to the first team.) He finished his college career with 71 receptions for 1,089 yards and 10 touchdowns. In his final game as a Tiger, he added a further touchdown and Missouri defeated Louisiana State University 20–15 in the 1978 Liberty Bowl.

Winslow's college achievements subsequently brought him numerous honors—he has been inducted into the Halls of Fame of the Missouri Tigers, Missouri Sports and College Football. The Tigers retired his No. 83 jersey.

== Professional career ==
=== NFL draft and rookie season (1979) ===
"It isn't often that you get the best player in the draft without your team having the worst record."

— San Diego Chargers owner Gene Klein, after his team secured Winslow with the 13th pick in the draft.

Winslow entered the 1979 NFL draft rated as "unquestionably the best prospect at tight end" by analyst Don Heinrich. Chicago Bears general manager Jim Finks said, "Some people can play tight end with two of the three requirements. I hear Winslow has all three—size, speed and strength." Winslow was expected to be chosen early in the first round, with the Kansas City Chiefs (drafting No. 2 overall) and the Cincinnati Bengals (No. 3 overall) both likely destinations.

In the event, Winslow was unexpectedly yet to be chosen by the time the draft reached the Cleveland Browns who had selection No. 13. At that point the San Diego Chargers, who were not scheduled to pick until No. 20, made a deal with Cleveland to move up seven places and select Winslow. (Note: San Diego gave Cleveland their selections in the first and second rounds in exchange for Cleveland's first-round selection. The Browns used the picks they received on Willis Adams and Sam Claphan.) The Chargers were delighted with the trade, as they had rated Winslow as the top player in the draft, and had twice unsuccessfully tried to trade up into the top seven picks to get him. Head coach Don Coryell explained that the Chargers had an area of need at tight end, as their current starters Bob Klein and Pat Curran were both in their 30's and likely to retire soon. Winslow himself had expected to go to Cincinnati but was pleased when the Chargers selected him as he liked to catch the ball and was aware of Coryell's affinity for the passing game.

Less than three weeks after the draft, Winslow signed a series of one-year contracts to play for the Chargers. Coryell described him as "a big strong man who has great potential and ability", and suggested Winslow could play both tight end and wide receiver. When the 1979 season began, Winslow did serve in both roles, being both the second tight end behind Klein and a third wide receiver behind Charlie Joiner and John Jefferson depending on the formation. He caught his first career touchdown in week 2 of his rookie season on a 5-yard pass from quarterback Dan Fouts. When an injury to Klein forced Winslow into the starting line-up, he responded with a seven-catch performance that left him as the Chargers' leader in receptions. The following week, he lost a key fumble in a 7–0 defeat to the Denver Broncos. A Los Angeles Times article described him as inconsistent, both as a blocker and a receiver, and "like a runaway locomotive without tracks" when carrying the ball.

Winslow's season ended in a week 7 game against the Seattle Seahawks due to a fractured left fibula. While he was initially projected to be out for only six weeks, Winslow was still missing for the Chargers' season-ending playoff loss to the Houston Oilers. Winslow finished with 25 catches, which had led the team at the point when he was injured, for 255 yards and two touchdowns. Winslow later believed that the injury had positive effects, saying in a 2006 interview, "My breaking my leg my rookie year turned out to be a blessing, because I got a chance to sit back and look at some things ... from another angle and came back my second year and things really made sense."

=== Record breaker (1980–1981) ===
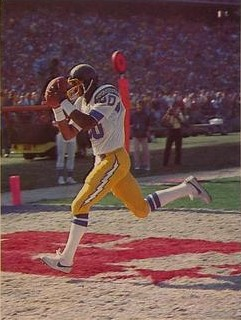
Winslow catching a touchdown pass during the 1980 season.

Winslow entered the 1980 season with a chance to claim the number one tight end position, as Klein retired during the offseason. Due to a series of minor injuries, Winslow was unable to win the place in preseason, with Greg McCrary beginning the regular season as the starter. In week 2, Winslow had a breakthrough performance against the Oakland Raiders with 9 catches for 132 yards and a touchdown in an overtime win. Coryell used Winslow in various positions and formations throughout the game, trying to force mismatches where the 6 foot 5 Winslow would be covered by a smaller defender.

As the season progressed, Winslow established himself as a key component of the Air Coryell offense and eventually led the league with 89 catches, setting a new NFL record for tight ends by breaking the previous mark of 75 held by Mike Ditka. (Note: Todd Christensen broke this record with 92 receptions in 1983.) He became the first tight end to exceed 1,000 receiving yards since Jackie Smith in 1967. Some sources credit Winslow's 1,290 yards as having set a new tight end record. (Note: This is dependent on whether Dave Parks, who had 1,344 yards in 1965, is classed as a tight end. If Winslow had the record, it stood until Rob Gronkowski totalled 1,327 yards in 2011.) He was instrumental in the Chargers' second consecutive AFC West division title, and was voted both a Pro Bowler and first-team AP All-Pro.

Winslow caught only a single pass in San Diego's first playoff game, a 20–14 divisional playoffs victory over the Buffalo Bills. This was partially due to an injury to McCrary early in the game. The Chargers frequently used a two-tight end formation, with McCrary lining up as a regular tight end and Winslow appearing in variable positions, often going in motion. They had no backup to McCrary, so Winslow was forced to replace him as a conventional tight end, with far less scope to catch passes. McCrary attempted to play through the injury the following week, but Winslow still had only 3 catches for 42 yards, and San Diego lost the AFC Championship Game 34–27 to Oakland.

The 1981 season began slowly for Winslow, with only five catches in the first two games. He drew more double coverage after Jefferson was traded to the Green Bay Packers; Winslow also theorized that teams were more aware of the threat he posed following his performances the previous year. Aided by the midseason arrival of wide receiver Wes Chandler in place of Jefferson, Winslow saw more single coverage as the season went on and produced better numbers. A highlight was a 55–21 win in Oakland when Winslow caught 13 passes for 144 yards and 5 touchdowns. The five receiving touchdowns tied an NFL single-game record that has not been surpassed as of 2026, while the 13 receptions tied Lance Alworth's franchise record. Winslow said of the performance, "I just happened to get my number called today. A lot of things were going our way and they just happened to go my way in particular."

San Diego were struggling with a 6–5 record before Winslow's five-touchdown game, but recovered to finish 10–6 and win their third consecutive AFC West title. Winslow led the league in receptions for the second consecutive season, finishing with 88 catches for 1,075 yards and 10 touchdowns. He was again named to the Pro Bowl (where he won co-MVP) and the AP All-Pro first team.

"I feel like I've been to the mountaintop, but I'm not sure if I have the strength to look over."

— Winslow, after his performance in the Epic in Miami.

Winslow excelled in the Chargers' divisional playoff game, a 41–38 overtime win over the Miami Dolphins played in draining humidity that became known as the Epic in Miami. He had 13 catches for 166 yards and a touchdown, and blocked a potential game-winning field goal at the end of regulation time. Winslow leaped in the middle of the line to block the kick, barely deflecting the ball with the outside of his right hand: he said, "For all the receptions and all the yardage, I got more satisfaction out of blocking the field goal. It was something I'd never done before. It had always been a dream of mine." His 13 receptions set a new single-game playoff record, (Note: This record was tied by Thurman Thomas in 1990 and surpassed by Darren Sproles in 2012.) while his yardage total was a playoff record for tight ends. (Note: Vernon Davis broke this record with 180 yards thirty years later.) He achieved these statistics despite repeatedly having to leave the game with dehydration and severe cramps; he was also treated for a pinched nerve in his shoulder and received three stitches in his lower lip. After the game, a picture of Winslow being helped off the field by his teammates became an enduring image in NFL lore.

Winslow's performance in the Miami game was greatly praised afterwards. Hall of Fame tight end Mike Ditka said, "Kellen Winslow portrayed in Miami what it takes to be great. The difference between great and good is a matter of heart. He gave a tremendous amount to help his team win one of the great games ever played." Dolphins' tackle Bob Kuechenberg said the game made Winslow's career in a 2017 interview, adding "I deeply resented the fact that they literally carried him off the field five times and he'd come back and do some other miracle." A 2012 ESPN article rated it the second-best single-game playoff performance in NFL history up to that point, while a 2014 San Diego Union-Tribune article named it the joint-best playoff performance by a Charger.

While Winslow scored again the following week, it was the Chargers' only touchdown in a 27–7 AFC Championship Game loss at Cincinnati. The game became known as the Freezer Bowl for the unusually frigid and windy conditions. Winslow commented afterwards, "I wouldn't send my dog out in that kind of weather."

=== Continued success (1982–1983) ===
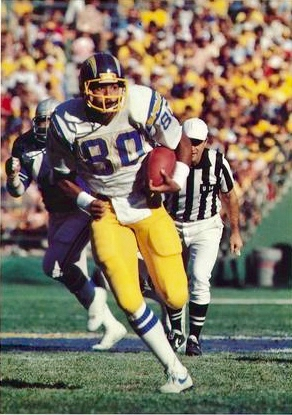
Winslow c. 1982

The 1982 season was interrupted by a 57-day NFL players strike which reduced the regular season to nine games. Winslow expressed impatience with the process, claiming that players' union director Ed Garvey and management negotiator Jack Donlan were both on "ego trips". While Garvey was seeking a wage scale for the players, Winslow believed that abolishing the NFL draft and encouraging the development of the rival United States Football League (USFL) would do more to increase their salaries. On the field, his success continued—Winslow's 54 receptions were the most in the AFC, while his 721 yards were second to his teammate Chandler. For the third consecutive season, he was named both a Pro Bowler and AP first-team All-Pro.

San Diego qualified for the playoffs for the fourth consecutive season, taking their place in an expanded 16-team Super Bowl tournament as the AFC's fifth seed and travelling to the Pittsburgh Steelers for their first game. The Steelers led 28–17 in the final quarter, but two touchdowns by Winslow gave San Diego a 31–28 win; he had 7 catches for 102 yards and the two scores. A rematch with the Dolphins in Miami followed. Winslow was unable to repeat his performance of the previous year, playing with a twisted ankle for most of the game and finishing with only one catch for 18 yards as Miami won 34–13. Winslow said of the defeat, "You can say it either way: They had a great day, or we had an off day. But really it was both." It was the last playoff game of his career.

An National Football League Players Association (NFLPA) survey released after the season reported his annual salary as $210,000, joint third-most on the Chargers but behind 64 players league-wide, including some tight ends.

The Chargers had a disappointing 1983 season and missed the playoffs for the first time in Winslow's career, although he himself had another statistically productive year. Winslow had 14 catches for 162 yards and 3 touchdowns in a win over the Chiefs, breaking the franchise single-game receptions record he'd previously shared with Alworth. He finished the year with 88 catches for 1,172 yards and 8 touchdowns, and was voted to another Pro Bowl, though this time as the AFC's reserve tight end behind Todd Christensen of Los Angeles. Winslow had caught more passes than any other player over the five-year period 1979–83.

=== Holdout and career-threatening injury (1984) ===
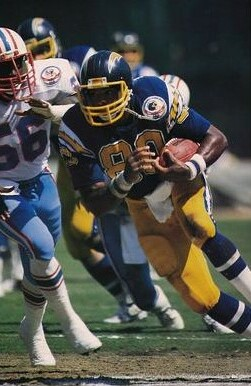
1984: Two weeks after announcing his retirement, Winslow returned to action against the Houston Oilers.

Winslow entered the 1984 season seeking to renegotiate his contract. He had two years remaining on a five-year contract and a verbal agreement from Chargers ownership that he could negotiate a new deal in 1984. He requested an amount which the Chargers refused, with Winslow's agent Jim Steiner stating shortly before the regular season started that the two sides were far apart with their offers. (Note: There were no official statements as to the sums involved, but Chargers were reported as offering a five-year deal worth $480,000 in the first year, followed by increases of $50,000 per year, while Winslow was reported to be requesting $700,000 per year.) Steiner declared Winslow's intention to play in week 1 at Minnesota, "out of respect for the team, Don Coryell and the coaching staff", then retire if no agreement was forthcoming. On September 2 he followed through on the threat, catching four passes in the game then travelling to East St. Louis instead of flying back to San Diego with his teammates. He criticized ownership for letting players such as Jefferson and Fred Dean leave in the past due to similar contract disputes, saying "I feel cheated ... they've turned their back on me. I have nowhere else to go but home." Chargers general manager Johnny Sanders said that there would be no further negotiations with Winslow while he refused to report to camp. San Diego declined to place Winslow on the retirement list, which would have prevented him playing for the rest of the year. On September 5, Steiner suggested that Winslow could still be induced to return, but that they were investigating other means of income, including television work. The Chargers signed veteran tight end Al Dixon as a replacement on September 6. The Houston Gamblers of the USFL declared an interest in signing Winslow, staging a press conference with the player on September 8. Winslow stated at the conference that he would return to San Diego and play the remaining two years there; he was not permitted to sign for the Gamblers until his Chargers contract expired, but expressed an interest in joining them for the 1986 season. (Note: Published reports had Houston offering $600,000 per year for five years.) Winslow then returned to the Chargers, allowing negotiations to re-open. On September 12, Winslow agreed to a new five-year contract with San Diego. (Note: Terms of the new contract were not initially disclosed, but subsequent surveys placed Winslow's salary at $535,000 in its second year, with the three subsequent years paying $585,000, $745,000 and $795,000 respectively.)

Winslow had missed one game due to his holdout, but returned in week 3 to face the Oilers at home. The Jack Murphy Stadium crowd booed him when he was announced at the start of the game, a 31–14 victory in which he had 10 catches for 146 yards. Three weeks later, he broke the Chargers single-game receptions record for the second time with 15 catches for 157 yards in a 34–28 win at Green Bay. (Note: Keenan Allen tied this record in 2015 and broke it in 2020.) Despite having missed a game, he was on course to break Charley Hennigan's league record of 101 catches in a season before being stopped by a serious knee injury.

"Jeff Barnes was on the inside, came and hit me low and that's when the doctors say the posterior cruciate went. When I got hit in the front, my knee snapped back and then Rod Martin tackled me over the front, and I got twisted, and that's when probably the medial collateral ligament went during that time. Nothing dirty about it."

— Winslow, describing the knee injury that ended his 1984 season.

In week 8, late in a 44–37 loss to the Raiders, Winslow took a short pass over the middle for his 55th reception of the season. His knee twisted while being tackled by Los Angeles linebackers Jeff Barnes and Rod Martin. In the immediate wake of the injury, Winslow described himself as "flopping on the field like a flounder out of water." Once medical staff reset his knee, Winslow smiled and exchanged jokes with the Raiders as he left the field, but learned in the treatment room that his injury would require season-ending surgery after the game. Team physician Gary Losse, who performed the surgery over the course of two hours, later said that Winslow's knee looked like "spaghetti ... like a couple of mop ends." Losse also said, "The ligaments had almost an explosion-like appearance, it was a very, very severe knee injury." The severity was due in part to both the medial collateral ligament (MCL) and anterior cruciate ligament (ACL) being damaged. Reflecting on his season the following week, Winslow was relieved that he had insisted on a guaranteed contract during negotiations, which ensured he would be paid in full for five years even if he was unable to play again.

=== Post-injury (1985–1987) ===
Interviewed during April 1985, Winslow reported that his recovery was proceeding ahead of schedule. He was optimistic of a midseason return in the coming season, and of again being the best tight end in the league. In August, he was placed on the physically unable to perform list. Winslow returned to action in week 7 of the 1985 season, two days short of a year after the injury happened. In a loss at the Minnesota Vikings, he caught two passes, produced key blocks on a pair of touchdown runs, and described the game as "like old times." Two weeks later, he was used on only four plays in a win over Denver, all of which were running plays. He was visibly upset over his lack of usage, and failed to report for practice the next day, instead flying to Canada to promote a drink in which he had a financial stake. The following day, he returned to the team and apologised for his absence.

Winslow was used primarily as a blocker or decoy throughout the season, and finished with only 25 catches for 318 yards and no touchdowns from his ten appearances. Compared with his play before the injury, Winslow struggled to break tackles and change directions sharply when running pass routes. He said, "I'll never be the Kellen Winslow of old. There will always be something missing because of the reconstruction."

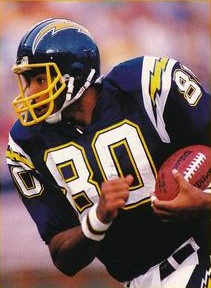
Winslow c. 1986

Winslow improved in the 1986 season, catching 64 passes for 728 yards and 5 touchdowns, with 45 of his catches coming in the final nine games. Offensive coordinator Ernie Zampese described his movement as more fluid and his play as more confident. Winslow would later describe his own play as still being tentative and scared during the 1986 season.

During the following offseason Winslow underwent arthroscopic surgery on his knee to clear out scar tissue from his injury; he reported improved running ability afterwards. The 1987 season was shortened by a players strike, which saw one week cancelled and three more played primarily with replacement players. Winslow sat out the entire strike, which he described as frustrating. He taped over his jersey number during a training session in protest at his No. 80 being used by one of the replacement players.

On the field, Winslow was pleased to find that he was that he was better at breaking tackles than the previous year. His play after the strike prompted his new head coach Al Saunders to say that he was once again playing at a league-leading standard. Winslow made his 500th career reception during the season, following Ozzie Newsome as the second tight end to pass the landmark. He finished with 53 catches from his twelve games, second-most among NFL tights ends, though his 9.8 yards per reception was the least of his career. His performances earned him his fifth Pro Bowl nomination (his first since the knee injury) and a place in the AP All-Pro second team, while his teammates named him their offensive player of the year. He said that during the year he had accomplished "the regaining of respect, both on this team and around the league ... a resurgence to the level a lot of people wondered I could still play at."

=== Suspension and retirement (1988) ===
Winslow expected to continue his career in the 1988 season, though he hinted it might be his last season, reporting that the Chargers did not seem eager to extend his contract. Entering the season at 30 years old, he was the second-longest tenured Charger, behind only center Don Macek. He again had arthroscopic surgery during the offseason, and failed one physical before passing a second one and joining his teammates at training camp in August. He was unable to play in the Chargers' first two preseason games and featured briefly in the third. Subsequently, he had to leave training early on consecutive days, missed a third day entirely, and was ruled out of the final preseason game due to his knee. Saunders said, "It's just not coming around. It's concerning him and I know it's concerning us."

On August 29, Winslow announced to journalists that he had been suspended without pay by the Chargers following a meeting with team officials. Describing his physical state during his preseason appearance as "total ineptness", Winslow said he had informed Saunders and director of football operations Steve Ortmayer that he was unable to continue his career. The Chargers maintained that he was fit to play having passed a physical, and had been suspended for refusing to do so. This caused a dispute as to whether Winslow should be paid his guaranteed salary of $795,000 for the coming season. He would forfeit the money if he officially retired; the Chargers offered him half the amount to retire, which Winslow refused. Gene Upshaw, executive director of the NFLPA, supported Winslow—he said that the Chargers had suspended their player while citing an outdated collective bargaining agreement, and that the NFLPA intended to file a lawsuit against the team. Winslow also threatened litigation, but instead decided to wait while Steiner negotiated with Ortmayer to find a compromise retirement settlement.

"Everything has been resolved, but I'm disappointed in the Chargers. I gave them the last nine years of my life and I wasn't treated very fairly at the end. I was glad to get out of there and get on with my life."

— Winslow, speaking after his retirement.

On September 30, the two sides reached agreement and Winslow's retirement became official. The terms of the agreement were not revealed. Winslow was critical of the Chargers' handling of the situation, saying that they had stripped him of his dignity by imposing the suspension. Ortmayer responded that there no should be no negative connotations to being placed on the suspended players list, as the NFL required all players on the roster to be given one of the available designations.

Interviewed the following year, Winslow described his career as "like a fairy tale", saying that he had been fortunate with his choice of high school and college, and with having a head coach in Coryell who could best exploit his abilities.

=== Legacy ===
Through his nine years in the NFL, Winslow caught 541 passes for 6,741 yards and 45 touchdowns in the regular season. His receptions total ranked 14th in league history at the time of his retirement. Winslow played in five Pro Bowls, and was named to three AP All-Pro first teams and one second team. Further honors followed his retirement, as he was voted into the NFL's All-1980s team, 75th anniversary team, and 100th anniversary team. In 1995, Winslow was inducted into both the Pro Football Hall of Fame and the Chargers Hall of Fame; the Chargers retired his No. 80 jersey in 2023.

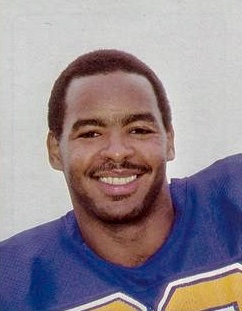
Winslow c. 1982

Winslow is widely recognized as one of the best to play his position, and credited with revolutionizing the usage of tight ends in the NFL. Tight ends prior to Winslow were primarily blockers who lined up next to an offensive lineman and ran short to medium routes; Winslow said upon being drafted, "I can get just as deep as wide receivers and just as fast", and Coryell quickly identified him as someone who could line up as a wide receiver on some plays and a tight end on others. As his career progressed, the Chargers would use Winslow unpredictably in a number of positions over the course of a game, including flanker, split end, slotback, H-back, wingback or conventional tight end. He might start the play in a three point blocking stance or a two point receiver's stance, or be put in motion so he would not be jammed at the line.

Winslow was credited with creating the H-back position by Joe Bugel, an offensive coordinator with the Washington teams who made use of H-backs to win multiple Super Bowls. He said, "It takes the complete athlete, a guy who can block an end or a linebacker or take a cornerback or strong safety deep." Saunders described Winslow as "a wide receiver in an offensive lineman's body", while Coryell said, "If we're asking Kellen to block a defensive end and not catch passes, I'm not a very good coach." Former head coach Jon Gruden called Winslow the first "joker" in the NFL. Head coach Bill Belichick noted that the pass-catching tight ends who get paid the most money are "all direct descendants of Kellen Winslow" and that there were fewer tight ends in the 21st century who could block on the line. Winslow himself credited Coryell and his coaching staff for thinking outside the box to utilize his abilities in new ways: "There were many athletes before me who could do the things that I did. You talk about Charlie Sanders ... Could stand in there and hold his own. Could run good routes. Probably could split him out. But I came into a situation with the offensive system where I could do those things."

He called the coin toss at the pregame ceremony at Super Bowl XXIX between the Chargers and the San Francisco 49ers, which was done by then-Congressman Steve Largent on behalf of the surviving members of the Pro Football Hall of Fame Class of 1995 (the other survivor was Lee Roy Selmon) and 75th Anniversary Team members Otto Graham, Gale Sayers, Mean Joe Greene and Ray Nitschke (representing PBHOF Class of 1995 member Henry Jordan).

Lists of the top 100 NFL players at any position frequently feature Winslow: In 1999, he was ranked No. 73 by The Sporting News, a 2010 NFL Network series had him at No. 67, and a panel of USA Today journalists placed him at No. 79 in 2019.

== Career statistics ==
Legend
| **Bold** | Career high |

=== NFL ===
| Season | Team | GP | GS | Rec | Yds | Y/R | TD |
|---|---|---|---|---|---|---|---|
| 1979 | San Diego | 7 | 1 | 25 | 255 | 10.2 | 2 |
| 1980 | San Diego | 16 | 11 | **89** | **1,290** | **14.5** | 9 |
| 1981 | San Diego | 16 | 16 | 88 | 1,075 | 12.2 | **10** |
| 1982 | San Diego | 9 | 9 | 54 | 721 | 13.4 | 6 |
| 1983 | San Diego | 16 | 16 | 88 | 1,172 | 13.3 | 8 |
| 1984 | San Diego | 7 | 7 | 55 | 663 | 12.1 | 2 |
| 1985 | San Diego | 10 | 6 | 25 | 318 | 12.7 | 0 |
| 1986 | San Diego | 16 | 16 | 64 | 728 | 11.4 | 5 |
| 1987 | San Diego | 12 | 12 | 53 | 519 | 9.8 | 3 |
| Career | | 109 | 94 | 541 | 6,741 | 12.5 | 45 |

=== College ===
| Season | Team | GP | Rec | Yds | Y/R | TD |
|---|---|---|---|---|---|---|
| 1975 | Missouri | 11 | 1 | 12 | 12.0 | 0 |
| 1976 | Missouri | 11 | 16 | 240 | 15.0 | 1 |
| 1977 | Missouri | 11 | 25 | 358 | 14.3 | 3 |
| 1978 | Missouri | 11 | **29** | **479** | **16.5** | **6** |
| Career | | 44 | 71 | 1089 | 15.3 | 10 |

== Career highlights ==
=== Awards and honors ===
NFL

- 3× First-team Associated Press All-Pro (1980, 1981, 1982)
- Second-team Associated Press All-Pro (1987)
- 5× Pro Bowl (1980, 1981, 1982, 1983, 1987)
- Pro Bowl MVP (1981)
- 2x NFL receptions leader (1980, 1981)
- San Diego Chargers 50th Anniversary Team
- Los Angeles Chargers Hall of Fame inductee (1995) (Note: The Chargers relocated to Los Angeles in 2017.)
- Los Angeles Chargers No. 80 retired (2023)
- NFL team of the quarter-century, 1960–84
- NFL 1980s All-Decade Team
- NFL 75th anniversary team
- NFL 100th anniversary team
- No. 67 on The Top 100: NFL's Greatest Players
- Pro Football Hall of Fame inductee (1995)

College

- First-team All-Big Eight (1977)
- Second team All-Big Eight (1978)
- Consensus first-team All-American (1978)
- Missouri Tigers Hall of Fame inductee (1990)
- Missouri Sports Hall of Fame inductee (1994)
- Missouri Tigers No. 83 retired (1995)
- College Football Hall of Fame inductee (2002)

=== Records ===
==== NFL records ====
The 2024 NFL Record & Fact Book credits Winslow with one league record.

- Most touchdown receptions, game: 5 (week 12, 1981; tied with Bob Shaw and Jerry Rice)

==== Los Angeles Chargers records ====
The Los Angeles Chargers 2025 Media Guide credits Winslow with six franchise records.

- Most points, game: 30 (week 12, 1981)
- Most touchdowns, game: 5 (week 12, 1981)
- Most touchdown receptions, game: 5 (week 12, 1981)
- Most playoff touchdowns, career: 4 (tied with three others)
- Most playoff receptions, game: 13 (divisional playoffs, 1981)
- Most playoff receiving touchdowns, career: 4 (tied with Charlie Joiner)

== Personal life ==
In the immediate wake of his retirement, Winslow served as marketing vice president and major stockholder for a San Diego-based nutrition company. He earned a Juris Doctor degree from the University of San Diego in 1993 and spent some time as a sports agent, while doubling as a radio commentator for his alma mater the Missouri Tigers. Later, he worked as a college football announcer with Fox Sports Net. Winslow served in various sports administrator roles, having been athletic director at Central State University, vice president for athletics and wellness at Lakeland College, and director of athletics at Florida A&M University.

Winslow has been married twice. He has two sons, Kellen II with his first wife and Justin Winslow with his then-girlfriend. Kellen II also played tight end in the NFL.

Winslow has been a vocal proponent of affirmative action, particularly in football—he dedicated a substantial section of his Hall of Fame induction speech to highlighting the lack of African Americans in non-playing roles. When his son announced his intention to sign with the University of Washington, Winslow objected as the coaching staff featured no African Americans; Winslow II eventually signed with the University of Miami instead. Winslow described this as "a black father teaching his black son about the ways of the world."

== Bibliography ==
- Jaworski, Ron; Plaut, David; Cosell, Greg (2011). The Games That Changed the Game: The Evolution of the NFL in Seven Sundays. Random House. ISBN 978-0-34551-796-8.
- Tobias, Todd (2006). Bombs away! Air Coryell and the San Diego Chargers. Bandana Publishing. ISBN 0-9785729-0-4.
- Soehn, Joe (2017). The Epic in Miami: The story of the great '81 San Diego-Miami playoff game (E-book ed.). ISBN 978-0-615-99757-5.
