= 1982 Pro Bowl =

National Football League all-star game

1982 NFL Pro Bowl
NFC	AFC
13	16
Head coach: John McKay (Tampa Bay Buccaneers)	Head coach: Don Shula (Miami Dolphins)
	1	2	3	4	Total
NFC	0	6	0	7	13
AFC	0	0	13	3	16
- Date: January 31, 1982
- Stadium: Aloha Stadium; Honolulu, Hawaii
- Co-MVPs: Kellen Winslow (San Diego Chargers), Lee Roy Selmon (Tampa Bay Buccaneers)
- Referee: Red Cashion
- Attendance: 49,521

TV in the United States
- Network: ABC
- Announcers: Al Michaels, Fran Tarkenton, Lynn Swann & Russ Francis

The 1982 Pro Bowl was the NFL's 32nd annual all-star game which featured the outstanding performers from the 1981 season. The game was played on Sunday, January 31, 1982, at Aloha Stadium in Honolulu, Hawaii, in front of a crowd of 49,521. The final score was AFC 16, NFC 13.

Don Shula of the Miami Dolphins led the AFC team against an NFC team coached by Tampa Bay Buccaneers head coach John McKay. The referee was Red Cashion.

The NFC gained a 13–13 tie with 2:43 to go when Tony Dorsett ran four yards for a touchdown. In the drive to the game-winning field goal, Dan Fouts completed 3 passes, including a 23-yarder to Kellen Winslow that put the ball on the NFC's 5-yard line to set up a 23-yard game winning field goal by Nick Lowery to earn AFC a victory.

Kellen Winslow of the San Diego Chargers and Lee Roy Selmon of the Tampa Bay Buccaneers were named the game's Most Valuable Players. The referee was Red Cashion.

Players on the winning AFC team received $5,000 apiece while the NFC participants each took home $2,500. The total number of tickets sold for the game was 50,402 which set a new ticket sales record for Aloha Stadium.

During the game, Russ Francis interviewed 49ers head coach Bill Walsh during the interview, Walsh convinced Francis to come out of retirement and continue to play football. Francis agreed and Walsh traded for him from the New England Patriots (who still held his rights) in exchange for the Patriots receiving the 49ers first round pick, two second round picks, and a fourth round pick in the 1982 draft.

== AFC roster ==
=== Offense ===
Position	Starter(s)	Reserve(s)
Quarterback	14 Ken Anderson, Cincinnati	14 Dan Fouts, San Diego
Running back	37 Joe Delaney, Kansas City	34 Earl Campbell, Houston; 20 Joe Cribbs, Buffalo; 46 Chuck Muncie, San Diego
Fullback	46 Pete Johnson, Cincinnati	
Wide receiver	80 Cris Collinsworth, Cincinnati; 82 Frank Lewis, Buffalo	80 Steve Largent, Seattle; 81 Steve Watson, Denver
Tight end	89 Kellen Winslow, San Diego	82 Ozzie Newsome, Cleveland
Offensive tackle	78 Anthony Muñoz, Cincinnati; 79 Marvin Powell, New York Jets	74 Leon Gray, Houston
Offensive guard	73 John Hannah, New England; 63 Doug Wilkerson, San Diego	64 Ed Newman, Miami
Center	52 Mike Webster, Pittsburgh	65 Joe Fields, N.Y. Jets

=== Defense ===
Position	Starter(s)	Reserve(s)
Defensive end	99 Mark Gastineau, N.Y. Jets; 73 Joe Klecko, N.Y. Jets	67 Art Still, Kansas City
Defensive tackle	79 Gary Johnson, San Diego; 73 Bob Baumhower, Miami	76 Fred Smerlas, Buffalo
Outside linebacker	52 Robert Brazile, Houston; 83 Ted Hendricks, Oakland	51 Bob Swenson, Denver Broncos
Inside linebacker	58 Jack Lambert, Pittsburgh	53 Randy Gradishar, Denver
Cornerback	47 Mel Blount, Pittsburgh; 37 Lester Hayes, Oakland	24 Gary Green, Kansas City
Free safety	26 Gary Barbaro, Kansas City	
Strong safety	31 Donnie Shell, Pittsburgh	36 Bill Thompson, Denver

=== Special teams ===
Position	Starter(s)	Reserve(s)
Punter	87 Pat McInally, Cincinnati	
Placekicker	8 Nick Lowery, Kansas City	
Kick returner	85 Carl Roaches, Houston	

== NFC roster ==
=== Offense ===
Position	Starter(s)	Reserve(s)
Quarterback	16 Joe Montana, San Francisco	10 Steve Bartkowski, Atlanta
Running back	33 Tony Dorsett, Dallas; 38 George Rogers, New Orleans	20 Billy Sims, Detroit
Fullback	31 William Andrews, Atlanta	
Wide receiver	84 Alfred Jenkins, Atlanta; 80 James Lofton, Green Bay	87 Dwight Clark, San Francisco; 28 Ahmad Rashad, Minnesota
Tight end	88 Jimmie Giles, Tampa Bay	80 Junior Miller, Atlanta
Offensive tackle	67 Pat Donovan, Dallas; 78 Mike Kenn, Atlanta	76 Jerry Sisemore, Philadelphia
Offensive guard	51 Randy Cross, San Francisco; 68 Herbert Scott, Dallas	68 R. C. Thielemann, Atlanta
Center	61 Rich Saul, Los Angeles	57 Jeff Van Note, Atlanta

=== Defense ===
Position	Starter(s)	Reserve(s)
Defensive end	72 Ed Jones, Dallas; 63 Lee Roy Selmon, Tampa Bay	74 Fred Dean, San Francisco
Defensive tackle	65 Charlie Johnson, Philadelphia; 54 Randy White, Dallas	78 Doug English, Detroit
Outside linebacker	56 Lawrence Taylor, N.Y. Giants; 59 Matt Blair, Minnesota	56 Jerry Robinson, Philadelphia
Inside linebacker	53 Harry Carson, N.Y. Giants	55 Frank LeMaster, Philadelphia
Cornerback	24 Everson Walls, Dallas; 42 Ronnie Lott, San Francisco	43 Roynell Young, Philadelphia
Free safety	21 Nolan Cromwell, Los Angeles	22 Dwight Hicks, San Francisco
Strong safety	45 Gary Fencik, Chicago	

=== Special teams ===
Position	Starter(s)	Reserve(s)
Punter	1 Tom Skladany, Detroit	
Placekicker	1 Rafael Septién, Dallas	
Kick returner	21 Mike Nelms, Washington	
