= 1981 All-Pro Team =

Official list of the best NFL players in 1981

The 1981 All-Pro Team is composed of the National Football League players that were named to the Associated Press, Newspaper Enterprise Association, Pro Football Writers Association, Pro Football Weekly, and The Sporting News All-Pro Teams in 1981. Both first- and second- teams are listed for the AP and NEA teams. These are the five teams that are included in Total Football II: The Official Encyclopedia of the National Football League. The Associated Press added a "nose tackle" position in 1981, joining Pro Football Weekly .

== Teams ==
Offense
Position	First team	Second team
Quarterback	Ken Anderson, Cincinnati Bengals (AP, NEA, PFWA, PFW, TSN)	Joe Montana, San Francisco 49ers (AP-2, NEA-2)
Running back	George Rogers, New Orleans Saints (AP, TSN); Billy Sims, Detroit Lions (NEA, PFWA, PFW); Tony Dorsett, Dallas Cowboys (AP, NEA, PFWA, PFW, TSN)	William Andrews, Atlanta Falcons (AP-2); Joe Cribbs, Buffalo Bills (NEA-2); Billy Sims, Detroit Lions (AP-2); George Rogers, New Orleans Saints (NEA-2)
Wide receiver	Alfred Jenkins, Atlanta Falcons (AP, NEA, PFWA, PFW-t, TSN); James Lofton, Green Bay Packers (AP, NEA, PFWA, PFW, TSN); Steve Watson, Denver Broncos (PFW-t)	Cris Collinsworth, Cincinnati Bengals (AP-2); Frank Lewis, Buffalo Bills (NEA-2); Steve Watson, Denver Broncos (AP-2, NEA-2)
Tight end	Kellen Winslow, San Diego Chargers (AP, NEA, PFWA, PFW, TSN)	Ozzie Newsome, Cleveland Browns (AP-2); Joe Senser, Minnesota Vikings (NEA-2)
Tackle	Anthony Muñoz, Cincinnati Bengals (AP, NEA, PFWA, PFW, TSN); Marvin Powell, New York Jets (AP, NEA, PFWA, PFW, TSN)	Mike Kenn, Atlanta Falcons (AP-2, NEA-2); Pat Donovan, Dallas Cowboys (AP-2, NEA-2)
Guard	John Hannah, New England Patriots (AP, NEA, PFWA, PFW, TSN); Randy Cross, San Francisco 49ers (NEA, PFWA, PFW); Herbert Scott, Dallas Cowboys (AP, TSN)	Ed Newman, Miami Dolphins (AP-2, NEA-2); Randy Cross, San Francisco 49ers (AP-2); Herbert Scott, Dallas Cowboys (NEA-2)
Center	Mike Webster, Pittsburgh Steelers (AP, NEA, PFWA, PFW, TSN)	Rich Saul, Los Angeles Rams (NEA-2); Joe Fields, New York Jets (AP-2)

Special teams
Position	First team	Second team
Kicker	Rafael Septién, Dallas Cowboys (AP, PFWA, PFW, TSN); Nick Lowery, Kansas City Chiefs (NEA)	Eddie Murray, Detroit Lions (NEA-2); Nick Lowery, Kansas City Chiefs (AP-2)
Punter	Pat McInally, Cincinnati Bengals (AP, PFWA, TSN); Tom Skladany, Detroit Lions (NEA, PFW)	Dave Jennings, New York Giants (AP-2); Pat McInally, Cincinnati Bengals (NEA-2)
Kick returner	LeRoy Irvin, Los Angeles Rams (AP); Mike Nelms, Washington Redskins (PFWA, PFW, TSN)	Mike Nelms, Washington Redskins (AP-2)
Punt returner	LeRoy Irvin, Los Angeles Rams (PFWA, PFW, TSN)	

Defense
Position	First team	Second team
Defensive end	Fred Dean, San Diego Chargers/San Francisco 49ers (AP, PFWA, PFW, TSN); Joe Klecko, New York Jets (AP, NEA, PFWA, PFW, TSN); Ed Jones, Dallas Cowboys (NEA)	Ed Jones, Dallas Cowboys (AP-2); Fred Dean, San Diego Chargers/San Francisco 49ers (NEA-2); Mark Gastineau, New York Jets (AP-2, NEA-2)
Defensive tackle	Randy White, Dallas Cowboys (AP, NEA, PFWA, PFW, TSN); Gary Johnson, San Diego Chargers (AP, PFWA, TSN); Doug English, Detroit Lions (NEA, PFW); Fred Smerlas, Buffalo Bills (PFW-NT); Bob Baumhower, Miami Dolphins (TSN); Charlie Johnson, Philadelphia Eagles (AP-NT)	Louie Kelcher, San Diego Chargers (AP-2); Doug English, Detroit Lions (AP-2); Fred Smerlas, Buffalo Bills (NEA-2); Bob Baumhower, Miami Dolphins (AP-2-NT, NEA-2)
Middle linebacker	Jack Lambert, Pittsburgh Steelers (AP, NEA, PFWA, PFW, TSN); Randy Gradishar, Denver Broncos (PFW, TSN); Harry Carson, New York Giants (PFW)	Randy Gradishar, Denver Broncos (AP-2, NEA-2)
Outside linebacker	Bob Swenson, Denver Broncos (AP, NEA, TSN); Lawrence Taylor, New York Giants (AP, NEA, PFWA, PFW, TSN); Jerry Robinson, Philadelphia Eagles (PFWA)	Matt Blair, Minnesota Vikings (NEA-2); Rod Martin, Oakland Raiders (NEA-2); Jerry Robinson, Philadelphia Eagles (AP-2); Robert Brazile, Houston Oilers (AP-2)
Cornerback	Ronnie Lott, San Francisco 49ers (AP, NEA, PFWA, PFW, TSN); Mel Blount, Pittsburgh Steelers (AP, PFWA); Mark Haynes, New York Giants (NEA, PFW); Lester Hayes, Oakland Raiders (TSN)	Mark Haynes, New York Giants (AP-2); Gary Green, Kansas City Chiefs (NEA-2); Roynell Young, Philadelphia Eagles (AP-2, NEA-2)
Safety	Nolan Cromwell, Los Angeles Rams (AP, NEA, PFWA, PFW, TSN); Gary Fencik, Chicago Bears (AP, TSN); Gary Barbaro, Kansas City Chiefs (NEA, PFWA); Dwight Hicks, San Francisco 49ers (PFW)	Dwight Hicks, San Francisco 49ers (AP-2, NEA-2); Donnie Shell, Pittsburgh Steelers (AP-2); Gary Fencik, Chicago Bears (NEA-2)

== Key ==
- AP = Associated Press first-team All-Pro
- AP-2 = Associated Press second-team All-Pro
- NEA = Newspaper Enterprise Association first-team All-Pro team
- NEA-2 = Newspaper Enterprise Association second-team All-Pro team
- PFW = Pro Football Weekly All-Pro team
- PFWA = Pro Football Writers Association All-NFL
- TSN = The Sporting News All-Pro
