= 1981 Pro Bowl =

National Football League all-star game

1981 NFL Pro Bowl
AFC	NFC
7	21
Head coach: Sam Rutigliano (Cleveland Browns)	Head coach: Leeman Bennett (Atlanta Falcons)
	1	2	3	4	Total
AFC	0	7	0	0	7
NFC	3	6	0	12	21
- Date: February 1, 1981
- Stadium: Aloha Stadium; Honolulu, Hawaii
- MVP: Eddie Murray (Detroit Lions)
- Referee: Gordon McCarter
- Attendance: 50,360

TV in the United States
- Network: ABC
- Announcers: Frank Gifford, Howard Cosell, Fran Tarkenton & Lynn Swann

The 1981 Pro Bowl was the NFL's 31st annual all-star game which featured the outstanding performers from the 1980 season. The game was played on Sunday, February 1, 1981, at Aloha Stadium in Honolulu, Hawaii. The final score was NFC 21, AFC 7.

Sam Rutigliano of the Cleveland Browns led the AFC team against an NFC team coached by Atlanta Falcons head coach Leeman Bennett. The referee was Gordon McCarter.

Rookie placekicker Eddie Murray of the Detroit Lions was named the game's Most Valuable Player.

Players on the winning NFC team received $5,000 apiece while the AFC participants each took home $2,500. The game was the first in NFL history played in February.

== AFC roster ==
=== Offense ===
Position	Starter(s)	Reserve(s)
Quarterback	17 Brian Sipe, Cleveland	14 Dan Fouts, San Diego
Running back	34 Earl Campbell, Houston	20 Joe Cribbs, Buffalo; 33 Kenny King, Oakland
Fullback	43 Mike Pruitt, Cleveland	32 Franco Harris, Pittsburgh
Wide receiver	83 John Jefferson, San Diego; 18 Charlie Joiner, San Diego	80 Jerry Butler, Buffalo; 86 Stanley Morgan, New England
Tight end	89 Kellen Winslow, San Diego	87 Dave Casper, Houston
Offensive tackle	73 Doug Dieken, Cleveland; 79 Marvin Powell, N.Y. Jets	78 Art Shell, Oakland
Offensive guard	73 John Hannah, New England; 64 Joe DeLamielleure, Cleveland	63 Doug Wilkerson, San Diego
Center	52 Mike Webster, Pittsburgh	54 Tom DeLeone, Cleveland

=== Defense ===
Position	Starter(s)	Reserve(s)
Defensive end	71 Fred Dean, San Diego; 67 Art Still, Kansas City	85 Julius Adams, New England
Defensive tackle	79 Gary Johnson, San Diego; 74 Louie Kelcher, San Diego	76 Fred Smerlas, Buffalo
Outside linebacker	52 Robert Brazile, Houston; 83 Ted Hendricks, Oakland	59 Jack Ham, Pittsburgh
Inside linebacker	58 Jack Lambert, Pittsburgh	57 Steve Nelson, New England
Cornerback	37 Lester Hayes, Oakland; 40 Mike Haynes, New England	27 Greg Stemrick, Houston
Free safety	26 Gary Barbaro, Kansas City	48 Tim Fox, New England
Strong safety	31 Donnie Shell, Pittsburgh	

=== Special teams ===
Position	Starter(s)	Reserve(s)
Punter	8 Ray Guy, Oakland	
Placekicker	1 John Smith, New England	
Kick returner	86 J.T. Smith, Kansas City	

== NFC roster ==
=== Offense ===
Position	Starter(s)	Reserve(s)
Quarterback	10 Steve Bartkowski, Atlanta	7 Ron Jaworski, Philadelphia
Running back	34 Walter Payton, Chicago	32 Ottis Anderson, St. Louis; 20 Billy Sims, Detroit
Fullback	31 William Andrews, Atlanta	
Wide receiver	17 Harold Carmichael, Philadelphia; 80 James Lofton, Green Bay	84 Alfred Jenkins, Atlanta; 28 Ahmad Rashad, Minnesota; 83 Pat Tilley, St. Louis
Tight end	88 Jimmie Giles, Tampa Bay	80 Junior Miller, Atlanta
Offensive tackle	72 Dan Dierdorf, St. Louis; 78 Mike Kenn, Atlanta	67 Pat Donovan, Dallas
Offensive guard	72 Kent Hill, L.A. Rams; 68 Herbert Scott, Dallas	60 Dennis Harrah, L.A. Rams
Center	61 Rich Saul, Los Angeles	57 Jeff Van Note, Atlanta

=== Defense ===
Position	Starter(s)	Reserve(s)
Defensive end	60 Al Baker, Detroit; 63 Lee Roy Selmon, Tampa Bay	99 Dan Hampton, Chicago
Defensive tackle	65 Charlie Johnson, Philadelphia; 54 Randy White, Dallas	90 Larry Brooks, L.A. Rams
Outside linebacker	59 Matt Blair, Minnesota; 10 Brad Van Pelt, N.Y. Giants	56 Dave Lewis, Tampa Bay
Inside linebacker	53 Bob Breunig, Dallas	64 Jack Reynolds, L.A. Rams
Cornerback	49 Rod Perry, L.A. Rams; 27 Pat Thomas, L.A. Rams	24 Lemar Parrish, Washington
Free safety	21 Nolan Cromwell, Los Angeles	
Strong safety	45 Gary Fencik, Chicago	

=== Special teams ===
Position	Starter(s)	Reserve(s)
Punter	13 Dave Jennings, N.Y. Giants	
Placekicker	3 Eddie Murray, Detroit	
Kick returner	21 Mike Nelms, Washington	
