= Wallace Francis =

American football player (born 1951)

No. 89
- Position: Wide receiver

Personal information
- Born: November 7, 1951 (age 74); Franklin, Louisiana, U.S.
- Listed height: 5 ft 11 in (1.80 m)
- Listed weight: 190 lb (86 kg)

Career information
- High school: Park Avenue (Franklin)
- College: Arkansas-Pine Bluff
- NFL draft: 1973: 5th round, 110th overall pick

Career history
- Buffalo Bills (1973–1974); Atlanta Falcons (1975–1981)

Career NFL statistics
- Receptions: 244
- Receiving yards: 3,695
- Receiving TDs: 27
- Stats at Pro Football Reference

Wallace Diron Francis (born November 7, 1951) is an American former professional football player who was a wide receiver for nine seasons in the National Football League (NFL) for the Buffalo Bills and the Atlanta Falcons from 1973 to 1981.

Francis played college football for the Arkansas–Pine Bluff Golden Lions.

== NFL career statistics ==
Legend
**Bold**	Career high

=== Regular season ===
Year	Team	Games		Receiving				
Year	Team	GP	GS	Rec	Yds	Avg	Lng	TD
1973	BUF	12	0	0	0	0.0	0	0
1974	BUF	14	0	0	0	0.0	0	0
1975	ATL	14	3	13	270	**20.8**	67	4
1976	ATL	14	0	2	24	12.0	12	0
1977	ATL	14	14	26	390	15.0	32	1
1978	ATL	**16**	**16**	45	695	15.4	54	3
1979	ATL	**16**	**16**	**74**	**1,013**	13.7	42	**8**
1980	ATL	**16**	**16**	54	862	16.0	**81**	7
1981	ATL	**16**	**16**	30	441	14.7	36	4
		132	81	244	3,695	15.1	81	27

=== Playoffs ===
Year	Team	Games		Receiving				
Year	Team	GP	GS	Rec	Yds	Avg	Lng	TD
1974	BUF	1	0	0	0	0.0	0	0
1978	ATL	**2**	**2**	**12**	**201**	**16.8**	**49**	**2**
1980	ATL	1	1	6	66	11.0	18	0
		4	3	18	267	14.8	49	2
