= Alfred Jenkins =

American football player (born 1952)

No. 84
- Position: Wide receiver

Personal information
- Born: January 25, 1952 (age 74); Hogansville, Georgia, U.S.
- Listed height: 5 ft 10 in (1.78 m)
- Listed weight: 170 lb (77 kg)

Career information
- College: Morris Brown
- NFL draft: 1975: undrafted

Career history
- Birmingham Americans (1974); Atlanta Falcons (1975–1983)

Awards and highlights
- First-team All-Pro (1981); 2× Pro Bowl (1980, 1981); NFL receiving touchdowns co-leader (1981); NFL receiving yards leader (1981); All-WFL (1974)

Career NFL statistics
- Receptions: 360
- Receiving yards: 6,267
- Receiving touchdowns: 40
- Stats at Pro Football Reference

Alfred Donnell Jenkins (born January 25, 1952) is an American former professional football player who was a wide receiver for the Birmingham Americans in 1974 and nine seasons for the Atlanta Falcons from 1975 through 1983. Jenkins was selected to the Pro Bowl during the 1980 and 1981 seasons and is considered the most successful National Football League (NFL) player from the short-lived World Football League (WFL).

Jenkins played college football in Atlanta for the Morris Brown Wolverines and was not selected in the 1974 NFL draft. He received a tryout and signed with the WFL's Birmingham Americans. He scored 14 touchdowns and caught 62 passes for 1,471 yards while helping the Americans win the WFL's only championship that season. After the Americans folded, Jenkins signed with the Falcons on April 9, 1975. He became a mainstay at wide receiver, starting every game in each of his NFL seasons (with the exception of 1978, in which he played only one game before suffering a broken collarbone). Jenkins led the NFL in receiving yards (1,358) and receiving touchdowns (13) in the 1981 season.

== NFL career statistics ==
Legend
	Led the league
**Bold**	Career high

=== Regular season ===
Year	Team	Games		Receiving				
Year	Team	GP	GS	Rec	Yds	Avg	Lng	TD
1975	ATL	14	14	38	767	**20.2**	68	6
1976	ATL	14	14	41	710	17.3	34	6
1977	ATL	14	14	39	677	17.4	**73**	4
1978	ATL	1	1	2	28	14.0	22	0
1979	ATL	**16**	**16**	50	858	17.2	57	3
1980	ATL	**16**	**16**	58	1,035	17.8	57	6
1981	ATL	**16**	**16**	**70**	**1,358**	19.4	67	**13**
1982	ATL	9	9	24	347	14.5	43	1
1983	ATL	10	10	38	487	12.8	26	1
		110	110	360	6,267	17.4	73	40

=== Playoffs ===
Year	Team	Games		Receiving				
Year	Team	GP	GS	Rec	Yds	Avg	Lng	TD
1980	ATL	**1**	**1**	**4**	**155**	**38.8**	**60**	**1**
1982	ATL	**1**	**1**	2	52	26.0	30	0
		2	2	6	207	34.5	60	1
