= Jerome King =

American football player (born 1955)

No. 33, 30
- Position: Defensive back

Personal information
- Born: January 4, 1955 (age 71); Jersey City, New Jersey
- Listed height: 5 ft 10 in (1.78 m)
- Listed weight: 175 lb (79 kg)

Career information
- High school: Lincoln
- College: Purdue
- NFL draft: 1978: undrafted

Career history
- St. Louis Cardinals (1979)*; Atlanta Falcons (1979–1980); New York Giants (1980); Philadelphia Stars (1983)
- * Offseason or practice squad member only
- Stats at Pro Football Reference

Jerome Manual King (born January 4, 1955) is an American former professional football player who was a defensive back for the Atlanta Falcons and the New York Giants of the National Football League (NFL). He played college football for the Purdue Boilermakers.
