= Steve Bartkowski =

American football player (born 1952)

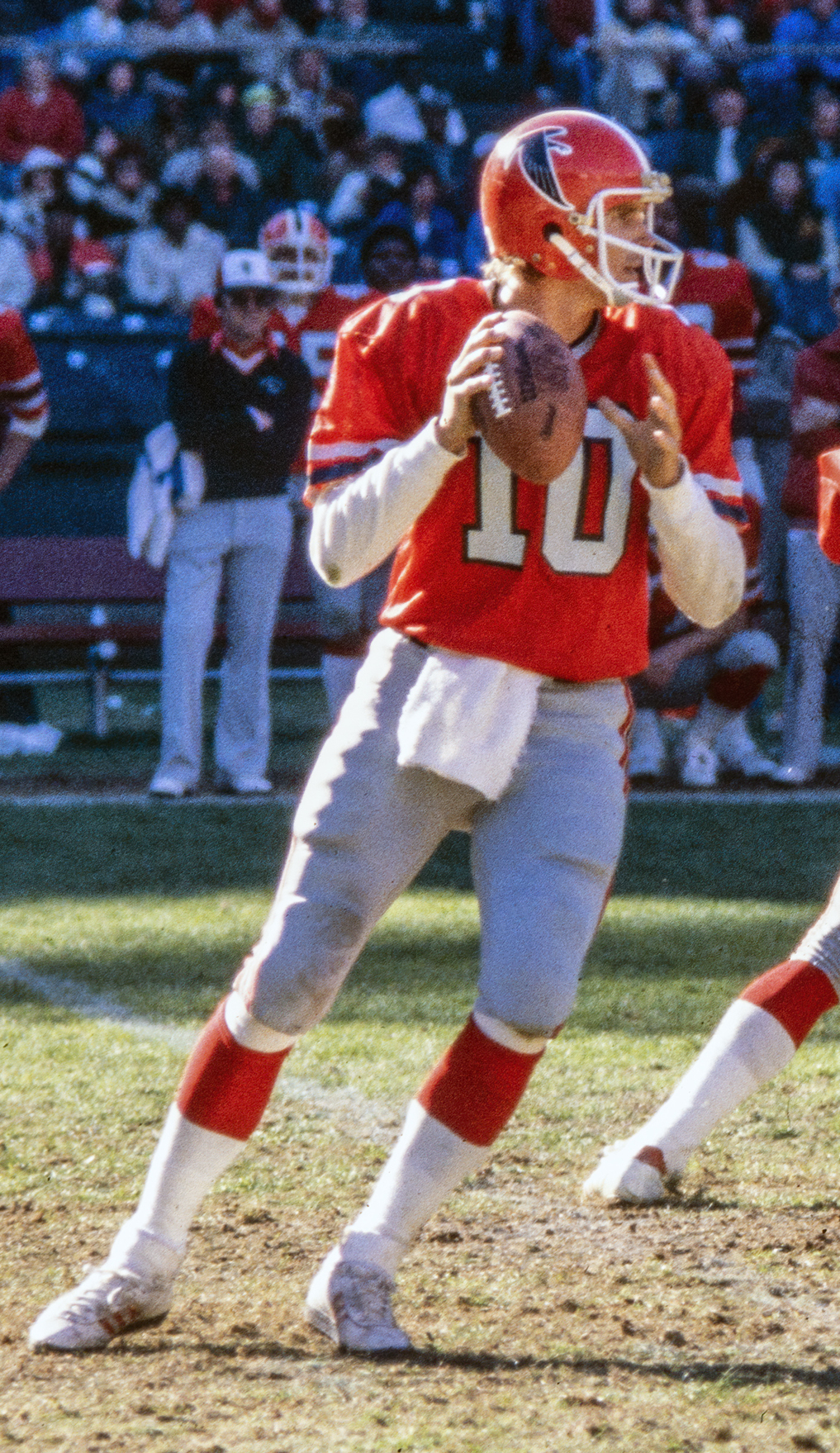
- Bartkowski with the Atlanta Falcons in 1982

No. 10
- Position: Quarterback

Personal information
- Born: November 12, 1952 (age 73); Des Moines, Iowa, U.S.
- Listed height: 6 ft 4 in (1.93 m)
- Listed weight: 213 lb (97 kg)

Career information
- High school: Buchser (Santa Clara, California)
- College: California
- NFL draft: 1975: 1st round, 1st overall pick

Career history
- Atlanta Falcons (1975–1985); Washington Redskins (1985); Los Angeles Rams (1986)

Awards and highlights
- 2× Pro Bowl (1980, 1981); NFL passing touchdowns leader (1980); NFL passer rating leader (1983); NFL completion percentage leader (1984); PFWA All-Rookie Team (1975); Atlanta Falcons Ring of Honor; Consensus All-American (1974); NCAA passing yards leader (1974); First-team All-Pac-8 (1974)

Career NFL statistics
- Passing attempts: 3,456
- Passing completions: 1,932
- Completion percentage: 55.9%
- TD–INT: 156–144
- Passing yards: 24,124
- Passer rating: 75.4
- Stats at Pro Football Reference
- College Football Hall of Fame

Steven Joseph Bartkowski (born November 12, 1952) is an American former professional football player who was a quarterback in the National Football League (NFL) for the Atlanta Falcons (1975–1985), Washington Redskins (1985) and the Los Angeles Rams (1986). He was a two-time Pro Bowl selection. Bartkowski played college football for the California Golden Bears, earning consensus All-American honors as a senior in 1974. He was selected by the Falcons with the first overall pick of the 1975 NFL draft.

== College career ==
Bartkowski attended the University of California, Berkeley. In 1972, he threw for 944 yards with four touchdowns and 13 interceptions. In 1973, he threw for 910 yards with four touchdowns and seven interceptions. As a senior with the Golden Bears in 1974, Bartkowski was a consensus All-American and led the nation in passing. He threw for 2,580 yards, 12 touchdowns, and seven interceptions. He completed 182 passes out of 325 attempts. In addition to playing football, Bartkowski was also an All-American baseball player at first base for the Bears.

== Professional career ==
Bartkowski was chosen with the first overall pick in the 1975 NFL draft by the Atlanta Falcons (after the Falcons acquired the pick in a trade with the Colts). Bartkowski was the NFL Rookie of the Year as well as The Sporting News NFC Rookie of the Year in 1975. He was the first client of sports agent Leigh Steinberg.

Bartkowski is one of ten quarterbacks in NFL history who have achieved consecutive 30-touchdown passing seasons (1980 and 1981) at least one time in their career. Bartkowski was selected to the Pro Bowl after both the 1980 and 1981 seasons and was selected 2nd Team All-NFC following the 1980 campaign. Bartkowski led the NFL in passing in 1983 with a passer rating of 97.6. Bartkowski set the record for consecutive games with at least three touchdown passes at home with five which he established over the 1980 and 1981 seasons. The record was held until the 2004 season when it was surpassed by Peyton Manning.

In 1984, Bartkowski started the Falcons' first 11 games, but was injured late in the season and replaced by Mike Moroski. Bartkowski began 1985 as the starter, but an 0–5 start led to his benching and losing the job to David Archer. He was placed on the injured reserve list before the eighth game and then released in November.

On December 12, 1985, Bartkowski signed with the Washington Redskins on a two-week contract. He was added to their roster as an emergency quarterback, due to the starter, Jay Schroeder, playing with a fractured rib. Bartkowski served as the third-string quarterback for Washington's final two regular season games.

The Los Angeles Rams signed Bartkowski in the 1986 pre-season when holdover Dieter Brock suffered a season- (and career-) ending injury. Bartkowski started six of the Rams' first seven games and the team was 4–2 in those games, but Bartkowski was largely ineffective and lost the starting job to Steve Dils. The Rams would eventually turn the reins over to rookie Jim Everett. Bartkowski retired after the 1986 season.

Bartkowski was inducted into the Georgia Sports Hall of Fame on May 19, 2007.

== NFL career statistics ==
Legend
	Pro Bowl selection
	Led the league
**Bold**	Career high

=== Regular season ===
Year	Team	Games			Passing								
Year	Team	GP	GS	Record	Cmp	Att	Pct	Yds	Avg	TD	Int	Lng	Rtg
1975	ATL	11	11	4–7	115	255	45.1	1,662	6.5	13	15	68	59.3
1976	ATL	5	5	1–4	57	120	47.5	677	5.6	2	9	50	39.5
1977	ATL	8	7	3−4	64	136	47.1	796	5.9	5	13	73	38.4
1978	ATL	14	13	8−5	187	369	50.7	2,489	6.7	10	18	71	61.1
1979	ATL	14	14	6−8	204	380	53.7	2,505	6.6	17	20	57	67.3
1980	ATL	**16**	**16**	**12−4**	257	463	55.5	3,544	7.7	**31**	16	81	88.2
1981	ATL	**16**	**16**	7–9	**297**	**533**	55.7	**3,829**	7.2	30	23	70	79.2
1982	ATL	9	9	5−4	166	262	63.4	1,905	7.3	8	11	**86**	77.9
1983	ATL	14	14	6−8	274	432	63.4	3,167	7.3	22	5	76	**97.6**
1984	ATL	11	11	3−8	181	269	**67.3**	2,158	**8.0**	11	10	61	89.7
1985	ATL	5	5	0−5	69	111	62.2	738	6.6	5	**1**	62	92.8
1986	LAR	6	6	4−2	61	126	48.4	654	5.2	2	3	42	59.4
Career		129	127	59–68	1,932	3,456	55.9	24,124	7.0	156	144	86	75.4

== Post-NFL career ==
Bartkowski is currently on the Falcons Board of Advisors. He has a wife, Sandee, and two sons, Philip and Peter, and resides outside Atlanta. Bartkowski's elder son, Philip is married to Robin Fortin, the sister of former Falcons lineman Roman Fortin. In 1993, Bartkowski was inducted into the National Polish American Sports Hall of Fame and in 2012, he was inducted into the College Football Hall of Fame.

== See also ==
- List of NCAA major college football yearly passing leaders
