= Mike Smith (wide receiver) =

American football player (born 1958)

No. 86
- Position: Wide receiver

Personal information
- Born: April 28, 1958 (age 68); Bastrop, Louisiana, U.S.
- Listed height: 5 ft 10 in (1.78 m)
- Listed weight: 194 lb (88 kg)

Career information
- High school: Bastrop
- College: Grambling State
- NFL draft: 1980: 7th round, 172nd overall pick

Career history
- Atlanta Falcons (1980); Edmonton Eskimos (1982)*; Toronto Argonauts (1982)*; Arizona Wranglers (1983); Oakland Invaders (1984)*
- * Offseason or practice squad member only
- Stats at Pro Football Reference

Michael T. Smith (born April 28, 1958) is an American former professional football player who was a wide receiver for the Atlanta Falcons of the National Football League (NFL) in 1980. He played college football for the Grambling State Tigers. He was selected 172nd overall in the seventh round of the 1980 NFL draft by the Falcons.
