= Doug Rogers (American football) =

American football player (born 1960)

No. 77, 65
- Position: Defensive end

Personal information
- Born: June 23, 1960 (age 66); Chico, California, U.S.
- Listed height: 6 ft 5 in (1.96 m)
- Listed weight: 266 lb (121 kg)

Career information
- High school: Highland (Bakersfield, California)
- College: Stanford
- NFL draft: 1982: 2nd round, 36th overall pick

Career history
- Atlanta Falcons (1982–1983); New England Patriots (1983-1984); San Francisco 49ers (1986)

Awards and highlights
- Second-team All-Pac-10 (1981)

Career NFL statistics
- Sacks: 4.5
- Stats at Pro Football Reference

Doug Rogers (born June 23, 1960) is an American former professional football player who was a defensive lineman for five seasons in the National Football League (NFL) for the Atlanta Falcons, New England Patriots, and San Francisco 49ers. He played college football for the Stanford Cardinal and was selected in the second round of the 1982 NFL draft with the 36th overall pick.
