= Junior Miller =

American football player (born 1957)

No. 80, 84
- Position: Tight end

Personal information
- Born: November 26, 1957 (age 68); Waco, Texas, U.S.
- Listed height: 6 ft 4 in (1.93 m)
- Listed weight: 239 lb (108 kg)

Career information
- High school: Robert E. Lee (Midland, Texas)
- College: Nebraska
- NFL draft: 1980: 1st round, 7th overall pick

Career history
- Atlanta Falcons (1980–1983); New Orleans Saints (1984); Dallas Cowboys (1986)*
- * Offseason or practice squad member only

Awards and highlights
- 2× Pro Bowl (1980, 1981); PFWA All-Rookie Team (1980); Unanimous All-American (1979); Third-team All-American (1978); 2× First-team All-Big Eight (1978, 1979)

Career NFL statistics
- Receptions: 122
- Receiving yards: 1,409
- Touchdowns: 14
- Stats at Pro Football Reference

Selvia Miller Jr. (born November 26, 1957) is an American former professional football player who was a tight end in the National Football League (NFL) for five seasons during the 1980s. Miller played college football for the Nebraska Cornhuskers and earned All-American honors. He was selected seventh overall in the first round of the 1980 NFL draft, played professionally for the Atlanta Falcons and New Orleans Saints of the NFL, and was twice selected to the Pro Bowl.

Miller was born in Midland, Texas. He attended Robert E. Lee High School in Midland, and was a standout high school football player for the Lee Rebels. He was the nephew of Navy Cross winner Doris Miller.

He attended the University of Nebraska–Lincoln, where he played for coach Tom Osborne's Conhusker teams from 1976 to 1979. As a senior in 1979, he was recognized as a consensus first-team All-American.

The Atlanta Falcons chose Miller in the first round (seventh pick overall) of the 1980 NFL Draft, and he played for the Falcons from 1980 to 1983. He was selected for the Pro Bowl in 1980 and 1981. Miller previously held the Atlanta Falcons' franchise record for most receiving touchdowns by a rookie with 9, it was broken in 2018 by Calvin Ridley who had 10. He played his fifth and final NFL season for the New Orleans Saints in 1984.

== NFL career statistics ==
Legend
**Bold**	Career high

=== Regular season ===
Year	Team	Games		Receiving				
Year	Team	GP	GS	Rec	Yds	Avg	Lng	TD
1980	ATL	**16**	14	**46**	**584**	**12.7**	36	**9**
1981	ATL	**16**	**16**	32	398	12.4	37	3
1982	ATL	9	9	20	221	11.1	**39**	1
1983	ATL	15	6	16	125	7.8	19	0
1984	NOR	15	0	8	81	10.1	22	1
		71	45	122	1,409	11.5	39	14

=== Playoffs ===
Year	Team	Games		Receiving				
Year	Team	GP	GS	Rec	Yds	Avg	Lng	TD
1980	ATL	1	1	3	48	16.0	26	0
		1	1	3	48	16.0	26	0
