= William Curran (American football) =

American football player (born 1959)

No. 89
- Position: Wide receiver

Personal information
- Born: December 30, 1959 (age 66); Inglewood, California, U.S.
- Listed height: 5 ft 10 in (1.78 m)
- Listed weight: 175 lb (79 kg)

Career information
- High school: Crespi Carmelite
- College: UCLA
- NFL draft: 1982: undrafted

Career history
- Atlanta Falcons (1982–1984)

Career NFL statistics
- Games played: 37
- Stats at Pro Football Reference

William Martin Curran (born December 30, 1959) is an American former professional football player who was a wide receiver in the National Football League (NFL) for three seasons. He played college football for the UCLA Bruins.

== Professional career ==
Willie signed with the Atlanta Falcons as an undrafted free agent following the 1982 NFL draft. He saw action in 37 games over three seasons, mostly on special teams. In the 1984 season, Curran returned kicks and punts.

== Post-playing career ==
In 2012, Curran was one of over 4,000 former football players to join a class-action lawsuit against the NFL over concussion-related brain injuries. In the lawsuit, Curran claimed that chronic head trauma suffered during his playing career has left him with a number of cognitive issues and health problems.

Since leaving Professional Football, William M Curran IV has a continuing career in the financial services industry for over 39 yrs. The last 10 years as a Private Banker.

== Personal life ==
Curran lives with his wife Heather in Windsor, California. Now lives in New Braunfels, TX.
