= Lyman White =

American football player (born 1959)

No. 52
- Position: Linebacker

Personal information
- Born: January 3, 1959 (age 67); Lafayette, Louisiana, U.S.
- Listed height: 6 ft 0 in (1.83 m)
- Listed weight: 217 lb (98 kg)

Career information
- High school: Franklin (LA)
- College: LSU
- NFL draft: 1981: 2nd round, 54th overall pick

Career history
- Atlanta Falcons (1981–1982)

Awards and highlights
- 2× First-team All-SEC (1979, 1980); Second-team All-SEC (1978)

Career NFL statistics
- Games played: 18
- Games started: 1
- Stats at Pro Football Reference

Lyman Dan White Jr. (born January 3, 1959) is an American former professional football player who was a linebacker in the National Football League (NFL). White was selected in the second round by the Atlanta Falcons out of Louisiana State University in the 1981 NFL draft.
