= James Mayberry =

American football player (born 1957)

No. 39
- Position: Running back

Personal information
- Born: November 5, 1957 (age 69); Amarillo, Texas, U.S.
- Listed height: 5 ft 11 in (1.80 m)
- Listed weight: 210 lb (95 kg)

Career information
- High school: Tascosa (TX)
- College: Colorado
- NFL draft: 1979: 3rd round, 75th overall pick

Career history
- Atlanta Falcons (1979–1981)

Awards and highlights
- 2× Second-team All-Big Eight (1977, 1978)

Career NFL statistics
- Rushing yards: 347
- Rushing average: 4.3
- Rushing touchdowns: 1
- Stats at Pro Football Reference

James Loyd Mayberry (born November 5, 1957) is an American former professional football player who was a running back for the Atlanta Falcons of the National Football League (NFL). He played college football for the Colorado Buffaloes. He also played in the USFL for the Washington Federals.

In Mayberry's first professional football game, the Falcons faced the rival New Orleans Saints in the Louisiana Superdome. With the game tied 34–34 in sudden death overtime, Mayberry intercepted a hurried chest pass by Saints punter Russell Erxleben, who was forced to retrieve the ball at the goal line after a high snap by long snapper John Watson. Mayberry caught the ball in stride at the 6-yard line and waltzed untouched into the end zone to give the Falcons a 40–34 victory, Atlanta's third consecutive win over New Orleans in which the Falcons scored the game-winning touchdown in the final seconds of regulation or overtime. The loss ended up keeping the Saints from their first winning season, as they finished 8-8.
