= Chuck Correal =

American football player (born 1956)

No. 53
- Position: Center

Personal information
- Born: May 17, 1956 (age 70); Uniontown, Pennsylvania, U.S.
- Listed height: 6 ft 3 in (1.91 m)
- Listed weight: 247 lb (112 kg)

Career information
- High school: Laurel Highlands (Uniontown)
- College: Penn State
- NFL draft: 1979: 8th round, 196th overall pick

Career history
- Philadelphia Eagles (1979)*; Atlanta Falcons (1979,1980); Cleveland Browns (1981); Pittsburgh Maulers (1984)
- * Offseason or practice squad member only

Awards and highlights
- First-team All-East (1978); Played in East-West Shrine Bowl and Senior Bowl
- Stats at Pro Football Reference

Charles Alan Correal (born May 17, 1956) is an American former professional football player who was a center in the National Football League (NFL). He played college football for the Penn State Nittany Lions. Correal played in the NFL for the Atlanta Falcons in 1979, 1980, Cleveland Browns in 1981, and for the Pittsburgh Maulers of the United States Football League (USFL) in 1984. Only center in Penn State history to be named Player of the Game. (1977 vs Miami Hurricanes).
