= William Andrews (American football) =

American football player (born 1955)

No. 31
- Position: Running back

Personal information
- Born: December 25, 1955 (age 70); Thomasville, Georgia, U.S.
- Listed height: 6 ft 0 in (1.83 m)
- Listed weight: 206 lb (93 kg)

Career information
- High school: Thomasville (GA)
- College: Auburn (1976–1978)
- NFL draft: 1979: 3rd round, 79th overall pick

Career history
- Atlanta Falcons (1979–1986)

Awards and highlights
- 2× Second-team All-Pro (1981, 1982); 4× Pro Bowl (1980–1983); PFWA All-Rookie Team (1979); George Halas Award (1987); Atlanta Falcons Ring of Honor

Career NFL statistics
- Rushing yards: 5,986
- Rushing average: 4.6
- Rushing touchdowns: 30
- Stats at Pro Football Reference

William L. Andrews (born December 25, 1955) is an American former professional football player who was a running back for the Atlanta Falcons of the National Football League (NFL).

== Career ==
Andrews played collegiately at Auburn University along with future NFL backs James Brooks and Joe Cribbs.

Andrews was selected by the Falcons in the third round of the 1979 NFL draft. While he was primarily used as a blocking back in college, Andrews excelled as a blocker, runner and pass catcher during his pro career. He would make an immediate impact, finishing with 167 yards rushing in his NFL debut as the Falcons defeated the New Orleans Saints, 40–34. Playing in 15 games, Andrews finished his rookie season with 1,023 yards rushing and was named to the all-rookie team. In 1980, Andrews helped lead the Falcons to a 12–4 record and a first-place finish in the NFC West division. He finished the season with 1,308 yards rushing, averaged 4.9 yards per attempt and also caught 51 passes for 456 yards. The season was the first of four straight in which Andrews was selected to play in the Pro Bowl.

While the Falcons record slipped in 1981, Andrews would have another great season. He led the NFL in yards from scrimmage with 2,036, again went over 1,300 yards rushing and scored a career-high 12 touchdowns (10 rushing, 2 receiving). Andrews became one of the first running backs in the NFL, along with Tony Dorsett, John Brockington, Ottis Anderson and Earl Campbell, to gain at least 1,000 yards in each of his first three seasons. Andrews was also fourth in receptions that season with 81. Andrews finished the strike-shortened 1982 season second in the NFL in yards from scrimmage with 1,076 and helped the Falcons return to the postseason.

In 1983, Andrews had his best season yet statistically. He was second in the NFL in rushing with 1,567 yards, second in rushing yards per game with an average of 97.9 and caught for 59 passes for 609 yards. His also finished second in yards from scrimmage with a total of 2,176. At season's end, he was named All-Pro by both the NEA and The Sporting News.

In the prime of his career, Andrews sustained a serious knee injury during the 1984 preseason that sidelined him for two years. He returned in 1986 for one season, largely as a tight end. He rushed for 214 yards on 52 attempts and scored 1 touchdown before retiring from the NFL with a career total of 5,986 yards rushing. At the time of his retirement, Andrews ranked 24th in NFL history in rushing yards.

== Reception ==
In his prime, Andrews was regarded as arguably the most bruising, powerful running back in the NFL. Ronnie Lott would later state that a head-on-collision he had with Andrews during a game between the San Francisco 49ers and the Falcons on December 19, 1982, was the hardest hit that he had received during his NFL career. In addition to leading the NFL in yards from scrimmage in 1981, Andrews also finished in the top four in that category three other times. He was named as the Falcons Player of the Year in both 1981 and 1983. Andrews was inducted into the Georgia Sports Hall of Fame in 1996 and the Alabama Sports Hall of Fame in 2022.

== NFL career statistics ==
Year	Team	Games		Rushing					Receiving				
Year	Team	GP	GS	Att	Yds	Avg	Lng	TD	Rec	Yds	Avg	Lng	TD
1979	ATL	15	15	239	1,023	4.3	23	3	39	309	7.9	34	2
1980	ATL	16	16	265	1,308	4.9	33	4	51	456	8.9	26	1
1981	ATL	16	16	289	1,301	4.5	29	10	81	735	9.1	70	2
1982	ATL	9	9	139	573	4.1	19	5	42	503	12.0	86	2
1983	ATL	16	16	331	1,567	4.7	27	7	59	609	10.3	40	4
1984	ATL	0	0	Did not play due to injury									
1985	ATL	0	0	Did not play due to injury									
1986	ATL	15	0	52	214	4.1	13	1	5	35	7.0	14	0
Career		87	72	1,315	5,986	4.6	33	30	277	2,647	9.6	86	11
