= Floyd Hodge =

American football player (born 1959)

No. 83
- Position: Wide receiver

Personal information
- Born: July 18, 1959 (age 67); Compton, California, U.S.
- Listed height: 6 ft 0 in (1.83 m)
- Listed weight: 195 lb (88 kg)

Career information
- High school: Centennial (Compton)
- College: Utah
- NFL draft: 1981: undrafted

Career history
- Atlanta Falcons (1981–1984)

Career NFL statistics
- Receptions: 63
- Receiving yards: 674
- Touchdowns: 4
- Stats at Pro Football Reference

Floyd Hodge (born July 18, 1959) is an American former professional football player who was a wide receiver for the Atlanta Falcons of the National Football League (NFL). He played college football for the Utah Utes.

== College career ==
A native of Compton, California, Hodge played two years of football at Los Angeles Valley College, where he was also a long jumper on the track and field team. In 1979, Hodge emerged as an option quarterback at the University of Utah and became a starter midway through the season. As a senior in 1980, he played wide receiver for the Utes and caught 44 passes for 829 yards and five touchdowns.

== Professional career ==
Hodge signed a free agent deal with the Atlanta Falcons in 1981. However, he spent the entire 1981 season on the injured reserve list. Hodge caught two touchdowns in his debut, a preseason win over the Minnesota Vikings in August 1982.

Hodge was cut by the Falcons in August 1985 after the team had acquired receiver Charlie Brown in a trade with the Washington Redskins. "I started counting receivers, and I knew something was up," said Hodge.
