= Neal Musser (American football) =

American football player (born 1957)

No. 53
- Position: Linebacker

Personal information
- Born: March 20, 1957 (age 69); Elon, North Carolina, U.S.
- Listed height: 6 ft 2 in (1.88 m)
- Listed weight: 220 lb (100 kg)

Career information
- High school: Western Alamance (Elon)
- College: NC State
- NFL draft: 1981: undrafted

Career history
- Atlanta Falcons (1981–1983); Jacksonville Bulls (1985)*
- * Offseason or practice squad member only
- Stats at Pro Football Reference

James Neal Musser (born March 20, 1957) is an American former professional football linebacker who played for the Atlanta Falcons of the National Football League (NFL). He played college football for the NC State Wolfpack.

== Early life ==
James Neal Musser was born on March 20, 1957, in Elon, North Carolina. He participated in high school football, wrestling, and track at Western Alamance High School in Elon. He was inducted into the Western Alamance Athletic Hall of Fame in 2023.

== College career ==
Musser played junior college football at Lees–McRae College from 1977 to 1978. He transferred to North Carolina State University, where he was a two-year letterman for the Wolfpack from 1979 to 1980. As a senior in 1980, he recorded 126 tackles (second-most on the team), one interception, and two forced fumbles.

== Professional career ==
After going undrafted in the 1981 NFL draft, Musser signed with the Atlanta Falcons on May 5. He played in the first seven games of the 1981 season as a reserve linebacker and special teams player, recording one interception and one forced fumble, before being placed on injured reserve on October 21 with a knee injury. He was placed on injured reserve again the next year on September 13, 1982. He was activated on November 19 and appeared in eight regular season games and one playoff game for the Falcons during the 1982 season. Musser was placed on injured reserve for the third time on August 22, 1983, and missed the entire 1983 season. He was released on May 21, 1984.

Musser signed with the Jacksonville Bulls for the 1985 USFL season. He was released on January 28, 1985, several weeks before the start of the regular season.

== Personal life ==
As of 2023, Musser had lived in Wilmington, North Carolina for nearly four decades. He owned a landscaping business.
