= Eric Sanders (offensive lineman) =

American football player (born 1958)

No. 67, 64
- Position: Offensive tackle

Personal information
- Born: October 22, 1958 (age 68); Reno, Nevada, U.S.
- Listed height: 6 ft 6 in (1.98 m)
- Listed weight: 277 lb (126 kg)

Career information
- High school: Earl Wooster (Reno)
- College: Nevada
- NFL draft: 1981: 5th round, 136th overall pick

Career history
- Atlanta Falcons (1981–1986); Detroit Lions (1986-1992)

Career NFL statistics
- Games played: 158
- Games started: 42
- Fumble recoveries: 2
- Stats at Pro Football Reference

Eric Downer Sanders (born October 22, 1958) is an American former professional football player who was a guard and tackle for 12 seasons in the National Football League (NFL). He played for the Atlanta Falcons from 1981 to 1986 and the Detroit Lions from 1986 to 1992. He played college football for the Nevada Wolf Pack.
