= Eddie LeBaron =

American gridiron football player and executive (1930–2015)

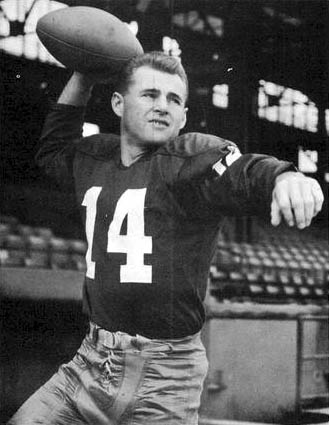
- LeBaron in 1958

No. 14, 15
- Position: Quarterback

Personal information
- Born: January 7, 1930; San Rafael, California, U.S.
- Died: April 1, 2015 (aged 85); Stockton, California, U.S.
- Listed height: 5 ft 7 in (1.70 m)
- Listed weight: 168 lb (76 kg)

Career information
- High school: Oakdale (Oakdale, California)
- College: Pacific (CA) (1946–1949); Quantico (1950)
- NFL draft: 1950: 10th round, 123rd overall pick

Career history

Playing
- Washington Redskins (1952–1953); Calgary Stampeders (1954); Washington Redskins (1955–1959); Dallas Cowboys (1960–1963)

Operations
- Atlanta Falcons (1977–1981) General manager

Awards and highlights
- NFL Rookie of the Year (1952); 4× Pro Bowl (1955, 1957, 1958, 1962); NFL passer rating leader (1962); 80 Greatest Redskins; Washington Commanders Ring of Fame; Second-team All-American (1949); 3× First-team Little All-American (1947–1949); Pop Warner Trophy (1949); First-team All-PCC (1949); Pacific Tigers No. 40 retired

Career NFL statistics
- Passing attempts: 1,796
- Passing completions: 898
- Completion percentage: 50.0%
- TD–INT: 104–141
- Passing yards: 13,399
- Passer rating: 61.4
- Rushing yards: 650
- Rushing touchdowns: 9
- Military career
- Allegiance: United States
- Branch: United States Marine Corps
- Service years: 1950–1952
- Rank: First Lieutenant
- Unit: 1st Battalion, 7th Marine Regiment
- Conflicts: Korean War; Battle of the Punchbowl
- Awards: Bronze Star Medal; "V" device
- Stats at Pro Football Reference
- Executive profile at Pro Football Reference
- College Football Hall of Fame

Edward Wayne LeBaron Jr. (January 7, 1930 – April 1, 2015) was an American Korean War veteran, United States Marine officer, and professional football player. He played as a quarterback in the National Football League (NFL) and Canadian Football League (CFL).

LeBaron played college football for the Pacific Tigers and was selected by the Washington Redskins in the 10th round of the 1950 NFL draft. Following his service in the United States Marine Corps during the Korean War, and subsequent honorary discharge, LeBaron started for the Redskins during the 1952 season, winning NFL Rookie of the Year. In 1960, LeBaron became the first starting quarterback of the Dallas Cowboys, eventually splitting playing time with protégé Don Meredith from the 1960 to 1963 seasons. LeBaron was selected to four Pro Bowls during his NFL career. Following his retirement, LeBaron served as a general manager of the Atlanta Falcons from 1977 to 1981.

== Early life ==
Born in San Rafael, California, LeBaron graduated from Oakdale High School in Oakdale, northeast of Modesto.

== College career ==
LeBaron enrolled at the College of the Pacific in Stockton as a 16-year-old. He played college football for the Tigers under Amos Alonzo Stagg and Larry Siemering from 1946 to 1949, lettering all four years and achieving All-American honors as a senior. The Tigers registered an undefeated season (11–0) in 1949, led the nation in total offense (502.9 yards a game), and set an NCAA single-season record of 575 points. LeBaron was a two-way, 60-minute player, as a quarterback on offense, safety on defense, and punter on special teams. He also played one year of baseball for the Tigers as a catcher.

He left the school after re-writing many of the football records: career touchdowns (59), touchdowns in a season (23), longest punt (74 yards), most yardage off interception returns in a game (119), most times leading the team in total offense (3).

He was inducted into the College Football Hall of Fame in 1980, into the Bay Area Sports Hall of Fame in 2004 and was a charter inductee into the Sac-Joaquin Section Hall of Fame in October 2010.

LeBaron's #40 worn during his career at Pacific was retired by the university.

== Military service ==
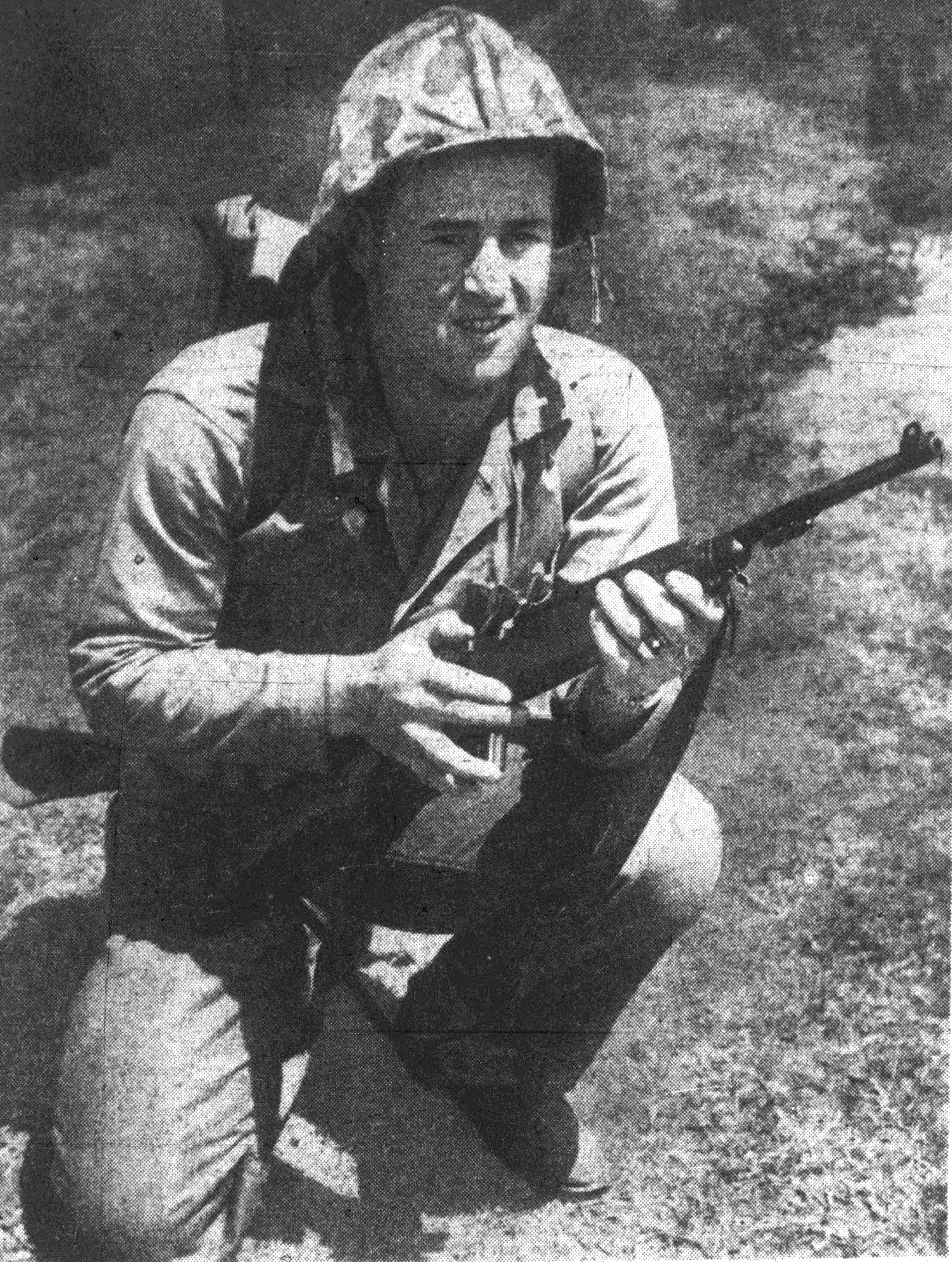
LeBaron as a member of the Marine Corps Reserve during the Korean War, circa 1951.

LeBaron at age 18, joined the Marine Corps Reserve. After the Korean War broke out in June 1950, he was called to active duty and commissioned a second lieutenant in August. After completing Marine Basic School at Quantico, Virginia in March 1951, he was sent to South Korea in April. In September, he served as a rifle company platoon commander with 2nd Platoon, B Company, 1st Battalion, 7th Marine Regiment, 1st Marine Division during the fighting for Hill 673 in the Battle of the Punchbowl. LeBaron was wounded twice and was decorated with the Bronze Star Medal with Combat "V" for heroism. He was honorably discharged as a first lieutenant in 1952. Due to his diminutive size, 5 feet 7 inches (1.70 m), and leadership skills from his military service, he was sometimes known as the "Littlest General".

While in the Marines, LeBaron played football for the Quantico Marines Devil Dogs, helping lead the team to a 61–21 win over the VPI Gobblers (now known as the Virginia Tech Hokies) in 1950.

In 2008, LeBaron was inducted into the U.S. Marine Corps Sports Hall of Fame.

== Professional career ==
=== Washington Redskins (first stint) ===
LeBaron was selected by the Washington Redskins in the tenth round (123rd overall) of the 1950 NFL draft, but had to leave training camp to perform military service during the Korean War. At 5 ft 7 in (1.70 m), he was one of the shortest quarterbacks in the history of the NFL.

He returned to the NFL in 1952 after a two-year commitment to the United States Marine Corps as a lieutenant, when he was discharged after being wounded in combat. He replaced future hall of famer Sammy Baugh in the starting lineup after the fourth game and received All-Rookie honors at the end of the season. The next year, he was limited with a knee injury and also shared the starting position with Jack Scarbath.

=== Calgary Stampeders ===
In 1954, the Western Interprovincial Football Union (a predecessor of the Canadian Football League) raided the NFL talent to improve its level of play. LeBaron signed with the Calgary Stampeders along with his Redskins teammate Gene Brito, because his college coach Larry Siemering was named the team's head coach. He registered 1,815 passing yards, 8 touchdowns and 24 interceptions during the season. He also played defensive back and punter. He decided to return to the NFL at the end of the year, after the team fired Siemering.

=== Washington Redskins (second stint) ===
On December 9, 1954, he re-signed with the Washington Redskins. In 1958, he was the league's top-rated quarterback, after completing 79 out of 149 passes for 1,365 yards and 11 touchdowns. He announced his retirement to focus on his law practice at the end of the 1959 season.

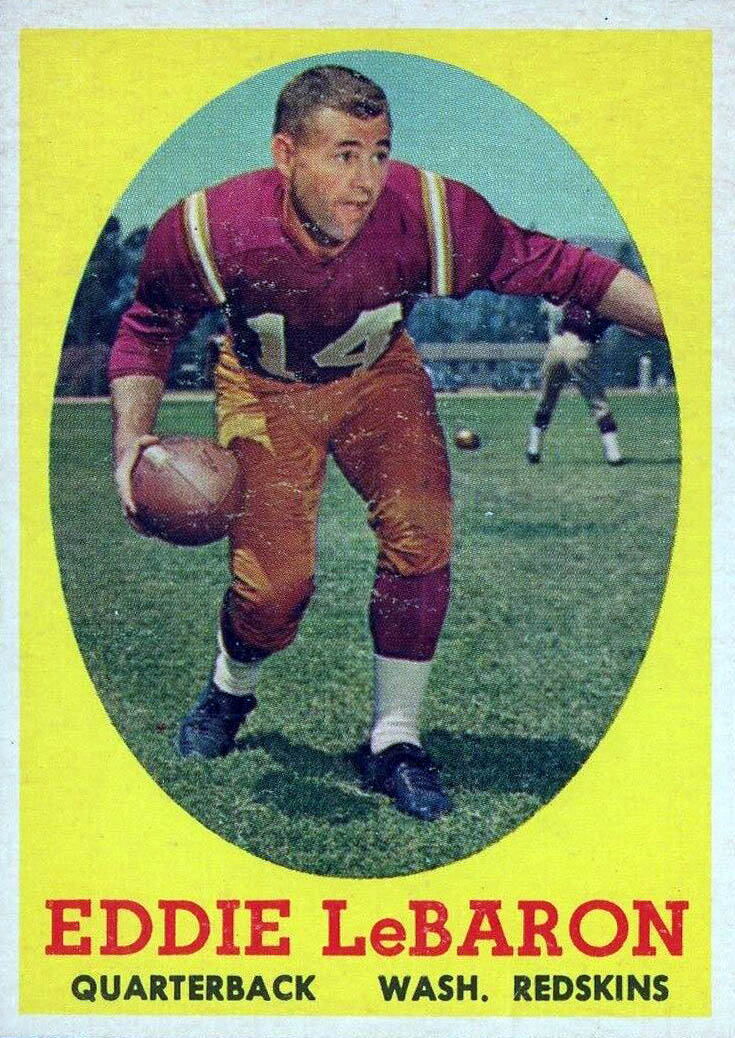
LeBaron's 1958 Topps trading card.

In his seven seasons with the Redskins he started 55 of a possible 72 games at quarterback (he played in 70 of those 72 games). He was also the primary punter for his first three seasons with Washington (punting 171 times for a total of 6,995 yards in five seasons).

=== Dallas Cowboys ===
After not being able to participate in the 1960 NFL draft during their inaugural year of existence, the Dallas Cowboys traded their first round (#2-Norm Snead) and sixth round (#72-Joe Krakoski) draft choices in the 1961 NFL draft to the Washington Redskins in exchange for LeBaron, convincing him to come out of retirement to become the franchise's first starting quarterback. He started 10 of 12 games in 1960, with rookie Don Meredith and Don Heinrich starting the other two. He also scored the Cowboys' first-ever touchdown in their first exhibition game against the San Francisco 49ers, on August 6 in Seattle. He set a record for the shortest touchdown pass in league history, with his throw to receiver Dick Bielski from the 2-inch line against the Redskins on October 9, 1960.

LeBaron started 10 of 14 games in 1961, with Meredith starting the other four. He only started five games in 1962, splitting time with Meredith. He started the first game of the 1963 season, but was replaced permanently by Meredith for the rest of the season.

He retired at the end of 1963, after playing 12 seasons, throwing for 13,399 yards and 104 touchdowns and being selected for the Pro Bowl four times. He is the shortest quarterback to ever be selected to the Pro Bowl. He was also known as an elusive scrambler and great ball-handler.

== Personal life ==
LeBaron became a football announcer for CBS Sports after his NFL career, and worked as an announcer from 1966 to 1971. He had obtained an LL.B. degree from George Washington University during his off-seasons from football, and practiced law after his football career. He was also the general manager of the Atlanta Falcons from 1977 to 1982 and executive vice president from 1983 through 1985. LeBaron was an avid golfer and continued to play golf in his retirement. He died of natural causes on April 1, 2015.
