= Dave Scott (American football) =

American football player (born 1953)

No. 70
- Positions: Guard, tackle

Personal information
- Born: December 26, 1953 (age 72); Hackensack, New Jersey, U.S.
- Listed height: 6 ft 4 in (1.93 m)
- Listed weight: 276 lb (125 kg)

Career information
- High school: Paterson (Paterson, New Jersey)
- College: Kansas
- NFL draft: 1976: 3rd round, 71st overall pick

Career history
- Atlanta Falcons (1976–1982)

Career NFL statistics
- Games played: 98
- Games started: 76
- Fumble recoveries: 3
- Stats at Pro Football Reference

Arthur David Scott (born December 26, 1953) is an American former professional football player who was an offensive lineman for the Atlanta Falcons of the National Football League (NFL). He played college football for the Kansas Jayhawks.

Raised in Paterson, New Jersey, Scott played prep football at Paterson Central High School.
