= Tony Daykin =

Taiwanese-born American gridiron football player (born 1955)

No. 58, 55
- Position: Linebacker

Personal information
- Born: May 13, 1955 (age 71); Taipei, Taiwan
- Listed height: 6 ft 1 in (1.85 m)
- Listed weight: 215 lb (98 kg)

Career information
- High school: Aquinas (Augusta, Georgia, U.S.)
- College: Georgia Tech
- NFL draft: 1977: 11th round, 293rd overall pick

Career history
- Detroit Lions (1977–1978); Atlanta Falcons (1979–1981)

Career NFL statistics
- Fumble recoveries: 2
- Stats at Pro Football Reference

Tony Daykin (born May 3, 1955) is a Taiwanese-born American former player in the National Football League (NFL). He played for the Detroit Lions and the Atlanta Falcons. He played collegiately for the Georgia Tech football team. He is currently a math teacher and assistant football coach at Carlton J. Kell High School in Marietta, Georgia. He is distinguished as being the first person born in Taiwan to play in the NFL.
