= Ray Strong (gridiron football) =

American football player (born 1956)

No. 25
- Position: Running back

Personal information
- Born: May 7, 1956 (age 70); Berkeley, California, U.S.
- Listed height: 5 ft 9 in (1.75 m)
- Listed weight: 184 lb (83 kg)

Career information
- High school: St. Mary's College
- College: UNLV
- NFL draft: 1978: 10th round, 263rd overall pick

Career history
- Atlanta Falcons (1978–1982); BC Lions (1983)

Career NFL statistics
- Rushing yards: 163
- Rushing average: 3.6
- Touchdowns: 3
- Stats at Pro Football Reference

Raymond Strong (born May 7, 1956) is an American former professional football player who was a running back for the Atlanta Falcons of the National Football League (NFL). He played college football for the UNLV Rebels. He also played professionally in the Canadian Football League (CFL) for the BC Lions.
