= Earl Jones (American football) =

American football player (born 1957)

No. 20
- Position: Cornerback

Personal information
- Born: July 19, 1957 (age 69); Tuscaloosa, Alabama, U.S.
- Listed height: 6 ft 0 in (1.83 m)
- Listed weight: 178 lb (81 kg)

Career information
- High school: Tuscaloosa (AL) Druid
- College: Norfolk State
- NFL draft: 1980: 3rd round, 63rd overall pick

Career history
- Atlanta Falcons (1980-1983)

Career NFL statistics
- Interceptions: 4
- Fumble recoveries: 1
- Stats at Pro Football Reference

Darrel Earl Jones (born July 19, 1957) is an American former professional football player who was a cornerback in the National Football League (NFL). He was selected by the Atlanta Falcons in the third round of the 1980 NFL draft. Jones played college football for the Norfolk State Spartans.
