= Russ Mikeska =

American football player (born 1955)

No. 87
- Position: Tight end

Personal information
- Born: September 10, 1955 (age 71); Temple, Texas, U.S.
- Listed height: 6 ft 3 in (1.91 m)
- Listed weight: 225 lb (102 kg)

Career information
- High school: Temple
- College: Texas A&M
- NFL draft: 1979: undrafted

Career history
- Atlanta Falcons (1979–1982)

Awards and highlights
- Second-team All-SWC (1978)

Career NFL statistics
- Receptions: 6
- Receiving yards: 53
- Stats at Pro Football Reference

Russell E. Mikeska (born September 10, 1955) is an American former professional football player who was a tight end in the National Football League (NFL) for the Atlanta Falcons. He played college football for the Texas A&M Aggies.
