= Bob Glazebrook =

American football player (born 1956)

No. 36
- Position: Safety

Personal information
- Born: March 7, 1956 (age 70); Fresno, California, U.S.
- Listed height: 6 ft 1 in (1.85 m)
- Listed weight: 200 lb (91 kg)

Career information
- High school: Herbert Hoover (Fresno)
- College: Fresno State
- NFL draft: 1978: 11th round, 304th overall pick

Career history
- Atlanta Falcons (1978–1983)

Career NFL statistics
- Interceptions: 8
- Fumble recoveries: 6
- Touchdowns: 1
- Stats at Pro Football Reference

Robert E. Glazebrook (born March 7, 1956) is an American former professional football player who was a safety for six seasons with the Atlanta Falcons of the National Football League (NFL). He played college football for the Fresno State Bulldogs.

He attended Herbert Hoover High School in Fresno, California.
