= Mike Zele =

American football player (born 1956)

No. 63
- Position: Defensive tackle

Personal information
- Born: July 3, 1956 (age 70); Cleveland, Ohio, U.S.
- Listed height: 6 ft 3 in (1.91 m)
- Listed weight: 239 lb (108 kg)

Career information
- High school: St. Joseph (Cleveland)
- College: Kent State
- NFL draft: 1979: 5th round, 127th overall pick

Career history
- Atlanta Falcons (1979–1983)

Career NFL statistics
- Sacks: 4.5
- Fumble recoveries: 4
- Stats at Pro Football Reference

Mike Zele (born July 3, 1956) is an American former professional football player who was a defensive tackle for the Atlanta Falcons of the National Football League (NFL) from 1979 to 1983. He played college football for the Kent State Golden Flashes.
