= Syracuse Football All-Century Team =

The Syracuse Football All-Century Team features the top 44 football players from the 20th century at Syracuse University. The team features a Heisman Trophy winner, nine members of the College Football Hall of Fame, and seven other members of the Pro Football Hall of Fame.

The All-Century Team includes players from eight different decades. The criteria for selecting the team included all players who significantly impacted Syracuse football with special consideration for those who were either members of the Hall of Fame, were named as All-Americans, or who had played in the NFL. Nominees for the ballot were selected by the prominent figures associated with the Syracuse University football program.

Player	Years Lettered
Kevin Abrams	1994-96
Joe Alexander	1916-20
Gary Anderson	1978-81
Jim Brown	1954-56
Gary Bugenhagen	1965-66
Robert Burnett	1987-89
James Collins	1976, 78-80
Danny Conley	1990-94
Larry Csonka	1965-67
Donovin Darius	1994-97
Roger Davis	1957-59
Ernest Davis	1959-61
Joseph Ehrmann	1969-70, 1972
John Flannery	1987-90
Robert Fleck	1951-53
Paul Frase	1984-87
Christopher Gedney	1989-92
Marvin Graves	1990-93
Timothy Green	1982-85
Theodore Gregory	1984-87
Victor Hanson	1924-26
Marvin Harrison	1992-95
Marquis (Bill) Horr	1905-08
Kevin Johnson	1996-98
Daryl Johnston	1985-88
Floyd Little	1964-66
John Mackey	1960-62
Donovan McNabb	1995-98
Don McPherson	1985-87
Kevin Mitchell	1990-93
Art Monk	1976-79
Rob Moore	1987-89
Joseph Morris	1978-81
Thomas Myers	1969-71
Patrick O'Neil	1990-93
Markus Paul	1985-88
Jimmy Ridlon	1954-56
Jim Ringo	1950-52
Walter Sweeney	1960-62
Arthur Thoms	1966-68
Stanley Walters	1970-71
Craig Wolfley	1976-79
Terrence Wooden	1986-89
Robert Yates	1958-59

== See also ==
- Syracuse University
- Syracuse Orange football team
