= Pat Hughes (American football) =

American football player (born 1947)

No. 56, 54
- Positions: Linebacker, center

Personal information
- Born: June 2, 1947 (age 79); Everett, Massachusetts, U.S.
- Listed height: 6 ft 2 in (1.88 m)
- Listed weight: 240 lb (109 kg)

Career information
- High school: Everett
- College: Boston University
- NFL draft: 1970: 9th round, 221st overall pick

Career history
- New York Giants (1970–1976); New Orleans Saints (1977–1979)

Awards and highlights
- Second-team All-East (1969)

Career NFL statistics
- Sacks: 11
- Fumble recoveries: 9
- Interceptions: 15
- Stats at Pro Football Reference

William Patrick Hughes (born June 2, 1947) is an American former professional football player who was a linebacker for 10 seasons in the National Football League (NFL) for the New York Giants and New Orleans Saints. He played college football for the Boston University Terriers.

Hughes was an outstanding high school athlete and was selected by the New York Mets. He originally signed to attend Ohio State but instead was pushed to West Point. In order to gain entrance into West Point he was sent to Valley Forge Military Academy. He left after a few weeks and ended up at Boston University. He captained the BU team in 1969 and, along with Bruce Taylor, led the Terriers to the only Bowl game in their history.

After playing six years with the Giants, Hughes was traded to the New Orleans Saints on April 21, 1977, for a 10th round pick in the 1978 NFL draft.
