= 1995 All-Big East Conference football team =

The 1995 All-Big East Conference football team consists of American football players chosen by various selectors for their All-Big East Conference ("Big East") teams for the 1995 NCAA Division I-A football season. Selectors in 1995 included the Football News (FN).

Six teams placed more than two players on the first team as follows:

- Despite finishing in last place in the conference, Pittsburgh (0–7 record in conference play) led the conference with four players on the All-Big East first team. The Pitt honorees were: wide receiver Dietrich Jells, linebacker Tom Tumulty, placekicker Chris Ferencik, and punter Nate Cochran.
- Conference champion Virginia Tech was ranked No. 10 in the final AP Poll and placed three players on the first team: offensive lineman Bill Conaty and defensive linemen Cornell Brown and J. C. Price.
- Syracuse was ranked No. 19 in the final AP Poll and also placed three players on the first team: quarterback Donovan McNabb, wide receiver Marvin Harrison, and defensive back Kevin Abrams.
- Miami was ranked No. 20 in the final AP Poll and placed three players on the first team: running back Danyell Ferguson, defensive lineman Kenny Holmes, and linebacker Ray Lewis.
- Fourth-place West Virginia also placed three on the first team: linebacker Canute Curtis and defensive backs Torrian Gray and William Yarborough.
- Sixth-place Rutgers also placed three on the first team: running back Terrell Willis, tight end Marco Battaglia, and offensive lineman Pat Cormann.

== Offensive selections ==
=== Quarterbacks ===
- Donovan McNabb, Syracuse (FN)

=== Running backs ===
- Danyell Ferguson, Miami (FN)
- Terrell Willis, Rutgers (FN)

=== Wide receivers ===
- Marvin Harrison, Syracuse (FN)
- Dietrich Jells, Pittsburgh (FN)

=== Tight ends ===
- Marco Battaglia, Rutgers (FN)

=== Offensive linemen ===
- Pat Corman, Rutgers (FN)
- Bill Conaty, Virginia Tech (FN)
- John Summerday, Temple (FN)
- Pete Kendall, Boston College (FN)

== Defensive selections ==
=== Defensive linemen ===
- Cornell Brown, Virginia Tech (FN)
- J. C. Price, Virginia Tech (FN)
- Kenny Holmes, Miami (FN)

=== Linebackers ===
- Ray Lewis, Miami (FN)
- Lance Johnstone, Temple (FN)
- Tom Tumulty, Pittsburgh (FN)
- Canute Curtis, West Virginia (FN)

=== Defensive backs ===
- Kevin Abrams, Syracuse (FN)
- Torrian Gray, Virginia Tech (FN)
- William Yarborough, West Virginia (FN)

== Special teams ==
=== Placekickers ===
- Chris Ferencik, Pittsburgh (FN)

=== Punters ===
- Nate Cochran, Pittsburgh (FN)

== Key ==
FN = Football News
