= Joe Wilson (American football) =

American football player (born 1950)

No. 46, 23
- Position: Running back

Personal information
- Born: August 11, 1950 (age 76); Raeford, North Carolina, U.S.
- Listed height: 5 ft 10 in (1.78 m)
- Listed weight: 210 lb (95 kg)

Career information
- High school: Jamaica Plain (Jamaica Plain, MA)
- College: Holy Cross
- NFL draft: 1973: 8th round, 199th overall pick

Career history
- Cincinnati Bengals (1973); New England Patriots (1974)

Awards and highlights
- 2× Second-team All-East (1971, 1972)

Career NFL statistics
- Rushing attempts: 25
- Rushing yards: 96
- Receptions: 3
- Receiving yards: 38
- Stats at Pro Football Reference

Joseph Wilson (born August 11, 1950) is an American former professional football player who was a running back for two seasons in the National Football League (NFL). He played college football for the Holy Cross Crusaders.

== College career ==
At the College of the Holy Cross, Wilson was a three-year starter at running back for the Crusaders. He left the school as the school's record holder for most rushing yards in a game (274), a single season (973) and for a career (2,350). Wilson became the youngest male athlete and the first African-American athlete to be inducted into the Holy Cross Athletic Hall of Fame in 1978.

== Professional career ==
Wilson was selected in the eighth round of the 1973 NFL draft by the Cincinnati Bengals. He played in 13 games with the team as a rookie, rushing for 39 yards on ten carries and returning eight kickoffs for 173 yards. He was cut by the Bengals before the 1974 season and signed by the New England Patriots. He played in 12 games for the team, rushing 15 times for 57 yards and catching three passes for 38 yards.
