= 1970 All-East football team =

American college football all-star team

The 1970 All-East football team consists of American football players chosen by various selectors as the best players at each position among the Eastern colleges and universities during the 1970 NCAA University Division football season.

== Offense ==
=== Quarterback ===
- Jim Chasey, Dartmouth (AP-1)
- Mike Sherwood, Virginia (UPI-1)
- Frank Harris, Boston College (AP-2)

=== Running backs ===
- Ed Marinaro, Cornell (AP-1, UPI-1)
- Fred Willis, Boston College (AP-1, UPI-1)
- Jim Braxton, West Virginia (AP-1 [tight end], UPI-1)
- Hank Bjorklund, Princeton (AP-2)
- Phil Mosser, William & Mary (AP-2)

=== Ends ===
- Mike Siani, Villanova (AP-1 [wide receiver], UPI-1)
- Joe Albano, Army (AP-1 [wide receiver], UPI-1)
- Jim O'Shea, Boston College (AP-2)
- John Bonistalli, Boston College (AP-2)
- Greg Edmonds, Penn State (AP-2)

=== Tackles ===
- Vic Surma, Penn State (AP-1, UPI-1)
- Bob Donlin, UMass (AP-1)
- Bob Peters, Dartmouth (AP-2; UPI-1)
- Dan Yochum, Syracuse (AP-2)

=== Guards ===
- Bob Holuba, Penn State (AP-1, UPI-1)
- Bill Soucy, Boston University (AP-1)
- Tim Horvath, West Virginia (UPI-1)
- Bill Singletary, Temple (AP-2)
- Brian Houseal, Colgate (AP-2)

=== Center ===
- Bob Herb, William & Mary (AP-1)
- Warren Koegel, Penn State (AP-2; UPI-1)

== Defense ==
=== Ends ===
- Jim Gallagher, Yale (AP-1, UPI-1)
- Jim Kelliher, UMass (AP-1)
- Lou Gubitosa, Syracuse (UPI-1)
- Chris Doyle, Harvard (AP-2)
- Jim Dixon, Boston University (AP-2)

=== Tackles ===
- Joe Ehrmann, Syracuse (AP-1, UPI-1)
- Lloyd Weston, Pittsburgh (AP-1, UPI-1)
- Tom Neville, Yale (AP-2)
- Barry Brink, Dartmouth (AP-2)

=== Guard ===
- Ted Lachowicz, Syracuse (AP-1)
- Rich Lolotai, Yale (AP-2)

=== Linebackers ===
- Jack Ham, Penn State (AP-1, UPI-1)
- Dale Farley, West Virginia (AP-1, UPI-1)
- Gary Farneti, Harvard (AP-1)
- Murry Bowden, Dartmouth (AP-1 [back], UPI-1)
- John Babinecz, Villanova (AP-2)
- Chuck Voith, Navy (AP-2)
- Joe Sabulis, Massachusetts (AP-2)

=== Backs ===
- Mike Smith, Penn State (AP-1, UPI-1)
- Willie Bogan, Dartmouth (AP-1)
- Tom Myers, Syracuse (UPI-1; AP-2)
- George Landis, Penn State (UPI-1; AP-2)
- Bryant Salter, Pittsburgh (UPI-1)
- Larry Clymer, Rutgers (AP-2)

== Key ==
- AP = Associated Press
- UPI = United Press International

== See also ==
- 1970 College Football All-America Team
