= Jim Chasey =

American gridiron football player

No. 12, 8
- Position: Quarterback

Personal information
- Listed height: 6 ft 1 in (1.85 m)
- Listed weight: 185 lb (84 kg)

Career information
- College: Dartmouth

Career history
- 1971–1972: Montreal Alouettes
- 1972: Toronto Argonauts

Awards and highlights
- First-team All-East (1970)

Jim Chasey is an American former professional football quarterback who played two seasons in the Canadian Football League (CFL) with the Montreal Alouettes and Toronto Argonauts. He played college football at Dartmouth College.

== College career ==
Chasey played college football for the Dartmouth Big Green. He helped Dartmouth to a share of the Ivy League championship in 1969 and helped the Big Green to an undefeated season and the Ivy League championship his senior year in 1970. He was also named an "All Ivy" All Star and an "All East" All Star in 1970. Chasey recorded 2,391 yards on 14 passing touchdowns during his college career. He also played baseball for the Dartmouth Big Green in 1969.

== Professional career ==
Chasey signed with the Montreal Alouettes in 1971 and started for them his first season before suffering an injury. He served as backup quarterback in 1972 and was released by the team on August 7, 1972, to make room for quarterback George Mira.

Chasey was signed by the Toronto Argonauts in 1972 and was released by the Argonauts later in the 1972 season.
