= 1972 All-East football team =

American college football all-star team

The 1972 All-East football team consists of American football players chosen by various selectors as the best players at each position among the Eastern colleges and universities during the 1972 NCAA University Division football season.

== Offense ==
=== Quarterback ===
- John Hufnagel, Penn State (AP-1)
- Bernie Galiffa, West Virginia (AP-2)

=== Running backs ===
- Cleveland Cooper, Navy (AP-1)
- Dick Jauron, Yale (AP-1)
- J. J. Jennings, Rutgers (AP-1)
- Mike Esposito, Boston College (AP-2)
- Mark van Eeghen, Colgate (AP-2)
- Joe Wilson, Holy Cross (AP-2)

=== Tight end ===
- Larry Christoff, Rutgers (AP-1)
- Nate Stephens, West Virginia (AP-2)

=== Wide receivers ===
- David Knight, William & Mary (AP-1)
- Danny Buggs, West Virginia (AP-2)

=== Interior linemen ===
- Bill Brown, Princeton (AP-1)
- Dave Lapham, Syracuse (AP-1)
- Bob Norton, Dartmouth (AP-1)
- Bill Singletary, Temple (AP-1)
- Bill Gathright, Boston University (AP-2)
- Carl Schaukowitch, Penn State (AP-2)
- Terry Smith, Columbia (AP-2)
- Ernie Webster, Pittsburgh (AP-2)

=== Center ===
- Gerald Schultze, West Virginia (AP-1)
- Bob Funk, Dartmouth (AP-2)

== Defense ==
=== Ends ===
- Bruce Bannon, Penn State (AP-1)
- Steve Bogosian, Army (AP-1)
- Jim Buckmon, Pittsburgh (AP-2)
- Tom Csatari, Dartmouth (AP-2)

=== Tackles ===
- Carl Barisich, Princeton (AP-1)
- Joe Ehrmann, Syracuse (AP-1)
- Bob Leyen, Yale (AP-2)
- Jeff Yeates, Boston College (AP-2)

=== Linebackers ===
- Bob Lally, Cornell (AP-1)
- Kevin Reilly, Villanova (AP-1)
- John Skorupan, Penn State (AP-1)
- Chuck Boniti, Syracuse (AP-2)
- Doug Jaeger, Dartmouth (AP-2)
- Mike Phillips, Cornell (AP-2)
- Tom Zakowski, West Virginia (AP-2)

=== Defensive backs ===
- Gregg Ducatte, Penn State (AP-1)
- Frank Polito, Villanova (AP-1)
- John Provost, Holy Cross (AP-1)
- Matt Wotell, Army (AP-1)
- Ted Gregory, Columbia (AP-2)
- Brian Herosian, Connecticut (AP-2)
- David Morris, West Virginia (AP-2)
- Paul Scolaro, William & Mary (AP-2)

== Key ==
- AP = Associated Press
- UPI = United Press International

== See also ==
- 1972 College Football All-America Team
