= Don McPherson =

American football player (born 1965)

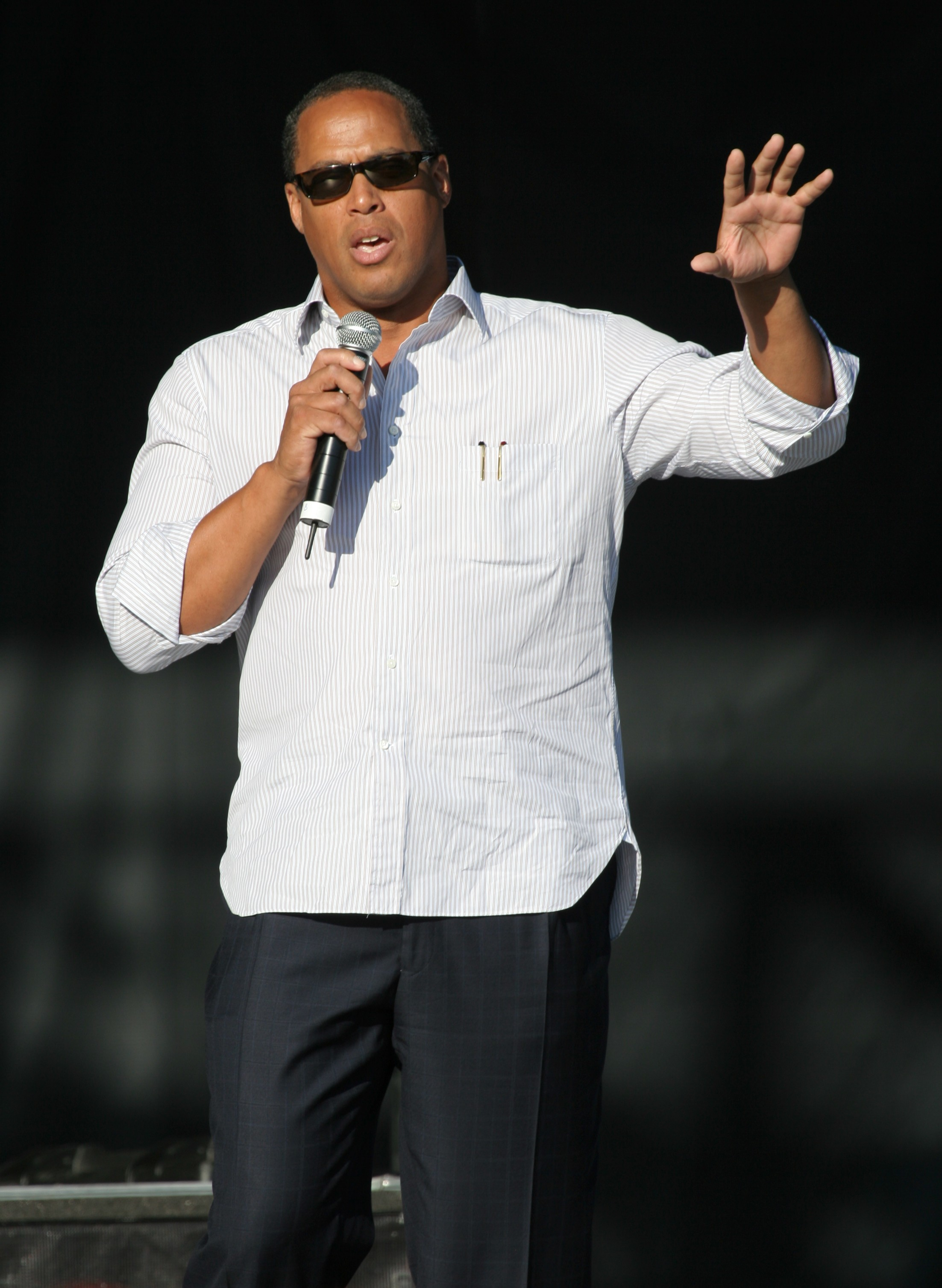
- McPherson in 2009

No. 9, 16
- Position: Quarterback

Personal information
- Born: April 2, 1965 (age 61); Brooklyn, New York, U.S.
- Listed height: 6 ft 1 in (1.85 m)
- Listed weight: 183 lb (83 kg)

Career information
- High school: West Hempstead (West Hempstead, New York)
- College: Syracuse (1983–1987)
- NFL draft: 1988: 6th round, 149th overall pick

Career history
- Philadelphia Eagles (1988–1989); Houston Oilers (1990); Philadelphia Eagles (1991)*; Hamilton Tiger-Cats (1991–1993); Ottawa Rough Riders (1994)
- * Offseason or practice squad member only

Awards and highlights
- Maxwell Award (1987); Davey O'Brien Award (1987); Johnny Unitas Golden Arm Award (1987); Sammy Baugh Trophy (1987); Unanimous All-American (1987); First-team All-East (1987); Second-team All-East (1985); Syracuse Orange No. 9 retired; Syracuse Football All-Century Team

Career CFL statistics
- Passing attempts: 497
- Passing completions: 211
- Completion percentage: 42.5%
- TD–INT: 14–28
- Passing yards: 3,248
- College Football Hall of Fame

Donald G. McPherson (born April 2, 1965) is an American former professional football player who was a quarterback in the National Football League (NFL) and Canadian Football League (CFL). He spent seven seasons in the NFL and CFL with the Philadelphia Eagles, Houston Oilers, Hamilton Tiger-Cats, and Ottawa Rough Riders.

McPherson played college football for the Syracuse Orange, winning the Maxwell Award and the Davey O'Brien Award. He was selected in the sixth round by the Eagles in the 1988 NFL draft. His accomplishments during his tenure with Syracuse propelled him to be inducted into the College Football Hall of Fame in 2008.

== After football ==
McPherson joined the staff of Northeastern University's Center for the Study of Sport in Society, before becoming the first executive director of the Sports Leadership Institute at Adelphi University. As a feminist and social activist he has founded several outreach and mentoring programs, and regularly speaks at college campuses as a critic of gender roles, stating that the standard constructions of masculinity and femininity both limit men's emotions and overall well-being as well as contribute to "gendered violence" such as domestic violence, stalking, and rape. In this capacity he has testified before hearings of the United States House of Representatives.

McPherson is currently a college football commentator for Big East football on regional sports cable network SportsNet New York.

== Personal life ==
He is the younger brother of former NFL player and pastor Miles McPherson.

== See also ==
- List of NCAA major college football yearly passing leaders
