= Jack Ham =

American football player (born 1948)

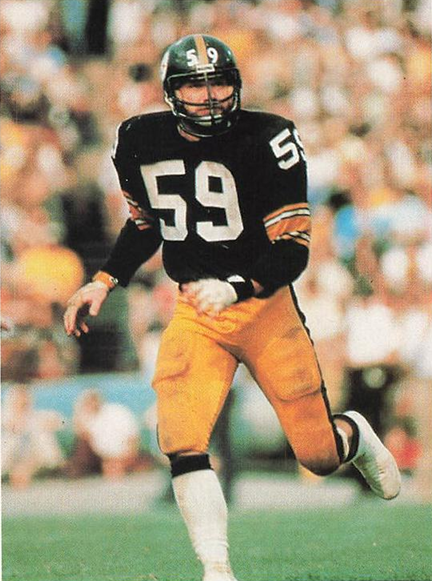
- Ham in 1982 card

No. 59
- Position: Linebacker

Personal information
- Born: December 23, 1948 (age 77); Johnstown, Pennsylvania, U.S.
- Listed height: 6 ft 1 in (1.85 m)
- Listed weight: 225 lb (102 kg)

Career information
- High school: Bishop McCort (Johnstown)
- College: Penn State (1968–1970)
- NFL draft: 1971: 2nd round, 34th overall pick

Career history
- Pittsburgh Steelers (1971–1982)

Awards and highlights
- 4× Super Bowl champion (IX, X, XIII, XIV); 6× First-team All-Pro (1974–1979); 2× Second-team All-Pro (1973, 1980); 8× Pro Bowl (1973–1980); NFL 1970s All-Decade Team; NFL 75th Anniversary All-Time Team; NFL 100th Anniversary All-Time Team; Pittsburgh Steelers All-Time Team; Pittsburgh Steelers Hall of Honor; Consensus All-American (1970); 2× First-team All-East (1969, 1970)

Career NFL statistics
- Interceptions: 32
- Touchdowns: 2
- Stats at Pro Football Reference
- Pro Football Hall of Fame
- College Football Hall of Fame

Jack Raphael Ham Jr. (born December 23, 1948) is an American former professional football player who was a linebacker for the Pittsburgh Steelers of the National Football League (NFL) from 1971 to 1982. He is considered one of the greatest outside linebackers in the history of the NFL. Ham was inducted into the Pro Football Hall of Fame in 1988 and the College Football Hall of Fame in 1990. He played college football for the Penn State Nittany Lions. In mid-2019 the newsletter of the PSU Alumni Association rated Ham first among the 100 greatest athletes, considering all sports and all previous football players, in University history.

== Early life ==
Ham was born and raised in Johnstown, Pennsylvania, where he attended Bishop McCort High School. He continued his education at Massanutten Military Academy in Woodstock, Virginia for a post-graduate season.

== College career ==
Ham played college football at Pennsylvania State University, where he also joined the Phi Delta Theta fraternity. In his three years as a starting linebacker, the Nittany Lions had records of 11–0, 11–0, and 7–3. In his senior year of 1970, Ham was co-captain, recorded 91 tackles alongside four interceptions, and was an All-American. He had 251 career tackles, 143 of them unassisted. He blocked three punts in 1968, setting a school record that was not tied until 1989. He was inducted into the College Football Hall of Fame in 1990.

On December 11, 2014, the Big Ten Network included Ham on "The Mount Rushmore of Penn State Football", as chosen by online fan voting. Ham was joined in the honor by John Cappelletti, LaVar Arrington and Shane Conlan.

== Professional career ==
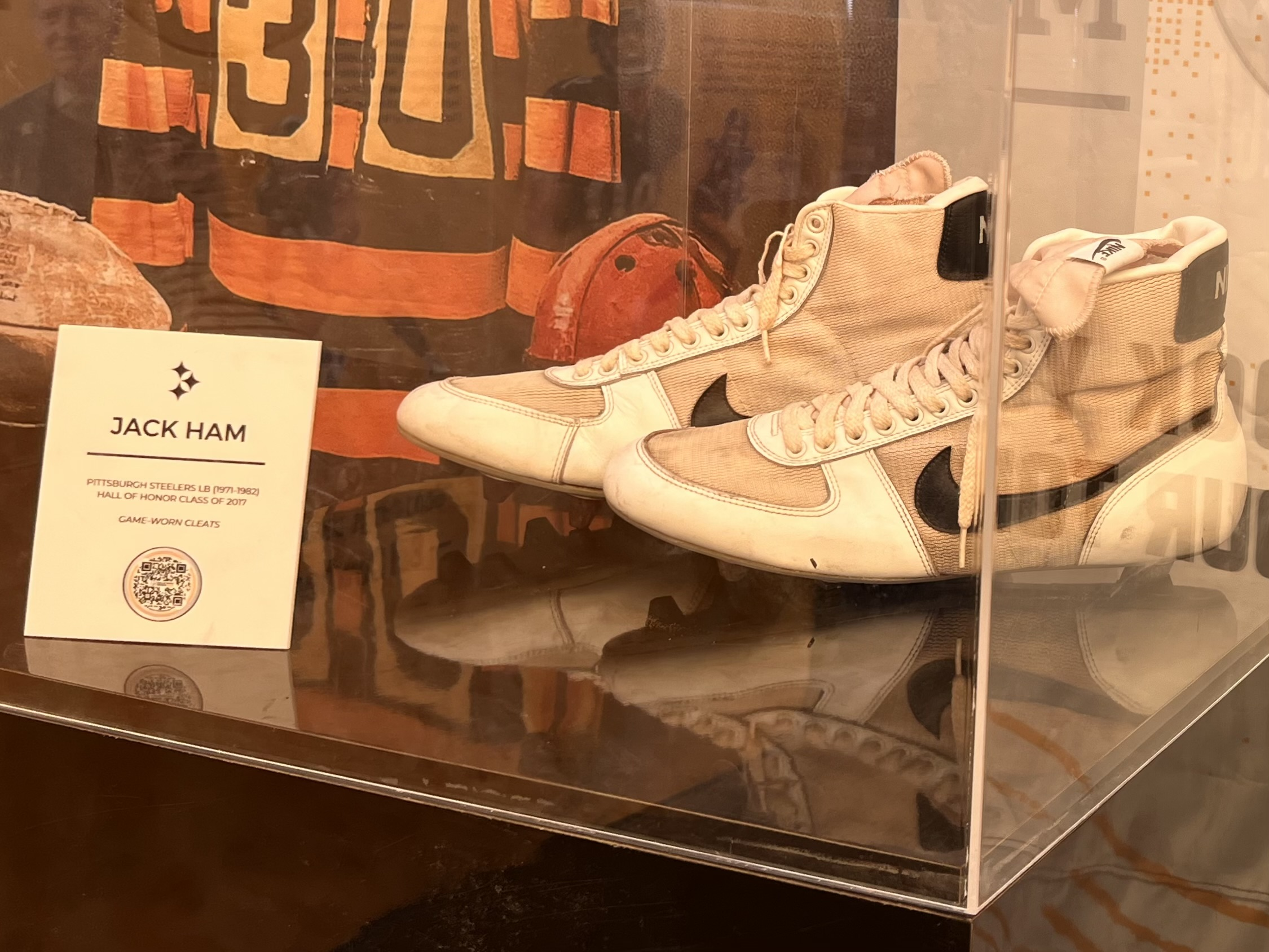
Ham's cleats on display in the Steelers Hall of Honor Museum.

Ham was selected by the Pittsburgh Steelers in the second-round (34th overall) of the 1971 NFL draft. He won the starting left linebacker job as a rookie. He was first-team All-Pro six years and was named to eight straight Pro Bowls. Ham was blessed with tremendous quickness — according to Steelers coach Chuck Noll and teammate Andy Russell he was the "fastest Steeler for the first ten yards, including wide receivers and running backs". He was one of the few outside linebackers who could play pass defense as well as the NFL's top safeties. Although he was a ferocious hitter, he was known as a player who could not be fooled and was seldom out of position. Maxie Baughan, a former NFL linebacker said of Ham, "He was one of the more intelligent players to ever play that position. He was able to diagnose plays. You couldn't ever fool him."

Ham's career statistics include 25 sacks, 21 fumbles recovered, and 32 interceptions (although the sack numbers are unofficial since the NFL did not begin recording sacks until Ham's final year in the league, so he officially has just three sacks). As these numbers indicate, Ham had a flair for the big play, guided by some of the best football instincts ever found in a linebacker. Ham was a member of four Super Bowl winning teams during his 12-year career (although he did not play in Super Bowl XIV due to an ankle injury), all of it spent with the Steelers. His 53 takeaways are the most in NFL history by a non-defensive back, while his 32 interceptions rank him 3rd all time among linebackers, behind Don Shinnick and Stan White.

"Dobre Shunka" (either Polish or Slovak for "good ham") was Ham's nickname while playing, as well as the name of Ham's fan club in the 1970s.

== After retirement ==
After announcing his retirement as an active player on February 17, 1983, Ham began a career as a radio personality. He served as a color commentator for national radio broadcasts of NFL games, and later hosted a show in Pittsburgh with Mark Madden on ESPN Radio 1250 during the NFL season. Ham is currently a sports analyst for Penn State Radio Network and also appears as an analyst on the Westwood One radio network.

Ham is a minority owner of the North American Hockey League's Johnstown Tomahawks. On January 31, 2013, Ham was honored by the Tomahawks' organization with a bobblehead giveaway to the first 1,000 fans who entered the Cambria County War Memorial Arena for the Tomahawks' game against the Port Huron Fighting Falcons.

In 2017, Ham became an advocate of medical marijuana, having studied the benefits of relieving symptoms related to playing football, and wants the NFL to soften their stance on the use of marijuana in general. Ham felt inspired after seeing the cognitive decline of contemporary Nick Buoniconti, as well as other current and former players including former teammate Mike Webster, despite Ham himself being healthy. Ham also believes medical marijuana would help counter the ongoing opioid epidemic affecting society as a whole.

== Honors ==
Ham was inducted into the Pro Football Hall of Fame in 1988 and the College Football Hall of Fame in 1990. In 1999, he was ranked number 47 on The Sporting News' list of the 100 Greatest Football Players.
