= Jeff Yeates =

American football player (born 1951)

No. 62, 79
- Position: Defensive lineman

Personal information
- Born: August 3, 1951 (age 75); Buffalo, New York, U.S.
- Listed height: 6 ft 3 in (1.91 m)
- Listed weight: 248 lb (112 kg)

Career information
- High school: Tonawanda (NY) Cardinal O'Hara
- College: Boston College
- NFL draft: 1973: 4th round, 103rd overall pick

Career history
- Buffalo Bills (1973-1976); Atlanta Falcons (1976-1984)

Awards and highlights
- First-team All-East (1971); Second-team All-East (1972)

Career NFL statistics
- GP / GS: 138 / 84
- Sacks: 7
- FF / FR: 0 / 8
- Interceptions: 1
- Stats at Pro Football Reference

Jeffrey Lee Yeates (born August 3, 1951) is an American former professional football player who was a defensive lineman in the National Football League (NFL). He played college football for the Boston College Eagles. He was selected in the fourth round (103rd overall) of the 1973 NFL draft by the Buffalo Bills.

== Career ==
In 1971 Yeates was named to the UPI All-East all-star team, as well as the AP All-East all-star team.

Yeates was selected in the fourth round (103rd overall) of the 1973 NFL draft by the Buffalo Bills. After appearing in three games for the Bills in 1976, he was waived, and later signed by the Atlanta Falcons. In September 1977, he was waived by the Falcons. In 1978, he became a starter after Claude Humphrey retired. In 1980, when the Falcons switched to a 3-4 defense, Yeates was a starting defensive end alongside Jeff Merrow. He was released by the Falcons in August 1984.
