= Carl Schaukowitch =

American football player (1951–2015)

No. 67
- Position: Guard

Personal information
- Born: February 14, 1951; McKees Rocks, Pennsylvania, U.S.
- Died: October 22, 2015 (aged 64); Mitchellville, Maryland, U.S.
- Listed height: 6 ft 3 in (1.91 m)
- Listed weight: 235 lb (107 kg)

Career information
- High school: McKees Rocks (PA) Sto-Rox
- College: Penn State
- NFL draft: 1973: 15th round, 381st overall pick

Career history
- Denver Broncos (1975-1976)

Awards and highlights
- Second-team All-East (1972)
- Stats at Pro Football Reference

Carl Schaukowitch (February 14, 1951 – October 22, 2015) was an American professional football guard. He played for the Denver Broncos in 1975.

He died on October 22, 2015, in Mitchellville, Maryland at age 64.
