= Murry Bowden =

American football player (born 1949)

Profile
- Position: LB

Personal information
- Born: December 11, 1949 (age 76); Colorado City, Texas, U.S.

Career information
- College: Dartmouth College

Awards and highlights
- First-team All-American (1970); First-team All-East (1970); Second-team All-East (1969)
- College Football Hall of Fame

Murry Bowden (born December 11, 1949) is former American football player. He was elected to the College Football Hall of Fame in 2003. He earned the National Football Foundation Outstanding Contribution to Amateur Football Award in 2018 for his contributions to the construction and management of the Atlanta College Football Hall of Fame.

Bowden graduated cum laude from Dartmouth College with a degree in psychology, and from the University of Texas School of Law. After graduating from Texas, he went on to found the Hanover Company, a real estate investment group.
