= John Babinecz =

American gridiron football player (born 1950)

No. 53, 52
- Position: Linebacker

Personal information
- Born: July 27, 1950 (age 76); Pittsburgh, Pennsylvania, U.S.
- Listed height: 6 ft 1 in (1.85 m)
- Listed weight: 222 lb (101 kg)

Career information
- High school: Central Catholic (Pittsburgh, Pennsylvania)
- College: Villanova
- NFL draft: 1972: 2nd round, 39th overall pick

Career history
- Dallas Cowboys (1972–1974); Houston Oilers (1974); Chicago Bears (1975); Philadelphia Eagles (1976)*; Atlanta Falcons (1976)*; Winnipeg Blue Bombers (1976–1977)
- * Offseason or practice squad member only

Awards and highlights
- First-team All-East (1971); 2× Second-team All-East (1969, 1970)

Career NFL statistics
- Games played: 40
- Stats at Pro Football Reference

John Michael Babinecz (born July 27, 1950) is an American former professional football player who was a linebacker in the National Football League (NFL) for the Dallas Cowboys, Houston Oilers and Chicago Bears. He also was a member of the Winnipeg Blue Bombers in the Canadian Football League (CFL). He played college football at Villanova University.

== Early life ==
Babinecz attended Central Catholic High School where he played as a tight end and linebacker, receiving All-Catholic honors in his last two years. He also was the State Catholic champion in the shot put.

He accepted a football scholarship from Villanova University, where he became a three-year starter and a three-time All-East selection at middle linebacker. In 2003, the school retired his #64 jersey.

== Professional career ==
=== Dallas Cowboys ===
Babinecz was selected by the Dallas Cowboys in the second round (39th overall) of the 1972 NFL draft. As a rookie, he played on special teams in all 14 games.

In 1973, he played on special teams, while backing up Dave Edwards and D. D. Lewis at outside linebacker. He suffered a broken hand during training camp that slowed his progress and also missed 2 regular season games with a pulled back muscle. He was placed on injured waivers (sprained hip and knee) after the first game of the 1974 season.

=== Houston Oilers ===
In 1974, Babinecz was claimed by the Houston Oilers and spent the season on the injured reserve list. He was released on September 14, 1975.

=== Chicago Bears ===
On September 16, 1975, he was claimed by the Chicago Bears. He appeared in 14 games in a reserve role. He wasn't re-signed after the season.

=== Philadelphia Eagles ===
On June 29, 1976, he signed with the Philadelphia Eagles as a free agent. He was waived on August 2.

=== Atlanta Falcons ===
On August 10, 1976, he was claimed off waivers by the Atlanta Falcons. On August 23, he was released before the start of the season.

=== Winnipeg Blue Bombers ===
On September 16, 1976, he signed with the Winnipeg Blue Bombers after a five-day tryout. On August 28, 1977, he was released to be able to enter medical school in September.

== Personal life ==
Babinecz worked as a pediatrician in Paoli, Pennsylvania.
