= Leon Jenkins =

American football player (born 1950)

Profile
- Position: defensive back

Personal information
- Born: August 18, 1950 (age 76); Columbus, Ohio, U.S.

Career information
- College: West Virginia
- NFL draft: 1972: 16th round, 405th overall pick

Career history
- 1972: Detroit Lions

Awards and highlights
- First-team All-East (1971)
- Stats at Pro Football Reference

Leon Jenkins (born August 18, 1950) is a former defensive back in the National Football League (NFL). He played for the Detroit Lions. He was drafted 405th overall in the 16th round of the 1972 NFL draft out of West Virginia.
