= Jack Protz =

American football player (born 1948)

No. 50
- Position: Linebacker

Personal information
- Born: April 14, 1948 (age 78); Jersey City, New Jersey, U.S.
- Listed height: 6 ft 1 in (1.85 m)
- Listed weight: 218 lb (99 kg)

Career information
- High school: Woodbridge (NJ)
- College: North Carolina, Syracuse
- NFL draft: 1970: 11th round, 275th overall pick

Career history
- San Diego Chargers (1970); New York Giants (1972)*
- * Offseason or practice squad member only

Awards and highlights
- Second-team All-East (1969)
- Stats at Pro Football Reference

Jack Protz (born April 14, 1948) is an American former professional football player who was a linebacker for the San Diego Chargers in the National Football League (NFL) in 1970. He played college football for the North Carolina Tar Heels and Syracuse Orange.
