= 1969 All-East football team =

American college football all-star team

The 1969 All-East football team consists of American football players chosen by various selectors as the best players at each position among the Eastern colleges and universities during the 1969 NCAA University Division football season.

The undefeated 1969 Penn State Nittany Lions football team was ranked No. 2 in the final AP and UPI polls and placed eight players on the All-East first team.

== Offense ==
=== Quarterback ===
- Rich Policastro, Rutgers (AP-1)
- Chuck Burkhart, Penn State (AP-2)

=== Running backs ===
- Ed Marinaro, Cornell (AP-1)
- Lynne Moore, Army (AP-1)
- Charlie Pittman, Penn State (AP-1)
- Vince Clements, Connecticut (AP-2)
- Franco Harris, Penn State (AP-2)
- Al Newton, Syracuse (AP-2)

=== Ends ===
- Jim Benedict, Rutgers (AP-1)
- Tony Gabriel, Syracuse (AP-1)
- Pete Blumenthal, Penn (AP-2)
- Tom Boyd, Villanova (AP-2)

=== Tackles ===
- Bob Bouley, Boston College (AP-1)
- John Cherundolo, Syracuse (AP-1)
- Jim Bruen, Brown (AP-2)
- John Ritchie, Dartmouth (AP-2)

=== Guards ===
- Dave Mills, Dartmouth (AP-1)
- Charlie Zapiec, Penn State (AP-1)
- Steve Bogner, Boston University (AP-2)
- Bart Whiteman, Yale (AP-2)

=== Center ===
- Dave Magyar, Pittsburgh (AP-1)
- Mike Pyszczymuka, Columbia (AP-2)

== Defense ==
=== Ends ===
- Jim Gallagher, Yale (AP-1)
- Tim Vigneau, Buffalo (AP-1)
- Ernie Babcock, Dartmouth (AP-2)
- John Hulecki, Massachusetts (AP-2)

=== Tackles ===
- Mike Reid, Penn State (AP-1)
- Steve Smear, Penn State (AP-1)
- Joe Ehrmann, Syracuse (AP-2)
- Bob Hews, Princeton (AP-2)

=== Middle guard ===
- Jim Kates, Penn State (AP-1)
- Ted Lachowicz, Syracuse (AP-2)

=== Linebackers ===
- Dennis Onkotz, Penn State (AP-1)
- Jack Ham, Penn State (AP-1)
- Ralph Cindrich, Pittsburgh (AP-1)
- John Babinecz, Villanova (AP-2)
- Pat Hughes, Boston University (AP-2)
- Jack Protz, Syracuse (AP-2)

=== Backs ===
- Joe Adams, Dartmouth (AP-1)
- Bruce Taylor, Boston University (AP-1)
- Neal Smith, Penn State (AP-1 [safety])
- Murry Bowden, Dartmouth (AP-2)
- Keith Mauney, Princeton (AP-2)
- Tom Myers, Syracuse (AP-2)

== Key ==
- AP = Associated Press
- UPI = United Press International

== See also ==
- 1969 College Football All-America Team
