= 1971 All-East football team =

American college football all-star team

The 1971 All-East football team consists of American football players chosen by various selectors as the best players at each position among the Eastern colleges and universities during the 1971 NCAA University Division football season.

== Offense ==
=== Quarterback ===
- John Hufnagel, Penn State (AP-1, UPI-1)
- Doug Shobert, Temple (AP-2)

=== Running backs ===
- Ed Marinaro, Cornell (AP-1, UPI-1)
- Lydell Mitchell, Penn State (AP-1, UPI-1)
- Hank Bjorklund, Princeton (AP-1)
- Tom Bougus, Boston College (AP-2)
- Franco Harris, Penn State (AP-2)
- Joe Wilson, Holy Cross (AP-2)

=== Tight end ===
- Bob Parsons, Penn State (AP-1, UPI-1)
- Joel Klimek, Pittsburgh (AP-2)

=== Wide receivers ===
- Mike Siani, Villanova (AP-1, UPI-1)
- Don Clune, Penn (UPI-1)
- David Knight, William & Mary (AP-2)

=== Tackles ===
- David Joyner, Penn State (AP-1, UPI-1)
- Joe Leslie, Dartmouth (AP-1, UPI-1)
- Ray Jarosz, Syracuse (AP-2)
- Craig Lambert, Cornell (AP-2)

=== Guards ===
- Bill Singletary, Temple (AP-1, UPI-1)
- B.C. Williams, West Virginia (AP-1, UPI-1)
- Brian Houseal, Colgate (AP-2)
- Jackson Neall, William & Mary (AP-2)

=== Center ===
- Kent Andiorio, Boston College (AP-1)
- Bob Kuziel, Pittsburgh (AP-2, UPI-1)

== Defense ==
=== Ends ===
- Bruce Bannon, Penn State (AP-1, UPI-1)
- Steve Bogosian, Army (AP-1)
- John Roth, Army (AP-2, UPI-1)
- Greg Broskie, Boston College (AP-2)

=== Tackles ===
- Jeff Yeates, Boston College (AP-1, UPI-1)
- Rick Versocki, Boston University (AP-1)
- Ted Lachowicz, Syracuse (UPI-1)
- Bill DeFlavio, Massachusetts (AP-2)
- Jim Pisciottano, Connecticut (AP-2)

=== Linebackers ===
- John Babinecz, Villanova (AP-1, UPI-1)
- Ralph Cindrich, Pittsburgh (AP-1, UPI-1)
- Charlie Zapiec, Penn State (AP-1, UPI-1)
- Paul Kaliades, Columbia (AP-1)
- Gary Gray, Penn State (UPI-1)
- Dan Harper, Holy Cross (AP-2)
- Bob Lally, Cornell (AP-2)
- Sam Picketts, Rutgers (AP-2)
- Chuck Voith, Navy (AP-2)

=== Defensive backs ===
- Tom Myers, Syracuse (AP-1, UPI-1)
- Frank Polito, Villanova (AP-1, UPI-1)
- Dave Ignacio, Harvard (AP-1)
- Leon Jenkins, West Virginia (UPI-1)
- Rich Lee, Temple (AP-2)
- Mel Priester, Boston University (AP-2)
- Matt Wotell, Army (AP-2)

== Key ==
- AP = Associated Press
- UPI = United Press International

== See also ==
- 1971 College Football All-America Team
