= Donovan McNabb =

American football player (born 1976)

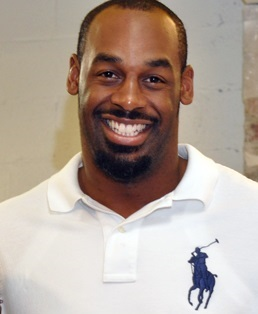
- McNabb in 2010

No. 5
- Position: Quarterback

Personal information
- Born: November 25, 1976 (age 49); Chicago, Illinois, U.S.
- Listed height: 6 ft 2 in (1.88 m)
- Listed weight: 240 lb (109 kg)

Career information
- High school: Mount Carmel (Chicago)
- College: Syracuse (1994–1998)
- NFL draft: 1999: 1st round, 2nd overall pick

Career history
- Philadelphia Eagles (1999–2009); Washington Redskins (2010); Minnesota Vikings (2011)

Awards and highlights
- 6× Pro Bowl (2000–2004, 2009); Philadelphia Eagles 75th Anniversary Team; Philadelphia Eagles Hall of Fame; Philadelphia Eagles No. 5 retired; Philadelphia Sports Hall of Fame; 3× Big East Offensive Player of the Year (1996–1998); Big East Rookie of the Year (1995); 4× First-team All-Big East (1995–1998); Syracuse Football All-Century Team; Syracuse Orange No. 5 retired; NFL record: Most times sacked in a single game: 12 (tied with Warren Moon and Bert Jones)

Career NFL statistics
- Passing attempts: 5,374
- Passing completions: 3,170
- Completion percentage: 59.0%
- TD–INT: 234–117
- Passing yards: 37,276
- Passer rating: 85.6
- Rushing yards: 3,459
- Rushing touchdowns: 29
- Stats at Pro Football Reference

Donovan Jamal McNabb (born November 25, 1976) is an American former professional football quarterback who played in the National Football League (NFL) for 13 seasons, primarily with the Philadelphia Eagles. He played college football for the Syracuse Orange, winning Big East Offensive Player of the Year three times and receiving four first-team All-Big East honors. McNabb was selected second overall in the 1999 NFL draft by the Eagles, where he spent 11 seasons. He also spent a year each with the Washington Redskins and Minnesota Vikings.

As the Eagles' starting quarterback from 1999 to 2009, McNabb led the team to eight playoff appearances, five division titles, five NFC Championship Games (including four consecutive from 2001 to 2004), and one Super Bowl appearance in Super Bowl XXXIX. McNabb ranks ninth in quarterback rushing yards and was the fourth NFL quarterback to amass over 30,000 passing yards, 200 touchdown passes, 3,000 rushing yards, and 20 rushing touchdowns. He is also the Eagles' franchise leader in passing yards, passing touchdowns, attempts, and completions. For his accomplishments in Philadelphia, he was inducted to the Philadelphia Eagles Hall of Fame in 2013.

== Early life ==
McNabb was born and raised in Chicago, Illinois. He attended Mount Carmel High School, where as a sophomore, he was a teammate of future NFL players Simeon Rice and Matt Cushing. Together, they helped Mount Carmel win the 1991 State Championship over Wheaton Central High School. In 1993, as a senior, he led the team to a Chicago Prep Bowl championship. He also excelled at track and field, and played basketball with Antoine Walker.

== College career ==
Though McNabb was approached by recruiters from numerous colleges, only two schools, Syracuse University and the University of Nebraska, offered him scholarships to play college football as a quarterback. He initially leaned toward attending Nebraska, as he relished the idea of being coached by Tom Osborne. Eventually, however, he decided to attend Syracuse and play for the Syracuse Orange football team, principally because he wanted to prove he was a competent "pocket passer", but also for their broadcast journalism program.

After redshirting in 1994, his first year at Syracuse, McNabb went on to start every game during his college career, compiling a 35–14 record. As a freshman, he completed the longest touchdown pass in Syracuse's history—a 96-yard throw against West Virginia University—in a game where he accounted for 354 total yards of offense; he was named the Big East Conference's rookie of the year at the end of the season. McNabb amassed 2,892 yards of total offense in his junior season to set a school record. As a senior, he led Syracuse to a berth in the Orange Bowl against Florida, as he completed 157 of 251 passes (62.5%) for 2,134 yards; he also pushed the eventual champions, the Tennessee Volunteers, to the limit in a very close game. His 22 touchdown passes tied the school's single-season record, set by former Eagle Don McPherson in 1987. McNabb also rushed 135 times for 438 yards and eight touchdowns. He ranked sixth in the nation with a 158.9 passing efficiency rating and 22nd in total offense, with 233.8 yards per game. He tied a school record with four touchdown passes against Cincinnati, and scored five touchdowns against Miami (three rushing and two passing). McNabb was also teammates with future NFL star Marvin Harrison for one season at Syracuse.

McNabb was named the Big East's offensive player of the decade for the 1990s, and Big East Offensive Player of the Year three times from 1996 to 1998, as well as the first-team all-conference vote earner in each of his four seasons. He was a finalist for the 1998 Heisman Trophy. Later, he was named to the Syracuse All-Century football team.

McNabb was also a walk-on for two seasons for the Syracuse basketball team under head coach Jim Boeheim. He spent two years as a reserve on the school's nationally ranked basketball team, including the 1996 squad that lost to Kentucky (a team led by his former high-school teammate Antoine Walker) in the National Championship game.

During his junior year, McNabb hosted Michael Vick when Vick visited Syracuse during a recruiting visit, and the two remained friends afterward.

== Professional career ==
Pre-draft measurables
Height	Weight	Arm length	Hand span	40-yard dash	10-yard split	20-yard split	20-yard shuttle	Three-cone drill	Vertical jump	Broad jump	Wonderlic
6 ft 2 1/4 in (1.89 m)	223 lb (101 kg)	30 3/4 in (0.78 m)	10 in (0.25 m)	4.64 s	1.66 s	2.71 s	4.38 s	7.30 s	33 in (0.84 m)	9 ft 9 in (2.97 m)	14
All values from NFL Combine

=== Philadelphia Eagles ===
==== 1999 ====
McNabb was drafted in the first round as the second overall pick by the Eagles, behind first pick Tim Couch, in the 1999 NFL draft. A group of Eagles fans known as the "Dirty 30" were sent to the draft by sports radio host Angelo Cataldi and Philadelphia Mayor Ed Rendell. The two believed the Eagles would select running back Ricky Williams and they wanted the fans to cheer the selection. However, when the Eagles selected McNabb the "Dirty 30" ended up loudly booing McNabb when he appeared on stage. McNabb was the second of five quarterbacks selected in the first 12 picks of a quarterback-rich class that was at that point considered the best quarterback draft since the famous class of 1983. However, only McNabb and Daunte Culpepper went on to have successful careers in the NFL; Tim Couch struggled with the Cleveland Browns and officially retired in 2007 after being cut by the Jacksonville Jaguars in a failed comeback bid, while Akili Smith and Cade McNown were out of the NFL by 2002. By 2006, only McNabb was still with the team that originally drafted him.

McNabb saw his first NFL regular-season action in the second half against the Tampa Bay Buccaneers in a 19–5 home loss on September 19. He made his first career start at home against Washington on November 14, completing eight of 21 passes for 60 yards in a 35–28 win. He also had nine carries for 49 rushing yards and led the team to a pair of successful two-point conversions (one rush and one pass). He was the first Eagles rookie to start at quarterback since Brad Goebel, and the first Eagles rookie draft pick to start since John Reaves in 1972. With the win, McNabb became the first Eagles rookie quarterback to win his first NFL start since Mike Boryla (December 1, 1974, against Green Bay) and the first Eagle quarterback to win his first start since Ty Detmer (October 13, 1996, against the New York Giants).

McNabb threw the first touchdown pass of his career (six yards to tight end Chad Lewis) against the Indianapolis Colts in a 44–17 home loss on November 21, 1999. McNabb went on to start six of the Eagles' final seven contests (missing the December 19 home game against the New England Patriots, a 24–9 victory, due to injury).

==== 2000–2003: NFC East championship runs ====
In his first full season as an NFL starter in 2000, McNabb finished second in the Associated Press MVP voting (24–11) to St. Louis Rams running back Marshall Faulk, who set the NFL record for most touchdowns scored in a season. McNabb made his primetime debut on ESPN against the Atlanta Falcons at home on October 1, with his first 300-yard passing game in a 38–10 victory and the Eagles' first 300-yard passer since Bobby Hoying against the Cincinnati Bengals at home on November 30, 1997. McNabb's 55 pass attempts at Pittsburgh in a come-from-behind 26–23 overtime victory on November 12 were then a career high and tied for the fourth-highest total in team history. He was named the NFC Offensive Player of the Week after accounting for 90.7% of the offense in a 23–20 victory at Washington on November 26. His 125 rushing yards were the most by an NFL quarterback since the Chicago Bears' Bobby Douglass rushed for 127 on December 17, 1972, and was the eighth-best rushing effort by a quarterback since 1940 when the T formation was introduced. He threw a career-high 390 passing yards and four touchdowns in a 35–24 victory at the Cleveland Browns on December 10 en route to his second NFC Offensive Player of the Week award. McNabb led the Eagles to their first playoff appearance since 1996, where they defeated the favored Tampa Bay Buccaneers 21–3 in the Wild Card Round before losing to the New York Giants 20–10 in the Divisional Round.

McNabb was selected as a first alternate to the NFC Pro Bowl squad in 2000 (behind Daunte Culpepper, Jeff Garcia, and Kurt Warner). When Warner was unable to participate due to injury, McNabb took his spot. He accounted for 74.6% of the team's total net yards in 2000, third highest in the NFL. Only Carolina's Steve Beuerlein (75.3%) and San Francisco's Garcia (75.1%) had a higher percentage. His 629 rushing yards in 2000 led the Eagles, made McNabb only the third quarterback since 1970 to lead his team in rushing, and at the time was the fourth-highest season rushing total by a quarterback (968 by Bobby Douglass in 1972, 942 by Randall Cunningham in 1990, and 674 by Steve McNair in 1997). His six rushing touchdowns in 2000 were the most by an Eagles quarterback since Randall Cunningham, who also had six in 1988. McNabb broke the club's single-season record for most attempts (569) and completions (330) in 2000, marks previously set by Cunningham (560 and 301, respectively) in 1988. He was named 2000 NFC Player of the Year by CBS Radio and the Terry Bradshaw Awards on Fox Sports and was named to the All-Madden team.

In 2001, McNabb led the Eagles to an 11–5 season and fourth-quarter comebacks in two wins against the defending NFC champion New York Giants. At the Meadowlands on October 22, his 18-yard pass to James Thrash with 1:52 remaining gave the Eagles a 10–9 victory, and their first win over the Giants in ten games. He also wiped out a 21–14 deficit on December 30, engineering two fourth-quarter scores as the Eagles clinched their first NFC East title in thirteen years with a 24–21 win. In NFC Divisional Round against the Chicago Bears on January 19, 2002, he was 26-of-40 for 262 yards and two touchdowns passing and adding 37 yards and a touchdown on the ground, which was also the final touchdown at the old Soldier Field. He became only the fourth quarterback in Eagles history to pass for 3,000 yards in consecutive seasons – Sonny Jurgensen (1961–62), Ron Jaworski (1980–81), and Randall Cunningham (1988–90) were the others. McNabb's Eagles advanced to the NFC Championship for the first time since 1980, losing to the heavily favored St. Louis Rams.

McNabb earned his second trip to the Pro Bowl (was originally elected as an alternate) following the 2001 season after combining for 3,715 yards of total offense and establishing career highs in touchdown passes (25) and quarterback rating (84.3). Including the playoffs, he threw touchdown passes in 15 of 18 games and two-or-more in 12 of those games. He was named by his teammates as the club's offensive MVP in 2000 and 2001. During the off-season, McNabb signed a new contract with the Eagles worth $115 million over 12 years, with a $20.5 million signing bonus.

In 2002, McNabb was named NFC Offensive Player of the Month for September, his first time receiving that award. During that month, McNabb led the Eagles to a franchise-record 140 points through four games. In that span, he accounted for 71.5 percent of the club's offensive production, and completed 92 of 150 passes for 1,050 yards and nine touchdowns with three interceptions for a 92.2 passer rating. He also rushed for 141 yards and two touchdowns. In week 11 of the 2002 season, McNabb suffered a broken fibula. On the third play of the game against the Arizona Cardinals, he was sacked by the Cardinals' Adrian Wilson and LeVar Woods. He fumbled the ball, fell to the ground, and held his right leg. He went to the locker room to have his ankle taped, but returned for the Eagles' second drive. McNabb ended the game 20-of-25 passing with 255 yards and four touchdowns, putting him as the NFL's leader in total touchdowns per game where he remained for the rest of the season. McNabb's injury was initially reported to be a sprained ankle, however X-rays after the game revealed that McNabb's fibula was broken, and he was out for the remainder of the regular season. A dominant defense helped A. J. Feeley and Koy Detmer go a combined 5–1 to finish the season. McNabb returned to face the Atlanta Falcons in the Divisional Round of the playoffs, but he recovered slowly. The Eagles defeated the Falcons 20–6, but were upset at home 27–10 by the eventual champion Tampa Bay Buccaneers and their top-ranked defense in the NFC Championship. The Buccaneers' pass defense was so dominant that McNabb's passer rating in the game was poor (58.5), and other opposing quarterbacks fared even worse than McNabb (the respective passer ratings managed against the Buccaneers in the 2002 playoffs by Jeff Garcia and AP NFL MVP Rich Gannon were 35.9 and 48.9).

In late September 2003, McNabb was the subject of very controversial comments made by Rush Limbaugh, who worked as a commentator for ESPN at the time, stating that McNabb was overrated, and that, "I think what we've had here is a little social concern in the NFL. The media has been very desirous that a black quarterback do well". The comments came after the Eagles began the season 0–2, losing to defending Super Bowl champion Buccaneers and eventual champion New England, both losses coming in their newly opened stadium, Lincoln Financial Field. Many responses from commentators, football players, coaches, and other public figures were sharply critical of Limbaugh. Within days ESPN issued a statement that the network communicated to Limbaugh his comments were insensitive and inappropriate, and Limbaugh resigned soon after. In 2005 the so-called "Rush Limbaugh Hypothesis" was tested by a review of more than 10,000 articles published in the 2002 NFL season, and offered no support to Limbaugh's position. The long-term negative social implications of the remarks were revisited in 2021 after Limbaugh's death from lung cancer.

Despite the slow beginning in the 2003 season, McNabb had the highest quarterback rating (97.5) in the NFL for the second half of the season and also completed over 62% of his passes for over eight yards per attempt. McNabb again led his team to the NFC Championship, highlighted by the Eagles' comeback overtime win against the Green Bay Packers in the Divisional Round. The NFL placed this game at #69 on its list of 100 greatest games in the first 100 years of NFL history. McNabb became the first quarterback to rush for more than 100 yards in a postseason game, surpassing the previous NFL record which Otto Graham held for over 50 years. He also completed the critical 4th and 26 pass to Freddie Mitchell during the game-tying drive at the end of regulation. Later analysis published in 2012 by Advanced Football Analytics and the Journal of Quantitative Analysis in Sports determined that the Eagles' odds of tying the score under those conditions was "a whopping 1 out of 175." The 2003 NFC Championship ended in disappointment with Philadelphia's 14–3 home loss to the underdog Carolina Panthers in the NFC Championship. McNabb was injured with separated rib cartilage in the second quarter, when a sack by Panthers' defensive end Mike Rucker was worsened by linebacker Greg Favors tackling McNabb on the ground, because Favors was unsure if the play was over. McNabb sat out for one play before returning to the game. McNabb attempted to play through the injury but was much less effective afterward, completing only four of his next 12 passes including three interceptions, leaving the game for Koy Detmer to play the fourth quarter.

With this defeat, McNabb became the third quarterback (after Ken Stabler and Danny White) to lead a team to defeats in three consecutive conference title games. McNabb's cumulative passer rating in the three games was only 50.5, and some assumed this was simply because McNabb "choked" in big games.

==== 2004: Super Bowl XXXIX ====
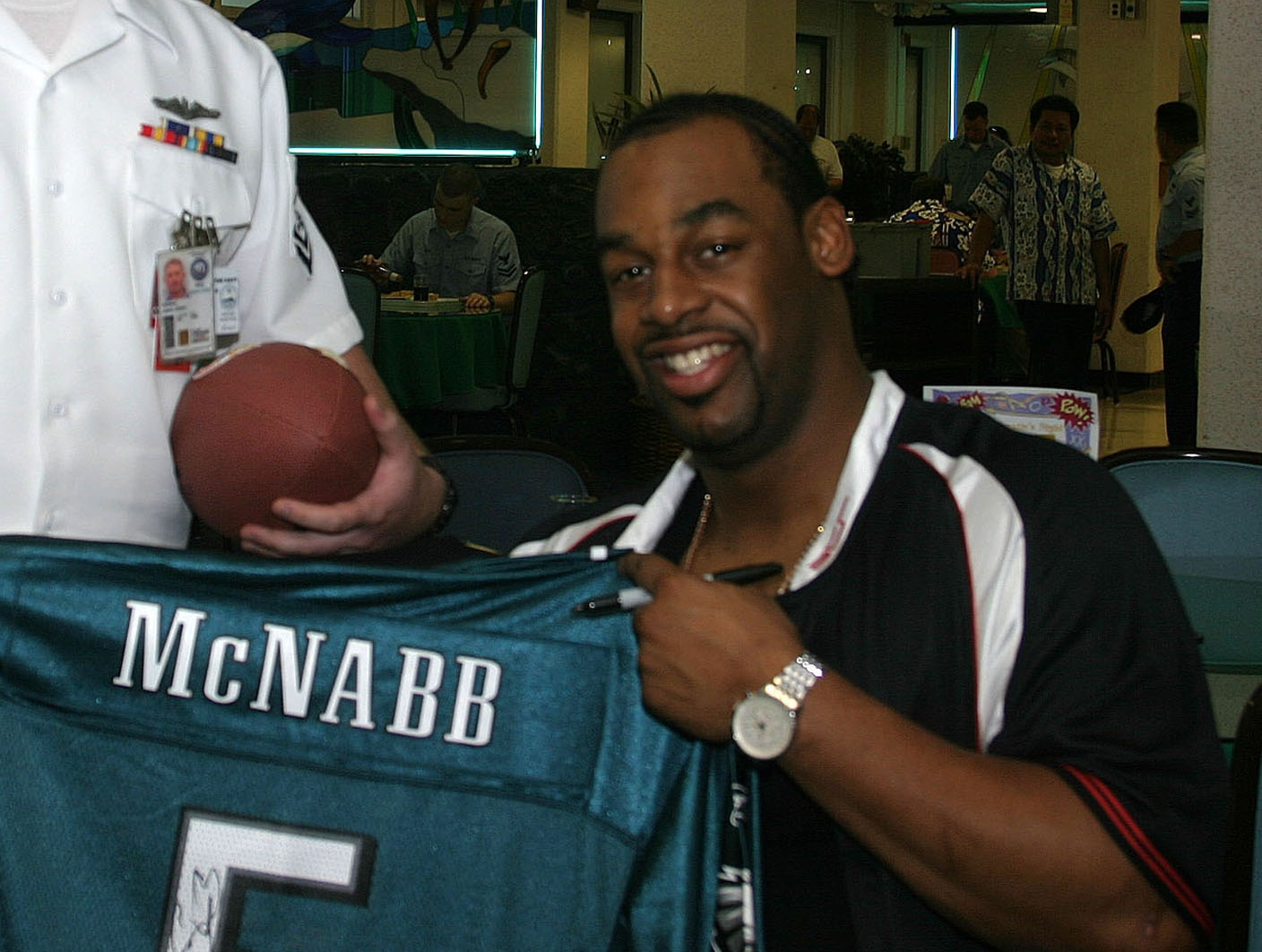
McNabb in 2004, during his tenure with the Eagles

McNabb finally amassed the kind of numbers that placed him firmly as one of the elite NFL quarterbacks statistically. He averaged 8.26 yards per attempt, completed 64.0% of his passes, threw 31 touchdown passes (he also ran for three more), and had only eight interceptions. These numbers translated to a season passer rating of 104.7, which not only set an Eagles franchise record, but was also 2nd in the NFC for 2004, surpassed the season-leading passer ratings of the NFL's most recent seasons at that time (2000–2003, and also 2005–2006), and tied Steve Young for the fifteenth-highest single season passer rating up to that point in NFL history. Further, he became the first quarterback in league history to throw over 30 touchdowns and fewer than 10 interceptions in a single season, and set a new NFL single season record with 20 completions over 40 yards. This dramatic improvement coincided with a massive upgrading of the Eagles' receiving corps, namely the arrival of Terrell Owens, who caught 77 passes for 1,200 yards and 14 touchdowns in only 14 games. Owens was the team's first Pro Bowl-caliber wide receiver since before Coach Reid was hired (Irving Fryar, 1997) and the team's first All-Pro wide receiver in almost 20 years (Mike Quick, 1985). As a result, the Eagles won their first seven games of the season for the first time in franchise history, clinched first place in their division with five weeks still to play in the regular season, and won the NFC East by a record-tying seven-game margin in posting a 13–3 record, the franchise's best 16-game season ever. McNabb ended the season 1 TD short of tying the Eagles' single season records for passing TDs and total TDs, in large part because he only played sparingly in the team's fifteenth game (attempting and completing three passes, with 1 TD), and the team rested McNabb for the season finale.

McNabb had arguably his most productive game of the season in a week-13 game against the Super Bowl-contending Green Bay Packers. After starting the game completing his first 14 passes (setting an NFL record with 24 consecutive passes completed over a two-game span), he led the Eagles to a 47–17 blowout victory. McNabb passed for an Eagles' then-record 464 yards and five touchdowns (all five in the first half), a 74.4% completion percentage, and a 147.8 passer rating. McNabb's performance was only the second game in NFL history with a quarterback passing for more than 450 yards, 5 TDs, and no interceptions, the first being Y.A. Tittle in 1962.

In the playoffs, McNabb led the Eagles to their second Super Bowl appearance in franchise history, with victories over the Minnesota Vikings 27–14 in the Divisional Round and Atlanta Falcons 27–10 in the NFC Championship. McNabb completed 65.4% of his passes in the NFC championship for 180 yards, two touchdowns, no interceptions, 32 yards rushing, and a passer rating of 111.1. Owens did not play during the two playoff victories as he was recovering from a severely sprained ankle and injured ligament that occurred during a game against the Cowboys in week 15. McNabb became only the third African-American quarterback to start in a Super Bowl after Doug Williams in 1987 and Steve McNair in 1999.

McNabb led the Eagles against the New England Patriots in Super Bowl XXXIX. McNabb struggled at times as the Patriots' defense implemented a plan to stifle the Eagles' running attack and contain McNabb's mobility. The Patriots' plan mostly succeeded, limiting the Eagles to only 45 yards rushing for the game and zero rushing yards for McNabb. Almost half of those yards were gained on a 22-yard run by Brian Westbrook as time expired at the end of the first half, and the Eagles ballcarriers averaged less than 1.5 yards per rush (23 yards on 16 carries) during the rest of the game. The Eagles' receiving corps was also depleted, as tight end Chad Lewis missed the game due to injury, and wide receiver Todd Pinkston was forced to leave the game due to dehydration after leading the Eagles' receivers in the first half with four receptions for 82 yards. The Patriots sacked McNabb four times, and McNabb threw three crucial interceptions (two of which were in New England territory, and one of those was inside the 20-yard line). The last was intercepted off a deflected pass thrown by McNabb from the Eagles' own end zone with just 12 seconds remaining in the game. Some controversy followed the game, with rumors circulating that McNabb became ill and threw up in the huddle during the Eagles' last touchdown drive late in the fourth quarter. McNabb denied the rumor and accepted blame for the defeat. The rumor persisted even though no Eagles player could confirm seeing McNabb become ill, and even though none of the extensive television coverage recorded such an incident. Philadelphia Inquirer and Bleacher Report later described the rumor as only a "myth" and an "NFL urban legend." McNabb accounted for almost 90% of the Eagles' yards from scrimmage with 30 completions for 357 yards, the third-highest total for both categories in Super Bowl history, and three touchdowns, the only points in the game for Philadelphia. Despite McNabb's efforts, the Eagles lost by a score of 24–21.

For his 2004 efforts, McNabb was selected to his fifth consecutive Pro Bowl, was named the NFC Player of the Year by CBS Radio and also by the DC Touchdown Club, and was named as the 101 Awards NFC Offensive Player of the Year.

==== 2005–2007: Injuries ====
McNabb's 2005 season began in turmoil and ended on the injured reserve list. While not speaking to his main target, Terrell Owens (who was temporarily barred from the Eagles' training camp for insubordination, and would be suspended by the Eagles before season's end), and all the distractions that came with Owens' ongoing conflicts with the team, McNabb performed well in September despite a painful sports hernia and was named the NFC's Offensive Player of the Month for the fourth time. McNabb threw 964 yards, eight touchdowns, and only two interceptions in three games, leading the Eagles to a 2–1 record. McNabb carried that momentum into October as he went 33-for-48 (68.8% completions), and threw 369 yards and three touchdowns en route to leading the Eagles to a memorable come-from-behind victory at an unfriendly Arrowhead Stadium against the Kansas City Chiefs 37–31. McNabb also nearly set an NFL record as he completed 25 consecutive passes in a single game against the San Diego Chargers on October 23, 2005, but this record is not counted by the NFL as the completions were interrupted by a spiking of the ball to stop the clock at the end of the first half. The 2005 game was also noteworthy for Coach Reid calling for McNabb to have 25 pass attempts in a row, without interruption by a running play.

McNabb and Owens, to their credit, did not appear to allow the off-the-field controversies to affect their play on the field: through week 7 McNabb led the NFL in passing yards, was tied for most passing touchdowns, and targeted Owens an average of 13.14 times per game (most in the NFL since 1999 when receiver "targets" were first tracked, and a still-current record as of 2023), with Owens second only to Panthers WR Steve Smith Sr. in receiving touchdowns, receptions, and receiving yards at that point in 2005.

McNabb could not keep the team's momentum rolling, as the Eagles lost four straight games. Over that span, McNabb posted a passer rating higher than 72 only once, on November 6, at the Washington Redskins. After playing the season with a sports hernia and sore thumb, McNabb's season ended with an injury on November 14 on Monday night during a 21–20 loss to the rival Dallas Cowboys. McNabb was intercepted by Roy Williams towards the end of the game, and tried to tackle the defender when Scott Shanle came in and tackled McNabb to the ground. McNabb's groin was injured on the play and he was placed on the injured-reserve list later that week. Mike McMahon replaced him at quarterback, and went 2–5 as a starter, with the Eagles finishing the season with a 6–10 record overall. Though low for his standards, McNabb put up respectable numbers in 2005. In nine games, he threw 2,507 yards, 16 touchdowns, and nine interceptions. To go along with that, he completed 59.1% (211–357) of his passes and was the NFL's leader in total offense per game at the season's end.

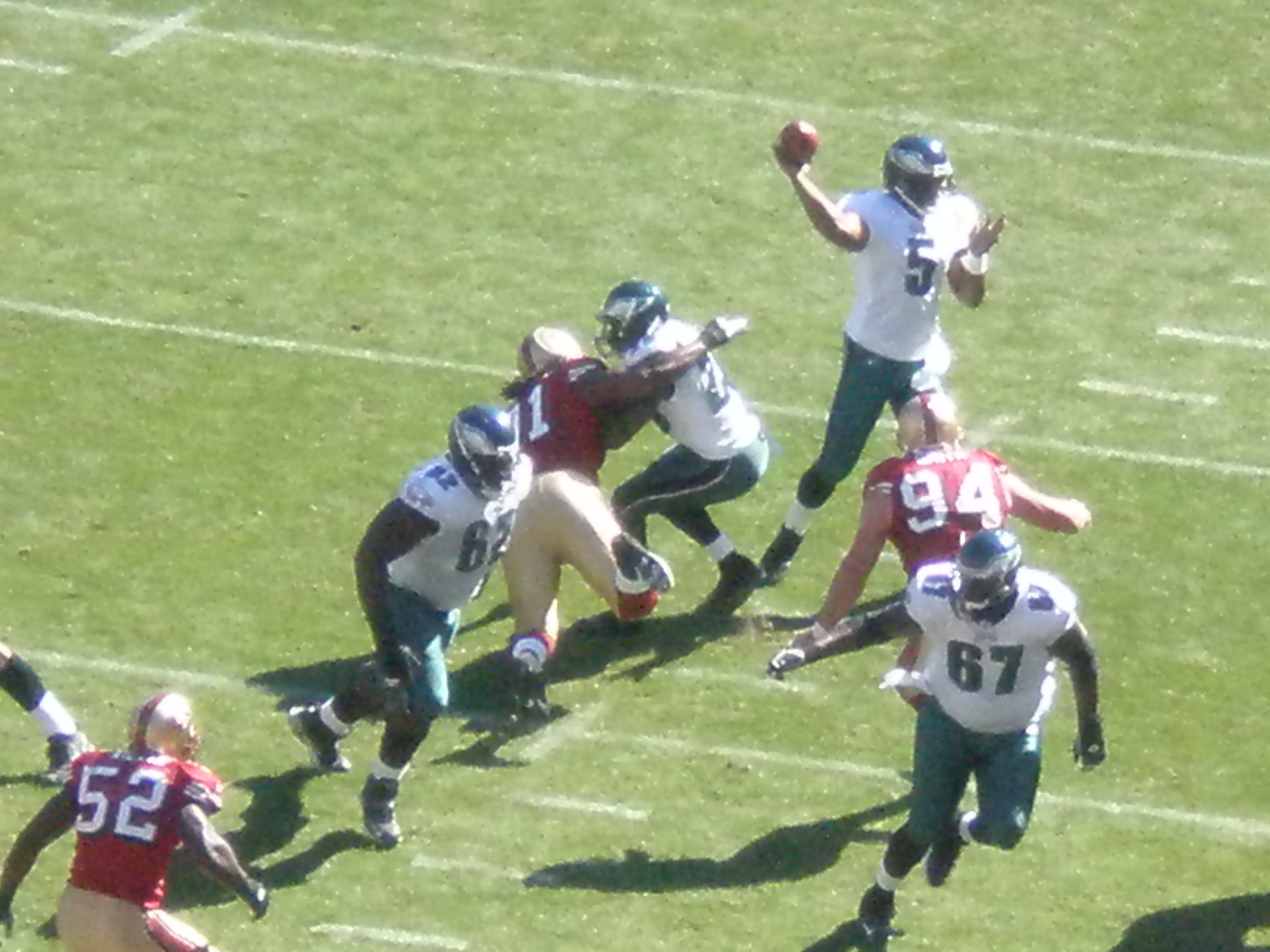
McNabb throws a pass in a win against the San Francisco 49ers, October 12, 2008

McNabb and the Eagles began the 2006 season with a fast start to 4–1, at that time leading the NFL in six offensive categories with McNabb becoming the first NFL quarterback to start a season with at least 1,500 yards passing, 10-plus TDs, and no more than one interception through his first five games. The Eagles began to lose momentum, stumbling to 5–4 heading into a week-11 game against the Tennessee Titans on November 19. At that time McNabb led the NFL in total offense per game, touchdown percentage, and yards per completion (also finishing the season as the NFL's leader in those three categories), and was among the NFL's top 3 quarterbacks for lowest interception percentage and highest TD-INT ratio. However, during the game, McNabb tore the anterior cruciate ligament (ACL) and meniscus in his right knee while jumping out of bounds, ending his season, the third time in five years McNabb had gone down with six or more games remaining in the regular season. Eagles officials stated that his rehabilitation would likely last 8–12 months, which completely ended his 2006 season and even raised questions as to whether he would be ready to begin playing by the beginning of the 2007 season. In the meantime, veteran backup quarterback Jeff Garcia took McNabb's place as the Eagles' starting quarterback. Garcia had success, leading the Eagles from 5–5 after the Tennessee game to 10–6 and winners of the NFC East Division. The Eagles went on to win their home playoff game in the Wild Card Round of the playoffs against the New York Giants, 23–20, with Garcia under center. However, in the following Divisional Round, they were defeated by the New Orleans Saints in the Superdome, 27–24.

Having played nearly up to full speed in the preseason games, it was decided that McNabb would return to the field several months short of the full year-long recovery expected of an ACL injury. In the season opener against the Green Bay Packers, the Eagles and McNabb suffered a 16–13 loss. McNabb had his share of problems, completing less than half of his passes for 184 yards and one touchdown. The Eagles lost their first home game of the season to the rival Washington Redskins, 20–12, though his numbers improved. As week 3 approached, skeptics had already wondered whether McNabb still had the skill that propelled him to success in the past. The Eagles defeated the Detroit Lions in a 56–21 win in week 3. McNabb completed 21 of his 26 attempted passes for 381 yards. Four of those passes went for touchdowns (three of them went to Kevin Curtis), all in the first half. He was 14 of 15 for 332 yards in the first half. His performance against the Lions was highlighted by his first perfect (158.3) quarterback rating game. However, week 4 did not prove to be as good as the Eagles thought it would be. The Eagles endured yet another loss, this time to the New York Giants. The Giants' defense, led by defensive end Osi Umenyiora, sacked McNabb a record-tying 12 times. McNabb completed 15 of 31 attempted passes for 138 yards and no touchdowns. The Eagles split their next four games. In Week 10, in the Eagles' second divisional game against Washington, McNabb passed for four touchdowns in the 33–25 victory. In the following game, against the Miami Dolphins, McNabb injured his right ankle and missed the next two games. He finished the 2007 season with 3,324 passing yards, 19 passing touchdowns, and seven interceptions in 14 games.

During a win against the Cowboys, sideline reporter Pam Oliver reported during the game that McNabb indicated that he did not expect to be back in Philadelphia for the 2008 season. McNabb later indicated that this was not true, and stated that although he believed rookie Kevin Kolb's time would come, he would be an Eagle the next season.

==== 2008 ====
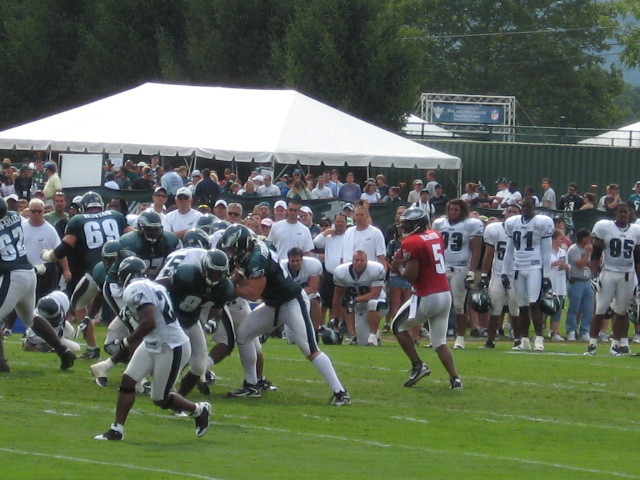
McNabb drops back to pass during Eagles' training camp in Bethlehem, Pennsylvania, in August 2008

At the conclusion of the 2007 season, McNabb faced criticism for asking for "playmakers" on his yardbarker blog. He did, however, deny he was taking a shot at anyone in particular, saying "We were 8–8. There is room for improvement."

McNabb caused another mild stir in camp when he suggested that the Eagles should not have lost a game to any of their NFC East opponents the previous season. He felt that they were just a few plays away from being a playoff team. He even went on to say, "I still put us at the top of the NFC." In week 1 of the 2008 NFL season, McNabb threw for 361 yards (the most of any quarterback that week) and three touchdowns, which included a 90-yard toss to Hank Baskett at the end of the second quarter. This performance led to him receiving the FedEx Air Player of the Week award. In week 3 against the Pittsburgh Steelers, McNabb threw his 176th career touchdown, passing Ron Jaworski and becoming the Eagles' all-time touchdown-pass leader.

McNabb set a career high with 58 passing attempts (completing 28), and tied a career high with three interceptions in the NFL's first tie game in six years, when the Eagles faced the Cincinnati Bengals and ended up with a 13–13 tie. McNabb later admitted that he was not aware that an NFL regular-season game could end in a tie, leading to controversy because this could have affected game strategy. After the game, he stated "I never even knew that was in the rulebook. It's part of the rules, and we have to go with it. I was looking forward to the next opportunity to get out there and try to win the game. I hate to see what happens in the Super Bowl, and I hate to see what happens in the playoffs, to settle with a tie."

After the tie, McNabb struggled in a game against the Baltimore Ravens, going 8-of-18 for 54 yards with two interceptions and a fumble, and being sacked twice. In the second half, Andy Reid decided to go with Kevin Kolb, who was in his second year in the league. This was McNabb's first time being benched for something other than injury or a meaningless game. In the game, Kolb threw an interception that was returned 108 yards for a touchdown by safety Ed Reed, breaking Reed's own previous record.

Despite his up-and-down season, McNabb helped the Eagles reach the playoffs for the seventh time in his nine seasons as a starter. He also set a career high with 3,916 yards passing, led the Eagles to a franchise-record 416 points, and set a new NFL record for lowest career interception percentage, 2.09%, breaking the previous record of 2.11% set by Neil O'Donnell in 1995. At that time, McNabb's career touchdown-to-interception ratio was third-best in league history (2.16), behind only Tom Brady (2.29) and Steve Young (2.17).

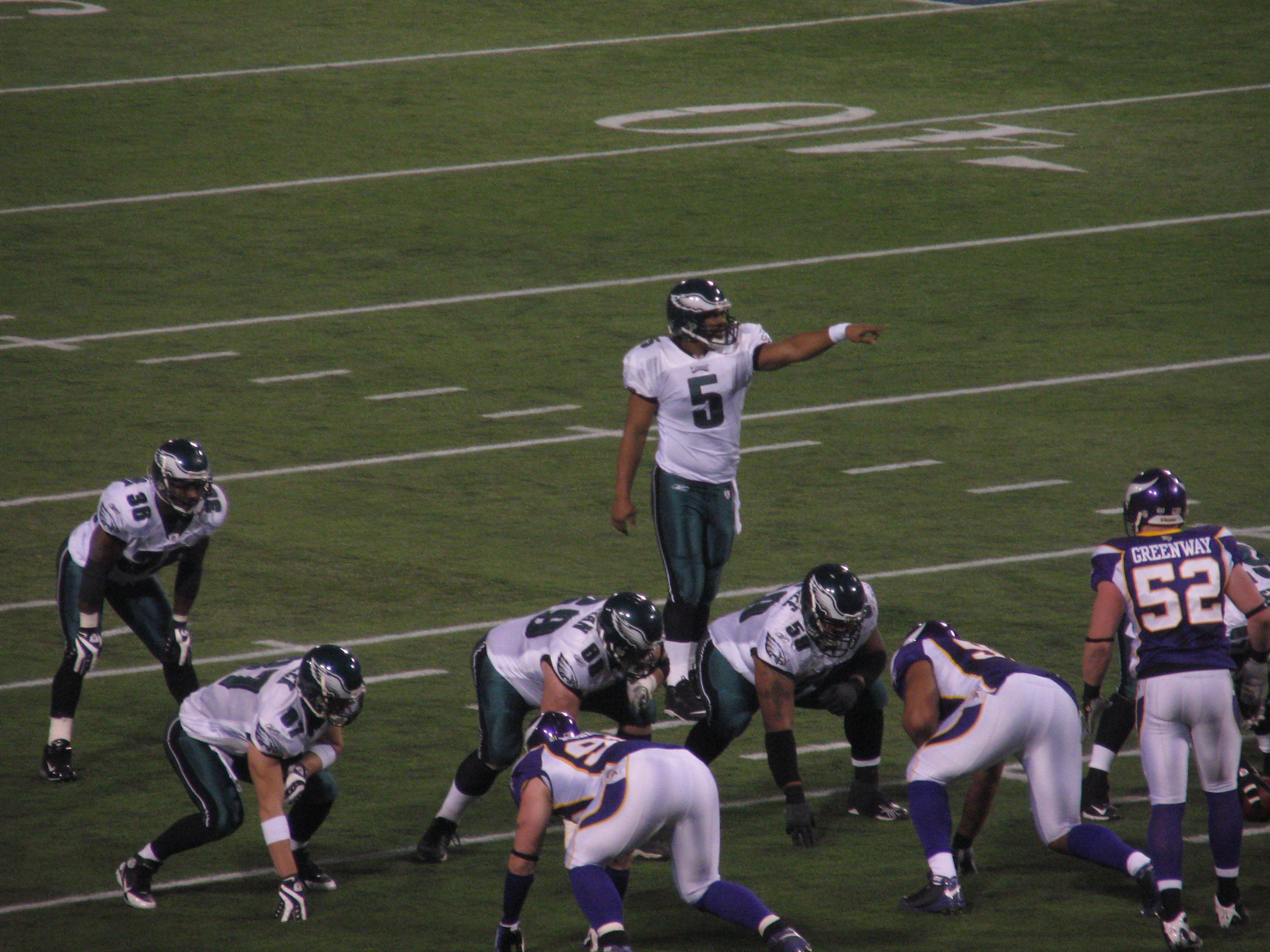
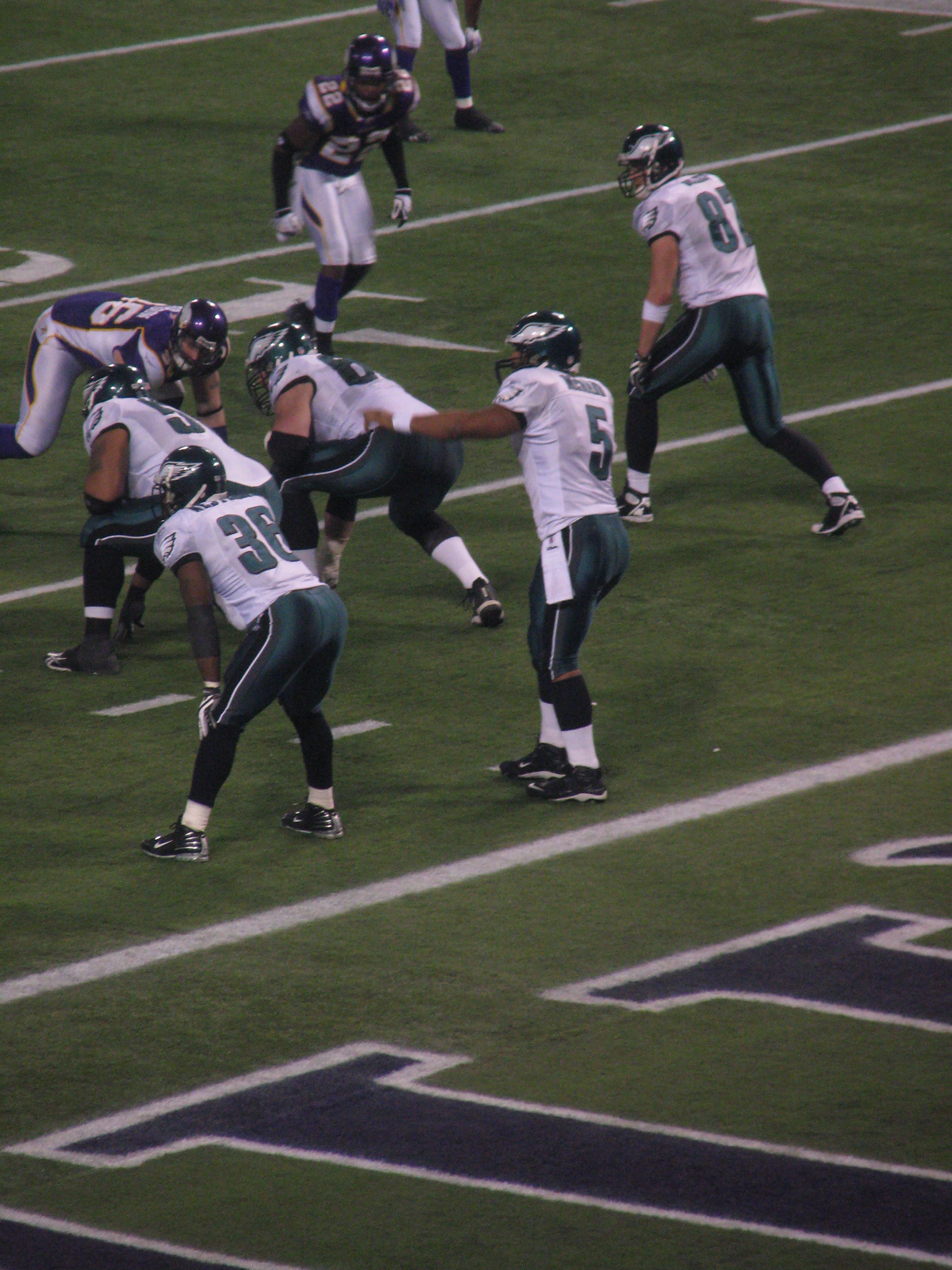
McNabb audibles during the 2008 NFC Wild Card Game

In the Wild Card Round, McNabb threw 300 yards, including a 71-yard touchdown to Brian Westbrook, to lead Philadelphia to a 26–14 win on the road over the Minnesota Vikings.

On January 11, 2009, McNabb and the Eagles upset the defending champions, the New York Giants, on the road in the Divisional Round of the playoffs. The Eagles won 23–11 and advanced to the NFC Championship against the Arizona Cardinals. The Eagles defeated the Cardinals earlier in the season but recognized them as a dangerous opponent, in part because the Cardinals were only the third team in NFL history with a trio of 1,000-yard wide receivers from the regular season. The Eagles traveled to Arizona for their third straight road game, hoping to become only the fourth wild card team since 1970 to win three consecutive road games to play in the Super Bowl. The Eagles trailed 24–6 at halftime, but stormed back in the second half to take a 25–24 lead in the fourth quarter. However, the Cardinals retook the lead with a late touchdown and prevailed 32–25 in McNabb's last appearance in a conference championship game. McNabb was 28 for 47 for 375 yards passing (388 yards of total offense), three touchdowns, an interception, and a passer rating of 97.4. McNabb's 388 yards of total offense were the third-most by a quarterback in any conference championship game up to that point in time (NFC or AFC), and the most up to that point in the history of the NFC championship game.

==== 2009 ====
In the 2009 NFL draft, the Eagles picked Missouri Tigers star wide receiver Jeremy Maclin to add to McNabb's receiving corps, with Kevin Curtis and DeSean Jackson. While Curtis only caught 77 yards, Maclin had 773 yards and four touchdowns in a respectable rookie season, and Jackson was selected to the Pro Bowl after his first 1,000-yard season. Jackson's selection was only the second time that an Eagles wide receiver was named to the Pro Bowl during McNabb's years with the team. Another reliable target for McNabb was the new starting tight end Brent Celek, with whom he connected 76 times for 971 yards and eight touchdowns.

McNabb also encouraged the Eagles to sign quarterback Michael Vick to the team as a backup upon his release from prison for his part in a criminal dog fighting operation. McNabb had hosted and befriended Vick years before during Vick's recruiting visit to Syracuse University, stated that he was excited that the Eagles gave Vick an opportunity to get his life back on track, and The New York Times described McNabb's role in Vick's signing as "an act of selflessness not often seen among professional athletes."

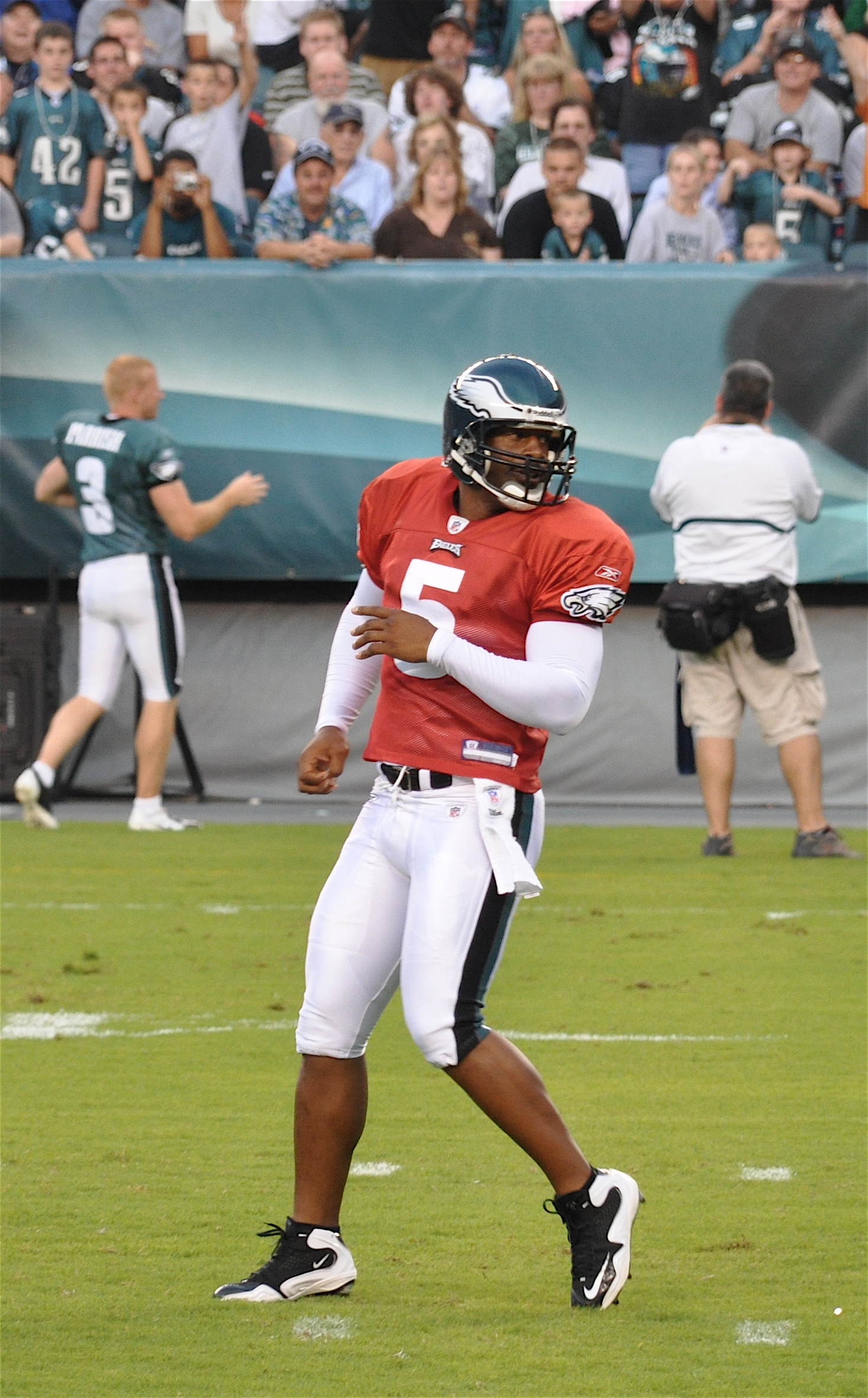
McNabb playing a scrimmage with the Eagles, August 2009

In the season opener, McNabb led the Eagles to a 38–10 win over the Carolina Panthers. He completed 10 of his 18 passes for a total of 79 yards and two touchdowns. However, Andy Reid said the following Monday that McNabb broke a rib while rushing for a touchdown in the third quarter. The Eagles were hopeful McNabb would start in the week-2 game against the New Orleans Saints, but he was kept on the sidelines in both weeks 2 and 3. Kevin Kolb replaced him, and the Eagles lost to the Saints, but beat the Kansas City Chiefs the next week. Following the Eagles bye week in week 4, McNabb returned in the week-5 game against the Tampa Bay Buccaneers, completing 16 of his 21 attempts for 264 yards and three touchdowns and being responsible for 210 of the 219 yards that the Eagles offense managed in total in the first half.

McNabb reached 200 career touchdowns and 30,000 career yards passed in a win against the Washington Redskins on October 26, 2009, with a 45-yard touchdown pass to DeSean Jackson.

Philadelphia met the Dallas Cowboys in week 17 with the winner becoming the NFC East champions. The Eagles previously lost to the Cowboys in week 9, and then lost the season finale in a 24–0 shutout, setting up a rematch the following week in Dallas in the Wild Card Round of the playoffs.

The Wild Card Round rematch with Dallas proved to be just as disastrous for the Eagles as the season finale. McNabb struggled early and was unable to get the offense into a rhythm, and after a scoreless first period the Cowboys outscored the Eagles 27–7 in the second quarter. Philadelphia fell 34–14 to Dallas, marking the first time McNabb and the Eagles were winless in a playoff appearance.

McNabb faced speculation about his future with the Eagles, with some considering his possible trade value if the team began a transition at quarterback from McNabb to backup and former second round draft pick Kevin Kolb. McNabb earned Pro Bowl honors for the sixth and last time in his career, with the 2009 season being statistically one of his most productive seasons. NFL.com noted in the offseason that McNabb finished the 2000s as one of the decade's top quarterbacks in several offensive categories even though the Eagles' most productive receiving target - by a "stunning" margin - was a running back (Brian Westbrook), followed next by two tight ends (L.J. Smith and Chad Lewis), and credited McNabb for having done much "with so little." In 2023, others reached similar conclusions, crediting McNabb for much "heavy lifting" during his years with the Eagles, noting that none of the team's three most productive wide receivers of the McNabb years - Todd Pinkston, James Thrash, and Reggie Brown - had any 1,000-yard receiving seasons among them.

=== Washington Redskins ===
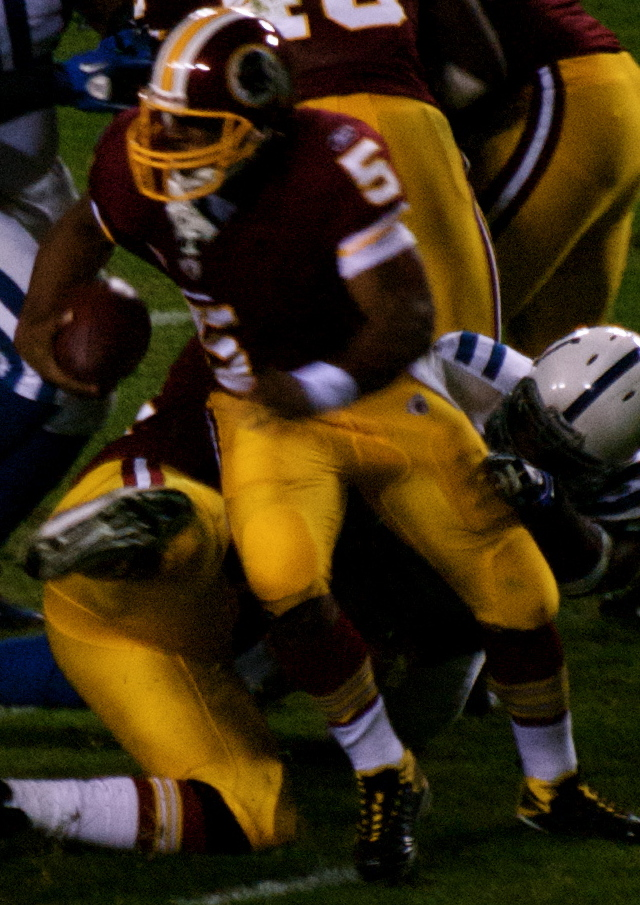
McNabb with the Redskins in 2010

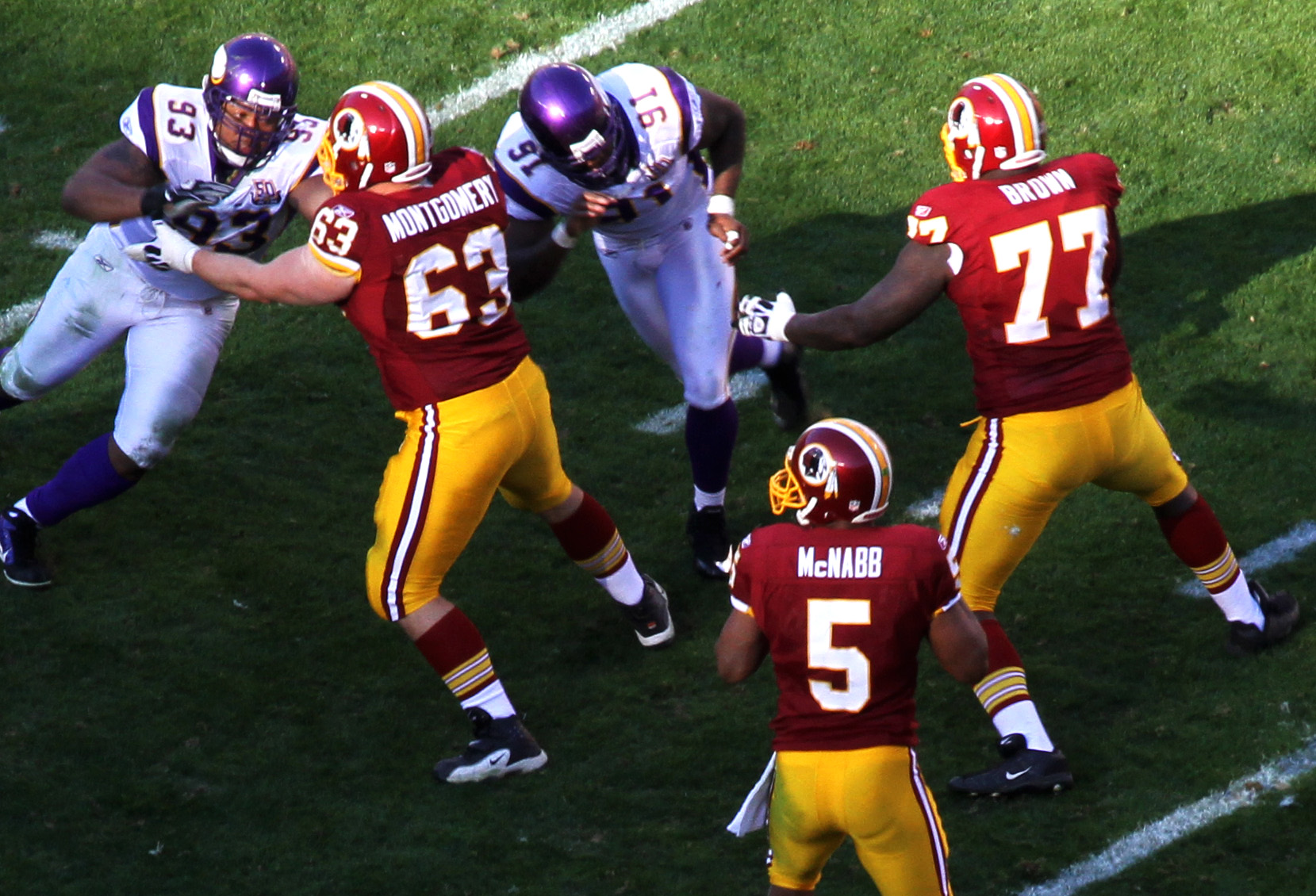
McNabb prepares to pass against the Minnesota Vikings

In the press conference following the Eagles' loss to Dallas, and even up to April 1, Andy Reid stated that McNabb would remain the starting quarterback in Philadelphia for the 2010 season. However, on April 4, the Eagles traded McNabb to the Washington Redskins in return for a second-round (37th overall) pick in the 2010 NFL draft and a conditional third- or fourth-round pick in the 2011 NFL draft. The conditional pick became a fourth-round pick in 2011, which was traded to the Tampa Bay Buccaneers in exchange for a lower fourth-round pick in 2011 and a fourth-round pick in 2012. The fourth-round pick in 2012 was then traded, along with a 2012 third-round pick, to the Houston Texans for a lower 2012 third-round pick, which would be used to select quarterback Nick Foles, and linebacker DeMeco Ryans.

In the first week of the 2010 season, McNabb and head coach Mike Shanahan led the Redskins to a 13–7 victory over the Dallas Cowboys. In week 2, McNabb nearly engineered a victory over the Houston Texans, passing for 426 yards (third-most of his career), but came up just short of a victory when the Texans prevailed 30–27 in overtime. In week 4, on October 3, McNabb played against the Eagles for the first time, returning with the Redskins to Lincoln Financial Field in Philadelphia. Although McNabb posted only pedestrian statistics, the Redskins won 17–12. During pregame introductions, McNabb received a standing ovation from Eagles fans, then hugged former coach Andy Reid at their postgame handshake.

In week 5, McNabb struggled for the first three quarters, but rallied the Redskins to a 16–13 overtime victory against the eventual Super Bowl champion Green Bay Packers at FedExField. He was 26–49 for 357 yards with one touchdown and one interception. In week 6, McNabb was 29 of 45 for 246 yards. He threw one touchdown and was intercepted twice, with the second interception coming on fourth down in the last minute of the fourth quarter against the visiting Indianapolis Colts. The Redskins fell to the Colts 27–24. McNabb's passer rating was 67.5.

In week 8, Shanahan stated in a press conference that McNabb would remain the Redskins' starting quarterback. On November 15, 2010, McNabb signed a five-year extension worth $78 million ($3.5 million guaranteed) with a chance to make it $88 million by completing incentives. The deal stated that if McNabb was not cut or traded at the conclusion of the 2010 season, he would receive a $10 million bonus. The same day, the Redskins suffered a 59–28 loss to his former team, the Eagles, at home on Monday Night Football. McNabb finished the game going 17 of 31 for 295 yards with two touchdowns and three interceptions.

On December 17, 2010, head coach Mike Shanahan relegated McNabb to the third quarterback position for the rest of this season, stating that he wanted to evaluate backup Rex Grossman in game play.

McNabb had perhaps one of the worst years of his career since 1999, posting career lows in season passer rating (77.1) and TD-INT ratio (0.9). However, at the time McNabb was demoted to third string, he was on pace to total 4,156 passing yards for the season, which would have broken the Redskins' all-time franchise record, and been the first time he had exceeded the 4,000-yard mark in his career. McNabb was ranked 100th in the first ranking of NFL players by their peers on the NFL Top 100 Players of 2011, placing 7th among the NFC's quarterbacks and 12th overall.

=== Minnesota Vikings ===
On July 27, 2011, the Washington Redskins and Minnesota Vikings came to an agreement on terms for a trade. After restructuring his contract, Washington traded McNabb to Minnesota in exchange for a sixth-round draft pick in 2012 and a conditional sixth-round draft pick in 2013. McNabb was rumored to be a possible addition to the Vikings for the past three years, in part due to his relationship with then-coach Brad Childress, the former Eagles offensive coordinator. Vikings punter Chris Kluwe agreed to give McNabb his number 5 jersey, in exchange for a $5,000 donation to Kick for a Cure, McNabb to promote Kluwe's band "Tripping Icarus" during a press conference, and an ice cream cone.

After starting the 2011 season with a 1–5 record, on October 18, it was announced that McNabb would no longer be the starting quarterback for the Vikings, as the job was given to rookie Christian Ponder for the remainder of the season.

McNabb requested and was granted his release from the team on December 1, 2011. Potential destinations for McNabb included the Houston Texans, Kansas City Chiefs, and his hometown Chicago Bears, all three of which lost their starting quarterbacks for the season to injury, but were still making playoff pushes. The Texans had signed Jake Delhomme and expressed no interest in McNabb, while the Bears and Chiefs put in waiver claims for Kyle Orton, who ended up with the Chiefs. The Bears subsequently signed Josh McCown, who had been unsigned since September but had familiarity with the Mike Martz offensive system run in Chicago. They decided that it was too late to add McNabb for the playoff hunt, as it would be tough to grasp the complicated offense in the short period of time.

On July 29, 2013, McNabb officially retired from professional football as a member of the Philadelphia Eagles.

== Career statistics ==
Legend
	Led the league
**Bold**	Career best

=== NFL ===
==== Regular season ====
Year	Team	Games			Passing												Rushing				Sacks		Fumbles	
Year	Team	GP	GS	Record	Cmp	Att	Pct	Yds	Y/A	Y/G	Lng	TD	Int	TD%	Int%	Rtg	Att	Yds	Y/A	TD	Sck	Yds	Fum	Lost
1999	PHI	12	6	2–4	106	216	49.1	948	4.9	79.0	63	8	7	3.7	3.2	60.1	47	313	6.7	0	28	204	8	2
2000	PHI	16	16	11–5	330	569	58.0	3,365	5.9	210.3	70	21	13	3.7	2.3	77.8	**86**	**629**	**7.3**	**6**	45	262	7	2
2001	PHI	16	16	11–5	285	493	57.8	3,233	6.6	202.1	64	25	12	5.1	2.4	84.3	82	482	5.9	2	39	273	8	**0**
2002	PHI	10	10	7–3	211	361	58.4	2,289	6.3	228.9	59	17	6	4.7	1.7	86.0	63	460	**7.3**	**6**	28	166	6	**0**
2003	PHI	16	16	12–4	275	478	57.5	3,216	6.7	201.0	59	16	11	3.3	2.3	79.6	71	355	5.0	3	43	253	9	3
2004	PHI	15	15	**13–2**	300	469	**64.0**	3,875	8.3	258.3	80	**31**	8	**6.6**	1.7	**104.7**	41	220	5.4	3	32	192	8	6
2005	PHI	9	9	4–5	211	357	59.1	2,507	7.0	**278.6**	**91**	16	9	4.5	2.5	85.0	25	55	2.2	1	19	**112**	8	3
2006	PHI	10	10	5–5	180	316	57.0	2,647	**8.4**	264.7	87	18	6	5.7	1.9	95.5	32	212	6.6	3	21	140	3	2
2007	PHI	14	14	8–6	291	473	61.5	3,324	7.0	237.4	75	19	7	4.0	1.5	89.9	50	236	4.7	0	44	227	9	5
2008	PHI	16	16	9–6–1	**345**	**571**	60.4	**3,916**	6.9	244.8	90	23	11	4.0	1.9	86.4	39	147	3.8	2	23	149	7	5
2009	PHI	14	14	10–4	267	443	60.3	3,553	8.0	253.8	60	22	10	5.0	2.3	92.9	37	140	3.8	2	35	264	10	3
2010	WAS	13	13	5–8	253	437	57.9	3,377	7.2	259.8	76	14	15	3.0	3.2	77.1	29	151	5.2	0	37	271	10	1
2011	MIN	6	6	1–5	94	156	60.3	1,026	6.6	171.0	60	4	**2**	2.6	**1.3**	82.9	14	59	4.2	1	**16**	113	**2**	**0**
Career		167	161	98−62−1	3,170	5,374	59.0	37,276	6.9	223.2	91	234	117	4.4	2.2	85.6	616	3,459	5.6	29	410	2626	95	30

==== Postseason ====
Year	Team	Games			Passing												Rushing				Sacks		Fumbles	
Year	Team	GP	GS	Record	Cmp	Att	Pct	Yds	Y/A	Y/G	Lng	TD	Int	TD%	Int%	Rtg	Att	Yds	Avg	TD	Sck	Yds	Fum	Lost
2000	PHI	2	2	1–1	44	74	59.5	342	4.6	171.0	25	3	2	4.1	2.7	73.1	13	49	3.8	1	8	51	2	1
2001	PHI	3	3	**2–1**	60	95	**63.2**	627	6.6	209.0	43	5	3	5.3	3.2	86.6	**16**	**120**	7.5	**2**	8	46	2	1
2002	PHI	2	2	1–1	46	79	58.2	490	6.2	245.0	42	1	**1**	1.3	**1.3**	75.4	7	41	5.9	0	**4**	31	3	2
2003	PHI	2	2	1–1	31	61	50.8	348	5.7	174.0	45	2	3	3.3	4.9	58.6	13	117	**9.0**	0	12	77	2	1
2004	PHI	3	3	**2–1**	68	110	61.8	823	**7.5**	274.3	52	**7**	3	**6.4**	2.7	**94.6**	14	35	2.5	0	7	46	2	**0**
2006	PHI	Did not play due to injury																						
2008	PHI	3	3	**2–1**	**73**	**121**	60.3	**892**	7.4	**297.3**	**71**	5	4	4.1	3.3	83.1	7	47	6.7	1	5	35	2	2
2009	PHI	1	1	0–1	19	37	51.4	230	6.2	230.0	27	1	**1**	2.7	2.7	68.5	2	13	6.5	0	**4**	**22**	**1**	1
Career		16	16	9–7	341	577	59.1	3,752	6.5	234.5	71	24	17	4.2	2.9	80.0	72	422	5.9	4	48	308	14	8

=== College ===
==== College football ====
Season	Team	Passing						Rushing		
Season	Team	Cmp	Att	Pct	Yds	TD	Int	Att	Yds	TD
1994	Syracuse	Redshirt								
1995	Syracuse	128	207	61.8	1,991	16	6	123	261	2
1996	Syracuse	118	215	54.9	1,776	19	9	97	**458**	3
1997	Syracuse	145	**265**	54.7	**2,488**	20	6	110	404	6
1998	Syracuse	**157**	251	**62.6**	2,134	**22**	**5**	**135**	438	**8**
Total		548	938	58.4	8,389	77	26	465	1,561	19

==== College basketball ====
Year	Team	GP	GS	MPG	FG	FG%	FT	FT%	3PT	3PT%	APG	RPG	SPG	BPG	PPG
1995–96	Syracuse	5	0	3.8	2–12	16.70%	1–1	100%	0–2	0%	.20	.60	.20	.20	1.0
1996–97	Syracuse	19	0	7.5	13–28	46.40%	8–14	57.4%	2–7	28.60%	.50	1.30	.30	.20	2.8

== Career highlights ==
=== Awards and honors ===
McNabb's number was retired by the Eagles in 2013.

NFL

- 2× CBS Radio NFC Player of the Year (2000, 2004)
- DC Touchdown Club NFC Player of the Year (2004)
- 101 Awards NFC Offensive Player of the Year (2004)
- 6× Pro Bowl selection (2000, 2001, 2002, 2003, 2004, 2009)
- NFC champion (2004)
- 4× NFC Offensive Player of the Month
  - September 2002; November 2003; September 2004; September 2005
- 16× Offensive Player of the Week
  - 8× PFW NFL Offensive Player of the Week (2000 Week 13; 2001 Week 16; 2002 Week 11; 2004 Week 13; 2005 Week 2; 2006 Weeks 1 and 5; 2007 Week 3)
  - 8× NFC Offensive Player of the Week (2000 Weeks 13 and 15; 2001 Divisional playoff; 2002 Week 3; 2003 Week 11 and Divisional playoff; 2004 Week 13 and Divisional playoff)
- NFL Top 100: 100th (2011)
- Philadelphia Eagles No. 5 retired
- Philadelphia Eagles 75th anniversary team
- Philadelphia Eagles Hall of Fame
- Philadelphia Sports Hall of Fame
- National Quarterback Club Hall of Fame

NCAA

- Big East Offensive Player of the Decade (1990s)
- 3× Big East Offensive Player of the Year (1996–1998)
- Big East Rookie of the Year (1995)
- 4× First-team All-Big East (1995–1998)
- Syracuse Football All-Century Team
- Syracuse Orange No. 5 retired
- Atlantic Coast Conference All-Time Football Honors
- Syracuse University, George Arents Pioneer Medal

=== Records ===
==== NFL records ====
- Career, most postseason wins by a quarterback whose teams did not win the Super Bowl: 9 (tied with Jim Kelly)
- Single season, most 40+ yard completions: 20
- Single game, most times sacked: 12 (tied with two others)
- Single game, highest passer rating: 158.3 (tied with many)

==== NFL firsts ====
First quarterback with:

- Career interception percentage less than 2.1% and more than 4,000 career pass attempts
- Career interception percentage less than 2.3% and more than 5,000 career pass attempts
- Career total touchdowns per interception greater than 2.20 and more than 5,000 career pass attempts
- More than 30 passing touchdowns and less than 10 interceptions in a season
- More than 22 consecutive completions over a two-game span
- More than 100 yards rushing in a postseason game
- More than 100 yards rushing and more than 200 yards passing in a postseason game

==== Philadelphia Eagles franchise records ====
Career

- Passing yards: 32,873
- Total offense yards (passing + rushing – sacks): 33,880
- Passing TDs: 216
- Total TDs: 244
- Completions: 2,801
- Attempts: 4,746
- Games played at quarterback: 148
- Games started at quarterback: 142
- Wins: 92
- Pro Bowls by quarterback: 6
- Pro Bowls by quarterback, consecutive: 5
- Games with 300+ yards passing: 30
- Games with 300+ yards total offense: 37
- Games with 3+ passing TDs: 29
- Games with 3+ total TDs: 38
- Games with 4+ passing TDs: 11
- Games with 4+ total TDs: 15
- Games with 5+ total TDs: 2 (tied with two others)

Season

- Most 300+ yard passing games: 5 (tied with three others)
- Most 4+ touchdown games: 5

Game

- Highest passer rating: 158.3 (tied with Nick Foles and Jalen Hurts)
- Consecutive 300+ yard passing games: 3 (tied with four others)

Postseason

- Career passing yards: 3,752
- Career total offense yards (passing + rushing – sacks): 3,866
- Career passing TDs: 24
- Career total TDs: 28
- Career completions: 341
- Career attempts: 577
- Career interceptions: 17
- Career rushing yards by quarterback: 422
- Career sacks: 48
- Career sack yards: 308
- Wins: 9
- Conference championship appearances: 5
- Consecutive conference championship appearances: 4
- Games with 300+ yards passing: 2 (tied with Nick Foles)
- Games with 300+ yards total offense: 3
- Games with 3+ passing TDs: 2 (tied with Nick Foles)
- Games with 3+ total TDs: 4
- Single season, attempts: 121
- Single season, passing touchdowns: 7
- Single season, sacks: 12
- Single season, sack yards: 77
- Single game, most rushing yards by quarterback: 107
- Single game, completions: 30
- Single game, passing TDs: 3 (tied with three others)
- Single game, interceptions: 3 (tied with three others)
- Single game, sacks: 8
- Single game, sack yards: 49

==== College records ====
Big East records

- 2nd – touchdown passes (77)
- 2nd – touchdowns responsible for (96) behind Pat White
- 5th – passing yards (8,389)
- 3rd – total offensive yards (9,950) behind Matt Grothe and Pat White
- 1st – total offensive plays (1,403)

Syracuse University records

- 1st – total yards per game (221.1)
- 1st – passing efficiency (155.1)
- 1st – yards per attempt (9.1)

== Broadcasting career ==
In September 2012, McNabb joined the NFL Network as an analyst. In 2013, McNabb became an analyst on Fox Sports Live, Fox Sports 1's flagship program, and in August 2014, it was announced that McNabb would provide color commentary alongside Dick Stockton for a few games during the 2014 NFL season for Fox. He resigned from Fox in late 2015. In August 2016, McNabb became the lead analyst for beIN Sports college football coverage, and he also joined ESPN Radio as an analyst.

On December 12, 2017, McNabb was suspended by ESPN as the organization investigated allegations of sexual harassment when he worked at NFL Network. In January 2018, McNabb and fellow football analyst Eric Davis were officially fired from the network.

On September 18, 2023, McNabb joined Outkick for a new show The Five Spot With Donovan McNabb.

== Personal life ==
McNabb married his college sweetheart, Raquel Ann Sarah "Roxie" Nurse, in June 2003. They have four children: daughter Alexis, who was born on September 23, 2004, twins Sariah and Donovan Jr., who were born in 2008, and Devin James, who was born in 2009. The family splits their time between homes in Moorestown, New Jersey and Chandler, Arizona.

In 2002, McNabb, who holds a Bachelor of Science degree in speech communication from Syracuse University, was named to the institution's board of trustees; he is one of the youngest trustees to have served there. McNabb currently is an athlete partner and serves on the advisory board for MODe Sports Nutrition.

McNabb is the brother-in-law of former Canadian Football League (CFL) player Richard Nurse. Through this marriage, McNabb is the uncle of Canadian ice hockey defenceman Darnell Nurse, who was the seventh overall pick by the Edmonton Oilers in the 2013 NHL entry draft, Kia Nurse, a professional basketball player for the Toronto Tempo and the Canada women's national basketball team, and Sarah Nurse, a professional ice hockey player for the Vancouver Goldeneyes and competed on Team Canada's national women's hockey team at the 2018 Winter Olympics and the 2022 Winter Olympics.

In April 2014, McNabb served a one-day jail sentence in Maricopa County, Arizona for a 2013 driving under the influence (DUI) conviction.

On June 28, 2015, McNabb was arrested for DUI following a traffic accident in Gilbert, Arizona. He pleaded guilty and was sentenced to 90 days, 18 to be served in jail and the remainder under house arrest. He was also assessed a $6,000 fine and required to do 30 hours of community service. He paid his fine and began serving his time on November 30, 2015. On December 18, McNabb was released from jail after having served an 18-day sentence, and then completed a 72-day house arrest sentence.

== Charity, nonprofit, and volunteer activities ==
In 2000, McNabb started his own charity called the Donovan McNabb Fund to raise awareness about diabetes. The charity has raised hundreds of thousands of dollars for diabetes awareness.

In 2009, McNabb donated $2.5 million to help fund the construction of a new neonatal intensive care unit (NICU) in the Virtua Voorhees Hospital in Voorhees, NJ where the family's four children were born. The McNabb Family NICU has served patients at the hospital since 2011.

In 2019, McNabb's wife Raquel Nurse McNabb co-founded the Caris Sports Foundation, a nonprofit organization to help provide financial aid for disadvantaged youth to participate in athletics. McNabb serves as a spokesperson for the foundation.

In 2021, McNabb co-founded The QB Legacy (QBL), a nonprofit group to provide mentoring and coaching to young quarterbacks (middle school through college) in underserved communities. In addition to quarterback skills, QBL camps educate young athletes about leadership, emotional and spiritual resilience, collegiate eligibility and recruiting, and financial literacy. Instructors include McNabb, former NFL quarterbacks Jeff Blake, Quincy Carter, Akili Smith, and other players and coaches from the NFL, CFL, and collegiate levels.

== See also ==
- List of NFL quarterbacks who have posted a perfect passer rating
- List of Philadelphia Eagles first-round draft picks
