= Carl Barisich =

American football player (born 1951)

No. 74, 78
- Position: Defensive tackle

Personal information
- Born: July 12, 1951 (age 75); Jersey City, New Jersey, U.S.
- Listed height: 6 ft 4 in (1.93 m)
- Listed weight: 258 lb (117 kg)

Career information
- High school: Bergen Catholic (Oradell, New Jersey)
- College: Princeton
- NFL draft: 1973: 11th round, 281st overall pick

Career history
- Cleveland Browns (1973–1975); Seattle Seahawks (1976); Miami Dolphins (1977–1980); New York Giants (1981)

Awards and highlights
- First-team All-East (1972)
- Stats at Pro Football Reference

Carl John Barisich (born July 12, 1951) is an American former professional football player who was a defensive tackle in the National Football League (NFL) for the Cleveland Browns, Seattle Seahawks, Miami Dolphins, and the New York Giants. He played college football for the Princeton Tigers and was selected by the Browns in the 11th round of the 1973 NFL draft.

== Early life ==
Barisich played high school football at Bergen Catholic High School in Oradell, New Jersey. He then played college football at Princeton University and was selected in the eleventh round of the 1973 NFL draft with the 281st overall pick.
