= Bryant Salter =

American football player (born 1950)

No. 30, 46
- Position: Defensive back

Personal information
- Born: January 22, 1950 (age 76); Pittsburgh, Pennsylvania, U.S.
- Listed height: 6 ft 4 in (1.93 m)
- Listed weight: 195 lb (88 kg)

Career information
- High school: South Hills (PA)
- College: Pittsburgh
- NFL draft: 1971: 5th round, 115th overall pick

Career history
- San Diego Chargers (1971–1973); Washington Redskins (1974–1975); Baltimore Colts (1976); Miami Dolphins (1976)

Awards and highlights
- First-team All-East (1970)

Career NFL statistics
- Interceptions: 17
- Fumble recoveries: 5
- Stats at Pro Football Reference

Bryant J. Salter (born January 22, 1950) is an American former professional football player who was a safety in the National Football League (NFL) for the San Diego Chargers, Washington Redskins, Baltimore Colts, and the Miami Dolphins. He played college football for the Pittsburgh Panthers and also competed on their track and field team, where he placed third at the 1970 NCAA University Division Outdoor Track and Field Championships in the triple jump.

He was selected in the fifth round of the 1971 NFL draft. He went on to join the United States Foreign Service and eventually served as a consul in Mexico and chargé d’affaires to Antigua and Barbuda and Saint Kitts and Nevis from January 1991 until March 1994. He would also receive a master's degree from the Harvard Kennedy School.
