= Brian Herosian =

American gridiron football player (born 1950)

No. 29
- Position: Safety

Personal information
- Born: September 14, 1950 (age 76); Worcester, Massachusetts, U.S.
- Listed height: 6 ft 3 in (1.91 m)
- Listed weight: 200 lb (91 kg)

Career information
- High school: Worcester (MA) Academy
- College: Connecticut
- NFL draft: 1973: undrafted

Career history
- Baltimore Colts (1973); Winnipeg Blue Bombers (1975–1979)

Awards and highlights
- Second-team All-East (1972)

Career NFL statistics
- Games played: 12
- Stats at Pro Football Reference

Career CFL statistics
- Games played: 65
- Interceptions: 17
- Punt returns: 24

Brian Herosian (born September 14, 1950) is a former professional defensive back in the National Football League (NFL) and the Canadian Football League (CFL).

A native of Worcester, Massachusetts, Herosian attended Worcester Academy, where he excelled in football, basketball, and baseball, graduating in 1969. He matriculated to the University of Connecticut where he starred in football and baseball. Herosian played for the Falmouth Commodores of the Cape Cod Baseball League in 1971 and 1972. At Falmouth, he was named a league all-star in 1971, and fanned 15 batters in a game in 1972. Herosian played in the 1972 College World Series and was drafted by the New York Yankees in the fourth round of the secondary phase of the 1973 Major League Baseball draft.

Herosian played for the Baltimore Colts in 1973, and went on to play for the Winnipeg Blue Bombers of the Canadian Football League from 1975 to 1979.

Herosian achieved the level of EDC in the Amway business.
