= Marco Battaglia =

American football player (born 1973)

No. 89, 84, 81, 47
- Position: Tight end

Personal information
- Born: January 25, 1973 (age 53); Howard Beach, New York, U.S.
- Listed height: 6 ft 3 in (1.91 m)
- Listed weight: 250 lb (113 kg)

Career information
- High school: St. Francis (Queens)
- College: Rutgers
- NFL draft: 1996: 2nd round, 39th overall pick

Career history
- Cincinnati Bengals (1996–2001); Washington Redskins (2001); Tampa Bay Buccaneers (2002); Pittsburgh Steelers (2002); Miami Dolphins (2003)*; Carolina Panthers (2003); Pittsburgh Steelers (2005)*
- * Offseason or practice squad member only

Awards and highlights
- Super Bowl champion (XXXVII); Unanimous All-American (1995); Big East Offensive Player of the Year (1995); First-team All-Big East (1995)

Career NFL statistics
- Receptions: 71
- Receiving yards: 660
- Receiving touchdowns: 2
- Stats at Pro Football Reference

Marco Antonio Battaglia (born January 25, 1973) is an American former professional football player who was a tight end in the National Football League (NFL). Battaglia played college football for the Rutgers Scarlet Knights, earning unanimous All-American honors in 1995. He was selected by the Cincinnati Bengals in the second round of the 1996 NFL draft, and played for the Bengals, Washington Redskins, Pittsburgh Steelers, Tampa Bay Buccaneers and Carolina Panthers of the NFL.

== Early life ==
Battaglia was born in Howard Beach, New York. He attended St. Francis Preparatory School in Queens, New York, and played high school football for the St. Francis Terriers.

== College career ==
He attended Rutgers University in New Jersey, where he played for the Rutgers Scarlet Knights football team from 1992 to 1995. Battaglia became the first tight end in NCAA history to be named a conference player of the year and is the only tight end to do so from a power conference. As a senior in 1995, he was recognized as a consensus first-team All-American at tight end for the Scarlet Knights. The BIG EAST Offensive Player of the Year, Battaglia was recognized by Sports Illustrated as being the top tight end in the decade of the 90's in their publication of The College Football Book.

== Professional career ==
The Cincinnati Bengals selected Battaglia in the second round of the 1996 NFL draft. He played for the Bengals from 1996 to 2001. He joined the Washington Redskins mid-season in 2001, and also played for the Pittsburgh Steelers and Tampa Bay Buccaneers in 2002, and the Carolina Panthers in 2003. In eight NFL seasons, Battaglia played in ninety-six games and started eleven of them, and compiled seventy-one receptions, 660 receiving yards and two touchdown receptions.

== Personal life ==
Battaglia currently lives in Middle Village, New York, with his family. He is a friend and occasional personal trainer of radio host Howard Stern. In March 2002, he broke Howard's thumb when he accidentally dropped some weights on it.
