= Ed Marinaro =

American football player and actor (born 1950)

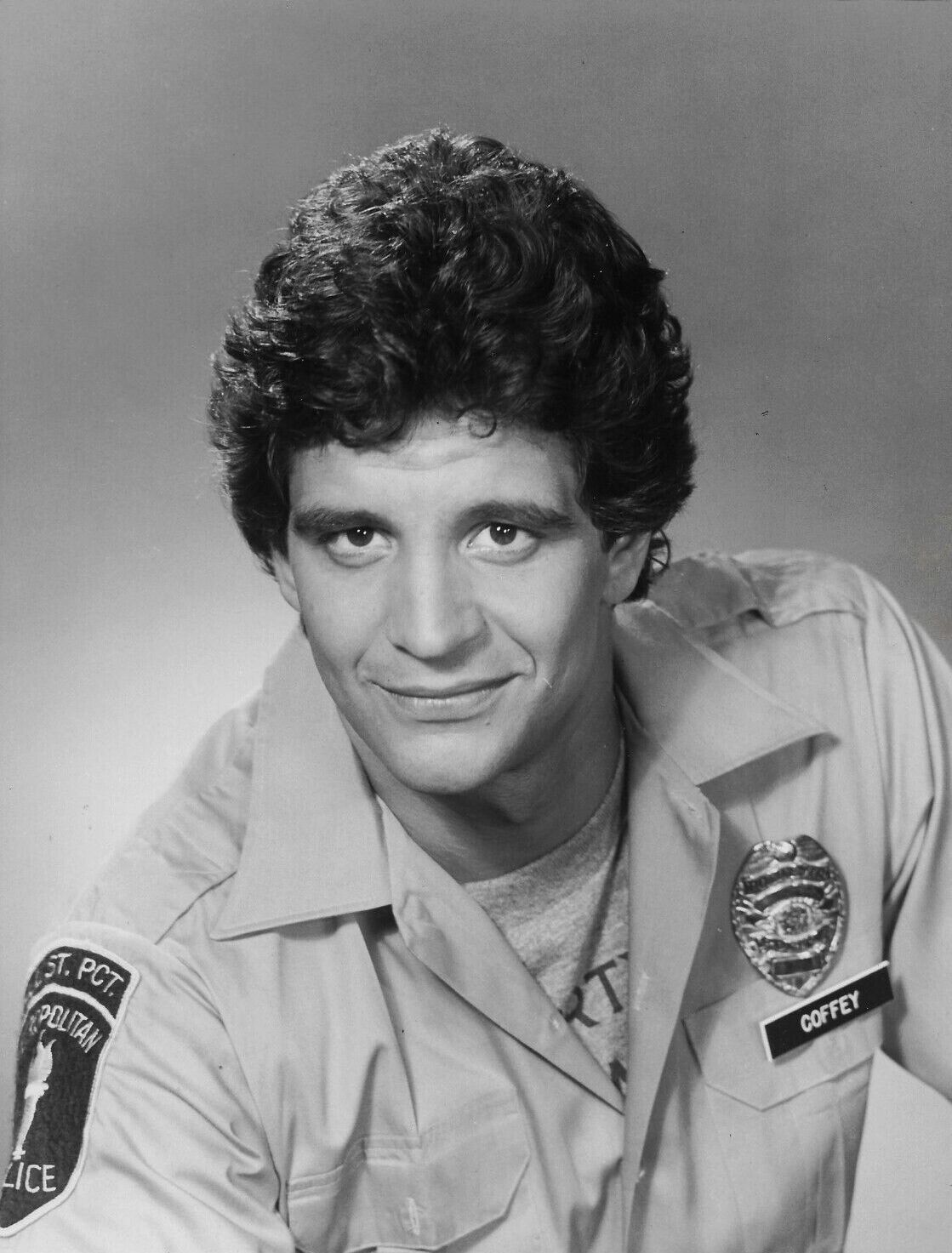
- Marinaro in Hill Street Blues, 1981

No. 49
- Position: Running back

Personal information
- Born: March 31, 1950 (age 76); New York City, New York, U.S.
- Listed height: 6 ft 2 in (1.88 m)
- Listed weight: 212 lb (96 kg)

Career information
- High school: New Milford (New Milford, New Jersey)
- College: Cornell (1969–1971)
- NFL draft: 1972: 2nd round, 50th overall pick

Career history
- Minnesota Vikings (1972–1975); New York Jets (1976); Seattle Seahawks (1977)

Awards and highlights
- Maxwell Award (1971); SN Player of the Year (1971); Unanimous All-America (1971); First-team All-America (1970); Third-team All-America (1969); 3× First-team All-East (1969, 1970, 1971)

Career NFL statistics
- Rushing attempts: 383
- Rushing yards: 1,319
- Rushing touchdowns: 6
- Receptions: 146
- Receiving yards: 1,176
- Receiving touchdowns: 7
- Stats at Pro Football Reference
- College Football Hall of Fame

Ed Marinaro (born March 31, 1950) is an American actor and former professional football running back who played in the National Football League (NFL) for the Minnesota Vikings. He played college football for the Cornell Big Red, where he was a unanimous All-America and won the Maxwell Award in 1971.

From 2010 to 2011, Marinaro starred in the football comedy series Blue Mountain State. He is also known as a regular cast member of Hill Street Blues, playing Officer Joe Coffey for five seasons (1981–1986).

== Career ==
=== Football ===
Marinaro played high school football in New Milford, New Jersey, for the New Milford High School Knights.

Marinaro played college football at Cornell University, where he was a three-time All-America, and set over 16 NCAA records. He was the first running back in NCAA history to run for 4,000 career rushing yards, and led the nation in rushing in 1971.

Marinaro was runner-up to Pat Sullivan for the Heisman Trophy in 1971, the highest finish for an Ivy League player since the league de-emphasized football in the mid-1950s. Princeton's Dick Kazmaier won the award in 1951 when the Ivy was still considered a major football conference. Marinaro won the 1971 Maxwell Award and the UPI College Football Player of the Year as the top player in college football. He holds four NCAA records: most rushes per game in a season (39.6 in 1971), career average carries per game (34.0, 1969–71), most rushing yards per game over an entire career (174.6, 1969–71), and earliest game reaching 1,000 rushing yards (5th, 1971).

While at Cornell, Marinaro was a member of Psi Upsilon and was selected for membership in the Sphinx Head Society. He went on to play professional football for six seasons with the Minnesota Vikings, New York Jets and Seattle Seahawks, appearing in Super Bowl VIII and Super Bowl IX with the Vikings. He scored 6 touchdowns over his career.

=== Acting ===
After leaving football, Marinaro became an actor. He has been a cast member on a number of television series, including Laverne & Shirley and Sisters. He joined the regular cast of Hill Street Blues in 1981, playing officer Joe Coffey until 1986. Furthermore, he co-presented the Crystal Light USA National Aerobic Championship. He also appeared in the 2006 film Circus Island.

Marinaro played the head football coach for three seasons on Spike TV's comedy, Blue Mountain State.

In September 2019, Marinaro was a guest on Turner Classic Movies. With Ben Mankiewicz, he appeared in wraparounds and provided introductions for films in a college football-themed series.

== Personal life ==
Marinaro is married to fitness expert Tracy York and has one son.

== Honors ==
Marinaro was inducted to the College Football Hall of Fame in 1991.

In January 2020, Marinaro was named by ESPN as one of the "150 greatest players in college football's 150-year history", ranking at number 126. He was one of only three Ivy League players on the list. ESPN wrote of Marinaro, "It is up for debate as to whether Marinaro is the last great running back produced by the Ivy League. What is not up for debate are the numbers that illustrate his production."

== Filmography ==
=== Film ===
Year	Title	Role
1978	Fingers	Gino
1980	The Gong Show Movie	Man In Locker Room
1983	Imps*	Phil
1987	Dead Aim	Malcolm "Mace" Douglas
1991	Queens Logic	Jack
1998	The Protector	Gabriel
2005	Urban Legends: Bloody Mary	Bill Owens
2006	Circus Camp	Carlos Carrera
2006	Fist of the Warrior	Raymond Miles
2016	Blue Mountain State: The Rise of Thadland	Coach Marty Daniels
2018	An L.A. Minute	Jake
2019	Love & Debt	Carl
2021	A Unicorn for Christmas	Horace

=== Television ===
Year	Title	Role	Notes
1977	The Edge of Night	Packey Dietrich	various episodes
1978	Flying High	Alex	Episode: "Swan Song for an Ugly Duckling"
1980	Eischied	Unknown	Episode: "Buddy System"
1980–1981	Laverne & Shirley	Sonny St. Jacques / Antonio DeFazio	11 episodes
1981–1986	Hill Street Blues	Officer Joe Coffey	104 episodes
1982	Born Beautiful	Doug Trainer	Television film
1983	Policewoman Centerfold	Nick Velano	Television film
1987	Tonight's the Night	Hayden Fox	Television film
1987	CBS Schoolbreak Special	Mr. Powell	Episode: "What If I'm Gay?"
1987	Private Eyes	Nickey "The Rose"	Episode: "Nickey the Rose"
1987–1988	Falcon Crest	John Remick	5 episodes
1988	Sharing Richard	Dr. Richard Bernowski	Television film
1988	Shades of Love: The Emerald Tear	Edward DeCoursey	Television film
1988	The Diamond Trap	Detective Brendan Thomas	Television film
1988	My Sister Sam	Billy Rossetti	Episode: "The Thrill of Agony, the Victory of Defeat"
1989	Dynasty	Creighton Boyd	2 episodes
1989	The Twilight Zone	Darius Stephens	Episode: "Father & Son Game"
1989	Baby Boom	Eric	Episode: "X-y-l-o-p-h-o-n-e"
1989	Mick and Frankie	Mick Loomis	Television film
1990	Grand	Eddie Pasetti	3 episodes
1990	Menu for Murder	Detective Joe Russo	Television film
1991	Midnight Caller	Joe Holloway	Episode: "Her Dirty Little Secret"
1991	Monsters	Matrin	Episode: "Talk Nice to Me"
1991–1994	Sisters	Mitch Margolis	75 episodes
1992	Amy Fisher: My Story	Joey Buttafuoco	Television film
1993	Passport to Murder	Hank McKay	Television film
1994	Dancing with Danger	Derek Lidor	Television film
1994	Dream On	Policeman	Episode: "The Taking of Pablum 1-2-3: Part I"
1994	Touched by an Angel	Jack	Episode: "An Unexpected Snow"
1995	Favorite Deadly Sins	Actor Playing Frank Musso	Television film
1996	Deadly Web	Jones	Television film
1996	Panic in the Skies!	Brett Young	Television film
1996	Champs	Vince Mazzilli	11 episodes
1997	Doomsday Rock	FBI Agent Paul	Television film
1998	Grace Under Fire	Dan Gabriel	Episode: "Fire in the Hole"
1998	Catch Me If You Can	Captain Morris Bernasky	Television film
1999	A Gift of Love: The Daniel Huffman Story	Coach Jack Farkas	Television film
1999	Odd Man Out	Bill	Episode: "Punch Line"
1999	Oh, Grow Up	Sal	Episode: "Goodwill Hunter"
2000	Twice in a Lifetime	Mr. Bogart	Episode: "Curveball"
2001	Avalanche Alley	Rick	Television film
2002	Third Watch	Tommy	Episode: "Two Hundred and Thirty-Three Days"
2003	8 Simple Rules	Byron	Episode: "Good Moms Gone Wild"
2003	Monk	Stewart Babcock	Episode: "Mr. Monk and the 12th Man"
2005	Jane Doe: Til Death Do Us Part	Vincent Colabella	Television film
2008	Yeti: Curse of the Snow Demon	Coach Gorfida	Television film
2010–2011	Blue Mountain State	Coach Marty Daniels	39 episodes
2011	Days of Our Lives	Leo	3 episodes
2013	Drop Dead Diva	Peter Bronson	Episode: "Missed Congeniality"
2019	SnowComing	Coach Kerrigan	Television film

== See also ==
- List of NCAA Division I FBS career rushing touchdowns leaders
- List of NCAA major college football yearly rushing leaders
- List of NCAA major college football yearly scoring leaders

Records
Preceded by Steve Owens	NCAA Division I FBS Career Rushing Yards record 1971–1975	Succeeded by Archie Griffin
