= Tom Myers (safety) =

American football player (born 1950)

No. 37
- Position: Safety

Personal information
- Born: October 24, 1950 (age 76); Cohoes, New York, U.S.
- Listed height: 5 ft 11 in (1.80 m)
- Listed weight: 184 lb (83 kg)

Career information
- College: Syracuse
- NFL draft: 1972: 3rd round, 74th overall pick

Career history
- New Orleans Saints (1972–1981); Houston Gamblers (1984–1985)

Awards and highlights
- First-team All-Pro (1979); Pro Bowl (1979); New Orleans Saints Hall of Fame; First-team All-American (1971); 2× First-team All-East (1970, 1971); Second-team All-East (1969)

Career NFL statistics
- Interceptions: 36
- INT yards: 621
- Touchdowns: 2
- Stats at Pro Football Reference

Tom Myers (born October 24, 1950) is an American former professional football player who was a safety in the National Football League (NFL). He played college football for the Syracuse Orange, and was selected by the New Orleans Saints in the third round of 1972 NFL draft.

== Professional career ==
Myers played for the New Orleans Saints his entire career from 1972 to 1981 as the team's starting free safety for each of those seasons. In 1978, Myers recorded a 97-yard interception return for touchdown against the Minnesota Vikings, a Saints record. His best season was in 1979 when he was selected to the Pro Bowl and was named on the All-Pro team. As of the 2024 NFL season, Myers is still #2 on the All-Time New Orleans Saints Career Interceptions List.

He later played two seasons for the Houston Gamblers of the United States Football League.
