= Joe Ehrmann =

American football player (born 1949)

- Ehrmann in 1977

No. 76, 74
- Position: Defensive tackle

Personal information
- Born: March 29, 1949 (age 77); Buffalo, New York, U.S.
- Listed height: 6 ft 4 in (1.93 m)
- Listed weight: 254 lb (115 kg)

Career information
- High school: Riverside (Buffalo)
- College: Syracuse
- NFL draft: 1973: 1st round, 10th overall pick

Career history
- Baltimore Colts (1973–1980); Detroit Lions (1981–1982); Chicago Blitz (USFL) (1983); Arizona Wranglers (USFL) (1984); Orlando Renegades (USFL) (1985)

Awards and highlights
- First-team All-American (1970); 2× First-team All-East (1970, 1972); Second-team All-East (1969)

Career NFL statistics
- Games played: 121
- Starts: 76
- Sacks: 41.5
- Fumble recoveries: 3
- Interceptions: 1
- Stats at Pro Football Reference

Joseph Charles Ehrmann (/ˈɜːrmæn/ UR-man; born March 29, 1949) is an American former professional football player who was a defensive tackle in the National Football League (NFL) from 1973 through 1982. He played college football for the Syracuse Orangemen and was selected in the first round of the 1973 NFL draft by the Baltimore Colts with the tenth overall pick.

Ehrmann played with Baltimore for eight years as a member of the "Sack Pack," and finished his NFL career with the Detroit Lions as part of their vaunted "Silver Rush" defensive line in the early 1980s. He then played in the United States Football League (USFL) for the Chicago Blitz, Arizona Wranglers and Orlando Renegades.

== Recognition and awards ==
Ehrmann was named to Syracuse University's All-Century Football Team, and lettered in lacrosse. He received the Arents’ Award, SU's Most Distinguished Alumni honor for his contributions to society. He was the NFL's first Ed Block Courage Award Recipient. He has been named “The Most Important Coach in America” by Parade Magazine and the Institute of International Sport chose Joe as one of The Most Influential Sports Educators in America.

The Baltimore Business Journal selected Ehrmann as the Renaissance Person of the Decade for his dedication and commitment to Baltimore City's betterment. He was the National Fatherhood Initiative's Man of the Year and the Frederick Douglass National Man of the Year for empowering youth to prevent rape and other forms of male violence and improving lives of children by helping fathers become more involved.

== Syracuse University ==
Ehrmann attended Syracuse University, where he was a three-year football letterman in 1969, 1970 and 1972. Primarily a defensive tackle, he was an All-American selection in 1970. He was named to the university's football All-Century Team on October 28, 1999. He was also the recipient of the George Arents Pioneers Medal, the university's highest alumni honor, in 2004 and also lettered in lacrosse.

== Service off the field ==
In 1978, Ehrmann watched his 19-year-old brother Billy lose his five-month battle with cancer. This experience caused Ehrmann to rethink and reorder his priorities in life. Ehrmann spearheaded the construction of a Ronald McDonald House in Baltimore in memory of Billy, becoming a founding board member. In the off-season, Ehrmann attended classes at Dallas Theological Seminary and, following his football career, he attended Westminster Theological Seminary in Philadelphia, specializing in urban ministry. He was ordained in 1985.

In the years since then, Ehrmann created Building Men and Women for Others, an organization that addresses many societal challenges including violence, child advocacy, and much more. He also co-founded "The Door," a Baltimore community-based ministry addressing individual and family needs, promoting equity in education, social justice, racial reconciliation, and economic development. He also served as a preaching pastor of the 4,000-member Grace Fellowship Church in Baltimore.

After The Door, Ehrmann founded Coach for America in 2003 to inform, inspire and initiate individual, community and societal change through sports and coaching. The goal of CFA was to create a tipping point in the world of sports where coaches, educational institutions and sport organizations support and implement the idea that the physical, social, emotional and moral well-being of players are no longer considered beyond the scope of what sports and coaches can or should accomplish. Through a strategic and intentional focus, Joe developed InSideOut Coaching as part of a multi-systemic prevention and intervention model to assist the healthy development of youth and communities.

- In February 2013, Ehrmann spoke at TEDxBaltimore on what it means to “Be a Man.”
- On March 26, 2013, he spoke on an all-male panel called "Breaking the Male Code" hosted by Eve Ensler, addressing the issue of violence against women in the wake of the Steubenville High School Rape case.
- In March, 2013, Ehrmann spoke at the Safe to Compete Summit, a child sex abuse summit, featuring representatives from more than 50 youth-based sports groups, from USA Swimming to Special Olympics to the Cal Ripken, Sr. Foundation and the National Center for Missing & Exploited Children, which hosted the event at its headquarters.
- Ehrmann also appeared in the 2015 Netflix film The Mask You Live In: How America Is Failing Boys, which looks at the masculine socialization of boys.

== InSideOut Initiative ==
Ehrmann is the President of the InSideOut Initiative, an evidenced-based, systems-level approach that inspires and catalyzes communities to transform the current “win-at-all-costs” interscholastic sports culture to one that values the human growth and development of student-athletes.

== InSideOut Coaching: How Sports Can Transform Lives ==
Ehrmann is the author of the book InSideOut Coaching: How Sports Can Transform Lives which provides the basis for purpose-based athletics: connecting student-athletes to transformational coaches, in a nurturing community for their social, emotional and character development.

== Season of Life ==
Prompted by an article about the demolition of the Colts' Memorial Stadium, author Jeffrey Marx (who first met and was inspired by Ehrmann as a ball boy for the Baltimore Colts) reconnected with Ehrmann and became fascinated both with his ministry and his work as a volunteer football coach at Gilman School, an all-boys school in Baltimore. Joe and his friend Biff Poggi developed a coaching philosophy to develop healthy masculinity, relationship development and to promote social justice.

In 2004, Marx's book Season of Life was published, featuring the Gilman football team and Joe's transformational coaching. The book became a New York Times best-seller.

== Personal life ==
Ehrmann is a father of four and is currently the president of the InSideOut Initiative.
