= Bruce Taylor (American football) =

American football player (born 1948)

No. 44
- Position: Cornerback

Personal information
- Born: May 28, 1948 (age 78); Perth Amboy, New Jersey, U.S.
- Listed height: 6 ft 0 in (1.83 m)
- Listed weight: 193 lb (88 kg)

Career information
- High school: Perth Amboy
- College: Boston University (1967–1969)
- NFL draft: 1970: 1st round, 17th overall pick

Career history
- San Francisco 49ers (1970–1977)

Awards and highlights
- NFL Defensive Rookie of the Year (1970); Pro Bowl (1972); Second-team All-American (1969); First-team Little All-American (1969); First-team All-East (1969)

Career NFL statistics
- Interceptions: 18
- Fumble recoveries: 10
- Stats at Pro Football Reference
- College Football Hall of Fame

Bruce Lawrence Taylor (born May 28, 1948) is an American former professional football player who was spent his entire eight-year career as a cornerback for the San Francisco 49ers of the National Football League (NFL) from 1970 to 1977. He played college football for the Boston University Terriers and was selected by the 49ers in the first round of the 1970 NFL draft. With San Francisco, Taylor played in the NFC Championship Game in 1971 and 1972. He was also named to the Pro Bowl in 1972. During his football career, Taylor received several rookie of the year awards including ones from Pro Football Weekly and the Associated Press.

In 1978, Taylor was cut from the 49ers and briefly played for the Montreal Alouettes in the Canadian Football League (CFL). With the Alouettes, Taylor played in the Eastern Football Conference and Grey Cup championships held in 1978. Following his cut from the Oakland Raiders in 1979, Taylor worked in finance before becoming a Burger King owner in 1982. After expanding his Burger King locations to 18 stores by the late 1990s, Taylor returned to sports as a volunteer coach for a Florida high school in 2009. Taylor was inducted into the College Football Hall of Fame in 1997.

== Early life and education ==
On May 28, 1948, Taylor was born in Perth Amboy, New Jersey. Growing up, Taylor played baseball and basketball while in high school. After high school, Taylor was picked by the Baltimore Orioles in the 30th round of the 1966 Major League Baseball draft. He declined the offer by the Orioles to attend Boston University.

During his time at Boston, he played at the 1968 NCAA University Division baseball tournament on the Boston University Terriers team. As a football player, Taylor appeared at the Pasadena Bowl and East–West Shrine Bowl in 1969. He also worked as a schoolteacher and factory worker while attending university. In 1970, Taylor played in the Chicago College All-Star Game. He was the All Stars' Most Valuable Player at the game.

== Career ==
In 1970, Taylor turned down an offer to play in the Canadian Football League with the Montreal Alouettes. During the first round of the 1970 NFL draft, Taylor was picked 17th overall by the San Francisco 49ers. With the 49ers, Taylor appeared at the NFC Championship Game in 1971 and 1972. As part of the National Football Conference, Taylor played at the 1972 Pro Bowl.

Taylor continued to play with the 49ers until he injured his hamstring in July 1978. After sitting out the 49ers training camp due to injury, Taylor was cut from the team in August 1978. During his eight seasons with the 49ers, Taylor was the 1970 punt returns season leader with 516 yards. Overall, Taylor had 1323 punt return yards and 190 kick return yards during his 109 games in the NFL. He also accumulated 201 yards with his 18 interceptions.

During his football career, Taylor was employed by Dean Witter Reynolds and began his stockbroking experience. Taylor was a stockbroker upon leaving the 49ers before he joined the Montreal Alouettes in late 1978. As a substitute for injured Dickie Harris, Taylor and the Alouettes defeated the Ottawa Rough Riders at the 1978 Eastern Football Conference championship. While continuing to play as Harris's replacement, Taylor and the Alouettes lost to the Edmonton Eskimos at the 1978 Grey Cup. In May 1979, Taylor returned to the United States and joined a training camp for the Oakland Raiders. He remained with the Raiders for a few months before being cut in August 1979.

In 1979, Taylor stopped playing football and worked in finance for three years. After switching to fast food in 1982, Taylor owned Burger King locations in Seattle and Woodinville, Washington by the early 1990s. By the late 1990s, Taylor had opened Burger King stores in Chicago and owned eighteen locations. Taylor returned to sports in 2009 when he became a high school volunteer coach in Florida.

== Honors and personal life ==
In 1969, Taylor was named the best senior player in New England by the New England Football Writers Association. That year, the Gridiron Club of Boston chose Taylor as the best football player in New England. Taylor and Marty Liquori were each chosen by The New Jersey Sports Writers Association as "New Jersey's outstanding college athlete" in 1970. As a defensive player, Taylor won the 1970 rookie of the year awards from Pro Football Weekly and the Associated Press.

While a member of the National Football Conference, Taylor received rookie of the year awards for 1970 from the United Press International and Sporting News. For hall of fames, Taylor was named into Boston University Athletic Hall of Fame in 1970 and became part of the College Football Hall of Fame in 1997. Taylor is married and has two children.
