= Kevin Abrams (cornerback) =

American football player (born 1974)

No. 24
- Position: Cornerback

Personal information
- Born: February 28, 1974 (age 52); Tampa, Florida, U.S.
- Listed height: 5 ft 8 in (1.73 m)
- Listed weight: 170 lb (77 kg)

Career information
- High school: Hillsborough (Tampa)
- College: Syracuse
- NFL draft: 1997: 2nd round, 54th overall pick

Career history
- Detroit Lions (1997–2000)

Awards and highlights
- 2× First-team All-American (1995, 1996)

Career NFL statistics
- Tackles: 80
- Interceptions: 1
- Forced fumbles: 3
- Stats at Pro Football Reference

Kevin R. Abrams (born February 28, 1974) is an American former professional football player who was a cornerback in the National Football League (NFL). He was selected by the Detroit Lions in the second round of the 1997 NFL draft. He played college football for the Syracuse Orange.

== College career ==
Abrams signed his letter of intent to play college football at Syracuse University in 1992.
