= 1978–79 NFL playoffs =

American football tournament

- Dates: December 24, 1978–January 21, 1979
- Season: 1978
- Teams: 10
- Games played: 9
- Super Bowl XIII site: Miami Orange Bowl; Miami, Florida
- Defending champions: Dallas Cowboys
- Champion: Pittsburgh Steelers (3rd title)
- Runner-up: Dallas Cowboys
- Conference runners-up: Houston Oilers; Los Angeles Rams
NFL playoffs
← 1977–78	1979–80 →

The National Football League playoffs for the 1978 season began on December 24, 1978. The postseason tournament concluded with the Pittsburgh Steelers defeating the Dallas Cowboys in Super Bowl XIII, 35–31, on January 21, 1979, at the Orange Bowl in Miami.

This was the first year that the playoffs expanded to a ten-team format, adding a second wild card team – a fifth seed – from each conference. The three division winners were seeded 1–2–3, and the two wild cards teams were seeded 4–5. The two wild card teams from each conference played each other in the first round. Dubbed the "Wild Card Playoffs", the games were hosted by the #4 seeds. In most years, both the AFC and NFC wild card games were played on Sunday (with occasional exceptions when they conflicted with Christmas Day).

The three division winners (seeds 1, 2, and 3) in each conference received a bye for the wild card weekend, and automatically advanced to the Divisional Playoffs. The surviving wild card team in each conference advanced to the Divisional Round and played at the #1 seed. However, a rule remained in place which prohibited two teams from the same division meeting in the Divisional Round. If the surviving wild card team was from the same division as the #1 seed, that team would instead play at the #2 seed, while the #1 seed would host the #3 seed.

== Participants ==
Within each conference, the three division winners and the two non-division winners with the best overall regular season records qualified for the playoffs. The NFL did not use a fixed-bracket playoff system. The three division winners were seeded 1–3 based on their overall won-lost-tied record, and received a first-round bye while the wild card teams were seeded 4 and 5, and played in the first round, dubbed the wild-card playoffs or wild-card weekend, with the 4 seed hosting. The second round, the divisional playoffs, had a restriction where two teams from the same division could not meet: the surviving wild card team visited the division champion outside its division that had the higher seed, and the remaining two teams from that conference played each other. The two surviving teams from each conference's divisional playoff games then met in the respective AFC and NFC Conference Championship games, hosted by the higher seed. Finally the Super Bowl, the championship round of the playoffs, was played at a neutral site, with the designated home team based on an annual rotation by conference.

Playoff seeds
Seed	AFC	NFC
1	Pittsburgh Steelers (Central winner)	Los Angeles Rams (West winner)
2	New England Patriots (East winner)	Dallas Cowboys (East winner)
3	Denver Broncos (West winner)	Minnesota Vikings (Central winner)
4	Miami Dolphins (wild card)	Atlanta Falcons (wild card)
5	Houston Oilers (wild card)	Philadelphia Eagles (wild card)

== Bracket ==
Note: The Pittsburgh Steelers (the AFC 1 seed) did not play the Houston Oilers (the 5 seed), nor did the Los Angeles Rams (the NFC 1 seed) play the Atlanta Falcons (the 4 seed), in the Divisional playoff round because those teams were in the same division.

Dec 31 – Schaefer Stadium
5	Houston	31
Dec 24 – Miami Orange Bowl	Jan 7 – Three Rivers Stadium
2*	New England	14
AFC
5	Houston	17	5	Houston	5
Dec 30 – Three Rivers Stadium
4	Miami	9	1	Pittsburgh	34
AFC Championship
3	Denver	10
Jan 21 – Miami Orange Bowl
1*	Pittsburgh	33
Divisional round
Wild-card round	A1	Pittsburgh	35
Dec 30 – Texas Stadium
N2	Dallas	31
Super Bowl XIII
4	Atlanta	20
Dec 24 – Fulton County Stadium	Jan 7 – Los Angeles Memorial Coliseum
2*	Dallas	27
NFC
5	Philadelphia	13	2	Dallas	28
Dec 31 – Los Angeles Memorial Coliseum
4	Atlanta	14	1	Los Angeles	0
NFC Championship
3	Minnesota	10
1*	Los Angeles	34

== Schedule ==
In the United States, CBS televised the NFC playoff games, while NBC broadcast the AFC games and Super Bowl XIII.

Round	Away team	Score	Home team	Date	Kickoff (ET / UTC−5)	TV
Wild-card round	Philadelphia Eagles	13–14	Atlanta Falcons	December 24, 1978	12:00 p.m.	CBS
Wild-card round	Houston Oilers	17–9	Miami Dolphins	December 24, 1978	4:00 p.m.	NBC
Divisional round	Denver Broncos	10–33	Pittsburgh Steelers	December 30, 1978	12:30 p.m.	NBC
Divisional round	Atlanta Falcons	20–27	Dallas Cowboys	December 30, 1978	4:00 p.m.	CBS
Divisional round	Houston Oilers	31–14	New England Patriots	December 31, 1978	1:00 p.m.	NBC
Divisional round	Minnesota Vikings	10–34	Los Angeles Rams	December 31, 1978	5:00 p.m.	CBS
Conference championships	Houston Oilers	5–34	Pittsburgh Steelers	January 7, 1979	1:00 p.m.	NBC
Conference championships	Dallas Cowboys	28–0	Los Angeles Rams	January 7, 1979	5:00 p.m.	CBS
Super Bowl XIII Orange Bowl Miami, Florida	Pittsburgh Steelers	35–31	Dallas Cowboys	January 21, 1979	4:00 p.m.	NBC

== Wild-card round ==
=== Sunday, December 24, 1978 ===
==== NFC: Atlanta Falcons 14, Philadelphia Eagles 13 ====
Philadelphia Eagles vs. Atlanta Falcons – Game summary

Quarter	1	2	3	4	Total
Eagles	6	0	7	0	13
Falcons	0	0	0	14	14

at Atlanta–Fulton County Stadium, Atlanta

- Game time: 12:30 p.m. EST
- Game attendance: 49,447
- Referee: Fred Silva
- TV announcers (CBS): Gary Bender and Hank Stram

Game information

First quarter

- PHI – Harold Carmichael 13-yard pass from Ron Jaworski (kick missed). Eagles 6–0.

Second quarter

- No scoring plays.

Third quarter

- PHI – Wilbert Montgomery 1-yard run (Mike Michel kick). Eagles 13–0.

Fourth quarter

- ATL – Jim Mitchell 20-yard pass from Steve Bartkowski (Tim Mazzetti kick). Eagles 13–7.
- ATL – Wallace Francis 37-yard pass from Steve Bartkowski (Tim Mazzetti kick). Falcons 14–13.

Top passers

- PHI – Ron Jaworski – 19/35, 190 yards, TD
- ATL – Steve Bartkowski – 18/32, 243 yards, 2 TD, 2 INT

Top rushers

- PHI – Mike Hogan – 14 rushes, 31 yards
- ATL – Haskel Stanback – 16 rushes, 58 yards

Top receivers

- PHI – Charlie Smith – 7 receptions, 108 yards
- ATL – Wallace Francis – 6 receptions, 135 yards, TD

This was a matchup of two teams that had ended prolonged postseason droughts. The Falcons were in the playoffs for the first time in their 13-year history while the Eagles were playing their first playoff game since their victory in the 1960 NFL Championship Game.

Philadelphia had been decimated by problems at the placekicker position all year long. Starting kicker Nick Mike-Mayer had made just 8 of 17 field goal attempts before suffering a season-ending injury in week 12. To replace him, coach Dick Vermeil used punter Mike Michel. Michel had done some placekicking in college, so Vermeil assigned him both roles. This did not pay off, as Michel missed 3 of 12 extra points during the remainder of the season, performing so poorly that the Eagles started attempting fourth down conversions deep in opponent territory rather than field goals. Coming into this playoff game, Michel had not attempted a single field goal, and the Eagles' issues in the kicking game played a decisive role in their loss. Coincidentally, the Falcons kicker in this game, rookie Tim Mazzetti, had been cut by Philadelphia in the preseason.

The Falcons won their first playoff game in team history after they overcame a 13–0 deficit by scoring 2 touchdowns in the final 5 minutes of the game. In the first quarter, Philadelphia's Cleveland Franklin recovered a fumble from Billy Ryckman on a punt return at the Falcons 13-yard line, setting up wide receiver Harold Carmichael's 13-yard touchdown reception from Ron Jaworski. However, Michel missed the ensuing extra point, which later became costly.

Neither team scored again until the third quarter when the Eagles took advantage of another Atlanta special teams miscue, this time a dismal 17-yard punt by John James that gave them a first down on their 40-yard line. Aided by a roughing the passer penalty and a pair of receptions by Charlie Smith, Jaworski led the team 60 yards to score on Wilbert Montgomery's 1-yard rushing touchdown. Michel's extra point was partially deflected, but still went in to give the Eagles a 13–0 lead. Later in the period, Michel had a chance to put the team up by three scores, but he missed a 42-yard field goal attempt, the first field goal kick of his career.

Still, the Eagles seemed in control of the game going into the fourth quarter. And with 9:52 left, they appeared to be in prime position to secure a win when cornerback Bobby Howard intercepted Falcons QB Steve Bartkowski's pass, the 5th turnover of the day for Atlanta. The Eagles then moved the ball to Atlanta's 15-yard line, but with 8:16 to go, linebacker Fulton Kuykendall recovered a fumble from fullback Mike Hogan on the 13. A few plays later, faced with second down and 10 on the 26, Bartkowski launched a deep pass to Wallace Francis, who was tightly covered by defensive back Herm Edwards. Both players went up for the ball and came down with it, resulting in a simultaneous catch between each of them. Under NFL rules, a simultaneous catch goes to the receiver, so Atlanta kept the ball and gained 49 yards in what turned out to be a decisive play. Three plays later, Bartkowski found tight end Jim Mitchell wide open in the end zone for a 20-yard touchdown pass, cutting the score to 13–7 at 4:56.

The Eagles went three-and-out on their next possession and had to punt ball back to the Falcons. Franklin tackled Ryckman for a 5-yard loss on the return, but committed a 15-yard facemask penalty in the process, giving Atlanta the ball on their 49-yard line. After 5 plays, Atlanta had moved only 12 yards. Faced with a crucial 3rd and 10 situation, Bartkowski went deep to Francis again, this time connecting with the receiver as he evaded safety Randy Logan to score on a 37-yard touchdown completion. With Mazzetti's extra point, the Falcons took their first lead of the game, 14–13, with 1:37 left in the game.

The Eagles had one last shot to win the game as Jaworski completed four passes to get them to Atlanta's 16-yard line with 13 seconds remaining, but Michel missed a 34-yard field goal attempt and the Falcons ran out the rest of the clock.

Bartkowski completed 18/32 passes for 243 yards and two touchdowns, with two interceptions. His top target was Francis, who caught 6 passes for 135 yards and a touchdown. Jaworski completed 19/35 passes for 190 yards and a touchdown. The Eagles leading receiver was Smith, who caught 7 passes for 108 yards. This was and to this day remains the only playoff game to feature two Polish-born starting quarterbacks (Bartkowski and Jaworski were born in the USA of Polish descent). Michel was released by the Eagles in the offseason after this game and never played in the NFL again.

This was the first postseason meeting between the Eagles and Falcons.

==== AFC: Houston Oilers 17, Miami Dolphins 9 ====
Houston Oilers vs. Miami Dolphins – Game summary

Quarter	1	2	3	4	Total
Oilers	7	0	0	10	17
Dolphins	7	0	0	2	9

at Miami Orange Bowl, Miami, Florida

- Game time: 4:00 p.m. EST
- Game attendance: 70,036
- Referee: Dick Jorgensen
- TV announcers (NBC): Dick Enberg and Len Dawson

Game information

First quarter

- MIA – Andre Tillman 13-yard pass from Bob Griese (Garo Yepremian kick). Dolphins 7–0.
- HOU – Tim Wilson 13-yard pass from Dan Pastorini (Toni Fritsch kick). Tied 7–7.

Second quarter

- No scoring plays.

Third quarter

- No scoring plays.

Fourth quarter

- HOU – Toni Fritsch 35-yard field goal. Oilers 10–7.
- HOU – Earl Campbell 1-yard run (Toni Fritsch kick). Oilers 17–7.
- MIA – Safety, Dan Pastorini ran out of the end zone. Oilers 17–9.

Top passers

- HOU – Dan Pastorini – 20/29, 306 yards, TD
- MIA – Bob Griese – 11/28, 114 yards, TD, 2 INT

Top rushers

- HOU – Earl Campbell – 26 rushes, 84 yards, TD
- MIA – Leroy Harris – 9 rushes, 43 yards

Top receivers

- HOU – Mike Barber – 4 receptions, 112 yards
- MIA – Duriel Harris – 4 receptions, 42 yards

Quarterback Dan Pastorini led the Oilers to an upset victory by passing for 306 yards. Houston outgained the Dolphins in total yards, 455-209, and forced 5 turnovers while only losing one on their end.

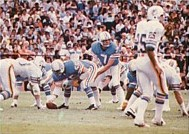
Pastorini calling a play during the 1978 AFC wild card game

Miami managed to keep Houston running back Earl Campbell well contained in the first half, limiting him to just 16 yards on 13 carries, but they were unable to handle the passing attack of Pastorini, who completed 16 of 21 passes for 261 yards during that time. Meanwhile, Dolphins quarterback Bob Griese completed just 6 of 16 passes in the first two quarters.

The Dolphins scored first after Earnie Rhone recovered a fumbled punt from Robert Woods at the Houston 21-yard line, setting up quarterback Bob Griese's 13-yard touchdown pass to tight end Andre Tillman. However, the Oilers responded with an 11-play, 71-yard drive in which Pastorini completed 6 of 7 passes for 66 yards, the last one a 13-yard touchdown pass to running back Tim Wilson. Neither team scored again until the fourth quarter, despite several chances. In the second quarter, Pastorini completed a 55-yard pass to tight end Mike Barber on the Dolphins 9-yard line, but the drive ended with no points when Toni Fritsch's 28-yard field goal attempt was blocked by linebacker Kim Bokamper. The Oilers later drove to the Dolphins red zone with 14 seconds left in the half. On the next play, Pastorini completed a pass to Ken Burrough, but he was tackled short of the end zone and the clock ran out before the team could spike the ball to stop it.

In the third quarter, Miami blew a chance to take then lead when Garo Yepremian drove a 38-yard field goal attempt wide left. In the final period, Toni Fritsch made a 35-yard field goal to give the Oilers a 10-7 lead. Then linebacker Gregg Bingham intercepted a pass from Griese and returned it 4 yards to midfield. Campbell finally managed to get into gear with a 20-yard run on the ensuing drive, and eventually finished it off with a 1-yard rushing touchdown. The Dolphins closed out the scoring, but only when Pastorini ran out of the end zone for an intentional safety to run out the clock.

Despite his poor first half, Campbell finished the game with 84 rushing yards and a 13-yard reception. Wilson rushed for 76 yards and caught 5 passes for 40. Barber had 112 yards on 4 receptions, while Burroughs caught 6 passes for 103. Griese finished the game just 11/28 for 114 yards, with a touchdown and two interceptions.

This was the first postseason meeting between the Oilers and Dolphins.

== Divisional round ==
=== Saturday, December 30, 1978 ===
==== AFC: Pittsburgh Steelers 33, Denver Broncos 10 ====
Denver Broncos vs. Pittsburgh Steelers – Game summary

Quarter	1	2	3	4	Total
Broncos	3	7	0	0	10
Steelers	6	13	0	14	33

at Three Rivers Stadium, Pittsburgh, Pennsylvania

- Game time: 12:30 p.m. EST
- Game attendance: 48,923
- Referee: Gene Barth
- TV announcers (NBC): Dick Enberg and Merlin Olsen

Game information

First quarter

- DEN – Jim Turner 37-yard field goal. Broncos 3–0.
- PIT – Franco Harris 1-yard run (kick failed). Steelers 6–3.

Second quarter

- PIT – Franco Harris 18-yard run (Roy Gerela kick). Steelers 13–3.
- PIT – Roy Gerela 24-yard field goal. Steelers 16–3.
- DEN – Dave Preston 3-yard run (Jim Turner kick). Steelers 16–10.
- PIT – Roy Gerela 27-yard field goal. Steelers 19–10.

Third quarter

- No scoring plays.

Fourth quarter

- PIT – John Stallworth 45-yard pass from Terry Bradshaw (Roy Gerela kick). Steelers 26–10.
- PIT – Lynn Swann 38-yard pass from Terry Bradshaw (Roy Gerela kick). Steelers 33–10.

Top passers

- DEN – Norris Weese – 8/16, 118 yards
- PIT – Terry Bradshaw – 16/29, 272 yards, 2 TD, INT

Top rushers

- DEN – Norris Weese – 4 rushes, 43 yards
- PIT – Franco Harris – 24 rushes, 105 yards, 2 TD

Top receivers

- DEN – Jack Dolbin – 4 receptions, 77 yards
- PIT – John Stallworth – 10 receptions, 156 yards, TD

The Steelers dominated the Broncos by gaining 425 yards of total offense, and dominated Denver starting quarterback Craig Morton so effectively that his team gained just 49 yards on their first five possessions before he was replaced by Norris Weese in the second quarter, who ended up getting sacked 5 times.

After Denver scored first on a field goal, Pittsburgh responded by driving 66 yards in 8 plays to score on running back Franco Harris' 1-yard touchdown run, giving the team a 6-3 lead after Roy Gerela missed the extra point. Then on the Steelers' next drive, Harris ran 18 yards to the end zone for his second touchdown. In the second quarter, the Steelers increased their lead to 16-3 with Gerela's 24-yard field goal. However, linebacker Tom Jackson later recovered a fumble from Pittsburgh quarterback Terry Bradshaw on the Steelers 49-yard line, where the Broncos went on to score on Dave Preston's 3-yard touchdown run that made the score 16-10. The Steelers responded with Gerela's second field goal of the day to take a 19-10 lead going into halftime.

In the third quarter, Denver mounted their most promising drive of the day, advancing the ball 73 yards. But it ended with no points when Joe Greene blocked Jim Turner's 29-yard field goal attempt. In the fourth quarter, Bradshaw threw two touchdowns, the first a 45-yarder to wide receiver John Stallworth. Then Dennis Winston recovered a fumble from Denver's Rick Upchurch on the ensuing kickoff, setting up Bradshaw's 38-yard touchdown pass. to wide receiver Lynn Swann.

Bradshaw completed 16 of 29 passes for 272 yards and 2 touchdowns, Stallworth had 10 receptions for 156 yards and a touchdown, and Harris rushed for 105 yards and 2 touchdowns.

This was the second postseason meeting between the Broncos and Steelers. Denver won the first meeting last year.

Previous playoff games
Denver leads 1–0 in all-time playoff games

1977

Pittsburgh Steelers 21 @ Denver Broncos 34

1977 AFC Divisional playoffs

==== NFC: Dallas Cowboys 27, Atlanta Falcons 20 ====
Atlanta Falcons vs. Dallas Cowboys – Game summary

Quarter	1	2	3	4	Total
Falcons	7	13	0	0	20
Cowboys	10	3	7	7	27

at Texas Stadium, Irving, Texas

- Game time: 4:00 p.m. EST
- Game attendance: 60,338
- Referee: Cal Lepore
- TV announcers (CBS): Pat Summerall and Tom Brookshier

Game information

First quarter

- DAL – Rafael Septién 34-yard field goal. Cowboys 3–0.
- ATL – Bubba Bean 14-yard run (Tim Mazzetti kick). Falcons 7–3.
- DAL – Scott Laidlaw 13-yard run (Rafael Septién kick). Cowboys 10–7.

Second quarter

- ATL – Tim Mazzetti 42-yard field goal. Tied 10–10.
- DAL – Rafael Septién 48-yard field goal. Cowboys 13–10.
- ATL – Wallace Francis 17-yard pass from Steve Bartkowski (Tim Mazzetti kick). Falcons 17–13.
- ATL – Tim Mazzetti 22-yard field goal. Falcons 20–13.

Third quarter

- DAL – Jackie Smith 2-yard pass from Danny White (Rafael Septién kick). Tied 20–20.

Fourth quarter

- DAL – Scott Laidlaw 1-yard run (Rafael Septién kick). Cowboys 27–20.

Top passers

- ATL – Steve Bartkowski – 8/23, 95 yards, TD, 3 INT
- DAL – Roger Staubach – 10/20, 127 yards, TD, INT

Top rushers

- ATL – Bubba Bean – 17 rushes, 72 yards, TD
- DAL – Scott Laidlaw – 17 rushes, 66 yards, 2 TD

Top receivers

- ATL – Wallace Francis – 6 receptions, 66 yards, TD
- DAL – Drew Pearson – 4 receptions, 75 yards

After losing three fumbles and their starting quarterback due to injury in the first half, Dallas rallied back from a 7-point deficit with two touchdowns in the second half to secure the win.

Cowboys quarterback Roger Staubach converted a 3rd and 16 with a 39-yard completion to Drew Pearson as he led the team 57 yards in 12 plays score on their opening drive with a 34-yard field goal by Rafael Septién. Atlanta responded by driving 78 yards in 8 plays to take a 7-3 lead with Bubba Bean's 14-yard touchdown run. On the first play of the next possession, Staubach completed an 18-yard pass to tight end Jackie Smith. Three plays later, punter/reserve quarterback Danny White kept the drive going with a 12-yard run on a fake punt, and Scott Laidlaw ran for a 21-yard gain on the next play. Laidlaw eventually finished the 10-play, 76 yard drive with a 13-yard touchdown run, giving Dallas a 10-7 lead.

Atlanta had to punt on their next drive, but Butch Johnson muffed the kick and Tom Moriarty recovered the ball for the Falcons on the Dallas 25-yard line. Three plays later, Tim Mazzetti kicked a 42-yard field goal to tie the game at 10 roughly a minute into the second quarter. Dallas responded by driving 46 yards in 10 plays to take a 13-10 lead with a 48-yard field goal from Septién. But Atlanta got a big break on the ensuing kickoff when a 15-yard personal foul penalty against Dallas turned Dennis Pearson's 36-yard return into a 51-yard gain and gave them the ball on the Cowboys 40-yard line. From there, Atlanta scored on a 7-play drive, the last one a 17-yard touchdown pass from Steve Bartkowski to Wallace Francis that gave the team a 17-13 lead. Dallas barely avoided disaster when they muffed the ensuing kickoff, managing to recover the ball in the end zone for a touchback. But on the next play, Tony Dorsett lost a fumble while being hit by Greg Brezina, and Falcons linebacker Dewey McClain recovered it on the Cowboys 30-yard line. The Dallas defense managed to keep Atlanta out of the end zone, but Mazzetti kicked a 22-yard field goal to give them a 20-13 lead with 50 seconds left in the half. Dallas then drove to the Falcons 35-yard line, but lost the ball on a fumbled snap in shotgun formation that was recovered by defensive back Tom Pridemore. To make matters worse for Dallas, Staubach was knocked out of the game on the drive due to a massive hit from linebacker Robert Pennywell, though they did manage to prevent Atlanta from scoring as a result of an interception by Randy Hughes.

Atlanta had to punt from deep in their territory on their opening drive of the second half, and Johnson returned it to the Falcons 49-yard line. Still, Dallas was unable to capitalize, as they lost their fourth turnover of the day, this time a pass from White that was intercepted by Rolland Lawrence. Still, Dallas quickly forced a punt and again achieved excellent field position as Johnson returned it 8 yards to their 46-yard line. Then White completed passes to Billy Joe Dupree and Laidlaw for gains of 24 and 15 yards as the team drove 54 yards in seven plays to tie the game, 20-20, on his 2-yard touchdown pass to Smith. Later on, Bartkowski threw a pass that was deflected by Cliff Harris and intercepted by defensive back Aaron Kyle, who returned it 15 yards to the Falcons 41-yard line.

On the next play, the last of the third quarter, Dupree took the ball on an end around play and ran for a 20-yard gain. Still, the Falcons defense managed to prevent a score, stopping the Cowboys over the next three plays before Septién missed a 31-yard field goal attempt. The next time Dallas got the ball, a bad Falcons punt gave them a first down on the Atlanta 30-yard line, where they drove to a 27-20 lead on Laidlaw's 1-yard touchdown run. The Cowboys defense then went on to dominate Atlanta for the rest of the game. After a punt from each team, Atlanta mounted a drive inside the Dallas 35-yard line, only to lose the ball when failing to convert a 4th and 1. The Falcons forced a punt and got one last chance to drive for a tying touchdown with 59 seconds and all three timeouts left. But Harris put an end to that prospect by intercepting a pass from Bartkowski and returning it 22 yards.

Laidlaw rushed for 66 yards and 2 touchdowns, while also catching a pass for 15. Dorsett rushed for 65 yards. Dupree caught 5 passes for 59 yards and rushed for 20. Bartkowski was held to just 8 of 23 completions for 95 yards, with 1 touchdown and 3 interceptions.

This was the first postseason meeting between the Falcons and Cowboys.

=== Sunday, December 31, 1978 ===
==== AFC: Houston Oilers 31, New England Patriots 14 ====
Houston Oilers vs. New England Patriots – Game summary

Quarter	1	2	3	4	Total
Oilers	0	21	3	7	31
Patriots	0	0	7	7	14

at Foxboro Stadium, Foxborough, Massachusetts

- Game time: 1:00 p.m. EST
- Game attendance: 60,881
- Referee: Gordon McCarter
- TV announcers (NBC): Charlie Jones and Len Dawson

Game information

First quarter

- No scoring plays.

Second quarter

- HOU – Ken Burrough 71-yard pass from Dan Pastorini (Toni Fritsch kick). Oilers 7–0.
- HOU – Mike Barber 19-yard pass from Dan Pastorini (Toni Fritsch kick). Oilers 14–0.
- HOU – Mike Barber 13-yard pass from Dan Pastorini (Toni Fritsch kick). Oilers 21–0.

Third quarter

- HOU – Toni Fritsch 30-yard field goal. Oilers 24–0.
- NE – Harold Jackson 24-yard pass from Andy Johnson (David Posey kick). Oilers 24–7.

Fourth quarter

- HOU – Earl Campbell 2-yard run (Toni Fritsch kick). Oilers 31–7.
- NE – Russ Francis 24-yard pass from Tom Owen (David Posey kick). Oilers 31–14.

Top passers

- HOU – Dan Pastorini – 12/15, 200 yards, 3 TD, INT
- NE – Tom Owen – 12/22, 144 yards, 2 TD, INT

Top rushers

- HOU – Earl Campbell – 27 rushes, 118 yards, TD
- NE – Sam Cunningham – 10 rushes, 42 yards

Top receivers

- HOU – Ken Burrough – 3 receptions, 91 yards, TD
- NE – Russ Francis – 8 receptions, 101 yards, TD

Quarterback Dan Pastorini led the Oilers to a victory by throwing for 200 yards and three touchdowns, while running back Earl Campbell rushed for 118 yards and a score.

After a scoreless first quarter, Houston completely took over the game. Houston receiver Ken Burrough caught a pass from Pastorini at the Pats 40-yard, broke through coverage from Mike Haynes, and took off for a 71-yard touchdown reception. Raymond Clayborn's 47-yard kickoff return gave the Patriots a chance to strike back, but two plays later, Steve Grogan's pass on a flea flicker play was intercepted by Mike Reinfeldt on the Oilers 1-yard line. Aided by an unnecessary roughness penalty that gave them a first down after failing to convert a 3rd down on their own 7-yard line, Houston drove 99 yards to score on Pastorini's 19-yard touchdown pass to tight end Mike Barber. Again, the Patriots seemed ready to respond, driving to the Oilers 23-yard line, but again they came up short due to Reinfeldt, who intercepted another pass from Grogan to end the drive. Reinfeldt's 27-yard return and another unnecessary roughness penalty against New England gave the Oilers a first down on the Patriots 49-yard line. Pastorini completed a 22-yard pass to Barber, and eventually got his team a 21-0 lead with a 13-yard touchdown pass to Barber at the end of the possession.

Pastorini finished the first half with 10 of 12 completions for 184 yards and 3 touchdowns. He threw only two passes in the second half, both completions. Meanwhile, Grogan was benched with 18 seconds left in the half, having completed only 3 of 12 passes for 38 yards.

A 30-yard field goal by Toni Fritsch gave the Oilers a 24-0 third quarter lead before New England managed a comeback. First they drove 75 yards to score on Andy Johnson's 24-yard halfback option play pass to receiver Harold Jackson. Then in the fourth quarter, they took advantage of a short field due to a poor punt by Cliff Parsley, scoring on Tom Owen's 24-yard touchdown pass to tight end Russ Francis that cut their deficit to 24-14. However, their efforts were dashed on their drive when linebacker Gregg Bingham intercepted an Owen pass and returned it 19 yards to the Patriot 18-yard line, setting up Campbell's 2-yard touchdown run to put the game away.

Francis caught 8 passes for 101 yards and a touchdown.

This was the home postseason debut of the Patriots in their history, and their only playoff loss at Foxboro Stadium. They did not lose another home playoff game again until 31 years later, seven years after Gillette Stadium opened.

This was the first postseason meeting between the Oilers and Patriots.

==== NFC: Los Angeles Rams 34, Minnesota Vikings 10 ====
Minnesota Vikings vs. Los Angeles Rams – Game summary

Quarter	1	2	3	4	Total
Vikings	3	7	0	0	10
Rams	0	10	14	10	34

at Los Angeles Memorial Coliseum, Los Angeles

- Game time: 5:00 p.m. EST
- Game attendance: 69,631
- Referee: Red Cashion
- TV announcers (CBS): Vin Scully, George Allen and Jim Brown

Game information

First quarter

- MIN – Rick Danmeier 42-yard field goal. Vikings 3–0.

Second quarter

- LA – Willie Miller 9-yard pass from Pat Haden (Frank Corral kick). Rams 7–3.
- LA – Frank Corral 43-yard field goal. Rams 10–3.
- MIN – Ahmad Rashad 1-yard pass from Fran Tarkenton (Rick Danmeier kick). Tied 10–10.

Third quarter

- LA – Cullen Bryant 3-yard run (Frank Corral kick). Rams 17–10.
- LA – Ron Jessie 27-yard pass from Pat Haden (Frank Corral kick). Rams 24–10.

Fourth quarter

- LA – Frank Corral 28-yard field goal. Rams 27–10.
- LA – Jim Jodat 3-yard run (Frank Corral kick). Rams 34–10.

Top passers

- MIN – Fran Tarkenton – 18/37, 219 yards, TD, 2 INT
- LA – Pat Haden – 15/29, 209 yards, 2 TD, INT

Top rushers

- MIN – Chuck Foreman – 13 rushes, 31 yards
- LA – Cullen Bryant – 27 rushes, 100 yards, TD

Top receivers

- MIN – Ahmad Rashad – 7 receptions, 84 yards, TD
- LA – Ron Jessie – 6 receptions, 108 yards, TD

After the game was tied 10–10 at halftime, the Rams dominated the second half by scoring 24 unanswered points. After the Vikings opened up the scoring with a field goal, Los Angeles marched 59 yards to score on quarterback Pat Haden's 9-yard touchdown pass to Willie Miller. However, Minnesota tied the game 6 seconds before halftime when quarterback Fran Tarkenton threw a 1-yard touchdown to Ahmad Rashad. From that point on, the Rams controlled the rest of the game. After Cullen Bryant gave Los Angeles the lead midway through the third period with a 3-yard touchdown, Haden threw a 27-yard touchdown to Ron Jessie. Meanwhile, the Vikings offense could only manage 58 yards of offense during the second half in what turned out to be Tarkenton's last game of a Hall of Fame career.

This was the fifth postseason meeting between the Vikings and Rams, with Minnesota winning all four previous meetings.

Previous playoff games
Minnesota leads 4–0 in all-time playoff games

1969

Los Angeles Rams 20 @ Minnesota Vikings 23

1969 NFL Western Conf. playoff

1974

Los Angeles Rams 10 @ Minnesota Vikings 14

1974 NFC Championship Game

1976

Los Angeles Rams 13 @ Minnesota Vikings 24

1976 NFC Championship Game

1977

Minnesota Vikings 14 @ Los Angeles Rams 7

1977 NFC Divisional playoffs

== Conference championships ==
=== Sunday, January 7, 1979 ===
==== AFC: Pittsburgh Steelers 34, Houston Oilers 5 ====
Houston Oilers vs. Pittsburgh Steelers – Game summary

Quarter	1	2	3	4	Total
Oilers	0	3	2	0	5
Steelers	14	17	3	0	34

at Three Rivers Stadium, Pittsburgh, Pennsylvania

- Game time: 1:00 p.m. EST
- Game weather: 27 °F (−3 °C), freezing rain
- Game attendance: 49,417
- Referee: Jim Tunney
- TV announcers (NBC): Curt Gowdy, John Brodie and Merlin Olsen

Game information

First quarter

- PIT – Franco Harris 7-yard run (Roy Gerela kick). Steelers 7–0.
- PIT – Rocky Bleier 15-yard run (Roy Gerela kick). Steelers 14–0.

Second quarter

- HOU – Toni Fritsch 19-yard field goal. Steelers 14–3.
- PIT – Lynn Swann 29-yard pass from Terry Bradshaw (Roy Gerela kick). Steelers 21–3.
- PIT – John Stallworth 17-yard pass from Terry Bradshaw (Roy Gerela kick). Steelers 28–3.
- PIT – Roy Gerela 37-yard field goal. Steelers 31–3.

Third quarter

- PIT – Roy Gerela 22-yard field goal. Steelers 34–3.
- HOU – Safety, Ted Washington tackled Rocky Bleier in the end zone. Steelers 34–5.

Fourth quarter

- No scoring plays.

Top passers

- HOU – Dan Pastorini – 12/26, 96 yards, 5 INT
- PIT – Terry Bradshaw – 11/19, 200 yards, 2 TD, 2 INT

Top rushers

- HOU – Earl Campbell – 22 rushes, 62 yards
- PIT – Franco Harris – 20 rushes, 51 yards, TD

Top receivers

- HOU – Rich Caster – 5 receptions, 44 yards
- PIT – Lynn Swann – 4 receptions, 98 yards, TD

On a wet, slick, and slippery field, the Steelers dominated the Oilers by forcing 9 turnovers and only allowing 5 points. Pittsburgh took the early lead by driving 57 yards to score on running back Franco Harris' 7-yard touchdown run. Then, linebacker Jack Ham recovered a fumble at the Houston 17-yard line, which led to running back Rocky Bleier's 15-yard rushing touchdown.

In the second quarter, a 19-yard field goal by Oilers kicker Toni Fritsch cut the score 14–3, but then the Steelers scored 17 points during the last 48 seconds of the second quarter. First, Houston running back Ronnie Coleman lost a fumble, and moments later Pittsburgh wide receiver Lynn Swann caught a 29-yard touchdown reception. Then Johnnie Dirden fumbled the ensuing kickoff, which led to Steelers wide receiver John Stallworth's 17-yard reception. After the Oilers got the ball back, Coleman fumbled again, and Roy Gerela kicked a field goal to increase Pittsburgh's lead, 31–3. Houston never posed a threat for the rest of the game as they turned over the ball four times in their six second-half possessions.

This was the first postseason meeting between the Oilers and Steelers.

==== NFC: Dallas Cowboys 28, Los Angeles Rams 0 ====
Dallas Cowboys vs. Los Angeles Rams – Game summary

Quarter	1	2	3	4	Total
Cowboys	0	0	7	21	28
Rams	0	0	0	0	0

at Los Angeles Memorial Coliseum, Los Angeles

- Game time: 5:00 p.m. EST
- Game attendance: 67,470
- Referee: Ben Dreith
- TV announcers (CBS): Pat Summerall and Tom Brookshier

Game information

First quarter

- No scoring plays.

Second quarter

- No scoring plays.

Third quarter

- DAL – Tony Dorsett 5-yard run (Rafael Septién kick). Cowboys 7–0.

Fourth quarter

- DAL – Scott Laidlaw 4-yard pass from Roger Staubach (Rafael Septién kick). Cowboys 14–0.
- DAL – Billy Joe DuPree 11-yard pass from Roger Staubach (Rafael Septién kick). Cowboys 21–0.
- DAL – Thomas Henderson 68-yard interception return (Rafael Septién kick). Cowboys 28–0.

Top passers

- DAL – Roger Staubach – 13/25, 126 yards, 2 TD, 2 INT
- LA – Vince Ferragamo – 7/16, 130 yards, 2 INT

Top rushers

- DAL – Tony Dorsett – 17 rushes, 101 yards, TD
- LA – Cullen Bryant – 20 rushes, 52 yards

Top receivers

- DAL – Billy Joe DuPree – 3 receptions, 48 yards, TD
- LA – Willie Miller – 3 receptions, 96 yards

After a scoreless defensive struggle in the first half (Ram kicker Frank Corral missed two field goals), the Cowboys forced 5 second half turnovers that led to 28 points. With 9:11 left in the third quarter, Dallas safety Charlie Waters intercepted a pass and returned it to the Los Angeles 10-yard line. Five plays later, running back Tony Dorsett, who finished the game with 101 rushing yards, scored on a 5-yard touchdown run to give the Cowboys a 7–0 lead.

With about 4 minutes left in the period, the Rams mounted a threat when Jackie Wallace returned a punt at midfield to the Dallas 23-yard line. Three plays later at the Dallas 14, Jim Jodat was stopped cold on 4th and a foot by Randy White and Larry Bethea.

As the third quarter neared a close, Waters recorded another interception and returned it to the Rams' 20, setting up quarterback Roger Staubach's 4-yard touchdown pass to Scott Laidlaw 58 seconds into the final period. On Waters' interception, Pat Haden's throwing hand hit Randy White's helmet, breaking his thumb and knocking him out of the game.

At around the 8-minute mark in the 4th, Vince Ferragamo, Haden's replacement, hit Willie Miller on a 65-yard pass to the 10-yard line, but on first and goal Cullen Bryant fumbled (his first in 337 career carries), and Cowboys defensive end Harvey Martin recovered at the 11-yard line. Dallas then marched 89 yards, featuring a 53-yard run on first down by Tony Dorsett and scored on Billy Joe Dupree's 11-yard touchdown catch. Dorsett had 70 of the drive's 89 yards rushing alone.

The Cowboys closed out the scoring with 1:19 left in the game when linebacker Thomas Henderson intercepted a Ferragamo pass and returned it 68-yards for the final touchdown.

This game was the last playoff game at the Coliseum for the Rams until the 2017 season.

This was the fourth postseason meeting between the Cowboys and Rams, with Dallas winning two of the previous three meetings.

Previous playoff games
Dallas leads 2–1 in all-time playoff games

1973

Los Angeles Rams 16 @ Dallas Cowboys 27

1973 NFC Divisional playoffs

1975

Dallas Cowboys 37 @ Los Angeles Rams 7

1975 NFC Championship Game

1976

Los Angeles Rams 14 @ Dallas Cowboys 12

1976 NFC Divisional playoffs

== Super Bowl XIII: Pittsburgh Steelers 35, Dallas Cowboys 31 ==
Super Bowl XIII – Pittsburgh Steelers vs. Dallas Cowboys – Game summary

Quarter	1	2	3	4	Total
Steelers (AFC)	7	14	0	14	35
Cowboys (NFC)	7	7	3	14	31

at Orange Bowl, Miami, Florida

- Date: January 21, 1979
- Game attendance: 79,484
- Referee: Pat Haggerty
- TV announcers (NBC): Curt Gowdy, John Brodie and Merlin Olsen

This was the second Super Bowl meeting between the Steelers and Cowboys, where Pittsburgh won the only previous meeting.

Previous playoff games
Pittsburgh leads 1–0 in all-time playoff games

1975

Dallas Cowboys 17 vs. Pittsburgh Steelers 21

Super Bowl X
