= 1978 Atlanta Falcons season =

First playoff appearance for the Falcons

- Owner: Rankin M. Smith Sr.
- General manager: Eddie LeBaron
- Head coach: Leeman Bennett
- Home stadium: Fulton County Stadium

Results
- Record: 9–7
- Division place: 2nd NFC West
- Playoffs: Won Wild Card Playoffs (vs. Eagles) 14–13; Lost Divisional Playoffs (at Cowboys) 20–27

The 1978 Atlanta Falcons season was the Falcons' 13th season. After losing four of their first six games, Atlanta rebounded to win seven of their last ten, and their 9–7 record was the third best in a weak NFC. The NFC West runners-up thus not only secured their first-ever postseason berth in franchise history, but earned a home playoff game under the expanded ten team format.

Hosting the Philadelphia Eagles in their first ever playoff game, the Falcons scored two touchdowns in their final fourteen minutes to pull out a 14–13 win. In the divisional round, the Falcons were 14-point underdogs facing the Dallas Cowboys. Atlanta took a seven-point lead into halftime, but the Cowboys came back to take a 27–20 lead. In their final drive, the Falcons fell inches short of a first down on the Cowboys' 32-yard line, as Dallas got the ball and ran down the clock.

== NFL draft ==
1978 Atlanta Falcons draft
Round	Pick	Player	Position	College	Notes
1	13	Mike Kenn *	Offensive tackle	Michigan	
2	43	Steve Stewart	Linebacker	Minnesota	
3	70	Stan Waldemore	Guard	Nebraska	
4	95	Brian Cabral	Linebacker	Colorado	
5	125	Dennis Pearson	Wide receiver	San Diego State	
6	152	Rodney Parker	Wide receiver	Tennessee State	
7	167	Alfred Jackson	Wide receiver	Texas	
7	179	James Wright	Tight end	Texas Christian	
8	209	David Adkins	Linebacker	Ohio State	
8	216	David Williams	Offensive tackle	Tennessee–Martin	
9	236	Tom Pridemore	Safety	West Virginia	
10	257	Ricky Patton	Running back	Jackson State	
10	263	Ray Strong	Running back	UNLV	
11	293	Scooter Reed	Defensive back	Baylor	
12	320	Daria Butler	Linebacker	Oklahoma State	
Made roster * Made at least one Pro Bowl during career

== Personnel ==
=== Staff / Coaches ===
1978 Atlanta Falcons staff
Front office: Chairman of the board – Rankin M. Smith Sr.; President – Rankin M. Smith, Jr.; General manager – Eddie LeBaron; Director of player personnel – Tom Braatz; Head coaches: Head coach – Leeman Bennett; Offensive coaches: Quarterbacks – Dick Wood; Offensive backs – John North; Receivers – Ted Plumb; Offensive line – Bill Walsh	Defensive coaches: Defensive line – Jim Champion; Linebackers – Doug Shively; Defensive backs – Jerry Glanville

=== Roster ===
1978 Atlanta Falcons roster
Quarterbacks (QB): 10 Steve Bartkowski; 16 Scott Hunter; 14 June Jones; Running backs (RB): 44 Bubba Bean; 26 Mike Esposito; 40 George Franklin; 33 Ricky Patton; 24 Haskel Stanback; 25 Ray Strong; Wide receivers (WR): 89 Wallace Francis; 85 Alfred Jackson; 81 Dennis Pearson; 82 Billy Ryckman; Tight ends (TE): 88 Lewis Gilbert; 86 Jim Mitchell; 83 James Wright	Offensive linemen (OL): 78 Mike Kenn T; 73 Phil McKinnely T; 71 Marv Montgomery T; 53 Paul Ryczek C; 70 Dave Scott G; 68 R.C. Thielemann G; 57 Jeff Van Note C; Defensive linemen (DL): 72 Jim Bailey DT; 74 Wilson Faumuina DT; 77 Edgar Fields DE; 69 Mike Lewis DT; 75 Jeff Merrow DE; 79 Jeff Yeates DE	Linebackers (LB): 50 Greg Brezina OLB; 54 Fulton Kuykendall OLB; 56 Ron McCartney OLB; 52 Dewey McClain OLB; 55 Ralph Ortega MLB; 59 Robert Pennywell MLB; 58 Steve Stewart MLB; Defensive backs (DB): 38 Rick Byas CB; 36 Bob Glazebrook FS; 30 Ernie Jackson CB; 22 Rolland Lawrence CB; 45 Tom Moriarty SS; 27 Tom Pridemore FS; 28 Frank Reed SS; Special teams (ST): 6 John James P; 4 Tim Mazzetti K	Reserve: 61 Brent Adams T (IR); 66 Warren Bryant T (IR); 51 Brian Cabral LB (IR); 32 Ray Easterling S (IR); 87 Claude Humphrey DE (Ret.); 84 Alfred Jenkins WR (IR); —- Andy Spiva LB (IR); -- Garth TenNapel LB (IR); Rookies in italics

== Regular season ==
=== Schedule ===
Week	Date	Opponent	Result	Record	Venue	Attendance
1	September 3	Houston Oilers	**W** 20–14	1–0	Atlanta–Fulton County Stadium	57,328
2	September 10	at **Los Angeles Rams**	**L** 0–10	1–1	Los Angeles Memorial Coliseum	46,201
3	September 17	Cleveland Browns	**L** 16–24	1–2	Atlanta–Fulton County Stadium	56,648
4	September 24	at Tampa Bay Buccaneers	**L** 9–14	1–3	Tampa Stadium	58,073
5	October 1	New York Giants	**W** 23–20	2–3	Atlanta–Fulton County Stadium	47,765
6	October 8	at Pittsburgh Steelers	**L** 7–31	2–4	Three Rivers Stadium	48,202
7	October 15	Detroit Lions	**W** 14–0	3–4	Atlanta–Fulton County Stadium	51,172
8	October 22	at **San Francisco 49ers**	**W** 20–17	4–4	Candlestick Park	44,235
9	October 30	**Los Angeles Rams**	**W** 15–7	5–4	Atlanta–Fulton County Stadium	57,250
10	November 5	**San Francisco 49ers**	**W** 21–10	6–4	Atlanta–Fulton County Stadium	55,468
11	November 12	at **New Orleans Saints**	**W** 20–17	7–4	Louisiana Superdome	70,323
12	November 19	at Chicago Bears	**L** 7–13	7–5	Soldier Field	46,022
13	November 26	**New Orleans Saints**	**W** 20–17	8–5	Atlanta–Fulton County Stadium	55,121
14	December 3	at Cincinnati Bengals	**L** 7–37	8–6	Riverfront Stadium	25,336
15	December 10	Washington Redskins	**W** 20–17	9–6	Atlanta–Fulton County Stadium	54,176
16	December 17	at St. Louis Cardinals	**L** 21–42	9–7	Busch Memorial Stadium	40,022
Note: Intra-division opponents are in **bold** text.

=== Standings ===
NFC West
	W	L	T	PCT	DIV	CONF	PF	PA	STK
Los Angeles Rams^{(1)}	12	4	0	.750	4–2	10–2	316	245	W1
Atlanta Falcons^{(4)}	9	7	0	.563	5–1	8–4	240	290	L1
New Orleans Saints	7	9	0	.438	3–3	6–6	281	298	W1
San Francisco 49ers	2	14	0	.125	0–6	1–11	219	350	L1

== Game summaries ==
=== Week 1 ===
Week 1: Houston Oilers at Atlanta Falcons

Quarter	1	2	3	4	Total
Oilers	7	0	7	0	14
Falcons	0	14	3	3	20

at Fulton County Stadium • Atlanta, Georgia

- Date: September 3, 1978
- Game time: 1:00 p.m.
- Game attendance: 57,328
- Referee: Jerry Markbreit
- TV announcers (NBC): Dick Enberg and Merlin Olsen
- Pro-Football-Reference.com

Game information

Oilers

Falcons

- June Jones
  10/23, 104 Yds, TD
- Bubba Bean
  14 Rush, 55 Yds
- Bubba Bean
  3 Rec, 37 Yds, TD

Scoring summary

Quarter	Time	Drive			Team	Scoring information	Score	
Quarter	Time	Plays	Yards	TOP	Team	Scoring information	HOU	ATL
2					Falcons	Bean 38-yard touchdown reception from Jones, Steinfort kick good	7	7
2		—	—	—	Falcons	Moriarty recovered blocked punt in end zone, Steinfort kick good	7	14
3					Falcons	30-yard field goal by Steinfort	14	17
4					Falcons	48-yard field goal by Steinfort	14	20
"TOP" = time of possession. For other American football terms, see Glossary of American football.							14	20

=== Week 2 ===
Week 2: Atlanta Falcons at Los Angeles Rams

Quarter	1	2	3	4	Total
Falcons	0	0	0	0	0
Rams	0	3	0	7	10

at Los Angeles Memorial Coliseum • Los Angeles, California

- Date: September 10, 1978
- Game time: 4:00 p.m.
- Game attendance: 46,201
- Referee: Bob Frederic
- TV announcers (CBS): Vin Scully and George Allen
- Pro-Football-Reference.com

Game information

Falcons

- June Jones
  5/15, 38 Yds, INT
- Ricky Patton
  13 Rush, 24 Yds
- Ricky Patton
  3 Rec, 19 Yds

Rams

Scoring summary

Quarter	Time	Drive			Team	Scoring information	Score	
Quarter	Time	Plays	Yards	TOP	Team	Scoring information	ATL	LA
"TOP" = time of possession. For other American football terms, see Glossary of American football.							0	10

=== Week 3 ===
Week 3: Cleveland Browns at Atlanta Falcons – Game summary

Quarter	1	2	3	4	Total
Browns	0	17	0	7	24
Falcons	3	7	0	6	16

at Atlanta–Fulton County Stadium, Atlanta

- Date: September 17
- Game time: 1:00 p.m. EDT
- Game weather: 79 °F (26 °C), relative humidity 70%, round (wind) 6 mph (9.7 km/h)
- Game attendance: 56,648
- Referee: Gene Barth
- TV announcers (NBC): Jim Simpson (play–by–play) and Paul Warfield (color commentator)

Game information

First quarter

- ATL – Steinfort 24 yard field goal
  Falcons 3, Browns 0

Second quarter

- CLE – Cockroft 43 yard field goal
  Browns 3, Falcons 3
- CLE – Newsome 2 yard pass from Sipe (Cockroft kick)
  Browns 10, Falcons 3
- ATL – Stanback 15 yard rush (Steinfort kick)
  Browns 10, Falcons 10
- CLE – Rucker 27 yard pass from Sipe (Cockroft kick)
  Browns 17, Falcons 10

Third quarter

- No scoring plays

Fourth quarter

- ATL – Strong 2 yard rush (kick failed)
  Browns 17, Falcons 16
- CLE – Sipe 2 yard rush (Cockroft kick)
  Browns 24, Falcons 16

Top passers

- CLE – Brian Sipe 20/35, 219 yds, 2 TD
- ATL – Steve Bartkowski 7/15, 126 yds, 2 INT

Top rushers

- CLE – Mike Pruitt 15 carr, 65 yds
- ATL – Haskel Stanback 7 carr, 31 yds, 1 TD

Top receivers

- CLE – Dave Logan 5 rec, 63 yds
- ATL – Billy Ryckman 3 rec, 48 yds

Turnovers

- CLE – 3
- ATL – 4

=== Week 7 vs. Detroit Lions ===
- Referee: Ben Dreith
- Network: CBS
- Announcers: Vin Scully, George Allen and Jim Brown

Steve Bartkowski threw a 24-yard touchdown pass to Billy Ryckman early in the second quarter and Bubba Bean erupted for a 25-yard touchdown run in the final minutes of the game as the Falcons got a critical win to stay alive in the NFC Playoff hunt. The Falcons defense also played a part in their win with two brilliant goal line stands. It was the first home shutout in Falcons History. The Lions' woeful offense could produce only 22 rushing yards.

=== Week 8 vs San Francisco 49ers ===
Atlanta erased a 17–7 deficit in the final 5:38 of the game, beating San Francisco on Tim Mazzetti's last-second, 29-yard field goal. Steve Bartkowski directed the comeback, hitting a 71-yard bomb to set up a 21-yard Mazzetti field goal, completing a 59-yard scoring pass to Billy Ryckman with 1:52 remaining and then finding Tim Mitchell with a 19-yard reception to set up a winning kick. This game was broadcast by CBS with announcers Vin Scully, George Allen and Jim Brown at the game.

=== Week 9 ===
Week 9: Los Angeles Rams at Atlanta Falcons

Quarter	1	2	3	4	Total
Rams	0	7	0	0	7
Falcons	0	6	0	9	15

at Fulton County Stadium • Atlanta, Georgia

- Date: October 30, 1978
- Game time: 9:00 p.m.
- Game attendance: 57,250
- Referee: Cal Lepore
- TV announcers (ABC): Frank Gifford and Howard Cosell
- Pro-Football-Reference.com

Game information

Rams

Falcons

Scoring summary

Quarter	Time	Drive			Team	Scoring information	Score	
Quarter	Time	Plays	Yards	TOP	Team	Scoring information	LA	ATL
2					Falcons	21-yard field goal by Mazzetti	7	3
2					Falcons	37-yard field goal by Mazzetti	7	6
4					Falcons	30-yard field goal by Mazzetti	7	9
4					Falcons	26-yard field goal by Mazzetti	7	12
4					Falcons	37-yard field goal by Mazzetti	7	15
"TOP" = time of possession. For other American football terms, see Glossary of American football.							7	15

=== Week 10 vs. San Francisco 49ers ===
- Referee: Fred Silva
- TV Network: CBS
- Announcers: Frank Glieber and Johnny Unitas

Steve Bartkowski, who suffered a separate shoulder last Monday, ran for one touchdown and threw a 37-yard scoring pass to Wallace Francis as Atlanta spoiled the head coaching debutof the 49ers' Fred O'Connor who replaced the fired Pete McCulley on Tuesday. San Francisco's O.J. Simpson suffered a shoulder separation early in the second period. Simpson had carried 5 times for only 15 yards before the injury. Atlanta's win help keep their playoff hopes alive for a wild card berth at 6–4 the same record as the Cowboys and the Vikings.

== Postseason ==
=== NFC Wild Card Game ===
Atlanta Falcons 14, Philadelphia Eagles 13

Quarter	1	2	3	4	Total
Eagles	6	0	7	0	13
Falcons	0	0	0	14	14

at Atlanta–Fulton County Stadium, Atlanta, Georgia

- Date: December 24, 1978
- Game time: 12:30 p.m. EST
- Game attendance: 49,447
- Referee: Fred Silva
- TV announcers (CBS): Gary Bender and Hank Stram

The Falcons won their first playoff game in team history after they overcame a 13–0 deficit by scoring 2 touchdowns in the final 5 minutes of the game.

=== NFC Divisional Playoff ===
Dallas Cowboys 27, Atlanta Falcons 20

Quarter	1	2	3	4	Total
Falcons	7	13	0	0	20
Cowboys	10	3	7	7	27

at Texas Stadium, Irving, Texas

- Date: December 30, 1978
- Game time: 4:00 p.m. EST
- Game attendance: 60,338
- Referee: Cal Lepore
- TV announcers (CBS): Pat Summerall and Tom Brookshier

Dallas' "Doomsday Defense" limited Atlanta quarterback Steve Bartkowski to only 8 completions in 23 attempts and intercepted him 3 times en route to victory. After the Falcons led 20–13 at halftime, the Cowboys scored 14 unanswered points in the second half.
