= 1978 Dallas Cowboys season =

NFL team season

- Owner: Clint Murchison, Jr.
- General manager: Tex Schramm
- Head coach: Tom Landry
- Home stadium: Texas Stadium

Results
- Record: 12–4
- Division place: 1st NFC East
- Playoffs: Won Divisional Playoffs (vs. Falcons) 27–20; Won NFC Championship (at Rams) 28–0; Lost Super Bowl XIII (vs. Steelers) 31–35

The 1978 Dallas Cowboys season was their 19th in the National Football League (NFL). For the third consecutive season, the Cowboys finished in first place in the NFC East. The Cowboys scored 384 points, which ranked first in the league, while the defense only gave up 208 points, 3rd best in the league. Twice, the Cowboys appeared on Monday Night Football.

The Cowboys became the first franchise to appear in five Super Bowls. Their post season run included a comeback victory over the Atlanta Falcons 27–20. As well as a shut out of the Los Angeles Rams 28–0.

With their loss to Pittsburgh in Super Bowl XIII, they also became the first team to lose a Super Bowl after having won it the previous year.

== Draft ==
1978 Dallas Cowboys draft
Round	Pick	Player	Position	College	Notes
1	28	Larry Bethea	DE	Michigan State	
2	56	Todd Christensen *	RB	BYU	
3	84	Dave Hudgens	OT	Oklahoma	
4	110	Alois Blackwell	RB	Houston	
5	138	Rich Rosen	OG	Syracuse	
6	166	Harold Randolph	LB	East Carolina	
7	194	Tom Randall	DT	Iowa State	
8	222	Homer Butler	WR	UCLA	
9	250	Russ Williams	DB	Tennessee	
10	278	Barry Tomasetti	OT	Iowa	
11	306	Dennis Thurman *	CB	USC	
12	334	Lee Washburn	OG	Montana	
Made roster † Pro Football Hall of Fame * Made at least one Pro Bowl during career

=== Undrafted free agents ===
1978 undrafted free agents of note
Player	Position	College
Tim Abney	Defensive back	Lincoln
Terry Albritton	Defensive tackle	Stanford
Jef Allen	Quarterback	New Hampshire
Dave Barron	Linebacker	Tennessee
Steve Bernardo	Offensive Lineman	Wake Forest
Dave Kraayeveld	Defensive end	Milton
Joe Moreino	Defensive tackle	Idaho State

== Roster ==
Dallas Cowboys 1978 roster
Quarterbacks: 18 Glenn Carano; 12 Roger Staubach; 11 Danny White P; Running backs: 24 Alois Blackwell; 36 Larry Brinson; 33 Tony Dorsett; 35 Scott Laidlaw; 44 Robert Newhouse; 26 Preston Pearson; Wide receivers: 80 Tony Hill; 86 Butch Johnson; 88 Drew Pearson; 82 Robert Steele; Tight ends: 89 Billy Joe DuPree; 81 Jackie Smith	Offensive linemen: 61 Jim Cooper C/T; 67 Pat Donovan T; 62 John Fitzgerald C; 71 Andy Frederick T; 66 Burton Lawless G; 64 Tom Rafferty G; 60 Tom Randall G; 68 Herbert Scott G; 70 Rayfield Wright T; Defensive linemen: 76 Larry Bethea DE/DT; 63 Larry Cole DT; 72 Ed Jones DE; 79 Harvey Martin DE; 75 Jethro Pugh DT; 65 Dave Stalls DE; 54 Randy White DT	Linebackers: 53 Bob Breunig MLB; 59 Guy Brown OLB; 58 Mike Hegman OLB; 56 Thomas Henderson OLB; 57 Bruce Huther MLB; 50 D. D. Lewis OLB; Defensive backs: 31 Benny Barnes CB; 43 Cliff Harris FS; 42 Randy Hughes FS/SS; 25 Aaron Kyle CB; 32 Dennis Thurman CB; 46 Mark Washington CB; 41 Charlie Waters SS; Special teams: 1 Rafael Septién K	Reserve lists: 40 Todd Christensen RB (IR); 21 Doug Dennison RB (IR); 87 Jay Saldi TE (IR); 78 Dave Hudgens T (IR); 45 Kenny Randle CB (IR); -- Russ Williams S (IR); Rookies in italics 45 active, 6 inactive

== Regular season ==
The defending Super Bowl champions were again led by quarterback Roger Staubach. Staubach finished the season as the top rated passer in the NFL (84.9) by throwing 231 out of 413 completions for 3,190 yards and 25 touchdowns, with 16 interceptions. He also rushed for 182 yards and another touchdown. Wide receivers Drew Pearson and Tony Hill provided the deep passing threats, combining for 90 receptions, 537 yards, and 7 touchdowns. Tight end Billy Joe Dupree contributed 34 receptions for 509 yards and 9 touchdowns. Running back Tony Dorsett had another fine season, recording a total of 1703 combined rushing and receiving yards, and scoring a total of 9 touchdowns. Fullback Robert Newhouse and halfback Preston Pearson also contributed from the offensive backfield, combining for 1,326 rushing and receiving yards, while Newhouse also scored 10 touchdowns. The Cowboys also had a superb offensive line, led by Herbert Scott and 6-time Pro Bowler Rayfield Wright

The Cowboys' "Doomsday Defense" finished the season as the top-ranked defense in the league against the run by only allowing 107.6 yards per game. Pro Bowl linemen Ed "Too Tall" Jones, Harvey Martin and Randy White anchored the line, while linebackers Bob Breunig, D. D. Lewis and Thomas "Hollywood" Henderson provided solid support. Their secondary, led by safeties Cliff Harris and Charlie Waters, along with cornerbacks Benny Barnes and Aaron Kyle, combined for 16 interceptions.

The Cowboys started the regular season slowly, winning only six of their first ten games. Both the offense and the defense played ineffectively, including giving up interceptions and fumbles. Dallas finished strong, winning their last six regular season games to post a 12–4 record.

In the aftermath of the season, NFL Films produced its annual highlight reel as it does for every NFL team. Notable of the highlight reel was the title "America's Team". It would come to be a label that would define the Dallas Cowboys for the rest of their history. However, the label is most remembered for the Cowboys of this era, appearing in three Super Bowls in four years.

=== Schedule ===
Week	Date	Opponent	Result	Record	Game Site	Attendance	Recap
1	September 4	Baltimore Colts	**W** 38–0	1–0	Texas Stadium	64,224	Recap
2	September 10	at **New York Giants**	**W** 34–24	2–0	Giants Stadium	73,265	Recap
3	September 17	at Los Angeles Rams	**L** 14–27	2–1	Los Angeles Memorial Coliseum	65,749	Recap
4	September 24	**St. Louis Cardinals**	**W** 21–12	3–1	Texas Stadium	62,760	Recap
5	October 2	at **Washington Redskins**	**L** 5–9	3–2	RFK Stadium	55,031	Recap
6	October 8	**New York Giants**	**W** 24–3	4–2	Texas Stadium	63,420	Recap
7	October 15	at **St. Louis Cardinals**	**W** 24–21 (OT)	5–2	Busch Memorial Stadium	48,991	Recap
8	October 22	**Philadelphia Eagles**	**W** 14–7	6–2	Texas Stadium	60,525	Recap
9	October 26	Minnesota Vikings	**L** 10–21	6–3	Texas Stadium	61,848	Recap
10	November 5	at Miami Dolphins	**L** 16–23	6–4	Orange Bowl	69,414	Recap
11	November 12	at Green Bay Packers	**W** 42–14	7–4	Milwaukee County Stadium	55,256	Recap
12	November 19	New Orleans Saints	**W** 27–7	8–4	Texas Stadium	57,920	Recap
13	November 23	**Washington Redskins**	**W** 37–10	9–4	Texas Stadium	64,905	Recap
14	December 3	New England Patriots	**W** 17–10	10–4	Texas Stadium	63,263	Recap
15	December 10	at **Philadelphia Eagles**	**W** 31–13	11–4	Veterans Stadium	64,667	Recap
16	December 17	at New York Jets	**W** 30–7	12–4	Shea Stadium	52,532	Recap

Division opponents are in bold text

=== Game notes ===
==== Week 1 ====
Team	1	2	3	4	Total
Colts(0-1)	0	0	0	0	0
• **Cowboys(1-0)**	0	21	14	3	38

- Date: September 4
- Location: Texas Stadium, Irving, Texas
- Game start: 8:00 p.m.(ET)
- Game attendance: 64,224
- Game weather: 87 °F (31 °C), wind 8 mph (13 km/h)
- Referee: Jim Tunney
- TV announcers (ABC): Frank Gifford, Howard Cosell, and Don Meredith

Scoring summary
2	DAL	Doug Dennison 1 yard run (Rafael Septién kick)	Cowboys 7–0
2	DAL	Tony Dorsett 91 yard pass from Roger Staubach (Rafael Septién kick)	Cowboys 14–0
2	DAL	Billy Joe DuPree 8 yard pass from Roger Staubach (Rafael Septién kick)	Cowboys 21–0
3	DAL	Drew Pearson 38 yard pass from Roger Staubach (Rafael Septién kick)	Cowboys 28–0
3	DAL	Jay Saldi 1 yard pass from Roger Staubach (Rafael Septién kick)	Cowboys 35–0
4	DAL	Rafael Septién 48 yard field goal	Cowboys 38–0

==== Week 2 ====
Team	1	2	3	4	Total
• **Cowboys (2-0)**	7	14	6	7	34
Giants (1-1)	0	7	10	7	24

- Date: September 10
- Location: Giants Stadium, East Rutherford, New Jersey
- Game start: 1:00 p.m. EST
- Game attendance: 73,265
- Game weather: 61 °F (16 °C), wind 14 mph (23 km/h)
- Referee: Fred Wyant
- TV announcers (CBS): Don Criqui, Tom Brookshier, and Sonny Jurgensen
- Source: Pro-Football-Reference.com

Scoring summary
1	DAL	DuPree 4-yard pass from Staubach (Septién kick)	Cowboys 7–0
2	DAL	Newhouse 2-yard run (Septién kick)	Cowboys 14–0
2	NYG	Dixon 4-yard pass from Pisarcik (Danelo kick)	Cowboys 14–7
2	DAL	Saldi 2-yard pass from Staubach (Septién kick)	Cowboys 21–7
3	NYG	Hammond 11-yard run (Danelo kick)	Cowboys 21–14
3	NYG	Danelo 42-yard field goal	Cowboys 21–17
3	DAL	Newhouse 1-yard run (kick failed)	Cowboys 27–17
4	DAL	Dorsett 3-yard run (Septién kick)	Cowboys 34–17
4	NYG	Doornik 1-yard run (Danelo kick)	Cowboys 34–24

==== Week 3 ====
Dallas Cowboys 14 at Los Angeles Rams 27

Quarter	1	2	3	4	Total
Cowboys (2-1)	0	7	0	7	**14**
**Rams (3-0)**	7	7	0	13	**27**

at Los Angeles Memorial Coliseum

- Date: Sunday, September 17, 1978
- Game time: 4:00pm(ET)
- Game weather: 67 °F (19 °C), relative humidity 77%, wind 10 mph (16 km/h)
- Game attendance: 65,749
- Referee: Chuck Heberling
- TV announcers (CBS): Pat Summerall and Tom Brookshier
- Pro-Football-Reference.com

Game information

**First quarter**

- Rams – John Cappelletti 1 yard rush (Frank Corral kick) – **7-0 Rams**

**Second quarter**

- Cowboys – Billy Joe DuPree 14 yard pass from Roger Staubach (Rafael Septién kick) – **7-7 tie**
- Rams – Ron Jessie 21 yard pass from Pat Haden (Frank Corral kick) – **14-7 Rams**

**Third quarter**

- No Score

**Fourth quarter**

- Cowboys – Tony Hill 18 yard pass from Roger Staubach (Rafael Septién kick) – **14-14 tie**
- Rams – Willie Miller 43 yard pass from Pat Haden (**Kick Failed**) – **20-14 Rams**
- Rams – Rod Perry 43 yard interception return (Frank Corral kick) – **27-14 Rams**

**Vegas Line**

- Dallas Cowboys -4.0

**Cowboys**

- **Passing**
- Roger Staubach 22/46, 246 Yds, 2 TD, 4 Int, 23 Lng
- **Rushing**
- Tony Dorsett 19 Att, 38 Yards, 0 TD, 13 Lng
- Robert Newhouse 7 Att, 34 Yards, 0 TD, 12 Lng
- Roger Staubach 2 Att, 25 Yards, 0 TD, 23 Lng
- **Receiving**
- Billy Joe DuPree 1 Rec, 14 Yds, 1 TD, 14 Lng
- Drew Pearson 1 Rec, 0 Yds, 0TD, 0 Lng
- Tony Hill 3 Rec, 41 Yds, 1 TD, 18 Lng
- Preston Pearson 5 Rec, 72 Yds, 0 TD, 21 Lng
- Tony Dorsett 6 Rec, 32 Yds, 0 TD, 12 Lng
- Jay Saldi 1 Rec, 5 Yds, 0 TD, 5 Lng

**Rams**

- **Passing**
- Pat Haden 14/25, 227 Yds, 2 TD, 2 Int, 45 Lng
- **Rushing**
- Cullen Bryant 20 Att, 61 Yards, 0 TD, 9 Lng
- John Cappelletti 15 Att, 39 Yards, 1 TD, 9 Lng
- **Receiving**
- Willie Miller 5 Rec, 68 Yds, 1 TD, 43 Lng
- Ron Jessie 7 Rec, 144 Yds, 1 TD, 45 Lng

The week-3 contest between the Rams and Cowboys was a hard-fought early season match-up between two rivals who hated each other. Twice the Rams led by a touchdown during the game, only to have the Cowboys come back to even up the score. With the game tied at 14–14 in the 4th quarter, QB-Pat Haden connected with WR-Willie Miller for a 43-yard touchdown reception to increase the Rams lead by 6-points. But, after the Rams FG-kicker (Frank Corral) missed the easy extra point the score remained 20–14, leaving the Rams desperately clinging to a 6-point lead against a Cowboys team well known for pulling-out close games late in the 4th-quarter.

However, the Rams defense was abruptly put an end by the Cowboys. Their hopes of engineering another last minute victory after DB-Rod Perry intercepted a pass from QB-Roger Staubach and returned it for a 43-yard TD to secure the Rams a 27–14 victory. In response to Perry's game winning interception return, over 65,000 fans that filled Los Angeles Memorial Coliseum that day simultaneously erupted into a bedlam of cheers. Then, what started off as a celebration developed into jeering and taunting of the Cowboys during the last few minutes of the game, by both the fans and quite a few of the Rams players too. This provoked a very rare angry response from Staubach, who was seen pointing his finger at the boisterous Rams players on the sideline, telling them that the Cowboys "will get them" the next time they meet each other.

==== Week 4 ====
St. Louis Cardinals 12 at Dallas Cowboys 21

Quarter	1	2	3	4	Total
Cardinals (0-4)	7	3	2	0	**12**
**Cowboys (3-1)**	0	7	0	14	**21**

at Texas Stadium

- Date: Sunday, September 24, 1978
- Game time: 4:00pm(ET)
- Game weather: 76 °F (24 °C), relative humidity 70%, wind 5 mph (8.0 km/h)
- Game attendance: 62,760
- Referee: Bob Frederic
- TV announcers (CBS): Pat Summerall, Sonny Jurgensen and Tom Brookshier
- Pro-Football-Reference.com

Game information
**First quarter**
- Cardinals – Mel Gray 9 yard pass from Jim Hart (Jim Bakken kick) – **7-0 STL**

**Second quarter**

- Cardinals – Jim Bakken 23 yard field goal – **10-0 STL**
- Cowboys – Tony Dorsett 7 yard rush (Rafael Septién kick) – **10-7 STL**

**Third quarter**

- Cardinals – Safety, Thaxton blocked punt out of end zone – **12-7 STL**

**Fourth quarter**

- Cowboys – Robert Newhouse 2 yard rush (Rafael Septién kick) – **14-12 Dal**
- Cowboys – Robert Newhouse 15 yard pass from Roger Staubach (Rafael Septién kick) – **21-12 Dal**

**Vegas Line**

- Dallas Cowboys -17.0

==== Week 5 ====
Dallas Cowboys 5 at Washington Redskins 9

Quarter	1	2	3	4	Total
Cowboys (3-2)	0	0	3	2	**5**
**Redskins (5-0)**	3	3	3	0	**9**

at Robert F. Kennedy Memorial Stadium

- Date: Monday, October 2, 1978
- Game time: 9:00pm(ET)
- Game weather: 68 °F (20 °C), relative humidity 58%, wind 13 mph (21 km/h)
- Game attendance: 55,031
- Referee: Gene Barth
- TV announcers (ABC): Frank Gifford, Howard Cosell, and Don Meredith
- Pro-Football-Reference.com

Game information
**First quarter**
- Wash – Mark Moseley 52 yard field goal – **Dal 0, Wash 3**

**Second quarter**

- Wash – Mark Moseley 19 yard field goal – **Dal 0, Wash 6**

**Third quarter**

- Dal – Rafael Septién 19 yard field goal – **Dal 3, Wash 6**
- Wash – Mark Moseley 27 yard field goal – **Dal 3, Wash 9**

**Fourth quarter**

- Dal – (DT)Randy White tackled (QB)Joe Theismann in end zone – **Dal 5, Wash 9**

**Vegas Line**

- Dallas Cowboys -4.5

==== Week 6 ====
Team	1	2	3	4	Total
Giants(3-3)	0	3	0	0	3
• **Cowboys(4-2)**	7	7	7	3	24

- Date: October 8
- Location: Texas Stadium, Irving, Texas
- Game start: 1:00 p.m.
- Game weather: 69 °F (21 °C) • Wind 10 mph (16 km/h)
- Referee: Pat Haggerty
- TV announcers (CBS): Pat Summerall and Tom Brookshier

Scoring summary
1	DAL	Tony Hill 17 yard pass from Roger Staubach (Rafael Septién kick)	Cowboys 7–0
2	NYG	Joe Danelo 37 yard field goal	Cowboys 7–3
2	DAL	Billy Joe DuPree 23 yard pass from Roger Staubach (Rafael Septién kick)	Cowboys 14–3
3	DAL	Tony Hill 30 yard pass from Roger Staubach (Rafael Septién kick)	Cowboys 21–3
4	DAL	Rafael Septién 22 yard field goal	Cowboys 24–3

==== Week 7 ====
Dallas Cowboys 24 at St. Louis Cardinals 21

Quarter	1	2	3	4	OT	Total
**Cowboys (5-2)**	0	7	14	0	3	**24**
Cardinals (0-7)	7	7	0	7	0	**21**

at Busch Stadium

- Date: Sunday, October 15, 1978
- Game time: 2:00pm(ET)
- Game weather: 48 °F (9 °C), relative humidity 67%, wind 11 mph (18 km/h)
- Game attendance: 48,991
- Referee: Don Wedge
- TV announcers (CBS): Lindsey Nelson and Paul Hornung
- Pro-Football-Reference.com

Game information
**First quarter**
- Cardinals – Jim Otis 2 yard rush (Jim Bakken kick) – **7-0 STL**

**Second quarter**

- Cowboys – Robert Newhouse 6 yard pass from Roger Staubach (Rafael Septién kick) – **7-7 tie**
- Cardinals – Jim Otis 1 yard rush (Jim Bakken kick) – **14-7 STL**

**Third quarter**

- Cowboys – Tony Hill 37 yard pass from Roger Staubach (Rafael Septién kick) – **14-14 tie**
- Cowboys – Tony Hill 6 yard pass from Roger Staubach (Rafael Septién kick) – **21-14 Dal**

**Fourth quarter**

- Cardinals – Wayne Morris 1 yard pass from Jim Hart (Jim Bakken kick) – **21-21 tie**

**Overtime**

- Cowboys – Rafael Septién 47 yard field goal – **24-21 Dal**

**Vegas Line**

- Dallas Cowboys -13.5

==== Week 8 ====
Philadelphia Eagles 7 at Dallas Cowboys 14

Quarter	1	2	3	4	Total
Eagles (4-4)	0	0	7	0	**7**
**Cowboys (6-2)**	0	14	0	0	**14**

at Texas Stadium

- Date: Sunday, October 22, 1978
- Game time: 2:00pm(ET)
- Game weather: 76 °F (24 °C), relative humidity 51%, wind 14 mph (23 km/h)
- Game attendance: 60,525
- Referee: Red Cashion
- TV announcers (CBS): Frank Glieber, Tom Matte, and Bill Mazer
- Pro-Football-Reference.com

Game information

**First quarter**

- No Score

**Second quarter**

- Cowboys – Robert Newhouse 1 yard rush (Rafael Septién kick) – **Dal 7, Eagles 0**
- Cowboys – Drew Pearson 11 yard pass from Roger Staubach (Rafael Septién kick) – **Dal 14, Eagles 0**

**Third quarter**

- Eagles – Keith Krepfle 34 yard pass from Ron Jaworski (Nick Mike-Mayer kick) – **Dal 14, Eagles 7**

**Fourth quarter**

- No Score

**Vegas Line**

- Dallas Cowboys -8.0

==== Week 9 ====
Minnesota Vikings 21 at Dallas Cowboys 10

Quarter	1	2	3	4	Total
**Vikings (5-4)**	14	7	0	0	**21**
Cowboys (6-3)	0	3	7	0	**10**

at Texas Stadium

- Date: Thursday, October 26, 1978
- Game time: 8:30pm(ET)
- Game weather: 61 °F (16 °C), relative humidity 58%, wind 11 mph (18 km/h)
- Game attendance: 61,848
- Referee: Fred Wyant
- TV announcers (ABC): Frank Gifford, Howard Cosell and Don Meredith
- Pro-Football-Reference.com

==== Week 10 ====
Dallas Cowboys 16 at Miami Dolphins 23

Quarter	1	2	3	4	Total
Cowboys (6-4)	0	3	6	7	**16**
**Dolphins (7-3)**	17	3	0	3	**23**

at Orange Bowl

- Date: Sunday, November 5, 1978
- Game time: 4:00pm(ET)
- Game weather: 70 °F (21 °C), relative humidity 60%, wind 9 mph (14 km/h)
- Game attendance: 69,414
- Referee: Gordon McCarter
- TV announcers (CBS): Pat Summerall and Tom Brookshier
- Pro-Football-Reference.com

Game information
**First quarter**
- Dolphins – Norm Bulaich 1 yard rush (Garo Yepremian kick) – **3-0 Miami**
- Dolphins – Delvin Williams 1 yard rush (Garo Yepremian kick) – **10-0 Miami**
- Dolphins – Garo Yepremian 45 yard field goal – **17-0 Miami**

**Second quarter**

- Cowboys – Rafael Septién 30 yard field goal – **17-3 Miami**
- Dolphins – Garo Yepremian 23 yard field goal – **20-3 Miami**

**Third quarter**

- Cowboys – Rafael Septién 39 yard field goal – **20-6 Miami**
- Cowboys – Rafael Septién 24 yard field goal – **20-9 Miami**

**Fourth quarter**

- Dolphins – Garo Yepremian 33 yard field goal – **23-9 Miami**
- Cowboys – Billy Joe DuPree 9 yard pass from Roger Staubach (Rafael Septién kick) – **23-16 Miami**

**Vegas Line**

- Miami Dolphins -1.0

==== Week 11 ====
Dallas Cowboys 42 at Green Bay Packers 14

Quarter	1	2	3	4	Total
**Cowboys (7-4)**	7	14	14	7	**42**
Packers (7-4)	7	0	0	7	**14**

at Milwaukee County Stadium

- Date: Sunday, November 12, 1978
- Game time: 4:00pm(ET)
- Game weather: 31 °F (−1 °C), humidity 73%, wind 14 mph (23 km/h), wind chill 21 °F (−6 °C)
- Game attendance: 55,256
- Referee: Jim Tunney
- TV announcers (CBS): Pat Summerall and Tom Brookshier
- Pro-Football-Reference.com

Game information

**First quarter**

- Packers – Barty Smith 1 yard rush (Chester Marcol kick) – **7-0 Packers**
- Cowboys – Robert Newhouse 14 yard rush (Rafael Septién kick) – **7-7 tie**

**Second quarter**

- Cowboys – Tony Dorsett 9 yard rush (Rafael Septién kick) – **14-7 Cowboys**
- Cowboys – Billy Joe DuPree 8 yard pass from Roger Staubach (Rafael Septién kick) – **21-7 Cowboys**

**Third quarter**

- Cowboys – Robert Newhouse 3 yard rush (Rafael Septién kick) – **28-7 Cowboys**
- Cowboys – Billy Joe DuPree 18 yard pass from Roger Staubach (Rafael Septién kick) – **35-7 Cowboys**

**Fourth quarter**

- Cowboys – Tony Dorsett 33 yard rush (Rafael Septién kick) – **42-7 Cowboys**
- Packers – Steve Odom 18 yard pass from Bobby Douglass (Chester Marcol kick) – **42-14 Cowboys**

**Vegas Line**

- Dallas Cowboys -7.0

**Cowboys**

**Passing**

- Roger Staubach 19/31, 200 Yds, 2 TD, 0 Int, 24 Lng

**Rushing**

- Tony Dorsett 23 Att, 149 Yds, 2 TD, 33 Lng
- Robert Newhouse 18 Att, 101 Yds, 2 TD, 14 Lng
- Scott Laidlaw 6 Att, 33 Yds, 0 TD, 10 Lng
- Alois Blackwell 6 Att, 29 Yds, 0 TD, 13 Lng

**Receiving**

- Butch Johnson 4 Rec, 56 Yds, 0 TD, 18 Lng
- Tony Hill 3 Rec, 41 Yds, 1 TD, 18 Lng
- Drew Pearson 3 Rec, 29 Yds, 0 TD, 21 Lng
- Preston Pearson 5 Rec, 35 Yds, 0 TD, 11 Lng
- Billy Joe DuPree 2 Rec, 26 Yds, 2 TD, 18 Lng
- Robert Newhouse 4 Rec, 37 Yds, 0 TD, 24 Lng
- Tony Dorsett 1 Rec, 16 Yds, 0 TD, 16 Lng

**Packers**

**Passing**

- David Whitehurst 3/16, 31 Yds, 0 TD, 1 Int, 0 Lng
- Bobby Douglass 3/5, 45 Yds, 1 TD, 1 Int, 0 Lng

**Rushing**

- Terdell Middleton 9 Att, 29 Yds, 0 TD, 13 Lng
- Jim Culbreath 3 Att, 14 Yds, 0 TD, 14 Lng
- Barty Smith 3 Att, 6 Yds, 1 TD, 6 Lng
- Bobby Douglass 1 Att, 17 Yds, 0 TD, 17 Lng

**Receiving**

- Rich McGeorge 3 Rec, 41 Yds, 0 TD, 16 Lng
- James Lofton 1 Rec, 12 Yds, 0 TD, 12 Lng
- Steve Odom 1 Rec, 18 Yds, 1 TD, 18 Lng

Team stats	Dal	GNB
First downs	32	9
Rush-yards-TDs	58–313–4	17–66–1
Net pass yards	224	76
Comp-Att-Yd-TD-INT	21-34-234-2-0	7-26-88-1-2
Sacked-yards	2–10	3–12
Total yards	537	142
Turnovers	2	3
Penalties-yards	9-80	6-41

==== Week 12 ====
Team	1	2	3	4	Total
Saints(5-7)	7	0	0	0	7
• **Cowboys(8-4)**	0	14	7	6	27

- Date: November 19
- Location: Texas Stadium, Dallas, Texas
- Game start: 1:00 p.m. EST
- Game weather: 53 °F (12 °C), wind 6 mph (9.7 km/h)
- Referee: Fred Silva
- TV announcers (CBS): Frank Glieber and Roman Gabriel
- Source: Pro-Football-Reference.com

Scoring summary
1	Saints	Chuck Muncie 1-yard run (Steve Mike-Mayer kick)	Saints 7–0
2	Cowboys	Tony Dorsett 2-yard run (Rafael Septién kick)	Tie 7–7
2	Cowboys	Roger Staubach 1-yard run (Rafael Septién kick)	Cowboys 14–7
3	Cowboys	Billy Joe DuPree 24-yard pass from Roger Staubach (Rafael Septién kick)	Cowboys 21–7
4	Cowboys	Rafael Septién 24-yard field goal	Cowboys 24–7
4	Cowboys	Rafael Septién 26-yard field goal	Cowboys 27–7

==== Week 13 ====
Washington Redskins 10 at Dallas Cowboys 37

Quarter	1	2	3	4	Total
Redskins (8-5)	0	0	3	7	**10**
**Cowboys (9-4)**	13	7	10	7	**37**

at Texas Stadium

- Date: Thursday, November 23, 1978
- Game time: 3:30pm(ET)
- Game weather: 61 °F (16 °C), relative humidity 88%, wind 7 mph (11 km/h)
- Referee: Dick Jorgensen
- TV announcers (CBS): Pat Summerall and Tom Brookshier
- Pro-Football-Reference.com

Game information
**Vegas Line**
- Dallas Cowboys -11.5

==== Week 14 ====
New England Patriots 10 at Dallas Cowboys 17

Quarter	1	2	3	4	Total
Patriots (10-4)	7	3	0	0	**10**
**Cowboys (10-4)**	3	0	7	7	**17**

at Texas Stadium

- Date: Sunday, December 3, 1978
- Game time: 4:00pm(ET)
- Game weather: 48 °F (9 °C), relative humidity 70%, wind 16 mph (26 km/h)
- Referee: Cal Lepore
- TV announcers (NBC): Dick Enberg and Merlin Olsen
- Pro-Football-Reference.com

Game information
**Vegas Line**
- Dallas Cowboys -6.5

==== Week 15 ====
Dallas Cowboys 31 at Philadelphia Eagles 13

Quarter	1	2	3	4	Total
**Cowboys (11-4)**	14	0	10	7	**31**
Eagles (8-7)	7	0	0	6	**13**

at Veterans Stadium

- Date: Sunday, December 10, 1978
- Game time: 1:00pm(ET)
- Game weather: 31 °F (−1 °C), relative humidity 51%, wind 18 mph (29 km/h), wind chill 19
- Referee: Gene Barth
- TV announcers (CBS): Pat Summerall and Tom Brookshier
- Pro-Football-Reference.com

Game information
**Vegas Line**
- Dallas Cowboys -4.5

==== Week 16 ====
Team	1	2	3	4	Total
• **Cowboys (12-4)**	7	3	13	7	30
Jets(8-8)	0	0	0	7	7

- Date: December 17
- Location: Shea Stadium • Flushing, New York
- Game start: 1:00 p.m. EST
- Game weather: 43 °F (6 °C), wind 23 mph (37 km/h)
- Referee: Ben Dreith
- TV announcers (CBS): Frank Glieber and Tom Matte

Scoring summary
1	DAL	Tony Dorsett 7-yard run (Rafael Septién kick)	Cowboys 7–0
2	DAL	Rafael Septién 22-yard field goal	Cowboys 10–0
3	DAL	Robert Newhouse 1-yard run (Rafael Septién kick)	Cowboys 17–0
3	DAL	Tony Dorsett 54-yard fumble return (kick failed)	Cowboys 23–0
4	NYJ	Jerome Barkum 9-yard pass from Matt Robinson (Pat Leahy kick)	Cowboys 23–7
4	DAL	Larry Brinson 8-yard run (Rafael Septién kick)	Cowboys 30–7

== Standings ==
NFC East
	W	L	T	PCT	DIV	CONF	PF	PA	STK
^{(2)} Dallas Cowboys	12	4	0	.750	7–1	9–3	384	208	W6
^{(5)} Philadelphia Eagles	9	7	0	.563	4–4	6–6	270	250	W1
Washington Redskins	8	8	0	.500	4–4	6–6	273	283	L5
St. Louis Cardinals	6	10	0	.375	3–5	6–6	248	296	W1
New York Giants	6	10	0	.375	2–6	5–9	264	298	L1

== Postseason ==
Round	Date	Opponent	Result	Game Site	Attendance	Recap
Wild Card	First Round Bye					
Divisional	December 30, 1978	Atlanta Falcons (4)	W 27–20	Texas Stadium	60,338	Recap
NFC Championship	January 7, 1979	at Los Angeles Rams (1)	W 28–0	Los Angeles Memorial Coliseum	67,470	Recap
Super Bowl	January 21, 1979	vs Pittsburgh Steelers (A 1)	L 31–35	Orange Bowl	79,484	Recap

=== NFC Divisional Playoff ===
Dallas Cowboys 27, Atlanta Falcons 20

Quarter	1	2	3	4	Total
Falcons	7	13	0	0	20
Cowboys	10	3	7	7	27

at Texas Stadium, Irving, Texas

- Date: December 30, 1978
- Game time: 4:00 p.m. EST
- Game weather: 38 °F (3 °C), relative humidity 97%, wind 15 mph (24 km/h), wind chill 29 °F (−2 °C)
- Game attendance: 60,338
- Referee: Cal Lepore
- TV announcers (CBS): Pat Summerall and Tom Brookshier

Game information
- Vegas Line: Cowboys -15.0
- Scoring
  - DAL – field goal Septién 34 DAL 3–0
  - ATL – Bean 14 run (Mazzetti kick) ATL 7–3
  - DAL – Laidlaw 13 run (Septién kick) DAL 10–7
  - ATL – field goal Mazzetti 42 10–10
  - DAL – field goal Septién 48 DAL 13–10
  - ATL – Francis 17 pass from Bartkowski (Mazzetti kick) ATL 17–13
  - ATL – field goal Mazzetti 22 ATL 20–13
  - DAL – Smith 2 pass from D. White (Septién kick) 20–20
  - DAL – Laidlaw 1 run (Septién kick) DAL 27–20

Dallas' "Doomsday Defense" limited Atlanta quarterback Steve Bartkowski to only 8 completions in 23 attempts and intercepted him 3 times en route to victory. After the Falcons led 20–13 at halftime, the Cowboys scored 14 unanswered points in the second half.

=== NFC Championship Game ===
Dallas Cowboys 28, Los Angeles Rams 0

Quarter	1	2	3	4	Total
Cowboys	0	0	7	21	28
Rams	0	0	0	0	0

at Los Angeles Memorial Coliseum, Los Angeles

- Date: January 7, 1979
- Game time: 5:00 p.m. EST
- Game weather: 56 °F (13 °C), relative humidity 77%, wind 8 mph (13 km/h)
- Game attendance: 67,470
- Referee: Ben Dreith
- TV announcers (CBS): Pat Summerall and Tom Brookshier
- Pro-Football-Reference.com

Game information
- Scoring

Third quarter

  - DAL – Tony Dorsett 5 yard run (Rafael Septién kick) – DAL 7–0

Fourth quarter

  - DAL – Scott Laidlaw 4 yard pass from Roger Staubach (Rafael Septién kick) – DAL 14–0
  - DAL – Billy Joe DuPree 11 yard pass from Roger Staubach (Rafael Septién kick) – DAL 21–0
  - DAL – Thomas Henderson 68 yard interception return (Rafael Septién kick) – DAL 28–0

Vegas Line

- Dallas Cowboys -3.5

Cowboys

- Passing
- Roger Staubach 13/25, 126 Yds, 2 TD, 2 Int, 23 Lng
- Rushing
- Tony Dorsett 17 Att, 101 Yards, 1 TD, 53 Lng
- Scott Laidlaw 10 Att, 20 Yards, 0 TD, 4 Lng
- Roger Staubach 3 Att, 7 Yards, 0 TD, 11 Lng
- Robert Newhouse 1 Att, 4 Yards, 0 TD, 4 Lng
- Receiving
- Billy Joe DuPree 3 Rec, 48 Yds, 1TD, 23 Lng
- Drew Pearson 2 Rec, 19 Yds, 0TD, 17 Lng
- Tony Hill 1 Rec, 9 Yds, 0TD, 9 Lng
- Preston Pearson 2 Rec, 12 Yds, 0TD, 17 Lng
- Tony Dorsett 2 Rec, 15 Yds, 0TD, 9 Lng

Rams

- Passing
- Pat Haden 7/19, 76 Yds, 0 TD, 3 Int, 18 Lng
- Vince Ferragamo 7/16, 130 Yds, 0 TD, 2 Int, 65 Lng
- Rushing
- Cullen Bryant 20 Att, 52 Yards, 0 TD, 11 Lng
- John Cappelletti 3 Att, 19 Yards, 0 TD, 10 Lng
- Pat Haden 2 Att, 20 Yards, 0 TD, 18 Lng
- Receiving
- Willie Miller 3 Rec, 96 Yds, 0 TD, 65 Lng
- Billy Waddy 2 Rec, 23 Yds, 0 TD, 14 Lng

After a scoreless first half, the Cowboys opened the floodgates in the second half while the "Doomsday Defense" kept top-seeded Rams off of the scoreboard by intercepting Pat Haden three times, including a late pick six by Thomas "Hollywood" Henderson, to help Dallas advance to their second straight Super Bowl. This would be the Cowboys' last playoff win wearing their navy blue uniforms until the 2022 season.

=== Super Bowl XIII ===
Dallas Cowboys 31, Pittsburgh Steelers 35

Quarter	1	2	3	4	Total
Steelers (AFC)	7	14	0	14	35
Cowboys (NFC)	7	7	3	14	31

at Orange Bowl, Miami, Florida

- Date: January 21, 1979
- Game attendance: 79,484
- Referee: Pat Haggerty
- TV announcers (NBC): Curt Gowdy, Merlin Olsen and John Brodie

Game information
- Scoring
- PIT – TD: John Stallworth 28-yard pass from Terry Bradshaw (Roy Gerela kick) 7–0 PIT
- DAL – TD: Tony Hill 39-yard pass from Roger Staubach (Rafael Septién kick) 7–7 tie
- DAL – TD: Mike Hegman 37-yard fumble return (Rafael Septién kick) 14–7 DAL
- PIT – TD: John Stallworth 75-yard pass from Terry Bradshaw (Roy Gerela kick) 14–14 tie
- PIT – TD: Rocky Bleier 7-yard pass from Terry Bradshaw (Roy Gerela kick) 21–14 PIT
- DAL – FG: Rafael Septién 27 yards 21–17 PIT
- PIT – TD: Franco Harris 22-yard run (Roy Gerela kick) 28–17 PIT
- PIT – TD: Lynn Swann 18-yard pass from Terry Bradshaw (Roy Gerela kick) 35–17 PIT
- DAL – TD: Billy Joe DuPree 7-yard pass from Roger Staubach (Rafael Septién kick) 35–24 PIT
- DAL – TD: Butch Johnson 4-yard pass from Roger Staubach (Rafael Septién kick) 35–31 PIT

Super Bowl XIII is frequently cited as one of the greatest Super Bowls ever played. In additions to Coaches Noll and Landry, 17 players would go on to enshrinement in the Pro Football Hall of Fame: 10 from Pittsburgh (Bradshaw, Harris, Swann, Stallworth, Webster, Greene, Lambert, Ham, Blount, and Shell), and 7 from Dallas (Staubach, Dorsett, Drew Pearson, Randy White, Rayfield Wright, Cliff Harris and Jackie Smith).

Much of the pregame hype surrounding Super Bowl XIII centered around Cowboys linebacker Thomas "Hollywood" Henderson. Henderson caused quite a stir before the NFC Championship Game by claiming that the Rams had "no class" and the Cowboys would shut them out. His prediction turned out to be very accurate; the Cowboys did shut them out, aided by Henderson's 68-yard interception return for a touchdown.

In the days leading up the Super Bowl, Henderson began talking about the Steelers in the same manner. He predicted another shutout and then made unfriendly comments about several Pittsburgh players. He put down the talent and the intelligence of Bradshaw, proclaiming "Bradshaw couldn't spell 'cat' if you spotted him the 'c' and the 'a'". But the Steelers refused to get into a war of words with Henderson. Greene responded by saying the Steelers didn't need to say they were the best, they would just go out on the field and "get the job done".

== Season recap ==
There was a lot of bitter feelings between the Dallas Cowboys and the LA Rams prior to their 1978 NFC Championship contest. Both the Cowboys and Vikings shared a common recent history of eliminating the LA Rams from the playoffs the last 5 seasons in a row. This consigned the Rams to being labeled "next year's champions" for most of the 1970s. So, when the undefeated (2–0) Cowboys traveled to Los Angeles to play the undefeated (2–0) Rams during week 3 of the 1978 regular season, the Rams were looking for blood. Not only did the Rams want to beat the Cowboys for a measure of revenge and early bragging rights, but they could use a victory over last year's Super Bowl champions to make a statement to the media and the rest of the league, "That 1978 was the year the Rams finally win a championship".

The week-3 contest between the Rams and Cowboys was a hard-fought, early-season match-up between two rivals who hated each other. Twice the Rams led by a touchdown only to have the Cowboys come back to even the score. With the game tied at 14–14 in the 4th quarter, QB-Pat Haden connected with WR-Willie Miller for a 43-yard touchdown reception to increase the Rams lead by 6 points. But, after the Rams FG-kicker (Frank Corral) missed the easy extra point the score remained 20–14, leaving the Rams desperately clinging to a 6-point lead against a Cowboys team well known for pulling-out close games late in the 4th-quarter.

However, the Rams defense abruptly put an end to the Cowboys hopes of engineering another last minute victory after DB-Rod Perry intercepted a pass from QB-Roger Staubach and returned it for a 43-yrd TD to secure the Rams 27–14 victory. In response to Perry's game winning interception return, over 65,000 fans that filled Los Angeles Memorial Coliseum that day simultaneously erupted into a bedlam of deafening cheers.The initially raucous celebration soon turned into jeering and taunting of the Cowboys in the final minutes of the game by both fans and several Rams players. The provocation elicited a rare display of anger from Staubach, who was seen pointing toward the boisterous Rams players on the sideline and telling them that the Cowboys would "get them" the next time the teams met.

The Cowboys returned to Los Angeles later that same season to play for the NFC Championship against the #1 seeded Rams. Both teams entered the playoffs with a 12–4 regular season record. Both teams defeated their first round opponents at home, which included a Rams 34–10 blowout over their other playoff nemesis, the Minnesota Vikings. And, as a result of that emotionally charged week-3 loss to the Rams, the Cowboys had to win the NFC Championship at the Coliseum in front of 67,470 hostile LA fans to earn a return trip to the Super Bowl to face the Pittsburgh Steelers, who had already won the AFC Championship against the Houston Oilers earlier that same day.

The stage was set for an epic NFC Championship match, and fueling the already combustible tensions was Cowboys LB-Thomas "Hollywood" Henderson. Earlier in the week, the national (and international) media had descended upon Thomas Henderson the day after the Cowboys' 27–20 1st-round playoff victory over the Atlanta Falcons. Thomas was more than eager to feed them some controversial meat to chew on. Thomas began the week by suggesting that the reason the Rams never went to a Super Bowl was because they had "no class" as a team and organization. Thomas later claimed the Rams are a team of chokers, and the Rams were going to choke again in their upcoming game against the Cowboys.

The much anticipated NFC Championship game between the Rams and Cowboys began as a scoreless defensive struggle for nearly three quarters of play, which included Rams kicker Frank Corral missing two field goal attempts in the first half. However, Dallas eventually broke the scoreless match wide open late in the 3rd quarter after forcing five 2nd-half turnovers that would eventually lead to a 28-point victory for the Cowboys. Earning them the opportunity to defend their NFL championship in Super Bowl XIII.

As usual, the Rams defense proved to be a tough nut to crack for the Cowboys offense, but, it all began to go horribly wrong for the Rams after Dallas safety Charlie Waters intercepted a pass and returned it to the Rams 10-yard line with 1:52 left in the 3rd-quarter. Five plays later, RB-Tony Dorsett (who finished the game with 101 rushing yards) scored on a 5-yard touchdown run to give the Cowboys a 7–0 lead. On the Rams next possession, Charlie Waters snatched his 2nd interception of the game, which quickly set-up Staubach's 4-yard TD pass to FB-Scott Laidlaw, making it a 14–0 contest early in the 4th quarter. On the play that Rams QB-Pat Haden threw his 2nd interception, Haden's passing hand collided with DT-Randy White's helmet as he released the ball. Resulting in a broken right thumb and sidelining Haden for the rest of the game.

With 8:30 left in the 4th-quarter and the Rams still down 14–0, backup QB-Vince Ferragamo hit WR-Willie Miller along the sideline for a 65-yard pass, giving the Rams a 1st-down on the Cowboys 10-yard line and a chance to get back in the game. However, on a 1st-and-goal the Rams RB-Cullen Bryant fumbled the handoff and DE-Harvey Martin quickly recovered the ball at the 11-yard line. From there, the Cowboys marched 89 yards to score their 3rd offensive touchdown which featured a 53-yard run by Tony Dorsett, that eventually set-up an 11-yard TD reception from Staubach to TE-Billy Joe Dupree.

With the Cowboys sitting comfortably on top a 21–0 lead late in the 4th quarter, the CBS cameras panned over to Thomas Henderson standing on the sideline with their TV microphone on. Seizing the opportunity, Thomas looked directly at the camera and told the several million viewers, "It's 21-0, the Rams are choking, and I ain't through yet.". On the very next Rams possession, Thomas Henderson intercepted Ferragamo's pass along the sideline with 1:19 left in the game and returned it 68 yards for the final touchdown. While the touchdown interception return, and prior comments may have impressed millions of viewers, it was Henderson's celebratory football finger roll over the goal post that angered many others.

Henderson's TD celebration was later deemed by the media as "adding insult to injury", which amused Henderson and the millions of Cowboys fans worldwide. However, it also increased the huge divide between those who were already fans of the Cowboys and the people who hated them. With the win over the Rams the Cowboys advanced to the Super Bowl for the third time in four years to play a rematch of Super Bowl X against the Pittsburgh Steelers that would ultimately determine "The Team of the Decade".

Thomas Henderson's "controversial" comments before and during the NFC Championship game accelerated his already skyrocketing "Hollywood" persona into that of a pop-cultural phenomenon. Thomas Henderson was later featured on the cover of Newsweek Magazine the week before the Super Bowl, and NBC anointed Henderson the "Muhammad Ali of the NFL" during the pre-game player introductions for Super Bowl XIII. ABC-TV decided to jump on the "Hollywood" Henderson band wagon by inviting him to compete on their popular annual Superstars competition immediately following the 28–0 victory over the Rams.

== Awards and records ==
- Led NFL in sacks
- Led NFL, fewest rushing yards allowed (1,721)
- Led NFL, most rushing yards (2,783)
- Led NFL, points scored (384)
- Roger Staubach, NFL passing leader
- Roger Staubach, NFC leader, touchdown passes (25)

=== Milestones ===
- Tony Dorsett, second consecutive 1,000 yard rushing season (finished season with 1,325 yards, third in NFL)

== Publications ==
- The Football Encyclopedia ISBN 0-312-11435-4
- Total Football ISBN 0-06-270170-3
- Cowboys Have Always Been My Heroes ISBN 0-446-51950-2
