= 1978 Los Angeles Rams season =

NFL team season

- Owner: Carroll Rosenbloom
- Head coach: Ray Malavasi
- Home stadium: Los Angeles Memorial Coliseum

Results
- Record: 12–4
- Division place: 1st NFC West
- Playoffs: Won Divisional Playoffs (vs. Vikings) 34–10; Lost NFC Championship (vs. Cowboys) 0–28

The 1978 Los Angeles Rams season was the team's 41st year with the National Football League and the 33rd season in Los Angeles. They improved on their 10–4 record from the previous season and finished 12–4.

The Rams began the regular season with seven straight victories and earned their sixth straight division title along with homefield advantage throughout the NFC playoffs, including wins over the Dallas Cowboys (27-14) and Pittsburgh Steelers (10-7), the teams that would ultimately face each other in Super Bowl XIII. After defeating the Minnesota Vikings 34–10 in the divisional round, Los Angeles hosted the NFC Championship Game, losing 28–0 at home in a rematch with the Cowboys.

== Offseason ==
Chuck Knox, who had coached the Rams for the previous five seasons, left the team after the 1977 season to join the Buffalo Bills.

In February, 1978, Rams owner Carroll Rosenbloom hired former Rams coach George Allen, with much media fanfare. Allen had coached the Rams from 1966 to 1970, and had recently been dismissed by the Washington Redskins, whom he had coached from 1971 to 1977.

His second stint as the Rams' head coach was an unfortunate experience for all concerned. Allen did not have full authority over personnel and thus worked with general manager Don Klosterman to oversee a talented roster that had made the team a perennial playoff challenger. Allen brought with him his scrupulous discipline and attention to detail, which extended to practice-field protocol and dining-hall decorum. Almost immediately, a group of Ram players chafed at the regulations, and some made their grievances public. A few, including standout linebacker Isiah Robertson, briefly left camp.

As newspaper reports were quoting players expressing confidence that differences would be resolved, the Rams played listlessly and lost the first two games of the exhibition schedule, 14–7 to the New England Patriots and 17–0 to the San Diego Chargers. Rosenbloom decided that for the season to be salvaged a change must be made, and the announcement of Allen's abrupt dismissal was made on August 13, 1978, just weeks before the season opener. Many of Allen's own players were surprised by the decision. Defensive coordinator Ray Malavasi, well-respected and liked by players (and the only holdover from Chuck Knox' staff), replaced Allen.

On Tuesday, July 25, 1978, the Rams announced plans to leave the Coliseum for Anaheim Stadium beginning with the 1980 season.

=== NFL draft ===
1978 Los Angeles Rams draft
Round	Pick	Player	Position	College	Notes
1	20	Elvis Peacock	Running back	Oklahoma	Played with Rams 1979–1980
2	46	Stan Johnson	Defensive tackle	Tennessee State	
2	53	Ron Smith	Wide receiver	San Diego State	
3	78	Frank Corral	Kicker	UCLA	
3	80	Leon White	Center	Colorado	Injured reserve
4	105	Mark Manges	Quarterback	Maryland	
7	189	Reggie Doss	Defensive end	Hampton	
9	246	Andre Anderson	Defensive end	New Mexico State	
10	273	Charles Peal	Tackle	Indiana	
11	303	Ron Hostetler	Linebacker	Penn State	
12	330	Gus Coppens	Tackle	UCLA	
Made roster * Made at least one Pro Bowl during career

=== Undrafted free agents ===
1978 undrafted free agents of note
Player	Position	College
Alan Caldwell	Safety	North Carolina
Milton Carter	Safety	Cal State Fullerton
Eddie Catoe	Defensive Tackle	USC
Preston Dennard	Wide receiver	New Mexico
Bob Pfister	Defensive Tackle	Arizona State
Dwayne O'Steen	Cornerback	San Jose State
Doug Smith	Center	Bowling Green

== Roster ==
1978 Los Angeles Rams roster
Quarterbacks (QB): 15 Vince Ferragamo; 11 Pat Haden; Running backs (RB): 32 Cullen Bryant; 22 John Cappelletti; 28 Anthony Davis; 43 Jim Jodat; 24 Jerry Latin; 39 Rod Phillips; Wide receivers (WR): 88 Preston Dennard; 81 Ron Jessie; 82 Willie Miller; 87 Dwight Scales; 84 Ron Smith; 80 Billy Waddy; Tight ends (TE): 83 Terry Nelson; 86 Charle Young	Offensive linemen (OL): 77 Doug France T; 60 Dennis Harrah G; 65 Tom Mack G; 54 Dan Ryczek C; 61 Rich Saul C; 78 Jackie Slater T; 56 Doug Smith G/C; 75 John Williams T; Defensive linemen (DL): 90 Larry Brooks DT; 71 Reggie Doss DE; 89 Fred Dryer DE; 79 Mike Fanning DT; 76 Cody Jones DT; 85 Jack Youngblood DE	Linebackers (LB): 59 Bob Brudzinski OLB; 55 Carl Ekern MLB; 50 Kevin McLain OLB; 64 Jack Reynolds MLB; 58 Isiah Robertson OLB; 53 Jim Youngblood OLB; Defensive backs (DB): 21 Nolan Cromwell FS; 42 Dave Elmendorf SS; 44 Larry Marshall CB; 49 Rod Perry CB; 48 Bill Simpson FS; 27 Pat Thomas CB; 20 Jackie Wallace SS; Special teams (ST): 3 Frank Corral K; 19 Glen Walker P	Reserve: 25 Eddie Brown S (IR); 73 Gus Coppens T (IR); 68 Ed Fulton G (IR); 30 Lawrence McCutcheon RB (IR); 94 Dave Morton LB (IR); 33 Dwayne O'Steen CB (IR); 34 Elvis Peacock RB (IR); 26 Wendell Tyler RB (IR); -- Leon White C (PUP); Rookies in italics

== Regular season ==
=== Schedule ===
Week	Date	Opponent	Result	Record	Venue	Attendance
1	September 3	at Philadelphia Eagles	**W** 16–14	1–0	Veterans Stadium	64,721
2	September 10	Atlanta Falcons	**W** 10–0	2–0	Los Angeles Memorial Coliseum	46,201
3	September 17	Dallas Cowboys	**W** 27–14	3–0	Los Angeles Memorial Coliseum	65,749
4	September 24	at Houston Oilers	**W** 10–6	4–0	Houston Astrodome	45,749
5	October 1	at New Orleans Saints	**W** 26–20	5–0	Louisiana Superdome	61,659
6	October 8	San Francisco 49ers	**W** 27–10	6–0	Los Angeles Memorial Coliseum	59,337
7	October 15	at Minnesota Vikings	**W** 34–17	7–0	Metropolitan Stadium	46,551
8	October 22	**New Orleans Saints**	**L** 3–10	7–1	Los Angeles Memorial Coliseum	47,574
9	October 30	at **Atlanta Falcons**	**L** 7–15	7–2	Atlanta–Fulton County Stadium	57,250
10	November 5	Tampa Bay Buccaneers	**W** 26–23	8–2	Los Angeles Memorial Coliseum	55,182
11	November 12	Pittsburgh Steelers	**W** 10–7	9–2	Los Angeles Memorial Coliseum	63,089
12	November 19	at **San Francisco 49ers**	**W** 31–28	10–2	Candlestick Park	45,022
13	November 26	at Cleveland Browns	**L** 19–30	10–3	Cleveland Municipal Stadium	55,158
14	December 3	at New York Giants	**W** 20–17	11–3	Giants Stadium	62,629
15	December 11	Cincinnati Bengals	**L** 19–20	11–4	Los Angeles Memorial Coliseum	47,471
16	December 17	Green Bay Packers	**W** 31–14	12–4	Los Angeles Memorial Coliseum	42,500
Note: Intra-division opponents are in **bold** text.

== Game summaries ==
=== Week 6 vs. San Francisco ===
- TV Network: CBS
- Announcers: Lindsey Nelson and Paul Hornung

In a penalty-filled game typical of those two teams, Pat Haden threw a pair of touchdown passes, one from 3 yards to John Cappelletti and the other from 11 yards to Wayne Miller helped the Rams stay unbeaten and spoiled the Los Angeles Memorial Coliseum return of former USC star O. J. Simpson, who rushed for 83 yards on 20 carries and caught four passes for 30 yards. Frank Corral booted two field goals from 47 and 38 yards while the 49ers' Ray Wersching kicked a 25-yard field goal. Steve Deberg hit only 7 of 26 passes for 83 yards and missed on a fourth-down pass from the Rams' two late in the game.

=== Standings ===
NFC West
	W	L	T	PCT	DIV	CONF	PF	PA	STK
Los Angeles Rams^{(1)}	12	4	0	.750	4–2	10–2	316	245	W1
Atlanta Falcons^{(4)}	9	7	0	.563	5–1	8–4	240	290	L1
New Orleans Saints	7	9	0	.438	3–3	6–6	281	298	W1
San Francisco 49ers	2	14	0	.125	0–6	1–11	219	350	L1

== Postseason ==
=== NFC Divisional Playoff ===
- Los Angeles Rams 34, Minnesota Vikings 10

	1	2	3	4	Total
Vikings	3	7	0	0	10
Rams	0	10	14	10	34

at Los Angeles Memorial Coliseum, Los Angeles

- TV: CBS
- Attendance: 69,631

After the game was tied 10–10 at halftime, the Rams dominated the second half by scoring 24 unanswered points to defeat Minnesota in the playoffs for the first time after four previous losses. After the Vikings opened up the scoring with a field goal, Los Angeles marched 59 yards to score on quarterback Pat Haden's 9-yard touchdown pass to wide receiver Willie Miller. Haden passed for 209 yards and threw a second touchdown pass in the third quarter, a 27-yard strike to wide receiver Ron Jessie. Kicker Frank Corral had two field goals in the game, and running back Cullen Bryant ran 27 times for 100 yards, including a 3-yard run in the third quarter to give the Rams the lead for good, while backup Jim Jodat added another touchdown for the game's final points. On defense, safety Bill Simpson intercepted two passes from Vikings quarterback Fran Tarkenton in what turned out to be the final game of Tarkenton's NFL career.

=== NFC Championship Game ===
- Dallas Cowboys 28, Los Angeles Rams 0

	1	2	3	4	Total
Cowboys	0	0	7	21	28
Rams	0	0	0	0	0

at Los Angeles Memorial Coliseum, Los Angeles

- TV announcers (CBS): Pat Summerall and Tom Brookshier
- Referee: Ben Dreith
- Attendance: 67,470

This game was a scoreless defensive struggle until the third quarter when Dallas safety Charlie Waters intercepted two Pat Haden passes intended for tight end Terry Nelson. Waters' first interception came in the middle of the third and led to a 5-yard touchdown run by running back Tony Dorsett. The Cowboys increased their lead to 14-0 as quarterback Roger Staubach threw a 4-yard touchdown pass to running back Scott Laidlaw. Then after the Rams were stopped on 4th and inches at the Dallas 21 yard line, Staubach then led a long scoring drive that ended with an 11-yard touchdown pass to tight end Billy Joe Dupree. Cowboys linebacker Thomas "Hollywood" Henderson, who had said in pre-game interviews that the Rams "didn't have enough class to go to the Super Bowl", backed up his words by capping the scoring with touchdown off a 68-yard interception return (the Cowboys' fifth of the game) of a Vince Ferragamo pass. Rams kicker Frank Corral missed two first half field goal attempts, the closest Los Angeles would get to scoring in the game, their fourth loss in the NFC Championship Game in five seasons.
