= Pat Haden =

American football player (born 1953)

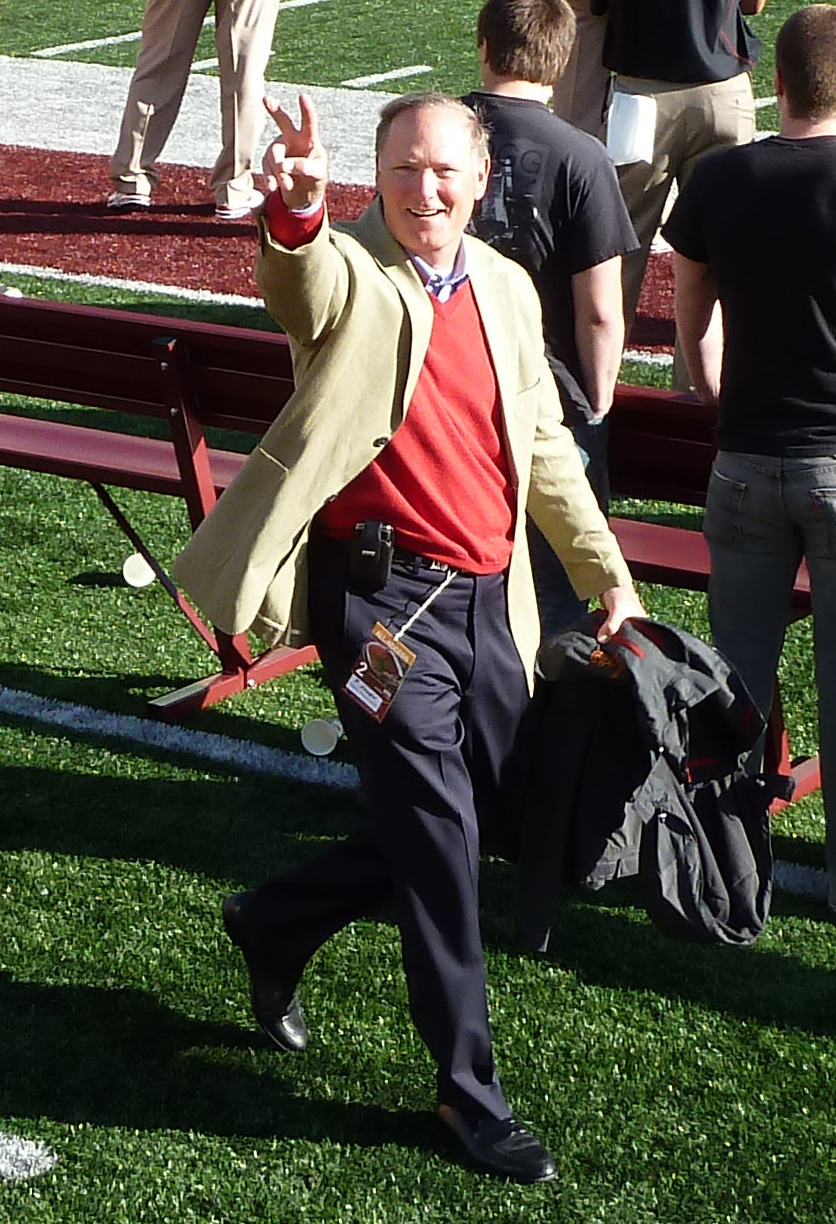
- Giving USC's "Fight On" sign in 2010

No. 11
- Position: Quarterback

Personal information
- Born: January 23, 1953 (age 73); Westbury, New York, U.S.
- Listed height: 5 ft 11 in (1.80 m)
- Listed weight: 182 lb (83 kg)

Career information
- High school: Bishop Amat Memorial (La Puente, California)
- College: USC
- NFL draft: 1975: 7th round, 176th overall pick

Career history

Playing
- Southern California Sun (1975); Los Angeles Rams (1976–1981)

Operations
- USC (2010–2016) Athletic director

Awards and highlights
- Pro Bowl (1977); 2× National champion (1972, 1974); Second-team All-Pac-8 (1974)

Career NFL statistics
- Passing attempts: 1,363
- Passing completions: 731
- Completion percentage: 53.6%
- TD–INT: 52–60
- Passing yards: 9,296
- Passer rating: 69.6
- Stats at Pro Football Reference

Patrick Capper Haden (born January 23, 1953) is an American former professional football player and college administrator. He was the athletic director at the University of Southern California (USC) in Los Angeles from August 2010 to June 2016. He played quarterback for the USC Trojans before playing professionally in the National Football League (NFL) for the Los Angeles Rams from 1976 through 1981. He also played in the World Football League (WFL) for the Southern California Sun in 1975.

Haden is a Rhodes Scholar, was a practicing attorney from 1982 to 1987, and was a partner at Riordan, Lewis & Haden, a private equity firm, from 1987 to 2010. He is also known for his work as a former sportscaster, beginning with CBS Sports in 1982, and ending his career in that field as a color commentator for NBC Sports' Notre Dame football coverage.

== Early life ==
Born in Westbury, New York, to working-class Irish American parents, Haden is the fourth of five children. He had a close relationship with his mother, Helen Haden, who told her children to "Live your life so that you have standing room only at your funeral."

As a boy, Haden had a boyhood paper route, then worked at a shoe store where he also pushed accessories in order to earn an extra commission. He had the same mentality in sports, where he used smarts and toughness he gained from keeping up with his older brothers to compensate for physical shortcomings. By high school, his parents had moved to Southern California.

Haden played high school football at Bishop Amat Memorial High School in La Puente, California, where he became starting quarterback. He became close friends with teammate J.K. McKay, son of then-USC football coach John McKay; the two were opposites: J.K. was quick-witted and easygoing, while Haden was more reserved. Haden and McKay shared the CIF Southern Section Player of the Year award in 1970. When Haden's parents had to move again, he stayed with the McKays for his senior year of high school. He was highly sought after and was recruited by many schools, including Notre Dame. Haden was inducted into the National High School Hall of Fame in 1995.

== College career ==
Prior to College Football Haden and McKay won the CIF championship game in overtime against Lakewood High School. The game was played at the LA Coliseum, where Haden would go on to lead the Trojans to many victories.

Haden and J.K. McKay joined the highly regarded USC Trojans under head coach John McKay; they joined a group of friends in living at an apartment building just off campus. At USC, he made it to three Rose Bowl appearances and won two national championships. In the final game of his college career, the 1975 Rose Bowl, he was named co-Most Valuable Player. Haden also was a recipient of the Today's Top V Award in 1975, which at the time honored five (now ten) senior student-athletes. He was put into the GTE Academic All-American Hall of Fame in 1988. He was inducted into the Rose Bowl Hall of Fame in 1995. An athletic and academic stand-out, he was awarded a Rhodes Scholarship.

In 1973, he threw for 1,832 yards with 13 touchdowns and 11 interceptions. In 1974, he threw for just 988 yards (in part due to 98 fewer pass attempts) but still threw 13 touchdowns and 11 interceptions.

== Professional career ==
Haden played one season in the World Football League, its last, for the Southern California Sun, which allowed him to attend school in England at Oxford University under his Rhodes Scholarship. His decision to go to the United Kingdom for schooling hurt his NFL possibilities, as did a lack of height (5 ft 10 in (1.78 m)) and arm strength, and he dropped to the seventh round of the 1975 NFL draft with the 176th overall pick.

Haden made the Los Angeles Rams' roster in 1976 as the third quarterback, behind James Harris and Ron Jaworski. When both Harris and Jaworski were injured, Haden was pressed into duty in the second game of the season. Haden responded by playing mostly mistake-free football, letting running backs Lawrence McCutcheon and John Cappelletti shoulder the offensive load and passing only occasionally. Harris returned to the lineup as starting quarterback and Haden went back to a backup role. In a Monday night game against the Cincinnati Bengals, Harris played poorly in a 20–12 loss, and Rams head coach Chuck Knox was ordered by team owner Carroll Rosenbloom to bench Harris in favor of Haden. This is documented in Knox's autobiography Hard Knox: The Life of an NFL Coach and William Rhoden's Third and a Mile: The Trials and Triumph of the Black Quarterback. At the time of the quarterback change, Harris was the top-rated passer of the National Football Conference. The NFL records show that Harris finished as the NFC's top-rated passer of 1976. Despite the change, the Rams went on to win the NFC Western Division title and a 14–12 upset of the defending NFC champion Dallas Cowboys in the opening round of the NFC playoffs, but the Rams fell to the Minnesota Vikings in the NFC championship game.

The Rams revamped their quarterback position for the 1977 season. Harris and Jaworski were traded, and the Rams acquired veteran QB Joe Namath from the New York Jets. Namath started the first four games, but it was evident his knees couldn't take it anymore, so the Rams went back to Haden. The Rams took eight victories in the last 10 games, won the NFC West and made the playoffs again. Their first-round opponent was the Vikings at home in the rain, but the Rams lost 14–7 in the Mud Bowl. Haden's small hands impaired his ability to grip the wet muddy ball as the heavy rain turned the turf at the Los Angeles Memorial Coliseum into a quagmire. Haden completed 14 of 32 passes for 130 yards and one touchdown with three interceptions, while Vikings backup QB Bob Lee (playing in place of injured starter Fran Tarkenton) was only able to complete five of 10 passes for 57 yards and no touchdowns or interceptions. Despite the loss, Haden completed 122 of 216 passes for 1,551 yards with 11 touchdown passes and six interceptions during the regular season and was named to his first and only Pro Bowl.

Haden was rewarded with the starting position from day one in 1978. The Rams started fast, winning their first eight games, but tailed off to 12–4, and won their third straight NFC West Division title. Haden threw a pair of touchdown passes and led the Rams to a 34–10 victory against the Vikings in the first round of the playoffs. The defending champion Dallas Cowboys walloped the Rams 28–0 in the 1978 NFC Championship Game on their way to Super Bowl XIII. Haden was voted the Washington D.C. Touchdown Club NFC Player of the Year of the 1978 season.

Haden began the 1979 season as the starter, but a broken finger midway through the season sidelined him in favor of Vince Ferragamo, who led the Rams to Super Bowl XIV.

Because of Rams' coach Ray Malavasi's policy of giving an injured starter his job back, Haden began the 1980 season as the starter with Ferragamo as the backup. Haden was injured in the Rams season opener against the Detroit Lions. Ferragamo took over as the starter and didn't relinquish the job (despite Haden returning mid-season), passing for a then Rams-record 30 touchdown passes.

Ferragamo, however, bolted the Rams for the Canadian Football League. Haden went into the 1981 season as starter, but was injured midway through the season. After the season, while recovering from knee surgery and contemplating retirement, he got a call from CBS about a broadcast job and decided to take it.

== Broadcasting career ==
After spending a few years at CBS, Haden was hired as the color commentator for NBC Sports' coverage of Notre Dame college football, and held similar duties for their Arena Football coverage from 2003 through 2006 and Fox Sports' Bowl Championship Series coverage in 2008. His position as the Notre Dame color commentator is ironic in that he, as USC's quarterback in 1974, helped orchestrate one of Notre Dame's greatest losses (and, conversely, one of USC's greatest wins, known as "The Comeback"). The Trojans won 55–24 despite trailing 24–0 at one point and 24–6 at halftime. Haden admitted later that his decision to go to USC went against the wishes of his mother.

Haden also was a color man for CBS Sports' college football coverage (being one of a three-man booth with former Notre Dame coach Ara Parseghian and play-by-play man Brent Musburger, and later working with Jim Nantz [as a color analyst on games, and a co-host in the studio with Nantz before that in 1985]), and provided color commentary for TNT's Sunday night football coverage and Westwood One's radiocasts, primarily working the Sunday night schedule which immediately followed his TV commitments (at the time, TNT and ESPN split the Sunday night games between them, with TNT broadcasting the first half of the season and ESPN the second half).

Haden also called some NFL on CBS games in 1988 and 1989 during the busier weeks of the 1988–1989 NFL season, when the network's seven announcing teams weren't enough to cover the network games.

Haden also hosted a pilot for a revival of The Krypton Factor. The series was picked up for weekend syndication in the fall of 1990, but the hosting job went to former Eight is Enough and Charles in Charge star, Willie Aames.

== Private equity career ==
In 1987, he joined Riordan, Lewis & Haden, a private equity firm based in Los Angeles that focuses on making investments in growing, profitable businesses with $20 – 200 million in revenue. He has served as a director of a number of RLH portfolio companies including TetraTech, Systems Management Specialists, Data Processing Resources Corporation (formerly NASDAQ: DPRC), The Apothecary Shops, and Adohr Farms. Haden remained a partner at RLH until assuming the position of athletic director for the University of Southern California.

== Athletic director ==
Haden replaced Mike Garrett as the USC Trojans athletic director on August 3, 2010. On September 8, 2014, he and USC football coach Steve Sarkisian were reprimanded by Pac-12 Conference commissioner Larry Scott for attempting "to influence the officiating, and ultimately the outcome of a contest" during the September 6 game with Stanford. Haden was fined $25,000. On October 11, 2015, Haden placed Sarkisian on leave after a series of incidents culminating in the coach missing a practice during the season. The next day, Haden announced that Sarkisian had been fired.

On February 5, 2016, Haden announced that he would be stepping down as USC's athletic director effective June 30.

== College Football Playoff Selection Committee ==
Haden was one of 13 members of the inaugural College Football Playoff selection committee. In September 2014 Haden received criticism and calls to resign from the selection committee by charging onto the field in order to argue with officials regarding a series of penalties during the third quarter of USC's 13–10 victory against Stanford.

== Education ==
Haden received a B.A., magna cum laude, Phi Beta Kappa from the University of Southern California, a J.D. from Loyola Law School and a B.A. in economics from the University of Oxford as a Rhodes Scholar.

== Community activities ==
Haden has served on numerous nonprofit boards. He sits on the boards of the Rose Hills Foundation and the Fletcher Jones Foundation, and has also served on the boards of non-profit organizations including the University of Southern California, the Good Samaritan Hospital, Boys Town of Southern California, the Multiple Sclerosis Society of Los Angeles, and the Crippled Children's Society of Los Angeles. He is former chair of the March of Dimes Reading Olympics in Los Angeles and the Boys Life National Illiteracy Campaign.

Haden is a board member for the Lott IMPACT Trophy, which is named after Ronnie Lott and is awarded annually to college football's Defensive IMPACT Player of the Year.

Haden was awarded the Ambassador Award of Excellence by the LA Sports & Entertainment Commission in 2003 for his community involvement.

== NFL career statistics ==
Legend
**Bold**	Career high

=== Regular season ===
Year	Team	Games			Passing									Rushing					Sacks	
Year	Team	GP	GS	Record	Cmp	Att	Pct	Yds	Y/A	Lng	TD	Int	Rtg	Att	Yds	Avg	Lng	TD	Sck	Yds
1976	RAM	10	7	5-1-1	60	105	**57.1**	896	**8.5**	65	8	4	**94.8**	25	84	3.4	16	**4**	13	86
1977	RAM	12	10	8-2	122	216	56.5	1,551	7.2	58	11	6	84.5	29	106	3.7	23	2	17	151
1978	RAM	**16**	**16**	**12-4**	**229**	**444**	51.6	**2,995**	6.7	**68**	**13**	**19**	65.1	**33**	**206**	**6.2**	**24**	0	**32**	216
1979	RAM	10	10	5-5	163	290	56.2	1,854	6.4	50	11	14	68.1	16	97	6.1	17	0	21	178
1980	RAM	4	1	0-1	19	41	46.3	185	4.5	24	0	4	19.9	3	12	4.0	6	0	4	30
1981	RAM	13	11	5-6	138	267	51.7	1,815	6.8	67	9	13	64.4	18	104	5.8	16	0	28	**227**
Career		65	55	35-19-1	731	1,363	53.6	9,296	6.8	68	52	60	69.6	124	609	4.9	24	6	115	888

=== Playoffs ===
Year	Team	Games			Passing									Rushing					Sacks	
Year	Team	GP	GS	Record	Cmp	Att	Pct	Yds	Y/A	Lng	TD	Int	Rtg	Att	Yds	Avg	Lng	TD	Sck	Yds
1976	RAM	**2**	**2**	**1-1**	19	43	44.2	**313**	**7.3**	**42**	1	**5**	37.4	**11**	19	1.7	6	**1**	**6**	**63**
1977	RAM	1	1	0-1	14	32	43.8	130	4.1	24	1	3	26.8	3	27	**9.0**	13	0	1	12
1978	RAM	**2**	**2**	**1-1**	**22**	**48**	**45.8**	285	5.9	29	**2**	4	**44.2**	4	**35**	8.8	**18**	0	2	1
Career		5	5	2-3	55	123	44.7	728	5.9	42	4	12	35.3	18	81	4.5	18	1	9	76
