= Haskel Stanback =

American football player (born 1952)

No. 24
- Position: Running back

Personal information
- Born: March 19, 1952 (age 74); Kannapolis, North Carolina, U.S.
- Listed height: 6 ft 0 in (1.83 m)
- Listed weight: 210 lb (95 kg)

Career information
- High school: A.L. Brown (Kannapolis, North Carolina)
- College: Tennessee
- NFL draft: 1974: 5th round, 110th overall pick

Career history
- Cincinnati Bengals (1974)*; Atlanta Falcons (1974–1979)
- * Offseason or practice squad member only

Awards and highlights
- 2× Second-team All-SEC (1972, 1973)

Career NFL statistics
- Rushing attempts: 728
- Rushing yards: 2,662
- Rushing TDs: 25
- Stats at Pro Football Reference

Haskel LaVon Stanback (born March 19, 1952) is an American former professional football player who played running back for seven seasons for the Atlanta Falcons. He was selected 110th overall by the Cincinnati Bengals in the fifth round of the 1974 NFL draft after attending the University of Tennessee. In Week 14 of the 1977 season, he had 22 carries for 129 yards and two touchdowns in a 35–7 win over the New Orleans Saints. In his NFL career, he rushed for 2,662 yards and 25 touchdowns from 1974 to 1979. He was enshrined into the Tennessee Sports Hall of Fame.

== NFL career statistics ==
Legend
**Bold**	Career high

=== Regular season ===
Year	Team	Games		Rushing					Receiving				
Year	Team	GP	GS	Att	Yds	Avg	Lng	TD	Rec	Yds	Avg	Lng	TD
1974	ATL	13	3	57	235	4.1	23	1	8	39	4.9	18	0
1975	ATL	14	10	105	440	4.2	26	5	14	115	8.2	14	0
1976	ATL	14	7	95	324	3.4	30	3	21	174	8.3	28	**1**
1977	ATL	14	14	**247**	**873**	3.5	35	**6**	**30**	**261**	8.7	**36**	0
1978	ATL	**15**	**15**	188	588	3.1	26	5	12	108	**9.0**	20	0
1979	ATL	13	3	36	202	**5.6**	**55**	5	13	89	6.8	22	0
		83	52	728	2,662	3.7	55	25	98	786	8.0	36	1

=== Playoffs ===
Year	Team	Games		Rushing					Receiving				
Year	Team	GP	GS	Att	Yds	Avg	Lng	TD	Rec	Yds	Avg	Lng	TD
1978	ATL	**2**	**2**	**25**	**120**	**4.8**	**14**	0	**2**	**7**	**3.5**	**7**	0
		2	2	25	120	4.8	14	0	2	7	3.5	7	0
