= Homer Butler =

American football player (born 1957)

No. 33
- Position: Safety

Personal information
- Born: January 26, 1957 (age 69); Washington, D.C., U.S.
- Listed height: 6 ft 2 in (1.88 m)
- Listed weight: 190 lb (86 kg)

Career information
- High school: Los Angeles
- College: UCLA
- NFL draft: 1978: 8th round, 222nd overall pick

Career history
- Dallas Cowboys (1978)*; Saskatchewan Roughriders (1978–1979)
- * Offseason or practice squad member only

Career CFL statistics
- Games played: 8

Homer Bowen Butler III (born January 26, 1957) is an American former professional football player who was a safety in the Canadian Football League (CFL) for the Saskatchewan Roughriders. He played college football for the UCLA Bruins.

== Early life ==
Butler attended Los Angeles High School, where he practiced football and track. He was a starter at wide receiver and was named All-city as a senior.

He enrolled at Los Angeles City College. As a freshman, he averaged 18 yards on 31 receptions. As a sophomore, he averaged almost 20 yards on 40 receptions. He had four touchdowns against San Bernardino Valley College, breaking Kermit Alexander's school record. He scored 13 touchdowns in two seasons and was a two-time All-conference selection. He also was an All-conference shortstop in baseball.

He transferred to the University of California, Los Angeles, for his junior season. As a starting wide receiver with the Bruins, he was second on the team with 11 receptions for 166 yards (15.1-yard avg.) and two touchdowns. As a senior, he led the team with 25 receptions for 584 yards (23.4-yard avg.) and four touchdowns.

== Professional career ==
Butler was selected by the Dallas Cowboys in the eighth round (222nd overall) of the 1978 NFL draft, to convert him into a defensive back. He was waived on August 13.

In August 1978, he was signed as a free agent by the Saskatchewan Roughriders of the Canadian Football League. He played safety and was a kickoff returner.
