= Bubba Bean =

American football player (born 1954)

No. 44
- Position: Running back

Personal information
- Born: January 26, 1954 (age 72); Kirbyville, Texas, U.S.
- Listed height: 5 ft 11 in (1.80 m)
- Listed weight: 195 lb (88 kg)

Career information
- High school: Kirbyville (TX)
- College: Texas A&M
- NFL draft: 1976: 1st round, 9th overall pick

Career history
- Atlanta Falcons (1976–1979)

Awards and highlights
- 2× First-team All-SWC (1974, 1975)

Career NFL statistics
- Rushing attempts: 405
- Rushing yards: 1,528
- Rushing TDs: 6
- Stats at Pro Football Reference

Earnest Ray "Bubba" Bean is an American former professional football player who was a running back with the Atlanta Falcons of the National Football League (NFL). He was selected ninth overall in the first round of the 1976 NFL draft. Bubba played three seasons for the Falcons between 1976 and 1979.

== College ==
Bean played running back in college for Texas A&M University. He was a four-year starter there. In his senior year, Bean was featured on the cover of Sports Illustrated; in his final two years as an Aggie, Bean ran for over 900 yards each season (938 in 1974, 944 in 1975). He led the Southwest Conference in rushing average in his sophomore year of 1973 with a 6.3 average.

In his career, Bean rushed for 2,846 yards at Texas A&M, a record that was later surpassed. All 19 of Bean's touchdowns came on the ground, and he ranks fifth in SWC history with a career rushing average of 5.9 yards per attempt. Across his four years playing for Emory Bellard's Aggies, Texas A&M went from 3-8 his freshman year to a 10–2 record his senior year. A&M was ranked in the final AP Top 20 Poll in both 1974 and 1975. The 1974 season marked the first time the Aggies finished the season in the final Top 20 poll since the famed 1957 A&M squad led by Bear Bryant and Heisman Trophy winner John David Crow. The 1975 team played in the school's first bowl game since 1967.

== NFL ==
Bean was drafted ninth overall in the first round of the 1976 NFL Draft by the Atlanta Falcons.

In the 1976 season, the rookie rushed for 428 yards on 128 rushes for an average of 3.5 yards per carry.

Despite being sidelined for the entire 1977 season with a torn anterior cruciate ligament, he came back in 1978 to enjoy his best season as a professional. Bean ran for 707 yards on 193 attempts and catching 31 passes for another 209 yards.

In 1979, rookie William Andrews arrived and beat out Bean for the starting position. Andrews rushed for over 1,000 yards that year and was selected to the Pro Bowl each of the following four years. It would prove to be Bean's final NFL season.

In his career, Bean's yards per carry increased each year, finishing with 4.5 in his last year on 88 attempts. As a professional, he finished with 1,528 rushing yards and six rushing touchdowns; and recorded 59 receptions for 494 yards and two touchdowns. Bean was also 1-for-2 in his career passing with one touchdown and one interception.

== After Football ==
In 1982, Bean joined the Texas A&M career planning and placement office. 12 years later, he formed Bean Construction, which he operated for a number of years in College Station, Texas.

Bean was inducted in the Texas High School Football Hall of Fame in May 2009.

== NFL career statistics ==
Legend
**Bold**	Career high

=== Regular season ===
Year	Team	Games		Rushing					Receiving				
Year	Team	GP	GS	Att	Yds	Avg	Lng	TD	Rec	Yds	Avg	Lng	TD
1976	ATL	14	8	124	428	3.5	30	2	16	148	9.3	**50**	**1**
1978	ATL	**15**	**15**	**193**	**707**	3.7	25	**3**	**31**	**209**	6.7	38	**1**
1979	ATL	11	11	88	393	**4.5**	**60**	1	12	137	**11.4**	49	0
		40	34	405	1,528	3.8	60	6	59	494	8.4	50	2

=== Playoffs ===
Year	Team	Games		Rushing					Receiving				
Year	Team	GP	GS	Att	Yds	Avg	Lng	TD	Rec	Yds	Avg	Lng	TD
1978	ATL	**2**	**2**	**26**	**86**	**3.3**	**14**	**1**	**4**	**44**	**11.0**	**19**	0
		2	2	26	86	3.3	14	1	4	44	11.0	19	0
