= Rod Perry (American football) =

American football player and coach (born 1953)

Oregon State Beavers
- Title: Cornerback; Defensive backs coach

Personal information
- Born: September 11, 1953 (age 73); Fresno, California, U.S.
- Listed height: 5 ft 9 in (1.75 m)
- Listed weight: 178 lb (81 kg)

Career information
- High school: Hoover (CA)
- College: Colorado
- NFL draft: 1975: 4th round, 98th overall pick

Career history

Playing
- Los Angeles Rams (1975–1982); Cleveland Browns (1983–1984)

Coaching
- Seattle Seahawks (1989–1991) Defensive backs coach; Los Angeles Rams (1992–1994) Defensive backs coach; Houston Oilers (1995–1996) Defensive backs coach; San Diego Chargers (1997–2001) Defensive backs coach; Carolina Panthers (2002–2006) Secondary coach; Indianapolis Colts (2007–2012) Special assistant to the defense; Oregon State Beavers (2012–present) Defensive backs coach

Awards and highlights
- 2× Pro Bowl (1978, 1980)

Career NFL statistics
- Sacks: 1.0
- Fumble recoveries: 6
- Interceptions: 30
- Defensive touchdowns: 4
- Stats at Pro Football Reference

Rodney Cornell Perry (born September 11, 1953) is an American football coach and former professional player who is the defensive backs coach for the Oregon State Beavers. He played as a cornerback in the National Football League (NFL), primarily with the Los Angeles Rams. Perry was a two-time Pro Bowl selection.
