= Dennis Pearson =

American football player (born 1955)

No. 81
- Position: Wide receiver

Personal information
- Born: February 9, 1955 (age 71); Gordo, Alabama, U.S.
- Listed height: 5 ft 11 in (1.80 m)
- Listed weight: 177 lb (80 kg)

Career information
- High school: Monterey (Monterey, California)
- College: Washington State; San Diego State
- NFL draft: 1978: 5th round, 125th overall pick

Career history
- Atlanta Falcons (1978–1979)

Career NFL statistics
- Receptions: 12
- Receiving yards: 190
- Total touchdowns: 1
- Stats at Pro Football Reference

Dennis Mack Pearson (born February 9, 1955) is an American former professional football player who was a wide receiver for the Atlanta Falcons of the National Football League (NFL) from 1978 to 1979. He played college football for the Washington State Cougars and San Diego State Aztecs.
