= Tom Moriarty =

American football player (born 1953)

No. 45
- Position: Safety

Personal information
- Born: April 7, 1953 (age 73); Lima, Ohio, U.S.
- Listed height: 6 ft 0 in (1.83 m)
- Listed weight: 185 lb (84 kg)

Career information
- High school: Benedictine (Cleveland, Ohio)
- College: Bowling Green
- NFL draft: 1976: undrafted

Career history
- Dallas Cowboys (1976)*; Atlanta Falcons (1977–1979); Pittsburgh Steelers (1980); Atlanta Falcons (1981)
- * Offseason or practice squad member only
- Stats at Pro Football Reference

Tom Moriarty (born April 7, 1953) is an American former professional football player who was a defensive back in the National Football League (NFL). He played college football for the Bowling Green Falcons. Moriarty played in the NFL for the Atlanta Falcons from 1977 to 1979 and again in 1981 as well as playing one season with the Pittsburgh Steelers in 1980. He also played for the Michigan Panthers of the United States Football League (USFL).
