= Tim Mazzetti =

American football player (born 1956)

No. 4
- Position: Placekicker

Personal information
- Born: February 1, 1956 (age 70); Old Greenwich, Connecticut, U.S.
- Listed height: 6 ft 1 in (1.85 m)
- Listed weight: 175 lb (79 kg)

Career information
- High school: Graded School (Brazil)
- College: Pennsylvania
- NFL draft: 1977: undrafted

Career history
- Atlanta Falcons (1978–1980); Boston/New Orleans/Portland Breakers (1983-1985)

Career NFL statistics
- Field goals: 45
- Field goal attempts: 68
- Field goal %: 66.2
- Longest field goal: 50
- Stats at Pro Football Reference

Timothy Alan Mazzetti (born February 1, 1956) is a former National Football League (NFL) placekicker from 1978 to 1980 for the Atlanta Falcons. He later played with the Boston/New Orleans/Portland Breakers of the United States Football League (USFL).

== Early life ==
Tim Mazzetti was at first glance an unlikely candidate to be a professional football player. His upbringing was a learned one in São Paulo, Brazil. Mazzetti moved to São Paulo when he was 2 years old and lived there until he was 17 before leaving for the University of Pennsylvania, when he was accepted to the prestigious Wharton School of Business in Philadelphia. While in Brazil, Mazzetti played soccer. During the summer before his sophomore year at Penn, a fellow ATO fraternity brother, Jim Roussos, introduced him to the football team. Mazzetti ended up sharing the kicking duties his sophomore year and then taking on the duties for the Penn Quakers full-time in his junior year. During his junior and senior years, Mazzetti set several school records, including for longest FG (54 yards, twice), as well as kicking several game-winning FGs. Mazzetti also was an All-Ivy League player for Penn's soccer team, but decided to leave the team in his senior year to concentrate full-time on kicking footballs.

== Professional career ==
As a result of his achievements on the gridiron at Penn, Mazzetti received an invitation to try out for the New England Patriots in training camp in the summer of 1977 after his senior year, but after failing the physical as a result of a hernia, he lost the opportunity to play during the 1977 NFL season.

After the successful hernia operation in November 1977, Mazzetti got back in shape by returning to São Paulo, Brazil and working out with a semi-professional soccer team in the winter of 1977–78 and returned to Philadelphia in time to attend the open tryouts for the Philadelphia Eagles and the New York Jets. He was invited to go to training camps for both teams, and decided on the Eagles. Mazzetti made it through the entire training camp that summer of 1978, but was released in the last cut when head coach Dick Vermeil decided to go with his veteran, Nick Mike-Mayer. Mazzetti then was invited to single-day tryouts once the 1978 season began for the Dallas Cowboys but lost out to Rafael Septién and the New Orleans Saints. Still unsigned, Mazzetti settled for a $50 a night job as a bartender at Smokey Joe's near the University of Pennsylvania campus. Six games into the season, Mazzetti signed with the Atlanta Falcons. Mazzetti had a cinderella season that first year with Atlanta, making 13 of 16 FGs, including a team record 11 in a row, as well as kicking 4 game-winning FGs. In a memorable Monday-night game against the division leading Los Angeles Rams on October 30, 1978, Tim Mazzetti went 5-for-5 and the Falcons won 15–7. During the game, Howard Cosell exclaimed, "This Philadelphia bartender won't need to mix scotch-and-waters any longer." As a result of Mazzetti's heroics, the Falcons made it into the playoffs for the first time ever in the franchise's history as a wild-card, and in their first-ever post-season game against the Philadelphia Eagles, Mazzetti's former employer, he provided the point differential in a 14–13 game. Mazzetti remained with the Falcons through the 1980 season, but was cut by the team near the end of its 1981 training camp.

When Mazzetti decided not to play for the Cleveland Browns after they picked him up off the waiver wire in 1981, he joined the ABC television affiliate WSB-TV in Atlanta as the sports reporter through 1982, when he decided to come out of "retirement" and signed on as a free agent with the Boston Breakers in 1983. Mazzetti played all three seasons with the Breakers, where he was selected to the All-USFL team his first year and also became the subject of a pro football trivia question in the process – the first player to score a point in the USFL, on a 30-yard field goal in the Breakers inaugural game against the Tampa Bay Bandits. Mazzetti moved along with the Breakers to New Orleans, then to Portland, wrapping up his football days there in 1985.

== Personal life ==
Learning the business during off-seasons beginning in 1984, Mazzetti's interests eventually evolved into commercial real estate finance, joining Midland Loan Services in Kansas City, Missouri, in 1994 and eventually becoming its executive vice president. There Mazzetti was instrumental in growing Midland into a major player in the industry. Then in September, 2006 Mazzetti joined Cohen Financial as a partner and Executive Vice President. Cohen Financial is a leading capital services provider to the commercial real estate finance industry based in Chicago.
