= Tom Pridemore =

American football player and politician (born 1956)

Profile
- Position: Safety

Personal information
- Born: April 29, 1956 (age 70); Ansted, West Virginia, U.S.

Career information
- College: West Virginia
- NFL draft: 1978: 236th overall pick / 9th round

Career history
- 1978–1985: Atlanta Falcons

Awards and highlights
- West Virginia University Hall of Fame
- Stats at Pro Football Reference

Other information

Member of the West Virginia House of Delegates from the Fayette County district
- In office 1981–1983

Personal details
- Party: Democratic

Larry Thomas Pridemore Jr. (born April 29, 1956) is a former safety from West Virginia who played eight seasons in the National Football League (NFL) for the Atlanta Falcons and served as a delegate in the West Virginia House of Delegates from 1981–1983.

== High school ==
Pridemore played for the Ansted High School Highlanders and was a member of the record setting team that won 36 straight games on their way to winning back-to-back state championships (1971 and 1972).

== College ==
Pridemore, who was inducted into the West Virginia University Hall of Fame in 2001, holds school records that include: most career interception return yards (398 - 26.5 yards per return), most single game interception return yards, and most career interceptions (15). He also holds a WVU school record which doubles as an NCAA record as the Longest interception returned for a touchdown (102 yards vs Penn State). As a sophomore, Pridemore led the Mountaineers to a 1975 Peach Bowl victory against the NC State Wolfpack.

== NFL ==
After being drafted by the Atlanta Falcons in the ninth round of the 1978 NFL draft, Pridemore saw his first start in the third game of his rookie year and never looked back. Pridemore was Atlanta's starting free safety for the next eight years, and earned the reputation as one of the meanest, hardest-hitting safeties in the game. With 21 career interceptions (returned for 368 total yards), Pridemore ranks sixth on Atlanta's all-time pick list behind Deion Sanders. He ranks fourth on the all-time list for most interceptions in a season at 7, and holds the Falcon's club record for most interception return yards in a single season (271). In 1981 Pridemore picked off a Joe Montana pass from a yard deep in Atlanta's own end-zone and returned it 101 yards for a touchdown, which is a team record. This duplication of Pridemore's previous college and NCAA record will probably also stand for quite some time, if not forever in Atlanta. While playing for the Falcons, Pridemore served one term in the West Virginia House of Delegates, between 1981 and 1983 as a Democrat. He is the only NFL player to hold this legislative office while playing professional football.

== Life after football ==
After his tenure with the Falcons, Pridemore settled in Atlanta with his wife Leigh and four children, and went on to found Pride Utility Construction Company with long-time friend and teammate Scott Case. Pridemore is a prominent businessman in the greater Atlanta area, and has personal ventures in residential real-estate and timber properties.

Pridemore had two sons who played football at the collegiate level. Matt, the eldest, enrolled at Duke University as a wide receiver in 2007, and TJ, who played fullback for the University of Florida, enrolled in 2008.
