= Willie Miller (American football) =

American football player (born 1947)

No. 80, 82
- Position: Wide receiver

Personal information
- Born: April 26, 1947 (age 79); Birmingham, Alabama, U.S.
- Listed height: 5 ft 9 in (1.75 m)
- Listed weight: 172 lb (78 kg)

Career information
- College: Colorado State
- NFL draft: 1975: 12th round, 302nd overall pick

Career history
- Cleveland Browns (1975–1976); Los Angeles Rams (1978–1982)

Career NFL statistics
- Receptions: 112
- Receiving yards: 1,786
- Receiving touchdowns: 15
- Stats at Pro Football Reference

Willie T. Miller (born April 26, 1947) is an American former professional football player who was a wide receiver for seven seasons in the National Football League (NFL) with the Cleveland Browns and the Los Angeles Rams. He played college football for the Colorado State Rams.

== Military service ==
After graduating from Hooper City High School in Birmingham, Alabama, Miller enlisted in the U.S. Army and trained with the Special Forces. In the Vietnam War, Miller earned the rank of staff sergeant. He was awarded a Silver Star for retrieving his wounded platoon sergeant under heavy enemy fire. He was awarded a Soldier's Medal for repeatedly trying to save another soldier who fell into a stream in a flash flood. He was wounded by a bullet in his thigh and received a Purple Heart.

== College career ==
While stationed in El Paso, Texas, Miller met with the football coaches at Colorado State University at a game against the UTEP Miners, and they offered him a scholarship. Miller was discharged from the army after five and a half years of service and enrolled at Colorado State in the fall of 1971. During his three years on the varsity squad, Miller broke every Colorado State receiving record, and in 1974 the Colorado Sports Hall of Fame named him Athlete of the Year.

== Professional career ==
Miller was selected by the Houston Oilers in the 12th round of the 1975 NFL Draft. He never started for the Browns and missed the entire 1977 season with a dislocated elbow. He was cut by the Browns and signed with the Los Angeles Rams, earning a spot in the starting lineup in 1978 and leading the team with 50 receptions for 760 yards and four touchdowns. He was on the roster for the 1979 Rams team that went to the Super Bowl, although he did not play due to injury. He retired from in 1983 after three more seasons with the Rams.

== Coaching career ==
Miller took a high school football coaching job at Hayes High School in Birmingham in 1984. He was the head football coach at Birmingham's G.W. Carver in 2002 and 2003. Miller was the head coach at E.B. Erwin High School from 2005 until he retired in 2013.
