= Cullen Bryant =

American football player (1951–2009)

No. 32
- Position: Running back

Personal information
- Born: May 20, 1951; Fort Sill, Oklahoma, U.S.
- Died: October 13, 2009 (aged 58); Colorado Springs, Colorado, U.S.
- Listed height: 6 ft 1 in (1.85 m)
- Listed weight: 234 lb (106 kg)

Career information
- High school: Mitchell (CO)
- College: Colorado
- NFL draft: 1973: 2nd round, 31st overall pick

Career history
- Los Angeles Rams (1973–1982); Seattle Seahawks (1983–1984); Los Angeles Rams (1987)

Awards and highlights
- Consensus All-American (1972); First-team All-Big Eight (1972)

Career NFL statistics
- Rushing attempts: 849
- Rushing yards: 3,264
- Rushing touchdowns: 20
- Stats at Pro Football Reference

William Cullen Bryant (May 20, 1951 – October 13, 2009) was an American professional football player who was a running back and return specialist for 13 seasons in the National Football League (NFL) for the Los Angeles Rams and Seattle Seahawks. He played college football for the Colorado Buffaloes.

== Early life ==
Bryant was born in Fort Sill, Oklahoma. His father, who was a fan of poetry, named him after the poet William Cullen Bryant. He graduated as part of the first class to spend all three years at William (Billy) Mitchell High School in Colorado Springs, Colorado, in 1969.

A three-year letterman (1970–1972) who played for Eddie Crowder at the University of Colorado, Bryant, who wore uniform number 16, starred at defensive back. During his junior and senior years, the Buffaloes were nationally ranked in the Associated Press (AP) Poll, finishing 3rd and 16th in 1971 and 1972 respectively. He played in the Senior Bowl and College All-Star Game in 1973.

== Professional career ==
He was selected by the Rams in the second round (31st overall) of the 1973 NFL draft. He was the primary return specialist in his first four years with the team, working exclusively on kickoffs as a rookie. He scored his first NFL touchdown on September 30, 1973, when he returned a first-quarter kickoff 93 yards in a 40–20 victory over the 49ers in San Francisco.

Bryant's one-yard touchdown run in the first quarter gave the Rams an early 7–3 lead in its 31–19 loss to the Pittsburgh Steelers in Super Bowl XIV. He ended the game with 6 carries for 30 yards.

== Rozelle Rule challenge ==
At the behest of Rams owner Carroll Rosenbloom, Bryant went to court in 1975 to challenge his transfer to the Detroit Lions under the Pete Rozelle Rule. This came after Rozelle ordered Bryant off the Rams and sent to Detroit as compensation for the Rams signing free agent wide receiver Ron Jessie. After the judge appeared sympathetic to Bryant's case, the NFL backed off and the Rozelle Rule was subsequently modified.

== Later life ==
He served as running backs coach under Chuck Stobart at the University of Memphis from 1990 through 1993. Bryant died of natural causes on October 13, 2009, at his home in Colorado Springs.
