= List of San Francisco 49ers head coaches =

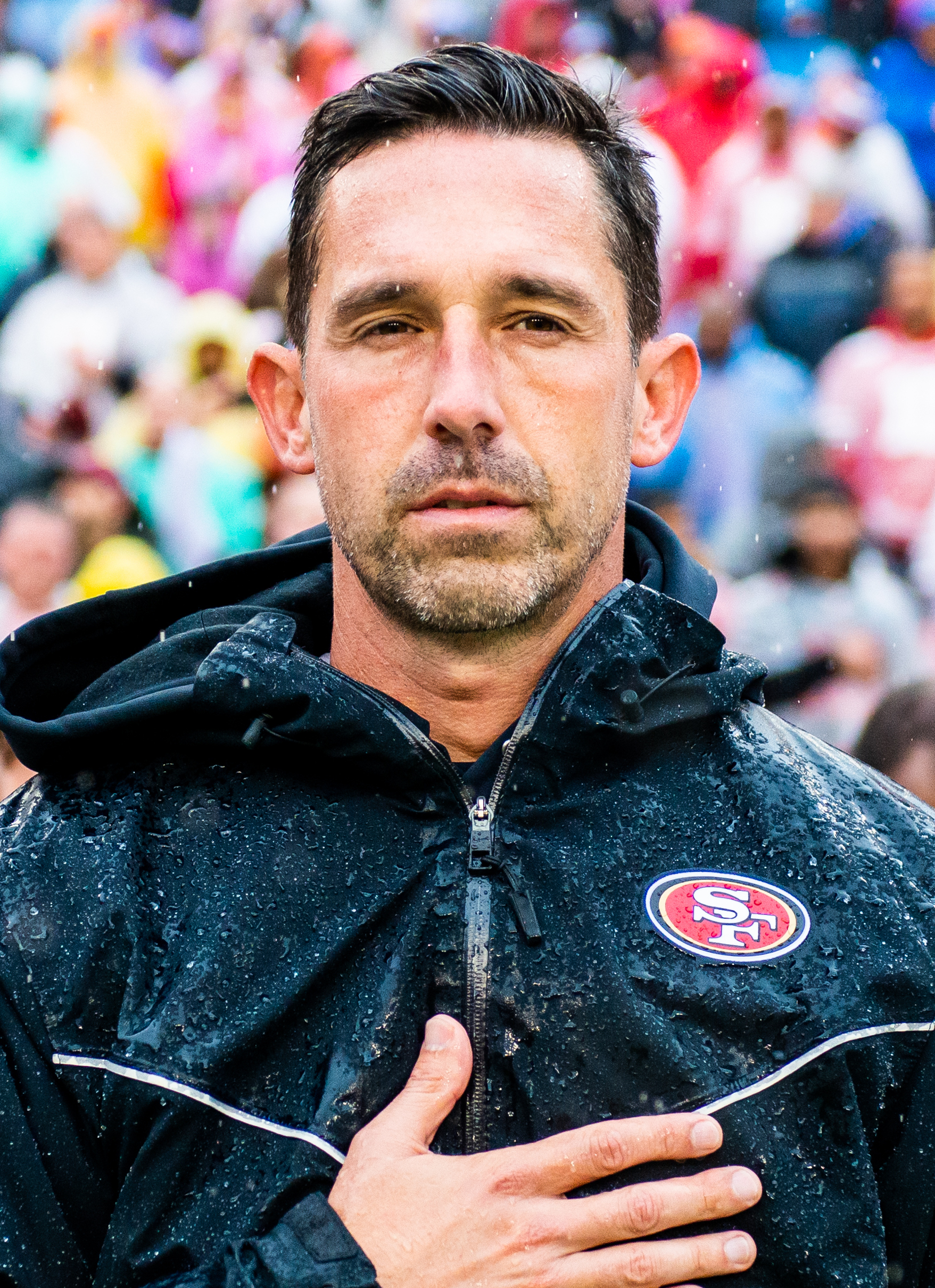
Kyle Shanahan, the current head coach of the San Francisco 49ers.

There have been 20 head coaches in the history of the San Francisco 49ers professional football franchise. The San Francisco 49ers franchise was formed in 1946 as a charter member of the All-America Football Conference (AAFC) before joining the National Football League (NFL) in 1950 after the AAFC merger with the NFL. Buck Shaw became the first head coach of the 49ers in 1946, serving for nine seasons—four in the AAFC and five in the NFL. He coached a number of future College and Pro Football Hall of Famers, such as Frankie Albert, Joe Perry, Leo Nomellini, Y. A. Tittle, Bob St. Clair and Hugh McElhenny.

Bill Walsh is widely considered the most successful 49ers coach. He led the 49ers to playoff appearances in seven seasons, three of which led to the Super Bowl championship, in 1981, 1984 and 1988. Jerry Rice, Joe Montana, Charles Haley, Ronnie Lott, Johnny Davis, Roger Craig, Fred Dean, and Steve Young are among the players Walsh has coached in his career.^{[a]}

Five 49ers coaches—Dick Nolan, Bill Walsh, George Seifert, Jim Harbaugh, and Kyle Shanahan—have been named coach of the year by at least one major news organization. Walsh, Jack Christiansen and Mike Singletary are the only 49ers coaches currently in the Pro Football Hall of Fame. Walsh was selected for his coaching contributions. Singletary and Christiansen were voted into the Hall of Fame primarily for their defensive play. Five times in 49ers history has there been an "interim" head coach. Three games into the 1963 season, coach Red Hickey resigned and was replaced by Jack Christiansen. Christiansen coached the 49ers to a 2–9 record in the remainder of the season and came back to coach the team for four more years. In 1978, Pete McCulley was fired after coaching the 49ers to a 1–8 record. He was replaced by offensive coordinator Fred O'Connor, who was himself fired after leading the 49ers to one win in their final seven games. After a 2–5 start to the 2008 season, Mike Nolan was fired and replaced by Mike Singletary, who finished the season 5–4 and became the official head coach following that season. After a 5–10 start to the 2010 season, Mike Singletary was fired and replaced by Jim Tomsula for the final 49ers game of the 2010 season.

Stanford University head coach Jim Harbaugh succeeded Tomsula as head coach in January 2011, and led the franchise to the NFC Championship Game, where the 49ers lost in overtime to the New York Giants. The following season, the 49ers reached Super Bowl XLVII, where they faced off against the Baltimore Ravens, coached by Jim's older brother John Harbaugh. The 49ers trailed by as many as 22 points during the game, but ultimately lost 34–31 to the Ravens; the 49ers losing a Super Bowl for the first time. In the 2013 season, Harbaugh would lead the 49ers to a 12-4 regular season and the team's third consecutive NFC Championship game, where they would lose to the eventual Super Bowl Champion Seattle Seahawks. Harbaugh would "mutually part ways" with the team after the 2014 season, after the team's first time missing the postseason during his tenure. Following Harbaugh's departure, Jim Tomsula returned as an interim head coach, leading the team to a 5-11 record and was fired after just 1 season. The team then hired the recently fired Philadelphia Eagles head coach, Chip Kelly. In 2016, Kelly would lead the team to a 2-16 record, with a franchise record 13 straight losses from Week 2 to Week 15. Like Tomsula before him, Kelly would be fired after a single season in San Francisco.

In 2017, the 49ers hired Kyle Shanahan as Head Coach. Shanahan's team struggled for the first two years, going 6-10 in 2017 and 4-12 in 2018. In 2019, Shanahan led the 49ers to their first postseason appearance since Harbaugh's departure, opening the season with 8 straight wins and a 13-3 Record. The team would go on to lose Super Bowl LIV to the Kansas City Chiefs, despite having led by 10 points with only 7 minutes remaining in the game. Following an injury ridden 6-10 season, the 49ers would make it to the NFC Championship Game in back to back years in 2021 and 2022, losing to the Los Angeles Rams and Philadelphia Eagles respectively. In 2023, Shanahan would lead the team to Super Bowl LVIII (their second appearance in 5 years), losing again to the Chiefs after briefly leading in overtime.

== Key ==
#	Number of coaches
GC	Games coached
W	Wins
L	Losses
T	Ties
Win%	Winning percentage
†	Elected into the Pro Football Hall of Fame as a coach
‡	Elected into the Pro Football Hall of Fame as a player
*	Spent entire NFL head coaching career with the 49ers

== Coaches ==
Note: Statistics updated through Week 10 of the 2026 NFL season.

#	Image	Name	Term	Regular season					Playoffs			Awards	Reference
#	Image	Name	Term	GC	W	L	T	Win%^{[b]}	GC	W	L	Awards	Reference
1		Buck Shaw	1946–1954	114	71	39	4	.640	2	1	1		
2		Red Strader	1955	12	4	8	0	.333	—	—	—		
3		Frankie Albert*	1956–1958*	36	19	16	1	.542	1	0	1		
4		Red Hickey*	1959–1963*^{[c]}	55	27	27	1	.500	—	—	—		
5		Jack Christiansen ‡*	1963–1967*^{[c]}	67	26	38	3	.410	—	—	—		
6		Dick Nolan	1968–1975	112	54	53	5	.504	5	2	3	1970 Associated Press NFL Coach of the Year	
7		Monte Clark	1976	14	8	6	0	.571	—	—	—		
8		Ken Meyer*	1977*	14	5	9	0	.357	—	—	—		
9		Pete McCulley*	1978^{[d]}*	9	1	8	0	.111	—	—	—		
10		Fred O'Connor*	1978^{[d]}*	7	1	6	0	.143	—	—	—		
11		Bill Walsh †*	1979–1988*	152	92	59	1	.609	14	10	4	1981 Associated Press NFL Coach of the Year; 1981 Sporting News NFL Coach of the Year; 1981 Pro Football Weekly NFL Coach of the Year; 1981 UPI NFL Coach of the Year; 1984 UPI NFL Coach of the Year	
12		George Seifert	1989–1996	128	98	30	0	.766	15	10	5	1989 Pro Football Weekly NFL Coach of the Year; 1990 Sporting News NFL Coach of the Year; 1994 Sporting News NFL Coach of the Year	
13		Steve Mariucci	1997–2002	96	57	39	0	.594	7	3	4		
14		Dennis Erickson	2003–2004	32	9	23	0	.281	—	—	—		
15		Mike Nolan*	2005–2008*^{[e]}	55	18	37	0	.327	—	—	—		
16		Mike Singletary ‡*	2008–2010*^{[e]}^{[f]}	40	18	22	0	.450	—	—	—		
17		Jim Tomsula*	2010* ^{[f]}	1	1	0	0	1.000	—	—	—		
18		Jim Harbaugh	2011–2014	64	44	19	1	.695	8	5	3	2011 Associated Press NFL Coach of the Year; 2011 Sporting News NFL Coach of the Year	
–		Jim Tomsula*	2015*	16	5	11	0	.313	—	—	—		
19		Chip Kelly	2016	16	2	14	0	.125	—	—	—		
20		Kyle Shanahan	2017–present*	158	90	68	0	.570	14	9	5	2019 Sporting News NFL Coach of the Year	

== Notes ==
- ^{a} Joe Montana, Fred Dean, Steve Young and Ronnie Lott are all Hall of Fame players who were coached by Bill Walsh at some point during their career. Charles Haley, who is now a member of the Pro Football Hall of Fame, was selected to five Pro Bowls in his 14-year career. Roger Craig, coached by Walsh from 1983 to 1988, was a four-time Pro Bowl selection. Another one of Walsh's players, wide receiver Jerry Rice, who played from 1985 to 2004, holds NFL records in receptions, receiving yards, touchdown receptions, all-purpose yards and total touchdowns.
- ^{b} The winning percentage is calculated using the formula: $\frac{Wins+\frac{1}{2}Ties}{Games}$
- ^{c} On September 30, 1963, three games into the season, coach Red Hickey resigned and was replaced by Jack Christiansen. Christiansen coached the 49ers to two wins in the 11 remaining games in the season. He coached the 49ers for another four seasons.
- ^{d} Midway through the 1978 season, head coach Pete McCulley was fired after leading the 49ers to a 1–8 record. He was replaced by his offensive coordinator Fred O'Connor, who was himself fired after coaching the 49ers to a 1–6 record during the remainder of the season.
- ^{e} Midway through the 2008 season, Mike Nolan was fired after leading the 49ers to a 2–5 record. He was replaced by his assistant head coach of defense, Mike Singletary.
- ^{f} Before the final game of the 2010 season, Mike Singletary was fired after leading the 49ers to a 5–10 record. He was replaced by his defensive line coach, Jim Tomsula. Following the season, Tomsula returned to his defensive line coaching position and Jim Harbaugh was hired as the new head coach.
