= List of San Francisco 49ers seasons =

The San Francisco 49ers are an American football franchise representing the San Francisco Bay Area. The 49ers are members of the West division in the National Football Conference (NFC) of the National Football League (NFL).

The 49ers began play in 1946 as charter members of the All-America Football Conference. They joined the NFL in the AAFC-NFL merger in 1950; from then through 1969 they did not win a division or conference title, and only finished as high as second once. After winning three consecutive division titles from 1970 to 1972, they would return to losing in 1973 and achieved only one winning season for the rest of the decade.

From 1981 to 1998, the 49ers had one of the most successful stretches of dominance in NFL history. Armed with Bill Walsh's innovative West Coast offense, Hall of Fame level quarterback play in Joe Montana and later Steve Young, and a dominant defense, the 49ers would win five Super Bowls in 1981, 1984, 1988, 1989, and 1994, and made the playoffs every year but 1982 and 1991.

Another playoff drought lasted from 2003–2010, a stretch of eight non-winning seasons. This drought came to end under rookie head coach Jim Harbaugh when the 49ers won their division with a 13–3 record in 2011. From 2011 to 2013, they earned three straight berths in the NFC Championship Game, which included a loss to the Baltimore Ravens in Super Bowl XLVII. They would have another stretch of non-winning seasons from 2014–2018 before a 13–3 turnaround season in 2019 under head coach Kyle Shanahan saw them win the NFC, but lose to the Kansas City Chiefs in Super Bowl LIV. The 2019 season started another run of success for the 49ers; since then, they have been to two NFC Conference Championship Games (NFCCG) and another Super Bowl, losing both NFCCGs on the road (2021, 2022) and losing Super Bowl LVIII once again to the Chiefs.

This list documents the season-by-season record of the 49ers franchise from 1946 to present, including postseason records and league awards for individual players or head coaches.

== Seasons ==
NFL champions (1920–1969)^{§}	Super Bowl champions (1966–present)^{†}	Conference champions^{*}	Division champions^{^}	Wild Card berth^{#}	One-game playoff berth^{+}

San Francisco 49ers seasonal records
Season	Team	League	Conference	Division	Regular season				Postseason results	Awards	Head coach	Refs.
Season	Team	League	Conference	Division	Finish	W	L	T	Postseason results	Awards	Head coach	Refs.
1946	1946	AAFC		Western	2nd	9	5	0			Buck Shaw	
1947	1947	AAFC		Western	2nd	8	4	2			Buck Shaw	
1948	1948	AAFC		Western	2nd	12	2	0			Buck Shaw	
1949	1949	AAFC			2nd^{#}	9	3	0	Won First-Round Playoffs (Yankees) 17–7; Lost AAFC Championship (at Browns) 7–21		Buck Shaw	
1950	1950	NFL	National		5th	3	9	0			Buck Shaw	
1951	1951	NFL	National		3rd	7	4	1			Buck Shaw	
1952	1952	NFL	National		3rd	7	5	0			Buck Shaw	
1953	1953	NFL	Western		3rd	9	3	0			Buck Shaw	
1954	1954	NFL	Western		3rd	7	4	1			Buck Shaw	
1955	1955	NFL	Western		5th	4	8	0			Red Strader	
1956	1956	NFL	Western		3rd	5	6	1			Frankie Albert	
1957	1957	NFL	Western		2nd^{+}	8	4	0	Lost Conference Playoff (Lions) 27–31		Frankie Albert	
1958	1958	NFL	Western		4th	6	6	0			Frankie Albert	
1959	1959	NFL	Western		4th	7	5	0			Red Hickey	
1960	1960	NFL	Western		3rd	7	5	0			Red Hickey	
1961	1961	NFL	Western		5th	7	6	1			Red Hickey	
1962	1962	NFL	Western		5th	6	8	0			Red Hickey	
1963	1963	NFL	Western		7th	2	12	0			Red Hickey (0–3) Jack Christiansen (2–9)	
1964	1964	NFL	Western		7th	4	10	0			Jack Christiansen	
1965	1965	NFL	Western		4th	7	6	1			Jack Christiansen	
1966	1966	NFL	Western		4th	6	6	2			Jack Christiansen	
1967	1967	NFL	Western	Coastal	3rd	7	7	0			Jack Christiansen	
1968	1968	NFL	Western	Coastal	3rd	7	6	1			Dick Nolan	
1969	1969	NFL	Western	Coastal	4th	4	8	2			Dick Nolan	
1970	1970	NFL	NFC	West^{^}	1st^{^}	10	3	1	Won Divisional Playoffs (at Vikings) 17–14; Lost NFC Championship (Cowboys) 10–17	John Brodie (MVP); Bruce Taylor (DROY)	Dick Nolan	
1971	1971	NFL	NFC	West^{^}	1st^{^}	9	5	0	Won Divisional Playoffs (Redskins) 24–20; Lost NFC Championship (at Cowboys) 3–14		Dick Nolan	
1972	1972	NFL	NFC	West^{^}	1st^{^}	8	5	1	Lost Divisional Playoffs (Cowboys) 28–30		Dick Nolan	
1973	1973	NFL	NFC	West	3rd	5	9	0			Dick Nolan	
1974	1974	NFL	NFC	West	2nd	6	8	0			Dick Nolan	
1975	1975	NFL	NFC	West	2nd	5	9	0			Dick Nolan	
1976	1976	NFL	NFC	West	2nd	8	6	0			Monte Clark	
1977	1977	NFL	NFC	West	3rd	5	9	0			Ken Meyer	
1978	1978	NFL	NFC	West	4th	2	14	0			Pete McCulley (1–8) Fred O'Connor (1–6)	
1979	1979	NFL	NFC	West	4th	2	14	0			Bill Walsh	
1980	1980	NFL	NFC	West	3rd	6	10	0			Bill Walsh	
1981	1981	NFL^{†}	NFC^{*}	West^{^}	1st^{^}	13	3	0	Won Divisional Playoffs (Giants) 38–24; Won NFC Championship (Cowboys) 28–27; Won Super Bowl XVI (1) (vs. Bengals) 26–21	Joe Montana (SB MVP); Bill Walsh (COY)	Bill Walsh	
1982	1982	NFL	NFC	West	11th^{1}	3	6	0			Bill Walsh	
1983	1983	NFL	NFC	West^{^}	1st^{^}	10	6	0	Won Divisional Playoffs (Lions) 24–23; Lost NFC Championship (at Redskins) 21–24		Bill Walsh	
1984	1984	NFL^{†}	NFC^{*}	West^{^}	1st^{^}	15	1	0	Won Divisional Playoffs (Giants) 21–10; Won NFC Championship (Bears) 23–0; Won Super Bowl XIX (2) (vs. Dolphins) 38–16	Joe Montana (SB MVP)	Bill Walsh	
1985	1985	NFL	NFC	West	2nd^{#}	10	6	0	Lost Wild Card Playoffs (at Giants) 3–17		Bill Walsh	
1986	1986	NFL	NFC	West^{^}	1st^{^}	10	5	1	Lost Divisional Playoffs (at Giants) 3–49	Joe Montana (CBPOY)	Bill Walsh	
1987	1987	NFL	NFC	West^{^}	1st^{^}	13	2	0	Lost Divisional Playoffs (Vikings) 24–36	Jerry Rice (OPOY)	Bill Walsh	
1988	1988	NFL^{†}	NFC^{*}	West^{^}	1st^{^}	10	6	0	Won Divisional Playoffs (Vikings) 34–9; Won NFC Championship (at Bears) 28–3; Won Super Bowl XXIII (3) (vs. Bengals) 20–16	Jerry Rice (SB MVP); Roger Craig (OPOY)	Bill Walsh	
1989	1989	NFL^{†}	NFC^{*}	West^{^}	1st^{^}	14	2	0	Won Divisional Playoffs (Vikings) 41–13; Won NFC Championship (Rams) 30–3; Won Super Bowl XXIV (4) (vs. Broncos) 55–10	Joe Montana (MVP, SB MVP, OPOY); John McVay (EOY)	George Seifert	
1990	1990	NFL	NFC	West^{^}	1st^{^}	14	2	0	Won Divisional Playoffs (Redskins) 28–10; Lost NFC Championship (Giants) 13–15	Joe Montana (MVP)	George Seifert	
1991	1991	NFL	NFC	West	3rd	10	6	0			George Seifert	
1992	1992	NFL	NFC	West^{^}	1st^{^}	14	2	0	Won Divisional Playoffs (Redskins) 20–13; Lost NFC Championship (Cowboys) 20–30	Steve Young (MVP, OPOY)	George Seifert	
1993	1993	NFL	NFC	West^{^}	1st^{^}	10	6	0	Won Divisional Playoffs (Giants) 44–3; Lost NFC Championship (at Cowboys) 21–38	Jerry Rice (OPOY); Dana Stubblefield (DROY)	George Seifert	
1994	1994	NFL^{†}	NFC^{*}	West^{^}	1st^{^}	13	3	0	Won Divisional Playoffs (Bears) 44–15; Won NFC Championship (Cowboys) 38–28; Won Super Bowl XXIX (5) (vs. Chargers) 49–26	Steve Young (MVP, SB MVP); Deion Sanders (DPOY); Carmen Policy (EOY)	George Seifert	
1995	1995	NFL	NFC	West^{^}	1st^{^}	11	5	0	Lost Divisional Playoffs (Packers) 17–27	Jerry Rice (PB MVP)	George Seifert	
1996	1996	NFL	NFC	West	2nd^{#}	12	4	0	Won Wild Card Playoffs (Eagles) 14–0; Lost Divisional Playoffs (at Packers) 14–35		George Seifert	
1997	1997	NFL	NFC	West^{^}	1st^{^}	13	3	0	Won Divisional Playoffs (Vikings) 38–22; Lost NFC Championship (Packers) 10–23	Dana Stubblefield (DPOY)	Steve Mariucci	
1998	1998	NFL	NFC	West	2nd^{#}	12	4	0	Won Wild Card Playoffs (Packers) 30–27; Lost Divisional Playoffs (at Falcons) 18–20		Steve Mariucci	
1999	1999	NFL	NFC	West	4th	4	12	0		Bryant Young (CBPOY)	Steve Mariucci	
2000	2000	NFL	NFC	West	4th	6	10	0			Steve Mariucci	
2001	2001	NFL	NFC	West	2nd^{#}	12	4	0	Lost Wild Card Playoffs (at Packers) 15–25	Garrison Hearst (CBPOY)	Steve Mariucci	
2002	2002	NFL	NFC	West^{^}	1st^{^}	10	6	0	Won Wild Card Playoffs (Giants) 39–38; Lost Divisional Playoffs (at Buccaneers) 6–31		Steve Mariucci	
2003	2003	NFL	NFC	West	3rd	7	9	0			Dennis Erickson	
2004	2004	NFL	NFC	West	4th	2	14	0			Dennis Erickson	
2005	2005	NFL	NFC	West	4th	4	12	0			Mike Nolan	
2006	2006	NFL	NFC	West	3rd	7	9	0			Mike Nolan	
2007	2007	NFL	NFC	West	3rd	5	11	0		Patrick Willis (DROY)	Mike Nolan	
2008	2008	NFL	NFC	West	2nd	7	9	0			Mike Nolan (2–5) Mike Singletary (5–4)	
2009	2009	NFL	NFC	West	2nd	8	8	0			Mike Singletary	
2010	2010	NFL	NFC	West	3rd	6	10	0			Mike Singletary (5–10) Jim Tomsula (1–0)	
2011	2011	NFL	NFC	West^{^}	1st^{^}	13	3	0	Won Divisional Playoffs (Saints) 36–32; Lost NFC Championship (Giants) 17–20 (OT)	Jim Harbaugh (COY)	Jim Harbaugh	
2012	2012	NFL	NFC^{*}	West^{^}	1st^{^}	11	4	1	Won Divisional Playoffs (Packers) 45–31; Won NFC Championship (at Falcons) 28–24; Lost Super Bowl XLVII (vs. Ravens) 31–34		Jim Harbaugh	
2013	2013	NFL	NFC	West	2nd^{#}	12	4	0	Won Wild Card Playoffs (at Packers) 23–20; Won Divisional Playoffs (at Panthers) 23–10; Lost NFC Championship (at Seahawks) 17–23		Jim Harbaugh	
2014	2014	NFL	NFC	West	3rd	8	8	0			Jim Harbaugh	
2015	2015	NFL	NFC	West	4th	5	11	0		Anquan Boldin (MOY)	Jim Tomsula	
2016	2016	NFL	NFC	West	4th	2	14	0			Chip Kelly	
2017	2017	NFL	NFC	West	4th	6	10	0			Kyle Shanahan	
2018	2018	NFL	NFC	West	3rd	4	12	0			Kyle Shanahan	
2019	2019	NFL	NFC^{*}	West^{^}	1st^{^}	13	3	0	Won Divisional Playoffs (Vikings) 27–10; Won NFC Championship (Packers) 37–20; Lost Super Bowl LIV (vs. Chiefs) 20–31	Nick Bosa (DROY)	Kyle Shanahan	
2020	2020	NFL	NFC	West	4th	6	10	0			Kyle Shanahan	
2021	2021	NFL	NFC	West	3rd^{#}	10	7	0	Won Wild Card Playoffs (at Cowboys) 23–17; Won Divisional Playoffs (at Packers) 13–10; Lost NFC Championship (at Rams) 17–20		Kyle Shanahan	
2022	2022	NFL	NFC	West^{^}	1st^{^}	13	4	0	Won Wild Card Playoffs (Seahawks) 41–23; Won Divisional Playoffs (Cowboys) 19–12; Lost NFC Championship (at Eagles) 7–31	Nick Bosa (DPOY)	Kyle Shanahan	
2023	2023	NFL	NFC^{*}	West^{^}	1st^{^}	12	5	0	Won Divisional Playoffs (Packers) 24–21; Won NFC Championship (Lions) 34–31; Lost Super Bowl LVIII (vs. Chiefs) 22–25 (OT)	Christian McCaffrey (OPOY)	Kyle Shanahan	
2024	2024	NFL	NFC	West	4th	6	11	0			Kyle Shanahan	
2025	2025	NFL	NFC	West	3rd^{#}	12	5	0	Won Wild Card Playoffs (at Eagles) 23–19; Lost Divisional Playoffs (at Seahawks) 6–41	Christian McCaffrey (CBPOY)	Kyle Shanahan	

Statistics above are current as of January 17, 2026.

== All-time records ==
Statistic	Wins	Losses	Ties	Win %
All-America Football Conference regular season record	38	14	2	.722
AAFC postseason record	1	1	—	.500
National Football League regular season record	592	512	14	.536
NFL postseason record	39	25	—	.609
AAFC and NFL regular and postseason record	670	552	16	.548

^{1} Due to a strike-shortened season in 1982, all teams were ranked by conference instead of division.
