= 1978 San Francisco 49ers season =

American football team season

- Owner: Edward J. DeBartolo, Jr.
- General manager: Joe Thomas
- Head coach: Pete McCulley; Fred O'Connor (interim)
- Offensive coordinator: Fred O'Connor
- Defensive coordinator: Dan Radakovich
- Home stadium: Candlestick Park

Results
- Record: 2–14
- Division place: 4th NFC West
- Playoffs: Did not qualify
- Pro Bowlers: none

Uniform
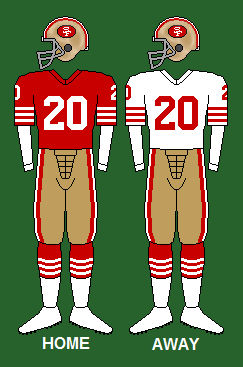

The 1978 San Francisco 49ers season was the franchise's 29th season in the National Football League, their 33rd overall, and their second and final season under general manager Joe Thomas, who was fired following the end of the season. The Niners' 2–14 record was the worst in the NFL in 1978 and tied for the worst in franchise history with the 1979, 2004, and 2016 seasons, dating back to the team's origins in the All America Football Conference (AAFC) in 1946.

== Season history ==
The team began the season hoping to improve upon their previous output of 5–9. Instead, the team started the season 0–4 for the second straight year. The team also suffered a nine-game losing streak.

During the off-season, the 49ers acquired running back O. J. Simpson, who originally hailed from San Francisco, from the Buffalo Bills. Although Simpson had been one of the best backs in the league over the previous decade, he was in poor physical condition and had recently undergone knee surgery. As a result, his playing ability was limited.

Interim head coach Fred O'Connor was hired in the middle of the team's season after first-season head coach Pete McCulley posted an unremarkable 1–8 record. However, after the season ended, O'Connor was let go along with the coaching staff, who had been hired by McCulley.

The 49ers finished with the worst record in the league and scored only 219 points, the fewest in the league in 1978. Making matters worse is that the club was unable to benefit from their miserable performance in the 1979 NFL draft, with the team's first pick already traded to the Bills as part of the O.J. Simpson deal.

The 1978 team set an NFL record with 63 turnovers.

== Offseason ==
=== NFL draft ===
1978 San Francisco 49ers draft
| Round | Pick | Player | Position | College | Notes |
| 1 | 7 | Ken MacAfee | Tight end | Notre Dame | |
| 1 | 24 | Dan Bunz | Linebacker | Long Beach State | |
| 2 | 47 | Walt Downing | Guard | Michigan | |
| 3 | 79 | Ernie Hughes | Center | Notre Dame | |
| 4 | 91 | Terry LeCount | Wide receiver | Florida | |
| 5 | 127 | Archie Reese | Defensive end | Clemson | |
| 5 | 133 | Bruce Threadgill | Defensive back | Mississippi State | |
| 6 | 148 | Elliott Walker | Running back | Pittsburgh | |
| 7 | 175 | Fred Quillan | Center | Oregon | |
| 9 | 229 | Herman Redden | Defensive back | Howard | |
| 9 | 233 | Dean Moore | Linebacker | Iowa | |
| 9 | 249 | Steve McDaniels | Tackle | Notre Dame | |
| 10 | 260 | Mike Connell | Punter | Cincinnati | |
| 11 | 287 | Willie McCray | Defensive end | Troy State | |
| 12 | 314 | Dan Irons | Tackle | Texas Tech | |
Made roster * Made at least one Pro Bowl during career

== Personnel ==
=== Staff / Coaches ===
1978 San Francisco 49ers staff
| Front office: Owner and President – Edward J. DeBartolo, Jr.; General manager – Joe Thomas; Head coaches: Head coach – Pete McCulley; Offensive coaches: Offensive coordinator – Fred O'Connor; Receivers – Les Steckel; Offensive line – Mike White | Defensive coaches: Defensive coordinator/linebackers – Dan Radakovich; Defensive line – Earl Leggett; Defensive backfield – Jimmy Carr; Special teams coaches: Special teams – Frank Gansz; Strength and conditioning: Strength and Conditioning – Floyd Reese |

=== Roster ===
1978 San Francisco 49ers roster
| Quarterbacks (QB): 19 Scott Bull; 17 Steve DeBerg; Running backs (RB): 33 Greg Boykin; 31 Earl Carr; 38 Bob Ferrell; 36 Paul Hofer; 32 O. J. Simpson; 35 Elliott Walker; 30 Dave Williams; Wide receivers (WR): 83 Kenny Harrison; 84 Mike Shumann; 88 Freddie Solomon; 87 Jack Steptoe; Tight ends (TE): 82 Lon Boyett; 85 Paul Seal | Offensive linemen (OL): 63 Tony Ardizzone C; 68 John Ayers G/T; 64 Kyle Davis C; 62 Walt Downing G; 71 Keith Fahnhorst T; 65 Ernie Hughes G; 60 Steve Knutson T/G; 56 Fred Quillan C; 67 Ron Singleton T; Defensive linemen (DL): 72 Cleveland Elam DE/DT; 75 Ed Galigher DT; 86 Cedrick Hardman DE; 76 Willie McCray DE; 78 Archie Reese DE; 74 Jimmy Webb DT | Linebackers (LB): 52 Mike Baldassin OLB; 54 Ed Bradley OLB; 57 Dan Bunz MLB; 55 Bruce Elia MLB; 50 Joe Harris OLB; 53 Dean Moore OLB; 58 Mark Nichols OLB; Defensive backs (DB): 24 Chuck Crist FS; 26 Bob Jury SS; 22 Eddie Lewis CB; 25 Wonder Monds SS; 42 Ricky Odom CB; 49 Vern Roberson FS/CB; 23 Bruce Threadgill FS; Special teams (ST): 10 Mike Connell P; 14 Ray Wersching K | Reserve: 77 Jean Barrett T (IR); 51 Randy Cross C (IR); 59 Willie Harper LB (IR); -- Dan Irons T (IR); 40 Wilbur Jackson RB (IR); 80 Terry LeCount WR (IR); 81 Ken MacAfee TE (IR); 66 Johnny Miller G (IR); -- Herman Redden CB (IR); Rookies in italics |

== Preseason ==
| Week | Date | Opponent | Result | Record | Venue | Attendance |
|---|---|---|---|---|---|---|
| 1 | August 5 | at Dallas Cowboys | L 24–41 | 0–2 | Texas Stadium | 63,736 |
| 2 | August 12 | Seattle Seahawks | L 6–20 | 0–2 | Candlestick Park | 36,069 |
| 3 | August 20 | Oakland Raiders | L 14–31 | 0–3 | Candlestick Park | 58,658 |
| 4 | August 25 | at Denver Broncos | W 24–13 | 1–3 | Mile High Stadium | 73,559 |

== Schedule ==
| Week | Date | Opponent | Result | Record | Venue | Attendance |
|---|---|---|---|---|---|---|
| 1 | September 3 | at Cleveland Browns | **L** 7–24 | 0–1 | Cleveland Municipal Stadium | 68,973 |
| 2 | September 10 | Chicago Bears | **L** 13–16 | 0–2 | Candlestick Park | 49,502 |
| 3 | September 17 | at Houston Oilers | **L** 19–20 | 0–3 | Houston Astrodome | 46,161 |
| 4 | September 24 | at New York Giants | **L** 10–27 | 0–4 | Giants Stadium | 71,536 |
| 5 | October 1 | Cincinnati Bengals | **W** 28–12 | 1–4 | Candlestick Park | 41,107 |
| 6 | October 8 | at **Los Angeles Rams** | **L** 10–27 | 1–5 | Los Angeles Memorial Coliseum | 59,337 |
| 7 | October 15 | **New Orleans Saints** | **L** 7–14 | 1–6 | Candlestick Park | 37,671 |
| 8 | October 22 | **Atlanta Falcons** | **L** 17–20 | 1–7 | Candlestick Park | 44,235 |
| 9 | October 29 | at Washington Redskins | **L** 20–38 | 1–8 | RFK Stadium | 53,706 |
| 10 | November 5 | at **Atlanta Falcons** | **L** 10–21 | 1–9 | Atlanta–Fulton County Stadium | 55,468 |
| 11 | November 12 | St. Louis Cardinals | **L** 10–16 | 1–10 | Candlestick Park | 33,155 |
| 12 | November 19 | **Los Angeles Rams** | **L** 28–31 | 1–11 | Candlestick Park | 45,022 |
| 13 | November 27 | Pittsburgh Steelers | **L** 7–24 | 1–12 | Candlestick Park | 51,657 |
| 14 | December 3 | at **New Orleans Saints** | **L** 13–24 | 1–13 | Louisiana Superdome | 50,068 |
| 15 | December 10 | Tampa Bay Buccaneers | **W** 6–3 | 2–13 | Candlestick Park | 30,931 |
| 16 | December 17 | at Detroit Lions | **L** 14–33 | 2–14 | Pontiac Silverdome | 56,674 |
Note: Intra-division opponents are in **bold** text.

=== Standings ===
NFC West
| | W | L | T | PCT | DIV | CONF | PF | PA | STK |
|---|---|---|---|---|---|---|---|---|---|
| ^{(1)} Los Angeles Rams | 12 | 4 | 0 | .750 | 4–2 | 10–2 | 316 | 245 | W1 |
| ^{(4)} Atlanta Falcons | 9 | 7 | 0 | .563 | 5–1 | 8–4 | 240 | 290 | L1 |
| New Orleans Saints | 7 | 9 | 0 | .438 | 3–3 | 6–6 | 281 | 298 | W1 |
| San Francisco 49ers | 2 | 14 | 0 | .125 | 0–6 | 1–11 | 219 | 350 | L1 |
