= 1977 Atlanta Falcons season =

NFL team season

- Owner: Rankin M. Smith Sr.
- General manager: Eddie LeBaron
- Head coach: Leeman Bennett
- Home stadium: Fulton County Stadium

Results
- Record: 7–7
- Division place: 2nd NFC West
- Playoffs: Did not qualify
- Pro Bowlers: CB Rolland Lawrence; DE Claude Humphrey; P John James

The 1977 Atlanta Falcons season was the team's 12th year in the National Football League. The team finished the season .500, and did not qualify for the playoffs.

Although the Falcons' offense struggled, the defense, nicknamed "Grits Blitz", was dominant. The Falcons' 129 points allowed led the league (the best ever for a 14 game regular season) and established an all-time NFL record for fewest points allowed in an NFL season. Atlanta's 3,242 total yards allowed were second-fewest in the league, and the Falcons' 1,384 passing yards allowed was by far the best in the NFL in 1977.

== Offseason ==
=== NFL draft ===
1977 Atlanta Falcons draft
Round	Pick	Player	Position	College	Notes
1	6	Warren Bryant	OT	Kentucky	
1	20	Wilson Faumuina	DT	San Jose State	from St. Louis
2	36	R. C. Thielemann *	G	Arkansas	
4	90	Allan Leavitt	K	Georgia	
5	120	Shelton Diggs	WR	USC	
6	161	Keith Jenkins	DB	Cincinnati	from Washington
8	203	Walter Packer	WR	Mississippi State	
9	230	John Maxwell	OT	Boston College	
9	242	Robert Speer	DE	Arkansas State	from Washington
10	257	Billy Ryckman	WR	Louisiana Tech	
11	287	Dave Farmer	RB	USC	
Made roster * Made at least one Pro Bowl during career

== Personnel ==
=== Staff / Coaches ===
1977 Atlanta Falcons staff
Front office: Chairman of the board – Rankin M. Smith Sr.; President – Rankin M. Smith, Jr.; General manager – Eddie LeBaron; Director of player personnel – Tom Braatz; Head coaches: Head coach – Leeman Bennett; Offensive coaches: Quarterbacks/receivers – Ted Plumb; Offensive backs – John North; Offensive line – Bill Walsh	Defensive coaches: Defensive line – Jim Champion; Linebackers – Doug Shively; Defensive backs – Jerry Glanville

=== Roster ===
1977 Atlanta Falcons roster
Quarterbacks (QB): 10 Steve Bartkowski; 14 June Jones; 11 Kim McQuilken; Running backs (RB): 26 Mike Esposito; 41 Secdrick McIntyre; 39 Billy Pritchett; 24 Haskel Stanback; 48 Woody Thompson; Wide receivers (WR): 80 Karl Farmer; 89 Wallace Francis; 84 Alfred Jenkins; 82 Billy Ryckman; Tight ends (TE): 88 Greg McCrary; 86 Jim Mitchell	Offensive linemen (OL): 61 Brent Adams T; 66 Warren Bryant T; 63 Bob Jordan G; 73 Phil McKinnely T; 53 Paul Ryczek C; 70 Dave Scott G; 68 R. C. Thielemann G; 57 Jeff Van Note C; Defensive linemen (DL): 72 Jim Bailey DT; 74 Wilson Faumuina DT; 77 Edgar Fields DE; 87 Claude Humphrey DE; 69 Mike Lewis DT; 75 Jeff Merrow DE; 79 Jeff Yeates DE	Linebackers (LB): 50 Greg Brezina OLB; 58 Rick Kay OLB; 56 Ron McCartney OLB; 52 Dewey McClain OLB; 55 Ralph Ortega MLB; 51 Andy Spiva MLB; 59 Robert Pennywell MLB; Defensive backs (DB): 34 Ray Brown SS; 38 Rick Byas CB; 32 Ray Easterling FS; 22 Rolland Lawrence CB; 45 Tom Moriarty SS; 28 Frank Reed CB; Special teams (ST): 6 John James P; 1 Fred Steinfort K	Reserve: 44 Bubba Bean RB (IR); -- Jim Duggan LB (IR); 46 Monroe Eley RB (IR); -- Dave Farmer FB (IR); 65 Len Gotshalk T (IR); 16 Scott Hunter QB (IR); 54 Fulton Kuykendall LB (IR); -- Don Parrish DT (IR); Rookies in italics 44 active, 8 reserve, 0 practice squad

== Regular season ==
=== Schedule ===
Week	Date	Opponent	Result	Record	Venue	Attendance
1	September 18	**Los Angeles Rams**	**W** 17–6	1–0	Atlanta–Fulton County Stadium	55,956
2	September 25	at Washington Redskins	**L** 6–10	1–1	RFK Stadium	55,031
3	October 2	New York Giants	**W** 17–3	2–1	Atlanta–Fulton County Stadium	46,374
4	October 9	at **San Francisco 49ers**	**W** 7–0	3–1	Candlestick Park	38,009
5	October 16	at Buffalo Bills	**L** 0–3	3–2	Rich Stadium	27,348
6	October 23	at Chicago Bears	**W** 16–10	4–2	Soldier Field	49,407
7	October 30	Minnesota Vikings	**L** 7–14	4–3	Atlanta–Fulton County Stadium	59,257
8	November 6	**San Francisco 49ers**	**L** 3–10	4–4	Atlanta–Fulton County Stadium	46,577
9	November 13	Detroit Lions	**W** 17–6	5–4	Atlanta–Fulton County Stadium	47,461
10	November 20	at **New Orleans Saints**	**L** 20–21	5–5	Louisiana Superdome	43,135
11	November 27	at Tampa Bay Buccaneers	**W** 17–0	6–5	Tampa Stadium	43,592
12	December 4	New England Patriots	**L** 10–16	6–6	Atlanta–Fulton County Stadium	57,911
13	December 11	at **Los Angeles Rams**	**L** 7–23	6–7	Los Angeles Memorial Coliseum	52,574
14	December 18	**New Orleans Saints**	**W** 35–7	7–7	Atlanta–Fulton County Stadium	36,895
Note: Intra-division opponents are in **bold** text.

=== Game summaries ===
==== Week 1 ====
- Date: September 18
- Television: CBS
- Announcers: Vin Scully

The Falcons pulled a Week 1 surprise at home against the heavily-favored Rams, who opened the season with new quarterback Joe Namath. The Falcons shut down the Rams' vaunted running game, holding them to 59 yards. Namath had an early touchdown pass, but threw for only 141 yards otherwise and was sacked three times. Falcons' opening day starter Scott Hunter played close to the vest, completing 10 of 17 passes and running for a touchdown.

==== Week 4 ====
- Date: October 9
- Television: CBS
- Announcers: Don Criqui, Tom Matte

The Atlanta Falcons, with the NFL's leading defensive unit, have now allowed just 19 points in four games while climbing to the top of the NFC West with a 3-1 record. A 39-yard touchdown pass from Scott Hunter to Alfred Jenkins was the only score in the game and was set up when Edgar Fields blocked a punt by San Francisco's Tom Wittum. The Falcons' Rolland Lawrence had both an interception return touchdown and fumble return touchdown called back by offsides penalties.

==== Week 11 ====
- Date: November 27
- Television: CBS
- Announcers: Bob Costas, Emerson Boozer

The Falcons had possession of the ball nine times inside Tampa Bay 40, four times as a result of turnovers. Four times they marched to the Tampa Bay 20, scoring on three possessions. Two one-yard scoring plunges by Haskel Stanback and a 26-Yard field goal by Fred Stemfort and the Falcons ran out the clock at the Tampa Bay 19 to preserve their 6th win of '77. "I was pleased with the way we controlled the ball and the clock", said coach Leeman Bennett, "Our defense we're outstanding. They went in for three plays and we're out again quite a few times".

==== Week 14 ====
- Date: December 18
- Television: CBS
- Announcers: Lindsey Nelson, Paul Hornung

The Falcons had their most productive offensive game of the season as they scored 35 points, their most in a game since they scored that many in week 10 of 1975 against the Denver Broncos. Haskel Stanback ran for 129 yards and 2 touchdowns from 2 and 7 yards out, while Steve Bartkowski passed for 2 touchdowns, one from 27 yards to Secdrick Mclntyre and the other from 5 yards to Billy Ryckman. But the story was that the Falcons allowed the Saints only 7 points, and finished with a new NFL record for fewest points allowed in a season by a team, 129, breaking the Minnesota Vikings of 1969's 133 points allowed. After the game the Saints fired Hank Stram as head coach.

=== Standings ===
NFC West
	W	L	T	PCT	DIV	CONF	PF	PA	STK
Los Angeles Rams^{(2)}	10	4	0	.714	4–2	8–4	302	146	L1
Atlanta Falcons	7	7	0	.500	3–3	7–5	179	129	W1
San Francisco 49ers	5	9	0	.357	3–3	5–7	220	260	L3
New Orleans Saints	3	11	0	.214	2–4	3–9	232	336	L4

== Defensive legacy ==
Arguably the most famous personality on the 1977 Falcons was defensive assistant Jerry Glanville, who installed in a swarming style of play in Atlanta remembered as the "Grits Blitz" defense. Football analytics site Cold Hard Football Facts calls the 1977 Falcons "the stingiest defense of the Super Bowl Era" and "the stingiest defense since World War II." Atlanta surrendered just 9.2 points-per-game, or a total of 129 points in the 14-game season (both all-time records). Against the Falcons, teams scored 7 or fewer points in half (7) of the games, and scored more than 16 points only twice. Atlanta's defense intercepted 26 passes, allowed just nine touchdown passes, and recovered 22 fumbles.

Despite its status as the stingiest defense since the 1944 New York Giants, the Falcons sent only two defenders to the Pro Bowl in 1977: cornerback Rolland Lawrence and defensive end Claude Humphrey. The 1976 Falcons possessed one of the worst defenses in the league (22.3 PPG) and largely fell apart in 1978 (18.1 PPG), therefore making the 1977 defense a "one-hit wonder".

== Awards and records ==
=== Milestones ===
- Jerry Glanville's "Grits Blitz" defense set the NFL record for fewest points allowed per game since the 1970 AFL-NFL Merger (129 points on a 14-game schedule, an average of 9.2 per game).
