= 1977 New Orleans Saints season =

NFL team season

- Head coach: Hank Stram
- Home stadium: Louisiana Superdome

Results
- Record: 3–11
- Division place: 4th NFC West
- Playoffs: Did not qualify
- Pro Bowlers: None

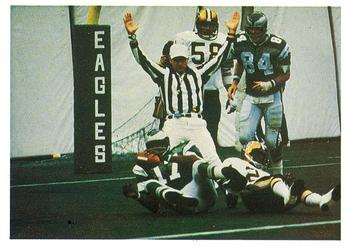
The Saints playing against the Philadelphia Eagles at Veterans Stadium in 1977

The 1977 New Orleans Saints season was the team's eleventh as a member of the National Football League. They were unable to improve on their previous season's output of 4–10, winning only three games. The most notable part of the season was when they lost to the Tampa Bay Buccaneers, who won their first game in franchise history after losing their first 26 games. The team failed to qualify for the playoffs for the eleventh consecutive season, while coach Hank Stram was fired following the season. In his two seasons as coach the Saints only won seven games.

== Offseason ==
=== NFL draft ===
1977 New Orleans Saints draft
Round	Pick	Player	Position	College	Notes
1	7	Joe Campbell	Defensive end	Maryland	
2	34	Mike Fultz	Defensive tackle	Nebraska	
3	64	Robert Watts	Linebacker	Boston College	
5	118	Dave LaFary	Offensive tackle	Purdue	
5	135	Dave Hubbard	Tackle	Brigham Young	
6	147	Cliff Parsley	Punter	Oklahoma State	
6	162	Tom Schick	Guard	Maryland	
7	174	Greg Boykin	Running back	Northwestern	
8	201	Jimmy Stewart	Running back	Tulsa	
9	231	Dave Knowles	Tackle	Indiana	
10	258	Rafael Septién (Note: Never played a game with the Saints, but played in the Pro Bowl in 1982 with the Dallas Cowboys.) *	Kicker	Southwestern Louisiana	
11	285	John Blain	Tackle	San Jose State	
12	315	Oakley Dalton	Defensive tackle	Jackson State	
Made roster * Made at least one Pro Bowl during career

== Personnel ==
=== Staff ===
1977 New Orleans Saints staff
Front office: President – John W. Mecom, Jr.; Vice-president of administration – Harry Hulmes; Vice-president and treasurer – Eddie Jones; Head coaches: Vice-president/head coach – Hank Stram; Offensive coaches: Quarterbacks – Dick Wood; Offensive backfield – John Beake; Receivers – Sam Rutigliano; Offensive line – Dick Stanfel; Quality control – Rich Kotite	Defensive coaches: Defensive line – Buck Buchanan; Linebackers – Dick Nolan; Defensive backfield – Jim Garrett; Special teams coaches: Special teams – Whitey Campbell; Strength and conditioning: Strength and Conditioning – Alvin Roy

=== Roster ===
1977 New Orleans Saints roster
Quarterbacks (QB): 10 Bobby Douglass; 8 Archie Manning; 12 Bobby Scott; Running backs (RB): 36 Greg Boykin; 34 Tony Galbreath; 32 Kim Jones; 42 Chuck Muncie; 33 Mike Strachan; Wide receivers (WR): 41 John Gilliam; 87 Don Herrmann; 84 Rich Mauti; Tight ends (TE): 85 Henry Childs; 86 Jim Thaxton	Offensive linemen (OL): 56 Lee Gross C; 62 John Hill C; 70 Dave Hubbard T; 64 Dave Lafary G; 77 Marv Montgomery T; 76 Don Morrison T; 71 Kurt Schumacher G; 68 Terry Stieve G; 63 Mike Watson T; 65 Robert Woods T; 79 Emanuel Zanders G; Defensive linemen (DL): 73 Joe Campbell DE; 69 Oakley Dalton DT; 72 Mike Fultz DT; 78 Elois Grooms DE; 82 Bob Pollard DE; 75 Elex Price DT	Linebackers (LB): 50 Ken Bordelon OLB; 58 Joe Federspiel MLB; 54 Pat Hughes OLB; 53 Rick Kingrea MLB; 57 Jim Merlo OLB; 60 Greg Westbrooks OLB; Defensive backs (DB): 25 Wade Bosarge SS; 23 Craig Cassady CB; 24 Clarence Chapman CB; 44 Chuck Crist SS; 30 Ernie Jackson CB; 40 Jim Marsalis FS; 37 Tom Myers FS; Special teams (ST): 16 Tom Blanchard P; 15 Rich Szaro K	Reserve: 80 Larry Burton WR (IR); -- Dave Knowles T (IR); 74 Derland Moore DT (IR); 83 Tinker Owens WR (IR); 88 Joel Parker WR (IR); 29 Mo Spencer CB (IR); 26 Jimmy Stewart S (IR); 67 John Watson T (IR); 59 Bob Watts LB (IR); Rookies in italics

== Regular season ==
The first victory overall for the Tampa Bay Buccaneers, did not come until week 13 on the road against the Saints, almost two seasons after their first game against the Houston Oilers in 1976. The Bucs led at halftime by a score of 13–0. Dave Green had two field goals, while Gary Huff threw a touchdown pass to Morris Owens. Upon their arrival in Tampa Bay, the Bucs were greeted by 8,000 fans.

The Saints were 11-point favorites before the game, and fans booed as the Buccaneers scored. "Eleven years I've supported this franchise!" one shouted, adding, "With all this money I've spent on this lousy team I could have bought some land in Colombia and raised pot." Losing to a team with a 0–26 losing streak was so humiliating that safety Tom Myers said, "We've been made the laughingstocks of the business ... I'm too embarrassed to say that I play for the team that got beat by Tampa Bay." Said head coach Hank Stram, "We're all very ashamed of what happened today. Ashamed for our people, for our fans, the organization, everybody. It is my worst coaching experience." Team owner John Mecom said during the loss that the Saints "is a poorly coached team", and Stram was fired January 28, 1978.

=== Schedule ===
Week	Date	Opponent	Result	Record	Venue	Attendance
1	September 18	Green Bay Packers	**L** 20–24	0–1	Louisiana Superdome	56,250
2	September 25	at Detroit Lions	**L** 19–23	0–2	Pontiac Silverdome	51,458
3	October 2	at Chicago Bears	**W** 42–24	1–2	Soldier Field	51,488
4	October 9	San Diego Chargers	**L** 0–14	1–3	Louisiana Superdome	53,942
5	October 16	at Los Angeles Rams	**L** 7–14	1–4	Los Angeles Memorial Coliseum	46,045
6	October 23	at St. Louis Cardinals	**L** 31–49	1–5	Busch Memorial Stadium	48,417
7	October 30	Los Angeles Rams	**W** 27–26	2–5	Louisiana Superdome	59,023
8	November 6	at Philadelphia Eagles	**L** 7–28	2–6	Veterans Stadium	53,482
9	November 13	San Francisco 49ers	**L** 7–10	2–7	Louisiana Superdome	41,564
10	November 20	Atlanta Falcons	**W** 21–20	3–7	Louisiana Superdome	43,135
11	November 27	at San Francisco 49ers	**L** 17–20	3–8	Candlestick Park	33,702
12	December 4	New York Jets	**L** 13–16	3–9	Louisiana Superdome	40,464
13	December 11	Tampa Bay Buccaneers	**L** 14–33	3–10	Louisiana Superdome	40,124
14	December 18	at Atlanta Falcons	**L** 7–35	3–11	Atlanta–Fulton County Stadium	36,895
Note: Intra-division opponents are in **bold** text.

==== Season summary ====
===== Week 1: vs Green Bay Packers =====
Week 1: Green Bay Packers at New Orleans Saints

Quarter	1	2	3	4	Total
**Packers**	14	10	0	0	**24**
Saints	0	0	14	6	**20**

at Louisiana Superdome, New Orleans, Louisiana

- Date: September 18, 1977
- Game time: 12:00 p.m. CST
- Game weather: Dome
- TV announcers (CBS): Tim Ryan and Nick Buoniconti

Game information

**First quarter**

**Second quarter**

**Third quarter**

**Fourth quarter**

Top passers

- GB – Lynn Dickey – 11/20, 142 yards, TD, INT
- NO – Archie Manning – 18/30, 225 yards, TD, INT

Top rushers

- GB – Eric Torkelson – 12 rushes, 27 yards
- NO – Chuck Muncie – 20 rushes, 86 yards, 2 TD

Top receivers

- GB – Ken Payne – 3 receptions, 71 yards, TD
- NO – Henry Childs – 5 receptions, 83 yards, TD

===== Week 3 at Chicago Bears =====
Week 3: New Orleans Saints at Chicago Bears

Quarter	1	2	3	4	Total
**Saints**	7	14	14	14	**49**
Bears	7	3	0	14	**24**

at Soldier Field, Chicago, Illinois

- Date: October 2, 1977
- Game time: 12:00 p.m. CST
- Game weather: Overcast, 56 °F (13 °C)
- TV announcers (CBS): Don Criqui and Emerson Boozer

Game information

**First quarter**

**Second quarter**

**Third quarter**

**Fourth quarter**

Top passers

- NO – Archie Manning – 8/17, 168 yards, TD
- CHI – Bob Avellini – 18/38, 238 yards, TD, 2 INT

Top rushers

- NO – Tony Galbreath – 21 rushes, 61 yards
- CHI – Walter Payton – 19 rushes, 140 yards, 2 TD

Top receivers

- NO – Jim Thaxton – 3 receptions, 63 yards
- CHI – Bo Rather – 6 receptions, 113 yards

===== Week 4: vs San Diego Chargers =====
Week Four: San Diego Chargers at New Orleans Saints – Game summary

Quarter	1	2	3	4	Total
**Chargers**	7	0	0	7	**14**
Saints	0	0	0	0	**0**

at Louisiana Superdome, New Orleans, Louisiana

- Date: October 9
- Game time: 1:00 p.m. CDT
- Game weather: N/A (game played indoors)
- Game attendance: 53,942
- Referee: Pat Haggerty
- TV announcers (NBC): Stu Nahan and Len Dawson
- Box score

Game information

**First quarter**

- SDG – Mike Fuller 88-yard punt return (Rolf Benirschke kick), 11:19. Chargers 7–0.

**Second quarter**

- No scoring plays.

**Third quarter**

- No scoring plays.

**Fourth quarter**

- SDG – Rickey Young 5-yard run (Rolf Benirschke kick), 1:16. Chargers 14–0. **Drive: 8 plays, 60 yards, 4:28.**

**Top passers**

- SDG – James Harris – 11/21, 137 yards
- NO – Archie Manning – 16/26, 124 yards, INT

**Top rushers**

- SDG – Rickey Young – 11 rushes, 40 yards, TD
- NO – Chuck Muncie – 18 rushes, 78 yards

**Top receivers**

- SDG – Larry Dorsey – 3 receptions, 43 yards
- NO – Tony Galbreath – 9 receptions, 55 yards

===== Week 10 vs. Atlanta Falcons =====
- TV Network: CBS
- Announcers: Gary Bender, Johnny Unitas

Atlanta, which had never given up more than 14 points in a game this year, tried to keep it that way with one minute to go, in front of a Regional TV Audience - in New Orleans - And Archie Manning was waiting. The Saints quarterback, back in action for the first time in six weeks, throw a 18-yard TD Pass, his second scoring strike to Henry Childs. It was Hank Stram's 136th victory as a head coach.

=== Standings ===
NFC West
	W	L	T	PCT	DIV	CONF	PF	PA	STK
Los Angeles Rams^{(2)}	10	4	0	.714	4–2	8–4	302	146	L1
Atlanta Falcons	7	7	0	.500	3–3	7–5	179	129	W1
San Francisco 49ers	5	9	0	.357	3–3	5–7	220	260	L3
New Orleans Saints	3	11	0	.214	2–4	3–9	232	336	L4
