= 1977 San Francisco 49ers season =

American football team season

- Owner: Edward J. DeBartolo, Jr.
- General manager: Joe Thomas
- Head coach: Ken Meyer
- Home stadium: Candlestick Park

Results
- Record: 5–9
- Division place: 3rd NFC West
- Playoffs: Did not qualify
- Pro Bowlers: DT Cleveland Elam

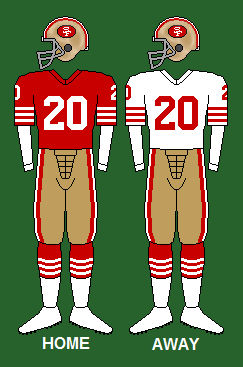
1977 uniform of the San Francisco 49ers

The 1977 San Francisco 49ers season was the franchise's 28th season in the National Football League, their 32nd overall, and their first season with general manager Joe Thomas and head coach Ken Meyer. Hoping to build on their 8–6 season from the previous year, the team struggled and was again unable to qualify for the playoffs, this time posting a record of 5–9, including starting the season 0–5.

== Offseason ==
Before the season began, the team was purchased by Edward DeBartolo, Sr., who in turn gave management of the team to his son, Edward DeBartolo, Jr. The team also hired a new general manager, Joe Thomas, and a new head coach, Ken Meyer.

=== NFL draft ===
1977 San Francisco 49ers draft
Round	Pick	Player	Position	College	Notes
3	65	Elmo Boyd	Wide receiver	Eastern Kentucky	
4	100	Stan Black	Defensive back	Mississippi State	
6	141	Mike Burns	Defensive back	USC	
6	155	Jim Harlan	Tackle	Howard Payne	
7	183	Jim Van Wagner	Running back	Michigan Tech	
9	239	David Posey	Kicker	Florida	
11	295	Brian Billick	Tight end	BYU	
12	323	Scott Martin	Guard	North Dakota	
Made roster

== Personnel ==
=== Staff / Coaches ===
1977 San Francisco 49ers staff
Front office: Owner and President – Edward J. DeBartolo, Jr.; General manager – Joe Thomas; Head coaches: Head coach – Ken Meyer; Offensive coaches: Offensive Backfield – Doug Gerhart; Receivers – Jimmy Raye; Offensive Line – Howard Mudd	Defensive coaches: Defensive Line – Floyd Peters; Linebackers – Ed Beard; Defensive Backfield – Jim Shofner; Special teams coaches: Special Teams – Ed Alsman

=== Roster ===
1977 San Francisco 49ers roster
Quarterbacks (QB): 19 Scott Bull; 17 Steve DeBerg; 16 Jim Plunkett; Running backs (RB): 38 Bob Ferrell; 36 Paul Hofer; 40 Wilbur Jackson; 30 Dave Williams; 24 Delvin Williams; Wide receivers (WR): 83 Kenny Harrison; 87 Jim Lash; 81 Willie McGee; 18 Gene Washington; Tight ends (TE): 84 Tom Mitchell; 89 Jim Obradovich; 85 Paul Seal	Offensive linemen (OL): 68 John Ayers G/T; 77 Jean Barrett T; 51 Randy Cross C; 71 Keith Fahnhorst T; 65 Steve Lawson G; 66 Johnny Miller G; 69 Woody Peoples G; 67 Ron Singleton T; Defensive linemen (DL): 82 Tony Cline DE; 76 Bill Cooke DT; 72 Cleveland Elam DT; 75 Ed Galigher DT; 86 Cedrick Hardman DE; 53 Tommy Hart DE; 74 Jimmy Webb DT	Linebackers (LB): 41 Mike Baldassin OLB; 54 Ed Bradley MLB; 55 Bruce Elia MLB; 59 Willie Harper OLB; 58 Howard Stidham OLB; 52 Skip Vanderbundt OLB; Defensive backs (DB): 26 Stan Black FS; 28 Mike Burns CB; 42 Tony Leonard CB; 22 Eddie Lewis CB; 47 Al Matthews SS; 32 Mel Phillips SS; 44 Bruce Taylor CB; Special teams (ST): 14 Ray Wersching K; 13 Tom Wittum P	Reserve: 79 Cas Banaszek T (IR); -- Elmo Boyd WR (IR); 49 Ralph McGill S (IR); 64 Dale Mitchell LB (IR); 23 Bruce Rhodes S (IR); 50 Dave Washington LB (IR); Rookies in italics

== Preseason ==
Week	Date	Opponent	Result	Record	Venue	Attendance
1	August 7	Seattle Seahawks	L 24–34	0–1	Candlestick Park	38,024
2	August 13	at San Diego Chargers	L 13–32	0–2	San Diego Stadium	26,620
3	August 21	Los Angeles Rams	W 23–14	1–2	Candlestick Park	44,898
4	August 29	at Houston Oilers	L 3–17	1–3	Astrodome	36,538
5	September 3	at Oakland Raiders	L 0–33	1–4	Oakland–Alameda County Coliseum	53,442
6	September 10	Denver Broncos	L 0–20	1–5	Candlestick Park	36,441

== Schedule ==
Week	Date	Opponent	Result	Record	Venue	Attendance
1	September 19	at Pittsburgh Steelers	**L** 0–27	0–1	Three Rivers Stadium	48,046
2	September 25	Miami Dolphins	**L** 15–19	0–2	Candlestick Park	40,503
3	October 2	at **Los Angeles Rams**	**L** 14–34	0–3	Los Angeles Memorial Coliseum	55,466
4	October 9	**Atlanta Falcons**	**L** 0–7	0–4	Candlestick Park	38,009
5	October 16	at New York Giants	**L** 17–20	0–5	Giants Stadium	70,366
6	October 23	Detroit Lions	**W** 28–7	1–5	Candlestick Park	39,392
7	October 30	Tampa Bay Buccaneers	**W** 20–10	2–5	Candlestick Park	34,700
8	November 6	at **Atlanta Falcons**	**W** 10–3	3–5	Atlanta–Fulton County Stadium	46,577
9	November 13	at **New Orleans Saints**	**W** 10–7	4–5	Louisiana Superdome	41,564
10	November 20	**Los Angeles Rams**	**L** 10–23	4–6	Candlestick Park	56,779
11	November 27	**New Orleans Saints**	**W** 20–17	5–6	Candlestick Park	33,702
12	December 4	at Minnesota Vikings	**L** 27–28	5–7	Metropolitan Stadium	40,745
13	December 12	Dallas Cowboys	**L** 35–42	5–8	Candlestick Park	55,851
14	December 18	at Green Bay Packers	**L** 14–16	5–9	Milwaukee County Stadium	44,902
Note: Intra-division opponents are in **bold** text.

=== Game summaries ===
==== Week 8: at Atlanta Falcons ====
- Television: CBS
- Announcers: Gary Bender, Tom Matte
- Stadium: Atlanta Fulton County Stadium in Atlanta, Georgia
- Attendance: 46,577

San Francisco knocked Atlanta out of a tie for first in the NFC West, sacking Falcons quarterback Steve Bartkowski seven times for a loss of 76 yards. The only touchdown of a game came on a 2-yard run by Wilbur Jackson.

==== Week 9: at New Orleans Saints ====
- Television: CBS
- Announcers: Frank Glieber and Nick Buoniconti

Ray Wersching booted a 33-yard field goal in overtime to cap a second half San Francisco rally and give his team a comeback win over New Orleans. Wersching had a chance to end the game in regulation time when his 50-yard field goal was miss midway through the fourth quarter. The drive to a winning score covered 59 yards. Delvin Williams, who put the 49ers on the scoreboard with a 5-yard touchdown run in the third quarter, got 16 yards on the drive and finished the game with 110 yards on 25 carries. The Saints also missed a chance to win it in regulation when Rich Szaro's 30-yard field goal attempt hit the left goal post and bounced away.

==== Week 11: vs. New Orleans Saints ====
- Television: CBS
- Announcers: Tim Ryan, Tom Matte

This game started when the Saints Rich Szaro kicked a 30-yard field goal. then the 49ers rallied back to even the game with a Ray Wersching field goal of 40 yards but back came those Saints as Clarence Chapman returned a kickoff 92 yards for a touchdown. In a game that has no playoff berths at stake but pride, the Saints added to their lead as Archie Manning scored from 1 yard out. But the 49ers came back on the legs of Wilbur Jackson who ran for 190 yards on 16 carries before he left the game in the fourth quarter with a pulled hamstring. Jackson scored on touchdowns from 34 and 1. Then late in the game the 49ers drove on the legs of Delvin Williams. the 49ers chances to win was helped by a roughing the passing penalty against Mike Fultz of the Saints cancelling a Potential Saints interception. Giving new life Ray Wersching kicked a 42-yard field goal with no time left to give the 49ers a win.

=== Standings ===
NFC West
	W	L	T	PCT	DIV	CONF	PF	PA	STK
Los Angeles Rams^{(2)}	10	4	0	.714	4–2	8–4	302	146	L1
Atlanta Falcons	7	7	0	.500	3–3	7–5	179	129	W1
San Francisco 49ers	5	9	0	.357	3–3	5–7	220	260	L3
New Orleans Saints	3	11	0	.214	2–4	3–9	232	336	L4
