= Melshire Estates, Dallas =

Coordinates: 32.914°N 96.810°W

Melshire Estates
- Interactive map of Melshire Estates
- Country: United States
- State: Texas
- Counties: Dallas
- City: Dallas
- Area: north Dallas
- Elevation: 614 ft (187 m)
- ZIP code: 75230
- Area codes: 214, 469, 972
- Website: http://melshireestates.com

Melshire Estates is a neighborhood in north Dallas, Texas (USA). It is generally bounded by Charlestown Drive (and the houses to the north facing it) on the north, Preston Road ( SH 289) on the east, Forest Lane on the south, and the Dallas North Tollway on the west. Small areas adjacent to Forest Lane, a shopping center on the northwestern corner of Preston Road and Forest Lane, and townhomes along Lindenshire Lane and Brookstone Drive are not considered part of the neighborhood.

== Education ==
The neighborhood is served by the Dallas Independent School District. Children in the neighborhood attend Nathan Adams Elementary School, E. D. Walker Middle School, and W. T. White High School.
