= 1979 NFL season =

American football season

Regular season
- Duration: September 1 – December 17, 1979

Playoffs
- Start date: December 23, 1979
- AFC Champions: Pittsburgh Steelers
- NFC Champions: Los Angeles Rams

Super Bowl XIV
- Date: January 20, 1980
- Site: Rose Bowl, Pasadena, California
- Champions: Pittsburgh Steelers

Pro Bowl
- Date: January 27, 1980
- Site: Aloha Stadium

AFC teams: West, Central, East
NFC teams: West, Central, East

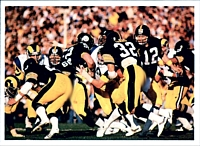
The Steelers playing the Rams in Super Bowl XIV.

The 1979 NFL season was the 60th regular season of the National Football League. The season ended with Super Bowl XIV when the Pittsburgh Steelers repeated as champions by defeating the Los Angeles Rams 31–19 at the Rose Bowl. The Steelers became the first and only team to win back-to-back Super Bowls twice.

== Draft ==
The 1979 NFL draft was held from May 3 to 4, 1979, at New York City's Waldorf Astoria New York. With the first pick, the Buffalo Bills selected linebacker Tom Cousineau from the Ohio State University.

== New officials ==
Jerry Seeman was promoted to referee succeeding Don Wedge who returned to being a deep wing official, primarily as a back judge (now field judge), where he continued to officiate through 1995. Seeman served as a crew chief for 12 seasons, working Super Bowl XXIII and Super Bowl XXV before leaving the field to succeed Art McNally as NFL Vice President of Officiating from 1991 to 2001.

== Major rule changes ==
- Whenever the quarterback is sacked, the clock will be stopped for at least five seconds and then restarted again. (The stoppage was eliminated effective the 2014 NFL season.)
- Officials are now instructed to blow the play dead once a quarterback is clearly "in the grasp and control" of any tackler.
- If a fair catch is made, or signaled and awarded to a team because of interference, on the last play of a half or overtime, the period can be extended and the team can run one play from scrimmage or attempt a fair catch kick.
- The league's jersey numbering system was modified to allow defensive linemen wear numbers 90 to 99, in addition to 60 to 79. And centers were allowed to wear 60–79, in addition to 50 to 59.
- Players are prohibited from wearing torn or altered equipment. Tear-away jerseys are banned.
- During kickoffs, punts, and field goal attempts, players on the receiving team cannot block below the waist.
- The zone in which crackback blocks are prohibited is extended from 3 yards on either side of the line of scrimmage to 5.
- Players cannot use their helmets to butt, spear, or ram an opponent. Any player who uses the crown or the top of his helmet unnecessarily will be called for unnecessary roughness.
- In order to prevent incidents such as the Holy Roller game, the following change is made: If an offensive player fumbles during a fourth down play, or during any down played after the two-minute warning in a half or overtime, only the fumbling player can recover and/or advance the ball. This change is known as the "Ken Stabler rule" after the Oakland Raiders quarterback who made the infamous play in the Holy Roller game. In officiating circles, it's known as the "Markbreit rule" after Jerry Markbreit, who was the referee for that game.
- Uprights were extended to 30 feet above the crossbar.

== Division races ==
Starting in 1978, ten teams qualified for the playoffs: the winners of each of the divisions, and two wild-card teams in each conference.

=== National Football Conference ===
Week	NFC East		NFC Central		NFC West		Wild Card		Wild Card	
1	Dallas, Philadelphia	1–0	3 teams	1–0	Atlanta	1–0				
2	Dallas	2–0	Tampa Bay, Chicago	2–0	Atlanta	2–0				
3	Dallas	3–0	Tampa Bay	3–0	Atlanta, Los Angeles	2–1				
4	Dallas, Philadelphia, Washington	3–1	Tampa Bay	4–0	Atlanta, Los Angeles	2–2	Chicago	2–2	Minnesota	2–2
5	Dallas, Philadelphia, Washington	4–1	Tampa Bay	5–0	Los Angeles	3–2	Minnesota	3–2	4 teams	2–3
6	Dallas, Philadelphia	5–1	Tampa Bay	5–1	Los Angeles	4–2	Washington	4–2	3 teams	3–3
7	Dallas, Philadelphia	6–1	Tampa Bay	5–2	Los Angeles	4–3	Washington	5–2	5 teams	3–4
8	Dallas	7–1	Tampa Bay	6–2	Los Angeles, New Orleans	4–4	Philadelphia, Washington	6–2	Minnesota	4–4
9	Dallas	7–2	Tampa Bay	7–2	New Orleans	5–4	Philadelphia, Washington	6–3	4 teams	4–5
10	Dallas	8–2	Tampa Bay	7–3	Los Angeles, New Orleans	5–5	Philadelphia, Washington	6–4	Chicago	5–5
11	Dallas	8–3	Tampa Bay	8–3	New Orleans	6-5	Philadelphia, Washington	7–4	Chicago	6–5
12	Dallas, Philadelphia, Washington	8–4	Tampa Bay	9–3	Los Angeles, New Orleans	6–6	Chicago	7–5	Giants, Minnesota	5–7
13	Philadelphia	9–4	Tampa Bay	9–4	Los Angeles, New Orleans	7–6	Dallas, Washington	8–5	Chicago	7–6
14	Philadelphia	10–4	Tampa Bay	9–5	Los Angeles	8–6	Dallas, Washington	9–5	Chicago	8–6
15	Dallas, Philadelphia, Washington	10–5	Tampa Bay, Chicago	9–6	Los Angeles	9–6	Minnesota, New Orleans	7–8	Giants	6–9
16	Dallas	11–5	Tampa Bay	10–6	Los Angeles	9–7	Philadelphia	11–5	Chicago	10–6

=== American Football Conference ===
Week	AFC East		AFC Central		AFC West		Wild Card		Wild Card	
1	Miami	1–0	3 teams	1–0	4 teams	1–0				
2	Miami	2–0	Pittsburgh, Cleveland	2–0	San Diego	2–0				
3	Miami	3–0	Pittsburgh, Cleveland	3–0	San Diego	3–0	3 teams	2–1		
4	Miami	4–0	Pittsburgh, Cleveland	4–0	San Diego, Denver	3–1	New England, Houston	3–1	Buffalo, Kansas City	2–2
5	Miami	4–1	Pittsburgh, Cleveland, Houston	4–1	San Diego	4–1	4 teams	3–2	Jets, Oakland	2–3
6	Miami, New England	4–2	Pittsburgh	5–1	San Diego, Denver, Kansas City	4–2	Cleveland, Houston	4–2	Buffalo, Oakland	3–3
7	Miami, New England	5–2	Pittsburgh, Houston	5–2	San Diego, Denver	5–2	3 teams	4–3	Buffalo, Jets	3–4
8	New England	6–2	Pittsburgh	6–2	San Diego	6–2	4 teams	5–3	3 teams	4–4
9	Miami, New England	6–3	Pittsburgh	7–2	San Diego, Denver	6–3	Cleveland, Houston	6–3	Oakland	5–4
10	New England	7–3	Pittsburgh	8–2	Denver	7–3	Houston	7–3	Cleveland, San Diego	7-3
11	New England	7–4	Pittsburgh	9–2	Denver	8–3	Houston	8–3	San Diego	8-3
12	New England	8–4	Pittsburgh	9–3	Denver	9–3	Houston	9-3	San Diego	9-3
13	New England	8–5	Pittsburgh	10–3	San Diego	10–3	Houston	10-3	Denver	9-4
14	Miami	9–5	Pittsburgh	11–3	Denver	10–4	Houston, San Diego	10–4	Houston, San Diego	10-4
15	Miami	10–5	Houston	11–4	San Diego	11–4	Pittsburgh	11–4	Denver	10-5
16	Miami	10–6	Pittsburgh	12–4	San Diego	12–4	Houston	11–5	Denver	10–6

== Final standings ==
AFC East
	W	L	T	PCT	DIV	CONF	PF	PA	STK
^{(3)} Miami Dolphins	10	6	0	.625	5–3	6–6	341	257	L1
New England Patriots	9	7	0	.563	4–4	6–6	411	326	W1
New York Jets	8	8	0	.500	4–4	5–7	337	383	W3
Buffalo Bills	7	9	0	.438	4–4	5–7	268	279	L3
Baltimore Colts	5	11	0	.313	3–5	4–10	271	351	W1

AFC Central
	W	L	T	PCT	DIV	CONF	PF	PA	STK
^{(2)} Pittsburgh Steelers	12	4	0	.750	4–2	9–3	416	262	W1
^{(4)} Houston Oilers	11	5	0	.688	4–2	9–3	362	331	L1
Cleveland Browns	9	7	0	.563	2–4	6–6	359	352	L2
Cincinnati Bengals	4	12	0	.250	2–4	2–10	337	421	W1

AFC West
	W	L	T	PCT	DIV	CONF	PF	PA	STK
^{(1)} San Diego Chargers	12	4	0	.750	6–2	9–3	411	246	W2
^{(5)} Denver Broncos	10	6	0	.625	4–4	7–5	289	262	L2
Seattle Seahawks	9	7	0	.563	3–5	6–6	378	372	W2
Oakland Raiders	9	7	0	.563	3–5	5–7	365	337	L1
Kansas City Chiefs	7	9	0	.438	4–4	7–7	238	262	L1

NFC East
	W	L	T	PCT	DIV	CONF	PF	PA	STK
^{(1)} Dallas Cowboys	11	5	0	.688	6–2	10–2	371	313	W3
^{(4)} Philadelphia Eagles	11	5	0	.688	6–2	9–3	339	282	W1
Washington Redskins	10	6	0	.625	5–3	8–4	348	295	L1
New York Giants	6	10	0	.375	1–7	5–9	237	323	L3
St. Louis Cardinals	5	11	0	.313	2–6	4–8	307	358	L1

NFC Central
	W	L	T	PCT	DIV	CONF	PF	PA	STK
^{(2)} Tampa Bay Buccaneers	10	6	0	.625	6–2	8–6	273	237	W1
^{(5)} Chicago Bears	10	6	0	.625	5–3	8–4	306	249	W3
Minnesota Vikings	7	9	0	.438	5–3	6–6	259	337	L1
Green Bay Packers	5	11	0	.313	3–5	4–8	246	316	W1
Detroit Lions	2	14	0	.125	1–7	2–10	219	365	L3

NFC West
	W	L	T	PCT	DIV	CONF	PF	PA	STK
^{(3)} Los Angeles Rams	9	7	0	.563	5–1	7–5	323	309	L1
New Orleans Saints	8	8	0	.500	4–2	8–4	370	360	W1
Atlanta Falcons	6	10	0	.375	2–4	5–7	300	388	W1
San Francisco 49ers	2	14	0	.125	1–5	2–10	308	416	L1

=== Tiebreakers ===
- San Diego was the top AFC playoff seed based on head-to-head victory over Pittsburgh (1-0).
- Seattle finished ahead of Oakland in the AFC West based on head-to-head sweep (2–0).
- Dallas finished ahead of Philadelphia in the NFC East based on better conference record (10–2 to Philadelphia's 9–3).
- Tampa Bay finished ahead of Chicago in the NFC Central based on better division record (6–2 to Chicago's 5–3).
- Chicago was the second NFC Wild Card ahead of Washington based on better net points in all games (+57 to Washington's +53).

== Playoffs ==
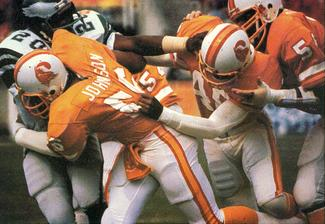
The Buccaneers playing against the Eagles in 1979 NFC Divisional Playoff Game.

Dec 30 – Texas Stadium
3	Los Angeles	21
Dec 23 – Veterans Stadium	Jan 6 – Tampa Stadium
1*	Dallas	19
NFC
5	Chicago	17	3	Los Angeles	9
Dec 29 – Tampa Stadium
4	Philadelphia	27	2	Tampa Bay	0
NFC Championship
4	Philadelphia	17
Jan 20 – Rose Bowl
2*	Tampa Bay	24
Divisional round
Wild-card round	N3	Los Angeles	19
Dec 29 – San Diego Stadium
A2	Pittsburgh	31
Super Bowl XIV
4	Houston	17
Dec 23 – Astrodome	Jan 6 – Three Rivers Stadium
1	San Diego	14
AFC
5	Denver	7	4	Houston	13
Dec 30 – Three Rivers Stadium
4	Houston	13	2	Pittsburgh	27
AFC Championship
3	Miami	14
2	Pittsburgh	34

Note: The Dallas Cowboys (the NFC 1 seed) did not play the Philadelphia Eagles (the 4 seed) in the Divisional playoff round because both teams were in the same division.

== Statistical leaders ==
=== Team ===
Points scored	Pittsburgh Steelers (416)
Total yards gained	Pittsburgh Steelers (6,258)
Yards rushing	New York Jets (2,646)
Yards passing	San Diego Chargers (3,915)
Fewest points allowed	Tampa Bay Buccaneers (237)
Fewest total yards allowed	Tampa Bay Buccaneers (3,949)
Fewest rushing yards allowed	Denver Broncos (1,693)
Fewest passing yards allowed	Tampa Bay Buccaneers (2,076)

== Awards ==
Most Valuable Player	Earl Campbell, running back, Houston Oilers
Coach of the Year	Jack Pardee, Washington
Offensive Player of the Year	Earl Campbell, running back, Houston Oilers
Defensive Player of the Year	Lee Roy Selmon, defensive end, Tampa Bay
Offensive Rookie of the Year	Ottis Anderson, running back, St. Louis Cardinals
Defensive Rookie of the Year	Jim Haslett, linebacker, Buffalo
Man of the Year Award	Joe Greene, defensive tackle, Pittsburgh
Comeback Player of the Year	Larry Csonka, running back, Miami
Super Bowl Most Valuable Player	Terry Bradshaw, quarterback, Pittsburgh

== Coaching changes ==
=== Offseason ===
- Cincinnati Bengals: Homer Rice began his first full season as the team's head coach. He replaced Bill Johnson after the Bengals started the 1978 season at 0–5.
- Oakland Raiders: John Madden retired and was replaced by Tom Flores.
- New England Patriots: Ron Erhardt was named as permanent head coach. The team had suspended Chuck Fairbanks for the last regular season game in 1978. Fairbanks had been in talks all that season to join the University of Colorado Buffaloes, breaching his contract with the Patriots. Coordinators Erhardt and Hank Bullough took over as co-interim head coaches for that final 1978 game. Fairbanks was reinstated as head coach two weeks later for the Divisional Playoffs, but left in the off-season to join Colorado.
- New York Giants: John McVay was fired and replaced by Ray Perkins.
- San Diego Chargers: Don Coryell began his first full season as Chargers head coach. He replaced Tommy Prothro, who was fired after a 1–3 start in 1978.
- San Francisco 49ers: Bill Walsh was hired as the new 49ers head coach. Pete McCulley was fired after a 1–8 start in 1978, and Fred O'Connor served as interim for the last seven games.

=== In-season ===
- St. Louis Cardinals: Bud Wilkinson was fired after the team started the season at 3–10 for refusing to bench longtime starting quarterback Jim Hart in favor of Steve Pisarciewicz. Personnel director Larry Wilson, a Hall of Fame safety for the team from 1960 to 1972 and later the franchise's general manager, served as interim for the last three games.

== Uniform changes ==
- Several changes were made to the officiating uniforms, including:
  - Referees were outfitted with black identifying hats, while all other officials continued to wear white hats. This was the same as the Canadian Football League at the time, but the opposite of American high school and college football.
  - For the first time, each official's position was identified on his shirt. The position was abbreviated on the front pocket of the shirt and then spelled out on the back above the number.
  - The numbering system for officials was altered, with officials numbered separately by position (3 through 20) rather than as an entire group, making duplicate numbers among officials common.
- The TV numbers on the Dallas Cowboys' blue jerseys moved from the sleeves, matching the white jerseys, which moved the TV numbers to the shoulders in 1974. TV numbers were located on the shoulders of both Cowboys jerseys from 1964-69.
- The New England Patriots added red pants to be worn with their white jerseys, the first time they wore pants other than white.
- The New York Giants began wearing their white pants with their white jerseys, discontinuing their blue pants
- The Washington Redskins replaced their gold pants with burgundy pants with their white jerseys and white pants with their burgundy jerseys, in addition the sleeve and pant striping being altered. The shade of burgundy was also darkened.
- The San Diego Chargers replaced the blue and white stripe on the yellow pants with a white lightning bolt outlined in blue.

== Television ==
This was the second year under the league's four-year broadcast contracts with ABC, CBS, and NBC to televise Monday Night Football, the NFC package, and the AFC package, respectively.

Fran Tarkenton began serving as a fill-in color commentator for ABC, while Bryant Gumbel became the sole host of NBC's pregame show NFL '79.

Dick Enberg and Merlin Olsen replaced Curt Gowdy and John Brodie as NBC's lead commentary team. Rather than demote Gowdy, NBC traded him away to CBS for Don Criqui. With Pat Summerall and Tom Brookshier remaining as CBS' lead commentary team, and Vin Scully and George Allen as the #2 team, Gowdy was paired with Hank Stram as the network's #3 team. Criqui and Brodie formed NBC's new #2 team.

John Madden, who retired as Oakland Raiders coach following the previous season, was hired by CBS. He remained with CBS through 1993, when it lost the NFC package to FOX. Additionally, longtime NBC play-by-play broadcaster Jim Simpson left NBC after Week 2 of the 1979 season to join the newly-launched ESPN.
