= Dave Farmer =

American football player (born 1954)

No. 41
- Position: Running back

Personal information
- Born: March 20, 1954 (age 72); Phoenix, Arizona, U.S.
- Listed height: 6 ft 0 in (1.83 m)
- Listed weight: 205 lb (93 kg)

Career information
- High school: Workman (City of Industry, California)
- College: USC (1973–1976)
- NFL draft: 1977: 11th round, 287th overall pick

Career history
- Atlanta Falcons (1977); Tampa Bay Buccaneers (1978)

Awards and highlights
- National champion (1974)
- Stats at Pro Football Reference

David W. Farmer (born May 20, 1954) is an American former professional football player who was a running back for one season with the Tampa Bay Buccaneers of the National Football League (NFL). He played college football for the USC Trojans and was selected by the Atlanta Falcons in the 11th round of the 1977 NFL draft.

== Early life ==
David W. Farmer was born on May 20, 1954, in Phoenix, Arizona. He attended Workman High School in the City of Industry, California.

== College career ==
Farmer was a member of the USC Trojans of the University of Southern California from 1973 to 1976. He was on the Trojans' junior varsity team in 1973, and was a three-year letterman from 1974 to 1976. He rushed 27 times for 204 yards and caught two passes for 37 yards in 1974 as the Trojans were named Coaches Poll national champions. Farmer recorded ten carries for 56 yards during the 1975 season. In 1976, he totaled 34 rushing attempts for 307 yards and one reception for eight yards.

== Professional career ==
Farmer was selected by the Atlanta Falcons in the 11th round, with the 287th overall pick, of the 1977 NFL draft. He officially signed with the team on June 13. He was placed on injured reserve on August 9 with a knee injury and spent the entire 1977 season there. He was released by the Falcons on August 22, 1978.

Farmer signed with the Tampa Bay Buccaneers on November 30, 1978. He played in three games for the team during the 1978 season, recording three special teams tackles. He was released on August 21, 1979.

== Personal life ==
Farmer's brother George and nephew Danny also played in the NFL.
