= Bruce Rhodes =

American football player (1952–1981)

No. 23
- Position: Defensive back

Personal information
- Born: April 17, 1952; San Francisco, California
- Died: February 23, 1981 (aged 28); San Francisco, California
- Listed height: 6 ft 0 in (1.83 m)
- Listed weight: 187 lb (85 kg)

Career information
- High school: San Francisco (CA) Woodrow Wilson
- College: San Francisco State

Career history
- San Francisco 49ers (1976); Detroit Lions (1978)
- Stats at Pro Football Reference

Bruce Rhodes (April 17, 1952 – February 23, 1981) was an American football defensive back. He played for the San Francisco 49ers in 1976 and for the Detroit Lions in 1978.

Rhodes was shot and killed on February 23, 1981, in San Francisco, California at age 28. His wife was badly wounded after being shot three times. On September 16, 1981, 22-year-old ex-convict Bobby Joe Birden was found guilty of first degree murder, attempted murder, and robbery for the shootings. On October 14, 1981, Birden was sentenced to 34 years to life in prison.
