= Mike Connell (American football) =

American football player (born 1956)

No. 10
- Position: Punter

Personal information
- Born: March 15, 1956 (age 70); Sharon, Pennsylvania, U.S.
- Listed height: 6 ft 1 in (1.85 m)
- Listed weight: 200 lb (91 kg)

Career information
- College: Cincinnati
- NFL draft: 1978: 10th round, 260th overall pick

Career history
- San Francisco 49ers (1978); Washington Redskins (1980–1981)

Career NFL statistics
- Punts: 254
- Punt yards: 9,837
- Longest punt: 59
- Stats at Pro Football Reference

Michael C. Connell (born March 15, 1956) is an American former professional football player who was a punter in the National Football League (NFL) for the Washington Redskins and San Francisco 49ers. He played college football for the Cincinnati Bearcats and was selected in the tenth round of the 1978 NFL draft.
