= Willie McCray =

American football player (1953–2022)

No. 76
- Position: Defensive end

Personal information
- Born: July 17, 1953; Fort Lee, Virginia, U.S.
- Died: January 3, 2022 (aged 68); Washington D.C., U.S.
- Listed height: 6 ft 5 in (1.96 m)
- Listed weight: 234 lb (106 kg)

Career information
- High school: Hopewell (VA), Laurinburg Institute (NC)
- College: Alabama, Troy
- NFL draft: 1978: 11th round, 287th overall pick

Career history
- San Francisco 49ers (1978)

Career NFL statistics
- Fumble recoveries: 1
- Stats at Pro Football Reference

Willie Lee McCray Jr. (July 17, 1953 – January 3, 2022) was an American professional football defensive end. He played for the San Francisco 49ers in 1978.
