= Cory Aldridge =

American baseball player (born 1979)

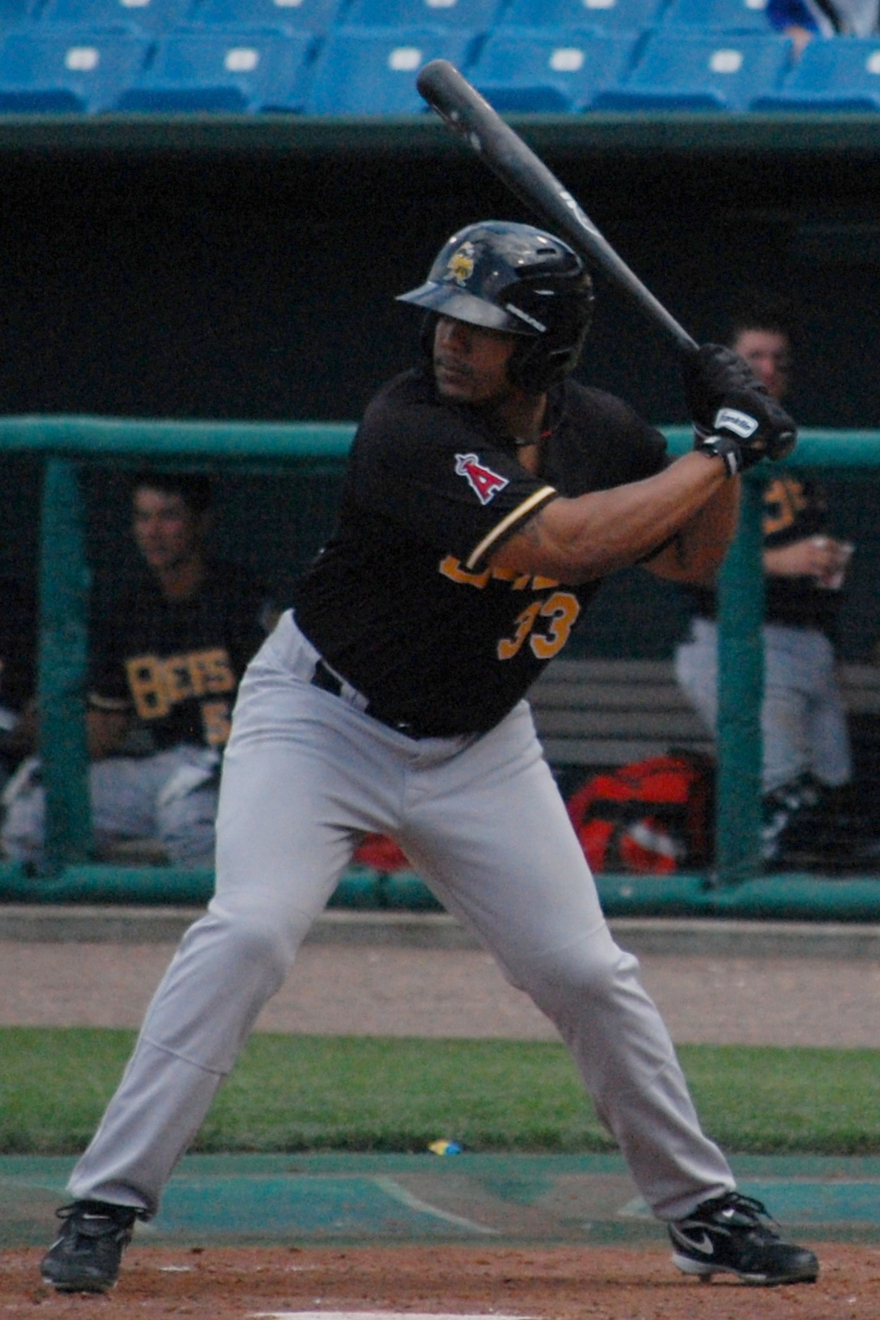
- Aldridge with the Salt Lake Bees in 2010
- Outfielder
- Born: June 13, 1979 (age 46); San Angelo, Texas, U.S.
- Batted: Left Threw: Right

Professional debut
- MLB: September 5, 2001, for the Atlanta Braves
- KBO: 2011, for the Nexen Heroes

Last appearance
- MLB: July 11, 2010, for the Los Angeles Angels of Anaheim
- KBO: 2011, for the Nexen Heroes

MLB statistics
- Batting average: .056
- Home runs: 0
- Runs batted in: 1

KBO statistics
- Batting average: .237
- Home runs: 20
- Runs batted in: 73
- Stats at Baseball Reference

Teams
- Atlanta Braves (2001); Los Angeles Angels of Anaheim (2010); Nexen Heroes (2011)

Cory Jerome Aldridge (born June 13, 1979) is an American former professional baseball outfielder. He was drafted by the Atlanta Braves in the fourth round of the 1997 Major League Baseball draft. He played in Major League Baseball (MLB) for the Braves and Los Angeles Angels of Anaheim, and in the KBO League for the Nexen Heroes.

== Career ==
Aldridge played in eight games for the Braves in the 2001 season. He had no hits in five at-bats, with four strikeouts. In 2008, he played in the Kansas City Royals organization for the Triple-A Omaha Royals.

In 2010, Aldridge was called up by the Los Angeles Angels of Anaheim to play in the outfield. He got his first major league hit against the Oakland Athletics, an RBI triple.

On January 28, 2012, Aldridge signed a minor league contract with the Baltimore Orioles. He did not remain with the team, instead beginning the 2012 season in the Mexican League, before being signed to a minor league contract by the Los Angeles Angels of Anaheim on May 22.

Aldridge was acquired by the Toronto Blue Jays on June 24, 2014. He was promoted from the Double-A New Hampshire Fisher Cats to the Triple-A Buffalo Bisons on July 4.

== Personal ==
His father Jerry Aldridge played American football as a halfback for the San Francisco 49ers.
