= 1979 San Francisco 49ers season =

American football team season

- Owner: Edward J. DeBartolo, Jr.
- General manager: Bill Walsh
- Head coach: Bill Walsh
- Defensive coordinator: Chuck Studley
- Home stadium: Candlestick Park

Results
- Record: 2–14
- Division place: 4th NFC West
- Playoffs: Did not qualify
- Pro Bowlers: none

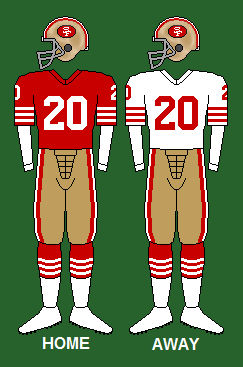
The uniform of the San Francisco 49ers, 1976-1983

The 1979 San Francisco 49ers season was the franchise's 30th season in the National Football League and their 34th overall. The season is noted as running back O. J. Simpson's final year, quarterback Joe Montana's rookie season, and Bill Walsh's first year as head coach.

The 1979 49ers remain the only team in NFL history to lose twelve games in which they held a lead.

They are also the first team in NFL history to attempt 600 or more passes, attempting 602.

== Offseason ==
=== NFL draft ===
1979 San Francisco 49ers draft
| Round | Pick | Player | Position | College | Notes |
| 2 | 29 | James Owens | Running back | UCLA | |
| 3 | 82 | Joe Montana * ^{†} | Quarterback | Notre Dame | |
| 5 | 111 | Tom Seabron | Linebacker | Michigan | |
| 5 | 119 | Jerry Aldridge | Running back | Angelo State | |
| 6 | 138 | Ruben Vaughan | Defensive tackle | Colorado | |
| 7 | 166 | Phil Francis | Running back | Stanford | |
| 9 | 221 | Steve Hamilton | Defensive tackle | Missouri | |
| 10 | 249 | Dwight Clark * | Wide receiver | Clemson | |
| 10 | 252 | Howard Ballage | Defensive back | Colorado | |
| 11 | 276 | Billy McBride | Defensive back | Tennessee State | |
Made roster † Pro Football Hall of Fame * Made at least one Pro Bowl during career

=== Undrafted free agents ===
1979 undrafted free agents of note
| Player | Position | College |
|---|---|---|
| Gordy Ceresino | Linebacker | Stanford |
| Dan Melville | Punter | California |

== Personnel ==
=== Staff / Coaches ===
1979 San Francisco 49ers staff
| Front office: Owner and president – Edward J. DeBartolo, Jr.; General manager – Bill Walsh; Director of player personnel – John McVay; Head coaches: Head coach – Bill Walsh; Offensive coaches: Quarterbacks – Sam Wyche; Running Backs – Billie Matthews; Receivers – Dennis Green; Offensive Line – Bobb McKittrick; Administrative Assistant/Offensive Line – Mike White | Defensive coaches: Defensive Coordinator – Chuck Studley; Linebackers – Bill McPherson; Defensive Backs – Norb Hecker; Special teams coaches: Special Teams – Dennis Green; Strength and conditioning: Strength and Conditioning – Al Vermeil |

=== Roster ===
1979 San Francisco 49ers roster
| Quarterbacks (QB): 17 Steve DeBerg; 16 Joe Montana; Running backs (RB): 35 Lenvil Elliott; 38 Bob Ferrell; 34 Phil Francis; 36 Paul Hofer; 40 Wilbur Jackson; 32 O. J. Simpson; Wide receivers (WR): 87 Dwight Clark; 20 James Owens; 84 Mike Shumann; 88 Freddie Solomon; Tight ends (TE): 82 Bob Bruer; 81 Ken MacAfee; 80 Eason Ramson; 85 Paul Seal | Offensive linemen (OL): 68 John Ayers G; 77 Jean Barrett T; 51 Randy Cross G; 62 Walt Downing G; 71 Keith Fahnhorst T; 56 Fred Quillan C; 67 Ron Singleton T; Defensive linemen (DL): 76 Dwaine Board DE; 79 Al Cowlings DE; 78 Archie Reese DE; 72 Ruben Vaughan DT; 66 Ted Vincent DT; 74 Jimmy Webb DT | Linebackers (LB): 57 Dan Bunz MLB; 58 Gordy Ceresino MLB; 59 Willie Harper OLB; 54 Bob Martin OLB; 52 Jeff McIntyre OLB; 50 Dave Morton OLB; 53 Tom Seabron OLB; Defensive backs (DB): 28 Charles Cornelius CB; 27 Tony Dungy FS; 30 Tim Gray SS; 22 Dwight Hicks FS; 44 Charles Johnson CB; 29 Gerard Williams CB; Special teams (ST): 11 Dan Melville P; 14 Ray Wersching K | Reserve: 47 Jerry Aldridge RB (IR); 41 Mike Baldassin LB (IR); -- Ed Bradley LB (IR); 86 Cedrick Hardman DE (IR); 55 Scott Hilton LB (IR); 45 Mike Hogan RB (IR); 65 Ernie Hughes G (IR); -- Dan Irons T (IR); 24 Eric Johnson S (IR); 26 Bob Jury S (IR); 60 Steve Knutson G/T (IR); -- Johnny Miller G (IR); 46 Melvin Morgan CB (IR); 66 Bob Nelson LB (IR); -- Troy Thomas DT; Rookies in italics |

== Preseason ==
| Week | Date | Opponent | Result | Record | Venue | Attendance |
|---|---|---|---|---|---|---|
| 1 | August 4 | San Diego Chargers | W 13–10 | 1–0 | Candlestick Park | 32,275 |
| 2 | August 11 | at Oakland Raiders | L 10–41 | 1–1 | Oakland–Alameda County Coliseum | 53,503 |
| 3 | August 19 | Denver Broncos | L 0–21 | 1–2 | Candlestick Park | 34,133 |
| 4 | August 24 | at Seattle Seahawks | L 20–55 | 1–3 | Kingdome | 59,941 |

== Regular season ==
=== Schedule ===
| Week | Date | Opponent | Result | Record | Venue | Attendance |
|---|---|---|---|---|---|---|
| 1 | September 2 | at Minnesota Vikings | **L** 22–28 | 0–1 | Metropolitan Stadium | 46,539 |
| 2 | September 9 | Dallas Cowboys | **L** 13–21 | 0–2 | Candlestick Park | 56,728 |
| 3 | September 16 | at **Los Angeles Rams** | **L** 24–27 | 0–3 | Los Angeles Memorial Coliseum | 44,303 |
| 4 | September 23 | **New Orleans Saints** | **L** 21–30 | 0–4 | Candlestick Park | 39,727 |
| 5 | September 30 | at San Diego Chargers | **L** 9–31 | 0–5 | San Diego Stadium | 50,893 |
| 6 | October 7 | Seattle Seahawks | **L** 24–35 | 0–6 | Candlestick Park | 44,592 |
| 7 | October 14 | at New York Giants | **L** 16–32 | 0–7 | Giants Stadium | 70,352 |
| 8 | October 21 | **Atlanta Falcons** | **W** 20–15 | 1–7 | Candlestick Park | 33,952 |
| 9 | October 28 | Chicago Bears | **L** 27–28 | 1–8 | Candlestick Park | 42,773 |
| 10 | November 4 | at Oakland Raiders | **L** 10–23 | 1–9 | Oakland–Alameda County Coliseum | 52,764 |
| 11 | November 11 | at **New Orleans Saints** | **L** 20–31 | 1–10 | Louisiana Superdome | 65,551 |
| 12 | November 18 | Denver Broncos | **L** 28–38 | 1–11 | Candlestick Park | 42,910 |
| 13 | November 25 | **Los Angeles Rams** | **L** 20–26 | 1–12 | Candlestick Park | 49,282 |
| 14 | December 2 | at St. Louis Cardinals | **L** 10–13 | 1–13 | Busch Memorial Stadium | 41,593 |
| 15 | December 9 | Tampa Bay Buccaneers | **W** 23–7 | 2–13 | Candlestick Park | 44,506 |
| 16 | December 16 | at **Atlanta Falcons** | **L** 21–31 | 2–14 | Atlanta–Fulton County Stadium | 37,211 |
Note: Intra-division opponents are in **bold** text.

=== Game summaries ===
==== Week 8: vs. Atlanta Falcons ====
| Team | 1 | 2 | 3 | 4 | Total |
|---|---|---|---|---|---|
| Falcons | 0 | 9 | 0 | 6 | 15 |
| • 49ers | 7 | 0 | 7 | 6 | 20 |

- Date: October 21
- Location: Candlestick Park
- Game start: 4:00 p.m. EST
- Game weather: 57 °F or 13.9 °C; wind 7 miles per hour (11 km/h; 6.1 kn)
- TV announcers (CBS): Lindsey Nelson and Paul Hornung

Scoring summary
| Q1 | SF | Solomon 56 yard run (Wersching kick) | SF 7–0 |
| Q2 | ATL | Mazzetti 23 yard field goal | SF 7–3 |
| Q2 | ATL | Jenkins 7 yard pass from Bartkowski (kick failed) | ATL 9–7 |
| Q3 | SF | Hofer 2 yard run (Wersching kick) | SF 14–9 |
| Q4 | ATL | Lawrence 41 yard blocked punt return (kick failed) | ATL 15–14 |
| Q4 | SF | Hofer 3 yard run (kick failed) | SF 20–15 |

==== Week 15: vs. Tampa Bay Buccaneers ====
Week Fifteen: Tampa Bay Buccaneers (9–5) at San Francisco 49ers (1–13)

| Quarter | 1 | 2 | 3 | 4 | Total |
|---|---|---|---|---|---|
| Buccaneers | 0 | 7 | 0 | 0 | **7** |
| **49ers** | 10 | 3 | 0 | 10 | **23** |

at Candlestick Park, San Francisco, California

- Date: December 9, 1979
- Game time: 4:00 p.m. EDT
- Game weather: 52 °F (11 °C)
- Game attendance: 44,506
- Box Score

Game information

**First quarter**

- SF – Mike Shumann 19-yard pass from Steve DeBerg (Ray Wersching kick). 49ers 7–0.
- SF – Ray Wersching 39-yard field goal. 49ers 10–0.

**Second quarter**

- TB – Jimmie Giles 19-yard pass from Doug Williams (Neil O'Donoghue kick). 49ers 10–7.
- SF – Ray Wersching 27-yard field goal. 49ers 13–7.

**Third quarter**

- No scoring

**Fourth quarter**

- SF – Lenvil Elliott 1-yard run (Ray Wersching kick). 49ers 20–7.
- SF – Ray Wersching 45-yard field goal. 49ers 27–7.

Top passers

- TB – Doug Williams – 10/24, 167 yards, TD, 5 INT
- SF – Steve DeBerg – 22/30, 186 yards, TD

Top rushers

- TB – Ricky Bell – 10 rushes, 36 yards
- SF – Wilbur Jackson – 10 rushes, 35 yards

Top receivers

- TB – Isaac Hagins – 3 receptions, 90 yards
- SF – Mike Shumann – 4 receptions, 61 yards, TD

"O.J. Simpson Day" at the stadium as it was his last home game. 49ers' players carried Bill Walsh off the field and fans tore down the goal posts.

=== Standings ===
NFC West
| | W | L | T | PCT | DIV | CONF | PF | PA | STK |
|---|---|---|---|---|---|---|---|---|---|
| ^{(3)} Los Angeles Rams | 9 | 7 | 0 | .563 | 5–1 | 7–5 | 323 | 309 | L1 |
| New Orleans Saints | 8 | 8 | 0 | .500 | 4–2 | 8–4 | 370 | 360 | W1 |
| Atlanta Falcons | 6 | 10 | 0 | .375 | 2–4 | 5–7 | 300 | 388 | W1 |
| San Francisco 49ers | 2 | 14 | 0 | .125 | 1–5 | 2–10 | 308 | 416 | L1 |
