= Elmo Boyd =

American football player (born 1954)

No. 85, 84
- Position: Wide receiver

Personal information
- Born: June 15, 1954 (age 72); Muleshoe, Texas, U.S.
- Listed height: 6 ft 0 in (1.83 m)
- Listed weight: 185 lb (84 kg)

Career information
- High school: Troy (OH)
- College: Eastern Kentucky
- NFL draft: 1977: 3rd round, 65th overall pick

Career history
- San Francisco 49ers (1977–1978); Green Bay Packers (1978)

Awards and highlights
- 2x All-Ohio Valley Conference First team (1975, 1976)

Career NFL statistics
- Receptions: 9
- Receiving yards: 115
- Receiving TDs: 1
- Stats at Pro Football Reference

Elmo David Boyd (born June 15, 1954) is an American former runner and football player who played as a wide receiver in the National Football League (NFL). He played at the college football at Eastern Kentucky University where he appeared in 42 games, having 119 receptions for 1,931 yards and scoring 12 touchdowns while being a first team All-Ohio Valley Conference in his junior and senior years. Boyd was selected in the third round of the 1977 NFL draft by the San Francisco 49ers but spent the season on the injured reserve list. He split the 1978 NFL season between the 49ers and the Green Bay Packers, appearing in 11 games.
