= Pete McCulley =

American football player and coach (1931–1992)

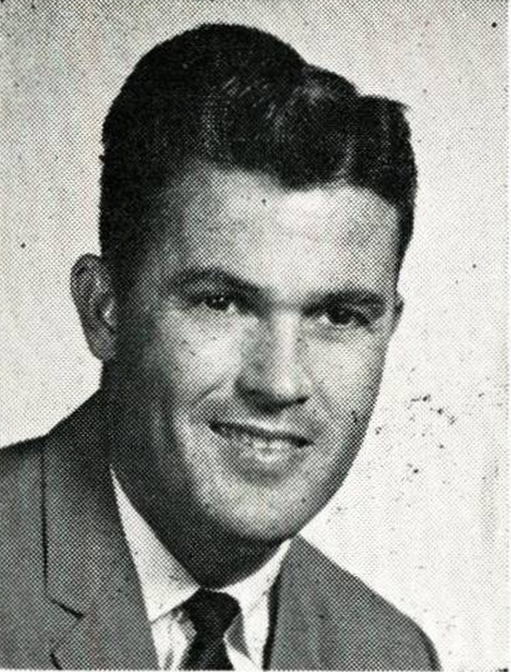
- McCulley, c. 1964

Personal information
- Born: November 29, 1931; Franklin, Mississippi, U.S.
- Died: November 25, 1992 (aged 60); Pensacola Beach, Florida, U.S.

Career information
- College: Louisiana Tech

Career history
- Houston (1960–1962) Backfield coach; Baylor (1963–1969) Backfield coach; Navy (1970–1972) Receivers coach & quarterbacks coach; Baltimore Colts (1973–1976) Receivers coach; Washington Redskins (1977) Receivers coach; San Francisco 49ers (1978) Head coach; New York Jets (1979–1981) Receivers coach; New York Jets (1982) Quarterbacks coach; Kansas City Chiefs (1983–1986) Quarterbacks coach

Head coaching record
- Regular season: 1–8 (.111)
- Coaching profile at Pro Football Reference

Pete McCulley (November 29, 1931 – November 25, 1992) was an American football coach. He served as the head coach of the National Football League (NFL)'s San Francisco 49ers for the first nine games of the 1978 season. Winning only one game during that span, he was fired and replaced with Fred O'Connor.

== College career ==
McCulley was a two-year letterman as quarterback at Louisiana Tech in 1954 and 1955.

He began his coaching career as an assistant at Stephen F. Austin, followed by two years as backfield coach at the University of Houston in 1960 and 1961. He was later quarterbacks and receivers coach at both Baylor from 1963 to 1969 and on Rick Forzano's staff at Navy from 1970 to 1972.

== Professional career ==
He entered the NFL as receivers coach on Howard Schnellenberger's staff with the Baltimore Colts in 1973. He remained with the Colts through the first two years of the Ted Marchibroda era, adding the title of conditioning coach in 1976. His departure from the Colts was a result of the January 21, 1977 dismissal of general manager Joe Thomas who had lost a power struggle to Marchibroda over player personnel decisions. McCulley joined George Allen's staff with the Washington Redskins as receivers coach two weeks later on February 4.

After a season with the Redskins, he signed a three-year contract as head coach of the San Francisco 49ers on January 10, 1978, succeeding Ken Meyer who had been fired earlier that day. He was reunited with Thomas who had been appointed 49ers general manager upon Edward J. DeBartolo Sr.'s purchase of the franchise prior to the 1977 season. McCulley had actually been Thomas' first choice just after he had joined the Redskins one year earlier. Allen denied Thomas permission to contact McCulley then, but eventually relented with a recommendation. McCulley was the 49ers' fourth different head coach in as many years and the second hired by Thomas. In his introductory press conference, he had stressed the importance of improving the team's passing game. He stated, "You make the big play with a passing game. You win in this league with a passing game." After a 1-8 start, he was later fired 9 games into his first season. When asked if he was surprised about his abrupt firing by the 49ers, he responded, "No, I haven't been surprised since I found out ice cream cones weren't filled all the way to the bottom." The quote eventually appeared in Reader's Digest which presented him with a $25 check that he never cashed.

He joined Walt Michaels' staff with the New York Jets as receivers coach on February 5, 1979, succeeding Dan Henning who had moved on to the Miami Dolphins. His dismissal from the Jets four years later on February 10, 1983, was one of the first acts as new head coach for Joe Walton, successor to Michaels whose retirement had been announced the previous day.

McCulley was named quarterbacks coach with the Kansas City Chiefs on February 17, 1983. In his first season with the ballclub, he played a key role in the development of Bill Kenney into a Pro Bowl quarterback. His four years with John Mackovic's staff ended on January 12, 1987, when new Chiefs coach Frank Gansz, who replaced the fired Mackovic, elected not to retain him.

== Later life ==
McCulley was the head coach of the Finland national American football team when it was European Championship of American football finalists in 1989 and 1991. He was to have served in a similar capacity with the Miami Tribe in the Professional Spring Football League.

== Head coaching record ==
Team	Year	Regular season				
Team	Year	Won	Lost	Ties	Win %	Finish
SF	1978	1	8	0	.111	Fired midseason
Total		1	8	0	.111	
