= Dan Melville =

American football player (born 1956)

No. 11
- Position: Punter

Personal information
- Born: March 4, 1956 (age 70); San Diego, California, U.S.
- Listed height: 6 ft 0 in (1.83 m)
- Listed weight: 185 lb (84 kg)

Career information
- High school: El Capitan (Lakeside, California)
- College: Grossmont (1975–1976); California (1977–1978)
- NFL draft: 1979: undrafted

Career history
- San Francisco 49ers (1979)

Awards and highlights
- 2× Second-team All-Pac-10 (1977, 1978)

Career NFL statistics
- Punts: 71
- Punt yards: 2,626
- Longest punts: 53
- Stats at Pro Football Reference

Daniel Lee Melville (born March 4, 1956) is an American former professional football player who was a punter for one season with the San Francisco 49ers of the National Football League (NFL). He played college football] at Grossmont College before transferring to the California Golden Bears.

== Early life and college ==
Daniel Lee Melville was born on March 4, 1956, in San Diego, California. He attended El Capitan High School in Lakeside, California.

Melville first played college football at Grossmont College from 1975 to 1976. He then transferred to the University of California, Berkeley, where he was a two-year letterman for the California Golden Bears from 1977 to 1978. He punted 44 times for 1,863 yards (42.3 average) his junior year in 1977, earning Coaches second-team All-Pac-10 honors. As a senior in 1978, he punted 57 times for 2,370 yards (41.6 average), garnering Coaches second-team All-Pac-10 recognition for the second consecutive season.

== Professional career ==
After going undrafted in the 1979 NFL draft, Melville signed with the San Francisco 49ers on May 11. He played in all 16 games for the 49ers during the 1979 season, totaling 71 punts for 2,626 yards and a 37.0 average. He also recorded three rushing attempts for zero yards, one fumble, and two fumble recoveries. Melville was released by the 49ers in 1980.
