= Jerry Aldridge =

American football player (born 1956)

No. 47
- Position: Halfback

Personal information
- Born: September 17, 1956 (age 70); Jacksonville, Texas, U.S.
- Listed height: 6 ft 2 in (1.88 m)
- Listed weight: 220 lb (100 kg)

Career information
- High school: Jacksonville
- College: Angelo State
- NFL draft: 1979: 5th round, 119th overall pick

Career history
- San Francisco 49ers (1980); Oakland Invaders (1983)

Awards and highlights
- First-team College Division All-American (1978)

Career NFL statistics
- Games played: 1
- Stats at Pro Football Reference

Jerry Charles Aldridge (born September 17, 1956) is an American former professional football player who was a halfback in the National Football League (NFL) and United States Football League (USFL). He played college football for the Angelo State Rams, earning AP College Division All-American honors, and leading the team to an NAIA championship in 1978.

Aldridge suffered a knee injury during San Francisco 49ers training camp ahead of the 1979 season and missed the entire year on injured reserve. He played with the 49ers in 1980.

Aldridge also played for the Oakland Invaders in the USFL, scoring a touchdown on an 80-yard pass play in June 1983. His son, Cory was a Major League Baseball outfielder.
