= W. T. White High School =

American public high school

Location
- 4505 Ridgeside Drive; Dallas, Texas 75244; United States
- Coordinates: 32°54′59″N 96°49′51″W

Information
- School type: Public, High School
- Motto: Longhorn Pride!
- School district: Dallas Independent School District
- Principal: Beth Wing
- Teaching staff: 137.12 (FTE)
- Grades: 9–12
- Enrollment: 2,074 (2023-2024)
- Student to teacher ratio: 15.13
- Colors: Texas Burnt Orange; White
- Mascot: The Longhorn
- Website: www.dallasisd.org/wtwhite

Warren Travis White High School is a public secondary school in Dallas, Texas (USA). W. T. White High School enrolls students in grades 9-12 and is a part of the Dallas Independent School District.

The school, named in honor of the Dallas school superintendent who served from 1946 to 1968, is located in North Dallas about a mile southwest of the Interstate 635 (LBJ Freeway) and Dallas North Tollway intersection. Parts of North Dallas are zoned to W. T. White, as well as sections of Addison, Carrollton, and Farmers Branch.

In 2015, the school was rated "Met Standard" by the Texas Education Agency.

== History ==
The school was established in 1964 and named for the superintendent then in office, Dr. Warren Travis White. The current principal is Beth Wing.

== Campus ==
The original school building was designed for 1,600 students. By 2015 W.T. White had over 2,300 students, which meant that the school was at 160% of its capacity. The campus had portable buildings installed to handle excess students. In 2015 the DISD board approved a $21 million renovation and expansion of the campus as part of a school improvement program worth almost $130 million; the renovation will add 39,045 square feet (3,627.4 m^{2}) of space. WRA Architects is in charge of the project and a graduate of W.T. White is the head architect. The project is scheduled for completion in the fall of 2017.

== Vocational academies ==
The school has some career-oriented academies, such as the Academy of Engineering.

== Demographics ==
In 2009, the state classified almost half of White's graduates as "college ready," or ready to undergo university studies. The State of Texas defined "college readiness" by scores on the ACT and SAT and in the 11th grade Texas Assessment of Knowledge and Skills (TAKS) tests."

In 2019 80.00% of the student body consisted of diverse students.

== Service area ==
Parts of North Dallas are zoned to W. T. White, as well as sections of Addison, Carrollton, and Farmers Branch.

Communities served as of 1967 include: Crestpark Club Estates (Farmers Branch).

Communities served as of 1969 include: Willow Park Square (Dallas).

== Athletics ==
The W.T. White Longhorns compete in the following sports:

- Baseball
- Basketball
- Cross Country
- Football
- Golf
- Soccer
- Softball
- Swimming and Diving
- Tennis
- Track and Field
- Volleyball
- Wrestling

=== Sports achievements ===
Football

City Championship-Dallas

1976

District Championships

1971 11-4A, 1974 11-4A, 1976 11-4A, 1977 11-4A, 1978 11-4A, 1979 11-4A, 1990 11-4A, 1994 12-4A

== Notable alumni ==
- Jean Barrett (1968) – former NFL offensive lineman 1973–1980, San Francisco 49ers
- Trey Beamon (1992) – former Major League Baseball outfielder 1996–98, Pittsburgh Pirates, San Diego Padres, Detroit Tigers
- David Beecroft (1974) – television actor (Falcon Crest, Melrose Place, Dr. Quinn, Medicine Woman)
- Vice Admiral John G. Cotton (1969) – former chief of United States Navy Reserve
- Bryan Holaday (2006) – Major League Baseball catcher for Detroit Tigers
- Karen Hughes (1974) – U.S. Under Secretary for Public Diplomacy and Public Affairs
- Gary Jacobs (1970) – executive producer and head writer of hit TV series Empty Nest; creator of Woops! and All-American Girl; writer on Newhart
- Calvin Murray (1989) – former Major League Baseball outfielder 1999–2004, San Francisco Giants, Texas Rangers, Chicago Cubs
- Ramón Núñez (2003) – English Football League Championship midfielder for Leeds United; Honduras national team 2007–present
- Jason Smith (2004) — offensive tackle for St. Louis Rams, second overall selection of 2009 NFL draft
- Scott Verplank (1982) – professional golfer
- Terrance Williams (2008) – wide receiver for Dallas Cowboys
