= Wade Bosarge =

American football player (born 1955)

No. 48, 25
- Position: Defensive back

Personal information
- Born: September 14, 1955 (age 71); Bayou La Batre, Alabama, U.S.
- Listed height: 5 ft 10 in (1.78 m)
- Listed weight: 175 lb (79 kg)

Career information
- High school: Peter F. Alba (Bayou La Batre)
- College: Tulsa
- NFL draft: 1977: undrafted

Career history
- Miami Dolphins (1977); New Orleans Saints (1977)
- Stats at Pro Football Reference

Wade Bosarge (born September 14, 1955) is an American former professional football player who was a defensive back in the National Football League (NFL). He played college football for the [Tulsa Golden Hurricane. He played in the NFL for the Miami Dolphins and New Orleans Saints in 1977.
