= Wilson Faumuina =

America Samoan gridiron football player (1954–1986)

No. 74
- Positions: Defensive tackle, defensive end

Personal information
- Born: June 11, 1954; American Samoa
- Died: September 26, 1986 (aged 32); San Francisco, California, U.S.
- Listed height: 6 ft 5 in (1.96 m)
- Listed weight: 275 lb (125 kg)

Career information
- High school: Balboa (San Francisco, California, U.S.)
- College: San Jose State
- NFL draft: 1977: 1st round, 20th overall pick

Career history
- Atlanta Falcons (1977–1981)

Awards and highlights
- Third-team All-American (1976)

Career NFL statistics
- Sacks: 13.5
- Fumble recoveries: 3
- Interceptions: 1
- Stats at Pro Football Reference

Wilson Faumuina (June 11, 1954 – September 26, 1986) was an American football defensive lineman who played five seasons in the National Football League (NFL) for the Atlanta Falcons. He died at age 32 of heart failure. Wilson attended Balboa High School in San Francisco and played both defensive end and offensive tackle. He was All City several times. Wilson then attended San Jose State from which he was selected by the Falcons as a first round draft pick, 20th overall in 1977 NFL draft. He played five seasons with the Falcons from 1977 to 1981.

Wilson Faumuina was one of the first Samoans to play in the NFL. He was the son of territorial senator Faumuina Tolopa.
