= David A. Hubbard =

American football player (born 1955)

David Hubbard
No. 70
- Position: Offensive tackle

Personal information
- Born: September 29, 1955 (age 71); Napa, California, U.S.
- Listed height: 6 ft 7 in (2.01 m)
- Listed weight: 270 lb (122 kg)

Career information
- High school: Vintage (Napa)
- College: BYU
- NFL draft: 1977: 5th round, 136th overall pick

Career history
- New Orleans Saints (1977)

Career NFL statistics
- Games played: 5
- Stats at Pro Football Reference

David A Hubbard (born September 29, 1955) is an American former professional football player who was an offensive tackle for the New Orleans Saints of the National Football League (NFL). He played college football for the BYU Cougars.

After his football career, Hubbard became a speaker and author on health and fitness. From 2013 to 2017 he was a pastor on staff at the Church of The Apostles in Atlanta, Georgia. Hubbard is presently Athletic Director and Director of Development for The Cumberland School, a private Christian school in Cobb County, Georgia.

== Early life ==
Hubbard grew up in Napa, California, where he was a member of the first graduating class of Vintage High School. In 1973, he received a full athletic scholarship to Brigham Young University, where he played offensive tackle and guard under LaVell Edwards. During his time at BYU, Hubbard played in the Fiesta Bowl and in the Senior Bowl.

== Professional career ==
Hubbard was selected by the New Orleans Saints in the fifth round of the 1977 NFL draft. He played for the team in 1977 under coach Hank Stram and also played for the Denver Broncos during short stint. After football, his playing weight combined with a serious back injury from a near fatal accident made it difficult to get and stay physically fit. In 1989, Hubbard began traveling extensively as a motivational speaker to corporate America on how to get fit for life. During those years Hubbard discovered that the greatest obstacle to personal fitness is time. He then began developing his unique approach to exercise, determined to come up with a simple fitness formula that would overcome the common obstacles and excuses keeping most people from getting and staying physically fit.

== Publishing career ==
In 2000 Hubbard was awarded a U.S. patent for his unique exercise method. He calls himself "America's Fitness Coach " and provides fitness advice in online articles and on television. His most recently published book is BAD CHUTE! Why most Americans fail with fitness..

== Personal life ==
Hubbard has been married twice. His first marriage lasted 16 years and produced four children. His second and current marriage to his wife Melinda produced two more children. Hubbard and his wife live in Marietta, Georgia
