= Jean Barrett (American football) =

American football player (born 1951)

No. 77
- Positions: Tackle, guard, center

Personal information
- Born: May 24, 1951 (age 75); Fort Worth, Texas, U.S.
- Listed height: 6 ft 6 in (1.98 m)
- Listed weight: 253 lb (115 kg)

Career information
- High school: W.T. White (Dallas, Texas)
- College: Tulsa
- NFL draft: 1972: 2nd round, 44th overall pick

Career history
- San Francisco 49ers (1973–1980)
- Stats at Pro Football Reference

Jean Barrett (born May 24, 1951) is an American former professional football player who was an offensive lineman for the San Francisco 49ers in the National Football League (NFL). He graduated W. T. White High School in Dallas, Texas, and played college football for the Tulsa Golden Hurricane.
