= Bob Ferrell =

American football player (born 1952)

Bobby Ferrell
No. 38
- Position: Running back

Personal information
- Born: November 13, 1952 (age 73); Los Angeles, California, U.S.

Career information
- College: UCLA

Career history
- Southern California Sun (1975); San Francisco 49ers (1976–1980)

Career statistics
- Rushing att-yards: 183-683
- Receptions-yards: 21-148
- Touchdowns: 3
- Stats at Pro Football Reference

Robert Steven Ferrell (born November 13, 1952, in Los Angeles, California) is an American former professional football player who was a running back for five seasons with the San Francisco 49ers of the National Football League (NFL). He played college football for the UCLA Bruins.
