= Fred O'Connor =

American football coach and administrator

Biographical details
- Born: September 1, 1939 (age 87); Brooklyn, New York, U.S.
- Education: East Stroudsburg State

Coaching career (HC unless noted)
- 1962–1963: Oceanside HS (NY) (assistant)
- 1964–1965: Newfield HS (NY) (assistant)
- 1966–1969: C. W. Post (assistant)
- 1970: Villanova (QB/WR)
- 1971: Maryland (QB/WR)
- 1972: Southern Miss (OC/QB)
- 1973: Villanova (OC)
- 1974: Florida Blazers (OB)
- 1975–1977: Chicago Bears (OB)
- 1978: San Francisco 49ers (OC)
- 1978: San Francisco 49ers (interim HC)
- 1979–1980: Washington Redskins (OB)
- 1981: Montreal Alouettes (OC)
- 1987–1989: Catholic University
- 2000: Florida Atlantic (WR)
- 2001–2002: Florida Atlantic (RB)
- 2003: Florida Atlantic (QB)
- 2004: Florida Atlantic (spec. asst. to the HC)
- 2004: Florida Atlantic (RB)
- 2005–2006: Florida Atlantic (spec. asst. to the HC)

Administrative career (AD unless noted)
- 1984–1990: Catholic

Head coaching record
- Overall: 1–6 (NFL); 17–13 (college)

Fred O'Connor (born September 1, 1939) is an American former football coach and administrator whose career spanned more than 30 years at the high school, collegiate, and professional levels. He served in coaching positions in the National Football League (NFL), Canadian Football League (CFL), and World Football League (WFL). Most notably, O'Connor was the interim head coach of the NFL's San Francisco 49ers for the last seven games of the 1978 season, posting a mark of 1–6. He also was the executive director of athletics at The Catholic University of America from May 1984 through June 1990 and served as the Cardinals head football coach for three seasons (1987–1989), compiling an overall college football record of 17 wins and 13 losses.

O'Connor began his professional football career as the offensive backfield coach on Jack Pardee's staffs with both the World Football League's Florida Blazers in 1974 and the Chicago Bears for three seasons from 1975 to 1977. He was reunited with Pardee in a similar capacity with the Washington Redskins on February 5, 1979. Coached three Hall of Fame Running Backs, Walter Payton, O.J. Simpson and John Riggins. Also coached in four All-Star games; 1976 Senior Bowl, 1978 Challenge Bowl and the 2009 and 2010 Texas vs The Nation games.

== Head coaching record ==
=== College ===
Year	Team	Overall	Conference	Standing	Bowl/playoffs
Catholic University Cardinals (NCAA Division III independent) (1987–1989)
1987	Catholic University	3–7			
1988	Catholic University	6–4			
1989	Catholic University	8–2			
Catholic University:		17–13			
Total:		17–13			

=== NFL ===
Team	Year	Regular season				
Team	Year	Won	Lost	Ties	Win %	Finish
SF	1978	1	6	0	.143	4th in NFC West
SF total		1	6	0	.143	
Total		1	6	0	.143	
