= 1978 NFL season =

American football season

Regular season
- Duration: September 2 – December 18, 1978

Playoffs
- Start date: December 24, 1978
- AFC Champions: Pittsburgh Steelers
- NFC Champions: Dallas Cowboys

Super Bowl XIII
- Date: January 21, 1979
- Site: Orange Bowl, Miami
- Champions: Pittsburgh Steelers

Pro Bowl
- Date: January 29, 1979
- Site: Los Angeles Memorial Coliseum

AFC teams: West, Central, East
NFC teams: West, Central, East

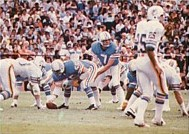
Oilers quarterback Dan Pastorini in the 1978 AFC wild card game

The 1978 NFL season was the 59th regular season of the National Football League. The league expanded the regular season from a 14-game schedule to 16 games, which it remained in place until 2021 when it was increased to 17 games. Furthermore, the playoff format was expanded from 8 teams to 10 teams by adding another wild card from each conference. The wild card teams played each other, with the winner advancing to the playoff round of eight teams.

The season ended with Super Bowl XIII when the Pittsburgh Steelers defeated the Dallas Cowboys 35–31 at the Orange Bowl in Miami.

The average salary for a player in 1978 was under $62,600, up 13.2 percent over the previous year. Fran Tarkenton was the highest-paid quarterback at $360,000 and running back O. J. Simpson was the highest paid player, at just under $733,400.

== Draft ==
The 1978 NFL draft was held from May 2 to 3 at New York City's Roosevelt Hotel. With the first pick, the Houston Oilers selected running back Earl Campbell of Texas, the Heisman Trophy winner.

== New officials ==
Future referees Tom Dooley, Dale Hamer and Dick Hantak were among those entering the league. Bernie Ulman, the head linesman for Super Bowl I and referee for Super Bowl IX, retired prior to the season, which left the NFL with only 14 crews for the 1978 season. Dooley (103), Hamer (104) and Hantak (105) were among the first officials to wear triple-digit numbers, joined by Bob Boylston (101), Gene Carrabine (102), Al Jury (106), Jim Kearney (107), Bob McLaughlin (108), Sid Semon (109), and Jim Osborne (110).

== Major rule changes ==
The league passed major rule changes to encourage offensive scoring. In 1977 – the last year of the so-called "Dead Ball Era" – teams scored an average of 17.2 points per game, the lowest total since 1942.

- To open up the passing game, defenders are permitted to make contact with receivers only to a point of five yards beyond the line of scrimmage. This applies only to the time before the ball is thrown, at which point any contact is pass interference. Previously, contact was allowed anywhere on the field. This is usually referred to as the "Mel Blount Rule"
- The offensive team may only make one forward pass during a play from scrimmage, but only if the ball does not cross the line and return behind the line prior to the pass.
- Double touching of a forward pass is legal, but batting a pass towards the opponent's end zone is illegal. Previously, a second offensive player could not legally catch a deflected pass unless a defensive player had touched it. This is usually referred to as the "Mel Renfro Rule". During a play in Super Bowl V, Baltimore Colts receiver Eddie Hinton tipped a pass intended for him. Renfro, the Cowboys defensive back, made a stab at the ball and it was ruled that he tipped it ever so slightly (which he denied) into the arms of Colts tight end John Mackey, who ran for a touchdown. Later, this rule was also the one in question during the Immaculate Reception in 1972. But despite these two incidents, the rule change did not occur until this season.
- The pass blocking rules were extended to permit extended arms and open hands.
- The penalty for intentional grounding is reduced from a loss of down and 15 yards to a loss of down and 10 yards from the previous spot (or at the spot of the foul if the spot is 10 yards or more behind the line of scrimmage). If the passer commits the foul in his own end zone, the defense scores a safety.
- A five-yard penalty and ten-second runoff is to be applied if a team intentionally commits a penalty or foul to stop the clock.
- Hurdling is no longer a foul.
- A seventh official, the Side Judge, is added to the officiating crew to help rule on legalities downfield and serve as a second umpire on field goals and extra points. The addition of fifteen officials (one per crew) forced three-digit numbers to be used for the first time. (The sixth official (line judge) was added thirteen years earlier.)
- All stadiums must have arrows by the numeric yard markers indicating the closer goal line.

== Regular season ==
=== New interconference scheduling ===
The change to a 16-game season also marked the start of a new scheduling format that saw a division in one conference play a division in another conference, rotating every season and repeating the process every three years. A change was also made to non-divisional opponents in a team's own conference, which became based on divisional positions from the previous season. Previously, teams played rotating groups of opponents in the other conference and in other divisions of their own conference, although some opponents were cut in 1976 and 1977 to allow for games against the Seahawks and Buccaneers. This format remains in effect, though it has been slightly modified over the years, most recently with the addition of two more divisions in 2002.

The interconference matchups for 1978 were as follows:

- AFC East vs. NFC East
- AFC Central vs. NFC West
- AFC West vs. NFC Central

=== Division races ===
Starting in 1978, and continuing through 1989 (except 1982), ten teams qualified for the playoffs: the winners of each of the divisions, and two wild-card teams in each conference. The two wild cards would meet for the right to face whichever of the three division winners had the best overall record (or, if the winner of the wild-card playoff was from the same division as that team, the division winner with the second best overall record). The tiebreaker rules were based on head-to-head competition, followed by division records, common opponents' records, and conference play.

==== National Football Conference ====
Week	Eastern		Central		Western		WildCard		WildCard	
1	3 teams	1–0	Chicago, Green Bay	1–0	3 teams	1–0				
2	Dallas, Washington	2–0	Chicago, Green Bay	2–0	L.A. Rams	2–0				
3	Washington	3–0	Chicago	3–0	L.A. Rams	3–0				
4	Washington	4–0	Green Bay	3–1	L.A. Rams	4–0	Chicago	3–1	Dallas	3–1
5	Washington	5–0	Green Bay	4–1	L.A. Rams	5–0	Chicago	3–2	3 teams	3–2
6	Washington	6–0	Green Bay	5–1	L.A. Rams	6–0	Dallas	4–2	Chicago	3–3
7	Washington	6–1	Green Bay	6–1	L.A. Rams	7–0	Dallas	5–2	Philadelphia	4–3
8	Washington	6–2	Green Bay	6–2	L.A. Rams	7–1	Dallas	6–2	N.Y. Giants	5–3
9	Washington	7–2	Green Bay	7–2	L.A. Rams	7–2	Dallas	6–3	Atlanta	5–4
10	Washington	7–3	Green Bay	7–3	L.A. Rams	8–2	Atlanta	6–4	Minnesota	6–4
11	Washington	8–3	Minnesota	7–4	L.A. Rams	9–2	Atlanta	7–4	Dallas	7–4
12	Washington	8–4	Minnesota	7–5	L.A. Rams	10–2	Dallas	8–4	Atlanta	7–5
13	Dallas	9–4	Minnesota	7–5–1	L.A.	10–3	Atlanta	8–5	Washington	8–5
14	Dallas	10–4	Minnesota	8–5–1	L.A. Rams	11–3	Green Bay	8–5–1	Atlanta	8–6
15	Dallas	11–4	Minnesota	8–6–1	L.A. Rams	11–4	Atlanta	9–6	Green Bay	8–6–1
16	Dallas	12–4	Minnesota	8–7–1	Los Angeles	12–4	Atlanta	9–7	Philadelphia	9–7

==== American Football Conference ====
Week	Eastern		Central		Western		WildCard		WildCard	
1	N.Y. Jets	1–0	Cleveland, Pittsburgh	1–0	3 teams	1–0				
2	N.Y. Jets	2–0	Cleveland, Pittsburgh	2–0	4 teams	1–1				
3	N.Y. Jets	2–1	Cleveland, Pittsburgh	3–0	Denver	2–1	Cleveland, Pittsburgh	3–0	Houston	2–1
4	N.Y. Jets	2–2	Pittsburgh	4–0	Denver	3–1	Cleveland	3–1	Houston	2–2
5	Miami	3–2	Pittsburgh	5–0	Denver	4–1	Houston	3–2	New England	3–2
6	Miami	4–2	Pittsburgh	6–0	Denver	4–2	New England	4–2	Oakland	4–2
7	Miami	5–2	Pittsburgh	7–0	Denver	5–2	New England	5–2	Oakland	5–2
8	New England	6–2	Pittsburgh	7–1	Denver	5–3	Houston	5–3	N.Y. Jets	5–3
9	New England	7–2	Pittsburgh	8–1	Denver	6–3	Miami	6–3	Houston	5–4
10	New England	8–2	Pittsburgh	9–1	Denver	6–4	Miami	7–3	Houston	6–4
11	New England	8–3	Pittsburgh	9–2	Denver	7–4	Miami	8–3	Houston	7–4
12	New England	9–3	Pittsburgh	10–2	Denver	8–4	Houston	8–4	Miami	8–4
13	New England	10–3	Pittsburgh	11–2	Denver	8–5	Houston	9–4	Miami	8–5
14	New England	10–4	Pittsburgh	12–2	Denver	9–5	Houston	9–5	Miami	9–5
15	New England	11–4	Pittsburgh	13–2	Denver	10–5	Houston	10–5	Miami	10–5
16	New England	11–5	Pittsburgh	14–2	Denver	10–6	Miami	11–5	Houston	10–6

== Final standings ==
1978 AFC East standings
	W	L	T	PCT	DIV	CONF	PF	PA	STK
New England Patriots^{(2)}	11	5	0	.688	6–2	9–3	358	286	L1
Miami Dolphins^{(4)}	11	5	0	.688	5–3	8–4	372	254	W3
New York Jets	8	8	0	.500	6–2	7–5	359	364	L2
Buffalo Bills	5	11	0	.313	2–6	4–10	302	354	W1
Baltimore Colts	5	11	0	.313	1–7	3–9	240	421	L5

AFC Central
	W	L	T	PCT	DIV	CONF	PF	PA	STK
Pittsburgh Steelers^{(1)}	14	2	0	.875	5–1	11–1	356	195	W5
Houston Oilers^{(5)}	10	6	0	.625	4–2	8–4	283	298	L1
Cleveland Browns	8	8	0	.500	1–5	4–8	334	356	L1
Cincinnati Bengals	4	12	0	.250	2–4	2–10	252	284	W3

AFC West
	W	L	T	PCT	DIV	CONF	PF	PA	STK
Denver Broncos^{(3)}	10	6	0	.625	7–1	8–4	282	198	L1
Oakland Raiders	9	7	0	.563	3–5	5–7	311	283	W1
Seattle Seahawks	9	7	0	.563	4–4	6–6	345	358	W1
San Diego Chargers	9	7	0	.563	5–3	7–5	355	309	W3
Kansas City Chiefs	4	12	0	.250	1–7	4–10	243	327	L2

NFC East
	W	L	T	PCT	DIV	CONF	PF	PA	STK
Dallas Cowboys^{(2)}	12	4	0	.750	7–1	9–3	384	208	W6
Philadelphia Eagles^{(5)}	9	7	0	.563	4–4	6–6	270	250	W1
Washington Redskins	8	8	0	.500	4–4	6–6	273	283	L5
St. Louis Cardinals	6	10	0	.375	3–5	6–6	248	296	W1
New York Giants	6	10	0	.375	2–6	5–9	264	298	L1

NFC Central
	W	L	T	PCT	DIV	CONF	PF	PA	STK
Minnesota Vikings^{(3)}	8	7	1	.531	5–2–1	7–4–1	294	306	L2
Green Bay Packers	8	7	1	.531	5–2–1	6–5–1	249	269	L2
Detroit Lions	7	9	0	.438	4–4	5–7	290	300	W2
Chicago Bears	7	9	0	.438	3–5	7–5	253	274	W2
Tampa Bay Buccaneers	5	11	0	.313	2–6	3–11	241	259	L4

NFC West
	W	L	T	PCT	DIV	CONF	PF	PA	STK
Los Angeles Rams^{(1)}	12	4	0	.750	4–2	10–2	316	245	W1
Atlanta Falcons^{(4)}	9	7	0	.563	5–1	8–4	240	290	L1
New Orleans Saints	7	9	0	.438	3–3	6–6	281	298	W1
San Francisco 49ers	2	14	0	.125	0–6	1–11	219	350	L1

=== Tiebreakers ===
- New England finished ahead of Miami in the AFC East based on better division record (6–2 to Dolphins' 5–3).
- Buffalo finished ahead of Baltimore in the AFC East based on head-to-head sweep (2–0).
- Oakland, Seattle, and San Diego finished 2nd, 3rd, and 4th, respectively, in the AFC West based on better record against common opponents (6–2 to Seahawks' 5–3 and Chargers' 4–4).
- Minnesota finished ahead of Green Bay in the NFC Central based on better head-to-head record (1–0–1).
- Los Angeles was top NFC seed over Dallas based on better head-to-head record (1–0).
- Detroit finished ahead of Chicago in the NFC Central based on better division record (4–4 to Bears' 3–5).
- Atlanta was the first NFC Wild Card based on better record against common opponents than Philadelphia (5–2 to Eagles' 5–3).
- St. Louis finished ahead of N.Y. Giants in the NFC East based on better division record (3–5 to Giants' 2–6).

== Playoffs ==
Note: The Pittsburgh Steelers (the AFC 1 seed) did not play the Houston Oilers (the 5 seed), nor did the Los Angeles Rams (the NFC 1 seed) play the Atlanta Falcons (the 4 seed), in the Divisional playoff round because those teams were in the same division.

Dec 31 – Schaefer Stadium
5	Houston	31
Dec 24 – Miami Orange Bowl	Jan 7 – Three Rivers Stadium
2*	New England	14
AFC
5	Houston	17	5	Houston	5
Dec 30 – Three Rivers Stadium
4	Miami	9	1	Pittsburgh	34
AFC Championship
3	Denver	10
Jan 21 – Miami Orange Bowl
1*	Pittsburgh	33
Divisional playoffs
Wild Card playoffs	A1	Pittsburgh	35
Dec 30 – Texas Stadium
N2	Dallas	31
Super Bowl XIII
4	Atlanta	20
Dec 24 – Fulton County Stadium	Jan 7 – Los Angeles Memorial Coliseum
2*	Dallas	27
NFC
5	Philadelphia	13	2	Dallas	28
Dec 31 – Los Angeles Memorial Coliseum
4	Atlanta	14	1	Los Angeles	0
NFC Championship
3	Minnesota	10
1*	Los Angeles	34

== Statistical leaders ==
=== Team ===
Points scored	Dallas Cowboys (384)
Total yards gained	New England Patriots (5,965)
Yards rushing	New England Patriots (3,165) then NFL record
Yards passing	San Diego Chargers (3,375)
Fewest points allowed	Pittsburgh Steelers (195)
Fewest total yards allowed	Los Angeles Rams (3,893)
Fewest rushing yards allowed	Dallas Cowboys (1,721)
Fewest passing yards allowed	Buffalo Bills (1,960)

=== Individual ===
Scoring	Frank Corral, Los Angeles Rams (118 points)
Touchdowns	David Sims, Seattle Seahawks (15 TDs)
Most field goals made	Frank Corral, Los Angeles Rams (29 FGs)
Rushing attempts	Walter Payton, Chicago Bears (333)
Rushing yards	Earl Campbell, Houston Oilers (1,450 yards)
Rushing touchdowns	David Sims, Seattle Seahawks (14 TDs)
Passes completed	Fran Tarkenton, Minnesota Vikings (345)
Pass attempts	Fran Tarkenton, Minnesota Vikings (572)
Passing yards	Fran Tarkenton, Minnesota Vikings (3,468 yards)
Passer rating	Roger Staubach, Dallas Cowboys (84.9 rating)
Passing touchdowns	Terry Bradshaw, Pittsburgh Steelers (28 TDs)
Pass receiving	Rickey Young, Minnesota Vikings (88 catches)
Pass receiving yards	Wesley Walker, New York Jets (1,169 yards)
Receiving touchdowns	John Jefferson, San Diego Chargers (13 TDs)
Punt returns	Rick Upchurch, Denver Broncos (13.7 average yards)
Kickoff returns	Steve Odom, Green Bay Packers (27.1 average yards)
Interceptions	Thom Darden, Cleveland Browns (10)
Punting	Pat McInally, Cincinnati Bengals (43.1 average yards)

== Awards ==
Most Valuable Player	Terry Bradshaw, quarterback, Pittsburgh
Coach of the Year	Jack Patera, Seattle
Offensive Player of the Year	Earl Campbell, running back, Houston Oilers
Defensive Player of the Year	Randy Gradishar, linebacker, Denver
Offensive Rookie of the Year	Earl Campbell, running back, Houston Oilers
Defensive Rookie of the Year	Al Baker, defensive end, Detroit Lions
Man of the Year	Roger Staubach, quarterback, Dallas
Comeback Player of the Year	John Riggins, running back, Washington

== Coaching changes ==
=== Offseason ===
- Buffalo Bills: Jim Ringo was fired. Chuck Knox then joined the Bills after leaving the Los Angeles Rams.
- Chicago Bears: Jack Pardee resigned to join the Washington Redskins. Neill Armstrong was named as the Bears' new head coach.
- Cleveland Browns: Sam Rutigliano was hired as the team's new head coach. Forrest Gregg was fired before the last game of the 1977 season. Defensive coordinator Dick Modzelewski served as interim during the team's final game in 1977.
- Detroit Lions: Tommy Hudspeth was fired and replaced by Monte Clark.
- Kansas City Chiefs: Marv Levy was hired as head coach. After an 0–5 start in 1977, Paul Wiggin was fired and defensive backs coach Tom Bettis was named interim.
- Los Angeles Rams: Chuck Knox left to join the Bills. George Allen, who previously coached the Rams from 1966 to 1970, was hired as Knox's replacement, but was fired after two exhibition games. Defensive coordinator Ray Malavasi was then promoted to head coach.
- New Orleans Saints: Hank Stram was fired and replaced by Dick Nolan.
- St. Louis Cardinals: Don Coryell left, and Bud Wilkinson was hired as the new Cardinals head coach.
- San Francisco 49ers: Ken Meyer was fired and replaced by Pete McCulley.
- Washington Redskins: George Allen was replaced by Jack Pardee.

=== In-season ===
- Cincinnati Bengals: Bill Johnson was replaced by Homer Rice after the Bengals started 0–5.
- New England Patriots: The team suspended Chuck Fairbanks for the last regular season game. Fairbanks had been in talks all season to join the University of Colorado Buffaloes, breaching his contract with the Patriots. Coordinators Hank Bullough and Ron Erhardt took over as co-interim head coaches for the Week 16 game. Fairbanks was reinstated as head coach for the playoffs, but left in the off-season to join Colorado.
- San Diego Chargers: Tommy Prothro was fired after a 1–3 start, including the "Holy Roller" loss to the Oakland Raiders. He was replaced by Don Coryell.
- San Francisco 49ers: Pete McCulley was fired after a 1–8 start. Fred O'Connor served as interim for the last seven games.

== Uniform changes ==
- The Atlanta Falcons switched from white to gray pants. TV numbers were moved from the sleeves to the shoulders, and the Falcon logo on the helmet was repeated on the sleeves. Numbers on white jerseys changed from black to red.
- The Baltimore Colts switched from gray to white face masks.
- The Denver Broncos wore orange pants with their white jerseys for the first time since 1971.
- The New York Jets introduced new uniforms, switching from white helmets and gray face masks to green helmets and white face masks. They also unveiled a new logo featuring a stylized "JETS" with a silhouette of a modern jet airplane extending to the right from the "J". They wore their old-style jerseys with the new-style helmets during the preseason, then debuted new jerseys for the regular season.
- The Washington Redskins switched from gray to gold face masks.

== Television ==
ABC, CBS, and NBC each signed four-year contracts to renew their rights to broadcast Monday Night Football, the NFC package, and the AFC package, respectively. The new contracts are adjusted for the expanded season, with CBS awarded the rights to the new NFC wild card game, and NBC the rights to the new AFC wild card game. The teams of Dick Enberg and Merlin Olsen and Curt Gowdy and John Brodie began the season as NBC's co-head crews, while Jim Simpson was demoted from No. 2 play-by-play. This would be Gowdy's last season on NBC as network executives wanted to promote Enberg to No. 1, but let Gowdy call the Super Bowl. Mike Adamle joined NBC's pregame show NFL '78 as an analyst. Additionally; Simpson would leave after Week 2 of the following season to join the newly launched ESPN.

Meanwhile, former Miss Ohio USA Jayne Kennedy replaced Phyllis George as reporter on The NFL Today.
