= 1981 St. Louis Cardinals (NFL) season =

American football team season

1981 St. Louis Cardinals season
- Owner: Bill Bidwill
- Head coach: Jim Hanifan
- Home stadium: Busch Memorial Stadium

Results
- Record: 7–9
- Division place: 5th NFC East
- Playoffs: Did not qualify
- Pro Bowlers: None

The 1981 St. Louis Cardinals season was the 62nd season the franchise was in the league. The team improved on their previous output of 5–11, winning seven games. Despite the improvement the team failed for the sixth consecutive season to reach the playoffs.

After a 3–7 start, including a horrendous 52–10 loss to the Eagles on November 8, Head Coach Jim Hanifan benched Jim Hart for Neil Lomax. The team would win four of its last six games.

== Offseason ==
=== NFL draft ===
1981 St. Louis Cardinals draft
Round	Pick	Player	Position	College	Notes
1	5	E. J. Junior *	Linebacker	Alabama	
2	33	Neil Lomax *	Quarterback	Portland State	
3	61	Jeff Griffin	Cornerback	Utah	
4	88	Steve Rhodes	Wide receiver	Oklahoma	
5	116	John Gillen	Linebacker	Illinois	
6	143	Dave Ahrens	Linebacker	Wisconsin	
7	171	Kevin Donnalley	Defensive back	North Dakota State	
8	198	Mike Fisher	Wide receiver	Baylor	
9	226	Stump Mitchell	Running back	The Citadel	
10	253	James Mallard	Wide receiver	Alabama	
10	263	Jim Joiner	Wide receiver	Miami (FL)	
11	281	Mike Sherrod	Tight end	Illinois	
12	309	Joe Adams	Guard	Nebraska	
Made roster * Made at least one Pro Bowl during career

=== Undrafted free agents ===
1981 undrafted free agents of note
Player	Position	College
John Allman	Defensive back	Indiana State
Tom Brazill	Defensive back	Wisconsin–La Crosse
Jim Schletzer	Punter	North Carolina

== Personnel ==
=== Staff ===
1981 St. Louis Cardinals staff
Front office: President – Bill Bidwill; Vice President of Operations – Joe Sullivan; Director of Pro Personnel – Larry Wilson; Director of Player Personnel – George Boone; Head coaches: Head Coach – Jim Hanifan; Special Assistant to the Head Coach – Leon McLaughlin; Offensive coaches: Quarterbacks – Harry Gilmer; Offensive Backfield – Dick Jamieson; Receivers – Emmitt Thomas; Offensive Line – Tom Lovat	Defensive coaches: Defensive Coordinator – Tom Bettis; Defensive Line – Rudy Feldman; Defensive Secondary – Bill Atkins; Special teams coaches: Special Teams – Chuck Banker; Strength and conditioning: Flexibility and Strength – Don Brown

=== Roster ===
1981 St. Louis Cardinals roster
Quarterbacks (QB): 17 Jim Hart; 16 Rusty Lisch; 15 Neil Lomax; Running backs (RB): 32 Ottis Anderson; 39 Willard Harrell; 40 Randy Love; 30 Stump Mitchell; 24 Wayne Morris; Wide receivers (WR): 86 Ralph Clayton; 85 Mel Gray; 25 Roy Green S; 83 Pat Tilley; Tight ends (TE): 80 Chris Combs; 89 Greg LaFleur	Offensive linemen (OL): 71 Joe Bostic G; 51 Tom Brahaney C; 64 Randy Clark C/G; 66 George Collins T; 60 Barney Cotton G; 72 Dan Dierdorf T; 62 Dale Markham T; 70 Art Plunkett T; 68 Terry Stieve G; Defensive linemen (DL): 69 Rush Brown DT; 63 Kirby Criswell DT; 73 Mike Dawson DT; 75 Curtis Greer DE; 76 Stafford Mays DE; 82 Bob Pollard DE; 79 Bruce Radford DE	Linebackers (LB): 58 Dave Ahrens MLB; 52 Charles Baker OLB; 59 Calvin Favron OLB; 57 John Gillen MLB; 54 E. J. Junior OLB; 55 Eric Williams OLB; Defensive backs (DB): 43 Steve Carpenter SS; 44 Tim Collier CB; 35 Jeff Griffin CB; 46 Charles Johnson CB; 38 Lee Nelson SS; 22 Roger Wehrli CB; 42 Herb Williams FS; Special teams (ST): 18 Carl Birdsong P; 11 Neil O'Donoghue K	Reserve: 65 Joe Adams G (IR); 27 Carl Allen CB (IR); 61 Ron Coder G (IR); 50 Doak Field LB (IR); 37 Ken Greene S (IR); 28 Jim Joiner WR (IR); 56 Tim Kearney LB (IR); 29 James Mallard WR (NF-Inj.); 87 Doug Marsh TE (IR); 48 Don Schwartz S (IR); 84 Dave Stief WR (IR); 74 Ken Times DT (IR); Rookies in italics

== Schedule ==
Week	Date	Opponent	Result	Record	Venue	Attendance
1	September 6	Miami Dolphins	**L** 7–20	0–1	Busch Memorial Stadium	50,351
2	September 13	at **Dallas Cowboys**	**L** 17–30	0–2	Texas Stadium	63,602
3	September 20	**Washington Redskins**	**W** 40–30	1–2	Busch Memorial Stadium	47,592
4	September 27	at Tampa Bay Buccaneers	**L** 10–20	1–3	Tampa Stadium	65,850
5	October 4	**Dallas Cowboys**	**W** 20–17	2–3	Busch Memorial Stadium	49,477
6	October 11	at **New York Giants**	**L** 14–34	2–4	Giants Stadium	67,128
7	October 18	at Atlanta Falcons	**L** 20–41	2–5	Atlanta–Fulton County Stadium	51,458
8	October 25	Minnesota Vikings	**W** 30–17	3–5	Busch Memorial Stadium	48,039
9	November 1	at **Washington Redskins**	**L** 21–42	3–6	RFK Stadium	50,643
10	November 8	**Philadelphia Eagles**	**L** 10–52	3–7	Busch Memorial Stadium	48,421
11	November 15	Buffalo Bills	**W** 24–0	4–7	Busch Memorial Stadium	46,214
12	November 22	at Baltimore Colts	**W** 35–24	5–7	Memorial Stadium	24,784
13	November 29	at New England Patriots	**W** 27–20	6–7	Schaefer Stadium	39,946
14	December 6	New Orleans Saints	**W** 30–3	7–7	Busch Memorial Stadium	46,923
15	December 13	**New York Giants**	**L** 10–20	7–8	Busch Memorial Stadium	47,358
16	December 20	at **Philadelphia Eagles**	**L** 0–38	7–9	Veterans Stadium	56,656
Note: Intra-division opponents are in **bold** text.

== Standings ==
NFC East
	W	L	T	PCT	DIV	CONF	PF	PA	STK
Dallas Cowboys^{(2)}	12	4	0	.750	6–2	8–4	367	277	L1
Philadelphia Eagles^{(4)}	10	6	0	.625	4–4	7–5	368	221	W1
New York Giants^{(5)}	9	7	0	.563	5–3	8–6	295	257	W3
Washington Redskins	8	8	0	.500	3–5	6–6	347	349	W3
St. Louis Cardinals	7	9	0	.438	2–6	4–8	315	408	L2
