= 1980 St. Louis Cardinals (NFL) season =

American football team season

1980 St. Louis Cardinals season
- Owner: Bill Bidwill
- Head coach: Jim Hanifan
- Home stadium: Busch Memorial Stadium

Results
- Record: 5–11
- Division place: 4th NFC East
- Playoffs: Did not qualify
- Pro Bowlers: T Dan Dierdorf; RB Ottis Anderson; WR Pat Tilley

The 1980 St. Louis Cardinals season was the 61st season the team was in the league. The team matched their previous output of 5–11. The team failed to reach the playoffs for the fifth consecutive season. After the season, Jon Brooks retired.

== Offseason ==
=== NFL draft ===
1980 St. Louis Cardinals draft
Round	Pick	Player	Position	College	Notes
1	6	Curtis Greer	Defensive end	Michigan	
2	33	Doug Marsh	Tight end	Michigan	
3	60	John Sinnott	Tackle	Brown	
3	81	Charles Baker	Linebacker	New Mexico	
4	89	Rusty Lisch	Quarterback	Notre Dame	
6	142	Bill Acker	Nose tackle	Texas	
7	171	Ben Apuna	Linebacker	Arizona State	
8	198	Dupree Branch	Defensive back	Colorado State	
8	211	Grant Hudson	Defensive tackle	Virginia	
9	225	Stafford Mays	Defensive end	Washington	
10	255	Rush Brown	Defensive tackle	Ball State	
11	282	Delrick Brown	Defensive back	Houston	
12	309	Tyron Gray	Wide receiver	Washington State	
Made roster

== Personnel ==
=== Staff ===
1980 St. Louis Cardinals staff
Front office: President – Bill Bidwill; Vice President of Operations – Joe Sullivan; Director of Pro Personnel – Larry Wilson; Director of Player Personnel – George Boone; Head coaches: Head Coach – Jim Hanifan; Special Assistant to the Head Coach – Leon McLaughlin; Offensive coaches: Quarterbacks/Receivers – Harry Gilmer; Offensive Backfield – Dick Jamieson; Offensive Line – Tom Lovat; Offensive Line – Duane Putnam	Defensive coaches: Defensive Coordinator – Tom Bettis; Defensive Line – Rudy Feldman; Defensive Secondary – Bill Atkins; Special teams coaches: Special Teams – Chuck Banker; Strength and conditioning: Flexibility and Strength – Don Brown

=== Roster ===
1980 St. Louis Cardinals roster
Quarterbacks (QB): 17 Jim Hart; 16 Rusty Lisch; 14 Mike Loyd; Running backs (RB): 32 Ottis Anderson; 33 Theotis Brown; 39 Willard Harrell; 40 Randy Love; 24 Wayne Morris; 36 Rod Phillips; Wide receivers (WR): 85 Mel Gray; 46 Jeff Lee; 21 Dave Stief; Tight ends (TE): 80 Chris Combs; 87 Doug Marsh; 89 Gary Parris	Offensive linemen (OL): 71 Joe Bostic G; 51 Tom Brahaney C; 64 Randy Clark C/G; 61 Ron Coder G; 66 George Collins T; 60 Barney Cotton G; 72 Dan Dierdorf T; 70 Mark Goodspeed T; Defensive linemen (DL): 67 Bill Acker NT; 69 Rush Brown NT; 63 Kirby Criswell DE; 74 Oudious Lee NT; 76 Stafford Mays DE; 82 Bob Pollard DE	Linebackers (LB): 57 Mark Arneson OLB; 52 Charles Baker OLB; 65 Jon Brooks OLB; 59 Calvin Favron ILB; 50 Jeff McIntyre ILB; 53 Steve Neils OLB; 58 Tom Seabron OLB; Defensive backs (DB): 27 Carl Allen CB; 44 Tim Collier CB; 37 Ken Greene FS; 38 Lee Nelson SS; 23 Ken Stone FS; 22 Roger Wehrli CB; Special teams (ST): 11 Neil O'Donoghue K; 10 Larry Swider P	Reserve: -- John Barefield LB (IR); 81 Mark Bell WR (IR); 73 Mike Dawson NT (IR); 25 Roy Green S (IR); 75 Curtis Greer DE (IR); 56 Tim Kearney LB (IR); 68 Terry Stieve G (IR); 83 Pat Tilley WR (IR); 55 Eric Williams LB (IR); 62 Keith Wortman T (IR); 78 Ron Yankowski DE (IR); Rookies in italics

== Schedule ==
Week	Date	Opponent	Result	Record	Venue	Attendance
1	September 7	**New York Giants**	**L** 35–41	0–1	Busch Memorial Stadium	49,122
2	September 14	at San Francisco 49ers	**L** 21–24	0–2	Candlestick Park	49,999
3	September 21	at Detroit Lions	**L** 7–20	0–3	Pontiac Silverdome	80,027
4	September 28	**Philadelphia Eagles**	**W** 24–14	1–3	Busch Memorial Stadium	49,079
5	October 5	at New Orleans Saints	**W** 40–7	2–3	Louisiana Superdome	45,388
6	October 12	Los Angeles Rams	**L** 13–21	2–4	Busch Memorial Stadium	50,230
7	October 19	at **Washington Redskins**	**L** 0–23	2–5	RFK Stadium	51,060
8	October 26	at Baltimore Colts	**W** 17–10	3–5	Memorial Stadium	33,506
9	November 2	**Dallas Cowboys**	**L** 24–27	3–6	Busch Memorial Stadium	50,701
10	November 9	Atlanta Falcons	**L** 27–33	3–7	Busch Memorial Stadium	48,662
11	November 16	at **Dallas Cowboys**	**L** 21–31	3–8	Texas Stadium	52,567
12	November 23	Kansas City Chiefs	**L** 13–21	3–9	Busch Memorial Stadium	42,871
13	November 30	at **New York Giants**	**W** 23–7	4–9	Giants Stadium	65,852
14	December 7	Detroit Lions	**W** 24–23	5–9	Busch Memorial Stadium	46,966
15	December 14	at **Philadelphia Eagles**	**L** 3–17	5–10	Veterans Stadium	68,969
16	December 21	**Washington Redskins**	**L** 7–31	5–11	Busch Memorial Stadium	35,942
Note: Intra-division opponents are in **bold** text.

== Standings ==
NFC East
	W	L	T	PCT	DIV	CONF	PF	PA	STK
Philadelphia Eagles^{(2)}	12	4	0	.750	6–2	9–3	384	222	L1
Dallas Cowboys^{(4)}	12	4	0	.750	6–2	9–3	454	311	W1
Washington Redskins	6	10	0	.375	4–4	5–7	261	293	W3
St. Louis Cardinals	5	11	0	.313	2–6	4–10	299	350	L2
New York Giants	4	12	0	.250	2–6	3–9	249	425	L2
