= 1982 St. Louis Cardinals (NFL) season =

American football team season

1982 St. Louis Cardinals season
- Owner: Bill Bidwill
- Head coach: Jim Hanifan
- Defensive coordinator: Tom Bettis & Floyd Peters
- Home stadium: Busch Stadium

Results
- Record: 5–4
- Division place: 6th NFC (3rd NFC East)
- Playoffs: Lost Wild Card Playoffs (at Packers) 16–41
- Pro Bowlers: None

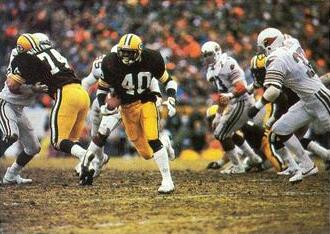
The Cardinals playing against the Packers in the 1982 NFC First Round Playoff game.

The 1982 St. Louis Cardinals season was the franchise’s 63rd year with the National Football League and the 23rd season in St. Louis. It was the Cardinals first postseason appearance since 1975, and their last before the team’s 1988 move to Arizona, as well as the last NFL postseason appearance for any St. Louis franchise until the Rams’ Super Bowl championship season of 1999. The 1982 Football Cardinals were 5–4 during the regular-season.

In the postseason the Cardinals faced the Green Bay Packers and were trounced 41–16. This season would be the last season the Cardinals made the playoffs until 1998, when the team was far into its tenure in Arizona. This was the only postseason appearance for the franchise between 1976 and 1997.

== Offseason ==
=== NFL draft ===
Round	Pick	Player	Position	School/Club team

== Personnel ==
=== Staff ===
1982 St. Louis Cardinals staff
Front office: President – Bill Bidwill; Director of pro personnel – Larry Wilson; Director of player personnel – George Boone; Head coaches: Head coach – Jim Hanifan; Special assistant to the head coach – Leon McLaughlin; Offensive coaches: Quarterbacks – Harry Gilmer; Offensive Backfield – Dick Jamieson; Receivers – Emmitt Thomas; Offensive Line – Tom Lovat	Defensive coaches: Assistant head coach/defense – Floyd Peters; Defensive coordinator – Tom Bettis; Linebackers – Rudy Feldman; Special teams coaches: Special Teams – Chuck Banker; Strength and conditioning: Flexibility and Strength – Don Brown

=== Roster ===
1982 St. Louis Cardinals roster
Quarterbacks (QB): 17 Jim Hart; 16 Rusty Lisch; 15 Neil Lomax; Running backs (RB): 32 Ottis Anderson; 31 Earl Ferrell; 39 Willard Harrell; 40 Randy Love; 30 Stump Mitchell; 24 Wayne Morris; Wide receivers (WR): 81 Roy Green; 84 Mike Shumann; 86 Ken Thompson; 83 Pat Tilley; Tight ends (TE): 89 Greg LaFleur; 87 Doug Marsh; 87 Eddie McGill	Offensive linemen (OL): 71 Joe Bostic G; 64 Randy Clark C/G; 72 Dan Dierdorf C; 66 George Collins G; 70 Art Plunkett T; 63 Tootie Robbins T; 74 Bob Sebro G/C; 67 Luis Sharpe T; 68 Terry Stieve G; Defensive linemen (DL): 69 Rush Brown DT; 73 Mike Dawson DT; 65 David Galloway DT; 75 Curtis Greer DE; 76 Stafford Mays DE; 79 Bruce Thornton DT/DE; 78 Elois Grooms DE	Linebackers (LB): 58 Dave Ahrens MLB; 51 Kurt Allerman OLB; 52 Charles Baker OLB; 57 John Gillen OLB; 54 E. J. Junior OLB; 50 Craig Puki MLB; Defensive backs (DB): 27 Carl Allen CB; 41 Vance Bedford CB; 46 Don Bessillieu SS; 37 Ken Greene FS; 35 Jeff Griffin CB; 38 Lee Nelson SS; 23 Benny Perrin FS; 21 Dave Stief FS; 42 Herb Williams SS; Special teams (ST): 18 Carl Birdsong P; 11 Neil O'Donoghue K	Reserve: 13 David Bolton WR (IR); 60 Barney Cotton G (IR); 56 Darnell Dailey LB (IR); 85 Mel Gray WR (IR); -- Rick Kehr T (IR); 53 Craig Shaffer LB (IR); 44 Wayne Smith CB (IR); 22 Roger Wehrli CB (IR); Rookies in italics

== Regular season ==
=== Schedule ===
Week	Date	Opponent	Result	Record	Venue	Attendance
1	September 12	at New Orleans Saints	**W** 21–7	1–0	Louisiana Superdome	58,673
2	September 19	**Dallas Cowboys**	**L** 7–24	1–1	Busch Memorial Stadium	50,705
–	Players' strike					
3	November 21	San Francisco 49ers	**L** 20–31	1–2	Busch Memorial Stadium	38,064
4	November 28	at Atlanta Falcons	**W** 23–20	2–2	Atlanta–Fulton County Stadium	33,411
5	December 5	at **Philadelphia Eagles**	**W** 23–20	3–2	Veterans Stadium	63,622
6	December 12	**Washington Redskins**	**L** 7–12	3–3	Busch Memorial Stadium	35,308
7	December 19	at Chicago Bears	**W** 10–7	4–3	Soldier Field	43,270
8	December 26	**New York Giants**	**W** 24–21	5–3	Busch Memorial Stadium	39,824
9	January 2, 1983	at **Washington Redskins**	**L** 0–28	5–4	RFK Stadium	55,045
Note: Intra-division opponents are in **bold** text.

=== Week 3 ===
Team	1	2	3	4	Total
• 49ers	3	7	7	14	31
Cardinals	0	7	6	7	20

- Date: November 21
- Location: Busch Stadium
- Game start: 4:00 p.m. EST
- Game attendance: 38,064
- Game weather: 53 °F (11.7 °C); wind 10 miles per hour (16 km/h; 8.7 kn)
- Referee: Tom Dooley

Scoring summary
Q1	SF	Wersching 36 yard field goal	SF 3–0
Q2	SF	Moore 1 yard run (Wersching kick)	SF 10–0
Q2	STL	Green 17 yard pass from Lomax (O'Donoghue kick)	SF 10–7
Q3	STL	O'Donoghue 30 yard field goal	Tie 10–10
Q3	STL	O'Donoghue 32 yard field goal	STL 13–10
Q3	SF	Francis 6 yard pass from Montana (Wersching kick)	SF 17–13
Q4	SF	Clark 33 yard pass from Montana (Wersching kick)	SF 24–13
Q4	SF	Cooper 17 yard pass from Montana (Wersching kick)	SF 31–13
Q4	STL	Anderson 2 yard run (O'Donoghue kick)	SF 31–20

=== Playoffs ===
Round	Date	Opponent (seed)	Result	Record	Venue	Attendance
Wildcard	January 8, 1983	at Green Bay Packers (3)	**L** 16–41	0–1	Lambeau Field	54,282

==== NFC: Green Bay Packers 41, St. Louis Cardinals 16 ====
Game summary

Quarter	1	2	3	4	Total
Cardinals	3	6	0	7	**16**
**Packers**	7	21	10	3	**41**

at Lambeau Field, Green Bay, Wisconsin

- Game time: 12:30 p.m. EST/11:30 a.m. CST
- Game weather: 26 °F (−3.3 °C), overcast
- Game attendance: 54,282
- Referee: Fred Wyant
- TV announcers (CBS): Tim Ryan and Johnny Morris

Game information
- **Scoring**
  - STL – field goal O'Donoghue 18 STL 3–0
  - GB – Jefferson 60 pass from Dickey (Stenerud kick) GB 7–3
  - GB – Lofton 20 pass from Dickey (Stenerud kick) GB 14–3
  - GB – Ivery 2 run (Stenerud kick) GB 21–3
  - GB – Ivery 4 pass from Dickey (Stenerud kick) GB 28–3
  - STL – Tilley 5 pass from Lomax (kick blocked) GB 28–9
  - GB – field goal Stenerud 46 GB 31–9
  - GB – Jefferson 7 pass from Dickey (Stenerud kick) GB 38–9
  - GB – field goal Stenerud 34 GB 41–9
  - STL – Shumann 18 pass from Lomax (O'Donoghue kick) GB 41–16

== Standings ==
NFC East
	W	L	T	PCT	DIV	CONF	PF	PA	STK
Washington Redskins^{(1)}	8	1	0	.889	6–1	8–1	190	128	W4
Dallas Cowboys^{(2)}	6	3	0	.667	2–1	4–2	226	145	L2
St. Louis Cardinals^{(6)}	5	4	0	.556	3–1	5–4	135	170	L1
New York Giants	4	5	0	.444	2–3	3–5	164	160	W1
Philadelphia Eagles	3	6	0	.333	1–5	1–5	191	195	L1

NFC
#	Team	W	L	T	PCT	PF	PA	STK
Seeded postseason qualifiers
1	Washington Redskins	8	1	0	.889	190	128	W4
2	Dallas Cowboys	6	3	0	.667	226	145	L2
3	Green Bay Packers	5	3	1	.611	226	169	L1
4 (Note: Minnesota (4–1), Atlanta (4–3), St. Louis (5–4), Tampa Bay (3–3) seeds were determined by best won-lost record in conference games.)	Minnesota Vikings	5	4	0	.556	187	198	W1
5	Atlanta Falcons	5	4	0	.556	183	199	L2
6	St. Louis Cardinals	5	4	0	.556	135	170	L1
7	Tampa Bay Buccaneers	5	4	0	.556	158	178	W3
8 (Note: Detroit finished ahead of New Orleans and the N.Y. Giants based on best conference record (4–4 to Saints’ 3–5 to Giants’ 3–5).)	Detroit Lions	4	5	0	.444	181	176	W1
Did not qualify for the postseason
9	New Orleans Saints	4	5	0	.444	129	160	W1
10	New York Giants	4	5	0	.444	164	160	W1
11 (Note: San Francisco finished ahead of Chicago, and Chicago finished ahead of Philadelphia, based on conference record (49ers’ 2–3 to Bears’ 2–5 to Eagles’ 1–5).)	San Francisco 49ers	3	6	0	.333	209	206	L1
12	Chicago Bears	3	6	0	.333	141	174	L1
13	Philadelphia Eagles	3	6	0	.333	191	195	L1
14	Los Angeles Rams	2	7	0	.222	200	250	W1
Tiebreakers

== Awards and records ==
- Luis Sharpe, NFL All-Rookie team
