= 1983 St. Louis Cardinals (NFL) season =

American football team season

1983 St. Louis Cardinals season
- Owner: Bill Bidwill
- Head coach: Jim Hanifan
- Home stadium: Busch Stadium

Results
- Record: 8–7–1
- Division place: 3rd NFC East
- Playoffs: Did not qualify
- Pro Bowlers: WR Roy Green; P Carl Birdsong

The 1983 St. Louis Cardinals season was the 64th season the team was in the National Football League. The Cardinals won eight games, including victories over both participants in that year's AFC Championship Game, the Raiders and Seahawks. However, the team also lost in meetings over both participants of the 1983 NFC Championship Game, the 49ers and the Redskins. Despite their winning record, the team failed to reach the playoffs.

The Cardinals had a winning record, despite being outscored by a total of 54 points during the regular season. In fact, St. Louis’ 428 points surrendered was, to that point, the most points given up by a team with a winning record in NFL history; it is still second-most all time.

== Personnel ==
=== Staff ===
1983 St. Louis Cardinals staff
Front office: President – Bill Bidwill; Director of Pro Personnel – Larry Wilson; Director of Player Personnel – George Boone; Head coaches: Head Coach – Jim Hanifan; Special Assistant to the Head Coach – Leon McLaughlin; Offensive coaches: Offensive Coordinator – Rod Dowhower; Offensive Backfield – Dick Jamieson; Receivers – Emmitt Thomas; Offensive Line – Tom Lovat	Defensive coaches: Assistant Head Coach/Defense – Floyd Peters; Defensive Coordinator – Tom Bettis; Linebackers – Rudy Feldman; Defensive Assistant – Chuck Banker; Special teams coaches: Special Teams – Chuck Banker; Strength and conditioning: Flexibility and Strength – Don Brown

=== Roster ===
1983 St. Louis Cardinals roster
Quarterbacks (QB): 17 Jim Hart; 16 Rusty Lisch; 15 Neil Lomax; Running backs (RB): 32 Ottis Anderson; 31 Earl Ferrell; 39 Willard Harrell; 40 Randy Love; 30 Stump Mitchell; Wide receivers (WR): 82 Steve Bird; 81 Roy Green; 85 Danny Pittman; 84 Mike Shumann; 83 Pat Tilley; Tight ends (TE): 89 Greg LaFleur; 87 Doug Marsh; 87 Eddie McGill	Offensive linemen (OL): 61 Dan Audick G; 71 Joe Bostic G; 64 Randy Clark C; 72 Dan Dierdorf C; 70 Art Plunkett T; 63 Tootie Robbins T; 56 Carlos Scott C/G; 67 Luis Sharpe T; 68 Terry Stieve G; Defensive linemen (DL): 60 Al Baker DE; 69 Rush Brown DT; 73 Mark Duda DT; 65 David Galloway DT; 75 Curtis Greer DE; 78 Elois Grooms DT; 76 Stafford Mays DT/DE	Linebackers (LB): 58 Dave Ahrens MLB; 51 Kurt Allerman MLB; 52 Charles Baker OLB; 59 Paul Davis OLB; 54 E. J. Junior OLB; 57 Chet Parlavecchio OLB; 55 Bill Whitaker OLB; Defensive backs (DB): 46 Victor Heflin CB; 47 Cedric Mack CB; 38 Lee Nelson SS; 23 Benny Perrin FS; 26 George Schmitt FS; 46 Leonard Smith SS; 44 Wayne Smith CB; 48 Lionel Washington CB; Special teams (ST): 18 Carl Birdsong P; 11 Neil O'Donoghue K	Reserve: 66 Ramsey Dardar DT (IR); 35 Jeff Griffin CB (IR); 50 Bob Harris LB (IR); 53 Craig Shaffer LB (IR); 24 Wayne Morris RB (IR); Rookies in italics

== Schedule ==
Week	Date	Opponent	Result	Record	Venue	Attendance
1	September 4	at New Orleans Saints	**L** 17–28	0–1	Louisiana Superdome	60,430
2	September 11	**Dallas Cowboys**	**L** 17–34	0–2	Busch Memorial Stadium	48,532
3	September 18	San Francisco 49ers	**L** 27–42	0–3	Busch Memorial Stadium	38,132
4	September 25	at **Philadelphia Eagles**	**W** 14–11	1–3	Veterans Stadium	64,465
5	October 2	at Kansas City Chiefs	**L** 14–38	1–4	Arrowhead Stadium	58,975
6	October 9	**Washington Redskins**	**L** 14–38	1–5	Busch Memorial Stadium	42,698
7	October 16	at Tampa Bay Buccaneers	**W** 34–27	2–5	Tampa Stadium	48,224
8	October 24	**New York Giants**	**T** 20–20	2–5–1	Busch Memorial Stadium	45,630
9	October 30	Minnesota Vikings	**W** 41–31	3–5–1	Busch Memorial Stadium	42,575
10	November 6	at **Washington Redskins**	**L** 7–45	3–6–1	RFK Stadium	51,380
11	November 13	Seattle Seahawks	**W** 33–28	4–6–1	Busch Memorial Stadium	33,280
12	November 20	San Diego Chargers	**W** 44–14	5–6–1	Busch Memorial Stadium	40,644
13	November 24	at **Dallas Cowboys**	**L** 17–35	5–7–1	Texas Stadium	60,974
14	December 4	at **New York Giants**	**W** 10–6	6–7–1	Giants Stadium	25,156
15	December 11	at Los Angeles Raiders	**W** 34–24	7–7–1	Los Angeles Memorial Coliseum	32,111
16	December 18	**Philadelphia Eagles**	**W** 31–7	8–7–1	Busch Memorial Stadium	21,902
Note: Intra-division opponents are in **bold** text.

== Standings ==
NFC East
	W	L	T	PCT	DIV	CONF	PF	PA	STK
Washington Redskins^{(1)}	14	2	0	.875	7–1	10–2	541	332	W9
Dallas Cowboys^{(4)}	12	4	0	.750	7–1	10–2	479	360	L2
St. Louis Cardinals	8	7	1	.531	3–4–1	5–6–1	374	428	W3
Philadelphia Eagles	5	11	0	.313	1–7	4–10	233	322	L2
New York Giants	3	12	1	.219	1–6–1	3–8–1	267	347	L4
