= 1978 St. Louis Cardinals (NFL) season =

American football team season

1978 St. Louis Cardinals season
- Owner: Bill Bidwill
- Head coach: Bud Wilkinson
- Home stadium: Busch Memorial Stadium

Results
- Record: 6–10
- Division place: 4th NFC East
- Playoffs: Did not qualify
- Pro Bowlers: C Tom Banks; G Bob Young; T Dan Dierdorf

The 1978 St. Louis Cardinals season was the team's 59th year with the National Football League and the 19th season in St. Louis. The controversial recruitment of 62-year-old former Oklahoma Sooners coach Bud Wilkinson was a failure, as the team, already affected by becoming the first opponent team to lose visiting the expansion Tampa Bay Buccaneers (in December 1977), failed to maintain the standard of the previous four seasons. St. Louis lost its first eight games to be out of the running for the playoffs by midseason, and even a sequence of six wins in eight games failed to move them beyond a tie for last in its division.

The last of the Cardinals’ initial eight consecutive losses was the final time they played the New York Jets until 1996, by which time the franchise was based in Phoenix and provided a notorious Jets’ team with the win needed to avoid the first 0–16 record in NFL history. The reason for this is that before the admission of the Texans in 2002, NFL scheduling formulas for games outside a team's division were much more influenced by table position during the previous season.

Wilkinson was hired in early March, following the release of Don Coryell in February. Wilkinson had last coached at Oklahoma in 1963, and had since been an analyst on college football telecasts.

== Offseason ==
=== NFL draft ===
1978 St. Louis Cardinals draft
| Round | Pick | Player | Position | College | Notes |
| 1 | 15 | Steve Little | Kicker | Arkansas | |
| 1 | 19 | Ken Greene | Safety | Washington State | |
| 2 | 42 | John Barefield | Linebacker | Texas A&I | |
| 3 | 69 | Doug Greene | Defensive back | Texas A&I | |
| 4 | 96 | George Collins | Guard | Georgia | |
| 4 | 97 | Jimmy Childs | Wide receiver | Cal Poly | |
| 5 | 124 | Earl Carr | Running back | Florida | |
| 6 | 151 | Jack Williams | Defensive end | Bowling Green | |
| 7 | 181 | Dave Stief | Wide receiver | Portland State | |
| 9 | 235 | Joe Mosley | Tight end | Central State (OH) | |
| 10 | 265 | Randy Gill | Linebacker | San Jose State | |
| 12 | 319 | Anthony Clay | Linebacker | South Carolina State | |
Made roster * Made at least one Pro Bowl during career

== Staff ==
1978 St. Louis Cardinals staff
| Front office: Owner – Bill Bidwill; Director of Operations – Joe Sullivan; Assistant Director of Operations – Larry Wilson; Head coaches: Head Coach – Bud Wilkinson; Offensive coaches: Quarterbacks/Receivers – Harry Gilmer; Offensive Backfield – Pete Elliott; Offensive Line – Jim Hanifan; Special Assistant – Buddy Parker | Defensive coaches: Defensive Coordinator – Tom Bettis; Defensive Line – Rudy Feldman; Defensive Secondary – Fred Glick; Special teams coaches: Special Teams – Jerry Thompson |

=== Roster ===
1978 St. Louis Cardinals roster
| Quarterbacks (QB): 17 Jim Hart; 18 Mark Manges; 15 Steve Pisarkiewicz; Running backs (RB): 20 Gordon Bell; 28 Ted Farmer; 39 Willard Harrell; 34 Steve Jones; 35 Jim Otis; Wide receivers (WR): 89 Warren Anderson; 85 Mel Gray; 84 Dave Stief; 83 Pat Tilley; Tight ends (TE): 87 Al Chandler; 80 Eason Ramson | Offensive linemen (OL): 54 Tom Banks C; 51 Tom Brahaney C; 66 George Collins G; 72 Dan Dierdorf T; 60 Roger Finnie T; 65 Tom Mullen G/T; 68 Terry Stieve G; 62 Keith Wortman T/G; 64 Bob Young G; Defensive linemen (DL): 79 Bob Bell DE; 73 Mike Dawson NT; 82 Bob Pollard DE; 70 Keith Simons NT; 78 Ron Yankowski DE; 63 John Zook DE | Linebackers (LB): 50 Kurt Allerman ILB; 57 Mark Arneson OLB; 56 Tim Kearney ILB; 53 Steve Neils OLB; 59 Curtis Townsend OLB; 55 Eric Williams ILB; Defensive backs (DB): 27 Carl Allen CB; 40 Doug Greene SS; 37 Ken Greene SS; 38 Lee Nelson CB; 45 Perry Smith CB; 22 Roger Wehrli CB; 44 Rolly Woolsey FS; Special teams (ST): 25 Jim Bakken K; 12 Steve Little P; 16 Mike Wood P | Reserve: 89 George Amundson TE (IR); 58 John Barefield LB (IR); 87 J. V. Cain TE (IR); 86 Jimmy Childs WR (IR); -- Anthony Clay LB (IR); 76 Charlie Davis NT (IR); -- Robert Giblin S (IR); 24 Wayne Morris RB (IR); 23 Ken Stone S (IR); 74 Jack Williams DE (IR); Rookies in italics |

== Preseason ==
| Week | Date | Opponent | Result | Record | Venue | Attendance |
|---|---|---|---|---|---|---|
| 1 | August 5 | at Miami Dolphins | L 7–28 | 0–1 | Miami Orange Bowl | 46,557 |
| 2 | August 12 | at Chicago Bears | W 26–14 | 1–1 | Soldier Field | 52,732 |
| 3 | August 19 | at Green Bay Packers | L 17–23 | 1–2 | Lambeau Field | 50,423 |
| 4 | August 26 | at Kansas City Chiefs | W 12–7 | 2–2 | Arrowhead Stadium | 40,884 |

== Regular season ==
=== Schedule ===
| Week | Date | Opponent | Result | Record | Venue | Attendance | Recap |
|---|---|---|---|---|---|---|---|
| 1 | September 3 | at Chicago Bears | **L** 10–17 | 0–1 | Soldier Field | 52,791 | Recap |
| 2 | September 10 | New England Patriots | **L** 6–16 | 0–2 | Busch Memorial Stadium | 48,233 | Recap |
| 3 | September 17 | **Washington Redskins** | **L** 10–28 | 0–3 | Busch Memorial Stadium | 49,282 | Recap |
| 4 | September 24 | at **Dallas Cowboys** | **L** 12–21 | 0–4 | Texas Stadium | 62,760 | Recap |
| 5 | October 1 | at Miami Dolphins | **L** 10–24 | 0–5 | Miami Orange Bowl | 43,882 | Recap |
| 6 | October 8 | Baltimore Colts | **L** 17–30 | 0–6 | Busch Memorial Stadium | 47,479 | Recap |
| 7 | October 15 | **Dallas Cowboys** | **L** 21–24 (OT) | 0–7 | Busch Memorial Stadium | 48,991 | Recap |
| 8 | October 22 | at New York Jets | **L** 10–23 | 0–8 | Shea Stadium | 49,244 | Recap |
| 9 | October 29 | at **Philadelphia Eagles** | **W** 16–10 | 1–8 | Veterans Stadium | 62,989 | Recap |
| 10 | November 5 | **New York Giants** | **W** 20–10 | 2–8 | Busch Memorial Stadium | 48,820 | Recap |
| 11 | November 12 | at San Francisco 49ers | **W** 16–10 | 3–8 | Candlestick Park | 33,155 | Recap |
| 12 | November 19 | at **Washington Redskins** | **W** 27–17 | 4–8 | RFK Stadium | 52,460 | Recap |
| 13 | November 26 | **Philadelphia Eagles** | **L** 10–14 | 4–9 | Busch Memorial Stadium | 39,693 | Recap |
| 14 | December 3 | Detroit Lions | **W** 21–14 | 5–9 | Busch Memorial Stadium | 39,200 | Recap |
| 15 | December 10 | at **New York Giants** | **L** 0–17 | 5–10 | Giants Stadium | 52,226 | Recap |
| 16 | December 17 | Atlanta Falcons | **W** 42–21 | 6–10 | Busch Memorial Stadium | 40,022 | Recap |
Note: Intra-division opponents are in **bold** text.

=== Standings ===
NFC East
| | W | L | T | PCT | DIV | CONF | PF | PA | STK |
|---|---|---|---|---|---|---|---|---|---|
| ^{(2)} Dallas Cowboys | 12 | 4 | 0 | .750 | 7–1 | 9–3 | 384 | 208 | W6 |
| ^{(5)} Philadelphia Eagles | 9 | 7 | 0 | .563 | 4–4 | 6–6 | 270 | 250 | W1 |
| Washington Redskins | 8 | 8 | 0 | .500 | 4–4 | 6–6 | 273 | 283 | L5 |
| St. Louis Cardinals | 6 | 10 | 0 | .375 | 3–5 | 6–6 | 248 | 296 | W1 |
| New York Giants | 6 | 10 | 0 | .375 | 2–6 | 5–9 | 264 | 298 | L1 |
