= 1984 St. Louis Cardinals (NFL) season =

American football team season

1984 St. Louis Cardinals season
- Owner: Bill Bidwill
- Head coach: Jim Hanifan
- Home stadium: Busch Stadium

Results
- Record: 9–7
- Division place: 2nd NFC East
- Playoffs: Did not qualify
- Pro Bowlers: QB Neil Lomax; WR Roy Green; LB E.J. Junior

The 1984 NFL season was the 65th year of the St. Louis Cardinals in the National Football League and their 25th season in St. Louis. Despite finishing with the same 9–7 record as their division rivals Dallas and New York, the Giants made the playoffs based upon the best head-to-head record among the three teams. (Note: (Giants: 3–1; Cardinals 2–2; Cowboys 1–3). The Cardinals had an opportunity to win the NFC East if they had beaten the Washington Redskins in their final game of the year, but a Neil O' Donahue field goal attempt at the end of the game was off target when a successful kick would have won the game and sent St. Louis to the playoffs.)

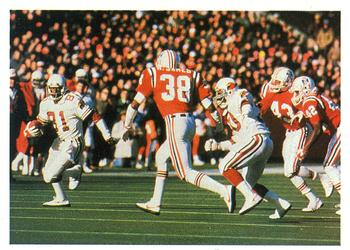
Cardinals wide receiver Roy Green rushing the ball against the Patriots during an away game in 1984.

The Cardinals’ 6,345 offensive yards in 1984 was third in the NFL, and the most in team history. Their 423 points were fourth-best in the league.

This was the Cardinals' last winning season in St. Louis. The franchise moved to Arizona in 1988, and did not enjoy a winning season there until 1998.

== Offseason ==
=== NFL draft ===
1984 St. Louis Cardinals draft
Round	Pick	Player	Position	College	Notes
1	17	Clyde Duncan	Wide receiver	Tennessee	
2	45	Doug Dawson	Guard	Texas	
3	80	Rick McIvor	Quarterback	Texas	
4	101	Martin Bayless	Defensive back	Bowling Green	
5	129	Jeff Leiding	Linebacker	Texas	
5	136	John Goode	Tight end	Youngstown State	
6	157	Rod Clark	Linebacker	Southwest Texas State	
7	185	Quentin Walker	Running back	Virginia	
8	201	Niko Noga	Linebacker	Hawaii	
8	213	Bob Paulling	Kicker	Clemson	
9	241	John Walker	Running back	Texas	
10	269	Mark Smythe	Defensive tackle	Indiana	
11	296	Kyle Mackey	Quarterback	East Texas State	
12	325	Paul Parker	Guard	Oklahoma	
Made roster * Made at least one Pro Bowl during career

== Personnel ==
=== Staff ===
1984 St. Louis Cardinals staff
Front office: President – Bill Bidwill; Director of Pro Personnel – Larry Wilson; Director of Player Personnel – George Boone; Head coaches: Head Coach – Jim Hanifan; Special Assistant to the Head Coach – Leon McLaughlin; Offensive coaches: Offensive Coordinator – Rod Dowhower; Offensive Backfield – Dick Jamieson; Receivers – Emmitt Thomas; Offensive Line – Tom Lovat	Defensive coaches: Assistant Head Coach/Defense – Floyd Peters; Defensive Coordinator – Tom Bettis; Linebackers – Rudy Feldman; Defensive Assistant – Chuck Banker; Special teams coaches: Special Teams – Chuck Banker; Strength and conditioning: Flexibility and Strength – Don Brown

=== Roster ===
1984 St. Louis Cardinals roster
Quarterbacks (QB): 15 Neil Lomax; 12 Kyle Mackey; 14 Rick McIvor; Running backs (RB): 32 Ottis Anderson; 31 Earl Ferrell; 39 Willard Harrell; 36 Perry Harrington; 40 Randy Love; 30 Stump Mitchell; Wide receivers (WR): 86 Clyde Duncan; 81 Roy Green; 85 Danny Pittman; 83 Pat Tilley; Tight ends (TE): 84 John Goode; 89 Greg LaFleur; 87 Doug Marsh	Offensive linemen (OL): 71 Joe Bostic G; 64 Randy Clark C; 66 Doug Dawson G; 70 Art Plunkett T; 63 Tootie Robbins T; 56 Carlos Scott C; 67 Luis Sharpe T; 68 Terry Stieve G; Defensive linemen (DL): 60 Al Baker DE; 62 Ramsey Dardar DT; 65 David Galloway DT; 75 Curtis Greer DE; 78 Elois Grooms DT; 76 Stafford Mays DE; 72 Dan Ralph DT	Linebackers (LB): 58 Dave Ahrens OLB; 51 Kurt Allerman MLB; 52 Charles Baker OLB; 55 Billy Davis OLB; 50 Bob Harris OLB; 59 Thomas Howard OLB; 54 E. J. Junior OLB/MLB; 57 Niko Noga MLB; Defensive backs (DB): 35 Jeff Griffin CB; 46 Victor Heflin CB; 47 Cedric Mack CB; 38 Lee Nelson FS; 23 Benny Perrin SS; 46 Leonard Smith SS; 44 Wayne Smith CB; 48 Lionel Washington CB; Special teams (ST): 18 Carl Birdsong P; 11 Neil O'Donoghue K	Reserve: 61 Dan Audick G (NF-Inj.); -- Rod Clark LB (IR); 73 Mark Duda DT (IR); 87 Eddie McGill TE (IR); 26 George Schmitt S (IR); 34 John Walker RB (IR); 33 Quentin Walker RB (IR); 42 Bill Whitaker S (IR); Rookies in italics

== Regular season ==
=== Schedule ===
Week	Date	Opponent	Result	Record	Venue	Attendance
1	September 2	at Green Bay Packers	**L** 23–24	0–1	Lambeau Field	53,738
2	September 9	Buffalo Bills	**W** 37–7	1–1	Busch Memorial Stadium	35,785
3	September 16	at Indianapolis Colts	**W** 34–33	2–1	Hoosier Dome	60,274
4	September 23	at New Orleans Saints	**L** 24–34	2–2	Louisiana Superdome	58,723
5	September 30	Miami Dolphins	**L** 28–36	2–3	Busch Memorial Stadium	46,991
6	October 7	at **Dallas Cowboys**	**W** 31–20	3–3	Texas Stadium	61,438
7	October 14	Chicago Bears	**W** 38–21	4–3	Busch Memorial Stadium	49,554
8	October 21	**Washington Redskins**	**W** 26–24	5–3	Busch Memorial Stadium	50,262
9	October 28	at **Philadelphia Eagles**	**W** 34–14	6–3	Veterans Stadium	54,310
10	November 4	Los Angeles Rams	**L** 13–16	6–4	Busch Memorial Stadium	51,010
11	November 11	**Dallas Cowboys**	**L** 17–24	6–5	Busch Memorial Stadium	48,721
12	November 18	at **New York Giants**	**L** 10–16	6–6	Giants Stadium	73,428
13	November 25	**Philadelphia Eagles**	**W** 17–16	7–6	Busch Memorial Stadium	39,858
14	December 2	at New England Patriots	**W** 33–10	8–6	Sullivan Stadium	53,558
15	December 9	**New York Giants**	**W** 31–21	9–6	Busch Memorial Stadium	49,973
16	December 16	at **Washington Redskins**	**L** 27–29	9–7	RFK Stadium	54,299
Note: Intra-division opponents are in **bold** text.

=== Standings ===
NFC East
	W	L	T	PCT	DIV	CONF	PF	PA	STK
Washington Redskins^{(2)}	11	5	0	.688	5–3	8–4	426	310	W4
New York Giants^{(5)}	9	7	0	.563	5–3	7–7	299	301	L2
St. Louis Cardinals	9	7	0	.563	5–3	6–6	423	345	L1
Dallas Cowboys	9	7	0	.563	3–5	7–5	308	308	L2
Philadelphia Eagles	6	9	1	.406	2–6	3–8–1	278	320	L1

== Awards and records ==
- Neil Lomax, led NFC, touchdown passes, 28 passes

=== Milestones ===
- Franchise led NFC in passing yards, 4,257 yards passing
- Ottis Anderson, 5th season, 1,000 rushing yards in one season, 1,174 yards
- Neil Lomax, franchise record, most passing yards in one season, 4,614 yards
- Neil Lomax, tied franchise record, most touchdown passes in one season, 28 Passes
- Neil O’Donoghue, tied franchise record, most points scored in one season, 117 Points
