= 1979 St. Louis Cardinals (NFL) season =

American football team season

1979 St. Louis Cardinals season
- Owner: Bill Bidwill
- Head coach: Bud Wilkinson; Larry Wilson (interim)
- Home stadium: Busch Memorial Stadium

Results
- Record: 5–11
- Division place: 5th NFC East
- Playoffs: Did not qualify
- Pro Bowlers: G Bob Young; RB Ottis Anderson; CB Roger Wehrli

The 1979 St. Louis Cardinals season was the franchise's 60th year with the National Football League and its 20th season in St. Louis. Bud Wilkinson would be fired in Week 13 after starting 3–10; Larry Wilson, a Pro Football Hall of Fame safety for the Cardinals from 1960 to 1972, would take over as interim head coach and lead the Cardinals to a 2–1 record to finish the season. Wilson would not return for the 1980 season but would return as vice president and General Manager nine years later when the Cardinals had moved to Phoenix.

== Offseason ==
=== NFL draft ===
1979 St. Louis Cardinals draft
Round	Pick	Player	Position	College	Notes
1	9	Ottis Anderson *	Running back	Miami (FL)	
2	35	Theotis Brown	Running back	UCLA	
2	46	Calvin Favron	Linebacker	Southeastern Louisiana	
3	64	Joe Bostic	Offensive tackle	Clemson	
4	89	Roy Green *	Defensive back	Henderson State	
5	118	Steve Henry	Defensive back	Emporia State	
5	130	Mark Bell	Wide receiver	Colorado State	
6	144	Thomas Lott	Running back	Oklahoma	
7	173	Kirk Gibson	Wide receiver	Michigan State	
8	199	Larry Miller	Linebacker	BYU	
9	228	Bob Rozier	Defensive end	California	
10	255	Jerry Holloway	Tight end	Western Illinois	
12	309	Rick McBride	Linebacker	Georgia	
Made roster * Made at least one Pro Bowl during career

== Personnel ==
=== Staff ===
1979 St. Louis Cardinals staff
Front office: Owner – Bill Bidwill; Vice President of Operations – Joe Sullivan; Director of Pro Personnel – Larry Wilson; Head coaches: Head Coach – Bud Wilkinson; Interim HC – Larry Wilson; Offensive coaches: Quarterbacks/Receivers – Harry Gilmer; Offensive Backfield – Jim Sweeney; Offensive Line – Duane Putnam; Special Assistant – Leon McLaughlin	Defensive coaches: Defensive Coordinator – Tom Bettis; Defensive Line – Rudy Feldman; Defensive Secondary – Fred Glick; Special teams coaches: Special Teams – Jerry Thompson; Strength and conditioning: Flexibility and Strength – Don Brown

=== Roster ===
1979 St. Louis Cardinals roster
Quarterbacks (QB): 17 Jim Hart; 14 Mike Loyd; 15 Steve Pisarkiewicz; Running backs (RB): 32 Ottis Anderson; 33 Theotis Brown; 40 Randy Love; 24 Wayne Morris; Wide receivers (WR): 86 Jimmy Childs; 85 Mel Gray; 84 Dave Stief; 83 Pat Tilley; Tight ends (TE): 80 Bill Murrell; 87 Richard Osborne	Offensive linemen (OL): 54 Tom Banks C; 71 Joe Bostic T; 51 Tom Brahaney C; 61 Chuck Brown C/G; 66 George Collins G; 65 Brad Oates T; 68 Terry Stieve G; 62 Keith Wortman T; 64 Bob Young G; Defensive linemen (DL): 76 Charlie Davis NT; 73 Mike Dawson DE; 82 Bob Pollard DE; 79 Jim Ramey DE; 70 Keith Simons NT; 78 Ron Yankowski DE	Linebackers (LB): 50 Kurt Allerman ILB; 57 Mark Arneson OLB; 58 John Barefield OLB; 52 Sean Clancy OLB; 59 Calvin Favron OLB; 60 Chris Garlich ILB; 53 Steve Neils OLB; 55 Eric Williams ILB; Defensive backs (DB): 27 Carl Allen CB; 25 Roy Green SS; 37 Ken Greene SS; 48 Steve Henry CB; 38 Lee Nelson CB; 45 Perry Smith CB; 23 Ken Stone FS; 22 Roger Wehrli CB; Special teams (ST): 12 Steve Little K/P	Reserve: 81 Mark Bell WR (IR); 72 Dan Dierdorf T (IR); 39 Willard Harrell RB (IR); 56 Tim Kearney LB (IR); 46 Jeff Lee WR (IR); 26 Thomas Lott RB (IR); 89 Gary Parris TE (IR); 36 Rod Phillips RB (IR); 63 John Zook DE (IR); Rookies in italics

== Preseason ==
Week	Date	Opponent	Result	Record	Venue	Attendance
1	August 2	at Houston Oilers	L 7–9	0–1	Houston Astrodome	46,252
2	August 9	Atlanta Falcons	W 42–17	1–1	Busch Memorial Stadium	39,705
3	August 18	at Kansas City Chiefs	L 3–20	1–2	Arrowhead Stadium	43,214
4	August 25	Chicago Bears	W 10–7	2–2	Busch Memorial Stadium	43,541

== Regular season ==
In his NFL debut, Ottis Anderson had 193 rushing yards.

=== Schedule ===
Week	Date	Opponent	Result	Record	Venue	Attendance	Recap
1	September 2	**Dallas Cowboys**	**L** 21–22	0–1	Busch Memorial Stadium	50,855	Recap
2	September 9	at **New York Giants**	**W** 27–14	1–1	Giants Stadium	71,370	Recap
3	September 16	Pittsburgh Steelers	**L** 21–24	1–2	Busch Memorial Stadium	50,416	Recap
4	September 23	**Washington Redskins**	**L** 7–17	1–3	Busch Memorial Stadium	50,680	Recap
5	September 30	at Los Angeles Rams	**L** 0–21	1–4	Los Angeles Memorial Coliseum	48,160	Recap
6	October 7	at Houston Oilers	**W** 24–17	2–4	Astrodome	53,043	Recap
7	October 14	**Philadelphia Eagles**	**L** 20–24	2–5	Busch Memorial Stadium	48,367	Recap
8	October 21	at **Dallas Cowboys**	**L** 13–22	2–6	Texas Stadium	64,300	Recap
9	October 28	Cleveland Browns	**L** 20–38	2–7	Busch Memorial Stadium	47,845	Recap
10	November 4	Minnesota Vikings	**W** 37–7	3–7	Busch Memorial Stadium	47,213	Recap
11	November 11	at **Washington Redskins**	**L** 28–30	3–8	RFK Stadium	50,868	Recap
12	November 18	at **Philadelphia Eagles**	**L** 13–16	3–9	Veterans Stadium	70,235	Recap
13	November 25	at Cincinnati Bengals	**L** 28–34	3–10	Riverfront Stadium	25,103	Recap
14	December 2	San Francisco 49ers	**W** 13–10	4–10	Busch Memorial Stadium	41,593	Recap
15	December 9	**New York Giants**	**W** 29–20	5–10	Busch Memorial Stadium	39,802	Recap
16	December 16	at Chicago Bears	**L** 6–42	5–11	Soldier Field	42,810	Recap
Note: Intra-division opponents are in **bold** text.

== Standings ==
NFC East
	W	L	T	PCT	DIV	CONF	PF	PA	STK
Dallas Cowboys^{(1)}	11	5	0	.688	6–2	10–2	371	313	W3
Philadelphia Eagles^{(4)}	11	5	0	.688	6–2	9–3	339	282	W1
Washington Redskins	10	6	0	.625	5–3	8–4	348	295	L1
New York Giants	6	10	0	.375	1–7	5–9	237	323	L3
St. Louis Cardinals	5	11	0	.313	2–6	4–8	307	358	L1

== Awards and records ==
- Ottis Anderson, Associated Press Offensive Rookie of the Year
