= 1976 St. Louis Cardinals (NFL) season =

American football team season

1976 St. Louis Cardinals season
- Owner: Bill Bidwill
- Head coach: Don Coryell

Results
- Record: 10–4
- Division place: 3rd NFC East
- Playoffs: Did not qualify
- Pro Bowlers: C Tom Banks; G Conrad Dobler; T Dan Dierdorf; QB Jim Hart; WR Mel Gray; CB Roger Wehrli; K Jim Bakken

The 1976 St. Louis Cardinals season was the 57th season the franchise was in the league. The team failed to improve on their previous output of 11–3, instead regressing by one win. This was the first time in three seasons the team did not qualify for the playoffs. The Cardinals finished tied with the Washington Redskins for 2nd place in the NFC East, but they lost the tiebreaker due to Washington winning both matchups during the season.

Ultimately, the Cardinals became the only NFC team to win ten games without making the playoffs under a 14-game schedule.

Notably, they took on the San Diego Chargers in a preseason game in the first NFL game to take place in Japan.

== Offseason ==
=== 1976 expansion draft ===
St. Louis Cardinals selected during the expansion draft
| Round | Overall | Name | Position | Expansion team |
|---|---|---|---|---|
| 0 | 0 | Dwayne Crump | Cornerback | Seattle Seahawks |
| 0 | 0 | Gary Keithley | Quarterback | Seattle Seahawks |
| 0 | 0 | Council Rudolph | Defensive end | Tampa Bay Buccaneers |

=== NFL draft ===
1976 St. Louis Cardinals draft
| Round | Pick | Player | Position | College | Notes |
| 1 | 22 | Mike Dawson | Defensive tackle | Arizona | |
| 3 | 65 | Brad Oates | Offensive tackle | BYU | |
| 4 | 114 | Pat Tilley * | Wide receiver | Louisiana Tech | |
| 5 | 141 | Wayne Morris | Running back | SMU | |
| 7 | 203 | Phil Rogers | Running back | Virginia Tech | |
| 8 | 233 | Randall Burks | Wide receiver | Southeastern Oklahoma State | |
| 10 | 285 | Randy Walker | Linebacker | Bethune–Cookman | |
| 11 | 315 | Marty Akins | Defensive back | Texas | |
| 13 | 369 | Greg Brewton | Defensive tackle | Michigan State | |
| 14 | 399 | Raymond Crosier | Defensive end | Abilene Christian | |
| 15 | 420 | Lee Nelson | Safety | Florida State | |
| 16 | 453 | Cecil Beaird | Wide receiver | Fisk | |
| 17 | 483 | Dan Myers | Defensive back | Georgia Tech | |
Made roster * Made at least one Pro Bowl during career

== Personnel ==
=== Staff / Coaches ===
1976 St. Louis Cardinals staff
| Front office: Principal Owner/de facto General Manager - Bill Bidwill; Director of Pro Football Operations – Joe Sullivan; Head coaches: Head Coach – Don Coryell; Offensive coaches: Offensive Backs / Receivers – Joe Gibbs; Offensive line – Jim Hanifan | Defensive coaches: Defensive Coordinator / Secondary – Ray Willsey; Defensive Line / Linebackers – Willie Zapalac; Defensive Backs = Chuck Weber; Special teams coaches: Special Assignments - Wayne Seiver; Strength and conditioning: Strength and Conditioning - Jim Curzi |

=== Roster ===
1976 St. Louis Cardinals roster
| Quarterbacks: 10 Bill Donckers; 17 Jim Hart; Running backs: 30 Gary Hammond; 34 Steve Jones; 32 Jerry Latin; 21 Terry Metcalf; 24 Wayne Morris; 27 Eddie Moss; 35 Jim Otis; Wide receivers: 86 Melvin Baker; 85 Mel Gray; 84 Ike Harris; 83 Pat Tilley; Tight ends: 88 J. V. Cain; 81 Jackie Smith | Offensive linemen: 54 Tom Banks C; 51 Tom Brahaney C/G; 72 Dan Dierdorf T; 66 Conrad Dobler G; 60 Roger Finnie T; 65 Brad Oates T; 62 Keith Wortman G; 64 Bob Young G; Defensive linemen: 79 Bob Bell DE; 70 Leo Brooks DE; 76 Charlie Davis DT; 73 Mike Dawson DT; 71 Steve Okoniewski DT; 63 John Zook DE | Linebackers: 57 Mark Arneson OLB; 58 Al Beauchamp OLB; 59 Carl Gersbach MLB; 56 Tim Kearney MLB; 52 Mike McGraw OLB; 67 Larry Stallings OLB; Defensive backs: 26 Dwayne Crump CB; 41 Clarence Duren FS; 36 Ken Reaves SS; 20 Mike Sensibaugh FS; 46 Jeff Severson SS; 43 Norm Thompson CB; 22 Roger Wehrli CB; Special teams: 25 Jim Bakken K; 87 Terry Joyce P | Reserve lists: 61 Hank Allison G/T (IR); 50 Greg Hartle LB (IR); 53 Steve Neils LB (IR); 38 Lee Nelson CB (IR); 74 Walt Patulski DE (IR); 55 Ray White LB (IR); 78 Ron Yankowski DE (IR); rookies in italics |

== Schedule ==
| Week | Date | Opponent | Result | Record | Venue | Attendance |
|---|---|---|---|---|---|---|
| 1 | September 12 | at Seattle Seahawks | **W** 30–24 | 1–0 | Kingdome | 58,441 |
| 2 | September 19 | Green Bay Packers | **W** 29–0 | 2–0 | Busch Memorial Stadium | 48,842 |
| 3 | September 26 | at San Diego Chargers | **L** 24–43 | 2–1 | San Diego Stadium | 40,212 |
| 4 | October 3 | **New York Giants** | **W** 27–21 | 3–1 | Busch Memorial Stadium | 48,039 |
| 5 | October 10 | **Philadelphia Eagles** | **W** 33–14 | 4–1 | Busch Memorial Stadium | 44,933 |
| 6 | October 17 | **Dallas Cowboys** | **W** 21–17 | 5–1 | Busch Memorial Stadium | 50,317 |
| 7 | October 25 | at **Washington Redskins** | **L** 10–20 | 5–2 | RFK Stadium | 48,325 |
| 8 | October 31 | San Francisco 49ers | **W** 23–20 | 6–2 | Busch Memorial Stadium | 50,365 |
| 9 | November 7 | at **Philadelphia Eagles** | **W** 17–14 | 7–2 | Veterans Stadium | 65,505 |
| 10 | November 14 | at Los Angeles Rams | **W** 30–28 | 8–2 | Los Angeles Memorial Coliseum | 64,698 |
| 11 | November 21 | **Washington Redskins** | **L** 10–16 | 8–3 | Busch Memorial Stadium | 49,833 |
| 12 | November 25 | at **Dallas Cowboys** | **L** 14–19 | 8–4 | Texas Stadium | 62,498 |
| 13 | December 4 | Baltimore Colts | **W** 24–17 | 9–4 | Busch Memorial Stadium | 48,282 |
| 14 | December 12 | at **New York Giants** | **W** 17–14 | 10–4 | Giants Stadium | 60,553 |
Note: Intra-division opponents are in **bold** text.

== Game summaries ==
=== Week 1: @ Seattle Seahawks ===
Week One: St. Louis Cardinals @ Seattle Seahawks – Game summary

| Quarter | 1 | 2 | 3 | 4 | Total |
|---|---|---|---|---|---|
| Cardinals | 3 | 10 | 10 | 7 | 30 |
| Seahawks | 3 | 0 | 7 | 14 | 24 |

at Kingdome, Seattle, Washington

- Date: September 12
- Game time: 1:09 pm local
- Game weather: indoors
- Game attendance: 58,441
- Referee: Tom Bell
- TV announcers (CBS): Jim Thacker and Alex Hawkins
- Gamebook

Game information

First quarter

- STL – Jim Bakken 28-yard field goal, 6:22 (STL 3–0)
- SEA – Don Bitterlich 27-yard field goal, 1:15 (Tied 3–3)

Second quarter

- STL – Ike Harris 12-yard pass from Jim Hart (Jim Bakken kick), 13:05 (STL 10–3)
- STL – Jim Bakken 22-yard field goal, 0:21 (STL 13–3)

Third quarter

- STL – Pat Tilley 27-yard pass from Jim Hart (Jim Bakken kick), 12:51 (STL 20–3)
- STL – Jim Bakken 26-yard field goal, 5:47 (STL 23–3)
- SEA – Sam McCullum 15-yard pass from Jim Zorn 3:52 (Don Bitterlich kick), (STL 23–10)

Fourth quarter

- STL – Jim Otis 1-yard run (Jim Bakken kick), 14:10 (STL 30–10)
- SEA – Sam McCullum 72-yard pass from Jim Zorn 13:50 (Don Bitterlich kick), (STL 30–17)
- SEA – Jim Zorn 8-yard run (Don Bitterlich kick), 5:09 (STL 30–24)

Top passers

- STL – Jim Hart: 15/23, 180 yds, 2 TD, 1 INT
- SEA – Jim Zorn: 17/37, 292 yds, 2 TD, 2 INT

Top rushers

- STL – Jim Otis: 27 car, 140 yds, 1 TD
- SEA – Andy Bolton: 12 car, 37 yds

Top receivers

- STL – Steve Jones: 3 rec, 59 yds
- SEA – Sam McCullum: 4 rec, 112 yds, 2 TD

Team – pass – rush – total – to

- STL – 175 – 281 – 456 – 2
- SEA – 279 – 73 – 352 – 3

This was the first game for the Seattle Seahawks, who had been assigned to the NFC West for their inaugural season and would play one game against every NFC team during the season, and the first ever event held at the Kingdome. The Cardinals jumped out to leads of 23–3 and 30–10 before holding on to beat the Seahawks 30–24.

== Standings ==
NFC East
| | W | L | T | PCT | DIV | CONF | PF | PA | STK |
|---|---|---|---|---|---|---|---|---|---|
| Dallas Cowboys^{(2)} | 11 | 3 | 0 | .786 | 6–2 | 9–3 | 296 | 194 | L1 |
| Washington Redskins^{(4)} | 10 | 4 | 0 | .714 | 6–2 | 9–3 | 291 | 217 | W4 |
| St. Louis Cardinals | 10 | 4 | 0 | .714 | 5–3 | 9–3 | 309 | 267 | W2 |
| Philadelphia Eagles | 4 | 10 | 0 | .286 | 2–6 | 4–8 | 165 | 286 | W1 |
| New York Giants | 3 | 11 | 0 | .214 | 1–7 | 3–9 | 170 | 250 | L1 |
