= 1986 St. Louis Cardinals (NFL) season =

NFL team season

1986 St. Louis Cardinals season
- Owner: Bill Bidwill
- Head coach: Gene Stallings
- Home stadium: Busch Stadium

Results
- Record: 4–11–1
- Division place: 5th NFC East
- Playoffs: Did not qualify
- Pro Bowlers: FB Ron Wolfley; PR Vai Sikahema

The 1986 St. Louis Cardinals season was the sixty-seventh season for the franchise was in the league, and the 27th and penultimate season in St. Louis. The team failed to improve on their previous output of 5–11, winning only four games. This was the fourth straight season in which the team did not reach the playoffs.

== Offseason ==
=== Draft ===
1986 St. Louis Cardinals draft
Round	Pick	Player	Position	College	Notes
1	5	Anthony Bell	Linebacker	Michigan State	
2	32	John Lee	Kicker	UCLA	
3	59	Gene Chilton	Center	Texas	
4	89	Carl Carter	Defensive back	Texas Tech	
5	116	Jeff Tupper	Defensive end	Oklahoma	
7	170	Eric Swanson	Wide receiver	Tennessee	
8	201	Ray Brown *	Guard	Arkansas State	
9	227	Kent Kafentzis	Defensive back	Hawaii	
10	254	Vai Sikahema *	Running back	BYU	
10	255	Wes Smith	Wide receiver	East Texas State	
11	281	Wayne Dillard	Linebacker	Alcorn State	
12	312	Kent Austin	Quarterback	Ole Miss	
Made roster † Pro Football Hall of Fame * Made at least one Pro Bowl during career

== Personnel ==
=== Staff ===
1986 St. Louis Cardinals staff
Front office: President – Bill Bidwill; Director of pro personnel – Larry Wilson; Director of player personnel – George Boone; Head coaches: Head coach – Gene Stallings; Offensive coaches: Offensive coordinator – Jim Shofner; Running backs – Hank Kuhlmann; Receivers – Mal Moore; Tight ends – Pete Hoener; Offensive line – Tom Bresnahan; Special Assistant/quality control – Leon McLaughlin	Defensive coaches: Defensive line – Jim Johnson; Linebackers – Joe Pascale; Defensive backs – Mel Renfro; Special teams coaches: Special teams – Marv Braden; Strength and conditioning: Strength and conditioning – LeBaron Caruthers

=== Roster ===
1986 St. Louis Cardinals roster
Quarterbacks (QB): 16 Kent Austin; 15 Neil Lomax; 18 Cliff Stoudt; Running backs (RB): 31 Earl Ferrell; 30 Stump Mitchell; 39 Broderick Sargent; 36 Vai Sikahema; 24 Ron Wolfley; Wide receivers (WR): 81 Roy Green; 87 Troy Johnson; 82 Don Holmes; 84 J. T. Smith; 86 Eric Swanson; Tight ends (TE): 89 Cap Boso; 82 Doug Marsh	Offensive linemen (OL): 62 Ray Brown G/T; 58 Gene Chilton C/G; 64 Randy Clark C; 70 Derek Kennard G; 63 Tootie Robbins T; 51 Mike Ruether C; 67 Luis Sharpe T; 61 Lance Smith T; Defensive linemen (DL): 60 Al Baker DE; 79 Bob Clasby DE; 73 Mark Duda NT; 65 David Galloway NT; 78 Van Hughes DE; 76 Stafford Mays DE	Linebackers (LB): 52 Charles Baker OLB; 55 Anthony Bell OLB; 54 E. J. Junior ILB; 59 Ron Monaco ILB; 57 Niko Noga ILB; 53 Freddie Joe Nunn OLB; Defensive backs (DB): 41 Carl Carter CB; 47 Cedric Mack CB; 45 Leonard Smith SS; 44 Wayne Smith CB; 23 Dennis Thurman FS; 48 Lionel Washington CB; 43 Lonnie Young FS; Special teams (ST): 14 Greg Cater P; 56 Rick DiBernardo LS; 11 Eric Schubert K	Reserve: 74 Scott Bergold T (IR); 71 Joe Bostic G (IR); 66 Doug Dawson G (IR); 35 Eric Drain RB (IR); 75 Curtis Greer DE (IR); 10 John Lee K (IR); -- Tim Lucas LB (Left squad); 85 Jay Novacek TE (IR); 68 Eric Pope T (IR); 83 Pat Tilley WR (IR); Rookies in italics

== Schedule ==
Week	Date	Opponent	Result	Record	Venue	Attendance
1	September 7	Los Angeles Rams	**L** 10–16	0–1	Busch Memorial Stadium	40,347
2	September 14	at Atlanta Falcons	**L** 13–33	0–2	Atlanta–Fulton County Stadium	46,463
3	September 21	at Buffalo Bills	**L** 10–17	0–3	Rich Stadium	65,762
4	September 29	**Dallas Cowboys**	**L** 7–31	0–4	Busch Memorial Stadium	49,077
5	October 5	**New York Giants**	**L** 6–13	0–5	Busch Memorial Stadium	40,562
6	October 12	at Tampa Bay Buccaneers	**W** 30–19	1–5	Tampa Stadium	33,307
7	October 19	at **Washington Redskins**	**L** 21–28	1–6	RFK Stadium	53,494
8	October 26	at **Dallas Cowboys**	**L** 6–37	1–7	Texas Stadium	60,756
9	November 2	**Philadelphia Eagles**	**W** 13–10	2–7	Busch Memorial Stadium	33,051
10	November 9	at San Francisco 49ers	**L** 17–43	2–8	Candlestick Park	59,172
11	November 16	New Orleans Saints	**L** 7–16	2–9	Busch Memorial Stadium	32,069
12	November 23	Kansas City Chiefs	**W** 23–14	3–9	Busch Memorial Stadium	29,680
13	November 30	**Washington Redskins**	**L** 17–20	3–10	Busch Memorial Stadium	35,637
14	December 7	at **Philadelphia Eagles**	**T** 10–10	3–10–1	Veterans Stadium	50,148
15	December 14	at **New York Giants**	**L** 7–27	3–11–1	Giants Stadium	75,261
16	December 21	Tampa Bay Buccaneers	**W** 21–17	4–11–1	Busch Memorial Stadium	23,957
Note: Intra-division opponents are in **bold** text.

== Standings ==
NFC East
	W	L	T	PCT	DIV	CONF	PF	PA	STK
^{(1)} New York Giants	14	2	0	.875	7–1	11–1	371	236	W9
^{(4)} Washington Redskins	12	4	0	.750	5–3	9–3	368	296	W1
Dallas Cowboys	7	9	0	.438	5–3	6–6	346	337	L5
Philadelphia Eagles	5	10	1	.344	1–6–1	3–8–1	256	312	L1
St. Louis Cardinals	4	11	1	.281	1–6–1	3–10–1	218	351	W1

== Awards and honors ==
- Ron Wolfley, Pro Bowl selection
