= Roy Green =

American football player (born 1957)

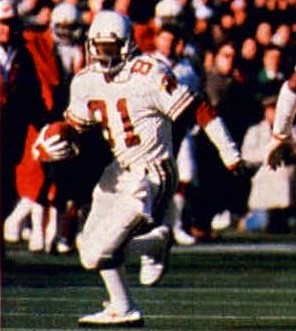
- Green with the St. Louis Cardinals in 1984

No. 25, 81
- Position: Wide receiver

Personal information
- Born: June 30, 1957 (age 69); Magnolia, Arkansas, U.S.
- Listed height: 6 ft 0 in (1.83 m)
- Listed weight: 195 lb (88 kg)

Career information
- High school: Magnolia
- College: Henderson State (1975–1978)
- NFL draft: 1979: 4th round, 89th overall pick

Career history
- St. Louis / Phoenix Cardinals (1979–1990); Philadelphia Eagles (1991–1992)

Awards and highlights
- 2× First-team All-Pro (1983, 1984); 2× Pro Bowl (1983, 1984); NFL receiving yards leader (1984); NFL receiving touchdowns leader (1983); Arizona Cardinals Ring of Honor

Career NFL statistics
- Receptions: 559
- Receiving yards: 8,965
- Receiving touchdowns: 66
- Stats at Pro Football Reference

Roy Calvin Green (born June 30, 1957), nicknamed "Jet Stream", is an American former professional football player who was a wide receiver in the National Football League (NFL). He played college football for the Henderson State Reddies. Green played in the NFL for the St. Louis / Phoenix Cardinals, where he played his first three seasons as a safety. He finished his career with the Philadelphia Eagles from 1991 to 1992.

== Early life ==
Green was born on June 30, 1957, in Magnolia, Arkansas. He attended Magnolia High School, and participated on the football, basketball and track teams every year. As a football star, he played split end and defensive back, while also returning punts and kickoffs. He also was a kicker. Green played on the state Class AA football championship team his senior year in 1974. In his senior year, he also was selected to the All-District and All-State football teams, and to the Arkansas Gazette Super Dream Team.

In 2019, Magnolia High School retired Green's number 25.

== College career ==
Green played college football at Henderson State University, in the Arkansas Intercollegiate Conference (AIC) from 1975 to 1978; and served as a team captain in 1978. The team won two AIC championships during his tenure.

Green played defensive back and returned kicks. He was named All-AIC from 1976 to 1978, and National Association of Intercollegiate Athletics (NAIA) All-District in 1978. He gained NAIA All-American honorable mention in 1977, and was an NAIA All-American in 1978. Green led the AIC in interceptions and punt returns in 1978.

In a November 4, 1978 game against the University of Arkansas at Monticello, Green scored three touchdowns, none on the offense. He scored on a 90-yard kickoff return, a 65-yard punt return, and a 40-yard interception return. He also blocked a field goal attempt in the game.

At Henderson, his nickname was "the Green Machine", but as a professional player he would come to be called "Jet Stream".

== Professional career ==
Green was drafted 89th overall by the Cardinals in the fourth round of the 1979 NFL draft, as a strong safety and kick returner. In 1979, he was primarily a kick returner, but also returned punts and was the back-up strong safety. He starred as a rookie returning kicks, including a 106-yard return for a touchdown against the Dallas Cowboys, tying an NFL record at the time. (As of 2024, the record is 109 yards, set by Cordarrelle Patterson in 2013.) He did catch one pass in 1979, but none in 1980. In 1980, he started six games at free safety, with one interception, while returning kicks and averaging 10.5 yards per punt return, with one return for a touchdown. Green also played well at cornerback.

In 1981, Green was a two-way player. He stepped in as wide receiver part-time and managed to gain 708 yards on merely 33 catches, which equated to nearly 21.5 yards per catch. On September 20 against the Washington Redskins, he caught a 58-yard touchdown pass and recorded an interception in the same game. This made him the first player since Washington's Ed Sutton on December 8, 1957, playing both running back and defensive back, to do both in the same game. Green did this twice more that year against the Dallas Cowboys and Washington. The following season, Green fully transitioned to wide receiver and performed well in the strike-shortened season. Altogether he played 1½ two-way seasons, and during some of that time was also returning punts and kickoffs. While a normal player might participate in as many as 60-70 plays a game, in 1981, Green participated in 108 plays in just a single game by playing on offense, defense and four special teams.

Green truly shined during the next several seasons, particularly in 1984 when his 1,555 receiving yards led the league, and were then the third highest in a season (through the 2005 season; this has since dropped to fortieth as of 2024). In 1983, he led the league with 14 receiving touchdowns. Green led the Cardinals in receiving in 1983 (78 receptions/1,227 yards), 1984 (78 receptions/1,555 yards) and 1988 (68 receptions/1,097 yards; during those intervening years, veterans Pat Tilley and J. T. Smith split time leading the team in receiving). Green was selected first-team All-Pro in 1983 and 1984 and was also chosen to play in the Pro Bowl both years.

Early in the 1985 season, New York Giant's Hall of Fame coach Bill Parcells said of Green,"’There is nobody in the National Football League who can cover him one-on-one .... 'It's suicide to try. He's got a good grasp of what's going on in the secondary, but the big thing is that he has rare athletic ability and great determination.''' It was his years of playing in the defensive secondary that gave him a heightened understanding of reading a defense. Injuries suffered in the next few years, however, kept him from returning to the 1983-84 peak levels of performance. He was usually one of the few stars on a mediocre team. During his career, the Cardinals only made the playoffs once, in the strike-shortened 1982 season, and would only garner winning records two other times.

Green played with the Cardinals past their move to Phoenix, Arizona in 1987. He caught 68 passes in 1988 for 1,097 yards with seven touchdowns for his third and final 1,000-yard season. The following year saw him play in just twelve games and catch 44 passes for 703 yards with seven touchdowns. Green caught 53 passes in the 1990 season that got him to 500 career receptions, which as of the end of that season saw just 24 other players with as many receptions. On June 9, 1991, he was traded to the Cleveland Browns for an undisclosed draft pick. On August 20, 1991, he was cut from the team when the Browns reduced their roster to sixty and elected to keep rookie Michael Jackson and Reggie Langhorne instead.

Green was subsequently signed by the Philadelphia Eagles in September 1991, who sought veteran leadership at wide receiver to replace the retired Mike Quick and the waived Cris Carter. Green played much of that season, in which a lackluster offense (after star quarterback Randall Cunningham suffered a season-ending knee injury in the season's first game) was balanced by a sensational defense that has been ranked among the greatest defenses in NFL history. In an early season game against the Pittsburgh Steelers, after being with the team for only four days, Green caught six passes for 114 yards. Green played sparingly the following season and retired in 1993.

John Madden honored Green in his annual All-Madden Team, stating that at one point he regarded Green as not the best wide receiver in the game, but the best player. Green finished with 559 receptions for 8,965 yards and 66 touchdowns. He also rushed for 140 yards, returned 27 punts for 230 yards, and added another 2,002 yards on kickoff returns. He also intercepted 4 passes for 54 yards and recovered 20 fumbles. Overall, he gained 11,391 total yards and scored 69 touchdowns, with his 66 receiving touchdowns and 69 total touchdowns for the Cardinals being franchise records until broken by Larry Fitzgerald (who is considered the greatest Cardinal receiver).

On October 2, 2016, Green was inducted as the 16th member of the Arizona Cardinals Ring of Honor. On September 15, 2017, Green was inducted into the St. Louis Sports Hall of Fame.

== Honors and awards ==
Green has received the following awards and honors, among others;

- In 1983-1984, Green was selected First-Team All Pro and to the Pro Bowl
- In 1997, Green was inducted into the Henderson State University Athletics Hall of Fame
- In 2001, Green was inducted into the Arkansas Sports Hall of Fame
- In 2016, Green was inducted into the Arizona Cardinals Ring of Honor
- In 2017, Green was inducted into the St. Louis Sports Hall of Fame
- In 2019, Magnolia High School retired Green's number 25

== NFL career statistics ==
Legend
	Led the league
**Bold**	Career high

=== Regular season ===
Year	Team	Games		Receiving				
Year	Team	GP	GS	Rec	Yds	Avg	Lng	TD
1979	STL	**16**	0	1	15	15.0	15	0
1980	STL	15	6	0	0	0.0	0	0
1981	STL	**16**	2	33	708	**21.5**	60	4
1982	STL	9	9	32	453	14.2	42	3
1983	STL	**16**	15	**78**	1,227	15.7	71	**14**
1984	STL	**16**	**16**	**78**	**1,555**	19.9	**83**	12
1985	STL	13	13	50	693	13.9	47	5
1986	STL	11	10	42	517	12.3	48	6
1987	STL	12	12	43	731	17.0	57	4
1988	PHO	**16**	**16**	68	1,097	16.1	52	7
1989	PHO	12	12	44	703	16.0	59	7
1990	PHO	**16**	**16**	53	797	15.0	54	4
1991	PHI	13	3	29	364	12.6	42	0
1992	PHI	9	0	8	105	13.1	21	0
Career		190	130	559	8,965	16.0	83	66

=== Playoffs ===
Year	Team	Games		Receiving				
Year	Team	GP	GS	Rec	Yds	Avg	Lng	TD
1982	STL	1	**1**	**9**	**113**	12.6	**29**	0
1992	PHI	**2**	0	1	14	**14.0**	14	0
Career		3	1	10	127	12.7	29	0

== Personal life ==
Green married his wife, Sharon, before the 1980 NFL season. Ottis Anderson and Theotis Brown served as groomsmen and his brother, Leotis, was best man.

After retirement, he worked as part of the Arizona Cardinals broadcast team.

Since retiring from the NFL, Green has shifted his focus to helping improve the health of current and former professional athletes through promoting sleep apnea awareness across the country. He has teamed up with dental icon, David Gergen, and a company called Pro Player Health Alliance to hold free public awareness events in local communities all over the nation. After joining the cause of Pro Player Health Alliance and using his extensive number of connections to players, as of 2016, he has helped get over 1,600 former players successfully treated for sleep apnea.

In 2012, Green was diagnosed with kidney disease due to the long-term use of anti-inflammatories during his playing career in the NFL. Following a year of dialysis three days a week, his daughters, Miyosha, 30, and Candace, 26, both offered to donate a kidney to their father. Both daughters were matches, but Miyosha was chosen to donate. Green had successful surgery on November 14 at the Mayo Clinic. He was one of eight named plaintiffs in a class action suit against the league alleging reckless distribution of narcotic painkillers that went on for nearly a decade.
