= Mel Gray (wide receiver) =

American football player (born 1948)

No. 85
- Position: Wide receiver

Personal information
- Born: September 29, 1948 (age 78); Fresno, California, U.S.
- Listed height: 5 ft 9 in (1.75 m)
- Listed weight: 172 lb (78 kg)

Career information
- High school: Montgomery (Santa Rosa, California)
- College: Missouri
- NFL draft: 1971: 6th round, 147th overall pick

Career history
- St. Louis Cardinals (1971–1982); Los Angeles Express (1983); Oklahoma / Arizona Outlaws (1984–1985)

Awards and highlights
- First-team All-Pro (1975); 4× Pro Bowl (1974–1977); NFL receiving touchdowns co-leader (1975); First-team All-Big Eight (1969)

Career NFL statistics
- Receptions: 351
- Receiving yards: 6,644
- Total TDs: 46
- Stats at Pro Football Reference

Melvin Dean Gray (born September 29, 1948) is an American former professional football player who was a wide receiver for the St. Louis Cardinals of the National Football League (NFL) from 1971 to 1982. He attended college at the University of Missouri.

== Early life ==
Gray attended Montgomery High School in Santa Rosa, California, the football standout was also a track and field star. While winning the 100-yard dash at the 1967 CIF California State Meet, Gray set not only the meet record but the National High School record of 9.4 in the event at the time. His meet record lasted until 1979.

== College career ==
He accepted a scholarship to the University of Missouri and became a football and track and field star. Gray was an All-American sprinter and was a Grand Slam winner in the 100-meter dash in 1970, capturing titles at the Texas, Kansas, and Drake relays. Gray was a five-time Big Eight Conference sprint champion, winning the indoor 60-yard dash (1970), and the 100- and 220-yard dashes outdoors in 1969 and 1970. He is the co-holder of the MU records in all three races, with times of 6.0 seconds, 9.2 seconds, and 20.3 seconds, respectively. Gray was also an all-Big Eight performer in 1969 when he caught 25 passes for 705 yards and a school-record nine touchdowns. He held the school record for career receiving yards (1,491) for 20 years and was named to the Mizzou All-Century Team in 1990.

== Professional career ==
In the 1971 NFL draft, Gray was a sixth-round pick of the St. Louis Cardinals. He was selected to four straight Pro Bowls (1974–1977). Gray was one of the most feared deep threats in the NFL throughout the 1970s. Twenty-eight of his forty-six career touchdown receptions were more than 40 yards long. He was the league co-leader in touchdown receptions in 1975 and averaged almost 19 yards per catch during his career. Gray also caught passes in 121 consecutive games between 1973 and 1982.

== NFL career statistics ==
Legend
	Led the league
**Bold**	Career high

=== Regular season ===
Year	Team	Games		Receiving				
Year	Team	GP	GS	Rec	Yds	Avg	Lng	TD
1971	STL	14	5	18	534	**29.7**	**80**	4
1972	STL	7	1	3	62	20.7	33	0
1973	STL	12	9	29	513	17.7	**80**	7
1974	STL	14	14	39	770	19.7	**80**	6
1975	STL	14	14	**48**	**926**	19.3	74	**11**
1976	STL	11	11	36	686	19.1	77	5
1977	STL	14	14	38	782	20.6	69	5
1978	STL	13	12	44	871	19.8	74	1
1979	STL	13	13	25	447	17.9	78	1
1980	STL	**16**	**16**	40	709	17.7	69	3
1981	STL	12	12	27	310	11.5	41	2
1982	STL	5	0	4	34	8.5	13	0
		145	121	351	6,644	18.9	80	45

=== Playoffs ===
Year	Team	Games		Receiving				
Year	Team	GP	GS	Rec	Yds	Avg	Lng	TD
1974	STL	**1**	**1**	**5**	**77**	15.4	**29**	0
1975	STL	**1**	**1**	3	52	**17.3**	23	**1**
		2	2	8	129	16.1	29	1

== Awards ==
Gray is a member of the University of Missouri Hall of Fame, the St. Louis Sports Hall of Fame, and the Missouri Sports Hall of Fame.
