= Neil Lomax =

American football player (born 1959)

No. 15
- Position: Quarterback

Personal information
- Born: February 17, 1959 (age 67); Portland, Oregon, U.S.
- Listed height: 6 ft 3 in (1.91 m)
- Listed weight: 215 lb (98 kg)

Career information
- High school: Lake Oswego (Lake Oswego, Oregon)
- College: Portland State
- NFL draft: 1981: 2nd round, 33rd overall pick

Career history

Playing
- St. Louis/Phoenix Cardinals (1981–1989)

Coaching
- Lake Oswego HS (OR) (1998–2005) Assistant coach; Tigard HS (OR) (2006) Offensive coordinator; Roosevelt HS (OR) (2008–2014) Assistant head coach & offensive coordinator; Century HS (OR) (2017) Assistant coach; Fort Vancouver HS (WA) (2018–2020) Head coach; Cleveland HS (OR) (2021) Assistant coach; George Fox (2021–2024) Quarterbacks coach

Awards and highlights
- 2× Pro Bowl (1984, 1987); NFL passing yards leader (1987); PFWA All-Rookie Team (1981); First-team I-AA All-American (1980); Portland State Vikings No. 11 retired

Career NFL statistics
- Passing attempts: 3,153
- Passing completions: 1,817
- Completion percentage: 57.6%
- TD–INT: 136–90
- Passing yards: 22,771
- Passer rating: 82.7
- Rushing yards: 969
- Rushing touchdowns: 10
- Stats at Pro Football Reference
- College Football Hall of Fame

Neil Vincent Lomax (born February 17, 1959) is an American former professional football player who was a quarterback in the National Football League (NFL), playing his entire career for the St. Louis / Phoenix Cardinals. He played college football for the Portland State Vikings, setting numerous National Collegiate Athletic Association (NCAA) passing records running head coach Mouse Davis's run and shoot offense. Lomax was inducted into the College Football Hall of Fame in 1996.

== College career ==
From Lake Oswego, Oregon, a suburb south of Portland, Lomax was a standout college football player at Portland State University, going from fifth-string freshman quarterback in 1977 on a partial scholarship to emergency starter to NCAA legend in the run and shoot offense of head coach Mouse Davis. By the end of his college career in 1980, he held 90 NCAA records, including seven touchdown passes in the first quarter against Delaware State, which ended in a 105–0 shutout for the Division I-AA Vikings. Two weeks earlier, independent Portland State crushed Division II Cal Poly Pomona 93–7. In his final collegiate game, Lomax threw for 474 yards with five touchdown passes as PSU waxed Weber State 75–0 to finish at 8–3; he ended his college career with more than 13,200 yards (7.5 miles) passing and over a hundred touchdown passes.

Lomax also had a game at Division II Northern Colorado in 1979 where he was 44/77 for 499 yards passing. As of 2012, that game ranks fourth all-time at Portland State for yards thrown in a game. He graduated with a degree in communications in 1981. He was inducted into the Portland State Athletics Hall of Fame in 1997 and had his #11 retired by the university.

== Professional career ==
Lomax was selected by the St. Louis Cardinals in the second round of the 1981 NFL draft, the 33rd overall pick. He played nine seasons with the Cardinals and was elected to the Pro Bowl following the 1984 and 1987 campaigns.

=== 1981 season ===
Lomax entered his rookie season as backup to the 15-year veteran Jim Hart. A knee injury to Hart in Week 1 led to immediate playing time for Lomax. He started Week 2, going 14-for-41 for 295 yards, with one touchdown and two interceptions in a 30–17 loss to the Dallas Cowboys. After the Cardinals struggled to a 3–7 record, Lomax was installed as the starter for the last six games of the season. Lomax led the Cardinals to four straight victories, bringing the Cardinals back to 7–7, before two losses to end the season. For the year, Lomax was 119-of-236 (50.4%) for 1,575 yards while throwing four touchdowns against ten interceptions.

=== 1982 season ===
In the strike-shortened nine-game season of 1982, Lomax started every game, passing for 1,367 yards for five touchdowns and six interceptions while having a 53.2 completion percentage. Lomax started the playoff game that the Cardinals had against the Green Bay Packers, throwing 32-of-51 for 385 yards, two touchdowns and two interceptions, but the Cardinals lost 41–16. It was his only playoff appearance.

=== 1983 season ===
Lomax suffered a shoulder injury in the season opener and did not play in the next three games. He went 7–5–1 while throwing for 2,636 yards with 24 touchdowns and 11 interceptions for a 59.0% completion percentage, but the team failed to return to the postseason, finishing 8–7–1 after starting the season 1–5.

=== 1984 season ===
On January 3, 1984, the Cardinals released Jim Hart and Lomax became the permanent starter, starting in every game, and he had his best season yet, throwing for 4,614 yards, 28 touchdowns, and 16 interceptions on a 61.6% completion percentage, all career highs. His passing yards rank 20th all-time for a season. He was named to the Pro Bowl that year. Although the Cardinals finished 9–7, the head-to-head record with the New York Giants and the Dallas Cowboys (for which the Cardinals went a combined 2–2, along with losing the season finale against the Washington Redskins) meant that St. Louis lost out on a playoff spot.

=== 1985 season ===
Lomax started in each game again in 1985, but the team went 5–11, as he threw for 18 touchdowns and 12 interceptions on 3,214 yards and a 56.3% completion percentage.

=== 1986 season ===
For 1986, Lomax started 14 games while Cliff Stoudt started the other two, with the former going 4–9–1 over the latter's 0–2 record. He threw for 2,583 yards while having 13 touchdowns and 12 interceptions on a 57.0% completion percentage.

=== 1987 season ===
The 1987 season was both Lomax's penultimate year as a Cardinal and the final year for the team in St. Louis. The 1987 NFL season was marred by a players strike which cancelled Week 3 and which featured replacement players for Weeks 4 – 6. He started in 12 games, with Shawn Halloran (who started two games and went 1–1) and Sammy Garza (who started one game, losing it) performing quarterback duties for the replacement team games. Lomax went 6–6 while throwing for 3,387 yards with 24 touchdowns and 12 interceptions for a 59.4% completion percentage. He was named to the Pro Bowl that year.

=== 1988 season ===
In his final year in 1988, the Cardinals' first in Arizona, Lomax started 14 games (while Cliff Stoudt started two others) and went 7–7, throwing for 20 touchdowns and 11 interceptions for 3,395 yards and a 57.6 completion percentage.

=== Retirement ===
Lomax did not play a snap for the Cardinals in the 1989 season due to a severely arthritic hip. At seasons end, he announced his retirement in January 1990. In 1991, he underwent hip replacement surgery. Lomax finished with a team record of 47–51–2. In his career, he completed 1,818 passes in 3,153 attempts for 22,771 yards and 136 touchdowns in 108 games. Lomax's statistics place him second behind Jim Hart in almost all measurable categories for Cardinal quarterbacks.

== Career statistics ==
Legend
	Led the league
**Bold**	Career high

=== NFL ===
==== Regular season ====
Year	Team	Games			Passing									Rushing				
Year	Team	GP	GS	Record	Cmp	Att	Pct	Yds	Avg	TD	Int	Lng	Rtg	Att	Yds	Avg	Lng	TD
1981	STL	14	7	4–3	119	236	50.4	1,575	6.7	4	10	75	59.9	19	104	**5.5**	22	2
1982	STL	9	9	5–4	109	205	53.2	1,367	6.7	5	6	42	70.1	28	119	4.3	19	1
1983	STL	13	13	7–5–1	209	354	59.0	2,636	7.4	24	11	71	92.0	27	127	4.7	**35**	2
1984	STL	16	16	**9–7**	**345**	**560**	**61.6**	**4,614**	**8.2**	**28**	**16**	83	**92.5**	**35**	**184**	5.3	20	**3**
1985	STL	16	16	5–11	265	471	56.3	3,214	6.8	18	12	47	79.5	32	125	3.9	23	0
1986	STL	14	14	4–9–1	240	421	57.0	2,583	6.1	13	12	48	73.6	**35**	148	4.2	18	1
1987	STL	12	12	6–6	275	463	59.4	3,387	7.3	24	12	57	88.5	29	107	3.7	19	0
1988	PHX	14	14	7–7	255	443	57.6	3,395	7.7	20	11	**93**	86.7	17	55	3.2	13	1
1989	PHX	Did not play due to injury																
Career		108	101	47–52–2	1,817	3,153	57.6	22,771	7.2	136	90	93	82.7	222	969	4.4	35	10

==== Postseason ====
Year	Team	Games			Passing									Rushing				
Year	Team	GP	GS	Record	Cmp	Att	Pct	Yds	Avg	TD	Int	Lng	Rtg	Att	Yds	Avg	Lng	TD
1982	STL	1	1	0–1	32	51	62.7	385	7.5	2	2	36	82.6	4	9	2.3	6	0
Career		1	1	0–1	32	51	62.7	385	7.5	2	2	36	82.6	4	9	2.3	6	0

=== College ===
Season	Team	Passing						
Season	Team	Cmp	Att	Pct	Yds	Y/A	TD	Int
1977	Portland State	102	181	56.4	1,670	**9.2**	18	**5**
1978	Portland State	241	436	55.3	3,506	8.0	26	22
1979	Portland State	**299**	**516**	58.0	3,950	7.7	26	16
1980	Portland State	296	473	**62.6**	**4,094**	8.7	**37**	12
Career		938	1,606	58.4	13,220	8.2	107	55

== After football ==
Lomax was the head coach for Fort Vancouver High School in Vancouver, Washington for two seasons before resigning in January 2020. He resigned as his commute from Wilsonville, Oregon was too much. He was the quarterbacks coach at George Fox University from 2021 to 2024.
