= Wayne Morris (American football) =

American football player (born 1954)

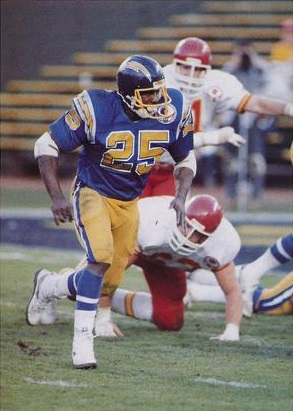
- Morris with the San Diego Chargers in 1984

No. 24, 25
- Position: Running back

Personal information
- Born: May 3, 1954 (age 72); Dallas, Texas, U.S.
- Listed height: 6 ft 0 in (1.83 m)
- Listed weight: 207 lb (94 kg)

Career information
- High school: South Oak Cliff (TX)
- College: SMU
- NFL draft: 1976: 5th round, 141st overall pick

Career history
- St. Louis Cardinals (1976–1983); San Diego Chargers (1984)

Awards and highlights
- 2× Second-team All-SWC (1972, 1975)

Career NFL statistics
- Rushing attempts: 899
- Rushing yards: 3,387
- Total TDs: 43
- Stats at Pro Football Reference

Wayne Lee Morris (born May 3, 1954) is an American former professional football player who was a running back in the National Football League (NFL). He played college football for the SMU Mustangs.

== Early life ==
Morris was born and raised in Dallas, Texas. In 1972, Morris graduated from South Oak Cliff High School (SOC), where he starred at defensive back and running back. A 1981 D Magazine article chose Morris as one of the best football players to ever come out of a Dallas high school. As the article asserted, "When Wayne Morris was at SOC in the early Seventies, he was the best all-around high school football player in Texas. As a junior he made second-team all-state on defense; as a senior he made first-team all-state on offense."

== College football ==
In college, Morris was a freshman starter at Southern Methodist University, where he starred at running back. As Dan Jenkins wrote in Sports Illustrated during Morris's freshman year, "Wayne Morris is already being pronounced the greatest thing to come to the school (SMU) since Doak Walker." Morris went on to rush for over 3000 yards during his college career.

== Professional football ==
Morris was selected in the fifth round of the 1976 NFL Draft by the Cardinals. He also played for the Chargers during his 8 years in the NFL. During his NFL career, Morris ran for 3,387 yards on 899 attempts, scoring 38 rushing touchdowns. He also caught 156 passes for 1,190 yards and 5 receiving touchdowns.

== NFL career statistics ==
Legend
**Bold**	Career high

=== Regular season ===
Year	Team	Games		Rushing					Receiving				
Year	Team	GP	GS	Att	Yds	Avg	Lng	TD	Rec	Yds	Avg	Lng	TD
1976	STL	14	1	64	292	**4.6**	27	3	8	75	**9.4**	19	**1**
1977	STL	12	7	165	**661**	4.0	**35**	**8**	24	222	9.3	**34**	**1**
1978	STL	13	13	**174**	631	3.6	27	1	33	**298**	9.0	33	**1**
1979	STL	15	15	106	387	3.7	16	**8**	**35**	237	6.8	20	**1**
1980	STL	**16**	**16**	117	456	3.9	24	6	15	110	7.3	24	**1**
1981	STL	**16**	13	109	417	3.8	14	5	19	165	8.7	21	0
1982	STL	9	7	84	274	3.3	11	4	3	8	2.7	11	0
1983	STL	15	11	75	257	3.4	17	2	14	55	3.9	11	0
1984	SDG	10	3	5	12	2.4	5	1	5	20	4.0	9	0
		120	86	899	3,387	3.8	35	38	156	1,190	7.6	34	5

=== Playoffs ===
Year	Team	Games		Rushing					Receiving				
Year	Team	GP	GS	Att	Yds	Avg	Lng	TD	Rec	Yds	Avg	Lng	TD
1982	STL	**1**	**1**	**3**	**14**	**4.7**	**8**	0	**3**	**32**	**10.7**	**15**	0
		1	1	3	14	4.7	8	0	3	32	10.7	15	0

== After football ==
He currently resides in Dallas and is single and has one daughter.
