= 1980 Delaware State vs. Portland State football game =

| Delaware State Hornets | Portland State Vikings |
| (1–7) | (5–3) |
| MEAC | Independent |
| 0 | 105 |
| Head coach: Charles Henderson | Head coach: Mouse Davis |
| | 1 | 2 | 3 | 4 | Total |
|---|---|---|---|---|---|
| Delaware State | 0 | 0 | 0 | 0 | 0 |
| Portland State | 49 | 14 | 35 | 7 | 105 |
- Date: November 8, 1980
- Season: 1980
- Stadium: Civic Stadium
- Location: Portland, Oregon
- Attendance: 4,772

The 1980 Delaware State vs. Portland State football game was played on November 8, 1980, during the 1980 NCAA Division I-AA football season at Civic Stadium in Portland, Oregon. By winning 105–0, the Vikings set the single-game record for most points scored by a team at the NCAA Division I Football Championship Subdivision (FCS)—then known as NCAA Division I-AA—level, which still stands today.

== Game summary ==
Delaware State fumbled the ball 16 times, setting the NCAA Division I-AA record. The Vikings recovered 6 of them, which helped them score 105 points. The Vikings were up 49–0 at the end of the first quarter, which is the FCS record for the most points scored by a team in the first quarter. Their scoring slowed in the second quarter, but still led 63–0 at halftime. They tacked on 35 more points in the third quarter and seven in the fourth to break the century mark. After the game, Mouse Davis said "Obviously they (Delaware State) weren't prepared. I still say they have a lot of talented football players, and I was betting the talent would make it closer. But I'll tell you this. We're going to go out there and play. I don't teach kids to lay down." Fred Nordgren became the first Portland State football player to record four sacks in a game, compiling 11 total tackles, six tackles for loss, and three fumble recoveries.

=== Scoring summary ===
Scoring summary

| Quarter | Time | Drive | | | Team | Scoring information | Score | |
| Quarter | Time | Plays | Yards | TOP | Team | Scoring information | DSU | PSU |
|---|---|---|---|---|---|---|---|---|
| 1 | 13:39 | | | | PSU | Kenny Johnson 12-yard touchdown reception from Neil Lomax, John Kincheloe kick good | 0 | 7 |
| 1 | 11:52 | | | | PSU | Dave Simantel 44-yard touchdown reception from Neil Lomax, John Kincheloe kick good | 0 | 14 |
| 1 | 10:21 | | | | PSU | Kenny Johnson 27-yard touchdown reception from Neil Lomax, John Kincheloe kick good | 0 | 21 |
| 1 | 10:09 | | | | PSU | Dave Simantel 21-yard touchdown reception from Neil Lomax, John Kincheloe kick good | 0 | 28 |
| 1 | 7:42 | | | | PSU | Kenny Johnson 60-yard touchdown reception from Neil Lomax, John Kincheloe kick good | 0 | 35 |
| 1 | 2:13 | | | | PSU | Clint Didier 7-yard touchdown reception from Neil Lomax, John Kincheloe kick good | 0 | 42 |
| 1 | 1:46 | | | | PSU | Kenny Johnson 16-yard touchdown reception from Neil Lomax, John Kincheloe kick good | 0 | 49 |
| 2 | 10:19 | | | | PSU | 2-yard touchdown run, John Kincheloe kick good | 0 | 56 |
| 2 | 7:08 | | | | PSU | Lance McDougald 10-yard touchdown reception from Lloyd LaFrance, John Kincheloe kick good | 0 | 63 |
| 3 | 10:40 | | | | PSU | Joel Frederick 1-yard touchdown run, John Kincheloe kick good | 0 | 70 |
| 3 | 8:19 | | | | PSU | Neil Lomax 13-yard touchdown run, John Kincheloe kick good | 0 | 77 |
| 2 | 6:56 | | | | PSU | Clint Didier 15-yard touchdown reception from Neil Lomax, John Kincheloe kick good | 0 | 84 |
| 3 | 3:18 | | | | PSU | Fumble recovery returned yards for touchdown by Mark Peterson, John Kincheloe kick good | 0 | 91 |
| 3 | 1:12 | | | | PSU | Lance McDougald 3-yard touchdown run, John Kincheloe kick good | 0 | 98 |
| 4 | 9:01 | | | | PSU | Jeff Rudolph 14-yard touchdown reception from Lloyd LaFrance, John Kincheloe kick good | 0 | 105 |
| "TOP" = time of possession. For other American football terms, see Glossary of American football. | | | | | | | 0 | 105 |

=== Statistical summary ===
| Team | Category | Player | Statistics |
|---|---|---|---|
| Delaware State | Passing | Rod Lester | 5/18, 34 yards, INT |
| Delaware State | Rushing | Doug Picott | 11 rushes, 53 yards |
| Delaware State | Receiving | Greg Lee | 2 receptions, 18 yards |
| Portland State | Passing | Neil Lomax | 16/28, 311 yards, 8 TD |
| Portland State | Rushing | Neil Lomax | 3 rushes, 23 yards, TD |
| Portland State | Receiving | Clint Didier | 8 receptions, 111 yards, 2 TD |

| Statistics | DSU | PSU |
|---|---|---|
| First downs | 10 | 26 |
| Total offense, plays – yards | 82–61 | 71–451 |
| Rushes–yards (net) | 62–27 | 23–32 |
| Passing yards (net) | 34 | 419 |
| Passes, Comp–Att–Int | 5–20–1 | 26–48–0 |
| Time of Possession | 38:23 | 21:37 |
| PAT: Made-Attempted | 0-0 | 15-15 |
| Fumbles-Lost | 16-6 | 1-0 |
| Penalties-Yards | 7-48 | 4-50 |
| Punts-Yards | 6-178 | 2-60 |
| Passing 1st Downs | 4 | 21 |
| Rushing 1st Downs | 5 | 6 |
| 1st Downs from Penalty | 1 | 1 |
| Kickoff Returns:Number-YDS | 15-209 | 1-74 |
