= Roger Wehrli =

American football player (born 1947)

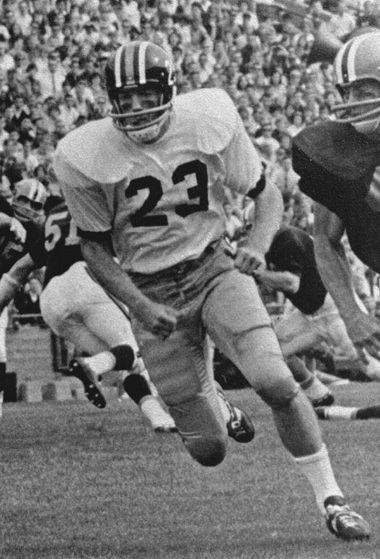
- Wehrli with the Missouri Tigers

No. 22
- Position: Cornerback

Personal information
- Born: November 26, 1947 (age 78); New Point, Missouri, U.S.
- Listed height: 6 ft 0 in (1.83 m)
- Listed weight: 190 lb (86 kg)

Career information
- High school: King City (King City, Missouri)
- College: Missouri (1966–1968)
- NFL draft: 1969: 1st round, 19th overall pick

Career history
- St. Louis Cardinals (1969–1982)

Awards and highlights
- 5× First-team All-Pro (1970, 1974–1977); Second-team All-Pro (1971); 7× Pro Bowl (1970, 1971, 1974–1977, 1979); Arizona Cardinals Ring of Honor; NFL 1970s All-Decade Team; Consensus All-American (1968); 2× First-team All-Big Eight (1967, 1968); Missouri Tigers No. 23 retired

Career NFL statistics
- Interceptions: 40
- Interception yards: 309
- Fumble recoveries: 22
- Sacks: 1
- Defensive touchdowns: 2
- Stats at Pro Football Reference
- Pro Football Hall of Fame
- College Football Hall of Fame

Roger Russell Wehrli (WUR-lee; born November 26, 1947) is an American former professional football player who spent his entire 14-year career as a cornerback for the St. Louis Cardinals of the National Football League (NFL) from 1969 until 1982. He was a seven-time Pro Bowler after playing college football for the Missouri Tigers, where he was a consensus All-American and a first-round draft choice by the Cardinals in 1969. He was inducted to the College Football Hall of Fame in 2003 and the Pro Football Hall of Fame in 2007.

== Early life ==
Wehrli was born in New Point, Missouri. His parents were teachers and his father was a school district superintendent. They enrolled Roger in school at the age of 5. As a result, he started his freshman year of high school at the age of 13. In 1965, Dan Devine recruited Wehrli from King City, Missouri, where he lettered in football, basketball, and track for the Wildkats, as well as help the school win the state title in track in 1965.

== College career ==
Wehrli was assigned to defense by University of Missouri coach Dan Devine. Despite playing on defense, Wehrli was able to get his hands on the ball often enough to be an offensive threat. Wehrli was a two-time All-Big 8 player and was the Big 8 Defensive Player of the Year as a senior. That same year, he was a consensus All-America selection.

Roger had ten career interceptions, with seven coming in his senior season, also returning kickoffs and punts. In 1968, his 40 punt returns and 12-yard return average led the nation. To finish off an 8–3 season, Wehrli had a decisive interception to help lead Missouri to a 35–10 victory over the University of Alabama in the Gator Bowl.

At the time of his College Hall of Fame induction he held school records for career punt returns, punt return yards in a game, season, and career. He played in the Senior Bowl and was named to the 50-year Anniversary All-Senior Bowl team.

Wehrli was a member of the first class of inductees into the Missouri Sports Hall of Fame, located in Springfield.

He was elected to the College Football Hall of Fame in 2003. Wehrli is the 13th person with ties to the University of Missouri to be inducted into the College Hall of Fame. In 1990, Wehrli was voted a charter member of the University of Missouri Intercollegiate Athletics Hall of Fame.

== Professional career ==
"The term ‘Shutdown Corner’ originated with Roger Wehrli. There wasn't a better cornerback I played against. He was a great, great defensive back. You had to be aware of him all the time.”
Roger Staubach

Wehrli's outstanding attribute was his speed. Originally expected to be taken in the third round, he ran a 4.5 40-yard dash and vaulted into the first round. Hall of Fame quarterback Roger Staubach has called Wehrli the best cornerback he played against, and claims that the term "shutdown corner" originated as a description of Wehrli. Although he only played on five winning teams and only went to the playoffs in non-strike years twice, he is considered one of the best cornerbacks in the history of the game.

In his career, Wehrli had 40 career interceptions for 309 yards and recovered 19 fumbles. He was elected to the Pro Football Hall of Fame in 2007. When inducted into the Pro Football Hall of Fame, he became the second Missouri player to be elected, joining former tight end Kellen Winslow, who was enshrined in 1995. Wehrli was inducted into the Cardinals Ring of Honor on October 14, 2007.

An All-Rookie choice in 1969, Wehrli was voted All-Pro in 1970 and was a consensus All-NFC selection including being voted to the Pro Bowl. In 1971, Wehrli was 2nd team All-Pro by the NEA and again was a consensus All-NFC choice and was selected to his second Pro Bowl. In 1972 Wehrli was moved to safety by the Cardinals coaching staff where he played alongside Hall of Famer Larry Wilson. He returned to right cornerback in 1973.

In 1974 Wehrli was again All-Pro and he made his third Pro Bowl and was a consensus All-NFC selection. The following year, 1975 though 1977, he was a consensus All-pro and consensus All-NFC player and a Pro Bowler. In 1978 Wehrli's only post-season honor was being honorable mention All-NFC by UPI as his Cardinal team struggled under new coach Bud Wilkinson. In 1979 Wehrli had a fine season and was a consensus All-NFC pick and made his seventh Pro Bowl. In 1981, after 12 seasons as right cornerback (except for 1972), Wehrli switched to the left side. In his first start at the other corner, he broke up two passes and made four tackles as the Cards shut out the Buffalo Bills, 24–0.

In his 14 seasons, Wehrli played in 193 games. In addition to his starting defensive back duties, he was the holder on the place-kicks. In that role he scored a touchdown in 1982 on a fake field goal.

=== Statistics ===
Legend
	Led the league
	NFL record
**Bold**	Career high

General			Interceptions			
Year	Team	GP	Int	Yds	TD	Lng
1969	STL	13	3	44	0	44
1970	STL	14	**6**	50	0	41
1971	STL	13	2	11	0	6
1972	STL	14	—	—	—	—
1973	STL	11	1	0	0	0
1974	STL	14	2	54	**1**	**53**
1975	STL	14	**6**	31	0	31
1976	STL	14	4	31	0	26
1977	STL	14	5	44	0	41
1978	STL	**16**	4	3	0	3
1979	STL	**16**	2	8	**1**	9
1980	STL	**16**	1	25	0	25
1981	STL	**16**	4	8	0	6
1982	STL	8	—	—	—	—
Career		193	40	309	2	53

== See also ==
- List of NCAA major college yearly punt and kickoff return leaders
