= Jimmy Childs =

American football player (born 1956)

No. 86
- Position: Wide receiver

Personal information
- Born: August 9, 1956 (age 70); El Dorado, Arkansas, U.S.
- Listed height: 6 ft 2 in (1.88 m)
- Listed weight: 194 lb (88 kg)

Career information
- High school: La Puente (La Puente, California)
- College: Cal Poly
- NFL draft: 1978: 4th round, 97th overall pick

Career history
- St. Louis Cardinals (1978–1980); Chicago Bears (1981)*
- * Offseason or practice squad member only

Career NFL statistics
- Receptions: 12
- Receiving yards: 143
- Touchdowns: 1
- Stats at Pro Football Reference

James Joe Childs (born August 9, 1956) is an American former professional football player who was a wide receiver for two seasons in the National Football League (NFL) for the St. Louis Cardinals. He played college football for the Cal Poly Mustangs.

== Early life ==
Childs graduated from La Puente High School in California.

== College career ==
Standing 6-foot-2, Childs played receiver for the Cal Poly Mustangs at California Polytechnic State University, San Luis Obispo.

Collegiate Statistics
School	Season	Rec.	Rec. Yds.	Avg.	Rec. TD
Cal Poly (Fr.)	1974	7	117	16.7	1
Cal Poly (So.)	1975	18	248	13.8	2
Cal Poly (Jr.)	1976	31	637	20.5	6
Cal Poly (Sr.)	1977	28	447	16.0	3
	Totals	84	1,449	17.3	12

== Professional career ==
Childs was selected in the fourth round of the 1978 NFL draft, chosen with the 97th overall pick by the St. Louis Cardinals.

In two seasons with the Cardinals (1978 and 1979), Childs caught a combined 12 passes for 143 yards and one touchdown, starting twice amongst his 21 career games played. He also returned four kickoffs for 77 total yards during his second season.

His only professional touchdown came in the third quarter of a 16-6 loss to the New England Patriots on September 10, 1978, as he caught an 8-yard scoring pass from Jim Hart.

Childs was also a member of the Chicago Bears in 1981, but did not make the final roster.
