= Mike McGraw =

American football player (born 1953)

No. 52, 54
- Position: Linebacker

Personal information
- Born: December 27, 1953 (age 72); Denver, Colorado, U.S.
- Listed height: 6 ft 2 in (1.88 m)
- Listed weight: 225 lb (102 kg)

Career information
- High school: Poudre
- College: Wyoming
- NFL draft: 1975: 10th round, 255th overall pick

Career history
- St. Louis Cardinals (1975)*; New England Patriots (1976)*; St. Louis Cardinals (1976); New England Patriots (1977)*; Detroit Lions (1977); Washington Redskins (1978)*; San Francisco 49ers (1980)*
- * Offseason or practice squad member only
- Stats at Pro Football Reference

Michael Shane McGraw (born December 27, 1953) is an American former professional football player who was a linebacker for the St. Louis Cardinals and the Detroit Lions of National Football League (NFL). He played college football for the University of Wyoming.
