= Quentin Walker =

American football player (born 1961)

No. 33
- Position: Running back

Personal information
- Born: August 27, 1961 (age 65); Teaneck, New Jersey, U.S.
- Listed height: 6 ft 1 in (1.85 m)
- Listed weight: 205 lb (93 kg)

Career information
- High school: Teaneck (NJ)
- College: Virginia
- NFL draft: 1984: 7th round, 185 (by the St. Louis Cardinals)th overall pick

Career history
- St. Louis Cardinals (1984); Tampa Bay Buccaneers (1987)
- Stats at Pro Football Reference

Quentin Walker (born August 27, 1961) is an American former professional football running back who played for the St. Louis Cardinals of the National Football League (NFL) for one season. He played college football at Virginia.

A native of Teaneck, New Jersey, Walker played prep football at Teaneck High School, where he graduated in 1979.

== College career ==
Walker played college football for the University of Virginia.
