= Neil O'Donoghue =

Irish gridiron football player (born 1953)

Personal information
- Born: 18 January 1953 (age 73) Dublin, Ireland
- Height: 6 ft 6 in (198 cm)
- Weight: 208 lb (94 kg; 14 st 12 lb)
Association football career
Youth career
- 1961–1965: Round Towers GAA (Clondalkin)
College career
Years	Team	Apps	(Gls)
1973	St. Bernard College Saints		
Senior career*
Years	Team	Apps	(Gls)
1969–1970	Drumcondra		
1971–1972	Shamrock Rovers	12	(3)
1978	Shelbourne		
- * Club domestic league appearances and goals

Sport
- Football career

Profile
- Position: Placekicker

Career information
- College: Auburn
- NFL draft: 1977: 5th round, 127th overall pick

Career history
- Buffalo Bills (1977); Tampa Bay Buccaneers (1978–1979); St. Louis Cardinals (1980–1985)

Awards and highlights
- Second-team All-SEC (1976)

Career NFL statistics
- Field goals: 112
- Field goal attempts: 189
- Field goal %: 59.3
- Longest field goal: 52
- Stats at Pro Football Reference

Cornelius Joseph Dennis O'Donoghue (born 18 January 1953) is an Irish-born former professional football placekicker, who played nine seasons in the National Football League (NFL). He played college football for the Auburn Tigers and was drafted by the Buffalo Bills in the fifth round of the 1977 NFL draft. He was also a member of the Tampa Bay Buccaneers and the St. Louis Cardinals.

From 1987 to 2023, until Daniel Whelan was selected as punter for the Green Bay Packers, O'Donoghue had been the most recent Irish-born American to have played in the NFL. At 6 ft 6 inches, he is the tallest kicker in NFL history.

== Early life ==
O'Donoghue was born on 18 January 1953 in Dublin, the second son of Michael and Mary O'Donoghue (née Horgan). He was named after his maternal uncle, a member of the Royal Inniskilling Fusiliers, who died fighting in the Second World War. His mother worked as a nurse and also joined the war effort, as part of the Queen Alexandra's. This took her across Europe and North Africa, before moving to the United States to continue her work as a nurse. In order to apply for American citizenship, she briefly lived in Cuba and on the news of her father's death, returned to Ireland, where she reconnected with Michael O'Donoghue, who worked for Great Southern Railways. Although he preferred hurling, he was better known for his career in field hockey, spending ten years as a full-back for the Ireland national field hockey team, and was later named as the first Catholic president of the Irish Hockey Union.

O'Donoghue's family moved to Clondalkin, where his father became the sports administrator of Round Towers. O'Donoghue was described as one of the best juvenile players that Round Towers had produced. He played U13 Football at the age of eight and won an U13 League Final against St Pats Palmerstown in 1965. In his youth, he was known as Corny O'Donoghue, a reference to a character from James Joyce's Ulysses.

In 1971, while representing Dublin, he faced off against Cork's Jimmy Barry-Murphy in the All-Ireland Minor Football Championship semi-final, which saw Cork prevail over Dublin.

== Association football ==
O'Donoghue began his soccer career with Drumcondra. At the time, he was known as Con O'Donoghue, a homage to Con Martin, who had also played for the Drums. He made his League of Ireland debut at some point in the 1969–70 season. On 17 October 1971, O'Donoghue made his debut for Shamrock Rovers against Sligo Rovers, coming on as a substitute for Damien Richardson. On 31 October, and in his second game for the Hoops, he scored his first goal at Glenmalure Park against Limerick. He made a total of 16 appearances, including two each in the Texaco Cup and the FAI Cup, scoring 3 goals.

O'Donoghue's brother Coli spent the summer of 1970 in Alabama and played soccer on the weekends. He was offered a soccer scholarship at Saint Bernard College, but declined as he was studying architecture in Ireland. However, he did suggest that O'Donoghue should take the scholarship instead. O'Donoghue was working part-time for CIÉ as a ticket inspector, and with his mother returning to her nursing job, he decided to visit the campus where he became the first Irish person to be awarded a soccer scholarship. His time at the college was short-lived due to the oil crisis and the college's soccer program was cancelled, resulting in O'Donoghue beginning his new career as a placekicker in college football.

In February 1978, he returned home at the end of the 1977 NFL season to play for Shelbourne. During this time, he was briefly on the same team with Jimmy Johnstone.

== American football ==
Believing he could become a placekicker and gain a full football scholarship, O'Donoghue travelled to Auburn University to meet Ralph Jordan, the head coach of the football team. He had previously been to Auburn before, attending as a spectator for the Iron Bowl match. Jordan had him make a field goal attempt, and after he converted each one successfully, he won the job. Within two years, he had received All-American honors. O'Donoghue's 57-yard field goal against the Tennessee Volunteers in 1976 still remains tied for the record for the longest field goal in Auburn history.

O'Donoghue was selected in the fifth round of the 1977 NFL draft by the Buffalo Bills, but was cut five games into the 1977 season, despite ending a fourteen game losing streak by scoring the sole field goal against the Atlanta Falcons. After lengthy immigration problems, he was picked up by the Tampa Bay Buccaneers in 1978. The Bucs had joined the league in 1976 and had compiled a 2–26 record in their first two years. O'Donoghue played two years with the Bucs, helping them improve to a 15–17 record by converting 55 of 64 point after touchdown attempts and 24 of 43 field goal attempts. In the 1979 season, O'Donoghue's sole field goal against the Kansas City Chiefs, in a game dubbed "the Rain Bowl", meant that Tampa Bay won the NFC Central for the first time. In the playoffs, O'Donoghue made a 19-yard field goal against the Philadelphia Eagles, effectively sending the Bucs to the NFC Championship Game against the Los Angeles Rams. Neither side were able to score a touchdown, but the Bucs were blown out 9–0, with the Rams' Frank Corral making all three field goals. Over the summer, head coach John McKay found his kicking to be too erratic and he was replaced with Garo Yepremian, after which he worked in construction.

O'Donoghue joined the St. Louis Cardinals, just prior to the 1980 season. Head coach Jim Hanifan had O'Donoghue and Steve Little, a former first-round pick who had struggled in the NFL, participate in a kicking contest from 25 yards out. Little made nine out of 16 attempts, while O'Donoghue made fourteen, resulting in him becoming the team's starting kicker. The next day, he ran into Little, who offered him out for a drink, but O'Donoghue declined as he felt he too was rusty and had to practice before the season opener against the Washington Redskins. O'Donoghue would later find out that Little was involved in a car accident, leading to him spending the rest of his life as a quadriplegic. In the 1982 season, O'Donoghue made it to the playoffs for the second time in his career, but in the wildcard round, he made two field goals and had a kick blocked, as the Green Bay Packers defeated the Cardinals 41–16.

Even though he had the support of Hanifan, he ultimately became known for his high-profile missed kicks. In the 1983 season, he missed three field goal attempts in overtime of a Monday Night Football game against the New York Giants, resulting in a 20–20 tie. In the last game of the 1984 season against the Redskins, he missed a potential game-winning kick that would have sent his Cardinals to the playoffs. During that season, O'Donoghue tied the long-standing Cardinals record for most points in a season, which at the time was 117. In the 1985 season, he was cut after missing three attempts against the Houston Oilers. After his career in the NFL, O'Donoghue sold real estate for a few years, then got into car sales.

== Personal life ==
O'Donoghue married his first wife Laura, during his stint with the Tampa Bay Buccaneers. They lived in Indian Rocks Beach, Florida, and had one daughter, Daeja. They divorced in the late 1980s. He remarried shortly after to his second wife Monica, and currently resides in Clearwater, Florida. They have two children, Neil Jr. and Courtney. His son works in the film industry under the stage name Cornelius O'Donoghue.

O'Donoghue was the only member of his family to emigrate to the United States and become an American citizen. His older brother, Coli, is a partner at an architectural firm based out of Dublin.
