= Eric Swanson (American football) =

American football player (born 1963)

No. 86
- Position: Wide receiver

Personal information
- Born: August 25, 1963 (age 63); San Bernardino, California, U.S.
- Listed height: 5 ft 11 in (1.80 m)
- Listed weight: 186 lb (84 kg)

Career information
- High school: Pacific (San Bernardino)
- College: Tennessee
- NFL draft: 1986: 7th round, 170th overall pick

Career history
- St. Louis Cardinals (1986)

Career NFL statistics
- Games played: 9
- Stats at Pro Football Reference

Eric Charles Swanson (born August 25, 1963) is a former American professional football player who was a wide receiver for the St. Louis Cardinalsin the National Football League (NFL). He played college football for the Tennessee Volunteers and was selected by the Cardinals in the seventh round of the 1986 NFL draft with the 170th overall pick. Swanson played in one season for the Cardinals in 1986. He appeared in nine games and handled some kickoff return duties.
