= Pat Tilley =

American football player and coach (born 1953)

No. 83
- Position: Wide receiver

Personal information
- Born: February 15, 1953 (age 73); Shreveport, Louisiana, U.S.
- Listed height: 5 ft 10 in (1.78 m)
- Listed weight: 178 lb (81 kg)

Career information
- High school: Fair Park (Shreveport, Louisiana)
- College: Louisiana Tech
- NFL draft: 1976: 4th round, 114th overall pick

Career history

Playing
- St. Louis Cardinals (1976–1986)

Coaching
- Bossier City Battle Wings (2001–2002) Head coach

Awards and highlights
- Pro Bowl (1980); Louisiana Tech Hall of Fame

Career NFL statistics
- Receptions: 468
- Receiving yards: 7,005
- Receiving TDs: 37
- Stats at Pro Football Reference

Patrick Lee Tilley (born February 15, 1953) is an American former professional football player who was a wide receiver in the National Football League (NFL) for the St. Louis Cardinals (1976–1986). He was selected to the Pro Bowl after the 1980 season.

Tilley played football and graduated in 1971 from Fair Park High School in Shreveport. Thereafter, he enrolled at Louisiana Tech University in Ruston, where he played for the Bulldogs.

Tilley led the St. Louis Cardinals in receiving from 1978 to 1982 and started every game but one from 1978 to 1985. His best season was in 1981 when he caught 66 passes for 1,040 yards and three touchdowns.

After his football career ended with the 1986 season with the St. Louis Cardinals, Tilley became the area director for the Fellowship of Christian Athletes and gave motivational messages throughout northwest Louisiana. In his Christian testimony, Tilley said, "When I put God first in my life, my football career boomed." Tilley also coached the Bossier City Battle Wings of af2.

== NFL career statistics ==
Legend
**Bold**	Career high

=== Regular season ===
Year	Team	Games		Receiving				
Year	Team	GP	GS	Rec	Yds	Avg	Lng	TD
1976	STL	13	5	26	407	15.7	45	1
1977	STL	14	0	5	64	12.8	31	0
1978	STL	**16**	**16**	62	900	14.5	43	3
1979	STL	**16**	15	57	938	16.5	51	**6**
1980	STL	14	14	**68**	966	14.2	60	**6**
1981	STL	**16**	**16**	66	**1,040**	15.8	**75**	3
1982	STL	9	8	36	465	12.9	34	2
1983	STL	**16**	**16**	44	690	15.7	71	5
1984	STL	**16**	**16**	52	758	14.6	42	5
1985	STL	**16**	**16**	49	726	14.8	46	**6**
1986	STL	1	1	3	51	**17.0**	18	0
		147	123	468	7,005	15.0	75	37

=== Playoffs ===
Year	Team	Games		Receiving				
Year	Team	GP	GS	Rec	Yds	Avg	Lng	TD
1982	STL	**1**	**1**	**5**	**55**	**11.0**	**23**	**1**
		1	1	5	55	11.0	23	1
