= Jim Hanifan =

American football player and coach (1933–2020)

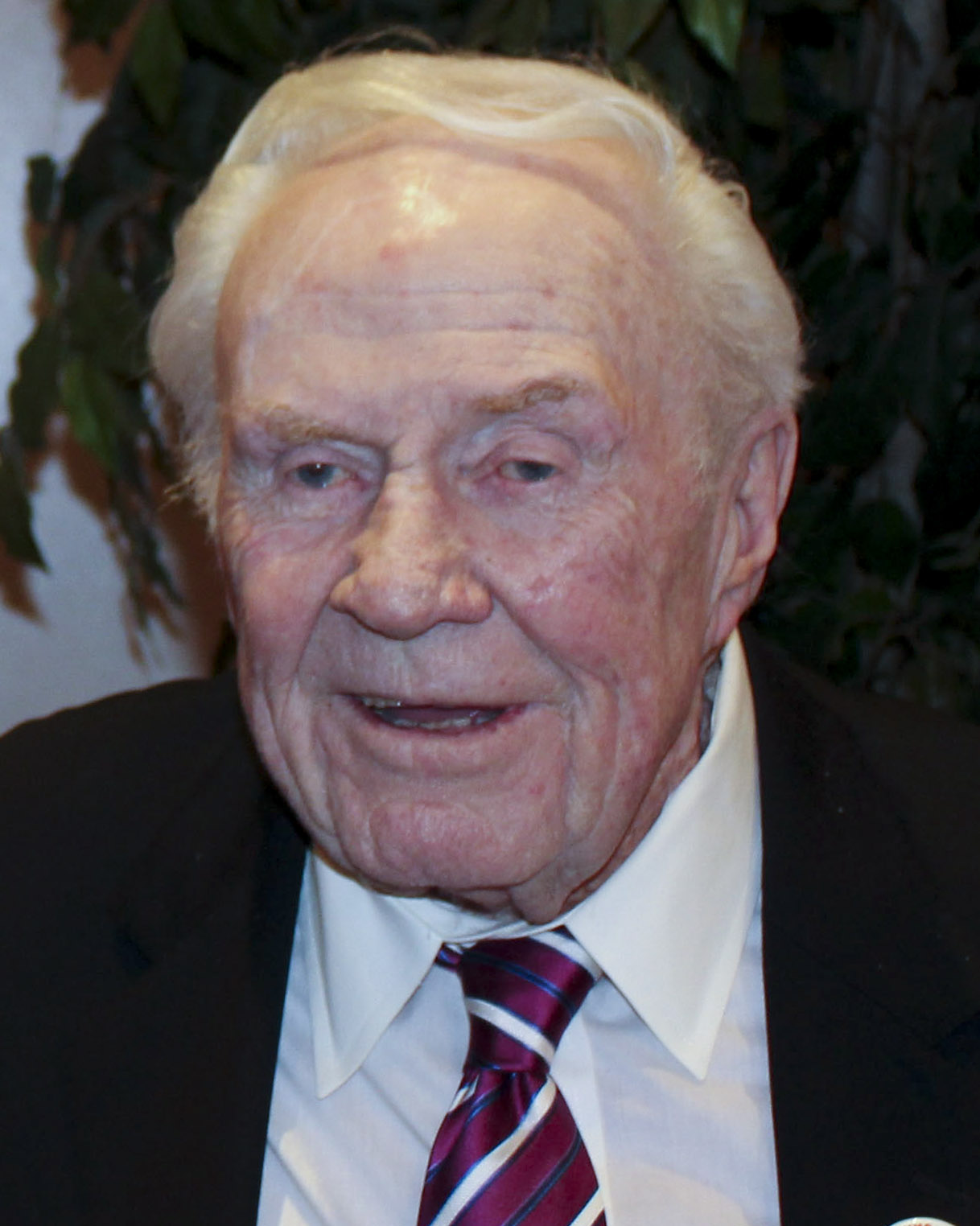
- Hanifan in 2016

Personal information
- Born: September 21, 1933; Compton, California, U.S.
- Died: November 24, 2020 (aged 87); St. Louis, Missouri, U.S.

Career information
- College: California
- NFL draft: 1955: 12th round, 139th overall pick

Career history

Playing
- Toronto Argonauts (1955)

Coaching
- Glendale (CA) (1964–1965) Assistant; Utah (1966–1969) Assistant; California (1970–1971) Assistant; San Diego State (1972) Assistant; St. Louis Cardinals (1973–1978) Offensive line; San Diego Chargers (1979) Offensive line / assistant head coach; St. Louis Cardinals (1980–1985) Head coach; Atlanta Falcons (1987–1989) Offensive line / assistant head coach; Atlanta Falcons (1989) Interim head coach; Washington Redskins (1990–1996) Offensive line; St. Louis Rams (1997–2003) Offensive line

Awards and highlights
- 2× Super Bowl champion (XXVI, XXXIV); First-team All-PCC (1954)

Head coaching record
- Regular season: 39–53–1 (.425)
- Postseason: 0–1 (.000)
- Career: 39–54–1 (.420)
- Coaching profile at Pro Football Reference

James Martin Michael Hanifan (September 21, 1933 – November 24, 2020) was an American professional football player and coach. He served as the head coach for the St. Louis Cardinals of the National Football League (NFL) from 1980 to 1985 and as interim head coach for the NFL's Atlanta Falcons for four games in 1989, compiling a record of 39–53–1.

Hanifan played college football with the California Golden Bears. He played one season professionally with the Toronto Argonauts of the Canadian Football League (CFL) before being drafted into the U.S. Army. After getting out of the service, he was an assistant coach in college and the NFL before becoming a head coach.

== Playing career ==
Hanifan played college football at the University of California, Berkeley, where he was an All-American and led the nation in receiving in 1954. He played professionally for one season with the Toronto Argonauts of the Canadian Football League. He was then drafted into the U.S. Army.

== Coaching career ==
From 1959 to 1965, he coached at the high school (Charter Oak High School) and junior college level, he developed a reputation as an outstanding teacher and an offensive line guru.

He was an assistant coach at Utah from 1966 to 1969, California from 1970 to 1971, and San Diego State in 1972. During this time Hanifan joined the NFL in 1973, serving as offensive line coach for the St. Louis Cardinals until 1978. He was recognized as the NFL's Assistant Coach of the Year in 1977. After one year with the San Diego Chargers, Hanifan returned to the Cardinals and was their head coach from 1980 to 1985.

Hanifan went 39–49–1 in his six seasons with the Cardinals, leading St. Louis to the 16-team playoff tournament during the strike-shortened 1982 season. The "Gridbirds" went 8–7–1 in 1983 with a victory over the eventual Super Bowl champion Los Angeles Raiders, and in 1984, St. Louis was in position to win the NFC East championship with a victory in the season finale against the Washington Redskins. But Cardinal kicker Neil O'Donoghue missed a game-winning field goal attempt, giving the Redskins a 29–27 victory and the division title, while St. Louis was left out of the playoffs despite a 9–7 record. In 1985, St. Louis started the year 3–1 but won only two of its final 12 games and finished at 5–11. Hanifan was fired that year by having the locks to his office changed during halftime of the final game of the year, against the Redskins. Hanifan is tied with Jimmy Conzelman and Ken Whisenhunt as the longest-serving head coaches in Cardinals history, with a mere six years of service. Conzelman coached the team on two separate occasions, while Hanifan's and Whisenhunt's tenures were consecutive. His 39 wins are the fourth-most in Cardinals history behind Bruce Arians (50), Ken Whisenhunt (49) and Don Coryell (42).

Hanifan resumed his coaching career as an assistant coach with the Atlanta Falcons (1987–1989), and he served as the interim head coach when Marion Campbell was fired. He spent seven seasons as offensive line coach for the Washington Redskins (1990–1996) and St. Louis Rams (1997–2003) before retiring.

=== Head coaching record ===
Team	Year	Regular Season					Postseason			
Team	Year	Won	Lost	Ties	Win %	Finish	Won	Lost	Win %	Result
STL	1980	5	11	0	.313	4th in NFC East	–	–	–	–
STL	1981	7	9	0	.438	5th in NFC East	–	–	–	–
STL	1982	5	4	0	.556	6th in NFC	0	1	.000	Lost to Green Bay Packers in NFC First round game.
STL	1983	8	7	1	.531	3rd in NFC East	–	–	–	–
STL	1984	9	7	0	.563	3rd in NFC East	–	–	–	–
STL	1985	5	11	0	.313	5th in NFC East	–	–	–	–
SLC total		39	49	1	.444		0	1	.000	
ATL	1989	0	4	0	.000	4th in NFC West	–	–	–	–
ATL total		0	4	0	.000	4th in NFC West	–	–	–	
Total		39	53	1	.425		0	1	.000	

== Commentator career ==
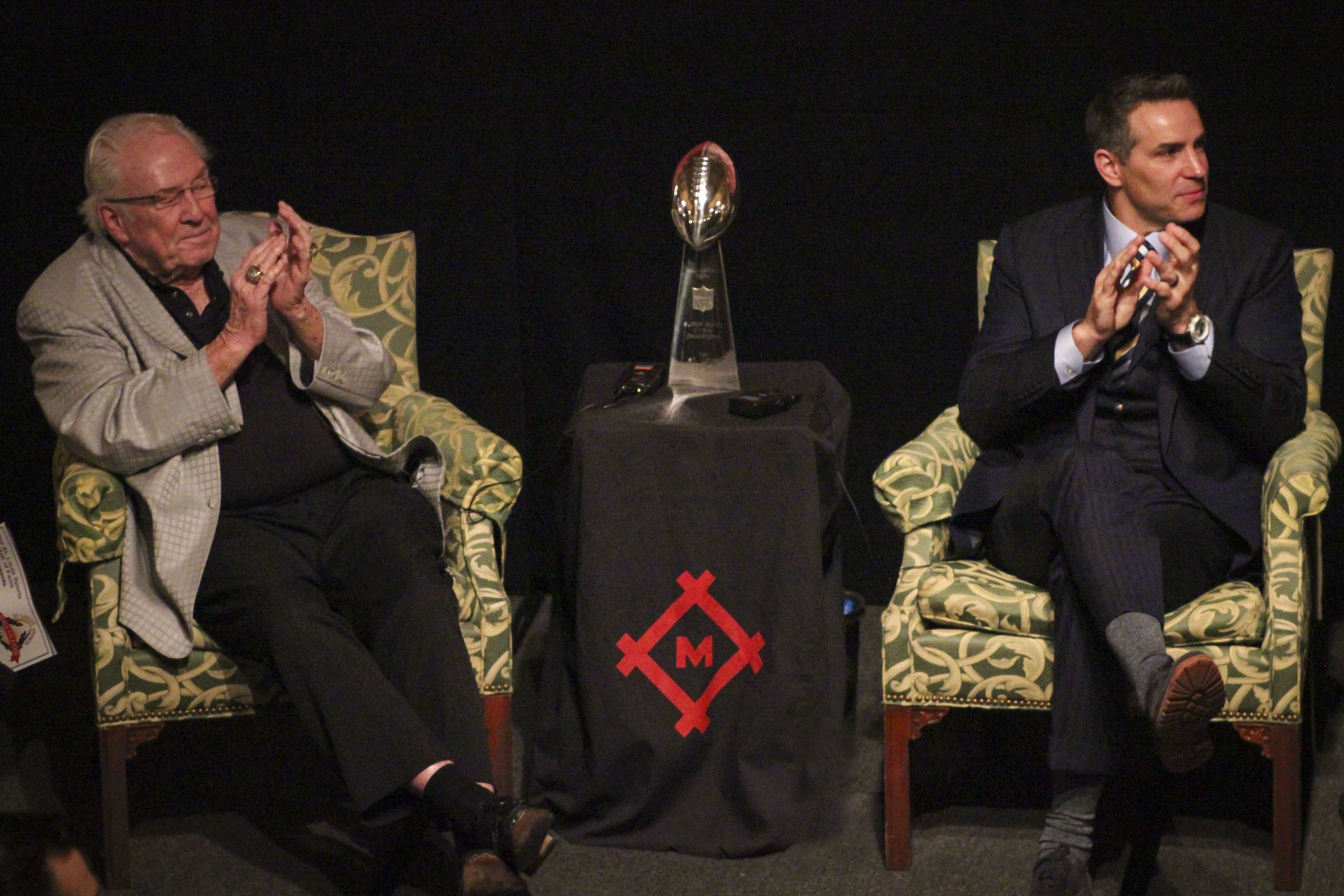
Hanifan (left) along with Kurt Warner.

From 2004 to 2008, Hanifan was a color commentator for the Rams radio broadcast team and hosted a weekly show on St. Louis station KLOU. During his time in the booth, Hanifan was known for praising and critiquing players, a style that was described as a "refreshing, straight-from-the-gut manner rarely heard anymore". Effective for the Rams' 2009 move to 101 ESPN, Hanifan has been replaced as the lead color commentator by former Super Bowl champion D'Marco Farr, and has been relegated to the analyst role on the pregame and postgame shows. The move has caused quite a stir among St. Louisans, inspiring several negatively toned articles by St. Louis Post-Dispatch columnist Dan Caesar, begging the Rams to reinstate Hanifan to the broadcast booth, his argument being that Rams fans will not listen to the broadcasts if Hanifan is not there. In August 2011, Hanifan's role was reduced further to a Thursday evening piece and a taped preview played during the pre-game.

== Autobiography ==
Hanifan wrote an autobiography recounting his career titled "Beyond X's and O's: My Thirty Years in Football." He also produced a series of instructional videos on offensive line play.

== Death ==
Hanifan died on November 24, 2020, in St. Louis, Missouri, at age 87.

== See also ==
- List of NCAA major college football yearly receiving leaders
