= John Barefield =

American football player (born 1955)

No. 58
- Position: Linebacker

Personal information
- Born: March 23, 1955 (age 71); Victoria, Texas, U.S.
- Listed height: 6 ft 2 in (1.88 m)
- Listed weight: 224 lb (102 kg)

Career information
- High school: Stroman (Victoria)
- College: Texas A&M–Kingsville
- NFL draft: 1978: 2nd round, 42nd overall pick

Career history
- St. Louis Cardinals (1978–1980); Denver Gold (1983); Los Angeles Express (1983); San Antonio Gunslingers (1984–1985)
- Stats at Pro Football Reference

John Barefield (born March 23, 1955) is an American former professional football player who was a linebacker for the St. Louis Cardinals of the National Football League (NFL) from 1978 to 1980. He played college football for the Texas A&M–Kingsville Javelinas.
