= Rush Brown =

American football player (1954–2020)

No. 69, 78
- Positions: Defensive tackle, defensive end

Personal information
- Born: June 27, 1954; Laurinburg, North Carolina, U.S.
- Died: February 6, 2020 (aged 65); Cumming, Georgia, U.S.
- Listed height: 6 ft 2 in (1.88 m)
- Listed weight: 257 lb (117 kg)

Career information
- High school: Scotland (Laurinburg)
- College: Ball State
- NFL draft: 1980: 10th round, 255th overall pick

Career history
- St. Louis Cardinals (1980–1983); Jacksonville Bulls (1984); Arizona Outlaws (1985)

Awards and highlights
- PFWA All-Rookie Team (1980)

Career NFL statistics
- Sacks: 8.5
- Fumble recoveries: 3
- Interceptions: 1
- Stats at Pro Football Reference

Rush Brown Jr. (June 27, 1954 – February 6, 2020) was an American professional football player who played defensive tackle for four seasons for the National Football League (NFL)'s St. Louis Cardinals. He started 32 of his first 41 games, but appeared in only six of his last 16 games (with 1 start). Brown was selected to the NFL All-Rookie Team in 1980.

Brown attended Scotland High School in Laurinburg, North Carolina. He enlisted in the U.S. Army right after high school. He was stationed in Europe, and was assigned to the 60th Ordnance Group in Zweibrucken, Germany. Brown was invited to play football in the U.S. Air Force, since there was no football team in the U.S. Army. He later was named the 1975 Player of the Year in the United States Air Force of Europe football league. While playing football for the U.S. Air Force, Brown attracted attention from a professor who encouraged him to attend Ball State University. Rush ended his military career as a second lieutenant before pursuing an education at Ball State.

Brown died on February 6, 2020, at age 65.
