= George Collins (American football) =

American football player (born 1955)

No. 66
- Position: Offensive tackle

Personal information
- Born: December 9, 1955 (age 70); Macon, Georgia, U.S.
- Listed height: 6 ft 2 in (1.88 m)
- Listed weight: 257 lb (117 kg)

Career information
- High school: Warner Robins (Warner Robins, Georgia)
- College: Georgia
- NFL draft: 1978: 4th round, 96th overall pick

Career history
- St. Louis Cardinals (1978–1982); San Francisco 49ers (1983)*; Jacksonville Bulls (1984–1985)
- * Offseason or practice squad member only

Awards and highlights
- First-team All-SEC (1977)

Career NFL statistics
- Games played: 69
- Games started: 26
- Fumble recoveries: 2
- Stats at Pro Football Reference

George Collins (born December 9, 1955) is an American former professional football player who was an offensive tackle for five seasons in the National Football League (NFL) and two seasons in the United States Football League (USFL). He played college football for the Georgia Bulldogs.

== Early life ==
Collins was born in Macon, Georgia, and attended Warner Robins High School. He was named All-State and an All-American as a senior.

== College career ==
Collins was a member of the Georgia Bulldogs for four seasons. He began his collegiate career as a tight end, but was moved to the guard position by coaches who recognized his blocking abilities and encouraged him to gain weight. He became a starter at guard and was named first-team All-Southeastern Conference and a first-team All-American by the Sporting News.

== Professional career ==
Collins was selected 96th overall in the fourth round of the 1978 NFL draft by the St. Louis Cardinals. He played five seasons with the Cardinals, playing in 69 games with 26 starts. Collins started 13 games during the 1981 season, taking over at left tackle after starter Keith Wortman was waived. He was traded to the San Francisco 49ers in April of 1983, but was cut during training camp. Collins was later signed by the Jacksonville Bulls of the United States Football League and spent two seasons with the team.

== Coaching career ==
After retiring from professional football Collins returned to Georgia as a graduate assistant and earned a master of education degree. He became an offensive line coach at Valdosta State University after graduating. He later entered teaching and was the head football coach at Perry High School, Houston County High School and Rutland High School before retiring in 2015.
