= Dave Stief =

American football player (1956–2000)

No. 84, 21, 83
- Positions: Wide receiver, defensive back

Personal information
- Born: January 29, 1956; Portland, Oregon, U.S.
- Died: May 28, 2000 (aged 44); Corbett, Oregon, U.S.
- Listed height: 6 ft 3 in (1.91 m)
- Listed weight: 195 lb (88 kg)

Career information
- College: Portland State
- NFL draft: 1978: 7th round, 181st overall pick

Career history
- St. Louis Cardinals (1978–1982); Washington Redskins (1983)

Career NFL statistics
- Receptions: 67
- Receiving yards: 1,043
- Receiving touchdowns: 5
- Stats at Pro Football Reference

David P. Stief (January 29, 1956 – May 28, 2000) was an American professional football wide receiver in the National Football League (NFL) for the St. Louis Cardinals and the Washington Redskins. Born in Portland, Oregon, he played college football at Portland State University and was selected in the seventh round of the 1978 NFL draft.

Dave Stief played a key role in Mouse Davis’ early Run-and-Shoot offenses at Portland State. During his four seasons, Stief set PSU career records for most touchdown receptions (22) and most receiving yards (2,581). He also set a PSU season record for most touchdown catches in a season (12 in 1977). Stief made one of the most memorable catches in PSU history, the game-winning touchdown in the historic 50–49 win over Montana in 1976.

Despite being a role player as a receiver with the Cardinals, he recorded 24 catches for 477 yards and 4 TD as a rookie in 1978 along with completing 1 pass for 43 yards. The next year, he hauled in 22 catches for 324 yards. In 1980, he hauled in 16 catches for 165 yards. In 1981, Stief mostly played special teams but recorded 5 catches for 77 yards and one touchdown. After playing special teams in 1982, he moved on to the Washington Redskins in 1983 but retired after only playing 3 games.

He died in 2000 of esophageal cancer in Corbett, Oregon.
