= Randy Love =

American football player (born 1956)

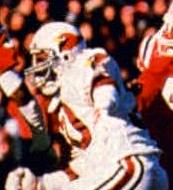
- Love playing for the Cardinals in 1984

No. 40, 44
- Position: Running back

Personal information
- Born: September 30, 1956 (age 70); Garland, Texas, U.S.
- Listed height: 6 ft 1 in (1.85 m)
- Listed weight: 208 lb (94 kg)

Career information
- High school: Garland (Garland, Texas)
- College: Houston
- NFL draft: 1979: 8th round, 216th overall pick

Career history
- St. Louis Cardinals (1979–1985)

Awards and highlights
- Second-team All-SWC (1978)

Career NFL statistics
- Rushing yards: 211
- Rushing average: 3.2
- Rushing touchdowns: 3
- Stats at Pro Football Reference

Randy Louis Love (born September 30, 1956) is an American football former running back who played in the National Football League (NFL). He was selected in the 8th round (216th overall) of the 1979 NFL draft by the New England Patriots after playing college football for the University of Houston. He played seven seasons for the St. Louis Cardinals. He is now a Varsity Basketball Head Coach for the Garland Owls in Garland, Texas.
