= Mike Dawson (defensive end) =

American football player (1953–2008)

No. 73
- Position: Defensive end

Personal information
- Born: October 16, 1953; Dorking, England
- Died: March 14, 2008 (aged 54); Tucson, Arizona, U.S
- Listed height: 6 ft 4 in (1.93 m)
- Listed weight: 270 lb (122 kg)

Career information
- High school: Tucson (Tucson, Arizona, U.S.)
- College: Arizona
- NFL draft: 1976: 1st round, 22nd overall pick

Career history
- St. Louis Cardinals (1976–1982); Detroit Lions (1983); Kansas City Chiefs (1984)

Awards and highlights
- PFWA All-Rookie Team (1976); Second-team All-American (1975); WAC Lineman of the Year (1975)

Career NFL statistics
- Sacks: 5.5
- Interceptions: 1
- Fumble recoveries: 4
- Stats at Pro Football Reference

Michael Daniel Dawson (October 16, 1953 – March 14, 2008) was an American professional football player who was a defensive end in the National Football League (NFL). He was selected by the St. Louis Cardinals in the 1st round (22nd overall) of the 1976 NFL draft. A 6'4", 256 lb. defensive end from the University of Arizona, Dawson played in nine NFL seasons from 1976 to 1984 for the Cardinals, Detroit Lions and Kansas City Chiefs.
