= Stafford Mays =

American football player (born 1958)

No. 76, 73
- Position: Defensive tackle

Personal information
- Born: March 13, 1958 (age 68); Lawrence, Kansas, U.S.
- Listed height: 6 ft 2 in (1.88 m)
- Listed weight: 252 lb (114 kg)

Career information
- High school: Lincoln (Tacoma, Washington)
- College: Washington
- NFL draft: 1980: 9th round, 225th overall pick

Career history
- St. Louis Cardinals (1980–1986); Minnesota Vikings (1987–1988)

Career NFL statistics
- Sacks: 18.5
- Fumble recoveries: 6
- Stats at Pro Football Reference

Stafford Earl Mays (born March 13, 1958) is an American former professional football player who was a defensive tackle in the National Football League (NFL). He played college football for the Washington Huskies.

== Life and career ==
Mays was born in Lawrence, Kansas. He went to Lincoln High School in Tacoma, Washington. Mays played junior college football at Mount Hood Community College. He later played college football at the University of Washington.

Mays played in the National Football League as a defensive end and defensive tackle for the St. Louis Cardinals and the Minnesota Vikings between 1980 and 1988. He was drafted in the ninth round of the 1980 NFL Draft. Mays later worked as an executive at Microsoft.

Mays's son, Taylor Mays, was a standout player at O'Dea High School in Seattle and then the University of Southern California. He went on to play safety in both the NFL and CFL.
