= Charles Baker (American football) =

American football player (born 1957)

No. 52
- Position: Linebacker

Personal information
- Born: September 26, 1957 (age 69); Mount Pleasant, Texas, U.S.
- Listed height: 6 ft 2 in (1.88 m)
- Listed weight: 226 lb (103 kg)

Career information
- College: New Mexico
- NFL draft: 1980: 3rd round, 81st overall pick

Career history
- St. Louis Cardinals (1980–1987)

Career NFL statistics
- Sacks: 9.5
- Fumble recoveries: 4
- Stats at Pro Football Reference

Charles Edward Baker (born September 26, 1957) is an American former professional football player who was a linebacker for eight seasons for the St. Louis Cardinals.
