= Randy Clark (American football) =

American football player (born 1957)

No. 64, 66
- Positions: Center, tackle

Personal information
- Born: July 27, 1957 (age 69); Chicago, Illinois, U.S.
- Listed height: 6 ft 3 in (1.91 m)
- Listed weight: 260 lb (118 kg)

Career information
- High school: Prospect (Mount Prospect, Illinois)
- College: Northern Illinois
- NFL draft: 1980: 8th round, 215th overall pick

Career history
- Chicago Bears (1980)*; St. Louis Cardinals (1980–1986); New York Jets (1987)*; Atlanta Falcons (1987)
- * Offseason or practice squad member only

Career NFL statistics
- Games played: 94
- Games started: 58
- Fumble recoveries: 2
- Stats at Pro Football Reference

Randall Byron Clark (born July 27, 1957) is an American former professional football player who was a center and tackle for eight seasons in the National Football League (NFL) with the St. Louis Cardinals and the Atlanta Falcons. He played college football for the Northern Illinois Huskies.

Clark's early career centered on the Chicago region. He played for Prospect High School in the suburb of Mt. Prospect, then at Northern Illinois University before being selected 215th overall by the Chicago Bears in the eighth round of the 1980 NFL draft.
