= Lee Nelson (American football) =

American football player (born 1954)

No. 38
- Positions: Cornerback, safety

Personal information
- Born: January 30, 1954 (age 72); Kissimmee, Florida, U.S.
- Listed height: 5 ft 10 in (1.78 m)
- Listed weight: 185 lb (84 kg)

Career information
- High school: Melbourne
- College: Florida State
- NFL draft: 1976: 15th round, 420th overall pick

Career history
- St. Louis Cardinals (1976–1985)

Career NFL statistics
- Interceptions: 7
- Fumble recoveries: 9
- Sacks: 9
- Stats at Pro Football Reference

Lee Nelson (born January 30, 1954) is an American former professional football player who was a defensive back for 10 seasons with the St. Louis Cardinals of the National Football League (NFL). He played college football for the Florida State Seminoles.

== College career ==
Nelson transferred to Florida State University from Pensacola Junior College in 1974. He walked on to the Seminole team and quickly won a starting cornerback job. He led the team in tackles his junior year (86) and was named the defensive MVP his senior year. He finished his college career by playing in the American Bowl All-Star Game. He was inducted into the Florida State Sports Hall of Fame in 1987.

== Pro career ==
Nelson was selected in the fifteenth round by the St. Louis Cardinals in the 1976 NFL draft. He played in 135 games at cornerback and strong safety over ten seasons with the Cardinals. He scored one touchdown on a fumble recovery against the Kansas City Chiefs in 1983. Nelson retired from the Cardinals after the 1985 season. He finished his career with seven interceptions, nine sacks, and nine fumble recoveries.
