= List of Arizona Cardinals starting quarterbacks =

These quarterbacks have started at least one game for the National Football League (NFL)'s Arizona Cardinals.

The early era of the NFL and American football in general was not conducive to passing the football, with the forward pass not being legalized until the early 1900s and not fully adopted for many more years. Although the quarterback position has historically been the one to receive the snap and thus handle the football on every offensive play, the importance of the position during this era was limited by various rules, like having to be five yards behind the line of scrimmage before a forward pass could be attempted. These rules and the tactical focus on rushing the ball limited the importance of the quarterback position while enhancing the value of different types of backs, such as the halfback and the fullback. Some of these backs were considered triple-threat men, capable of rushing, passing or kicking the football, making it common for multiple players to attempt a pass during a game.

As rules changed and the NFL began adopting a more pass-centric approach to offensive football, the importance of the quarterback position grew. Beginning in 1950, total wins and losses by a team's starting quarterback were tracked. Prior to 1950, the Cardinals had numerous players identified as playing the quarterback position. However, the combination of unreliable statistics in the early era of the NFL and the differences in the early quarterback position make tracking starts by quarterbacks impractical for this timeframe.

== Seasons ==
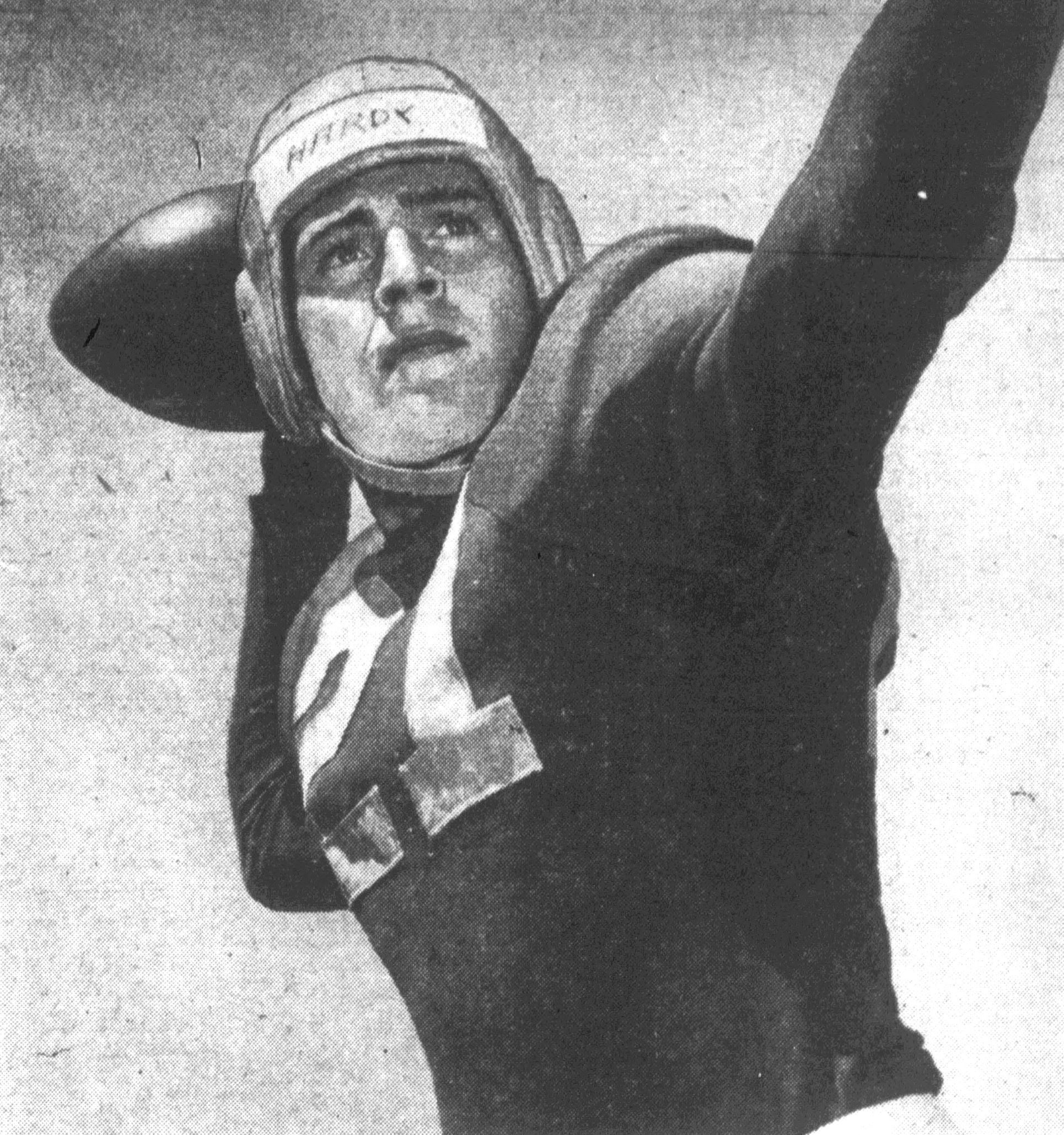
Jim Hardy (1950)

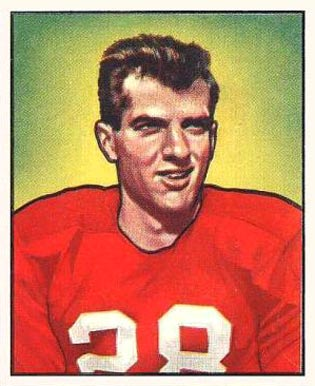
Frank Tripucka (1950–1952)

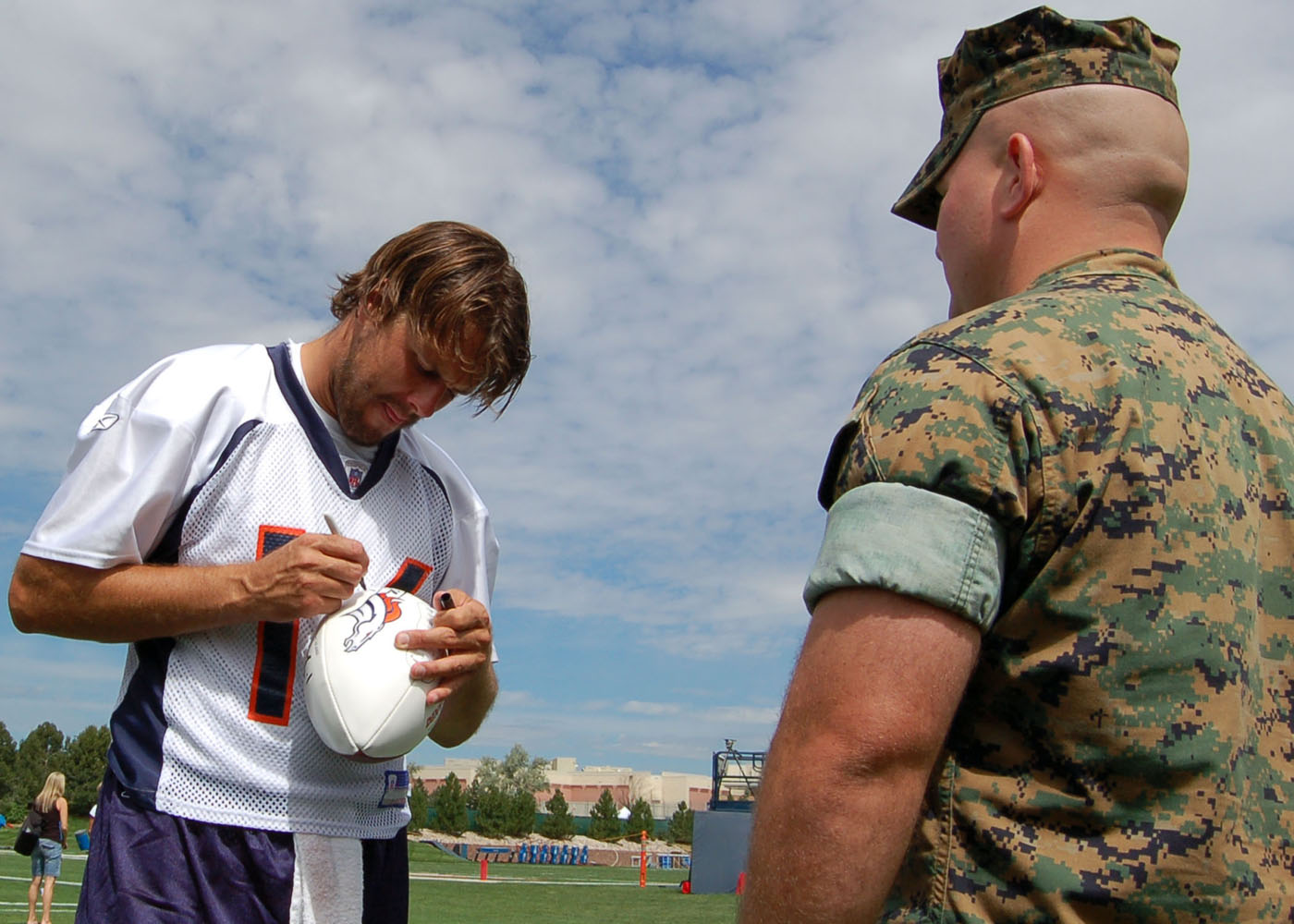
Jake Plummer (1997–2002)

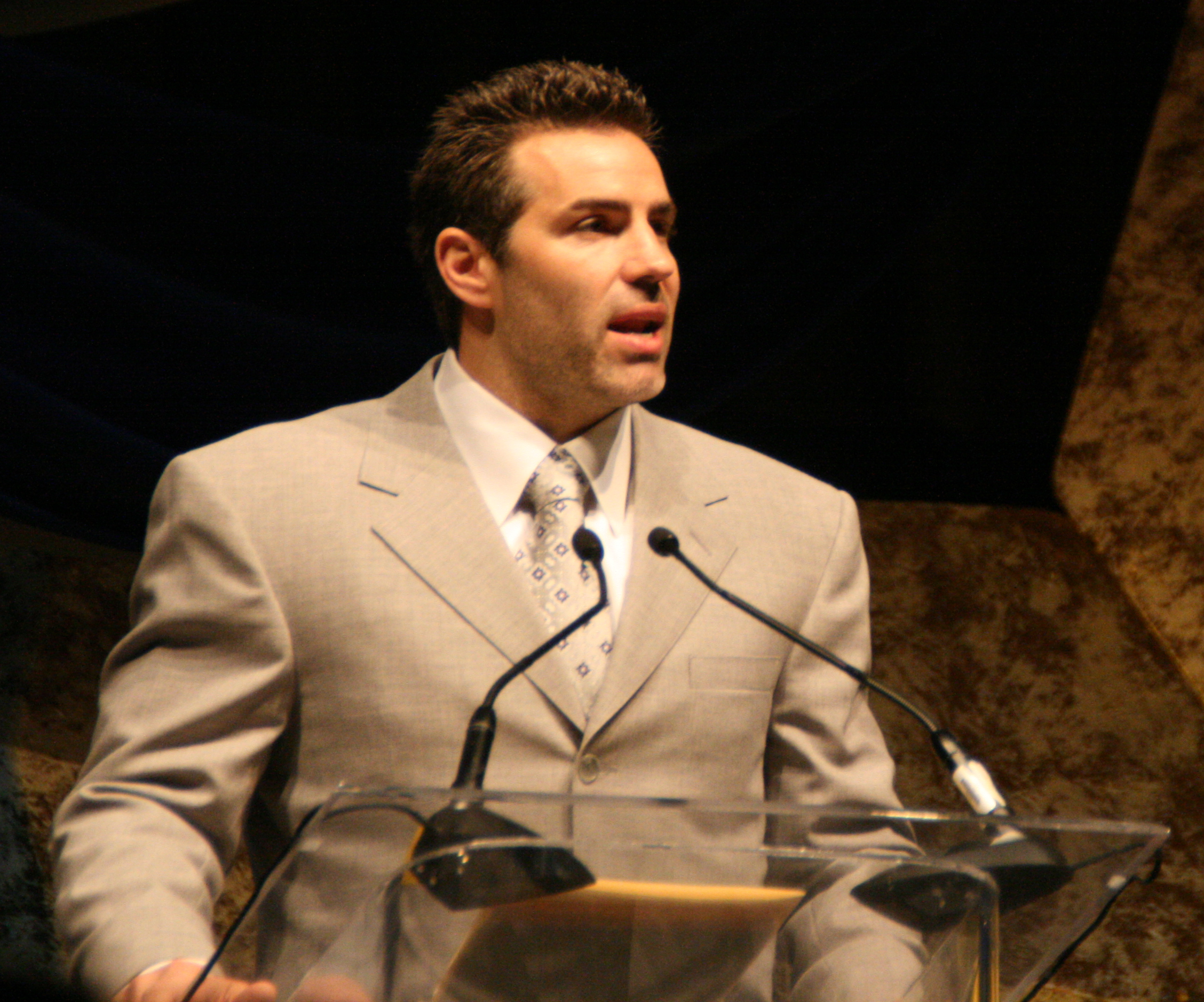
Kurt Warner (2005–2009)

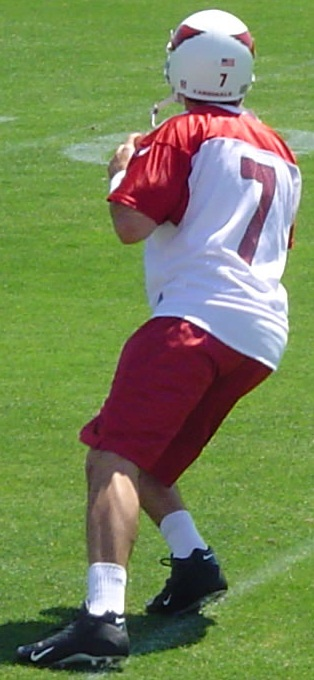
Matt Leinart (2006–2007, 2009)

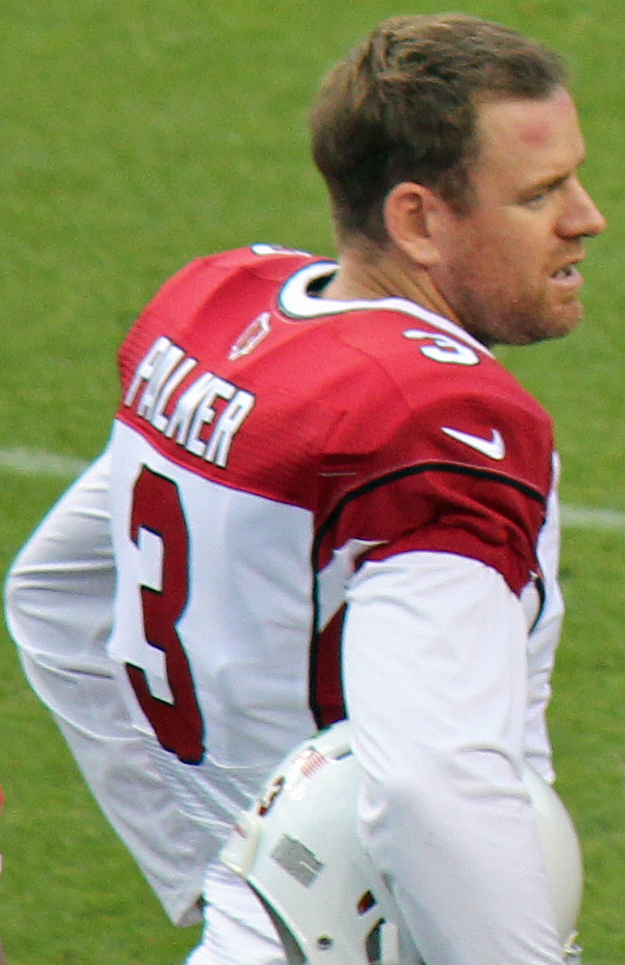
Carson Palmer (2013–2017)

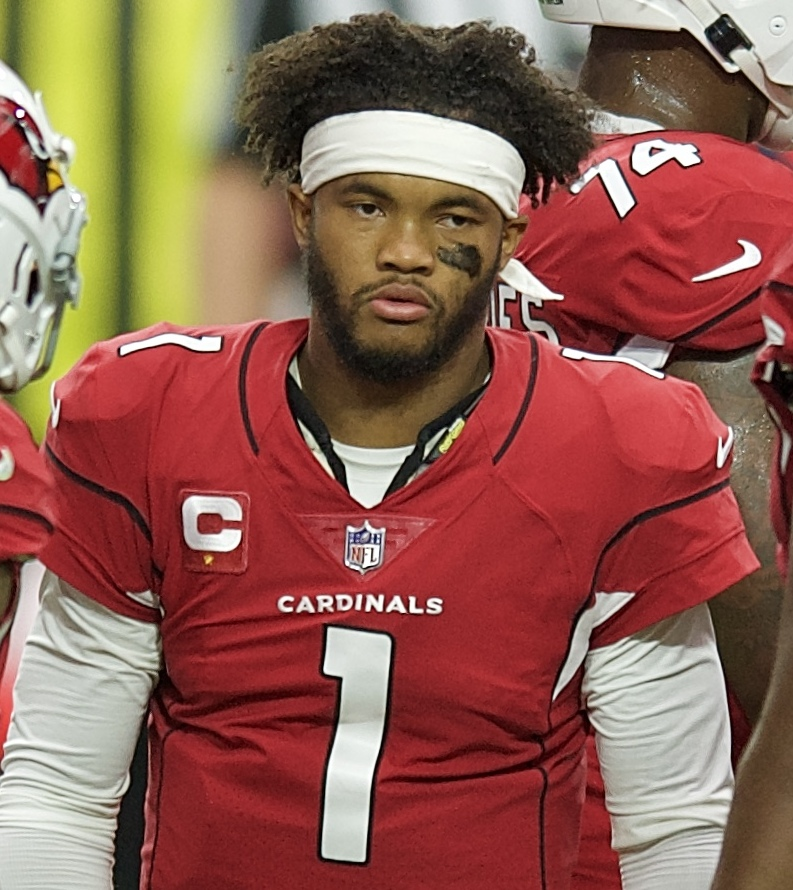
Kyler Murray (2019–2025)

The number of games they started during the season is listed in parentheses:

Season	Regular season	Postseason	References
Chicago Cardinals 1950–1959
1950	Jim Hardy (10) / Frank Tripucka (2)		
1951	Charley Trippi (6) / Jim Hardy (4) / Frank Tripucka (2)		
1952	Charley Trippi (10) / Don Panciera (1) / Frank Tripucka (1)		
1953	Jim Root (6) / Steve Romanik (4) / Ray Nagel (2)		
1954	Lamar McHan (11) / Steve Romanik (1)		
1955	Lamar McHan (11) / Ogden Compton (1)		
1956	Lamar McHan (10) / Jim Root (2)		
1957	Lamar McHan (12)		
1958	Lamar McHan (9) / M.C. Reynolds (3)		
1959	King Hill (11) / John Roach (1)		
St. Louis Cardinals 1960–1987
1960	John Roach (10) / King Hill (1) / George Izo (1)		
1961	Sam Etcheverry (7) / Ralph Guglielmi (7)		
1962	Charley Johnson (10) / Sam Etcheverry (4)		
1963	Charley Johnson (14)		
1964	Charley Johnson (14)		
1965	Charley Johnson (11) / Buddy Humphrey (3)		
1966	Charley Johnson (9) / Terry Nofsinger (5)		
1967	Jim Hart (14)		
1968	Jim Hart (12) / Charley Johnson (2)		
1969	Charley Johnson (9) / Jim Hart (5)		
1970	Jim Hart (14)		
1971	Jim Hart (9) / Pete Beathard (5)		
1972	Gary Cuozzo (6) / Tim Van Galder (5) / Jim Hart (2)		
1973	Jim Hart (12) / Gary Keithley (2)		
1974	Jim Hart (14)	Jim Hart (0–1)	
1975	Jim Hart (14)	Jim Hart (0–1)	
1976	Jim Hart (14)		
1977	Jim Hart (14)		
1978	Jim Hart (15) / Steve Pisarkiewicz (1)		
1979	Jim Hart (13) / Steve Pisarkiewicz (3)		
1980	Jim Hart (15) / Mike Loyd (1)		
1981	Jim Hart (9) / Neil Lomax (7)		
1982	Neil Lomax (9)	Neil Lomax (0–1)	
1983	Neil Lomax (13) / Jim Hart (3)		
1984	Neil Lomax (16)		
1985	Neil Lomax (16)		
1986	Neil Lomax (14) / Cliff Stoudt (2)		
1987	Neil Lomax (12) / Shawn Halloran (2) / Sammy Garza (1)		
Phoenix Cardinals 1988–1993
1988	Neil Lomax (14) / Cliff Stoudt (2)		
1989	Gary Hogeboom (13) / Tom Tupa (2) / Timm Rosenbach (1)		
1990	Timm Rosenbach (16)		
1991	Tom Tupa (11) / Stan Gelbaugh (3) / Chris Chandler (2)		
1992	Chris Chandler (13) / Timm Rosenbach (3)		
1993	Steve Beuerlein (14) / Chris Chandler (2)		
Arizona Cardinals 1994–present
1994	Jay Schroeder (8) / Steve Beuerlein (7) / Jim McMahon (1)		
1995	Dave Krieg (16)		
1996	Boomer Esiason (8) / Kent Graham (8)		
1997	Jake Plummer (9) / Kent Graham (6) / Stoney Case (1)		
1998	Jake Plummer (16)	Jake Plummer (1–1)	
1999	Jake Plummer (11) / Dave Brown (5)		
2000	Jake Plummer (14) / Dave Brown (2)		
2001	Jake Plummer (16)		
2002	Jake Plummer (16)		
2003	Jeff Blake (13) / Josh McCown (3)		
2004	Josh McCown (13) / Shaun King (2) / John Navarre (1)		
2005	Kurt Warner (10) / Josh McCown (6)		
2006	Matt Leinart (11) / Kurt Warner (5)		
2007	Kurt Warner (11) / Matt Leinart (5)		
2008	Kurt Warner (16)	Kurt Warner (3–1)	
2009	Kurt Warner (15) / Matt Leinart (1)	Kurt Warner (1–1)	
2010	Derek Anderson (9) / John Skelton (4) / Max Hall (3)		
2011	Kevin Kolb (9) / John Skelton (7)		
2012	John Skelton (6) / Kevin Kolb (5) / Ryan Lindley (4) / Brian Hoyer (1)		
2013	Carson Palmer (16)		
2014	Drew Stanton (8) / Carson Palmer (6) / Ryan Lindley (2)	Ryan Lindley (0–1)	
2015	Carson Palmer (16)	Carson Palmer (1–1)	
2016	Carson Palmer (15) / Drew Stanton (1)		
2017	Carson Palmer (7) / Blaine Gabbert (5) / Drew Stanton (4)		
2018	Josh Rosen (13) / Sam Bradford (3)		
2019	Kyler Murray (16)		
2020	Kyler Murray (16)		
2021	Kyler Murray (14) / Colt McCoy (3)	Kyler Murray (0–1)	
2022	Kyler Murray (11) / Colt McCoy (3) / David Blough (2) / Trace McSorley (1)		
2023	Kyler Murray (8) / Joshua Dobbs (8) / Clayton Tune (1)		
2024	Kyler Murray (17)		
2025	Jacoby Brissett (12) / Kyler Murray (5)		
2026	Jacoby Brissett (8) / Gardner Minshew (1) / Carson Beck (1)		

== Most games started ==
These quarterbacks have the most starts for the Cardinals in regular season games (through the 2025 NFL season).

	Name	Period	Starts	Wins	Losses	Ties	Win %
1	Jim Hart	1967–1983	180	87	88	5	.497
2	Neil Lomax	1982–1988	101	47	52	2	.475
3	Kyler Murray	2019–2025	87	38	48	1	.443
4	Jake Plummer	1997–2002	82	30	52	0	.366
5	Charley Johnson	1961–1969	69	36	28	5	.558
6	Carson Palmer	2013–2017	60	38	21	1	.633
7	Kurt Warner	2005–2009	58	27	30	0	.465

== Team career passing records ==
(Through the 2025 NFL season)

Name	Completions	Attempts	Completion %	Yards	Touchdowns	Interceptions	QB rating
Jim Hart	2,590	5,069	51.1	34,639	209	247	66.6
Neil Lomax	1,817	3,153	57.6	22,771	136	90	82.7
Kyler Murray	1,974	2,941	67.1	20,460	121	60	92.2
Jake Plummer	1,540	2,754	55.9	17,622	90	114	69.0
Carson Palmer	1,373	2,197	62.5	16,872	105	57	91.1
Kurt Warner	1,371	2,105	65.1	15,843	100	59	91.9
Charley Johnson	1,030	2,047	50.3	14,928	108	110	69.6
Paul Christman	453	1,014	44.7	6,749	51	69	55.5

== See also ==
- List of NFL starting quarterbacks
