= 1974 St. Louis Cardinals (NFL) season =

American football team season

1974 St. Louis Cardinals season
- Owner: Bill Bidwill
- Head coach: Don Coryell
- Home stadium: Busch Memorial Stadium

Results
- Record: 10–4
- Division place: 1st NFC East
- Playoffs: Lost Divisional Playoffs (at Vikings) 14–30
- Pro Bowlers: T Dan Dierdorf; QB Jim Hart; RB Terry Metcalf; WR Mel Gray; CB Roger Wehrli

The 1974 St. Louis Cardinals season was the team's 55th year with the National Football League and the 15th season in St. Louis. The Cardinals scored 285 points while the defense gave up 218 points, en route to the NFC East Championship.

The 10–4 Cardinals qualified for the postseason for the first time since 1948 when the franchise was based in Chicago. It was the team's first winning season since 1970 when the Cardinals went 8–5–1. Although the Cardinals and the Washington Redskins finished with identical 10–4 records, the Cardinals won the NFC East title, because of their two victories over Washington that season.

The Cardinals won their first seven games, and were at least tied for first place from Week One to the end of the regular season.

The Cardinals would not start a season with a 7–0 record again until 2021. By then, they would be based in Arizona.

== Offseason ==
=== NFL draft ===
1974 St. Louis Cardinals draft
Round	Pick	Player	Position	College	Notes
1	7	J. V. Cain	Tight end	Colorado	
2	33	Greg Kindle	Guard	Tennessee State	
3	60	Steve George	Defensive tackle	Houston	
4	85	Durwood Keeton	Defensive back	Oklahoma	Signed with Southern California Sun (WFL)
4	91	Ike Harris	Wide receiver	Iowa State	Played with Cardinals 75–77
5	111	Steve Neils	Linebacker	Minnesota	
8	189	Sergio Albert	Kicker	U.S. International	
9	215	Reggie Harrison	Running back	Cincinnati	
10	251	Greg Hartle	Linebacker	Newberry	
12	293	Roger Wallace	Wide receiver	Bowling Green	Signed with Memphis Grizzlies (WFL)
13	319	Jimmy Poulos	Running back	Georgia	Signed with Jacksonville Express (WFL)
14	345	Charles Smith	Running back	Yankton	
15	371	Vincent Ancell	Defensive back	Arkansas State	
16	397	Alonzo Emery	Running back	Arizona State	
17	423	John Moseley	Defensive back	Missouri	
Made roster

== Personnel ==
=== Staff / Coaches ===
1974 St. Louis Cardinals staff
Front office: Principal Owner/de facto General Manager - Bill Bidwill; Director of Pro Football Operations – Joe Sullivan; Head coaches: Head Coach – Don Coryell; Offensive coaches: Offensive Backs / Receivers – Joe Gibbs; Offensive line – Jim Hanifan	Defensive coaches: Defensive Coordinator / Secondary – Ray Willsey; Defensive Line / Linebackers – Sid Hall; Defensive Backs – Jim Champion; Special teams coaches: Special Assignments – Wayne Sevier

=== Roster ===
1974 St. Louis Cardinals roster
Quarterbacks: 17 Jim Hart; 12 Gary Keithley; 11 Dennis Shaw; Running backs: 44 Donny Anderson; 34 Steve Jones; 21 Terry Metcalf; 27 Eddie Moss; 35 Jim Otis; 20 Ken Willard; Wide receivers: 88 J. V. Cain; 85 Mel Gray; 30 Gary Hammond; 82 Earl Thomas; Tight ends: 80 Jim McFarland; 81 Jackie Smith	Offensive linemen: 51 Tom Brahaney C; 72 Dan Dierdorf T; 60 Conrad Dobler G; 60 Roger Finnie G; 69 Greg Kindle T; 73 Ernie McMillan T; 56 Cal Withrow C; 64 Bob Young G; Defensive linemen: 79 Bob Bell DE; 70 Leo Brooks DT; 65 Bob Crum DE; 63 Steve George DT; 75 Bob Rowe DT; 74 Council Rudolph DE; 78 Ron Yankowski DE	Linebackers: 57 Mark Arneson MLB; 59 Pete Barnes OLB; 50 Greg Hartle MLB; 52 Jack LeVeck OLB; 58 Terry Miller OLB; 53 Steve Neils OLB; 67 Larry Stallings OLB; Defensive backs: 26 Dwayne Crump CB; 41 Clarence Duren FS; 36 Ken Reaves SS; 38 Hurles Scales CB; 43 Norm Thompson CB; 45 Jim Tolbert SS; 22 Roger Wehrli CB; Special teams: 18 Sergio Albert K; 25 Jim Bakken K; 14 Hal Roberts P	Reserve lists: 54 Tom Banks C (IR); 33 Willie Belton RB (IR); 65 Dave Butz DT (IR); 28 Scott Stringer CB (IR); 40 Eric Washington CB (IR); rookies in italics

== Hall of Fame Game ==
- St. Louis Cardinals 21, Buffalo Bills 13

== Regular season ==
=== Schedule ===
Week	Date	Opponent	Result	Record	Venue	Attendance	Recap
1	September 15	**Philadelphia Eagles**	**W** 7–3	1–0	Busch Memorial Stadium	40,322	Recap
2	September 22	at **Washington Redskins**	**W** 17–10	2–0	RFK Stadium	53,888	Recap
3	September 29	Cleveland Browns	**W** 29–7	3–0	Busch Memorial Stadium	43,472	Recap
4	October 6	at San Francisco 49ers	**W** 34–9	4–0	Candlestick Park	48,675	Recap
5	October 13	**Dallas Cowboys**	**W** 31–28	5–0	Busch Memorial Stadium	49,885	Recap
6	October 20	at Houston Oilers	**W** 31–27	6–0	Astrodome	26,371	Recap
7	October 27	**Washington Redskins**	**W** 23–20	7–0	Busch Memorial Stadium	49,410	Recap
8	November 3	at **Dallas Cowboys**	**L** 14–17	7–1	Texas Stadium	64,146	Recap
9	November 11	Minnesota Vikings	**L** 24–28	7–2	Busch Memorial Stadium	50,183	Recap
10	November 17	at **Philadelphia Eagles**	**W** 13–3	8–2	Veterans Stadium	61,982	Recap
11	November 24	at **New York Giants**	**W** 23–21	9–2	Yale Bowl	40,615	Recap
12	December 1	Kansas City Chiefs	**L** 13–17	9–3	Busch Memorial Stadium	41,863	Recap
13	December 8	at New Orleans Saints	**L** 0–14	9–4	Tulane Stadium	57,152	Recap
14	December 15	**New York Giants**	**W** 26–14	10–4	Busch Memorial Stadium	47,414	Recap
Note: Intra-division opponents are in **bold** text.

=== Game summaries ===
==== Week 11 at Giants ====
St. Louis Cardinals (8–2) at New York Giants (2–8)

Quarter	1	2	3	4	Total
Cardinals	6	0	7	10	**23**
Giants	0	7	7	7	**21**

at Yale Bowl • New Haven, Connecticut

- Date: November 24
- Game time: 1:00 p.m.
- Game weather: 45 °F (7 °C) • Wind 9 miles per hour (14 km/h; 7.8 kn)
- Game attendance: 40,615
- Referee: Bob Frederic
- TV: CBS
- Pro-Football-Reference.com

Game information

Cardinals

- Jim Hart
  25/42, 259 Yds, 2 TD
- Terry Metcalf
  15 Rush, 48 Yds
- Mel Gray
  5 Rec, 102 Yds, TD

Giants

- Craig Morton
  21/35, 257 Yds, 2 TD, INT
- Joe Dawkins
  12 Rush, 65 Yds
- Bob Tucker
  5 Rec, 69 Yds, TD

Scoring summary

Quarter	Time	Drive			Team	Scoring information	Score	
Quarter	Time	Plays	Yards	TOP	Team	Scoring information	STL	NYG
1					Cardinals	36-yard field goal by Jim Bakken	3	0
2					Cardinals	32-yard field goal by Jim Bakken	6	0
2					Giants	Ron Johnson 2-yard touchdown run, Pete Gogolak kick good	6	7
3					Giants	Bob Tucker 29-yard touchdown reception from Craig Morton, Pete Gogolak kick good	6	14
3					Cardinals	Earl Thomas 16-yard touchdown reception from Jim Hart, Jim Bakken kick good	13	14
4					Cardinals	Mel Gray 45-yard touchdown reception from Jim Hart, Jim Bakken kick good	20	14
4					Giants	Walker Gillette 17-yard touchdown reception from Craig Morton, Pete Gogolak kick good	20	21
4					Cardinals	36-yard field goal by Jim Bakken	23	21
"TOP" = time of possession. For other American football terms, see Glossary of American football.							23	21

==== Week 14 ====
Team	1	2	3	4	Total
Giants	0	14	0	0	14
• Cardinals	0	0	20	6	26

- Date: December 15
- Location: Busch Stadium, St. Louis, Missouri
- Game start: 1:00 p.m.
- Game weather: 41 °F (5 °C), wind 14 miles per hour (23 km/h; 12 kn)

Scoring summary
2	NYG	Ron Johnson 2 yard run (Pete Gogolak kick)	Giants 7–0
2	NYG	Joe Dawkins 1 yard run (Pete Gogolak kick)	Giants 14–0
3	STL	Ken Willard 4 yard pass from Jim Hart (kick failed)	Giants 14–6
3	STL	Jackie Smith 28 yard pass from Jim Hart (Jim Bakken kick)	Giants 14–13
3	STL	Terry Metcalf 1 yard run (Jim Bakken kick)	Cardinals 20–14
4	STL	Terry Metcalf 16 yard run (kick failed)	Cardinals 26–14

With the win, the Cardinals clinched both the NFC East and their first playoff berth since 1948, snapping a 25-year playoff drought (ironically one started and ended three years after Washington's 25-year playoff drought).

=== Standings ===
NFC East
	W	L	T	PCT	DIV	CONF	PF	PA	STK
St. Louis Cardinals	10	4	0	.714	7–1	8–3	285	218	W1
Washington Redskins	10	4	0	.714	5–3	8–3	320	196	W2
Dallas Cowboys	8	6	0	.571	4–4	6–5	297	235	L1
Philadelphia Eagles	7	7	0	.500	3–5	5–6	242	217	W3
New York Giants	2	12	0	.143	1–7	1–10	195	299	L6

== Postseason ==
=== NFC Divisional Playoff ===
- Minnesota Vikings 30, St. Louis Cardinals 14

	1	2	3	4	Total
Cardinals	0	7	0	7	14
Vikings	0	7	16	7	30

at Metropolitan Stadium, Bloomington, Minnesota

- TV: CBS
- Attendance: 44,626

== Awards and records ==
- Jim Hart, NFC Leader, Touchdown Passes, 20 Passes

=== Milestones ===
- Terry Metcalf, 2000 Combined Net Yards (718 Rush Yards, 377 Pass Receiving Yards, 340 Punt Return Yards, 623 Kick Return Yards)
