= 1975 St. Louis Cardinals (NFL) season =

American football team season

1975 St. Louis Cardinals season
- Owner: Bill Bidwill
- Head coach: Don Coryell
- Home stadium: Busch Memorial Stadium

Results
- Record: 11–3
- Division place: 1st NFC East
- Playoffs: Lost Divisional Playoffs (at Rams) 23–35
- Pro Bowlers: C Tom Banks; G Conrad Dobler; T Dan Dierdorf; QB Jim Hart; RB Terry Metcalf; RB Jim Otis; RB Mel Gray; CB Roger Wehrli; K Jim Bakken

The 1975 St. Louis Cardinals season was the team's 56th year with the National Football League and the 16th season in St. Louis. The club scored 356 points while the defense gave up 276 points. The team appeared in the playoffs for the second consecutive year, by winning the NFC East with a record of eleven wins and three losses (the best finish in the Coryell era). They never returned to the playoffs during a full NFL season until 1998, by which time they moved from St. Louis to Arizona.

The team was nicknamed the “Cardiac Cards”, because eight of their games were decided in the final minute of play; the Cardinals went 7–1 in these games.

After this season, the Cardinals never reached the top of the NFC East again. They would not again have a division title until 33 years later, when they played in Super Bowl XLIII after they had moved to Arizona, as well as to the NFC West.

== Offseason ==
=== NFL draft ===
1975 St. Louis Cardinals draft
Round	Pick	Player	Position	College	Notes
1	21	Tim Gray	Safety	Texas A&M	
2	46	Jim Germany	Running back	New Mexico State	
5	124	Harvey Goodman	Offensive tackle	Colorado	
6	152	Larry Jameson	Defensive tackle	Indiana	
7	177	Steve Beaird	Running back	Baylor	
8	188	John Adams	Defensive tackle	West Virginia	
8	202	Louis Lauriano	Defensive back	Long Beach State	
10	255	Mike McGraw	Linebacker	Wyoming	
11	280	Jerry Latin	Running back	Northern Illinois	
12	308	Ben Jones	Wide receiver	LSU	
13	333	Steve Lindgren	Defensive end	Hamline	
14	358	Ritch Bahe	Wide receiver	Nebraska	
15	386	Ron Franklin	Defensive tackle	Boise State	
16	411	Mark Miller	Wide receiver	Missouri	
17	436	Ken Monroe	Running back	Indiana State	
Made roster

== Personnel ==
=== Staff / Coaches ===
1975 St. Louis Cardinals staff
Front office: Principal Owner/de facto General Manager - Bill Bidwill; Director of Pro Football Operations – Joe Sullivan; Head coaches: Head Coach – Don Coryell; Offensive coaches: Quarterbacks / Receivers Coach - Harry Gilmer; Offensive Backs – Joe Gibbs; Offensive line – Jim Hanifan	Defensive coaches: Defensive Coordinator / Secondary – Ray Willsey; Defensive Line / Linebackers – Sid Hall; Defensive Backs = Jim Champion; Special teams coaches: Special Assignments - Wayne Seiver

=== Roster ===
1975 St. Louis Cardinals roster
Quarterbacks: 17 Jim Hart; 12 Gary Keithley; 11 Dennis Shaw; Running backs: 31 Josh Ashton; 34 Steve Jones; 32 Jerry Latin; 21 Terry Metcalf; 35 Jim Otis; Wide receivers: 85 Mel Gray; 30 Gary Hammond; 84 Ike Harris; 82 Earl Thomas; Tight ends: 88 J. V. Cain; 81 Jackie Smith	Offensive linemen: 61 Hank Allison T/G; 54 Tom Banks C; 51 Tom Brahaney C; 72 Dan Dierdorf T; 66 Conrad Dobler G; 60 Roger Finnie T; 69 Greg Kindle G/T; 64 Bob Young G; Defensive linemen: 79 Bob Bell DE; 70 Leo Brooks DT; 76 Charlie Davis DT; 75 Bob Rowe DT; 74 Council Rudolph DE; 78 Ron Yankowski DE	Linebackers: 57 Mark Arneson MLB; 59 Pete Barnes OLB; 50 Greg Hartle MLB; 53 Steve Neils OLB; 67 Larry Stallings OLB; 55 Ray White OLB; Defensive backs: 26 Dwayne Crump SS; 41 Clarence Duren FS; 33 Tim Gray CB; 36 Ken Reaves SS; 43 Norm Thompson CB; 45 Jim Tolbert CB/S; 22 Roger Wehrli CB; Special teams: 25 Jim Bakken K; 80 Jeff West P	Reserve lists: 68 John Adams DT (PUP); 65 Bob Crum DE (DNR); 63 Steve George DT (IR); 58 Terry Miller LB (IR); 27 Eddie Moss RB (IR); rookies in italics

== Regular season ==
=== Schedule ===
Week	Date	Opponent	Result	Record	Venue	Attendance
1	September 21	Atlanta Falcons	**W** 23–20	1–0	Busch Memorial Stadium	42,172
2	September 28	at **Dallas Cowboys**	**L** 31–37 (OT)	1–1	Texas Stadium	52,417
3	October 5	**New York Giants**	**W** 26–14	2–1	Busch Memorial Stadium	44,919
4	October 13	at **Washington Redskins**	**L** 17–27	2–2	RFK Stadium	54,693
5	October 19	**Philadelphia Eagles**	**W** 31–20	3–2	Busch Memorial Stadium	45,242
6	October 25	at **New York Giants**	**W** 20–13	4–2	Shea Stadium	49,598
7	November 2	New England Patriots	**W** 24–17	5–2	Busch Memorial Stadium	45,907
8	November 9	at **Philadelphia Eagles**	**W** 24–23	6–2	Veterans Stadium	60,277
9	November 16	**Washington Redskins**	**W** 20–17 (OT)	7–2	Busch Memorial Stadium	49,919
10	November 23	at New York Jets	**W** 37–6	8–2	Shea Stadium	53,169
11	November 27	Buffalo Bills	**L** 14–32	8–3	Busch Memorial Stadium	41,899
12	December 7	**Dallas Cowboys**	**W** 31–17	9–3	Busch Memorial Stadium	49,701
13	December 14	at Chicago Bears	**W** 34–20	10–3	Soldier Field	35,052
14	December 21	at Detroit Lions	**W** 24–13	11–3	Pontiac Municipal Stadium	64,656
Note: Intra-division opponents are in **bold** text.

=== Standings ===
NFC East
	W	L	T	PCT	DIV	CONF	PF	PA	STK
^{(3)} St. Louis Cardinals	11	3	0	.786	6–2	9–2	356	276	W3
^{(4)} Dallas Cowboys	10	4	0	.714	6–2	8–3	350	268	W2
Washington Redskins	8	6	0	.571	4–4	7–4	325	276	L2
New York Giants	5	9	0	.357	1–7	3–8	216	306	W2
Philadelphia Eagles	4	10	0	.286	3–5	4–7	225	302	W1

=== Game summaries ===
==== Week 1: vs. Atlanta Falcons ====
Quarter	1	2	3	4	Total
Falcons	7	6	7	0	**20**
**Cardinals**	7	6	0	10	**23**

at Busch Stadium, St. Louis, Missouri

- Date: Sunday, September 21
- Game time: 1:00 p.m.
- Game weather: 54 °F (12.2 °C), wind 10 miles per hour (16 km/h; 8.7 kn)
- Pro-Football-Reference.com

Game information

**First quarter**

- STL – Terry Metcalf 39-yard run (Jim Bakken kick) – **Cardinals 7–0**
- ATL – Steve Bartkowski 1-yard run (Nick Mike-Mayer kick) – **Tied 7–7**

**Second quarter**

- STL – Jim Bakken 22-yard field goal – **Cardinals 10–7**
- ATL – Dave Hampton 6-yard run (kick failed) – **Falcons 13–10**
- STL – Jim Bakken 39-yard field goal – **Tied 13–13**

**Third quarter**

- ATL – Dave Hampton 1-yard run (Nick Mike-Mayer kick) – **Falcons 20–13**

**Fourth quarter**

- STL – Earl Thomas 8-yard pass from Jim Hart (Jim Bakken kick) – **Tied 20–20**
- STL – Jim Bakken 25-yard field goal – **Cardinals 23–20**

**Falcons**

- Steve Bartkowski
  8/16, 81 Yds, INT
- Dave Hampton
  23 Rush, 135 Yds, 2 TD
- Woody Thompson
  3 Rec, 29 Yds

**Cardinals**

- Jim Hart
  12/23, 150 Yds, TD, 2 INT
- Terry Metcalf
  20 Rush, 99 Yds, TD
- Mel Gray
  3 Rec, 65 Yds

== Postseason ==
=== NFC Divisional Playoff ===
Quarter	1	2	3	4	Total
Cardinals	0	9	7	7	23
Rams	14	14	0	7	35

at Los Angeles Memorial Coliseum, Los Angeles, California

- Date: December 27, 1975
- Game attendance: 72,650
- Referee: Dick Jorgensen
- TV announcers (CBS): Frank Glieber and Hank Stram

== Awards and records ==
- Terry Metcalf, NFL Leader, 2,462 Combined Net Yards

=== Milestones ===
- Terry Metcalf, Second Consecutive 2000 Combined Net Yards Season (816 Rush Yards, 378 Pass Receiving Yards, 285 Punt Return Yards, 960 Kick Return Yards, 23 fumble return yards)
