= List of Arizona Cardinals seasons =

This is a list of seasons completed by the Arizona Cardinals. The Cardinals are an American football franchise competing as a member of the West division of the National Football Conference (NFC) in the National Football League (NFL).

The Cardinals were founded in 1898 in Chicago as an amateur team, the Morgan Athletic Club. They became the Racine Street Normals shortly afterward. In 1901, owner Chris O'Brien acquired some used jerseys from the University of Chicago for the Normals. O'Brien believed that the jerseys had faded so much that they were more cardinal red than maroon, and changed the team's name to the Racine Cardinals. The team disbanded in 1906, but were refounded in 1913. The team did not play in 1918 due to World War I, but were refounded after the Armistice and have played continuously ever since. The team was a charter member of the American Professional Football Association, forerunner of the NFL, in 1920. To avoid confusion with a team from Racine, Wisconsin who joined the renamed NFL in 1922, the team changed its name to the Chicago Cardinals. The team moved to St. Louis, Missouri as the St. Louis Cardinals in 1960, then to their current home of Phoenix, Arizona in 1988. After playing as the Phoenix Cardinals from 1988 to 1993, the team took its current name in 1994.

The Cardinals and Chicago Bears are the only two charter members of the NFL still playing in the league today. Through the heritage of the Morgan Athletic Club, the Cardinals also claim to be the oldest professional football team in the country.

The list documents the season-by-season records of the Cardinals' franchise from 1920 to present, including postseason records, and league awards for individual players or head coaches.

== Legend ==
(#)	The order of league championship won by the franchise
Finish	Final position in league, division, or conference
T-#	Finished tied in that position with one or more teams
W	Wins
L	Losses
T	Ties
MVP	National Football League Most Valuable Player Award
COY	National Football League Coach of the Year Award
SB MVP	Super Bowl Most Valuable Player Award
OPOY	National Football League Offensive Player of the Year Award
DPOY	National Football League Defensive Player of the Year Award
OROY	National Football League Offensive Rookie of the Year Award
DROY	National Football League Defensive Rookie of the Year Award
WP MOY	Walter Payton Man of the Year Award

== Seasons ==
Table legend
NFL champions (1920–1969) †	Super Bowl champions (1966–present) ‡	Conference champions ^{*}	Division champions ^{^}	Wild card berth ^{#}	One-game playoff berth ^{+}

Arizona Cardinals seasonal records
Season	Team	League	Conference	Division	Regular season				Postseason results	Awards	Head coach	Refs.
Season	Team	League	Conference	Division	Finish	W	L	T	Postseason results	Awards	Head coach	Refs.
Racine / Chicago Cardinals
1920	1920	APFA			4th	6	2	2	The APFA/NFL did not hold playoff games until 1933		Paddy Driscoll	
1921	1921	APFA			9th	3	3	2	The APFA/NFL did not hold playoff games until 1933		Paddy Driscoll	
1922	1922	NFL			3rd	8	3	0	The APFA/NFL did not hold playoff games until 1933		Paddy Driscoll	
1923	1923	NFL			6th	8	4	0	The APFA/NFL did not hold playoff games until 1933		Arnold Horween	
1924	1924	NFL			8th	5	4	1	The APFA/NFL did not hold playoff games until 1933		Arnold Horween	
1925	1925	NFL			1st	11	2	1	Named NFL Champions (1)		Norman Barry	
1926	1926	NFL			10th	5	6	1	The APFA/NFL did not hold playoff games until 1933		Norman Barry	
1927	1927	NFL			9th	3	7	1	The APFA/NFL did not hold playoff games until 1933		Guy Chamberlin	
1928	1928	NFL			9th	1	5	0	The APFA/NFL did not hold playoff games until 1933		Fred Gillies	
1929	1929	NFL			4th	6	6	1	The APFA/NFL did not hold playoff games until 1933		Dewey Scanlon	
1930	1930	NFL			7th	5	6	2	The APFA/NFL did not hold playoff games until 1933		Ernie Nevers	
1931	1931	NFL			4th	5	4	0	The APFA/NFL did not hold playoff games until 1933		Ernie Nevers (5–3) LeRoy Andrews (0–1)	
1932	1932	NFL			7th	2	6	2			Jack Chevigny	
1933	1933	NFL		Western	5th	1	9	1			Paul J. Schissler	
1934	1934	NFL		Western	4th	5	6	0			Paul J. Schissler	
1935	1935	NFL		Western	T-3rd	6	4	2			Milan Creighton	
1936	1936	NFL		Western	4th	3	8	1			Milan Creighton	
1937	1937	NFL		Western	4th	5	5	1			Milan Creighton	
1938	1938	NFL		Western	5th	2	9	0			Milan Creighton	
1939	1939	NFL		Western	5th	1	10	0			Ernie Nevers	
1940	1940	NFL		Western	5th	2	7	2			Jimmy Conzelman	
1941	1941	NFL		Western	4th	3	7	1			Jimmy Conzelman	
1942	1942	NFL		Western	4th	3	8	0			Jimmy Conzelman	
1943	1943	NFL		Western	4th	0	10	0			Phil Handler	
Card-Pitt
1944	1944	NFL		Western	5th	0	10	0			Phil Handler & Walt Kiesling	
Chicago Cardinals
1945	1945	NFL		Western	5th	1	9	0			Phil Handler	
1946	1946	NFL		Western	T-3rd	6	5	0			Jimmy Conzelman	
1947	1947	NFL		Western	1st	9	3	0	Won NFL Championship (2) (Eagles) 28–21	Jimmy Conzelman (COY)	Jimmy Conzelman	
1948	1948	NFL		Western	1st	11	1	0	Lost NFL Championship (at Eagles) 0–7	Pat Harder (MVP)	Jimmy Conzelman	
1949	1949	NFL		Western	3rd	6	5	1			Phil Handler & Buddy Parker	
1950	1950	NFL	American		5th	5	7	0			Curly Lambeau	
1951	1951	NFL	American		6th	3	9	0			Curly Lambeau (2–8) Phil Handler & Cecil Isbell (1–1)	
1952	1952	NFL	American		T-5th	4	8	0			Joe Kuharich	
1953	1953	NFL	Eastern		6th	1	10	1			Joe Stydahar	
1954	1954	NFL	Eastern		6th	2	10	0			Joe Stydahar	
1955	1955	NFL	Eastern		T-4th	4	7	1			Ray Richards	
1956	1956	NFL	Eastern		2nd	7	5	0			Ray Richards	
1957	1957	NFL	Eastern		6th	3	9	0			Ray Richards	
1958	1958	NFL	Eastern		T-5th	2	9	1			Pop Ivy	
1959	1959	NFL	Eastern		6th	2	10	0			Pop Ivy	
St. Louis Cardinals
1960	1960	NFL	Eastern		4th	6	5	1			Pop Ivy	
1961	1961	NFL	Eastern		4th	7	7	0			Pop Ivy (5–7) Ray Willsey & Ray Prochaska & Chuck Drulis (2–0)	
1962	1962	NFL	Eastern		6th	4	9	1			Wally Lemm	
1963	1963	NFL	Eastern		3rd	9	5	0			Wally Lemm	
1964	1964	NFL	Eastern		2nd	9	3	2	Won Playoff Bowl (vs. Packers) 24–17		Wally Lemm	
1965	1965	NFL	Eastern		T-5th	5	9	0			Wally Lemm	
1966	1966	NFL	Eastern		4th	8	5	1			Charley Winner	
1967	1967	NFL	Eastern	Century	3rd	6	7	1			Charley Winner	
1968	1968	NFL	Eastern	Century	2nd	9	4	1			Charley Winner	
1969	1969	NFL	Eastern	Century	3rd	4	9	1			Charley Winner	
1970	1970	NFL	NFC	East	3rd	8	5	1			Charley Winner	
1971	1971	NFL	NFC	East	4th	4	9	1			Bob Hollway	
1972	1972	NFL	NFC	East	4th	4	9	1			Bob Hollway	
1973	1973	NFL	NFC	East	4th	4	9	1			Don Coryell	
1974	1974	NFL	NFC	East	1st	10	4	0	Lost Divisional playoffs (at Vikings) 14–30	Don Coryell (COY)	Don Coryell	
1975	1975	NFL	NFC	East	1st	11	3	0	Lost Divisional playoffs (at Rams) 23–35		Don Coryell	
1976	1976	NFL	NFC	East	3rd	10	4	0			Don Coryell	
1977	1977	NFL	NFC	East	3rd	7	7	0			Don Coryell	
1978	1978	NFL	NFC	East	4th	6	10	0			Bud Wilkinson	
1979	1979	NFL	NFC	East	5th	5	11	0		Ottis Anderson (OROY)	Bud Wilkinson (3–10) Larry Wilson (2–1)	
1980	1980	NFL	NFC	East	4th	5	11	0			Jim Hanifan	
1981	1981	NFL	NFC	East	5th	7	9	0			Jim Hanifan	
1982	1982	NFL	NFC		6th	5	4	0	Lost First Round playoffs (at Packers) 16–41		Jim Hanifan	
1983	1983	NFL	NFC	East	3rd	8	7	1			Jim Hanifan	
1984	1984	NFL	NFC	East	3rd	9	7	0			Jim Hanifan	
1985	1985	NFL	NFC	East	5th	5	11	0			Jim Hanifan	
1986	1986	NFL	NFC	East	5th	4	11	1			Gene Stallings	
1987	1987	NFL	NFC	East	3rd	7	8	0			Gene Stallings	
Phoenix Cardinals
1988	1988	NFL	NFC	East	4th	7	9	0			Gene Stallings	
1989	1989	NFL	NFC	East	4th	5	11	0			Gene Stallings (5–6) Hank Kuhlmann (0–5)	
1990	1990	NFL	NFC	East	5th	5	11	0			Joe Bugel	
1991	1991	NFL	NFC	East	5th	4	12	0			Joe Bugel	
1992	1992	NFL	NFC	East	5th	4	12	0			Joe Bugel	
1993	1993	NFL	NFC	East	4th	7	9	0			Joe Bugel	
Arizona Cardinals
1994	1994	NFL	NFC	East	3rd	8	8	0			Buddy Ryan	
1995	1995	NFL	NFC	East	5th	4	12	0			Buddy Ryan	
1996	1996	NFL	NFC	East	4th	7	9	0		Simeon Rice (DROY)	Vince Tobin	
1997	1997	NFL	NFC	East	5th	4	12	0			Vince Tobin	
1998	1998	NFL	NFC	East	2nd	9	7	0	Won Wild Card playoffs (at Cowboys) 20–7; Lost Divisional playoffs (at Vikings) 21–41		Vince Tobin	
1999	1999	NFL	NFC	East	4th	6	10	0			Vince Tobin	
2000	2000	NFL	NFC	East	5th	3	13	0			Vince Tobin (2–5) Dave McGinnis (1–8)	
2001	2001	NFL	NFC	East	4th	7	9	0			Dave McGinnis	
2002	2002	NFL	NFC	West	4th	5	11	0			Dave McGinnis	
2003	2003	NFL	NFC	West	4th	4	12	0		Anquan Boldin (OROY)	Dave McGinnis	
2004	2004	NFL	NFC	West	3rd	6	10	0			Dennis Green	
2005	2005	NFL	NFC	West	3rd	5	11	0			Dennis Green	
2006	2006	NFL	NFC	West	4th	5	11	0			Dennis Green	
2007	2007	NFL	NFC	West	2nd	8	8	0			Ken Whisenhunt	
2008	2008	NFL	NFC	West	1st	9	7	0	Won Wild Card playoffs (Falcons) 30–24; Won Divisional playoffs (at Panthers) 33–13; Won NFC Championship (Eagles) 32–25; Lost Super Bowl XLIII (vs. Steelers) 23–27	Kurt Warner (WP MOY)	Ken Whisenhunt	
2009	2009	NFL	NFC	West	1st	10	6	0	Won Wild Card playoffs (Packers) 51–45 (OT); Lost Divisional playoffs (at Saints) 14–45		Ken Whisenhunt	
2010	2010	NFL	NFC	West	4th	5	11	0			Ken Whisenhunt	
2011	2011	NFL	NFC	West	2nd	8	8	0			Ken Whisenhunt	
2012	2012	NFL	NFC	West	4th	5	11	0			Ken Whisenhunt	
2013	2013	NFL	NFC	West	3rd	10	6	0			Bruce Arians	
2014	2014	NFL	NFC	West	2nd	11	5	0	Lost Wild Card playoffs (at Panthers) 16–27	Bruce Arians (COY)	Bruce Arians	
2015	2015	NFL	NFC	West	1st	13	3	0	Won Divisional playoffs (Packers) 26–20 (OT); Lost NFC Championship (at Panthers) 15–49		Bruce Arians	
2016	2016	NFL	NFC	West	2nd	7	8	1		Larry Fitzgerald (WP MOY)	Bruce Arians	
2017	2017	NFL	NFC	West	3rd	8	8	0			Bruce Arians	
2018	2018	NFL	NFC	West	4th	3	13	0			Steve Wilks	
2019	2019	NFL	NFC	West	4th	5	10	1		Kyler Murray (OROY)	Kliff Kingsbury	
2020	2020	NFL	NFC	West	3rd	8	8	0			Kliff Kingsbury	
2021	2021	NFL	NFC	West	2nd	11	6	0	Lost Wild Card playoffs (at Rams) 11–34		Kliff Kingsbury	
2022	2022	NFL	NFC	West	4th	4	13	0			Kliff Kingsbury	
2023	2023	NFL	NFC	West	4th	4	13	0			Jonathan Gannon	
2024	2024	NFL	NFC	West	3rd	8	9	0			Jonathan Gannon	
2025	2025	NFL	NFC	West	4th	3	14	0			Jonathan Gannon	
Totals						165	248	25	Chicago Cardinals regular season record (1920–1943; 1945–1959)			
Totals						0	10	0	Card-Pitt regular season record (1944)			
Totals						186	202	14	St. Louis Cardinals regular season record (1960–1987)			
Totals						32	64	0	Phoenix Cardinals regular season record (1988–1993)			
Totals						213	302	2	Arizona Cardinals regular season record (1994–2025)			
Totals						596	826	41	All-time regular season record (1920–2025)			
Totals						7	10	—	All-time postseason record (1932–2025)			
Totals						603	836	41	All-time regular season and postseason record (1920–2025)			
Totals						2 NFL Championships, 1 Conference Championship, 7 Division Championships						
