= Sergio Albert =

Mexican gridiron football player (born 1951)

No. 18
- Position: Placekicker

Personal information
- Born: October 28, 1951 (age 75); Mexico City, Mexico
- Listed height: 6 ft 3 in (1.91 m)
- Listed weight: 195 lb (88 kg)

Career information
- High school: Mexico City
- College: USIU
- NFL draft: 1974: 8th round, 189th overall pick

Career history
- St. Louis Cardinals (1974); Chicago Bears (1975)*; San Diego Chargers (1976)*; Tampa Bay Buccaneers (1977)*; New York Giants (1977)*
- * Offseason or practice squad member only

Career NFL statistics
- Games played: 12
- Stats at Pro Football Reference

Sergio Albert (born October 28, 1951) is a Mexican former American football placekicker who played one season with the St. Louis Cardinals of the National Football League (NFL). He played college football at U.S. International University.

== Early life ==
Albert attended high school in Mexico City, Mexico. He first enrolled at Universidad Anáhuac México Norte for 2 years, before accepting a soccer scholarship from the U.S. International University in 1972.

In the fall of 1972, he would walk on to the football team after a tryout as a soccer-style placekicker. Because he was primarily a soccer player, he appeared in only 3 football games that season. In 1973, he appeared in 10 games but had few kicking opportunities, although he made a 54-yard field goal.

== Professional career ==
Albert was selected by the St. Louis Cardinals in the eighth round (189th overall) of the 1974 NFL draft. He is distinguished as being the third Mexican born player to be drafted into the National Football League (Tom Fears and Efren Herrera were the first ones). The Dallas Cowboys tried to sign him as an undrafted free agent in 1973, but the league did not allow the transaction.

He became a part of the team, after the Cardinals made the unusual move of keeping 2 kickers on the roster, while also choosing him over fellow rookie and ex-soccer player Pat Leahy. He was a kickoff specialist and a backup to Jim Bakken, until being waived on August 13, 1975.

On August 13, 1975, he was claimed off waivers by the Chicago Bears, but was released 5 days later.

On April 22, 1976, he was signed by the San Diego Chargers. During preseason, he participated in the first ever NFL game to be played outside of the United States and that was held in Japan. He was waived on September 6.

On April 7, 1977, he was signed as a free agent by the Tampa Bay Buccaneers. He was cut on June 8.

In June 1977, he signed with the New York Giants and was released on August 9.

== Personal life ==
His brother Carlos Albert is a former professional soccer player for the Necaxa Club of the Mexican soccer league.
