= Jackie Smith =

American football player (born 1940)

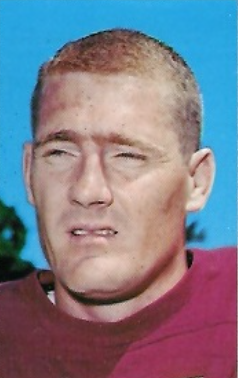
- Smith on Glendale stamp, 1969

No. 81
- Position: Tight end

Personal information
- Born: February 23, 1940 (age 86); Columbia, Mississippi, U.S.
- Listed height: 6 ft 4 in (1.93 m)
- Listed weight: 235 lb (107 kg)

Career information
- High school: Kentwood (Kentwood, Louisiana)
- College: Northwestern State (1959–1962)
- NFL draft: 1963: 10th round, 129th overall pick

Career history
- St. Louis Cardinals (1963–1977); Dallas Cowboys (1978)

Awards and highlights
- 4× Second-team All-Pro (1966–1969); 5× Pro Bowl (1966–1970)

Career NFL statistics
- Receptions: 480
- Receiving yards: 7,918
- Receiving touchdowns: 40
- Stats at Pro Football Reference
- Pro Football Hall of Fame

Jackie Larue Smith (born February 23, 1940) is an American former professional football player who was a tight end in the National Football League (NFL) for the St. Louis Cardinals and the Dallas Cowboys. He played college football for the Northwestern State Demons. He was inducted into the Pro Football Hall of Fame in 1994.

== Early life ==
Smith was born on February 23, 1940, in Columbia, Mississippi. He attended Kentwood High School, in Kentwood, Louisiana, where he started out playing the clarinet for the school's band. He decided to try out for the football team as a sophomore, but suffered a torn Achilles tendon that forced him to sit out the season. As a junior, he had osteomyelitis in his ankle, so he could only play in the second half of the last game of the season.

As a senior, he was named the starting tailback in the team's single-wing formation, but suffered a serious hip injury in the fourth game and could not play the rest of the way, finishing his high school career after appearing in only 5 games.

He also lettered in track and field, competing in the mile relay, the quarter-mile, the low and high hurdles. He won a state championship in the hurdles as a senior.

== College career ==
Northwestern Louisiana State College (now Northwestern State University) in Natchitoches, Louisiana, could only offer him half a scholarship for track, unless he would also agree to play football, so he could qualify for a full scholarship. "They told me, 'If you go out for the football team and don’t quit, we can give you a full scholarship,' " Smith said. "I didn't even have to play—just don't quit."

Smith initially joined the football team to fulfill this provision, but he was good enough to become a starter. During his college career, he had few opportunities to prove his true worth in the Demons' run-oriented offense, leading the team in receiving in his last two years, but recording modest statistics. In track, he competed in the hurdles.

In 1980, he was inducted into the Northwestern State Athletics Hall of Fame. In 1983, he was inducted into the Louisiana Sports Hall of Fame.

== Professional career ==
=== St. Louis Cardinals ===
Smith was selected by the St. Louis Cardinals in the tenth round (129th overall) of the 1963 NFL draft, based on the recommendation of Jack Rockwell, then a Cardinals trainer and a part-time scout, who saw him in a spring game during his senior season, where he showed enough speed to stand out. In the draft's 10th round, as time was expiring to make a selection, someone in the Cardinals draft room recommended taking "'that redheaded track kid from Louisiana'". Smith was a part of a group of 10 rookies that made the team that year.

Smith was so surprised that he even thought it must have been a mistake that he had been drafted, but once drafted was determined to make the team. Before his rookie camp began with the Cardinals, Smith went to Arcadia, Louisiana to ask fellow Northwestern Louisiana alumni, and American Football League star flanker, Charlie Hennigan, to teach Smith how to be a receiver in professional football. Hennigan agreed, and for two weeks taught Smith the footwork on how to defeat the elementary defensive coverage schemes prevalent in the 1960s. With this knowledge, Smith made the Cardinals team as a rookie.

He was originally projected to play flanker, but was named the starter at tight end after Taz Anderson was injured. Fran Polsfoot, the Cardinals ends' coach, saw Smith's potential as a tight end as the position's possibilities were developing in the NFL. In the fifth game of the season against the Pittsburgh Steelers, and Smith's first career start, he posted 212 yards and two touchdowns on nine receptions, while playing a key role in a 24–23 win.

He started the remaining games that season, eight of 14 games in 1964, and then every game he played in for the Cardinals from 1965-74, not relinquishing his starter position for over a decade. He played in 121 straight Cardinals games until suffering an injury in 1971 (when he still started nine games). He also would become a longtime team offensive co-captain.

Besides being a talented receiver with excellent speed, Smith displayed elite conditioning and ran with great determination, not only avoiding tacklers but also running through them. He was an excellent blocker, in an era where the tight ends were expected to block more than feature their receiving skills. He was the team starting punter from 1964 to 1966, until Chuck Latourette took over the role.

His best season came in 1967, when in 14 games he registered 56 receptions for 1,205 (third on the league), 21.5 yard-average per reception and nine touchdowns. His 1,205 yards was nearly a thousand yards more than the overall average for tight ends in the league that year. He was named first-team All-Pro by United Press International (UPI) and second-team All-Pro by the Newspaper Enterprise Association (NEA).

Smith played in five straight Pro Bowls and posted more than 40 receptions in seven seasons. In 1966, the NEA named him second-team All-Pro, and he was named first-team All-Conference by The Sporting News. In 1968, he was named second-team All-Pro by the NEA and UPI; and first-team All-Conference by The Sporting News. In 1969, the NEA named him second-team All-Pro among all NFL and American Football League tight ends. In 1970, the NEA named him second-team All-Conference. Smith proved his durability by playing in 121 straight games, until suffering torn ligaments in the ninth game of the 1971 season.

Smith had two great tight end close contemporaries, fellow Hall of Famers John Mackey (1963-72) and Mike Ditka (1961-72), who were voted first-team All-Pro by the Associated Press (AP) during the first half of Smith's career. The three have been identified as players who took tight ends from only being another blocker, to being excellent receivers as well as strong blockers; with Mackey and Smith introducing the element of breakaway speed as well.

In 1974 and 1975, he was a part of the NFC East divisional champions. In 1975, although he played in only nine games, he contributed to the Cardinals setting an NFL record by allowing only 8 sacks in 14 games.

Injuries that included a problem with the arch in one foot and a spinal condition (his arms would go numb after being tackled) affected him in his last two years. In 1976, he was passed on the depth chart by J. V. Cain and was relegated to a backup role. On December 4, 1977, he announced his retirement after playing 15 seasons and 198 games. In August 1978, it was reported in the media that the Cardinals contacted Smith to return, but no contract was offered.

When he left the Cardinals, only Jim Bakken (who joined the team the year before Smith) played more games than Smith, who played in 198 games. He had a string of 45 straight games with at least one reception from 1967 to 1970. Despite his individual accomplishments, the franchise's success proved fleeting, as the Cardinals only made the playoffs twice in Smith's 15 seasons with them, and were eliminated both times in their first round, with Smith catching only one pass in each game.

=== Dallas Cowboys ===
In late September 1978, the Cowboys needed to add depth at tight end after Jay Saldi fractured his arm in the fourth game of the season against the St. Louis Cardinals. Head coach Tom Landry called Smith on Monday, September 25, looking to convince him to come back from retirement and sign with the defending Super Bowl champions on September 28.

He reported to the team on Thursday, September 28, and provided depth against the Washington Redskins three days later. Although he was the oldest player (38 years old) on the Dallas Cowboys roster, not many could keep up with his running ability, as he could reportedly still run the 40-yard dash in 4.6 seconds.

During the regular season, he was used as a blocking tight end in goal-line formations and did not record a start or a reception. He received a game ball for his blocking after a win against the Philadelphia Eagles.

In the NFC divisional playoff game against the Atlanta Falcons, the Cowboys were behind 20–13 in the third quarter and their starting quarterback Roger Staubach was out of the game with a concussion. Backup quarterback Danny White found Smith in the end zone (one of his 3 receptions) to tie the game and contribute to a 27–20 comeback win.

Smith eventually made his only trip to the Super Bowl, which would end up leaving a mark on his career. With the Cowboys trailing the Pittsburgh Steelers 21–14 in the third quarter of Super Bowl XIII, Smith dropped a third-down pass in the end zone from Staubach, so instead of tying the score, the team had to settle for a field goal. Although this wasn't the only critical play or turning point of the game and Staubach has also stated at different times that it was a poorly thrown pass, because it was such an iconic play, Smith was singled out in the media for the 35–31 loss. ESPN ranked Smith's dropped pass in the end zone No. 24 on their list of "100 Greatest Super Bowl Moments".

Smith retired again, even though the Cowboys still wanted him back for the 1979 season. At the time, Smith's 7,918 career receiving yards were the most ever by an NFL tight end, until he was surpassed by Ozzie Newsome's 7,980 yards in 1990. His 16.5 yards per catch average is currently the highest among all tight ends in the Hall of Fame. As of the end of the 2025 season, Smith ranks 12th in all-time receiving yardage by a tight end.

== Honors ==
On January 29, 1994, Smith was officially voted into the Pro Football Hall of Fame in Canton, Ohio, as the third tight end to ever receive this honor (after Mackey and Ditka), and recognized as one of the key players that helped revolutionize the position. In 1994, he was inducted into the Missouri Sports Hall of Fame. In 2001, he was inducted into the St. Louis Walk of Fame. In 2009, he was inducted into the St. Louis Sports Hall of Fame.

== NFL career statistics ==
Legend
**Bold**	Career high

=== Regular season ===
Year	Team	Games		Receiving					Rushing					Fumbles
Year	Team	GP	GS	Rec	Yds	Avg	Lng	TD	Att	Yds	Avg	Lng	TD	Fum
1963	STL	**14**	9	28	445	15.9	55	2	–	–	–	–	–	2
1964	STL	**14**	8	47	657	14.0	78	4	–	–	–	–	–	2
1965	STL	**14**	**14**	41	648	15.8	70	2	–	–	–	–	–	0
1966	STL	**14**	**14**	45	810	18.0	69	3	1	8	8.0	8	0	1
1967	STL	**14**	**14**	**56**	**1,205**	**21.5**	76	**9**	9	86	9.6	18	0	**3**
1968	STL	**14**	**14**	49	789	16.1	65	2	**12**	**163**	**13.6**	**37**	**3**	0
1969	STL	**14**	**14**	43	561	13.0	34	1	4	0	0.0	9	0	1
1970	STL	**14**	**14**	37	637	18.6	59	4	5	43	8.6	26	0	0
1971	STL	9	9	21	379	18.0	61	4	1	10	10.0	10	0	0
1972	STL	**14**	**14**	26	407	15.7	71	2	5	31	6.2	17	0	0
1973	STL	**14**	**14**	41	600	14.6	42	1	1	-14	-14.0	-14	0	1
1974	STL	**14**	**14**	25	413	16.5	**81**	3	–	–	–	–	–	1
1975	STL	9	7	13	246	18.9	45	2	–	–	–	–	–	0
1976	STL	12	0	3	22	7.3	16	0	–	–	–	–	–	0
1977	STL	**14**	1	5	49	9.8	13	1	–	–	–	–	–	1
1978	DAL	12	2	–	–	–	–	–	–	–	–	–	–	–
Career		210	162	480	7,918	16.5	81	40	38	327	8.6	37	3	12

=== Postseason ===
Year	Team	Games		Receiving					Rushing					Fumbles
Year	Team	GP	GS	Rec	Yds	Avg	Lng	TD	Att	Yds	Avg	Lng	TD	Fum
1974	STL	1	**1**	1	7	7.0	7	0	–	–	–	–	–	0
1975	STL	1	**1**	1	1	1.0	1	0	–	–	–	–	–	0
1978	DAL	**3**	0	**3**	**38**	**12.7**	**18**	**1**	**1**	-9	-9.0	-9	0	0
Career		5	2	5	46	9.2	18	1	1	-9	-9.0	-9	0	0

== Personal life ==
Smith has worked in the marketing of Hobie Cat boats, including pedal kayaks and the Mirage Pro Angler. He has performed the national anthem at different sporting events.
