= J. V. Cain =

American football player (1951–1979)

No. 88
- Position: Tight end

Personal information
- Born: July 22, 1951; Houston, Texas, U.S.
- Died: July 22, 1979 (aged 28); St. Charles, Missouri, U.S.
- Listed height: 6 ft 4 in (1.93 m)
- Listed weight: 224 lb (102 kg)

Career information
- High school: Booker T. Washington (Houston)
- College: Colorado
- NFL draft: 1974: 1st round, 7th overall pick

Career history
- St. Louis Cardinals (1974–1978)

Awards and highlights
- Arizona Cardinals No. 88 retired; Second-team All-American (1973); First-team All-Big Eight (1973)

Career NFL statistics
- Receptions: 76
- Receiving yards: 1,014
- Receiving touchdowns: 9
- Stats at Pro Football Reference

James Victor Cain, Jr. (July 22, 1951 – July 22, 1979) was an American football tight end who played for the St. Louis Cardinals of the National Football League (NFL). He played college football for the Colorado Buffaloes and was selected by the Cardinals seventh overall in the 1974 NFL draft.

== Professional career ==
Cain was selected seventh overall in the first round of the 1974 NFL draft by the St. Louis Cardinals. Despite the Cardinals already having a starting tight end in Jackie Smith, general manager George Boone believed Cain was too good a talent to pass up and decided to draft him anyway to play as Smith's backup. In his first two seasons, Cain played in a total of 28 games with ten starts, totaling 286 yards and two touchdowns, and was also named the Cardinals' rookie of the year in 1974.

In 1976, Cain became a full-time starting tight end for the Cardinals, starting all 14 games and catching for 400 yards and five touchdowns. He started every game of the 1977 season as well, catching for 328 yards and two touchdowns.

In 1978, Jackie Smith joined the Dallas Cowboys, leaving Cain the top tight end on the Cardinals' roster. However, Cain then suffered an Achilles tendon injury in training camp and missed the entirety of the 1978 season. A devout Christian, Cain used his time that season to read the Bible, and prayed that after recovering from the injury, he would go on to become an All-Pro tight end. As he had hoped, Cain did make a full recovery from his Achilles injury, though he never played another down of NFL football.

== Death and legacy ==
On July 22, 1979, his 28th birthday, at about 8:30 p.m., Cain suddenly collapsed during a no-contact training camp practice at Lindenwood College in St. Charles, Missouri. He was revived by CPR and taken to nearby St. Joseph's Hospital, where he died less than two hours later. His death was found to be due to an extremely rare congenital heart problem, undetectable except by autopsy, which was exacerbated by strenuous exercise.

In honor of Cain, the St. Louis Cardinals football team wore black armbands during the 1979 season. Cain's number 88 is retired by the Cardinals.

== Career statistics ==
Regular season statistics
| Year | Team | Games | | Receiving | | | | | Fumbles | |
| Year | Team | GP | GS | Rec | Yds | Avg | Lng | TD | Fum | Lost |
|---|---|---|---|---|---|---|---|---|---|---|
| 1974 | STL | 14 | 3 | 13 | 152 | 11.7 | 40 | 1 | 0 | 0 |
| 1975 | STL | 14 | 7 | 12 | 134 | 11.2 | 18 | 1 | 2 | 0 |
| 1976 | STL | 14 | 14 | 26 | 400 | 15.4 | 34 | 5 | 0 | 0 |
| 1977 | STL | 13 | 13 | 25 | 328 | 13.1 | 38 | 2 | 0 | 0 |
| Career | | 55 | 37 | 76 | 1,014 | 13.3 | 40 | 9 | 2 | 0 |

Postseason statistics
| Year | Team | Games | | Receiving | | | | | Fumbles | |
| Year | Team | GP | GS | Rec | Yds | Avg | Lng | TD | Fum | Lost |
|---|---|---|---|---|---|---|---|---|---|---|
| 1974 | STL | 1 | 0 | 0 | 0 | 0 | 0 | 0 | 0 | 0 |
| 1975 | STL | 1 | 1 | 2 | 17 | 8.5 | 11 | 0 | 0 | 0 |
| Career | | 2 | 1 | 2 | 17 | 8.5 | 11 | 0 | 0 | 0 |

== See also ==
- List of gridiron football players who died during their careers
