= Terry Metcalf =

American football player (born 1951)

No. 21, 26
- Position: Running back

Personal information
- Born: September 24, 1951 (age 75); Seattle, Washington, U.S.
- Listed height: 5 ft 10 in (1.78 m)
- Listed weight: 185 lb (84 kg)

Career information
- High school: Franklin (Seattle)
- College: Long Beach State & Everett Community College
- NFL draft: 1973: 3rd round, 63rd overall pick

Career history
- St. Louis Cardinals (1973–1977); Toronto Argonauts (1978–1980); Washington Redskins (1981)

Awards and highlights
- Second-team All-Pro (1975); 3× Pro Bowl (1974, 1975, 1977); CFL East Division All-Star (1979); First-team Little All-American (1971)

Career NFL statistics
- Rushing yards: 3,498
- Rushing touchdowns: 24
- Receptions: 245
- Receiving yards: 2,457
- Receiving touchdowns: 9
- Stats at Pro Football Reference

Career CFL statistics
- Rushing yards: 1,914
- Rushing average: 4.3
- Touchdowns: 15

Terrance Randolph Metcalf (born September 24, 1951) is an American former professional football player who was a running back for six seasons in the National Football League (NFL), five of them with the St. Louis Cardinals and one with the Washington Redskins. He also played three seasons in the Canadian Football League (CFL) with the Toronto Argonauts.

== College career ==
Born and raised in Seattle, Washington, Metcalf played college football at Everett Community College and California State College, Long Beach in Southern California. He is the father of former NFL wide receiver and kick returner Eric Metcalf.

Metcalf also competed for the Long Beach State Beach track and field team, becoming an All-American in the long jump.

== Professional career ==
Metcalf finished his NFL career with 3,489 rushing yards, 245 receptions for 2,457 yards, 936 punt return yards, and 3,087 yards returning kickoffs. He also scored 36 touchdowns (24 rushing, 9 receiving, 1 punt return, 2 kickoff returns). He holds the record for most games with 250+ all purpose yards: 7.

In the 14-game 1975 season, Metcalf set a then-NFL record for combined yards with 2,462. This feat has since been eclipsed during the 16-game era (instituted in 1978), with Lionel James of the San Diego Chargers being the first to do so in 1985. James' head coach was Don Coryell, who also coached Metcalf during his record-setting season. He also became the first player in NFL history to average at least 30 yards per kick return and 10 yards per punt return in the same season. Joshua Cribbs of the Cleveland Browns became the second in 2007.

In 1978, Metcalf signed with the Toronto Argonauts. He played three seasons in the Canadian Football League. In 1978, he rushed 169 times for 669 yards, and caught 31 passes. In 1979, as a division all-star, he carried the ball 141 times for 691 yards and caught 55 passes, and in his final year, 1980, he rushed for 540 yards and caught 51 passes.

Metcalf finished his career in the NFL with the Redskins in 1981. He was inducted into the St. Louis Sports Hall of Fame in 2018. and the Missouri Sports Hall of Fame in 2020.

== NFL/CFL career statistics ==
Legend
	Led the league
**Bold**	Career high

=== NFL ===
==== Rushing/receiving stats ====
Year	Team	Games		Rushing						Receiving					Fumbles	
Year	Team	GP	GS	Att	Yds	Avg	Y/G	Lng	TD	Rec	Yds	Avg	Lng	TD	Fum	FR
1973	STL	12	10	148	628	4.2	52.3	50	2	37	316	8.5	35	0	9	2
1974	STL	14	13	152	718	4.7	51.3	**75**	6	**50**	377	7.5	22	1	14	**7**
1975	STL	13	13	**165**	**816**	4.9	**62.8**	52	**9**	43	378	8.8	30	2	8	2
1976	STL	12	12	134	537	4.0	44.8	36	3	33	388	11.8	48	**4**	**15**	5
1977	STL	14	11	149	739	**5.0**	52.8	62	4	34	403	11.9	**68**	2	10	1
1981	WAS	16	2	18	60	3.3	3.8	12	0	48	**595**	**12.4**	52	0	6	1
Career		81	61	766	3,498	4.6	43.2	75	24	245	2,457	10.0	68	9	62	18

==== Returning stats ====
Year	Team	GP	PRet	Yards	Y/R	Lng	TD	KRet	Yards	Y/R	Lng	TD
1973	STL	12	–	–	–	–	–	4	124	31.0	48	0
1974	STL	14	**26**	**340**	**13.1**	43	0	20	623	**31.2**	**94**	**1**
1975	STL	13	23	285	12.4	**69**	**1**	**35**	**960**	27.4	93	**1**
1976	STL	12	17	188	11.1	39	0	16	325	20.3	33	0
1977	STL	14	14	108	7.7	23	0	32	772	24.1	51	0
1981	WAS	16	4	15	3.8	13	0	14	283	20.2	36	0
Career		81	84	936	11.1	69	1	121	3,087	25.5	94	2

=== CFL ===
Year	Team	Games	Rushing						Receiving					Fumbles
Year	Team	GP	Att	Yds	Avg	Y/G	Lng	TD	Rec	Yds	Avg	Lng	TD	Fum
1978	TOR	15	**169**	669	4.3	44.6	**54**	3	31	269	8.7	34	1	**9**
1979	TOR	14	141	**691**	**4.9**	**49.4**	30	2	**55**	**568**	**10.3**	**40**	**5**	8
1980	TOR	15	140	554	4.0	36.9	25	**4**	51	417	8.2	39	1	7
Career		44	450	1,914	4.3	43.5	54	9	137	1,254	9.2	40	7	24

== Coaching career ==
Metcalf coached at Renton High School in Renton, Washington until 2008.
