= Greg Kindle =

American gridiron football player (born 1950)

No. 69, 63, 54
- Position: Offensive guard / Offensive tackle

Personal information
- Born: September 16, 1950 (age 76); Houston, Texas, U.S.
- Listed height: 6 ft 4 in (1.93 m)
- Listed weight: 265 lb (120 kg)

Career information
- High school: Wheatley (Houston)
- College: Tennessee State (1970–1973)
- NFL draft: 1974: 2nd round, 33rd overall pick

Career history
- St. Louis Cardinals (1974–1975); Atlanta Falcons (1976–1977); Denver Broncos (1978)*; Winnipeg Blue Bombers (1978–1979)
- * Offseason or practice squad member only

Awards and highlights
- Small college national champion (1973); 3× Black college football national champion (1970, 1971, 1973); Second-team small college All-American (1973)
- Stats at Pro Football Reference

Gregory Lamarr Kindle (born September 16, 1950) is an American former professional football offensive lineman who played four seasons in the National Football League (NFL) with the St. Louis Cardinals and Atlanta Falcons. He was selected by the Cardinals in the second round of the 1974 NFL draft after playing college football at Tennessee State University.

== Early life ==
Gregory Lamarr Kindle was born on September 16, 1950, in Houston, Texas. He attended Wheatley High School in Houston. He mainly played basketball in high school and did not play football until his senior year.

== College caree ==
Kindle was a four-year letterman for the Tennessee State Tigers of Tennessee State University from 1970 to 1973. The Tigers were black college football national champions in 1970, 1971, and 1973. In 1973, they also went undefeated and were named AP small college national champions. As a senior, Kindle earned Pittsburgh Courier first-team Black All-American and Associated Press second-team small college All-American honors. After his senior season, he was invited to play in the Chicago Charities College All-Star Game, Blue–Gray Football Classic, North–South Shrine Game, and Coaches All-America Game.

== Professional career ==
Kindle was selected by the St. Louis Cardinals in the second round, with the 33rd overall pick, of the 1974 NFL draft. He signed with the team on January 31, 1974. He played in ten games, starting two, for the Cardinals during his rookie year in 1974. He appeared in all 14 games in 1975 as the Cardinals finished with an 11–3 record. Kindle also played in the team's playoff game, a divisional round loss to the Los Angeles Rams.

On August 23, 1976, Kindle and a 1977 first round draft pick were traded to the Atlanta Falcons for John Zook. Kindle played in ten games, all starts, for the Falcons in 1976 and recovered one fumble. In August 1977, it was reported that Kindle wanted to be traded due to a contract dispute with the Falcons. He appeared in one game during the 1977 season before being released on October 25, 1977.

Kindle signed with the Denver Broncos in March 1978. However, in May 1978 he failed a physical and was released.

Kindle was then signed by the Winnipeg Blue Bombers of the Canadian Football League and played in 13 games for them during the 1978 season. On September 30, 1978, against the BC Lions, Kindle and four other Blue Bombers players were ejected for fighting. They were all later fined $100. Kindle played in seven games in 1979.
