= Steve George (American football) =

American football player (born 1951)

No. 63, 71
- Position: Defensive tackle

Personal information
- Born: April 11, 1951 (age 75); Sulphur Springs, Texas, U.S.
- Listed height: 6 ft 5 in (1.96 m)
- Listed weight: 265 lb (120 kg)

Career information
- High school: Plano (Plano, Texas)
- College: Houston
- NFL draft: 1974: 3rd round, 60th overall pick

Career history
- St. Louis Cardinals (1974–1975); New Orleans Saints (1976); Atlanta Falcons (1976)
- Stats at Pro Football Reference

Stephen Elwood George (born April 11, 1951) is an American former professional football defensive tackle who played two seasons in the National Football League (NFL) with the St. Louis Cardinals and Atlanta Falcons. He was selected by the Cardinals in the third round of the 1974 NFL draft. He played college football at the University of Houston.

== Early life and college ==
Stephen Elwood George was born on April 11, 1951, in Sulphur Springs, Texas. He attended Plano Senior High School in Plano, Texas.

George was a member of the Houston Cougars of the University of Houston from 1970 to 1972. He was a two-year letterman from 1971 to 1972, and was listed as ineligible in 1973.

== Professional career ==
George was selected by the St. Louis Cardinals in the third round, with the 60th overall pick, of the 1974 NFL draft. He officially signed with the team on March 15. He played in 13 games for the Cardinals in 1974 and recovered one fumble. George also appeared in one playoff game that year. He was placed on injured reserve with a knee injury in 1975 and missed the entire season.

In late July 1976, George was traded to the New Orleans Saints for an undisclosed pick in the 1977 NFL draft. George had previously asked the Cardinals to trade him. He was placed on injured reserve in late August 1976. He was later released.

George was signed by the Atlanta Falcons later in 1976. He played in one game for the Falcons during the 1976 season. He was released in 1977.
