= 1978 Pro Bowl =

National Football League all-star game

1978 NFL Pro Bowl
AFC	NFC
13	14
Head coach: Ted Marchibroda (Baltimore Colts)	Head coach: Chuck Knox (Los Angeles Rams)
	1	2	3	4	Total
AFC	3	10	0	0	13
NFC	0	0	7	7	14
- Date: January 23, 1978
- Stadium: Tampa Stadium; Tampa, Florida
- MVP: Walter Payton (Chicago Bears)
- Referee: Fred Wyant
- Attendance: 50,716

TV in the United States
- Network: ABC
- Announcers: Frank Gifford, Howard Cosell & Don Meredith

The 1978 Pro Bowl was the NFL's 28th annual all-star game which featured the outstanding performers from the 1977 season. The game was played on Monday, January 23, 1978, at Tampa Stadium in Tampa, Florida before a crowd of 50,716. The final score was NFC 14, AFC 13.

Ted Marchibroda of the Baltimore Colts lead the AFC team against an NFC team coached by Los Angeles Rams head coach Chuck Knox. The referee was Fred Wyant.

Walter Payton of the Chicago Bears was named the game's Most Valuable Player. Players on the winning NFC team received $5,000 apiece while the AFC participants each took home $2,500.

Instead of the losing coaches in each conference championship game coaching the Pro Bowl squads, coaches were selected from the divisional round losers with the best record in their respective conferences (wild card teams excepted). The coaches for the next four Pro Bowls were selected in the same manner.

== Rosters ==
=== AFC ===
1978 AFC Pro Bowl roster
Quarterbacks: 11 Ken Stabler (OAK); 12 Bob Griese (MIA); Running backs: 32 Franco Harris (PIT) FB; 26 Lydell Mitchell (BAL) RB; 34 Greg Pruitt (CLE) FB; 30 Mark van Eeghen (OAK) RB; Wide receivers: 84 Billy Johnson (HOU) KR / PR; 89 Nat Moore (MIA); 00 Ken Burrough (HOU); 88 Lynn Swann (PIT); 21 Cliff Branch (OAK); Tight ends: 81 Russ Francis (NE); 87 Dave Casper (OAK)	Offensive linemen: 78 Art Shell (OAK) T; 75 George Kunz (BAL) T; 63 Gene Upshaw (OAK) G; 67 Bob Kuechenberg (MIA) G; 50 Dave Dalby (OAK) C; 62 Jim Langer (MIA) C; 70 Russ Washington (SD) T; 68 Joe DeLamielleure (BUF) G; Defensive linemen: 68 L. C. Greenwood (PIT) DE; 75 Joe Greene (PIT) DE; 77 Lyle Alzado (DEN) DE; 65 Elvin Bethea (HOU) DT; 74 Louie Kelcher (SD) DT; 76 Curley Culp (HOU) DE	Linebackers: 53 Randy Gradishar (DEN) ILB / MLB; 58 Jack Lambert (PIT) MLB; 57 Tom Jackson (DEN) OLB; 52 Robert Brazile (HOU) OLB; Defensive backs: 20 Louis Wright (DEN) CB; 27 Thom Darden (CLE) CB; 22 Mike Haynes (NE) CB; 47 Mel Blount (PIT) CB; 36 Bill Thompson (DEN) SS; 31 Donnie Shell (PIT) FS; Special teams: 8 Ray Guy (OAK) P; 1 Garo Yepremian (MIA) K

Rookies in Italics

=== NFC ===
1978 NFC Pro Bowl roster
Quarterbacks: 12 Roger Staubach (DAL); 11 Pat Haden (RAM); 17 Jim Hart (STL); Running backs: 30 Lawrence McCutcheon (RAM) HB; 21 Terry Metcalf (STL) HB; 44 Chuck Foreman (MIN) RB; 34 Walter Payton (CHI) HB; Wide receivers: 83 Sammy White (MIN); 88 Drew Pearson (DAL); 82 Mel Gray (STL); 29 Harold Jackson (RAM); Tight ends: 89 Billy Joe Dupree (DAL); 81 David Hill (DET)	Offensive linemen: 77 Doug France (RAM) T; 72 Dan Dierdorf (STL) T; 73 Ron Yary (MIN) T; 75 Stan Walters (PHI) T; 60 Dennis Harrah (RAM) T/G; 61 Rich Saul (RAM) C; 64 Bob Young (STL) G / DL; Defensive linemen: 85 Jack Youngblood (RAM) DE; 79 Harvey Martin (DAL) DE; 78 Doug English (DET) DT; 77 Claude Humphrey (ATL) DE; 54 Randy White (DAL) DT; 90 Larry Brooks (RAM) DT; 75 Cody Jones (RAM) DE / DT; 76 Dave Pear (TB) DT	Linebackers: 10 Brad Van Pelt (NYG) ILB; 56 Thomas Henderson (DAL) OLB; 59 Matt Blair (MIN) ILB; 53 Harry Carson (NYG); 66 Bill Bergey (PHI) ILB / MLB; Defensive backs: 26 Willie Buchanon (GB) CB; 27 Pat Thomas (RAM) CB; 29 Ken Houston (WAS) CB / S; 43 Cliff Harris (DAL) FS; 41 Charlie Waters (DAL) CB; 49 Rod Perry (RAM) SS; Special teams: 13 Dave Jennings (NYG) P; 1 Frank Corral (RAM) K

Rookies in Italics
