= Greg Hartle =

American football player (born 1951)

No. 50
- Position: Linebacker

Personal information
- Born: February 14, 1951 (age 75); Savannah, Georgia, U.S.
- Listed height: 6 ft 2 in (1.88 m)
- Listed weight: 225 lb (102 kg)

Career information
- High school: Newberry (Newberry, South Carolina)
- College: Newberry (1970–1973)
- NFL draft: 1974: 10th round, 251st overall pick

Career history
- St. Louis Cardinals (1974–1976); Washington Redskins (1977)
- Stats at Pro Football Reference

Gregory Alan Hartle (born February 14, 1951) is an American former professional football linebacker who played three seasons with the St. Louis Cardinals of the National Football League (NFL). He was selected by the Cardinals in the tenth round of the 1974 NFL draft after playing college football at Newberry College.

== Early life and college ==
Gregory Alan Hartle was born on February 14, 1951, in Savannah, Georgia. He attended Newberry High School in Newberry, South Carolina.

Hartle was a member of the Newberry Wolves of Newberry College from 1970 to 1973 as a linebacker and defensive end.

== Professional career ==
Hartle was selected by the St. Louis Cardinals in the tenth round, with the 251st overall pick, of the 1974 NFL draft as a linebacker. He started the first three games of the 1974 season in place of the injured Mark Arneson. Arneson returned as the starter after recovering. Overall, Hartle played in 14 games, starting three, for the Cardinals during his rookie year in 1974 and recovered one fumble. He was Newberry College's first NFL player. He appeared in 13 games, starting three in place of the injured Arneson, during the 1975 season, recording one fumble recovery and one kick return for 20 yards. Hartle also started the first game of the season in 1976 but was then placed on injured reserve for the rest of the year. He became a free agent after the season.

Hartle signed with the Washington Redskins on April 5, 1977. He was placed on injured reserve on August 10, 1977, and spent the entire year there. He became a free agent after the season.
