= Wayne Sevier =

American football coach (1941–1999)

Personal information
- Born: July 3, 1941; San Diego, California, U.S.
- Died: October 2, 1999 (aged 58); San Diego, California, U.S.

Career information
- High school: National City (CA) Sweetwater
- College: San Diego State

Career history
- San Diego Chargers (1979–1980) Special teams coach; Washington Redskins (1981–1986) Special teams coach; San Diego Chargers (1987–1988) Special teams coach; Washington Redskins (1989–1992) Special teams coach; Los Angeles Rams (1994) Special teams coach; St. Louis Rams (1995) Special teams coach; San Diego Chargers (1998) Special teams coach

Awards and highlights
- 2× Super Bowl champion (XVII, XXVI)

Wayne Sevier (July 3, 1941 – October 2, 1999) was an American football coach. He served as an assistant coach for the San Diego Chargers, Washington Redskins, Los Angeles Rams and St. Louis Rams.

He died of a heart attack on October 2, 1999, in San Diego, California at age 58.
