= 1977 St. Louis Cardinals (NFL) season =

American football team season

1977 St. Louis Cardinals season
- Owner: Bill Bidwill
- Head coach: Don Coryell
- Home stadium: Busch Memorial Stadium

Results
- Record: 7–7
- Division place: 3rd NFC East
- Playoffs: Did not qualify
- Pro Bowlers: C Tom Banks; G Conrad Dobler; T Dan Dierdorf; QB Jim Hart; RB Terry Metcalf; WR Mel Gray; CB Roger Wehrli

The 1977 St. Louis Cardinals season was the franchise’s 56th year with the National Football League and the 18th season in St. Louis. The Cardinals posted a 7-7 record in the final season in St Louis for head coach Don Coryell who began coaching the San Diego Chargers the following year. The Cardinals, with a 7-3 record, hosted the Miami Dolphins on Thanksgiving, replacing the Dallas Cowboys, and were blown out 55-14 to begin a four-game losing streak that ended the season.

Coryell's final game with the Cardinals was an embarrassing 17–7 loss to the Tampa Bay Buccaneers, who won for the first time at Tampa Stadium following 13 consecutive home defeats. It was the Bucs' second consecutive victory following an NFL-record 26-game losing streak; Tampa Bay won 33–14 at New Orleans the previous week.

== Offseason ==
=== NFL draft ===
1977 St. Louis Cardinals draft
Round	Pick	Player	Position	College	Notes
1	19	Steve Pisarkiewicz	Quarterback	Missouri	
2	47	George Franklin	Running back	Texas A&I	
3	78	Kurt Allerman	Linebacker	Penn State	
3	80	Terdell Middleton	Running back	Memphis State	
Made roster * Made at least one Pro Bowl during career

=== Undrafted free agents ===
1977 undrafted free agents of note
Player	Position	College
Jeff Blanc	Running back	BYU
David Burke	Running back	Kearney State
Wayne Carmody	Defensive back	Southern Illinois
Rob Fitzgerald	Defensive back	Missouri
Gil Foushee	Wide receiver	Duke
David Headstream	Linebacker	SMU
Doug Jackson	Punter	South Dakota State

== Personnel ==
=== Staff ===
1977 St. Louis Cardinals staff
Front office: Owner – Bill Bidwill; Director of Operations – Joe Sullivan; Assistant director of Operations – Larry Wilson; Head coaches: Head coach – Don Coryell; Offensive coaches: Quarterbacks/Receivers – Harry Gilmer; Offensive Backs – Joe Gibbs; Offensive Line – Jim Hanifan; Special Assignments – Dan Brooks	Defensive coaches: Defensive Coordinator – Ray Willsey; Defensive Line – Willie Zapalac; Defensive Backs – Chuck Weber

=== Roster ===
1977 St. Louis Cardinals roster
Quarterbacks (QB): 10 Bill Donckers; 17 Jim Hart; 15 Steve Pisarkiewicz; Running backs (RB): 34 Steve Jones; 32 Jerry Latin; 21 Terry Metcalf; 24 Wayne Morris; 35 Jim Otis; Wide receivers (WR): 85 Mel Gray; 84 Ike Harris; 83 Pat Tilley; Tight ends (TE): 88 J. V. Cain; 81 Jackie Smith	Offensive linemen (OL): 75 Dan Audick G; 54 Tom Banks C; 51 Tom Brahaney C; 72 Dan Dierdorf T; 66 Conrad Dobler G; 60 Roger Finnie T; 65 Brad Oates T; 62 Keith Wortman T/G; 64 Bob Young G; Defensive linemen (DL): 79 Bob Bell DE; 76 Charlie Davis DT; 73 Mike Dawson DT; 74 Walt Patulski DE; 78 Ron Yankowski DE; 63 John Zook DE	Linebackers (LB): 50 Kurt Allerman OLB; 57 Mark Arneson OLB; 58 Tim Black OLB; 56 Tim Kearney MLB; 59 Marv Kellum MLB; 53 Steve Neils OLB; 55 Eric Williams OLB; Defensive backs (DB): 27 Carl Allen CB; 30 Bill Bradley FS; 26 Rondy Colbert CB; 28 Robert Giblin SS; 36 Ken Reaves SS; 46 Jeff Severson FS; 23 Ken Stone FS; 22 Roger Wehrli CB; Special teams (ST): 25 Jim Bakken K; 12 Duane Carrell P	Reserve: -- Rick Fenlaw LB (IR); 44 George Franklin RB (IR); 38 Lee Nelson CB (IR); 20 Mike Sensibaugh S (IR); 45 Perry Smith CB (IR); 55 Ray White LB (IR); Rookies in italics

== Regular season ==
On November 24, 1977, Dolphins quarterback Bob Griese would throw for six touchdown passes in a Thanksgiving Day match versus the Cardinals. The Dolphins would set a franchise record for most points scored in one game with 55. Of note, the Dolphins would score eight touchdowns and accumulate 34 first downs. This would end the experiment of the Cardinals playing on Thanksgiving, and the following season the Dallas Cowboys would go back in that holiday slot.

=== Schedule ===
Week	Date	Opponent	Result	Record	Venue	Attendance
1	September 18	at Denver Broncos	**L** 0–7	0–1	Mile High Stadium	75,002
2	September 25	Chicago Bears	**W** 16–13	1–1	Busch Memorial Stadium	49,878
3	October 2	at **Washington Redskins**	**L** 14–24	1–2	RFK Stadium	55,031
4	October 9	**Dallas Cowboys**	**L** 24–30	1–3	Busch Memorial Stadium	50,129
5	October 16	at **Philadelphia Eagles**	**W** 21–17	2–3	Veterans Stadium	60,535
6	October 23	New Orleans Saints	**W** 49–31	3–3	Busch Memorial Stadium	48,417
7	October 31	**New York Giants**	**W** 28–0	4–3	Busch Memorial Stadium	50,323
8	November 6	at Minnesota Vikings	**W** 27–7	5–3	Metropolitan Stadium	47,066
9	November 14	at **Dallas Cowboys**	**W** 24–17	6–3	Texas Stadium	64,038
10	November 20	**Philadelphia Eagles**	**W** 21–16	7–3	Busch Memorial Stadium	48,768
11	November 24	Miami Dolphins	**L** 14–55	7–4	Busch Memorial Stadium	50,269
12	December 4	at **New York Giants**	**L** 7–27	7–5	Giants Stadium	71,826
13	December 10	**Washington Redskins**	**L** 20–26	7–6	Busch Memorial Stadium	36,067
14	December 18	at Tampa Bay Buccaneers	**L** 7–17	7–7	Tampa Stadium	56,922
Note: Intra-division opponents are in **bold** text.

=== Week 2 ===
Week 2: Chicago Bears at St. Louis Cardinals

Quarter	1	2	3	4	Total
Bears	3	0	3	7	**13**
**Cardinals**	3	10	3	0	**16**

at Busch Memorial Stadium, St. Louis, Missouri

- Date: September 25, 1977
- Game time: 1:00 p.m. CST
- Game weather: Overcast, 68 °F (20 °C)
- TV announcers (CBS): Frank Glieber and Johnny Morris

Game information

**First quarter**

**Second quarter**

**Third quarter**

**Fourth quarter**

Top passers

- CHI – Bob Avellini – 18/37, 177 yards, 1 TD, 2 INT
- STL – Jim Hart – 16/24, 215 yards, 1 TD, 2 INT

Top rushers

- CHI – Roland Harper – 14 rushes, 65 yards
- STL – Jim Otis – 20 rushes, 64 yards

Top receivers

- CHI – James Scott – 5 receptions, 64 yards
- STL – Mel Gray – 5 receptions, 95 yards

=== Week 5 ===
- Place: Veterans Stadium, Philadelphia, Pennsylvania
- Television: CBS
- Announcers: Gary Bender, Tom Matte

Jim Hart, questionable all week with an injury, passed 38 yards to Ike Harris for a TD. Terry Metcalf and Jerry Latin both scored on runs of 10 and two yards to lift the Cardinals to a much-needed win over the Eagles.

=== Week 6 ===
- Place: Busch Stadium, St. Louis, Missouri
- Television: CBS
- Announcers: Gary Bender, Tom Matte

Mel Gray caught passes from quarterback Jim Hart and running back Terry Metcalf for touchdowns and Wayne Morris scored four times on short distance runs in St. Louis' wide-open victory to get back in the running for a playoff spot. Bobby Scott passed for two touchdowns for the Saints, who wiped out a 21-0 lead, then fell back again. The Saints totaled 440 yards on offense while the victorious Cardinals gained 494 yards.

=== Week 8 ===
- Place: Metropolitan Stadium, Bloomington, Minnesota
- Television: CBS
- Announcers: Pat Summerall and Tom Brookshier

"I think we were fortunate to catch them a little flat and we were at the top of our game" Don Coryell said after his Cardinals beat the front running Central Division leaders Vikings. The Cardinals rolled up 316 yards on the ground and Jim Hart completed 10 of 14 passes for 143 yards and two touchdowns. The short scoring passes to Wayne Morris and Terry Metcalf came in the first half. The two running backs each scored twice as the Cardinals piled up a 27-0 lead before Minnesota scored late in the third quarter with a 9-yard touchdown pass from Fran Tarkenton to Sammy White. Vikings coach Bud Grant said "The Cardinals offense is outstanding. We didn't think we could stop them but we did think we could outscore them. Had we scored a couple times when we were down there, it might have been a different game."

=== Standings ===
NFC East
	W	L	T	PCT	DIV	CONF	PF	PA	STK
Dallas Cowboys^{(1)}	12	2	0	.857	7–1	11–1	345	212	W4
Washington Redskins	9	5	0	.643	4–4	8–4	196	189	W3
St. Louis Cardinals	7	7	0	.500	4–4	7–5	272	287	L4
Philadelphia Eagles	5	9	0	.357	2–6	4–8	220	207	W2
New York Giants	5	9	0	.357	3–5	5–7	181	265	L2
