= Jim Hart (American football) =

American football player (born 1944)

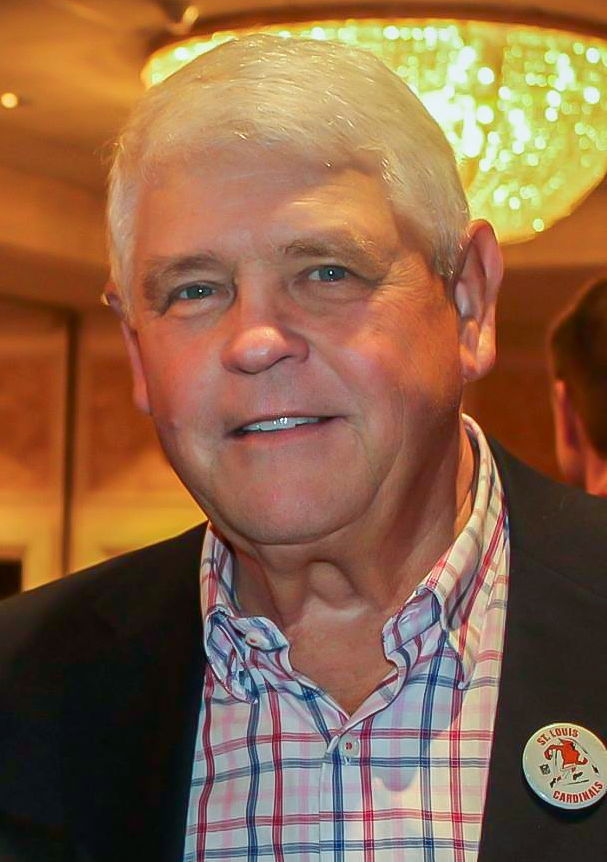
- Hart in 2016.

No. 7, 17
- Position: Quarterback

Personal information
- Born: April 29, 1944 (age 82); Evanston, Illinois, U.S.
- Listed height: 6 ft 1 in (1.85 m)
- Listed weight: 215 lb (98 kg)

Career information
- High school: Niles West (Skokie, Illinois)
- College: Southern Illinois (1963–1965)
- NFL draft: 1966: undrafted

Career history

Playing
- St. Louis Cardinals (1966–1983); Washington Redskins (1984)

Operations
- Southern Illinois (1989–1999) Athletic director

Awards and highlights
- Second-team All-Pro (1974); 4× Pro Bowl (1974–1977); UPI NFC Offensive Player of the Year (1974); "Whizzer" White NFL Man of the Year (1975); Arizona Cardinals Ring of Honor

Career NFL statistics
- Passing attempts: 5,076
- Passing completions: 2,593
- Completion percentage: 51.1%
- TD–INT: 209–247
- Passing yards: 34,665
- Passer rating: 66.6
- Stats at Pro Football Reference

James Warren Hart (born April 29, 1944) is an American former professional football player who was a quarterback in the National Football League (NFL) for the St. Louis Cardinals from 1966 through 1983 and the Washington Redskins in 1984. He played college football for the Southern Illinois Salukis.

== Early life ==
Hart was raised just outside Chicago for the first few years of his life, until his father died when he was seven. His mother remarried, and Hart's stepfather encouraged him to play sports. He started playing football as a quarterback at Niles West High School in Skokie, Illinois; he also lettered in basketball for three years and played baseball.

== College career ==
Hart received a football scholarship to play for the Southern Illinois Salukis from 1963 through 1965. After no team picked him in the 1966 NFL draft, Hart's former coach Don Shroyer invited him to a tryout with the Cardinals. He impressed the team and was signed soon after.

=== College career statistics ===
Southern Illinois Salukis
Season	Passing						Rushing		
Season	Cmp	Att	Yds	TD	Int	Rtg	Att	Yds	TD
1963	72	152	1,041	14	9	123.5	29	-89	1
1964	111	267	1,594	13	22	91.3	37	-232	0
1965	100	252	1,144	7	23	68.7	33	-74	3
Career	283	671	3,779	34	54	90.1	99	-395	4

== NFL career ==
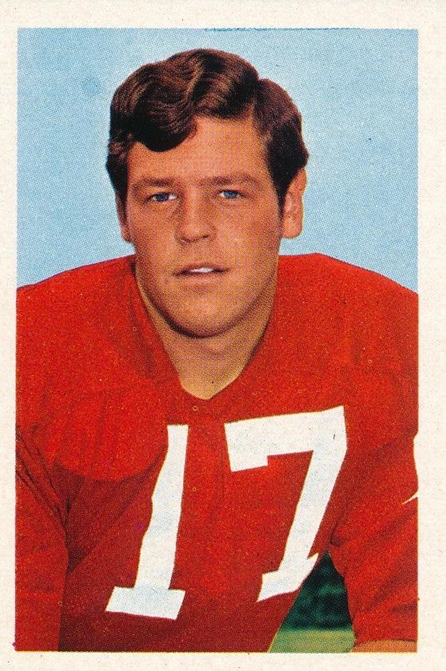
1971 stamp of Hart for St. Louis Cardinals

Hart played in relief of Terry Nofsinger in the final game of the 1966 season on December 17 for the St. Louis Cardinals, who had lost Charley Johnson due to having fufill a ROTC commitment. Hart completed four of 11 passes for 29 yards in a 38–10 loss to Cleveland.

In the 1967 season, Hart started all 14 games, going 6–7–1 while throwing for 3,008 yards with 19 touchdowns and 30 interceptions on a 48.4 completion percentage. Both his yards and interceptions would prove to be career highs. The following year, he and the team improved slightly, with him going 8–3–1 in the 12 games he started (with Johnson starting two games), throwing for 2,059 yards with 15 touchdowns to 18 interceptions on a 44.3 completion percentage. Hart split time with Johnson for the 1969 season, playing in nine games while starting five (with Johnson starting the other nine), and he went 2–3 with 1,086 yards for six touchdowns and 12 interceptions on a 49.7 completion percentage, although the team won just four games for the first time since 1962.

These early career teams were mediocre at best (31–33–5 in his first seven years), but the hiring of coach Don Coryell in 1973 turned things around. From 1974 to 1976, he guided the Cardinals to three straight ten-plus-win seasons along with back-to-back NFC East crowns in 1974 and 1975, leading the "Cardiac Cards" to ten game-winning drives during that three-year span. The Cardinals played their first playoff game in 26 years with the matchup in Minnesota on December 21, 1974, with Hart leading the Cardinals to the first score of the game on a pass from 13 yards to Earl Thomas in the second quarter. Although they were tied at halftime, it did not last, as the Vikings would roll to a 30–14 victory on 23 points in the second half. Hart would throw 18-of-40 for 200 yards with a touchdown and an interception while being sacked twice. For the matchup in the 1975 playoffs, they faced the Los Angeles Rams. Hart's early struggles would prove to doom the Cardinals, as he threw two interceptions that would each be returned for touchdowns, and the Rams would lead 28–9 at half-time, and a nascent run in the second half made the final score 35–23 in favor of Los Angeles. Hart threw 22-of-41 for 291 yards for a touchdown and three interceptions while being sacked twice.

In 1976, he threw for a career high completion percentage of 56.2%, complementing that with 2,946 yards for 18 touchdowns and 13 interceptions, with the team going 10–4, becoming the only NFC team to ever miss the playoffs after winning ten games in a 14-game season (done due to losing twice to the 10–4 Washington Redskins). The 1977 season proved a doomed one in mediocrity for Hart and the Cardinals. They were 7–3 with just four games to play and a narrow lead for a potential wild card spot in the postseason. However, a 55–14 drubbing at home to the Miami Dolphins proved to be the harbinger of a four-game losing streak that doomed the team to a 7–7 record and out of the playoffs (Coryell would leave the team after the season). Hart was named to the Pro Bowl despite the disappointment, having thrown for 2,542 yards with 13 touchdowns and 20 interceptions with a 52.4 completion percentage. It would be the last season where the Cardinals had a .500% or better year with Hart at the helm. In the next four seasons, Hart would start in 52 of the 64 games played and went 17–35 as a starter, throwing a combined 52 touchdowns and 72 interceptions for 9,979 yards and a 52.3 completion percentage, while being sacked 100 times (Hart would be sacked 243 times in total for a career).

For 1982, Neil Lomax was positioned as the quarterback for the future for the Cardinals, and Hart made mop-up appearances in four games that year, throwing one touchdown with 199 yards passing in 19-of-33 combined passing. Hart did not play when the Cardinals made it to the playoffs. 1983 was Hart's last season with the team. After Lomax was taken out in the midst of the season opener loss (whereupon Hart threw 11-of-20 for 141 yards), Hart would be the starter for three of the next four games. Hart's final start as a quarterback was on October 2 against the Kansas City Chiefs. He would throw 5-of-13 for 33 yards and three interceptions before being taken out for Rusty Lisch. Hart was signed by the Redskins to back up Joe Theismann for the 1984 season, playing little in that season before retiring in the off-season. However, Hart did make it into one footnote of history, as his appearance into the October 7th game was his 200th appearance in the quarterback position, making him the 10th quarterback to ever do so.

In his career, he was also selected to the Pro Bowl four times. In the 1977 Pro Bowl, Hart threw five interceptions, the most in the Pro Bowl's history. He went 87–88–5 in his career, was sacked 243 times, and played in 201 games. As of 2021, he was 25th in passing yards, 29th in victories, 34th in completions, and 32nd in passing touchdowns, though he is 10th in passes intercepted (including a 30-interception season in 1967, the sixth player in history to achieve this dubious benchmark), 73rd in being sacked, and 161st in Passer rating. He has the most passing attempts, completions, yards, touchdowns, interceptions (both career and single season), wins, and losses as a Cardinal.

Hart was named the NFC Player of the Year by UPI, All-NFC and second-team All-Pro for the 1974 season. Hart was inducted into the Missouri Sports Hall of Fame in 1998 for his contribution to the sport of football.

== NFL career statistics ==
Legend
	Led the league
**Bold**	Career high

=== Regular season ===
Year	Team	Games			Passing								
Year	Team	GP	GS	Record	Cmp	Att	Pct	Yds	Avg	TD	Int	Lng	Rtg
1966	STL	1	0	–	4	11	36.4	29	2.6	0	**0**	15	44.9
1967	STL	14	14	6–7–1	192	397	48.4	3,008	**7.6**	19	**30**	76	58.4
1968	STL	13	12	8−3–1	140	316	44.3	2,059	6.5	15	18	80	58.2
1969	STL	9	5	2−3	84	169	49.7	1,086	6.4	6	12	60	52.5
1970	STL	14	14	8−5–1	171	373	45.8	2,575	6.9	14	18	79	61.5
1971	STL	11	9	2–6–1	110	243	45.3	1,626	6.7	8	14	57	54.7
1972	STL	6	3	2–1	60	119	50.4	857	7.2	5	5	**98**	70.6
1973	STL	12	12	3–8–1	178	320	55.6	2,223	6.9	15	10	69	80.0
1974	STL	14	14	10−4	200	388	51.5	2,411	6.2	**20**	8	80	79.5
1975	STL	14	14	**11−3**	182	345	52.8	2,507	7.3	19	19	80	71.7
1976	STL	14	14	10−4	218	388	56.2	2,946	**7.6**	18	13	77	**82.0**
1977	STL	14	14	7−7	186	355	52.4	2,542	7.2	13	20	69	64.3
1978	STL	15	15	6–9	**240**	**477**	50.3	**3,121**	6.5	16	18	74	66.7
1979	STL	14	13	3–10	194	378	51.3	2,218	5.9	9	20	51	55.2
1980	STL	15	15	5–10	228	425	53.6	2,946	6.9	16	20	69	68.6
1981	STL	10	9	3–6	134	241	55.6	1,694	7.0	11	14	58	68.7
1982	STL	4	0	–	19	33	**57.6**	199	6.0	1	**0**	22	85.3
1983	STL	5	3	1–2	50	91	54.9	592	6.5	4	8	39	53.0
1984	WAS	2	0	–	3	7	42.9	26	3.7	0	**0**	13	53.3
Career		201	180	87–88–5	2,593	5,076	51.1	34,665	6.8	209	247	98	66.6

== Personal life ==
In 1983, Hart and teammate Dan Dierdorf opened up Dierdorf and Hart's Steak House. The steakhouse closed in 2013 after 30 years of operation.

Hart broadcast games on WGN with Dick Butkus after his retirement until 1989.

In 1989, Hart became the athletic director for Southern Illinois University Carbondale, serving until a chancellor changeover forced him out in 1999.

Hart has been married to his college sweetheart for over 40 years; he has three children and four grandchildren and some nieces and nephews. He resides in Naples, Florida, and often participates in charity golf tournaments.
