= George Franklin =

American football player (born 1954)

No. 40
- Position: Running back

Personal information
- Born: July 5, 1954 (age 72); Seguin, Texas, U.S.
- Listed height: 6 ft 3 in (1.91 m)
- Listed weight: 225 lb (102 kg)

Career information
- High school: Sam Houston (TX)
- College: Texas A&M-Kingsville
- NFL draft: 1977: 2nd round, 47th overall pick

Career history
- Atlanta Falcons (1978); New York Giants (1979)

Career NFL statistics
- Receptions: 1
- Receiving yards: 19
- Return yards: 258
- Stats at Pro Football Reference

George Eugene Franklin (born July 5, 1954) is an American former professional football player who was a running back for the Atlanta Falcons of the National Football League (NFL) in 1978. He played college football for the Texas A&M-Kingsville Javelinas.
