= Jim Bakken =

American football player (born 1940)

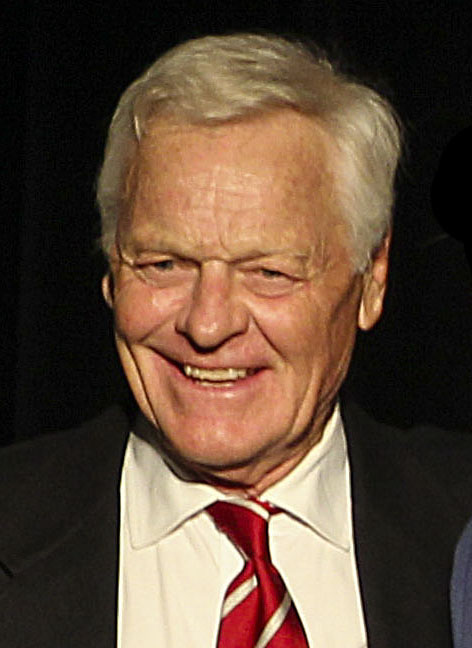
- Bakken c. 2015

No. 25
- Position: Kicker

Personal information
- Born: November 2, 1940 (age 86); Madison, Wisconsin, U.S.
- Listed height: 5 ft 11 in (1.80 m)
- Listed weight: 200 lb (91 kg)

Career information
- High school: Madison West
- College: Wisconsin
- NFL draft: 1962: 7th round, 88th overall pick

Career history
- Los Angeles Rams (1962)*; St. Louis Cardinals (1962–1978)
- * Offseason or practice squad member only

Awards and highlights
- 2× First-team All-Pro (1975, 1976); 4× Pro Bowl (1965, 1967, 1975, 1976); NFL scoring leader (1967); NFL 1960s All-Decade Team; NFL 1970s All-Decade Team

Career NFL statistics
- Field goals attempted: 447
- Field goals made: 282
- Field goal percentage: 63.1%
- Longest field goal: 51
- Extra points attempted: 553
- Extra points made: 534
- Extra point percentage: 96.6%
- Points scored: 1,380
- Stats at Pro Football Reference

James LeRoy Bakken (born November 2, 1940) is an American former professional football player who was a kicker in the National Football League (NFL) for the St. Louis Cardinals, playing occasionally as a punter as well. He was a four-time Pro Bowl selection and was named to the NFL 1960s and 1970s All-Decade Team. Bakken is one of 29 individuals to be named to two All-Decade teams.

== Early life ==
Bakken was born on November 2, 1940, in Madison, Wisconsin. He attended Madison West High School in Madison, graduating in 1958. He was on the football, basketball and baseball teams. The 1957 football team went undefeated (8–0), and was considered the best high school team in Wisconsin that year. In the same year, Bakken was Most Valuable Player (MVP) of the Big 8 Conference, and the All-State quarterback. He was All-State in baseball and basketball as well at Madison West.

== College career ==
He went on to play three seasons of varsity football at the University of Wisconsin (1959–61). He played football under coach Milt Bruhn. As a sophomore, Bakken shared the quarterback position with Dale Hackbart, and was also the team's kicker and punter. Bakken's 1959 Badger team was Big-Ten Conference champion, and played in the 1960 Rose Bowl. He was honorable mention All-Big Ten that year.

In 1960, he became the first punter in school history to average more than 40 yards per punt (41.9); and was seventh in the nation in punting average. In 1961, he was team co-captain. He led the Big Ten in punting average in 1960 and 1961. In a 1961 game against Northwestern, he had a 90-yard punt, 47-yard field goal, and returned an interception for a touchdown, in the Badgers' upset victory.

He also played one year of baseball for the Badgers.

He was named to the Madison (Wisconsin) Sports Hall of Fame in 1984, and was inducted into the UW Athletic Department-National W Club Hall of Fame in 2001.

== Professional career ==
Bakken was drafted by the Los Angeles Rams in the seventh round of the 1962 NFL draft. He did not make the team and was instead picked up by the St. Louis Cardinals, where he played his entire NFL career. He played 17 seasons, scoring a total of 1,380 points while never missing a game between 1963 and 1978; playing 234 consecutive games. Only Larry Fitzgerald has played more games for the Cardinals. In the first fifty seasons of the NFL (1920–1969), for all field goal kickers with 200 field goal attempts, Bakken ranked 1st at 61.5, having made 134 of his 218 attempts.

At the time he retired, his 1,380 points were second-most in AFL/NFL history (behind only George Blanda). When he retired, his 282 field goals were third most in NFL history (behind only George Blanda and Jim Turner). He cracked the 100-point threshold in a season three times (1964, 1967, and 1973), making him one of fifteen players with three 100-point seasons at the time. He was selected to kick in the Pro Bowl four times, which at the time made him one of three primary kickers to make the Pro Bowl four times. He led the NFL in made field goals in 1964 and 1967, as well as in scoring in 1967 (117 points). He remains the Cardinals all-time leading scorer (as of 2025). Bakken is the AFL/NFL's 39th leading scorer (as of 2025).

He was selected first-team All-Conference in 1975 and 1976, and first-team All-Pro by the Newspaper Enterprise Association (NEA), Pro Football Writers, and Pro Football Weekly both of those years. In 1976, he was selected as the Cardinals' MVP. In 1969, he was president of the National Football League Players Association (NFLPA).

Bakken was the first NFL kicker to attempt nine field goals and successfully convert seven in a Week 2 28–14 win over the Pittsburgh Steelers at Pitt Stadium on September 24, 1967. That single-game field goal record was broken by Rob Bironas with eight in a game in 2007.

His nickname with the Cardinals was "Bags".

== Legacy and honors ==
Bakken was named by the voters of the Pro Football Hall of Fame to the Professional Football 1960s All Decade Team, which included both NFL and American Football League players. The voters of the Pro Football Hall of Fame also selected Bakken to the NFL 1970s All-Decade Team, second-team, one vote behind Garo Yepremian.

He is a member of the St. Louis Sports Hall of Fame. The Missouri Athletic Club selected him Sportsman of the Year in 1976.

In December 2010, the annual trophy for the Big Ten's best kicker, the "Bakken-Andersen Kicker of the Year" award, was co-named in his honor.

== Personal life ==
In 1985 Baaken was appointed athletic director at St. Louis University and was employed there for several years. In 1990, Bakken was hired as director of external relations at the University of Wisconsin's athletic department.

Bakken was the Wisconsin State Masters Handball Doubles Champion seven times (1991–1997).

== Career regular season statistics ==
Career high/best bolded

Regular season statistics
Season	Team (record)	G	FGM	FGA	%	<20	20-29	30-39	40-49	50+	LNG	BLK	XPM	XPA	%	PTS
1962	STL (4–9–1)	8	0	1	0.0	N/A	N/A	N/A	N/A	N/A	0	0	0	0	0.0	0
1963	STL (9–5)	14	11	21	52.4	N/A	N/A	N/A	N/A	N/A	45	0	**44**	**44**	**100.0**	77
1964	STL (9–3–2)	14	25	38	65.8	N/A	N/A	N/A	N/A	N/A	51	0	40	40	**100.0**	115
1965	STL (5–9)	14	21	31	67.7	N/A	N/A	N/A	N/A	N/A	45	0	33	33	**100.0**	96
1966	STL (8–5–1)	14	23	**40**	57.5	**8–8**	7–8	4–8	4–12	0–4	47	0	27	28	96.4	96
1967	STL (6–7–1)	14	**27**	39	69.2	**8–8**	8–9	8–11	3–10	0–1	47	0	36	36	**100.0**	**117**
1968	STL (9–4–1)	14	15	24	62.5	2–2	7–7	3–6	3–8	0–1	47	0	40	40	**100.0**	85
1969	STL (4–9–1)	14	12	24	50.0	2–2	4–8	3–4	3–7	0–3	46	0	38	40	95.0	74
1970	STL (8–5–1)	14	20	32	62.5	4–4	3–6	7–7	6–11	0–4	49	0	37	38	97.4	97
1971	STL (4–9–1)	14	21	32	65.6	5–5	8–13	5–6	3–8	0–0	45	0	24	24	**100.0**	87
1972	STL (4–9–1)	14	14	22	63.6	4–5	2–5	2–3	6–9	0–0	49	0	19	21	90.5	61
1973	STL (4–9–1)	14	23	32	71.9	4–4	6–7	**10–12**	3–8	0–1	46	0	31	31	**100.0**	100
1974	STL (10–4)	14	13	22	59.1	0–0	2–3	5–9	**6–10**	0–0	47	0	30	36	83.3	69
1975	STL (11–3)	14	19	24	**79.2**	0–0	**10–11**	5–7	4–6	0–0	48	0	40	41	97.6	97
1976	STL (10–4)	14	20	27	74.1	0–0	**10–11**	6–8	4–8	0–0	43	0	33	35	94.3	93
1977	STL (7–7)	14	7	16	43.8	0–0	2–2	3–5	2–8	0–1	49	0	35	36	97.2	56
1978	STL (6–10)	16	11	22	50.0	0–0	4–5	4–7	3–10	0–0	45	0	27	30	90.0	60
Career (17 seasons)		234	282	447	63.1	37–38	73–95	65–93	50–115	0–15	51	0	534	553	96.6	1380

== See also ==
- List of most consecutive starts and games played by National Football League players
