= St. Louis Cardinals (NFL) =

Former National Football League franchise in St. Louis, Missouri (1960–1987)

Logo
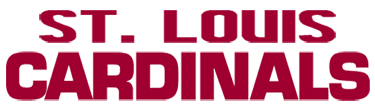
Wordmark

General information
- Founded: 1960
- Folded: 1987
- Headquartered: St. Louis, Missouri
- Colors: Cardinal red, white, black

Personnel
- Owners: Violet Bidwill (1960–1962); Bill Bidwill (1962–1987)
- General manager: James Carter (1977–1987)
- Head coach: Pop Ivy (1960–1961); Wally Lemm (1962–1965); Charley Winner (1966–1970); Bob Hollway (1971–1972); Don Coryell (1973–1977); Bud Wilkinson (1978–1979); Larry Wilson (1979); Jim Hanifan (1980–1985); Gene Stallings (1986–1987)

Nicknames
- Gridbirds; Cardiac Cards; Big Red; Football Cardinals

Team history
- Morgan Athletic Club (1898); Racine Normals (1899–1900); Racine Street Cardinals (1901–1905, 1913–1917, 1919–1921); Suspended operations (1906–1912, 1918); Chicago Cardinals (1922–1943, 1945–1959); Card-Pitt (1944); St. Louis Cardinals (1960–1987); Phoenix Cardinals (1988–1993); Arizona Cardinals (1994–present)

Home fields
- Busch Stadium (1960–1965); Busch Memorial Stadium (1966–1987)

League / conference affiliations
- National Football League (1960–1987): Eastern Conference (1960–1969); Century Division (1967–1969); National Football Conference (1970–1987); NFC East (1970–1987)

Championships
- Division championships: 2: NFC East: 1974, 1975

Playoff appearances (4)
- NFL: 1964, 1974, 1975, 1982

From 1960 to 1987, the professional American football team known since as the Arizona Cardinals played in St. Louis, Missouri, as the St. Louis Cardinals.

The team moved from Chicago to St. Louis in 1960, and played their first home game there on October 2 at Busch Stadium against the New York Giants. Their last home game in St. Louis, played at Busch Memorial Stadium on December 13, 1987, was also against the Giants. Their last game as a St. Louis–based club was on December 27, 1987, at the Dallas Cowboys.

During the Cardinals' 28 years in St. Louis, they advanced to the playoffs just four times (1964, 1974, 1975, and 1982), and never hosted a playoff game. Their only postseason win came in the 1964 Playoff Bowl.

Their winning percentage of .481 during their time in St. Louis—187 victories, 202 losses, and 13 ties—is better than those in the other two cities the Cardinals have called home.

The team moved to Tempe, Arizona, in 1988.

== 1947–1973 ==
In 1947, Chicago Cardinals owner Charles Bidwill died, leaving the team to his wife Violet. Two years later, she married St. Louis businessman Walter Wolfner.

The Cardinals won the NFL championship in 1947, and narrowly missed defending it in 1948. However, they would have only two more winning seasons in the next 11 years. By the end of the 1959 season, the Cardinals barely even registered on Chicago's sports scene, and were seemingly on an irreversible slide toward bankruptcy. The Wolfners reluctantly decided to cede Chicago to their bitter rivals, the Bears, and move elsewhere.

A move to Walter's hometown of St. Louis appeared to make sense. The NFL examined St. Louis, and concluded that it could support a team. However, it insisted that the Wolfners pay a stiff relocation fee. Needing cash for the fee, and additional capital in any event, the Wolfners considered offers from various out-of-town investors. Among the suitors were Texas oil magnates Lamar Hunt and Bud Adams, Denver minor league baseball owner Bob Howsam, and Minneapolis Lakers part-owner Max Winter. In every case, negotiations foundered when the Wolfners insisted on maintaining controlling interest.

In response, Hunt and Adams joined forces with several other businessmen, including Howsam and Winter, to found the American Football League. Suddenly faced with a serious rival, the NFL quickly came to terms with the Wolfners, engineering a deal that allowed them to move to St. Louis for the 1960 season. This not only avoided the embarrassment of losing one of the NFL's oldest franchises, but locked the upstart league out of St. Louis.

=== 1960s ===
On March 13, 1960, the league's 12 owners unanimously approved the Cardinals' move to St. Louis, ending the team's 62-year history and 40 NFL seasons in Chicago. In addition to the NFL's blessing, the Bidwills sought permission from the long-established baseball team in their new city to share the "Cardinals" nickname. Other cities had hosted football teams that copied the local baseball team's name, but the Cardinals were (and remain) the only American team with a long-established nickname that moved to a city where another major sports franchise coincidentally had the same long-established name and kept it. (The Cincinnati Royals moved to Kansas City twelve years later, but altered the name to avoid confusion in their new home.)

During the Cardinals' tenure in St. Louis, they were locally called the "Big Red", the "Football Cardinals", or "the Gridbirds" in order to avoid confusion with the baseball team.

The Cardinals played in the original Busch Stadium as tenants of the baseball team. St. Louis had not had a professional football team since the early days of the NFL. For decades, the NFL had demanded a modern stadium as a condition for returning to the city. Busch Stadium had been built in its final form in 1909, and had not been well maintained from the 1930s until the baseball Cardinals bought it in 1953. However, the prospect of competition with the AFL compelled them to approve the Cardinals' move in exchange for a pledge to eventually build a new venue. In the meantime, the football Cardinals would be playing for at least a few years in a stadium that was barely suitable even for temporary use. Busch Stadium was not designed for football, and had poor and outdated infrastructure. In particular, parking was virtually nonexistent. It was also located in a neighborhood that had already gone to seed. Moreover, the baseball team had priority for scheduling. Under these circumstances, tickets proved difficult to sell. The Cardinals initially held practices in the city park. In 1961, they finished .500 at 7–7, but after the NFL had expanded to a 14-game season to compete with the upstart AFL, the team fell to 4–9–1 in 1962. Although improving to 9–5–0 in 1963, a loss to the Giants kept them out of the NFL title game.

The Cardinals were competitive for much of the 1960s. New stars emerged in Larry Wilson, Charley Johnson, Jim Bakken, Sonny Randle, and Jim Hart. Violet Bidwill Wolfner died in 1962, and her sons, Bill and Charles, Jr. took control. Although the Cardinals made a good account of themselves in their first decade in St. Louis, they never won their conference, a prerequisite for playing in the NFL championship game during this decade. In those days, the conference champions advanced directly to the championship game, with no playoff round.

In 1964, the Cardinals got off to a good start, going undefeated in their first four games (all on the road), their only blemish being a 33-33 tie against the Cleveland Browns. However, the Cardinals were then forced to play what was supposed to be their home opener against the Baltimore Colts at Memorial Stadium when their landlords reached the World Series. Under the terms of their lease, the football Cardinals could not use Busch Stadium until the baseball Cardinals' season was finished. They lost to the Colts 47-27 in Baltimore. The defeat in the extra road game proved painfully decisive as while St. Louis finished 9–4–1 and second in the Eastern Conference (enough to qualify for a postseason game) a victory by the Browns over the New York Giants denied them a championship berth by a mere half game. The team finished the year with a Playoff Bowl win over the Packers by a score of 24-17 to finish third place. At the time, it was the franchise's only postseason win in St. Louis; it has since been retconned as an exhibition game.

By 1964, the Bidwills were disappointed with the progress of the new downtown stadium and considered moving the team to Atlanta. St. Louis city leaders provided some incentives, which combined with groundbreaking at a new stadium later that year persuaded them to stay. While the football team would continue to be tenants in the new facility, they received better lease terms. Furthermore, the new venue was a "cookie-cutter" multipurpose stadium, considered state-of-the-art at the time and designed from the outset to readily accommodate both baseball and football. The new stadium would eventually be completed in 1966 and be named Busch Memorial Stadium after the owner of the baseball team. A new expansion team, the Falcons of the NFL, was eventually created for Atlanta and began play in 1966, while a different St. Louis team would move to Atlanta: the NBA Hawks in 1968.

A 4–1–0 start to the 1965 season evaporated into a 5–9–0 finish. Starting quarterback Charley Johnson struggled most of the season with a shoulder injury and defensive leader Larry Wilson missed games with broken hands.

In 1966 (the team's first in the newly opened Busch Memorial Stadium), the Cardinals had a new head coach in Charley Winner. They were in first place in the Eastern Conference with a 7-1–1 record, but Johnson suffered a season-ending injury against the Giants and the Cardinals lost four of their last five games leaving them out of the playoffs. The 1966 season saw the debut of first-round draft pick Johnny Roland who gained 908 yards from scrimmage and was named NFL Rookie of the Year.

In 1967, Johnson was summoned to active duty in the Army. This opened the door for Jim Hart who was signed as an undrafted free agent out of Southern Illinois University the previous season. Hart threw for over 3000 yards and 19 touchdowns in 1967, but the team finished with six wins, seven losses, and one tie.

Meanwhile, the NFL expanded to four divisions. It also eschewed one-game playoffs as tiebreakers in favor of pro football's first guaranteed multi-game postseason scheme. Under the second season of the new format, the Cardinals won on the road against the Cleveland Browns to give them a critical advantage under the newly-devised tiebreakers. However, a tie against the woeful Pittsburgh Steelers eventually ensured the Cardinals would miss the playoffs. St. Louis still beat Cleveland at home to complete the season sweep and end the year with a 9–4–1 mark, which was better than two other NFL playoff teams but a half game behind the Browns.

St. Louis fell back to 4–9–1 in 1969, but that season saw the debut of Roger Wehrli, a star safety at the University of Missouri who played 14 seasons for the Cardinals and was elected to the Pro Football Hall of Fame in 2007.

=== Early 1970s ===
In 1970, the NFL and AFL completed their merger, and the Cardinals were placed in the new NFC East division. They posted three consecutive shutouts in November, blanking the Oilers, Patriots, and the Cowboys, the latter a 38–0 victory on Monday Night Football in the Cotton Bowl. But St. Louis collapsed down the stretch, losing December games to the New York Giants, Detroit Lions, and Washington Redskins to finish 8–5–1 and out of the playoffs. The Cardinals then regressed to three consecutive 4–9–1 seasons from 1971 to 1973. Bill Bidwill became sole owner in 1972; he would own the team until his death in 2019. Only the New York Giants and Chicago Bears have been in the hands of one family longer than the Cardinals.

Head Coach Bob Hollway was fired after consecutive 4-9-1 seasons in 1971 and 1972. 1972 season; he was replaced the following year by Don Coryell, who had built a powerhouse program at San Diego State.

== 1974–1977 ==
The Cardinals raced out a 7–0 record to open the 1974 season and won the NFC East championship — their first division or conference title since their unsuccessful title defense of 1948 — by a season sweep of the Redskins. Normally, this would have assured the Cardinals of their first home playoff game since the 1947 championship season. However, they did not receive homefield advantage; under the NFL playoff format of the day, the venue of first round games simply rotated among division champions and in 1974 it was the NFC East champion's turn to go on the road. A victory in the first round would have brought the NFC Championship Game to St. Louis, but this was not to be. While the Cardinals took an early 7–0 lead against the Minnesota Vikings in Bloomington, Minnesota, a missed field goal just before halftime sapped their momentum. The Vikings scored 16 points in the first seven minutes of the second half and cruised to a 30–14 victory.

The Cardinals repeated as NFC East champions in 1975, but were once again denied homefield advantage in the first round. The playoff format had been changed before the season to ensure that the two division champions with the best records in each conference earned homefield advantage in the divisional round – as it happened, the Cardinals had the worst record of the NFC division champions. The playoff game against the Los Angeles Rams was a disaster: Lawrence McCutcheon set an NFL playoff record by rushing for 202 yards, and Jack Youngblood and Bill Simpson returned interceptions for touchdowns, staking the Rams to a 28–9 halftime lead en route to a 35–23 victory at the Los Angeles Memorial Coliseum. The defeat ultimately cost the Cardinals yet another chance to host the NFC Championship Game, as their division rival Cowboys ended up beating the NFC Central champion Vikings the next day in Bloomington.

During this period, the Cardinals boasted an effective offense in the wake of a record setting offensive line which included standouts Dan Dierdorf, Conrad Dobler, and Tom Banks.

This period for the franchise was characterized by exciting close games, come from behind nailbiters, and several frustrating near misses. The press and league fans began to call the team the "Cardiac Cardinals". Team stars from the 1970s included Wehrli, wide receiver Mel Gray, and running backs Terry Metcalf and Jim Otis.

On Thanksgiving 1976, the Cardinals suffered a controversial loss to the Dallas Cowboys. Cardinals tight end J. V. Cain, running an apparent game winning route, was shoved out of the end zone by Dallas safeties Cliff Harris and Charlie Waters in what appeared to be obvious interference, but a penalty was not called. With this loss, the Cardinals were dethroned from the divisional lead and became the first NFC team to reach 10 wins without qualifying for the playoffs. Ultimately, the Cardinals would become the only 10-win NFC team to miss the playoffs under a 14-game schedule. It was the Redskins' sweep of the season series that kept them out of the playoffs.

In 1977, the Cardinals started slowly but won 6 consecutive games before losing the Thanksgiving Day game to the Miami Dolphins, 55–14. Bob Griese's record setting day turned out to be the first of 12 straight losses for the Cardinals (extending into 1978), a streak which included being only the second team ever to lose to the previously winless Tampa Bay Buccaneers, and the first to lose in Tampa Stadium. Coryell and several key players, including Dobler and Metcalf, departed the team at the end of the 1977 season.

== 1978–1985: Decline ==
For the 1978 season, Bidwill hired Bud Wilkinson, famous for building a football dynasty in 17 seasons at the University of Oklahoma. But Wilkinson, who had been out of coaching since retiring from the Sooners after the 1963 season, could not turn the Cardinals around. St. Louis started 1978 with eight straight losses and finished at 6–10, and Wilkinson was fired in 1979 with the Cardinals at 3–10 and last in the NFC East. Wilkinson was canned by Bidwill for refusing to bench quarterback Jim Hart in favor of rookie Steve Pisarkiewicz. Larry Wilson, the Pro Football Hall of Fame safety who starred for the Cardinals for 13 seasons, coached the final three games of the 1979 season, finishing with a 5–11 record.

The Cardinals experienced several years of notoriously poor drafts and unfortunate personnel moves in the late 1970s, typified by the first-round selection of kicker Steve Little, who was paralyzed in a 1980 automobile accident, and hiring Wilkinson in 1978. The team also suffered a tragic loss during the 1979 training camp when Cain died of a heart attack.

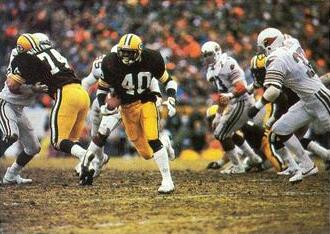
The Cardinals playing against the Packers in the 1982 NFC First Round Playoff game.

However, the Cardinals had some success in the early 1980s, posting three consecutive winning seasons from 1982 to 1984. The heart of this squad was the prolific trio of quarterback Neil Lomax, wide receiver Roy Green, and running back Ottis Anderson. Stellar performances by Anderson could not salvage the Cardinals' 1980 and 1981 campaigns, which ended at 5–11 and 7–9, respectively.

In the strike-shortened 1982 season, the Cardinals finished 5–4, which was nevertheless good enough to qualify for the team's first postseason appearance since 1975 due to the expanded 16-team playoff field. However, the Cardinals were trounced 41–16 by the Green Bay Packers

While the Cardinals managed to follow up the abbreviated 1982 campaign with two more winning seasons, they would not reach the playoffs again as a St. Louis team. St. Louis finished 1983 at 8–7–1, including victories over the eventual Super Bowl champion Los Angeles Raiders and the Seattle Seahawks, who lost to the Raiders in the AFC championship game; the team also lost in meetings between the two NFC Championship game participants, the NFC champion Washington Redskins and their opponent, the San Francisco 49ers.

The Cardinals entered the final weekend of 1984 with a chance to win the NFC East by defeating the Redskins, but Neil O'Donoghue missed a game-winning field goal at the gun, giving Washington a 29–27 victory and the division championship; the team finished 9–7 and missed the playoffs.

The Cardinals would not have another winning season before leaving St. Louis. The team started 1985 3–1, but finished 5–11, leading to the termination of coach Jim Hanifan after six seasons. Hanifan would return triumphantly to St. Louis 14 years later, serving as offensive line coach during the St. Louis Rams' Super Bowl championship season in 1999.

== 1986–1987: Final seasons in St. Louis ==
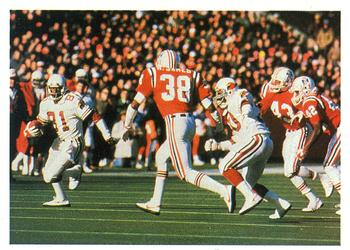
The Cardinals playing against the Patriots in 1984.

Gene Stallings, formerly the head coach at Texas A&M and a long time assistant to Tom Landry with the Cowboys, replaced Hanifan. The Cardinals finished 4–11–1 in 1986, but improved to 7–8 in 1987, falling just one win shy of the playoffs, losing 21–16 on the final Sunday of the season to the Cowboys.

The 1987 season is remembered for a stunning comeback, rallying from a 28–3 deficit against the Buccaneers by scoring 28 points in the fourth quarter for a 31–28 victory. It remains the largest fourth-quarter comeback in NFL history.

By this point Busch Stadium, despite being barely twenty years old, was increasingly regarded as being obsolete and outmoded. For most of the Cardinals' tenure there, it was one of the smallest stadiums in the league. At its height, it only seated 54,000 people, just barely over the post-merger minimum capacity for a stadium.

While NFL teams increasingly demanded modern football-specific venues, there was little political will at the time to publicly finance a new football-only stadium for the St. Louis Cardinals. The overall mediocrity of the Cardinals, combined with a stadium now seen as inadequate, caused game attendance to dwindle, and once again the Bidwills decided to move the team. The three destinations most seriously considered were Baltimore (which had lost the Colts to Indianapolis in 1984) along with Phoenix and Jacksonville (which, along with Baltimore, had demonstrated relatively strong and persistent fan support for the then-recently-disbanded United States Football League). Nonetheless, Cardinals fans were unhappy at losing their team, and Bill Bidwill, fearing for his safety, stayed away from several of the 1987 home games. Their last home game was on December 13, 1987, in which the Cardinals won 27–24 over the New York Giants in front of 29,623 fans on a late Sunday afternoon.

In the days leading up to that three-point win over the Giants, there would be at least one more interested suitor--albeit briefly: Columbus, Ohio. On December 3, Bidwill entertained Buck Rinehart, Columbus's then-mayor, for an impromptu meeting. At that time, Ohio had two NFL teams, the Cincinnati Bengals and the Cleveland Browns. However, Rinehart's idea might well have been ahead of its time. During the 1993 NFL season, the Bengals would seriously consider relocation to Baltimore at the end of the year. Two years later, the Browns would do what the Bengals did not, albeit through a complex agreement.

On March 15, 1988, the NFL team owners voted to allow Bidwill to move the Cardinals from St. Louis to Tempe, Arizona, for the 1988 NFL season. Both Jacksonville and Baltimore later got NFL teams of their own (in Baltimore's case, it was a return of the NFL) when the Jaguars began play in 1995, and the Ravens controversially started in 1996 respectively. The last active player on the Cardinals to have played in St. Louis was Luis Sharpe, who retired in 1994 while the last active player for the St. Louis Cardinals in the NFL was Ray Brown, who retired in 2006.

== NFL return to and departure from St. Louis ==
The NFL returned to St. Louis in 1995, when the Los Angeles Rams moved there. The Rams would go on to win Super Bowl XXXIV in 2000 against the Tennessee Titans, becoming the first NFL team to win a championship in three different cities (previously in Cleveland, Ohio, in 1945 and Los Angeles, California, in 1951). Due to the NFL's scheduling rotation, the Arizona Cardinals only played one game in St. Louis prior to 2002, a 20-17 win over the Rams at Trans World Dome.

The Cardinals and Rams became divisional rivals in 2002 when the NFL changed from six divisions to eight; this ensured that the Cardinals, now in the NFC West, played one regular season game in St. Louis annually until the 2015 season, after which the Rams moved back to Los Angeles. During this time, the Cardinals would finally appear in their first Super Bowl, in which they lost to the Pittsburgh Steelers.

With the Rams' move back to Los Angeles, St. Louis became the first city to have lost two NFL teams to the western United States. The Rams would go on to win their second championship in Los Angeles at Super Bowl LVI in 2022, defeating the Cincinnati Bengals.

== Season records ==
Season	Team	League	Conference	Division	Regular season				Postseason	Awards
Season	Team	League	Conference	Division	Finish	Wins	Losses	Ties	Postseason	Awards
St. Louis Cardinals
1960	1960	NFL	Eastern		4th	6	5	1		
1961	1961	NFL	Eastern		4th	7	7	0		
1962	1962	NFL	Eastern		6th	4	9	1		
1963	1963	NFL	Eastern		3rd	9	5	0		
1964	1964	NFL	Eastern		2nd	9	3	2	Won Playoff Bowl (vs. Packers) 24–17	
1965	1965	NFL	Eastern		T-5th	5	9	0		
1966	1966	NFL	Eastern		4th	8	5	1		
1967	1967	NFL	Eastern	Century	3rd	6	7	1		
1968	1968	NFL	Eastern	Century	2nd	9	4	1		
1969	1969	NFL	Eastern	Century	3rd	4	9	1		
1970	1970	NFL	NFC	East	3rd	8	5	1		
1971	1971	NFL	NFC	East	4th	4	9	1		
1972	1972	NFL	NFC	East	4th	4	9	1		
1973	1973	NFL	NFC	East	4th	4	9	1		
1974	1974	NFL	NFC	East	1st	10	4	0	Lost Divisional Playoffs (at Vikings) 14–30	Don Coryell (COY)
1975	1975	NFL	NFC	East	1st	11	3	0	Lost Divisional Playoffs (at Rams) 23–35	
1976	1976	NFL	NFC	East	3rd	10	4	0		
1977	1977	NFL	NFC	East	3rd	7	7	0		
1978	1978	NFL	NFC	East	4th	6	10	0		
1979	1979	NFL	NFC	East	5th	5	11	0		Ottis Anderson (OROY)
1980	1980	NFL	NFC	East	4th	5	11	0		
1981	1981	NFL	NFC	East	5th	7	9	0		
1982	1982	NFL	NFC		6th	5	4	0	Lost First round (at Packers) 16–41	
1983	1983	NFL	NFC	East	3rd	8	7	1		
1984	1984	NFL	NFC	East	3rd	9	7	0		
1985	1985	NFL	NFC	East	5th	5	11	0		
1986	1986	NFL	NFC	East	5th	4	11	1		
1987	1987	NFL	NFC	East	3rd	7	8	0		
Totals 2 division titles						186	202	14	St. Louis Cardinals regular season record (1960–1987)	

== Notable players ==
=== Pro Football Hall of Famers ===
St. Louis Cardinals Hall of Famers
No.	Player	Position(s)	Tenure	Inducted
8	Larry Wilson	FS	1960–1972	1978
13	Don Maynard	WR	1973	1987
22	Roger Wehrli	CB	1969–1982	2007
72	Dan Dierdorf	OT	1971–1983	1996
81	Jackie Smith	TE	1963–1978	1994
-	Don Coryell	Head coach	1973–1977	2023

Italics = played a portion of career with the Cardinals and enshrined representing another team.
Dierdorf, Smith, Wehrli and Wilson were members of the St. Louis Football Ring of Fame in The Dome at America's Center when the Rams played there from 1995 to 2015.

=== Retired numbers ===
St. Louis Cardinals retired numbers
N°	Player	Position	Tenure	Retired
8	Larry Wilson	S	1960–1972	1970
88	J. V. Cain ^{1}	TE	1974–1978	1979

Notes:

- ^{1} Posthumously retired.

== See also ==
- History of the St. Louis Rams
