= Bob Crum =

American football player (born 1951)

No. 65
- Position: Defensive end

Personal information
- Born: June 28, 1951 (age 75); Mesa, Arizona, U.S.
- Listed height: 6 ft 5 in (1.96 m)
- Listed weight: 240 lb (109 kg)

Career information
- High school: Sunnyslope (Phoenix, Arizona)
- College: Arizona
- NFL draft: 1973: 3rd round, 67th overall pick

Career history
- Cleveland Browns (1973)*; Houston Oilers (1973)*; St. Louis Cardinals (1973–1974)
- * Offseason or practice squad member only
- Stats at Pro Football Reference

Robert Harvey Crum (born June 28, 1951) is an American former professional football defensive end who played for the St. Louis Cardinals of the National Football League (NFL). He played college football for the Arizona Wildcats and was selected by the Cleveland Browns in the third round of the 1973 NFL draft.

== Early life ==
Robert Harvey Crum was born on June 28, 1951, in Mesa, Arizona. He attended Sunnyslope High School in Phoenix, Arizona.

== College career ==
Crum enrolled at the University of Arizona to play college football for the Wildcats. He was on the freshman team in 1969 and was a three-year letterman from 1970 to 1972.

== Professional career ==
Crum was selected by the Cleveland Browns in the third round, with the 67th overall pick, of the 1973 NFL draft. He signed with the team on April 12. Crum was impressed with the food at Browns training camp, stating "I swear every meal seems to be a 20-course banquet. They serve prime rib here that is cut thicker than a Tucson telephone book." He was waived on September 7, 1973, after the fifth of six preseason games.

Crum was claimed off waivers by the Houston Oilers, but later waived on September 10 before the start of the regular season.

Crum was claimed off waivers by the St. Louis Cardinals on September 11. However, he did not play in any games for the Cardinals during the 1973 season due to a shoulder injury. He appeared in all 14 games in 1974 as a reserve defensive end, recording one fumble recovery. On July 28, 1975, Crum was placed on the team's reserve list after not reporting to training camp. He had apparently retired.
