= 1985 Dallas Cowboys season =

NFL team season

- Owner: Bum Bright
- General manager: Tex Schramm
- Head coach: Tom Landry
- Defensive coordinator: Ernie Stautner
- Home stadium: Texas Stadium

Results
- Record: 10–6
- Division place: 1st NFC East
- Playoffs: Lost Divisional Playoffs (at Rams) 0–20
- Pro Bowlers: TE Doug Cosbie; WR Tony Hill; CB Everson Walls; DT Randy White

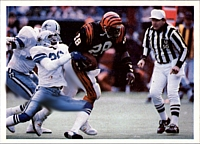
The Cowboys defensive backs in action against the Bengals in December 1985.

The 1985 Dallas Cowboys season was the franchise's 26th season in the National Football League. The Cowboys improved on their 9-7 record from 1984 and made the playoffs after a one-year absence. This marked the final postseason appearance for the Cowboys under Tom Landry and Bum Bright, where they were shut out 20–0 in the divisional playoff game to the Los Angeles Rams. The team holds the record for consecutive winning seasons with 20.

== Summary ==
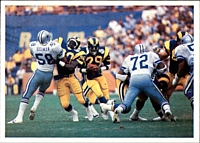
The Cowboys' defense attempting to stop Rams' running back Eric Dickerson (29) in the 1985-86 NFC Divisional Playoffs Game.

Tom Landry's team got off to a fast start, opening the season with 44–14 trouncing of their longtime nemesis, the Redskins, and later defeating the Steelers (their first victory over Pittsburgh since 1972) to give the team a 5–1 record and an early two-game lead over the rest of the division. However, the team was up and down the rest of the way, finishing out the season 5–5 and allowing both the Giants and Redskins to catch up with them at 10–6. Two wins each over both the Giants and Redskins allowed the Cowboys to win the division based on the tie-breaking rules. During the inconsistent stretch toward the end of the season, the Cowboys suffered two of the most embarrassing defeats in team history. On November 17, the undefeated Chicago Bears came to Texas Stadium and gave the Cowboys a 44–0 beating that was the 2nd worst loss in team history, and it was also the first time in 218 games that the Cowboys had not scored. Three weeks later the team traveled to Cincinnati, where the Bengals handed them a 50–24 loss, piling up 570 yards in the process, the most yards the Cowboys had given up in team history. The Cowboys proved to be a resilient bunch however, winning a crucial game at home against the Giants the following week that gave them their first division title since 1981, and the final for Tom Landry. That game would prove to be the last highlight of the season, as the team was shut out in the playoffs for the first time in team history, 20–0, by the Rams at Anaheim Stadium, which would prove to be the final playoff appearance for the Cowboys under Landry.

With the previous season's quarterback controversy behind him, Danny White led the Cowboys' passing game to number three overall in the league. Wide receiver Tony Hill posted career highs in receptions and receiving yards, and Mike Renfro blossomed in his second season with the Cowboys. Tight end Doug Cosbie had another Pro Bowl season. Turnovers proved to be a problem though, as White and backup quarterback Gary Hogeboom combined to throw 24 interceptions. Running back Tony Dorsett was the only reliable ball carrier on the roster, rushing for 1,307 yards on the season, and going over 10,000 yards for his career. On the defensive side of the ball, the Cowboys registered 62 sacks and 33 interceptions, with cornerback Everson Walls becoming the first player to ever lead the league in interceptions three times, with nine. The big plays covered up a pass defense that ranked 27th in the league, and a defense that ranked 23rd overall. The secondary allowed big plays through the air throughout the season, and the defense allowed running back Eric Dickerson to rush for a playoff record 248 yards in their playoff game against the Rams.

=== NFL draft ===
1985 Dallas Cowboys draft
Round	Pick	Player	Position	College	Notes
1	17	Kevin Brooks	DE	Michigan	
2	44	Jesse Penn	LB	Virginia Tech	
3	76	Crawford Ker	OG	Florida	
4	103	Robert Lavette	RB	Georgia Tech	
5	114	Herschel Walker *	RB	Georgia	
5	119	Matt Darwin	C	Texas A&M	He chose not to sign and enter the 1986 Draft
6	144	Kurt Ploeger	DE	Gustavus Adolphus	
6	157	Matt Moran	OG	Stanford	
7	178	Karl Powe	WR	Alabama State	
7	184	Jim Herrmann	DE	Brigham Young	
8	216	Leon Gonzalez	WR	Bethune-Cookman	
9	243	Scott Strasburger	LB	Nebraska	
10	270	Joe Jones	TE	Virginia Tech	
11	297	Neal Dellocono	LB	UCLA	
12	324	Karl Jordan	LB	Vanderbilt	
Made roster † Pro Football Hall of Fame * Made at least one Pro Bowl during career

=== Undrafted free agents ===
1985 undrafted free agents of note
Player	Position	College
Bryan Wagner	Punter	Cal State Northridge

== Personnel ==
=== Staff ===
1985 Dallas Cowboys staff
Front office: Owner – Bum Bright; President/General Manager – Tex Schramm; Executive vice president of player personnel – Gil Brandt; Research and Development – Neill Armstrong; Head coaches: Head coach – Tom Landry; Assistant head coach – Jim Myers; Offensive coaches: Offensive coordinator – Jim Myers; Quarterbacks – Jim Shofner; Running backs – Al Lavan; Wide receivers – Dick Nolan; Offensive line – Jim Myers	Defensive coaches: Defensive coordinator – Ernie Stautner; Defensive line – Ernie Stautner; Linebackers – Jerry Tubbs; Defensive backs – Gene Stallings; Special teams coaches: Special teams – Alan Lowry; Strength and conditioning: Strength and conditioning coordinator – Bob Ward

=== Roster ===
1985 Dallas Cowboys roster
Quarterbacks: 14 Gary Hogeboom; 16 Steve Pelluer; 11 Danny White; Running backs: 33 Tony Dorsett; 46 Todd Fowler; 23 James Jones; 30 Timmy Newsome; Wide receivers: 87 Gordon Banks; 86 Kenny Duckett; 80 Tony Hill; 81 Karl Powe; 82 Mike Renfro; Tight ends: 85 Fred Cornwell; 84 Doug Cosbie; 89 Brian Salonen	Offensive linemen: 61 Jim Cooper T; 65 Kurt Petersen G; 75 Phil Pozderac T; 64 Tom Rafferty C; 70 Howard Richards T; 66 Chris Schultz T; 67 Broderick Thompson G; 63 Glen Titensor G; 71 Mark Tuinei C; Defensive linemen: 99 Kevin Brooks DE; 78 John Dutton DT; 77 Jim Jeffcoat DE; 72 Ed Jones DE; 60 Don Smerek DT; 54 Randy White DT	Linebackers: 36 Vince Albritton OLB; 55 Steve DeOssie MLB/LS; 58 Mike Hegman OLB; 56 Eugene Lockhart MLB; 59 Jesse Penn OLB; 50 Jeff Rohrer OLB; Defensive backs: 40 Bill Bates SS; 47 Dextor Clinkscale SS; 26 Michael Downs FS; 27 Ron Fellows CB; 22 Victor Scott CB/S; 32 Dennis Thurman CB/S; 24 Everson Walls CB; Special teams: 4 Mike Saxon P; 1 Rafael Septién K	Reserve lists: 76 Dowe Aughtman G (IR); 62 Brian Baldinger G (IR); 83 Leon Gonzalez WR (IR); 68 Crawford Ker G (IR); 29 Robert Lavette RB (IR); 73 Kurt Ploeger DE (IR); -- Chris Waltman TE (IR); Rookies in italics 45 active, 7 inactive

== Regular season ==
=== Schedule ===
Week	Date	Opponent	Result	Record	Game Site	Attendance	Recap
1	September 9	**Washington Redskins**	**W** 44–14	1–0	Texas Stadium	62,292	Recap
2	September 15	at Detroit Lions	**L** 21–26	1–1	Pontiac Silverdome	72,985	Recap
3	September 22	Cleveland Browns	**W** 20–7	2–1	Texas Stadium	61,456	Recap
4	September 29	at Houston Oilers	**W** 17–10	3–1	Houston Astrodome	49,686	Recap
5	October 6	at **New York Giants**	**W** 30–29	4–1	Giants Stadium	74,981	Recap
6	October 13	Pittsburgh Steelers	**W** 27–13	5–1	Texas Stadium	63,062	Recap
7	October 20	at **Philadelphia Eagles**	**L** 14–16	5–2	Veterans Stadium	70,114	Recap
8	October 27	Atlanta Falcons	**W** 24–10	6–2	Texas Stadium	57,941	Recap
9	November 4	at **St. Louis Cardinals**	**L** 10–21	6–3	Busch Stadium	49,347	Recap
10	November 10	at **Washington Redskins**	**W** 13–7	7–3	RFK Stadium	55,750	Recap
11	November 17	Chicago Bears	**L** 0–44	7–4	Texas Stadium	63,855	Recap
12	November 24	**Philadelphia Eagles**	**W** 34–17	8–4	Texas Stadium	54,047	Recap
13	November 28	**St. Louis Cardinals**	**W** 35–17	9–4	Texas Stadium	54,125	Recap
14	December 8	at Cincinnati Bengals	**L** 24–50	9–5	Riverfront Stadium	56,936	Recap
15	December 15	**New York Giants**	**W** 28–21	10–5	Texas Stadium	62,310	Recap
16	December 22	at San Francisco 49ers	**L** 16–31	10–6	Candlestick Park	60,114	Recap

Division opponents are in bold text

=== Game summaries ===
==== Week 1: vs. Washington Redskins ====
Washington Redskins at Dallas Cowboys

Team	1	2	3	4	Total
Redskins	0	7	0	7	14
• **Cowboys**	3	14	13	14	44

- Date: Monday, September 9
- Location: Texas Stadium • Irving, Texas
- Game start: 8:00 p.m. CST
- Game weather: 88 °F (31 °C), wind 10 mph (16 km/h)
- Referee: Jerry Markbreit
- TV announcers (ABC): Frank Gifford O. J. Simpson Joe Namath
- Source: Pro-Football-Reference.com

Scoring summary
1	Cowboys	Rafael Septién 53 yard field goal	Cowboys 3–0
2	Cowboys	Timmy Newsome 1 yard run (Rafael Septién kick)	Cowboys 10–0
2	Redskins	John Riggins 1 yard run (Mark Moseley kick)	Cowboys 10–7
2	Cowboys	Mike Renfro 55 yard pass from Danny White (Rafael Septién kick)	Cowboys 17–7
3	Cowboys	Rafael Septién 39 yard field goal	Cowboys 20–7
3	Cowboys	Rafael Septién 43 yard field goal	Cowboys 23–7
3	Cowboys	Tony Dorsett 9 yard run (Rafael Septién kick)	Cowboys 30–7
4	Cowboys	Victor Scott 26 yard interception return (Rafael Septién kick)	Cowboys 37–7
4	Redskins	Clint Didier 19 yard pass from Joe Theismann (Mark Moseley kick)	Cowboys 37–14
4	Cowboys	Dennis Thurman 21 yard interception return (Rafael Septién kick)	Cowboys 44–14

==== Week 5 ====
Team	1	2	3	4	Total
• Cowboys	7	7	7	9	30
Giants	3	3	20	3	29

- Date: October 6
- Location: Giants Stadium, East Rutherford, New Jersey
- Game start: 9:00 p.m.
- Game weather: 59 °F (15 °C); wind 16 miles per hour (26 km/h; 14 kn)
- Referee: Chuck Heberling
- TV announcers (ABC): Frank Gifford, O. J. Simpson, Joe Namath

=== Week 6: vs. Pittsburgh Steelers ===
Pittsburgh Steelers at Dallas Cowboys

Quarter	1	2	3	4	Total
Steelers	0	3	0	10	**13**
**Cowboys**	0	10	10	7	**27**

at Texas Stadium, Irving, Texas

- Date: October 13, 1985
- Game time: 1:00 pm EDT
- Game weather: 79 °F (26.1 °C), relative humidity 68%, wind 15 miles per hour (24 km/h; 13 kn)
- Game attendance: 62,932
- Referee: Tom Dooley
- TV announcers (NBC): Charlie Jones (play by play), Merlin Olsen (color commentator)

Scoring summary

Quarter	Time	Drive			Team	Scoring information	Score	
Quarter	Time	Plays	Yards	TOP	Team	Scoring information	Steelers	Cowboys
2					Steelers	48-yard field goal by Gary Anderson	3	0
2					Cowboys	Tony Dorsett 56-yard touchdown reception from Danny White, Rafael Septién kick good	3	7
2					Cowboys	38-yard field goal by Rafael Septién	3	10
3					Cowboys	39-yard field goal by Rafael Septién	3	13
3					Cowboys	Interception returned 19 yards for touchdown by Eugene Lockhart, Rafael Septién kick good	3	20
4					Steelers	34-yard field goal by Gary Anderson	6	20
4					Steelers	Walter Abercrombie 1-yard touchdown run, Gary Anderson kick good	13	20
4					Cowboys	Tony Dorsett 35-yard touchdown run, Rafael Septién kick good	13	27
"TOP" = time of possession. For other American football terms, see Glossary of American football.							13	27

==== Week 15: vs. New York Giants ====
Team	1	2	3	4	Total
Giants	0	14	0	7	21
• Cowboys	7	14	0	7	28

- Date: December 15
- Location: Texas Stadium, Irving, Texas
- Game start: 12:00 p.m.
- Game weather: 36 °F (2 °C); Wind 11 mph (18 km/h)
- Referee: Fred Silva
- TV announcers (CBS): Verne Lundquist and Terry Bradshaw

=== Standings ===
NFC East
	W	L	T	PCT	DIV	CONF	PF	PA	STK
Dallas Cowboys^{(3)}	10	6	0	.625	6–2	7–5	357	333	L1
New York Giants^{(4)}	10	6	0	.625	5–3	8–4	399	283	W1
Washington Redskins	10	6	0	.625	4–4	6–6	297	312	W3
Philadelphia Eagles	7	9	0	.438	4–4	6–8	286	310	W1
St. Louis Cardinals	5	11	0	.313	1–7	3–9	278	414	L2

== Playoffs ==
Round	Date	Opponent	Result	Game Site	Attendance	Recap
Wild Card	First Round Bye					
Divisional	January 4, 1986	at Los Angeles Rams (2)	L 0–20	Anaheim Stadium	66,351	Recap

== Divisional playoffs ==
=== January 4, 1986 ===
==== NFC: Los Angeles Rams 20, Dallas Cowboys 0 ====
Game summary

Quarter	1	2	3	4	Total
Cowboys	0	0	0	0	0
Rams	3	0	10	7	20

at Anaheim Stadium, Anaheim, California

- Game time: 4:00 p.m. EST/1:00 p.m. PST
- Game weather: 67 °F (19 °C), fog, drizzle
- Game attendance: 66,581
- Referee: Dick Jorgensen
- TV announcers (CBS): Jack Buck, Hank Stram and Dick Vermeil

Game information
- Scoring
  - RAMS – field goal Lansford 33 RAMS 3–0
  - RAMS – Dickerson 55 run (Lansford kick) RAMS 10–0
  - RAMS – field goal Lansford 34 RAMS 13–0
  - RAMS – Dickerson 40 run (Lansford kick) RAMS 20–0

== Awards ==
- The Cowboys sent four players to the Pro Bowl following the 1985 season. Wide receiver Tony Hill went to his first since 1979, tight end Doug Cosbie was named to his third consecutive game, cornerback Everson Walls achieved his fourth, and defensive tackle Randy White was named to his ninth consecutive pro bowl. Randy White was named to the associated press All-NFL first team, while Everson Walls was named to the second team.
- Everson Walls, NFL Leader, Interceptions, (9)

== Publications ==
- The Football Encyclopedia ISBN 0-312-11435-4
- Total Football ISBN 0-06-270170-3
- Cowboys Have Always Been My Heroes ISBN 0-446-51950-2
