= 1985 St. Louis Cardinals (NFL) season =

American football team season

1985 St. Louis Cardinals season
- Owner: Bill Bidwill
- General manager: Larry Wilson
- Head coach: Jim Hanifan
- Home stadium: Busch Stadium

Results
- Record: 5–11
- Division place: 5th NFC East
- Playoffs: Did not qualify
- Pro Bowlers: LB E. J. Junior

The 1985 St. Louis Cardinals season was the franchise's 66th season in the league. The team failed to improve on their previous output of 9–7, winning only five games. This was the third straight season in which the team did not reach the playoffs. The Cardinals fired head coach Jim Hanifan the following season when the Cardinals finished in last place after a 3–1 start.

== Offseason ==
=== Draft ===
1985 St. Louis Cardinals draft
Round	Pick	Player	Position	College	Notes
1	18	Freddie Joe Nunn	Linebacker	Ole Miss	
2	51	Scott Bergold	Offensive tackle	Wisconsin	
Made roster † Pro Football Hall of Fame * Made at least one Pro Bowl during career

== Personnel ==
=== Staff ===
1985 St. Louis Cardinals staff
Front office: President – Bill Bidwill; Director of pro personnel – Larry Wilson; Director of player personnel – George Boone; Head coaches: Head coach – Jim Hanifan; Special assistant to the head coach – Leon McLaughlin; Offensive coaches: Offensive coordinator – Dick Jamieson; Offensive Backfield – Chuck Banker; Receivers – Emmitt Thomas; Tight Ends – Pete Hoener; Offensive Line – Ernie McMillan	Defensive coaches: Assistant head coach/defense – Floyd Peters; Linebackers – Rudy Feldman; Defensive Backfield – Lance Van Zandt; Special teams coaches: Special Teams – Jerry Smith

=== Roster ===
1985 St. Louis Cardinals roster
Quarterbacks (QB): 12 Scott Brunner; 15 Neil Lomax; 14 Rick McIvor; Running backs (RB): 32 Ottis Anderson; 40 Randy Love; 30 Stump Mitchell; 34 Tony Mumford; 24 Ron Wolfley; Wide receivers (WR): 86 Clyde Duncan; 87 Earnest Gray; 81 Roy Green; 85 Jay Novacek; 84 J. T. Smith; 83 Pat Tilley; Tight ends (TE): 89 Greg LaFleur; 80 Doug Marsh	Offensive linemen (OL): 74 Scott Bergold T; 71 Joe Bostic G; 64 Randy Clark C; 66 Doug Dawson G; 63 Tootie Robbins T; 56 Carlos Scott C/G; 67 Luis Sharpe T; 61 Lance Smith T/G; Defensive linemen (DL): 60 Al Baker DE; 73 Mark Duda DT; 65 David Galloway DT; 75 Curtis Greer DE; 76 Stafford Mays DE	Linebackers (LB): 52 Charles Baker OLB; 50 Bob Harris OLB; 59 Thomas Howard; 54 E. J. Junior MLB; 57 Niko Noga OLB; 53 Freddie Joe Nunn OLB; Defensive backs (DB): 35 Jeff Griffin CB; 42 Bobby Johnson FS; 47 Cedric Mack CB; 38 Lee Nelson SS; 46 Leonard Smith SS; 44 Wayne Smith CB; 48 Lionel Washington CB; 43 Lonnie Young FS; Special teams (ST): 18 Carl Birdsong P; 11 Novo Bojovic K	Reserve: 31 Earl Ferrell RB (IR); 78 Elois Grooms DT (IR); 36 Perry Harrington RB (IR); 51 Ron Monaco C (IR); 23 Benny Perrin S (IR); 72 Dan Ralph DT (IR); 33 Quentin Walker RB (IR); Rookies in italics

== Schedule ==
Week	Date	Opponent	Result	Record	Venue	Attendance
1	September 8	at Cleveland Browns	**W** 27–24	1–0	Cleveland Municipal Stadium	62,107
2	September 15	Cincinnati Bengals	**W** 41–27	2–0	Busch Memorial Stadium	46,321
3	September 22	at **New York Giants**	**L** 17–27	2–1	Giants Stadium	74,987
4	September 29	Green Bay Packers	**W** 43–28	3–1	Busch Memorial Stadium	48,598
5	October 7	at **Washington Redskins**	**L** 10–27	3–2	RFK Stadium	53,134
6	October 13	at **Philadelphia Eagles**	**L** 7–30	3–3	Veterans Stadium	48,186
7	October 20	at Pittsburgh Steelers	**L** 10–23	3–4	Three Rivers Stadium	56,478
8	October 27	Houston Oilers	**L** 10–20	3–5	Busch Memorial Stadium	43,190
9	November 4	**Dallas Cowboys**	**W** 21–10	4–5	Busch Memorial Stadium	49,347
10	November 10	at Tampa Bay Buccaneers	**L** 0–16	4–6	Tampa Stadium	34,736
11	November 17	**Philadelphia Eagles**	**L** 14–24	4–7	Busch Memorial Stadium	39,032
12	November 24	**New York Giants**	**L** 3–34	4–8	Busch Memorial Stadium	41,248
13	November 28	at **Dallas Cowboys**	**L** 17–35	4–9	Texas Stadium	54,125
14	December 8	New Orleans Saints	**W** 28–16	5–9	Busch Memorial Stadium	29,527
15	December 15	at Los Angeles Rams	**L** 14–46	5–10	Anaheim Stadium	52,052
16	December 21	**Washington Redskins**	**L** 16–27	5–11	Busch Memorial Stadium	28,090
Note: Intra-division opponents are in **bold** text.

=== Standings ===
NFC East
	W	L	T	PCT	DIV	CONF	PF	PA	STK
Dallas Cowboys^{(3)}	10	6	0	.625	6–2	7–5	357	333	L1
New York Giants^{(4)}	10	6	0	.625	5–3	8–4	399	283	W1
Washington Redskins	10	6	0	.625	4–4	6–6	297	312	W3
Philadelphia Eagles	7	9	0	.438	4–4	6–8	286	310	W1
St. Louis Cardinals	5	11	0	.313	1–7	3–9	278	414	L2
