= Leon Gonzalez =

American football player (born 1963)

No. 83, 89
- Position: Wide receiver

Personal information
- Born: September 21, 1963 (age 63); Jacksonville, Florida, U.S.
- Listed height: 5 ft 10 in (1.78 m)
- Listed weight: 162 lb (73 kg)

Career information
- High school: Jean Ribault (Jacksonville)
- College: Bethune-Cookman
- NFL draft: 1985: 8th round, 216th overall pick

Career history
- Dallas Cowboys (1985); Tampa Bay Buccaneers (1987)*; Atlanta Falcons (1987)
- * Offseason or practice squad member only

Awards and highlights
- 2× All-MEAC (1983, 1984)

Career NFL statistics
- Receptions: 6
- Receiving yards: 68
- Stats at Pro Football Reference

Leon Eugene Gonzalez III (born September 21, 1963) is an American former professional football player who was a wide receiver in the National Football League (NFL) for the Dallas Cowboys and Atlanta Falcons. He played college football for the Bethune–Cookman Wildcats.

== Early life ==
Gonzalez attended Jean Ribault High School, where he practiced football, basketball and track. He was a teammate of future NFL wide receiver Kelvin Martin.

He accepted a football scholarship from Bethune-Cookman University. As a freshman, his teammates gave him the nickname "Speedy" Gonzalez. As a junior, he became a starter, registering 43 receptions for 718 yards and 6 touchdowns.

As a senior, he led the MEAC in receiving with 56 receptions for 941 yards and 9 touchdowns. He also contributed to the team winning the Mideastern Athletic Conference Division championship.

== Professional career ==
=== Dallas Cowboys ===
Gonzalez was selected by the Dallas Cowboys in the eighth round (216th overall) of the 1985 NFL draft. He was also selected by the Orlando Renegades in the eleventh round (147th overall) of the 1985 USFL draft. As a rookie, he was a backup wide receiver behind Mike Renfro and also returned punts. He finished with 3 receptions for 28 yards and 15 punt returns for 58 yards (3.9-yard avg.). He was waived on December 5 to be placed on the injured reserve list with a Bunion condition, and to make room for Gordon Banks. He was released on August 23, 1986.

=== Tampa Bay Buccaneers ===
In May 1987, he signed as a free agent with the Tampa Bay Buccaneers. He was released before the start of the season.

=== Atlanta Falcons ===
After the NFLPA strike was declared on the third week of the 1987 season, those contests were canceled (reducing the 16 game season to 15) and the NFL decided that the games would be played with replacement players. Gonzalez was signed in September to be a part of the Atlanta Falcons replacement team. He was a backup at wide receiver. He appeared in 2 games, posting 3 receptions for 40 yards. He was cut on October 19, at the end of the strike.
