= Kurt Ploeger =

American football player (born 1962)

No. 73, 71, 68, 63
- Positions: Defensive end, defensive tackle

Personal information
- Born: December 1, 1962 (age 63); Iowa Falls, Iowa, U.S.
- Listed height: 6 ft 5 in (1.96 m)
- Listed weight: 265 lb (120 kg)

Career information
- High school: Le Sueur (MN)
- College: Gustavus Adolphus
- NFL draft: 1985: 4th round, 144th overall pick

Career history
- Dallas Cowboys (1985–1986); Green Bay Packers (1986); Buffalo Bills (1986); Minnesota Vikings (1987)

Awards and highlights
- Division III All-American (1984); Little All-American (1984); NAIA Division II All-American (1983); 2× All-MIAC (1983, 1984); All-District 13 (1983)

Career NFL statistics
- Games played: 5
- Stats at Pro Football Reference

Kurt Ploeger (born December 1, 1962) is an American former professional football player who was a defensive end in the National Football League (NFL) for the Dallas Cowboys, Green Bay Packers, Buffalo Bills and Minnesota Vikings. He played college football at Gustavus Adolphus College.

== Early life ==
Ploeger attended LeSueur High School, where he practiced football, basketball, and track. He attended Gustavus Adolphus College, where he played football and ran hurdles his freshman year, before deciding to focus on football.

He was named the starter at right defensive tackle as a junior and became a dominant player, finishing with 96 tackles, 7 quarterback sacks, 6 blocked passes, one fumble recovery and a blocked punt. He received NAIA Division II College Football 1st Team All-American, All-MIAC and All-District 13 honors.

Ploeger improved his production as a senior, leading the team with 113 tackles (45 solos and 11 for loss), 8 quarterback sacks, 4 blocked passes, and one fumble recovery. He earned Division II 1st Team All-America honors Pizza Hut 1st Team All-American and All-MIAC honors.

In 2002, he was inducted into the Gustavus Adolphus College Athletics Hall of Fame.

== Professional career ==
=== Dallas Cowboys ===
Ploeger was selected by the Dallas Cowboys in the sixth round (144th overall) of the 1985 NFL draft. He was placed on the injured reserve list with a thigh injury in August 1985. On September 1, 1986, he was waived, but was later re-signed on September 9 and played in 3 games, before being released again to make room for Mike Renfro, who was activated from the injured reserve list.

=== Green Bay Packers ===
He was signed as a free agent by the Green Bay Packers on October 13, 1986. He was cut on October 21.

=== Buffalo Bills ===
On December 17, 1986, he signed with the Buffalo Bills. He was waived on August 31, 1987.

=== Minnesota Vikings ===
After the players went on a strike on the third week of the 1987 season, those games were canceled (reducing the 16-game season to 15) and the NFL decided that the games would be played with replacement players. Ploeger was signed to be a part of the Minnesota Vikings replacement team. He played in one game, but suffered a career ending back injury.

== Personal life ==
After serving as a church planter in Minnesota for 17 years, He now serves on the staff of the Evangelical Free Church of America in Mesa, Arizona. He holds an M.Div. from Bethel Theological Seminary in St. Paul, MN and a B.A. from Gustavus Adolphus College. He has been married to his wife Stacy since 1986. They have 2 adult children, Kelsey and Brett (B.J.).
