= 1985 Washington Redskins season =

NFL team season

- Owner: Jack Kent Cooke
- General manager: Bobby Beathard
- President: John Kent Cooke
- Head coach: Joe Gibbs
- Offensive coordinator: Joe Bugel
- Defensive coordinator: Richie Petitbon
- Home stadium: RFK Stadium

Results
- Record: 10–6
- Division place: 3rd NFC East
- Playoffs: Did not qualify

The 1985 Washington Redskins season was the franchise's 54th season in the National Football League (NFL) and their 49th in Washington, D.C. The team failed to improve on their 11–5 record from 1984 and finished 10–6. The biggest moment of the year occurred on a November 18 Monday Night Football game, which witnessed Joe Theismann's career-ending injury after a sack by New York Giants outside linebacker Lawrence Taylor. The tackle resulted in a serious leg injury, and Theismann never played in the NFL again. Though the team failed to make the playoffs, they remained in contention for the entire regular season.

They also were assessed the fewest penalties in the league, with 74. That was 48 fewer than the Bills, who won eight fewer games than Washington did.

During the December 15 game against the Cincinnati Bengals, law authorities conducted a successful sting operation which resulted in the arrest of 101 fugitives who thought they had received free tickets to the game.

== Offseason ==
=== NFL draft ===
1985 Washington Redskins draft
Round	Selection	Player	Position	College
2	33	Tory Nixon	DB	San Diego State
5	122	Raphel Cherry	DB	Hawaii
6	163	Danzell Lee	TE	Lamar
8	219	Barry Wilburn	DB	Mississippi
10	263	Terry Orr	TE	Texas
11	290	Raleigh McKenzie	C	Tennessee

== Personnel ==
=== Coaches / Staff ===
1985 Washington Redskins staff
Front office: Owner / Chairman Of The Board – Jack Kent Cooke; General Manager – Bobby Beathard; Senior Vice President - Gerard T. Gabrys; Director of Player Personnel - Mike Allman; Head coaches: Head Coach – Joe Gibbs; Assistant Head Coach – Richie Petitbon; Offensive coaches: Offensive Coordinator – Joe Bugel; Quarterbacks – Jerry Rhome; Running Backs – Don Breaux; Wide Receivers – Charley Taylor; Tight Ends – Rennie Simmons; Offensive Line – Joe Bugel	Defensive coaches: Defensive Coordinator – Larry Peccatiello; Defensive Coordinator – Richie Petitbon; Defensive Line – LaVern Torgeson; Special teams coaches: Special Teams – Wayne Sevier; Strength and conditioning: Strength and Conditioning Coach / Coordinator – Dan Riley; Assistant Strength Coach - John Dunn

=== Roster ===
1985 Washington Redskins roster
Quarterbacks (QB): 17 Steve Bartkowski; 16 Babe Laufenberg; 10 Jay Schroeder; Running backs (RB): 30 Reggie Branch; 35 Keith Griffin; 44 John Riggins; 38 George Rogers; 39 Otis Wonsley; Wide receivers (WR): 84 Gary Clark; 83 Mark McGrath; 81 Art Monk; 80 Joker Phillips; Tight ends (TE): 86 Clint Didier; 82 Anthony Jones; 88 Rick Walker; 85 Don Warren	Offensive linemen (OL): 53 Jeff Bostic C/G; 68 Russ Grimm G; 61 Ken Huff G; 66 Joe Jacoby T; 73 Mark May T; 63 Raleigh McKenzie C/G; 60 Dan McQuaid T; Defensive linemen (DL): 67 Tom Beasley DE/DT; 65 Dave Butz DT; 78 Dean Hamel DT; 64 Steve Hamilton DE; 72 Dexter Manley DE; 71 Charles Mann DE	Linebackers (LB): 58 Stuart Anderson MLB; 51 Monte Coleman OLB; 55 Mel Kaufman; 57 Rich Milot; 52 Neal Olkewicz MLB; Defensive backs (DB): 37 Raphel Cherry SS; 32 Vernon Dean CB; 28 Darrell Green CB; 25 Curtis Jordan FS; 23 Tony Peters SS; 45 Barry Wilburn CB; 47 Greg Williams FS; 34 Kevin Williams CB; Special teams (ST): 12 Steve Cox P; 3 Mark Moseley K	Reserve: 48 Ken Coffey S (IR); -- Darnell Dailey LB (IR); 76 Rick Donnalley C (IR); 77 Darryl Grant DT (IR); 5 Jeff Hayes P (IR); 31 Ken Jenkins RB (IR); -- Bruce Kimball G (IR); 94 Danzell Lee TE (IR); -- Mike McClearn T (IR); 89 Calvin Muhammad WR (IR); -- Mike Newton RB (IR); 87 Terry Orr TE (IR); 56 Chris Osswald C/G (IR); -- Willie Rosborough DT (IR); 75 Bob Slater DT (PUP); 7 Joe Theismann QB (IR); 69 R. C. Thielemann G (IR); 20 Lionel Vital RB (IR); Rookies in italics

== Regular season ==
=== Schedule ===
Week	Date	Opponent	Result	Record	Venue	Attendance	Recap
1	September 9	at **Dallas Cowboys**	**L** 14–44	0–1	Texas Stadium	62,292	Recap
2	September 15	Houston Oilers	**W** 16–13	1–1	RFK Stadium	53,553	Recap
3	September 22	**Philadelphia Eagles**	**L** 6–19	1–2	RFK Stadium	53,748	Recap
4	September 29	at Chicago Bears	**L** 10–45	1–3	Soldier Field	63,708	Recap
5	October 7	**St. Louis Cardinals**	**W** 27–10	2–3	RFK Stadium	53,134	Recap
6	October 13	Detroit Lions	**W** 24–3	3–3	RFK Stadium	52,845	Recap
7	October 20	at **New York Giants**	**L** 3–17	3–4	Giants Stadium	74,389	Recap
8	October 27	at Cleveland Browns	**W** 14–7	4–4	Cleveland Municipal Stadium	78,540	Recap
9	November 3	at Atlanta Falcons	**W** 44–10	5–4	Atlanta–Fulton County Stadium	42,209	Recap
10	November 10	**Dallas Cowboys**	**L** 7–13	5–5	RFK Stadium	55,750	Recap
11	November 18	**New York Giants**	**W** 23–21	6–5	RFK Stadium	53,371	Recap
12	November 24	at Pittsburgh Steelers	**W** 30–23	7–5	Three Rivers Stadium	59,293	Recap
13	December 1	San Francisco 49ers	**L** 8–35	7–6	RFK Stadium	51,321	Recap
14	December 8	at **Philadelphia Eagles**	**W** 17–12	8–6	Veterans Stadium	60,737	Recap
15	December 15	Cincinnati Bengals	**W** 27–24	9–6	RFK Stadium	50,544	Recap
16	December 21	at **St. Louis Cardinals**	**W** 27–16	10–6	Busch Memorial Stadium	28,090	Recap

Note: Intra-division opponents are in bold text.

=== Game summaries ===
==== Week 1: at Dallas Cowboys ====
Washington Redskins at Dallas Cowboys

Team	1	2	3	4	Total
Redskins	0	7	0	7	14
• **Cowboys**	3	14	13	14	44

- Date: Monday, September 9
- Location: Texas Stadium • Irving, Texas
- Game start: 8:00 p.m. CST
- Game weather: 88 °F (31 °C), wind 10 mph (16 km/h)
- Referee: Jerry Markbreit
- TV announcers (ABC): Frank Gifford O. J. Simpson Joe Namath
- Source: Pro-Football-Reference.com

Scoring summary
1	Cowboys	Rafael Septién 53-yard field goal	Cowboys 3–0
2	Cowboys	Timmy Newsome 1-yard run (Rafael Septien kick)	Cowboys 10–0
2	Redskins	John Riggins 1-yard run (Mark Moseley kick)	Cowboys 10–7
2	Cowboys	Mike Renfro 55-yard pass from Danny White (Rafael Septien kick)	Cowboys 17–7
3	Cowboys	Rafael Septien 39-yard field goal	Cowboys 20–7
3	Cowboys	Rafael Septien 43-yard field goal	Cowboys 23–7
3	Cowboys	Tony Dorsett 9-yard run (Rafael Septien kick)	Cowboys 30–7
4	Cowboys	Victor Scott 26-yard interception return (Rafael Septien kick)	Cowboys 37–7
4	Redskins	Clint Didier 19-yard pass from Joe Theismann (Mark Moseley kick)	Cowboys 37–14
4	Cowboys	Dennis Thurman 21-yard interception return (Rafael Septien kick)	Cowboys 44–14

==== Week 2: vs. Houston Oilers ====
Houston Oilers at Washington Redskins

Team	1	2	3	4	Total
Oilers	0	10	3	0	13
• **Redskins**	13	3	0	0	16

- Date: Sunday, September 15
- Location: RFK Stadium • Washington, D.C.
- Game start: 1:00 p.m. EST
- Game weather: 62 °F (17 °C), wind 8 mph (13 km/h)
- Referee: Gordon McCarter
- Source: Pro-Football-Reference.com

Scoring summary
1	Redskins	Calvin Muhammad 17-yard pass from Joe Theismann (Mark Moseley kick)	Redskins 7–0
1	Redskins	George Rogers 31-yard run (kick failed)	Redskins 13–0
2	Redskins	Mark Moseley 34-yard field goal	Redskins 16–0
2	Oilers	Tony Zendejas 44-yard field goal	Redskins 16–3
2	Oilers	Drew Hill 2-yard pass from Warren Moon (Tony Zendejas kick)	Redskins 16–10
3	Oilers	Tony Zendejas 35-yard field goal	Redskins 16–13

==== Week 7 ====
Team	1	2	3	4	Total
Redskins	0	0	0	3	3
• Giants	0	7	7	3	17

- Date: October 20
- Location: Giants Stadium, East Rutherford, New Jersey
- Game start: 1:00 p.m.
- Game weather: 60 °F (15.6 °C); wind 14 miles per hour (23 km/h; 12 kn)
- Referee: Gene Barth

==== Week 11 ====
Team	1	2	3	4	Total
Giants	7	0	14	0	21
• Redskins	7	0	7	9	23

- Date: November 18
- Location: RFK Stadium, Washington, D.C.
- Game start: 9:00 p.m. EST
- Game weather: 52 °F (11.1 °C); wind 6 miles per hour (9.7 km/h; 5.2 kn)
- Referee: Fred Wyant
- Television network: ABC

=== Standings ===
NFC East
	W	L	T	PCT	DIV	CONF	PF	PA	STK
^{(3)} Dallas Cowboys	10	6	0	.625	6–2	7–5	357	333	L1
^{(4)} New York Giants	10	6	0	.625	5–3	8–4	399	283	W1
Washington Redskins	10	6	0	.625	4–4	6–6	297	312	W3
Philadelphia Eagles	7	9	0	.438	4–4	6–8	286	310	W1
St. Louis Cardinals	5	11	0	.313	1–7	3–9	278	414	L2

== See also ==
- Operation Flagship
