= 1985 Philadelphia Eagles season =

NFL team season

- Owner: Norman Braman & Ed Leibowitz
- General manager: Harry Gamble
- Head coach: Marion Campbell (fired December 16, 6-9 record); Fred Bruney (interim, 1-0 record)
- Home stadium: Veterans Stadium

Results
- Record: 7–9
- Division place: 4th NFC East
- Playoffs: Did not qualify
- Pro Bowlers: FS Wes Hopkins; WR Mike Quick

Uniform
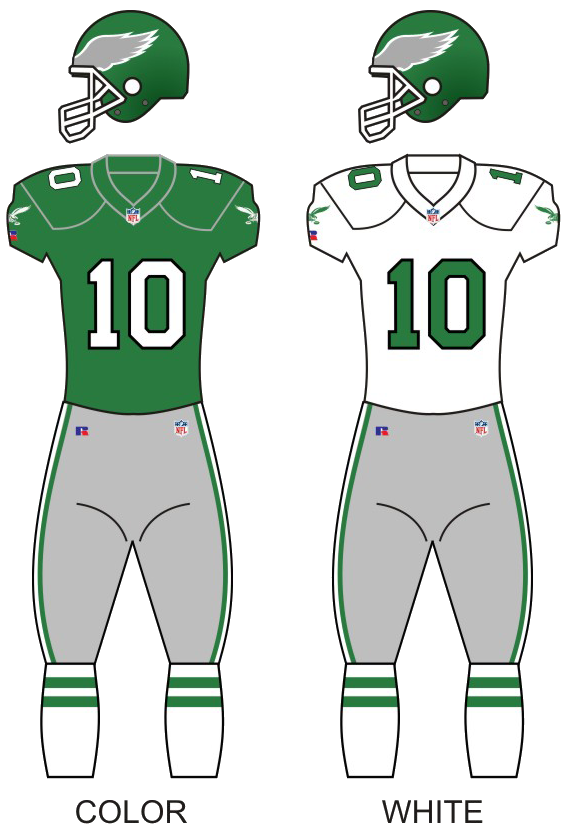

The 1985 Philadelphia Eagles season was their 53rd in the National Football League (NFL). The team improved upon their previous output of 6–9–1, winning seven games. This was the fourth consecutive season in which the team failed to qualify for the playoffs.

Philadelphia was in position to earn a wild-card berth with a 6–5 record by late November, but a four-game losing streak, which included a home loss to the Minnesota Vikings in which the Eagles squandered a 23–0 fourth-quarter lead, foiled their playoff hopes. That losing streak also cost head coach Marion Campbell his job before the season finale at Minnesota. Under interim coach Fred Bruney, the Eagles pulled off a 37–35 victory at the Metrodome to finish the season on an up note.

Two bright spots emerged at the quarterback position as Ron Jaworski returned from the broken leg suffered at the end of the 1984 season, and performed well enough (3,450 passing yards, 17 touchdowns) to be considered for comeback player of the year, though no award was given out. In addition, second-round draft pick Randall Cunningham earned his first career victory at RFK Stadium on September 22 at Washington. On November 10, at Veterans Stadium, Jaworski combined with wide receiver Mike Quick for a club-record 99-yard touchdown pass in overtime to beat the Atlanta Falcons, 23–17.

== Offseason ==
=== NFL draft ===
Round	Pick	Player	Position	School
1	9	Kevin Allen	OT	Indiana
2	37	Randall Cunningham	QB	UNLV
4	93	Greg Naron	G	North Carolina
5	121	Dwayne Jiles	LB	Texas Tech
6	156	Ken Reeves	T	Texas A&M
8	205	Tom Polley	LB	UNLV
9	231	Dave Toub	C	Texas El-Paso
9	233	Joe Drake	NT	Arizona
10	261	Mark Kelso	DB	William & Mary
11	289	Herman Hunter	RB	Tennessee St.
12	317	Todd Russell	DB	Boston College

== Personnel ==
=== Staff ===
1985 Philadelphia Eagles staff
Front office: Owner – Norman Braman; Vice President and General Manager – Harry Gamble; Director of Player Personnel – Lynn Stiles; Head coaches: Head Coach – Marion Campbell; Assistant Head Coach – Fred Bruney; Offensive coaches: Offensive Coordinator – Ted Marchibroda; Running Backs – Milt Jackson; Receivers – Tom Coughlin; Tight Ends – Frank Gansz; Offensive Line – Ken Iman	Defensive coaches: Defensive Coordinator – Marion Campbell; Defensive Line – Tommy Brasher; Linebackers – Chuck Clausen; Defensive Backs – Fred Bruney; Special teams coaches: Special Teams – Frank Gansz

=== Roster ===
1985 Philadelphia Eagles roster
Quarterbacks (QB): 12 Randall Cunningham; 7 Ron Jaworski; Running backs (RB): 39 Major Everett; 26 Michael Haddix; 36 Herman Hunter; 41 Earnest Jackson; 38 Jairo Penaranda; Wide receivers (WR): 80 Keith Baker; 86 Gregg Garrity; 81 Kenny Jackson; 82 Mike Quick; Tight ends (TE): 87 John Goode; 89 David Little; 88 John Spagnola	Offensive linemen (OL): 72 Kevin Allen T; 63 Ron Baker G; 65 Mark Dennard C; 67 Gerry Feehery C; 77 Tom Jelesky T; 73 Steve Kenney G; 74 Leonard Mitchell T; 66 Ken Reeves T; Defensive linemen (DL): 98 Greg Brown DE; 71 Ken Clarke NT; 94 Byron Darby DE; 99 Joe Drake NT; 93 Thomas Strauthers DE; 91 Reggie White DE	Linebackers (LB): 50 Garry Cobb OLB; 58 Anthony Griggs ILB; 53 Dwayne Jiles OLB; 52 Rich Kraynak ILB; 55 Mike Reichenbach ILB; 51 Reggie Wilkes OLB; 59 Joel Williams OLB; Defensive backs (DB): 21 Evan Cooper CB; 46 Herm Edwards CB; 24 Ray Ellis SS; 29 Elbert Foules CB; 48 Wes Hopkins FS; 20 Andre Waters SS; 22 Brenard Wilson FS; 43 Roynell Young CB; Special teams (ST): 2 Mike Horan P; 8 Paul McFadden K	Reserve: 85 Ron Johnson WR (IR); 54 Jon Kimmel LB (IR); 69 Dwaine Morris DE (IR); -- Greg Naron G (IR); 57 Tom Polley LB (IR); 95 Jody Schulz LB (IR); Rookies in italics

== Schedule ==
Week	Date	Opponent	Result	Record	Venue	Attendance
1	September 8	at **New York Giants**	**L** 0–21	0–1	Giants Stadium	76,141
2	September 15	Los Angeles Rams	**L** 6–17	0–2	Veterans Stadium	60,920
3	September 22	at **Washington Redskins**	**W** 19–6	1–2	RFK Stadium	53,748
4	September 29	**New York Giants**	**L** 10–16 (OT)	1–3	Veterans Stadium	66,696
5	October 6	at New Orleans Saints	**L** 21–23	1–4	Louisiana Superdome	56,364
6	October 13	**St. Louis Cardinals**	**W** 30–7	2–4	Veterans Stadium	48,186
7	October 20	**Dallas Cowboys**	**W** 16–14	3–4	Veterans Stadium	70,114
8	October 27	Buffalo Bills	**W** 21–17	4–4	Veterans Stadium	60,987
9	November 3	at San Francisco 49ers	**L** 13–24	4–5	Candlestick Park	58,383
10	November 10	Atlanta Falcons	**W** 23–17 (OT)	5–5	Veterans Stadium	63,694
11	November 17	at **St. Louis Cardinals**	**W** 24–14	6–5	Busch Memorial Stadium	39,032
12	November 24	at **Dallas Cowboys**	**L** 17–34	6–6	Texas Stadium	54,047
13	December 1	Minnesota Vikings	**L** 23–28	6–7	Veterans Stadium	54,688
14	December 8	**Washington Redskins**	**L** 12–17	6–8	Veterans Stadium	60,737
15	December 15	at San Diego Chargers	**L** 14–20	6–9	Jack Murphy Stadium	45,569
16	December 22	at Minnesota Vikings	**W** 37–35	7–9	Hubert H. Humphrey Metrodome	49,722

Note: Intra-division opponents are in bold text.

=== Game summaries ===
==== Week 8 ====
Team	1	2	3	4	Total
Bills	7	3	7	0	17
• Eagles	0	0	0	21	21

- Date: October 27
- Location: Veterans Stadium
- Game start: 1:00 p.m. EST
- Game attendance: 60.987
- Game weather: 66 °F (18.9 °C); wind 17 miles per hour (27 km/h; 15 kn)
- Referee: Ben Dreith
- TV announcers (NBC): Tom Hammond and Dave Rowe

Scoring summary
Q1	BUF	Reed 14 yard run (Norwood kick)	BUF 7–0
Q2	BUF	Norwood 26 yard field goal	BUF 10–0
Q3	BUF	Reed 7 yard pass from Ferragamo (Norwood kick)	BUF 17-0
Q4	PHI	Jaworski 3 yard run (McFadden kick)	BUF 17–7
Q4	PHI	Hopkins 24 yard interception return (McFadden kick)	BUF 17–14
Q4	PHI	Quick 32 yard pass from Jaworski (McFadden kick)	PHI 21–17

==== Week 10 ====
Team	1	2	3	4	OT	Total
Falcons	0	0	0	17	0	17
• Eagles	0	14	3	0	6	23

- Date: November 10
- Location: Veterans Stadium, Philadelphia
- Game start: 1:00 p.m.
- Game weather: 61 °F (16 °C), wind 16 mph (26 km/h)
- Referee: Chuck Heberling

Scoring summary
2	PHI	Earnest Jackson 8 yard run (Paul McFadden kick)	Eagles 7–0
2	PHI	Ron Jaworski 1 yard run (Paul McFadden kick)	Eagles 14–0
3	PHI	Paul McFadden 30 yard field goal	Eagles 17–0
4	ATL	Joe Washington 18 yard pass from David Archer (Mick Luckhurst kick)	Eagles 17–7
4	ATL	Gerald Riggs 1 yard run (Mick Luckhurst kick)	Eagles 17–14
4	ATL	Mick Luckhurst 27 yard field goal	Tie 17–17
OT	PHI	Mike Quick 99 yard pass from Ron Jaworski	Eagles 23–17

=== Standings ===
NFC East
	W	L	T	PCT	DIV	CONF	PF	PA	STK
Dallas Cowboys^{(3)}	10	6	0	.625	6–2	7–5	357	333	L1
New York Giants^{(4)}	10	6	0	.625	5–3	8–4	399	283	W1
Washington Redskins	10	6	0	.625	4–4	6–6	297	312	W3
Philadelphia Eagles	7	9	0	.438	4–4	6–8	286	310	W1
St. Louis Cardinals	5	11	0	.313	1–7	3–9	278	414	L2

== Awards and honors ==
- Mike Quick, 1985 Pro Bowl selection
- Mike Quick, Associated Press first-team All-Pro selection 1985
