= Operation Flagship =

1985 American police sting operation

- Part of Fugitive Investigative Strike Team (FIST)
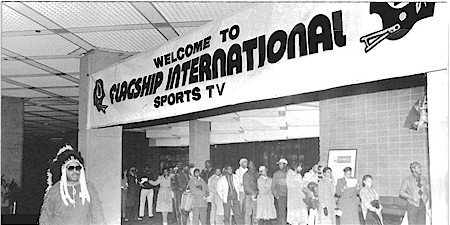
- Banner welcoming the fugitives to the convention center. The man wearing a war bonnet is a disguised deputy marshal.
- Operation name: Operation Flagship
- Part of: Fugitive Investigative Strike Team (FIST)
- Type: Sting operation
- Scope: Domestic

Participants
- Planned by: U.S. Marshals Service
- Executed by: U.S. Marshals Service, Metropolitan Police Department

Mission
- Target: Fugitives
- Objective: To lure and arrest wanted people with outstanding arrest warrants in the D.C. area to an NFL game at RFK Stadium
- Method: Honeypot – wanted fugitives were sent invitations with free tickets to a game at RFK Stadium between the Cincinnati Bengals and the Washington Redskins

Timeline
- Date executed: December 15, 1985

Results
- Arrests: 101

Operation Flagship was a sting operation jointly organized by the United States Marshals Service and the Metropolitan Police Department in Washington, D.C. that resulted in the arrest of 101 wanted fugitives on December 15, 1985.

The fugitives voluntarily went to the Washington Convention Center, responding to an invitation sent by the fictitious television company Flagship International Sports Television, (which had the same initials, F.I.S.T., as Fugitive Investigative Strike Team) to claim two free tickets to watch the Washington Redskins American football home game against the Cincinnati Bengals and for a chance to win tickets to Super Bowl XX. A total of 166 marshals and police officers were involved in the operation, with undercover personnel posing as tuxedo-wearing ushers, cheerleaders, emcees, caterers, mascots, and maintenance staff.

The operation has been hailed as one of the largest and most successful mass arrests of fugitives by U.S. law enforcement.

== Background ==
From 1981 to 1986, the U.S. Marshals Service conducted a series of nine operations called Fugitive Investigative Strike Team (FIST) operations, with the aim of capturing thousands of wanted fugitives in the United States.

One tactic the U.S. Marshals used to lure fugitives were "get-something-for-nothing" schemes which were often quite successful. This was demonstrated in 1984 when U.S. Marshals conducted FIST VII, a large-scale operation spanning over two months and eight states that resulted in the arrest of 3,309 fugitives. In New York City, fugitives were sent a notice from the fictitious Brooklyn Bridge Delivery Service to pick up their "valuable" packages. In Buffalo, fugitives were notified that they had won between $250 and $10,000 in a lottery. In Hartford, Connecticut, younger fugitives were notified that they had won two free tickets to a Boy George concert, including dinner for two and the use of a limousine. In all cases, the fugitives were arrested when they tried to claim their packages or prizes at specified locations. For the marshals, arresting fugitives while away from home was significantly safer as they are often caught unarmed and off-guard.

At least half of the 3,309 fugitives arrested in FIST VII were later released on bail.

== Preparations ==
For Operation Flagship, while having dinner, Chief Deputy U.S. Marshal Tobias P. Roche (District of Columbia) and U.S. Marshal Herbert M. Rutherford III (District of Columbia) noted the uproar of support for the Washington Redskins, particularly the difficulty in acquiring tickets for their sold-out home games and the fact that the waiting list for season tickets lasted several years. They particularly focused on the much-anticipated December 15 game between the Redskins and the Bengals, the winner of which would determine who would go to the playoffs.

In November 1985, Roche with the approval of Rutherford, instructed deputy U.S. Marshals and fugitive task force members of the Washington D.C. Metropolitan Police Department to mail invitations to the last known addresses of approximately 3,000 wanted persons. The invitations were sent by the fictitious firm Flagship International Sports Television, which shares the same acronym with Fugitive Investigative Strike Team. The recipients were told that as part of the firm's promotional offer, they had won two complimentary tickets to the Redskins-Bengals game and that they were invited to a pre-game brunch at the Washington Convention Center on the morning of December 15, 1985. The recipients were also told they could enter a raffle draw to win 10 season tickets for the Washington Redskins and the grand prize of a week-long, all expenses paid trip to New Orleans to watch Super Bowl XX.

The fugitives were wanted for various felonies including assault, robbery, burglary, escape, narcotics violations, rape, arson, fraud, or a combination thereof. Of the 3,000 people who were sent invitations, 167 replied positively to the invitation.

Various clues were left by Roche, who authored the ruse. For example, the invitation letters sent by the marshals were signed by "I. Michael Detnaw" ("wanted" spelled backwards) and when the fugitives called the specified telephone number to confirm their attendance, an operator would redirect them to Flagship's business manager "Markus Cran" ("narc" spelled backwards) while the song "I Fought the Law" played in the background.

Still, the ruse was convincing enough that on the morning of December 15, a lawyer representing the actual local broadcaster for the Redskins game went to the police command post to issue a cease and desist order, complaining that Flagship International did not have the appropriate license to operate in the district.

The marshals and officers spent six weeks training for the operation, including three dress rehearsals so that assigned undercover officers could acclimate to their roles. Deputy marshals were brought in from outside Washington D.C. as the planners feared that some of the fugitives might recognize the local marshals who had guarded them in courtrooms or taken them to jail.

== Operation ==
The marshals and the police officers arrived at the convention center at 5:30 a.m. on December 15 to set up the operation. To minimize risk, the planners set up two separate areas in the convention center: one area to greet the "guests" and another area where they could separate the fugitives in smaller batches to make the arrests. Although the invitations indicated guests should arrive at 9:00 a.m., many of the excited guests arrived as early as 8:00 a.m.

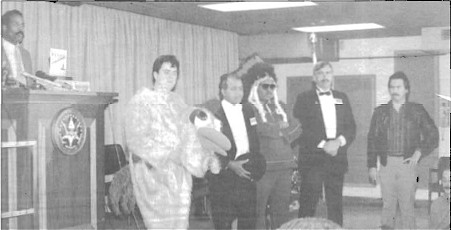
U.S. Marshals wearing the tuxedos and sports mascots they used as disguises during a press conference

To make the scene more believable, undercover officers carried balloons, sang Redskins cheers, served buffet brunch, and played videos from the Redskins' first Super Bowl win on the convention center screens. Officers dressed as maintenance workers and ushers; one marshal wore a Redskins war bonnet while another wore a knock-off San Diego Chicken suit to parade around the convention center while also monitoring if the fugitives were becoming suspicious. Every officer involved carried a concealed firearm.

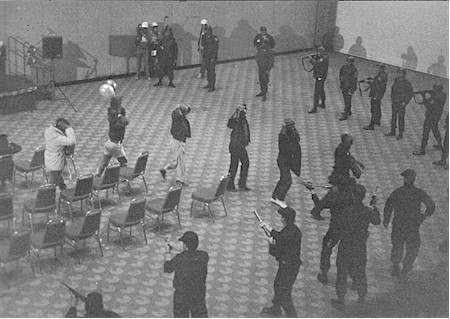
The Special Operations Group arresting one batch of fugitives

Upon the fugitives' arrival, deputy marshals posing as Flagship International employees checked their IDs, verified their identities through phone calls with backroom staff, and gave them color-coded name tags. Code words such as "double winner" were used to identify fugitives considered especially dangerous. Female officers disguised as cheerleaders were used to discreetly frisk the fugitives for concealed weapons by offering hugs and putting their arms around their waists.

Louie McKinney, chief of enforcement operations for the U.S. Marshals, posed as the top hat–wearing master of ceremonies for the program exclusive for the "winners". Each group of fugitives, approximately 10–20 per batch, were told to sit down in an auditorium to listen to a few remarks from McKinney before receiving their prizes. Upon mentioning the signal word "surprise", 25 members of the Special Operations Group commanded by Deputy U.S. Marshal William F. Degan, Jr. wearing tactical gear would storm the auditorium and quickly surround the fugitives. They were then handcuffed and escorted outside to awaiting buses. A total of 101 fugitives were arrested by the end of the operation.

== Aftermath and legacy ==
Reporters from CBS and the Los Angeles Times were specifically invited by the marshals to document and publicize the operation. Stanley Morris, the director of the U.S. Marshals Service at the time, credited the media coverage for boosting the organization's profile with the general public.

Two days after the operation, an editorial by The Washington Post enumerated the criminal records of the arrested fugitives: "15 warrants for assault, five for robbery, six for burglary, four for escape, 19 for bond default or bail violation, 18 for narcotics violations, 59 for probation or parole violation and 41 for a variety of charges from rape to arson to forgery." The total cost for Operation Flagship amounted to $22,100, or approximately $218.81 per arrest (equivalent to $655.01 in 2025). In comparison, the U.S. Marshals Service typically spent an average of $1,295 per arrest in 1985 (equivalent to $3,877 in 2025).

Two of the marshals involved in the operation, Louie McKinney (the "master of ceremonies") and Stacia Hylton (one of the "cheerleaders"), went on to become directors of the U.S. Marshals Service.

In 2016, NFL Films produced a short documentary featuring interviews with McKinney, Hylton, Roche, and Rutherford. In 2017, ESPN produced a 30 for 30 documentary short about the operation called "Strike Team".

Writing in 2019, authors Jerry Clark and Ed Palattella described Operation Flagship as "one of the most legendary and effective in the history of the U.S. Marshals Service." They attributed its "double success" to the sheer number of fugitives caught in a single operation while also avoiding the dangers typically associated with capturing them at home or on the streets.

Operation Flagship inspired a scene in the 1989 film Sea of Love, starring Al Pacino. In the film, the New York City Police Department stages a similar sting operation, luring 45 wanted criminals with outstanding warrants to a ballroom, where they were told they could have breakfast with members of the New York Yankees. Once inside, Detective Frank Keller, played by Pacino, informs the criminals that they are under arrest, as police officers wearing Yankees shirts flood into the ballroom.

M. Night Shyamalan drew inspiration from Operation Flagship for his 2024 film Trap.

In a season 9 episode of The Simpsons, a similar sting captures Homer for unpaid parking fines.
