= Larry Kinnebrew =

American football player (born 1960)

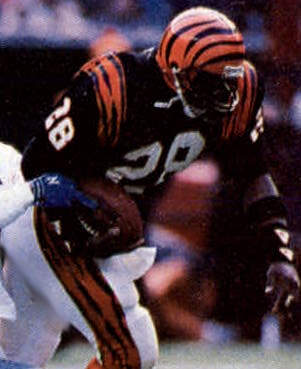
- Kinnebrew with the Cincinnati Bengals in 1985

No. 28
- Position: Running back

Personal information
- Born: June 11, 1960 (age 66); Rome, Georgia, U.S.
- Listed height: 6 ft 1 in (1.85 m)
- Listed weight: 255 lb (116 kg)

Career information
- High school: East Rome
- College: Tennessee State
- NFL draft: 1983: 6th round, 165th overall pick

Career history
- Cincinnati Bengals (1983–1987); Buffalo Bills (1989–1990); Cleveland Browns (1992)*
- * Offseason or practice squad member only

Career NFL statistics
- Rushing yards: 3,133
- Average: 4
- Rushing touchdowns: 44
- Stats at Pro Football Reference

Lawrence D. Kinnebrew (born June 11, 1960) is an American former professional football player who was a running back in the National Football League (NFL). He played college football for the Tennessee State Tigers and was selected by the Cincinnati Bengals in the sixth round of the 1983 NFL draft. Standing 6 ft 1 in and 258-pounds, Kinnebrew played in seven NFL seasons from 1983 to 1987 with the Bengals and 1989–1990 with the Buffalo Bills.

On October 28, 1984, Kinnebrew set a Bengals record by scoring four rushing touchdowns in a game against the Houston Oilers. His best full season was 1985, when he gained 714 yards on 170 carries, scored nine rushing touchdowns, and had 22 pass receptions.

== NFL career statistics ==
Legend
**Bold**	Career high

=== Regular season ===
Year	Team	Games		Rushing					Receiving				
Year	Team	GP	GS	Att	Yds	Avg	Lng	TD	Rec	Yds	Avg	Lng	TD
1983	CIN	**16**	0	39	156	4.0	17	3	2	4	2.0	2	0
1984	CIN	**16**	4	154	623	4.0	23	**9**	19	159	8.4	22	**1**
1985	CIN	12	**11**	**170**	**714**	**4.2**	29	**9**	**22**	**187**	8.5	29	**1**
1986	CIN	**16**	9	131	519	4.0	39	8	13	136	10.5	**31**	**1**
1987	CIN	11	8	145	570	3.9	**52**	8	9	114	**12.7**	25	0
1989	BUF	15	10	131	533	4.1	25	6	5	60	12.0	18	0
1990	BUF	2	0	9	18	2.0	4	1	0	0	0.0	0	0
		88	42	779	3,133	4.0	52	44	70	660	9.4	31	3

=== Playoffs ===
Year	Team	Games		Rushing					Receiving				
Year	Team	GP	GS	Att	Yds	Avg	Lng	TD	Rec	Yds	Avg	Lng	TD
1989	BUF	1	1	7	17	2.4	6	0	1	7	7.0	7	0
		1	1	7	17	2.4	6	0	1	7	7.0	7	0

== Sources ==
- "Repeat Rape Trial For Kinnebrew". New York Times. June 22, 1993.
- Debra Dennis, "Kinnebrew Rape Case Dismissed", Cincinnati Post, August 31, 1993 (retrieved at westlaw.com)
