= Herb Welch =

American football player (born 1961)

No. 27, 20, 28
- Position: Safety

Personal information
- Born: January 12, 1961 (age 65); Los Angeles, California, U.S.
- Listed height: 5 ft 11 in (1.80 m)
- Listed weight: 180 lb (82 kg)

Career information
- High school: Earl Warren (Downey, California)
- College: UCLA
- NFL draft: 1985: 12th round, 326th overall pick

Career history
- New York Giants (1985–1988); Washington Redskins (1989); Detroit Lions (1990–1991); Sacramento Surge (1992)

Awards and highlights
- Super Bowl champion (XXI)

Career NFL statistics
- Interceptions: 7
- Fumble recoveries: 2
- Stats at Pro Football Reference

Herbert Doyan Welch Jr. (born January 12, 1961) is an American former professional football player who was a safety in the National Football League (NFL) for the New York Giants, Washington Redskins, and Detroit Lions. He also played in the World League of American Football (WLAF) for the Sacramento Surge. Welch played college football for the UCLA Bruins and was selected in the 12th round of the 1985 NFL draft.

On December 10, 1986, he replaced the injured Terry Kinard as the New York Giants' starting free safety for the remainder of that Super Bowl-winning season.
