= 1985 New York Giants season =

NFL team season

- Owner: Wellington Mara
- General manager: George Young
- Head coach: Bill Parcells
- Offensive coordinator: Ron Erhardt
- Defensive coordinator: Bill Belichick
- Home stadium: Giants Stadium

Results
- Record: 10–6
- Division place: 2nd NFC East
- Playoffs: Won Wild Card Playoffs (vs. 49ers) 17–3; Lost Divisional Playoffs (at Bears) 0–21
- Pro Bowlers: 5: QB Phil Simms; RB Joe Morris; DE Leonard Marshall; LB Lawrence Taylor; LB Harry Carson

The 1985 New York Giants season was the franchise’s 61st season in the National Football League (NFL). The Giants entered the season looking to improve on their 9–7 record in 1984, which was enough to qualify the team for the playoffs as the second wild-card team, and to return to the playoffs for the second consecutive year under third-year head coach Bill Parcells. The Giants managed to do both, finishing with ten victories for the first time since 1963 when the team won eleven games and finishing as the first wild-card team which earned the Giants a home playoff game at Giants Stadium.

They defeated the San Francisco 49ers 17–3 in that game, avenging their loss to the 49ers in the previous year's divisional playoffs. However, it was as far as the Giants could get as they were defeated by the eventual Super Bowl champion Chicago Bears in the divisional round at Soldier Field 21–0. Bill Parcells stated in "America's Game: 1986 Giants" about the game the Giants played against the Bears in the playoffs that "an honest evaluation of it, we could have probably beat that team one out of ten times. But that day was one of the days that that could have happened." At the time, the team set a record for most rushing yards in one season by a Giants team.

== Offseason ==
=== NFL draft ===
Round #	Pick #	Player	Position	College
1	19	George Adams	Running back	Kentucky
2	46	Stacy Robinson	Wide receiver	North Dakota State
3	58	Tyrone Davis	Defensive back	Clemson
3	73	Brian Johnston	Center	North Carolina
4	100	Mark Bavaro	Tight end	Notre Dame
5	132	Tracy Henderson	Wide receiver	Ohio State
6	159	Jack Oliver	Guard	Memphis State
8	213	Lee Rouson	Running back	Colorado
9	240	Frank Wright	Defensive tackle	South Carolina
10	272	Gregg Dubroc	Linebacker	LSU
11	299	Al Young	Defensive back	Virginia Tech
12	326	Herb Welch	Defensive back	UCLA

== Personnel ==
=== Staff ===
1985 New York Giants staff
Front office: President – Wellington Mara; General manager – George Young; Director of pro personnel – Tim Rooney; Head coaches: Head coach – Bill Parcells; Offensive coaches: Offensive coordinator – Ron Erhardt; Offensive backfield – Ray Handley; Receivers – Pat Hodgson; Tight ends – Mike Pope; Offensive line – Fred Hoaglin	Defensive coaches: Defensive coordinator – Bill Belichick; Defensive line – Lamar Leachman; Defensive backfield – Len Fontes; Defensive assistant – Mike Sweatman; Special teams coaches: Special teams – Romeo Crennel; Assistant special teams – Mike Sweatman; Strength and conditioning: Strength and Conditioning – Johnny Parker

=== Roster ===
1985 New York Giants roster
Quarterbacks (QB): 17 Jeff Rutledge; 11 Phil Simms; Running backs (RB): 33 George Adams; 26 Rob Carpenter; 44 Maurice Carthon; 30 Tony Galbreath; 20 Joe Morris; 22 Lee Rouson; Wide receivers (WR): 88 Bobby Johnson; 80 Phil McConkey; 81 Stacy Robinson; 87 Byron Williams; Tight ends (TE): 89 Mark Bavaro; 85 Don Hasselbeck; 82 Vyto Kab	Offensive linemen (OL): 67 Billy Ard G; 60 Brad Benson T; 61 Chris Godfrey G; 62 Conrad Goode C; 69 David Jordan G; 72 Gordon King T; 63 Karl Nelson T; 65 Bart Oates C; Defensive linemen (DL): 64 Jim Burt NT; 79 Dee Hardison DE; 70 Leonard Marshall DE; 75 George Martin DE; 76 Curtis McGriff DE; 71 Casey Merrill DE; 78 Jerome Sally NT	Linebackers (LB): 58 Carl Banks OLB; 53 Harry Carson ILB; 54 Andy Headen OLB; 57 Byron Hunt OLB; 51 Robbie Jones ILB; 55 Gary Reasons ILB; 56 Lawrence Taylor OLB; Defensive backs (DB): 48 Kenny Hill SS; 43 Terry Kinard FS; 34 Elvis Patterson CB; 21 Ted Watts SS; 27 Herb Welch FS; 23 Perry Williams CB; Special teams (ST): 5 Sean Landeta P; 3 Eric Schubert K	Reserve: 73 Kevin Belcher C (NF-Inj.); 29 Bill Currier S (IR); 24 Kenny Daniel CB (IR); 39 Tyrone Davis CB (IR); 6 Ali Haji-Sheikh K (IR); 36 Mark Haynes CB (IR); 15 Jeff Hostetler QB (IR); 68 Damian Johnson T (IR); 59 Brian Johnston C (IR); 86 Lionel Manuel WR (IR); 66 William Roberts T (IR); 38 John Tuggle RB (NF-Ill.); 84 Zeke Mowatt TE (IR); Rookies in italics

== Regular season ==
In a game against the Washington Redskins, Joe Theismann's career ended on November 18, 1985, when he suffered a gruesome comminuted compound fracture of his leg while being sacked by New York Giants linebackers Lawrence Taylor and Harry Carson during a Monday Night Football game telecast. The injury was voted the NFL's "Most Shocking Moment in History" by viewers in an ESPN poll, and the tackle was dubbed "The Hit That No One Who Saw It Can Ever Forget" by The Washington Post.

At the time, the Redskins had been attempting to run a "flea-flicker" play. The Giants' defense, however, was not fooled, and they tried to blitz Theismann. Taylor sandwiched Theismann into Carson and inadvertently landed his hip on Theismann's lower right leg, fracturing both the tibia and the fibula.

=== Schedule ===
Week	Date	Opponent	Result	Record	Venue	Attendance
1	September 8	**Philadelphia Eagles**	**W** 21–0	1–0	Giants Stadium	76,141
2	September 15	at Green Bay Packers	**L** 20–23	1–1	Lambeau Field	56,145
3	September 22	**St. Louis Cardinals**	**W** 27–17	2–1	Giants Stadium	74,987
4	September 29	at **Philadelphia Eagles**	**W** 16–10	3–1	Veterans Stadium	66,696
5	October 6	**Dallas Cowboys**	**L** 29–30	3–2	Giants Stadium	74,981
6	October 13	at Cincinnati Bengals	**L** 30–35	3–3	Riverfront Stadium	53,112
7	October 20	**Washington Redskins**	**W** 17–3	4–3	Giants Stadium	74,389
8	October 27	at New Orleans Saints	**W** 21–13	5–3	Louisiana Superdome	54,082
9	November 3	Tampa Bay Buccaneers	**W** 22–20	6–3	Giants Stadium	72,031
10	November 10	Los Angeles Rams	**W** 24–19	7–3	Giants Stadium	74,663
11	November 18	at **Washington Redskins**	**L** 21–23	7–4	RFK Stadium	53,371
12	November 24	at **St. Louis Cardinals**	**W** 34–3	8–4	Busch Memorial Stadium	41,248
13	December 1	Cleveland Browns	**L** 33–35	8–5	Giants Stadium	66,482
14	December 8	at Houston Oilers	**W** 35–14	9–5	Houston Astrodome	36,576
15	December 15	at **Dallas Cowboys**	**L** 21–28	9–6	Texas Stadium	62,310
16	December 21	Pittsburgh Steelers	**W** 28–10	10–6	Giants Stadium	66,785

Note: Intra-division opponents are in bold text.

=== Results ===
==== Week 1 ====
Team	1	2	3	4	Total
Eagles	0	0	0	0	0
• Giants	14	0	0	7	21

- Date: September 8
- Location: Giants Stadium, East Rutherford, New Jersey
- Game start: 1:00 p.m. EST
- Game weather: 78 °F (25.6 °C); wind 11 miles per hour (18 km/h; 9.6 kn)
- Referee: Fred Wyant
- TV announcers (CBS): Verne Lundquist and John Madden

==== Week 2 ====
Team	1	2	3	4	Total
Giants	0	6	7	7	20
• Packers	10	7	0	6	23

- Date: September 15
- Location: Lambeau Field, Green Bay, Wisconsin
- Game start: 3:00 p.m.
- Game weather: 56 °F (13.3 °C); wind 8 miles per hour (13 km/h; 7.0 kn)
- Referee: Ben Dreith
- TV announcers (CBS): Pat Summerall and John Madden

==== Week 3 ====
Team	1	2	3	4	Total
Cardinals	7	3	0	7	17
• Giants	7	3	10	7	27

- Date: September 22
- Location: Giants Stadium, East Rutherford, New Jersey
- Game start: 1:00 p.m.
- Game weather: 72 °F (22.2 °C); wind 13 miles per hour (21 km/h; 11 kn)
- Referee: Bob McElwee
- TV announcers (CBS): Pat Summerall and John Madden

==== Week 4 ====
Team	1	2	3	4	OT	Total
• Giants	0	0	10	0	6	16
Eagles	0	0	3	7	0	10

- Date: September 29
- Location: Veterans Stadium, Philadelphia
- Game start: 1:00 p.m.
- Game weather: 61 °F (16.1 °C); wind 5 miles per hour (8.0 km/h; 4.3 kn)
- Referee: Tom Dooley
- TV announcers (CBS): Pat Summerall John Madden

==== Week 5 ====
Team	1	2	3	4	Total
• Cowboys	7	7	7	9	30
Giants	3	3	20	3	29

- Date: October 6
- Location: Giants Stadium, East Rutherford, New Jersey
- Game start: 9:00 p.m.
- Game weather: 59 °F (15 °C); wind 16 miles per hour (26 km/h; 14 kn)
- Referee: Chuck Heberling
- TV announcers (ABC): Frank Gifford, O. J. Simpson, Joe Namath

==== Week 6 ====
Team	1	2	3	4	Total
Giants	0	3	17	10	30
• Bengals	14	7	7	7	35

- Date: October 13
- Location: Riverfront Stadium, Cincinnati
- Game start: 1:00 p.m.
- Game weather: 72 °F (22.2 °C); wind 11 miles per hour (18 km/h; 9.6 kn)
- Referee: Jim Tunney
- TV announcers (CBS): Pat Summerall and John Madden

==== Week 7 ====
Team	1	2	3	4	Total
Redskins	0	0	0	3	3
• Giants	0	7	7	3	17

- Date: October 20
- Location: Giants Stadium, East Rutherford, New Jersey
- Game start: 1:00 p.m.
- Game weather: 60 °F (15.6 °C); wind 14 miles per hour (23 km/h; 12 kn)
- Referee: Gene Barth
- TV announcers (CBS): Pat Summerall and John Madden

==== Week 8 ====
Team	1	2	3	4	Total
• Giants	0	7	0	14	21
Saints	3	0	0	10	13

- Date: October 27
- Location: Louisiana Superdome, New Orleans, Louisiana
- Game start: 3:00 p.m.
- Game weather: Indoors (dome)
- Referee: Bob Frederic
- TV announcers (CBS): Pat Summerall John Madden

==== Week 9 ====
Team	1	2	3	4	Total
Buccaneers	3	10	0	7	20
• Giants	3	3	10	6	22

- Date: November 3
- Location: Giants Stadium, East Rutherford, New Jersey
- Game start: 1:00 p.m. EST
- Game weather: 53 °F (11.7 °C); wind 21 miles per hour (34 km/h; 18 kn)
- Referee: Dick Jorgensen
- TV announcers (CBS): Pat Summerall and John Madden

==== Week 10 ====
Team	1	2	3	4	Total
Rams	7	6	3	3	19
• Giants	0	7	10	7	24

- Date: November 10
- Location: Giants Stadium, East Rutherford, New Jersey
- Game start: 1:00 p.m.
- Game weather: 63 °F (17.2 °C); wind 18 miles per hour (29 km/h; 16 kn)
- Referee: Jerry Markbreit
- TV announcers (CBS): Jack Buck and Hank Stram

==== Week 11 ====
Team	1	2	3	4	Total
Giants	7	0	14	0	21
• Redskins	7	0	7	9	23

- Date: November 18
- Location: RFK Stadium, Washington, D.C.
- Game start: 9:00 p.m. EST
- Game weather: 52 °F (11.1 °C); wind 6 miles per hour (9.7 km/h; 5.2 kn)
- Referee: Fred Wyant
- TV announcers (ABC): Frank Gifford, Joe Namath, and O.J. Simpson

==== Week 12 ====
Team	1	2	3	4	Total
• Giants	0	10	10	14	34
Cardinals	3	0	0	0	3

- Date: November 24
- Location: Busch Stadium, St. Louis, Missouri
- Game start: 3:00 p.m.
- Game weather: 30 °F (−1.1 °C); wind 12 miles per hour (19 km/h; 10 kn)
- Referee: Red Cashion

==== Week 13 ====
Team	1	2	3	4	Total
• Browns	7	14	0	14	35
Giants	7	13	3	10	33

- Date: December 1
- Location: Giants Stadium, East Rutherford, New Jersey
- Game start: 1:00 p.m.
- Game weather: 43 °F (6.1 °C); wind 20 miles per hour (32 km/h; 17 kn)
- Referee: Tom Dooley
- TV announcers (NBC): Marv Albert and Bob Griese

==== Week 14 ====
Team	1	2	3	4	Total
• Giants	14	21	0	0	35
Oilers	0	14	0	0	14

- Date: December 8
- Location: Houston Astrodome, Houston, Texas
- Game start: 1:00 p.m.
- Game weather: Indoors (dome)
- Referee: Bob McElwee
- TV announcers (CBS): Dick Stockton and Wayne Walker

==== Week 15 ====
Team	1	2	3	4	Total
Giants	0	14	0	7	21
• Cowboys	7	14	0	7	28

- Date: December 15
- Location: Texas Stadium, Irving, Texas
- Game start: 12:00 p.m.
- Game weather: 36 °F (2.2 °C); wind 11 miles per hour (18 km/h; 9.6 kn)
- Referee: Fred Silva
- TV announcers (CBS): Verne Lundquist and Terry Bradshaw

==== Week 16 ====
Team	1	2	3	4	Total
Steelers	0	3	7	0	10
• Giants	7	21	0	0	28

- Date: December 21
- Location: Giants Stadium, East Rutherford, New Jersey
- Game start: 12:30 p.m.
- Game weather: 27 °F (−2.8 °C); wind 15 miles per hour (24 km/h; 13 kn)
- Referee: Jerry Markbreit
- TV announcers (NBC): Dick Enberg and Merlin Olsen

=== Standings ===
NFC East
	W	L	T	PCT	DIV	CONF	PF	PA	STK
^{(3)} Dallas Cowboys	10	6	0	.625	6–2	7–5	357	333	L1
^{(4)} New York Giants	10	6	0	.625	5–3	8–4	399	283	W1
Washington Redskins	10	6	0	.625	4–4	6–6	297	312	W3
Philadelphia Eagles	7	9	0	.438	4–4	6–8	286	310	W1
St. Louis Cardinals	5	11	0	.313	1–7	3–9	278	414	L2

== Playoffs ==
=== Wild card ===
Team	1	2	3	4	Total
49ers	0	3	0	0	3
• Giants	3	7	7	0	17

- Date: December 29
- Location: Giants Stadium, East Rutherford, New Jersey
- Game start: 1:00 p.m.
- Game attendance: 75,842
- Game weather: Mostly cloudy; 36 °F or 2.2 °C; wind 16 miles per hour (26 km/h; 14 kn)
- Referee: Red Cashion
- TV announcers (CBS): Pat Summerall and John Madden

Even though the 49ers recorded 362 yards of total offense, with receiver Dwight Clark catching 8 passes for 120 yards, the Giants limited San Francisco to only one field goal. Meanwhile, New York running back Joe Morris rushed for 141 yards.

=== Divisional ===
Team	1	2	3	4	Total
Giants	0	0	0	0	0
• Bears	7	0	14	0	21

- Date: January 5
- Location: Soldier Field, Chicago
- Game start: 11:30 a.m.
- Game weather: 18 °F (−7.8 °C); wind 16 miles per hour (26 km/h; 14 kn)
- Referee: Ben Dreith
- TV announcers (CBS): Pat Summerrall & John Madden

The Giants lost to the eventual Super Bowl champion Chicago Bears.

== Awards and honors ==
- Phil Simms, Pro Bowl MVP
