= Fugitive Investigative Strike Team =

1981–1986 American police operations

The Fugitive Investigative Strike Team, or FIST operations were a series of operations conducted by the United States Marshals to capture violent fugitives wanted by state and federal law enforcement agencies in the United States. Nine operations were conducted between 1981 and 1986.

== History ==
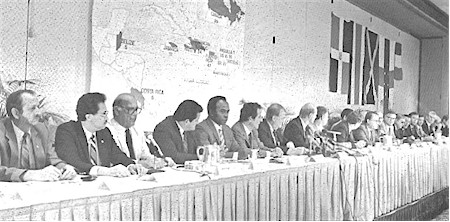
A press conference for FIST VIII

In October 1979, the Attorney General transferred the responsibility of investigating and monitoring certain fugitives from the Federal Bureau of Investigation to the U.S. Marshals Service. 105 U.S. Marshal Deputies were trained as Enforcement Specialists who would oversee investigation and apprehension of fugitives in their respective districts.

To support these deputies, the Marshals Service created the Fugitive Investigative Strike Team concept. Fugitive Investigation Strike Teams were meant to bolster districts experiencing a heavy load of fugitive activity. The FIST was made up of a number of investigators who could be deployed in operations to any district in the country in order to investigate and quickly apprehend fugitives. The primary targets of these operations were "Class 1" offenders, which included escaped federal prisoners, bail jumpers, parole violators and probation violators.

The FIST worked primarily in the United States but also collaborated with foreign officials to apprehend international fugitives, notably in the Caribbean.

== Operations ==
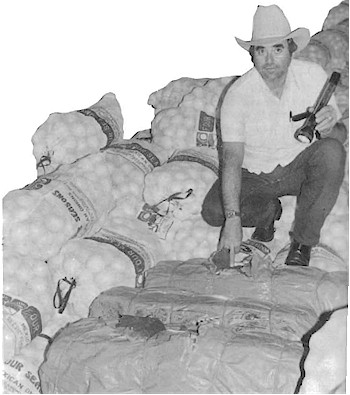
A U.S. Marshals Deputy seizes smuggled cocaine during the FIST IX operation

Nine FIST operations were conducted over five years in Florida, California, the New England states, Washington D.C., Michigan and the Southwest United States. The operations often included stings, such as the Puño Airlines sting.

Operation	Outcome	Related sting operation
FIST I	FIST I was a trial program conducted in the Southern District of Florida, which encompasses Miami. The operation lasted five weeks, starting on October 6, 1981. 76 fugitive felons were arrested.	
FIST II	The FIST II operation was conducted between December 1981 and February 1982 in Los Angeles, California. 102 fugitive felons were arrested.	
FIST III	FIST III was conducted in the New York Metropolitan Area for ten weeks, starting April 13, 1982. 303 fugitive felons were arrested.	
FIST IV	FIST IV was conducted in the Washington, D.C. area between September 7 through November 18, 1982. 614 arrests were made.	
FIST V	FIST V was conducted for ten weeks throughout Michigan. The operation began in mid 1983 and 928 arrests were made.	
FIST VI	FIST VI was a ten-week operation conducted in the State of California which resulted in 2,116 arrests	
FIST VII	The FIST VII operation resulted in the arrest of 3,309 fugitive felons. It was conducted in Connecticut, Delaware, Maryland, Massachusetts, New Jersey, New York, Pennsylvania and Rhode Island. The operation lasted for eight weeks, ending on November 20, 1984.	Flagship International Sports Television
FIST VIII	FIST VIII was conducted in Florida and the Caribbean in the spring of 1985. 3,816 fugitives were arrested.	Puño Airlines
FIST IX	FIST IX was conducted in Arizona, California, New Mexico, Texas and Mexico, beginning on February 18, 1986 and lasting eight weeks. More than 3,500 fugitives were arrested.	

== See also ==
- Operation Flagship
