= Konrāds Kalējs =

Latvian war criminal and Holocaust perpetrator

Konrāds Kalējs (Russian: Ко́нрад Ка́лейс; 26 June 1913 – 8 November 2001) was a Latvian soldier who was a Nazi collaborator and an alleged war criminal during World War II. He gained notoriety for evading calls for his prosecution across four countries, more than once under the threat of deportation.

== Early life ==
Kalējs was born in Riga, in the Governorate of Livonia of the Russian Empire (now Latvia) in 1913.

In 1935, he joined the Latvian army as a cadet and attained the rank of lieutenant four years later.

== Activities under Nazi occupation ==
In 1941, following the German invasion of Latvia as part of Operation Barbarossa, Kalējs deserted the Red Army (Latvia by that stage having been occupied by the Soviet Union) and became a member of the Nazi-controlled Latvian security police. Kalējs would later assert that he worked as a farmhand during this period.

== Life after World War II ==
At the end of the war Kalējs moved to Denmark. At the end of 1947 he came to Germany, probably because he was labelled as Wehrmachtsangehörige (WA) by the Danish authorities, and Denmark preferred to ship WA personnel to Germany as fast as possible. In 1950, he emigrated to Australia, where he was employed at the Bonegilla Migrant Reception and Training Centre in north-east Victoria. Becoming an Australian citizen in 1957, Kalējs left for the United States in 1959 for a lucrative career in property development.

== U.S. visa revoked ==
In 1984, Kalējs' Nazi connections were revealed, and he was arrested the following year after walking into the Puño Airlines sting operation. He was arrested by a US Marshal and Miami-Dade Police Detectives from the Department's Warrants Bureau, at his small motel room on Miami Beach.

After a four-year process, a United States court revoked Kalējs' visa, having found that there was "unequivocal evidence" that he had participated in war crimes in Latvia, although as an Australian citizen Kalējs was not prosecuted. The United States Department of Justice alleged that between July 1941 and June or July 1944, Kalējs was a company commander in the Arajs Kommando (Sonderkommando Arajs), one of several security police units which assisted the Einsatzgruppen death squads in killing Jews and Roma in Latvia, and in guarding the Salaspils concentration camp.

According to the Holocaust scholar Raul Hilberg, who gave evidence during the American proceedings against Kalējs, German documents established that the Einsatzkommando, the Arajs Kommando and similar groups were responsible for killing about 29,000 people (including about 26,000 Jews) by August 1941 and a further 27,800 Jews near Riga by the end of 1941 (the Arajs Kommando were responsible for about half of this total).

== Deportation and last years ==
Kalējs was deported from the United States to Australia after a six-year-long appeals process, and then moved to Canada, from where in 1997 he was again deported to Australia after a court revoked his visa, finding that he had "committed war crimes" as a collaborator.

In 1999, Kalējs left Australia for the United Kingdom, where he settled in Catthorpe, Leicestershire, staying at Catthorpe Manor, a nursing home run by the Latvian Welfare Fund. After the Home Secretary Jack Straw announced that moves would be made to deport Kalējs, he returned to Australia. The Simon Wiesenthal Center, which had uncovered Kalējs' presence in Catthorpe, criticised Straw's decision: a spokesperson labelled it a "missed opportunity" to prosecute him, and warned that "if he returns to Australia he will benefit from the country's lax attitude towards Nazi war criminals."

Latvian authorities charged Kalējs with war crimes offences in September 2000, relating to his participation at the Salaspils labour camp, and in May 2001 a Melbourne court ordered Kalējs' extradition to Latvia. Kalējs appealed this decision, and the ensuing proceedings were delayed by illness, with Kalējs reportedly suffering from dementia and prostate cancer. His lawyers claimed he was blind and had lost his memory.

Kalējs died in Melbourne in November 2001, aged 88. His lawyers criticised the government of Australia for being "inhumane and callous in its bid to extradite a sick old man" and described the process as a "witch hunt". In his last Australian interview, Kalējs admitted to working for the Nazi-run Latvian police.
