= Joe Drake (American football) =

American football player (born 1963)

No. 99, 61
- Position: Nose tackle

Personal information
- Born: May 28, 1963; San Francisco, California, U.S.
- Died: September 24, 1994 (aged 31); San Francisco, California, U.S.
- Listed height: 6 ft 2 in (1.88 m)
- Listed weight: 290 lb (132 kg)

Career information
- High school: Galileo (San Francisco)
- College: Arizona
- NFL draft: 1985: 9th round, 233rd overall pick

Career history
- Philadelphia Eagles (1985); Detroit Lions (1987)*; San Francisco 49ers (1987)
- * Offseason or practice squad member only

Awards and highlights
- Second-team All-Pac-10 (1984)

Career NFL statistics
- Games played: 19
- Stats at Pro Football Reference

Joe Drake (May 28, 1963 – September 24, 1994) was an American professional football player who played nose tackle for two seasons for the Philadelphia Eagles and San Francisco 49ers. He was selected by the Eagles in the ninth round of the 1985 NFL draft.
