= Bobby Johnson (defensive back) =

American football player (born 1960)

No. 34, 42, 24
- Position: Defensive back

Personal information
- Born: September 1, 1960 (age 66); La Grange, Texas, U.S.
- Listed height: 6 ft 0 in (1.83 m)
- Listed weight: 191 lb (87 kg)

Career information
- High school: La Grange
- College: Texas
- NFL draft: 1983: undrafted

Career history
- New Orleans Saints (1983–1984); St. Louis Cardinals (1985–1986); New Orleans Saints (1986)
- Stats at Pro Football Reference

Bobby Charles Johnson (born September 1, 1960) is an American former professional football player who was a defensive back for the New Orleans Saints and St. Louis Cardinals of the National Football League (NFL). He played college football for the Texas Longhorns.
