= Puño Airlines =

1985 fake airline sting by the U.S. Marshals Service

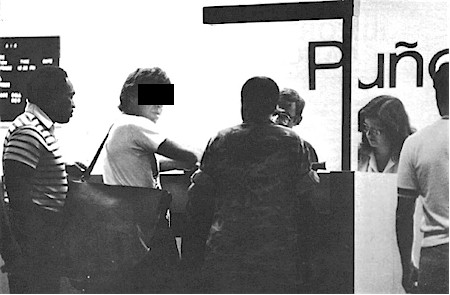
A wanted fugitive, Marshall Wolfman, turns up at the Puño Airlines to claim his "prize", tennis racket in hand.

In 1985, the Fugitive Investigative Strike Team VIII, part of the United States Marshals Service, set up Puño Airlines, a front organization to lure wanted criminals into the open where they could be arrested – by sending a letter suggesting the fugitive had won a free flight, a weekend in the Bahamas, and $350 in spending money. In total, 200 fugitives were sent the offer, and 14 were arrested after showing up to claim their winnings.

The FIST VIII had set up a Puño Airlines (puño is Spanish for "fist") booth beside Air Haiti in Miami International Airport, and did not tell any of the airport employees about the sting operation. They then offered to send a limo to pick up the "winners" and bring them to the airport, to which 13 fugitives agreed. Police later said that offering a drive to the airport helped ensure that suspects would not carry weapons, knowing there was a metal detector before boarding their flights.

Two of the arrested fugitives did not realise the nature of the operation: one phoned from prison to ask if he could reschedule his flight, while another begged cops to "take care of this next week", noting she had won a trip and wanted to enjoy her vacation first.

Marshall Wolfman turned up at the airport himself, but stood approximately 100 yards away from Puño Airlines, eyeing it suspiciously. After FIST VIII arranged to page a fictitious name to the counter over the loudspeakers, Wolfman presented himself at the replica ticket booth. Wolfman was wanted for theft of a rental car.

Konrāds Kalējs, a Latvian accused of collaboration with the Nazis, was also arrested in the operation.
