= NFC East =

Division of the National Football League

- Formerly: Western Conference Capitol Division (1967–1969)
- Conference: National Football Conference (NFC)
- League: National Football League (NFL)
- Sport: American football
- Founded: 1967
- No. of teams: 4
- Country: United States
- Most recent champion: Philadelphia Eagles (2025)
- Most titles: Dallas Cowboys (25)
- 2026 NFL season

NFC East teams location

The NFC East (formerly known as the Western Conference Capital Division) is one of the four divisions of the National Football Conference (NFC) in the National Football League (NFL). It has four members: the Dallas Cowboys, New York Giants, Philadelphia Eagles, and Washington Commanders.

The division was formed in 1967 as the Capitol Division and acquired its current name in 1970 following the AFL–NFL merger. The NFC East is currently the only division in the league in which all four current teams have not only won at least one Super Bowl, but also at least two. With 14 Super Bowl titles, the NFC East is currently the most successful division in the NFL during the Super Bowl era, with the AFC West second with ten titles. The Dallas Cowboys have the most Super Bowl titles in the division, winning five. The New York Giants have won four, the Washington Commanders have three, and the Philadelphia Eagles have two Super Bowl victories.

== History ==
The division's original name, NFL Capitol Division, derived from being centered on the capital of the United States, Washington, D.C., and the country's birthplace, Philadelphia. In 1967 and 1969, the teams in the division were Dallas, Philadelphia, Washington and the expansion team New Orleans Saints, with the New York Giants swapping divisions with the Saints for the 1968 season. This arrangement had been agreed in advance as a means to ensure all of the NFL's teams would be able to visit New York once in those three years. With the merger in 1970, following contentious negotiations culminating in a random draw, it was agreed that New York (along with the St. Louis Cardinals) would permanently return to the re-branded NFC East.

== General information ==
The NFC East teams have combined to be the most successful division in the Super Bowl era with 22 NFC championships and 14 Super Bowl victories, the highest marks of any division in the NFL. The division features a number of prominent rivalries such as the Cowboys–Eagles rivalry, Commanders–Cowboys rivalry and Eagles–Giants rivalry, among others. Because the division's teams are in some of the United States' largest media markets (New York No. 1, Dallas-Fort Worth No. 4, Philadelphia No. 5, and Washington No. 8), the NFC East receives a high amount of coverage from national sports media outlets. In the early 1990s the division claimed four consecutive Super Bowl champions, all against the Buffalo Bills, with the Giants and Washington respectively winning back-to-back in Super Bowls XXV and XXVI; and the Cowboys winning twice after in Super Bowls XXVII and XXVIII. Those same three teams won seven out of ten Super Bowls, from 1986–87 to 1995–96 (the 49ers won the other three during that span). Meanwhile, the Eagles are the most recent team in the division to win multiple Super Bowls, beating the Patriots 41–33 in Super Bowl LII and the Chiefs 40-22 in Super Bowl LIX.

The NFC East was the first division since the 2002 realignment to send 3 teams to the playoffs when the 2006-07 NFL playoffs had Philadelphia winning the division and Dallas and New York taking both Wild Card spots. On the other hand, the NFC East became one of three divisions to be won by a team with a losing record (the previous two being the NFC South and NFC West) when the then-Washington Football Team won the 2020 division crown with a 7–9 record.

The NFC East previously held a league record 20-year streak without a consecutive division champion. The Philadelphia Eagles won four consecutive titles from 2001 to 2004, and there was no repeat winner again until the Eagles won in 2024 and 2025.

The Philadelphia Eagles are the only NFC East team to actually play in the city of the team's naming. The other three teams play in suburbs of the major cities they are named after. The Dallas Cowboys play in Arlington, Texas, and are the only team in this division not based in the Eastern Time Zone (the Cowboys are based in the Central Time Zone). The Washington Commanders play in Landover, Maryland, and the New York Giants play in East Rutherford, New Jersey, where they share a stadium with the New York Jets. Analogously, three of the four AFC East teams do not actually play within the city of their naming. (The Patriots geographical identifier is New England, being named for the region the team plays in.)

As of 2024, all four teams in the division were in the top ten of most valuable NFL franchises (Cowboys #1; Giants #2; Commanders #7; Eagles #9).

In Weeks 5 and 6 of the 2026 NFL season, the NFC East became the first division in NFL history to be winless in consecutive weeks in which all teams in the division played a game. This was despite the Giants and Commanders playing each other in Week 5; the game ended in a 27-27 tie.

== Results ==
=== Team success ===
Team success
Team	Years in division	Playoff berths	Division championships	NFC Championship Game appearances	Super Bowl appearances	Super Bowl wins	Refs
Washington Commanders	1967–present	19	10	7	5	3	
Dallas Cowboys	1967–present	35	25	14	8	5	
Philadelphia Eagles	1967–present	28	14	9	5	2	
New York Giants	1968, 1970–present	16	8	5	5	4	
Arizona Cardinals	1970–2001	4	2	0	0	0	
New Orleans Saints	1967, 1969	0	0	0	0	0	

=== Season-by-season ===
Table legend
Super Bowl champions ‡	Conference champions ^{*}	Division champions ^{^}	Wild card berth ^{#}

NFC East yearly standings and team records
Season	Team (record)					Notes	Refs
Season	1st	2nd	3rd	4th	5th	Notes	Refs
Western Conference Capitol Division
1967	Dallas (9–5) ^{^}	Philadelphia (6–7–1)	Washington (5–6–3)	New Orleans (3–11)	—	The Capitol Division was formed with four inaugural members. An expansion team, the New Orleans Saints, joined the division. The Dallas Cowboys, the Philadelphia Eagles and the Washington Redskins joined from the Eastern Division.	
1968	Dallas (12–2) ^{^}	Giants (7–7)	Washington (5–9)	Philadelphia (2–12)	—	The New York Giants joined from the Century Division. The New Orleans Saints left to join the Century Division.	
1969	Dallas (11–2–1) ^{^}	Washington (7–5–2)	New Orleans (5–9)	Philadelphia (4–9–1)	—	The New Orleans Saints rejoined from the Century Division. The New York Giants left to rejoin the Century Division.	
NFC East Division
1970	Dallas (10–4) ^{*}	Giants (9–5)	St. Louis (8–5–1)	Washington (6–8)	Philadelphia (3–10–1)	With the completion of the AFL–NFL merger, the Cardinals, Cowboys, Eagles, Giants, and Redskins were placed into the East Division of the National Football Conference (NFC).	
1971	Dallas (11–3) ‡	Washington (9–4–1) ^{#}	Philadelphia (6–7–1)	St. Louis (4–9–1)	Giants (4–10)		
1972	Washington (11–3) ^{*}	Dallas (10–4) ^{#}	Giants (8–6)	St. Louis (4–9–1)	Philadelphia (2–11–1)		
1973	Dallas (10–4) ^{^}	Washington (10–4) ^{#}	Philadelphia (5–8–1)	St. Louis (4–9–1)	Giants (2–11–1)		
1974	St. Louis (10–4) ^{^}	Washington (10–4) ^{#}	Dallas (8–6)	Philadelphia (7–7)	Giants (2–12)		
1975	St. Louis (11–3) ^{^}	Dallas (10–4) ^{*}	Washington (8–6)	Giants (5–9)	Philadelphia (4–10)		
1976	Dallas (11–3) ^{^}	Washington (10–4) ^{#}	St. Louis (10–4)	Philadelphia (4–10)	Giants (3–11)		
1977	Dallas (12–2) ‡	Washington (9–5)	St. Louis (7–7)	Philadelphia (5–9)	Giants (5–9)		
1978	Dallas (12–4) ^{*}	Philadelphia (9–7) ^{#}	Washington (8–8)	St. Louis (6–10)	Giants (6–10)		
1979	Dallas (11–5) ^{^}	Philadelphia (11–5) ^{#}	Washington (10–6)	Giants (6–10)	St. Louis (5–11)		
1980	Philadelphia (12–4) ^{*}	Dallas (12–4) ^{#}	Washington (6–10)	St. Louis (5–11)	Giants (4–12)		
1981	Dallas (12–4) ^{^}	Philadelphia (10–6) ^{#}	Giants (9–7) ^{#}	Washington (8–8)	St. Louis (7–9)		
1982	Washington (8–1) ‡	Dallas (6–3) ^{#}	St. Louis (5–4) ^{#}	Giants (4–5)	Philadelphia (3–6)	The NFL season was shortened to nine games by a strike, with divisions temporarily suspended and standings based on conference alone.	
1983	Washington (14–2) ^{*}	Dallas (12–4) ^{#}	St. Louis (8–7–1)	Philadelphia (5–11)	Giants (3–12–1)		
1984	Washington (11–5) ^{^}	Giants (9–7) ^{#}	St. Louis (9–7)	Dallas (9–7)	Philadelphia (6–9–1)		
1985	Dallas (10–6) ^{^}	Giants (10–6) ^{#}	Washington (10–6)	Philadelphia (7–9)	St. Louis (5–11)		
1986	Giants (14–2) ‡	Washington (12–4) ^{#}	Dallas (7–9)	Philadelphia (5–10–1)	St. Louis (4–11–1)		
1987	Washington (11–4) ‡	Dallas (7–8)	St. Louis (7–8)	Philadelphia (7–8)	Giants (6–9)	The strike of 1987 reduced the regular season from 16 to 15 games.	
1988	Philadelphia (10–6) ^{^}	Giants (10–6)	Washington (7–9)	Phoenix (7–9)	Dallas (3–13)	The St. Louis Cardinals relocated and became the Phoenix Cardinals.	
1989	Giants (12–4) ^{^}	Philadelphia (11–5) ^{#}	Washington (10–6)	Phoenix (5–11)	Dallas (1–15)		
1990	Giants (13–3) ‡	Philadelphia (10–6) ^{#}	Washington (10–6) ^{#}	Dallas (7–9)	Phoenix (5–11)		
1991	Washington (14–2) ‡	Dallas (11–5) ^{#}	Philadelphia (10–6)	Giants (8–8)	Phoenix (4–12)		
1992	Dallas (13–3) ‡	Philadelphia (11–5) ^{#}	Washington (9–7) ^{#}	Giants (6–10)	Phoenix (4–12)		
1993	Dallas (12–4) ‡	Giants (11–5) ^{#}	Philadelphia (8–8)	Phoenix (7–9)	Washington (4–12)		
1994	Dallas (12–4) ^{^}	Giants (9–7)	Arizona (8–8)	Philadelphia (7–9)	Washington (3–13)	The Phoenix Cardinals became the Arizona Cardinals.	
1995	Dallas (12–4) ‡	Philadelphia (10–6) ^{#}	Washington (6–10)	Giants (5–11)	Arizona (4–12)		
1996	Dallas (10–6) ^{^}	Philadelphia (10–6) ^{#}	Washington (9–7)	Arizona (7–9)	Giants (6–10)		
1997	Giants (10–5–1) ^{^}	Washington (8–7–1)	Philadelphia (6–9–1)	Dallas (6–10)	Arizona (4–12)		
1998	Dallas (10–6) ^{^}	Arizona (9–7) ^{#}	Giants (8–8)	Washington (6–10)	Philadelphia (3–13)		
1999	Washington (10–6) ^{^}	Dallas (8–8) ^{#}	Giants (7–9)	Arizona (6–10)	Philadelphia (5–11)		
2000	Giants (12–4) ^{*}	Philadelphia (11–5) ^{#}	Washington (8–8)	Dallas (5–11)	Arizona (3–13)		
2001	Philadelphia (11–5) ^{^}	Washington (8–8)	Giants (7–9)	Arizona (7–9)	Dallas (5–11)		
2002	Philadelphia (12–4) ^{^}	Giants (10–6) ^{#}	Washington (7–9)	Dallas (5–11)	—	The NFL realigned to create four divisions in both conferences with four teams in each division. The Arizona Cardinals moved to the NFC West.	
2003	Philadelphia (12–4) ^{^}	Dallas (10–6) ^{#}	Washington (5–11)	Giants (4–12)	—		
2004	Philadelphia (13–3) ^{*}	Giants (6–10)	Dallas (6–10)	Washington (6–10)	—		
2005	Giants (11–5) ^{^}	Washington (10–6) ^{#}	Dallas (9–7)	Philadelphia (6–10)	—		
2006	Philadelphia (10–6) ^{^}	Dallas (9–7) ^{#}	Giants (8–8) ^{#}	Washington (5–11)	—		
2007	Dallas (13–3) ^{^}	Giants (10–6) ‡	Washington (9–7) ^{#}	Philadelphia (8–8)	—		
2008	Giants (12–4) ^{^}	Philadelphia (9–6–1) ^{#}	Dallas (9–7)	Washington (8–8)	—		
2009	Dallas (11–5) ^{^}	Philadelphia (11–5) ^{#}	Giants (8–8)	Washington (4–12)	—		
2010	Philadelphia (10–6) ^{^}	Giants (10–6)	Dallas (6–10)	Washington (6–10)	—		
2011	Giants (9–7) ‡	Philadelphia (8–8)	Dallas (8–8)	Washington (5–11)	—		
2012	Washington (10–6) ^{^}	Giants (9–7)	Dallas (8–8)	Philadelphia (4–12)	—		
2013	Philadelphia (10–6) ^{^}	Dallas (8–8)	Giants (7–9)	Washington (3–13)	—		
2014	Dallas (12–4) ^{^}	Philadelphia (10–6)	Giants (6–10)	Washington (4–12)	—		
2015	Washington (9–7) ^{^}	Philadelphia (7–9)	Giants (6–10)	Dallas (4–12)	—		
2016	Dallas (13–3) ^{^}	Giants (11–5) ^{#}	Washington (8–7–1)	Philadelphia (7–9)	—		
2017	Philadelphia (13–3) ‡	Dallas (9–7)	Washington (7–9)	Giants (3–13)	—		
2018	Dallas (10–6) ^{^}	Philadelphia (9–7) ^{#}	Washington (7–9)	Giants (5–11)	—		
2019	Philadelphia (9–7) ^{^}	Dallas (8–8)	Giants (4–12)	Washington (3–13)	—		
2020	Washington (7–9) ^{^}	Giants (6–10)	Dallas (6–10)	Philadelphia (4–11–1)	—	The Washington Redskins temporarily became the Washington Football Team.	
2021	Dallas (12–5) ^{^}	Philadelphia (9–8) ^{#}	Washington (7–10)	Giants (4–13)	—	The NFL expanded its season from 16 to 17 games a year.	
2022	Philadelphia (14–3) ^{*}	Dallas (12–5) ^{#}	Giants (9–7–1) ^{#}	Washington (8–8–1)	—	The Washington Football Team permanently became the Washington Commanders.	
2023	Dallas (12–5) ^{^}	Philadelphia (11–6) ^{#}	Giants (6–11)	Washington (4–13)	—		
2024	Philadelphia (14–3) ‡	Washington (12–5) ^{#}	Dallas (7–10)	Giants (3–14)	—		
2025	Philadelphia (11–6) ^{^}	Dallas (7–9–1)	Washington (5–12)	Giants (4–13)	—		
2026	Giants (5–3–1)	Dallas (4–5)	Washington (3–5–1)	Philadelphia (2–7)	—		

== See also ==
- NFL rivalries § NFC East
