= Gordon Banks (American football) =

American football player (born 1958)

No. 80, 87, 88
- Position: Wide receiver

Personal information
- Born: March 12, 1958 (age 68); Los Angeles, California, U.S.
- Listed height: 5 ft 10 in (1.78 m)
- Listed weight: 175 lb (79 kg)

Career information
- High school: Loyola (Los Angeles)
- College: Stanford
- NFL draft: 1980: undrafted

Career history
- New Orleans Saints (1980–1981); San Diego Chargers (1982)*; Oakland Invaders (1983–1985); Dallas Cowboys (1985–1987)
- * Offseason or practice squad member only

Career NFL statistics
- Receptions: 35
- Receiving yards: 458
- Receiving touchdowns: 1
- Stats at Pro Football Reference

Gordon Gerard Banks (born March 12, 1958) is an American former professional football player who was a wide receiver in the National Football League (NFL) for the New Orleans Saints and Dallas Cowboys. He also was a member of the Oakland Invaders of the United States Football League (USFL). He played college football for the Stanford Cardinal.

== Early life ==
Banks attended Loyola High School in the Pico-Union neighborhood, lettering in football and track.

He accepted a football scholarship from Stanford University, where he was a backup at wide receiver. In 1977, he was second on the team with 16 kickoff returns for 222 yards (13.9-yard average).

In 1978, he led the team with 13 kickoff returns for 269 yards (20.7-yard average). He finished his college career with 29 receptions for 294 yards and 5 touchdowns.

He became a standout in track, running the 100 metres in 10.33 seconds.

== Professional career ==
=== New Orleans Saints ===
Banks was signed as an undrafted free agent by the New Orleans Saints after the 1980 NFL draft. As a rookie, he played mainly on special teams and had 4 tackles. He was waived on October 12, 1981.

=== San Diego Chargers ===
On July 8, 1982, he signed with the San Diego Chargers as a free agent. He was cut on August 31.

=== Oakland Invaders (USFL) ===
In 1983, he signed as a free agent with the Oakland Invaders of the United States Football League, where he was a teammate of Anthony Carter. In his first year, he registered 61 receptions for 855 yards and 2 touchdowns. In 1984, he tallied 64 receptions (first on the team) for 937 yards (first on the team) and 5 touchdowns.

In 1985, the Invaders were merged with the Michigan Panthers and he became a teammate of Anthony Carter and Bobby Hebert. He recorded 62 receptions (second on the team) for 1,115 receiving yards (second on the team) and 5 touchdowns.

Banks finished as one of the career receiving leaders in USFL history, recording 187 receptions for 2,907 yards. He was the only player to catch a pass in all 54 USFL games and was the Invaders' All-time leading receiver.

=== Dallas Cowboys ===
When the USFL folded in 1985, he signed in mid-season as a free agent with the Dallas Cowboys, reuniting with Dick Nolan, who was his head coach with the Saints. At the time, he was the team's fastest player. He was activated On December 5, playing as a punt returner in 2 regular season games and one playoff game.

In 1986, he was named a starter at wide receiver for the season opener against the New York Giants, in place of an injured Mike Renfro. He had 15 receptions for 178 yards before Renfro returned to the lineup in the sixth game. He took over the punt return duties in the seventh game, leading the team with a 5.9-yard average. He finished the season with 17 receptions for 202 yards and 27 punt returns for 160 yards.

The next season, injuries on the wide receiver corps, forced the Cowboys to start him in 4 contests. In 5 games he had 15 receptions for 231 yards and one touchdown, but suffered a stress fracture in his foot that forced him to miss the last 7 games and eventually ended his professional career. He was waived on August 28, 1988.

== Personal life ==
Banks and his wife Derozette are the senior pastors at Overcomer Covenant Church in Auburn, Washington.
