= Scott Bergold =

American football player (born 1961)

No. 74
- Position: Offensive tackle

Personal information
- Born: November 19, 1961 (age 64); Milwaukee, Wisconsin, U.S.
- Listed height: 6 ft 7 in (2.01 m)
- Listed weight: 263 lb (119 kg)

Career information
- High school: Wauwatosa West
- College: Wisconsin
- NFL draft: 1985: 2nd round, 51st overall pick

Career history
- St. Louis Cardinals (1985)

Career NFL statistics
- Games played: 16
- Stats at Pro Football Reference

Scott Bergold (born November 19, 1961) is an American former professional football player who was an offensive tackle for the St. Louis Cardinals of the National Football League (NFL). He played college football for the Wisconsin Badgers. He was selected by the Cardinals in the second round of the 1985 NFL draft and played that season with the team.
