= 1985 Cincinnati Bengals season =

NFL team season

- Owner: Paul Brown
- General manager: Paul Brown
- Head coach: Sam Wyche
- Home stadium: Riverfront Stadium

Results
- Record: 7–9
- Division place: 2nd AFC Central
- Playoffs: Did not qualify

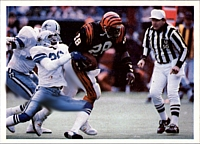
The Bengals hosting the Cowboys in December 1985.

The 1985 season was the Cincinnati Bengals' 16th season in the National Football League (NFL), their 18th overall, and their second under head coach Sam Wyche. Wide receiver Isaac Curtis, a premier Bengal for 12 years, retired shortly before training camp opened. Second-year quarterback Boomer Esiason replaced Ken Anderson. The Bengals set a club scoring record with 441 points.

== Offseason ==
=== NFL draft ===
1985 Cincinnati Bengals draft
Round	Pick	Player	Position	College	Notes
1	13	Eddie Brown *	Wide receiver	Miami (FL)	
1	25	Emanuel King	Linebacker	Alabama	
2	43	Carl Zander	Linebacker	Tennessee	
3	70	Sean Thomas	Defensive back	TCU	
4	97	Anthony Tuggle	Defensive back	Nicholls State	
5	127	Tony Degrate	Defensive tackle	Texas	
5	129	Lee Davis	Defensive back	Mississippi	
6	148	Eric Stokes	Offensive tackle	Northeastern	
6	154	Keith Lester	Tight end	Murray State	
7	172	Kim Locklin	Running back	New Mexico State	
7	181	Joe Walter	Offensive tackle	Texas Tech	
8	211	Dave Strobel	Linebacker	Iowa	
9	238	Keith Cruise	Defensive end	Northwestern	
10	265	Bernard King	Linebacker	Syracuse	
11	296	Harold Stanfield	Tight end	Mississippi College	
12	322	Louis Garza	Offensive tackle	New Mexico State	
Made roster * Made at least one Pro Bowl during career

=== Undrafted free agents ===
1985 undrafted free agents of note
Player	Position	College
Keith Cruise	Defensive end	Northwestern
Wayne Peace	Quarterback	Florida
Rick Rogers	Running back	Michigan

== Personnel ==
=== Staff / Coaches ===
1985 Cincinnati Bengals staff
Front office: Owner/president – John Sawyer; Owner/general manager – Paul Brown; Head coaches: Head coach – Sam Wyche; Offensive coaches: Offensive coordinator – Bruce Coslet; Quarterbacks – Bruce Coslet; Running backs – Jim Anderson; Wide receivers – Bruce Coslet; Tight ends – Bill Johnson; Offensive line – Jim McNally	Defensive coaches: Defensive coordinator – Dick LeBeau; Defensive line – Bill Urbanik; Linebackers – Dick Selcer; Strength and conditioning: Strength and Conditioning – Kim Wood

=== Roster ===
1985 Cincinnati Bengals roster
Quarterbacks (QB): 14 Ken Anderson; 7 Boomer Esiason; 15 Turk Schonert; Running backs (RB): 40 Charles Alexander; 21 James Brooks; 36 Stanford Jennings; 28 Larry Kinnebrew; Wide receivers (WR): 81 Eddie Brown; 80 Cris Collinsworth; 86 Steve Kreider; 88 Mike Martin; 42 Clay Pickering; Tight ends (TE): 83 M. L. Harris; 82 Rodney Holman	Offensive linemen (OL): 74 Brian Blados G; 64 Bruce Kozerski C/G; 65 Max Montoya G; 78 Anthony Muñoz T; 75 Bruce Reimers G/T; 52 Dave Rimington C; 63 Joe Walter T; 77 Mike Wilson T; Defensive linemen (DL): 61 Jerry Boyarsky NT; 79 Ross Browner DE; 76 Glen Collins DE; 73 Eddie Edwards DE; 69 Tim Krumrie NT	Linebackers (LB): 53 Leo Barker ILB; 50 Glenn Cameron ILB; 51 Tom Dinkel OLB; 90 Emanuel King OLB; 59 Jeff Schuh OLB; 56 Ron Simpkins ILB; 57 Reggie Williams OLB; 91 Carl Zander ILB; Defensive backs (DB): 34 Louis Breeden CB; 22 James Griffin FS; 20 Ray Horton CB; 37 Robert Jackson FS; 26 Bobby Kemp SS; 25 John Simmons CB; 35 Jimmy Turner CB; 41 Sam Washington CB; Special teams (ST): 3 Jim Breech K; 87 Pat McInally P	Reserve: 30 Bill Johnson RB (IR); 89 Don Kern TE (IR); 32 Stanley Wilson RB (Susp.); Rookies in italics

== Regular season ==
=== Schedule ===
Week	Date	Opponent	Result	Record	Venue	Attendance
1	September 8	Seattle Seahawks	**L** 24–28	0–1	Riverfront Stadium	51,625
2	September 15	at St. Louis Cardinals	**L** 27–41	0–2	Busch Memorial Stadium	46,321
3	September 22	San Diego Chargers	**L** 41–44	0–3	Riverfront Stadium	52,270
4	September 30	at **Pittsburgh Steelers**	**W** 37–24	1–3	Three Rivers Stadium	59,541
5	October 6	New York Jets	**L** 20–29	1–4	Riverfront Stadium	51,785
6	October 13	New York Giants	**W** 35–30	2–4	Riverfront Stadium	53,112
7	October 20	at **Houston Oilers**	**L** 27–44	2–5	Houston Astrodome	35,590
8	October 27	**Pittsburgh Steelers**	**W** 26–21	3–5	Riverfront Stadium	55,421
9	November 3	at Buffalo Bills	**W** 23–17	4–5	Rich Stadium	25,640
10	November 10	**Cleveland Browns**	**W** 27–10	5–5	Riverfront Stadium	57,293
11	November 17	at Los Angeles Raiders	**L** 6–13	5–6	Los Angeles Memorial Coliseum	52,501
12	November 24	at **Cleveland Browns**	**L** 6–24	5–7	Cleveland Municipal Stadium	74,439
13	December 1	**Houston Oilers**	**W** 45–27	6–7	Riverfront Stadium	46,140
14	December 8	Dallas Cowboys	**W** 50–24	7–7	Riverfront Stadium	56,936
15	December 15	at Washington Redskins	**L** 24–27	7–8	RFK Stadium	50,544
16	December 22	at New England Patriots	**L** 23–34	7–9	Sullivan Stadium	57,953
Note: Intra-division opponents are in **bold** text.

=== Game summaries ===
==== Week 1 ====
Week 1: Seattle Seahawks at Cincinnati Bengals – Game summary

Quarter	1	2	3	4	Total
**Seahawks**	7	14	0	7	**28**
Bengals	0	10	14	0	**24**

at Riverfront Stadium, Cincinnati

- Date: September 8, 1985
- Game time: 1:00 pm EST
- Game weather: 79 °F (26 °C), wind 8 miles per hour (13 km/h; 7.0 kn)
- Game attendance: 51,625
- Referee: Fred Silva
- TV announcers (NBC): Don Criqui (play by play), Bob Trumpy (color commentator)

Scoring summary

Quarter	Time	Drive			Team	Scoring information	Score	
Quarter	Time	Plays	Yards	TOP	Team	Scoring information	Seahawks	Bengals
1					Seahawks	Byron Walker 28-yard touchdown reception from Dave Krieg, Norm Johnson kick good	7	0
2					Bengals	James Brooks 15-yard touchdown run, Jim Breech kick good	7	7
2					Seahawks	Daryl Turner 6-yard touchdown reception from Dave Krieg, Norm Johnson kick good	14	7
2					Seahawks	Charle Young 19-yard touchdown reception from Dave Krieg, Norm Johnson kick good	21	7
2					Bengals	22-yard field goal by Jim Breech	21	10
3					Bengals	James Brooks 17-yard touchdown reception from Turk Schonert, Jim Breech kick good	21	17
3					Bengals	Larry Kinnebrew 9-yard touchdown run, Jim Breech kick good	21	24
4					Seahawks	Curt Warner 11-yard touchdown run, Norm Johnson kick good	28	24
"TOP" = time of possession. For other American football terms, see Glossary of American football.							28	21

==== Week 2 ====
Week 2: Cincinnati Bengals at St. Louis Cardinals – Game summary

Quarter	1	2	3	4	Total
Bengals	7	7	3	10	**27**
**Cardinals**	7	10	10	14	**41**

at Busch Stadium, St. Louis

- Date: September 15, 1985
- Game time: 1:00pm CST
- Game weather: 66 °F (19 °C), wind 8 miles per hour (13 km/h; 7.0 kn)
- Game attendance: 46,321

Scoring summary

Quarter	Time	Drive			Team	Scoring information	Score	
Quarter	Time	Plays	Yards	TOP	Team	Scoring information	Bengals	Cardinals
1					Bengals	Stanford Jennings 4-yard touchdown reception from Ken Anderson, Jim Breech kick good	7	0
1					Cardinals	Earl Ferrell 27-yard touchdown reception from Neil Lomax, Neil O'Donoghue kick good	7	7
2					Bengals	Eddie Brown 44-yard touchdown reception from Ken Anderson, Jim Breech kick good	14	7
2					Cardinals	Ottis Anderson 1-yard touchdown run, Neil O'Donoghue kick good	14	14
2					Cardinals	46-yard field goal by Neil O'Donoghue	14	17
3					Cardinals	Roy Green 25-yard touchdown reception from Neil Lomax, Neil O'Donoghue kick good	14	24
3					Bengals	33-yard field goal by Jim Breech	17	24
3					Cardinals	49-yard field goal by Neil O'Donoghue	17	27
4					Bengals	47-yard field goal by Jim Breech	20	27
4					Cardinals	Stump Mitchell 1-yard touchdown run, Neil O'Donoghue kick good	20	34
4					Cardinals	Perry Harrington 1-yard touchdown run, Neil O'Donoghue kick good	20	41
4					Bengals	Larry Kinnebrew 29-yard touchdown reception from Boomer Esiason, Jim Breech kick good	27	41
"TOP" = time of possession. For other American football terms, see Glossary of American football.							27	41

==== Week 3 ====
Week 3: San Diego Chargers at Cincinnati Bengals – Game summary

Quarter	1	2	3	4	Total
**Chargers**	3	17	14	10	**44**
Bengals	7	6	21	7	**41**

at Riverfront Stadium, Cincinnati

- Date: September 22, 1985
- Game time: 1:00pm EST
- Game weather: 71 °F (22 °C), wind 9 miles per hour (14 km/h; 7.8 kn)
- Game attendance: 52,270
- Referee: Gene Barth
- TV announcers (NBC): Bob Stone and Bob Kuechenberg

Scoring summary

Quarter	Time	Drive			Team	Scoring information	Score	
Quarter	Time	Plays	Yards	TOP	Team	Scoring information	Chargers	Bengals
1					Chargers	20-yard field goal by Bob Thomas	3	0
1					Bengals	Cris Collinsworth 18-yard touchdown reception from Boomer Esiason, Jim Breech kick good	3	7
2					Chargers	Eric Sievers 4-yard touchdown reception from Dan Fouts, Bob Thomas kick good	10	7
2					Chargers	Eric Sievers 5-yard touchdown reception from Dan Fouts, Bob Thomas kick good	17	7
2					Bengals	James Brooks 1-yard touchdown run, Jim Breech kick missed	17	13
2					Chargers	28-yard field goal by Bob Thomas	20	13
3					Bengals	Cris Collinsworth 16-yard touchdown reception from Boomer Esiason, Jim Breech kick good	20	20
3					Chargers	Pete Holohan 3-yard touchdown reception from Dan Fouts, Bob Thomas kick good	27	20
3					Bengals	Larry Kinnebrew 4-yard touchdown run, Jim Breech kick good	27	27
3					Bengals	Stanford Jennings 11-yard touchdown reception from Boomer Esiason, Jim Breech kick good	27	34
3					Chargers	Lionel James 56-yard touchdown run, Bob Thomas kick good	34	34
4					Bengals	Larry Kinnebrew 8-yard touchdown run, Jim Breech kick good	34	41
4					Chargers	Lionel James 60-yard touchdown reception from Dan Fouts, Bob Thomas kick good	41	41
4					Chargers	34-yard field goal by Bob Thomas	44	41
"TOP" = time of possession. For other American football terms, see Glossary of American football.							44	41

==== Week 4 ====
Team	1	2	3	4	Total
• Bengals	0	14	7	16	37
Steelers	0	10	14	0	24

- Date: September 30
- Location: Three Rivers Stadium, Pittsburgh
- Game start: 9:00 p.m. EST
- Game weather: 62 °F (17 °C); wind 7 mph (11 km/h)
- Referee: Pat Haggerty
- Television network: ABC

Scoring summary
Q2	PIT	Lipps 15 yard pass from Malone (Anderson kick)	PIT 7–0
Q2	CIN	Brooks 14 yard run (Breech kick)	Tie 7–7
Q2	CIN	Holman 26 yard pass from Esiason (Breech kick)	CIN 14–7
Q2	PIT	Anderson 29 yard field goal	CIN 14–10
Q3	CIN	Brown 8 yard pass from Esiason (Breech kick)	CIN 21–10
Q3	PIT	Stallworth 17 yard pass from Malone (Anderson kick)	CIN 21–17
Q3	PIT	Erenberg 4 yard pass from Malone (Anderson kick)	PIT 24–21
Q4	CIN	Holman 4 yard pass from Esiason (Breech kick)	CIN 28–24
Q4	CIN	Breech 32 yard field goal	CIN 31–24
Q4	CIN	Brooks 32 yard run (pass failed)	CIN 37–24

==== Week 6 ====
Team	1	2	3	4	Total
Giants	0	3	17	10	30
• Bengals	14	7	7	7	35

- Date: October 13
- Location: Riverfront Stadium, Cincinnati
- Game start: 1:00 p.m.
- Game weather: 72 °F (22 °C), wind 11 mph (18 km/h)
- Referee: Jim Tunney
- TV announcers (CBS): Pat Summerall and John Madden

Scoring summary
1	CIN	Cris Collinsworth 16 yard pass from Boomer Esiason (Jim Breech kick)	Bengals 7–0
1	CIN	James Brooks 27 yard pass from Boomer Esiason (Jim Breech kick)	Bengals 14–0
2	CIN	James Brooks 5 yard run (Jim Breech kick)	Bengals 21–0
2	NYG	Jess Atkinson 33 yard field goal	Bengals 21–3
3	NYG	Joe Morris 1 yard run (Jess Atkinson kick)	Bengals 21–10
3	NYG	Jess Atkinson 14 yard run (Jess Atkinson kick)	Bengals 21–17
3	NYG	Jess Atkinson 37 yard field goal	Bengals 21–20
3	CIN	James Griffin 24 yard interception return (Jim Breech kick)	Bengals 28–20
4	CIN	Rodney Holman 5 yard pass from Boomer Esiason (Jim Breech kick)	Bengals 35–20
4	NYG	Jess Atkinson 46 yard field goal	Bengals 35–23
4	NYG	George Adams 24 yard pass from Phil Simms (Jess Atkinson kick)	Bengals 35–30

==== Week 8 ====
Pittsburgh Steelers at Cincinnati Bengals

Quarter	1	2	3	4	Total
Steelers	0	7	0	14	**21**
**Bengals**	3	14	9	0	**26**

at Riverfront Stadium, Cincinnati

- Date: October 27, 1985
- Game time: 4:00 pm EST
- Game weather: 59 °F (15 °C), wind 4 miles per hour (6.4 km/h; 3.5 kn)
- Game attendance: 55,241
- Referee: Bob McElwee
- TV announcers (NBC): Don Criqui (play by play), Bob Trumpy (color commentator)

Scoring summary

Quarter	Time	Drive			Team	Scoring information	Score	
Quarter	Time	Plays	Yards	TOP	Team	Scoring information	Steelers	Bengals
1					Bengals	37-yard field goal by Jim Breech	0	3
2					Bengals	Rodney Holman 11-yard touchdown reception from Boomer Esiason, Jim Breech kick good	0	10
2					Bengals	Interception returned 57 yards for touchdown by Robert Jackson, Jim Breech kick good	0	17
2					Steelers	Louis Lipps 49-yard touchdown reception from David Woodley, Gary Anderson kick good	7	17
3					Bengals	39-yard field goal by Jim Breech	7	20
3					Bengals	40-yard field goal by Jim Breech	7	23
3					Bengals	32-yard field goal by Jim Breech	7	26
4					Steelers	Louis Lipps 62-yard punt return for touchdown	14	26
4					Steelers	Walter Abercrombie 1-yard touchdown run, Gary Anderson kick good	21	26
"TOP" = time of possession. For other American football terms, see Glossary of American football.							21	26

=== Standings ===
AFC Central
	W	L	T	PCT	DIV	CONF	PF	PA	STK
^{(3)} Cleveland Browns	8	8	0	.500	4–2	7–5	287	294	L1
Cincinnati Bengals	7	9	0	.438	4–2	5–7	441	437	L2
Pittsburgh Steelers	7	9	0	.438	3–3	6–6	379	355	L1
Houston Oilers	5	11	0	.313	1–5	4–8	284	412	L4

== Team leaders ==
=== Passing ===
Player	Att	Comp	Yds	TD	INT	Rating
Boomer Esiason	431	251	3443	27	12	92.3

=== Rushing ===
Player	Att	Yds	YPC	Long	TD
James Brooks	192	929	4.8	39	7
Larry Kinnebrew	170	714	4.2	29	9

=== Receiving ===
Player	Rec	Yds	Avg	Long	TD
Cris Collinsworth	65	1125	17.3	71	5
James Brooks	55	576	10.3	57	5
Eddie Brown	53	942	17.8	68	8

=== Defensive ===
Player	Tackles	Sacks	INTs	FF	FR
Tim Krumrie	96	3.5	0	1	2
Ross Browner	63	9	0	0	2
James Griffin	55	1	7	2	1

=== Kicking and punting ===
Player	FGA	FGM	FG%	XPA	XPM	XP%	Points
Jim Breech	33	24	72.7%	50	48	96.0	120

Player	Punts	Yards	Long	Blkd	Avg.
Pat McInally	57	2410	64	1	42.3

=== Special teams ===
Player	KR	KRYards	KRAvg	KRLong	KRTD	PR	PRYards	PRAvg	PRLong	PRTD
Mike Martin	48	1104	23.0	45	0	32	268	8.4	26	0

== Awards and honors ==
- Anthony Muñoz, AFC Pro Bowl selection
