= Mike Renfro =

American football player (born 1955)

No. 82
- Position: Wide receiver

Personal information
- Born: June 19, 1955 (age 71); Fort Worth, Texas, U.S.
- Listed height: 6 ft 0 in (1.83 m)
- Listed weight: 184 lb (83 kg)

Career information
- High school: Arlington Heights (Fort Worth)
- College: TCU
- NFL draft: 1978: 4th round, 98th overall pick

Career history
- Houston Oilers (1978–1983); Dallas Cowboys (1984–1988)

Awards and highlights
- Third-team All-American (1977); 3× First-team All-SWC (1975, 1976, 1977); Texas Sports Hall of Fame

Career NFL statistics
- Receptions: 323
- Receiving yards: 4,708
- Receiving touchdowns: 28
- Stats at Pro Football Reference

Michael Ray Renfro (born June 19, 1955) is an American former professional football player who was a wide receiver in the National Football League (NFL) for the Houston Oilers and Dallas Cowboys. He played college football for the TCU Horned Frogs.

== Early life ==
Renfro attended Arlington Heights High School, where he was a multi-sport athlete. He was a wide receiver in football.

Renfro accepted a football scholarship from Texas Christian University. He was named a starter as a freshman and was second on the team with 21 receptions for 362 yards (17.2-yard avg.) and two touchdowns.

As a sophomore, Renfro's production jumped to 49 receptions for 810 yards (16.5-yard avg.) and two touchdowns. As a junior, he led the team with 42 receptions for 773 yards (18.4-yard avg.) and three touchdowns.

Renfro's best season came as a senior, posting 50 receptions for 794 yards, including a school and a Southwest Conference single-season record with 10 receiving touchdowns.

Renfro graduated from college as the all-time leading pass receiver in school and Southwest Conference history with 2,739 receiving yards. He also left as the school's career leader in receptions (162) and receiving touchdowns (17). Renfro played for the Horned Frogs during a low point in TCU football history, which cost him the opportunity to earn more accolades for his play, never experiencing a winning season and winning only four games in four seasons.

Renfro was inducted into the Texas Christian University Athletics Hall of Fame in 1988, and into the Southwest Conference Hall of Fame in 2016.

== Professional career ==
=== Houston Oilers ===
Renfro was selected by the Houston Oilers in the fourth round (98th overall) of the 1978 NFL draft. As a rookie, he started 10 out of 14 games, registering 26 receptions (third on the team) for 339 yards (third on the team) and two touchdowns.

In 1979, he started two out of 15 games, collecting 16 receptions (tied for fifth on the team) for 323 yards (third on the team), a 20.2-yard average (led the team) and two touchdowns. In the playoffs, he was involved in one of the most controversial plays in NFL history. Down 17–10 late in the third quarter of the AFC Championship game against the Pittsburgh Steelers, a Dan Pastorini pass to Renfro for an apparent tying touchdown was ruled not a catch, possibly costing the Oilers a chance for victory and a trip to the Super Bowl. The play was cited as the impetus for league-wide instant replay in the NFL, which was instituted in 1986.

In 1980, Renfro started 16 games, tallying 35 receptions (second on the team) for 459 yards (third on the team) and one touchdown. In 1981, he had his best year with the Oilers, starting 12 games, while making 39 receptions (second on the team) for 451 yards (second on the team) and one touchdown.

In 1982, the season was reduced from a 16-game schedule to nine contests because of the players' strike that year. Renfro started four out of nine games, posting 21 receptions (third on the team) for 295 yards (third on the team) and three touchdowns.

In 1983, Renfro did not play until the fifth regular season game while he was recovering from hepatitis and was eventually placed on the injured reserve list with a left knee injury on November 28. He finished with 23 receptions (third on the team) for 316 yards (tied for second on the team) and 2 touchdowns.

On April 13, 1984, Renfro was traded to the Dallas Cowboys along with a 1984 second-round pick (#54: Bo Eason) and a fifth-rounder in the 1985 NFL draft (#114: Herschel Walker), in exchange for wide receiver Butch Johnson and a 1984 second-round pick (#40: Victor Scott).

Although Renfro proved his worth as the team's possession receiver in the Oilers' run-oriented offenses of the Earl Campbell era, he never had the opportunities to achieve high receiving numbers, even when catching balls from quarterback greats Dan Pastorini, Kenny Stabler and Archie Manning.

=== Dallas Cowboys ===
In 1984, Renfro was acquired by the Dallas Cowboys after starter Drew Pearson suffered a career-ending car accident. At the time, he posted his best statistical season with 35 receptions (fifth on the team) for 583 yards (third on the team), a 16.7-yard average and 2 touchdowns. Renfro also completed a 49-yard touchdown pass to Doug Donley in a 23–17 win against the Philadelphia Eagles.

Renfro was named the team's most valuable player for the 1985 season, after having a career year with 60 receptions (third on the team) for 955 yards (second on the team) and eight touchdowns (led the team). In the fifth game, a 30–29 win against the New York Giants, he had a season-high 10 receptions for 141 yards and two touchdowns, which would also become the first 100-yard receiving contest in his career. In the NFC Eastern Division title-clinching win against the Giants later in the year, he caught four receptions for 123 yards and two touchdowns, including a 58-yard catch.

In 1986, Renfro was limited with a shoulder injury suffered in the first preseason game against the Chicago Bears and spent the first four weeks of the season on the injured reserve list. He started six out of 12 games, making 22 receptions for 325 yards and three touchdowns. Renfro regained his form in the last four games, averaging 18.8 yards per reception and catching a touchdown pass in each of the last two.

After the players went on strike on the third week of the 1987 season, those contests were canceled (reducing the 16-game season to 15) and the NFL decided that the games going forward would be done using replacement players. Renfro was one of the first Cowboys to cross the picket line. He appeared in two games during the replacement games as a backup to Cornell Burbage, only registering five receptions for 79 yards against the Washington Redskins. In the eighth game, against the New England Patriots, on a fourth-and-13 situation with 1:06 minutes remaining, he had a 43-yard catch to set up the tying field goal in a 23–17 overtime win. On Thanksgiving Day, against the Minnesota Vikings, he had seven receptions for 100 yards and three second-half touchdowns, in a game the Cowboys lost 44–38 in overtime. Renfro finished the year second on the team with 46 receptions for 662 yards and four receiving touchdowns (which led the team).

On September 24, 1988, Renfro was released after being replaced with rookie first-round draft choice Michael Irvin. He retired having played 10 seasons in the league, recording 323 receptions for 4,708 yards and 28 touchdowns.

== NFL career statistics ==
Legend
**Bold**	Career high

=== Regular season ===
Year	Team	Games		Receiving				
Year	Team	GP	GS	Rec	Yds	Avg	Lng	TD
1978	HOU	14	10	26	339	13.0	58	2
1979	HOU	15	1	16	323	**20.2**	49	2
1980	HOU	**16**	**16**	35	459	13.1	42	1
1981	HOU	12	12	39	451	11.6	43	1
1982	HOU	9	4	21	295	14.0	54	3
1983	HOU	9	7	23	316	13.7	38	2
1984	DAL	**16**	11	35	583	16.7	**60**	2
1985	DAL	**16**	**16**	**60**	**955**	15.9	58	**8**
1986	DAL	12	6	22	325	14.8	30	3
1987	DAL	14	11	46	662	14.4	43	4
		133	94	323	4,708	14.6	60	28

=== Playoffs ===
Year	Team	Games		Receiving				
Year	Team	GP	GS	Rec	Yds	Avg	Lng	TD
1979	HOU	**3**	**1**	**4**	**99**	**24.8**	**47**	**1**
1980	HOU	1	**1**	3	69	23.0	39	0
1985	DAL	1	**1**	0	0	0.0	0	0
		5	3	7	168	24.0	47	1

== Renfro's football family lineage ==
His father, Ray Renfro, was a four-time world champion All-Pro wide receiver for the Cleveland Browns from 1952 to 1964, and was once considered the fastest man in football. Ray and Mike are arguably the greatest father-son combination of wide receivers in NFL history, combining for 604 receptions, 10,216 yards, and 78 touchdowns. Ray later went on to coach for the Washington Redskins and the Dallas Cowboys. He was the quarterbacks and receivers coach during Dallas's first Super Bowl win in 1972. Mike was the water boy for the Cowboys that season and wears his father's Super Bowl ring today.

His uncle, Dean Renfro, played receiver for the Baltimore Colts and was also the wide receivers coach at TCU during Mike's playing days for the Horned Frogs. Mike's two brothers played wide receiver in college. His two sons (Clint and Ford), nephew and cousin also played receiver at the collegiate level.

His son, Clint, was arguably the best high school recruit in the class that TCU signed in 2006. However, he was unable to participate in football due to multiple injuries. He did compete in track & field for two years. He was a conference champion and the school record holder in the 400 metres hurdles. He attended Carroll Senior High School, where he helped lead the team to state championships as a wide receiver in 2004 and 2005. He was an All-State selection as a wide receiver in 2004. Clint was also the 5A state champion in 300 metres hurdles as a senior and runner-up as a sophomore and junior. He had the second-fastest 300 metres hurdles time in the country in 2006 (36.25).

== Personal life ==
Renfro served as the ballboy for the Dallas Cowboys, during the time his father worked on the team's coaching staff from 1968 to 1972.
