= 1985 NFL season =

American football season

Regular season
- Duration: September 8 – December 23, 1985

Playoffs
- Start date: December 28, 1985
- AFC Champions: New England Patriots
- NFC Champions: Chicago Bears

Super Bowl XX
- Date: January 26, 1986
- Site: Louisiana Superdome, New Orleans, Louisiana
- Champions: Chicago Bears

Pro Bowl
- Date: February 2, 1986
- Site: Aloha Stadium

AFC teams: West, Central, East
NFC teams: West, Central, East

The 1985 NFL season was the 66th regular season of the National Football League. The season ended with Super Bowl XX when the Chicago Bears defeated the New England Patriots 46–10 at the Louisiana Superdome, in New Orleans (New Orleans Saints' stadium). The Bears became the second team in NFL history (after the previous season's San Francisco 49ers) to win 15 games in the regular season and 18 including the playoffs.

== Player movement ==
=== Retirements ===
- August 30, 1985: Four-time Super Bowl champion Franco Harris announces his retirement.

=== Draft ===
The 1985 NFL draft was held from April 30 to May 1, 1985, at New York City's Omni Park Central Hotel. With the first pick, the Buffalo Bills selected defensive end Bruce Smith from Virginia Tech.

== Major rule changes ==
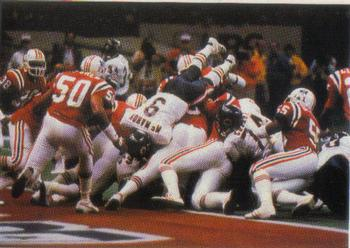
The Bears making a rushing play in the end zone against the Patriots during Super Bowl XX.

- Whenever a team time out is called after the two-minute warning of each half or overtime, it should only last a minute instead of 90 seconds.
- A play is immediately dead anytime the quarterback performs a kneel-down (the quarterback immediately kneels down after receiving the snap) after the two-minute warning of each half, or whenever the player declares himself down by sliding feet first on the ground. The ball is then spotted at the point where the player touches the ground first.
- Pass interference is not to be called when a pass is clearly uncatchable.
- Both "roughing the kicker" and "running into the kicker" fouls are not to be called if the defensive player was blocked into the kicker.
- The definition of a valid fair catch signal is clearly defined as one arm that is fully extended above the head and waved from side to side.
- Goaltending (leaping up to deflect a kick as it passes through the goal posts) is illegal.
- The officials' uniform changed slightly. Instead of wearing black stirrups with two white stripes over white sanitary hose, the officials began wearing a one-piece sock similar to those worn by players, black with two white stripes on top and solid white on the bottom. These were first worn the previous season in Super Bowl XIX.
- Defensive backs were ruled to have an "equal right to the ball", meaning that pass interference would not be called if the defensive player was looking back attempting to intercept the ball, and that any contact with the receiver did not seriously or materially affect the receiver's ability to catch the ball.

== 1985 deaths ==
- Denver Broncos tight ends coach Fran Polsfoot died on April 5, 1985, after suffering from brain cancer.
- Green Bay Packers running back Johnny Blood, a member of the Pro Football Hall of Fame, died at the age of 82 from complications for a stroke.

== Regular season ==
=== Scheduling formula ===
Inter-conference
AFC East vs NFC Central
AFC Central vs NFC East
AFC West vs NFC West

Highlights of the 1985 season included:

- Thanksgiving: Two games were played on Thursday, November 28, featuring the New York Jets at Detroit and the St. Louis Cardinals at Dallas, with Detroit and Dallas winning.

=== Final standings ===
AFC East
	W	L	T	PCT	DIV	CONF	PF	PA	STK
^{(2)} Miami Dolphins	12	4	0	.750	6–2	9–3	428	320	W7
^{(4)} New York Jets	11	5	0	.688	6–2	9–3	393	264	W1
^{(5)} New England Patriots	11	5	0	.688	6–2	8–4	362	290	W1
Indianapolis Colts	5	11	0	.313	1–7	2–10	320	386	W2
Buffalo Bills	2	14	0	.125	1–7	2–12	200	381	L6

AFC Central
	W	L	T	PCT	DIV	CONF	PF	PA	STK
^{(3)} Cleveland Browns	8	8	0	.500	4–2	7–5	287	294	L1
Cincinnati Bengals	7	9	0	.438	4–2	5–7	441	437	L2
Pittsburgh Steelers	7	9	0	.438	3–3	6–6	379	355	L1
Houston Oilers	5	11	0	.313	1–5	4–8	284	412	L4

AFC West
	W	L	T	PCT	DIV	CONF	PF	PA	STK
^{(1)} Los Angeles Raiders	12	4	0	.750	5–3	9–3	354	308	W6
Denver Broncos	11	5	0	.688	5–3	8–4	380	329	W2
Seattle Seahawks	8	8	0	.500	4–4	6–6	349	303	L2
San Diego Chargers	8	8	0	.500	3–5	7–7	467	435	L1
Kansas City Chiefs	6	10	0	.375	3–5	4–8	317	360	W1

NFC East
	W	L	T	PCT	DIV	CONF	PF	PA	STK
^{(3)} Dallas Cowboys	10	6	0	.625	6–2	7–5	357	333	L1
^{(4)} New York Giants	10	6	0	.625	5–3	8–4	399	283	W1
Washington Redskins	10	6	0	.625	4–4	6–6	297	312	W3
Philadelphia Eagles	7	9	0	.438	4–4	6–8	286	310	W1
St. Louis Cardinals	5	11	0	.313	1–7	3–9	278	414	L2

NFC Central
	W	L	T	PCT	DIV	CONF	PF	PA	STK
^{(1)} Chicago Bears	15	1	0	.938	8–0	12–0	456	198	W3
Green Bay Packers	8	8	0	.500	6–2	8–4	337	355	W2
Minnesota Vikings	7	9	0	.438	3–5	5–9	346	359	L2
Detroit Lions	7	9	0	.438	2–6	5–7	307	366	L3
Tampa Bay Buccaneers	2	14	0	.125	1–7	2–10	294	448	L4

NFC West
	W	L	T	PCT	DIV	CONF	PF	PA	STK
^{(2)} Los Angeles Rams	11	5	0	.688	3–3	8–4	340	277	L1
^{(5)} San Francisco 49ers	10	6	0	.625	4–2	7–5	411	263	W2
New Orleans Saints	5	11	0	.313	2–4	5–7	294	401	L3
Atlanta Falcons	4	12	0	.250	3–3	4–8	282	452	W2

=== Tiebreakers ===
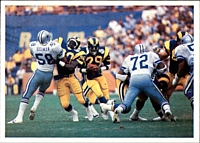
Rams' running back Dickerson (29) rushing the ball through the Cowboys' defense in the 1985-86 NFC Divisional Playoffs Game .

- Los Angeles Raiders were the first AFC seed ahead of Miami based on better record against common opponents (5–1 to Dolphins' 4–2).
- N.Y. Jets were the first AFC Wild Card based on better conference record (9–3) than New England (8–4) and Denver (8–4).
- New England was the second AFC Wild Card ahead of Denver based on better record against common opponents (4–2 to Broncos' 3–3).
- Cincinnati finished ahead of Pittsburgh in the AFC Central based on head-to-head sweep (2–0).
- Seattle finished ahead of San Diego in the AFC West based on head-to-head sweep (2–0).
- Dallas finished ahead of N.Y. Giants and Washington in the NFC East based on better head-to-head record (4–0 to Giants' 1–3 and Redskins' 1–3).
- N.Y. Giants were the first NFC Wild Card based on better conference record (8–4) than San Francisco (7–5) and Washington (6–6).
- San Francisco was the second NFC Wild Card based on head-to-head victory over Washington (1–0).
- Minnesota finished ahead of Detroit in the NFC Central based on better division record (3–5 to Lions' 2–6).

== Playoffs ==
Jan 4 – Anaheim Stadium
3	Dallas	0
Dec 29 – Giants Stadium	Jan 12 – Soldier Field
2	LA Rams	20
NFC
5	San Francisco	3	2	LA Rams	0
Jan 5 – Soldier Field
4	NY Giants	17	1	Chicago	24
NFC Championship
4	NY Giants	0
Jan 26 – Louisiana Superdome
1	Chicago	21
Divisional round
Wild-card round	N1	Chicago	46
Jan 5 – Los Angeles Memorial Coliseum
A5	New England	10
Super Bowl XX
5	New England	27
Dec 28 – Giants Stadium	Jan 12 – Miami Orange Bowl
1	LA Raiders	20
AFC
5	New England	26	5	New England	31
Jan 4 – Miami Orange Bowl
4	NY Jets	14	2	Miami	14
AFC Championship
3	Cleveland	21
2	Miami	24

== Milestones ==
The following players set all-time records during the season:

Most kick return yards, season	Buster Rhymes, Minnesota (1,345)
Most punt return yards, season	Fulton Walker, Miami / Los Angeles Raiders (692)

== Statistical leaders ==
=== Team ===
Points scored	San Diego Chargers (467)
Total yards gained	San Diego Chargers (6,535)
Yards rushing	Chicago Bears (2,761)
Yards passing	San Diego Chargers (4,870)
Fewest points allowed	Chicago Bears (198)
Fewest total yards allowed	Chicago Bears (4,315)
Fewest rushing yards allowed	Chicago Bears (1,319)
Fewest passing yards allowed	Washington Redskins (2,746)

=== Individual ===
Scoring	Kevin Butler, Chicago Bears (151 points)
Touchdowns	Joe Morris, New York Giants (21 TDs)
Most field goals made	Gary Anderson, Pittsburgh Steelers (33 FGs)
Rushing attempts	Gerald Riggs, Atlanta Falcons (397)
Rushing yards	Marcus Allen, Los Angeles Raiders (1,759 yards)
Rushing touchdowns	Joe Morris, New York Giants (21 TDs)
Passes completed	Dan Marino, Miami Dolphins (336)
Pass attempts	John Elway, Denver Broncos (605)
Passing yards	Dan Marino, Miami Dolphins (4,137 yards)
Passer rating	Ken O'Brien, New York Jets (96.2 rating)
Passing touchdowns	Dan Marino, Miami Dolphins (30 TDs)
Pass receiving	Roger Craig, San Francisco 49ers (92 catches)
Pass receiving yards	Steve Largent, Seattle Seahawks (1,287 yards)
Receiving touchdowns	Daryl Turner, Seattle Seahawks (13 TDs)
Punt returns	Irving Fryar, New England Patriots (14.1 average yards)
Kickoff returns	Ron Brown, Los Angeles Rams (32.8 average yards)
Interceptions	Everson Walls, Dallas Cowboys (9)
Punting	Rohn Stark, Indianapolis Colts (45.9 average yards)
Sacks	Richard Dent, Chicago Bears (19.0)

== Awards ==
Most Valuable Player	Marcus Allen, running back, LA Raiders
Coach of the Year	Mike Ditka, Chicago
Offensive Player of the Year	Marcus Allen, running back, LA Raiders
Defensive Player of the Year	Mike Singletary, linebacker, Chicago
Offensive Rookie of the Year	Eddie Brown, wide receiver, Cincinnati
Defensive Rookie of the Year	Duane Bickett, linebacker, Indianapolis
Man of the Year	Dwight Stephenson, center, Miami
Super Bowl Most Valuable Player	Richard Dent, defensive end, Chicago

== Coaching changes ==
=== Offseason ===
- Cleveland Browns: Marty Schottenheimer began his first full season as head coach of the Browns. He replaced Sam Rutigliano, who was fired after starting the 1984 season 1–7.
- Detroit Lions: Monte Clark was fired and replaced by Darryl Rogers.
- Indianapolis Colts: Rod Dowhower was named as head coach. Frank Kush resigned after the team went 4–11 to start the 1984 season. Offensive line coach Hal Hunter served as interim for the team's final 1984 game.
- Minnesota Vikings: Les Steckel was fired. Bud Grant came out of retirement for a second stint with the Vikings.
- New England Patriots: Raymond Berry began his first full season as head coach. He replaced Ron Meyer, who was fired after eight games into the 1984 season.
- Tampa Bay Buccaneers: John McKay retired and was replaced by Leeman Bennett.

=== In-season ===
- Buffalo Bills: Kay Stephenson was fired after going 0–4 to start the season. Defensive coordinator Hank Bullough was named as interim.
- Houston Oilers: Hugh Campbell was fired after 14 games. Defensive coordinator Jerry Glanville took over for the final two games, then was given the job permanently for 1986.
- New Orleans Saints: Bum Phillips resigned after 12 games. Wade Phillips, his son and the team's defensive coordinator, served as interim for the last four games.
- Philadelphia Eagles: Marion Campbell was fired before the final game of the season. Fred Bruney as interim for that last game.

== Uniform changes ==
- Due to their unpopularity, the Cleveland Browns removed the three-stripe sleeve pattern and number outlines that they introduced in 1984. They returned to their five-stripe sleeve pattern brown and white jerseys, and white pants combination used prior to 1975. The face masks remained white.
- The Minnesota Vikings switched from white to purple face masks.
- The Philadelphia Eagles replace the sleeve stripes with their "eagle in flight" logo, and changed the shade of Kelly green on their uniforms to the lighter, more saturated shade that they had last worn in 1973.
- The San Diego Chargers switched from dark royal blue to navy blue jerseys, and from gold to white pants.

== Television ==
This was the fourth year under the league's five-year broadcast contracts with ABC, CBS, and NBC to televise Monday Night Football, the NFC package, and the AFC package, respectively. Joe Namath replaced Don Meredith in the MNF booth, joining Frank Gifford and O. J. Simpson.
