= Arizona Cardinals =

NFL team in Glendale, Arizona, U.S.

- Current season
Logo	Wordmark
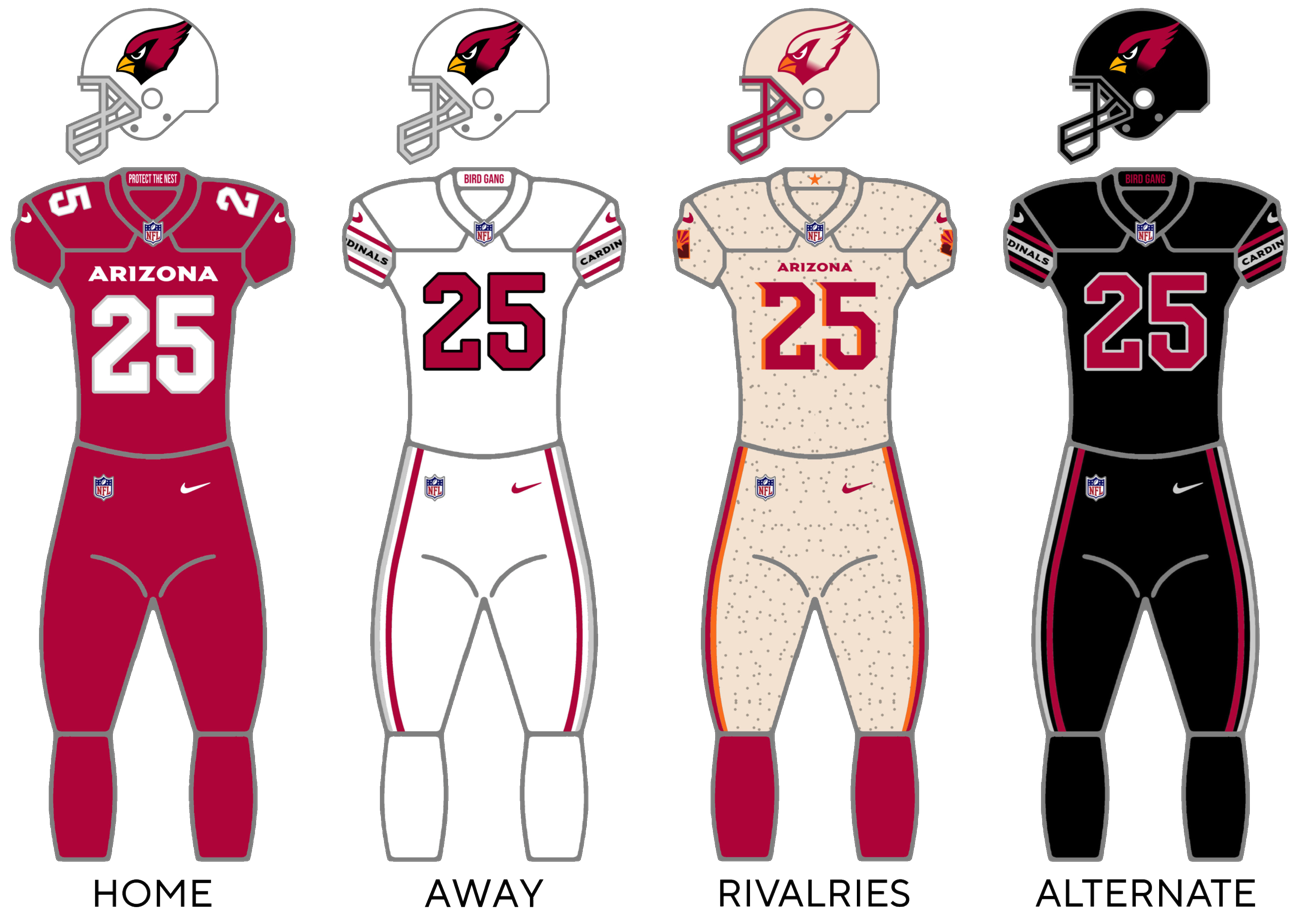
- Uniforms

General information
- Founded: 1898; 128 years ago
- Stadium: State Farm Stadium; Glendale, Arizona
- Headquartered: Tempe, Arizona
- Colors: Cardinal red, white, black, grey
- Mascot: Big Red
- Website: azcardinals.com

Personnel
- Owner: Michael Bidwill
- General manager: Monti Ossenfort
- Head coach: Mike LaFleur

Nicknames
- The Cards; The Redbirds; The Big Red; The Football Cardinals (during St. Louis tenure, 1960–1987); The Gridbirds; Birdgang/Red Sea (fanbase)

Team history
- Morgan Athletic Club (1898); Racine Normals (1899–1900); Racine (Street) Cardinals (1901–1905, 1913–1917, 1919–1921); Suspended operations (1906–1912, 1918); Chicago Cardinals (1922–1943, 1945–1959); Card-Pitt (1944); St. Louis Cardinals (1960–1987); Phoenix Cardinals (1988–1993); Arizona Cardinals (1994–present)

Home fields
- Normal Park (1920–1921, 1926–1928); Comiskey Park (1922–1925, 1929–1930, 1939–1959); Wrigley Field (1931–1938); Busch Stadium (1960–1965); Busch Memorial Stadium (1966–1987); Sun Devil Stadium (1988–2005); State Farm Stadium (2006–present); Temporary stadiums 1944 due to shortage of players during World War II (temporary merger with Pittsburgh Steelers): Forbes Field (three games); 1959 before relocation to St. Louis: Soldier Field (four games); Metropolitan Stadium (two games)

League / conference affiliations
- Independent (1898–1906, 1913–1919) National Football League (1920–present): Western Division (1933–1949); American Conference (1950–1952); Eastern Conference (1953–1969); Century Division (1967–1969); National Football Conference (1970–present); NFC East (1970–2001); NFC West (2002–present)

Championships
- League championships: 2: NFL championships (pre-1970 AFL–NFL merger) (2) 1925, 1947
- Conference championships: 1: NFC: 2008
- Division championships: 7: NFL Western: 1947, 1948; NFC East: 1974, 1975; NFC West: 2008, 2009, 2015

Playoff appearances (11)
- NFL: 1947, 1948, 1974, 1975, 1982, 1998, 2008, 2009, 2014, 2015, 2021

Owners
- Chris O'Brien (1898–1929); David Jones (1929–1933); Charles Bidwill (1933–1947); Violet Bidwill Wolfner (1947–1962); Charles Bidwill Jr. and Bill Bidwill (1962–1972); Bill Bidwill (1972–2019); Michael Bidwill (2019–present)

The Arizona Cardinals are a professional American football team based in the Phoenix metropolitan area. The Cardinals compete in the National Football League (NFL) as a member of the National Football Conference (NFC) West division. The team plays its home games at State Farm Stadium in Glendale, a suburb northwest of the state capital of Phoenix.

The team was established in Chicago in 1898 as the Morgan Athletic Club, and joined the NFL as a charter member on September 17, 1920. The Cardinals are the oldest continuously run professional football franchise in the United States, and, along with the Chicago Bears, are the only NFL charter member franchises still in operation. (Note: The Green Bay Packers were an independent team and did not join the NFL until a year after its creation in 1921.)

In 1960, the team moved to St. Louis, where it was commonly referred to as the "Football Cardinals", the "Gridbirds", or the "Big Red" to avoid confusion with Major League Baseball's (MLB) St. Louis Cardinals.

Before the 1988 season, the team moved to Tempe, Arizona, a suburb of Phoenix, where it played home games for the next 18 seasons at Sun Devil Stadium on the campus of Arizona State University. In 2006, the team moved to their current home field in suburban Glendale. Their executive offices and training facility remain in Tempe, although they are moving them to north Phoenix in 2028. From 1988 to 2012 (except 2005, when they trained in Prescott), the Cardinals conducted their annual summer training camp at Northern Arizona University in Flagstaff. In 2013, the Cardinals moved their training camp to their home field, then called University of Phoenix Stadium, now State Farm Stadium.

The Cardinals have won two NFL championships, both while the team was in Chicago. The first, in 1925, was disputed by supporters of the Pottsville Maroons. Their second, and the first to be won in a championship game, came in 1947, nearly two decades before the first Super Bowl. They returned to the title game to defend in 1948, but lost the rematch 7–0 in a snowstorm in Philadelphia.

The team has since suffered many losing seasons and, as of 2025, has the longest active championship drought in North American sports at 78 seasons. The next longest drought is MLB's Cleveland Guardians, who last won the World Series in 1948; 1 year after the Cardinals won their last championship.

The team's all-time win–loss record (including regular season and playoff games) at the conclusion of the 2025 season was 603–836–41 (596–826–41 in the regular season, 7–10 in the playoffs). They have been to the playoffs 11 times and have won seven playoff games, including three in the 2008–09 NFL playoffs. During that season, they won their only NFC Championship Game since the 1970 AFL–NFL merger, and reached Super Bowl XLIII, losing 27–23 to the Pittsburgh Steelers.

The team has won five division titles (1974, 1975, 2008, 2009, and 2015) since their 1947–48 NFL championship game appearances. The Cardinals are the only NFL team that has never lost a playoff game at home: their 5–0 record encompasses the 1947 NFL Championship Game, two games during the 2008–09 NFL playoffs, one during the 2009–10 playoffs, and one during the 2015–16 playoffs.

In their 37 seasons since moving to Arizona in 1988, the Cardinals have a total of six playoff appearances, three division titles, and one NFC championship.

== History ==
=== Chicago Cardinals (1920–1959) ===
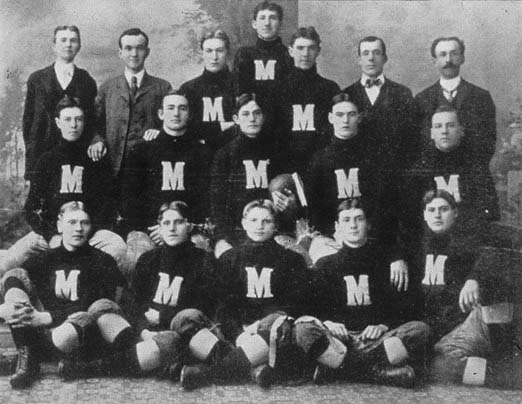
The Morgan Athletic Club (pictured c. 1900), predecessor to the Arizona Cardinals

The franchise dates to 1898, when a neighborhood group gathered to play on the South Side of Chicago, calling themselves the Morgan Athletic Club. Chicago painting and building contractor Chris O'Brien acquired the team, which he moved to Normal Field on Racine Avenue. The team was known as the Racine Normals until 1901, when O'Brien bought used jerseys from the University of Chicago. After he described the faded maroon clothing as "Cardinal red", the team became the Racine Street Cardinals. Eventually in 1920, the team became a charter member of the American Professional Football Association (APFA), which was rechristened the National Football League (NFL) two years later. The team entered the league as the Racine Cardinals, but changed their name to the Chicago Cardinals in 1922 to avoid confusion with the Horlick-Racine Legion, who entered the league the same year.

==== NFL champions (1925) ====
The Chicago Cardinals playing the Buffalo Bisons at Comiskey Park in 1925

In 1925, the Cardinals were awarded the NFL Championship after the Pottsville Maroons were suspended for playing a game in what was deemed "another team's territory". Having beat the Cardinals in a head-to-head game earlier in the season, the Pottsville Maroons won their extra game against the University of Notre Dame, helping them finish the year with the same record as the Cardinals. The Cardinals were also guilty of breaking NFL rules by scheduling two additional games against the Hammond Pros and the Milwaukee Badgers, both of whom had already disbanded for the season. The game against the Badgers spurred a scandal when the Badgers filled out their roster with four high school players, in violation of NFL rules.

==== NFL Champions (1947) ====
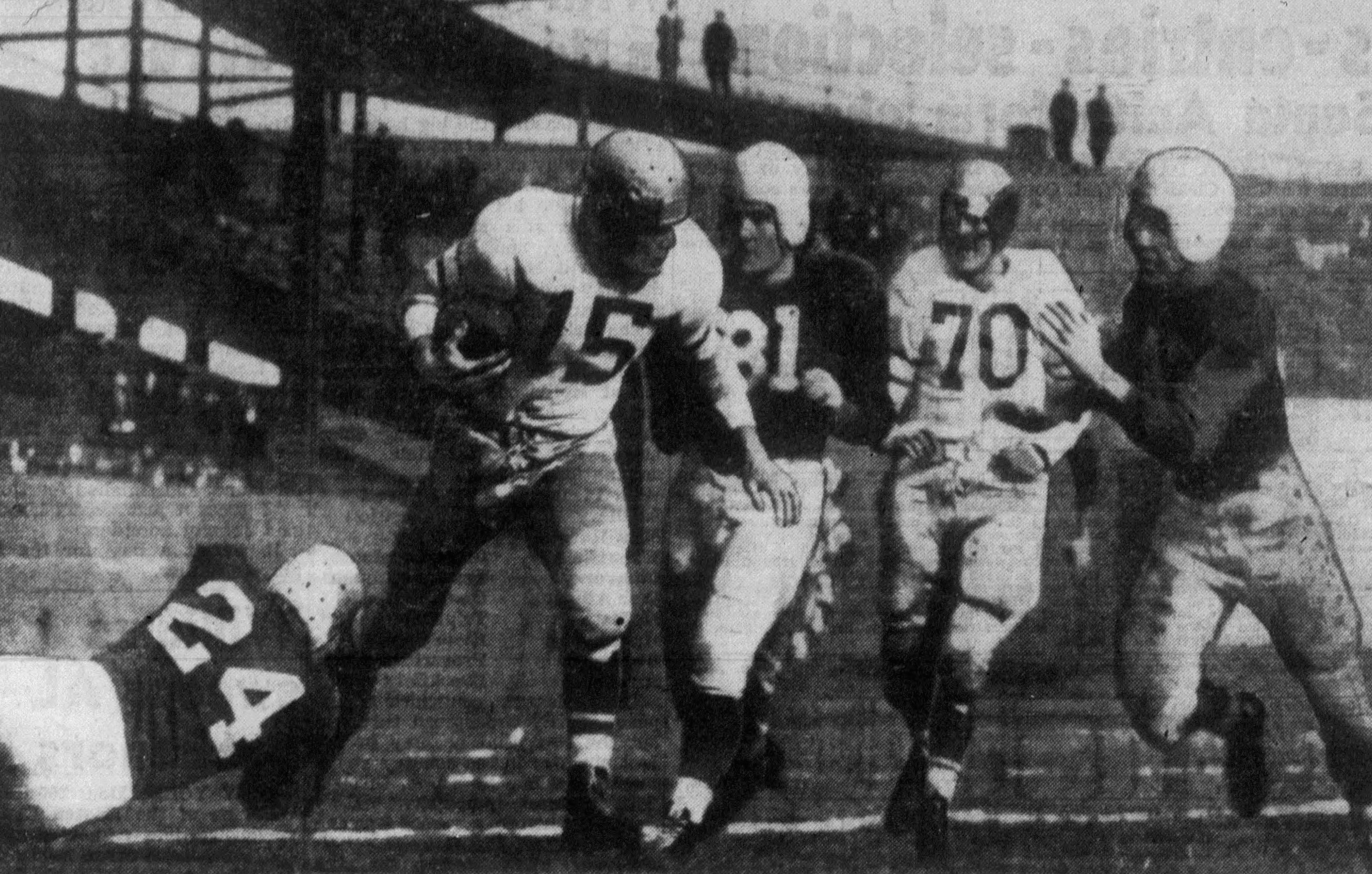
The Chicago Cardinals in 1947

During the post-World War II years, the team reached two straight NFL finals against the Philadelphia Eagles, winning in 1947 (eight months after Charles Bidwill's death) but losing the following year. In the late 1950s, after years of bad seasons and losing fans to their crosstown rivals, the Chicago Bears, the Cardinals were almost bankrupt, and owner Violet Bidwill Wolfner became interested in moving the team to a new city.

=== St. Louis Cardinals (1960–1987) ===
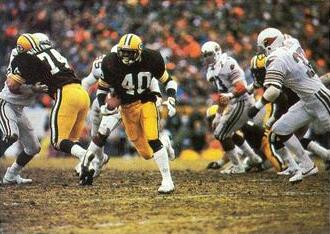
The Cardinals in the 1982 NFC First Round Playoff game

Due to the formation of the rival American Football League, the NFL allowed Bidwill to move the team to St. Louis, Missouri, where they became the St. Louis Cardinals. They were locally called the "Big Red", the "Gridbirds" or the "Football Cardinals" to avoid confusion with the local baseball team of the same name. During the Cardinals' 28-year stay in St. Louis, they advanced to the playoffs just three times (1974, 1975 and 1982), never hosting or winning. They did, however, win the Playoff Bowl, a now-defunct post-season game for third place, in 1964 against the Green Bay Packers by a score of 24–17. The overall mediocrity of the Cardinals, combined with a then-21-year-old stadium, caused game attendance to dwindle, and owner Bill Bidwill decided to move the team to Arizona.

=== Phoenix/Arizona Cardinals (1988–present) ===
Not long after the end of the 1987 NFL season, Bidwill agreed to move to Phoenix on a handshake deal with state and local officials, and the team became the Phoenix Cardinals. The team changed their name to the Arizona Cardinals on March 17, 1994.

The Cardinals hired Vince Tobin as head coach before the 1996 season. In his first season, he led the team to a 7–9 mark in the 1996 season. The team regressed in the 1997 season with a 4–12 record. The 1998 NFL season saw the Cardinals break two long droughts, qualifying for the playoffs for the first time in 16 years. The team got their first postseason win since 1947 by defeating the Dallas Cowboys 20–7 in the wild card round of the playoffs. The Cardinals saw their run end in the Divisional Round with a 41–21 loss to the Minnesota Vikings. The Cardinals regressed to a 6–10 record in the 1999 season. In the 2000 season, Tobin was fired after a 2–5 start. Dave McGinnis finished the season out with a 1–8 record.

Before the 2001 season, the Cardinals named McGinnis as their head coach. He coached for three seasons, regressing each year record-wise. He was fired by the team after the 2003 season.

Before the 2004 season, the Cardinals hired Dennis Green as head coach. He coached the team to three consecutive losing seasons and was fired after the 2006 season.

The Cardinals hired Ken Whisenhunt as head coach before the 2007 season. In his first season with the team, Whisenhunt led the Cardinals to an 8–8 record in the 2007 season. In the 2008 postseason, the Cardinals, led by quarterback Kurt Warner, won the Wild Card Round over the Atlanta Falcons, the Divisional Round against the Carolina Panthers, and the NFC Championship Game against the Philadelphia Eagles to advance to the Super Bowl for the first time in their history. They lost Super Bowl XLIII 27–23 to the Pittsburgh Steelers in the final seconds of the game.

Larry Fitzgerald set a single-postseason record with 546 receiving yards and seven touchdowns during the Cardinals' 2008 run to Super Bowl XLIII

After their historic 2008 season, the Cardinals posted a 10–6 record in 2009, their first season with 10 wins in Arizona. The Cardinals clinched their second consecutive NFC West title but were defeated by eventual Super Bowl champion New Orleans Saints, 45–14 in the divisional playoffs. After the 2012 season, the Cardinals fired Whisenhunt as head coach. Before the 2013 season, the team hired Bruce Arians as head coach. Arians' first season with the team saw the Cardinals go 10–6 but miss the postseason in 2013. The next time they would make the playoffs would be in 2014, as a wild card. They set the best regular season record in their history in Arizona at 11–5 but were defeated by the 7–8–1 NFC South champions, the Carolina Panthers.

The next year, the Cardinals set a franchise-best 13–3 record and clinched a first round bye as the NFC's second seed. They defeated the Green Bay Packers 26–20 in overtime, giving quarterback Carson Palmer his first playoff victory. The Cardinals then advanced to their second NFC Championship Game in their history but were blown out by the top-seeded 15–1 Panthers 49–15, committing seven turnovers.

The Cardinals then fell to 7–8–1 in 2016 and 8–8 in 2017. After the 2017 season, Arians retired as head coach. The Cardinals hired Steve Wilks to be the head coach before the 2018 season. The team dropped to a 3–13 record in 2018, tying the franchise record set in 2000 for the worst record in a 16-game season. Wilks was fired after the season. The Cardinals hired Kliff Kingsbury as head coach before the 2019 season. In the 2019 NFL draft, the Cardinals used the top overall pick in the draft on Oklahoma quarterback Kyler Murray. The team improved to 5–10–1 in 2019 and 8–8 in 2020. In 2021, the Cardinals went 11–6, posting a winning record and returning to the postseason for the first time since 2015, but lost to the Los Angeles Rams in the Wild Card round. They failed to improve their record in 2022, dropping to the bottom of NFC West at 4–13, and missing the playoffs. Kingsbury was fired as head coach after the 2022 season. Under first year head coach Jonathan Gannon, the Cardinals once again finished in fourth in the NFC West with a 4–13 record in 2023. In 2024, they finished with an 8–9 record. In 2025, the Arizona Cardinals set NFL history as the first team to lose three consecutive games by a last second game winning field goal.The Cardinals would finish the season with a 3-14 record, resulting in Gannon being fired on January 5, 2026. Less than a month later, Rams offensive coordinator Mike LaFleur was hired as the team's next head coach.

== Logos and uniforms ==
The team has worn cardinal red jerseys since Chris O'Brien bought them for the club in 1898. For most of their history, the Cardinals have used the same basic uniform design of white helmets, white pants with red stripes on the sides, and either red or white jerseys.

Chicago Cardinals logo, introduced in 1947

Starting in 1947, the team used a logo of a Northern cardinal (Cardinalis cardinalis) perched on the laces of a football in printed materials such as programs or official letterheads. After moving to St. Louis in 1960, the team added a drawing of a cardinal's head to both sides of their helmet. They also changed their print logo to an anthropomorphic cardinal carrying a football in front of the Gateway Arch.

Phoenix Cardinals uniform: 1989–1995

The Cardinals moved to Arizona in 1988, and the flag of Arizona was added to the sleeves the following year. In 1990, the team began wearing red pants with their white jerseys, as new coach Joe Bugel wanted to emulate his former employer, the Washington Redskins, who at the time wore burgundy pants with their white jerseys (the Redskins later returned to their 1970s gold pants with all their jerseys).

In 1994, the Cardinals participated in the NFL's 75th-anniversary throwback uniform program. The jerseys were similar to those of the 1920s Chicago Cardinals, with an interlocking "CC" logo and three stripes on each sleeve. The uniform numbers were moved to the right chest. The pants were khaki to simulate the color and material used in that era. The Cardinals also stripped the logos from their helmets for two games: at Cleveland and home vs. Pittsburgh.

Arizona Cardinals uniform: 1996–2004

The Cardinal head on the helmet also appeared on the sleeve of the white jersey from 1982 to 1995. In 1996, the state flag of Arizona was moved higher on the sleeve after the Cardinal head was eliminated as sleeves on football jerseys became shorter, and black was removed as an accent color, instead replaced with blue to match the predominant color of the state flag. In 2002, the Cardinals began to wear all-red and all-white combinations, and continued to do so through 2004, before the team's makeover.

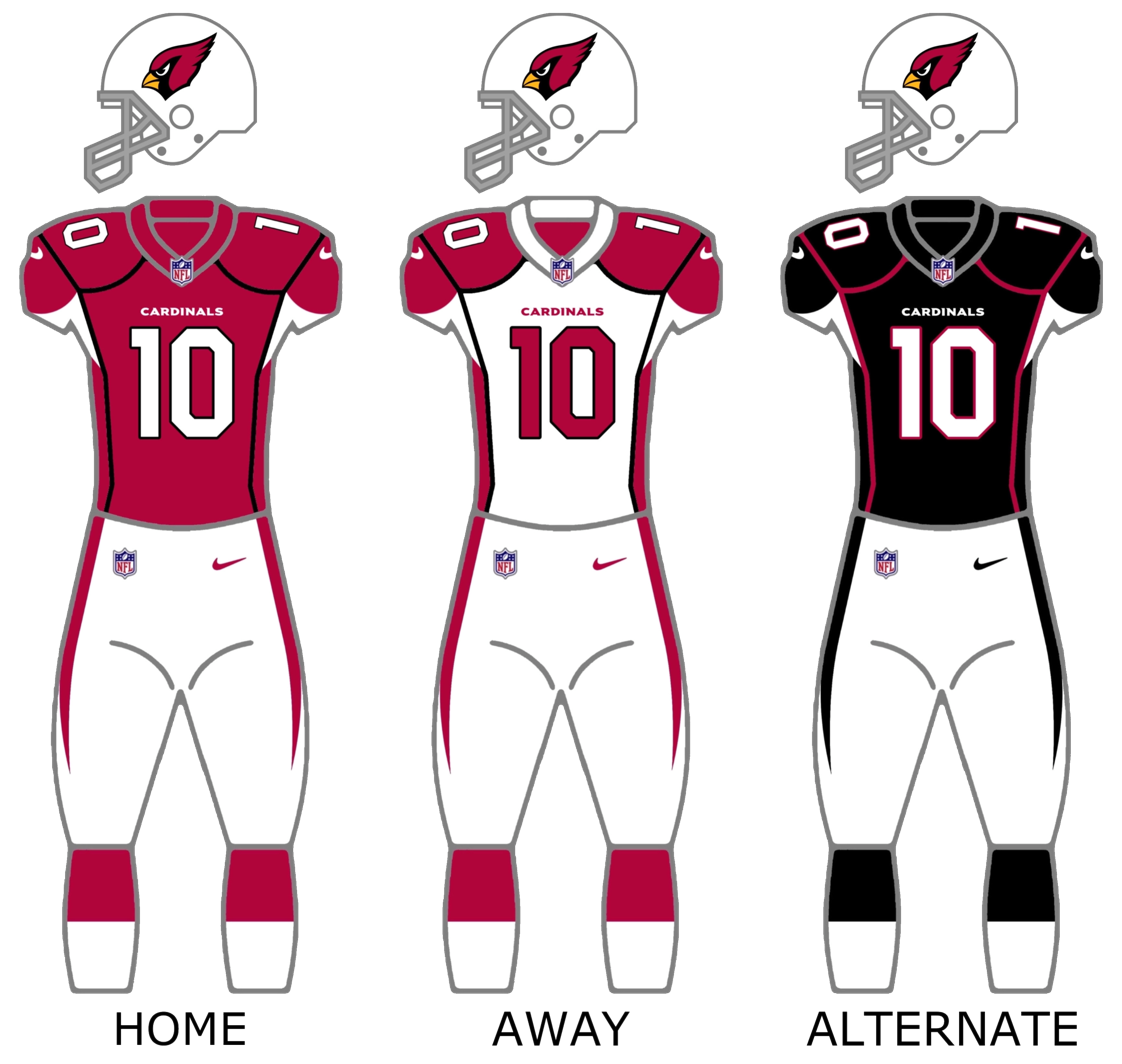
Arizona Cardinals uniform: 2005–2022

In 2005, the team unveiled its first major changes in a century. The cardinal-head logo was updated to look sleeker and meaner than its predecessor. Numerous fans had derisively called the previous version a "parakeet". Black again became an accent color after an eight-year absence, while trim lines were added to the outside shoulders, sleeves, and sides of the jerseys and pants. Both the red and white jerseys have the option of red or white pants.

Hoping to break a six-game losing streak, the Cardinals wore the red pants for the first time on October 29, 2006, in a game at Lambeau Field against the Green Bay Packers. The Packers won 31–14, and the Cards headed into their bye week with a 1–7 mark. After the bye week, the Cardinals came out in an all-red combination at home against the Dallas Cowboys and lost, 27–10. Arizona did not wear the red pants for the remainder of the season and won four of their last seven games. However, the following season, in 2007, the Cardinals again wore their red pants for their final 3 home games. They wore red pants with white jerseys in games on the road at the Cincinnati Bengals and Seattle Seahawks. They paired red pants with red jerseys, the all-red combination, for home games against the Detroit Lions, San Francisco 49ers, Cleveland Browns, and St. Louis Rams. The red pants were not worn at all in 2008, but they were used in home games against Seattle, Minnesota, and St. Louis in 2009. The red pants were paired with the white road jersey for the first time in three years during a 2010 game at Carolina, but the white jersey/red pants combination was not used again until 2018, when they wore the combination against the Kansas City Chiefs.

The Cardinals' first home game in Arizona, in 1988, saw them play in red jerseys. Thereafter, for the next 18 years in Arizona, the Cardinals, like a few other NFL teams in warm climates, wore their white jerseys at home during the first half of the season—forcing opponents to suffer in their darker jerseys during Arizona autumns that frequently see temperatures over 100 °F (38 °C). However, this tradition did not continue when the Cardinals moved from Sun Devil Stadium to State Farm Stadium in 2006, as early-season games (and some home games late in the season) were played with the roof closed. With the temperature inside at a comfortable 70 °F (21 °C), the team opted to wear red jerseys at home full time. The Cardinals wore white jerseys at home for the first time at State Farm Stadium on August 29, 2008, in a preseason game against the Denver Broncos.

The Cardinals wore white at home for the first time in a regular season game at State Farm Stadium against the Houston Texans on October 11, 2009. In October 2009, the NFL recognized Breast Cancer Awareness Month, and players wore pink-accented items, including gloves, wristbands, and shoes. The team thought the pink accents looked better with white uniforms than with red.

From 1970 through 1983, and again in many seasons between 1989 and 2002, the Cardinals would wear white when hosting the Dallas Cowboys in order to force the Cowboys to don their "jinxed" blue jerseys. They have not done this since moving into State Farm Stadium, however.

The 2010 season saw the Cardinals debut a new, alternate black jersey. In 2017, the Cardinals debuted an all-black set for the NFL Color Rush program. While the regular black alternates featured white lettering and are paired with white pants, the Cardinals' Color Rush alternates used red lettering and black pants for the occasion. Starting in 2022, both black uniforms would be paired with an alternate black helmet with black facemasks.

Before the 2023 season, the Cardinals unveiled new uniforms. Most notably, the team opted to wear all-red uniforms at home and all-white uniforms on the road, with all-black uniforms as the alternate. The red uniform featured the state name in front in addition to white numbers with silver trim. The white uniform featured red numbers with black trim, and red and silver stripes along the pants and sleeves. The black alternate uniform design mirrored that of the white uniform, featuring red numbers with silver trim, and red and silver stripes along the pants and sleeves. On both uniforms, the silver sleeve stripe contained the team name. Both the red and white uniforms are worn with white helmets and silver facemasks, while the black uniform is worn with the black helmets from 2022. The new helmets featured silver flakes while the black helmet had red flakes in them.

Ahead of the 2025 season, the team unveiled a "Rivalries" uniform, which they would wear once per season at home against each of their NFC West opponents for three seasons. The primarily tan design featured sand speckles throughout the uniform, along with red numbers and stripes trimmed in copper. The modified cardinal head decal also featured red and white with copper trim.

== Fans ==
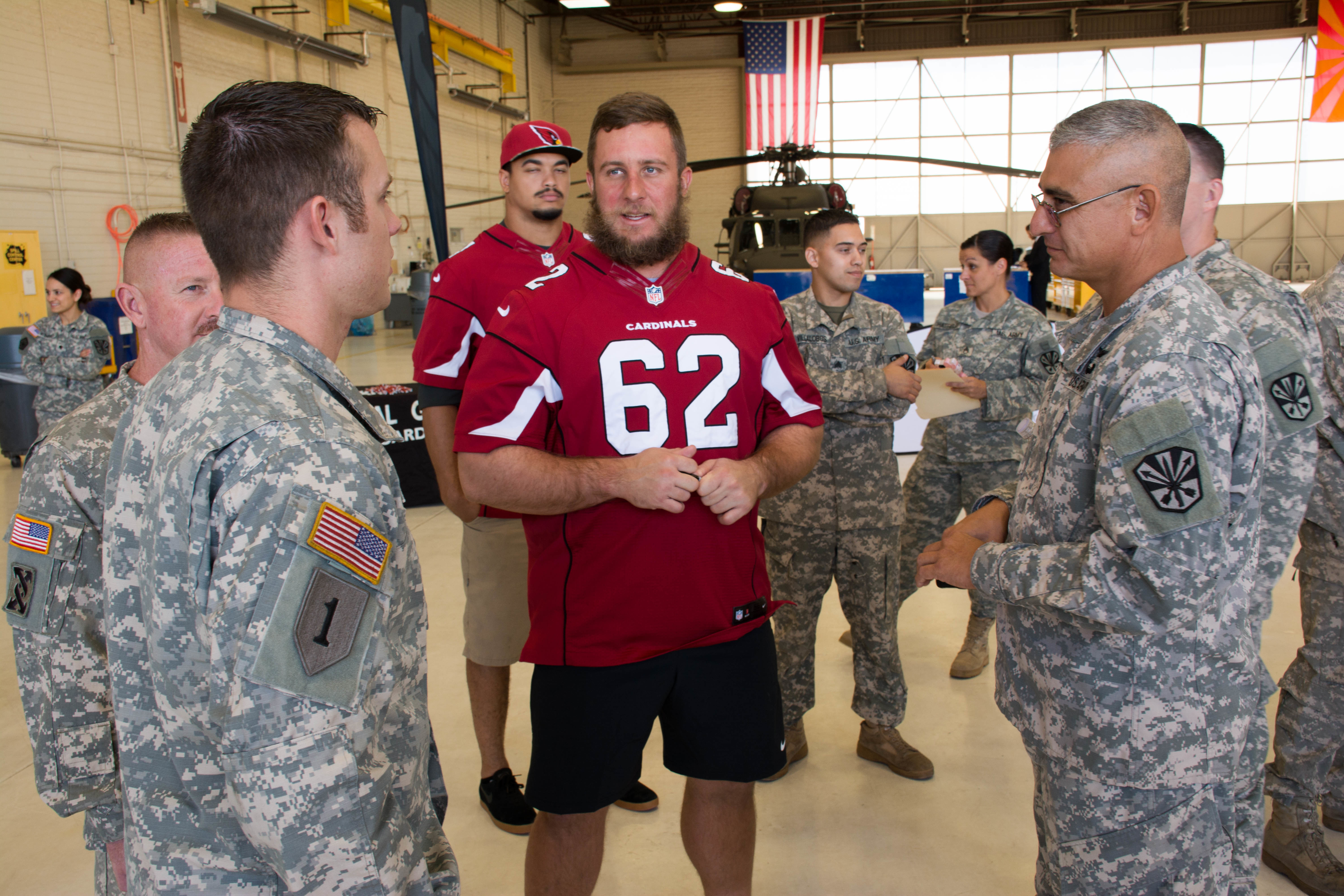
Cardinals' guard Ted Larsen visits servicemen at Papago Military Reservation

The Cardinals' playoff drought has exhibited resilience for some fans who have shown longtime devotion to the team. Some fans view the championship drought and loss record as the result of a convoluted "curse" that stems from the team's refusal to cede or share the disputed 1925 NFL title. Fans of the Cardinals are often referred to as the Red Sea or the Bird Gang; notable fans include Blake Shelton and Jordin Sparks. In honor of the tragic death of former safety Pat Tillman, the Cardinals strengthened their relationship with members of the armed forces community. The team regularly markets to military personnel and frequently visits nearby Luke Air Force Base in support of Arizona's servicemen.

== Rivalries ==
=== Divisional ===
==== Los Angeles Rams ====
Both the oldest and most intense divisional rivalry for the Cardinals, the matchup saw both teams first meet during the 1937 NFL season, while the Rams played in Cleveland, and the Cardinals were still originally located in Chicago. Both teams had played in St. Louis for a brief period in their histories, the Cardinals from 1960 to 1987 and the Rams from 1995 to 2015. Their rivalry with the Los Angeles Rams has resurged in recent years as both teams found playoff success, despite the Cardinals' best efforts; the Rams have been 15–3 since hiring head coach Sean McVay in 2017. The Week 17 matchup of the 2020 season saw both teams playing for a playoff berth; despite the injury to Rams quarterback Jared Goff, the Cardinals lost 18–7 and were eliminated from the postseason. The Cardinals' streak ended against the Rams the following season. They took the lead in the NFC over the Rams and started the season 7–0. In the following matchup, the Rams won on Monday Night Football; the Cardinals lost 6 of 10 games after their 7–0 start. The Cardinals would clinch a wild card berth after a week 17 win over the Dallas Cowboys. They played the Rams in Los Angeles and lost 34–11 as Kyler Murray threw 2 interceptions with one returned for a touchdown. The Rams lead the series 50–40–2 while leading the postseason series 2–0.

==== Seattle Seahawks ====
One of the newer rivalries in the NFL, the Cardinals and Seattle Seahawks became divisional rivals after both were moved to the NFC West as a result of the league's realignment in 2002. This rivalry has become one of the NFL's more bitter in recent years, as the mid-to-late 2010s often saw the Seahawks and Cardinals squaring off for NFC West supremacy. The rivalry featured such clashes between the likes of Carson Palmer or Kyler Murray for the Cardinals against Pete Carroll and Russell Wilson for the Seahawks during the era. Seattle leads the series 25–22–1, and the two teams have yet to meet in the playoffs.

==== San Francisco 49ers ====
Though they first met in 1951 and would meet occasionally until 2000, this would not become a full-fledged rivalry until both teams were placed in the NFC West division in 2002. While a close rivalry, it is often lopsided on both ends. After the 49ers won nine of ten meetings between 2009 and 2013, the Cardinals won eight straight meetings between 2014 and 2018. The 49ers lead the series 34–29.

The two teams have yet to meet in the playoffs.

=== Historic ===
==== Chicago Bears ====
The historic rivalry between the Cardinals and the Chicago Bears features the only two teams that remain from the league's inception in 1920. At that time, the Bears were known as the Decatur Staleys, and the Cardinals were the Racine Cardinals. In 1922, the matchup between the teams became known as "The Battle of Chicago" for 38 years, making it the first true rivalry in the league's history. The Bears lead the all-time series 59–29–6.

==== Kansas City Chiefs ====
Whilst the Cardinals were located in St. Louis from 1960 to 1987; the team took part in an instate rivalry with the Kansas City Chiefs, with a trophy being awarded to the winner of the matchup. The series ended after the Cardinals' move to Arizona in 1988. The Chiefs posted a 16–7–2 mark in its Governor's Cup series against the Cardinals from 1968 to 1987, going 3–1–1 in the regular season record and 13–6–1 in preseason play.

== Seasons and overall records ==
=== Single-season records ===
Points scored: 489 (2015)

Passing

- Passing yards: 4,671 – Carson Palmer (2015)
- Passing touchdowns: 35 – Carson Palmer (2015)
- Passes completed: 401 – Kurt Warner (2008)
- Passes attempted: 598 – Kurt Warner (2008)
- Longest completed pass: 98 yards – Doug Russell (1932); Ogden Compton (1957); Jim Hart (1972)

Rushing

- Rushing yards: 1,605 – Ottis Anderson (1979)
- Rushing attempts: 337 – Edgerrin James (2006)
- Rushing touchdowns: 16 – David Johnson (2016)
- Rushing touchdowns (rookie): 10 – Tim Hightower (2008)
- Longest rushing attempt: 83 yards – John David Crow (1958)
- Rushing yards per game: 100.3 yards – Ottis Anderson (1979)

Receiving

- Receptions: 126 – Trey McBride (2025)
- Receiving yards: 1,598 – David Boston (2001)
- Receiving touchdowns: 15 – Sonny Randle (1960)

Returns

- Punt returns in a season: 44 – Vai Sikahema (1987)
- Longest punt return: 99 yards – Patrick Peterson (2011)
- Longest kickoff return: 108 yards – David Johnson (2015)

Kicking

- Field goals: 40 – Neil Rackers (2005)
- Points after touchdown (PAT)s converted: 53 – Pat Harder (1948)
- Punts: 112 – Dave Zastudil (2012)
- Punting yards: 5,209 – Dave Zastudil (2012)

=== Career records ===
- Passing yards: 34,639, Jim Hart (1966–1983)
- Passing touchdowns: 209, Jim Hart (1966–1983)
- Rushing yards: 7,999, Ottis Anderson (1979–1986)
- Rushing touchdowns: 46, Ottis Anderson (1979–1986)
- Receptions: 1,432, Larry Fitzgerald (2004–2020)
- Receiving yards: 15,545, Larry Fitzgerald (2004–2020)
- Passes intercepted: 52, Larry Wilson (1960–1972)
- Field goals made: 282, Jim Bakken (1962–1978)
- Points: 1,380, Jim Bakken (1962–1978)
- Total touchdowns: 110, Larry Fitzgerald (2004–2020)
- Punt return average: 13.7, Charley Trippi (1947–1955)
- Kickoff return average: 28.5, Ollie Matson (1952, 1954–1958)
- Yards per punt average: 44.9, Jerry Norton (1959–1961)
- Sacks: 71.5, Chandler Jones (2016–2021)
- Tackles: 785, Eric Hill (1989–1997)

== Players of note ==
=== Current roster ===
Arizona Cardinals roster
Quarterbacks (QB): 18 Joey Aguilar; 19 Carson Beck; 9 Josh Johnson; Running backs (RB): 22 Tyler Allgeier; 26 Evan Hull; 20 Bam Knight; Wide receivers (WR): 81 Devin Duvernay RS; 80 Simi Fehoko; 82 Reggie Virgil; 83 Harrison Wallace III; Tight ends (TE): 84 Elijah Higgins; 89 Hunter Long; 85 Trey McBride; 47 Teagan Quitoriano	Offensive linemen (OL): 74 Isaiah Adams RG; 58 Hayden Conner LG; 64 Kingsley Eguakun C; 72 Hjalte Froholdt C; 78 Josh Fryar RT; 71 Jon Gaines II RG; 73 Isaac Seumalo LG; 65 Elijah Wilkinson RT; 66 Jayden Williams LT; 79 Jedrick Wills LT; Defensive linemen (DL): 95 Andrew Billings NT; 91 L.J. Collier DT; 98 Jared Harrison-Hunte DE; 51 Roy Lopez NT; 97 Walter Nolen DT; 56 Darius Robinson DT; 55 Dante Stills DT	Linebackers (LB): 5 Baron Browning OLB; 25 Zaven Collins OLB; 50 Jack Gibbens ILB; 54 Eku Leota OLB; 43 Karson Sharar ILB; 0 Cody Simon ILB; 10 Josh Sweat OLB; 1 Mack Wilson ILB; Defensive backs (DB): 3 Budda Baker S; 29 Denzel Burke CB; 13 Kei'Trel Clark CB; 36 Kitan Crawford S; 35 Kalen King CB; 16 Max Melton CB; 42 Dadrion Taylor-Demerson S; 24 Starling Thomas V CB; 21 Garrett Williams CB; 31 Wydett Williams Jr. S; Special teams (ST): 12 Blake Gillikin P; 59 Casey Kreiter LS; 38 Chad Ryland K	Practice squad: -- Ronnie Bell WR; 44 Shawn Bowman TE; 75 Austin Deculus T; 39 Phillip Dorsett WR; 34 Jerome Ford RB; 23 Art Green CB; 30 Shedrick Jackson WR; 67 Demontrey Jacobs T; 7 Zay Jones WR; 37 James Proche WR; 49 Cameron Robertson OLB; 63 Jamaree Salyer G; 69 Valentin Senn T (IPP); 41 Bradyn Swinson OLB; 96 Damonic Williams NT; 53 Riley Wilson LB; 45 Kenny Yeboah TE (PS/I); Reserve: 33 Trey Benson RB (IR); 57 Chase Bisontis RG (IR); 32 Joey Blount S (IR); 17 Kendrick Bourne WR (IR); 86 Jalen Brooks WR (IR); 52 Jordan Burch OLB (IR); 90 Zachary Carter NT (IR/DFR); 6 James Conner RB (IR/DFR); 70 Paris Johnson Jr. LT (IR); 2 Will Johnson CB (IR); 4 Jeremiyah Love RB (IR); 15 Gardner Minshew II QB (IR); 94 Kaleb Proctor DE (IR); 87 Tip Reiman TE (PUP); 14 Michael Wilson WR (IR); 28 Andrew Wingard S (IR) 52 active, 15 practice squad (1 IPP), 17 reserve As of November 17, 2026. Rookies in italics.; Roster; Depth chart; Transactions

=== Retired numbers ===
Chicago / St. Louis / Arizona Cardinals retired numbers
No.	Player	Position	Tenure	Retired
8	Larry Wilson	S	1960–1972	1970
11	Larry Fitzgerald	WR	2004–2020	2026
40	Pat Tillman	S	1998–2001	2004
77	Stan Mauldin	OT	1946–1948	1948
88	J. V. Cain	TE	1974–1978	1979
99	Marshall Goldberg^{1}	HB	1939–1943, 1946–1948	1948

Notes:

1. Although retired, #99 was re-issued to J. J. Watt after the daughter of Marshall Goldberg gave her blessing for Watt to wear it on March 2, 2021. Watt wore #99 for the 2021 and 2022 seasons until his retirement.

=== Pro Football Hall of Famers ===
Chicago / St. Louis / Arizona Cardinals in the Pro Football Hall of Fame
Players
No.	Player	Position(s)	Tenure	Inducted
4	Ernie Nevers	FB	1929–1931; 1930–1931	1963
3	Jim Thorpe	RB	1928	1963
13	Guy Chamberlin	End & Coach	1927–1928	1965
1	John "Paddy" Driscoll	QB	1920–1925	1965
2	Walt Kiesling	G / DT; Coach	1929–1933; 1944	1966
62, 2	Charley Trippi	RB	1947–1955	1968
33	Ollie Matson	RB	1952, 1954–1958	1972
81	Dick "Night Train" Lane	CB	1954–1959	1974
8	Larry Wilson	S	1960–1972	1978
13	Don Maynard	WR	1973	1987
81	Jackie Smith	TE	1963–1977	1994
72	Dan Dierdorf	OT	1971–1983	1996
22	Roger Wehrli	CB	1969–1982	2007
22	Emmitt Smith	RB	2003–2004	2010
35	Aeneas Williams	CB	1991–2000	2014
13	Kurt Warner	QB	2005–2009	2017
32	Edgerrin James	RB	2006–2008	2020
16	Duke Slater	OT	1926–1931	2020
66	Alan Faneca	G	2010	2021
54	Dwight Freeney	DE	2015	2024
11	Larry Fitzgerald	WR	2004–2020	2026
Coaches and Contributors
Name		Position(s)	Tenure	Inducted
Earl "Curly" Lambeau		Coach	1950–1951	1963
Jimmy Conzelman		Coach	1940–1942; 1946–1948	1964
Charles Bidwill		Team Owner	1933–1947	1967
Don Coryell		Head coach	1973–1977	2023

Italics = played a portion of career with the Cardinals and enshrined representing another team
Dierdorf, Smith, Wehrli and Wilson were members of the St. Louis Football Ring of Fame in The Dome at America's Center when the Rams played there from 1995 to 2015.

=== Ring of Honor ===
The Cardinals' Ring of Honor was started in 2006 to mark the opening of State Farm Stadium. It honors former Cardinal greats from all eras of the franchise's history. Following is a list of inductees and the dates that they were inducted.

Elected to the Pro Football Hall of Fame

Arizona Cardinals Ring of Honor
No.	Name	Position(s)	Seasons	Inducted
—	Charles Bidwill	Owner	1933–1947	August 12, 2006
—	Jimmy Conzelman	Coach	1940–1942; 1946–1948	August 12, 2006
1	John "Paddy" Driscoll	QB; Coach	1920–1925; 1920–1922	August 12, 2006
99	Marshall Goldberg	HB	1939–1943; 1946–1948	August 12, 2006
81	Dick "Night Train" Lane	CB	1954–1959	August 12, 2006
33	Ollie Matson	HB	1952, 1954–1958	August 12, 2006
4	Ernie Nevers	FB; Coach	1929–1931; 1930–1931, 1939	August 12, 2006
62, 2	Charley Trippi	HB/QB	1947–1955	August 12, 2006
8	Larry Wilson	S	1960–1972	September 10, 2006
72	Dan Dierdorf	OT	1971–1983	October 16, 2006
40	Pat Tillman	S	1998–2001	November 12, 2006
22	Roger Wehrli	CB	1969–1982	October 14, 2007
35	Aeneas Williams	CB	1991–2000	November 10, 2008
13	Kurt Warner	QB	2005–2009	June 18, 2014
22, 24	Adrian Wilson	S	2001–2012	September 27, 2015
25, 81	Roy Green	WR	1979–1990	October 2, 2016
7, 17	Jim Hart	QB	1966–1983	December 3, 2017
3	Carson Palmer	QB	2013–2017	September 29, 2019
11	Larry Fitzgerald	WR	2004–2020	October 25, 2026

== Staff ==
The Cardinals have had 42 head coaches throughout their history. Their first head coach was Paddy Driscoll, who compiled a 17–8–4 record with the team from 1920 to 1922. Jimmy Conzelman, Jim Hanifan and Ken Whisenhunt are tied as the longest-serving head coaches in Cardinals history. On April 14, 2022, Mark Ahlemeier, the Cardinals equipment manager, retired after working with the organization for 41 seasons. Their most recent head coach was Mike LaFleur

=== Current staff ===
Arizona Cardinals staff
Front office: Owner/chairman/president – Michael Bidwill; General manager – Monti Ossenfort; Assistant general manager – Dave Sears; Vice president of player personnel – Rob Kisiel; Vice president of football operations & facilities – Matt Caracciolo; Vice president of football administration – Matt Harriss; Director of pro personnel – Glen Fox; Director of college scouting – Vacant; Assistant director of college scouting – Alfonza Knight; Head coach: Head coach – Mike LaFleur; Offensive coaches: Offensive coordinator – Nathaniel Hackett; Quarterbacks – Matt Schaub; Running backs – Matt Merritt; Wide receivers – Tony Sorrentino; Tight ends – Jake Moreland; Offensive line – Justin Frye; Assistant offensive line – Chris Cook; Pass game specialist – Connor Senger; Offensive quality control – Brett Ekkens; Bill Bidwill fellowship – Wendy Laurent	Defensive coaches: Defensive coordinator – Nick Rallis; Defensive line – Pete Kwiatkowski; Assistant defensive line – Alec Osborne; Outside linebackers – Matt Feeney; Inside linebackers – Rod Wilson; Defensive backs – Cristian Garcia; Cornerbacks – Zac Etheridge; Senior defensive assistant – Teryl Austin; Defensive quality control – Brent Jackson; Special teams coaches: Special teams coordinator – Michael Ghobrial; Assistant special teams – Sam Sewell; Strength and conditioning: Director, football performance – Shea Thompson; Head strength and conditioning – Kyle Sammons; Assistant strength and conditioning – Matt King; Assistant strength and conditioning – Rich Pruett; Reconditioning/Assistant strength and conditioning – Aaron Sanchez; Senior reconditioning coordinator – Buddy Morris; → Coaching staff → Front office → More NFL staffs

== Radio and television ==
The Cardinals' flagship radio station is KMVP-FM; J.P. Shadrick, A. Q. Shipley, and Paul Calvisi handle the radio broadcast. Spanish-language radio broadcasts are heard on the combo of KQMR/KHOV-FM "Latino Mix" under a contract with Univisión, signed in 2015. Before 2015, they were heard on KDVA/KVVA-FM "José FM", as well as co-owned KBMB AM 710. The Cardinals were the first NFL team to offer all 20 preseason and regular season games on Spanish-language radio, doing so in 2000. Luis Hernandez and Rolando Cantú are the Spanish broadcast team. The Cardinals have the most extensive Mexican affiliate network in the NFL, with contracts with Grupo Larsa (in the state of Sonora) and Grupo Radiorama (outside Sonora) and stations in 20 cities, including Hermosillo, Guadalajara and Mexico City.

From 2017 to 2023, NBC affiliate KPNX broadcasts the team's preseason games on television (which, that year, included the Hall of Fame Game broadcast by NBC), called by Pasch and Wolfley, with station anchor Paul Gerke as sideline reporter. The broadcasts were syndicated regionally to KTTU and KMSB-TV in Tucson, and, until the Raiders' move to Las Vegas, KVVU-TV in Las Vegas.

In 2024, KTVK and KPHO purchased preseason broadcast rights to the Cardinals. This will be in addition to any Cardinals games already scheduled for KPHO.

=== English radio affiliates ===
Map of radio affiliates

City (all in Arizona)	Call sign	Frequency
Phoenix	KTAR AM	620 AM
Phoenix	KMVP-FM	98.7 FM
Tucson	KTZR AM	1450 AM
Safford	KATO AM	1230 AM
Sedona	KAZM AM	780 AM
Lake Havasu City	KNTR AM	980 AM
Prescott	KQNA AM	1130 AM
Prescott	KDDL FM	94.3 FM
Flagstaff	KVNA AM	600 AM
Holbrook	KZUA-FM	92.1 FM
Yuma	KBLU	560 AM
Pinetop	KNKI FM	106.7 FM
Miami	KIKO AM	1340 AM
Kingman	KGMN-FM	100.1 FM

=== Former affiliates ===
- KTAR-FM/92.3: Glendale
- KESZ/99.9: Phoenix
- KGLQ/96.9: Phoenix
- KIDR/740: Phoenix
- KCAZ/99.5: Rough Rock
- KSLX-FM/100.7: Scottsdale
- KTAN/1420: Sierra Vista
- KRVZ/1400: Springerville
- KDUS/1060: Tempe
- KUCB/1290: Tucson
- KWRK/96.1: Window Rock
- WCFL/1000: Chicago
- WGN/720: Chicago
- WIND/560: Chicago
- KMOX/1120: St. Louis
- KDEF/1150: Albuquerque
- KEBC/1560: Del City
- KYAL-FM/97.1: Muskogee

== Notes ==
Preceded by Cleveland Bulldogs	NFL champions Chicago Cardinals; 1925	Succeeded by Frankford Yellow Jackets
Preceded by Chicago Bears	NFL champions Chicago Cardinals; 1947	Succeeded by Philadelphia Eagles
