= Bill Bidwill =

American businessman (1931–2019)

- Born: William Vogel Bidwill; July 31, 1931; Chicago, Illinois, U.S.
- Died: October 2, 2019 (aged 88); Phoenix, Arizona, U.S.
- Education: Georgetown University
- Occupation: Businessman
- Years active: 1962–2019
- Known for: Principal owner and chairman of the Arizona Cardinals
- Board member of: Chair (Arizona Cardinals)
- Children: 5; including Michael
- Parent(s): Charles Bidwill; Violet Bidwill
- Awards: NFL Alumni Order of the Leather Helmet (1982)

William Vogel Bidwill (July 31, 1931 – October 2, 2019) was an American businessman and the owner of the Arizona Cardinals of the National Football League (NFL). He had co-owned the team from 1962 for ten seasons with his brother Charles Jr. and had been sole owner from 1972 until his death in 2019.

The team has been owned by the Bidwill family since 1932. Bill’s father, Charles Sr., purchased the then-Chicago Cardinals for $50K (the equivalent of ~$918K in 2018).

== Early life and education ==
Born in Chicago, Bidwill and his elder brother Charles were adopted by Charles and Violet Bidwill, owners of the then-Chicago Cardinals. Bidwill attended Georgetown Preparatory School, then enlisted in the U.S. Navy until 1956. He went to college at Georgetown University, and after his graduation, moved to St. Louis a few months before the Cardinals moved there.

== Professional sports ==
=== Chicago Cardinals ===
Charles Bidwill purchased the team, then known as the Chicago Cardinals, from David Jones in 1933. After his death at age 51 in 1947, his widow authorized business partner Ray Bennigsen to carry on management of the team. Violet Bidwill married St. Louis businessman Walter Wolfner in 1949 and he later became managing director.

=== St. Louis Cardinals ===
Prior to the 1960 season, Violet moved the Cardinals to St. Louis. Charles Jr. and Bill inherited the team after their mother's death in January 1962, and served as co-owners for ten seasons, until Bill purchased it outright in 1972. Among NFL franchises, only the Chicago Bears and New York Giants have been controlled by one family longer than the Cardinals.

=== Arizona Cardinals ===
Bidwill's ownership was marked by little success. In his 64 years as at least part-owner, the Cardinals only made the playoffs eight times (1974, 1975, 1982, 1998, 2008, 2009, 2014, and 2015) and had only nine other winning seasons. He moved the team to Phoenix, Arizona prior to the 1988 season after St. Louis refused to build a new stadium to replace Busch Memorial Stadium. Bidwill had also publicly pledged to support a future effort to gain an expansion franchise for St. Louis. Instead, he voted to approve a new franchise in Jacksonville, Florida. However, St. Louis eventually gained a new franchise anyway, the relocated Los Angeles Rams in 1995. The Rams returned to Los Angeles in 2016.

Bidwill had a reputation for running the Cardinals rather cheaply; the Cardinals had one of the lowest payrolls in the league for many years. Following the move to State Farm Stadium in 2006, the team began to spend more money. The increased revenue paid off in 2008, when the Cardinals won their division for the first time since 1975 (when the team was based in St. Louis), hosted a playoff game for only the second time in franchise history (the previous coming in 1947 as a Chicago team) and advanced to Super Bowl XLIII. They won two more division titles in 2009 and 2015.

On September 11, 2022, Bidwill was inducted into the Arizona Cardinals Ring of Honor at a halftime ceremony where he is honored along with his father Charles.

== Personal life ==
Bidwill ceded most day-to-day control over the Cardinals to his sons Michael and Bill Jr., who serve as team president and vice president, respectively. Bidwill also had two other sons, Patrick and Tim, and a daughter, Nicole. After the death of Ralph Wilson in March 2014, Bidwill became the longest-tenured owner in the NFL.

=== Death ===
Bidwill died at age 88 on October 2, 2019. At the time of his death, he was the longest tenured owner in the NFL.

== Legacy ==
Following an $8,000,000 donation, his son Michael dedicated a new stadium at his alma mater Georgetown Prep named the William V. Bidwill ’49 Stadium. This 1,508 seat stadium is the new home to the Hoyas football, soccer and lacrosse programs.

Sporting positions
Preceded by Violet Bidwill Wolfner	St. Louis/Phoenix/Arizona Cardinals principal owner 1960–2019; Served alongside: Charles Bidwill Jr. (1960–1972)	Succeeded by Michael Bidwill
