= Michael Bidwill =

American sports team owner and former prosecutor (born 1964)

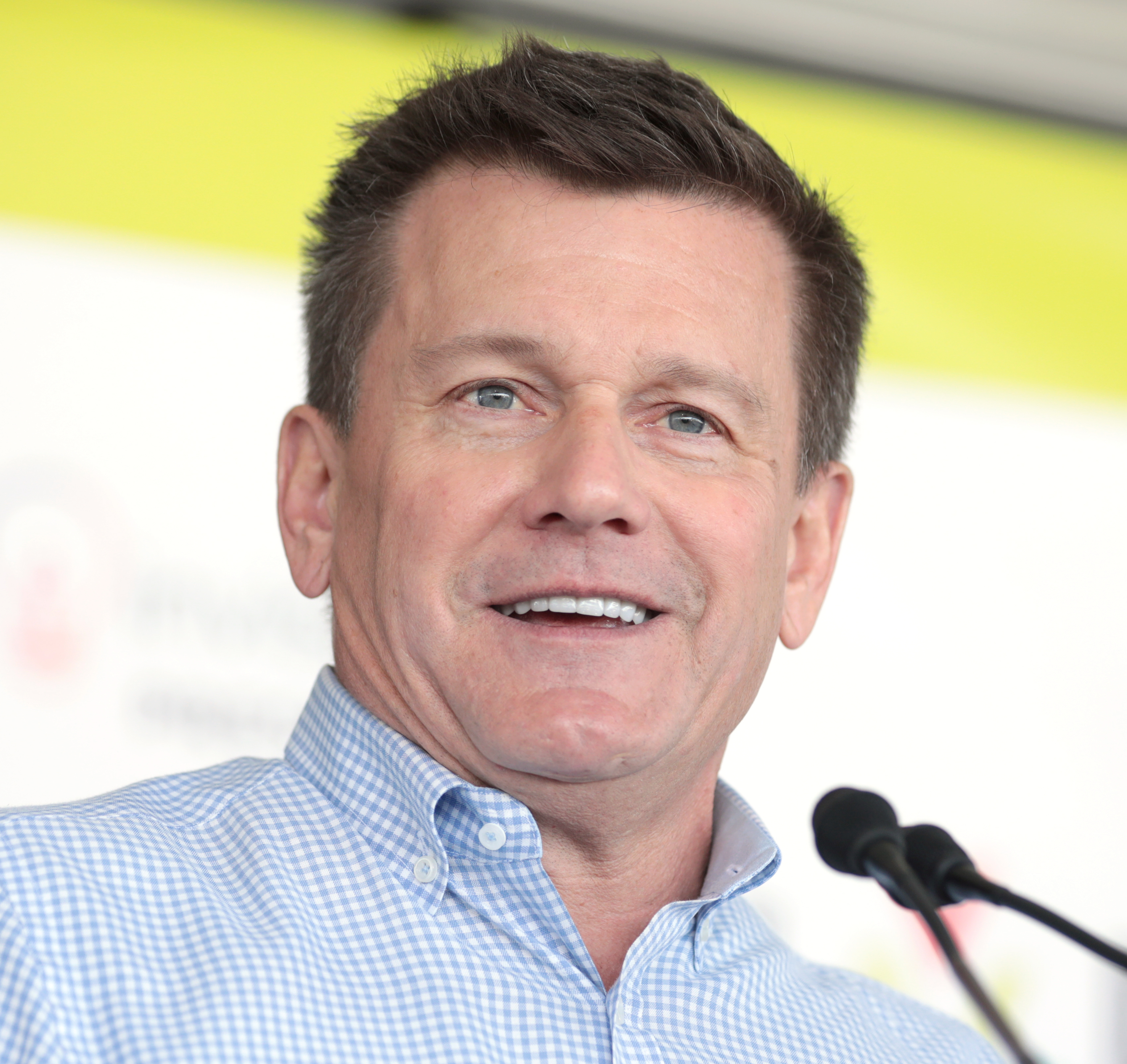
- Bidwill in 2022
- Born: December 6, 1964 (age 61); St. Louis, Missouri, U.S.
- Education: Saint Louis University (BS); Catholic University of America (JD)
- Occupations: Businessman; prosecutor
- Known for: Principal owner, chairman, and president of the Arizona Cardinals
- Father: Bill Bidwill

Michael Bidwill (born December 6, 1964) is an American businessman and attorney who is the principal owner, chairman, and president of the Arizona Cardinals of the National Football League (NFL). After practicing law for six years as a federal prosecutor, he joined the Arizona Cardinals organization in 1996 as vice president and general counsel.

Bidwill inherited the team from his father, Bill Bidwill, who was at least part-owner from 1962 until his death in 2019. He had been operating head of the franchise since becoming team president in 2007.

== Early life and education ==
Bidwill grew up the second of five children in his family, and is the third generation of his family to own the Cardinals. His grandfather, Charles Bidwill, bought the Cardinals in 1933, while they were still in Chicago. When Charles died in 1947, his widow, Violet, inherited the team, moving it to St. Louis in 1960. Upon Violet's death, ownership passed to father Bill and uncle Charles Bidwill Jr., with Bill becoming sole owner in 1971. Only the Chicago Bears (owned by the Halas-McCaskey family since 1921) and New York Giants (owned by the Mara family since their founding in 1925) have been in the hands of a single family longer than the Cardinals.

Bidwill began to enjoy American football when he visited the Cardinals' training camp for the first time in 1969. In 1974, his father, Bill, made him one of the team's ball boys including his brothers William Jr., Patrick, and Tim. Said Bidwill in 2007: "I understood at a young age that when you don't win, there will be criticism." Michael Bidwill attended Georgetown Preparatory School in North Bethesda, Maryland and later earned a Bachelor of Science degree in finance from Saint Louis University in 1987 where he was a member of Phi Delta Theta. Later, he received his Juris Doctor from The Catholic University of America Columbus School of Law in 1990.

Bidwill followed the Cardinals to Phoenix in 1988. From 1990 to 1996, he was a federal prosecutor in Phoenix. In 1996, he worked for Bob Dole's presidential campaign.

== Professional sports ==
=== Arizona Cardinals ===
While the Cardinals struggled to fill Sun Devil Stadium, Bidwill publicly stated that fans would respond in greater numbers if given a better environment. He additionally emphasized that the team could not compete without the revenue streams a new stadium would bring. The Cardinals have sold out all 100 games played at State Farm Stadium (originally University of Phoenix Stadium) since the stadium opened in 2006. They sold out 12 total games in 18 seasons at Sun Devil Stadium. In their first nine seasons at State Farm Stadium, the Cardinals won their division three times, earned three playoff berths and finished .500 or better six times. They had two seasons of .500 or better in their first 18 seasons (1988–2006) since their arrival in Arizona from St. Louis. In 2007, Bill Bidwill named Michael as team president and ceded most day-to-day control over the Cardinals to Michael, making his son operating head of the franchise.

In October 2014, Cardinals general manager Steve Keim called Bidwill "the glue that holds the organization together." Quarterback Carson Palmer said "It's easy to say it's the head coach or the GM. It's the owner," Palmer said. "And you would never know it. He doesn't want to be here when the media's here. He's not doing interviews left and right, but he's picked the right people to hire and he wants to win. … He doesn't have a hand in every decision, cutting this guy, bringing in this guy. He's hired the right people, and he knows it."

In July 2018, Bidwill announced his support for longtime friend and fellow Georgetown Prep classmate Brett Kavanaugh as a Supreme Court Justice nominee. The move generated controversy, as Bidwill used the Arizona Cardinals website and social media outlets to voice his support. This came just two months after NFL owners voted to restrict NFL players' ability to protest during the national anthem.

After his father's death in October 2019, Bidwill succeeded his father as chairman. He is only the sixth principal owner in franchise history; it was founded in 1898 in Chicago as an independent team and was a charter member of the NFL in 1920.

== Other positions ==
In addition to his role with the Cardinals, Bidwill has been active in the greater Phoenix business community where he has been an advocate for economic growth and development.

From 2008 to 2010, Bidwill served back-to-back terms as Chairman of Greater Phoenix Economic Council (GPEC). He is also a board member of Greater Phoenix Leadership (GPL), an organization composed of the region's top business and civic leaders. In July 2011, Bidwill and 16 business leaders in the state were appointed to the Arizona Commerce Authority Board of Directors. Michael is also a member of the board for the Pat Tillman Foundation, which carries on the legacy of the former Cardinals safety killed in Afghanistan in 2004.

In 2010, Bidwill was selected by the Phoenix Business Journal as one of its 25 "Most Admired CEO's." In 2009, he received the Leader for Tomorrow award from the Boy Scouts of America.

In 2014, it was announced that Bidwill was named the chair of the league's new conduct committee. Composed of representatives of NFL ownership, the committee will review the league's Personal Conduct Policy at least annually and recommend appropriate changes with advice from outside experts. He also chairs the NFL's Security and Fan Conduct Committee, a group of eight club executives that oversees and develops best security practices for NFL facilities. He also serves on the board of the National Football League Foundation, which in 2013 awarded more than $23 million in grants to support youth and high school football programs, health and safety efforts, as well as community health initiatives. Bidwill has also been a member of the league's Business Ventures Committee since 2007 when Commissioner Roger Goodell appointed him to it.

Bidwill serves on Arizona's Super Bowl Host Committee. The group oversaw the successful staging of Super Bowl XLII at University of Phoenix Stadium in 2008. It also brought Super Bowl XLIX, which was played on February 1, 2015, and its half billion dollar economic impact to the state. Super Bowl XLIX was played at University of Phoenix Stadium on February 1, 2015. After the 2015 game, NFL Commissioner Roger Goodell said, "Arizona earned it … this community has wrapped their arms around every opportunity and made the Super Bowl even bigger and better for our fans and for the NFL over all," Goodell said at his annual Super Bowl news conference. "We're thrilled about being here, and we look forward to coming back."

A January 2014 poll in the Phoenix Business Journal asked "what business leader had the best 2013?" Michael Bidwill finished first with 34% of the vote.

== Controversy ==
=== Cheating and workplace misconduct allegations ===
In 2023, former Arizona Cardinals vice president of player personnel Terry McDonough filed an arbitration complaint to the NFL accusing Bidwill of gross misconduct, including cheating, discrimination and harassment. Among the allegations were complaints that Bidwill retaliated against employees for pushing back against a scheme to improperly communicate with then-GM Steve Keim during Keim's five-week suspension for DUI; that Bidwill had verbally abused multiple employees, including two pregnant women. Bidwill cancelled a 2019 survey of workplace culture. Bidwill has been accused of fostering a workplace culture where employees were "working in fear" due to his regular verbal abuse and hostility in professional relationships. Bidwill has also been accused of publicly berating two team executives at all-staff meetings after their respective DUI arrests, Keim in 2018 and former COO Ron Minegar in 2019.

The Arizona Cardinals disputed the allegations against Bidwill; per a statement by public relations adviser Jim McCarthy, "[the] claims [McDonough] has made in an arbitration filing are wildly false, reckless, and an opportunistic ploy for financial gain." An arbitration ruling in April 2024 ordered the Cardinals to pay McDonough $3,000,000 for defamation in the organization's response to McDonough's filing, in which the organization falsely accused McDonough of "extreme domestic violence" and abandoning responsibility for his daughter.

In 2025, former assistant Brittany Neuheisel sued Bidwell on claims related to workplace harassment.

== Personal life ==
Thanks due to his $8,000,000 donation to his alma mater, Georgetown Prep, Michael dedicated a stadium in honor of his father, the William V. Bidwill ’49 Stadium. This new 1,508-seat stadium is the new home to the Hoyas' football, soccer and lacrosse programs.

Sporting positions
Preceded by Bill Bidwill	Arizona Cardinals principal owner 2019–present	Incumbent
