= Ray Bennigsen =

American business executive (1902–1986)

Ray C. Bennigsen (1902–1986) was an American business executive who served as president of the Chicago Cardinals of the National Football League (NFL) from 1947 to 1951.

Bennigsen joined Bentley, Murray and Co., a printing company owned by Charles Bidwill, in 1927 as a salesman. Bennigsen eventually became Bidwell's right-hand man and assisted with all of his businesses, which included the printing company, the Chicago Cardinals, the Chicago Bluebirds of the National Girls Baseball League, Hawthorne Race Course, and Sportsman's Park. Following Bidwell's death in 1947, Bennigsen took over as president of the Cardinals. The Cardinals would win the 1947 NFL Championship Game and repeat as western conference champions in 1948, but struggled during the next two seasons. He resigned in the summer of 1951 and was succeeded by Charles Bidwill Jr.

After leaving the Cardinals, Benningsen served as a vice president at another printing company (Hillison & Etten) and was part owner of Fairmount Park Racetrack. During a 1960 stalemate over the selection of a new National Football League Commissioner, Art Rooney proposed Bennigsen as a compromise candidate. Another compromise candidate, Los Angeles Rams general manager Pete Rozelle, would be hired four days later. Bennigsen died on September 29, 1986, at his home in Winnetka, Illinois. He was 83 years old.
