= Million Dollar Backfield (Chicago Cardinals) =

1950s NFL offensive backfield

Million Dollar Backfield - Chicago Cardinals

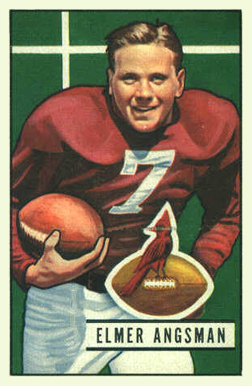
Elmer Angsman

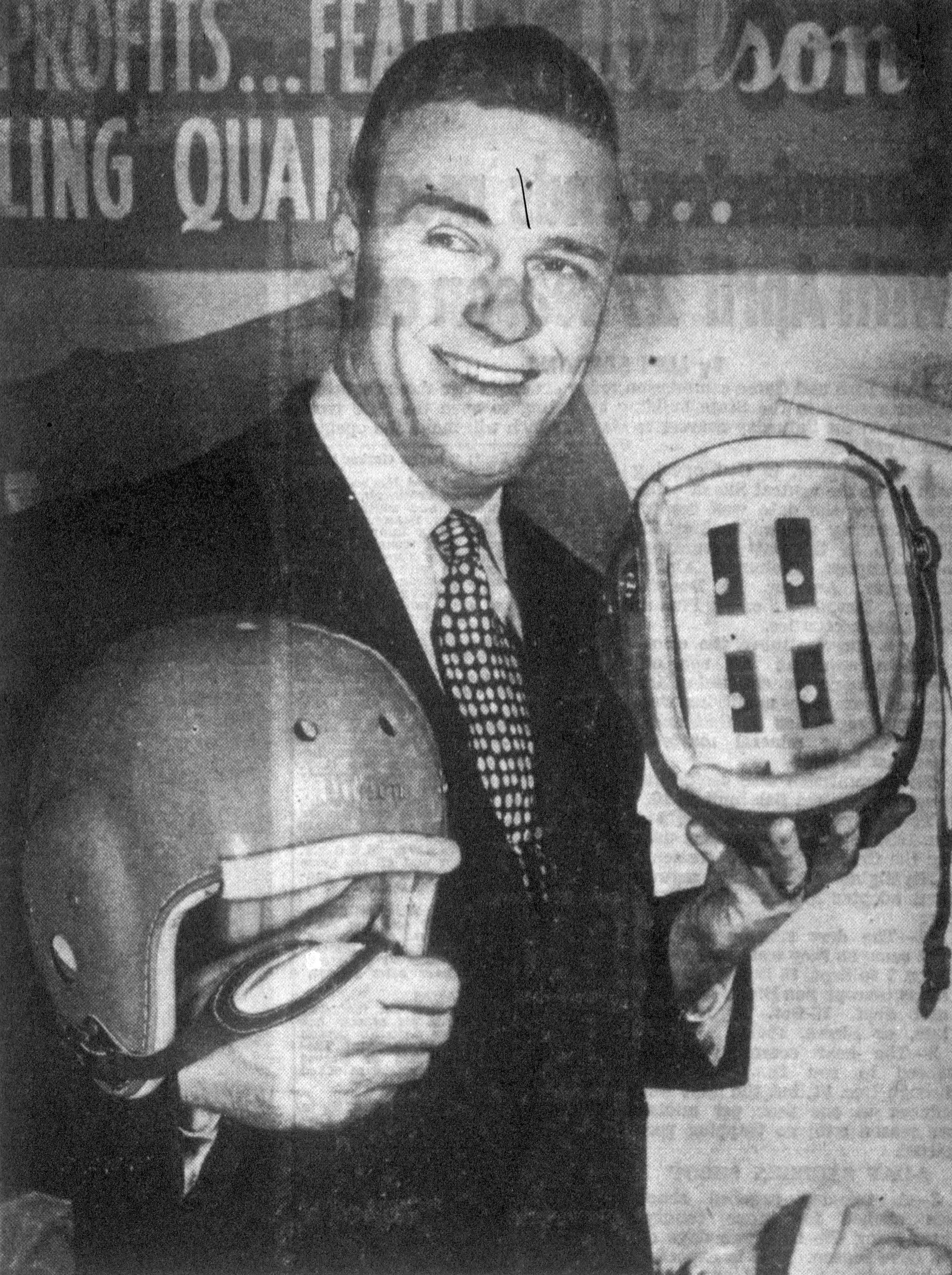
Paul Christman

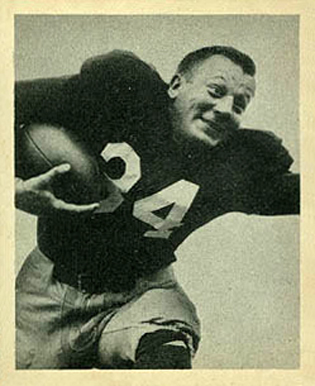
Pat Harder

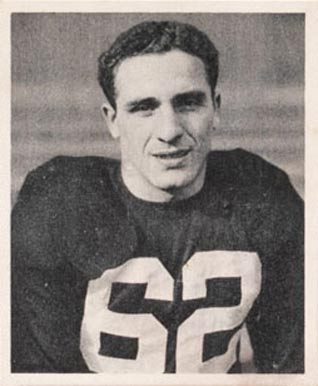
Charley Trippi

The Million Dollar Backfield was a National Football League (NFL) offensive backfield of the Chicago Cardinals in 1947 after an unprecedented amount of money by Cardinals owner Charles Bidwill lured several of the day's top players to the team. The Million Dollar backfield was also referred to separately as the Dream Backfield by Bidwill.

== Line-up ==
Name	Position	Seasons with Cardinals	HOF induction
Elmer Angsman	HB	1946–1952	
Paul Christman	QB	1945–1949	
Pat Harder	FB	1946–1950	
Charley Trippi	Halfback	1947–1955	1968

== History ==
After World War II, professional football experienced an increase in popularity. The Cardinals hired Jimmy Conzelman as their new head coach. Soon afterwards Conzelman implemented the “T” formation. He then drafted quarterback Paul Christman in 1945 to run the offense. A year later, fullback Pat Harder and halfback Elmer Angsman were added to the line-up.

It was around this time that the upstart All-America Football Conference (AAFC) placed a team in Chicago, the Rockets. The new AAFC franchise publicly pushed for the Cardinals to leave town, since the city had three major football teams. Bidwill grew angry and vowed to turn his team into a profitable winner. He stunned the football world in 1947 when he outbid the Rockets for the rights to All-American, Charley Trippi, signing him to a then unprecedented $100,000 contract. Trippi was the final piece of what Bidwill called his "Million Dollar Backfield" of Elmer Angsman, Paul Christman, Pat Harder, and Trippi. They would play their first season together in 1946. The quartet led the Cardinals to defeat their cross-town nemesis, the Chicago Bears, in the season finale to win the NFL's Western Division title with 9–3 record. The backfield then led the team to their first and only undisputed NFL championship in 1947. Charles Bidwill did not live see his "Million Dollar Backfield" win the 1947 title in December; he had died of pneumonia on April 19 after signing Trippi. Control of the team shifted to Violet Bidwill, who owned the team until her death in 1962. Jimmy Conzelman retired as coach of the Cardinals after the 1948 season, with Phil Handler and Buddy Parker being hired to coach the team for the 1949 season, which saw them go 6–5–1. The following year saw Curly Lambeau hired to serve as head coach and given control of the team. The Backfield lost its first member when Christman was traded to the Green Bay Packers by the team before the 1950 season, with the idea to have Jim Hardy serve as quarterback for a bigger passing attack. Hardy proceeded to throw eight interceptions in the first game and the team went 5–7, the first losing season since 1945. Harder was traded in the offseason to the Detroit Lions. The skidding continued, even after Lambeau was fired in 1951. The group never finished higher than 3rd from 1948 until the last member of the backfield in Charley Trippi retired in 1955.

== See also ==
- History of the Chicago Cardinals
- Million Dollar Backfield (San Francisco 49ers)
