= Red Sea (football) =

Nickname for fans of the Arizona Cardinals

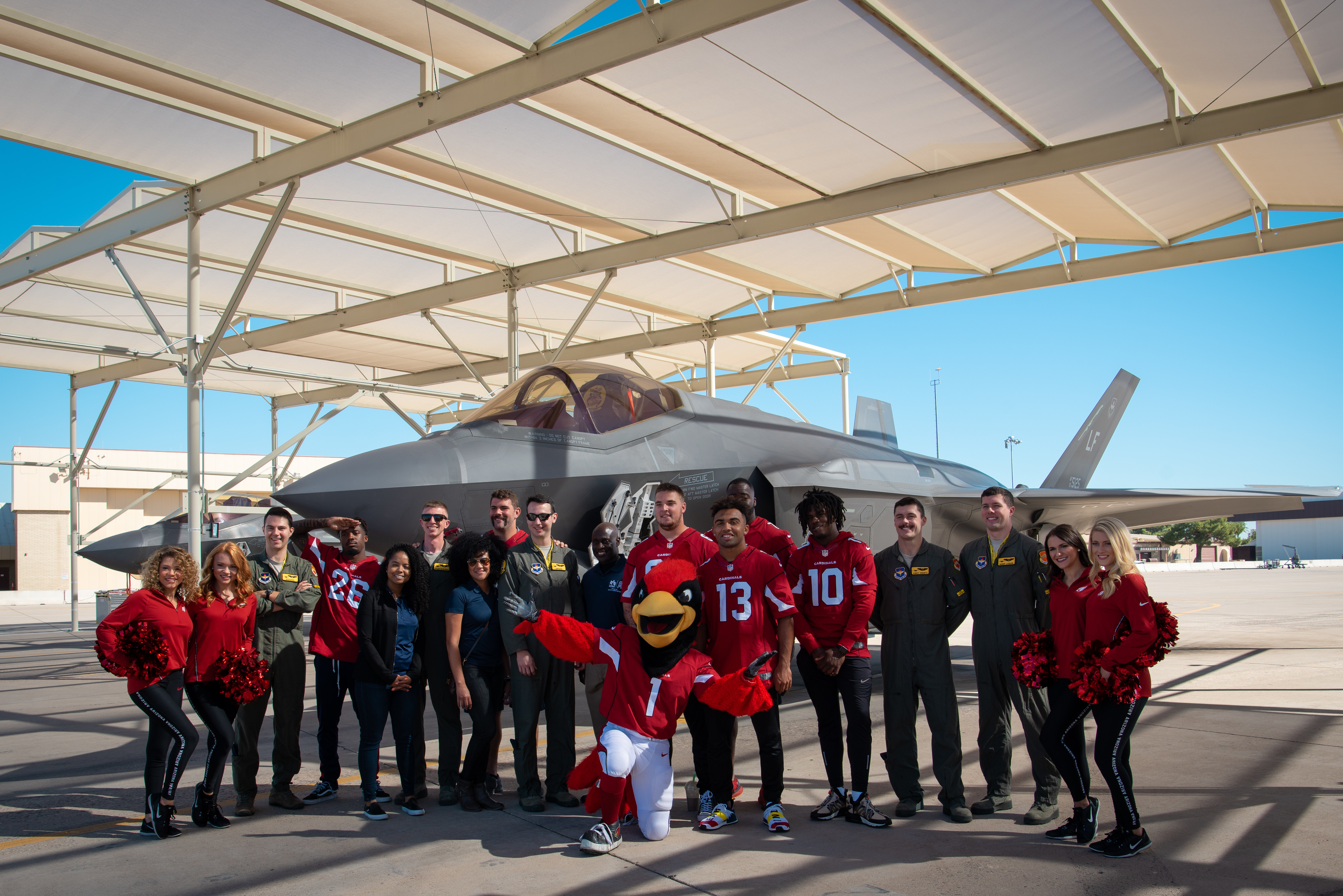
Members of the Cardinals organization visit servicemen at Luke Air Force Base

The Red Sea (or Bird Gang) is a nickname for the fanbase of the Arizona Cardinals that arose after the team's move to Phoenix from St. Louis in 1988.

The Cardinals fanbase has grown steadily ever since even though Arizona's population includes many transplants who still root for other football teams, and even though the Cardinals hold the longest active title drought in professional sports, as of 2020. Fans showed their devotion as the team made playoff pushes during the late 2000s and through the 2010s.

== See also ==
- 12s
