= 1972 St. Louis Cardinals (NFL) season =

American football team season

1972 St. Louis Cardinals season
- Owner: Bill Bidwill
- Head coach: Bob Hollway
- Home stadium: Busch Memorial Stadium

Results
- Record: 4–9–1
- Division place: 4th NFC East
- Playoffs: Did not qualify
- Pro Bowlers: None

The 1972 St. Louis Cardinals season was the team's 53rd year with the National Football League and thirteenth in St. Louis. On September 2, Bill Bidwill purchased the stock of his brother Charles "Stormy" Bidwill to become sole owner of the Cardinals. The adopted sons of Charles and Violet Bidwill, the two had co-owned the team since their mother's death in January 1962.

After starting at 2–2, with wins over 1970 and 1971 playoff participants Baltimore and Minnesota, the Cardinals went 0–7–1, then won their final two games over the Rams and Eagles to finish at 4–9–1 for the second consecutive season and third time in the past four.

Second-year head coach Bob Hollway was fired on December 18, the day after the regular season finale, and succeeded a month later by San Diego State head coach Don Coryell.

== Offseason ==
=== NFL draft ===
1972 St. Louis Cardinals draft
Round	Pick	Player	Position	College	Notes
1	4	Bobby Moore *	Wide receiver	Oregon	
Made roster * Made at least one Pro Bowl during career

== Personnel ==
=== Staff / Coaches ===
1972 St. Louis Cardinals staff
Front office: Principal Owner/de facto General Manager - Bill Bidwill; Head coaches: Head Coach – Bob Hollway; Offensive coaches: Offensive Backs - Bill Thornton; Assistant Offensive Backs - Paul Lanham; Offensive line – Bill Austin; Receivers Coach – Lew Carpenter; Offensive Assistant - Ed Hughes	Defensive coaches: Defensive Coordinator / Linebackers – Chuck Drulis; Defensive Line / Linebackers – Bob Leach; Defensive Backs - Larry Wilson; Special teams coaches: Special Teams - Paul Lanham

=== Roster ===
1972 St. Louis Cardinals roster
Quarterbacks: 15 Gary Cuozzo; 17 Jim Hart; 16 Tim Van Galder; Running backs: 44 Donny Anderson P; 48 Craig Baynham; 38 Leon Burns FB; 47 Steve Conley; 32 Leo Hayden; 23 Johnny Roland; 27 Roy Shivers; Wide receivers: 85 Mel Gray; 84 Walker Gillette; 88 Fred Hyatt; 28 Ahmad Rashad; 42 Bob Wicks; Tight ends: 83 Jim McFarland; 30 Ara Person; 81 Jackie Smith	Offensive linemen: 54 Tom Banks C; 55 Dave Bradley G; 72 Dan Dierdorf T; 60 Conrad Dobler G; 65 Chuck Hutchison G; 73 Ernie McMillan T; 50 Wayne Mulligan C; 62 Steve Wright T; 64 Bob Young G; Defensive linemen: 89 Tom Beckman DE; 62 Martin Imhof DE; 76 Scott Palmer DT; 71 John Richardson DT; 75 Bob Rowe DT; 78 Ron Yankowski DE	Linebackers: 57 Mark Arneson; 60 Jim Hargrove; 59 Jeff Lyman; 56 Mike McGill; 58 Terry Miller; 67 Larry Stallings; 53 Jamie Rivers; Defensive backs: 31 Chuck Beatty S; 20 Miller Farr CB; 49 Dale Hackbart FS; 43 Norm Thompson CB; 40 Eric Washington CB; 22 Roger Wehrli SS; 8 Larry Wilson S; Special teams: 25 Jim Bakken K	Reserve lists Practice squad rookies in italics

== Regular season ==
=== Schedule ===
Week	Date	Opponent	Result	Record	Venue	Attendance
1	September 17	at Baltimore Colts	**W** 10–3	1–0	Memorial Stadium	53,652
2	September 24	at **Washington Redskins**	**L** 10–24	1–1	RFK Stadium	53,039
3	October 1	Pittsburgh Steelers	**L** 19–25	1–2	Busch Memorial Stadium	49,140
4	October 8	at Minnesota Vikings	**W** 19–17	2–2	Metropolitan Stadium	49,687
5	October 15	**Washington Redskins**	**L** 3–33	2–3	Busch Memorial Stadium	50,454
6	October 22	at **New York Giants**	**L** 21–27	2–4	Yankee Stadium	62,756
7	October 29	Chicago Bears	**L** 10–27	2–5	Busch Memorial Stadium	50,464
8	November 5	at **Philadelphia Eagles**	**T** 6–6	2–5–1	Veterans Stadium	65,720
9	November 12	at **Dallas Cowboys**	**L** 24–33	2–6–1	Texas Stadium	65,218
10	November 19	**New York Giants**	**L** 7–13	2–7–1	Busch Memorial Stadium	48,014
11	November 27	at Miami Dolphins	**L** 10–31	2–8–1	Miami Orange Bowl	80,010
12	December 3	**Dallas Cowboys**	**L** 6–27	2–9–1	Busch Memorial Stadium	49,787
13	December 10	Los Angeles Rams	**W** 24–14	3–9–1	Busch Memorial Stadium	36,873
14	December 17	**Philadelphia Eagles**	**W** 24–23	4–9–1	Busch Memorial Stadium	34,872
Note: Intra-division opponents are in **bold** text.

=== Standings ===
NFC East
	W	L	T	PCT	DIV	CONF	PF	PA	STK
Washington Redskins	11	3	0	.786	7–1	10–1	336	218	L2
Dallas Cowboys	10	4	0	.714	6–2	7–4	319	240	L1
New York Giants	8	6	0	.571	5–3	7–4	331	247	W1
St. Louis Cardinals	4	9	1	.321	1–6–1	3–7–1	193	303	W2
Philadelphia Eagles	2	11	1	.179	0–7–1	0–10–1	145	352	L5
