= Big Red (Cardinals mascot) =

Mascot for the NFL's Arizona Cardinals

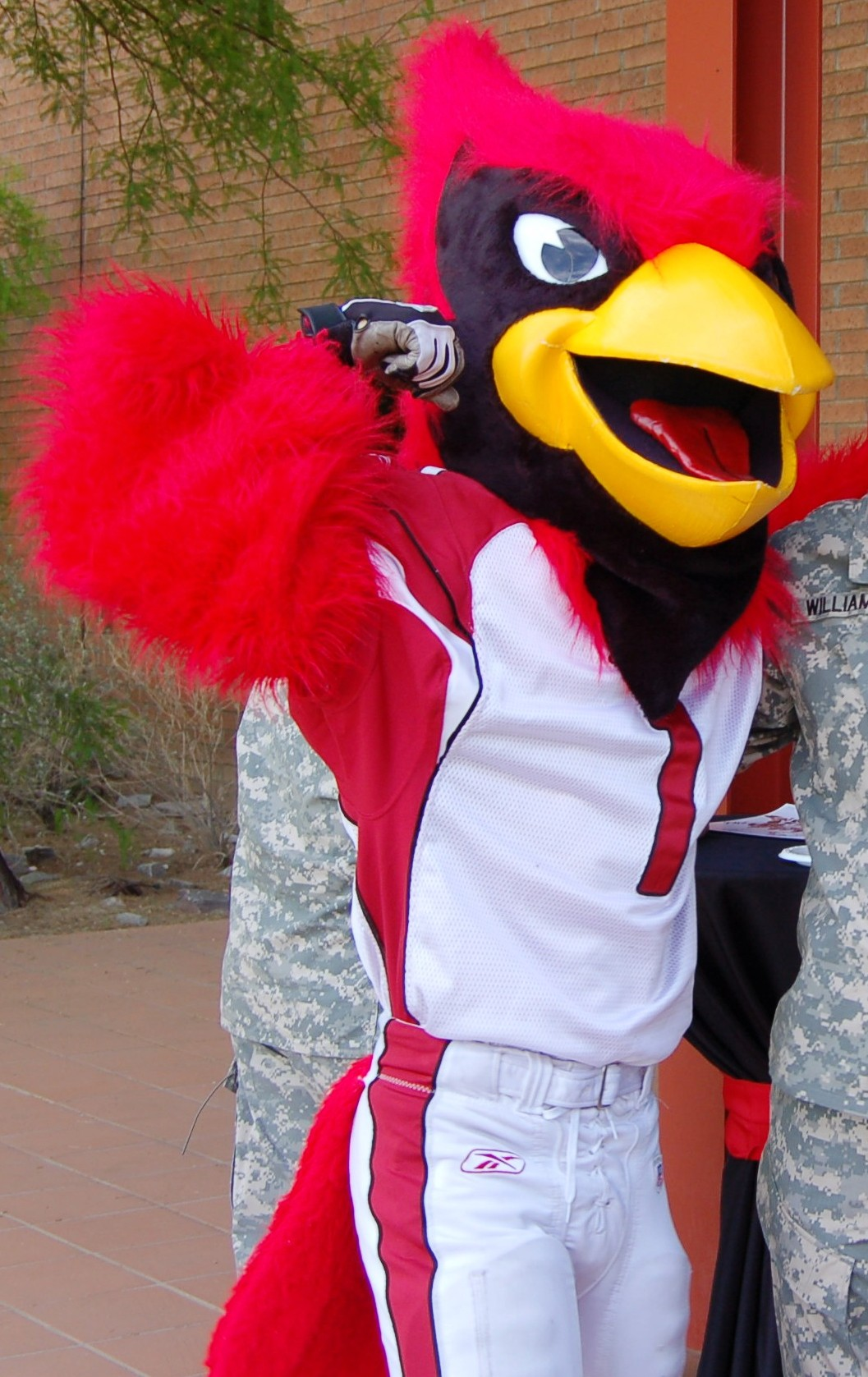
Big Red in April 2009

Big Red is the mascot of the Arizona Cardinals of the NFL. According to his official biography, he "hatched" on October 4, 1998. He is 6 foot 4 inches tall and has a 7-foot wingspan.

He is one of the most recognizable mascots because of his appearance. He appears at every home game, and became their mascot on October 4, 1998.

Big Red has also appeared at Super Bowl XLIII, on February 1, 2009, when the Cardinals went against the eventual champions, the Pittsburgh Steelers.
