= Chris O'Brien (American football) =

American painter and football franchise owner (1881–1951)

Christopher O'Brien (October 23, 1881 – June 3, 1951) was a Chicago, Illinois pro football franchise owner. He was the owner of the Chicago Cardinals (later known as the St. Louis Cardinals, and now the Arizona Cardinals), and has been called the "Father of Professional Football in Chicago". O'Brien was also a co-founder of the American Professional Football Association (renamed the National Football League in 1922) by representing the Cardinals (then called the Racine Cardinals) at the September 17, 1920, league meeting at Ralph Hay's Hupmobile dealership in Canton, Ohio.

== Early Cardinals ownership ==
In 1898, O'Brien organized the Morgan Athletic Club. He and his brother Pat also played on the squad. Chris then changed the club's home games to nearby Normal Field, prompting the new name the Normals. That same year O'Brien gave the team its longstanding moniker when he, finding a bargain, bought used football jerseys from the nearby University of Chicago. Because the jerseys had long since faded from Chicago's traditional maroon color, O'Brien declared, "That's not maroon, it's Cardinal red!" He renamed the team the Racine Cardinals, because Normal Field was located on Racine Avenue in Chicago.

Football in the Chicago area was mostly amateur in the early 1900s, with opponents almost impossible to book, let alone find. This caused O'Brien to suspend the team from 1906 until 1913. By 1917, O'Brien was able to buy new uniforms as well as hire a coach, Marshall Smith. That year the Cardinals won the Chicago City Championship. However, World War I forced the Cardinals to suspend operations again in 1918. After the war, the Cardinals were reorganized, and have played without interruption since then.

== Founding the NFL ==
In 1919, Ralph Hay and George Halas saw the popularity of O'Brien's Cardinals in the Chicago area as a boost to the new league. O'Brien saw this an opportunity to keep costs down and prevent players from jumping from team to team. He traveled to Canton, Ohio in September 1920 and represented Racine (Chicago) at the league meeting. O'Brien's attendance made the Cardinals a charter member of the new league.

== In the NFL ==
In 1920, O'Brien lured great halfback John "Paddy" Driscoll to the Cardinals for $3,000 a year, a sum considered outlandish at the time. The following year, he moved the team's home games to Comiskey Park and the team officially became the Chicago Cardinals, so that they would not be confused with a new NFL franchise, the Racine Legion from Racine, Wisconsin.

That same year, in 1920, with the Chicago Tigers and Cardinals competing for the same fan dollar, O’Brien offered—and the Tigers’ boss Guil Falcon agreed—to play for the right to represent the city of Chicago in the APFA. The winner would remain as the city's only professional team; the loser would fold operations. Driscoll scored the game's only touchdown on a 40-yard run and the Cardinals won 6–3. As promised, the Tigers dropped out of competition, becoming the first NFL/APFA team to fold and finished the season with a 2–5–1 record.

In 1921, George Halas, owner of the Decatur Staleys, requested permission from the NFL and from O'Brien to move his team to Chicago. Although the Cardinals win over the Tigers gave O'Brien the right to block any professional team from settling in Chicago, O'Brien approved the request for unknown reasons. With O'Brien's and NFL approval, Halas renamed his team the Chicago Staleys, changing the name again to the Chicago Bears in 1922. This move would come back to haunt the Cardinals. The Bears quickly replaced the Cardinals as Chicago's favorite team. After years of futile attempts to compete with the Bears, the Cardinals moved to St. Louis in 1960.

== 1925 Championship ==
O'Brien presided over the Cardinals' first NFL title in 1925. However, it still carries controversy. On December 6, 1925, the Pottsville Maroons defeated the Cardinals, 21–7, to establish the best record in the league and seemed to all but officially clinch the NFL championship. NFL President Joseph Carr then suspended the Maroons for playing a team of University of Notre Dame All-Stars in Philadelphia (and winning 9–7) on the same day the Frankford Yellow Jackets were scheduled to play a game in Philadelphia, violating Frankford's franchise rights. Pottsville was unable to complete its 1925 schedule because of the suspension and was stripped of their title. Chicago, with the second-best record in the league, was declared the 1925 champion by default. Two of Chicago's games against the Hammond Pros and Milwaukee Badgers were also not played because the Pros disbanded and the Badgers were forced out of the league for using high school players.

Although the NFL attempted to officially award the 1925 NFL championship to the Cardinals, they refused the title. At the time, O'Brien felt his team did not deserve it over a team which had beaten them fairly, and thus the 1925 championship was never officially awarded to anyone.

== Selling the Cards and legacy ==
After running the Cardinals for 28 years, O'Brien sold the team to Chicago physician David Jones in 1929 for $25,000.

Despite his accomplishments as a pioneer and promoter for the early years of professional football, O'Brien has never been a finalist, let alone inducted in the Pro Football Hall of Fame. In 2022, he was named one of the 10 inaugural members for the Football Learning Academy's Hall of Honor, which looks to acknowledge icons not currently inducted in the hall.
