= David Jones (Cardinals owner) =

American physician

- Born: David Jamison Jones; October 29, 1883; Johnstown, Pennsylvania, U.S.
- Died: July 28, 1966 (aged 82); Chicago, Illinois, U.S.
- Occupations: Owner, Chicago Cardinals (1929–1933)
- Spouse: Elsa Krueger (m. 1914)

David Jamison Jones (October 29, 1883 – July 28, 1966) was an American physician who became the second owner of the National Football League (NFL)'s Chicago Cardinals. He also owned a considerable number of shares in the Chicago Cubs baseball team.

Jones was born in Johnstown, Pennsylvania, the son of Welsh immigrant John Jones and the English-born Emma Terill Jones.

In 1929, Jones bought the Cardinals from the team's founder, Chris O'Brien for $12,000. O'Brien sold the team after growing weary from a combination of losses, apathetic fans, and the popularity of the northside's Chicago Bears.

In his first year of ownership, Jones coaxed Ernie Nevers, a future member of the Pro Football Hall of Fame, out of retirement to become the team's player-coach. In 1929, Nevers scored an NFL-record 40 points on six touchdowns and four extra points in an historic 40–6 victory over the cross-town Bears on Thanksgiving Day. However Jones soon found that not even having a great player like Nevers in the line-up could bring success to the Cardinals. In 1930, the team finished in the middle of the standings with a mediocre record of 5–6–2. A year later the team posted a 5–4 record.

One night in 1932, Jones and his wife, Elsa, were guests at an informal dinner party aboard Charles W. Bidwill's luxurious power-cruising yacht. Bidwill, a lawyer and the vice president of the Chicago Bears, spoke with Jones that night. Inevitably, the conversation turned to pro football, with Jones complaining of the poor state of his team. Half jokingly, Charles' wife, Violet, asked Jones, "Why don't you sell the Cardinals to Charley?" Jones replied that he would sell anything he owned if the price was right. Bidwill soon turned to Jones and the two began to discuss an offer. Bidwill would go on to buy the Cardinals from Jones for $50,000. Bidwill handed Jones a down payment of $2,000 to seal the deal and the two men shook hands. The sale was not announced until 1933 to allow Bidwill time to dispose of his stock in the Chicago Bears.

Jones died at Augustana Hospital in Chicago of heart trouble, aged 82.

== Additional sources ==
- Carroll, Bob; Braunwart, Bob (1981). "Blue Shirt Charlies Big Red Dream" (PDF). Coffin Corner. 3 (4). Professional Football Researchers Association: 1–2. Archived from the original (PDF) on November 27, 2010.
- "Chicago Cardinals History". Chicago Cardinals Online.
- "Chicago Cardinals". Sports Encyclopedia.com.
- "Arizona Cardinals History". Arizona Cardinals. Archived from the original on November 5, 2012.
