= Charley Trippi =

American football player (1921–2022)

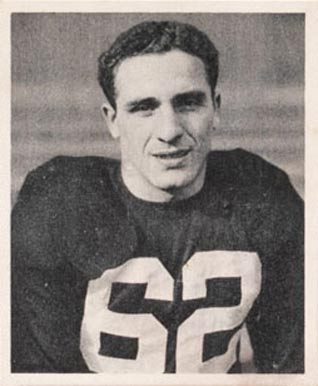
- Trippi, c. 1948

No. 62, 2
- Positions: Halfback, quarterback, punter

Personal information
- Born: December 14, 1921; Pittston, Pennsylvania, U.S.
- Died: October 19, 2022 (aged 100); Athens, Georgia, U.S.
- Listed height: 6 ft 0 in (1.83 m)
- Listed weight: 186 lb (84 kg)

Career information
- High school: Pittston; La Salle Academy (New York City, New York)
- College: Georgia (1942, 1945—1946)
- NFL draft: 1945: 1st round, 1st overall pick

Career history

Playing
- Chicago Cardinals (1947–1955)

Coaching
- Chicago Cardinals (1956–1957) Assistant coach; St. Louis Cardinals (1963–1965) Offensive backs coach

Awards and highlights
- NFL champion (1947); First-team All-Pro (1948); Second-team All-Pro (1947); 2× Pro Bowl (1952, 1953); NFL 1940s All-Decade Team; Arizona Cardinals Ring of Honor; National champion (1942); Maxwell Award (1946); SEC Player of the Year (1946); Unanimous All-American (1946); 2× First-team All-SEC (1945, 1946); Georgia Bulldogs No. 62 retired

Career NFL statistics
- Rushing yards: 3,506
- Rushing average: 5.1
- Passing yards: 2,547
- TD–INT: 16–31
- Receptions / Receiving yards: 130 / 1,321
- Punting yards / average: 7,907 / 40.3
- Return yards: 2,321
- Total touchdowns: 37 (Note: 23 rushing, 11 receiving, 2 return and 1 interception return)
- Stats at Pro Football Reference
- Pro Football Hall of Fame
- College Football Hall of Fame

Charles Louis Trippi (December 14, 1921 – October 19, 2022) was an American professional football player for the Chicago Cardinals of the National Football League (NFL) from 1947 to 1955. Although primarily a halfback, his versatility allowed him to fill a multitude of roles over his career, including quarterback, safety, punter, and return specialist. A "quintuple-threat", Trippi was adept at running, catching, passing, punting, and defense.

Trippi attended the University of Georgia, where he played college football for the Georgia Bulldogs from 1942 to 1946, with an interlude in 1944 while serving in the military during World War II. As a sophomore, he guided Georgia to victory in the 1943 Rose Bowl and was named the game's most valuable player. As a senior in 1946, he won the Maxwell Award as the nation's most outstanding college football player, was named the Southeastern Conference's player of the year, and earned first-team unanimous All-America recognition.

Drafted first overall by the Cardinals as a "future pick" in the 1945 NFL draft, Trippi was also pursued by the New York Yankees of the All-America Football Conference (AAFC) as well as multiple professional baseball teams. He ultimately signed a record $100,000 contract with the Cardinals. As a rookie, Trippi led Chicago's "Million Dollar Backfield" to victory in the 1947 NFL Championship Game. By the time he retired he had compiled the most yards of total offense by a player in NFL history. Trippi was inducted into the College Football Hall of Fame in 1959 and the Pro Football Hall of Fame in 1968.

== Early life ==
Charles Louis Trippi was born to an Italian immigrant father on December 14, 1921, in Pittston, Pennsylvania, a coal-mining community. Seeking to avoid the dangers of a life mining coal like his father, Trippi turned to sports. He attended Pittston High School and began his football career as a tailback for the school's football team. He also played semi-professional baseball while in high school.

== College career ==
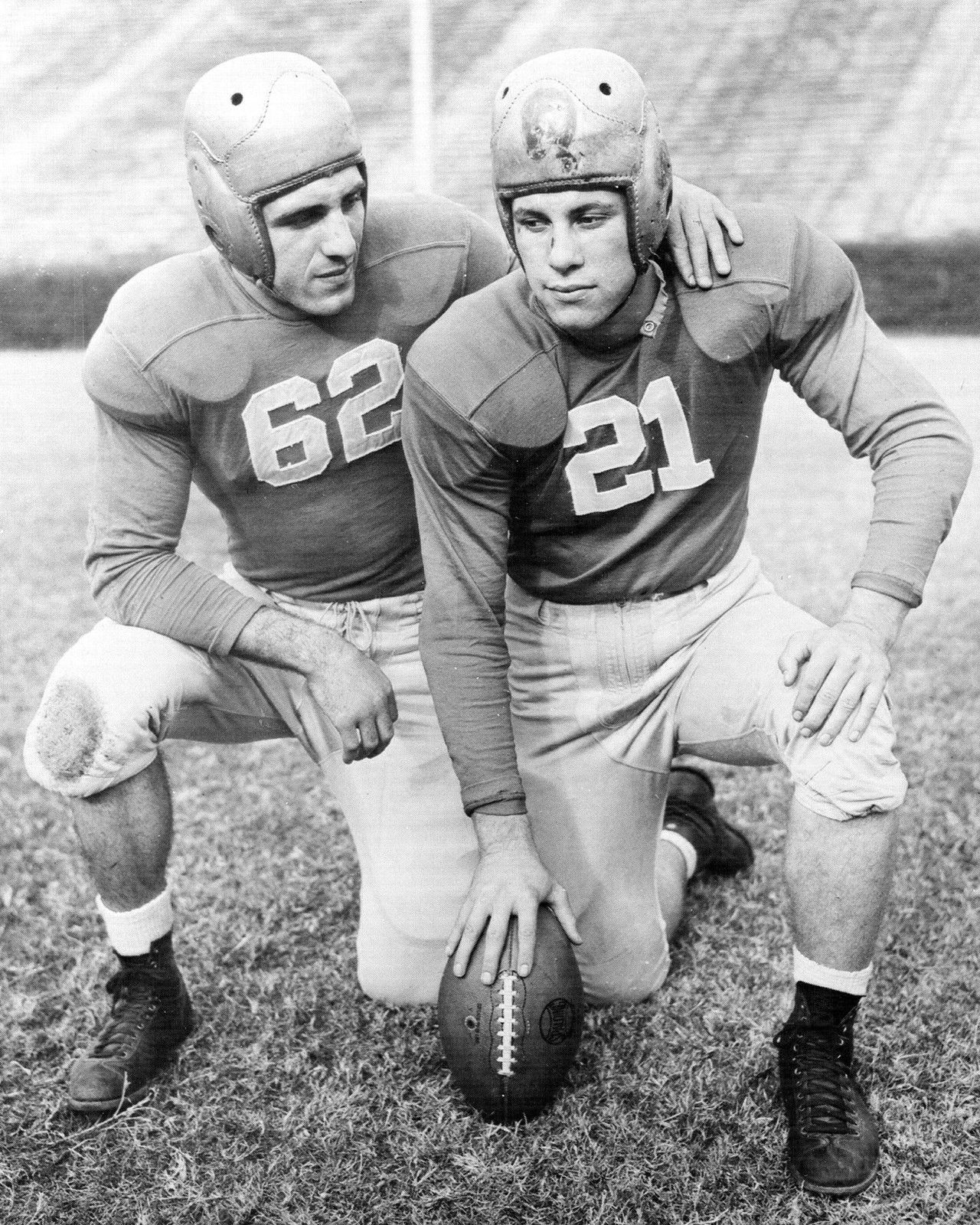
Trippi (left) and University of Georgia teammate Frank Sinkwich, c. 1942–43

=== 1942–1943 ===
Considered undersized at 160 pounds (73 kg), Trippi was turned down by four colleges before being recruited to play football for the University of Georgia by Georgia alum Harold "War Eagle" Ketron. He was given a scholarship and played for the Bulldogs varsity team from 1942 to 1946, with an interlude in 1944 due to World War II. As a sophomore in 1942, he played alongside that season's Heisman Trophy winner Frank Sinkwich. That year, Trippi and Sinkwich led Georgia to a 75–0 win over rival Florida, a game in which Trippi threw a touchdown pass to end George Poschner, scored two rushing touchdowns, and on defense returned an interception for a touchdown. Georgia finished the season with a record of 11–1 and was named the consensus national champion. Trippi then guided Georgia to a 9–0 victory over UCLA in the 1943 Rose Bowl, in which he carried 27 times for 115 yards and also handled passing and punting duties. He was retroactively named the game's most valuable player when the award was created in 1953.

=== Military service ===
Trippi's college career was interrupted by World War II, causing him to miss the 1943 and 1944 seasons and all but six games in 1945. He played for the 1944 Third Air Force Gremlins football team and was selected as a first-team back on the Associated Press' 1944 Service All-America team. While in the service in 1945, he was drafted first overall by the Chicago Cardinals of the National Football League as a future pick; per an agreement with Cardinals owner Charles Bidwill, Trippi was allowed to return to Georgia after his time in the military.

=== 1945–1946 ===
Despite missing Georgia's first five games of the 1945 season, Trippi was named a first-team All-Southeastern Conference back by both the Associated Press (AP) and United Press International (UPI). He threw a 54-yard touchdown pass and returned a punt 69 yards for a touchdown in Georgia's 20–6 win over Tulsa in the Oil Bowl on New Year's Day. In 1946, Trippi led Georgia to its first undefeated season. Against rival Georgia Tech in the final game of that year, Trippi compiled 544 combined yards rushing, passing, and returning kicks, and scored three touchdowns in Georgia's 35–7 victory. Georgia then defeated North Carolina 20–10 in the Sugar Bowl, where Trippi carried 14 times for 54 yards and threw a 67-yard touchdown pass to end Dan Edwards. After the season, Trippi was given the Maxwell Award as the most outstanding college player in the nation, the Walter Camp Memorial Trophy as the nation's best back, and was a unanimous choice for the All-America team. He finished as runner-up in Heisman Trophy voting behind winner Glenn Davis of Army.

=== College all-star games ===
Due to relaxed regulations during World War II, Trippi holds the unusual distinction of participating in the Chicago College All-Star Game a record five times: twice with Georgia, twice in the military, and once with the Cardinals. He was named the Most Valuable Player of the game in 1945. It was at the Chicago College All-Star Game that Bidwell decided he would draft Trippi first overall, as "Card-Pitt" was winless in 1944 and in need of a play-maker. "He said, 'I'm gonna get ya,'" Trippi recalled. "He wanted me to play for him, and I said, 'All you've got to do is draft me and I'm ready.'"

== Baseball ==
In addition to football, Trippi was highly sought after for his baseball skills. As a senior on Georgia's baseball team in 1946, he recorded a batting average of .475 and hit 11 home runs in 30 games while playing as a shortstop and outfielder. In 1947, Trippi played one season of minor league baseball with the Southern Association's Atlanta Crackers. He recorded a batting average of .334 through 106 games while drawing large crowds.

Multiple Major League Baseball teams attempted to sign him, including the New York Yankees, Boston Red Sox, Boston Braves, and Philadelphia Phillies, but those deals fell through when he joined the NFL. Between NFL seasons in 1948 and 1949, Trippi served as Georgia's baseball coach, compiling a 34–18 win–loss record.

== Professional football career ==
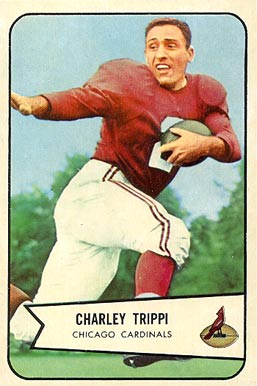
Trippi on a 1954 football card

Trippi was a major part in the battling between the NFL and All-America Football Conference (AAFC). The 26-year-old rookie had plenty of leverage as a star commodity, and so weighed his options: the Cardinals and the AAFC's New York Yankees. The Yankees were sure they had signed Trippi to a joint deal that included a contract with the Yankees of MLB, but Cardinals owner Charles Bidwill signed Trippi to a four-year contract worth an unprecedented $100,000 along with a first-year bonus of $25,000. The contract was considered the most lucrative in pro football history. Trippi felt the NFL was more established and stable, and Bidwill had offered him job security.

Trippi's addition completed Bidwill's "Dream Backfield". Although Bidwill did not live to see it, Trippi became the game breaker in a talented corps that included Paul Christman, Pat Harder, Marshall Goldberg and, later, Elmer Angsman. Trippi served a multitude of roles for the Cardinals as a rookie: in 11 games, he rushed 83 times for 401 yards, caught 23 passes for 240 yards, averaged 43.4 yards on 13 punts, returned eight punts for 181 yards and 15 kickoffs for 321 yards, and on defense returned an interception 59 yards for a touchdown. The Cardinals compiled nine wins and three losses and faced the Philadelphia Eagles in the 1947 NFL Championship Game, which the Cardinals won 28–21 largely due to a spectacular all-around performance by Trippi. Playing on an icy field in Chicago, Trippi wore basketball shoes for better traction and totaled 206 yards, including 102 yards with two punt returns. He scored touchdowns on a 44-yard run and a 75-yard punt return. During the punt return, he twice escaped an encirclement of tacklers and fell to his knees near midfield before cutting to the outside and sprinting for the score. Trippi was named to the 1947 All-Pro second-team backfield by the United Press.

Trippi led the NFL in all-purpose yards in both 1948 and 1949, compiling 1,485 and 1,552 respectively. His 5.4 rushing yards per carry in 1948 also led the league, as did his two punt return touchdowns. He had a 45-yard punt return touchdown against the Green Bay Packers and later returned a punt 67 yards for a touchdown against the Pittsburgh Steelers. Trippi was a first-team All-Pro selection for 1948 by the AP, UPI, New York Daily News, and the Sporting News, among others. The Cardinals returned to the championship game in 1948, and this time were shutout by the Eagles for a 7–0 loss. Trippi was held to nine carries for only 26 yards during the game, which was played in a heavy snowstorm. Trippi saw heavy use as a receiver in 1949; in addition to rushing for 554 yards, he led the Cardinals in receptions (32) and receiving touchdowns (six) and was second on the team with 412 receiving yards.

After playing as a left halfback for his first four seasons, Trippi switched to quarterback during 1951 and 1952. On December 15, 1951, on frozen turf in Wrigley Field, Trippi completed nine passes for 106 yards and carried 11 times for 145 yards, accounting for three touchdowns as the Cardinals defeated the Bears 24–14. Following the 1952 season, he was invited to the Pro Bowl as a backup quarterback for the American Conference. Trippi moved back to offensive halfback for one season and again was invited to the Pro Bowl. He then switched over to play defense in 1954, recording three pass interceptions as a defensive back. He also became the Cardinals' primary punter for 1953 and 1954, and had a career punting average of over 40 yards per punt. His career essentially ended in the 1955 preseason when he was tackled by John Henry Johnson of the San Francisco 49ers, which left Trippi with a smashed nose, a concussion, and a protruding bone behind his eye that gave him double vision. He appeared in only five games that season and did not record any statistics on offense. Trippi retired on December 13, 1955, a day before his 33rd birthday. At the time, his 6,053 yards of total offense (3,506 rushing, 2,547 passing, and 1,321 receiving) was the most by a player in NFL history, and he had compiled the fourth-most all-purpose yards of any player (7,148). He also set a franchise record with 864 punt return yards and averaged 13.7 yards per return.

Hall of Famer Art Donovan tells this story from late in Trippi's career: "Earlier in the season, the Bears had nearly killed Charlie Trippi, a very tough halfback. The guy who did it to him was Ed Sprinkle.... Sprinkle sucker-punched Trippi and shattered his jaw. He required a whole series of bone grafting. Then next season, Trippi broke Sprinkle's jaw. What goes round comes round."

== NFL career statistics ==
Legend
	Won the NFL championship
	Led the league
**Bold**	Career high

=== Regular season ===
Year	Team	Games		Rushing					Receiving					Punting			
Year	Team	GP	GS	Att	Yds	Avg	Lng	TD	Rec	Yds	Avg	Lng	TD	Pnt	Yds	Y/P	Lng
1947	CRD	11	9	83	401	4.8	41	2	23	240	10.4	**62**	0	0	0	0.0	0
1948	CRD	12	11	**128**	**690**	5.4	50	**6**	22	228	10.4	33	2	13	564	43.4	56
1949	CRD	12	12	112	553	4.9	55	3	**34**	**412**	12.1	44	**6**	8	292	36.5	46
1950	CRD	12	11	99	426	4.3	22	3	32	270	8.4	28	1	2	94	**47.0**	56
1951	CRD	12	7	78	501	6.4	32	4	0	0	0.0	0	0	12	446	37.2	48
1952	CRD	11	10	72	350	4.9	**59**	4	5	66	**13.2**	21	0	16	588	36.8	47
1953	CRD	12	11	97	433	4.5	21	0	11	87	7.9	21	2	54	**2,314**	42.9	**63**
1954	CRD	12	5	18	152	**8.4**	57	1	3	18	6.0	7	0	**59**	2,308	39.1	62
1955	CRD	5	0	0	0	0.0	0	0	0	0	0.0	0	0	32	1,301	40.7	53
		99	76	687	3,506	5.1	59	23	130	1,321	10.2	62	11	196	7,907	40.3	63

=== Playoffs ===
Year	Team	Games		Rushing					Receiving				
Year	Team	GP	GS	Att	Yds	Avg	Lng	TD	Rec	Yds	Avg	Lng	TD
1947	CRD	1	0	**11**	**84**	**7.6**	**44**	**1**	**1**	**20**	**20.0**	**20**	0
1948	CRD	1	1	9	26	2.9	6	0	0	0	0.0	0	0
		2	1	20	110	5.5	44	1	1	20	20.0	20	0

== Later life and honors ==
After he ended his playing career, Trippi served as an assistant coach with the Cardinals from 1957 to 1965, mostly coaching the offensive backfield. He later took up a business in real estate. Trippi was inducted into the College Football Hall of Fame in 1959; the Georgia Sports Hall of Fame in 1965; and the Pro Football Hall of Fame and Pennsylvania Sports Hall of Fame in 1968. He is the only player in the Pro Hall of Fame to have accumulated at least 1,000 yards each receiving, passing, and rushing. In 2007, he was ranked 20th on ESPN's list of the top 25 players in college football history. The football stadium at Pittston Area High School is named Charley Trippi Stadium in his honor. In 1969, Trippi was named to the NFL's 1940s All-Decade Team, compiled to honor the best players of the decade. At the time of his death, Trippi was the oldest living member of the Pro Football Hall of Fame, as well as the oldest living No. 1 NFL draft pick.

On December 14, 2021, Trippi turned 100, becoming the second Pro Football Hall of Famer to reach that milestone, after Clarence "Ace" Parker.

Trippi was one of only four University of Georgia football players to have his jersey number retired. His No. 62 was retired in 1947.

The south lower stands of Sanford Stadium has 61 rows. Row 61 is actually numbered row 62 in Trippi's honor.

== Personal life ==
Trippi's first wife, Virginia (née Davis), died in 1971. He remarried to Peggy (née McNiven). He had three children from his first marriage and three stepchildren from his second marriage.

Trippi died on October 19, 2022, in Athens, Georgia, at the age of 100. He was the last surviving member of the National Football League 1940's All Decade Team and the last living member of the Cardinals 1947 championship team.
