= Charles Bidwill =

American football executive (1895–1947)

Personal information
- Born: September 16, 1895; Chicago, Illinois, U.S.
- Died: April 19, 1947 (aged 51); Chicago, Illinois, U.S.

Career information
- High school: St. Ignatius College (Chicago, Illinois)
- College: Loyola University Chicago

Career history
- Chicago Bears (1931–1933) Minority owner; Chicago Cardinals (1933–1947) Owner (Note: Co-owner of the Card-Pitt in 1944.)

Awards and highlights
- Arizona Cardinals Ring of Honor; Chicagoland Sports Hall of Fame
- Executive profile at Pro Football Reference
- Pro Football Hall of Fame

Charles W. "Charley" Bidwill Sr. (September 16, 1895 – April 19, 1947) was an American businessman. He was the owner of the Chicago Cardinals of the National Football League (NFL). He owned the team for 14 seasons, the NFL campaigns running from 1933 through 1946. Bidwill was inducted into the Pro Football Hall of Fame in 1967.

== Early life ==
Bidwill was the son of Chicago 9th Ward Alderman Joseph Edward Bidwill and Mary Anne Sullivan. His eldest brother Joseph Edward Bidwill Jr. was a clerk of the Chicago Circuit Court and his younger brother Arthur J. Bidwill was a Republican State Senator. Loretta Mary Bidwill was his sister (1888–1973).

== Before the Cardinals ==
Prior to his ownership of the Cardinals, Bidwill was a successful businessman and wealthy lawyer in Chicago, with ties to organized crime boss Al Capone. He was owner of a racing stable, the president of the Chicago Stadium Operating Company and owner of a printing company. Bidwill's only physical participation in athletics came only during his time at St. Ignatius High School and Loyola University.

After graduation in 1916, he began his law practice, serving as assistant prosecutor for Chicago and corporation counsel. As a businessman, Bidwill was often referred to as "Blue Shirt Charlie" because he sometimes favored a blue shirt and high boots instead of the traditional white shirt and businessman's shoes.

Bidwill was a partial owner of the Chicago Bears franchise, after he helped George Halas buy Edward "Dutch" Sternaman's share of the team back in 1933. According to Halas' account in his 1967 book, That's The Way the Ball Bounces, Bidwill purchased team stocks for $5,000: "From this desperate situation, I was rescued by the joint efforts of my mother and my good friend Charley Bidwill. Mother bought $5,000 worth of stock from her savings, Bidwill purchased $5,000 in stock and also arranged a bank loan for the remaining $5,000 needed to pay off Sternaman." In addition to that, he was also a partial owner of the Chicago Bruins professional basketball team alongside George Halas for both the original American Basketball League and the U.S.A.'s National Basketball League, the latter of which would eventually merged with the Basketball Association of America to become the present-day National Basketball Association.

== Chicago Cardinals ==
=== Purchase ===
One night in 1932, David Jones, the then-owner of the Cardinals, and his wife were guests at an informal dinner party aboard Bidwill's luxurious power-cruising yacht, The Ren-Mar. Bidwill, then a vice president of the Chicago Bears, spoke with Jones that night and the conversation turned to pro football, with Jones complaining of the poor state of his team. Half-jokingly, Bidwill's wife, Violet, asked Jones, "Why don't you sell the Cardinals to Charley?" Jones replied that he would sell anything he owned if the price was right. Bidwill soon turned to Jones and the two began to discuss an offer. Bidwill went on to buy the Cardinals from Jones for $50,000. Bidwill handed Jones a down payment of $2,000 and the two men shook hands. The sale was not announced until 1933 to allow Bidwill time to dispose of his stock in the Bears. It was well known that Bidwill would have much preferred to buy the Bears, but George Halas refused to sell.

=== As the owner ===
In 1940 he tried but failed to buy the Detroit Lions. He then hired Jimmy Conzelman as coach, who later quit as coach to work for the St. Louis Browns.

=== World War II years ===
In 1944, due to World War II, many players were serving in the United States military, leaving a league-wide shortage of players. As a result, the Cardinals and the Pittsburgh Steelers merged their teams for the season. The team's name Card-Pitt was quickly dubbed the "Carpets" by detractors, as "every team in the league walks over them". The team lost ten straight to post an 0–10 record.

=== The AAFC ===
After the war the AAFC placed a team in Chicago, the Rockets, which publicly pushed for the Cardinals to leave town. In 1947 Bidwill outbid the Rockets for the rights to All-American Charley Trippi, signing him to a then record $100,000 contract. Trippi was the final piece of what Bidwill called his "Dream Backfield" of Paul Christman, Pat Harder, Marshall Goldberg, Elmer Angsman, and Trippi. They led the Cardinals to their first (and, to date, only) undisputed NFL championship in 1947.

== Death and legacy ==
Bidwill died of pneumonia in April 1947, shortly after signing Trippi. His widow Violet inherited the team and operated it until her death in early 1962. During her tenure as the Cardinals owner, she and her second husband, Walter Wolfner, relocated the franchise to St. Louis in 1960. Following her death, she left the team to her adopted sons from her first marriage, Charles Jr. and Bill. He is a member of the Chicagoland Sports Hall of Fame and was inducted into the Pro Football Hall of Fame in 1967.

Bill Bidwill bought his elder brother's share in 1972. During Bill's time as owner, the team relocated once more, to Phoenix, Arizona, in 1988, and since 1994 have been known as the Arizona Cardinals. He remained sole owner until his death in 2019. His son Michael Bidwill, who had been team president and operating head of the franchise since 2007, inherited the team.

Of the current NFL franchises as of 2025, only the Bears (Halas/McCaskey, since 1921), and New York Giants (Mara family, since 1925) have been in the hands of one family longer than the Cardinals; the Pittsburgh Steelers (Rooney family) were also founded in 1933, when the Bidwells took over Cardinals control. The 2008 championship game was between the Bidwells and Rooneys' clubs.
