= Violet Bidwill Wolfner =

American sports team owner

- Violet Bidwill Wolfner
- Born: Violet Fults; January 10, 1900; Red Bud, Illinois, U.S.
- Died: January 29, 1962 (aged 62); Miami Beach, Florida, U.S.
- Burial place: Queen of Heaven Cemetery, Hillside, Illinois
- Occupation: Owner of the Chicago / St. Louis Cardinals
- Years active: 1947–1962
- Spouses: Charles Bidwill, Sr. (died 1947) Walter H.S. Wolfner (m. 1949)
- Children: 2 adopted (Bill, Charles Jr.)

Violet Fults Bidwill Wolfner (née Violet Fults; January 10, 1900 – January 29, 1962) was the owner of the Chicago / St. Louis Cardinals of the National Football League (NFL) for over 14 years, from 1947 until her death in early 1962. She inherited the team in April 1947, following the death of her husband Charles Bidwill Sr., who purchased the team in 1933. She was the first woman to become principal owner of an NFL team.

== Biography ==
=== Early life ===
Wolfner was born Violet Fults in Red Bud, Illinois, the daughter of Alonzo Fults, of German and Irish descent, and Mary Ann "Mamie" Vogel, of German descent. She had an older sister, Imelda. Her father died in 1906 and her mother worked as a waitress.

=== Chicago Cardinals ===
On April 19, 1947, Violet's husband Charley Bidwill died, leaving ownership of the Chicago Cardinals to her.

Bidwill's first season as owner saw the Cardinals, led by the "Dream Backfield" of Paul Christman, Pat Harder, Marshall Goldberg, and Charley Trippi, defeat the Philadelphia Eagles for the franchise's first undisputed league championship. They made it to the league title game again in 1948, but lost to the Eagles in a rematch in the snow. The Cardinals had only four more .500 seasons under her ownership.

Bidwill married St. Louis businessman Walter H.S. Wolfner (1898–1971) in September 1949, thereafter becoming known as Violet Bidwill Wolfner. Her new husband, a St. Louis native and alumnus of Washington University, quickly stepped into the role of managing director of the football club.

When the Bears of George Halas slowly began becoming the favorite of the Chicago area, the Wolfners moved the team to St. Louis after the 1959 season.

=== Death ===
Wolfner died in a physician's office in Miami Beach, Florida, on January 29, 1962, and is buried at Queen of Heaven Cemetery in Hillside, Illinois. In her will, she split her more than 80% interest in the Cardinals between her adopted sons from her first marriage, Charles "Stormy" Bidwill Jr. and Bill Bidwill, the club president and vice-president.

The will was contested in court by her second husband Walter Wolfner, managing director of the football team. In February 1963 the Illinois Supreme Court upheld the will, in favor of the sons, Bill and Stormy.

The sons co-owned the team for a decade, until Bill purchased his brother's share of the team in 1972. 16 years after Bill took over the franchise in full, the team made another relocation to Phoenix, Arizona in 1988 as the Phoenix Cardinals and have based there since, then becoming the Arizona Cardinals in 1994.

Wolfner's wardrobe was auctioned off in November 1963. Among the 25,000 items were 1,000 coats and dresses and 1,500 pairs of shoes, many never worn; the auction fetched more than $40,000.

Sporting positions
Preceded by Charles Bidwill	Chicago Cardinals principal owner 1947–1962	Succeeded by Charles Bidwill Jr. Bill Bidwill
