= Charles Bidwill Jr. =

American businessman (1928–2025)

Charles W. Bidwill Jr.
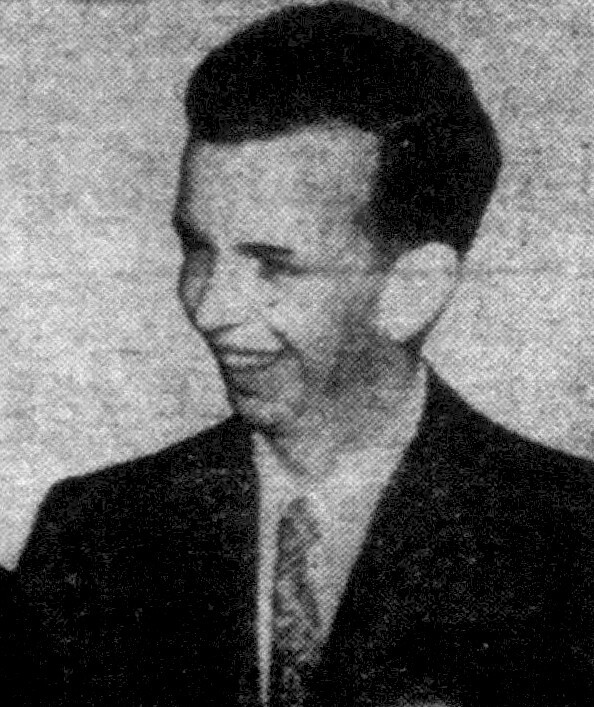
- Bidwill Jr. in 1953
- Born: June 9, 1928; Chicago, Illinois, U.S.
- Died: November 3, 2025 (aged 97); Northfield, Illinois, U.S.
- Education: Georgetown University
- Occupation: Businessman
- Years active: 1962–2025
- Known for: Co-owner of St. Louis Cardinals (NFL); President of Sportsman’s Park
- Children: 5
- Parent(s): Charles Bidwill; Violet Bidwill

Charles W. "Stormy" Bidwill Jr. (June 9, 1928 – November 3, 2025) was an American businessman who was the president of the now defunct Sportsman's Park horse track in Cicero, Illinois, from 1967 to 1995, and co-owner of the National Football League (NFL)'s Chicago and St. Louis Cardinals franchise with his younger brother, Bill Bidwill, from 1962 to 1972.

== Life and career ==
=== Early life and education ===
Charles Jr. and his younger brother Bill were adopted by Charles and Violet Bidwill, the owners of the then-Chicago Cardinals. Bidwill attended Georgetown University where he obtained a law degree. He was given the nickname “Stormy” when he was one year old after an uncle observed him having a temper tantrum.

=== Football and horse racing ===
Prior to the 1960 season, Violet Bidwill moved the Cardinals to St. Louis, Missouri, and Charles Jr. and Bill inherited the team after their mother's sudden death in 1962. In addition to the football team, the brothers inherited other business interests, including Sportsman's Park. Charles Jr. was named president of Sportsman's Park in 1967 and remained in Chicago to run the horse track while his brother Bill lived in St. Louis and essentially ran the football team.

Over the years, the relationship between the Bidwill brothers became strained. The animosity reached a climax when Stormy forced the dismissal of Cardinals head coach Charley Winner against Bill's wishes after a 1970 campaign in which the ballclub squandered an opportunity to win the NFC East title by losing its last three regular-season games. Stormy eventually sold his share of the Cardinals to Bill for $6,500,000 in 1972.

=== Other business interests ===
Along with Sportsman's Park, Bidwill owned a beer distributorship and had financial interests in four Florida dog tracks. For many years, he was the largest stockholder in Churchill Downs and a member of its board of directors.

=== Death ===
Bidwill's grave at Sacred Heart Cemetery

Bidwill died in Northfield, Illinois, on November 3, 2025, at the age of 97, and was buried at Sacred Heart Cemetery in Northbrook.

Sporting positions
Preceded by Violet Bidwill Wolfner	St. Louis Cardinals principal owner 1962–1972; Served alongside: Bill Bidwill	Succeeded by Bill Bidwill
