= Chicago Cardinals =

Former American football team

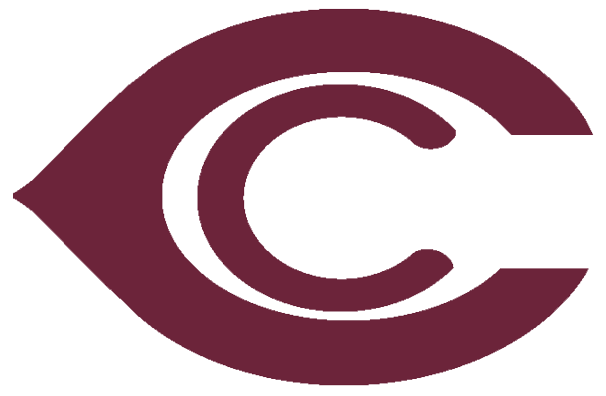
Logo
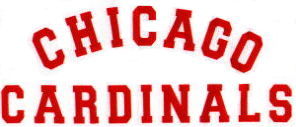
Wordmark

General information
- Founded: 1898
- Folded: 1959
- Headquartered: Chicago, Illinois
- Colors: Cardinal red, white, black

Personnel
- Owners: Chris O'Brien (1898–1929); David Jones (1929–1932); Charles Bidwill (1932–1947); Violet Bidwill (1947–1961)

Team history
- Morgan Athletic Club (1898); Racine Normals (1899–1900); Racine (Street) Cardinals (1901–1905, 1913–1917, 1919–1921); Suspended operations (1906–1912, 1918); Chicago Cardinals (1922–1959); Card-Pitt (1944); St. Louis Cardinals (1960–1987); Phoenix Cardinals (1988–1993); Arizona Cardinals (1994–present)

Home fields
- Normal Park (1900–1921, 1926–1928); Comiskey Park (1922–1925, 1929–1930, 1940–1958); Wrigley Field (1931–1939); Soldier Field (1959, 4 games); Metropolitan Stadium (1959, 2 games)

League / conference affiliations
- National Football League (1920–1959): Western Division (1933–1949); American Conference (1950–1952); Eastern Conference (1953–1959)

Championships
- League championships: 2: NFL championships (pre-1970 AFL–NFL merger) (2) 1925, 1947
- Division championships: 2: NFL West: 1947, 1948

Playoff appearances (2)
- NFL: 1947, 1948

The professional American football team now known as the Arizona Cardinals previously played in Chicago, Illinois, as the Chicago Cardinals from 1898 to 1959 before relocating to St. Louis, Missouri, for the 1960 through 1987 seasons.

The roots of the Chicago Cardinals can be traced back to 1898, when Chris O'Brien established an amateur Chicago-based athletic team, the Morgan Athletic Club. O'Brien later moved them to Chicago's Normal Park and renamed them the Racine Normals, then adopting the maroon color from the University of Chicago uniforms.

In the 1900s, the Cardinals became part of a professional circuit in Chicago. The Racine Cardinals, along with the Chicago Bears, were founding members of the National Football League in 1920. Both teams are the only two surviving teams from that era. The Bears and the Cardinals also developed a rivalry during those NFL first years.

After some irregular campaigns during the 1950s, the Cardinals were largely overshadowed by the Bears in Chicago and almost fell into bankruptcy. After some efforts to buy the Cardinals, a group of investors including Lamar Hunt, Bud Adams, Bob Howsam and Max Winter, joined forces to form the American Football League to compete with National Football League. The Cardinals would later move to St. Louis, Missouri, beginning with the 1960 season.

== Early history ==
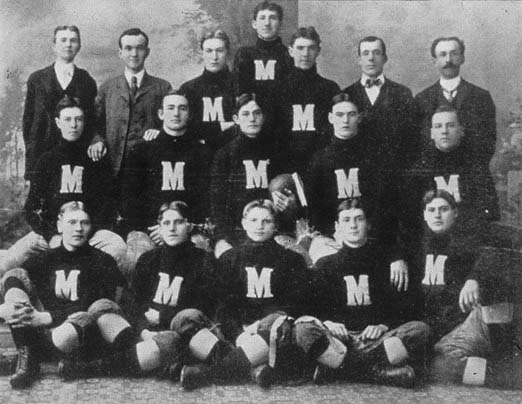
Morgan Athletic Club, established in 1898, would eventually be renamed the “Cardinals”

In 1898, Chicago painting and building contractor Chris O'Brien established an amateur Chicago-based athletic club football team named the "Morgan Athletic Club" from Morgan Park, Chicago. O'Brien later moved them to Chicago's Normal Park and renamed them the "Racine Normals", since Normal Park was located on Chicago's Racine Avenue (then suffixed as "Street"). In 1901, O'Brien bought used maroon uniforms from the University of Chicago, the colors of which had by then faded, leading O'Brien to exclaim, "That's not maroon; it's cardinal red!" It was then that the team changed its name to the "Racine Street Cardinals".

The original Racine Street Cardinals team disbanded in 1906 mostly for lack of local competition. A professional team under the same name formed in 1913, claiming the previous team as part of their history. As was the case for most professional football teams in 1918, the team was forced to suspend operations for a second time due to World War I and the outbreak of the Spanish flu pandemic. It resumed operations later in the year (one of the few teams to play that year), and has since operated continuously.

== 1920s ==
At the time of the founding of the modern National Football League, the Cardinals were part of a thriving professional football circuit based in the Chicago area. Teams such as the Decatur Staleys, Hammond Pros, Chicago Tigers and the Cardinals had formed an informal loop similar to, and generally on par with, the Ohio and New York circuits that had also emerged as top football centers prior to the league's founding.

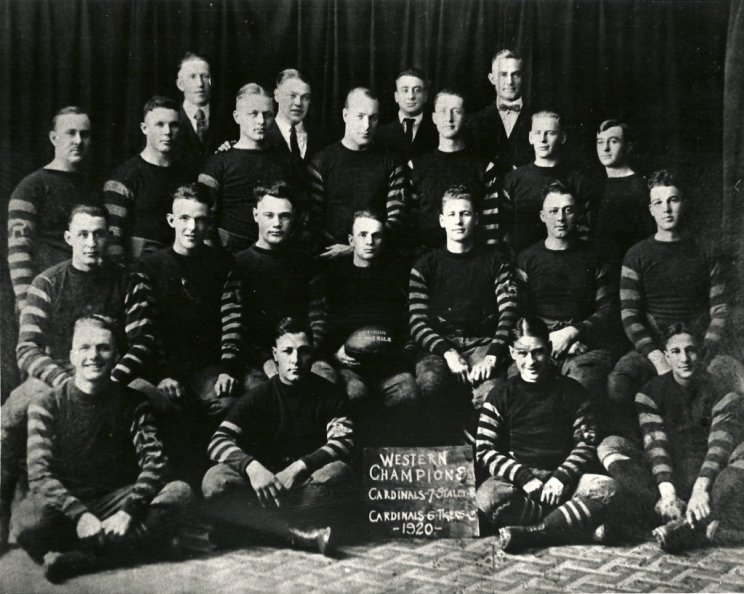
The Chicago Cardinals in 1920

In 1920, the team became a charter member of the American Professional Football Association (later renamed the National Football League (NFL) in 1922), for a franchise fee of $100. The Cardinals and the Chicago Bears (the latter founded as the Decatur Staleys before moving to Chicago in 1921 and being renamed the Chicago Staleys, then in 1922 being renamed the Chicago Bears) are the only charter members of the NFL still in existence, though the Green Bay Packers, which joined the league in 1921, existed prior to the formation of the NFL. The person keeping the minutes of the first league meeting, unfamiliar with the nuances of Chicago football, recorded the Cardinals as from Racine, Wisconsin. The team was renamed the "Chicago Cardinals" in 1922 after a team actually from Racine, Wisconsin (the Horlick-Racine Legion) entered the league. That season the team moved to Comiskey Park.

The Staleys and Cardinals played each other twice in 1920 as the Racine Cardinals and the Decatur Staleys, making their rivalry the oldest in the NFL. They split the series, with the home team winning in each. In the Cardinals' 7–6 victory over the Staleys in their first meeting of the season, each team scored a touchdown on a fumble recovery, with the Staleys failing their extra point try.

The Cardinals' defeat of the Staleys proved critical, since George Halas's Staleys went on to a 10–1–2 record overall, 5–1–2 in league play. The Akron Pros were the first ever league champions; they finished with an 8–0–3 record, 6–0–3 in league play, ending their season in a scoreless tie against the Staleys. Since the Pros merely had to tie the game in order to win the title, they could afford to play not to lose. Had the Staleys not lost to the Cardinals, they would have gone into that fateful game with an 11–0–2 record, 6–0–2 in league play. As it was, it all but assured that the Staleys/Bears and Cardinals would be intense rivals.

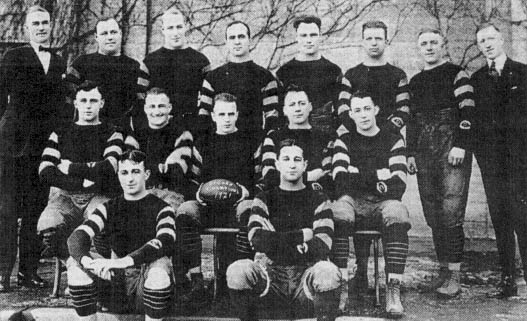
The 1921 Chicago Cardinals

The two teams played to a tie in 1921, when the Staleys won all but two games, thus the Cardinals came within 1 point of costing the Staleys a second consecutive championship in the league's first two years of existence.

In 1922, the Staleys, now renamed the Bears, went 9–3–0, losing to the Cardinals twice. The Bears still edged the Cardinals for second place in the league, but those losses dashed all hopes of the Bears repeating as champions.

In 1923 and 1924, the Bears got the better of the Cardinals all three times the two teams played. But in 1925, the Bears went 0–1–1 against the Cardinals with the tie meaning the Cardinals were only a 1/2 game in front of the Pottsville Maroons heading into their fateful 1925 showdown.

Thus, in the first six years of the NFL's existence, the Bears-Cardinals games had a direct impact on the league championship 4 times. The Bears and Cardinals each took home 1 title during that span. But the Bears nearly cost the Cardinals their title, the Cardinals nearly cost the Bears their title, and had it not been for the Cardinals' tenacity against the Bears, the Bears very well might have won two more. The Bears were a dominant team against everyone but the Cardinals in the league's early years. From 1920 to 1925, the Canton Bulldogs, champions in 1922 and 1923, beat the Bears just 2 times and no other team in the NFL defeated the Bears more than once over that entire 6-year span... except for the Cardinals. The Cardinals battled the Bears to 4–4–2 split between 1920 and 1925 and established the NFL's first rivalry.

The 1925 season ended in perhaps the greatest controversy in professional football history. In those days, there was no fixed schedule nor any playoff games. The championship was decided by winning percentage. At season's end, after losing in a Chicago snow storm to the Pottsville Maroons 21–7, the Cardinals found themselves in second place. Hoping to improve their record, they scheduled and won two hastily arranged games against weaker teams, the Milwaukee Badgers and the Hammond Pros. The ploy was within the NFL's rules at the time because of the open-ended schedule. Chicago finished the season with a record of 11–2–1. However, the league sanctioned them because a Chicago player, Art Folz, had hired four Chicago high school football players to play for the Milwaukee Badgers under assumed names to ensure a Cardinals victory.

Meanwhile, because Pottsville had played an unauthorized exhibition game in Philadelphia against the University of Notre Dame All-Stars, the Maroons were stripped of the title. The League decided not to award a championship for 1925. Later, it was offered to the Cardinals, whose owner, Chris O'Brien, refused to accept the championship title for his team. He argued that his team did not deserve to take the title over a team which had beaten them fairly. It was only after the Bidwill family bought the Cardinals in 1933 that the franchise began to claim the 1925 title as its own. (For more on the controversy, see 1925 NFL Championship controversy.)

The Chicago Cardinals were one of the few NFL teams to host African-American players in the 1920s—most notably Duke Slater. After the folding of the first American Football League after its lone season, Slater, against all odds, successfully joined the Chicago Cardinals of the National Football League.

Not only was Slater pro football's first African-American lineman, he was also one of the NFL's most outstanding linemen of his era. In 1928, he encouraged the team to sign Harold Bradley Sr., who became the NFL's second black lineman. Slater and Bradley played alongside each other in the first two games of the 1928 season. A steel plate in Bradley's leg, due to a childhood injury, contributed to Bradley ending his NFL career after only two games—the shortest among the 13 African American players who played in the NFL before World War II.

Between 1926 and 1927 a movement began among the owners of the NFL to follow the racist example of professional baseball and in 1927 every African-American player was out of the league, with the sole exception of Duke Slater. The color ban faced by Slater and other black players was not ironclad, however, and four other African-American players managed to draw salaries in the NFL during short careers interspersed from 1928 through 1933. Slater was once again the only black player in the league in 1929.

On November 28, 1929, Slater participated in an NFL record as a lineman in front of Ernie Nevers in a game in which he scored six rushing touchdowns in a 40–6 victory over the Chicago Bears. Slater played all 60 minutes of the contest, alternating between the offensive and defensive lines as well as participating on special teams.

By the time of his retirement in 1931, Slater had achieved All-Pro status a total of six times. During his NFL career Slater never missed a game because of injury, starting in a total of 96 of the 99 games he played between the AFL and NFL.

== 1930s ==
The Cardinals posted a winning record only twice in the 20 years after their 1925 championship (1931 and 1935); including 10 straight losing seasons from 1936 to 1945.

Dr. David Jones bought the team from O'Brien in 1929. In 1932 the team was purchased by Charles Bidwill, then a vice president of the Chicago Bears. The team has been under the ownership of the Bidwill family since then.

== 1940s ==
In 1944, owing to player shortages caused by World War II, the Cardinals and Pittsburgh Steelers merged for one year and were known as the "Card-Pitt", or derisively as the "Carpets" as they were winless that season. In 1945, the Cardinals snapped their long losing streak (an NFL record 29 games, dating back to the 1942 season and including their lone season as Card-Pitt) by beating the Bears 16–7. It was their only victory of the season. In 1946, the team finished 6–5 for the first winning season in eight years.

In 1947, the NFL standardized on a 12-game season. This would be the most celebrated year in Cardinals history as the team went 9–3, beating Philadelphia in the championship game 28–21 with their "Million Dollar Backfield", which included quarterback Paul Christman, halfback Charley Trippi, halfback Elmer Angsman, and fullback Pat Harder, piling up 282 rushing yards. However, Bidwill was not around to see it; he had died before the start of the season, leaving the team to his wife Violet. Prior to the season he had beaten the Chicago Rockets of the upstart All-America Football Conference for the rights to Trippi. This signing is generally acknowledged as the final piece in the championship puzzle. The next season saw the Cardinals finish 11–1 and again play in the championship game, but lost 7–0 in a rematch with the Eagles, played in a heavy snowstorm that almost completely obscured the field. This was the first NFL championship to be televised. The next year, Violet Bidwill married St. Louis businessman Walter Wolfner, and the Cardinals fell to 6–5–1.

== 1950s ==
The 1950s were a dismal period for the Cardinals, with records of 5–7 (1950), 3–9 (1951), 4–8 (1952), 1–10–1 (1953), 2–10 (1954), 4–7–1 (1955), 7–5 (1956; the best year of the decade), 3–9 (1957), 2–9–1 (1958), and 2–10 (1959). With just 33 wins in ten seasons, the Cardinals were nearly forgotten in Chicago, being completely overshadowed by the Bears. Attendance at Cardinals games was sparse. With the team almost bankrupt, the Bidwills decided to cede Chicago to the Bears and move the Cardinals to another city. However, the NFL demanded a hefty relocation fee which the Bidwills were unwilling and/or unable to pay. Needing cash, the Bidwills entertained offers from various out-of-town investors, including Lamar Hunt, Bud Adams, Bob Howsam and Max Winter. However, these negotiations came to nothing, probably because the Bidwills were only willing to sell a minority stake in the team while maintaining controlling interest.

Having failed in their separate efforts to buy the Cardinals, Hunt, Adams, Howsam and Winter joined forces to form the American Football League. Suddenly faced with a serious rival, the NFL quickly came to terms with the Bidwills, engineering a deal that sent the Cardinals to St. Louis, Missouri beginning with the 1960 season in a move which also blocked St. Louis as a potential market for the new AFL, which began play the same year. Despite the presence of a baseball team already named the St. Louis Cardinals, the football team kept its name upon relocation there, and would be referred to as "the football Cardinals" or "Gridbirds" until they departed for Arizona following the 1987 season.

== Notable players ==
=== Pro Football Hall of Famers ===
Chicago Cardinals Hall of Famers
Players
No.	Player	Position(s)	Tenure	Inducted
1	John "Paddy" Driscoll	QB; Coach	1920–1925; 1920–1922	1965
4	Ernie Nevers	FB; Coach	1929–1931; 1930–1931, 1939	1963
13	Guy Chamberlin	End & Coach	1927–1928	1965
16	Duke Slater	T	1926–1931	2020
33	Ollie Matson	RB	1952, 1954–1958	1972
62, 2	Charley Trippi	RB	1947–1955	1968
81	Dick "Night Train" Lane	CB	1954–1959	1974
—	Jim Thorpe	RB	1928	1963
Coaches and Contributors
Name		Position(s)	Tenure	Inducted
Charles Bidwill		Team Owner	1933–1947	1967
Jimmy Conzelman		Coach	1940–1942; 1946–1948	1964
Earl "Curly" Lambeau		Coach	1950–1951	1963
Joe Stydahar		Coach	1953–1954	1967

italics = played a portion of career with the Cardinals and enshrined representing another team

=== Retired numbers ===
Chicago Cardinals retired numbers
N°	Player	Position	Tenure	Retired
77	Stan Mauldin ^{1}	OT	1946–1948	
99	Marshall Goldberg	HB	1939–1943; 1946–1948	

Notes:

- ^{1} Posthumously retired.

== See also ==
- Chicago Cardinals–Toronto Argonauts exhibition game
- Ziemba, Joe (2022). Bears vs. Cardinals: The NFL's Oldest Rivalry. Jefferson: McFarland & Company, Inc., Publishers. ISBN 978-1-4766-8851-0
- Ziemba, Joe (1999). When Football Was Football: The Chicago Cardinals and the Birth of the NFL. Chicago: Triumph Books. ISBN 1-57243-317-5.
