= 1982 Philadelphia Eagles season =

NFL team season

- Owner: Leonard Tose
- General manager: Jim Murray
- Head coach: Dick Vermeil
- Home stadium: Veterans Stadium

Results
- Record: 3–6
- Division place: 13th NFC (5th NFC East)
- Playoffs: Did not qualify

The 1982 Philadelphia Eagles season was the franchise's 50th season in the National Football League (NFL). The Eagles failed to improve on their 10–6 record from 1981, and finished only 3–6 (a players' strike reduced the season to 9 games). The Eagles failed to make the playoffs for the first time since 1977.

This season would mark the end of an era under head coach Dick Vermeil. While under Vermeil the Eagles had the second most successful period of their existence up to that time.(1946-49 they would have a record of 35-12 and go to 3 consecutive championship games winning two) making the playoffs four straight seasons (1978–1981) and having a record of 54–47 in six seasons with Vermeil (1976–1982) while making the Super Bowl in 1980. Vermeil retired after the 1982 season citing burnout, but would return to coaching in 1997 with the St. Louis Rams and would lead them to a Super Bowl victory in 1999.

== Offseason ==
=== NFL draft ===
After going 10–6 and losing in the NFC Wildcard game at home to the New York Giants (9–7) in the 1981 season the Eagles would be picking 20th in the 12 rounds of the draft.

The 1982 NFL draft was the procedure by which National Football League teams selected amateur college football players. It is officially known as the NFL Annual Player Selection Meeting. The draft was held April 27–28, 1982. ESPN would cover all 12 rounds live. ESPN would then show a replay later that night.

The Philadelphia Eagles would get the 20th pick in the 12 rounds. The Eagles would draft 11 players in this year's draft.

1982 Philadelphia Eagles Draft
Round	Selection	Player	Position	College
1	20	Mike Quick	Wide receiver	North Carolina State University
2	47	Lawrence Sampleton	Tight end	University of Texas at Austin
3	78	Vyto Kab	Tight end	Penn State
4	105	Anthony Griggs	Linebacker	Ohio State
5	132	Dennis DeVaughn	Defensive back	Bishop
6	159	Curt Grieve	Wide receiver	Yale
7	190	Harvey Armstrong	Defensive tackle	Southern Methodist
8	217	Jim Fritzche	Tackle	Purdue
9	244	Tony Woodruff	Wide receiver	Fresno State
10		NO PICK		
11	301	Ron Ingram	Wide receiver	Oklahoma State
12	328	Rob Taylor	Tackle	Northwestern

== Personnel ==
=== Staff / Coaches ===
1982 Philadelphia Eagles staff
Front office: Owner – Leonard Tose; General manager – Jim Murray; Director of player personnel – Lynn Stiles; Head coaches: Head coach – Dick Vermeil; Offensive coaches: Quarterbacks – Sid Gillman; Running Backs – John Becker; Receivers – Ben Hawkins; Tight Ends – Harry Gamble; Offensive Line – Ken Iman; Offensive Line – Jerry Wampfler	Defensive coaches: Defensive Coordinator – Marion Campbell; Defensive Line – Chuck Clausen; Linebackers – George Hill; Defensive Backs – Fred Bruney; Special teams coaches: Special Teams – Harry Gamble

=== Roster ===
1982 Philadelphia Eagles roster
Quarterbacks (QB): 7 Ron Jaworski; 6 Dan Pastorini; 9 Joe Pisarcik; Running backs (RB): 30 Don Calhoun; 37 Billy Campfield; 33 Louie Giammona; 35 Perry Harrington; 20 Leroy Harris; 31 Wilbert Montgomery; Wide receivers (WR): 17 Harold Carmichael; 89 Wally Henry; 85 Melvin Hoover; 82 Mike Quick; 81 Ron Smith; 83 Tony Woodruff; Tight ends (TE): 84 Vyto Kab; 87 Lawrence Sampleton; 88 John Spagnola	Offensive linemen (OL): 63 Ron Baker G; 79 Frank Giddens T; 73 Steve Kenney G; 64 Dean Miraldi G; 50 Guy Morriss C; 62 Petey Perot G; 61 Mark Slater C; 75 Stan Walters T; Defensive linemen (DL): 96 Harvey Armstrong NT; 98 Greg Brown DE; 71 Ken Clarke NT; 78 Carl Hairston DE; 68 Dennis Harrison DE; 99 Leonard Mitchell DE	Linebackers (LB): 95 John Bunting OLB; 57 Mike Curcio OLB; 58 Anthony Griggs ILB; 55 Frank LeMaster ILB; 56 Jerry Robinson ILB; 54 Zack Valentine OLB; 51 Reggie Wilkes OLB; Defensive backs (DB): 27 Richard Blackmore CB; 46 Herm Edwards CB; 24 Ray Ellis SS; 41 Randy Logan SS; 45 Von Mansfield CB; 21 John Sciarra FS; 22 Brenard Wilson FS; 43 Roynell Young CB; Special teams (ST): 1 Tony Franklin K; 4 Max Runager P	Reserve: 25 Dennis DeVaughn CB (IR); 72 Jim Fritzsche T (IR); 12 Curt Grieve WR (IR); -- Ken Jenkins RB (IR); 97 Charles Johnson NT (IR); 34 Hubie Oliver FB (IR); 76 Jerry Sisemore T (IR); -- Steve Wagner LB (IR); Rookies in italics

== Regular season ==
The Eagles' 1982 schedule was set based on how they finished in 1981: 2nd in the NFC East. The way it was laid out, 4 of the 5 teams in the same 5-team division could end up having 10 to 14 common opponents during the season. Also, when the last regular season game was over, each team would know which teams they would play the following year. The Eagles' 1982 schedule called for:

- A home and away series vs Dallas, New York Giants, St. Louis and Washington = 8 games.
- Each of the top 4 teams in the NFC East (based on their 1981 standings) would play the 4 teams in the AFC Central = 4 games.
- Each of the 2nd- and 3rd-place teams in the NFC East (based on their 1981 standings; i.e., the Eagles and Giants) would play the 2nd- and 3rd-place teams in the NFC Central and NFC West (also based on their 1981 standings: Lions, Packers, Falcons, and Rams) = 4 games.

Seven games were canceled due to the players' strike (at Atlanta, Dallas, Detroit, at Green Bay, at St Louis, Los Angeles Rams, and at Pittsburgh) – the latter was actually planned for Monday Night Football (the two teams have yet to meet in prime-time to this day). The game against the New York Giants originally scheduled for Monday Night Football on October 25, 1982 was moved to January 2, 1983 as the NFL created a "17th week" of the 1982 season. It was the first time the NFL played a regular season game in January.

=== Schedule ===
Week	Date	Opponent	Result	Record	Venue	Attendance
1	September 12	**Washington Redskins**	**L** 34–37 (OT)	0–1	Veterans Stadium	68,885
2	September 19	at Cleveland Browns	**W** 24–21	1–1	Cleveland Municipal Stadium	78,830
3–10	Players' strike					
11	November 21	Cincinnati Bengals	**L** 14–18	1–2	Veterans Stadium	65,172
12	November 28	at **Washington Redskins**	**L** 9–13	1–3	RFK Stadium	48,313
13	December 5	**St. Louis Cardinals**	**L** 20–23	1–4	Veterans Stadium	63,622
14	December 11	at **New York Giants**	**L** 7–23	1–5	Giants Stadium	66,053
15	December 19	Houston Oilers	**W** 35–14	2–5	Veterans Stadium	44,119
16	December 26	at **Dallas Cowboys**	**W** 24–20	3–5	Texas Stadium	46,199
17	January 2, 1983	**New York Giants**	**L** 24–26	3–6	Veterans Stadium	55,797

Note: Intra-division opponents are in bold text.

=== Season summary ===
==== Week 14 at Giants ====
Week Fourteen: New York Giants (2–3) at Philadelphia Eagles (1–4)

Quarter	1	2	3	4	Total
Eagles	7	0	0	0	**7**
**Giants**	3	14	3	3	**23**

at Giants Stadium, East Rutherford, New Jersey

- Date: December 11
- Game time: 12:30 p.m.
- Game weather: 35 °F (2 °C)
- Game attendance: 66,053
- Referee: Fred Silva
- Box Score

Game information

**First quarter**

- NYG – Joe Danelo 37-yard field goal. Giants 3–0. Drive:
- PHI – Harold Carmichael 23-yard pass from Ron Jaworski (Tony Franklin kick). Eagles 7–3. Drive:

**Second quarter**

- NYG – Butch Woolfolk 5-yard pass from Scott Brunner (Joe Danelo kick). Giants 10–7. Drive:
- NYG – Earnest Gray 16-yard pass from Scott Brunner (Joe Danelo kick). Giants 17–7. Drive:

**Third quarter**

- NYG – Joe Danelo 34-yard field goal. Giants 20–7. Drive:

**Fourth quarter**

- NYG – Joe Danelo 29-yard field goal. Giants 23–7. Drive:

Top passers

- PHI – Ron Jaworski – 17/29, 218 yards, TD, INT
- NYG – Scott Brunner – 17/26, 272 yards, 2 TD

Top rushers

- PHI – Wilbert Montgomery – 7 rushes, 23 yards
- NYG – Rob Carpenter – 26 rushes, 58 yards

Top receivers

- PHI – Harold Carmichael – 4 receptions, 57 yards, TD
- NYG – Floyd Eddings – 5 receptions, 148 yards

== Standings ==
NFC East
	W	L	T	PCT	DIV	CONF	PF	PA	STK
Washington Redskins^{(1)}	8	1	0	.889	6–1	8–1	190	128	W4
Dallas Cowboys^{(2)}	6	3	0	.667	2–1	4–2	226	145	L2
St. Louis Cardinals^{(6)}	5	4	0	.556	3–1	5–4	135	170	L1
New York Giants	4	5	0	.444	2–3	3–5	164	160	W1
Philadelphia Eagles	3	6	0	.333	1–5	1–5	191	195	L1

NFC
#	Team	W	L	T	PCT	PF	PA	STK
Seeded postseason qualifiers
1	Washington Redskins	8	1	0	.889	190	128	W4
2	Dallas Cowboys	6	3	0	.667	226	145	L2
3	Green Bay Packers	5	3	1	.611	226	169	L1
4 (Note: Minnesota (4–1), Atlanta (4–3), St. Louis (5–4), Tampa Bay (3–3) seeds were determined by best won-lost record in conference games.)	Minnesota Vikings	5	4	0	.556	187	198	W1
5	Atlanta Falcons	5	4	0	.556	183	199	L2
6	St. Louis Cardinals	5	4	0	.556	135	170	L1
7	Tampa Bay Buccaneers	5	4	0	.556	158	178	W3
8 (Note: Detroit finished ahead of New Orleans and the N.Y. Giants based on best conference record (4–4 to Saints’ 3–5 to Giants’ 3–5).)	Detroit Lions	4	5	0	.444	181	176	W1
Did not qualify for the postseason
9	New Orleans Saints	4	5	0	.444	129	160	W1
10	New York Giants	4	5	0	.444	164	160	W1
11 (Note: San Francisco finished ahead of Chicago, and Chicago finished ahead of Philadelphia, based on conference record (49ers’ 2–3 to Bears’ 2–5 to Eagles’ 1–5).)	San Francisco 49ers	3	6	0	.333	209	206	L1
12	Chicago Bears	3	6	0	.333	141	174	L1
13	Philadelphia Eagles	3	6	0	.333	191	195	L1
14	Los Angeles Rams	2	7	0	.222	200	250	W1
Tiebreakers
