= 1980–81 NFL playoffs =

American football tournament

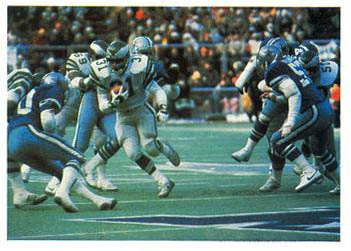
- The Philadelphia Eagles and Dallas Cowboys in the 1980 NFC Championship Game
- Dates: December 28, 1980–January 25, 1981
- Season: 1980
- Teams: 10
- Games played: 9
- Super Bowl XV site: Louisiana Superdome; New Orleans, Louisiana, U.S.
- Defending champions: Pittsburgh Steelers (did not qualify)
- Champion: Oakland Raiders (2nd title)
- Runner-up: Philadelphia Eagles
- Conference runners-up: Dallas Cowboys; San Diego Chargers
NFL playoffs
← 1979–80	1981–82 →

The National Football League playoffs for the 1980 season began on December 28, 1980. The postseason tournament concluded with the Oakland Raiders defeating the Philadelphia Eagles in Super Bowl XV, 27–10, on January 25, 1981, at the Louisiana Superdome in New Orleans, Louisiana.

== Participants ==
Within each conference, the three division winners and the two non-division winners with the best overall regular season records qualified for the playoffs. The NFL did not use a fixed-bracket playoff system. The three division winners were seeded 1–3 based on their overall won-lost-tied record, and received a first-round bye while the wild card teams were seeded 4 and 5, and played in the first round, dubbed the wild-card playoffs or wild-card weekend, with the 4 seed hosting. The second round, the divisional playoffs, had a restriction where two teams from the same division could not meet: the surviving wild card team visited the division champion outside its division that had the higher seed, and the remaining two teams from that conference played each other. The two surviving teams from each conference's divisional playoff games then met in the respective AFC and NFC Conference Championship games, hosted by the higher seed. Finally the Super Bowl, the championship round of the playoffs, was played at a neutral site, with the designated home team based on an annual rotation by conference.

Playoff seeds
Seed	AFC	NFC
1	San Diego Chargers (West winner)	Atlanta Falcons (West winner)
2	Cleveland Browns (Central winner)	Philadelphia Eagles (East winner)
3	Buffalo Bills (East winner)	Minnesota Vikings (Central winner)
4	Oakland Raiders (wild card)	Dallas Cowboys (wild card)
5	Houston Oilers (wild card)	Los Angeles Rams (wild card)

== Bracket ==
Note: The San Diego Chargers (the AFC 1 seed) did not play the Oakland Raiders (the 4 seed) in the Divisional playoff round because both teams were in the same division.

Jan 4 – Cleveland Stadium
4	Oakland	14
Dec 28 – Oakland–Alameda County Coliseum	Jan 11 – Jack Murphy Stadium
2*	Cleveland	12
AFC
5	Houston	7	4	Oakland	34
Jan 3 – Jack Murphy Stadium
4	Oakland	27	1	San Diego	27
AFC Championship
3	Buffalo	14
Jan 25 – Louisiana Superdome
1*	San Diego	20
Divisional playoffs
Wild Card playoffs	A4	Oakland	27
Jan 4 – Atlanta–Fulton County Stadium
N2	Philadelphia	10
Super Bowl XV
4	Dallas	30
Dec 28 – Texas Stadium	Jan 11 – Veterans Stadium
1	Atlanta	27
NFC
5	Los Angeles	13	4	Dallas	7
Jan 3 – Veterans Stadium
4	Dallas	34	2	Philadelphia	20
NFC Championship
3	Minnesota	16
2	Philadelphia	31

== Schedule ==
In the United States, CBS televised the NFC playoff games, while NBC broadcast the AFC games and Super Bowl XV.

Round	Away team	Score	Home team	Date	Kickoff (ET / UTC−5)	TV
Wild-card round	Los Angeles Rams	13–34	Dallas Cowboys	December 28, 1980	1:30 p.m.	CBS
Wild-card round	Houston Oilers	7–27	Oakland Raiders	December 28, 1980	5:00 p.m.	NBC
Divisional round	Minnesota Vikings	16–31	Philadelphia Eagles	January 3, 1981	12:30 p.m.	CBS
Divisional round	Buffalo Bills	14–20	San Diego Chargers	January 3, 1981	4:00 p.m.	NBC
Divisional round	Oakland Raiders	14–12	Cleveland Browns	January 4, 1981	12:30 p.m.	NBC
Divisional round	Dallas Cowboys	30–27	Atlanta Falcons	January 4, 1981	4:00 p.m.	CBS
Conference championships	Dallas Cowboys	7–20	Philadelphia Eagles	January 11, 1981	12:30 p.m.	CBS
Conference championships	Oakland Raiders	34–27	San Diego Chargers	January 11, 1981	5:00 p.m.	NBC
Super Bowl XV Louisiana Superdome New Orleans, Louisiana	Oakland Raiders	27–10	Philadelphia Eagles	January 25, 1981	6:00 p.m.	NBC

== Wild-card round ==
=== Sunday, December 28, 1980 ===
==== NFC: Dallas Cowboys 34, Los Angeles Rams 13 ====
Los Angeles Rams vs. Dallas Cowboys – Game summary

Quarter	1	2	3	4	Total
Rams	6	7	0	0	13
Cowboys	3	10	14	7	34

at Texas Stadium, Irving, Texas

- Game time: 1:30 p.m. EST
- Game weather: 60 °F (16 °C), mostly cloudy
- Game attendance: 63,052
- Referee: Pat Haggerty
- TV announcers (CBS): Gary Bender (play-by-play) and John Madden (color commentator)

Game information

First quarter

- DAL – Rafael Septién 28-yard field goal. Cowboys 3–0.
- LA – Jewerl Thomas 1-yard run (kick failed). Rams 6–3.

Second quarter

- DAL – Rafael Septién 29-yard field goal. Tied 6–6.
- LA – Preston Dennard 21-yard pass from Vince Ferragamo (Frank Corral kick). Rams 13–6.
- DAL – Tony Dorsett 12-yard run (Rafael Septién kick). Tied 13–13.

Third quarter

- DAL – Tony Dorsett 10-yard pass from Danny White (Rafael Septién kick). Cowboys 20–13.
- DAL – Butch Johnson 35-yard pass from Danny White (Rafael Septién kick). Cowboys 27–13.

Fourth quarter

- DAL – Drew Pearson 11-yard pass from Danny White (Rafael Septién kick). Cowboys 34–13.

Top passers

- LA – Vince Ferragamo – 14/30, 175 yards, TD, 3 INT
- DAL – Danny White – 12/25, 190 yards, 3 TD, 3 INT

Top rushers

- LA – Jewerl Thomas – 14 rushes, 48 yards, TD
- DAL – Tony Dorsett – 22 rushes, 160 yards, TD

Top receivers

- LA – Preston Dennard – 6 receptions, 117 yards, TD
- DAL – Drew Pearson – 4 receptions, 60 yards, TD

The Cowboys avenged both a 38–14 loss to the Rams two weeks earlier (in a game they trailed 38–0), and their upset defeat in the previous year's NFC Divisional playoff as Dallas running back Tony Dorsett rushed for 160 yards, caught three passes for 28 yards, and scored two touchdowns to lead his team to victory.

A 14-yard punt return by Dallas running back James Jones set up kicker Rafael Septién's 28-yard field goal to give the Cowboys a 3-0 lead. The Rams responded by driving 73 yards to score on running back Jewerl Thomas' 1-yard run. However, the ensuing extra point was blocked and Septién later made a 29-yard field goal to tie the game at 6.

In the second quarter, Los Angeles drove 80 yards in six plays to score on Vince Ferragamo's 21-yard touchdown pass to receiver Preston Dennard, who finished the game with six receptions for 117 yards, but the Cowboys tied the game before halftime by moving the ball 71 yards on a drive that ended with Dorsett's 12-yard rushing touchdown.

After the game was tied at halftime, 13–13, Dallas coach Tom Landry went to a 5-man defensive front and they dropped various combinations into seven and eight man coverage to confuse the Rams potent passing game. The result was a combination of pressure on Ferragamo, who completed just five of 13 second half passes for 49 yards and was intercepted three times.

Danny White threw touchdown passes on Dallas' first three drives of the second half. His 37-yard completion to tight end Jay Saldi set up a score on a 10-yard pass to Dorsett, who caught the ball at the 7 and dragged Rams defenders Johnnie Johnson and Rod Perry all the way into the end zone. Then Cowboys corner Aaron Mitchell picked off a pass from Ferragamo and returned it 12 yards, setting off a 70-yard Dallas drive that ended with White's 35-yard touchdown completion to Butch Johnson. Now with a comfortable lead, Dallas put the game away early in the fourth quarter, driving 95 yards, including a 23-yard burst by Dorsett, to go up 34-13 on White's 11-yard touchdown pass to Drew Pearson.

Dallas then turned to a potent rushing attack to chew up time and keep the Rams offense off the field. By the end of the game, Dallas rushed 46 times for a franchise playoff record 338 yards, while also setting a franchise record for total yards with 528 and holding the Rams to 260. Jones finished the game with three kickoff returns for 72 yards, five punt returns for 81 yards, and another 38 yards on five carries.

This was the sixth postseason meeting between the Rams and Cowboys. Dallas previously won three of the five meetings.

Previous playoff games
Dallas leads 3–2 in all-time playoff games

1973

Los Angeles Rams 16 @ Dallas Cowboys 27

1973 NFC Divisional playoffs

1975

Dallas Cowboys 37 @ Los Angeles Rams 7

1975 NFC Championship Game

1976

Los Angeles Rams 14 @ Dallas Cowboys 12

1976 NFC Divisional playoffs

1978

Dallas Cowboys 28 @ Los Angeles Rams 0

1978 NFC Championship Game

1979

Los Angeles Rams 21 @ Dallas Cowboys 19

1979 NFC Divisional playoffs

==== AFC: Oakland Raiders 27, Houston Oilers 7 ====
Houston Oilers vs. Oakland Raiders – Game summary

Quarter	1	2	3	4	Total
Oilers	7	0	0	0	7
Raiders	3	7	0	17	27

at Oakland Coliseum, Oakland, California

- Game time: 5:00 p.m. EST
- Game weather: 58 °F (14 °C), sunny
- Game attendance: 53,333
- Referee: Chuck Heberling
- TV announcers (NBC): Charlie Jones (play-by-play) and Len Dawson (color commentator)

Game information

First quarter

- OAK – Chris Bahr 47-yard field goal. Raiders 3–0.
- HOU – Earl Campbell 1-yard run (Toni Fritsch kick). Oilers 7–3.

Second quarter

- OAK – Todd Christensen 1-yard pass from Jim Plunkett (Chris Bahr kick). Raiders 10–7.

Third quarter

- No scoring plays.

Fourth quarter

- OAK – Arthur Whittington 44-yard pass from Jim Plunkett (Chris Bahr kick). Raiders 17–7.
- OAK – Chris Bahr 37-yard field goal. Raiders 20–7.
- OAK – Lester Hayes 20-yard interception return (Chris Bahr kick). Raiders 27–7.

Top passers

- HOU – Ken Stabler – 15/26, 243 yards, 2 INT
- OAK – Jim Plunkett – 8/23, 168 yards, 2 TD, INT

Top rushers

- HOU – Earl Campbell – 27 rushes, 91 yards, TD
- OAK – Kenny King – 13 rushes, 55 yards

Top receivers

- HOU – Mike Barber – 4 receptions, 83 yards
- OAK – Arthur Whittington – 2 receptions, 64 yards, TD

Even though the Oilers recorded more yards, more first downs, and more time of possession, the Raiders scored on big plays to win 27–7. This game was notable in that the Oilers starting quarterback was Ken Stabler, who had spent 10 years as Oakland's quarterback before he was traded to Houston prior to this season. Houston's offense also featured future hall of fame tight end Dave Casper, who had played for Oakland since 1974 until he was traded to the Oilers in week 6.

Houston running back Earl Campbell lost a fumble on the first play of the game, which was recovered by Oakland safety Mike Davis, setting up Oakland kicker Chris Bahr's 47-yard field goal. After several more possessions, Stabler's 22-yard pass to Ronnie Coleman and a 15-yard run by Campbell got the Oilers moving on a 55-yard, 9-play drive that ended with Campbell's 1-yard touchdown run. In the second quarter, Raiders quarterback Jim Plunkett completed a 37-yard pass to running back Kenny King before finishing the 59-yard drive with a 1-yard touchdown pass to Todd Christensen, giving the Raiders a 10-7 lead which they took into halftime.

Houston mounted a scoring threat in the third quarter, but Raiders cornerback Lester Hayes intercepted Stabler in the end zone. Neither team would score again until the fourth quarter, when Oakland moved the ball 80 yards in four plays, with Plunkett completing a 33-yard pass to Cliff Branch before finding Arthur Whittington in the end zone for a 44-yard score. Later on, his 21-yard completion to running back Mark van Eeghen sparked a 55-yard drive that set up Bahr's 37-yard field goal. With about six minutes left in the game, Hayes returned an interception 20 yards to the end zone to clinch the Raiders' victory. This would the last playoff game Oakland would host until 2000.

Stabler threw for 243 yards, but was intercepted twice and sacked seven times. Campbell rushed for 91 yards and a score. Hayes had two interceptions, three pass deflections, and two sacks.

After the game, Oilers linebacker Thomas Henderson was so upset he threw several pieces of his equipment into the stands, including his shoes. "If I wouldn't have been arrested for indecent exposure, I would have thrown them my jock strap", he said later.

This was the third postseason meeting between the Oilers and Raiders. Oakland won both previous meetings back when both teams were in the AFL.

Previous playoff games
Oakland leads 2–0 in all-time playoff games

1967

Houston Oilers 7 @ Oakland Raiders 40

1967 AFL Championship Game

1969

Houston Oilers 7 @ Oakland Raiders 56

1969 AFL Divisional playoffs

== Divisional round ==
=== Saturday, January 3, 1981 ===
==== NFC: Philadelphia Eagles 31, Minnesota Vikings 16 ====
Minnesota Vikings vs. Philadelphia Eagles – Game summary

Quarter	1	2	3	4	Total
Vikings	7	7	2	0	16
Eagles	0	7	14	10	31

at Veterans Stadium, Philadelphia, Pennsylvania

- Game time: 12:30 p.m. EST
- Game weather: 29 °F (−2 °C), cloudy
- Game attendance: 70,178
- Referee: Jim Tunney
- TV announcers (CBS): Pat Summerall (play-by-play) and Tom Brookshier (color commentator)

Game information

First quarter

- MIN – Sammy White 30-yard pass from Tommy Kramer (Rick Danmeier kick). Vikings 7–0.

Second quarter

- MIN – Ted Brown 1-yard run (Rick Danmeier kick). Vikings 14–0.
- PHI – Harold Carmichael 9-yard pass from Ron Jaworski (Tony Franklin kick). Vikings 14–7.

Third quarter

- PHI – Wilbert Montgomery 8-yard run (Tony Franklin kick). Tied 14–14.
- MIN – Safety, Doug Martin and Matt Blair tackled Ron Jaworski in end zone. Vikings 16–14.
- PHI – Wilbert Montgomery 5-yard run (Tony Franklin kick). Eagles 21–16.

Fourth quarter

- PHI – Tony Franklin 33-yard field goal. Eagles 24–16.
- PHI – Perry Harrington 2-yard run (Tony Franklin kick). Eagles 31–16.

Top passers

- MIN – Tommy Kramer – 19/39, 209 yards, TD, 5 INT
- PHI – Ron Jaworski – 17/38, 190 yards, TD, 2 INT

Top rushers

- MIN – Doug Paschal – 4 rushes, 26 yards
- PHI – Wilbert Montgomery – 26 rushes, 74 yards, 2 TD

Top receivers

- MIN – Rickey Young – 6 receptions, 57 yards
- PHI – Harold Carmichael – 7 receptions, 84 yards, TD

The Eagles forced eight turnovers, seven in the second half, en route to a 31–16 victory, while also holding the Vikings to just 215 total yards, with a mere 36 on the ground. It marked a bitter repeat for Minnesota, who had lost to the Eagles 42-7 during the regular season.

The Vikings scored 14 unanswered points in the first half, starting with wide receiver Sammy White's 30-yard touchdown reception from quarterback Tommy Kramer. Then after a punt, they drove 69 yards in 10 plays to score on running back Ted Brown's 1-yard touchdown run. However, Philadelphia scored before halftime by finishing off an 85-yard drive with quarterback Ron Jaworski's 9-yard touchdown completion to wide receiver Harold Carmichael. The Eagles then tied the game on the opening possession of the second half with Wilbert Montgomery's 8-yard touchdown run.

Then the wave of turnovers began (11 total between both teams). First, Kramer threw a pass that was intercepted by Roynell Young on the Eagles 7-yard line. Minnesota then scored a safety when Jaworski was sacked in the end zone by Matt Blair and Doug Martin, but Reggie Wilkes recovered a fumbled punt return by Vikings running back Eddie Payton on the Minnesota 18 that set up Montgomery's 5-yard touchdown run, putting the Eagles up 21-16. With 16 seconds left in the third quarter, Eagles defensive end Carl Hairston forced a recovered a fumble from Kramer on the Vikings 44-yard line. But this opportunity was wasted as Montgomery fumbled the ball back to Minnesota on the next play.

Early in the fourth quarter, Ken Clarke of the Eagles recovered a fumble from Doug Paschal, which was soon countered by Jaworski's interception to John Turner. A few plays later, Herm Edwards intercepted a pass from Kramer, only to see this later nullified by Jaworski's interception to Tom Hannon. With 9:16 left in regulation, Eagles linebacker Frank LeMaster returned an interception from Kramer seven yards to the Vikings 15, leading to Tony Franklin's 33-yard field goal to increase the Eagles lead to 24-16. Then on the Vikings next drive, Edwards intercepted another pass and returned it 14 yards to the Minnesota 31, leading to Perry Harrington's 1-yard rushing touchdown to make the final score 31-16. On the last play of the game, Young intercepted a pass from Kramer in the end zone.

This was the first postseason meeting between the Vikings and Eagles.

==== AFC: San Diego Chargers 20, Buffalo Bills 14 ====
Buffalo Bills vs. San Diego Chargers – Game summary

Quarter	1	2	3	4	Total
Bills	0	14	0	0	14
Chargers	3	0	7	10	20

at Jack Murphy Stadium, San Diego, California

- Game time: 4:00 p.m. EST
- Game weather: 65 °F (18 °C), sunny
- Game attendance: 52,253
- Referee: Gene Barth
- TV announcers (NBC): Dick Enberg (play-by-play) and Merlin Olsen (color commentator)

Game information

First quarter

- SD – Rolf Benirschke 22-yard field goal. Chargers 3–0.

Second quarter

- BUF – Roosevelt Leaks 1-yard run (Nick Mike-Mayer kick). Bills 7–3.
- BUF – Frank Lewis 9-yard pass from Joe Ferguson (Nick Mike-Mayer kick). Bills 14–3.

Third quarter

- SD – Charlie Joiner 9-yard pass from Dan Fouts (Rolf Benirschke kick). Bills 14–10.

Fourth quarter

- SD – Rolf Benirschke 22-yard field goal. Bills 14–13.
- SD – Ron Smith 50-yard pass from Dan Fouts (Rolf Benirschke kick). Chargers 20–14.

Top passers

- BUF – Joe Ferguson – 15/29, 180 yards, TD, 3 INT
- SD – Dan Fouts – 22/37, 314 yards, 2 TD, INT

Top rushers

- BUF – Joe Cribbs – 18 rushes, 53 yards
- SD – Chuck Muncie – 18 rushes, 80 yards

Top receivers

- BUF – Mark Brammer – 4 receptions, 62 yards
- SD – John Jefferson – 7 receptions, 102 yards

Although San Diego outgained Buffalo in total yards, 397 to 244, they still found themselves trailing for most of the game. With 2:08 left in the fourth quarter, Chargers quarterback Dan Fouts threw the game-winning 50-yard touchdown pass to receiver Ron Smith to defeat the Bills, 20–14. This was San Diego's first postseason win since 1963 (in the AFL) and their first playoff win as an NFL team.

San Diego scored first with a 22-yard field goal by Rolf Benirschke on their opening drive. But the Bills stormed back with two unanswered touchdowns. First they responded to the field goal by driving 72 yards, aided by a 37-yard pass interference penalty on linebacker Ray Preston, to score on Roosevelt Leaks' 1-yard touchdown run. Late in the second quarter, Charles Romes forced a fumble from Charlie Joiner that defensive back Bill Simpson recovered for Buffalo on the Chargers 33-yard line. The Bills then drove to a 14-3 lead in four plays, as Joe Ferguson completed an 18-yard pass to Frank Lewis and then found him in the end zone for a 9-yard score.

However, San Diego took the second half kickoff and quickly racked up yardage with an 18-yard run by Chuck Muncie and a 45-yard completion from Fouts to Joiner. Fouts eventually finished the 70-yard drive with a 9-yard touchdown pass to Joiner, making the score 14-10. Then late in the third quarter, the Chargers forced the Bills to punt from their own 8-yard line and got the ball with great field position on the Buffalo 49. Fouts then led the team to the 1, but a penalty pushed them back and they ended up settling for Rolf Benirschke's 22-yard field goal to make it 14–13.

Buffalo had a great chance to put the game away when Lou Piccone blocked a Chargers punt that was recovered by linebacker Ervin Parker on the San Diego 38. But safety Glen Edwards intercepted a pass from Ferguson on the San Diego 9-yard line to keep the Bills from scoring. With 6:17 left in regulation, Buffalo got another chance to get a decisive score when they recovered a fumbled punt return from Mike Fuller. But two plays later, defensive tackle Fred Dean dropped Joe Cribbs for a 1-yard loss on third and 1, and then Nick Mike-Mayer missed a 49-yard field goal attempt, giving the ball back to San Diego with 3:59 left.

After driving to midfield, the Chargers faced third and 10 with 2:08 remaining. Buffalo sent safety Steve Freeman on a blitz for the next play, leaving Smith, San Diego's No. 3 receiver, one on one with Simpson. Earlier in the game, Simpson had knocked the ball out of Smith's hands during a catch attempt and then picked it off in mid air. But this time, Smith managed to get one step ahead of Simpson, make the catch, and evade his desperate diving tackle attempt, leaving Simpson face down on the turf as he raced 50 yards for a touchdown. Edwards sealed the victory for the Chargers after the ensuing kickoff by recording his second interception from Ferguson with 1:16 left in the game.

After the game, it was revealed that Ferguson had been playing with a fractured ankle, suffered three weeks earlier in a game against the New England Patriots. He finished the day with 180 yards and a touchdown, but was intercepted three times. Fouts threw for 314 yards and two touchdowns, with one interception. His top target was receiver John Jefferson, who caught seven passes for 102 yards. Prior to this game, Ron Smith had caught only 7 passes during the season, and his 50-yard game winning score was his only catch of the game.

This was the third postseason meeting between the Bills and Chargers. Buffalo won both prior meetings when both teams resided in the AFL.

Previous playoff games
Buffalo leads 2–0 in all-time playoff games

1964

San Diego Chargers 7 @ Buffalo Bills 20

1964 AFL Championship Game

1965

Buffalo Bills 23 @ San Diego Chargers 0

1965 AFL Championship Game

=== Sunday, January 4, 1981 ===
==== AFC: Oakland Raiders 14, Cleveland Browns 12 ====
Oakland Raiders vs. Cleveland Browns – Game summary

Quarter	1	2	3	4	Total
Raiders	0	7	0	7	14
Browns	0	6	6	0	12

at Cleveland Stadium, Cleveland, Ohio

- Game time: 12:30 p.m. EST
- Game weather: 4 °F (−16 °C), cloudy
- Game attendance: 78,245
- Referee: Ben Dreith
- TV announcers (NBC): Don Criqui (play-by-play) and John Brodie (color commentator)

Game information

First quarter

- No scoring plays.

Second quarter

- CLE – Ron Bolton 42-yard interception return (kick failed). Browns 6–0.
- OAK – Mark van Eeghen 1-yard run (Chris Bahr kick). Raiders 7–6.

Third quarter

- CLE – Don Cockroft 30-yard field goal. Browns 9–7.
- CLE – Don Cockroft 30-yard field goal. Browns 12–7.

Fourth quarter

- OAK – Mark van Eeghen 1-yard run (Chris Bahr kick). Raiders 14–12.

Top passers

- OAK – Jim Plunkett – 14/30, 149 yards, 2 INT
- CLE – Brian Sipe – 13/40, 183 yards, 3 INT

Top rushers

- OAK – Mark van Eeghen – 20 rushes, 45 yards, 2 TD
- CLE – Mike Pruitt – 13 rushes, 48 yards

Top receivers

- OAK – Raymond Chester – 3 receptions, 64 yards
- CLE – Greg Pruitt – 3 receptions, 54 yards

In a play that has become known as Red Right 88, Browns quarterback Brian Sipe's pass was intercepted in the end zone by Raiders safety Mike Davis with 41 seconds left in the game to preserve Oakland's 14–12 victory. Instead of opting for a game-winning field goal, Cleveland decided to attempt a passing play because Browns kicker Don Cockroft had previously missed two of four field goal attempts, had another aborted following a bad snap, and had one extra point blocked. In addition, the field was frozen and slippery.

With the game-time temperature at 4 °F (−16 °C), the coldest NFL playoff game since the Ice Bowl of December 31, 1967, the first quarter contained nothing but punts and interceptions, with Cleveland's Ron Bolton and Oakland's Lester Hayes each recording a pick. Near the end of the quarter, Sipe's 20-yard completion to Reggie Rucker sparked a drive inside the Raiders 30-yard line, but it ended with no points early in the second quarter when Cockroft missed a field goal attempt from 47 yards. On Oakland's ensuing drive, quarterback Jim Plunkett lost a fumble while being sacked, but their defense kept the Browns in check and Cockroft missed another field goal try, this one from 30 yards out.

Finally with 6:02 left in the second quarter, Bolton scored the first points of the day by recording his second interception from Plunkett and returning it 42 yards to the end zone. However, Cockroft's ensuing extra point was blocked by Ted Hendricks. After an exchange of punts, Oakland managed to get on the board, with Plunkett completing passes to Bob Chandler and Raymond Chester for gains of 15 and 26 yards on a 64-yard scoring drive. Mark van Eeghen finished it off with a 1-yard touchdown run with 18 seconds left in the half, making the score 7–6.

On Cleveland's opening drive of the second half, a 28-yard kickoff return to the 40-yard line by Charles White started off a 48-yard drive that ended with Cockroft's 30-yard field goal, retaking the lead for the Browns at 9–7. Then after forcing a punt, Cleveland drove to the Raiders 24-yard line, but on a field goal attempt, holder Paul McDonald was unable to handle a bad snap and was downed for an 11-yard loss. Starting out their next drive on the Raiders 44 after a punt, Cleveland drove to the 9, featuring a 21-yard reception by Dave Logan to score on another 30-yard field goal from Cockroft, making the score 12–7 going into the fourth quarter.

Early in the final quarter, the Raiders took a 14–12 lead at the end of an 80-yard drive highlighted by Chester's 27-yard catch. On the last play, van Eeghen scored his second 1-yard touchdown run of the day. Later on, the Raiders had a chance to put the game away when they recovered a fumble from Sipe on the Browns 24-yard line with 4:19 left in the game. But after moving to a third and 1 situation on the 15, van Eeghen was stuffed for no gain on two consecutive plays. On the second play after the turnover, Sipe completed a 29-yard pass to tight end Ozzie Newsome and later a 23-yarder to Greg Pruitt. Then Mike Pruitt ran the ball 14 yards to the Raiders 14-yard line. Pruitt gained another yard on the next play, and the team called a timeout from the 13 with 49 seconds left.

Browns coach Sam Rutigliano called for a pass play, Red Right 88, instructing Sipe that if no one was open "throw it to the blond in the first row". His intention was to give the team one last chance to score a touchdown before running the ball on third down to set up a Cockroft field goal. But on the pass play, Sipe was picked off by Davis while trying to connect with Newsome in the back of the end zone, allowing the Raiders to escape with a win.

The quarterbacks of both teams were completely dominated throughout the game. Sipe completed just 13 of 40 passes for 183 yards and intercepted three times, while Plunkett completed only 14 of 30 passes for 149 yards, with two interceptions. Hayes and Bolton each had two interceptions.

This was the first postseason meeting between the Raiders and Browns.

==== NFC: Dallas Cowboys 30, Atlanta Falcons 27 ====
Dallas Cowboys vs. Atlanta Falcons – Game summary

Quarter	1	2	3	4	Total
Cowboys	3	7	0	20	30
Falcons	10	7	7	3	27

at Atlanta–Fulton County Stadium, Atlanta, Georgia

- Game time: 4:00 p.m. EST
- Game weather: 39 °F (4 °C), sunny, breezy
- Game attendance: 59,793
- Referee: Fred Silva
- TV announcers (CBS): Vin Scully (play-by-play) and George Allen (color commentator)

Game information

First quarter

- ATL – Tim Mazzetti 38-yard field goal. Falcons 3–0.
- ATL – Alfred Jenkins 60-yard pass from Steve Bartkowski (Tim Mazzetti kick). Falcons 10–0.
- DAL – Rafael Septién 38-yard field goal. Falcons 10–3.

Second quarter

- DAL – Billy Joe DuPree 5-yard pass from Danny White (Rafael Septién kick). Tied 10–10.
- ATL – Lynn Cain 1-yard run (Tim Mazzetti kick). Falcons 17–10.

Third quarter

- ATL – William Andrews 12-yard pass from Steve Bartkowski (Tim Mazzetti kick). Falcons 24–10.

Fourth quarter

- DAL – Robert Newhouse 1-yard run (Rafael Septién kick). Falcons 24–17.
- ATL – Tim Mazzetti 34-yard field goal. Falcons 27–17.
- DAL – Drew Pearson 14-yard pass from Danny White (Rafael Septién kick). Falcons 27–24.
- DAL – Drew Pearson 23-yard pass from Danny White (kick failed). Cowboys 30–27.

Top passers

- DAL – Danny White – 25/39, 322 yards, 3 TD, INT
- ATL – Steve Bartkowski – 18/33, 320 yards, 2 TD, INT

Top rushers

- DAL – Tony Dorsett – 10 rushes, 51 yards
- ATL – Lynn Cain – 13 rushes, 43 yards, TD

Top receivers

- DAL – Tony Hill – 5 receptions, 90 yards, 2 TD
- ATL – Alfred Jenkins — 4 receptions, 155 yards, TD

The Cowboys scored three touchdowns in the fourth quarter to come from behind and defeat the Falcons 30–27. Atlanta jumped to a 10–0 lead, aided by quarterback Steve Bartkowski's 60-yard touchdown pass to wide receiver Alfred Jenkins. After the Jenkins touchdown, the Cowboys got on the board with a Rafael Septien field goal after an apparent 20-yard touchdown pass from Danny White to Butch Johnson was ruled incomplete. However, it appeared Johnson had full possession of the ball in the end zone before Falcons CB Kenny Johnson knocked it out of his hands.

In the second quarter, Dallas recovered a fumble in Atlanta territory and tied the game on quarterback Danny White's 5-yard touchdown completion to tight end Billy Joe DuPree. However, the Falcons responded with a 1-yard touchdown run by Lynn Cain to take a 17–10 lead. Then after forcing a punt, Atlanta mounted another drive into Dallas territory, but Steve Wilson intercepted a pass from Bartkowski and the score remained 17–10 at halftime.

Dallas started out the second half with a drive to midfield, but lost the ball on a play that initially appeared to go in their favor. Running back Preston Pearson caught a short pass from White and took off for a big gain, but linebacker Joel Williams, who initially pressured White into making the pass, managed to chase Pearson down and force a fumble on the 15-yard line. After recovering the fumble, Atlanta stormed down the field and increased their lead to 24–10 with Bartkowski's 12-yard touchdown pass to running back William Andrews.

Starting a drive with 3:38 left in the third quarter, Dallas mounted an 85-yard drive that ended with Robert Newhouse's 1-yard touchdown run with 13:50 left in the game. Dallas subsequently forced a punt, but Atlanta safety Tom Pridemore intercepted a pass from White and returned it 22 yards to the Cowboys 37-yard line, setting up a 34-yard field goal from Tim Mazzetti to increase the lead to 27–17. Dallas then marched 62 yards to score on Drew Pearson's 14-yard touchdown reception with 3:04 left in the game. Then two plays after the ensuing kickoff, Dallas lineman Ed "Too Tall" Jones appeared to jump offsides, which would have given the Falcons a first down, but managed to maintain his footing and avoid crossing the line of scrimmage before the snap. As a result, his sudden movement threw off Atlanta's offense and he ended up making a key tackle to end the drive and force a punt. Following the punt, Dallas advanced 70 yards to score on Pearson's 23-yard touchdown catch with 47 seconds left.

Charlie Waters fumbled the snap on the extra point attempt, keeping the score 30–27 and giving Atlanta a chance to drive for the tying field goal. But the Falcons turned the ball over on downs before they could move it out of their own territory.

Jenkins finished the game with four receptions for 155 yards.

The game is featured as one of the NFL's Greatest Games as the Duel in Dixie.

This was the second postseason meeting between the Cowboys and Falcons. Dallas won the only prior meeting.

Previous playoff games
Dallas leads 1–0 in all-time playoff games

1978

Atlanta Falcons 20 @ Dallas Cowboys 27

1978 NFC Divisional playoffs

== Conference championships ==
=== Sunday, January 11, 1981 ===
==== NFC: Philadelphia Eagles 20, Dallas Cowboys 7 ====
Dallas Cowboys vs. Philadelphia Eagles – Game summary

Quarter	1	2	3	4	Total
Cowboys	0	7	0	0	7
Eagles	7	0	10	3	20

at Veterans Stadium, Philadelphia, Pennsylvania

- Game time: 12:30 p.m. EST
- Game weather: 17 °F (−8 °C), sunny, breezy
- Game attendance: 71,522
- Referee: Jerry Markbreit
- TV announcers (CBS): Pat Summerall (play-by-play) and Tom Brookshier (color commentator)

Game information

First quarter

- PHI – Wilbert Montgomery 42-yard run (Tony Franklin kick). Eagles 7–0.

Second quarter

- DAL – Tony Dorsett 3-yard run (Rafael Septién kick). Tied 7–7.

Third quarter

- PHI – Tony Franklin 26-yard field goal. Eagles 10–7.
- PHI – Leroy Harris 9-yard run (Tony Franklin kick). Eagles 17–7.

Fourth quarter

- PHI – Tony Franklin 20-yard field goal. Eagles 20–7.

Top passers

- DAL – Danny White – 12/31, 127 yards, INT
- PHI – Ron Jaworski – 9/29, 91 yards, 2 INT

Top rushers

- DAL – Robert Newhouse – 7 rushes, 44 yards
- PHI – Wilbert Montgomery – 26 rushes, 194 yards, TD

Top receivers

- DAL – Preston Pearson – 2 receptions, 32 yards
- PHI – Rodney Parker – 4 receptions, 31 yards

1980 NFC Championship Game.

Although Philadelphia quarterback Ron Jaworski completed only nine of 29 passes for 91 yards and was intercepted twice, running back Wilbert Montgomery led the Eagles to a victory by rushing for 194 yards and a touchdown. Dallas had been the highest scoring team in the NFL during the regular season, but against the Eagles defense, they could only gain 206 yards and score a single touchdown. They also fumbled five times, losing three of them.

Dallas was forced to a three and out on their opening drive, and the kick from quarterback Danny White (who also served as the team's punter) went just 26 yards before John Sciarra returned it to the Cowboys 42-yard line. One play later, Montgomery scored on a 42-yard rushing touchdown. The Eagles earned themselves chances to score on their next two drives. However, they were stopped both times and their special teams unit failed to capitalize. First, they drove to the Dallas 23-yard line, only to have Tony Franklin's field goal attempt blocked by Dallas cornerback Aaron Mitchell. Then they drove to the Cowboys 16-yard line, where Harvey Martin sacked Jaworski on third down and a high snap on the field goal try sailed right through Jaworski's hands.

Midway through the second quarter, White, who had been held to negative passing yardage, finally got the Cowboys going on a 10-play, 68-yard drive, completing an 18-yard screen pass to Tony Dorsett and a 12-yarder to Drew Pearson before Dorsett wrapped it up with a 3-yard touchdown run to tie the game. The score would remain 7–7 at halftime, due to another blown scoring chance by the Eagles when Jaworski's touchdown pass to Harold Carmichael was canceled out by a 15-yard personal foul penalty on guard Woody Peoples.

In the third quarter, the first turnover of the game occurred when Philadelphia's Billy Campfield recovered a fumbled punt return from James Jones. Dallas quickly took the ball back with Anthony Dickerson's interception, but they only held on for a few plays before White lost a fumble due to a massive hit from Carl Hairston, which defensive end Dennis Harrison recovered on the Dallas 11-yard line to set up Franklin's 26-yard field goal. Dallas seemed to be in position to respond when tight end Jay Saldi made a leaping catch on the Eagles 40-yard line for a 28-yard gain, White's longest completion of the day. On the next play rookie cornerback Roynell Young stripped the ball from Dorsett, and linebacker Jerry Robinson returned it 22 yards to the Dallas 38-yard line. Six plays later, running back Leroy Harris scored a 9-yard touchdown to give the Eagles a 17–7 lead. Later on, Montgomery's 55-yard carry put the Eagles in position to put the game away, but Mitchell kept Dallas' chances alive by intercepting a pass from Jaworski in the end zone.

Despite the interception, the Cowboys' offense was still unable to move the ball. For the rest of the game, the Cowboys never made it into Eagles territory, and after Philadelphia put together a 62-yard drive to score the final points of the game on Franklin's 20-yard field goal with 2:10 remaining, Young intercepted a pass from White on their final play of the game with 30 seconds remaining.

The Eagles, as the home team, elected to wear their road white jerseys instead of their home green jerseys so as to force Dallas to wear their rarely used blue jerseys rather than their familiar white jerseys; through the years, the Cowboys' blue jerseys were said to be jinxed since they often lost wearing them – especially in Super Bowl V. This would be the last game in which the Cowboys wore their royal blue jerseys; in 1981, they debuted a new navy blue uniform with a significantly different and darker shade of blue than that still used for the numbers on their white jerseys.

Montgomery finished with more all-purpose yards (208) then the entire Cowboys offense. This was the first time Dallas had ever allowed an opposing player to rush for over 100 yards in team postseason history. This would be the Eagles' last playoff victory until the 1992 season. Super Bowl XV began a five-game postseason losing streak for the franchise.

This was the first postseason meeting between the Cowboys and Eagles.

==== AFC: Oakland Raiders 34, San Diego Chargers 27 ====
Oakland Raiders vs. San Diego Chargers – Game summary

Quarter	1	2	3	4	Total
Raiders	21	7	3	3	34
Chargers	7	7	10	3	27

at Jack Murphy Stadium, San Diego, California

- Game time: 4:00 p.m. EST
- Game weather: 71 °F (22 °C), mostly cloudy
- Game attendance: 52,675
- Referee: Cal Lepore
- TV announcers (NBC): Dick Enberg (play-by-play) and Merlin Olsen (color commentator)

Game information

First quarter

- OAK – Raymond Chester 65-yard pass from Jim Plunkett (Chris Bahr kick). Raiders 7–0.
- SD – Charlie Joiner 48-yard pass from Dan Fouts (Rolf Benirschke kick). Tied 7–7.
- OAK – Jim Plunkett 5-yard run (Chris Bahr kick). Raiders 14–7.
- OAK – Kenny King 21-yard pass from Jim Plunkett (Chris Bahr kick). Raiders 21–7.

Second quarter

- OAK – Mark van Eeghen 3-yard run (Chris Bahr kick). Raiders 28–7.
- SD – Charlie Joiner 8-yard pass from Dan Fouts (Rolf Benirschke kick). Raiders 28–14.

Third quarter

- SD – Rolf Benirschke 26-yard field goal. Raiders 28–17.
- SD – Chuck Muncie 6-yard run (Rolf Benirschke kick). Raiders 28–24.
- OAK – Chris Bahr 27-yard field goal. Raiders 31–24.

Fourth quarter

- OAK – Chris Bahr 33-yard field goal. Raiders 34–24.
- SD – Rolf Benirschke 27-yard field goal. Raiders 34–27.

Top passers

- OAK – Jim Plunkett – 14/18, 261 yards, 2 TD
- SD – Dan Fouts – 22/45, 336 yards, 2 TD, 2 INT

Top rushers

- OAK – Mark van Eeghen – 20 rushes, 85 yards, TD
- SD – Mike Thomas – 12 rushes, 48 yards

Top receivers

- OAK – Raymond Chester – 5 receptions, 102 yards, TD
- SD – Charlie Joiner – 6 receptions, 130 yards, 2 TD

Oakland built a 28–7 first half lead, but had to hold off a furious comeback attempt to become the second wild card team in NFL history to make it to the Super Bowl.

In the first quarter alone, Raiders quarterback Jim Plunkett completed 5/6 passes for 160 yards and two touchdowns, while also rushing for a score. On the third play of the game, Plunkett threw a pass that bounced off the hands of Kenny King and into the arms of tight end Raymond Chester, who took off to the end zone for a 65-yard touchdown reception. The Chargers seemed primed to respond, as Dan Fouts completed a 55-yard pass to Ron Smith on their first play of the next drive, but Lester Hayes, who recorded 13 interceptions in the regular season and four in the previous two playoff games, picked off a pass from Fouts and returned it 16 yards to the Raiders 25-yard line. However, the Chargers defense forced a punt and Fouts made up for his mistake on the next possession, hooking up with Charlie Joiner for a 48-yard touchdown to tie the game at 7.

Oakland stormed back with 21 unanswered points. First, Plunkett's 48-yard completion to receiver Cliff Branch on third down and 20 set off a 7-play, 76-yard drive that ended with his 5-yard touchdown run. Then the Raiders defense forced a punt, and Ira Matthews returned Rick Partridge's 41-yard kick 14 yards to the Chargers 49-yard line. Four plays later, Plunkett's 21-yard touchdown pass to King made the score 21–7 with 1:35 left in the first quarter. San Diego took the ball back and drove to the Raiders 21-yard line, featuring a 28-yard completion from tight end Kellen Winslow to John Jefferson on a trick play, but safety Burgess Owens ended the drive with an interception. Following a punt, San Diego running back Mike Thomas lost a fumble that was recovered by linebacker Ted Hendricks on the Chargers 29-yard line, and the Raiders capitalized with Plunkett's 23-yard completion to Branch leading to another touchdown, this one on a 3-yard run by Mark van Eeghen, to build a 28–7 lead. Following Hank Bauer's 27-yard kickoff return to the 36-yard line, San Diego drove 64 yards in 13 plays, including a 24-yard reception by Thomas, to score on Fouts' 8-yard touchdown completion to Joiner, cutting their deficit to 28–14 with 1:05 left in the half.

The Chargers continued to cut away at the Raiders lead in the second half, driving 68 yards in 12 plays on their opening drive. Two dropped passes by Jefferson in the end zone spoiled their chances for a touchdown, but Rolf Benirschke kicked a 26-yard field goal, making the score 28-17. Their defense then forced a punt, which Mike Fuller returned 28 yards to the Raiders 41-yard line. From there, San Diego took the ball all the way to the end zone, scoring on a 7-play drive that ended on Chuck Muncie's 6-yard touchdown run, cutting the deficit to 28–24. Oakland responded with a 68-yard drive, including a 22-yard completion from Plunkett to King, leading to Chris Bahr's 27-yard field goal to retake their 7-point lead. Then after a three and out, Matthews returned Partridge's next punt six yards to the Oakland 49, where the Raiders added a 33-yard field goal from Bahr to increase their lead to 34–24 with 9:46 left in the game.

The Chargers then countered with a 72-yard drive ending with Benirschke's 27-yard field goal. The Raiders defense was exhausted and they implored their offense by saying "don't let them have the damn ball back"! The Raiders then held onto the ball for the last 6:52 of the game on a 15-play drive (12 runs, one pass, two quarterback kneels), with Plunkett scrambling twice on third down to pick up key first downs, to clinch the victory.

Plunkett finished the game completing 14 of 18 passes for 261 yards and two touchdowns. Chester caught five passes for a career postseason high 102 yards and a touchdown. Fouts threw for 336 yards and two scores, but was intercepted twice. Joiner caught six passes for 130 yards and two touchdowns.

This was the first postseason meeting between the Raiders and Chargers.

== Super Bowl XV: Oakland Raiders 27, Philadelphia Eagles 10 ==
Super Bowl XV – Oakland Raiders vs. Philadelphia Eagles – Game summary

Quarter	1	2	3	4	Total
Raiders (AFC)	14	0	10	3	27
Eagles (NFC)	0	3	0	7	10

at Louisiana Superdome, New Orleans, Louisiana

- Date: January 25, 1981
- Game attendance: 76,135
- Referee: Ben Dreith
- TV announcers (NBC): Dick Enberg (play-by-play) and Merlin Olsen (color commentator)

This was the first Super Bowl meeting between the Raiders and Eagles.
