= 1980 Philadelphia Eagles season =

NFL team season

- Owner: Leonard Tose
- General manager: Jim Murray
- Head coach: Dick Vermeil
- Defensive coordinator: Marion Campbell
- Home stadium: Veterans Stadium

Results
- Record: 12–4
- Division place: 1st NFC East
- Playoffs: Won Divisional Playoffs (vs. Vikings) 31–16; Won NFC Championship (vs. Cowboys) 20–7; Lost Super Bowl XV (vs. Raiders) 10–27

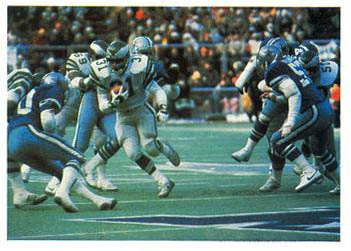
The Eagles defeated the Cowboys in the 1980 NFC Championship Game and earned their first Super Bowl appearance.

The 1980 Philadelphia Eagles season was the team's 48th season in the National Football League (NFL). The Eagles won twelve of their sixteen games, winning their division for the first time in twenty years. The Eagles started the season winning eleven of their first twelve games, only to finish the season losing three of their final four. Still, the 12–4 record (the best finish in the Vermeil era) was good enough to win the NFC East division title for the first time in franchise history since the NFC East had been formed.

The 1980 season marked the Eagles' third consecutive playoff appearance under coach Dick Vermeil, and culminated in the team's first Super Bowl appearance, where they were defeated by the Oakland Raiders 27–10. The 1980 NFC Championship long stood as the proudest moment of the Super Bowl era in Eagles history until they won Super Bowl LII 37 years later. After the season, Luther Blue retired.

== Offseason ==
=== NFL draft ===
After going 11–5 in the 1979 season and making the playoffs as a wildcard team, the Eagles found themselves looking to improve in 1980 through the NFL Draft.

The 1980 NFL draft was the procedure by which National Football League teams selected amateur college football players. It is officially known as the NFL Annual Player Selection Meeting. The draft was held April 29–30, 1979. As was started with the 1977 NFL Draft, this consisted of 12 rounds over two days. ESPN covered all 12 rounds live for the first time.

The Philadelphia Eagles had the 23rd to 25th pick in each of the 12 rounds. The Eagles drafted 10 players.

1980 Philadelphia Eagles Draft
Round	Selection	Player	Position	College
1	23	Roynell Young	DB	Alcorn State University
2	53	Perry Harrington	RB	Jackson State University
5	135	Nate Rivers	RB	South Carolina State
6	161	Greg Murtha	T	University of Minnesota
7	188	Terrell Ward	DB	San Diego State
8	218	Mike Curcio	LB	Temple University
9	245	Bob Harris	T	Bowling Green
11	298	Lee Jukes	WR	North Carolina State
11	302	Thomas Brown	DE	Baylor University
12	329	Howard Fields	DB	Baylor

=== Undrafted free agents ===
1980 undrafted free agents of note
Player	Position	College
Alan Blanshan	Defensive tackle	Minnesota
Jeff Bostic	Center	Clemson
Pat King	Punter	Drake

== Personnel ==
=== Staff ===
1980 Philadelphia Eagles staff
Front office: Owner – Leonard Tose; General Manager – Jim Murray; Director of Player Personnel – Carl Peterson; Head coaches: Head Coach – Dick Vermeil; Offensive coaches: Quarterbacks – Sid Gillman; Running Backs – Billy Joe; Receivers – Dick Coury; Tight Ends – Lynn Stiles; Offensive Line – Ken Iman; Offensive Line – Jerry Wampfler	Defensive coaches: Defensive Coordinator – Marion Campbell; Defensive Line – Chuck Clausen; Linebackers – George Hill; Defensive Backs – Fred Bruney; Special teams coaches: Special Teams – Lynn Stiles

=== Roster ===
1980 Philadelphia Eagles roster
Quarterbacks (QB): 16 Rob Hertel; 7 Ron Jaworski; 9 Joe Pisarcik; Running backs (RB): 37 Billy Campfield; 33 Louie Giammona; 35 Perry Harrington; 20 Leroy Harris; 31 Wilbert Montgomery; 39 Bob Torrey; Wide receivers (WR): 17 Harold Carmichael; 81 Scott Fitzkee; 83 Rodney Parker; 85 Charlie Smith; Tight ends (TE): 84 Keith Krepfle; 88 John Spagnola	Offensive linemen (OL): 63 Ron Baker G; 73 Steve Kenney T; 50 Guy Morriss C; 69 Woody Peoples G; 62 Petey Perot G; 76 Jerry Sisemore T; 61 Mark Slater C; 75 Stan Walters T; Defensive linemen (DL): 97 Thomas Brown DE; 71 Ken Clarke NT; 78 Carl Hairston DE; 68 Dennis Harrison DE; 87 Claude Humphrey DE; 65 Charlie Johnson NT	Linebackers (LB): 66 Bill Bergey ILB; 95 John Bunting OLB; 59 Al Chesley ILB; 55 Frank LeMaster ILB; 52 Ray Phillips OLB; 56 Jerry Robinson OLB; 51 Reggie Wilkes OLB; Defensive backs (DB): 27 Richard Blackmore CB; 46 Herm Edwards CB; 24 Zac Henderson SS; 41 Randy Logan SS; 21 John Sciarra FS; 22 Brenard Wilson FS; 43 Roynell Young CB; Special teams (ST): 1 Tony Franklin K; 4 Max Runager P	Reserve: 38 Larry Barnes RB (IR); 34 James Betterson RB (IR); 80 Luther Blue WR (IR); 67 Lem Burnham DE (IR); 57 Mike Curcio LB (IR); 86 Ken Dunek TE (IR); 89 Wally Henry WR (IR); 30 Mike Hogan RB (NF-Inj.); 82 Ray Sydnor TE (IR); 42 Steve Wagner S (IR); 26 Terrell Ward CB (IR); Rookies in italics

== Regular season ==
The 1980 season schedule was set based on how the Eagles finished the previous season: 2nd in NFC East. The way the schedule was laid out, 4 of the 5 teams in the same division could end up having 10 to 14 common opponents during the 1980 season. Also, when the last regular-season game was over, each team knew who its opponents would be the next year.

- A home and away series vs the teams in its own division: Cowboys, Giants, Cardinals and Redskins = 8 games
- Each of the top 4 teams in the NFC East from the previous season played the top 4 teams in the AFC West from the previous season: Chargers, Broncos, Seahawks and Raiders = 4 games
- Each of the 2nd and 3rd place teams in the NFC East from the previous season (Eagles and Redskins) played the 2nd and 3rd place teams in the NFC Central and NFC West from the previous season: Bears, Vikings, Saints and Falcons = 4 games

=== Schedule ===
Week	Date	Opponent	Result	Record	Location	Attendance
1	September 7, 1980	Denver Broncos	**W** 27–6	1–0	Veterans Stadium	70,307
2	September 14, 1980	at Minnesota Vikings	**W** 42–7	2–0	Metropolitan Stadium	46,460
3	September 22, 1980	**New York Giants**	**W** 35–3	3–0	Veterans Stadium	70,767
4	September 28, 1980	at **St. Louis Cardinals**	**L** 24–14	3–1	Busch Memorial Stadium	49,079
5	October 5, 1980	**Washington Redskins**	**W** 24–14	4–1	Veterans Stadium	69,044
6	October 12, 1980	at **New York Giants**	**W** 31–16	5–1	Giants Stadium	71,051
7	October 19, 1980	**Dallas Cowboys**	**W** 17–10	6–1	Veterans Stadium	70,696
8	October 26, 1980	Chicago Bears	**W** 17–14	7–1	Veterans Stadium	68,752
9	November 2, 1980	at Seattle Seahawks	**W** 27–20	8–1	Kingdome	61,047
10	November 9, 1980	at New Orleans Saints	**W** 34–21	9–1	Louisiana Superdome	44,340
11	November 16, 1980	at **Washington Redskins**	**W** 24–0	10–1	RFK Stadium	51,897
12	November 23, 1980	Oakland Raiders	**W** 10–7	11–1	Veterans Stadium	68,535
13	November 30, 1980	at San Diego Chargers	**L** 22–21	11–2	Jack Murphy Stadium	51,567
14	December 7, 1980	Atlanta Falcons	**L** 20–17	11–3	Veterans Stadium	70,205
15	December 14, 1980	**St. Louis Cardinals**	**W** 17–3	12–3	Veterans Stadium	68,969
16	December 21, 1980	at **Dallas Cowboys**	**L** 35–27	12–4	Texas Stadium	62,548

Note: Intra-division opponents are in bold text.

== Game summaries ==
=== Week 1 ===
Team	1	2	3	4	Total
Broncos	0	0	6	0	6
• Eagles	7	13	0	7	27

- Date: September 7
- Location: Veterans Stadium
- Game start: 4:00 p.m. EST
- Game attendance: 70,307
- Game weather: Partly cloudy; 82 °F (28 °C)
- Referee: Chuck Heberling

Scoring summary
Q1	PHI	Carmichael 56 yard pass from Jaworski (Franklin kick)	PHI 7–0
Q2	PHI	Franklin 17 yard field goal	PHI 10–0
Q2	PHI	Franklin 35 yard field goal	PHI 13–0
Q2	PHI	Fitzkee 16 yard pass from Jaworski (Franklin kick)	PHI 20–0
Q3	DEN	Steinfort 44 yard field goal	PHI 20–3
Q3	DEN	Steinfort 43 yard field goal	PHI 20–6
Q4	PHI	Spagnola 11 yard pass from Jaworski (Franklin kick)	PHI 27–6

=== Week 2 ===
Team	1	2	3	4	Total
• Eagles	14	0	14	14	42
Vikings	0	7	0	0	7

- Date: September 14
- Location: Metropolitan Stadium
- Game start: 1:00 p.m. EST
- Game attendance: 46,460
- Game weather: Rain, 57 °F (14 °C); wind 12 mph (19 km/h)
- Referee: Red Cashion
- TV announcers (CBS): Vin Scully and George Allen

Scoring summary
Q1	PHI	Harris 2 yard run (Franklin kick)	PHI 7–0
Q1	PHI	Montgomery 72 yard run (Franklin kick)	PHI 14–0
Q2	MIN	Rashad 16 yard pass from Kramer (Danmeier kick)	PHI 14–7
Q3	PHI	Harris 4 yard run (Franklin kick)	PHI 21–7
Q3	PHI	Montgomery 1 yard run (Franklin kick)	PHI 28–7
Q4	PHI	Fitzkee 45 yard pass from Jaworski (Franklin kick)	PHI 35–7
Q4	PHI	Carmichael 13 yard pass from Jaworski (Franklin kick)	PHI 42–7

=== Week 3 ===
Team	1	2	3	4	Total
Giants	3	0	0	0	3
• Eagles	7	14	7	7	35

- Date: September 22
- Location: Veterans Stadium
- Game start: 9:00 p.m. EST
- Game attendance: 70,767
- Game weather: Partly cloudy; 78 °F (26 °C)
- Referee: Bob Frederic
- TV announcers (ABC): Howard Cosell, Frank Gifford and Fran Tarkenton

Scoring summary
Q1	NYG	Danelo 50 yard field goal	NYG 3–0
Q1	PHI	Montgomery 3 yard pass from Jaworski (Franklin kick)	PHI 7–3
Q2	PHI	Carmichael 22 yard pass from Jaworski (Franklin kick)	PHI 14–3
Q2	PHI	Harris 2 yard run (Franklin kick)	PHI 21–3
Q3	PHI	Smith 12 yard pass from Jaworski (Franklin kick)	PHI 28–3
Q4	PHI	Montgomery 1 yard run (Franklin kick)	PHI 35–3

=== Week 4 ===
Team	1	2	3	4	Total
Eagles	0	7	0	7	14
• Cardinals	7	3	7	7	24

- Date: September 28
- Location: Busch Stadium
- Game start: 1:00 p.m. EST
- Game attendance: 49,079
- Game weather: 63 °F (17 °C); wind 7 mph (11 km/h)
- Referee: Gordon McCarter
- TV announcers (CBS): Gary Bender and John Madden

Scoring summary
Q1	STL	70 yard interception return (Little kick)	STL 7–0
Q2	PHI	Jaworski 1 yard run (Franklin kick)	Tie 7–7
Q2	STL	Little 31 yard field goal	STL 10–7
Q3	STL	Anderson 14 yard run (Little kick)	STL 17–7
Q4	STL	Anderson 37 yard run (Little kick)	STL 24–7
Q4	PHI	Krepfle 9 yard pass from Jaworski (Franklin kick)	STL 24–14

=== Week 5 ===
Team	1	2	3	4	Total
Redskins	7	0	0	7	14
• Eagles	7	14	3	0	24

- Date: October 5
- Location: Veterans Stadium
- Game start: 1:00 p.m. EST
- Game attendance: 69,044
- Game weather: Cloudy; 61 °F (16 °C)
- Referee: Pat Haggerty
- TV announcers (CBS): Gary Bender and John Madden

Scoring summary
Q1	WSH	Thompson 54 yard pass from Theismann (Moseley kick)	WSH 7–0
Q1	PHI	Harris 51 yard pass from Jaworski (Franklin kick)	Tie 7–7
Q2	PHI	Montgomery 3 yard run (Franklin kick)	PHI 14–7
Q2	PHI	Carmichael 6 yard pass from Jaworski (Franklin kick)	PHI 21–7
Q3	PHI	Franklin 39 yard field goal	PHI 24–7
Q4	WSH	Claitt 10 yard run (Moseley kick)	PHI 24–14

=== Week 6 ===
Team	1	2	3	4	Total
• Eagles	0	3	14	14	31
Giants	7	9	0	0	16

- Date: October 12
- Location: Giants Stadium
- Game start: 1:00 p.m. EST
- Game attendance: 71,051
- Game weather: 57 °F (14 °C); wind 16 mph (26 km/h)
- Referee: Gene Barth
- TV announcers (CBS): Vin Scully and George Allen

Scoring summary
Q1	NYG	Simms 1 yard run (Danelo kick)	NYG 7–0
Q2	NYG	Perkins 15 yard pass from Simms (kick failed)	NYG 13–0
Q2	PHI	Franklin 41 yard field goal	NYG 13–3
Q2	NYG	Danelo 42 yard field goal	NYG 16–3
Q3	PHI	Giammona 1 yard run (Franklin kick)	NYG 16–10
Q3	PHI	Harrington 19 yard run (Franklin kick)	PHI 17–16
Q4	PHI	Giammona 3 yard run (Franklin kick)	PHI 24–16
Q4	PHI	Krepfle 6 yard pass from Jaworski (Franklin kick)	PHI 31–16

=== Week 7 ===
Team	1	2	3	4	Total
Cowboys	7	3	0	0	10
• Eagles	0	10	0	7	17

- Date: October 19
- Location: Veterans Stadium
- Game start: 1:00 p.m. EST
- Game attendance: 70,696
- Game weather: Sunny; 69 °F (21 °C)
- Referee: Cal Lepore
- TV announcers (CBS): Pat Summerall and Tom Brookshier

Scoring summary
Q1	DAL	Hegman recovered fumble in end zone (Septien kick)	DAL 7–0
Q2	PHI	Franklin 35 yard field goal	DAL 7–3
Q2	PHI	Carmichael 5 yard pass from Jaworski (Franklin kick)	PHI 10–7
Q2	DAL	Septien 33 yard field goal	Tie 10–10
Q4	PHI	Smith 15 yard pass from Jaworski (Franklin kick)	PHI 17–10

=== Week 8 ===
Team	1	2	3	4	Total
Bears	0	0	14	0	14
• Eagles	7	0	7	3	17

- Date: October 26
- Location: Veterans Stadium
- Game start: 4:00 p.m. EST
- Game attendance: 68,752
- Game weather: Cloudy; 46 °F (8 °C)
- Referee: Red Cashion
- TV announcers (CBS): Pat Summerall and Tom Brookshier

Scoring summary
Q1	PHI	Campfield 2 yard pass from Jaworski (Franklin kick)	PHI 7–0
Q3	PHI	Giammona 2 yard pass from Jaworski (Franklin kick)	PHI 14–0
Q3	CHI	Harper 1 yard run (Thomas kick)	PHI 14–7
Q3	CHI	Evans 3 yard run (Thomas kick)	Tie 14–14
Q4	PHI	Franklin 18 yard field goal	PHI 17–14

=== Week 9 ===
Team	1	2	3	4	Total
• Eagles	0	7	10	10	27
Seahawks	6	0	7	7	20

- Date: November 2
- Location: Kingdome
- Game start: 4:00 p.m. EST
- Game attendance: 61,047
- Game weather: Indoors (dome)
- Referee: Jerry Markbreit
- TV announcers (CBS): Gary Bender and John Madden

Scoring summary
Q1	SEA	Herrera 21 yard field goal	SEA 3–0
Q1	SEA	Herrera 31 yard field goal	SEA 6–0
Q2	PHI	Campfield 1 yard run (Franklin kick)	PHI 7–6
Q3	SEA	Largent 27 yard pass from Zorn (Herrera kick)	SEA 13–7
Q3	PHI	Smith 15 yard pass from Jaworski (Franklin kick)	PHI 14–13
Q3	PHI	Franklin 39 yard field goal	PHI 17–13
Q4	SEA	Doornik 9 yard run (Herrera kick)	SEA 20–17
Q4	PHI	Campfield 5 yard pass from Jaworski (Franklin kick)	PHI 24–20
Q4	PHI	Franklin 25 yard field goal	PHI 27–20

=== Week 10 ===
Team	1	2	3	4	Total
• Eagles	0	17	7	10	34
Saints	7	7	7	0	21

- Date: November 9
- Location: Louisiana Superdome
- Game start: 4:00 p.m. EST
- Game attendance: 44,340
- Game weather: Indoors (dome)
- Referee: Gordon McCarter
- TV announcers (CBS): Curt Gowdy and Hank Stram

Scoring summary
Q1	NO	Williams 24 yard pass from Manning (Ricardo kick)	NO 7–0
Q2	PHI	Carmichael 10 yard pass from Jaworski (Franklin kick)	Tie 7–7
Q2	NO	Chandler 17 yard pass from Manning (Ricardo kick)	NO 14–7
Q2	PHI	Franklin 32 yard field goal	NO 14–10
Q2	PHI	Carmichael 6 yard pass from Jaworski (Franklin kick)	PHI 17–14
Q3	PHI	Carmichael 25 yard pass from Jaworski (Franklin kick)	PHI 24–14
Q3	NO	Williams 8 yard pass from Manning (Ricardo kick)	PHI 24–21
Q4	PHI	Franklin 30 yard field goal	PHI 27–21
Q4	PHI	Hogan 2 yard run (Franklin kick)	PHI 30–21

=== Week 11 ===
Team	1	2	3	4	Total
• Eagles	14	3	7	0	24
Redskins	0	0	0	0	0

- Date: November 16
- Location: RFK Stadium
- Game start: 1:00 p.m. EST
- Game attendance: 51,897
- Game weather: 45 °F (7 °C); wind 16 mph (26 km/h)
- Referee: Jerry Seeman
- TV announcers (CBS): Gary Bender and John Madden

Scoring summary
Q1	PHI	Krepfle 8 yard pass from Jaworski (Franklin kick)	PHI 7–0
Q1	PHI	Spagnola 14 yard pass from Jaworski (Franklin kick)	PHI 14–0
Q2	PHI	Franklin 38 yard field goal	PHI 17–0
Q4	PHI	Robinson 59 yard fumble return (Franklin kick)	PHI 24–0

=== Week 12 ===
Team	1	2	3	4	Total
Raiders	0	0	0	7	7
• Eagles	0	0	3	7	10

- Date: November 23
- Location: Veterans Stadium
- Game start: 1:00 p.m. EST
- Game attendance: 68,535
- Game weather: Cloudy; 44 °F (7 °C)
- Referee: Jim Tunney
- TV announcers (NBC): Dick Enberg and Bob Trumpy

Scoring summary
Q3	PHI	Franklin 51 yard field goal	PHI 3–0
Q4	OAK	Branch 86 yard pass from Plunkett (Bahr kick)	OAK 7–3
Q4	PHI	Montgomery 3 yard run (Franklin kick)	PHI 10–7

=== Week 13 ===
Team	1	2	3	4	Total
Eagles	0	0	7	14	21
• Chargers	9	10	0	3	22

- Date: November 30
- Location: Jack Murphy Stadium
- Game start: 4:00 p.m. EST
- Game attendance: 51,567
- Game weather: 61 °F (16 °C); wind 6 mph (9.7 km/h)
- Referee: Chuck Heberling
- TV announcers (CBS): Curt Gowdy and Hank Stram

Scoring summary
Q1	SD	Winslow 14 yard pass from Fouts (kick failed)	SD 6–0
Q1	SD	Benirschke 34 yard field goal	SD 9–0
Q2	SD	Winslow 17 yard pass from Fouts (Benirschke kick)	SD 16–0
Q2	SD	Benirschke 45 yard field goal	SD 19–0
Q3	PHI	Montgomery 1 yard run (Franklin kick)	SD 19–7
Q4	SD	Benirschke 42 yard field goal	SD 22–7
Q4	PHI	Krepfle 16 yard pass from Jaworski (Franklin kick)	SD 22–14
Q4	PHI	Montgomery 11 yard pass from Jaworski (Franklin kick)	SD 22–21

=== Week 14 ===
Team	1	2	3	4	Total
• Falcons	3	7	7	3	20
Eagles	0	14	0	3	17

- Date: December 7
- Location: Veterans Stadium
- Game start: 1:00 p.m. EST
- Game attendance: 70,205
- Game weather: Light rain; 55 °F (13 °C)
- Referee: Pat Haggerty

Scoring summary
Q1	ATL	Mazzetti 26 yard field goal	ATL 3–0
Q2	PHI	Carmichael 22 yard pass from Jaworski (Franklin kick)	PHI 7–3
Q2	PHI	Spagnola 15 yard pass from Giammona (Franklin kick)	PHI 14–3
Q2	ATL	Francis 11 yard pass from Bartkowski (Mazzetti kick)	PHI 14–10
Q3	ATL	Cain 12 yard pass from Bartkowski (Mazzetti kick)	ATL 17–14
Q4	PHI	Franklin 40 yard field goal	Tie 17–17
Q4	ATL	Mazzetti 37 yard field goal	ATL 20–17

=== Week 15 ===
Team	1	2	3	4	Total
Cardinals	0	0	0	3	3
• Eagles	0	0	7	10	17

- Date: December 14
- Location: Veterans Stadium
- Game start: 1:00 p.m. EST
- Game attendance: 68,969
- Game weather: Sunny; 44 °F (7 °C)
- Referee: Bob Frederic
- TV announcers (CBS): Vin Scully and George Allen

Scoring summary
Q3	PHI	Montgomery 9 yard run (Franklin kick)	PHI 7–0
Q4	PHI	Franklin 19 yard field goal	PHI 10–0
Q4	STL	O'Donoghue 25 yard field goal	PHI 10–3
Q4	PHI	Giammona 1 yard run (Franklin kick)	PHI 17–3

=== Week 16 ===
Team	1	2	3	4	Total
Eagles	0	0	10	17	27
• Cowboys	7	14	7	7	35

- Date: December 21
- Location: Texas Stadium
- Game start: 4:00 p.m. EST
- Game attendance: 62,548
- Game weather: 28 °F (−2 °C); wind 9 mph (14 km/h)
- Referee: Dick Jorgensen
- TV announcers (CBS): Pat Summerall and Tom Brookshier

Scoring summary
Q1	DAL	White 1 yard run (Septien kick)	DAL 7–0
Q2	DAL	Hill 36 yard pass from White (Septien kick)	DAL 14–0
Q2	DAL	P. Pearson 9 yard pass from White (Septien kick)	DAL 21–0
Q3	PHI	Giammona 1 yard run (Franklin kick)	DAL 21–7
Q3	DAL	D. Pearson 11 yard pass from White (Septien kick)	DAL 28–7
Q3	PHI	Franklin 29 yard field goal	DAL 28–10
Q4	DAL	DuPree 15 yard pass from White (Septien kick)	DAL 35–10
Q4	PHI	Parker 30 yard pass from Jaworski (Franklin kick)	DAL 35–17
Q4	PHI	Franklin 19 yard field goal	DAL 35–20
Q4	PHI	Montgomery 6 yard run (Franklin kick)	DAL 35–27

- Harold Carmichael's streak of games with a pass caught is stopped. Despite losing this game, the Eagles clinched the NFC East Division on a quirky tie-breaker scenario because they lost by less than 25 points. The only caveat to losing by less than 25 points compared to winning this game outright was that the Eagles conceded the number one seed in the NFC to the Atlanta Falcons (who had also lost during this same week). The close defeat however proved to be less significant compared to winning this game outright as their eventual run to the Super Bowl would not have changed due to restrictions regarding teams from the same division meeting in the Divisional Round, and Dallas defeating both the Rams in the Wild Card Round (Dallas could only face Atlanta regardless of seeding), and the Falcons in the Divisional Round (the NFC Championship Game would have still been held in Philadelphia).

== Standings ==
NFC East
	W	L	T	PCT	DIV	CONF	PF	PA	STK
^{(2)} Philadelphia Eagles	12	4	0	.750	6–2	9–3	384	222	L1
^{(4)} Dallas Cowboys	12	4	0	.750	6–2	9–3	454	311	W1
Washington Redskins	6	10	0	.375	4–4	5–7	261	293	W3
St. Louis Cardinals	5	11	0	.313	2–6	4–10	299	350	L2
New York Giants	4	12	0	.250	2–6	3–9	249	425	L2

== Postseason ==
=== Schedule ===
Round	Date	Opponent (seed)	Result	Record	Venue	Recap
Wild Card	First-round bye					
Divisional	January 3, 1981	Minnesota Vikings (3)	W 31–16	1–0	Veterans Stadium	Recap
NFC Championship	January 11, 1981	Dallas Cowboys (4)	W 20–7	2–0	Veterans Stadium	Recap
Super Bowl XV	January 25, 1981	vs. Oakland Raiders (A4)	L 10–27	2–1	Louisiana Superdome	Recap

=== Game summaries ===
==== NFC Divisional Playoffs: vs. (3) Minnesota Vikings ====
NFC Divisional Playoffs: (3) Minnesota Vikings at (2) Philadelphia Eagles – Game summary

Quarter	1	2	3	4	Total
Vikings	7	7	2	0	16
Eagles	0	7	14	10	31

at Veterans Stadium, Philadelphia, Pennsylvania

- Date: January 3, 1981
- Game time: 12:30 p.m. EST
- Game weather: 29 °F (−2 °C), cloudy
- Game attendance: 68,434
- Referee: Jim Tunney
- TV announcers (CBS): Pat Summerall (play-by-play) and Tom Brookshier (color commentator)

Game information

First quarter

- MIN – Sammy White 30-yard pass from Tommy Kramer (Rick Danmeier kick). Vikings 7–0.

Second quarter

- MIN – Ted Brown 1-yard run (Rick Danmeier kick). Vikings 14–0.
- PHI – Harold Carmichael 9-yard pass from Ron Jaworski (Tony Franklin kick). Vikings 14–7.

Third quarter

- PHI – Wilbert Montgomery 8-yard run (Tony Franklin kick). Tied 14–14.
- MIN – Safety, Doug Martin and Matt Blair tackled Ron Jaworski in end zone. Vikings 16–14.
- PHI – Wilbert Montgomery 5-yard run (Tony Franklin kick). Eagles 21–16.

Fourth quarter

- PHI – Tony Franklin 33-yard field goal. Eagles 24–16.
- PHI – Perry Harrington 2-yard run (Tony Franklin kick). Eagles 31–16.

Top passers

- MIN – Tommy Kramer – 19/39, 209 yards, TD, 5 INT
- PHI – Ron Jaworski – 17/38, 190 yards, TD, 2 INT

Top rushers

- MIN – Doug Paschal – 4 rushes, 26 yards
- PHI – Wilbert Montgomery – 26 rushes, 74 yards, 2 TD

Top receivers

- MIN – Rickey Young – 6 receptions, 57 yards
- PHI – Harold Carmichael – 7 receptions, 84 yards, TD

==== NFC Championship: vs. (4) Dallas Cowboys ====
NFC Championship: (4) Dallas Cowboys at (2) Philadelphia Eagles – Game summary

Quarter	1	2	3	4	Total
Cowboys	0	7	0	0	7
Eagles	7	0	10	3	20

at Veterans Stadium, Philadelphia, Pennsylvania

- Date: January 11, 1981
- Game time: 12:30 p.m. EST
- Game weather: 17 °F (−8 °C), sunny, breezy
- Game attendance: 71,522
- Referee: Jerry Markbreit
- TV announcers (CBS): Pat Summerall (play-by-play) and Tom Brookshier (color commentator)

Game information

First quarter

- PHI – Wilbert Montgomery 42-yard run (Tony Franklin kick). Eagles 7–0.

Second quarter

- DAL – Tony Dorsett 3-yard run (Rafael Septién kick). Tied 7–7.

Third quarter

- PHI – Tony Franklin 26-yard field goal. Eagles 10–7.
- PHI – Leroy Harris 9-yard run (Tony Franklin kick). Eagles 17–7.

Fourth quarter

- PHI – Tony Franklin 20-yard field goal. Eagles 20–7.

Top passers

- DAL – Danny White – 12/31, 127 yards, INT
- PHI – Ron Jaworski – 9/29, 91 yards, 2 INT

Top rushers

- DAL – Robert Newhouse – 7 rushes, 44 yards
- PHI – Wilbert Montgomery – 26 rushes, 194 yards, TD

Top receivers

- DAL – Preston Pearson – 2 receptions, 32 yards
- PHI – Rodney Parker – 4 receptions, 31 yards

Veterans Stadium during the 1980 NFC Championship Game against the Dallas Cowboys, January 11, 1981.

==== Super Bowl XV: vs. (A4) Oakland Raiders ====
Super Bowl XV: (A4) Oakland Raiders vs. (N2) Philadelphia Eagles – Game summary

Quarter	1	2	3	4	Total
Raiders	14	0	10	3	27
Eagles	0	3	0	7	10

at Louisiana Superdome, New Orleans, Louisiana

- Date: January 25, 1981
- Game time: 6:00 p.m. EST
- Game weather: 70 °F (21 °C), played indoors, domed stadium
- Game attendance: 76,135
- Referee: Ben Dreith
- TV announcers (NBC): Dick Enberg (play-by-play) and Merlin Olsen (color commentator)

Game information

First quarter

- OAK – Cliff Branch 2-yard pass from Jim Plunkett (Chris Bahr kick). Raiders 7–0.
- OAK – Kenny King 80-yard pass from Jim Plunkett (Chris Bahr kick). Raiders 14–0.

Second quarter

- PHI – Tony Franklin 30-yard field goal. Raiders 14–3.

Third quarter

- OAK – Cliff Branch 29-yard pass from Jim Plunkett (Chris Bahr kick). Raiders 21–3.
- OAK – Chris Bahr 46-yard field goal. Raiders 24–3.

Fourth quarter

- PHI – Keith Krepfle 8-yard pass from Ron Jaworski (Tony Franklin kick). Raiders 24–10.
- OAK – Chris Bahr 35-yard field goal. Raiders 27–10.

Top passers

- OAK – Jim Plunkett – 13/21, 261 yards, 3 TD
- PHI – Ron Jaworski – 18/38, 291 yards, TD, 3 INT

Top rushers

- OAK – Mark Van Eeghen – 18 rushes, 75 yards
- PHI – Wilbert Montgomery – 16 rushes, 44 yards

Top receivers

- OAK – Cliff Branch – 2 receptions, 32 yards
- PHI – Wilbert Montgomery – 6 receptions, 91 yards

== Awards and honors ==
- Ron Jaworski, Bert Bell Award
