= 1980 Minnesota Vikings season =

NFL team season

- General manager: Mike Lynn
- Head coach: Bud Grant
- Offensive coordinator: Jerry Burns
- Defensive coordinator: Bob Hollway
- Home stadium: Metropolitan Stadium

Results
- Record: 9–7
- Division place: 1st NFC Central
- Playoffs: Lost Divisional Playoffs (at Eagles) 16–31
- All-Pros: LB Matt Blair (1st team)
- Pro Bowlers: LB Matt Blair; WR Ahmad Rashad

Uniform
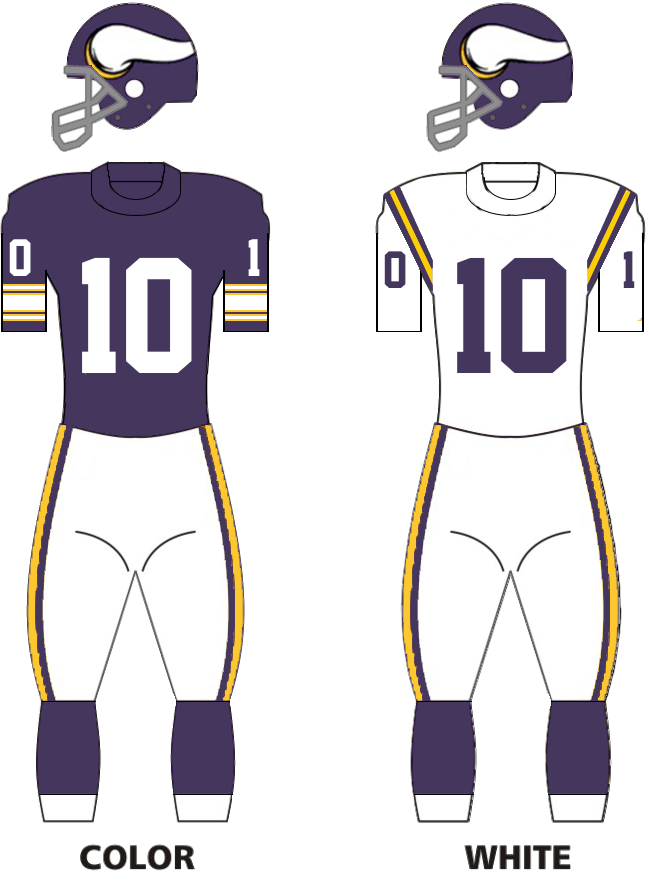

The 1980 season was the Minnesota Vikings' 20th in the National Football League and their 14th under head coach Bud Grant. The Vikings improved on their 7–9 record from last year with a 9–7 record, equal to that of the Detroit Lions, but won the NFC Central division title on the conference record tiebreaker. In the Divisional Playoffs, the Vikings lost to the Philadelphia Eagles 31–16.

The most dramatic game of the season came in a Week 15 home game against Cleveland, with Minnesota's record standing at 8–6. The Vikings trailed 23–9 early in the fourth quarter, but with five seconds left in regulation, despite missing two field goals and two extra points in the game, they were on the Cleveland 46-yard line, having reduced the Browns' lead to one point. Quarterback Tommy Kramer threw a Hail Mary pass that Ahmad Rashad caught at the 2-yard line before backing into the end zone to give Minnesota a 28–23 win.

== Offseason ==
=== 1980 draft ===
1980 Minnesota Vikings Draft
Draft order		Player name	Position	College	Notes
Round	Selection	Player name	Position	College	Notes
1	9	Doug Martin	Defensive tackle	Washington	
2	30	Willie Teal	Cornerback	LSU	From 49ers (Note: The Vikings traded their second- and third-round selections (39th and 65th overall) to the San Francisco 49ers in exchange for a second-round selection (30th overall).)
2	39	Traded to the San Francisco 49ers			
3	65	Traded to the San Francisco 49ers			
3	68	Brent Boyd	Center	UCLA	From Saints (Note: The Vikings traded RB Steve Riley to the New Orleans Saints in exchange for third- and fifth-round selections (68th and 122nd overall).)
4	92	Dennis Johnson	Linebacker	USC	
5	121	Doug Paschal	Running back	North Carolina	
5	122	Paul Jones	Running back	California	From Saints
6	148	Ray Yakavonis	Defensive end	East Stroudsburg	
7	174	Henry Johnson	Linebacker	Georgia Tech	
8	204	Traded to the Seattle Seahawks (Note: The Vikings traded an eighth-round selection (205th overall) to the Seattle Seahawks in exchange for DL Steve Niehaus.)			
9	232	Dennis Mosley	Running back	Iowa	In lieu of #231 (passed) (Note: The Vikings originally had the 231st overall selection, but passed, allowing Buffalo to move up and Minnesota to choose 232nd overall.)
10	258	Kenny Brown	Wide receiver	Nebraska	
11	288	Sam Harrell	Running back	East Carolina	
12	315	Thomas Lane	Defensive back	Florida A&M	

=== Undrafted free agents ===
1980 undrafted free agents of note
Player	Position	College
Fred Bock	Kicker	St. John's
Robert Meyer	Defensive back	Wisconsin–River Falls
Ryan Mullaney	Defensive end	UNLV
Leven Weiss	Linebacker	Iowa

== Roster ==
1980 Minnesota Vikings roster
Quarterbacks (QB): 12 Steve Dils; 9 Tommy Kramer; Running backs (RB): 23 Ted Brown; 35 Robert Miller; 40 Doug Paschal; 31 Eddie Payton; 34 Rickey Young; Wide receivers (WR): 80 Terry LeCount; 87 Kevin Miller; 28 Ahmad Rashad; 85 Sammy White; Tight ends (TE): 82 Bob Bruer; 81 Joe Senser; 38 Bob Tucker	Offensive linemen (OL): 62 Brent Boyd G; 61 Wes Hamilton G; 56 Dave Huffman T; 58 Jim Langer C; 68 Melvin Mitchell G; 78 Steve Riley T; 67 Dennis Swilley C; 71 John Vella T; 73 Ron Yary T; Defensive linemen (DL): 75 Randy Holloway DE; 79 Doug Martin DE; 77 Mark Mullaney DE; 76 Dave Roller DT; 69 Doug Sutherland DT; 72 James White DT	Linebackers (LB): 59 Matt Blair OLB; 52 Dennis Johnson OLB; 53 Henry Johnson OLB; 54 Fred McNeill OLB; 50 Jeff Siemon MLB; 55 Scott Studwell MLB; Defensive backs (DB): 24 Larry Brune SS; 20 Bobby Bryant CB; 45 Tommy Hannon SS; 25 Kurt Knoff FS; 49 Keith Nord FS; 37 Willie Teal CB; 27 John Turner CB; 43 Nate Wright CB; Special teams (ST): 8 Greg Coleman P; 7 Rick Danmeier K	Reserve: 26 Marvin Cobb S (NF-Ill.); 36 Sam Harrell RB (IR); 51 Jim Hough G (IR); 74 Frank Myers T (IR); 89 Ken Sanders DE (IR); 91 Ray Yakavonis DE (IR); Rookies in italics

== Preseason ==
Week	Date	Opponent	Result	Record	Venue	Attendance
1	August 9	San Diego Chargers	W 21–17	1–0	Metropolitan Stadium	45,179
2	August 18	at Kansas City Chiefs	L 10–14	1–1	Arrowhead Stadium	39,879
3	August 23	at Miami Dolphins	W 17–10	2–1	Miami Orange Bowl	36,116
4	August 30	Cleveland Browns	W 38–16	3–1	Metropolitan Stadium	47,262

== Regular season ==
=== Schedule ===
Week	Date	Opponent	Result	Record	Venue	Attendance
1	September 7	Atlanta Falcons	**W** 24–23	1–0	Metropolitan Stadium	44,773
2	September 14	Philadelphia Eagles	**L** 7–42	1–1	Metropolitan Stadium	46,460
3	September 21	at **Chicago Bears**	**W** 34–14	2–1	Soldier Field	59,983
4	September 28	at **Detroit Lions**	**L** 7–27	2–2	Silverdome	80,291
5	October 5	Pittsburgh Steelers	**L** 17–23	2–3	Metropolitan Stadium	47,583
6	October 12	**Chicago Bears**	**W** 13–7	3–3	Metropolitan Stadium	46,751
7	October 19	at Cincinnati Bengals	**L** 0–14	3–4	Riverfront Stadium	44,487
8	October 26	at **Green Bay Packers**	**L** 3–16	3–5	Lambeau Field	56,191
9	November 2	at Washington Redskins	**W** 39–14	4–5	Robert F. Kennedy Memorial Stadium	52,060
10	November 9	**Detroit Lions**	**W** 34–0	5–5	Metropolitan Stadium	46,264
11	November 16	**Tampa Bay Buccaneers**	**W** 38–30	6–5	Metropolitan Stadium	46,032
12	November 23	**Green Bay Packers**	**L** 13–25	6–6	Metropolitan Stadium	47,234
13	November 30	at New Orleans Saints	**W** 23–20	7–6	Louisiana Superdome	30,936
14	December 7	at **Tampa Bay Buccaneers**	**W** 21–10	8–6	Tampa Stadium	65,649
15	December 14	Cleveland Browns	**W** 28–23	9–6	Metropolitan Stadium	42,202
16	December 21	at Houston Oilers	**L** 16–20	9–7	Astrodome	51,064

Note: Intra-division opponents are in bold text.

=== Game summaries ===
==== Week 15: vs Cleveland Browns ====
Week 15: Cleveland Browns at Minnesota Vikings – Game summary

Quarter	1	2	3	4	Total
Browns	7	6	3	7	**23**
**Vikings**	0	0	9	19	**28**

at Metropolitan Stadium, Bloomington, Minnesota

- Date: December 14, 1980
- Game time: 12:00 p.m. CST
- Game weather: 23 °F (−5 °C)
- Referee: Ben Dreith
- TV announcers (NBC): Charlie Jones and Len Dawson

Game information
**First quarter**
- CLE – Calvin Hill 18-yard pass from Brian Sipe (Don Cockroft kick). Browns 7–0.

**Second quarter**

- CLE – Brian Sipe 2-yard run (kick failed). Browns 13–0.

**Third quarter**

- MIN – Joe Senser 31-yard pass from Tommy Kramer (kick failed). Browns 13–6.
- CLE – Don Cockroft 32-yard field goal. Browns 16–6.
- MIN – Rick Danmeier 24-yard field goal. Browns 16–9.

**Fourth quarter**

- CLE – Cleo Miller 1-yard run (Don Cockroft kick). Browns 23–9.
- MIN – Ted Brown 7-yard pass from Tommy Kramer (kick failed). Browns 23–15.
- MIN – Ahmad Rashad 12-yard pass from Tommy Kramer (Rick Danmeier kick). Browns 23–22.
- MIN – Ahmad Rashad 46-yard pass from Tommy Kramer (kick failed). Vikings 28–23.

Trailing 23–9 entering the fourth quarter the Vikings came back and won on a desperation Hail Mary pass from quarterback Tommy Kramer to wide receiver Ahmad Rashad to clinch the NFC Central Division title in what became known as the "Miracle at the Met".

=== Standings ===
NFC Central
	W	L	T	PCT	DIV	CONF	PF	PA	STK
Minnesota Vikings^{(3)}	9	7	0	.563	5–3	8–4	317	308	L1
Detroit Lions	9	7	0	.563	5–3	9–5	334	272	W2
Chicago Bears	7	9	0	.438	5–3	7–5	304	264	W1
Tampa Bay Buccaneers	5	10	1	.344	1–6–1	4–7–1	271	341	L3
Green Bay Packers	5	10	1	.344	3–4–1	4–7–1	231	371	L4

== Postseason ==
Week	Date	Opponent	Result	Venue	Attendance
Divisional	January 3	at Philadelphia Eagles	L 16–31	Veterans Stadium	68,434

== Statistics ==
=== Team leaders ===
Category	Player(s)	Value
Passing yards	Tommy Kramer	3,582
Passing touchdowns	Tommy Kramer	19
Rushing yards	Ted Brown	912
Rushing touchdowns	Ted Brown	8
Receiving yards	Ahmad Rashad	1,095
Receiving touchdowns	Joe Senser	7
Points	Rick Danmeier	81
Kickoff return yards	Eddie Payton	1,184
Punt return yards	Eddie Payton	251
Interceptions	John Turner	6

=== League rankings ===
Category	Total yards	Yards per game	NFL rank (out of 28)
Passing offense	3,688	230.5	3rd
Rushing offense	1,642	102.6	27th
Total offense	5,330	333.1	11th
Passing defense	3,400	212.5	24th
Rushing defense	2,456	153.5	25th
Total defense	5,856	366.0	26th
