= Wilbert Montgomery =

American football player and coach (born 1954)

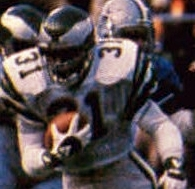
- Montgomery with the Philadelphia Eagles in 1980

No. 31, 28
- Position: Running back

Personal information
- Born: September 16, 1954 (age 72); Greenville, Mississippi, U.S.
- Listed height: 5 ft 10 in (1.78 m)
- Listed weight: 195 lb (88 kg)

Career information
- High school: Greenville
- College: Abilene Christian (1973–1976)
- NFL draft: 1977: 6th round, 154th overall pick

Career history

Playing
- Philadelphia Eagles (1977–1984); Detroit Lions (1985)

Coaching
- St. Louis Rams (1997–2005) Running backs & tight ends coach; Detroit Lions (2006–2007) Running backs coach; Baltimore Ravens (2008–2013) Running backs coach; Cleveland Browns (2014–2015) Running backs coach

Awards and highlights
- As a player: 2× Second-team All-Pro (1978, 1979); 2× Pro Bowl (1978, 1979); Philadelphia Eagles Hall of Fame; NAIA national champion (1973); First-team Little All-American (1973); As a coach: 2× Super Bowl champion (XXXIV, XLVII)

Career NFL statistics
- Rushing yards: 6,789
- Rushing average: 4.4
- Rushing touchdowns: 45
- Receptions: 273
- Receiving yards: 2,502
- Receiving touchdowns: 12
- Stats at Pro Football Reference
- College Football Hall of Fame

Wilbert Montgomery (born September 16, 1954) is an American former professional football player who was a running back for nine years with the Philadelphia Eagles and the Detroit Lions of the National Football League (NFL). He played college football for the Abilene Christian Wildcats. After his playing career, Montgomery was the running backs and tight ends coach for the St. Louis Rams (1997–2005) and running backs coach for the Lions (2006–2007), Baltimore Ravens (2008–2013) and Cleveland Browns (2014–2015).

== Playing career ==
=== College ===
An outstanding athlete at Abilene Christian University, Montgomery was a four-year starter at running back and set the all-time National Association of Intercollegiate Athletics record for touchdowns with 76. He broke the record for touchdowns by a freshman with 37, and helped lead the Wildcats to the NAIA Division I National Championship in 1973. That same year, he was featured in "Faces in the Crowd" in the November 12 issue of Sports Illustrated.

=== NFL ===
Montgomery was selected 154th overall by the Philadelphia Eagles in the sixth round of the 1977 NFL draft. Wearing number 31, Montgomery played eight seasons with Philadelphia, shattering most Eagles' rushing records and leading the club in rushing six times. He concluded his NFL career with the Detroit Lions in 1985, and still holds or previously held seven Philadelphia rushing records, including: career attempts (1,465), rushing yards (6,538, broken by LeSean McCoy in 2014), attempts in a season (338 in 1979, broken by Ricky Watters in 1996), rushing yards in a season (1,512 in 1979, since broken by LeSean McCoy in 2013), career 100-yard rushing games (26), 100-yard rushing games in a season (8 in 1981), and touchdowns in a game (4). In the 1980 NFC championship game, Montgomery rushed for a then-franchise postseason record 194 yards, leading the team to Super Bowl XV, the first Super Bowl in team history. In 1979, Montgomery led the NFL with 2,012 all-purpose yards (rushing, receiving, returns). Over his NFL career, he accumulated 6,789 yards rushing, 2,502 receiving, 814 kickoff return yards, 57 touchdowns (45 rushing, 12 receiving, 1 kickoff return), and two Pro Bowl invitations (1978–79).

== NFL career statistics ==
Legend
	Led the league
**Bold**	Career high

Year	Team	Games		Rushing						Receiving					Fumbles	
Year	Team	GP	GS	Att	Yds	Avg	Y/G	Lng	TD	Rec	Yds	Avg	Lng	TD	Fum	FR
1977	PHI	**14**	1	45	183	4.1	13.1	27	2	3	18	6.0	8	0	4	0
1978	PHI	14	14	259	1,220	4.7	87.1	47	**9**	34	195	5.7	23	1	6	0
1979	PHI	**16**	**16**	**338**	**1,512**	4.5	**94.5**	62	**9**	41	494	12.0	**53**	**5**	**14**	**2**
1980	PHI	12	12	193	778	4.0	64.8	72	8	50	407	8.1	31	2	3	1
1981	PHI	15	15	286	1,402	**4.9**	93.5	41	8	49	**521**	10.6	35	2	6	**2**
1982	PHI	8	8	114	515	4.5	64.4	**90**	7	20	258	**12.9**	42	2	3	**2**
1983	PHI	5	1	29	139	4.8	27.8	32	0	9	53	5.9	13	0	1	0
1984	PHI	**16**	15	201	789	3.9	49.3	27	2	**60**	501	8.4	28	0	5	1
1985	DET	7	6	75	251	3.3	35.9	22	0	7	55	7.9	28	0	0	1
Career		107	88	1,540	6,789	4.4	63.4	90	45	273	2,502	9.2	53	12	42	9

== Coaching career ==
=== NFL ===
Montgomery joined the St. Louis Rams' coaching staff as running backs coach in 1997, coaching Pro Bowl running backs Marshall Faulk and Steven Jackson. Under Montgomery's leadership, Faulk moved into 12th place on the NFL's rushing yardage list, and Jackson finished third in the NFL among rookie running backs. He won his first Super Bowl title when the Rams defeated the Tennessee Titans in Super Bowl XXXIV.

At the 2002 NFC Championship game between the Tampa Bay Buccaneers and Philadelphia Eagles at Veterans Stadium, Montgomery was the Eagles’ honorary captain, and introduced to a thunderous ovation prior to the game.

He joined the Ravens in 2008 and was running backs coach through the 2013 season. He won his second Super Bowl title when the Ravens defeated the San Francisco 49ers in Super Bowl XLVII.

Montgomery was hired as running backs coach of the Cleveland Browns on February 6, 2014. He was not retained after Head Coach Mike Pettine was fired.

== Personal life ==
Montgomery is a native of Greenville, Mississippi, and one of four brothers (Fred, Cleotha Montgomery, and Tyrone) who played in the NFL. Montgomery earned the Abilene Christian University Alumni Citation Award in 1979, was inducted onto the inaugural Philadelphia Eagles Honor Roll in 1987, and was inducted into the College Football Hall of Fame in 1996.

Montgomery and his wife Patti have three children, twins Briana and Brendan, and a son, Tavian. Montgomery also has a daughter, Sherrita, and a son Derron, who was a wide receiver for the Iowa State Cyclones and a graduate assistant and assistant wide receivers coach for the Miami Hurricanes. Derron was a wide receivers coach for the Michigan Wolverines, tight ends coach for his father's alma mater Abilene Christian University and is now the offensive quality control - assistant RB's coach for the Minnesota Vikings. Tavian is a current college sophomore, playing cornerback for Northern Arizona University.
