= Thomas Brown (defensive end) =

American football player (born 1957)

No. 97
- Position: Defensive lineman

Personal information
- Born: July 8, 1957 (age 69); Galveston, Texas, U.S.
- Listed height: 6 ft 4 in (1.93 m)
- Listed weight: 247 lb (112 kg)

Career information
- High school: Ball (Galveston)
- College: Baylor
- NFL draft: 1980: 11th round, 302nd overall pick

Career history
- Philadelphia Eagles (1980); Cleveland Browns (1981−1983); Philadelphia Eagles (1983)*
- * Offseason or practice squad member only

Career NFL statistics
- Sacks: 3
- Fumble recoveries: 1
- Stats at Pro Football Reference

Thomas Wayne Brown (born July 8, 1957) is an American former professional football player who was a defensive lineman for three seasons in the National Football League (NFL). He played college football for the Baylor Bears before he was selected by the Philadelphia Eagles in the eleventh round of the 1980 NFL draft. He played for one season for the Eagles (1980) and two seasons for the Cleveland Browns (1981 and 1983).

== Professional career ==
Brown was selected 302nd overall by the Philadelphia Eagles in the eleventh round of the 1980 NFL draft. After the 1980 season, Brown was traded to the Cleveland Browns in exchange for a seventh round selection in the 1983 NFL draft on August 24, 1981. The Eagles used the seventh-round pick on offensive guard Jon Schultheis in 1983. Brown played for the Browns in 1981 and 1983.
