= Leroy Harris (running back) =

American football player (1954–2024)

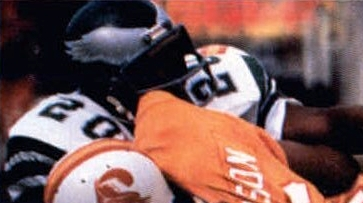
- Harris with the Philadelphia Eagles in 1979

No. 38, 20
- Position: Running back

Personal information
- Born: July 3, 1954; Savannah, Georgia, U.S.
- Died: September 1, 2024 (aged 70); Savannah, Georgia, U.S.
- Listed height: 5 ft 9 in (1.75 m)
- Listed weight: 226 lb (103 kg)

Career information
- High school: Savannah
- College: Arkansas State
- NFL draft: 1977: 5th round, 123rd overall pick

Career history
- Miami Dolphins (1977–1978); Philadelphia Eagles (1979–1982)

Career NFL statistics
- Rushing attempts: 442
- Rushing yards: 1,813
- Rushing TDs: 13
- Stats at Pro Football Reference

Leroy Harris (July 3, 1954 – September 1, 2024) was an American professional football player who was a running back in the National Football League (NFL). He played college football for the Arkansas State Red Wolves.

== College career ==
Following a stint at Fort Scott Community College, Harris played two seasons for the Arkansas State Indians and was selected All-Southland Conference in both 1975 (when the team went 11-0) and 1976 and a I-AA honorable mention All-American in 1976. His 1976 season saw him rush for 1,046 yards on 150 carries with 12 touchdowns.

In two seasons with the Arkansas State, Harris rushed for 1,920 yards on 274 carries (a 7.0 average) and 15 touchdowns. Despite his short time in Jonesboro, he was selected for the All-Time ASU Team (1909–1975), chosen during the 1976 season.

== Professional career ==
Following his collegiate days, Harris was drafted in the fifth round of the 1977 NFL draft by the Miami Dolphins. In his rookie season, Harris had a 77-yard touchdown run against the Baltimore Colts on Monday Night Football, tying a then-Dolphins record for longest run in team history, His 140 rushing yards in that game set a Miami single-game rookie rushing record.

In his 5-year NFL career, Harris rushed for over 1,800 yards and scored 14 touchdowns with the Dolphins and the Philadelphia Eagles, with whom he won the 1980 NFC Championship. He has seven rushing attempts for 14 yards and one pass reception for one yard in Super Bowl XV, which the Eagles lost 27-10 to the Oakland Raiders.

== Personal life ==
Harris in 2011 inductee of the Greater Savannah Athletic Hall of Fame.

Harris died on September 1, 2024.

== NFL career statistics ==
Legend
**Bold**	Career high

=== Regular season ===
Year	Team	Games		Rushing					Receiving				
Year	Team	GP	GS	Att	Yds	Avg	Lng	TD	Rec	Yds	Avg	Lng	TD
1977	MIA	11	5	91	417	4.6	77	**4**	7	29	4.1	11	0
1978	MIA	15	11	**123**	**512**	4.2	51	2	**25**	**211**	8.4	**57**	0
1979	PHI	15	13	107	504	**4.7**	**80**	2	22	107	4.9	15	0
1980	PHI	15	15	104	341	3.3	22	3	15	207	**13.8**	51	**1**
1982	PHI	7	1	17	39	2.3	14	2	3	17	5.7	9	0
		63	45	442	1,813	4.1	80	13	72	571	7.9	57	1

=== Playoffs ===
Year	Team	Games		Rushing					Receiving				
Year	Team	GP	GS	Att	Yds	Avg	Lng	TD	Rec	Yds	Avg	Lng	TD
1978	MIA	1	1	9	43	**4.8**	9	0	1	**21**	**21.0**	**21**	0
1979	PHI	2	2	12	46	3.8	**16**	0	2	17	8.5	15	0
1980	PHI	3	3	**24**	**101**	4.2	12	**1**	**3**	14	4.7	11	0
		6	6	45	190	4.2	16	1	6	52	8.7	21	0
