= Woody Peoples =

American football player (1943–2010)

No. 60, 69
- Position: Guard

Personal information
- Born: August 16, 1943; Birmingham, Alabama, U.S.
- Died: October 12, 2010 (aged 67); Birmingham, Alabama, U.S.
- Listed height: 6 ft 2 in (1.88 m)
- Listed weight: 252 lb (114 kg)

Career information
- High school: Ullman (Birmingham)
- College: Grambling State (1961-1964)
- NFL draft: 1965: undrafted

Career history
- Minnesota Vikings (1965)*; Richmond Rebels (1965); San Francisco 49ers (1968–1975); Philadelphia Eagles (1977–1980)
- * Offseason or practice squad member only

Awards and highlights
- 2× Pro Bowl (1972, 1973); American Football Association's Semi Pro Football Hall of Fame (1989)

Career NFL statistics
- Games played: 168
- Games started: 153
- Stats at Pro Football Reference

Woodrow Peoples Jr. (August 16, 1943 – October 12, 2010) was an American professional football player who was an offensive lineman in the National Football League (NFL). Undrafted after playing college football for the Grambling Tigers, he was a two-time Pro Bowler with the San Francisco 49ers, and a member of the 1980 National Football Conference (NFC) champion Philadelphia Eagles during his 13-year NFL career.

Peoples was inducted into the American Football Association's Semi Pro Football Hall of Fame in 1989.
