= Dennis DeVaughn =

American football player (born 1960)

No. 25, 39
- Position: Defensive back

Personal information
- Born: October 28, 1960 (age 66); Los Angeles, California, U.S.
- Listed height: 5 ft 10 in (1.78 m)
- Listed weight: 175 lb (79 kg)

Career information
- High school: Dallas (TX) Franklin D. Roosevelt
- College: Bishop
- NFL draft: 1982: 5th round, 132nd overall pick

Career history
- Philadelphia Eagles (1982–1983); Houston Gamblers (1985)
- Stats at Pro Football Reference

Dennis Wayne DeVaughn (born October 28, 1960) is an American former professional football player who was a defensive back for the Philadelphia Eagles of the National Football League (NFL) from 1982 to 1983. He also played in the United States Football League (USFL) for the Houston Gamblers in 1985. He played college football for the Bishop Tigers.
