= Perry Harrington =

American football player (born 1958)

No. 35, 36
- Position: Running back

Personal information
- Born: March 13, 1958 (age 68); Bentonia, Mississippi, U.S.
- Listed height: 5 ft 11 in (1.80 m)
- Listed weight: 210 lb (95 kg)

Career information
- College: Jackson State
- NFL draft: 1980: 2nd round, 53rd overall pick

Career history
- Philadelphia Eagles (1980–1983); Cleveland Browns (1984)*; St. Louis Cardinals (1984-1985)
- * Offseason or practice squad member only

Career NFL statistics
- Rushing yards: 683
- Rushing average: 4.4
- Touchdowns: 6
- Stats at Pro Football Reference

Perry Donell Harrington (born March 13, 1958) is an American former professional football player who was a running back in the National Football League (NFL) for the Philadelphia Eagles and St. Louis Cardinals from 1980–1985. He was selected by the Eagles in the second round of the 1980 NFL draft. He played college football for the Jackson State Tigers.

== College career ==
Harrington played college football at Jackson State, where he rushed for 2,132 yards and 26 touchdowns.

== Professional career ==
=== Philadelphia Eagles ===
Harrington was drafted by the Philadelphia Eagles in the second round of the 1980 NFL draft. In his rookie season, he suffered hamstring and thigh injuries and was limited in games. He started in only one game, playing in all but two. In 1981, head coach Dick Vermeil expected Harrington to compete for the starting fullback position and occasionally play halfback. However, Harrington broke his leg in the fourth game of the season after starting in every game of the season. In 1982, Harrington again was expected to compete for the starting fullback job with Hubie Oliver and Leroy Harris. He started in eight games in 1982, playing in nine. He asked for a trade during the 1983 season after starting in only one game the entire season.

=== Cleveland Browns ===
Harrington was traded to the Cleveland Browns on July 23, 1984, for a conditional draft pick in 1985, but was quickly released in the preseason, nullifying the trade.

On September 21, 1984, Harrington was given a tryout for the Miami Dolphins, who needed to replace injured running back Andra Franklin.

=== St. Louis Cardinals ===
Harrington was signed by the St. Louis Cardinals in November 1984. He suffered a knee injury during the 1985 season and was placed on injured reserve on November 20, 1985.
