= Tony Woodruff =

American football player (born 1958)

No. 83, 11
- Position: Wide receiver

Personal information
- Born: November 12, 1958 (age 67); Hazen, Arkansas, U.S.
- Listed height: 6 ft 0 in (1.83 m)
- Listed weight: 178 lb (81 kg)

Career information
- High school: Roosevelt (Fresno, California)
- College: Fresno State
- NFL draft: 1982: 9th round, 244th overall pick

Career history
- Philadelphia Eagles (1982–1984); San Francisco 49ers (1986)*; Calgary Stampeders (1986–1987); New Orleans Saints (1987)*
- * Offseason or practice squad member only

Career NFL statistics
- Receptions: 36
- Receiving yards: 554
- Receiving touchdowns: 5
- Stats at Pro Football Reference

Anthony DeWayne Woodruff (born November 12, 1958) is an American former professional football player who was a wide receiver for three seasons with the Philadelphia Eagles of the National Football League (NFL) from 1982 to 1984. He played college football for the Fresno State Bulldogs and was selected by the Eagles in the ninth round of the 1982 NFL draft. Woodruff was a member of the San Francisco 49ers during training camp in 1986.

== Professional career ==
=== Philadelphia Eagles ===
Woodruff was drafted by the Philadelphia Eagles in the ninth round of the 1982 NFL draft. He played in only one game in 1982. On July 17, 1983, Woodruff broke his collarbone while attempting a diving catch during the first practice session of training camp, and missed the next eight weeks. He was waived on September 2, 1985.

=== San Francisco 49ers ===
Woodruff signed with the San Francisco 49ers on June 25, 1986, but was released on August 16 during training camp.

== Arrest ==
Woodruff was arrested on a cocaine possession charge on May 9, 1986, when police found six grams of cocaine in the car he was driving, shortly before he was signed by the 49ers. He was ordered to stand trial on January 8, 1987. He was placed in a drug diversion program in his hometown of Fresno, California, to avoid prosecution.
