= Roynell Young =

American football player (born 1957)

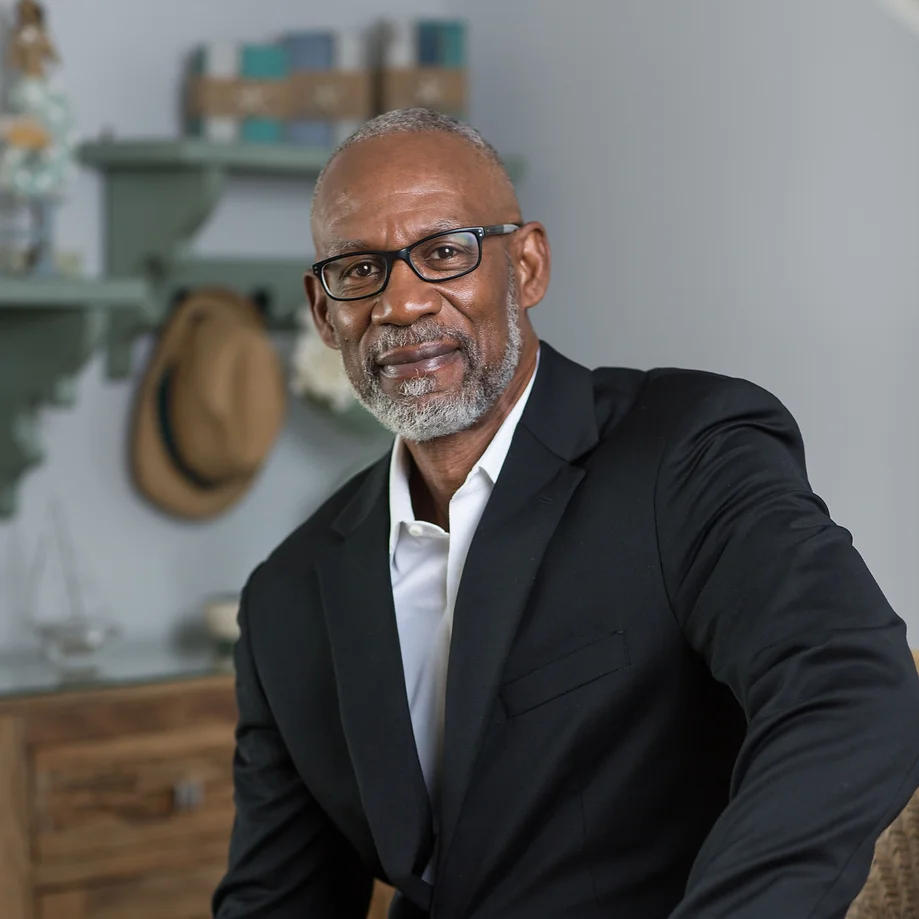

No. 43
- Positions: Safety, Cornerback

Personal information
- Born: December 1, 1957 (age 68); New Orleans, Louisiana, U.S.
- Listed height: 6 ft 1 in (1.85 m)
- Listed weight: 181 lb (82 kg)

Career information
- High school: Cohen (New Orleans}
- College: Alcorn State
- NFL draft: 1980: 1st round, 23rd overall pick

Career history
- Philadelphia Eagles (1980–1988)

Awards and highlights
- Second-team All-Pro (1981); Pro Bowl (1981); PFWA All-Rookie Team (1980)

Career NFL statistics
- Fumble recoveries: 4
- Interceptions: 23
- Stats at Pro Football Reference

Roynell Young (born December 1, 1957) is an American former professional football player who spent his entire career as a safety and cornerback for the Philadelphia Eagles of the National Football League (NFL) from 1980 to 1988. He played college football for the Alcorn State Braves and was selected by the Eagles in the first round (23rd overall) of the 1980 NFL draft. In his rookie year, he played in Super Bowl XV and was selected to the Pro Bowl in his second season. He was one of two players who played in both Super Bowl XV and The Fog Bowl for the Eagles. The other was offensive lineman Ron Baker. Young was inducted to the Alcorn State University Sports Hall of Fame in November 2017.

In 1990, Young founded "Pro-Vision", a youth and community development organization. Originally a youth mentoring program, Young grew Pro-Vision to include an all-male charter middle school, now a co-educational primary and secondary school.
