= Doug Paschal =

American football player (born 1958)

No. 40
- Position: Running back

Personal information
- Born: March 5, 1958 (age 68); Greenville, North Carolina, U.S.
- Listed height: 6 ft 2 in (1.88 m)
- Listed weight: 217 lb (98 kg)

Career information
- High school: J.H. Rose (Greenville)
- College: North Carolina
- NFL draft: 1980: 5th round, 121st overall pick

Career history
- Minnesota Vikings (1980)

Career NFL statistics
- Rushing yards: 53
- Rushing average: 3.5
- Touchdowns: 1
- Stats at Pro Football Reference

Douglas Clyde Paschal (born March 5, 1958) is an American former professional football player who was a running back for the Minnesota Vikings of the National Football League (NFL). He played college football for the North Carolina Tar Heels.

== Personal life ==
Paschal's son, Mark Paschal, also played football for the North Carolina Tar Heels.
