= Richard Blackmore (American football) =

American football player (born 1956)

No. 27, 44
- Position: Defensive back

Personal information
- Born: August 14, 1956 (age 70); Vicksburg, Mississippi, U.S.
- Listed height: 5 ft 10 in (1.78 m)
- Listed weight: 174 lb (79 kg)

Career information
- High school: Vicksburg
- College: Mississippi State
- NFL draft: 1979: undrafted

Career history
- Philadelphia Eagles (1979–1982); San Francisco 49ers (1983)
- Stats at Pro Football Reference

Richard Earl Blackmore (born August 14, 1956) is an American former professional football defensive back in the National Football League (NFL). Blackmore played college football at Mississippi State University. In the NFL, he played five seasons for the Philadelphia Eagles from 1979 to 1982 and the San Francisco 49ers in 1983.

During his season with the San Francisco 49ers, he played in 11 games, collecting 15 tackles.
