= Carl Hairston =

American football player and coach (born 1952)

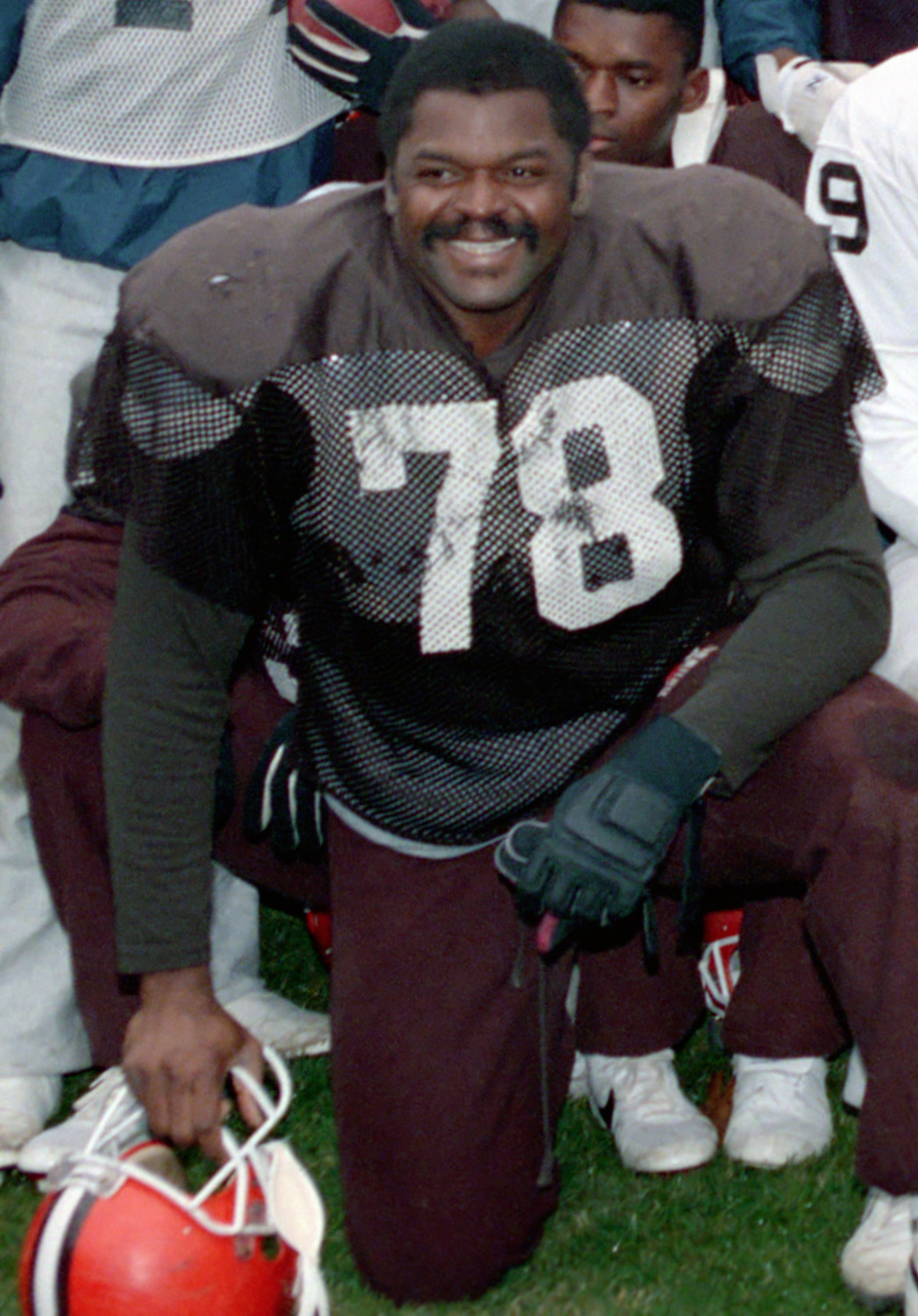
- Hairston with the Cleveland Browns in 1988

No. 78, 98
- Positions: Defensive end, defensive tackle, linebacker

Personal information
- Born: December 15, 1952 (age 73); Martinsville, Virginia, U.S.
- Listed height: 6 ft 3 in (1.91 m)
- Listed weight: 260 lb (118 kg)

Career information
- High school: Martinsville
- College: Maryland State
- NFL draft: 1976: 7th round, 191st overall pick

Career history

Playing
- Philadelphia Eagles (1976–1983); Cleveland Browns (1984–1989); Phoenix Cardinals (1990)

Coaching
- Phoenix Cardinals (1991–1993) College scout; Kansas City Chiefs (1994) Pro scout; Kansas City Chiefs (1995–1996) Defensive line coach; St. Louis Rams (1997–2000) Defensive line coach; Kansas City Chiefs (2001–2005) Defensive line coach; Green Bay Packers (2006–2008) Defensive ends coach; Florida Tuskers (2009) Defensive line coach; Omaha Nighthawks (2010–2011) Defensive line coach; BC Lions (2012–2014) Defensive line coach

Awards and highlights
- Super Bowl champion (XXXIV)

Career NFL statistics
- Sacks: 96
- Fumble recoveries: 10
- Interceptions: 1
- Stats at Pro Football Reference

Carl Blake Hairston (born December 15, 1952) is an American former professional football player and coach in the National Football League (NFL). Hairston played in one Super Bowl and coached in another during his 30 seasons in the league. Among his 15 years in the NFL since the end of his playing career, the daunting Hairston spent 11 seasons as a defensive line coach. He joined the Green Bay Packers from Kansas City, where he spent seven years (1995–1996 and 2001–2005), after sandwiching a four-year term as St. Louis Rams defensive line coach (1997–2000) between his two stints with the Chiefs.

== Professional career ==
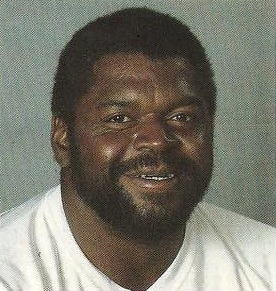
Hairston in 1985

Originally a seventh-round selection (191st overall) by Vermeil's Eagles in 1976, Hairston preceded Reggie White on the Eagles' line (1976–1983), then spent six years in Cleveland (1984–1989) and one final campaign with the Cardinals (1990). In 224 games (184 starts), he posted 94 sacks among 1,141 tackles. He started at defensive for the Eagles end in Super Bowl XV against the Oakland Raiders, one of his 15 postseason contests played.

== Coaching career ==
Originally a pro scout with the Chiefs in 1994, Hairston also spent three seasons (1991–1993) as a college scout with the Phoenix Cardinals, where he had finished his playing career.

Marty Schottenheimer gave Hairston his first full-time coaching position at any level, Chiefs defensive line coach (1995–1996), a role in which he worked with then-quarterbacks coach McCarthy. Tutoring one of the most-feared defensive fronts, Hairston and his players helped the 13-3 Chiefs finish third in the NFL with 47 sacks. Again, his unit produced a pair of Pro Bowl performers, Neil Smith and Dan Saleaumua.

On the field as either a player or coach during all 240 games of Dick Vermeil's career, Hairston first joined the legendary coach for a memorable run with the Rams. In Hairston's first year with the Rams, 1997, he assisted Leslie O'Neal to a ten-sack performance. He also coached a pair of players, Kevin Carter and Grant Wistrom, to double digits in sacks in 2000. One year earlier, when the Rams won Super Bowl XXXIV, his unit provided most of St. Louis' 57 sacks, which tied for the league lead. Carter's NFL-leading 17 sacks that year powered him to the Pro Bowl, where he joined his neighbor on the Rams line, D'Marco Farr. Under Hairston, Chiefs defensive end Jared Allen accumulated 20 sacks from 2004–2005, tied for tenth in the NFL during that period but first among players drafted in 2004, including 23 defensive linemen taken before him. Led by Allen's nine sacks as a rookie, the Chiefs finished 2004 with 41 sacks, seventh in the league.

He joined the Packers as a defensive ends coach in 2006, but was let go—along with the majority of the defensive coaching staff—after a disappointing 2008 season.

After spending time coaching in the United Football League, Hairston was hired as the defensive line coach for the BC Lions of the Canadian Football League. He was let go before the start of the 2015 CFL season.
