= Reggie Wilkes =

American football player (born 1956)

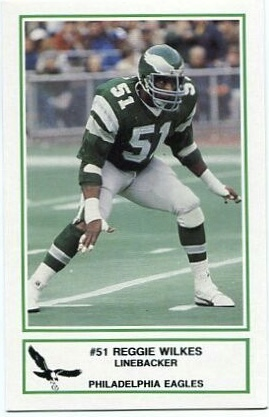

No. 51
- Position: Linebacker

Personal information
- Born: May 27, 1956 (age 70); Pine Bluff, Arkansas, U.S.
- Listed height: 6 ft 4 in (1.93 m)
- Listed weight: 235 lb (107 kg)

Career information
- College: Georgia Tech
- NFL draft: 1978: 3rd round, 66th overall pick

Career history
- Philadelphia Eagles (1978–1985); Atlanta Falcons (1986–1987)

Awards and highlights
- PFWA All-Rookie Team (1978); Georgia Tech Hall of Fame, 1989; Georgia Sports Hall of Fame, 2013; Georgia High School Football Hall of Fame, 2025

Career NFL statistics
- Sacks: 8.5
- Fumble recoveries: 9
- Interceptions: 8
- Stats at Pro Football Reference

Reginald Wayman Wilkes (born May 27, 1956) is an American former professional football player who was a linebacker in the National Football League for the Philadelphia Eagles and Atlanta Falcons. He attended university and played college football at Georgia Tech, graduating with a Bachelor of Science. Wilkes was selected by the Eagles in the third round of the 1978 NFL draft.

Wilkes was all-state at Southwest Atlanta High School and won the 1973 Georgia AA State Championship, heading a defense that allowed 126 yards rushing for the whole season. He went on to letter for Georgia Tech football all four years of college. Upon graduation, he was granted membership into the prestigious ANAK Society, Georgia Tech's honor society, which recognizes exemplary student leaders.

In his rookie NFL year with the Eagles, Wilkes recorded 88 tackles, and along with Pro Bowler Bill Bergey, co-led the team with five fumble recoveries. He was named to the UPI and Pro Football Weekly All-Rookie teams in 1978–79. Wilkes played in every regular season game in his first three NFL seasons, and was a starting outside linebacker on the 1980–81 Philadelphia Eagles Super Bowl XV team. After eight seasons with the Eagles, Wilkes finished his career with two years on the Atlanta Falcons. During his ten seasons in the NFL, Wilkes scored just one point; in a game against the New Orleans Saints on October 11, 1981, he caught a pass from Ron Jaworski for a successful point after touchdown. In 1989, Wilkes was inducted into the Georgia Tech Hall of Fame. In 2013, Wilkes was inducted into the Georgia Sports Hall of Fame.

During his 10-year NFL career, Wilkes worked on the staff of Merrill Lynch advisory group in the off-seasons. Following his retirement from the NFL in 1988, Wilkes and two partners began a registered investment advisory firm, Pro Cap, which specialized in investment and lifestyle management services for professional athletes. They later sold that business to Mercantile Trust Bank, based in Baltimore, and Wilkes maintained his position as senior vice president, heading up its sports and entertainment division. Wilkes returned to Merrill Lynch in 2007 and founded "The Wilkes Sports Management & Advisory Group", before moving to Janney Montgomery Scott, LLC, where he continues to specialize in wealth management of high-net-worth athletes in the NFL and NBA.

Wilkes, and his group, has been featured by numerous news and media outlets, including The New York Times, The Wall Street Journal, Forbes, U.S. News & World Report, CNBC, Reuters, Real Sports with Bryant Gumbel, and the documentary film Broke, which premiered at the 2012 Tribeca/ESPN Sports Film Festival. The film is part of ESPN's 30 for 30 series of sports documentaries. Wilkes is a member of the NFL Alumni Association and is a NFLPA Registered Player Financial Advisor.

Wilkes operates offices in Philadelphia and Atlanta and lives with his wife in Philadelphia.
