= 1980 NFL season =

American football season

Regular season
- Duration: September 7 – December 22, 1980

Playoffs
- Start date: December 28, 1980
- AFC Champions: Oakland Raiders
- NFC Champions: Philadelphia Eagles

Super Bowl XV
- Date: January 25, 1981
- Site: Louisiana Superdome, New Orleans, Louisiana
- Champions: Oakland Raiders

Pro Bowl
- Date: February 1, 1981
- Site: Aloha Stadium

AFC teams: West, Central, East
NFC teams: West, Central, East

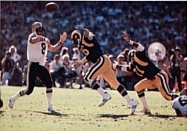
Archie Manning attempting a pass for the New Orleans Saints against the L.A. Rams in 1980.

The 1980 NFL season was the 61st regular season of the National Football League.

Prior to the season in March 1980, fellow NFL owners voted against the proposed move by the Raiders from Oakland, California to Los Angeles. Raiders team owner Al Davis along with the Los Angeles Coliseum sued the NFL charging that they had violated antitrust laws. A verdict in the trial would not be decided until before the 1982 NFL season and thus the 1980 and 1981 Raiders would continue to play in Oakland while awaiting a judgement.

Meanwhile, the season ended at Super Bowl XV played on January 25, 1981, in New Orleans, Louisiana, with these same Oakland Raiders defeating the Philadelphia Eagles 27–10, making them the first Wild Card team ever to win the Super Bowl.

== Oakland Raiders relocation ==
In 1979, Raiders owner Al Davis announced his intention to move the Raiders to Los Angeles. Negotiations between Davis and the Oakland Coliseum regarding potential improvements to the facility came to an end in February 1980. At the NFL's annual meeting on March 10, 1980, team owners voted 22–0 against allowing the move, with the Raiders not participating and five teams abstaining. Davis announced he would ignore the vote and move the team anyway.

The Raiders played the entire 1980 season in Oakland. At a Monday Night Football game against the Denver Broncos on December 1, 1980, Raider fans protested by entering the Oakland Coliseum five minutes after the start of the game and holding up signs stating "Save Our Raiders" at each half's 2-minute warning. By some estimates, "almost two-thirds" of the Coliseum's seats had been empty at the game's kickoff.

The announced move was involved in four lawsuits: the Los Angeles Coliseum Commission sued the NFL charging antitrust violations, the NFL sued the Raiders charging breach of contract, Raider season ticket holders filed a class-action lawsuit, and the City of Oakland filed for eminent domain of the team.

In May 1982, a jury ruled that the NFL had violated antitrust law by attempting to prevent the move, clearing the way for Davis to move the Raiders for the 1982 season. In April 1983, after the team's first season in Los Angeles, a separate jury awarded the Raiders $35 million in damages.

== Draft ==
The 1980 NFL draft was held from April 29 to 30, 1980 at New York City's Sheraton Hotel. With the first pick, the Detroit Lions selected running back Billy Sims from the University of Oklahoma.

== New referee ==
The league added a 15th officiating crew, promoting Bob McElwee to referee. The league previously had 15 crews in 1976 (when the league expanded to 28 teams) and 1977. After referee Bernie Ulman retired after the 1977 season, the league used only 14 crews for the 1978 and 1979 seasons, requiring all 14 of them to be on hand for the weekly workload of 14 games.

== Major rule changes ==
- A ten-second runoff will be implemented when a team commits the following actions to conserve time within the last minute of either half or overtime (with the half/game/regulation ending automatically if 10 or less seconds remain on the game clock; this was changed to after the two-minute warning in the 2017 NFL season):
  - Fouls by either team that prevents the snap (e.g. false start, encroachment, etc.)
  - Intentional grounding
  - Illegal forward pass thrown from beyond the line of scrimmage
  - Throwing a backward pass out of bounds
  - Spiking or throwing the ball in the field of play after a down has ended, except after a touchdown
  - Any other intentional foul that causes the clock to stop.
  - Any excess time-out taken for injuries by either team.

Teams can take a time-out (if available) to prevent the runoff.

- Players are prohibited from striking, swinging, or clubbing to the head, face, or neck. The personal foul could be called whether or not the initial contact was made below the neck.
- A "Guidelines for Captains" section was added to the rules.

== Deaths ==
- September 15 – Jim Tyrer age 41. Offensive tackle for the Kansas City Chiefs and Washington Redskins. Starting tackle for the Chiefs in Super Bowl I and Super Bowl IV

== Records ==
- The New Orleans Saints lost their first 14 games to start the season that matched a record set by the 1976 Tampa Bay Buccaneers

== Division races ==
From 1978 to 1989, ten teams qualified for the playoffs: the winners of each of the divisions, and two wild-card teams in each conference. These are the leaders for each playoff slot, week by week. Teams listed in week 16 indicate playoff participants.

=== National Football Conference ===
Week	NFC East		NFC Central		NFC West		Wild Card		Wild Card	
1	3 teams	1–0	4 teams	1–0	San Francisco	1–0				
2	Philadelphia	2–0	Detroit, Tampa Bay	2–0	San Francisco	2–0				
3	Philadelphia	3–0	Detroit	3–0	San Francisco	3–0	Dallas, Tampa Bay, Minnesota	2–1		
4	Philadelphia, Dallas	3–1	Detroit	4–0	San Francisco	3–1	Philadelphia, Dallas	3–1	4 teams	2–2
5	Philadelphia, Dallas	4–1	Detroit	4–1	San Francisco, Los Angeles, Atlanta	3–2	Philadelphia, Dallas	4–1	San Francisco, Los Angeles, Atlanta	3–2
6	Philadelphia, Dallas	5–1	Detroit	5–1	Los Angeles	4–2	Philadelphia, Dallas	5–1	Minnesota, San Francisco, Atlanta	3–3
7	Philadelphia	6–1	Detroit	5–2	Los Angeles	5–2	Dallas	5–2	Atlanta	4–3
8	Philadelphia	7–1	Detroit	5–3	Los Angeles, Atlanta	5–3	Dallas	6–2	Los Angeles, Atlanta	5–3
9	Philadelphia	8–1	Detroit	6–3	Los Angeles, Atlanta	6–3	Dallas	7–2	Los Angeles, Atlanta	6–3
10	Philadelphia	9–1	Detroit	6–4	Atlanta	7–3	Dallas	7–3	Los Angeles	6–4
11	Philadelphia	10–1	Detroit, Minnesota	6–5	Atlanta	8–3	Dallas	8–3	Los Angeles	7–4
12	Philadelphia	11–1	Detroit	7–5	Atlanta	9–3	Dallas	9–3	Los Angeles	8–4
13	Philadelphia	11–2	Detroit, Minnesota	7–6	Atlanta	10–3	Dallas	10–3	Los Angeles	9–4
14	Philadelphia, Dallas	11–3	Minnesota	8–6	Atlanta	11–3	Philadelphia, Dallas	11–3	Los Angeles	9–5
15	Philadelphia	12–3	Minnesota	9–6	Atlanta	12–3	Dallas	11–4	Los Angeles	10–5
16	Philadelphia	12–4	Minnesota	9–7	Atlanta	12–4	Dallas	12–4	Los Angeles	11–5

=== American Football Conference ===
Week	AFC East		AFC Central		AFC West		Wild Card		Wild Card	
1	3 teams	1–0	Pittsburgh	1–0	San Diego, Oakland	1–0				
2	Buffalo	2–0	Pittsburgh	2–0	San Diego	2–0				
3	Buffalo	3–0	Pittsburgh, Houston	2–1	San Diego	3–0	Pittsburgh, Houston, Miami, New England, Oakland	2–1		
4	Buffalo	4–0	Pittsburgh, Houston	3–1	San Diego	4–0	4 teams	3–1	Baltimore, Cleveland, Oakland, Seattle	2–2
5	Buffalo	5–0	Pittsburgh	4–1	San Diego	4–1	New England	4–1	Miami, Baltimore, Houston, Seattle	3–2
6	New England	5–1	Pittsburgh	4–2	San Diego	4–2	Buffalo	5–1	Baltimore	4–2
7	New England	6–1	Pittsburgh, Cleveland, Houston	4–3	San Diego	5–2	Buffalo	5–2	6 teams	4–3
8	Buffalo	6–2	Cleveland, Houston	5–3	San Diego, Oakland	5–3	New England	6–2	4 teams	5–3
9	New England	7–2	Cleveland, Houston	6–3	San Diego, Oakland	6–3	5 teams	6–3	5 teams	6–3
10	Buffalo	7–3	Houston	7–3	Oakland	7–3	Cleveland, New England	7–3	Cleveland, New England	7–3
11	Buffalo	8–3	Houston	8–3	Oakland	8–3	4 teams	7–4	Miami, Baltimore, Denver	6–5
12	Buffalo	9–3	Houston	8–4	San Diego, Oakland	8–4	4 teams	8–4	4 teams	8–4
13	Buffalo	9–4	Cleveland	9–4	San Diego, Oakland	9–4	San Diego, Oakland	9–4	New England, Pittsburgh, Houston	8–5
14	Buffalo	10–4	Cleveland	10–4	San Diego, Oakland	9–5	San Diego, Oakland, Houston	9–5	San Diego, Oakland, Houston	9–5
15	Buffalo	10–5	Cleveland, Houston	10–5	San Diego, Oakland	10–5	Cleveland, Houston, San Diego, Oakland	10–5	Cleveland, Houston, San Diego, Oakland	10–5
16	Buffalo	11–5	Cleveland	11–5	San Diego	11–5	Oakland	11–5	Houston	11–5

== Regular season ==
=== Scheduling formula ===
Inter-conference
AFC East vs NFC West
AFC Central vs NFC Central
AFC West vs NFC East

Highlights of the 1980 season included:

- Thanksgiving: Two games were played on Thursday, November 27, featuring Chicago at Detroit and Seattle at Dallas. Chicago would prevail in overtime, while Dallas emerged victorious in a 51–7 rout.

=== Final standings ===
AFC East
	W	L	T	PCT	DIV	CONF	PF	PA	STK
^{(3)} Buffalo Bills	11	5	0	.688	4–4	8–4	320	260	W1
New England Patriots	10	6	0	.625	6–2	9–3	441	325	W2
Miami Dolphins	8	8	0	.500	3–5	4–8	266	305	L1
Baltimore Colts	7	9	0	.438	5–3	6–8	355	387	L3
New York Jets	4	12	0	.250	2–6	3–9	302	395	W1

AFC Central
	W	L	T	PCT	DIV	CONF	PF	PA	STK
^{(2)} Cleveland Browns	11	5	0	.688	4–2	8–4	357	310	W1
^{(5)} Houston Oilers	11	5	0	.688	4–2	7–5	295	251	W3
Pittsburgh Steelers	9	7	0	.563	2–4	5–7	352	313	L1
Cincinnati Bengals	6	10	0	.375	2–4	4–8	244	312	L1

AFC West
	W	L	T	PCT	DIV	CONF	PF	PA	STK
^{(1)} San Diego Chargers	11	5	0	.688	6–2	9–3	418	327	W2
^{(4)} Oakland Raiders	11	5	0	.688	6–2	9–3	364	306	W2
Kansas City Chiefs	8	8	0	.500	4–4	6–8	319	336	W1
Denver Broncos	8	8	0	.500	3–5	5–7	310	323	W1
Seattle Seahawks	4	12	0	.250	1–7	3–9	291	408	L9

NFC East
	W	L	T	PCT	DIV	CONF	PF	PA	STK
^{(2)} Philadelphia Eagles	12	4	0	.750	6–2	9–3	384	222	L1
^{(4)} Dallas Cowboys	12	4	0	.750	6–2	9–3	454	311	W1
Washington Redskins	6	10	0	.375	4–4	5–7	261	293	W3
St. Louis Cardinals	5	11	0	.313	2–6	4–10	299	350	L2
New York Giants	4	12	0	.250	2–6	3–9	249	425	L2

NFC Central
	W	L	T	PCT	DIV	CONF	PF	PA	STK
^{(3)} Minnesota Vikings	9	7	0	.563	5–3	8–4	317	308	L1
Detroit Lions	9	7	0	.563	5–3	9–5	334	272	W2
Chicago Bears	7	9	0	.438	5–3	7–5	304	264	W1
Tampa Bay Buccaneers	5	10	1	.344	1–6–1	4–7–1	271	341	L3
Green Bay Packers	5	10	1	.344	3–4–1	4–7–1	231	371	L4

NFC West
	W	L	T	PCT	DIV	CONF	PF	PA	STK
^{(1)} Atlanta Falcons	12	4	0	.750	5–1	10–2	405	272	L1
^{(5)} Los Angeles Rams	11	5	0	.688	5–1	9–3	424	289	W2
San Francisco 49ers	6	10	0	.375	2–4	4–8	320	415	L2
New Orleans Saints	1	15	0	.063	0–6	0–12	291	487	L1

=== Tiebreakers ===
- Cleveland finished ahead of Houston in the AFC Central based on better conference record (8–4 to Oilers' 7–5).
- San Diego finished ahead of Oakland in the AFC West based on better net points in division games (plus 60 net points to Raiders' plus 37).
- San Diego was the top AFC playoff seed based on better conference record than Cleveland and Buffalo (9–3 to Browns' 8–4 and Bills' 8–4).
- Cleveland was the second AFC playoff seed based on better record against common opponents (5–2 to Bills' 5–3).
- Oakland was the first AFC Wild Card based on better conference record than Houston (9–3 to Oilers' 7–5).
- Kansas City finished ahead of Denver in the AFC West based on head-to-head sweep (2–0).
- Philadelphia finished ahead of Dallas in the NFC East based on better net points in division games (plus 84 net points to Cowboys' plus 50).
- Atlanta was the top NFC playoff seed based on head-to-head victory over Philadelphia (1–0).
- Minnesota finished ahead of Detroit in the NFC Central based on better conference record (8–4 to Lions' 9–5).
- Tampa Bay finished ahead of Green Bay in the NFC Central based on better head-to-head record (1–0–1 to Packers' 0–1–1).

== Playoffs ==
Note: The San Diego Chargers (the AFC 1 seed) did not play the Oakland Raiders (the 4 seed) in the Divisional playoff round because both teams were in the same division.

Jan 4 – Cleveland Stadium
4	Oakland	14
Dec 28 – Oakland–Alameda County Coliseum	Jan 11 – Jack Murphy Stadium
2*	Cleveland	12
AFC
5	Houston	7	4	Oakland	34
Jan 3 – Jack Murphy Stadium
4	Oakland	27	1	San Diego	27
AFC Championship
3	Buffalo	14
Jan 25 – Louisiana Superdome
1*	San Diego	20
Divisional round
Wild-card round	A4	Oakland	27
Jan 4 – Atlanta–Fulton County Stadium
N2	Philadelphia	10
Super Bowl XV
4	Dallas	30
Dec 28 – Texas Stadium	Jan 11 – Veterans Stadium
1	Atlanta	27
NFC
5	Los Angeles	13	4	Dallas	7
Jan 3 – Veterans Stadium
4	Dallas	34	2	Philadelphia	20
NFC Championship
3	Minnesota	16
2	Philadelphia	31

== Statistical leaders ==
=== Team ===
Points scored	Dallas Cowboys (454)
Total yards gained	San Diego Chargers (6,410)
Yards rushing	Los Angeles Rams (2,799)
Yards passing	San Diego Chargers (4,531)
Fewest points allowed	Philadelphia Eagles (222)
Fewest total yards allowed	Buffalo Bills (4,101)
Fewest rushing yards allowed	Detroit Lions (1,599)
Fewest passing yards allowed	Washington Redskins (2,171)

== Awards ==
Most Valuable Player	Brian Sipe, quarterback, Cleveland
Coach of the Year	Chuck Knox, Buffalo
Offensive Player of the Year	Earl Campbell, running back, Houston Oilers
Defensive Player of the Year	Lester Hayes, cornerback, Oakland
Offensive Rookie of the Year	Billy Sims, running back, Detroit
Defensive Rookie of the Year	Buddy Curry & Al Richardson, linebackers, Atlanta
Man of the Year	Harold Carmichael, wide receiver, Philadelphia
Comeback Player of the Year	Jim Plunkett, quarterback, Oakland
Super Bowl Most Valuable Player	Jim Plunkett, quarterback, Oakland

== Coaching changes ==
=== Offseason ===
- Baltimore Colts: Mike McCormack replaced the fired Ted Marchibroda.
- Cincinnati Bengals: Forrest Gregg replaced Homer Rice.
- St. Louis Cardinals: Jim Hanifan became the Cardinals' new head coach. Bud Wilkinson was fired after the team started the 1979 season at 3–10, and the team's personnel director Larry Wilson served as interim for the last three games.

=== In-season ===
- New Orleans Saints: Dick Nolan was fired after a 0–12 start, with the 12th loss coming on Monday Night Football vs. the division rival Los Angeles Rams. Offensive line coach Dick Stanfel took over as interim.

== Stadium changes ==
The Los Angeles Rams moved from Los Angeles Memorial Coliseum to Anaheim Stadium

== Uniform changes ==
- The Cincinnati Bengals switched from gray to black face masks. The Bengals also added TV numbers to the sleeves of their jerseys, becoming the last NFL team to do so.
- The Denver Broncos discontinued wearing orange pants with their white jerseys.
- The Houston Oilers dropped the blue pants worn with their white jerseys for this season only.
- The Green Bay Packers switched from gray to forest green face masks.
- The Miami Dolphins switched from gray to aqua face masks.
- The Minnesota Vikings switched from gray to white face masks.
- The New York Giants went to a simpler three-stripe pattern on the sleeve cuffs and jersey collar, while also removing the white stripes on their helmets, leaving the red stripe in the center as the only stripe on the helmet. They also changed the shade of blue on their jerseys from navy to the more familiar royal blue.
- The Seattle Seahawks switched to white shoes.

== Television ==
This was the third year under the league's four-year broadcast contracts with ABC, CBS, and NBC to televise Monday Night Football, the NFC package, and the AFC package, respectively. Phyllis George returned to The NFL Today, replacing Jayne Kennedy (who had previously replaced George in 1978).

NBC made history with an announcerless telecast of the December 20, nationally televised Saturday game between the New York Jets and the Miami Dolphins. With both teams out of playoff contention during the last week of the regular season, NBC executive Don Ohlmeyer used this as a one-shot experiment in an attempt to boost ratings.

Late in the 4th Quarter of a Monday Night Football game between the New England Patriots and the Miami Dolphins on December 8, ABC Monday Night Football announcers Frank Gifford and Howard Cosell broke the news of the passing of former Beatle, John Lennon, who was shot twice outside of his Manhattan apartment.
