= 1977 Philadelphia Eagles season =

NFL team season

- Owner: Leonard Tose
- General manager: Jim Murray
- Head coach: Dick Vermeil
- Home stadium: Veterans Stadium

Results
- Record: 5–9
- Division place: 4th NFC East
- Playoffs: Did not qualify
- Pro Bowlers: LB Bill Bergey

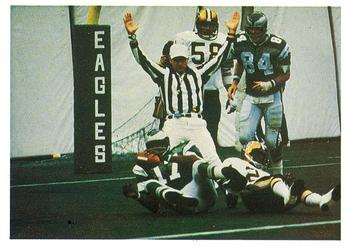
Eagles wide receiver Harold Carmichael scoring a touchdown against the New Orleans Saints in 1977

The 1977 Philadelphia Eagles season was the franchise's 45th season in the National Football League (NFL). The team improved upon their previous output of 4–10, winning five games. Despite the improvement, the team failed to qualify for the playoffs for the seventeenth consecutive season.

== Offseason ==
=== Player selections ===
The table shows the Eagles selections and what picks they had that were traded away and the team that ended up with that pick. It is possible the Eagles' pick ended up with this team via another team that the Eagles made a trade with. Not shown are acquired picks that the Eagles traded away.

| = Pro Bowler (Note: Players are identified as a Pro Bowler if they were selected for the Pro-Bowl at any time in their career.) | = Hall of Famer |

| Round | Pick | Player | Position | School |
| 1 | 8 | Pick Traded to Cincinnati Bengals | | |
| 2 | 35 | Pick Traded to Oakland Raiders | | |
| 3 | 62 | Pick Traded to Dallas Cowboys | | |
| 4 | 92 | Pick Traded to Kansas City Chiefs | | |
| 5 | 119 | Skip Sharp | Defensive back | Kansas |
| 6 | 145 | Kevin Russell | Defensive back | Tennessee State |
| 6 | 154 | Wilbert Montgomery | Running back | Abilene Christian |
| 6 | 158 | Martin Mitchell | Defensive back | Tulane |
| 7 | 175 | Charlie Johnson | Defensive tackle | Colorado |
| 8 | 202 | Cleveland Franklin | Running back | Baylor |
| 9 | 229 | T.J. Humphreys | Guard | Arkansas State |
| 10 | 259 | John Mastronardo | Wide receiver | Villanova |
| 11 | 283 | Rocco Moore | Tackle | Western Michigan |
| 11 | 286 | Mike Cordova | Quarterback | Stanford |
| 12 | 313 | Pick Traded to New York Jets | | |

=== Undrafted free agents ===
1977 undrafted free agents of note
| Player | Position | College |
|---|---|---|
| Mark Mitchell | Defensive back | Georgia |

== Personnel ==
=== Staff / Coaches ===
1977 Philadelphia Eagles staff
| Front office: Owner – Leonard Tose; General manager – Jim Murray; Head coaches: Head coach – Dick Vermeil; Offensive coaches: Offensive Coordinator - Marion Campbell; Running Backs – Johnny Roland; Wide Receivers – Dick Coury; Tight Ends – Carl Petersen; Offensive Line – Duane Putnam; Offensive Line – Ken Iman | Defensive coaches: Defensive Coordinator – John Mazur; Defensive Line – Chuck Clausen; Linebackers – Rod Rust; Linebackers - Bill Davis, Sr.; Defensive Backs / Secondary – John Mazur; Special teams coaches: Special Teams – Ken Iman |

=== Roster ===
1977 Philadelphia Eagles roster
| Quarterbacks (QB): 18 Roman Gabriel; 7 Ron Jaworski; 11 John Walton; Running backs (RB): 34 James Betterson; 30 Cleveland Franklin; 35 Mike Hogan; 32 Herb Lusk; 31 Wilbert Montgomery; 25 Tom Sullivan; Wide receivers (WR): 17 Harold Carmichael; 89 Wally Henry; 83 Vince Papale; 85 Charlie Smith; Tight ends (TE): 84 Keith Krepfle; 86 Richard Osborne | Offensive linemen (OL): 53 Dennis Franks C; 64 Ed George T; 74 Donnie Green T; 72 Wade Key G; 63 Tom Luken G; 50 Guy Morriss C; 71 Dennis Nelson T; 76 Jerry Sisemore G; 75 Stan Walters T; Defensive linemen (DL): 67 Lem Burnham DE; 78 Carl Hairston DE; 62 Johnny Jackson NT; 73 Pete Lazetich NT; 79 Manny Sistrunk DE | Linebackers (LB): 66 Bill Bergey ILB; 95 John Bunting OLB; 59 Tom Ehlers OLB; 55 Frank LeMaster ILB; 54 Drew Mahalic OLB; 57 James Reed ILB; 58 Terry Tautolo ILB; Defensive backs (DB): 46 Herman Edwards CB; 49 Eric Johnson FS; 41 Randy Logan SS; 22 Larry Marshall CB; 48 Martin Mitchell CB; 20 John Outlaw CB; 26 Deac Sanders FS; Special teams (ST): 6 Spike Jones P; 1 Nick Mike-Mayer K | Reserve: 12 Mike Cordova QB (IR); 65 Charlie Johnson NT (IR); -- Rocco Moore T (IR); 82 Ken Payne WR (IR); 39 Kevin Russell CB (IR); 61 Dennis Smelser G (IR); 80 Art Thoms NT (IR); Rookies in italics |

== Schedule ==
| Week | Date | Opponent | Result | Record | Venue | Attendance |
|---|---|---|---|---|---|---|
| 1 | September 18 | Tampa Bay Buccaneers | **W** 13–3 | 1–0 | Veterans Stadium | 63,132 |
| 2 | September 25 | at Los Angeles Rams | **L** 0–20 | 1–1 | Los Angeles Memorial Coliseum | 46,031 |
| 3 | October 2 | at Detroit Lions | **L** 13–17 | 1–2 | Pontiac Silverdome | 57,236 |
| 4 | October 9 | at **New York Giants** | **W** 28–10 | 2–2 | Giants Stadium | 48,824 |
| 5 | October 16 | **St. Louis Cardinals** | **L** 17–21 | 2–3 | Veterans Stadium | 60,535 |
| 6 | October 23 | **Dallas Cowboys** | **L** 10–16 | 2–4 | Veterans Stadium | 65,507 |
| 7 | October 30 | at **Washington Redskins** | **L** 17–23 | 2–5 | RFK Stadium | 55,031 |
| 8 | November 6 | New Orleans Saints | **W** 28–7 | 3–5 | Veterans Stadium | 53,482 |
| 9 | November 13 | **Washington Redskins** | **L** 14–17 | 3–6 | Veterans Stadium | 60,702 |
| 10 | November 20 | at **St. Louis Cardinals** | **L** 16–21 | 3–7 | Busch Memorial Stadium | 48,768 |
| 11 | November 27 | at New England Patriots | **L** 6–14 | 3–8 | Schaefer Stadium | 57,893 |
| 12 | December 4 | at **Dallas Cowboys** | **L** 14–24 | 3–9 | Texas Stadium | 60,289 |
| 13 | December 11 | **New York Giants** | **W** 17–14 | 4–9 | Veterans Stadium | 47,731 |
| 14 | December 18 | New York Jets | **W** 27–0 | 5–9 | Veterans Stadium | 19,241 |
Note: Intra-division opponents are in **bold** text.

=== Standings ===
NFC East
| | W | L | T | PCT | DIV | CONF | PF | PA | STK |
|---|---|---|---|---|---|---|---|---|---|
| Dallas Cowboys^{(1)} | 12 | 2 | 0 | .857 | 7–1 | 11–1 | 345 | 212 | W4 |
| Washington Redskins | 9 | 5 | 0 | .643 | 4–4 | 8–4 | 196 | 189 | W3 |
| St. Louis Cardinals | 7 | 7 | 0 | .500 | 4–4 | 7–5 | 272 | 287 | L4 |
| Philadelphia Eagles | 5 | 9 | 0 | .357 | 2–6 | 4–8 | 220 | 207 | W2 |
| New York Giants | 5 | 9 | 0 | .357 | 3–5 | 5–7 | 181 | 265 | L2 |

== Regular season ==
=== Week 1: vs. Tampa Bay Buccaneers ===
Week One: Tampa Bay Buccaneers at Philadelphia Eagles – Game summary

| Quarter | 1 | 2 | 3 | 4 | Total |
|---|---|---|---|---|---|
| Buccaneers | 0 | 0 | 3 | 0 | 3 |
| Eagles | 0 | 7 | 6 | 0 | 13 |

at Veterans Stadium, Philadelphia, Pennsylvania

- Date: September 18
- Game time: 1:00 p.m. EDT
- Game weather: 74 °F (23 °C)
- Game attendance: 63,132
- Referee: Red Cashion
- TV announcers (CBS): Frank Glieber and Johnny Unitas
- Box score

Game information

First quarter

- No scoring plays

Second quarter

- PHI – Tom Sullivan 7-yard pass from Ron Jaworski (Horst Muhlmann kick). Eagles 7–0.

Third quarter

- TB – Dave Green 22-yard field goal. Eagles 7–3.
- PHI – Keith Krepfle 17-yard pass from Ron Jaworski (kick failed). Eagles 13–3.

Fourth quarter

- No scoring plays

Top passers

- TB – Randy Hedberg – 10/25, 66 yards
- PHI – Ron Jaworski – 14/24, 147 yards, 2 TD, 2 INT

Top rushers

- TB – Ricky Bell – 15 rushes, 53 yards
- PHI – Tom Sullivan – 20 rushes, 56 yards

Top receivers

- TB – Morris Owens – 2 receptions, 21 yards
- PHI – Keith Krepfle – 4 receptions, 77 yards, TD

Quarterback Ron Jaworski threw two touchdown passes and the defense allowed just 152 yards as the Eagles got their first opening-day victory in 10 years. Jaworski, playing for the Eagles for the first time since being traded from the Los Angeles Rams for tight end Charle Young, floated a seven-yard touchdown pass in the first period to running back Tom Sullivan. After Bucs kicker Dave Green kicked a 22-yard field goal in the third quarter to reduce the Eagles' lead to 7–3, Jaworski hit Keith Krepfle with a 17-yard score. The last time the Eagles had won their season opener was 1967 when they beat the Washington Redskins. It was the 15th straight loss for the Buccaneers, who entered the league in 1976 and had yet to win a game. The Eagles' defense, led by defensive end Art Thomas who had recently been obtained from Oakland, and linebacker Bill Bergey, gave up 82 yards on the ground and 70 in the air.

=== Week 3 at Detroit Lions ===
Week 3: Philadelphia Eagles at Detroit Lions

| Quarter | 1 | 2 | 3 | 4 | Total |
|---|---|---|---|---|---|
| Eagles | 0 | 7 | 6 | 0 | 13 |
| Lions | 7 | 3 | 7 | 0 | 17 |

at Pontiac Silverdome, Pontiac, Michigan

- Date: October 2, 1977
- Game time: 2:00 p.m. EST
- TV announcers (CBS): Bob Costas and Nick Buoniconti

Game information

First quarter

Second quarter

Third quarter

Fourth quarter

Top passers

- PHI – Ron Jaworski – 13/24, 207 yards, 2 TD, INT
- DET – Greg Landry – 13/18, 125 yards, 1 TD

Top rushers

- PHI – Mike Hogan – 20 rushes, 67 yards
- DET – Horace King – 20 rushes, 68 yards

Top receivers

- PHI – Harold Carmichael – 4 receptions, 67 yards, TD
- DET – Horace King – 7 receptions, 60 yards

=== Week 4: at New York Giants ===
- at Giants Stadium i East Rutherford, New Jersey
- Television CBS
- Announcers: Pat Summerall, Tom Brookshier

Ron Jaworski hit tight end Keith Krepfle for a 55-yard touchdown pass and Charlie Smith with a 28-yarder, and Herb Lusk ran for touchdowns of 1 and 70 yards in a steady rain as Philadelphia evened their season record at 2–2 with an impressive road victory over the New York Giants. Giants QB Joe Pisarcik, who would later join the Eagles in 1980, threw an 80-yard touchdown pass to Jimmy Robinson for New York's only TD of the day.

=== Week 8: vs. New Orleans Saints ===
- at Veterans Stadium in Philadelphia, Pennsylvania
- Television: CBS
- Announcers: Don Criqui and Johnny Unitas

Ron Jaworski had a great day, running for two touchdowns and passing for two more, as the Eagles won their third game of the season. In the first half, after Jaworski ran for his first touchdown on a 13-play 68-yard drive, he drove the Eagles on a 6-play 35-yard drive that ended with a 11-yard touchdown pass from Jaworski to Harold Carmichael. In the second half, Eagles' safety John Sanders returned an intercepted pass 26 yards to the Eagles' 7-yard line, where 3 plays later Jaworski passed to Carmichael for another score. The Saints finally got on the scoreboard with an 8-play 62-yard drive that ended with a Bobby Douglass 9-yard touchdown pass to Henry Childs. But the Eagles answered to finish off the Saints with a 10-play 57-yard drive that ended with Jaworski's 2-yard touchdown run to cap a great day for the Eagles, with the final score 28–7.
