= 1975 Philadelphia Eagles season =

NFL team season

- Owner: Leonard Tose
- General manager: Jim Murray
- Head coach: Mike McCormack
- Home stadium: Veterans Stadium

Results
- Record: 4–10
- Division place: 5th NFC East
- Playoffs: Did not qualify
- Pro Bowlers: TE Charle Young; QB Mike Boryla

The 1975 Philadelphia Eagles season was the franchise’s 43rd in the National Football League. 1975 was the third season under head coach Mike McCormack, but became the Eagles’ ninth consecutive season without a winning record. The Eagles also missed the playoffs for a fifteenth consecutive season, a franchise record. Following the season, McCormack was fired and replaced for 1976 by Dick Vermeil.

== Offseason ==
=== Player selections ===
The table shows the Eagles selections and what picks they had that were traded away and the team that ended up with that pick. It is possible the Eagles' pick ended up with this team via another team that the Eagles made a trade with. Not shown are acquired picks that the Eagles traded away.

= Pro Bowler (Note: Players are identified as a Pro Bowler if they were selected for the Pro-Bowl at any time in their career.)	= Hall of Famer

Rd	PICK	PLAYER	POS	COLLEGE
1	_{Pick Traded to Los Angeles Rams for QB Roman Gabriel in 1973}			
2	_{Pick Traded to Buffalo Bills for DT Jerry Patton in 1975}			
3	_{Pick Traded to Los Angeles Rams for QB Roman Gabriel in 1973}			
4	_{Pick Traded to New Orleans Saints for LB Dick Absher in 1972}			
5	_{Pick Traded to New England Patriots for RB John Tarver in 1975}			
6	_{Pick Traded to Cincinnati Bengals for QB Mike Boryla in 1974}			
7	167	Bill Capraum	T	Miami (Fla)
8	198	Jeff Bleamer	T	Penn State
9	_{Pick Traded to San Francisco 49ers for RB Randy Jackson in 1974}			
10	248	Ken Schroy	DB	Maryland
11	273	Keith Rowen	G	Stanford
12	298	Dick Pawlewicz	RB	William & Mary
13	324	Tom Ehlers	LB	Kentucky
14	354	Larry O'Rourke	DT	Ohio State
15	379	Clayton Korver	DE	Northwestern College
16	404	Calvin Jones	WR	Texas Tech
17	429	Gary Webb	DE	Temple

== Personnel ==
=== Staff / Coaches ===
1975 Philadelphia Eagles staff
Front office: Owner – Leonard Tose; General manager – Jim Murray; Head coaches: Head coach – Mike McCormack; Offensive coaches: Offensive Passing Game Coordinator - Boyd Dowler; Running Backs – John Idzik; Wide Receivers – Dick Coury; Offensive Line – John Sandusky	Defensive coaches: Defensive Coordinator – Walt Michaels; Defensive Line – Jerry Wampfler; Linebackers - Walt Michaels; Defensive Backs / Secondary – John Mazur; Special teams coaches: Special Teams Assistant – Dick LeBeau

=== Roster ===
1975 Philadelphia Eagles roster
Quarterbacks (QB): 10 Mike Boryla; 5 Roman Gabriel; 12 Bill Troup; Running backs (RB): 38 George Amundson; 33 Po James; 26 Art Malone; 43 James McAlister; 25 Tom Sullivan; Wide receivers (WR): 17 Harold Carmichael; 82 Bob Picard; 85 Charlie Smith; 80 Don Zimmerman; Tight ends (TE): 84 Keith Krepfle; 86 Charle Young	Offensive linemen (OL): 67 Jeff Bleamer G/T; 64 Ernie Janet G; 51 Ron Lou C; 63 Tom Luken G; 50 Guy Morriss C; 74 John Niland G; 76 Jerry Sisemore T; 75 Stan Walters T; Defensive linemen (DL): 61 Bill Dunstan DT; 68 Blenda Gay DE; 69 Rich Glover DT; 65 Rosie Manning DT; 77 Don Ratliff DE; 71 Will Wynn DE	Linebackers (LB): 66 Bill Bergey MLB; 95 John Bunting OLB; 58 Steve Colavito MLB; 59 Tom Ehlers OLB; 56 Dean Halverson OLB; 55 Frank LeMaster OLB; Defensive backs (DB): 28 Bill Bradley FS; 23 Clifford Brooks CB; 30 Joe Lavender CB; 41 Randy Logan SS; 22 Larry Marshall SS; 20 John Outlaw CB; 24 Artimus Parker FS; Special teams (ST): 6 Spike Jones P; 16 Horst Mühlmann K	Reserve: 73 Bill Capraun T (IR); 72 Wade Key G (IR); 62 Bill Lueck G (IR); 54 Jim Opperman LB (IR); Rookies in italics

== Regular season ==
=== Schedule ===
Week	Date	Opponent	Result	Attendance
1	September 21, 1975	**New York Giants**	**L** 23–14	60,798
2	September 28, 1975	at Chicago Bears	**L** 15–13	48,071
3	October 5, 1975	**Washington Redskins**	**W** 26–10	64,397
4	October 12, 1975	at Miami Dolphins	**L** 24–16	60,127
5	October 19, 1975	at **St. Louis Cardinals**	**L** 31–20	45,242
6	October 26, 1975	**Dallas Cowboys**	**L** 20–17	64,889
7	November 3, 1975	Los Angeles Rams	**L** 42–3	64,601
8	November 9, 1975	**St. Louis Cardinals**	**L** 24–23	60,277
9	November 16, 1975	at **New York Giants**	**W** 13–10	53,434
10	November 23, 1975	at **Dallas Cowboys**	**L** 27–17	57,893
11	November 30, 1975	San Francisco 49ers	**W** 27–17	56,694
12	December 7, 1975	Cincinnati Bengals	**L** 31–0	56,984
13	December 14, 1975	at Denver Broncos	**L** 25–10	36,860
14	December 21, 1975	at **Washington Redskins**	**W** 26–3	49,385

Note: Intra-division opponents are in bold text.

=== Game summaries ===
==== Week 1: vs. New York Giants ====
New York Giants at Philadelphia Eagles

Team	1	2	3	4	Total
• Giants	0	13	0	10	23
Eagles	0	7	0	7	14

- Date: September 21
- Location: Veterans Stadium, Philadelphia, Pennsylvania
- Game start: 1:00 p.m. EST
- Game weather: 70 °F (21.1 °C); relative humidity 80%; wind 8 miles per hour (13 km/h; 7.0 kn)
- Television network: CBS

Scoring summary
Q2	Eagles	Charle Young 13 yard pass from Mike Boryla (Horst Muhlmann kick)	Eagles 7–0
Q2	Giants	Ron Johnson 1 yard rush (kick failed)	Eagles 7–6
Q2	Giants	Ron Johnson 3 yard rush (George Hunt kick)	Giants 13–7
Q4	Giants	George Hunt 41 yard field goal	Giants 16–7
Q4	Eagles	Harold Carmichael 2 yard pass from Roman Gabriel (Horst Muhlmann kick)	Giants 16–14
Q4	Giants	Ray Rhodes 50 yard pass from Craig Morton (George Hunt kick)	PHI 26–10

The Eagles lose this game, the first of ten losses during their season.

==== Week 2: at Chicago Bears ====
Philadelphia Eagles (0–2) at Chicago Bears (1–1)

Team	1	2	3	4	Total
**Eagles**	3	3	0	7	13
• Bears	0	9	0	6	15

- Date: September 28
- Location: Soldier Field, Chicago, Illinois
- Game start: 1:00 p.m. CST
- Game weather: 57 °F (13.9 °C), wind 6 miles per hour (9.7 km/h; 5.2 kn)

Scoring summary
Q1	Eagles	Horst Muhlmann 44 yard field goal	Eagles 3–0
Q2	Bears	Bob Thomas 44 yard field goal	3–3
Q2	Bears	Cid Edwards 7 yard pass from Gary Huff (kick failed)	Bears 9–3
Q2	Eagles	Horst Muhlmann 43 yard field goal	Bears 9–6
Q4	Bears	Bob Thomas 24 yard field goal	Bears 12–6
Q4	Eagles	Harold Carmichael 14 yard pass from Roman Gabriel (Horst Muhlmann kick)	Eagles 13–12
Q4	Bears	Bob Thomas 26 yard field goal	Bears 15–13

==== Week 3: vs. Washington Redskins ====
Washington Redskins at Philadelphia Eagles

Team	1	2	3	4	Total
Redskins	3	7	0	0	10
• Eagles	6	3	7	10	26

- Date: October 5
- Location: Veterans Stadium, Philadelphia, Pennsylvania
- Game start: 4:00 p.m. EST
- Game weather: 61 °F (16.1 °C); wind 6 miles per hour (9.7 km/h; 5.2 kn)
- Television network: CBS

Scoring summary
Q1	Redskins	Moseley 45 yard field goal	Redskins 3–0
Q1	Eagles	Carmichael 62 yard pass from Gabriel (kick failed)	Eagles 6–3
Q2	Eagles	Muhlmann 20 yard field goal	Eagles 9–3
Q2	Redskins	Reed 1 yard pass from Kilmer (Moseley kick)	Redskins 10–9
Q3	Eagles	Smith 27 yard pass from Gabriel (Muhlmann kick)	Eagles 16–10
Q4	Eagles	Muhlmann 45 yard field goal	Eagles 19–10
Q4	Eagles	Gabriel 1 yard run (Muhlmann kick)	Eagles 26–10

Eagles’ head coach Mike McCormack had called his team out for “dogging it” prior to the game.

==== Week 4: at Miami Dolphins ====
Philadelphia Eagles (1–3) at Miami Dolphins (3–1)

Team	1	2	3	4	Total
**Eagles**	6	3	0	7	16
• Dolphins	0	10	7	7	24

- Date: October 12
- Location: Orange Bowl, Miami, Florida
- Game start: 1:00 p.m. EST
- Game weather: 80 °F (26.7 °C), wind 13 miles per hour (21 km/h; 11 kn)

Scoring summary
Q1	Eagles	Charlie Smith 22 yard pass from Roman Gabriel (kick failed)	Eagles 6–0
Q2	Dolphins	Don Nottingham 3 yard rush (Garo Yepremian kick)	Dolphins 7–6
Q2	Eagles	Horst Muhlmann 42 yard field goal	Eagles 9–7
Q2	Dolphins	Garo Yepremian 40 yard field goal	Dolphins 10–9
Q3	Dolphins	Nat Moore 13 yard pass from Bob Griese (Garo Yepremian kick)	Dolphins 17–9
Q4	Dolphins	Norm Bulaich 7 yard rush (Garo Yepremian kick)	Dolphins 24–9
Q4	Eagles	James McAlister 39 yard pass from Roman Gabriel (Horst Muhlmann kick)	Dolphins 24–16

==== Week 5: at St. Louis Cardinals ====
Philadelphia Eagles (1–4) at St. Louis Cardinals (3–2)

Team	1	2	3	4	Total
**Eagles**	6	3	0	7	16
• Cardinals	0	10	7	7	24

- Date: October 19
- Location: Busch Stadium, St. Louis, Missouri
- Game start: 2:00 p.m. CST
- Game weather: 46 °F (7.8 °C), wind 10 miles per hour (16 km/h; 8.7 kn)

Scoring summary
Q1	Eagles	Horst Muhlmann 45 yard field goal	Eagles 3–0
Q1	Cardinals	Jim Otis 1 yard rush (Jim Bakken kick)	Cardinals 7–3
Q2	Eagles	Charlie Smith 11 yard pass from Roman Gabriel (Horst Muhlmann kick)	Eagles 10–7
Q2	Cardinals	Jackie Smith 30 yard pass from Jim Hart (Jim Bakken kick)	Cardinals 14–10
Q3	Cardinals	Jim Bakken 24 yard field goal	Cardinals 17–10
Q3	Cardinals	Jim Otis 5 yard rush (Jim Bakken kick)	Cardinals 24–10
Q4	Eagles	Horst Muhlmann 40 yard field goal	Cardinals 24–13
Q4	Eagles	Harold Carmichael 15 yard pass from Roman Gabriel (Horst Muhlmann kick)	Cardinals 24–20
Q4	Cardinals	Eddie Moss 5 yard rush (Jim Bakken kick)	Cardinals 31–20

==== Week 6: vs. Dallas Cowboys ====
Dallas Cowboys (5–1) at Philadelphia Eagles (1–5)

Team	1	2	3	4	Total
• Cowboys	0	10	0	10	20
Eagles	7	7	0	3	17

- Date: October 26
- Location: Veterans Stadium, Philadelphia, Pennsylvania
- Game start: 1:00 p.m. EST
- Game weather: 61 °F (16.1 °C); wind 10 miles per hour (16 km/h; 8.7 kn)
- Television network: CBS

Scoring summary
Q1	Eagles	Harold Carmichael 1 yard pass from Roman Gabriel (Horst Muhlmann kick)	Eagles7–0
Q2	Cowboys	Golden Richards 43 yard punt return (Toni Fritsch kick)	7–7
Q2	Eagles	Harold Carmichael 18 yard pass from Roman Gabriel (Horst Muhlmann kick)	Eagles 14–7
Q2	Cowboys	Toni Fritsch 20 yard field goal	Eagles 14–10
Q4	Eagles	Horst Muhlmann 28 yard field goal	Eagles 17–10
Q4	Cowboys	Drew Pearson 21 yard pass from Roger Staubach (Toni Fritsch kick)	17–17
Q4	Cowboys	Toni Fritsch 42 yard field goal	Cowboys 20–17

==== Week 7: vs. Los Angeles Rams ====
Los Angeles Rams (6–1) at Philadelphia Eagles (1–6)

Team	1	2	3	4	Total
• Rams	7	14	14	7	42
Eagles	0	3	0	0	3

- Date: November 3
- Location: Veterans Stadium, Philadelphia, Pennsylvania
- Game start: 9:00 p.m. EST
- Game weather: 61 °F (16.1 °C); wind 8 miles per hour (13 km/h; 7.0 kn)
- Television network: ABC

Scoring summary
Q1	Rams	John Cappelletti 1 yard rush (Tom Dempsey kick)	Rams 7–0
Q2	Rams	Harold Jackson 54 yard pass from James Harris (Tom Dempsey kick)	Rams 14–0
Q2	Eagles	Horst Muhlmann 36 yard field goal	Rams 14–3
Q2	Rams	Harold Jackson 30 yard pass from James Harris (Tom Dempsey kick)	Rams 21–3
Q3	Rams	Jack Snow 42 yard pass from James Harris (Tom Dempsey kick)	Rams 28–3
Q3	Rams	Fred Dryer 20 yard defensive fumble return (Tom Dempsey kick)	Rams 35–3
Q4	Rams	Isiah Robertson 76 yard interception return (Tom Dempsey kick)	Rams 42–3

==== Week 8: vs. St. Louis Cardinals ====
St. Louis Cardinals (6–2) at Philadelphia Eagles (1–7)

Team	1	2	3	4	Total
• Cardinals	7	0	7	10	24
Eagles	10	10	3	0	23

- Date: November 9
- Location: Veterans Stadium, Philadelphia, Pennsylvania
- Game start: 4:00 p.m. EST
- Game weather: 61 °F (16.1 °C); wind 6 miles per hour (9.7 km/h; 5.2 kn)
- Television network: CBS

Scoring summary
Q1	Eagles	Charle Young 13 yard pass from Roman Gabriel (Horst Muhlmann kick	Eagles 7–0
Q1	Eagles	Horst Muhlmann 37 yard field goal	Eagles 10–0
Q1	Cardinals	Jim Otis 3 yard pass from Jim Hart (Jim Bakken kick)	Eagles 10–7
Q2	Eagles	Po James 47 yard pass from Roman Gabriel (Horst Muhlmann kick)	Eagles 17–7
Q2	Eagles	Horst Muhlmann 27 yard field goal	Eagles 20–7
Q3	Eagles	Horst Muhlmann 25 yard field goal	Eagles 23–7
Q3	Cardinals	Terry Metcalf 1 yard rush (Jim Bakken kick)	Eagles 23–14
Q4	Cardinals	Jim Hart 5 yard rush (Jim Bakken kick)	Eagles 23–21
Q4	Cardinals	Jim Bakken 30 yard field goal	Cardinals 24–23

==== Week 9: at New York Giants ====
Philadelphia Eagles (2–7) at New York Giants (3–6)

Team	1	2	3	4	Total
• **Eagles**	0	7	3	3	13
Giants	3	0	0	7	10

- Date: November 16
- Location: Shea Stadium, Flushing, New York
- Game start: 1:00 p.m. EST
- Game weather: 47 °F (8.3 °C), wind 17 miles per hour (27 km/h; 15 kn)

Scoring summary
1	Giants	George Hunt 34-yard field goal	Giants 3–0
2	Eagles	Charlie Smith 15-yard pass from Roman Gabriel (Horst Muhlmann kick)	Eagles 7–3
3	Eagles	Horst Muhlmann 22-yard field goal	Eagles 10–3
4	Giants	Doug Kotar 3-yard run (George Hunt kick)	Tie 10–10
4	Eagles	Horst Muhlmann 30-yard field goal	Eagles 13–10

==== Week 10: at Dallas Cowboys ====
Philadelphia Eagles (2–8) at Dallas Cowboys (7–3)

Team	1	2	3	4	Total
**Eagles**	0	3	0	14	17
• Cowboys	3	14	3	7	27

- Date: November 23
- Location: Texas Stadium, Irving, Texas
- Game start: 2:00 p.m. CST
- Game weather: 41 °F (5 °C), wind 8 miles per hour (13 km/h; 7.0 kn)

Scoring summary
Q1	Cowboys	Toni Fritsch 26 yard field goal	Cowboys 3–0
Q2	Eagles	Horst Muhlmann 23 yard field goal	3–3
Q2	Cowboys	Preston Pearson 5 yard rush (Toni Fritsch kick)	Cowboys 10–3
Q2	Cowboys	Roger Staubach 1 yard rush (Toni Fritsch kick)	Cowboys 17–3
Q3	Cowboys	Toni Fritsch 20 yard field goal	Cowboys 20–3
Q4	Eagles	James McAlister 13 yard rush (Horst Muhlmann kick)	Cowboys 20–10
Q4	Cowboys	Doug Dennison 5 yard rush (Toni Fritsch kick)	Cowboys 27–10
Q4	Eagles	Po James 1 yard rush (Jim Bakken kick)	Cowboys 27–17

==== Week 11: vs. San Francisco 49ers ====
San Francisco 49ers (5–6) at Philadelphia Eagles (3–8)

Team	1	2	3	4	Total
49ers	0	0	3	14	17
• Eagles	3	10	7	7	27

- Date: November 30
- Location: Veterans Stadium, Philadelphia, Pennsylvania
- Game start: 1:00 p.m. EST
- Game weather: 48 °F (8.9 °C); wind 10 miles per hour (16 km/h; 8.7 kn)
- Television network: CBS

Scoring summary
Q1	Eagles	Horst Muhlmann 51 yard field goal	Eagles 3–0
Q1	Eagles	Horst Muhlmann 42 yard field goal	Eagles 6–0
Q2	Eagles	James McAlister 5 yard pass from Mike Boryla (Horst Muhlmann kick)	Eagles 13–0
Q2	49ers	Steve Mike-Mayer 20 yard field goal	Eagles 13–3
Q3	Eagles	Harold Carmichael 11 yard pass from Mike Boryla (Horst Muhlmann kick)	Eagles 20–3
Q3	49ers	Sammy Johnson 3 yard rush (Steve Mike-Mayer kick)	Eagles 20–10
Q4	Eagles	Charle Young 42 yard pass from Mike Boryla (Horst Muhlmann kick)	Eagles 27–10
Q4	49ers	Gene Washington 17 yard pass from Norm Snead (Steve Mike-Mayer kick	Eagles 27–17

==== Week 12: vs. Cincinnati Bengals ====
Cincinnati Bengals (10–2) at Philadelphia Eagles (3–9)

Team	1	2	3	4	Total
• Bengals	7	17	0	7	31
Eagles	0	0	0	0	0

- Date: December 7
- Location: Veterans Stadium, Philadelphia, Pennsylvania
- Game start: 1:00 p.m. EST
- Game weather: 41 °F (5 °C); wind 14 miles per hour (23 km/h; 12 kn)
- Television network: CBS

Scoring summary
Q1	Bengals	Ed Williams 1 yard rush (Dave Green kick)	Bengals 7–0
Q2	Bengals	Stan Fritts 3 yard rush (Dave Green kick)	Bengals 14–0
Q2	Bengals	Ed Williams 10 yard pass from Ken Anderson (Dave Green kick)	Bengals 21–0
Q2	Bengals	Dave Green 48 yard field goal	Bengals 24–0
Q4	Bengals	John Reaves 3 yard rush (Dave Green kick)	Bengals 31–0

The game was featured in the beginning of the 2006 film Invincible.

==== Week 13: at Denver Broncos ====
Philadelphia Eagles (3–10) at Denver Broncos (6–7)

Team	1	2	3	4	Total
**Eagles**	7	0	3	0	10
• Broncos	3	7	6	9	25

- Date: December 14
- Location: Mile High Stadium, Denver, Colorado
- Game start: 4:00 p.m. MST
- Game weather: 21 °F (−6.1 °C), wind 12 miles per hour (19 km/h; 10 kn), wind chill 9 °F or −12.8 °C

Scoring summary
Q1	Eagles	Charlie Smith 14 yard pass from Mike Boryla (Horst Muhlmann kick)	Eagles 7–0
Q1	Broncos	Jim Turner 47 yard field goal	Eagles 7–3
Q2	Broncos	Fran Lynch 1 yard rush (Jim Turner kick)	Broncos 10–7
Q3	Eagles	Horst Muhlmann 19 yard field goal	10–10
Q3	Broncos	Floyd Little 66 yard pass from Steve Ramsey (kick failed)	Broncos 16–10
Q4	Broncos	Jim Turner 29 yard field goal	Broncos 19–10
Q4	Broncos	Floyd Little 2 yard rush (kick failed)	Broncos 25–10

==== Week 14: at Washington Redskins ====
Philadelphia Eagles (4–10) at Washington Redskins (8–6)

Team	1	2	3	4	Total
• **Eagles**	7	3	10	6	26
Redskins	3	0	0	0	3

- Date: December 21
- Location: Robert F. Kennedy Memorial Stadium, Washington, D.C.
- Game start: 1:00 p.m. EST
- Game weather: 37 °F (2.8 °C), wind 11 miles per hour (18 km/h; 9.6 kn), wind chill 30 °F or −1.1 °C

Scoring summary
Q1	Eagles	Charlie Smith 28 yard pass from Mike Boryla (Horst Muhlmann kick)	Eagles 7–0
Q1	Redskins	Mark Moseley 25 yard field goal	Eagles 7–3
Q2	Eagles	Horst Muhlmann 25 yard field goal	Eagles 10–3
Q3	Eagles	Horst Muhlmann 23 yard field goal	Eagles 13–3
Q3	Eagles	Joe Lavender 36 yard interception return (Horst Muhlmann kick)	Eagles 20–3
Q4	Eagles	Frank LeMaster 89 yard interception return (kick failed)	Eagles 26–3

=== Standings ===
NFC East
	W	L	T	PCT	DIV	CONF	PF	PA	STK
^{(3)} St. Louis Cardinals	11	3	0	.786	6–2	9–2	356	276	W3
^{(4)} Dallas Cowboys	10	4	0	.714	6–2	8–3	350	268	W2
Washington Redskins	8	6	0	.571	4–4	7–4	325	276	L2
New York Giants	5	9	0	.357	1–7	3–8	216	306	W2
Philadelphia Eagles	4	10	0	.286	3–5	4–7	225	302	W1
