= 1976 Philadelphia Eagles season =

NFL team season

- Owner: Leonard Tose
- General manager: Jim Murray
- Head coach: Dick Vermeil
- Home stadium: Veterans Stadium

Results
- Record: 4–10
- Division place: 4th NFC East
- Playoffs: Did not qualify
- Pro Bowlers: LB Bill Bergey

The 1976 Philadelphia Eagles season was the franchise's 44th in the National Football League (NFL). The Eagles were led by first-year head coach Dick Vermeil. The Eagles matched their 4–10 record from the previous season and failed to reach the playoffs for the 16th consecutive season. It was also the 10th straight season for Philadelphia in which they did not end the season with an above .500 record.

== Invincible ==
The season was featured in the 2006 film Invincible. The film was about wide receiver and special teamer Vince Papale, portrayed by Mark Wahlberg, who was signed after receiving an invite to training camp after his success with the fledgling World Football League (WFL) team, the Philadelphia Bell. The film also featured the hiring of Dick Vermeil, portrayed by Greg Kinnear, and his first training camp with the team. The movie also showed multiple preseason games, as well as the Eagles' road game against the Dallas Cowboys and their first victory of the season over the New York Giants. In 1976, the gung-ho new coach of football's hapless Philadelphia Eagles, Dick Vermeil, held open tryouts. Papale's fumble recovery for a touchdown against the Giants did actually happen, however the touchdown was nullified as it was ruled a muffed punt, which can't be advanced. As is typical with movies based on a true story however, several other events depicted in the movie, never happened.

== Offseason ==
After coaching 12th ranked UCLA to a win over the number 1 overall ranked Ohio State in the 1976 Rose Bowl 23–10, Vermeil was offered Eagles head coaching job. Due to trades, he did not get a first-round selection in his first draft.

=== NFL draft ===
The Philadelphia Eagles would pick 9th in the 17 rounds. The Eagles didn't have a selection in rounds 1, 2, 3, and 12 due to trades.

1976 Philadelphia Eagles Draft
Round	Selection	Player	Position	College	Notes
4	111	Mike Smith	DE	Florida	
5	135	Greg Johnson	DT	Florida State	
6	165	Kirk Johnson	T	Howard Payne	
7	191	Carl Hairston	DE	Maryland-Eastern Shore	
8	216	Richard LaFargue	C	Arkansas	
9	247	Mike Hogan	RB	Tennessee-Chattanooga	Pick Acquired from Chicago Bears
9	248	Richard Osborne	TE	Texas A&M	
10	273	Herb Lusk	RB	Long Beach State	
11	300	Mike Gilbert	DT	San Diego State	
13	353	Terry Tautolo	LB	UCLA	Pick Acquired from New York Jets
13	358	Steve Ebbecke	DB	Villanova	
14	385	Melvin Shy	DB	Tennessee State	
15	412	Brett White	Punter	UCLA	
16	439	Steve Campassi	RB	Kentucky	
17	470	Anthony Terry	DB	California-Davis	

== Personnel ==
=== Staff / Coaches ===
1976 Philadelphia Eagles staff
Front office: Owner – Leonard Tose; General manager – Jim Murray; Head coaches: Head coach – Dick Vermeil; Offensive coaches: Offensive Coordinator - John Idzik; Running Backs – Johnny Roland; Wide Receivers – Dick Coury; Tight Ends – Carl Petersen; Offensive Line – Duane Putnam; Offensive Line – Ken Iman	Defensive coaches: Defensive Coordinator – John Mazur; Defensive Line – Chuck Clausen; Linebackers – Rod Rust; Linebackers - Bill Davis, Sr.; Defensive Backs / Secondary – John Mazur; Special teams coaches: Special Teams – Ken Iman

=== Roster ===
1976 Philadelphia Eagles roster
Quarterbacks (QB): 10 Mike Boryla; 18 Roman Gabriel; 11 John Walton; Running backs (RB): 34 Dave Hampton; 35 Mike Hogan; 32 Herb Lusk; 43 James McAlister; 38 Bill Olds; 25 Tom Sullivan; Wide receivers (WR): 17 Harold Carmichael; 83 Vince Papale; 85 Charlie Smith; Tight ends (TE): 84 Keith Krepfle; 86 Charle Young	Offensive linemen (OL): 67 Jeff Bleamer G; 53 Dennis Franks C; 64 Ed George T; 72 Wade Key G; 50 Guy Morriss C; 77 Dennis Nelson T; 76 Jerry Sisemore G; 75 Stan Walters T; Defensive linemen (DL): 61 Bill Dunstan DT; 68 Blenda Gay DE; 78 Carl Hairston DT/DE; 73 Pete Lazetich DE; 79 Manny Sistrunk DT; 71 Will Wynn DE	Linebackers (LB): 66 Bill Bergey MLB; 95 John Bunting OLB; 59 Tom Ehlers OLB; 55 Frank LeMaster OLB; 54 Drew Mahalic OLB; 58 Terry Tautolo MLB; Defensive backs (DB): 28 Bill Bradley FS; 29 Mark Burke SS; 37 Tommy Campbell CB; 21 Al Clark CB; 41 Randy Logan SS; 20 John Outlaw CB; 24 Artimus Parker FS; Special teams (ST): 6 Spike Jones P; 16 Horst Mühlmann K	Reserve: -- Cliff Frazier DT (IR); 56 Dean Halverson LB (IR); 63 Tom Luken G (IR); 26 Art Malone RB (IR); 22 Larry Marshall CB (IR); 74 John Niland G (IR); Rookies in italics

== Regular season ==
=== Schedule ===
A game against the St. Louis Cardinals on October 10 was originally scheduled to be played at Veterans Stadium, but was relocated to St. Louis due to a Philadelphia Phillies game for the MLB National League Championship that ended up being played at Veterans Stadium on the same day. The game on November 7 that was originally scheduled to be played in St. Louis was moved to Philadelphia.

Week	Date	Opponent	Result	Record	Venue	Attendance
1	September 12	at **Dallas Cowboys**	**L** 7–27	0–1	Texas Stadium	54,052
2	September 19	**New York Giants**	**W** 20–7	1–1	Veterans Stadium	66,005
3	September 27	**Washington Redskins**	**L** 17–20 (OT)	1–2	Veterans Stadium	66,005
4	October 3	at Atlanta Falcons	**W** 14–13	2–2	Atlanta–Fulton County Stadium	45,535
5	October 10	at **St. Louis Cardinals**	**L** 14–33	2–3	Busch Memorial Stadium	44,933
6	October 17	at Green Bay Packers	**L** 13–28	2–4	Lambeau Field	55,398
7	October 24	Minnesota Vikings	**L** 12–31	2–5	Veterans Stadium	56,233
8	October 31	at **New York Giants**	**W** 10–0	3–5	Giants Stadium	68,690
9	November 7	**St. Louis Cardinals**	**L** 14–17	3–6	Veterans Stadium	65,505
10	November 14	at Cleveland Browns	**L** 3–24	3–7	Cleveland Municipal Stadium	62,120
11	November 21	Oakland Raiders	**L** 7–26	3–8	Veterans Stadium	65,990
12	November 28	at **Washington Redskins**	**L** 0–24	3–9	Robert F. Kennedy Memorial Stadium	54,292
13	December 5	**Dallas Cowboys**	**L** 7–26	3–10	Veterans Stadium	55,072
14	December 12	Seattle Seahawks	**W** 27–10	4–10	Veterans Stadium	37,949
Note: Intra-division opponents are in **bold** text.

== Standings ==
NFC East
	W	L	T	PCT	DIV	CONF	PF	PA	STK
Dallas Cowboys^{(2)}	11	3	0	.786	6–2	9–3	296	194	L1
Washington Redskins^{(4)}	10	4	0	.714	6–2	9–3	291	217	W4
St. Louis Cardinals	10	4	0	.714	5–3	9–3	309	267	W2
Philadelphia Eagles	4	10	0	.286	2–6	4–8	165	286	W1
New York Giants	3	11	0	.214	1–7	3–9	170	250	L1
