= 1974 Philadelphia Eagles season =

NFL team season

- Owner: Leonard Tose
- General manager: Jim Murray
- Head coach: Mike McCormack

Results
- Record: 7–7
- Division place: 4th NFC East
- Playoffs: Did not qualify
- Pro Bowlers: TE Charle Young; LB Bill Bergey

The 1974 Philadelphia Eagles season was the franchise's 42nd season in the National Football League. The team improved upon their previous season's record of 5–8–1, winning seven games. Despite the improvement, the team failed to qualify for the playoffs for the fourteenth consecutive season.

After having worn white helmets for the previous four seasons, the Eagles switched back to green helmets in 1974. The team has worn green helmets since.

== Offseason ==
=== Draft ===
1974 Philadelphia Eagles draft
Round	Pick	Player	Position	College	Notes
3	63	Mitch Sutton	Defensive end	Kansas	
4	89	Frank LeMaster *	Linebacker	Kentucky	
5	108	Jim Cagle	Defensive tackle	Georgia	
5	115	Keith Krepfle	Tight end	Iowa State	Played for Eagles beginning in 1975
7	167	Willie Cullars	Defensive end	Kansas State	
8	193	Robert Woods	Linebacker	Howard Payne	
9	219	Mark Sheridan	Wide receiver	Holy Cross	
10	245	Phil Polak	Running back	Bowling Green	
11	271	Bill Brittain	Center	Kansas State	
12	297	Artimus Parker	Defensive back	USC	
13	323	Lars Ditlev	Defensive end	South Dakota Tech	
14	349	Dave Smith	Linebacker	Oklahoma	
15	375	Sid Bond	Tackle	TCU	
16	401	Jim Smith	Linebacker	Monmouth	
17	427	Cliff Brown	Running back	Notre Dame	
Made roster * Made at least one Pro Bowl during career

== Personnel ==
=== Staff / Coaches ===
1974 Philadelphia Eagles staff
Front office: Owner – Leonard Tose; General manager – Jim Murray; Head coaches: Head coach – Mike McCormack; Offensive coaches: Offensive Passing Game Coordinator - Boyd Dowler; Running Backs – John Idzik; Wide Receivers – Dick Coury; Offensive Line – John Sandusky	Defensive coaches: Defensive Coordinator – Walt Michaels; Defensive Line – Jerry Wampfler; Linebackers - Walt Michaels; Defensive Backs / Secondary – John Mazur; Special teams coaches: Special Teams Assistant – Dick LeBeau

=== Roster ===
1974 Philadelphia Eagles roster
Quarterbacks (QB): 10 Mike Boryla; 5 Roman Gabriel; 7 John Reaves; Running backs (RB): 36 Norm Bulaich; 33 Randy Jackson; 27 Po James; 48 Greg Oliver; 25 Tom Sullivan; Wide receivers (WR): 17 Harold Carmichael; 21 Wes Chesson; 82 Bob Picard; 85 Charlie Smith; 80 Don Zimmerman; Tight ends (TE): 87 Kent Kramer; 86 Charle Young	Offensive linemen (OL): 67 Herb Dobbins T; 72 Wade Key G; 65 Roy Kirksey G; 63 Tom Luken G; 50 Guy Morriss C; 68 Mark Nordquist G; 76 Jerry Sisemore T; 74 Steve Smith T; 73 Dick Stevens T; Defensive linemen (DL): 78 Jim Cagle DT; 75 Willie Cullars DE; 61 Bill Dunstan DT; 64 Joe Jones DE; 77 Jerry Patton DT; 79 Mitch Sutton DT; 71 Will Wynn DE	Linebackers (LB): 66 Bill Bergey MLB; 95 John Bunting OLB; 56 Dean Halverson OLB; 55 Frank LeMaster OLB; 52 Kevin Reilly MLB; 89 Steve Zabel OLB; Defensive backs (DB): 29 Bill Bradley FS; 32 Charlie Ford CB; 30 Joe Lavender CB; 41 Randy Logan SS; 22 Larry Marshall SS; 20 John Outlaw CB; 24 Artimus Parker FS; 45 Marion Reeves CB; Special teams (ST): 19 Tom Dempsey K; 37 Merritt Kersey P	Reserve: 31 Tom Bailey RB (IR); 8 Al Coleman S (IR); Rookies in italics

== Schedule ==
Week	Date	Opponent	Result	Attendance
1	September 15, 1974	at **St. Louis Cardinals**	**L** 7–3	40,322
2	September 23, 1974	**Dallas Cowboys**	**W** 13–10	64,089
3	September 29, 1974	Baltimore Colts	**W** 30–10	64,205
4	October 6, 1974	at San Diego Chargers	**W** 13–7	36,124
5	October 13, 1974	**New York Giants**	**W** 35–7	64,801
6	October 20, 1974	at **Dallas Cowboys**	**L** 31–24	43,586
7	October 27, 1974	at New Orleans Saints	**L** 14–10	64,257
8	November 3, 1974	at Pittsburgh Steelers	**L** 27–0	47,996
9	November 10, 1974	**Washington Redskins**	**L** 27–20	65,947
10	November 17, 1974	**St. Louis Cardinals**	**L** 13–3	61,982
11	November 24, 1974	at **Washington Redskins**	**L** 26–7	54,395
12	December 1, 1974	Green Bay Packers	**W** 36–14	42,030
13	December 8, 1974	at **New York Giants**	**W** 20–7	21,170
14	December 15, 1974	Detroit Lions	**W** 28–17	57,157

Note: Intra-division opponents are in bold text.

=== Week 13 ===
Philadelphia Eagles (5–7) at New York Giants (2–10)

Quarter	1	2	3	4	Total
Eagles	0	13	7	0	**20**
Giants	0	0	7	0	**7**

at Yale Bowl, New Haven, CT

- Date: December 8
- Game time: 1:00 p.m. EST
- Game weather: Rain; 50 °F (10 °C); wind 13 mph (21 km/h)
- Game attendance: 21,170
- Pro-Football-Reference.com

Game information

Eagles

- Mike Boryla
  23/34, 240 Yds, TD
- Tom Sullivan
  18 Rush, 45 Yds
- Charle Young
  9 Rec, 103 Yds, TD

Giants

- Craig Morton
  18/33, 208 Yds, TD, 2 INT
- Doug Kotar
  4 Rush, 12 Yds
- Walker Gillette
  6 Rec, 100 Yds

Scoring summary

Quarter	Time	Drive			Team	Scoring information	Score	
Quarter	Time	Plays	Yards	TOP	Team	Scoring information	PHI	NYG
2					Eagles	Sullivan 1-yard touchdown run, kick no good	6	0
2					Eagles	Young 7-yard touchdown reception from Boryla, Dempsey kick good	13	0
3					Eagles	Sullivan 1-yard touchdown run, Dempsey kick good	20	0
3					Giants	Dawkins 4-yard touchdown reception from Morton, Gogolak kick good	20	7
"TOP" = time of possession. For other American football terms, see Glossary of American football.							20	7

== Standings ==
NFC East
	W	L	T	PCT	DIV	CONF	PF	PA	STK
St. Louis Cardinals	10	4	0	.714	7–1	8–3	285	218	W1
Washington Redskins	10	4	0	.714	5–3	8–3	320	196	W2
Dallas Cowboys	8	6	0	.571	4–4	6–5	297	235	L1
Philadelphia Eagles	7	7	0	.500	3–5	5–6	242	217	W3
New York Giants	2	12	0	.143	1–7	1–10	195	299	L6
