= 1977 Washington Redskins season =

NFL team season

- Owner: Edward Bennett Williams
- General manager: George Allen
- President: Edward Bennett Williams
- Head coach: George Allen
- Offensive coordinator: Charlie Waller
- Defensive coordinator: LaVern Torgeson
- Home stadium: RFK Stadium

Results
- Record: 9–5
- Division place: 2nd NFC East
- Playoffs: Did not qualify

The 1977 Washington Redskins season was the franchise's 46th season overall, and would be the last under Hall of Fame head coach George Allen. The season began with the team trying to improve on their 10–4 record from 1976, but they would finish 9–5 and fail to qualify for postseason play.

Additionally; this would also mark the last season for several longtime Redskins stars in future Hall-of-Fame wide receiver Charley Taylor, tight end Jerry Smith, center Len Hauss, defensive tackle Bill Brundige and safety Brig Owens; all of whom retired after the season.

== Offseason ==
=== NFL draft ===
1977 Washington Redskins draft
| Round | Selection | Player | Position | College |
|---|---|---|---|---|
| 4 | 97 | Duncan McColl | Defensive end | Stanford |
| 7 | 190 | Reggie Haynes | Tight end | UNLV |
| 9 | 246 | Mike Northington | Running back | Purdue |
| 10 | 273 | James Sykes | Running back | Rice |
| 11 | 300 | Don Harris | Defensive back | Rutgers |
| 12 | 327 | Curtis Kirkland | Defensive end | Missouri |

== Personnel ==
=== Staff / Coaches ===
1977 Washington Redskins staff
| Front office: Majority Owner / Vice President – Edward Bennett Williams; Minority Owner / President – Jack Kent Cooke; General manager – George Allen; Executive assistant to the General Manager – C.A. Temerario; Assistant Public Relations Director – Charles M. Taylor; Assistant general manager / Admin Assistant / Administrative Assistant – Dick Meyers; Director of player personnel – C.A. Temerario; Director of College Scouting - Mike Allman; Director of Pro Scouting - Bobby Mitchell; Personnel Scout - Mike Faulkner; Business Manager – Joel Margolis; Head coaches: Head Coach – George Allen; Offensive coaches: Offensive Coordinator – Charlie Waller; Running Backs – Joe Walton; Tight Ends / Wide Receivers – Pete McCulley; Offensive Line – Bill Austin | Defensive coaches: Defensive Coordinator – LaVern Torgeson; Linebackers – George Dickson; Defensive Secondary – Ralph Hawkins; Special teams coaches: Special Teams Coach – Paul Lanham |

=== Final roster ===
1977 Washington Redskins roster
| Quarterbacks (QB): 17 Billy Kilmer; 7 Joe Theismann; Running backs (RB): 26 Bob Brunet RB; 30 Jim Kiick RB; 38 Clarence Harmon FB; 35 Calvin Hill HB; 44 John Riggins FB; 22 Mike Thomas HB; Wide receivers (WR): 42 Charley Taylor; 21 Larry Jones RB/WR; 88 Danny Buggs; 46 Frank Grant RB/WR; Tight ends (TE): 84 Jean Fugett; 86 Bill Larson; 89 Reggie Haynes | Offensive linemen (OL): 76 Tim Stokes LT; 64 Ron Saul LG; 62 Dan Nugent G; 54 Bob Kuziel C; 75 Terry Hermeling T; 54 Bob Kuziel C; 56 Len Hauss C; 75 Terry Hermeling RG; 74 George Starke RT; Defensive linemen (DL): 79 Ron McDole DE; 70 Will Wynn DE; 71 Karl Lorch DE; 82 Dallas Hickman DE; 65 Dave Butz DT; 72 Diron Talbert; 61 Dennis Johnson | Linebackers (LB): 59 Brad Dusek OLB; 53 Harold McLinton MLB; 32 Mike Curtis LB; 50 Pete Wysocki OLB; 67 Rusty Tillman LB; 57 Stu O'Dell LB; 51 Joe Harris LB; 55 Chris Hanburger OLB; Defensive backs (DB): 20 Joe Lavender; 27 Ken Houston SS; 13 Jake Scott FS; 23 Brig Owens DB; 29 Mark Murphy FS; 40 Windlan Hall DB; 37 Pat Fischer DB; 25 Eddie Brown DB; Special teams (ST): 4 Mike Bragg P; 3 Mark Moseley K; 66 Ted Fritsch LS /OL | Reserve: 77 Bill Brundige DT (IR); 36 Eddie Moss RB (IR); Rookies in italics 50 active, 2 reserve, 0 practice squad |

== Regular season ==
=== Schedule ===
| Week | Date | Opponent | Result | Record | Venue | Attendance | Recap |
|---|---|---|---|---|---|---|---|
| 1 | September 18 | at **New York Giants** | **L** 17–20 | 0–1 | Giants Stadium | 76,086 | Recap |
| 2 | September 25 | Atlanta Falcons | **W** 10–6 | 1–1 | RFK Stadium | 55,031 | Recap |
| 3 | October 2 | **St. Louis Cardinals** | **W** 24–14 | 2–1 | RFK Stadium | 55,031 | Recap |
| 4 | October 9 | at Tampa Bay Buccaneers | **W** 10–0 | 3–1 | Tampa Stadium | 58,571 | Recap |
| 5 | October 16 | at **Dallas Cowboys** | **L** 16–34 | 3–2 | Texas Stadium | 62,115 | Recap |
| 6 | October 23 | **New York Giants** | **L** 6–17 | 3–3 | RFK Stadium | 53,903 | Recap |
| 7 | October 30 | **Philadelphia Eagles** | **W** 23–17 | 4–3 | RFK Stadium | 55,031 | Recap |
| 8 | November 7 | at Baltimore Colts | **L** 3–10 | 4–4 | Memorial Stadium | 57,740 | Recap |
| 9 | November 13 | at **Philadelphia Eagles** | **W** 17–14 | 5–4 | Veterans Stadium | 60,702 | Recap |
| 10 | November 21 | Green Bay Packers | **W** 10–9 | 6–4 | RFK Stadium | 51,498 | Recap |
| 11 | November 27 | **Dallas Cowboys** | **L** 7–14 | 6–5 | RFK Stadium | 55,031 | Recap |
| 12 | December 4 | at Buffalo Bills | **W** 10–0 | 7–5 | Rich Stadium | 22,975 | Recap |
| 13 | December 10 | at **St. Louis Cardinals** | **W** 26–20 | 8–5 | Busch Memorial Stadium | 36,067 | Recap |
| 14 | December 17 | Los Angeles Rams | **W** 17–14 | 9–5 | RFK Stadium | 54,208 | Recap |
Note: Intra-division opponents are in **bold** text.

=== Game summaries ===
==== Week 2 ====
- TV Network: CBS
- Announcers: Vin Scully, Sonny Jurgensen

In front of a sell out crowd, Billy Kilmer lobbed a two-yard scoring pass to Mike Thomas in the third period and Atlanta failed to capitalize on several opportunities for touchdowns as Washington beats Atlanta. Despite the touchdown pass, Kilmer threw two interceptions and fumbling in Atlanta's territory.

==== Week 4 ====
The Tampa Bay Buccaneers tried to win their first game as their defense held the Redskins to just 10 points and only 118 passing yards allowed but still they lost to the Redskins. All the Redskins 10 points were scored in the first period. Kicker Mark Moseley kicked a 44-yard field goal and Mike Thomas 6-yard td run were the only scores of the game for both teams. The Redskins limited the Bucs offense to minus 1 yard in the first half and never look back. Redskins Bill Brundige said it best about the Bucs when he said "I leave Tampa admiring their defense. It's a winner but the offense... coach John McKay is going to have to learn that the I-formation isn't going to work. He isn't at USC anymore playing Stanford."

==== Week 7 ====
- TV Network: CBS
- Announcers: Don Criqui and Sonny Jurgensen

Joe Theismann started at quarterback for Washington and early on he was on his game as he threw two early touchdown passes and Mark Moseley kicked three field goals, Theismann replaced 38-yard-old Billy Kilmer, hit tight end Jean Fugett with a pair of 15-yard touchdown passes on Washington's first two possessions while Moseley kicked field goals of 46 and 30 yards. Moseley added a third one from 51 yards in the third quarter. The Eagles ran out of time in a bid to win, getting as close to the Redskins' 20-yard line before turning the ball over on downs with 41 seconds to play. The Eagles though gave it a battle as Ron Jaworski tossed a 48-yard touchdown pass to Harold Carmichael, a 16-run touchdown by James Betterson and a 44-yard field goal made this a good game involving these two teams.

==== Week 9 ====
- TV Network: CBS
- Announcers: Don Criqui and Sonny Jurgensen

In a rematch from two weeks ago, the Eagles opened up scoring with a 21-yard touchdown pass from Ron Jaworski to Tom Sullivan in the only score of the first half. The Redskins tied the score in the third period on a 6-play 65-yard drive and ended with a 14-yard touchdown pass from Joe Theismann to Frank Grant. The Eagles untied it in the fourth period as Jaworski scored from one yard. The Redskins then came back first Dallas Hickman blocked an Eagles punt and advanced it to the Philadelphia 19. A 10-yard unsportsmanlike conduct foul moved the Skins to the 9 where Theismann and Calvin Hill each ran for 2 yards then Theismann hit Danny Buggs for 5 yards to tie the game. Later the Redskins' Mark Moseley kicked a 54-yard field goal to put the Skins ahead by 3, but back came the Eagles where they drove from their own 14 to the Washington 14 where after 3 incomplete passes. Horst Muhlmann came on and with 18 seconds to play miss an easy 31-yard field goal to seal a Redskins win.

Week 12

TV Network: CBS

Announcers: Don Criqui and Nick Buoniconti

Joe Theismann starts for the Redskins on a cold, windy afternoon in Buffalo in a 75% empty Rich Stadium. Early in the 2nd quarter, Theismann scrambled to his right and hit TE Jean Fugett at the Bills' 6-yard line, who then dove across the goal at the pylon from the two to score the only touchdown of the game for either team. Buffalo's Carson Long missed a field goal attempt with :03 in the first half when the Redskins' Bill Brundidge got a hand on the kicked ball. Buffalo drove inside the Washington 30 in the 4th quarter when Joe Ferguson hit Jim Braxton down the seam, but Braxton fumbled at the 10-yard line to kill the drive. Mark Moseley would go on to kick a field goal to push the final score to 10–0, Redskins.

Week 13

- TV Network: CBS
- Announcers: Pat Summerall, Tom Brookshier

It was a key game for both teams. Washington's Billy Kilmer tossed a 14-yard touchdown pass to Calvin Hill and later a 40-yard field goal by Mark Moseley. But back came the Cardinals, as they got a 32-yard field goal by Jim Bakken and later a 1-yard touchdown run by Steve Jones. Moseley then kicked a 23-yard field goal with 34 seconds left to give the Redskins a 13–10 halftime lead. Then Brad Dusek intercepted a Hart pass in the second half at the Cardinals' 47 to set up Moseley's 42-yard field goal and the Redskins lead. Moseley also kicked a 37-yard field goal. The Redskins then added another touchdown as Mike Thomas scored from the 4 to give the Redskins a 26–13 lead. The Cardinals' quarterback Jim Hart hit Terry Metcalf for a 68-yard touchdown strike. Late in the game, the Cardinals rallied to try to take the lead. Their first attempt ended on downs and then in their final fateful drive it ended with an interception by Eddie Brown to seal the Redskins win and with that loss The Cardinals were out of the playoff picture.

==== Week 14 ====
| Team | 1 | 2 | 3 | 4 | Total |
|---|---|---|---|---|---|
| Rams | 0 | 0 | 0 | 14 | 14 |
| • Redskins | 14 | 0 | 3 | 0 | 17 |

- Date: December 17
- Location: RFK Stadium, Washington, D.C.
- Game start: 1:00 p.m.
- Game weather: 41 °F (5 °C); wind 6 mph (9.7 km/h)
- TV announcers (CBS): Pat Summerall, Tom Brookshier

Scoring summary
| Q1 | WSH | Frank Grant 59 yard pass from Kilmer (Moseley kick) | WSH 7–0 |
| Q1 | WSH | Fugett 3 yard pass from Kilmer (Moseley kick) | WSH 14–0 |
| Q3 | WSH | Moseley 45 yard field goal | WSH 17–0 |
| Q4 | LA | Nelson 17 yard pass from Ferragamo (Septien kick) | WSH 17–7 |
| Q4 | LA | Jodat 2 yard pass from Ferragamo (Septien kick) | WSH 17–14 |

=== Standings ===
NFC East
| | W | L | T | PCT | DIV | CONF | PF | PA | STK |
|---|---|---|---|---|---|---|---|---|---|
| ^{(1)} Dallas Cowboys | 12 | 2 | 0 | .857 | 7–1 | 11–1 | 345 | 212 | W4 |
| Washington Redskins | 9 | 5 | 0 | .643 | 4–4 | 8–4 | 196 | 189 | W3 |
| St. Louis Cardinals | 7 | 7 | 0 | .500 | 4–4 | 7–5 | 272 | 287 | L4 |
| Philadelphia Eagles | 5 | 9 | 0 | .357 | 2–6 | 4–8 | 220 | 207 | W2 |
| New York Giants | 5 | 9 | 0 | .357 | 3–5 | 5–7 | 181 | 265 | L2 |
