= 1979 Philadelphia Eagles season =

NFL team season

- Owner: Leonard Tose
- General manager: Jim Murray
- Head coach: Dick Vermeil
- Home stadium: Veterans Stadium

Results
- Record: 11–5
- Division place: 2nd NFC East
- Playoffs: Won Wild Card Playoffs (vs. Bears) 27–17; Lost Divisional Playoffs (at Buccaneers) 17–24

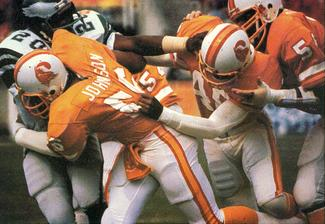
The Eagles playing against the Buccaneers in the 1979 NFC Divisional Playoff Game.

The 1979 Philadelphia Eagles season was the franchise's 47th season in the National Football League (NFL).

They appeared in the postseason for the second consecutive year, an attainment that the team had not achieved for three decades. They would make the playoffs again in the following two seasons before a six-year drought. The Eagles managed to host and win their first playoff game since 1960. They would ultimately fall in the divisional round to the Tampa Bay Buccaneers by a score of 24–17.

== Offseason ==
After going 9–7 in the 1978 season and making the playoffs, the Eagles found themselves having to follow rule 3 of the draft – "Teams that made the playoffs are then ordered by which round of the playoffs they are eliminated" – meaning four teams with a record the same or better than the Eagles would pick in front of them.

=== NFL draft ===
The 1979 NFL draft was the procedure by which National Football League teams selected amateur college football players. It is officially known as the NFL Annual Player Selection Meeting. The draft was held May 3–4, 1979 in New York City. As was started with the 1977 NFL draft, this was 12 rounds.

The Philadelphia Eagles got the 19th to the 21st picks in the 12 rounds. They had overcome the traded-away draft picks of the Mike McCormack era. The Eagles had waited but they finally had a first-round pick and other low-round draft picks. They would use these and build a team as 7 of the 10 draft picks made the team for the coming years.

The draft began with first overall pick of Tom Cousineau, linebacker from Ohio State, by the Buffalo Bills. With the number 7 pick the New York Giants selected Phil Simms, a quarterback from Morehead State. The crowd, made up of mostly New York fans, voiced their displeasure of his selection.

=== Player selections ===
The table shows the Eagles selections and what picks they had that were traded away and the team that ended up with that pick. It is possible the Eagles' pick ended up with this team via another trade the Eagles made. Not shown are acquired picks that the Eagles traded away.

= Pro Bowler	= Hall of Famer

Round	Pick	Player	Position	School
1	21	Jerry Robinson	LB	UCLA
2	48	Petey Perot	G	Northwestern State University
3	74	Tony Franklin	Kicker	Texas A & M
4	94	Ben Cowins	RB	Arkansas
5	126	Scott Fitzkee	TE	Penn State
6	158	Pick Traded to New York Giants		
7	178	Don Swafford	OT	Florida
7	185	Curtis Bunche	DT	Albany State
8	196	Chuck Correal	C	Penn State
8	211	Max Runager	Punter	South Carolina
9		Pick Traded to		
10		Pick Traded to		
11	296	Al Chesley	LB	Pittsburgh
12		Pick Traded to		

== Personnel ==
=== Staff / Coaches ===
1979 Philadelphia Eagles staff
Front office: Owner – Leonard Tose; General manager – Jim Murray; Head coaches: Head coach – Dick Vermeil; Offensive coaches: Quarterbacks / Quality Control – Sid Gillman; Running Backs – Billy Joe; Receivers – Dick Coury; Tight Ends – Lynn Stiles; Offensive Line – Ken Iman; Offensive Line – Jerry Wampfler	Defensive coaches: Defensive Coordinator – Marion Campbell; Defensive Line – Chuck Clausen; Linebackers – George Hill; Defensive Backs / Secondary – Fred Bruney; Special teams coaches: Special Teams – Lynn Stiles, Ken Iman

=== Roster ===
1979 Philadelphia Eagles roster
Quarterbacks (QB): 7 Ron Jaworski; 10 John Walton; Running backs (RB): 38 Larry Barnes; 37 Billy Campfield; 33 Louie Giammona; 20 Leroy Harris; 31 Wilbert Montgomery; Wide receivers (WR): 17 Harold Carmichael; 81 Scott Fitzkee; 89 Wally Henry; 82 Jerrold McRae; 85 Charlie Smith; Tight ends (TE): 84 Keith Krepfle; 88 John Spagnola	Offensive linemen (OL): 72 Wade Key G; 79 Rufus Mayes T; 50 Guy Morriss C; 69 Woody Peoples G; 62 Petey Perot G; 76 Jerry Sisemore T; 61 Mark Slater C; 75 Stan Walters T; Defensive linemen (DL): 67 Lem Burnham DE; 71 Ken Clarke NT; 78 Carl Hairston DE; 68 Dennis Harrison DE; 87 Claude Humphrey DE; 65 Charlie Johnson NT; 79 Manny Sistrunk DE	Linebackers (LB): 95 John Bunting OLB; 59 Al Chesley ILB; 55 Frank LeMaster ILB; 52 Ray Phillips OLB; 56 Jerry Robinson ILB; 58 Terry Tautolo ILB; 51 Reggie Wilkes OLB; Defensive backs (DB): 27 Richard Blackmore CB; 46 Herm Edwards CB; 23 Bob Howard CB; 41 Randy Logan SS; 24 Henry Monroe CB; 26 Deac Sanders FS; 21 John Sciarra FS; Special teams (ST): 1 Tony Franklin K; 4 Max Runager P	Reserve: 66 Bill Bergey LB (IR); 96 Curtis Bunche DE (IR); 73 Steve Kenney T (IR); 29 Al Latimer CB (IR); 97 Mike Siegel TE (IR); 22 Brenard Wilson S (IR); Rookies in italics

== Regular season ==
=== Schedule ===
Week	Date	Opponent	Result	Record	Attendance
1	September 2, 1979	**New York Giants**	**W** 23–17	1–0	67,366
2	September 10, 1979	Atlanta Falcons	**L** 14–10	1–1	66,935
3	September 16, 1979	at New Orleans Saints	**W** 26–14	2–1	54,212
4	September 23, 1979	at **New York Giants**	**W** 17–13	3–1	74,265
5	September 30, 1979	Pittsburgh Steelers	**W** 17–14	4–1	70,352
6	October 7, 1979	**Washington Redskins**	**W** 28–17	5–1	69,142
7	October 14, 1979	at **St. Louis Cardinals**	**W** 24–20	6–1	48,367
8	October 21, 1979	at **Washington Redskins**	**L** 17–7	6–2	54,442
9	October 28, 1979	at Cincinnati Bengals	**L** 37–13	6–3	42,036
10	November 4, 1979	Cleveland Browns	**L** 24–19	6–4	69,019
11	November 12, 1979	at **Dallas Cowboys**	**W** 31–21	7–4	62,417
12	November 18, 1979	**St. Louis Cardinals**	**W** 16–13	8–4	70,235
13	November 25, 1979	at Green Bay Packers	**W** 21–10	9–4	50,023
14	December 2, 1979	Detroit Lions	**W** 44–7	10–4	66,128
15	December 8, 1979	**Dallas Cowboys**	**L** 24–17	10–5	71,434
16	December 16, 1979	at Houston Oilers	**W** 26–20	11–5	49,407

Note: Intra-division opponents are in bold text.

== Game summaries ==
=== Week 5 ===
Week 5: Pittsburgh Steelers at Philadelphia Eagles

Quarter	1	2	3	4	Total
Steelers	0	7	0	7	14
Eagles	0	7	10	0	17

at Veterans Stadium • Philadelphia, Pennsylvania

- Date: September 30, 1979
- Game time: 1:00 p.m.
- Game attendance: 70,352
- Referee: Cal Lepore
- TV announcers (NBC): Charlie Jones and Len Dawson
- Pro-Football-Reference.com

Game information

Steelers

- Terry Bradshaw
  12/26, 176 Yds, TD, 2 INT
- Sidney Thornton
  16 Rush, 88 Yds, TD
- John Stallworth
  5 Rec, 102 Yds, TD

Eagles

- Ron Jaworski
  11/20, 158 Yds, 2 INT
- Wilbert Montgomery
  28 Rush, 98 Yds, TD
- Keith Krepfle
  4 Rec, 95 Yds

Scoring summary

Quarter	Time	Drive			Team	Scoring information	Score	
Quarter	Time	Plays	Yards	TOP	Team	Scoring information	PIT	PHI
2					Steelers	Thornton 7-yard touchdown run, Bahr kick good	7	0
2					Eagles	Harris 1-yard touchdown run, Franklin kick good	7	7
3					Eagles	48-yard field goal by Franklin	7	10
3					Eagles	Montgomery 1-yard touchdown run, Franklin kick good	7	17
4					Steelers	Stallworth 37-yard touchdown reception from Bradshaw, Bahr kick good	14	17
"TOP" = time of possession. For other American football terms, see Glossary of American football.							14	17

=== Week 6 ===
Week 6: Washington Redskins at Philadelphia Eagles

Quarter	1	2	3	4	Total
Redskins	0	7	0	10	17
Eagles	7	7	14	0	28

at Veterans Stadium • Philadelphia, Pennsylvania

- Date: October 7, 1979
- Game time: 1:00 p.m.
- Game attendance: 69,142
- TV announcers (CBS): Gary Bender and Sonny Jurgensen
- Pro-Football-Reference.com

Game information

Redskins

- Joe Theismann
  19/32, 165 Yds, TD, INT
- John Riggins
  23 Rush, 115 Yds, TD
- Johnnie McDaniel
  4 Rec, 35 Tds

Eagles

- Ron Jaworski
  8/12, 143 Yds, TD
- Wilbert Montgomery
  22 Rush, 127 Yds, 3 TD
- Keith Krepfle
  3 Rec, 79 Yds

Scoring summary

Quarter	Time	Drive			Team	Scoring information	Score	
Quarter	Time	Plays	Yards	TOP	Team	Scoring information	WSH	PHI
1					Eagles	Montgomery 8-yard touchdown run, Franklin kick good	0	7
2					Eagles	Montgomery 11-yard touchdown reception from Jaworski, Franklin kick good	0	14
3					Eagles	Montgomery 5-yard touchdown run, Franklin kick good	7	21
3					Eagles	Montgomery 4-yard touchdown run, Franklin kick good	7	28
4					Redskins	37-yard field goal by Moseley	10	28
4					Redskins	Riggins 1-yard touchdown run, Moseley kick good	17	28
"TOP" = time of possession. For other American football terms, see Glossary of American football.							17	28

=== Week 8 ===
Week 8: Philadelphia Eagles at Washington Redskins

Quarter	1	2	3	4	Total
Eagles	0	0	0	7	7
Redskins	0	7	7	3	17

at RFK Stadium • Washington, D.C.

- Date: October 21, 1979
- Game time: 1:00 p.m.
- Game attendance: 54,442
- TV announcers (CBS): Vin Scully and George Allen
- Pro-Football-Reference.com

Game information

Eagles

- Ron Jaworski
  12/27, 192 Yds, TD, 2 INT
- Wilbert Montgomery
  11 Rush, 33 Yds
- Keith Krepfle
  4 Rec, 81 Yds

Redskins

- Joe Theismann
  15/24, 136 Yds, 2 INT
- John Riggins
  19 Rush, 120 Yds
- Clarence Harmon
  3 Rec, 33 Yds

Scoring summary

Quarter	Time	Drive			Team	Scoring information	Score	
Quarter	Time	Plays	Yards	TOP	Team	Scoring information	PHI	WSH
2					Redskins	Malone 10-yard touchdown run, Moseley kick good	0	7
3					Redskins	Theismann 1-yard touchdown run, Moseley kick good	0	14
4					Redskins	23-yard field goal by Moseley	0	17
4					Eagles	Krepfle 40-yard touchdown reception from Jaworski, Franklin kick good	7	17
"TOP" = time of possession. For other American football terms, see Glossary of American football.							7	17

=== Week 11 ===
Week 11: Philadelphia Eagles at Dallas Cowboys

Quarter	1	2	3	4	Total
Eagles	7	10	7	7	31
Cowboys	7	0	0	14	21

at Texas Stadium • Irving, Texas

- Date: November 12, 1979
- Game time: 9:00 p.m.
- Game attendance: 62,417
- Referee: Gene Barth
- TV announcers (ABC): Frank Gifford, Howard Cosell and Don Meredith
- Pro-Football-Reference.com

Game information

Eagles

- Ron Jaworski
  12/29, 145 Yds, 2 TD
- Wilbert Montgomery
  25 Rush, 127 Yds, TD
- Harold Carmichael
  4 Rec, 69 Yds

Cowboys

- Roger Staubach
  17/28, 308 Yds, 3 TD
- Tony Dorsett
  13 Rush, 53 Yds
- Tony Hill
  7 Rec, 213 Yds, 2 TD

Scoring summary

Quarter	Time	Drive			Team	Scoring information	Score	
Quarter	Time	Plays	Yards	TOP	Team	Scoring information	PHI	DAL
1					Cowboys	Hill 48-yard touchdown reception from Staubach, Septien kick good	0	7
1					Eagles	Carmichael 32-yard touchdown reception from Jaworski, Franklin kick good	7	7
2					Eagles	Smith 29-yard touchdown reception from Walton, Franklin kick good	14	7
2					Eagles	59-yard field goal by Franklin	17	7
3					Eagles	Carmichael 13-yard touchdown reception from Jaworski, Franklin kick good	24	7
4					Cowboys	Hill 75-yard touchdown reception from Staubach, Septien kick good	24	14
4					Cowboys	DuPree 5-yard touchdown reception from Staubach, Septien kick good	24	21
4					Eagles	Montgomery 37-yard touchdown run, Franklin kick good	31	21
"TOP" = time of possession. For other American football terms, see Glossary of American football.							31	21

=== Week 15 ===
Week 15: Dallas Cowboys at Philadelphia Eagles

Quarter	1	2	3	4	Total
Cowboys	10	0	7	7	24
Eagles	3	7	0	7	17

at Veterans Stadium • Philadelphia, Pennsylvania

- Date: December 8, 1979
- Game time: 12:30 p.m.
- Game attendance: 71,434
- Referee: Jim Tunney
- TV announcers (CBS): Pat Summerall, Tom Brookshier, Frank Glieber and Irv Cross
- Pro-Football-Reference.com

Game information

Cowboys

- Roger Staubach
  11/21, 105 Yds, TD
- Robert Newhouse
  12 Rush, 68 Yds, TD
- Tony Hill
  3 Rec, 33 Yds

Eagles

- Ron Jaworski
  13/36, 216 Yds, TD, INT
- Wilbert Montgomery
  23 Rush, 65 Yds, TD
- Wilbert Montgomery
  4 Rec, 93 Yds, TD

Scoring summary

Quarter	Time	Drive			Team	Scoring information	Score	
Quarter	Time	Plays	Yards	TOP	Team	Scoring information	DAL	PHI
1					Cowboys	Laidlaw 1-yard touchdown run, Septien kick good	7	0
1					Eagles	27-yard field goal by Franklin	7	3
1					Cowboys	40-yard field goal by Septien	10	3
2					Eagles	Montgomery 14-yard touchdown reception from Jaworski, Franklin kick good	10	10
3					Cowboys	Newhouse 17-yard touchdown run, Septien kick good	17	10
4					Cowboys	Johnson 17-yard touchdown reception from Staubach, Septien kick good	24	10
4					Eagles	Montgomery 1-yard touchdown run, Franklin kick good	24	17
"TOP" = time of possession. For other American football terms, see Glossary of American football.							24	17

=== Week 16 ===
Week 16: Philadelphia Eagles at Houston Oilers

Quarter	1	2	3	4	Total
Eagles	9	3	7	7	26
Oilers	0	10	0	10	20

at Astrodome • Houston, Texas

- Date: December 16, 1979
- Game time: 4:00 p.m.
- Game attendance: 49,407
- TV announcers (CBS): Gary Bender and Sonny Jurgensen
- Pro-Football-Reference.com

Game information

Eagles

- Ron Jaworski
  12/21, 163 Yds
- Billy Campfield
  7 Rush, 68 Yds
- Wilbert Montgomery
  5 Rec, 51 Yds

Oilers

- Dan Pastorini
  7/14, 85 Yds, TD, 2 INT
- Earl Campbell
  16 Rush, 134 Yds, TD
- Mike Renfro
  3 Rec, 67 Yds, TD

Scoring summary

Quarter	Time	Drive			Team	Scoring information	Score	
Quarter	Time	Plays	Yards	TOP	Team	Scoring information	PHI	HOU
1					Eagles	Jaworski 4-yard touchdown run, Franklin kick no good	6	0
1					Eagles	22-yard field goal by Franklin	9	0
2					Oilers	Campbell 6-yard touchdown run, Fritsch kick good	9	7
2					Eagles	41-yard field goal by Franklin	12	7
2					Oilers	44-yard field goal by Fritsch	12	10
3					Eagles	Harris 1-yard touchdown run, Franklin kick good	19	10
4					Oilers	Renfro 7-yard touchdown reception from Pastorini, Fritsch kick good	19	17
4					Eagles	Fitzkee 4-yard touchdown reception from Walton, Franklin kick good	26	17
4					Oilers	37-yard field goal by Fritsch	26	20
"TOP" = time of possession. For other American football terms, see Glossary of American football.							26	20

== Standings ==
NFC East
	W	L	T	PCT	DIV	CONF	PF	PA	STK
Dallas Cowboys^{(1)}	11	5	0	.688	6–2	10–2	371	313	W3
Philadelphia Eagles^{(4)}	11	5	0	.688	6–2	9–3	339	282	W1
Washington Redskins	10	6	0	.625	5–3	8–4	348	295	L1
New York Giants	6	10	0	.375	1–7	5–9	237	323	L3
St. Louis Cardinals	5	11	0	.313	2–6	4–8	307	358	L1

== Postseason ==
=== Schedule ===
Round	Date	Opponent (seed)	Result	Record	Venue	Recap
Wild Card	December 23, 1979	Chicago Bears (5)	W 27–17	1–0	Veterans Stadium	Recap
Divisional	December 29, 1979	at Tampa Bay Buccaneers (2)	L 17–24	1–1	Tampa Stadium	Recap

=== Game summaries ===
==== NFC Wild Card Playoffs: vs. (5) Chicago Bears ====
NFC Wild Card Playoffs: (5) Chicago Bears at (4) Philadelphia Eagles – Game summary

Quarter	1	2	3	4	Total
Bears	7	10	0	0	17
Eagles	7	3	7	10	27

at Veterans Stadium, Philadelphia

- Date: December 23, 1979
- Game time: 12:30 p.m. EST
- Game attendance: 69,397
- Referee: Red Cashion
- TV announcers (CBS): Vin Scully and George Allen

Game information

First quarter

- PHI – Harold Carmichael 17-yard pass from Ron Jaworski (Tony Franklin kick). Eagles 7–0.
- CHI – Walter Payton 2-yard run (Bob Thomas kick). Tied 7–7.

Second quarter

- PHI – Tony Franklin 29-yard field goal. Eagles 10–7.
- CHI – Walter Payton 1-yard run (Bob Thomas kick). Bears 14–10.
- CHI – Bob Thomas 30-yard field goal. Bears 17–10.

Third quarter

- PHI – Harold Carmichael 29-yard pass from Ron Jaworski (Tony Franklin kick). Tied 17–17.

Fourth quarter

- PHI – Billy Campfield 63-yard pass from Ron Jaworski (Tony Franklin kick). Eagles 24–17.
- PHI – Tony Franklin 34-yard field goal. Eagles 27–17.

Top passers

- CHI – Mike Phipps – 13/30, 142 yards, 2 INT
- PHI – Ron Jaworski – 12/23, 204 yards, 3 TD, INT

Top rushers

- CHI – Walter Payton – 16 rushes, 67 yards, 2 TD
- PHI – Wilbert Montgomery – 26 rushes, 87 yards

Top receivers

- CHI – Walter Payton – 3 receptions, 52 yards
- PHI – Harold Carmichael – 6 receptions, 111 yards, 2 TD

==== NFC Divisional Playoffs: at (2) Tampa Bay Buccaneers ====
NFC Divisional Playoffs: (4) Philadelphia Eagles at (2) Tampa Bay Buccaneers – Game summary

Quarter	1	2	3	4	Total
Eagles	0	7	3	7	17
Buccaneers	7	10	0	7	24

at Tampa Stadium, Tampa, Florida

- Date: December 29, 1979
- Game time: 12:30 p.m. EST
- Game weather: 73 °F (23 °C), scattered clouds
- Game attendance: 71,402
- Referee: Fred Silva
- TV announcers (CBS): Curt Gowdy and Hank Stram

Game information

First quarter

- TB – Ricky Bell 4-yard run (Neil O'Donoghue kick). Buccaneers 7–0.

Second quarter

- TB – Neil O'Donoghue 40-yard field goal. Buccaneers 10–0.
- TB – Ricky Bell 1-yard run (Neil O'Donoghue kick). Buccaneers 17–0.
- PHI – Charlie Smith 11-yard pass from Ron Jaworski (Tony Franklin kick). Buccaneers 17–7.

Third quarter

- PHI – Tony Franklin 42-yard field goal. Buccaneers 17–10.

Fourth quarter

- TB – Jimmie Giles 9-yard pass from Doug Williams (Neil O'Donoghue kick). Buccaneers 24–10.
- PHI – Harold Carmichael 37-yard pass from Ron Jaworski (Tony Franklin kick). Buccaneers 24–17.

Top passers

- PHI – Ron Jaworski – 15/39, 199 yards, 2 TD
- TB – Doug Williams – 7/15, 132 yards, TD, INT

Top rushers

- PHI – Wilbert Montgomery – 13 rushes, 35 yards
- TB – Ricky Bell – 38 rushes, 142 yards, 2 TD

Top receivers

- PHI – Harold Carmichael – 3 receptions, 92 yards, TD
- TB – Jimmie Giles – 3 receptions, 43 yards, TD
