= Charlie Smith (wide receiver) =

American football player (born 1950)

No. 85
- Position: Wide receiver

Personal information
- Born: July 26, 1950 (age 76); Monroe, Louisiana, U.S.
- Listed height: 6 ft 1 in (1.85 m)
- Listed weight: 185 lb (84 kg)

Career information
- High school: Richwood (LA)
- College: Grambling State
- NFL draft: 1973: undrafted

Career history
- Los Angeles Rams (1973)*; Philadelphia Eagles (1974–1981); Boston Breakers (1983); New Orleans Breakers (1984)
- * Offseason or practice squad member only

Career NFL statistics
- Receptions: 218
- Receiving yards: 3,349
- Receiving touchdowns: 24
- Stats at Pro Football Reference

Charles Albert Smith (born July 26, 1950) is an American former professional football player who was a wide receiver for eight seasons (1974–1981) with the Philadelphia Eagles in the National Football League (NFL). He played college football for the Grambling State Tigers. He also played pro ball in the United States Football League (USFL).

== Professional career ==
=== Los Angeles Rams ===
Smith signed as an undrafted free agent with the Los Angeles Rams following the 1973 NFL draft. At the beginning of the 1973 season, the Rams released Smith, and attempted to re-sign him for the 1974 season. Smith did not re-sign with them, because he knew that all the Rams' receivers would be coming back the following season, and Lance Rentzel would be back after being suspended for the season.

=== Philadelphia Eagles ===
Smith thought he would have a better chance at making the Philadelphia Eagles' team, and signed with them. Eagles wide receiver Harold Carmichael, who attended Southern University, was Smith's rival in college due to their teams playing in the same conference. Eagles defensive end Ricky Harris played with Smith at Grambling State.

In 1974, Smith returned four punts for seven yards and did not catch any passes. In 1975, Smith became the Eagles starting wide receiver alongside Carmichael. Smith caught 37 passes for 515 yards and six touchdowns in his first season as a starter. He also rushed for 85 yards on nine carries. In 1976, Smith caught 27 passes for 412 yards and four touchdowns. He had nine carries for 25 yards and one touchdown. In 1977, Smith made 33 receptions for 464 yards and four touchdowns. He also had two carries for 13 yards. In 1978, he caught 11 passes for 142 yards and two touchdowns. He made 24 catches for 399 yards and one touchdown in 1979.

In 1980, Smith had the best season of his career, hauling in 47 passes for 825 yards and three touchdowns. He rushed five times for 33 yards. In Super Bowl XV against the Oakland Raiders, Smith caught two passes for 59 yards. In his final season in 1981, Smith made 38 receptions for 564 yards and four touchdowns, along with two rushes for five yards.

Smith caught 218 passes for 3,349 yards and 24 touchdowns in the eight seasons of his career.

=== Boston/New Orleans Breakers ===
Smith played for the Boston/New Orleans Breakers of the USFL in 1983 and 1984, before retiring.

== NFL career statistics ==
Legend
**Bold**	Career high

=== Regular season ===
Year	Team	Games		Receiving				
Year	Team	GP	GS	Rec	Yds	Avg	Lng	TD
1974	PHI	14	0	1	28	**28.0**	28	0
1975	PHI	14	12	37	515	13.9	46	**6**
1976	PHI	14	14	27	412	15.3	**48**	4
1977	PHI	14	14	33	464	14.1	32	4
1978	PHI	14	5	11	142	12.9	27	2
1979	PHI	**16**	12	24	399	16.6	39	1
1980	PHI	**16**	**16**	**47**	**825**	17.6	46	3
1981	PHI	**16**	14	38	564	14.8	45	4
		118	87	218	3,349	15.4	48	24

=== Playoffs ===
Year	Team	Games		Receiving				
Year	Team	GP	GS	Rec	Yds	Avg	Lng	TD
1978	PHI	1	0	**7**	**108**	15.4	27	0
1979	PHI	**2**	**2**	4	57	14.3	25	**1**
1980	PHI	1	0	2	59	**29.5**	**43**	0
1981	PHI	1	0	2	19	9.5	12	0
		5	2	15	243	16.2	43	1

== Coaching career ==
From 1985 to 2005, Smith was a high school football head coach in his hometown of Monroe, Louisiana, mostly at Wossman High School. Since 1988, Smith has been Wossman High School's track coach.

== Personal ==
Smith is married to his wife, Bernice, and has two sons, Charles, Jr. and Eric, and five grandchildren.
