= Mark Burke (American football) =

American football player (born 1954)

No. 29
- Position: Defensive back

Personal information
- Born: June 10, 1954; Marietta, Ohio, U.S.

Career information
- High school: Marietta
- College: West Virginia
- NFL draft: 1976: undrafted

Career history
- Atlanta Falcons (1976)*; Philadelphia Eagles (1976)
- * Offseason or practice squad member only

Career NFL statistics
- Games played: 1
- Games started: 0
- Punt returns-yards: 1-14
- Stats at Pro Football Reference

Mark Allen Burke (born June 10, 1954) is an American former professional football player who was a defensive back in the National Football League (NFL) for the Philadelphia Eagles. He played college football for the West Virginia Mountaineers.

Burke played in one game for the 1976 Philadelphia Eagles, where he took one punt return for a total of 14 yards.
