= Jim Opperman =

American football player (1953–2026)

No. 54
- Position: Linebacker

Personal information
- Born: December 18, 1953; Waterbury, Connecticut, U.S.
- Died: March 18, 2026 (aged 72); Aurora, Colorado, U.S.
- Listed height: 6 ft 2 in (1.88 m)
- Listed weight: 220 lb (100 kg)

Career information
- High school: Lakewood
- College: Colorado State
- NFL draft: 1975: undrafted

Career history
- Philadelphia Eagles (1975)
- Stats at Pro Football Reference

James Jay Opperman (December 18, 1953 – March 18, 2026) was an American professional football player who was a linebacker for the Philadelphia Eagles of the National Football League (NFL) in 1975. He played college football for the Colorado State Rams.

== Biography ==
Opperman played 10 games for the Philadelphia Eagles in the 1975 season, only making a single kick-off return for 15 yards. He debuted on Sunday September 21 against the New York Giants at home and played his last game against the Dallas Cowboys on Sunday November 23, 1975 at home. He was dropped from the playing squad in November.

Starting in 1978 until his death, he coached wrestling for Smoky Hill High School. Opperman died in Aurora, Colorado on March 18, 2026, at the age of 72. His death was publicly announced on the Smoky Hill Wrestling Instagram page one week later.
