= 1977 Los Angeles Rams season =

NFL team season

- Owner: Carroll Rosenbloom
- Head coach: Chuck Knox
- Home stadium: Los Angeles Memorial Coliseum

Results
- Record: 10–4
- Division place: 1st NFC West
- Playoffs: Lost Divisional Playoffs (vs. Vikings) 7–14

Uniform
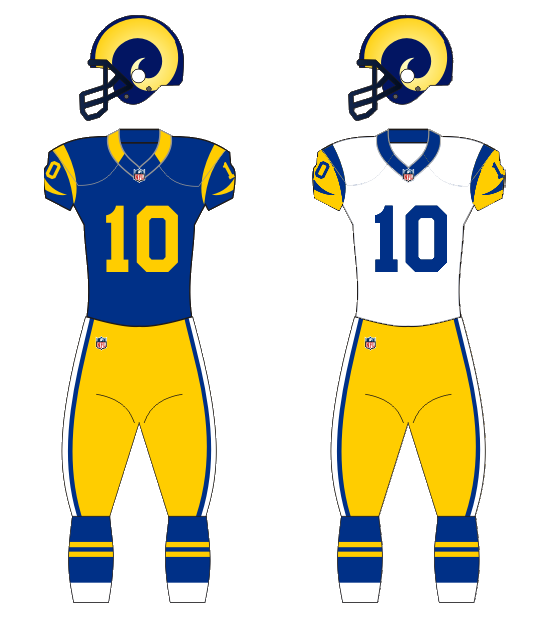

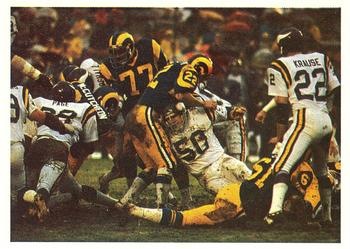
The Rams playing against the Vikings in the 1977 NFC Divisional Playoffs

The 1977 Los Angeles Rams season was the team's 40th year with the National Football League and the 32nd season in Los Angeles.

Hobbled by chronic knee woes, quarterback Joe Namath was waived by the New York Jets after the 1976 season, after they were unable to trade him. Namath signed with the Rams in May 1977. Hope of a Rams revival sprung when Los Angeles won two of their first three games, but Namath was hampered by low mobility. After a poor performance in a Monday Night loss to the Bears, Namath never saw NFL game action again.

After a home playoff loss to the Minnesota Vikings 14–7 on a saturated field in game which has been termed the "Mud Bowl", Rams head coach Chuck Knox was fired due to ownership's frustration that Knox had not been able to reach the Super Bowl.

== Offseason ==
=== NFL draft ===
1977 Los Angeles Rams draft
Round	Pick	Player	Position	College	Notes
1	23	Bob Brudzinski	Linebacker	Ohio State	
2	31	Nolan Cromwell *	Safety	Kansas	from Buffalo through Seattle via Dallas
2	50	Billy Waddy	Wide receiver	Colorado	
3	68	Ed Fulton	Guard	Maryland	from San Diego
3	79	Wendell Tyler *	Running back	UCLA	
4	91	Vince Ferragamo	Quarterback	Nebraska	from New Orleans
4	107	Earl Jones	Defensive end	Memphis State	
5	130	Donnie Hickman	Guard	USC	from Washington
5	134	Jeff Williams	Guard	Rhode Island	
6	156	Art Best	Running back	Kent State	
8	218	Rod Bockwoldt	Safety	Weber State	
10	274	Don Peterson	Tight end	Boston College	
11	302	Carson Long	Kicker	Pittsburgh	
12	321	Barry Caudill	Center	Southern Miss	
Made roster * Made at least one Pro Bowl during career

=== Undrafted free agents ===
1977 undrafted free agents of note
Player	Position	College
Nate Alexander	Defensive end	UC Riverside
Oscar Edwards	Safety	UCLA
Averell Harris	Wide receiver	Shippensburg State
Ron Jamerson	Running back	USC
Glen Walker	Punter	USC
Walter Wingard	Running Back/Kick Returner	Dayton

== Roster ==
1977 Los Angeles Rams roster
Quarterbacks (QB): 15 Vince Ferragamo; 11 Pat Haden; 12 Joe Namath; Running backs (RB): 32 Cullen Bryant; 22 John Cappelletti; 44 Sonny Collins; 43 Jim Jodat; 30 Lawrence McCutcheon; 39 Rod Phillips; 26 Wendell Tyler; Wide receivers (WR): 29 Harold Jackson; 88 Freeman Johns; 87 Dwight Scales; 80 Billy Waddy; Tight ends (TE): 83 Terry Nelson; 86 Charle Young	Offensive linemen (OL): 77 Doug France T; 73 Winston Hill T; 63 Greg Horton G; 65 Tom Mack G; 51 Rick Nuzum C; 61 Rich Saul C; 78 Jackie Slater T; 75 John Williams T; Defensive linemen (DL): 90 Larry Brooks DT; 70 Al Cowlings DE; 89 Fred Dryer DE; 79 Mike Fanning DT; 76 Cody Jones DT; 85 Jack Youngblood DE	Linebackers (LB): 59 Bob Brudzinski OLB; 55 Carl Ekern MLB; 54 Bob Pifferini OLB; 64 Jack Reynolds MLB; 58 Isiah Robertson OLB; 53 Jim Youngblood OLB; Defensive backs (DB): 21 Nolan Cromwell FS; 42 Dave Elmendorf SS; 28 Monte Jackson CB; 49 Rod Perry CB; 48 Bill Simpson FS; 27 Pat Thomas CB; 20 Jackie Wallace SS; Special teams (ST): 1 Rafael Septién K; 19 Glen Walker P	Reserve: 68 Ed Fulton G (IR); 60 Dennis Harrah G (IR); 66 Donnie Hickman G (IR); 81 Ron Jessie WR (IR); 50 Kevin McLain LB (IR); 82 Willie Miller WR (IR); 33 Rob Scribner RB (IR); 62 Jeff Williams G (IR); Rookies in italics

== Regular season ==
=== Schedule ===
Week	Date	Opponent	Result	Record	Venue	Recap
1	September 18	at **Atlanta Falcons**	**L** 6–17	0–1	Atlanta-Fulton County Stadium	Recap
2	September 25	Philadelphia Eagles	**W** 20–0	1–1	Los Angeles Memorial Coliseum	Recap
3	October 2	**San Francisco 49ers**	**W** 34–14	2–1	Los Angeles Memorial Coliseum	Recap
4	October 10	at Chicago Bears	**L** 23–24	2–2	Soldier Field	Recap
5	October 16	**New Orleans Saints**	**W** 14–7	3–2	Los Angeles Memorial Coliseum	Recap
6	October 24	Minnesota Vikings	**W** 35–3	4–2	Los Angeles Memorial Coliseum	Recap
7	October 30	at **New Orleans Saints**	**L** 26–27	4–3	Louisiana Superdome	Recap
8	November 6	Tampa Bay Buccaneers	**W** 31–0	5–3	Los Angeles Memorial Coliseum	Recap
9	November 13	at Green Bay Packers	**W** 24–6	6–3	Milwaukee County Stadium	Recap
10	November 20	at **San Francisco 49ers**	**W** 23–10	7–3	Candlestick Park	Recap
11	November 27	at Cleveland Browns	**W** 9–0	8–3	Cleveland Stadium	Recap
12	December 4	Oakland Raiders	**W** 20–14	9–3	Los Angeles Memorial Coliseum	Recap
13	December 11	**Atlanta Falcons**	**W** 23–7	10–3	Los Angeles Memorial Coliseum	Recap
14	December 17	at Washington Redskins	**L** 14–17	10–4	Robert F. Kennedy Memorial Stadium	Recap
Note: Intra-division opponents are in **bold** text.

=== Game summaries ===
==== Week 1 ====
Namath threw a 27-yard touchdown pass to Harold Jackson early, but then it was all Falcons as their defense totally shut down the running game. Scott Hunter, starting in place of injured Steve Bartkowski, directed a ball-control attack and ran for a touchdown.

==== Week 2 ====
- TV Network: CBS
- Announcers: Don Criqui, Emerson Boozer
- Attendance: 46,031

Namath passed for two touchdowns in this game, 14 yards to Lawrence McCutcheon and 2 yards to Terry Nelson. Rafael Septién provided the other scoring with 2 extra points and 2 field goals (20 and 23). It also turned out to be the final two touchdowns Namath would ever throw in his Hall of Fame career.

==== Week 3 ====
McCutcheon and John Cappelletti both ran for two touchdowns in this blowout. Jim Plunkett was completely ineffective against the Rams defense.

Team	1	2	3	4	Total
49ers	7	0	7	0	14
• Rams	3	14	0	17	34

- Date: October 2
- Location: Los Angeles Memorial Coliseum, Los Angeles, California
- Game start: 1:00 p.m.
- Game weather: 66 °F (19 °C) • Wind 8 mph (13 km/h)
- TV announcers (CBS): Vin Scully, Sonny Jurgensen

Scoring summary
1	LA	Rafael Septién 33 yard field goal	Rams 3–0
1	SF	Delvin Williams 17 yard pass from Jim Plunkett (Tom Wittum kick)	49ers 7–3
2	LA	Lawrence McCutcheon 6 yard run (Rafael Septién kick)	Rams 10–7
2	LA	John Cappelletti 1 yard run (Rafael Septién kick)	Rams 17–7
3	SF	Delvin Williams 3 yard run (Tom Wittum kick)	Rams 17–14
4	LA	Rafael Septién 24 yard field goal	Rams 20–14
4	LA	John Cappelletti 1 yard run (Rafael Septién kick)	Rams 27–14
4	LA	Lawrence McCutcheon 1 yard run (Rafael Septién kick)	Rams 34–14

==== Week 4 ====
Namath's final NFL start and game. He was 16 for 40 and once again victimized by no running game. Rams did get off to a 13–0 lead, but Bears QB Bob Avellini completed two long touchdown passes to James Scott and Walter Payton ran for 126 yards to bring the Bears back.

==== Week 5 ====
- TV Network: CBS
- Announcers: Tim Ryan, Sonny Jurgensen
- Attendance: 46,045

Pat Haden took back over as the starting quarterback and led a ball-control attack with McCutcheon gaining 152 yards and rookie Wendell Tyler scoring his first career NFL touchdown on a 16-yard run.

==== Week 6 ====
In a Monday Night blowout, Haden passed for two touchdowns and ran for another. The Rams' defense sacked Fran Tarkenton four times and intercepted him twice, both by rookie Pat Thomas.

==== Week 7 ====
In a wild game at the New Orleans Superdome, the Saints won on a 31-yard field goal by Rich Szaro with 16 seconds left.

- TV Network: CBS
- Announcers: Vin Scully and Alex Hawkins

==== Week 8 ====
- TV Network: CBS
- Announcers: Bob Costas and Sonny Jurgensen

Haden continued to roll with two more touchdown passes and Jim Youngblood scored on a 25-yard interception return and handed the Buccaneers their 22nd straight loss.

==== Week 9 ====
McCutcheon and Tyler each scored running touchdowns and Haden passed for another.

==== Week 10 ====
Rookie wide receiver Billy Waddy scored his first NFL touchdown on a pass from Haden and McCutcheon scored on a 42-yard run.

==== Week 11 ====
Rams won slug-it-out game in the mud despite Haden throwing 3 INT's. Cappelletti scored on a 7-yard run and Rafael Septién added a field goal.

==== Week 12 ====
Against the defending Super Bowl champions, the Rams survived a late scoring drive and a touchdown pass by Ken Stabler by answering with a 43-yard Haden-to-Harold Jackson touchdown bomb with around two minutes left. The win clinched the Rams' fifth straight division title.

Team	1	2	3	4	Total
Raiders	0	7	0	7	14
• Rams	7	0	3	10	20

- Date: December 4
- Location: Los Angeles Memorial Coliseum, Los Angeles
- Game start: 4:00 p.m.
- Game attendance: 67,075
- Game weather: Sunny; 57 °F (14 °C); wind 6 mph (9.7 km/h)
- Referee: Red Cashion
- TV announcers (NBC): Curt Gowdy

Scoring summary
Q1	LA	Cappelletti 1 yard run (Septien kick)	LA 7–0
Q2	OAK	Banaszak 1 yard run (Mann kick)	Tie 7–7
Q3	LA	Septién 21 yard field goal	LA 10–7
Q4	LA	Septién 44 yard field goal	LA 13–7
Q4	OAK	Casper 21 yard pass from Stabler (Mann kick)	OAK 14–13
Q4	LA	Jackson 43 yard pass from Haden (Septién kick)	LA 20–14

==== Week 13 ====
- TV Network: CBS

Rams avenged their season-opening loss to the Falcons as Haden ran for a touchdown and passed for another to Cappelletti.

==== Week 14 ====
In the cold and rain at RFK Stadium, Redskins quarterback Billy Kilmer threw for two early touchdowns. Rookie backup quarterback Vince Ferragamo nearly led the Rams back in the second half with two touchdowns of his own, but Septién missed a potential game-tying FG with no time left. It turned out to be George Allen's final regular-season game as an NFL coach.

=== Playoffs ===
Round	Date	Opponent (seed)	Result	Record	Venue	Recap
Divisional	December 26	Minnesota Vikings (3)	**L** 14–7	0–1	Los Angeles Memorial Coliseum	Recap

=== Standings ===
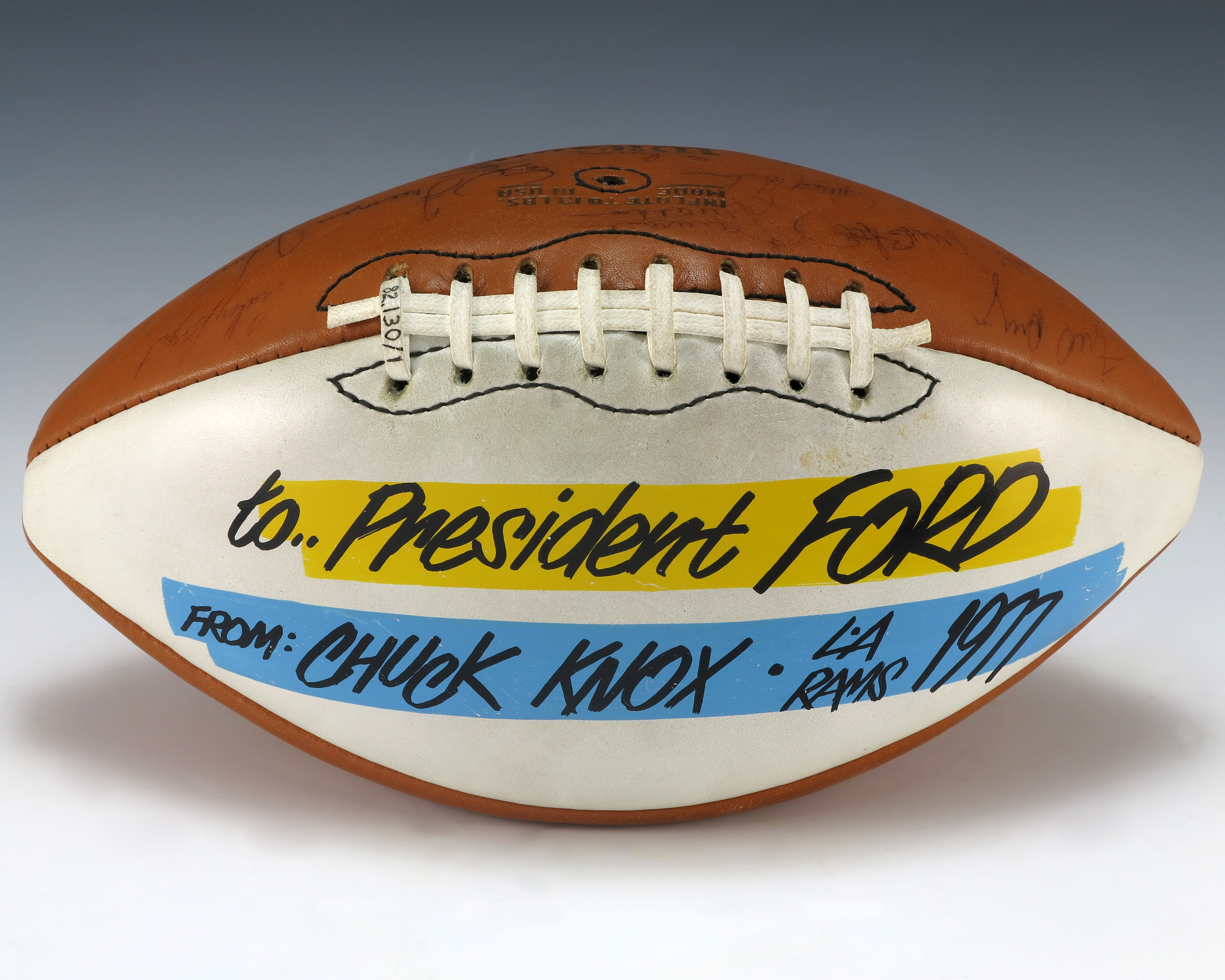
A football signed by the 1977 Los Angeles Rams, including Tom Mack, Joe Namath, Pat Haden, and Vince Ferragamo.

NFC West
	W	L	T	PCT	DIV	CONF	PF	PA	STK
^{(2)} Los Angeles Rams	10	4	0	.714	4–2	8–4	302	146	L1
Atlanta Falcons	7	7	0	.500	3–3	7–5	179	129	W1
San Francisco 49ers	5	9	0	.357	3–3	5–7	220	260	L3
New Orleans Saints	3	11	0	.214	2–4	3–9	232	336	L4
