= Eric Johnson (defensive back, born 1952) =

American football player (born 1952)

No. 49, 24
- Position: Defensive back

Personal information
- Born: July 23, 1952 (age 74); Ephrata, Washington, U.S.
- Listed height: 6 ft 1 in (1.85 m)
- Listed weight: 192 lb (87 kg)

Career information
- High school: Moses Lake
- College: Washington State
- NFL draft: 1974: undrafted

Career history
- Southern California Sun (1974-1975); San Francisco 49ers (1976)*; Philadelphia Eagles (1977–1978); San Francisco 49ers (1979); Los Angeles Rams (1981)*; New Jersey Generals (1983); New Orleans Breakers (1984)
- * Offseason or practice squad member only

Eric Johnson (born July 23, 1952) is an American former professional football player who was a defensive back for the Philadelphia Eagles and the San Francisco 49ers of the National Football League (NFL). He played college football for the Washington State Cougars.

Following his retirement from professional football, Johnson worked as a football coach and teacher at Fountain Valley High School in Southern California.
