= Willie Cullars =

American football player (born 1951)

No. 75
- Position: Defensive end

Personal information
- Born: August 4, 1951 (age 75); Washington, Georgia, U.S.
- Listed height: 6 ft 5 in (1.96 m)
- Listed weight: 250 lb (113 kg)

Career information
- High school: Central (Washington)
- College: Kansas State
- NFL draft: 1974: 7th round, 167th overall pick

Career history
- Philadelphia Eagles (1974); Philadelphia Bell (1975)
- Stats at Pro Football Reference

Willie Edward Cullars (born August 4, 1951) is an American former professional football player who was a defensive end for the Philadelphia Eagles of the National Football League (NFL) in 1974. He played college football for the Kansas State Wildcats.
