= Johnny Jackson (American football) =

American football player (born 1953)

No. 62
- Position: Defensive tackle

Personal information
- Born: July 1, 1953 (age 73); Lima, Ohio, U.S.
- Listed height: 6 ft 3 in (1.91 m)
- Listed weight: 250 lb (113 kg)

Career information
- High school: Lima Senior
- College: Southern
- NFL draft: 1977: 9th round, 243rd overall pick

Career history
- St. Louis Cardinals (1977)*; Philadelphia Eagles (1977)
- * Offseason or practice squad member only
- Stats at Pro Football Reference

John Jackson (born July 1, 1951) is an American former professional football player who was a defensive tackle for the Philadelphia Eagles of National Football League (NFL). He played college football for the Southern University.
