= Charle Young =

American football player (1951–2026)

- Young at USC

No. 86, 87
- Position: Tight end

Personal information
- Born: February 5, 1951; Fresno, California, U.S.
- Died: May 6, 2026 (aged 75)
- Listed height: 6 ft 4 in (1.93 m)
- Listed weight: 234 lb (106 kg)

Career information
- High school: Edison (Fresno)
- College: USC (1970–1972)
- NFL draft: 1973: 1st round, 6th overall pick

Career history
- Philadelphia Eagles (1973–1976); Los Angeles Rams (1977–1979); San Francisco 49ers (1980–1982); Seattle Seahawks (1983–1985)

Awards and highlights
- Super Bowl champion (XVI); First-team All-Pro (1973); 2× Second-team All-Pro (1974, 1975); 3× Pro Bowl (1973–1975); National champion (1972); Unanimous All-American (1972); Second-team All-American (1971); First-team All-Pac-8 (1972)

Career NFL statistics
- Receptions: 418
- Receiving yards: 5,106
- Receiving touchdowns: 27
- Stats at Pro Football Reference
- College Football Hall of Fame

Charles Edward Young (February 5, 1951 – May 6, 2026) was an American professional football player who was a tight end for 13 seasons in the National Football League (NFL). He played college football for the USC Trojans and was selected by the Philadelphia Eagles in the first round of the 1973 NFL draft. He played in the NFL for the Eagles (1973–1976), the Los Angeles Rams (1977–1979), the San Francisco 49ers (1980–1982), and the Seattle Seahawks (1983–1985).

== Early life ==
Young attended Edison High School in Fresno, California, where he led his high school basketball team to the valley playoffs. Following high school, he went on to a college and professional career playing football.

== College career ==
A unanimous first-team All-American in 1972, Young appeared in the Hula Bowl and College All-Star Game. A First-team All-Conference selection, he led USC to a Pacific-8 Conference title and a national championship in 1972. Named USC's Lineman of the Year in 1972, Young set a school record for receptions by a tight end with 62. In three seasons, he amassed 1,008 receiving yards and ten touchdowns. He was inducted into the College Football Hall of Fame in 2004.

== Professional career ==
Following graduation, Young earned Rookie of the Year honors with the Philadelphia Eagles in 1973 and went on to play for 13 seasons in the NFL with four teams. He played in the Pro Bowl in 1973, 1974, and 1975. He was traded from the Eagles to the Los Angeles Rams for Ron Jaworski on 9 March 1977. He played in Super Bowl XIV with the Rams. He was acquired along with third- (77th overall–Craig Puki) and fourth-round (98th overall–Houston linebacker David Hodge) selections in 1980 by the San Francisco 49ers from the Rams for third-round picks in 1980 (58th overall–Jewerl Thomas) and 1983 (63rd overall–traded to the New York Giants) on 28 April 1980. He won Super Bowl XVI with the 49ers in 1981. The following year, he changed his name to Charle, explaining "People had a problem. They thought they had better call me Charlie or Chuck. But Chuck doesn't fit me, and they didn't know if they should spell the other one Charlie or Charley. So I decided to find a shorter name that would make it easier for them, and I decided on Charle. Call me Charlie if you want but spell it Charle." He was a key contributor on the final 89-yard drive that led to the play that has been immortalized as "The Catch" in the 1981 NFC Playoffs versus the Dallas Cowboys. He also played with the Seattle Seahawks.

== Personal life and death ==
Young volunteered with the United Way of America, the Fred Hutchinson Cancer Society, and the Pacific Northwest Athletic Congress. A volunteer for the 1990 Goodwill Games, he participated in the Black Men Professional Breakfast and was a board member of the Wee Care Childcare Center.

Young died on May 6, 2026, at the age of 75.

== NFL career statistics ==
Legend
| | Won the Super Bowl |
| **Bold** | Career high |

=== Regular season ===
| Year | Team | Games | | Receiving | | | | |
| Year | Team | GP | GS | Rec | Yds | Avg | Lng | TD |
|---|---|---|---|---|---|---|---|---|
| 1973 | PHI | 14 | 14 | 55 | **854** | **15.5** | **80** | **6** |
| 1974 | PHI | 14 | 14 | **63** | 696 | 11.0 | 29 | 3 |
| 1975 | PHI | 14 | 14 | 49 | 659 | 13.4 | 47 | 3 |
| 1976 | PHI | 14 | 14 | 30 | 374 | 12.5 | 29 | 0 |
| 1977 | RAM | 14 | 0 | 5 | 35 | 7.0 | 17 | 1 |
| 1978 | RAM | **16** | 3 | 18 | 213 | 11.8 | 19 | 0 |
| 1979 | RAM | 15 | 0 | 13 | 144 | 11.1 | 23 | 2 |
| 1980 | SFO | **16** | 15 | 29 | 325 | 11.2 | 41 | 2 |
| 1981 | SFO | **16** | **16** | 37 | 400 | 10.8 | 29 | 5 |
| 1982 | SFO | 9 | 9 | 22 | 189 | 8.6 | 30 | 0 |
| 1983 | SEA | **16** | **16** | 36 | 529 | 14.7 | 47 | 2 |
| 1984 | SEA | 15 | 13 | 33 | 337 | 10.2 | 31 | 1 |
| 1985 | SEA | 14 | 14 | 28 | 351 | 12.5 | 32 | 2 |
| | | 187 | 142 | 418 | 5,106 | 12.2 | 80 | 27 |

=== Playoffs ===
| Year | Team | Games | | Receiving | | | | |
| Year | Team | GP | GS | Rec | Yds | Avg | Lng | TD |
|---|---|---|---|---|---|---|---|---|
| 1977 | RAM | 1 | 0 | 0 | 0 | 0.0 | 0 | 0 |
| 1978 | RAM | 2 | 0 | 2 | 30 | 15.0 | 15 | 0 |
| 1979 | RAM | 2 | 0 | 3 | 39 | 13.0 | 22 | 0 |
| 1981 | SFO | **3** | **3** | **7** | **81** | 11.6 | 17 | **1** |
| 1983 | SEA | **3** | **3** | 3 | 47 | **15.7** | **28** | **1** |
| 1984 | SEA | 2 | 2 | 1 | 5 | 5.0 | 5 | 0 |
| | | 13 | 8 | 16 | 202 | 12.6 | 28 | 2 |
