= Wade Key =

American football player (born 1946)

No. 76, 72
- Positions: Guard, Tackle

Personal information
- Born: October 14, 1946 (age 80); San Antonio, Texas, U.S.
- Listed height: 6 ft 5 in (1.96 m)
- Listed weight: 245 lb (111 kg)

Career information
- High school: Edison (San Antonio)
- College: Texas (1964-1966); Texas State (1967-1968)
- NFL draft: 1969: 13th round, 314th overall pick

Career history
- Pottstown Firebirds (1969); Philadelphia Eagles (1970–1979)

Awards and highlights
- Philadelphia Eagles 75th Anniversary Team; Texas State Bobcats Hall of Honor (1983)

Career NFL statistics
- Games played: 121
- Games started: 115
- Fumble recoveries: 4
- Stats at Pro Football Reference

Allan Wade Key (born October 14, 1946) is an American former professional football player who was a guard and offensive tackle for 10 seasons with the Philadelphia Eagles of the National Football League (NFL) from 1970 to 1979. After playing college football for Southwest Texas State University, he was selected in the 13th round of the 1969 NFL/AFL draft by the Eagles. He was named to the Eagles' 75th Anniversary Team in 2007.

== Early life ==
Key attended Edison High School in San Antonio, Texas. He lettered in football and track and field. In the Hub City Relays in Alice, Texas, in 1963, Key placed fifth in the discus. He played tight end in football, and was selected to an all-star team for the Texas High School Coaches Association clinic in 1964.

== College career ==
After graduating high school, Key played college football and competed in track and field for Texas from 1964 to 1966, but after 3 years on the football team he had not lettered, so he transferred to Southwest Texas State University where he became the starting tight end. In track and field, he placed first in the shot put during the Lone Star Conference finals with 54 feet 3.25 inches (16.54 metres) in May 1967. He finished fourth in the discus in the finals. In the Texas Relays in April 1968, Key placed third in the shot put with 55 feet 9.5 inches (17.01 metres). He was inducted into the Texas State Bobcats Hall of Honor in 1983.

== Professional career ==
Key was selected by the Philadelphia Eagles in the 13th round (314th overall) of the 1969 NFL/AFL draft. He signed a contract with the team on February 16, but he was released before the start of the 1969 season on September 2, 1969. He spent the season on the team's taxi squad and played for the Pottstown Firebirds of the Atlantic Coast Football League (ACFL) during his tenure. The Firebirds won the ACFL championship in 1969.

After starting at left offensive tackle from 1970 to 1972, and missing only one game in that span, Key was moved to left guard for the 1973 season. He played in 12 games in 1973, missing two due to injury, and all 14 games in 1974, despite suffering hand and thumb injuries in a game against the Washington Redskins. During the 1975 season, he suffered a knee injury during mini-camp in May that required surgery, a dislocated toe in the first game of the season against the New York Giants that was thought to take at least six weeks to recover from, and a fractured forearm in practice on October 16 that also required surgery. He was placed on injured reserve due to the broken arm on October 17 after playing in only two games during the season. From 1976 to 1978, he played in 40 games and started in 39 of them.

In 1979, Key was the Eagles' longest-tenured player with ten seasons played. After missing six games in 1979 due to hamstring and groin injuries, and undergoing surgery to remove calcium deposits in his leg, he was waived by the team on September 1, 1980.

Key finished his career with 121 games played, and was selected as a member of a 75th anniversary team in honor of the Eagles' 75th season in 2007.

== After football ==
After his NFL career was over, Key was a track and football coach for more than seventeen years for John Jay High School, Floresville Middle School, and Sam Houston High School in San Antonio. He was the offensive coordinator at Sam Houston.
