= Jim Cagle =

American football player (born 1952)

No. 78
- Position: Defensive tackle

Personal information
- Born: January 15, 1952 (age 74); Jacksonville, Florida, U.S.
- Listed height: 6 ft 5 in (1.96 m)
- Listed weight: 255 lb (116 kg)

Career information
- High school: Marietta (Marietta, Georgia)
- College: Georgia
- NFL draft: 1974: 5th round, 108th overall pick

Career history
- Philadelphia Eagles (1974); Philadelphia Eagles (1975)*; Tampa Bay Buccaneers (1976)*
- * Offseason or practice squad member only
- Stats at Pro Football Reference

James Colquitt Cagle (born January 15, 1952) is an American former professional football player who was a defensive tackle in the National Football League (NFL). Cagle was born in Jacksonville, Florida, in 1952. He attended Marietta High School in Marietta, Georgia, and played college football for the Georgia Bulldogs from 1971 to 1973. He then played in the NFL for the Philadelphia Eagles, appearing in 14 games during the 1974 season, though his playing time in 1975 was principally on special teams and goal line defense. He returned to the Eagles in 1975. However, he did not appear on the final roster.

He signed with the Tampa Bay Buccaneers in 1975, appearing in pre-season games.
