= Mike Boryla =

American football player (born 1951)

No. 10
- Position: Quarterback

Personal information
- Born: March 6, 1951 (age 75); Rockville Centre, New York, U.S.
- Listed height: 6 ft 3 in (1.91 m)
- Listed weight: 200 lb (91 kg)

Career information
- High school: Regis (Denver, Colorado)
- College: Stanford
- NFL draft: 1974: 4th round, 87th overall pick

Career history
- Philadelphia Eagles (1974–1976); Tampa Bay Buccaneers (1977–1978)

Awards and highlights
- Pro Bowl (1975); First-team All-Pac-8 (1973)

Career NFL statistics
- Passing attempts: 519
- Passing completions: 272
- Completion percentage: 52.4%
- TD–INT: 20–29
- Passing yards: 2,838
- Passer rating: 58.1
- Stats at Pro Football Reference

Michael Jay Boryla (born March 6, 1951) is an American former professional football player who was a quarterback in the National Football League (NFL) for the Philadelphia Eagles and Tampa Bay Buccaneers in the 1970s. He played college football at Stanford University, where he was the team's MVP during his senior season in 1973 and was first-team All-Pacific-8.

He was selected by the Cincinnati Bengals in the fourth round of the 1974 NFL draft Boryla was soon traded to the Eagles for first- and sixth-round draft picks after Cincinnati acquired another quarterback in Wayne Clark; Boryla had threatened to defect to the new World Football League if not traded. The move reunited Boryla with Eagles head coach Mike McCormack, who worked with him at that year's Senior Bowl. Boryla spent much of his tenure in Philadelphia sharing quarterbacking duties with veteran Roman Gabriel. In 1975, he was named to the Pro Bowl roster despite losing the starting job partway through the season opener and throwing for just 996 passing yards, six touchdowns, and twelve interceptions. Boryla, who had planned to attend the New York University School of Law, was approached by the NFL to play in the game in New Orleans as other NFC quarterbacks were injured and declined their invitations. He threw two touchdown passes in the final minutes of the Monday night game at the Louisiana Superdome, including a trick play he created called the "Boryla Special", to lead the NFC to a 23–20 win.

Boryla started ten games for the Eagles in 1976 before joining the Tampa Bay Buccaneers in 1977. After missing the year with a knee injury (which head coach John McKay called "the most devastating single blow we've had"), he played one more game in 1978 before ending his playing career.

After retiring, he attended the Stetson University College of Law before becoming a lawyer and mortgage banker in Denver. In 2014, Boryla made his professional acting debut at Plays and Players Theatre in Philadelphia performing The Disappearing Quarterback, a one-man autobiographical theatrical performance that includes history, wit, and thinly veiled opinions regarding professional sports concussions.

His father Vince Boryla was an NBA player and executive; he also acted as his agent during his NFL career.
