= Tom Sullivan (American football) =

American football player (1950–2002)

No. 25, 26
- Position: Running back

Personal information
- Born: March 5, 1950; Jacksonville, Florida, U.S.
- Died: October 10, 2002 (aged 52); Summerville, South Carolina, U.S.
- Listed height: 6 ft 0 in (1.83 m)
- Listed weight: 190 lb (86 kg)

Career information
- High school: Duncan U. Fletcher (FL)
- College: Miami
- NFL draft: 1972: 15th round, 378th overall pick

Career history
- Philadelphia Eagles (1972–1977); Cleveland Browns (1978)

Career NFL statistics
- Rushing attempts: 876
- Rushing yards: 3,142
- Rushing touchdowns: 17
- Stats at Pro Football Reference

Thomas Ashley Sullivan (March 5, 1950 – October 10, 2002) was an American professional football running back with two National Football League (NFL) teams.

== College football career ==
Sullivan was a running back with Miami (FL) from 1969 to 1971.

- 1969: 79 carries for 319 yards. 9 catches for 86 yards.
- 1970: 156 carries for 461 yards. 9 catches for 48 yards.
- 1971: 150 carries for 761 yards and 2 TD. 18 catches for 198 yards.

== NFL career ==
His best success came with the Philadelphia Eagles. In his second year with the team, Sullivan surpassed the 900 yard rushing yard mark and in his third year he led the NFL in rushing touchdowns. Sullivan made news when his first wife, from whom he separated but never divorced, and second wife both claimed his pension. He died in a car accident in 2002.

== NFL career statistics ==
Legend
	Led the league
**Bold**	Career high

Year	Team	Games		Rushing					Receiving				
Year	Team	GP	GS	Att	Yds	Avg	Lng	TD	Rec	Yds	Avg	Lng	TD
1972	PHI	12	0	13	13	1.0	5	0	4	17	4.3	7	0
1973	PHI	13	13	217	**968**	**4.5**	**37**	4	**50**	**322**	6.4	29	1
1974	PHI	**14**	**14**	**244**	760	3.1	28	**11**	39	312	8.0	23	1
1975	PHI	**14**	12	173	632	3.7	28	0	28	276	9.9	**35**	0
1976	PHI	13	8	99	399	4.0	26	2	14	116	8.3	21	1
1977	PHI	**14**	13	125	363	2.9	14	0	26	223	8.6	30	**2**
1978	CLE	4	0	5	7	1.4	5	0	1	20	**20.0**	20	0
		84	60	876	3,142	3.6	37	17	162	1,286	7.9	35	5
