= Blenda Gay =

American football player (1950–1976)

No. 68
- Position: Defensive end

Personal information
- Born: November 22, 1950; Greenville, North Carolina, U.S.
- Died: December 20, 1976 (aged 26); Camden, New Jersey, U.S.

Career information
- College: Fayetteville State
- NFL draft: 1973: Supplemental, Oakland Raidersth round

Career history
- 1974: San Diego Chargers
- 1975–1976: Philadelphia Eagles
- Stats at Pro Football Reference

Blenda Glen Gay (November 22, 1950 – December 20, 1976) was an American professional football player who was a defensive end in the National Football League (NFL). He played college football for the Fayetteville State Broncos. Gay played three seasons in the NFL for the San Diego Chargers and Philadelphia Eagles. He was killed by his wife in 1976.

== Biography ==
Blenda Gay attended H. B. Sugg High School in Farmville, North Carolina. After high school, he attended Fayetteville State University in Fayetteville, North Carolina. There he started on the football team winning all-CIAA and Division II All-American.

Gay was selected in the 1973 NFL supplemental draft by the Oakland Raiders but was cut in training camp. He was picked up in 1974 by the San Diego Chargers and saw action in two games. He had also played for a semi-pro football team called the Model City Diplomats for $75 per game.

In 1975, Gay was signed by the Philadelphia Eagles where he became a regular fixture on the defensive line for two seasons. Gay played in every regular season game for the Eagles in both 1975 and 1976.

== Murder ==
In December, 1976, Roxanne Gay cut her husband's throat as he slept, killing him. She was charged with the murder by the Camden County, New Jersey district attorney. Roxanne claimed that the attack on her husband was purely self-defense and alleged that her husband was extremely violent and abusive. Camden police indicated that she had made over 20 calls to the police in three and a half years. Neighbors claimed that after an Eagles' loss, Gay "bounced his wife off the walls". His wife had signed a complaint against Gay after one hospital stay, but later dropped the complaint.

The case became a cause célèbre for the feminist movement due to the allegations of long-term domestic violence. Gloria Steinem and Ms. magazine helped raise money for her defense. Ms. magazine alleged that when Roxanne called the police, officers would often discuss football with Blenda.

A panel of psychiatrists in a sanity hearing found that Blenda Gay had not abused his wife, and Roxanne Gay's attorney admitted there was no evidence that the beatings had occurred. Ultimately, Roxanne Gay was determined to have schizophrenia and confined to the Trenton Psychiatric Hospital. All charges were dropped. She was released in 1980.

Beginning in 1977, there was an annual "Gay Game" held each December. This ceased after the game in 1979.

== See also ==
- List of gridiron football players who died during their careers
