= Deac Sanders =

American football player (born 1950)

John Sanders
No. 25, 26
- Positions: Cornerback, Safety

Personal information
- Born: January 11, 1950 (age 76); Chicago, Illinois, U.S.
- Listed height: 6 ft 1 in (1.85 m)
- Listed weight: 175 lb (79 kg)

Career information
- College: South Dakota
- NFL draft: 1973: undrafted

Career history
- New England Patriots (1974–1976); Philadelphia Eagles (1977–1979)

Career NFL statistics
- Interceptions: 17
- INT yards: 240
- Touchdowns: 2
- Stats at Pro Football Reference

John Maurice "Deac" Sanders (born January 11, 1950) is an American former professional football player who was a defensive back in the National Football League. Sanders played college football for the South Dakota Coyotes. He was signed by the New England Patriots as an undrafted free agent in 1974 and played with them for 3 years, first as a cornerback and then as a safety. Sanders then replaced Bill Bradley as the starting free safety for the Philadelphia Eagles in 1977, Dick Vermeil's second year as the Eagle head coach, and also in 1978. But in 1979, his final year, he played only one game, replaced by Brenard Wilson.

== Personal ==
Sanders was a schoolteacher when the Patriots signed him in 1974.
