= James Betterson =

American football player (born 1954)

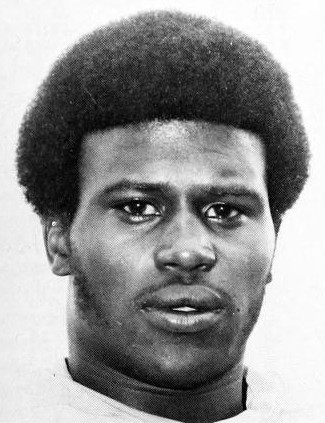
- Betterson in circa 1976

No. 34
- Position: Running back

Personal information
- Born: August 20, 1954 (age 72); Blackshear, Georgia, U.S.
- Listed height: 6 ft 0 in (1.83 m)
- Listed weight: 210 lb (95 kg)

Career information
- High school: High Point Central (High Point, North Carolina)
- College: North Carolina
- NFL draft: 1976: 8th round, 224th overall pick

Career history
- Philadelphia Eagles (1977–1978)

Awards and highlights
- First-team All-ACC (1974)

Career NFL statistics
- Rushing attempts: 73
- Rushing yards: 265
- Rushing TDs: 1
- Stats at Pro Football Reference

James Thomas Betterson (born August 20, 1954) is an American former professional football player who was a running back for the Philadelphia Eagles of the National Football League (NFL). He played college football for the North Carolina Tar Heels.
