= Harold Carmichael =

American football player and administrator (born 1949)

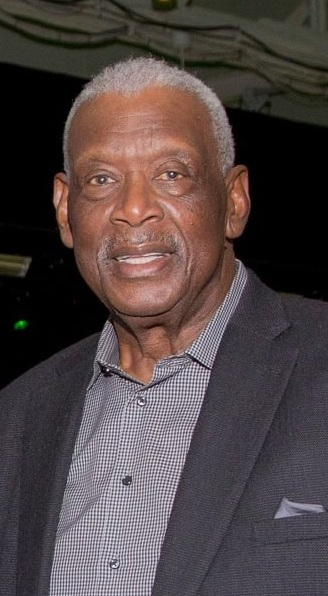
- Carmichael in 2023

No. 17
- Position: Wide receiver

Personal information
- Born: September 22, 1949 (age 77); Jacksonville, Florida, U.S.
- Listed height: 6 ft 8 in (2.03 m)
- Listed weight: 225 lb (102 kg)

Career information
- High school: William M. Raines (Jacksonville)
- College: Southern (1967–1970)
- NFL draft: 1971: 7th round, 161st overall pick

Career history

Playing
- Philadelphia Eagles (1971–1983); New York Jets (1984)*; Dallas Cowboys (1984)
- * Offseason or practice squad member only

Operations
- Philadelphia Eagles (1998–2017) Director of Player and Community Relations

Awards and highlights
- As a player: NFL Man of the Year (1980); 2× Second-team All-Pro (1973, 1979); 4× Pro Bowl (1973, 1978–1980); NFL receiving yards leader (1973); NFL receptions leader (1973); NFL 1970s All-Decade Team; Philadelphia Eagles Hall of Fame; Philadelphia Eagles 75th Anniversary Team; First-team All-SWAC (1970); Black College Football Hall of Fame; Southwestern Athletic Conference Hall of Fame; Louisiana Sports Hall of Fame; Florida Sports Hall of Fame; As an administrator: Super Bowl champion (LII)

Career NFL statistics
- Receptions: 590
- Receiving yards: 8,985
- Receiving touchdowns: 79
- Stats at Pro Football Reference
- Pro Football Hall of Fame

Lee Harold Carmichael (born September 22, 1949) is an American former professional football player who was a wide receiver in the National Football League (NFL) for thirteen seasons with the Philadelphia Eagles (1971–1983) and one year with the Dallas Cowboys (1984). He played college football for the Southern Jaguars. After his playing career, Carmichael was the director of player development and alumni for the Eagles from 1998 to 2014, and a fan engagement liaison from 2014 to 2015.

At 6 feet 8 inches, Carmichael is tied with Dan McGwire for the tallest player to record a touchdown pass in NFL history.

== Early life ==
Carmichael attended William M. Raines High School in Jacksonville, Florida, where he played the trombone in the school's band. He began playing quarterback on the football team.

He walked-on at Southern University and became a tri-sport athlete. He used his 6'8" height to play on the basketball team as a center, and threw the javelin and discus for the track and field team. In football, he shifted to playing wide receiver, where he was a four-year starter, although he never led the team in receptions. He received All-conference honors as a senior. He was a teammate of Mel Blount.

In 1989, he was inducted into the Louisiana Sports Hall of Fame. In 2004, he was inducted into the Florida Sports Hall of Fame. In 2012, he was inducted into the Southwestern Athletic Conference Hall of Fame. In 2018, he was inducted into the Black College Football Hall of Fame. In January 2020, he was elected as one of 10 seniors to the Centennial Slate for the Class of 2020 of the NFL Pro Football Hall of Fame.

== Professional career ==
Carmichael was selected by the Philadelphia Eagles in the seventh round (161st overall) of the 1971 NFL draft. As a rookie, he was converted into a tight end, starting in six out of the nine games and leading the team's tight ends with twenty receptions (fourth on the team).

The next year he was moved to wide receiver. In 1973, he had a breakout year with the arrival of head coach Mike McCormack, leading the league with 67 receptions for 1,116 yards (16.7-yard average) and was tied for fourth with nine receiving touchdowns.

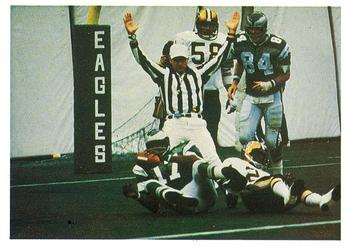
Carmichael scoring a touchdown with the Eagles in 1977.

His production fell in the next three seasons as the team struggled to find a reliable quarterback. In 1977, Ron Jaworski was named the starting quarterback, with Carmichael leading the team with 46 receptions for 665 yards and seven touchdowns.

He was elected to four Pro Bowls in his NFL career. He finished third in receiving yards in 1978 with 1,072 and was second in receiving touchdowns in 1979 with eleven.

In 1980, he set an NFL record at the time by catching passes in 127 consecutive NFL games while also helping the Eagles make an appearance in Super Bowl XV.

On May 11, 1984, he was waived by the Eagles. On August 8, he was signed as a free agent by the New York Jets, who were looking to improve their depth at wide receiver while Wesley Walker held out in a contract dispute and Lam Jones recovered from a broken collarbone. He was released on August 26.

On September 6, he signed with the Dallas Cowboys, who were looking for wide receiver depth after Tony Hill was injured in the season opener 20–13 win against the Los Angeles Rams. He played in two games and caught only one pass before being cut on November 14 and announcing his retirement.

He ended his career with 590 receptions for 8,985 yards with 79 career touchdown catches, along with 64 rushing yards on nine carries. He currently ranks 25th all-time in career touchdown receptions, but he was seventh all-time at the time of his retirement. His career catches ranked fifth all-time when he retired. He retired as the Eagles' all-time leader in pass receptions, receiving yards, receiving touchdowns, and total touchdowns (79), with all four records still standing as of early 2017. He also holds Eagles post-season records for receiving yards (465), touchdowns (six), yards per reception (sixteen), and yards per game (66.4). He and Brent Celek are the only Eagles with three touchdowns in a single post-season (1979), and he is one of four players with two touchdowns in a single post-season game. He holds the Eagles record for most games with a touchdown for both the regular season (69) and playoffs (five, shared with Duce Staley and Brian Westbrook). At 6 foot 8 inches, he is believed to be the tallest wide receiver in the history of the NFL. He is also one of only a few players able to throw a football from one end zone to the other end zone.

Carmichael was selected to the NFL 1970s All-Decade Team by voters of the Pro Football Hall of Fame. From 1973 to 1983, Carmichael led all NFL receivers in receptions, receiving yards, and touchdowns. In 1987, he was inducted into the Eagles Hall of Fame. The Professional Football Researchers Association named him to the PRFA Hall of Very Good Class of 2009.

On January 15, 2020, Carmichael was elected to the Pro Football Hall of Fame Class of 2020.

== Personal life ==
After retiring from his playing career, he settled in South Jersey and joined a Philadelphia travel agency as a vice president for sales. He later operated various businesses, including steel fabrication and sports marketing.

In 1998, Carmichael was named the director of player and community relations for the Eagles, a newly created position where he would be a "combination mentor, confidant, troubleshooter, and liaison between the players and the authority figures in the organization". He was moved to a Fan Engagement Liaison position in 2014, and retired from that role on April 2, 2015. He currently works as an ambassador for the team in his retirement.

== NFL career statistics ==
Year	Team	Games		Receiving				
Year	Team	GP	GS	Rec	Yds	Avg	Lng	TD
1971	PHI	9	6	20	288	14.4	50	0
1972	PHI	13	2	20	276	13.8	54	2
1973	PHI	14	14	67	1,116	16.7	73	9
1974	PHI	14	14	56	649	11.6	39	8
1975	PHI	14	13	49	639	13.0	62	7
1976	PHI	14	14	42	503	12.0	24	5
1977	PHI	14	14	46	665	14.5	50	7
1978	PHI	16	16	55	1,072	19.5	56	8
1979	PHI	16	16	52	872	16.8	50	11
1980	PHI	16	16	48	815	17.0	56	9
1981	PHI	16	16	61	1,028	16.9	85	6
1982	PHI	9	8	35	540	15.4	46	4
1983	PHI	15	11	38	515	13.6	35	3
1984	DAL	2	0	1	7	7.0	7	0
Career		182	160	590	8,985	15.2	85	79
