= Jeff Bleamer =

American football player and coach (born 1953)

Cane Bay Cobras
- Title: Assistant coach

Personal information
- Born: June 22, 1953 (age 73); Allentown, Pennsylvania, U.S.
- Listed height: 6 ft 4 in (1.93 m)
- Listed weight: 253 lb (115 kg)

Career information
- High school: Louis E. Dieruff (Allentown)
- College: Penn State
- NFL draft: 1975: 8th round, 198th overall pick

Career history

Playing
- Philadelphia Eagles (1975–1976); New York Jets (1977)

Coaching
- Colorado (1985–1986) Offensive line coach; The Citadel (1987–1997) Offensive line coach; East Tennessee State (1997–2002) Offensive line coach; Ohio (2003–2004) Offensive line coach; Hamilton Tiger-Cats (2007–2008) Offensive line coach; Edmonton Eskimos (2009–2010) Offensive line coach; Cane Bay HS (SC) (2011–present) Assistant coach
- Stats at Pro Football Reference

Jeffrey Harrison Bleamer (born June 22, 1953) is an American former professional football player who was a tackle and guard in the National Football League (NFL). He played college football for the Penn State Nittany Lions. He played in the NFL for the Philadelphia Eagles from 1975 to 1976 and the New York Jets in 1977.
