= Will Wynn (American football) =

American football player (1949–2013)

William Wynn
No. 71, 70
- Position: Defensive end

Personal information
- Born: January 15, 1949; Apex, North Carolina, U.S.
- Died: June 4, 2013 (aged 64); Philadelphia, Pennsylvania, U.S.
- Listed height: 6 ft 4 in (1.93 m)
- Listed weight: 245 lb (111 kg)

Career information
- High school: Huntington (VA)
- College: Tennessee State
- NFL draft: 1973: 7th round, 159th overall pick

Career history
- Philadelphia Eagles (1973–1976); Washington Redskins (1977)

Career NFL statistics
- Games played: 55
- Games started: 27
- Touchdowns: 2
- Stats at Pro Football Reference

William Wynn (January 15, 1949 – June 4, 2013) was an American professional football defensive end who played for five seasons in the National Football League (NFL) for the Philadelphia Eagles from 1973–1976, and Washington Redskins in 1977. He was selected by the Eagles in the seventh round of the 1973 NFL draft. He played college football at Tennessee State.

Wynn died at the age of 64 of heart failure at Einstein Medical Center in Philadelphia, Pennsylvania.
