= Tom Ehlers =

American football player (born 1952)

No. 59, 56
- Position: Linebacker

Personal information
- Born: July 14, 1952 (age 74); South Bend, Indiana, U.S.
- Listed height: 6 ft 2 in (1.88 m)
- Listed weight: 218 lb (99 kg)

Career information
- High school: Adams (South Bend)
- College: Kentucky
- NFL draft: 1975: 13th round, 323rd overall pick

Career history
- Philadelphia Eagles (1975–1977); Buffalo Bills (1978)

Career NFL statistics
- Interceptions: 1
- Stats at Pro Football Reference

Thomas Slick Ehlers (born July 14, 1952) is an American former professional football player who was a linebacker in the National Football League (NFL). He played college football for the Kentucky Wildcats and was selected by the Philadelphia Eagles in the 13th round of the 1975 NFL draft. He played in the league for the Eagles and Buffalo Bills.

He currently resides in Mishawaka, Indiana. Ehlers is the son of former National Basketball Association (NBA) player Bulbs Ehlers. In 1988, he joined his father in the Indiana Football Hall of Fame.
