= Horst Mühlmann =

German gridiron football player (1940–1991)

Horst Herbert Erich Mühlmann
- Born: 2 January 1940; Dortmund, Germany
- Died: 17 November 1991 (aged 51); Selm, Germany
- Height: 1.85 m (6 ft 1 in)
Association football career
- Position: Goalkeeper
Youth career
- BV Brambauer
- Borussia Dortmund
Senior career*
Years	Team	Apps	(Gls)
1961–1966	Schalke 04	69	(0)
1966–1967	Bonner SC	29	(0)
1968	Kansas City Spurs	1	(0)
- * Club domestic league appearances and goals
- Football career

No. 16
- Position: Kicker

Career history
- Cincinnati Bengals (1969–1974); Philadelphia Eagles (1975–1977)
- Stats at Pro Football Reference

Horst Herbert Erich Mühlmann (2 January 1940 – 17 November 1991) was a professional footballer and American football player. He was a placekicker in the American Football League (AFL) and the National Football League (NFL) for nine seasons. He played for the Kansas City Chiefs (1969), the Cincinnati Bengals (1969–1974) and the Philadelphia Eagles (1975–1977).

Mühlmann was born in Dortmund, Germany. After high school, he worked as a bricklayer and part-time footballer. He played as a goalkeeper for Schalke 04 from 1961 to 1966, including the first ever Bundesliga season in 1963–64. In 1968, he played soccer in the North American Soccer League (NASL) for the Kansas City Spurs.

His professional career in American football began in 1969 with the Kansas City Chiefs when he was 29 years old. Mühlmann quickly established a reputation as one of the longest kickers in the game. On 4 September 1971, in a pre-season encounter with the Green Bay Packers, he launched each of his six kickoffs over the crossbar into the endzone denying the Packers a single kickoff return yard. Mühlmann was the first kicker since the AFL-NFL merger to connect on field goals of 50 yards or more in three consecutive games. This record has only been matched by three other players: Tom Dempsey (1971), Chris Bahr (1981) and Jason Elam (1996). Mühlmann held the Bengals team record for consecutive extra points (101) until it was broken by Doug Pelfrey in 1997. Mühlmann still holds or shares several Bengals regular season and post season individual kicking records. In 1970 he set a franchise record by making four 50-yard field goals in one season, which would stand until broken by Evan McPherson in 2021.

The money Mühlmann earned during his time in the U.S. he invested in an apartment house in Selm where he lived with his family until he died from a chronic lung disease. The Horst Mühlmann Bars are located in the North and South endzones on the Plaza level of Cincinnati's Paycor Stadium.

== See also ==
- Other American Football League players
