= Tom Luken (American football) =

American football player (born 1959)

No. 63
- Position: Guard

Personal information
- Born: June 15, 1950 (age 76); Cincinnati, Ohio, U.S.
- Listed height: 6 ft 3 in (1.91 m)
- Listed weight: 253 lb (115 kg)

Career information
- High school: La Salle (Cincinnati)
- College: Purdue
- NFL draft: 1972: 3rd round, 68th overall pick

Career history
- Philadelphia Eagles (1972–1978)

Awards and highlights
- Second-team All-American (1971); First-team All-Big Ten (1971)

Career NFL statistics
- Games played: 64
- Games started: 17
- Stats at Pro Football Reference

Tom Luken (born June 15, 1950) is an American former professional football player who was an offensive lineman for six seasons with the Philadelphia Eagles of the National Football League (NFL). He played college football for the Purdue Boilermakers.
