= Frank LeMaster =

American football player (1952–2023)

No. 55
- Position: Linebacker

Personal information
- Born: March 12, 1952; Lexington, Kentucky, U.S.
- Died: March 23, 2023 (aged 71)
- Listed height: 6 ft 2 in (1.88 m)
- Listed weight: 232 lb (105 kg)

Career information
- High school: Bryan Station (Lexington)
- College: Kentucky
- NFL draft: 1974: 4th round, 89th overall pick

Career history
- Philadelphia Eagles (1974–1983); San Francisco 49ers (1984)*
- * Offseason or practice squad member only

Awards and highlights
- Pro Bowl (1981); Kentucky Pro Football Hall of Fame (2007)

Career NFL statistics
- Games played: 129
- Sacks: 14.5
- Interceptions: 10
- Stats at Pro Football Reference

Frank Preston LeMaster (March 12, 1952 – March 23, 2023) was an American professional football player who was a linebacker for nine seasons in the National Football League (NFL) for the Philadelphia Eagles. A native of Lexington, Kentucky, he played four years of college football for the Kentucky Wildcats and was selected by the Eagles in the fourth round of the 1974 NFL draft. He was a key member of Philadelphia's defense for several years, and along with Bill Bergey and John Bunting, led one of the best 1970s linebacking corps in the league. He helped them reach Super Bowl XV in 1980 and was selected to his first and only Pro Bowl the following season. However, he missed 1983 due to injury and was traded to the San Francisco 49ers in 1984. He was unable to make the final roster of the 49ers and retired afterwards.

== Early life and education ==
LeMaster was born on March 12, 1952, in Lexington, Kentucky. He attended Bryan Station High School where he played fullback for the football team. Despite seeing major action only in his last two seasons, he compiled 40 touchdowns, 3,000 yards, and helped the team reach the Class AA state finals. After graduating, LeMaster played four seasons of college football for the Kentucky Wildcats from 1970 to 1973. He spent his freshman year at fullback before changing to halfback as a sophomore. He started the first two games of 1971 at halfback, but only was given the ball 10 times, averaging four yards-per-carry.

LeMaster's coach then shifted him to being a reserve, and after playing three games in that role, was changed to being a tight end; he spent some time in that position, recording one reception for eight yards, but was then asked to play linebacker. He was then asked to return to being a halfback, before finally becoming a linebacker. All of these moves occurred during his sophomore year, although during this entire period (with the exception of his two starts at halfback) he only played on special teams.

Through the first five games of the 1972 season, LeMaster, remaining an inside linebacker, was the leading tackler on the team. However, after a loss to North Carolina, he was benched, with the coaching staff blaming him for poor defense. He was asked to switch to outside linebacker, but refused, and spent the rest of the year on the bench. He was a starter as a senior, but no NFL teams showed interest in him during the season. However, he was named All-American at the end of the year. He was also invited through the efforts of Kentucky assistant Buckshot Underwood to several all-star games, including the Blue–Gray Football Classic, at which he served as a team captain. His performance there led to him receiving interest from NFL scouts.

== Professional career ==
LeMaster was selected by the Philadelphia Eagles in the fourth round (89th overall) of the 1974 NFL draft. He was also selected in the 1974 WFL Draft, but remained with Philadelphia. As a rookie, he started all four preseason games and ended up making the team as the second-string left linebacker, behind Steve Zabel. He appeared in every game that year and became the starter the following year after Zabel was traded; LeMaster went on to be one of the anchors of the Eagles defense for the next several years, and along with Bill Bergey and John Bunting, formed one of the best linebacking corps in the NFL in the 1970s. He played a total of nine seasons for the team and appeared in all 129 of their games in that period, starting the final 115. Along with Robert Brazile, he was the only player at his position to start every NFL game from 1975 to 1982. As of March 2023, LeMaster is fourth all-time in team history for starts by a linebacker, trailing only William Thomas (129), Chuck Bednarik (122), and Bunting (116). When he retired, he placed sixth all-time for most consecutive games with Philadelphia and he also led the team in tackles four out of the nine seasons he played with them.

In LeMaster's first four seasons, the Eagles won only 20 out of 56 games. The team hired coach Dick Vermeil, and they went from 4–10 in 1976, to 5–9 in 1977, before reaching the playoffs as a wildcard in 1978 and making the playoffs again in 1979; LeMaster was a vital figure in helping the team turn around. Vermeil described him as "an outstandingly conditioned player. He was very respected by the coaching staff and players. He was just that kind of guy who had his head screwed on straight. Frank wasn't vocal with his ideas. He set examples." In 1980, he helped the team win the NFC Championship and reach Super Bowl XV, where they lost to the Oakland Raiders. Nevertheless, he was an important figure in their defense, which was first in the league for points allowed and second in yards allowed. The following year, he again led an Eagles defense that had the league-best for lowest points allowed, which as of the 2022 season remains the last year the team has accomplished this. He also earned his first and only Pro Bowl selection. The Eagles only won three games in the strike-shortened 1982 season and LeMaster missed the entire 1983 season due to an injury in preseason. He was traded to the San Francisco 49ers in 1984, and despite being told he had made the team, ended up being the final roster cut. He retired in 1985.

LeMaster played 129 games and started 115 in his career. He posted 10 interceptions, which he returned for 190 yards and two touchdowns. He also posted 14.5 unofficial sacks, and was occasionally used throughout his career on offense, posting eight rush attempts for 108 yards as well as one reception for −4 yards. He scored a total of three touchdowns in his career, being only one of three Eagles linebackers to accomplish this feat.

== Later life and family ==
LeMaster worked for Enron Energy Services in the Philadelphia area, among other businesses. LeMaster joined FieldTurf in 2001 and was vice president of sales when he retired in 2020. He was active in local charitable organizations. He was inducted into the Kentucky Pro Football Hall of Fame in 2007 and was selected to the Kentucky High School Hall of Fame in 2009, as well as the Chester County Sports Hall of Fame in 2011.

LeMaster was married three times. He and his first wife had both Justin and Brennan LeMaster. Frank and his second wife, Sandra Richardson, had one son: Alex LeMaster. His wife at the time of his death was Marylou LeMaster. He died on March 23, 2023, at age 71.
