= Stan Walters =

American football player (born 1948)

No. 75
- Position: Offensive tackle

Personal information
- Born: May 27, 1948 (age 78); Rutherford, New Jersey, U.S.
- Listed height: 6 ft 6 in (1.98 m)
- Listed weight: 275 lb (125 kg)

Career information
- High school: St. Mary (Rutherford)
- College: Syracuse
- NFL draft: 1972: 9th round, 210th overall pick

Career history
- Cincinnati Bengals (1972–1974); Philadelphia Eagles (1975–1983)

Awards and highlights
- Second-team All-Pro (1979); 2× Pro Bowl (1978, 1979); Philadelphia Eagles Hall of Fame

Career NFL statistics
- Games played: 153
- Stats at Pro Football Reference

Stanley Peter Walters Jr. (born May 27, 1948) is an American former professional football player who was an offensive tackle in the National Football League (NFL). After playing college football for Syracuse Orange, he was selected by the Cincinnati Bengals in the ninth round of the 1972 NFL draft. He spent three years with the Bengals, starting at left tackle for the majority of his tenure, before he was traded to the Philadelphia Eagles in 1975. A two-time Pro Bowl selection with the Eagles, Walters started in 122 consecutive games at left tackle in his nine years with the team. Following his retirement, he was a radio color commentator for the Eagles from 1984 through 1997.

== Early life ==
Walters grew up a New York Giants fan in Rutherford, New Jersey. His father worked as a machinist in Jersey City, New Jersey. Walters first attended Bordentown Military Institute in Bordentown, New Jersey, before transferring to St. Mary High School in Rutherford. He lettered in football and basketball in high school.

== College career ==
Walters was a two-year letterman in football for Syracuse University, and started at left guard in his senior season in 1971. He participated in the Senior Bowl in 1971. He majored in history at Syracuse. He was selected to the Syracuse All-Century team in 1999.

== Professional career ==
Walters was selected by the Cincinnati Bengals in the ninth round (210th overall) of the 1972 NFL draft. He began the 1972 season on the team's taxi squad, and he was promoted to the starting roster midway through the season owing to an injury to starter Rufus Mayes. Walters started the remaining eight games of the season at left offensive tackle. An unknown illness in 1973 resulted in his losing 14 pounds in a 10-day span and missing a game against the Cleveland Browns on October 6. He played in only four games that season. He returned as a starter in 1974 and played in all fourteen games.

The Bengals traded Walters and quarterback Wayne Clark to the Philadelphia Eagles in exchange for quarterback John Reaves and a 1976 second-round draft pick (which was used on guard Glenn Bujnoch) on July 3, 1975. Walters considered a meeting with head coach Dick Vermeil before the 1976 season as the critical moment in his playing career. Vermeil, who had just been hired by the Eagles, told Walters that if he did not start playing better he would be released. Walters said, "It shook me up. It definitely made a difference." He started in every game from 1975 through 1982 at left tackle. Harvey Martin, a defensive end who played for the Dallas Cowboys and frequently played against Walters, called Walters the smartest offensive tackle in the league during his career.

Walters earned two consecutive Pro Bowl selections, in 1978 and 1979. In 1979, Walters blocked for running back Wilbert Montgomery, who rushed for a team-record 1,512 yards. In 1980 he did not allow any sacks as the team's largest player at 275 pounds (125 kg). He injured his back in the first half of the 1981 NFC Championship Game against the Dallas Cowboys, but took a painkiller shot to go back into the game to help the team rush for 263 yards and advance to the Super Bowl. Walters played in Super Bowl XV against the Oakland Raiders. The Eagles lost the game, 27–10. Walters was limited by a strained knee in the beginning of the 1981 season.

Walters re-signed with the Eagles before training camp in 1983. He played in the first preseason game against the Detroit Lions, but had to leave the game due to an injury. Three days later, on August 8, he announced his retirement from football, saying "After 12 years of playing in the NFL, I earned the right to go to my head coach and just say I've fought my battle. It's over." However, when his replacement, Dean Miraldi, suffered a sprained knee in the next preseason game, Walters ended his week-long retirement to re-join the Eagles on August 15. The contract offered to him included a clause that the organization would put up a barn next to his house. He re-injured his knee against the St. Louis Cardinals on September 25 and had to leave the game. Before the November 20 game against the New York Giants, Walters was benched, along with four other starters, by head coach Marion Campbell in an attempt to rejuvenate the team with younger players after five straight losses. He finished the season with ten starts in twelve games. He ended a streak of 122 consecutive starts at left tackle for the Eagles during the 1983 season.

In 1991, Walters was inducted in the Philadelphia Eagles Ring of Honor with fellow offensive tackle Jerry Sisemore.

== After football ==
After retiring from football again after the 1983 season, Walters worked alongside Merrill Reese as a radio color commentator for the Eagles from 1984 to 1997 before he moved to Cobham, England when his wife, Kathy, got transferred in her job in the paper industry. The couple had previously lived in Alpharetta, Georgia. He and his wife lived in England for five years while Walters raised their two children. As of November 2010, Walters resides in Atlanta, Georgia.
