= 1983 Philadelphia Eagles season =

NFL team season

- Owner: Leonard Tose
- Head coach: Marion Campbell
- Home stadium: Veterans Stadium

Results
- Record: 5–11
- Division place: 4th NFC East
- Playoffs: Did not qualify

The 1983 Philadelphia Eagles season was their 51st in the National Football League (NFL). The team followed up their record of 3–6 during the strike-shortened 1982 season with another losing campaign. The team failed to qualify for the playoffs for the second straight season. The Eagles started off winning four of their first six games, before losing seven consecutive games. The Eagles finished in fourth place with a 5–11 record. Despite the disappointing season, second year wide receiver Mike Quick established himself as a new star by collecting 1,409 receiving yards.

== Offseason ==
=== NFL draft ===
Round	Pick	Player	Position	School
1	8	Michael Haddix	Running back	Mississippi State
2	35	Wes Hopkins	Safety	Southern Methodist
2	46	Jody Schulz	Linebacker	East Carolina
3	62	Glen Young	Wide receiver	Mississippi State
4	89	Mike Williams	Running back	Mississippi College
5	120	Byron Darby	Defensive tackle	USC
6	147	Victor Oatis	Wide receiver	Northwest Louisiana
7	174	Anthony Edgar	Running back	Hawaii
7	182	Jon Schultheis	Guard	Princeton
8	201	Rich Kraynak	Linebacker	Pittsburgh
9	232	Rich Pelzer	Tackle	Rhode Island
10	258	Thomas Strauthers	Defensive tackle	Jackson State
11	285	Steve Sebahar	Center	Washington State
12	312	David Mangrum	Quarterback	Baylor

== Personnel ==
=== Staff / Coaches ===
1983 Philadelphia Eagles staff
Front office: Owner – Leonard Tose; Director of Player Personnel – Lynn Stiles; Head coaches: Head Coach – Marion Campbell; Assistant Head Coach – Fred Bruney; Offensive coaches: Offensive Coordinator – Dick Wood; Running Backs – Billie Matthews; Receivers – John Becker; Tight Ends – Frank Gansz; Offensive Line – Ken Iman; Offensive Line – Jerry Wampfler	Defensive coaches: Defensive Coordinator – Marion Campbell; Defensive Line – Chuck Clausen; Linebackers – George Hill; Defensive Backs – Fred Bruney; Special teams coaches: Special Teams – Frank Gansz

=== Roster ===
1983 Philadelphia Eagles roster
Quarterbacks (QB): 7 Ron Jaworski; 6 Dan Pastorini; 9 Joe Pisarcik; Running backs (RB): 39 Major Everett; 26 Michael Haddix; 35 Perry Harrington; 31 Wilbert Montgomery; 34 Hubie Oliver; 32 Michael Williams; Wide receivers (WR): 17 Harold Carmichael; 85 Melvin Hoover; 82 Mike Quick; 83 Tony Woodruff; 89 Glen Young; Tight ends (TE): 87 Lawrence Sampleton	Offensive linemen (OL): 63 Ron Baker G; 72 Jim Fritzsche T/G; 77 Tom Jelesky T; 73 Steve Kenney G; 64 Dean Miraldi T; 74 Leonard Mitchell T; 50 Guy Morriss C; 76 Jerry Sisemore T; 61 Mark Slater C; 75 Stan Walters T; Defensive linemen (DL): 96 Harvey Armstrong NT; 98 Greg Brown DE; 71 Ken Clarke NT; 94 Byron Darby DE; 78 Carl Hairston DE; 68 Dennis Harrison DE; 93 Thomas Strauthers DE	Linebackers (LB): 57 Bill Cowher ILB; 58 Anthony Griggs ILB; 52 Rich Kraynak OLB; 56 Jerry Robinson OLB; 51 Reggie Wilkes OLB; 58 Joel Williams OLB; Defensive backs (DB): 25 Dennis DeVaughn CB; 46 Herm Edwards CB; 24 Ray Ellis SS; 29 Elbert Foules CB; 48 Wes Hopkins FS; 41 Randy Logan SS; 21 John Sciarra FS; 22 Brenard Wilson FS; 43 Roynell Young CB; Special teams (ST): 1 Tony Franklin K; 4 Max Runager P	Reserve: 67 Gerry Feehery C/G (IR); 84 Vyto Kab TE (IR); 55 Frank LeMaster LB (IR); 10 David Mangrum QB (IR); 62 Petey Perot G (IR); 53 Jody Schulz LB (IR); 88 John Spagnola TE (IR); 54 Zack Valentine LB (IR); Rookies in italics

== Schedule ==
Week	Date	Opponent	Result	Attendance
1	September 3, 1983	at San Francisco 49ers	**W** 22–17	55,775
2	September 11, 1983	**Washington Redskins**	**L** 23–13	69,542
3	September 18, 1983	at Denver Broncos	**W** 13–10	74,202
4	September 25, 1983	**St. Louis Cardinals**	**L** 14–11	64,465
5	October 2, 1983	at Atlanta Falcons	**W** 28–24	50,621
6	October 9, 1983	at **New York Giants**	**W** 17–13	73,291
7	October 16, 1983	at **Dallas Cowboys**	**L** 37–7	63,070
8	October 23, 1983	Chicago Bears	**L** 7–6	45,263
9	October 30, 1983	Baltimore Colts	**L** 22–21	59,150
10	November 6, 1983	**Dallas Cowboys**	**L** 27–20	71,236
11	November 13, 1983	at Chicago Bears	**L** 17–14	47,524
12	November 20, 1983	**New York Giants**	**L** 23–0	57,977
13	November 27, 1983	at **Washington Redskins**	**L** 28–24	54,324
14	December 4, 1983	Los Angeles Rams	**W** 13–9	32,867
15	December 11, 1983	New Orleans Saints	**L** 20–17 (OT)	45,182
16	December 18, 1983	at **St. Louis Cardinals**	**L** 31–7	21,902

Note: Intra-division opponents are in bold text.

The October 16 and November 6 games against the Dallas Cowboys were played with their locations switched from the original schedule, because of the October 16 conflict with the Phillies' game 5 of the 1983 World Series.

== Standings ==
NFC East
	W	L	T	PCT	DIV	CONF	PF	PA	STK
Washington Redskins^{(1)}	14	2	0	.875	7–1	10–2	541	332	W9
Dallas Cowboys^{(4)}	12	4	0	.750	7–1	10–2	479	360	L2
St. Louis Cardinals	8	7	1	.531	3–4–1	5–6–1	374	428	W3
Philadelphia Eagles	5	11	0	.313	1–7	4–10	233	322	L2
New York Giants	3	12	1	.219	1–6–1	3–8–1	267	347	L4

== Awards and honors ==
- Mike Quick, 1983 Pro Bowl selection
- Mike Quick, Associated Press first-team All-Pro selection 1983
