= 1983 New York Giants season =

NFL team season

- Owner: Wellington Mara
- General manager: George Young
- Head coach: Bill Parcells
- Home stadium: Giants Stadium

Results
- Record: 3–12–1
- Division place: 5th NFC East
- Playoffs: Did not qualify
- Pro Bowlers: LB Harry Carson; LB Lawrence Taylor; CB Mark Haynes; K Ali Haji-Sheikh

The 1983 New York Giants season was the franchise's 59th season in the National Football League (NFL). The Giants finished in last place in the National Football Conference East Division with a 3–12–1 record, the team’s worst record since 1976.

In the 1983 NFL draft, the Giants selected defensive back Terry Kinard in the first round, with the 10th overall pick. The 1983 season was the first for the Giants under Bill Parcells, who had been offered the position after previous head coach Ray Perkins resigned before succeeding Bear Bryant as the coach for the University of Alabama. Parcells named Scott Brunner the team’s starting quarterback, ahead of Phil Simms and Jeff Rutledge; upset with the decision, Simms requested a trade at one point during the season. New York was 2–2 in their first four games of the season, before a three-game losing streak that left the club at 2–5. Against the Philadelphia Eagles in their sixth game, the Giants inserted Simms into their lineup in place of Brunner; shortly afterward, Simms suffered a season-ending injury.

The St. Louis Cardinals hosted the Giants in a matchup on October 24 that the New York Daily News' Gary Myers later called the worst game in the history of Monday Night Football. After the Giants lost a lead late in the fourth quarter, the game went into overtime. The Cardinals missed three field goal attempts in the extra period, including two in the final 1:06, and the contest ended in a 20–20 tie. The Giants lost the following three games before a victory in Philadelphia, which was their final win of the season. Losses to the Los Angeles Raiders, St. Louis, Seattle, and Washington left the team’s final record at 3–12–1.

Ali Haji-Sheikh, the Giants' kicker, set a team record for points scored in a season; with 35 field goals and 22 conversions, he was responsible for 127 points. In addition, he set a team record for the longest field goal in a game versus Green Bay, with a 56-yard kick. Earnest Gray had 1,139 receiving yards, becoming the first Giants wide receiver in 15 years to exceed 1,000 yards.

== Personnel ==
=== Staff ===
1983 New York Giants staff
Front office: President – Wellington Mara; General Manager – George Young; Director of Pro Personnel – Ernie Adams; Head coaches: Head Coach – Bill Parcells; Offensive coaches: Offensive Coordinator – Ron Erhardt; Offensive Backfield – Bob Ledbetter; Receivers – Pat Hodgson; Offensive Line – Tom Bresnahan	Defensive coaches: Defensive Line – Lamar Leachman; Linebackers – Bill Belichick; Defensive Backfield – Len Fontes; Special teams coaches: Special Teams – Romeo Crennel

=== Roster ===
1983 New York Giants roster
Quarterbacks (QB): 12 Scott Brunner; 14 Tom Owen; 17 Jeff Rutledge; Running backs (RB): 45 Leon Bright; 27 Larry Heater; 20 Joe Morris; 38 John Tuggle; 21 Butch Woolfolk; Wide receivers (WR): 88 Floyd Eddings; 83 Earnest Gray; 82 Keith Hugger; 89 Mike Miller; 85 John Mistler; 87 Byron Williams; Tight ends (TE): 84 Zeke Mowatt; 81 Tom Mullady; 80 Malcolm Scott	Offensive linemen (OL): 67 Billy Ard G; 73 Kevin Belcher G; 60 Brad Benson T; 66 Chris Foote C; 61 Ernie Hughes C; 67 Billy Ard G; 63 Al Steinfeld G; 65 John Tautolo T; 68 J. T. Turner G; Defensive linemen (DL): 74 Charles Cook NT; 79 Dee Hardison DE; 70 Leonard Marshall DE; 75 George Martin DE; 71 Casey Merrill DE; 78 Jerome Sally NT	Linebackers (LB): 53 Harry Carson ILB; 54 Andy Headen OLB; 57 Byron Hunt OLB; 55 Brian Kelley ILB; 51 Frank Marion ILB; 56 Lawrence Taylor OLB; 10 Brad Van Pelt OLB; Defensive backs (DB): 29 Bill Currier SS; 46 Mike Dennis CB; 37 Larry Flowers FS; 36 Mark Haynes CB; 24 Terry Jackson CB; 43 Terry Kinard FS; 39 Mike Mayock SS; 33 LeCharls McDaniel CB; 44 Pete Shaw SS; Special teams (ST): 6 Ali Haji-Sheikh K; 13 Dave Jennings P	Reserve: 64 Jim Burt NT (IR); 26 Rob Carpenter RB (IR); -- Robbie Jones LB (IR); 72 Gordon King T (IR); -- Frank Magwood WR (IR); -- Phil McConkey WR (Military); 76 Curtis McGriff DE (IR); 52 Joe McLaughlin LB (IR); -- Karl Nelson T (IR); 86 Johnny Perkins WR (IR); 11 Phil Simms QB (IR); -- Phil Tabor DE (Ret.); 59 Rich Umphrey C (IR); 58 Mike Whittington LB (IR); -- Perry Williams CB (IR); Rookies in italics

== Schedule ==
Week	Date	Opponent	Result	Record	Venue	Attendance
1	September 4	Los Angeles Rams	L 6–16	0–1	Giants Stadium	75,281
2	September 11	at Atlanta Falcons	W 16–13	1–1	Atlanta–Fulton County Stadium	58,075
3	September 18	at Dallas Cowboys	L 13–28	1–2	Texas Stadium	62,347
4	September 26	Green Bay Packers	W 27–3	2–2	Giants Stadium	75,308
5	October 2	San Diego Chargers	L 34–41	2–3	Giants Stadium	73,892
6	October 9	Philadelphia Eagles	L 13–17	2–4	Giants Stadium	73,291
7	October 16	at Kansas City Chiefs	L 17–38	2–5	Arrowhead Stadium	55,449
8	October 24	at St. Louis Cardinals	T 20–20	2–5–1	Busch Memorial Stadium	45,630
9	October 30	Dallas Cowboys	L 20–38	2–6–1	Giants Stadium	76,142
10	November 7	at Detroit Lions	L 9–15	2–7–1	Pontiac Silverdome	68,985
11	November 13	Washington Redskins	L 17–33	2–8–1	Giants Stadium	71,482
12	November 20	at Philadelphia Eagles	W 23–0	3–8–1	Veterans Stadium	57,977
13	November 27	at Los Angeles Raiders	L 12–27	3–9–1	Anaheim Stadium	41,473
14	December 4	St. Louis Cardinals	L 6–10	3–10–1	Giants Stadium	25,156
15	December 11	Seattle Seahawks	L 12–17	3–11–1	Giants Stadium	48,945
16	December 17	at Washington Redskins	L 22–31	3–12–1	RFK Stadium	53,874

== Game summaries ==
=== Week 5: San Diego Chargers ===
Quarter	1	2	3	4	Total
Chargers	13	14	7	7	41
Giants	0	17	7	10	34

at Giants Stadium, East Rutherford, New Jersey

- Date: October 2
- Game time: 4:00 p.m.
- Game weather: 66 °F (19 °C), wind 8 mph (13 km/h)
- Referee: Gene Barth
- Box Score

Game information

First quarter

- SD: Rolf Benirschke 40 yard field goal
- SD: Rolf Benirschke 37 yard field goal
- SD: Chuck Muncie 1 yard rush (Rolf Benirschke kick)

Second quarter

- NYG: Ali Haji-Sheikh 20 yard field goal
- SD: Charlie Joiner 13 yard pass from Dan Fouts (Rolf Benirschke kick)
- NYG: Earnest Gray 51 yard pass from Scott Brunner (Ali Haji-Sheikh kick)
- SD: Kellen Winslow 16 yard pass from Dan Fouts (Rolf Benirschke kick)
- NYG: Danny Pittman 40 yard pass from Scott Brunner (Ali Haji-Sheikh kick)

Third quarter

- NYG: Rob Carpenter 1 yard rush (Ali Haji-Sheikh kick)
- SD: Chuck Muncie 2 yard rush (Rolf Benirschke kick)

Fourth quarter

- NYG: Tom Mullady 21 yard pass from Scott Brunner (Ali Haji-Sheikh kick)
- NYG: Ali Haji-Sheikh 37 yard field goal
- SD: Chuck Muncie 34 yard rush (Rolf Benirschke kick)

Passing

- SD: Dan Fouts 15/28, 215 yards, 2 TDs, 2 INTs, Ed Luther 9/13, 94 yards, INT
- NYG: Scott Brunner 31/51, 395 yards, 3 TDs, INT

Rushing

- SD: Chuck Muncie 17–87, James Brooks 3–25, Wes Chandler 1–23, Dan Fouts 1–0, Ed Luther 5–(−15)
- NYG: Rob Carpenter 18–35, Butch Woolfolk 6–18, Scott Brunner 3–12, Joe Morris 1–-11

Receiving

- SD: Kellen Winslow 8–99, Charlie Joiner 5–83, Eric Sievers 4–49, Wes Chandler 4–41, Chuck Muncie 2–33, Sherman Smith 1–4
- NYG: Earnest Gray 9–159, John Mistler 8–91, Danny Pittman 2–49, Butch Woolfolk 5–39, Tom Mullady 3–37, Rob Carpenter 4–20

Gill Byrd had an interception for San Diego.

=== Week 13: Los Angeles Raiders ===
Week 13: New York Giants at Los Angeles Raiders

Quarter	1	2	3	4	Total
Giants (3–9–1)	2	3	0	7	12
Raiders (10–3)	0	13	7	7	27

at Los Angeles Memorial Coliseum, Los Angeles

- Date: November 27, 1983
- Game time: 4:00 p.m. (ET)/1:00 p.m. (PT)
- Game weather: 54 °F (12 °C), relative humidity 41%, wind 7 mph (11 km/h)
- Game attendance: 41,473
- Referee: Fred Silva
- TV announcers (CBS): Pat Summerall (play-by-play), John Madden (color commentator)
- Pro-Football-Reference.com Box Score

Game information

First quarter

- NYG – Safety, Marshall tackled Plunkett in end zone – Giants 2–0

Second quarter

- LA – Hasselback 13-yard pass from Plunkett (Bahr kick) – Raiders 7–2
- LA – Bahr 47-yard field goal – Raiders 10–2
- NYG – Haji-Sheikh 31-yard field goal – Raiders 10–5
- LA – Bahr 38-yard field goal – Raiders 13–5

Third quarter

- LA – Barnwell 36-yard pass from Plunkett (Bahr kick) – Raiders 20–5

Fourth quarter

- LA – Allen 11-yard run (Bahr kick) – Raiders 27–5
- NYG – Williams 43-yard pass from Brunner (Haji-Sheikh kick) – Raiders 27–12

Vegas Odds

- Vegas Line=LA -10.0 (Won)
- Over/Under=41.0 (Under)

Giants

- Scott Brunner
  19/41, 346 Yds, TD, 3 INTs
- Butch Woolfolk
  23 Rush, 52 Yds
- Earnest Gray
  5 Rec, 134 Yds
  Byron Williams
  5 Rec, 119 Yds, TD

Raiders

- Jim Plunkett
  19/32, 243 Yds, 2 TDs
- Marcus Allen
  13 Rush, 64 Yds, TD
- Cliff Branch
  5 Rec, 83 Yds
  Malcolm Barnwell
  5 Rec, 82 Yds, TD

== Standings ==
NFC East
	W	L	T	PCT	DIV	CONF	PF	PA	STK
^{(1)} Washington Redskins	14	2	0	.875	7–1	10–2	541	332	W9
^{(4)} Dallas Cowboys	12	4	0	.750	7–1	10–2	479	360	L2
St. Louis Cardinals	8	7	1	.531	3–4–1	5–6–1	374	428	W3
Philadelphia Eagles	5	11	0	.313	1–7	4–10	233	322	L2
New York Giants	3	12	1	.219	1–6–1	3–8–1	267	347	L4
