= Cleveland Crosby =

American football player (born 1956)

No. 73, 78
- Position: Defensive end

Personal information
- Born: April 3, 1956 (age 70); West Point, Mississippi, U.S.
- Listed height: 6 ft 5 in (1.96 m)
- Listed weight: 250 lb (113 kg)

Career information
- High school: East St. Louis (IL)
- College: Purdue; Arizona
- NFL draft: 1980: 2nd round, 54th overall pick

Career history
- Cleveland Browns (1980)*; Buffalo Bills (1981)*; Baltimore Colts (1982); Green Bay Packers (1983)*; Houston Gamblers (1984-1985)
- * Offseason or practice squad member only

Awards and highlights
- Third-team All-American (1979); First-team All-Pac-10 (1979); Second-team All-Pac-10 (1978)

Career NFL statistics
- Games played: 9
- Games started: 0
- Stats at Pro Football Reference

Cleveland Pittsburgh Crosby (born April 3, 1956) is an American former professional football player who was a defensive end for the Baltimore Colts of the National Football League (NFL). He was selected by the Cleveland Browns in the second round of the 1980 NFL draft. He started his college football career with the Purdue Boilermakers before transferring and finishing his career with the Arizona Wildcats.
