= Dino Mangiero =

American football player (born 1958)

No. 74, 73, 96
- Position: Defensive tackle

Personal information
- Born: December 19, 1958 (age 67); New York, New York, U.S.
- Listed height: 6 ft 2 in (1.88 m)
- Listed weight: 265 lb (120 kg)

Career information
- High school: Curtis (Staten Island, New York)
- College: Rutgers
- NFL draft: 1980: undrafted

Career history
- Kansas City Chiefs (1980–1983); Seattle Seahawks (1984); San Francisco 49ers (1986)*; New England Patriots (1987)
- * Offseason or practice squad member only

Awards and highlights
- Third-team All-American (1979); First-team All-East (1979)

Career NFL statistics
- Sacks: 10.5
- Fumble recoveries: 2
- Interceptions: 1
- Stats at Pro Football Reference

Dino Mangiero (born December 19, 1958) is an American former professional football player who was a defensive lineman for six seasons in the National Football League (NFL) with the Kansas City Chiefs, Seattle Seahawks, and New England Patriots. He played college football for the Rutgers Scarlet Knights.

== See also ==
- Staten Island Sports Hall of Fame
- List of people from Staten Island § Sports
