= 1979 All-East football team =

American college football all-star team

The 1979 All-East football team consists of American football players chosen by the Associated Press as the best players at each position among the Eastern colleges and universities during the 1979 NCAA Division I-A football season.

The 1979 Pittsburgh Panthers football team was the only Eastern team to finish in the top ten, ranking No. 6 in the final UPI poll and No. 7 in the final AP poll. Pitt placed five players on the All-Eastern first team: defensive end Hugh Green, offensive tackle Mark May, tight end Benjie Pryor, and defensive backs JoJo Heath and Terry White.

Three of the players who won first-team honors on the All-East team also received first-team honors on the 1979 All-America college football team: wide receiver Art Monk of Syracuse; defensive end Hugh Green of Pitt; and defensive tackle Bruce Clark of Penn State.

== Offense ==
=== Quarterback ===
- Bill Hurley, Syracuse (AP-1)
- Brian Broomell, Temple (AP-2)

=== Running backs ===
- Joe Morris, Syracuse (AP-1)
- Matt Suhey, Penn State (AP-1)
- Mark Bright, Temple (AP-2)
- Angelo Colosimo, Colgate (AP-2)

=== Tight end ===
- Benjie Pryor, Pitt (AP-1)
- Paul Columbia, Villanova (AP-2)

=== Wide receivers ===
- Gerald Lucear, Temple (AP-1)
- Art Monk, Syracuse (AP-1)
- Rich Horner, Harvard (AP-2)
- Darrell Miller, West Virginia (AP-2)

=== Tackles ===
- Mark May, Pitt (AP-1)
- Irv Pankey, Penn State (AP-1)
- Kevin Kurdyla, Rutgers (AP-2)
- John Sinnott, Brown (AP-2)

=== Guards ===
- Frank McCallister, Navy (AP-1)
- Craig Wolfley, Syracuse (AP-1)
- Tom Donnelly, Cornell (AP-2)
- Dan Fidler, Pitt (AP-2)

=== Center ===
- Bill Chaplick, Boston College (AP-1)
- Pat Conochan, West Virginia (AP-2)

== Defense ==
=== Ends ===
- Hugh Green, Pitt (AP-1)
- Charlie Thornton, Navy (AP-1)
- Rickey Jackson, Pitt (AP-2)
- Larry Kubin, Penn State (AP-2)

=== Tackles ===
- Bruce Clark, Penn State (AP-1)
- Dino Mangiero, Rutgers (AP-1)
- Dave Conrad, Yale (AP-2)
- Matt Millen, Penn State (AP-2)

=== Middle guard ===
- George Mayes, Army (AP-1)
- Jerry Boyarsky, Pitt (AP-2)

=== Linebackers ===
- Jim Collins, Syracuse (AP-1)
- Lance Mehl, Penn State (AP-1)
- Tim Tumpane, Yale (AP-1)
- Mike Curcio, Temple (AP-2)
- Jeff Dziama, Boston College (AP-2)
- Joe Murphy, Colgate (AP-2)

=== Defensive backs ===
- Jo Jo Heath, Pitt (AP-1)
- Bernie Hober, Villanova (AP-1)
- Terry White, Pitt (AP-1)
- Deron Cherry, Rutgers (AP-2)
- Jerry Holmes, West Virginia (AP-2)
- Glenn Verrette, Holy Cross (AP-2)

== Key ==
- AP = Associated Press

== See also ==
- 1979 College Football All-America Team
