= Art Monk =

American football player (born 1957)

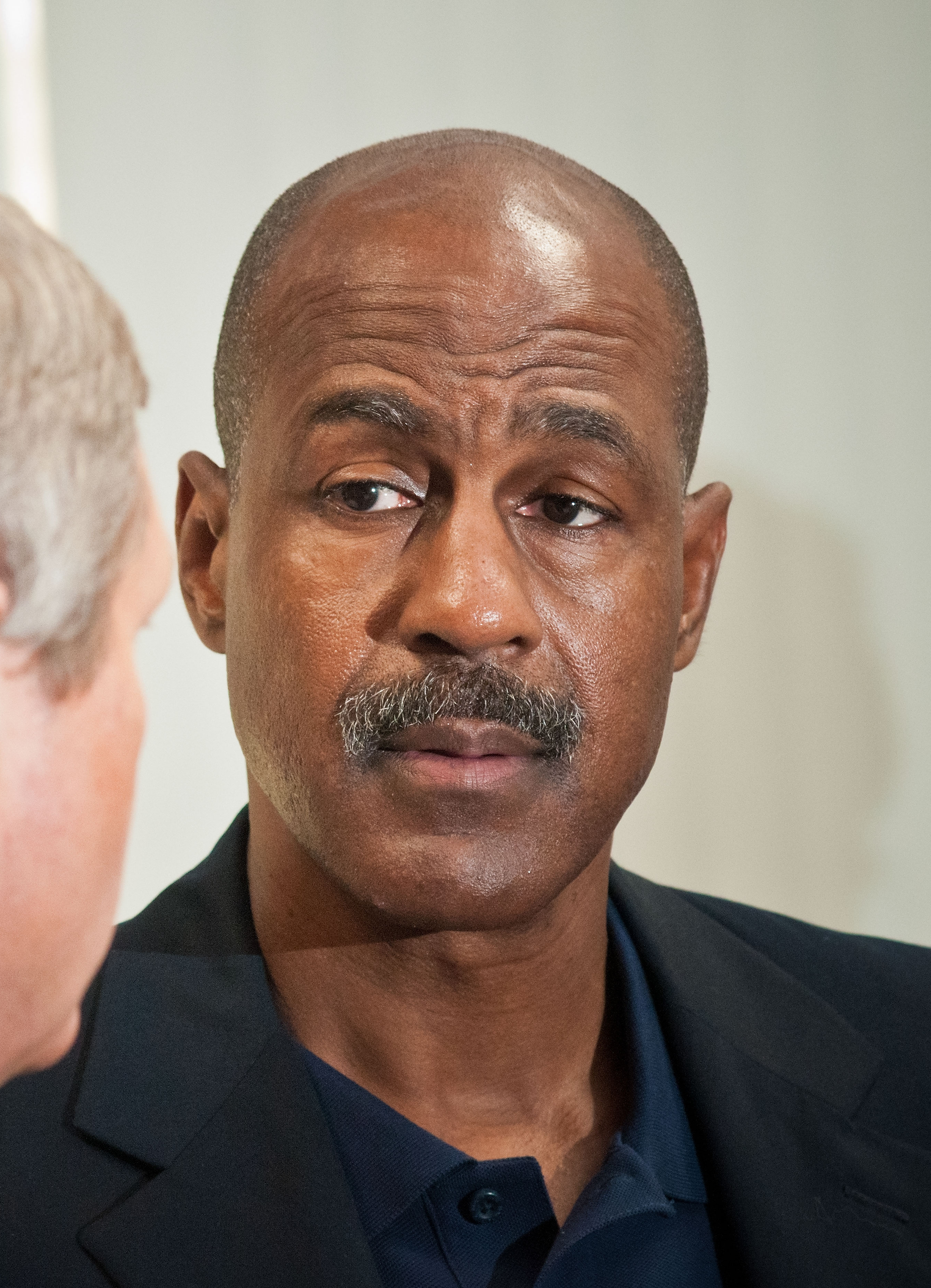
- Monk at the USDA 150th Anniversary celebration in 2012

No. 81, 85
- Position: Wide receiver

Personal information
- Born: December 5, 1957 (age 68); White Plains, New York, U.S.
- Listed height: 6 ft 3 in (1.91 m)
- Listed weight: 210 lb (95 kg)

Career information
- High school: White Plains
- College: Syracuse (1976–1979)
- NFL draft: 1980: 1st round, 18th overall pick

Career history
- Washington Redskins (1980–1993); New York Jets (1994); Philadelphia Eagles (1995)

Awards and highlights
- 3× Super Bowl champion (XVII, XXII, XXVI); 2× First-team All-Pro (1984, 1985); 3× Pro Bowl (1984–1986); NFL receptions leader (1984); NFL 1980s All-Decade Team; PFWA All-Rookie Team (1980); Washington Commanders No. 81 retired; Washington Commanders 90 Greatest; Washington Commanders Ring of Fame; First-team All-American (1979); First-team All-East (1979)

Career NFL statistics
- Receptions: 940
- Receiving yards: 12,721
- Receiving touchdowns: 68
- Stats at Pro Football Reference
- Pro Football Hall of Fame
- College Football Hall of Fame

James Arthur Monk (born December 5, 1957) is an American former professional football player who was a wide receiver in the National Football League (NFL) for the Washington Redskins, the New York Jets and the Philadelphia Eagles. He is considered by many NFL players, coaches, and analysts to be one of the greatest wide receivers of all time. Monk was inducted into the Pro Football Hall of Fame in 2008.

== Early life ==
James Arthur Monk was born on December 5, 1957, in White Plains, New York. He attended White Plains High School.

== College career ==
Monk attended and played college football at Syracuse University, where he was a four-year Orangemen letterman (1976–79). He led the team in receiving in 1977, 1978, and 1979 and still ranks in the top 10 on several school career record lists, including career receptions (sixth), all-time receiving yards (seventh), and receiving yards per game (ninth). While there, Monk was a graduate of the College of Visual and Performing Arts.

== Professional career ==
Monk was selected 18th overall in the first round of the 1980 NFL draft by the Washington Redskins. During his rookie year, he was a unanimous All-Rookie selection and had 58 receptions, which was a Redskin rookie record.

In 1984, Monk caught a then-NFL record 106 receptions for a career-best 1,372 yards. He caught eight or more passes in six games, had five games of 100 yards or more, and in a game against the San Francisco 49ers caught ten passes for 200 yards. That season, he earned team MVP honors and his first Pro Bowl selection. Monk went over the 1,000-yard mark in each of the following two seasons, becoming the first Redskins receiver to produce three consecutive 1,000-yard seasons. He also became the first Redskins player to catch 70 or more passes in three consecutive seasons. In 1989, he was part of a prolific wide receiver trio (along with Gary Clark and Ricky Sanders) nicknamed "The Posse," who became the first trio of wide receivers in NFL history to post 1,000-plus yards in the same season.

During Monk's 14 seasons with the Redskins, the team won three Super Bowls (XVII, XXII, and XXVI) and had only three losing seasons. He was an All-Pro and All-NFC choice in 1984 and 1985 and was named second-team All-NFC in 1986. He was also selected to play in the Pro Bowl following the 1984, 1985 and 1986 seasons.

Nine times during his 15-season career with the Redskins, New York Jets, and Philadelphia Eagles, Monk exceeded 50 catches in a season and five times gained more than 1,000 receiving yards. His record for most receptions in a season (106 in 1984) stood until broken by Sterling Sharpe's 108 in 1992. He also set the record for career receptions when he caught his 820th in a Monday Night game against Denver on October 12, 1992. He became the first player to eclipse 900 receptions, and pushed the record up to 940 before being overtaken by Jerry Rice in the final week of his last season (1995). With the retirement of James Lofton in 1993, he was the NFL's active leader in career yards for just two weeks in 1994 before being passed by Jerry Rice. He retired with the most consecutive games with a catch (183). He was named to the NFL 1980s All-Decade Team. Monk also became the first player in the league to record a touchdown reception in 15 consecutive seasons, as well as the first player ever to record at least 35 receptions in 15 consecutive seasons. Through the course of his 14 years with the Redskins, Monk converted nearly two-thirds of his 888 catches into first downs.

On August 2, 2008, Monk, along with fellow Washington Redskins teammate Darrell Green, was inducted into the Pro Football Hall of Fame. Upon his induction into the Hall of Fame, Monk received the longest standing ovation in Pro Football Hall of Fame history, lasting four minutes and four seconds when later timed by NFL Films. In 2012, Monk was inducted into the College Football Hall of Fame.

On July 15, 2025, the Washington Commanders announced they would retire Monk's No. 81 jersey in the 2025 season. This would make him the sixth player in franchise history to receive the honor, joining Sammy Baugh, Bobby Mitchell, Sonny Jurgensen, Sean Taylor, and Darrell Green.

== Career statistics ==
=== NFL ===
Legend
	Won the Super Bowl
	Led the league
**Bold**	Career high

==== Regular season ====
Year	Team	Games		Receiving				
Year	Team	GP	GS	Rec	Yds	Avg	Lng	TD
1980	WAS	**16**	11	58	797	13.7	54	3
1981	WAS	**16**	**16**	56	894	16.0	**79**	6
1982	WAS	9	9	35	447	12.8	43	1
1983	WAS	12	11	47	746	15.9	43	5
1984	WAS	**16**	**16**	**106**	**1,372**	12.9	72	7
1985	WAS	15	14	91	1,226	13.5	53	2
1986	WAS	**16**	**16**	73	1,068	14.6	69	4
1987	WAS	9	9	38	483	12.7	62	6
1988	WAS	**16**	13	72	946	13.1	46	5
1989	WAS	**16**	12	86	1,186	13.8	60	**8**
1990	WAS	**16**	**16**	68	770	11.3	44	5
1991	WAS	**16**	**16**	71	1,049	14.8	64	**8**
1992	WAS	**16**	14	46	644	14.0	49	3
1993	WAS	**16**	5	41	398	9.7	29	2
1994	NYJ	**16**	15	46	581	12.6	69	3
1995	PHI	3	1	6	114	**19.0**	36	0
Career		224	194	940	12,721	13.5	79	68

==== Postseason ====
Year	Team	Games		Receiving				
Year	Team	GP	GS	Rec	Yds	Avg	Lng	TD
1983	WAS	**3**	**3**	8	121	15.1	40	**2**
1984	WAS	1	1	10	122	12.2	35	0
1986	WAS	**3**	**3**	**18**	241	13.4	**48**	**2**
1987	WAS	1	0	1	40	**40.0**	40	0
1990	WAS	2	2	12	207	17.3	40	**2**
1991	WAS	**3**	**3**	15	**252**	16.8	45	1
1992	WAS	2	2	5	79	15.8	37	0
Career		15	14	69	1,062	15.4	48	7

=== College ===
Legend
	NCAA record
	Led the NCAA
	Independent record
	Led Independents
**Bold**	Career high

College receiving & rushing statistics*
Season	Team	GP	Receiving				Rushing			
Season	Team	GP	Rec	Yds	Avg	TD	Att	Yds	Avg	TD
1976	Syracuse	**11**	2	45	**22.5**	0	0	0	0.0	0
1977	Syracuse	**11**	**41**	590	14.4	**4**	110	566	**5.1**	**2**
1978	Syracuse	**11**	19	293	15.4	2	**136**	**573**	4.2	**2**
1979	Syracuse	**11**	40	**716**	17.9	3	8	35	4.4	0
Career		44	102	1,644	16.1	9	254	1,174	4.6	4

* Includes bowl games.

== Career highlights ==
=== Awards and honors ===
NFL

- 3× Super Bowl champion (XVII, XXII, XXVI)
- 2× First-team All-Pro (1984, 1985)
- 3× Pro Bowl (1984–1986)
- NFL receptions leader (1984)
- NFL 1980s All-Decade Team
- PFWA All-Rookie Team (1980)
- Washington Commanders 90 Greatest
- Washington Commanders Ring of Fame
- Washington Commanders No. 81 retired
- Pro Football Hall of Fame (2008)

College

- First-team All-American (1979)
- First-team All-East (1979)
- College Football Hall of Fame (2012)

Other honors

- Elected to Syracuse University Board of Trustees
- 2015 - WPHS Sports Hall of Fame Inductee

=== Records ===
==== NFL records ====
- First player to record a touchdown reception in 15 consecutive seasons (1980–1994)
- Consecutive seasons with at least 35 receptions (15, 1980–1994)
- First player to record over 102+ receptions (106 in 1984 season) in a season before NFL rules changes prior to the 1990 season that ushered in the "pass happy era". Still, only three players in the next nine years collected 100 passes or more and only one (Sterling Sharpe in 1992 season) surpassed his total.
- First player to record over 100+ receptions in the Super Bowl era
- First player to record back to back seasons with 1,200 yards and 90 receptions (1984, 1985)
- First player to reach 820 receptions in a career
- First player to surpass 900 career receptions, finishing career with 940 (all-time record at the time)
- First player to record at least one reception in 180 consecutive games

==== Redskins records ====
- Yards from scrimmage (13,053)
- Receiving yards (12,026)
- Receptions (888)
- Consecutive games with at least one reception (164) These are his consecutive games with a catch as a Redskin, not for his career. Monk continued his streak after moving on from the team.

== Personal life ==
Monk is a relative (first cousin once removed) of jazz pioneer Thelonious Monk.

=== Business ===
Monk is executive and co-founder of Alliant Merchant Services, an electronic payment services company located in Northern Virginia.

=== Community service ===
A devout Christian, Monk helped found the Good Samaritan Foundation with his Washington teammates Charles Mann, Tim Johnson and Earnest Byner. The foundation provides youth with the environment needed to equip them with the skills, training and resources necessary to compete successfully in society through the Student Training Opportunity Program (STOP). The program serves more than 50 high school students four days a week during the school year and five days a week during the summer providing after-school programs, tutoring and mentoring.

Founded in 1983, the Art Monk Football Camp has graduated over 14,000 athletes.
