= 1983 Washington Redskins season =

NFL team season (lost Super Bowl)

- Owner: Jack Kent Cooke
- General manager: Bobby Beathard
- President: Edward Bennett Williams
- Head coach: Joe Gibbs
- Offensive coordinator: Joe Bugel
- Defensive coordinator: Richie Petitbon
- Home stadium: RFK Stadium

Results
- Record: 14–2
- Division place: 1st NFC East
- Playoffs: Won Divisional Playoffs (vs. Rams) 51–7; Won NFC Championship (vs. 49ers) 24–21; Lost Super Bowl XVIII (vs. Raiders) 9–38
- All-Pros: 7: QB Joe Theismann (1st team); RB John Riggins (1st team); LT Joe Jacoby (1st team); LG Russ Grimm (1st team); KR Mike Nelms (1st team); DT Dave Butz (1st team); FS Mark Murphy (1st team)
- Pro Bowlers: 7: WR Charlie Brown; C Jeff Bostic; DT Dave Butz; LG Russ Grimm; FS Mark Murphy; LT Joe Jacoby; QB Joe Theismann

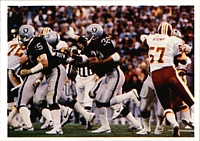
The Redskins playing against the Raiders in Super Bowl XVIII.

The 1983 Washington Redskins season was the franchise's 52nd season in the National Football League (NFL) and their 47th in Washington, D.C. The season began with the team trying to win consecutive Super Bowls, following their victory in Super Bowl XVII against the Miami Dolphins. Washington's 14–2 record was a franchise record and the best in the NFL. Their two losses were by a combined 2 points. Though the Redskins won the NFC Championship and advanced to a second consecutive Super Bowl, they were blown out by the Los Angeles Raiders 38–9 despite being 3-point favorites. They were the first defending Super Bowl champions to qualify for the playoffs since the 1979 Pittsburgh Steelers.

The Redskins' 541 points scored and +209 point differential was the best in the league, with the 541 points setting an NFL record at the time. The 1983 Redskins also had a turnover margin of +43, an NFL record. Washington was the first team since the merger to record more than 60 takeaways (61).

This season was cornerback Darrell Green's first in the league. He would spend 20 seasons with the team until his retirement in 2002.

The 27–12 victory on September 18 against the Kansas City Chiefs is the only win in franchise history against them as of 2024.

== Personnel ==
=== Coaches / Staff ===
1983 Washington Redskins staff
Front office: Owner / Team President – Jack Kent Cooke; Executive Vice President - John Kent Cooke; General manager – Bobby Beathard; Senior Vice President - Gerard T. Gabrys; Director of Player Personnel - Mike Allman; Head coaches: Head coach – Joe Gibbs; Offensive coaches: Quarterbacks Coach - Jerry Rhome; Offensive Backfield / Running backs – Don Breaux; Tight Ends / Offensive Scouting Reports - Warren Simmons; Offensive line / Offensive Coordinator – Joe Bugel	Defensive coaches: Defensive coordinator – Richie Petitbon; Defensive Line Coach - LaVern Torgeson; Linebackers Coach / Assistant Defensive Coordinator – Larry Peccatiello; Defensive Assistant / Player Personnel Intern; Special teams coaches: Special teams coordinator – Wayne Sevier; Strength and conditioning: Head athletic trainer – Bubba Tyer; Head strength and conditioning – Dan Riley

=== Final roster ===
1983 Washington Redskins roster
Quarterbacks (QB): 8 Bob Holly; 12 Babe Laufenberg; 7 Joe Theismann; Running backs (RB): 26 Reggie Evans; 30 Nick Giaquinto; 44 John Riggins; 25 Joe Washington; 39 Otis Wonsley; Wide receivers (WR): 87 Charlie Brown; 89 Alvin Garrett; 83 Mark McGrath; 81 Art Monk; 80 Virgil Seay; Tight ends (TE): 86 Clint Didier; 88 Rick Walker; 85 Don Warren; 84 Mike Williams	Offensive linemen (OL): 53 Jeff Bostic C; 68 Russ Grimm G; 61 Ken Huff G; 66 Joe Jacoby T; 67 Bruce Kimball G; 73 Mark May G; 60 Roy Simmons G/T; 74 George Starke T; Defensive linemen (DL): 69 Perry Brooks DT; 65 Dave Butz DT; 77 Darryl Grant DT; 79 Todd Liebenstein DE; 72 Dexter Manley DE; 71 Charles Mann DE; 78 Tony McGee DE	Linebackers (LB): 58 Stuart Anderson OLB; 51 Monte Coleman OLB; 54 Peter Cronan MLB; 55 Mel Kaufman OLB; 50 Larry Kubin OLB; 57 Rich Milot OLB; 52 Neal Olkewicz MLB; Defensive backs (DB): 41 Brian Carpenter CB; 48 Ken Coffey SS; 32 Vernon Dean CB; 28 Darrell Green CB; 22 Curtis Jordan SS; 29 Mark Murphy FS; 24 Anthony Washington CB; 47 Greg Williams FS; Special teams (ST): 5 Jeff Hayes P; 3 Mark Moseley K	Reserve: 59 Geff Gandy LB (IR); 62 Donald Laster T (IR); 76 Mat Mendenhall DE (Left squad); 21 Mike Nelms RS (IR); 23 Tony Peters S (Susp.); -- Bruce Radford DE (IR); 40 Vic Vines S (IR); 63 Bob Winckler T (IR); Rookies in italics

== Schedule ==
Week	Date	Opponent	Result	Record	Venue	Attendance	Game recap
1	September 5	**Dallas Cowboys**	**L** 30–31	0–1	RFK Stadium	55,045	Recap
2	September 11	at **Philadelphia Eagles**	**W** 23–13	1–1	Veterans Stadium	69,542	Recap
3	September 18	Kansas City Chiefs	**W** 27–12	2–1	RFK Stadium	52,610	Recap
4	September 25	at Seattle Seahawks	**W** 27–17	3–1	Kingdome	60,718	Recap
5	October 2	Los Angeles Raiders	**W** 37–35	4–1	RFK Stadium	54,106	Recap
6	October 9	at **St. Louis Cardinals**	**W** 38–14	5–1	Busch Memorial Stadium	42,698	Recap
7	October 17	at Green Bay Packers	**L** 47–48	5–2	Lambeau Field	55,255	Recap
8	October 23	Detroit Lions	**W** 38–17	6–2	RFK Stadium	43,189	Recap
9	October 31	at San Diego Chargers	**W** 27–24	7–2	Jack Murphy Stadium	46,114	Recap
10	November 6	**St. Louis Cardinals**	**W** 45–7	8–2	RFK Stadium	51,380	Recap
11	November 13	at **New York Giants**	**W** 33–17	9–2	Giants Stadium	71,482	Recap
12	November 20	at Los Angeles Rams	**W** 42–20	10–2	Anaheim Stadium	63,031	Recap
13	November 27	**Philadelphia Eagles**	**W** 28–24	11–2	RFK Stadium	54,324	Recap
14	December 4	Atlanta Falcons	**W** 37–21	12–2	RFK Stadium	52,074	Recap
15	December 11	at **Dallas Cowboys**	**W** 31–10	13–2	Texas Stadium	65,074	Recap
16	December 17	**New York Giants**	**W** 31–22	14–2	RFK Stadium	53,874	Recap

Note: Intra-division opponents are in bold text.

=== Game summaries ===
==== Week 1: vs. Dallas Cowboys ====
Quarter	1	2	3	4	Total
**Cowboys (1–0)**	0	3	14	14	**31**
Redskins (0–1)	10	13	0	7	**30**

at Robert F. Kennedy Memorial Stadium

- Date: Monday, September 5
- Game time: 9:00 p.m.(et)
- Game weather: 84 °F (29 °C), relative humidity 66, round(wind) 6.5 mph (10.5 km/h)
- Referee: Gene Barth
- TV announcers (ABC): Frank Gifford, Howard Cosell and Don Meredith
- Pro-Football-Reference.com

Game information

**First quarter**

- Redskins - Mark Moseley 23 yard field goal - **Redskins 3–0**
- Redskins - John Riggins 1 yard rush (Mark Moseley kick) - **Redskins 10–0**

**Second quarter**

- Cowboys - Rafael Septién 26 yard field goal - **Redskins 10–3**
- Redskins - Mark Moseley 30 yard field goal - **Redskins 13–3**
- Redskins - Mark Moseley 39 yard field goal - **Redskins 16–3**
- Redskins - Charlie Brown 41 yard pass from Joe Theismann (Mark Moseley kick) - **Redskins 23–3**

**Third quarter**

- Cowboys - Tony Hill 75 yard pass from Danny White (Rafael Septién kick) - **Redskins 23–10**
- Cowboys - Tony Hill 51 yard pass from Danny White (Rafael Septién kick) - **Redskins 23–17**

**Fourth quarter**

- Cowboys - Danny White 1 yard rush (Rafael Septién kick) - **Cowboys 24–23**
- Cowboys - Doug Cosbie 1 yard pass from Danny White (Rafael Septién kick) - **Cowboys 31–23**
- Redskins - Don Warren 1 yard pass from Joe Theismann (Mark Moseley kick) - **Cowboys 31–30**

**Passing**

- Cowboys – Danny White – 9/20, 193 Yds, 3 TD, 0 Int, 75 Lng
- Redskins – Joe Theismann – 28/38, 325 Yds, 2 TD, 1 Int, 41 Lng

**Rushing**

- Cowboys – Tony Dorsett – 14 att/151 yds, 0 TD, 77 Lng
- Cowboys – Ron Springs – 9 att/32 yds, 0 TD, 8 Lng
- Redskins – John Riggins – 27 att/89 yds, 1 TD, 18 Lng
- Redskins – Joe Washington – 5 att/9 yds, 0 TD, 5 Lng

**Receiving**

- Cowboys – Tony Hill – 3 Rec, 133 yds, 2 TD, 75 Lng
- Cowboys – Doug Cosbie – 3 Rec, 36 yds, 1 TD, 18 Lng
- Cowboys – Ron Springs – 2 Rec, 17 yds, 0 TD, 10 Lng
- Cowboys – Drew Pearson – 1 Rec, 7 yds, 0 TD, 7 Lng
- Redskins – Alvin Garret – 10 Rec, 101 yds, 0 TD, 21 Lng
- Redskins – Charlie Brown – 6 Rec, 97 yds, 1 TD, 41 Lng
- Redskins – Rick Walker – 4 Rec, 45 yds, 0 TD, 21 Lng
- Redskins – Don Warren – 2 Rec, 9 yds, 1 TD, 8 Lng
- Redskins – Joe Washington – 2 Rec, 28 yds, 0 TD, 15 Lng

**Vegas Spread**

- Vegas Line= Dal -1.5
- Over/Under= 41 **(Over)**

==== Week 2: at Philadelphia Eagles ====
Quarter	1	2	3	4	Total
**Redskins (1–1)**	7	0	3	13	**23**
Eagles (1–1)	0	3	7	3	**13**

at Veterans Stadium

- Date: Sunday, September 11, 1983
- Game time: 1:00pm(ET)
- Game weather: 83 °F (28 °C), relative humidity 57%, wind 10 mph (16 km/h)
- Referee: Chuck Heberling
- Pro-Football-Reference.com

==== Week 3: vs. Kansas City Chiefs ====
Quarter	1	2	3	4	Total
Chiefs (1–2)	3	9	0	0	**12**
**Redskins (2–1)**	0	0	17	10	**27**

at Robert F. Kennedy Memorial Stadium

- Date: Sunday, September 18, 1983
- Game time: 1:00pm(ET)
- Game weather: 72 °F (22 °C), relative humidity 58%, wind 6 mph (9.7 km/h)
- Referee: Bob Frederic
- TV announcers (NBC): Charlie Jones and Bob Griese
- Pro-Football-Reference.com

To date, this marks the only time that Washington has defeated Kansas City.

==== Week 4: at Seattle Seahawks ====
Quarter	1	2	3	4	Total
**Redskins (3–1)**	7	13	0	7	**27**
Seahawks (2–2)	3	7	0	7	**17**

at Seattle Kingdome

- Date: Sunday, September 25, 1983
- Game time: 4:00pm(ET)
- Game weather: 72 °F (22 °C)
- Referee: Fred Wyant
- TV announcers (CBS): Jack Buck and Hank Stram
- Pro-Football-Reference.com

==== Week 5: vs. Los Angeles Raiders ====
Team	1	2	3	4	Total
Raiders (4–1)	0	7	14	14	35
• **Redskins (4–1)**	7	10	3	17	37

- Date: October 2
- Location: RFK Stadium • Washington, D.C.
- Game start: 1:00 p.m. EST
- Game attendance: 54,106
- Game weather: 65 °F (18 °C) • Wind 4 mph (6.4 km/h)
- Referee: Pat Haggerty
- TV announcers (NBC): Marv Albert and John Brodie

Scoring summary
1	WSH	John Riggins 2 yard run (Mark Moseley kick)	Redskins 7–0
2	WSH	Mark Moseley 28 yard field goal	Redskins 10–0
2	LA	Cliff Branch 99 yard pass from Jim Plunkett (Chris Bahr kick)	Redskins 10–7
2	WSH	Joe Washington 5 yard pass from Joe Theismann (Mark Moseley kick)	Redskins 17–7
3	WSH	Mark Moseley 29 yard field goal	Redskins 20–7
3	LA	Calvin Muhammad 35 yard pass from Jim Plunkett (Chris Bahr kick)	Redskins 20–14
3	LA	Calvin Muhammad 22 yard pass from Jim Plunkett (Chris Bahr kick)	Raiders 21–20
4	LA	Todd Christensen 2 yard pass from Jim Plunkett (Chris Bahr kick)	Raiders 28–20
4	LA	Greg Pruitt 97 yard punt return (Chris Bahr kick)	Raiders 35–20
4	WSH	Charlie Brown 11 yard pass from Joe Theismann (Mark Moseley kick)	Raiders 35–27
4	WSH	Mark Moseley 34 yard field goal	Raiders 35–30
4	WSH	Joe Washington 6 yard pass from Joe Theismann (Mark Moseley kick)	Redskins 37–35

==== Week 6: at St. Louis Cardinals ====
Quarter	1	2	3	4	Total
**Redskins (5–1)**	7	17	14	0	**38**
Cardinals (1–5)	0	7	7	0	**14**

at Busch Stadium

- Date: Sunday, October 9, 1983
- Game time: 1:00pm(ET)
- Game weather: 56 °F (13 °C), relative humidity 76%, wind 10 mph (16 km/h)
- Referee: Red Cashion
- TV announcers (CBS): Jack Buck and Hank Stram
- Pro-Football-Reference.com

==== Week 7: at Green Bay Packers ====
Quarter	1	2	3	4	Total
Redskins (5–2)	10	10	13	14	**47**
**Packers (4–3)**	10	14	7	17	**48**

at Lambeau Field

- Date: Monday, October 17, 1983
- Game time: 9:00pm(ET)
- Game weather: 47 °F (8 °C), relative humidity 67%, wind 10.5 mph (16.9 km/h)
- Referee: Ben Dreith
- TV announcers (ABC): Frank Gifford, Don Meredith and O. J. Simpson
- Pro-Football-Reference.com

Game information

**First quarter**

- Packers - Mike Douglass 22 yard fumble return (Jan Stenerud kick) - **WAS 0, GNB 7**
- Redskins - Clint Didier 0 yard fumble return (Mark Moseley kick) - **WAS 7, GNB 7**
- Packers - Jan Stenerud 47 yard field goal - **WAS 7, GNB 10**
- Redskins - Mark Moseley 42 yard field goal - **WAS 10, GNB 10**

**Second quarter**

- Packers - Paul Coffman 36 yard pass from Lynn Dickey (Jan Stenerud kick) - **WAS 10, GNB 17**
- Redskins -John Riggins 1 yard rush (Mark Moseley kick) - **WAS 17, GNB 17**
- Packers - Paul Coffman 9 yard pass from Lynn Dickey (Jan Stenerud kick) - **WAS 17, GNB 24**
- Redskins - Mark Moseley 28 yard field goal - **WAS 20, GNB 24**

**Third quarter**

- Packers - Gerry Ellis 24 yard rush (Jan Stenerud kick) - **WAS 20, GNB 31**
- Redskins - Mark Moseley 31 yard field goal - **WAS 23, GNB 31**
- Redskins -Joe Washington 6 yard pass from Joe Theismann (Mark Moseley kick) - **WAS 30, GNB 31**
- Redskins - Mark Moseley 28 yard field goal - **WAS 33, GNB 31**

**Fourth quarter**

- Packers - Gary Lewis 2 yard rush (Jan Stenerud kick) - **WAS 33, GNB 38**
- Redskins - John Riggins 1 yard rush (Mark Moseley kick) - **WAS 40, GNB 38**
- Packers - Mike Meade 31 yard pass from Lynn Dickey (Jan Stenerud kick) - **WAS 40, GNB 45**
- Redskins - Joe Washington 5 yard pass from Joe Theismann (Mark Moseley kick) - **WAS 47, GNB 45**
- Packers - Jan Stenerud 20 yard field goal - **WAS 47, GNB 48**

**Redskins**

- **Passing**
- Joe Theismann - 27/39, 398 Yds, 2 TD, 0 Int, 35 Lng
- **Rushing**
- John Riggins - 25 Att, 98 Yds, 2 TD, 36 Lng
- Joe Washington - 16 Att, 80 Yds, 0 TD, 19 Lng
- Joe Theismann - 1 Att, 14 Yds, 0 TD, 14 Lng
- **Receiving**
- Art Monk - 5 Rec, 105 Yds, 0 TD, 56 Lng
- Charlie Brown - 6 Rec, 91 Yds, 0 TD, 20 Lng
- Don Warren - 4 Rec, 70 Yds, 0 TD, 29 Lng
- Joe Washington - 9 Rec, 57 Yds, 2 TD, 13 Lng
- Nick Giaquinto - 2 Rec, 66 Yds, 0 TD, 35 Lng

**Packers**

- **Passing**
- Lynn Dickey - 22/31, 387 Yds, 3 TD, 1 Int, 56 Lng
- **Rushing**
- Gerry Ellis - 3 Att, 41 Yds, 1 TD, 24 Lng
- Mike Meade - 2 Att, 6 Yds, 0 TD, 9 Lng
- James Lofton - 1 Att, 6 Yds, 0 TD, 6 Lng
- **Receiving**
- James Lofton - 5 Rec, 96 Yds, 0 TD, 40 Lng
- John Jefferson - 4 Rec, 50 Yds, 0 TD, 19 Lng
- Paul Coffman - 6 Rec, 124 Yds, 2 TD, 36 Lng
- Gerry Ellis - 4 Rec, 105 Yds, 0 TD, 56 Lng
- Mike Meade - 2 Rec, 35 Yds, 1 TD, 31 Lng

**Vegas Spread**

- Vegas Line= Washington -3.0
- Over/Under= 52.0**(over)**

**Packers** Defeat Redskins in 48–47 Monday Night Thriller The Green Bay Packers were facing a major challenge as they hosted the Washington Redskins on October 17, 1983. At 3–3, Head Coach Bart Starr’s Packers were a team that could put points on the board, especially with QB Lynn Dickey (pictured above) passing to wide receivers James Lofton and John Jefferson and TE Paul Coffman. But they also gave up points and came into the game with the 28th-ranked defense in the NFL. They also had to make adjustments on the offensive line, with G Tim Huffman out with an ankle injury that necessitated moving Greg Koch over from his OT position and starting Charlie Getty at tackle.

Having a poor defense was not a good situation to be in when facing the Redskins. Coached by Joe Gibbs, they were coming off a Super Bowl-winning season and, if anything, were even stronger in ‘83. Behind the best offensive line in the league, QB Joe Theismann was a proficient passer and RB John Riggins a powerful force running the ball. If there was a weak point, it was the defensive backfield, but Washington was cruising at 5–1, with a close opening-game loss to the Cowboys the only blemish.

There were 55,255 fans in attendance for the Monday night game at Lambeau Field. Just over a minute into the first quarter, they had reason to get excited when Green Bay LB Mike Douglass forced RB Joe Washington to fumble and returned it 22 yards for a touchdown and, with Jan Stenerud’s extra point added, the early 7–0 lead.

DB Mike Nelms returned the kickoff 41 yards and the Redskins drove 55 yards in six plays, highlighted by Theismann’s pass to WR Art Monk for a 34-yard gain. The series ended with John Riggins fumbling into the end zone and TE Clint Didier recovering for a TD. Mark Moseley tied the score with his PAT.

Green Bay responded with a 10-play, 40-yard drive. Lynn Dickey threw to Paul Coffman for 17 yards and John Jefferson for 13 along the way and Stenerud kicked a 47-yard field goal that put the Packers back in front by three.

Washington moved the ball quickly downfield with Theismann connecting with Monk for a 22-yard gain and with RB Nick Giaquinto for 31 more yards. But the Green Bay defense came through with back-to-back sacks of Theismann and the Redskins had to settle for a 42-yard Moseley field goal. The eventful first quarter ended with the score tied at 10–10.

Things did not slow down as the game approached the second quarter. Dickey threw to James Lofton for 21 yards and the Packers picked up 15 more on a penalty when CB Darrell Green hit the receiver out of bounds. Dickey then tossed a 36-yard touchdown pass to Coffman. Stenerud added the extra point and the home team was back in front by 17–10.

Back came the Redskins, moving 67 yards in seven plays and highlighted by a 36-yard carry by Riggins. Riggins scored from a yard out and Moseley again knotted the score with the successful PAT.

The Packers reached the Washington 33 on the next series before a Dickey pass was intercepted by CB Anthony Washington. After getting a first down, the Redskins were finally forced to punt and Green Bay came back with a 73-yard, seven-play possession. RB Eddie Lee Ivery tossed an option pass to Coffman for 15 yards and a first down at the Washington 9 from where Coffman caught a scoring pass, this time from Dickey. Stenerud added the extra point and once again the Packers were in front by a touchdown.

With less than two minutes remaining in the half, the Redskins came out throwing. Theismann completed five passes to reach the Green Bay 11 and Moseley booted a 28-yard field goal as the clock reached five seconds. The Packers carried a 24–20 lead into the intermission.

Starting off the third quarter, the Packers struck quickly as they advanced 80 yards in just 42 seconds. Dickey threw to Coffman for 40 yards and then RB Gerry Ellis, taking advantage of a big hole, ran 24 yards for a touchdown. The home team had its biggest lead of the day at 31-20.

Washington seemed on the verge of responding with a touchdown, reaching the Green Bay four, but an offensive pass interference penalty nullified an apparent scoring catch and once again the Redskins settled for a Moseley field goal, this time from 31 yards.

Starting off the third quarter, the Packers struck quickly as they advanced 80 yards in just 42 seconds. Dickey threw to Coffman for 40 yards and then RB Gerry Ellis, taking advantage of a big hole, ran 24 yards for a touchdown. The home team had its biggest lead of the day at 31-20.

Washington seemed on the verge of responding with a touchdown, reaching the Green Bay four, but an offensive pass interference penalty nullified an apparent scoring catch and once again the Redskins settled for a Moseley field goal, this time from 31 yards.

Up by eight points, the Packers were forced to punt on their next series and Bucky Scribner’s kick was blocked to give the Redskins the ball at the Green Bay 19. Five plays later, Theismann threw to Joe Washington for a six-yard TD and, with Moseley’s PAT, the Green Bay lead was down to 31–30.

Washington’s defense again asserted itself as Dickey was sacked twice by DT Dave Butz. Nelms made a good return of the ensuing punt by Scribner to give the visitors possession at their 46. From there, the Redskins again moved deep into Green Bay territory, but after reaching the nine yard line, Douglass tackled Joe Washington for a loss and once again Washington was held to a field goal. Still, Moseley connected from 28 yards and put the visitors ahead by 33–31 with ten seconds left in the period.

RB Harlan Huckleby returned the ensuing kickoff for 54 yards to the Washington 39 and the fourth quarter started with Dickey throwing to Ellis for 32 yards. Shortly thereafter, TE Gary Lewis scored a touchdown from two yards out on an end-around that put the Packers back in front.

The Redskins came right back again as Theismann threw to Monk for 25 yards and WR Charlie Brown for another 15. Riggins blasted into the end zone from a yard out and Washington was again in the lead of the wildly back-and-forth contest.

The Packers responded with another score of their own, with Dickey completing passes covering 19 yards to Jefferson and 17 yards to Lofton. An 11-yard touchdown pass to FB Mike Meade, followed by Stenerud’s extra point, again put Green Bay in front at 45–40.

Now it was Washington’s turn again. Theismann (pictured at right) threw to Monk for 21 yards and Joe Washington ran for two first downs. A sack of Theismann by DE Byron Braggs momentarily derailed the Redskins, but a pass to Giaquinto picked up 35 yards and set up a five-yard scoring toss to Washington. Moseley added the point and, with 2:50 left on the clock, the visitors were back on top at 47-45.

It looked bleak for the Packers when, following the kickoff, Dickey tossed two incomplete passes. But then he found Ellis on a short pass over the middle that turned into a 56-yard gain to the Washington eight and, after conservatively running the ball into the line three times, the dependable Stenerud came on to kick a 20-yard field goal. It was the fifth lead change of the final period and put the Packers ahead by a point.

There were still 54 seconds remaining in the contest, however, and while the Redskins had no timeouts remaining, they quickly moved the ball down the field. Theismann completed three passes to Joe Washington, gaining a total of 33 yards, and the running back made it out of bounds after each. Theismann then threw to Brown for 22 yards, but the clock was still running and the quarterback had to hurriedly toss a pass out of bounds with three seconds to go. On the last play of the game, Moseley missed a 39-yard field goal attempt, the fans erupted, and the Packers came away with the 48–47 win.

The combined 95 points was a new high for Monday Night Football until it was broken on November 19, 2018 when the Kansas City Chiefs and the Los Angeles Rams combined to score 105 points. The teams also combined for 1025 yards of offense, with the Redskins topping Green Bay by 552 to 473. They had more first downs (33 to 23). Each team turned the ball over once, and there were just three punts in all (one by Washington, two for Green Bay, one of which was blocked by the Redskins).

“It was about the wildest thing I’ve ever been in,” said Lynn Dickey. “I wish I had been in the stands or at home watching on tv, it was that good.”

“It was a tremendously inspirational win because you could see the sort of enthusiasm and intensity that was on display tonight,” said Bart Starr. “You have to salute both teams because Washington, for the reasons demonstrated on the field, is a world-championship team. They are magnificent.”

==== Week 8: vs. Detroit Lions ====
Quarter	1	2	3	4	Total
Lions (3–5)	0	3	7	7	**17**
**Redskins (6–2)**	14	14	3	7	**38**

at Robert F. Kennedy Memorial Stadium

- Date: Sunday, October 23, 1983
- Game time: 1:00pm(ET)
- Game weather: 56 °F (13 °C), relative humidity 85%, wind 8 mph (13 km/h)
- Referee: Jerry Markbreit
- TV announcers (CBS): Frank Glieber and Dick Vermeil
- Pro-Football-Reference.com

==== Week 9: at San Diego Chargers ====
Quarter	1	2	3	4	Total
**Redskins (7–2)**	7	3	7	10	**27**
Chargers (3–6)	7	0	0	17	**24**

at Jack Murphy Stadium

- Date: Monday, October 31, 1983
- Game time: 9:00pm(ET)
- Game weather: 71 °F (22 °C), relative humidity 73%, wind 9 mph (14 km/h)
- Referee: Fred Silva
- TV announcers (ABC): Frank Gifford, Don Meredith, Howard Cosell
- Pro-Football-Reference.com

==== Week 10: vs. St. Louis Cardinals ====
Quarter	1	2	3	4	Total
Cardinals (3–6–1)	0	0	7	0	**7**
**Redskins (8–2)**	7	10	21	7	**45**

at Robert F. Kennedy Memorial Stadium

- Date: Sunday, November 6, 1983
- Game time: 4:00pm(ET)
- Game weather: 43 °F (6 °C), relative humidity 72%, wind 10 mph (16 km/h)
- Referee: Gordon McCarter
- Pro-Football-Reference.com

==== Week 11: at New York Giants ====
Quarter	1	2	3	4	Total
**Redskins (9–2)**	13	3	10	7	**33**
Giants (2–8–1)	3	0	0	14	**17**

at The Meadowlands

- Date: Sunday, November 13, 1983
- Game time: 4:00pm(ET)
- Game weather: 37 °F (3 °C), relative humidity 55%, wind 19 mph (31 km/h), wind chill 27 °F (−3 °C)
- Referee: Chuck Heberling
- Pro-Football-Reference.com

==== Week 12: at Los Angeles Rams ====
Quarter	1	2	3	4	Total
**Redskins (10–2)**	10	19	10	3	**42**
Rams (7–5)	6	0	0	14	**20**

at Anaheim Stadium

- Date: Sunday, November 20, 1983
- Game time: 4:00pm(ET)
- Game weather: 59 °F (15 °C), relative humidity 68%, wind 15 mph (24 km/h)
- Referee: Fred Wyant
- TV announcers (CBS): Frank Glieber and Dick Vermeil
- Pro-Football-Reference.com

==== Week 13: vs. Philadelphia Eagles ====
Quarter	1	2	3	4	Total
Eagles (4–9)	0	21	3	0	**24**
**Redskins (11–2)**	7	21	0	0	**28**

at Robert F. Kennedy Memorial Stadium

- Date: Sunday, November 27, 1983
- Game time: 1:00pm(ET)
- Game weather: 50 °F (10 °C), relative humidity 59%, wind 5 mph (8.0 km/h)
- Referee: Jerry Seeman
- TV announcers (CBS): Jack Buck and Hank Stram
- Pro-Football-Reference.com

==== Week 14: vs. Atlanta Falcons ====
Quarter	1	2	3	4	Total
Falcons (6–8)	0	0	0	21	**21**
**Redskins (12–2)**	7	13	14	3	**37**

at Robert F. Kennedy Memorial Stadium

- Date: Sunday, December 4, 1983
- Game time: 1:00pm(ET)
- Game weather: 43 °F (6 °C), relative humidity 76%, wind 9 mph (14 km/h)
- Referee: Tom Dooley
- TV announcers (CBS): Jim Hill and Tom Brookshier
- Pro-Football-Reference.com

==== Week 15: at Dallas Cowboys ====
Team	1	2	3	4	Total
• **Redskins (13–2)**	14	0	7	10	31
Cowboys (12–3)	7	3	0	0	10

- Date: December 11
- Location: Texas Stadium, Irving, Texas
- Game start: 3:00 p.m. CST
- Game weather: 67 °F (19 °C); wind NW 23 mph (37 km/h)
- Referee: Dick Jorgensen
- TV announcers (CBS): Pat Summerall and John Madden

Scoring summary
1	WSH	John Riggins 3 yard run (Mark Moseley kick)	WSH 7–0
1	WSH	Clint Didier 40 yard pass from Joe Theismann (Mark Moseley kick0	WSH 14–0
1	DAL	Doug Cosbie 29 yard pass from Danny White (Rafael Septién kick)	WSH 14–7
2	DAL	Rafael Septien 35 yard field goal	WSH 14–10
3	WSH	Art Monk 43 yard pass from Joe Theismann (Mark Moseley kick)	WSH 21–10
4	WSH	John Riggins 1 yard run (Mark Moseley kick)	WSH 28–10
4	WSH	Mark Moseley 38 yard field goal	WSH 31–10

==== Week 16: vs. New York Giants ====
Quarter	1	2	3	4	Total
Giants (3–12–1)	3	9	7	3	**22**
**Redskins (14–2)**	0	7	7	17	**31**

at Robert F. Kennedy Memorial Stadium

- Date: Saturday, December 17, 1983
- Game time: 12:30pm(ET)
- Game weather: 40 °F (4 °C), relative humidity 50%, wind 8.2 mph (13.2 km/h)
- Referee: Gordon McCarter
- TV announcers (CBS): Pat Summerall and John Madden
- Pro-Football-Reference.com

Game information

**First quarter**

- Giants - Ali Haji-Sheikh 20 yard field goal - **NYG 3, Wash 0**

**Second quarter**

- Redskins - Charlie Brown 17 yard pass from Joe Theismann (Mark Moseley kick) - **NYG 3, Wash 7**
- Giants - Ali Haji-Sheikh 39 yard field goal - **NYG 6, Wash 7**
- Giants - Ali Haji-Sheikh 19 yard field goal - **NYG 9, Wash 7**
- Giants - Ali Haji-Sheikh 45 yard field goal - **NYG 12, Wash 7**

**Third quarter**

- Giants - Joe Morris 6 yard pass from Jeff Rutledge (Ali Haji-Sheikh kick) - **NYG 19, Wash 7**
- Redskins - Joe Theismann 3 yard rush (Mark Moseley kick) - **NYG 19, Wash 14**

**Fourth quarter**

- Redskins - Mark Moseley 46 yard field goal - **NYG 19, Wash 17**
- Giants - Ali Haji-Sheikh 28 yard field goal - **NYG 22, Wash 17**
- Redskins - Clint Didier 7 yard pass from Joe Theismann (Mark Moseley kick) - **NYG 22, Wash 24**
- Redskins - John Riggins 2 yard rush (Mark Moseley kick) - **NYG 22, Wash 31**

**Vegas Spread**

- Vegas Line= Wash -15.5
- Over/Under= 44.5**(Over)**

== Playoffs ==
Round	Date	Opponent (seed)	Result	Venue	Attendance	Game recap
Divisional	January 1, 1984	Los Angeles Rams (5)	W 51–7	RFK Stadium	55,363	Recap
Conference Championship	January 8, 1984	San Francisco 49ers (2)	W 24–21	RFK Stadium	55,363	Recap
Super Bowl XVIII	January 22, 1984	Los Angeles Raiders (A1)	L 9–38	Tampa Stadium	72,920	Recap

=== January 1, 1984 ===
==== NFC: Washington Redskins 51, Los Angeles Rams 7 ====
Game summary

Quarter	1	2	3	4	Total
Rams	0	7	0	0	7
Redskins	17	21	6	7	51

at Robert F. Kennedy Memorial Stadium, Washington, D.C.

- Game time: 12:30 p.m. EST
- Game weather: 38 °F (3 °C), mostly cloudy
- Game attendance: 54,440
- Referee: Ben Dreith
- TV announcers (CBS): Pat Summerall and John Madden

Game information
- Scoring
  - WAS – Riggins 3 run (Moseley kick)WAS 7–0
  - WAS – Monk 40 pass from Theismann (Moseley kick) 14–0
  - WAS – field goal Moseley 42 WAS 17–0
  - WAS – Riggins 1 run (Moseley kick) WAS 24–0
  - LA – Dennard 32 pass from Ferragamo (Lansford kick) WAS 24–7
  - WAS – Monk 21 pass from Theismann (Moseley kick) WAS 31–7
  - WAS – Riggins 1 run (Moseley kick) WAS 38–7
  - WAS – field goal Moseley 36 WAS 41–7
  - WAS – field goal Moseley 41 WAS 44–7
  - WAS – Green 72 interception return (Moseley kick) WAS 51–7

=== January 8, 1984 ===
==== NFC Championship: Washington Redskins 24, San Francisco 49ers 21 ====
Game summary

Quarter	1	2	3	4	Total
49ers	0	0	0	21	21
Redskins	0	7	14	3	24

at Robert F. Kennedy Memorial Stadium, Washington, D.C.

- Game time: 12:30 p.m. EST
- Game weather: 39 °F (4 °C), mostly cloudy
- Game attendance: 55,363
- Referee: Jerry Markbreit
- TV announcers (CBS): Pat Summerall and John Madden

Game information
- Scoring
  - WAS – Riggins 4 run (Moseley kick) WAS 7–0
  - WAS – Riggins 1 run (Moseley kick) WAS 14–0
  - WAS – Brown 70 pass from Theismann (Moseley kick) WAS 21–0
  - SF – Wilson 5 pass from Montana (Wersching kick) WAS 21–7
  - SF – Solomon 76 pass from Montana (Wersching kick) WAS 21–14
  - SF – Wilson 12 pass from Montana (Wersching kick) 21–21
  - WAS – field goal Moseley 25 WAS 24–21

== Super Bowl XVIII: Los Angeles Raiders 38, Washington Redskins 9 ==
Game summary

Quarter	1	2	3	4	Total
Redskins (NFC)	0	3	6	0	9
Raiders (AFC)	7	14	14	3	38

at Tampa Stadium, Tampa, Florida

- Date: January 22, 1984
- Game attendance: 72,920
- Referee: Gene Barth
- TV announcers (CBS): Pat Summerall and John Madden

== Standings ==
NFC East
	W	L	T	PCT	DIV	CONF	PF	PA	STK
^{(1)} Washington Redskins	14	2	0	.875	7–1	10–2	541	332	W9
^{(4)} Dallas Cowboys	12	4	0	.750	7–1	10–2	479	360	L2
St. Louis Cardinals	8	7	1	.531	3–4–1	5–6–1	374	428	W3
Philadelphia Eagles	5	11	0	.313	1–7	4–10	233	322	L2
New York Giants	3	12	1	.219	1–6–1	3–8–1	267	347	L4

== Awards and records ==
- Joe Gibbs, National Football League Coach of the Year Award
- John Riggins, Bert Bell Award
- Joe Theismann, AP NFL MVP
- Joe Theismann, PFWA NFL MVP
- Joe Theismann, NEA NFL MVP
- Joe Theismann, National Football League Offensive Player of the Year Award
- John Riggins, 1,347 Rushing Yards and set record with 24 rushing TDs (Held the TD record for 12 Years)
- Team scoring: 541 points (Held record until 1998)
- Turnover differential: +43 (Record still stands today. Next closest is Cleveland with +33 in 1946.)
