= Marcellus Greene =

American football player (born 1957)

No. 21, 25
- Position: Defensive back

Personal information
- Born: December 12, 1957 (age 68); Indianapolis, Indiana, U.S.
- Listed height: 6 ft 0 in (1.83 m)
- Listed weight: 185 lb (84 kg)

Career information
- High school: Shortridge (Indianapolis)
- College: Arizona
- NFL draft: 1981: 11th round, 296th overall pick

Career history
- Los Angeles Rams (1981)*; Toronto Argonauts (1981); Saskatchewan Roughriders (1982); Toronto Argonauts (1983); Minnesota Vikings (1984); Toronto Argonauts (1985–1987)
- * Offseason or practice squad member only

Awards and highlights
- Grey Cup champion (1983); 2× Second-team All-Pac-10 (1979, 1980)
- Stats at Pro Football Reference

Marcellus Lamont Greene (born December 12, 1957) is an American former professional football player who was a defensive back for one season with the Minnesota Vikings of the National Football League (NFL). He played college football for the Cincinnati Bearcats and Arizona Wildcats. Greene was selected by the Los Angeles Rams in the 11th round of the 1981 NFL draft. He was also a member of the Toronto Argonauts and Saskatchewan Roughriders of the Canadian Football League (CFL).

== Early life ==
Greene attended Shortridge High School in Indianapolis, Indiana.

== College career ==
Greene first played college football in 1977 for the Cincinnati Bearcats of the University of Cincinnati.

He transferred to play for the Arizona Wildcats of the University of Arizona from 1979 to 1980, earning Second-team All-Pac-10 honors both seasons.

== Professional career ==
Greene was selected by the Los Angeles Rams in the 11th round with the 296th pick in the 1981 NFL draft. He played in thirteen games for the Toronto Argonauts in 1981. He played in sixteen games for the Saskatchewan Roughriders during the 1982 season.

Greene played in twelve games for the Toronto Argonauts in 1983. He played in fourteen games for the Minnesota Vikings during the 1984 season. He played in 21 games for the Toronto Argonauts from 1985 to 1987.
