= 1979 All-Pacific-10 Conference football team =

The 1979 All-Pacific-10 Conference football team consists of American football players chosen by various organizations for All-Pacific-10 Conference teams for the 1979 NCAA Division I-A football season.

== Offensive selections ==
=== Quarterbacks ===
- Paul McDonald, USC (Coaches-1)
- Rich Campbell, California (Coaches-2)

=== Running backs ===
- Charles White, USC (Coaches-1)
- Freeman McNeil, UCLA (Coaches-1)
- Joe Steele, Washington (Coaches-1)
- Paul Jones, California (Coaches-2)
- Tali Ena, Washington State (Coaches-2)

=== Wide receivers ===
- Ken Margerum, Stanford (Coaches-1)
- Steve Coury, Oregon St. (Coaches-1)
- Hubie Oliver, Arizona (Coaches-2)
- Kevin Williams, USC (Coaches-2)

=== Tight ends ===
- Hoby Brenner, USC (Coaches-1)
- Joe Rose, California (Coaches-2)

=== Tackles ===
- Keith Van Horne, USC (Coaches-1)
- Tom Turnure, Washington (Coaches-1)
- Brian Holloway, Stanford (Coaches-2)
- Joe Sanford, Washington (Coaches-2)

=== Guards ===
- Brad Budde, USC (Coaches-1)
- Roy Foster, USC (Coaches-1)
- Brent Boyd, UCLA (Coaches-2)

=== Centers ===
- Allan Kennedy, Washington St. (Coaches-1)
- Chris Foote, USC (Coaches-2)

== Defensive selections ==
=== Linemen ===
- Doug Martin, Washington (Coaches-1)
- Bob Kohrs, Arizona St. (Coaches-1)
- Vince Goldsmith, Oregon (Coaches-1)
- Cleveland Crosby, Arizona (Coaches-1)
- Pat Graham, California (Coaches-2)
- Chuck Evans, Stanford (Coaches-2)
- Myron Lapka, USC (Coaches-2)
- Neil Elshire, Oregon (Coaches-2)

=== Linebackers ===
- Dennis Johnson, USC (Coaches-1)
- Antowaine Richardson, Washington (Coaches-1)
- Bruce Harrell, Washington (Coaches-1)
- Riki Gray, USC (Coaches-1)
- Chip Banks, USC (Coaches-2)
- Greg Bracelin, California (Coaches-2)
- Stan Holloway, California (Coaches-2)
- Rich Dixon, California (Coaches-2)

=== Defensive backs ===
- Kenny Easley, UCLA (Coaches-1)
- Mark Lee, Washington (Coaches-1)
- Ronnie Lott, USC (Coaches-1)
- Dennis Smith, USC (Coaches-1)
- Dave Liggins, Arizona (Coaches-2)
- Marcellus Greene, Arizona (Coaches-2)
- Greg Grimes, Washington (Coaches-2)
- Tim Smith, Oregon State (Coaches-2)

== Special teams ==
=== Placekickers ===
- Ken Naber, Stanford (Coaches-1)
- Mike Lansford, Washington (Coaches-2)

=== Punters ===
- Ken Naber, Stanford (Coaches-1)
- Tim Davey, Washington State (Coaches-2)

=== Return specialist ===
- Mark Lee, Washington (Coaches-1)
- Ray Butler, USC (Coaches-2)

== Key ==
Coaches = Pacific-10 head football coaches

== See also ==
- 1979 College Football All-America Team
