= Doug Martin (defensive end) =

American football player (1957–2026)

No. 79
- Position: Defensive end

Personal information
- Born: May 22, 1957; Fairfield, California, U.S.
- Died: April 18, 2026 (aged 68)
- Listed height: 6 ft 3 in (1.91 m)
- Listed weight: 260 lb (118 kg)

Career information
- High school: Armijo (Fairfield)
- College: Washington
- NFL draft: 1980: 1st round, 9th overall pick

Career history
- Minnesota Vikings (1980–1989)

Awards and highlights
- First-team All-Pro (1982); NFL sacks leader (1982); Second-team All-American (1979); 2× First-team All-Pac-10 (1978, 1979); Second-team All-Pac-8 (1977)

Career NFL statistics
- Sacks: 61.5
- Interceptions: 1
- Fumble recoveries: 7
- Fumble return yards: 29
- Stats at Pro Football Reference

Doug Martin (May 22, 1957 – April 18, 2026) was an American professional football player who was a defensive end for the Minnesota Vikings of the National Football League (NFL). He was selected by the Vikings in the first round of the 1980 NFL draft with the ninth overall pick. A 6 ft 3 in (1.91 m), 258 pounds (117 kg) defensive end who played college football for the Washington Huskies, Martin played in 10 NFL seasons from 1980 to 1989 for the Vikings.

Martin died on April 18, 2026, at the age of 68.
