= Bob Kohrs =

American football player (born 1958)

No. 90
- Position: Linebacker

Personal information
- Born: November 8, 1958 (age 67); Phoenix, Arizona, U.S
- Listed height: 6 ft 3 in (1.91 m)
- Listed weight: 240 lb (109 kg)

Career information
- High school: Brophy College Preparatory (Phoenix, Arizona)
- College: Arizona State
- NFL draft: 1980: 2nd round, 35th overall pick

Career history
- Pittsburgh Steelers (1981–1985)

Awards and highlights
- Third-team All-American (1979); First-team All-Pac-10 (1979)

Career NFL statistics
- Sacks: 9
- Fumble recoveries: 3
- Safeties: 1
- Stats at Pro Football Reference

Robert Henry Kohrs (born November 8, 1958) is an American former professional football player who was a defensive back and linebacker for the Pittsburgh Steelers of the National Football League (NFL). He played college football for the Arizona State Sun Devils before being selected in the second round of the 1980 NFL draft.

== Football career ==
Kohrs was born and raised in Phoenix. He had an outstanding high school career at Brophy College Preparatory and was recruited to play for the Sun Devils in 1976. With Arizona State Kohrs racked up 214 tackles and 30 quarterback sacks. In 1977, he helped the Sun Devils clinch a half-share of the WAC title and berth in the Fiesta Bowl. The next season, in a game against new Pac-10 rival USC, then ranked second in the nation, Kohrs racked up six tackles, including a sack, three fumble recoveries, and three pass deflections, earning himself "Player of the week" honors from Sports Illustrated magazine. Later in the 1978 campaign, Kohrs had 15 tackles in a game against Arizona. Kohrs made first-team All-Pac-10 in 1979. He was selected in the 2nd round of the 1980 NFL Draft by the Pittsburgh Steelers. He played five seasons in the NFL before retiring after the 1985 season.
