= Blanchard Montgomery =

American football player (born 1961)

Blanchard Montgomery III
No. 60, 52
- Position: Linebacker

Personal information
- Born: February 17, 1961 (age 65); Los Angeles, California, U.S.
- Listed height: 6 ft 2 in (1.88 m)
- Listed weight: 236 lb (107 kg)

Career information
- High school: Granada Hills Charter (Los Angeles)
- College: UCLA
- NFL draft: 1983: 3rd round, 59th overall pick

Career history
- San Francisco 49ers (1983–1984); Buffalo Bills (1985)*
- * Offseason or practice squad member only

Awards and highlights
- Super Bowl champion (XIX)

Career NFL statistics
- Fumble recoveries: 1
- Stats at Pro Football Reference

Blanchard Montgomery III (born February 17, 1961) is an American former professional football player who was a linebacker in the National Football League (NFL).

After playing his college ball at UCLA, Montgomery was selected 59th overall in the third round of the 1983 NFL draft. Montgomery played just two seasons in the NFL, but was a member of the Super Bowl XIX champion San Francisco 49ers team.
