= Stan Holloway =

American football player (born 1957)

No. 51
- Position: Linebacker

Personal information
- Born: September 28, 1957 (age 69); San Francisco, California, U.S.
- Listed height: 6 ft 2 in (1.88 m)
- Listed weight: 218 lb (99 kg)

Career information
- High school: Lowell (San Francisco)
- College: California
- NFL draft: 1980: undrafted

Career history
- New Orleans Saints (1980); Oakland Invaders (1984)*
- * Offseason or practice squad member only

Awards and highlights
- Second-team All-Pac-10 (1979)
- Stats at Pro Football Reference

Stanley O'Neill Holloway (born September 28, 1957) is an American former professional football linebacker who played for the New Orleans Saints of the National Football League (NFL). He played college football for the California Golden Bears.

== Early life ==
Stanley O'Neill Holloway was born on September 28, 1957, in San Francisco, California. He attended Lowell High School in San Francisco.

== College career ==
Holloway played junior college football at City College of San Francisco from 1976 to 1977. He transferred to the University of California, Berkeley, where he was a two-year letterman for the Golden Bears from 1978 to 1979. He pulled his hamstring early in the 1978 season but played through the pain the remainder of the year, winning the team's Joe Roth Memorial Award. Holloway earned second-team All-Pacific-10 Conference honors in 1979. He majored in city planning at California.

== Professional career ==
After going undrafted in the 1980 NFL draft, Holloway signed with the New Orleans Saints on May 19. He was placed on injured reserve on October 25 and activated on November 28. He played in 11 games overall, starting two, for the Saints during the 1980 season. Holloway returned one kick for no yards before fumbling the ball. He was released on August 3, 1981, before the first game of the 1981 preseason.

Holloway was signed by the Oakland Invaders of the United States Football League on January 11, 1984. He was released on February 13, 1984, 13 days before the Invaders' regular season opener.
