= Ali Haji-Sheikh =

American football player (born 1961)

No. 6
- Position: Placekicker

Personal information
- Born: January 11, 1961 (age 65); Ann Arbor, Michigan, U.S.
- Listed height: 6 ft 0 in (1.83 m)
- Listed weight: 172 lb (78 kg)

Career information
- High school: Arlington (Arlington, Texas)
- College: Michigan
- NFL draft: 1983: 9th round, 237th overall pick

Career history
- New York Giants (1983–1985); Atlanta Falcons (1986); Washington Redskins (1987); Detroit Lions (1989)*
- * Offseason or practice squad member only

Awards and highlights
- Super Bowl champion (XXII); First-team All-Pro (1983); Pro Bowl (1983); PFWA All-Rookie Team (1983); PFW Golden Toe Award (1983); Second-team All-Big Ten (1982)

Career NFL statistics
- FG / Attempts: 76 / 111
- Field goal %: 68.5
- PAT / Attempts: 95 / 103
- PAT %: 92.2
- Long: 56
- Career points: 323
- Stats at Pro Football Reference

Ali S. Haji-Sheikh (born January 11, 1961) is an American former professional football player who was a kicker in the National Football League (NFL). He played college football for the Michigan Wolverines. He was selected in the ninth round (237th overall) of the 1983 NFL draft by the New York Giants. He also played for the Atlanta Falcons and Washington Redskins.

While at Michigan, Haji-Sheikh set a Big Ten record with 78 consecutive extra points, and he broke the NFL record for the most field goals in a season, as a rookie during the 1983 NFL season.

== Early life ==
Haji-Sheikh was born in Ann Arbor, Michigan, and raised in Texas. He is the son of Abdolhossein Haji-Sheikh, a professor of Mechanical and Aerospace Engineering at the University of Texas at Arlington who is originally from Iran. His father coached him in soccer and football. Haji-Sheikh attended Arlington High School where he also played wide receiver and defensive back.

== College career ==
Haji-Sheikh attended the University of Michigan from 1979 to 1982 as a placekicker for the Wolverines, and in 1986 earned a Bachelor of Science in geology. While attending Michigan, he set a Big Ten record by successfully converting 76 consecutive extra points. He also set the school records for career extra points (117) and field goals (31).

=== Career statistics ===
Year	Team	GP	Field goals					Extra points				Total Points
Year	Team	GP	FGA	FGM	FG%	Blk	Lng	XPA	XPM	XP%	Blk	Total Points
1979	Michigan Wolverines	12	6	0	0.0	0	—	4	4	100.0	0	4
1980	Michigan Wolverines	12	17	11	64.7	0	—	40	37	92.5	3	70
1981	Michigan Wolverines	0	DNP									
1982	Michigan Wolverines	12	15	12	80.0	0	—	41	41	100.0	0	77
Career		36	38	23	60.5	0	—	85	82	96.5	3	151

== Professional career ==
Haji-Sheikh was selected by the New York Giants in the ninth round (237th overall pick) of the 1983 NFL draft. He spent three seasons playing for the Giants. As a rookie in 1983 he was successful in 35-of-42 field goal attempts (83%). His 35 field goals in 1983 broke Jim Turner's NFL record for field goals in a season. Haji-Sheikh's record stood until 1996. A recurring hamstring injury hampered the rest of his career.

In 1986, Haji-Sheikh joined the Atlanta Falcons after three seasons with the Giants. He appeared in six games for the Falcons, was successful on 9-of-12 field goal attempts, and converted 7-of-8 extra points.

Haji-Sheikh was released by the Falcons in late August 1987. In mid-September 1987, he signed with the Washington Redskins after an injury to the Redskins' regular placekicker Jess Atkinson. He appeared in 11 games for the Redskins during the 1987 season, was successful on 13-of-19 field goal attempts, and converted 29-of-32 extra points. He won his only career Super Bowl that season, kicking six extra points and missing one field goal in Super Bowl XXII. He appeared in the 1984 Pro Bowl kicking one field goal and adding six extra points. He finished his career with 76-of-111 field goals (68%) and 95-of-103 extra points, scoring 323 total points.

== NFL career statistics ==
Year	Team	GP	Field goals					Extra points				Total Points
Year	Team	GP	FGA	FGM	FG%	Blk	Lng	XPA	XPM	XP%	Blk	Total Points
1983	NYG	16	42	35	83.3	0	56	23	22	95.7	1	127
1984	NYG	16	33	17	51.5	0	48	35	32	91.4	3	83
1985	NYG	2	5	2	40.0	0	52	5	5	100.0	0	11
1986	ATL	6	12	9	75.0	0	47	8	7	87.5	1	34
1987	WAS	11	19	13	68.4	0	41	32	29	90.6	3	68
Career		51	111	76	68.5	0	56	103	95	92.2	8	323

== Personal life and later years ==
In 1984, Haji-Sheikh married Detroit native and fellow University of Michigan graduate Michele Blondin. As of 2016, the couple has five children. He now works in the luxury car business in Birmingham, Michigan, coaches travel soccer with Magic Soccer and trains upcoming kickers via his business Haji-Sheikh Kicking.
