= Byron Williams (gridiron football) =

American gridiron football player (born 1960)

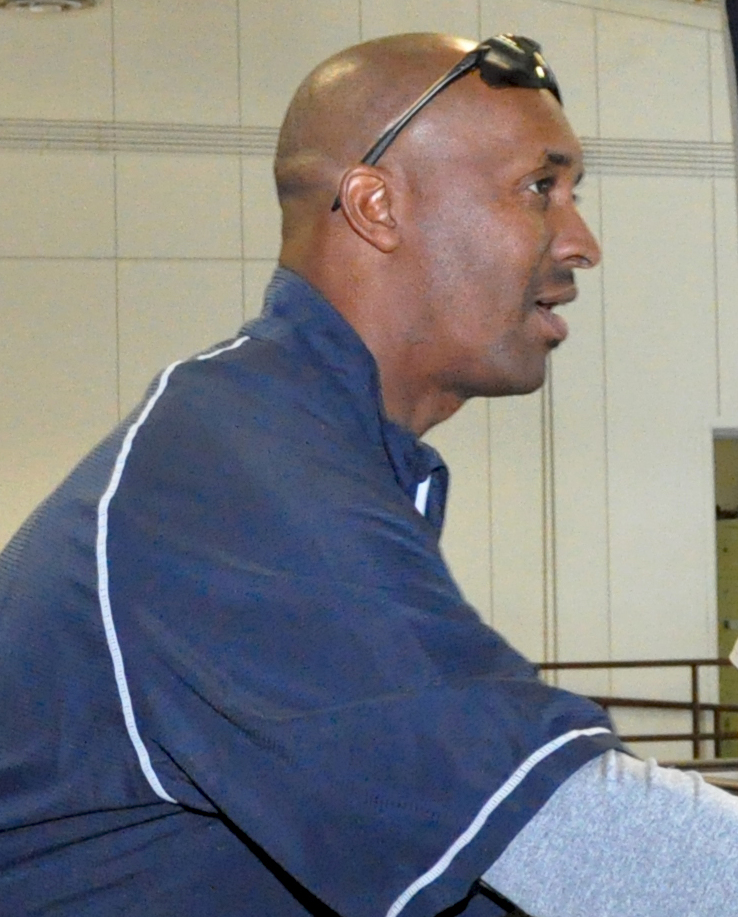
- Williams in 2013

No. 87, 6, 80, 88, 89
- Position: Wide receiver

Personal information
- Born: October 31, 1960 (age 66); Texarkana, Texas, U.S.
- Listed height: 6 ft 2 in (1.88 m)
- Listed weight: 182 lb (83 kg)

Career information
- High school: Liberty-Eylau (Texarkana)
- College: UT Arlington
- NFL draft: 1983: 10th round, 253rd overall pick

Career history
- Green Bay Packers (1983)*; Philadelphia Eagles (1983); New York Giants (1983–1985); Indianapolis Colts (1987)*; BC Lions (1987–1988); Ottawa Rough Riders (1989); Detroit Lions (1990)*; Orlando Thunder (1991); Saskatchewan Roughriders (1991); New York/New Jersey Knights (1992); Saskatchewan Roughriders (1992–1993); Baltimore Stallions (1994–1995)
- * Offseason or practice squad member only

Awards and highlights
- All-World League (1991)

Career NFL statistics
- Receptions: 59
- Receiving yards: 1,097
- Receiving touchdowns: 3
- Stats at Pro Football Reference

Byron Keith Williams (born October 31, 1960) is an American former professional football player who was a wide receiver in the National Football League (NFL). He was selected by the Green Bay Packers in the tenth round of the 1983 NFL draft. He played college football for the UT Arlington Mavericks.

Williams was also a member of the Philadelphia Eagles, New York Giants, Indianapolis Colts, B.C. Lions, Ottawa Rough Riders, Detroit Lions, Orlando Thunder, Saskatchewan Roughriders, New York/New Jersey Knights, and Baltimore Stallions.

== Professional career ==
=== Philadelphia Eagles ===
Williams was signed by the Philadelphia Eagles on September 13, 1983.

=== New York Giants ===
Williams was signed by the New York Giants on October 27, 1983.
