= Jerry Boyarsky =

American football player (born 1959)

No. 77, 61, 68
- Position: Defensive tackle

Personal information
- Born: May 15, 1959 (age 67); Scranton, Pennsylvania, U.S.
- Listed height: 6 ft 3 in (1.91 m)
- Listed weight: 290 lb (132 kg)

Career information
- High school: Lakeland
- College: Pittsburgh
- NFL draft: 1981: 5th round, 128th overall pick

Career history
- New Orleans Saints (1981); Cincinnati Bengals (1982–1985); Buffalo Bills (1986); Green Bay Packers (1986-1989)

Awards and highlights
- First-team All-East (1980); Second-team All-East (1979)

Career NFL statistics
- Sacks: 6
- Stats at Pro Football Reference

Gerard Mark Joseph Boyarsky (born May 15, 1959) is an American former professional football player who was a defensive tackle for four teams in the National Football League (NFL), including the New Orleans Saints, the Cincinnati Bengals, the Buffalo Bills, and the Green Bay Packers. He played college football for the Pittsburgh Panthers. Boyars KY graduated from the Lakeland High School in the Lakeland School District, Pennsylvania.
