= 1983 San Francisco 49ers season =

American football team season

- Owner: Edward J. DeBartolo Jr.
- General manager: John McVay
- President: Bill Walsh
- Head coach: Bill Walsh
- Defensive coordinator: George Seifert
- Home stadium: Candlestick Park

Results
- Record: 10–6
- Division place: 1st NFC West
- Playoffs: Won Divisional Playoffs (vs. Lions) 24–23; Lost NFC Championship (at Redskins) 21–24
- Pro Bowlers: QB Joe Montana; DE Fred Dean; CB Ronnie Lott; FS Dwight Hicks

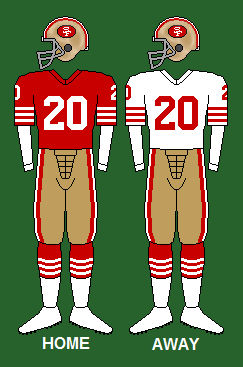
The uniform of the San Francisco 49ers, 1976-1983.

The 1983 San Francisco 49ers season was the franchise's 34th season in the National Football League and their 38th overall. The team attempted to improve on its 3–6 record from 1982. The 49ers started the season with a loss to the Philadelphia Eagles, 22–17. However, the 49ers throttled the Vikings the next week 48–17 and then the Cardinals the following week 42–27. They ended the first half of the season 6–2 before splitting their last eight games to finish the season 10–6 and clinching the NFC West and the #2 seed in the playoffs. In the divisional round of the playoffs, the 49ers came back to beat the Lions 24–23 after Joe Montana found Freddie Solomon in the end zone with 1:23 remaining, and Lions kicker Eddie Murray missed a 41-yard field goal as time expired. However, in the NFC Championship game, the 49ers were not able to outlast the top-seeded Redskins, as after coming back to tie a game in which they trailed 21–0 at the start of the 4th quarter, they lost 24–21 after Washington took the lead on a field goal with 40 seconds left in the game.

== Offseason ==
=== NFL draft ===
1983 San Francisco 49ers draft
Round	Pick	Player	Position	College	Notes
2	49	Roger Craig * ^{†}	RB	Nebraska	
3	59	Blanchard Montgomery	LB	UCLA	
4	90	Tom Holmoe	DB	BYU	
5	117	Riki Ellison	LB	USC	
7	175	Gary Moten	LB	SMU	
9	229	Mike Mularkey	TE	Florida	
10	259	Jeff Merrell	DT	Nebraska	
11	289	Jesse Sapolu *	C	Hawaii	
Made roster † Pro Football Hall of Fame * Made at least one Pro Bowl during career

== Personnel ==
=== Staff / Coaches ===
1983 San Francisco 49ers staff
Front office: Owner – Edward J. DeBartolo, Jr.; President – Bill Walsh; Vice President/General Counsel – Carmen Policy; General manager – John McVay; Director of College Scouting – Tony Razzano; Director of pro personnel – Allan Webb; Head coaches: Head coach – Bill Walsh; Offensive coaches: Quarterbacks/Receivers – Paul Hackett; Running Backs – Sherman Lewis; Offensive Line – Bobb McKittrick; Assistant Offensive Line/Tight Ends – Fred von Appen	Defensive coaches: Defensive coordinator – George Seifert; Defensive Line – Bill McPherson; Linebackers – Norb Hecker; Defensive Backs – Ray Rhodes; Defensive Assistant – Tommy Hart; Special teams coaches: Special Teams – Fred von Appen; Strength and conditioning: Physical Development Coordinator – Jerry Attaway

=== Roster ===
1983 San Francisco 49ers roster
Quarterbacks (QB): 7 Guy Benjamin; 6 Matt Cavanaugh; 16 Joe Montana; Running backs (RB): 33 Roger Craig; 25 Jeff Moore; 30 Bill Ring; 26 Wendell Tyler; Wide receivers (WR): 87 Dwight Clark; 84 Darius Durham; 83 Renaldo Nehemiah; 88 Freddie Solomon; 85 Mike Wilson; Tight ends (TE): 89 Earl Cooper; 81 Russ Francis; 80 Eason Ramson	Offensive linemen (OL): 68 John Ayers T; 51 Randy Cross G; 62 Walt Downing C; 71 Keith Fahnhorst T; 66 Allan Kennedy T; 77 Bubba Paris T; 56 Fred Quillan C; 61 Jesse Sapolu G; Defensive linemen (DL): 76 Dwaine Board DE; 74 Fred Dean DE; 67 Pete Kugler NT; 65 Lawrence Pillers DE; 72 Jeff Stover DE; 79 Jim Stuckey DE	Linebackers (LB): 57 Dan Bunz ILB; 50 Riki Ellison ILB; 59 Willie Harper OLB; 52 Bobby Leopold OLB; 53 Milt McColl OLB; 53 Gary Moten ILB; 64 Jack Reynolds ILB; 58 Keena Turner OLB; 54 Ron Ferrari ILB; Defensive backs (DB): 44 Richard Blackmore CB; 47 Tim Collier CB; 22 Dwight Hicks FS; 28 Tom Holmoe FS; 42 Ronnie Lott CB; 48 Ken McAlister SS; 43 Dana McLemore CB; 27 Carlton Williamson SS; 21 Eric Wright CB; Special teams (ST): 3 Tom Orosz P; 14 Ray Wersching K	Reserve: 15 Bryan Clark QB (IR); 24 Rick Gervais S (IR); 75 John Harty DE (IR); -- Robert Hubble DE (IR); -- Lonnie Lawson S (IR); -- John Macaulay C (IR); 32 Carl Monroe RB (IR); 60 Blanchard Montgomery LB (IR); -- Tim Morrison G (IR); -- Mike Wood K (IR); Rookies in italics

== Preseason ==
Week	Date	Opponent	Result	Record	Venue	Attendance
1	August 6	at Los Angeles Raiders	L 23–26 (OT)	0–1	Los Angeles Memorial Coliseum	41,337
2	August 14	New England Patriots	W 17–15	1–1	Candlestick Park	50,043
3	August 20	at San Diego Chargers	L 7–24	1–2	Jack Murphy Stadium	43,939
4	August 27	Seattle Seahawks	L 6–20	1–3	Candlestick Park	47,074

== Regular season ==
=== Schedule ===
Week	Date	Opponent	Result	Record	Venue	Attendance
1	September 3	Philadelphia Eagles	**L** 17–22	0–1	Candlestick Park	55,775
2	September 8	at Minnesota Vikings	**W** 48–17	1–1	Hubert H. Humphrey Metrodome	58,167
3	September 18	at St. Louis Cardinals	**W** 42–27	2–1	Busch Memorial Stadium	38,132
4	September 25	**Atlanta Falcons**	**W** 24–20	3–1	Candlestick Park	57,814
5	October 2	at New England Patriots	**W** 33–13	4–1	Sullivan Stadium	54,293
6	October 9	**Los Angeles Rams**	**L** 7–10	4–2	Candlestick Park	59,118
7	October 16	at **New Orleans Saints**	**W** 32–13	5–2	Louisiana Superdome	68,154
8	October 23	at **Los Angeles Rams**	**W** 45–35	6–2	Anaheim Stadium	66,070
9	October 30	New York Jets	**L** 13–27	6–3	Candlestick Park	54,796
10	November 6	Miami Dolphins	**L** 17–20	6–4	Candlestick Park	57,832
11	November 13	**New Orleans Saints**	**W** 27–0	7–4	Candlestick Park	40,022
12	November 20	at **Atlanta Falcons**	**L** 24–28	7–5	Atlanta–Fulton County Stadium	39,782
13	November 27	at Chicago Bears	**L** 3–13	7–6	Soldier Field	40,483
14	December 4	Tampa Bay Buccaneers	**W** 35–21	8–6	Candlestick Park	49,773
15	December 11	at Buffalo Bills	**W** 23–10	9–6	Rich Stadium	38,039
16	December 19	Dallas Cowboys	**W** 42–17	10–6	Candlestick Park	59,957
Note: Intra-division opponents are in **bold** text.

=== Game summaries ===
==== Week 2: at Minnesota Vikings ====
Team	1	2	3	4	Total
• 49ers	13	28	0	7	48
Vikings	7	3	7	0	17

- Date: September 8
- Location: Hubert H. Humphrey Metrodome
- Game start: 8:30 p.m. EST
- Game attendance: 58,167
- Game weather: Indoors (dome)
- Referee: Jim Tunney
- TV announcers (ABC): Frank Gifford, Howard Cosell, and O. J. Simpson

Scoring summary
Q1	SF	Wersching 38 yard field goal	SF 3–0
Q1	SF	Clark 21 yard pass from Montana (Wersching kick)	SF 10–0
Q1	MIN	Brown 1 yard run (Ricardo kick)	SF 10–7
Q1	SF	Wersching 32 yard field goal	SF 13–7
Q2	SF	Cooper 2 yard pass from Montana (Wersching kick)	SF 20–7
Q2	SF	Wright 60 yard interception return (Wersching kick)	SF 27–7
Q2	SF	Solomon 14 yard pass from Montana (Wersching kick)	SF 34–7
Q2	SF	Tyler 6 yard pass from Montana (Wersching kick)	SF 41–7
Q2	MIN	Ricardo 32 yard field goal	SF 41–10
Q3	MIN	LeCount 30 yard pass from Kramer (Ricardo kick)	SF 41–17
Q4	SF	Craig 1 yard run (Wersching kick)	SF 48–17

=== Standings ===
NFC West
	W	L	T	PCT	DIV	CONF	PF	PA	STK
San Francisco 49ers^{(2)}	10	6	0	.625	4–2	8–4	432	293	W3
Los Angeles Rams^{(5)}	9	7	0	.563	5–1	8–4	361	344	W1
New Orleans Saints	8	8	0	.500	2–4	7–5	319	337	L1
Atlanta Falcons	7	9	0	.438	1–5	4–8	370	389	W1

== Postseason ==
=== Schedule ===
Round	Date	Opponent (seed)	Result	Venue
Divisional	December 31	Detroit Lions (3)	W 24–23	Candlestick Park
NFC Championship	January 8, 1984	at Washington Redskins (1)	L 21–24	RFK Stadium

==== NFC Divisional Playoffs: vs. (3) Detroit Lions ====
NFC Divisional Playoffs: (3) Detroit Lions at (2) San Francisco 49ers – Game summary

Quarter	1	2	3	4	Total
Lions	3	6	0	14	23
49ers	7	7	3	7	24

at Candlestick Park, San Francisco

- Game time: 4:00 p.m. EST/1:00 p.m. PST
- Game weather: 59 °F or 15 °C, sunny
- Game attendance: 59,979
- Referee: Pat Haggerty
- TV announcers (CBS): Frank Glieber and Dick Vermeil

Game information
- Scoring
  - DET – field goal Murray 37 DET 3–0
  - SF – Craig 1 run (Wersching kick) SF 7–3
  - SF – Tyler 2 run (Wersching kick) SF 14–3
  - DET – field goal Murray 21 SF 14–6
  - DET – field goal Murray 54 SF 14–9
  - SF – field goal Wersching 19 SF 17–9
  - DET – Sims 11 run (Murray kick) SF 17–16
  - DET – Sims 3 run (Murray kick) DET 23–17
  - SF – Solomon 14 pass from Montana (Wersching kick) SF 24–23

Quarterback Joe Montana hit Freddie Solomon with a 14-yard touchdown pass with 1:23 left in the game as the 49ers held off the Lions 24–23. Lions kicker Eddie Murray missed a 43-yard field goal with 5 seconds left in the game, one of his two misses in the 4th quarter. Five interceptions of Lions quarterback Gary Danielson played a major role in the 49ers' win.

==== NFC Championship: at (1) Washington Redskins ====
NFC Championship: (2) San Francisco 49ers at (1) Washington Redskins – Game summary

Quarter	1	2	3	4	Total
49ers	0	0	0	21	21
Redskins	0	7	14	3	24

at Robert F. Kennedy Memorial Stadium, Washington, D.C.

- Game time: 12:30 p.m. EST
- Game weather: 39 °F or 3.9 °C, mostly cloudy
- Game attendance: 55,363
- Referee: Jerry Markbreit
- TV announcers (CBS): Pat Summerall and John Madden

Game information
- Scoring
  - WAS – Riggins 4 run (Moseley kick) WAS 7–0
  - WAS – Riggins 1 run (Moseley kick) WAS 14–0
  - WAS – Brown 70 pass from Theismann (Moseley kick) WAS 21–0
  - SF – Wilson 5 pass from Montana (Wersching kick) WAS 21–7
  - SF – Solomon 76 pass from Montana (Wersching kick) WAS 21–14
  - SF – Wilson 12 pass from Montana (Wersching kick) 21–21
  - WAS – field goal Moseley 25 WAS 24–21

The 49ers overcame a 21-point 4th-quarter deficit to tie the game. But two controversial calls against the 49ers set up a 25-yard field goal by Mark Moseley with 40 seconds remaining. Joe Montana was then intercepted on the last play of the game to seal the win for Washington.

== Awards and records ==
- Ray Wersching, Franchise Record, Most Field Goals in One Game, 6 Field Goals (October 16, 1983)
