= 1979 All-America college football team =

Official list of the best college football players of 1979

The 1979 All-America college football team is composed of college football players who were selected as All-Americans by various organizations and writers that chose College Football All-America Teams in 1979. The National Collegiate Athletic Association (NCAA) recognizes four selectors as "official" for the 1979 season. They are: (1) the American Football Coaches Association (AFCA) based on the input of more than 2,000 voting members; (2) the Associated Press (AP) selected based on the votes of sports writers at AP newspapers; (3) the Football Writers Association of America (FWAA) selected by the nation's football writers; and (4) the United Press International (UPI) selected based on the votes of sports writers at UPI newspapers. Other selectors included Football News (FN), the Newspaper Enterprise Association (NEA), The Sporting News (TSN), and the Walter Camp Football Foundation (WC).

== Offense ==
=== Receivers ===
- Ken Margerum, Stanford (AFCA, AP-1, UPI-1, NEA-1, TSN, WC)
- Art Monk, Syracuse (FWAA)
- Johnny "Lam" Jones, Texas (TSN)
- Rick Beasley, Appalachian State (AP-2)
- Jackie Flowers, Florida State (UPI-2)
- Wayne Baumgardner, Wake Forest (NEA-2)
- Steve Coury, Oregon State (AP-3)

=== Tight ends ===
- Junior Miller, Nebraska (AFCA, AP-1, FWAA, UPI-1, NEA-1, TSN, WC)
- Mark Brammer, Michigan State (UPI-2)
- Dave Young, Purdue (AP-2)
- Mark Geisler, Ohio (NEA-2)
- Benjie Pryor, Pittsburgh (AP-3)

=== Tackles ===
- Greg Kolenda, Arkansas (AFCA, AP-1, FWAA, UPI-1, NEA-1, WC)
- Jim Bunch, Alabama (AP-1, AFCA [G], FWAA, UPI-2)
- Tim Foley, Notre Dame (AP-2, UPI-1, NEA-1, TSN)
- Melvin Jones, Houston (AFCA, AP-3, WC)
- Stan Brock, Colorado (NEA-2, TSN)
- Steve McKenzie, Purdue (AP-2)
- Irv Pankey, Penn State (NEA-2)
- Ray Snell, Wisconsin (UPI-2, TSN)
- Herman Parker, Long Beach State (AP-3)

=== Guards ===
- Brad Budde, USC (AFCA, AP-1, FWAA, UPI-1, NEA-1, TSN, WC)
- Ken Fritz, Ohio State (AP-1, FWAA, UPI-1, NEA-1, WC)
- Mike Brock, Alabama (AP-2)
- Pete Inge, San Diego State (AP-2, UPI-2)
- George Stewart, Arkansas (UPI-2)
- Mark Jones, Missouri (NEA-2)
- Mark Goodspeed, Nebraska (NEA-2)
- Wayne Inman, East Carolina (AP-3)
- Craig Wolfley, Syracuse (AP-3)

=== Centers ===
- Jim Ritcher, North Carolina State (AFCA, AP-1, FWAA, UPI-1, NEA-1, TSN, WC)
- Dwight Stephenson, Alabama (AP-2, UPI-2)
- Ray Donaldson, Georgia (AP-3, NEA-2)

=== Quarterbacks ===
- Marc Wilson, Brigham Young (AFCA, AP-1, FWAA, UPI-1, NEA-2, WC)
- Art Schlichter, Ohio State (AP-3, UPI-2, NEA-1, TSN)
- Paul McDonald, USC (AP-2)

=== Running backs ===
- Charles White, USC (AFCA, AP-1, FWAA, UPI-1, NEA-1, TSN, WC)
- Billy Sims, Oklahoma (AFCA, AP-1, FWAA, UPI-1, NEA-1, TSN, WC
- Vagas Ferguson, Notre Dame (AFCA, AP-2, FWAA, UPI-1, NEA-2, WC)
- George Rogers, South Carolina (AP-1, UPI-2, NEA-1)
- James Brooks, Auburn (AP-2)
- James Hadnot, Texas Tech (AP-2, UPI-2)
- Dennis Mosley, Iowa (AP-3, UPI-2)
- Jarvis Redwine, Nebraska (NEA-2)
- Joe Cribbs, Auburn (AP-3, NEA-2)
- Freeman McNeil, UCLA (AP-3)

== Defense ==
=== Defensive ends ===
- Hugh Green, Pittsburgh (AFCA, AP-1, FWAA, UPI-1, NEA-1, TSN, WC)
- Curtis Greer, Michigan (AFCA, FWAA, UPI-2 [DT], NEA-1)
- Jacob Green, Texas A&M (AP-1, UPI-2, WC)
- Rick Antle, Oklahoma State (AP-2)
- E. J. Junior, Alabama (AP-2)
- John Adams, LSU (UPI-2)
- Rush Brown, Ball State (NEA-2 [DL])
- Gerry Gluscic, Indiana State (AP-3)
- Bob Kohrs, Arizona State (AP-3)

=== Defensive tackles ===
- Steve McMichael, Texas (AFCA, AP-1, FWAA, UPI-1, NEA-2, WC)
- Bruce Clark, Penn State (AFCA, FWAA, UPI-1, NEA-1 [NG], TSN, WC)
- Jim Stuckey, Clemson (AP-1, FWAA, UPI-1 [DE], NEA-1, TSN [DE])
- Hosea Taylor, Houston (NEA-1)
- Rulon Jones, Utah State (AP-2, NEA-2, TSN)
- Doug Martin, Washington (AP-2, UPI-2, NEA-2)
- Cleveland Crosby, Arizona (AP-3)
- Dino Mangiero, Rutgers (AP-3)

=== Middle guards ===
- Ron Simmons, Florida State (AFCA, AP-1, UPI-1, NEA-2, WC)
- Ken Loushin, Purdue (AP-2)
- Kerry Weinmaster, Nebraska (UPI-2)
- George Mays, Army (AP-3)

=== Linebackers ===
- George Cumby, Oklahoma (AFCA, AP-1, FWAA, UPI-1, NEA-1, TSN, WC)
- Mike Singletary, Baylor (AFCA, AP-1, FWAA, UPI-2, NEA-2, WC)
- Ron Simpkins, Michigan (AP-1, FWAA, UPI-1, NEA-2, WC)
- Dennis Johnson, USC (UPI-1, TSN)
- Otis Wilson, Louisville (NEA-1, TSN)
- David Hodge, Houston (AFCA, AP-2)
- Dan Bass, Michigan State (AP-2)
- Lance Mehl, Penn State (AP-2, UPI-2)
- Otis Wilson, Louisville (AP-3, UPI-2)
- Tom Boyd, Alabama (AP-3)
- Bob Crable, Notre Dame (AP-3)

=== Defensive backs ===
- Kenny Easley, UCLA (AFCA, AP-1, FWAA, UPI-1, NEA-1, TSN, WC)
- Johnnie Johnson, Texas (AFCA, AP-1, FWAA, UPI-1, NEA-1, TSN, WC)
- Roland James, Tennessee (AFCA, AP-2, FWAA, UPI-1, NEA-1, TSN, WC)
- Don McNeal, Alabama (AP-3, NEA-1, TSN)
- Mark Haynes, Colorado (AP-1, UPI-2)
- Derrick Hatchett, Texas (AP-2)
- Lovie Smith, Tulsa (AP-2)
- Darrol Ray, Oklahoma (UPI-2)
- Mike Guess, Ohio State (UPI-2)
- Willie Teal, LSU (NEA-2)
- Mark Lee, Washington (NEA-2)
- Roynell Young, Alcorn State (NEA-2)
- Vince Skillings, Ohio State (NEA-2)
- Monk Bonasorte, Florida State (AP-3)
- Dennis Smith, USC (AP-3)

== Special teams ==
=== Kickers ===
- Dale Castro, Maryland (FWAA, UPI-1, NEA-1, TSN, WC)
- Ish Ordonez, Arkansas (UPI-2, NEA-2)

=== Punters ===
- Jim Miller, Ole Miss (FWAA, UPI-1, NEA-1, TSN, WC)
- Mike Smith, Wyoming (UPI-2)
- Ken Naber, Stanford (NEA-2)

== Key ==
- **Bold** – Consensus All-American
- -1 – First-team selection
- -2 – Second-team selection
- -3 – Third-team selection

=== Official selectors ===
- AFCA – American Football Coaches Association
- AP – Associated Press
- FWAA – Football Writers Association of America
- UPI – United Press International

=== Other selectors ===
- FN – Football News
- NEA – Newspaper Enterprise Association
- TSN – The Sporting News
- WC – Walter Camp Football Foundation

== See also ==
- 1979 All-Atlantic Coast Conference football team
- 1979 All-Big Eight Conference football team
- 1979 All-Big Ten Conference football team
- 1979 All-Pacific-10 Conference football team
- 1979 All-SEC football team
