= Dean Miraldi =

American football player (born 1958)

No. 64, 67
- Positions: Guard, tackle

Personal information
- Born: April 8, 1958 (age 68); Culver City, California, U.S.
- Listed height: 6 ft 5 in (1.96 m)
- Listed weight: 266 lb (121 kg)

Career information
- High school: Rosemead (Rosemead, California)
- College: Utah
- NFL draft: 1981: 2nd round, 55th overall pick

Career history
- Philadelphia Eagles (1981–1984); Denver Broncos (1985); Los Angeles Raiders (1987)

Career NFL statistics
- Games played: 50
- Games started: 32
- Stats at Pro Football Reference

Dean Martin Miraldi (born April 8, 1958) is an American former professional football player who was a guard in the National Football League (NFL) for the Philadelphia Eagles, Denver Broncos, and the Los Angeles Raiders. He played college football for the Utah Utes and was selected by the Eagles in the second round of the 1981 NFL draft.
