= 1984 Pro Bowl =

National Football League all-star game

1984 NFL Pro Bowl
NFC	AFC
45	3
Head coach: Bill Walsh (San Francisco 49ers)	Head coach: Chuck Knox (Seattle Seahawks)
	1	2	3	4	Total
NFC	3	14	14	14	45
AFC	0	3	0	0	3
- Date: January 29, 1984
- Stadium: Aloha Stadium; Honolulu, Hawaii
- MVP: Joe Theismann (Washington Redskins)
- Referee: Jerry Seeman
- Attendance: 50,445

TV in the United States
- Network: ABC
- Announcers: Frank Gifford, O. J. Simpson & Lynn Swann

The 1984 Pro Bowl was the 34th Pro Bowl, the annual all-star game of the National Football League (NFL), and featured the outstanding performers from the 1983 season. The game was contested by teams representing the National Football Conference (NFC) and American Football Conference (AFC), and played on January 29, 1984, at Aloha Stadium in Honolulu, Hawaii before a crowd of 50,445. The NFC won the game 45–3.

Chuck Knox of the Seattle Seahawks led the AFC team against an NFC team coached by San Francisco 49ers head coach Bill Walsh. The referee was Jerry Seeman.

Joe Theismann of the Washington Redskins was named the game's Most Valuable Player. Players on the winning NFC team received $10,000 apiece while the AFC participants each took home $5,000.

== AFC roster ==
=== Offense ===
Position	Starter(s)	Reserve(s)
Quarterback	14 Dan Fouts, San Diego	9 Bill Kenney, Kansas City; 13 Dan Marino, Miami
Running back	28 Curt Warner, Seattle	34 Earl Campbell, Houston; 20 Joe Cribbs, Buffalo
Fullback	33 Tony Collins, New England	
Wide receiver	85 Mark Duper, Miami; 80 Cris Collinsworth, Cincinnati	89 Wes Chandler, San Diego; 82 John Stallworth, Pittsburgh
Tight end	46 Todd Christensen, L.A. Raiders	89 Kellen Winslow, San Diego
Offensive tackle	78 Anthony Muñoz, Cincinnati; 76 Brian Holloway, New England	79 Marvin Powell, New York Jets; 70 Henry Lawrence, L. A. Raiders
Offensive guard	73 John Hannah, New England; 64 Ed Newman, Miami	75 Chris Hinton, Baltimore; 67 Bob Kuechenberg, Miami
Center	52 Mike Webster, Pittsburgh	57 Dwight Stephenson, Miami

=== Defense ===
Position	Starter(s)	Reserve(s)
Defensive end	99 Mark Gastineau, New York Jets; 75 Doug Betters, Miami	75 Howie Long, L.A. Raiders
Defensive tackle	73 Bob Baumhower, Miami; 76 Fred Smerlas, Buffalo	73 Joe Klecko, New York Jets
Outside linebacker	53 Rod Martin, L.A. Raiders; 56 Chip Banks, Cleveland	83 Ted Hendricks, L.A. Raiders
Inside linebacker	58 Jack Lambert, Pittsburgh	53 Randy Gradishar, Denver
Cornerback	37 Lester Hayes, L.A. Raiders; 24 Gary Green, Kansas City	20 Louis Wright, Denver; 26 Raymond Clayborn, New England
Free safety	20 Deron Cherry, Kansas City	26 Vann McElroy, L.A. Raiders
Strong safety	45 Kenny Easley, Seattle	

=== Special teams ===
Position	Starter(s)
Punter	3 Rich Camarillo, New England
Placekicker	1 Gary Anderson, Pittsburgh
Kick returner	34 Greg Pruitt, L. A. Raiders

== NFC roster ==
=== Offense ===
Position	Starter(s)	Reserve(s)
Quarterback	7 Joe Theismann, Washington	16 Joe Montana, San Francisco
Running back	28 Eric Dickerson, L.A. Rams	34 Walter Payton, Chicago; 33 Tony Dorsett, Dallas
Fullback	31 William Andrews, Atlanta	
Wide receiver	81 Roy Green, St. Louis; 82 Mike Quick, Philadelphia	87 Charlie Brown, Washington; 80 James Lofton, Green Bay
Tight end	82 Paul Coffman, Green Bay	84 Doug Cosbie, Dallas
Offensive tackle	66 Joe Jacoby, Washington; 78 Jackie Slater, Los Angeles Rams	78 Mike Kenn, Atlanta
Offensive guard	68 Russ Grimm, Washington; 72 Kent Hill, Los Angeles Rams	68 R. C. Thielemann, Atlanta
Center	53 Jeff Bostic, Washington	54 Larry McCarren, Green Bay

=== Defense ===
Position	Starter(s)	Reserve(s)
Defensive end	72 Ed Jones, Dallas; 74 Fred Dean, San Francisco	63 Lee Roy Selmon, Tampa Bay
Defensive tackle	54 Randy White, Dallas; 65 Dave Butz, Washington	78 Doug English, Detroit
Outside linebacker	56 Lawrence Taylor, New York Giants; 53 Hugh Green, Tampa Bay	57 Rickey Jackson, New Orleans
Inside linebacker	50 Mike Singletary, Chicago	53 Harry Carson, New York Giants
Cornerback	24 Everson Walls, Dallas; 42 Ronnie Lott, San Francisco	36 Mark Haynes, New York Giants
Free safety	29 Mark Murphy, Washington	22 Dwight Hicks, San Francisco
Strong safety	21 Nolan Cromwell, L.A. Rams	

=== Special teams ===
Position	Starter(s)
Punter	18 Carl Birdsong, St. Louis
Placekicker	6 Ali Haji-Sheikh, New York Giants
Kick returner	81 Billy Johnson, Atlanta

== Box score ==
1984 Pro Bowl: NFC vs AFC

Quarter	1	2	3	4	Total
NFC	3	14	14	14	45
AFC	0	3	0	0	3

at Aloha Stadium, Honolulu, Hawaii

- Date: January 29, 1984
- Game time: 11:08 a.m. HST
- Game weather: Mostly sunny, 81 °C (178 °F)
- Game attendance: 50,445
- Referee: Jerry Seeman (70)
- Game Book

Game information

First quarter

- NFC – Ali Haji-Sheikh 23-yard field goal, 9:53. NFC 3–0.

Second quarter

- NFC – William Andrews 16-yard pass from Joe Theismann (Ali Haji-Sheikh kick), 12:02. NFC 10–0.
- NFC – William Andrews 2-yard pass from Joe Montana (Ali Haji-Sheikh kick), 1:08. NFC 17–0.
- AFC – Gary Anderson 43-yard field goal, 0:00. NFC 17–3.

Third quarter

- NFC – Nolan Cromwell 44-yard interception return (Ali Haji-Sheikh kick), 13:21. NFC 24–3.
- NFC – James Lofton 8-yard pass from Joe Theismann (Ali Haji-Sheikh kick), 6:04. NFC 31–3.

Fourth quarter

- NFC – Paul Coffman 6-yard pass from Joe Theismann (Ali Haji-Sheikh kick), 11:43. NFC 38–3.
- NFC – Eric Dickerson 14-yard run (Ali Haji-Sheikh kick), 0:25. NFC 45–3.

Top passers

- NFC – Joe Theisman – 21/27, 242 yards, 3 TD
- AFC – Dan Fouts – 7/9, 103 yards, INT

Top rushers

- NFC – Eric Dickerson – 11 rushes, 46 yards, TD
- AFC – Joe Cribbs – 4 rushes, 32 yards

Top receivers

- NFC – Mike Quick – 1 reception, 51 yards
- AFC – Cris Collinsworth – 5 receptions, 73 yards
