= 1983 NFL season =

American football season

Regular season
- Duration: September 3 – December 19, 1983

Playoffs
- Start date: December 24, 1983
- AFC Champions: Los Angeles Raiders
- NFC Champions: Washington Redskins

Super Bowl XVIII
- Date: January 22, 1984
- Site: Tampa Stadium, Tampa, Florida
- Champions: Los Angeles Raiders

Pro Bowl
- Date: January 29, 1984
- Site: Aloha Stadium

AFC teams: West, Central, East
NFC teams: West, Central, East

The 1983 NFL season was the 64th regular season of the National Football League. The Colts played their final season in Baltimore before the team's relocation to Indianapolis the following season. The season ended with Super Bowl XVIII when the Los Angeles Raiders defeated the Washington Redskins 38–9 at Tampa Stadium in Florida.

== Player movement ==
=== Trades ===
- May 2, 1983: The Baltimore Colts traded John Elway for Chris Hinton, backup quarterback Mark Herrmann, and a first-round pick in the 1984 draft, which turned into offensive lineman Ron Solt.

=== Retirements ===
- January 11, 1983: Wide receiver and four-time Super Bowl champion Lynn Swann retires.

=== Draft ===
The 1983 NFL draft was held from April 26 to 27, 1983, at New York City's Sheraton Hotel. With the first pick, the Baltimore Colts selected quarterback John Elway from Stanford University.

== Major rule changes ==
- In the last 30 seconds of a half (but not overtime), with the defensive team behind with no more time outs, a defensive foul cannot prevent the half from ending except for the normal options that are available to the offensive team.
- Pass interference will not be called if there was incidental contact, or if players make simultaneous attempts to catch, tip, block, or bat the ball.
- Players may not use a helmet, that is no longer worn by anyone, as a weapon to strike or hit an opponent; they risk disqualification if they do. This rule was instituted after Raiders defensive end Lyle Alzado swung a helmet at New York Jets tackle Chris Ward during a playoff game the previous season.
- As a result of the Snowplow Game, snow removal equipment is prohibited from being used during the game.

== 1983 deaths ==
- May 2, 1983: Norm Van Brocklin age 57. Quarterback for the Los Angeles Rams and Philadelphia Eagles. Served as head coach for the Minnesota Vikings and Atlanta Falcons. Elected to the Pro Football Hall Of Fame in 1971.
- June 25, 1983: Larry Gordon, the Miami Dolphins first round pick in the 1976 NFL draft, died from heart failure.
- October 31, 1983: George Halas, the owner of the Chicago Bears dies of cancer at the age of 88 years old.
- December 16, 1983: Doug Kotar, Running Back for the New York Giants, died from an inoperable brain tumor.
- December 25, 1983: Ray Douglas, official since 1968 (back judge)

== Division races ==
From 1978 to 1981 and this season to 1989, ten teams qualified for the playoffs: the winners of each of the divisions, and two wild-card teams in each conference. The two wild cards would meet for the right to face whichever of the three division winners had the best overall record. The tiebreaker rules were based on head-to-head competition, followed by division records, common opponents records, and conference play.

=== National Football Conference ===
Week	East		Central		West		Wild Card		Wild Card	
1	Dallas, Philadelphia	1–0	3 teams	1–0	3 teams	1–0				
2	Dallas	2–0	4 teams	1–1	L.A. Rams	2–0				
3	Dallas	3–0	Minnesota, Green Bay	2–1	4 teams	2–1				
4	Dallas	4–0	Minnesota	3–1	San Francisco	3–1	Washington	3–1	6 teams	2–2
5	Dallas	5–0	Minnesota, Green Bay	3–2	San Francisco	4–1	Washington	4–1	5 teams	3–2
6	Dallas	6–0	Minnesota	4–2	3 teams	4–2	Washington	5–1	4 teams	4–2
7	Dallas	7–0	Minnesota	5–2	San Francisco, L.A. Rams	5–2	3 teams	5–2	3 teams	4–3
8	Dallas	7–1	Minnesota	6–2	San Francisco	6–2	Washington	6–2	New Orleans, L.A. Rams	5–3
9	Dallas	8–1	Minnesota	6–3	San Francisco	6–3	Washington	7–2	New Orleans, L.A. Rams	5–4
10	Dallas	9–1	Minnesota	6–4	3 teams	6–4	Washington	8–2	3 teams	6–4
11	Dallas, Washington	9–2	Minnesota, Green Bay	6–5	San Francisco, L.A. Rams	7–4	Dallas, Washington	9–2	San Francisco, L.A. Rams	7–4
12	Dallas, Washington	10–2	Minnesota	7–5	San Francisco, L.A. Rams	7–5	Dallas, Washington	10–2	San Francisco, L.A. Rams	7–5
13	Dallas, Washington	11–2	Minnesota, Detroit	7–6	L.A. Rams	8–5	Dallas, Washington	11–2	Minnesota, Detroit	7–6
14	Dallas, Washington	12–2	Detroit	8–6	San Francisco, L.A. Rams	8–6	Dallas, Washington	12–2	San Francisco, L.A. Rams	8–6
15	Washington	13–2	Detroit, Green Bay	8–7	San Francisco	9–6	Dallas	12–3	4 teams	8–7
16	Washington	14–2	Detroit	9–7	San Francisco	10–6	Dallas	12–4	L.A. Rams	9–7

=== American Football Conference ===
Week	East		Central		West		Wild Card		Wild Card	
1	3 teams	1–0	4 teams	0–1	3 teams	1–0				
2	Miami	2–0	Pittsburgh, Cleveland	1–1	L.A. Raiders, Denver	2–0				
3	Miami, Buffalo	2–1	Pittsburgh, Cleveland	2–1	L.A. Raiders	3–0	6 teams	2–1		
4	Miami, Buffalo	3–1	Cleveland	3–1	L.A. Raiders	4–0	3 teams	3–1	6 teams	2–2
5	4 teams	3–2	Pittsburgh, Cleveland	3–2	L.A. Raiders	4–1	7 teams	3–2	4 teams	2–3
6	Buffalo, Baltimore	4–2	Pittsburgh, Cleveland	4–2	L.A. Raiders	5–1	4 teams	4–2	5 teams	3–3
7	Buffalo	5–2	Pittsburgh	5–2	L.A. Raiders	5–2	Miami, Baltimore	4–3	Cleveland, Seattle	4–3
8	Miami, Buffalo	5–3	Pittsburgh	6–2	L.A. Raiders	6–2	Miami, Buffalo	5–3	Denver	5–3
9	Miami, Buffalo	6–3	Pittsburgh	7–2	L.A. Raiders, Denver	6–3	Miami, Buffalo	6–3	L.A. Raiders, Denver	6–3
10	Miami	7–3	Pittsburgh	8–2	L.A. Raiders	7–3	Buffalo, Baltimore	6–4	Seattle, Denver	6–4
11	Miami, Buffalo	7–4	Pittsburgh	9–2	L.A. Raiders	8–3	Miami, Buffalo	7–4	5 teams	6–5
12	Miami	8–4	Pittsburgh	9–3	L.A. Raiders	9–3	3 teams	7–5	3 teams	6–5
13	Miami	9–4	Pittsburgh	9–4	L.A. Raiders	10–3	Cleveland	8–5	3 teams	7–6
14	Miami	10–4	Pittsburgh	9–5	L.A. Raiders	11–3	3 teams	8–6	4 teams	7–7
15	Miami	11–4	Pittsburgh	10–5	L.A. Raiders	11–4	Denver	9–6	4 teams	8–7
16	Miami	12–4	Pittsburgh	10–6	L.A. Raiders	12–4	Seattle	9–7	Denver	9–7

== Regular season ==
=== Scheduling formula ===
Inter-conference
AFC East vs NFC West
AFC Central vs NFC Central
AFC West vs NFC East

Highlights of the 1983 season included:

- Thanksgiving: Two games were played on Thursday, November 24, featuring Pittsburgh at Detroit and St. Louis at Dallas, with Detroit and Dallas winning.

=== Final standings ===
AFC East
	W	L	T	PCT	DIV	CONF	PF	PA	STK
^{(2)} Miami Dolphins	12	4	0	.750	6–2	9–3	389	250	W5
New England Patriots	8	8	0	.500	4–4	6–6	274	289	L1
Buffalo Bills	8	8	0	.500	4–4	7–5	283	351	L2
Baltimore Colts	7	9	0	.438	3–5	5–9	264	354	W1
New York Jets	7	9	0	.438	3–5	4–8	313	331	L2

AFC Central
	W	L	T	PCT	DIV	CONF	PF	PA	STK
^{(3)} Pittsburgh Steelers	10	6	0	.625	4–2	8–4	355	303	L1
Cleveland Browns	9	7	0	.563	3–3	7–5	356	342	W1
Cincinnati Bengals	7	9	0	.438	4–2	4–8	346	302	L1
Houston Oilers	2	14	0	.125	1–5	1–11	288	460	L1

AFC West
	W	L	T	PCT	DIV	CONF	PF	PA	STK
^{(1)} Los Angeles Raiders	12	4	0	.750	6–2	10–2	442	338	W1
^{(4)} Seattle Seahawks	9	7	0	.563	5–3	8–4	403	397	W2
^{(5)} Denver Broncos	9	7	0	.563	3–5	9–5	302	327	L1
San Diego Chargers	6	10	0	.375	4–4	4–8	358	462	L1
Kansas City Chiefs	6	10	0	.375	2–6	4–8	386	367	W1

NFC East
	W	L	T	PCT	DIV	CONF	PF	PA	STK
^{(1)} Washington Redskins	14	2	0	.875	7–1	10–2	541	332	W9
^{(4)} Dallas Cowboys	12	4	0	.750	7–1	10–2	479	360	L2
St. Louis Cardinals	8	7	1	.531	3–4–1	5–6–1	374	428	W3
Philadelphia Eagles	5	11	0	.313	1–7	4–10	233	322	L2
New York Giants	3	12	1	.219	1–6–1	3–8–1	267	347	L4

NFC Central
	W	L	T	PCT	DIV	CONF	PF	PA	STK
^{(3)} Detroit Lions	9	7	0	.563	7–1	8–4	347	286	W1
Green Bay Packers	8	8	0	.500	4–4	6–6	429	439	L1
Chicago Bears	8	8	0	.500	4–4	7–7	311	301	W2
Minnesota Vikings	8	8	0	.500	4–4	4–8	316	348	W1
Tampa Bay Buccaneers	2	14	0	.125	1–7	1–11	241	380	L3

NFC West
	W	L	T	PCT	DIV	CONF	PF	PA	STK
^{(2)} San Francisco 49ers	10	6	0	.625	4–2	8–4	432	293	W3
^{(5)} Los Angeles Rams	9	7	0	.563	5–1	8–4	361	344	W1
New Orleans Saints	8	8	0	.500	2–4	7–5	319	337	L1
Atlanta Falcons	7	9	0	.438	1–5	4–8	370	389	W1

=== Tiebreakers ===
- Los Angeles Raiders was the first AFC seed over Miami based on head-to-head victory (1–0).
- Seattle was the first AFC Wild Card ahead of Denver based on better division record (5–3 to Broncos' 3–5) after Cleveland was eliminated from the three-way tie based on head-to-head record (Seattle and Denver 2–1 to Browns' 0–2).
- New England finished ahead of Buffalo in the AFC East based on head-to-head sweep (2–0).
- Baltimore finished ahead of N.Y. Jets in the AFC East based on better conference record (5–9, .357 to Jets' 4–8, .333).
- San Diego finished ahead of Kansas City in the AFC West based on head-to-head sweep (2–0).
- Minnesota ended up in fourth place in the NFC Central after being eliminated from the three-way tie based on conference record (Chicago 7–7 and Green Bay 6–6 to Vikings' 4–8).
- Green Bay finished ahead of Chicago in the NFC Central based on better record against common opponents (4–4 to Bears' 3–5).

== Playoffs ==
Note: The Los Angeles Raiders (the AFC 1 seed) did not play the Seattle Seahawks (the 4 seed) in the Divisional playoff round because both teams were in the same division.

Dec 31 – Candlestick Park
3	Detroit	23
Dec 26 – Texas Stadium	Jan 8 – RFK Stadium
2	San Francisco	24
NFC
5	LA Rams	24	2	San Francisco	21
Jan 1 – RFK Stadium
4	Dallas	17	1	Washington	24
NFC Championship
5	LA Rams	7
Jan 22 – Tampa Stadium
1	Washington	51
Divisional round
Wild-card round	N1	Washington	9
Dec 31 – Miami Orange Bowl
A1	LA Raiders	38
Super Bowl XVIII
4	Seattle	27
Dec 24 – Kingdome	Jan 8 – Los Angeles Memorial Coliseum
2*	Miami	20
AFC
5	Denver	7	4	Seattle	14
Jan 1 – Los Angeles Memorial Coliseum
4	Seattle	31	1	LA Raiders	30
AFC Championship
3	Pittsburgh	10
1*	LA Raiders	38

== Notable events ==
- Kansas City Chiefs running back Joe Delaney dies after attempting to rescue three boys who were drowning in a makeshift swimming pool at a construction site in Monroe, Louisiana.
- The Raiders' Super Bowl win would be the AFC's last win until the 1997 season when the Denver Broncos defeated the Green Bay Packers.

== Milestones ==
The following players set all-time records during the season:

Most touchdowns, season	John Riggins, Washington (24)
Most rushing touchdowns, season	John Riggins, Washington (24)
Most punt return yards, season	Greg Pruitt, Los Angeles Raiders (666)
Most total field goals made, season	Ali Haji-Sheikh, New York Giants (35)

== Statistical leaders ==
=== Team ===
Points scored	Washington Redskins (541)
Total yards gained	San Diego Chargers (6,197)
Yards rushing	Chicago Bears (2,727)
Yards passing	San Diego Chargers (4,661)
Fewest points allowed	Miami Dolphins (250)
Fewest total yards allowed	Cincinnati Bengals (4,327)
Fewest rushing yards allowed	Washington Redskins (1,289)
Fewest passing yards allowed	New Orleans Saints (2,691)

== Awards ==
Most Valuable Player	Joe Theismann, quarterback, Washington
Coach of the Year	Joe Gibbs, Washington
Offensive Player of the Year	Joe Theismann, quarterback, Washington
Defensive Player of the Year	Doug Betters, defensive end, Miami
Offensive Rookie of the Year	Eric Dickerson, running back, LA Rams
Defensive Rookie of the Year	Vernon Maxwell, linebacker, Baltimore Colts
Man of the Year	Rolf Benirschke, placekicker, San Diego
Comeback Player of the Year	Billy Johnson, wide receiver, Atlanta
Super Bowl Most Valuable Player	Marcus Allen, running back, LA Raiders

== Coaching changes ==
=== Offseason ===
- Atlanta Falcons: Dan Henning replaced the fired Leeman Bennett.
- Buffalo Bills: Kay Stephenson replaced Chuck Knox, who left the team to join the Seattle Seahawks.
- Kansas City Chiefs: Marv Levy was fired and replaced by John Mackovic.
- New York Giants: Ray Perkins was replaced by Bill Parcells.
- New York Jets: Walt Michaels resigned and was replaced by Joe Walton.
- Los Angeles Rams: Ray Malavasi was fired and replaced by John Robinson.
- Philadelphia Eagles: Dick Vermeil resigned and was replaced by Marion Campbell.
- Seattle Seahawks: Chuck Knox joined the Seahawks after resigning from the Bills. Seattle had fired Jack Patera after the team lost their first two games in 1982. Mike McCormack, the team's director of football operations, took over as interim for the remainder of that season.

=== In-season ===
- Houston Oilers: Ed Biles was fired after the team lost their first six games. Defensive coordinator Chuck Studley took over as interim.

== Stadium changes ==
Schaefer Stadium is renamed Sullivan Stadium after New England Patriots founder and owner Billy Sullivan

== Uniform changes ==
- The New Orleans Saints' jersey numbers were slightly modified, adding a thin inner border which matched the jersey color between the gold outer border and the number itself, similar to the numbers on the San Diego Chargers' jerseys.
- The Seattle Seahawks revised their jerseys for the first time since joining the NFL in 1976. The new jerseys moved the TV numbers from the sleeves to the shoulders, with the helmet logo duplicated on the sleeves and the jersey collars gaining striping trim; the socks also became solid blue. The face masks also changed from gray to blue.
- The Washington Redskins reversed their helmet logo modification of 1982, when the feathers hanging from the portrait of the Native American were curved instead of straight, which they were from 1972-81. Washington kept the 1972 logo until retiring the Redskins nickname and all Native American imagery prior to the 2020 season.

== Television ==
This was the second year under the league's five-year broadcast contracts with ABC, CBS, and NBC to televise Monday Night Football, the NFC package, and the AFC package, respectively.

O. J. Simpson replaced Fran Tarkenton as ABC's fill-in color commentator. Howard Cosell then ignited racial controversy during the broadcast of the September 5 MNF game between the Dallas Cowboys and Washington Redskins when his commentary on Alvin Garrett, an African American wide receiver for Washington, included a reference to "That little monkey". The fallout contributed to Cosell's decision to leave MNF after the season; his final telecast was a special Friday night game between the Jets and Dolphins on December 16.

=== Regular season game not broadcast by Network TV ===
Date	Time	Teams	Local TV	Announcers
October 9, 1983	3:00 PM CDT	Kansas City Chiefs @ Los Angeles Raiders	KCTV-TV (Kansas City area) (blacked out in Los Angeles area)	Don Fortune (play-by-play); Len Dawson (analyst)
