= Harry Gamble =

American football coach and executive

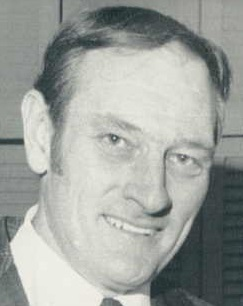
- Gamble in 1973

Personal information
- Born: December 26, 1930; Pitman, New Jersey, U.S.
- Died: January 28, 2014 (aged 83)

Career information
- College: Rider University, Temple University

Career history

Coaching
- Clayton HS (NJ) (1954−1957) Head coach; Audubon HS (NJ) (1958−1961) Head coach; Penn (1962−1966) Line coach; Lafayette (1967−1970) Head coach; Penn (1971−1980) Head coach; Philadelphia Eagles (1981) Volunteer assistant; Philadelphia Eagles (1982) Special teams coach & tights ends coach

Operations
- Philadelphia Eagles (1983) Administrative assistant of coaching and personnel; Philadelphia Eagles (1984) Director of football operations; Philadelphia Eagles (1985) General manager; Philadelphia Eagles (1986−1994) President & general manager; National Football League (1995−1998) Director of football operations

Head coaching record
- Regular season: NCAA: 35–55–2 (.391)
- Coaching profile at Pro Football Reference

Harry T. Gamble (December 26, 1930 – January 28, 2014) was an American football coach and executive. He was the head coach at the Lafayette College and University of Pennsylvania and general manager of the Philadelphia Eagles.

== Early life and career ==
Gamble was born and raised in Pitman, New Jersey. He graduated from Rider College, where he played offensive line. He later earned a master's degree and doctorate in education from Temple University. He served in the United States Army and was a player/coach at Fort Meade in 1953. He then served as head football coach at Clayton High School and Audubon High School and was named South Jersey Coach of the Year in 1960. In 1962 he joined the college ranks as the Penn Quakers' line coach.

== College coaching ==
He was the head coach of the Lafayette Leopards from 1967 to 1970, compiling a 21−19 record. He then served as the head coach at Penn from 1971 to 1980, earning a 34−55−2 record. After the 1980 season, the school demanded he make changes to his coaching staff. Gamble refused and was fired. He was hired by the Philadelphia Eagles of the National Football League (NFL) in 1981 as an unpaid assistant coach (he was still being paid by Penn) under Dick Vermeil. In 1982 he served as the Eagles' tight ends and special teams coach and also held administrative duties.

== Executive ==
In 1983, Marion Campbell replaced Vermeil as head coach and general manager Jim Murray was fired. Eagles' vice president Susan Tose Spencer gave Gamble the opportunity of move to the front office. Gamble, who served as administrative assistant for coaching and player personnel in 1983 and director of football administration in 1984, took over many of Murray's duties and was promoted to general manager in 1985. He was the first person with a football background to serve as general manager since Pete Retzlaff in 1972. When Norman Braman purchased the team a couple of months later, Gamble was given the additional title of vice president. The following year, Gamble was promoted to president and chief operating officer – his third major promotion in 17 months and sixth in five years. Under Gamble, the Eagles became one of the most profitable organizations in sports and from 1988 to 1993 was one of the winningest franchises in the NFL; however, they were unable to reach the Super Bowl. When Jeffrey Lurie purchased the team in 1994, Gamble was kept on but was not part of Lurie's inner circle. He resigned on March 30, 1995, and became the National Football League's director of football operations. He retired in 1998.

== Later life ==
Gamble spent his retirement as a league ambassador to Russia. He resided in Haddonfield, New Jersey, with wife Joan. One of his sons, Tom, was also an NFL executive. Gamble died on January 28, 2014, at the age of 83.

== Head coaching record ==
=== College ===
Year	Team	Overall	Conference	Standing	Bowl/playoffs
Lafayette Leopards (Middle Three Conference) (1967–1970)
1967	Lafayette	4–5	1–1	2nd	
1968	Lafayette	7–3	0–2	3rd	
1969	Lafayette	4–6	0–2	3rd	
1970	Lafayette	6–5	1–1	T–1st	
Lafayette:		21–19	2–6		
Penn Quakers (Ivy League) (1971–1980)
1971	Penn	2–7	1–6	7th	
1972	Penn	6–3	4–3	T–3rd	
1973	Penn	6–3	5–2	T–2nd	
1974	Penn	6–2–1	4–2–1	3rd	
1975	Penn	3–6	2–5	T–6th	
1976	Penn	3–6	2–5	T–5th	
1977	Penn	5–4	4–3	T–3rd	
1978	Penn	2–6–1	1–5–1	8th	
1979	Penn	0–9	0–7	8th	
1980	Penn	1–9	1–6	7th	
Penn:		34–55–2	24–44–2		
Total:		55–74–2			
National championship Conference title Conference division title or championship game berth
