= Fred Hill (American football) =

American football player (born 1943)

- Hill in 1972

No. 86
- Positions: Tight end, Wide receiver

Personal information
- Born: August 13, 1943 (age 83); Paramount, California, U.S.
- Listed height: 6 ft 2 in (1.88 m)
- Listed weight: 215 lb (98 kg)

Career information
- High school: Paramount
- College: USC
- NFL draft: 1965: 4th round, 48th overall pick
- AFL draft: 1965: 16th round, 123rd overall pick

Career history
- Philadelphia Eagles (1965–1971)

Awards and highlights
- National champion (1962); Second-team All-American (1964)

Career NFL statistics
- Receptions: 85
- Receiving yards: 1,005
- Touchdowns: 5
- Stats at Pro Football Reference

Frederick Gordon Hill (born August 13, 1943) is an American former professional football player in the National Football League (NFL). He played college football for the USC Trojans.

== College career ==
Hill played college football at the University of Southern California (USC).

== Professional career ==
Hill was selected by the Philadelphia Eagles in the 1965 NFL draft and the Oakland Raiders in the 1965 AFL draft. He chose to join the Eagles, with whom he played at tight end and wide receiver from 1965 through 1971.

== Personal life ==
In 1971, his three-year-old daughter Kim (August 11, 1966 – March 5, 2011) was diagnosed with leukemia. His teammates, general manager Jim Murray, and team owner Leonard Tose rallied around the family. In the aftermath of her successful treatment, the team in 1972 initiated the Eagles Fly for Leukemia philanthropic program, and Hill, Murray, and teammates co-founded the very first Ronald McDonald House, which opened in Philadelphia in 1974. Kim Hill died in 2011.

Hill was also active in the Fellowship of Christian Athletes.

Hill owns several McDonald's franchises in south Orange County, California.
