= History of the Philadelphia Eagles =

The History of the Philadelphia Eagles begins when the franchise was founded in 1933. Since the team's establishment, the Eagles have appeared in five Super Bowls, losing their first two appearances, Super Bowl XV (1981) and XXXIX (2005) as well as their fourth, Super Bowl LVII (2022), and winning their third, Super Bowl LII (2017), and fifth, Super Bowl LIX (2024). The Eagles have won three out of the four NFL championships (won pre-1966, before the AFL–NFL merger) that they have appeared in, with the first three appearances being sequential.

The early years of the Eagles history from 1933 to 1939 were influenced by its owner and coach, Bert Bell. After Bell sold the team to Alexis Thompson in 1940, the second era of the Eagles was largely directed by their coach and future Hall of Famer, Greasy Neale.

== Beginnings (1933–1943) ==
=== Formation and early years ===
In 1931, Philadelphia's NFL franchise, the Frankford Yellow Jackets, NFL champions of 1926, went bankrupt and ceased operations midway through the season. After more than a year searching for a suitable replacement, the NFL granted an expansion franchise to a syndicate headed by former University of Pennsylvania teammates Lud Wray and Bert Bell.

In exchange for an entry fee of $2,500 ($51,570 in 2024), the Bell-Wray group was awarded the assets of the failed Yellow Jackets organization. Inspired by the National Recovery Act's "Blue Eagle" symbol, part of President Franklin D. Roosevelt's New Deal, they named the new team the Philadelphia Eagles. Bell became president and general manager, while Wray was appointed head coach. Although this makes it appear that the Yellow Jackets sat out the 1932 season and returned in 1933 as the Eagles, this is not the case. The Eagles do not claim the Yellow Jackets' history as their own, and the NFL officially regard the two franchises as separate, citing the aforementioned period of dormancy. The Eagles simply inherited the NFL rights to the Philadelphia area. Further, Wray and Bell when assembled an almost entirely new team, only a single player (Art Koeninger) came from the 1931 Yellow Jackets.

The new team played its first game on October 15, 1933, against the New York Giants at the Polo Grounds in New York City, which they lost 56-0. The Eagles mainly struggled over the course of their first decade. With rosters made up mostly of former Penn, Temple, and Villanova players who only put in a few years before getting on with their lives, the Eagles never won more than four games in their first ten seasons.

In 1935, Bell proposed an annual college draft to equalize talent across a league that had been dominated by the Chicago Bears, Green Bay Packers and New York Giants. Between 1927 through 1934, the Bears, Packers and Giants had won all but one title (the lone exception being the Providence Steam Roller of 1928). The draft was a revolutionary concept in professional sports, in which teams select players in inverse order of their finish in the standings, a practice still followed today, strove to increase fan interest by guaranteeing that all the teams will have the opportunity for the best college talent.

=== Sole owner and coach Bell (1936–1939) ===
Having finished last in the standings, the Eagles had the first pick in the 1936 draft, an opportunity they used to select the University of Chicago's Heisman Trophy-winning back, Jay Berwanger. They then traded his rights to the Chicago Bears. However, Berwanger had no interest in playing professional football and elected to go to medical school instead.

The Eagles' first major recruiting success would come in 1939, with the signing of TCU's All-American quarterback, Davey O'Brien; O'Brien proceeded to shatter numerous existing single-season NFL passing records in his rookie season. That year, the Eagles participated in the first televised football game, against the football Brooklyn Dodgers, at Ebbets Field in a 23-14 loss.

=== Steelers and Eagles move (1940–1942) ===
In 1940, the team moved from Philadelphia Municipal Stadium to Shibe Park. Wray sold his half-interest in the team to Art Rooney, who had just sold the Pittsburgh Steelers to Alexis Thompson. Soon thereafter, Bell/Rooney and Thompson swapped franchises, but not teams. In a move known as the "Pennsylvania Polka," Bell/Rooney's entire Eagles' corporate organization, including most of the players, moved to Pittsburgh, while Thompson's team (briefly renamed the Iron Men) moved to Philadelphia, leaving only the team nicknames in their original cities (for instance, the Steelers' corporate name remained "Philadelphia Football Club, Inc." until 1945). Since NFL franchises are territorial rights distinct from individual corporate entities, the NFL does not consider this a franchise move and considers the Eagles as a single unbroken entity from 1933. After assuming ownership, Thompson promptly hired Greasy Neale as the team's head coach.

=== The Steagles (1943) ===
In 1943, shortages of players occurred due to many players being recruited to join the war effort in World War II. To address the shortage of players, the Eagles temporarily merged with the Pittsburgh Steelers. This created a team unofficially known as, "The Steagles". In the lone year of the merger, the Steagles went 5-4-1. The merger was then dissolved after the season ended.

== Early success (1944–1949) ==
In 1944, the Eagles selected Hall of Fame running back Steve Van Buren. Led by Van Buren and Neale, the Eagles became a competitor for the first time. They had their first winning season as a separate team in 1944. After two more second-place finishes (in 1945 and 1946), the Eagles reached the NFL title game for the first time in 1947. However, the team fell to the Chicago Cardinals 28–21 at Chicago's Comiskey Park. The Eagles returned to face the Cardinals once more in the 1948 championship where they won 7–0. Then the Eagles returned to the NFL championship game for the third consecutive year and won against the Los Angeles Rams 14–0. In 1948, the Eagles won 3 of 8 games with a score of 45–0, and all in a 36-day span.

In Thompson's final draft, Chuck Bednarik was selected as the first overall pick in the 1949 NFL draft. An All-American lineman/linebacker from the University of Pennsylvania, Bednarik would go on to become one of the greatest and most beloved players in Eagles history. The 1949 season also saw the sale of the team by Thompson to a syndicate of 100 buyers, known as the "Happy Hundred", each of whom paid a fee of $3,000 for their share of the team. While the leader of the "Happy Hundred" was noted Philadelphia businessman James P. Clark, one other investor was Leonard Tose, who then became the owner.

== Flip-flopping fortunes and the Van Brocklin era (1950–1959) ==
With the turn of the decade came another turn in team fortunes. The Eagles were slated to open the 1950 season against the AAFC champion Cleveland Browns, who had just joined the NFL. The Eagles were expected to make short work of the Browns, who were widely reckoned at the time as the dominant team in a lesser league. However, the Browns lit up the Eagles' vaunted defense for 487 total yards, including 246 passing yards, in a 35–10 rout. The Eagles never recovered, and they finished 6–6.

Neale retired after the season and was replaced by Bo McMillin. Two games into the season, McMillin was forced to retire due to terminal stomach cancer. Wayne Millner finished out the season before being replaced by Jim Trimble. While the remnants of the great 1940s teams managed to stay competitive for the first few years of the decade, and while younger players like Bobby Walston and Sonny Jurgensen occasionally provided talent, the team was mediocre for most of the 1950s. The Eagles considered trying to purchase Temple Stadium in 1952 when the team was unhappy with their lease at Shibe Park. Temple University claimed the property to have been appraised for $1 million and said they were uninterested in selling. In 1958, however, the franchise took key steps to improve, hiring Buck Shaw as head coach and acquiring Norm Van Brocklin in a trade with the Los Angeles Rams. That year also saw the team move from Connie Mack Stadium (formerly Shibe Park) to Franklin Field, in which attendance doubled. The 1959 squad finished in second place in the Eastern Division that year.

== From champions to celler dwellers (1960–1969) ==
=== 1960 ===
1960 remains the most celebrated year in Eagles history. Shaw, Van Brocklin and Chuck Bednarik (each in his last season before retirement) led a team more notable for its grit than its talent (one observer later quipped that the team had "nothing but a championship") to its first division title since 1949. The team was aided by their two Pro Bowl receivers, WR Tommy McDonald (who would later pen a short autobiography titled "They Pay Me to Catch Footballs") and TE Pete Retzlaff. On December 26, 1960, one of the coldest days in recorded Philadelphia history, the Eagles faced Vince Lombardi's Green Bay Packers in the NFL title game and dealt the mighty Lombardi the sole championship game loss of his storied career. Bednarik lined up at center on offense and at linebacker on defense. Poetically, the game ended as Bednarik tackled a struggling Jim Taylor and refused to allow him to stand until the last seconds had ticked away.

=== Bedlam in Philadelphia (1961–1969) ===
In 1961, the Eagles finished just a half-game behind the New York Giants for first place in the Eastern Conference standings with a 10–4 record. Despite the on-field success, the franchise was in turmoil; Van Brocklin had come to Philadelphia and agreed to play through 1960 with the tacit understanding that, upon his retirement as a player, he would succeed Shaw as head coach. Ownership, however, opted to promote assistant Nick Skorich instead, and Van Brocklin quit the organization in annoyance, instead becoming head coach of the new Minnesota Vikings. In 1962, the team was decimated by injury, managed only three wins and were blown out at home 49–0 by the Packers. The off-field chaos would continue through 1963, as the remaining 65 shareholders out of the original Happy Hundred sold the team to Jerry Wolman, a 36-year-old millionaire Washington developer who outbid local bidders for the team, paying an unprecedented $5.505 million for control of the club. In 1964, Wolman hired former Cardinals and Washington Redskins coach Joe Kuharich to a 15-year contract.

Kuharich was heavily criticized as a coach for wasting top-tier talent such as that of Jurgensen, Timmy Brown, Ollie Matson and Ben Hawkins and effectively running the franchise into the ground. At Kuharich's insistence, Jurgensen was traded to the Washington Redskins for Norm Snead in 1964: Jurgensen would go on to a Hall of Fame career while Snead, though serviceable, lacked the talent to lift the team out of mediocrity. By 1968, fans were in full revolt, and chants of "Joe must go" echoed through the increasingly empty bleachers of Franklin Field. Adding insult to injury, the Eagles managed to eke out meaningless wins in two of the last three games of the season, costing the franchise the first pick in the draft, and with it the opportunity to add O. J. Simpson to the roster. (With the second pick, the Eagles chose Leroy Keyes, who played only four years in an Eagles uniform.) The last game of 1968, the Philadelphia Eagles Santa Claus incident, played on December 15, helped cement the rowdy reputation of Philadelphia fans when some of them booed and threw snowballs at a fellow Eagles fan playing as Santa Claus. By 1969, Wolman had lost most of his fortune and was bankrupt, leaving the franchise under the administration of a federal bankruptcy court. At the end of the bankruptcy proceedings, the Eagles were sold to Leonard Tose, a self-made trucking millionaire and original member of the Happy Hundred. Tose's first official act was to fire Kuharich.

Tose infused the organization with some much-needed confidence. Initially, however, he ran the team with more enthusiasm than ability, as was exemplified by his replacement for Kuharich, the hapless Jerry Williams. Tose also selected former Eagles great Pete Retzlaff as general manager.

== From hopeless to hopeful (1970–1979) ==
In 1971, the Eagles moved from Franklin Field to brand-new Veterans Stadium. In its first season, the "Vet" was widely acclaimed as a triumph of ultra-modern sports engineering, a consensus that would be short-lived. Equally short-lived was Williams's tenure as head coach: after a 3–10–1 record in 1970 and three consecutive blowout losses to Cincinnati, Dallas and San Francisco to open the 1971 season, Williams was fired and replaced by assistant Ed Khayat, a defensive lineman on the Eagles' 1960 NFL championship team. Williams and Khayat were hampered by Retzlaff's decision to trade longtime starting quarterback Norm Snead to the Minnesota Vikings in early 1971, leaving the Eagles a choice between journeyman Pete Liske and the raw Rick Arrington.

Khayat lost his first two games, but won six of the final nine in 1971 thanks to the exploits of the defense, led by All-Pro safety Bill Bradley, who led the NFL in interceptions (11) and interception return yardage (248).

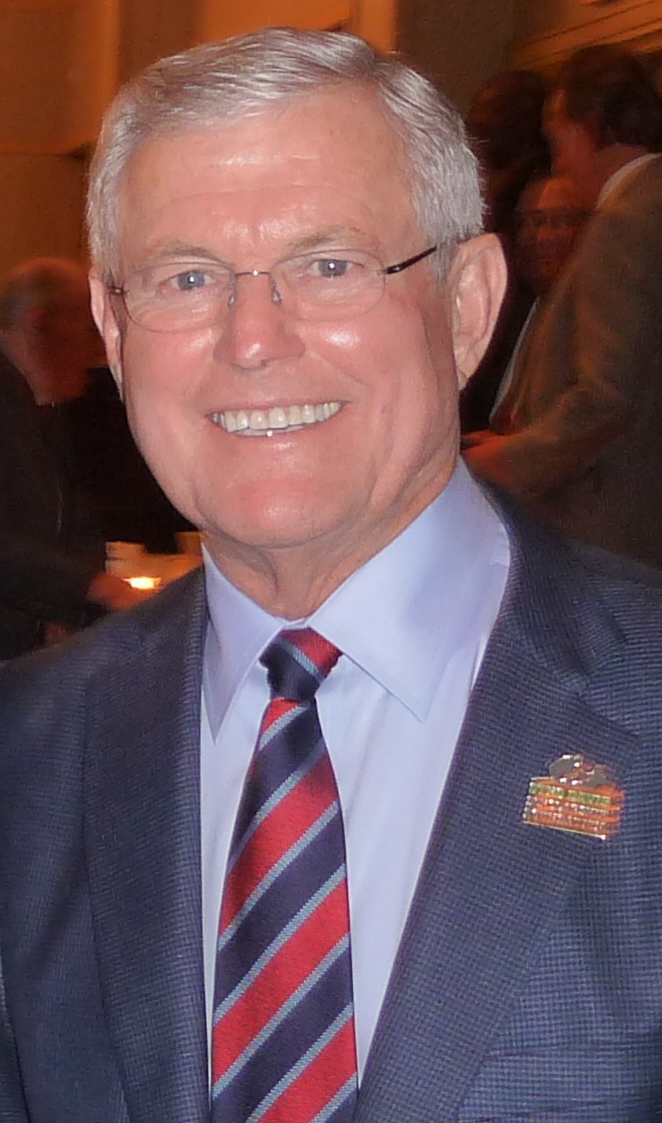
Dick Vermeil brought the Eagles back into contention.

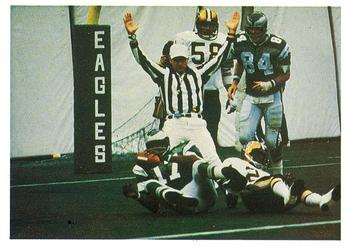
Wide receiver Harold Carmichael scoring a touchdown for the Eagles in 1977

The team regressed in 1972, and Khayat was released after the Eagles finished 2–11–1. The two wins (both on the road) proved to be surprises, however. Philadelphia beat Kansas City (which had the best record in the AFC a year before) 21–20 and Houston 18–17 on six field goals by kicker Tom Dempsey. The latter game became known as the "Johnny Rodgers Bowl", because the loser would finish with the worst record in the league and obtain the #1 draft pick of 1973, which was then assumed to be Nebraska wingback Johnny Rodgers. The 1-13 Oilers ultimately got the #1 pick, which instead turned out to be University of Tampa defensive end John Matuszak (who would end up facing Philadelphia in the Super Bowl several years later). Despite missing out on the top pick, the Eagles nonetheless drafted two future All-Pros, Texas offensive tackle Jerry Sisemore at No. 3 and USC tight end Charle Young at No. 6.

Khayat was replaced by offensive guru Mike McCormick, who, aided by the skills of Roman Gabriel and towering young receiver Harold Carmichael, managed to infuse a bit of vitality into a previously moribund offense. New general manager Jim Murray also began to add talent on the defensive side of the line, most notably through the addition of future Pro Bowl linebacker Bill Bergey. However, the team was still mired in mediocrity. McCormick was fired after a 4–10 1975 season, and replaced by a college coach unknown to most Philadelphians. That coach would become one of the most beloved names in Philadelphia sports history: Dick Vermeil.

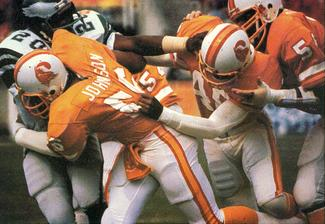
The Eagles playing against the Buccaneers in the 1979 NFC Divisional Playoff Game

Vermeil faced numerous obstacles as he attempted to rejuvenate a franchise that had not seriously contended in well over a decade. Despite the team's young talent and Gabriel's occasional flashes of brilliance, the Eagles finished 1976 with the same result—a 4–10 record—as in 1975. 1977, however, saw the first seeds of hope begin to sprout. Rifle-armed quarterback Ron Jaworski was obtained by trade with the Los Angeles Rams in exchange for popular tight end Charlie Young. The defense, led by Bergey and defensive coordinator Marion Campbell, began earning a reputation as one of the hardest hitting in the league. By the next year, the Eagles had fully taken Vermeil's enthusiastic attitude, and made the playoffs for the first time since 1960. Young running back Wilbert Montgomery became the first Eagle since Steve Van Buren to exceed 1,000 yards in a single season. (1978 also bore witness to one of the greatest, and unquestionably most surreal moment in Eagles history: "The Miracle at the Meadowlands", when Herman Edwards returned a late-game fumble by Giants' quarterback Joe Pisarcik for a touchdown with 20 seconds left, resulting in a 19–17 Eagles victory—the Eagles would later edge into the playoffs that year with a 9–7 season.) By 1979, in which the Eagles tied for first place with an 11–5 record and Wilbert Montgomery shattered club rushing records with a total of 1,512 yards, the Eagles were poised to join the NFL elite.

== Mild success (1980–1990) ==
=== 1980 ===
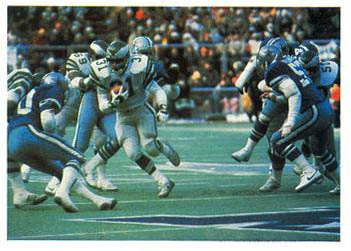
The Eagles defeated the Cowboys in the 1980 NFC Championship Game and earned their first Super Bowl appearance.

In 1980, the Eagles, led by coach Dick Vermeil, quarterback Ron Jaworski, running back Wilbert Montgomery, wide receiver Harold Carmichael, and linebacker Bill Bergey, dominated the NFC, facing their chief nemesis, the Dallas Cowboys, in the NFC Championship. The game was played in cold conditions in front of the Birds' faithful fans at Veterans Stadium. Led by an incredible rushing performance from Montgomery, whose long cutback TD run in the first half is still one of the most memorable plays in Eagles history, and a gutsy performance from fullback Leroy Harris, who scored the Eagles' only other TD that day, the Birds earned a berth in Super Bowl XV with a 20–7 victory.

The Eagles traveled to New Orleans for Super Bowl XV, which was played on January 25, 1981, and were heavy favorites to knock off the Oakland Raiders, who were merely a wild card team. Things did not go the Eagles' way, beginning with the disastrous decision by Tose to bring comedian Don Rickles into the pregame locker room to lighten the mood. Jaworski's first pass was intercepted by Rod Martin, setting up an Oakland touchdown. Later in the first quarter, a potential game-tying 40-yard touchdown pass to Rodney Parker was nullified by an illegal motion penalty, and the Raiders promptly marched down the field and scored again, making the score 14–3 at halftime. The Eagles finally managed to score a touchdown that counted early in the fourth quarter, but Jaworski's third interception of the day on a subsequent drive erased any hope of a comeback. The final score was 27–10. Veteran journeyman quarterback Jim Plunkett was named the game's MVP. In a bizarre coincidence, Joe Kuharich died on the same day.

=== 1981–1985 ===
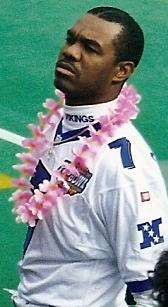
Randall Cunningham, here shown with the Minnesota Vikings, wore #12 and played with the Eagles from 1985 to 1995.

The Eagles got off to a great start in the 1981 season, winning their first six games. They eventually ended up 10–6 and earned a wild card berth. However, they were unable to repeat as NFC champs when they were knocked out in the wild card round by the New York Giants, 27–21. After the Eagles finished 3–6 in the strike-shortened 1982 season, Vermeil quit the team, citing "burnout". He was replaced by defensive coordinator Marion Campbell, aka "the Swamp Fox". Campbell had helped to popularize the "bend-don't-break" defensive strategy in the 1970s. Under him, however, the team struggled, although his stewardship was notable in that it saw the arrival of two all-time football greats; defensive end Reggie White and quarterback Randall Cunningham. The 1983–85 seasons would see the Eagles go 5–11, 6–9–1, and 7–9, respectively, and Marion Campbell was fired after week 16 and replaced by assistant head coach/defensive backs coach Fred Bruney for the last game of the season of 1985. That same year, Tose was forced to sell the Eagles to Norman Braman and Ed Leibowitz, highly successful automobile dealers from Florida, for a reported $65 million (equal to $154,515,780 today) to pay off his more than $25 million (equal to $59,429,146 today) in gambling debts at Atlantic City casinos.

=== 1986–1988 ===
Campbell's reign ended in 1986, when Buddy Ryan was named head coach. Immediately infusing the team with his tough, hard-as-nails attitude, the Eagles quickly became known for their tough defense and tougher personalities. Ryan began rejuvenating the team by releasing several aging players, including Ron Jaworski. Randall Cunningham took his place, and despite a 5–10–1 season, he began showing considerable promise. 1987 saw another strike, reducing the season by one game. The substitutes who were filling in for the strikers turned in a poor performance, being crushed 41–22 by the Dallas Cowboys. After the strike ended, the regular Eagles team won a 37–20 revenge game against Dallas. The season record was 7–8, three games having been played by substitutes. The Eagles would reach the playoffs in 1988, but lost to the Chicago Bears 20–12 in what became known as the "Fog Bowl", due to the weather conditions during the game.

=== 1989–1990 ===
The following two years would see playoff appearances as well, but the team could not make it past the first round. This failure was greatly frustrating to many Eagles fans, as the team was commonly acknowledged as among the most talented in the NFL. On offense, the Eagles were led by quarterback Cunningham, one of the most exciting players of his generation; tight end Keith Jackson; and running back Keith Byars. The defense is commonly acknowledged as among the greatest in league history, and as the best never to win a championship.

The two 1989 matches with Dallas were known as the Bounty Bowls. Both were won easily by the Eagles (the Cowboys finished 1–15 that year), and were marked by Ryan insulting new Cowboys coach Jimmy Johnson, putting a "bounty" on their kicker, and for Eagles fans throwing snowballs on the season ender.

On November 12, 1990, during a Monday Night Football game at the Vet, the Eagles crushed the Washington Redskins by a score of 28–14, with the defense scoring three of the team's four touchdowns. More lopsided than its score would indicate, the game quickly acquired the sobriquet "the Body Bag Game", attesting to the physical damage inflicted by the tougher Eagles squad. The Eagles knocked out the starting Washington quarterback, and then seriously injured his replacement as well. Running back Brian Mitchell, who would later be signed by the Eagles, was forced to play quarterback for the Redskins. Unfortunately, the Redskins returned to Veterans stadium in the first round of the playoffs and defeated the Eagles 20–6, ending their season. Buddy Ryan was fired at the end of the season. Despite his tough talk, the Eagles failed to win a playoff game in the five years he had been head coach.

== Kotite and Rhodes (1991–1998) ==
In 1991, the Eagles became the first NFL team since 1975 to rank first in the league in both rushing and passing yardage allowed, but with the loss of Randall Cunningham to an ACL tear in week 1 and competing in a strong division were unable to reach the playoffs despite a 10–6 record. Along with White, notable defensive stars included Jerome Brown, Clyde Simmons, Seth Joyner, Eric Allen, Wes Hopkins, and Andre Waters.

With Ryan's firing by Norman Braman, Ryan's former offensive coordinator, Rich Kotite, took the helm of the franchise. Although Cunningham suffered a season-ending ACL tear in the season opener, veteran backup QB Jim McMahon performed admirably in his stead and the Eagles still made a respectable showing, missing the playoffs on a tiebreaker. In 1992, Kotite led the Eagles back into the postseason with an 11–5 record. In the wild-card round, the Eagles overcame a 4th quarter deficit and soundly defeated the New Orleans Saints by a final score of 36–20. The Eagles were eliminated by Dallas the next week in the divisional round, 34–10. At the end of the season, DE Reggie White would leave the team through free agency. In the 1992 NFL Off-season, DT Jerome Brown died in a high-speed automobile crash on June 25. In 1993 and 1994, Kotite's Eagles would fall apart after initially promising starts and missed the playoffs in each season, going 8–8 and 7–9 after starting 4–0 and 7–2, respectively. By this point, the notoriously cheap Braman had become unpopular with the fanbase and a polarizing presence in the front office. Under rising scrutiny and deflating optimism, he sold the team to film producer and current owner Jeffrey Lurie. Lurie's first act was to fire Kotite.

Lurie's choice to replace Kotite was San Francisco 49ers Defensive Coordinator Ray Rhodes, who successfully lobbied 49ers star Ricky Watters to join the team as a free agent. In 1995, Rhodes's first season, the Eagles got off to a slow start by losing 3 out their first 4 games, but they subsequently rebounded and finished the season with a 10–6 record and a playoff spot. In the wild-card round, the Eagles played at home and overwhelmed the Detroit Lions 58–37, with 31 of Philadelphia's points coming in the second quarter alone. Before the game, Lions tackle Lomas Brown had infamously guaranteed that Detroit would win the game, "it was only a question of by how much." In the divisional round against the Cowboys the next week, starting QB Rodney Peete was injured early on and replaced by Randall Cunningham in what would turn out to be his last game as an Eagle. Cunningham would score the team's only touchdown of the game—and the last Eagles post season touchdown for six years—on a garbage-time run. Unhappy with his role as a backup, he would retire after the season amidst rumors of an attempted trade to the Arizona Cardinals.

In 1996, the Eagles donned new uniforms featuring a darker shade of green. They got off to a good start, winning three of their first four games. However, a week-5 Monday night game at Veterans Stadium against the hated Cowboys would witness a season-ending knee injury to Peete and the loss of the team's momentum, and the transition to an offense led by Ty Detmer and Watters. While Detmer played well and Watters rushed for 1,411 yards, the season followed an all-too-familiar pattern: 10–6 record, and early elimination (a 14–0 shutout by the 49ers) in the playoffs. The continued early playoff exits led to fans and local media blaming the high priced free agent signings (Irving Fryar, Watters, Troy Vincent, and Guy McIntyre) for not stepping up in big games, most notably the postseason. Rhodes gradually deteriorated under the stress of the job, and players were beginning to grow tired of his brash demeanor and often autocratic coaching style. After an up-and-down 6–9–1 campaign in 1997, the bottom fell out in 1998. The Eagles suffered a catastrophic 3–13 record—the worst in franchise history, as each of Philadelphia's three quarterbacks won one game. They were ranked dead last in numerous offensive statistics. Home game attendance was declining, a quarterback controversy was deteriorating an already rudderless locker room, and the players had all but tuned out the embattled coaching staff. Left with little choice after a disastrous season, fan revolt and sagging team morale, Lurie fired Rhodes.

== The Reid era (1999–2012) ==
=== 1999–2002 ===
Resurgence would come under the leadership of new head coach Andy Reid, who began by drafting Syracuse QB Donovan McNabb with the #2 pick in the 1999 draft (the Eagles would have had the #1 pick, but it was awarded to the rebooted Cleveland Browns). Despite clearing up roster space for new talent by releasing unpopular, aging veterans (such as Watters and Irving Fryar), Reid was still a virtual unknown at the time of his selection as head coach, and his appointment was met with considerable skepticism in Philadelphia. McNabb was also not considered a good choice to draft by Eagles fans. When he was drafted, many Eagles fans booed the selection, believing that the Eagles should draft Ricky Williams. The choices proved wise, however: with Reid leading the way and McNabb emerging as one of the game's great players. However, 1999 was a rebuilding year and so the Eagles only won five games and game attendance was still looking stale as two home games were not sold out—resulting in local TV blackouts- while the other six were only sold out due to several small business owners purchasing the remainder of the unsold tickets to spare TV viewers. The Week 5 game, on Sunday, October 10, 1999, in Philadelphia, Pennsylvania, saw Dallas WR Michael Irvin suffer a career-ending spinal injury where Eagles fans stood up and cheered as he lay on the field. Even the TV commentators expressed their disgust at this behavior. The 2000 season saw the team go 11–5, reaching the playoffs as a wildcard which rejuvenated the fan base and optimism. After brushing aside the Tampa Bay Buccaneers 21–3, the Eagles moved to the second round of the playoffs, only to lose a 20–10 game against the Giants.

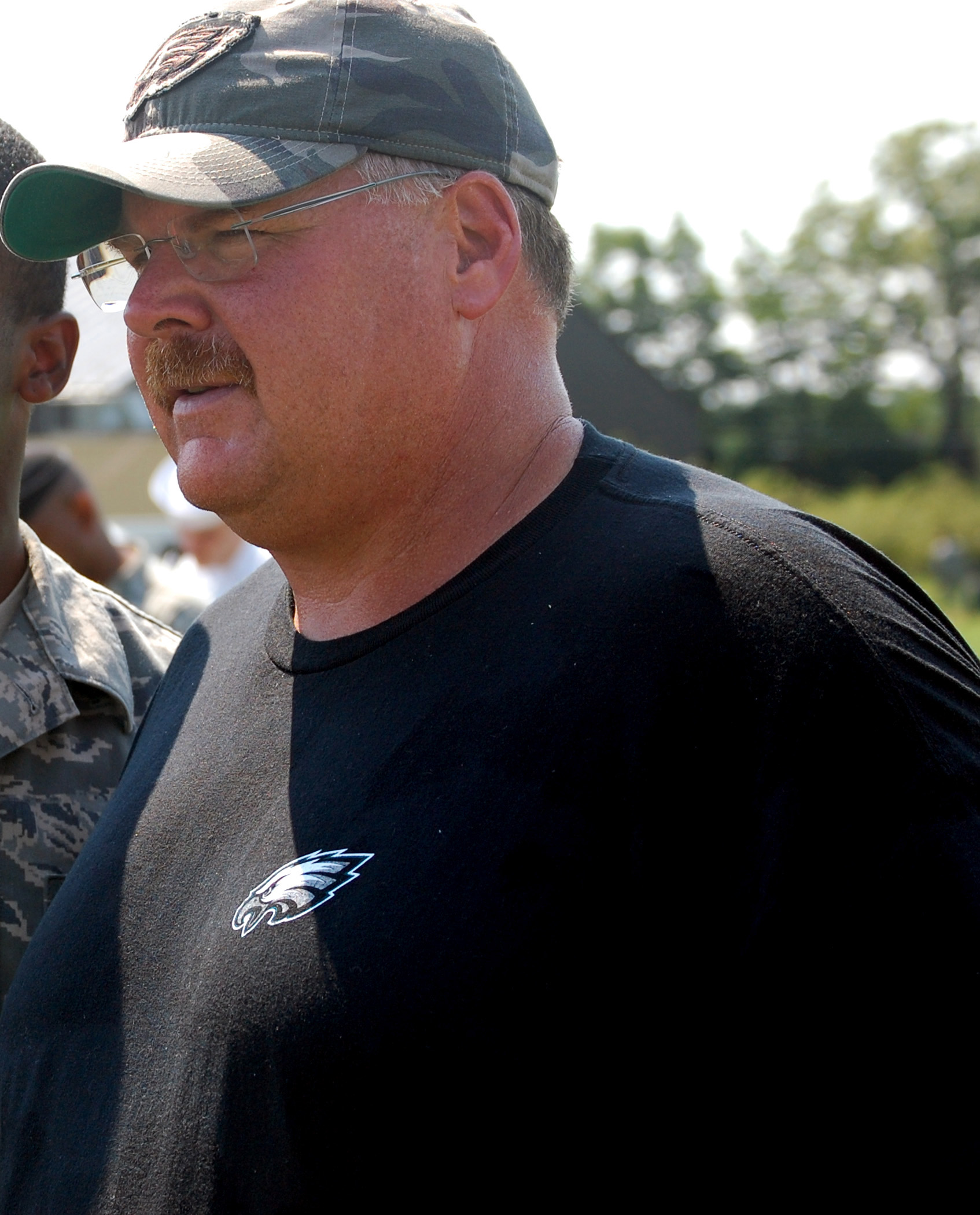
Andy Reid was brought in to coach the Eagles in 1999.

The 2000 regular season opener in Dallas (September 3), became known in NFL lore as the "Pickle Juice Game". Kickoff temperature in Texas Stadium was 109 degrees Fahrenheit and soared to nearly 120, making it the hottest game in league history, beating a previous record set during the 1997 Cowboys-Cardinals match in Arizona. The nickname came about because a certain Eagles trainer had been preparing for the projected high temperatures by having the players drink the juice from jars of dill pickles in order to retain body moisture and stave off cramps and heat exhaustion. The experiment proved a success as the Eagles won the game 44–14, while the Cowboys had multiple players benched for inability to handle the brutal temperatures (the Eagles had no players benched). The game also had significance because it marked the beginning of Philadelphia's domination of the NFC East and the end of the Cowboys' dominance.

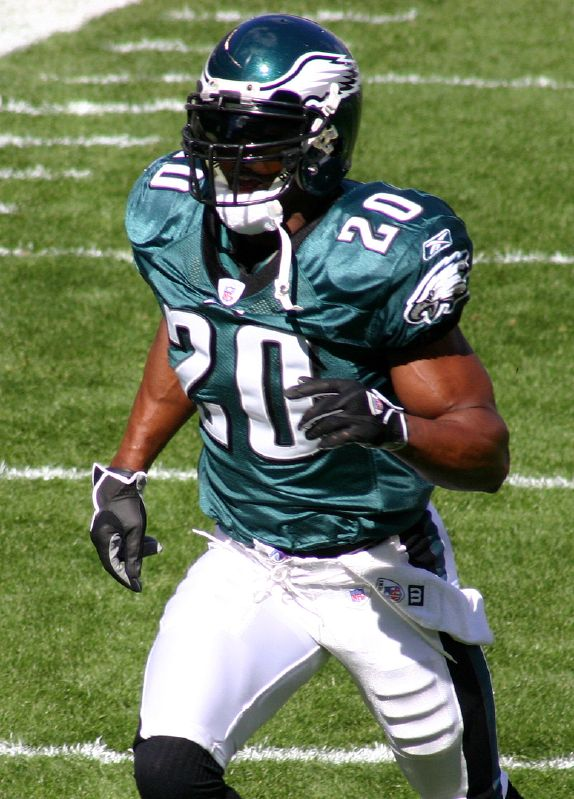
Brian Dawkins in 2007

After compiling an 11–5 record in 2001, the Eagles reached the playoffs again, this time at the top of their division. In a near-rerun of the previous year, they disposed of the Buccaneers in a 31–9 game. In the second round, the Eagles defeated the Bears 33–19 at Soldier Field. Reaching the NFC Championship game, they were unable to stop the St. Louis Rams, who defeated them 29–24.

Despite injuries, McNabb led the Eagles to a 12–4 season in 2002. Once again, they reached the NFC Championship, but lost at home 27–10 to the eventual Super Bowl champion Tampa Bay Buccaneers in the last game at Veterans Stadium.

=== 2003 ===
The 2003 team lost its first two games, both at their new home. In the opening game of the 2003 season, the Eagles were shut out 17–0 by the Tampa Bay Buccaneers in the first regular-season game ever played at Lincoln Financial Field. Once again, the team went 12–4 for the season. By reaching the conference championship game in the same year as this defeat, they became the first team in modern history to get that far in the postseason after having been shut out at home in its first game. They achieved that distinction despite getting only five touchdown catches all year from their wide receivers, which tied the league-low since the regular-season schedule was lengthened to its present 16 games in 1978 (this record would be broken in 2004 when the New York Giants' wide receivers caught only two touchdown passes). The Eagle receivers even went through both September and October without a TD catch—the last time an NFL team had done that was in 1945.

=== 2004 Super Bowl run ===
The Eagles actively pursued premier wide receiver Terrell Owens, and acquired him in a controversial three-way deal with the Baltimore Ravens and the San Francisco 49ers, on March 16, 2004. Owens would often feud with McNabb, and was released by the Eagles after the 2005 season.

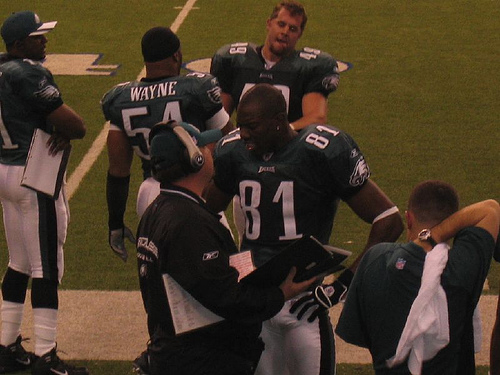
Terrell Owens spent two controversial years with the Philadelphia Eagles.

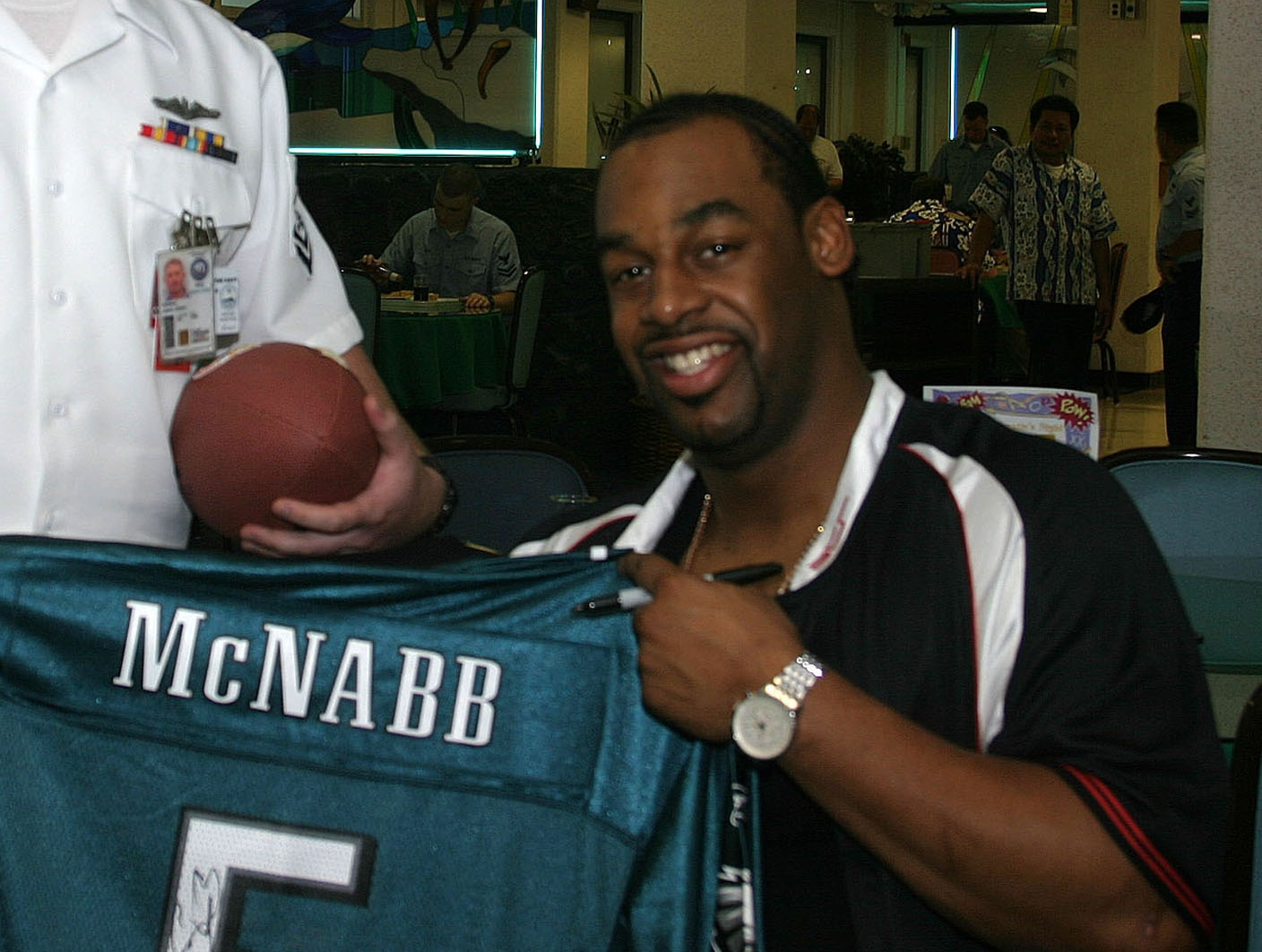
Donovan McNabb in 2004

The 2004 season began with a bang as Owens caught three touchdown passes from McNabb in their season opener against the New York Giants. Owens would end up with exactly 1,200 receiving yards and 14 touchdown receptions, although his season ended prematurely with an ankle injury on December 19 against the Dallas Cowboys. Their 12–7 victory in this game gave them home field advantage throughout the conference playoffs for the third year in a row. [This distinction also includes a "bye" in the first round (also known as the wild-card round) of the playoffs, which the top two teams in each conference receive.] The Eagles tied a record by clinching the NFC East division crown (their fourth straight such title) after only their eleventh game of the season, matching the mark set by the 1985 Chicago Bears and the 1997 San Francisco 49ers. Their final two regular-season games thus rendered meaningless, the Eagles sat out most of their first-string players in these games and lost them both, yet still finished with a 13–3 record, their best 16-game season ever. McNabb had his finest season to date, passing for 3,875 yards and 31 touchdowns, with only eight interceptions. This made him the first quarterback in NFL history to throw 30 or more TD passes and fewer than 10 interceptions in a single regular season. They then began their playoff run with the Divisional round at home against the sixth-seeded Minnesota Vikings. The Eagles led from the start and never looked back, as McNabb led a very efficient passing attack (21 of 33 for 286 yards and 2 TDs), Brian Westbrook dominated on the ground with 70 rushing yards, and Freddie Mitchell performed very well on the receiving corps (5 receptions for 65 yards and a TD), as Philadelphia won 27–14, setting up their fourth-straight NFC Championship appearance.

The Eagles' futility in Conference Championship games had become notorious. In 2002, the Eagles had fallen in the NFC Championship Game against the Rams in St. Louis, 29–24. In 2003, the Eagles hosted the Tampa Bay Buccaneers at Veterans Stadium and were widely viewed as the overwhelming favorites—this view no doubt accentuated by the expected emotional boost that many anticipated would power the team, given that the game was to be the last at "the Vet". After a promising start, however, the game slipped away, and the ensuing 27–10 loss devastated a fan base that had already become accustomed to disappointment. In 2004, a banged-up Eagles squad managed to overcome numerous injuries, particularly to its defense, to reach the NFC Championship for the third year in a row, only to have suffered a 14–3 loss against the Carolina Panthers.

==== Fourth championship appearance ====
On January 23, 2005, the Eagles defeated the Atlanta Falcons 27–10, sending them to Super Bowl XXXIX in Jacksonville, Florida, their first Super Bowl appearance in 24 years. The victory was followed by celebrations in Philadelphia

==== Super Bowl XXXIX ====
With two Super Bowl wins under their belt, the defending champion New England Patriots were heavily favored. McNabb had a great game with 357 yards and three touchdowns, but he also threw three interceptions. Terrell Owens returned despite his injury, and caught 122 yards on 9 catches. The game was a defensive struggle through the third quarter, but in the fourth, the Patriots took the lead, with the Eagles trailing ten points. The early game struggle left everyone exhausted, and for his best efforts, McNabb scored one touchdown, but could not get the team within field goal range on the final drive. He was picked off in the closing seconds of the game. The final score was 24–21, and the Patriots had won their third Super Bowl in four years.

=== 2005 ===
The defending NFC Champions did not fare well the next year. The season was tainted by a locker room division started by Terrell Owens, who argued that he should be paid more following the Super Bowl season. The 2005 season began in a strange and erratic fashion with a 14–10 road loss to the Atlanta Falcons on Monday Night Football, a game in which Donovan McNabb suffered a chest bruise. In addition, Eagles linebacker Jeremiah Trotter was ejected prior to kick-off for getting involved in an altercation with Falcons cornerback Kevin Mathis. In the Week 2 home opener in Philadelphia, the Eagles defeated the San Francisco 49ers in a rout 42–3; however, McNabb was diagnosed with a sports hernia following the game. Weeks 3 and 4 saw the Eagles struggle somewhat but still manage to defeat the Oakland Raiders (23–20) and mount a stunning comeback from an 18-point deficit to defeat the Kansas City Chiefs at Arrowhead Stadium (37–31). In week 5, the Eagles were manhandled by the Dallas Cowboys in Texas Stadium, losing by 23 points (33–10). Following a bye week, the Eagles pulled off a miraculous 20–17 win against the San Diego Chargers when cornerback Matt Ware returned a blocked field goal for a touchdown in the fourth quarter. Fans hoped the play would "wake up" the Eagles and save the season similar to Brian Westbrook's fourth quarter punt return against the New York Giants in 2003. However, in the next week, the Eagles were unable to stop the running and passing attack of the Denver Broncos, losing 49–21.

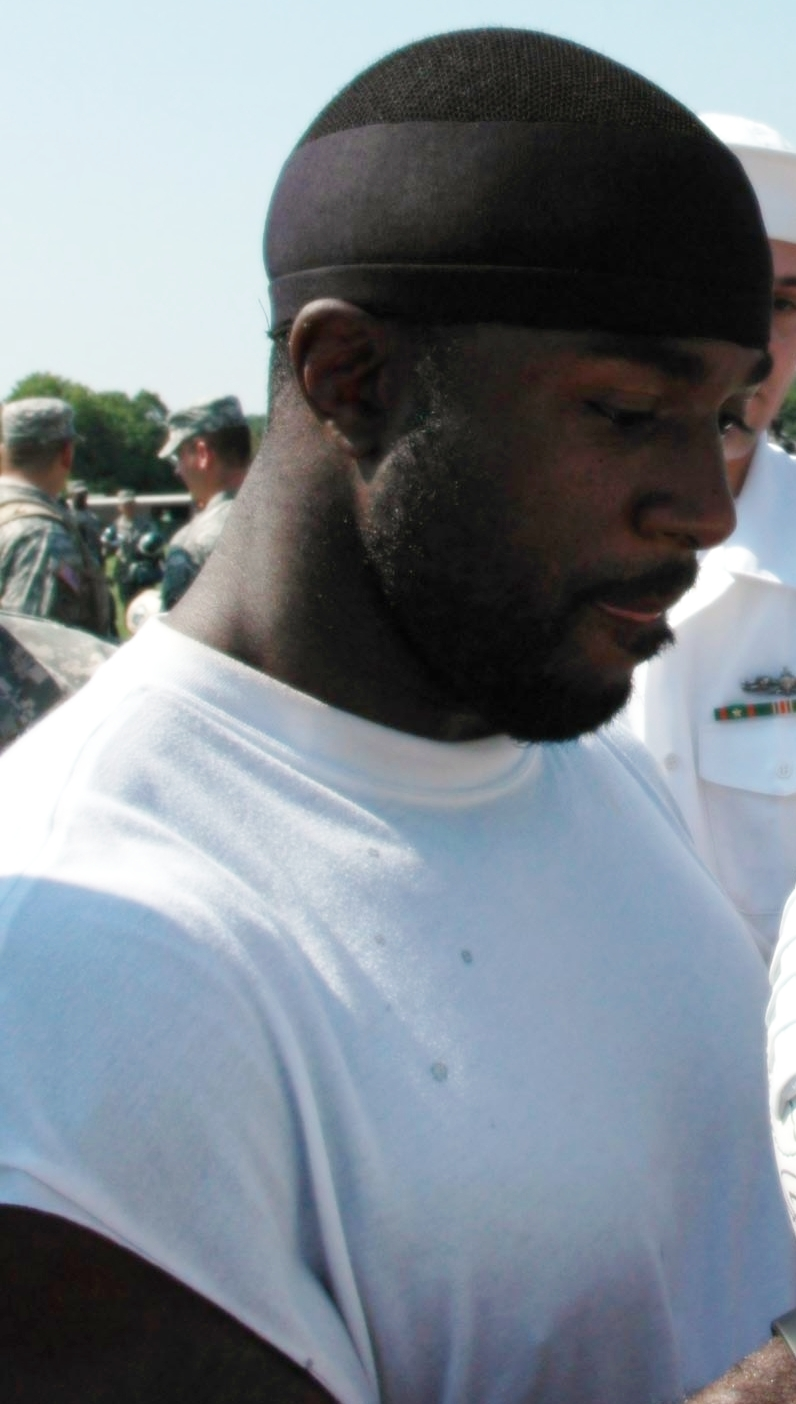
Brian Westbrook was not only a solid Eagles running back, but a receiving threat out of the backfield.

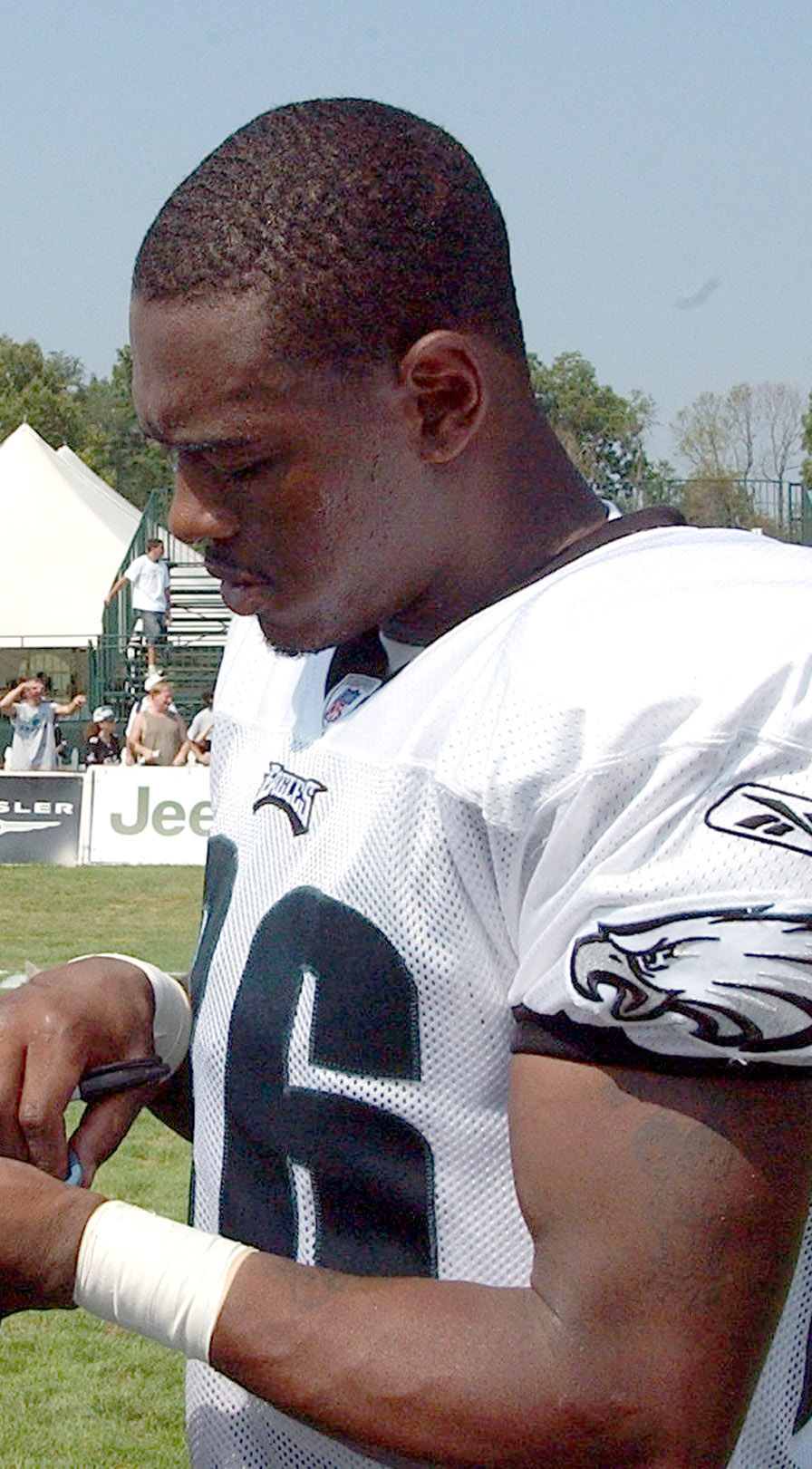
Lito Sheppard signing autographs in 2005

On November 4, 2005, on ESPN, Terrell Owens criticized the Eagles front office for not recognizing his 100th touchdown catch. He also agreed with Michael Irvin's statement that the Eagles would be undefeated had Brett Favre been the quarterback. Despite Owens's apology the next day to the front office (but not to McNabb), he was suspended indefinitely. There were also reports that he got into a fistfight with Hugh Douglas and challenged other players in the locker room which contributed to his suspension. At Andy Reid's press conference after the Washington loss, he announced T.O. would no longer be playing this year for the Eagles due to conduct detrimental to the team.

Things only got worse for the Eagles. They lost a Sunday night match-up to their division rival, the Washington Redskins 17–10. Then, when they went home and played a rematch with their much-hated rival, the Cowboys, on Monday Night Football, a late game interception by Roy Williams sealed their doom. Not only did they lose 21–20, but the already suffering Donovan McNabb got shoved to the ground, worsening his sports hernia and ending his season.

On November 20, former Detroit quarterback Mike McMahon was named the Eagles starter. However, his wild gun passing did not do much to phase the Giants, as the Eagles went down again 27–17. Then, on November 21 Donovan McNabb announced that he would undergo surgery for his sports hernia. The Eagles would finish the season without at least eight of their projected starters heading into the season, including Pinkston, Hank Fraley, Dirk Johnson, and Pro Bowlers McNabb, Brian Westbrook, Lito Sheppard, Tra Thomas, and the exiled Owens.

Their next-to-last win of the season came a week later against the injury-ravaged Green Bay Packers 19–14. At a home game on December 5, on Monday Night Football, the Eagles retired #92, which had belonged to the late Reggie White. Unfortunately, they got shut out horrifically by the NFC West and eventual NFC champion Seattle Seahawks 42–0. Afterwards, they lost to the Giants at home 26–23. Their last win of the season came on the road against the St. Louis Rams 17–16. Then they lost their last two games of the season to the Arizona Cardinals on the road 27–21 and then at home to the wild card Washington Redskins 31–20. They ended their 2005 season at 6–10, which marked the first time since 1999 that the Eagles failed to make the playoffs. The Eagles also went 0–6 against their division, after going 6–0 against their division in 2004. The Eagles became the first team in NFL history to go winless against their division after going undefeated against their division the previous season.

After expectations of a return to the Super Bowl, it appeared the Eagles would have to retool in the 2006 off-season to make another run for the Vince Lombardi Trophy.

=== 2006 ===
In 2006, the Eagles started off hot, beating the Houston Texans in Houston 24–10. And they kept the streak going, jumping to a 24–7 lead against the Giants before losing 30–24 in overtime. They won their next two games easily, beating the 49ers in San Francisco and then returning home to limit Brett Favre's Packers to three field goals. The Birds' 3–1 record set the stage for Terrell Owens' return to Philadelphia.

Owens's return to Philadelphia was being promoted by Fox as the "game of the year". The game had more at stake, because the winner would take the lead in the NFC East. Owens received boos and jokes about his accidental overdose from a sell-out crowd. Lito Sheppard's game-winning interception for a touchdown sealed the game for the Eagles, 38–24.

McNabb's season was already considered one of the finest in Eagles history and his career. After the win against Owens's Cowboys, they faced the upstart New Orleans Saints, with critics claiming the winner would be the NFC favorite. The Eagles ended up losing 27–24 on a last-second field goal. The next week at Tampa, the Eagles would once again lose on a last second field goal. This time the field goal was an improbable 62 yarder by Matt Bryant—then the second-longest in NFL History.

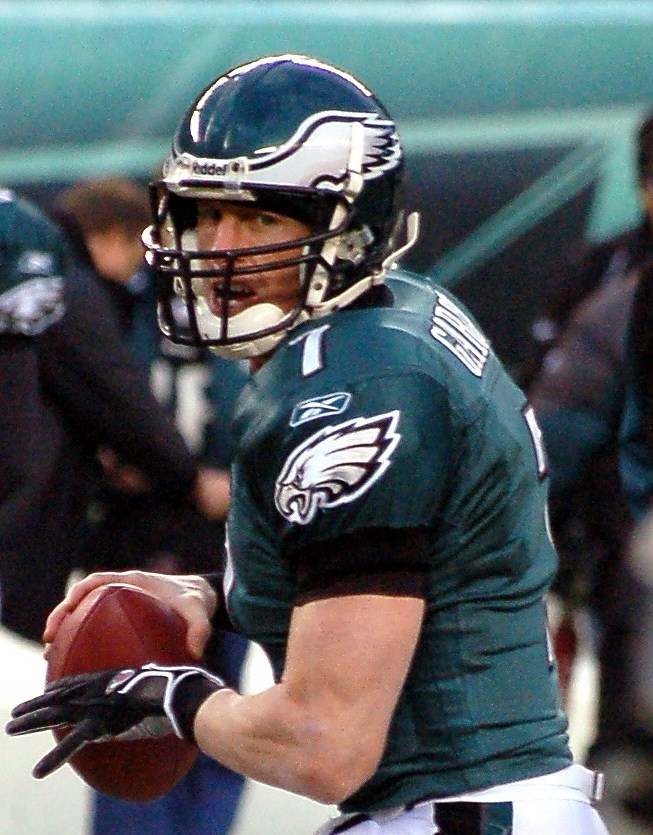
Jeff Garcia played with the Eagles in 2006. He threw 10 touchdowns and only two interceptions.

One week before their bye, the Eagles faced the Jacksonville Jaguars and failed to score a touchdown in a 13–6 loss. After their bye, they routed the Redskins, which not only kept Reid/McNabb perfect after the bye week, it put them back on track after three consecutive losses. The Birds were on a roll going into their match with Vince Young's Titans, but were dominated throughout the game, losing 31–13. The bigger loss however was Donovan McNabb—who suffered a season-ending injury for the second straight year.

With Donovan McNabb going down to injury, the Eagles called on Jeff Garcia to lead the team. The move was a highly unpopular one, because fans believed A.J. Feeley was their best bet. After falling to Peyton Manning's Indianapolis Colts, the Eagles' record stood at 5–6, and they did not appear to be in playoff contention.

However, Garcia led the team to an improbable five-game winning streak, which included a three-game NFC East road trip and a Christmas showdown in Dallas. The Eagles finished the season 10–6, but lost the tie-breaker to the Saints, meaning they would be the third seed.

The Eagles won their home wild card game against the Giants 23–20, on a David Akers' field goal. The game officially sent Tiki Barber into retirement. Their divisional playoff game was a Week 6 rematch against the Saints. The Eagles lost by the same score as in the regular season: 27–24. Andy Reid made the controversial decision to punt with less than two minutes remaining.

=== 2007 ===
2007 marked the Eagles' 75th season. The Eagles drafted quarterback Kevin Kolb from Houston, signaling a possible life beyond McNabb. McNabb delivered average performances, and missed three games due to an injury. The team only achieved an 8–8 record and missed the playoffs by one game.

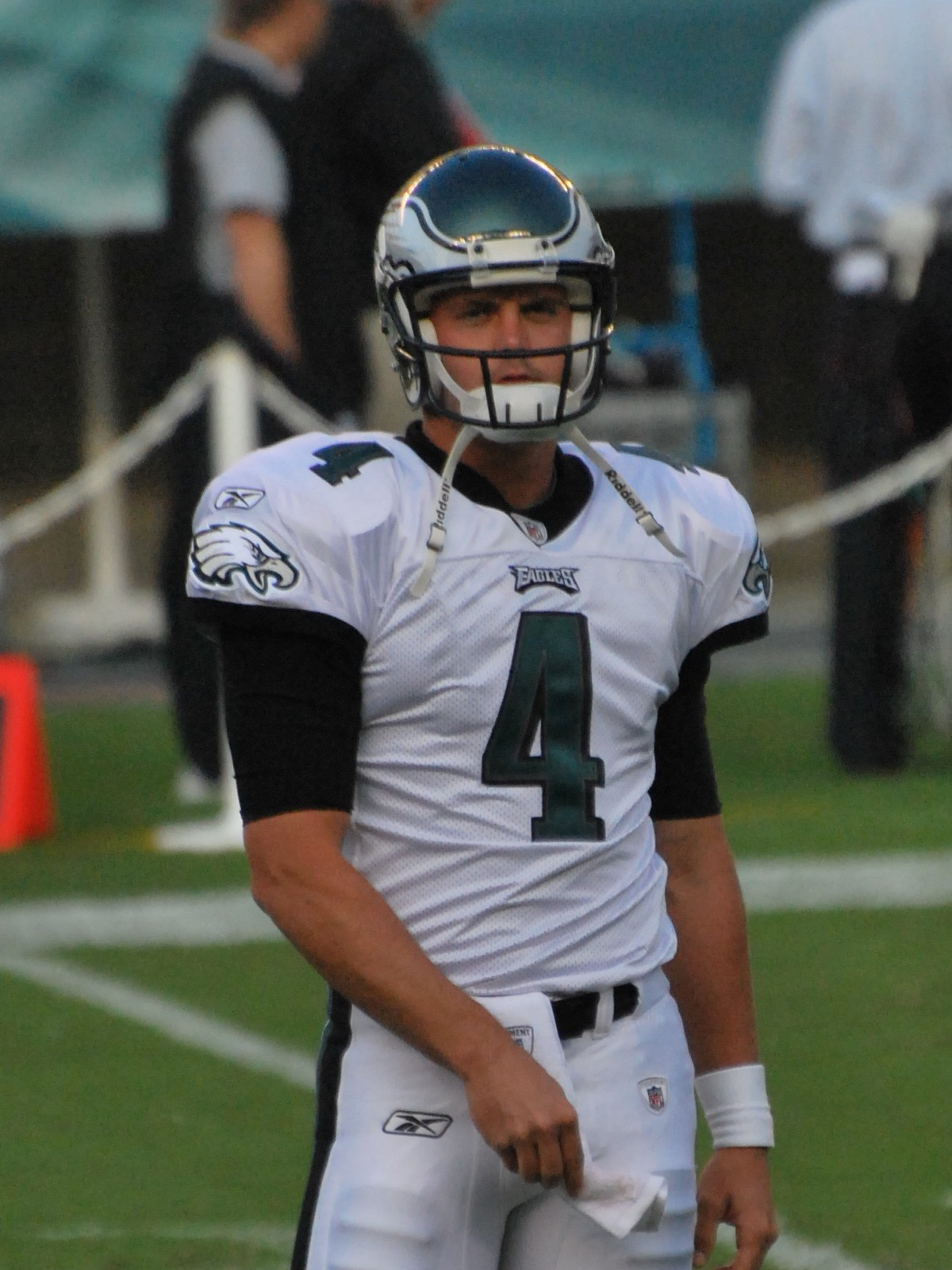
Kevin Kolb spent time as the Eagles starting quarterback from 2007 to 2010.

=== 2008 ===
The beginning of 2008 presented a good opportunity for the Eagles. Donovan McNabb got a good start to the season, Brian Westbrook ran for many touchdowns, and rookie receiver DeSean Jackson became an important figure in the Eagles' passing game. However, the Eagles went against the 1–8 Bengals in Week 10 and McNabb played horribly, throwing consistent interceptions and leading the Eagles to a ten-point deficit at the half. Despite being able to score those ten points, the game went into overtime. A Bengals missed field goal led to Eagles ball, but McNabb's 'Hail Mary' was deflected with seconds left in overtime, and the game ended in a 13–13 tie, the first since 2002. McNabb then sparked controversy by admitting that he was unaware that an NFL game could end in a tie.

Against Baltimore, things were even worse. At halftime, due to bad performance, McNabb was benched. However, the Eagles needed him, and it would show. His backup, Kevin Kolb, managed to get the Eagles to the Baltimore two-yard line; he then threw an interception in the end zone that was returned by Ed Reed for a record 107-yard touchdown.

By this time, the Eagles needed a quarterback for the next week's match-up against the Arizona Cardinals, who appeared positioned to win their division for the first time in decades. The game was scheduled for Thanksgiving night, and the decision was eventually made to start Donovan McNabb, but if he played like he did in the last couple of weeks, he would probably be benched for the season. But McNabb instead led the Eagles to a 48–21 victory, throwing for four touchdowns. The Eagles went on a three-game win streak following up the Cardinals victory with wins over the Giants and Browns. The Eagles then lost to a 10-3 Redskins team, putting their post season prospects in doubt.

On December 28, 2008, the Eagles needed Oakland Raiders (4–11) to defeat the Tampa Bay Buccaneers (9–6), and either the Minnesota Vikings (9–6) losing to the New York Giants (12–3) or the Chicago Bears (8–7) losing to Houston Texans (7–8), on top of the Eagles needing to beat the Cowboys at 4:00. However, getting the help that they needed earlier in the day, the Eagles were able to run over the Dallas Cowboys 44–6 and advanced to the playoffs. The Raiders were down 24–14 and came back to win, and the game was being shown and watched by Eagles fans at Lincoln Financial Field before the Eagles-Cowboys game. The Eagles then defeated the Minnesota Vikings 26–14 in the first round of the playoffs on January 4, 2009. They defeated their division rival and the defending Super Bowl champions the New York Giants 23–11 in the NFC Divisional Round to advance to their fifth NFC Championship game in nine years. For the third time in a decade, an all-Pennsylvania Super Bowl seemed possible, as the Pittsburgh Steelers won the AFC Championship against the Baltimore Ravens. However, the Eagles lost 32–25 to the Arizona Cardinals.

=== 2009 ===
In August, the team stirred up controversy by signing ex-Falcons quarterback Michael Vick, who had recently been released from prison for federal dogfighting charges. On the regular season opener against Carolina, McNabb sustained a broken rib and sat out the next two games, with Kevin Kolb taking his place as starter. Afterwards, Philadelphia endured a bad loss to New Orleans, but then beat Kansas City the following week. McNabb returned, and Vick also began playing (as he had been barred from the first two games). He got off to a slow start and was used sparingly for much of the season. After a 13–9 loss in Oakland, the Eagles defeated the Redskins 27–17 on Monday Night Football. During this game, running back Brian Westbrook suffered a severe concussion and was knocked unconscious. He returned to play in the Week 10 game against San Diego, but was felled by a second concussion. Afterwards, Philadelphia went on a five-game winning streak and clinching a playoff berth after defeating the Broncos in Week 16, which marked Brian Westbrook's return to action after an absence of five weeks. However, the season ended with a whimper, as they were shut out by a resurgent Cowboys squad the following week. This put Dallas at the top of the NFC East and gave the Eagles a wild card spot. The two teams then had to play again the following week, but Philadelphia went down to defeat a second time, the score being 34–14.

=== 2010 ===
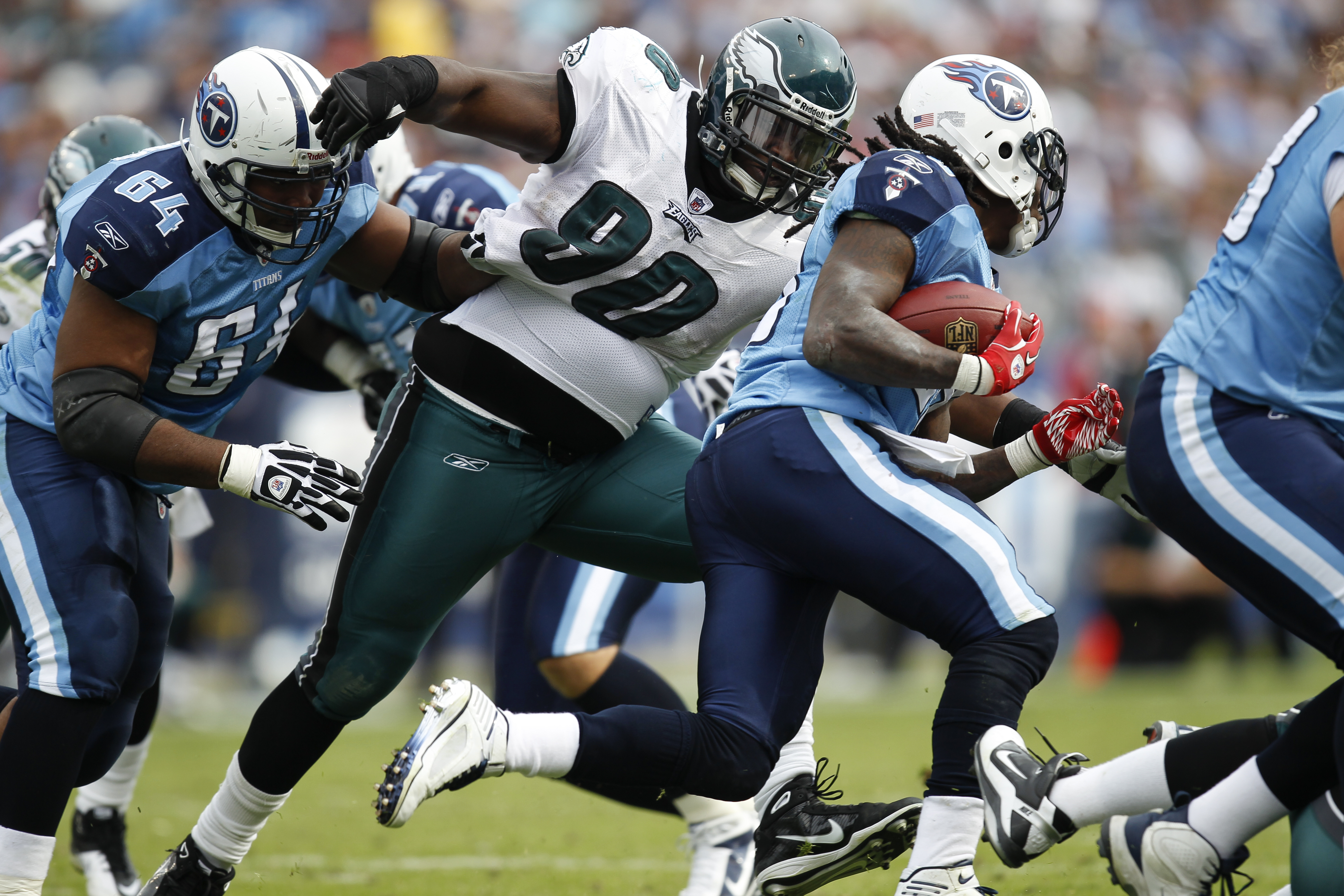
Eagles' defensive tackle Antonio Dixon tackles Chris Johnson of the Tennessee Titans, October 24, 2010.

On January 11, 2010, general manager Tom Heckert was hired by the Cleveland Browns in the same role. He was replaced by Howie Roseman, who was promoted from vice president of player personnel. On February 23, 2010, the Eagles released starting running back Brian Westbrook, Eagles' all-time leader in yards from scrimmage with 9,785 yards.

A bigger surprise came on Easter Sunday, when the team traded quarterback Donovan McNabb to their division rival Washington Redskins for a second-round (37th overall) pick in the 2010 NFL draft, and a third- or fourth-round pick in the 2011 NFL draft. Kevin Kolb was named team's starting quarterback.

The Kolb era did not begin on a positive note as the Eagles donned their throwback kelly green jerseys and hosted the Green Bay Packers in their opening game as both teams performed poorly in the first half, although that was partially because of weather conditions and damaged turf in Lincoln Financial Field. Kolb was thrown to the ground by Packers linebacker Clay Matthews and was forced to sit out the rest of the game after it was determined that he suffered a concussion. Five other Packers and Eagles players were also injured in the game. Michael Vick replaced Kolb, but the Packers ended up winning the game, 27–20, the Packers' first win in Philadelphia since 1962 and their first-ever win on Lincoln Financial Field.

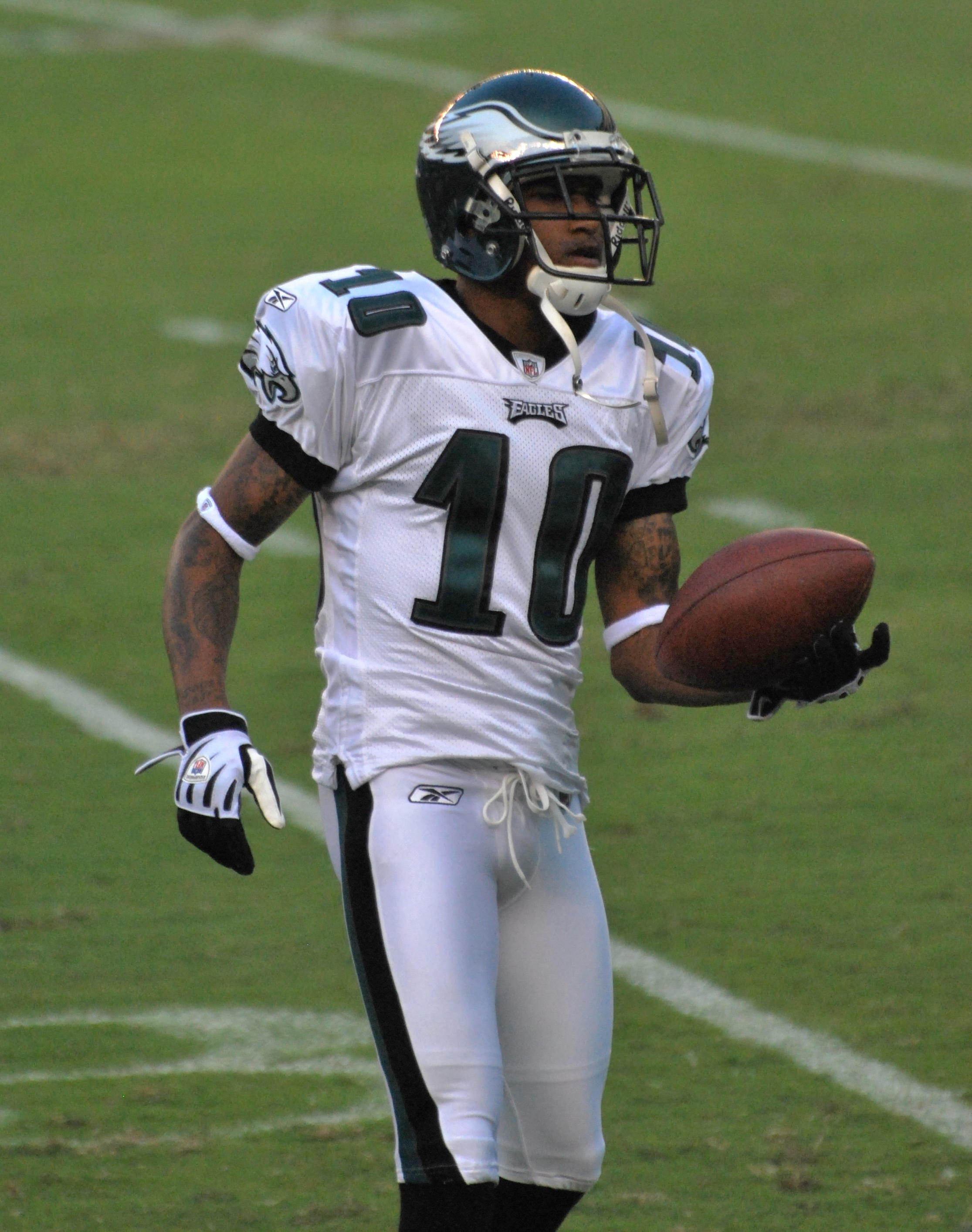
DeSean Jackson was a valuable receiver and returner for the Eagles.

With Vick taking over as starter, the Eagles traveled and defeated the Detroit Lions 35–32 in week 2 with Vick's impressive performance in the team's offense. Although Kolb was presumed to be the starter after he recovered from injury, Andy Reid named Vick as the starting quarterback instead. The team then traveled to Jacksonville. Vick scored four touchdowns (three passing and one rushing) and no interceptions in a 28–3 rout of the Jaguars.

Week 4 saw the return of McNabb to Philadelphia. He was generally given a warm reception, and the Redskins got a touchdown early in the first quarter. After that, both offenses sputtered and the Eagles had to settle for two field goals. But things rapidly fell apart when Vick was injured late in the first quarter with chest and rib injuries he suffered when two Redskins defensive backs crushed him from both sides while running near to the end zone. Kolb was once again brought out as starter, but delivered an uninspired performance. He did manage a touchdown pass in the fourth quarter, but it was too little too late. A two-point conversion attempt after the touchdown failed, and Washington won 16–12. Afterward, Vick was diagnosed with cracked cartilage and forced to sit out at least one game.

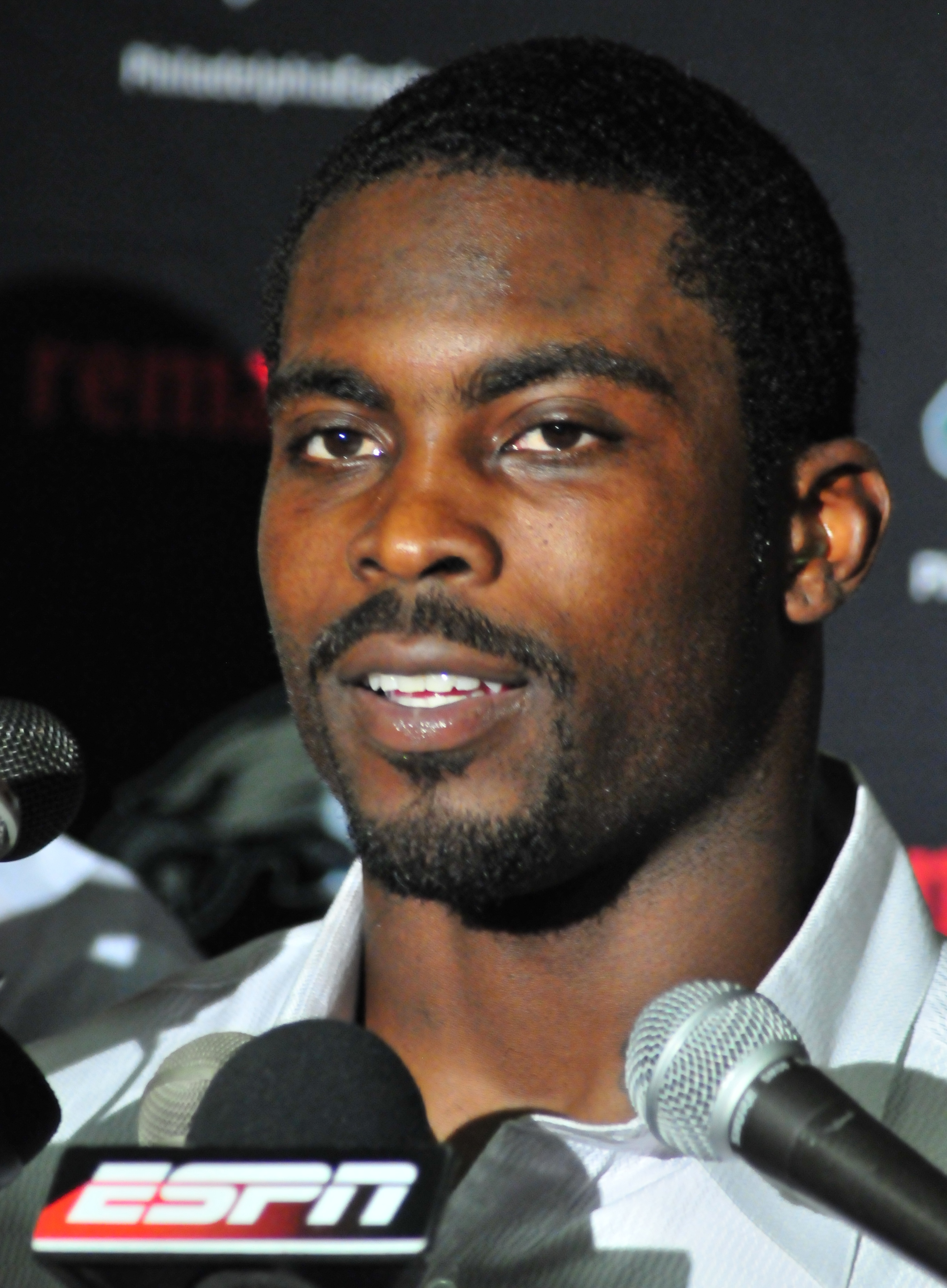
Michael Vick eventually took over the starting quarterback spot.

With Kolb starting, the Eagles headed to San Francisco for a Sunday Night Football match against the 0–4 49ers. Kolb passed for 253 yards and one touchdown to lead his team to a 27–24 victory. Philadelphia won its first home game in week 6 by overpowering the Falcons 31–17. Kolb continued to improve, passing for 326 yards, three touchdown passes, and one interception. However, he was not able to sustain this momentum in the week 8 game against Tennessee, throwing two interceptions and only one touchdown. The Eagles lost 37–19 to enter their bye week at 4–3, and once again Vick was brought out as starter prior to hosting Indianapolis in week 10. This game proved an intense, highly physical contest as Vick scored two touchdowns (one passing and one rushing) and Philadelphia overcame stubborn resistance by the Colts to win 27–24. Afterwards, the Eagles headed to Washington, where, for the second year in a row, they faced the Redskins on Monday Night Football. Philadelphia quickly marched out to two touchdowns in the first quarter, putting them up at 14–0 within five minutes. By the second quarter, they had scored another two, leading by 28 points. Four more touchdowns followed in a 59–28 blowout of Washington. All in all, there were eight (four passing, three rushing, and one interception return), six of which were from Michael Vick, who had 333 passing and 80 rushing yards for one of the finest performances of his career.

For the third season in a row, the Eagles traveled to Chicago, a team that Michael Vick had a career 0–4 record against. This time would be no different as the Bears' defense slowed him down to win 31–26. Vick also threw his first interception of the season. The Eagles rebounded with a Thursday game against Houston. Despite winning 34–24, Philadelphia's defense turned in a relatively mediocre performance, which may have had to do with the fact that the team had played four games in a 17-day stretch.

On Sunday Night in Week 14, the Eagles headed to Dallas for a game with their arch-rivals. However, the Cowboys were a considerably weaker team than when they defeated Philadelphia three times in 2009. Their QB Tony Romo was out of commission from an injury, they had had their head coach Wade Phillips fired halfway through the season, and they were barely clinging to life at 4–9. Michael Vick delivered an average performance, although one of the game's highlights was a 90-yard TD pass to DeSean Jackson. Although Andy Reid had gained a reputation as a pass-happy coach, the Eagles' scoring was mainly based on run plays and long field goals. Despite a close game, they prevailed 30–27 and eliminated Dallas from playoff contention.

In Week 15, the Eagles beat New York in a shocking upset by overcoming a 21-point deficit in the second half. In the closing seconds of the game, DeSean Jackson returned a punt 65 yards for a touchdown to win 38–31. This became known as the Miracle at the New Meadowlands. After locking up their first division title in four years, the Eagles played a surprisingly bad game against Minnesota and lost. The team lost a meaningless season ender against Dallas before preparing to host Green Bay again in the wild card round of the playoffs. Despite playing the Packers hard, Philadelphia's first home playoff game since 2006 ended in defeat 21–16 as Vick threw a hail mary interception in the closing minute of the 4th quarter. Pro bowler David Akers, who had one of the best seasons ever by a kicker, also contributed to the loss having a rare poor game going 1 for 3, missing from 34 & 41 yards.

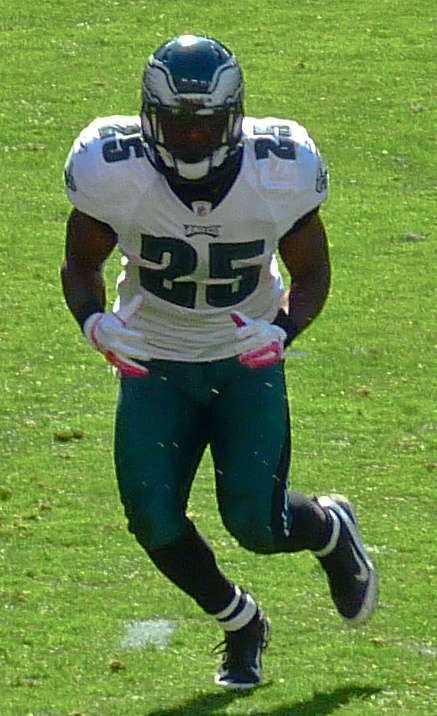
LeSean McCoy in 2011

=== 2011: "Dream Team" ===
The off-season was marred by a lockout that began in March after the NFL's collective bargaining agreement expired, making practices, trades, and free agency impossible. During the draft, the Eagles did comparatively little. After the lockout ended in July, the team embarked on a rash of high-profile free agent signings, including Raiders cornerback Nnamdi Asomugha, Dolphins running back Ronnie Brown, Giants wide receiver Steve Smith, Packers tight end Donald Lee, Titans defensive end Jason Babin, Packers defensive tackle Cullen Jenkins, and Cardinals cornerback Dominique Rodgers-Cromartie. Meanwhile, Kevin Kolb, displeased at losing the starting quarterback job to Michael Vick in 2010, was traded to Arizona for Rodgers-Cromartie. Replacing him as second-stringer was ex-Titans quarterback Vince Young. Young made a lot of hype by calling the Eagles the "Dream Team".

Although the Eagles won their 2011 opener against the St. Louis Rams, the Dream Team failed to deliver as Michael Vick fell victim to injuries and turnovers. The Eagles lost four straight games. With Vince Young taking over, the Eagles beat the Washington Redskins at last in Week 6. In Week 8, Vick returned to help crush the Dallas Cowboys at home 34–7. After further losses to the Chicago Bears and Arizona Cardinals, the Eagles beat the New York Giants and then fell to the New England Patriots and Seattle Seahawks before winning their final four matches and finishing 8–8.

=== 2012: End of the Reid era ===
The Eagles entered 2012 with strong hopes after winning their last 4 games of last season. When the team started 3–1, including a 24–23 victory over the eventual Super Bowl champion Baltimore Ravens, the fans were thinking playoffs, even Super Bowl. However, these hopes came to a crashing halt as the team lost their next 8 and 11 of their next 12 to finish 4–12, their worst record since 1998. After a Michael Vick injury in week 10 against the Dallas Cowboys, Nick Foles stepped in and made his Philadelphia debut. In week 14, at the Tampa Bay Buccaneers, rookie quarterback Nick Foles led his offense on a game winning touchdown drive, throwing a touchdown to Jeremy Maclin with 1 second left in the game to record his first win as an Eagle. The Eagles proceeded to fire Andy Reid, the longest-tenured and winningest coach in team history. Reid would later join the Kansas City Chiefs as head coach.

== The Chip Kelly era (2013–2015) ==
=== 2013: Immediate success ===
After the firing of Andy Reid, Chip Kelly was named head coach of the Eagles on January 16, 2013, after a successful four-year reign manning the sidelines at the University of Oregon. Kelly was known for his up tempo approach to football which helped him make the Oregon a premier college organization.

In his first season in professional football, Kelly produced a 10–6 record and an NFC East championship, becoming just the second head coach in league history to win a division title in his first season in the NFL. During the start of the season Michael Vick got injured, and backup Nick Foles took over. Nick Foles would become the surprise of the NFL as he would end the season with 27 touchdowns and only 2 interceptions with one game against the Oakland Raiders in which he threw for 7 touchdowns in one game, tying an NFL record. Along the way, the Eagles set a plethora of team records, including points (442), total net yards (6,676), touchdowns (53), passing yards (4,406) and fewest turnovers (19). The Eagles also set an NFL record with 99 plays of 20+ yards and became the first team since the 1991 Buffalo Bills to lead the league in rushing while ranking last in time of possession. Individually, running back LeSean McCoy set the franchise record for rushing yards and scrimmage yards in a season in 2013, while quarterback Nick Foles had the third best quarterback rating in NFL history in 2013. By week 17, the division race between the Dallas Cowboys and Eagles culminated to a must win, winner-takes-all, loser-goes-home Sunday night matchup between the Eagles and Cowboys in Dallas. After a hard-fought game, the game came down to the final two minutes, with the Cowboys down by 2 and having possession of the ball. However, not far into the potentially game-winning drive, cornerback Brandon Boykin intercepted an underthrown pass to win the game and the division. The Eagles proceeded to the playoffs for the first time since 2010. However, they would not make it far as they were defeated by the New Orleans Saints in the wild-card round of the playoffs. At the end of the game, the Saints made a game-winning field goal as time expired after a 7-minute drive drained the clock.

=== 2014: Dominance then collapse ===
In 2014, a lot of expectations were set on the team after what seemed like a successful first year for Chip Kelly. The Eagles started off as a force to be reckoned with, enjoying a 6–2 record with both losses having been on the road and ending with failed red zone attempts at game-winning touchdowns. Nick Foles' 2014 season would end during Week 9, however, where he broke his collarbone in a win against the Houston Texans. Mark Sanchez would take over for the rest of the season for the Eagles. They would collapse from their 9–3 record near the end of the season to go 10–6 again, but miss the playoffs due to losing their division to the Dallas Cowboys and tiebreakers. After beating the Cowboys on Thanksgiving Day to put themselves in good position to win the division, the Eagles then lost the next two, against the Seattle Seahawks and at home against the Cowboys to hand the division lead back to the Cowboys. Philadelphia had the 6th best record in the NFC, but the NFC South winners, the 7–8–1 Carolina Panthers, took a playoff spot for winning the division, thus leaving the 10–6 Eagles out of the playoffs.

=== 2015: End of Chip Kelly era ===
With the 2015 season, Chip Kelly was given full control which he used to revamp the roster into something he preferred. Offensive stalwarts such as LeSean McCoy, Jeremy Maclin, Nick Foles, and Evan Mathis were either traded, released, or not resigned, often to the chagrin of Eagles fans. The new quarterback of the Eagles was Sam Bradford. In a surprise free agent signing, Chip Kelly also acquired the previous season's rushing yard leader, DeMarco Murray, from the rival Dallas Cowboys. LeSean McCoy was traded for Kiko Alonso from the Buffalo Bills. Many changes were made with the offense to better fit Chip Kelly's fast-paced offense. The new roster did not work out as the Eagles would go 7–9, and miss the playoffs, however, this was in part due to an injury suffered by Sam Bradford in week 9 during a home game against the Dolphins. Weeks 9–11, in which the Eagles played vs. Dolphins, vs. Buccaneers, and at the Lions on Thanksgiving, were supposed to be the easiest stretch of the season for Philadelphia. In the 3rd quarter of the game against Miami, when the Eagles were leading, Sam Bradford exited the game with an injury that would sideline him for the remainder of that game and for the next two games. Mark Sanchez took his place and went on to throw an interception in the end zone in a potential game-winning TD drive. Sanchez's offense went on to be blown out in the next two games, scoring no more than 17 in each. Bradford came back in week 12, and beat the strong favorites, the New England Patriots, on the road. Kelly was fired as head coach with one game remaining on the season.

== The Doug Pederson era (2016–2020) ==
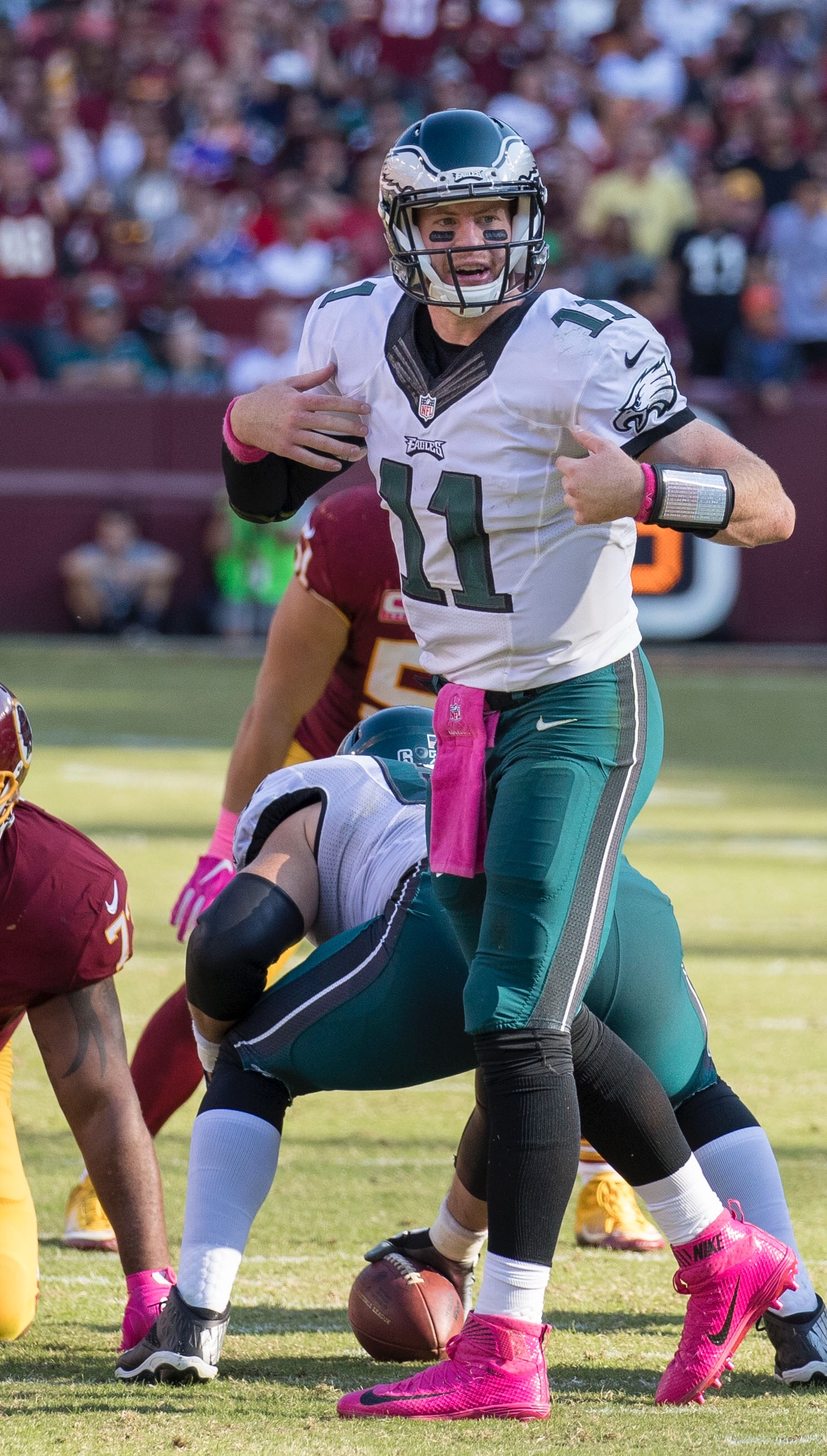
Carson Wentz in his rookie year

=== 2016: Carson Wentz and Doug Pederson's first year ===
After Chip Kelly, Doug Pederson was announced head coach on January 18, 2016, his first NFL head coaching job. The Eagles traded up for the second overall draft pick and chose North Dakota State quarterback Carson Wentz in the 2016 NFL draft. The season started off well for the Eagles when they went 3–0 to start the season (Doug Pederson would become the first head coach in franchise history to win their first three games). However, the lack of weapons for Carson Wentz and his lack of experience would catch up to them as the Eagles would go 4–9 in their final 13 games, and end the season 7–9 again and miss the playoffs.

=== 2017: First Super Bowl championship ===
During the offseason, a lot of changes were made in the receiving corps and running back position to help Wentz. This would end up working as the Eagles would soar to the top of the NFL with a 13–3 record which gave them their first NFC East Championship since 2013, and gave them a first round bye for the first time since the 2004 season which was the last time they last went to the Super Bowl. Carson Wentz improved drastically during the season in which he threw for 33 touchdowns and only 7 interceptions. His potential MVP season came to an end though during Week 14 against the Los Angeles Rams where he tore his ACL, and would be out for the rest of the year. After a 1–1 start, winning opening day against the Redskins and losing week 2 at the Chiefs, the Eagles won a close home opener against the Giants on a last second 61-yard field goal by rookie kicker Jake Elliott 27–24. This was the longest kick made by a rookie, and the longest made by an Eagle in franchise history. The Eagles extended this winning streak to 9, proving their spot at the top of the league, until week 13 where they lost at the Seattle Seahawks.

Nick Foles, who returned to the Eagles after having short stints with the Rams (then St. Louis Rams) and Chiefs (where Andy Reid was coaching), would take over. His shaky performances during the end of the regular season made the team become underdogs during the playoffs despite being the number one seed. The Eagles would beat the Atlanta Falcons 15–10 in the divisional round which was their first playoff win since the 2008 season. The divisional game in Atlanta ended with a 4th down stop at the goal line as Matt Ryan's pass sailed through star WR Julio Jones' hands (under Jalen Mills' coverage) after having been stopped on 1st, 2nd, and 3rd. The Eagles went on to face the Minnesota Vikings in the NFC Championship. The game would end up being a surprising blowout with the Eagles dominating the Vikings 38–7 to go to the Super Bowl for the first time since the 2004 season. The Eagles would face Tom Brady and the New England Patriots in a rematch of Super Bowl XXXIX at Super Bowl LII. The Eagles would end up winning the game 41–33 to give the Eagles their first Super Bowl Championship and their first championship since the 1960 season before the NFL–AFL merger. Nick Foles would be named Super Bowl MVP.

=== 2018: Attempting to repeat ===
The Eagles came back from a successful 2017 season hoping to become the first repeat Super Bowl victors since the New England Patriots during their 2003 and 2004 season. Before the season started many injuries plagued the team including their quarterback Carson Wentz who was still recovering from an ACL injury. Nick Foles would be the starting quarterback to begin the season and helped win the team their opening game against the Atlanta Falcons 18–12. The season opener against Atlanta ended in similar fashion as the previous year's divisional round matchup had; an incomplete pass to Julio Jones in the end zone to end the game. Throughout the 2018 season many injuries plagued the team, especially in their secondary like Jalen Mills, Ronald Darby, and Rodney McLeod. A feeling of complacency after winning the franchise's first Super Bowl championship (and 4th NFL championship) had set into the team and fanbase, giving them a lack of urgency through the beginning of the season. In many of the games in the beginning of the season, like those against Carolina and Tennessee for example, the Eagles had blown leads late in the 4th quarter. The Eagles had a 4–6 record in their first ten games and looked to have a very small chance of making the playoffs, but the Eagles managed to win 5 of their last 6 games which included upset victories over the Rams and Texans to go 9–7 and make the playoffs as the sixth seed. Carson Wentz, having been rushed back from his injury and playing too soon, was diagnosed with a stress fracture in his back after Week 14. Nick Foles filled in for Wentz late in the season yet again. The Eagles win against the Texans in week 16 was a close one; the Eagles were winning for most of the game, but fell apart towards the end in the 4th quarter, where they when the Texans took the lead with only a few minutes remaining to play. In the end, the Eagles drove down the field and Jake Elliott made a field goal to win the game. That set up a week 17 where the Eagles had to win in Washington and needed the Bears to beat the Vikings in order to clinch a playoff spot. The Eagles beat the Redskins comfortably, and the Bears beat the Vikings. The Bears had left in their starters throughout the whole game, even though, toward the end, the situation became so that their 3rd seed spot could not possibly change whether they won or lost. They did this because, among other reasons, they preferred to play the Eagles in the first round of the playoffs.

In the Wild Card game against the Chicago Bears, Nick Foles threw 2 touchdowns and 2 interceptions in a 16–15 win. Bears kicker Cody Parkey missed a game-winning field goal that hit the upright and crossbar. The kick was also tipped slightly by Treyvon Hester sending the Philadelphia Eagles to a NFC Divisional matchup against the New Orleans Saints. In the NFC Divisional Round match with the Saints, the Eagles ended the first quarter with a 14–0 lead. However, the offense would be unable to get any more points as the defense got pressure on Nick Foles and the Eagles would end up losing to the Saints 20–14, ending their opportunity to defend their Super Bowl championship. The Eagles attempted to go down the field to score a game winning touchdown, and were progressing well down the field, when at around the Saints' 20 yard line, Alshon Jeffery let a pass go through his hands and into Saints cornerback Marshon Lattimore’s arms.

=== 2019: Third consecutive playoff berth ===
In the offseason Nick Foles left Philadelphia to sign with the Jacksonville Jaguars. The Eagles also traded away Michael Bennett and a 2020 seventh-round pick to the New England Patriots for a 2020 fifth-round pick. One of the Eagles' most notable offseason addition was a trade with the Tampa Bay Buccaneers to reacquire DeSean Jackson. Other additions to the team included defensive tackle Malik Jackson and running back Jordan Howard.

The Eagles got off to a promising start with a Week 1 win against the Washington Redskins, in which DeSean Jackson caught two touchdowns from Carson Wentz of over 50 yards. However, the Eagles lost their next two games with major injuries to both their offense and defense. They defeated the then-undefeated Green Bay Packers in Week 4 and the New York Jets the following week but lost to the Minnesota Vikings in Week 6. In Week 7 the Eagles lost a game in Dallas that could have put them in a favorable position within the division. However, the Eagles went on to win two straight in Buffalo and at home against the Chicago Bears. After the bye week, the Eagles played the New England Patriots for the first time since Super Bowl LII. In a low scoring game, the Eagles blew a 10–0 early lead to lose 17–10.

The next week saw the Eagles lose 17–9 at home against the Seattle Seahawks, a game in which Carson Wentz threw a touchdown, 2 interceptions, and lost 2 fumbles. The Eagles' last 5 games are the easiest in the NFL, based on records. However, in the first of the last five games, week 13 the Eagles lost 37–31 in Miami to the Dolphins, who were 2–9 heading into the game. The Eagles had a 28–14 lead in the third quarter but failed to retain the lead as the Dolphins punted only once in the second half.

In the next two weeks, the Eagles beat the Giants at home on an overtime touchdown pass from Wentz to Ertz after coming back from a 17–3 halftime deficit, and then beat the Redskins in Washington 37–27 after Nigel Bradham sealed the game with a fumble return for a touchdown following a go-ahead touchdown pass by Greg Ward Jr. from Carson Wentz. In week 16, the Eagles played the Cowboys in Philadelphia having lost to Dallas in their previous four matchups. The Eagles jumped to a quick 10 point lead and held on to win 17–9, preventing the Cowboys from clinching the division. It was a crucial game against their longtime rivals, and heading into week 17 the Eagles needed either a win against the 3–11 Giants or a Cowboys loss to the Redskins to clinch the NFC East.

The Eagles headed into their week 17 matchup without Zach Ertz, their leading receiver who had broken a rib and suffered a lacerated kidney on a hit in the first quarter of the Cowboys game. Regardless, the Eagles broke away from the Giants in the third quarter with a touchdown following a fumble recovery by Fletcher Cox. Boston Scott, backup RB, scored three touchdowns in the 34–17 win, and the Eagles won the NFC East with a 9–7 record. The Eagles became the first team in NFL history to have a quarterback throw for more than 4,000 yards without having a wide receiver catch for more than 500 yards in a season.

Carson Wentz started his first postseason game at home against the 5th seeded Seahawks. In the 1st quarter, Wentz took a hit to the head by Jadeveon Clowney, which gave him a concussion that sidelined him for the rest of the game. Backup Josh McCown stepped in for Wentz, becoming the oldest quarterback to play their first playoff game. Although he led the offense on multiple drives to the end zone, the offense failed to convert two red zone 4th downs in the red zone in the 9–17 loss.

=== 2020: End of the Pederson–Wentz era ===
The Eagles started the 2020 season without any fans in attendance at home games, due to COVID precautions. The season saw some notable changes to the roster, including the addition of Jalen Hurts from the draft who was controversially selected in the second round, and the absence of Nelson Agholor due to free agency. The team still dealt with many injuries and poor quarterback play over the course of the year. The Eagles started week 1 at the Washington Football Team, formerly Washington Redskins, by jumping out to a 17–0 lead. The Football Team then scored 27 unanswered points in the second half to start the Eagles off with a 0–1 record. This was the first loss to the Washington Football Team for the Eagles since 2016. The next week, the Eagles lost to the Rams at home 37–19. In Week 3, The Eagles tied the Bengals at home after deciding to punt from the Bengals' 46 yard line, after a false start penalty was called before a 59-yard field goal attempt. The Eagles went to San Francisco to play the defending NFC Champs 49ers, where they won on Sunday night, 25–20. The Eagles lost the next two games against the Steelers and Ravens, mounting comebacks against the favorites by the ends of both games but not doing enough to win. The three games did, however, see the emergence of Travis Fulgham as a top receiver for the team, coming off of the practice squad to replace injured receivers. In the Ravens Week 6 game, the Eagles played with only two projected starters healthy, Jason Kelce and Carson Wentz. In their Week 7 matchup against the Giants, the Eagles were down 21–10 with 6 minutes to go in the game, but they came back and won 22–21. In their Week 8 matchup against the Cowboys, despite another poor performance from Wentz, the Eagles held on and defeated the Cowboys at home, on Sunday Night Football, 23–9. After the bye week, however, the Eagles would massively struggle, going 1–7 in their last 8 games. Their only win (in that period) was against the heavy favored Saints at home in Week 14, 24–21, when Jalen Hurts took over for Carson Wentz as starting quarterback. Wentz was benched in the middle of the Week 13 game on the road against the Green Bay Packers. At the time of his benching, Wentz led the league at sacks, interceptions, and turnovers. The Eagles were eliminated from playoff contention (for the first time since 2016) after a Week 16 loss on the road to the Cowboys, 37–17, after leading at the end of the 1st quarter, 14–3. They would then lose at home in Week 17 against Washington, 20–14, to end their season at 4–11–1 (their worst record since 2012), and on January 11, 2021, Pederson was eventually fired as head coach by the Eagles, ending his overall record (including playoff appearances) at 46–39–1. Finally, on March 17, 2021, Wentz was traded to the Indianapolis Colts in exchange for a 2021 third-round pick and a 2022 conditional second-round pick.

== The Sirianni era (2021–present) ==
=== 2021: A new quarterback and the playoffs ===
The Eagles began their 2021 season with a new starter quarterback, Jalen Hurts, and a new head coach, Nick Sirianni, who had previously worked for the Indianapolis Colts as offensive coordinator, coming to the Eagles for his first head coaching job. The team started the season with a record of 3–6, and managed to finish it 9–8 after adopting a more run-heavy offense, which helped reaching the playoffs for the fourth time in five years. However, the Eagles lost to the Tampa Bay Buccaneers 31–15 in the NFC Wild Card round.

=== 2022: A. J. Brown ===
In the 2022 draft, the Eagles traded a first-round pick and a third-round compensatory pick to the Titans to get star wide receiver A. J. Brown. The Eagles went 14–3 in the regular season again reaching the playoffs, then they beat the New York Giants (38–7) in the NFC Divisional round and the San Francisco 49ers (31–7) in the NFC Championship Game making it to Super Bowl LVII, which they lost to the Kansas City Chiefs 38–35.

=== 2023: Aspirations into collapse ===
Looking to expand off their previous Super Bowl berth, they started the 2023 season extremely strong with a 10–1 start. Jalen Hurts helped the team reaching such record throwing 224/327 (68.5%) and completing 15 passing touchdowns, 9 rushing touchdowns, 2,497 yards passing (345 rushing), with only 9 interceptions. He was then selected for the 2024 Pro Bowl for his performances for the Eagles. This strong start was aided on the defensive line with Georgia's star defensive tackle Jalen Carter, controversially selecting him 9th overall in the 2023 draft. He recorded 33 combined tackles, six sacks, two forced fumbles (and one returned for a touchdown). This would be enough to earn him PFWA NFL All-Rookie Team honors. However, despite starting off well, they only won one more game the rest of the season, ending with a record of 11–6. This was still enough to make it into the playoffs, wherein they would lose to the Tampa Bay Buccaneers 32–9 in the Wild Card round. They would then fire both offensive coordinator Brian Johnson and defensive coordinator Sean Desai. Longtime center Jason Kelce and defensive tackle Fletcher Cox would promptly retire that same offseason.

=== 2024: Second Super Bowl championship ===
Philadelphia acquired free agent Saquon Barkley during the offseason, who would notably become the ninth running back in NFL history to rush for 2,000 yards. Despite a turnover-plagued 2–2 start, the Eagles would correct course after their Week 5 bye, winning 12 of their last 13 regular season games. Following a Week 15 win over their instate rival Pittsburgh Steelers, the Eagles won 10 consecutive games for the first time in franchise history. In Week 17, the Eagles clinched the NFC East and with that win, swept the Dallas Cowboys for the first time since 2011. After playoff wins over the Green Bay Packers, Los Angeles Rams, and Washington Commanders, the Eagles would advance to Super Bowl LIX. In a rematch of Super Bowl LVII two years prior, the Eagles defeated the two-time defending champion Chiefs by a score of 40-22. The victory prevented Kansas City from winning three consecutive Super Bowls. During this playoff run, the Eagles also achieved an all-time winning record for the first time in franchise history.

=== 2025: First repeat NFC East title in 21 years ===
The Eagles started with an undefeated 4–0 record. After a Week 16 29–16 win over NFC East rival Washington Commanders, the Eagles became the first team since the 2004 team to repeat as NFC East champions. After losing two weeks later to the Commanders, they would finish with an 11–6 record and the NFC's #3 seed. The Eagles then lost to the #6 seeded San Francisco 49ers in the Wild Card round of the NFL playoffs.

== Bibliography ==
- Didinger, Ray; with Lyons, Robert S. (2005). The Eagles Encyclopedia. Philadelphia: Temple University Press. ISBN 1-59213-449-1
- NFL Editors (2011). NFL Record & Fact Book 2011: The Official National Football League Record and Fact Book Time Home Entertainment ISBN 978-1-60320-887-1
