= Susan Tose Spencer =

American football executive (1941–2025)

Personal information
- Born: August 1, 1941; Newark, New Jersey, U.S.
- Died: March 24, 2025 (aged 83); Charlotte, North Carolina, U.S.

Career information
- College: Boston University; Hofstra University; Villanova University School of Law

Career history
- Philadelphia Eagles (1980–1982) Legal counsel; Philadelphia Eagles (1982–1985) Vice president and general counsel
- Executive profile at Pro Football Reference

Susan Tose Spencer (August 1, 1941 – March 24, 2025) was an American businesswoman and lawyer who was vice president of the Philadelphia Eagles.

== Early life ==
Born in Newark, New Jersey, on August 1, 1941, Spencer was one of two daughters of Leonard Tose and his first wife, Jayne Esther Orensten (1919–2012). After graduating from Boston University, Spencer married Ira Schneider, who worked in public relations. They had one daughter. Spencer earned a Master's degree in Education/Economics from Hofstra University and spent five years as a junior high school teacher in East Meadow, New York. In 1971, following her divorce from Schneider, Spencer moved to Lighthouse Point, Florida, where she started a business designing, manufacturing, and selling tennis dresses. The business ended due to a disagreement between Spencer and her business partner Dennis Kalodish.

== Philadelphia Eagles ==
At the age of 35, Spencer, who had married sporting-goods salesman Harold Fletcher, began attending Villanova University School of Law. While a student she also served as a paralegal for Joseph Alioto, who was representing her father in an antitrust lawsuit. After graduating she joined the firm of Astor, Weiss, and Newman and served as a legal counsel for the Philadelphia Eagles, which were owned by her father. Spencer advised the team on stadium leases, grievances, arbitration cases, and the structuring of player contracts and represented the organization before the Philadelphia City Council during public hearings regarding the city's lease with the Philadelphia Stars of the rival United States Football League. In 1982 she was promoted to vice president.

The 1982 NFL strike cost the Eagles revenue from seven games and placed the team in a difficult financial situation. Shortly after the season ended, Spencer took over the day-to-day operations of the team. She worked to cut expenses in an effort to make the team more appealing to potential minority partners (The club had $33 million in liabilities and Tose personally owed creditors $9.1 million). Cost-saving measures introduced by Spencer included installing a time clock, eliminating the media's pregame buffet and the steak and seafood Monday afternoon brunch, and replacing the team's jumbo jet with a smaller plane. She also dismissed a number of longtime employees, including general manager Jim Murray, business manager Jim Borden, sales and marketing director Sam Procopio, assistant ticket manager Bob Ellis, secretary Gertrude Kelly, and Barbara Meindl who oversaw the Eagle's charitable fundraising. Spencer inherited Murray's duties as general manager, although head coach Marion Campbell oversaw football operations.

On June 17, 1983, Tose signed an agreement to sell the team to a group led by Louis Guida that also included Spencer, Ira Lampert, Dr. Julius Newman, and Sandra Schultz Newman. Tose backed out of the deal in order to get a higher price from Ed Snider. However, Guida's group was able to secure a restraining order on Tose and Spencer that prevented them from making any financial deals affecting the Eagles as well as an injunction that forced them to negotiate with Guida's group on sale agreement. The parties were unable to reach an agreement and Tose paid a $1.75 million settlement which allowed him to retain ownership of the Eagles. The Eagles finished the 1983 season with a 5–11 record.

Prior to the 1984 season, the Eagles traded Carl Hairston and Frank LeMaster and let go of Guy Morriss in what were seen as cost-cutting moves. However, Spencer also negotiated large contracts with Kenny Jackson, Ray Ellis, and Greg Brown. The 1984 season was the Eagles' first profitable season in many years, although the profit was only $200,000. That December, Tose considered moving the Eagles to Phoenix, Arizona as a condition of a sale of a minority share of the team to Canadian businessman James Monaghan. Philadelphia Mayor Wilson Goode was able to reach an agreement with Spencer to keep the team in Philadelphia long-term.

In February 1985, Harry Gamble, who had served as administrative assistant for coaching and player personnel and director of football administration following the firing of Jim Murray, was promoted to general manager. Two months later the Eagles were sold to Miami car dealer Norman Braman. As part of the sale, Spencer was to stay with the Eagles as an assistant to Gamble, however she chose to resign on May 1, 1985, two days after the sale became final.

== Post-NFL ==
After leaving the NFL, she married her third husband, Bob Spencer, who predeceased her after 26 years of marriage. She went into the meat processing business, working as a meat commodities trader, small-business consultant, and lecturer. She also hosted an internet radio show and authored a business self-help book for women. She lived in Las Vegas to be near her mother.

In 2018, she was diagnosed with Alzheimer's disease and moved to North Carolina to be closer to her daughter. On March 24, 2025, she died due to complications from Alzhhimer's disease at the age of 83 at an assisted care facility in Charlotte, North Carolina.
