= Leonard Tose =

American sports businessman (1915–2003)

- Tose in 1984
- Born: Leonard Hyman Tose; March 6, 1915; Bridgeport, Pennsylvania, U.S.
- Died: April 15, 2003 (aged 88); Philadelphia, Pennsylvania, U.S.
- Occupation: Owner
- Organization: Philadelphia Eagles (1969–1985)
- Spouse(s): Jayne Esther Orensten (divorced); Andrea Tose (divorced); Caroline Collum (divorced); Julia Farber (divorced)
- Children: with Orenstein: Susan Tose Spencer and Nan Tose Schwartz

Leonard Hyman Tose (March 6, 1915 – April 15, 2003) was an owner of the Philadelphia Eagles from 1969 to 1985. He made a fortune in the trucking industry and was known for his lavish lifestyle but he eventually lost it all due to a gambling addiction and alcoholism.

== Early life ==
Tose's father, a Russian Jewish immigrant to the United States, settled outside Philadelphia, where he was a peddler with a pack on his back. He launched a trucking business, owning ten trucks, which represented the beginning of the Tose family business, Tose Inc. The company ultimately owned more than 700 trucks and grossed $20 million a year.

Tose was born in Bridgeport, Pennsylvania and graduated from the University of Notre Dame in 1937.

== Career ==
=== Philadelphia Eagles owner ===
A lifelong fan of the Philadelphia Eagles, Tose invested in the Eagles as a member of the "Happy Hundred," a group led by James P. Clark. Tose invested $3,000 as one of the one hundred owners to purchase the team from Alexis Thompson on January 15, 1949. Tose tried to buy the team with his own group of investors in 1956, but was unable to do so. The team was bought in December 1963 by Jerry Wolman for $5,505,000 and Tose received more than $60,000. He bought the team from Wolman in 1969 for $16,155,000, then a record for a professional sports franchise. Tose's first official act was to fire head coach Joe Kuharich. He followed this by naming former Eagles receiving great Pete Retzlaff as general manager and Jerry Williams as coach.

In 1976, he, along with General Manager Jimmy Murray, lured Dick Vermeil from UCLA to coach the hapless Eagles, who had one winning season from 1962 to 1975. Vermeil's 1980 team lost to Oakland in the Super Bowl.

The 1982 NFL strike cost the Eagles revenue from seven games and placed the team, which was already in debt, in a difficult financial situation. Shortly after the season ended, Tose's daughter, Susan Tose Fletcher, took over the day-to-day operations of the team from Murray. In 1985, after attempts to move the franchise to Phoenix, Arizona and/or trade franchises with Buffalo Bills owner Ralph Wilson failed, Tose was forced to sell the Eagles to Florida automobile dealers Norman Braman and Ed Leibowitz for a reported $65 million to pay off his more than $25 million in gambling debts at Atlantic City casinos.

== Personal life ==
=== Compulsive gambling ===
In 1991, the Sands Atlantic City sued Tose for $1.23 million in gambling debts. He countersued, contending that the casino got him too drunk to know what he was doing. Eventually, the casino won. There was testimony from a cocktail waitress swearing that her job description was "to keep Mr. Tose's glass filled." The casino provided a monogrammed glass which she was instructed to keep filled with top-shelf scotch.

In the end, Tose lost (by his estimate), more than $20 million at Resorts Atlantic City and $14 million at the Sands. In 1996, on his 81st birthday, Tose was evicted from his seven-bedroom Villanova mansion after losing the house in a U.S. Marshal's sale.

In 1999, Tose told a congressional hearing on compulsive gambling that his losses totaled between $40 and $50 million. He spent his last years alone in a downtown hotel room after his home in the upscale Philadelphia Main Line was confiscated for unpaid taxes.

=== Marriages and family ===
Tose was married five times. His first wife was Jayne Ester Orensten, who was also Jewish. They had two daughters, Nan Tose Schwartz and Susan Tose Fletcher. His second wife was Andrea Tose; they divorced in 1981.

In 1981, he married his third wife, former stewardess Caroline Collum, who used to be in charge of the Eagle cheerleaders (then known as the Liberty Belles). They divorced and she then married I.G. "Jack" Davis, the former president of Resorts International, and she later married Sidney Kimmel, founder of Jones Apparel Group. His fourth wife was Julia Farber of Cherry Hill, New Jersey. He and the fourth of his five wives had matching Rolls-Royces. Tose flew to Eagles home games in a helicopter, was married aboard Queen Elizabeth 2, and fed reporters filet mignon and shrimp cocktail.

During his tenure as owner of the Philadelphia Eagles, Tose was instrumental in helping establish the first Ronald McDonald House. Together with general manager Jim Murray and Eagles player Fred Hill, whose daughter had leukemia, Dr. Audrey Evans, and McDonald's regional manager Ed Rensi, a house was established for families to stay when their children received treatment for pediatric cancers. The house was financed by proceeds from sales of Shamrock Shakes throughout the Philadelphia area.

== Death ==
Tose died in his sleep in the hospice wing of St. Agnes Medical Center in Philadelphia on April 15, 2003. He was 88. No cause of death was released. An obituary by Dan Dunkin captured his life, "To put Leonard Tose's life in football terms, he threw on every down."

== See also ==
- History of the Philadelphia Eagles
