= Norman Braman =

American businessman (born 1932)

- Born: August 23, 1932 (age 94); West Chester, Pennsylvania, U.S.
- Education: Temple University
- Occupation: Car dealer
- Known for: Owner of the Philadelphia Eagles from 1985–1994
- Spouse: Irma Miller
- Children: 2 daughters

Norman Braman (born August 23, 1932) is an American billionaire car dealer, art collector, and former owner of the Philadelphia Eagles.

== Early life and education ==
Braman was born in 1932 in West Chester, Pennsylvania, and grew up in the Cobbs Creek section of Philadelphia, where his father owned a barbershop. Braman's parents were Jewish immigrants from Europe. His Romanian-born mother was a seamstress and his Polish father a barber. Braman was a water boy in his teenage years at the Eagles training camp, which was then in Hershey, Pennsylvania. During the season, he would sneak into Shibe Park to watch the team play. Braman attended West Philadelphia High School and graduated from Temple University in 1955 with a degree in business administration.

== Career ==
Braman began his career as a market research analyst for Seagram's Distributors in 1955. A few years later he took an executive position at Bargaintown U.S.A., a company owned by his father-in-law, in Lebanon, Pennsylvania. The business eventually became Keystone Discount Stores, a chain of self-service variety stores in the Philadelphia area. In the mid-1960s he spearheaded a merger between Keystone and Philadelphia Laboratories to create Philadelphia Pharmaceuticals and Cosmetics. Braman was appointed president and CEO of the new company. Acquisitions under his tenure at PP&C included Vitamix Pharmaceuticals, F.A. Martin and Company, and U.S. Cocoa Corporation. Braman stepped down from his position at Philadelphia Pharmaceuticals and Cosmetics in 1969 to pursue other interests.

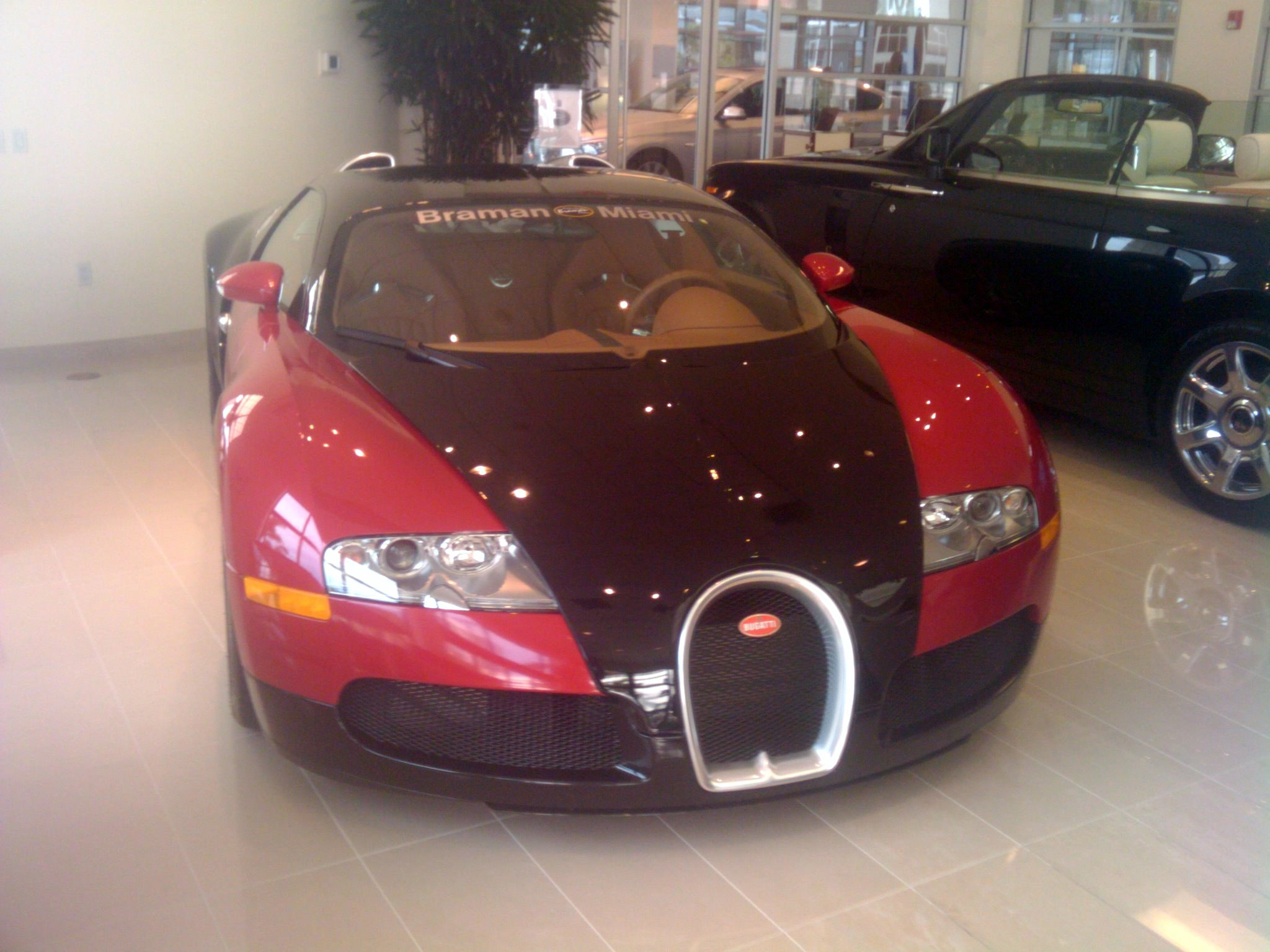
A Bugatti Veyron sits in the showroom at one of Braman's Miami dealerships

Braman got his start in the automobile business in 1972 when he acquired controlling interest of Sharpe-Taylor Cadillac in Tampa, Florida. During these early years, Braman was mentored by well-known car dealer and fellow Philadelphia native Victor Potamkin. In 1975, Braman bought the former Nolan Brown Cadillac in Miami, Florida. The following year, Braman took on his first import brands with the purchase of BMW and Rolls-Royce dealership C.R. Berry Motors and moved both franchises next to his Miami Cadillac dealership. By 1980, Braman had Cadillac, BMW, Rolls-Royce, Fiat, Lancia, and Toyota dealerships along the 2000 block of Biscayne Boulevard in Miami.

While continuing to expand his dealership holdings in the South Florida area, Braman also added dealerships in Colorado. Today, Braman serves as chairman of Braman Management Association, an umbrella company for his automotive businesses that include dealerships in Florida and Colorado selling Acura, Audi, Bentley, BMW, Bugatti, Cadillac, Genesis, Honda, Hyundai, Mercedes-Benz, MINI, Porsche and Rolls-Royce.

In addition to his retail automotive businesses, Braman had majority ownership of Austin Rover Cars of North America (ARCONA), the distributorship for Sterling automobiles imported to the United States starting in 1987. The company's name was changed to Sterling Motor Cars in 1989 and closed in 1991 after sales of the Rover 800-based Sterling 825/827 models failed to meet expectations.

As of May 2026, Forbes estimated his net worth at US$3.9 billion.

== Philadelphia Eagles ==
Braman and his brother-in-law, Ed Leibowitz, became owners of the Philadelphia Eagles in April 1985 having acquired them from Leonard Tose for a reported $65 million. Initially, Braman owned 65% of the team while Leibowitz owned 35%. In July 1986, Braman bought out Leibowitz's interest. During Braman's ownership, the Eagles made playoff appearances in 1988, 1989, 1990 and 1992. They were NFC East division champions in 1988. Despite the talent of the team, which at one time included players such as Keith Jackson, Reggie White, Eric Allen, and Seth Joyner, the Eagles failed to reach the Super Bowl with Braman as an owner. The 1993 offseason saw him allow free agents to leave to sign with other teams, with White signing a four-year deal with the Green Bay Packers (days later, the Eagles signed Tim Harris to a three-year, $4.7 million deal), with White later remarking he wished could've had the opportunity to retire in Philadelphia. Joyner once described Braman as only concerned with money rather than winning.

It was Braman that elected to fire Buddy Ryan in January 1991 and replace him with offensive coordinator Rich Kotite (who Joyner once described as a "puppet" for Braman), reportedly in part because quarterback Randall Cunningham lobbied Braman for it (the only other candidate considered by Braman was defensive coordinator Jeff Fisher). As early as 1987, Braman had thought of firing Ryan (who he chose over candidates David Shula and Jim Mora) due to his uncompromising nature as a coach with total roster control, particularly as Ryan backed the players in the strike that year while focusing little on constructing the replacement player roster that proceeded to go 0–3. When Braman announced the move to fire Ryan in 1991, he stated, "It is time to stop being a bridesmaid and become a bride." Notably, Braman charged players for the equipment they wore (whereas other teams simply gave it to players for free), which went with high team profits at the expense of marginal spending on training camp or scouting.

On April 6, 1994, Braman agreed to sell the team to a group led by movie producer Jeffrey Lurie. The reported selling price was $185 million, a record for a sports team franchise at that time. Never a fulltime resident in Philadelphia, Braman remarked at the time of the announcement, "I live in Miami and traveling the 16 weeks in the fall -- well, there's more to life than the National Football League."

== Politics ==
Ronald Reagan nominated Braman to lead Immigration and Naturalization Services in September 1981. In November 1981, before Senatorial hearings began, Braman withdrew his nomination, citing the need to focus on his businesses.

He financially supported a recall election against Miami-Dade Mayor Carlos Alvarez because of a huge property tax increase and pay hikes to Alvarez's top staffers. On March 15, 2011, close to 90% of those who turned out to vote that day in Miami-Dade County, voted to recall the mayor. It is believed to be one of the most lopsided recall elections in the history of American elections.

In 2012, Braman established political groups to campaign against four incumbent Miami-Dade County commissioners with $440,000 in funding, focusing on the commissioners' support for the controversial Marlins Park project and a property tax hike in 2010.

Braman was a supporter of Marco Rubio, and was considering spending anywhere between US$10 million to US$25 million in support of his 2016 presidential campaign. According to the acknowledgements in his autobiography, Rubio has thanked Braman for being a supporter, and Braman has employed at one time or another Marco Rubio's wife, Jeanette Dousdebes Rubio, at the Braman family's charitable foundation.

== Philanthropy ==
Braman and his wife, Irma, established the Norman and Irma Braman Family Foundation, which primarily helps fund medical and educational projects throughout the world.

Braman, an art collector, also serves as president of the Irma and Norman Braman Art Foundation, which supports the arts and culture in and around the Miami area.

== Personal life ==
Braman is married to Irma Braman (née Miller). They have two daughters: Debra Wechsler and Suzi Lustgarten.
