= Jim Murray (American football) =

American football executive

Personal information
- Born: June 5, 1938; Philadelphia, Pennsylvania, U.S.
- Died: August 25, 2025 (aged 87); Bryn Mawr, Pennsylvania, U.S.

Career information
- College: Villanova University

Career history
- Philadelphia Eagles (1973–1982) General manager
- Executive profile at Pro Football Reference

James Joseph Murray (June 5, 1938 – August 25, 2025) was an American professional football executive who was the co-founder of the Ronald McDonald House and a general manager of the Philadelphia Eagles of the National Football League (NFL). A native of West Philadelphia, he was also president of Jim Murray Ltd, a sports promotion and marketing firm.

== Background ==
Murray was born into an Irish Catholic family in West Philadelphia on June 5, 1938. He was raised in a rowhouse in West Philadelphia, Pennsylvania. Murray attended Our Mother of Sorrows Parish grade school and West Philadelphia Catholic High School. He and his brother Francis W. "Fran" Murray were athletic. Jim Murray graduated from Villanova University in 1960.

Murray and his wife, Dianne, resided in Rosemont, Pennsylvania. They had five children and five grandchildren. He died in Bryn Mawr, Pennsylvania on August 25, 2025, at the age of 87.

== Career ==
Murray began his career in sports administration with the Tidewater Tides of baseball's South Atlantic League. After a tour of active duty with the Marine Corps Reserve, he returned to baseball as assistant general manager of the Atlanta Crackers, an affiliate of the St. Louis Cardinals. In 1964, he left baseball to enter the restaurant business. He returned in 1966 to his alma mater, Villanova University, as its sports information director.

In 1969, he joined the professional football team Philadelphia Eagles' public relations staff and became the NFL team's administrative assistant two years later. In 1974, five years after joining the organization, Murray was named general manager for the team. For more than nine years, Murray served as general manager which included significant improvement in the team, as evidenced by its appearances in playoff games and a Super Bowl. In 1976, he and owner Leonard Tose hired Dick Vermeil as head coach. Murray was fired after the 1982 season and succeeded by Tose's daughter, Susan Tose Fletcher.

== Film and television ==
Murray's company has produced the local television show Eagles Cheers.

He appears in interviews on numerous NFL Films Productions about the Philadelphia Eagles.

Murray's nephew T. Patrick Murray (son of his brother Fran) is a filmmaker who produced The Last Game, a football documentary film for ESPN.

== Charity work ==
During his 14 years with the Eagles, Murray assumed leadership roles in a number of community projects. He helped start the successful Eagles Fly for Leukemia campaign and co-founded with Dr. Audrey Evans the first Ronald McDonald House, located in Philadelphia. Murray persuaded many of his peers in the NFL to become involved in the unique Ronald McDonald House concept.

== Awards ==
Murray received numerous honors and awards, including:

- Leonard Tose Award (2002), first awardee
- American Medical Association's Citizen of the Year Award (1999)
- American Legion Distinguished Service Award (1992)
- Pennsylvania Sports Hall of Fame Philadelphia City All-Star Chapter (inducted 1992)
- President Ronald Reagan's Medal for Volunteers of America (1987)
- Bakers Club of Philadelphia's Bert Bell Man of the Year Award (1983)
- Catholic Leadership Institute's Award for Outstanding Catholic Leadership (2005)
- The American Catholic Historical Society's Commodore John Barry Award (1996)

== See also ==
- Vince Papale
