= 1981 San Francisco 49ers season =

American football team season

- Owner: Edward J. DeBartolo Jr.
- General manager: Bill Walsh
- Head coach: Bill Walsh
- Defensive coordinator: Chuck Studley
- Home stadium: Candlestick Park

Results
- Record: 13–3
- Division place: 1st NFC West
- Playoffs: Won Divisional Playoffs (vs. Giants) 38–24; Won NFC Championship (vs. Cowboys) 28–27; Won Super Bowl XVI (vs. Bengals) 26–21

Uniform
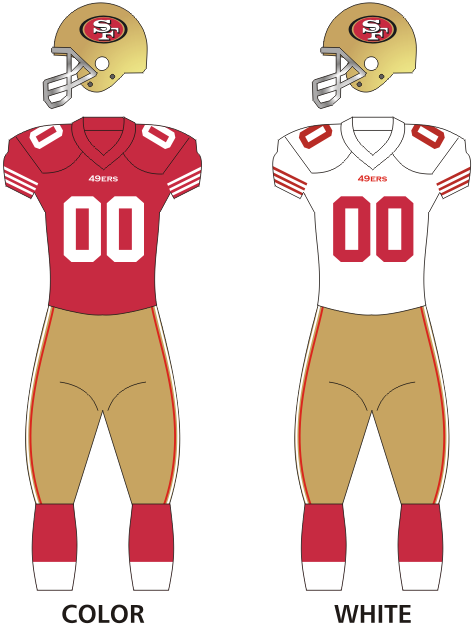

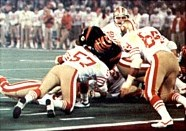
The 49ers playing against the Bengals in Super Bowl XVI.

The 1981 San Francisco 49ers season was the franchise's 32nd season in the National Football League (NFL), their 36th overall and their third under head coach Bill Walsh.

The 49ers were 13–3 in the regular season for their first winning season in five years and first playoff appearance in nine years. The franchise's most successful season to date, it was considered to be "the birth of a dynasty", when the 49ers began a decade of dominance over much of the NFL. The 49ers drew an average home attendance of 54,398 in the 1981 season.

The 49ers won Super Bowl XVI, defeating the AFC Champion Cincinnati Bengals 26–21. It was the first of five Super Bowl victories in franchise history, all within the next thirteen seasons. From 1981 to 1997, the 49ers would have thirteen NFC West titles, eight NFC top seeds, and seven seasons with the NFL's best regular season record.

Third-year quarterback Joe Montana began the 1981 season as the starter, and produced two fourth-quarter comeback victories. His signature game of the season was the NFC Championship Game, which culminated in "The Catch", a last-minute touchdown pass from Montana to Dwight Clark, propelling the 49ers to victory over Dallas and a berth in their first Super Bowl. The 49ers were undefeated in their first five Super Bowls.

NFL Films produced a documentary about the team's season entitled A Very Special Team; it was narrated by John Facenda. On March 23, 2007, NFL Network aired America's Game: The Super Bowl Champions, the 1981 San Francisco 49ers, with team commentary from Dwight Clark, Ronnie Lott and Randy Cross, and narrated by Gene Hackman.

== Offseason ==
=== NFL draft ===
A turning point for the franchise was the drafting of safety Ronnie Lott from the University of Southern California, later inducted into the Pro Football Hall of Fame. In addition, they also drafted cornerback Eric Wright from Missouri and safety Carlton Williamson from Pittsburgh.

1981 San Francisco 49ers draft
Round	Selection	Player	Position	College	Notes
1	8	Ronnie Lott	CB	USC	
2	36	John Harty	DT	Iowa	from Washington
2	Traded to the Bears				
2	40	Eric Wright	CB	Missouri	from Chicago
3	65	Carlton Williamson	SS	Pittsburgh	
4	Traded to the Cowboys				
5	121	Lynn Thomas	CB	Pittsburgh	
5	122	Arrington Jones	RB	Winston-Salem State	from Chicago
6	147	Pete Kugler	DT	Penn State	
7	Traded to the Eagles				
8	203	Garry White	RB	Minnesota	
9	Traded to the Bengals				
10	Traded to the Colts				
11	286	Ron DeBose	TE	UCLA	
12	313	Major Ogilvie	RB	Alabama	
12	322	Joe Adams	QB	Tennessee State	from Pittsburgh

== Training camp ==
The 1981 San Francisco 49ers season held training camp at Red Morten Park in Redwood City, California.

== Personnel ==
=== Staff ===
1981 San Francisco 49ers staff
Front office: Owner and President – Edward J. DeBartolo, Jr.; General manager – Bill Walsh; Director of Football Operations – John McVay; Director of College Scouting – Tony Razzano; Head coaches: Head Coach – Bill Walsh; Offensive coaches: Quarterbacks – Sam Wyche; Running Backs – Billie Matthews; Receivers – Milt Jackson; Offensive Line – Bobb McKittrick; Assistant Offensive Line – Cas Banaszek	Defensive coaches: Defensive Coordinator – Chuck Studley; Defensive Line – Bill McPherson; Linebackers – Norb Hecker; Defensive Backs – George Seifert; Assistant Defensive Backs – Ray Rhodes; Special teams coaches: Special Teams – Milt Jackson; Strength and conditioning: Strength and Conditioning – Al Vermeil

=== Roster ===
1981 San Francisco 49ers roster
Quarterbacks (QB): 7 Guy Benjamin; 16 Joe Montana; Running backs (RB): 49 Earl Cooper; 38 Johnny Davis; 31 Walt Easley; 36 Paul Hofer; 20 Amos Lawrence; 32 Ricky Patton; 30 Bill Ring; Wide receivers (WR): 87 Dwight Clark; 84 Mike Shumann; 88 Freddie Solomon; 85 Mike Wilson; Tight ends (TE): 80 Eason Ramson; 86 Charle Young	Offensive linemen (OL): 61 Dan Audick T; 68 John Ayers G; 60 John Choma G/C; 51 Randy Cross G; 62 Walt Downing C/G; 71 Keith Fahnhorst T; 66 Allan Kennedy T; 56 Fred Quillan C; Defensive linemen (DL): 76 Dwaine Board DE; 74 Fred Dean DE; 75 John Harty NT; 65 Lawrence Pillers DE; 78 Archie Reese NT; 79 Jim Stuckey DE	Linebackers (LB): 57 Dan Bunz ILB; 59 Willie Harper OLB; 52 Bobby Leopold OLB; 53 Milt McColl OLB; 54 Craig Puki ILB; 64 Jack Reynolds ILB; 58 Keena Turner OLB; Defensive backs (DB): 24 Rick Gervais FS; 22 Dwight Hicks FS; 42 Ronnie Lott CB; 29 Saladin Martin CB; 28 Lynn Thomas CB; 27 Carlton Williamson SS; 21 Eric Wright CB; Special teams (ST): 3 Jim Miller P; 14 Ray Wersching K	Reserve: 72 Ken Bungarda T (IR); 33 Ricky Churchman S (IR); 35 Lenvil Elliott RB (IR); 48 Phil Francis RB (IR); -- Ed Judie LB (IR); 77 Pete Kugler NT (IR); 26 Ray Rhodes CB (Ret.); 90 George Visger DT (IR); Rookies in italics

== Preseason ==
=== Schedule ===
Week	Date	Opponent	Result	Record	Venue	Attendance	Recap
1	August 5	at Seattle Seahawks	W 27–24 (OT)	1–0	Kingdome	56,958	Recap
2	August 15	San Diego Chargers	L 28–31	1–1	Candlestick Park	41,667	Recap
3	August 22	Seattle Seahawks	W 24–22	2–1	Candlestick Park	37,563	Recap
4	August 29	at Oakland Raiders	L 7–21	2–2	Oakland–Alameda County Coliseum	51,192	Recap

== Preseason Game summaries ==
=== Week P1 (Wednesday, August 5, 1981): at Seattle Seahawks ===
Preseason Week 1: San Francisco 49ers at Seattle Seahawks – Game summary

Quarter	1	2	3	4	OT	Total
49ers (1–0)	7	7	3	7	3	27
Seahawks (0–1)	7	3	0	14	0	24

at The Kingdome • Seattle, Washington

- Date: August 5, 1981
- Game time: 7:30 p.m. PDT
- Game weather: indoors
- Game attendance: 56,958
- TV announcers (KPIX-TV): Bob Waller (play-by-play) and Wayne Walker (color commentator)

Team	Category	Player	Statistics
SF	Passing		
SF	Rushing		
SF	Receiving		
SEA	Passing		
SEA	Rushing		
SEA	Receiving		

Scoring summary

Quarter	Time	Drive			Team	Scoring information	Score	
Quarter	Time	Plays	Yards	TOP	Team	Scoring information	SF	SEA
"TOP" = time of possession. For other American football terms, see Glossary of American football.							27	24

- Point spread:
- Over/under:
- Time of game:

49ers	Game Statistics	Seahawks
	First downs	
	Rushes–yards	
	Passing yards	
	Passes	
	Sacked–yards	
	Net passing yards	
	Total yards	
	Return yards	
	Punts	
	Fumbles–lost	
	Penalties–yards	
	Time of possession	

=== Week P2 (Saturday, August 15, 1981): vs. San Diego Chargers ===
Preseason Week 2: San Diego Chargers at San Francisco 49ers – Game summary

Quarter	1	2	3	4	Total
Chargers (1–1)	0	7	7	17	31
49ers (1–1)	0	7	7	14	28

at Candlestick Park • San Francisco, California

- Date: August 15, 1981
- Game time: 6:00 p.m. PDT
- Game attendance: 41,667
- TV announcers (KPIX-TV): Bob Waller (play-by-play) and Wayne Walker (color commentator)

Team	Category	Player	Statistics
SD	Passing		
SD	Rushing		
SD	Receiving		
SF	Passing		
SF	Rushing		
SF	Receiving		

Scoring summary

Quarter	Time	Drive			Team	Scoring information	Score	
Quarter	Time	Plays	Yards	TOP	Team	Scoring information	SD	SF
2					Chargers	Muncie 1-yard touchdown run, Benirschke kick good	7	0
2					49ers	Solomon 5-yard touchdown reception from DeBerg, Wersching kick good	7	7
3					49ers	Benjamin 1-yard touchdown run, Wersching kick good	7	14
3					Chargers	Brooks 28-yard touchdown reception from Luther, Benirschke kick good	14	14
4					Chargers	30-yard field goal by Benirschke	17	14
4					Chargers	Luther 1-yard touchdown run, Benirschke kick good	24	14
4					49ers	Solomon 10-yard touchdown reception from Benjamin, Wersching kick good	24	21
4					49ers	Solomon 13-yard touchdown reception from Benjamin, Wersching kick good	24	28
4					Chargers	Scales 73-yard touchdown reception from Luther, Benirschke kick good	31	28
"TOP" = time of possession. For other American football terms, see Glossary of American football.							31	28

- Point spread:
- Over/under:
- Time of game:

Chargers	Game Statistics	49ers
	First downs	
	Rushes–yards	
	Passing yards	
	Passes	
	Sacked–yards	
	Net passing yards	
	Total yards	
	Return yards	
	Punts	
	Fumbles–lost	
	Penalties–yards	
	Time of possession	

=== Week P3 (Saturday, August 22, 1981) vs. Seattle Seahawks ===
Preseason Week 3: Seattle Seahawks at San Francisco 49ers – Game summary

Quarter	1	2	3	4	Total
Seahawks (0–3)	17	0	0	0	17
49ers (2–1)	7	0	7	10	24

at Candlestick Park • San Francisco, California

- Date: August 22, 1981
- Game time: 6:00 p.m. PDT
- Game attendance: 37,563
- TV announcers (KPIX-TV): Bob Waller (play-by-play) and Wayne Walker (color commentator)

Team	Category	Player	Statistics
SEA	Passing		
SEA	Rushing		
SEA	Receiving		
SF	Passing		
SF	Rushing		
SF	Receiving		

Scoring summary

Quarter	Time	Drive			Team	Scoring information	Score	
Quarter	Time	Plays	Yards	TOP	Team	Scoring information	SEA	SF
"TOP" = time of possession. For other American football terms, see Glossary of American football.							17	24

- Point spread:
- Over/under:
- Time of game:

Seahawks	Game Statistics	49ers
	First downs	
	Rushes–yards	
	Passing yards	
	Passes	
	Sacked–yards	
	Net passing yards	
	Total yards	
	Return yards	
	Punts	
	Fumbles–lost	
	Penalties–yards	
	Time of possession	

=== Week P4 (Saturday, August 29, 1981): at Oakland Raiders ===
Preseason Week 4: San Francisco 49ers at Oakland Raiders – Game summary

Quarter	1	2	3	4	Total
49ers (2–2)	0	0	0	7	7
Raiders (2–2)	14	7	0	0	21

at Oakland–Alameda County Coliseum • Oakland, California

- Date: August 29, 1981
- Game time: 6:00 p.m. PDT
- Game attendance: 51,192
- TV announcers (KPIX-TV): Bob Waller (play-by-play) and Wayne Walker (color commentator)

Team	Category	Player	Statistics
SF	Passing		
SF	Rushing		
SF	Receiving		
OAK	Passing		
OAK	Rushing		
OAK	Receiving		

Scoring summary

Quarter	Time	Drive			Team	Scoring information	Score	
Quarter	Time	Plays	Yards	TOP	Team	Scoring information	SF	OAK
"TOP" = time of possession. For other American football terms, see Glossary of American football.							7	21

- Point spread:
- Over/under:
- Time of game:

49ers	Game Statistics	Raiders
	First downs	
	Rushes–yards	
	Passing yards	
	Passes	
	Sacked–yards	
	Net passing yards	
	Total yards	
	Return yards	
	Punts	
	Fumbles–lost	
	Penalties–yards	
	Time of possession	

== Regular season ==
With the offense in good shape, Walsh and the 49ers focused on overhauling the defense in 1981. Walsh took the highly unusual step of overhauling his entire secondary with rookies and untested players, bringing on board Ronnie Lott, Eric Wright and Carlton Williamson and giving Dwight Hicks a prominent role. He also acquired veteran linebacker Jack "Hacksaw" Reynolds and veteran defensive lineman and sack specialist Fred Dean.

These new additions, when added to existing defensive mainstays like Keena Turner, turned the 49ers into a dominant team. After a 1–2 start, the 49ers won all but one of their final games to finish with a 13–3 record, easily the best record in the team's history. Additionally, the 49ers defense yielded more than 20 points in only three games. Dean and Hicks made the Pro Bowl. The 49ers selection of Lott in the 1981 NFL draft proved to be a seminal one. In addition to making the NFC Pro Bowl roster, Lott was voted First-Team All-Pro and received nods from all 5 newspapers that voted, a significant honor for a rookie. Giants' linebacker Lawrence Taylor was the only other rookie from the 1981 NFL draft to achieve this unanimous selection to the First Team All-Pro unit.

Led by Montana, the unusual offense was centered around the short passing game, which Walsh used as ball control. Both Dwight Clark and Freddie Solomon had excellent years receiving; Clark as the possession receiver, and Solomon as more of a deep threat. The 49ers running game, however, was among the weakest for any champion in NFL history. Ricky Patton led the 49ers with only 543 yards rushing. The 49ers' most valuable running back, however, might have been Earl Cooper, whose strength was as a pass-catching back (he had 51 catches during the season).

=== Schedule ===
Week	Date	Opponent	Result	Record	Venue	Attendance	Recap
1	September 6	at Detroit Lions	**L** 17–24	0–1	Pontiac Silverdome	63,710	Recap
2	September 13	Chicago Bears	**W** 28–17	1–1	Candlestick Park	49,520	Recap
3	September 20	at **Atlanta Falcons**	**L** 17–34	1–2	Atlanta–Fulton County Stadium	56,653	Recap
4	September 27	**New Orleans Saints**	**W** 21–14	2–2	Candlestick Park	44,433	Recap
5	October 4	at Washington Redskins	**W** 30–17	3–2	Robert F. Kennedy Memorial Stadium	51,843	Recap
6	October 11	Dallas Cowboys	**W** 45–14	4–2	Candlestick Park	57,574	Recap
7	October 18	at Green Bay Packers	**W** 13–3	5–2	Milwaukee County Stadium	50,171	Recap
8	October 25	**Los Angeles Rams**	**W** 20–17	6–2	Candlestick Park	59,190	Recap
9	November 1	at Pittsburgh Steelers	**W** 17–14	7–2	Three Rivers Stadium	52,878	Recap
10	November 8	**Atlanta Falcons**	**W** 17–14	8–2	Candlestick Park	59,127	Recap
11	November 15	Cleveland Browns	**L** 12–15	8–3	Candlestick Park	52,455	Recap
12	November 22	at **Los Angeles Rams**	**W** 33–31	9–3	Anaheim Stadium	63,456	Recap
13	November 29	New York Giants	**W** 17–10	10–3	Candlestick Park	57,186	Recap
14	December 6	at Cincinnati Bengals	**W** 21–3	11–3	Riverfront Stadium	56,796	Recap
15	December 13	Houston Oilers	**W** 28–6	12–3	Candlestick Park	55,707	Recap
16	December 20	at **New Orleans Saints**	**W** 21–17	13–3	Louisiana Superdome	43,639	Recap
Note: Intra-division opponents are in **bold** text.

== Regular season game summaries ==
=== Week 1 (Sunday, September 6, 1981): at Detroit Lions ===
Week 1: San Francisco 49ers at Detroit Lions – Game summary

Quarter	1	2	3	4	Total
49ers (0–1)	0	3	0	14	17
Lions (1–0)	0	10	0	14	24

at Pontiac Silverdome • Pontiac, Michigan

- Date: September 6, 1981
- Game time: 10:00 a.m. PDT
- Game weather: indoors
- Game attendance: 63,710
- Referee: Tom Dooley
- TV announcers (CBS): Lindsey Nelson (play-by-play) and George Allen (color commentator)

Team	Category	Player	Statistics
SF	Passing	Joe Montana	18/28, 195 YDS, 1 TD, 1 INT
SF	Rushing	Ricky Patton	15 CAR, 72 YDS, 1 TD
SF	Receiving	Freddie Solomon	8 REC, 94 YDS, 1 TD
DET	Passing	Gary Danielson	16/27, 197 YDS, 2 TDs, 1 INT
DET	Rushing	Billy Sims	21 CAR, 59 YDS, 1 TD
DET	Receiving	Billy Sims	5 REC, 66 YDS, 1 TD

Scoring summary

Quarter	Time	Drive			Team	Scoring information	Score	
Quarter	Time	Plays	Yards	TOP	Team	Scoring information	SF	DET
2	4:28				49ers	25-yard field goal by Wersching	3	0
2	0:28				Lions	Sims 39-yard touchdown reception from Danielson, Murray kick good	3	7
2	0:00				Lions	29-yard field goal by Murray	3	10
4	14:54				49ers	Patton 1-yard touchdown run, Wersching kick good	10	10
4	10:31				Lions	King 17-yard touchdown reception from Danielson, Murray kick good	10	17
4	7:30				49ers	Solomon 21-yard touchdown reception from Montana, Wersching kick good	17	17
4	0:18				Lions	Sims 1-yard touchdown run, Murray kick good	17	24
"TOP" = time of possession. For other American football terms, see Glossary of American football.							17	24

- Point spread: 49ers +4
- Over/under: 40.0 (over)
- Time of game:

49ers	Game Statistics	Lions
19	First downs	21
33–121	Rushes–yards	30–127
195	Passing yards	196
18–28–1	Passes	16–27–1
4–19	Sacked–yards	4–28
176	Net passing yards	168
297	Total yards	295
105	Return yards	47
3–33.7	Punts	4–46.2
2–2	Fumbles–lost	1–1
8–54	Penalties–yards	7–65
31:56	Time of possession	28:04

Individual stats

- Passing: Montana – 18/28, 195 YDS, 1 TD, 1 INT
- Rushing: Patton – 15 CAR, 72 YDS, 1 TD; Easley – 7 CAR, 23 YDS; Cooper – 9 CAR, 22 YDS; Montana – 2 CAR, 4 YDS
- Receiving: Solomon – 8 REC, 94 YDS, 1 TD; Clark – 5 REC, 57 YDS; Cooper – 3 REC, 11 YDS; Young – 2 REC, 33 YDS
- Kickoff returns: Jones – 3 KR, 43 YDS; Patton – 1 KR, 0 YDS
- Punt returns: Hicks – 2 PR, 46 YDS; Solomon – 2 PR, 16 YDS
- Punting: Miller – 3 PUNTS, 101 YDS
- Kicking: Wersching – 2/2 PAT, 1/2 FG
- Sacks: Pillers – 2.0; Harper – 1.0; McColl – 1.0
- Interceptions: Reynolds – 1 INT, 0 YDS
- 49ers Missed Field Goals: Wersching 32

=== Week 2 (Sunday, September 13, 1981): vs. Chicago Bears ===
Week 2: Chicago Bears at San Francisco 49ers – Game summary

Quarter	1	2	3	4	Total
Bears (0–2)	0	10	7	0	17
49ers (1–1)	7	7	7	7	28

at Candlestick Park • San Francisco, California

- Date: September 13, 1981
- Game time: 1:00 p.m. PDT
- Game weather: 62 °F (17 °C); wind 12
- Game attendance: 49,520
- Referee: Bob Frederic
- TV announcers (CBS): Tom Brookshier (play-by-play) and Johnny Morris (color commentator)

Team	Category	Player	Statistics
CHI	Passing	Vince Evans	19/33, 216 YDS, 1 TD, 1 INT
CHI	Rushing	Walter Payton	27 CAR, 97 YDS, 1 TD
CHI	Receiving	Rickey Watts	5 REC, 74 YDS
SF	Passing	Joe Montana	20/32, 287 YDS, 3 TDs
SF	Rushing	Ricky Patton	14 CAR, 67 YDS, 1 TD
SF	Receiving	Dwight Clark	6 REC, 81 YDS

Scoring summary

Quarter	Time	Drive			Team	Scoring information	Score	
Quarter	Time	Plays	Yards	TOP	Team	Scoring information	CHI	SF
1	5:23				49ers	Patton 31-yard touchdown reception from Montana, Bahr kick good	0	7
2	11:52				49ers	Solomon 46-yard touchdown reception from Montana, Bahr kick good	0	14
2	6:27				Bears	Payton 2-yard touchdown run, Thomas kick good	7	14
2	0:32				Bears	37-yard field goal by Thomas	10	14
3	11:36				Bears	Earl 12-yard touchdown reception from Evans, Thomas kick good	17	14
3	5:41				49ers	Young 5-yard touchdown reception from Montana, Bahr kick good	17	21
4	1:25				49ers	Patton 12-yard touchdown run, Bahr kick good	17	28
"TOP" = time of possession. For other American football terms, see Glossary of American football.							17	28

- Point spread: 49ers Pick
- Over/under: 41.0 (over)
- Time of game:

Bears	Game Statistics	49ers
18	First downs	20
36–123	Rushes–yards	32–125
216	Passing yards	287
19–33–1	Passes	20–32–0
1–0	Sacked–yards	0–0
216	Net passing yards	287
339	Total yards	412
106	Return yards	110
6–41.5	Punts	5–38.0
2–2	Fumbles–lost	2–2
4–16	Penalties–yards	3–25
25:16	Time of possession	34:44

Individual stats

- Passing: Montana – 20/32, 287 YDS, 3 TDs
- Rushing: Patton – 14 CAR, 67 YDS, 1 TD; Cooper – 14 CAR, 67 YDS; Easley – 3 CAR, 5 YDS; Solomon – 1 CAR, –3 YDS
- Receiving: Clark – 6 REC, 81 YDS; Solomon – 5 REC, 113 YDS, 1 TD; Cooper – 4 REC, 28 YDS; Patton – 2 REC, 34 YDS, 1 TD; Young – 2 REC, 19 YDS, 1 TD; Elliott – 1 REC, 12 YDS
- Kickoff returns: Lott – 3 KR, 55 YDS; Davis – 1 KR, 0 YDS
- Punt returns: Solomon – 4 PR, 40 YDS; Hicks – 1 PR, 7 YDS
- Punting: Miller – 5 PUNTS, 190 YDS
- Kicking: Bahr – 4/4 PAT, 0/2 FG
- Sacks: Board – 0.5; Harty – 0.5
- Interceptions: Hicks – 1 INT, 8 YDS
- 49ers Missed Field Goals: Bahr 39, 48

=== Week 3 (Sunday, September 20, 1981): at Atlanta Falcons ===
Week 3: San Francisco 49ers at Atlanta Falcons – Game summary

Quarter	1	2	3	4	Total
49ers (1–2)	0	10	0	7	17
Falcons (3–0)	17	7	10	0	34

at Atlanta–Fulton County Stadium • Atlanta, Georgia

- Date: September 20, 1981
- Game time: 10:00 a.m. PDT
- Game weather: 61 °F (16 °C); wind 8
- Game attendance: 56,653
- Referee: Gene Barth
- TV announcers (CBS): Lindsey Nelson (play-by-play) and George Allen (color commentator)

Team	Category	Player	Statistics
SF	Passing	Joe Montana	24/34, 274 YDS, 2 TDs, 2 INTs
SF	Rushing	Earl Cooper	9 CAR, 40 YDS
SF	Receiving	Dwight Clark	9 REC, 77 YDS
ATL	Passing	Steve Bartkowski	13/22, 208 YDS, 3 TDs
ATL	Rushing	William Andrews	12 CAR, 85 YDS
ATL	Receiving	William Andrews	4 REC, 37 YDS

Scoring summary

Quarter	Time	Drive			Team	Scoring information	Score	
Quarter	Time	Plays	Yards	TOP	Team	Scoring information	SF	ATL
1	11:21				Falcons	Jackson 29-yard touchdown reception from Bartkowski, Luckhurst kick good	0	7
1	5:14				Falcons	47-yard field goal by Luckhurst	0	10
1	3:57				Falcons	Cain 17-yard touchdown reception from Bartkowski, Luckhurst kick good	0	17
2	13:32	9	80		49ers	Young 11-yard touchdown reception from Montana, Bahr kick good	7	17
2	8:05	6	10		49ers	47-yard field goal by Bahr	10	17
2	4:57				Falcons	Jenkins 15-yard touchdown reception from Bartkowski, Luckhurst kick good	10	24
3	9:39	—	—	—	Falcons	Interception returned 101 yards for touchdown by Pridemore, Luckhurst kick good	10	31
3	4:04				Falcons	18-yard field goal by Luckhurst	10	34
4	6:10	7	77		49ers	Solomon 12-yard touchdown reception from Montana, Bahr kick good	17	34
"TOP" = time of possession. For other American football terms, see Glossary of American football.							17	34

- Point spread: 49ers +9
- Over/under: 41.0 (over)
- Time of game:

49ers	Game Statistics	Falcons
23	First downs	18
30–113	Rushes–yards	34–163
274	Passing yards	222
24–34–2	Passes	14–23–0
1–1	Sacked–yards	2–22
273	Net passing yards	200
386	Total yards	363
110	Return yards	199
3–35.3	Punts	3–36.7
1–1	Fumbles–lost	2–0
3–25	Penalties–yards	4v50
32:08	Time of possession	27:52

Individual stats

- Passing: Montana – 24/34, 274 YDS, 2 TDs, 2 INTs
- Rushing: Cooper – 9 CAR, 40 YDS; Patton – 12 CAR, 30 YDS; Easley – 4 CAR, 18 YDS; Elliott – 4 CAR, 17 YDS; Solomon – 1 CAR, 0 YDS
- Receiving: Clark – 9 REC, 77 YDS; Young – 3 REC, 55 YDS, 1 TD; Solomon – 3 REC, 36 YDS, 1 TD; Cooper – 3 REC, 29 YDS; Wilson – 2 REC, 34 YDS; Patton – 2 REC, 16 YDS; Hofer – 1 REC, 22 YDS; Peets – 1 REC, 5 YDS
- Kickoff returns: Lott – 3 KR, 56 YDS; Ring – 1 KR, 23 YDS; Wilson – 1 KR, 22 YDS
- Punt returns: Solomon – 2 PR, 9 YDS
- Punting: Miller – 3 PUNTS, 160 YDS
- Kicking: Bahr – 2/2 PAT, 1/2 FG
- Sacks: Board – 2.0
- 49ers Missed Field Goals: Bahr 24 (Blocked)

Joe Montana was intercepted twice in 34 passes (24 completed) as the Niners fell to the Falcons for the eleventh time in the last eight seasons.

=== Week 4 (Sunday, September 27, 1981): vs. New Orleans Saints ===
Week 4: New Orleans Saints at San Francisco 49ers – Game summary

Quarter	1	2	3	4	Total
Saints (1–3)	7	0	0	7	14
49ers (2–2)	0	7	7	7	21

at Candlestick Park • San Francisco, California

- Date: September 27, 1981
- Game time: 1:00 p.m. PDT
- Game weather: 64 °F (18 °C); wind 12
- Game attendance: 44,433
- Referee: Fred Silva
- TV announcers (CBS): Lindsey Nelson (play-by-play) and George Allen (color commentator)

Team	Category	Player	Statistics
NO	Passing	Dave Wilson	11/22, 180 YDS, 1 TD, 1 INT
NO	Rushing	George Rogers	25 CAR, 115 YDS
NO	Receiving	Wes Chandler	4 REC, 72 YDS
SF	Passing	Joe Montana	16/22, 175 YDS, 1 TD, 1 INT
SF	Rushing	Johnny Davis	11 CAR, 48 YDS
SF	Receiving	Charle Young	3 REC, 41 YDS

Scoring summary

Quarter	Time	Drive			Team	Scoring information	Score	
Quarter	Time	Plays	Yards	TOP	Team	Scoring information	NO	SF
1	1:27				Saints	Groth 24-yard touchdown reception from Wilson, Ricardo kick good	7	0
2	9:52				49ers	Davis 6-yard touchdown run, Bahr kick good	7	7
3	11:48				49ers	Solomon 60-yard touchdown reception from Montana, Bahr kick good	7	14
4	11:32	—	—	—	49ers	Interception returned 26 yards for touchdown by Lott, Bahr kick good	7	21
4	1:09				Saints	Wilson 9-yard touchdown reception from Manning, Ricardo kick good	14	21
"TOP" = time of possession. For other American football terms, see Glossary of American football.							14	21

- Point spread: 49ers –6
- Over/under: 43.0 (under)
- Time of game:

Saints	Game Statistics	49ers
18	First downs	15
37–163	Rushes–yards	39–146
250	Passing yards	175
21–38–2	Passes	16–22–1
0–0	Sacked–yards	1–7
250	Net passing yards	168
413	Total yards	314
192	Return yards	102
6–40.2	Punts	9–45.1
3–2	Fumbles–lost	1–1
11–106	Penalties–yards	8–79
30:44	Time of possession	29:16

Individual stats

- Passing: Montana – 16/22, 175 YDS, 1 TD, 1 INT
- Rushing: Davis – 11 CAR, 48 YDS, 1 TD; Patton – 14 CAR, 42 YDS; Hofer – 4 CAR, 19 YDS; Montana – 3 CAR, 17 YDS; Cooper – 5 CAR, 10 YDS; Easley – 1 CAR, 5 YDS; Solomon – 1 CAR, 5 YDS
- Receiving: Young – 3 REC, 41 YDS; Clark – 3 REC, 30 YDS; Cooper – 3 REC, 6 YDS; Solomon – 2 REC, 80 YDS, 1 TD; Patton – 2 REC, 8 YDS; Hofer – 2 REC, 7 YDS; Lawrence – 1 REC, 3 YDS
- Kickoff returns: Lawrence – 1 KR, 26 YDS; Lott – 1 KR, 0 YDS
- Punt returns: Solomon – 3 PR, 14 YDS; Hicks – 1 PR, 10 YDS
- Punting: Miller – 9 PUNTS, 406 YDS
- Kicking: Bahr – 3/3 PAT
- Interceptions: Lott – 1 INT, 26 YDS, 1 TD; Wright – 1 INT, 26 YDS

=== Week 5 (Sunday, October 4, 1981): at Washington Redskins ===
Week 5: San Francisco 49ers at Washington Redskins – Game summary

Quarter	1	2	3	4	Total
49ers (3–2)	14	10	6	0	30
Redskins (0–5)	0	3	0	14	17

at RFK Stadium • Washington, D.C.

- Date: October 4, 1981
- Game time: 10:00 a.m. PDT
- Game weather: 58 °F (14 °C); wind 10
- Game attendance: 51,843
- Referee: Gordon McCarter
- TV announcers (CBS): Tom Brookshier (play-by-play) and Roger Staubach (color commentator)

Team	Category	Player	Statistics
SF	Passing	Joe Montana	15/28, 193 YDS, 1 INT
SF	Rushing	Ricky Patton	9 CAR, 43 YDS, 1 TD
SF	Receiving	Lenvil Elliott	6 REC, 69 YDS
WSH	Passing	Joe Theismann	10/22, 123 YDS, 2 INTs
WSH	Rushing	John Riggins	13 CAR, 47 YDS
WSH	Receiving	Joe Washington	8 REC, 49 YDS

Scoring summary

Quarter	Time	Drive			Team	Scoring information	Score	
Quarter	Time	Plays	Yards	TOP	Team	Scoring information	SF	WSH
1	9:22				49ers	Patton 16-yard touchdown run, Bahr kick good	7	0
1	4:16	—	—	—	49ers	Fumble recovery returned 80 yards for touchdown by Hicks, Bahr kick good	14	0
2	12:21				49ers	43-yard field goal by Bahr	17	0
2	8:46				Redskins	34-yard field goal by Moseley	17	3
2	6:17				49ers	Davis 1-yard touchdown run, Bahr kick good	24	3
2	5:51	—	—	—	49ers	Interception returned 32 yards for touchdown by Hicks, Bahr kick no good	30	3
4	10:33	–	–	–	Redskins	Nelms 58-yard punt return for a touchdown, Moseley kick good	30	10
4	4:48				Redskins	Washington 5-yard touchdown run, Moseley kick good	30	17
"TOP" = time of possession. For other American football terms, see Glossary of American football.							30	17

- Point spread: 49ers +2
- Over/under: 43.0 (over)
- Time of game:

49ers	Game Statistics	Redskins
16	First downs	19
35–128	Rushes–yards	23–83
193	Passing yards	241
15–28–1	Passes	22–46–4
2–25	Sacked–yards	2–20
168	Net passing yards	221
296	Total yards	304
176	Return yards	224
5–40.0	Punts	5–40.4
1–1	Fumbles–lost	4–2
3–27	Penalties–yards	7–50
29:17	Time of possession	30:43

Individual stats

- Passing: Montana – 15/28, 193 YDS, 1 INT
- Rushing: Patton – 9 CAR, 43 YDS, 1 TD; Davis – 13 CAR, 37 YDS, 1 TD; Cooper – 6 CAR, 21 YDS; Lawrence – 2 CAR, 14 YDS; Elliott – 3 CAR, 12 YDS; Easley – 2 CAR, 1 YD
- Receiving: Elliott – 6 REC, 69 YDS; Solomon – 5 REC, 77 YDS; Young – 2 REC, 24 YDS; Clark – 1 REC, 21 YDS; Cooper – 1 CAR, 2 YDS
- Kickoff returns: Lawrence – 2 KR, 41 YDS
- Punt returns: Solomon – 2 PR, 9 YDS
- Punting: Miller – 5 PUNTS, 200 YDS
- Kicking: Bahr – 3/3 PAT, 1/2 FG
- Sacks: Board – 2.0
- Interceptions: Hicks – 2 INTs, 104 YDS, 1 TD; McColl – 1 INT, 22 YDS; Lott – 1 INT, 0 YDS
- 49ers Missed Field Goals: Bahr 25

=== Week 6 (Sunday, October 11, 1981): vs. Dallas Cowboys ===
Week 6: Dallas Cowboys at San Francisco 49ers – Game summary

Quarter	1	2	3	4	Total
Cowboys (4–2)	0	7	0	7	14
49ers (4–2)	21	3	14	7	45

at Candlestick Park • San Francisco, California

- Date: October 11, 1981
- Game time: 1:00 p.m. PDT
- Game weather: 58 °F (14 °C); relative humidity 67%; wind 18 miles per hour (29 km/h; 16 kn)
- Game attendance: 57,574
- Referee: Jim Tunney
- TV announcers (CBS): Pat Summerall (play-by-play) and John Madden (analyst)

Team	Category	Player	Statistics
DAL	Passing	Danny White	8/16, 60 YDS, 2 INTs
DAL	Rushing	Tony Dorsett	9 CAR, 21 YDS
DAL	Receiving	Ron Springs	3 REC, 9 YDS
SF	Passing	Joe Montana	19/29, 279 YDS, 2 TDs
SF	Rushing	Paul Hofer	11 CAR, 40 YDS, 1 TD
SF	Receiving	Freddie Solomon	5 REC, 74 YDS, 1 TD

Scoring summary

Quarter	Time	Drive			Team	Scoring information	Score	
Quarter	Time	Plays	Yards	TOP	Team	Scoring information	DAL	SF
1	11:15	11	61		49ers	Solomon 1-yard touchdown reception from Montana, Wersching kick good	0	7
1	7:07	6	68		49ers	Hofer 4-yard touchdown run, Wersching kick good	0	14
1	1:14	4	6		49ers	Davis 1-yard touchdown run, Wersching kick good	0	21
2	13:34	7	32		49ers	18-yard field goal by Wersching	0	24
2	3:59	10	86		Cowboys	Hill 22-yard touchdown reception from Pearson, Septién kick good	7	24
3	9:12	1	78		49ers	Clark 78-yard touchdown reception from Montana, Wersching kick good	7	31
3	8:37	—	—	—	49ers	Interception returned 41 yards for touchdown by Lott, Wersching kick good	7	38
4	12:53	16	84		49ers	Lawrence 1-yard touchdown run, Wersching kick good	7	45
4	8:07	—	—	—	Cowboys	Fumble recovery returned 72 yards for touchdown by Barnes, Septién kick good	14	45
"TOP" = time of possession. For other American football terms, see Glossary of American football.							14	45

- Point spread: 49ers +5
- Over/under: 45.0 (over)
- Time of game:

Cowboys	Game Statistics	49ers
10	First downs	23
21–83	Rushes–yards	46–150
135	Passing yards	304
12–29–2	Passes	20–33–0
3–26	Sacked–yards	1–14
109	Net passing yards	290
192	Total yards	440
138	Return yards	110
8–39.5	Punts	6–46.2
3–2	Fumbles–lost	4–1
5–40	Penalties–yards	4–28
25:53	Time of possession	34:07

Individual stats

- Passing: Montana – 19/29, 279 YDS, 2 TDs; Solomon – 1/1, 25 YDS; Benjamin – 0/3, 0 YDS
- Rushing: Hofer – 11 CAR, 40 YDS, 1 TD; Davis – 8 CAR, 28 YDS, 1 TD; Easley – 8 CAR, 28 YDS; Lawrence – 6 CAR, 27 YDS, 1 TD; Patton – 7 CAR, 16 YDS; Cooper – 5 CAR, 9 YDS; Montana – 1 CAR, 2 YDS
- Receiving: Solomon – 5 REC, 74 YDS, 1 TD; Clark – 4 REC, 135 YDS, 1 TD; Young – 3 REC, 35 YDS; Hofer – 3 REC, 22 YDS; Wilson – 2 REC, 22 YDS; Cooper – 2 REC, 12 YDS; Patton – 1 REC, 4 YDS
- Kickoff returns: Lawrence – 2 KR, 49 YDS
- Punt returns: Solomon – 2 PR, 5 YDS; Hicks – 1 PR, 3 YDS
- Punting: Miller – 6 PUNTS, 277 YDS
- Kicking: Wersching – 6/6 PAT, 1/2 FG
- Sacks: Dean – 2.0; Pillers – 1.0
- Interceptions: Lott – 2 INT, 53 YDS, 1 TD
- 49ers Missed Field Goals: Wersching 40

Officials

- Referee: (#3) Jim Tunney
- Umpire: (#8) Pat Harder
- Head linesman: (#25) Sid Semon
- Line judge: (#8) Dick McKenzie
- Back judge: (#11) Pat Knight
- Side judge: (#5) Gil Mace
- Field judge: (#24) Johnny Grier

=== Week 7 (Sunday, October 18, 1981) at Green Bay Packers ===
Week 7: San Francisco 49ers vs. Green Bay Packers – Game summary

Quarter	1	2	3	4	Total
49ers (5–2)	0	3	7	3	13
Packers (2–5)	0	3	0	0	3

at Milwaukee County Stadium • Milwaukee, Wisconsin

- Date: October 18, 1981
- Game time: 11:00 a.m. PDT
- Game weather: 47 °F (8 °C); wind 21
- Game attendance: 50,171
- Referee: Ben Dreith
- TV announcers (CBS): Tim Ryan (play-by-play) and Johnny Morris (color commentator)

Team	Category	Player	Statistics
SF	Passing	Joe Montana	23/32, 220 YDS
SF	Rushing	Johnny Davis	16 CAR, 65 YDS, 1 TD
SF	Receiving	Dwight Clark	6 REC, 55 YDS
GB	Passing	Lynn Dickey	11/18, 156 YDS
GB	Rushing	Gerry Ellis	7 CAR, 50 YDS
GB	Receiving	Gerry Ellis	5 REC, 65 YDS

Scoring summary

Quarter	Time	Drive			Team	Scoring information	Score	
Quarter	Time	Plays	Yards	TOP	Team	Scoring information	SF	GB
2	13:34				Packers	18-yard field goal by Stenerud	0	3
2	0:00				49ers	26-yard field goal by Wersching	3	3
3	4:11				49ers	Davis 1-yard touchdown run, Wersching kick good	10	3
4	4:31				49ers	32-yard field goal by Wersching	13	3
"TOP" = time of possession. For other American football terms, see Glossary of American football.							13	3

- Point spread: 49ers –1
- Over/under: 44.0 (under)
- Time of game:

49ers	Game Statistics	Packers
21	First downs	13
47–126	Rushes–yards	19–78
220	Passing yards	193
23–32–0	Passes	14–24–1
1–9	Sacked–yards	4–30
211	Net passing yards	163
337	Total yards	241
85	Return yards	101
7–35.9	Punts	7–40.0
2–1	Fumbles–lost	1–0
7–35	Penalties–yards	4–35
37:41	Time of possession	22:19

Individual stats

- Passing: Montana – 23/32, 220 YDS
- Rushing: Davis – 16, CAR, 65 YDS, 1 TD; Cooper – 12 CAR, 38 YDS; Patton – 7 CAR, 15 YDS; Easley – 3 CAR, 3 YDS; Hofer – 8 CAR, 3 YDS; Montana – 1 CAR, 2 YDS
- Receiving: Clark – 6 REC, 55 YDS; Hofer – 5 REC, 44 YDS; Solomon – 4 REC, 49 YDS; Patton – 3 REC, 41 YDS; Cooper – 2 REC, 19 YDS; Lawrence – 1 REC, 5 YDS; Young – 1 REC, 4 YDS; Davis – 1 REC, 3 YDS
- Kickoff returns: Lawrence – 2 KR, 21 YDS
- Punt returns: Solomon – 3 PR, 24 YDS; Hicks – 1 PR, 14 YDS
- Punting: Miller – 7 PUNTS, 251 YDS
- Kicking: Wersching – 1/1 PAT, 2/2 FG
- Sacks: Pillers – 3.0; Dean – 1.0
- Interceptions: Hicks – 1 INT, 26 YDS

=== Week 8 (Sunday, October 25, 1981): vs. Los Angeles Rams ===
Week 8: Los Angeles Rams at San Francisco 49ers – Game summary

Quarter	1	2	3	4	Total
Rams (4–4)	0	10	7	0	17
49ers (6–2)	14	3	3	0	20

at Candlestick Park • San Francisco, California

- Date: October 25, 1981
- Game time: 1:00 p.m. PST
- Game weather: 58 °F (14 °C); wind 11
- Game attendance: 59,190
- Referee: Pat Haggerty
- TV announcers (CBS): Gary Bender (play-by-play) and Roger Staubach (color commentator)

Team	Category	Player	Statistics
LA	Passing	Pat Haden	20/39, 310 YDS, 1 TD, 1 INT
LA	Rushing	Wendell Tyler	22 CAR, 90 YDS
LA	Receiving	Preston Dennard	6 REC, 119 YDS
SF	Passing	Joe Montana	18/32, 287 YDS, 2 TDs
SF	Rushing	Paul Hofer	8 CAR, 23 YDS
SF	Receiving	Dwight Clark	8 REC, 109 YDS, 1 TD

Scoring summary

Quarter	Time	Drive			Team	Scoring information	Score	
Quarter	Time	Plays	Yards	TOP	Team	Scoring information	LA	SF
1	5:22				49ers	Solomon 14-yard touchdown reception from Montana, Wersching kick good	0	7
1	0:01				49ers	Clark 41-yard touchdown reception from Montana, Wersching kick good	0	14
2	7:38				Rams	25-yard field goal by Corral	3	14
2	1:03				Rams	Guman 2-yard touchdown run, Corral kick good	10	14
2	0:00				49ers	42-yard field goal by Wersching	10	17
3	2:59				49ers	18-yard field goal by Wersching	10	20
3	0:56				Rams	Tyler 16-yard touchdown reception from Haden, Corral kick good	17	20
"TOP" = time of possession. For other American football terms, see Glossary of American football.							17	20

- Point spread: 49ers –1
- Over/under: 46.0 (under)
- Time of game:

Rams	Game Statistics	49ers
25	First downs	14
37–145	Rushes–yards	28–60
310	Passing yards	287
20–39–1	Passes	18–32–0
6–54	Sacked–yards	3–22
256	Net passing yards	265
401	Total yards	325
267	Return yards	90
5–43.0	Punts	10–43.3
0–0	Fumbles–lost	0–0
7–39	Penalties–yards	5–45
33:18	Time of possession	26:42

Individual stats

- Passing: Montana – 18/32, 287 YDS, 2 TDs
- Rushing: Hofer – 8 CAR, 23 YDS; Davis – 6 CAR, 14 YDS; Patton – 6 CAR, 13 YDS; Cooper – 5 CAR, 7 YDS; Montana – 2 CAR, 3 YDS; Easley – 1 CAR, 0 YDS
- Receiving: Clark – 8 REC, 109 YDS, 1 TD; Solomon – 5 REC, 79 YDS, 1 TD; Cooper – 2 REC, 57 YDS; Young – 1 REC, 29 YDS; Patton – 1 REC, 8 YDS; Wilson – 1 REC, 5 YDS
- Kickoff returns: Lawrence – 2 KR, 61 YDS; Ramson – 1 KR, 12 YDS; Wilson – 1 KR,8 YDS
- Punt returns: Solomon – 2 PR, 9 YDS
- Punting: Miller – 10 PUNTS, 433 YDS
- Kicking: Wersching – 2/2 PAT, 2/2 FG
- Sacks: Dean – 4.5; Pillers – 1.0; Stuckey – 0.5
- Interceptions: Lott – 1 INT, 0 YDS

=== Week 9 (Sunday, November 1, 1981): at Pittsburgh Steelers ===
Week 9: San Francisco 49ers at Pittsburgh Steelers – Game summary

Quarter	1	2	3	4	Total
49ers (7–2)	0	10	0	7	17
Steelers (5–4)	0	0	14	0	14

at Three Rivers Stadium • Pittsburgh, Pennsylvania

- Date: November 1, 1981
- Game time: 10:00 a.m. PST
- Game weather: 50 °F (10 °C); wind 8
- Game attendance: 52,878
- Referee: Bob Frederic
- TV announcers (CBS): Vin Scully (play-by-play) and Hank Stram (color commentator)

Team	Category	Player	Statistics
SF	Passing	Joe Montana	22/37, 205 YDS, 1 TD, 2 INTs
SF	Rushing	Walt Easley	14 CAR, 47 YDS, 1 TD
SF	Receiving	Dwight Clark	7 REC, 80 YDS
PIT	Passing	Terry Bradshaw	12/23, 125 YDS, 1 TD, 3 INTs
PIT	Rushing	Franco Harris	17 CAR, 104 YDS
PIT	Receiving	Frank Pollard	3 REC, 42 YDS

Scoring summary

Quarter	Time	Drive			Team	Scoring information	Score	
Quarter	Time	Plays	Yards	TOP	Team	Scoring information	SF	PIT
2	0:32				49ers	Young 5-yard touchdown reception from Montana, Wersching kick good	7	0
2	0:03				49ers	45-yard field goal by Wersching	10	0
3	10:36	—	—	—	Steelers	Interception returned 50 yards for touchdown by Blount, Trout kick good	10	7
3	6:39				Steelers	Smith 22-yard touchdown reception from Bradshaw, Trout kick good	10	14
4	5:35				49ers	Easley 1-yard touchdown run, Wersching kick good	17	14
"TOP" = time of possession. For other American football terms, see Glossary of American football.							17	14

- Point spread: 49ers +5
- Over/under: 45.0 (under)
- Time of game:

49ers	Game Statistics	Steelers
25	First downs	16
39–130	Rushes–yards	28–144
210	Passing yards	125
23–38–2	Passes	12–23–3
1–10	Sacked–yards	0–0
200	Net passing yards	125
330	Total yards	269
86	Return yards	192
5–45.8	Punts	2–48.5
0–0	Fumbles–lost	3–3
6–55	Penalties–yards	8–45
34:16	Time of possession	25:34

Individual stats

- Passing: Montana – 22/37, 205 YDS, 1 TD, 2 INTs; Easley – 1/1, 5 YDS
- Rushing: Easley – 14 CAR, 47 YDS, 1 TD; Patton – 13 CAR, 35 YDS; Hofer – 5 CAR, 26 YDS; Montana – 4 CAR, 12 YDS; Cooper – 3 CAR, 10 YDS
- Receiving: Clark – 7 REC, 80 YDS; Cooper – 5 REC, 53 YDS; Young – 3 REC, 13 YDS, 1 TD; Easley – 3 REC, 12 YDS; Solomon – 2 REC, 33 YDS; Patton – 2 REC, 17 YDS; Hofer – 1 REC,2 YDS
- Kickoff returns: Wilson – 2 KR, 37 YDS; Ring – 1 KR, 21 YDS
- Punting: Miller – 5 PUNTS, 229 YDS
- Kicking: Wersching – 2/2 PAT, 1/2 FG
- Interceptions: Williamson – 1 INT, 28 YDS; Hicks – 1 INT, 0 YDS; Wright – 1 INT, 0 YDS
- 49ers Missed Field Goals: Wersching 37 (Blocked)

=== Week 10 (Sunday, November 8, 1981): vs. Atlanta Falcons ===
Week 10: Atlanta Falcons at San Francisco 49ers – Game summary

Quarter	1	2	3	4	Total
Falcons (5–5)	0	0	7	7	14
49ers (8–2)	0	10	0	7	17

at Candlestick Park • San Francisco, California

- Date: November 8, 1981
- Game time: 1:00 p.m. PST
- Game weather: 58 °F (14 °C); wind 11
- Game attendance: 59,127
- Referee: Fred Wyant
- TV announcers (CBS): Lindsey Nelson (play-by-play) and George Allen (color commentator)

Team	Category	Player	Statistics
ATL	Passing	Steve Bartkowski	20/42, 236 YDS, 1 TD, 3 INTs
ATL	Rushing	William Andrews	18 CAR, 61 YDS, 1 TD
ATL	Receiving	Alfred Jenkins	7 REC, 134 YDS
SF	Passing	Joe Montana	16/30, 223 YDS, 2 TDs, 1 INT
SF	Rushing	Walt Easley	15 CAR, 31 YDS
SF	Receiving	Dwight Clark	7 REC, 128 YDS

Scoring summary

Quarter	Time	Drive			Team	Scoring information	Score	
Quarter	Time	Plays	Yards	TOP	Team	Scoring information	ATL	SF
2	3:52				49ers	Solomon 14-yard touchdown reception from Montana, Wersching kick good	0	7
2	0:00				49ers	45-yard field goal by Wersching	0	10
2	4:20				Falcons	Andrews 1-yard touchdown run, Luckhurst kick good	7	10
4	7:29				49ers	Young 3-yard touchdown reception from Montana, Wersching kick good	7	17
4	1:43				Falcons	Jackson 25-yard touchdown reception from Bartkowski, Luckhurst kick good	14	17
"TOP" = time of possession. For other American football terms, see Glossary of American football.							14	17

- Point spread: 49ers +2½
- Over/under: 44.0 (under)
- Time of game:

Falcons	Game Statistics	49ers
19	First downs	17
26–76	Rushes–yards	34–82
236	Passing yards	223
20–42–3	Passes	16–30–1
3–20	Sacked–yards	2–18
216	Net passing yards	205
292	Total yards	287
126	Return yards	162
8–44.9	Punts	10–42.0
2–0	Fumbles–lost	4–0
8–82	Penalties–yards	11–74
29:29	Time of possession	30:31

Individual stats

- Passing: Montana – 16/30, 223 YDS, 2 TDs, 1 INT
- Rushing: Easley – 15 CAR, 31 YDS; Patton – 9 CAR, 26 YDS; Solomon – 3 CAR, 11 YDS; Clark – 1 CAR, 9 YDS; Cooper – 3 CAR, 4 YDS; Montana – 2 CAR, 1 YD; Hofer – 1 CAR, 0 YDS
- Receiving: Clark – 7 REC, 128 YDS; Solomon – 3 REC, 56 YDS, 1 TD; Easley – 2 REC, 9 YDS; Young – 2 REC, 9 YDS, 1 TD; Hofer – 1 REC, 21 YDS; Cooper – 1 REC, 0 YDS
- Kickoff returns: Ring – 1 KR, 29 YDS; Hicks – 1 KR, 22 YDS
- Punt returns: Hicks – 4 PR, 36 YDS; Solomon – 3 PR, 15 YDS
- Punting: Miller – 10 PUNTS, 420 YDS
- Kicking: Wersching – 2/2 PAT, 1/1 FG
- Sacks: Board – 1.0; Dean – 1.0; Turner – 1.0
- Interceptions: Hicks – 2 INT, 37 YDS; Martin – 1 INT, 0 YDS

=== Week 11 (Sunday, November 15, 1981): vs. Cleveland Browns ===
Week 11: Cleveland Browns at San Francisco 49ers – Game summary

Quarter	1	2	3	4	Total
Browns (5–6)	2	3	0	10	15
49ers (8–3)	0	6	6	0	12

at Candlestick Park • San Francisco, California

- Date: November 15, 1981
- Game time: 1:00 p.m. PST
- Game weather: 60 °F (16 °C); wind 15
- Game attendance: 52,455
- Referee: Chuck Heberling
- TV announcers (NBC): Don Criqui (play-by-play) and John Brodie (color commentator)

Team	Category	Player	Statistics
CLE	Passing	Brian Sipe	16/33, 180 YDS, 1 TD, 1 INT
CLE	Rushing	Mike Pruitt	18 CAR, 76 YDS
CLE	Receiving	Greg Pruitt	4 REC, 33 YDS
SF	Passing	Joe Montana	24/42, 213 YDS, 2 INTs
SF	Rushing	Walt Easley	16 CAR, 59 YDS
SF	Receiving	Paul Hofer	7 REC, 64 YDS

Scoring summary

Quarter	Time	Drive			Team	Scoring information	Score	
Quarter	Time	Plays	Yards	TOP	Team	Scoring information	CLE	SF
1	8:35	–	–	–	Browns	Intentional grounding by Montana in end zone for a safety	2	0
2	11:28				49ers	28-yard field goal by Wersching	2	3
2	7:12				Browns	28-yard field goal by Bahr	5	3
2	1:07				49ers	29-yard field goal by Wersching	5	6
3	8:24				49ers	28-yard field goal by Wersching	5	9
3	1:00				49ers	28-yard field goal by Wersching	5	12
4	6:46				Browns	Rucker 21-yard touchdown reception from Sipe, Bahr kick good	12	12
4	0:43				Browns	24-yard field goal by Bahr	15	12
"TOP" = time of possession. For other American football terms, see Glossary of American football.							15	12

- Point spread: 49ers –3
- Over/under: 43.0 (under)
- Time of game:

Browns	Game Statistics	49ers
14	First downs	21
26–106	Rushes–yards	35–118
180	Passing yards	213
16–33–1	Passes	24–42–2
2–19	Sacked–yards	3–26
161	Net passing yards	187
267	Total yards	305
165	Return yards	84
5–42.4	Punts	4–36.0
1–1	Fumbles–lost	1–0
7–55	Penalties–yards	4–29
24:48	Time of possession	35:12

Individual stats

- Passing: Montana – 24/42, 213 YDS, 2 INTs
- Rushing: Easley – 16 CAR, 59 YDS; Hofer – 10 CAR, 33 YDS; Patton – 4 CAR, 15 YDS; Davis – 2 CAR, 6 YDS; Montana – 2 CAR, 5 YDS; Solomon – 1 CAR, 0 YDS
- Receiving: Hofer – 7 REC, 64 YDS; Clark – 6 REC, 52 YDS; Solomon – 3 REC, 35 YDS; Cooper – 3 REC, 21 YDS; Young – 2 REC, 16 YDS; Patton – 1 REC, 11 YDS; Shumann – 1 REC, 8 YDS; Easley – 1 REC, 6 YDS
- Kickoff returns: Lawrence – 2 KR, 52 YDS
- Punt returns: Solomon – 2 PR, 22 YDS
- Punting: Jim Miller – 4 PUNTS, 144 YDS
- Kicking: Wersching – 4/5 FG
- Sacks: Board – 1.5; Reese – 0.5
- Interceptions: Hicks – 1 INT, 10 YDS
- 49ers Missed Field Goals: Wersching 40

The Niners’ winning streak ended in a battle of six combined field goals. Opposing quarterbacks Brian Sipe and Montana combined for 393 yards, three interceptions, and an average passer rating of 56.

=== Week 12 (Sunday, November 22, 1981): at Los Angeles Rams ===
Week 12: San Francisco 49ers at Los Angeles Rams – Game summary

Quarter	1	2	3	4	Total
49ers (9–3)	3	7	17	6	33
Rams (5–7)	0	17	7	7	31

at Anaheim Stadium • Anaheim, California

- Date: November 22, 1981
- Game time: 1:00 p.m. PST
- Game weather: 60 °F (16 °C); wind 8
- Game attendance: 63,456
- Referee: Red Cashion
- TV announcers (CBS): Vin Scully (play-by-play) and Hank Stram (color commentator)

Team	Category	Player	Statistics
SF	Passing	Joe Montana	19/30, 283 YDS, 1 INT
SF	Rushing	Johnny Davis	8 CAR, 23 YDS, 1 TD
SF	Receiving	Freddie Solomon	5 REC, 124 YDS
LA	Passing	Pat Haden	9/13, 122 YDS, 1 TD
LA	Rushing	Wendell Tyler	23 CAR, 97 YDS, 1 TD
LA	Receiving	Preston Dennard	5 REC, 56 YDS, 1 TD

Scoring summary

Quarter	Time	Drive			Team	Scoring information	Score	
Quarter	Time	Plays	Yards	TOP	Team	Scoring information	SF	LA
1	7:33				49ers	47-yard field goal by Wersching	3	0
2	13:57				Rams	44-yard field goal by Corral	3	3
2	6:00				Rams	Tyler 16-yard touchdown reception from Pastorini, Corral kick good	3	10
2	3:37				49ers	Davis 1-yard touchdown run, Wersching kick good	10	10
2	0:23				Rams	Dennard 7-yard touchdown reception from Guman, Corral kick good	10	17
3	14:42	—	—	—	49ers	Lawrence 92-yard kickoff return for a touchdown, Wersching kick good	17	17
3	8:24				49ers	34-yard field goal by Wersching	20	17
3	5:33	—	—	—	49ers	Interception returned 25 yards for touchdown by Lott, Wersching kick good	27	17
3	2:04				Rams	Arnold 2-yard touchdown reception from Haden, Corral kick good	27	24
4	10:10				49ers	32-yard field goal by Wersching	30	24
4	1:51				Rams	Tyler 22-yard touchdown run, Corral kick good	30	31
4	0:00				49ers	37-yard field goal by Wersching	33	31
"TOP" = time of possession. For other American football terms, see Glossary of American football.							33	31

- Point spread: 49ers +3
- Over/under: 42.0 (over)
- Time of game:

49ers	Game Statistics	Rams
19	First downs	27
28–71	Rushes–yards	47–203
283	Passing yards	208
19–30–1	Passes	18–32–1
3–24	Sacked–yards	1–0
259	Net passing yards	208
330	Total yards	411
220	Return yards	91
2–44.0	Punts	4–44.8
1–1	Fumbles–lost	4–1
5–51	Penalties–yards	7–71
25:00	Time of possession	35:00

Individual stats

- Passing: Montana – 19/30, 283 YDS, 1 INT
- Rushing: Davis – 8 CAR, 23 YDS, 1 TD; Patton – 8 CAR, 20 YDS; Hofer – 5 CAR, 16 YDS; Lawrence – 2 CAR, 9 YDS; Cooper – 4 CAR, 4 YDS; Montana – 1 CAR, –1 YDS
- Receiving: Solomon – 5 REC, 124 YDS; Cooper – 5 REC, 55 YDS; Clark – 4 REC, 59 YDS; Hofer – 2 REC, 20 YDS; Young – 2 REC, 18 YDS; Shumann – 1 REC, 7 YDS
- Kickoff returns: Lawrence – 3 KR, 138 YDS, 1 TD; Ring – 2 KR, 45 YDS
- Punt returns: Hicks – 2 PR, 12 YDS
- Punting: Miller – 2 PUNTS, 88 YDS
- Kicking: Wersching – 3/3 PAT, 4/4 FG
- Sacks: Stuckey – 1.0
- Interceptions: Lott – 1 INT, 25 YDS, 1 TD

The game lead tied or changed eight times as the Rams wound up using quarterbacks Dan Pastorini and Pat Haden while running back Mike Guman threw a seven-yard touchdown to Preston Dennard. Amos Lawrence opened the third quarter by scoring on the opening kickoff and Ronnie Lott scored after intercepting Pastorini.

=== Week 13 (Sunday, November 29, 1981): vs. New York Giants ===
Week 13: New York Giants at San Francisco 49ers – Game summary

Quarter	1	2	3	4	Total
Giants (6–7)	0	3	0	7	10
49ers (10–3)	7	7	0	3	17

at Candlestick Park • San Francisco, California

- Date: November 29, 1981
- Game time: 1:00 p.m. PST
- Game weather: 49 °F (9 °C); relative humidity 77%; wind 10 miles per hour (16 km/h; 8.7 kn)
- Game attendance: 57,186
- Referee: Jerry Markbreit
- TV announcers (CBS): Tim Ryan (play-by-play) and Fred Dryer (analyst)

Team	Category	Player	Statistics
NYG	Passing	Scott Brunner	13/34, 162 YDS, 3 INTs
NYG	Rushing	Rob Carpenter	13 CAR, 40 YDS, 1 TD
NYG	Receiving	Rob Carpenter	5 REC, 55 YDS
SF	Passing	Joe Montana	27/39, 234 YDS
SF	Rushing	Paul Hofer	8 CAR, 33 YDS
SF	Receiving	Dwight Clark	7 REC, 87 YDS

Scoring summary

Quarter	Time	Drive			Team	Scoring information	Score	
Quarter	Time	Plays	Yards	TOP	Team	Scoring information	NYG	SF
1	4:47	7	16		49ers	Davis 1-yard touchdown run, Wersching kick good	0	7
2	12:04	6	40		49ers	Montana 20-yard touchdown run, Wersching kick good	0	14
2	1:24	3	5		Giants	52-yard field goal by Danelo	3	14
4	14:54	11	76		Giants	Carpenter 3-yard touchdown run, Danelo kick good	10	14
4	7:17	15	72		49ers	23-yard field goal by Wersching	10	17
"TOP" = time of possession. For other American football terms, see Glossary of American football.							10	17

- Point spread: 49ers –5
- Over/under: 39.0 (under)
- Time of game:

Giants	Game Statistics	49ers
12	First downs	19
22–80	Rushes–yards	39–123
162	Passing yards	234
13–34–3	Passes	27–40–0
2–19	Sacked–yards	3–20
143	Net passing yards	214
223	Total yards	337
119	Return yards	136
6–42.8	Punts	8–37.5
3–2	Fumbles–lost	1–0
9–65	Penalties–yards	5–48
21:44	Time of possession	38:16

Individual stats

- Passing: Montana – 27/39, 234 YDS; Clark – 0/1, 0 YDS
- Rushing: Hofer – 8 CAR, 33 YDS; Montana – 2 CAR, 24 YDS, 1 TD; Davis – 11 CAR, 21 YDS, 1 TD; Patton – 7 CAR, 20 YDS; Cooper – 3 CAR, 12 YDS; Ring – 4 CAR, 9 YDS; Solomon – 1 CAR, 6 YDS; Clark – 1 CAR, 5 YDS; Lawrence – 2 CAR, –7 YDS
- Receiving: Clark – 7 REC, 87 YDS; Patton – 5 REC, 23 YDS; Cooper – 4 REC, 37 YDS; Hofer – 4 REC, 31 YDS; Young – 3 REC, 33 YDS; Davis – 2 REC, –4 YDS; Solomon – 1 REC, 26 YDS; Lawrence – 1 REC, 2 YDS
- Kickoff returns: Lawrence – 1 KR, 25 YDS; Ring – 1 KR, 23 YDS
- Punt returns: Hicks – 3 PR, 19 YDS; Solomon – 1 PR, 8 YDS
- Punting: Miller – 8 PUNTS, 300 YARDS
- Kicking: Wersching – 2/2 PAT, 1/3 FG
- Sacks: Dean – 1.0; Kugler – 1.0
- Interceptions: Williamson – 2 INT, 7 YDS; Hicks – 1 INT, 54 YDS
- 49ers Missed Field Goals: Wersching 36 (BL), 40

Officials

- Referee: (#9) Jerry Markbreit
- Umpire: (#17) Ed Fiffick
- Head linesman: (#12) Dale Hamer
- Line judge: (#15) Bama Glass
- Back judge: (#7) Tom Kelleher
- Side judge: (#6) Willie Spencer
- Field judge: (#5) Bill Stanley

=== Week 14 (Sunday, December 6, 1981): at Cincinnati Bengals ===
Week 14: San Francisco 49ers at Cincinnati Bengals – Game summary

Quarter	1	2	3	4	Total
49ers (11–3)	7	7	0	7	21
Bengals (10–4)	0	3	0	0	3

at Riverfront Stadium • Cincinnati, Ohio

- Date: December 6, 1981
- Game time: 10:00 a.m. PST
- Game weather: 28 °F (−2 °C); relative humidity 65%, wind 7 miles per hour (11 km/h; 6.1 kn), wind chill 21 °F (−6 °C)
- Game attendance: 56,796
- Referee: Jerry Seeman
- TV announcers (CBS): Tim Ryan (play-by-play) and Fred Dryer (analyst)

Team	Category	Player	Statistics
SF	Passing	Joe Montana	23/36, 187 YDS, 2 TDs, 1 INT
SF	Rushing	Earl Cooper	12 CAR, 62 YDS
SF	Receiving	Dwight Clark; Earl Cooper	6 REC, 78 YDS, 1 TD; 6 REC, 34 YDS
CIN	Passing	Jack Thompson	10/18, 114 YDS, 1 INT
CIN	Rushing	Pete Johnson	12 CAR, 82 YDS
CIN	Receiving	Dan Ross	7 REC, 69 YDS

Scoring summary

Quarter	Time	Drive			Team	Scoring information	Score	
Quarter	Time	Plays	Yards	TOP	Team	Scoring information	SF	CIN
1	7:04	15	66		49ers	Ring 4-yard touchdown reception from Montana, Wersching kick good	7	0
2	2:32	11	61		Bengals	30-yard field goal by Breech	7	3
2	0:02	10	80		49ers	Clark 15-yard touchdown reception from Montana, Wersching kick good	14	3
4	6:28	8	40		49ers	Montana 1-yard touchdown run, Wersching kick good	21	3
"TOP" = time of possession. For other American football terms, see Glossary of American football.							21	3

- Point spread: 49ers +7
- Over/under: 42.0 (under)
- Time of game:

49ers	Game Statistics	Bengals
24	First downs	24
35–146	Rushes–yards	20–155
187	Passing yards	211
23–36–1	Passes	21–38–3
1–8	Sacked–yards	3–21
179	Net passing yards	190
325	Total yards	345
40	Return yards	102
6–36.8	Punts	3–45.7
0–0	Fumbles–lost	4–3
7–55	Penalties–yards	9–70
26:48	Time of possession	33:12

Individual stats

- Passing: Montana – 23/36, 187 YDS, 2 TDs, 1 INT
- Rushing: Cooper – 12 CAR, 62 YDS; Patton – 10 CAR, 36 YDS; Davis – 8 CAR, 21 YDS; Montana – 2 CAR, 14 YDS, 1 TD; Ring – 2 CAR, 8 YDS; Lawrence – 1 CAR, 5 YDS
- Receiving: Clark – 6 REC, 78 YDS, 1 TD; Cooper – 6 REC, 34 YDS; Young – 3 REC, 22 YDS; Patton – 3 REC, 11 YDS; Wilson – 2 REC, 28 YDS; Shumann – 1 REC, 6 YDS; Ramson – 1 REC, 4 YDS; Ring – 1 REC, 4 YDS
- Kickoff returns: Ring – 1 KR, 17 YDS
- Punt returns: Hicks – 1 PR, 10 YDS
- Punting: Miller – 6 PUNTS, 221 YDS
- Kicking: Wersching – 3/3 PAT
- Sacks: Stuckey – 1.0; Turner – 1.0; Dean – 0.5; Leopold – 0.5
- Interceptions: Lott – 1 INT, 13 YDS; Turner – 1 INT, 0 YDS; Wright – 1 INT, 0 YDS

Officials

- Referee: (#17) Jerry Seeman
- Umpire: (#20) Frank Sinkovitz
- Head linesman: (#3) Leo Miles
- Line judge: (#6) John Leimbach
- Back judge: (#23) Paul Baetz
- Side judge: (#7) Bill Quinby
- Field judge: (#9) Bill O'Brien

=== Week 15 (Sunday, December 13, 1981): vs. Houston Oilers ===
Week 15: Houston Oilers at San Francisco 49ers – Game summary

Quarter	1	2	3	4	Total
Oilers (6–9)	0	0	0	6	6
49ers (12–3)	0	0	21	7	28

at Candlestick Park • San Francisco, California

- Date: December 13, 1981
- Game time: 1:00 p.m. PST
- Game weather: 54 °F (12 °C); wind 7
- Game attendance: 55,707
- Referee: Dick Jorgensen
- TV announcers (NBC): Bob Costas (play-by-play) and Bob Trumpy (color commentator)

Team	Category	Player	Statistics
HOU	Passing	Gifford Nielsen	21/30, 140 YDS
HOU	Rushing	Earl Campbell	18 CAR, 45 YDS, 1 TD
HOU	Receiving	Adger Armstrong	9 REC, 62 YDS
SF	Passing	Joe Montana	18/26, 204 YDS, 1 TD
SF	Rushing	Ricky Patton	9 CAR, 57 YDS, 1 TD
SF	Receiving	Earl Cooper	6 REC, 77 YDS

Scoring summary

Quarter	Time	Drive			Team	Scoring information	Score	
Quarter	Time	Plays	Yards	TOP	Team	Scoring information	HOU	SF
3	8:56	10	69		49ers	Patton 3-yard touchdown run, Wersching kick good	0	7
3	3:47	9	65		49ers	Patton 3-yard touchdown run, Wersching kick good	0	14
3	1:34	4	26		49ers	Clark 2-yard touchdown reception from Montana, Wersching kick good	0	21
4	9:15	10	76		49ers	Wilson 27-yard touchdown reception from Benjamin, Wersching kick good	0	28
4	0:47	8	59		Oilers	Campbell 1-yard touchdown run, Fritsch kick no good	6	28
"TOP" = time of possession. For other American football terms, see Glossary of American football.							6	28

- Point spread: 49ers –7
- Over/under: 39.0 (under)
- Time of game:

Oilers	Game Statistics	49ers
11	First downs	22
22–56	Rushes–yards	29–148
140	Passing yards	286
21–30–0	Passes	25–35–0
1–10	Sacked–yards	3–20
130	Net passing yards	288
186	Total yards	414
163	Return yards	34
7–36.4	Punts	6–42.3
2–2	Fumbles–lost	3–0
8–47	Penalties–yards	8–77
27:40	Time of possession	32:20

Individual stats

- Passing: Montana – 18/26, 204 YDS, 1 TD; Banjamin – 7/9, 82 YDS, 1 TD
- Rushing: Patton – 9 CAR, 57 YDS, 1 TD; Cooper – 7 CAR, 38 YDS, 1 TD; Ring – 5 CAR, 18 YDS; Davis – 5 CAR, 15 YDS; Montana – 2 CAR, 2 YDS; Clark – 1 CAR, 18 YDS
- Receiving: Cooper – 6 REC, 77 YDS; Clark – 5 REC, 35 YDS, 1 TD; Young – 4 REC, 36 YDS; Solomon – 3 REC, 56 YDS; Wilson – 2 REC, 36 YDS, 1 TD; Ring – 2 REC, 24 YDS; Ramson – 1 REC, 14 YDS; Hofer – 1 REC, 11 YDS; Patton – 1 REC, –3 YDS
- Kickoff returns: Ring – 1 KR, 18 YDS
- Punt returns: Hicks – 3 PR, 14 YDS; Solomon – 2 PR, 2 YDS
- Punting: Miller – 6 PUNTS, 254 YDS
- Kicking: Wersching – 4/4 PAT
- Sacks: Turner – 1.0

=== Week 16 (Sunday, December 20, 1981): at New Orleans Saints ===
Week 16: San Francisco 49ers at New Orleans Saints – Game summary

Quarter	1	2	3	4	Total
49ers (13–3)	7	7	0	7	21
Saints (4–12)	14	0	3	0	17

at Louisiana Superdome • New Orleans, Louisiana

- Date: December 20, 1981
- Game time: 11:00 a.m. PST
- Game weather: indoors
- Game attendance: 43,639
- Referee: Gene Barth
- TV announcers (CBS): Tim Ryan (play-by-play) and Fred Dryer (color commentator)

Team	Category	Player	Statistics
SF	Passing	Joe Montana	9/11, 106 YDS, 2 TDs
SF	Rushing	Bill Ring	11 CAR, 71 YDS
SF	Receiving	Freddie Solomon	5 REC, 38 YDS, 1 TD
NO	Passing	Archie Manning	14/21, 110 YDS, 1 INT
NO	Rushing	George Rogers	30 CAR, 107 YDS, 2 TDs
NO	Receiving	Toussaint Tyler	5 REC, 21 YDS

Scoring summary

Quarter	Time	Drive			Team	Scoring information	Score	
Quarter	Time	Plays	Yards	TOP	Team	Scoring information	SF	NO
1	8:27				49ers	Young 13-yard touchdown reception from Montana, Wersching kick good	7	0
1	1:59				Saints	Rogers 6-yard touchdown run, Ricardo kick good	7	7
1	0:13				Saints	Rogers 5-yard touchdown run, Ricardo kick good	7	14
2	11:06				49ers	Solomon 2-yard touchdown reception from Montana, Wersching kick good	14	14
3	2:35				Saints	27-yard field goal by Ricardo	14	17
4	7:13				49ers	Davis 1-yard touchdown run, Wersching kick good	21	17
"TOP" = time of possession. For other American football terms, see Glossary of American football.							21	17

- Point spread: 49ers –7
- Over/under: 37.0 (over)
- Time of game:

49ers	Game Statistics	Saints
19	First downs	15
31–154	Rushes–yards	36–133
195	Passing yards	110
17–25–1	Passes	14–23–1
0–0	Sacked–yards	2–21
195	Net passing yards	89
349	Total yards	222
74	Return yards	118
4–46.0	Punts	4–34.8
3–2	Fumbles–lost	1–0
5–45	Penalties–yards	3–30
26:03	Time of possession	33:57

Individual stats

- Passing: Montana – 9/11, 106 YDS, 2 TDs; Benjamin – 8/14, 89 YDS, 1 INT
- Rushing: Ring – 11 CAR, 71 TDS; Patton – 8 CAR, 36 YDS; Davis – 6 CAR, 19 YDS, 1 TD; Solomon – 1 CAR, 16 YDS; Montana – 1 CAR, 10 YDS; Easley – 2 CAR, 4 YDS; Benjamin – 1 CAR, 1 YD; Cooper – 1 CAR, –3 YDS
- Receiving: Solomon – 5 REC, 38 YDS, 1 TD; Patton – 4 REC, 25 YDS; Easley – 3 REC, 35 YDS; Ramson – 2 REC, 27 YDS; Cooper – 1 REC, 36 YDS; Clark – 1 REC, 21 YDS; Young – 1 REC, 13 YDS, 1 TD
- Kickoff returns: Ring – 2 KR, 41 YDS; Lawrence – 2 KR, 24 YDS
- Punt returns: Solomon – 1 PR, 0 YDS
- Punting: Miller – 4 PUNTS, 184 YDS
- Kicking: Wersching – 3/3 PAT
- Sacks: Dean – 2.0
- Interceptions: Williamson – 1 INT, 9 YDS

== Standings ==
NFC West
	W	L	T	PCT	DIV	CONF	PF	PA	STK
^{(1)} San Francisco 49ers	13	3	0	.813	5–1	10-2	357	250	W5
Atlanta Falcons	7	9	0	.438	3–3	6–6	426	355	L3
Los Angeles Rams	6	10	0	.375	2–4	5–7	303	351	L1
New Orleans Saints	4	12	0	.250	2–4	2–10	207	378	L4

== Regular season stats ==
=== Individual stats ===
Passing

Passing
Player	Pos	G	GS	QBrec	Cmp	Att	Cmp%	Yds	TD	TD%	Int	Int%	Lng	Y/A	AY/A	Y/C	Y/G	Rate	Sk	Yds	NY/A	ANY/A	Sk%	4QC	GWD
Montana	QB	16	16	13–3–0	311	488	63.7	3565	19	3.9	12	2.5	78	7.3	7.0	11.5	222.8	88.4	26	193	5.1	6.56	6.25	2	2
Benjamin	QB	4	0		15	26	57.7	171	1	3.8	1	3.8	27	6.6	5.6	11.4	42.8	74.4	3	30	10.3	4.86	4.00	1	1
Solomon	WR	15	15		1	1	100.0	25	0	0.0	0	0.0	25	25.0	25.0	25.0	1.7	118.7	0	0	0.0	25.00	25.00		
Easley	RB	12	1		1	1	100.0	5	0	0.0	0	0.0	5	5.0	5.0	5.0	0.4	87.5	0	0	0.0	5.00	5.00		
Clark	WR	16	16		0	1	0.0	0	0	0.0	0	0.0	0	0.0	0.0		0.4	39.6	0	0	0.0	0.00	0.00		
Team Total		16		13–3–0	328	517	63.4	3766	20	3.9	13	2.5	78	7.3	6.9	11.5	235.4	87.7	29	223	5.3	6.49	6.15	3	3
Opp Total		16			273	514	53.1	3135	16	3.1	27	5.3	67	6.1	4.36	11.5	195.9	60.2	36	290	6.5	5.2	3.5		

Rushing

Rushing
Player	Pos	G	GS	Att	Yds	TD	Lng	Y/A	Y/G	A/G
Patton	RB	16	15	152	543	4	28	3.6	33.9	9.5
Cooper	FB	16	11	98	330	1	23	3.4	20.6	6.1
Davis	RB	16	5	94	297	7	14	3.2	18.6	5.9
Easley	RB	12	1	76	224	1	9	2.9	18.7	6.3
Hofer	RB	12	0	60	193	1	12	3.2	16.1	5.0
Ring	RB	12	0	22	106	0	16	4.8	8.8	1.8
Montana	QB	16	16	25	95	2	20	3.8	5.9	1.6
Lawrence	RB	13	0	13	48	1	14	3.7	3.7	1.0
Solomon	WR	15	15	9	43	0	16	4.8	2.9	0.6
Clark	WR	16	16	3	32	0	18	10.7	2.0	0.2
Elliott	RB	4	0	7	29	0	9	4.1	7.3	1.8
Benjamin	QB	4	0	1	1	0	1	1.0	0.3	0.3
Team Total		16		560	1941	17	28	3.5	121.3	35.0
Opp Total		16		464	1918	10		4.1	119.9	29.0

Receiving

Receiving
Player	Pos	G	GS	Tgt	Rec	Yds	Y/R	TD	Lng	R/G	Y/G	Y/Tgt
Clark	WR	16	16	122	85	1105	13.0	4	78	5.3	69.1	9.1
Solomon	WR	15	15	112	59	969	16.4	8	60	3.9	64.6	8.7
Cooper	FB	16	11	71	51	477	9.4	0	50	3.2	29.8	6.7
Young	TE	16	16	52	37	400	10.8	5	29	2.3	25.0	7.7
Hofer	RB	12	0	34	27	244	9.0	0	22	2.3	20.3	7.2
Patton	RB	16	15	42	27	195	7.2	1	31	1.7	12.2	4.6
Wilson	WR	16	0	11	9	125	13.9	1	27	0.6	7.8	11.4
Easley	RB	12	1	12	9	62	6.9	0	21	0.8	5.2	5.2
Elliott	RB	4	0	11	7	81	11.8	0	19	1.8	20.3	7.4
Ramson	TE	11	0	7	4	45	11.3	0	16	0.4	4.1	6.4
Ring	RB	12	0	4	3	28	9.3	1	21	0.3	2.3	7.0
Shumann	WR	13	1	7	3	21	7.0	0	8	0.2	1.6	3.0
Lawrence	RB	13	0	5	3	10	3.3	0	5	0.2	0.8	2.0
Davis	RB	16	5	5	3	–1	–0.3	0	3	0.2	–0.1	–0.2
Peets	TE	5	0	1	1	5	5.0	0	5	0.2	1.0	5.0
Reese	NT	16	16	1	0	0		0		0.0	0.0	0.0
Team Total		16		497	328	3766	11.5	20	78	20.5	235.4	7.6
Opp Total		16			273	2845	11.5	16	67			

Kick Returns

Kick Returns
Player	Pos	G	GS	Ret	Yds	KRTD	Lng	Y/Ret
Lawrence	RB	13	0	17	437	1	92	25.7
Ring	RB	12	0	10	217	0	29	21.7
Lott	LCB	16	16	7	111	0	20	15.9
Wilson	WR	16	0	4	67	0	22	16.8
Jones	RB	1	0	3	43	0	22	14.3
Hicks	FS	16	16	1	22	0	22	22.0
Ramson	TE	11	0	1	12	0	12	12.0
Davis	RB	16	5	1	0	0	0	0.0
Patton	RB	16	15	1	0	0	0	0.0
Team Total		16		45	909	1	92	20.2
Opp Total		16		67	1389	0	55	20.7

Punt Returns

Punt Returns
Player	Pos	G	GS	Ret	Yds	PRTD	Lng	Y/Ret
Solomon	WR	15	15	29	173	0	19	6.0
Hicks	FS	16	16	19	171	0	39	9.0
Team Total		16		48	344	0	39	7.2
Opp Total		16		57	664	1	58	11.6

Kicking

Kicking
				0–19		20–29		30–39		40–49		50+		Scoring						
Player	Pos	G	GS	FGA	FGM	FGA	FGM	FGA	FGM	FGA	FGM	FGA	FGM	FGA	FGM	Lng	FG%	XPA	XPM	XP%
Wersching	K	12	0	2	2	7	7	7	4	7	4	0	0	23	17	48	73.9	30	30	100.0
Bahr	K	4	0	0	0	2	0	1	0	3	2	0	0	6	2	47	33.3	12	12	100.0
Team Total		16		2	2	9	7	8	4	10	6	0	0	29	19	48	65.5	42	42	100.0
Opp Total		16		1	1	9	6	6	3	6	2	1	1	23	13		56.5	30	29	

Punting

Punting
Player	Pos	G	GS	Pnt	Yds	Y/P	RetYds	NetYds	NY/P	Lng	TB	TB%	Pnt20	In20%	Black
Miller	P	16	0	93	3858	41.5	664	2894	31.1	65	15	16.1	14	15.1	0
Team Total		16		93	3858	41.5	664	2894	31.1	65	15	16.1	14	15.1	0
Opp Total		16		83	3433	41.4				66	5		17		0

Defense and Fumbles

Defense and Fumbles
				Def Interceptions				Fumbles						Tackles			
Player	Pos	G	GS	Int	Yds	IntTD	Lng	FF	Fmb	FR	Yds	FRTD	Sk	Comb	Ast	Total	Sfty
Audick	LT	16	16	0	0	0	0	0	0	2	0	0	0.0	0	0	0	0
Bahr	K	4	0	0	0	0	0	0	0	0	0	0	0.0	0	2	2	0
Board	RDE	16	11	0	0	0	0	1	0	0	0	0	7.0	28	25	53	0
Bunz	LILB	14	8	0	0	0	0	6	0	2	0	0	0.0	39	21	60	0
Choma	G	14	0	0	0	0	0	0	0	0	0	0	0.0	2	0	2	0
Churchman	DB	3	0	0	0	0	0	0	0	0	0	0	0.0	3	0	3	0
Cooper	FB	16	11	0	0	0	0	0	3	1	0	0	0.0	3	0	3	0
Cross	RG	16	16	0	0	0	0	0	0	0	0	0	0.0	2	2	4	0
Davis	RB	16	5	0	0	0	0	0	1	0	0	0	0.0	0	0	0	0
Dean	DE	11	2	0	0	0	0	0	0	0	0	0	12.0	25	16	9	0
Easley	RB	12	1	0	0	0	0	0	2	2	0	0	0.0	0	0	0	0
Elliott	RB	4	0	0	0	0	0	0	3	0	0	0	0.0	0	0	0	0
Fahnhorst	RT	16	16	0	0	0	0	0	0	2	0	0	0.0	0	0	0	0
Gervais	DB	8	0	0	0	0	0	0	0	0	0	0	0.0	7	4	3	0
Harper	LOLB	16	16	0	0	0	0	2	0	1	0	0	1.0	72	43	29	0
Harty	NT	14	0	0	0	0	0	0	0	0	0	0	0.5	9	2	7	0
Hicks	FS	16	16	9	239	1	72	1	1	4	80	1	0.0	76	60	16	0
Jones	RB	1	0	0	0	0	0	0	1	0	0	0	0.0	0	0	0	0
Kugler	DE	13	0	0	0	0	0	0	0	0	0	0	1.0	12	9	3	0
Lawrence	RB	13	0	0	0	0	0	1	3	0	0	0	0.0	5	3	2	0
Leopold	LB	16	2	0	0	0	0	1	0	2	0	0	0.5	65	42	23	0
Lott	LCB	16	16	7	117	3	41	5	1	2	0	0	0.0	89	52	37	0
Martin	DB	15	0	1	0	0	0	0	0	0	0	0	0.0	18	14	4	0
McColl	LB	16	0	1	22	0	22	0	0	0	0	0	1.0	19	13	6	0
Montana	QB	16	16	0	0	0	0	0	2	0	0	0	0.0	0	0	0	0
Patton	RB	16	15	0	0	0	0	0	3	0	0	0	0.0	0	0	0	0
Pillers	RDE	14	6	0	0	0	0	1	0	0	0	0	7.0	53	32	21	0
Puki	RILB	16	6	0	0	0	0	0	0	2	0	0	0.0	51	24	27	0
Quillan	C	16	16	0	0	0	0	0	1	0	0	0	0.0	0	0	0	0
Ramson	TE	11	0	0	0	0	0	0	0	0	0	0	0.0	3	1	2	0
Reese	NT	16	16	0	0	0	0	0	0	0	0	0	0.5	53	36	17	0
Reynolds	RILB	16	16	1	0	0	0	2	0	0	0	0	1.0	117	61	56	0
Ring	RB	12	0	0	0	0	0	0	0	0	0	0	1.0	21	18	3	0
Shumann	WR	13	1	0	0	0	0	0	1	0	0	0	0.0	0	0	0	0
Solomon	WR	15	15	0	0	0	0	0	3	2	0	0	0.0	0	0	0	0
Stuckey	LDE	15	15	0	0	0	0	0	0	1	0	0	2.5	49	33	16	0
Tautolo	LB	5	0	0	0	0	0	0	0	0	0	0	0.0	10	9	1	0
Turner	ROLB	16	14	1	0	0	0	0	0	3	0	0	3.0	84	58	26	0
Williamson	SS	16	16	4	44	0	28	1	0	2	3	0	0.0	82	51	31	0
Wilson	WR	16	0	0	0	0	0	0	0	1	0	0	0.0	12	5	7	0
Wright	16	16	3	26	0	26	2	0	2	0	0	0.0	75	57	18	0	
Team Total		16		27	448	4	72	21	26	32	83	1	36.0	0	0	0	0
Opp Total		16															

Scoring Summary

Scoring Summary
				Touchdowns								PAT		FG				
Player	Pos	G	GS	RshTD	RecTD	PRTD	KRTD	FRTD	IntTD	OthTD	AllTD	XPM	XPA	FGM	FGA	Sfty	Pts	Pts/G
Wersching	K	12	0	0	0	0	0	0	0	0	0	30	30	17	23	0	81	6.8
Solomon	WR	15	15	0	8	0	0	0	0	0	8	0	0	0	0	0	48	3.2
Davis	RB	16	5	7	0	0	0	0	0	0	7	0	0	0	0	0	42	2.6
Patton	RB	16	15	4	1	0	0	0	0	0	5	0	0	0	0	0	30	1.9
Young	TE	16	16	0	5	0	0	0	0	0	5	0	0	0	0	0	30	1.9
Clark	WR	16	16	0	4	0	0	0	0	0	4	0	0	0	0	0	24	1.5
Bahr	K	4	0	0	0	0	0	0	0	0	0	12	12	2	6	0	18	4.5
Lott	LCB	16	16	0	0	0	0	0	3	0	3	0	0	0	0	0	18	1.1
Hicks	FS	16	16	0	0	0	0	1	1	0	2	0	0	0	0	0	12	0.8
Lawrence	RB	13	0	1	0	0	1	0	0	0	2	0	0	0	0	0	12	0.9
Montana	QB	16	16	2	0	0	0	0	0	0	2	0	0	0	0	0	12	0.8
Cooper	FB	16	11	1	0	0	0	0	0	0	1	0	0	0	0	0	6	0.4
Easley	RB	12	1	1	0	0	0	0	0	0	1	0	0	0	0	0	6	0.5
Hofer	RB	12	0	1	0	0	0	0	0	0	1	0	0	0	0	0	6	0.5
Ring	RB	12	0	0	1	0	0	0	0	0	1	0	0	0	0	0	46	0.5
Wilson	WR	16	0	0	1	0	0	0	0	0	1	0	0	0	0	0	6	0.4
Team Total		16		17	20	0	1	1	4	0	43	42	42	19	27	0	357	
Opp Total	16																	

=== Statistical comparison ===
	San Francisco 49ers	Opponents
First downs	317	280
First downs rushing	110	113
First downs passing	183	144
First downs penalty	24	23
Third down efficiency	114/259	87/224
Fourth down efficiency	0/0	0/0
Net yards rushing	1941	1918
Rushing attempts	560	454
Yards per rush	3.5	4.1
Passing – Completions/attempts	328/517	273/514
Times sacked-total yards	29–223	36–290
Interceptions thrown	13	27
Net yards passing	3543	2845
Total net yards	5484	4763
Punt returns-total yards	48–344	57–664
Kickoff returns-total yards	45–909	67–1389
Interceptions-total return yards	27–448	13–297
Punts-average yardage	93–41.5	83–41.4
Fumbles-lost	26–12	36–21
Penalties-total yards	92–752	108–866
Time of possession	31:38	28:22
Turnovers	25	48

=== Quarter-by-quarter ===
49ers Quarter-by-quarter
	1	2	3	4	T
49ers	80	100	88	89	357
Opponents	40	76	55	79	250

Touchdown Log

49ers Touchdown Log
Wk	Opp	Qtr	Distance	Type	Detail

Field Goal Log

49ers Field Goal Log
Wk	Opp	Qtr	Distance	Detail

Opponent Touchdown Log

Opponent Touchdown Log
Wk	Opp	Qtr	Distance	Type	Detail

Opponent Field Goal Log

Opponent Field Goal Log
Wk	Opp	Qtr	Type	Detail

== Postseason ==
Round	Date	Opponent (seed)	Result	Record	Venue	Attendance	Recap
Divisional	January 3, 1982	New York Giants (5)	W 38–24	1–0	Candlestick Park	58,360	Recap
NFC Championship	January 10, 1982	Dallas Cowboys (2)	W 28–27	2–0	Candlestick Park	60,525	Recap
Super Bowl XVI	January 24, 1982	vs. Cincinnati Bengals (A1)	W 26–21	3–0	Pontiac Silverdome	81,270	Recap

=== 1981 NFC Divisional Playoffs (Sunday, January 3, 1982): vs. (5) New York Giants ===
1981 NFC Divisional Playoff: New York Giants at San Francisco 49ers – Game summary

Quarter	1	2	3	4	Total
Giants (1–1)	7	3	7	7	24
49ers (1–0)	7	17	0	14	38

at Candlestick Park • San Francisco, California

- Date: January 3, 1982
- Game time: 2:00 p.m. PST
- Game weather: 42 °F (6 °C); wind 11
- Game attendance: 58,360
- Referee: Ben Dreith
- TV announcers (CBS): Pat Summerall (play-by-play), John Madden (analyst) and Irv Cross (sideline)

Team	Category	Player	Statistics
NYG	Passing	Scott Brunner	16/37, 290 Yds, 3 TDs, 2 INTs
NYG	Rushing	Rob Carpenter	17 CAR, 61 YDS
NYG	Receiving	Johnny Perkins	7 REC, 121 YDS, 2 TDs
SF	Passing	Joe Montana	20/31, 304 Yds, 2 TDs, 1 INT
SF	Rushing	Earl Cooper	7 CAR, 52 YDS
SF	Receiving	Freddie Solomon	6 REC, 107 YDS, 1 TD

Scoring summary

Quarter	Time	Drive			Team	Scoring information	Score	
Quarter	Time	Plays	Yards	TOP	Team	Scoring information	NYG	SF
1	9:03				49ers	Young 8-yard touchdown reception from Montana, Wersching kick good	0	7
1	2:45				Giants	Gray 72-yard touchdown reception from Brunner, Danelo kick good	7	7
2	14:57				49ers	22-yard field goal by Wersching	7	10
2	12:04				49ers	Solomon 59-yard touchdown reception from Montana, Wersching kick good	7	17
2	10:24				49ers	Patton 25-yard touchdown run, Wersching kick good	7	24
2	5:32				Giants	48-yard field goal by Danelo	10	24
3	11:13				Giants	Perkins 59-yard touchdown reception from Brunner, Danelo kick good	17	24
4	10:37				49ers	Ring 3-yard touchdown run, Wersching kick good	17	31
4	3:11	—	—	—	49ers	Interception returned 20 yards for touchdown by Lott, Wersching kick good	17	38
4	1:50				Giants	Perkins 17-yard touchdown reception from Brunner, Danelo kick good	24	38
"TOP" = time of possession. For other American football terms, see Glossary of American football.							24	38

- Point spread: 49ers –6
- Over/under: 38.0 (over)
- Time of game:

Giants	Game Statistics	49ers
14	First downs	24
22–65	Rushes–yards	34–135
290	Passing yards	304
16–37–2	Passes	20–31–1
2–9	Sacked–yards	3–16
281	Net passing yards	288
346	Total yards	423
162	Return yards	147
4–43.8	Punts	5–41.2
4–2	Fumbles–lost	2–0
8–61	Penalties–yards	14–145
25:42	Time of possession	34:18

Individual stats

- Passing: Montana – 20/31, 304 YDS, 2 TDs, 1 INT
- Rushing: Cooper – 7 CAR, 52 YDS; Patton – 7 CAR, 32 YDS, 1 TD; Clark – 1 CAR, 6 YDS
- Receiving: Solomon – 6 REC, 107 YDS, 1 TD; Clark – 5 REC, 104 YDS: Patton – 2 REC, 38 YDS, 1 TD;
- Kickoff returns: Lawrence – 3 KR, 88 YDS;
- Punt returns: Solomon – 1 PR, 22 YDS
- Punting: Miller – 5 PUNTS, 206 YDS
- Kicking: Wersching – 5/5 PAT; 1/2 FG
- Sacks: Harper – 1.0; Turner – 1.0
- Interceptions: Lott – 2 INT, 32 YDS, 1 TD
- 49ers Missed Field Goals: Wersching 50

Officials

- Referee: (#12) Ben Dreith
- Umpire: (#12) Dave Hamilton
- Head linesman: (#15) Ray Dodez
- Line judge: (#9) Jack Fette
- Back judge: (#9) Banks Williams
- Side judge: (#4) Ed Ward
- Field judge: (#14) Jack Vaughn
- Alternate Official: (#16) Jack Johnson

The Giants were making their first appearance in the postseason since 1963. First-year starting quarterback Joe Montana led the 49ers to victory in his debut playoff game, completing 20 of 31 passes for 304 yards and 2 touchdowns, with 1 interception. His top target in the game was receiver Dwight Clark, who caught 5 passes for 104 yards.

=== 1981 NFC Championship Game (Sunday, January 10, 1982): vs. (2) Dallas Cowboys ===
1981 NFC Championship Game: Dallas Cowboys at San Francisco 49ers – Game summary

Quarter	1	2	3	4	Total
Cowboys (1–1)	10	7	0	10	27
49ers (2–0)	7	7	7	7	28

at Candlestick Park • San Francisco, California

- Date: January 10, 1982
- Game time: 2:00 p.m. PST
- Game weather: 43 °F (6 °C); relative humidity 73%; wind 4 miles per hour (6.4 km/h; 3.5 kn)
- Game attendance: 60,525
- Referee: Jim Tunney
- TV announcers (CBS): Vin Scully (play-by-play), Hank Stram (color commentator) and Irv Cross (sideline reporter)

Team	Category	Player	Statistics
DAL	Passing	Danny White	16/24, 173 YDS, 2 TDs, 1 INT
DAL	Rushing	Tony Dorsett	22 CAR, 91 YDS, 1 TD
DAL	Receiving	James Jones	3 REC, 17 YDS
SF	Passing	Joe Montana	22/35, 286 YDS, 3 TDs, 3 INTs
SF	Rushing	Lenvil Elliott	10 CAR, 48 YDS
SF	Receiving	Dwight Clark	8 REC, 120 YDS, 2 TDs

Scoring summary

Quarter	Time	Drive			Team	Scoring information	Score	
Quarter	Time	Plays	Yards	TOP	Team	Scoring information	DAL	SF
1	10:41	6	63		49ers	Solomon 8-yard touchdown reception from Montana, Wersching kick good	0	7
1	4:44	9	44		Cowboys	44-yard field goal by Septién	3	7
1	2:49	2	29		Cowboys	Hill 26-yard touchdown reception from White, Septién kick good	10	7
2	6:12	4	47		49ers	Clark 20-yard touchdown reception from Montana, Wersching kick good	10	14
2	2:30	8	80		Cowboys	Dorsett 5-yard touchdown run, Septién kick good	17	14
3	5:44	4	13		49ers	Davis 2-yard touchdown run, Wersching kick good	17	21
4	14:08	11	64		Cowboys	22-yard field goal by Septién	20	21
4	10:41	4	50		Cowboys	Cosbie 21-yard touchdown reception from White, Septién kick good	27	21
4	0:51	13	89		49ers	Clark 6-yard touchdown reception from Montana, Wersching kick good	27	28
"TOP" = time of possession. For other American football terms, see Glossary of American football.							27	28

- Point spread: 49ers +3
- Over/under: 42.0 (over)
- Time of game:

Cowboys	Game Statistics	49ers
16	First downs	26
32–115	Rushes–yards	31–127
173	Passing yards	286
16–24–1	Passes	22–35–3
4–38	Sacked–yards	3–20
135	Net passing yards	266
250	Total yards	393
102	Return yards	136
6–39.3	Punts	3–35.7
4–2	Fumbles–lost	3–3
5–39	Penalties–yards	7–106
32:57	Time of possession	27:03

Individual stats

- Passing: Montana – 22/35, 286 YDS, 3 TDs, 3 INTs
- Rushing: Elliott – 10 CAR, 48 YDS; Cooper – 8 REC, 35 YDS; Ring – 6 CAR, 27 YDS; Solomon – 1 CAR, 14 YDS; Easley – 2 CAR, 6 YDS; Davis – 1 CAR, 2 YDS, 1 TD; Montana – 3 CAR, –5 YDS
- Receiving: Clark – 8 REC, 120 YDS, 2 TDs; Solomon – 6 REC, 75 YDS, 1 TD; Young – 4 REC, 45 YDS; Cooper – 2 REC, 11 YDS; Elliott – 1 REC, 24 YDS; Shumann – 1 REC, 11 YDS
- Kickoff returns: Lawrence – 3 KR, 60 YDS; Ring – 3 KR, 47 YDS
- Punt returns: Hicks – 2 PR, 21 YDS; Solomon – 1 PR, 3 YDS
- Punting: Miller – 3 PUNTS, 107 YDS
- Kicking: Wersching – 4/4 PAT
- Sacks: Pillers – 2.0; Board – 1.0; Stuckey – 1.0
- Interceptions: Leopold – 1 INT, 5 YDS

Officials

- Referee: (#3) Jim Tunney
- Umpire: (#5) Bob Boylston
- Head linesman: (#6) Ed Marion
- Line judge: (#16) Bob Beeks
- Back judge: (#5) Ray Douglas
- Side judge: (#9) Dean Look
- Field judge: (#20) Ed Merrifield
- Alternate Referee: (#20) Gordon McCarter
- Alternate Umpire: (#9) Dave Moss

The 49ers were making their third appearance in the NFC Championship Game. Their opponent was their opponent for the two previous NFC Championship Games-the Dallas Cowboys. In both previous matches, the 49ers had lost the game. The game is remembered for "The Catch".

The play, remembered in 49er lore as "Red Right Tight—Sprint Right Option" had called for both the primary receiver, Solomon, and Dwight Clark to line up on the right. Montana was supposed to roll to his right and find Solomon. Clark's pattern called for him to cut left across the end zone, stop, and immediately reverse his path to the right. If Solomon were covered, it would be up to Montana to find Clark. Due to the pressure, Montana's pass was high, but Clark was in position to make his memorable grab. Future New England Patriots/Tampa Bay Buccaneers quarterback Tom Brady, who grew up in the Bay Area, attended the game as a four-year-old. The 49ers were victorious despite an astonishing six turnovers, including three interceptions by Joe Montana.

A photograph of the catch, with Clark at the height of his leap and Everson Walls reaching out to try to block the ball, was featured on the cover of Sports Illustrated the following week.

=== Super Bowl XVI (Sunday, January 24, 1982): vs. (A1) Cincinnati Bengals ===
Super Bowl XVI: San Francisco 49ers vs. Cincinnati Bengals – Game summary

Quarter	1	2	3	4	Total
49ers (3–0)	7	13	0	6	26
Bengals (2–1)	0	0	7	14	21

at Pontiac Silverdome • Pontiac, Michigan

- Date: January 24, 1982
- Game time: 1:00 p.m. PST
- Game weather: indoors
- Game attendance: 81,270
- Referee: Pat Haggerty
- TV announcers (CBS): Pat Summerall (play-by-play), John Madden (analyst) and Irv Cross (sideline)

Team	Category	Player	Statistics
SF	Passing	Joe Montana	14/22, 157 YDS, 1 TD
SF	Rushing	Ricky Patton	17 CAR, 55 YDS
SF	Receiving	Freddie Solomon; Clark	4 REC, 52 YDS; 4 REC, 45 YDS
CIN	Passing	Ken Anderson	25/34, 300 Yds, 2 TDs, 2 INTs
CIN	Rushing	Pete Johnson	14 CAR, 36 YDS
CIN	Receiving	Dan Ross	11 REC, 104 YDS, 2 TDs

Scoring summary

Quarter	Time	Drive			Team	Scoring information	Score	
Quarter	Time	Plays	Yards	TOP	Team	Scoring information	SF	CIN
1	5:52	11	68	5:58	49ers	Montana 1-yard touchdown run, Wersching kick good	7	0
2	6:53	12	92	5:29	49ers	Cooper 11-yard touchdown reception from Montana, Wersching kick good	14	0
2	0:15	13	61	3:56	49ers	22-yard field goal by Wersching	17	0
2	0:02	1	0	0:03	49ers	26-yard field goal by Wersching	20	0
3	11:25	9	83	3:27	Bengals	Anderson 5-yard touchdown run, Breech kick good	20	7
4	10:06	7	53	3:52	Bengals	Dan Ross 4-yard touchdown reception from Anderson, Breech kick good	20	14
4	5:25	10	50	4:32	49ers	40-yard field goal by Wersching	23	14
4	1:57	7	16	3:00	49ers	23-yard field goal by Wersching	26	14
4	0:16	6	74	1:35	Bengals	Ross 3-yard touchdown reception from Anderson, Breech kick good	26	21
"TOP" = time of possession. For other American football terms, see Glossary of American football.							26	21

- Point spread: 49ers –1
- Over/under: 48.0 (under)
- Time of game: 3 hours, 21 minutes

49ers	Game Statistics	Bengals
20	First downs	24
40–127	Rushes–yards	24–72
157	Passing yards	300
14–22–0	Passes	25–34–2
1–9	Sacked–yards	5–16
148	Net passing yards	284
275	Total yards	356
98	Return yards	87
4–46.3	Punts	3–43.7
2–1	Fumbles–lost	2–2
8–65	Penalties–yards	8–57
30:34	Time of possession	29:26

Individual stats

- Passing: Montana – 14/22, 157 YDS, TD
- Rushing: Patton – 17 CAR, 55 YDS; Cooper – 9 REC, 34 YDS; Montana – 6 CAR, 18 YDS, 1 TD; Ring – 5 CAR, 17 YDS; Davis – 2 CAR, 5 YDS; Clark – 1 CAR, –2 YDS
- Receiving: Solomon – 4 REC, 52 YDS; Clark – 4 REC, 45 YDS; Cooper – 2 REC, 15 YDS, 1 TD; Wilson – 1 REC, 22 YDS; Young – 1 REC, 14 YDS; Patton – 1 REC, 6 YDS; Ring – 1 REC, 3 YDS
- Kickoff returns: Hicks – 1 KR, 23 YDS; Lawrence – 1 KR, 17 YDS\
- Punt returns: Hicks – 1 PR, 6 YDS
- Punting: Miller – 4 PUNTS, 185 YDS
- Kicking: Wersching – 2/2 PAT, 4/4 FG
- Sacks: Dean – 1.0; Leopold – 1.0; Reynolds – 1.0; Stuckey – 1.0; Turner – 1.0
- Interceptions: Hicks – 1 INT, 27 YDS; Wright – 1 INT, 25 YDS

Officials

- Referee: (#4) Pat Haggerty
- Umpire: (#7) Al Conway
- Head linesman: (#17) Jerry Bergman
- Line judge: (#16) Bob Beeks
- Back judge: (#20) Bill Swanson
- Side judge: (#19) Bob Rice
- Field judge: (#6) Don Hakes
- Alternate Referee: (#14) Gene Barth
- Alternate Umpire: (#8) Pat Harder

== Awards and records ==
- Joe Montana, Super Bowl Most Valuable Player
- Bill Walsh, National Football League Coach of the Year Award

== 1982 AFC-NFC Pro Bowl ==
Number	Player	Position	Conference
87	Dwight Clark	WR	NFC Pro Bowlers
51	Randy Cross	RG, Starter	NFC Pro Bowlers
74	Fred Dean	DE	NFC Pro Bowlers
22	Dwight Hicks	S	NFC Pro Bowlers
42	Ronnie Lott	RCB, Starter	NFC Pro Bowlers
16	Joe Montana	QB, Starter	NFC Pro Bowlers

== Media ==
Pre season Local TV

Channel	Play-by-play	Color commentator(s)
KPIX-TV 5		

Local Radio

Flagship station	Play-by-play	Color commentator(s)	Sideline reporter(s)
KCBS–AM 740	Don Klein	Wayne Walker	
