= 1980 San Francisco 49ers season =

American football team season

- Owner: Edward J. DeBartolo Jr.
- General manager: Bill Walsh
- Head coach: Bill Walsh
- Defensive coordinator: Chuck Studley
- Home stadium: Candlestick Park

Results
- Record: 6–10
- Division place: 3rd NFC West
- Playoffs: Did not qualify
- Pro Bowlers: none

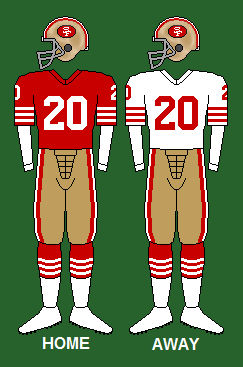
The uniform of the San Francisco 49ers, 1976-1983

The 1980 San Francisco 49ers season was the franchise's 31st season in the National Football League and their 35th overall. This was the second year with the team for both head coach Bill Walsh and quarterback Joe Montana, who became the starter in week seven, replacing Steve DeBerg.

The 49ers looked to improve on their previous output of 2–14 (both of the two previous seasons); despite succeeding in improving their record, having posted a 6–10 record, they failed to make the playoffs for the eighth consecutive season.

On December 7, 1980, the 49ers rallied from down 35–7, scoring 31 unanswered points to defeat the winless New Orleans Saints in overtime. This was the last full season (excluding the strike shortened 1982 season) until 1999 that the 49ers finished with fewer than ten wins.

== Offseason ==
=== Draft ===
1980 San Francisco 49ers draft
Round	Pick	Player	Position	College	Notes
1	13	Earl Cooper	Fullback	Rice	from N. Y. Jets
1	20	Jim Stuckey	Defensive tackle	Clemson	from Denver
2	39	Keena Turner *	Linebacker	Purdue	from Minnesota
3	65	Jim Miller	Punter	Ole Miss	from Minnesota
3	77	Craig Puki	Linebacker	Tennessee	
4	84	Ricky Churchman	Safety	Texas	
4	98	David Hodge	Linebacker	Houston	
5	112	Kenneth Times	Defensive Tackle	Southern	
6	139	Herb Williams	Safety	Southern	
8	210	Bobby Leopold	Linebacker	Notre Dame	
9	237	Dan Hartwig	Quarterback	Cal Lutheran	
Made roster * Made at least one Pro Bowl during career

== Personnel ==
=== Staff / Coaches ===
1980 San Francisco 49ers staff
Front office: Owner and President – Edward J. DeBartolo, Jr.; General manager – Bill Walsh; Director of Football Operations – John McVay; Head coaches: Head coach – Bill Walsh; Offensive coaches: Quarterbacks – Sam Wyche; Running Backs – Billie Matthews; Receivers – Milt Jackson; Tight Ends – Bruce Coslet; Offensive line – Bobb McKittrick	Defensive coaches: Defensive coordinator – Chuck Studley; Defensive line – Bill McPherson; Linebackers – Norb Hecker; Defensive Backs – George Seifert; Special teams coaches: Special teams – Milt Jackson; Strength and conditioning: Strength and Conditioning – Al Vermeil

=== Roster ===
1980 San Francisco 49ers roster
Quarterbacks (QB): 17 Steve DeBerg; 19 Gary Huff; 16 Joe Montana; Running backs (RB): 49 Earl Cooper; 35 Lenvil Elliott; 38 Bob Ferrell; 42 Ricky Patton; 47 Don Woods; Wide receivers (WR): 87 Dwight Clark; 89 James Owens; 85 Jimmy Robinson; 88 Freddie Solomon; Tight ends (TE): 82 Lewis Gilbert; 80 Eason Ramson; 86 Charle Young	Offensive linemen (OL): 68 John Ayers G; 77 Jean Barrett T; 64 Ken Bungarda T; 51 Randy Cross G; 62 Walt Downing G/C; 71 Keith Fahnhorst T; 56 Fred Quillan C; 67 Ron Singleton T; Defensive linemen (DL): 65 Lawrence Pillers DE; 78 Archie Reese DT; 79 Jim Stuckey DE; 90 George Visger DT; 74 Jimmy Webb DE; 60 Jerry Wilkinson DE	Linebackers (LB): 57 Dan Bunz MLB; 59 Willie Harper OLB; 55 Scott Hilton MLB; 52 Bobby Leopold OLB; 54 Craig Puki OLB; 50 Terry Tautolo OLB; 58 Keena Turner OLB; Defensive backs (DB): 33 Ricky Churchman SS; 28 Charles Cornelius CB; 22 Dwight Hicks FS; 44 Charles Johnson CB; 26 Ray Rhodes CB; 29 Gerard Williams CB; 23 Herb Williams FS; Special teams (ST): 3 Jim Miller P; 14 Ray Wersching K	Reserve: 76 Dwaine Board DE (IR); 48 Phil Francis RB (IR); 36 Paul Hofer RB (IR); 75 Ted Vincent DT (Exempt); Rookies in italics

== Preseason ==
Week	Date	Opponent	Result	Record	Venue	Attendance
1	August 9	Oakland Raiders	W 33–14	1–0	Candlestick Park	55,585
2	August 16	at San Diego Chargers	W 17–14	2–0	San Diego Stadium	48,836
3	August 23	Seattle Seahawks	L 7–10	2–1	Candlestick Park	41,841
4	August 30	vs. Kansas City Chiefs	W 31–21	3–1	Arizona Stadium	27,000

== Schedule ==
Week	Date	Opponent	Result	Record	Venue	Attendance
1	September 7	at **New Orleans Saints**	**W** 26–23	1–0	Louisiana Superdome	58,621
2	September 14	St. Louis Cardinals	**W** 24–21 (OT)	2–0	Candlestick Park	49,999
3	September 21	at New York Jets	**W** 37–27	3–0	Shea Stadium	50,608
4	September 28	**Atlanta Falcons**	**L** 17–20	3–1	Candlestick Park	56,518
5	October 5	at **Los Angeles Rams**	**L** 26–48	3–2	Anaheim Stadium	62,188
6	October 12	at Dallas Cowboys	**L** 14–59	3–3	Texas Stadium	63,399
7	October 19	**Los Angeles Rams**	**L** 17–31	3–4	Candlestick Park	55,360
8	October 26	Tampa Bay Buccaneers	**L** 23–24	3–5	Candlestick Park	51,925
9	November 2	at Detroit Lions	**L** 13–17	3–6	Pontiac Silverdome	78,845
10	November 9	at Green Bay Packers	**L** 16–23	3–7	Milwaukee County Stadium	54,475
11	November 16	at Miami Dolphins	**L** 13–17	3–8	Miami Orange Bowl	45,135
12	November 23	New York Giants	**W** 12–0	4–8	Candlestick Park	38,574
13	November 30	New England Patriots	**W** 21–17	5–8	Candlestick Park	45,254
14	December 7	**New Orleans Saints**	**W** 38–35	6–8	Candlestick Park	37,949
15	December 14	at **Atlanta Falcons**	**L** 10–35	6–9	Atlanta Fulton County Stadium	55,767
16	December 21	Buffalo Bills	**L** 13–18	6–10	Candlestick Park	37,476
Note: Intra-division opponents are in **bold** text.

=== Game summaries ===
==== Week 14: vs. New Orleans Saints ====
Week 14: New Orleans Saints at San Francisco 49ers – Game summary

Quarter	1	2	3	4	OT	Total
Saints	14	21	0	0	0	**35**
**49ers**	0	7	14	14	3	**38**

at Candlestick Park, San Francisco, California

- Date: Sunday, December 7
- Game time: 1:00 p.m.
- Game weather: 48 °F or 8.9 °C, wind 12 miles per hour (19 km/h; 10 kn)
- Referee: Dick Jorgensen
- TV announcers (CBS): Jim Kelly & Jim Hill
- Pro-Football-Reference.com

Game information

**First quarter**

- NO – Ike Harris 33-yard pass from Archie Manning (Benny Ricardo kick) – **Saints 7–0**
- NO – Henry Childs 21-yard pass from Archie Manning (Benny Ricardo kick) – **Saints 14–0**

**Second quarter**

- NO – Jack Holmes 1-yard run (Benny Ricardo kick) – **Saints 21–0**
- SF – Freddie Solomon 57-yard punt return (Ray Wersching kick) – **Saints 21–7**
- NO – Jack Holmes 1-yard run (Benny Ricardo kick) – **Saints 28–7**
- NO – Ike Harris 41-yard pass from Archie Manning (Benny Ricardo kick) – **Saints 35–7**

**Third quarter**

- SF – Joe Montana 1-yard run (Ray Wersching kick) – **Saints 35–14**
- SF – Dwight Clark 71-yard pass from Joe Montana (Ray Wersching kick) – **Saints 35–21**

**Fourth quarter**

- SF – Freddie Solomon 14-yard pass from Joe Montana (Ray Wersching kick) – **Saints 35–28**
- SF – Lenvil Elliott 7-yard run (Ray Wersching kick) – **Tie 35–35**

**Overtime**

- SF – Ray Wersching 36-yard field goal – **49ers 38–35**

**Saints**

- Archie Manning
  24/38, 377 Yds, 3 TD, INT
- Tony Galbreath
  16 Rush, 86 Yds
- Henry Childs
  8 Rec, 144 Yds, TD

**49ers**

- Joe Montana
  24/36, 285 Yds, 2 TD
- Lenvil Elliott
  25 Rush, 125 Yds, TD
- Dwight Clark
  6 Rec, 155 Yds, TD

The 49ers fought back from a 28-point deficit in the second half to win in overtime 38–35. The game was named as #8 on NFL Top 10 on Top Ten Comebacks.

==== Week 16: vs. Buffalo Bills ====
Team	1	2	3	4	Total
• Bills	6	7	5	0	18
49ers	6	0	7	0	13

- Date: December 21
- Location: Candlestick Park, San Francisco, California
- Game start: 1:00 p.m.
- Game weather: 53 °F or 11.7 °C, wind 6 miles per hour (9.7 km/h; 5.2 kn) RAIN
- Referee: Ben Dreith
- TV announcers (NBC): Don Criqui and Mike Haffner

== Standings ==
NFC West
	W	L	T	PCT	DIV	CONF	PF	PA	STK
^{(1)} Atlanta Falcons	12	4	0	.750	5–1	10–2	405	272	L1
^{(5)} Los Angeles Rams	11	5	0	.688	5–1	9–3	424	289	W2
San Francisco 49ers	6	10	0	.375	2–4	4–8	320	415	L2
New Orleans Saints	1	15	0	.063	0–6	0–12	291	487	L1
