= Walt Easley =

American football player (1957–2013)

No. 31
- Position: Fullback

Personal information
- Born: September 8, 1957; Charleston, West Virginia
- Died: February 14, 2013 (aged 55); Charleston, West Virginia
- Listed height: 6 ft 2 in (1.88 m)
- Listed weight: 226 lb (103 kg)

Career information
- High school: Stonewall Jackson
- College: West Virginia

Career history
- San Francisco 49ers (1981–1982); Chicago Blitz (1983); Pittsburgh Maulers (1984)

Awards and highlights
- Super Bowl Champion (XVI)

Career statistics
- Rushing yards: 235
- Rush attempts: 81
- Rushing touchdowns: 1
- Receptions: 9
- Games played: 13
- Receiving yards: 62
- Stats at Pro Football Reference

Walter Edward Easley (September 8, 1957 – February 14, 2013) was a fullback in the NFL and USFL.

He played his college football for the West Virginia Mountaineers, running for 1,773 yards and 19 touchdowns. In the NFL, he played two years for the San Francisco 49ers and was a member of the Super Bowl XVI championship team. With the 49ers, he rushed for 235 yards on 81 carries and caught nine passes for 62 yards. He later played for the Chicago Blitz and Pittsburgh Maulers in the USFL.
