= Mike Wilson (wide receiver) =

American football player and coach (born 1958)

No. 85
- Position: Wide receiver

Personal information
- Born: December 19, 1958 (age 67); Los Angeles, California, U.S.
- Listed height: 6 ft 3 in (1.91 m)
- Listed weight: 213 lb (97 kg)

Career information
- High school: Carson (CA)
- College: Washington State
- NFL draft: 1981: 9th round, 246th overall pick

Career history

Playing
- Dallas Cowboys (1981)*; San Francisco 49ers (1981–1990)
- * Offseason or practice squad member only

Coaching
- Stanford University (1992–1994) Wide receivers and tight ends coach; Oakland Raiders (1995–1996) Wide receivers coach; USC (1997–1999) Wide receivers coach; Arizona Cardinals (2004) Tight ends coach; Arizona Cardinals (2005–2006) Wide receivers coach; Las Vegas Locomotives (2009–2010) Wide receivers coach; Cleveland Browns (2011–2012) Wide receivers coach; Los Angeles Wildcats (2020) Wide receiver coach; Helvetic Guards (2022–2023) Wide receiver coach

Awards and highlights
- 4× Super Bowl champion (XVI, XIX, XXIII, XXIV); 2× UFL champion (2009, 2010)

Career NFL statistics
- Receptions: 159
- Receiving yards: 2,199
- Receiving touchdowns: 15
- Stats at Pro Football Reference

Michael Ruben Wilson (born December 19, 1958) is an American football coach and former wide receiver for the San Francisco 49ers of the National Football League (NFL). He is one of only a few NFL players to be a member of four Super Bowl championship teams. He played college football at Washington State University.

== Early life ==
Wilson attended Carson High School where he played in a run-oriented offense and received All-Los Angeles City honors. He also practiced basketball and track.

He graduated in 1976 and accepted a football scholarship from Washington State University. Although he struggled with dropped passes as a sophomore, that would end up being his best season, registering 31 receptions for 451 yards and 3 touchdowns.

The next year quarterback Jack Thompson graduated and the offense changed to a ground attack, with him playing the role of a blocking wide receiver in his last two seasons.

As a junior, he posted 6 receptions for 80 yards and 3 touchdowns. As a senior, he was slowed down by a hamstring injury that forced him to miss 4 games, making 11 receptions for 212 yards. He finished his college career with 48 receptions for 743 yards (15.5-yard average), 6 touchdowns and 176 rushing yards.

== Professional career ==
=== Dallas Cowboys ===
Wilson was selected by the Dallas Cowboys in the ninth round (246th overall) of the 1981 NFL draft. At the time of his arrival, the team already had in its roster Drew Pearson, Tony Hill, Butch Johnson and also drafted Doug Donley in the second round that year. He was waived on August 24, after the team decided to keep only four wide receivers.

=== San Francisco 49ers ===
On August 27, 1981, he signed as a free agent with the San Francisco 49ers, where he earned the team's third wide receiver job behind Dwight Clark and Freddie Solomon. He also registered 12 special teams tackles, on a season when the franchise won its first Super Bowl. On September 9, 1982, he was placed on the injured reserve list.

In the 1983 NFC championship game, he had one of his best performances after replacing an injured Clark and finishing with 8 receptions for 57 yards and 2 touchdowns in a losing effort.

He became a starter in 1988 after Clark retired, but the next year he was passed over by John Taylor who would remain the starter playing alongside Jerry Rice. His combination of size and strength was not common at the time for a wide receiver, so he was also used as a tight end in some passing situations.

Wilson retired in 1991, after the team did not offer him a contract. He helped the 49ers win 4 Super Bowls, 4 NFC Championships and qualify for the NFL post-season in 9 out of his 10 seasons.

== NFL career statistics ==
Legend
	Won the Super Bowl
**Bold**	Career high

=== Regular season ===
Year	Team	Games		Receiving				
Year	Team	GP	GS	Rec	Yds	Avg	Lng	TD
1981	SF	**16**	0	9	125	13.9	27	1
1982	SF	6	1	6	80	13.3	27	1
1983	SF	15	3	30	433	14.4	49	0
1984	SF	13	3	17	245	14.4	44	1
1985	SF	**16**	0	10	165	**16.5**	**52**	2
1986	SF	11	1	9	104	11.6	18	1
1987	SF	11	8	29	**450**	15.5	46	**5**
1988	SF	**16**	**11**	**33**	405	12.3	31	3
1989	SF	**16**	1	9	103	11.4	19	1
1990	SF	**16**	0	7	89	12.7	34	0
		136	28	159	2,199	13.8	52	15

=== Playoffs ===
Year	Team	Games		Receiving				
Year	Team	GP	GS	Rec	Yds	Avg	Lng	TD
1981	SF	**3**	1	3	43	**14.3**	22	0
1983	SF	2	**2**	**9**	**83**	9.2	**26**	**2**
1984	SF	**3**	0	5	62	12.4	18	0
1985	SF	1	0	1	14	14.0	14	0
1987	SF	1	1	4	50	12.5	23	0
1988	SF	**3**	0	1	12	12.0	12	0
1989	SF	**3**	0	1	7	7.0	7	0
1990	SF	2	0	0	0	0.0	0	0
		18	4	24	271	11.3	26	2

== Coaching career ==
He began his coaching career at Stanford (1992–94) where he coached wide receivers and tight ends on the staff of former 49ers coach Bill Walsh, followed by two seasons as wide receivers coach of the Oakland Raiders (1995–96). From 1997 to 1999 he served as wide receivers coach at USC.

After four years in private business (2000–03), Wilson joined the Arizona Cardinals as tight ends coach in 2004. From 2005 to 2006 he coached the Cardinals wide receivers.

Wilson was the wide receivers coach for the Las Vegas franchise of the United Football League, while helping the team win two championships. He was the Cleveland Browns wide receivers coach from 2011 to 2012.

In 2019, he became the wide receivers coach for the Los Angeles Wildcats of the XFL.
