= Rick Gervais =

American football player (born 1959)

No. 24
- Position: Safety

Personal information
- Born: November 4, 1959 (age 67); Bend, Oregon, U.S.
- Listed height: 5 ft 11 in (1.80 m)
- Listed weight: 190 lb (86 kg)

Career information
- High school: Bend
- College: Stanford
- NFL draft: 1981: undrafted

Career history
- San Francisco 49ers (1981–1983)

Awards and highlights
- Super Bowl champion (XVI)

Career NFL statistics
- Sacks: 1
- Fumble recoveries: 1
- Stats at Pro Football Reference

Richard Paul Gervais (born November 4, 1959) is an American former professional football player who was a safety for the San Francisco 49ers of the National Football League (NFL) from 1981 to 1983. He played college football for the Stanford Cardinal. After his football career, he started a business called KG Investment.
