= Arrington Jones =

American football player and coach (born 1959)

No. 40
- Position: Running back

Personal information
- Born: February 16, 1959 (age 67); Richmond, Virginia, U.S.
- Listed height: 6 ft 0 in (1.83 m)
- Listed weight: 225 lb (102 kg)

Career information
- High school: John Marshall (Richmond)
- College: Winston-Salem State
- NFL draft: 1981: 5th round, 122nd overall pick

Career history

Playing
- San Francisco 49ers (1981); Denver Broncos (1982)*; Washington Federals (1983)*; San Francisco 49ers (1983)*; Indianapolis Colts (1984)*
- * Offseason or practice squad member only

Coaching
- Virginia State (1986–1990) Special teams coordinator; Virginia State (1990–2000) Assistant head coach & offensive coordinator; Winston-Salem (2001–2003) Offensive coordinator; Virginia Union (2004–2007) Head coach; Delaware State (2011–2014) Offensive coordinator & quarterbacks coach

Awards and highlights
- CIAA coach of the Year (2007)

Career NFL statistics
- Kickoff return yards: 43
- Games played: 1
- Stats at Pro Football Reference

Head coaching record
- Regular season: 21–19 (.525)
- Postseason: 0–2 (.000)
- Career: 21–21 (.500)

Arrington Jones III (born February 16, 1959) is an American former professional football player who was a running back for one season with the San Francisco 49ers of the National Football League (NFL). He was selected by the 49ers in the fifth round of the 1981 NFL draft after playing college football for the Winston-Salem State Rams.

== Early life ==
Jones attended John Marshall High School in Richmond, Virginia.

Jones played for the Winston-Salem State Rams of Winston-Salem State University from 1978 to 1981.

== Professional career ==
Jones was selected by the San Francisco 49ers of the NFL in the fifth round with the 122nd pick in the 1981 NFL draft. He fumbled two kickoff returns in the opening game of the 1981 season at Detroit. He was released after that game and never played another NFL game.

Jones signed with the Denver Broncos on February 12, 1982. He was released on July 21, 1982, after failing a physical.

On November 3, 1982, Jones was signed by the USFL's Washington Federals for the 1983 USFL season. He was released by the Federals on February 22, 1983.

Jones signed with the 49ers again on April 1, 1983. He was later released on August 10, 1983.

Jones signed with the Indianapolis Colts on May, 25, 1984, but was later released.

== Coaching career ==
Jones served as special teams coordinator for the Virginia State Trojans of Virginia State University from to 1986 to 1990. He was also assistant head coach and offensive coordinator from 1990 to 2000. The Trojans won the CIAA Championship in 1995.

He was offensive coordinator and recruiting coordinator for the Winston-Salem State Rams from 2001 to 2003. The Rams appeared in the CIAA Championship Game in 2001.

Jones served as head coach and offensive coordinator for the Virginia Union Panthers of Virginia Union University from 2004 to 2007, accruing a 21–21 record. He led the Panthers to a 9–1 regular season record in 2007, winning the CIAA Eastern Division Championship. The Panthers also earned a berth in the 2007 Pioneer Bowl, losing to the Tuskegee Golden Tigers. He was named the 2007 CIAA Coach of the Year. Jones resigned in March 2008, citing personal reasons.

Jones was the offensive coordinator and quarterbacks coach of the Delaware State Hornets of Delaware State University from 2011 to 2014.

== Head coaching record ==
Year	Team	Overall	Conference	Standing	Bowl/playoffs
Virginia Union Panthers (Central Intercollegiate Athletic Association) (2004–2007)
2004	Virginia Union	2–8	2–5	T–4th (Eastern)	
2005	Virginia Union	3–7	2–5	5th (Eastern)	
2006	Virginia Union	7–3	5–2	2nd (Eastern)	
2007	Virginia Union	9–3	7–1	1st (Eastern)	L Pioneer
Virginia Union:		21–21	16–13		
Total:		21–21			
National championship Conference title Conference division title or championship game berth
