= Milt Jackson (American football) =

American football player and coach (1943–2005)

No. 43, 36
- Positions: Safety, cornerback, wide receiver, punt returner

Personal information
- Born: October 16, 1943
- Died: August 23, 2005 (aged 61)
- Listed height: 6 ft 3 in (1.91 m)
- Listed weight: 200 lb (91 kg)

Career information
- High school: Grant Union (Sacramento, California)
- College: Tulsa (1965-1966)
- NFL draft: 1967: 7th round, 170th overall pick

Career history

Playing
- San Francisco 49ers (1967)*; San Jose Apaches (1967); Sacramento Capitols (1968–1969)
- * Offseason or practice squad member only

Coaching
- California Golden Bears (1975–1976) Linebackers coach; Oregon Ducks (1977–1978) Defensive backfield coach; UCLA Bruins (1979) Tight ends coach, offensive tackles coach & defensive tackles coach; San Francisco 49ers (1980–1982) Wide receivers coach & special teams coach; Buffalo Bills (1983–1984) Wide receivers coach; Philadelphia Eagles (1985) Running backs coach; Houston Oilers (1986–1988) Wide receivers coach; Indianapolis Colts (1989–1990) Wide receivers coach; Indianapolis Colts (1991) Offensive coordinator; Los Angeles Rams (1992–1993) Wide receivers coach; Atlanta Falcons (1994–1995) Wide receivers coach; Atlanta Falcons (1996) Assistant head coach; New York Giants (1997) Wide receivers coach; Seattle Seahawks (1998) Wide receivers coach; Baltimore Ravens (1999–2000) Wide receivers coach

Awards and highlights
- 2× Super Bowl champion (XVI, XXXV)
- Coaching profile at Pro Football Reference

Milton Jackson (October 16, 1943 – August 23, 2005) was an American football coach for 26 seasons. He had different coaching positions for the California Golden Bears, Oregon Ducks, UCLA Bruins, San Francisco 49ers, Buffalo Bills, Philadelphia Eagles, Houston Oilers, Indianapolis Colts, Los Angeles Rams, Atlanta Falcons, New York Giants, Seattle Seahawks, and Baltimore Ravens. Also, he was selected by the 49ers in the seventh round, but did not play for them. Instead, he played for the San Jose Apaches and Sacramento Capitols.

== Early life ==
Jackson was born on October 16, 1943. He attended Grant Union High School in Sacramento, California

== College career ==
Jackson played college football at the University of Tulsa.

== Professional playing career ==
=== San Francisco 49ers ===
Jackson was drafted in the seventh round of the 1967 NFL/AFL draft with the 170th overall pick by the San Francisco 49ers. He did not play for them.

=== San Jose Apaches ===
In 1967, Jackson played for the San Jose Apaches. He played punt returner and cornerback. On defense he had 5 interceptions for 82 yards and a touchdown. On punt returns he had 17 returns for 144 yards. He also scored two touchdowns.

=== Sacramento Capitols ===
In 1968, Jackson played for the Sacramento Capitols. He wore number 36 and played safety. They finished the season with a 5–7 record.

In 1969, he played receiver and cornerback. He had 10 catches for 112 yards on offense, and 4 interceptions for 22 yards on defense. The Capitols lost in the Pacific Division Playoff to the Las Vegas Cowboys. 1969 was his last season.

== Coaching career ==
=== California Golden Bears ===
In 1975, Jackson got his first coaching job. He became the Linebackers coach for the California Golden Bears. He would spend 1975 to 1976 at California. The Golden Bears were named Pacific-8 Conference Champions that season. Two of the Linebackers that he coached were drafted in the NFL after the 1976 season. (Jeff Barnes and Phil Heck)

=== Oregon Ducks ===
In 1977, he was the defensive backfield coach for the Oregon Ducks. They finished with a 2–9 record.

In 1978 they went 2–9 for the second season.

=== UCLA Bruins ===
He became the UCLA Bruins Tight Ends and Tackles coach for the 1979 season. They had a 5–6 record.

=== San Francisco 49ers ===
His first NFL coaching job came as the wide receivers and special teams coach of the San Francisco 49ers. In 1980 the 49ers recorded a 6–10 record.

Jackson was the wide receivers coach again in 1981, as the 49ers finished with a 13–3 record. In the conference championship, against the Dallas Cowboys, wide receiver Dwight Clark made a game-winning catch in the back of the end zone to get the San Francisco 49ers to the Super Bowl. The play would be known as The Catch. The 49ers would then go on to win the Super Bowl against the Cincinnati Bengals.

=== Buffalo Bills ===
After the 1982 season with the 49ers, he was named the wide receivers coach of the Buffalo Bills. They finished with a 8–8 record in 1983. He would coach them from 1983 to 1984 before going to the Philadelphia Eagles.

=== Philadelphia Eagles ===
He became the Philadelphia Eagles running backs coach in 1985. The Eagles had a 7–9 record. Running back Earnest Jackson rushed for 1028 yards that season.

=== Houston Oilers ===
He only coached one season with the Eagles before becoming the wide receivers coach of the Houston Oilers. Two receivers had 1000-yard seasons that year, Ernest Givins and Drew Hill. The Oilers had a 7–9 record in 1986.

He remained coach in 1987. They had a 9–6 record and made the playoffs.

His last season as the Oilers receivers coach was in 1988. The Oilers had a 10–6 record and made the playoffs. They lost to the Buffalo Bills in the divisional round.

=== Indianapolis Colts ===
He became the Indianapolis Colts receivers coach in 1989.

In 1990 the Colts had a 7–9 record. One receiver he coached made the pro bowl.

In 1991, he was promoted to become the Colts Offensive Coordinator. This was the highest position he held. The Colts had 1–15 record while he was coordinator and Jackson was fired following the season.

=== Los Angeles Rams ===
In 1992 he was the Los Angeles Rams wide receivers coach. The Rams were his sixth team in the NFL.

His last season with the Rams came in 1993, where they had a 5–11 record.

=== Atlanta Falcons ===
In 1994, he became receivers coach of the Atlanta Falcons. Two receivers he coached had 1000-yard seasons, Terrance Mathis and Andre Rison.

In 1995, with the Falcons, they recorded a 9–7 record but missed the playoffs. Three receivers he coached had 1000-yard seasons in 1995.

In 1996, he became the assistant head coach for the Falcons.

=== New York Giants ===
He became the New York Giants wide receivers coach in 1997. They had a 10-5-1 record. He only coached one season with the Giants.

=== Seattle Seahawks ===
He coached the Seattle Seahawks wide receivers in 1998.

=== Baltimore Ravens ===
1999 was his 25th year of coaching. He was a member of the Baltimore Ravens, serving as their receivers coach.

2000 was his 26th and final season as a coach. The Ravens recorded a 12–4 record and made the playoffs. They went on and won Super Bowl XXXV. It was 20 seasons after Jackson had won Super Bowl XVI. He retired following the season

== Later life ==
He died on August 23, 2005, from a heart attack. He was 61 at the time of his death.
