= Carlton Williamson =

American football player (born 1958)

No. 27
- Position: Safety

Personal information
- Born: June 12, 1958 (age 68); Atlanta, Georgia, U.S.
- Listed height: 6 ft 0 in (1.83 m)
- Listed weight: 204 lb (93 kg)

Career information
- High school: Brown
- College: Pittsburgh
- NFL draft: 1981: 3rd round, 65th overall pick

Career history
- San Francisco 49ers (1981–1988)

Awards and highlights
- 3× Super Bowl champion (XVI, XIX, XXIII); 2× Pro Bowl (1984, 1985); PFWA All-Rookie Team (1981)

Career NFL statistics
- Interceptions: 17
- Interception yards: 294
- Games played: 88
- Fumble recoveries: 3
- Stats at Pro Football Reference

Carlton Williamson (born June 12, 1958) is an American former professional football player who was a safety for the San Francisco 49ers of the National Football League (NFL). He played college football for the Pittsburgh Panthers was selected 65th overall by the 49ers in the third round of the 1981 NFL draft. Standing 6'0" and 200 lbs., Williamson was a two-time Pro Bowl selection in 1984 and 1985 and a three-time Super Bowl champion. He played in eight NFL seasons and his entire career with the 49ers from 1981 to 1988. In his career, he recorded 17 interceptions for 294 yards and 1 touchdown.
