= Saladin Martin =

American football player (born 1956)

No. 39, 29, 41
- Position: Defensive back

Personal information
- Born: January 17, 1956 (age 70); San Diego, California, U.S.
- Listed height: 6 ft 0 in (1.83 m)
- Listed weight: 180 lb (82 kg)

Career information
- High school: Lincoln (San Diego)
- College: San Diego State
- NFL draft: 1979: undrafted

Career history
- New York Giants (1979)*; New York Jets (1980); San Francisco 49ers (1981); Oakland Invaders (1983)
- * Offseason or practice squad member only

Awards and highlights
- Super Bowl champion (XVI)

Career NFL statistics
- Interceptions: 1
- Stats at Pro Football Reference

Saladin Martin (born January 17, 1956) is an American former professional football player who was a defensive back in the National Football League (NFL). He played college football for the San Diego State Aztecs.

== Early life ==
Martin prepped at Lincoln High in Southeast San Diego.

== College career ==
Martin played college football at San Diego State University.

== Professional career ==
Martin played in the NFL for the New York Jets and San Francisco 49ers in 1980 and 1981. He earned one Super Bowl ring in 1981 with the San Francisco 49ers in Super Bowl XVI.
