= Bobby Leopold =

American football player (born 1957)

No. 52, 53, 45
- Position: Linebacker

Personal information
- Born: October 18, 1957 (age 69); Port Arthur, Texas, U.S.
- Listed height: 6 ft 1 in (1.85 m)
- Listed weight: 215 lb (98 kg)

Career information
- High school: Abraham Lincoln (Port Arthur)
- College: Notre Dame
- NFL draft: 1980: 8th round, 210th overall pick

Career history
- San Francisco 49ers (1980–1983); New Jersey Generals (1984-1985); Green Bay Packers (1986–1987)

Awards and highlights
- Super Bowl champion (XVI); PFWA All-Rookie Team (1980); National champion (1977)

Career NFL statistics
- Sacks: 1
- Interceptions: 1
- Fumble recoveries: 1
- Stats at Pro Football Reference

Leroy Joseph "Bobby" Leopold Jr. (born October 18, 1957) is an American former professional football player who was a linebacker in the National Football League (NFL). He played in the NFL for the San Francisco 49ers from 1980 to 1983 and for the Green Bay Packers in 1986. He has also played with the New Jersey Generals of the USFL.
