= Jim Stuckey =

American football player (born 1958)

No. 79, 71
- Position: Defensive end

Personal information
- Born: June 21, 1958 (age 68); Cayce, South Carolina, U.S.
- Listed height: 6 ft 4 in (1.93 m)
- Listed weight: 251 lb (114 kg)

Career information
- High school: Airport (West Columbia, South Carolina)
- College: Clemson
- NFL draft: 1980: 1st round, 20th overall pick

Career history
- San Francisco 49ers (1980–1986); New York Jets (1986); San Diego Chargers (1987)*
- * Offseason or practice squad member only

Awards and highlights
- 2× Super Bowl champion (XVI, XIX); PFWA All-Rookie Team (1980); 2× First-team All-ACC (1978, 1979)

Career NFL statistics
- Sacks: 18.5
- Safeties: 1
- Fumble recoveries: 3
- Stats at Pro Football Reference

James Davis Stuckey (born June 21, 1958) is an American former professional football player who was a defensive end in the National Football League (NFL) for seven seasons during the 1980s. Stuckey played college football for the Clemson Tigers, and was recognized as an All-American. A first-round pick in the 1980 NFL draft, he played professionally for the San Francisco 49ers and New York Jets of the NFL.

Stuckey was born in Cayce, South Carolina. He attended Airport High School in West Columbia, South Carolina. While there from 1972 to 1976 he played middle linebacker and tight end.

Stuckey attended Clemson University, and played for the Clemson Tigers football team from 1976 to 1979. As a senior in 1979, he earned consensus first-team All-American honors.

He was drafted in the first round of the 1980 NFL draft by the 49ers. He was a member of the San Francisco 49ers Super Bowl XVI and Super Bowl XIX winning teams. One of his more notable accomplishments was sealing a victory over the Dallas Cowboys in the 1981 NFC title game by recovering a fumble from quarterback Danny White with 40 seconds left in the game. This play came shortly after The Catch, a touchdown reception by Stuckey's college teammate Dwight Clark.
