= Jim Miller (punter) =

American football player (born 1957)

No. 3, 12
- Position: Punter

Personal information
- Born: July 5, 1957 (age 69); Ripley, Mississippi, U.S.
- Listed height: 5 ft 11 in (1.80 m)
- Listed weight: 183 lb (83 kg)

Career information
- High school: Ripley
- College: Ole Miss
- NFL draft: 1980: 3rd round, 65th overall pick

Career history
- San Francisco 49ers (1980–1982); Dallas Cowboys (1983); Memphis Showboats (1985); New York Giants (1987)

Awards and highlights
- Super Bowl champion (XVI); PFWA All-Rookie Team (1980); Consensus All-American (1979); 2× First-team All-SEC (1978, 1979); Second-team All-SEC (1977)

Career NFL statistics
- Games played: 45
- Punts: 234
- Punt yards: 9,382
- Longest punt: 80
- Stats at Pro Football Reference

James Gordon Miller (born July 5, 1957) is an American former professional football player who was a punter in the National Football League (NFL) for the San Francisco 49ers, Dallas Cowboys, and New York Giants. He played college football for the Ole Miss Rebels, earning consensus All-American honors in 1979.

== Early life ==
Miller was born in Ripley, Mississippi and attended Ripley High School, where he played running back, wide receiver, cornerback and punter.

== College career ==
Miller accepted a football scholarship from the University of Mississippi, where he played for the Ole Miss Rebels from 1976 to 1979. He started punting barefoot as a freshman (in high school he had to wear a shoe by rule), ranking third in the Southeastern Conference with a 40.5-yard punt average. For a while he doubled as a flanker and punter.

As a sophomore, he led the NCAA with a 45.9-yard punting average, which was also a school and SEC record. As a junior, he finished with a 43.2-yard per punt average. As a senior, he averaged 44.6-yards per punt.

Miller set multiple school records with an 82-yard punt against South Carolina, punt average in a single-season (45.9), most punts in a game (12), career punt average (43.4-yard), punts in a career (266), punting yards in a single-season (3,283 yards) and total punt yards in a career (11,549).

In 1995, he was inducted into the Ole Miss Athletics Hall of Fame. He was named to the Ole Miss Team of the Century (1893-1992). In 2018, he was named an SEC legend.

== Professional career ==
=== San Francisco 49ers ===
Miller was selected in the third round (65th overall) of the 1980 NFL draft by the San Francisco 49ers, which had gone through three punters in three years. As a rookie, he was named to the All-rookie team after averaging 40.9 yards per punt. He was a part of the Super Bowl XVI championship team.

On August 29, 1983, he was waived before the start of the season, to make room for the signing of punter Tom Orosz. At the time, he ranked as the franchise's fourth all-time punter.

=== Dallas Cowboys ===
On November 18, 1983, he was signed as a free agent by the Dallas Cowboys to replace the injured rookie John Warren. He only played in three games, while splitting the punting duties with Danny White, with Miller handling the punts inside the 50-yard line. He was released after losing the preseason competition with Warren on September 6, 1984.

=== New York Giants ===
On October 14, 1987, he was signed during the NFL Strike. He punted in the fifth game against the Buffalo Bills, replacing an injured Sean Landeta, making 10 punts for a 34.5-yard average. He was cut on October 19.

== Personal life ==
Miller lives in Ripley, Mississippi with his wife. He worked as a football coach, teacher assistant and bus driver at Ripley Middle School.
