= Dwaine Board =

American football player and coach (born 1956)

No. 76
- Position: Defensive end

Personal information
- Born: November 29, 1956 (age 69); Rocky Mount, Virginia, U.S.
- Listed height: 6 ft 5 in (1.96 m)
- Listed weight: 248 lb (112 kg)

Career information
- High school: Franklin County (Rocky Mount)
- College: North Carolina A&T State
- NFL draft: 1979: 5th round, 137th overall pick

Career history

Playing
- Pittsburgh Steelers (1979)*; San Francisco 49ers (1979–1988); New Orleans Saints (1988)
- * Offseason or practice squad member only

Coaching
- San Francisco 49ers (1990–1993) Defensive line assistant; San Francisco 49ers (1994–2002) Defensive line coach; Seattle Seahawks (2003–2008) Defensive line coach; Oakland Raiders (2009) Defensive line coach; Cleveland Browns (2011–2012) Defensive line coach; Seattle Seahawks (2015–2017) Defensive line coach

Awards and highlights
- 4× Super Bowl champion (XVI, XIX, XXIII, XXIX)

Career NFL statistics
- Sacks: 61
- Fumble recoveries: 10
- Touchdowns: 1
- Stats at Pro Football Reference

Dwaine P. Board (born November 29, 1956) is an American former professional football player and coach in the National Football League (NFL). He played as a defensive end, primarily for the San Francisco 49ers from 1979 to 1988. He was later a defensive line coach.

Board played college football for the North Carolina A&T Aggies and was selected in the fifth round of the 1979 NFL draft by the Pittsburgh Steelers, but they released him in the preseason. Board subsequently signed with the 49ers, where he would spend all but one year of his NFL playing career.

Across 10 NFL seasons, Board recorded 61 sacks and 10 fumble recoveries. He was a member of the 49ers' Super Bowl winning teams; Super Bowl XVI, Super Bowl XIX and Super Bowl XXIII as a player, and Super Bowl XXIX as a coach.

On March 25, 2015, Board was hired as the defensive line coach for the Seattle Seahawks.
