= Eason Ramson =

American football player (born 1956)

No. 80, 87
- Position: Tight end

Personal information
- Born: April 30, 1956 (age 70); Sacramento, California, U.S.
- Listed height: 6 ft 2 in (1.88 m)
- Listed weight: 232 lb (105 kg)

Career information
- High school: Christian Brothers (Sacramento)
- College: Washington State
- NFL draft: 1978: 12th round, 312th overall pick

Career history
- St. Louis Cardinals (1978); San Francisco 49ers (1979–1983); Buffalo Bills (1985)

Awards and highlights
- Super Bowl champion (XVI)

Career NFL statistics
- Receptions: 104
- Receiving yards: 983
- Touchdowns: 5
- Stats at Pro Football Reference

Eason Ramson (born April 30, 1956) is an American former professional football player who was a tight end in the National Football League (NFL). He played college football for the Washington State Cougars. He played in the NFL for the St. Louis Cardinals, San Francisco 49ers, Denver Broncos and Buffalo Bills. He won Super Bowl XVI with the 49ers and was also the last player in the team's history to wear number 80 before Jerry Rice.

A Sports Illustrated Beta Vault article by Chuck Barney recounts Ramson turning his life around after bouts with cocaine and the California corrections department.

He is now a motivational speaker, and is listed as a 2009 director at the Bayview YMCA in the southeast corridor of San Francisco and a Director for the C.A.R.E. Program.
