= Lawrence Pillers =

American football player (born 1952)

No. 76, 65
- Position: Defensive end

Personal information
- Born: November 4, 1952 (age 74); Hazlehurst, Mississippi, U.S.
- Listed height: 6 ft 4 in (1.93 m)
- Listed weight: 255 lb (116 kg)

Career information
- High school: Hazelhurst
- College: Alcorn State
- NFL draft: 1976: 11th round, 296th overall pick

Career history
- New York Jets (1976–1980); San Francisco 49ers (1980–1984); Atlanta Falcons (1984–1985)

Awards and highlights
- 2× Super Bowl champion (XVI, XIX)

Career NFL statistics
- Sacks: 11
- Interception yards: 16
- Fumble recoveries: 8
- Games played: 139
- Games started: 99
- Stats at Pro Football Reference

Lawrence Pillers (born November 4, 1952) is an American former professional football player who was a defensive end for the New York Jets, San Francisco 49ers and Atlanta Falcons in a ten-year career that lasted from 1976 to 1985 in the National Football League (NFL).

Pillers played college football for the Alcorn State Braves and was selected in the 11th round of the 1976 NFL draft by the Jets. He was a member of the San Francisco 49ers' Super Bowl XVI and Super Bowl XIX winning teams.

Pillers made a game-saving play in the 1981 NFC Championship Game against the Dallas Cowboys. After Dwight Clark made "The Catch" to give the 49ers a 28–27 lead in the final minute, Dallas drove into 49ers territory trying to set up a game-winning field goal. Pillers sacked Danny White, forcing White to fumble, and the 49ers recovered to preserve the win.

In 2018 at age 65, Pillers graduated from Alcorn State University.
