= Willie Harper =

American football player (born 1950)

No. 59
- Position: Linebacker

Personal information
- Born: July 30, 1950 (age 76); Toledo, Ohio, U.S.
- Listed height: 6 ft 2 in (1.88 m)
- Listed weight: 215 lb (98 kg)

Career information
- High school: Scott (Toledo)
- College: Nebraska (1969–1972)
- NFL draft: 1973: 2nd round, 41st overall pick

Career history
- San Francisco 49ers (1973–1983); New Jersey Generals (1984); Houston Gamblers (1985)

Awards and highlights
- Super Bowl champion (XVI); 2× National champion (1970, 1971); 2× Consensus All-American (1971, 1972); 2× First-team All-Big Eight (1971, 1972); Second-team All-Big Eight (1970)

Career NFL statistics
- Sacks: 3
- Interception yards: 43
- Games: 134
- Games Played: 100
- Stats at Pro Football Reference

Willie Miles Harper (born July 30, 1950) is an American former professional football player who was a linebacker for the San Francisco 49ers of the National Football League (NFL). He played college football for the Nebraska Cornhuskers, twice earning consensus All-American honors. Harper won Super Bowl XVI with the 49ers during the 1981 season. He also played in the United States Football League (USFL).

Harper played high school football for Toledo Scott and attended the University of Nebraska–Lincoln, where he was an All-American in 1972 and was drafted in the second round of the 1973 NFL draft by the 49ers, who he stayed with for eleven years, from 1973 to 1983. He moved to the USFL in 1984 to play for the New Jersey Generals. He finished his career with the Houston Gamblers in 1985.

His son, Josh Harper, played college football at Fresno State University. His granddaughter is rapper Saweetie.
