= Ricky Patton =

American football player (born 1954)

No. 33, 30, 42, 32
- Position: Running back

Personal information
- Born: April 6, 1954 (age 72); Flint, Michigan, U.S.
- Listed height: 5 ft 11 in (1.80 m)
- Listed weight: 190 lb (86 kg)

Career information
- High school: Flint Southwestern Academy (Flint, Michigan)
- College: Ferris State (1973); Jackson State (1975–1977)
- NFL draft: 1978: 10th round, 258th overall pick

Career history
- Atlanta Falcons (1978–1979); Green Bay Packers (1979); San Francisco 49ers (1980–1982)

Awards and highlights
- Super Bowl champion (XVI)

Career NFL statistics
- Rushing yards: 885
- Rushing average: 3.4
- Rushing touchdowns: 5
- Stats at Pro Football Reference

Ricky Riccardo Patton (born April 6, 1954) is an American former professional football player who was a running back for five seasons in the National Football League (NFL) with the Atlanta Falcons, Green Bay Packers, and San Francisco 49ers. He played college football for one season with the Ferris State Bulldogs before dropping out; he then went on to play three more seasons for the Jackson State Tigers. He started in Super Bowl XVI for the 49ers.
