= Paul Hofer =

American football player (born 1952)

No. 36
- Position: Running back

Personal information
- Born: May 13, 1952 (age 74); Memphis, Tennessee, U.S.
- Listed height: 6 ft 0 in (1.83 m)
- Listed weight: 195 lb (88 kg)

Career information
- High school: Christian Brothers (TN); Tennessee Military Institute
- College: Ole Miss
- NFL draft: 1976: 11th round, 305th overall pick

Career history
- San Francisco 49ers (1976–1981)

Awards and highlights
- Super Bowl champion (XVI)

Career NFL statistics
- Rushing attempts: 416
- Rushing yards: 1,746
- Receptions: 147
- Receiving yards: 1,634
- Total TDs: 21
- Stats at Pro Football Reference

Paul David Hofer (born May 13, 1952) is an American former professional football player who was a running back for six seasons with the San Francisco 49ers of the National Football League (NFL). He played college football for the Ole Miss Rebels. He was a part of the 49ers' Super Bowl XVI—winning team.

Known for his hard and relentless running style, Hofer was a fan favorite despite being on poor 49ers teams in the mid to late 1970s. Hofer was a brutal, attacking runner who suffered serious knee injuries that ultimately shortened his career. Hofer saw limited duty during the 1981 season but was placed on injured reserve before season's end; he was unable to play in the playoffs or the Super Bowl. He retired soon thereafter.
