= 1985 San Francisco 49ers season =

American football team season

- Owner: Edward J. DeBartolo, Jr.
- General manager: John McVay and Carmen Policy
- Head coach: Bill Walsh
- Defensive coordinator: George Seifert
- Home stadium: Candlestick Park

Results
- Record: 10–6
- Division place: 2nd NFC West
- Playoffs: Lost Wild Card Playoffs (at Giants) 3–17
- All-Pros: 9: QB Joe Montana; RB Roger Craig; T Keith Fahnhorst; G Randy Cross; G John Ayers; C Fred Quillan; NT Michael Carter; LB Keena Turner; CB Eric Wright
- Pro Bowlers: 6: QB Joe Montana; RB Roger Craig; C Fred Quillan; NT Michael Carter; CB Eric Wright; SS Carlton Williamson

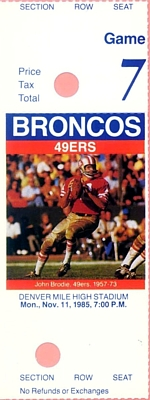
A ticket for a November 1985 game between the 49ers and the Denver Broncos.

The 1985 San Francisco 49ers season was the franchise's 36th season in the National Football League and their 40th overall.

49ers running back Roger Craig became the first player in NFL history to record both 1,000 rushing yards and 1,000 receiving yards in the same season. Craig rushed for 1,050 yards, and had 1,016 receiving yards.

This season was Jerry Rice's first season in the league.

== Offseason ==
=== NFL draft ===
1985 San Francisco 49ers draft
| Round | Pick | Player | Position | College | Notes |
| 1 | 16 | Jerry Rice * ^{†} | Wide receiver | Mississippi Valley State | |
| 3 | 75 | Ricky Moore | Running back | Alabama | |
| 5 | 140 | Bruce Collie | Guard | UT Arlington | |
| 6 | 168 | Scott Barry | Quarterback | UC Davis | |
| 11 | 308 | David Wood | Defensive end | Arizona | |
| 12 | 336 | Donald Chumley | Defensive tackle | Georgia | |
Made roster † Pro Football Hall of Fame * Made at least one Pro Bowl during career

== Personnel ==
=== Staff ===
1985 San Francisco 49ers staff
| Front office: Owner – Edward J. DeBartolo, Jr.; President – Bill Walsh; Vice President/General Counsel – Carmen Policy; Vice President/General Manager – John McVay; Director of College Scouting – Tony Razzano; Director of pro personnel – Allan Webb; Director of Research and Development – Neal Dahlen; Head coaches: Head coach – Bill Walsh; Offensive coaches: Quarterbacks/Receivers – Paul Hackett; Running Backs – Sherman Lewis; Offensive Line – Bobb McKittrick; Assistant Offensive Line/Tight Ends – Fred von Appen | Defensive coaches: Defensive coordinator – George Seifert; Defensive Line – Bill McPherson; Linebackers – Norb Hecker; Defensive Backs – Ray Rhodes; Defensive Assistant – Tommy Hart; Special teams coaches: Special Teams – Fred von Appen; Strength and conditioning: Physical Development Coordinator – Jerry Attaway |

=== Roster ===
1985 San Francisco 49ers roster
| Quarterbacks (QB): 6 Matt Cavanaugh; 16 Joe Montana; Running backs (RB): 24 Derrick Harmon; 26 Wendell Tyler; 30 Bill Ring; 32 Carl Monroe; 33 Roger Craig; Wide receivers (WR): 80 Jerry Rice; 85 Mike Wilson; 87 Dwight Clark; 88 Freddie Solomon; Tight ends (TE): 81 Russ Francis; 86 John Frank | Offensive linemen (OL): 52 John Hill C; 56 Fred Quillan C; 60 Vince Stroth G; 62 Guy McIntyre G; 68 John Ayers G; 69 Bruce Collie T/G; 71 Keith Fahnhorst T; 77 Bubba Paris T; Defensive linemen (DL): 72 Jeff Stover DE; 74 Fred Dean DE; 75 John Harty DE; 76 Dwaine Board DE; 78 Manu Tuiasosopo NT; 79 Jim Stuckey DE; 95 Michael Carter NT | Linebackers (LB): 50 Riki Ellison ILB; 53 Milt McColl OLB; 54 Ron Ferrari OLB; 55 Jim Fahnhorst ILB; 57 Jim Kovach ILB; 58 Keena Turner OLB; 90 Todd Shell OLB; 99 Michael Walter ILB; Defensive backs (DB): 20 Tory Nixon CB; 21 Eric Wright CB; 22 Dwight Hicks CB/FS; 27 Carlton Williamson SS; 42 Ronnie Lott FS/CB; 43 Dana McLemore CB; 49 Jeff Fuller SS; Special teams (ST): 4 Max Runager P; 14 Ray Wersching K | Reserve: 89 Earl Cooper TE (IR); 51 Randy Cross G/C (IR); 28 Tom Holmoe S (IR); 40 Charles Huff CB (IR); 97 Gary Johnson NT (IR); 66 Allan Kennedy T (IR); 59 Fulton Kuykendall LB (IR); 61 Jesse Sapolu G (IR); Rookies in italics |

== Preseason ==
| Week | Date | Opponent | Result | Record | Venue | Attendance |
|---|---|---|---|---|---|---|
| 1 | August 10 | at Los Angeles Raiders | W 28–21 | 1–0 | Los Angeles Memorial Coliseum | 61,784 |
| 2 | August 19 | Denver Broncos | L 13–20 | 1–1 | Candlestick Park | 55,425 |
| 3 | August 24 | San Diego Chargers | W 25–10 | 2–1 | Candlestick Park | 50,569 |
| 4 | August 30 | at Seattle Seahawks | W 23–21 | 3–1 | Kingdome | 60,403 |

== Regular season ==
| Week | Date | Opponent | Result | Record | Venue | Attendance |
|---|---|---|---|---|---|---|
| 1 | September 8 | at Minnesota Vikings | **L** 21–28 | 0–1 | Hubert H. Humphrey Metrodome | 57,375 |
| 2 | September 15 | **Atlanta Falcons** | **W** 35–16 | 1–1 | Candlestick Park | 58,923 |
| 3 | September 22 | at Los Angeles Raiders | **W** 34–10 | 2–1 | Los Angeles Memorial Coliseum | 87,006 |
| 4 | September 29 | **New Orleans Saints** | **L** 17–20 | 2–2 | Candlestick Park | 58,053 |
| 5 | October 6 | at **Atlanta Falcons** | **W** 38–17 | 3–2 | Atlanta–Fulton County Stadium | 44,740 |
| 6 | October 13 | Chicago Bears | **L** 10–26 | 3–3 | Candlestick Park | 60,523 |
| 7 | October 20 | at Detroit Lions | **L** 21–23 | 3–4 | Pontiac Silverdome | 67,715 |
| 8 | October 27 | at **Los Angeles Rams** | **W** 28–14 | 4–4 | Anaheim Stadium | 65,939 |
| 9 | November 3 | Philadelphia Eagles | **W** 24–13 | 5–4 | Candlestick Park | 58,383 |
| 10 | November 11 | at Denver Broncos | **L** 16–17 | 5–5 | Mile High Stadium | 73,173 |
| 11 | November 17 | Kansas City Chiefs | **W** 31–3 | 6–5 | Candlestick Park | 56,447 |
| 12 | November 25 | Seattle Seahawks | **W** 19–6 | 7–5 | Candlestick Park | 57,482 |
| 13 | December 1 | at Washington Redskins | **W** 35–8 | 8–5 | RFK Stadium | 51,321 |
| 14 | December 9 | **Los Angeles Rams** | **L** 20–27 | 8–6 | Candlestick Park | 60,581 |
| 15 | December 15 | at **New Orleans Saints** | **W** 31–19 | 9–6 | Louisiana Superdome | 46,065 |
| 16 | December 22 | Dallas Cowboys | **W** 31–16 | 10–6 | Candlestick Park | 60,114 |
Note: Intra-division opponents are in **bold** text.

=== Game summaries ===
==== Week 15: at New Orleans Saints ====
| Team | 1 | 2 | 3 | 4 | Total |
|---|---|---|---|---|---|
| • 49ers | 0 | 7 | 10 | 14 | 31 |
| Saints | 0 | 9 | 7 | 3 | 19 |

- Date: December 15
- Location: Louisiana Superdome, New Orleans, LA
- Game start: 1:00 p.m. EST
- Game attendance: 46,065
- Game weather: Indoors (dome)
- Referee: Ben Dreith

Scoring summary
| Q2 | SF | Clark 26 yard pass from Montana (Wersching kick) | SF 7–0 |
| Q2 | NO | Andersen 46 yard field goal | SF 7–3 |
| Q2 | NO | Warren 42 yard blocked field goal return (kick failed) | NO 9–7 |
| Q3 | SF | Wilson 52 yard pass from Montana (Wersching kick) | SF 14–9 |
| Q3 | NO | Goodlow 76 yard pass from Hebert (Andersen kick) | NO 16–14 |
| Q3 | SF | Wersching 24 yard field goal | SF 17–16 |
| Q4 | NO | Andersen 41 yard field goal | NO 19–17 |
| Q4 | SF | Francis 17 yard pass from Montana (Wersching kick) | SF 24–19 |
| Q4 | SF | Craig 15 yard run (Wersching kick) | SF 31–19 |

- Joe Montana 25/38, 354 Yds

=== Standings ===
NFC West
| | W | L | T | PCT | DIV | CONF | PF | PA | STK |
|---|---|---|---|---|---|---|---|---|---|
| Los Angeles Rams^{(2)} | 11 | 5 | 0 | .688 | 3–3 | 8–4 | 340 | 277 | L1 |
| San Francisco 49ers^{(5)} | 10 | 6 | 0 | .625 | 4–2 | 7–5 | 411 | 263 | W2 |
| New Orleans Saints | 5 | 11 | 0 | .313 | 2–4 | 5–7 | 294 | 401 | L3 |
| Atlanta Falcons | 4 | 12 | 0 | .250 | 3–3 | 4–8 | 282 | 452 | W2 |

== Postseason ==
=== Schedule ===
| Round | Date | Opponent (seed) | Result | Record | Venue |
|---|---|---|---|---|---|
| Wild Card | December 29 | at New York Giants (4) | L 3–17 | 0–1 | Giants Stadium |

=== Game summaries ===
==== NFC Wild Card Playoff: at (4) New York Giants ====
| Team | 1 | 2 | 3 | 4 | Total |
|---|---|---|---|---|---|
| 49ers | 0 | 3 | 0 | 0 | 3 |
| • Giants | 3 | 7 | 7 | 0 | 17 |

- Date: December 29
- Location: Giants Stadium, East Rutherford, New Jersey
- Game start: 1:00 p.m.
- Game attendance: 75,842
- Game weather: Mostly cloudy; 36 °F or 2.2 °C; wind 16 miles per hour (26 km/h; 14 kn)
- Referee: Red Cashion
- TV announcers (CBS): Pat Summerall and John Madden

== Awards and records ==
- Roger Craig, Led NFL, Receptions, 92 receptions

=== Milestones ===
- Roger Craig, 1,000 yards rushing and 1,000 yards receiving in the same season
