= 1986 San Francisco 49ers season =

American football team season

- Owner: Edward J. DeBartolo Jr.
- General manager: John McVay
- Head coach: Bill Walsh
- Defensive coordinator: George Seifert
- Home stadium: Candlestick Park

Results
- Record: 10–5–1
- Division place: 1st NFC West
- Playoffs: Lost Divisional Playoffs (at Giants) 3–49
- Pro Bowlers: WR Jerry Rice; FS Ronnie Lott

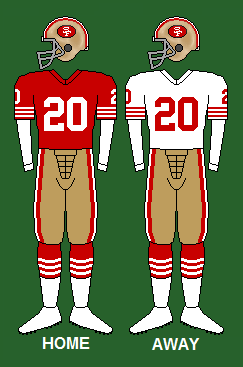
Uniform of the San Francisco 49ers from the years 1984-1988

The 1986 San Francisco 49ers season was the franchise's 37th season in the National Football League and their 41st overall. The team returned to the top of the NFC West after a one-year absence and lost in the divisional playoffs to the Giants by a score of 49–3, the biggest playoff loss suffered by the 49ers in the history of their franchise. This was the first of five consecutive NFC West titles for the 49ers.

Joe Montana suffered a back injury in Week 1 and was lost for two months after surgery. Because the injury was so severe, Montana's doctors suggested that Montana retire. However, Montana returned for Week 10 against the St. Louis Cardinals, where he passed for 270 yards and three touchdown passes in a 43–17 49er victory. Montana appeared in just eight games this season, and threw more interceptions than touchdown passes for the only time in his career. Montana shared Comeback Player of the Year honors with Minnesota's Tommy Kramer at the end of the season.

== Offseason ==
=== NFL draft ===
1986 San Francisco 49ers draft
Round	Pick	Player	Position	College	Notes
2	39	Larry Roberts	Defensive end	Alabama	
3	56	Tom Rathman	Running back	Nebraska	
3	64	Tim McKyer	Defensive back	UT Arlington	
3	76	John Taylor *	Wide receiver	Delaware State	began play with 49ers in 1987.
4	96	Charles Haley * ^{†}	Defensive end	James Madison	
4	101	Steve Wallace *	Tackle	Auburn	
4	102	Kevin Fagan	Defensive end	Miami (FL)	began play with 49ers in 1987.
5	131	Patrick Miller	Linebacker	Florida	
6	162	Don Griffin	Defensive back	Middle Tennessee	
8	203	Jim Popp	Tight end	Vanderbilt	
9	240	Tony Cherry	Running back	Oregon	
10	267	Elliston Stinson	Wide receiver	Rice	
10	270	Harold Hallman	Linebacker	Auburn	
Made roster † Pro Football Hall of Fame * Made at least one Pro Bowl during career

== Personnel ==
=== Staff ===
1986 San Francisco 49ers staff
Front office: Owner – Edward J. DeBartolo, Jr.; President – Bill Walsh; Vice President/General Counsel – Carmen Policy; Vice President/General Manager – John McVay; Administrator of Football Operations – Neal Dahlen; Director of College Scouting – Tony Razzano; Director of Pro Personnel – Allan Webb; Head coaches: Head Coach – Bill Walsh; Offensive coaches: Quarterbacks – Mike Holmgren; Running Backs – Sherman Lewis; Receivers – Dennis Green; Offensive Line – Bobb McKittrick; Assistant Offensive Line/Tight Ends – Fred von Appen	Defensive coaches: Defensive Coordinator – George Seifert; Defensive Line – Bill McPherson; Linebackers – Norb Hecker; Defensive Backs – Ray Rhodes; Defensive Assistant – Tommy Hart; Special teams coaches: Special Teams – Fred von Appen; Strength and conditioning: Physical Development Coordinator – Jerry Attaway

=== Roster ===
1986 San Francisco 49ers roster
Quarterbacks (QB): 9 Jeff Kemp; 16 Joe Montana; 15 Mike Moroski; Running backs (RB): 33 Roger Craig; 28 Joe Cribbs; 44 Tom Rathman; 30 Bill Ring; 26 Wendell Tyler; Wide receivers (WR): 87 Dwight Clark; 83 Derrick Crawford; 84 Ken Margerum; 80 Jerry Rice; Tight ends (TE): 81 Russ Francis; 86 John Frank	Offensive linemen (OL): 68 John Ayers G; 69 Bruce Collie T/G; 51 Randy Cross G/C; 64 Mike Durrette G; 71 Keith Fahnhorst T; 62 Guy McIntyre G; 77 Bubba Paris T; 56 Fred Quillan C; 74 Steve Wallace T; Defensive linemen (DL): 76 Dwaine Board DE; 95 Michael Carter NT; 91 Larry Roberts DE; 65 Doug Rogers DE; 72 Jeff Stover DE; 78 Manu Tuiasosopo NT	Linebackers (LB): 50 Riki Ellison ILB; 55 Jim Fahnhorst ILB; 54 Ron Ferrari OLB; 94 Charles Haley OLB; 53 Milt McColl OLB; 58 Keena Turner OLB; 99 Michael Walter ILB; Defensive backs (DB): 49 Jeff Fuller SS; 29 Don Griffin CB; 46 Tom Holmoe FS; 42 Ronnie Lott FS; 22 Tim McKyer CB; 20 Tory Nixon CB; 27 Carlton Williamson SS; Special teams (ST): 4 Max Runager P; 14 Ray Wersching K	Reserve: 57 Tom Cousineau LB (IR); 75 Kevin Fagan DE (NF-Inj.); 24 Derrick Harmon RB (IR); 75 John Harty DE (IR); 89 Ron Heller TE (IR); 67 Pete Kugler NT (IR); 32 Carl Monroe RB (IR); 25 Jimmy Rogers RB (IR); 61 Jesse Sapolu G (IR); 90 Todd Shell LB (IR); 82 John Taylor WR (IR); 85 Mike Wilson WR (IR); 21 Eric Wright CB (IR); Rookies in italics

== Preseason ==
Week	Date	Opponent	Result	Record	Venue
1	August 10	Los Angeles Raiders	W 32–0	1–0	Candlestick Park
2	August 18	at Los Angeles Rams	L 17–31	1–1	Anaheim Stadium
3	August 23	at Denver Broncos	L 9–14	1–2	Mile High Stadium
4	August 29	Seattle Seahawks	W 21–10	2–2	Candlestick Park

== Regular season ==
=== Schedule ===
Week	Date	Opponent	Result	Record	Venue	Attendance
1	September 7	at Tampa Bay Buccaneers	**W** 31–7	1–0	Tampa Stadium	50,780
2	September 14	at **Los Angeles Rams**	**L** 13–16	1–1	Anaheim Stadium	65,195
3	September 21	**New Orleans Saints**	**W** 26–17	2–1	Candlestick Park	58,297
4	September 28	at Miami Dolphins	**W** 31–16	3–1	Miami Orange Bowl	70,264
5	October 5	Indianapolis Colts	**W** 35–15	4–1	Candlestick Park	57,252
6	October 12	Minnesota Vikings	**L** 24–27 (OT)	4–2	Candlestick Park	58,637
7	October 19	at **Atlanta Falcons**	**T** 10–10 (OT)	4–2–1	Atlanta–Fulton County Stadium	55,306
8	October 26	at Green Bay Packers	**W** 31–17	5–2–1	Milwaukee County Stadium	50,557
9	November 2	at **New Orleans Saints**	**L** 10–23	5–3–1	Louisiana Superdome	53,234
10	November 9	St. Louis Cardinals	**W** 43–17	6–3–1	Candlestick Park	59,172
11	November 17	at Washington Redskins	**L** 6–14	6–4–1	RFK Stadium	54,774
12	November 23	**Atlanta Falcons**	**W** 20–0	7–4–1	Candlestick Park	58,747
13	December 1	New York Giants	**L** 17–21	7–5–1	Candlestick Park	59,777
14	December 7	New York Jets	**W** 24–10	8–5–1	Candlestick Park	58,091
15	December 14	at New England Patriots	**W** 29–24	9–5–1	Sullivan Stadium	60,787
16	December 19	**Los Angeles Rams**	**W** 24–14	10–5–1	Candlestick Park	60,366
Note: Intra-division opponents are in **bold** text.

=== Standings ===
NFC West
	W	L	T	PCT	DIV	CONF	PF	PA	STK
San Francisco 49ers^{(3)}	10	5	1	.656	3–2–1	6–5–1	374	247	W3
Los Angeles Rams^{(5)}	10	6	0	.625	3–3	8–4	309	267	L2
Atlanta Falcons	7	8	1	.469	2–3–1	6–5–1	280	280	W1
New Orleans Saints	7	9	0	.438	3–3	6–6	288	287	L1

== Postseason ==
=== Schedule ===
Round	Date	Opponent (seed)	Result	Record	Venue
Divisional	January 4	New York Giants (1)	L 3–49	0–1	Giants Stadium

=== Game summaries ===
==== 1986 NFC Divisional Playoff: San Francisco 49ers vs. New York Giants ====
- San Francisco 49ers 3, New York Giants 49

January 4, 1987, at Giants Stadium, East Rutherford, New Jersey
Attendance: 76,034

== Awards and records ==
- Ronnie Lott, Franchise Record, Most Interceptions in One Season, 10 interceptions
- Joe Montana, NFL Co-Comeback Player of the Year
- Jerry Rice, Led NFC, Receptions, 86 receptions
- Jerry Rice, led NFL with 1,570 receiving yards
- Jerry Rice, led NFL with 15 touchdowns.
