= List of San Francisco 49ers starting quarterbacks =

These quarterbacks have started at least one game for the San Francisco 49ers of the National Football League.

The early era of the NFL and American football in general was not conducive to passing the football, with the forward pass not being legalized until the early 1900s and not fully adopted for many more years. Although the quarterback position has historically been the one to receive the snap and thus handle the football on every offensive play, the importance of the position during this era was limited by various rules, like having to be five yards behind the line of scrimmage before a forward pass could be attempted. These rules and the tactical focus on rushing the ball limited the importance of the quarterback position while enhancing the value of different types of backs, such as the halfback and the fullback. Some of these backs were considered triple-threat men, capable of rushing, passing or kicking the football, making it common for multiple players to attempt a pass during a game.

As rules changed and the NFL began adopting a more pass-centric approach to offensive football, the importance of the quarterback position grew. Beginning in 1950, total wins and losses by a team's starting quarterback were tracked. Prior to 1950, the combination of unreliable statistics in the early era of the NFL and the differences in the early quarterback position make tracking starts by quarterbacks impractical for this timeframe.

== Starting quarterbacks ==
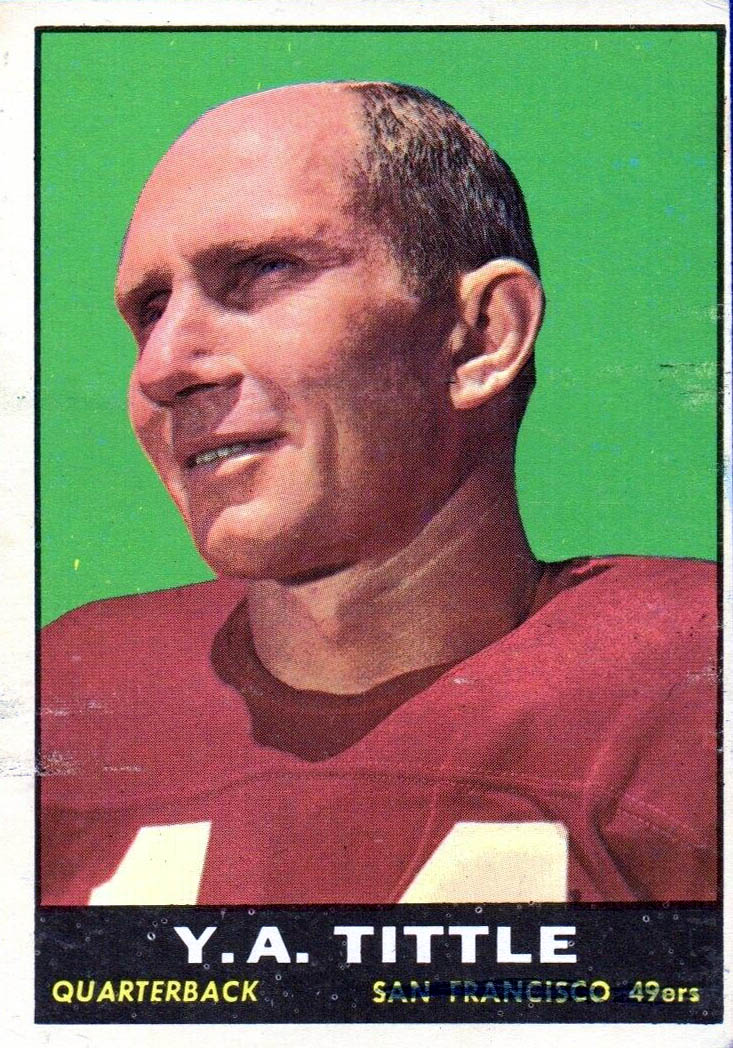
Y. A. Tittle (1951–1960)

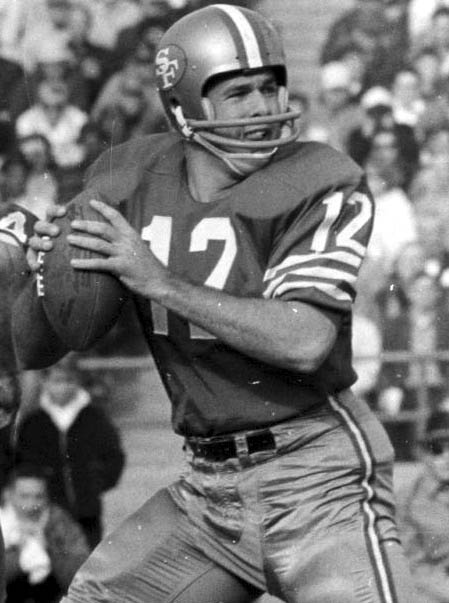
John Brodie (1957–1973)

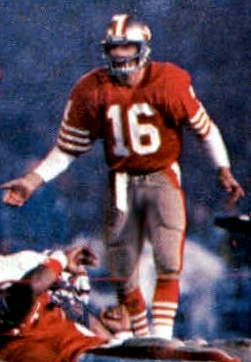
Joe Montana (1979–1990)

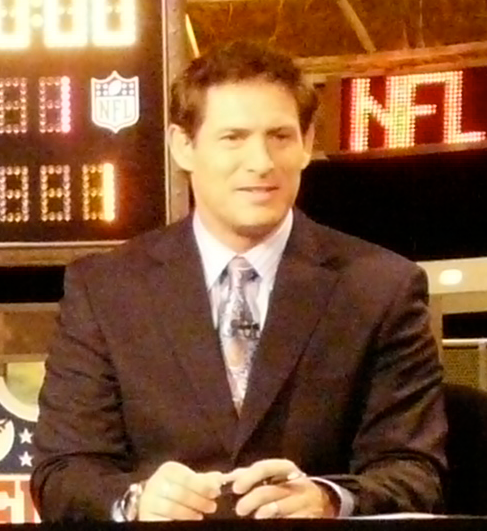
Steve Young (1987–1999)

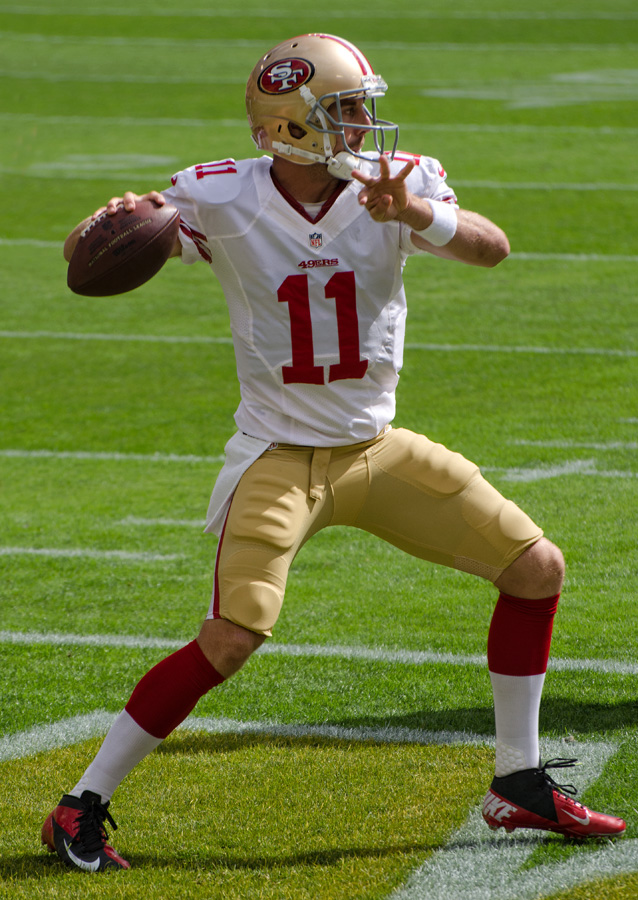
Alex Smith (2005–2007, 2009–2012)

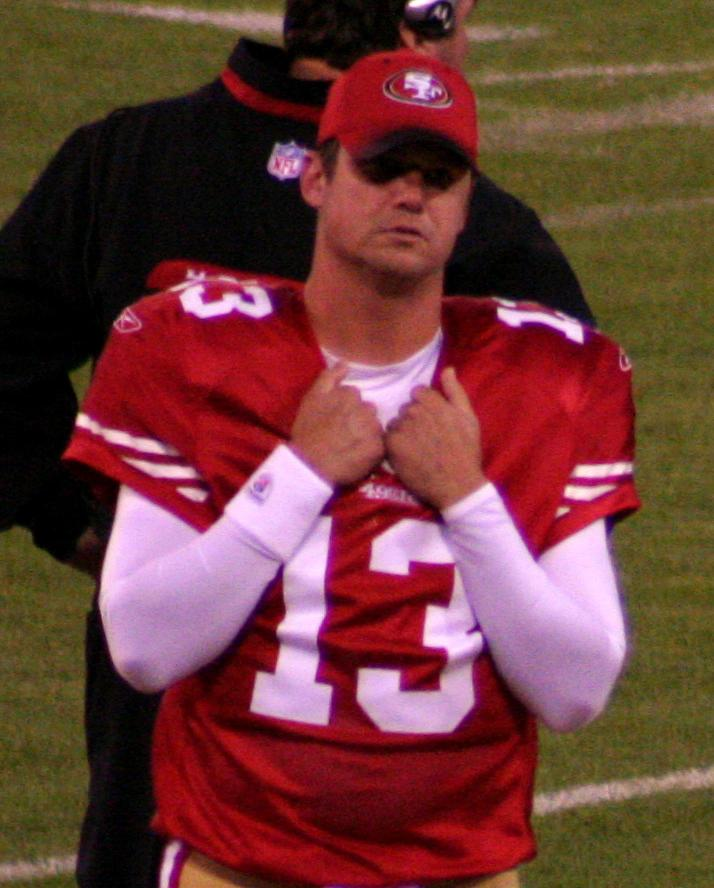
Shaun Hill (2007–2009)

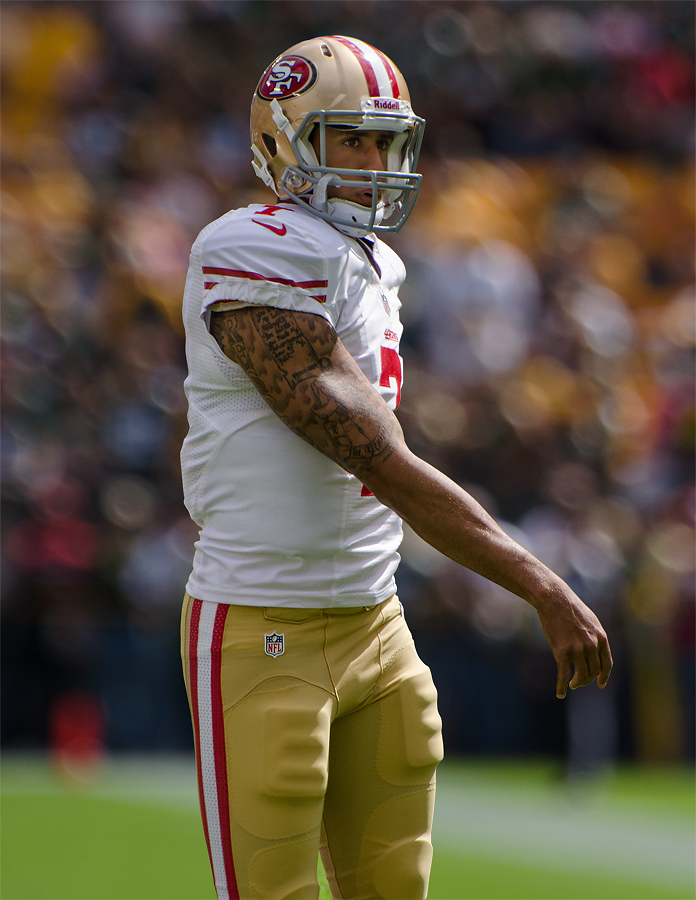
Colin Kaepernick (2012–2016)

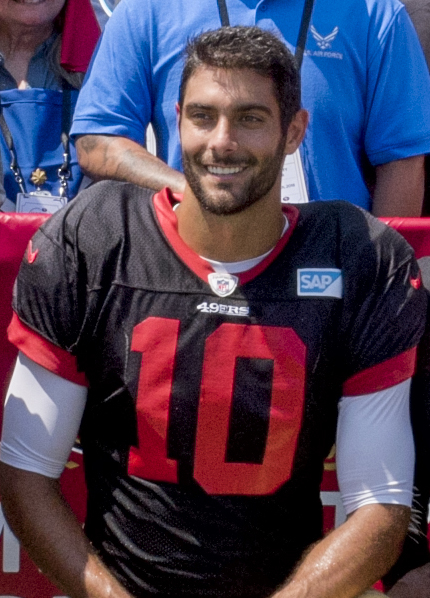
Jimmy Garoppolo (2017–2022)

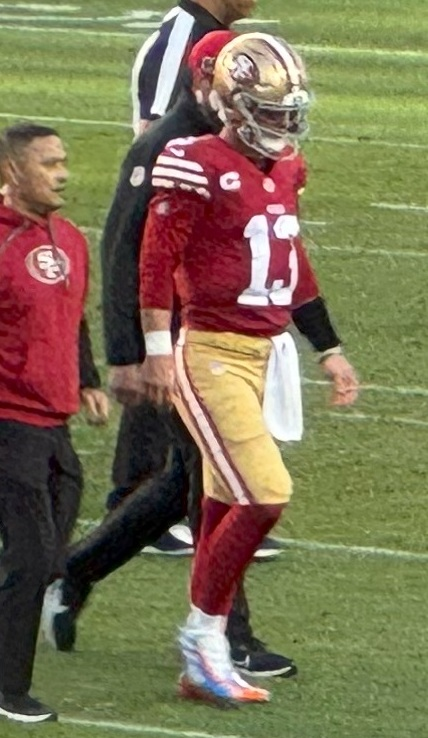
Brock Purdy (2023–present)

The number of games they started during the season is listed to the right in parentheses.

=== Regular season ===
Season(s)	Quarterback(s)
1950	Frankie Albert (12)
1951	Frankie Albert (11) / Y. A. Tittle (1)
1952	Frankie Albert (7) / Y. A. Tittle (5)
1953	Y. A. Tittle (10) / Jim Powers (2)
1954	Y. A. Tittle (11) / Jim Cason (1)
1955	Y. A. Tittle (12)
1956	Y. A. Tittle (8) / Earl Morrall (4)
1957	Y. A. Tittle (11) / John Brodie (1)
1958	Y. A. Tittle (6) / John Brodie (6)
1959	Y. A. Tittle (10) / John Brodie (2)
1960	John Brodie (8) / Y. A. Tittle (4)
1961	John Brodie (14)
1962	John Brodie (14)
1963	Lamar McHan (9) / John Brodie (3) / Bob Waters (2)
1964	John Brodie (12) / George Mira (2)
1965	John Brodie (13) / George Mira (1)
1966	John Brodie (13) / George Mira (1)
1967	John Brodie (10) / George Mira (2) / Steve Spurrier (2)
1968	John Brodie (14)
1969	John Brodie (10) / Steve Spurrier (4)
1970	John Brodie (14)
1971	John Brodie (14)
1972	Steve Spurrier (9) / John Brodie (5)
1973	John Brodie (6) / Steve Spurrier (5) / Joe Reed (3)
1974	Tom Owen (7) / Joe Reed (4) / Dennis Morrison (2) / Norm Snead (1)
1975	Norm Snead (7) / Steve Spurrier (6) / Tom Owen (1)
1976	Jim Plunkett (12) / Scott Bull (2)
1977	Jim Plunkett (14)
1978	Steve DeBerg (11) / Scott Bull (5)
1979	Steve DeBerg (15) / Joe Montana (1)
1980	Steve DeBerg (9) / Joe Montana (7)
1981	Joe Montana (16)
1982	Joe Montana (9)
1983	Joe Montana (16)
1984	Joe Montana (15) / Matt Cavanaugh (1)
1985	Joe Montana (15) / Matt Cavanaugh (1)
1986	Joe Montana (8) / Jeff Kemp (6) / Mike Moroski (2)
1987	Joe Montana (11) / Steve Young (3) / Bob Gagliano (1)
1988	Joe Montana (13) / Steve Young (3)
1989	Joe Montana (13) / Steve Young (3)
1990	Joe Montana (15) / Steve Young (1)
1991	Steve Young (10) / Steve Bono (6)
1992	Steve Young (16)
1993	Steve Young (16)
1994	Steve Young (16)
1995	Steve Young (11) / Elvis Grbac (5)
1996	Steve Young (12) / Elvis Grbac (4)
1997	Steve Young (15) / Jim Druckenmiller (1)
1998	Steve Young (15) / Ty Detmer (1)
1999	Jeff Garcia (10) / Steve Stenstrom (3) / Steve Young (3)
2000	Jeff Garcia (16)
2001	Jeff Garcia (16)
2002	Jeff Garcia (16)
2003	Jeff Garcia (13) / Tim Rattay (3)
2004	Tim Rattay (9) / Ken Dorsey (7)
2005	Alex Smith (7) / Tim Rattay (4) / Ken Dorsey (3) / Cody Pickett (2)
2006	Alex Smith (16)
2007	Alex Smith (7) / Trent Dilfer (6) / Shaun Hill (2) / Chris Weinke (1)
2008	Shaun Hill (8) / J. T. O'Sullivan (8)
2009	Alex Smith (10) / Shaun Hill (6)
2010	Alex Smith (10) / Troy Smith (6)
2011	Alex Smith (16)
2012	Alex Smith (9) / Colin Kaepernick (7)
2013	Colin Kaepernick (16)
2014	Colin Kaepernick (16)
2015	Colin Kaepernick (8) / Blaine Gabbert (8)
2016	Colin Kaepernick (11) / Blaine Gabbert (5)
2017	Brian Hoyer (6) / C. J. Beathard (5) / Jimmy Garoppolo (5)
2018	Nick Mullens (8) / C. J. Beathard (5) / Jimmy Garoppolo (3)
2019	Jimmy Garoppolo (16)
2020	Nick Mullens (8) / Jimmy Garoppolo (6) / C. J. Beathard (2)
2021	Jimmy Garoppolo (15) / Trey Lance (2)
2022	Jimmy Garoppolo (10) / Brock Purdy (5) / Trey Lance (2)
2023	Brock Purdy (16) / Sam Darnold (1)
2024	Brock Purdy (15) / Brandon Allen (1) / Joshua Dobbs (1)
2025	Brock Purdy (9) / Mac Jones (8)
2026	Brock Purdy (2)

1982 NFL season was shorted to 9 games due to a 57-day player strike

=== Postseason ===
In the NFL era (since 1950 season)

Season	Quarterback(s)
1957	Y. A. Tittle (0–1)
1970	John Brodie (1–1)
1971	John Brodie (1–1)
1972	John Brodie (0–1)
1981	Joe Montana (3–0)
1983	Joe Montana (1–1)
1984	Joe Montana (3–0)
1985	Joe Montana (0–1)
1986	Joe Montana (0–1)
1987	Joe Montana (0–1)
1988	Joe Montana (3–0)
1989	Joe Montana (3–0)
1990	Joe Montana (1–1)
1992	Steve Young (1–1)
1993	Steve Young (1–1)
1994	Steve Young (3–0)
1995	Steve Young (0–1)
1996	Steve Young (1–1)
1997	Steve Young (1–1)
1998	Steve Young (1–1)
2001	Jeff Garcia (0–1)
2002	Jeff Garcia (1–1)
2011	Alex Smith (1–1)
2012	Colin Kaepernick (2–1)
2013	Colin Kaepernick (2–1)
2019	Jimmy Garoppolo (2–1)
2021	Jimmy Garoppolo (2–1)
2022	Brock Purdy (2–1)
2023	Brock Purdy (2–1)
2025	Brock Purdy (1–1)

== Most games as starting quarterback ==
These quarterbacks have the most starts for the 49ers in regular season games in the NFL era (since 1950 season).

Name	
GP	Games played
GS	Games started
W	Number of wins as starting quarterback
L	Number of losses as starting quarterback
T	Number of ties as starting quarterback
Pct	Winning percentage as starting quarterback

Name	Period	GP	GS	W	L	T	%
John Brodie	1957–1973	201	159	74	77	8	.491
Joe Montana	1979–1992	168	140	101	39	—	.721
Steve Young	1987–1999	150	124	91	33	—	.734
Y. A. Tittle	1951–1960	112	79	46	31	2	.595
Alex Smith	2005–2012	80	75	38	36	1	.513
Jeff Garcia	1999–2003	74	71	35	36	—	.493
Colin Kaepernick	2011–2016	69	58	28	30	—	.483
Jimmy Garoppolo	2017–2022	57	55	38	17	—	.691
Brock Purdy	2022–2026	51	47	32	15	—	.681

== Team career passing records ==
In the NFL era (since 1950 season)

Name	Comp	Att	%	Yds	TD	Int
Joe Montana	2,929	4,600	63.7	35,124	244	123
John Brodie	2,469	4,491	55.0	31,548	214	224
Steve Young	2,400	3,648	65.8	29,907	221	86
Jeff Garcia	1,449	2,360	61.4	16,408	113	56
Alex Smith	1,290	2,177	59.3	14,280	81	63
Y. A. Tittle	1,226	2,194	55.9	16,016	108	134
Jimmy Garoppolo	1,104	1,632	67.6	13,599	82	42
Colin Kaepernick	1,011	1,692	59.8	12,271	72	30
Brock Purdy	964	1,409	68.4	12,177	89	38
Frankie Albert	831	1,564	53.1	10,795	115	98

== See also ==
- Lists of NFL starting quarterbacks
