= 1982 San Francisco 49ers season =

American football team season

- Owner: Edward J. DeBartolo, Jr.
- General manager: Bill Walsh
- Head coach: Bill Walsh
- Defensive coordinator: Chuck Studley
- Home stadium: Candlestick Park

Results
- Record: 3–6
- Division place: 11th NFC (Would have been 3rd in the NFC West)
- Playoffs: Did not qualify
- Pro Bowlers: G Randy Cross; WR Dwight Clark; CB Ronnie Lott; FS Dwight Hicks

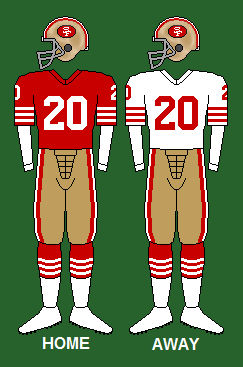
The uniform of the San Francisco 49ers, 1976-1983.

The 1982 San Francisco 49ers season was the franchise's 33rd season in the National Football League and their 37th overall. The team was coming off a Super Bowl victory over the Cincinnati Bengals. However, 1982 was strike-shortened, and only nine games were played. The 49ers finished 3–6, thus missing the playoffs despite the expanded sixteen team format. Their .333 winning percentage was the worst ever for any defending NFL or AFL champion until the 2022 Los Angeles Rams, who only managed to get a .294 winning percentage. This season was the only one in an 18-season span in which the 49ers did not win at least ten games. This 49ers team was also the only team in history to win more than half its road games while losing all its home games. The 49ers were the fifth team in NFL history to enter a season as the defending Super Bowl champion and miss the playoffs. This also marked the first, and as of 2023, only time in NFL history that the defending Super Bowl champion missed the playoffs for the third year in a row.

The worst running game in the league alongside a defense that went from second overall and points in 1981 to twenty-first and twenty-third respectively were the main culprits for the losing season.

== Offseason ==
=== NFL draft ===
1982 San Francisco 49ers draft
| Round | Pick | Player | Position | College | Notes |
| 2 | 29 | Bubba Paris | Tackle | Michigan | began play with 49ers in 1983 |
| 5 | 139 | Newton Williams | Running back | Arizona State | |
| 6 | 151 | Vince Williams | Running back | Oregon | |
| 7 | 195 | Ron Ferrari | Linebacker | Illinois | |
| 9 | 251 | Bryan Clark | Quarterback | Michigan State | |
| 10 | 269 | Dana McLemore | Defensive back | Hawaii | |
| 10 | 279 | Tim Barbian | Defensive tackle | Western Illinois | |
| 11 | 306 | Gary Gibson | Linebacker | Arizona | |
| 12 | 334 | Tim Washington | Defensive back | Fresno State | |
Made roster

== Personnel ==
=== Staff / Coaches ===
1982 San Francisco 49ers staff
| Front office: Owner and President – Edward J. DeBartolo, Jr.; General manager – Bill Walsh; Director of Football Operations – John McVay; Director of College Scouting – Tony Razzano; Head coaches: Head coach – Bill Walsh; Offensive coaches: Quarterbacks – Sam Wyche; Running Backs – Billie Matthews; Receivers – Milt Jackson; Offensive line – Bobb McKittrick | Defensive coaches: Defensive coordinator – Chuck Studley; Defensive line – Bill McPherson; Linebackers – Norb Hecker; Defensive Backs – George Seifert; Assistant Defensive Backs – Ray Rhodes; Special teams coaches: Special teams – Milt Jackson; Strength and conditioning: Strength and Conditioning – Al Vermeil |

=== Roster ===
1982 San Francisco 49ers roster
| Quarterbacks (QB): 7 Guy Benjamin; 15 Bryan Clark; 16 Joe Montana; Running backs (RB): 49 Earl Cooper; 20 Amos Lawrence; 25 Jeff Moore; 32 Ricky Patton; 30 Bill Ring; Wide receivers (WR): 87 Dwight Clark; 83 Renaldo Nehemiah; 88 Freddie Solomon; 85 Mike Wilson; Tight ends (TE): 81 Russ Francis; 80 Eason Ramson; 86 Charle Young | Offensive linemen (OL): 61 Dan Audick T; 68 John Ayers G; 60 John Choma G/C; 51 Randy Cross G; 62 Walt Downing G; 71 Keith Fahnhorst T; 78 Lindsey Mason T; 56 Fred Quillan C; Defensive linemen (DL): 90 Mike Clark DE; 74 Fred Dean DE; 75 John Harty NT/DE; 67 Pete Kugler NT; 65 Lawrence Pillers DE; 72 Jeff Stover DE; 79 Jim Stuckey DE | Linebackers (LB): 63 Terry Beeson ILB; 54 Ron Ferrari ILB; 59 Willie Harper OLB; 55 Bob Horn ILB; 50 Ed Judie OLB; 52 Bobby Leopold OLB; 53 Milt McColl OLB; 64 Jack Reynolds ILB; 58 Keena Turner OLB; Defensive backs (DB): 47 Tim Collier CB; 24 Rick Gervais SS; 22 Dwight Hicks FS; 42 Ronnie Lott CB; 43 Dana McLemore CB; 28 Lynn Thomas CB; 27 Carlton Williamson SS; 21 Eric Wright CB; Special teams (ST): 3 Jim Miller P; 14 Ray Wersching K | Reserve: 76 Dwaine Board DE (IR); -- Ken Bungarda T (IR); 57 Dan Bunz LB (IR); 66 Allan Kennedy T (IR); 77 Bubba Paris T (IR); 45 Newton Williams RB (IR); 40 Vince Williams RB (IR); Rookies in italics |

== Preseason ==
| Week | Date | Opponent | Result | Record | Venue | Attendance |
|---|---|---|---|---|---|---|
| 1 | August 14 | Los Angeles Raiders | L 14–17 | 0–1 | Candlestick Park | 61,065 |
| 2 | August 21 | St. Louis Cardinals | W 16–13 | 1–1 | Candlestick Park | 51,931 |
| 3 | August 28 | at San Diego Chargers | L 9–23 | 1–2 | Jack Murphy Stadium | 48,697 |
| 4 | September 3 | at Seattle Seahawks | W 17–13 | 2–2 | Kingdome | 57,839 |

== Regular season ==
=== Schedule ===
| Week | Date | Opponent | Result | Record | Venue | Attendance |
|---|---|---|---|---|---|---|
| 1 | September 12 | Los Angeles Raiders | **L** 17–23 | 0–1 | Candlestick Park | 59,748 |
| 2 | September 19 | at Denver Broncos | **L** 21–24 | 0–2 | Mile High Stadium | 73,899 |
| | September 26 | Chicago Bears | **Cancelled due to the 1982 NFL strike** | | | |
| | October 4 | at Tampa Bay Buccaneers | **Cancelled due to the 1982 NFL strike** | | | |
| | October 10 | at New Orleans Saints | **Cancelled due to the 1982 NFL strike** | | | |
| | October 17 | Los Angeles Rams | Rescheduled to January 2 | | | |
| | October 24 | at Atlanta Falcons | **Cancelled due to the 1982 NFL strike** | | | |
| | October 31 | at Washington Redskins | **Cancelled due to the 1982 NFL strike** | | | |
| | November 7 | Minnesota Vikings | **Cancelled due to the 1982 NFL strike** | | | |
| | November 14 | Dallas Cowboys | **Cancelled due to the 1982 NFL strike** | | | |
| 3 | November 21 | at St. Louis Cardinals | **W** 31–20 | 1–2 | Busch Memorial Stadium | 38,064 |
| 4 | November 28 | **New Orleans Saints** | **L** 20–23 | 1–3 | Candlestick Park | 51,611 |
| 5 | December 2 | at **Los Angeles Rams** | **W** 30–24 | 2–3 | Anaheim Stadium | 58,574 |
| 6 | December 11 | San Diego Chargers | **L** 37–41 | 2–4 | Candlestick Park | 55,988 |
| 7 | December 19 | **Atlanta Falcons** | **L** 7–17 | 2–5 | Candlestick Park | 53,234 |
| 8 | December 26 | at Kansas City Chiefs | **W** 26–13 | 3–5 | Arrowhead Stadium | 24,319 |
| 9 | January 2, 1983 | **Los Angeles Rams** | **L** 20–21 | 3–6 | Candlestick Park | 54,256 |
Note: Intra-division opponents are in **bold** text.

=== Game summaries ===
==== Week 1: vs. Los Angeles Raiders ====
Week One: Los Angeles Raiders (0–0) at San Francisco 49ers (0–0)

| Quarter | 1 | 2 | 3 | 4 | Total |
|---|---|---|---|---|---|
| **Raiders** | 3 | 10 | 0 | 10 | **23** |
| 49ers | 0 | 14 | 3 | 0 | **17** |

at Candlestick Park, San Francisco, California

- Date: September 12, 1982
- Game time: 4:00 p.m. EST
- Game weather: 65 °F or 18.3 °C
- Game attendance: 59,748
- Pro-Football-Reference.com

Game information

**First quarter**

- LA – Chris Bahr 41-yard field goal. Raiders 3–0. Drive:

**Second quarter**

- SF – Freddie Solomon 18-yard pass from Joe Montana (Ray Wersching kick). 49ers 7–3. Drive:
- LA – Chris Bahr 42-yard field goal. 49ers 7–6. Drive:
- SF – Dwight Clark 41-yard pass from Joe Montana (Ray Wersching kick). 49ers 14–6. Drive:
- LA – Marcus Allen 3-yard run (Chris Bahr kick). 49ers 14–13. Drive:

**Third quarter**

- SF – Ray Wersching 22 yard field goal. 49ers 17–13. Drive:

**Fourth quarter**

- LA – Todd Christensen 3-yard pass from Jim Plunkett (Chris Bahr kick). Raiders 20–17. Drive:
- LA – Chris Bahr 43-yard field goal. 'Raiders 23–17. Drive:

Top passers

- LA – Jim Plunkett – 12/20, 123 yards, TD, 2 INT
- SF – Joe Montana – 21/41, 244 yards, 2 TD, INT

Top rushers

- LA – Marcus Allen – 23 rushes, 116 yards, TD
- SF – Jeff Moore – 7 rushes, 30 yards

Top receivers

- LA – Marcus Allen – 4 receptions, 64 yards
- SF – Dwight Clark – 6 receptions, 106 yards, TD

==== Week 3: at St. Louis Cardinals ====
| Team | 1 | 2 | 3 | 4 | Total |
|---|---|---|---|---|---|
| • 49ers | 3 | 7 | 7 | 14 | 31 |
| Cardinals | 0 | 7 | 6 | 7 | 20 |

- Date: November 21
- Location: Busch Stadium
- Game start: 4:00 p.m. EST
- Game attendance: 38,064
- Game weather: 53 °F or 11.7 °C; wind 10 miles per hour (16 km/h; 8.7 kn)
- Referee: Tom Dooley

Scoring summary
| Q1 | SF | Wersching 36 yard field goal | SF 3–0 |
| Q2 | SF | Moore 1 yard run (Wersching kick) | SF 10–0 |
| Q2 | STL | Green 17 yard pass from Lomax (O'Donoghue kick) | SF 10–7 |
| Q3 | STL | O'Donoghue 30 yard field goal | Tie 10–10 |
| Q3 | STL | O'Donoghue 32 yard field goal | STL 13–10 |
| Q3 | SF | Francis 6 yard pass from Montana (Wersching kick) | SF 17–13 |
| Q4 | SF | Clark 33 yard pass from Montana (Wersching kick) | SF 24–13 |
| Q4 | SF | Cooper 17 yard pass from Montana (Wersching kick) | SF 31–13 |
| Q4 | STL | Anderson 2 yard run (O'Donoghue kick) | SF 31–20 |

== Standings ==
NFC West
| | W | L | T | PCT | DIV | CONF | PF | PA | STK |
|---|---|---|---|---|---|---|---|---|---|
| Atlanta Falcons^{(5)} | 5 | 4 | 0 | .556 | 3–1 | 4–3 | 183 | 199 | L2 |
| New Orleans Saints | 4 | 5 | 0 | .444 | 2–1 | 3–5 | 129 | 160 | W1 |
| San Francisco 49ers | 3 | 6 | 0 | .333 | 1–3 | 2–3 | 209 | 206 | L1 |
| Los Angeles Rams | 2 | 7 | 0 | .222 | 1–2 | 1–5 | 200 | 250 | W1 |

NFC
| # | Team | W | L | T | PCT | PF | PA | STK |
|---|---|---|---|---|---|---|---|---|
Seeded postseason qualifiers
| 1 | Washington Redskins | 8 | 1 | 0 | .889 | 190 | 128 | W4 |
| 2 | Dallas Cowboys | 6 | 3 | 0 | .667 | 226 | 145 | L2 |
| 3 | Green Bay Packers | 5 | 3 | 1 | .611 | 226 | 169 | L1 |
| 4 (Note: Minnesota (4–1), Atlanta (4–3), St. Louis (5–4), Tampa Bay (3–3) seeds were determined by best won-lost record in conference games.) | Minnesota Vikings | 5 | 4 | 0 | .556 | 187 | 198 | W1 |
| 5 | Atlanta Falcons | 5 | 4 | 0 | .556 | 183 | 199 | L2 |
| 6 | St. Louis Cardinals | 5 | 4 | 0 | .556 | 135 | 170 | L1 |
| 7 | Tampa Bay Buccaneers | 5 | 4 | 0 | .556 | 158 | 178 | W3 |
| 8 (Note: Detroit finished ahead of New Orleans and the N.Y. Giants based on best conference record (4–4 to Saints’ 3–5 to Giants’ 3–5).) | Detroit Lions | 4 | 5 | 0 | .444 | 181 | 176 | W1 |
Did not qualify for the postseason
| 9 | New Orleans Saints | 4 | 5 | 0 | .444 | 129 | 160 | W1 |
| 10 | New York Giants | 4 | 5 | 0 | .444 | 164 | 160 | W1 |
| 11 (Note: San Francisco finished ahead of Chicago, and Chicago finished ahead of Philadelphia, based on conference record (49ers’ 2–3 to Bears’ 2–5 to Eagles’ 1–5).) | San Francisco 49ers | 3 | 6 | 0 | .333 | 209 | 206 | L1 |
| 12 | Chicago Bears | 3 | 6 | 0 | .333 | 141 | 174 | L1 |
| 13 | Philadelphia Eagles | 3 | 6 | 0 | .333 | 191 | 195 | L1 |
| 14 | Los Angeles Rams | 2 | 7 | 0 | .222 | 200 | 250 | W1 |
Tiebreakers
