= 1984 San Francisco 49ers season =

American football team season

- Owner: Eddie DeBartolo, Jr.
- General manager: John McVay and Carmen Policy
- Head coach: Bill Walsh
- Defensive coordinator: George Seifert
- Home stadium: Candlestick Park

Results
- Record: 15–1
- Division place: 1st NFC West
- Playoffs: Won Divisional Playoffs (vs. Giants) 21–10; Won NFC Championship (vs. Bears) 23–0; Won Super Bowl XIX (vs. Dolphins) 38–16
- All-Pros: 9: QB Joe Montana; T Keith Fahnhorst; G Randy Cross; G John Ayers; C Fred Quillan; LB Keena Turner; CB Eric Wright; CB Ronnie Lott; FS Dwight Hicks
- Pro Bowlers: 10: QB Joe Montana; RB Wendell Tyler; T Keith Fahnhorst; G Randy Cross; C Fred Quillan; LB Keena Turner; CB Eric Wright; CB Ronnie Lott; SS Carlton Williamson; FS Dwight Hicks

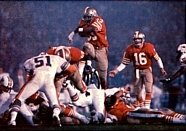
The 49ers playing against the Dolphins in Super Bowl XIX.

The 1984 San Francisco 49ers season was their 35th season in the National Football League (NFL) and 39th overall. The season was highlighted by their second Super Bowl victory. The franchise had its best season ever, with a record of 15 wins and only 1 loss to the Pittsburgh Steelers. Quarterback Joe Montana was awarded the Super Bowl's Most Valuable Player Award for the second time in his career, joining Bart Starr and Terry Bradshaw as the only two-time Super Bowl MVPs.

== History ==
The 1984 49ers became the first team to win fifteen games in the NFL's regular season since the league went to a sixteen-game schedule in 1978. The 49ers, if not for their loss to the Steelers, would have become the 2nd team after the 1972 Miami Dolphins to complete a perfect season, and the Forty-Niners would have been the first to do so since the NFL expanded to a 16-game schedule. The 1985 Chicago Bears, the 1998 Minnesota Vikings, the 2004 Pittsburgh Steelers, the 2011 Green Bay Packers, 2015 Carolina Panthers, the 2024 Detroit Lions, and the 2024 Kansas City Chiefs would later join the 1984 49ers to win 15 games, although the 2007 New England Patriots would exceed this feat by finishing the regular season at an unbeaten 16–0, losing the Super Bowl to the New York Giants 17–14. However, the only other one of these teams that won the Super Bowl was the 1985 Bears.

In the playoffs, the 49ers were the #1 seed. They defeated the Giants 21–10 in the divisional round. Then they shut out the Chicago Bears 23–0 in the NFC Championship and finally defeated the Miami Dolphins 38–16 in Super Bowl XIX. This 49ers team has gone down as the best in franchise history, and many call this season the best in Joe Montana's career.

NFL Films produced a documentary about the team's season entitled A Team Above All; Brad Crandall narrated it. On January 29, 2007, NFL Network aired America's Game: The Super Bowl Champions, in which they ranked the 1984 49ers at #8; the film was narrated by Gene Hackman and featured commentary from players Russ Francis, Keena Turner and Dwight Hicks. More than a decade later, the team gained greater esteem by ranking #4 on the 100 greatest teams of all time presented by the NFL on its 100th anniversary.

== Offseason ==
=== NFL draft ===
Round	Pick	Player	Position	College
1	24	Todd Shell	LB	Brigham Young
2	Choice to L.A. Raiders			
2	56^{(Choice from L.A. Raiders)}	John Frank	TE	Ohio State
3	73^{(Choice from St. Louis)}	Guy McIntyre	G	Georgia
3	Choice to St. Louis			
4	Choice from Tampa Bay to Seattle			
4	Choice to San Diego			
5	121^{(Choice from Atlanta)}	Michael Carter	NT	Southern Methodist
5	Choice from Denver to Atlanta			
5	Choice to St. Louis			
5	139^{(Choice from Washington through L.A. Raiders)}	Jeff Fuller	DB	Texas A&M
6	Choice to Atlanta			
7	Choice to New England			
8	Choice to San Diego			
9	239^{(Choice from Chicago)}	Lee Miller	DB	Cal State Fullerton
9	248	Derrick Harmon	RB	Cornell
10	275	Dave Moritz	WR	Iowa
11	304	Kirk Pendleton	WR	Brigham Young
12	Choice from Chicago to Miami			
12	Choice to San Diego			

=== NFL supplemental draft ===
Round	Pick	Player	Position	Pro Team	College
1	24	Derrick Crawford	WR	Memphis Showboats (USFL)	Memphis State
2	51	Joe Conwell	OT	Philadelphia Stars (USFL)	North Carolina
3	80	Mark Schellen	RB	New Orleans Breakers (USFL)	Nebraska

== Training camp ==
The 1984 San Francisco 49ers held training camp at Sierra College in Rocklin, California.

== Personnel ==
=== Staff / coaches ===
1984 San Francisco 49ers staff
Front office: Owner – Edward J. DeBartolo, Jr.; President – Bill Walsh; Vice president/general counsel – Carmen Policy; Vice president/general manager – John McVay; Director of college scouting – Tony Razzano; Director of pro personnel – Allan Webb; Director of research and development – Neal Dahlen; Head coaches: Head coach – Bill Walsh; Offensive coaches: Quarterbacks/receivers – Paul Hackett; Running backs – Sherman Lewis; Offensive line – Bobb McKittrick; Assistant offensive line/tight ends – Fred von Appen	Defensive coaches: Defensive coordinator – George Seifert; Defensive line – Bill McPherson; Linebackers – Norb Hecker; Defensive backs – Ray Rhodes; Defensive assistant – Tommy Hart; Special teams coaches: Special teams – Fred von Appen; Strength and conditioning: Physical development coordinator – Jerry Attaway

=== Roster ===
1984 San Francisco 49ers roster
Quarterbacks (QB): 6 Matt Cavanaugh; 16 Joe Montana; Running backs (RB): 33 Roger Craig; 24 Derrick Harmon; 32 Carl Monroe; 30 Bill Ring; 26 Wendell Tyler; Wide receivers (WR): 87 Dwight Clark; 83 Renaldo Nehemiah; 88 Freddie Solomon; 85 Mike Wilson; Tight ends (TE): 89 Earl Cooper; 81 Russ Francis; 86 John Frank; 84 Al Dixon	Offensive linemen (OL): 68 John Ayers G; 51 Randy Cross G/C; 71 Keith Fahnhorst T; 66 Allan Kennedy T; 62 Guy McIntyre G; 77 Bubba Paris T; 56 Fred Quillan C; 67 Billy Shields T; Defensive linemen (DL): 76 Dwaine Board DE; 95 Michael Carter NT; 74 Fred Dean DE; 97 Gary Johnson DE; 94 Louie Kelcher NT; 65 Lawrence Pillers DE; 72 Jeff Stover DE; 79 Jim Stuckey DE; 78 Manu Tuiasosopo NT	Linebackers (LB): 57 Dan Bunz OLB; 50 Riki Ellison ILB; 53 Milt McColl OLB; 52 Blanchard Montgomery OLB; 64 Jack Reynolds ILB; 90 Todd Shell OLB; 58 Keena Turner OLB; 99 Michael Walter ILB; Defensive backs (DB): 29 Mario Clark CB; 49 Jeff Fuller CB/S; 22 Dwight Hicks FS; 28 Tom Holmoe SS; 42 Ronnie Lott CB; 43 Dana McLemore CB; 27 Carlton Williamson SS; 21 Eric Wright CB; Special teams (ST): 4 Max Runager P; 14 Ray Wersching K	Reserve: 47 Tim Collier CB (IR); 93 Don Dow T (IR); 55 Jim Fahnhorst LB (IR); 54 Ron Ferrari LB (IR); 45 Danny Fulton WR (IR); 75 John Harty DE (IR); 61 Jesse Sapolu G (IR); Rookies in italics 49 active, 7 reserve

== Preseason ==
=== Schedule ===
Week	Date	Opponent	Result	Record	Venue	Attendance	Recap
1	August 4	Los Angeles Raiders	W 13–10	1–0	Candlestick Park	54,990	Recap
2	August 11	at Denver Broncos	L 13–20	1–1	Mile High Stadium	70,211	Recap
3	August 18	at San Diego Chargers	L 15–35	1–2	Jack Murphy Stadium	58,356	Recap
4	August 24	Seattle Seahawks	W 23–21	2–2	Candlestick Park	49,219	Recap

== Preseason Game summaries ==
=== Week P2 (Saturday, August 4, 1984): vs. Los Angeles Raiders ===
Preseason Week 1: Los Angeles Raiders at San Francisco 49ers – Game summary

Quarter	1	2	3	4	Total
Raiders (0-1)	0	3	7	0	10
49ers (1–0)	7	0	3	3	13

at Candlestick Park • San Francisco, California

- Date: August 4, 1984
- Game time: 6:00 p.m. PDT
- Game attendance: 54,990
- TV: KPIX-TV

Team	Category	Player	Statistics
RAI	Passing		
RAI	Rushing		
RAI	Receiving		
SF	Passing		
SF	Rushing		
SF	Receiving		

Scoring summary

Quarter	Time	Drive			Team	Scoring information	Score	
Quarter	Time	Plays	Yards	TOP	Team	Scoring information	RAI	SF
"TOP" = time of possession. For other American football terms, see Glossary of American football.							10	13

- Point spread:
- Over/under:
- Time of game:

Raiders	Game Statistics	49ers
	First downs	
	Rushes–yards	
	Passing yards	
	Passes	
	Sacked–yards	
	Net passing yards	
	Total yards	
	Return yards	
	Punts	
	Fumbles–lost	
	Penalties–yards	
	Time of possession	

=== Week P2 (Saturday, August 11, 1984): at Denver Broncos ===
Preseason Week 2: San Francisco 49ers at Denver Broncos – Game summary

Quarter	1	2	3	4	Total
49ers (1–1)	3	17	0	0	20
Broncos (1–1)	0	7	7	7	21

at Mile High Stadium • Denver, Colorado

- Date: August 11, 1984
- Game time: 6:00 p.m. PDT
- Game attendance: 70,211
- TV: KPIX-TV

Team	Category	Player	Statistics
SF	Passing		
SF	Rushing		
SF	Receiving		
DEN	Passing		
DEN	Rushing		
DEN	Receiving		

Scoring summary

Quarter	Time	Drive			Team	Scoring information	Score	
Quarter	Time	Plays	Yards	TOP	Team	Scoring information	SF	DEN
"TOP" = time of possession. For other American football terms, see Glossary of American football.							20	21

- Point spread:
- Over/under:
- Time of game:

49ers	Game Statistics	Broncos
	First downs	
	Rushes–yards	
	Passing yards	
	Passes	
	Sacked–yards	
	Net passing yards	
	Total yards	
	Return yards	
	Punts	
	Fumbles–lost	
	Penalties–yards	
	Time of possession	

=== Week P3 (Saturday, August 18, 1984): at San Diego Chargers ===
Preseason Week 3: San Francisco 49ers at San Diego Chargers – Game summary

Quarter	1	2	3	4	Total
49ers (1–2)	0	6	0	9	15
Chargers (2–1)	7	7	14	7	35

at Jack Murphy Stadium • San Diego, California

- Date: August 18, 1984
- Game time: 6:00 p.m. PDT
- Game attendance: 58,356
- TV announcers (CBS): Pat Summerall (play-by-play) and, John Madden (color commentator)

Team	Category	Player	Statistics
SF	Passing		
SF	Rushing		
SF	Receiving		
SD	Passing		
SD	Rushing		
SD	Receiving		

Scoring summary

Quarter	Time	Drive			Team	Scoring information	Score	
Quarter	Time	Plays	Yards	TOP	Team	Scoring information	SF	SD
"TOP" = time of possession. For other American football terms, see Glossary of American football.							15	35

- Point spread:
- Over/under:
- Time of game:

49ers	Game Statistics	Chargers
	First downs	
	Rushes–yards	
	Passing yards	
	Passes	
	Sacked–yards	
	Net passing yards	
	Total yards	
	Return yards	
	Punts	
	Fumbles–lost	
	Penalties–yards	
	Time of possession	

=== Week P4 (Friday, August 24, 1984): vs. Seattle Seahawks ===
Preseason Week 4: Seattle Seahawks at San Francisco 49ers – Game summary

Quarter	1	2	3	4	Total
Seahawks (4–1)	0	0	0	7	7
49ers (2–2)	7	7	3	0	17

at Candlestick Park • San Francisco, California

- Date: August 24, 1984
- Game time: 6:00 p.m. PDT
- Game attendance: 49,219
- TV: KPIX-TV

Team	Category	Player	Statistics
SEA	Passing		
SEA	Rushing		
SEA	Receiving		
SF	Passing		
SF	Rushing		
SF	Receiving		

Scoring summary

Quarter	Time	Drive			Team	Scoring information	Score	
Quarter	Time	Plays	Yards	TOP	Team	Scoring information	SEA	SF
"TOP" = time of possession. For other American football terms, see Glossary of American football.							7	17

- Point spread:
- Over/under:
- Time of game:

Seahawks	Game Statistics	49ers
	First downs	
	Rushes–yards	
	Passing yards	
	Passes	
	Sacked–yards	
	Net passing yards	
	Total yards	
	Return yards	
	Punts	
	Fumbles–lost	
	Penalties–yards	
	Time of possession	

== Regular season ==
The 49ers advanced to their second Super Bowl in team history after becoming the first team ever to win 15 regular season games since the league expanded to a 16-game schedule in 1978. Much of the hype surrounding the team was their offense, which boasted 5 Pro Bowlers. Quarterback Joe Montana recorded 279 out of 432 completions for 3,630 yards, 28 touchdowns, and only 10 interceptions. Running back Roger Craig was one of the 49ers' major weapons, both rushing and receiving. Craig was the team's second leading rusher with 649 rushing yards and 7 touchdowns, and also caught 71 passes for 675 yards. Pro Bowl running back Wendell Tyler, who had rushed for a team record 1,262 yards during the regular season, recorded 7 rushing touchdowns, and also caught 28 passes for 230 yards and 2 touchdown receptions. Wide receivers Freddie Solomon and Dwight Clark also were deep threats, gaining a combined total of 1,617 yards and 16 touchdowns. Up front, 3 of the 49ers' 5 starting offensive linemen, Randy Cross, Fred Quillan, and Keith Fahnhorst, had been selected to play in the Pro Bowl. Overall, San Francisco's offense finished the season ranked second in the NFL in scoring (475 points) and fourth in total yards (6,544).

Although they did not get as much media attention as the offense, the 49ers defense led the league in fewest points allowed during the regular season (227). All 4 of the 49ers' starting defensive backs, Ronnie Lott, Eric Wright, Carlton Williamson, and Dwight Hicks, were selected to play in the Pro Bowl. Pro Bowl linebacker Keena Turner was also a major defensive weapon, recording 2 sacks and 4 interceptions for 51 yards. Defensive end Dwaine Board anchored the line, recording 10 sacks and 1 fumble recovery.

=== Schedule ===
Week	Date	Opponent	Result	Record	Venue	Attendance	Recap
1	September 2	at Detroit Lions	**W** 30–27	1–0	Pontiac Silverdome	56,782	Recap
2	September 10	Washington Redskins	**W** 37–31	2–0	Candlestick Park	59,707	Recap
3	September 16	**New Orleans Saints**	**W** 30–20	3–0	Candlestick Park	57,611	Recap
4	September 23	at Philadelphia Eagles	**W** 21–9	4–0	Veterans Stadium	62,771	Recap
5	September 30	**Atlanta Falcons**	**W** 14–5	5–0	Candlestick Park	57,990	Recap
6	October 8	at New York Giants	**W** 31–10	6–0	Giants Stadium	76,112	Recap
7	October 14	Pittsburgh Steelers	**L** 17–20	6–1	Candlestick Park	59,110	Recap
8	October 21	at Houston Oilers	**W** 34–21	7–1	Astrodome	39,900	Recap
9	October 28	at **Los Angeles Rams**	**W** 33–0	8–1	Anaheim Stadium	65,481	Recap
10	November 4	Cincinnati Bengals	**W** 23–17	9–1	Candlestick Park	58,324	Recap
11	November 11	at Cleveland Browns	**W** 41–7	10–1	Cleveland Stadium	60,092	Recap
12	November 18	Tampa Bay Buccaneers	**W** 24–17	11–1	Candlestick Park	57,704	Recap
13	November 25	at **New Orleans Saints**	**W** 35–3	12–1	Louisiana Superdome	65,177	Recap
14	December 2	at **Atlanta Falcons**	**W** 35–17	13–1	Atlanta–Fulton County Stadium	29,644	Recap
15	December 8	Minnesota Vikings	**W** 51–7	14–1	Candlestick Park	56,670	Recap
16	December 14	**Los Angeles Rams**	**W** 19–16	15–1	Candlestick Park	59,743	Recap
Note: Intra-division opponents are in **bold** text.

== Regular season game summaries ==
=== Week 1 (Sunday, September 2, 1984): at Detroit Lions ===
Week 1: San Francisco 49ers at Detroit Lions – Game summary

Quarter	1	2	3	4	Total
49ers (1–0)	7	7	3	13	30
Lions (0–1)	7	6	7	7	27

at Pontiac Silverdome • Pontiac, Michigan

- Date: September 2, 1984
- Game time: 10:00 a.m. PDT
- Game weather: indoors
- Game attendance: 56,782
- Referee: Bob Frederic
- TV announcers (CBS): Tom Brookshier (play-by-play) and Wayne Walker (color commentator)

Team	Category	Player	Statistics
SF	Passing	Joe Montana	16/25, 188 YDS, 1 TD
SF	Rushing	Wendell Tyler	16 CAR, 87 YDS, 2 TDs
SF	Receiving	Freddie Solomon	4 REC, 61 YDS
DET	Passing	Gary Danielson	17/24, 177 YDS, 2 TDs
DET	Rushing	Billy Sims	17 CAR, 69 YDS, 1 TD
DET	Receiving	Leonard Thompson	3 REC, 58 YDS, 1 TD

Scoring summary

Quarter	Time	Drive			Team	Scoring information	Score	
Quarter	Time	Plays	Yards	TOP	Team	Scoring information	SF	DET
1	4:50				Lions	Sims 2-yard touchdown run, Murray kick good	0	7
1	0:00				49ers	Monroe 5-yard touchdown reception from Montana, Wersching kick good	7	7
2	11:07				Lions	39-yard field goal by Murray	7	10
2	5:01				49ers	Tyler 2-yard touchdown run, Wersching kick good	14	10
2	0:03				Lions	43-yard field goal by Murray	14	13
3	6:36				Lions	Jones 2-yard touchdown reception from Danielson, Murray kick good	14	20
3	0:50				49ers	42-yard field goal by Wersching	17	20
4	10:29				49ers	53-yard field goal by Wersching	20	20
4	8:25				49ers	Tyler 9-yard touchdown run, Wersching kick good	27	20
4	5:01				Lions	Thompson 49-yard touchdown reception from Danielson, Murray kick good	27	27
4	0:04				49ers	22-yard field goal by Wersching	30	27
"TOP" = time of possession. For other American football terms, see Glossary of American football.							30	27

- Point spread: 49ers by 2½
- Over/under: 43.0 (over)
- Time of game:

49ers	Game statistics	Lions
24	First downs	19
32–124	Rushes–yards	28–132
188	Passing yards	177
16–25–0	Passes	17–24–0
2–14	Sacked–yards	2–11
174	Net passing yards	166
298	Total yards	298
198	Return yards	98
2–45.5	Punts	4–44.0
2–1	Fumbles–lost	0–0
2–32	Penalties–yards	6–45
30:44	Time of Possession	29:16

=== Week 2 (Monday, September 10, 1984): vs. Washington Redskins ===
Week 2: Washington Redskins at San Francisco 49ers – Game summary

Quarter	1	2	3	4	Total
Redskins (0–2)	0	3	14	14	31
49ers (2–0)	14	13	0	10	37

at Candlestick Park • San Francisco, California

- Date: September 10, 1984
- Game time: 6:00 p.m. PDT
- Game weather: 68 °F (20 °C); wind 17 miles per hour (27 km/h; 15 kn)
- Game attendance: 59,707
- Referee: Dick Jorgensen
- TV announcers (ABC): Frank Gifford (play-by-play), Don Meredith (color commentator) and O. J. Simpson (color commentator)

Team	Category	Player	Statistics
WSH	Passing	Joe Theismann	24/43, 331 YDS, 2 TDs
WSH	Rushing	Joe Theismann	7 CAR, 35 YDS
WSH	Receiving	Art Monk	10 REC, 200 YDS
SF	Passing	Joe Montana	24/40, 381 YDS, 2 TDs
SF	Rushing	Wendell Tyler	20 CAR, 96 YDS, 1 TD
SF	Receiving	Dwight Clark	5 REC, 105 YDS, 1 TD

Scoring summary

Quarter	Time	Drive			Team	Scoring information	Score	
Quarter	Time	Plays	Yards	TOP	Team	Scoring information	WSH	SF
1	10:45				49ers	Tyler 1-yard touchdown run, Wersching kick good	0	7
1	3:49				49ers	Tyler 5-yard touchdown reception from Montana, Wersching kick good	0	14
2	13:21				49ers	19-yard field goal by Wersching	0	17
2	5:46				49ers	46-yard field goal by Wersching	0	20
2	1:46				49ers	Clark 15-yard touchdown reception from Montana, Wersching kick good	0	27
2	0:00				Redskins	38-yard field goal by Moseley	3	27
3	10:46				Redskins	Brown 14-yard touchdown reception from Theismann, Moseley kick good	10	27
3	5:05				Redskins	Riggins 1-yard touchdown run, Moseley kick good	17	27
4	14:51				49ers	Montana 9-yard touchdown run, Wersching kick good	17	34
4	11:42				Redskins	Riggins 1-yard touchdown run, Moseley kick good	24	34
4	9:49				49ers	38-yard field goal by Wersching	24	37
4	3:44				Redskins	Seay 12-yard touchdown reception from Theismann, Moseley kick good	31	37
"TOP" = time of possession. For other American football terms, see Glossary of American football.							31	37

- Point spread: 49ers by 2
- Over/under: 52.0 (over)
- Time of game:

Redskins	Game statistics	49ers
20	First downs	30
21–62	Rushes–yards	40–167
331	Passing yards	381
24–43–0	Passes	24–40–0
4–22	Sacked–yards	2–14
309	Net passing yards	367
371	Total yards	534
132	Return yards	74
7–36.6	Punts	3–34.7
3–0	Fumbles–lost	3–2
6–60	Penalties–yards	6–50
25:15	Time of Possession	34:45

=== Week 3 (Sunday, September 16, 1984): vs. New Orleans Saints ===
Week 3: New Orleans Saints at San Francisco 49ers – Game summary

Quarter	1	2	3	4	Total
Saints (1–2)	0	10	10	0	20
49ers (3–0)	7	10	0	13	30

at Candlestick Park • San Francisco, California

- Date: September 16, 1984
- Game time: 1:00 p.m. PDT
- Game weather: 65 °F (18 °C); wind 16 miles per hour (26 km/h; 14 kn)
- Game attendance: 57,611
- Referee: Tom Dooley
- TV announcers (CBS): Tom Brookshier (play-by-play) and Wayne Walker (color commentator)

Team	Category	Player	Statistics
NO	Passing	Ken Stabler	14/27, 157 YDS, 2 TDs, 2 INTs
NO	Rushing	George Rogers	23 CAR, 88 YDS
NO	Receiving	Eugene Goodlow	6 REC, 62 YDS, 1 TD
SF	Passing	Joe Montana	10/17, 128 YDS, 1 TD, 1 INT
SF	Rushing	Wendell Tyler	10 CAR, 82 YDS, 1 TD
SF	Receiving	Freddie Solomon	3 REC, 72 YDS, 1 TD

Scoring summary

Quarter	Time	Drive			Team	Scoring information	Score	
Quarter	Time	Plays	Yards	TOP	Team	Scoring information	NO	SF
1	9:04				49ers	Solomon 32-yard touchdown reception from Montana, Wersching kick good	0	7
2	14:57				49ers	31-yard field goal by Wersching	0	10
1	9:06				49ers	Tyler 3-yard touchdown run, Wersching kick good	0	17
2	1:20				Saints	Goodlow 8-yard touchdown reception from Stabler, Andersen kick good	7	17
2	0:00				Saints	32-yard field goal by Andersen	10	17
3	11:11				Saints	Brenner 26-yard touchdown reception from Stabler, Andersen kick good	17	17
3	3:11				Saints	41-yard field goal by Andersen	20	17
4	9:33				49ers	Cooper 23-yard touchdown reception from Cavanaugh, Wersching kick good	20	24
4	7:45				49ers	22-yard field goal by Wersching	20	27
4	1:56				49ers	30-yard field goal by Wersching	20	30
"TOP" = time of possession. For other American football terms, see Glossary of American football.							20	30

- Point spread: 49ers by 5½
- Over/under: 45.0 (over)
- Time of game:

Saints	Game statistics	49ers
20	First downs	19
31–119	Rushes–yards	32–148
162	Passing yards	179
16–34–5	Passes	13–26–1
2–13	Sacked–yards	3–20
149	Net passing yards	159
268	Total yards	307
166	Return yards	160
3–46.0	Punts	5–40.8
0–0	Fumbles–lost	0–0
4–47	Penalties–yards	6–54
31:38	Time of Possession	28:22

=== Week 4 (Sunday, September 23, 1984): at Philadelphia Eagles ===
Week 4: San Francisco 49ers at Philadelphia Eagles – Game summary

Quarter	1	2	3	4	Total
49ers (4–0)	7	7	0	7	21
Eagles (1–3)	0	6	3	0	9

at Veterans Stadium • Philadelphia, Pennsylvania

- Date: September 23, 1984
- Game time: 10:00 a.m. PDT
- Game weather: 68 °F (20 °C); wind 9 miles per hour (14 km/h; 7.8 kn)
- Game attendance: 62,771
- Referee: Ben Dreith
- TV announcers (CBS): Tom Brookshier (play-by-play) and Wayne Walker (color commentator)

Team	Category	Player	Statistics
SF	Passing	Matt Cavanaugh	17/34, 252 YDS, 3 TDs
SF	Rushing	Wendell Tyler	21 CAR, 113 YDS
SF	Receiving	Dwight Clark	3 REC, 84 YDS, 1 TD
PHI	Passing	Ron Jaworski	16/40, 187 YDS, 1 INT
PHI	Rushing	Wilbert Montgomery	12 CAR, 51 YDS
PHI	Receiving	Wilbert Montgomery	7 REC, 46 YDS

Scoring summary

Quarter	Time	Drive			Team	Scoring information	Score	
Quarter	Time	Plays	Yards	TOP	Team	Scoring information	SF	PHI
1	1:30				49ers	Craig 35-yard touchdown reception from Cavanaugh, Wersching kick good	7	0
2	11:52				Eagles	35-yard field goal by McFadden	7	3
2	0:55				Eagles	32-yard field goal by McFadden	7	6
2	0:12				49ers	Solomon 2-yard touchdown reception from Cavanaugh, Wersching kick good	14	6
3	6:13				Eagles	43-yard field goal by McFadden	14	9
4	10:10				49ers	Clark 51-yard touchdown reception from Cavanaugh, Wersching kick good	21	9
"TOP" = time of possession. For other American football terms, see Glossary of American football.							21	9

- Point spread: 49ers by 4½
- Over/under: 44.0 (under)
- Time of game:

49ers	Game statistics	Eagles
23	First downs	15
37–177	Rushes–yards	20–72
252	Passing yards	187
17–34–0	Passes	16–41–1
4–31	Sacked–yards	2–18
221	Net passing yards	169
398	Total yards	241
173	Return yards	51
7–39.1	Punts	7–40.0
2–0	Fumbles–lost	0–0
12–141	Penalties–yards	4–30
34:31	Time of Possession	25:29

=== Week 5 (Sunday, September 30, 1984): vs. Atlanta Falcons ===
Week 5: Atlanta Falcons at San Francisco 49ers – Game summary

Quarter	1	2	3	4	Total
Falcons (2–3)	3	0	0	2	5
49ers (5–0)	0	14	0	0	14

at Candlestick Park • San Francisco, California

- Date: September 30, 1984
- Game time: 1:00 p.m. PDT
- Game weather: 56 °F (13 °C); wind 14 miles per hour (23 km/h; 12 kn)
- Game attendance: 57,990
- Referee: Bob McElwee
- TV announcers (CBS): Tom Brookshier (play-by-play) and Wayne Walker (color commentator)

Team	Category	Player	Statistics
ATL	Passing	Steve Bartkowski	22/41, 267 YDS, 2 INTs
ATL	Rushing	Gerald Riggs	28 CAR, 136 YDS
ATL	Receiving	Stacey Bailey	4 REC, 97 YDS
SF	Passing	Joe Montana	13/25, 149 YDS, 2 TDs
SF	Rushing	Wendell Tyler	12 CAR, 99 YDS
SF	Receiving	Mike Wilson	3 REC, 47 YDS, 1 TD

Scoring summary

Quarter	Time	Drive			Team	Scoring information	Score	
Quarter	Time	Plays	Yards	TOP	Team	Scoring information	ATL	SF
1	1:29				Falcons	22-yard field goal by Luckhurst	3	0
2	4:07				49ers	Francis 5-yard touchdown reception from Montana, Wersching kick good	3	7
2	0:27				49ers	Wilson 21-yard touchdown reception from Montana, Wersching kick good	3	14
4	1:45	—	—	—	Falcons	Runager tackled in the end zone by Case for a safety	5	14
"TOP" = time of possession. For other American football terms, see Glossary of American football.							5	14

- Point spread: 49ers by 6
- Over/under: 49.5 (under)
- Time of game:

Falcons	Game statistics	49ers
22	First downs	17
35–161	Rushes–yards	32–161
267	Passing yards	149
22–41–2	Passes	13–25–0
2–10	Sacked–yards	0–0
257	Net passing yards	149
418	Total yards	310
48	Return yards	62
4–38.8	Punts	5–43.8
3–1	Fumbles–lost	3–2
5–45	Penalties–yards	5–56
34:57	Time of Possession	25:03

=== Week 6 (Monday, October 8, 1984): at New York Giants ===
Week 6: San Francisco 49ers at New York Giants – Game summary

Quarter	1	2	3	4	Total
49ers (6–0)	21	7	3	0	31
Giants (3–3)	3	0	0	7	10

at Giants Stadium • East Rutherford, New Jersey

- Date: October 8, 1984
- Game time: 6:00 p.m. PDT
- Game weather: 60 °F (16 °C); wind 12 miles per hour (19 km/h; 10 kn)
- Game attendance: 76,112
- Referee: Red Cashion
- TV announcers (ABC): Frank Gifford (play-by-play), Don Meredith (color commentator) and O. J. Simpson (color commentator)

Team	Category	Player	Statistics
SF	Passing	Joe Montana	15/24, 207 Yds, 3 TDs
SF	Rushing	Wendell Tyler	14 CAR, 101 YDS
SF	Receiving	Roger Craig	7 REC, 95 YDS, 1 TD
NYG	Passing	Phil Simms	24/43, 290 Yds, 2 INTs
NYG	Rushing	Rob Carpenter	11 CAR, 45 YDS
NYG	Receiving	Lionel Manuel	5 REC, 78 YDS

Scoring summary

Quarter	Time	Drive			Team	Scoring information	Score	
Quarter	Time	Plays	Yards	TOP	Team	Scoring information	SF	NYG
1	12:28				49ers	Tyler 59-yard touchdown reception from Montana, Wersching kick good	7	0
1	8:42				49ers	Frank 1-yard touchdown reception from Montana, Wersching kick good	14	0
1	7:27	—	—	—	49ers	McLemore 79-yard kickoff return for a touchdown, Wersching kick good	21	0
1	1:49				Giants	20-yard field goal by Haji-Sheikh	21	3
2	3:49				49ers	Craig 8-yard touchdown reception from Montana, Wersching kick good	28	3
3	9:14				49ers	37-yard field goal by Wersching	31	3
4	1:17				Giants	Woolfolk 2-yard touchdown run, Haji-Sheikh kick good	31	10
"TOP" = time of possession. For other American football terms, see Glossary of American football.							31	10

- Point spread: 49ers by 3
- Over/under: 44.0 (under)
- Time of game:

49ers	Game statistics	Giants
18	First downs	23
32–167	Rushes–yards	23–113
218	Passing yards	303
16–27–0	Passes	25–44–2
1–1	Sacked–yards	4–27
217	Net passing yards	276
384	Total yards	389
123	Return yards	142
5–39.0	Punts	5–42.4
1–0	Fumbles–lost	0–0
7–40	Penalties–yards	3–20
28:08	Time of Possession	31:52

=== Week 7 (Sunday, October 14, 1984): vs. Pittsburgh Steelers ===
Week 7: Pittsburgh Steelers at San Francisco 49ers – Game summary

Quarter	1	2	3	4	Total
Steelers (4–3)	7	3	0	10	20
49ers (6–1)	0	7	0	10	17

at Candlestick Park • San Francisco, California

- Date: October 14, 1984
- Game time: 1:00 p.m. PDT
- Game weather: 60 °F (16 °C); wind 15 miles per hour (24 km/h; 13 kn)
- Game attendance: 59,110
- Referee: Pat Haggerty
- TV announcers (NBC Game only aired in the San Francisco and Pittsburgh markets due to NBC airing Game 5 of the World Series): Jay Randolph (play-by-play) and Bob Trumpy (color commentator)

Team	Category	Player	Statistics
PIT	Passing	Mark Malone	11/18, 156 YDS, 1 TD, 1 INT
PIT	Rushing	Rich Erenberg	11 CAR, 44 YDS, 1 TD
PIT	Receiving	John Stallworth	6 REC, 78 YDS, 1 TD
SF	Passing	Joe Montana	24/34, 241 YDS, 1 INT
SF	Rushing	Wendell Tyler	11 CAR, 59 YDS, 1 TD
SF	Receiving	Roger Craig	7 REC, 43 YDS

Scoring summary

Quarter	Time	Drive			Team	Scoring information	Score	
Quarter	Time	Plays	Yards	TOP	Team	Scoring information	PIT	SF
1	8:39				Steelers	Erenberg 2-yard touchdown run, Anderson kick good	7	0
2	8:00				Steelers	48-yard field goal by Anderson	10	0
2	1:03				49ers	Montana 7-yard touchdown run, Wersching kick good	10	7
4	14:52				49ers	30-yard field goal by Wersching	10	10
4	10:48				49ers	Tyler 7-yard touchdown run, Wersching kick good	10	17
4	3:21				Steelers	Stallworth 6-yard touchdown reception from Malone, Anderson kick good	17	17
4	1:42				Steelers	21-yard field goal by Anderson	20	17
"TOP" = time of possession. For other American football terms, see Glossary of American football.							20	17

- Point spread: 49ers by 8
- Over/under: 42.0 (under)
- Time of game:

Steelers	Game statistics	49ers
23	First downs	22
47–175	Rushes–yards	20–117
156	Passing yards	241
11–18–1	Passes	24–35–1
1–7	Sacked–yards	0–0
149	Net passing yards	241
324	Total yards	358
106	Return yards	131
2–41.0	Punts	3–30.7
1–0	Fumbles–lost	1–0
11–68	Penalties–yards	8–57
34:45	Time of Possession	25:15

The 49ers' hope for a perfect season was foiled by the Steelers when Gary Anderson kicked the game-winning field goal in the fourth quarter that would ultimately prevent the 49ers from going undefeated.

=== Week 8 (Sunday, October 21, 1984): at Houston Oilers ===
Week 8: San Francisco 49ers at Houston Oilers – Game summary

Quarter	1	2	3	4	Total
49ers (7–1)	10	7	3	14	34
Oilers (0–8)	0	7	7	7	21

at Houston Astrodome • Houston, Texas

- Date: October 21, 1984
- Game time: 1:00 p.m. PDT
- Game weather: indoors
- Game attendance: 39,900
- Referee: Gene Barth
- TV announcers (CBS): Tom Brookshier (play-by-play) and Wayne Walker (color commentator)

Team	Category	Player	Statistics
SF	Passing	Joe Montana	25/35, 353 YDS, 3 TDs, 1 INT
SF	Rushing	Wendell Tyler	23 CAR, 108 YDS
SF	Receiving	Dwight Clark	5 REC, 127 YDS, 1 TD
HOU	Passing	Warren Moon	25/33, 356 YDS, 2 TDs, 2 INTs
HOU	Rushing	Larry Moriarty	9 CAR, 36 YDS, 1 TD
HOU	Receiving	Tim Smith	6 REC, 101 YDS, 1 TD

Scoring summary

Quarter	Time	Drive			Team	Scoring information	Score	
Quarter	Time	Plays	Yards	TOP	Team	Scoring information	SF	HOU
1	9:56				49ers	Francis 11-yard touchdown reception from Montana, Wersching kick good	7	0
1	3:17				49ers	26-yard field goal by Wersching	10	0
2	14:49				Oilers	Moriarty 1-yard touchdown run, Kempf kick good	10	7
2	0:29				49ers	Tyler 26-yard touchdown reception from Montana, Wersching kick good	17	7
3	12:22				49ers	22-yard field goal by Wersching	20	7
3	5:42				Oilers	Smith 45-yard touchdown reception from Moon, Kemof kick good	20	14
4	7:50				49ers	Craig 5-yard touchdown run, Wersching kick good	27	14
4	5:18				Oilers	Williams 29-yard touchdown reception from Moon, Kempf kick good	27	21
4	5:00				49ers	Clark 80-yard touchdown reception from Montana, Wersching kick good	34	21
"TOP" = time of possession. For other American football terms, see Glossary of American football.							34	21

- Point spread: 49ers by 11
- Over/under: 42.0 (over)
- Time of game:

49ers	Game statistics	Oilers
25	First downs	22
38–164	Rushes–yards	18–82
353	Passing yards	356
25–35–1	Passes	25–33–2
1–0	Sacked–yards	2–6
353	Net passing yards	350
517	Total yards	432
85	Return yards	105
3–49.3	Punts	3–46.3
2–0	Fumbles–lost	3–1
8–70	Penalties–yards	7–75
34:13	Time of Possession	25:47

=== Week 9 (Sunday, October 28, 1984): at Los Angeles Rams ===
Week 9: San Francisco 49ers at Los Angeles Rams – Game summary

Quarter	1	2	3	4	Total
49ers (8–1)	3	16	7	7	33
Rams (5–4)	0	0	0	0	0

at Anaheim Stadium • Anaheim, California

- Date: October 28, 1984
- Game time: 1:00 p.m. PST
- Game weather: 60 °F (16 °C); wind 7 miles per hour (11 km/h; 6.1 kn)
- Game attendance: 65,481
- Referee: Bob Frederic
- TV announcers (CBS): Tom Brookshier (play-by-play) and Wayne Walker (color commentator)

Team	Category	Player	Statistics
SF	Passing	Joe Montana	21/31, 365 YDS, 3 TDs
SF	Rushing	Wendell Tyler	13 CAR, 27 YDS
SF	Receiving	Freddie Solomon	6 REC, 94 YDS, 1 TD
RAM	Passing	Jeff Kemp	14/30, 180 YDS, 2 INTs
RAM	Rushing	Eric Dickerson	13 CAR, 38 YDS
RAM	Receiving	Henry Ellard	4 REC, 91 YDS

Scoring summary

Quarter	Time	Drive			Team	Scoring information	Score	
Quarter	Time	Plays	Yards	TOP	Team	Scoring information	SF	RAM
1	10:22				49ers	46-yard field goal by Wersching	3	0
2	7:17				49ers	46-yard field goal by Wersching	6	0
2	4:30				49ers	Craig 64-yard touchdown reception from Montana, Wersching kick no good (pass)	12	0
2	2:38				49ers	Solomon 6-yard touchdown reception from Montana, Wersching kick good	19	0
3	3:11				49ers	Craig 6-yard touchdown run, Wersching kick good	26	0
4	7:02				49ers	Clark 44-yard touchdown reception from Montana, Wersching kick good	33	0
"TOP" = time of possession. For other American football terms, see Glossary of American football.							33	0

- Point spread: 49ers by 3
- Over/under: 45.0 (under)
- Time of game:

49ers	Game statistics	Rams
23	First downs	12
39–111	Rushes–yards	19–72
376	Passing yards	180
22–32–0	Passes	14–30–2
2–15	Sacked–yards	5–46
361	Net passing yards	134
472	Total yards	206
35	Return yards	123
3–38.0	Punts	6–39.8
2–2	Fumbles–lost	5–3
6–41	Penalties–yards	3–25
35:26	Time of Possession	24:34

=== Week 10 (Sunday, November 4, 1984): vs. Cincinnati Bengals ===
Week 10: Cincinnati Bengals at San Francisco 49ers – Game summary

Quarter	1	2	3	4	Total
Bengals (3–7)	3	14	0	0	17
49ers (9–1)	0	7	3	13	23

at Candlestick Park • San Francisco, California

- Date: November 4, 1984
- Game time: 1:00 p.m. PST
- Game weather: 56 °F (13 °C); wind 14 miles per hour (23 km/h; 12 kn)
- Game attendance: 58,234
- Referee: Dick Jorgensen
- TV announcers (NBC): Len Berman (play-by-play) and Gene Washington (color commentator)

Team	Category	Player	Statistics
CIN	Passing	Ken Anderson	21/34, 269 YDS, 1 TD, 2 INTs
CIN	Rushing	Charles Alexander	8 CAR, 48 YDS
CIN	Receiving	Cris Collinsworth	4 REC, 71 YDS, 1 TD
SF	Passing	Joe Montana	27/42, 301 YDS, 2 TDs, 4 INTs
SF	Rushing	Wendell Tyler	14 CAR, 52 YDS
SF	Receiving	Dwight Clark	7 REC, 124 YDS

Scoring summary

Quarter	Time	Drive			Team	Scoring information	Score	
Quarter	Time	Plays	Yards	TOP	Team	Scoring information	CIN	SF
1	1:05				Bengals	39-yard field goal by Breech	3	0
2	12:07				49ers	Cooper 12-yard touchdown reception from Montana, Wersching kick good	3	7
2	7:02				Bengals	Kinnebrew 6-yard touchdown run, Breech kick good	10	7
2	3:10				Bengals	Collinsworth 7-yard touchdown reception from Anderson, Breech kick good	17	7
3	8:54				49ers	29-yard field goal by Wersching	17	10
4	9:46				49ers	35-yard field goal by Wersching	17	13
4	5:44				49ers	24-yard field goal by Wersching	17	16
4	1:39				49ers	Solomon 4-yard touchdown reception from Montana, Wersching kick good	17	23
"TOP" = time of possession. For other American football terms, see Glossary of American football.							17	23

- Point spread: 49ers by 10½
- Over/under: 43.0 (under)
- Time of game:

Bengals	Game statistics	49ers
21	First downs	26
25–116	Rushes–yards	31–91
269	Passing yards	301
21–34–2	Passes	27–42–4
6–39	Sacked–yards	1–7
230	Net passing yards	294
346	Total yards	385
144	Return yards	190
6–38.2	Punts	2–47.0
0–0	Fumbles–lost	0–0
6–46	Penalties–yards	5–30
29:24	Time of Possession	30:36

=== Week 11 (Sunday, November 11, 1984): at Cleveland Browns ===
Week 11: San Francisco 49ers at Cleveland Browns – Game summary

Quarter	1	2	3	4	Total
49ers (10–1)	6	7	14	14	41
Browns (2–9)	0	0	0	7	7

at Cleveland Municipal Stadium • Cleveland, Ohio

- Date: November 11, 1984
- Game time: 10:00 a.m. PST
- Game weather: 45 °F (7 °C); wind 15 miles per hour (24 km/h; 13 kn)
- Game attendance: 60,092
- Referee: Fred Silva
- TV announcers (CBS): Tom Brookshier (play-by-play) and Wayne Walker (color commentator)

Team	Category	Player	Statistics
SF	Passing	Joe Montana	24/30, 263 YDS, 2 TDs, 1 INT
SF	Rushing	Wendell Tyler	17 CAR, 87 YDS
SF	Receiving	Freddie Solomon	5 REC, 105 YDS, 2 TDs
CLE	Passing	Paul McDonald	13/33, 220 YDS, 1 TD, 1 INT
CLE	Rushing	Boyce Green	13 CAR, 38 YDS
CLE	Receiving	Bruce Davis	4 REC, 64 YDS, 1 TD

Scoring summary

Quarter	Time	Drive			Team	Scoring information	Score	
Quarter	Time	Plays	Yards	TOP	Team	Scoring information	SF	CLE
1	13:26				49ers	47-yard field goal by Wersching	3	0
1	7:16				49ers	26-yard field goal by Wersching	6	0
2	10:56				49ers	Craig 20-yard touchdown run, Wersching kick good	13	0
3	4:34				49ers	Craig 2-yard touchdown run, Wersching kick good	20	0
3	0:00				49ers	Solomon 60-yard touchdown reception from Montana, Wersching kick good	27	0
4	10:33				49ers	Solomon 2-yard touchdown reception from Montana, Wersching kick good	34	0
4	6:56				49ers	Ring 5-yard touchdown run, Wersching kick good	41	0
4	3:38				Browns	Davis 18-yard touchdown reception from McDonald, Bahr kick good	41	7
"TOP" = time of possession. For other American football terms, see Glossary of American football.							41	7

- Point spread: 49ers by 6
- Over/under: 35.0 (over)
- Time of game:

49ers	Game statistics	Browns
23	First downs	10
39–213	Rushes–yards	20–43
263	Passing yards	220
24–30–1	Passes	13–33–1
1–8	Sacked–yards	2–12
255	Net passing yards	208
468	Total yards	251
90	Return yards	125
2–38.5	Punts	6–37.0
1–1	Fumbles–lost	5–3
7–45	Penalties–yards	5–32
35:27	Time of Possession	24:33

=== Week 12 (Sunday, November 18, 1984): vs. Tampa Bay Buccaneers ===
Week 12: Tampa Bay Buccaneers at San Francisco 49ers – Game summary

Quarter	1	2	3	4	Total
Buccaneers (4–8)	0	10	0	7	17
49ers (11–1)	0	14	7	3	24

at Candlestick Park • San Francisco, California

- Date: November 18, 1984
- Game time: 1:01 p.m. PST
- Game weather: 56 °F (13 °C); wind 14 miles per hour (23 km/h; 12 kn)
- Game attendance: 57,704
- Referee: Tom Dooley
- TV announcers (CBS): Tom Brookshier (play-by-play) and Wayne Walker (color commentator)

Team	Category	Player	Statistics
TB	Passing	Steve DeBerg	26/41, 316 YDS, 2 TDs, 2 INTs
TB	Rushing	James Wilder Sr.	18 CAR, 89 YDS
TB	Receiving	Gerald Carter	9 REC, 166 YDS, 1 TD
SF	Passing	Joe Montana	19/23, 247 YDS
SF	Rushing	Wendell Tyler	16 CAR, 97 YDS, 1 TD
SF	Receiving	Dwight Clark	5 REC, 56 YDS

Scoring summary

Quarter	Time	Drive			Team	Scoring information	Score	
Quarter	Time	Plays	Yards	TOP	Team	Scoring information	TB	SF
2	10:44	7	44	3:21	49ers	Craig 2-yard touchdown run, Wersching kick good	0	7
2	7:13	8	69	3:31	Buccaneers	27-yard field goal by Ariri	3	7
2	10:56	9	80	4:07	49ers	Solomon 4-yard touchdown run, Wersching kick good	3	14
2	0:49	8	80	2:17	Buccaneers	Giles 9-yard touchdown reception from DeBerg, Ariri kick good	10	14
3	4:06	10	92	6:16	49ers	Tyler 1-yard touchdown run, Wersching kick good	10	21
4	12:39	11	83	6:27	Buccaneers	Carter 9-yard touchdown reception from DeBerg, Ariri kick good	17	21
4	8:39	7	46	4:00	49ers	39-yard field goal by Wersching	17	24
"TOP" = time of possession. For other American football terms, see Glossary of American football.							17	24

- Point spread: 49ers by 12
- Over/under: 40.0 (over)
- Time of game: 2 hours, 52 minutes

Buccaneers	Game statistics	49ers
23	First downs	25
20–89	Rushes–yards	39–190
316	Passing yards	247
26–41–0	Passes	19–23–0
1–8	Sacked–yards	2–9
308	Net passing yards	238
397	Total yards	428
61	Return yards	99
3–41.0	Punts	2–48.0
2–1	Fumbles–lost	3–3
7–38	Penalties–yards	3–35
28:17	Time of Possession	31:43

=== Week 13 (Sunday, November 25, 1984): at New Orleans Saints ===
Week 13: San Francisco 49ers at New Orleans Saints – Game summary

Quarter	1	2	3	4	Total
49ers (12–1)	0	7	14	14	35
Saints (6–7)	0	3	0	0	3

at Louisiana Superdome • New Orleans, Louisiana

- Date: November 25, 1984
- Game time: 1:00 p.m. PST/3:00 p.m. CST
- Game weather: indoors
- Game attendance: 65,177
- Referee: Jerry Markbreit
- TV announcers (CBS): Verne Lundquist (play-by-play) and Terry Bradshaw (color commentator)

Team	Category	Player	Statistics
SF	Passing	Joe Montana	14/30, 177 YDS, 2 TDs
SF	Rushing	Wendell Tyler	15 CAR, 117 YDS
SF	Receiving	Freddie Solomon	3 REC, 63 YDS, 1 TD
NO	Passing	Richard Todd	9/18, 72 YDS, 1 INT
NO	Rushing	George Rogers	21 CAR, 88 YDS
NO	Receiving	Tyrone Anthony	4 REC, 31 YDS

Scoring summary

Quarter	Time	Drive			Team	Scoring information	Score	
Quarter	Time	Plays	Yards	TOP	Team	Scoring information	SF	NO
2	5:43				49ers	Craig 1-yard touchdown run, Wersching kick good	7	0
2	2:18				Saints	27-yard field goal by Andersen	7	3
3	8:36				49ers	Cooper 19-yard touchdown reception from Montana, Wersching kick good	14	3
3	6:52				49ers	Solomon 28-yard touchdown reception from Montana, Wersching kick good	21	3
4	11:35	—	—	—	49ers	Interception returned 53 yards for touchdown by Shell, Wersching kick good	28	3
4	10:39				49ers	Ring 1-yard touchdown run, Wersching kick good	35	3
"TOP" = time of possession. For other American football terms, see Glossary of American football.							35	3

- Point spread: 49ers by 2
- Over/under: 42.0 (under)
- Time of game:

49ers	Game statistics	Saints
22	First downs	12
33–219	Rushes–yards	28–131
201	Passing yards	118
15–32–0	Passes	14–26–1
1–13	Sacked–yards	8–48
188	Net passing yards	70
407	Total yards	201
107	Return yards	113
6–44.3	Punts	8–45.5
1–0	Fumbles–lost	1–0
4–60	Penalties–yards	3–20
27:48	Time of Possession	32:12

=== Week 14 (Sunday, December 2, 1984): at Atlanta Falcons ===
Week 14: San Francisco 49ers at Atlanta Falcons – Game summary

Quarter	1	2	3	4	Total
49ers (13–1)	7	14	7	7	35
Falcons (3–11)	3	7	7	0	17

at Atlanta–Fulton County Stadium • Atlanta, Georgia

- Date: December 2, 1984
- Game time: 10:00 a.m. PST
- Game weather: 46 °F (8 °C); wind 9 miles per hour (14 km/h; 7.8 kn)
- Game attendance: 29,644
- Referee: Jim Tunney
- TV announcers (CBS): Tom Brookshier (play-by-play) and Wayne Walker (color commentator)

Team	Category	Player	Statistics
SF	Passing	Joe Montana	12/24, 165 YDS, 2 TDs, 2 INTs
SF	Rushing	Wendell Tyler	15 CAR, 69 YDS
SF	Receiving	Earl Cooper	4 REC, 51 YDS
ATL	Passing	Mike Moroski	22/43, 289 YDS, 1 TD, 3 INTs
ATL	Rushing	Gerald Riggs	30 CAR, 133 YDS, 1 TD
ATL	Receiving	Alfred Jackson	11 REC, 193 YDS, 1 TD

Scoring summary

Quarter	Time	Drive			Team	Scoring information	Score	
Quarter	Time	Plays	Yards	TOP	Team	Scoring information	SF	ATL
1	11:38				Falcons	32-yard field goal by Luckhurst	0	3
1	9:49				49ers	Solomon 64-yard touchdown reception from Montana, Wersching kick good	7	3
2	14:50				49ers	Clark 6-yard touchdown reception from Montana, Wersching kick good	14	3
2	3:04				Falcons	Riggs 2-yard touchdown run, Luckhurst kick good	14	10
2	1:21	—	—	—	49ers	Fumble recovery returned 34 yards for touchdown by Johnson, Wersching kick good	21	10
3	7:41				Falcons	Jackson 48-yard touchdown reception from Moroski, Luckhurst kick good	21	17
3	1:31	—	—	—	49ers	Interception returned 54 yards for touchdown by McLemore, Wersching kick good	28	17
4	9:01				49ers	Craig 5-yard touchdown run, Wersching kick good	35	17
"TOP" = time of possession. For other American football terms, see Glossary of American football.							35	17

- Point spread: 49ers by 13
- Over/under: 40.0 (over)
- Time of game:

49ers	Game statistics	Falcons
15	First downs	23
31–143	Rushes–yards	36–153
165	Passing yards	289
12–24–2	Passes	22–43–3
2–18	Sacked–yards	3–28
147	Net passing yards	261
290	Total yards	414
224	Return yards	112
5–39.6	Punts	4–40.8
1–1	Fumbles–lost	3–3
9–73	Penalties–yards	8–50
24:33	Time of Possession	35:27

=== Week 15 (Saturday, December 8, 1984): vs. Minnesota Vikings ===
Week 15: Minnesota Vikings at San Francisco 49ers – Game summary

Quarter	1	2	3	4	Total
Vikings (3–12)	0	7	0	0	7
49ers (14–1)	14	17	6	14	51

at Candlestick Park • San Francisco, California

- Date: December 8, 1984
- Game time: 1:00 p.m. PST
- Game weather: 53 °F (12 °C); wind 6 miles per hour (9.7 km/h; 5.2 kn)
- Game attendance: 56,670
- Referee: Gordon McCarter
- TV announcers (CBS): Frank Glieber (play-by-play) and Dick Vermeil (color commentator)

Team	Category	Player	Statistics
MIN	Passing	Wade Wilson	18/32, 212 YDS, 1 INTs
MIN	Rushing	Darrin Nelson	7 CAR, 38 YDS, 1 TD
MIN	Receiving	Joe Senser	6 REC, 36 YDS
SF	Passing	Joe Montana	15/21, 246 YDS, 3 TDs
SF	Rushing	Derrick Harmon	11 CAR, 56 YDS, 1 TD
SF	Receiving	Renaldo Nehemiah	6 REC, 125 YDS, 1 TD

Scoring summary

Quarter	Time	Drive			Team	Scoring information	Score	
Quarter	Time	Plays	Yards	TOP	Team	Scoring information	MIN	SF
1	6:44				49ers	Clark 44-yard touchdown reception from Montana, Wersching kick good	0	7
1	1:41				49ers	Solomon 3-yard touchdown reception from Montana, Wersching kick good	0	14
2	13:16				Vikings	Nelson 5-yard touchdown run, Stenerud kick good	7	14
2	9:12				49ers	Tyler 5-yard touchdown run, Wersching kick good	7	21
2	6:54				49ers	Nehemiah 59-yard touchdown reception from Montana, Wersching kick good	7	28
2	0:03				49ers	41-yard field goal by Wersching	7	31
3	9:47				49ers	25-yard field goal by Wersching	7	34
3	0:44				49ers	38-yard field goal by Wersching	7	37
4	10:08				49ers	Harmon 3-yard touchdown run, Wersching kick good	7	44
4	3:02				49ers	Ring 15-yard touchdown run, Wersching kick good	7	51
"TOP" = time of possession. For other American football terms, see Glossary of American football.							7	51

- Point spread: 49ers by 17
- Over/under: 44.0 (over)
- Time of game:

Vikings	Game statistics	49ers
18	First downs	29
24–90	Rushes–yards	40–184
233	Passing yards	346
21–39–1	Passes	25–35–0
6–58	Sacked–yards	1–9
175	Net passing yards	337
265	Total yards	521
203	Return yards	102
7–44.3	Punts	2–48.5
0–0	Fumbles–lost	1–0
7–65	Penalties–yards	4–25
26:41	Time of Possession	33:19

=== Week 16 (Friday, December 14, 1984): vs. Los Angeles Rams ===
Week 16: Los Angeles Rams at San Francisco 49ers – Game summary

Quarter	1	2	3	4	Total
Rams (10–6)	3	10	0	3	16
49ers (15–1)	14	3	0	2	19

at Candlestick Park • San Francisco, California

- Date: December 14, 1984
- Game time: 6:00 p.m. PST
- Game weather: 51 °F (11 °C); wind 13 miles per hour (21 km/h; 11 kn)
- Game attendance: 59,743
- Referee: Jerry Seeman
- TV announcers (ABC): Frank Gifford (play-by-play), Don Meredith (color commentator) and O. J. Simpson (color commentator)

Team	Category	Player	Statistics
RAM	Passing	Jeff Kemp	11/22, 180 YDS
RAM	Rushing	Eric Dickerson	26 CAR, 98 YDS, 1 TD
RAM	Receiving	Ron Brown	3 REC, 55 YDS
SF	Passing	Joe Montana	20/31, 219 YDS, 2 TDs
SF	Rushing	Roger Craig	8 CAR, 59 YDS
SF	Receiving	Earl Cooper	5 REC, 40 YDS, 1 TD

Scoring summary

Quarter	Time	Drive			Team	Scoring information	Score	
Quarter	Time	Plays	Yards	TOP	Team	Scoring information	RAM	SF
1	10:35				Rams	46-yard field goal by Lansford	3	0
2	8:14				49ers	Solomon 47-yard touchdown reception from Montana, Wersching kick good	3	7
1	0:58				49ers	Cooper 1-yard touchdown reception from Montana, Wersching kick good	3	14
2	14:05				49ers	38-yard field goal by Wersching	3	17
2	7:50				Rams	Dickerson 4-yard touchdown run, Lansford kick good	10	17
2	0:00				Rams	28-yard field goal by Lansford	13	17
4	4:43				Rams	42-yard field goal by Lansford	16	17
4	1:06	—	—	—	49ers	Kemp tackled in the end zone by Johnson for a safety	16	19
"TOP" = time of possession. For other American football terms, see Glossary of American football.							16	19

- Point spread: 49ers by 6
- Over/under: 44.0 (under)
- Time of game:

Rams	Game statistics	49ers
19	First downs	15
37–185	Rushes–yards	20–89
180	Passing yards	219
11–22–0	Passes	20–31–0
1–10	Sacked–yards	4–19
170	Net passing yards	200
355	Total yards	289
95	Return yards	88
4–37.8	Punts	6–44.5
2–1	Fumbles–lost	2–0
6–57	Penalties–yards	8–75
32:52	Time of Possession	27:08

== Standings ==
NFC West
	W	L	T	PCT	DIV	CONF	PF	PA	STK
^{(1)} San Francisco 49ers	15	1	0	.938	6–0	12–0	475	227	W9
^{(4)} Los Angeles Rams	10	6	0	.625	3–3	7–5	346	316	L1
New Orleans Saints	7	9	0	.438	1–5	4–8	298	361	W1
Atlanta Falcons	4	12	0	.250	2–4	3–9	281	382	W1

== Final statistics ==
=== Statistical comparison ===
	San Francisco 49ers	Opponents
First downs	356	302
First downs rushing	138	101
First downs passing	204	173
First downs penalty	14	28
Third down efficiency	96/207	75/213
Fourth down efficiency	5/7	6/21
Net yards rushing	2465	1795
Rushing attempts	534	432
Yards per rush	4.6	4.2
Passing – Completions/attempts	312/496	298/546
Times sacked–total yards	27–178	51–363
Interceptions thrown	10	25
Net yards passing	3901	3381
Total net yards	6366	5176
Punt returns–total yards	45–521	30–190
Kickoff returns–total yards	47–1039	78–1499
Interceptions–total return yards	25–345	10–155
Punts–average yardage	62–40.9	80–40.5
Fumbles–lost	26–12	36–13
Penalties–total yards	100–994	91–723
Time of possession	30:26	29:34
Turnovers	22	38

=== Quarter-by-quarter ===
49ers Quarter-by-quarter
	1	2	3	4	T
49ers	110	157	67	141	475
Opponents	29	86	48	64	227

=== Individual leaders ===
49ers Passing
C/ATT^{1}	Yds	TD	INT	Rating
49ers Rushing
Car^{2}	Yds	TD	LG^{3}	Yds/Car
49ers Receiving
Rec^{4}	Yds	TD	LG^{3}	Yds/Rec

49ers Interception
Int^{5}	Yds	TD	LG^{3}	Y/Int

49ers Sacks
Sk^{6}

49ers Punts
Pnt^{7}	Yds	LG^{3}	Blck	Y/P
49ers Kickoff Returns
Rt^{8}	Yds	TD	LG^{3}	Y/Rt
49ers Punt Returns
Rt^{9}	Yds	TD	LG^{3}	Y/Rt

49ers Extra Points
XP	XPA	XP%

49ers Field Goals
1–19	20–29	30–39	40–49	50+	FG	FGA	FG%

^{1}Completions/attempts ^{2}Carries ^{3}Long gain ^{4}Receptions ^{5}Interceptions ^{6}Sacks ^{7}Punts ^{8}Kickoff Returns ^{9}Punt Returns

== Playoffs ==
Round	Date	Opponent (seed)	Result	Record	Venue	Recap
Divisional	December 29	New York Giants (5)	W 21–10	1–0	Candlestick Park	Recap
NFC Championship	January 6, 1985	Chicago Bears (3)	W 23–0	2–0	Candlestick Park	Recap
Super Bowl XIX	January 20, 1985	Miami Dolphins (A1)	W 38–16	3–0	Stanford Stadium	Recap

=== 1984 NFC Divisional Playoffs (Saturday, December 29, 1984): vs. (5) New York Giants ===
Quarterback Joe Montana threw for 309 yards and 3 touchdown passes as he led the 49ers to a victory, while receiver Dwight Clark caught 9 passes for 112 yards and a touchdown.

NFC Divisional Playoff: New York Giants at San Francisco 49ers – Game summary

Quarter	1	2	3	4	Total
Giants (10–8)	0	10	0	0	10
49ers (16–1)	14	7	0	0	21

at Candlestick Park • San Francisco, California

- Date: December 29, 1984
- Game time: 1:00 p.m. PST
- Game weather: 43 °F (6 °C); wind 9 miles per hour (14 km/h; 7.8 kn)
- Game attendance: 60,303
- Referee: Gene Barth
- TV announcers (CBS): Pat Summerall (play-by-play), John Madden (color commentator) and Irv Cross (sideline reporter)

Team	Category	Player	Statistics
NYG	Passing	Phil Simms	25/44, 218 YDS, 2 INTs
NYG	Rushing	Joe Morris	17 CAR, 46 YDS
NYG	Receiving	Zeke Mowatt	5 REC, 49 YDS
SF	Passing	Joe Montana	25/39, 309 YDS, 3 TDs, 3 INTs
SF	Rushing	Joe Montana	3 CAR, 63 YDS
SF	Receiving	Dwight Clark	9 REC, 112 YDS, 1 TD

Scoring summary

Quarter	Time	Drive			Team	Scoring information	Score	
Quarter	Time	Plays	Yards	TOP	Team	Scoring information	NYG	SF
1	11:55				49ers	Clark 21-yard touchdown reception from Montana, Wersching kick good	0	7
1	8:12				49ers	Francis 9-yard touchdown reception from Montana, Wersching kick good	0	14
2	11:34				Giants	46-yard field goal by Haji-Sheikh	3	14
2	6:41	—	—	—	Giants	Interception returned 14 yards for touchdown by Carson, Haji-Sheikh kick good	10	14
2	4:09				49ers	Solomon 29-yard touchdown reception from Montana, Wersching kick good	10	21
"TOP" = time of possession. For other American football terms, see Glossary of American football.							10	21

- Point spread: 49ers by 12
- Over/under: 41.0 (under)
- Time of game:

Giants	Game statistics	49ers
18	First downs	22
25–87	Rushes–yards	28–131
218	Passing yards	309
25–44–2	Passes	25–39–3
6–45	Sacked–yards	4–28
173	Net passing yards	281
260	Total yards	412
178	Return yards	97
6–37.7	Punts	5–42.0
2–1	Fumbles–lost	0–0
2–25	Penalties–yards	5–29
31:29	Time of Possession	28:31

=== 1984 NFC Championship Game (Sunday, January 6, 1985): vs. (3) Chicago Bears ===
The 49ers passed for 236 yards while limiting the Bears to only 87 passing yards and no points.

NFC Championship Game: Chicago Bears at San Francisco 49ers

Quarter	1	2	3	4	Total
Bears (11–7)	0	0	0	0	0
49ers (17–1)	3	3	7	10	23

at Candlestick Park • San Francisco, California

- Date: January 6, 1985
- Game time: 1:00 p.m. PST
- Game weather: Drizzle, 52 °F (11 °C); wind 5 miles per hour (8.0 km/h; 4.3 kn)
- Game attendance: 61,040
- Referee: Jerry Seeman
- TV announcers (CBS): Pat Summerall (play-by-play), John Madden (color commentator) and Irv Cross (sideline reporter)

Team	Category	Player	Statistics
CHI	Passing	Steve Fuller	13/22, 87 YDS, 1 INT
CHI	Rushing	Walter Payton	22 CAR, 92 YDS
CHI	Receiving	Matt Suhey	4 REC, 11 YDS
SF	Passing	Joe Montana	18/34, 233 YDS, 1 TD, 2 INTs
SF	Rushing	Wendell Tyler	10 CAR, 68 YDS, 1 TD
SF	Receiving	Freddie Solomon	7 REC, 73 YDS, 1 TD

Scoring summary

Quarter	Time	Drive			Team	Scoring information	Score	
Quarter	Time	Plays	Yards	TOP	Team	Scoring information	CHI	SF
1	4:21				49ers	21-yard field goal by Wersching	0	3
2	7:57				49ers	22-yard field goal by Wersching	0	6
3	8:27				49ers	Tyler 9-yard touchdown run, Wersching kick good	0	13
4	12:15				49ers	Solomon 10-yard touchdown reception from Montana, Wersching kick good	0	20
4	1:56				49ers	34-yard field goal by Wersching	0	23
"TOP" = time of possession. For other American football terms, see Glossary of American football.							0	23

- Point spread: 49ers by 10
- Over/under: 40.0 (under)
- Time of game:

Bears	Game statistics	49ers
13	First downs	25
32–149	Rushes–yards	29–159
87	Passing yards	236
13–22–1	Passes	19–35–2
9–50	Sacked–yards	3–8
37	Net passing yards	228
186	Total yards	387
84	Return yards	84
7–43.1	Punts	3–39.0
1–0	Fumbles–lost	1–0
7–50	Penalties–yards	3–20
31:53	Time of Possession	28:07

=== Super Bowl XIX (Sunday, January 20, 1985): vs. (A1) Miami Dolphins ===
Super Bowl XIX: Miami Dolphins vs. San Francisco 49ers

Quarter	1	2	3	4	Total
Dolphins (16–3)	10	6	0	0	16
49ers (18–1)	7	21	10	0	38

at Stanford Stadium • Stanford, California

- Date: January 20, 1985
- Game time: 3:19 p.m. PST
- Game weather: 53 °F (12 °C), cloudy, fog for much of the second half
- Game attendance: 84,059
- Referee: Pat Haggerty
- TV announcers (ABC): Frank Gifford (play-by-play), Don Meredith (color commentator) and Joe Theismann (color commentator)

Team	Category	Player	Statistics
MIA	Passing	Dan Marino	29/50, 318 YDS, 1 TD, 3 INTs
MIA	Rushing	Tony Nathan	5 CAR, 18 YDS
MIA	Receiving	Tony Nathan	10 REC, 83 YDS
SF	Passing	Joe Montana	24/35, 331 YDS, 3 TDs
SF	Rushing	Wendell Tyler	13 CAR, 65 YDS
SF	Receiving	Roger Craig	7 REC, 77 YDS, 2 TDs

Scoring summary

Quarter	Time	Drive			Team	Scoring information	Score	
Quarter	Time	Plays	Yards	TOP	Team	Scoring information	MIA	SF
1	7:24	7	45	3:50	Dolphins	37-yard field goal by von Schamann	3	0
1	3:12	8	78	4:12	49ers	Monroe 33-yard touchdown reception from Montana, Wersching kick good	3	7
1	0:45	6	70	2:27	Dolphins	Johnson 2-yard touchdown reception from Marino, von Schamann kick good	10	7
2	11:34	4	47	1:25	49ers	Craig 8-yard touchdown reception from Montana, Wersching kick good	10	14
2	6:58	6	55	2:43	49ers	Montana 6-yard touchdown run, Wersching kick good	10	21
2	2:05	9	52	3:39	49ers	Craig 2-yard touchdown run, Wersching kick good	10	28
2	0:12	12	72	1:53	Dolphins	31-yard field goal by von Schamann	13	28
2	0:00	1	0	0:04	Dolphins	30-yard field goal by von Schamann	16	28
3	10:12	10	43	3:28	49ers	27-yard field goal by Wersching	16	31
3	6:18	5	70	2:20	49ers	Craig 16-yard touchdown reception from Montana, Wersching kick good	16	38
"TOP" = time of possession. For other American football terms, see Glossary of American football.							16	38

- Point spread: 49ers by 3
- Over/under: 53.5 (over)
- Time of game: 3 hours, 13 minutes

Dolphins	Game statistics	49ers
19	First downs	31
9–25	Rushes–yards	40–211
318	Passing yards	331
29–50–2	Passes	24–35–0
4–29	Sacked–yards	1–5
289	Net passing yards	326
314	Total yards	537
155	Return yards	91
6–39.3	Punts	3–32.7
1–0	Fumbles–lost	2–2
1–10	Penalties–yards	2–10
22:49	Time of Possession	37:11

== Awards and records ==
- Joe Montana, Super Bowl Most Valuable Player
- Joe Montana, All-Pro Selection
- Joe Montana, NFC Pro Bowl Selection

== 1985 AFC–NFC Pro Bowl ==
Number	Player	Position	Conference
51	Randy Cross	RG, Starter	NFC Pro Bowlers
71	Keith Fahnhorst	T	NFC Pro Bowlers
22	Dwight Hicks	FS, Starter	NFC Pro Bowlers
42	Ronnie Lott	LCB, Starter	NFC Pro Bowlers
16	Joe Montana	QB, Starter	NFC Pro Bowlers
55	Fred Quillan	C, Starter	NFC Pro Bowlers
58	Keena Turner	LB	NFC Pro Bowlers
26	Wendell Tyler	RB	NFC Pro Bowlers
27	Carlton Williamson	S	NFC Pro Bowlers
21	Eric Wright	CB	NFC Pro Bowlers

== Media ==
Pre season Local TV

Channel	Play-by-play	Color commentator(s)
KPIX-TV 5		

Local Radio

Flagship station	Play-by-play	Color commentator(s)	Sideline reporter(s)
KCBS–AM 740	Don Klein	Don Heinrich	
