= Ray Wersching =

Austrian gridiron football player (born 1950)

No. 15, 6, 14
- Position: Placekicker

Personal information
- Born: August 21, 1950 (age 76); Mondsee, Austria
- Listed height: 5 ft 11 in (1.80 m)
- Listed weight: 215 lb (98 kg)

Career information
- College: California
- NFL draft: 1973: undrafted

Career history
- San Diego Chargers (1973–1976); San Francisco 49ers (1977–1987)

Awards and highlights
- 2× Super Bowl champion (XVI, XIX); Second-team All-Pro (1986); NFL scoring leader (1984)

Career NFL statistics
- Field goals made: 222
- Field goal attempts: 329
- Field goal %: 67.5
- Stats at Pro Football Reference

Raimund "Ray" Wersching (born August 21, 1950) is an Austrian former professional American football player who was a placekicker for 15 seasons in the National Football League (NFL) from 1973 through 1987. He played college football for the California Golden Bears.

== Early career ==
He attended Warren High School in Downey, California.

== NFL career ==
Undrafted after his career at Cerritos College and the University of California, Berkeley, Wersching was signed by the San Diego Chargers, where he played for four years. In 1977, Wersching joined the San Francisco 49ers. In Super Bowl XVI, Wersching tied a Super Bowl record by kicking four field goals, and his field position kick-offs also helped his team win, 26–21. He won another Super Bowl ring with the 49ers in Super Bowl XIX, defeating the Miami Dolphins 38–16. When he retired, Wersching held 49ers records for points, field goals and extra points. He was the 12th player in NFL history to score 1,000 points in a career, and was the last player to have scored on a fair catch kick until 2024 by Cameron Dicker, also a kicker for the Chargers.

Wersching had a unique kicking style. Upon crossing the out of bound line onto the field to kick a field goal or extra point, he always looked down, tapped his quarterback on the shoulder to help him get his spot, and only looked at the hash marks, never raising his head until after he kicked.

== Career regular season statistics ==
Career high/best bold

Season	Team	G	FGM	FGA	%	LNG	XPM	XPA	%	PTS
1973	SD	14	11	25	44.0	39	13	15	86.7	46
1974	SD	14	5	11	45.5	42	–	–	–	15
1975	SD	14	12	24	50.0	45	20	21	95.2	56
1976	SD	9	4	8	50.0	45	14	16	87.5	26
1977	SF	10	10	17	58.8	50	23	23	100.0	53
1978	SF	16	15	23	65.2	45	24	25	96.0	69
1979	SF	16	20	24	83.3	47	32	35	91.4	95
1980	SF	16	15	19	78.9	47	33	39	84.6	78
1981	SF	12	17	23	73.9	48	30	30	100.0	81
1982	SF	9	12	17	70.6	45	23	25	92.0	59
1983	SF	16	25	30	83.3	52	51	51	100.0	126
1984	SF	16	25	35	71.4	53	56	56	100.0	131
1985	SF	16	13	21	61.9	45	52	53	98.1	91
1986	SF	16	25	35	71.4	50	41	42	97.6	116
1987	SF	12	13	17	76.5	45	44	46	95.7	83
Career		206	222	329	67.5	53	456	477	95.6	1,122

== Other ==
Wersching holds an inactive public accountant's license. He was a contestant on the original version of the game show High Rollers in 1975.

In 2006; Wersching along with business partner Mary Ann Locke were indicted on embezzlement charges of $8 million in insurance premiums. Wersching served six months in home confinement and was placed on probation for two years, the San Francisco Chronicle reported. When he pleaded guilty in December 2007 to failing to file a corporate tax return, federal prosecutors dropped charges that he had been involved in an $8 million embezzlement (while Locke served time in prison) but would lose his business as a result.
