= Wendell Tyler =

American football player (born 1955)

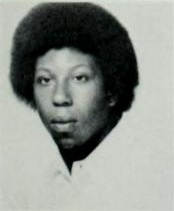

No. 26
- Position: Running back

Personal information
- Born: May 20, 1955 (age 71); Shreveport, Louisiana, U.S.
- Listed height: 5 ft 10 in (1.78 m)
- Listed weight: 198 lb (90 kg)

Career information
- High school: Crenshaw High School (Los Angeles, California)
- College: UCLA
- NFL draft: 1977: 3rd round, 79th overall pick

Career history
- Los Angeles Rams (1977–1982); San Francisco 49ers (1983–1986)

Awards and highlights
- Super Bowl champion (XIX); Pro Bowl (1984); 2× Second-team All-Pac-8 (1975, 1976)

Career NFL statistics
- Rushing attempts: 1,344
- Rushing yards: 6,378
- Rushing touchdowns: 50
- Stats at Pro Football Reference

Wendell Avery Tyler (born May 20, 1955) is an American former professional football player who was a running back in the National Football League (NFL). He was selected by the Los Angeles Rams in the third round of the 1977 NFL draft. A 5'10", 198 lbs. running back from UCLA, Tyler played in 10 NFL seasons from 1977 to 1986 for the Los Angeles Rams and San Francisco 49ers.

In 1979, he helped lead the Rams to Super Bowl XIV, where they were defeated 31–19 by the Pittsburgh Steelers. In 1984, he rushed for a 49er team record 1,262 yards during the regular season, and also caught 28 passes for 230 yards, was selected to the Pro Bowl, and played in Super Bowl XIX in which the 49ers defeated the Miami Dolphins 38–16. Tyler was the first player to lead two teams in rushing in two Super Bowls.

== College career ==
Tyler played running back at UCLA from 1973 to 1976 and is fifth in career rushing yards for the Bruins, with 3,240 yards. 1976 All-Conference and 3rd team All American, Tyler was on the 1975 UCLA team that won the Pacific-8 Conference and defeated number one ranked Ohio State in the Rose Bowl. He finished his college career with an average of 6 yards per carry and was inducted into the UCLA Athletics Hall of Fame in 2016.

== NFL career statistics ==
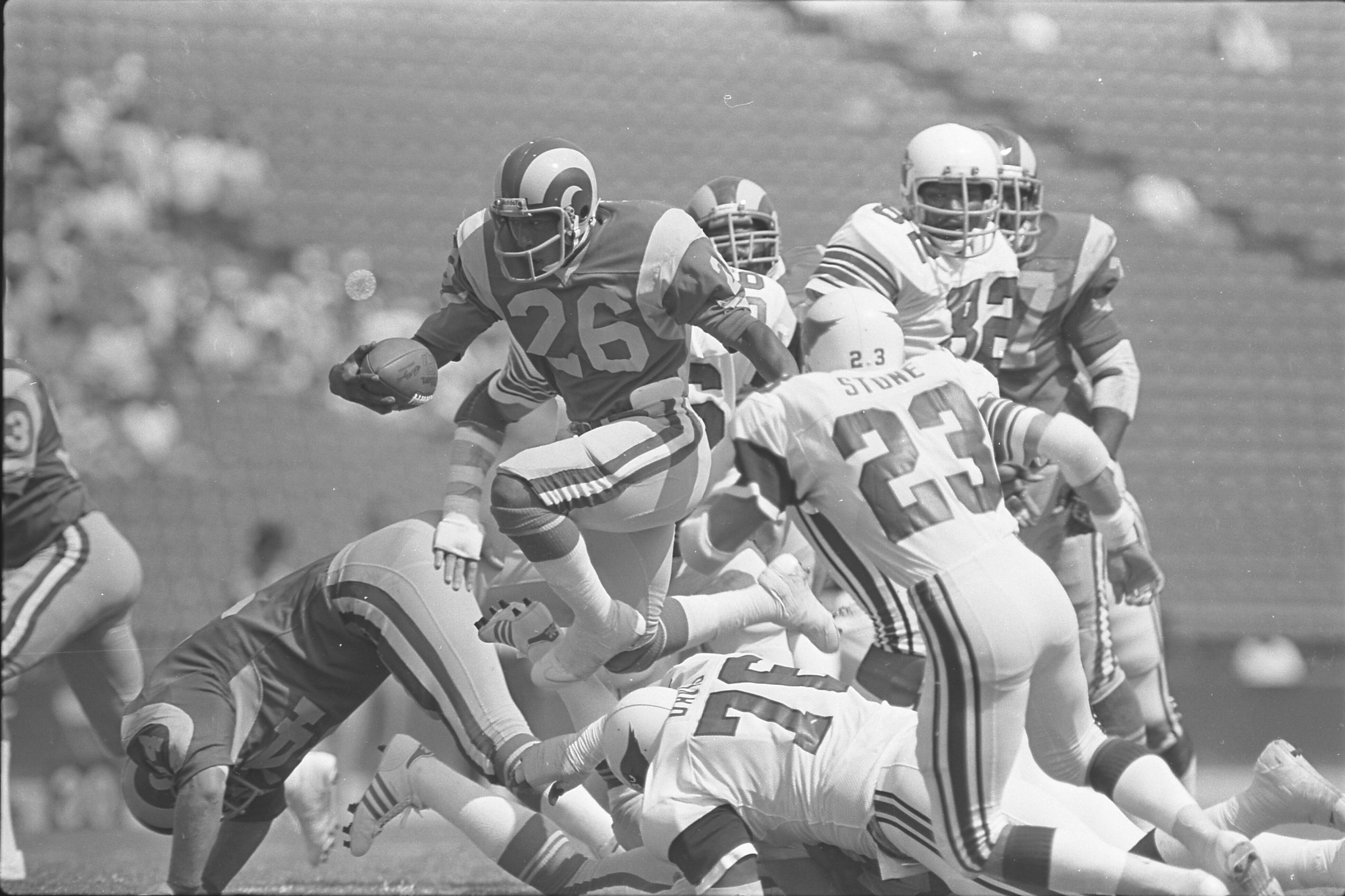
Tyler evading a tackle vs. the St. Louis Cardinals in 1979

Legend
	Won the Super Bowl
	Led the league
**Bold**	Career high

=== Regular season ===
Year	Team	Games		Rushing					Receiving				
Year	Team	GP	GS	Att	Yds	Avg	Lng	TD	Rec	Yds	Avg	Lng	TD
1977	RAM	14	0	61	317	**5.2**	44	3	1	3	3.0	3	0
1978	RAM	2	0	14	45	3.2	18	0	2	17	8.5	16	0
1979	RAM	**16**	12	218	1,109	5.1	63	9	32	308	9.6	**71**	1
1980	RAM	4	4	30	157	**5.2**	17	0	2	8	4.0	5	0
1981	RAM	15	**15**	**260**	1,074	4.1	**69**	**12**	**45**	**436**	9.7	67	**5**
1982	RAM	9	9	137	564	4.1	54	9	38	375	**9.9**	40	4
1983	SFO	14	14	176	856	4.9	39	4	34	285	8.4	26	2
1984	SFO	**16**	**15**	246	**1,262**	5.1	40	7	28	230	8.2	26	2
1985	SFO	13	12	171	867	5.1	30	6	20	154	7.7	16	2
1986	SFO	5	2	31	127	4.1	14	0	0	0	0.0	0	0
		108	83	1,344	6,378	4.7	69	50	202	1,816	9.0	71	16

=== Playoffs ===
Year	Team	Games		Rushing					Receiving				
Year	Team	GP	GS	Att	Yds	Avg	Lng	TD	Rec	Yds	Avg	Lng	TD
1977	RAM	1	0	1	0	0.0	0	0	0	0	0.0	0	0
1979	RAM	**3**	**3**	**64**	**228**	3.6	**39**	0	6	74	12.3	32	**1**
1983	SFO	2	2	25	118	4.7	11	**1**	3	32	10.7	17	0
1984	SFO	**3**	**3**	37	168	4.5	25	**1**	**8**	**118**	**14.8**	**40**	0
1985	SFO	1	0	10	61	**6.1**	14	0	0	0	0.0	0	0
		10	8	137	575	4.2	39	2	17	224	13.2	40	1

== Personal life ==
Tyler's son, Marc Tyler was rated by ESPN as the top high school running back in the United States graduating in 2007. Marc played football at powerhouse Oaks Christian High School in Westlake Village, California and played college football for the USC Trojans, the chief rival of his father's alma mater, UCLA.
