= Freddie Solomon =

American football player (1953–2012)

No. 86, 88
- Position: Wide receiver

Personal information
- Born: January 11, 1953; Sumter, South Carolina, U.S.
- Died: February 13, 2012 (aged 59); Tampa, Florida, U.S.
- Listed height: 5 ft 11 in (1.80 m)
- Listed weight: 185 lb (84 kg)

Career information
- High school: Sumter
- College: Tampa
- NFL draft: 1975: 2nd round, 36th overall pick

Career history
- Miami Dolphins (1975–1977); San Francisco 49ers (1978–1985)

Awards and highlights
- 2× Super Bowl champion (XVI, XIX); PFWA All-Rookie Team (1975); Second-team All-American (1974)

Career NFL statistics
- Receptions: 371
- Receiving yards: 5,846
- Rushing attempts: 61
- Rushing yards: 519
- Total touchdowns: 57
- Stats at Pro Football Reference

Freddie Solomon (January 11, 1953 – February 13, 2012) was an American professional football player who was a wide receiver in the National Football League (NFL). He was selected by the Miami Dolphins in the second round of the 1975 NFL draft. A native of Sumter, South Carolina, he was a graduate of Sumter High School class of 1971. A 5-foot-11, 184-pound receiver from the University of Tampa (where he had played quarterback), Solomon played in 11 NFL seasons for the Dolphins and San Francisco 49ers from 1975 to 1985. On December 5, 1976, Solomon had a career game, with 5 catches for 114 yards and a touchdown, 1 rushing attempt for 59 yards and a touchdown, and a punt return for 79 yards and a touchdown. Solomon won two Super Bowls with the 49ers, the first two in the history of the franchise.

On "The Catch", Dwight Clark's famous leaping grab that helped the 49ers beat the Dallas Cowboys in the 1982 NFC Playoffs, Solomon was the primary target on the play, but slipped coming out of his cut. Solomon made several key plays on the 49ers final drive of that game.

== Early life ==
Solomon played both basketball and football while attending Sumter High School. As the sixth man on his basketball team he scored two important baskets as the buzzer went off for half-time and third-quarter during a game against Howard in

In football, Solomon led his team to its first undefeated season and first South Carolina High School state football championship. In 1969, Soloman in a game against Howard High School scored the team's only points in a 74-yard kick-off return. His longest run that season was for 90 yards. In the 1970 Shrine Bowl, Soloman had 29 carries for 197 yards, and two touchdowns runs (22 & 41 yards). He was an honorary captain of the 1991 Shrine Bowl in Charlotte, NC.

== Legacy & awards ==
- Solomon was inducted into the Sumter Sports Hall of Fame
- South Carolina Sports Hall of Fame 2014 Class (posthumously)
- 1994 class of the Florida Sports Hall of Fame
- Two-time Super Bowl Champion

== Personal life ==
He was married to his wife Delilah for 33 years. After retiring from the NFL, Solomon worked for 20 years at the Hillsborough County Sheriff's Office. with a special youth program. Solomon's community engagement was extensive, spanning initiatives such as organizing Back to School events, Christmas programs, Family Fun Days, and Football Camps/Clinics, all aimed at supporting children and families. Solomon died on February 13, 2012, after a nine-month battle with colon and liver cancer.

== NFL career statistics ==
Legend
	Won the Super Bowl
	Led the league
**Bold**	Career high

=== Regular season ===
Year	Team	Games		Receiving				
Year	Team	GP	GS	Rec	Yds	Avg	Lng	TD
1975	MIA	14	5	22	339	15.4	58	2
1976	MIA	10	8	27	453	16.8	53	2
1977	MIA	13	6	12	181	15.1	54	1
1978	SFO	**16**	**15**	31	458	14.8	58	2
1979	SFO	15	11	57	807	14.2	44	7
1980	SFO	**16**	13	48	658	13.7	**93**	8
1981	SFO	15	**15**	**59**	**969**	16.4	60	8
1982	SFO	9	7	19	323	17.0	46	3
1983	SFO	13	11	31	662	**21.4**	77	4
1984	SFO	14	13	40	737	18.4	64	**10**
1985	SFO	**16**	12	25	259	10.4	39	1
Career		151	116	371	5,846	15.8	93	48

=== Playoffs ===
Year	Team	Games		Receiving				
Year	Team	GP	GS	Rec	Yds	Avg	Lng	TD
1981	SFO	**3**	2	**16**	**234**	14.6	58	**2**
1983	SFO	2	2	6	122	**20.3**	**76**	**2**
1984	SFO	**3**	**3**	12	181	15.1	29	**2**
1985	SFO	1	0	0	0	0.0	0	0
Career		9	7	34	537	15.8	76	6
