= Bryan Clark (American football) =

American football player (born 1960)

No. 11
- Position: Quarterback

Personal information
- Born: July 27, 1960 (age 66); Redwood City, California, U.S.
- Listed height: 6 ft 2 in (1.88 m)
- Listed weight: 198 lb (90 kg)

Career information
- High school: Los Altos (Los Altos, California)
- College: Michigan State
- NFL draft: 1982: 9th round, 251st overall pick

Career history
- San Francisco 49ers (1982–1984); Cincinnati Bengals (1984); Miami Dolphins (1985)*; Buffalo Bills (1986)*
- * Offseason or practice squad member only
- Stats at Pro Football Reference

Monte Bryan Clark (born July 27, 1960) is an American former professional football player who was a quarterback in the National Football League (NFL). He played college football for the Michigan State Spartans.

== College career ==
Clark was a member of the Michigan State Spartans for four seasons. He saw significant playing time as a sophomore, sharing starting duties with Bert Vaughn. As a senior he took over starting duties from John Leister and finished the season as the team's MVP after finishing third in the conference with a 128.9 passing efficiency rating, fourth with a 53.4% pass completion percentage and seventh with 1,521 passing yards with 14 touchdown passes and 10 interceptions. Clark finished his collegiate career with 2,725 yards on 204-for-409 passing with 20 touchdowns and 20 interceptions.

== Professional career ==
Clark was selected 251st overall by the San Francisco 49ers in the ninth round of the 1982 NFL draft. He broke his ankle in the 1982 preseason in a game against the St. Louis Cardinals and was placed on injured reserve for his rookie season. He suffered a separated shoulder in the 1983 preseason and was cut and re-signed by the 49ers several times during the 1983 season and was cut again at the end of training camp before the 1984 season. He was signed by the Cincinnati Bengals in December 1984 and he appeared in one game. He spent the 1985 preseason with the Miami Dolphins but was cut during training camp.

== Personal ==
Clark's father, Monte Clark, played and coached in the NFL and was the head coach of the 49ers and the Detroit Lions.
