= Tory Nixon =

American football player (born 1962)

No. 20
- Position: Cornerback

Personal information
- Born: February 24, 1962 (age 64); Eugene, Oregon, U.S.
- Listed height: 5 ft 11 in (1.80 m)
- Listed weight: 186 lb (84 kg)

Career information
- High school: Shadow Mountain (Phoenix, Arizona)
- College: San Diego State
- NFL draft: 1985: 2nd round, 33rd overall pick

Career history
- Washington Redskins (1985)*; San Francisco 49ers (1985–1988)
- * Offseason or practice squad member only

Awards and highlights
- Super Bowl champion (XXIII)

Career NFL statistics
- Interceptions: 3
- Fumble recoveries: 2
- Touchdowns: 1
- Stats at Pro Football Reference

Torran Blake Nixon (born February 24, 1962) is an American former professional football player who was a cornerback in the National Football League (NFL) for the San Francisco 49ers. He played college football for the San Diego State Aztecs and was selected 33rd overall in the second round of the 1985 NFL draft by the Washington Redskins.

In April 2019, Nixon was named President of Umpqua Bank. Previously, Nixon served as division president and managing director for California Bank & Trust in San Diego and Northern California. He also played for the San Francisco 49ers from 1985 to 1989 and was a member of the Super Bowl XXIII championship team over the Cincinnati Bengals. Nixon holds a Master of Business Administration from the University of Southern California.
