= Todd Shell =

American football player and coach (1962–2026)

No. 90
- Position: Linebacker

Personal information
- Born: June 24, 1962; Mesa, Arizona, U.S.
- Died: November 1, 2026 (aged 64); Mesa, Arizona, U.S.
- Listed height: 6 ft 4 in (1.93 m)
- Listed weight: 225 lb (102 kg)

Career information
- High school: Mountain View (Mesa)
- College: Brigham Young
- NFL draft: 1984: 1st round, 24th overall pick

Career history

Playing
- San Francisco 49ers (1984–1988)

Coaching
- San Jose SaberCats (1995–1998); New York Dragons (2003–2004); Arizona Rattlers (2005)

Awards and highlights
- 2× Super Bowl champion (XIX, XXIII); AFL Coach of the Year (2003); First-team All-WAC (1983)

Career NFL statistics
- Sacks: 7.0
- Interceptions: 5
- INT return yards: 115
- Touchdowns: 1
- Stats at Pro Football Reference

Head coaching record
- Regular season: 53–45 (.541)
- Postseason: 1–4 (.200)
- Career: 54–49 (.524)

Todd Andrew Shell (June 24, 1962 – November 1, 2026) was an American professional football player who was a linebacker for the San Francisco 49ers of the National Football League (NFL). He was also an Arena Football League (AFL) coach for the San Jose SaberCats, Arizona Rattlers and New York Dragons.

== Professional career ==
Shell was selected 24th overall by the San Francisco 49ers in the first round of the 1984 NFL draft. In Week 13 of the 1984 season, against the New Orleans Saints, Shell became the first NFL rookie to record 2.0+ sacks and an interception return touchdown (pick six) in a single game, when he returned an interception for 53 yards. As of 2026, only two other defenders, Andy Katzenmoyer and Devon Witherspoon, had achieved this feat.

== Death ==
Shell died on November 1, 2026, at the age of 64. He was interred at City of Mesa Cemetery.
