= Allan Kennedy =

Canadian gridiron football player (born 1958)

No. 66
- Position: Offensive tackle

Personal information
- Born: January 8, 1958 (age 68); Vancouver, British Columbia, Canada
- Listed height: 6 ft 7 in (2.01 m)
- Listed weight: 275 lb (125 kg)

Career information
- High school: El Camino Real (Los Angeles, California, U.S.)
- College: Washington State
- NFL draft: 1981: 10th round, 267th overall pick

Career history
- Washington Redskins (1981)*; San Francisco 49ers (1981–1984)
- * Offseason or practice squad member only

Awards and highlights
- 2× Super Bowl champion (XVI, XIX); First-team All-Pac-10 (1979)

Career NFL statistics
- Games played: 34
- Games started: 1
- Stats at Pro Football Reference

Allan Stephen Kennedy (born January 8, 1958) is a Canadian former professional American football player. He played offensive tackle for the San Francisco 49ers.

He grew up in Woodland Hills, California, where he attended El Camino Real High School. He then attended Washington State University to play football. In the 1981 NFL draft he was the 267th pick overall by the Washington Redskins. He was cut by the Redskins, but was signed by the 49ers. That year, he played three games. However, he didn't play in 1982. The next year, he played in every game, and in 1984, he only missed one game.
