= Fred Quillan =

American football player (1956–2016)

No. 56
- Position: Center

Personal information
- Born: January 27, 1956; West Palm Beach, Florida, U.S.
- Died: September 12, 2016 (aged 60); Portland, Oregon, U.S.
- Listed height: 6 ft 5 in (1.96 m)
- Listed weight: 261 lb (118 kg)

Career information
- High school: Central Catholic (Portland, Oregon)
- College: Oregon
- NFL draft: 1978: 7th round, 175th overall pick

Career history
- San Francisco 49ers (1978–1987); San Diego Chargers (1988)*
- * Offseason or practice squad member only

Awards and highlights
- 2× Super Bowl champion (XVI, XIX); 2× Pro Bowl (1984, 1985)

Career NFL statistics
- Games played: 143
- Games started: 129
- Fumble recoveries: 1
- Stats at Pro Football Reference

Frederick David Quillan (January 27, 1956 – September 12, 2016) was an American professional football player who was a center for the San Francisco 49ers of the National Football League (NFL) from 1978 through 1987. He appeared in two Super Bowls: Super Bowl XVI and Super Bowl XIX, winning both. He was a two-time Pro Bowl selection. Quillan played college football for the Oregon Ducks.
