= Bill Ring =

American football player (born 1956)

No. 30
- Position: Running back

Personal information
- Born: December 13, 1956 (age 69); Des Moines, Iowa, U.S.
- Listed height: 5 ft 10 in (1.78 m)
- Listed weight: 208 lb (94 kg)

Career information
- High school: Carlmont (Belmont, California)
- College: San Mateo, BYU
- NFL draft: 1980: undrafted

Career history
- Pittsburgh Steelers (1980)*; San Francisco 49ers (1981–1986)
- * Offseason or practice squad member only

Awards and highlights
- 2× Super Bowl champion (XVI, XIX)

Career NFL statistics
- Rushing yards: 732
- Rushing average: 4
- Rushing touchdowns: 7
- Receptions: 45
- Receiving yards: 336
- Receiving touchdowns: 1
- Stats at Pro Football Reference

William Thomas Ring (born December 13, 1956) is an American former professional football player who was a running back for six seasons with the San Francisco 49ers of the National Football League (NFL) from 1981 to 1986. He played college football for the College of San Mateo Bulldogs and the BYU Cougars.

Ring was a reserve and special teams player for the 49ers during the early success of the Bill Walsh era. Ring was considered a fan-favorite who was thought too small and too slow to be an NFL player but somehow found a way to hang on in the league for 6 years. He caught his first and only TD pass on December 6, 1981, against the Cincinnati Bengals at Riverfront Stadium, a game the 49ers won 21–3.

Ring currently resides in the San Francisco Bay Area with his wife, Connie, and their three children. His son, Billy is a former safety for the San Jose State Spartans.
