= Ron Ferrari =

American football player (born 1959)

No. 54
- Position: Linebacker

Personal information
- Born: July 30, 1959 (age 67); Springfield, Illinois, U.S.
- Listed height: 6 ft 0 in (1.83 m)
- Listed weight: 212 lb (96 kg)

Career information
- College: Illinois
- NFL draft: 1982: 7th round, 195th overall pick

Career history
- San Francisco 49ers (1982–1986)

Awards and highlights
- Super Bowl champion (XIX)

Career NFL statistics
- Sacks: 4
- Stats at Pro Football Reference

Ronald Lee Ferrari (born July 30, 1959) is an American former professional football player who was a linebacker for five seasons with the San Francisco 49ers of the National Football League (NFL). He played college football for the Illinois Fighting Illini.
