= 1982 New York Giants season =

NFL team season

- Owner: Wellington Mara
- General manager: George Young
- Head coach: Ray Perkins
- Home stadium: Giants Stadium

Results
- Record: 4–5
- Division place: 10th NFC (would have been 4th in the NFC East)
- Playoffs: Did not qualify
- Pro Bowlers: LB Lawrence Taylor; LB Harry Carson; CB Mark Haynes; P Dave Jennings

The 1982 New York Giants season was the franchise's 58th season in the National Football League, but was shortened to nine games due to the 1982 NFL Players Strike.

The season saw the Giants attempting to improve on a 9–7 record from 1981, a season in which they had made the playoffs for the first time since 1963 and also clinched their first winning record since 1972. However, the Giants stumbled out the gates early, starting 0–2 before the strike occurred. After the strike ended, the Giants won four of their last seven games, but missed the playoffs because of losing two tiebreakers against the Saints and the Lions (who both ended with identical 4–5 records). The Giants lost the tiebreakers based on best conference record. The Lions went 4–4 against NFC teams, while the Giants and Saints both went 3–5 against NFC teams. The Lions won the tiebreaker over the Saints, thus eliminating the Saints and Giants from playoff contention and putting the Lions into the playoffs as the final wild card spot in the NFC. This was the nineteenth season out of the last twenty that the Giants missed the playoffs.

== Offseason ==
=== NFL draft ===
Round	Pick	Player	Position	School
1	18	Butch Woolfolk	Running back	University of Michigan
2	45	Joe Morris	Running back	Syracuse University
3	–	–	–	–
4	102	Gerry Raymond	Guard	Boston College
5	129	Rich Umphrey	Center	Colorado
6	156	Darrell Nicholson	Linebacker	North Carolina
7	186	Jeff Wiska	Guard	Michigan State
8	213	Robert Hubble	Tight end	Rice
9	240	John Higgins	Defensive back	UNLV
10	270	Rich Baldinger	Tackle	Wake Forest
11	–	–	–	–
12	323	Mark Seale	Defensive tackle	Richmond

== Personnel ==
=== Staff ===
1982 New York Giants staff
Front office: President – Wellington Mara; General Manager – George Young; Director of Pro Personnel – Ernie Adams; Head coaches: Head Coach – Ray Perkins; Offensive coaches: Offensive Coordinator – Ron Erhardt; Offensive Backfield – Bob Lord; Receivers – Pat Hodgson; Offensive Line – Bill Austin	Defensive coaches: Defensive Coordinator – Bill Parcells; Defensive Line – Lamar Leachman; Linebackers – Bill Belichick; Defensive Backfield – Fred Glick; Special teams coaches: Special Teams – Romeo Crennel

=== Roster ===
1982 New York Giants roster
Quarterbacks (QB): 12 Scott Brunner; 8 Mark Reed; 17 Jeff Rutledge; Running backs (RB): 45 Leon Bright; 26 Rob Carpenter; 31 Clifford Chatman; 27 Larry Heater; 20 Joe Morris; 21 Butch Woolfolk; Wide receivers (WR): 88 Floyd Eddings; 83 Earnest Gray; 85 John Mistler; 82 Danny Pittman; Tight ends (TE): 81 Tom Mullady; 87 Gary Shirk	Offensive linemen (OL): 67 Billy Ard G; 74 Rich Baldinger T; 60 Brad Benson T; 66 Chris Foote C; 61 Ernie Hughes C; 72 Gordon King T; 65 John Tautolo G; 68 J. T. Turner G; 59 Rich Umphrey C; Defensive linemen (DL): 79 Dee Hardison DE; 70 Gary Jeter DE; 75 George Martin DE; 76 Curtis McGriff DE; 77 Bill Neill NT; 78 Jerome Sally NT; 80 Phil Tabor DE	Linebackers (LB): 53 Harry Carson ILB; 57 Byron Hunt OLB; 55 Brian Kelley ILB; 51 Frank Marion ILB; 52 Joe McLaughlin ILB; 56 Lawrence Taylor OLB; 10 Brad Van Pelt OLB; 58 Mike Whittington OLB; Defensive backs (DB): 22 Brian Carpenter CB; 29 Bill Currier SS; 46 Mike Dennis CB; 37 Larry Flowers FS; 36 Mark Haynes CB; 24 Terry Jackson CB; 28 Beasley Reece SS; 44 Pete Shaw SS; Special teams (ST): 18 Joe Danelo K; 13 Dave Jennings P	Reserve: 64 Jim Burt NT (IR); 63 Bruce Kimball G (IR); -- Dan Lloyd LB (IR); 54 Bill Matthews LB (IR); 39 Mike Mayock S (IR); -- Sylvester McGrew DE (IR); 86 Johnny Perkins WR (IR); -- Scott Phillips WR (IR); 69 Roy Simmons G (Ret.); 11 Phil Simms QB (IR); 73 Jeff Weston T (IR); -- Jeff Wiska G (IR); Rookies in italics

== Regular season ==
=== Schedule ===
Week	Date	Opponent	Result	Record	Venue	Attendance	Recap
1	September 12	Atlanta Falcons	**L** 14–16	0–1	Giants Stadium	74,286	Recap
2	September 20	Green Bay Packers	**L** 19–27	0–2	Giants Stadium	68,405	Recap
3	—N/a	at Pittsburgh Steelers	**Cancelled due to the 1982 NFL strike**				
4	—N/a	at **Dallas Cowboys**	**Cancelled due to the 1982 NFL strike**				
5	—N/a	**St. Louis Cardinals**	**Cancelled due to the 1982 NFL strike**				
6	—N/a	Cincinnati Bengals	**Cancelled due to the 1982 NFL strike**				
7	—N/a	at **Philadelphia Eagles**	Rescheduled to January 2				
8	—N/a	**Dallas Cowboys**	**Cancelled due to the 1982 NFL strike**				
9	—N/a	at Cleveland Browns	**Cancelled due to the 1982 NFL strike**				
10	—N/a	at Los Angeles Rams	**Cancelled due to the 1982 NFL strike**				
11	November 21	**Washington Redskins**	**L** 17–27	0–3	Giants Stadium	70,766	Recap
12	November 25	at Detroit Lions	**W** 13–6	1–3	Pontiac Silverdome	64,348	Recap
13	December 5	Houston Oilers	**W** 17–14	2–3	Giants Stadium	71,184	Recap
14	December 11	**Philadelphia Eagles**	**W** 23–7	3–3	Giants Stadium	66,053	Recap
15	December 19	at **Washington Redskins**	**L** 14–15	3–4	Robert F. Kennedy Memorial Stadium	50,030	Recap
16	December 26	at **St. Louis Cardinals**	**L** 21–24	3–5	Busch Stadium	39,824	Recap
17	January 2	at **Philadelphia Eagles**	**W** 26–24	4–5	Veterans Stadium	55,797	Recap

Note: Intra-division opponents are in bold text.

== Standings ==
NFC East
	W	L	T	PCT	DIV	CONF	PF	PA	STK
^{(1)} Washington Redskins	8	1	0	.889	6–1	8–1	190	128	W4
^{(2)} Dallas Cowboys	6	3	0	.667	2–1	4–2	226	145	L2
^{(6)} St. Louis Cardinals	5	4	0	.556	3–1	5–4	135	170	L1
New York Giants	4	5	0	.444	2–3	3–5	164	160	W1
Philadelphia Eagles	3	6	0	.333	1–5	1–5	191	195	L1

NFC
#	Team	W	L	T	PCT	PF	PA	STK
Seeded postseason qualifiers
1	Washington Redskins	8	1	0	.889	190	128	W4
2	Dallas Cowboys	6	3	0	.667	226	145	L2
3	Green Bay Packers	5	3	1	.611	226	169	L1
4 (Note: Minnesota (4–1), Atlanta (4–3), St. Louis (5–4), Tampa Bay (3–3) seeds were determined by best won-lost record in conference games.)	Minnesota Vikings	5	4	0	.556	187	198	W1
5	Atlanta Falcons	5	4	0	.556	183	199	L2
6	St. Louis Cardinals	5	4	0	.556	135	170	L1
7	Tampa Bay Buccaneers	5	4	0	.556	158	178	W3
8 (Note: Detroit finished ahead of New Orleans and the N.Y. Giants based on best conference record (4–4 to Saints’ 3–5 to Giants’ 3–5).)	Detroit Lions	4	5	0	.444	181	176	W1
Did not qualify for the postseason
9	New Orleans Saints	4	5	0	.444	129	160	W1
10	New York Giants	4	5	0	.444	164	160	W1
11 (Note: San Francisco finished ahead of Chicago, and Chicago finished ahead of Philadelphia, based on conference record (49ers’ 2–3 to Bears’ 2–5 to Eagles’ 1–5).)	San Francisco 49ers	3	6	0	.333	209	206	L1
12	Chicago Bears	3	6	0	.333	141	174	L1
13	Philadelphia Eagles	3	6	0	.333	191	195	L1
14	Los Angeles Rams	2	7	0	.222	200	250	W1
Tiebreakers

== Season summary ==
=== Week 12 at Lions ===
Week Twelve: New York Giants (0–3) at Detroit Lions (2–1)

Quarter	1	2	3	4	Total
Giants	0	0	6	7	13
Lions	3	3	0	0	6

at Pontiac Silverdome, Pontiac, Michigan

- Date: November 25, 1982
- Game time: 12:00 p.m. EST
- Game weather: Indoors (dome)
- TV announcers (CBS): Pat Summerall and John Madden
- Pro-Football-Reference.com

Game information

First quarter

- DET – Eddie Murray 46-yard field goal. Lions 3–0. Drive:

Second quarter

- DET – Eddie Murray 44-yard field goal. Lions 6–0. Drive:

Third quarter

- NYG – Joe Danelo 34-yard field goal. Lions 6–3. Drive:
- NYG – Joe Danelo 40-yard field goal. Tie 6–6. Drive:

Fourth quarter

- NYG – Lawrence Taylor 97-yard interception return (Joe Danelo kick). Giants 13–7.

Top passers

- NYG – Scott Brunner – 12/28, 136 yards, 2 INT
- DET – Gary Danielson – 12/19, 125 yards, 3 INT

Top rushers

- NYG – Butch Woolfolk – 21 rushes, 87 yards
- DET – Billy Sims – 26 rushes, 114 yards

Top receivers

- NYG – Johnny Perkins – 5 receptions, 80 yards
- DET – Mark Nichols – 3 receptions, 49 yards

=== Week 14 vs Eagles ===
Week Fourteen: New York Giants (2–3) at Philadelphia Eagles (1–4)

Quarter	1	2	3	4	Total
Eagles	7	0	0	0	7
Giants	3	14	3	3	23

at Giants Stadium, East Rutherford, New Jersey

- Date: December 11
- Game time: 12:30 p.m.
- Game weather: 35 °F (2 °C)
- Game attendance: 66,053
- Referee: Fred Silva
- TV announcers (CBS): Jack Buck play-by-play, Hank Stram color commentator
- Box Score

Game information

First quarter

- NYG – Joe Danelo 37-yard field goal. Giants 3–0. Drive:
- PHI – Harold Carmichael 23-yard pass from Ron Jaworski (Tony Franklin kick). Eagles 7–3. Drive:

Second quarter

- NYG – Butch Woolfolk 5-yard pass from Scott Brunner (Joe Danelo kick). Giants 10–7. Drive:
- NYG – Earnest Gray 16-yard pass from Scott Brunner (Joe Danelo kick). Giants 17–7. Drive:

Third quarter

- NYG – Joe Danelo 34-yard field goal. Giants 20–7. Drive:

Fourth quarter

- NYG – Joe Danelo 29-yard field goal. Giants 23–7. Drive:

Top passers

- PHI – Ron Jaworski – 17/29, 218 yards, TD, INT
- NYG – Scott Brunner – 17/26, 272 yards, 2 TD

Top rushers

- PHI – Wilbert Montgomery – 7 rushes, 23 yards
- NYG – Rob Carpenter – 26 rushes, 58 yards

Top receivers

- PHI – Harold Carmichael – 4 receptions, 57 yards, TD
- NYG – Floyd Eddings – 5 receptions, 148 yards

=== Week 17 at Eagles ===
Week Seventeen: New York Giants (3–5) at Philadelphia Eagles (3–5)

Quarter	1	2	3	4	Total
Giants	3	10	10	3	26
Eagles	7	7	0	10	24

at Veterans Stadium, Philadelphia, Pennsylvania

- Date: January 2, 1983
- Game time: 1:00 p.m.
- Game weather: 44 °F (7 °C)
- Referee: Red Cashion
- TV announcers (CBS): Pat Summerall play-by-play, John Madden color commentator
- Box Score

Ray Perkins last game as Giants head coach

== See also ==
- List of New York Giants seasons
