= 1981 New York Giants season =

NFL team season

- Owner: Timothy J. Mara; Wellington Mara
- General manager: George Young
- Head coach: Ray Perkins
- Defensive coordinator: Bill Parcells
- Home stadium: Giants Stadium

Results
- Record: 9–7
- Division place: 3rd NFC East
- Playoffs: Won Wild Card Playoffs (at Eagles) 27–21; Lost Divisional Playoffs (at 49ers) 24–38
- Pro Bowlers: LB Lawrence Taylor; LB Harry Carson

The 1981 New York Giants season was the franchise's 57th season in the National Football League. The Giants qualified for the playoffs for the first time in 18 years with a 9–7 record, which placed them third in the National Football Conference East Division. The Giants qualified for the postseason thanks to an overtime victory over the Dallas Cowboys in the last game of the season, coupled with a loss by the Green Bay Packers.

In the Wild Card playoff game, the Giants defeated the Philadelphia Eagles 27–21 at Philadelphia's Veterans Stadium. New York's season ended with a 38–24 loss to the San Francisco 49ers in the Divisional round. The 49ers would go on to win Super Bowl XVI.

== Offseason ==
=== NFL draft ===
The Giants drafted linebacker Lawrence Taylor from the University of North Carolina at Chapel Hill. Taylor would be inducted into the Pro Football Hall of Fame in 1999.

1981 New York Giants draft
Round	Pick	Player	Position	College	Notes
1	2	Lawrence Taylor * ^{†}	LB	North Carolina	
2	32	Dave Young	TE	Purdue	
3	59	John Mistler	WR	Arizona State	
4	85	Clifford Chatman	RB	Central State (OK)	Played during 1982 season
5	115	Bill Neill	DT	Pittsburgh	
6	145	Mel Hoover	WR	Arizona State	
6	165	Edward O'Neal	RB	Tuskegee	
7	168	Louis Jackson	RB	Cal Poly	
8	197	John Powers	G	Michigan	
8	207	Mark Reed	QB	Moorhead State	
8	221	Billy Ard	G	Wake Forest	
9	224	Byron Hunt	LB	SMU	
10	250	Mike Barber	DT	Grambling State	
12	307	Mike Maher	TE	Western Illinois	
Made roster † Pro Football Hall of Fame * Made at least one Pro Bowl during career

=== Undrafted free agents ===
1981 undrafted free agents of note
Player	Position	College
Jim Burt	Defensive tackle	Miami (FL)
Bob Ireland	Defensive back	Holy Cross

== Personnel ==
=== Staff ===
1981 New York Giants staff
Front office: President – Wellington Mara; General Manager – George Young; Director of Pro Personnel – Jim Trimble; Head coaches: Head Coach – Ray Perkins; Offensive coaches: Offensive Backfield – Bob Lord; Receivers – Pat Hodgson; Offensive Line – Bill Austin; Offensive Assistant – Ernie Adams	Defensive coaches: Defensive Coordinator – Bill Parcells; Defensive Line – Lamar Leachman; Linebackers – Bill Belichick; Defensive Backfield – Fred Glick; Special teams coaches: Special Teams – Romeo Crennel

=== Roster ===
1981 New York Giants roster
Quarterbacks (QB): 12 Scott Brunner; 15 Cliff Olander; Running backs (RB): 45 Leon Bright; 26 Rob Carpenter; 35 Ike Forte; 21 Louis Jackson; 30 Leon Perry; Wide receivers (WR): 88 Mike Friede; 83 Earnest Gray; 85 John Mistler; 86 Johnny Perkins; 82 Danny Pittman; Tight ends (TE): 81 Tom Mullady; 87 Gary Shirk; 89 Dave Young	Offensive linemen (OL): 67 Billy Ard G; 60 Brad Benson T; 50 Jim Clack C; 72 Gordon King T; 59 Ed McGlasson C; 69 Roy Simmons G; 68 J. T. Turner G; 73 Jeff Weston T; Defensive linemen (DL): 64 Jim Burt NT; 79 Dee Hardison DE; 70 Gary Jeter DE; 75 George Martin DE; 77 Bill Neill NT; 80 Phil Tabor DE	Linebackers (LB): 53 Harry Carson ILB; 57 Byron Hunt OLB; 55 Brian Kelley ILB; 51 Frank Marion ILB; 52 Joe McLaughlin ILB; 56 Lawrence Taylor OLB; 10 Brad Van Pelt OLB; 58 Mike Whittington OLB; Defensive backs (DB): 29 Bill Currier SS; 46 Mike Dennis CB; 37 Larry Flowers SS; 36 Mark Haynes CB; 24 Terry Jackson CB; 28 Beasley Reece FS; Special teams (ST): 18 Joe Danelo K; 13 Dave Jennings P	Reserve: -- Clifford Chatman RB (IR); 27 Larry Heater RB (IR); 61 Ernie Hughes C (IR); -- Dennis Johnson TE (IR); -- Bruce Kimball G (IR); 44 Doug Kotar RB (IR); 71 Myron Lapka NT (IR); 54 Dan Lloyd LB (NF-Ill.); 76 Curtis McGriff DE (IR); 8 Mark Reed QB (IR); 11 Phil Simms QB (IR); 65 John Sinnott T (IR); -- Mark Slawson WR (IR); 99 Kervin Wyatt LB (IR); Rookies in italics

== Preseason ==
Week	Date	Opponent	Result	Record	Venue	Attendance
1	August 8	at Chicago Bears	W 23–7	1–0	Soldier Field	59,411
2	August 15	Baltimore Colts	W 20–17	2–0	Giants Stadium	40,716
3	August 22	New York Jets	L 24–37	2–1	Giants Stadium	74,692
4	August 29	at Pittsburgh Steelers	L 6–31	2–2	Three Rivers Stadium	51,311

== Schedule ==
Week	Date	Opponent	Result	Record	Venue	Attendance	Recap
1	September 6	**Philadelphia Eagles**	**L** 10–24	0–1	Giants Stadium	72,459	Recap
2	September 13	at **Washington Redskins**	**W** 17–7	1–1	RFK Stadium	53,343	Recap
3	September 20	New Orleans Saints	**W** 20–7	2–1	Giants Stadium	69,814	Recap
4	September 27	at **Dallas Cowboys**	**L** 10–18	2–2	Texas Stadium	63,449	Recap
5	October 4	Green Bay Packers	**L** 14–27	2–3	Giants Stadium	73,684	Recap
6	October 11	**St. Louis Cardinals**	**W** 34–14	3–3	Giants Stadium	67,128	Recap
7	October 18	at Seattle Seahawks	**W** 32–0	4–3	Kingdome	56,134	Recap
8	October 25	at Atlanta Falcons	**W** 27–24	5–3	Atlanta–Fulton County Stadium	48,410	Recap
9	November 1	New York Jets	**L** 7–26	5–4	Giants Stadium	74,740	Recap
10	November 8	at Green Bay Packers	**L** 24–26	5–5	Milwaukee County Stadium	54,138	Recap
11	November 15	**Washington Redskins**	**L** 27–30	5–6	Giants Stadium	63,133	Recap
12	November 22	at **Philadelphia Eagles**	**W** 20–10	6–6	Veterans Stadium	66,827	Recap
13	November 29	at San Francisco 49ers	**L** 10–17	6–7	Candlestick Park	57,186	Recap
14	December 6	Los Angeles Rams	**W** 10–7	7–7	Giants Stadium	59,659	Recap
15	December 13	at **St. Louis Cardinals**	**W** 20–10	8–7	Busch Memorial Stadium	47,358	Recap
16	December 19	**Dallas Cowboys**	**W** 13–10	9–7	Giants Stadium	73,009	Recap
Note: Intra-division opponents are in **bold** text.

== Game summaries ==
=== Week 12 ===
Team	1	2	3	4	Total
• Giants	3	7	0	10	20
Eagles	7	3	0	0	10

- Date: November 22
- Location: Veterans Stadium, Philadelphia, Pennsylvania
- Game start: 1:00 p.m.
- Game weather: 39 °F (3.9 °C), wind 16 miles per hour (26 km/h; 14 kn)
- Referee: Jim Tunney
- TV announcers (CBS): Pat Summerall and John Madden

Scoring summary
1	NYG	Joe Danelo 39 yard field goal	Giants 3–0
1	PHI	Keith Krepfle 6 yard pass from Ron Jaworski (Tony Franklin kick)	Eagles 7–3
2	NYG	Leon Bright 1 yard rush (Joe Danelo kick)	Giants 10–3
2	PHI	Tony Franklin 27 yard field goal	Eagles 10–10
4	NYG	Joe Danelo 30 yard field goal	Giants 13–10
4	NYG	Terry Jackson 32 yard interception return (Joe Danelo kick)	Giants 20–10

This was the Giants' first win over the Eagles since 1975.

=== Week 13 ===
Team	1	2	3	4	Total
Giants	0	3	0	7	10
• 49ers	7	7	0	3	17

- Date: November 29
- Location: Candlestick Park, San Francisco, California
- Game start: 4:00 p.m.
- Game weather: 49 °F (9.4 °C), wind 10 miles per hour (16 km/h; 8.7 kn)
- Referee: Jerry Markbreit
- TV announcers (CBS): Tim Ryan and Fred Dryer

Scoring summary
1	SF	Johnny Davis 1 yard rush (Ray Wersching kick)	49ers 7–0
2	SF	Joe Montana 20 yard rush (Ray Wersching kick)	49ers 14–0
2	NYG	Joe Danelo 52 yard field goal	49ers 14–3
4	NYG	Rob Carpenter 3 yard run (Joe Danelo kick)	49ers 14–10
4	SF	Ray Wersching 23 yard field goal	49ers 17–10

=== Week 14 ===
Team	1	2	3	4	Total
Rams	7	0	0	0	7
• Giants	0	0	7	3	10

- Date: December 6
- Location: Giants Stadium, East Rutherford, New Jersey
- Game start: 1:00 p.m. EST
- Game weather: 36 °F (2.2 °C), wind 28 miles per hour (45 km/h; 24 kn)
- Referee: Fred Silva
- TV announcers (CBS): Pat Summerall and John Madden

Scoring summary
1	LAR	Wendell Tyler 2 yard rush Scott Brunner (Frank Corrall kick)	Rams 7–0
3	NYG	Rob Carpenter 1 yard rush (Joe Danelo kick)	Tie 7–7
4	NYG	Joe Danelo 19 yard field goal	Giants 10–7

=== Week 15 ===
Team	1	2	3	4	Total
• Giants	7	3	7	3	20
Cardinals	3	0	0	7	10

- Date: December 13
- Location: Busch Stadium, St. Louis, Missouri
- Game start: 12:00 p.m.
- Game weather: 32 °F (0 °C), wind 6 miles per hour (9.7 km/h; 5.2 kn)
- Referee: Gordon McCarter
- TV announcers (CBS): Tom Brookshier and Roger Staubach

Scoring summary
1	STL	Neil O'Donoghue 30 yard field goal	Cardinals 3–0
1	NYG	George Martin 20 yard fumble return (Joe Danelo kick)	Giants 7–3
2	NYG	Joe Danelo 27 yard field goal	Giants 10–3
3	NYG	Rob Carpenter 1 yard run (Joe Danelo kick)	Giants 17–3
4	NYG	Joe Danelo 33 yard field goal	Giants 20–3
4	STL	Greg LaFleur 3 yard pass from Neil Lomax (Neil O'Donoghue kick)	Giants 20–10

=== Week 16: vs. Dallas Cowboys ===
Week 16: Dallas Cowboys at New York Giants

Quarter	1	2	3	4	OT	Total
Cowboys	0	0	0	10	0	10
Giants	0	0	7	3	3	13

at Giants Stadium, East Rutherford, New Jersey

- Date: December 19, 1981
- Game time: 12:30 p.m.
- Game weather: 26 °F (−3 °C)
- Referee: Pat Haggerty
- TV announcers (CBS): Pat Summerall and John Madden
- Pro-Football-Reference.com

Game information

First quarter

- No scoring plays.

Second quarter

- No scoring plays.

Third quarter

- NYG – Tom Mullady 20 yard pass from Scott Brunner (Joe Danelo kick). Giants 7–0.

Fourth quarter

- DAL – Doug Cosbie 3 yard pass from Danny White (Rafael Septién kick). Tie 7–7.
- DAL – Rafael Septién 36 yard field goal. Cowboys 10–7.
- NYG – Joe Danelo 40 yard field goal. Tie 10–10.

Overtime

- NYG – Joe Danelo 35 yard field goal. Giants 13–10.

Top passers

- DAL – Danny White – 17/33, 200 yards, 1 TD, 1 INT
- NYG – Scott Brunner – 13/27, 163 yards, 1 TD, 1 INT

Top rushers

- DAL – Tony Dorsett – 20 rushes, 39 yards
- NYG – Rob Carpenter – 29 rushes, 83 yards

Top receivers

- DAL – Billy Joe DuPree – 3 receptions, 44 yards
- NYG – John Mistler – 3 receptions, 37 yards

Heading into their last regular season game, the Giants needed a win over the Dallas Cowboys to remain in postseason contention. Dallas, the NFC East champions, required a victory against New York, along with a loss by the San Francisco 49ers, to clinch home-field advantage in the NFC playoffs. Neither team scored in the first half; Giants kicker Joe Danelo missed two field goal attempts from inside 30 yards in the first quarter. The Giants opened the scoring during their second possession of the second half, as Scott Brunner completed a 20-yard touchdown pass to Tom Mullady. On the final play of the third quarter, Dallas wide receiver Tony Hill caught a 44-yard pass from Danny White; three plays later, White threw a touchdown pass to Doug Cosbie, which allowed the Cowboys to tie the game, 7–7. On the Giants' next drive, Brunner threw an interception to Michael Downs; after taking possession in Giants territory, the Cowboys went in front on a 36-yard field goal by Rafael Septién.

Dallas held a three-point lead into the closing minutes of the fourth quarter, when a Tony Dorsett fumble gave the Giants the ball at the Cowboys' 45-yard-line. Inside the final minute, Danelo attempted a game-tying field goal from 40 yards. His kick was good, and the game was forced into overtime. The Giants had the first possession of overtime after winning the coin toss, but were forced to punt. On the Cowboys' second play of their first overtime drive, Dorsett was unable to field a pitch by White; Lawrence Taylor recovered the fumble and the Giants gained possession at the Dallas 40-yard-line. Danelo's ensuing 33-yard field goal attempt was unsuccessful, hitting an upright. The Giants then forced another Cowboys turnover, as White was intercepted by Byron Hunt, who returned the ball to the Dallas 24-yard-line. Danelo was called on again, and his 35-yard field goal clinched a 13–10 victory for the Giants. The following day, the New York Jets defeated the Green Bay Packers, giving the Giants their first playoff berth since 1963.

== Playoffs ==
Round	Date	Opponent (seed)	Result	Venue	Attendance	Recap
Wildcard	December 27	at Philadelphia Eagles (4)	W 27–21	Veterans Stadium	71,611	Recap
Divisional	January 3, 1982	at San Francisco 49ers (1)	L 24–38	Candlestick Park	58,360	Recap

== Standings ==
NFC East
	W	L	T	PCT	DIV	CONF	PF	PA	STK
^{(2)} Dallas Cowboys	12	4	0	.750	6–2	8–4	367	277	L1
^{(4)} Philadelphia Eagles	10	6	0	.625	4–4	7–5	368	221	W1
^{(5)} New York Giants	9	7	0	.563	5–3	8–6	295	257	W3
Washington Redskins	8	8	0	.500	3–5	6–6	347	349	W3
St. Louis Cardinals	7	9	0	.438	2–6	4–8	315	408	L2
