= 1981–82 NFL playoffs =

American football tournament

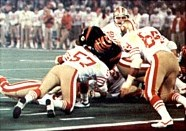
- The 49ers playing against the Bengals in Super Bowl XVI
- Dates: December 27, 1981–January 24, 1982
- Season: 1981
- Teams: 10
- Games played: 9
- Super Bowl XVI site: Pontiac Silverdome; Pontiac, Michigan
- Defending champions: Oakland Raiders (did not qualify)
- Champion: San Francisco 49ers (1st title)
- Runner-up: Cincinnati Bengals
- Conference runners-up: Dallas Cowboys; San Diego Chargers
NFL playoffs
← 1980–81	1982–83 →

The National Football League playoffs for the 1981 season began on December 27, 1981. The postseason tournament concluded with the San Francisco 49ers defeating the Cincinnati Bengals in Super Bowl XVI, 26–21, on January 24, 1982, at the Pontiac Silverdome in Pontiac, Michigan.

Both conference champions had losing records the previous season, the only time this has happened. All four AFC playoff games were between teams who had never faced each other in the postseason before. This was the only time this happened in either conference since the playoffs were expanded to 10 teams in 1978.

This also marked the first time that the AFC playoff participants consisted only of teams that originated in the original AFL. Previous editions of the playoffs since the merger had included either the Steelers, Colts and/or Browns, each of whom joined the AFC in 1970 after beginning as an NFL team pre-merger.

This was also the first year that both New York City area teams, the Giants and the Jets, made the playoffs together in the same year. The Giants qualified for the first time since 1963, and the Jets for the first time since 1969.

== Participants ==
Within each conference, the three division winners and the two non-division winners with the best overall regular season records qualified for the playoffs. The NFL did not use a fixed-bracket playoff system. The three division winners were seeded 1–3 based on their overall won-lost-tied record, and received a first-round bye while the wild card teams were seeded 4 and 5, and played in the first round, dubbed the wild-card playoffs or wild-card weekend, with the 4 seed hosting. The second round, the divisional playoffs, had a restriction where two teams from the same division could not meet: the surviving wild card team visited the division champion outside its division that had the higher seed, and the remaining two teams from that conference played each other. The two surviving teams from each conference's divisional playoff games then met in the respective AFC and NFC Conference Championship games, hosted by the higher seed. Finally the Super Bowl, the championship round of the playoffs, was played at a neutral site, with the designated home team based on an annual rotation by conference.

Playoff seeds
Seed	AFC	NFC
1	Cincinnati Bengals (Central winner)	San Francisco 49ers (West winner)
2	Miami Dolphins (East winner)	Dallas Cowboys (East winner)
3	San Diego Chargers (West winner)	Tampa Bay Buccaneers (Central winner)
4	New York Jets (wild card)	Philadelphia Eagles (wild card)
5	Buffalo Bills (wild card)	New York Giants (wild card)

== Bracket ==
Jan 2 – Texas Stadium
3	Tampa Bay	0
Dec 27 – Veterans Stadium	Jan 10 – Candlestick Park
2	Dallas	38
NFC
5	NY Giants	27	2	Dallas	27
Jan 3 – Candlestick Park
4	Philadelphia	21	1	San Francisco	28
NFC Championship
5	NY Giants	24
Jan 24 – Pontiac Silverdome
1	San Francisco	38
Divisional playoffs
Wild Card playoffs	N1	San Francisco	26
Jan 2 – Miami Orange Bowl
A1	Cincinnati	21
Super Bowl XVI
3	San Diego	41*
Dec 27 – Shea Stadium	Jan 10 – Riverfront Stadium
2	Miami	38
AFC
5	Buffalo	31	3	San Diego	7
Jan 3 – Riverfront Stadium
4	NY Jets	27	1	Cincinnati	27
AFC Championship
5	Buffalo	21
1	Cincinnati	28

* Indicates overtime victory

== Schedule ==
In the United States, NBC broadcast the AFC playoff games, while CBS televised the NFC games and Super Bowl XVI.

This was last season that local times were considered in scheduling afternoon playoff games for the first three rounds, and not strictly in the 12:30 p.m. and 4:00 p.m. EST time slots.

Round	Away team	Score	Home team	Date	Kickoff (ET / UTC−5)	TV
Wild-card round	Buffalo Bills	31–27	New York Jets	December 27, 1981	12:00 p.m.	NBC
Wild-card round	New York Giants	27–21	Philadelphia Eagles	December 27, 1981	3:30 p.m.	CBS
Divisional round	Tampa Bay Buccaneers	0–38	Dallas Cowboys	January 2, 1982	1:00 p.m.	CBS
Divisional round	San Diego Chargers	41–38 (OT)	Miami Dolphins	January 2, 1982	5:00 p.m.	NBC
Divisional round	Buffalo Bills	21–28	Cincinnati Bengals	January 3, 1982	1:00 p.m.	NBC
Divisional round	New York Giants	24–38	San Francisco 49ers	January 3, 1982	5:00 p.m.	CBS
Conference championships	San Diego Chargers	7–27	Cincinnati Bengals	January 10, 1982	1:00 p.m.	NBC
Conference championships	Dallas Cowboys	27–28	San Francisco 49ers	January 10, 1982	4:30 p.m.	CBS
Super Bowl XVI Pontiac Silverdome Pontiac, Michigan	San Francisco 49ers	26–21	Cincinnati Bengals	January 24, 1982	4:20 p.m.	CBS

== Wild-card round ==
=== Sunday, December 27, 1981 ===
==== AFC: Buffalo Bills 31, New York Jets 27 ====
Buffalo Bills vs. New York Jets – Game summary

Quarter	1	2	3	4	Total
Bills	17	7	0	7	31
Jets	0	10	3	14	27

at Shea Stadium, Flushing, Queens, New York

- Game time: 12:00 p.m. EST
- Game weather: 35 °F (2 °C), drizzle
- Game attendance: 57,050
- Referee: Bob McElwee
- TV announcers (NBC): Charlie Jones (play-by-play) and Len Dawson (color commentator)

Game information

First quarter

- BUF – Charles Romes 26-yard kickoff fumble return (Nick Mike-Mayer kick). Bills 7–0.
- BUF – Frank Lewis 50-yard pass from Joe Ferguson (Nick Mike-Mayer kick). Bills 14–0.
- BUF – Nick Mike-Mayer 29-yard field goal. Bills 17–0.

Second quarter

- BUF – Frank Lewis 26-yard pass from Joe Ferguson (Nick Mike-Mayer kick). Bills 24–0.
- NYJ – Mickey Shuler 30-yard pass from Richard Todd (Pat Leahy kick). Bills 24–7.
- NYJ – Pat Leahy 26-yard field goal. Bills 24–10.

Third quarter

- NYJ – Pat Leahy 19-yard field goal. Bills 24–13.

Fourth quarter

- BUF – Joe Cribbs 45-yard run (Nick Mike-Mayer kick). Bills 31–13.
- NYJ – Bobby Jones 30-yard pass from Richard Todd (Pat Leahy kick). Bills 31–20.
- NYJ – Kevin Long 1-yard run (Pat Leahy kick). Bills 31–27.

Top passers

- BUF – Joe Ferguson – 17/34, 268 yards, 2 TD, 4 INT
- NYJ – Richard Todd – 28/51, 377 yards, 2 TD, 4 INT

Top rushers

- BUF – Joe Cribbs – 15 rushes, 83 yards, TD
- NYJ – Freeman McNeil – 12 rushes, 32 yards

Top receivers

- BUF – Frank Lewis – 7 receptions, 158 yards, 2 TD
- NYJ – Mickey Shuler – 6 receptions, 116 yards, TD

Bill Simpson's interception at the Buffalo 1-yard line with two seconds left in the game preserved a 31–27 victory and gave Buffalo its first playoff win since 1965. This would also turn out to be the final NFL playoff game at Shea Stadium, as the Jets moved to Giants Stadium three years later.

The Bills jumped to a 24–0 lead by the second quarter against a Jets defense that had only given up 37 first quarter points all season. First New York's Bruce Harper fumbled the opening kickoff while being tackled by Ervin Parker, and Charles Romes returned the ball 26-yards to the end zone. After a few punts, New York had a great chance to respond when Richard Todd completed a 37-yard pass to tight end Jerome Barkum on the Bills 30-yard line. On the next play, receiver Wesley Walker broke open in the end zone and Todd threw him the ball, only to watch it go right through Walker's hands. The next two plays resulted in the team being pushed back to the 35, where Pat Leahy missed a 52-yard field goal attempt. Then Buffalo drove 66 yards in three plays to score on quarterback Joe Ferguson's 50-yard touchdown pass to wide receiver Frank Lewis. On the Jets next drive, Rufus Bess intercepted a pass from Todd and returned it 49 yards to the New York 12, leading to a 29-yard field goal by Nick Mike-Mayer.

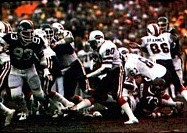
Bills' running back Joe Cribbs (middle) rushes the ball against the Jets in the 1981 AFC wild card game.

Now down 17–0, New York had a good chance to get back in the game when Mark Gastineau forced a fumble from Ferguson on the Bills next drive. Gastineau got to the ball before anyone else, but wound up accidentally knocking the ball forward twice while trying to pick it up, and Buffalo lineman Ken Jones ended up recovering it. Following a missed 37-yard field goal attempt by Mike-Mayer after the fumble recovery, Todd led the Jets to the Bills 38-yard line, only to throw another interception, this one to linebacker Phil Villapiano, who returned it 18 yards to the 40. The Bills converted this turnover into a 24–0 lead as Ferguson completed a 28-yard pass to running back Joe Cribbs before hooking up with Lewis for a 26-yard scoring completion. However, New York got a big boost from receiver Kurt Sohn, who returned the kickoff 28 yards to the 48-yard line. From there, Todd led the team 52 yards in five plays to score on his 30-yard touchdown pass to tight end Mickey Shuler, Shuler's first reception of the season. After a pair of punts, Greg Buttle returned an interception from Ferguson 29 yards to the Bills 14-yard line, setting up's Leahy's 26-yard field goal that cut the score to 24–10 at the end of the half.

Buttle intercepted another pass from Ferguson on the opening drive of the third quarter, returning this one 11 yards to the Bills 44. The Jets took advantage again with another Leahy field goal to bring the team within 11 points at 24–13. Then Ferguson threw his third consecutive interception on the next drive, which Donald Dykes picked off and returned 22 yards, giving New York a first down on the Buffalo 35. But this time the Jets could not take advantage, as Simpson put an end to the next drive with an interception of his own.

The Bills next drive resulted in Ferguson's 4th consecutive interception, this one thrown to Jerry Holmes, but the Jets were forced to punt, and Lou Piccone returned Chuck Ramsey's 29-yard punt 5 yards to the New York 45-yard line. Then with just over 10 minutes left in the game, Cribbs ran for a 45-yard touchdown, increasing the Bills lead to 31–13. Todd then led the Jets 80 yards in eight plays and completed a 30-yard touchdown pass to Bobby Jones. Then after forcing a punt that Harper returned 6 yards to his own 42, New York drove for another score, aided by a pass interference call against Bills defensive back Mario Clark that nullified an interception. Kevin Long finished the 58-yard drive with a 1-yard touchdown run to cut the score to 31–27. The Jets got the ball back with 2:36 remaining and then drove 69 yards to the Buffalo 11-yard line, aided by a holding penalty that wiped out an interception by Steve Freeman. Todd also made several key completions, including a 29-yarder to Shuler and a 26-yard pass to Derrick Gaffney on third and 20. However, Simpson's interception at the 1-yard line halted New York's comeback with two seconds left.

Simpson recorded two interceptions, while Lewis caught seven passes for a franchise postseason record 158 yards and two touchdowns. Shuler caught six passes for 116 yards and a touchdown. Todd threw for 377 yards, while Ferguson threw for 268. Both quarterbacks threw two touchdowns and were intercepted four times. Simpson and Buttle each had two interceptions. Cribbs rushed for 83 yards and a touchdown, while also catching 4 passes for 64 yards.

This was the first postseason meeting between the Bills and Jets and the first NFL playoff matchup between two New York-based teams.

==== NFC: New York Giants 27, Philadelphia Eagles 21 ====
New York Giants vs. Philadelphia Eagles – Game summary

Quarter	1	2	3	4	Total
Giants	20	7	0	0	27
Eagles	0	7	7	7	21

at Veterans Stadium, Philadelphia, Pennsylvania

- Game time: 3:30 p.m. EST
- Game weather: 40 °F (4 °C), drizzle
- Game attendance: 71,611
- Referee: Bob Frederic
- TV announcers (CBS): Pat Summerall (play-by-play) and John Madden (color commentator)

Game information

First quarter

- NYG – Leon Bright 9-yard pass from Scott Brunner (kick failed). Giants 6–0.
- NYG – John Mistler 4-yard pass from Scott Brunner (Joe Danelo kick). Giants 13–0.
- NYG – Mark Haynes recovered fumble in end zone (Joe Danelo kick). Giants 20–0.

Second quarter

- PHI – Harold Carmichael 15-yard pass from Ron Jaworski (Tony Franklin kick). Giants 20–7.
- NYG – Tom Mullady 22-yard pass from Scott Brunner (Joe Danelo kick). Giants 27–7.

Third quarter

- PHI – Wilbert Montgomery 1-yard run (Tony Franklin kick). Giants 27–14.

Fourth quarter

- PHI – Wilbert Montgomery 2-yard run (Tony Franklin kick). Giants 27–21.

Top passers

- NYG – Scott Brunner – 9/14, 96 yards, 3 TD, INT
- PHI – Ron Jaworski – 13/24, 154 yards, TD

Top rushers

- NYG – Rob Carpenter – 33 rushes, 161 yards
- PHI – Wilbert Montgomery – 18 rushes, 65 yards, 2 TD

Top receivers

- NYG – Rob Carpenter – 4 receptions, 32 yards
- PHI – Harold Carmichael – 2 receptions, 43 yards, TD

Despite playing without starting quarterback Phil Simms and linebacker Brad Van Pelt, the Giants jumped to a 20–0 lead in the first quarter and withstood an Eagles comeback at the end to hold on to a 27–21 win.

In the first quarter, Eagles kick/punt returner Wally Henry fumbled a punt due to a hit from Lawrence Taylor and Beasley Reece recovered the ball for the Giants at the Philadelphia 26-yard line. A few plays later, quarterback Scott Brunner then threw a 9-yard touchdown to running back Leon Bright (the extra point attempt failed). Then after forcing a punt, the Giants drove 74 yards, including an 11-yard scramble by Brunner on 3rd and 11, to score on his 10-yard touchdown pass to wide receiver John Mistler. Henry muffed the ensuing kickoff, and as he tried to pick it up, he lost the ball while being hit by Mike Dennis. Mark Haynes recovered the ball in the end zone to give New York a 20–0 lead. After the ensuing kickoff, the first quarter ended with Giants having a 104 to 1 advantage over Philadelphia in total yards gained.

In the second quarter, New York had a chance to increase its lead with a drive into Eagles territory, but Philadelphia's defense dug in and stuffed Brunner for no gain on a 4th and 1 conversion attempt on the 35. Later on, Herman Edwards' interception of a Brunner pass gave the Eagles a first down on the New York 26-yard line, which they converted to a 20–7 score with quarterback Ron Jaworski's 15-yard touchdown pass to wide receiver Harold Carmichael. However, Reece returned the ensuing kickoff 27 yards to the 38-yard line, where the Giants proceeded to drive 62 yards in 5 plays to score on Brunner's 22-yard touchdown pass to Tom Mullady, giving them a 27–7 halftime lead. The key play of the drive was a 21-yard run by Rob Carpenter on 2nd and 8 from the 40 with 2:04 left on the clock.

New York was shut out in the second half, while the Eagles opened the third quarter by marching 82 yards in 15 plays on a drive that consumed 7:58 and ended on running back Wilbert Montgomery's 6-yard rushing touchdown. Late in the fourth quarter, New York drove inside the Eagles 20 and had a chance to put the game away, only to have Joe Danelo miss a 32-yard field goal attempt. Philadelphia then drove 80 yards, 44 of them coming from 3 Giants penalties, in 9 plays to score on Montgomery's 1-yard touchdown run, cutting its deficit to 27–21 with 2:51 left in the game. But the Giants were able to run out the rest of the clock, picking up gains of six, three, and five yards on runs by Carpenter for a key first down. It marked the Giants' first postseason victory since the 1958 playoffs and their first road postseason win.

Brunner completed only nine of 14 passes for 96 yards, but threw three touchdowns and only one interception. Most of the Giants offense came from Carpenter, who had 33 carries for 161 yards and four receptions for 32. This game marked a disappointing end to a promising season for the Eagles, who had started out 9–2, but then lost all but one of their remaining games.

This was the first postseason meeting between the Giants and Eagles.

== Divisional round ==
=== Saturday, January 2, 1982 ===
==== NFC: Dallas Cowboys 38, Tampa Bay Buccaneers 0 ====
Tampa Bay Buccaneers vs. Dallas Cowboys – Game summary

Quarter	1	2	3	4	Total
Buccaneers	0	0	0	0	0
Cowboys	0	10	21	7	38

at Texas Stadium, Irving, Texas

- Game time: 12:00 p.m. CST
- Game weather: 70 °F (21 °C), partly cloudy
- Game attendance: 64,848
- Referee: Jerry Markbreit
- TV announcers (CBS): Vin Scully (play-by-play) and Hank Stram (color commentator)

Game information

First quarter

- None

Second quarter

- DAL – Tony Hill 9-yard pass from Danny White (Rafael Septién kick). Cowboys 7–0.
- DAL – Rafael Septién 32-yard field goal. Cowboys 10–0.

Third quarter

- DAL – Ron Springs 1-yard run (Rafael Septién kick). Cowboys 17–0.
- DAL – Tony Dorsett 5-yard run (Rafael Septién kick). Cowboys 24–0.
- DAL – James Jones 5-yard run (Rafael Septién kick). Cowboys 31–0.

Fourth quarter

- DAL – Timmy Newsome 1-yard run (Rafael Septién kick). Cowboys 38–0.

Top passers

- TB – Doug Williams – 10/29, 187 yards, 4 INT
- DAL – Danny White – 15/26, 143 yards, TD

Top rushers

- TB – James Owens – 12 rushes, 40 yards
- DAL – Tony Dorsett – 16 rushes, 86 yards, TD

Top receivers

- TB – Jimmie Giles – 2 receptions, 98 yards
- DAL – Tony Dorsett – 4 receptions, 48 yards

The Cowboys crushed the Buccaneers, limiting them to 24 rushing yards and 222 total yards. Bucs quarterback Doug Williams threw four interceptions (three of which resulted in touchdowns), committed two intentional grounding penalties, and was sacked four times.

After the first quarter was scoreless, Dennis Thurman's 19-yard interception return to the Bucs 47-yard line set up Danny White's 9-yard touchdown pass to receiver Tony Hill. Tampa Bay responded with a 59-yard drive to the Cowboys 21-yard line. But on second down and 6, Dallas lineman Ed "Too Tall" Jones plowed through a block attempt by Charley Hannah and chased Williams all the way back to the 49-yard line before he grounded the ball with a desperate throw. The lost yardage on the grounding penalty pushed the Buccaneers out of field goal range and they ended up punting. Cowboys kicker Rafael Septién later added a 32-yard field goal to give the Cowboys a 10–0 halftime lead. A key aspect that had worked against Tampa Bay in the first half was starting field position. Their first half drives started from the 21, 20, 8, 20, 8 and 19-yard lines. Cowboys coach Tom Landry twice rejected long field-goal attempts from the 34 and 37, and each time White (who also played punter) punted the ball out of bounds at the 8.

Dallas took the opening kickoff of the second half and marched 80-yards, including a 25-yard gain on a screen pass reception by Tony Dorsett, to score on running back Ron Springs' 1-yard rushing touchdown. Then rookie free safety Michael Downs picked off a pass from Williams and returned it 21 yards to the Tampa Bay 33, leading to Dorsett's 5-yard score that put the team up 24–0. On the next drive, defensive tackle John Dutton deflected Williams' pass into the arms of Ed "Too Tall" Jones for an interception on the Bucs 25-yard line, and the Cowboys scored another touchdown with a 5-yard run by James Jones. In the fourth quarter, Williams completed a 75-yard pass to Jimmie Giles on the Cowboys 5-yard line, but the Buccaneers were still unable to get any points on the drive. On second and 8, Williams was sacked by Harvey Martin for a 9-yard loss, and then turned the ball over with consecutive incompletions. Later on, a pass interference penalty in the end zone against Tampa Bay defensive back Cedric Brown set up the final score of the game on Timmy Newsome's 1-yard run.

White completed 15 of 26 passes for 146 yards and a touchdown. Dorsett was the top rusher of the game with 85 yards and a touchdown, while also catching four passes for 48 yards. Thurman had two interceptions and 50 return yards.

This was the first postseason meeting between the Buccaneers and Cowboys.

==== AFC: San Diego Chargers 41, Miami Dolphins 38 (OT) ====
San Diego Chargers vs. Miami Dolphins – Game summary

Quarter	1	2	3	4	OT	Total
Chargers	24	0	7	7	3	41
Dolphins	0	17	14	7	0	38

at Miami Orange Bowl, Miami, Florida

- Game time: 5:00 p.m. EST
- Game weather: 79 °F (26 °C), scattered clouds, humid
- Game attendance: 73,735
- Referee: Fred Wyant
- TV announcers (NBC): Don Criqui (play-by-play) and John Brodie (color commentator)

Game information

First quarter

- SD – Rolf Benirschke 32-yard field goal. Chargers 3–0.
- SD – Wes Chandler 56-yard punt return (Rolf Benirschke kick). Chargers 10–0.
- SD – Chuck Muncie 1-yard run (Rolf Benirschke kick). Chargers 17–0.
- SD – James Brooks 8-yard pass from Dan Fouts (Rolf Benirschke kick). Chargers 24–0.

Second quarter

- MIA – Uwe von Schamann 34-yard field goal. Chargers 24–3.
- MIA – Joe Rose 1-yard pass from Don Strock (Uwe von Schamann kick). Chargers 24–10.
- MIA – Tony Nathan 25-yard lateral pass from Duriel Harris (Uwe von Schamann kick). Chargers 24–17.

Third quarter

- MIA – Joe Rose 15-yard pass from Don Strock (Uwe von Schamann kick). Tied 24–24.
- SD – Kellen Winslow 25-yard pass from Dan Fouts (Rolf Benirschke kick). Chargers 31–24.
- MIA – Bruce Hardy 50-yard pass from Don Strock (Uwe von Schamann kick). Tied 31–31.

Fourth quarter

- MIA – Tony Nathan 12-yard run (Uwe von Schamann kick). Dolphins 38–31.
- SD – James Brooks 9-yard pass from Dan Fouts (Rolf Benirschke kick). Tied 38–38.

Overtime

- SD – Rolf Benirschke 29-yard field goal. Chargers 41–38.

Top passers

- SD – Dan Fouts – 33/53, 433 yards, 3 TD, INT
- MIA – Don Strock – 29/43, 403 yards, 4 TD, INT

Top rushers

- SD – Chuck Muncie – 24 rushes, 120 yards, TD
- MIA – Tony Nathan – 14 rushes, 48 yards, TD

Top receivers

- SD – Kellen Winslow – 13 receptions, 166 yards, TD
- MIA – Tony Nathan – 9 receptions, 114 yards, TD

Chargers placekicker Rolf Benirschke kicked the winning 29-yard field goal after 13:52 of overtime, ending a game that became known in National Football League lore as the Epic in Miami. This game set playoff records for the most points scored in a playoff game (79), most total yards by both teams (1,036), and most passing yards by both teams (809).

On San Diego's opening drive, Dan Fouts' 47-yard completion to Wes Chandler set up Benirschke's 32-yard field goal. Then Miami was forced to punt and Chandler returned the ball 56 yards for a touchdown. On the ensuing kickoff, the ball hit the ground and bounced back in the Chargers direction, enabling them to recover it and eventually score on running back Chuck Muncie's 1-yard rushing touchdown. On the Dolphins next possession, Chargers safety Glen Edwards intercepted a pass from David Woodley and returned it 35 yards to set up Fouts' 8-yard touchdown pass to rookie running back James Brooks, which increased the score to 24–0.

Early in the second quarter, Woodley was replaced by Don Strock who started off his first play with a 17-yard completion to Duriel Harris on a drive that Uwe von Schamann finished with a 34-yard field goal. Miami's defense subsequently recovered a fumble from Fouts, giving its offense the ball on the Chargers 39-yard line, and Strock took advantage, leading them to score on his 1-yard touchdown pass to tight end Joe Rose. Later on, Benirschke missed a 55-yard field goal attempt, giving Miami the ball with good field position. Three plays later from the 40-yard line, Strock took the snap and threw a pass intended for Harris at the 20-yard line. Harris caught the ball and immediately lateraled it to Tony Nathan, who then took it 25 yards to the end zone as time expired in the half, cutting the deficit to 24–17.

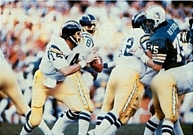
Chargers' quarterback back Dan Fouts (middle) runs a play against the Dolphins in the AFC Divisional Playoff game.

In the third quarter, Miami drove 74 yards and tied it at 24, with Strock's 15-yard touchdown completion to Rose. San Diego countered with a 6-play, 60-yard drive to score on Fouts' 25-yard touchdown completion to tight end Kellen Winslow. But Miami re-tied the game with Strock completing six consecutive passes, the last a 50-yard score to Bruce Hardy. Then Miami defensive back Lyle Blackwood's interception set up a 12-yard touchdown run by Nathan, giving Miami its first lead of the game, 38–31, on the first play of the fourth quarter. Later on, with Miami just trying to maintain its lead and run out the clock, Chargers safety Pete Shaw recovered a fumble from Andra Franklin on San Diego's 18-yard line with 4:39 left in regulation. Fouts then led his team down to Miami's nine-yard line. With only 58 seconds left in the game, a heavy Dolphins pass rush forced Fouts to throw a blind pass intended for Winslow in the end zone. The pass sailed over Winslow's head, but went right into the arms of Brooks for a touchdown to tie the game.

Miami took over on its own 40-yard line following Benirschke's squib kick, needing only a field goal to win. Following an incomplete pass, Strock's next throw was intercepted by Willie Buchanon, but as he made the diving catch, he fumbled the ball back to Miami when he hit the ground. After that, Nathan's 17-yard reception and Tommy Vigorito's 6-yard run moved the Dolphins to the Chargers 26-yard line where von Schamann attempted a 43-yard field goal, but at the last second, Winslow extended his 6'5" frame at the line just enough to deflect the kick with his fingers, causing it to fall short of the goal posts and sending the game into overtime.

In overtime, the Chargers took the opening kickoff and advanced to the Miami 8-yard line, but Benirschke missed a 27-yard field goal attempt. Then after both teams exchanged punts twice, the Dolphins reached the San Diego 17-yard line, only to see von Schamann's 34-yard attempt get blocked by Leroy Jones. Aided by two receptions from Charlie Joiner for 49 yards, the Chargers then drove 74 yards to the Miami 10-yard line, where Benirschke eventually kicked the winning field goal.

Strock turned in the best game of his life, completing 29 of 43 passes for 403 yards and four touchdowns, while Fouts put on one of the best performances of his Hall of Fame career, completing 33 of 53 passes for 433 yards and three touchdowns. Harris caught six passes for 106 yards. Nathan rushed for 48 yards, caught nine passes for 114 yards, and scored two touchdowns. Muncie rushed for 124 yards and a touchdown. In addition to his 56-yard punt return touchdown, Chandler caught six passes for 106 yards. Brooks recorded 143 all-purpose yards. The image of an exhausted Winslow, who finished the game with 13 receptions for 166 yards and a touchdown, being helped off the field by two of his Chargers teammates is now an iconic visual of NFL Films.

This was the first postseason meeting between the Chargers and Dolphins.

=== Sunday, January 3, 1982 ===
==== AFC: Cincinnati Bengals 28, Buffalo Bills 21 ====
Buffalo Bills vs. Cincinnati Bengals – Game summary

Quarter	1	2	3	4	Total
Bills	0	7	7	7	21
Bengals	14	0	7	7	28

at Riverfront Stadium, Cincinnati, Ohio

- Game time: 1:00 p.m. EST
- Game weather: 50 °F (10 °C), fog
- Game attendance: 55,420
- Referee: Pat Haggerty
- TV announcers (NBC): Dick Enberg (play-by-play) and Merlin Olsen (color commentator)

Game information

First quarter

- CIN – Charles Alexander 4-yard run (Jim Breech kick). Bengals 7–0.
- CIN – Pete Johnson 1-yard run (Jim Breech kick). Bengals 14–0.

Second quarter

- BUF – Joe Cribbs 1-yard run (Nick Mike-Mayer kick). Bengals 14–7.

Third quarter

- BUF – Joe Cribbs 44-yard run (Nick Mike-Mayer kick). Tied 14–14.
- CIN – Charles Alexander 20-yard run (Jim Breech kick). Bengals 21–14.

Fourth quarter

- BUF – Jerry Butler 21-yard pass from Joe Ferguson (Nick Mike-Mayer kick). Tied 21–21.
- CIN – Cris Collinsworth 16-yard pass from Ken Anderson (Jim Breech kick). Bengals 28–21.

Top passers

- BUF – Joe Ferguson – 15/31, 202 yards, TD, 2 INT
- CIN – Ken Anderson – 14/21, 192 yards, 2 TD

Top rushers

- BUF – Joe Cribbs – 15 rushes, 90 yards, 2 TD
- CIN – Charles Alexander – 13 rushes, 72 yards, 2 TD

Top receivers

- BUF – Jerry Butler – 4 receptions, 98 yards, TD
- CIN – Dan Ross – 6 receptions, 71 yards

The Bengals earned their first playoff win in team history after Bills quarterback Joe Ferguson's fourth-down pass fell incomplete while attempting to drive for the tying touchdown.

Two key plays allowed the Bengals to start their first two drives in Buffalo territory, and they took advantage of their field position with touchdowns on each one. First, defensive back Mike Fuller returned a punt 27 yards to the Bills 42-yard line. Six plays later (one a 14-yard catch by tight end Dan Ross), Charles Alexander scored on a 4-yard touchdown run. On Buffalo's ensuing drive, Ken Riley intercepted a pass from Ferguson on the Bills 48-yard line. Cincinnati then drove 48 yards in eight plays, including Isaac Curtis' 22-yard reception on second and 17, to score with fullback Pete Johnson's 1-yard run, giving them a 14–0 lead before Buffalo had gained a single first down or completed a pass.

After another Buffalo punt, Bengals quarterback Ken Anderson completed an 18-yard pass to Ross to give his team a first down on the Bills 41-yard line. Cincinnati eventually drove inside the 10, but the Bills made a key defensive stand, as defensive end Ken Johnson sacked Anderson at the 15 on third down and then Robb Riddick leaped high in the air to block Jim Breech's 33-yard field goal attempt. This seemed to spark Buffalo's offense, which subsequently picked up three first downs on a drive to the Bengals 30-yard line, but they also came up empty when linebacker Bo Harris intercepted Ferguson's pass and returned it 16 yards to the 24. Following a Bengals punt, Ferguson's 54-yard completion to Jerry Butler set up a 1-yard touchdown run by Joe Cribbs, cutting the score to 14–7 by halftime.

Early in the third quarter, the Bills advanced 69 yards in five plays, starting with Ferguson's 15-yard pass to Frank Lewis and ending with a 44-yard touchdown run by Cribbs to tie the game. Cincinnati's David Verser returned the ensuing kickoff 40 yards to the 35-yard line, and the team responded with a 7-play 65-yard drive, including a 13-yard scramble by Anderson, to retake the lead with a 20-yard touchdown run by Alexander. Buffalo struck right back with a 79-yard scoring drive. Cribbs was injured and knocked out of the game on the first play, but his replacement Roland Hooks rushed five times for 24 yards and caught a pass for 6, while Ferguson finished the drive with a 20-yard touchdown pass to Butler, tying the game back up at 21 on the first play of the fourth quarter.

With 10:39 left in the game, Anderson threw a 16-yard touchdown pass to rookie receiver Cris Collinsworth, giving the Bengals a 28–21 lead at the end of a 9-play, 79-yard drive that saw him burn the Bills with a 42-yard completion on a short pass to Steve Kreider on third and 1 from the Bengals 42-yard line. The Bills drove to the Cincinnati 21-yard line with about three minutes left to play, and it appeared that Ferguson completed a fourth-down pass to Lou Piccone to gain a first down. However, Buffalo was called for a delay of game penalty, and Ferguson's pass attempt on the next snap fell incomplete. The Bills defense managed to force a punt with under a minute left, but Ferguson threw four consecutive incompletions as time expired in the game.

Buffalo's miscue on its final drive was particularly noteworthy in that it came after they had called a timeout, making a subsequent delay of game penalty highly unusual. One cited reason for this was the last second substitution of receivers Piccone and Ron Jessie into the huddle. Bills coach Chuck Knox later explained this was an attempt to prevent the defense from adjusting to new personnel, an attempt that would have paid off if the ball had been snapped on time, as Piccone did make a first down catch on the ensuing play.

Anderson finished the game with 14 of 21 completions for 192 yards and a touchdown. Johnson, the team's leading rusher with 1,077 yards during the season, was held to just 45 yards, but it did not matter as the Bengals still racked up 136 yards on the ground, 72 of them and two touchdowns from Alexander. Ferguson threw for 202 yards and a touchdown, but completed only 15 of 31 passes and was intercepted twice. Cribbs finished with a career postseason high 90 rushing yards and two touchdowns. Butler caught four passes for 98 yards and a score.

This was the first postseason meeting between the Bills and Bengals.

==== NFC: San Francisco 49ers 38, New York Giants 24 ====
New York Giants vs. San Francisco 49ers – Game summary

Quarter	1	2	3	4	Total
Giants	7	3	7	7	24
49ers	7	17	0	14	38

at Candlestick Park, San Francisco, California

- Game time: 2:00 p.m. PST
- Game weather: 47 °F (8 °C), cloudy
- Game attendance: 58,360
- Referee: Ben Dreith
- TV announcers (CBS): Pat Summerall (play-by-play) and John Madden (color commentator)

Game information

First quarter

- SF – Charle Young 8-yard pass from Joe Montana (Ray Wersching kick). 49ers 7–0.
- NYG – Earnest Gray 72-yard pass from Scott Brunner (Joe Danelo kick). Tied 7–7.

Second quarter

- SF – Ray Wersching 22-yard field goal. 49ers 10–7.
- SF – Freddie Solomon 58-yard pass from Joe Montana (Ray Wersching kick). 49ers 17–7.
- SF – Ricky Patton 25-yard run (Ray Wersching kick). 49ers 24–7.
- NYG – Joe Danelo 48-yard field goal. 49ers 24–10.

Third quarter

- NYG – Johnny Perkins 59-yard pass from Scott Brunner (Joe Danelo kick). 49ers 24–17.

Fourth quarter

- SF – Bill Ring 3-yard run (Ray Wersching kick). 49ers 31–17.
- SF – Ronnie Lott 20-yard interception return (Ray Wersching kick). 49ers 38–17.
- NYG – Johnny Perkins 17-yard pass from Scott Brunner (Joe Danelo kick). 49ers 38–24.

Top passers

- NYG – Scott Brunner – 16/37, 290 yards, 3 TD, 2 INT
- SF – Joe Montana – 20/31, 304 yards, 2 TD, INT

Top rushers

- NYG – Rob Carpenter – 17 rushes, 61 yards
- SF – Earl Cooper – 7 rushes, 52 yards

Top receivers

- NYG – Johnny Perkins – 7 receptions, 121 yards, 2 TD
- SF – Freddie Solomon – 6 receptions, 107 yards, TD

25-year-old San Francisco quarterback Joe Montana led the 49ers to victory in his first playoff game, completing 20 of 31 passes for a career-high 304 yards and two touchdowns and an interception.

The 49ers jumped to a 24–7 lead in the second quarter, and scored two touchdowns in the final quarter to secure the victory. San Francisco took the opening kickoff and advanced 85 yards in 13 plays, assisted by a defensive holding penalty on a punt that allowed them to keep the drive going. Montana finished the drive with an 8-yard touchdown to tight end Charle Young. Two drives later, the Giants countered when quarterback Scott Brunner threw a pass to wide receiver Earnest Gray, who caught it at his own 40, evaded three 49ers defensive backs, and raced to the end zone for a 72-yard touchdown reception. 49ers running back Amos Lawrence returned the following kickoff 47 yards to the Giants 48-yard line. The 49ers soon faced 3rd and 17 from the 44, but Montana was able to convert with a 39-yard completion to Dwight Clark, which led to a 22-yard field goal by Ray Wersching that gave them a 10–7 lead on the first play of the second quarter.

On the Giants next possession, Ronnie Lott's interception gave the 49ers a first down on the own 31-yard line, where they drove to a 17–7 lead on Freddie Solomon's 58-yard touchdown reception. Linebacker Keena Turner recovered a fumble from Leon Bright on the first play after the ensuing kickoff, and Ricky Patton scored on a 25-yard touchdown run a few plays later to give the 49ers a 24–7 lead. New York then drove 52 yards in 13 plays to score on 48-yard field goal by Joe Danelo, making it 24–10. The 49ers had a chance to increase their lead before halftime, but Wersching missed a 50-yard field goal attempt with less than a minute left.

On the opening drive of the third quarter, Montana threw an interception to Bill Currier on the Giants 41-yard line. Brunner completed a 59-yard touchdown pass to wide receiver Johnny Perkins on the next play to make it 24–17. The next time they had the ball, New York drove 85 yards to the 49ers 4-yard line, but it ended there and Danelo hit the uprights on a 21-yard field goal attempt. In the fourth quarter, Solomon returned a Giants punt 22 yards to the New York 36-yard line, and the 49ers went on to score on Bill Ring's 3-yard rushing touchdown. Later on, Lott returned his second interception of the game 20 yards to the end zone to give San Francisco a 38–17 lead and clinch the game. Brunner then made a 17-yard touchdown to Perkins to close out the scoring.

Solomon was the 49ers top receiver with 6 catches for 107 yards and a touchdown, while also rushing for 12 yards and returning a punt for 22. Clark added 5 receptions for 104 yards. Perkins finished the day with 7 receptions for 121 yards, while Gray had 3 for 117.

CBS's broadcast of the Giants-49ers NFC Divisional Playoff game also featured the introduction of the telestrator to a national audience.

This was the first postseason meeting between the Giants and 49ers.

== Conference championships ==
=== Sunday, January 10, 1982 ===
==== AFC: Cincinnati Bengals 27, San Diego Chargers 7 ====
San Diego Chargers vs. Cincinnati Bengals – Game summary

Quarter	1	2	3	4	Total
Chargers	0	7	0	0	7
Bengals	10	7	3	7	27

at Riverfront Stadium, Cincinnati, Ohio

- Game time: 1:00 p.m. EST
- Game weather: −9 °F (−23 °C), sunny, windy
- Game attendance: 46,302
- Referee: Fred Silva
- TV announcers (NBC): Dick Enberg (play-by-play) and Merlin Olsen (color commentator)

Game information

First quarter

- CIN – Jim Breech 31-yard field goal. Bengals 3–0.
- CIN – M. L. Harris 8-yard pass from Ken Anderson (Jim Breech kick). Bengals 10–0.

Second quarter

- SD – Kellen Winslow 33-yard pass from Dan Fouts (Rolf Benirschke kick). Bengals 10–7.
- CIN – Pete Johnson 1-yard run (Jim Breech kick). Bengals 17–7.

Third quarter

- CIN – Jim Breech 38-yard field goal. Bengals 20–7.

Fourth quarter

- CIN – Don Bass 3-yard pass from Ken Anderson (Jim Breech kick). Bengals 27–7.

Top passers

- SD – Dan Fouts – 15/28, 185 yards, TD, 2 INT
- CIN – Ken Anderson – 14/22, 161 yards, 2 TD

Top rushers

- SD – Chuck Muncie – 23 rushes, 94 yards
- CIN – Pete Johnson – 21 rushes, 80 yards, TD

Top receivers

- SD – Wes Chandler – 6 receptions, 79 yards
- CIN – Dan Ross – 5 receptions, 69 yards

In a game subsequently known as the Freezer Bowl, the Bengals defeated the Chargers 27–7. Despite a game-time temperature of −9 °F (−23 °C) and a 35-mile-per-hour wind that sent wind chills as low as −59 °F (−51 °C), Bengals' quarterback Ken Anderson threw for 161 yards and two touchdowns, with no interceptions, and rushed for 39 yards to lead his team to a victory. Cincinnati's defense intercepted San Diego quarterback Dan Fouts twice and recovered two fumbles, while the offense did not commit a single turnover until late in the third quarter when they already had a solid lead.

Aided by an 18-yard completion from Anderson to tight end Dan Ross, Cincinnati scored first with a 31-yard field goal from kicker Jim Breech. Then linebacker Rick Razzano forced a fumble from Chargers' rookie kick returner James Brooks, and Don Bass recovered for the Bengals on the San Diego 12-yard line. Following a 4-yard run by Charles Alexander, the Bengals scored a touchdown on an 8-yard pass from Anderson to tight end M. L. Harris, increasing their lead to 10–0. Brooks returned the ensuing kickoff 35 yards to the 43-yard line. Then on third down and 9, Fouts' 21-yard completion to Wes Chandler moved the ball to the Bengals 33. But Cincinnati's defense halted the drive at the 18-yard line and it ended with no points when Rolf Benirschke missed a 37-yard field goal attempt.

After a Bengals punt, Chandler gave the Chargers good field position with a 7-yard return to the 45-yard line. San Diego then drove 55 yards and cut its deficit to 10–7 when Fouts, desperately trying to avoid a hit from Eddie Edwards, managed to fire a pass to Kellen Winslow at the line of scrimmage, who subsequently raced 33 yards down the right sideline for a score. But the Bengals stormed right back on a drive set up by David Verser's 40-yard kickoff to the 46-yard line. Faced with third down and 7 inside the red zone later in the drive, Anderson kept the drive going with a 16-yard completion to Isaac Curtis on the Chargers 1-yard line, and fullback Pete Johnson scored a touchdown run on the next play, giving them a 17–7 lead.

The Bengals completely took over the game from that point on. The Chargers would move the ball inside the Bengals 40-yard line five times during the rest of the game, but failed to score on each possession. San Diego responded with a drive to the Bengals 33-yard line, but came up empty when defensive back Louis Breeden intercepted a deep pass intended for Charlie Joiner at the 5-yard line. The Chargers defense quickly gave the offense another scoring opportunity, forcing a punt from Pat McInally that went just 32 yards to the Bengals 45. But once again this amounted to nothing as Fouts was intercepted in the end zone by rookie safety Bobby Kemp.

On the opening drive of the second half, San Diego drove to the Bengals 38-yard line, only to lose its fourth turnover of the day when Reggie Williams stripped the ball from Chuck Muncie and Cincinnati's Ross Browner recovered it. Then Anderson went to work, rushing three times for 31 yards and completing a 19-yard pass to Ross on a drive that moved the ball inside the San Diego 10-yard line. Following three incompletions and a touchdown called back by a holding penalty, Breech's 38-yard field goal made the score 20–7. On the Bengals next drive, Anderson's five completions moved the ball deep into Chargers territory, but Willie Buchanon put an end to it when he recovered a fumble from Ross that had been forced by Woodrow Lowe. The Chargers then drove to the Bengals 20-yard line, but on third down, Fouts tripped over the foot of guard Doug Wilkerson and was downed for an 11-yard loss. Then Benirschke missed a 50-yard field goal try on the next play.

Taking the ball back after the missed field goal, Cincinnati put the game away with a 14-play touchdown drive. Anderson was injured early in the drive and replaced for two plays by Jack Thompson. But Johnson kept the Bengals moving on those plays, first rushing for eight yards and then gaining 14 yards on a screen pass on third down and 8. Later on the drive, Johnson converted a fourth and inches situation with a 7-yard run, and Anderson eventually finished it off with a 3-yard touchdown pass to Bass, making the final score 27–7. San Diego responded with a drive to the Bengals 5-yard line, but turned the ball over on downs with less than three minutes left.

This was the first postseason meeting between the Chargers and Bengals.

==== NFC: San Francisco 49ers 28, Dallas Cowboys 27 ====
Dallas Cowboys vs. San Francisco 49ers – Game summary

Quarter	1	2	3	4	Total
Cowboys	10	7	0	10	27
49ers	7	7	7	7	28

at Candlestick Park, San Francisco, California

- Game time: 2:00 p.m. PST
- Game weather: 52 °F (11 °C), sunny
- Game attendance: 60,525
- Referee: Jim Tunney
- TV announcers (CBS): Vin Scully (play-by-play) and Hank Stram (color commentator)

Game information

First quarter

- SF – Freddie Solomon 8-yard pass from Joe Montana (Ray Wersching kick). 49ers 7–0.
- DAL – Rafael Septién 44-yard field goal. 49ers 7–3.
- DAL – Tony Hill 26-yard pass from Danny White (Rafael Septién kick). Cowboys 10–7.

Second quarter

- SF – Dwight Clark 20-yard pass from Joe Montana (Ray Wersching kick). 49ers 14–10.
- DAL – Tony Dorsett 5-yard run (Rafael Septién kick). Cowboys 17–14.

Third quarter

- SF – Johnny Davis 2-yard run (Ray Wersching kick). 49ers 21–17.

Fourth quarter

- DAL – Rafael Septién 22-yard field goal. 49ers 21–20.
- DAL – Doug Cosbie 21-yard pass from Danny White (Rafael Septién kick). Cowboys 27–21.
- SF – Dwight Clark 6-yard pass from Joe Montana (Ray Wersching kick). 49ers 28–27.

Top passers

- DAL – Danny White – 16/24, 173 yards, 2 TD, INT
- SF – Joe Montana – 22/35, 286 yards, 3 TD, 3 INT

Top rushers

- DAL – Tony Dorsett – 22 rushes, 91 yards, TD
- SF – Lenvil Elliott – 10 rushes, 48 yards

Top receivers

- DAL – Tony Hill – 2 receptions, 43 yards, TD
- SF – Dwight Clark – 8 receptions, 120 yards, 2 TD

In a play that would become known as The Catch, 49ers wide receiver Dwight Clark made a leaping grab at the back of the end zone to score the winning touchdown with 51 seconds left in the game. The win sent the 49ers to their first Super Bowl and snapped their three-game playoff losing streak to the Cowboys.

After forcing Dallas to punt on the opening drive, San Francisco quarterback Joe Montana completed a 17-yard pass to Charle Young and a 24-yarder to Lenvil Elliott before throwing an 8-yard touchdown pass to wide receiver Freddie Solomon. Dallas responded with Danny White's 20-yard pass to Butch Johnson setting up a 44-yard field goal by Rafael Septién. Then 49ers running back Bill Ring lost a fumble on his own 29, leading to White's 26-yard touchdown pass to Tony Hill that put the Cowboys up 10–7.

In the second quarter, San Francisco reached the Cowboys 27-yard line, only to lose the ball when Everson Walls intercepted a pass from Montana in the end zone. But after forcing a Dallas punt, Montana threw a 20-yard touchdown to Clark to retake the lead, 14–10. Dallas responded with an 80-yard drive, including a controversial pass interference penalty on 49ers defensive back Ronnie Lott which nullified his interception and gave the Cowboys a 35-yard gain at the San Francisco 12-yard line. Three plays later, running back Tony Dorsett scored on a 5-yard rushing touchdown to give Dallas a 17–14 lead. The 49ers got another chance to score before halftime when they recovered a fumbled punt on the Dallas 42. But after a 15-yard illegal block penalty on Clark, Montana lost a fumble while being sacked by Harvey Martin. The Cowboys fared no better as White was sacked twice on their next drive, once by Jim Stuckey and once by Lawrence Pillers, and the half ended soon after.

In the third quarter, San Francisco got another scoring opportunity when Dwight Hicks returned a punt 12 yards to midfield. The 49ers then drove to the Dallas 16-yard line, but once again they failed to score when Montana threw a pass that bounced out of Elliott's hands and was intercepted by Randy White. However, the Cowboys soon returned the favor with Danny White's interception to linebacker Bobby Leopold, and this time the 49ers converted, regaining the lead at 21–17 with a 2-yard touchdown run by running back Johnny Davis.

One minute into the fourth quarter, Septién kicked a 22-yard field goal that cut the deficit to 21–20. Then Walls recovered a fumble from running back Walt Easley at midfield to set up White's 21-yard touchdown pass to tight end Doug Cosbie, giving Dallas a 27–21 advantage. Things got even better for Dallas when Walls recorded his second interception from Montana on the next drive at the Cowboys 27. Dallas managed to pick up a few first downs, but was forced to punt, and White's kick gave San Francisco the ball at its own 11 with 4:54 left in the game.

Montana subsequently led the 49ers 83 yards to the Dallas 6-yard line. Elliott rushed four times for 30 yards on the drive, while Solomon also made a big impact, catching two passes for 18 yards and rushing for 15 on a wide receiver reverse. Facing third down and 3 on the Cowboys 6 with 58 seconds left, Montana threw a high pass that Clark just managed to break ahead of Walls and reach in the air for the game-winning touchdown reception. Other contributors on the final 89-yard drive that led to the play now referred to as “The Catch” included Freddie Solomon (WR), Lenvil Elliott (RB), Earl Cooper (FB), Mike Wilson, Charle Young (TE), Dan Audick (LT), John Ayers (LG), Fred Quillan (C), Randy Cross (RG), and Keith Fahnhorst (RT).

However, the Cowboys needed only a field goal to win, and still had enough time left in the game for one last drive. White threw a completion to Drew Pearson that almost went for a touchdown, but 49ers corner Eric Wright made a key tackle by getting one hand inside Pearson's jersey and dragging him down. One play later, Pillers sacked White, forcing a fumble that was recovered by Stuckey, and the 49ers had their victory. Clark finished the game with eight receptions for 120 yards and two touchdowns. Dallas defensive back Everson Walls intercepted two passes and recovered a fumble, though he had the misfortune of being assigned to cover Clark on "the catch" play. San Francisco won despite losing six turnovers.

This was the fourth postseason meeting between the Cowboys and 49ers. Dallas won all three previous meetings.

Previous playoff games
Dallas leads 3–0 in all-time playoff games

1970

Dallas Cowboys 17 @ San Francisco 49ers 10

1970 NFC Championship Game

1971

San Francisco 49ers 3 @ Dallas Cowboys 14

1971 NFC Championship Game

1972

Dallas Cowboys 30 @ San Francisco 49ers 28

1972 NFC Divisional playoffs

== Super Bowl XVI: San Francisco 49ers 26, Cincinnati Bengals 21 ==
Super Bowl XVI – San Francisco 49ers vs. Cincinnati Bengals – Game summary

Quarter	1	2	3	4	Total
49ers (NFC)	7	13	0	6	26
Bengals (AFC)	0	0	7	14	21

at Pontiac Silverdome, Pontiac, Michigan

- Date: January 24, 1982
- Game attendance: 81,270
- Referee: Pat Haggerty
- TV announcers (CBS): Pat Summerall (play-by-play) and John Madden (color commentator)

This was the first Super Bowl meeting between the 49ers and Bengals.
