= 1981 Philadelphia Eagles season =

NFL team season

- Owner: Leonard Tose
- General manager: Jim Murray
- Head coach: Dick Vermeil
- Defensive coordinator: Marion Campbell
- Home stadium: Veterans Stadium

Results
- Record: 10–6
- Division place: 2nd NFC East
- Playoffs: Lost Wild Card Playoffs (vs. Giants) 21–27

The 1981 season was the Philadelphia Eagles' 49th in the National Football League (NFL). They made the postseason for the fourth straight season (the first time in franchise history the Eagles made the postseason four straight times). The team was coming off a loss to the Oakland Raiders in Super Bowl XV the previous season. Because they made the Super Bowl in 1980, the Eagles were picked by many not only to reach the Super Bowl, but to win it as well. The Eagles began the 1981 season with 6 straight wins, their best ever start to a season at the time. They won 3 of their next 5 games for a record of 9–2. Then they lost their next 4 games in a row to slip to 9–6 but clinched a playoff spot for the fourth straight season prior to the final week of the regular season due to owning a tiebreaker with the Packers and not finishing last had the Eagles, Giants, and Packers finished 9–7.

The next week, they hammered the St. Louis Cardinals 38–0 to clinch the Wild Card Game would be held in Philadelphia. In the playoffs, they met their arch rivals the New York Giants. It was New York's first playoff appearance in 18 years. The Giants stunned the Eagles 27–21, ending the Eagles' season as well as hopes for a second straight Super Bowl appearance. The Eagles would not make the playoffs again until 1988. They wouldn't reach the Super Bowl again until 2004.

== Offseason ==
=== NFL draft ===
After going 12–4, winning the NFC title and losing in Super Bowl XV to the Oakland Raiders in the 1980 season, the Eagles were slotted to pick next to last in the 12 rounds of the 1981 NFL draft.

The NFL draft was the procedure by which National Football League teams selected amateur college football players. It is officially known as the NFL Annual Player Selection Meeting. The draft was held April 28–29, 1981. ESPN covered all 12 rounds live for the first time. ESPN then showed a replay later that night. This was over a period of two days.

The Eagles had the 27th pick in each of the 12 rounds of the draft except for the 5th, 6th, and 8th rounds; they had no picks for these rounds because of draft-day trades. Instead, they had two picks in the 7th round: the 8th and 27th picks. The Eagles drafted a total of 10 players.

1981 Philadelphia Eagles Draft
Round	Selection	Player	Position	College
1	27	Leonard Mitchell	DE	Houston
2	55	Dean Miraldi	G	Utah
3	83	Greg LaFleur	TE	LSU
4	110	Calvin Murray	RB	Ohio State
6	165	Traded to NY Giants		
7	174	Alan Duncan	K	Tennessee
7	192	Doak Field	LB	Baylor
8	220	Traded to Baltimore		
9	247	Chuck Commiskey	OL	Ole Miss
10	275	Hubie Oliver	RB	Arizona
11	303	Gail Davis	DT	Virginia Union
12	331	Ray Ellis	DB	Ohio State

== Personnel ==
=== Staff ===
1981 Philadelphia Eagles staff
Front office: Owner – Leonard Tose; General manager – Jim Murray; Director of player personnel – Carl Peterson; Head coaches: Head coach – Dick Vermeil; Offensive coaches: Running backs – John Becker; Receivers – Dick Coury; Tight ends – Lynn Stiles; Offensive line – Ken Iman; Offensive line – Jerry Wampfler	Defensive coaches: Defensive coordinator – Marion Campbell; Defensive line – Chuck Clausen; Linebackers – George Hill; Defensive backs – Fred Bruney; Special teams coaches: Special teams – Lynn Stiles

=== Roster ===
1981 Philadelphia Eagles roster
Quarterbacks (QB): 7 Ron Jaworski; 9 Joe Pisarcik; Running backs (RB): 37 Billy Campfield; 31 Wilbert Montgomery; 42 Calvin Murray; 34 Hubie Oliver; 32 Booker Russell; Wide receivers (WR): 17 Harold Carmichael; 89 Wally Henry; 85 Charlie Smith; 81 Ron Smith; Tight ends (TE): 86 Steve Folsom; 84 Keith Krepfle; 88 John Spagnola	Offensive linemen (OL): 63 Ron Baker G; 79 Frank Giddens T; 73 Steve Kenney G; 50 Guy Morriss C; 62 Petey Perot G; 76 Jerry Sisemore T; 61 Mark Slater C; 75 Stan Walters T; Defensive linemen (DL): 98 Greg Brown DE; 71 Ken Clarke NT; 78 Carl Hairston DE; 68 Dennis Harrison DE; 65 Charlie Johnson NT; 99 Leonard Mitchell DE	Linebackers (LB): 95 John Bunting OLB; 59 Al Chesley ILB; 57 Mike Curcio ILB; 55 Frank LeMaster ILB; 52 Ray Phillips OLB; 56 Jerry Robinson OLB; 51 Reggie Wilkes OLB; Defensive backs (DB): 27 Richard Blackmore CB; 46 Herm Edwards CB; 24 Ray Ellis SS; 29 Jo Jo Heath CB; 41 Randy Logan SS; 21 John Sciarra FS; 22 Brenard Wilson FS; 43 Roynell Young CB; Special teams (ST): 1 Tony Franklin K; 4 Max Runager P	Reserve: 38 Steve Atkins RB (IR); 66 Bill Bergey LB (IR); 11 Ken Blair WR (IR); 67 Chuck Commiskey G (IR); 93 Gail Davis DE (IR); 33 Louie Giammona RB (IR); 35 Perry Harrington RB (IR); 20 Leroy Harris RB (IR); 80 Alvin Hooks WR (IR); 87 Claude Humphrey DE (IR); 64 Dean Miraldi G (IR); 91 Buddy Moor DE (IR); 83 Rodney Parker WR (IR); 82 Ray Sydnor TE (IR); 54 Steve Wagner LB (IR); Rookies in italics

== Regular season ==
The 1981 season schedule was set by how the Eagles finished in 1980, 1st in NFC East. The way it was laid out, 4 of the 5 teams in the same 5 team division could end up having 10 to 14 common opponents during the 1981 season. Also, when the last regular season game is over you know who you play the following year.

- A home and away series vs Dallas, New York Giants, St. Louis and Washington = 8 games
- The top four teams in the NFC East play the top four teams in the AFC East from the 1980 season = 4 games
- The 1st and 4th place teams in NFC Central and NFC West in the 1980 season

=== Schedule ===
Week	Date	Opponent	Result	Attendance
1	September 6, 1981	at **New York Giants**	**W** 24–10	72,459
2	September 13, 1981	New England Patriots	**W** 13–3	71,089
3	September 17, 1981	at Buffalo Bills	**W** 20–14	78,331
4	September 27, 1981	**Washington Redskins**	**W** 36–13	70,664
5	October 5, 1981	Atlanta Falcons	**W** 16–13	71,488
6	October 11, 1981	at New Orleans Saints	**W** 31–14	52,728
7	October 18, 1981	at Minnesota Vikings	**L** 35–23	45,459
8	October 25, 1981	Tampa Bay Buccaneers	**W** 20–10	70,714
9	November 1, 1981	**Dallas Cowboys**	**L** 17–14	72,111
10	November 8, 1981	at **St. Louis Cardinals**	**W** 52–10	48,421
11	November 15, 1981	Baltimore Colts	**W** 38–13	68,618
12	November 22, 1981	**New York Giants**	**L** 20–10	66,827
13	November 30, 1981	at Miami Dolphins	**L** 13–10	67,797
14	December 6, 1981	at **Washington Redskins**	**L** 15–13	52,206
15	December 13, 1981	at **Dallas Cowboys**	**L** 21–10	64,955
16	December 20, 1981	**St. Louis Cardinals**	**W** 38–0	56,656

Note: Intra-division opponents are in bold text.

=== Game summaries ===
==== Week 1 ====
Sunday, September 6, 1981 Kickoff 1:00 PM Eastern

Played at The Meadowlands on an AstroTurf playing surface at 70 °F (21 °C) with an 11 mph (18 km/h) wind

	**1**	**2**	**3**	**4**	**Total**
Philadelphia Eagles (1–0)	0	10	7	7	24
New York Giants (0–1)	3	0	0	7	10

		**SCORING PLAYS**	**NYG**	**PHI**	**TIME**
1st	Giants	Joe Danelo 27-yard field goal	0	3	
2nd	Eagles	Perry Harrington 1-yard rush (Tony Franklin kick)	7	3	
	Eagles	Tony Franklin 47-yard field goal	10	3	
3rd	Eagles	Rodney Parker 55-yard pass from Ron Jaworski (Tony Franklin kick)	17	3	
4th	Eagles	Wilbert Montgomery 1-yard rush (Tony Franklin kick)	24	3	
	Giants	Leon Perry 19-yard pass from Phil Simms (Joe Danelo kick)	24	10	

==== Week 2 ====
Sunday, September 13, 1981 Kickoff 4:00 PM Eastern

TV Broadcast: NBC Announcers: Dick Enberg and John Brodie

Played at Veterans Stadium on an AstroTurf playing surface weather= 74 °F (23 °C) (Sunny)

	**1**	**2**	**3**	**4**	**Total**
New England Patriots (2–0)	3	0	0	0	3
Philadelphia Eagles (2–0)	0	3	10	0	13

		**SCORING PLAYS**	**NE**	**PHI**	**TIME**
1st	Patriots	John Smith 22-yard field goal	3	0	
2nd	Eagles	Tony Franklin 46-yard field goal	3	3	
3rd	Eagles	Tony Franklin 22-yard field goal	3	6	
	Eagles	Perry Harrington 6-yard rush (Tony Franklin kick)	3	13	

==== Week 3 ====
Thursday, September 17, 1981 Kickoff 8:30 PM Eastern

Played at Rich Stadium on AstroTurf playing surface at 55 °F (13 °C) with an 8 mph (13 km/h) wind

	**1**	**2**	**3**	**4**	**Total**
Philadelphia Eagles (3–0)	7	3	7	3	20
Buffalo Bills (2–1)	0	14	0	0	14

		**SCORING PLAYS**	**PHI**	**BUF**	**TIME**
1st	Eagles	Keith Krepfle 1-yard pass from Ron Jaworski (Tony Franklin kick)	7	0	
2nd	Bills	Joe Cribbs 4-yard rush (Nick Mike-Mayer kick)	7	7	
	Eagles	Tony Franklin 29-yard field goal	10	7	
	Bills	Frank Lewis 20-yard pass from Joe Ferguson (Nick Mike-Mayer kick)	10	14	
3rd	Eagles	Harold Carmichael 15-yard pass from Ron Jaworski (Tony Franklin kick)	17	14	
4th	Eagles	Tony Franklin 46-yard field goal	20	14	

==== Week 4 ====
Sunday, September 27, 1981 Kickoff 1:00 PM Eastern

Played at Veterans Stadium on an AstroTurf playing surface weather= 68 °F (20 °C) (Sunny)

	**1**	**2**	**3**	**4**	**Total**
Washington Redskins (0–4)	0	6	0	7	13
Philadelphia Eagles (4–0)	0	7	7	22	36

		**SCORING PLAYS**	**WAS**	**PHI**	**TIME**
2nd	Eagles	Louie Giammona 13-yard pass from Ron Jaworski (Tony Franklin kick)	0	7	
	Redskins	Mark Moseley 19-yard field goal	3	7	
	Redskins	Mark Moseley 22-yard field goal	6	7	
3rd	Eagles	Louie Giammona 1-yard rush (Tony Franklin kick)	6	14	
4th	Redskins	John Riggins 3-yard rush (Mark Moseley kick)	13	14	
	Eagles	Charlie A. Smith 29-yard pass from Ron Jaworski (Tony Franklin kick)	13	21	
	Eagles	Tony Franklin 28-yard field goal	13	24	
	Eagles	Safety, Clarke tackled Theismann in end zone	13	26	
	Eagles	Tony Franklin 36-yard field goal	13	29	
	Eagles	Greg Brown 7-yard fumble return (Tony Franklin kick)	13	36	

==== Week 5 ====
Monday, October 5, 1981 Kickoff 9:00 PM Eastern

Played at Veterans Stadium on AstroTurf playing surface weather= 62 °F (17 °C) (Clear)

	**1**	**2**	**3**	**4**	**Total**
Atlanta Falcons (3–2)	0	0	10	3	13
Philadelphia Eagles (5–0)	6	7	0	3	16

		**SCORING PLAYS**	**ATL**	**PHI**	**TIME**
1st	Eagles	Tony Franklin 36-yard field goal	0	3	
	Eagles	Tony Franklin 34-yard field goal	0	6	
2nd	Eagles	Charlie A. Smith 30-yard pass from Ron Jaworski (Tony Franklin kick)	0	13	
3rd	Falcons	Mick Luckhurst 35-yard field goal	3	13	
	Falcons	Kenny Johnson 20-yard fumble return (Mick Luckhurst kick)	10	13	
4th	Eagles	Tony Franklin 43-yard field goal	10	16	
	Falcons	Mick Luckhurst 43-yard field goal	13	16	

==== Week 6 ====
Sunday, October 11, 1981 Kickoff 12:00 PM Central

Played at Louisiana Superdome on an AstroTurf playing surface at 72 °F (22 °C) indoors

	**1**	**2**	**3**	**4**	**Total**
Philadelphia Eagles (6–0)	14	10	7	0	31
New Orleans Saints (1–5)	7	0	0	7	14

		**SCORING PLAYS**	**PHI**	**NO**	**TIME**
1st	Saints	George Rogers 5-yard rush (Benny Ricardo kick)	0	7	
	Eagles	Keith Krepfle 11-yard pass from Ron Jaworski (Tony Franklin kick)	7	7	
	Eagles	Booker Russell 1-yard rush (Tony Franklin kick)	14	7	
2nd	Eagles	Booker Russell 1-yard rush (Reggie Wilkes pass from Ron Jaworski)	21	7	
	Eagles	Tony Franklin 22-yard field goal	24	7	
3rd	Eagles	Frank LeMaster 47-yard fumble return (Tony Franklin kick)	31	7	
4th	Saints	George Rogers 3-yard rush (Benny Ricardo kick)	31	14	

==== Week 7 ====
Sunday, October 18, 1981 Kickoff 12:00 PM Central

Played at Metropolitan Stadium on a grass playing surface at 44 °F (7 °C) with a 27 mph (43 km/h) wind

	**1**	**2**	**3**	**4**	**Total**
Philadelphia Eagles (6–1)	6	3	0	14	23
Minnesota Vikings (5–2)	0	21	7	7	35

		**SCORING PLAYS**	**PHI**	**MIN**	**TIME**
1st	Eagles	Wilbert Montgomery 1-yard rush (kick failed)	6	0	
2nd	Vikings	Joe Senser 11-yard pass from Tommy Kramer (Rick Danmeier kick)	6	7	
	Eagles	Tony Franklin 30-yard field goal	9	7	
	Vikings	Sammy White 50-yard pass from Tommy Kramer (Rick Danmeier kick)	9	14	
	Vikings	Bob Bruer 1-yard pass from Tommy Kramer (Rick Danmeier kick)	9	21	
3rd	Vikings	Ahmad Rashad 5-yard pass from Tommy Kramer (Rick Danmeier kick)	9	28	
4th	Eagles	Wilbert Montgomery 25-yard pass from Ron Jaworski (Tony Franklin kick)	16	28	
	Vikings	Ted Brown 1-yard rush (Rick Danmeier kick)	16	35	
	Eagles	Harold Carmichael 21-yard pass from Ron Jaworski (Tony Franklin kick)	23	35	

==== Week 8 ====
Sunday, October 25, 1981 Kickoff 1:00 PM Eastern

Played at Veterans Stadium on an AstroTurf playing surface weather= 55 °F (13 °C) (Rain)

	**1**	**2**	**3**	**4**	**Total**
Tampa Bay Buccaneers (4–4)	7	0	0	3	10
Philadelphia Eagles (7–1)	0	7	0	13	20

		**SCORING PLAYS**	**TB**	**PHI**
1st	Buccaneers	Doug Williams 1-yard rush (Bill Capece kick)	7	0
2nd	Eagles	Keith Krepfle 6-yard pass from Ron Jaworski (Tony Franklin kick)	7	7
4th	Eagles	Tony Franklin 44-yard field goal	7	10
	Buccaneers	Bill Capece 29-yard field goal	10	10
	Eagles	Tony Franklin 32-yard field goal	10	13
	Eagles	Wilbert Montgomery 2-yard rush (Tony Franklin kick)	10	20

==== Week 9 ====
Sunday, November 1, 1981 Kickoff 4:00 PM Eastern

Played at Veterans Stadium on an AstroTurf playing surface weather= 60 °F (16 °C) (Cloudy)

	**1**	**2**	**3**	**4**	**Total**
Dallas Cowboys (8–1)	0	3	0	14	17
Philadelphia Eagles (7–2)	0	7	7	0	14

		**SCORING PLAYS**	**DAL**	**PHI**	**TIME**
2nd	Cowboys	Rafael Septien 21-yard field goal	3	0	
	Eagles	Wilbert Montgomery 2-yard rush (Tony Franklin kick)	3	7	
3rd	Eagles	Harold Carmichael 85-yard pass from Ron Jaworski (Tony Franklin kick)	3	14	
4th	Cowboys	Doug Cosbie 17-yard pass from Danny White (Rafael Septien kick)	10	14	
	Cowboys	Tony Dorsett 9-yard rush (Rafael Septien kick)	17	14	

==== Week 10 ====
Sunday, November 8, 1981 Kickoff 12:00 PM Central

Played at the Busch Memorial Stadium on an AstroTurf playing surface at 57 °F (14 °C) with an 8 mph (13 km/h) wind.

	**1**	**2**	**3**	**4**	**Total**
Philadelphia Eagles (8–2)	7	10	14	21	52
St. Louis Cardinals (3–7)	7	3	0	0	10

		**SCORING PLAYS**	**PHI**	**STL**	**TIME**
1st	Eagles	Wilbert Montgomery 19-yard pass from Ron Jaworski (Tony Franklin kick)	7	0	
	Cardinals	Mel Gray 42-yard pass from Jim Hart (Neil O'Donoghue kick)	7	7	
2nd	Cardinals	Neil O'Donoghue 21-yard field goal	7	10	
	Eagles	Rodney Parker 33-yard pass from Ron Jaworski (Tony Franklin kick)	14	10	
	Eagles	Tony Franklin 32-yard field goal	17	10	
3rd	Eagles	Harold Carmichael 14-yard pass from Ron Jaworski (Tony Franklin kick)	24	10	
	Eagles	Harold Carmichael 38-yard pass from Ron Jaworski (Tony Franklin kick)	31	10	
4th	Eagles	Billy Campfield 2-yard rush (Tony Franklin kick)	38	10	
	Eagles	Wally Henry 20-yard pass from Joe Pisarcik (Tony Franklin kick)	45	10	
	Eagles	Booker Russell 1-yard rush (Tony Franklin kick)	52	10	

==== Week 11 ====
Sunday, November 15, 1981 Kickoff 1:00 PM Eastern

Played at Veterans Stadium on AstroTurf weather= 54 °F (12 °C) (Light rain)

	**1**	**2**	**3**	**4**	**Total**
Baltimore Colts (1–10)	6	0	0	7	13
Philadelphia Eagles (9–2)	7	14	10	7	38

		**SCORING PLAYS**	**BAL**	**PHI**	**TEAM**
1st	Eagles	Keith Krepfle 15-yard pass from Ron Jaworski (Tony Franklin kick)	0	7	
2nd	Colts	Curtis Dickey 1-yard rush (kick failed)	6	7	
	Eagles	Wilbert Montgomery 5-yard rush (Tony Franklin kick)	6	14	
	Eagles	Wilbert Montgomery 1-yard rush (Tony Franklin kick)	6	21	
	Eagles	Tony Franklin 32-yard field goal	6	24	
	Eagles	Charlie A. Smith 30-yard pass from Ron Jaworski (Tony Franklin kick)	6	31	
4th	Colts	Zachary Dixon 17-yard pass from Bert Jones (Mike Wood kick)	13	31	
	Eagles	Wally Henry 44-yard pass from Joe Pisarcik (Tony Franklin kick)	13	38	

==== Week 12 ====
Sunday, November 22, 1981 Kickoff 1:00 PM Eastern

Played at Veterans Stadium on an AstroTurf playing surface weather= 46 °F (8 °C) (Cloudy)

	**1**	**2**	**3**	**4**	**Total**
New York Giants (8–4)	3	7	0	10	20
Philadelphia Eagles (9–3)	7	3	0	0	10

		**SCORING PLAYS**	**OAK**	**PHI**	**TIME**
1st	Giants	Joe Danelo 39-yard field goal	3	0	
	Eagles	Keith Krepfle 6-yard pass from Ron Jaworski (Tony Franklin kick)	3	7	
2nd	Giants	Leon Bright 1-yard rush (Joe Danelo kick)	10	7	
	Eagles	Tony Franklin 27-yard field goal	10	10	
4th	Giants	Joe Danelo 30-yard field goal	13	10	
	Giants	Terry Jackson 32-yard interception return (Joe Danelo kick)	20	10	

==== Week 13 ====
Monday, November 30, 1981 Kickoff 9:00 PM Pacific

Played at Orange Bowl on grass playing surface at 73 °F (23 °C) with an 8 mph (13 km/h) wind

	**1**	**2**	**3**	**4**	**Total**
Philadelphia Eagles (9–4)	7	0	3	0	10
Miami Dolphins (8–4–1)	0	3	0	10	13

		**SCORING PLAYS**	**PHI**	**MIA**	**TIME**
1st	Eagles	Wilbert Montgomery 1-yard rush (Tony Franklin kick)	7	0	
2nd	Dolphins	Uwe von Schamann 42-yard field goal	7	3	
3rd	Eagles	Tony Franklin 42-yard field goal	10	3	
4th	Dolphins	Duriel Harris 17-yard pass from Don Strock (Uwe von Schamann kick)	10	10	
	Dolphins	Uwe von Schamann 27-yard field goal	10	13	

==== Week 14 ====
Sunday, December 6, 1981 Kickoff 1:00 PM Eastern

Played at Robert F. Kennedy Memorial Stadium on a grass playing surface at 43 °F (6 °C) with a 21 mph (34 km/h) wind

	**1**	**2**	**3**	**4**	**Total**
Philadelphia Eagles (9–5)	0	13	0	0	13
Washington Redskins (6–8)	6	0	0	9	15

		**SCORING PLAYS**	**PHI**	**WAS**	**TIME**
1st	Redskins	Joe Washington 6-yard rush (kick failed)	0	6	
2nd	Eagles	Billy Campfield 25-yard pass from Ron Jaworski (Tony Franklin kick)	7	6	
	Eagles	Billy Campfield 5-yard pass from Ron Jaworski (kick failed)	13	6	
4th	Redskins	Mark Moseley 45-yard field goal	13	9	
	Redskins	Monte Coleman 52-yard interception return (kick failed)	13	15	

==== Week 15 ====
Sunday, December 13, 1981 Kickoff 3:00 PM Central

Played at Texas Stadium on an AstroTurf playing surface at 44 °F (7 °C) with a 9 mph (14 km/h) wind

	**1**	**2**	**3**	**4**	**Total**
Philadelphia Eagles (9–6)	3	7	0	0	10
Dallas Cowboys (12–3)	0	7	7	7	21

		**SCORING PLAYS**	**PHI**	**DAL**	**TIME**
1st	Eagles	Tony Franklin 50-yard field goal	3	0	
2nd	Eagles	Booker Russell 1-yard rush (Tony Franklin kick)	10	0	
	Cowboys	Tony Hill 8-yard pass from Danny White (Rafael Septien kick)	10	7	
3rd	Cowboys	Butch Johnson 36-yard pass from Danny White (Rafael Septien kick)	10	14	
4th	Cowboys	Ron Springs 12-yard rush (Rafael Septien kick)	10	21	

==== Week 16 ====
Sunday, December 21, 1981 Kickoff 1:00 PM Eastern

Played at Veterans Stadium on AstroTurf playing surface weather= 29 °F (−2 °C) (Sunny)

	**1**	**2**	**3**	**4**	**Total**
St. Louis Cardinals (7–9)	0	0	0	0	0
Philadelphia Eagles (10–6)	7	21	10	0	38

		**SCORING PLAYS**	**STL**	**PHI**	**TIME**
1st	Eagles	Charlie A. Smith 4-yard pass from Ron Jaworski (Tony Franklin kick)	0	7	
2nd	Eagles	Wilbert Montgomery 9-yard rush (Tony Franklin kick)	0	14	
	Eagles	Hubie Oliver 13-yard rush (Tony Franklin kick)	0	21	
	Eagles	Harold Carmichael 6-yard pass from Ron Jaworski (Tony Franklin kick)	0	28	
3rd	Eagles	Billy Campfield 29-yard pass from Ron Jaworski (Tony Franklin kick)	0	35	
	Eagles	Tony Franklin 44-yard field goal	0	38	

=== Standings ===
NFC East
	W	L	T	PCT	DIV	CONF	PF	PA	STK
Dallas Cowboys^{(2)}	12	4	0	.750	6–2	8–4	367	277	L1
Philadelphia Eagles^{(4)}	10	6	0	.625	4–4	7–5	368	221	W1
New York Giants^{(5)}	9	7	0	.563	5–3	8–6	295	257	W3
Washington Redskins	8	8	0	.500	3–5	6–6	347	349	W3
St. Louis Cardinals	7	9	0	.438	2–6	4–8	315	408	L2

== Postseason ==
=== Schedule ===
Round	Date	Opponent (seed)	Result	Record	Venue	Recap
Wild Card	December 27, 1981	New York Giants (5)	L 21–27	0–1	Veterans Stadium	Recap

=== Game summaries ===
==== NFC Wild Card Playoffs: vs. (5) New York Giants ====
NFC Wild Card Playoffs: (5) New York Giants at (4) Philadelphia Eagles – Game summary

Quarter	1	2	3	4	Total
Giants	20	7	0	0	27
Eagles	0	7	7	7	21

at Veterans Stadium, Philadelphia, Pennsylvania

- Date: December 27, 1981
- Game time: 3:30 p.m. EST
- Game weather: 40 °F (4 °C), drizzle
- Game attendance: 71,611
- Referee: Bob Frederic
- TV announcers (CBS): Pat Summerall (play-by-play) and John Madden (color commentator)

Game information

First quarter

- NYG – Leon Bright 9-yard pass from Scott Brunner (kick failed). Giants 6–0.
- NYG – John Mistler 4-yard pass from Scott Brunner (Joe Danelo kick). Giants 13–0.
- NYG – Mark Haynes recovered fumble in end zone (Joe Danelo kick). Giants 20–0.

Second quarter

- PHI – Harold Carmichael 15-yard pass from Ron Jaworski (Tony Franklin kick). Giants 20–7.
- NYG – Tom Mullady 22-yard pass from Scott Brunner (Joe Danelo kick). Giants 27–7.

Third quarter

- PHI – Wilbert Montgomery 1-yard run (Tony Franklin kick). Giants 27–14.

Fourth quarter

- PHI – Wilbert Montgomery 2-yard run (Tony Franklin kick). Giants 27–21.

Top passers

- NYG – Scott Brunner – 9/14, 96 yards, 3 TD, INT
- PHI – Ron Jaworski – 13/24, 154 yards, TD

Top rushers

- NYG – Rob Carpenter – 33 rushes, 161 yards
- PHI – Wilbert Montgomery – 18 rushes, 65 yards, 2 TD

Top receivers

- NYG – Rob Carpenter – 4 receptions, 32 yards
- PHI – Harold Carmichael – 2 receptions, 43 yards, TD
