= Mike Dennis (defensive back) =

American football player (born 1958)

No. 46, 22, 45
- Position: Cornerback

Personal information
- Born: June 7, 1958 (age 68); Los Angeles, California, U.S.
- Listed height: 5 ft 10 in (1.78 m)
- Listed weight: 190 lb (86 kg)

Career information
- High school: John Muir (Pasadena, California)
- College: Wyoming
- NFL draft: 1980: undrafted

Career history
- New York Giants (1980–1983); Kansas City Chiefs (1984)*; New York Jets (1984); San Diego Chargers (1984)
- * Offseason or practice squad member only

Career NFL statistics
- Interceptions: 6
- Fumble recoveries: 1
- Stats at Pro Football Reference

Michael Dwayne Dennis (born June 6, 1958) is an American former professional football player who was a defensive back in the National Football League (NFL) for the New York Giants, New York Jets and San Diego Chargers. He played college football for the Wyoming Cowboys.

Dennis had five interceptions as an undrafted rookie in 1980.

== NFL career statistics ==
Year	Team	GP	COMB	TOT	AST	SCK	FF	FR	YDs	INT	YDs	AVG	LNG	TD	PD
1980	NYG	13	-	-	-	-	-	-	-	5	68	-	28	0	-
1981	NYG	16	-	-	-	-	-	-	-	0	0	0	0	0	-
1982	NYG	9	-	-	-	-	-	1	-	0	0	0	0	0	-
1983	NYG	16	-	-	-	-	-	-	-	1	0	0	0	0	-
1984	NYJ SD	6	-	-	-	-	-	-	-	0	0	0	0	0	-
Total		60	-	-	-	-	-	1	-	6	68	-	0	0	-
