= Scott Brunner =

American football player (born 1957)

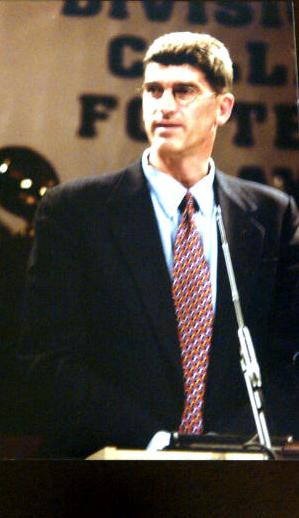

No. 12
- Position: Quarterback

Personal information
- Born: March 24, 1957 (age 69); Sellersville, Pennsylvania, U.S.
- Listed height: 6 ft 5 in (1.96 m)
- Listed weight: 205 lb (93 kg)

Career information
- High school: Henderson (West Goshen Township, Pennsylvania)
- College: Delaware
- NFL draft: 1980: 6th round, 145th overall pick

Career history
- New York Giants (1980–1983); Denver Broncos (1984); Green Bay Packers (1985)*; St. Louis Cardinals (1985)
- * Offseason or practice squad member only

Awards and highlights
- NCAA Division II national champion (1979); First-team All-American (1979); ECAC All-East Player of the Year (1979)

Career NFL statistics
- Passing attempts: 1,046
- Passing completions: 512
- Completion percentage: 48.9%
- TD–INT: 29–54
- Passing yards: 6,457
- Passer rating: 56.3
- Stats at Pro Football Reference

Scott Lee Brunner (born March 24, 1957) is an American former professional football player who was a quarterback in the National Football League (NFL) for the New York Giants from 1980 to 1983, the Denver Broncos in 1984, and the St. Louis Cardinals in 1985. He played college football for the Delaware Fightin' Blue Hens.

== Early life ==
Brunner was born in Sellersville, Pennsylvania, and grew up in Middletown, New York. By the time he started high school, the family had moved to West Chester, Pennsylvania. Brunner played high school football at Henderson High School in West Chester, Pennsylvania and Lawrence High School in Lawrenceville, New Jersey, where the family had moved before his junior year.

== College career ==
Brunner played under head coach Tubby Raymond and led the Delaware Fighting Blue Hens to the NCAA Division II Football Championship in his only year as a starter in 1979. Brunner earned first-team All-American honors by the American Football Coaches Association and was the Eastern College Athletic Conference All-East Player of the Year in 1979 when he threw for 2,401 yards and a then school record 24 touchdowns in leading Delaware to a 13–1 record and a national title game win over Youngstown State University. He also served as a backup in 1978 (behind future NFL player Jeff Komlo) and helped UD advance to the NCAA Division II championship game. Brunner was selected to the NCAA Division II Hall of Fame in 2002.

== Professional career ==
Brunner was selected by the New York Giants in the sixth round of the 1980 NFL draft. He replaced an injured Phil Simms during the 1981 season as the starting quarterback for the Giants. With Brunner leading them, the Giants beat the Philadelphia Eagles 20–10, but subsequently lost to the San Francisco 49ers 17–10. The Giants defeated the Los Angeles Rams 10–7 and the St. Louis Cardinals 20–10, setting up a season finale against the Dallas Cowboys, in which a win would clinch their first playoff berth since 1963. The Giants won the game 13–10 in overtime that gave the team their first playoff game in eighteen years. In the Wild Card game versus the Philadelphia Eagles that year, Brunner went 9-of-14 for 96 yards with three touchdowns and one interception while Rob Carpenter ran for a game-high 161 yards as the Giants forced two first quarter turnovers to build a 20–0 lead in an eventual 27–21 win over the Eagles, which was their first road postseason win in franchise history. In the Divisional Round versus the San Francisco 49ers, Brunner went 16-of-37 for 290 yards to go with three touchdowns and two interceptions to go with two fumbles as the 49ers led for most of the game in a 38–24 result.

The Giants were unable to build on their success in 1982, mainly due to the 1982 NFL Players strike that reduced the schedule to nine games. Ray Perkins left the Giants after the 1982 season and George Young's choice to replace Perkins was Bill Parcells, the Giants' defensive coordinator. Brunner was named the starter for the 1983 season opener against the Los Angeles Rams. Parcells chose Brunner over Simms, Jeff Rutledge and Mark Reed.

Brunner was traded to the Denver Broncos on April 27, 1984, in exchange for a fourth-round draft pick (used to select linebacker Gary Reasons) to serve as backup quarterback to John Elway. Brunner was placed on injured reserve with a knee infection, however, on August 29, 1984. He was traded to the Green Bay Packers on April 26, 1985, in exchange for a 1986 sixth round draft pick (used to select tight end Orson Mobley), but was again traded, this time to the Cardinals on August 26, 1985, for another 1986 sixth round pick (used to select linebacker Burnell Dent). After backing up Neil Lomax in 1985, Brunner was released by the Cardinals on August 27, 1986. In his NFL career, he played in 72 games and threw for 29 touchdowns. He rushed for one touchdown and passed for 6,457 yards.

== NFL career statistics ==
Legend
**Bold**	Career high

=== Regular season ===
Year	Team	Games			Passing									Rushing					Sacks	
Year	Team	GP	GS	Record	Cmp	Att	Pct	Yds	Y/A	Lng	TD	Int	Rtg	Att	Yds	Avg	Lng	TD	Sck	Yds
1980	NYG	**16**	3	1-2	52	112	46.4	610	5.4	50	4	6	53.1	10	18	1.8	12	0	10	76
1981	NYG	**16**	6	**4-2**	79	190	41.6	978	5.1	43	5	11	42.8	14	20	1.4	**23**	0	9	67
1982	NYG	9	9	**4-5**	161	298	**54.0**	2,017	**6.8**	47	**10**	9	**73.9**	19	27	1.4	10	**1**	17	130
1983	NYG	**16**	**12**	3-9	**190**	**386**	49.2	**2,516**	6.5	**62**	9	**22**	54.3	**26**	**64**	2.5	12	0	**31**	**218**
1985	STL	**16**	0	0-0	30	60	50.0	336	5.6	40	1	6	33.1	3	8	**2.7**	8	0	4	27
Career		73	30	12-18	512	1,046	48.9	6,457	6.2	62	29	54	56.3	72	137	1.9	23	1	71	518

=== Playoffs ===
Year	Team	Games			Passing									Rushing					Sacks	
Year	Team	GP	GS	Record	Cmp	Att	Pct	Yds	Y/A	Lng	TD	Int	Rtg	Att	Yds	Avg	Lng	TD	Sck	Yds
1981	NYG	2	2	1-1	25	51	49.0	386	7.6	72	6	3	89.2	8	9	1.1	11	0	3	13
Career		2	2	1-1	25	51	49.0	386	7.6	72	6	3	89.2	8	9	1.1	11	0	3	13

== Personal ==
For 15 years, Brunner served as vice president for an institutional stock research and portfolio management firm on Wall Street, and he is currently the executive vice president of Net Worth Management Group. He is a private quarterback coach and offensive coordinator of the TEST Football Academy in Martinsville, New Jersey. He tutored former Delaware quarterback Joe Flacco before the 2008 NFL draft, in which he was selected 18th overall by the Baltimore Ravens. Brunner had lived in Cranbury, New Jersey and lives with his wife in Millburn, New Jersey. He has three children.

== See also ==
- History of the New York Giants (1979–93)
