= Johnny Perkins =

American football player (1953–2007)

No. 86
- Position: Wide receiver

Personal information
- Born: April 21, 1953; Franklin, Texas, U.S.
- Died: April 25, 2007 (aged 54); Fort Worth, Texas, U.S.
- Listed height: 6 ft 2 in (1.88 m)
- Listed weight: 205 lb (93 kg)

Career information
- High school: Granbury (TX)
- College: Abilene Christian
- NFL draft: 1977: 2nd round, 32nd overall pick

Career history
- New York Giants (1977–1983)

Career NFL statistics
- Receptions: 163
- Receiving yards: 2,611
- Receiving touchdowns: 18
- Stats at Pro Football Reference

John Eugene Perkins (April 21, 1953 – April 25, 2007) was an American professional football player who spent his entire career as a wide receiver for the New York Giants of the National Football League (NFL). Perkins was born in Franklin, Texas. He played college football at Ranger College before transferring to Abilene Christian University. A second round pick in the 1977 NFL draft, Perkins played in 71 games and had 2,611 yards receiving and 18 touchdowns on 163 catches. He retired after the 1983 season. He died in Fort Worth, Texas after complications from heart surgery.

Perkins is the father of WNBA player Jia Perkins.

Johnny Perkins Field at Granbury High School in Granbury, TX, is the home field of the Granbury Pirates football team.

== NFL career statistics ==
Legend
**Bold**	Career high

=== Regular season ===
Year	Team	Games		Receiving				
Year	Team	GP	GS	Rec	Yds	Avg	Lng	TD
1977	NYG	13	7	20	279	14.0	54	0
1978	NYG	14	13	32	514	16.1	67	3
1979	NYG	13	6	20	337	**16.9**	38	4
1980	NYG	6	5	14	193	13.8	58	3
1981	NYG	**16**	**14**	**51**	**858**	16.8	**80**	**6**
1982	NYG	8	7	26	430	16.5	35	2
1983	NYG	1	0	0	0	0.0	0	0
		71	52	163	2,611	16.0	80	18

=== Playoffs ===
Year	Team	Games		Receiving				
Year	Team	GP	GS	Rec	Yds	Avg	Lng	TD
1981	NYG	**2**	**2**	**8**	**132**	**16.5**	**59**	**2**
		2	2	8	132	16.5	59	2
