= Floyd Eddings =

American football player (born 1958)

No. 88
- Position: Wide receiver

Personal information
- Born: December 15, 1958 (age 67); Birmingham, Alabama, U.S.
- Listed height: 5 ft 11 in (1.80 m)
- Listed weight: 177 lb (80 kg)

Career information
- High school: Phillips (Birmingham); Ganesna (Birmingham)
- College: California
- NFL draft: 1982: undrafted

Career history
- New York Giants (1982–1983)

Career NFL statistics
- Receptions: 28
- Receiving yards: 506
- Stats at Pro Football Reference

Floyd Eddings (born December 15, 1958) is an American former professional football player who was a wide receiver for the New York Giants of the National Football League (NFL) from 1982 to 1983. He played college football for the California Golden Bears.
