= Earnest Gray =

American football player (born 1957)

No. 83, 87
- Position: Wide receiver

Personal information
- Born: March 2, 1957 (age 69); Greenwood, Mississippi, U.S.
- Listed height: 6 ft 3 in (1.91 m)
- Listed weight: 195 lb (88 kg)

Career information
- High school: Greenwood (MS)
- College: Memphis
- NFL draft: 1979: 2nd round, 36th overall pick

Career history
- New York Giants (1979–1984); St. Louis Cardinals (1985)

Awards and highlights
- PFWA All-Rookie Team (1979)

Career NFL statistics
- Receptions: 246
- Receiving yards: 3,790
- Touchdowns: 27
- Stats at Pro Football Reference

Earnest L. Gray (born March 2, 1957) is an American former professional football player who was a wide receiver in the National Football League (NFL) for the New York Giants and St. Louis Cardinals. He played college football for the Memphis Tigers and was selected by the Giants in the second round of the 1979 NFL draft. He caught 78 passes for 1,139 yards and five touchdowns in 1983.

He played on a Giants team that in 1981 made the playoffs after an 18-year hiatus. He finished his career with 246 receptions for 3,790 yards and 27 touchdowns.

== NFL career statistics ==
Legend
**Bold**	Career high

=== Regular season ===
Year	Team	Games		Receiving				
Year	Team	GP	GS	Rec	Yds	Avg	Lng	TD
1979	NYG	**16**	14	28	537	**19.2**	53	4
1980	NYG	**16**	**16**	52	777	14.9	50	**10**
1981	NYG	**16**	3	22	360	16.4	45	2
1982	NYG	9	9	25	426	17.0	47	4
1983	NYG	**16**	**16**	**78**	**1,139**	14.6	**62**	5
1984	NYG	12	11	38	529	13.9	31	2
1985	STL	5	0	3	22	7.3	12	0
		90	69	246	3,790	15.4	62	27

=== Playoffs ===
Year	Team	Games		Receiving				
Year	Team	GP	GS	Rec	Yds	Avg	Lng	TD
1981	NYG	**2**	**2**	**4**	**130**	**32.5**	**72**	**1**
1984	NYG	**2**	1	2	20	10.0	11	0
		4	3	6	150	25.0	72	1
