= Billy Ard =

American football player (born 1959)

No. 67
- Position: Guard

Personal information
- Born: March 12, 1959 (age 67); East Orange, New Jersey, U.S.
- Listed height: 6 ft 3 in (1.91 m)
- Listed weight: 265 lb (120 kg)

Career information
- High school: Watchung Hills Regional (Warren Township, New Jersey)
- College: Wake Forest
- NFL draft: 1981: 8th round, 221st overall pick

Career history
- New York Giants (1981–1988); Green Bay Packers (1989–1991)

Awards and highlights
- Super Bowl champion (XXI); PFWA All-Rookie Team (1981); First-team All-ACC (1980)

Career NFL statistics
- Games played: 148
- Games started: 123
- Fumble recoveries: 4
- Stats at Pro Football Reference

William Donovan Ard (born March 12, 1959) is an American former professional football player who was a guard in the National Football League (NFL) for the New York Giants and Green Bay Packers. He played college football at Wake Forest University and was selected 221st overall in the eighth round of the 1981 NFL draft. He won the Super Bowl with the Giants in 1987.

Ard grew up in Watchung, New Jersey, where he attended Watchung Hills Regional High School. He lives in Watchung, New Jersey and works as a financial advisor at Morgan Stanley. Bill's other son, Brendan, broke records at his sport of choice, wrestling.
