= Clifford Chatman =

American football player (born 1959)

Clifford Chatman Sr
No. 31
- Position: Fullback

Personal information
- Born: March 13, 1959 (age 67); Clinton, Oklahoma, U.S.
- Listed height: 6 ft 2 in (1.88 m)
- Listed weight: 225 lb (102 kg)

Career information
- High school: Clinton
- College: Central State (OK)
- NFL draft: 1981: 4th round, 85th overall pick

Career history
- New York Giants (1982); Chicago Bears (1984)*
- * Offseason or practice squad member only

Career NFL statistics
- Rushing yards: 80
- Average: 3.6
- Rushing touchdowns: 2
- Stats at Pro Football Reference

Clifford D. Chatman (born March 13, 1959) is an American former professional football player who was a fullback in the National Football League (NFL) for the New York Giants. He played college football for the Central Oklahoma Bronchos and was selected 85th overall in the fourth round of the 1981 NFL draft.
