= Pat Hodgson =

American football player (born 1944)

No. 80
- Position: Wide receiver

Personal information
- Born: January 30, 1944 (age 82); Columbus, Georgia, U.S.

Career information
- High school: The Westminster Schools
- College: Georgia
- NFL draft: 1966: undrafted

Career history

Playing
- Washington Redskins (1966)

Coaching
- Georgia (1970) Offensive coordinator (freshmen); Florida State (1971) Wide receivers / tight ends coach; Georgia (1972–1977) Wide receivers / quarterbacks coach; Texas Tech (1978) Wide receivers coach (left before season began); San Diego Chargers (1978) Wide receivers coach; New York Giants (1979–1988) Wide receivers coach; Pittsburgh Steelers (1992–1995) Tight ends coach; New York Giants (1996–1998) Tight ends coach

Awards and highlights
- Super Bowl champion (XXI); Second-team All-SEC (1965)
- Stats at Pro Football Reference

Patrick Shannon Hodgson (born January 30, 1944) is an American former professional football wide receiver. He played in the National Football League (NFL) for the Washington Redskins in 1966. He played college football at the University of Georgia. After his career, he served as a position coach for multiple NFL teams.

== Coaching history ==
Hodgson served as a position coach for four National Football League teams between 1978 and 1997.

- 1978 San Diego Chargers (wide receivers coach)
- 1979–1987 New York Giants (wide receivers coach)
- 1992–1995 Pittsburgh Steelers (tight ends coach)
- 1996–1997 New York Jets (tight ends coach)

== Personal life ==
His grandfather (Morton) lettered in football in 1906 and was Georgia's first four-sport letter winner (football, basketball, baseball, and track). His father (Hutch) lettered in football in 1933. His son, Pat Jr., played football at Clarke Central and walked on for a year at Georgia, but he did not play.

After retiring from coaching he worked in I.T.
