= Joe McLaughlin (American football) =

American football player (born 1957)

No. 62, 52
- Position: Linebacker

Personal information
- Born: July 1, 1957 (age 69); Stoneham, Massachusetts, U.S.
- Listed height: 6 ft 1 in (1.85 m)
- Listed weight: 235 lb (107 kg)

Career information
- High school: Stoneham
- College: UMass
- NFL draft: 1979: undrafted

Career history
- New York Giants (1979)*; Green Bay Packers (1979); Buffalo Bills (1980)*; New York Giants (1980–1984)
- * Offseason or practice squad member only

Career NFL statistics
- Fumble recoveries: 1
- Stats at Pro Football Reference

Joseph James McLaughlin (born July 1, 1957) is a former linebacker in the National Football League. He was born in Stoneham, Massachusetts.

== Career ==
McLaughlin played with the Green Bay Packers during the 1979 NFL season before playing five seasons with the New York Giants. He played at the collegiate level at the University of Massachusetts Amherst.
