= Joe Danelo =

American football player (born 1953)

No. 18
- Position: Placekicker

Personal information
- Born: September 2, 1953 (age 73); Spokane, Washington, U.S.
- Listed height: 5 ft 9 in (1.75 m)
- Listed weight: 166 lb (75 kg)

Career information
- High school: Spokane (WA) Gonzaga Prep
- College: Washington State
- NFL draft: 1975: 10th round, 257th overall pick

Career history
- Green Bay Packers (1975); New York Giants (1976–1982); Buffalo Bills (1983–1984)

Career NFL statistics
- Field goals: 133
- Field goal attempts: 228
- Field goal %: 58.3
- Longest field goal: 55
- Stats at Pro Football Reference

Joseph Peter Danelo (born September 2, 1953) is an American former professional football player who was a placekicker in the National Football League (NFL) for ten seasons with the Green Bay Packers, New York Giants, and Buffalo Bills.

Born and raised in Spokane, Washington, Danelo graduated from Gonzaga Prep in 1971. He played college football at Washington State University in Pullman under head coach Jim Sweeney, and started for three seasons, setting records and earning second-team all-conference honors as a senior in 1974. He was selected 257th overall in the tenth round of the 1975 NFL draft by the Miami Dolphins.

== Professional career ==
The Dolphins kept Garo Yepremian and Danelo was back in Spokane when the Green Bay Packers called him to be a week-to-week injury replacement for Chester Marcol. He appeared in the season's final twelve games. With Marcol returning in 1976, Packer head coach Bart Starr promised a trade; Danelo pushed for the first-year expansion Seattle Seahawks, but wound up instead with the New York Giants.

In 1981, Danelo kicked a team-record 55-yard field goal for the Giants on September 20 (since broken), and tied the NFL record of six field goals (with no misses) on October 18 (also since broken) at the Kingdome in Seattle.

On December 19, 1981, Danelo kicked a game-winning 35-yard field goal in overtime against the Dallas Cowboys (after missing three in regulation and one in overtime, though he did kick the field goal that tied the game, sending it into overtime) that enabled both the Giants and the New York Jets to go to the playoffs for the first time in many years (after the Jets won their game against the Green Bay Packers the following day).

== Personal life ==
His youngest son was Mario Danelo (1985–2007), a USC Trojans placekicker.
