= Jeff Weston (American football) =

American football player (born 1956)

No. 73
- Position: Offensive tackle

Personal information
- Born: April 10, 1956 (age 70); Jersey City, New Jersey, U.S.
- Listed height: 6 ft 5 in (1.96 m)
- Listed weight: 259 lb (117 kg)

Career information
- High school: Cardinal Mooney (Greece, New York)
- College: Notre Dame
- NFL draft: 1979: 9th round, 244th overall pick

Career history
- Miami Dolphins (1979)*; New York Giants (1979-1982)
- * Offseason or practice squad member only

Awards and highlights
- National champion (1977)

Career NFL statistics
- Games played: 37
- Games started: 10
- Stats at Pro Football Reference

Jeffrey Graham Weston (born April 10, 1956) is an American former professional football player who was an offensive tackle in the National Football League (NFL) for the New York Giants from 1979 to 1982 for a total of 37 career games. He played college football for the Notre Dame Fighting Irish.
