= Bill Neill =

American football player (born 1959)

No. 77
- Position: Defensive tackle

Personal information
- Born: March 15, 1959 (age 67); Morristown, New Jersey, U.S.
- Listed height: 6 ft 4 in (1.93 m)
- Listed weight: 258 lb (117 kg)

Career information
- College: Pittsburgh
- NFL draft: 1981: 5th round, 115th overall pick

Career history
- New York Giants (1981–1983); Green Bay Packers (1984)

Awards and highlights
- PFWA All-Rookie Team (1981); First-team All-East (1980)

Career NFL statistics
- Sacks: 8.5
- Fumble recoveries: 1
- Stats at Pro Football Reference

William M. Neill (born March 15, 1959) is an American former professional football player who was a nose tackle in the National Football League (NFL) for the New York Giants and the Green Bay Packers. Neill played college football for the Pittsburgh Panthers before being selected by the Giants in the fifth round of the 1981 NFL draft. He played four seasons in the NFL and retired in 1984.
