= Curtis McGriff =

American football player (born 1958)

No. 76, 74
- Positions: Defensive tackle, nose tackle

Personal information
- Born: May 17, 1958 (age 68); Donalsonville, Georgia, U.S.
- Listed height: 6 ft 5 in (1.96 m)
- Listed weight: 270 lb (122 kg)

Career information
- High school: Cottonwood (Cottonwood, Alabama)
- College: Alabama
- NFL draft: 1980: undrafted

Career history
- New York Giants (1980–1986); Washington Redskins (1987)

Awards and highlights
- Super Bowl champion (XXI); 2× National champion (1978, 1979)

Career NFL statistics
- Fumble recoveries: 1
- Stats at Pro Football Reference

Curtis McGriff (born May 17, 1958) is an American former professional football player who was a defensive lineman in the National Football League (NFL) for the New York Giants and the Washington Redskins. He played college football for the Alabama Crimson Tide.

== Early life ==
McGriff grew up in rural Houston County, Alabama in the southeastern corner of the state. He attended and played football at Cottonwood High School in Cottonwood, Alabama graduating in 1976. He played college football at the University of Alabama in Tuscaloosa, Alabama for the legendary coach Paul "Bear" Bryant from 1976 to 1979. McGriff was an interior defensive lineman for the 1978 squad that defeated Penn State in the famous “goal line stand” Sugar Bowl. He was also part of the 1979 team that repeated as undisputed national champions, punctuated by a win over Arkansas in the Sugar Bowl.

== Professional career ==
McGriff entered the NFL and signed with the New York Giants in 1980 as a defensive lineman. He made the NFL's all-rookie team that year and was a member of the Giants' 1986-1987 Super Bowl Championship team. McGriff was primarily used as a defensive tackle and rotated into the game on downs when a running play was anticipated (McGriff would be rotated out of the game and a pass-rush specialist would be brought into the game on passing downs.) He played his final season (1987) with the Washington Redskins.

== After football ==
Formerly, McGriff lived in Hackensack, New Jersey in the New York metropolitan area. He was often seen at charity event such as Kidney Benefits with close friend and fellow Alabama player, Don McNeal, who played cornerback for the Miami Dolphins from 1980–1989. On May 15, 2005, McGriff married his longtime girlfriend Maurie Morris. He taught at a correctional school in Lodi, New Jersey. Mr. McGriff now lives in Dothan, Alabama.
