= Larry Flowers (American football) =

American football player (born 1958)

No. 37, 38
- Position: Safety

Personal information
- Born: April 19, 1958 (age 68); Temple, Texas, U.S.
- Listed height: 6 ft 1 in (1.85 m)
- Listed weight: 190 lb (86 kg)

Career information
- High school: Temple
- College: Texas Tech
- NFL draft: 1980: 4th round, 102nd overall pick

Career history
- Tampa Bay Buccaneers (1980)*; New York Giants (1981–1985); New York Jets (1985)
- * Offseason or practice squad member only

Awards and highlights
- Second-team All-SWC (1978)

Career NFL statistics
- Interceptions: 2
- Fumble recoveries: 3
- Sacks: 1
- Stats at Pro Football Reference

Larry Darnell Flowers (born April 19, 1958) is an American former professional football player who was a safety for five seasons with the New York Giants and the New York Jets of the National Football League (NFL). He played college football for the Texas Tech Red Raiders, was one of the top tacklers, and was named to the All-Southwest Conference first team twice.

According to Jets special teams coach Larry Pasquale, Flowers was "one of the best special teams players in the game", citing the fact that he played the middle on kick returns and on the end on punt returns.
