= Mike Whittington =

American football player (born 1958)

No. 58, 62
- Position: Linebacker

Personal information
- Born: August 9, 1958 (age 68); Miami, Florida, U.S.
- Listed height: 6 ft 2 in (1.88 m)
- Listed weight: 220 lb (100 kg)

Career information
- High school: Christopher Columbus
- College: Notre Dame
- NFL draft: 1980: undrafted

Career history
- New York Giants (1980–1983); Memphis Showboats (1984-1985)

Awards and highlights
- National champion (1977)

Career NFL statistics
- Sacks: 1.5
- Fumble recoveries: 4
- Stats at Pro Football Reference

Michael Scott Whittington (born August 9, 1958) is an American former professional football player who was a linebacker for the New York Giants of the National Football League (NFL). He played college football for the Notre Dame Fighting Irish.
