= Bruce Kimball (American football) =

American football player (born 1956)

No. 63, 67
- Position: Guard

Personal information
- Born: August 19, 1956 (age 70); Beverly, Massachusetts, U.S.
- Listed height: 6 ft 2 in (1.88 m)
- Listed weight: 260 lb (118 kg)

Career information
- High school: Triton (Newbury, Massachusetts)
- College: UMass
- NFL draft: 1979: 7th round, 192nd overall pick

Career history
- Toronto Argonauts (1979–1980); New York Giants (1982); Washington Redskins (1983–1984)

Awards and highlights
- UMASS Athletics Hall of Fame, 2000 inductee

Career NFL statistics
- Games played: 25
- Games started: 1
- Stats at Pro Football Reference

Bruce Michael Kimball (born August 19, 1956) is an American former professional football player who was an offensive lineman in the National Football League (NFL) for the New York Giants and Washington Redskins.

He played college football for the UMass Minutemen and was selected by the Pittsburgh Steelers in the seventh round of the 1979 NFL draft. He played two seasons in the Canadian Football League (CFL) before playing in the NFL. He was inducted in the UMass Athletic Hall of Fame in 2000.
