= Mark Reed (quarterback, born 1959) =

American football player (born 1959)

No. 8
- Position: Quarterback

Personal information
- Born: February 21, 1959 (age 67); Moorhead, Minnesota, U.S.
- Listed height: 6 ft 3 in (1.91 m)
- Listed weight: 201 lb (91 kg)

Career information
- High school: Moorhead
- College: Moorhead State (MN)
- NFL draft: 1981: 8th round, 207th overall pick

Career history
- New York Giants (1981–1982); Los Angeles Rams (1983)*; Baltimore Colts (1983); New York Jets (1984)*
- * Offseason or practice squad member only
- Stats at Pro Football Reference

Mark David Reed (born February 21, 1959) is an American former professional football player who was a quarterback for the Baltimore Colts of the National Football League (NFL). He played college football for the Moorhead State Dragons.
