= Bill Currier =

American football player (born 1955)

No. 20, 28, 29
- Position: Safety

Personal information
- Born: January 1, 1955 (age 71); Glen Burnie, Maryland, U.S.
- Listed height: 6 ft 0 in (1.83 m)
- Listed weight: 196 lb (89 kg)

Career information
- High school: Glen Burnie
- College: South Carolina
- NFL draft: 1977: 9th round, 232nd overall pick

Career history
- Houston Oilers (1977–1979); New England Patriots (1980); New York Giants (1981–1985)

Awards and highlights
- PFWA All-Rookie Team (1977)

Career NFL statistics
- Interceptions: 11
- Defensive touchdowns: 1
- Sacks: 6
- Stats at Pro Football Reference

William Frank Currier (born January 1, 1955) is an American former professional football player who was a safety in the National Football League (NFL) for the Houston Oilers, New England Patriots, and New York Giants. He played college football at the University of South Carolina and was selected in the ninth round of the 1977 NFL draft. Since 1992, he has been athletic director at Ben Lippen School in Columbia, South Carolina.
