= Rob Carpenter (running back) =

American football player (born 1955)

No. 26, 38
- Position: Running back

Personal information
- Born: April 20, 1955 (age 71); Lancaster, Ohio, U.S.
- Listed height: 6 ft 1 in (1.85 m)
- Listed weight: 224 lb (102 kg)

Career information
- High school: Lancaster
- College: Miami (OH)
- NFL draft: 1977: 3rd round, 84th overall pick

Career history
- Houston Oilers (1977–1981); New York Giants (1981-1985); Los Angeles Rams (1986)

Awards and highlights
- PFWA All-Rookie Team (1977); 2× First-team All-MAC (1975, 1976)

Career NFL statistics
- Rushing attempts: 1,172
- Rushing yards: 4,363
- Receptions: 215
- Receiving yards: 1,707
- Total TDs: 34
- Stats at Pro Football Reference

Robert Joseph Carpenter, Jr. (born April 20, 1955) is an American former professional football player who was a running back for 10 seasons in the National Football League (NFL). He is the father of linebacker Bobby Carpenter, former linebacker at Ohio State University, former University of Cincinnati linebacker Johnathan Carpenter, former Marshall University linebacker George Carpenter, and former Ohio defensive back Nathan Carpenter. He currently resides in Lancaster, Ohio but retired as gym teacher at Lancaster High School. He now spends his time tending to his family and farm.

== College career ==
Carpenter played for the Miami RedHawks from 1973 to 1976, where he was a three-year letterman. He played for two Mid-American Conference championship teams in 1974 and 1975. In his final two seasons, he made first team All-MAC, and was an honorable mention on the College Football All-America Team, rushing for 1,142 yards as a Junior and 1,064 yards as a senior. In four seasons for the RedHawks, Carpenter rushed for 2,909 yards and 28 touchdowns, while also catching 35 passes for 315 yards and two more scores. Carpenter was inducted into Miami's athletic Hall of Fame in 1988.

== NFL career ==
=== Houston Oilers ===
Carpenter was selected by the Houston Oilers in the third round of the 1977 draft. After a solid 652-yard rushing season as a rookie, Carpenter spent most of his next three seasons as a blocking fullback for Houston's new star running back Earl Campbell, though he still managed to rush for over 340 yards in each one. In a 1979 divisional playoff game against the San Diego Chargers, Carpenter filled in for an injured Campbell, leading the team in rushing with 67 yards while also catching four passes for 23 yards in a 17–14 upset victory, despite being barely recovered from a knee injury himself and was still in crutches, reportedly did not take a painkiller in order to "feel the pain."

=== New York Giants ===
In 1981, Carpenter was traded to the New York Giants after the fourth week for a third round draft pick. He went on to have the best season of his career, rushing for a career high 822 yards, including four 100-yard games, before going on to lead the Giants to their first playoff victory in decades, carrying the ball 33 times for a franchise postseason record 161 yards while also catching four passes for 32 in a 27–21 win over the Philadelphia Eagles. Carpenter called the game "the greatest football day of my life". Carpenter went on to rush for 61 yards and catch 3 passes for 18 in New York's loss to San Francisco in the following week. He continued playing for the Giants until 1985.

=== Los Angeles Rams ===
After spending the 1986 season with the Los Angeles Rams, Carpenter called it a career.

He retired with 6,070 career yards from scrimmage and 34 touchdowns.

==== Mentorship of John Tuggle ====
In his final years on the Giants, Carpenter served as a mentor to fullback John Tuggle, who was the last pick of the 1983 NFL draft. Carpenter helped Tuggle became the first player ever picked last in the draft to make the NFL on the team that drafted him, and Tuggle ended up relieving him as starting fullback when he suffered an injury in week 13.

Tuggle was diagnosed with cancer in the offseason and never played again, dying on August 30, 1986, just prior to the opening of the Giants season. The Giants would go on to win Super Bowl XXI that season, their first world championship since 1956.

Carpenter said the experience with Tuggle affected him significantly, telling the New York Times "I think about him every day. I loved his enthusiasm right away. He was very positive and friendly, so I tried to get him that fifth running back spot on the team."

Carpenter also said Tuggle's struggle with cancer influenced his decision to leave the team in 1985. "I had a hard time dealing with it," he said. "Since I felt so responsible for his making the team, I felt I had to get out of there."

== NFL career statistics ==
Legend
**Bold**	Career high

=== Regular season ===
Year	Team	Games		Rushing					Receiving				
Year	Team	GP	GS	Att	Yds	Avg	Lng	TD	Rec	Yds	Avg	Lng	TD
1977	HOU	11	7	144	652	**4.5**	**77**	1	23	156	6.8	27	0
1978	HOU	11	2	82	348	4.2	20	5	17	150	8.8	37	0
1979	HOU	16	0	92	355	3.9	13	3	16	116	7.3	22	1
1980	HOU	15	1	97	359	3.7	46	3	**43**	**346**	8.0	25	0
1981	HOU	4	4	18	74	4.1	20	0	13	80	6.2	33	1
1981	NYG	10	9	190	748	3.9	35	5	24	201	8.4	37	0
1982	NYG	5	5	67	204	3.0	23	1	7	29	4.1	11	0
1983	NYG	10	10	170	624	3.7	37	4	26	258	**9.9**	**38**	**2**
1984	NYG	16	16	**250**	**795**	3.2	22	**7**	26	209	8.0	19	1
1985	NYG	14	11	60	201	3.4	46	0	20	162	8.1	23	0
1986	RAM	6	0	2	3	1.5	3	0	0	0	0.0	0	0
		118	65	1,172	4,363	3.7	77	29	215	1,707	7.9	38	5

=== Postseason ===
Year	Team	Games		Rushing					Receiving				
Year	Team	GP	GS	Att	Yds	Avg	Lng	TD	Rec	Yds	Avg	Lng	TD
1979	HOU	3	1	34	126	3.7	11	0	**12**	**72**	6.0	14	0
1980	HOU	1	0	5	9	1.8	4	0	3	26	8.7	14	0
1981	NYG	2	2	**50**	**222**	4.4	**21**	0	7	50	7.1	15	0
1984	NYG	2	2	16	24	1.5	8	**1**	**12**	45	3.8	8	0
1985	NYG	2	2	4	25	**6.3**	12	0	6	60	**10.0**	**16**	0
		10	7	109	406	3.7	21	1	40	253	6.3	16	0
