= Mark Haynes =

American football player (born 1958)

No. 36
- Position: Cornerback

Personal information
- Born: November 6, 1958 (age 67); Kansas City, Kansas, U.S.
- Listed height: 5 ft 11 in (1.80 m)
- Listed weight: 194 lb (88 kg)

Career information
- High school: J. C. Harmon (Kansas City)
- College: Colorado
- NFL draft: 1980: 1st round, 8th overall pick

Career history
- New York Giants (1980–1985); Denver Broncos (1986–1989)

Awards and highlights
- 2× First-team All-Pro (1982, 1984); 3× Pro Bowl (1982, 1983, 1984); 78th greatest New York Giant of all-time; First-team All-American (1979); 2× First-team All-Big Eight (1978, 1979)

Career NFL statistics
- Interceptions: 17
- Sacks: 1
- Touchdowns: 1
- Stats at Pro Football Reference

Mark Haynes (born November 6, 1958) is an American former professional football player who was a cornerback in the National Football League (NFL) who played for the New York Giants and the Denver Broncos from 1980 until 1989. He made three Pro Bowls while playing for New York and appeared in all three of Denver's Super Bowl teams in the 1980s, the first coming against the Giants.

Haynes was a first-round draft pick of the Giants in the 1980 NFL draft and was instrumental in their 1981 playoff run, which saw the Giants make the playoffs for the first time since 1963.

He had one career touchdown on an interception return, which took place during the 1987 season. In the 1984 season Haynes had seven interceptions and was named first-team All-Pro. He ended his career with seventeen total interceptions and four fumble recoveries.
