= Tom Mullady =

American football player (born 1957)

No. 81
- Positions: Tight end, wide receiver

Personal information
- Born: January 30, 1957 (age 69); Dayton, Ohio, U.S.
- Listed height: 6 ft 3 in (1.91 m)
- Listed weight: 232 lb (105 kg)

Career information
- High school: The McCallie School (Chattanooga, Tennessee)
- College: Rhodes
- NFL draft: 1979: 7th round, 170th overall pick

Career history
- New York Giants (1979–1984)

Career NFL statistics
- Receptions: 84
- Receiving yards: 1,033
- Touchdowns: 4
- Stats at Pro Football Reference

Thomas Francis Mullady (born January 30, 1957) is an American former professional football player who was a tight end and wide receiver for the New York Giants of the National Football League (NFL) from 1979 to 1984. He played college football for the Rhodes Lynx and was selected 170th overall by the Buffalo Bills in the seventh round of the 1979 NFL draft.

Mullady graduated from The McCallie School in Chattanooga, Tennessee. in 1975 where he was a member of the varsity football team. His teammate at McCallie, Ed Smith (linebacker), also went on to a successful pro football career.
