= John Mistler =

American football player (born 1958)

No. 85, 29, 84
- Position: Wide receiver

Personal information
- Born: October 28, 1958 (age 68); Columbia, Missouri, U.S.
- Listed height: 6 ft 2 in (1.88 m)
- Listed weight: 186 lb (84 kg)

Career information
- High school: Sahuaro (Tucson, Arizona)
- College: Arizona State
- NFL draft: 1981: 3rd round, 59th overall pick

Career history
- New York Giants (1981–1984); Buffalo Bills (1984); Arizona Outlaws (1985)

Awards and highlights
- Second-team All-Pac-10 (1980)

Career NFL statistics
- Receptions: 72
- Receiving yards: 737
- Touchdowns: 3
- Stats at Pro Football Reference

John Andrew Mistler (born October 28, 1958) is an American former professional football player who was a wide receiver in the National Football League (NFL) for the New York Giants and the Buffalo Bills in addition to the Arizona Outlaws of the United States Football League (USFL). He was selected in the third round of the 1981 NFL draft by the Giants out of Arizona State University.

Mistler worked as a color analyst on Arizona Cardinals radio broadcasts from 1994 to 2005. He was inducted into the Sahuaro High School Alumni (Cougar Foundation) Hall of Fame in 1999.
