= Nebraska Cornhuskers baseball honors and awards =

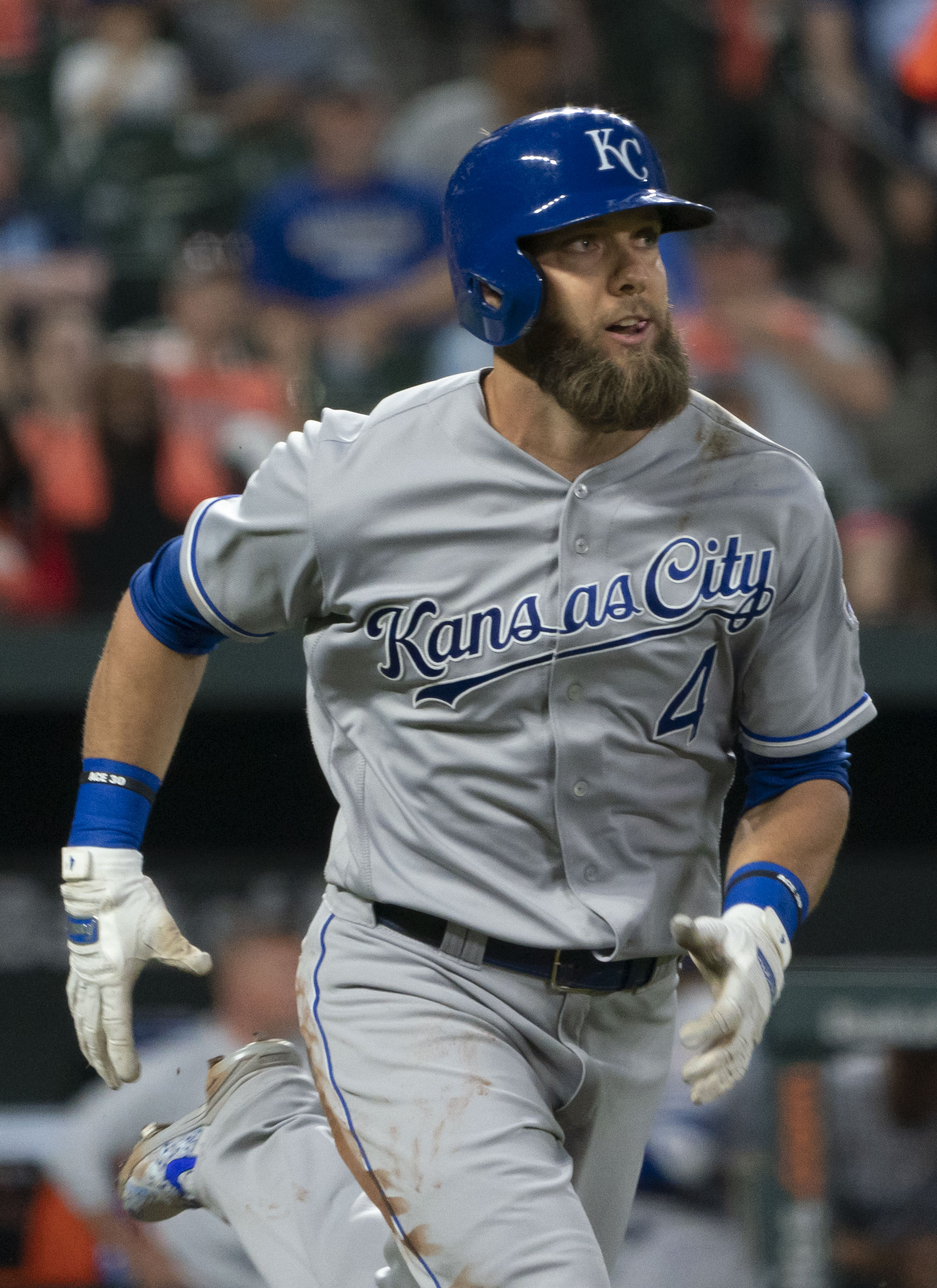
Alex Gordon won the 2005 Golden Spikes Award as the country's best amateur player

This is a list of Nebraska Cornhuskers baseball honors and awards. The program began play in 1889.

Nineteen Nebraska players have been named first-team All-Americans and Alex Gordon won the 2005 Golden Spikes Award as the country's best amateur player. Ten Cornhuskers have been named conference player or pitcher of the year across the Big Eight, Big 12, and Big Ten.

== National awards ==
=== Player of the year ===
- Golden Spikes Award: Alex Gordon (2005)
- Dick Howser Trophy: Alex Gordon (2005)
- ABCA: Alex Gordon (2005)
- Brooks Wallace Award: (Note: The Brooks Wallace Award was created in 2004 to honor the most outstanding collegiate player in the country. In 2009, the award began to honor the country's best shortstop.) Alex Gordon (2005)

=== Coach of the year ===
- Baseball America: Dave Van Horn (2001)

=== Other national awards ===
- John Olerud Award: (Note: The John Olerud Award was created in 2010 to honor the best two-way player in the country.): Spencer Schwellenbach (2021)
- Easton Redline Defensive Player of the Year: Ken Harvey (1999)
- NCBWA district player of the year: Shane Komine (2000), Dan Johnson (2001), Jeff Leise (2002), Matt Hopper (2003), Alex Gordon (2004, 2005), Luke Gorsett (2006), Max Anderson (2023), Brett Sears (2024)

== Conference awards ==
=== Player of the year ===
- Big Eight: Darin Erstad (1995)
- Big 12: Shane Komine (2000), Jed Morris (2002), Matt Hopper (2003), Alex Gordon (2004, 2005)
- Big Ten: Spencer Schwellenbach (2021)

=== Pitcher of the year ===
- Big 12: Shane Komine (2001), Aaron Marsden (2003)
- Big Ten: Brett Sears (2024)

=== Freshman of the year ===
- Big 12: Shane Komine (1999), Matt Hopper (2000), Johnny Dorn (2005)
- Big Ten: Chad Luensmann (2016), Max Anderson (2021)

=== Newcomer of the year ===
- Big 12: Dan Johnson (2000), Aaron Marsden (2002), Joba Chamberlain (2005)

=== Coach of the year ===
- Big 12: Dave Van Horn (2001), Mike Anderson (2003, 2005)
- Big Ten: Darin Erstad (2017), Will Bolt (2021)

== All-Americans ==
Nebraska has had forty-six players account for fifty-two All-America selections, including nineteen first-team awards, from the ABCA, Baseball America, Baseball Weekly, Collegiate Baseball Newspaper, the NCBWA, Perfect Game, and Sporting News. The program has also received seventeen freshman All-America awards.

=== First-team ===
- Bob Cerv, OF – 1950
- Don Brown, 3B – 1955
- Gene Stohs, OF – 1972
- Steve Stanicek, 1B – 1982
- Paul Meyers, OF – 1986
- Troy Brohawn, P – 1993
- Marc Sagmoen, OF – 1993
- Darin Erstad, OF – 1995
- Ken Harvey, 1B – 1999
- Shane Komine, P – 2000, 2001
- John Cole, OF/2B – 2001
- Dan Johnson, 1B – 2001
- Matt Hopper, DH – 2001
- Jeff Leise, OF – 2002
- Jed Morris, C – 2002
- Alex Gordon, 3B – 2004, 2005
- Spencer Schwellenbach, SS/P – 2021

=== Second-team ===
- Bob Churchich, IF – 1966
- Bob Munson, OF – 1973
- Paul Meyers, OF – 1985
- Shane Komine, P – 2002
- Matt Hopper, 1B – 2003
- Aaron Marsden, P – 2003
- Luke Gorsett, OF – 2006
- Cody Asche, 3B – 2011
- Jake Hohensee – 2018
- Max Anderson, 2B – 2023
- Brice Matthews, SS – 2023
- Brett Sears, P – 2024

=== Third-team ===
- Bob Diers, OF – 1951
- Jerry Dunn, OF – 1952
- Ray Novak, P – 1952
- Fred Seger, IF – 1954
- Bill Giles, 1B – 1955
- Stan Bahnsen, P – 1965
- Dan Boever, OF – 1983
- Mike Duncan, 1B – 1985
- Bill McGuire, C – 1985
- Kevin Jordan, 2B – 1990
- Todd Sears, 1B – 1997
- Justin Cowan, C – 2000
- Matt Hopper, DH – 2000
- Joba Chamberlain, P – 2005
- Johnny Dorn, P – 2005, 2008
- Ryan Wehrle, SS – 2006
- Tony Watson, P – 2006
- Michael Pritchard, DH – 2012
- Chance Sinclair, P – 2014
- Jake Meyers, UTL – 2017
- Scott Schreiber, 1B – 2018

=== Freshman ===
- Bobby Benjamin, OF – 1988
- Darin Petersen, SS – 1992
- Todd Sears, 1B – 1995
- Shane Komine, P – 1999
- Matt Hopper, DH – 2000
- Jamie Rodrigue, P – 2000
- Alex Gordon, 3B – 2003
- Tim Schoeninger, P – 2003
- Johnny Dorn, P – 2005
- Tony Watson, P – 2005
- Kyle Kubat, P – 2012
- Pat Kelly, 2B – 2012
- Ryan Boldt, OF – 2014
- Chad Luensmann, P – 2016
- Colby Gomes, P – 2019
- Leighton Banjoff, DH – 2020
- Max Anderson, 3B – 2021

== All-conference selections ==
=== First-team ===
- Larry Lewis, OF – 1958
- Gene Torczon, OF – 1958
- Jim Kane, C – 1958
- Dwight Siebler, P – 1958
- Ken Ruisinger, 1B – 1959
- Steve Smith, OF – 1962
- Don Purcell, C – 1962
- Stan Bahnsen, P – 1965
- Bob Brand, 1B – 1966
- Bob Churchich, 3B – 1966
- Alex Walter, OF – 1966
- Gary Neibauer, P – 1966
- Sam Sharpe, 2B – 1972
- Gene Stohs, OF – 1972
- Bob Munson, OF – 1973
- Paul Haas, OF – 1977
- Steve McManaman, DH – 1977
- Joe Scherger, OF – 1979, 1980
- Jeff Hunter, 3B – 1980
- Tim Burke, P – 1980
- Chris Chavez, SS – 1981
- Roger Hill, CF – 1981, 1982
- Steve Stanicek, 1B – 1982
- Anthony Kelley, P – 1982
- Dan Boever, 1B – 1983
- Bill McGuire, C/RP – 1984, 1985
- Scott Hooper, 3B – 1984
- Mike Duncan, 1B – 1984
- Larry Mims, SS – 1985
- Paul Meyers, OF – 1985, 1986
- Phil Harrison, P – 1986
- Ken Ramos, OF – 1988
- Jeff Taylor, 1B – 1988
- Pat Leinen, P – 1988
- Bobby Benjamin, 1B – 1990
- Kevin Jordan, UTL – 1990
- Dave Matranga, P – 1990, 1991
- Bill Vosik, 3B – 1991
- Jeff Murphy, C – 1992
- Steve Boyd, P – 1993
- Troy Brohawn, DH/SP – 1993
- Marc Sagmoen, OF – 1993
- Derek Dukart, 3B – 1994
- Darin Erstad, OF – 1994, 1995
- Mike Bellows, P – 1994
- Alvie Shepherd, DH – 1995
- Jonas Armenta, P – 1995
- Todd Sears, UTL – 1997
- Francis Collins, OF – 1997
- Ken Harvey, 1B – 1999
- Justin Cowan, C – 2000
- Shane Komine, P – 2000, 2001
- Matt Hopper, DH – 2000, 2001
- Dan Johnson, 1B – 2000, 2001
- John Cole, OF/2B – 2001
- Thom Ott, P – 2001
- Jeff Leise, OF – 2002
- Aaron Marsden, P – 2002, 2003
- Jed Morris, C – 2002
- Matt Hopper, 1B – 2003
- Curtis Ledbetter, DH/1B – 2003, 2005
- Quinton Robertson, P – 2003
- Alex Gordon, 3B – 2004, 2005
- Johnny Dorn, P – 2005, 2008
- Joba Chamberlain, P – 2005
- Brandon Buckman, 1B – 2006
- Ryan Wehrle, SS – 2006
- Luke Gorsett, OF – 2006
- Tony Watson, P – 2006
- Brett Jensen, P – 2006
- Jake Opitz, 2B – 2008
- Mitch Abeita, C – 2008
- Adam Bailey, OF – 2010
- Cody Asche, 3B – 2011
- Chad Christensen, SS – 2012, 2013
- Rich Sanguinetti, OF – 2012
- Michael Pritchard, DH/OF – 2012, 2014
- Pat Kelly, 2B – 2013, 2014
- Chance Sinclair, P – 2014
- Scott Schreiber, 1B/DH – 2016, 2017
- Jake Meyers, UTL – 2017
- Spencer Schwellenbach, RP – 2021
- Luke Roskam, C – 2021
- Jaxon Hallmark, OF – 2021
- Cade Povich, SP – 2021
- Max Anderson, 2B – 2023
- Brice Matthews, SS – 2023
- Brett Sears, SP – 2024

=== Second-team ===
- Kirk Eymann, P – 1977
- Joe Scherger, OF – 1977, 1978
- Dan Dixon, OF – 1978
- Tim Burke, P – 1979
- Stan Haas, OF – 1980
- Cliff Faust, P – 1980
- Larry Mims, 2B – 1986
- Ron Crowe, 3B – 1987
- Todd Bunge, OF – 1987
- Steve Spurgeon, P – 1987
- Bobby Benjamin, OF – 1988
- Joe Federico, DH – 1988
- Ken Ramos, OF – 1989
- Doug Twitty, UTL – 1989
- Bill Vosik, 3B – 1990
- Shawn Buchanan, OF – 1990
- Brian McArn, OF – 1991
- Mike Zajeski, P – 1991
- Brian Martin, P – 1993
- Sean McKenna, C – 1993
- Troy Brohawn, P – 1994
- Bob Courter, P – 1995
- Jed Dalton, 3B – 1995
- Mel Motley, OF – 1995
- Darin Petersen, SS – 1995
- Craig Sanders, P – 1995
- Francis Collins, OF – 1996
- Spencer Van Linge, P – 1996
- Ken Harvey, DH – 1998
- Adam Stern, OF – 2000
- Jeff Leise, OF – 2001, 2003
- Jed Morris, C – 2001
- Zach Kroenke, P – 2004, 2005
- Jake Mullinax, 2B – 2004
- Justin Pekarek, P – 2004
- Joe Simokaitis, SS – 2005
- Daniel Bruce, OF – 2005
- Brett Jensen, P – 2005
- Andrew Brown, UTL – 2006
- Johnny Dorn, P – 2006
- Jeff Tezak, DH – 2007
- Tony Watson, P – 2007
- Thad Weber, P – 2008
- DJ Belfonte, OF – 2010
- Casey Hauptman, P – 2011
- Josh Scheffert, 3B – 2012
- Michael Pritchard, DH – 2013
- Christian DeLeon, P – 2014
- Blake Headley, 1B – 2014
- Ryan Boldt, OF – 2015, 2016
- Tanner Lubach, C – 2015
- Chance Sinclair, P – 2015
- Chad Luensmann, P – 2016
- Steven Reveles, SS – 2016
- Scott Schreiber, 1B – 2018
- Jesse Wilkening, C – 2018
- Cam Chick, DH – 2019
- Aaron Palensky, OF – 2019
- Max Anderson, 3B – 2021
- Emmett Olson, SP – 2022
- Gabe Swansen, OF – 2023
- Mason McConnaughey, SP – 2024
- Tyler Stone, DH – 2024

=== Third-team ===
- Richard Stock, 1B – 2012
- Pat Kelly, 2B – 2012
- Kyle Kubat, P – 2012
- Blake Headley, 3B – 2013
- Kash Kalkowski, 1B – 2013
- Rich Sanguinetti, OF – 2013
- Zach Hirsch, P – 2014
- Josh Roeder, P – 2015
- Jake Meyers, OF – 2016
- Ben Miller, DH – 2016
- Angelo Altavilla, SS – 2017
- Jake Hohensee, P – 2017
- Shay Schanaman, RP – 2023
- Case Sanderson, OF – 2024

== Retired jerseys ==
No.	Player	Position	Tenure	Retired (Note: The year the player's jersey was retired by the university.)
4	Alex Gordon	3B	2003–2005	2023
17	Darin Erstad	OF	1993–1995	2023
28	Shane Komine	P	1999–2002	2023

== See also ==
- College baseball awards
- Nebraska Cornhuskers academic honors and awards
