= Vernon Fewell =

American football coach (1940–2015)

Biographical details
- Born: June 9, 1940; San Antonio, Texas, U.S.
- Died: September 26, 2015 (aged 75); Waco, Texas, U.S.

Playing career
- 1959–1962: Texas Lutheran
- Position: Quarterback

Coaching career (HC unless noted)
- 1969: Sweeny HS (TX) (backfield)
- 1976: East Bernard HS (TX)
- 1977: Sul Ross (assistant)
- 1978: Sul Ross
- 1979: Lexington HS (TX)
- 1980: Westfield HS (TX)
- 1981–1987: Texas Lutheran

Head coaching record
- Overall: 31–44–1 (college football)

Vernon Doyle Fewell (June 9, 1940 – September 26, 2015) was an American football and track coach. He served as the head football coach at Sul Ross State University in Alpine, Texas, in 1978 and Texas Lutheran University in Seguin, Texas, from 1981 to 1987, compiling a career college football coaching record of 31–44–1.

Fewell graduated from Texas Lutheran, where he lettered in football, basketball, and track. He earned a Master of Education degree from Southwest Texas State College—now known as Texas State University—in 1968. Fewell was hired at Sul Ross in 1977 as head track coach and assistant football coach under Paul Pierce. He succeeded Pierce as head football coach after the 1977 season.

== Head coaching record ==
=== College football ===
Year	Team	Overall	Conference	Standing	Bowl/playoffs
Sul Ross Lobos (Texas Intercollegiate Athletic Association) (1978)
1978	Sul Ross	2–7	2–6	5th	
Sul Ross:		2–7	2–6		
Texas Lutheran Bulldogs (NAIA Division II independent) (1981–1986)
1981	Texas Lutheran	4–6			
1982	Texas Lutheran	4–5			
1983	Texas Lutheran	7–3			
1984	Texas Lutheran	5–3–1			
1985	Texas Lutheran	6–3			
1986	Texas Lutheran	1–9			
1987	Texas Lutheran	2–8			
Texas Lutheran:		29–37–1			
Total:		31–44–1			
