= Nebraska Cornhuskers academic honors and awards =

This list of Nebraska Cornhuskers academic honors and awards are the academic achievements of student-athletes from the University of Nebraska–Lincoln. The university represents the Big Ten Conference in NCAA Division I, fielding twenty-four varsity teams (ten men's, fourteen women's) across fifteen sports. Nebraska student-athletes have earned 175 first-team and 365 overall Academic All-America awards; seventeen of these have also been named Academic All-American of the Year. Nebraska's eighteen Today's Top 10 Awards are the most of any university.

== National awards ==
- William V. Campbell Trophy: (Note: The William V. Campbell Trophy, formerly the Draddy Trophy, was established by the National Football Foundation in 1990 to honor the college football player deemed "best in the country for his academic success, football performance and exemplary leadership.") Rob Zatechka (1994), Kyle Vanden Bosch (2000)
- Broderick Cup: (Note: The Broderick Cup was created in 1976 to honor a female student-athlete who demonstrates "not only athletic achievement but also the ideals of team contribution, scholastic endeavor, school and community involvement.) Sarah Pavan (2006–07)
- NCAA Woman of the Year Award: (Note: The NCAA Woman of the Year Award was established in 1991 and is presented annually to a graduating female student-athlete for "outstanding academic achievements, athletic excellence, community service and leadership.") Billie Winsett-Fletcher (1996), Angela Mercurio (2019)
- CSC Academic Hall of Fame: Dave Rimington (inducted 2004), Karen Jennings (inducted 2008), Pat Tyrance (inducted 2009)

== Today's Top 10 Award ==
The NCAA Honors Committee annually honors one graduating student-athlete per varsity sport with the Today's Top 10 Award for "exceptional athletic and academic achievements, as well as their contributions to their campuses and communities." Nebraska student-athletes have won eighteen Today's Top 10 Awards, more than any other school.

- Football: Randy Schleusener (1981), Dave Rimington (1983), Mark Traynowicz (1985), Jake Young (1990), Pat Tyrance (1991), Trev Alberts (1994), Rob Zatechka (1995), Aaron Graham (1996), Grant Wistrom (1998)
- Men's gymnastics: Tom Schlesinger (1989), Patrick Kirksey (1991), Anton Stephenson (2019)
- Women's gymnastics: Richelle Simpson (2006)
- Women's tennis: Mary Weatherholt (2013)
- Volleyball: Virginia Stahr (1990), Janet Kruse (1992), Nancy Metcalf (2002), Sarah Pavan (2008)

== Academic All-Americans ==
=== Academic All-American of the Year ===
CSC annually selects an academic All-American of the Year from each NCAA-sponsored sport. Twelve Nebraska athletes have combined to earn seventeen awards. CSC also names a student-athlete as the NCAA Division I academic All-American of the year across all sports – three Cornhuskers have been selected, Rob Zatechka in 1994 and Sarah Pavan in 2006 and 2007. Pavan is one of two NCAA Division I student-athletes to win the award twice.

- Lori Sippel – 1988
- Virginia Stahr – 1988, 1989
- Janet Kruse – 1990, 1991
- Karen Jennings – 1992, 1993
- Rob Zatechka – 1994
- Nicola Martial – 1996
- Joy Taylor – 1996
- Janet Blomstedt – 1997
- Jeff Leise – 2002, 2003
- Sarah Pavan – 2006, 2007
- John Welk – 2015
- Drew Wiseman – 2017

=== First-team academic All-Americans ===
Nebraska student-athletes have earned 365 total Academic All-America selections across all sports, second to Stanford among NCAA Division I universities, including 175 first-team honors. Potential academic All-America selections must be in at least their second year of school, maintain a 3.5 cumulative grade-point average, regularly feature in his or her team's athletic competitions, and be active in the community. Nebraska's football program has produced 108 academic All-Americans, most among FBS schools.

Football

- Bob Oberlin – 1952, 1953
- Jim Huge – 1962
- Dennis Claridge – 1963
- Marv Mueller – 1966
- Randy Reeves – 1969
- Larry Jacobson – 1971
- Jeff Kinney – 1971
- Frosty Anderson – 1973
- Rik Bonness – 1975
- Tom Heiser – 1975
- Vince Ferragamo – 1976
- Ted Harvey – 1977
- George Andrews – 1978
- Jim Pillen – 1978
- Rod Horn – 1979
- Kelly Saalfeld – 1979
- Randy Schleusener – 1979, 1980
- Jeff Finn – 1980
- Ric Lindquist – 1980, 1981
- Dave Rimington – 1981, 1982
- Randy Theiss – 1981
- Scott Strasbuger – 1983, 1984
- Rob Stuckey – 1983, 1984
- Mark Traynowicz – 1984
- Dale Klein – 1986
- Tom Welter – 1986
- Mark Blazek – 1987, 1988
- Jeff Jamrog – 1987
- John Kroeker – 1988
- Gerry Gdowski – 1989
- Pat Tyrance – 1989, 1990
- Jake Young – 1989
- David Edeal – 1990
- Pat Engelbert – 1990, 1991
- Jim Wanek – 1990
- Mike Stigge – 1991, 1992
- Trev Alberts – 1993
- Terry Connealy – 1993, 1994
- Rob Zatechka – 1993, 1994
- Matt Shaw – 1994
- Aaron Graham – 1995
- Grant Wistrom – 1996, 1997
- Joel Makovicka – 1997, 1998
- Chad Kelsay – 1998
- Bill Lafleur – 1998
- Mike Brown – 1999
- Kyle Vanden Bosch – 1999, 2000
- Tracey Wistrom – 2001
- Chad Sievers – 2004
- Kurt Mann – 2005
- Dane Todd – 2005
- Austin Cassidy – 2010, 2011
- Rex Burkhead – 2011, 2012
- Spencer Long – 2013
- Chris Weber – 2017

Baseball

- Erik Mumm – 1999
- John Cole – 2001
- Jeff Leise – 2002, 2003
- Aaron Marsden – 2003
- Brandon Buckman – 2006
- D.J. Belfonte – 2010

Men's basketball

- Shavon Shields – 2015

Women's basketball

- Stephanie Bolli – 1988
- Karen Jennings – 1991, 1992, 1993

Men's gymnastics

- Tom Schlesinger – 1988
- Mark Warburton – 1990
- Sumner Darling – 1993, 1994
- Rick Kieffer – 1995
- Stephen Tetrault – 2008
- Anton Stephenson – 2019

Women's gymnastics

- Nicole Duval – 1995
- Kim DeHaan – 1996
- Joy Taylor – 1996
- Libby Landgraf – 2004
- Emily Wong – 2014
- Danielle Breen – 2018

Rifle

- Rachel Spiry – 2002

Soccer

- Caroline Flynn – 2016
- Eleanor Dale – 2023

Softball

- Denise Eckert – 1984, 1985
- Lori Richins – 1986
- Lori Sippel – 1988
- Jill Rishel – 1990
- Lizzy Aumua – 2006
- Molly Hill – 2009
- Mattie Fowler – 2016

Men's swimming and diving

- Justin Switzer – 1993, 1994
- Michael Windisch – 2000

Women's swimming and diving

- Courtney Jensen – 2000
- Abigail Knapton – 2021

Men's tennis

- Steven Jung – 1989
- Linus Erhart – 2018

Women's tennis

- Imke Reimers – 2008

Men's track & field/cross country

- Brady Bonsall – 1996
- Alex Lamme – 1996
- Nate Probasco – 2007
- Issar Yazhbin – 2007
- Nicholas Gordon – 2010
- Bjorn Barrefors – 2011, 2012, 2013
- Nate Polacek – 2012
- Levi Gipson – 2014, 2015, 2016
- John Welk – 2015
- Cody Rush – 2016
- Drew Wiseman – 2015, 2017
- Kevin Cahoy – 2020, 2021
- Luke Siedhoff – 2021
- Till Steinforth – 2023, 2024
- Tyus Wilson – 2024

Women's track & field/cross country

- Nicola Martial – 1996
- Kathy Travis Miller – 1996
- Janet Blomstedt – 1997
- Jill Myatt – 1997
- Stella Klassen – 2000
- Tia DeSoto – 2004
- Ashley Selig – 2006, 2007
- Jenny Green – 2007
- Kim Shubert – 2008
- Natalie Willer – 2011
- Anne Martin – 2014
- Axelina Johansson – 2024

Volleyball

- Karen Dahlgren – 1985, 1986
- Virginia Stahr – 1987, 1988, 1989
- Janet Kruse – 1990, 1991
- Allison Weston – 1995
- Nancy Metcalf – 2001
- Amber Holmquist – 2002
- Laura Pilakowski – 2002
- Christina Houghtelling – 2005, 2007
- Sarah Pavan – 2005, 2006, 2007
- Kori Cooper – 2008, 2009
- Amanda Gates – 2008
- Tracy Stalls – 2008
- Gina Mancuso – 2012
- Kadie Rolfzen – 2016
- Lexi Rodriguez – 2023

Wrestling

- Ryan Tobin – 1998
- Tucker Lane – 2012
- Josh Ihnen – 2013
