= Horse-collar tackle =

Illegal tackle in American football

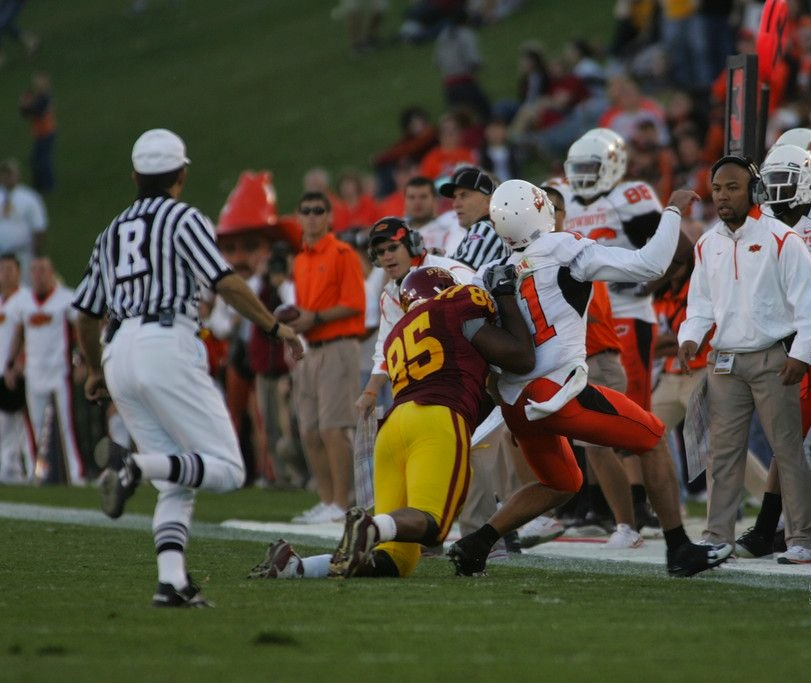
Example of a horse-collar tackle made by an ISU player (red and gold) on a player. The tackler's right hand has grabbed the Cowboy runner's collar and is using it to pull him down from behind.

The horse-collar tackle is a gridiron football maneuver in which a defender tackles another player by grabbing the back collar or the back-inside of an opponent's shoulder pads and pulling the ball carrier directly downward violently in order to pull his feet from underneath him. The technique is most closely associated with Pro Bowl safety Roy Williams.

After being blamed for a series of major injuries in the 2004 season, the horse-collar tackle was banned from the NFL during the 2005 off-season. The rule forbidding it is often referred to in the press as "The Roy Williams Rule". The rule, with modifications, was adopted in college football in 2008 and high school football in 2009.

== History ==
In the 1981 NFC Championship Game where the Dallas Cowboys visited the San Francisco 49ers, after the 49ers took the lead 28–27 due to "The Catch", on the Cowboys following drive, Drew Pearson caught a long pass from Danny White at midfield. 49ers cornerback Eric Wright stopped Pearson with a horse-collar tackle (Danny White fumbled on the next play, thus preserving victory for the 49ers and putting them in Super Bowl XVI).

Roy Williams was well known for horse-collaring players while playing at Oklahoma, and continued to use the tackle after moving to the NFL in 2002.

The horse-collar tackle rose to infamy during the 2004 NFL season, in which it was implicated in six major injuries, four of which were caused by Williams, including two in one game. The injuries that season included broken legs for Philadelphia Eagles wide receiver Terrell Owens, Carolina Panthers wide receiver Steve Smith Sr., Baltimore Ravens running back Musa Smith, and Tennessee Titans wide out Tyrone Calico. On May 23, 2005, NFL owners voted 27–5 to ban the tackle, with the Dallas Cowboys, Detroit Lions, New England Patriots, New Orleans Saints, and San Francisco 49ers voting against. The first year of the ban, only two penalties were called by referees for the horse-collar tackle. Owners voted 25–7 in 2006 to expand the rule to include tackles by the back of the jersey in addition to tackles by the shoulder pads.

== Risks ==
The horse-collar is particularly dangerous due to the awkward position of the player being tackled, who will often fall backward in a twisting motion with one or both legs trapped under the weight of his body. This is exacerbated if the player's foot gets caught in the turf and by the additional weight of the defender. Potential injuries include sprains or tears to ligaments in the knees and ankles (including the ACL and MCL), and fractures of the tibia and fibula. Musa Smith, for instance, was effectively sidelined for two seasons after a horse-collar tackle by Williams broke his right tibia.

In the NFL, the ban states that a horse-collar tackle is an open-field tackle in which a defender uses the shoulder pads or jersey to immediately bring a ball carrier down. The term "open field" means that horse-collar tackles committed near the line of scrimmage will be allowed.

In the NCAA, beginning in 2024, there is no “open field” requirement. Therefore, the college horse-collar rule “applies to a ball carrier, including a potential passer, who is inside the tackle box.” NCAA Football Rule 9-1-15.

== Punishment ==
In the NFL, the horse-collar tackle results in a 15-yard personal foul penalty and an automatic first down. The penalty is assessed as if it were a dead ball foul if the opposing offense gains yards. It will often also result in a league-imposed fine on the player. Roy Williams was the first player suspended for repeated violations of the rule. The one-game suspension was given following a horse-collar tackle on Philadelphia Eagles quarterback Donovan McNabb that occurred on December 16, 2007, and it was Williams' third violation of the rule of the 2007 season.

The tackle was made illegal in the CFL and the NFL in 2005 and for the 2007 season for CFL. The horse collar tackle was legal through the 2007–2008 season in college football but was banned by the NCAA after criticism from pundits and coaches for the 2008–2009 season as part of a package that adopted several NFL rules into the college game.

The National Federation of State High School Associations added a penalty for horse-collar tackles for the 2009 season. It was outlawed a year earlier in Massachusetts, which played by NCAA rules until 2018, and Texas, which still uses the NCAA rule book with modifications approved by the University Interscholastic League.
