= Derrie Nelson =

American football player (born 1958)

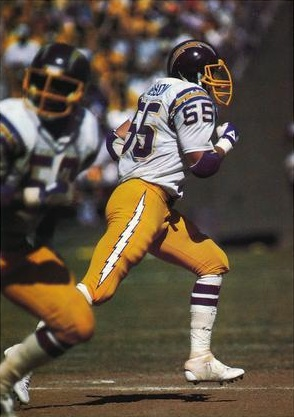
- Nelson c. 1984

No. 55
- Position: Linebacker

Personal information
- Born: February 8, 1958 (age 68); York, Nebraska, U.S.
- Listed height: 6 ft 2 in (1.88 m)
- Listed weight: 236 lb (107 kg)

Career information
- High school: Fairmont (NE)
- College: Nebraska
- NFL draft: 1981: 4th round, 108th overall pick

Career history
- Dallas Cowboys (1981)*; Cleveland Browns (1981)*; San Diego Chargers (1982–1986)
- * Offseason or practice squad member only

Awards and highlights
- First-team All-American (1980); Big Eight Defensive Player of the Year (1980); 2× First-team All-Big Eight (1979, 1980)

Career NFL statistics
- Games played: 48
- Games started: 1
- Fumble recoveries: 1
- Stats at Pro Football Reference

Derald Lawrence Nelson (born February 8, 1958) is an American former professional football player who was a linebacker for the San Diego Chargers of the National Football League (NFL). He played college football for the Nebraska Cornhuskers.

== Early life ==
Nelson attended Fairmont Public School where he received All-State honors in football. He also lettered in baseball as a pitcher.

He walked on at the University of Nebraska–Lincoln. He became a starter for the Cornhuskers at the stand-up defensive end position as a sophomore, registering 42 tackles (20 solo), 3 fumble recoveries, one interception and one blocked punt. The next year, he recorded 58 tackles (34 solo), 2 fumble recoveries and 2 passes defensed.

As a senior, he was the captain of a defense that gave up an average of only 9.1 points per game. He finished with 57 tackles (42 solo), 2 fumble recoveries and one pass defensed.

In 1998, he was inducted into the Nebraska Football Hall of Fame.

== Professional career ==
=== Dallas Cowboys ===
Nelson was selected by the Dallas Cowboys in the fourth round (108th overall) of the 1981 NFL draft, with the intention of playing him at linebacker. He was waived on August 3.

=== Cleveland Browns ===
On August 21, 1981, he signed with the Cleveland Browns as a free agent. He was released before the start of the season.

=== San Diego Chargers ===
In 1982, he signed as a free agent with the San Diego Chargers, but suffered an injury during preseason and was placed on the injured reserve list on August 30. The next year, he became a special teams standout. He was voted Chargers special teams player of the year by his teammates in 1983 and 1985.

On August 20, 1984, he was placed on the injured reserve list. He was activated on November 9 and was able to play in six games. Nelson was released on August 29, 1987.

== Personal life ==
His uncle Bob Cerv was a Major League Baseball All-Star with the Kansas City Athletics and the New York Yankees.
