= Jarvis Redwine =

American football player (born 1957)

No. 12, 22
- Position: Running back

Personal information
- Born: May 16, 1957 (age 69); Los Angeles, California, U.S.
- Listed height: 5 ft 10 in (1.78 m)
- Listed weight: 198 lb (90 kg)

Career information
- High school: Inglewood (Inglewood, California)
- College: Oregon State; Nebraska
- NFL draft: 1981: 2nd round, 52nd overall pick

Career history
- Minnesota Vikings (1981–1983)

Awards and highlights
- Consensus All-American (1980); 2× First-team All-Big Eight (1979, 1980)

Career NFL statistics
- Rushing yards: 70
- Rushing average: 4.1
- Receptions: 1
- Receiving yards: 4
- Stats at Pro Football Reference

Jarvis John Redwine (born May 16, 1957) is an American former professional football player who was a running back for three seasons in the National Football League (NFL) during the 1980s. Redwine played college football for the Nebraska Cornhuskers, and earned first-team All-American honors in 1980. He was selected in the second round of the 1981 NFL draft, and played professionally for the NFL's Minnesota Vikings 1981 to 1983.

Born in Los Angeles, Redwine played high school football at Inglewood High School. He played college football for the Oregon State in 1976 and 1977, then transferred to the University of Nebraska–Lincoln, where he played for head coach Tom Osborne. His first Cornhusker season's performance as a junior in 1979 earned him Osborne's endorsement as Nebraska's best chance at a Heisman Trophy winner since Johnny Rodgers in 1972. Redwine suffered a broken rib midway through his senior season in 1980 and fell back in the Heisman race, in which he finished seventh. Even so, he was the first Cornhusker to rush for 1,000 yards in consecutive seasons, gaining 1,119.
