= Johnnie Poe =

American football player (born 1959)

No. 25
- Position: Cornerback

Personal information
- Born: August 29, 1959 (age 67); St. Louis, Missouri, U.S.
- Listed height: 6 ft 1 in (1.85 m)
- Listed weight: 190 lb (86 kg)

Career information
- High school: Lincoln (East St. Louis, Illinois)
- College: Missouri
- NFL draft: 1981: 6th round, 144th overall pick

Career history
- New Orleans Saints (1981–1987); San Francisco 49ers (1988)*
- * Offseason or practice squad member only

Awards and highlights
- Second-team All-Big Eight (1980)

Career NFL statistics
- Interceptions: 17
- Fumble recoveries: 6
- Total touchdowns: 3
- Stats at Pro Football Reference

Johnnie Edward Poe (born August 29, 1959) is an American former professional football player who was a cornerback who spent his entire seven-year career with the New Orleans Saints of the National Football League (NFL). Poe played college football for the Missouri Tigers, before being selected 144th overall by the Saints in the sixth round of the 1981 NFL draft.

Poe played a total of 100 games over his seven-year career, amasseing 17 interceptions, 73 yards from 9 punt returns, and 2 touchdowns. 1983 was arguably Poe's best year, as he intercepted 7 passes and returned one for a touchdown.
