= Louis Oubre =

American football player (born 1958)

Louis B. Oubre III
No. 66, 68
- Position: Guard

Personal information
- Born: May 15, 1958 (age 68); New Orleans, Louisiana, U.S.
- Listed height: 6 ft 4 in (1.93 m)
- Listed weight: 262 lb (119 kg)

Career information
- High school: St. Augustine (New Orleans)
- College: Oklahoma
- NFL draft: 1981: 5th round, 112th overall pick

Career history
- New Orleans Saints (1982–1984); Philadelphia Eagles (1986); Miami Dolphins (1987)

Awards and highlights
- Consensus All-American (1980); 2× First-team All-Big Eight (1979, 1980)

Career NFL statistics
- Games played: 40
- Games started: 31
- Fumble recoveries: 1
- Stats at Pro Football Reference

Louis Byron Oubre, III (born May 15, 1958) is an American former professional football player who was a guard in the National Football League (NFL) for five seasons during the 1980s. He played college football for the Oklahoma Sooners and earned All-American honors. He played professionally for the NFL's New Orleans Saints, the Philadelphia Eagles and later the Miami Dolphins.

He was born in New Orleans, Louisiana, where he played at St. Augustine High School. He was a member of the Purple Knights' 1975 Class AAAA state championship team.

Louis B. Oubre, III attended the University of Oklahoma, coached by College Football Hall of Fame Coach Barry Switzer where he played for the Sooners from 1977 to 1980. He was a stalwart on the offensive line that ran the vaunted Wishbone Offense. He blocked for the Heisman Trophy winner Billy Simms. As a senior in 1980, he was recognized as a consensus first-team All-American.

The New Orleans Saints chose Oubre in the fifth round (112th pick overall) of the 1981 NFL draft, where he was coached by the late Bum Phillips from 1981 to 1984. He was also a member of the Philadelphia Eagles coached by the late Buddy Ryan as a member of the practice squad in 1986. He last played for the Miami Dolphins where he was coached by the late NFL Hall of Fame Coach Don Shula which was his final NFL season in 1987.

He later served as the head coach at Bessie Coleman Middle school and offensive line coach on Cedar Hill High School Football team from 2009-2017 winning two state championships in 2015 and 2016. He retired from coaching in 2018. He is also featured in several books, What It Means to Be a Sooner by Jeff Snook and The Bootlegger's Son by Barry Switzer.
