= Gregg Johnson (American football) =

American football player (born 1958)

No. 27
- Position: Defensive back

Personal information
- Born: October 20, 1958 (age 68); Houston, Texas, U.S.
- Listed height: 6 ft 1 in (1.85 m)
- Listed weight: 191 lb (87 kg)

Career information
- High school: Sterling Aviation (Houston)
- College: Oklahoma State
- NFL draft: 1981: undrafted

Career history
- Seattle Seahawks (1981–1983); New Jersey Generals (1984-1985); Seattle Seahawks (1986); St. Louis Cardinals (1987)

Awards and highlights
- 3× Second-team All-Big Eight (1978, 1979, 1980)

Career NFL statistics
- Fumble recoveries: 8
- Sacks: 1
- Touchdowns: 1
- Stats at Pro Football Reference

Greggory Da-marr Johnson (born October 20, 1958) is an American former professional football player who was a defensive back for the Seattle Seahawks and the St. Louis Cardinals of the National Football League (NFL). He played college football for the Oklahoma State Cowboys.
