= Earl Cooper (American football) =

American football player (born 1957)

No. 49, 89, 86
- Positions: Fullback, tight end

Personal information
- Born: September 17, 1957 (age 69); Lexington, Texas, U.S.
- Listed height: 6 ft 2 in (1.88 m)
- Listed weight: 227 lb (103 kg)

Career information
- High school: Lexington
- College: Rice
- NFL draft: 1980: 1st round, 13th overall pick

Career history
- San Francisco 49ers (1980–1985); Los Angeles Raiders (1986)

Awards and highlights
- 2× Super Bowl champion (XVI, XIX)

Career NFL statistics
- Rushing yards: 1,152
- Rushing average: 3.9
- Rushing touchdowns: 6
- Receptions: 213
- Receiving yards: 1,908
- Receiving touchdowns: 12
- Stats at Pro Football Reference

Marion Earl Cooper (born September 17, 1957) is an American former professional football player who was a fullback and tight end in the National Football League (NFL), primarily with the San Francisco 49ers. He played college football for the Rice Owls and was selected by the 49ers in the first round of the 1980 NFL draft with the 13th overall pick.

== Career ==
A 6'2", 227-lb. fullback-tight end from Rice University, Cooper played in 7 NFL seasons from 1980 to 1986. Cooper had a record 19 receptions over his first two career games. This record stood until 2023, when Puka Nacua had 25 receptions over his first two games. Cooper's rookie season for the 49ers in 1980, he finished second in the league in receptions with 83 (San Diego's Kellen Winslow had 89). He was a key contributor on the final 89-yard drive that led to the play that has been immortalized as "The Catch" in the 1982 NFC Playoffs versus the Dallas Cowboys.

Cooper also appeared in two Super Bowls for the 49ers, even catching an 11-yard touchdown pass from quarterback Joe Montana in Super Bowl XVI versus the Cincinnati Bengals, a catch beautifully depicted on the cover of Sports Illustrated. That game would be Cooper's last as a running back. Just before the 1982 season, Cooper was converted to a tight end. He ended his career with the Los Angeles Raiders in 1986.

== Personal life ==
Cooper graduated from high school in Lexington, Texas. He was a teacher and coach in Pflugerville, Texas, but is now retired.
