= Lexington Independent School District =

School district in Texas, United States

Address
- 8403 North Highway 77 Lexington, Texas, 78947; United States

District information
- Grades: PK–12
- Schools: 3
- NCES District ID: 4827330

Students and staff
- Students: 1,066 (2023–2024)
- Teachers: 89.48 (on an FTE basis)
- Student–teacher ratio: 11.91:1

Other information
- Website: www.lexingtonisd.net

Lexington Independent School District is a public school district based in Lexington, Texas (USA).

Located in Lee County, very small portions of the district extend into Bastrop, Milam, and Williamson counties.

In 2009, the school district was rated "academically acceptable" by the Texas Education Agency.

The current Superintendent of the Lexington Independent School District is Dr. Cliff Lightfoot.

A. P. Kleinschmidt, a former LISD superintendent, is the father of current State Representative Tim Kleinschmidt from District 17 (Lee, Bastrop, Caldwell, Gonzales, and Karnes counties). The younger Kleinschmidt is an attorney in Giddings.

== Schools ==
- Lexington High School (Grades 9–12)
- Lexington Middle School (Grades 6–8)
- Lexington Elementary School (Grades PK-5)
