= 1979 All-Big Eight Conference football team =

American all-star college football team

The 1979 All-Big Eight Conference football team consists of American football players chosen by various organizations for All-Big Eight Conference teams for the 1979 NCAA Division I-A football season. The selectors for the 1979 season included the Associated Press (AP) and United Press International (UPI).

== Offensive selections ==
=== Quarterbacks ===
- Phil Bradley, Missouri (AP-1; UPI-1)
- J. C. Watts, Oklahoma (AP-2)

=== Running backs ===
- Billy Sims, Oklahoma (AP-1; UPI-1)
- Jarvis Redwine, Nebraska (AP-1; UPI-1)
- Worley Taylor, Oklahoma State (AP-1)
- Gerry Ellis, Missouri (AP-2)
- James Wilder Sr., Missouri (AP-2)
- L. J. Brown, Kansas State (AP-2)
- Kenny Brown, Nebraska (UPI-2)

=== Tight ends ===
- Junior Miller, Nebraska (AP-1; UPI-1)
- Eddy Whitley, Kansas State (AP-2)

=== Centers ===
- Paul Tabor, Oklahoma (AP-1; UPI-1)
- Kelly Saalfeld, Nebraska (AP-2; UPI-2)

=== Offensive guards ===
- John Havekost, Nebraska (AP-1; UPI-1)
- Reggie Richardson, Oklahoma State (AP-1; UPI-1)
- Dick Cuvelier, Iowa State (AP-2)
- Randy Schleusener, Nebraska (AP-2)

=== Offensive tackles ===
- Stan Brock, Colorado (AP-1; UPI-1)
- Louis Oubre, Oklahoma (AP-1; UPI-1)
- Howard Richards, Missouri (AP-2)
- Dave Guender, Missouri (AP-2)
- Mark Goodspeed, Nebraska (UPI-2)

=== Wide receivers ===
- David Verser, Kansas (AP-1; UPI-1)
- Tim Smith, Nebraska (AP-2; UPI-1)

== Defensive selections ==
=== Defensive ends ===
- Derrie Nelson, Nebraska (AP-1; UPI-1)
- James Walker, Kansas State (AP-2; UPI-1)
- Rick Antle, Oklahoma State (AP-1)
- Wendell Ray, Missouri (AP-2)

=== Defensive tackles ===
- Rod Horn, Nebraska (AP-1; UPI-1)
- John Goodman, Oklahoma (AP-1; UPI-1)
- Bill Barnett, Nebraska (AP-2; UPI-2)
- Curtis Boone, Oklahoma State (AP-2)

=== Middle guards ===
- Kerry Weinmaster, Nebraska (AP-1; UPI-1)
- Norman Goodman, Missouri (AP-2)

=== Linebackers ===
- George Cumby, Oklahoma (AP-1; UPI-1)
- Ricky Young, Oklahoma State (AP-1; UPI-1)
- Bill Roe, Colorado (AP-2)
- Mike Leaders, Iowa State (AP-2)

=== Defensive backs ===
- Mark Haynes, Colorado (AP-1; UPI-1)
- Darrol Ray, Oklahoma (AP-1; UPI-1)
- Eric Wright, Missouri (AP-1; UPI-1)
- Mike Schwartz, Iowa State (UPI-1)
- LeRoy Irvin, Kansas (AP-2)
- Gregg Johnson, Oklahoma State (AP-2)
- Basil Banks, Oklahoma (AP-2)

== Special teams ==
=== Place-kicker ===
- Dean Sukup, Nebraska (AP-1; UPI-1)
- Colin Ankerson, Oklahoma State (AP-2)

=== Punter ===
- Mike Hubach, Kansas (AP-1; UPI-1)

== Key ==
AP = Associated Press

UPI = United Press International

== See also ==
- 1979 College Football All-America Team
