= David Verser =

American football player (born 1958)

No. 81, 84, 85
- Position: Wide receiver

Personal information
- Born: March 1, 1958 (age 68); Kansas City, Kansas, U.S.
- Listed height: 6 ft 1 in (1.85 m)
- Listed weight: 200 lb (91 kg)

Career information
- High school: Sumner (Kansas City, Kansas)
- College: Kansas
- NFL draft: 1981: 1st round, 10th overall pick

Career history
- Cincinnati Bengals (1981–1984); Tampa Bay Buccaneers (1985); Green Bay Packers (1987)*; Cleveland Browns (1987)
- * Offseason or practice squad member only

Awards and highlights
- Second-team All-American (1980); 2× First-team All-Big Eight (1979, 1980)

Career NFL statistics
- Receptions: 23
- Receiving yards: 454
- Receiving touchdowns: 3
- Stats at Pro Football Reference

David Verser (born March 1, 1958) is an American former professional football player who was a wide receiver in the National Football League (NFL).

== Career ==
Verser played football at the University of Kansas, where, during his senior year, he led the Jayhawks in receiving with 21 receptions for 463 yards and five touchdowns. He earned a degree in social work.

Verser was selected in the first round by the Cincinnati Bengals in the 1981 NFL draft. He had 23 receptions in four seasons as a backup receiver. In 1981, he caught six passes for 161 yards (26.8 yards per catch) and scored two touchdowns, and returned 29 kicks for 691 yards, a 23.8 average. In the 1981 AFC championship game, known as the Freezer Bowl, he had a 40-yard kickoff return that set up a Bengals touchdown. He played in Super Bowl XVI, which the Bengals lost to the San Francisco 49ers, 26-21, but had a poor performance, returning five kickoffs for just 52 yards. He also missed a blocking audible that contributed to a failed 4th and goal conversion attempt from the 49ers 1-yard line.

During the 1982 through 1984 seasons, Verser was a backup wide receiver and kick returner for the Bengals.

After the 1985 NFL draft, he was traded to the Green Bay Packers and later signed with the Tampa Bay Buccaneers, for whom he played one game and returned four kicks in 1985. He was out of football in 1986, and in 1987 played two games for the Cleveland Browns, with one rush for nine yards. He finished his NFL career with 65 kickoff returns for 1,371 yards, and 23 receptions for 451 yards and three touchdowns. He also had eight carries for 51 yards.

After leaving football and with a degree in social work, he became a social worker, worked for the Hamilton County, Ohio Juvenile Court, then he became a police officer with the Cincinnati Police Department. He retired from the department after 12 years.
