= 1980 All-Big Eight Conference football team =

American all-star college football team

The 1980 All-Big Eight Conference football team consists of American football players chosen by various organizations for All-Big Eight Conference teams for the 1980 NCAA Division I-A football season. The selectors for the 1980 season included the Associated Press (AP) and United Press International (UPI).

== Offensive selections ==
=== Quarterbacks ===
- Phil Bradley, Missouri (AP-1; UPI-1)
- J. C. Watts, Oklahoma (AP-2; UPI-2)
- Jeff Quinn, Nebraska (UPI-2)

=== Running backs ===
- Jarvis Redwine, Nebraska (AP-1; UPI-1)
- Kerwin Bell, Kansas (AP-1; UPI-1)
- Dwayne Crutchfield, Iowa State (AP-1; UPI-1)
- Andra Franklin, Nebraska (AP-2; UPI-2)
- David Overstreet, Oklahoma (AP-2)
- James Wilder Sr., Missouri (AP-2)

=== Tight ends ===
- Forrest Valora, Oklahoma (AP-1; UPI-1)
- Andy Gibler, Missouri (AP-2; UPI-2)

=== Wide receivers ===
- David Verser, Kansas (AP-1; UPI-1)
- Mel Campbell, Oklahoma State (AP-2; UPI-2)
- Ron Fellows, Missouri (UPI-2)

=== Centers ===
- Brad Edelman, Missouri (AP-1; UPI-1)
- Dave Rimington, Nebraska (AP-2; UPI-2)

=== Offensive guards ===
- Randy Schleusener, Nebraska (AP-1; UPI-1)
- Terry Crouch, Oklahoma (AP-1; UPI-1)
- Don Key, Oklahoma (AP-2; UPI-2)
- Stan Lechner, Missouri (AP-2)
- Joe Adams, Nebraska (UPI-2)

=== Offensive tackles ===
- Howard Richards, Missouri (AP-1; UPI-1)
- Louis Oubre, Oklahoma (AP-1; UPI-1)
- Dan Hurley, Nebraska (AP-2; UPI-2)
- Bob Ed Culver Jr., Oklahoma (AP-2)
- Karl Nelson, Iowa State (UPI-2)

== Defensive selections ==
=== Defensive ends ===
- Derrie Nelson, Nebraska (AP-1; UPI-1)
- James Walker, Kansas State (AP-1; UPI-1)
- Wendell Ray, Missouri (AP-2; UPI-2)
- Jimmy Williams, Nebraska (AP-2; UPI-2)

=== Defensive tackles ===
- Richard Turner, Oklahoma (AP-1; UPI-1)
- David Clark, Nebraska (AP-1; UPI-2)
- Dean Prater, Oklahoma State (UPI-1)
- Keith Gary, Oklahoma (AP-2; UPI-2)
- Jeff Fox, Kansas (AP-2)

=== Nose guards ===
- Stan Gardner, Kansas (AP-1; UPI-1)
- Curt Hineline, Nebraska (AP-2)
- Johnnie Lewis, Oklahoma (UPI-2)

=== Linebackers ===
- Ricky Young, Oklahoma State (AP-1; UPI-1)
- Lester Dickey, Missouri (AP-1; UPI-2)
- Steve Doolittle, Colorado (AP-2; UPI-1)
- Mike Green, Oklahoma State (AP-2; UPI-2)

=== Defensive backs ===
- Eric Wright, Missouri (AP-1; UPI-2)
- Russell Gary, Nebraska (AP-1; UPI-1)
- Larry Crawford, Iowa State (AP-1; UPI-1)
- Bill Whitaker, Missouri (AP-1; UPI-1)
- Joe Tumpich, Kansas (AP-2; UPI-1)
- Johnnie Poe, Missouri (AP-2; UPI-2)
- Jay Jimerson, Oklahoma State (AP-2)
- Gregg Johnson, Oklahoma State (AP-2; UPI-2)
- Jim Bob Morris, Kansas State (UPI-2)

== Special teams ==
=== Place-kicker ===
- Ron Verrilli, Missouri (AP-1; UPI-2)
- Alex Giffords, Iowa State (AP-2; UPI-1)

=== Punter ===
- Bucky Scribner, Kansas (AP-1; UPI-1)
- Art Woods, Colorado (AP-2)
- Don Birdsey, Kansas State (UPI-2)

== Key ==
AP = Associated Press

UPI = United Press International

== See also ==
- 1980 College Football All-America Team
