= Lexington High School (Texas) =

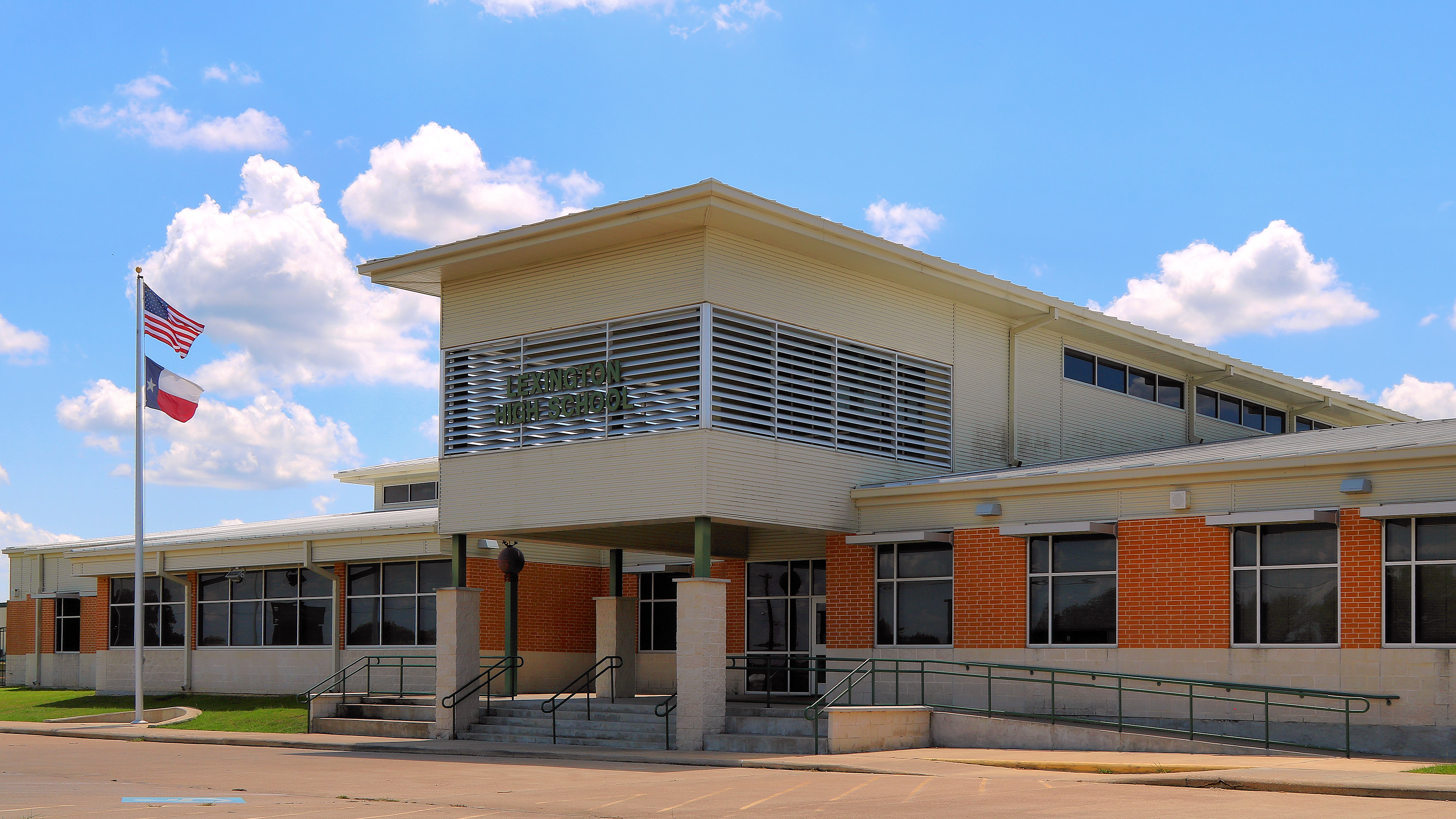

Location
- 8783 North Highway 77; Lexington, Texas 78947; United States; 30.413305°N 97.003810°W

Information
- School type: Public high school
- School district: Lexington Independent School District
- Principal: Sarah Garrison
- Staff: 34.23 (FTE)
- Grades: 9-12
- Enrollment: 301 (2025–2026)
- Student to teacher ratio: 10.34
- Colors: Green & gold
- Athletics conference: UIL Class 3A
- Mascot: Eagle
- Yearbook: Eagle

Lexington High School is a public high school located in the city of Lexington, Texas, United States. It is classified as a 3A school by the UIL. It is a part of the Lexington Independent School District located in northwest Lee County. In 2015, the school was rated "Met Standard" by the Texas Education Agency.

== Athletics & Academics ==
The Lexington Eagles compete in these sports:

- Baseball
- Basketball
- Cross country
- Football
- Golf
- Softball
- Tennis
- Track and field
- Volleyball

=== State titles ===
Doak Springs Lincoln (PVIL)

- Girls' track
  - 1961 (B)

Lexington High School

- One Act Play
  - 2024/2025 - s/f THE HAYSTACK by Al Blyth

== Notable alumni ==
- Tim Kleinschmidt (Class of 1975), member of the Texas House of Representatives since 2009 from Lee, Bastrop, Caldwell, Gonzales, and Karnes counties
- Earl Cooper (Class of 1976), NFL player, San Francisco 49ers (1980–1985) and Los Angeles Raiders (1986)
- Jordan Peterson (Class of 2005), American football coach
