= John Goodman (American football) =

American football player (born 1958)

No. 95
- Positions: Defensive end, defensive tackle

Personal information
- Born: November 21, 1958 (age 67); Oklahoma City, Oklahoma, U.S
- Listed height: 6 ft 6 in (1.98 m)
- Listed weight: 253 lb (115 kg)

Career information
- High school: Berkner (Richardson, Texas)
- College: Oklahoma
- NFL draft: 1980: 2nd round, 56th overall pick

Career history
- Pittsburgh Steelers (1980–1985)

Awards and highlights
- First-team All-Big Eight (1979)

Career NFL statistics
- Sacks: 10
- Stats at Pro Football Reference

John Richard Goodman (born November 21, 1958) is an American former professional football player who was a defensive end in the National Football League (NFL). Goodman played college football for the Oklahoma Sooners under head coach Barry Switzer, and was selected by the Pittsburgh Steelers in the second round of the 1980 NFL draft.

== Personal life ==
He currently resides in Edmond, Oklahoma. Goodman's daughter, Chelsea Goodman, attended Oklahoma as a high jumper. She was married and has two children with Philadelphia Eagles' offensive tackle Lane Johnson.
