= The Catch (American football) =

Iconic game-winning touchdown in 1981 NFL playoffs

1981 NFC Championship Game
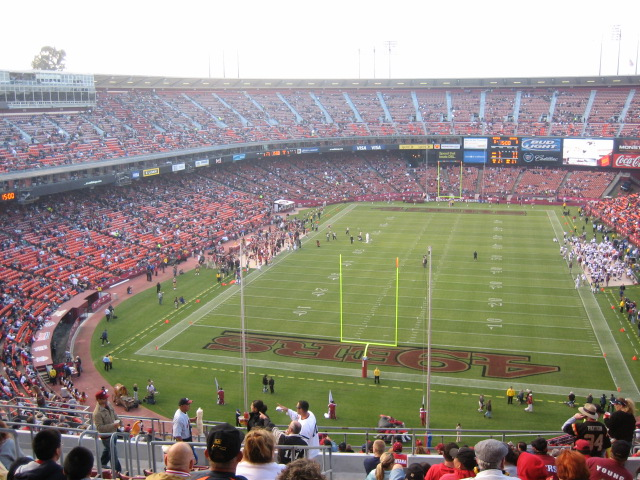
- Candlestick Park in San Francisco, California, the site of the game, seen in 2006.
Dallas Cowboys (2) (12–4)	San Francisco 49ers (1) (13–3)
27	28
Head coach: Tom Landry	Head coach: Bill Walsh
	1	2	3	4	Total
DAL	10	7	0	10	27
SF	7	7	7	7	28
- Date: January 10, 1982
- Stadium: Candlestick Park; San Francisco, California
- Referee: Jim Tunney

TV in the United States
- Network: CBS
- Announcers: Vin Scully and Hank Stram

The Catch was the game-winning touchdown reception in the 1981 NFC Championship Game played between the Dallas Cowboys and the eventual Super Bowl XVI champion San Francisco 49ers at Candlestick Park on January 10, 1982, as part of the 1981–82 NFL playoffs. With 58 seconds left in the game, the 49ers faced 3rd down and 3 yards to gain on the Cowboys' 6-yard line. 49ers wide receiver Dwight Clark made a leaping grab in the back of the end zone to complete a 6-yard touchdown pass from quarterback Joe Montana, enabling the 49ers to defeat the Cowboys, 28–27. The Catch is widely regarded as one of the greatest plays in National Football League (NFL) history. It came at the end of a 14-play, 89-yard game-winning drive engineered by Montana. The Catch symbolized the end of the Cowboys' domination in the NFC since the conference's inception in 1970 and the beginning of the 49ers' rise as an NFL dynasty in the 1980s.

== Game summary ==
=== First half ===
After the 49ers forced the Cowboys to punt on the opening drive, quarterback Joe Montana completed a 17-yard pass to Charle Young and a 24-yarder to Lenvil Elliott before throwing an 8-yard touchdown pass to wide receiver Freddie Solomon. The Cowboys responded with Danny White's 20-yard pass to Butch Johnson setting up a 44-yard field goal by Rafael Septién. Then 49ers running back Bill Ring lost a fumble on his own 29, leading to White's 26-yard touchdown pass to Tony Hill that put the Cowboys up 10–7.

In the second quarter, the 49ers reached the Cowboys' 27-yard line, only to lose the ball when Everson Walls intercepted a pass from Montana in the end zone. After forcing a Cowboys punt, Montana threw a 20-yard touchdown pass to Dwight Clark to retake the lead, 14–10. The Cowboys responded with an 80-yard drive, including a controversial pass interference penalty on 49ers defensive back Ronnie Lott which nullified his interception and gave the Cowboys a 35-yard gain to the 49ers' 12-yard line. Three plays later, running back Tony Dorsett scored a 5-yard rushing touchdown to give the Cowboys a 17–14 lead. The 49ers had another chance to score before halftime when they recovered a fumbled punt on the Cowboys' 42-yard line. After a 15-yard illegal block penalty on Clark, Montana lost a fumble while being sacked by Harvey Martin. The Cowboys fared no better as White was sacked twice on their next drive, once by Jim Stuckey and once by Lawrence Pillers, and the half ended soon after.

=== Second half ===
In the third quarter, the 49ers had another scoring opportunity when Dwight Hicks returned a punt 12 yards to midfield. The 49ers then drove to the Cowboys' 16-yard line, but once again they failed to score when Montana threw a pass that bounced out of Elliot's hands and was intercepted by Randy White. However, the Cowboys soon returned the favor with Danny White's interception to linebacker Bobby Leopold, and this time the 49ers converted, regaining the lead at 21–17 with a 2-yard touchdown run by running back Johnny Davis.

One minute into the fourth quarter, Septién kicked a 22-yard field goal that cut the scoring difference down to 1 point at 21–20. Then Walls recovered a fumble from running back Walt Easley at midfield to set up White's 21-yard touchdown pass to tight end Doug Cosbie, giving the Cowboys a 27–21 advantage. Things got even better for the Cowboys when Walls recorded his second interception from Montana on the next drive at the Cowboys' 27-yard line. The Cowboys managed to pick up a few first downs, but were forced to punt, and White's kick gave the 49ers the ball at their own 11 with 4:54 left in the game and three timeouts.

=== 49ers' final drive ===
Montana started the drive with 89 yards to reach the end zone. The drive began with an incomplete pass to Lenvil Elliot. Elliot then set up a third-and-four with a six-yard run. Montana completed a 6-yard pass to Freddie Solomon to get the first down, then handed off twice to Elliot who gained eleven and seven yards respectively, but dropped a second incomplete pass on second-and-three from their own 41-yard line. An offside penalty against the Cowboys on the next play gave Montana a fresh set of downs to work with, and Montana completed a 5-yard pass to Earl Cooper just before the 2-minute warning. Returning from the stoppage, Solomon gained 14 yards on a wide receiver reverse play to bring the ball over midfield into Cowboys territory at the 35-yard line. Montana completed two quick passes to Clark and Solomon respectively and the 49ers called a timeout with the ball on the Dallas 12. Montana launched his next pass into the end zone, but missed Solomon. On second-and-ten, Elliot ran the ball for six yards, to the Dallas six yard line, setting up a third and four for the 49ers, with a possible first down to be made at the 2-yard line and the ball spotted between the hashmarks as the team called their second timeout.

=== The play ===
Schematic of the action The Catch

The San Francisco 49ers lined up in a split backs formation, with Joe Montana under center. Wide receiver Freddie Solomon was lined up in the right slot, while Dwight Clark was outside of Solomon, wide to the right.

When Montana took the snap, the play, officially named in the 49ers playbook "Change Left Slot – Sprint Right Option", was intended to set up a quick pass to Solomon; earlier in the game, Solomon had scored a touchdown on the same play. Montana was supposed to roll to his right and find Solomon, who would run a short "square out" pattern that he would catch just past the first down marker, and either step out of bounds, giving the 49ers a fresh set of downs, or would turn upfield and score himself. Since Clark was lined up near Solomon, he was supposed to position himself to get in the way of Solomon's defender (known as a "pick" or "rub" play), and then release and head for the end zone on his own pattern, providing Montana with a second option. However, Solomon slipped while running his route, thus ruining the timing of the play, as Clark was no longer in position to impede Solomon's defender. As such, the Cowboys were able to cover Solomon perfectly. Making matters worse, the pass rush of the Cowboys collapsed the 49ers' offensive line. Three of the Cowboys' defenders, defensive ends Ed "Too Tall" Jones and Larry Bethea and linebacker D. D. Lewis, chased a backpedalling Montana toward the sideline, and seemed certain to either send him out of bounds or sack him. After his initial move, Clark's pattern called for him to cut diagonally left across the end zone, stop, and immediately reverse his path, running right along the back boundary of the end zone. Just before being chased out of bounds, and after a pump-fake caused the 6-foot 9-inch (206 cm) "Too Tall" Jones to leave his feet, Montana threw a high pass to the back of the end zone that seemed to be heading out of bounds until Clark, closely covered by Cowboys defender Everson Walls, made a leaping catch with his fingertips, and landed just in-bounds at the back right corner of the end zone to score the touchdown and tie the game with 51 seconds left. Despite the hurried and improvised look of the play on the field, it had mostly run according to plan. Because Solomon, the first option, was covered, Montana was supposed to look to Clark as his second option. Montana threw the ball to a location where only Clark could reach it; if he missed the catch it would have sailed harmlessly out of bounds. Being fairly tall himself, the 6-foot 4-inches (193 cm) Clark was able to use all of his length to jump and grab the ball with the tips of his fingers completing one of the most memorable plays in NFL history.

=== Closing out the game ===
The ensuing extra point by kicker Ray Wersching gave the 49ers a 28–27 lead. The game was not over, however, and the Cowboys quarterback Danny White had 51 seconds following a Wersching squib kick to move the ball 75 yards. On the first play from scrimmage, White hit Drew Pearson for a 31-yard reception, bringing the Cowboys over the midfield line and leaving them only 10 to 15 yards to reach field goal range. Pearson would have scored had defensive back Eric Wright not made a one-handed horse-collar tackle. After calling a timeout, White took the first down snap and was sacked by Lawrence Pillers, fumbling in the process. Jim Stuckey recovered the dropped ball, giving the 49ers offense possession near midfield, and allowing Montana to take a knee twice and run out the clock.

Clark finished the game with 8 catches for 120 yards and 2 touchdowns.

=== Reactions ===
A photograph of the catch by Walter Iooss, Jr., with Clark at the height of his leap and Everson Walls reaching out to try to block the ball, was featured on the cover of Sports Illustrated the following week.

Some people claimed that Montana was trying to throw the ball away, leaving time for a fourth down. Clark disputes that assertion, claiming that it was a backup plan that they practiced many times. Montana confirmed that he could not see the end zone through the defenders, but claims that he knew exactly where Clark would be. The 49ers coach, Bill Walsh, assumed that it was a throw-away play and immediately began planning for the fourth down until he heard the cheers from the crowd.

As for the height of the catch, Montana has said that he didn't feel that he threw the ball very high. However, Clark leaped as high as he could only to get his fingertips on the ball. In the Sports Illustrated article, Montana explained that he never saw The Catch, since he had just been knocked to the ground by Jones, but "I saw Dwight's feet touch the ground. I heard the crowd scream." Later, in the locker room, he expressed his amazement at how high Clark had jumped.

According to Clark, Jones reacted to the play by stating "You just beat America's Team" to Montana after the pass was caught, to which Montana replied, "Well, you can sit at home with the rest of America and watch the Super Bowl."

Clark, while discussing The Catch in America's Game: The Super Bowl Champions documentary about the 1981 49ers, said:

It's humbling, really. I feel honored people are still talking about it, 25 years later. I am honored to be able to be a part of a play that was kind of the culmination of just this incredible surprise season. It's great to give 49er fans that moment that they can relive over and over and over, and I know they do because when I am in San Francisco and a lot of places, people want to talk about that play and how it crushed the Cowboys and sent them into submission for a decade. I never get tired of talking about it; I never get tired of seeing it, because I sign pictures and send them to people. I see that catch every day. I may sit and think about that moment couple of times a year, and how awesome it was to be a part of that play and to be a part of the 49ers in the '80s.

== Broadcasting ==
The game was broadcast nationally in the United States by CBS. On television, Vin Scully called the play-by-play and Hank Stram did the color commentary. On radio, it was Jack Buck and Pat Summerall doing the play-by-play and color respectively. Local San Francisco radio station KCBS also provided their own broadcast, as they did for all 49ers games, with Don Klein and Wayne Walker providing the play-by-play and color respectively. Local Dallas radio station KRLD also provided their own broadcast, as they did for all Cowboys games, with Verne Lundquist and Brad Sham providing the play-by-play and color respectively. All four broadcasts featured memorable calls by the announcers. Vin Scully described the play on CBS Television:

“	Montana... looking, looking, throwing in the end zone... Clark caught it! Dwight Clark!... It's a madhouse at Candlestick!	”

Meanwhile, Jack Buck had the call over on CBS Radio:

“	Montana lines up at the five... and on third down and three he rolls right, looking to throw... looking to throw... and he throws into the end zone... Touchdown! Touchdown! Touchdown, San Francisco, by Dwight Clark!	”

Meanwhile, Don Klein called the play locally for the 49ers on KCBS:

“	Third and three. He has the ball, Montana rolling out to the right... looking toward the end zone... throwing under pressure... throws his pass... Caught by (Dwight) Clark! Clark's got a touchdown! Dwight Clark has it! It's a touchdown for the 49ers!	”

Finally, Verne Lundquist called the play locally for the Cowboys on KRLD:

“	Split backs on third down and three from the Cowboy six... 49ers trail... Montana on the roll out to the right side... pulls up... being chased... finally, fires in the end zone... Caught! Touchdown! Dwight Clark catches the ball! Nine and a half yards deep in the end zone!	”

== Aftermath ==
This game was a watershed in the historic fortunes of both the San Francisco 49ers and the Dallas Cowboys. While the 49ers had begun the 1970s winning three consecutive NFC West titles (1970–1972) and losing two NFC Championship Games (1970–1971 seasons) to the Cowboys, they had spent the remainder of the decade as a losing team. After "The Catch", the 49ers went on to win Super Bowl XVI 26–21 over the Cincinnati Bengals. The 49ers made the playoffs eight out of the next ten seasons and won three more Super Bowls in the 1980s, becoming the NFLs best dynasty of the decade. 49ers quarterback Joe Montana went on to gain a reputation for his last-minute heroics, and was elected to the Pro Football Hall of Fame in 2000, his first year of eligibility.

Meanwhile, the Cowboys, one of the most successful NFC teams in the 1970s with five Super Bowl appearances and two wins, never made it back to the Super Bowl in the 1980s. In the following season, the Cowboys reached their third straight NFC Championship Game, where they were defeated 31–17 by their archrival Washington Redskins. This ended a remarkable period that saw the Cowboys play in 10 of 13 conference championship games, while Danny White, who had become Dallas' starting quarterback in 1980, drew criticism for "not being able to win the big game," despite leading the team to successful winning seasons. The Cowboys managed to make the playoffs in the 1983 and 1985 seasons, only to be knocked out in their first game (wild-card round in 1983; divisional round in 1985), then failed to reach the postseason for the rest of the decade. In fact, beginning in 1986, the Cowboys went on to suffer losing seasons for the remainder of the eighties, leading to head coach Tom Landry being fired by new owner Jerry Jones after the 1988 season.

The 1990s, however, saw a renewal of the Cowboys-49ers rivalry fueled by "The Catch" game. The 1992–1994 seasons would see the Cowboys and 49ers face off in three straight NFC Championship games, with the Cowboys winning the first two and the 49ers winning the last one; each victorious team following it up with a Super Bowl title.

=== Legacy ===
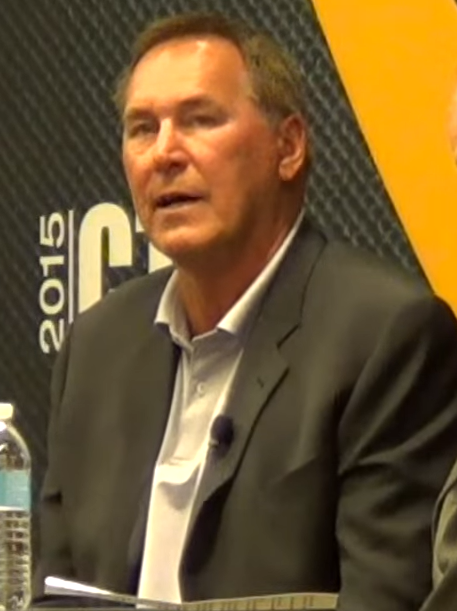
Clark in 2015

The name 'The Catch' was coined by San Francisco Chronicle sports writer Ira Miller in his reporting following the game. New England Patriots and Tampa Bay Buccaneers quarterback Tom Brady, a Bay Area native who ultimately grew up idolizing Montana on his way to his own successful NFL career including seven Super Bowl wins, attended the game as a four-year-old and aspired to become a 49er.

In 2002, the NFL ran a series of advertisements promoting the playoffs, using famous plays as a uniting theme. Actor Don Cheadle demonstrated the height of Clark's catch by standing on a stepladder in the end zone.

Clark and Montana re-enacted The Catch in observance of the 25th anniversary of the play as part of San Francisco alumni day activities at halftime of the Minnesota game November 5, 2006, at Candlestick Park.

On October 21, 2018, the 49ers unveiled a statue outside Levi's Stadium depicting The Catch. The statue features two life-size figures, Montana with his arms in the air celebrating the touchdown and, 23 yards away, Clark leaping to make the reception at an estimated height of 11 feet (3.4 m). Clark's catch was a popular photo location among Clemson Tigers fans during their 44–16 win over Alabama in the 2019 College Football Playoff National Championship held at Levi's Stadium.

In 2019, in celebration of the NFL's 100th season, NFL Films ranked The Catch second on its list of the 100 Greatest Plays.

This would be the final professional football game that Vin Scully would call the play by play as well as the final game that Pat Summerall did color commentary before moving to play-by-play announcer for the rest of his broadcast career (Summerall had moved from color commentator to play-by-play midway through the 1974 season, working color commentary here as a substitute for Jack Buck's regular radio partner Hank Stram, who was also Scully's main television broadcast partner during the 1981 season).

Throughout the 1980s and into the 1990s, the play was immortalized in advertisements for Kodak film: a television commercial using a snippet of Barbra Streisand's "The Way We Were" as its jingle and featuring The Catch as shown by NFL Films, and a magazine ad featuring a photo still of The Catch, accompanied by the caption, "The 49ers grab a TD and a title."

In the October 16, 2001 episode "My Old Lady" of the American television sitcom/medical drama Scrubs, when a dying patient David asks if anyone has ever heard of The Catch, Turk comes in and says, "Niners-Cowboys, Joe Montana to Dwight Clark deep in the end-zone, zero time left. Kid, please, don't insult me." Turk later joins David in watching the game.

In 2005, a commercial for the Gatorade sports drink, known as "The Winning Formula", portrayed an alternate version of The Catch, in which the ball bounced out of Clark's fingertips. Following the Gatorade logo, the real version was shown with Dwight Clark's completion. This is also done with Derek Jeter's "flip play" going wide of home plate and Michael Jordan's famous buzzer-beater against Cleveland going off the rim.

On August 5, 2007, The Best Damn Sports Show Period did a special show commemorating the top 50 amazing sports catches of all time. The Catch is listed as #17.

=== Subsequent editions ===
Two subsequent touchdown passes by the 49ers to win home playoff games with the team trailing and facing 3rd and 3 with less than a minute to go have also been named after The Catch:

- The Catch II – Steve Young to Terrell Owens in the 1998 Wild Card Round from 25 yards against the Green Bay Packers with 3 seconds left. The 49ers won 30–27.
- The Catch III – Alex Smith to Vernon Davis in the 2011 Divisional Round from 14 yards against the New Orleans Saints with 9 seconds left. The 49ers won 36–32.

== Officials ==
- Referee: Jim Tunney (#3)
- Umpire: Bob Boylston (#5)
- Head Linesman: Ed Marion (#6)
- Line Judge: Bob Beeks (#16)
- Back Judge: Ray Douglas (#5)
- Side Judge: Dean Look (#9)
- Field Judge: Ed Merrifield (#20)
- Alternate Referee: Gordon McCarter
- Alternate Umpire: Dave Moss

== See also ==
- 49ers–Cowboys rivalry
- Immaculate Reception
- The Helmet Catch
- The Catch (baseball)
- The Block (American Football)
- Freezer Bowl, 1981 AFC Championship game held on the same day
- Minneapolis Miracle
- List of nicknamed NFL games and plays
