= Eric Wright (cornerback, born 1959) =

American football player (born 1959)

No. 21
- Position: Cornerback

Personal information
- Born: April 18, 1959 (age 67); St. Louis, Missouri, U.S.
- Listed height: 6 ft 1 in (1.85 m)
- Listed weight: 185 lb (84 kg)

Career information
- High school: East St. Louis (IL) Assumption
- College: Missouri
- NFL draft: 1981: 2nd round, 40th overall pick

Career history
- San Francisco 49ers (1981–1990)

Awards and highlights
- 4× Super Bowl champion (XVI, XIX, XXIII, XXIV); First-team All-Pro (1985); Second-team All-Pro (1984); 2× Pro Bowl (1984, 1985); 2× First-team All-Big Eight (1979, 1980)

Career NFL statistics
- Interceptions: 18
- Interception yards: 256
- Interception touchdowns: 2
- Fumble recoveries: 5
- Stats at Pro Football Reference

Eric Cortez Wright (born April 18, 1959) is an American former professional football player who was a cornerback for the San Francisco 49ers of the National Football League (NFL). He was selected by the 49ers in the second round of the 1981 NFL draft. Before that, the 6'1", 183 lbs. cornerback from the University of Missouri was an all-Big Eight defensive back in 1979 and '80. He played on three University of Missouri teams that appeared in bowl games, and was selected for Missouri's all-century team in 1990. Wright shares the Missouri record for the most pass interceptions in a game (three vs. San Diego State in 1979).

Considered one of the best cover cornerbacks of his day, Wright played in ten NFL seasons, from 1981 to 1990, all for the 49ers including starting on four Super Bowl-winning teams. Wright made a key defensive play in the NFC Championship game on January 10, 1982, against the Dallas Cowboys. On the Cowboys' last possession in the final minute, after Dwight Clark had made The Catch, Wright made a touchdown-saving horse-collar tackle on Cowboy wide receiver Drew Pearson. The Cowboys fumbled on the next play and the 49ers recovered to preserve the win and propel them into their first Super Bowl.

A two-time Pro Bowler, Wright's peak performance year was during the 1983 season when he intercepted 7 passes for 164 yards and 2 touchdowns. He intercepted passes in Super Bowl XVI and Super Bowl XIX.

Wright missed a majority of the 1986 and 1987 seasons with a deep groin pull and chipped bone in the area, missing all but 4 games during the two-year stretch. But he returned as a starter in 1988 and was on the 49ers-back-to-back Super Bowl-winning teams.

Wright is a member of Alpha Phi Alpha fraternity. He is currently an alumni coordinator for the 49ers.
