= Lexington, Texas =

- Town
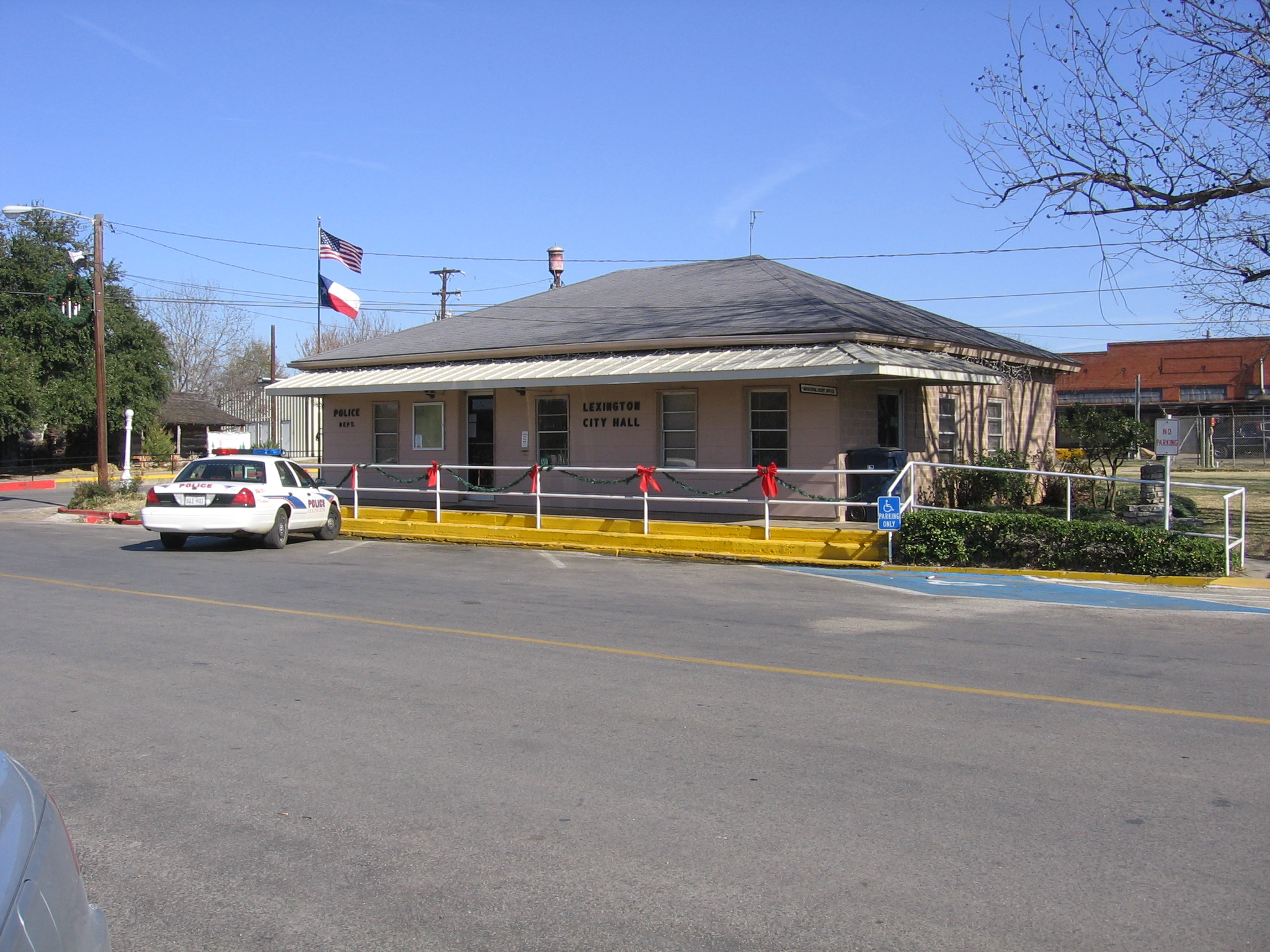
- Lexington City Hall

- Location of Lexington, Texas
- Coordinates: 30°24′50″N 97°0′31″W
- Country: United States
- State: Texas
- County: Lee

Area
  - Total: 1.24 sq mi (3.21 km^{2})
  - Land: 1.24 sq mi (3.21 km^{2})
  - Water: 0 sq mi (0.00 km^{2})
- Elevation: 459 ft (140 m)

Population (2020)
  - Total: 1,217
  - Density: 984.5/sq mi (380.12/km^{2})
- Time zone: UTC-6 (Central (CST))
  - Summer (DST): UTC-5 (CDT)
- ZIP code: 78947
- Area code: 979
- FIPS code: 48-42532
- GNIS feature ID: 2412893
- Website: cityoflexingtontx.com

Lexington is a town in Lee County, Texas, United States. Its population was 1,217 at the 2020 census. Lexington, a cattle trading town, is approximately 40 miles (64 km) west of Bryan.

== History ==
Lexington's first post office was called String Prairie in 1848, named for the surrounding prairie. The first postmaster was veteran and legislator, James Shaw. In 1850, residents changed the name of the settlement to Lexington to honor the location of the first battle of the American Revolution.

== Geography ==
According to the United States Census Bureau, the town has a total area of 1.2 square miles (3.1 km^{2}), all land.

=== Climate ===
The climate in this area is characterized by hot, humid summers and generally mild to cool winters. According to the Köppen climate classification, Lexington has a humid subtropical climate, Cfa on climate maps.

Climate data for Lexington, Texas (1991–2020)
Month	Jan	Feb	Mar	Apr	May	Jun	Jul	Aug	Sep	Oct	Nov	Dec	Year
Mean daily maximum °F (°C)	61.1 (16.2)	64.6 (18.1)	71.6 (22.0)	78.6 (25.9)	85.2 (29.6)	91.7 (33.2)	94.8 (34.9)	96.0 (35.6)	90.3 (32.4)	81.7 (27.6)	70.6 (21.4)	63.0 (17.2)	79.1 (26.2)
Daily mean °F (°C)	49.9 (9.9)	53.6 (12.0)	60.6 (15.9)	67.4 (19.7)	75.2 (24.0)	81.7 (27.6)	84.3 (29.1)	84.7 (29.3)	79.1 (26.2)	69.6 (20.9)	59.2 (15.1)	51.6 (10.9)	68.1 (20.1)
Mean daily minimum °F (°C)	38.6 (3.7)	42.6 (5.9)	49.5 (9.7)	56.2 (13.4)	65.2 (18.4)	71.8 (22.1)	73.7 (23.2)	73.4 (23.0)	67.9 (19.9)	57.6 (14.2)	47.7 (8.7)	40.2 (4.6)	57.0 (13.9)
Average precipitation inches (mm)	3.08 (78)	2.24 (57)	2.94 (75)	2.61 (66)	4.68 (119)	3.21 (82)	2.11 (54)	2.62 (67)	3.07 (78)	4.59 (117)	3.34 (85)	3.23 (82)	37.72 (960)
Average snowfall inches (cm)	0.0 (0.0)	0.0 (0.0)	0.0 (0.0)	0.0 (0.0)	0.0 (0.0)	0.0 (0.0)	0.0 (0.0)	0.0 (0.0)	0.0 (0.0)	0.0 (0.0)	0.0 (0.0)	0.0 (0.0)	0 (0)
Source: NOAA

== Demographics ==
Historical population
Census	Pop.	Note	%±
1870	157		—
1880	179		14.0%
1920	600		—
1930	519		−13.5%
1940	531		2.3%
1950	603		13.6%
1960	711		17.9%
1970	719		1.1%
1980	1,065		48.1%
1990	953		−10.5%
2000	1,178		23.6%
2010	1,177		−0.1%
2020	1,217		3.4%
U.S. Decennial Census; 1850–1900 1910; 1920 1930 1940; 1950 1960 1970; 1980 1990 2000; 2010

Lexington racial composition as of 2020 (NH = Non-Hispanic) (Note: Note: the US Census treats Hispanic/Latino as an ethnic category. This table excludes Latinos from the racial categories and assigns them to a separate category. Hispanics/Latinos can be of any race.)
Race	Number	Percentage
White (NH)	834	68.53%
Black or African American (NH)	110	9.04%
Native American or Alaska Native (NH)	8	0.66%
Asian (NH)	1	0.08%
Some Other Race (NH)	1	0.08%
Mixed/multiracial (NH)	83	6.82%
Hispanic or Latino	180	14.79%
Total	1,217	

As of the 2020 United States census, 1,217 people, 492 households, and 367 families were residing in the town.

As of the census of 2000, there were 1,178 people, 460 households, and 311 families residing in the town. The population density was 992.4 inhabitants per square mile (383.2/km^{2}). The 540 housing units had an average density of 454.9 per square mile (175.6/km^{2}). The racial makeup of the town was 79.88% White, 10.87% African American, 1.10% Native American, 0.08% Asian, 0.17% Pacific Islander, 7.05% from other races, and 0.85% from two or more races. Hispanics or Latinos of any race were 9.42% of the population.

Of the 460 households, 38.7% had children under 18 living with them, 50.9% were married couples living together, 12.0% had a female householder with no husband present, and 32.2% were not families. About 30.2% of all households were made up of individuals, and 14.8% had someone living alone who was 65 or older. The average household size was 2.56, and the average family size was 3.16.

In the town, the age distribution was 32.6% under 18, 7.4% from 18 to 24, 27.8% from 25 to 44, 18.4% from 45 to 64, and 13.8% who were 65 or older. The median age was 33 years. For every 100 females, there were 92.2 males. For every 100 females 18 and over, there were 84.7 males.

The median income for a household in the town was $31,023, and the for a family was $37,917. Males had a median income of $32,083 versus $19,886 for females. The per capita income for the town was $16,765. About 11.1% of families and 15.2% of the population were below the poverty line, including 14.0% of those under age 18 and 11.3% of those age 65 or over.

Calvin Trillin of The New Yorker said that while Lexington is not geographically in the Texas Hill Country, as it is located on ranch land, it "ethnically is." A politician from Lee County told Paul Burka of Texas Monthly that the voting scenario in the area is "the Germans against the Czechs, and the Americans are the swing vote."

== Arts and culture ==
On Saturdays, farmers and ranchers come into Lexington from areas around the town. A cattle auction takes place at 12:30 pm each Saturday. In addition to the many ranches, Lexington is also home to the only flower farm in Lee County (6G Heritage Farm) at the historic original townsite of Nalley, which is no longer a town today.

== Education ==
The town is served by the Lexington Independent School District.

== Notable people ==
- Lyn Collins, soul singer
- Earl Cooper, former NFL player, two-time Super Bowl champion
