= Randy Schleusener =

American football player (born 1957)

No. 53
- Position: Guard

Personal information
- Born: October 23, 1957 (age 69); Rapid City, South Dakota, U.S.
- Listed height: 6 ft 7 in (2.01 m)
- Listed weight: 242 lb (110 kg)

Career information
- High school: Stevens (Rapid City)
- College: Nebraska
- NFL draft: 1981: 9th round, 244th overall pick

Career history
- Cleveland Browns (1981)*
- * Offseason or practice squad member only

Awards and highlights
- Consensus All-American (1980); First-team All-Big Eight (1980); Second-team All-Big Eight (1979)

Rand L. Schleusener (born October 23, 1957) is an American former football offensive lineman. He played for the Nebraska Cornhuskers from 1977 to 1980. He was selected 244th overall in the ninth round of the 1981 NFL draft, but never played in the NFL.

After football, he went on to become a spine surgeon with the Black Hills Orthopedic & Spine Center in Rapid City, South Dakota.
