= Max Anderson (baseball) =

American baseball player (born 2002)

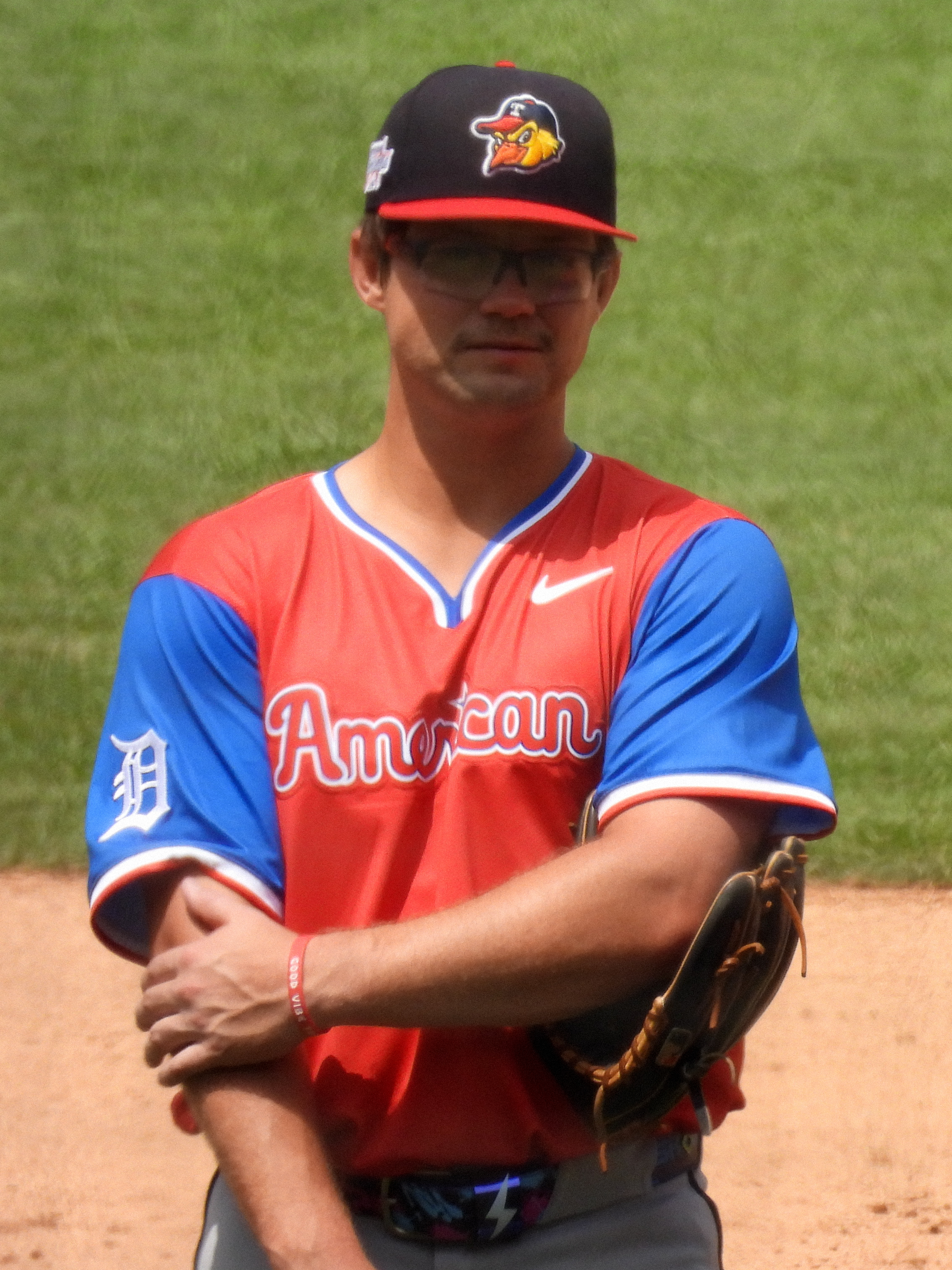
- Anderson playing for the American League Futures in 2026

Detroit Tigers
- Second baseman
- Born: February 28, 2002 (age 24); Kansas City, Missouri, U.S.
- Bats: Right Throws: Right
- Stats at Baseball Reference

Maxwell Edward Anderson (born February 28, 2002) is an American professional baseball second baseman for the Detroit Tigers of Major League Baseball (MLB).

== Amateur career ==
Anderson attended Millard West High School in Omaha, Nebraska and played college baseball for the Nebraska Cornhuskers.

As a freshman at Nebraska in 2021, Anderson appeared in 45 games and hit .332 with seven home runs and 32 RBIs, earning Big Ten Freshman of the Year honors. As a junior for the Cornhuskers in 2023, Anderson had the best season of his collegiate career, having an .414 batting average which led the Big Ten and with a 1.224 on-base plus slugging percentage. He also slugged for a total of 101 hits including 20 doubles, two triples, 21 home runs, and 70 RBI over 57 games. He was a unanimous First-Team All Big Ten selection. In 2021, he played collegiate summer baseball with the Bourne Braves of the Cape Cod Baseball League, and returned to the league in 2022 to play with the Wareham Gatemen, being named a league all-star in both seasons.

== Professional career ==
Anderson was selected by the Detroit Tigers in the second round with the 45th pick in the 2023 Major League Baseball draft. He signed with the Tigers on July 17, 2023 for $1,429,650.

Anderson made his professional debut after signing with the Lakeland Flying Tigers, hitting .289 with two home runs and 12 doubles over 32 games. In 2024, he played the majority of the season with the West Michigan Whitecaps and was promoted to the Erie SeaWolves near the season's end. Over 126 games between both teams, Anderson batted .266 with 11 home runs and 76 RBI. Anderson returned to Erie to open the 2025 season and was promoted to the Toledo Mud Hens in August. After the season, he was assigned to play in the Arizona Fall League with the Scottsdale Scorpions.
