= Pat Tyrance =

American orthopedic surgeon and former football player

Patrick Tyrance
- Born: Patrick Henry Tyrance Jr. July 30, 1968 (age 58); Baltimore, Maryland, U.S.
- Education: University of Nebraska–Lincoln (B.S. Biology/Pre-Med); Harvard Medical School (M.D.); Harvard Kennedy School (M.P.P.); George Washington University (M.B.A.)
- Occupations: Orthopedic surgeon, entrepreneur
- Website: www.tyranceorthopedics.com www.avastarhealth.com

Patrick Henry Tyrance Jr., M.D., M.P.P., M.B.A. (born July 30, 1968) is an American orthopedic surgeon, entrepreneur, and former NCAA Academic All-American linebacker for the University of Nebraska Cornhuskers. He is the founder of Tyrance Orthopedics & Sports Medicine (TOSM) in Florida and Avastar® Health, an integrative health system focused on regenerative medicine, longevity, and youthful aging. Dr. Tyrance was selected by the Los Angeles Rams in the 1991 NFL Draft, but he pursued a career in medicine after earning degrees from Harvard Medical School and Harvard Kennedy School.

== Early life and education ==
Tyrance was born in Baltimore, Maryland, to Patrick and Geraldine Tyrance. He later moved to Omaha, Nebraska, where he attended Millard North High School, excelling in both academics and athletics.

He enrolled at the University of Nebraska–Lincoln in 1986, majoring in biology/pre-med while playing for the Nebraska Cornhuskers football team. As a student-athlete, he maintained a 3.46 GPA and in 1990 received the NCAA Today's Top Six Award, one of the highest scholar-athlete honors.

He earned his Doctor of Medicine (M.D.) from Harvard Medical School and a Master of Public Policy (M.P.P.) in Healthcare Policy from Harvard Kennedy School in 1997. In 2015, he completed an MBA at The George Washington University School of Business.

== Career ==
=== Football ===
At Nebraska, Tyrance recorded 208 total tackles, ranking among the top in school history. He was a two-time All-Big Eight selection (1989, 1990) and served as team captain in 1990.

He was selected by the Los Angeles Rams in the 7th round (201st overall pick) of the 1991 NFL draft.

=== Medical residency ===
Tyrance completed his orthopedic surgery residency at the Harvard Combined Orthopaedic Surgery Program (1999–2002) and interned at Massachusetts General Hospital from 1998 to 1999. He was a member of the Harvard Orthopedics core curriculum committee, contributing to the development of a two-year spine pathology curriculum.

In 2001, he participated in a humanitarian mission to Pristina, Kosovo, performing multiple orthopedic surgeries, including Kosovo’s first total hip arthroplasty.

He was recognized by Harvard Medical School students as an Outstanding Resident Teacher in 2001.

=== Business ===
Tyrance is the founder of Tyrance Orthopedics & Sports Medicine (TOSM), a Florida-based practice specializing in regenerative orthopedics, minimally invasive procedures, and sports medicine.

He is also the founder of Avastar® Health, a health system integrating regenerative medicine, orthobiologics, cellular therapies, PRP, peptides, and longevity-focused clinical protocols.

== Publications ==
Tyrance published in the *American Journal of Public Health*, he examined the economic impact of emergency department use. The study found that emergency department spending represented a small portion of national healthcare costs and argued that limiting ED access would disproportionately affect low-income populations. The authors recommended expanded primary care and preventive health strategies as more effective pathways to reduce system strain.
