= Super Bowl XVI =

1982 Edition of the Super Bowl

San Francisco 49ers (1) (NFC) (13–3)	Cincinnati Bengals (1) (AFC) (12–4)
26	21
Head coach: Bill Walsh	Head coach: Forrest Gregg
	1	2	3	4	Total
SF	7	13	0	6	26
CIN	0	0	7	14	21
- Date: January 24, 1982
- Kickoff time: 4:20 p.m. EST (UTC-5)
- Stadium: Pontiac Silverdome; Pontiac, Michigan
- MVP: Joe Montana, quarterback
- Favorite: 49ers by 1
- Referee: Pat Haggerty
- Attendance: 81,270

Ceremonies
- National anthem: Diana Ross
- Coin toss: Bobby Layne
- Halftime show: Up with People presents "Salute to the 1960s and Motown"

TV in the United States
- Network: CBS
- Announcers: Pat Summerall and John Madden
- Nielsen ratings: 49.1 (85.24 million viewers)
- Market share: 73
- Cost of 30-second commercial: $324,000

Radio in the United States
- Network: CBS Radio
- Announcers: Jack Buck and Hank Stram

Super Bowl XVI was an American football game between the National Football Conference (NFC) champion San Francisco 49ers and the American Football Conference (AFC) champion Cincinnati Bengals to decide the National Football League (NFL) champion for the 1981 season. The 49ers defeated the Bengals by the score of 26–21 to win their first Super Bowl.

The game was played on January 24, 1982, at the Pontiac Silverdome in Pontiac, Michigan, a suburb northwest of downtown Detroit. It was the first Super Bowl to be held in a cold-weather city. The domed stadium saved the crowd at the game from the cold and snowy weather, but the weather did affect traffic and other logistical issues related to the game. Super Bowl XVI also became one of the most watched broadcasts in American television history, with more than 85 million viewers, and a final national Nielsen rating of 49.1 (a 73 share).

For the first time since Super Bowl III, both teams were making their first Super Bowl appearance. The 49ers posted a 13–3 regular season record, and playoff wins over the New York Giants and Dallas Cowboys. The Bengals finished the regular season with a 12–4 record, and had postseason victories over the Buffalo Bills and San Diego Chargers.

Cincinnati's 356 yards of offense to San Francisco's 275 marked the first time in Super Bowl history that the losing team outgained the winning team in total yards. However, the Bengals committed four turnovers to San Francisco's one, and this was a major factor in the outcome. The 49ers scored 20 of their 26 points off of Bengals turnovers.

Super Bowl XVI was initially dominated by the 49ers. Three Cincinnati turnovers helped San Francisco build a then-Super Bowl record 20–0 halftime lead on a touchdown pass and a rushing touchdown from quarterback Joe Montana and two field goals by Ray Wersching. The Bengals rallied in the second half with quarterback Ken Anderson's 5-yard touchdown run and 4-yard touchdown pass, but a third-quarter goal-line stand by the 49ers defense and two more Wersching field goals ultimately decided the game. The Bengals managed to draw within less than a touchdown with 16 seconds remaining but could not recover the ensuing onside kick. Montana was named the Super Bowl MVP, completing 14 of 22 passes for 157 yards and one touchdown, while also rushing for 18 yards and a touchdown on the ground. Cincinnati tight end Dan Ross recorded a then-Super Bowl record 11 receptions (still the most ever by a tight end in a Super Bowl) for 104 yards and two touchdowns.

== Background ==
=== Host selection process ===
The NFL awarded Super Bowl XVI to Detroit on March 13, 1979, at the owners' meetings in Honolulu. For the first time, three Super Bowl host cities were deliberated and selected at the same meeting (XV, XVI and XVII). A total of eight cities submitted bids: New Orleans (Louisiana Superdome), Detroit (Silverdome), Pasadena (Rose Bowl), Los Angeles (Coliseum), Miami (Orange Bowl), Seattle (Kingdome), Dallas (Cotton Bowl) and Houston (Rice Stadium). For the first time, a northern, cold-weather city was picked to host a Super Bowl. The game would be played inside the Pontiac Silverdome, in the Detroit suburb of Pontiac. Former NFL executive director Don Weiss wrote in his book "The Making of the Super Bowl" that the game had been awarded to the Silverdome by the league as a "reward" to the locally headquartered automobile companies Ford Motor Company and Chrysler for their "many years of sponsoring pro football". Automotive executives Tom Murphy (GM), Henry Ford II (Ford), John J. Riccardo (Chrysler), and Gerald C. Meyers (AMC) were all members of the Detroit host committee.

Michigan governor William Milliken, Detroit mayor Coleman Young, and Pontiac mayor Wallace E. Holland were part of the delegation, and notably offered the Silverdome rent-free. Detroit received rousing support from several NFL owners, including George Halas, Art Rooney, and Paul Brown. New Orleans (XV) and Pasadena (XVII) were other cities chosen at the meeting.

After hosting five previous Super Bowls, Miami was noticeably left out, largely due to the deteriorating condition of the Orange Bowl and a hotel room mix-up at Super Bowl XIII two months earlier. Dolphins owner Joe Robbie, locked in an ongoing feud with the city of Miami and Dade County over stadium improvements or construction of a new stadium, actually lobbied against Miami hosting the game. Robbie convinced the other owners to vote down Miami in an effort to gain leverage towards building a new stadium. South Florida would not be selected to host another Super Bowl until Joe Robbie Stadium was built, and it hosted XXIII.

=== San Francisco 49ers ===
San Francisco finished the regular season with a league-best 13–3 record. The 49ers' success surprised many because they finished with a 6–10 record during the previous season and a 2–14 record in 1979 (they even still had home blackouts early on in the 1981 season, the last blackouts for the 49ers to date). A major reason for the team's improvement was the emergence of their young quarterback, Joe Montana. In his third professional season, Montana completed 311 out of 488 passes (a league-leading 63.7 completion percentage) for 3,565 yards and 19 touchdowns (he also threw 12 interceptions). His favorite target was third-year wide receiver Dwight Clark, who had the best season of his career with 85 receptions for 1,104 yards and four touchdowns. Fellow wide receiver Freddie Solomon was also a reliable target with 59 receptions, 969 yards, and eight touchdowns, while tight end Charle Young caught 37 passes for 400 yards and five touchdowns. Running back Ricky Patton was the top rusher on the team with 543 yards and four touchdowns, while also catching 27 passes for 195 yards. Multi-talented running back Earl Cooper also provided the team with a rushing and receiving threat, going for 330 yards on the ground and 477 receiving yards on 51 catches. Much of San Francisco's success was aided by its offensive line of Dan Audick (LT), John Ayers (LG), Fred Quillan (C), Randy Cross (RG), and Keith Fahnhorst (RT).

Although the 49ers had three rookies starting as defensive backs, all three were major threats to opposing offsenses. Carlton Williamson recorded four interceptions, Eric Wright had three and Ronnie Lott, who had the best statistical season of his career, recorded seven interceptions and tied an NFL record by returning three of them for touchdowns. Three-year veteran defensive back Dwight Hicks led the team with nine interceptions, which he returned for 239 yards and a touchdown, giving the secondary a total of 23 picks. Defensive end Fred Dean and linebacker Jack "Hacksaw" Reynolds made it difficult for opposing teams to rush the ball; Dean became a 49er after an in-season trade with the San Diego Chargers and piled up 12 sacks for San Francisco.

The 49ers' defense ranked second in the NFL with 250 points allowed for the season (up from their 27th ranking in 1980). Only the Eagles had a better defense in the league that year, allowing just 221 points.

=== Cincinnati Bengals ===
The Bengals finished with the best regular-season record in the AFC at 12–4. Cincinnati was also a surprise team because, like the 49ers, they had recorded a 6–10 record the previous season. Entering the 1981 season, the Bengals had never won a playoff game in their entire history.

Quarterback Ken Anderson (who had the best season of his career) was the top rated passer in the league and won both the NFL Most Valuable Player Award and the NFL Comeback Player of the Year Award. He completed 300 of 479 passes (62.6%) for 3,754 yards, 29 touchdowns and ten interceptions. Anderson was also an outstanding scrambler, rushing for 320 yards and one touchdown, leading all NFL quarterbacks in rushing yards.

The Bengals' main deep threat was rookie wide receiver Cris Collinsworth, who caught 67 passes for 1,009 yards and eight touchdowns. Tight end Dan Ross had 71 receptions for 910 yards and five touchdowns, while wide receivers Isaac Curtis and Steve Kreider each recorded 37 receptions, combining for a total of 1,129 yards and nine touchdowns. Fullback Pete Johnson was the leading rusher on the team with 1,077 yards and 12 touchdowns. He was also a good receiver out of the backfield, catching 46 passes for 320 yards and four touchdowns. Halfback Charles Alexander contributed 554 all-purpose yards and 28 receptions. A big reason for Cincinnati's production on offense was their line, led by future Hall of Fame tackle Anthony Muñoz and guard Max Montoya. On special teams, punter Pat McInally made the Pro Bowl with a 45.4 yards-per-punt average.

The Bengals also had a good defense that had not given up more than 30 points in any game that season. Their line was anchored by defensive ends Ross Browner and Eddie Edwards, who did a great job stopping the run. Cincinnati's defense was also led by defensive backs Louis Breeden and Ken Riley, and linebackers Bo Harris, Jim LeClair and Reggie Williams, who intercepted four passes and recovered three fumbles.

=== Playoffs ===
The Bengals earned their first playoff victory in team history by defeating the Buffalo Bills 28–21, then beating the San Diego Chargers 27–7 in a game known as the Freezer Bowl because of the −59 °F (−51 °C) wind chill conditions at Riverfront Stadium. Meanwhile, the 49ers defeated the New York Giants 38–24, then narrowly beat the Dallas Cowboys 28–27 on a last-minute touchdown pass known as The Catch.

=== Super Bowl pregame news ===
The 49ers had handily beaten the Bengals in a December game played in Cincinnati and consequently were installed as a one-point favorite. Most experts agreed that both teams were very evenly matched, but many thought Pete Johnson's rushing ability could prove to be the difference. Some observers also pointed out that Ken Anderson was an established 11-year veteran who had just had the best season of his career, while Montana was only just starting to emerge as a top-notch quarterback. Furthermore, Anderson had advanced through the playoffs without throwing a single interception, while Montana had been intercepted four times, three of them in the NFC title game.

During the season, both teams had shown impressive ball security. Cincinnati had the fewest turnovers of any NFL team with 24, while San Francisco ranked second with 25.

Cincinnati head coach Forrest Gregg became the first to play in a Super Bowl and then be a head coach in a Super Bowl. Gregg played in Super Bowls I and II as an offensive tackle for the Green Bay Packers. (He was also on the roster for the Dallas Cowboys for Super Bowl VI, but did not play.) Tom Flores, the winning head coach in Super Bowl XV, was a back-up quarterback for the Kansas City Chiefs in Super Bowl IV, but did not play.

This was the first Super Bowl to feature two first-time participants since Super Bowl III, and there has been only one since: (Super Bowl XX between the Chicago Bears and New England Patriots). If there is another Super Bowl with both conferences featuring first time participants, it would have to match the Detroit Lions vs the Cleveland Browns, Jacksonville Jaguars, or Houston Texans. This was also the only Super Bowl to date between two teams that had losing records the previous season, although Super Bowl XXXIV matched a team that had a losing record in 1998 (the St. Louis Rams) against a team that went 8–8 that year (the Tennessee Titans). This is the most recent Super Bowl in which both teams had never appeared in any AFL or NFL title game before the merger (the 49ers had played in the final championship game of the All-America Football Conference before joining the NFL in 1950).

This was the only Super Bowl to be played at the Pontiac Silverdome. The Super Bowl did return to Michigan for Super Bowl XL, but that game was played at Ford Field in Detroit, which in 2002 had replaced the Silverdome as the home of the Detroit Lions. This was also only the second Super Bowl to not take place in one of the three so-called 'big Super Bowl Cities' (the other was Houston in January 1974). Fourteen of the previous 15 Super Bowls took place in either Miami, Florida, New Orleans, Louisiana or in the Greater Los Angeles Area. The next nine Super Bowls would take place in New Orleans, California, or Florida with Tampa, Florida joining the rotation with Super Bowl XVIII. The next time the Super Bowl would be held in a cold-weather city would be a decade later, with Super Bowl XXVI being held in Minneapolis, Minnesota, on January 26, 1992.

As the designated home team, the Bengals wore their black home uniforms with white pants, while the 49ers donned their road white uniforms with gold pants. This was the only Super Bowl where the 49ers away jerseys featured screen printed numbers. The next Super Bowl where the 49ers were the designated away team, their jerseys featured stitched on numbers. All subsequent Super Bowls where the 49ers have been the away team have featured this ever since.

On the day of the game, a 49ers bus which had Bill Walsh and Montana on board was stuck in traffic due to bad weather and a motorcade carrying then-Vice President George H. W. Bush. As a result, they did not arrive at the stadium until 90 minutes before kickoff time. "Coach Walsh was pretty loose on the bus," Montana told Sports Illustrated after the game. "He said, ‘I’ve got the radio on and we’re leading 7–0. The trainer’s calling the plays.’"

== Broadcasting ==
The game was televised in the United States by CBS, featuring the broadcast team of play-by-play announcer Pat Summerall and color commentator John Madden. This was Madden's Super Bowl debut as a broadcaster. The broadcast also featured the introduction of the telestrator to a national audience, that was named CBS Chalkboard. Still in use today, it enables players and areas of play to be highlighted by the superimposing of lines and rings drawn by a freehand operator.

Hosting coverage for The Super Bowl Today pregame (90 minutes), halftime, and postgame shows was the NFL Today crew of Brent Musburger, Irv Cross, Phyllis George, and Jimmy "The Greek" Snyder, with studio analysis from then-Pittsburgh Steelers quarterback Terry Bradshaw (who faced both teams during the regular season, losing 34-7 to the Bengals and 17-14 to the 49ers; Bradshaw was out injured for Pittsburgh's second meeting vs. Cincinnati) and Roger Staubach, along with reports by Pat O'Brien reporting from San Francisco, Sandy Hill reporting from Cincinnati, and CBS News correspondent Charles Osgood. CBS, for this game, used the theme for the CBS Sports Saturday/Sunday for the intro (CBS had aired a special CBS Sports Sunday prior to the beginning of Super Bowl XVI coverage). At the end of CBS' telecast, they played ABBA's "The Winner Takes It All" over a montage of game and the city of San Francisco.

This Super Bowl was simulcast in Canada on the CTV Television Network, which was airing the Super Bowl for the first time.

The game was broadcast on nationwide radio by CBS and featured the broadcast team of play-by-play announcer Jack Buck and color commentator Hank Stram. Hosting coverage for CBS was done by Dick Stockton. Locally, Super Bowl XVI was broadcast by KCBS-AM in San Francisco with Don Klein and Wayne Walker and by WLW-AM in Cincinnati with Phil Samp and Andy MacWilliams.

The game was one of the most watched broadcasts in American television history, with more than 85 million viewers. The final national Nielsen rating was 49.1 (a 73 share), which is still a Super Bowl record, and ranks second to the final episode of M*A*S*H in 1983 among television broadcasts in general. (Super Bowl LIX holds the record for total U.S. viewership, with an average audience of 128 million, but only earned a rating of 41.7, it did however break the record for audience share with 83). As of 2025, Super Bowl XVI remains the highest rated championship game in the history of the National Football League.

60 Minutes was CBS's Super Bowl lead-out program.

== Entertainment ==
The pregame festivities featured the University of Michigan Band. The band later performed the Canadian National Anthem, which was not televised. Singer Diana Ross (a Detroit native) then performed the U.S. national anthem, which followed a moment of silence in support of the Polish trade union Solidarity following the crackdown by the communist government of Poland on the pro-democracy union. Ross would later perform at the halftime show for Super Bowl XXX. This was the first of two Super Bowls, both held in Michigan, in which two national anthems were performed, and to have a joint Canadian-American armed forces color guard, which consisted of members of the Royal Canadian Mounted Police and Camp Grayling color guards. The coin toss ceremony featured Hall of Fame quarterback Bobby Layne, a star with the Lions from 1950 to 1958.

Up with People provided the halftime entertainment featuring a salute to the 1960s and Motown. This was the first Super Bowl to be played in the Midwest.

== Game summary ==
=== First quarter ===
Cincinnati had the first opportunity to score early in the game. After returning the opening kickoff 17 yards, 49ers running back/returner Amos Lawrence was hit by Bengals linebacker Guy Frazier and fumbled at his own 26-yard line (the first time in a Super Bowl that a turnover took place on the opening kick), where cornerback John Simmons recovered the ball for Cincinnati. Quarterback Ken Anderson then started the drive off with a completion to wide receiver Isaac Curtis for 8 yards, and fullback Pete Johnson's 2-yard run then picked up a first down. Anderson followed with an 11-yard pass to tight end Dan Ross, moving the ball to the 5-yard line. However, running back Charles Alexander was unable to move the ball forward on first down, and then Anderson was sacked by defensive end Jim Stuckey on second down for a 6-yard loss. Facing 3rd-and-goal from the 11, Anderson tried to connect with Curtis in the end zone, but 49ers safety Dwight Hicks intercepted the pass at the 5-yard line and returned it 27 yards to the 32.

From there, quarterback Joe Montana led the 49ers offense to the Cincinnati 47-yard line with three consecutive completions. Then, the 49ers ran a fake reverse/flea flicker play that involved running back Ricky Patton handing the ball off to wide receiver Freddie Solomon, who then handed it off to Montana, who then completed a 14-yard pass to tight end Charle Young at the 33. Three running plays and Montana's 14-yard completion to Solomon moved the ball to the 1-yard line. Montana finished the drive himself with a 1-yard touchdown run, giving San Francisco a 7–0 lead. After forcing the Bengals to punt, the 49ers got the ball back at their own 10-yard line and nearly committed a turnover when Montana's pass intended for wide receiver Dwight Clark was nearly intercepted by cornerback Ken Riley. Had Riley intercepted the pass, he could have walked into the end zone for a game-tying pick-six. On the next play, Patton was tackled for a 7-yard loss by defensive end Ross Browner, backing the 49ers up to their own 3, but a penalty on Cincinnati for too many players on the field on the next play cut the loss to 2 yards. Unlike the previous drive, the 49ers could get nothing going here and they, too, were forced to punt.

=== Second quarter ===
Cincinnati threatened to tie the game early in the second quarter when they got the ball back at their own 49 and advanced across the San Francisco 30-yard line on an 18-yard reception by wide receiver Cris Collinsworth. But after catching a 19-yard pass from Anderson at the 5-yard line, Collinsworth was stripped of the ball by 49ers cornerback Eric Wright, and cornerback Lynn Thomas recovered the fumble. San Francisco then drove for a Super Bowl record 92 yards on Montana's passes to Solomon and Clark for 20 and 12 yards, respectively, as well as a 14-yard run by running back Earl Cooper (playing in what would be his final game as a running back, Cooper would be converted to a tight end before the 1982 season, a position he would play for the rest of his career). The drive ended with Montana's 10-yard touchdown pass to Cooper, increasing the 49ers' lead to 14–0. The play Cooper scored on had not been called by Bill Walsh for two years. Cooper's leaping, celebratory spike of the football after the touchdown became the photo Sports Illustrated used for its post-game cover.

Following Cooper's touchdown came a squib kick by kicker Ray Wersching that was finally recovered by Bengals wide receiver David Verser, who was quickly tackled at the 2-yard line. According to the NFL's highlight film for the game, the 49ers had discovered Wersching's ability to effectively use the squib during their 1981 season opener when a leg injury kept him from fully powering into the football; because that game was also played at the Silverdome, Walsh felt that Wersching would be able to recreate the crazy bounces of a squib on the hard AstroTurf by shortening his stride and seeing what happened. The Bengals managed to escape a safety when Anderson completed a 10-yard pass to Ross from his own end zone, but they could only advance to their 25 before having Pat McInally boot a 47-yard punt, and with just over 4 minutes left in the half, Montana led the 49ers on another scoring drive. First, he completed a 17-yard pass to Clark at the Cincinnati 49. Then Patton ran twice for a total of 10 yards, advancing the ball to the 39-yard line. Montana's next two completions to Clark (his fourth and final reception of the game) and Solomon moved the ball to the 5-yard line. But then Montana threw two straight incompletions, forcing the 49ers to settle for Wersching's 22-yard field goal to increase their lead to 17–0.

With just 15 seconds left in the half, Wersching kicked another squib kick that was muffed by Bengals running back Archie Griffin, and 49ers linebacker Milt McColl recovered the ball on the Cincinnati 4-yard line. As they lined up for a field goal attempt, a false start penalty against San Francisco's offensive line pushed them back 5 yards, but Wersching connected from 26 yards, increasing the 49ers' lead to 20–0, which was the largest halftime lead in Super Bowl history to that date, breaking the previous record of 17 points set by Miami in Super Bowl VIII. The 49ers' 20–0 halftime is the 3rd the largest shutout lead at halftime in Super Bowl history. Since then, five Super Bowls have had teams with leads of at least 20 points at halftime: Super Bowl XX (Chicago led New England 23–3), Super Bowl XXII (Washington led Denver 35–10), Super Bowl XXIV (San Francisco led Denver 27–3), Super Bowl XLVIII (Seattle led Denver 22–0), and Super Bowl LIX (Philadelphia led Kansas City 24-0, now the largest shutout at halftime in Super Bowl history).

=== Third quarter ===
After receiving the opening kickoff of the second half, the Bengals drove 83 yards in 9 plays. Alexander started off the drive with a 13-yard carry, with a facemask penalty on Hicks giving an additional 5 yards. Three plays later, Anderson converted a 3rd-and-4 on a 19-yard pass to wide receiver Steve Kreider, followed by a 13-yard pass to Curtis, and eventually finished the drive himself with a 5-yard touchdown run to cut Cincinnati's deficit to 20–7. This seemed to fire up their defense, which limited the 49ers to only 8 plays and 4 offensive yards for the entire third quarter.

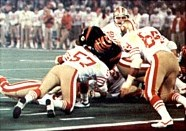
The 49ers making a decisive defensive stop in the 3rd quarter

After the next three possessions ended in punts, Bengals safety Mike Fuller's 17-yard punt return gave Cincinnati the ball at midfield. Two penalties and a 4-yard sack by 49ers defensive end Fred Dean pushed the Bengals back to their own 37, but on 3rd-and-23, Anderson's 49-yard pass to Collinsworth (the longest play of the game) moved the ball to the San Francisco 14. Johnson then later successfully converted on a fourth down run, giving the Bengals a first down on the 3-yard line. On that play, the 49ers only had 10 players on the field because linebacker Keena Turner, who was seriously ill with chicken pox during Super Bowl week, missed a call to enter the game.

However, the San Francisco defense stiffened to keep Cincinnati out of the end zone. On first down, Johnson drove into the line and gained 2 yards down to the 49ers' 1-yard line. The Bengals then tried to run Johnson into the line on second down, but lost a yard when a charging rush prevented the Bengals from executing their blocking assignments. Cincinnati receiver David Verser also missed a blocking audible by Anderson. On third down, 49ers linebacker Dan Bunz made essentially the key defensive play of the game. Anderson faked to Johnson and threw a swing pass out to Alexander, who was isolated on Bunz. Bunz, however, corralled Alexander at the line of scrimmage on an open-field tackle and kept him from reaching the end zone. Highlights showed that Alexander was supposed to have entered the end zone before making his cut, and his early turn prevented a touchdown pass.

After calling a timeout, rather than attempting a field goal on fourth down, the Bengals sent Johnson into the middle of the line one last time. But cornerback Ronnie Lott and linebackers Bunz and Jack "Hacksaw" Reynolds tackled him for no gain, giving the ball back to the 49ers.

=== Fourth quarter ===
The 49ers only gained 8 yards on their ensuing drive, and the Bengals got the ball back after receiving Jim Miller's 44-yard punt at their own 47-yard line. Taking advantage of their great starting field position, the Bengals marched 53 yards in 8 plays, which included a 12-yard reception by Collinsworth, two 9-yard receptions by Ross, and a 14-yard pass interference penalty on Lott. The drive ended with Anderson's 4-yard touchdown pass to Ross, cutting the Bengals' deficit to one score at 20–14 with 10:06 left in regulation.

However, the 49ers responded with a 50-yard, 12-play drive that took 4:41 off the clock and included Montana's 22-yard pass to wide receiver Mike Wilson (his longest and final pass of the game) and seven consecutive running plays. Wilson's reception was a play Walsh specifically designed for the Super Bowl that capitalized on the Bengals doing a long-run coverage on Wilson anytime he ran a pass route over 20 yards; Wilson simply ran 25 yards straight out and then cut back to receive Montana's precision pass. Wersching ended the drive with a 40-yard field goal to put San Francisco back up by two scores, 23–14, with just 5 minutes left in the game.

On the Bengals' first play after receiving the ensuing kickoff, Wright intercepted a pass intended for Collinsworth. After returning the interception 25 yards, Wright fumbled while being tackled by Bengals guard Max Montoya, but 49ers linebacker Willie Harper recovered the ball at the Bengals' 22.

The 49ers then ran the ball on five consecutive plays, taking 3 minutes off the clock, to advance to the Cincinnati 6-yard line. Wersching then kicked his fourth field goal to increase the 49ers' lead to 26–14 with less than 2 minutes left in the game. Wersching's 4 field goals tied a Super Bowl record set by Green Bay Packers kicker Don Chandler in Super Bowl II. Because of his 4 field goals and the close score, this is the only Super Bowl in which the losing team scored more touchdowns than the winning team (Cincinnati 3, San Francisco 2).

Anderson completed six consecutive passes on the Bengals' ensuing drive, the last one a 3-yard touchdown pass to Ross to make the score 26–21. However, none of the receivers on Anderson's completions were able to get out of bounds to stop the clock. By the time Ross scored, only 16 seconds remained in the game. The Bengals tried an onside kick, but Clark recovered the ball for the 49ers, allowing San Francisco to run out the clock and claim their first Super Bowl title.

== Notable performances ==
Montana threw for 157 yards and a touchdown while rushing for 18 yards and another touchdown. The victory made Montana the second-youngest quarterback to win a Super Bowl at the time (just behind his idol Joe Namath; Namath was 25 years, 7 months, and 12 days old when he won Super Bowl III, while Montana was a day older).

Patton was the game's leading rusher, with 55 yards on 17 carries. Wersching scored 14 points on four field goals and two PATs, while his squib kickoffs caused two Cincinnati fumbles. The 49ers recovered one of these fumbles, leading to a field goal. Wright had an interception and forced a fumble. 49ers linebacker Jack Reynolds and Bengals defensive lineman Ross Browner each made eight tackles.

Anderson completed 25 of 34 pass attempts for 300 yards, two touchdowns and two interceptions. He also gained 14 rushing yards and a touchdown on six carries. Anderson's 25 completions and 73.5% completion percentage were both Super Bowl records.

Cris Collinsworth (the game's leading receiver) caught 5 passes for 107 yards. Dan Ross had 11 receptions for 104 yards and two touchdowns. The 11 catches were a Super Bowl record, later tied by several players but only surpassed by Demaryius Thomas in Super Bowl XLVIII with 13 receptions. Ross still holds the record for most catches by a tight end in a Super Bowl game.

Collinsworth and Ross became the second pair of teammates to each have 100 yards receiving in a Super Bowl. John Stallworth and Lynn Swann were the first to do so in Super Bowl XIII.

=== Box score ===
Super Bowl XVI: San Francisco 49ers 26, Cincinnati Bengals 21

Quarter	1	2	3	4	Total
49ers (NFC)	7	13	0	6	26
Bengals (AFC)	0	0	7	14	21

at Pontiac Silverdome, Pontiac, Michigan

- Date: January 24, 1982
- Game time: 4:20 p.m. EST
- Game weather: 72 °F (22 °C), played indoors, domed stadium

Scoring summary

Quarter	Time	Drive			Team	Scoring information	Score	
Quarter	Time	Plays	Yards	TOP	Team	Scoring information	SF	CIN
1	5:52	11	68	5:58	SF	Joe Montana 1-yard touchdown run, Ray Wersching kick good	7	0
2	6:53	12	92	5:29	SF	Earl Cooper 11-yard touchdown reception from Montana, Wersching kick good	14	0
2	0:15	13	61	3:56	SF	22-yard field goal by Wersching	17	0
2	0:02	1	0	0:03	SF	26-yard field goal by Wersching	20	0
3	11:25	9	83	3:27	CIN	Ken Anderson 5-yard touchdown run, Jim Breech kick good	20	7
4	10:06	7	53	3:52	CIN	Dan Ross 4-yard touchdown reception from Anderson, Breech kick good	20	14
4	5:25	10	50	4:32	SF	40-yard field goal by Wersching	23	14
4	1:57	7	16	3:00	SF	23-yard field goal by Wersching	26	14
4	0:16	6	74	1:35	CIN	Ross 3-yard touchdown reception from Anderson, Breech kick good	26	21
"TOP" = time of possession. For other American football terms, see Glossary of American football.							26	21

== Final statistics ==
Sources: NFL.com Super Bowl XVI, Super Bowl XVI Play Finder SF, Super Bowl XVI Play Finder Cin

=== Statistical comparison ===
	San Francisco 49ers	Cincinnati Bengals
First downs	20	24
First downs rushing	9	7
First downs passing	9	13
First downs penalty	2	4
Third down efficiency	8/15	6/12
Fourth down efficiency	0/0	1/2
Net yards rushing	127	72
Rushing attempts	40	24
Yards per rush	3.2	3.0
Passing – Completions/attempts	14/22	25/34
Times sacked-total yards	1–9	5–16
Interceptions thrown	0	2
Net yards passing	148	284
Total net yards	275	356
Punt returns-total yards	1–6	4–35
Kickoff returns-total yards	2–40	7–52
Interceptions-total return yards	2–52	0–0
Punts-average yardage	4–46.3	3–43.7
Fumbles-lost	2–1	2–2
Penalties-total yards	8–65	8–57
Time of possession	30:34	29:26
Turnovers	1	4

=== Individual statistics ===
49ers passing
	C/ATT^{1}	Yds	TD	INT	Rating
Joe Montana	14/22	157	1	0	100.0
49ers rushing
	Car^{2}	Yds	TD	LG^{3}	Yds/Car
Ricky Patton	17	55	0	10	3.24
Earl Cooper	9	34	0	14	3.78
Joe Montana	6	18	1	8	3.00
Bill Ring	5	17	0	7	3.40
Johnny Davis	2	5	0	4	2.50
Dwight Clark	1	–2	0	–2	–2.00
49ers receiving
	Rec^{4}	Yds	TD	LG^{3}	Target^{5}
Freddie Solomon	4	52	0	20	6
Dwight Clark	4	45	0	17	6
Earl Cooper	2	15	1	11	2
Mike Wilson	1	22	0	22	1
Charle Young	1	14	0	14	2
Ricky Patton	1	6	0	6	2
Bill Ring	1	3	0	3	1

Bengals passing
	C/ATT^{1}	Yds	TD	INT	Rating
Ken Anderson	25/34	300	2	2	95.2
Bengals rushing
	Car^{2}	Yds	TD	LG^{3}	Yds/Car
Pete Johnson	14	36	0	5	2.57
Charles Alexander	5	17	0	13	3.40
Ken Anderson	4	15	1	6	3.75
Archie Griffin	1	4	0	4	4.00
Bengals receiving
	Rec^{4}	Yds	TD	LG^{3}	Target^{5}
Dan Ross	11	104	2	16	13
Cris Collinsworth	5	107	0	49	9
Isaac Curtis	3	42	0	21	5
Steve Kreider	2	36	0	19	2
Pete Johnson	2	8	0	5	2
Charles Alexander	2	3	0	3	2

^{1}Completions/attempts ^{2}Carries ^{3}Long gain ^{4}Receptions ^{5}Times targeted

=== Records set ===
The following records were set in Super Bowl XVI, according to the official NFL.com boxscore and the Pro-Football-Reference.com game summary.
Some records have to meet NFL minimum number of attempts to be recognized. The minimums are shown (in parentheses).

Player records set
Passing records
Most completions, game	25	Ken Anderson (Cincinnati)
Highest completion percentage, game, (20 attempts)	73.5% (25–34)	Ken Anderson (Cincinnati)
Receiving records
Most receptions, game	11	Dan Ross (Cincinnati)
Records tied
Most touchdowns, game	2	Dan Ross (Cincinnati)
Most receiving touchdowns, game	2	Dan Ross (Cincinnati)
Most kickoff returns, game	5	David Verser (Cincinnati)
Most field goals made, game	4	Ray Wersching (San Francisco)
Most field goals made, career	4	Ray Wersching (San Francisco)
Most 40-plus yard field goals, game	1	Ray Wersching (San Francisco)

Team records set
Points
Largest halftime lead	20 points	49ers
Touchdowns
Longest touchdown scoring drive	92 yards	49ers
Passing
Most passes completed	25	Bengals
Highest completion percentage (20 attempts)	73.5% (25–34)	Bengals
First Downs
Most first downs	24	Bengals
Records tied
Most points scored, second half	21	Bengals
Most points, fourth quarter	14	Bengals
Fewest points, first half	0	Bengals
Most first downs, penalty	4	Bengals
Most kickoff returns, game	7	Bengals
Most field goals made	4	49ers

Records set, both team totals
	Total	49ers	Bengals
Passing, Both Teams
Most passes completed	39	14	25
First Downs, Both Teams
Most first downs	44	20	24
Most first downs, penalty	6	2	4
Records tied, both team totals
Most field goals made	4	4	0

== Starting lineups ==
Hall of Fame‡

San Francisco	Position	Position	Cincinnati
Offense
Dwight Clark	WR		Cris Collinsworth
Dan Audick	LT		Anthony Muñoz‡
John Ayers	LG		Dave Lapham
Fred Quillan	C		Blair Bush
Randy Cross	RG		Max Montoya
Keith Fahnhorst	RT		Mike Wilson
Charle Young	TE		Dan Ross
Freddie Solomon	WR		Isaac Curtis
Joe Montana‡	QB		Ken Anderson
Ricky Patton	RB		Charles Alexander
Earl Cooper	FB		Pete Johnson
Defense
Jim Stuckey	LE		Eddie Edwards
Archie Reese	NT		Wilson Whitley
Dwaine Board	RE		Ross Browner
Fred Dean‡	LOLB		Bo Harris
Jack Reynolds	LILB		Jim LeClair
Bobby Leopold	RILB		Glenn Cameron
Keena Turner	ROLB		Reggie Williams
Ronnie Lott‡	LCB		Louis Breeden
Eric Wright	RCB		Ken Riley‡
Carlton Williamson	SS		Bobby Kemp
Dwight Hicks	FS		Bryan Hicks

== Officials ==
- Referee: Pat Haggerty #4 second Super Bowl (XIII)
- Umpire: Al Conway #7 third Super Bowl (IX, XIV)
- Head linesman: Jerry Bergman #17 second Super Bowl (XIII)
- Line judge: Bob Beeks #16 second Super Bowl (XIV)
- Back judge: Bill Swanson #20 second Super Bowl (XI)
- Side judge: Bob Rice #19 first Super Bowl
- Field judge: Don Hakes #6 first Super Bowl
- Alternate referee: Gene Barth #14 worked Super Bowl XVIII on the field
- Alternate umpire: Pat Harder #8 did not work Super Bowl on field

NOTE: Officials were numbered separately by position from 1979 to 1981. In 1982, the league reverted to the pre-1979 practice of assigning each official a different number. Bergman, Beeks, Swanson and Hakes all worked together on the same crew during the regular season, a rarity.

== In pop culture ==
- On Saturday Night Live, in Season 7 (1982), John Madden interviews the Cincinnati Bengals (Eddie Murphy, Joe Piscopo, Tim Kazurinsky, Tony Rosato, Brian Doyle-Murray) in their locker room after they've lost Super Bowl XVI and finds them depressed, angry and very dangerous.
- In The Simpsons episode "Homer and Ned's Hail Mary Pass", Homer Simpson and Ned Flanders watch a fictitious Super Bowl XVI, for inspiration to craft a halftime show, where Pac-Man and Ms. Pac-Man get married.
