= Tampa Bay Buccaneers all-time roster =

1,274 players have appeared in at least one regular season or postseason game in the National Football League (NFL) for the Tampa Bay Buccaneers since 1976. This list is accurate through the end of the 2025 NFL season.

== A ==
- Rabih Abdullah
- Clifton Abraham
- Donnie Abraham
- Sam Acho
- Fred Acorn
- Andrew Adams
- Blue Adams
- Gaines Adams
- Kyle Adams
- Michael Adams
- Scott Adams
- Theo Adams
- Jude Adjei-Barimah
- Roberto Aguayo
- Chidi Ahanotu
- Elijah Alexander
- Kwon Alexander
- Beau Allen
- Greg Allen
- Josh Allen
- Roger Allen III
- Will Allen
- Mike Alstott
- Tom Alward
- Brandon Anderson
- Darren Anderson
- Don Anderson
- Gary Anderson
- Jerry Anderson
- Jesse Anderson
- Vince Anderson
- Shane Andrus
- Bryan Anger
- Sam Anno
- Reidel Anthony
- Terry Anthony
- Hasson Arbubakrr
- Obed Ariri
- Adger Armstrong
- Tyji Armstrong
- Kyle Arrington
- Larry Asante
- B. J. Askew
- Antony Auclair
- Cliff Austin
- Darrell Austin
- Eric Austin
- Genard Avery
- Robert Ayers

== B ==
- Billy Baber
- Chris Baker
- Larry Ball
- Johnthan Banks
- Marcus Banks
- Chris Barber
- Michael Barber
- Peyton Barber
- Ronde Barber
- Will Barker
- Reggie Barlow
- Kenjon Barner
- Darian Barnes
- Tommy Barnhardt
- Dave Barrett
- Shaquil Barrett
- Mark Barron
- Steve Bartalo
- Connor Barth
- Graham Barton
- Marco Battaglia
- Carl Bax
- Cole Beasley
- Anthony Becht
- Ian Beckles
- Kendell Beckwith
- Jerry Bell
- Le'Veon Bell
- Quinton Bell
- Ricky Bell
- Theo Bell
- Greg Bellisari
- Caleb Benenoch
- Ryan Benjamin
- Arrelious Benn
- Charles Bennett
- Michael Bennett (born 1978)
- Michael Bennett (born 1985)
- Giovani Bernard
- Rick Berns
- Josh Bidwell
- E. J. Biggers
- Harold Bishop
- Ahmad Black
- Quincy Black
- Brian Blados
- Joe Blahak
- Tom Blanchard
- Dennis Bligen
- Jeb Blount
- LeGarrette Blount
- Mack Boatner
- Juran Bolden
- Devante Bond
- Rik Bonness
- Greg Boone
- John Booty
- Mike Boryla
- Tony Bouie
- Da'Quan Bowers
- Allen Bradford
- Jon Bradley
- Ed Brady
- Jeff Brady
- Tom Brady
- Byron Braggs
- Scot Brantley
- Gene Branton
- Chris Braswell
- Cameron Brate
- Ben Bredeson
- C. J. Brewer
- Teddy Bridgewater
- Doug Brien
- Leon Bright
- Kyle Brindza
- Dezmon Briscoe
- K.J. Britt
- Derrick Brooks
- James Brooks
- Reggie Brooks
- Aaron Brown
- Antonio Brown
- Cedric Brown
- Earnest Brown IV
- John Brown
- Kourtnei Brown
- Lomas Brown
- Rufus Brown
- Selwyn Brown
- Tim Brown
- Joey Browner
- Keith Browner
- Jack Browning
- Darrick Brownlow
- John Bruhin
- Chris Bryan
- Anthony Bryant
- Antonio Bryant
- Matt Bryant
- Deone Bucannon
- Phillip Buchanon
- Curtis Buckley
- Dan Buenning
- Glenn Bujnoch
- John Bullock
- Riley Bullough
- Reggie Burnette
- Keith Burns
- Barney Bussey
- Crezdon Butler
- Gary Butler
- Nate Byham

== C ==
- Mike Calhoun
- Marquez Callaway
- Jake Camarda
- Joe Campbell
- James Cannida
- John Cannon
- Bill Capece
- Alex Cappa
- Steve Cargile
- Gabe Carimi
- Jeff Carlson
- Darryl Carlton
- John Carney
- Rudy Carpenter
- Deveron Carr
- Mark Carrier
- Jay Carroll
- Blanchard Carter
- Brandon Carter
- Bruce Carter
- Carl Carter
- Gerald Carter
- Kevin Carter
- Louis Carter
- Marty Carter
- Steve Carter
- Walter Carter
- Mel Carver
- Antoine Cash
- Jonathan Casillas
- Jeremiah Castille
- Sebastian Castro
- Chandler Catanzaro
- Marq Cerqua
- William Cesare
- Wally Chambers
- Al Chamblee
- Chris Chandler
- Gosder Cherilus
- Anthony Chesley
- Steve Christie
- Jeff Christy
- Ben Chukwuma
- Patrick Chukwurah
- Jack Cichy
- Vinny Ciurciu
- Robert Claiborne
- Brian Clark (born 1958)
- Brian Clark (born 1983)
- Dallas Clark
- Mike Clark
- Randy Clark
- Torin Clark
- Will Clarke
- Adrian Clayborn
- DeVone Claybrooks
- Michael Clayton
- Joey Clinkscales
- Reggie Cobb
- Robert Cobb
- Ross Cockrell
- Sherman Cocroft
- Cosey Coleman
- Sidney Coleman
- Anthony Collins
- Neal Colzie
- Greg Comella
- Jonathan Compas
- Chris Conte
- Jameel Cook
- Bert Cooper
- Mark Cooper
- Marquis Cooper
- Horace Copeland
- Mark Cotney
- Steve Courson
- Oniel Cousins
- Tony Covington
- Torrie Cox
- Tom Crabtree
- Casey Crawford
- Joel Crisman
- Ray Criswell
- Zack Crockett
- Alan Cross
- Randy Crowder
- Tim Crowder
- Devin Culp
- Brad Culpepper
- Willie Culpepper
- Mike Current
- Craig Curry
- DeMarcus Curry
- Eric Curry
- Ivory Curry
- Vinny Curry
- Jacob Cutrera

== D ==
- Kahzin Daniels
- Al Darby
- Chuck Darby
- Kenneth Darby
- Jaelon Darden
- Phil Darns
- Lavonte David
- Anthony Davis (born 1952)
- Anthony Davis (born 1980)
- Carlton Davis
- Charlie Davis
- Don Davis
- Gary Davis
- Jeff Davis
- John Davis
- Johnny Davis
- Khalil Davis
- Reuben Davis
- Ricky Davis
- Sammy Davis
- Tony Davis
- Tyree Davis
- Noah Dawkins
- Lawrence Dawsey
- Skye Dawson
- Jamel Dean
- Steve DeBerg
- Evan Deckers
- Derrick Deese
- Dee Delaney
- Jeff Delaney
- Jeff Demps
- SirVocea Dennis
- Andrew DePaola
- Pierre Desir
- YaYa Diaby
- Jorge Diaz
- Parnell Dickinson
- Scott Dierking
- Evan Dietrich-Smith
- Zac Diles
- Trent Dilfer
- Ken Dilger
- Scott Dill
- Charles Dimry
- Brandon Dixon
- Dwayne Dixon
- Riley Dixon
- Kevin Dogins
- Paul Dombroski
- Demar Dotson
- Santana Dotson
- David Douglas
- Freddie Douglas
- Willie Drewrey
- Demetrius DuBose
- Jimmy DuBose
- Mark Duckens
- Rickey Dudley
- Jamie Duncan
- K. D. Dunn
- Warrick Dunn
- Payne Durham
- Donteea Dye

== E ==
- Ricky Easmon
- Jerry Eckwood
- Andrew Economos
- Bobby Joe Edmonds
- Chase Edmonds
- Mario Edwards
- Mike Edwards
- Emeka Egbuka
- Donnie Elder
- Javien Elliott
- Jerry Ellison
- Bert Emanuel
- Larry English
- Craig Erickson
- Donnie Ernsberger
- Justin Evans
- Mike Evans
- Eric Everett
- Thomas Everett

== F ==
- Jeff Faine
- Dave Farmer
- Karl Farmer
- John Farquhar
- Sean Farrell
- T. J. Fatinikun
- Olakunle Fatukasi
- Dan Feeney
- Matt Feiler
- Darren Fells
- Joe Ferguson
- Howard Fest
- Don Fielder
- Yamon Figurs
- Ryan Fitzpatrick
- Dane Fletcher
- Dallis Flowers
- Nick Folk
- Chris Ford
- Mason Foster
- Leonard Fournette
- Reid Fragel
- Todd France
- Collin Franklin
- John Franklin
- Larry Franklin
- Pat Franklin
- Josh Freeman
- Phil Freeman
- Rocky Freitas
- Isaiah Frey
- William Frizzell
- Scott Frost
- Darrell Fullington
- Tyrek Funderburk
- Chuck Fusina
- Bobby Futrell

== G ==
- Blaine Gabbert
- Russell Gage
- Greg Gaines
- Anthony Gaitor
- Joey Galloway
- Brian Gant
- Kenneth Gant
- Frank Garcia
- Jeff Garcia
- Don Gardner
- Charlie Garner
- Lionel Gates
- Matt Gay
- Kaylon Geiger
- Jeff George
- Jeremiah George
- Chas Gessner
- William Gholston
- David Gibson
- Gary Gibson
- Ulysees Gilbert
- Jimmie Giles
- Garrett Gilkey
- Cam Gill
- Randy Gill
- Trenton Gill
- Willie Gillespie
- John Gilmore
- Charles Gladman
- Ka'Lial Glaud
- Mike Glennon
- Chris Godwin
- Luke Goedeke
- Robert Goff
- Ian Gold
- Jack Golden
- Dashon Goldson
- Jerry Golsteyn
- Jeff Gooch
- Conrad Goode
- Kerry Goode
- Najee Goode
- Sonny Gordon
- Danny Gorrer
- Adam Gotsis
- Ben Gottschalk
- Bruce Gradkowski
- Don Graham
- Earnest Graham
- Martín Gramática
- Darryl Grant
- David Grant
- Frank Grant
- J. T. Gray
- Jerry Gray
- Cyril Grayson
- Cornell Green
- Dave Green
- Hugh Green
- Jacquez Green
- Rogerick Green
- Willie Green
- Mike Greene
- David Greenwood
- Damian Gregory
- Shane Grice
- Antonio Grier
- Brian Griese
- Ryan Griffin
- Brent Grimes
- Randy Grimes
- Cody Grimm
- Rob Gronkowski
- Paul Gruber
- Jimmy Gunn
- Buck Gurley

== H ==
- Wayne Haddix
- Joe Haeg
- Javon Hagan
- Luke Haggard
- Isaac Hagins
- Robert Hainsey
- Bryce Hall
- Logan Hall
- Rhett Hall
- Ron Hall
- Harry Hamilton
- Joe Hamilton
- Marcus Hamilton
- Alonzo Hampton
- Charley Hannah
- Terry Hanratty
- Russell Hansbrough
- Patrick Hape
- Derek Hardman
- Robert Hardy
- Vernon Hargreaves
- Alvin Harper
- Demone Harris
- De'Vante Harris
- Dominique Harris
- Jackie Harris
- Leonard Harris
- Nigel Harris
- Odie Harris
- Paul Harris
- Roy Harris
- Rudy Harris
- William Harris
- Todd Harrison
- John Harvey
- Maurice Harvey
- Andre Hastings
- Andy Hawkins
- Courtney Hawkins
- Jerald Hawkins
- Joe Hawley
- Jovan Haye
- Eric Hayes
- Geno Hayes
- Josh Hayes
- Albert Haynesworth
- Adam Hayward
- Charlie Heck
- Randy Hedberg
- Dave Heffernan
- Vince Heflin
- George Hegamin
- Keith Heinrich
- Ron Heller
- Will Heller
- Robert Herron
- Bob Hewko
- Akiem Hicks
- Alonzo Highsmith
- Bruce Hill
- Michael Hill
- Troy Hill
- Ike Hilliard
- Russ Hochstein
- Sterling Hofrichter
- Mike Hold
- Devin Holland
- Trindon Holliday
- Derek Holloway
- Steve Holloway
- Ron Holmes
- John Holt
- Greg Horton
- Kevin House
- Chris Hovan
- Bobby Howard
- Carl Howard
- O. J. Howard
- William Howard
- John Howell
- Jim Huddleston
- Tanner Hudson
- Gary Huff
- Josh Huff
- Kareem Huggins
- John Hughes
- Adam Humphries
- Charlie Hunt
- John Hunt
- Brice Hunter
- Eddie Hunter
- Jeff Hunter
- Michael Husted
- Scott Hutchinson
- Ishmael Hyman

== I ==
- Donald Igwebuike
- Godwin Igwebuike
- Steve Ingram
- Earl Inmon
- Corvey Irvin
- Bucky Irving
- Tim Irwin
- Keenan Isaac
- Ray Isom
- Corey Ivy
- Christian Izien

== J ==
- David Jackson
- DeSean Jackson
- Dexter Jackson (born 1977)
- Dexter Jackson (born 1986)
- Nick Jackson
- Noah Jackson
- Tanard Jackson
- Tyoka Jackson
- Vincent Jackson
- Cam Jacobs
- Mike James
- Larry Jameson
- Rakim Jarrett
- Curt Jarvis
- Julian Jenkins
- Kerry Jenkins
- Mike Jenkins
- Stanford Jennings
- Tim Jennings
- Ryan Jensen
- Austin Johnson
- Brad Johnson
- Cecil Johnson
- Dennis Johnson
- Dirk Johnson
- Essex Johnson
- Fred Johnson
- George Johnson
- Greg Johnson
- Hoss Johnson
- Isaiah Johnson
- James-Michael Johnson
- Josh Johnson
- Kameron Johnson
- Keyshawn Johnson
- Leonard Johnson
- Marcus Johnson
- Melvin Johnson
- Michael Johnson
- Randy Johnson
- Rob Johnson
- Tez Johnson
- Tracy Johnson
- Tyler Johnson
- Doug Jolley
- Deion Jones
- Gordon Jones
- Howard Jones
- Julio Jones
- LaCurtis Jones
- Marcus Jones
- Mark Jones
- Rod Jones
- Roger Jones
- Ronald Jones II
- Sean Jones
- Thomas Jones
- Vi Jones
- Victor Jones
- Andrew Jordan
- Curtis Jordan
- David Jordan
- Michael Jordan
- Davin Joseph
- Ed Judie
- Cato June
- E. J. Junior
- Joe Jurevicius

== K ==
- Mohamed Kamara
- Calijah Kancey
- Ken Kaplan
- Kevin Kellin
- Brian Kelly
- Bobby Kemp
- Vince Kendrick
- Josh Keyes
- Tyrone Keys
- Ko Kieft
- Blair Kiel
- Joe King
- Shaun King
- Tavarres King
- Tim King
- Charles Kirby
- Elijah Klein
- Michael Koenen
- Bill Kollar
- Jeff Komlo
- Niko Koutouvides
- Larry Kubin

== L ==
- Sandy LaBeaux
- DaVonte Lambert
- Dan Land
- Sean Landeta
- Derek Landri
- Jorvorskie Lane
- Danny Lansanah
- Spencer Larsen
- Ted Larsen
- Larry Lawrence
- Nate Lawrie
- Jamie Lawson
- Allan Leavitt
- Richard LeCounte
- Jeremiah Ledbetter
- Charles Lee
- James Lee
- Shawn Lee
- Byron Leftwich
- Tyrone Legette
- Matt Lehr
- Mike Lemon
- Orie Lemon
- Brian Leonard
- Jim Leonard
- Mike Levenseller
- Nick Leverett
- Lazarius Levingston
- Dave Lewis
- Garry Lewis
- LeQuan Lewis
- Myron Lewis
- Reggie Lewis
- Michael Liedtke
- Rian Lindell
- Chris Lindstrom
- Everett Little
- David Logan
- T.J. Logan
- Erik Lorig
- Sean Love
- Quentin Lowry
- Chad Lucas
- Kregg Lumpkin
- Cameron Lynch
- Corey Lynch
- John Lynch

== M ==
- J. D. Maarleveld
- Elbert Mack
- Milton Mack
- Mossis Madu
- Alex Magee
- Brandon Magee
- Calvin Magee
- Sean Mahan
- Wesly Mallard
- Rick Mallory
- Robert Malone
- Jason Maniecki
- Logan Mankins
- Dexter Manley
- Brison Manor
- Ali Marpet
- Marvin Marshall
- Cecil Martin
- Don Martin
- Doug Martin
- Josh Martin
- Freddie Martino
- Lonnie Marts
- Eugene Marve
- Matthew Masifilo
- Shaq Mason
- Cody Mauch
- Alvin Maxson
- Tony Mayberry
- Baker Mayfield
- Corey Mayfield
- Martin Mayhew
- Derrick McAdoo
- Fred McAfee
- Ed McAleney
- Fred McCallister
- Keith McCants
- Keenan McCardell
- John McCargo
- Robert McClain
- Zyon McCollum
- Josh McCown
- Luke McCown
- Gerald McCoy
- LeSean McCoy
- Matt McCoy
- Kelcie McCray
- Randall McDaniel
- Tony McDaniel
- Sean McDermott
- Brandon McDonald
- Clinton McDonald
- Darnell McDonald
- Bradley McDougald
- Anthony McDowell
- Codey McElroy
- Kimario McFadden
- Booger McFarland
- Lee McGriff
- Mike McGruder
- Tom McHale
- Toddrick McIntosh
- John McKay, Jr.
- Vito McKeever
- Tyrone McKenzie
- Chase McLaughlin
- John McLaughlin
- Steve McLendon
- Kevin McLeod
- Jalen McMillan
- Rod McNeill
- Charles McRae
- Steven Means
- Dan Medlin
- Henry Melton
- Jamon Meredith
- Kaevon Merriweather
- Jaydon Mickens
- Frank Middleton
- Terdell Middleton
- Scott Milanovich
- Herb Miller
- Roy Miller
- Ryan Miller
- Scotty Miller
- Solomon Miller
- Charles Mincy
- Kevin Minter
- Aaron Mitchell
- Alvin Mitchell
- Jeff Modesitt
- Chris Mohr
- John Molchon
- Sankar Montoute
- Bob Moore
- Dave Moore
- David Moore
- Dre Moore
- Kyle Moore
- Manfred Moore
- Maulty Moore
- Sterling Moore
- Aaron Morgan
- Karl Morgan
- Brett Moritz
- Tom Morris
- Benjamin Morrison
- Michael Morton
- Rick Moser
- Winston Moss
- Parnell Motley
- Larry Mucker
- Frank Murphy
- Kevin Murphy
- Louis Murphy
- Shawn Murphy
- Yo Murphy
- Sean Murphy-Bunting
- Eddie Murray
- Patrick Murray
- Brandon Myers

== N ==
- Dana Nafziger
- Peter Najarian
- Carl Nassib
- Keanu Neal
- Lorenzo Neal
- Ryan Neal
- Ryan Nece
- Anthony Nelson
- Bob Nelson
- Royce Newman
- Tim Newton
- Gerald Nichols
- Donte Nicholson
- Hardy Nickerson
- Carl Nicks
- Danny Noble
- Fred Nordgren
- Jack Novak
- Mike Nugent
- Rakeem Nunez-Roches

== O ==
- Roman Oben
- Jim Obradovich
- Pat O'Connor
- Paul O'Connor
- Ifeadi Odenigbo
- Jason Odom
- Neil O'Donoghue
- Matt O'Dwyer
- Kevin Ogletree
- Dare Ogunbowale
- Frank Okam
- Deji Olatoye
- Frank Oliver
- Maurice Oliver
- Patrick Omameh
- Dan Orlovsky
- Dwayne O'Steen
- Cade Otton
- James Owens
- Morris Owens
- Chris Owusu

== P ==
- Walter Packer
- Fred Pagac
- Eric Page
- Lee Paige
- Mitch Palmer
- Trey Palmer
- Kevin Pamphile
- Anthony Parker
- Jeff Parker
- Preston Parker
- Jeff Parks
- Jacob Parrish
- Roscoe Parrish
- Solomon Patton
- Markus Paul
- Sam Paulescu
- Dave Pear
- Kalvin Pearson
- Danny Peebles
- Donald Penn
- Leon Pennington
- George Peoples
- Bruce Perkins
- Breshad Perriman
- Cal Peterson
- Greg Peterson
- Jim Peterson
- Luke Petitgout
- Jermaine Phillips
- Zack Pianalto
- Jason Pierre-Paul
- Pete Pierson
- Reggie Pierson
- Frank Pillow
- Bradley Pinion
- Cleveland Pinkney
- Sabby Piscitelli
- Chuck Pitcock
- Michael Pittman
- Derrek Pitts
- Darryl Pollard
- Rufus Porter
- Hank Poteat
- Benning Potoa'e
- Keith Powe
- Marvin Powell
- Chris Pressley
- Brian Price
- Shawn Price
- Mike Prior
- Garry Puetz
- Don Pumphrey
- Ryan Purvis
- Jim Pyne

== Q ==
- Shelton Quarles
- Marcus Quinn

== R ==
- Bruce Radford
- Mike Rae
- George Ragsdale
- Bobby Rainey
- Donovan Raiola
- Jim Ramey
- Jose Ramirez
- Ervin Randle
- Tim Rattay
- John Reaves
- Dave Reavis
- Haason Reddick
- Beasley Reece
- Danny Reece
- Nick Reed
- Bernard Reedy
- Booker Reese
- Steve Reese
- Bruce Reimers
- Darrelle Revis
- Ricky Reynolds
- Errict Rhett
- Rodney Rice
- Simeon Rice
- Greg Richardson
- Harold Ricks
- Doug Riesenberg
- Charles Riggins
- Alan Risher
- David Rivers
- Mike Roberg
- Derrick Roberson
- Elijah Roberts
- Greg Roberts
- Damien Robinson
- Glenn Robinson
- Greg Robinson
- Josh Robinson
- Mark Robinson
- Rashard Robinson
- Travaris Robinson
- Reggie Roby
- Mirro Roder
- Jacquizz Rodgers
- Evan Rodriguez
- Glenn Rogers
- Reggie Rogers
- Benji Roland
- Henry Rolling
- Wardell Rouse
- Mark Royals
- Mazio Royster
- Conrad Rucker
- Dwayne Rudd
- Council Rudolph
- Kyle Rudolph
- Reggie Rusk
- Chapelle Russell
- J. J. Russell
- Ryan Russell
- Barrett Ruud
- Logan Ryan
- Tim Ryan
- Larry Ryans
- Dan Ryczek

== S ==
- Tony Samuels
- Garrison Sanborn
- Gene Sanders
- Cairo Santos
- Warren Sapp
- Cedric Saunders
- Josh Savage
- Spencer Schnell
- Bill Schroeder
- Jake Schum
- Kurt Schumacher
- Todd Scott
- Trevor Scott
- Ray Seals
- Arron Sears
- Austin Seferian-Jenkins
- Dewey Selmon
- Lee Roy Selmon
- Deadrin Senat
- Stanley Shakespeare
- Josh Shaw
- Joe Shearin
- Russell Shepard
- Sterling Shepard
- Edell Shepherd
- Richard Sherman
- A. Q. Shipley
- Jordan Shipley
- Josh Shirley
- Laval Short
- Cecil Shorts
- Mike Shumann
- Lawrence Sidbury
- Dan Sileo
- Sealver Siliga
- Nilo Silvan
- Mike Simmonds
- Elijah Simmons
- Chris Simms
- Charles Sims
- Jim Sims
- Ryan Sims
- Alshermond Singleton
- Jim Skow
- Justin Skule
- Ian Smart
- Alex Smith
- Antone Smith
- Barry Smith
- Clifton Smith
- Corey Smith
- Daryl Smith
- Don Smith
- Donovan Smith
- Dwight Smith
- Herman Smith
- Jacquies Smith
- Jeff Smith
- Johnny Ray Smith
- Justin Smith
- Michael Smith
- Reggie Smith
- Ryan Smith
- Sean Smith
- Shevin Smith
- Tykee Smith
- Ray Snell
- Jesse Solomon
- Scott Solomon
- Mike Solwold
- Jerald Sowell
- Jeff Spek
- Akeem Spence
- Blake Spence
- Noah Spence
- Evan Spencer
- Greg Spires
- Danny Spradlin
- Ron Springs
- Micheal Spurlock
- Steve Spurrier
- Dave Stalls
- Sylvester Stamps
- Tony Stargell
- Stephen Starring
- Robert Staten
- Aaron Stecker
- Mike Stensrud
- Darnell Stephens
- Travis Stephens
- Todd Steussie
- Jerramy Stevens
- Darian Stewart
- M. J. Stewart
- Ben Stille
- Matt Stinchcomb
- Aaron Stinnie
- Luke Stocker
- Ken Stone
- Byron Storer
- Maurice Stovall
- Eric Streater
- Sammie Stroughter
- Dan Stryzinski
- Grant Stuard
- Mark Studaway
- Ryan Succop
- Ndamukong Suh
- Mike Sullivan
- Ivory Sully
- Harry Swayne
- D. J. Swearinger
- J. R. Sweezy
- Larry Swider
- Craig Swoope

== T ==
- Aqib Talib
- Keith Tandy
- Darryl Tapp
- Lars Tate
- Willy Tate
- Adarius Taylor
- Gene Taylor
- Jay Taylor
- Rob Taylor
- Pat Teague
- Daniel Te'o-Nesheim
- Jeb Terry
- Vinny Testaverde
- Marcus Thigpen
- Broderick Thomas
- Derrick Thomas
- Ed Thomas
- George Thomas
- Kelly Thomas
- Kevin Thomas
- Lamar Thomas
- Norris Thomas
- Robb Thomas
- Tavierre Thomas
- Zach Thomas
- Deven Thompkins
- Cody Thompson
- Jack Thompson
- Leroy Thompson
- Robert Thompson
- Van Tiffin
- Calvin Tiggle
- Carson Tinker
- Pat Tomberlin
- Pat Toomay
- Kyle Trask
- Zach Triner
- Paul Tripoli
- Jeremiah Trotter
- Ben Troupe
- Jeremy Trueblood
- Joe Tryon-Shoyinka
- Sean Tucker
- Tom Tupa
- Dan Turk
- Calvin Turner
- Nolan Turner
- Vernon Turner
- Miles Turpin
- Perry Tuttle
- Andre Tyler

== U ==
- George Uko
- Tiquan Underwood
- Morris Unutoa
- Regan Upshaw

== V ==
- Eric Vance
- Ke'Shawn Vaughn
- Vita Vea
- Alterraun Verner
- David Verser
- Kindle Vildor
- Keydrick Vincent

== W ==
- John Wade
- Anthony Walker Jr.
- Jackie Walker
- Kenyatta Walker
- Kevin Walker
- Cody Wallace
- Herkie Walls
- Steve Walsh
- Brandon Walton
- Tim Wansley
- Channing Ward
- Derrick Ward
- John Ward
- T. J. Ward
- DJ Ware
- Ron Warner
- David Warnke
- Jeremiah Warren
- Paris Warren
- Chris Washington
- Mike Washington
- Todd Washington
- Earl Watford
- Dekoda Watson
- Justin Watson
- Markees Watts
- Chuck Weatherspoon
- Nate Webster
- Casey Weldon
- Arthur Wells
- David Wells
- Josh Wells
- Jack Wender
- Leonard Wester
- Rhondy Weston
- Mark Wheeler
- Ronyell Whitaker
- Brad White
- Charlie White
- Devin White
- Dewayne White
- Jamel White
- Jeris White
- Markus White
- Rachaad White
- Robb White
- Steve White
- Stylez White
- Jordan Whitehead
- Jason Whittle
- Daniel Wilcox
- James Wilder
- Jimmy Wilkerson
- Mazzi Wilkins
- Cadillac Williams
- David Williams
- D. J. Williams
- Doug Williams
- Ed Williams
- Jason Williams
- Jimmy Williams
- Josh Williams
- Karl Williams
- Marcus Williams
- Mike Williams
- Roland Williams
- Ken Willis
- Bernard Wilson
- Bobo Wilson
- C. J. Wilson
- Charles Wilson
- Karl Wilson
- Robert Wilson
- Rod Wilson
- Shaun Wilson
- Steve Wilson
- Jeff Winans
- Jamie Winborn
- Antoine Winfield Jr.
- Stan Winfrey
- Kellen Winslow II
- Jameis Winston
- Tristan Wirfs
- Rashad Wisdom
- Mark Witte
- Nathan Wonsley
- Richard Wood
- Al Woods
- Rick Woods
- Roscoe Word
- Vince Workman
- Jerel Worthy
- Blidi Wreh-Wilson
- Adrian Wright
- Charles Wright
- Eric Wright
- Major Wright
- Owen Wright
- Tim Wright
- Jerry Wunsch
- Willie Wyatt
- Ellis Wyms
- Milton Wynn

== Y ==
- George Yarno
- Deon Yelder
- Garo Yepremian
- Todd Yoder
- Floyd Young
- Kenny Young
- Randy Young
- Steve Young (born 1953)
- Steve Young (born 1961)
- Christian Yount

== Z ==
- Eric Zeier
- Jim Zorn
- Jeremy Zuttah
