= Tampa Bay Buccaneers draft history =

This page is a list of the Tampa Bay Buccaneers NFL draft selections. The first draft the Buccaneers participated in was 1976, in which they made defensive end Lee Roy Selmon of Oklahoma their first-ever selection.

== Key ==
| = Pro Bowler or All-Pro |
| = MVP |
| = Hall of Famer |

== 1976 draft ==
| Round | Pick # | Overall | Name | Position | College |
|---|---|---|---|---|---|
| 1 | 1 | 1 | Lee Roy Selmon | Defensive end | Oklahoma |
| 2 | 2 | 30 | Jimmy DuBose | Running back | Florida |
| 2 | 32 | 60 | Dewey Selmon | Linebacker | Oklahoma |
| 3 | 31 | 91 | Steve Maughan | Linebacker | Utah State |
| 4 | 29 | 121 | Richard Appleby | Wide receiver | Georgia |
| 4 | 32 | 124 | Everett Little | Guard | Houston |
| 5 | 1 | 125 | Michael Kelson | Defensive back | West Texas State |
| 5 | 30 | 154 | Steve Wilson | Center | Georgia |
| 6 | 2 | 158 | Curtis Jordan | Safety | Texas Tech |
| 7 | 1 | 183 | Parnell Dickinson | Quarterback | Mississippi Valley State |
| 9 | 1 | 238 | Bruce Welch | Guard | Texas A&M |
| 10 | 2 | 267 | Sid Smith | Linebacker | Brigham Young |
| 11 | 1 | 292 | Melvin Washington | Defensive back | Colorado State |
| 12 | 2 | 321 | George Ragsdale | Running back | North Carolina A&T |
| 13 | 1 | 348 | Brad Jenkins | Tight end | Nebraska |
| 14 | 2 | 377 | Carl Roaches | Wide receiver | Texas A&M |
| 15 | 1 | 404 | Bob Dzierzak | Defensive tackle | Utah State |
| 16 | 2 | 433 | Tommy West | Linebacker | Tennessee |
| 17 | 1 | 460 | Jack Berry | Quarterback | Washington & Lee |

== 1977 draft ==
| Round | Pick # | Overall | Name | Position | College |
|---|---|---|---|---|---|
| 1 | 1 | 1 | Ricky Bell | Running back | USC |
| 2 | 1 | 29 | Dave Lewis | Linebacker | USC |
| 3 | 1 | 57 | Charley Hannah | Defensive end | Alabama |
| 8 | 1 | 196 | Randy Hedberg | Quarterback | Minot State |
| 9 | 1 | 224 | Byron Hemingway | Linebacker | Boston College |
| 9 | 28 | 251 | Larry Mucker | Wide receiver | Arizona State |
| 10 | 1 | 252 | Robert Morgan | Running back | Florida |
| 10 | 16 | 267 | Aaron Ball | Linebacker | Fullerton State |
| 11 | 1 | 280 | Chuck Rodgers | Defensive back | North Dakota State |
| 12 | 1 | 308 | Chip Sheffield | Wide receiver | Lenoir-Rhyne |

== 1978 draft ==
| Round | Pick # | Overall | Name | Position | College |
|---|---|---|---|---|---|
| 1 | 17 | 17 | Doug Williams | Quarterback | Grambling |
| 2 | 2 | 30 | Johnny Davis | Running back | Alabama |
| 2 | 16 | 44 | Brett Moritz | Guard | Nebraska |
| 6 | 24 | 162 | Elijah Marshall | Wide receiver | North Carolina State |
| 8 | 2 | 196 | John McGriff | Linebacker | Miami (FL) |
| 9 | 1 | 223 | Willie Taylor | Wide receiver | Pittsburgh |
| 10 | 2 | 252 | Aaron Brown | Linebacker | Ohio State |
| 12 | 2 | 308 | Kevin McLee | Running back | Georgia |

== 1979 draft ==
| Round | Pick # | Overall | Name | Position | College |
|---|---|---|---|---|---|
| 2 | 5 | 33 | Greg Roberts | Guard | Oklahoma |
| 2 | 6 | 34 | Gordon Jones | Wide receiver | Pittsburgh |
| 3 | 4 | 60 | Jerry Eckwood | Running back | Arkansas |
| 3 | 22 | 78 | Reginald Lewis | Defensive end | North Texas State |
| 3 | 24 | 80 | Rick Berns | Running back | Nebraska |
| 5 | 23 | 133 | Chuck Fusina | Quarterback | Penn State |
| 8 | 25 | 217 | Gene Sanders | Defensive tackle | Texas A&M |
| 9 | 5 | 225 | Henry Vereen | Wide receiver | UNLV |
| 11 | 6 | 281 | Bob Rippentrop | Tight end | Fresno State |
| 12 | 4 | 307 | David Logan | Defensive tackle | Pittsburgh |

== 1980 draft ==
| Round | Pick # | Overall | Name | Position | College |
|---|---|---|---|---|---|
| 1 | 22 | 22 | Ray Snell | Guard | Wisconsin |
| 2 | 21 | 49 | Kevin House | Wide receiver | Southern Illinois |
| 3 | 20 | 76 | Scot Brantley | Linebacker | Florida |
| 4 | 19 | 102 | Larry Flowers | Safety | Texas Tech |
| 7 | 21 | 186 | Jim Leonard | Center | Santa Clara |
| 8 | 20 | 213 | Derrick Goddard | Defensive back | Drake |
| 9 | 19 | 240 | Gerald Carter | Wide receiver | Texas A&M |
| 10 | 18 | 267 | Andy Hawkins | Linebacker | Texas A&I |
| 10 | 25 | 275 | Brett Davis | Running back | UNLV |
| 11 | 22 | 299 | Terry Jones | Defensive end | Central State (OK) |
| 12 | 21 | 326 | Gene Coleman | Defensive back | Miami (FL) |

== 1981 draft ==
| Round | Pick # | Overall | Name | Position | College |
|---|---|---|---|---|---|
| 1 | 7 | 7 | Hugh Green | Linebacker | Pittsburgh |
| 2 | 6 | 34 | James Wilder Sr. | Running back | Missouri |
| 4 | 6 | 89 | John Holt | Cornerback | West Texas State |
| 8 | 6 | 199 | Denver Johnson | Offensive tackle | Tulsa |
| 9 | 7 | 228 | Mike Ford | Quarterback | SMU |
| 10 | 6 | 254 | Ken McCune | Defensive end | Texas |
| 11 | 7 | 283 | Johnny Ray Smith | Defensive back | Lamar |
| 12 | 6 | 310 | Brad White | Defensive tackle | Tennessee |

== 1982 draft ==
| Round | Pick # | Overall | Name | Position | College |
|---|---|---|---|---|---|
| 1 | 17 | 17 | Sean Farrell | Guard | Penn State |
| 2 | 5 | 32 | Booker Reese | Defensive end | Bethune-Cookman |
| 3 | 19 | 74 | Jerry Bell | Tight end | Arizona State |
| 3 | 28 | 83 | John Cannon | Defensive end | William & Mary |
| 4 | 20 | 103 | Dave Barrett | Running back | Houston |
| 5 | 17 | 128 | Jeff David | Linebacker | Clemson |
| 6 | 19 | 158 | Andre Tyler | Wide receiver | Stanford |
| 7 | 18 | 185 | Tom Morris | Defensive back | Michigan State |
| 8 | 17 | 212 | Kelvin Atkins | Linebacker | Illinois |
| 9 | 19 | 242 | Bob Lane | Quarterback | Northeast Louisiana |
| 12 | 19 | 325 | Michael Morton | Running back | UNLV |

== 1983 draft ==
| Round | Pick # | Overall | Name | Position | College |
|---|---|---|---|---|---|
| 2 | 17 | 45 | Randy Grimes | Center | Baylor |
| 3 | 16 | 72 | Jeremiah Castille | Defensive back | Alabama |
| 4 | 15 | 99 | Kelly Thomas | Offensive tackle | USC |
| 5 | 19 | 131 | Tony Chickillo | Defensive tackle | Miami (FL) |
| 6 | 8 | 148 | Rheugene Branton | Wide receiver | Texas Southern |
| 6 | 18 | 158 | Ken Kaplan | Offensive tackle | New Hampshire |
| 7 | 17 | 185 | Weldon Ledbetter | Running back | Oklahoma |
| 8 | 16 | 212 | John Samuelson | Linebacker | Azusa Pacific |
| 9 | 14 | 238 | Hasson Arbubakrr | Defensive tackle | Texas Tech |
| 10 | 19 | 270 | Darius Durham | Wide receiver | San Diego State |
| 11 | 18 | 297 | Mark Witte | Tight end | North Texas State |
| 12 | 17 | 324 | John Higginbotham | Defensive tackle | Northeastern Oklahoma State |

== 1984 draft ==
| Round | Pick # | Overall | Name | Position | College |
|---|---|---|---|---|---|
| 2 | 2 | 30 | Keith Browner | Linebacker | USC |
| 3 | 1 | 57 | Fred Acorn | Defensive back | Texas |
| 4 | 23 | 107 | Michael Gunter | Running back | Tulsa |
| 4 | 28 | 112 | Ron Heller | Offensive tackle | Penn State |
| 6 | 2 | 142 | Chris Washington | Linebacker | Iowa State |
| 7 | 1 | 169 | Jay Carroll | Tight end | Minnesota |
| 8 | 2 | 198 | Fred Robinson | Linebacker | Miami (FL) |
| 9 | 1 | 225 | Rick Mallory | Guard | Washington |
| 10 | 2 | 254 | Jim Gallery | Kicker | Minnesota |
| 11 | 1 | 281 | Blair Kiel | Quarterback | Notre Dame |
| 12 | 2 | 310 | Thad Jemison | Wide receiver | Ohio State |

== 1985 draft ==
| Round | Pick # | Overall | Name | Position | College |
|---|---|---|---|---|---|
| 1 | 5 | 5 | Ron Holmes | Defensive end | Washington |
| 3 | 8 | 64 | Ervin Randle | Linebacker | Baylor |
| 4 | 8 | 92 | Mike Heaven | Defensive back | Illinois |
| 7 | 8 | 176 | Mike Prior | Defensive back | Illinois State |
| 8 | 8 | 204 | Phil Freeman | Wide receiver | Arizona State |
| 9 | 8 | 232 | Steve Calabria | Quarterback | Colgate |
| 10 | 8 | 260 | Donald Igwebuike | Kicker | Clemson |
| 11 | 8 | 288 | Punkin Williams | Running back | Memphis State |
| 12 | 8 | 316 | Jim Rockford | Defensive back | Oklahoma |
| 12 | 22 | 330 | James Melka | Linebacker | Wisconsin |

== 1986 draft ==
| Round | Pick # | Overall | Name | Position | College |
|---|---|---|---|---|---|
| 1 | 1 | 1 | Bo Jackson | Running back | Auburn |
| 1 | 25 | 25 | Rod Jones | Cornerback | SMU |
| 2 | 1 | 28 | Jackie Walker | Linebacker | Jackson State |
| 2 | 13 | 40 | Kevin Murphy | Linebacker | Oklahoma |
| 4 | 1 | 83 | Craig Swoope | Safety | Illinois |
| 5 | 2 | 112 | J. D. Maarleveld | Offensive tackle | Maryland |
| 6 | 27 | 165 | Kevin Walker | Defensive back | East Carolina |
| 9 | 2 | 223 | Tommy Barnhardt | Punter | North Carolina |
| 10 | 1 | 250 | Benton Reed | Defensive end | Ole Miss |
| 11 | 2 | 279 | Mark Drenth | Offensive tackle | Purdue |
| 12 | 1 | 306 | Clay Miller | Guard | Michigan |

== 1987 draft ==
| Round | Pick # | Overall | Name | Position | College |
|---|---|---|---|---|---|
| 1 | 1 | 1 | Vinny Testaverde | Quarterback | Miami (FL) |
| 2 | 8 | 36 | Ricky Reynolds | Cornerback | Washington State |
| 2 | 22 | 50 | Winston Moss | Linebacker | Miami (FL) |
| 2 | 23 | 51 | Don Smith | Running back | Mississippi State |
| 3 | 1 | 57 | Mark Carrier | Wide receiver | Nicholls State |
| 4 | 1 | 85 | Don Graham | Linebacker | Penn State |
| 4 | 3 | 87 | Ron Hall | Tight end | Hawaii |
| 4 | 22 | 106 | Bruce Hill | Wide receiver | Arizona State |
| 5 | 23 | 135 | Henry Rolling | Linebacker | Nevada |
| 5 | 25 | 137 | Tony Mayes | Defensive back | Kentucky |
| 6 | 3 | 143 | Steve Bartalo | Running back | Colorado State |
| 7 | 1 | 169 | Curt Jarvis | Defensive tackle | Alabama |
| 7 | 22 | 190 | Harry Swayne | Offensive tackle | Rutgers |
| 8 | 2 | 197 | Stan Mataele | Defensive tackle | Arizona |
| 9 | 1 | 224 | Joe Armentrout | Running back | Wisconsin |
| 9 | 23 | 246 | Greg Davis | Kicker | The Citadel |
| 10 | 1 | 252 | Mike Simmonds | Guard | Indiana State |
| 11 | 1 | 280 | Reggie Taylor | Running back | Cincinnati |
| 12 | 1 | 308 | Scott Cooper | Defensive tackle | Kearney State |
| 12 | 6 | 313 | Mike Shula | Quarterback | Alabama |

== 1988 draft ==
| Round | Pick # | Overall | Name | Position | College |
|---|---|---|---|---|---|
| 1 | 4 | 4 | Paul Gruber | Offensive tackle | Wisconsin |
| 2 | 26 | 53 | Lars Tate | Running back | Georgia |
| 4 | 1 | 83 | Robert Goff | Defensive end | Auburn |
| 4 | 4 | 86 | John Bruhin | Guard | Tennessee |
| 4 | 25 | 107 | Monte Robbins | Punter | Michigan |
| 5 | 4 | 113 | William Howard | Running back | Tennessee |
| 6 | 26 | 163 | Shawn Lee | Defensive tackle | North Alabama |
| 7 | 2 | 167 | Kerry Goode | Running back | Alabama |
| 8 | 5 | 198 | Anthony Simpson | Running back | East Carolina |
| 9 | 4 | 225 | Reuben Davis | Defensive end | North Carolina |
| 11 | 2 | 279 | Frank Pillow | Wide receiver | Tennessee State |
| 12 | 5 | 310 | Victor Jones | Linebacker | Virginia Tech |

== 1989 draft ==
| Round | Pick # | Overall | Name | Position | College |
|---|---|---|---|---|---|
| 1 | 6 | 6 | Broderick Thomas | Linebacker | Nebraska |
| 2 | 5 | 33 | Danny Peebles | Wide receiver | North Carolina State |
| 4 | 6 | 90 | Anthony Florence | Defensive back | Bethune-Cookman |
| 5 | 5 | 117 | Jamie Wilson | Running back | Nicholls State |
| 6 | 7 | 146 | Chris Mohr | Punter | Alabama |
| 6 | 15 | 154 | Derrick Little | Linebacker | South Carolina |
| 8 | 5 | 200 | Carl Bax | Guard | Missouri |
| 9 | 7 | 230 | Patrick Egu | Running back | Nevada |
| 10 | 6 | 257 | Ty Granger | Offensive tackle | Clemson |
| 11 | 5 | 284 | Rod Mounts | Guard | Texas A&I |
| 11 | 11 | 290 | Willie Griffin | Defensive end | Nebraska |
| 11 | 23 | 302 | Herb Duncan | Wide receiver | Northern Arizona |
| 12 | 22 | 329 | Terry Young | Defensive back | Georgia Southern |

== 1990 draft ==
| Round | Pick # | Overall | Name | Position | College |
|---|---|---|---|---|---|
| 1 | 4 | 4 | Keith McCants | Linebacker | Alabama |
| 2 | 5 | 30 | Reggie Cobb | Running back | Tennessee |
| 4 | 6 | 87 | Jesse Anderson | Tight end | Mississippi State |
| 4 | 27 | 108 | Tony Mayberry | Center | Wake Forest |
| 5 | 5 | 114 | Ian Beckles | Guard | Indiana |
| 6 | 4 | 141 | Derrick Douglas | Running back | Louisiana Tech |
| 7 | 6 | 171 | Donnie Gardner | Defensive end | Kentucky |
| 9 | 4 | 224 | Terry Cook | Defensive end | Fresno State |
| 10 | 6 | 254 | Mike Busch | Tight end | Iowa State |
| 11 | 5 | 281 | Terry Anthony | Wide receiver | Florida State |
| 12 | 3 | 307 | Todd Hammel | Quarterback | Stephen F. Austin |

== 1991 draft ==
| Round | Pick # | Overall | Name | Position | College |
|---|---|---|---|---|---|
| 1 | 7 | 7 | Charles McRae | Offensive tackle | Tennessee |
| 3 | 11 | 66 | Lawrence Dawsey | Wide receiver | Florida State |
| 3 | 25 | 80 | Robert Wilson | Running back | Texas A&M |
| 4 | 10 | 93 | Tony Covington | Safety | Virginia |
| 5 | 9 | 120 | Terry Bagsby | Linebacker | East Texas State |
| 5 | 25 | 136 | Tim Ryan | Guard | Notre Dame |
| 6 | 8 | 147 | Rhett Hall | Defensive tackle | California |
| 7 | 7 | 174 | Calvin Tiggle | Linebacker | Georgia Tech |
| 8 | 12 | 207 | Marty Carter | Safety | Middle Tennessee State |
| 9 | 10 | 233 | Treamelle Taylor | Wide receiver | Nevada |
| 10 | 10 | 260 | Pat O'Hara | Quarterback | USC |
| 10 | 15 | 265 | Hyland Hickson | Running back | Michigan State |
| 11 | 9 | 287 | Mike Sunvold | Defensive tackle | Minnesota |
| 12 | 8 | 314 | Al Chamblee | Linebacker | Virginia Tech |

== 1992 draft ==
| Round | Pick # | Overall | Name | Position | College |
|---|---|---|---|---|---|
| 2 | 16 | 44 | Courtney Hawkins | Wide receiver | Michigan State |
| 3 | 3 | 59 | Mark Wheeler | Defensive tackle | Texas A&M |
| 3 | 23 | 79 | Tyji Armstrong | Tight end | Ole Miss |
| 4 | 2 | 86 | Craig Erickson | Quarterback | Miami (FL) |
| 5 | 6 | 118 | Rogerick Green | Defensive back | Kansas State |
| 5 | 20 | 132 | Santana Dotson | Defensive tackle | Baylor |
| 6 | 8 | 148 | James Malone | Linebacker | UCLA |
| 7 | 16 | 184 | Ken Swilling | Defensive back | Georgia Tech |
| 8 | 4 | 200 | Anthony McDowell | Running back | Texas Tech |
| 8 | 26 | 222 | Mike Pawlawski | Quarterback | California |
| 10 | 2 | 254 | Elijah Alexander | Linebacker | Kansas State |
| 11 | 4 | 284 | Mazio Royster | Running back | USC |
| 12 | 3 | 311 | Klaus Wilmsmeyer | Punter | Louisville |

== 1993 draft ==
| Round | Pick # | Overall | Name | Position | College |
|---|---|---|---|---|---|
| 1 | 6 | 6 | Eric Curry | Defensive end | Alabama |
| 2 | 5 | 34 | Demetrius DuBose | Linebacker | Notre Dame |
| 3 | 4 | 60 | Lamar Thomas | Wide receiver | Miami (FL) |
| 3 | 26 | 80 | John Lynch | Safety | Stanford |
| 4 | 7 | 91 | Rudy Harris | Running back | Clemson |
| 4 | 20 | 104 | Horace Copeland | Wide receiver | Miami (FL) |
| 6 | 5 | 145 | Chidi Ahanotu | Defensive tackle | California |
| 7 | 8 | 176 | Tyree Davis | Wide receiver | Central Arkansas |
| 8 | 24 | 220 | Darrick Branch | Wide receiver | Hawaii |
| 8 | 28 | 224 | Daron Alcorn | Kicker | Akron |

== 1994 draft ==
| Round | Pick # | Overall | Name | Position | College |
|---|---|---|---|---|---|
| 1 | 6 | 6 | Trent Dilfer | Quarterback | Fresno State |
| 2 | 5 | 34 | Errict Rhett | Running back | Florida |
| 3 | 4 | 69 | Harold Bishop | Tight end | LSU |
| 5 | 5 | 136 | Pete Pierson | Offensive tackle | Washington |
| 6 | 4 | 165 | Bernard Carter | Linebacker | East Carolina |
| 7 | 6 | 200 | Jim Pyne | Center | Virginia Tech |

== 1995 draft ==
| Round | Pick # | Overall | Name | Position | College |
|---|---|---|---|---|---|
| 1 | 12 | 12 | Warren Sapp | Defensive tackle | Miami (FL) |
| 1 | 28 | 28 | Derrick Brooks | Linebacker | Florida State |
| 2 | 11 | 43 | Melvin Johnson | Safety | Kentucky |
| 4 | 7 | 105 | Jerry Wilson | Safety | Southern |
| 5 | 9 | 143 | Clifton Abraham | Defensive back | Florida State |
| 6 | 8 | 179 | Wardell Rouse | Linebacker | Clemson |
| 7 | 7 | 215 | Steve Ingram | Guard | Maryland |
| 7 | 19 | 227 | Jeffrey Rodgers | Defensive end | Texas A&M-Kingsville |

== 1996 draft ==
| Round | Pick # | Overall | Name | Position | College |
|---|---|---|---|---|---|
| 1 | 12 | 12 | Regan Upshaw | Defensive end | California |
| 1 | 22 | 22 | Marcus Jones | Defensive tackle | North Carolina |
| 2 | 5 | 35 | Mike Alstott | Fullback | Purdue |
| 3 | 10 | 71 | Donnie Abraham | Cornerback | East Tennessee State |
| 4 | 1 | 96 | Jason Odom | Offensive tackle | Florida |
| 4 | 9 | 104 | Eric Austin | Defensive back | Jackson State |
| 5 | 8 | 140 | Jason Maniecki | Defensive tackle | Wisconsin |
| 6 | 13 | 180 | Nilo Silvan | Wide receiver | Tennessee |
| 7 | 12 | 221 | Reggie Rusk | Cornerback | Kentucky |

== 1997 draft ==
| Round | Pick # | Overall | Name | Position | College |
|---|---|---|---|---|---|
| 1 | 12 | 12 | Warrick Dunn | Running back | Florida State |
| 1 | 16 | 16 | Reidel Anthony | Wide receiver | Florida |
| 2 | 7 | 37 | Jerry Wunsch | Offensive tackle | Wisconsin |
| 3 | 3 | 63 | Frank Middleton | Guard | Arizona |
| 3 | 6 | 66 | Ronde Barber | Cornerback | Virginia |
| 4 | 32 | 128 | Alshermond Singleton | Linebacker | Temple |
| 5 | 7 | 137 | Patrick Hape | Tight end | Alabama |
| 6 | 6 | 169 | Al Harris | Cornerback | Texas A&M-Kingsville |
| 6 | 34 | 197 | Nigea Carter | Wide receiver | Michigan State |
| 7 | 8 | 209 | Anthony DeGrate | Defensive tackle | Stephen F. Austin |

== 1998 draft ==
| Round | Pick # | Overall | Name | Position | College |
|---|---|---|---|---|---|
| 2 | 4 | 34 | Jacquez Green | Wide receiver | Florida |
| 2 | 15 | 45 | Brian Kelly | Cornerback | USC |
| 3 | 23 | 84 | Jamie Duncan | Linebacker | Vanderbilt |
| 4 | 12 | 104 | Todd Washington | Center | Virginia Tech |
| 6 | 22 | 175 | James Cannida | Defensive tackle | Nevada |
| 6 | 31 | 184 | Shevin Smith | Safety | Florida State |
| 7 | 23 | 212 | Chance McCarty | Defensive end | TCU |

== 1999 draft ==
| Round | Pick # | Overall | Name | Position | College |
|---|---|---|---|---|---|
| 1 | 15 | 15 | Anthony McFarland | Defensive tackle | LSU |
| 2 | 19 | 50 | Shaun King | Quarterback | Tulane |
| 3 | 19 | 80 | Martín Gramática | Kicker | Kansas State |
| 4 | 18 | 113 | Dexter Jackson | Safety | Florida State |
| 5 | 16 | 150 | John McLaughlin | Defensive end | California |
| 6 | 26 | 195 | Lamarr Glenn | Fullback | Florida State |
| 7 | 20 | 226 | Robert Hunt | Guard | Virginia |
| 7 | 27 | 233 | Autry Denson | Running back | Notre Dame |
| 7 | 34 | 240 | Darnell McDonald | Wide receiver | Kansas State |

== 2000 draft ==
| Round | Pick # | Overall | Name | Position | College |
|---|---|---|---|---|---|
| 2 | 20 | 51 | Cosey Coleman | Guard | Tennessee |
| 3 | 28 | 90 | Nate Webster | Linebacker | Miami (FL) |
| 5 | 28 | 157 | James Whalen | Tight end | Kentucky |
| 6 | 27 | 193 | David Gibson | Safety | USC |
| 7 | 28 | 234 | Joe Hamilton | Quarterback | Georgia Tech |

== 2001 draft ==
| Round | Pick # | Overall | Name | Position | College |
|---|---|---|---|---|---|
| 1 | 14 | 14 | Kenyatta Walker | Offensive tackle | Florida |
| 3 | 22 | 84 | Dwight Smith | Safety | Akron |
| 4 | 22 | 117 | John Howell | Safety | Colorado State |
| 5 | 20 | 151 | Russ Hochstein | Guard | Nebraska |
| 6 | 11 | 174 | Jameel Cook | Fullback | Illinois |
| 6 | 20 | 183 | Ellis Wyms | Defensive tackle | Mississippi State |
| 7 | 5 | 205 | Dauntae' Finger | Tight end | North Carolina |
| 7 | 23 | 223 | Than Merrill | Safety | Yale |
| 7 | 34 | 234 | Joe Tafoya | Defensive end | Arizona |

== 2002 draft ==
| Round | Pick # | Overall | Name | Position | College |
|---|---|---|---|---|---|
| 3 | 21 | 86 | Marquise Walker | Wide receiver | Michigan |
| 4 | 21 | 119 | Travis Stephens | Running back | Tennessee |
| 5 | 22 | 157 | Jermaine Phillips | Safety | Georgia |
| 6 | 21 | 193 | John Stamper | Defensive end | South Carolina |
| 7 | 22 | 233 | Tim Wansley | Cornerback | Georgia |
| 7 | 40 | 250 | Tracey Wistrom | Tight end | Nebraska |
| 7 | 43 | 254 | Aaron Lockett | Wide receiver | Kansas State |
| 7 | 44 | 255 | Zack Quaccia | Center | Stanford |

== 2003 draft ==
| Round | Pick # | Overall | Name | Position | College |
|---|---|---|---|---|---|
| 2 | 32 | 64 | Dewayne White | Defensive end | Louisville |
| 3 | 33 | 97 | Chris Simms | Quarterback | Texas |
| 4 | 33 | 130 | Lance Nimmo | Offensive tackle | West Virginia |
| 4 | 36 | 133 | Austin King | Center | Northwestern |
| 5 | 33 | 168 | Sean Mahan | Guard | Notre Dame |
| 6 | 32 | 205 | Torrie Cox | Cornerback | Pittsburgh |

== 2004 draft ==
| Round | Pick # | Overall | Name | Position | College |
|---|---|---|---|---|---|
| 1 | 15 | 15 | Michael Clayton | Wide receiver | LSU |
| 3 | 16 | 79 | Marquis Cooper | Linebacker | Washington |
| 4 | 15 | 111 | Will Allen | Safety | Ohio State |
| 5 | 14 | 146 | Jeb Terry | Guard | North Carolina |
| 6 | 16 | 181 | Nate Lawrie | Tight end | Yale |
| 7 | 5 | 206 | Mark Jones | Wide receiver | Tennessee |
| 7 | 27 | 228 | Casey Cramer | Fullback | Dartmouth |
| 7 | 51 | 252 | Lenny Williams | Defensive back | Southern |

== 2005 draft ==
| Round | Pick # | Overall | Name | Position | College |
|---|---|---|---|---|---|
| 1 | 5 | 5 | Carnell Williams | Running back | Auburn |
| 2 | 4 | 36 | Barrett Ruud | Linebacker | Nebraska |
| 3 | 7 | 71 | Alex Smith | Tight end | Stanford |
| 3 | 27 | 91 | Chris Colmer | Offensive tackle | North Carolina State |
| 4 | 6 | 107 | Dan Buenning | Guard | Wisconsin |
| 5 | 5 | 141 | Donte Nicholson | Safety | Oklahoma |
| 5 | 19 | 155 | Larry Brackins | Wide receiver | Pearl River Community College |
| 6 | 4 | 178 | Anthony Bryant | Defensive tackle | Alabama |
| 7 | 7 | 221 | Rick Razzano | Fullback | Ole Miss |
| 7 | 11 | 225 | Paris Warren | Wide receiver | Utah |
| 7 | 17 | 231 | Hamza Abdullah | Safety | Washington State |
| 7 | 39 | 253 | J. R. Russell | Wide receiver | Louisville |

== 2006 draft ==
| Round | Pick # | Overall | Name | Position | College |
|---|---|---|---|---|---|
| 1 | 23 | 23 | Davin Joseph | Guard | Oklahoma |
| 2 | 27 | 59 | Jeremy Trueblood | Offensive tackle | Boston College |
| 3 | 26 | 90 | Maurice Stovall | Wide receiver | Notre Dame |
| 4 | 25 | 122 | Alan Zemaitis | Cornerback | Penn State |
| 5 | 24 | 156 | Julian Jenkins | Defensive end | Stanford |
| 6 | 25 | 194 | Bruce Gradkowski | Quarterback | Toledo |
| 6 | 33 | 202 | T. J. Williams | Tight end | North Carolina State |
| 7 | 27 | 235 | Justin Phinisee | Cornerback | Oregon |
| 7 | 33 | 241 | Charles Bennett | Defensive end | Clemson |
| 7 | 36 | 244 | Tim Massaquoi | Tight end | Michigan |

== 2007 draft ==
| Round | Pick # | Overall | Name | Position | College |
|---|---|---|---|---|---|
| 1 | 4 | 4 | Gaines Adams | Defensive end | Clemson |
| 2 | 3 | 35 | Arron Sears | Guard | Tennessee |
| 2 | 32 | 64 | Sabby Piscitelli | Safety | Oregon State |
| 3 | 4 | 68 | Quincy Black | Linebacker | New Mexico |
| 4 | 7 | 106 | Tanard Jackson | Safety | Syracuse |
| 5 | 4 | 141 | Greg Peterson | Defensive tackle | North Carolina Central |
| 6 | 8 | 182 | Adam Hayward | Linebacker | Portland State |
| 7 | 4 | 214 | Chris Denman | Offensive tackle | Fresno State |
| 7 | 35 | 245 | Marcus Hamilton | Cornerback | Virginia |
| 7 | 36 | 246 | Kenneth Darby | Running back | Alabama |

== 2008 draft ==
| Round | Pick # | Overall | Name | Position | College |
|---|---|---|---|---|---|
| 1 | 20 | 20 | Aqib Talib | Cornerback | Kansas |
| 2 | 27 | 58 | Dexter Jackson | Wide receiver | Appalachian State |
| 3 | 20 | 83 | Jeremy Zuttah | Guard | Rutgers |
| 4 | 16 | 115 | Dre Moore | Defensive tackle | Maryland |
| 5 | 25 | 160 | Josh Johnson | Quarterback | San Diego |
| 6 | 8 | 217 | Geno Hayes | Linebacker | Florida State |
| 7 | 31 | 238 | Cory Boyd | Running back | South Carolina |

== 2009 draft ==
| Round | Pick # | Overall | Name | Position | College |
|---|---|---|---|---|---|
| 1 | 17 | 17 | Josh Freeman | Quarterback | Kansas State |
| 3 | 17 | 81 | Roy Miller | Defensive tackle | Texas |
| 4 | 17 | 117 | Kyle Moore | Defensive end | USC |
| 5 | 19 | 155 | Xavier Fulton | Offensive tackle | Illinois |
| 7 | 8 | 217 | E. J. Biggers | Cornerback | Western Michigan |
| 7 | 24 | 233 | Sammie Stroughter | Wide receiver | Oregon State |

== 2010 draft ==
| Round | Pick # | Overall | Name | Position | College |
|---|---|---|---|---|---|
| 1 | 3 | 3 | Gerald McCoy | Defensive tackle | Oklahoma |
| 2 | 3 | 35 | Brian Price | Defensive tackle | UCLA |
| 2 | 7 | 39 | Arrelious Benn | Wide receiver | Illinois |
| 3 | 3 | 67 | Myron Lewis | Cornerback | Vanderbilt |
| 4 | 3 | 101 | Mike Williams | Wide receiver | Syracuse |
| 6 | 3 | 172 | Brent Bowden | Punter | Virginia Tech |
| 7 | 3 | 210 | Cody Grimm | Safety | Virginia Tech |
| 7 | 10 | 217 | Dekoda Watson | Linebacker | Florida State |
| 7 | 46 | 253 | Erik Lorig | Defensive end | Stanford |

== 2011 draft ==
| Round | Pick # | Overall | Name | Position | College |
|---|---|---|---|---|---|
| 1 | 20 | 20 | Adrian Clayborn | Defensive end | Iowa |
| 2 | 19 | 51 | Da'Quan Bowers | Defensive end | Clemson |
| 3 | 20 | 84 | Mason Foster | Linebacker | Washington |
| 4 | 7 | 104 | Luke Stocker | Tight end | Tennessee |
| 5 | 20 | 151 | Ahmad Black | Safety | Florida |
| 6 | 22 | 187 | Allen Bradford | Running back | USC |
| 7 | 19 | 222 | Anthony Gaitor | Cornerback | Florida International |
| 7 | 35 | 238 | Daniel Hardy | Tight end | Idaho |

== 2012 draft ==
| Round | Pick # | Overall | Name | Position | College |
|---|---|---|---|---|---|
| 1 | 7 | 7 | Mark Barron | Safety | Alabama |
| 1 | 31 | 31 | Doug Martin | Running back | Boise State |
| 2 | 26 | 58 | Lavonte David | Linebacker | Nebraska |
| 5 | 5 | 140 | Najee Goode | Linebacker | West Virginia |
| 6 | 4 | 174 | Keith Tandy | Cornerback | West Virginia |
| 7 | 5 | 212 | Michael Smith | Running back | Utah State |
| 7 | 26 | 233 | Drake Dunsmore | Tight end | Northwestern |

== 2013 draft ==
| Round | Pick # | Overall | Name | Position | College |
|---|---|---|---|---|---|
| 2 | 11 | 43 | Johnthan Banks | Cornerback | Mississippi State |
| 3 | 11 | 73 | Mike Glennon | Quarterback | North Carolina State |
| 4 | 3 | 100 | Akeem Spence | Defensive tackle | Illinois |
| 4 | 29 | 126 | William Gholston | Defensive end | Michigan State |
| 5 | 14 | 147 | Steven Means | Defensive end | Buffalo |
| 6 | 21 | 189 | Mike James | Running back | Miami |

== 2014 draft ==
| Round | Pick # | Overall | Name | Position | College |
|---|---|---|---|---|---|
| 1 | 7 | 7 | Mike Evans | Wide receiver | Texas A&M |
| 2 | 6 | 38 | Austin Seferian-Jenkins | Tight end | Washington |
| 3 | 5 | 69 | Charles Sims | Running back | West Virginia |
| 5 | 3 | 143 | Kadeem Edwards | Guard | Tennessee State |
| 5 | 9 | 149 | Kevin Pamphile | Offensive tackle | Purdue |
| 6 | 9 | 185 | Robert Herron | Wide receiver | Wyoming |

== 2015 draft ==
| Round | Pick # | Overall | Name | Position | College |
|---|---|---|---|---|---|
| 1 | 1 | 1 | Jameis Winston | Quarterback | Florida State |
| 2 | 2 | 34 | Donovan Smith | Offensive tackle | Penn State |
| 2 | 29 | 61 | Ali Marpet | Center | Hobart and William Smith Colleges |
| 4 | 25 | 125 | Kwon Alexander | Linebacker | LSU |
| 5 | 26 | 162 | Kenny Bell | Wide receiver | Nebraska |
| 6 | 8 | 184 | Kaelin Clay | Wide receiver | Utah |
| 7 | 14 | 231 | Joey Iosefa | Fullback | Hawaii |

== 2016 draft ==
| Round | Pick # | Overall | Name | Position | College |
|---|---|---|---|---|---|
| 1 | 11 | 11 | Vernon Hargreaves | Cornerback | Florida |
| 2 | 8 | 39 | Noah Spence | Defensive end | Eastern Kentucky |
| 2 | 28 | 59 | Roberto Aguayo | Placekicker | Florida State |
| 4 | 10 | 108 | Ryan Smith | Cornerback | North Carolina Central |
| 5 | 9 | 148 | Caleb Benenoch | Guard | UCLA |
| 6 | 8 | 183 | Devante Bond | Linebacker | Oklahoma |
| 6 | 22 | 197 | Dan Vitale | Fullback | Northwestern |

== 2017 draft ==
| Round | Pick # | Overall | Name | Position | College |
|---|---|---|---|---|---|
| 1 | 19 | 19 | O. J. Howard | Tight end | Alabama |
| 2 | 18 | 50 | Justin Evans | Safety | Texas A&M |
| 3 | 20 | 84 | Chris Godwin | Wide receiver | Penn State |
| 3 | 43 | 107 | Kendell Beckwith | Linebacker | LSU |
| 5 | 18 | 162 | Jeremy McNichols | Running back | Boise State |
| 7 | 5 | 223 | Stevie Tu'ikolovatu | Defensive tackle | USC |

== 2018 draft ==
| Round | Pick # | Overall | Name | Position | College |
|---|---|---|---|---|---|
| 1 | 12 | 12 | Vita Vea | Defensive tackle | Washington |
| 2 | 6 | 38 | Ronald Jones II | Running back | USC |
| 2 | 21 | 53 | M. J. Stewart | Cornerback | North Carolina |
| 2 | 31 | 63 | Carlton Davis | Cornerback | Auburn |
| 3 | 30 | 94 | Alex Cappa | Guard | Humboldt State |
| 4 | 17 | 117 | Jordan Whitehead | Safety | Pittsburgh |
| 5 | 7 | 144 | Justin Watson | Wide receiver | Penn |
| 6 | 28 | 202 | Jack Cichy | Linebacker | Wisconsin |

== 2019 draft ==
| Round | Pick # | Overall | Name | Position | College |
|---|---|---|---|---|---|
| 1 | 5 | 5 | Devin White | Linebacker | LSU |
| 2 | 7 | 39 | Sean Murphy-Bunting | Cornerback | Central Michigan |
| 3 | 31 | 94 | Jamel Dean | Cornerback | Auburn |
| 3 | 36 | 99 | Mike Edwards | Safety | Kentucky |
| 4 | 5 | 107 | Anthony Nelson | Defensive end | Iowa |
| 5 | 7 | 145 | Matt Gay | Kicker | Utah |
| 6 | 36 | 208 | Scott Miller | Wide receiver | Bowling Green |
| 7 | 1 | 215 | Terry Beckner | Defensive tackle | Missouri |

== 2020 draft ==
| Round | Pick # | Overall | Name | Position | College |
|---|---|---|---|---|---|
| 1 | 13 | 13 | Tristan Wirfs | Offensive tackle | Iowa |
| 2 | 13 | 45 | Antoine Winfield Jr. | Safety | Minnesota |
| 3 | 12 | 76 | Ke'Shawn Vaughn | Running back | Vanderbilt |
| 5 | 16 | 161 | Tyler Johnson | Wide receiver | Minnesota |
| 6 | 15 | 194 | Khalil Davis | Defensive tackle | Nebraska |
| 7 | 27 | 241 | Chapelle Russell | Linebacker | Temple |
| 7 | 31 | 245 | Raymond Calais | Running back | Louisiana |

== 2021 draft ==
| Round | Pick # | Overall | Name | Position | College |
|---|---|---|---|---|---|
| 1 | 32 | 32 | Joe Tryon-Shoyinka | Linebacker | Washington |
| 2 | 32 | 64 | Kyle Trask | Quarterback | Florida |
| 3 | 32 | 95 | Robert Hainsey | Offensive tackle | Notre Dame |
| 4 | 24 | 129 | Jaelon Darden | Wide receiver | North Texas |
| 5 | 32 | 176 | K. J. Britt | Linebacker | Auburn |
| 7 | 24 | 251 | Chris Wilcox | Cornerback | BYU |
| 7 | 32 | 259 | Grant Stuard | Linebacker | Houston |

== 2022 draft ==
| Round | Pick # | Overall | Name | Position | College |
|---|---|---|---|---|---|
| 2 | 1 | 33 | Logan Hall | Defensive tackle | Houston |
| 2 | 25 | 57 | Luke Goedeke | Offensive tackle | Central Michigan |
| 3 | 27 | 91 | Rachaad White | Running back | Arizona State |
| 4 | 1 | 106 | Cade Otton | Tight end | Washington |
| 4 | 28 | 133 | Jake Camarda | Punter | Georgia |
| 5 | 14 | 157 | Zyon McCollum | Cornerback | Sam Houston State |
| 6 | 40 | 218 | Ko Kieft | Tight end | Minnesota |
| 7 | 27 | 248 | Andre Anthony | Linebacker | LSU |

== 2023 draft ==
| Round | Pick # | Overall | Name | Position | College |
|---|---|---|---|---|---|
| 1 | 19 | 19 | Calijah Kancey | Defensive tackle | Pittsburgh |
| 2 | 17 | 48 | Cody Mauch | Offensive tackle | North Dakota State |
| 3 | 19 | 82 | YaYa Diaby | Defensive end | Louisville |
| 5 | 18 | 153 | SirVocea Dennis | Linebacker | Pittsburgh |
| 5 | 36 | 171 | Payne Durham | Tight end | Purdue |
| 6 | 4 | 181 | Josh Hayes | Cornerback | Kansas State |
| 6 | 14 | 191 | Trey Palmer | Wide receiver | Nebraska |
| 6 | 19 | 196 | Jose Ramirez | Defensive end | Eastern Michigan |

== 2024 draft ==
| Round | Pick # | Overall | Name | Position | College |
|---|---|---|---|---|---|
| 1 | 26 | 26 | Graham Barton | Center | Duke |
| 2 | 25 | 57 | Chris Braswell | Defensive end | Alabama |
| 3 | 26 | 89 | Tykee Smith | Safety | Georgia |
| 3 | 29 | 92 | Jalen McMillan | Wide receiver | Washington |
| 4 | 25 | 125 | Bucky Irving | Running back | Oregon |
| 6 | 44 | 220 | Elijah Klein | Guard | UTEP |
| 7 | 26 | 246 | Devin Culp | Tight end | Washington |

== 2025 draft ==
| Round | Pick # | Overall | Name | Position | College |
|---|---|---|---|---|---|
| 1 | 19 | 19 | Emeka Egbuka | Wide receiver | Ohio State |
| 2 | 21 | 53 | Benjamin Morrison | Cornerback | Notre Dame |
| 3 | 20 | 84 | Jacob Parrish | Cornerback | Kansas State |
| 4 | 19 | 121 | David Walker | Defensive end | Central Arkansas |
| 5 | 21 | 157 | Elijah Roberts | Defensive end | SMU |
| 7 | 19 | 235 | Tez Johnson | Wide receiver | Oregon |

== 2026 draft ==
| Round | Pick # | Overall | Name | Position | College |
|---|---|---|---|---|---|
| 1 | 15 | 15 | Rueben Bain Jr. | Defensive end | Miami |
| 2 | 14 | 46 | Josiah Trotter | Linebacker | Missouri |
| 3 | 20 | 84 | Ted Hurst | Wide receiver | Georgia State |
| 4 | 16 | 116 | Keionte Scott | Cornerback | Miami |
| 5 | 15 | 155 | DeMonte Capehart | Defensive tackle | Clemson |
| 5 | 20 | 160 | Billy Schrauth | Guard | Notre Dame |
| 6 | 4 | 185 | Bauer Sharp | Tight end | LSU |

== See also ==
- History of the Tampa Bay Buccaneers
- List of professional American football drafts
- List of Tampa Bay Buccaneers first-round draft picks
