= 1982 Tampa Bay Buccaneers season =

NFL team season

- Owner: Hugh Culverhouse
- Head coach: John McKay
- Defensive coordinator: Wayne Fontes
- Home stadium: Tampa Stadium

Results
- Record: 5–4
- Division place: 7th NFC (3rd NFC Central)
- Playoffs: Lost Wild Card Playoffs (at Cowboys) 17–30
- All-Pros: 3: SS Neal Colzie (2nd-team); LB Hugh Green (2nd-team); DE Lee Roy Selmon (2nd-team)
- Pro Bowlers: 3: TE Jimmie Giles; LB Hugh Green; DE Lee Roy Selmon
- Team MVP: SS Neal Colzie

The 1982 Tampa Bay Buccaneers season was the franchise's 7th season in the National Football League the 7th playing their home games at Tampa Stadium and the 7th under head coach John McKay. The Bucs were regarded for the first time as a regular playoff contender. They were considered by some to be the best Buccaneer team yet, despite a mediocre offensive line and the lack of a feature running back. The team played only two games before the players' union called a labor strike, which resulted in a nine-game season. The season began with a three-game losing streak, as the Buccaneers outplayed their opponent statistically in each game, but showed a tendency for mental errors at crucial moments. The first game in which they were outgained by their opponent was their first win, a franchise-first victory over the Miami Dolphins on Monday Night Football. The team made a playoff run against a difficult schedule, facing only two opponents with losing records. Their schedule included all four eventual Conference Championship participants. They overcame double-digit deficits to win on last-minute field goals in their final two games (kicker Bill Capece was the NFC's second-leading scorer), and had to survive opponents' last-minute rallies in all five of their victories. In the strike-season playoff format in which the top eight conference teams made the playoffs, the Buccaneers' seventh-place finish gave them a first-round matchup with the Dallas Cowboys. Despite a poor performance by the offense, the Buccaneers carried a 17–16 lead into the fourth quarter, before the Cowboys rallied for a 30–17 victory following a controversial penalty call. This was the last playoff appearance of the John McKay era, and was followed by fourteen consecutive losing seasons.

The year began with longtime defensive coordinator Tom Bass and several players leaving for San Diego. Observers questioned why Bass, who had built the defenses that had ranked at or near the top of the league statistically over the last several years, left; and further, why so many of the team's top players and former MVPs had been traded away. The team unveiled a new, Wayne Fontes-designed defensive philosophy, featuring tighter coverage to reduce the number of small gains, and increased blitzing to thwart opponents' practice of double-teaming Lee Roy Selmon. The team continued to be regarded as having one of the quickest, hardest-hitting defenses in the NFL, a defense which ranked first in the NFC. In the later part of the season, the offense began to jell, taking a part in the victories more equal to that which the defense played. In particular, the line allowed the fewest sacks in the league, while providing an improved running game. The offense as a whole developed an ability to rally from deficits. However, they continued to be criticized as overly conservative, as they scored just 9 first-quarter points in their 10 games, and opened up their passing attack only when behind late in games. This became an issue in the playoff loss to Dallas, where Doug Williams was unable to recover from a bad start. Following the season, the Buccaneers were represented by Jimmie Giles, Hugh Green, and Lee Roy Selmon in the Pro Bowl.

== Offseason ==
An unusually active offseason saw defensive coordinator Tom Bass and several players leaving to join the San Diego Chargers. Potentially embarrassing off-field incidents were avoided when sexual assault charges against guard Greg Roberts were dropped, while an indecent exposure charge against receiver Theo Bell was dropped when the act turned out to have been committed by an imposter who merely claimed to have been Bell. Bell later filed a libel suit against the Associated Press over their reporting of the incident. With the NFLPA contract about to expire, union officials became angered over the lack of progress in March meetings, and continued to raise the prospect of a strike. Other offseason distractions included Hugh Green's arrest for evading police after being pulled over for a speeding ticket, and contract holdouts by Richard Wood and Jimmie Giles. Giles, who threatened retirement, received a verbal commitment to get a contract renegotiation at a later date. Wood reported to camp angry and with no guarantee that his contract would be extended beyond 1984. The team negotiated an agreement with the Tampa Sports Authority that guaranteed their residence in Tampa Stadium through 1995.

=== Coaching changes ===
Bill Muir, director of pro scouting, left to become the offensive line coach of the New England Patriots. University of Tennessee defensive line coach and original Miami Dolphin Frank Emanuel was hired, charged with the task of improving the kicking teams that occasionally lost games for the Buccaneers. Tom Bass, considered to be the chief architect of the Buccaneer defense, accepted the San Diego Chargers' defensive coordinator position that had recently been vacated by Jack Pardee. Bass' duties were taken over by defensive backfield coach Wayne Fontes, who had turned down a similar offer from the Los Angeles Rams. Fontes was noted for having built a league-leading secondary out of players obtained from trades and waivers. It was alleged that McKay disagreed with Bass over certain defensive philosophies, and so encouraged Fontes to remain with Tampa Bay, with the intent of giving him Bass' job. This was the first major defensive coaching change since the franchise's inception. Former Notre Dame assistant Jim Gruden was brought in as running backs coach, displacing George Chaump, who turned down an offer to remain in the organization in a different position. Chaump later accepted a head coaching position at Indiana University of Pennsylvania. Longtime equipment manager Pat Marcuccillo unexpectedly resigned during the season, for unknown reasons that were revealed a week later, when he was arrested for selling $21,000 worth of stolen game jerseys.

=== Player trades ===
Dave Lewis, demoted the previous season due to assorted off-field problems, was traded to the Chargers for two draft picks, the Chargers' 1984 fourth-round and 1982 third-round selections. The latter was the last pick in the round, having originally belonged to the San Francisco 49ers. Ricky Bell, the Buccaneers' all-time leading rusher, and Dewey Selmon, their former All-Pro linebacker, joined him shortly afterward, both traded for draft picks. Bell played only two games for the Chargers before being diagnosed with the dermatomyositis that led to his death from cardiac arrest two years later. The undisclosed off-field problems that led to Lewis' trade allegedly involved an argument over a suspension, which McKay interpreted as a challenge to his authority. Years later, McKay and team owner Hugh Culverhouse confirmed rumors that the trades were connected to drug use that was partially responsible for the team's disappointing 1980 performance. Selmon's status as the team's union representative led to criticism from the National Football League Players Association, who said that he should not have been traded during contract negotiations, although Selmon himself approved the trade. The issue increased the difficulty in negotiations for a new bargaining agreement, as the union pointed to this and a rumored trade of alternate representative Mark Cotney as examples of teams harassing representatives. Dewey's brother Lee Roy was elected to take his place as player representative. Tackle Dave Reavis, a member of the 1976 expansion squad, became the first active player to retire as a Buccaneer, although he was reinstated and rejoined the team later in the season.

=== NFL draft ===
Round	Pick	Player	Position	School
1	17	Sean Farrell	Guard	Penn State
2	32 (from Chicago)	Booker Reese	Defensive end	Bethune–Cookman
3	74	Jerry Bell	Tight end	Arizona State
3	83 (from San Diego)	John Cannon	Defensive end	William and Mary
4	103 (from San Diego)	Dave Barrett	Running back	Houston
5	128	Jeff Davis	Linebacker	Clemson
6	158	Andre Tyler	Wide receiver	Stanford
7	185	Tom Morris	Defensive back	Michigan State
8	212	Kelvin Atkins	Linebacker	Illinois
9	242	Bob Lane	Quarterback	Northeast Louisiana
12	325	Michael Morton	Running back	UNLV

==== Draft trades ====
The 2nd-round pick was obtained from the Chicago Bears in exchange for the Bears' 1983 1st-round pick. The Buccaneers' original 2nd-round pick had been traded to the Miami Dolphins as part of a trade for cornerback Norris Thomas. Their 4th-round pick and their second pick in the 3rd round came from the San Diego Chargers, in trades for RB Ricky Bell and LB David Lewis. The Buccaneers' original 4th-round pick had earlier been traded to the Dallas Cowboys for DE Dave Stalls.

==== Draft selections ====
The previous year's playoff loss to Dallas drew attention to the team's historical lack of a dominating offensive line, making that position a draft priority. Penn State All-America guard Sean Farrell was not expected to last until the Buccaneers' selection at number 18, leaving UCLA tackle Luis Sharpe and USC guard Roy Foster as leading candidates. Despite their wealth of linebacking talent, USC linebacker Chip Banks was also under consideration, given the likelihood that he would be the best player available. As it turned out, Farrell advised several teams not to select him, including the St. Louis Cardinals, who drafted ahead of the Buccaneers and selected Sharpe. This left Farrell available for the Buccaneers, who drafted him with plans to play him in Ray Snell's spot and move Snell to left tackle.

Farrell was labeled as a "can't-miss" prospect, but the Buccaneer draft was otherwise marked by a pronounced tendency to gamble. This was evidenced in personnel director Ken Herock's comments that previous Buccaneer staffs did not have the confidence to make the selections they did. Second-round pick Booker Reese had ideal physical characteristics for a pass-rushing defensive end, but had to make the difficult jump from Division I-AA to professional football. Several of the selections had injury histories, notably receiver Andre Tyler, who was believed to be a better player than his Stanford teammate, Chicago Bears receiver Ken Margerum, but did not play at all in 1981. Chronic knee injuries prevented quarterback Bob Lane from ever having become a starter in college. Defensive end John Cannon missed half of his senior season with knee injuries. Jeff Davis and Michael Morton were considered undersized, and Jerry Bell had little experience. Bell was also criticized for being lazy and playing below his potential, although this turned out to be something that Arizona State coach Frank Kush said of many players. Cannon was selected for the tenacity he displayed while playing through injuries, while Morton was selected as a return man. David Barrett was believed to be a better runner than previous Buccaneer fullback Johnny Davis.

Mainly on the basis of the first two picks, McKay stated that the draft was the best in team history. He felt that Davis, a hard hitter who at six feet was considered too short by many teams, was possibly the best player the team had yet obtained in the fifth round, and that seventh-rounder Thomas Morris had the speed to succeed as an NFL cornerback. The team followed the draft by signing several free-agents, including quarterback Jerry Golsteyn.

==== The Sean Farrell draft gaffe ====
Shortly after the draft, rumors began to fly that the Buccaneers had drafted Sean Farrell by mistake. Deliberating between selecting Farrell and Bethune–Cookman defensive end Booker Reese, Buccaneer staff believed that negotiations with Farrell's agents would be difficult, and decided to pick Reese. Equipment manager Pat Marcuccillo, representing the team in New York, failed to get the message to draft Reese due to a faulty speakerphone, and instead turned in the card with Farrell's name on it. The team denied the story when it was reported in the Boston Globe the following week, instead saying that they expected Reese to be the best player available when they drafted, and that Farrell's surprise availability caused them to reevaluate their plans. According to the team, the confusion of this reevaluation, combined with the consideration of a trade offer from the Buffalo Bills and the faulty phone, caused Marcuccillo to submit Farrell's name prematurely, but that Farrell was their intended selection. The Buccaneers were so enamored of Reese that they traded their 1983 first-round pick for the Chicago Bears' 1982 2nd-round pick to be able to select him, despite a league-wide expectation that the 1983 draft class was superior to that of 1982. Negotiations with Farrell proved not to be difficult, although the deal was not finalized until five minutes before the deadline to sign players before the expiration of the union contract. Farrell wound up starting 59 games over 5 years with Tampa Bay. Reese started only 7 games in three seasons. After a 1984 arrest, he was sent to the Los Angeles Rams for a 12th-round draft pick. The Bears used the Buccaneers' pick to select star receiver Willie Gault.

== Preseason ==
The preseason opened with the uncertainty of whether an NFL regular season would be held, as the players union and the team owners were having trouble renegotiating the expired union contract. The union was threatening a strike, while the owners were threatening a lockout. The union began to negotiate with cable television networks, investigating the possibility of holding their own games should a lockout occur. Players demanded a 55% share of gross team profits. They felt that they were not getting a fair share of NFL income, based on the facts that NFL salaries were lower than in other sports, while the NFL had the highest TV revenue of all sports. Team officials reported no slowdown of ticket sales, despite the likelihood of a strike and the lack of a league refund policy.

The on-field preseason action began with Randy Crowder, in his first workout since a 1980 knee injury, suffering a tear of his Achilles tendon that required surgery and meant that he missed a season for the fourth time in his nine years in the NFL. The loss of Crowder was a blow to the team's plans of using more four-man fronts for added pass rush. Mike Washington, on the other hand, was able to make a successful recovery from offseason surgery that left him with only a 50% chance of ever playing again. Mark Cotney returned, having recovered from the knee injury that caused him to miss the 1981 season. Jerry Eckwood was diagnosed with a damaged spinal disc that required season-ending surgery. Former Green Bay Packers 1000-yard rusher Terdell Middleton was signed shortly afterward.

The emergence of the United States Football League prompted the NFL to expand each roster by four players to 49. Playing rosters remained at 45, with four players each week to be placed on an inactive taxi squad. The competition marked a change in the team's philosophy, in that they no longer regarded themselves as an expansion team, and were now willing to consider veteran players who could immediately help the team, rather than choosing strictly on perceived potential. Bill Kollar's slow recovery from his knee injury of the previous season opened up competition at left defensive end, with Dave Stalls performing well, and Booker Reese slow to learn Tampa Bay's system. A similar level of competition existed at linebacker, with Scot Brantley playing well enough to replace Richard Wood in the lineup, and rookie Jeff Davis in contention for a starting spot. Andy Hawkins survived a challenge from Dana Nafziger when, temporarily inserted into the lineup due to Hawkins' ankle injury, Nafziger wound up leading the team in sacks. The preseason ended with a 34–0 domination of the Atlanta Falcons that left observers with high expectations for the regular season, although coach McKay expressed concern over what he termed a "lackluster" practice on the Monday of final roster cuts, warning that others could be cut to make room for a signee from the waiver wire. There were 14 new players on the final roster, including nine of the team's eleven draft picks, with the major portion of the turnover occurring at running back and on the defensive line. This development contradicted McKay's statements following the previous season's postseason loss to Dallas, in which McKay expressed confidence in his existing lineup.

== Regular season ==
McKay, known for accurate preseason predictions, stated that recent mediocrity in the NFC Central meant that recent high draft positions raised the level of competition to the extent that eight or nine wins would no longer be enough to contend for a division title. He predicted that the Buccaneers required 11 wins to defend their title, and that they would be able to. Changes were made to their defensive philosophy, with the linebackers lining up four yards deep instead of two, giving them more time to react on running plays. They were also given more responsibilities in short zone coverage, an adjustment intended to prevent the sustained drives that opponents had been successful with in the past. The 3-4 defense was deemphasized and more emphasis was placed on blitzing, especially from Hugh Green. Despite a strong preseason performance, the Buccaneers started the regular season with two mistake-filled losses.

=== The 1982 players' strike ===
Buccaneer players rejected a one-year contract proposal from team owners that would offer each player a bonus of up to $60,000. Assistant player representative Dave Stalls stated that management was trying to test the strength of an unproven union, and that the bonus amounted to "a bribe not to cross the picket line". The team voted on September 20 to accept the NFLPA executive council's recommendation to go on strike. Only three Buccaneers, of whom Doug Williams was the only one identified, voted against the strike. As team management made no effort to keep players from crossing the picket line, the players chose not to picket the One Buccaneer Place headquarters. Players initially elected not to hold organized workouts, instead leaving conditioning up to the individuals. Organized workouts were later held at Jesuit High School, but were discontinued when it was felt that they gave management less incentive to bargain. Tampa Bay, who set up an information office with phone lines manned by players who kept teammates informed of all news, was considered by the union to be the most organized of all teams. The strike was estimated to cost the league $42 million per week in lost revenue, with each canceled game costing the players $500,000 in wages. Negotiations went very slowly, with management hoping to weaken union solidarity by prolonging the strike. Agreement was difficult, with both sides making demands vastly different from the other, and pronounced personality conflicts between union negotiator Ed Garvey and management representative Jack Donlan. Planned "All-Star" games by the players failed, due to a lack of participation by star-caliber players. One season ticket-holder retained attorney Ellis Rubin in a breach of contract suit against the Buccaneers over the cancelled games.

==== Harassment accusations ====
A belief among team owners that 13 games was the shortest practical season marked the weekend of October 24–25 as the point at which the season had to be cancelled. With that in mind, owners began considering opening camps to see how many players would show up. Garvey and union president Gene Upshaw termed talk of canceling the season "scare tactics", and sent a telegram stating such and reminding owners of their legal responsibility to negotiate. Shortly afterward, Stalls leveled accusations that a member of the coaching staff had made telephone calls to numerous players, asking them if they would return to camp if it was reopened, and whether they supported the union's proposed wage scale. This was perceived as an attempt to divide the players, and was denounced by the union's public relations director as "an unfair labor practice". Similar incidents were later reported in Cincinnati and Buffalo. Assistant to the president Phil Kreuger stated that the calls were made with the knowledge of McKay and owner Hugh Culverhouse, but the assistants were only to have asked the players what kind of physical condition they were in. This incident damaged McKay's relationship with the players, and it was later stated by Hugh Culverhouse, Jr. that it marked the point at which McKay lost his desire to coach the team.

==== Settlement ====
As the strike dragged on, Neal Colzie joined Williams in publicly opposing the union's stance, and several players who wanted to return to work organized a meeting to vote on the management council's latest proposal, apart from what they termed the "peer pressure" and intimidation of the team's union leaders. The players still rejected the proposal by a 36–4 margin. Divisions began to appear within the team, as Williams reported losing respect for younger players who he felt were bending to union pressure, and a public shouting match broke out between Williams and Charley Hannah. A settlement was reached shortly afterward, on November 16, with a guaranteed $1.17 billion to be paid to the players over the next five years. The contract was ratified by a 3–1 margin on December 8. Severance pay and minimum wage scales were added. It wound up being the longest and costliest strike in sports history, lasting 57 days and causing eight weekends of play to be cancelled, although one was rescheduled for the weekend of January 2–3. The NFL lost an estimated $275 million in revenue. Several players afterward reported feeling misled by Garvey, saying that many players had been hurt, while little had been gained.

=== Resumption of play ===
Play resumed on November 21 with a confidence-building narrow loss to the Dallas Cowboys. Thanks largely to mental errors, the Buccaneers were outscored 52–32 in their first three games, despite outgaining their opponents by an average yardage of 338 to 216. Their first win came in the fourth week over a previously undefeated Miami Dolphins team on Monday Night Football, McKay's first victory over Don Shula in seven meetings. The win left the Buccaneers tied with five other teams for last place in the NFC, with the toughest remaining schedule of the six. Each of their first four post-strike opponents entered the matchup with only one previous loss. Erratic performances continued to be a problem. Reversing their form of the previous year, which featured only one running back fumble in the entire season, the Buccaneers led the league in fumbles. Players credited a newfound maturity for their ability to rally from the large deficits caused by their mistake-prone play.

=== Schedule ===
Week	Date	Opponent	Result	Record	Venue	Attendance
1	September 12	at **Minnesota Vikings**	**L** 10–17	0–1	Hubert H. Humphrey Metrodome	58,440
2	September 19	Washington Redskins	**L** 13–21	0–2	Tampa Stadium	66,187
Players' strike
3	November 21	at Dallas Cowboys	**L** 9–14	0–3	Texas Stadium	49,578
4	November 29	Miami Dolphins	**W** 23–17	1–3	Tampa Stadium	65,854
5	December 5	at New Orleans Saints	**W** 13–10	2–3	Louisiana Superdome	61,709
6	December 12	at New York Jets	**L** 17–32	2–4	Shea Stadium	28,147
7	December 19	Buffalo Bills	**W** 24–23	3–4	Tampa Stadium	62,510
8	December 26	**Detroit Lions**	**W** 23–21	4–4	Tampa Stadium	65,997
9	January 2, 1983	**Chicago Bears**	**W** 26–23 (OT)	5–4	Tampa Stadium	68,112

Note: Intra-division opponents are in bold text.

=== Postseason ===
Round	Date	Opponent	Result	Record	Venue	Attendance
First round	January 9, 1983	at Dallas Cowboys (2)	**L** 17–30	0–1	Texas Stadium	65,042

== Standings ==
NFC Central
	W	L	T	PCT	DIV	CONF	PF	PA	STK
^{(3)} Green Bay Packers	5	3	1	.611	1–2	4–2	226	169	L1
^{(4)} Minnesota Vikings	5	4	0	.556	3–1	4–1	158	178	W3
^{(7)} Tampa Bay Buccaneers	5	4	0	.556	2–1	3–3	158	178	W1
^{(8)} Detroit Lions	4	5	0	.444	3–3	4–4	181	176	W1
Chicago Bears	3	6	0	.333	1–3	2–5	141	174	L1

NFC
#	Team	W	L	T	PCT	PF	PA	STK
Seeded postseason qualifiers
1	Washington Redskins	8	1	0	.889	190	128	W4
2	Dallas Cowboys	6	3	0	.667	226	145	L2
3	Green Bay Packers	5	3	1	.611	226	169	L1
4 (Note: Minnesota (4–1), Atlanta (4–3), St. Louis (5–4), Tampa Bay (3–3) seeds were determined by best won-lost record in conference games.)	Minnesota Vikings	5	4	0	.556	187	198	W1
5	Atlanta Falcons	5	4	0	.556	183	199	L2
6	St. Louis Cardinals	5	4	0	.556	135	170	L1
7	Tampa Bay Buccaneers	5	4	0	.556	158	178	W3
8 (Note: Detroit finished ahead of New Orleans and the N.Y. Giants based on best conference record (4–4 to Saints’ 3–5 to Giants’ 3–5).)	Detroit Lions	4	5	0	.444	181	176	W1
Did not qualify for the postseason
9	New Orleans Saints	4	5	0	.444	129	160	W1
10	New York Giants	4	5	0	.444	164	160	W1
11 (Note: San Francisco finished ahead of Chicago, and Chicago finished ahead of Philadelphia, based on conference record (49ers’ 2–3 to Bears’ 2–5 to Eagles’ 1–5).)	San Francisco 49ers	3	6	0	.333	209	206	L1
12	Chicago Bears	3	6	0	.333	141	174	L1
13	Philadelphia Eagles	3	6	0	.333	191	195	L1
14	Los Angeles Rams	2	7	0	.222	200	250	W1
Tiebreakers

== Personnel ==
=== Roster ===
1982 Tampa Bay Buccaneers roster
Quarterbacks (QB): 11 Jerry Golsteyn; 15 Jeff Quinn; 12 Doug Williams; Running backs (RB): 28 Mel Carver; 45 Terdell Middleton; 1 Michael Morton; 35 Rick Moser; 26 James Owens; 32 James Wilder; Wide receivers (WR): 83 Theo Bell; 87 Gerald Carter; 89 Kevin House; 84 Gordon Jones; 81 Andre Tyler; Tight ends (TE): 82 Jerry Bell; 88 Jimmie Giles; 86 Jim Obradovich	Offensive linemen (OL): 62 Sean Farrell G/T; 73 Charley Hannah T; 62 Jim Leonard G/C; 75 Dave Reavis T; 61 Greg Roberts G; 74 Gene Sanders T; 72 Ray Snell G; 50 Steve Wilson C; 68 George Yarno G; Defensive linemen (DL): 78 John Cannon DE; 76 David Logan NT; 66 Booker Reese DE; 63 Lee Roy Selmon DE; 65 Dave Stalls DE; 90 Brad White NT	Linebackers (LB): 52 Scot Brantley ILB; 58 Jeff Davis ILB; 53 Hugh Green OLB; 59 Andy Hawkins OLB; 55 Lemont Jeffers OLB; 56 Cecil Johnson ILB; 54 Richard Wood ILB; Defensive backs (DB): 34 Cedric Brown FS; 20 Neal Colzie SS; 44 Mark Cotney SS; 21 John Holt CB; 24 Tom Morris FS; 22 Johnny Ray Smith CB; 41 Norris Thomas CB; 40 Mike Washington CB; Special teams (ST): 3 Bill Capece K; 9 Larry Swider P	Reserve: 95 Kelvin Atkins LB (IR); 30 Dave Barrett RB (IR); 71 Randy Crowder NT (IR); 43 Jerry Eckwood RB (IR); 77 Bill Kollar DE (PUP); 29 Sandy LaBeaux CB (IR); 51 Dana Nafziger LB (IR); Rookies in italics

=== Coaching staff ===
1982 Tampa Bay Buccaneers staff
Front office: Owner – Hugh Culverhouse; Head coaches: Head coach – John McKay; Offensive coaches: Offensive line – Bill Johnson; Quarterbacks – Bill Nelsen; Receivers – Boyd Dowler; Running backs – Jim Gruden	Defensive coaches: Defensive coordinator/secondary – Wayne Fontes; Defensive line – Abe Gibron; Linebackers – Howard Tippett; Special teams coaches: Special teams – Frank Emanuel

== Game summaries ==
=== Week 1: at Minnesota Vikings ===
	1	2	3	4	Total
Buccaneers	3	0	0	7	10
Vikings	0	7	7	3	17

September 12, 1982, at Hubert H. Humphrey Metrodome, Minneapolis, Minnesota

The Buccaneers faced the Vikings in the first regular-season game played in the Hubert H. Humphrey Metrodome The Buccaneers outperformed the Vikings in the early stages of the game, but were not able to establish a significant lead. Players reported being surprised by the Vikings' heretofore-unseen emphasis on the running game. McKay singled out the offensive line as performing very poorly, a performance he attributed to a lack of enthusiasm. He stated that guard Sean Farrell played like a rookie, but tempered his criticism by pointing out that Farrell was playing while injured. The constant Viking pass rush required the Buccaneers to resort to quarterback rollout plays. Guard Ray Snell suffered a knee injury that sidelined him for several weeks. Players complained of difficulty breathing due to the lack of adequate air conditioning in the Metrodome. By McKay's count, the team made 12 major errors, ruining their chances against a Vikings team who was also considered not to have played a good game. Citing league rules, McKay refused to comment on complaints about the officiating, though others alleged that specifics were that: audibles could not be called due to the crowd noise, Lee Roy Selmon was repeatedly held, and that Hugh Green and Mark Cotney were not guilty of called penalties that extended a Minnesota drive that eventually led to a touchdown. Several Buccaneers protested that Cotney's roughing the kicker penalty was the result of punter Greg Coleman tripping Cotney, and then pretending to have been hit. Coleman was later awarded a mock Oscar by Minnesota newspapers. Opposing coach Bud Grant described the officiating errors as "enough to make a grown man cry". A pair of out-of-bounds calls, including one which negated a Buccaneer fumble recovery, were also considered to be questionable. The Buccaneers attempted a late rally, inspired by the taunting of Vikings quarterback Tommy Kramer, who claimed to have been spit on by Neal Colzie. The team's only touchdown came in the fourth quarter on a Doug Williams pass to Jimmie Giles. A potential game-tying drive ended when Matt Blair tipped a Williams pass that went to Willie Teal for an interception. Williams was intercepted three times in all. It was Tampa Bay's first season-opening loss since 1978. Giles' touchdown was his 20th, which moved him past Ricky Bell to become the Buccaneers' all-time touchdown leader. Williams had a single 12-yard carry that moved him into 4th place all-time in team rushing.

=== Week 2: vs Washington Redskins ===
	1	2	3	4	Total
Redskins	9	9	0	3	21
Buccaneers	0	6	0	7	13

September 19, 1982, at Tampa Stadium, Tampa, Florida

For the second week in a row, the Buccaneers lost to an opponent they outgained, due to numerous errors. The first half was played in a torrential downpour in which lightning struck Tampa Stadium. The Buccaneers had ball-handling problems, fumbling the center snap four times. Joe Theismann credited purposeful practice in the rain to his avoidance of the type of struggles that Williams had. Two of Williams' fumbles led to Mark Moseley field goals, while the other two hurt Tampa Bay's field position. The Buccaneers were able to close the lead to 18–13 in the fourth quarter, before Washington was able to dominate the game with their running. The home crowd booed the team, particularly Williams, through the first half. For the second week in a row, they ended an opponent's drive, only to give the opponent a second chance due to a defensive holding penalty. The Redskins ran the ball 45 times, 43 of them to their right side (away from Lee Roy Selmon and Hugh Green), despite injury problems on that side of their line. John Riggins' 34 carries tied the Redskins record set in 1937 by Cliff Battles, remained for several years as the record by a Buccaneer opponent, and extended his streak to 236 consecutive carries without fumbling. At one point, he carried seven straight times for 48 yards. Former Buccaneer Curtis Jordan scored the winning touchdown when he recovered his own block of a Larry Swider punt in the end zone. The Redskins noticed the Buccaneer center's tendency to drop his head while snapping, and used that to their advantage on Jordan's punt block. A late rally attempt fizzled when an apparent 71-yard Doug Williams touchdown pass to Kevin House was called back when House was ruled to have been pushed out of bounds. Having opened the season with two victories over 1981 playoff teams, Washington, coach Joe Gibbs told his players, "We're hot, let's not strike now".

=== Week 3: at Dallas Cowboys ===
	1	2	3	4	Total
Buccaneers	3	3	3	0	9
Cowboys	0	7	7	0	14

November 21, 1982, at Texas Stadium, Irving, Texas

Post-strike play resumed in a matchup with the Dallas Cowboys. The 13,439 no-shows were the highest number in Dallas since an ice storm eight years earlier, and broke the Cowboys' string of 44 consecutive sellouts. Fan expectations were low for the game, as both teams were expected to be in poor physical condition following the layoff. The crowd in attendance became more vocal as the game went on, thanks largely to a series of questionable calls by the officials, all against Dallas. The Buccaneers were held to nine points, despite five possessions inside the Dallas 10-yard line, and despite statistically outperforming the Cowboys on both offense and defense. Doug Williams completed 23 of 42 passes with no interceptions, and James Wilder rushed 12 times for 67 yards. The Buccaneers were plagued by mistakes such as Theo Bell dropping a pass in the end zone, and Bill Capece missing a 24-yard field goal attempt. The Cowboys, for their part, only twice were able to move the ball into Buccaneer territory. Reserve fullback Robert Newhouse scored the winning points on a 3-yard third-quarter run. The Buccaneers had the ball in the final minute, but Kevin House was ruled out of bounds on a potentially game-winning end-zone reception. Jimmie Giles' fumble on the following play was recovered by Michael Downs at the Dallas 1-yard line with five seconds remaining. Buccaneer players were upbeat after the loss, feeling vindicated that they had been able to play competitively with the Cowboys, as contrasted with their playoff loss of the previous season. McKay credited Tom Landry's coaching, saying that the Cowboys were not much more talented than the Buccaneers.

=== Week 4: vs Miami Dolphins ===
	1	2	3	4	Total
Dolphins	0	3	0	14	17
Buccaneers	3	3	10	7	23

November 28, 1982, at Tampa Stadium, Tampa, Florida

Don Strock, playing the second half in relief of ineffective Dolphins quarterback David Woodley, was intercepted four times by the Buccaneer secondary, which had made only one interception in the preceding three games. The Buccaneers' five interceptions were a home-field record. The Buccaneers took a 16–3 lead on Bill Capece field goals of 27, 28, and 36 yards, and a 3-yard Doug Williams touchdown run. Strock then threw a 7-yard touchdown pass to Joe Rose, the Dolphins' first touchdown since September 19. On the Dolphins' next possession, Neal Colzie faked a coverage shift to the outside, but instead cut back to the middle. This left Colzie, a native of Miami's Coconut Grove neighborhood, in position to catch a 51-yard interception which set up a 1-yard James Wilder touchdown. An 11-yard Rose touchdown reception brought the Dolphins to within a touchdown with 34 seconds left. The Dolphins were able to get the ball back after an onside kick, but Mike Washington's game-ending end-zone interception preserved the win. James Owens rushed for 82 yards on 18 carries, his second-highest total as a Buccaneer. Williams completed only 7 of 19 passes for 81 yards and no touchdowns, which broke his 27-game streak of 100-yard passing games that dated back to October 26, 1980. A new defensive statistic was created to account for the Buccaneers' performance in this game. The Elias Sports Bureau, who had been unable to conceive of a situation in which three or four defensive players reach a quarterback at the same time, was forced to credit Dave Logan, Hugh Green, and Andy Hawkins each with one third of a sack when they all tackled Woodley simultaneously. Colzie, not simply content to have played a large part in defeating the coach who had previously demoted and traded him, afterward accused Don Shula of intolerance toward outspoken black players.

=== Week 5: at New Orleans Saints ===
	1	2	3	4	Total
Buccaneers	0	3	10	0	13
Saints	7	0	3	0	10

December 5, 1982, at Louisiana Superdome, New Orleans, Louisiana

Hoping to match their win total of the entire previous season, the Saints entered the game hoping for a team-record fourth consecutive victory. McKay compared the Saints to the San Francisco 49ers, who the previous season had made the leap to Super Bowl champion after years of poor performances. In playoff contention for the first time in franchise history, the Saints entered the game with a defense ranked second only to Tampa Bay's in the NFC. Louisiana native Doug Williams felt at home playing in front of the New Orleans crowd. Saints quarterback Ken Stabler completed 29 of 43 passes for 333 yards and no interceptions, completing passes to nine different receivers. He threw often at inexperienced cornerback Johnny Ray Smith, Mike Washington's injury replacement. The Buccaneers blitzed heavily, mainly from the safeties, as the Saints' double-tight end formation prevented the Buccaneers' regular pass rush from reaching Stabler. They sent both safeties on one play, with Cedric Brown disrupting Stabler's handoff to George Rogers and causing a fumble that Neal Colzie recovered. Colzie was sent frequently on blitzes, and later reported mixed emotions about having to hit his former teammate Stabler. The win was preserved with Dave Stalls' sack of Stabler in the final minute of play, which drove the Saints out of Morten Andersen's regular field goal range. Andersen's last-minute 60-yard attempt missed narrowly. The Buccaneers were the beneficiary of a questionable offensive pass interference penalty against the Saints' Larry Hardy during the Saints' final drive. An earlier Saints drive ended when Hugh Green's hit on Hardy caused a fumble that Smith recovered. McKay said afterward that neither team deserved to lose.

=== Week 6: at New York Jets ===
	1	2	3	4	Total
Buccaneers	0	3	7	7	17
Jets	14	0	9	9	32

December 12 at Shea Stadium, Flushing, New York

The Buccaneers suffered a loss to the New York Jets in a game played in snow and a 20-mile per hour wind. It was Doug Williams' first game played in the snow, and only the second outdoor December game in the north ever played by the Buccaneers. The Buccaneers wore knitted hoods to cope with the −5 °F or −20.6 °C degree wind chill factor, the first time this apparel had been worn in an NFL game. They made numerous errors, fumbling a kickoff, bobbling four kicks, and dropping several passes. Four Buccaneer turnovers led to 19 Jet points, and helped the Jets to take a 14–0 lead before Tampa Bay's first offensive play. Williams declined to blame the weather for the team's performance, and McKay said that "If we had anything frozen, it was our brains". The Buccaneers set a still-standing team record by fumbling eight times, losing three. A pass interference call against Jim Obradovich caused a 15-yard completion to Gerald Carter to be called back. Jets offensive coordinator Joe Walton instructed quarterback Richard Todd to avoid long passes due to the weather. Williams attempted long passes, but was intercepted twice, completing 18 of 38 passes for 204 yards. The loss tarnished good performances by James Wilder, whose 116 yards on 11 receptions set club records for passing yardage and receptions by a running back, and the offensive line, who stymied the Jets' New York Sack Exchange defensive line. League-leading rusher Freeman McNeil was held to 53 yards on 14 carries, and fumbled twice. The Jets had to play without middle linebacker Stan Blinka, who had been suspended for delivering a forearm blow to the head of Packers receiver John Jefferson. There were 32,223 no-shows, the most in the league all season and the Jets' smallest-ever crowd in Shea Stadium. The Jets' 32 points were the most scored against the Buccaneers since 1980. It was the Jets' fifth consecutive win, giving them the best start in their history at 5–1.

=== Week 7: vs Buffalo Bills ===
	1	2	3	4	Total
Bills	6	3	7	7	23
Buccaneers	0	10	7	7	24

December 19, 1982, at Tampa Stadium, Tampa, Florida

Playing against the NFL's top-ranked defense, the Buccaneers took the lead twice on drives of 77 and 88 yards. Doug Williams completed 20 of 36 passes for 204 yards and two touchdowns. Williams became the first Buccaneer quarterback to pass the 12,000 career yard mark, while Kevin House became the first Buccaneer receiver with 2,000 career yards. Booker Reese recorded his first NFL sack. Bill Capece missed a field goal that would have tied Garo Yepremian's club record of seven straight, then later suffered a dislocated shoulder. Melvin Carver's 89 rushing yards in his first NFL start were a season high for Buccaneer running backs. Carver caught a 2-yard Doug Williams touchdown pass, and ran 13 yards for another touchdown. Gordon Jones caught his first touchdown of the season. An interference penalty on Bill Simpson put the Buccaneers in position for a field goal that gave Tampa Bay a 10–9 halftime lead. Simpson later caught one of Williams' three interceptions, setting up a 24-yard touchdown drive. Eugene Marve caught the second in the Buffalo end zone, causing Williams to be booed. The first quarter included a play on which four separate penalties were called, three interceptions (two by Williams), a fake field goal, a missed extra-point, a 50-yard kickoff return, and two occasions on which Buffalo chose to run a play instead of punting on fourth down. Buccaneer special teams allowed 138 yards in kickoff returns. The Bills scored on two runs by Leaks, and one by quarterback Joe Ferguson. Ferguson threw three interceptions, including Hugh Green's first of the season. Buffalo had the ball in field goal range in the final minute, but the win was preserved when Lee Roy Selmon forced a fumble by Bills fullback Roosevelt Leaks at the Buccaneer 18 with 36 seconds to play, on the same double-safety blitz which had caused a key fumble in the Dolphins game. On Tampa Bay's final possession, Carver's habit of quickly laying the ball down after being tackled nearly became a problem when he was tackled at the Tampa Bay 18 with 24 seconds left. The Bills mistook this for a fumble and began to celebrate, until the officials ruled that the ball was dead.

=== Week 8: vs Detroit Lions ===
	1	2	3	4	Total
Lions	7	7	7	0	21
Buccaneers	0	6	7	10	23

December 26, 1982, at Tampa Stadium, Tampa, Florida

Local product and former Florida Gators kicker Brian Clark was signed to take the injured Bill Capece's place on kickoffs, but was benched after failing to get the ball inside the Lions' 20-yard line on two attempts. Norris Thomas said that the Buccaneers "stunk up the joint" and could not do anything right until the third quarter. After allowing the Lions a 21–6 third quarter lead, the Buccaneer defense stopped them on three consecutive plays on one series, and only allowed them only nine yards the rest of the game. Gary Danielson was held to one completion on four second-half pass attempts, while Billy Sims was held to 68 yards on 21 carries. The Lions' pass rush kept the Buccaneers from attempting long passes, despite the injury-riddled nature of the Lions' secondary. Doug Williams brought the team to within one point on a three—yard touchdown run and a 2-yard pass to James Owens. A late fourth-quarter interference call against Bobby Watkins gave the Buccaneers field position on the Detroit 13-yard line. The Lions were angered by this call, as they believed that Williams had overthrown Kevin House on the play, and that House had interfered with Watkins. McKay admitted that the Lions had a "legitimate gripe" about the call, but pointed to an earlier play on which Giles was ruled to have fumbled, despite the Buccaneers' belief that Giles was already down and that the play was over. Bill Capece kicked field goals of 34 and 29 yards, and scored the winning points on a 27-yard field goal with 25 seconds left. Detroit linebacker Stan White taunted Capece with calls of "Remember Oakland last year?" as Capece prepared to kick, referring to a block of Capece's potentially game-winning field goal against the Raiders.

=== Week 9: vs Chicago Bears ===
	1	2	3	4	OT	Total
Bears	3	17	3	0	0	23
Buccaneers	0	6	7	10	3	26

January 2, 1983, at Tampa Stadium, Tampa, Florida

Doug Williams overcame several early turnovers and an aching knee and hamstring to throw touchdowns of 35 and 31 yards to Jimmie Giles that brought the Buccaneers back from a 23–6 deficit. Otis Wilson returned one of Williams' interceptions 39 yards for a touchdown. A Gary Fencik interception and a Steve McMichael fumble recovery led to field goals. Bears players pointed to a missed 38-yard Bill Capece field goal attempt early in the fourth quarter as the point where the Bears' offense relaxed and the game turned. Following that play, a holding penalty and a Neal Colzie sack of Jim McMahon drove the Bears back to the 5-yard line, setting up the touchdown drive that brought the Buccaneers to within three points. Capece tied the score by kicking a 40-yard field goal with 26 seconds left. After 20 consecutive pass attempts, the Buccaneers pitched right to James Wilder for their first offensive play in overtime. The play caught the Bears blitzing the middle in a nickel defense, and resulted in the Buccaneers' longest run play of the year, 47 yards to the Chicago 13-yard line. Saying that "He who messes around in field goal position lives to regret it", McKay immediately sent Capece to kick the winning field goal. Capece set records by being the first Buccaneer to kick four field goals in a game, and to kick 18 field goals in a season. Williams passed and rushed for 397 combined yards, still the fifth highest total in Buccaneer history. James Owens' 30-yard kickoff return was the team's longest of the season. Buccaneer and Bear players alike credited the loud Tampa Stadium crowd as a factor in the win.

== Playoffs ==
=== NFC First Round ===
- Dallas Cowboys 30, Tampa Bay Buccaneers 17

	1	2	3	4	Total
Buccaneers	0	10	7	0	17
Cowboys	6	7	3	14	30

at Texas Stadium, Irving, Texas

- Game time: 4:00 p.m. EST/3:00 p.m. CST
- TV announcers (CBS): Pat Summerall and John Madden

Injuries to Mike Washington, Cedric Brown, and Johnny Ray Smith required that three members of the secondary play outside of their regular position. Neal Colzie took over for Brown at free safety, while Mark Cotney took over Colzie's regular strong safety spot. Dwayne O'Steen, a starter from Oakland's Super Bowl XIV team, was signed during the week to add depth to the secondary. Both quarterbacks played while injured. Dallas quarterback Danny White's thumb was so sore that he could not hold a piece of paper. His jaw was so sore that he was not able to eat before the game, and required novocain shots to play. He would not have played if it had been a regular-season matchup, but passed for 312 yards and two touchdowns. The advisability of starting Doug Williams was later questioned, due to his sore hamstring and knee. Williams spent the entire game throwing away from his former Grambling teammate Everson Walls, throwing only four times for one completion to Walls' side of the field. Against expectations, Tampa Bay's defense played well, despite spending over 40 minutes of the game on the field, and despite the injuries to the secondary and later to Hugh Green. Dallas entered the game as the best rushing team of all playoff contenders, with Tony Dorsett second only to Freeman McNeil in yardage.

After the Cowboys took a first quarter lead on two Rafael Septién field goals, the Buccaneers took the lead when the ball popped out of the hands of White and into those of Hugh Green. Green never broke stride, and returned the fumble 60 yards for a touchdown. The play happened so quickly that the Dallas offensive line continued to block, unaware that Green was downfield with the ball. Cotney then returned an interception 50 yards, leading to a 32-yard Bill Capece field goal. A 6-yard pass from White to Ron Springs gave the Cowboys a 13–10 halftime lead. After a third-quarter Septien field goal, Williams threw a 49-yard touchdown pass to Gordon Jones to give the Buccaneers a 17–16 lead. Early in the fourth quarter, Charley Hannah was penalized for an illegal block, which negated an 11-yard James Wilder run. Hannah kicked the referee's flag in protest, resulting in a further call of unsportsmanlike conduct, a penalty of half the distance to the goal line. The two penalties combined to move the Buccaneers back from their 33 to their 11-yard line. McKay was outraged that the officials called such a penalty in such an important game, sarcastically describing Hannah's actions as "horrible abuse. One of the worst things I've ever seen on a football field". On the following play, third-string safety Monty Hunter made his first career interception, a pass intended for Jimmie Giles, and returned it for the go-ahead touchdown. Dallas followed with an 81-yard drive that ended in a 10-yard pass from White to Timmy Newsome. Linebackers coach Howard Tippett followed field judge Dick Dolack all the way back to the locker room after the game, shouting obscenities the entire way, and telling him, "You cost us this game".

== Awards and honors ==
- Jimmie Giles, Pro Bowl starter
- Hugh Green, Pro Bowl starter
- Lee Roy Selmon, Pro Bowl starter
- Neal Colzie, team Most Valuable Player
- Neal Colzie, second-team All-Pro
- Hugh Green, second-team All-Pro
- Lee Roy Selmon, second-team All-Pro
- Sean Farrell, NFL All-Rookie team
- Lee Roy Selmon, Pro Bowl Co-Most Valuable Player

== Team and individual records ==
Some team records set in 1982 still stand. The following would remain team records if averaged and projected out to a full 16-game season:

- Fewest penalties allowed in a season (38)
- Fewest yards penalized in a season (297)
- Most fumbles in a game (8 vs. New York Jets, 12/12)

The following remains a record due to the shortened season, but is not on pace for a record if projected out to a full season:

- Fewest sacks allowed (11), only one short of the 12 allowed by the 1979 team

The following records set in 1982 have since been broken:

- Fewest passes intercepted (11, broken in 2002)
- Most rushing attempts by an opposing player (34 by John Riggins of Washington on 9/19, broken by Heath Sherman of Philadelphia on 10/6/1991)
- Most points placekicking, single game (14 by Bill Capece against Chicago on 1/1/83, later tied by three others and broken twice by Martin Gramatica)

The 1982 players strike was in the single game
