= Mel Carver =

American football player (born 1959)

No. 28, 30
- Position: Running back

Personal information
- Born: July 14, 1959 (age 67); Pensacola, Florida, U.S.
- Listed height: 5 ft 11 in (1.80 m)
- Listed weight: 221 lb (100 kg)

Career information
- High school: Encinal (Alameda, California)
- College: Laney (1978–1979); UNLV (1980–1981)
- NFL draft: 1982: undrafted

Career history
- Tampa Bay Buccaneers (1982–1985); Indianapolis Colts (1986)*; Indianapolis Colts (1987–1988)
- * Offseason or practice squad member only

Career NFL statistics
- Rushing yards: 624
- Rushing average: 3.2
- Rushing touchdowns: 1
- Receptions: 39
- Receiving yards: 335
- Receiving touchdowns: 2
- Stats at Pro Football Reference

Melvin J. Carver (born July 14, 1959) is an American former professional football player who was a running back in the National Football League (NFL) for the Tampa Bay Buccaneers and the Indianapolis Colts. He played college football for the Laney Eagles and the UNLV Rebels.

== College career ==
Carver played college football for the Laney Eagles from 1978 to 1979 and the UNLV Rebels from 1980 to 1981. In his two seasons at UNLV, he rushed 158 times for 857 yards and six touchdowns. Carver also caught 22 passes for 153 yards and three receiving touchdowns.

== Professional career ==
=== Tampa Bay Buccaneers ===
After not being selected in the 1982 NFL draft, Carver signed with the Tampa Bay Buccaneers as an undrafted free agent. He played in nine games his rookie year, compiling 229 rushing yards on 70 attempts, four receptions, 48 receiving yards and two total touchdowns.

Carver's second season was his best playing in all 16 games, starting in nine, rushing 114 times for 348 yards, 32 receptions for 262 yards and one reception.

His 1984 campaign was cut short after five games, going on the injured reserve list on October 3, 1984. Carver rushed 11 times for 44 yards and caught 3 passes for 27 yards.

Carver was released by the Buccaneers on September 16, 1985. He played in two games but did not record any statistics.

=== Indianapolis Colts (first stint) ===
Carver signed with the Indianapolis Colts on June 27, 1986 but was released on August 11, 1986.

=== Indianapolis Colts (second stint) ===
Carver signed with the Colts again on October 13, 1987, playing one game, where he rushed two times for three yards, before he was released on November 2, 1987.

He signed a reserve/future contract with the Colts on December 3, 1987. Carver was released as part of roster cut downs on August 29, 1988.

== NFL career statistics ==
Legend
**Bold**	Career high

=== Regular season ===
Year	Team	Games		Rushing				Receiving			
Year	Team	GP	GS	Att	Yds	Avg	TD	Rec	Yds	Avg	TD
1982	TB	9	1	70	229	3.3	**1**	4	46	**11.5**	**1**
1983	TB	16	9	**114**	**348**	3.1	0	**32**	**262**	8.2	**1**
1984	TB	5	1	11	44	**4.0**	0	3	27	9.0	0
1985	TB	2	0	0	0	0.0	0	0	0	0.0	0
1987	IND	1	0	2	3	1.5	0	0	0	0.0	0
Career		33	11	197	624	3.2	1	39	335	9.6	2

=== Playoffs ===
Year	Team	Games		Rushing			
Year	Team	GP	GS	Att	Yds	Avg	TD
1982	TB	1	1	7	12	1.7	0
Career		1	1	7	12	1.7	0
