= Larry Swider =

American football player (1955–2021)

No. 12, 10, 9
- Position: Punter

Personal information
- Born: February 1, 1955; Limestone, Maine, U.S.
- Died: August 7, 2021 (aged 66); Fayetteville, Texas, U.S.
- Listed height: 6 ft 2 in (1.88 m)
- Listed weight: 195 lb (88 kg)

Career information
- College: Pittsburgh
- NFL draft: 1977: 7th round, 185th overall pick

Career history
- Detroit Lions (1979); St. Louis Cardinals (1980); Tampa Bay Buccaneers (1981–1982); Pittsburgh Maulers (1984); Jacksonville Bulls (1985)

Awards and highlights
- National champion (1976)

Career NFL statistics
- Punts: 284
- Punt yards: 11,730
- Longest punt: 72
- Stats at Pro Football Reference

Lawrence John Swider (February 1, 1955 – August 7, 2021) was an American professional football punter. He attended DuBois Area High School in DuBois, Pennsylvania, where he was a standout athlete. He played in the National Football League (NFL) from 1979 to 1982. He then played in the United States Football League (USFL) for the Pittsburgh Maulers and the Jacksonville Bulls.

Swider died on August 7, 2021, in Fayetteville, Texas, at age 66.

== NFL career statistics ==
Legend
	Led the league
**Bold**	Career high

=== Regular season ===
Year	Team	Punting									
Year	Team	GP	Punts	Yds	Net Yds	Lng	Avg	Net Avg	Blk	Ins20	TB
1979	DET	14	88	3,523	2,948	**72**	40.0	**33.5**	0	**13**	7
1980	STL	**16**	**99**	**4,111**	**3,166**	66	41.5	31.7	1	12	**15**
1981	TAM	13	58	2,476	1,987	62	**42.7**	33.1	**2**	**13**	4
1982	TAM	9	39	1,620	1,308	59	41.5	32.7	1	6	6
Career		52	284	11,730	9,409	72	41.3	32.7	4	44	32

=== Playoffs ===
Year	Team	Punting									
Year	Team	GP	Punts	Yds	Net Yds	Lng	Avg	Net Avg	Blk	Ins20	TB
1981	TAM	**1**	5	192	139	**52**	38.4	27.8	0	0	0
1982	TAM	**1**	**6**	**261**	**204**	**52**	**43.5**	**34.0**	0	**1**	0
Career		2	11	453	343	52	41.2	31.2	0	1	0
