= Johnny Ray Smith =

American football player (born 1957)

No. 22, 45
- Position: Defensive back

Personal information
- Born: September 7, 1957 (age 69); Crockett, Texas, U.S.
- Listed height: 5 ft 9 in (1.75 m)
- Listed weight: 183 lb (83 kg)

Career information
- High school: Cleveland (Cleveland, Texas)
- College: Lamar (1977–1980)
- NFL draft: 1981: 11th round, 283rd overall pick

Career history
- Tampa Bay Buccaneers (1981–1984); San Diego Chargers (1984–1986)

Awards and highlights
- First-team All-SLC (1980); Second-team All-SLC (1977)

Career NFL statistics
- Games played: 26
- Games started: 2
- Fumble recoveries: 6
- Kickoff return yards: 183
- Stats at Pro Football Reference

Johnny Ray Smith (born September 7, 1957) is an American former professional football player who was a defensive back in the National Football League (NFL) for the Tampa Bay Buccaneers and the San Diego Chargers. He played college football for the Lamar Cardinals.

== College career ==
Smith played college football for the Lamar Cardinals from 1977 to 1980. On the defensive side of the ball he had 12 interceptions, returning two of them for touchdowns. Smith led the Southland Conference with six interceptions in 1979. He was the team's return man from his sophomore year on, totaling 420 punt return yards and two punt return touchdowns and 1,147 kick return yards and one kickoff return touchdown. Smith was a all conference selection twice in his career, second-team in 1977, and first-team in 1980.

Smith was also a member of the track and field team at Lamar, where he earned first-team All-SLC honors in the 100 meters.

== Professional career ==
=== Tampa Bay Buccaneers ===
Smith was selected in the 11th round with the 283rd overall pick by the Tampa Bay Buccaneers in the 1981 NFL draft. He was placed on injured reserve on August 31, 1981, and missed his entire rookie season.

In 1982, he made his NFL debut in week 1 against the Minnesota Vikings, Returning a kickoff for 24 yards. Smith finished his first year with three fumble recoveries and 47 kickoff return yards, in nine games, including his first start against the New York Jets.

The following year, Smith played in all 16 games, starting in one, recording another three fumble recoveries and 136 kickoff return yards.

On August 21, 1984, Smith was placed on injured reserve. He was released on November 1, 1984.

=== San Diego Chargers ===
On November 2, 1984, Smith was claimed off waivers by the San Diego Chargers. He played one game against the Indianapolis Colts, before being placed on the injured reserve list on November 9, 1984. Smith was released by the team on July 21, 1985.
