= Nilo Silvan =

American football player (born 1973)

No. 87
- Position: Wide receiver

Personal information
- Born: October 2, 1973 (age 53); Covington, Louisiana, U.S.
- Listed height: 5 ft 9 in (1.75 m)
- Listed weight: 176 lb (80 kg)

Career information
- High school: St. Paul's School (Covington)
- College: Tennessee
- NFL draft: 1996: 6th round, 180th overall pick

Career history
- Tampa Bay Buccaneers (1996)

Career NFL statistics
- Games played: 7
- Return yards: 739
- Stats at Pro Football Reference

Nilo Kyle Silvan (born October 2, 1973) is an American former professional football player who was a wide receiver for the Tampa Bay Buccaneers of the National Football League (NFL). He played college football for the Tennessee Volunteers and was selected by the Buccaneers in the sixth round of the 1996 NFL draft with the 180th overall pick. In his one season in the NFL, he appeared in seven games and handled some kickoff and punt return duties.
