= Jeb Terry =

American football player (born 1981)

No. 77
- Position: Guard

Personal information
- Born: April 10, 1981 (age 45); Dallas, Texas, U.S.
- Listed height: 6 ft 5 in (1.96 m)
- Listed weight: 320 lb (145 kg)

Career information
- High school: Culver Academies (Culver, Indiana)
- College: North Carolina
- NFL draft: 2004: 5th round, 146th overall pick

Career history
- Tampa Bay Buccaneers (2004–2006); San Francisco 49ers (2008)*
- * Offseason or practice squad member only

Awards and highlights
- Second-team All-ACC (2003)

Career NFL statistics
- Games played: 30
- Games started: 1
- Stats at Pro Football Reference

Jeb Barton Terry Jr. (born April 10, 1981) is an American former professional football player who was a guard in the National Football League (NFL). He was selected by the Tampa Bay Buccaneers in the fifth round of the 2004 NFL draft. He played college football for the North Carolina Tar Heels. He played for Culver Military Academy at the high school level.

Terry was also a member of the San Francisco 49ers.

Terry is the CEO of Cosm, a technology company.
