= Michael Smith (running back) =

American football player and coach (born 1988)

Northern Colorado Bears
- Title: Associate head coach, special teams coordinator, & running backs coach

Personal information
- Born: August 9, 1988 (age 38); Tucson, Arizona, U.S.
- Listed height: 5 ft 9 in (1.75 m)
- Listed weight: 205 lb (93 kg)

Career information
- High school: Sunnyside (Tucson)
- College: Utah State
- NFL draft: 2012: 7th round, 212th overall pick

Career history

Playing
- Tampa Bay Buccaneers (2012–2013); New York Jets (2014)*; Ottawa Redblacks (2014)*
- * Offseason or practice squad member only

Coaching
- Oregon State (2015–2017) Graduate assistant; BYU (2018) Defensive analyst; Dixie State (2019–2020) Defensive backs coach; Dixie State (2021) Defensive pass game coordinator & cornerbacks coach; Utah Tech (2022) Defensive pass game coordinator & safeties coach; Northern Colorado (2023) Associate head coach, run game coordinator, & running backs coach; Northern Colorado (2024–present) Associate head coach, special teams coordinator, & running backs coach
- Stats at Pro Football Reference

Michael Smith (born August 9, 1988) is an American college football coach and former running back. He is the associate head coach, special teams coordinator, and running backs coach for the University of Northern Colorado, a position he has held since 2024. He was drafted by the Tampa Bay Buccaneers of the National Football League (NFL) in the seventh round of the 2012 NFL draft. He played college football at Utah State. He also played for the New York Jets and the Ottawa Redblacks of the Canadian Football League (CFL). He also coached for Oregon State, BYU, and Dixie State/Utah Tech.

== Professional career ==
=== Tampa Bay Buccaneers ===
Smith was selected in the seventh round of the 2012 NFL draft by the Tampa Bay Buccaneers. On May 7, 2012, Smith signed a four-year deal with the Bucs to officially join the Buccaneers roster. The deal was worth $2.165 million over four years and included a $66,000 signing bonus.

=== New York Jets ===
Smith signed a one-year contract with the New York Jets on August 1, 2014. He was released on August 23.

=== Ottawa Redblacks ===
In 2014, Smith signed with the Ottawa Redblacks of the Canadian Football League (CFL).

== Coaching career ==
In 2015, Smith joined Oregon State as a graduate assistant.

In 2018, Smith was hired as a defensive analyst for BYU.

In 2019, Smith was hired as the defensive backs coach for Dixie State. In 2021, he became the defensive pass game coordinator and cornerbacks coach. In 2022, he retained his position as defensive pass game coordinator but also became the safeties coach.

In 2023, Smith was hired as the associate head coach, run game coordinator, and running backs coach for Northern Colorado. In 2024, Smith retained his roles as associate head coach and running backs coach but also became the special teams coordinator.
