= Anthony McDowell =

American football player (born 1968)

No. 37, 33
- Position: Running back

Personal information
- Born: November 12, 1968 (age 57); Augsburg, West Germany
- Listed height: 5 ft 11 in (1.80 m)
- Listed weight: 235 lb (107 kg)

Career information
- High school: Killeen (Killeen, Texas, U.S.)
- College: Texas Tech
- NFL draft: 1992: 8th round, 200th overall pick

Career history
- Tampa Bay Buccaneers (1992–1994); Washington Redskins (1995)*
- * Offseason or practice squad member only

Career NFL statistics
- Rushing yards: 145
- Rushing average: 3.9
- Receptions: 64
- Receiving yards: 477
- Total touchdowns: 4
- Stats at Pro Football Reference

Anthony Leguinn McDowell is a former professional American football player who played running back for three seasons for the Tampa Bay Buccaneers. He was selected by the Buccaneers in the eighth round of the 1992 NFL draft.

He was featured on Season 11, Episode 5 of Undercover Boss. He works as a manager of a Round Table Pizza franchise in Dallas, Texas.
