= Sandy LaBeaux =

American football player (born 1961)

No. 29
- Position: Cornerback

Personal information
- Born: August 22, 1961 (age 65); San Antonio, Texas, U.S.
- Listed height: 6 ft 2 in (1.88 m)
- Listed weight: 210 lb (95 kg)

Career information
- High school: California (San Ramon, California)
- College: Cal State Hayward
- NFL draft: 1982: undrafted

Career history
- Tampa Bay Buccaneers (1982–1983); Houston Gamblers (1985)
- Stats at Pro Football Reference

Sandy LaBeaux (born August 22, 1961) is an American former professional football player who was a cornerback in the National Football League (NFL) and United States Football League (USFL). He played college football for the Cal State Hayward Pioneers. He played in the NFL for the Tampa Bay Buccaneers in 1983 and with the USFL's Houston Gamblers in 1985.
