= Charles Bennett (defensive end, born 1983) =

American football player (born 1983)

No. 93
- Position: Defensive end

Personal information
- Born: April 4, 1983 (age 43); Camden, South Carolina, U.S.
- Listed height: 6 ft 4 in (1.93 m)
- Listed weight: 254 lb (115 kg)

Career information
- High school: Camden
- College: Clemson
- NFL draft: 2006: 7th round, 241st overall pick

Career history
- Tampa Bay Buccaneers (2006–2007); Tennessee Titans (2008–2009)*; Las Vegas Locomotives (2009)*
- * Offseason or practice squad member only

Career NFL statistics
- Total tackles: 2
- Stats at Pro Football Reference

Charles Dantonja Bennett (born April 4, 1983) is an American former professional football player who was a defensive end in the National Football League (NFL). He played college football for the Clemson Tigers and was selected by the Tampa Bay Buccaneers in the seventh round of the 2006 NFL draft.

Bennett was also a member of the Tennessee Titans and Las Vegas Locomotives.

== Professional career ==
Pre-draft measurables
Height	Weight	Arm length	Hand span	40-yard dash	10-yard split	20-yard split	20-yard shuttle	Three-cone drill	Vertical jump	Broad jump	Bench press
6 ft 3 5/8 in (1.92 m)	258 lb (117 kg)	33 7/8 in (0.86 m)	10 5/8 in (0.27 m)	4.74 s	1.61 s	2.76 s	4.52 s	7.48 s	33.5 in (0.85 m)	9 ft 7 in (2.92 m)	19 reps
All values from NFL Combine

Bennett was signed by the Las Vegas Locomotives of the United Football League on September 29, 2009.
