= Julian Jenkins =

American gridiron football player (born 1983)

No. 91
- Position: Defensive end

Personal information
- Born: October 25, 1983 (age 43); Boston, Massachusetts, U.S.
- Listed height: 6 ft 3 in (1.91 m)
- Listed weight: 277 lb (126 kg)

Career information
- High school: Woodward Academy (College Park, Georgia)
- College: Stanford
- NFL draft: 2006: 5th round, 156th overall pick

Career history
- Tampa Bay Buccaneers (2006); Denver Broncos (2008)*; Calgary Stampeders (2008)
- * Offseason or practice squad member only

Awards and highlights
- Grey Cup champion (2008)
- Stats at Pro Football Reference
- Stats at CFL.ca (archive)

Julian Jenkins (born October 25, 1983) is an American former professional football defensive end. He was selected by the Tampa Bay Buccaneers in the fifth round of the 2006 NFL draft with the 156th overall pick. He attended Woodward Academy in College Park, Georgia, where he was a three-sport athlete in football, basketball and track and field. Jenkins played both defensive end and defensive tackle in college at Stanford University. Jenkins helped the Calgary Stampeders win the 2008 Grey Cup. His father, Eddie Jenkins, was a former professional football player for the 1972 Miami Dolphins.

Pre-draft measurables
Height	Weight	Arm length	Hand span	40-yard dash	10-yard split	20-yard split	20-yard shuttle	Three-cone drill	Vertical jump	Broad jump	Bench press
6 ft 3 5/8 in (1.92 m)	277 lb (126 kg)	32 1/4 in (0.82 m)	9 1/2 in (0.24 m)	4.95 s	1.68 s	2.88 s	4.23 s	7.11 s	34.5 in (0.88 m)	9 ft 2 in (2.79 m)	25 reps
All values from NFL Combine/Pro Day
