= Everett Little =

American football player (1954–2022)

No. 72, 77
- Position: Offensive guard

Personal information
- Born: June 12, 1954; Lufkin, Texas, U.S.
- Died: December 12, 2022 (aged 68)
- Listed height: 6 ft 4 in (1.93 m)
- Listed weight: 265 lb (120 kg)

Career information
- High school: Lufkin (TX)
- College: Houston
- NFL draft: 1976: 4th round, 124th overall pick

Career history
- Tampa Bay Buccaneers (1976)

Career NFL statistics
- Games played: 10
- Games started: 1
- Stats at Pro Football Reference

Everett Charles Little (June 12, 1954 – December 12, 2022) was a former National Football League (NFL) offensive guard who played for the Tampa Bay Buccaneers in 1976. He attended Lufkin High School and then the University of Houston before being taken by the Buccaneers in the 4th round, 124th overall, in the 1976 NFL draft.
