= Kelvin Atkins =

American football player (born 1960)

No. 51, 55
- Position: Linebacker

Personal information
- Born: July 3, 1960 (age 66); Orlando, Florida, U.S.
- Listed height: 6 ft 3 in (1.91 m)
- Listed weight: 235 lb (107 kg)

Career information
- High school: Evans (Orlando)
- College: Illinois (1978–1981)
- NFL draft: 1982: 8th round, 212th overall pick

Career history
- Tampa Bay Buccaneers (1982); Chicago Bears (1983); Chicago Blitz (1985)*; Denver Gold (1985)*; Orlando Renegades (1985)
- * Offseason or practice squad member only
- Stats at Pro Football Reference

Kelvin Lamar Atkins (born July 3, 1960) is an American former professional football player who was a linebacker for one season with the Chicago Bears of the National Football League (NFL). He played college football for the Illinois Fighting Illini and was selected by the Tampa Bay Buccaneers in the eighth round of the 1982 NFL draft. He also played for the Orlando Renegades of the United States Football League (USFL).

== Early life and college ==
Kelvin Lamar Atkins was born on July 3, 1960, in Orlando, Florida. He attended Maynard Evans High School in Orlando.

Atkins was a member of the Illinois Fighting Illini from 1978 to 1981 and a three-year letterman from 1979 to 1981. He recorded one interception in 1979 and two interceptions in 1981.

== Professional career ==
Atkins was selected by the Tampa Bay Buccaneers in the eighth round, with the 212th overall pick, of the 1982 NFL draft. In regards to joining the Buccaneers, Atkins stated that "The Bucs were my favorite team from their start, even when they were losing all those games" and "That's why it's such a thrill to be here. I was afraid I was going to Pittsburgh." He was placed on injured reserve on August 31, 1982, and spent the entire season there. He was released by the Buccaneers on August 29, 1983.

Atkins signed with the Chicago Bears on September 20, 1983. He played in 13 games for the Bears during the 1983 season. He was released on August 21, 1984.

Atkins was signed by the Chicago Blitz of the United States Football League (USFL) on October 15, 1984. The Blitz folded soon after. On December 5, 1984, Atkins signed with the Denver Gold of the USFL. However, he was waived by the Gold on January 21, 1985. He was claimed off waivers by the USFL's Orlando Renegades the next day. He recorded two sacks, one interception, and one fumble recovery for the Renegades during the 1985 USFL season. Atkins became a free agent after the 1986 USFL season was cancelled.
