= Jesse Anderson (American football) =

American football player (born 1966)

No. 88, 89, 81
- Position: Tight end

Personal information
- Born: July 26, 1966 (age 60); West Point, Mississippi, U.S.
- Listed height: 6 ft 2 in (1.88 m)
- Listed weight: 245 lb (111 kg)

Career information
- High school: West Point
- College: Mississippi State
- NFL draft: 1990: 4th round, 87th overall pick

Career history
- Tampa Bay Buccaneers (1990–1992); Pittsburgh Steelers (1992); Green Bay Packers (1993); New Orleans Saints (1993)

Awards and highlights
- Second-team All-SEC (1989)

Career NFL statistics
- Receptions: 11
- Receiving yards: 150
- Touchdowns: 2
- Stats at Pro Football Reference

Jesse Lemond Anderson (born July 26, 1966) is an American former professional football player who was a tight end in the National Football League (NFL). He played college football for the Mississippi State Bulldogs. He was selected by the Tampa Bay Buccaneers in the fourth round of the 1990 NFL draft with the 87th overall pick. He and subsequently spent time with the Pittsburgh Steelers, the Green Bay Packers, and the New Orleans Saints before retiring in 1993.
