= Reggie Rusk =

American football player (born 1972)

No. 28, 26, 21, 25
- Position: Cornerback

Personal information
- Born: October 19, 1972 (age 54); Galveston, Texas, U.S.
- Listed height: 6 ft 0 in (1.83 m)
- Listed weight: 190 lb (86 kg)

Career information
- High school: Texas City (TX)
- College: Kentucky
- NFL draft: 1996: 7th round, 221st overall pick

Career history
- Tampa Bay Buccaneers (1996–1997); Seattle Seahawks (1997-1998); San Diego Chargers (1998-2000)

Awards and highlights
- Second-team All-SEC (1995)

Career NFL statistics
- Tackles: 38
- Sacks: 1
- Fumble recoveries: 1
- Stats at Pro Football Reference

Reginald Leon Rusk (born October 19, 1972) is an American former professional football player who was a cornerback in the National Football League (NFL). He played college football for the Kentucky Wildcats and was selected by the Tampa Bay Buccaneers in the seventh round of the 1996 NFL draft with the 221st overall pick. He played six seasons for the Buccaneers (1996–1997), Seattle Seahawks (1997–1998), and San Diego Chargers (1999–2001).
