= Henry Rolling =

American football player (born 1965)

No. 55, 57, 59
- Position: Linebacker

Personal information
- Born: September 8, 1965 (age 61); Fort Eustis, Virginia, U.S.
- Listed height: 6 ft 2 in (1.88 m)
- Listed weight: 225 lb (102 kg)

Career information
- High school: Basic (Henderson, Nevada)
- College: Nevada
- NFL draft: 1987: 5th round, 135th overall pick

Career history
- Tampa Bay Buccaneers (1987–1989); San Diego Chargers (1990–1992); Los Angeles Rams (1993–1994)

Career NFL statistics
- Tackles: 229
- Sacks: 6.5
- Interceptions: 5
- Stats at Pro Football Reference

Henry Lee Rolling (born September 8, 1965) is an American former professional football player who was a linebacker in the National Football League (NFL).

Pre-draft measurables
| Height | Weight | Arm length | Hand span | 40-yard dash | 10-yard split | 20-yard split | 20-yard shuttle | Vertical jump | Broad jump | Bench press |
|---|---|---|---|---|---|---|---|---|---|---|
| 6 ft 1 1/2 in (1.87 m) | 211 lb (96 kg) | 32 in (0.81 m) | 9 in (0.23 m) | 4.64 s | 1.57 s | 2.64 s | 4.42 s | 36.5 in (0.93 m) | 9 ft 11 in (3.02 m) | 20 reps |
All values from NFL Combine

He was selected by the Tampa Bay Buccaneers in the fifth round of the 1987 NFL draft. He played college football for the Nevada Wolf Pack. Rolling also played for the San Diego Chargers and Los Angeles Rams.

Rolling's son, Josh was a three-sport athlete at Bishop Manogue High School.
