= Rogerick Green =

American football player (born 1969)

No. 26
- Position: Cornerback

Personal information
- Born: December 15, 1969 (age 56); San Antonio, Texas, U.S.
- Listed height: 6 ft 0 in (1.83 m)
- Listed weight: 182 lb (83 kg)

Career information
- High school: San Antonio (TX) West Campus
- College: Kansas State
- NFL draft: 1992: 5th round, 118th overall pick
- Expansion draft: 1995: 31st round, 61st overall pick

Career history
- Tampa Bay Buccaneers (1992–1994); Jacksonville Jaguars (1995); Kansas City Chiefs (1996)*; Barcelona Dragons (1997); Nashville Kats (1998)
- * Offseason or practice squad member only

Career NFL statistics
- Tackles: 11
- Stats at Pro Football Reference

Career AFL statistics
- Tackles: 39
- Forced fumbles: 1
- Passes defended: 4
- Stats at ArenaFan.com

Rogerick Green (born December 15, 1969) is an American former professional football player who was a defensive back in the National Football League (NFL). He played for the Tampa Bay Buccaneers in 1992 and 1994 and for the Jacksonville Jaguars in 1995. He was selected by Tampa Bay in the fifth round of the 1992 NFL draft with the 118th overall pick.
