= Jerry Bell (American football) =

American football player (born 1959)

No. 82
- Position: Tight end

Personal information
- Born: March 7, 1959 (age 67); Derby, Connecticut, U.S.
- Listed height: 6 ft 5 in (1.96 m)
- Listed weight: 230 lb (104 kg)

Career information
- High school: El Cerrito (CA)
- College: Arizona State
- NFL draft: 1982: 3rd round, 74th overall pick

Career history
- Tampa Bay Buccaneers (1982–1986)

Career NFL statistics
- Games played: 60
- Receptions: 101
- Receiving yards: 1,218
- Touchdowns: 7
- Stats at Pro Football Reference

Gerard Alfred "Jerry" Bell (born March 7, 1959) is an American former professional football player who was a tight end in the National Football League (NFL). He was selected by the Tampa Bay Buccaneers in the third round of the 1982 NFL draft. He played college football for the Arizona State Sun Devils. He graduated from El Cerrito High School, El Cerrito, CA, in 1977.

After his playing career, Bell worked in technology sales at IBM, General Electric, and Oracle. He is engaged in philanthropy, providing financial assistance to students at Arizona State University and University of South Florida.
