= Michael Morton (running back) =

American football player (born 1960)

No. 1, 20, 36
- Positions: Running back, return specialist

Personal information
- Born: February 6, 1960 (age 66); Birmingham, Alabama, U.S.
- Listed height: 5 ft 8 in (1.73 m)
- Listed weight: 180 lb (82 kg)

Career information
- High school: Inglewood (Inglewood, California)
- College: UNLV
- NFL draft: 1982: 12th round, 325th overall pick

Career history
- Tampa Bay Buccaneers (1982–1984); Washington Redskins (1985); Seattle Seahawks (1987)

Career NFL statistics
- Rushing yards: 110
- Rushing average: 2.2
- Touchdowns: 1
- Stats at Pro Football Reference

Michael Da'mond Morton (born February 6, 1960) is an American former professional football player who was a running back in the National Football League (NFL) for the Tampa Bay Buccaneers, Washington Redskins, and Seattle Seahawks. He played college football for the UNLV Rebels.
