= Jim Leonard (American football, born 1957) =

American football player (born 1957)

No. 62, 57, 63
- Positions: Center, Guard

Personal information
- Born: October 19, 1957 (age 69); Santa Cruz, California, U.S.
- Listed height: 6 ft 3 in (1.91 m)
- Listed weight: 258 lb (117 kg)

Career information
- High school: Harbor (Santa Cruz, California)
- College: Santa Clara
- NFL draft: 1980: 7th round, 186th overall pick

Career history
- Tampa Bay Buccaneers (1980–1983); San Francisco 49ers (1985); San Diego Chargers (1985–1986)
- Stats at Pro Football Reference

James Francis Leonard (born October 19, 1957) is an American former professional football player who was a center and guard for the Tampa Bay Buccaneers, San Francisco 49ers and San Diego Chargers of the National Football League (NFL). He played college football for the Santa Clara Broncos.
