= Tom Morris (American football) =

American football player (born 1960)

No. 24
- Position: Defensive back

Personal information
- Born: April 2, 1960 (age 66); Anniston, Alabama, U.S.
- Listed height: 5 ft 11 in (1.80 m)
- Listed weight: 175 lb (79 kg)

Career information
- High school: Millikan (Long Beach, California)
- College: Michigan State
- NFL draft: 1982: 7th round, 185th overall pick

Career history
- Tampa Bay Buccaneers (1982–1983); Indianapolis Colts (1984)*; Oakland Invaders (1985)*; Detroit Lions (1985)*
- * Offseason or practice squad member only
- Stats at Pro Football Reference

Thomas Lewis Morris (born April 2, 1960) is an American former professional football defensive back who played for the Tampa Bay Buccaneers of the National Football League (NFL). He played college football for the Michigan State Spartans and was selected by the Buccaneers in the seventh round of the 1982 NFL draft.

== Early life ==
Thomas Lewis Morris was born on April 2, 1960, in Anniston, Alabama. He played high school football at Millikan High School in Long Beach, California. He acquired the nickname "T-Bone" during his junior year of high school.

== College career ==
Morris played junior college football at Cypress Junior College in 1978 and Golden West College in 1979. He transferred to Michigan State University, where he was a two-year letterman at free safety for the Spartans from 1980 to 1981.

== Professional career ==
Morris was selected by the Tampa Bay Buccaneers in the seventh round, with the 185th overall pick, of the 1982 NFL draft. He played in eight games for the Buccaneers as a reserve safety during the 1982 season. He also appeared in one playoff game. On October 9, 1983, against the Dallas Cowboys, Morris committed a running-into-the-kicker penalty that gave Cowboys kicker Rafael Septién a second (this time successful) chance to kick the game-winning field goal. The Cowboys won 27–24 in overtime. Morris was placed on injured reserve on October 14, 1983, and was activated on November 11, 1983. He played in 12 games overall as a backup cornerback/safety in 1983 and recovered one fumble. He was waived on August 20, 1984, after the fourth of five preseason games.

Morris was claimed off waivers by the Indianapolis Colts on August 21, 1984. He was released on August 31, 1984, after the fourth (of four) preseason games.

On September 5, 1984, Morris signed with the Oakland Invaders for the 1984 USFL season. He was released on February 18, 1985, before the start of the regular season.

Morris was signed by the Detroit Lions on May 9, 1985. He was released on August 19 after the second game of the 1985 preseason.

== Personal life ==
Morris' brother, Randall, also played in the NFL.
