= Dave Barrett (American football) =

American football player (born 1959)

No. 30
- Position: Running back

Personal information
- Born: September 9, 1959 (age 67); Corpus Christi, Texas, U.S.
- Listed height: 6 ft 0 in (1.83 m)
- Listed weight: 230 lb (104 kg)

Career information
- High school: Roy Miller (Corpus Christi)
- College: Houston (1978–1981)
- NFL draft: 1982: 4th round, 103rd overall pick

Career history
- Tampa Bay Buccaneers (1982–1984)

Career NFL statistics
- Games played: 7
- Stats at Pro Football Reference

David Earl Barrett (born September 9, 1959) is an American former professional football player who was a running back for the Tampa Bay Buccaneers of the National Football League (NFL). He played college football for the Houston Cougars.

== Early life ==
Barrett was born on September 9, 1959, in Corpus Christi, Texas. He attended Roy Miller High School in Corpus Christi.

== College career ==
Barrett played college football for the Houston Cougars from 1978 to 1981 and was a four-year letterman. In four seasons, he rushed for 1,402 yards and 13 touchdowns with 11 receptions for 86 yards.

== Professional career ==
Barrett was selected in the fourth round, with the 103rd overall selection, by the Tampa Bay Buccaneers in the 1982 NFL draft. He made the active roster and played in seven games during his rookie season. On December 23, Barrett was placed on the injured reserve. On August 9, 1983, he was again placed on the injured reserve with a knee injury. On July 5, 1984, Barrett was released by the Buccaneers.
