= Andre Tyler =

American football player (born 1959)

No. 81
- Position: Wide receiver

Personal information
- Born: July 17, 1959 (age 67); Tucson, Arizona, U.S.
- Listed height: 6 ft 0 in (1.83 m)
- Listed weight: 180 lb (82 kg)

Career information
- High school: Long Beach Polytechnic (Long Beach, California)
- College: Stanford (1977–1981)
- NFL draft: 1982: 6th round, 158th overall pick

Career history
- Tampa Bay Buccaneers (1982–1984)

Awards and highlights
- First-team All-Pac-10 (1980)

Career NFL statistics
- Games played: 14
- Receptions: 6
- Receiving yards: 77
- Return yards: 208
- Stats at Pro Football Reference

Andre Miguel Tyler (born July 17, 1959) is an American former professional football wide receiver who played in the National Football League (NFL) with the Tampa Bay Buccaneers. He played college football for the Stanford Cardinal.

== Early life ==
Tyler was born on July 17, 1959, in Tucson, Arizona. He attended and played football at Long Beach Polytechnic High School in Long Beach, California. In his senior year, Tyler had 28 receptions for 513 yards and five touchdowns. He also competed in the high jump. Tyler committed to play college football for the Stanford Cardinal on National Signing Day. He was noted by scouts to have great speed, hands and route running.

== College career ==
Tyler played college football for the Stanford Cardinal from 1977 to 1981. He had his best statistical season in 1980, where he led the Pac-10 in receiving yards (737) and tied for first in receptions (53). Tyler was named to the 1980 first-team All-Pac-10 team. He missed the entire 1981 season due to a stress fracture in his foot suffered in preseason practice. In 33 games, Tyler had 107 catches for 1,548 yards and 14 touchdowns.

== Professional career ==
Tyler was selected in the sixth round, with the 158th overall selection, by the Tampa Bay Buccaneers in the 1982 NFL draft. He did not appear in any game in 1982 and made his debut the following season in the opening contest against the Detroit Lions, where he returned three punts for 21 yards.

In a close overtime loss to the Minnesota Vikings, Tyler was pressed into service as the holder. With 7:35 remaining in overtime, kicker Bill Capece missed a potential game-winning 33-yard field goal. In 14 games, he caught six passes for 77 yards and also had 208 punt return yards. Tyler missed two games with a groin injury.

On August 13, 1984, the Buccaneers placed Tyler on the injured reserve. He became a free agent after the 1984 season.
