= 1992 Tampa Bay Buccaneers season =

NFL team season

- Owner: Hugh Culverhouse
- Head coach: Sam Wyche
- Home stadium: Tampa Stadium

Results
- Record: 5–11
- Division place: 3rd in NFC Central
- Playoffs: Did not qualify
- All-Pros: LT Paul Gruber (2nd team)
- Team MVP: RB Reggie Cobb

The 1992 Tampa Bay Buccaneers season was the franchise's seventeenth season in the National Football League (NFL). It was the first season of Sam Wyche's four-year spell as the Buccaneers' head coach. Wyche said before the season that he believed he could turn Vinny Testaverde into a great player.

Tampa Bay had lop-sided wins in the first two weeks, and looked like they would prove good the coach's words. They started the season 3–1 but then lost ten of the next eleven, starting with a ten-point loss to the Indianapolis Colts. Tampa's closest loss of the year was a four-point Week Thirteen loss to the Los Angeles Rams. Tampa Bay had a first half 27–3 lead, but the Rams scored 28 unanswered points to steal the win in what was the Bucs' only national television appearance (on ESPN Sunday Night Football). Coincidentally, there would be a playoff game in 2022 where the Buccaneers trailed the Los Angeles Rams, 27–3, and tied the game up with 24 unanswered points, only to lose, 30–27.

Special teams suffered too, especially from kickers such as Ken Willis making only eight of fourteen field goals. Reggie Cobb became only the third player in the team's history to rush for 1,000 yards in a season and Santana Dotson made the All-Rookie team. The Bucs finished the season the way they started it, with a win over the Phoenix Cardinals.

Statistics site Football Outsiders calculates that the 1992 Buccaneers had the worst special teams squad of the year, and fourth-worst all time (Note: through 2011) (later having been recalibrated to seventh-worst all-time): "Tampa Bay actually got a solid year from punter Dan Stryzinski, but the return men were poor, the kickers were horrific, and the kick coverage was putrid. Ken Willis and Eddie Murray combined to go 12-for-22 on field goals, and they couldn't stop kicking the ball out of bounds. Willis kicked the first nine games of the season and hit it out of bounds five times. [...] Murray took over for the final seven games and didn't have a single touchback, while hitting it out of bounds three more times. He averaged only 55.5 yards per kickoff. The Bucs weren't the only other team with a single-digit touchback total, but at least the others – New England, Green Bay, and the New York Giants – had the excuse of playing in cold weather."

== NFL draft ==
Pick	Round	Player	Position	School
44	Round 2	Courtney Hawkins	Wide Receiver	Michigan State
59	Round 3	Mark Wheeler	Defensive Tackle	Texas A&M
79	Round 3	Tyji Armstrong	Tight End	Ole Miss
86	Round 4	Craig Erickson	Quarterback	Miami (FL)
118	Round 5	Rogerick Green	Defensive Back	Kansas State
132	Round 5	Santana Dotson	Defensive End	Baylor
148	Round 6	James Malone	Linebacker	UCLA
184	Round 7	Ken Swilling	Defensive Back	Georgia Tech
200	Round 8	Anthony McDowell	Running Back	Texas Tech
222	Round 8	Mike Pawlawski	Quarterback	California
254	Round 10	Elijah Alexander	Linebacker	Kansas State
284	Round 11	Mazio Royster	Running Back	USC
311	Round 12	Klaus Wilmsmeyer	Punter	Louisville

The Buccaneers' first-round pick had previously been traded to the Indianapolis Colts in return for quarterback Chris Chandler, and was eventually used to select Quentin Coryatt.

== Personnel ==
=== Staff ===
1992 Tampa Bay Buccaneers staff
Front office: Owner – Hugh Culverhouse; President – Gay Culverhouse; Vice president of football administration – Rich McKay; Director of player personnel – Jerry Angelo; Director of college scouting – Tim Ruskell; Head coaches: Head coach/director of football operations – Sam Wyche; Offensive coaches: Quarterbacks – Turk Schonert; Running backs – Willie Peete; Wide receivers – Harold Jackson; Offensive line – Bob Wylie	Defensive coaches: Defensive coordinator – Floyd Peters; Defensive line – Eddie Khayat; Linebackers – Maxie Baughan; Defensive backs – Steve Shafer; Defensive assistant – Jeff FitzGerald; Special teams coaches: Special teams/tight ends – George Stewart; Strength and conditioning: Strength and conditioning – Ray Oliver; Strength and conditioning assistant – Dennis Green

=== Roster ===
1992 Tampa Bay Buccaneers roster
Quarterbacks (QB): 17 Steve DeBerg; 7 Craig Erickson; 9 Mike Pawlawski; 14 Vinny Testaverde; Running backs (RB): 40 Gary Anderson; 34 Reggie Cobb; 37 Anthony McDowell; 33 Mazio Royster; Wide receivers (WR): 88 Mark Carrier; 80 Lawrence Dawsey; 85 Courtney Hawkins PR; 87 George Thomas; 84 Charles Wilson; Tight ends (TE): 86 Tyji Armstrong; 89 Todd Harrison; 83 Dave Moore	Offensive linemen (OL): 62 Ian Beckles G; 76 Scott Dill T; 74 Paul Gruber T; 61 Tony Mayberry C; 73 Tom McHale G; 70 Charles McRae T; 66 Bruce Reimers G; 64 Tim Ryan G; 67 Mike Sullivan G; Defensive linemen (DL): 71 Santana Dotson DT; 95 Mark Duckens DE; 91 Rhett Hall DT; 78 Corey Mayfield DT; 52 Keith McCants DE; 77 Mark Wheeler DT	Linebackers (LB): 59 Elijah Alexander OLB; 55 Darrick Brownlow MLB; 51 Broderick Thomas OLB; 54 Jimmy Williams OLB; Defensive backs (DB): 44 Darren Anderson CB; 23 Marty Carter SS; 27 Darrell Fullington FS; 24 Roger Jones CB; 41 Joe King FS; 22 Garry Lewis CB; 21 Milton Mack CB; 31 Darryl Pollard CB; 29 Ricky Reynolds CB; Special teams (ST): 53 Ed Brady LS; 3 Eddie Murray K; 4 Dan Stryzinski P	Practice squad: 81 Willie Culpepper WR; —- Dean Kirkland G; Reserve: -- Michael Barber WR (IR); 56 Reggie Burnette LB (IR); 57 Al Chamblee LB (IR); 25 Tony Covington S (IR); 26 Rogerick Green CB (IR); 60 Randy Grimes C (IR); 82 Ron Hall TE (IR); 98 Ray Seals DE (IR); 72 Rob Taylor T (IR); 58 Calvin Tiggle LB (IR); Rookies in italics 47 active, 10 reserve, 2 practice squad

== Regular season ==
=== Schedule ===
Regular season
Week	Date	Opponent	Result	Game site	Record	Attendance
1	September 6	Phoenix Cardinals	**W** 23–7	Tampa Stadium	1–0	41,315
2	September 13	**Green Bay Packers**	**W** 31–3	Tampa Stadium	2–0	50,051
3	September 20	at **Minnesota Vikings**	**L** 26–20	Hubert H. Humphrey Metrodome	2–1	48,113
4	September 27	at **Detroit Lions**	**W** 27–23	Pontiac Silverdome	3–1	51,374
5	October 4	Indianapolis Colts	**L** 24–14	Tampa Stadium	3–2	56,585
6	Bye					
7	October 18	at **Chicago Bears**	**L** 31–14	Soldier Field	3–3	61,412
8	October 25	**Detroit Lions**	**L** 38–7	Tampa Stadium	3–4	53,995
9	November 1	at New Orleans Saints	**L** 23–21	Louisiana Superdome	3–5	68,591
10	November 8	**Minnesota Vikings**	**L** 35–7	Tampa Stadium	3–6	49,095
11	November 15	**Chicago Bears**	**W** 20–17	Tampa Stadium	4–6	69,102
12	November 22	at San Diego Chargers	**L** 29–14	Jack Murphy Stadium	4–7	43,197
13	November 29	at **Green Bay Packers**	**L** 19–14	Milwaukee County Stadium	4–8	52,347
14	December 6	Los Angeles Rams	**L** 31–27	Tampa Stadium	4–9	38,387
15	December 13	Atlanta Falcons	**L** 35–7	Tampa Stadium	4–10	39,056
16	December 19	at San Francisco 49ers	**L** 21–14	Candlestick Park	4–11	60,519
17	December 27	at Phoenix Cardinals	**W** 7–3	Sun Devil Stadium	5–11	29,645
Notes: Division opponents in **bold** text

=== Standings ===
NFC Central
	W	L	T	PCT	DIV	CONF	PF	PA	STK
^{(3)} Minnesota Vikings	11	5	0	.688	7–1	8–4	374	249	W2
Green Bay Packers	9	7	0	.563	4–4	6–6	276	296	L1
Tampa Bay Buccaneers	5	11	0	.313	3–5	5–9	267	365	W1
Chicago Bears	5	11	0	.313	3–5	4–8	295	361	L2
Detroit Lions	5	11	0	.313	3–5	3–9	273	332	L1
