= 1993 Tampa Bay Buccaneers season =

NFL team season

- Owner: Hugh Culverhouse
- General manager: Rich McKay
- Head coach: Sam Wyche
- Defensive coordinator: Floyd Peters
- Home stadium: Tampa Stadium

Results
- Record: 5–11
- Division place: 5th NFC Central
- Playoffs: Did not qualify
- All-Pros: MLB Hardy Nickerson
- Pro Bowlers: MLB Hardy Nickerson
- Team MVP: MLB Hardy Nickerson

The 1993 Tampa Bay Buccaneers season was the franchise's 18th season in the National Football League (NFL). The Buccaneers wore the initial Mr. C on the right side of the sleeve ends of the jerseys in honor of their owner Hugh Culverhouse who was battling cancer who then died after the 1993 season.

1993 was mostly seen as a rebuilding year for coach Sam Wyche who moved on without Vinny Testaverde and went with young quarterback Craig Erickson, another University of Miami alumnus who won a national championship as their quarterback. He had a solid 3,054 passing yards. The Buccaneers lost five of their first six games on the way to a 5–11 season.

The 1993 Buccaneers have the distinction of being the only team in NFL history to have played eleven games against teams that would go on to make the playoffs; (Note: Tampa Bay played Detroit, Minnesota and Green Bay twice each, as well as the Giants, 49ers, Chiefs, Raiders and Broncos) the Buccaneers were 3–8 in these games.

In his first season with the team, Hardy Nickerson set an NFL record with 214 tackles.

== Offseason ==
=== NFL draft ===
Prior to the season they drafted John Lynch who would become one of the most popular players of all time in Tampa.

Pick	Round	Player	Position	School
6	Round 1	Eric Curry	Defensive End	Alabama
34	Round 2	Demetrius DuBose	Linebacker	Notre Dame
60	Round 3	Lamar Thomas	Wide Receiver	Miami
82	Round 3	John Lynch	Defensive Back	Stanford
91	Round 4	Rudy Harris	Running Back	Clemson
104	Round 4	Horace Copeland	Wide Receiver	Miami
145	Round 6	Chidi Ahanotu	Defensive Tackle	California
176	Round 7	Tyree Davis	Wide Receiver	Central Arkansas
220	Round 8	Darrick Branch	Wide Receiver	Hawaii
224	Round 8	Daron Alcorn	Kicker	Akron

Daron Alcorn was the last player selected in the draft, commonly referred to as "Mr. Irrelevant".

== Personnel ==
=== Staff ===
1993 Tampa Bay Buccaneers staff
Front office: Owner – Hugh Culverhouse; President – Gay Culverhouse; Vice president of football administration – Rich McKay; Director of player personnel – Jerry Angelo; Director of college scouting – Tim Ruskell; Head coaches: Head coach/director of football operations – Sam Wyche; Offensive coaches: Quarterbacks – Turk Schonert; Running backs – Willie Peete; Wide receivers – Harold Jackson; Offensive line – Bob Wylie; Offensive assistant – Jeff FitzGerald	Defensive coaches: Defensive coordinator – Floyd Peters; Defensive line – Eddie Khayat; Linebackers – Maxie Baughan; Defensive backs – Steve Shafer; Defensive assistant – Jeff FitzGerald; Special teams coaches: Special teams/tight ends – George Stewart; Strength and conditioning: Strength and conditioning – Brad Roll

=== Roster ===
1993 Tampa Bay Buccaneers roster
Quarterbacks (QB): 7 Craig Erickson; 13 Mark Vlasic; 11 Casey Weldon; Running backs (RB): 34 Reggie Cobb; 43 Rudy Harris FB; 33 Mazio Royster; 45 Vernon Turner; 46 Vince Workman; Wide receivers (WR): 89 Shawn Collins; 88 Horace Copeland; 85 Courtney Hawkins PR; 87 Lamar Thomas; 84 Charles Wilson KR; Tight ends (TE): 86 Tyji Armstrong; 82 Ron Hall; 83 Dave Moore	Offensive linemen (OL): 76 Scott Dill T; 74 Paul Gruber T; 79 Sean Love G; 61 Tony Mayberry C; 70 Charles McRae G; 66 Bruce Reimers G; 67 Mike Sullivan G; 72 Rob Taylor T; Defensive linemen (DL): 90 Chidi Ahanotu DE/DT; 75 Eric Curry DE; 71 Santana Dotson DT; 91 Rhett Hall DT; 92 Shawn Price DE; 98 Ray Seals DE; 77 Mark Wheeler DT; 96 Bernard Wilson DT	Linebackers (LB): 55 Darrick Brownlow MLB; 50 Reggie Burnette OLB; 93 Demetrius DuBose OLB; 56 Hardy Nickerson MLB; 51 Broderick Thomas OLB; 59 Jimmy Williams OLB; Defensive backs (DB): 44 Darren Anderson CB; 28 Curtis Buckley CB/S; 27 Barney Bussey LB/S; 23 Marty Carter SS; 20 Jerry Gray FS; 24 Roger Jones CB; 41 Joe King FS; 47 John Lynch SS; 21 Milton Mack CB; 35 Martin Mayhew CB; 36 Markus Paul SS; 29 Ricky Reynolds CB; Special teams (ST): 53 Ed Brady LS; 5 Michael Husted K; 4 Dan Stryzinski P	Practice squad: 81 Tyree Davis WR (PS/I); Reserve: 73 Theo Adams T (IR); 62 Ian Beckles G (IR); 25 Tony Covington S (IR); 80 Lawrence Dawsey WR (IR); 26 Rogerick Green CB (IR); 37 Anthony McDowell FB (IR); 31 Darryl Pollard CB/S (IR); 64 Tim Ryan G (IR); 94 Rick Trumbull T (IR); Rookies in italics 53 active, 10 reserve

== Regular season ==
=== Schedule ===
**Regular season**
Week	Date	Opponent	Result	Game site	Attendance	Record
1	September 5	Kansas City Chiefs	L 27–3	Tampa Stadium	63,378*	0–1
2	September 12	at New York Giants	L 23–7	Giants Stadium	75,891	0–2
3	Bye					
4	September 26	at **Chicago Bears**	L 47–17	Soldier Field	58,329	0–3
5	October 3	**Detroit Lions**	W 27–10	Tampa Stadium	40,794*	1–3
6	October 10	at **Minnesota Vikings**	L 15–0	Hubert H. Humphrey Metrodome	54,215	1–4
7	Bye					
8	October 24	**Green Bay Packers**	L 37–14	Tampa Stadium	47,354*	1–5
9	October 31	at Atlanta Falcons	W 31–24	Georgia Dome	50,647	2–5
10	November 7	at **Detroit Lions**	L 23–0	Pontiac Silverdome	65,295	2–6
11	November 14	San Francisco 49ers	L 45–21	Tampa Stadium	43,835*	2–7
12	November 21	**Minnesota Vikings**	W 23–10	Tampa Stadium	40,848*	3–7
13	November 28	at **Green Bay Packers**	L 13–10	Lambeau Field	56,995	3–8
14	December 5	Washington Redskins	L 23–17	Tampa Stadium	49,035*	3–9
15	December 12	**Chicago Bears**	W 13–10	Tampa Stadium	56,667*	4–9
16	December 19	at Los Angeles Raiders	L 27–20	Los Angeles Memorial Coliseum	40,532	4–10
17	December 26	at Denver Broncos	W 17–10	Mile High Stadium	73,434	5–10
18	January 2	San Diego Chargers	L 32–17	Tampa Stadium	35,587*	5–11
Notes: Division opponents are in bold text
* = blacked out locally

== Standings ==
NFC Central
	W	L	T	PCT	PF	PA	STK
^{(3)} Detroit Lions	10	6	0	.625	298	292	W2
^{(5)} Minnesota Vikings	9	7	0	.563	277	290	W3
^{(6)} Green Bay Packers	9	7	0	.563	340	282	L1
Chicago Bears	7	9	0	.438	234	230	L4
Tampa Bay Buccaneers	5	11	0	.313	237	376	L1
