= 1991 Tampa Bay Buccaneers season =

NFL team season

- Owner: Hugh Culverhouse
- General manager: Phil Krueger
- Head coach: Richard Williamson
- Home stadium: Tampa Stadium

Results
- Record: 3–13
- Division place: 5th NFC Central
- Playoffs: Did not qualify
- Team MVP: LB Broderick Thomas

The 1991 Tampa Bay Buccaneers season was the franchise's 16th season in the National Football League.

In Richard Williamson's only full season as coach, the Buccaneers started by losing their first five games, on the way to another last place 3–13 season. Among the major disappointments was quarterback Vinny Testaverde, who was replaced by Chris Chandler at quarterback early in the season, who passed for 1,994 yards and eight touchdown passes to 15 interceptions. Following the season Williamson was fired and replaced by Sam Wyche.

Tax records would later show that the Buccaneers were one of the most profitable teams during this time, even though owner Hugh Culverhouse announced the Bucs were losing money and needed to play games in Orlando, Florida to get income. Such records revealed Culverhouse ran the Bucs as a profit first business, often releasing better players who would deserve big contracts, the most notable being quarterback Doug Williams in the early 1980s.

== Offseason ==
=== NFL draft ===
1991 Tampa Bay Buccaneers draft
Round	Pick	Player	Position	College	Notes
1	7	Charles McRae	OT	Tennessee	
3	66	Lawrence Dawsey	WR	Florida State	
3	80	Robert Wilson	RB	Texas A&M	
4	93	Tony Covington	DB	Virginia	
5	120	Terry Bagsby	LB	East Texas State	
5	136	Tim Ryan	OG	Notre Dame	
6	147	Rhett Hall	DT	California	
7	174	Calvin Tiggle	LB	Georgia Tech	
8	207	Marty Carter	DB	Middle Tennessee St	
9	233	Treamelle Taylor	WR	Nevada	
10	260	Pat O'Hara	QB	USC	
10	265	Hyland Hickson	RB	Michigan State	
11	287	Mike Sunvold	DT	Minnesota	
12	314	Al Chamblee	LB	Virginia Tech	
Made roster † Pro Football Hall of Fame * Made at least one Pro Bowl during career

== Personnel ==
=== Staff ===
1991 Tampa Bay Buccaneers staff
Front office: Owner – Hugh Culverhouse; President – Gay Culverhouse; general manager – Phil Krueger; Director of player personnel – Jerry Angelo; Head coaches: Head coach – Richard Williamson; Offensive coaches: Offensive coordinator/running backs – Hank Kuhlmann; Quarterbacks – Morris Watts; Receivers – Tim Harkness; Offensive line – Carl Mauck; Offensive assistant – Tom Schertz	Defensive coaches: Defensive coordinator/defensive line – Floyd Peters; Defensive line assistant – Ray Hamilton; Linebackers – Dale Lindsey; Defensive backs – Steve Shafer; Defensive assistant – Jeff FitzGerald; Defensive assistant – Richard Wood; Special teams coaches: Special teams/tight ends – Alan Lowry; Strength and conditioning: Strength and conditioning – Kent Johnston

=== Roster ===
1991 Tampa Bay Buccaneers roster
Quarterbacks (QB): 7 Jeff Carlson; 4 Pat O'Hara; 14 Vinny Testaverde; Running backs (RB): 40 Gary Anderson KR; 34 Reggie Cobb; 36 Robert Hardy; 32 Alonzo Highsmith; 20 Robert Wilson FB; Wide receivers (WR): 88 Mark Carrier; 80 Lawrence Dawsey; 87 Willie Drewrey; Tight ends (TE): 89 Jesse Anderson; 82 Ron Hall; 86 Ed Thomas	Offensive linemen (OL): 62 Ian Beckles G; 69 John Bruhin G; 76 Scott Dill G/T; 74 Paul Gruber T; 61 Tony Mayberry C; 73 Tom McHale G; 70 Charles McRae T; 64 Tim Ryan G; 72 Rob Taylor T; Defensive linemen (DL): 66 Rhett Hall DE/DT; 52 Keith McCants DE; 96 Tim Newton DT; 77 Gerald Nichols DT; 98 Ray Seals DE	Linebackers (LB): 57 Al Chamblee OLB; 99 Eugene Marve MLB; 59 Kevin Murphy OLB; 55 Jesse Solomon MLB; 51 Broderick Thomas OLB; 58 Calvin Tiggle MLB; Defensive backs (DB): 44 Carl Carter CB; 23 Marty Carter FS; 25 Tony Covington SS; 33 William Frizzell FS; 27 Darrell Fullington FS; 22 Alonzo Hampton CB; 24 Roger Jones CB; 29 Ricky Reynolds CB; Special teams (ST): 56 Sam Anno LS; 2 Steve Christie K; 3 Mark Royals P	Practice squad: 81 Linzy Collins WR; 50 Maurice Crum LB; 45 Darrell Malone CB; Reserve: 85 Terry Anthony WR (IR); -- Irvin Clark DT (IR); 79 Reuben Davis DT (IR); 60 Randy Grimes C (IR); 39 Harry Hamilton S (IR); 84 Bruce Hill WR (IR); 94 Robert Martz DE (IR); 30 Mark Robinson S (IR); Rookies in italics 45 active, 8 reserve, 3 practice squad

== Preseason ==
Week	Date	Opponent	Result	Record	Venue	Attendance
1	August 5	at Cleveland Browns	W 23–10	1–0	Cleveland Municipal Stadium	64,753
2	August 10	Miami Dolphins	L 13–29	1–1	Tampa Stadium	51,387
3	August 17	at Atlanta Falcons	W 12–7	2–1	Atlanta–Fulton County Stadium	41,983
4	August 23	Kansas City Chiefs	W 20–7	3–1	Tampa Stadium	33,996

== Regular season ==
=== Schedule ===
Week	Date	Opponent	Result	Record	Venue	Attendance
1	September 1	at New York Jets	**L** 13–16	0–1	Giants Stadium	61,204
2	September 8	**Chicago Bears**	**L** 20–21	0–2	Tampa Stadium	65,625
3	September 15	at **Green Bay Packers**	**L** 13–15	0–3	Lambeau Field	58,114
4	September 22	Buffalo Bills	**L** 10–17	0–4	Tampa Stadium	57,323
5	September 29	at **Detroit Lions**	**L** 3–31	0–5	Pontiac Silverdome	44,479
6	October 6	Philadelphia Eagles	**W** 14–13	1–5	Tampa Stadium	41,219
7	Bye					
8	October 20	at New Orleans Saints	**L** 7–23	1–6	Louisiana Superdome	68,591
9	October 27	**Green Bay Packers**	**L** 0–27	1–7	Tampa Stadium	40,275
10	November 3	at **Minnesota Vikings**	**L** 13–28	1–8	Hubert H. Humphrey Metrodome	35,737
11	November 10	**Detroit Lions**	**W** 30–21	2–8	Tampa Stadium	37,742
12	November 17	at Atlanta Falcons	**L** 7–43	2–9	Atlanta–Fulton County Stadium	41,274
13	November 24	New York Giants	**L** 14–21	2–10	Tampa Stadium	63,698
14	December 1	at Miami Dolphins	**L** 14–33	2–11	Joe Robbie Stadium	51,036
15	December 8	**Minnesota Vikings**	**L** 24–26	2–12	Tampa Stadium	41,091
16	December 14	at **Chicago Bears**	**L** 0–27	2–13	Soldier Field	54,719
17	December 22	Indianapolis Colts	**W** 17–3	3–13	Tampa Stadium	28,043
Note: Intra-division opponents are in **bold** text.

=== Season summary ===
==== Week 6 ====
Team	1	2	3	4	Total
Eagles	0	0	13	0	13
• Buccaneers	0	0	0	14	14

- Date: October 6
- Location: Tampa Stadium
- Game start: 1:00 p.m. EST
- Game weather: 77 °F (25 °C); wind 8 mph (13 km/h)
- Referee: Red Cashion
- Television network: CBS

Scoring summary
Q3	PHI	Ruzek 18-yard field goal	PHI 3–0
Q3	PHI	Ruzek 45-yard field goal	PHI 6–0
Q3	PHI	Joyner recovered fumble in end zone	PHI 13–0
Q4	TB	Wilson 8-yard pass from Chandler (Christie kick)	PHI 13–7
Q4	TB	Hill 5-yard pass from Chandler (Christie kick)	TB 14–13

=== Standings ===
NFC Central
	W	L	T	PCT	DIV	CONF	PF	PA	STK
^{(2)} Detroit Lions	12	4	0	.750	6–2	8–4	339	295	W6
^{(4)} Chicago Bears	11	5	0	.688	7–1	9–3	299	269	L1
Minnesota Vikings	8	8	0	.500	3–5	8–6	301	306	L1
Green Bay Packers	4	12	0	.250	3–5	3–9	273	313	W1
Tampa Bay Buccaneers	3	13	0	.188	1–7	2–10	199	365	W1
