= List of Tampa Bay Buccaneers head coaches =

Buccaneers

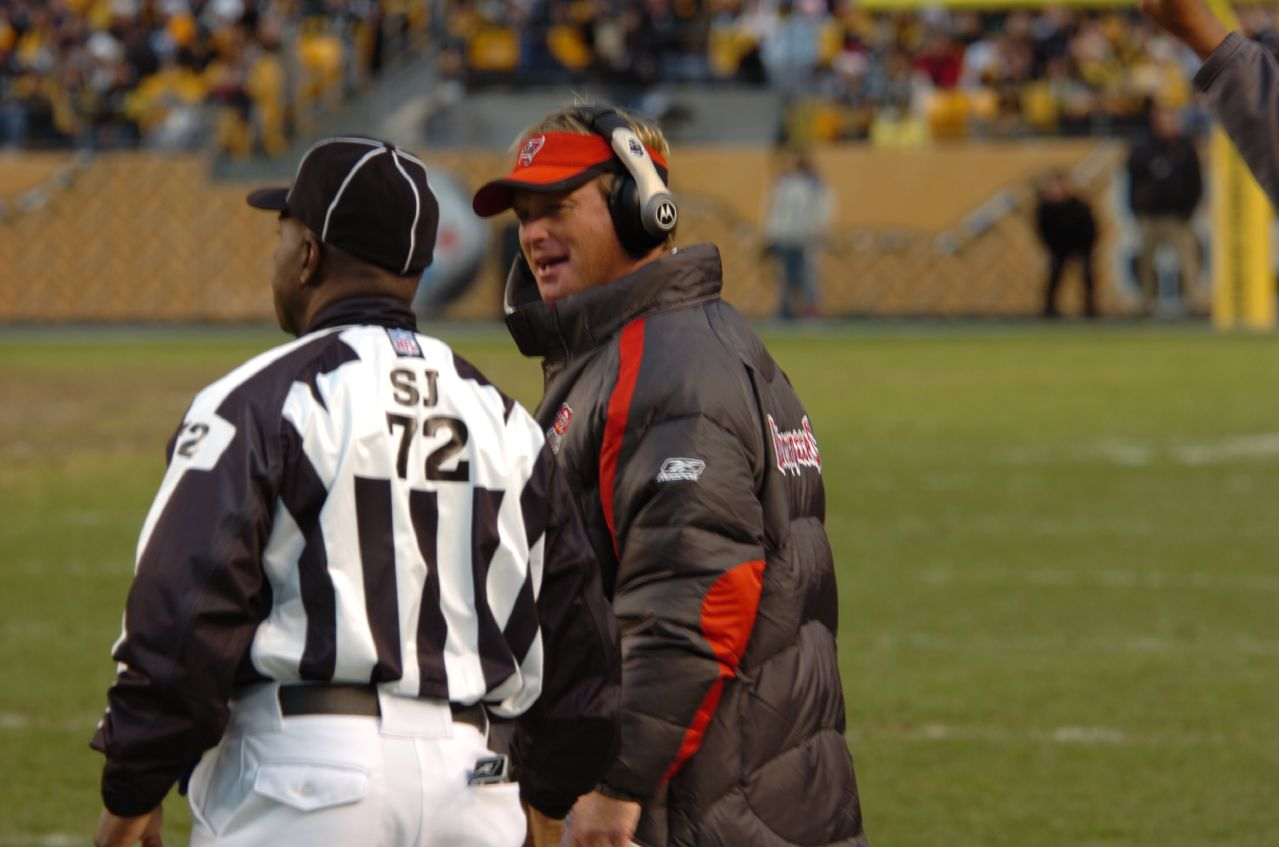
Jon Gruden was the Buccaneers' head coach between 2002 and 2008.

The Tampa Bay Buccaneers are a professional American football team based in Tampa, Florida. They are members of the Southern Division of the National Football Conference (NFC) in the National Football League (NFL). The franchise was founded as an NFL team in 1976 by Hugh Culverhouse. They lost their first 26 games and had one playoff win in its first 21 seasons before winning the Super Bowl in 2002.

There have been twelve head coaches for the Buccaneers franchise. The team has played 628 games in 50 seasons since joining the NFL. Five Buccaneers coaches, John McKay, Tony Dungy, Jon Gruden, Bruce Arians, and Todd Bowles have taken the Buccaneers to the playoffs, with Gruden and Arians being the only two coaches to win the Super Bowl with the team, at Super Bowl XXXVII and Super Bowl LV respectively. The team's all-time leader in games coached is McKay (133) and the leader in wins is Gruden (57); Arians leads all Buccaneers coaches in winning percentage (.633). Leeman Bennett has the lowest winning percentage (.125) of all Buccaneers coaches.

== Key ==
#	Number of coaches (Note: A running total of the number of coaches of the Buccaneers. Thus, any coach who has two or more terms as head coach is only counted once.)
Yrs	Years coached
First	First season coached
Last	Last season coached
GC	Games Coached
W	Wins
L	Loses
T	Ties
Win%	Win – Loss percentage
†	Elected into the Pro Football Hall of Fame as a coach
*	Spent entire NFL head coaching career with the Buccaneers

== Coaches ==
Note: Statistics are accurate through the end of the 2025 NFL season.

#	Image	Name	Term (Note: Each year is linked to an article about that particular NFL season.)			Regular season					Playoffs			Accomplishments	Ref.
#	Image	Name	Yrs	First	Last	GC	W	L	T	W%	GC	W	L	Accomplishments	Ref.
1		John McKay*	9	1976	1984	133	44	88	1	.335	4	1	3	2 NFC Central Championships (1979, 1981); 3 Playoff Berths	
2		Leeman Bennett	2	1985	1986	32	4	28	0	.125	—				
3		Ray Perkins	4	1987	1990 (Note: After 13 games of the 1990 season, with the Buccaneers at 5–8 (.385), Perkins was fired as head coach and replaced by offensive coordinator, Williamson, on an interim basis.)	60	19	41	0	.317	—				
4		Richard Williamson*	2	1990	1991	19	4	15	0	.211	—				
5		Sam Wyche	4	1992	1995	64	23	41	0	.359	—				
6		Tony Dungy ^{†}	6	1996	2001	96	54	42	0	.563	6	2	4	Inducted Pro Football Hall of Fame (2016); 1 NFC Central Championship (1999); 4 Playoff Berths; 1 Maxwell Football Club Coach of the Year (1997)	
7		Jon Gruden	7	2002	2008	112	57	55	0	.509	5	3	2	1 Super Bowl Championship (XXXVII); 1 NFC Championship (2002); 3 NFC South Championships (2002, 2005, 2007); 3 Playoff Berths	
8		Raheem Morris	3	2009	2011	48	17	31	0	.354	—				
9		Greg Schiano*	2	2012	2013	32	11	21	0	.344	—				
10		Lovie Smith	2	2014	2015	32	8	24	0	.250	—				
11		Dirk Koetter*	3	2016	2018	48	19	29	0	.396	—				
12		Bruce Arians	3	2019	2021	49	31	18	0	.633	6	5	1	1 Super Bowl Championship (LV); 1 NFC Championship (2020); 1 NFC South Championship (2021); 2 Playoff Berths	
13		Todd Bowles	4	2022 – present		68	35	35	0	.500	4	1	3	3 NFC South Championships (2022, 2023, 2024); 3 Playoff Berths	
