= Dan Stryzinski =

American football player (born 1965)

No. 4
- Position: Punter

Personal information
- Born: May 15, 1965 (age 61); Vincennes, Indiana, U.S.
- Listed height: 6 ft 0 in (1.83 m)
- Listed weight: 205 lb (93 kg)

Career information
- High school: Lincoln (Vincennes)
- College: Indiana
- NFL draft: 1988: undrafted

Career history
- Indianapolis Colts (1988)*; Cleveland Browns (1988)*; Cleveland Browns (1989)*; New Orleans Saints (1989)*; Pittsburgh Steelers (1990–1991); Tampa Bay Buccaneers (1992–1994); Atlanta Falcons (1995–2000); Kansas City Chiefs (2001–2002); New York Jets (2003)
- * Offseason or practice squad member only

Career NFL statistics
- Punts: 1,055
- Punt yards: 42,072
- Longest punt: 76
- Stats at Pro Football Reference

Daniel Thomas Stryzinski (born May 15, 1965) is an American former professional football player who was a punter for 14 seasons in the National Football League (NFL). He played college football for the Indiana Hoosiers. He played in Super Bowl XXXIII as a member of the Atlanta Falcons.

Originally from Vincennes, Indiana, Stryzinski has called Atlanta his home for the last 15 years. Stryzinski has a Finance and Management degree from Indiana University. After college, he pursued his dream of playing football in the NFL and after 14 years (6 with the Atlanta Falcons) he retired. With retirement came the time and ability to pursue another passion of his, cars, and he has been in the automotive business for years now. Stryzinski is married with two children and enjoys riding his motorcycle, golfing, tennis, and deer hunting.

== NFL career statistics ==
Legend
	Led the league
**Bold**	Career high

=== Regular season ===
Year	Team	Punting									
Year	Team	GP	Punts	Yds	Net Yds	Lng	Avg	Net Avg	Blk	Ins20	TB
1990	PIT	16	65	2,454	2,249	51	37.8	34.1	**1**	17	5
1991	PIT	16	74	2,996	2,726	63	40.5	36.3	**1**	10	3
1992	TAM	16	74	3,015	2,678	57	40.7	36.2	0	15	**11**
1993	TAM	16	**93**	**3,772**	**3,318**	57	40.6	35.3	**1**	24	3
1994	TAM	16	72	2,800	2,586	53	38.9	35.9	0	20	6
1995	ATL	16	67	2,759	2,423	64	41.2	36.2	0	21	5
1996	ATL	16	75	3,152	2,659	58	**42.0**	35.5	0	22	4
1997	ATL	16	89	3,498	3,263	57	39.3	36.7	0	20	9
1998	ATL	16	74	2,963	2,711	55	40.0	36.6	0	25	7
1999	ATL	16	80	3,163	2,964	55	39.5	37.1	0	**27**	4
2000	ATL	16	84	3,447	3,221	60	41.0	**37.9**	**1**	**27**	5
2001	KAN	16	73	2,976	2,599	**76**	40.8	35.6	0	**27**	5
2002	KAN	16	64	2,422	2,028	56	37.8	31.2	**1**	15	6
2003	NYJ	16	71	2,655	2,253	55	37.4	31.3	**1**	22	4
Career		224	1,055	42,072	37,678	76	39.9	35.5	6	292	77

=== Playoffs ===
Year	Team	Punting									
Year	Team	GP	Punts	Yds	Net Yds	Lng	Avg	Net Avg	Blk	Ins20	TB
1995	ATL	1	5	183	111	42	36.6	22.2	0	1	0
1998	ATL	**3**	**8**	**341**	**328**	**56**	**42.6**	**41.0**	0	**4**	**1**
Career		4	13	524	439	56	40.3	33.8	0	5	1

== See also ==
- List of most consecutive starts and games played by National Football League players
