= Hugh Culverhouse =

American businessman (1919–1994)

- Born: Hugh Franklin Culverhouse; February 20, 1919; Birmingham, Alabama, U.S.
- Died: August 25, 1994 (aged 75); New Orleans, Louisiana, U.S.
- Occupations: Businessman; Entrepreneur; Sports team owner/executive
- Years active: 1947–1994, his death

Hugh Franklin Culverhouse Sr. (February 20, 1919 – August 25, 1994) was an American businessman, attorney, and sports franchise owner. Culverhouse is best known for having been the longtime owner of the Tampa Bay Buccaneers of the National Football League (NFL). He was a successful tax lawyer, and his real estate investments made him wealthy. His work brought him into contact with National Football League team owners, and his failed purchase of the Los Angeles Rams placed him in line to become the owner of the fledgling Buccaneer franchise. He owned the team from its inception until his death.

Culverhouse became one of the most influential team owners in the NFL. Although his teams were rarely competitive on the field, he was credited with modernizing the league. He oversaw the league's course of direction through two player strikes, and the modern league's financial stability is in great part due to his leadership. He held influence for over a decade, before stepping back due to criticism of what other owners saw as his overly-secretive ways.

Culverhouse was initially lauded for bringing professional football to the Tampa Bay area, but eventually came to be blamed for the team's struggles. His refusal to pay Doug Williams at a salary level comparable to that of the league's top quarterbacks stirred resentment among fans, and marked the beginning of the team's decline during the 1980s. It further led to the belief that Culverhouse was more concerned with fielding a profitable team than a winning one. The Buccaneers' NFL-record streak of 14 consecutive losing seasons contributed to this perception, although Culverhouse did make several notable attempts to improve the team.

Culverhouse was diagnosed with lung cancer in 1992, and died in 1994. His apparent attempt to exclude his wife from his inheritance led to posthumous revelations of extramarital affairs. Ensuing lawsuits caused an ownership crisis that almost required the team to relocate to another city, before the Glazer family stepped forward with a purchase offer.

== Early life ==
A native of Birmingham, Alabama, Culverhouse attended the University of Alabama, where he was a member of Delta Kappa Epsilon fraternity (Psi chapter). On the University of Alabama boxing team, he competed together with future governor George Wallace, an experience to which he attributed his confidence in later life. He graduated in 1941. After serving in the Army Air Corps in World War II, he earned a law degree from his alma mater in 1947. He immediately took a job as an assistant state attorney general, serving there for two years. After serving in the Korean War, he became legal counsel for the Internal Revenue Service, where he prosecuted many of the cases resulting from the organized crime investigations of Senator Estes Kefauver. He resigned from the IRS in 1962 after a decade of service, and moved to Jacksonville, Florida, where he entered private practice, specializing in tax law. Although he was considered to be one of the nation's top tax lawyers, one whose cases were sometimes cited by the Supreme Court of the United States, his fortune was built on real estate investments. Listed by Forbes magazine as one of the 250 wealthiest people in the United States, he eventually had investments in 37 companies and was worth over $380 million at his death. He served as a personal representative of President Gerald Ford, bearing the title of U.S. Ambassador, at the 1976 Winter Olympics in Innsbruck, Austria. The University of Alabama's Culverhouse College of Commerce and Business Administration is named for him.

Culverhouse's investments included several banks, Provincetown-Boston Airlines, the Palmer Ranch real estate development near Sarasota, Florida, and movie productions including A Chorus Line and The Emerald Forest. He was criticized over a planned extension of Interstate 75 into South Florida, as its route went directly past land owned by numerous powerful investors, including Culverhouse, Governor Bob Graham, State Attorney General Jim Smith, and the Arvida Corporation.

== Ownership of the Tampa Bay Buccaneers ==
In 1972, Culverhouse had a handshake deal to buy the Los Angeles Rams from owner Dan Reeves for $17 million ($127 million in 2024), only to learn that Reeves later sold the team to Robert Irsay for $19 million ($142 million in 2024). When Irsay then traded teams with Baltimore Colts owner Carroll Rosenbloom, Culverhouse sued, claiming that the others had conspired to prevent his purchase of the team. An out-of-court settlement guaranteed Rosenbloom's aid in getting an expansion franchise for Culverhouse. The opportunity came two years later, when the league expanded to Seattle and Tampa. Culverhouse was offered the Seattle expansion franchise, but declined it due to his residence in Jacksonville. Philadelphia construction company owner Thomas McCloskey was originally awarded the Tampa franchise, but soon found the business arrangement to be different than what he had expected, and backed out of the deal. Culverhouse was then awarded the franchise by the Art Rooney-chaired NFL Expansion Committee, ahead of Fort Lauderdale furniture chain (and future Boston Celtics) owner Harry T. Mangurian, Jr. The name "Tampa Bay Buccaneers" was chosen as a nod to the team representing not only the city of Tampa, but the entire Florida Suncoast area; and to the pirates who once inhabited the area.

Culverhouse quickly became one of the most influential NFL owners; he served as a member of the Player Club Relations Committee that handled player grievances, and of the NFL Congressional Committee. He was a member of the executive committee that handled negotiations during the 1982 NFL strike, an experience that earned him great praise from NFL negotiator Jack Donlan. Donlan praised Culverhouse's logic, analytical, and problem-solving skills, and his effectiveness "at getting his way". Culverhouse was credited with having a big hand in the owners' course of direction during the strike, and was responsible for recruiting Donlan as negotiator. He repeated the role during the 1987 players' strike, after which NFLPA President Gene Upshaw described him as "formidable", and said that "at times, the whole league seemed to flow from this one guy". He was chairman of the NFL Finance Committee and the Management Council Executive Committee. His efforts were instrumental in bringing Super Bowl XVIII to Tampa, despite a lack of adequate hotel space in the city. Culverhouse was also a pioneer in using computers to handle team finances and scouting reports. He was a member of the four-man committee that stripped ownership of the New England Patriots from the Sullivan family when their debt became too great. Patriots founder Billy Sullivan later accused Culverhouse of blocking his effort to propose a stock sale that would have eased the debt. Culverhouse distanced himself from the NFL power core in later years, stung by other owners' criticisms of the Management Council. NFL Commissioner Paul Tagliabue credited Culverhouse for building much of the strength and unity of the modern NFL.

=== General criticism ===
Culverhouse was criticized by other team owners as the team prepared for its debut season, who said that his involvement in day-to-day team operations was reminiscent of the owners of the expansion Falcons and Saints, teams which had yet to qualify for the playoffs after a decade of play. Buccaneers employees were described as living in an "atmosphere of fear", especially after the firings during the 1977 offseason of executives who had been involved with unpopular decisions that Culverhouse had supported at the time. In one case, marketing director Bill Marcum was fired due to public backlash over the team's $12 ticket prices (about $62 in 2024) for an exhibition in Jacksonville, even though Culverhouse had set the ticket prices, and Marcum had opposed them.

=== Conflict of interest accusations ===
Culverhouse was named one of the executors of Los Angeles Rams owner Carroll Rosenbloom's estate, and after Rosenbloom's death, Culverhouse continued a business relationship with his widow, Georgia. Georgia's marriage to composer Dominic Frontiere took place at Culverhouse's home, with Culverhouse himself, a notary public, performing the ceremony. The relationship, in which Culverhouse served as an advisor to the Rams while maintaining ownership of the Buccaneers, was criticized as a conflict of interest. The Los Angeles Coliseum Council accused the Rams of seeking Culverhouse's counsel when several players held out during the 1980 preseason; the Buccaneers won a 10–9 victory over that same unprepared Rams team early that season. Culverhouse also oversaw a reorganization of the Rams' front office; the relationship earned him the nickname of "Godfather" of the Rams. Culverhouse and Frontiere were two of the owners named in a lawsuit brought by Al Davis, who alleged that their campaign contributions to Senator Robert Byrd of West Virginia were an attempt to buy his support in helping to prevent Davis' planned move of the Oakland Raiders to Los Angeles.

Culverhouse's relationships with other NFL owners were occasionally, as in his relationship with the Rams, alleged to constitute conflicts of interest. His $3 million loan to help Philadelphia Eagles owner Leonard Tose with his gambling debts was one example, as it violated the NFL constitution and bylaws. On other occasions, he was criticized for his overly-secretive ways as NFL Finance Committee Chairman, as other league owners found it difficult to obtain information on how league finances were being spent. In particular, owners were upset about not being informed about money given to NFL Commissioner Pete Rozelle in a 5-year extension of his contract. The extension was awarded to him by the Finance Committee as a reward for negotiation of the league television contract in 1982, even though Rozelle had five years remaining on his current contract.

=== Loss of popular support ===
Culverhouse was described as late as 1982 as a rare owner who was popular with players, coaches, and fans. He was commended for allowing his staff to handle football operations without interference, and for having the patience to allow John McKay to follow through with his building plan despite the franchise's 0–26 start. This changed after events surrounding the 1982 players' strike. A report issued by the National Football League Players Association prior to the start of negotiations revealed that the Buccaneers had the fifth-highest gross income of all NFL teams, while their average salary was only the 21st-highest. This directly contradicted statements made by Culverhouse in 1980, in which he told players that they were on one of the three highest-paid teams. The NFLPA figures showed that the Buccaneers were actually the third lowest-paying team, based on total salaries as a percentage of gross income. Culverhouse was then accused of trying to divide the players during the strike, when some of the team's assistant coaches contacted players to ask whether they would be willing to return to the team.

Culverhouse was considered to have drawn a closer friendship than an owner should to his coach, having guaranteed John McKay employment for life. When the team began to lose, area fans blamed McKay, and felt that there was no hope for any change. He was, however, credited with recognizing the need for a change in leadership, as he went outside of the organization in seeking a replacement when McKay retired. He then upset fans by broadcasting advertisements thanking fans for their support, while simultaneously raising ticket prices.

However, while Culverhouse's relationship with Tampa had been problematic for years, the Bo Jackson 1986 draft debacle permanently ruined the owner's reputation in his home city. Jackson, the Heisman Trophy-winning running back from Auburn, was the consensus #1 player headed into the draft. Jackson had never forgiven Culverhouse or the Buccaneers when they flew him to Tampa for a physical and a visit at the team's expense during his senior year, leading him to believe that the NCAA and Southeastern Conference had approved the trip. In truth, they had not done so. Since the Buccaneers paid for the trip, it violated an SEC rule that barred athletes from being professional in one sport and amateur in another. As a result, the trip cost Jackson his eligibility during his senior baseball season. Jackson believed the Buccaneers had deliberately tried to sabotage his baseball career, and told Culverhouse that "you're going to be wasting a draft pick" if they selected him. Regardless of Jackson's warning, the Buccaneers would take him with the 1st overall pick in the 1986 NFL draft. Jackson announced he would play major league baseball instead, signing a contract with the Kansas City Royals and leaving the Buccaneers as the NFL's laughingstock.

=== Doug Williams ===
Even before the Jackson incident, Culverhouse's reputation in Tampa had taken a hit due to his treatment of quarterback Doug Williams. Williams led the Buccaneers to the playoffs in three of his five years with the team, and was considered to be their single most important player. However, he was only paid $120,000 a year, which ranked 42nd among NFL quarterbacks, was less than what some teams' third-string quarterbacks made, and was lower than the salary of Terdell Middleton, a running back who had two total carries in his two years in Tampa Bay. After the 1982 season, Williams asked for a $600,000 contract that would pay him among the league's top quarterbacks. Culverhouse refused to budge from his initial offer of $400,000, which he said would make Williams one of the five highest-paid quarterbacks in the league. Williams' agent disputed this, saying that Culverhouse's offer was substantially less than what several other quarterbacks made. With negotiations at a standstill, the Buccaneers traded the following season's first-round draft pick to the Cincinnati Bengals in exchange for Jack Thompson, a backup quarterback who had been unable to unseat Ken Anderson, as an insurance policy should Williams prove impossible to sign, or have trouble recovering from offseason knee surgery. Williams interpreted this as a sign that the team did not want him, and sat out the 1983 season before signing a contract with the Oklahoma Outlaws of the springtime United States Football League. Adding injury to that insult, Williams later made an NFL comeback and signed with the Washington Redskins in 1986, and led the Redskins to a Super Bowl win in 1987, winning Super Bowl XXII and winning the Super Bowl MVP award.

Culverhouse's hard line with Williams created the perception that he was more concerned with profits than with putting a winning team on the field. It aroused suspicions that Culverhouse's main concern was the Buccaneers' salary structure, and that this was related to the frequency with which the team traded away its first-round draft choices. Williams' comments that he would have been treated differently had he been white resonated with the Bay Area African American community, who saw the Buccaneers' ensuing on-field woes as retribution, boycotted Buccaneer games by the thousands, and commented that Culverhouse threw parties that cost more than what Williams was asking for. The Buccaneers missed Williams' confidence and ability to make big plays at key times, and lost their first nine games in 1983, when they had been expected to contend for the playoffs. They finished 2–14, the first of what would be 14 consecutive losing seasons—the longest since the merger between the NFL and the All-America Football Conference in 1950—and would not have another winning season in Culverhouse's lifetime. They would lose 10 or more games in 13 of those years, including 12 in a row from 1983 to 1994—an NFL record. The timing of the situation coincided with the ascendance of the Tampa Bay Bandits, who led the USFL in attendance with a wide-open, crowd-pleasing offense led by local hero Steve Spurrier, while the Buccaneers were losing games with a conservative offense that fans found boring. Attendance having dropped sharply, Culverhouse then further alienated fans by berating them, accusing them of apathy.

=== Attendance and television availability ===
The long losing streak further penalized fans, as the NFL blackout policy usually prevented poorly attended Buccaneer home games from being shown on local television. No Buccaneers home games were televised on local stations for several years following November 29, 1982 (a Monday Night Football game vs. the Dolphins), including a game on January 2, 1983, that sold out, but not in time to lift the blackout. In total, the Buccaneers had a streak of 32 consecutive blackouts before a November 9, 1986 game against the then-reigning Super Bowl champion Chicago Bears sold out in time to allow for local television. At one point, the CBS television network, which had the rights to NFC television broadcasts at the time, correctly anticipated poor seasons from all of the Southern (Buccaneers, Falcons, and Saints) teams, and reorganized their viewing markets in such a way that Buccaneers games were not broadcast anywhere in the state of Florida. Culverhouse went so far as to dictate that Miami Dolphins games also be blacked out, sometimes even when Buccaneer games were sellouts. He further inflamed fans in 1989 by proposing to move some of the team's games to Orlando, due to poor attendance. Several local radio stations responded with billboards saying "Hugh gotta go!", and with a picture of a screw next to Culverhouse's name. The Tampa Chamber of Commerce countered with a billboard thanking Culverhouse for bringing Super Bowl XXV to Tampa.

=== Profitability ===
Although enjoyment factored into Culverhouse's purchase of the Buccaneers, it was first and foremost a business decision which he expected to be profitable. He admitted to being known for his frugality, due to moves such as wearing outdated clothing, and having the One Buc Place walls painted white to avoid having to spend money on projection screens. This was not initially a problem for the franchise, even though the budget airplane that Culverhouse chartered for the team almost crashed after their very first game; original coach John McKay reported in 1978 that Culverhouse had never blocked any deals, even those involving a great amount of money. Later, however, the team let go or traded away many of its players who were highly paid and/or demanded more money, including Dave Pear, Doug Williams, Ricky Reynolds, Reggie Cobb, Mark Carrier, and Jeris White. First-round draft choices were frequently traded for players who were not considered to be of equal value, as when the team traded for often-injured defensive end Wally Chambers without requiring that he first pass a physical examination. Frustration over being beaten by players he had pleaded with Culverhouse to sign contributed to the resignation of McKay. He also fired well-regarded personnel director Ken Herock, when Herock demanded to be paid in line with his value around the league.

Despite the losing and the poor attendance, the Buccaneers were one of the NFL's most profitable teams for most of Culverhouse's ownership. In 1989, only the Chicago Bears had higher profits than the 5–11 Buccaneers, who profited $6.3 million with the league's second-lowest payroll, while the Super Bowl champion San Francisco 49ers lost $16.2 million. The team attributed their low salaries to the players' youth, stating that it was the coaches who had made the decision to use younger players, who drew lower salaries than veterans. This contributed to the perception that Culverhouse was not committed to fielding a quality team, although the rookie contracts he gave to Vinny Testaverde and Paul Gruber were so high as to upset other team owners, while he made Ray Perkins one of the five highest-paid NFL head coaches. He also offered Bill Parcells $6.5 million to coach the team, offered draft pick Bo Jackson a five-year, $7 million contract that was at the time the highest in NFL history for a rookie, paid Keith McCants an NFL-record $2.5 million signing bonus, and paid Steve Young $6 million in salary, plus another $1 million for the buyout of his USFL contract.

== Death and aftermath ==
Culverhouse was diagnosed with lung cancer in 1992. After a successful operation to remove a tumor and part of his lung, he began chemotherapy a few months later, when a routine exam revealed a recurrence of the cancer. Despite his health problems, he even went hunting in Tanzania only four days after having part of his lung removed. An experimental procedure failed to stop the cancer, and he died on August 25, 1994, at the Medical Center of Louisiana at New Orleans. He was survived by wife Joy, daughter Gay, and son Hugh, Jr.

=== Sale of the Buccaneers ===
Several investors stepped forward with offers to buy the Buccaneers after Culverhouse's death, including Baltimore Orioles owner Peter Angelos, New York Yankees owner (and Tampa resident) George Steinbrenner, and Massachusetts developer Socrates Babacas. In response to the ensuing publicity, the trust administering Culverhouse's estate then issued a statement that the team was not for sale. They reversed their position two months later, as a poor early-season record led to declining fan support and revenues. The decision to sell the franchise came on the same day that Joy filed a $25 million claim against Hugh's estate. Hugh had paid $16 million for the franchise, which was now valued at $142 million. With Barnett Bank filing claims for $20.8 million against the Culverhouse estate, the trustees came very close to accepting Angelos' $200 million offer, which would have involved relocating the team to Baltimore, Maryland. Fearful of losing the team, civic leaders presented a proposal guaranteeing ticket sales of at least 55,000 for all home games for the next two years. The team was eventually sold to Palm Beach, Florida businessman Malcolm Glazer for $192 million, at that moment the largest price ever paid for a professional sports franchise.

=== Lawsuits over the Culverhouse estate ===
Before Culverhouse's death, his wife, Joy, had signed a post-nuptial agreement to surrender her half of the estate. This was done on the advice of lawyer Fred F. Cone, Jr., who would later become one of the three trustees handling the Culverhouse estate. Joy charged that the trustees were mishandling the estate, and not paying her share. She filed a malpractice suit against Cone for advising her to give up her marital rights, and a second suit asking for accounting of the estate and removal of the trustees. She said that Hugh and Cone advised her to sign the agreement for tax reasons, and falsely claimed that Culverhouse was on the brink of bankruptcy. She charged that the three trustees, Cone, Jack Donlan, and Stephen F. Story, paid themselves $4.35 million in bonuses for arranging the Buccaneers' sale, sums far in excess of what Culverhouse himself had specified, and that they paid Story a sum that was comparable to the salary of a Fortune 500 executive for managing the estate and included a 10-year golden parachute clause. She also alleged that the value of Culverhouse's estate had been misrepresented to her at the time that she signed the agreement. The lawsuits made the details of the Culverhouse estate public. When it was discovered that the trust had paid hush money to a mistress of Hugh's, Joy's lawyer alleged that Hugh had planned to divorce Joy, and that the trust was created to deprive her of her rightful assets. Court depositions revealed three extramarital affairs, including Susan Brinkley, wife of broadcaster David Brinkley. The suits were eventually settled, with each of the three trustees being paid $3 million to remove themselves from the handling of his estate, and Joy being allowed to appoint her own trustees. Joy then said of Hugh, "I'd like to pull him out of the grave and shoot him with every bullet I could get".

== Philanthropy ==
In contrast with his frugal ways in business, Culverhouse frequently contributed to the community. Some of his notable donations include:

- A $4.6 million gift to the University of South Florida, which established the Culverhouse Chair in Education at the University of South Florida Sarasota-Manatee and was the largest donation in school history;
- $600,000 to the University of Florida, for the establishment of the Hugh F. Culverhouse Eminent Scholars Chair in Federal Taxation;
- $500,000 to the Stetson University College of Law, for a visiting-professor chair;
- $10 million to the University of Alabama, the 3rd largest gift in school history;
- 3 acres (12,000 m^{2}) of vacant Tarpon Springs, Florida land to Habitat for Humanity; and
- The first $1 million pledged for the construction of the Straz Center for the Performing Arts.

Culverhouse was also a member of the board of trustees who administered the annual Florida Prize award for outstanding work in the visual or performing arts.

== Awards ==
- 1975 Golden Plate Award of the American Academy of Achievement
- 1993 Florida Sports Hall of Fame

== Family ==
Culverhouse had at least one son, who maintains his tradition of philanthropy and is a former assistant U.S. attorney for the U.S. Department of Justice. The name of Hugh Jr's wife is Eliza. Together they support the University of Alabama, the University of Miami, the Episcopalian Church of the Redeemer in Sarasota, Florida.
