= Mark Duckens =

American football player (born 1965)

No. 75, 91, 95
- Position: Defensive end / Defensive tackle

Personal information
- Born: March 4, 1965 (age 61); Wichita, Kansas, U.S.
- Listed height: 6 ft 4 in (1.93 m)
- Listed weight: 270 lb (122 kg)

Career information
- High school: Wichita North
- College: Arizona State
- NFL draft: 1988: undrafted

Career history
- Washington Redskins (1988); New York Giants (1989); Detroit Lions (1990); Tampa Bay Buccaneers (1992); Indianapolis Colts (1995)

Career NFL statistics
- Games played: 35
- Games started: 3
- Fumble recoveries: 2
- Sacks: 3
- Stats at Pro Football Reference

Mark Anthony Duckens (born March 4, 1965) is an American former professional football player who was a defensive lineman in the National Football League (NFL). He played college football for the Wichita State Shockers and Arizona State Sun Devils. He was a defensive tackle and a defensive end. Duckens played in the NFL for the New York Giants (1989), Detroit Lions (1990), and Tampa Bay Buccaneers (1992). He also briefly played for the Indianapolis Colts as well.

In 1993, Duckens was sentenced to a six-month pretrial diversion program for steroid possession along with former New York Giants teammate Eric Moore. They were described by federal agents as “pawns in international steroid ring.”|
