= Marty Carter =

American football player (born 1969)

No. 23, 25, 38
- Position: Safety

Personal information
- Born: December 17, 1969 (age 56); LaGrange, Georgia, U.S.
- Listed height: 6 ft 1 in (1.85 m)
- Listed weight: 209 lb (95 kg)

Career information
- High school: LaGrange
- College: Middle Tennessee State
- NFL draft: 1991: 8th round, 207th overall pick

Career history
- Tampa Bay Buccaneers (1991–1994); Chicago Bears (1995–1998); Atlanta Falcons (1999–2001); Detroit Lions (2001)

Career NFL statistics
- Tackles: 1,003
- Interceptions: 13
- Sacks: 6
- Stats at Pro Football Reference

Marty LaVincent Carter (born December 17, 1969) is an American former professional football player who was a safety in the National Football League (NFL). He played for the Tampa Bay Buccaneers, Chicago Bears, Atlanta Falcons, and Detroit Lions. He played college football for the Middle Tennessee Blue Raiders and was selected by the Buccaneers in the eighth round of the 1991 NFL draft.

== NFL career statistics ==
Legend
**Bold**	Career high

Year	Team	Games		Tackles				Interceptions				Fumbles			
Year	Team	GP	GS	Comb	Solo	Ast	Sck	Int	Yds	TD	Lng	FF	FR	Yds	TD
1991	TAM	14	11	62	62	0	0.0	1	5	0	5	0	0	0	0
1992	TAM	16	16	118	118	0	**2.0**	**3**	1	0	1	0	0	0	0
1993	TAM	16	14	**130**	**130**	0	0.0	1	0	0	0	1	**2**	0	0
1994	TAM	16	14	93	74	19	1.0	0	0	0	0	1	0	0	0
1995	CHI	16	16	95	80	15	0.0	2	20	0	15	**2**	1	0	0
1996	CHI	16	16	101	88	13	0.0	**3**	**34**	0	**29**	1	0	0	0
1997	CHI	15	15	96	70	**26**	1.0	1	14	0	14	0	0	0	0
1998	CHI	16	16	111	88	23	0.0	0	0	0	0	0	**2**	0	0
1999	ATL	11	11	74	59	15	0.0	1	4	0	4	0	1	0	0
2000	ATL	16	16	95	75	20	**2.0**	0	0	0	0	**2**	**2**	0	0
2001	ATL	5	5	20	18	2	0.0	0	0	0	0	1	0	0	0
2001	DET	4	1	8	6	2	0.0	1	0	0	0	0	0	0	0
Career		161	151	1,003	868	135	6.0	13	78	0	29	8	8	0	0
