= Richard Williamson (American football) =

American football player and coach (1941–2015)

Biographical details
- Born: April 13, 1941; Fort Deposit, Alabama, U.S.
- Died: September 21, 2015 (aged 74); Charlotte, North Carolina, U.S.

Playing career
- 1959–1962: Alabama
- Position: End

Coaching career (HC unless noted)
- 1963–1967: Alabama (WR)
- 1968–1969: Arkansas (assistant)
- 1970–1971: Alabama (DL)
- 1972–1974: Arkansas (OC)
- 1975–1980: Memphis State
- 1983–1986: Kansas City Chiefs (WR)
- 1987–1990: Tampa Bay Buccaneers (AHC/WR)
- 1990–1991: Tampa Bay Buccaneers
- 1992–1994: Cincinnati Bengals (WR)
- 1995–2000: Carolina Panthers (WR)
- 2000–2001: Carolina Panthers (AHC/OC/WR)
- 2002–2009: Carolina Panthers (WR)

Head coaching record
- Overall: 32–34 (college); 4–15 (NFL)

Accomplishments and honors

Awards
- All-SEC (1962)

Richard Williamson (April 13, 1941 – September 21, 2015) was an American football player and coach. He was the head football coach at Memphis State University—now known as the University of Memphis—from 1975 to 1980. Williamson served as the head coach for the Tampa Bay Buccaneers of the National Football League (NFL) from 1990 to 1991.

== College career ==
Williamson was an end under legendary Alabama coach Bear Bryant for the 1961 and 1962 seasons. He caught Joe Namath's first touchdown pass at Alabama. He was one of five players who testified to an Alabama Legislative Committee after The Saturday Evening Post ran an article claiming that Georgia head coach Wally Butts had conspired with Bryant to throw a football game. Both Bryant and Butts later were awarded money in libel suits against the paper. Williamson was the 55th pick in the 1963 American Football League draft, drafted by the Boston Patriots, but he chose to stay at Alabama as a coach, helping the Tide win National Championships for the 1964 and 1965 seasons.

After a two-year coaching stay at the University of Arkansas, Williamson returned to Alabama for 1970 to 1971 before leaving for Arkansas again (from 1972 to 1974). Williamson then left for Memphis State University, becoming head coach (1975–1980). Williamson's teams finished 7–4 (1975, 1976), 6–5 (1977), 4–7 (1978), 5–6 (1979), and 2–9 (1980). Williamson was honored with the Southern Independent Conference Coach of the Year award twice. After being fired from Memphis, Williamson spent several years as the executive director of the Bluebonnet Bowl.

== Professional career ==
Williamson returned to coaching in 1983, when he was hired as an assistant for the Kansas City Chiefs under new coach John Mackovic. Mackovic was fired following the 1986 season and replaced by special teams coach Frank Gansz, who opted not to retain Williamson. He moved to the Tampa Bay Buccaneers, working under fellow former Alabama player Ray Perkins as offensive coordinator. When Perkins was fired late in the 1990 season, Williamson was named interim head coach. He led the team to a 1–2 record to close the season, but the Bucs showed enough promise under his watch that the "interim" tag was removed ahead of the 1991 season. The momentum did not last, however. The Bucs never recovered from a 1–8 start and ultimately finished 3–13, the team's ninth-consecutive 10-loss season and their worst record since 1986. Williamson was fired at the end of the season.

Williamson was the receivers coach for the Cincinnati Bengals from 1992 to 1994 under David Shula. Williamson left in 1995 to join the newly formed Carolina Panthers as receivers coach.

In 2000, Williamson was named assistant head coach under George Seifert; he was later named offensive coordinator as well, after Bill Musgrave resigned four games into the season. After the 2001 season, Williamson returned to coaching the receivers under new head coach, John Fox. During his tenure with the Panthers, Williamson became known as one of the top receiver coaches in the NFL. He developed Muhsin Muhammad and Steve Smith into Pro Bowl mainstays.

Williamson announced his retirement on January 18, 2010, after 15 seasons with the Panthers. He was the last member of the original 1995 staff still with the team.

== Personal life ==
Williamson and his wife, Norma, had two grown children, Rich and Caroline. Williamson was living in Charlotte, North Carolina at the time of his death. He died on September 21, 2015.

== Head coaching record ==
=== College ===
Year	Team	Overall	Conference	Standing	Bowl/playoffs
Memphis State Tigers (NCAA Division I/I-A independent) (1975–1980)
1975	Memphis State	7–4			
1976	Memphis State	8–3			
1977	Memphis State	6–5			
1978	Memphis State	4–7			
1979	Memphis State	5–6			
1980	Memphis State	2–9			
Memphis State:		32–34			
Total:		32–34			

=== NFL ===
Team	Year	Regular Season					Postseason			
Team	Year	Won	Lost	Ties	Win %	Finish	Won	Lost	Win %	Result
TB	1990	1	2	0	.333	2nd in NFC Central	–	–	–	–
TB	1991	3	13	0	.188	5th in NFC Central	–	–	–	–
TB Total		4	15	0	.211		–	–	–	
Total		4	15	0	.211					
