= Reggie Cobb =

American football player and scout (1968–2019)

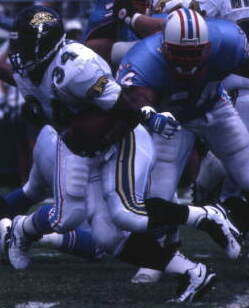
- Cobb with the Jacksonville Jaguars in 1995

No. 33, 34, 32, 28
- Position: Running back

Personal information
- Born: July 7, 1968; Knoxville, Tennessee, U.S.
- Died: April 20, 2019 (aged 50); Santa Clara, California, U.S.
- Listed height: 6 ft 1 in (1.85 m)
- Listed weight: 212 lb (96 kg)

Career information
- High school: Central (Knoxville)
- College: Tennessee
- NFL draft: 1990: 2nd round, 30th overall pick
- Expansion draft: 1995: 27th round, 53rd overall pick

Career history
- Tampa Bay Buccaneers (1990–1993); Green Bay Packers (1994); Jacksonville Jaguars (1995); New York Jets (1996)

Awards and highlights
- Second-team All-SEC (1987)

Career NFL statistics
- Rushing yards: 3,743
- Rushing average: 3.5
- Rushing touchdowns: 25
- Receptions: 123
- Receiving yards: 949
- Receiving touchdowns: 2
- Stats at Pro Football Reference

Reginald John Cobb (July 7, 1968 – April 20, 2019) was an American professional football player who was a running back for seven seasons in the National Football League (NFL). He played college football for the Tennessee Volunteers, leading the Southeastern Conference (SEC) in touchdowns his freshman year. A second-round selection in the 1990 NFL draft, he initially played for the Tampa Bay Buccaneers, registering his best season in 1992 when he rushed for over a thousand yards and scored nine touchdowns. He was later a member of the inaugural roster of the Jacksonville Jaguars.

== High school ==
Cobb was born in Knoxville, Tennessee, where he was a four-year starter at Central High School. During his senior year, he rushed for 1,141 yards and 13 touchdowns, averaging 6.7 yards per carry, and returned 13 kickoffs for 305 yards and a touchdown. He was named to the Nashville Banner Elite 11, and was ranked the number three recruit in the state by the Knoxville News Sentinel.

As a member of Central's track team, Cobb won the state long jump title, and placed fifth in the 100-meter dash.

== College ==
Cobb signed with the Tennessee Volunteers in 1986, part of a stellar recruiting class that included future NFL players Alvin Harper, Anthony Miller, Antone Davis, Charles McRae, and Tracy Hayworth. He redshirted his first year as veterans William Howard, Keith Davis and Charles Wilson handled the bulk of the team's rushing duties. Cobb rushed for 90 yards on 15 carries, including a 54-yard touchdown, in the 1987 Orange-and-White Game, and emerged from spring practice third in the running back rotation behind Keith Davis and Vando Davis.

Cobb received considerable playing time in his first game of the 1987 season and made the most of the opportunity, erupting for 138 yards on 25 carries in the Vols' 23–22 win over Iowa. In Tennessee's 38–10 win over Mississippi State, Cobb scored three touchdowns, including a 39-yard touchdown reception in the first quarter. Two weeks later, he rushed for 66 yards and scored two touchdowns, including the game-tying touchdown late in the fourth quarter, in Tennessee's 20–20 tie against Auburn. In Tennessee's 38–12 win over California, Cobb rushed for 94 yards and two touchdowns, and caught a 25-yard touchdown pass. He rushed for 140 yards and two touchdowns in Tennessee's win over Georgia Tech, picked up 127 yards and two touchdowns against Louisville, scored three touchdowns against Ole Miss, and finished the season with 144 and 140 rushing yards, respectively, in close wins against Kentucky and Vanderbilt. In Tennessee's 27–22 win over Indiana in the 1988 Peach Bowl, Cobb rushed for 146 yards and two touchdowns, including the go-ahead touchdown late in the fourth quarter, to win game MVP honors. For the season, he had a school-record 1,721 all-purpose yards, including a team-leading 1,197 rushing yards. His 20 touchdowns (17 rushing and three receiving) was second in the nation behind Paul Hewitt's 24, and tied an SEC record.

During the 1988 season, Cobb missed three full games and part of two games with an ankle injury, and his production dropped to 547 yards rushing and three touchdowns on 118 carries, and 126 yards and three touchdowns on 17 catches. He rushed for a career-high 182 yards against Duke, and picked up 111 yards rushing against Ole Miss before leaving the game with an injury.

Prior to spring practice in 1989, Cobb was placed on indefinite suspension for failing a third drug test. After completing a drug rehabilitation program, he was reinstated just before the start of the season. He rushed for 98 yards and a touchdown in Tennessee's 17–14 opening win over Colorado State, and added 78 yards against UCLA the following week, sharing time with rising star Chuck Webb to form a running back tandem that became known as "Cobb-Webb." In Tennessee's 28–6 win over Duke, Cobb rushed for 109 yards and three touchdowns, much of his total coming on a 61-yard fourth-quarter touchdown run. The biggest game of Cobb's college career came in Tennessee's 21–14 win over Auburn, when he exploded for 225 yards on 22 carries, including a 79-yard touchdown run in the second quarter. In Tennessee's 17–14 win over Georgia, Cobb rushed for 106 yards on 20 carries, and scored a key touchdown in the fourth quarter.

Cobb was dismissed from the team prior to Tennessee's game against Alabama in October 1989 after he once again failed a drug test. For his abbreviated season, he rushed for 625 yards and six touchdowns on 90 carries. At the time of his dismissal, he was locked in a battle with Florida's Emmitt Smith for the SEC's rushing title. His 6.8 yards-per-carry in 1989 led the SEC.

During his career at Tennessee, Cobb rushed 445 times for 2,360 yards and 26 touchdowns, caught 33 passes for 360 yards and three touchdowns, and returned 16 kickoffs for 326 yards. His 1,721 all-purpose yards in 1987 remained a school single-season record until broken by Cordarrelle Patterson in 2012, and his 17 rushing touchdowns in 1987 remains a modern school single-season record. His 1,197 rushing yards in 1987 remains the 9th-highest single-season total in school history, and his 2,360 career rushing yards is the school's 10th-highest career total.

== Professional career ==
In January 1990, Cobb entered the John Lucas New Spirit Recovery Treatment Center in Houston. He was occasionally visited by Tampa Bay coach Ray Perkins, who became one of his advocates. In spite of his past drug use, Tampa Bay took a chance and made Cobb their second-round pick in the 1990 NFL draft. He signed with the Buccaneerss in August 1990. In his first NFL game on September 9, 1990, he rushed 11 times for 43 yards and a touchdown in the Bucs' win over Detroit. His first 100-yard game came on November 10, 1991, when he carried 21 times for 139 yards and three touchdowns, including a 59-yard touchdown run. Two weeks later, he ran 22 times for 110 yards and a 27-yard touchdown in a close loss to the New York Giants. Cobb's best NFL season came in 1992, when he registered four games with 100 or more yards rushing, and finished the season with 1,171 yards rushing and nine touchdowns. In the 1993 season, he had 221 carries for 658 yards and three touchdowns on the ground to go with a receiving touchdown. He did not re-sign with the Bucs after the 1993 season, and became an unrestricted free agent.

Cobb signed with the Green Bay Packers in April 1994. He struggled at the beginning of the season. Green Bay's ground attack ranked 26th in the league at the end of September. In the Packers' loss to Philadelphia on September 18, Cobb scored the team's lone touchdown on a 37-yard pass from Brett Favre. He ran for 66 yards on 13 carries in the Packers' win over Detroit on November 6, and rushed for 78 yards on just 11 tries in the Packers' rout of Chicago on December 11. In his lone trip to the postseason, Cobb had 12 yards on 8 carries and an 18-yard reception in Green Bay's 16–12 win over Detroit on December 31, and was held to just 14 yards on four carries and a 12-yard catch in the Packers' loss to Dallas the following week.

Cobb was selected by the Jacksonville Jaguars in the 1995 NFL expansion draft. He was released by the team after the first game of the season, however. In May 1996, he signed with the New York Jets, where he played primarily as a reserve, scoring one touchdown on the season. He was cut by the Jets at the end of preseason in August 1997.

== NFL career statistics ==
Legend
**Bold**	Career high

Year	Team	GP	Att	Yds	Avg	Lng	TD	Rec	Yds	Avg	Lng	TD
1990	TB	16	151	480	3.2	17	2	**39**	**299**	7.7	17	0
1991	TB	16	196	752	**3.8**	**59**	7	15	111	7.4	21	0
1992	TB	16	**310**	**1,171**	**3.8**	25	**9**	21	156	7.4	27	0
1993	TB	12	221	658	3.0	16	3	9	61	6.8	19	**1**
1994	GB	16	153	579	**3.8**	30	3	35	**299**	**8.5**	**37**	**1**
1995	JAX	1	9	18	2.0	5	0	0	0	0.0	0	0
1996	NYJ	15	25	85	3.4	9	1	4	23	5.8	12	0
Career		92	1,065	3,743	3.6	59	25	123	949	7.7	37	2

== Post-playing career ==
Following his NFL playing career, Cobb entered the scouting profession with the help of fellow ex-Vol (and current senior personnel executive for the Miami Dolphins) Reggie McKenzie. Cobb joined the Washington Redskins administration as a scout in 2001, and subsequently worked for six years as Tampa Bay's Southwestern regional scout. He joined the San Francisco 49ers, where he was the team's Western regional scout, in 2009. In 2011, he was named NFC scout of the year by the Fritz Pollard Alliance.

In July 2011, Cobb was inducted into the Greater Knoxville Sports Hall of Fame. Cobb died in Santa Clara, California from a heart attack due to one of his arteries being 80% blocked on April 20, 2019, at the age of 50.
