= Vinny Testaverde =

American football player (born 1963)

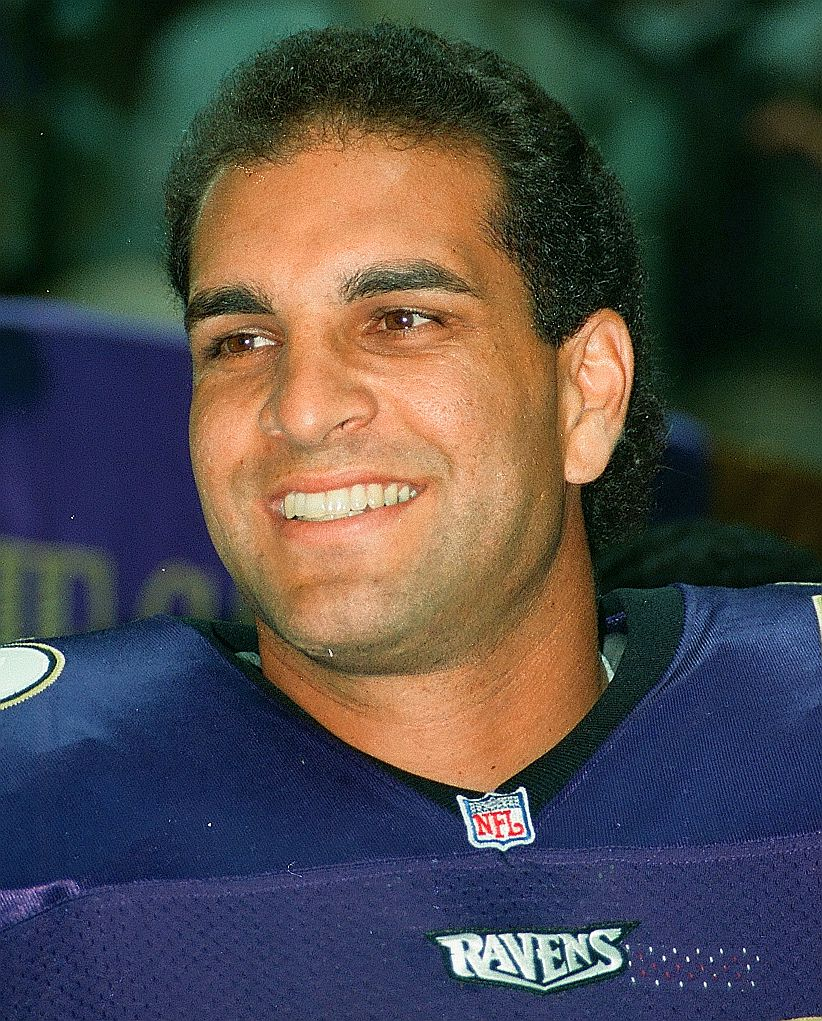
- Testaverde with the Baltimore Ravens in 1996

No. 14, 12, 16
- Position: Quarterback

Personal information
- Born: November 13, 1963 (age 62); Brooklyn, New York, U.S.
- Listed height: 6 ft 5 in (1.96 m)
- Listed weight: 233 lb (106 kg)

Career information
- High school: Sewanhaka (Floral Park, New York)
- College: Miami (FL) (1982–1986)
- NFL draft: 1987: 1st round, 1st overall pick

Career history
- Tampa Bay Buccaneers (1987–1992); Cleveland Browns (1993–1995); Baltimore Ravens (1996–1997); New York Jets (1998–2003); Dallas Cowboys (2004); New York Jets (2005); New England Patriots (2006); Carolina Panthers (2007)

Awards and highlights
- 2× Pro Bowl (1996, 1998); PFWA All-Rookie Team (1987); National champion (1983); Heisman Trophy (1986); Unanimous All-American (1986); Second-team All-American (1985); Miami Hurricanes No. 14 retired

Career NFL statistics
- Passing attempts: 6,701
- Passing completions: 3,787
- Completion percentage: 56.5%
- TD–INT: 275–267
- Passing yards: 46,233
- Passer rating: 75
- Rushing yards: 1,661
- Rushing touchdowns: 15
- Stats at Pro Football Reference
- College Football Hall of Fame

Vincent Frank Testaverde Sr. (/tɛstəˈvɜːrdi/; born November 13, 1963) is an American former professional football quarterback who played in the National Football League (NFL) for 21 seasons. He played college football for the Miami Hurricanes, earning consensus All-American honors and winning the Heisman Trophy in 1986.

Testaverde was selected by the Tampa Bay Buccaneers with the first overall pick of the 1987 NFL draft. After leaving as a free agent, he signed with the Cleveland Browns and was among the people taken away to play for the new Baltimore Ravens during the team's controversial move. He then joined the New York Jets, where he achieved his greatest success. In the last four seasons of his career, he played for the Dallas Cowboys, the Jets for a second time, New England Patriots, and Carolina Panthers for one year each.

Testaverde's professional career is principally noted for its duration: 21 seasons with seven teams. He finished in the top 10 in most career passing statistics: 6th in career passing yardage, 7th in career touchdown passes, 6th in career completions. But he holds the NFL records for losses as a starting quarterback (123) and lowest career regular-season winning percentage for any quarterback with at least 70 wins (42.3%). He started five postseason games in his NFL career with a record of 2–3. Testaverde was known for his strong arm and high volume, but was also known for his frequent interceptions. Testaverde threw more than 20 interceptions in four of his 21 seasons; during his second season with the Buccaneers, he threw 35 interceptions.

== Early life ==
Testaverde was born in Brooklyn, New York City. While living in Elmont, New York, on Long Island, Testaverde attended Sewanhaka High School in Floral Park, and graduated in 1981. He then attended Fork Union Military Academy in Fork Union, Virginia for a post-graduate year of college preparatory work. Growing up, he was a fan of the New York Jets.

== College career ==
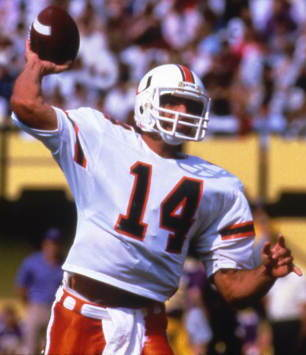
Testaverde with the Miami Hurricanes in 1986

Testaverde accepted an athletic scholarship to attend the University of Miami, where he played for the Miami Hurricanes football team from 1982 to 1986. He redshirted as a freshman, backed up Bernie Kosar for the next two seasons, and became the starter in 1985. As a senior in 1986, he was a Unanimous First-team All-American and won the Heisman Trophy, on his way to becoming the Hurricanes' all-time leader in career touchdown passes with 48. In addition to the Heisman Trophy, he also won the Davey O'Brien Award, the Maxwell Award, the Sammy Baugh Trophy, and the Walter Camp Player of the Year Award. His 26 touchdown passes and passer rating of 165.8 in the 1986 season led major college football. He played in the 1987 Fiesta Bowl against Penn State for the 1986 national championship, a game in which the Miami Hurricanes were heavily favored but lost 14–10 in a game in which Testaverde threw five interceptions.

Testaverde played an important part in the University of Miami's history as one of the top college football programs of the 1980s and 1990s. Along with Jim Kelly, Mark Richt, Bernie Kosar, Steve Walsh, Gino Torretta, Craig Erickson, and Ken Dorsey, Testaverde is considered part of the University of Miami's quarterback dynasty, and was inducted into the University of Miami Sports Hall of Fame in 1998. On May 7, 2013, he was inducted into the College Football Hall of Fame.

== Professional career ==
Pre-draft measurables
Height	Weight	Arm length	Hand span	40-yard dash	10-yard split	20-yard split	Bench press
6 ft 4 1/4 in (1.94 m)	213 lb (97 kg)	33 1/2 in (0.85 m)	10 in (0.25 m)	4.75 s	1.63 s	2.75 s	13 reps
All values from NFL Combine

=== Tampa Bay Buccaneers ===
Testaverde was selected as the first overall draft pick by the Tampa Bay Buccaneers in the 1987 NFL draft. He made his NFL debut in Week 2, throwing four passes in a 20–3 loss to the Chicago Bears. He made his first start in a Week 13 loss to the Saints. He scored his first NFL touchdown on a one-yard rush and he threw his first passing touchdown on a 37-yard pass to Mark Carrier. In his second season, Testaverde struggled heavily with a 47.6% completion rate for 3,240 yards, 13 touchdowns, and 35 interceptions. His 35 interceptions were the second most of any quarterback in a single season in NFL history. During his tenure in Tampa, Testaverde received taunts from fans and radio personalities about his color blindness. In 1988, a radio station in Tampa rented a billboard that had Testaverde standing in front of a blue background. The billboard read: "Vinny thinks this is orange!" The high number of errors caused his intelligence to be called into question. National Football League Players Association president Gene Upshaw, unaware that his comments could be heard by anyone viewing through a direct satellite uplink, once commented during an NFL Live! commercial break that Testaverde was so dumb that he would drag the electric cord through his swimming pool while trimming the hedges, and claimed himself to be a better quarterback (Upshaw was a retired offensive guard) than Testaverde.

In the 1989 season, Testaverde started all 14 games and passed for over 3,000 yards and 20 touchdowns. While Testaverde significantly reduced his interception total in 1989, he again led the league with 22. His numbers continued to improve, and in the 1992 season, his last with Tampa Bay, he threw for a 57.5% completion rate for 2,554 yards, 14 touchdowns, and 16 interceptions.

=== Cleveland Browns ===
Testaverde signed as an unrestricted free agent with the Cleveland Browns in 1993. After spending half a season as a backup to his former Hurricanes teammate Bernie Kosar, he became the starter after Kosar's release by then Browns head coach Bill Belichick. Testaverde spent three seasons in Cleveland, and in 1994 led the team to an 11–5 record and a playoff appearance, where they won the AFC Wild Card Round game against New England before being defeated by Pittsburgh in the Divisional Round. Testaverde started on and off for the Browns during the 1995 season, where the team dropped to a 5–11 record and missed the playoffs. Testaverde was part of controversial Cleveland Browns move to Baltimore.

=== Baltimore Ravens ===
In 1996, most of the players and personnel that made up the Cleveland Browns organization moved to Baltimore, establishing the Baltimore Ravens. Testaverde played two seasons with the newly formed team. He scored the first touchdown in the history of the Ravens on a nine-yard run and ended the season with over 4,000 passing yards, 33 passing touchdowns, and 19 interceptions. Testaverde made his first Pro Bowl appearance in 1996, with the Ravens.

Said football statistics site Football Outsiders of Testaverde's unlikely 1996 season, "The real reason the Ravens ranked first in rushing [efficiency] was, believe it or not, Vinny Testaverde, who was out of his gourd as a scrambler that season. Ignore the official stats and take out the kneels, and Testaverde had 197 yards on just 23 carries, 8.6 yards per carry. He scrambled seven times on third down with 5–10 yards to go and converted six of those. He scrambled six times on a 1st-and-10 and gained a new first down five times. Testaverde had not rushed for 100 yards since 1992."

Testaverde signed a restructured four-year contract with the Ravens ahead of the 1997 season. Ravens owner Art Modell complimented Testaverde on his loyalty to the team and his acceptance of the city of Baltimore. However, Testaverde did not perform as well in 1997 as he did the previous year. He threw 18 touchdowns and 15 interceptions, and was replaced by backup Eric Zeier after suffering an injury. Zeier led the Ravens to two consecutive victories and become popular with the fans. After trading for Indianapolis Colts quarterback Jim Harbaugh, the Ravens released Testaverde prior to the 1998 season. While Modell and Ravens coach Ted Marchibroda complimented Testaverde and said that he would start elsewhere in the NFL, Testaverde and his agent were dissatisfied with the way that his release was conducted.

=== New York Jets (first stint) ===
In 1998, his first season with his hometown New York Jets, Testaverde began the season as the second-string quarterback behind starter Glenn Foley, whose rib injury in Week 2 made him the starter. Testaverde flourished in his first start, throwing four touchdown passes against the Indianapolis Colts and winning two straight games for the Jets. The recovered Foley was named the starter by head coach Bill Parcells for their Week 6 game against the St. Louis Rams, but after a miserable 5-of-15 outing, he was benched and replaced by Testaverde, who remained the starter for the rest of the season. He went 12–1 in 13 games as a starter, completing 61.5% of his passes with 29 touchdowns, seven interceptions, and a 101.6 quarterback rating, making the Pro Bowl for the second time.

In a December game against the Seattle Seahawks, Testaverde was involved in a play that was cited as an impetus for the NFL's adoption of a new instant replay review system the next season. With the Jets trailing 31–26 and twenty seconds left in the game, Testaverde attempted to score on a quarterback sneak on fourth and goal from the Seattle five-yard line. Testaverde had been tackled and the ball was not across the goal line when this happened, but because Testaverde's helmet had crossed the line the game's head linesman, Earnie Frantz, ruled the play a touchdown. The Jets won the game 32–31 and the loss was said to have cost the Seahawks a playoff berth and coach Dennis Erickson his job.

In spite of the controversy, Testaverde's 1998 season was arguably his best season in the NFL. With him under center, the Jets won the AFC East for the first time since the merger and earned a first-round bye, and a home Divisional Round playoff game against Jacksonville. In the AFC Championship that year, they lost to the eventual Super Bowl champion Denver Broncos 23–10.

The Jets had Super Bowl aspirations entering the 1999 season. However, in the first game of the season, against the New England Patriots, Testaverde suffered a ruptured Achilles tendon and did not play for the rest of the season.

In 2000, Testaverde returned as the Jets quarterback. The highlight of the season was the "Monday Night Miracle" game against the Miami Dolphins on October 23, 2000, selected by fans as the greatest game in Monday Night Football history. In that game, the Jets fell behind 30–7 going into the fourth quarter, but came back to win the game, 40–37 behind five touchdown passes from Testaverde, including one each to Laveranues Coles, Jermaine Wiggins, Jumbo Elliott, and two to Wayne Chrebet. In the regular season finale against the Ravens, he passed for a career-high 481 yards, two touchdowns, and three interceptions in the loss. In the 2000 season, he led the Jets to a 9–7 record but missed the postseason. He finished with 3,732 yards, 21 touchdowns, and 25 interceptions.

Following the departure of head coach Al Groh, Testaverde had a new coach in Herm Edwards. In 2001, Testaverde led the Jets back to the playoffs, where they lost in the Wild Card Round to the Oakland Raiders 38–24. Testaverde was efficient in the loss, passing for three touchdowns and no interceptions. In 2002, he was replaced after a 1–3 start by Chad Pennington. He made cameo appearances to take the last snap in both the playoff-clinching game versus the Green Bay Packers and the 41–0 Wild Card Round win against the Indianapolis Colts. In 2003, he was assigned to a backup role behind Pennington, although he started the first six games due to Pennington's left wrist injury.

=== Dallas Cowboys ===
Despite his injuries, Testaverde's performance with the Jets endeared him to Bill Parcells, who retired from coaching in 1999. One year after Parcells was lured out of retirement by Dallas Cowboys owner Jerry Jones, he brought Testaverde to the Cowboys in 2004.

Testaverde initially was signed to be a backup and mentor to young Cowboys quarterback Quincy Carter, but after Carter was abruptly cut by the Cowboys for allegedly failing a drug test, Testaverde was given the starting quarterback job. While many questioned his ability to still play in the NFL, the protection schemes and play-calling allowed him to showcase his arm, although with mixed results. He was able to throw for significant yardage, but led the league in interceptions, getting picked off on 4% of his passes. Dallas finished the 2004 season 6–10, for third place in the NFC East.

Testaverde's one-year contract with the Cowboys expired early in 2005. The Cowboys chose to instead sign Parcells' 1993 number one draft pick, Drew Bledsoe, as their top quarterback, leaving Testaverde without a contract. Parcells cites Testaverde's presence in Dallas as having been important to the development of eventual starter Tony Romo. At the time, Testaverde's 3,532 passing yards and 297 completions were the third-best total of his career and the third-most passing yards in Dallas Cowboys franchise history. He also tied the franchise record for 300-yard passing games in a season with three and became the fifth quarterback in league history to pass for over 300 yards at 40 years old.

=== New York Jets (second stint) ===
As injuries on September 25, 2005 knocked both Chad Pennington and backup Jay Fiedler out for the 2005 season, the New York Jets re-signed Testaverde on September 27, 2005. Testaverde was named the Jets' starting quarterback in week five of the 2005 season, in a home game against the team that originally drafted him, the Tampa Bay Buccaneers.

On December 26, against the New England Patriots on the final ABC telecast of Monday Night Football, Testaverde set a new NFL record for most consecutive seasons with at least one touchdown pass, 19, by throwing a 27-yard pass to Laveranues Coles to secure the record. That pass is also notable as being the last touchdown pass thrown on Monday Night Football while it was still broadcast by ABC. The game was also notable because the Patriots sent in back-up quarterback Doug Flutie, making this the first game in NFL history in which two quarterbacks over the age of 40 completed a pass (Testaverde was 42, Flutie was 43).

=== New England Patriots ===
On November 14, 2006, the New England Patriots signed Testaverde as a backup to starter Tom Brady. Testaverde kneeled down for the final play in a victory against the Packers on November 19, 2006. Testaverde threw a touchdown pass to Troy Brown on December 31, 2006, against the Tennessee Titans, giving him at least one touchdown pass for the twentieth straight season, extending his NFL record. The Patriots defeated the Jets, Testaverde's former team, in the first round of the playoffs, and Testaverde took the last couple of snaps to run out the clock.

Testaverde wore #14 with the Patriots, the second time the number has been re-issued since Steve Grogan's retirement as P.K. Sam wore it earlier in the decade.

On May 29, 2007, Testaverde stated his interest in returning to the Patriots for the 2007 NFL season, and on July 13, 2007, confirmed this with Sporting News Radio. He officially signed a 1-year contract for $825,000 on August 18, 2007, but was released on September 1, 2007.

=== Carolina Panthers ===
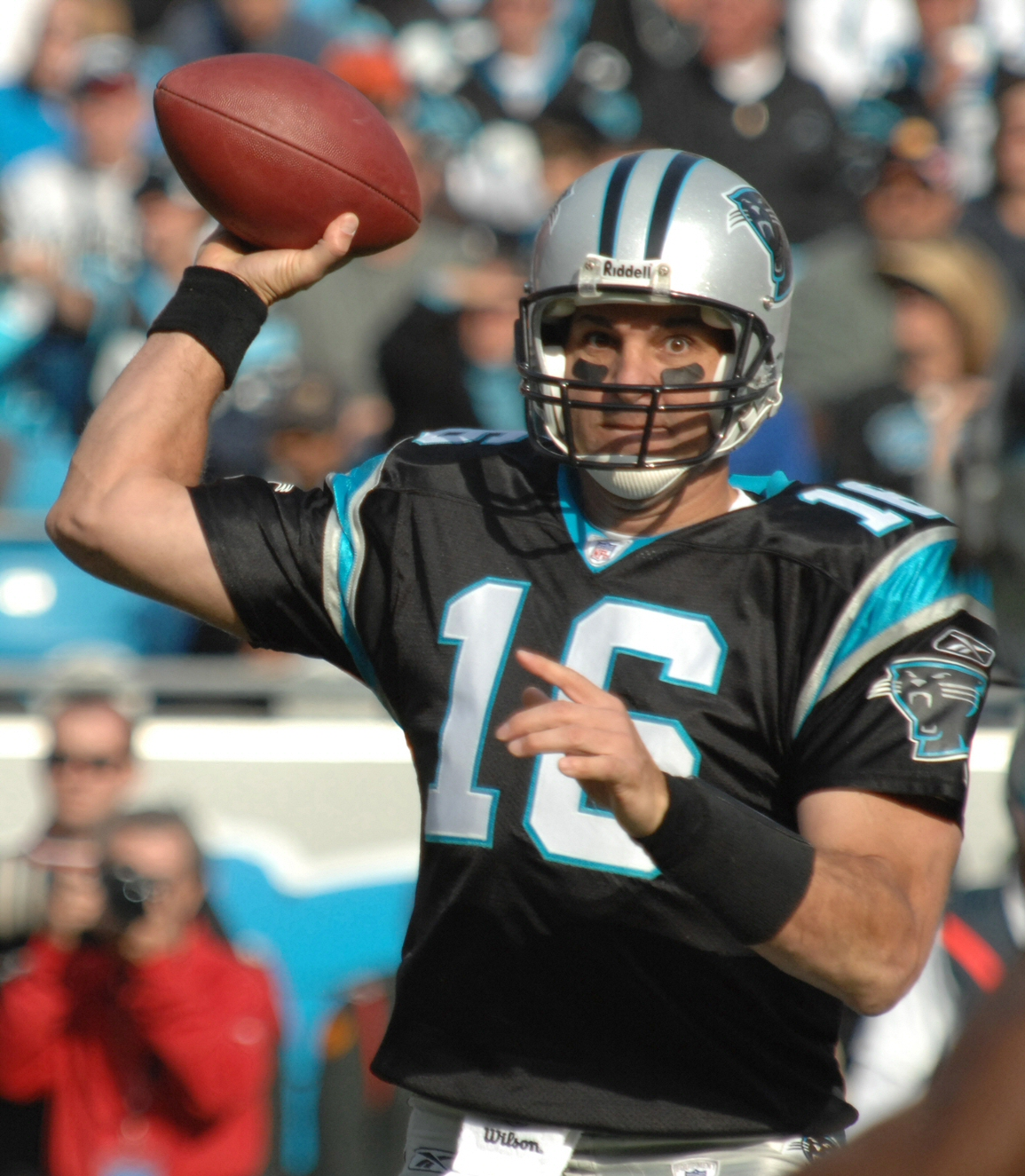
Testaverde with the Carolina Panthers in November 2007

With Jake Delhomme out for the 2007 season due to an elbow injury he suffered in a Week 3 victory over the Atlanta Falcons, and David Carr out with a sore back, the Panthers signed Testaverde on October 10, 2007. Testaverde, wearing #16, started his first game with the team on October 14, 2007, against the Arizona Cardinals. In that game, he threw a 65-yard touchdown pass to Steve Smith, extending his NFL record to 21 consecutive seasons with a touchdown pass. After leading the Panthers to a 25–10 victory, the 43-year-old became the oldest starting quarterback to win a game in NFL history, and the third-oldest to start one. He has also thrown touchdown passes to 71 different players, a record since broken by Tom Brady. On October 28, coach John Fox named Testaverde the starting quarterback against the Indianapolis Colts. In that game, Testaverde led the Panthers in the longest opening drive for a touchdown in franchise history, consisting of 18 plays and lasting over 11 minutes. Despite winning time of possession in the first half of the game, the Panthers entered the locker room under a 3-point deficit. In the second half, Testaverde left the field with a strained Achilles tendon, and was replaced by former Houston Texans quarterback David Carr. Ultimately, the Panthers lost 31–7. Reports said that Testaverde would be out for at least a week.

On November 18, Testaverde and the Panthers played at Lambeau Field against Brett Favre and the Green Bay Packers for their Week 11 matchup. With Testaverde at 44 years old and Favre at 38 years old, this was the oldest starting quarterback duo in any game in NFL history. The "Senior Bowl", as it was nicknamed in the media, was won by the Packers 31–17.

On December 2, Testaverde became the second-oldest starting quarterback in NFL history at 44 years and 19 days old. He threw two touchdown passes against the San Francisco 49ers in the Panthers' win, breaking his own record for the oldest starter to win an NFL game. During this game, Testaverde and Dante Rosario became the passer/receiver duo with the largest age gap between them (20 years, 346 days) to connect for a touchdown.

Testaverde announced his plans for retirement on December 29, which would take effect after the final game of the season against the Tampa Bay Buccaneers on December 30.

Panthers head coach John Fox sent him into the game to take the final kneel-down snap in a game which the Panthers won 31–23, expectantly bringing to an end to the 44-year-old's 21-year NFL career at the same city he was originally drafted. He officially announced his retirement from professional football in January 2008.

=== Legacy ===
Despite his long career and overall statistical achievements, Testaverde only had moderate success in terms of wins and losses. During the regular season as a starter, he led his teams to 90 wins, 123 losses, and one tie. He led his team to the postseason on three occasions, with an overall postseason record of 2–3, reaching the AFC Championship Game once. A journeyman quarterback who played on seven different teams, Testaverde holds several NFL records related to his longevity in the league, including the NFL record for having thrown a touchdown pass in 21 consecutive seasons, the most losses by a starting quarterback with 123, and throwing touchdown passes to an NFL record 70 different players (broken by Tom Brady in 2018). He had one of the highest completion percentages in a single game during the regular season (at least 20 attempts) at 91.3% (21/23), in 1993, against the Los Angeles Rams. Testaverde's one-time record has since been broken multiple times, with Drew Brees now holding the record at 96.7%.

As a player, Testaverde was commended for his arm strength but criticized for his lack of mobility and tendency to commit turnovers.

== Career statistics ==
Legend
**Bold**	Career high

=== NFL ===
==== Regular season ====
Year	Team	Games			Passing								Rushing				Sacks		Fumbles	
Year	Team	GP	GS	Record	Cmp	Att	Pct	Yds	Avg	TD	Int	Rtg	Att	Yds	Avg	TD	Sck	SckY	Fum	Lost
1987	TB	6	4	0–4	71	165	43.0	1,081	6.6	5	6	60.2	13	50	3.8	1	18	140	7	2
1988	TB	15	15	5–10	222	466	47.6	3,240	7.0	13	**35**	48.8	28	138	4.9	1	33	292	9	5
1989	TB	14	14	5–9	258	480	53.8	3,133	6.5	20	22	68.9	25	139	5.6	0	**38**	294	4	2
1990	TB	14	13	6–7	203	365	55.6	2,818	7.7	17	18	75.6	**38**	**280**	7.4	1	**38**	**330**	10	0
1991	TB	13	12	3–9	166	326	50.9	1,994	6.1	8	15	59.0	32	101	3.2	0	35	234	6	2
1992	TB	14	14	5–9	206	358	57.5	2,554	7.1	14	16	74.2	36	197	5.5	**2**	35	259	4	1
1993	CLE	10	6	3–3	130	230	56.5	1,797	7.8	14	9	85.7	18	74	4.1	0	17	101	4	3
1994	CLE	14	13	9–4	207	376	55.1	2,575	6.8	16	18	70.7	21	37	1.8	**2**	12	83	3	2
1995	CLE	13	12	4–8	241	392	61.5	2,883	7.4	17	10	87.8	18	62	3.4	**2**	17	87	4	1
1996	BAL	16	16	4–12	325	549	59.2	**4,177**	7.6	**33**	19	88.7	34	188	5.5	**2**	34	270	9	**7**
1997	BAL	13	13	4–8–1	271	470	57.7	2,971	6.3	18	15	75.9	34	138	4.1	0	20	129	11	3
1998	NYJ	14	13	**12–1**	259	421	61.5	3,256	7.7	29	7	101.6	24	104	4.3	1	19	140	7	3
1999	NYJ	1	1	0–1	10	15	**66.7**	96	6.4	1	1	78.7	0	0	—	0	0	0	0	0
2000	NYJ	16	16	9–7	**328**	**590**	55.6	3,732	6.3	21	25	69.0	25	32	1.3	0	13	71	7	5
2001	NYJ	16	16	10–6	260	441	59.0	2,752	6.2	15	14	75.3	31	25	0.8	0	18	122	**12**	2
2002	NYJ	5	4	1–3	54	83	65.1	499	6.0	3	3	78.3	2	23	**11.5**	0	9	62	2	2
2003	NYJ	7	7	2–5	123	198	62.1	1,385	7.0	7	2	90.6	6	17	2.8	0	6	48	1	0
2004	DAL	16	15	5–10	297	495	60.0	3,532	7.1	17	20	76.4	21	38	1.8	1	34	182	8	4
2005	NYJ	6	4	1–3	60	106	56.6	777	7.3	1	6	59.4	7	4	0.6	**2**	12	102	8	6
2006	NE	3	0	—	2	3	**66.7**	29	**9.7**	1	0	**137.5**	8	−8	−1.0	0	0	0	0	0
2007	CAR	7	6	2–4	94	172	54.7	952	5.5	5	6	65.8	9	22	2.4	0	9	46	3	1
Career		233	214	90–123–1	3,787	6,701	56.5	46,233	6.9	275	267	75.0	430	1,661	3.9	15	417	2,992	119	51

==== Postseason ====
Year	Team	Games			Passing								Rushing				Sacks		Fumbles	
Year	Team	GP	GS	Record	Cmp	Att	Pct	Yds	Avg	TD	Int	Rtg	Att	Yds	Avg	TD	Sck	SckY	Fum	Lost
1994	CLE	2	2	**1–1**	33	61	54.1	412	6.8	2	2	72.6	**5**	**19**	**3.8**	0	**4**	**27**	0	0
1998	NYJ	2	2	**1–1**	**55**	**88**	62.5	**640**	**7.3**	1	**3**	74.1	1	−1	−1.0	0	2	6	0	0
2001	NYJ	1	1	0–1	26	40	**65.0**	268	6.7	**3**	0	**109.2**	1	1	1.0	0	1	3	0	0
2002	NYJ	1	0	—	0	0	—	0	—	0	0	—	2	−2	−1.0	0	0	0	0	0
2006	NE	1	0	—	0	0	—	0	—	0	0	—	1	−1	−1.0	0	0	0	0	0
Career		7	5	2–3	114	189	60.3	1,320	7.0	6	5	81.0	10	16	1.6	0	7	36	0	0

=== College ===
Season	Team	Passing						
Season	Team	Cmp	Att	Pct	Yds	TD	Int	Rtg
1982	Miami	5	12	41.7	79	1	0	124.5
1983	Miami	Redshirt						
1984	Miami	17	34	50	184	0	1	89.6
1985	Miami	**216**	**352**	61.4	**3,238**	21	**15**	149.8
1986	Miami	175	276	**63.4**	2,557	**26**	9	**165.8**
Career		413	674	61.3	6,058	48	25	152.9

== Career highlights ==
=== Awards and honors ===
NFL

- 2× Pro Bowl (1996, 1998)
- PFW All-AFC (1998)
- 2× AFC Passing Touchdowns Leader (1996, 1998)
- AFC Passer Rating Leader (1998)
- 4× AFC Offensive Player of the Week (Week 17, 1993, Week 9, 1996, Week 7, 1998, Week 15, 2001)
- 2× NFC Offensive Player of the Week (Week 1, 1989, Week 2, 1992)
- 3× AFC Offensive Player of the Month (September 1995, November 1998, December 1998)
- NFC Offensive Player of the Month (September 1990)

College

- National champion (1983)
- Heisman Trophy (1986)
- Maxwell Award (1986)
- Walter Camp Award (1986)
- Davey O'Brien Award (1986)
- Sammy Baugh Trophy (1986)
- SN Player of the Year (1986)
- UPI Player of the Year (1986)
- Unanimous All-American (1986)
- Second-team All-American (1985)
- NCAA passing touchdowns leader (1986)
- NCAA passer rating leader (1986)
- Miami Hurricanes No. 14 retired

Hall of Fames

- Inducted into the Florida Sports Hall of Fame (2006).
- Inducted into the College Football Hall of Fame (2013)
- Inducted into the Long Island Sports Hall of Fame (1987)

=== Records ===
==== NFL ====
- Most losses as a starting quarterback (123 tied with Matthew Stafford)

==== Buccaneers franchise records ====
- Most times sacked (197)
- Most interceptions thrown in a season (35 in 1987)
- Most interceptions thrown in a career – 112 (1987–1992)

==== New York Jets franchise records ====
- Most 4th quarter comeback wins in a single season – 5 (2001)
- Most game winning drives in a single season – 5 (2001) (tied with three others)
- Most passing attempts in a single season – 590 (2000)
- Most passing attempts in one game – 69 (December 24, 2000, against the Ravens)
- Most pass completions in one game – 42 (December 6, 1998, against the Seahawks) (tied with Richard Todd)

== Personal life ==
Testaverde is currently the quarterbacks coach at Jesuit High School of Tampa, where his son Vincent Jr. attended. He and his wife, Mitzi, have two daughters, Alicia and Madeleine, and a son, Vincent Jr; they live in Tampa, Florida. Vincent Jr. played college football as a quarterback for the SUNY Albany Great Danes; he signed with the Tampa Bay Buccaneers as an undrafted free agent following the 2019 NFL draft and had a short stint with the Tampa Bay Vipers of the XFL.

On September 18, 2025, the University of Miami announced that Max Chira, a UM fan, has made a $1.81 million donation that will be used to construct life-sized statues of Gino Torretta and Testaverde on campus outside the Schwartz Center for Athletic Excellence.

== See also ==
- List of first overall National Football League draft picks
- List of NCAA major college football yearly passing leaders
- List of Tampa Bay Buccaneers first-round draft picks
