= Ron Hall (tight end) =

American football player (1964–2007)

No. 82, 89
- Position: Tight end

Personal information
- Born: March 15, 1964; Fort Huachuca, Arizona, U.S.
- Died: May 19, 2007 (aged 43); Costa Rica
- Listed height: 6 ft 4 in (1.93 m)
- Listed weight: 245 lb (111 kg)

Career information
- High school: San Pasqual (Escondido, California)
- College: Cal Poly-Pomona; Hawaii
- NFL draft: 1987: 4th round, 87th overall pick

Career history
- Tampa Bay Buccaneers (1987–1993); Detroit Lions (1994–1995)

Career NFL statistics
- Receptions: 230
- Receiving yards: 2,609
- Touchdowns: 10
- Stats at Pro Football Reference

Ronald Edwin Hall (March 15, 1964 – May 19, 2007) was an American professional football player who was selected 87th overall by the Tampa Bay Buccaneers in the fourth round of the 1987 NFL draft.

Pre-draft measurables
Height	Weight	Arm length	Hand span	40-yard dash	10-yard split	20-yard split	20-yard shuttle	Vertical jump	Broad jump	Bench press
6 ft 4 1/8 in (1.93 m)	239 lb (108 kg)	32 in (0.81 m)	10 in (0.25 m)	4.71 s	1.61 s	2.72 s	4.14 s	28.5 in (0.72 m)	9 ft 3 in (2.82 m)	20 reps
All values from NFL Combine

A 6 ft 4 in (1.93 m), 238 lbs. tight end from the University of Hawaii, Hall played in 9 NFL seasons from 1987 to 1995. He died in 2007 in Costa Rica from natural causes according to his mother.

== NFL career statistics ==
Legend
**Bold**	Career high

Year	Team	Games		Receiving				
Year	Team	GP	GS	Rec	Yds	Avg	Lng	TD
1987	TAM	10	3	16	169	10.6	29	1
1988	TAM	15	14	**39**	**555**	14.2	37	0
1989	TAM	**16**	15	30	331	11.0	32	2
1990	TAM	**16**	**16**	31	464	**15.0**	**54**	2
1991	TAM	15	15	31	284	9.2	24	0
1992	TAM	12	11	**39**	351	9.0	32	**4**
1993	TAM	**16**	**16**	23	268	11.7	37	1
1994	DET	13	10	10	106	10.6	18	0
1995	DET	6	6	11	81	7.4	15	0
Career		119	106	230	2,609	11.3	54	10
