= Tyji Armstrong =

American football player (born 1970)

No. 86, 81, 89
- Position: Tight end

Personal information
- Born: October 3, 1970 (age 56); Inkster, Michigan, U.S.
- Listed height: 6 ft 4 in (1.93 m)
- Listed weight: 250 lb (113 kg)

Career information
- High school: Dearborn Heights (MI) Robichaud
- College: Mississippi
- NFL draft: 1992: 3rd round, 79th overall pick

Career history
- Tampa Bay Buccaneers (1992–1995); Dallas Cowboys (1996); St. Louis Rams (1998); Dallas Cowboys (2000)*; Chicago Enforcers (2001)
- * Offseason or practice squad member only

Awards and highlights
- First-team All-SEC (1991)

Career NFL statistics
- Receptions: 53
- Receiving yards: 621
- Touchdowns: 3
- Stats at Pro Football Reference

Tyji Donrapheal Armstrong (born October 3, 1970) is an American former professional football player who was a tight end in the National Football League (NFL) for the Tampa Bay Buccaneers, Dallas Cowboys, and St. Louis Rams. He also was a member of the Chicago Enforcers in the XFL league. He played college football at the University of Mississippi.

== Early life ==
Armstrong attended Robichaud High School, before moving on to Iowa Central Junior College.

After his sophomore season he transferred to the University of Mississippi, where he was a two-year starter as a blocking tight end. As a junior, he was a backup behind Camp Roberts, making 5 receptions for 84 yards (16.8-yard average). As a senior, he registered 16 receptions (fifth on the team) for 304 yards (19-yard avg.) and one touchdown. He finished his college career with 21 receptions for 388 yards (18.5-yard avg.) and one touchdown.

== Professional career ==
=== Tampa Bay Buccaneers ===
Armstrong was selected by the Tampa Bay Buccaneers in the third round (79th overall) of the 1992 NFL draft. As a rookie, he started 7 games and although he was mostly used as a blocking tight end, he was a part of one of the longest passing plays in franchise history, an 81-yard touchdown reception against the Los Angeles Rams on December 6. In 1992 and 1993 he was a backup to Ron Hall, and from 1994 to 1995 to Jackie Harris. He was waived on August 25, 1996.

=== Dallas Cowboys (first stint) ===
On August 27, 1996, the Dallas Cowboys signed him for blocking purposes after tight end Kendell Watkins was lost for the season. He appeared in 16 games with 7 starts, registering 2 receptions for 10 yards. He announced his retirement after the Cowboys didn't re-sign him and selected David LaFleur in the first round of the 1997 NFL draft.

=== St. Louis Rams ===
On July 19, 1998, he was signed by the St. Louis Rams as a free agent. He played as a backup in 12 games, while making 6 receptions for 54 yards. He retired at the end of the season because he felt that he should be starting over rookie tight end Ernie Conwell.

=== Dallas Cowboys (second stint) ===
On August 17, 2000, he was signed as a free agent by the Dallas Cowboys. On August 27, he was released to make room for tight end O.J. Santiago.

=== Chicago Enforcers ===
In 2001, he signed with the Chicago Enforcers of the XFL league and was coached under Ron Meyer. He posted 6 receptions for 49 yards and played with the team until the league folded at the end of its debut season.

== Personal life ==
His mother suffered a fatal heart attack while watching him play against the Chicago Bears on October 18, 1992.
