= Ricky Reynolds =

American football player (born 1965)

No. 21, 29
- Position: Cornerback

Personal information
- Born: January 19, 1965 (age 61); Sacramento, California, U.S.
- Listed height: 5 ft 11 in (1.80 m)
- Listed weight: 190 lb (86 kg)

Career information
- High school: Sacramento (CA) Burbank
- College: Washington State (1983–1986)
- NFL draft: 1987: 2nd round, 36th overall pick

Career history
- Tampa Bay Buccaneers (1987–1993); New England Patriots (1994–1996)

Career NFL statistics
- Interceptions: 23
- Interception yards: 198
- Touchdowns: 5
- Stats at Pro Football Reference

Derrick Scott Reynolds (born January 19, 1965) is an American former professional football player who was a cornerback for 10 seasons in the National Football League (NFL). He played college football for the Washington State Cougars.

== Early life ==
Reynolds graduated from Luther Burbank High School in Sacramento, California in 1983.

== Professional career ==
Pre-draft measurables
Height	Weight	Arm length	Hand span	40-yard dash	10-yard split	20-yard split	20-yard shuttle	Vertical jump	Broad jump	Bench press
5 ft 11 5/8 in (1.82 m)	182 lb (83 kg)	29 1/2 in (0.75 m)	8 3/4 in (0.22 m)	4.48 s	1.53 s	2.55 s	4.17 s	30.5 in (0.77 m)	9 ft 9 in (2.97 m)	16 reps
All values from NFL Combine

He was selected by the Tampa Bay Buccaneers in the second round of the 1987 NFL draft. Over the course of his career from 1987 to 1996 with the Tampa Bay Buccaneers and New England Patriots, Reynolds totaled 23 interceptions, two of which he returned for touchdowns. Reynolds spent most of his year as a left-side cornerback, though he played the right side in 1993 for the Buccaneers and in 1996 for the Patriots. Reynolds also returned two fumble recoveries for touchdowns and returned a blocked field goal attempt for a touchdown.

== NFL career statistics ==
Legend
**Bold**	Career high

=== Regular season ===
Year	Team	Games		Tackles				Interceptions				Fumbles			
Year	Team	GP	GS	Comb	Solo	Ast	Sck	Int	Yds	TD	Lng	FF	FR	Yds	TD
1987	TAM	12	12	70	-	-	0.0	0	0	0	0	**2**	0	0	0
1988	TAM	**16**	**16**	74	-	-	0.0	4	7	0	7	1	2	0	0
1989	TAM	**16**	15	71	-	-	0.0	**5**	**87**	**1**	**68**	**2**	2	0	0
1990	TAM	15	15	49	-	-	0.0	3	70	0	46	0	2	0	0
1991	TAM	**16**	**16**	45	-	-	1.0	2	7	0	7	1	0	0	0
1992	TAM	**16**	**16**	65	-	-	1.0	2	0	0	0	1	2	11	**1**
1993	TAM	14	13	60	-	-	1.0	1	3	0	3	1	0	0	0
1994	NWE	15	10	57	50	7	2.0	1	11	**1**	11	1	**3**	**25**	**1**
1995	NWE	**16**	**16**	**85**	**68**	**17**	**2.5**	3	6	0	4	**2**	1	0	0
1996	NWE	11	9	32	25	7	0.0	2	7	0	7	0	0	0	0
Career		147	138	608	143	31	7.5	23	198	2	68	11	12	36	2

=== Playoffs ===
Year	Team	Games		Tackles				Interceptions				Fumbles			
Year	Team	GP	GS	Comb	Solo	Ast	Sck	Int	Yds	TD	Lng	FF	FR	Yds	TD
1994	NWE	1	1	7	7	0	0.0	0	0	0	0	0	0	0	0
Career		1	1	7	7	0	0.0	0	0	0	0	0	0	0	0
