= Al Chamblee =

American football player (born 1968)

No. 57
- Position: Linebacker

Personal information
- Born: November 17, 1968 (age 57); Virginia Beach, Virginia, U.S.
- Listed height: 6 ft 1 in (1.85 m)
- Listed weight: 240 lb (109 kg)

Career information
- High school: Green Run (Virginia Beach)
- College: Virginia Tech
- NFL draft: 1991: 12th round, 314th overall pick

Career history
- Tampa Bay Buccaneers (1991–1992)

Career NFL statistics
- Sacks: 2
- Stats at Pro Football Reference

Aldric Doran Chamblee (born November 17, 1968) is an American former professional football player who was a linebacker for the Tampa Bay Buccaneers of the National Football League (NFL) from 1991 to 1992. He played college football for the Virginia Tech Hokies and was selected by the Buccaneers in the 12th round of the 1991 NFL draft.
