= Gay Culverhouse =

American football executive (1947–2020)

- Born: February 5, 1947; Montgomery, Alabama, U.S.
- Died: July 1, 2020 (aged 73); Fernandina Beach, Florida, U.S.
- Education: University of Florida (degree in special education); Columbia University (doctorate in special education)
- Known for: President of the Tampa Bay Buccaneers and Notre Dame College
- Children: 2

Gay Culverhouse (February 5, 1947 – July 1, 2020) was president of the Tampa Bay Buccaneers from 1991 to 1994 while her father, Hugh Culverhouse, owned the team. Inspired by Tom McHale, a former Buccaneers player who suffered from chronic traumatic encephalopathy, Culverhouse founded the Gay Culverhouse Players Outreach Program, which helps retired NFL players access earned benefits from the National Football League. Culverhouse is the author of Throwaway Players: The Concussion Crisis from Pee Wee Football to the NFL.

In 1996, she served a brief term as president of Notre Dame College in South Euclid, Ohio. She died on July 1, 2020, at age 73 of complications of myelofibrosis.
