= Darren Anderson (American football) =

American football player (born 1969)

No. 25, 44, 26
- Position: Cornerback

Personal information
- Born: January 11, 1969 (age 57); Cincinnati, Ohio, U.S.
- Listed height: 5 ft 10 in (1.78 m)
- Listed weight: 185 lb (84 kg)

Career information
- High school: Walnut Hills High School (Cincinnati, Ohio)
- College: Toledo
- NFL draft: 1992: 4th round, 93rd overall pick

Career history

Playing
- New England Patriots (1992); Tampa Bay Buccaneers (1992–1993); Kansas City Chiefs (1994–1997); Atlanta Falcons (1998)

Operations
- Detroit Lions (2012–2016) College scout

Career NFL statistics
- Tackles: 56
- Interceptions: 2
- Fumble recoveries: 2
- Stats at Pro Football Reference

Darren Anderson is an American former professional football player who was a cornerback in the National Football League (NFL) for seven seasons. He played for the New England Patriots, Tampa Bay Buccaneers, Kansas City Chiefs, and Atlanta Falcons. He played college football at Toledo and was selected by the Patriots in the fourth round of the 1992 NFL draft. Anderson worked as a college scout for the Detroit Lions from 2012 to 2016.
