= Reggie Burnette =

American football player (born 1968)

Reginald Burnette
No. 55, 56, 50
- Position: Linebacker

Personal information
- Born: October 4, 1968; Rayville, Louisiana, U.S.
- Listed height: 6 ft 2 in (1.88 m)
- Listed weight: 240 lb (109 kg)

Career information
- High school: Rayville
- College: Houston
- NFL draft: 1991: 7th round, 17th overall pick

Career history
- Green Bay Packers (1991); Tampa Bay Buccaneers (1992–1993)

Awards and highlights
- Second-team All-SWC (1990)
- Stats at Pro Football Reference

Reginald Burnette (born October 4, 1968) is an American former professional football player who was a linebacker in the National Football League (NFL). He played college football for the Houston Cougars.

== Early life ==
Burnette was born in Rayville, Louisiana. He attended the University of Houston.

== Career ==
Burnette was selected in the seventh round of the 1991 NFL draft by the Green Bay Packers. Burnette played three seasons in the NFL in the early 1990s. He played for the Green Bay Packers in 1991 and played for the Tampa Bay Buccaneers in 1992 and 1993.
