= Joe King (safety) =

American football player (born 1968)

No. 31, 41, 43
- Position: Safety

Personal information
- Born: May 7, 1968 (age 58); Dallas, Texas, U.S.
- Listed height: 6 ft 2 in (1.88 m)
- Listed weight: 195 lb (88 kg)

Career information
- High school: South Oak (Dallas)
- College: Oklahoma State
- NFL draft: 1991: undrafted

Career history
- Cincinnati Bengals (1991); Cleveland Browns (1991); Tampa Bay Buccaneers (1992–1993); Oakland Raiders (1995)

Career NFL statistics
- Tackles: 88
- Interceptions: 5
- Fumble recoveries: 2
- Stats at Pro Football Reference

Joe Derek King is an American former professional football player who was a safety for five seasons in the National Football League (NFL) for the Cincinnati Bengals, the Cleveland Browns, the Tampa Bay Buccaneers, and the Oakland Raiders. He played college football for the Oklahoma State Cowboys. King is the cousin of former NFL player Roddrick Muckelroy.

== Early life ==
King was born in Dallas, Texas, and went to high school at South Oak Cliff High School, where he played Quarterback. During a recruiting trip to Oklahoma State University, he decided to attend college there and play for the Cowboys. While he envisioned playing quarterback for them, he was moved to the position of defensive back.

== Music career ==
King is also a country music singer who performs in Texas and various other states. One of his original songs, "Wide Open Places" was included on the soundtrack for the motion picture, Sing For Their Supper that goes to support Street Music Week in Spokane, Washington.

King took a break from performing live, but has recently re-released his single, "Down In Stillwater Oklahoma" on streaming platforms.

In September 2020, Joe King recorded his EP entitled, "Starting Over Again" at the Studios At Fischer in Fischer, Texas. Benny McArthur, a longtime member of George Strait's Ace In The Hole Band produced the project. Five songs were recorded for the EP. Those songs are Down In Stillwater Oklahoma, Drinkin' Doubles, Have Another Beer, Running To Stay, and Starting Over Again.

Joe King released, "Down In Stillwater Oklahoma" as his debut single to radio on November 10, 2020. The song charted the next week on the Texas Regional Radio Report. It stayed on the Texas Regional Radio Report chart for 26 weeks and peaked at number 24. King also released, "Have Another Beer" to digital streaming platforms in early 2021, but did not release it to radio.

King released, "Drinkin' Doubles" in September 2021 to radio. Although the song did not climb as high as Down In Stillwater Oklahoma, it did hit the top 30, peaking at number 27 on the Texas Regional Radio Report chart and maintained a presence on the Texas Regional Radio Report chart for 25 weeks.
