= Mark Wheeler =

American football player (born 1970)

No. 77, 97
- Position: Defensive tackle

Personal information
- Born: April 1, 1970 (age 56); San Marcos, Texas, U.S.
- Listed height: 6 ft 3 in (1.91 m)
- Listed weight: 285 lb (129 kg)

Career information
- High school: San Marcos
- College: Texas A&M
- NFL draft: 1992: 3rd round, 59th overall pick

Career history
- Tampa Bay Buccaneers (1992–1995); New England Patriots (1996–1998); Philadelphia Eagles (1999)

Career NFL statistics
- Tackles: 277
- Sacks: 16
- Forced fumbles: 2
- Fumble recoveries: 2
- Stats at Pro Football Reference

Mark Anthony Wheeler (born April 1, 1970) is an American former professional football player who was a defensive tackle for eight seasons in the National Football League (NFL) for the Tampa Bay Buccaneers, New England Patriots, and Philadelphia Eagles. He started in Super Bowl XXXI for the Patriots. Wheeler played college football at Texas A&M University and was selected in the third round of the 1992 NFL draft with the 59th overall pick.

The Patriots lost Wheeler and linebacker Todd Collins to free agency in the 1999 offseason. As compensation, they received the 199th pick in the 2000 NFL draft, which the Patriots used to draft Tom Brady.
