= Ray Seals =

American football player (1965–2025)

No. 98, 97, 99
- Position: Defensive end

Personal information
- Born: June 17, 1965; Syracuse, New York, U.S.
- Died: April 4, 2025 (aged 59); Tampa, Florida, U.S.
- Listed height: 6 ft 3 in (1.91 m)
- Listed weight: 293 lb (133 kg)

Career information
- High school: Henninger (Syracuse)

Career history
- Syracuse Express (1986–1987); Tampa Bay Buccaneers (1988–1990); Detroit Lions (1990); Indianapolis Colts (1990); Tampa Bay Buccaneers (1991–1993); Pittsburgh Steelers (1994–1996); Carolina Panthers (1997); Cincinnati Bengals (1998)*
- * Offseason or practice squad member only
- Stats at Pro Football Reference

Raymond Bernard Seals (June 17, 1965 – April 4, 2025) was an American professional football player who was a defensive end in the National Football League (NFL). He was notable for being one of the rare players to have made it to the NFL without ever having to attend college. Seals started in Super Bowl XXX as a member of the Pittsburgh Steelers.

== Playing career ==
Seals lettered in football at Anthony A. Henninger High School in Syracuse, New York.

Seals went from playing for the minor-league Syracuse Express of the Empire Football League to the Tampa Bay Buccaneers in 1989. He went to the Steelers in 1994 as a free agent and played two seasons as their starting right defensive end. He was injured in 1996, his third season with the Steelers, and finished with Carolina in 1997.

Raymond was famous for batting away a pass by then rookie quarterback Brett Favre, only to have it be caught by Favre himself, for the first completion in his long and storied career.

== Personal life and death ==
Seals was inducted into the American Football Association's Semi-Pro Football Hall of Fame in 1992. Seals's cousin, Jonny Gammage, was killed after a traffic stop by Brentwood police officers in 1995.

Seals died in Tampa, Florida on April 4, 2025, at the age of 59.
