= Roger Jones (American football) =

American football player (born 1969)

No. 24, 38
- Position: Cornerback

Personal information
- Born: April 22, 1969 (age 57); Cleveland, Ohio, U.S.
- Listed height: 5 ft 9 in (1.75 m)
- Listed weight: 175 lb (79 kg)

Career information
- High school: Pearl-Cohn (Nashville, Tennessee)
- College: Tennessee State
- NFL draft: 1991: undrafted

Career history
- Indianapolis Colts (1991)*; Tampa Bay Buccaneers (1991–1993); Cincinnati Bengals (1994–1997); Tennessee Oilers (1997)
- * Offseason or practice squad member only

Career NFL statistics
- Tackles: 185
- Sacks: 4.5
- Interceptions: 3
- Stats at Pro Football Reference

Roger Carver Jones (born April 22, 1969) is an American former professional football player who was a cornerback for seven seasons in the National Football League (NFL) for the Tampa Bay Buccaneers, Cincinnati Bengals, and Tennessee Oilers. He played college football for the Tennessee State Tigers.

Upon the completion of his NFL career, he joined the coaching staff at Pope John Paul II High School in Hendersonville, Tennessee, serving as the school's head track coach and assistant athletic director
