= Rhett Hall =

American football player (born 1968)

No. 66, 91, 97
- Positions: Defensive end, defensive tackle

Personal information
- Born: December 5, 1968 (age 57); San Jose, California, U.S.
- Listed height: 6 ft 3 in (1.91 m)
- Listed weight: 276 lb (125 kg)

Career information
- High school: Live Oak (Morgan Hill, California)
- College: California
- NFL draft: 1991: 6th round, 147th overall pick

Career history
- Tampa Bay Buccaneers (1991–1993); San Francisco 49ers (1994); Philadelphia Eagles (1995–1998)

Awards and highlights
- Super Bowl champion (XXIX); 2× Second-team All-Pac-10 (1990), (1989)

Career NFL statistics
- Tackles: 141
- Sacks: 18.5
- Fumble recoveries: 3
- Stats at Pro Football Reference

Rhett Floyd Hall (born December 5, 1968) is an American former professional football player who was a defensive lineman for eight seasons in the National Football League (NFL) for the Tampa Bay Buccaneers, San Francisco 49ers, and Philadelphia Eagles. He played in Super Bowl XXIX for the 49ers. He played college football for the California Golden Bears and was selected in the sixth round of the 1991 NFL draft.

Hall's son Cade played defensive line for the San Jose State Spartans. In 2020, Cade led the Mountain West Conference in sacks and was named MWC Defensive Player of the Year.
