= Tom McHale (American football) =

American football player (1963–2008)

No. 99, 73, 68, 72
- Position: Guard

Personal information
- Born: February 25, 1963; Boston, Massachusetts, U.S.
- Died: May 25, 2008 (aged 45); Wesley Chapel, Florida, U.S.
- Listed height: 6 ft 4 in (1.93 m)
- Listed weight: 290 lb (132 kg)

Career information
- High school: Gaithersburg (Gaithersburg, Maryland)
- College: Maryland, Cornell
- NFL draft: 1987: undrafted

Career history
- Tampa Bay Buccaneers (1987–1992); Philadelphia Eagles (1993–1994); Atlanta Falcons (1995)*; Miami Dolphins (1995)
- * Offseason or practice squad member only

Career NFL statistics
- Games played: 87
- Games started: 23
- Fumble recoveries: 1
- Stats at Pro Football Reference

Thomas McHale (February 25, 1963 – May 25, 2008) was an American professional football player. He played as an offensive guard in the National Football League (NFL) with the Tampa Bay Buccaneers (1987–1992), Philadelphia Eagles (1993–1994) and Miami Dolphins (1995). Born in Gaithersburg, Maryland, he attended Gaithersburg High School and then Wyoming Seminary in Kingston, Pennsylvania, before playing college football at Maryland (1983) and Cornell (1986), graduating from the Cornell University School of Hotel Administration. Playing as a defensive end, he was named all-Ivy League and first-team All-American in 1986, and was runner-up for Ivy League Player of the Year. He was named to the Cornell Athletic Hall of Fame in 1993.

== Death ==
On the morning of May 25, 2008, McHale was found dead at age 45 at the home of a friend in Wesley Chapel, Florida. The cause of death was recorded as an accidental drug overdose.

An examination of McHale's brain at Boston University's School of Medicine found that McHale had chronic traumatic encephalopathy (CTE), a condition found in several other NFL veterans who had received repeated hits to the head, some of which may have caused concussions. He is one of at least 345 NFL players to be diagnosed after death with this disease. His widow, Lisa McHale, now works as a family relations liaison at the Boston University CTE Center.
