= Broderick Thomas =

American football player (born 1967)

No. 51
- Positions: Defensive end, linebacker

Personal information
- Born: February 20, 1967 (age 59); Houston, Texas, U.S.
- Listed height: 6 ft 4 in (1.93 m)
- Listed weight: 254 lb (115 kg)

Career information
- High school: Madison (Houston)
- College: Nebraska (1985–1988)
- NFL draft: 1989: 1st round, 6th overall pick

Career history
- Tampa Bay Buccaneers (1989–1993); Detroit Lions (1994); Minnesota Vikings (1995); Dallas Cowboys (1996–1998)

Awards and highlights
- Unanimous All-American (1988); First-team All-American (1987); Big Eight Defensive Player of the Year (1988); 3× First-team All-Big Eight (1986, 1987, 1988); Nebraska All-Century team

Career NFL statistics
- Games played: 144
- Sacks: 47.5
- Interceptions: 2
- Touchdowns: 1
- Stats at Pro Football Reference

Broderick Lee Thomas (born February 20, 1967) is an American former professional football player who was a linebacker in the National Football League (NFL) for the Tampa Bay Buccaneers, Detroit Lions, Minnesota Vikings, and Dallas Cowboys. He played college football for the Nebraska Cornhuskers, earning unanimous All-American honors in 1988.

== Early life ==
Thomas was born in Houston, Texas. He graduated from Madison High School in Houston in 1985. He played as a defensive end. As a senior, he received All-American, All-state and Area defensive player-of-the-year (by the Houston Post) honors.

== College career ==
Thomas accepted a football scholarship from the University of Nebraska–Lincoln. Although he had never played linebacker before, he was converted into an outside linebacker, which was one of his conditions for coming to Nebraska.

He played eight games as a true freshman, registering 13 tackles (8 solo) and 2 sacks. The next year, he became a starter and was a part of the second nationally ranked defense, recording 58 tackles (third on the team), 4 sacks, a single-season record of 6 fumble recoveries and a single-game record of 3 sacks against Colorado.

As a junior, he played at linebacker and defensive end, collecting 73 tackles, 6.5 sacks (fifth in the Big Eight), 3 passes defensed, 2 forced fumbles, 2 fumble recoveries and one interception.

As a senior, he registered 98 tackles, 10 sacks, 35 quarterback pressures, 6 passes defensed, while helping his team win the Big Eight championship and earn an Orange Bowl invitation for the first time in five years. He called himself "Sandman", because he "put running backs to sleep".

He is considered to be one of the greatest defensive players in the history of Nebraska football and was also named to the Nebraska All-Century team.

== Professional career ==
Pre-draft measurables
Height	Weight	40-yard dash	10-yard split	20-yard split
6 ft 2 1/4 in (1.89 m)	253 lb (115 kg)	4.61 s	1.62 s	2.71 s
All values from NFL Combine

=== Tampa Bay Buccaneers ===
Thomas was selected by the Tampa Bay Buccaneers in the first round (sixth overall) of the 1989 NFL draft. He was projected as an outside linebacker or defensive end, but he played middle linebacker in a 4-3 defense as a rookie and experienced problems learning the system. He was a backup player, making 27 tackles, two sacks and one forced fumble.

In 1990, he was named the starter at outside linebacker, posting 72 tackles, 7.5 sacks (led the team) and 33 quarterback pressures (led the team). Against the Dallas Cowboys, he tied a club record with three sacks, including two on consecutive plays.

His best season came in 1991 after being shot in the upper chest and right arm during the offseason. He finished with 174 tackles (tied franchise record), 11 sacks (led the team), 22 quarterback pressures (second on the team), 10 tackles for loss (led the team), 7 forced fumbles (tied franchise record), 2 fumble recoveries and received Pro Bowl consideration. Against the Philadelphia Eagles, he set a club record with 21 tackles, while also making one sack and three tackles for loss. He earned NFC Defensive Player of the Week honors after collecting 11 tackles, 2 sacks, 3 passes defended and 2 fumble recoveries against the Detroit Lions.

In 1992, Thomas reported out of shape for training camp and struggled with his pass coverage responsibilities as an outside linebacker in the team's new 3-4 defense. He tallied 113 tackles (third on the team), 5 sacks (tied for second on the team), 8 tackles for loss (second on the team), 3 fumble recoveries (led the team) and 8 passes defensed.

In 1993, he registered 75 tackles (fourth on the team), one sack and 8 quarterback pressures (third on the team). His playing time was reduced to eight starts while platooning with Jimmy Williams, starting at right linebacker against the Giants and at left linebacker in seven of the next eight games. On May 31, 1994, he was waived in a salary-cap move.

=== Detroit Lions ===
On July 15, 1994, Thomas signed as a free agent with the Detroit Lions. He finished with 85 tackles (fourth on the team) and 7 sacks (led the team).

=== Minnesota Vikings ===
On March 9, 1995, Thomas signed as a free agent with the Minnesota Vikings. He recorded 86 tackles (second on the team), 6 sacks, 6 tackles for loss and 7 passes defensed. He was released on February 9, 1996 after being charged with possession of an unauthorized handgun and drunk driving.

=== Dallas Cowboys ===
On March 22, 1996, Thomas was signed by the Dallas Cowboys as a free agent to replace Dixon Edwards, who in turn signed with the Vikings to replace Thomas. In the season's final six games, he was moved to defensive end after Charles Haley underwent season-ending back surgery, finishing with 65 tackles, 4.5 sacks (tied for second on the team), 5 tackles for loss, 20 quarterback pressures (tied for third on the team), 4 passes defensed and 3 fumble recoveries (led the team).

In 1997, Thomas played as a backup defensive end, registering 31 tackles, 3.5 sacks (fourth on the team) and 10 quarterback pressures (led the team). The next year, he was placed on the injured reserve list after tearing ligaments in his left knee during a Sunday training-camp practice. He was not resigned after the season, finishing his career with a streak of 144 consecutive games played.

== Personal life ==
Thomas is married to Yvonne Thomas and is the nephew of former Chicago Bears linebacker and San Francisco 49ers head coach Mike Singletary. His son Broderick Jr. also attended Madison High School in Houston, where he played quarterback. His son Elijah plays basketball and football. Thomas resides in Missouri City, Texas.
