= Tony Covington =

American football player (born 1967)

No. 25, 27
- Position: Safety

Personal information
- Born: December 26, 1967 (age 58); Winston-Salem, North Carolina, U.S.
- Listed height: 5 ft 11 in (1.80 m)
- Listed weight: 192 lb (87 kg)

Career information
- High school: Parkland (Winston-Salem)
- College: Virginia
- NFL draft: 1991: 4th round, 93rd overall pick

Career history
- Tampa Bay Buccaneers (1991–1994); Seattle Seahawks (1995); Tampa Bay Storm (1999)

Awards and highlights
- 2× Second-team All-ACC (1989, 1990)

Career NFL statistics
- Tackles: 124
- Interceptions: 4
- Sacks: 1
- Stats at Pro Football Reference
- Stats at ArenaFan.com

Anthony Lavonne Covington (born December 26, 1967) is an American former professional football player who was a safety in the National Football League (NFL) and Arena Football League (AFL). He was selected by the Tampa Bay Buccaneers in the fourth round of the 1991 NFL draft. He played college football for the Virginia Cavaliers.

Covington also played for the Seattle Seahawks and Tampa Bay Storm.

He currently works as the radio color commentator for University of Virginia football broadcasts.
