= Craig Erickson =

American football player (born 1969)

No. 7
- Position: Quarterback

Personal information
- Born: May 17, 1969 (age 57); Boynton Beach, Florida, U.S.
- Listed height: 6 ft 2 in (1.88 m)
- Listed weight: 213 lb (97 kg)

Career information
- High school: Cardinal Newman (West Palm Beach, Florida)
- College: Miami (FL)
- NFL draft: 1991: 5th round, 131st overall pick

Career history
- Tampa Bay Buccaneers (1992–1994); Indianapolis Colts (1995); Miami Dolphins (1996–1998); Chicago Bears (1999)

Awards and highlights
- 2× National champion (1987, 1989); Johnny Unitas Golden Arm Award (1990)

Career NFL statistics
- Passing attempts: 1,092
- Passing completions: 591
- Completion percentage: 54.1%
- TD–INT: 41–38
- Passing yards: 7,625
- Passer rating: 74.3
- Rushing yards: 201
- Rushing touchdowns: 1
- Stats at Pro Football Reference

Craig Neil Erickson (born May 17, 1969) is an American former professional football player who was a quarterback in the National Football League (NFL). Prior to entering the NFL, he played college football for the Miami Hurricanes. He was selected by the Philadelphia Eagles in the fifth round of the 1991 NFL draft and also by the Tampa Bay Buccaneers in the fourth round of the 1992 NFL draft. He is one of the few NFL players to be drafted twice (Bo Jackson is another example). Coincidentally, each was drafted by the Tampa Bay Buccaneers.

== College career ==
Erickson attended Cardinal Newman High School in West Palm Beach and then the University of Miami. A 6'2", 200 lb (91 kg) quarterback from the University of Miami who was the starting quarterback on Miami's 1989 National Championship squad, he ranked third on the Hurricanes all-time career passing-yardage list with 6,056 yards.

Erickson played in 34 games over a four-year career, taking over the starting role as a junior. He won the Johnny Unitas Golden Arm Award in 1990.

=== Statistics ===
Year	Comp	Att	Comp %	Passing	TD	INT	Rtg
1987	22	37	59.5	307	2	0	147.0
1988	26	49	53.1	379	6	1	154.4
1989	147	273	53.8	2,007	16	13	125.4
1990	225	393	57.3	3,363	22	7	144.0

== Professional career ==
Erickson played in seven National Football League season seasons, from 1992 to 1998. His best year as a pro came during the 1993 season for the Tampa Bay Buccaneers, when he threw for over 3,000 yards and 18 touchdowns. He had a litany of injuries in his playing career, ranging from a knuckle injury in college that changed his throwing motion, a torn anterior cruciate ligament (ACL) in his knee that had him miss what would've been his rookie season in 1991.

Erickson is known as one of the few professional athletes outside of baseball who came back from Tommy John surgery, having suffered the injury in 1998. He tried playing in the 1999 preseason but did not make it back to regular season play.
