= Charles McRae =

American football player (born 1968)

No. 70, 73
- Position: Offensive tackle

Personal information
- Born: September 16, 1968 (age 58); Oscoda, Michigan, U.S.
- Listed height: 6 ft 7 in (2.01 m)
- Listed weight: 305 lb (138 kg)

Career information
- High school: Clinton (TN)
- College: Tennessee
- NFL draft: 1991: 1st round, 7th overall pick

Career history
- Tampa Bay Buccaneers (1991–1995); Oakland Raiders (1996)

Awards and highlights
- Third-team All-American (1990); First-team All-SEC (1990); Second-team All-SEC (1989)

Career NFL statistics
- Games played: 84
- Games started: 39
- Stats at Pro Football Reference

Charles Edward McRae (born September 16, 1968) is an American former professional football player who was an offensive tackle in the National Football League (NFL). He played college football for the Tennessee Volunteers. He spent five seasons with the NFL's Tampa Bay Buccaneers, starting 38 at right tackle and left guard before finishing his career with the Oakland Raiders. After his football career, McRae became a healthcare executive, serving in senior leadership roles at Radiology Partners, Envision Healthcare, and Cardiovascular Logistics (CVL), where he serves as chief operating officer.

== Early life ==
McRae was born at Wurtsmith Air Force Base in Oscoda Township, Michigan, on September 16, 1968, and moved to Clinton, Tennessee, at the age of seven where he was a two-year starter in football and basketball at Clinton Senior High School.

Accolades

On September 4, 2003, Charles McRae was named one of the "Legends of the Game" with teammate Tony Thompson and was recognized before the Tennessee - Marshall football game at Neyland Stadium.

In 2008, McRae was inducted into the Anderson County, TN Hall of Fame.

On October 28, 2011, Charles McRae was inducted into the Clinton High School "Wall of Fame."

On August 4, 2015, Charles joined the Greater Knoxville Sports Hall of Fame.

In January 2026, McRae was announced as a member of the Tennessee Sports Hall of Fame Class of 2026, alongside former Tennessee teammates Antone Davis and the late Reggie Cobb. The induction ceremony is scheduled for July 11, 2026, at the Omni Nashville Downtown.

== College career ==
McRae played football at the University of Tennessee, first as a defensive lineman under coach Ken Donahue and the last two and a half years as offensive tackle under offensive coordinator and line coach, Phillip Fulmer, earning All-SEC and Academic All-SEC honors. McRae studied physics, computer science, and history, graduating with a bachelor's degree in history in May 1991.

== Professional career ==
McRae was selected in the first round of the 1991 NFL draft by the Tampa Bay Buccaneers with the seventh overall pick and was the first offensive player selected. When his Volunteers teammate Antone Davis was selected with the eighth pick, it marked the first time in NFL Draft history that one school produced two top-10 selected offensive tackles in the same year. Charles signed with the Oakland Raiders in March 1996 as an unrestricted free agent where he spent one year as an offensive tackle and guard.

== Business/post athletic career ==
McRae returned to the University of Tennessee's Haslam College of Business in 2000 and earned a Master of Business Administration (MBA) degree in December 2002.

Upon graduation, McRae was chosen to be the first Administrator for Vista Radiology, PC, in March 2003, a position he held until October 2011. November 2011, McRae joined Columbus Radiology as CEO. Columbus Radiology was acquired by Radiology Partners in August 2016. In April 2022, Charles joined Envision Healthcare and served as president of the anesthesiology business unit. McRae subsequently joined Cardiovascular Logistics (CVL) as chief operating officer, overseeing the platform's operational infrastructure and integration across its national network of cardiovascular practices.

In June 2013, Charles McRae was elected to the board of directors of the Radiology Business Management Association (RBMA) and appointed to serve as Chair of the RBMA's Radiology Integration Models Task Force. He served multiple terms on the RBMA board, including as director at large for the 2017–2018 and 2018–2019 terms.

In October 2024, McRae was elected to the national board of directors of the NFL Alumni Association.

== Personal ==
Charles is married to Lori Baxter. In addition to working and playing with his seven children, McRae is a licensed pilot, PADI scuba certified, boater, and outdoorsman.
