= Rob Taylor (American football) =

American football player (born 1960)

No. 75, 71, 72
- Position: Offensive tackle

Personal information
- Born: November 14, 1960 (age 65); St. Charles, Illinois, U.S.
- Listed height: 6 ft 6 in (1.98 m)
- Listed weight: 293 lb (133 kg)

Career information
- High school: Kettering (OH) Fairmont East
- College: Northwestern
- NFL draft: 1982: 12th round, 328th overall pick

Career history
- Chicago Blitz (1983); Arizona Wranglers (1984); Houston Gamblers (1985); Tampa Bay Buccaneers (1986–1993)

Career NFL statistics
- Games played: 110
- Games started: 91
- Fumble recoveries: 1
- Stats at Pro Football Reference

Robert Earl Taylor (born November 14, 1960) is a former NFL offensive tackle who played eight seasons with the Tampa Bay Buccaneers. He was selected 328th overall by the Philadelphia Eagles in the twelfth round of the 1982 NFL draft.

Taylor signed with the Buccaneers in 1986 after coming to Tampa on a vacation with his wife. He went to the team facility to ask for a tryout which was granted, and was signed from the tryout.
