= Tim Ryan (American football, born 1968) =

American football player (born 1968)

No. 64
- Position: Guard

Personal information
- Born: September 2, 1968 (age 58); Kansas City, Missouri, U.S.
- Listed height: 6 ft 2 in (1.88 m)
- Listed weight: 280 lb (127 kg)

Career information
- High school: Rockhurst (Kansas City)
- College: Notre Dame
- NFL draft: 1991: 5th round, 136th overall pick

Career history
- Tampa Bay Buccaneers (1991–1993)

Career NFL statistics
- Games played: 37
- Games started: 1
- Stats at Pro Football Reference

Timothy Thomas Ryan (born September 2, 1968) is an American former professional football player who was a Guard for the Tampa Bay Buccaneers in the National Football League (NFL). He played college football for the Notre Dame Fighting Irish.

Ryan was born on September 2, 1968, in Kansas City, Missouri. He attended Rockhurst High School, where, in 1986, he won the Simone Award for the best high school football player in the Kansas City Metropolitan Area. After Ryan graduated from Rockhurst, he went on to play college football for the Fighting Irish at the University of Notre Dame . At 6'2" and 280 pounds, Ryan would graduate Notre Dame and play for the Tampa Bay Buccaneers from 1991 to 1993. He was selected in the fifth round by the Buccaneers in the 1991 NFL Draft with the 136th overall pick.
