= Jeff FitzGerald =

American football coach

Personal information
- Born: April 18, 1960 (age 66); Burbank, California

Career information
- College: Cal State-Northridge

Career history
- Cincinnati (1985) Graduate assistant; Alabama (1986–1989) Inside linebackers coach; Tampa Bay Buccaneers (1990–1993) Defensive assistant; San Diego State (1994–1997) Linebackers coach; Washington Redskins (1998–1999) Linebackers coach; Arizona Cardinals (2000–2003) Linebackers coach; Baltimore Ravens (2004–2007) Linebackers coach; Cincinnati Bengals (2008–2011) Linebackers coach; Indianapolis Colts (2012–2016) Linebackers coach; DC Defenders (2020) Defensive coordinator

Jeff FitzGerald (born April 18, 1960) is an American former football coach. FitzGerald has previously served as a linebackers coach for the Washington Redskins, Arizona Cardinals, Baltimore Ravens, Cincinnati Bengals, and Indianapolis Colts.

== Coaching career ==
On January 23, 2008, Fitzgerald was named the linebackers coach for the Cincinnati Bengals. Four years later, he joined Chuck Pagano's staff at the Indianapolis Colts in the same capacity, but was fired after the 2016 season.

In 2019, he became the defensive coordinator for the DC Defenders of the XFL.
