= Steve Shafer =

American gridiron football player and coach (born 1940)

Personal information
- Born: December 8, 1940 (age 85); Burbank, California, U.S.
- Listed height: 6 ft 0 in (1.83 m)
- Listed weight: 190 lb (86 kg)

Career information
- High school: Burbank
- College: Utah State
- NFL draft: 1963: 11th round, 148th overall pick

Career history

Playing
- BC Lions (1963–1967)

Coaching
- San Mateo (1968–1972) Defensive coordinator; San Mateo (1973–1974) Head coach; San Diego State (1975–1982) Defensive backs coach; Los Angeles Rams (1983–1990) Defensive backs coach; Tampa Bay Buccaneers (1991–1993) Defensive backs coach; San Diego State (1994) Defensive coordinator; Oakland Raiders (1995–1997) Defensive backs coach; Carolina Panthers (1998) Defensive backs coach; Baltimore Ravens (1999) Defensive backs coach; Baltimore Ravens (2000–2001) Assistant head coach & secondary coach; Jacksonville Jaguars (2003–2004) Assistant head coach

Awards and highlights
- Grey Cup champion (1964); Super Bowl champion (XXXV)

Stephen Edward Shafer (born December 8, 1940) is an American former professional football player and coach who played for the BC Lions, winning the Grey Cup with them in 1964. He played college football at Utah State University and was selected by the San Francisco 49ers in the 1963 NFL draft. He was later a football coach in the National Football League (NFL), over the span of 1983 to 2003 serving on the staffs of the Los Angeles Rams, Tampa Bay Buccaneers, Oakland Raiders, Carolina Panthers, Baltimore Ravens, and Jacksonville Jaguars. He lives in Lincoln, California.

== Head coaching record ==
Year	Team	Overall	Conference	Standing	Bowl/playoffs
San Mateo Bulldogs (Golden Gate Conference) (1973–1974)
1973	San Mateo	8–3–1	5–0–1	1st	L California state large division semifinal
1974	San Mateo	7–3	6–2	2nd	
San Mateo:		15–6–1	11–2–1		
Total:		15–6–1			
National championship Conference title Conference division title or championship game berth
