= Paul Gruber =

American football player (born 1965)

No. 74
- Position: Offensive tackle

Personal information
- Born: February 24, 1965 (age 61); Madison, Wisconsin, U.S.
- Listed height: 6 ft 5 in (1.96 m)
- Listed weight: 292 lb (132 kg)

Career information
- High school: Sauk Prairie (Prairie du Sac, Wisconsin)
- College: Wisconsin (1984–1987)
- NFL draft: 1988: 1st round, 4th overall pick

Career history
- Tampa Bay Buccaneers (1988–1999)

Awards and highlights
- 2× Second-team All-Pro (1991, 1992); PFWA All-Rookie Team (1988); Tampa Bay Buccaneers Ring of Honor; Second-team All-American (1987); First-team All-Big Ten (1987); Second-team All-Big Ten (1986)

Career NFL statistics
- Games played: 183
- Games started: 183
- Fumble recoveries: 9
- Stats at Pro Football Reference

Paul Blake Gruber (born February 24, 1965) is an American former professional football player who was an offensive tackle for the Tampa Bay Buccaneers in the National Football League (NFL). He played college football for the Wisconsin Badgers. He was selected by the Buccaneers with the fourth overall pick in the 1988 NFL draft.

== Professional career ==
Gruber spent his entire NFL career with the Tampa Bay Buccaneers from 1988 to 1999. He never missed a snap in his first five years in the league. Over his 12-year career he appeared in 183 games, starting all of them, which was a Buccaneers record until Derrick Brooks broke it in 2007.

For most of his career, Gruber was one of the few marquee players on a bad team; indeed, his early years were spent on some of the worst teams in Buccaneers history. The Buccaneers had losing records in each of his first nine seasons, including the last seven years of an NFL-record streak of 12-consecutive 10-loss seasons.

He missed the last part of the 1999 season, in which the Buccaneers advanced all the way to the NFC Championship Game, due to a broken leg. The injury was slow to heal in the offseason, which was a factor in his decision to retire during the summer of 2000.

On June 6, 2012, it was announced that Paul Gruber would be the latest member of the Tampa Bay Buccaneer Ring of Honor. Gruber joined Hall of Famer Lee Roy Selmon, former coach John McKay and tight end Jimmie Giles as the fourth inductee into the Ring of Honor, established in 2009.
