= 1988 Tampa Bay Buccaneers season =

NFL team season

- Owner: Hugh Culverhouse
- Head coach: Ray Perkins
- Home stadium: Tampa Stadium

Results
- Record: 5–11
- Division place: 3rd NFC Central
- Playoffs: Did not qualify
- All-Pros: LT Paul Gruber (honorable mention)
- Pro Bowlers: C Randy Grimes (alternate)
- Team MVP: WR Bruce Hill

The 1988 Tampa Bay Buccaneers season was the franchise's 13th season in the National Football League the 13th playing their home games at Tampa Stadium and the 2nd under head coach Ray Perkins. Perkins had by now rebuilt the Buccaneers as the NFL's youngest team, having replaced so many veterans that leadership became an issue. A strong draft produced several starters, including standout offensive tackle Paul Gruber. The team was largely competitive and showed an ability to outplay opponents in the second half of games, but continued their tendency toward mental errors, and finished with a disappointing 5–11 record. Second-year quarterback Vinny Testaverde was inconsistent: an effective leader at times, as in their late-season upset of the AFC-leading Buffalo Bills, mistake-prone at others. His 35 interceptions are still (as of 2017) a team record. His frequent costly errors caused the coaching staff to lose confidence in him, and at one point to replace him with backup Joe Ferguson. The team finished the season on a strong note with wins in two of their final three games, including respectable performances against two playoff contenders.

== Offseason ==
National Football League Players Association figures showed the Buccaneers to have the lowest average salaries in the NFL, despite having one of the league's highest-paid players in Vinny Testaverde. Team assistant Phil Krueger disputed the accuracy of the figures. The team filed suit against former linebacker Hugh Green, saying that he still owed more than half of the signing bonus that he was required to repay as part of his trade to Miami.

Founding coach John McKay was honored with election to the College Football Hall of Fame.

=== Personnel moves ===
The team was especially active in the offseason, with as many as 123 players on the roster over the summer. They had finished the previous season as the league's youngest team, with an average age of 25, and with the release of several veterans were expected to get even younger. The team declined to make qualifying offers to tackle Marvin Powell and punter Frank Garcia, who became free agents with the expiration of their contracts. Powell spoke highly of the team and fondly of his days in Tampa, a sharp contrast with his acrimonious departure from the New York Jets, who were later cleared of charges of unfair labor practices that were filed when the Jets released him a week after he was elected union president. Several free agents were signed during the offseason, including former Hurricanes and Dolphins linebacker Jay Brophy, and former Buccaneer replacement player Harold Ricks. Former starting quarterback Steve DeBerg was traded to the Kansas City Chiefs for safety Mark Robinson and a pair of draft choices. The move was considered to be a calculated risk, because the team gained a draft pick and a player at a problem area, while they lost experience from a young team. The departure of DeBerg, combined with the loss of quarterbacks coach Marc Trestman to the Cleveland Browns, left only Perkins, who also served as the team's head coach, general manager, and offensive coordinator, to coach Testaverde. Robinson, who had been unable to break into the Chiefs’ starting lineup behind Deron Cherry and Lloyd Burruss, reunited with Chiefs’ secondary coach Doug Graber, now the defensive coordinator at Tampa Bay.

The team's initial qualifying offers to Scot Brantley, George Yarno, and Bobby Kemp were later withdrawn. Injuries had affected Brantley's play over the last several years. Kemp had started all non-strike games the previous season, but was released due to his lack of speed. Yarno requested the release so that he might have a chance to catch on with another team after being told that his chances of making the team were poor. Several of the previous season's backups were released, including Steve Bartalo, Charles Gladman, Harold Ricks, Conrad Goode, and Mike Stensrud. Ricks and Gladman were replacement players who had been retained by the team when regular play resumed. Kicker Van Tiffin and defensive back Rodney Bellinger were signed as free agents. They were also rumored to be interested in acquiring receiver Wes Chandler from San Diego. Buffalo Bills linebacker Eugene Marve was acquired for a 1989 draft pick. Marve was a longtime Bills starter who was made expendable by the drafting of Shane Conlan. Perkins later referred to the trade as an "absolute steal". The acquisition of Marve allowed the team to release their leading tackler Jeff Davis, whose request for a trade they had been unable to accommodate.

=== Coaching changes ===
The Buccaneers’ 1988 coaching staff was nearly identical to their 1987 staff, with the exception of Perkins taking over the quarterback-coaching duties from the departed Marc Trestman, and the addition of Mike Shula as an offensive assistant. Shula became the NFL's youngest assistant coach, having been a draft pick of the team the previous year. Perkins had close ties to Shula, having coached him in college, and having been coached by his father, Don Shula, as a receiver with the Baltimore Colts. Shula assumed some of the responsibility for coaching Vinny Testaverde, although Shula was 17 months younger than Testaverde and was drafted in the same year.

=== NFL draft ===
A pair of draft-day trades gained the Buccaneers two extra fourth-round picks; Perkins reasoning that after the first dozen or so selections, the talent level is fairly similar between the next 100 players.

Pick	Round	Player	Position	School
4	1	Paul Gruber	Offensive tackle	Wisconsin
53	2 (from San Francisco)	Lars Tate	Running Back	Georgia
83	4 (from Philadelphia)	Robert Goff	Defensive End	Auburn
86	4 (from Kansas City)	John Bruhin	Guard	Tennessee
107	4 (from San Francisco)	Monte Robbins	Punter	Michigan
113	5	William Howard	Running Back	Tennessee
163	6 (from San Francisco)	Shawn Lee	Defensive Tackle	North Alabama
167	7	Kerry Goode	Running Back	Alabama
198	8	Anthony Simpson	Running Back	East Carolina
225	9	Reuben Davis	Defensive End	North Carolina
279	11	Frank Pillow	Wide Receiver	Tennessee State
310	12	Victor Jones	Inside Linebacker	Virginia Tech

The Buccaneers traded their second-round pick, the 30th overall, to the Philadelphia Eagles for their second- and fourth-round picks, the 39th- and 83rd-overall. The second-round pick at #39 was then traded to the San Francisco 49ers for their second- and fourth- round picks, the 53rd- and 108th-overall. The Buccaneers also had Kansas City's fourth- and eighth-round picks, from the Steve DeBerg trade. The sixth-round pick used to select Shawn Lee came from the 49ers in exchange for Keith Browner. The Buccaneers’ original fourth-round pick had been traded to New England, for a 1987 fifth-round pick. Their third-round pick was used to select Dan Sileo in a 1987 supplemental draft.

=== Draft selections ===
Despite pre-draft talk that they would select South Carolina wide receiver Sterling Sharpe with their fourth-overall pick, the Buccaneers took Wisconsin tackle Paul Gruber. Gruber was considered to be the best offensive lineman in the draft, and Perkins said that he would have drafted Gruber even if the Buccaneers had the first overall selection. Perkins had never drafted an offensive lineman higher than the fourth round, but left tackle had been a problem spot the previous season, and Perkins compared Gruber's abilities to those of John Hannah. Perkins said that his change of mind about spending high picks on left tackles came about because the way that many teams were now lining up their best athletes at right end or outside linebacker had caused left tackle to become a skill position. The selection of Gruber had a ripple effect on the rest of the draft, as it affected the Jets’ and Giants’ selections shortly thereafter.

The only well-known player the Buccaneers drafted was Lars Tate, who had scored 30 touchdowns at Georgia. Perkins claimed that Tate was the running back that the team had rated highest before their trades were made, and that they were surprised to find him still available in the lower second round. Robert Goff was expected to provide help with the pass rush, and John Bruhin was selected because he was the highest-rated player available. William Howard was considered to be a good short-yardage and goal-line running back.

Of the second day's choices, Kerry Goode was considered particularly intriguing. One of Perkins’ former players at Alabama, he had been one of the Southeastern Conference's top running backs before suffering a knee injury, and after recovering had been unable to get past Bobby Humphrey into the starting lineup. With defensive line considered to be the team's most pressing need, they drafted North Alabama tackle Shawn Lee in the sixth round, and North Carolina tackle Reuben Davis in the ninth. Lee, a converted linebacker, impressed scouts with unusual speed and agility for a defensive lineman. The team drafted four running backs for the second year in a row. Despite the draft's unusual depth of talent at wide receiver, the Buccaneers’ only selection at that position was 11th-round choice Frank Pillow of Tennessee State University. Several receivers the Buccaneers were interested in were taken by the team picking directly ahead of them, including Brett Perriman and Michael Haynes.

Following the draft, the team announced the signing of James Wilder Sr. to a new contract, and traded a 12th-round 1989 draft choice to the Indianapolis Colts for recently signed quarterback Joe Ferguson. They also traded veteran tackle Ron Heller to the Seattle Seahawks for defensive lineman Randy Edwards and a 1989 draft pick. Heller requested the trade, apparently before an incident the previous season in which Perkins broke two fingers while punching Heller in the head.

== Preseason ==
Before the season, Perkins identified linebacker and offensive line as the team's strengths, and safety, wide receiver, and defensive end as the team's biggest needs. 74 players reported to the University of Tampa for the opening of training camp, only twenty of whom were on the team when Perkins was hired, and only three of whom (Gerald Carter, Joe Ferguson, and James Wilder) were 30 or older. The team's leading tackler three of the last four years, linebacker Jeff Davis held out of training camp in a contract dispute. Perkins attempted to trade him, but Davis was considered by most teams to be past his peak, and there were no willing takers. With newly acquired Eugene Marve performing well, Perkins released Davis outright. Davis was later signed by San Diego, but failed to make the team out of preseason. Lacking a game-breaking receiver, the team pursued Ron Brown of the Rams, but eventually signed Patriots holdout Stephen Starring. One of the defensive line questions was solved by the emergence of ninth-round draft pick Reuben Davis midway through camp. His preseason performance moved him ahead of John Cannon into a starting role. Perkins reported difficulty finding a second safety to play along with Mark Robinson, until the Jets cut Harry Hamilton in a salary dispute.

The team found signing its two top draft picks to be difficult. Paul Gruber's agent Ralph Cindrich made public statements to the effect that their contract offer was offensive, although executive Phil Krueger countered that the team's offer was higher than what Bennie Blades, the player drafted ahead of Gruber, had signed for; and that Cindrich was demanding that Gruber be paid more than first-overall pick Aundray Bruce. Only when owner Hugh Culverhouse got involved in the negotiations did Gruber sign, ending a holdout that lasted for a month. Gruber signed a five-year contract that not only made him the highest-paid offensive lineman in NFL history, but it set a precedent for linemen to be paid on par with defensive stars, and was so much higher than the regular salary ceiling that it was expected to change the NFL's salary structure for offensive linemen.

Perkins’ often-harsh treatment of players was in evidence as tight end Calvin Magee walked out of camp, due to pressure to lose 19 pounds in two weeks. Perkins refused to honor Magee's request for a trade, calling it a "cop-out". Rookie fullback William Howard was singled out for his poor physical condition when he was the first to drop out of the 12-minute run on the first day of training camp, although Perkins later praised his toughness. Perkins did, however, ease back from the three-a-day practices of the previous season's training camp, which had been described as the most difficult in NFL history.

The second week of preseason saw the Buccaneers give up five sacks in a 23–3 loss to the Cleveland Browns. With near-daily changes to the offensive line due to injury, the team could not protect the passer, while their own pass rush was ineffective. Perkins said afterward that they didn't deserve to be called a football team. Perkins repeated that assessment after a game against the Atlanta Falcons, which Tampa Bay lost 19–14 despite outgaining the Falcons 401–304. Perkins would name no more than five of the team's eighty players as having played well. The game was followed by the cut of fifteen players, including Monte Robbins, a punter on whom the team had just spent a fourth-round draft pick. Improvement was shown in the final exhibition game, a matchup with the Buffalo Bills at Vanderbilt Stadium in Nashville, but it still resulted in a winless preseason. By the end of preseason, eight of the previous year's opening-day starters were no longer with the team, and four more had been demoted to backup roles.

=== Schedule ===
Week	Date	Opponent	Result	Record	Game site	Attendance	Recap
1	August 6	Indianapolis Colts	L 7–20	0–1	Tampa Stadium	44,258	Recap
2	August 13	Cleveland Browns	L 3–23	0–2	Tampa Stadium	50,074	Recap
3	August 20	at Atlanta Falcons	L 14–19	0–3	Atlanta–Fulton County Stadium	18,841	Recap
4	August 25	vs. Buffalo Bills	L 7–14	0–4	Vanderbilt Stadium (Nashville, TN)	20,600	Recap

== Regular season ==
The Buccaneers entered the season with the worst five-year winning percentage of any NFL team since World War II, including the expansion Buccaneers and their 26-game losing streak. They began the season with an embarrassing 41–14 loss to the Philadelphia Eagles, in which Vinny Testaverde was ineffective against the Eagles’ starters. This was followed with surprisingly competitive performances against quality teams, leading Perkins to reverse his previous estimation that the Buccaneers didn't deserve to be called a team. Problems in pass defense became evident early, with Perkins reluctant to put his secondary in man-to-man coverage, and no sacks through the first two games. The team frequently had to play from behind, being outscored 71–0 in the first quarter through the first seven games. They did not score any first-quarter points until a matchup with the Vikings in the eighth week of the season, but they outscored their opponents 61–14 in the fourth quarter in those seven games. If the first quarter were not counted, the Buccaneers would have started the season 6–1 instead of 2–5.

Perkins identified the team's main problem spots as turnovers, in which the Buccaneers led the NFL, and an inability to stop the pass on third downs. He praised Testaverde's ability to come back from costly early errors and to perform well late in games as the sign of a potentially great quarterback. However, Perkins’ insistence on a one-dimensional running attack displayed a lack of confidence in Testaverde, and was easy for opponents to defend against. Perkins pointed to a late-season upset of the AFC-leading Buffalo Bills as evidence of the team's improvement through the season. This was confirmed by defensive lineman Kevin Kellin, who returned to the team after an 11-week absence to find their attitude changed. The team ended on a strong note, winning two of three games. Their run defense, which had been ranked 21st in the league the previous year, improved to 4th in the NFL. Bruce Hill's 1,040 receiving yards were the second-highest total in team history, behind only Kevin House's 1,176. Mark Carrier's 970 receiving yards left the team 30 yards short of having only the seventh pair of 1,000-yard receivers in league history.

=== Schedule ===
Regular season
Week	Date	Opponent	Result	Game site	Attendance	Record
1	September 4	Philadelphia Eagles	L 41–14	Tampa Stadium	43,502	0–1
2	September 11	at Green Bay Packers	W 13–10	Lambeau Field	52,584	1–1
3	September 18	Phoenix Cardinals	L 30–24	Tampa Stadium	35,034	1–2
4	September 25	at New Orleans Saints	L 13–9	Louisiana Superdome	66,714	1–3
5	October 2	Green Bay Packers	W 27–24	Tampa Stadium	40,003	2–3
6	October 9	at Minnesota Vikings	L 14–13	Hubert H. Humphrey Metrodome	55,274	2–4
7	October 16	at Indianapolis Colts	L 35–31	Hoosier Dome	53,135	2–5
8	October 23	Minnesota Vikings	L 49–20	Tampa Stadium	48,020	2–6
9	October 30	Miami Dolphins	L 17–14	Tampa Stadium	67,352	2–7
10	November 6	at Chicago Bears	L 28–10	Soldier Field	56,892	2–8
11	November 13	at Detroit Lions	W 23–20	Pontiac Silverdome	25,956	3–8
12	November 20	Chicago Bears	L 27–15	Tampa Stadium	67,070	3–9
13	November 27	at Atlanta Falcons	L 17–10	Atlanta–Fulton County Stadium	14,020	3–10
14	December 4	Buffalo Bills	W 10–5	Tampa Stadium	49,498	4–10
15	December 11	at New England Patriots	L 10–7_{(OT)}	Sullivan Stadium	39,889	4–11
16	December 18	Detroit Lions	W 21–10	Tampa Stadium	37,778	5–11

Notes:

^{a} All times in North American Eastern Time. (UTC–4 and UTC–5 during Standard Time)

=== Standings ===
NFC Central
	W	L	T	PCT	DIV	CONF	PF	PA	STK
Chicago Bears^{(1)}	12	4	0	.750	6–2	9–3	312	215	L1
Minnesota Vikings^{(4)}	11	5	0	.688	6–2	9–3	406	233	W1
Tampa Bay Buccaneers	5	11	0	.313	4–4	4–8	261	350	W1
Detroit Lions	4	12	0	.250	2–6	3–11	220	315	L2
Green Bay Packers	4	12	0	.250	2–6	3–9	240	313	W2

== 1988 roster ==
1988 Tampa Bay Buccaneers roster
Quarterbacks (QB): 12 Joe Ferguson; 14 Vinny Testaverde; Running backs (RB): 27 Kerry Goode; 25 Bobby Howard; 43 William Howard FB; 47 Don Smith KR; 35 Jeff Smith KR/PR; 34 Lars Tate; Wide receivers (WR): 88 Mark Carrier; 83 Bruce Hill; 80 Frank Pillow; 89 Greg Richardson; Tight ends (TE): 83 Ron Hall; 85 Jeff Parks	Offensive linemen (OL): 69 John Bruhin G; 71 Mark Cooper T; 60 Randy Grimes C; 74 Paul Gruber T; 73 Rick Mallory G; 73 Tom McHale G; 72 Rob Taylor T; 64 Kevin Thomas C; 50 Dan Turk G/LS; Defensive linemen (DL): 78 John Cannon DE; 79 Reuben Davis DE; 94 Robert Goff DE; 95 Curt Jarvis NT; 75 Kevin Kellin DE; 97 Shawn Lee NT	Linebackers (LB): 53 Sidney Coleman ILB; 52 Victor Jones ILB; 99 Eugene Marve ILB; 57 Winston Moss OLB; 59 Kevin Murphy OLB; 54 Ervin Randle ILB; 55 Henry Rolling OLB; 56 Jackie Walker OLB; 51 Chris Washington OLB; Defensive backs (DB): 40 Donnie Elder CB/KR/PR; 36 Bobby Futrell CB; 39 Harry Hamilton FS; 20 Odie Harris SS; 22 Rod Jones CB; 29 Ricky Reynolds CB; 30 Mark Robinson SS; Special teams (ST): 4 John Carney K; 13 Ray Criswell P	Reserve: 65 Dan Graham C (IR); 90 Ron Holmes DE (IR); 1 Donald Igwebuike K (IR); 86 Calvin Magee TE (IR); 57 Peter Najarian LB (IR); 98 Ray Seals DE (IR); 62 Mike Simmonds G (IR); 70 Harry Swayne DE (IR); 32 James Wilder RB (IR); Rookies in italics 47 active, 9 reserve

1988 team starters

Offense

14 Vinny Testaverde             QB
34 Lars Tate                    RB
43 William Howard               FB
84 Bruce Hill                   WR
88 Mark Carrier                 WR
82 Ron Hall                     TE

74 Paul Gruber                  LT
68 Rick Mallory                 LG
60 Randy Grimes                 C
50 Dan Turk                     RG
72 Rob Taylor                   RT

Defense

79 Reuben Davis                LDE
95 Curt Jarvis                 NT
90 Ron Holmes                  RDE

59 Kevin Murphy                LB
99 Eugene Marve                LB
53 Sidney Coleman              LB
57 Winston Moss                LB

29 Ricky Reynolds              LCB
36 Bobby Futrell               RCB/PR
30 Mark Robinson               SS
39 Harry Hamilton              FS

Kicking Team

1 Donald Igwebuike             K
13 Ray Criswell                P
40 Donnie Elder                KR

== Coaching staff ==
Tampa Bay Buccaneers 1988 coaching staff
Front office: Owner – Hugh Culverhouse; Head coaches: Vice president, head coach, and offensive coordinator – Ray Perkins; Offensive coaches: Running backs – Sylvester Croom; Wide receivers – Richard Williamson; Offensive line – Larry Beightol; Offensive assistant – John Bobo; Offensive assistant – Mike Shula	Defensive coaches: Defensive coordinator/secondary – Doug Graber; Defensive line – Mike DuBose; Outside linebackers – Kent Johnston; Inside linebackers – Herb Paterra; Defensive assistant – Bill Clay; Special teams coaches: Special teams coordinator – Rodney Stokes; Strength and conditioning – Joe Kines

== Game summaries ==
=== Week 1: vs Philadelphia Eagles ===
	1	2	3	4	Total
Eagles	21	13	7	0	41
Buccaneers	0	0	14	0	14

Sep 4, 1988 at Tampa Stadium, Tampa, Florida

The cheers that greeted Vinny Testaverde as he took the field turned to boos after his first three passes, all incompletions. The Philadelphia Eagles took a 34–0 halftime lead, aided by Testaverde's three interceptions, to which he added two more in the second half. Randall Cunningham scored two touchdowns passing and one rushing before sitting out the second half, along with Anthony Toney, Mike Quick, Reggie White, and Keith Byars. Quick and Keith Jackson caught touchdown passes, while Toney rushed for one and Terry Hoage added to his two interceptions by scoring on a fake punt. It was the Eagles' highest point total since 1981.

=== Week 2: at Green Bay Packers ===
	1	2	3	4	Total
Buccaneers	0	10	0	3	13
Packers	10	0	0	0	10

Sep 11, 1988 at Lambeau Field, Green Bay, Wisconsin

The Buccaneers broke their nine-game losing streak with a 28-yard field goal by Donald Igwebuike on the final play of the game. Vinny Testaverde led a 56-yard drive to set up the kick, which followed Max Zendejas' missed 52-yard attempt. They capitalized on the Packers' mistake-prone play, which included a Brent Fullwood fumble that led to a Lars Tate touchdown run, and a late-game fourth-down conversion at the Buccaneer 35 that was called back by a penalty. Packers nose tackle Jerry Boyarsky suffered a broken arm that required the insertion of a plate and caused him to miss the rest of the season. The injury left the Packers with only three healthy linemen, and required defensive end Blaise Winter to fill in at nose tackle. Phil Epps also went on injured reserve with a broken wrist. Tampa Bay linebacker Ervin Randle left the game with a shoulder injury and was replaced by rookie free agent Sidney Coleman, who made seven tackles, recovered a fumble, and was awarded a game ball. Perkins later praised the team for continuing to fight, despite turning the ball over in Buccaneer territory on a Testaverde fumble late in the fourth quarter. He also reported pleasure with Testaverde's interception-free performance.

=== Week 3: vs Phoenix Cardinals ===
	1	2	3	4	Total
Cardinals	13	7	3	7	30
Buccaneers	0	3	7	14	24

Sep 18, 1988 at Tampa Stadium, Tampa, Florida

The Phoenix Cardinals took a 20–3 halftime lead, then withstood a Buccaneer rally to get their first win of the season. Cliff Stoudt played the second half in relief of Neil Lomax, who had a sore hip. Stoudt threw the game-winning touchdown, a 42-yard pass to Jay Novacek. That followed a play in which Lars Tate dove over the line, regained his feet, and ran 47 yards for a touchdown to give the Buccaneers their only lead of the game. The Buccaneers also scored on a James Wilder Sr. run and a Vinny Testaverde pass to Bruce Hill. Stump Mitchell rushed for 110 yards and a touchdown. The Cardinals 475 yards of offense nearly matched their highest total from the previous season.

=== Week 4: at New Orleans Saints ===
	1	2	3	4	Total
Buccaneers	0	6	0	3	9
Saints	10	3	0	0	13

Sep 25, 1988 at Louisiana Superdome, New Orleans

A Bobby Hebert first-quarter touchdown pass and two Morten Andersen field goals lifted the New Orleans Saints past the Buccaneers. The matchup faced Hebert, the NFC's highest-rated passer, against Testaverde, the NFC's lowest-rated. Testaverde was sacked four times and hurried repeatedly by a constant Saints pass rush, but was only intercepted once. After failing to block several blitzers, Lars Tate was replaced with Kerry Goode, who led the team in rushing with ten carries for 44 yards in his NFL debut. Goode also ran for a touchdown which was erased by a penalty, and dropped a pass in the end zone.

=== Week 5: vs Green Bay Packers ===
	1	2	3	4	Total
Packers	3	7	7	7	24
Buccaneers	0	10	0	17	27

Oct 2, 1988, at Tampa Stadium, Tampa, Florida

The Buccaneers defeated the winless Packers with a fourth-quarter rally led by Vinny Testaverde, who tied the game with a 19-yard touchdown pass to Bruce Hill. Donald Igwebuike kicked the winning field goal with 12 seconds remaining. A strong defense made up for the Buccaneers' early lack of offense. An apparent fumble return touchdown by Kevin Murphy was called back when the officials ruled the ball dead, but he intercepted a Randy Wright pass for a 35-yard touchdown on the next play. The offense improved in the second half, when the Buccaneers placed more emphasis on their running game. Testaverde passed for 300 yards, including a stretch of six consecutive completions that gained 107 yards and the touchdown to Hill, and threw two potential touchdowns that were dropped by Mark Carrier in the end zone. Perkins later praised Testaverde for keeping his poise instead of getting frustrated after throwing four interceptions, and said that it was the most physical game the Buccaneer defense had played with him as coach.

=== Week 6: at Minnesota Vikings ===
	1	2	3	4	Total
Buccaneers	0	10	0	3	13
Vikings	7	0	7	0	14

Oct 9, 1988, at Hubert H. Humphrey Metrodome, Minneapolis

The Buccaneers took a 10–7 halftime lead, after controlling the ball for 12:17 of a second quarter in which they allowed the Vikings only three offensive plays. A third-quarter James Wilder fumble set up the Vikings' second touchdown. Stephen Starring caught a late Hail Mary pass that put the Buccaneers in range for a game-winning field goal, but confusion over the play call allowed time to run out before the kick could be made. Perkins accepted blame for the loss, saying that he had not prepared the team for that specific situation; but players said that he should not take the blame, and that the score should not have been close given the number of mistakes made. Kerry Goode led the team in rushing, with 82 yards on 14 carries. The loss denied Tampa Bay the opportunity to tie the Vikings for second place in the NFC Central.

=== Week 7: at Indianapolis Colts ===
	1	2	3	4	Total
Buccaneers	0	10	0	21	31
Colts	7	14	14	0	35

Oct 16, 1988, at Hoosier Dome, Indianapolis

Vinny Testaverde set a new career high of 469 passing yards in a second-half rally that overwhelmed the Colts' defense, but was not enough to overcome the Buccaneers’ early errors. The Buccaneers gave up three sacks, were penalized 10 times for 86 yards, and allowed the Colts to score touchdowns on five consecutive possessions. Eric Dickerson rushed for two touchdowns, and Eugene Daniel returned an interception for another. Indianapolis rookie quarterback Chris Chandler threw a 28-yard touchdown pass to Bill Brooks and rushed for another, and was able to evade several potential sacks to gain first downs rushing. Still, the Buccaneers' comeback hopes ended only when a potential Bruce Hill pass reception on fourth-and-two with 59 seconds left was defensed by ex-Buccaneer John Holt, with Holt making contact with Hill but not drawing a flag. Hill caught two touchdowns and a career-high 162 yards, which gave him a season yardage total second only to Jerry Rice in the NFC. Right guard Dan Turk suffered a knee injury, and was replaced in the lineup by rookie John Bruhin. Ron Hall had 7 catches for 121 yards. Don Smith and Lars Tate each rushed for a touchdown, although fullback James Wilder missed the game with an injury and the Buccaneers rushed for a season-low 39 yards.

Testaverde's 469 yards were a career-high (including high school, college, and professional play), the second-most in club history, tenth-most in NFL history, and the most thrown in a game since Ken O'Brien's 479 in 1986. It was the second-best performance by a second-year quarterback in NFL history, next to Dan Marino's 470 yards in 1984. His 340-second-half yards are a club single-half record, and his .595 completion percentage was the best in his career to date. The performance raised his passer rating enough to move him out of last place in the NFC, raised his season completion percentage above .500 for the first time, and left him leading all NFL quarterbacks in both yardage (1,839) and interceptions (16) thrown.

=== Week 8: vs Minnesota Vikings ===
	1	2	3	4	Total
Vikings	7	21	7	14	49
Buccaneers	10	0	3	7	20

Oct 23, 1988, at Tampa Stadium, Tampa, Florida

The Buccaneers scored their first first-quarter points of the season en route to an early 10–7 lead, before Vinny Testaverde's six interceptions led to a 49–20 Vikings victory. The six interceptions set a Vikings club record. The Buccaneers committed a total of seven turnovers, all of which led to Vikings touchdowns. Some players were angered over printed comments that several Vikings players considered the Buccaneers to be a mediocre team, and so had taken them lightly on their first meeting. The interceptions gave Testaverde 22 for the season, putting him on pace to break George Blanda's NFL record of 42. The performance came one week after Testaverde's 469-yard game against Indianapolis, which had led him to speak of "turning the corner" in his pro career.

=== Week 9: vs Miami Dolphins ===
	1	2	3	4	Total
Dolphins	0	0	17	0	17
Buccaneers	0	0	0	14	14

Oct 30, 1988, at Tampa Stadium, Tampa, Florida

A combination of the previous week's poor performance and a back injury led to Vinny Testaverde's surprise replacement by Joe Ferguson as the starter. Ferguson completed 26-of-37 passes for 291 yards and two touchdowns, and nearly led a fourth-quarter comeback. For the second week in a row, Buccaneer turnovers led to all of an opponent's scores. This time, running backs Kerry Goode, Lars Tate, and William Howard combined for four fumbles, leaving the team with a −20 giveaway/takeaway ratio for the season. The Dolphins scored on two touchdown passes from Dan Marino to Mark Clayton, and a Tony Franklin field goal.

=== Week 10: at Chicago Bears ===
	1	2	3	4	Total
Buccaneers	0	3	7	0	10
Bears	0	14	14	0	28

Nov 6, 1988 at Soldier Field, Chicago

The Bears played the game with Mike Tomczak replacing the injured Jim McMahon at quarterback, and with Vince Tobin filling in for head coach Mike Ditka, who was in a hospital recovering from a mild heart attack suffered the previous week. Tomczak completed 18 of 26 passes for 269 yards, including 4 completions for 87 yards and a touchdown to Dennis McKinnon. Thomas Sanders and Neal Anderson scored on one-yard runs. The touchdown to McKinnon was the Bears' first third-quarter touchdown of the season. The Buccaneers scored on a 21-yard touchdown pass from Vinny Testaverde to Bruce Hill. Testaverde completed 22 of 52 passes for 305 yards. He was intercepted twice, but Perkins praised Testaverde's performance, saying that he played with "more discipline and more control" than in his six-interception performance on Oct. 23. The Buccaneers had early success running against the Bears' top-ranked run defense, but fell behind as the Bears came to life following Donald Igwebuike's 45-yard second-quarter field goal. The Buccaneers were able to hold the Bears to only 69 yards rushing, although Bears players later attributed their avoidance of the ground game to the ease with which they were able to pass. The game was played on the occasion of Ray Perkins' 47th birthday.

=== Week 11: at Detroit Lions ===
	1	2	3	4	Total
Buccaneers	7	3	0	13	23
Lions	10	0	0	10	20

Nov 13, 1988 at Pontiac Silverdome, Pontiac, Michigan

Lars Tate, Kerry Goode, and William Howard combined for 223 yards rushing, which allowed Vinny Testaverde to overcome his early struggles. Testaverde passed for a season-low 107 yards, but was 5-for-5 in the second half, including a 26-yard pass to Bruce Hill with 16 seconds left that set up Donald Igwebuike's winning field goal. Tate's 106 yards rushing made him the first Buccaneer to rush for over 100 yards since James Wilder's 130-yard performance against the Lions two years prior. Howard rushed for 78 yards on 16 carries, in front of a crowd of 250 supporters who had driven to Detroit from his Lima, Ohio, hometown. Testaverde celebrated his 25th birthday with the win. Ron Holmes suffered a season-ending knee injury. The crowd of 25,956 was the smallest non-strike attendance in Silverdome history, and was the smallest Detroit crowd since a 1951 game against the New York Yanks in Briggs Stadium drew 21,807 fans. The loss resulted in Lions owner William Clay Ford firing head coach Darryl Rogers, and replacing him with former Buccaneer defensive coordinator Wayne Fontes.

=== Week 12: vs Chicago Bears ===
	1	2	3	4	Total
Bears	14	7	0	6	27
Buccaneers	3	3	0	9	15

Nov 20, 1988 at Tampa Stadium, Tampa, Florida

The Buccaneers suffered their twelfth consecutive loss to the Bears, as Neal Anderson rushed for two first-quarter touchdowns, and Mike Tomczak threw a 40-yard touchdown to Brad Muster. The Buccaneers matched up well statistically with the Bears, but were unable to overcome the early deficit due to mistake-prone play and a poor game from Vinny Testaverde. The Bears also had problems with mistakes, committing four turnovers, and giving up a safety (the first safety in Buccaneers history) due to a bad snap on a punt. The Buccaneers were able to rush for 168 yards against the Bears' top-ranked defense, more than double the total usually allowed by the Bears. Donald Igwebuike suffered a season-ending groin injury while tackling Dennis Gentry on a third-quarter kickoff return.

=== Week 13: at Atlanta Falcons ===
	1	2	3	4	Total
Buccaneers	0	0	10	0	10
Falcons	3	7	0	7	17

Nov 27, 1988 at Atlanta–Fulton County Stadium, Atlanta

The Buccaneers entered the game with the NFL's fourth-ranked run defense, but the Falcons were able to match the season-high rushing total of 181 yards that had been previously set by the Cardinals on September 18. John Settle broke several tackles in a 48-yard run, the longest against the Buccaneers all season, which set up Chris Miller's game-winning 37-yard touchdown pass to Michael Haynes. Gerald Riggs rushed for 98 yards, while Settle gained 83. The Buccaneers outgained the Falcons in total yardage, but dropped passes and committed penalties and turnovers at key times. Vinny Testaverde's three interceptions gave him an NFL-leading total of 31 for the season. The game was played in a downpour, in front of an NFL season-low crowd of 14,020.

Calvin Magee suffered a season-ending knee injury, and was replaced by Jeff Parks, who had spent parts of the 1986–1988 seasons with the Oilers and the Packers. The team also cut wide receiver Joey Clinkscales, and replaced him with speedy former Vikings receiver Jeff Richardson.

=== Week 14: vs Buffalo Bills ===
	1	2	3	4	Total
Bills	0	0	2	3	5
Buccaneers	0	10	0	0	10

Dec 4, 1988 at Tampa Stadium, Tampa, Florida

Vinny Testaverde's only turnover-free game of the season helped the Buccaneers to upset the Buffalo Bills, who entered the game with the AFC's best record, and whose only previous defeats had come against division leaders Chicago and Cincinnati. Testaverde scored the game's only touchdown on a 4-yard run, while John Carney contributed a 39-yard field goal. Perkins later praised Testaverde's performance as "one of the greatest games I've ever seen a quarterback play". Jim Kelly was the victim of several dropped passes, and threw an interception in the final minute. Bruce Smith sacked Testaverde for a safety. The Bills committed 12 penalties for 100 yards. It was the first time since 1984 that Tampa Bay won a game against a team with a winning record.

=== Week 15: at New England Patriots ===
	1	2	3	4	OT	Total
Buccaneers	0	0	0	7	0	7
Patriots	0	0	7	0	3	10

Dec 11, 1988 at Sullivan Stadium, Foxboro, Massachusetts

Despite entering the game with a 2–16 record in cold-weather games, the Buccaneers took the Patriots into overtime. The Buccaneers won the overtime coin toss, but based on the team's defensive performance to that point, Perkins decided to kick off in overtime to get the advantage of having the 25-mph wind at their backs. The unusual move backfired, as a pair of Irving Fryar receptions set up Jason Staurovsky's 27-yard field goal that won the game for the Patriots without the Buccaneers ever getting a chance to touch the ball. It was the first overtime win in franchise history for the Patriots, who were facing playoff elimination with a loss. New England's touchdown came on a 6-yard run by Robert Perryman. Vinny Testaverde threw his 32nd interception, which tied Fran Tarkenton's 10-year-old NFC record. Testaverde also threw a touchdown to Mark Carrier for the Buccaneers' only score, although a John Carney field goal was called back due to a tripping penalty on Jackie Walker. Roland James caught Testaverde's interception at the Patriots' 6-yard line, while Harry Hamilton intercepted a Tony Eason pass at the Buccaneers' 1-yard line, and Ricky Reynolds caught another in the end zone. Despite the disappointing loss, players reported feeling upbeat, due to their victory over a playoff team followed by a solid performance against another contender.

=== Week 16: vs Detroit Lions ===
	1	2	3	4	Total
Lions	0	0	10	0	10
Buccaneers	7	7	0	7	21

Dec 18, 1988 at Tampa Stadium, Tampa, Florida

Abandoning their conservative running game of recent weeks, the Buccaneers passed on 10 of their first 16 plays. The early result was that Testaverde was sacked four times, and threw three interceptions for a season total of 35, a record for both the team and the NFC. However, he rebounded to throw a career-high three touchdown passes. Lions quarterback Rusty Hilger was sacked twice by Shaun Lee, and once by John Cannon. Donnie Elder, Harry Hamilton, and Mark Robinson all intercepted Hilger. Bruce Hill caught a touchdown and passed the 1,000-yard receiving mark, while Mark Carrier caught two and fell just short of 1,000 yards.

== Awards and records ==
=== Milestones ===
Vinny Testaverde, most team single-season interceptions thrown (35)
Vinny Testaverde, most team season 300-yard passing games (4, tied Doug Williams' 1980 and 1981 marks, matched by Brad Johnson in 2003)
Vinny Testaverde, most team single-half passing yards (340 vs. Indianapolis on 10/16)
Bruce Hill, most team single-season receiving touchdowns (9, tied Kevin House's 1981 mark, broken by Joey Galloway's 10 in 2005 and Mike Williams' 11 in 2010)
Lars Tate, most team rookie touchdowns (8, broken in 2010 by Mike Williams)
Team defense, fewest season rushing yards allowed (1,551, broken in 1999)
Team defense, lowest season rushing average allowed (3.24)
Team, fewest season punts (68, tied 1984 mark)
Team defense, most points allowed in a home game (49 vs. Minnesota on 10/23)
Team defense, most first-quarter points allowed (21 vs. Philadelphia on 9/4)
