= 1989 Tampa Bay Buccaneers season =

NFL team season

- Owner: Hugh Culverhouse
- Head coach: Ray Perkins
- Home stadium: Tampa Stadium

Results
- Record: 5–11
- Division place: 5th NFC Central
- Playoffs: Did not qualify
- Pro Bowlers: WR Mark Carrier
- Team MVP: WR Mark Carrier

The 1989 Tampa Bay Buccaneers season was the franchise's 14th season in the National Football League the 14th playing their home games at Tampa Stadium and the third under head coach Ray Perkins. The team matched on a 5–11 season in 1988, in which finished winning two of their last three games including an upset of the 1988 AFC East Champion Buffalo Bills, a win that was not only Tampa Bay's high point of the season, but turned out to be hugely impactful on the AFC playoff picture, as Buffalo's loss combined with an overtime win by the Cincinnati Bengals over Washington in the season finale meant that the Bengals clinched the home-field advantage that would have otherwise gone to the Bills; Cincinnati ended up winning a close AFC title game at home against Buffalo and got to Super Bowl XXIII. The season started with a road win against the improved Green Bay Packers, and game two brought the Super Bowl champion San Francisco 49ers and Joe Montana to Tampa Stadium. With Joe trying to direct a 4th quarter comeback, cornerback Ricky Reynolds dropped what would have been a game ending interception on second down in the end zone. On third down, Montana rolled out and ran untouched into the endzone for a winning TD that left a rare sellout crowd stunned and silent in defeat. The Bucs extended their record to 3–2 by beating the hated Chicago Bears finally in Tampa Stadium, holding off the Bears to a 42–35 victory. It was an impressive win, but then the Bucs lost to the Detroit Lions in the last minute and entered into an overall five-game losing-streak tailspin. Tampa Bay would sweep Chicago to end the streak (an achievement which was diluted by the Bears having their worst season in several years) but ended with a disappointing 5–11 record. James Wilder Sr.’s final season was highlighted by a 100-yard receiving game in week 9. Many fans felt the Bucs were far better than the final record suggested, and offseason acquisitions would help the Bucs win the next year.

== Offseason ==
=== NFL draft ===
Pick	Round	Player	Position	School
4	1	Broderick Thomas	Outside Linebacker	Nebraska
33	2	Danny Peebles	Wide Receiver	N.C. State
90	4	Anthony Florence	Defensive Back	Bethune-Cookman
117	5	Jamie Lawson	Running Back	Nicholls State
146	6	Chris Mohr	Punter	Alabama
154	6	Derrick Little	Linebacker	South Carolina
200	8	Carl Bax	Guard	Missouri
230	9	Patrick Egu	Running Back	Nevada
257	10	Ty Granger	Tackle	Clemson
284	11	Rod Mounts	Guard	Texas A&M
290	11	Willie Griffin	Defensive End	Nebraska
302	11	Herb Duncan	Wide Receiver	Northern Arizona
329	12	Ulysess Turner	Defensive Back	Virginia Union

== Roster ==
Tampa Bay Buccaneers roster
Quarterbacks: 11 Kerwin Bell; 12 Joe Ferguson; Running backs: 43 William Howard FB; 41 Alvin Mitchell; 24 Sylvester Stamps KR; 34 Lars Tate; 32 James Wilder; Wide receivers: 88 Mark Carrier; 87 Willie Drewrey PR; 84 Bruce Hill; 83 Danny Peebles; 80 Frank Pillow; Tight ends: 82 Ron Hall; 86 William Harris; 85 Jackie Walker	Offensive linemen: 75 Carl Bax G; 69 John Bruhin G; 71 Mark Cooper G; 65 Dan Graham C; 60 Randy Grimes C; 74 Paul Gruber T; 73 Tom McHale G; 70 Harry Swayne T; 72 Rob Taylor T; Defensive linemen: 78 John Cannon DE; 79 Reuben Davis DE; 94 Robert Goff DE; 97 Shawn Lee NT; 77 Rhondy Weston DE	Linebackers: 99 Eugene Marve ILB; 58 Winston Moss OLB; 59 Kevin Murphy OLB; 57 Peter Najarian ILB; 54 Ervin Randle ILB; 51 Broderick Thomas OLB; Defensive backs: 25 Sherman Cocroft FS; 40 Donnie Elder CB/KR; 36 Bobby Futrell CB/PR; 39 Harry Hamilton FS; 20 Odie Harris SS; 22 Rod Jones CB; 29 Ricky Reynolds CB; 30 Mark Robinson SS; Special teams: 56 Sam Anno LS; 3 John Carney K; 1 Donald Igwebuike K; 5 Chris Mohr P	Reserve lists: 53 Sidney Coleman LB (IR); 95 Curt Jarvis NT (IR); 38 Jamie Lawson FB (IR); 98 Ray Seals DE (IR); 62 Mike Simmonds G (IR); 47 Don Smith RB (IR); 14 Vinny Testaverde QB (IR); Practice squad: 81 Herb Duncan WR; 28 Anthony Florence CB; 52 Maurice Oliver LB; 47 active, 7 inactive, 3 practice squad rookies in italics

== Regular season ==
=== Schedule ===
**Regular season**
Week	Date	Opponent	Result	Game site	Attendance	Record
1	September 10	at **Green Bay Packers**	W 23–21	Lambeau Field	55,650	1–0
2	September 17	San Francisco 49ers	L 20–16	Tampa Stadium	64,087	1–1
3	September 24	New Orleans Saints	W 20–10	Tampa Stadium	44,053	2–1
4	October 1	at **Minnesota Vikings**	L 17–3	Hubert H. Humphrey Metrodome	54,817	2–2
5	October 8	**Chicago Bears**	W 42–35	Tampa Stadium	72,077	3–2
6	October 15	**Detroit Lions**	L 17–16	Tampa Stadium	46,225	3–3
7	October 22	at Washington Redskins	L 32–28	Robert F. Kennedy Memorial Stadium	52,862	3–4
8	October 29	at Cincinnati Bengals	L 56–23	Riverfront Stadium	57,225	3–5
9	November 5	Cleveland Browns	L 42–31	Tampa Stadium	69,162	3–6
10	November 12	**Minnesota Vikings**	L 24–10	Tampa Stadium	56,271	3–7
11	November 19	at **Chicago Bears**	W 32–31	Soldier Field	63,826	4–7
12	November 26	at Phoenix Cardinals	W 14–13	Sun Devil Stadium	33,297	5–7
13	December 3	**Green Bay Packers**	L 17–16	Tampa Stadium	58,120	5–8
14	December 10	at Houston Oilers	L 20–17	Astrodome	54,532	5–9
15	December 17	at **Detroit Lions**	L 33–7	Pontiac Silverdome	40,362	5–10
16	December 24	Pittsburgh Steelers	L 31–22	Tampa Stadium	29,690	5–11

Notes:

Division opponents in bold text

=== Season summary ===
==== Week 1: at Green Bay Packers ====
Week 1: Tampa Bay Buccaneers at Green Bay Packers

Quarter	1	2	3	4	Total
**Buccaneers**	0	20	3	0	**23**
Packers	7	0	7	7	**21**

at Lambeau Field, Green Bay, Wisconsin

- Date: September 10, 1989
- Game time: 1:00 p.m. CST
- Game weather: Overcast, 60 °F (16 °C)
- TV announcers (CBS): Jim Nantz and Pat Haden

Game information

**First quarter**

**Second quarter**

**Third quarter**

**Fourth quarter**

Top passers

- TAM – Vinny Testaverde – 22/27, 205 yards, 1 TD
- GB – Don Majkowski – 21/32, 313 yards, 1 TD, 1 INT

Top rushers

- TAM – William Howard – 17 rushes, 67 yards
- GB – Brent Fullwood – 8 rushes, 54 yards

Top receivers

- TAM – Mark Carrier – 6 receptions, 73 yards
- GB – Keith Woodside – 6 receptions, 49 yards

==== Week 9: vs. Cleveland Browns ====
Week 9: Tampa Bay Buccaneers vs. Cleveland Browns

Quarter	1	2	3	4	Total
**Browns**	7	28	0	7	**42**
Buccaneers	7	10	7	7	**31**

at Tampa Stadium, Tampa, Florida

- Date: November 5, 1989
- Game time: 1:00 p.m. CST
- Game weather: Overcast, 85 °F (29 °C)
- TV announcers (NBC): Tom Hammond and Joe Namath

Game information

**First quarter**

**Second quarter**

**Third quarter**

**Fourth quarter**

Top passers

- TAM – Vinny Testaverde – 27/50, 370 yards, 2 TD, 4 INT
- CLE – Bernie Kosar – 18/22, 164 yards, 3 TD

Top rushers

- TAM – James Wilder – 6 rushes, 23 yards
- CLE – Eric Metcalf – 17 rushes, 87 yards, 1 TD

Top receivers

- TAM – James Wilder – 8 receptions, 107 yards, 2 TD
- CLE – Eric Metcalf – 7 receptions, 52 yards, 1 TD

This would be the Buccaneers' last home loss to the Browns until 2026.

=== Standings ===
NFC Central
	W	L	T	PCT	DIV	CONF	PF	PA	STK
^{(3)} Minnesota Vikings	10	6	0	.625	6–2	8–4	351	275	W1
Green Bay Packers	10	6	0	.625	5–3	10–4	362	356	W2
Detroit Lions	7	9	0	.438	4–4	6–6	312	364	W5
Chicago Bears	6	10	0	.375	2–6	4–8	358	377	L6
Tampa Bay Buccaneers	5	11	0	.313	3–5	5–7	320	419	L4
