= 1990 Tampa Bay Buccaneers season =

NFL team season

- Owner: Hugh Culverhouse
- Head coach: Ray Perkins (fired December 2; 5–8 record); Richard Williamson (interim; 1–2 record)
- Home stadium: Tampa Stadium

Results
- Record: 6–10
- Division place: 2nd NFC Central
- Playoffs: Did not qualify
- Pro Bowlers: CB Wayne Haddix
- Team MVP: CB Wayne Haddix

The 1990 Tampa Bay Buccaneers season was the franchise's 15th season in the National Football League.

Head coach Ray Perkins and Bucs players were getting criticized by fans with his 3-a-day training camp practices. Leaving many players complaining of fatigue late in the year, and with injuries that never really healed themselves throughout the end of the season.

Still, after starting 4–2 via four wins against divisional opponents, the Buccaneers dropped two out of three games to a weak Dallas Cowboys team. Later in the year, quarterback Vinny Testaverde and receiver Willie Drewrey combined on an 89-yard touchdown pass in week 13 for the longest play in franchise history. Coach Perkins was fired after that game and the team fell short of a possible break even season with two losses to end the season, although the 6–10 record was Tampa Bay's best since 1984, John McKay's last season as coach.

Offensive coordinator Richard Williamson was made head coach for the 1991 season based on a 1–2 record. Tax records showed the Buccaneers were one of the most profitable teams during this time, even though owner Hugh Culverhouse announced the Bucs were losing money and needed to play games in Orlando, Florida to gain income.

The Buccaneers officially finished second in the NFC Central thanks to their 5–3 divisional record. The other three teams in the division who went 6–10 — the Lions, Packers and Vikings — all went 3–5 in division games (Tampa Bay went 5-1 against that trio, sweeping Detroit and Minnesota). The second-place finish was their highest since winning the division in 1981, and would be their highest until 1997.

== Offseason ==
=== NFL draft ===
Pick	Round	Player	Position	School
4	Round 1	Keith McCants	Linebacker	Alabama
30	Round 2	Reggie Cobb	Running Back	Tennessee
87	Round 4	Jess Anderson	Tight End	Mississippi State
108	Round 4	Tony Mayberry	Center	Wake Forest
114	Round 5	Ian Beckles	Guard	Indiana
141	Round 6	Derrick Douglas	Running Back	Louisiana Tech
171	Round 7	Donnie Gardner	Defensive End	Kentucky
224	Round 9	Terry Cook	Defensive End	Fresno State
254	Round 10	Mike Busch	Tight End	Iowa State
281	Round 11	Terry Anthony	Wide Receiver	Florida State
307	Round 12	Todd Hammel	Quarterback	Stephen F. Austin

== Roster ==
Tampa Bay Buccaneers 1990 roster
Quarterbacks: 7 Jeff Carlson; 17 Chris Chandler; 14 Vinny Testaverde; Running backs: 40 Gary Anderson; 33 Reggie Cobb; 37 Derrick Douglas; 26 John Harvey; 32 Bruce Perkins FB; Wide receivers: 88 Mark Carrier; 87 Willie Drewrey; 81 Chris Ford; 84 Bruce Hill; 80 Frank Pillow; Tight ends: 89 Jesse Anderson; 82 Ron Hall	Offensive linemen: 75 Carl Bax G; 62 Ian Beckles G; 69 John Bruhin G; 60 Randy Grimes C; 74 Paul Gruber T; 73 Tom McHale G; 61 Tony Mayberry C; 70 Harry Swayne T; 72 Rob Taylor T; Defensive linemen: 78 John Cannon DE; 79 Reuben Davis DE; 93 Benji Roland DE; 71 Jim Skow DE; 91 Robb White NT; 66 Willie Wyatt NT	Linebackers: 53 Sidney Coleman ILB; 99 Eugene Marve ILB; 51 Keith McCants OLB; 58 Winston Moss ILB/OLB; 59 Kevin Murphy OLB; 54 Ervin Randle ILB; 51 Broderick Thomas OLB; Defensive backs: 42 Eric Everett CB; 45 Wayne Haddix CB; 39 Harry Hamilton FS; 20 Odie Harris CB; 29 Ricky Reynolds CB; 31 Rodney Rice CB; 30 Mark Robinson SS; Special teams: 56 Sam Anno LS; 2 Steve Christie K; 3 Mark Royals P	Reserve lists: 76 Scott Dill G (IR); 95 Curt Jarvis NT (IR) Retired; 96 Tim Newton NT (IR); 83 Danny Peebles WR/KR (IR); Practice squad: 85 Terry Anthony WR; -- Daryl Reed S; 86 Ed Thomas TE; 47 active, 4 inactive, 3 practice squad rookies in italics

== Regular season ==
=== Schedule ===
Week	Date	Opponent	Result	Game site	Record	Attendance
1	September 9	at **Detroit Lions**	**W** 38–21	Pontiac Silverdome	1–0	56,692
2	September 16	Los Angeles Rams	**L** 35–14	Tampa Stadium	1–1	59,705
3	September 23	**Detroit Lions**	**W** 23–20	Tampa Stadium	2–1	55,075
4	September 30	at **Minnesota Vikings**	**W** 23–20_{(OT)}	Hubert H. Humphrey Metrodome	3–1	54,462
5	October 7	at Dallas Cowboys	**L** 14–10	Texas Stadium	3–2	60,076
6	October 14	**Green Bay Packers**	**W** 26–14	Tampa Stadium	4–2	67,472
7	October 21	Dallas Cowboys	**L** 17–13	Tampa Stadium	4–3	68,315
8	October 28	at San Diego Chargers	**L** 41–10	Jack Murphy Stadium	4–4	40,653
9	November 4	**Chicago Bears**	**L** 26–6	Tampa Stadium	4–5	68,555
10	November 11	at New Orleans Saints	**L** 35–7	Louisiana Superdome	4–6	67,865
11	November 18	at San Francisco 49ers	**L** 31–7	Candlestick Park	4–7	62,221
12	November 25	at **Green Bay Packers**	**L** 20–10	Milwaukee County Stadium	4–8	53,677
13	December 2	Atlanta Falcons	**W** 23–17	Tampa Stadium	5–8	42,839
14	Bye					
15	December 16	**Minnesota Vikings**	**W** 26–13	Tampa Stadium	6–8	47,272
16	December 23	at **Chicago Bears**	**L** 27–14	Soldier Field	6–9	46,456
17	December 30	New York Jets	**L** 16–14	Tampa Stadium	6–10	46,543
Notes: Division opponents in **bold** text

=== Standings ===
NFC Central
	W	L	T	PCT	DIV	CONF	PF	PA	STK
^{(3)} Chicago Bears	11	5	0	.688	6–2	9–3	348	280	L1
Tampa Bay Buccaneers	6	10	0	.375	5–3	6–8	264	367	L2
Detroit Lions	6	10	0	.375	3–5	5–7	373	413	L1
Green Bay Packers	6	10	0	.375	3–5	5–7	271	347	L5
Minnesota Vikings	6	10	0	.375	3–5	4–8	351	326	L4
