= Bruce Hill =

Bruce Hill may refer to:

- Bruce Hill (American football) (born 1964), former wide receiver in NFL football
- Bruce Hill (racing driver) (1949–2017), former American stock car driver
