= Super Bowl XXIX =

1995 edition of the Super Bowl

San Diego Chargers (2) (AFC) (11–5)	San Francisco 49ers (1) (NFC) (13–3)
26	49
Head coach: Bobby Ross	Head coach: George Seifert
	1	2	3	4	Total
SD	7	3	8	8	26
SF	14	14	14	7	49
- Date: January 29, 1995
- Kickoff time: 6:20p.m. EST (UTC-5)
- Stadium: Joe Robbie Stadium; Miami, Florida
- MVP: Steve Young, quarterback
- Favorite: 49ers by 18.5
- Referee: Jerry Markbreit
- Attendance: 74,107

Ceremonies
- National anthem: Kathie Lee Gifford
- Coin toss: Otto Graham, Joe Greene, Steve Largent, Ray Nitschke, Gale Sayers, Lee Roy Selmon, and Kellen Winslow
- Halftime show: Patti LaBelle, Tony Bennett, Arturo Sandoval, and Miami Sound Machine

TV in the United States
- Network: ABC
- Announcers: Al Michaels, Frank Gifford, Dan Dierdorf, Lynn Swann, and Lesley Visser
- Nielsen ratings: 41.3 (est. 83.4 million viewers)
- Market share: 63
- Cost of 30-second commercial: $1.15 million

Radio in the United States
- Network: CBS Radio
- Announcers: Jack Buck and Hank Stram

Super Bowl XXIX was an American football championship game featuring an all-California matchup between the American Football Conference (AFC) champion San Diego Chargers and the National Football Conference (NFC) champion San Francisco 49ers to decide the National Football League (NFL) champion for the 1994 season. The 49ers defeated the Chargers by a score of 49–26, becoming the first team to win five Super Bowl championships. The game was played on January 29, 1995, at Joe Robbie Stadium in Miami, Florida. As of 2026, this is the last Super Bowl to feature two teams from the same state.

With 49ers quarterback Steve Young at the helm and a defense consisting of several veteran free agents who joined the team during the previous offseason, San Francisco finished the regular season with a league-best 13–3 record, and led the league in total points scored (505). The Chargers, on the other hand, were regarded as a "Cinderella" team, and advanced to their first Super Bowl after posting an 11–5 regular-season record and overcoming halftime deficits in both of their playoff wins.

This was the first Super Bowl in which both teams scored in all four quarters. The combined aggregate score of 75 points and the ten total touchdowns both remain Super Bowl records. Still, the 49ers controlled most of the game, with Young completing touchdown passes in each of the 49ers' first two drives. The Chargers were able to cut the deficit late in the first quarter, 14–7, on a 13-play, 78-yard drive, but could not slow down San Francisco afterwards. Young was named the Super Bowl MVP, throwing a Super Bowl-record six touchdown passes, and completing 24 out of 36 passes for 325 yards.

Despite the predicted blowout (18.5 points is the second-largest margin a team has been favored by in a Super Bowl), the fact that San Diego did not have as much national appeal nor a relatively large core fan base, and two teams from California playing, which could have significantly diminished interest along the East Coast, the telecast of the game on ABC still had a Nielsen rating of 41.3.

== Background ==
=== Host selection process ===
NFL owners voted to award Super Bowl XXIX to Miami during their May 23, 1991 meeting in Minneapolis. Three cities presented bids: Miami (Joe Robbie Stadium), Tampa (Tampa Stadium), and Houston (Astrodome). New Orleans pulled out of the running early on due to conflicts with other conventions. Houston was considered an early favorite, since they had not hosted the game since 1974. However, the Astrodome would need to add approximately 10,000 temporary seats in order to meet the NFL's capacity requirement of 70,000.

Rules required a candidate to receive a 3/4 vote (21 of 28 owners) in order to win the bidding. Tampa was eliminated on the first ballot, having just hosted XXV, along with their lack of premium seating. Then neither Miami nor Houston managed to get 21 votes on the second ballot or on the third ballot. For the fourth ballot, the threshold was reduced to a simple majority. In what was said to be a close vote, Miami was selected as the host. It marked the seventh time overall the Miami-area hosted the Super Bowl, and the second time it was played in Joe Robbie Stadium.

=== San Diego Chargers ===
San Diego suffered losing seasons in the 1980s until former Washington Redskins general manager Bobby Beathard joined the team in 1990. Beathard decided to rebuild the Chargers using the same model that he used to build the Redskins into Super Bowl contenders during the 1980s: a powerful running game built around big linemen, a passing game that helped sustain extremely long drives, and a bending but steady defense. After former Georgia Tech head coach Bobby Ross was hired by the Chargers in 1992, the team won the AFC West with an 11–5 regular season record and won an opening round playoff game against Kansas City. But in 1993, they slumped back to 8–8 and did not reach the postseason.

Before the start of the 1994 season, San Diego was not expected to do well because they had so many newcomers via the draft and free agency; the Chargers ended up with 22 new players on their roster, and 10 of them became starters. However, they ended up winning their first six regular season games en route to an 11–5 record, the AFC West championship, and the #2 AFC playoff seed. The Chargers went into the final game of the season against the Pittsburgh Steelers needing a win to get the #2 seed (a loss would have given that spot to the Miami Dolphins), which came with a first-round bye and a home game in the divisional round of the playoffs. Backup quarterback Gale Gilbert, subbing for injured starter Stan Humphries, led the Chargers to a come-from-behind 37–34 win, with John Carney kicking a game-winning field goal in the game's final seconds.

The Chargers' offense was led by quarterback Stan Humphries, who was the Redskins' backup to Mark Rypien during the 1991 season, when they won Super Bowl XXVI. During the 1994 season for San Diego, Humphries completed 264 out of 453 attempts for 3,209 yards and 17 touchdowns, with 12 interceptions. Wide receiver Mark Seay was the team's leading receiver with 58 receptions for 645 yards and 6 touchdowns. Wide receiver Tony Martin had 50 catches for 885 yards and 7 touchdowns, wide receiver Shawn Jefferson recorded 43 catches for 627 yards and 3 touchdowns, and tight end Alfred Pupunu had 21 receptions for 214 yards and 2 touchdowns.

Running back Natrone Means led the team in rushing with 1,350 yards and 12 touchdowns. He also recorded 39 receptions for 235 yards, and was named to the Pro Bowl. Third-down back Ronnie Harmon was also a big contributor, catching 58 passes for 615 yards and a touchdown. Meanwhile, the Chargers' special teams was also a major threat with Andre Coleman, who returned 49 kickoffs for 1,293 yards (26.4 average yards per return) and 2 touchdowns.

The Chargers had an excellent defensive line, anchored by Pro Bowl defensive end Leslie O'Neal, who led the team with 12.5 sacks and forced four fumbles, defensive tackle Chris Mims, who recorded 11 sacks, and Shawn Lee, who added 6.5 sacks and a fumble recovery. Their linebacking corps was led by Junior Seau, who was a Pro Bowl selection for the fourth consecutive year, recording 123 tackles, 5.5 sacks, and 3 fumble recoveries. Defensive back Stanley Richard was a major weapon in the secondary, recording 4 interceptions, 224 return yards, and 2 touchdowns. Defensive back Darrien Gordon was also a major asset to the team, recording 4 interceptions and 32 return yards, while also adding another 475 yards and 2 touchdowns returning punts. Safety Rodney Harrison was a rookie on the team.

Chargers backup quarterback Gale Gilbert became the first player to be a member of five consecutive Super Bowl teams. He had been a third-string quarterback for the Buffalo Bills, who had won AFC Championships in the four previous seasons (1990–1993).

=== San Francisco 49ers ===
From the 1988 to the 1993 seasons, the 49ers played in five out of six NFC Championship Games, winning Super Bowls XXIII and XXIV. But after head coach George Seifert's team lost two consecutive NFC Championship games to the Dallas Cowboys in 1992 and 1993, San Francisco brought in several veteran free agents to strengthen their defense. Among the players signed were defensive linemen Richard Dent (the MVP of Super Bowl XX), Charles Mann, Rhett Hall, and Rickey Jackson; linebackers Ken Norton Jr. and Gary Plummer; and cornerback Deion Sanders.

The free agents enabled the 49ers to jump from the 18th-ranked defense in the league to the 8th, and to jump from the league's 16th-best defense against the run to the 2nd. Pro Bowl defensive lineman Dana Stubblefield led the team with 8.5 sacks. Rookie defensive tackle Bryant Young was also a big threat to opposing quarterbacks and rushers, recording 42 tackles, 6 sacks, and a fumble recovery. Behind them, Norton played very effectively at the middle linebacker position, leading the team with 77 tackles and recording an interception. Pro Bowl safety Merton Hanks led the team with 7 interceptions for 93 return yards, while Sanders had 6 interceptions for 303 return yards and 3 touchdowns, earning him the NFL Defensive Player of the Year Award. His 303 return yards was the third-highest total in NFL history, while his touchdown returns of 74, 93, and 90 yards made him the first player ever to have two 90-yard interception returns in one season. Pro Bowl safety Tim McDonald was also a big contributor, recording 2 interceptions for 79 yards and a touchdown.

The 49ers' offense was led by quarterback Steve Young, who replaced future Hall of Famer Joe Montana as the starter in 1991 and 1992 due to injuries. After Young led the league in passing in both seasons, Montana was traded to the Kansas City Chiefs, leaving Young as the undisputed starter in 1993. But even with his impressive passing statistics, Young was criticized as "not being able to win the big games" as Montana had done in leading the 49ers to Super Bowl victories in XVI, XIX, XXIII, and XXIV. It also didn't help that the team had lost to Montana's Chiefs 24–17 during the regular season.

Still, Young again led the league in passing during the 1994 regular season with a passer rating of 112.8, breaking Montana's record for the highest regular season rating in NFL history. Young recorded 324 out of 461 completions for 3,969 yards, 35 touchdowns, and just 10 interceptions. He also had 58 rushes for 293 yards and 7 touchdowns, and earned the NFL Most Valuable Player Award.

With Young at the helm, the 49ers led the league in total points scored (505) and helped them earn a league best 13–3 regular season record. Pro Bowl running back Ricky Watters was the team's leading rusher with 877 yards and 6 touchdowns, while also recording 66 receptions for 719 yards and 5 touchdowns. Rookie fullback William Floyd was the team's second-leading rusher with 305 yards and 6 touchdowns, while also having 19 receptions for 145 yards. The team's leading receiver was Pro Bowl wide receiver Jerry Rice, who had 112 catches for 1,499 yards and 13 touchdowns, while also gaining 93 yards and two more touchdowns rushing the ball. Receiver John Taylor was also a reliable target, catching 41 passes for 531 yards and 5 touchdowns. Pro Bowl tight end Brent Jones added 49 receptions for 670 yards and 9 touchdowns. The offensive line was led by Pro Bowl center Bart Oates, another offseason free agent pickup, and Pro Bowl guard Jesse Sapolu.

Running back Dexter Carter had a standout season as a returner on special teams, gaining a combined total of 1,426 yards and a touchdown returning both punts and kickoffs.

=== Playoffs ===
==== Chargers ====
In the AFC Divisional Playoffs, the Chargers managed to overcome a 21–6 halftime deficit to defeat the Miami Dolphins, 22–21. In the first half, San Diego was limited to only two John Carney field goals, while Miami quarterback Dan Marino threw for over 180 yards and 3 touchdowns. However, the Chargers dominated the Dolphins in the second half, limiting their offense to just 16 plays. In the third quarter, after the Chargers were stopped on fourth and goal at the 1-yard line, Chargers defensive lineman Reuben Davis tackled Dolphins running back Bernie Parmalee in the end zone for a safety. San Diego then took the ensuing free kick and marched 54 yards to score on Means's 24-yard touchdown run. Then with time running out, Humphries threw an 8-yard touchdown pass to wide receiver Mark Seay, giving his team a one-point lead. The Dolphins, aided by a pass interference call, responded with a drive to the Chargers' 31-yard line, but kicker Pete Stoyanovich's potential game-winning 48-yard field goal attempt sailed far to the right of the goal posts and sealed San Diego's stirring win.

San Diego then faced the Pittsburgh Steelers in the AFC Championship Game. Once again, the Chargers fell behind early as the Steelers built up a 13–3 halftime lead, but Humphries fooled the Steelers secondary with a 43-yard play-action touchdown pass to a wide open tight end Alfred Pupunu. The Chargers then took a 17–13 lead when Martin beat the Steelers secondary (particularly a badly overmatched Tim McKyer) down the right sideline for a 43-yard touchdown reception. On their final drive, the Steelers advanced to the San Diego 3-yard line, but Chargers linebacker Dennis Gibson sealed the victory on fourth down by deflecting quarterback Neil O'Donnell's pass intended for running back Barry Foster to turn the ball back over to San Diego. Just like the 49ers in the NFC title game, the Chargers advanced to the Super Bowl despite the fact that their opponent had outgained them in many key statistical categories such as total plays (80–47), total offensive yards (415–226), and time of possession (37:13–22:47).

==== 49ers ====
The 49ers first defeated the Chicago Bears, 44–15, in the NFC Divisional Playoffs. Although Chicago scored first with a field goal, San Francisco scored 37 unanswered points to put the game out of reach by the end of the third quarter. Floyd scored three rushing touchdowns, while Young rushed for a touchdown and threw for another.

San Francisco then defeated their nemesis, the Dallas Cowboys, 38–28, in the NFC Championship Game. Expected to be a close game, the 49ers converted 3 Dallas turnovers into 21 points in the first quarter. On the third play of the game, cornerback Eric Davis returned an interception from Cowboys quarterback Troy Aikman for a touchdown. Wide receiver Michael Irvin lost a fumble on Dallas' next drive, setting up Young's 29-yard touchdown pass to Watters. Then Cowboys returner Kevin Williams lost a fumble on the ensuing kickoff, and it was recovered by kicker Doug Brien at Dallas' 35-yard line. Several plays later, Floyd scored on a 1-yard touchdown run to give San Francisco a 21–0 lead less than 8 minutes into the game. With the score 24–14 in the closing minutes of the first half, Aikman threw 3 straight incompletions, and a short punt by the Cowboys set up Young's 28-yard touchdown completion to Rice with 8 seconds remaining in the first half. The Cowboys eventually cut their deficit to 38–28 with a touchdown run by Emmitt Smith and Aikman's 10-yard touchdown pass to Irvin in the final period, but they were unable to score again. Although the Cowboys outgained the 49ers in total offensive yards (451–294), Aikman broke an NFC Championship Game record with 380 yards passing, and Irvin also broke an NFC Championship Game record with 192 receiving yards, Dallas was ultimately unable to overcome their first-quarter turnovers.

=== Super Bowl pregame news ===
Entering Super Bowl XXIX, most sports writers and fans thought the Chargers had absolutely no chance of defeating the 49ers. San Francisco was on track, winning 12 of its last 13 games (with their only loss in that span coming against the Minnesota Vikings in a meaningless regular season finale at Minnesota), including their playoff victories. Many people also thought that the NFC Championship Game between the 49ers and the Cowboys was "the real Super Bowl", because those two teams were commonly viewed as vastly superior to any AFC team. Furthermore, San Francisco had defeated San Diego, 38–15, during the regular season. As a result, the 49ers entered the game favored to win by 18.5-point, surpassed only by the 19.5-point, by the Baltimore Colts who were favored over the New York Jets in Super Bowl III more than two decades prior.

Many also speculated that Super Bowl XXIX would be the least watched game in Super Bowl history because the Chargers did not have as large of a core fan base as other AFC teams like the Chiefs, the Dolphins, or the Steelers. (This prediction ultimately turned out to be false. Although Super Bowl XXIX was viewed by 125.2 million people and had a Nielsen rating of 41.3, Super Bowl XXVI three years earlier was seen by 119.7 million viewers and recorded a 40.3 rating.)

This was the seventh Super Bowl to be played in Miami, at the time tying both New Orleans, Louisiana and the Greater Los Angeles area for hosting the Super Bowl the most times. It remains the only Super Bowl played between teams that play their home games in the same state (although Super Bowl XXV was played between the New York Giants and the Buffalo Bills, two teams representing areas of New York, the Giants play their home games in New Jersey).

== Broadcasting ==
The game was broadcast in the United States by ABC, with play-by-play announcer Al Michaels and color commentators Frank Gifford and Dan Dierdorf. Lynn Swann reported from the Chargers sideline and Lesley Visser reported from the 49ers sideline. Visser became the first woman assigned to a Super Bowl sideline; she had previously become the first woman sportscaster to cover the Vince Lombardi Trophy presentation ceremony, when she covered Super Bowl XXVI for CBS. Brent Musburger hosted all the Super Bowl XXIX pregame (2 hours), halftime, and postgame events with the help of then-ABC Sports analyst Dick Vermeil, Musburger's regular color commentator on ABC's college football telecasts, and then-New York Jets quarterback Boomer Esiason.

This was the last Super Bowl broadcast by the broadcast team of Michaels, Gifford and Dierdorf. The three called Monday Night Football from the 1987 to 1997, and also worked ABC's coverage of Super Bowls XXII and XXV. This would also be the last Super Bowl aired on ABC until the 1999 season (when Al Michaels called the game with Boomer Esiason). This would also be the final Super Bowl hosted by Musburger, as all subsequent Super Bowls on ABC were hosted by ESPN's Chris Berman following the Disney purchase of ABC (which included ESPN), and the subsequent integration of ESPN and ABC Sports (now ESPN on ABC). Also, the trophy presentation for this game was the last to be held in the winning team's locker room, as all subsequent Vince Lombardi Trophy presentations would be held on the field.

For the Super Bowl lead-out program, ABC premiered the television drama Extreme starring James Brolin; this was the last series to premiere following the Super Bowl until Family Guy premiered following Super Bowl XXXIII and is one of only four in the last 14 years to premiere following a Super Bowl (joining Family Guy, its spinoff American Dad!, and Undercover Boss which premiered following Super Bowl XLIV), since the networks have preferred to have new episodes of established shows to catch as much of the post-game audience as possible.

Thirty-second television advertisements for Super Bowl XXIX averaged $1.15 million in costs, the first time that Super Bowl ads exceeded the $1 million mark.

Super Bowl XXIX aired in over 150 countries worldwide. It was simulcast in Canada on CTV and TVA (in French), in Mexico on Televisa's Canal 5, whose commentators were able to call the game live from San Diego on the last minute, in Germany on Tele 5, in Australia on ABC, in the Philippines on the GMA Network and later aired in the United Kingdom on Channel 4.

This Super Bowl would later be featured on NFL's Greatest Games under the title Exercise in Excellence. The Super Bowl highlight film on which the episode was based was the only Super Bowl highlight film to be narrated by Harry Kalas.

=== In popular culture ===
In the Tuesday prior to the Super Bowl, the ABC sitcom Full House aired an episode called "Super Bowl Fun Day" involving main characters Danny Tanner and Rebecca Donaldson reporting at the game for their show Wake Up, San Francisco. (Full House was set in San Francisco, and this was the only time during the show's run that the 49ers advanced to a Super Bowl aired on ABC.) A week earlier, the Seinfeld episode "The Label Maker" involved Jerry trying to give away his tickets to the game. He eventually decided to go, but unfortunately was stuck sitting next to Newman. Two days after the Super Bowl, the game was the main plot feature of an episode of the ABC sitcom Home Improvement, "Super Bowl Fever", in which Jill was sick with the flu while Tim and his buddies tried to watch the game.

== Entertainment ==
=== Pregame ceremonies ===
The pregame show held before the game featured country music singer Hank Williams Jr., who performed his theme song for Monday Night Football, which was based on his single "All My Rowdy Friends Are Coming Over Tonight".

Actress and singer Kathie Lee Gifford (Frank Gifford's wife) later sang the national anthem. She was accompanied by then-Miss America Heather Whitestone who signed the anthem for the hearing impaired.

To honor the NFL's 75th season, four former players all Hall of Fame members, who were named to the league's 75th Anniversary All-Time Team joined the coin toss ceremony: Otto Graham, Joe Greene, Ray Nitschke, and Gale Sayers.

A special 75th anniversary logo was painted at midfield. Each player also wore a patch on his jersey with the same logo; the 75th anniversary patch was worn by all players league-wide during the 1994 season. During the regular season, teams also wore "throwback" jerseys for selected games. The 49ers wore their throwbacks (which paid tribute to the 1957 Niners) for most of the season, this game included.

=== Halftime show ===
The halftime show was titled "Indiana Jones and the Temple of the Forbidden Eye" and was produced by Disney to promote their Indiana Jones Adventure attraction at Disneyland that opened later that year. The show featured actors playing Indiana Jones and his girlfriend Marion Ravenwood who were raiding the Vince Lombardi Trophy from the Temple of the Forbidden Eye. The show also had performances by singers Tony Bennett and Patti LaBelle, jazz trumpeter Arturo Sandoval, and the Miami Sound Machine. The show ended with everybody singing "Can You Feel The Love Tonight", the song featured in Disney's (which later acquired ABC) 1994 film The Lion King. The dancers on the field were members of the Coral Gables Senior High School marching band.

This halftime show also had a connection with past ABC programming: the first two Indiana Jones films had their broadcast premieres on ABC, and the network aired a TV series, The Young Indiana Jones Chronicles, from 1992 to 1993 (actually serving as the lead-in to Monday Night Football at one point).

== Radio ==
The game was broadcast on nationwide radio by CBS with play-by-play announcer Jack Buck and color commentator Hank Stram. Jim Hunter hosted all of the events. Locally, Super Bowl XXIX was broadcast by XTRA-AM in San Diego with Lee "Hacksaw" Hamilton and Jim Laslavic and by KGO-AM in San Francisco with Joe Starkey and Wayne Walker.

== Game summary ==
=== First quarter ===
After 49ers running back Dexter Carter returned the opening kickoff 9 yards to the San Francisco 26-yard line, a face mask penalty on Chargers linebacker Doug Miller allowed San Francisco to start at their own 41. On the third play of the drive, quarterback Steve Young threw a 44-yard touchdown pass to wide receiver Jerry Rice to take an early 7–0 lead. The 49ers became the second team to take the opening kickoff and score a touchdown on that first drive (the first being the Miami Dolphins in Super Bowl VIII), and also set a new Super Bowl record for the fastest touchdown (later broken by the Chicago Bears' Devin Hester in Super Bowl XLI). After forcing the Chargers to punt after a three-and-out on their opening possession, the 49ers advanced 79 yards in four plays, with Young rushing for 21 yards and then throwing a 51-yard touchdown pass to running back Ricky Watters to give San Francisco a 14–0 lead less than 5 minutes into the first quarter and set a Super Bowl record for the fastest second touchdown scored by a team.

San Diego responded on their ensuing possession, marching 78 yards in 13 plays and taking more than 7 minutes off the clock. The drive featured two receptions and a run by running back Ronnie Harmon for 33 yards and six runs by running back Natrone Means for 22 yards, the last one being a 1-yard touchdown run, cutting the Chargers' deficit to 14–7. However, the 49ers quickly countered after the ensuing kickoff, driving 70 yards in 10 plays. Rice started off the drive with a 19-yard reception and 10-yard run on a reverse play, while Young added a 12-yard completion to wide receiver John Taylor and a 15-yard scramble.

=== Second quarter ===
Four plays into the second quarter, Young threw a 5-yard touchdown pass to fullback William Floyd, increasing the San Francisco lead to 21–7 and making the 49ers the second team to score on its first three possessions (after Green Bay) of a Super Bowl and the first (and only as of 2024) to score touchdowns on its first three possessions.

After the next three possessions ended in punts, Chargers punter Bryan Wagner's 40-yard punt from his own 9-yard line gave the 49ers the ball at the San Diego 49. San Francisco then marched on a 9-play drive, which included two receptions by Rice for 19 yards and ended with Young's fourth touchdown pass, an 8-yard toss to Watters, with 4:44 left in the half, making the score 28–7. San Diego then took the ensuing kickoff and drove 62 yards from their own 25-yard line to the San Francisco 13, featuring a 17-yard reception by wide receiver Mark Seay, a 10-yard reverse run by wide receiver Shawn Jefferson, and a 33-yard gain on a screen pass from quarterback Stan Humphries to running back Eric Bieniemy, the Chargers' longest play of the game. But after Humphries threw three incomplete passes, one of which was a perfectly thrown pass that Seay dropped in the end zone, they were forced to settle for kicker John Carney's 31-yard field goal, cutting their deficit to 28–10.

A 33-yard completion from Young to tight end Brent Jones helped the 49ers reach the San Diego 29-yard line on their next possession, but Young's third-down pass to Jones was overthrown, and kicker Doug Brien missed a 47-yard field goal attempt wide right. The Chargers then drove to their own 46-yard line, but 49ers cornerback Eric Davis intercepted Humphries' third-down pass intended for wide receiver Tony Martin in the end zone for a touchback with 10 seconds left in the half, and the score remained 28–10 at halftime. The Chargers' 18-point halftime deficit ended up being the closest scoring margin they would reach for the rest of the game.

=== Third quarter ===
The 49ers picked up right where they left off going into the second half. The Chargers were forced to punt after three plays on the opening drive of the half, and Carter returned the ball 11 yards to his own 38-yard line. Young subsequently completed two passes to Rice for 37 yards (including a 21-yard pass on 3rd-and-17) and a 16-yard pass to Taylor on a 7-play, 62-yard drive that ended with Watters' third touchdown of the game on a 9-yard run, increasing the 49ers' lead to 35–10. After a 33-yard kickoff return by wide receiver Andre Coleman, the Chargers advanced to the San Francisco 33-yard line, aided by a 23-yard reception by tight end Alfred Pupunu, but they turned the ball over on downs when Humphries' 4th-and-7 pass intended for Martin was broken up by Davis. Young then led San Francisco on a 10-play, 67-yard drive, aided by a 22-yard pass interference penalty against cornerback Darrien Gordon on 3rd-and-14, to score on his fifth touchdown pass, a 15-yard completion to Rice. But San Diego immediately responded when Coleman returned the ensuing kickoff 98 yards for a touchdown. Then Humphries completed a pass to Seay for a two-point conversion (the first in Super Bowl history; the rule had been adopted by the NFL at the start of the season), but it only cut the deficit to 42–18.

The 49ers were forced to punt on their next drive, but the Chargers ended up turning the ball over on downs again when Means was tackled for a 4-yard loss by safety Merton Hanks on 4th-and-1 from the San Diego 37.

=== Fourth quarter ===
Six plays later, after three runs by Watters for 25 yards, Young threw his record-setting sixth touchdown pass to Rice on a 7-yard completion with 13:49 remaining in the game, increasing the San Francisco lead to 49–18 and essentially ending any hopes of a San Diego comeback. The Chargers, now playing for pride, responded with a 13-play, 59-yard drive to reach the San Francisco 7-yard line. Humphries led his team down the field 12 yards for the first four plays, but hurt his ankle while being tackled by defensive tackle Bryant Young, and was temporarily replaced by Gale Gilbert, who completed two passes to Harmon for 24 yards, but threw an interception on 4th-and-6 to cornerback Deion Sanders, who returned the ball to the San Francisco 14-yard line. After two punts by the 49ers and an interception by San Francisco defensive back Toi Cook (during which Humphries returned to the game), the Chargers scored the final points of the game on a 67-yard, 8-play drive, which consisted of two receptions by Seay for 30 yards and two receptions by Martin for 42 yards, the second of which was caught for a 30-yard touchdown. TV viewers didn't see most of the play as ABC had cut to the 49ers celebrating on the sideline. Humphries then completed another pass for a two-point conversion, this time to Pupunu, to make the final score 49–26. The 49ers recovered the ensuing onside kick and ran time off the clock before punting to the San Diego 7. San Diego drove to the San Francisco 35 before the game ended. Once the 49ers victory was assured, Young said "somebody take the monkey off my back!" Years later, he regretted saying that saying this was a team effort not an individual performance.

At the end of the game, Young showed his jubilation at finally being able to win "the big one" while accepting the MVP trophy. "There were times when this was hard! But this is the greatest feeling in the world! No one — no one! — can ever take this away from us! No one, ever! It's ours!" Young and his teammates were equally enthusiastic in the locker room afterwards. "We're part of history," said guard Jesse Sapolu. "This is probably the best offense people will see in their lifetimes." "Is this great or what?" Young added. "I mean, I haven't thrown six touchdown passes in a game in my life. Then I throw six in the Super Bowl! Unbelievable."

Rice caught 10 passes for 149 yards and 3 touchdowns, tying his own record for most touchdown receptions in a Super Bowl, and becoming the first player ever to do it twice. He also recorded 10 rushing yards. Watters rushed for 47 yards and a touchdown, while also catching 3 passes for 61 yards and two touchdowns. Means, who rushed for 1,350 yards in the regular season, was held to just 33 yards in the game. Humphries finished 24 out of 49 for 275 yards and one touchdown, with two interceptions. Seay was the Chargers' top receiver with 7 receptions for 75 yards, while Ronnie Harmon added 8 catches for 68 yards. Defensive end Raylee Johnson had two sacks. Coleman's 8 kickoff returns for 244 yards and a touchdown set the following Super Bowl records: most kickoff returns in a Super Bowl, most kickoff return yards in a Super Bowl, and most combined net yards gained in a Super Bowl.

This was the first Super Bowl to have two players each score three touchdowns. Rice matched his Super Bowl XXIV performance with his three touchdown catches. Watters also had three touchdowns, matching Roger Craig's three touchdowns (two receiving and one rushing) in Super Bowl XIX. Watters also became the second running back to catch two touchdown passes in a game, matching Craig.

Ken Norton Jr. became the first player to win three straight Super Bowls, although as a member of two teams. Norton was a member of the Cowboys teams who won Super Bowls XXVII and XXVIII. Deion Sanders became the first player to play in both a Super Bowl and a World Series, playing in the 1992 World Series with the Atlanta Braves.

Chargers quarterback Gale Gilbert became the first player to be a member of five straight Super Bowl teams. Gilbert was a member of the Bills who played in four straight Super Bowls (XXV–XXVIII). Gilbert was on the losing team in all five Super Bowl games.

The 49ers' spectacular performance led to their offensive coordinator, Mike Shanahan, and defensive coordinator, Ray Rhodes, earning head coaching positions in 1995 for the Denver Broncos and the Philadelphia Eagles, respectively. Bobby Ross became the second coach, after Jimmy Johnson in Super Bowl XXVII, to lead a team to a college football national championship (Georgia Tech in 1990) and a Super Bowl. One year later, Barry Switzer would join Johnson as the only head coaches to win championships in both NCAA Division I-A (now FBS) college football and the NFL.

=== Box score ===
Super Bowl XXIX: San Francisco 49ers 49, San Diego Chargers 26

Quarter	1	2	3	4	Total
Chargers (AFC)	7	3	8	8	26
49ers (NFC)	14	14	14	7	49

at Joe Robbie Stadium, Miami, Florida

- Date: January 29, 1995
- Game time: 6:21 p.m. EST
- Game weather: 76 °F (24 °C), clear

Scoring summary

Quarter	Time	Drive			Team	Scoring information	Score	
Quarter	Time	Plays	Yards	TOP	Team	Scoring information	SD	SF
1	13:36	3	59	1:24	SF	Jerry Rice 44-yard touchdown reception from Steve Young, Doug Brien kick good	0	7
1	10:05	4	79	1:53	SF	Ricky Watters 51-yard touchdown reception from Young, Brien kick good	0	14
1	2:44	13	78	7:21	SD	Natrone Means 1-yard touchdown run, John Carney kick good	7	14
2	13:02	10	70	4:42	SF	William Floyd 5-yard touchdown reception from Young, Brien kick good	7	21
2	4:44	9	49	4:51	SF	Watters 8-yard touchdown reception from Young, Brien kick good	7	28
2	1:44	8	62	3:00	SD	31-yard field goal by Carney	10	28
3	9:35	7	62	3:45	SF	Watters 9-yard touchdown run, Brien kick good	10	35
3	3:18	10	67	4:07	SF	Rice 15-yard touchdown reception from Young, Brien kick good	10	42
3	3:01	—	—	—	SD	Andre Coleman 98-yard kickoff return for a touchdown, 2-point pass good (Stan Humphries to Mark Seay)	18	42
4	13:49	6	32	1:19	SF	Rice 7-yard touchdown reception from Young, Brien kick good	18	49
4	2:25	8	67	1:56	SD	Tony Martin 30-yard touchdown reception from Humphries, 2-point pass good (Humphries to Alfred Pupunu)	26	49
"TOP" = time of possession. For other American football terms, see Glossary of American football.							26	49

== Final statistics ==
Sources: NFL.com Super Bowl XXIX, Super Bowl XXIX Play Finder SF, Super Bowl XXIX Play Finder SD, USA Today Super Bowl XXIX Play by Play

=== Statistical comparison ===
	San Diego Chargers	San Francisco 49ers
First downs	20	28
First downs rushing	5	10
First downs passing	14	17
First downs penalty	1	1
Third down efficiency	6/16	7/13
Fourth down efficiency	0/4	0/0
Total net yards	354	455
Net yards rushing	67	139
Rushing attempts	19	32
Yards per rush	3.5	4.2
Passing – Completions/attempts	27/55	25/38
Times sacked-total yards	2–18	3–15
Interceptions thrown	3	0
Net yards passing	287	316
Punts-average yardage	4–48.8	5–39.8
Punt returns-total yards	3–1	2–12
Kickoff returns-total yards	8–244	4–48
Interceptions-total return yards	0–0	3–16
Penalties-total yards	6–63	3–18
Fumbles-lost	1–0	2–0
Time of possession	28:29	31:31
Turnovers	3	0

=== Individual statistics ===
Chargers passing
	C/ATT^{1}	Yds	TD	INT	Rating
Stan Humphries	24/49	275	1	2	56.1
Gale Gilbert	3/6	30	0	1	25.0
Chargers rushing
	Car^{2}	Yds	TD	LG^{3}	Yds/Car
Natrone Means	13	33	1	11	2.54
Ronnie Harmon	2	10	0	10	5.00
Shawn Jefferson	1	10	0	10	10.00
Gale Gilbert	1	8	0	8	8.00
Eric Bieniemy	1	3	0	3	3.00
Stan Humphries	1	3	0	3	3.00
Chargers receiving
	Rec^{4}	Yds	TD	LG^{3}	Target^{5}
Ronnie Harmon	8	68	0	20	10
Mark Seay	7	75	0	22	11
Alfred Pupunu	4	48	0	23	8
Tony Martin	3	59	1	30	12
Shawn Jefferson	2	15	0	9	10
Eric Bieniemy	1	33	0	33	1
Natrone Means	1	4	0	4	2
Duane Young	1	3	0	3	1

49ers passing
	C/ATT^{1}	Yds	TD	INT	Rating
Steve Young	24/36	325	6	0	134.8
Bill Musgrave	1/1	6	0	0	91.7
Elvis Grbac	0/1	0	0	0	39.6
49ers rushing
	Car^{2}	Yds	TD	LG^{3}	Yds/Car
Steve Young	5	49	0	21	9.80
Ricky Watters	15	47	1	13	3.13
William Floyd	9	32	0	6	3.56
Jerry Rice	1	10	0	10	10.00
Dexter Carter	1	1	0	1	1.00
Elvis Grbac	1	0	0	0	0.00
49ers receiving
	Rec^{4}	Yds	TD	LG^{3}	Target^{5}
Jerry Rice	10	149	3	44	13
John Taylor	4	43	0	16	7
William Floyd	4	26	1	9	4
Ricky Watters	3	61	2	51	4
Brent Jones	2	41	0	33	4
Ted Popson	1	6	0	6	2
Ed McCaffrey	1	5	0	5	2
Nate Singleton	0	0	0	0	1
Deion Sanders	0	0	0	0	1

^{1}Completions/attempts ^{2}Carries ^{3}Longest gain ^{4}Receptions ^{5}Times targeted

=== Records set ===
The following records were set in Super Bowl XXIX, according to the official NFL.com boxscore and the Pro-Football-Reference.com game summary.
Some records have to meet NFL minimum number of attempts to be recognized. The minimums are shown (in parentheses).

Player records set
Most points scored, career	42	Jerry Rice (San Francisco)
Most touchdowns, career	7	Jerry Rice (San Francisco)
Most touchdown passes, game	6	Steve Young (San Francisco)
Receiving records
Most yards, career	512 yards	Jerry Rice
Most receptions, career	28	Jerry Rice
Most receiving touchdowns, career	7	Jerry Rice
Combined yardage records ^{†}
Most yards gained, game	244 yards	Andre Coleman (San Diego)
Most yards gained, career	527 yards	Jerry Rice
Special teams
Most kickoff returns, game	8	Andre Coleman
Most kickoff return yards, game	244 yards	Andre Coleman
Highest punting average, game (4 punts)	48.75 yards (4–195)	Bryan Wagner (San Diego)
Most 2-point conversions, game	1	Mark Seay; Alfred Pupunu (San Diego)
Records tied
Most points scored, game	18	Jerry Rice; Ricky Watters (San Francisco)
Most touchdowns, game	3	Jerry Rice; Ricky Watters (San Francisco)
Most passing attempts, without interception, game	36	Steve Young
Most receiving touchdowns, game	3	Jerry Rice
Longest scoring play	98 yard kickoff return	Andre Coleman
Longest kickoff return	98 yards	Andre Coleman
Most kickoff returns for touchdowns, game	1	Andre Coleman
Most (one point) extra points, game	7	Doug Brien (San Francisco)

- † This category includes rushing, receiving, interception returns, punt returns, kickoff returns, and fumble returns.

Team records set
Most Super Bowl victories	5	49ers
Most passing touchdowns	6	49ers
Most two-point conversions, game	2	Chargers
Most kickoff return yards gained	244 yards	Chargers
Highest punting average, game (4 punts)	48.75 yards (4–195)	Chargers
Records tied
Most points, first quarter	14 points	49ers
Most (one point) extra points	7	49ers
Fewest turnovers, game	0	49ers
Most kickoff returns for touchdowns	1	Chargers

Turnovers are defined as the number of times losing the ball on interceptions and fumbles.

Records set, both team totals
	Total	49ers	Chargers
Most points	75 points	49	26
Most touchdowns	10	7	3
Most two-point conversions	2	0	2
Most passing attempts	93	38	55
Most kickoff return yards gained	292 yards	48	244
Records tied, both team totals
Most points, first quarter	21 points	14	7
Most passing touchdowns	7	6	1
Fewest fumbles lost	0	0	0
Most kickoff returns	12	4	8

== Starting lineups ==
Pro Football Hall of Fame‡

San Diego	Position	Position	San Francisco
Offense
Shawn Jefferson	WR		John Taylor
Harry Swayne	LT		Steve Wallace
Isaac Davis	LG		Jesse Sapolu
Courtney Hall	C		Bart Oates
Joe Cocozzo	RG		Derrick Deese
Stan Brock	RT		Harris Barton
Duane Young	TE		Brent Jones
Mark Seay	WR		Jerry Rice‡
Stan Humphries	QB		Steve Young‡
Alfred Pupunu	TE	RB	Ricky Watters
Natrone Means	RB		William Floyd
Defense
Chris Mims	LE		Dennis Brown
Shawn Lee	LT		Bryant Young‡
Reuben Davis	RT		Dana Stubblefield
Leslie O'Neal	RE		Rickey Jackson‡
David Griggs	LLB		Lee Woodall
Dennis Gibson	MLB		Gary Plummer
Junior Seau‡	RLB		Ken Norton Jr.
Darrien Gordon	LCB		Eric Davis
Dwayne Harper	RCB		Deion Sanders‡
Darren Carrington	SS		Tim McDonald
Stanley Richard	FS		Merton Hanks

== Officials ==
- Referee: Jerry Markbreit #9 fourth Super Bowl (XVII, XXI, XXVI)
- Umpire: Ron Botchan #110 third Super Bowl (XX, XXVII)
- Head linesman: Ron Phares #10 second Super Bowl (XVII)
- Line judge: Ron Baynes #56 first Super Bowl
- Back judge: Tim Millis #80 first Super Bowl
- Side judge: Tom Fincken #47 first Super Bowl
- Field judge: Jack Vaughan #93 third Super Bowl (XX, XXV)
- Alternate referee: Gerald Austin #34 (side judge for XXIV; later referee for XXXI and XXXV)
- Alternate umpire: Rex Stuart #103

Jerry Markbreit became the first official to serve as referee in four Super Bowls, a record that still stands.

Officials wore a black armband with number 42 to honor umpire Dave Hamilton, who died on January 9 at age 61 due to liver failure. Hamilton had completed his 20th season as an NFL official in 1994.

The day after the Super Bowl, Donnie Hampton, who had been a field judge since 1988, died of a heart attack at age 47. The officiating crew for the Pro Bowl one week later wore a second armband with Hampton's number 44.

== Aftermath ==
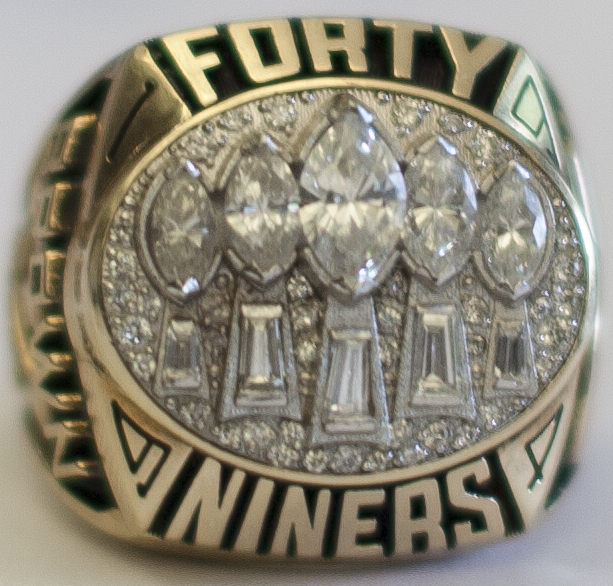
49ers Super Bowl XXIX ring, highlighting the team's four prior Super Bowl wins

As of the 2024 season, this is the only Super Bowl played between teams based in the same state. (Note: Four years prior to this game, Super Bowl XXV was played between the New York Giants and the Buffalo Bills. Although both teams brand themselves as a team from a major city in the state of New York, the Giants were (and still are) based just across the New York/New Jersey state line in East Rutherford.)

It is also the most recent Super Bowl title to date for the 49ers. They would play in three more in the 21st Century (Super Bowl XLVII, Super Bowl LIV and Super Bowl LVIII), but lost all of them.

As for the Chargers, the implications of their defeat were far worse in hindsight. This remains the only Super Bowl the Chargers have ever played in. Including the era before the AFL–NFL merger, it is the third championship game that the Chargers have lost. The AFL Championship in 1963 remains to this day as the only major sports championship the city of San Diego has won (and also the longest championship drought for any city that has at least two major sports franchises), so even though they were heavy underdogs, the loss still had great significance. The Chargers did not win another playoff game until the 2007 season, when they reached the AFC Championship Game but lost to the then-undefeated New England Patriots, 21–12. Super Bowl XXIX would be their only appearance while playing in San Diego before they moved to Los Angeles following the 2016 season.

=== Notable deaths from 1994 Chargers team ===
In addition, eight players from the 1994 Chargers Super Bowl team have died prior to reaching age 45. They include:

- David Griggs: died in a traffic collision in 1995 at age 28
- Rodney Culver: died in the crash of ValuJet Flight 592 in 1996 at age 26
- Doug Miller: killed by lightning strikes in 1998 at age 28
- Chris Mims: died of heart attack in 2008 at age 38
- Curtis Whitley: died from a drug overdose in 2008 at age 39
- Lewis Bush: died from cardiac arrest in 2011 at age 42
- Shawn Lee: died from cardiac arrest in 2011 at age 44
- Junior Seau: suicide with a firearm in 2012 at age 43
