= Kerry Goode =

American football player (born 1965)

No. 27, 22
- Position: Running back

Personal information
- Born: July 28, 1965 (age 61); Town Creek, Alabama, U.S.
- Listed height: 5 ft 11 in (1.80 m)
- Listed weight: 200 lb (91 kg)

Career information
- High school: Hazlewood (Town Creek)
- College: Alabama
- NFL draft: 1988: 7th round, 167th overall pick

Career history

Playing
- Tampa Bay Buccaneers (1988); Denver Broncos (1989)*; Miami Dolphins (1989)
- * Offseason or practice squad member only

Coaching
- New York Giants (1993–1997) Assistant strength & conditioning coach; St. Louis Rams (1998) Assistant strength & conditioning coach

Career NFL statistics
- Rushing yards: 231
- Rushing average: 3.7
- Receptions: 7
- Receiving yards: 68
- Stats at Pro Football Reference

Kerry Goode (born July 28, 1965) is an American former professional football player who played running back for four seasons for the Tampa Bay Buccaneers and Miami Dolphins.

== Early life ==
Goode led the Hazlewood Golden Bears to state championships both his junior and senior year while being selected as 2A player of the year in football.

== College career ==
Goode would go on to play college ball for Alabama where he was named freshman of year in the Southeastern Conference in 1983.

In the first game of the 1984 Alabama season against Boston College, Goode totaled 297 all-purpose yards with three touchdowns until sustaining a major knee injury in the third quarter that would plague him the rest of his playing days. Many observers believe had it not been for that injury, Goode might have become an all-time great at Alabama.

== Professional career ==
Goode was selected in the seventh round and 167th overall of the 1988 NFL draft by the Tampa Bay Buccaneers who was then coached by his former Alabama coach Ray Perkins. He played in 14 games with five starts for the Bucs in 1988, gaining 231 rushing yards. He played in one game for the 1989 Miami Dolphins, but another knee injury in that one game ended that season for him.

== Coaching career ==
He coached for the NFL New York Giants 1993–96, and St. Louis Rams 1997–99.

== Personal life ==
He is brother to Chris Goode, Pierre Goode, and Clyde Goode III, and cousin to Antonio Langham, all of whom played college football at Alabama.

Goode was diagnosed with Amyotrophic Lateral Sclerosis (Lou Gehrig disease) in 2015.
