= Chris Goode (American football) =

American football player (born 1963)

Miles Golden Bears
- Title: Head coach

Personal information
- Born: September 17, 1963 (age 63); Town Creek, Alabama, U.S.
- Listed height: 6 ft 0 in (1.83 m)
- Listed weight: 192 lb (87 kg)

Career information
- High school: Hazlewood (Town Creek, Alabama)
- College: Alabama
- NFL draft: 1987: 10th round, 253rd overall pick

Career history

Playing
- Indianapolis Colts (1987–1993)

Coaching
- Birmingham Steeldogs (2000–2004) Defensive coordinator; Goode Elite Prep (2017–2023); Miles (2025–present) Head coach

Career NFL statistics
- Interceptions: 7
- Fumble recoveries: 6
- Sacks: 2
- Stats at Pro Football Reference

Head coaching record
- Career: 3–8 (.273)

Chris Kimberly Goode (born September 17, 1963) is an American football coach and former player. He is the head football coach for Miles College, a position he has held since 2025. He is a former professional defensive back who played with the National Football League (NFL)'s Indianapolis Colts.

Pre-draft measurables
| Height | Weight | Arm length | Hand span | 40-yard dash | 10-yard split | 20-yard split | 20-yard shuttle | Vertical jump | Broad jump | Bench press |
|---|---|---|---|---|---|---|---|---|---|---|
| 5 ft 11 5/8 in (1.82 m) | 192 lb (87 kg) | 31 3/4 in (0.81 m) | 9 3/4 in (0.25 m) | 4.60 s | 1.60 s | 2.66 s | 4.25 s | 33.0 in (0.84 m) | 9 ft 8 in (2.95 m) | 2 reps |
All values from NFL Combine

Goode was drafted in the tenth round by the Colts in the 1987 NFL draft out of Alabama.

He recorded 2 sacks and 7 interceptions in his NFL career. In 1990, he returned a fumble 54 yards for a touchdown against the Miami Dolphins. Chris is the oldest of three brothers that would all eventually play football at The University of Alabama. He is also the first Goode brother to lead Town Creek's Hazlewood High School to a state championship during his senior year in 1981.

During that state championship season, Chris rushed for 1,528 yards and intercepted 11 passes. As impressive as those stats were, the senior did it while sharing time with his brother Kerry and other running backs. In one of these games, Goode compiled 269 yards on just six carries

Like his brothers, Chris's talent was not limited to the football field. Goode was a versatile player on the basketball court and won a track championship his junior year where he set a state hurdles record only to be broken by his brother, Pierre, several years later.

Chris signed with the University of North Alabama out of high school in 1982, but transferred to the Crimson Tide after one year as a running back.

== Family ==
Chris' brothers Clyde, Pierre, and former NFL running back Kerry Goode all starred at the University of Alabama, and he is a cousin of former NFL player Antonio Langham, also a former Crimson Tide star.

== Head coaching record ==
| Year | Team | Overall | Conference | Standing | Bowl/playoffs |
|---|---|---|---|---|---|
Miles Golden Bears (Southern Intercollegiate Athletic Conference) (2025–present)
| 2025 | Miles | 3–8 | 3–5 | T–7th | |
| 2026 | Miles | 0–0 | 0–0 | | |
| Miles: | | 3–8 | 3–5 | | |
| Total: | | 3–8 | | | |
