= Patrick Egu =

Nigerian gridiron football player (born 1967)

No. 33
- Position: Running back

Personal information
- Born: February 20, 1967 (age 59); Owerri, Nigeria
- Listed height: 5 ft 11 in (1.80 m)
- Listed weight: 205 lb (93 kg)

Career information
- High school: John F. Kennedy (Richmond, California, U.S.)
- College: Nevada
- NFL draft: 1989: 9th round, 230th overall pick

Career history
- Tampa Bay Buccaneers (1989)*; New England Patriots (1989); New York Jets (1990–1991)
- * Offseason or practice squad member only

Career NFL statistics
- Rushing yards: 20
- Rushing average: 6.7
- Touchdowns: 1
- Stats at Pro Football Reference

Okechukwu Patrick Egu // (born February 20, 1967) is a Nigerian American former professional football running back. He played several seasons for the National Football League (NFL)'s Tampa Bay Buccaneers, New England Patriots, and New York Jets.

Born in Nigeria, Egu attended John F. Kennedy High School in Richmond, California. He came to Nevada–Reno via Contra Costa College, and was selected in the ninth round, 230th overall by the Tampa Bay Buccaneers in the 1989 NFL draft.
