= Jesse Sapolu =

Samoan gridiron football player (born 1961)

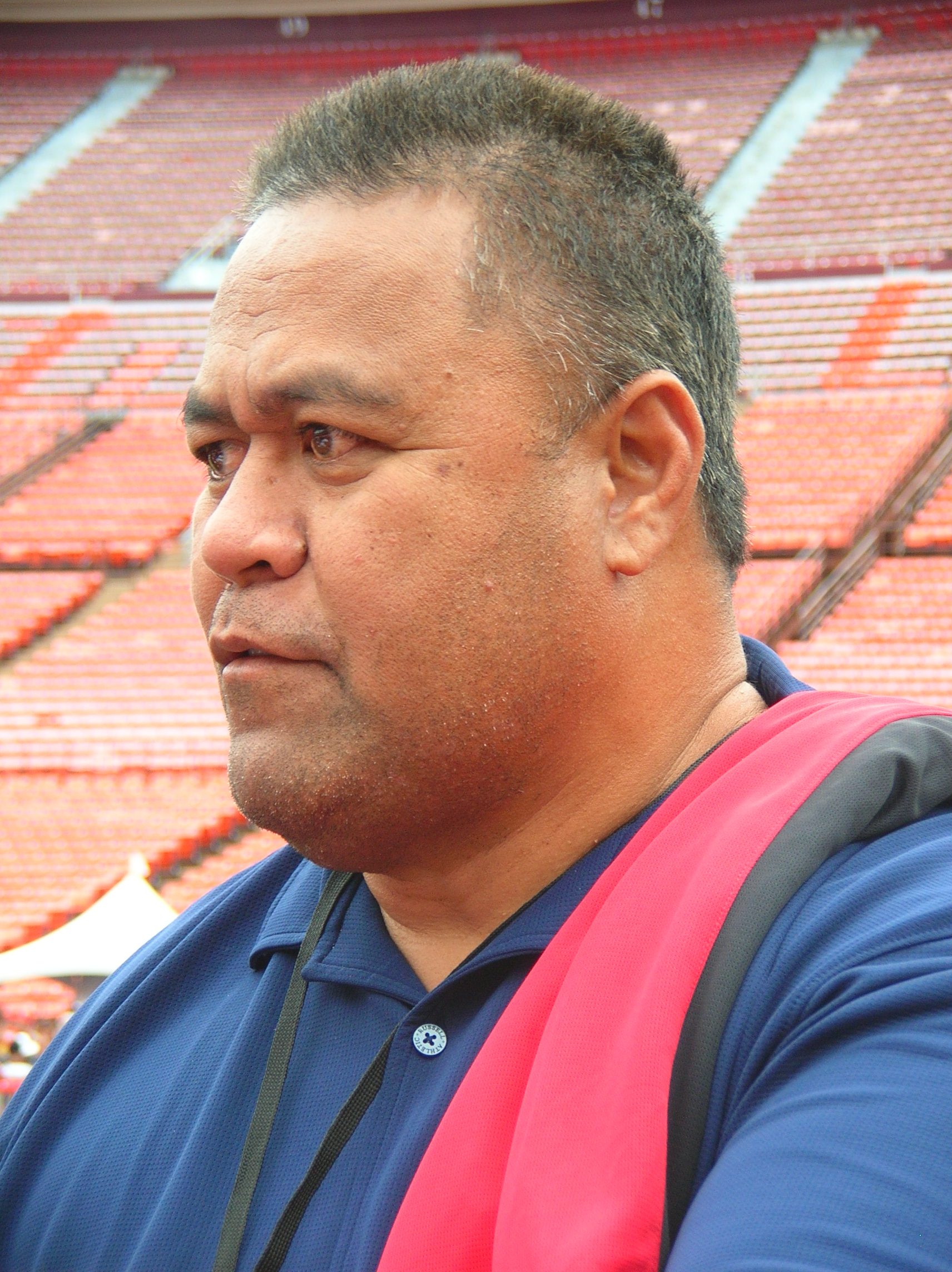

No. 61
- Positions: Center, guard

Personal information
- Born: March 10, 1961 (age 65); Apia, Samoa
- Listed height: 6 ft 4 in (1.93 m)
- Listed weight: 278 lb (126 kg)

Career information
- High school: Farrington (Honolulu, Hawaii, U.S.)
- College: Hawaii
- NFL draft: 1983: 11th round, 289th overall pick

Career history
- San Francisco 49ers (1983–1997)

Awards and highlights
- 4× Super Bowl champion (XIX, XXIII, XXIV, XXIX); 2× Pro Bowl (1993, 1994); First-team All-WAC (1980); Second-team All-WAC (1981)

Career NFL statistics
- Games played: 182
- Games started: 154
- Fumble recoveries: 1
- Stats at Pro Football Reference

Manase Jesse Sapolu (born March 10, 1961) is a Samoan former professional American football player in the National Football League (NFL). He played both center and offensive guard, and played his entire career for the San Francisco 49ers.

Sapolu attended Farrington High School and the University of Hawaii in Honolulu. Standing 6 feet 4 inches, 278 lbs., he was selected by the Oakland Invaders in the 17th round (199th pick overall) of the 1983 USFL draft, and selected by 49ers in the 11th round (289th pick overall) of the 1983 NFL draft. He signed with the 49ers on July 10, 1983.

Sapolu is one of six 49ers to own four Super Bowl championship rings (1984, 1988, 1989, and 1994), and the only one of those to earn a ring with the '94 team rather than their first title in 1981. He earned Pro Bowl honors in 1993 and 1994.

Since retiring in 1997, Sapolu and his wife Lisa have lived in Southern California, and remains active in the community as well with the 49ers alumni.

Sapolu has been an integral part in establishing the Polynesian Pro Football Hall of Fame, of which he is a co-founder. He now runs Men In The Trenches (MITT) in California.
