= Mark Carrier (wide receiver) =

American football player and administrator (born 1965)

Buffalo Bills
- Title: Player engagement director

Personal information
- Born: October 28, 1965 (age 61); Lafayette, Louisiana, U.S.
- Listed height: 6 ft 0 in (1.83 m)
- Listed weight: 186 lb (84 kg)

Career information
- High school: Church Point (Church Point, Louisiana)
- College: Nicholls State
- NFL draft: 1987: 3rd round, 57th overall pick
- Expansion draft: 1995: 16th round, 32nd overall pick

Career history

Playing
- Tampa Bay Buccaneers (1987–1992); Cleveland Browns (1993–1994); Carolina Panthers (1995–1998)

Operations
- Carolina Panthers (2011–2018) Director of player development; Carolina Panthers (2018–2019) Senior advisor to general manager; Carolina Panthers (2019–2020) Executive director of football staff; Buffalo Bills (2021–present) Player engagement director

Career NFL statistics
- Receptions: 569
- Receiving yards: 8,763
- Receiving touchdowns: 48
- Stats at Pro Football Reference

John Mark Carrier (born October 28, 1965) is an American former professional football player who was a wide receiver in the National Football League (NFL). He played college football for the Nicholls Colonels and was selected by the Tampa Bay Buccaneers in the third round of the 1987 NFL draft. He worked for the Carolina Panthers in their front office from 2011 to 2020, and was hired by the Buffalo Bills as their player engagement director in 2021.

== Early life ==
Born and raised in Lafayette, Louisiana, Carrier, raised by his mother, was a standout three-sport prep athlete at Church Point High School in football, basketball and track. He was all-state and all-conference as a senior with an average of 22 points and 12 rebounds per game in basketball. In track, he finished 3rd in the state of Louisiana in the 800 meter run after going undefeated the entire year. In football, he excelled as a receiver, defensive back and returner. He graduated with honors before attending Nicholls State University.

== College career ==
Carrier played college football at Nicholls State University and was named first-team Associated Press All-American and first-team Kodak All-American by the American Football Coaches Association (AFCA) in 1986. He finished his football career as the Colonels' all-time receiving leader in receptions (142), yards (2709), yards per catch (20.4) and 100 yard games (11). He helped lead his team to the Division 1AA National Championships eventually losing to Georgia Southern in the Quarterfinals, the eventual National Champions. He was voted into the Nicholls State University Hall of Fame. Once he retired for professional football, he later returned to Nicholls and graduated.

== Professional career ==
Pre-draft measurables
| Height | Weight | Arm length | Hand span | 40-yard dash | 10-yard split | 20-yard split | 20-yard shuttle | Vertical jump | Broad jump | Bench press |
|---|---|---|---|---|---|---|---|---|---|---|
| 5 ft 11 3/4 in (1.82 m) | 182 lb (83 kg) | 30 3/4 in (0.78 m) | 9 1/4 in (0.23 m) | 4.46 s | 1.54 s | 2.60 s | 4.51 s | 30.0 in (0.76 m) | 9 ft 6 in (2.90 m) | 9 reps |
All values from NFL Combine

Carrier played in 12 National Football League seasons from 1987 to 1998. A 1989 Pro Bowl selection for the Tampa Bay Buccaneers, Carrier caught a career-high 86 receptions for 1,422 yards and nine touchdowns that year. After six years with the Buccaneers, Carrier signed a 3-year contract with the Cleveland Browns where he experienced his first appearance in the playoffs. He was selected by the Carolina Panthers in the 1995 NFL expansion draft. Carrier ranks sixth all-time on the Carolina Panthers' all-time receiving list with 176 receptions and fifth in receiving yards with 2,547. On September 1, 1995, Carrier scored the first NFL points and touchdown in South Carolina (Memorial Stadium, Clemson University aka "Death Valley") for the Carolina Panthers. One year later, in September 1996, Carrier scored the first NFL touchdown in Charlotte at Ericsson Stadium (now known as Bank of America Stadium). He finished his 12-year career playing in 177 games, with 569 catches for 8763 yards averaging 15.4 yards per catch while scoring 48 touchdowns. He also averaged 10.9 yards per return with 229 yards on 21 returns with 1 touchdown.

== Front office career ==
After 12 years of retirement, Carrier returned to the Panthers to serve as director of player development for the Carolina Panthers. He was named senior advisor to the general manager on July 17, 2018, and promoted to executive director of football staff on May 9, 2019.

Carrier was hired by the Buffalo Bills as their player engagement director on March 17, 2021.

== NFL career statistics ==
=== Regular season ===
| Year | Team | Games | | Receiving | | | | |
| Year | Team | GP | GS | Rec | Yds | Avg | Lng | TD |
|---|---|---|---|---|---|---|---|---|
| 1987 | TB | 10 | 5 | 26 | 423 | 16.3 | 38 | 3 |
| 1988 | TB | 16 | 16 | 57 | 970 | 17.0 | 59 | 5 |
| 1989 | TB | 16 | 15 | 86 | 1,422 | 16.5 | 78 | 9 |
| 1990 | TB | 16 | 16 | 49 | 813 | 16.6 | 68 | 4 |
| 1991 | TB | 16 | 16 | 47 | 698 | 14.9 | 35 | 2 |
| 1992 | TB | 14 | 12 | 56 | 692 | 12.4 | 40 | 4 |
| 1993 | CLE | 16 | 16 | 43 | 746 | 17.3 | 55 | 3 |
| 1994 | CLE | 16 | 6 | 29 | 452 | 15.6 | 43 | 5 |
| 1995 | CAR | 16 | 14 | 66 | 1,002 | 15.2 | 66 | 3 |
| 1996 | CAR | 16 | 15 | 58 | 808 | 13.9 | 39 | 6 |
| 1997 | CAR | 9 | 6 | 33 | 436 | 13.2 | 36 | 2 |
| 1998 | CAR | 16 | 1 | 19 | 301 | 15.8 | 42 | 2 |
| Career | | 177 | 138 | 569 | 8,763 | 15.4 | 78 | 48 |
