= Jackie Walker (American football, born 1962) =

American football player (born 1962)

No. 56, 85, 72, 87
- Position: Linebacker

Personal information
- Born: November 3, 1962 (age 64); Monroe, Louisiana, U.S.
- Listed height: 6 ft 5 in (1.96 m)
- Listed weight: 245 lb (111 kg)

Career information
- High school: Carroll (Monroe, Louisiana)
- College: Jackson State
- NFL draft: 1986: 2nd round, 28th overall pick

Career history
- Tampa Bay Buccaneers (1986–1988); New York Jets (1989)*; Tampa Bay Buccaneers (1989); Cincinnati Rockers (1992); Miami Hooters (1993); Orlando Predators (1994–1995)
- * Offseason or practice squad member only
- Stats at Pro Football Reference

Jackie Walker (born November 3, 1962) is an American former professional football player who was a linebacker for the Tampa Bay Buccaneers of the National Football League (NFL). He was the 28th player selected in the 1986 NFL draft, the first player drafted in the second round of a year in which there were only 27 first-round picks. His selection was controversial, as he did not score particularly well in the pre-draft combines, and there were more-heralded linebackers still on the board. Walker attended Carroll High School in Monroe, Louisiana. He was a latecomer to organized sports, not playing football until high school coaches and his older brother convinced him to join the team in his senior year of high school. A quick and aggressive player, he was a starter all four years at Jackson State University, where he also played power forward for the basketball team. In his senior year, he led the team with 131 tackles, was named to two All-American teams, and was named Southwestern Athletic Conference Defensive Player of the Year. While the Buccaneers staff were impressed with his raw talent and saw him as a potential Ted Hendricks-type player, the fans were critical of the selection of a player with so little training and experience. Walker started only nine games for the Buccaneers, all in 1987. Although popular with teammates and a standout on special teams, he never worked his way into the regular lineup. Buccaneers coach Ray Perkins at one point toyed with the idea of taking advantage of his athleticism by converting him to tight end, but dropped the idea due to lack of interest from Walker. When Plan B free agency began in 1989, Walker was one of the players allowed to leave. He was signed by the New York Jets in 1989 after being left unprotected by the Buccaneers, but was cut from the Jets in training camp. He later played for the Cincinnati Rockers, Miami Hooters, and Orlando Predators of the Arena Football League.

== Awards ==
Southwestern Athletic Conference most valuable defensive player, 1985
1st Team All-American, 1985
