= Shawn Lee (American football) =

American football player (1966–2011)

No. 97, 98, 76
- Positions: Defensive tackle, defensive end

Personal information
- Born: October 24, 1966; Brooklyn, New York, U.S.
- Died: February 26, 2011 (aged 44); Raleigh, North Carolina, U.S.
- Listed height: 6 ft 2 in (1.88 m)
- Listed weight: 300 lb (136 kg)

Career information
- High school: Erasmus Hall (Brooklyn)
- College: North Alabama
- NFL draft: 1988: 6th round, 163rd overall pick

Career history
- Tampa Bay Buccaneers (1988–1989); Atlanta Falcons (1990)*; Miami Dolphins (1990–1991); San Diego Chargers (1992–1997); Chicago Bears (1998); Oakland Raiders (2000)*
- * Offseason or practice squad member only

Career NFL statistics
- Tackles: 292
- Sacks: 28.5
- Fumble recoveries: 5
- Stats at Pro Football Reference

Shawn Swaboda Lee (October 24, 1966 – February 26, 2011) was an American professional football player who was a defensive tackle for 11 seasons with the Tampa Bay Buccaneers (1988–89), Miami Dolphins (1990–91), San Diego Chargers (1992–97), and Chicago Bears (1998) in the National Football League (NFL). He was selected by Tampa Bay in the sixth round of the 1988 NFL draft. He played college football for the North Alabama Lions. Lee started in Super Bowl XXIX for the Chargers. He and fellow Chargers lineman Reuben Davis were nicknamed "The Two Tons of Fun".

Lee attended the University of North Alabama as a communications major. He was a co-founder of the Players Community Resource Center.

Lee, who had been struggling with diabetes for the past few years, died on February 26, 2011, from cardiac arrest brought on by double pneumonia. Lee was 44.
