= Bruce Hill (American football) =

American football player (born 1964)

No. 84
- Position: Wide receiver

Personal information
- Born: February 29, 1964 (age 62); Fort Dix, New Jersey, U.S.
- Listed height: 6 ft 0 in (1.83 m)
- Listed weight: 175 lb (79 kg)

Career information
- High school: Antelope Valley (Lancaster, California)
- College: Arizona State
- NFL draft: 1987: 4th round, 106th overall pick

Career history
- Tampa Bay Buccaneers (1987–1991)

Career NFL statistics
- Receptions: 190
- Receiving yards: 2,942
- Touchdowns: 23
- Stats at Pro Football Reference

Bruce Edward Hill (born February 29, 1964) is an American former professional football player who selected by the Tampa Bay Buccaneers in the fourth round of the 1987 NFL draft.

Pre-draft measurables
Height	Weight	40-yard dash	10-yard split	20-yard split	20-yard shuttle	Vertical jump	Broad jump
5 ft 11 3/4 in (1.82 m)	173 lb (78 kg)	4.49 s	1.61 s	2.63 s	4.03 s	30.5 in (0.77 m)	9 ft 8 in (2.95 m)
All values from NFL Combine

A 6'0", 175-lb. wide receiver from Arizona State, Hill played his entire National Football League (NFL) career for the Buccaneers from 1987 to 1991. His best year as a pro came during the 1988 season when he led all Tampa Bay receivers with 58 receptions for 1,040 yards and 9 touchdowns.

== NFL career statistics ==
Legend
**Bold**	Career high

Year	Team	Games		Receiving				
Year	Team	GP	GS	Rec	Yds	Avg	Lng	TD
1987	TAM	8	1	23	403	17.5	40	2
1988	TAM	14	14	**58**	**1,040**	**17.9**	42	**9**
1989	TAM	16	16	50	673	13.5	**53**	5
1990	TAM	13	13	42	641	15.3	48	5
1991	TAM	6	6	17	185	10.9	18	2
		57	50	190	2,942	15.5	53	23
