= Mike Simmonds =

American football player and coach (born 1964)

Current position
- Title: Offensive line coach
- Team: Indiana State
- Conference: MVFC

Biographical details
- Born: May 9, 1964 (age 62); Belleville, Illinois, U.S.
- Education: Belleville (IL) West; Indiana State University

Playing career
- 1983–1986: Indiana State
- 1987–1989: Tampa Bay Buccaneers
- 1990: San Diego Chargers

Coaching career (HC unless noted)
- 1991–1997: Hillsborough HS (FL) (assistant)
- 1998–2005: Jefferson HS (FL)
- 2006: South Florida (GA)
- 2007–2009: South Florida (OL)
- 2010: Indiana State (OL)
- 2011–2015: North Texas (OL)
- 2016: Eastern Illinois (OL)
- 2017: Northern Iowa (OL)
- 2018–2023: UTEP (OL)
- 2024–present: Indiana State (OL)

Head coaching record
- Overall: 75–29

Mike Simmonds (born May 9, 1964) is an American college football coach and former professional player who is the offensive line coach for Indiana State, a position he has held since 2024. He played as a guard in the National Football League (NFL).

Simmonds played collegiately for the Indiana State Sycamores.

Pre-draft measurables
Height	Weight	Arm length	Hand span	40-yard dash	10-yard split	20-yard split	20-yard shuttle	Vertical jump	Broad jump	Bench press
6 ft 3 7/8 in (1.93 m)	281 lb (127 kg)	32 1/2 in (0.83 m)	9 1/2 in (0.24 m)	5.28 s	1.79 s	3.02 s	4.55 s	25.5 in (0.65 m)	8 ft 3 in (2.51 m)	27 reps
All values from NFL Combine

He was selected in the 10th round of the 1987 NFL draft by the Tampa Bay Buccaneers in 1987. He spent three seasons there, he was activated from the practice squad for 5 games during the 1989 season. He spent one season on the San Diego Chargers practice squad.

He began his coaching career at Hillsborough High in Tampa before moving to Jefferson High as a head coach, during his seven-year tenure (1998–2005), his team reached the Florida High School Championship game three times (1998, 2002, 2004).

He started his college coaching career in 2005.
