= William Howard (American football) =

American football player (born 1964)

No. 43
- Position: Running back

Personal information
- Born: June 2, 1964 (age 62); Lima, Ohio, U.S.
- Listed height: 6 ft 0 in (1.83 m)
- Listed weight: 240 lb (109 kg)

Career information
- High school: Lima Senior
- College: Tennessee
- NFL draft: 1988: 5th round, 113th overall pick

Career history
- Tampa Bay Buccaneers (1988–1989); Phoenix Cardinals (1990)*
- * Offseason or practice squad member only

Awards and highlights
- Second-team All-SEC (1986)

Career NFL statistics
- Rushing yards: 809
- Rushing average: 3.6
- Rushing touchdowns: 2
- Stats at Pro Football Reference

William Dotson Howard (born June 2, 1964) is an American former professional football player who was a running back for two seasons with the Tampa Bay Buccaneers of the National Football League (NFL) from 1988 to 1989. He was selected by the Buccaneers in the fifth round of the 1988 NFL draft with the 113th overall pick. He played college football for the Tennessee Volunteers, leading the team in rushing and the Southeastern Conference (SEC) in scoring in 1986 season, and setting the NCAA record for most consecutive rushes by the same player (16).

Pre-draft measurables
Height	Weight	Hand span	40-yard dash	10-yard split	20-yard split	20-yard shuttle	Vertical jump	Broad jump	Bench press
5 ft 11 7/8 in (1.83 m)	242 lb (110 kg)	8 1/2 in (0.22 m)	4.89 s	1.73 s	2.81 s	4.42 s	26.0 in (0.66 m)	9 ft 8 in (2.95 m)	17 reps
