= Lars Tate =

American football player (1966–2022)

No. 34, 33
- Position: Running back

Personal information
- Born: February 2, 1966; Indianapolis, Indiana, U.S.
- Died: August 2, 2022 (aged 56); St. Petersburg, Florida, U.S.
- Listed height: 6 ft 2 in (1.88 m)
- Listed weight: 215 lb (98 kg)

Career information
- High school: North Central (Indianapolis)
- College: Georgia
- NFL draft: 1988: 2nd round, 53rd overall pick

Career history
- Tampa Bay Buccaneers (1988–1989); Chicago Bears (1990)

Awards and highlights
- 2× Second-team All-SEC (1986, 1987)

Career NFL statistics
- Rushing yards: 1,061
- Rushing average: 3.6
- Rushing touchdowns: 15
- Stats at Pro Football Reference

Lars Jamel Tate (February 2, 1966 – August 2, 2022) was an American professional football player who was a running back for three seasons in the National Football League (NFL). He was drafted in the second round (53rd overall) by the Tampa Bay Buccaneers and played for the Bucs and Chicago Bears from 1988 to 1990, having earlier played college football for the Georgia Bulldogs.

== Early life ==
Tate was born in Indianapolis, Indiana, on February 2, 1966. He attended North Central High School in his hometown, and was named Gatorade National High School Offensive Player of the Year as a high school senior. During his senior year in 1983, Tate rushed for 1,417 yards on 149 carries for a 9.5 average and 14 touchdowns, having rushed for 1,400 yards and scored 23 touchdowns the year before. He then studied at the University of Georgia, playing for the Georgia Bulldogs and leading the team in rushing during the 1986 and 1987 seasons. Tate was drafted by the Tampa Bay Buccaneers in the second round (53rd overall) of the 1988 NFL draft. He signed a three-year contract with an option for a fourth year in mid-July that year.

== Professional career ==
Tate made his NFL debut with the Buccaneers on September 4, 1988, at the age of 22, rushing 30 yards in a 41–14 loss against the Philadelphia Eagles. He subsequently had an 106-yard effort against the Detroit Lions in his eleventh game of the season. Another memorable game during his rookie year came when he scored a 46-yard touchdown after being flipped at the line of scrimmage and landing on his feet. During his first season, Tate led NFL rookie running backs in touchdowns (8), was the top rookie rusher in the National Football Conference (467 yards), and led the Buccaneers. The following year, he played 15 games (14 starts) and finished eighth in the league in rushing touchdowns (8), while again leading the franchise in rushing. He was nonetheless released after training camp before the start of the 1990 season.

Tate signed with the Chicago Bears in September 1990. However, he was limited to just three games with the team, due to a career-threatening neck injury that landed him on the injured reserve. He consequently became a conditional free agent after the Bears allowed his contract to expire and placed him on their unprotected list.

== Personal life ==
After retiring from professional football, Tate returned to school and studied towards a degree in economics. He also went into landscaping with his brother. He became sober three years before his death.

Tate was in a domestic partnership with Kelli Edwards in the three years prior to his death. He had three children: Stephan, Lauren, and Donavan. Donavan was drafted in the first round (third overall) of the 2009 Major League Baseball draft by the San Diego Padres and played six years in the minor leagues before injuries derailed his career. He then followed in his father's footsteps by briefly playing college football for the Arizona Wildcats as a quarterback.

Tate died of cardiac complications on August 2, 2022, at his home in St. Petersburg, Florida. He was 56, and had been diagnosed with esophageal cancer one month before his death.

== Statistics ==
Tate's stats with the Georgia Bulldogs
	Rushing					Receiving				
YEAR	ATT	YDS	AVG	LNG	TD	NO.	YDS	AVG	LNG	TD
1984	114	421	3.7	49	3	3	4	1.3	9	0
1985	105	626	6.0	40	3	2	9	4.5	8	0
1986	188	954	5.1	39	16	22	214	9.7	52	1
1987	208	1,016	4.9	44	14	13	149	11.5	22	0
Totals	615	3,017	4.9	49	36	41	376	9.4	52	1

Tate's stats in the NFL
	Rushing						Receiving				
YEAR	TEAM	ATT	YDS	AVG	LNG	TD	NO.	YDS	AVG	LNG	TD
1988	TAM	122	467	3.8	47	7	5	23	4.6	9	1
1989	TAM	167	589	3.5	48	8	11	75	6.8	19	1
1990	CHI	3	5	1.7	4	0	0	0	0.0	0	0
Totals	—	292	1,061	3.6	48	15	16	98	6.1	19	2
