= Robert Goff (American football) =

American football player (born 1965)

No. 94, 91
- Positions: Defensive end, defensive tackle

Personal information
- Born: October 2, 1965 (age 61); Rochester, New York, U.S.
- Listed height: 6 ft 3 in (1.91 m)
- Listed weight: 280 lb (127 kg)

Career information
- High school: Bayshore (Bradenton, Florida)
- College: Auburn
- NFL draft: 1988: 4th round, 83rd overall pick

Career history
- Tampa Bay Buccaneers (1988–1989); New Orleans Saints (1990–1995); Minnesota Vikings (1996); Tampa Bay Storm (1998–2001)

Career NFL statistics
- Tackles: 194
- Sacks: 11.5
- Fumble recoveries: 8
- Stats at Pro Football Reference

Robert Lamar Goff (born October 2, 1965), known as Pig Goff, is an American former professional football player for the New Orleans Saints of the National Football League (NFL). The defensive lineman was a fourth-round draft pick (83rd overall) in the 1988 NFL draft by the Tampa Bay Buccaneers out of Auburn.
