= Ray Perkins =

American football player and coach (1941–2020)

- Perkins in 1986

No. 27
- Position: Wide receiver

Personal information
- Born: November 6, 1941; Mt. Olive, Mississippi, U.S.
- Died: December 9, 2020 (aged 79); Tuscaloosa, Alabama, U.S.
- Listed height: 6 ft 3 in (1.91 m)
- Listed weight: 183 lb (83 kg)

Career information
- High school: Petal (Petal, Mississippi)
- College: Alabama (1964–1966)
- NFL draft: 1966: 7th round, 110th overall pick
- AFL draft: 1966: 5th round, 38th overall pick

Career history

Playing
- Baltimore Colts (1967–1971)

Coaching
- Mississippi State (1972) Assistant coach; New England Patriots (1974–1977) Wide receivers coach; San Diego Chargers (1978) Offensive coordinator; New York Giants (1979–1982) Head coach; Alabama (1983–1986) Head coach; Tampa Bay Buccaneers (1987–1990) Head coach; Arkansas State (1992) Head coach; New England Patriots (1993–1996) Offensive coordinator; Oakland Raiders (1997) Offensive coordinator; Cleveland Browns (1999) Tight ends coach; Cleveland Browns (2000) Running backs coach; Jones County (2012–2013) Head coach; Oak Grove HS (MS) (2014–2017) Volunteer coach

Operations
- Tampa Bay Buccaneers (1987–1990) VP of player personnel

Awards and highlights
- Super Bowl champion (V); NFL champion (1968); 2× National champion (1964, 1965); Consensus All-American (1966); First-team All-SEC (1966)

Career NFL statistics
- Receptions: 93
- Receiving yards: 1,538
- Receiving touchdowns: 11
- Stats at Pro Football Reference

Head coaching record
- Regular season: NCAA: 34–24–1 (.585); NFL: 42–75 (.359)
- Postseason: 1–1 (.500)
- Career: NCAA: 34–24–1 (.585); NFL: 43–76 (.361)
- Coaching profile at Pro Football Reference
- Executive profile at Pro Football Reference

Walter Ray Perkins (November 6, 1941 – December 9, 2020) was an American professional football coach and player. He played as a wide receiver for the University of Alabama and Baltimore Colts. He later worked as a football coach for 28 years, including stints as the head coach for the New York Giants, the University of Alabama, Tampa Bay Buccaneers, and Arkansas State University.

== Early life ==
Perkins was born in Mt. Olive, Mississippi, on November 6, 1941, and moved to Petal, Mississippi, near Hattiesburg, when he was three. He was known for his extraordinary work ethic as a youth in Petal, and was an All-America running back at Petal High School. For four years of high school, Perkins began each day by opening the service station across the street at 6 a.m., working there during his lunch break, and then closing the station at the end the day. He earned the high school nickname "Grease" due to the condition of his clothes from work.

== College career ==
He attended the University of Alabama, playing football from 1964 to 1966. He played for coach Bear Bryant and was a teammate of Pro Football Hall of Fame quarterbacks Joe Namath and Ken Stabler. Bryant moved Perkins from running back to receiver after Perkins suffered a serious head injury that led surgeons to drill three holes in his skull to reduce the pressure.

The Crimson Tide won national championships in both 1964 and 1965, and Southeastern Conference (SEC) championships in 1964, 1965, and 1966. During his senior year, he was named team captain. He was also selected as an All-American in 1966, as well as SEC Player of the Year. Bryant called Perkins the best offensive player on the two championship teams. Statistically, he had:

- 1964: 11 catches for 139 yards and 1 touchdown.
- 1965: 19 catches for 279 yards and 1 touchdown.
- 1966: 33 catches for 490 yards and 7 touchdowns.

Perkins was nicknamed the "Alabama Hummingbird".

== NFL career ==
The National Football League's Baltimore Colts selected Perkins in the 7th round of the 1966 NFL draft, 110th overall. The American Football League's (AFL) Boston Patriots drafted him in the 5th round of the 1966 AFL draft, 38th overall. He chose to play for the Colts.

Perkins played as a wide receiver for the Colts from 1967 to 1971, initially under future Hall of Fame head coach Don Shula. Perkins caught a 68-yard touchdown pass from Hall of Fame quarterback Johnny Unitas in the 1970 AFC Championship Game to lead the Colts to a 27–17 victory over the Oakland Raiders and a berth in Super Bowl V. Perkins went on to win a Super Bowl ring after the Colts beat the Dallas Cowboys in Super Bowl V.

He came to the Colts during Hall of Fame receiver Raymond Berry's final season, and learned film study from Berry. Perkins learned to read defenses from Unitas. His mentors Unitas, Berry, and Shula are on the NFL 100th Anniversary All-Time Team. While typically wary of inexperienced receivers, Unitas accepted Perkins as a rookie because of his skills and understanding of the game.

Perkins finished his NFL career after several knee surgeries.

== Coaching career ==
After one year out of football, working in real estate, Perkins was hired as a receivers coach at Mississippi State University.

Perkins next coached in the NFL as an assistant for the New England Patriots (1974–1977) and San Diego Chargers (1978) before becoming head coach of the New York Giants from 1979 to 1982. In his third season, he led the Giants to the playoffs for the first time in 18 years. Although this would be his only winning season, he helped build the team that his successor, Hall of Famer Bill Parcells, won two Super Bowls with in 1986 and 1990. Perkins hired future NFL head coaches Parcells, Bill Belichick (member of the NFL 100th Anniversary All-Time Team), and Romeo Crennel as young assistants. He was the first NFL coach for future Most Valuable Player and Hall of Fame linebacker Lawrence Taylor, who Perkins personally scouted before selecting Taylor in the draft, and future Super Bowl Most Valuable Player Phil Simms. Parcells and Belichick consider Perkins a mentor, and Parcells has said Perkins was the only reason he was in pro football.

When Bryant retired after the 1982 season, Perkins took on the daunting task of succeeding him at Alabama; he was hired with three games to coach for the Giants. He coached the Crimson Tide for four years from 1983 to 1986, compiling a record of 32–15–1. However, he went 5–6 in 1984, the school's first losing season since 1957, the year before Bryant arrived in Tuscaloosa. His teams never won more than four games in SEC play. Although he went to three bowl games and won them all during his tenure, it was far short of what Alabama fans had come to expect. Increasing pressure from boosters and alumni at Alabama made Perkins receptive to a lucrative contract offer from the Tampa Bay Buccaneers after the 1986 Alabama season.

Perkins served as head coach and general manager of the Tampa Bay Buccaneers from 1987 to 1990. Some of his former college players got a chance to play for him in the NFL: quarterback Mike Shula, Kurt Jarvis, and linebacker Keith McCants. His career coaching record in the NFL was 42–75. He never won more than five games in Tampa Bay; his tenure came during an NFL-record streak of 12 consecutive 10-loss seasons. He was fired in December of the 1990 season, and replaced by his offensive coordinator, fellow Alabama alumnus Richard Williamson.

Perkins returned to college coaching at Arkansas State University in 1992. After just one year, Perkins became the offensive coordinator of the New England Patriots, serving under Bill Parcells from 1993 to 1996, including Super Bowl XXXI. He also spent 1997 with the Oakland Raiders as an offensive coordinator, a difficult season where he was in conflict with owner Al Davis.

On December 20, 2011, he was introduced as the new head football coach at Jones County Junior College (JCJC) in Ellisville, Mississippi. Perkins resigned from JCJC on December 24, 2013. He resided in Hattiesburg, Mississippi. In 2014, he was said to be taking a volunteer coaching role with Oak Grove High School in Hattiesburg. He became a coach with the school from 2014–17.

=== Recruitment allegations ===
In 1992, former Alabama player Gene Jelks, who had been recruited by Perkins, publicly accused Alabama coaches and boosters of providing him with illegal cash payments and other inducements during his recruitment and years at Alabama (Jelks played from 1985 to 1989). Jelks's charges resulted in a National Collegiate Athletic Association (NCAA) investigation of the Alabama football program. Perkins's former assistant coach Jerry Pullen sued Jelks for slander, but he lost that case and two subsequent appeals, including an appeal to the Georgia Supreme Court.

== Death ==
Perkins died at his home on the morning of December 9, 2020, at 79 years old. He is one of at least 345 NFL players to be diagnosed after death with chronic traumatic encephalopathy (CTE), which is caused by repeated hits to the head. Ironically, after his first high school football game doctors had told him not to play football after he suffered a back injury and it was discovered he was missing a vertebra. He received similar medical advice after his first year at Alabama, when he suffered a serious head injury in practice, just before the start of his sophomore season, in a head-to-head collision with one of the team's linebackers. He did not play the season, and during treatment, three holes were drilled into his head to relieve the pressure.

== Honors ==
- SEC Player of the Year, 1966
- First-Team All-American, Split end, 1966
- Inducted into the Alabama Sports Hall of Fame, Class of 1990
- Inducted into the Mississippi Sports Hall of Fame, Class of 1998
- Elected to the Senior Bowl Hall of Fame in 2005

== Head coaching record ==
=== College ===
Year	Team	Overall	Conference	Standing	Bowl/playoffs	Coaches^{#}	AP^{°}
Alabama Crimson Tide (Southeastern Conference) (1983–1986)
1983	Alabama	8–4	4–2	T–3rd	W Sun	12	15
1984	Alabama	5–6	2–4	T–7th			
1985	Alabama	9–2–1	4–1–1	T–3rd	W Aloha	14	13
1986	Alabama	10–3	4–2	T–2nd	W Sun	9	9
Alabama:		32–15–1	14–9–1				
Arkansas State Indians (NCAA Division I-A independent) (1992)
1992	Arkansas State	2–9					
Arkansas State:		2–9					
Total:		34–24–1					
^{#}Rankings from final Coaches Poll.; ^{°}Rankings from final AP Poll.

=== NFL ===
Team	Year	Regular season					Postseason			
Team	Year	Won	Lost	Ties	Win %	Finish	Won	Lost	Win %	Result
NYG	1979	6	10	0	.375	4th in NFC East	–	–	–	–
NYG	1980	4	12	0	.250	5th in NFC East	–	–	–	–
NYG	1981	9	7	0	.563	3rd in NFC East	1	1	.500	Lost to San Francisco 49ers in NFC Divisional Game
NYG	1982	4	5	0	.444	10th in NFC	–	–	–	–
NYG Total		23	34	0	.404		1	1	.500	
TB	1987	4	11	0	.267	4th in NFC Central	–	–	–	–
TB	1988	5	11	0	.313	3rd in NFC Central	–	–	–	–
TB	1989	5	11	0	.313	5th in NFC Central	–	–	–	–
TB	1990	5	8	0	.385	2nd in NFC Central	–	–	–	–
TB Total		19	41	0	.317		–	–	–	
Total		42	75	0	.359		1	1	.500	

== See also ==
- History of the New York Giants (1979–1993)
- List of NFL players with chronic traumatic encephalopathy
- New England Patriots strategy
