= Donnie Elder =

American football player (born 1962)

No. 37, 43, 40, 28
- Position: Cornerback

Personal information
- Born: December 13, 1962 (age 63); Chattanooga, Tennessee, U.S.
- Listed height: 5 ft 9 in (1.75 m)
- Listed weight: 175 lb (79 kg)

Career information
- High school: Brainerd (Chattanooga, Tennessee)
- College: Memphis
- NFL draft: 1985: 3rd round, 67th overall pick

Career history
- New York Jets (1985); Pittsburgh Steelers (1986); Detroit Lions (1986–1987); Tampa Bay Buccaneers (1988–1989); Miami Dolphins (1990); San Diego Chargers (1990-1992); Detroit Lions (1993)*
- * Offseason or practice squad member only

Career NFL statistics
- Interceptions: 6
- Fumble recoveries: 5
- Return yards: 3,040
- Stats at Pro Football Reference

Donald Elder (born December 13, 1962) is an American former professional football player who was a cornerback for six seasons for the New York Jets, Detroit Lions, Pittsburgh Steelers, Tampa Bay Buccaneers, and San Diego Chargers. He was selected by the Jets in the third round of the 1985 NFL draft with the 67th overall pick. * Second team All-South Independent (1984)
