= Curt Jarvis =

American football player (born 1965)

No. 95
- Position: Defensive tackle

Personal information
- Born: January 28, 1965 (age 61); Birmingham, Alabama, U.S.
- Listed height: 6 ft 2 in (1.88 m)
- Listed weight: 266 lb (121 kg)

Career information
- High school: Gardendale (Gardendale, Alabama)
- College: Alabama
- NFL draft: 1987: 7th round, 169th overall pick

Career history
- Tampa Bay Buccaneers (1987–1990)

Awards and highlights
- Second-team All-SEC (1986)

Career NFL statistics
- Sacks: 8.5
- Fumble recoveries: 2
- Stats at Pro Football Reference

Curtis Versil Jarvis Jr. (born January 28, 1965) is an American former professional football player who was a defensive tackle in the National Football League (NFL). He was selected by the Tampa Bay Buccaneers in the seventh round of the 1987 NFL draft. He played college football for the Alabama Crimson Tide.

Pre-draft measurables
Height	Weight	Arm length	Hand span	40-yard dash	10-yard split	20-yard split	20-yard shuttle	Vertical jump	Broad jump	Bench press
6 ft 1 in (1.85 m)	266 lb (121 kg)	30 1/4 in (0.77 m)	9 1/4 in (0.23 m)	5.08 s	1.77 s	2.94 s	4.69 s	24.5 in (0.62 m)	7 ft 8 in (2.34 m)	15 reps
All values from NFL Combine
