= Sidney Coleman (American football) =

American football player (born 1964)

No. 53, 93, 50
- Position: Linebacker

Personal information
- Born: January 14, 1964 (age 62); Gulfport, Mississippi, U.S.
- Listed height: 6 ft 2 in (1.88 m)
- Listed weight: 250 lb (113 kg)

Career information
- High school: Harrison Central
- College: Southern Miss
- NFL draft: 1988: undrafted

Career history
- Tampa Bay Buccaneers (1988–1990); Phoenix Cardinals (1991); Tampa Bay Buccaneers (1992); Detroit Lions (1993)*
- * Offseason or practice squad member only

Awards and highlights
- PFWA All-Rookie Team (1988); Second Team All-South Independent (1987)

Career NFL statistics
- Fumble recoveries: 1
- Stats at Pro Football Reference

Sidney Coleman (born January 14, 1964) is an American former professional football player who was a linebacker for five seasons in the National Football League (NFL). He played for the Tampa Bay Buccaneers from 1988 to 1990, for the Arizona Cardinals in 1991, and again for the Buccaneers in 1992.
