= Harry Swayne =

American football player (born 1965)

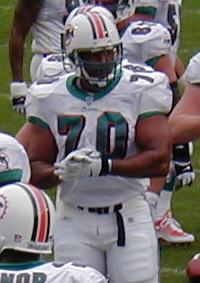
- Swayne with the Miami Dolphins in 2001

No. 70, 72, 74
- Position: Offensive tackle

Personal information
- Born: February 2, 1965 (age 61); Philadelphia, Pennsylvania, U.S.
- Listed height: 6 ft 5 in (1.96 m)
- Listed weight: 300 lb (136 kg)

Career information
- High school: Dougherty (Philadelphia)
- College: Rutgers
- NFL draft: 1987: 7th round, 190th overall pick

Career history
- Tampa Bay Buccaneers (1987–1990); San Diego Chargers (1991–1996); Denver Broncos (1997–1998); Baltimore Ravens (1999–2000); Miami Dolphins (2001)

Awards and highlights
- 3× Super Bowl champion (XXXII, XXXIII, XXXV); Second-team All-East (1986)

Career NFL statistics
- Games played: 186
- Games started: 113
- Fumble recoveries: 2
- Stats at Pro Football Reference

Harry Vonray Swayne (born February 2, 1965) is an American former professional football player who was an offensive tackle in the National Football League (NFL). He played college football with the Rutgers Scarlet Knights. Swayne was selected by the Tampa Bay Buccaneers in the seventh round of the 1987 NFL draft with the 190th overall pick. He is one of the few players to have started a Super Bowl with three teams: Super Bowl XXIX with the San Diego Chargers, Super Bowl XXXIII with the Denver Broncos and Super Bowl XXXV with the Ravens.

He was the chaplain for the Chicago Bears before becoming the assistant player development director for the Baltimore Ravens. Harry and his wife Dawn have five children.
