= John Cannon (American football) =

American football player (born 1960)

No. 78
- Position: Defensive end

Personal information
- Born: July 30, 1960 (age 66); Long Branch, New Jersey, U.S.
- Listed height: 6 ft 5 in (1.96 m)
- Listed weight: 250 lb (113 kg)

Career information
- High school: Holmdel (Holmdel Township, New Jersey)
- College: William & Mary
- NFL draft: 1982: 3rd round, 83rd overall pick

Career history
- Tampa Bay Buccaneers (1982–1990)

Career NFL statistics
- Sacks: 22
- Fumble recoveries: 11
- Interceptions: 1
- Stats at Pro Football Reference

John Cannon (born July 30, 1960) is an American former professional football player who attended Holmdel High School in Holmdel, New Jersey and played defensive end for nine seasons in the National Football League (NFL) for the Tampa Bay Buccaneers.
