= Ervin Randle =

American football player (born 1962)

No. 54, 55
- Position: Linebacker

Personal information
- Born: October 12, 1962 (age 64); Hearne, Texas, U.S.
- Listed height: 6 ft 1 in (1.85 m)
- Listed weight: 250 lb (113 kg)

Career information
- High school: Hearne
- College: Baylor
- NFL draft: 1985: 3rd round, 64th overall pick

Career history
- Tampa Bay Buccaneers (1985–1990); Kansas City Chiefs (1991–1992); Green Bay Packers (1993)*
- * Offseason or practice squad member only

Awards and highlights
- First-team All-SWC (1984); Second-team All-SWC (1983)

Career NFL statistics
- Sacks: 8
- Interceptions: 1
- Fumble recoveries: 3
- Stats at Pro Football Reference

Ervin L. Randle (born October 12, 1962) is an American former professional football player who was a linebacker in the National Football League (NFL) from 1985 to 1992 for the Tampa Bay Buccaneers and Kansas City Chiefs. He attended Baylor University, where he played college football. He was selected by the Buccaneers in the third round of the 1985 NFL draft. He is the older brother of Hall of Famer John Randle.

Randle played a total of 105 games during his eight years in the NFL. On defense, he had a total of eight sacks and one interception. He also returned the ball one time in 1986 while playing for the Buccaneers. He played six seasons with the Buccaneers before being traded to the Chiefs for his last two years in the league. He was known for playing with intensity, to the extent that he was awarded the NFL "Hit Of The Year" Award in 1987.

After retiring from the NFL, Ervin worked as a car salesman. Currently he owns Classic Chevrolet in Lawton, Oklahoma.

His eldest son Cameron was killed while biking by a drunk driver on November 23, 2017.
