= Frank Pillow =

American football player (born 1965)

No. 80, 85
- Position: Wide receiver

Personal information
- Born: March 11, 1965 (age 61); Nashville, Tennessee, U.S.
- Listed height: 5 ft 10 in (1.78 m)
- Listed weight: 170 lb (77 kg)

Career information
- High school: Whites Creek (Nashville)
- College: Tennessee State
- NFL draft: 1988: 11th round, 279th overall pick

Career history
- Tampa Bay Buccaneers (1988–1990); Detroit Lions (1991)*; Winnipeg Blue Bombers (1992); Indianapolis Colts (1993)*
- * Offseason or practice squad member only

Career NFL statistics
- Receptions: 23
- Receiving yards: 324
- Touchdowns: 1
- Stats at Pro Football Reference

William Frank Pillow Jr. (born March 11, 1965) is an American former professional wide receiver in the National Football League (NFL). He was selected out of Tennessee State University by the Tampa Bay Buccaneers in the 11th round of the 1988 NFL draft with the 279th overall pick.
