= Odie Harris =

American football player (born 1966)

No. 20, 38, 31, 27
- Positions: Cornerback, safety

Personal information
- Born: April 1, 1966 (age 60); Bryan, Texas, U.S.
- Listed height: 6 ft 0 in (1.83 m)
- Listed weight: 190 lb (86 kg)

Career information
- High school: Bryan
- College: Sam Houston
- NFL draft: 1988: undrafted

Career history
- Tampa Bay Buccaneers (1988–1990); Dallas Cowboys (1991)*; Cleveland Browns (1991–1992); Phoenix/Arizona Cardinals (1992-1994); Houston Oilers (1995); Edmonton Eskimos (1998)
- * Offseason or practice squad member only

Career NFL statistics
- Tackles: 90
- Interceptions: 5
- Fumble recoveries: 3
- Stats at Pro Football Reference

Odie Lazar Harris Jr. (born April 1, 1966) is an American former professional football player who played safety and cornerback for eight seasons in the National Football League (NFL).
