= Reuben Davis (American football) =

American football player (born 1965)

No. 79, 93
- Position: Defensive lineman

Personal information
- Born: May 7, 1965 (age 61); Greensboro, North Carolina, U.S.
- Listed height: 6 ft 5 in (1.96 m)
- Listed weight: 320 lb (145 kg)

Career information
- High school: Grimsley (Greensboro)
- College: North Carolina
- NFL draft: 1988: 9th round, 225th overall pick

Career history
- Tampa Bay Buccaneers (1988–1992); Phoenix Cardinals (1992–1993); San Diego Chargers (1994–1998)

Career NFL statistics
- Sacks: 20.5
- Interceptions: 1
- Touchdowns: 1
- Stats at Pro Football Reference

Reuben Cordell Davis (born May 7, 1965) is an American former professional football player who was a defensive lineman in the National Football League (NFL). He played college football for the North Carolina Tar Heels and was selected by the Tampa Bay Buccaneers in the ninth round of the 1988 NFL draft. Davis was a starting member of San Diego's 1994 Super Bowl team.

Davis also contributed to Chargers huge win against the Dolphins in 1994-1995 with a safety which helped the Chargers 22-21 in the Divisional game
