= List of NFL players (T) =

This is a list of players who have appeared in at least one regular season or postseason game in the National Football League (NFL), American Football League (AFL), or the All-America Football Conference (AAFC) and have a last name that starts with "T". This list is accurate through the end of the 2025 NFL season.

== Ta ==
- Alameda Ta'amu
- Paul Tabor
- Phil Tabor
- Teez Tabor
- Doyle Tackett
- Cookie Tackwell
- Joe Taffoni
- Joe Tafoya
- Jerry Tagge
- John Tagliaferri
- Tua Tagovailoa
- Naufahu Tahi
- Joe Taibi
- Taki Taimani
- Art Tait
- John Tait
- Sione Takitaki
- Bob Talamini
- Kelly Talavou
- Diron Talbert
- Don Talbert
- John Talbot
- Jim Talbott
- Dan Talcott
- George Taliaferro
- Lorenzo Taliaferro
- Mike Taliaferro
- Aqib Talib
- Dave Tallant
- Ben Talley
- Darryl Talley
- John Talley
- Julian Talley
- Ronald Talley
- Stan Talley
- Charlie Tallman
- Ken Talton
- Tyree Talton
- Ben Tamburello
- Sam Tamburo
- Ralph Tamm
- Jacob Tamme
- T.J. Tampa
- George Tandy
- Keith Tandy
- Bill Tanguay
- Cordrea Tankersley
- Ryan Tannehill
- Steve Tannen
- Barron Tanner
- Bob Tanner
- Hamp Tanner
- John Tanner (born 1897)
- John Tanner (born 1945)
- Phillip Tanner
- Alex Tanney
- Jay Tant
- Maa Tanuvasa
- Thomas Tapeh
- Darryl Tapp
- Charles Tapper
- George Tarasovic
- Bruce Tarbox
- Richard Tardits
- Fran Tarkenton
- Jim Tarle
- Jeff Tarpinian
- A. J. Tarpley
- Jerry Tarr
- Jim Tarr
- Bob Tarrant
- Jimmy Tarrant
- Teair Tart
- Jaquiski Tartt
- John Tarver
- Carl Taseff
- Pasoni Tasini
- Steve Tasker
- Damon Tassos
- Bob Tatarek
- Auden Tate
- Ben Tate
- Brandon Tate
- David Tate
- Franklin Tate
- Golden Tate
- John Tate
- Lars Tate
- Robert Tate
- Rodney Tate
- Willy Tate
- Pete Tatman
- Jack Tatum
- Jess Tatum
- Kinnon Tatum
- Lofa Tatupu
- Mosi Tatupu
- Josiah Tauaefa
- Will Taʻufoʻou
- Biff Taugher
- Pita Taumoepenu
- Terry Tausch
- Mark Tauscher
- Junior Tautalatasi
- John Tautolo
- Terry Tautolo
- Jahlani Tavai
- J. R. Tavai
- Giorgio Tavecchio
- John Tavener
- Josh Taves
- Aaron Taylor
- Adarius Taylor
- Alontae Taylor
- Alphonso Taylor
- Altie Taylor
- Ben Taylor
- Billy Taylor
- Bob Taylor
- Bobby Taylor
- Brandon Taylor
- Branson Taylor
- Brian Taylor
- Bruce Taylor
- Charley Taylor
- Chester Taylor
- Chris Taylor
- Chuck Taylor (born January 12, 1920)
- Chuck Taylor (born January 24, 1920)
- Cliff Taylor
- Cooper Taylor
- Cordell Taylor
- Corky Taylor
- Courtney Taylor
- Craig Taylor
- Curtis Taylor
- Darrell Taylor
- David Taylor
- Davion Taylor
- Demetrius Taylor
- Derrick Taylor
- Devin Taylor
- Ed Taylor
- Eric Taylor
- Erk Taylor
- Fred Taylor
- Gene Taylor
- Greg Taylor
- Henry Taylor
- Herb Taylor
- Hilee Taylor
- Hosea Taylor
- Hugh Taylor
- Ike Taylor
- J. J. Taylor
- J. T. Taylor
- Jamaar Taylor
- Jamar Taylor
- Ja'Sir Taylor
- Jason Taylor
- Jason Taylor II
- Jawaan Taylor
- Jay Taylor (born 1967)
- Jay Taylor (born 1976)
- Jesse Taylor
- Jim Taylor (born 1934)
- Jim Taylor (born 1935)
- Jim Bob Taylor
- Joe Taylor
- John Taylor
- Johnny Taylor
- Jonathan Taylor
- Jordan Taylor
- Jullian Taylor
- Keith Taylor (born 1964)
- Keith Taylor (born 1998)
- Ken Taylor
- Kerry Taylor
- Kitrick Taylor
- Lane Taylor
- Lawrence Taylor
- Leland Taylor
- Lenny Taylor
- Lionel Taylor
- Leonard Taylor III
- Malcolm Taylor
- Malik Taylor
- Mason Taylor
- Michael Taylor
- Mike Taylor
- Otis Taylor
- Patrick Taylor
- Phil Taylor
- Reese Taylor
- Rob Taylor
- Roger Taylor
- Rosey Taylor
- Ryan Taylor (born 1976)
- Ryan Taylor (born 1987)
- Sammie Taylor
- Sean Taylor
- Shakial Taylor
- Shannon Taylor
- Stepfan Taylor
- Steve Taylor
- Tarzan Taylor
- Taywan Taylor
- Terry Taylor
- Tom Taylor
- Tony Taylor (born 1978)
- Tony Taylor (born 1984)
- Tory Taylor
- Travis Taylor
- Trent Taylor
- Trey Taylor
- Troy Taylor
- Tyrod Taylor
- Vincent Taylor
- Willie Taylor
- Cam Taylor-Britt
- Dadrion Taylor-Demerson
- Alex Taylor-Prioleau
- Jimmy Tays

== Te ==
- Guy Teafatiller
- George Teague
- Matthew Teague
- Pat Teague
- Trey Teague
- Jim Teal
- Jimmy Teal
- Quinton Teal
- Willie Teal
- Roderic Teamer
- Larry Tearry
- Gus Tebell
- Tim Tebow
- Sam Tecklenburg
- John Teerlinck
- Al Teeter
- Mike Teeter
- Len Teeuws
- Lance Teichelman
- Mike Teifke
- Randall Telfer
- Kadeem Telfort
- Marvell Tell III
- Wyatt Teller
- John Teltschik
- Jim Temp
- Mark Temple
- Matt Tennant
- Garth TenNapel
- Derek Tennell
- Bob Tenner
- Steve Tensi
- Luke Tenuta
- Manti Te'o
- Daniel Te'o-Nesheim
- Lou Tepe
- Mike Tepper
- Scott Tercero
- Tony Teresa
- Joe Tereshinski
- George Terlep
- A. J. Terrell
- Claude Terrell
- Daryl Terrell
- David Terrell (born 1975)
- David Terrell (born 1979)
- Marvin Terrell
- Pat Terrell
- Ray Terrell
- Steven Terrell
- Craig Terrill
- Adam Terry
- Chris Terry
- Corey Terry
- Doug Terry
- Jeb Terry
- Joe Terry
- Nat Terry
- Rick Terry
- Ryan Terry
- Tim Terry
- Rudy Tersch
- Isaac TeSlaa
- Ray Tesser
- Vinny Testaverde
- Don Testerman
- Deral Teteak
- Martin Tevaseu
- Sam Tevi
- Lee Tevis
- Lowell Tew

== Th ==
- Al Thacker
- Corky Tharp
- Richard Tharp
- Larry Tharpe
- Galand Thaxton
- Jim Thaxton
- Harry Thayer
- Tom Thayer
- Joe Theismann
- Ryan Thelwell
- Harry Theofiledes
- Robenson Therezie
- John Theus
- Jim Thibaut
- Jim Thibert
- Kayvon Thibodeaux
- Keith Thibodeaux
- Dutch Thiele
- R. C. Thielemann
- Adam Thielen
- Karl Thielscher
- John Thierry
- Marcus Thigpen
- Tyler Thigpen
- Yancey Thigpen
- Aaron Thomas
- Adalius Thomas
- Ahmad Thomas
- A. J. Thomas
- Ambry Thomas
- Andre Thomas
- Andrew Thomas
- Anthony Thomas
- Azareye'h Thomas
- Ben Thomas
- Bill Thomas
- Blair Thomas
- Bob Thomas (born 1948)
- Bob Thomas (born 1952)
- Brayden Thomas
- Brian Thomas
- Broderick Thomas
- Bryan Thomas
- Cal Thomas
- Calvin Thomas
- Cam Thomas
- Cameron Thomas
- Carl Thomas
- Carlton Thomas
- Chad Thomas
- Charlie Thomas (born 1948)
- Charlie Thomas (born 2000)
- Chase Thomas
- Chris Thomas
- Chuck Thomas
- Clendon Thomas
- Corey Thomas
- Cornell Thomas
- Curtland Thomas
- Dallas Thomas
- Damon Thomas
- Daniel Thomas (born 1987)
- Daniel Thomas (born 1998)
- Dave Thomas
- David Thomas
- De'Anthony Thomas
- Dee Thomas
- Demaryius Thomas
- Derrick Thomas (born 1965)
- Derrick Thomas (born 1967)
- Devin Thomas
- Donald Thomas
- Donnie Thomas
- Dontarrious Thomas
- Doug Thomas
- Drake Thomas
- Duane Thomas
- Dymonte Thomas
- Earl Thomas (born 1948)
- Earl Thomas (born 1989)
- Earlie Thomas
- Ed Thomas
- Edward Thomas
- Emmitt Thomas
- Enid Thomas
- Eric Thomas
- Evan Thomas
- Fred Thomas
- Garth Thomas
- Gene Thomas
- George Thomas (born 1928)
- George Thomas (born 1964)
- Henry Thomas (born 1964)
- Henry Thomas (born 1965)
- Hollis Thomas
- Ian Thomas
- Ike Thomas
- Isaiah Thomas
- J. T. Thomas (born 1951)
- J. T. Thomas (born 1971)
- J. T. Thomas (born 1988)
- Jaimie Thomas
- Jason Thomas
- Jaylon Thomas
- Jemea Thomas
- Jesse Thomas
- Jewerl Thomas
- Jim Thomas
- Jimmy Thomas
- Joe Thomas (born 1963)
- Joe Thomas (born 1984)
- Joe Thomas (born 1991)
- Joey Thomas
- John Thomas (born 1900)
- John Thomas (born 1935)
- John Thomas (born 1964)
- Johnny Thomas
- Jordan Thomas
- Josh Thomas (born 1981)
- Josh Thomas (born 1989)
- Josh Thomas (born 1996)
- Juanyeh Thomas
- Julius Thomas
- Keir Thomas
- Kelly Thomas
- Ken Thomas
- Kevin Thomas (born 1964)
- Kevin Thomas (born 1978)
- Kevin Thomas (born 1986)
- Kiondre Thomas
- Kiwaukee Thomas
- Lamaar Thomas
- Lamar Thomas
- Lavale Thomas
- Lawrence Thomas
- Lee Thomas
- Logan Thomas
- Lynn Thomas
- Marcus Thomas (born 1984)
- Marcus Thomas (born 1985)
- Mark Thomas (born 1976)
- Mark Thomas (born 1969)
- Marvin Thomas
- Matthew Thomas
- Michael Thomas (born 1989)
- Michael Thomas (born 1993)
- Mike Thomas (born 1953)
- Mike Thomas (born 1987)
- Mike Thomas (born 1994)
- Nate Thomas
- Norris Thomas
- Orlando Thomas
- Pat Thomas (born 1954)
- Pat Thomas (born 1983)
- Phillip Thomas
- Pierre Thomas
- Ralph Thomas
- Randy Thomas
- Ratcliff Thomas
- Rex Thomas
- Ricky Thomas
- Robb Thomas
- Robert Thomas (born 1974)
- Robert Thomas (born 1980)
- Robert Thomas (born 1991)
- Roc Thomas
- Rodell Thomas
- Rodney Thomas (born 1965)
- Rodney Thomas (born 1973)
- Rodney Thomas II
- Russ Thomas
- Santonio Thomas
- Sean Thomas
- Shamarko Thomas
- Simeon Thomas
- Skip Thomas
- Sloan Thomas
- Solomon Thomas
- Speedy Thomas
- Spencer Thomas
- Stan Thomas
- Starling Thomas
- Tavierre Thomas
- Terrell Thomas
- Thurman Thomas
- Todd Thomas
- Tra Thomas
- Tre Thomas
- Trevian Thomas
- Vern Thomas
- Whitey Thomas
- William Thomas
- Xavier Thomas
- Zach Thomas (born 1960)
- Zach Thomas (born 1973)
- Zachary Thomas
- Rich Thomaselli
- Stantley Thomas-Oliver
- Bobby Thomason
- Jeff Thomason
- Jim Thomason
- Stumpy Thomason
- Leon Thomasson
- Chris Thome
- Deven Thompkins
- Kenbrell Thompkins
- Alvie Thompson
- Anthony Thompson (born April 8, 1967)
- Anthony Thompson (born June 19, 1967)
- Arland Thompson
- Aundra Thompson
- Bennie Thompson
- Bill Thompson (born 1906)
- Bill Thompson (born 1946)
- B. J. Thompson
- Bob Thompson
- Bobby Thompson (born 1939)
- Bobby Thompson (born 1947)
- Brandon Thompson
- Brandyn Thompson
- Broderick Thompson
- Bryce Thompson
- Carlos Thompson
- Chaun Thompson
- Chris Thompson (born 1982)
- Chris Thompson (born 1990)
- Chris Thompson (born 1994)
- Christian Thompson
- Cody Thompson
- Colin Thompson
- Corey Thompson
- Craig Thompson
- Darian Thompson
- Darrell Thompson
- Darwin Thompson
- Dave Thompson (born 1897)
- Dave Thompson (born 1949)
- David Thompson
- Deionte Thompson
- Del Thompson
- Deonte Thompson
- Derrius Thompson
- Dominique Thompson
- Don Thompson (born 1902)
- Don Thompson (born 1939)
- Donnel Thompson
- Donnell Thompson
- Emmuel Thompson
- Ernie Thompson
- Gary Thompson
- George Thompson
- Hal Thompson
- Harry Thompson
- Jack Thompson
- Jalen Thompson
- James Thompson
- Jamie Thompson
- Jeremy Thompson
- Jesse Thompson
- Jim Thompson
- John Thompson (born 1957)
- Johnny Thompson
- Jordan Thompson
- Josh Thompson
- Juwan Thompson
- Ken Thompson
- Kevin Thompson
- Lamont Thompson
- Leonard Thompson
- Leroy Thompson
- Marty Thompson
- Michael Thompson
- Mike Thompson
- Mykkele Thompson
- NaJee Thompson
- Norm Thompson
- Peyton Thompson
- Pinky Thompson
- Raynoch Thompson
- Reyna Thompson
- Ricky Thompson
- Robert Thompson
- Rocky Thompson
- Russ Thompson
- SaRodorick Thompson
- Shaq Thompson
- Skylar Thompson
- Steve Thompson (born 1945)
- Steve Thompson (born 1965)
- Syd'Quan Thompson
- Taylor Thompson
- Ted Thompson
- Tedric Thompson
- Tiny Thompson
- Tom Thompson
- Tommy Thompson (born 1918)
- Tommy Thompson (born 1927)
- Tommy Thompson (born 1972)
- Trenton Thompson
- Tuffy Thompson
- Tyson Thompson
- Vince Thompson
- Warren Thompson
- Weegie Thompson
- Woody Thompson
- Dorian Thompson-Robinson
- Art Thoms
- Fred Thomsen
- Andy Thorn
- Bob Thornbladh
- Jeremy Thornburg
- Josh Thornhill
- Juan Thornhill
- Tiny Thornhill
- Bill Thornton
- Bruce Thornton (born 1958)
- Bruce Thornton (born 1980)
- Bubba Thornton
- Cedric Thornton
- Corey Thornton
- David Thornton
- Dick Thornton
- Dont'e Thornton
- George Thornton
- Hugh Thornton
- Jack Thornton
- James Thornton
- John Thornton (born 1969)
- John Thornton (born 1976)
- Kalen Thornton
- Khyri Thornton
- Reggie Thornton
- Rupe Thornton
- Sidney Thornton
- Tyquan Thornton
- Don Thorp
- Craphonso Thorpe
- Jack Thorpe
- Jim Thorpe
- Neiko Thorpe
- Wilfred Thorpe
- Jamari Thrash
- James Thrash
- Bruce Threadgill
- Jabbar Threats
- Cliff Thrift
- Calvin Throckmorton
- Jim Thrower
- Willie Thrower
- Owen Thuerk
- Baptiste Thunder
- Joe Thuney
- Bob Thurbon
- Brian Thure
- Steve Thurlow
- Andrae Thurman
- Dennis Thurman
- John Thurman
- Junior Thurman
- Nick Thurman
- Odell Thurman
- Walter Thurmond
- Fuzzy Thurston
- Byron Thweatt

== Ti–Tj ==
- D. J. Tialavea
- John Tice
- Mike Tice
- Glenn Tidd
- Sam Tidmore
- Billy Tidwell
- Travis Tidwell
- Festus Tierney
- Leo Tierney
- Van Tiffin
- Mark Tigges
- Calvin Tiggle
- Mike Tilleman
- Andrew Tiller
- Jim Tiller
- Morgan Tiller
- Jerry Tillery
- Emmett Tilley
- Pat Tilley
- Ed Tillison
- Andre Tillman
- Cedric Tillman (born 1970)
- Cedric Tillman (born 2000)
- Charles Tillman
- Dondrea Tillman
- Faddie Tillman
- Lawyer Tillman
- Lewis Tillman
- Pat Tillman
- Pete Tillman
- Rusty Tillman
- Spencer Tillman
- Travares Tillman
- Tony Tillmon
- Ron Tilton
- Bob Timberlake
- George Timberlake
- Ken Times
- Kirk Timmer
- Adam Timmerman
- Charlie Timmons
- Lawrence Timmons
- Michael Timpson
- John Timu
- Tim Tindale
- Channing Tindall
- Tiney
- Mick Tingelhoff
- Carson Tinker
- Gerald Tinker
- Pisa Tinoisamoa
- Buddy Tinsley
- Gaynell Tinsley
- Jess Tinsley
- Keith Tinsley
- Mitchell Tinsley
- Pete Tinsley
- Scott Tinsley
- Sid Tinsley
- Andre Tippett
- Kenny Tippins
- Joe Tippmann
- Dave Tipton
- David Tipton
- Howie Tipton
- Mason Tipton
- Rico Tipton
- Zurlon Tipton
- Bob Titchenal
- Glen Titensor
- Herb Titmas
- Y. A. Tittle
- George Titus
- Si Titus
- Casey Tiumalu

== To ==
- Robbie Tobeck
- Dave Tobey
- Bill Tobin
- Elgie Tobin
- George Tobin
- Leo Tobin
- Matt Tobin
- Rex Tobin
- Steve Tobin
- Nelson Toburen
- Dick Todd
- Jim Todd
- Joe Todd
- Larry Todd
- Richard Todd
- Jordan Todman
- Matt Toeaina
- LaBrandon Toefield
- Jeff Toews
- Loren Toews
- Joe Tofflemire
- Joe Tofil
- Pago Togafau
- Noah Togiai
- Tommy Togiai
- Jay Toia
- Brendan Toibin
- Levine Toilolo
- Charlie Tolar
- Jalen Tolbert
- Jim Tolbert
- Mike Tolbert
- Tony Tolbert
- Gregory Toler
- Ken Toler
- Alvin Toles
- Kevin Toliver
- Stuart Tolle
- Chuck Tollefson
- Dave Tollefson
- Tommy Tolleson
- Ed Tolley
- Billy Joe Tolliver
- Jalen Tolliver
- Scott Tolzien
- Cameron Tom
- Mel Tom
- Army Tomaini
- Johnny Tomaini
- Carl Tomasello
- Lou Tomasetti
- Andy Tomasic
- Pat Tomberlin
- Mike Tomczak
- Jared Tomich
- Tommy Tomlin
- Dalvin Tomlinson
- Dick Tomlinson
- Eric Tomlinson
- LaDainian Tomlinson
- Laken Tomlinson
- Tre'Vius Tomlinson
- Clarence Tommerson
- Bob Toneff
- Mario Tonelli
- Tony Tonelli
- Cole Toner
- Ed Toner (born 1944)
- Ed Toner (born 1968)
- Tom Toner
- Anthony Toney
- Kadarius Toney
- Shaka Toney
- Khyiris Tonga
- Manase Tonga
- Jake Tonges
- Marco Tongue
- Reggie Tongue
- Clayton Tonnemaker
- Robert Tonyan
- Charlie Toogood
- Casey Toohill
- Pat Toomay
- Amani Toomer
- Korey Toomer
- Al Toon
- Nick Toon
- Spencer Toone
- Chief Toorock
- Jeff Tootle
- Henry To'oTo'o
- Ted Topor
- Bob Topp
- Ryan Torain
- Stacey Toran
- Reggie Torbor
- LaVerne Torczon
- LaVern Torgeson
- Anthony Toribio
- Eric Torkelson
- Jack Torrance
- Leigh Torrence
- O'Cyrus Torrence
- Gino Torretta
- Bob Torrey
- Bud Toscani
- Flavio Tosi
- John Tosi
- Mao Tosi
- Keith Toston
- Brett Toth
- Jon Toth
- Tom Toth
- Zollie Toth
- Erik Totten
- Willie Totten
- Michael Toudouze
- Samori Toure
- Darrel Toussaint
- Fitzgerald Toussaint
- Steve Tovar
- Steve Towle
- Thurston Towle
- Dan Towler
- Willie Townes
- Bobby Towns
- Lester Towns
- Morris Towns
- Derrick Townsel
- Jo-Jo Townsell
- Andre Townsend
- Brian Townsend
- Curtis Townsend
- Deshea Townsend
- Greg Townsend
- Johnny Townsend
- Otto Townsend
- Tommy Townsend

== Tr–Ts ==
- John Tracey
- Adrian Tracy
- Tom Tracy
- Tyrone Tracy Jr.
- Dante Trader Jr.
- Rod Trafford
- George Trafton
- John Trahan
- Patrick Trahan
- Lynden Trail
- Mike Trainor
- Allen Trammel
- Austin Trammell
- Drue Tranquill
- Badara Traore
- Ozzy Trapilo
- Steve Trapilo
- James Trapp
- Richard Trapp
- Kyle Trask
- Orville Trask
- Justin Trattou
- Adam Trautman
- Phil Trautwein
- Herb Travenio
- Brick Travis
- Jalen Travis
- John Travis
- Mack Travis
- Ross Travis
- Brynden Trawick
- Austin Traylor
- Keith Traylor
- Jerry Traynham
- Wade Traynham
- Barney Traynor
- Mark Traynowicz
- John Treadaway
- David Treadwell
- Laquon Treadwell
- Ahmad Treaudo
- Buzz Trebotich
- Brian Treggs
- Bryce Treggs
- Stephen Trejo
- Brycen Tremayne
- Greg Tremble
- Tommy Tremble
- Morgan Trent
- Sebastian Tretola
- J. C. Tretter
- Adam Treu
- Danny Trevathan
- Cory Trice
- Frank Trigilio
- Jack Triggs
- Steve Trimble
- Wayne Trimble
- Zach Triner
- Bill Triplett
- Mel Triplett
- Nate Triplett
- Wallace Triplett
- Paul Tripoli
- Jordan Tripp
- Kiante Tripp
- Charley Trippi
- Larry Tripplett
- John Tripson
- Frank Tripucka
- Rick Trocano
- Bob Trocolor
- Gene Trosch
- Milt Trost
- Jeremiah Trotter
- Jeremiah Trotter Jr.
- Bill Troup
- Torell Troup
- Ben Troupe
- David Trout
- Johnnie Troutman
- Ray Trowbridge
- Billy Truax
- Dalton Truax
- Mitch Trubisky
- Jack Trudeau
- Jeremy Trueblood
- Hal Truesdell
- Desmond Trufant
- Isaiah Trufant
- Marcus Trufant
- Dave Truitt
- Greg Truitt
- Olanda Truitt
- Don Trull
- R-Kal Truluck
- Bob Trumpy
- Jason Trusnik
- Xavier Truss
- Eric Truvillion
- Eddie Tryon
- Justin Tryon
- Joe Tryon-Shoyinka
- Chalmers Tschappat
- Lou Tsoutsouvas
- Sam Tsoutsouvas

== Tu–Ty ==
- Esera Tuaolo
- Natu Tuatagaloa
- Jerry Tubbs
- Marcus Tubbs
- Winfred Tubbs
- Justin Tuck
- B. J. Tucker
- Bill Tucker
- Bob Tucker
- Casey Tucker
- Dalton Tucker
- Erroll Tucker
- Gary Tucker
- Jason Tucker
- Justin Tucker
- Jyles Tucker
- Mark Tucker
- Matthew Tucker
- Rex Tucker
- Ross Tucker
- Ryan Tucker
- Sean Tucker
- Torrin Tucker
- Travis Tucker
- Tre Tucker
- Verran Tucker
- Wendell Tucker
- Phil Tuckett
- Dick Tuckey
- Jeff Tuel
- Max Tuerk
- Jay Tufele
- Sean Tufts
- Anthony Tuggle
- Jessie Tuggle
- John Tuggle
- Justin Tuggle
- Manu Tuiasosopo
- Marques Tuiasosopo
- Navy Tuiasosopo
- JT Tuimoloau
- Mark Tuinei
- Tom Tuinei
- Van Tuinei
- Jacob Tuioti-Mariner
- Joe Tuipala
- Marlon Tuipulotu
- Peter Tuipulotu
- Tuli Tuipulotu
- Maugaula Tuitele
- Stephon Tuitt
- Will Tukuafu
- Walter Tullis
- Willie Tullis
- Stephen Tulloch
- Darrell Tully
- George Tully
- Jerame Tuman
- Tom Tumulty
- Clayton Tune
- Emlen Tunnell
- Laremy Tunsil
- Tom Tupa
- Christian Tupou
- Josh Tupou
- Tani Tupou
- Jeff Tupper
- Kemoko Turay
- Frank Turbert
- Robert Turbin
- Woodny Turenne
- Dan Turk
- Godwin Turk
- Matt Turk
- Doug Turley
- John Turley
- Kyle Turley
- Guy Turnbow
- Jesse Turnbow
- Nick Turnbull
- Renaldo Turnbull
- Bake Turner
- Barry Turner
- Bill Turner
- Billy Turner
- Buff Turner
- Bulldog Turner
- Calvin Turner
- Cecil Turner
- Clem Turner
- Cole Turner
- Dallas Turner
- Daryl Turner
- Deacon Turner
- De'Lance Turner
- D. J. Turner (born 1997)
- D. J. Turner (born 2000)
- Dwaine Turner
- Eric Turner
- Floyd Turner
- Hal Turner
- Herschel Turner
- J. T. Turner
- Jay Turner
- Jim Turner (born 1897)
- Jim Turner (born 1912)
- Jim Turner (born 1941)
- Jimmie Turner
- Jimmy Turner
- John Turner
- Jordan Turner
- Keena Turner
- Kevin Turner (born 1958)
- Kevin Turner (born 1969)
- Kobie Turner
- Landon Turner
- Larry Turner
- Malik Turner
- Marcus Turner
- Maurice Turner
- Michael Turner
- Mike Turner
- Nate Turner (born 1969)
- Nate Turner (born 1978)
- Nolan Turner
- Odessa Turner
- Patrick Turner
- Paul Turner
- Payton Turner
- Richard Turner
- Ricky Turner
- Rob Turner
- Robert Turner
- Rocky Turner
- Sam Turner
- Scott Turner
- Shemar Turner
- T. J. Turner (born 1963)
- T. J. Turner (born 1978)
- Tiny Turner
- Trai Turner
- Vernon Turner
- Vince Turner
- Wylie Turner
- Zeke Turner
- Delarrin Turner-Yell
- Tom Turnure
- KaVontae Turpin
- Miles Turpin
- Willie Turral
- Andrew Turzilli
- Derrek Tuszka
- Bhayshul Tuten
- Melvin Tuten
- Rick Tuten
- James Tuthill
- Tom Tutson
- Stacy Tutt
- George Tuttle
- Orville Tuttle
- Perry Tuttle
- Shy Tuttle
- Frank Twedell
- Rodney Tweet
- Howard Twilley
- Darren Twombly
- Gunnard Twyner
- Will Tye
- Andre Tyler
- Maurice Tyler
- Pete Tyler
- Robert Tyler
- Tank Tyler
- Toussaint Tyler
- Wendell Tyler
- Rich Tylski
- Brian Tyms
- Scott Tyner
- Buddy Tynes
- Lawrence Tynes
- David Tyree
- Jim Tyree
- Jim Tyrer
- Joe Tyrrell
- Tim Tyrrell
- Deangelo Tyson
- Dick Tyson
- Mike Tyson
