= 1920 Dayton Triangles season =

Sports season

- Owner: Carl Storck
- Head coach: Bud Talbott
- Home stadium: Triangle Park

Results
- Record: 5–2–2 Overall; 4–2–2 APFA
- League place: 6th APFA

The 1920 Dayton Triangles season was the franchise's inaugural season in the American Professional Football Association (AFPA)—later named the National Football League. The Triangles entered the season coming off a 5–2–1 record in 1919 in the Ohio League. After the 1919 season, several representatives from the Ohio League wanted to form a new professional league; thus, the APFA was created. A majority of the team stayed from the 1919 team, including the coaching staff, while two players left the team.

The Triangles opened the season with a win against the Columbus Panhandles. This game is considered the first league game where two APFA teams played against each other. After a six-game winning streak, the Triangles faced their first loss of the season to the future champions, the Akron Pros. This team would give the Triangles their only two losses of the year. The Triangles finished the season with a 5–2–2 record, which earned them sixth place in the APFA standings. No players were awarded with the first team All-Pro award, Norb Sacksteder made the second team, and Frank Bacon made the third team.

== Offseason ==
The Dayton Triangles finished 5–2–1 in their 1919 season in the Ohio League. The Triangles had several players added to their team for the 1920 season: Max Broadhurst, Doc Davis, Guy Early, Russ Hathaway, Chuck Helvie, Pesty Lentz, Norb Sacksteder, Ed Sauer, Fritz Slackford, and Tiny Turner. Two players—one with a last name Albers, and one with a last name Yerges—did not play for the Triangles in 1920, and the coaching staff stayed the same.

After the 1919 season, representatives of four Ohio League teams—the Canton Bulldogs, the Cleveland Tigers, the Dayton Triangles, and the Akron Pros—called a meeting on August 20, 1920, to discuss the formation of a new league. At the meeting, they tentatively agreed on a salary cap and pledged not to sign college players or players already under contract with other teams. They also agreed on a name for the circuit: the American Professional Football Conference. They then invited other professional teams to a second meeting on September 17.

At that meeting, held at Bulldogs owner Ralph Hay's Hupmobile showroom in Canton, representatives of the Rock Island Independents, the Muncie Flyers, the Decatur Staleys, the Racine Cardinals, the Massillon Tigers, and the Hammond Pros agreed to join the league. Representatives of the Buffalo All-Americans and Rochester Jeffersons could not attend the meeting, but sent letters to Hay asking to be included in the league. Team representatives changed the league's name slightly to the American Professional Football Association and elected officers, installing Jim Thorpe as president. Under the new league structure, teams created their schedules dynamically as the season progressed, so there were no minimum or maximum number of games needed to be played. Also, representatives of each team voted to determine the winner of the APFA trophy.

== Schedule ==
Game	Date	Opponent	Result	Record	Venue	Attendance	Recap	Sources
1	October 3	Columbus Panhandles	W 14–0	1–0	Triangle Park	"biggest crowd" for pro opener	Recap	
2	October 10	Cleveland Tigers	T 0–0	1–0–1	Triangle Park	4,000	Recap	
3	October 17	Hammond Pros	W 44–0	2–0–1	Triangle Park	2,000	Recap	
4	October 24	Canton Bulldogs	T 20–20	2–0–2	Triangle Park	5,000	Recap	
5	October 31	vs. Cincinnati Celts	W 23–7	3–0–2	Triangle Park		Recap	
—	November 7	Muncie Flyers	cancelled due to rain					
6	November 14	at Rock Island Independents	W 21–0	4–0–2	Douglas Park	2,000+	Recap	
7	November 21	at Akron Pros	L 0–13	4–1–2	League Park	3,700	Recap	
8	November 25	Detroit Heralds	W 28–0	5–1–2	Triangle Park		Recap	
9	November 28	Akron Pros	L 0–14	5–2–2	Triangle Park	5,000	Recap	
Note: Non-APFA opponents in italics. Thanksgiving Day: November 25.

== Standings ==
1920 APFA standings
	W	L	T	PCT	DIV	DPCT	PF	PA	STK
Akron Pros†	8	0	3	1.000	6–0–3	1.000	151	7	T2
Decatur Staleys	10	1	2	.909	5–1–2	.833	164	21	T1
Buffalo All-Americans	9	1	1	.900	4–1–1	.800	258	32	T1
Chicago Cardinals	6	2	2	.750	3–2–1	.600	101	29	T1
Rock Island Independents	6	2	2	.750	4–2–1	.667	201	49	W1
Dayton Triangles	5	2	2	.714	4–2–2	.667	150	54	L1
Rochester Jeffersons	6	3	2	.667	0–1–0	.000	156	57	T1
Canton Bulldogs	7	4	2	.636	4–3–1	.571	208	57	W1
Detroit Heralds	2	3	3	.400	1–3–0	.250	53	82	T2
Cleveland Tigers	2	4	2	.333	1–4–2	.200	28	46	L1
Chicago Tigers	2	5	1	.286	1–5–1	.167	49	63	W1
Hammond Pros	2	5	0	.286	0–3–0	.000	41	154	L3
Columbus Panhandles	2	6	2	.250	0–5–0	.000	41	121	W1
Muncie Flyers	0	1	0	.000	0–1–0	.000	0	45	L1

† Awarded the Brunswick-Balke Collender Cup and named APFA Champions
by vote of league owners. Staleys claimed a co-title.

== Game summaries ==
=== Game 1: vs. Columbus Panhandles ===
	1	2	3	4	Total
Panhandles	0	0	0	0	0
Triangles	0	0	7	7	14

October 3, 1920, at Triangle Park

The Triangles' opening game against the Columbus Panhandles is considered by football historians to be the first football game between two APFA teams. Since kickoff times were not standardized in 1920, it is unknown if this game or the Muncie–Rock Island game is the first game played. The Triangles won 14–0. The Triangles' defense made a goal-line stand in the second quarter while the Panhandles had the ball on the 3-yard line. Before halftime, the Triangles' back Al Mahrt completed a 30-yard pass to end Dutch Thiele to give the Triangles possession on the 5-yard line. The Triangles failed to convert, however, as time ran out. Early in the third quarter, the Triangles started a possession on their own 35-yard line. Four consecutive run plays carried them to midfield. Soon after, back Lou Partlow had a succession of runs which resulted in a touchdown. The other Triangle score came in the middle of the fourth quarter when end Frank Bacon returned a punt for a 60-yard touchdown. After both touchdowns, George Kinderdine was responsible for the extra points.

=== Game 2: vs. Cleveland Tigers ===
	1	2	3	4	Total
Tigers	0	0	0	0	0
Triangles	0	0	0	0	0

October 10, 1920, at Triangle Park

After the historic game, the Triangles played against the Cleveland Tigers. The owner of the Tigers, Jimmy O'Donnell, helped with the foundation of the APFA. No team scored, and the game ended in a 0–0 tie.

=== Game 3: vs. Hammond Pros ===
	1	2	3	4	Total
Pros	0	0	0	0	0
Triangles	7	20	3	14	44

October 17, 1920, at Triangle Park

The Hammond Pros were the Triangles' next opponent. In the first quarter, Mahrt had a one-yard rushing touchdown. The Triangles scored three touchdowns in the second quarter: a 50-yard receiving touchdown from Mahrt, a 35-yard receiving touchdown from Reese, and a rushing touchdown from Partlow. The extra point was missed after the first touchdown. In the next quarter, Roudebush kicked a 35-yard field goal. The last score of the game was a receiving touchdown from Sacksteder. The final score of the game was 44–0 before a crowd of 2,000.

=== Game 4: vs. Canton Bulldogs ===
	1	2	3	4	Total
Bulldogs	7	7	3	3	20
Triangles	0	14	6	0	20

October 24, 1920, at Triangle Park

In their fourth contest of the season, the Triangles battled the Canton Bulldogs, who had the Hall-of-Fame back Jim Thorpe. The Bulldogs opened the scoring in the first quarter on a two-yard rushing touchdown by Pete Calac. But the Triangles came back in the second quarter, scoring twice: Bacon had a four-yard rushing touchdown, and end Dave Reese had a 50-yard receiving touchdown. Guyon scored a 22-yard rushing touchdown during the second quarter, but the extra point was missed. In the third quarter, the Triangles responded with a 3-yard rushing touchdown by Partlow, but Dayton missed the extra point to make the score 20–14. Thorpe then came into the game, and kicked a 45-yard field goal to bring his team within three points. In the final minutes, Thorpe kicked another 35-yard field goal to tie it. The Triangles were the first team to score on the Bulldogs since the opening game of the previous year.

=== Game 5: vs. Cincinnati Celts ===
	1	2	3	4	Total
Celts	0	7	0	0	7
Triangles	7	9	7	0	23

October 31, 1920, at Triangle Park

The Cincinnati Celts were the next opponent for the Triangles. The Celts were not directly affiliated with the APFA and did not join the league until the following season. The lone score in the first quarter came from a fumble recovery by George Roudebush, who returned it for a touchdown. In the next quarter, Wehringer for the Celts ran an interception back for a touchdown. The Triangles scored twice in the second quarter: a rushing touchdown from Abrell and a 35-yard field goal from Roudebush. Frank Bacon had a 30-yard interception return for a touchdown in the third quarter, en route to the 23–7 victory for the Triangles.

=== Game 6: at Rock Island Independents ===
	1	2	3	4	Total
Triangles	7	0	0	14	21
Independents	0	0	0	0	0

November 14, 1920, at Douglas Park

In week eight, the Triangles played against the Rock Island Independents. The Independents had six players returning from injuries this game. In the first quarter, Rube Ursella for the Independents fumbled a punt on the 40-yard line, and the Triangles gained possession. On that possession, Bacon scored a rushing touchdown. The Independents controlled the football for a majority of the second quarter. On their final possession of the half, they traveled to the Triangles' four-inch line, but the referee signaled to end the first half. In the fourth quarter, Ed Novack and Arnold Wyman for the Independents left the game due to injury. The Triangles scored two passing touchdowns in the final 10 minutes of the game; the first was caught by Dave Reese, and the second was caught by Roudebush.

=== Game 7: at Akron Pros ===
	1	2	3	4	Total
Triangles	0	0	0	0	0
Pros	0	0	0	13	13

November 21, 1920, at League Park

In week nine, the Triangles played against the Akron Pros. The Pros came into this game as one of the few teams left in the APFA who were undefeated. The game started out with three scoreless quarters until Rip King threw a 15-yard passing touchdown in the fourth quarter to Frank McCormick. Fritz Pollard, a future Hall-of-Famer, rushed for a 17-yard touchdown, and Charlie Copley made one extra point and missed another one to beat the Triangles 13–0 and give the Triangles their first loss of the season.

=== Game 8: vs. Detroit Heralds ===
	1	2	3	4	Total
Heralds	0	0	0	0	0
Triangles	14	14	0	0	28

November 25, 1920, at Triangle Park

Coming off their first loss of the season, the Triangles played against the Detroit Heralds. Bacon contributed to every point in the first quarter; he first a 3-yard rushing touchdown, and followed up by a catching a receiving touchdown. Dick Abrell contributed in the second quarter, as he scored a rushing touchdown. Sacksteder caught a receiving touchdown from Roudebush to put the Triangles up 28–0 at halftime. The second half was scoreless, and the Triangles moved on to a 5–1–2 record with one game left in their season.

=== Game 9: vs. Akron Pros ===
	1	2	3	4	Total
Pros	0	0	7	7	14
Triangles	0	0	0	0	0

November 28, 1920, at Triangle Park

The Pros were now recognized as the top team in Ohio, and the Triangles had a rematch against the Pros. The game could have been classified as a World Championship, but the APFA had widened its battlefield with the Buffalo All-Americans and the Decatur Staleys still in contention for the APFA trophy. In front of 5,000 fans, Akron star Fritz Pollard returned a punt for a touchdown in the first quarter and had one receiving touchdown in the third quarter from King, delivering the Triangles their second loss of the year.

== Post-season ==
Hurt by losses to the Akron Pros, the Triangles did not contend for the APFA trophy in 1920. The Triangles' performance of 5–2–2 would be the team's best before being sold and relocating to Brooklyn after the 1929 season. Sportswriter Bruce Copeland compiled the 1920 All Pro team; no players made the first team, Sacksteder made the second team, and Bacon made the third team. As of 2012, no players from the 1920 Dayton Triangles were enshrined in the Pro Football Hall of Fame.

== Roster ==
Dayton Triangles 1920 roster
Dick Abrell (B); Frank Bacon (B/E); Max Broadhurst (T); Bill Clark (G/C); Harry Cutler (T); Doc Davis (G/T); Larry Dellinger (G/T); Guy Earley (G/B); Lee Fenner (E/B)	Russ Hathaway (T/G); Earl Hauser (E/T); Chuck Helvie (E); Hobby Kinderdine (C); Pesty Lentz (B); Al Mahrt (B); Lou Partlow (B); Dave Reese (E); George Roudebush (B)	Norb Sacksteder (T/B); Eddie Sauer (T/G); Fritz Slackford (B/E); Earl Stoecklein (G); Dutch Thiele (E); Glenn Tidd (C/G); Nelson Talbot (Coach); Tiny Turner (G); Charlie Winston (G)
