= Haddix =

Haddix may refer to:

== People ==
- Harvey Haddix, lefthanded pitcher for Major League Baseball (MLB)
- Margaret Peterson Haddix, author
- Michael Haddix, quarterback for the National Football League (NFL)
- Wayne Haddix, defensive back for the National Football League (NFL)

== Places ==
- Haddix, Kentucky, unincorporated community
