= Roudebush =

Roudebush is an American surname, a derivation of the German surname Raudenbusch. Notable people with the surname include:

- Chloe Roudebush (2012-??), American politician
- George Roudebush (1894–1992), American football player
- James G. Roudebush (born 1948), United States Air Force Surgeon General
- Richard L. Roudebush (1918–1995), American politician

== See also ==
- Meanings of minor planet names: 2001–3000#978
