= Antonio Dixon (American football) =

American football player (born 1985)

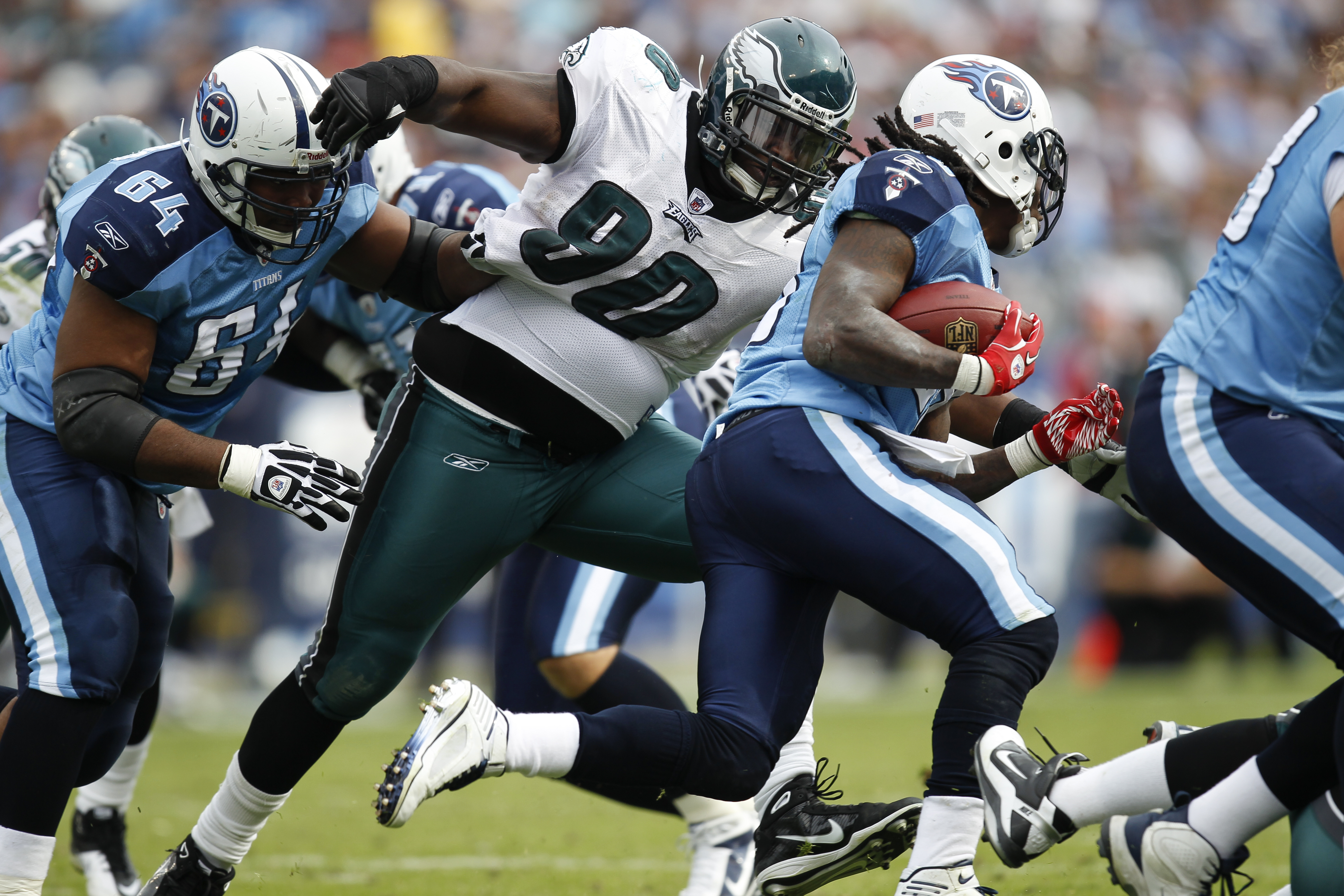
- Dixon (No. 90), while with the Eagles, trying to tackle Tennessee Titans running back Chris Johnson, while evading a block from Leroy Harris, in October 2010.

No. 64, 90, 97
- Position: Nose tackle

Personal information
- Born: July 17, 1985 (age 41); Miami, Florida, U.S.
- Listed height: 6 ft 2 in (1.88 m)
- Listed weight: 325 lb (147 kg)

Career information
- High school: Booker T. Washington (Miami)
- College: Miami (FL)
- NFL draft: 2009: undrafted

Career history
- Washington Redskins (2009)*; Philadelphia Eagles (2009–2011); Indianapolis Colts (2012); Philadelphia Eagles (2012); West Texas Wildcatters (2014); New Orleans VooDoo (2015)*
- * Offseason or practice squad member only

Awards and highlights
- Wilma Rudolph Student Athlete Achievement Award (2009)

Career NFL statistics
- Total tackles: 56
- Sacks: 3
- Stats at Pro Football Reference

Antonio Dixon (born July 17, 1985) is an American former professional football player who was a nose tackle for the Philadelphia Eagles and Indianapolis Colts of the National Football League (NFL). He was signed as an undrafted free agent by the Washington Redskins in 2009. He played college football for the Miami Hurricanes.

== Early life ==
Dixon grew up in at least six homeless shelters in Miami and Atlanta. He stuttered, had dyslexia, and could not read until the sixth grade. His mother, Corenthia Dixon, was a single parent raising five children, including Dixon. His father, Frazier Hawkins, served 17 years in prison for drug trafficking charges. He was released in April 2009 and now works as a personal trainer in a health club. Corenthia Dixon used drugs for two years, which led to Dixon and his siblings to live in foster care for a year. When Dixon was in the eighth grade, his family moved into an apartment. He got into fights as a child, got suspended, and eventually expelled from school while in eighth grade. Corenthia is now a cafeteria worker at a homeless shelter in Miami.

Dixon attended Booker T. Washington High School in Miami, Florida. He started playing football in the ninth grade, and he played as an offensive and defensive lineman. He graded out at better than 90 percent in his blocking assignments as a senior. On defense, Dixon had 62 tackles and 10.5 sacks in his senior year, with 8.0 sacks during his junior year. He was ranked the 19th player in Florida by Rivals.com and was the 7th prep school prospect. By the time he finished high school, he weighed over 350 pounds.

In his only year at Milford Academy in 2004, Dixon finished with 77 tackles, including 21 tackles for loss, which was a team-high. He also had 11.5 sacks, which was tied for first on the team, as Milford finished 11-1 that season. He had to take a Greyhound bus back and forth from New York to Miami because he could not afford plane tickets.

== College career ==
Dixon chose to sign with the University of Miami to play college football over Florida, Florida State, Rutgers and South Florida. As a true freshman in 2005, he played in eight games and had seven tackles in key goal-line and short-yardage situations. In his sophomore season in 2006, he played in 10 games (one start) and made 12 tackles, including two tackles for loss and a sack. As a junior in 2007, Dixon played in nine games with four starts and made 21 tackles, 3.5 tackles for loss, 1.5 sacks and a pass deflection. In his senior year in 2008, he played in 13 games with five starts and made 31 tackles, three tackles for loss, and one fumble recovery.

In August 2008, Dixon was hospitalized due to the effects of heat in Miami.

In his career at the University of Miami, Dixon made 71 tackles, 8.5 tackles for loss, 2.5 sacks, a fumble recovery and a pass deflection. He also played in 40 games, ten of which he started.

During spring of 2009, Dixon received the Wilma Rudolph Student Athlete Achievement Award along with five other college athletes. The award is given to college athletes who have overcome great personal, academic and emotional odds to achieve academic success.

Dixon graduated with a degree in liberal arts in May 2009, and became the first person in his family to graduate college.

== Professional career ==
=== Washington Redskins ===
After being undrafted in the 2009 NFL draft, Dixon was signed by the Washington Redskins. He was waived on September 5, 2009.

=== Philadelphia Eagles (first stint) ===
Dixon was claimed off waivers by the Philadelphia Eagles on September 6, 2009. Against the Chicago Bears on November 22, 2009, Dixon blocked a crucial field goal by Bears kicker Robbie Gould, which led to a 24-20 victory for the Eagles. After tearing his triceps in a week four game against the San Francisco 49ers on October 2, 2011, Dixon was placed on season-ending injured reserve. He was re-signed to a one-year restricted free agent tender on March 14, 2012. He was waived by Philadelphia on August 31, 2012 during final roster cuts.

=== Indianapolis Colts ===
Dixon was signed when cornerback Justin King was waived to bolster depleted defensive line.

=== Philadelphia Eagles (second stint) ===
Dixon was re-signed to a two-year deal by the Eagles on December 26, 2012. He was released on August 30, 2013.

=== West Texas Wildcatters ===
In 2014, Dixon signed with the West Texas Wildcatters of the Lone Star Football League (LSFL).

=== New Orleans VooDoo ===
On October 29, 2014, Dixon was assigned to the New Orleans VooDoo of the Arena Football League (AFL). He was placed on reassignment on February 20, 2015.

== Personal life ==
Dixon has an older half-brother, Darrell, a younger brother, Jarvis, and a younger sister, Mikesha.
