= Mel Doherty =

American football player and coach (1894–1942)

Profile
- Positions: Center, Head coach

Personal information
- Born: April 21, 1894; Cincinnati, Ohio, U.S.
- Died: May 7, 1942 (aged 48)
- Listed height: 5 ft 11 in (1.80 m)
- Listed weight: 190 lb (86 kg)

Career information
- College: Marietta

Career history

Playing
- 1910–1923: Cincinnati Celts

Coaching
- 1910−1923: Cincinnati Celts
- Coaching profile at Pro Football Reference

John L. (Mel) Doherty (April 21, 1894 − May 7, 1942) was a professional American football player-coach with the Cincinnati Celts of the "Ohio League" and its direct descendant, the American Professional Football Association (renamed the National Football League in 1922). Doherty coached the Celts throughout their entire existence from 1910 to 1923. The team played only four games in the AFPA, posting a 1–3 record. However prior to joining the league, the Celts flourished in the Ohio League.

Doherty also played football at the Great Lakes Naval Training Station during World War I, and later served as an assistant coach at Xavier University. He was also a popular bandleader in the Cincinnati area, during the 1920s, and later became a salesman for the Hudepohl Brewing Company.

His son Jerry later became the dance partner to Doris Mary Ann Kappelhoff, who is better known to audiences as actress Doris Day.
