= Harry Cutler =

American football player (1893–1964)

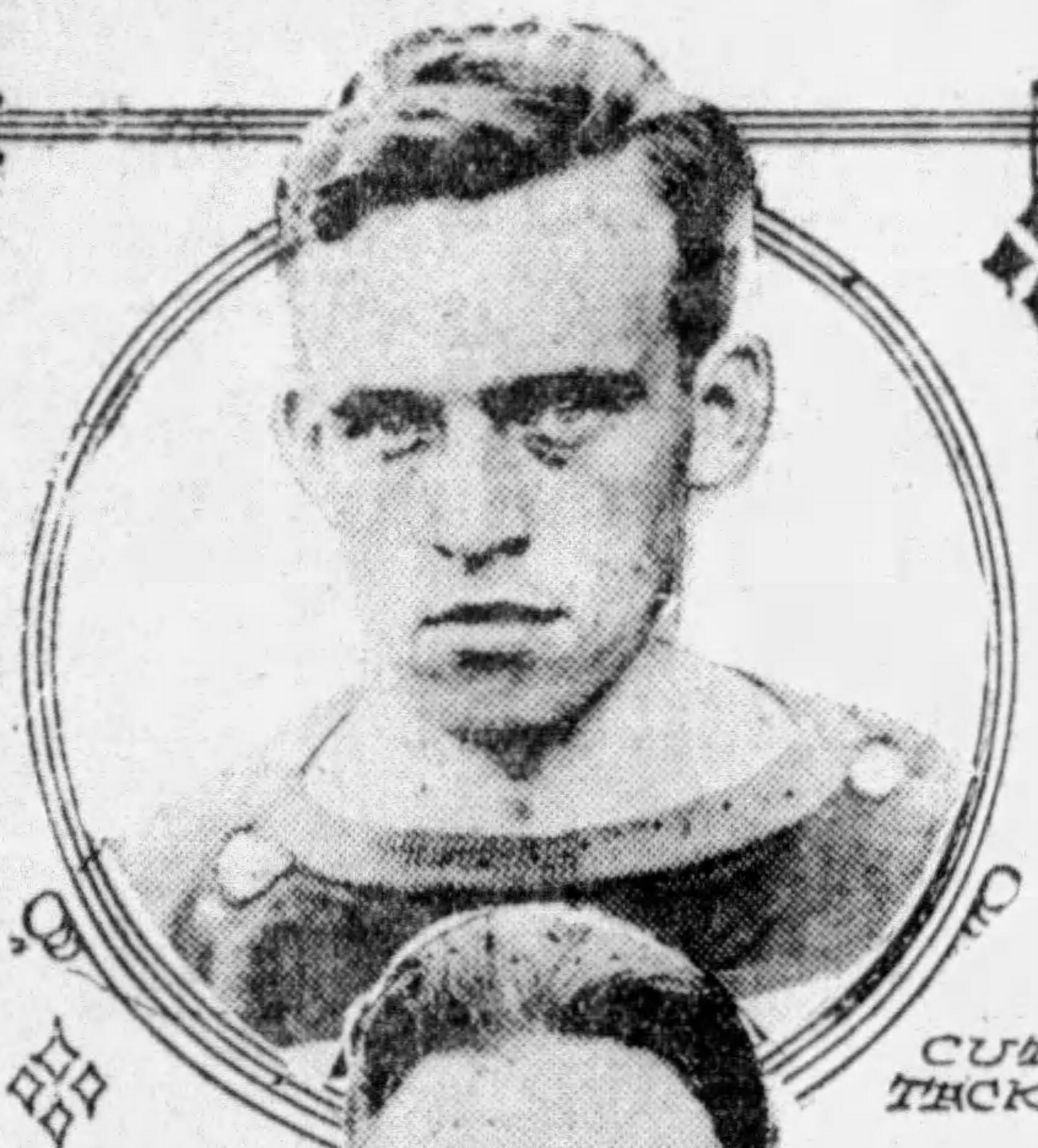
- Harry Cutler, 1916

Profile
- Position: Tackle

Personal information
- Born: September 13, 1893; Philadelphia, Pennsylvania, U.S.
- Died: April 24, 1964 (aged 70); Dayton, Ohio, U.S.
- Listed height: 6 ft 2 in (1.88 m)
- Listed weight: 190 lb (86 kg)

Career information
- College: Penn State, Ohio State

Career history
- Dayton Triangles (1916–1920)

Harry George "King" Cutler Jr. (September 13, 1893 – April 24, 1964) was an American football player and official as well as a businessman and civil leader in Dayton, Ohio. He played professional football, principally as a tackle, for the Dayton Triangles from 1916 to 1920. He was Dayton's starting left tackle in the first NFL game on October 3, 1920. After his football career, he was in the insurance business in Dayton from 1925 until his retirement in 1963.

== Early life ==
Cutler was born in 1893 in Philadelphia.

There is uncertainty in the source materials as to whether Cutler played college football. Some accounts indicate that he played college football for Penn State and Ohio State. However, after a 1917 interview, the Dayton Daily News reported: "'King' Cutler doesn't want to tell where he got his early football training for he declares he never had a whole lot." Another source asserts that he attended both Penn State and Ohio State where he "was interested in athletics", but makes no mention of his playing for either school's football team.

== Dayton Triangles ==
In 1916, he moved to Dayton, Ohio, to work for the Dayton Metal Products Company. That fall, he joined the Dayton Triangles, one of the pioneering teams in professional football. He remained with the Triangles for five seasons through 1920. In late October 1916, The Dayton Herald called him "one of the best men on the team." After his second season with the team, the Dayton Daily News wrote that "for two successive seasons he has played a whale of a game at right tackle."

When the NFL was formed in 1920, the Triangles were one of the original participants. On October 3, 1920, the Triangles defeated the Columbus Panhandles, 14–0, in the first official NFL game. Cutler was the Triangles' starting left tackle in the NFL's inaugural game.

Database sources indicate that Cutler appeared in seven games, four as a starter, during Dayton's 1920 season. However, contemporaneous newspaper accounts show that he appeared in eight NFL games in 1920, three of them as Dayton's starting left tackle:

October 3: starting left tackle against Columbus;
October 10: starting left tackle against Cleveland;
October 17: substitute at right tackle against Hammond;
October 24: starting left tackle against Canton;
October 31: substitute at left tackle against Cincinnati;
November 14: did not play at Rock Island;
November 21: substitute at left tackle against Akron;
November 25: substitute at right tackle against Detroit; and
November 28: substitute at left tackle against Akron.

Cutler retired as a player after the 1920 season and became the Triangles' timekeeper in 1921.

== Later life ==
After his professional football career, Cutler continued to reside in Dayton. He officiated high school and college football games in Dayton in the 1920s and 1930s. In 1935, he was chosen as the president of the Ohio Officials Association. He was also the athletic director at Dayton Junior and Senior High Schools in the late 1920s. He was also the president of the Dayton Aviators baseball club.

He worked in the insurance business in Dayton for almost 40 years starting in 1925. He was elected president of the Dayton Life Underwriters in 1932. He also served in the 1930s as the president of the Dayton chapter of the American Business Club. In 1943, he formed his own company, the Harry G. Cutler Co. During World War II, he was chairman of the Dayton Council for Defense. He also became a leader in civic affairs in Dayton, serving in organizations including the Chamber of Commerce and Salvation Army. Cutler retired in 1963 and died in 1964 at age 70 in Dayton.
