= Earl Hauser =

American football player

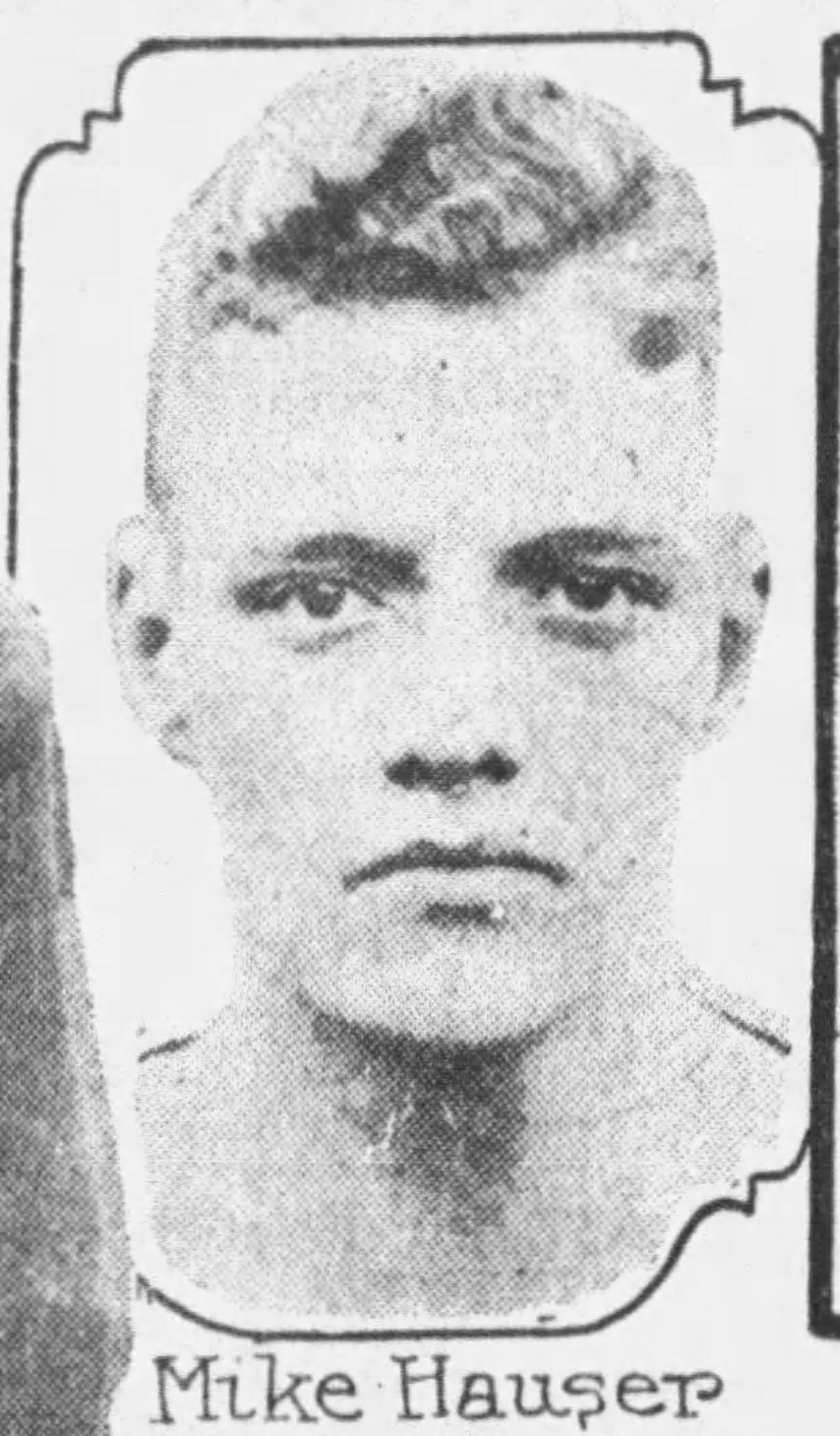
- The Dayton Evening Herald, October 13, 1920

Profile
- Positions: Tackle, guard, end

Personal information
- Born: 1896
- Listed height: 6 ft 1 in (1.85 m)
- Listed weight: 191 lb (87 kg)

Career information
- High school: Covington (KY)
- College: Miami (OH)

Career history
- Dayton Triangles (1919–1920); Cincinnati Celts (1921)

William Earl Hauser (born 1896), also known as Mike Hauser, sometimes known as "Yellow" Hauser, was an American football player.

== Life ==
Hauser was born in approximately 1896 in Illinois. He attended high school in Covington, Kentucky, and played college football at Miami (OH). He was voted the best looking man on the Miami campus in 1920. He also served as an assistant on the Miami (OH) coaching staff in 1919 and 1920. The school's 1920 yearbook credited "Yellow" Hauser for his work in assisting the coaching staff of the 1919 team.

== Career ==
Hauser played professional football for the Dayton Triangles from 1919 to 1920 and for the Cincinnati Celts in 1921. He was one of the early stars for the Triangles. In November 1919, the Dayton Daily News wrote:

Hauser was the star of the Triangle line. This clever tackle was in practically every play on his side and when he was not stopping one of the Hoosiers, he was making it an easy matter for some other Triangle to turn the trick."

Hauser was with the Triangles when they joined the newly-organized National Football League (NFL) for the 1920 season. He also played for the Cincinnati Celts in 1921. Hauser appeared in a total of nine or ten NFL games, six of them as a starter. He scored one touchdown for the Celts in 1921.
