= Norb Sacksteder =

American football player (1895–1986)

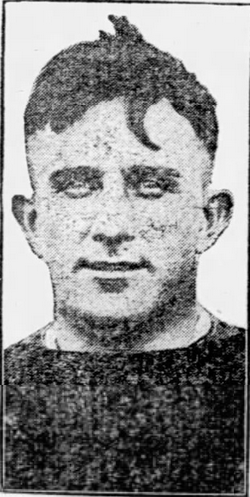

No. 4
- Positions: Halfback, fullback, quarterback

Personal information
- Born: September 25, 1895; Dayton, Ohio, U.S.
- Died: June 19, 1986 (aged 90)
- Listed height: 5 ft 9 in (1.75 m)
- Listed weight: 173 lb (78 kg)

Career information
- College: Christian Brothers University, University of Dayton

Career history
- Dayton Triangles (1914–1920); Detroit Heralds (1916–1917, 1919–1920); Detroit Tigers (1921); Canton Bulldogs (1922); Canton Bulldogs (1925)

Awards and highlights
- NFL champion (1922); Second-team All-Pro (1920)
- Stats at Pro Football Reference

Norbert N. Sacksteder (September 25, 1895 – June 19, 1986) was a professional football player during the early years of the National Football League with the Dayton Triangles, Detroit Heralds, Detroit Tigers and the Canton Bulldogs. Sacksteder was a part of the Bulldogs' 1922 NFL championship team. He was considered one of the greatest breakaway runners of his time.

== College ==
Before he joined the NFL, Sacksteder was a basketball standout at the University of Dayton, then called St. Marys Institute. In the fall of 1913, Norb helped form a football team under the school's name, the St. Marys Cadets. The team's first year posted a 7–0 record. St. Mary's then won the Dayton city championship and then defeated the Cincinnati Celts 27–0 at Redland Park in Cincinnati.

== Professional football ==
After college, Sacksteder played exclusively for the Dayton Triangles. In 1917 though he played for the Detroit Heralds. In 1917, at the outbreak of American's involvement in World War I, he joined the United States Army. In 1918 Norb, under coach Greasy Neale, defeated the Hammond Pros 23–0 in Sacksteder's only known game that season. He may have been on leave from the service or perhaps simply retired for the remainder of the season.

The Triangles would later become a founder of the NFL, then called the American Professional Football Association. On October 3, 1920, The Triangles defeated the Columbus Panhandles 14–0 at Triangle Park in the first game between two NFL teams. Norb was in the line-up for Dayton during that historic game.
