= Johnny Dingle =

American football player (born 1986)

No. 92
- Position: Defensive end

Personal information
- Born: November 9, 1984 (age 41); Miami, Florida, U.S.
- Listed height: 6 ft 1 in (1.85 m)
- Listed weight: 265 lb (120 kg)

Career information
- College: West Virginia
- NFL draft: 2008: undrafted

Career history
- Kansas City Chiefs (2008)*; Cleveland Gladiators (2010)*; Abilene Ruff Riders (2010); Jacksonville Sharks (2012)*
- * Offseason or practice squad member only

Awards and highlights
- Second-team All-Big East (2007); 2007 Gridiron Gladiator Award; Fiesta Bowl champion (2008)
- Stats at ArenaFan.com

Johnny Dingle
Medal record

Men's American football

Representing United States

World Championship
Gold medal – first place	2011 Austria	Team competition

Johnny Dingle (born November 9, 1984) is an American former football defensive lineman. He played collegiately at West Virginia. He was undrafted in the 2008 NFL draft.

Dingle was one of the league's most sought after undrafted rookie free agents, and was signed by the Kansas City Chiefs, but was waived after being signed to the practice squad.

== Early life ==
Dingle was a four-year starter at defensive end at Booker T. Washington High School, where he recorded 89 tackles and 22 sacks as a senior. He also had a blocked punt and a game-saving field goal block as well. He also has his football number retired at the school. He was named All-State, named Dade County Player of the Year, and was the captain of the basketball team. He originally signed with Florida, but then changed his decision to West Virginia.

== College career ==
Dingle enrolled at West Virginia University in 2004, but sat out the season due to grades. In 2005 as a sophomore, he recorded 13 tackles and 2.5 sacks on the season. As a junior in 2006, he started early at defensive end. Against Mississippi State, he had a two sacks for a total of 16 yards while he forced a fumble against Wofford. He missed the Syracuse and Connecticut with an ankle injury, but bounced back with two tackles against Louisville. In 2007, he was on the defensive line with Keilen Dykes. Dingle was named Second-team All-Big East and earned the team's Gridiron Gladiator Award at the conclusion of the regular season. In his final collegiate game, the 48–28 victory over Oklahoma in the 2008 Fiesta Bowl. He finished his senior season with 47 tackles, three sacks, two forced fumbles, and one fumble recovery. He, along with Pat White, and Marc Magro, was named an Honorable Mention All-American by Sports Illustrated.com.

== Professional career ==
=== Pre-draft ===
On December 20, 2007, Dingle announced his intentions to leave West Virginia University to enter the NFL draft. He still had a year of eligibility left, due to being a junior.

=== NFL draft ===
Scott Wright, owner of NFL Draft Countdown, projected Dingle at #29 in the defensive end class. He was also invited to the NFL Scouting Combine. At the Combine, he was reported to have met with the Atlanta Falcons, Detroit Lions and Denver Broncos. In April 2008, USA Today ranked Dingle as the #12 defensive end and as a fourth round selection in the Draft. He was, however, not selected in the NFL Draft and thus became an undrafted free agent at the draft's conclusion.

=== Kansas City Chiefs ===
After going undrafted in the 2008 NFL draft, Dingle was one of the league's most sought after undrafted players. He was signed by the Kansas City Chiefs. In the second week of the preseason, he recorded a tackle and a sack in his preseason debut against the Arizona Cardinals. However, after the preseason Dingle was waived from the Chiefs squad.

=== Abilene Ruff Riders ===
Johnny signed with the Abilene Ruff Riders of the Indoor Football League in December 2009.
