= Raudenbusch =

Surname of German origin

Raudenbusch is a surname of German origin. Its variants in the United States include Roudabush, Roudebush, Rodenbush, Roudenbush, and Ruebush.

According to genealogists, the earliest person to whom the Raudenbusch lines can be traced is Hans Peter, who had been born prior to 1600 and continued to operate a flour mill throughout the Thirty Years War. For this, the Kurpfalz Government paid homage to him by giving him the towns' mill. Hans Peter Raudenbusch died October 17, 1657, in Reihen, Baden-Württemberg. The mill is still in continuous use today (2008).

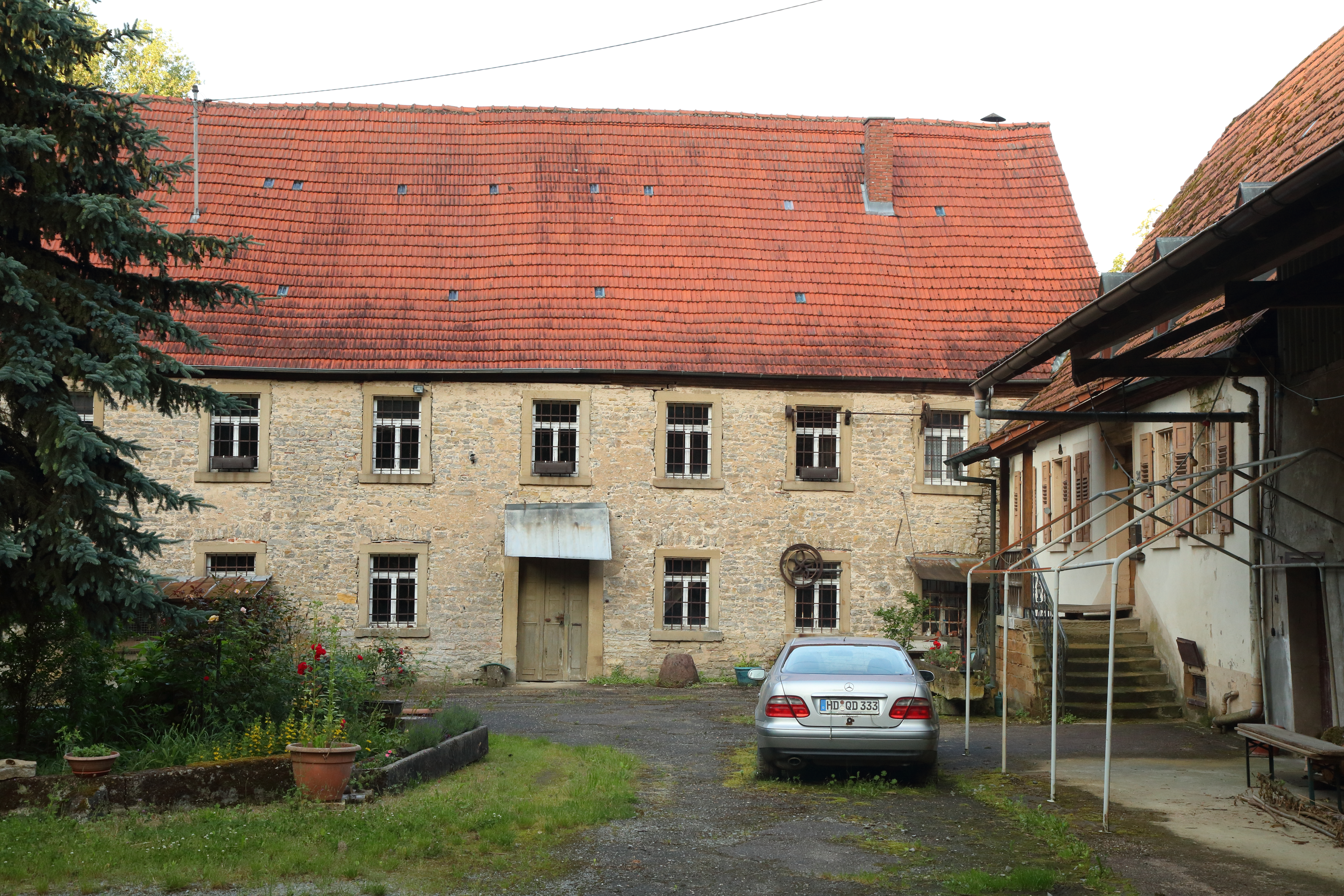
Flour mill once owned by Hans Peter Raudenbusch, located in Reihen, Baden-Württemberg

== Diffusion in the United States ==
Among the masses of emigrants from the Palatinate of Germany in the early 18th century was Hans Heinrich Raudenbusch. Born in Steinsfurt (Sinsheim) around 1712, he was the grandson of Hans Peter Raudenbusch.

Hans Heinrich Raudenbusch was a founding member of the Upper Conowago Church of the Brethren, also known as Mummert's Church in Abbottstown, Pennsylvania. He sailed for America aboard the ship Dragon in 1732. He was deeded property near Abbottstown by the son of William Penn.

== Name corruption and diffusion ==
The name Raudenbusch stayed intact until Heinrich's sons were married. The surname Roudebush is prominent in the families that moved west into Ohio and Indiana; the spelling Roudabush is popular in the Virginia areas; and the surname Ruebush has its beginnings alongside of the Virginia Roudabushes to distinguish themselves from their cousins. In the cemetery in Dayton, Rockingham County, Virginia, Ruebush families and Roudabush families are buried side by side.
