= Booker T. Washington Senior High School (Miami, Florida) =

Public high school in Miami, Florida, United States

Coordinates: 25.786283°N 80.204772°W

Location
- 1200 NW 6th Ave; Miami, Florida 33136; United States

Information
- Type: Public secondary
- Motto: Not the Largest But The Best
- Established: August 1926 to 1967 regained high school status August 1999
- Status: Active
- School district: Miami-Dade County Public Schools
- Principal: Anthony E. Simons III
- Teaching staff: 54.00 (FTE)
- Grades: 9–12
- Enrollment: 1,036 (2023-2024)
- Student to teacher ratio: 19.19
- Campus: Urban
- Color
- Mascot: Tornado
- Team name: Tornadoes
- School hours: 7:20 AM to 2:20 PM
- Average class size: 16
- Website: Booker T. Washington website
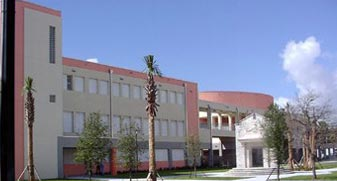

Booker T. Washington Senior High School is a normal four year High School located at 1200 NW 6th Avenue in Miami, Florida, United States. It is located in the Overtown neighborhood, and serves families in the Overtown, Downtown, Park West, and Arts & Entertainment District neighborhoods. Its principal is Anthony E. Simons III.

== History ==
Booker T. Washington Senior High School was originally founded in the area of colored town in August 1926 as the first high school for black students in South Florida. Students from as far as Palm Beach County and Key West came to Booker T. to receive their education. With 1,340 students scheduled to attend in Miami, the institution was unable to open its doors due to bombings of the school and resulted in a rescheduling for March 27, 1927. It is the second oldest public high school built for the black residents of Dade County, after George Washington Carver Sr. High and the first one in the City of Miami. The school was started by the St. Paul A.M.E. Church of Coconut Grove. Students from as far as Palm Beach County came to this school. The school thrived from opening in 1927 as an all-black school up until 1966.

It was converted to a middle school in 1967, to help desegregate the Miami-Dade County Public Schools. A $12 million expansion resulted in construction renovation for the current Booker T. Washington Senior High which began in 2002 and the school was converted back to a high school as an overcrowding reliever facility for Miami High School and Miami Edison Senior High School in 2002.

As of 2010, the FCAT was terminated from mainstream use and has since been alternated for the Florida End Of course Exam along with English Language Arts and Mathematical assessments.

The school has a 40-ft. diameter teaching planetarium.

== Demographics ==
Booker T. Washington is 38% Black, 59% Hispanic (of any race), and 3% white non-Hispanic.

== Athletics ==
The Miami Booker T. Washington Tornadoes athletic rivals in Miami are Miami Northwestern Bulls and Miami Central Rockets.

In May 2007 the Tornadoes were Florida's FHSAA Class 3A State Champions in track and field.

After finishing as runner-up in the 2011 championship game, the Tornadoes won consecutive FHSAA Class 4A Football State Championships in 2012 and 2013.

The coach at the time was head coach Tim Harris. The team was also selected as the 2013 winner of the High School Football National Championship, an honor awarded on rankings from USA Today's National Prep Poll. The Tornadoes' national championship selection was supported by a 14–0 season that included a 55–0 defeat of the then-national #6 ranked Blue Devils of Norcross, Georgia, followed with a win over the then-national #2 ranked (and Miami-Dade county rival) Miami Central Rockets, 28–17 on September 6, 2013.

In 2014, Tim Harris Jr. assumed the head coaching role. With a 41-0 winning streak the team was awarded a national ranking of #2 in the nation by USA Today's Super25 Rankings. This was supported by a 15–0 season that included a 55–27 defeat of then state champion Oscar F. Smith Tigers of Chesapeake, Virginia and Tucker Knights out of Atlanta, Georgia. Also includes a wins over rival Miami Central Rockets who were ranked #6 in the nation and a O.T thriller with the Bingham Miners of Utah ranked #8 in a state champion bowl series matchup and becoming recognized as the first four time state champion in Dade County.

The school in total has 7 football titles, including 1 National(2013), and 6 State Championships(2007,2012,2013,2014,2015,2019) and 16 consecutive district 8-4A titles.

== Notable alumni ==
- Maurice Alexander (2015), NFL wide receiver for the Chicago Bears
- Jacorey Brooks (2021-transferred), NFL wide receiver for the Washington Commanders
- Antonio Callaway (2015), former American football wide receiver
- Johnny Dingle (2003), former American football defensive lineman
- Antonio Dixon (2004), former American football nose tackle
- Quinton Dunbar (2010), former American football cornerback
- Ben Hanks III (2025), college football cornerback for the Florida Gators
- Brandon Harris (2008), former American football player and current cornerbacks coach for the Florida Gators
- Treon Harris (2014), former college football quarterback and wide receiver
- Denver Kirkland (2013), former American football guard
- Larry Little, former American football guard
- Esther Rolle (transferred), actress
- Kadeem Telfort (2017), NFL tackle for the Miami Dolphins
- Chad Thomas (2014), former American football defensive end
- Matthew Thomas (2013), former American football linebacker
- Corey Thornton (2020), NFL cornerback for the Carolina Panthers
- Tyquan Thornton (2018), NFL wide receiver for the Kansas City Chiefs
- Lynden Trail (2010), former American football linebacker
- Mark Walton (2015), former NFL running back

== See also ==
- List of things named after Booker T. Washington
