= Fritz Slackford =

American football player (1894–1962)

Profile
- Positions: Wingback, fullback, end

Personal information
- Born: March 27, 1894; Danbury, Ohio, US
- Died: July 12, 1962 (aged 68); Cleveland, Ohio, US
- Listed height: 6 ft 0 in (1.83 m)
- Listed weight: 180 lb (82 kg)

Career information
- College: Denison College, Notre Dame

Career history
- Dayton Triangles (1920); Canton Bulldogs (1921)
- Stats at Pro Football Reference

Frederick John "Fritz" Slackford (March 27, 1894 – July 12, 1962) was a professional football player who spent two years in the National Football League with the Dayton Triangles in 1920 and the Canton Bulldogs in 1921. Prior to joining the NFL, Slackford played college football at the University of Notre Dame. He graduated from there in 1920. While in college he missed the 1917-1918 and 1918-1919 football seasons to fight in World War I. In 1919 Slackford and several other Irish players, were paid $400 to take part in a professional football championship game held in Rockford, Illinois. This was against Notre Dame's athletic policy and any player found guilty faced expulsion. To hide his identity, Slackford was given the alias "Scone". Slackford died in 1962 after a long illness.
