= Tom Toner =

American football player (1950–1990)

No. 59
- Position: Linebacker

Personal information
- Born: January 25, 1950; Woburn, Massachusetts, U.S.
- Died: August 26, 1990 (aged 40); Solana Beach, California, U.S.
- Listed height: 6 ft 3 in (1.91 m)
- Listed weight: 235 lb (107 kg)

Career information
- High school: Swampscott
- College: Idaho State
- NFL draft: 1973: 6th round, 152nd overall pick

Career history
- Green Bay Packers (1973–1977)

Awards and highlights
- Idaho State Sports Hall of Fame (1990)

Career NFL statistics
- Games played - started: 53-9
- Interceptions: 4
- Fumble recoveries: 2
- Stats at Pro Football Reference

Thomas Edward Toner (January 25, 1950 – August 26, 1990) was an American professional football player who was a linebacker for four seasons for the Green Bay Packers. His Brother Ed plays for the Boston Patriots from 1967-1969 and his Nephew Ed Toner plays for the Indianapolis Colts.

== Early life ==
Toner was born in Boston, Massachusetts, the son of parents Joseph P Toner and Eleanor V Toner (née Connelly). In 1969 aged 19, he graduated from Swampscott High School, where he was recognised for his football abilities, going on to study physical education at Idaho State University.

== Career ==
After playing as a linebacker for Green Bay Packers for five years in the NFL draft from 1973, he moved to become an agent. In 1978, he established Professional Sports Management, providing agency and financial planning for various athletes.

== Death ==
He died on August 26, 1990 at home following a lengthy illness. He left wife Susan and two children.
