= Lynden Trail =

American football player (born 1991)

Lynden Trail Sr
No. 98, 7
- Position: Linebacker

Personal information
- Born: March 19, 1991 (age 35); Miami, Florida, U.S.
- Listed height: 6 ft 7 in (2.01 m)
- Listed weight: 280 lb (127 kg)

Career information
- High school: Booker T. Washington (Miami)
- College: Norfolk State
- NFL draft: 2015: undrafted

Career history
- Houston Texans (2015)*; Washington Redskins (2015–2016)*; Los Angeles Rams (2016)*; Washington Redskins (2016); Hamilton Tiger-Cats (2018)*; Atlantic City Blackjacks (2019)
- * Offseason or practice squad member only

Career NFL statistics
- Total tackles: 2
- Sacks: 2
- Forced fumbles: 0
- Fumble recoveries: 0
- Pass deflections: 1
- Stats at Pro Football Reference
- Stats at ArenaFan.com

Lynden Antonio Trail (born March 19, 1991) is an American former professional football player who was a linebacker in the National Football League (NFL). He was signed as an undrafted free agent by the Houston Texans in 2015. He played college football for the Norfolk State Spartans.

He was also member of the Washington Redskins, Los Angeles Rams, Hamilton Tiger-Cats, and Atlantic City Blackjacks.

== Professional career ==
Pre-draft measurables
Height	Weight	Arm length	Hand span	Wingspan	40-yard dash	10-yard split	20-yard split	20-yard shuttle	Three-cone drill	Vertical jump	Broad jump	Bench press
6 ft 6 5/8 in (2.00 m)	269 lb (122 kg)	34 7/8 in (0.89 m)	10 1/2 in (0.27 m)	6 ft 11 1/4 in (2.11 m)	4.86 s	1.71 s	2.87 s	4.48 s	7.32 s	32.5 in (0.83 m)	9 ft 9 in (2.97 m)	24 reps
All values from NFL Combine/Pro Day

=== Houston Texans ===
After going unselected in the 2015 NFL draft, Trail signed with the Houston Texans. On September 11, 2015, the team released him with an injury settlement.

=== Washington Redskins (first stint) ===
Trail was signed to the Washington Redskins' practice squad on October 5, 2015. He was released on October 12 but was re-signed back to the team's practice squad on November 23, 2015.

Trail signed a futures contract with the Redskins on January 11, 2016. On September 3, 2016, Trail was waived by the Redskins, but was re-signed with their practice squad a day later. The team waived him again on September 19.

=== Los Angeles Rams ===
The Los Angeles Rams signed Trail to their practice squad on September 27, 2016. He was released on October 1, 2016.

=== Washington Redskins (second stint) ===
On December 22, 2016, Trail was re-signed to the Redskins' practice squad, and was promoted to the active roster the following day.

On September 2, 2017, Trail was waived/injured by the Redskins and placed on injured reserve. The team released him with an injury settlement on September 7, 2017.

=== Hamilton Tiger-Cats ===
In early 2018, Trail took part in The Spring League, a developmental minor league football organization which highlights young talent for NFL and CFL scouts. Following his participation in The Spring League, Trail was signed by the Hamilton Tiger-Cats of the Canadian Football League on May 5 as a defensive lineman.

=== Atlantic City Blackjacks ===
On April 2, 2019, Trail was assigned to the Atlantic City Blackjacks of the Arena Football League.

== Personal life ==
Trail is Catholic.
