= Lou Partlow =

American football player (1892–1981)

Profile
- Position: Running back

Personal information
- Born: October 9, 1892; Miamisburg, Ohio, U.S.
- Died: April 14, 1981 (age 88); Burbank, California, U.S.

Career information
- College: None

Career history
- 1914–1927: West Carrollton Paper Company, Dayton Triangles

Louis (or Lewis) Jerald Partlow (October 9, 1892 – April 14, 1981) was a running back who played ten seasons with the Dayton Triangles in the National Football League (NFL). He is always remembered for being the first professional footballer to score an official touchdown in NFL history.

Lou Partlow started in 1914 with the West Carrollton Paper Company team, where he earned the nickname "West Carrollton Battering Ram" due to his training routine which involved deliberately smashing into trees. Partlow also played with the Cincinnati Celts before joining the Dayton Gym-Cadets in 1915, the year before they changed their name to the Dayton Triangles. On 3 October 1920, the Dayton Triangles beat the Columbus Panhandles 14–0 in the first ever NFL game, in which Partlow scored the first touchdown.

Partlow retired in 1927.

== Early life ==
Louis was the seventh child (of eleven) born to Adam Granville Partlow (1857–1928) and Amanda Isabell Muirhead (1864–1947). His siblings: Clara, George, William Jesse, Gussie, Mary, Frank, Vernie (who died in early childhood), Madge, Violet and Dorothy.

== Personal life ==
He went by "Lou".

He married Ruth Eloda Myers (1893–1981). She was the daughter of John Henry Myers and Mary Hipple. They had two daughters. The family lived in Ohio for many years, but in the 1950s Lou and Ruth moved to California. This is where they lived out the rest of their long lives, and are buried. Lou died at the age of 88, and Ruth at the age of 86. They are buried at Forest Lawn Memorial Park, Hollywood Hills.
