= Dick Abrell =

American football player (1892–1973)

Profile
- Positions: Blocking back, wingback

Personal information
- Born: May 18, 1892; Linton, Indiana, U.S.
- Died: May 5, 1973 (aged 80); West Orange, New Jersey, U.S.
- Listed height: 5 ft 10 in (1.78 m)
- Listed weight: 172 lb (78 kg)

Career information
- High school: Linton (IN)
- College: Purdue

Career history
- Dayton Triangles (1920)

Career NFL statistics
- Games played: 6
- Rushing TDs: 1
- Stats at Pro Football Reference

Richard Thompson Abrell (May 18, 1892 – May 5, 1973) was an American football player who played one season for the Dayton Triangles of the American Professional Football Association (APFA). He played college football at Purdue University.
