= Larry Dellinger =

American football player (1893–1954)

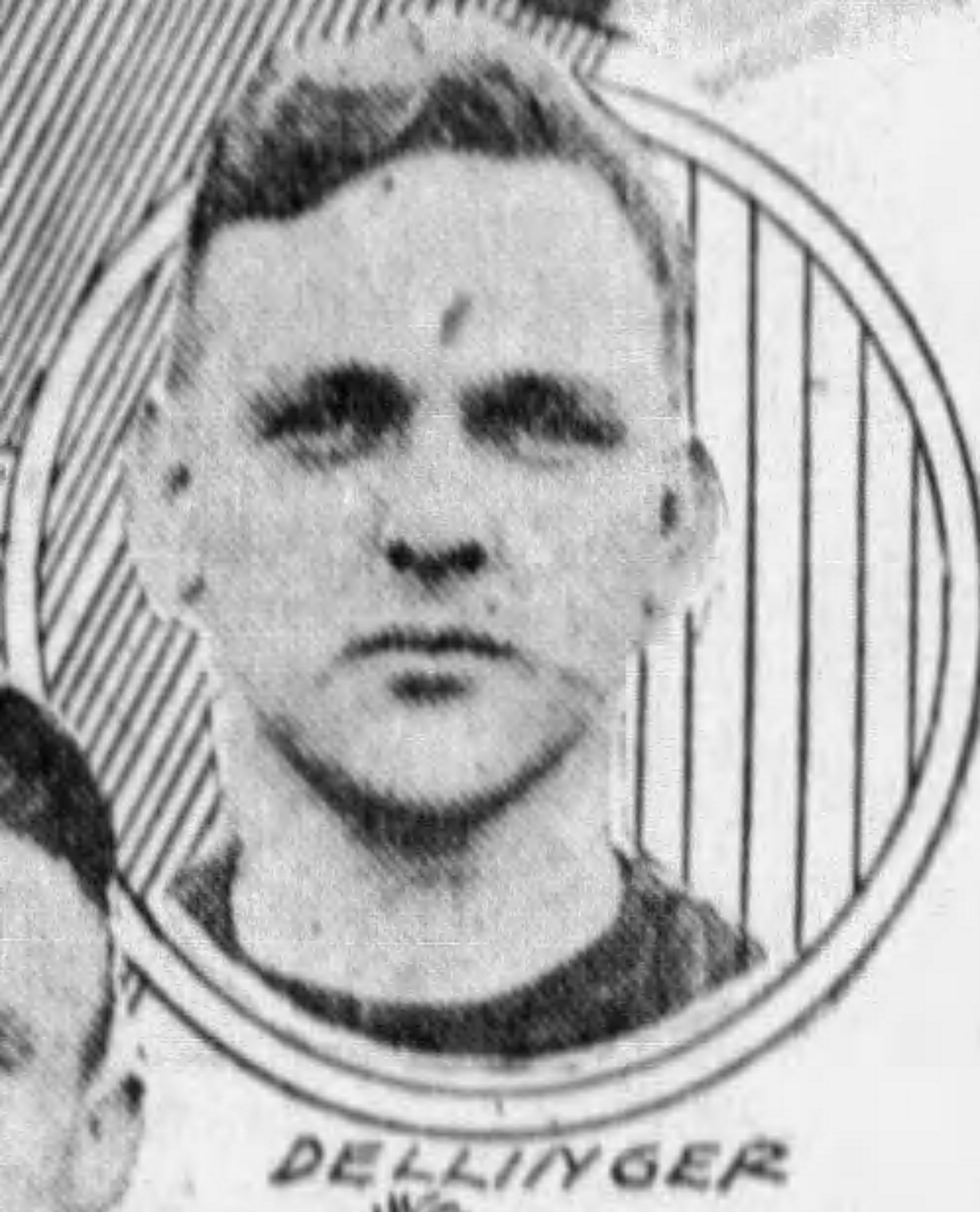
- Larry Dellinger, 1917

Profile
- Positions: Guard, tackle

Personal information
- Born: April 1, 1893; Bath Township, Ohio, U.S.
- Died: February 18, 1954 (aged 60); Dayton, Ohio, U.S.
- Listed height: 5 ft 11 in (1.80 m)
- Listed weight: 204 lb (93 kg)

Career information
- High school: Osborn (OH), University of Dayton Prep (OH)

Career history
- Dayton Cadets (1913–1914); Dayton Gym-Cadets (1915); Dayton Triangles (1916–1923)

Career statistics
- Games: 23

Lawrence E. Dellinger (April 1, 1893 – February 18, 1954) was an American football player.

Dellinger was born in 1893 in Bath Township, Greene County, Ohio. He attended Osborn High School and University of Dayton Prep. He was rated as the best football player ever produced by Osborn High School.

Dellinger played professional football as a guard and tackle for the Dayton Cadets/Gym-Cadets from 1913 to 1915. He remained with the club in 1916 when the team changed its name to the Dayton Triangles. He also remained with the team in 1920 when the Triangles became one of the inaugural members of the newly-formed American Professional Football Association, which was renamed the National Football League (NFL) in 1922. Dellinger played a total of eight seasons with the club from 1915 to 1923. He appeared in 23 NFL games, 14 as a starter, from 1920 to 1923.

After his football career ended, Dellinger worked for 29 years as a salesman for the Southwestern Portland Cement Company. He served in the Army during World War II. died in 1954 at Dayton's Miami Valley Hospital at age 60.
