= Joe Tuipala =

American football player (born 1976)

No. 48, 52
- Position: Linebacker

Personal information
- Born: September 13, 1976 (age 50); Honolulu, Hawaii, U.S.
- Listed height: 6 ft 1 in (1.85 m)
- Listed weight: 248 lb (112 kg)

Career information
- High school: Burroughs (Ridgecrest, California)
- College: San Diego State
- NFL draft: 1999: undrafted

Career history
- Detroit Lions (1999)*; New Orleans Saints (1999); → Barcelona Dragons (2000); Las Vegas Outlaws (2001); Jacksonville Jaguars (2001–2003); Washington Redskins (2005)*; → Cologne Centurions (2005); Winnipeg Blue Bombers (2005)
- * Offseason or practice squad member only

Awards and highlights
- Las Vegas Bowl Defensive MVP (1998)
- Stats at Pro Football Reference

Joseph Lafaele Tuipala (born September 13, 1976) is an American former professional football player who was a linebacker in the National Football League (NFL). He is the nephew of former New England Patriots running back Mosi Tatupu, and first cousin of Seattle Seahawks linebacker Lofa Tatupu. He played two seasons in the NFL with the Jacksonville Jaguars. He was also a member of the New Orleans Saints and Washington Redskins, including assignments to various NFL Europe teams.

Born in Honolulu, Hawaii, he is of Samoan descent. Tuipala is the son of Tautofi Tuipala (father) and Maude "Moki" Scanlan (mother), both from American Samoa. Tuipala attended Sherman E. Burroughs High School in Ridgecrest, California. He went on to play college football for the San Diego State Aztecs, and was named Defensive MVP of the 1998 Las Vegas Bowl.
