= Ed Toner (defensive tackle) =

American football player (born 1943)

No. 75
- Position: Defensive tackle

Personal information
- Born: September 11, 1943; Reading, Massachusetts, U.S.
- Died: August 28, 2025 (aged 81)
- Listed height: 6 ft 2 in (1.88 m)
- Listed weight: 250 lb (113 kg)

Career information
- High school: Lynn English
- College: UMass
- NFL draft: 1966: 18th round, 275th overall pick
- AFL draft: 1966: 3rd round, 20th overall pick

Career history
- Boston Patriots (1967–1970)
- Stats at Pro Football Reference

Edward William Toner (September 11, 1943-August 28, 2025) is an American former professional football player who was a defensive tackle for the Boston Patriots of American Football League (AFL). He played college football for the University of Massachusetts Amherst.

His brother Tom Toner plays for the Green Bay Packers and his son Ed Toner plays for the Indianapolis Colts.
