= Ed Toner =

American football player (born 1968)

No. 28, 44
- Position: Fullback

Personal information
- Born: March 22, 1968 (age 58); Lynn, Massachusetts, U.S.
- Listed height: 6 ft 0 in (1.83 m)
- Listed weight: 240 lb (109 kg)

Career information
- High school: Swampscott
- College: Boston College
- NFL draft: 1991: undrafted

Career history
- Indianapolis Colts (1991–1994); Pittsburgh Steelers (1995)*
- * Offseason or practice squad member only

Career NFL statistics
- Rushing yards: 17
- Rushing average: 5.7
- Receptions: 1
- Receiving yards: 5
- Stats at Pro Football Reference

Edward William Toner Jr. (born March 22, 1968) is an American former professional football player who was a fullback in the National Football League (NFL). He played college football for the Boston College Eagles.

== College career ==
Toner finished his collegiate career at Boston College with 687 yards and 18 touchdowns on 202 carries and 41 receptions for 293 yards and three touchdowns.

== Professional career ==
After going unselected in the 1991 NFL draft, Toner was signed by the Indianapolis Colts as an undrafted free agent. He was cut during the preseason but was resigned for the 1992 season. After the 1994 season the Colts opted not to tender Toner a contract. He was signed by the Pittsburgh Steelers in April 1995 but was waived during training camp.

== Personal life ==
Toner's father, Ed Toner Sr, and uncle, Tom Toner, both played in the NFL.
