= Lofa Tatupu =

American football player and coach (born 1982)

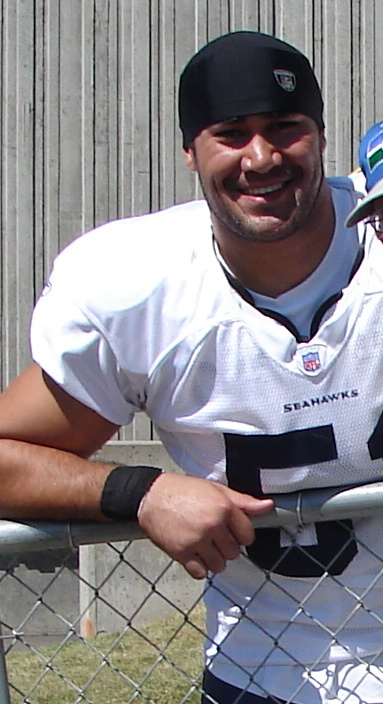
- Tatupu in 2007

No. 51
- Position: Linebacker

Personal information
- Born: November 15, 1982 (age 43); San Diego, California, U.S.
- Listed height: 6 ft 0 in (1.83 m)
- Listed weight: 250 lb (113 kg)

Career information
- High school: King Philip Regional (Wrentham, Massachusetts)
- College: USC
- NFL draft: 2005: 2nd round, 45th overall pick

Career history

Playing
- Seattle Seahawks (2005–2010); Atlanta Falcons (2012)*
- * Offseason or practice squad member only

Coaching
- Seattle Seahawks (2015–2016) Assistant linebacker coach

Awards and highlights
- First-team All-Pro (2007); 3× Pro Bowl (2005–2007); PFWA All-Rookie Team (2005); Seattle Seahawks 35th Anniversary team; Seattle Seahawks Top 50 players; 2× AP national champion (2003, 2004); First-team All-American (2004); First-team All-Pac-10 (2004)

Career NFL statistics
- Total tackles: 552
- Sacks: 8.5
- Forced fumbles: 7
- Fumble recoveries: 2
- Interceptions: 10
- Defensive touchdowns: 2
- Stats at Pro Football Reference

Mosiula Mea'alofa "Lofa" Tatupu (born November 15, 1982) is an American former professional football player who was a linebacker for six seasons with the Seattle Seahawks of the National Football League (NFL). He played college football for the USC Trojans. Tatupu was selected by Seahawks in the second round of the 2005 NFL draft. After his playing career, he was an assistant linebackers coach with the Seahawks.

== Early life ==
Tatupu was born in San Diego, California and graduated in 2001 from King Philip Regional High School in Wrentham, Massachusetts, where he played quarterback and linebacker in his junior and senior year. His high school coach was his father Mosi Tatupu, a fullback and special teamer who played for the New England Patriots. As a quarterback, Lofa Tatupu threw for 800 yards and 10 touchdowns and rushed for 450 yards and five touchdowns. As a linebacker, Tatupu made 100 tackles. The Sun Chronicle named Tatupu a local high school All-Star in 1999 and 2000.

== College career ==
Tatupu spent his freshman year of college at the University of Maine before transferring to the University of Southern California, where he majored in sociology and played for the USC Trojans football team. He wore the number 58, which was later worn by another USC linebacker of Samoan heritage, Rey Maualuga. Tatupu played within the player development program managed by head coach Pete Carroll and assistant head coach for defense and linebacker coach Ken Norton Jr. The USC linebacker system ("USC Linebacker U") has developed many NFL stars, often touted as the most talented linebacker corps in college football.

Tatupu started 25 games during his two years for the Trojans. He finished his USC career with 202 tackles, nine sacks, seven interceptions, three fumble recoveries, three forced fumbles, 18 pass deflections, and one touchdown. He received first-team All-American honors from Sports Illustrated following the 2004 season.

== Professional career ==
=== 2005 NFL draft ===
Tatupu was selected 45th overall in the second round of the 2005 NFL draft by the Seattle Seahawks. Some teams had him rated lower than the second round. Seahawks general manager Tim Ruskell, who used two fourth-round picks to move up nine spots in the draft to get him, took some criticism for trading up for Tatupu, who was considered slightly undersized and a little slow. Upon joining the Seahawks, Tatupu became a teammate of Matt Hasselbeck. Hasselbeck's father Don had been a teammate of Lofa's father Mosi during Mosi's career with the New England Patriots.

=== Pre-draft measurables ===
Pre-draft measurables
Height	Weight	Arm length	Hand span	40-yard dash	10-yard split	20-yard split	20-yard shuttle	Three-cone drill	Vertical jump	Broad jump	Bench press	Wonderlic
5 ft 11 7/8 in (1.83 m)	238 lb (108 kg)	31 5/8 in (0.80 m)	10 in (0.25 m)	4.83 s	1.63 s	2.78 s	4.21 s	7.32 s	35 in (0.89 m)	9 ft 8 in (2.95 m)	23 reps	29
All values from NFL Combine, except broad jump from USC Pro Day

=== Seattle Seahawks ===
Tatupu quickly established himself as one of the top defensive players in the league as a rookie in 2005, in which he was named to the Pro Bowl, while leading the NFC Champion Seahawks in tackles, with 104, en route to their first Super Bowl appearance in franchise history. He also had four sacks and three interceptions, returning one for a touchdown in Seattle's 42-0 Monday Night Football victory against the Philadelphia Eagles. On December 2, 2007, he continued his success against the Philadelphia Eagles, intercepting three passes and returning them for a total of 100 yards off of Eagles' quarterback A. J. Feeley.

In Tatupu's first three seasons, he led the Seahawks in tackles. He was voted to the Pro Bowl for the first three years of his NFL career: 2005, 2006 and 2007. In 2007, Tatupu was voted to the All-Pro team by the AP. In 2008, Tatupu was hampered by nagging injuries which resulted in him playing at a lower level than he has in the past, and as a result cost him a chance to play in four consecutive Pro Bowls.

Tatupu emerged as the Seahawks' leader on defense, making his teammates more attentive to preparation by watching more game tape and calling defensive signals on the field.

On March 21, 2008, the Seahawks signed Tatupu to a six-year contract extension through the year 2015. The deal was worth $42 million, with $18 million guaranteed alone in the years 2008 to 2010. The contract made Tatupu one of the six highest-paid linebackers in the league. Tatupu responded by stating, "I'm going to end my career with the Seahawks."

On October 19, 2009, during a game versus the Arizona Cardinals, Tatupu tore his left pectoral muscle after a collision with teammate Deon Grant and was ruled out for the rest of the season, a huge loss to the already ailing Seahawks. This was the first major injury of Tatupu's professional career after missing only one game in his first four seasons in the NFL.

After suffering through his worst season in 2009, Tatupu was able to play in every game for the Seahawks in 2010, including their two playoff games. Tatupu was released by Seattle on July 31, 2011, after he and the Seahawks could not come to an agreement on a re-structured contract.

=== Atlanta Falcons ===
On March 10, 2012, Tatupu signed a two-year, $5.75 million contract with the Atlanta Falcons. On July 24, 2012, Tatupu suffered a torn pectoral and would miss the entire 2012 NFL season. The Falcons released him the next day.

=== NFL statistics ===
Years	Team	GP	COMB	TOTAL	AST	SACK	FF	FR	FR YDS	INT	IR YDS	AVG IR	LNG IR	TD	PD
2005	SEA	16	104	85	19	4.0	0	1	0	3	55	18	38	1	9
2006	SEA	16	123	92	31	1.5	2	1	0	1	19	19	19	0	7
2007	SEA	16	109	83	26	1.0	3	0	0	4	116	29	49	0	9
2008	SEA	15	94	69	25	0.0	1	0	0	1	16	16	16	0	4
2009	SEA	5	32	21	11	1.0	0	0	0	0	0	0	0	0	2
2010	SEA	16	88	58	30	1.0	1	0	0	1	26	26	26	1	8
Career		84	550	408	142	8.5	7	2	0	10	232	23	49	2	39

== Coaching career ==
The Seahawks announced on February 9, 2015, that Tatupu would be joining Pete Carroll and new defensive coordinator Kris Richard's staff as assistant linebacker coach. He resigned from his position two years later.

== Personal life ==
Tatupu is of Samoan descent. He is the son of the late former USC Trojan and New England Patriots fullback Mosi Tatupu, and first cousin of former NFL linebacker Joe Tuipala. In 2019, he founded his own CBD company called ZoneIn CBD.
