= Wayne Haddix =

American football player (born 1965)

No. 37, 45
- Position: Cornerback

Personal information
- Born: July 23, 1965 (age 61); Bolivar, Tennessee, U.S.
- Listed height: 6 ft 1 in (1.85 m)
- Listed weight: 203 lb (92 kg)

Career information
- College: Liberty
- NFL draft: 1987: undrafted

Career history
- New York Giants (1987–1988); Tampa Bay Buccaneers (1990–1991); Cincinnati Bengals (1991)

Awards and highlights
- Pro Bowl (1990)

Career NFL statistics
- Interceptions: 7
- Yards: 231
- Touchdowns: 3
- Stats at Pro Football Reference

Samuel LaWayne Haddix (born July 23, 1965) is an American former professional football player who was a defensive back in the National Football League (NFL) for the New York Giants (1987–1988), Tampa Bay Buccaneers (1990–1991), and Cincinnati Bengals (1991). Haddix was selected to the Pro Bowl in 1990, when he recorded all seven of his career interceptions. He played college football for the Liberty Flames.

Haddix attended Middleton High School in Middleton, Tennessee.

Pre-draft measurables
Height	Weight	Arm length	Hand span	40-yard dash	10-yard split	20-yard split	20-yard shuttle	Vertical jump	Broad jump	Bench press
6 ft 1 1/8 in (1.86 m)	200 lb (91 kg)	32 3/4 in (0.83 m)	8 3/4 in (0.22 m)	4.67 s	1.59 s	2.73 s	4.35 s	37.0 in (0.94 m)	10 ft 2 in (3.10 m)	8 reps
All values from NFL Combine
