= Ed Thomas (American football) =

American football player (born 1966)

No. 86
- Position: Tight end

Personal information
- Born: May 4, 1966 (age 60); New Orleans, Louisiana, U.S.
- Listed height: 6 ft 3 in (1.91 m)
- Listed weight: 240 lb (109 kg)

Career information
- High school: Booker T. Washington (New Orleans)
- College: Houston
- NFL draft: 1990: undrafted

Career history
- Tampa Bay Buccaneers (1990–1991); Buffalo Bills (1992)
- Stats at Pro Football Reference

Edward Lee Thomas (born May 4, 1966) is an American former professional football tight end who played for the Tampa Bay Buccaneers of the National Football League (NFL). He played college football for the Houston Cougars.

== Early life ==
Edward Lee Thomas was born on May 4, 1966, in New Orleans, Louisiana. He attended Booker T. Washington High School in New Orleans.

== College career ==
Thomas enrolled at the University of Houston to play college football for the Cougars. He was a four-year letterman from 1986 to 1989. He caught 13 career passes for 128 yards.

== Professional career ==
After going undrafted in the 1990 NFL draft, Thomas signed with the Tampa Bay Buccaneers on August 2, 1990. He was released on August 27 and signed to the practice squad on October 1. He was promoted to the active roster on October 26 and played in seven games as a reserve tight end during the 1990 season. Thomas was released again on December 21, 1990. He re-signed with the Buccaneers on March 6, 1991. He was placed on injured reserve on October 1 and underwent arthroscopic knee surgery. Thomas was activated on November 8. He appeared in six games for Tampa Bay in 1991, catching four passes for 55 yards on seven targets.

Thomas became a free agent after the 1991 season, and signed with the Buffalo Bills on March 17, 1992. He was released on August 31 but re-signed the next day. He was placed on injured reserve on September 5, where he spent the entire 1992 season. Thomas was released on August 24, 1993.
