= Mosi Tatupu =

American football player (1955–2010)

No. 30, 44
- Position: Running back

Personal information
- Born: April 26, 1955; Pago Pago, American Samoa
- Died: February 23, 2010 (aged 54); Attleboro, Massachusetts, U.S.
- Listed height: 6 ft 0 in (1.83 m)
- Listed weight: 227 lb (103 kg)

Career information
- High school: Punahou School (Honolulu, Hawaii, U.S.)
- College: USC
- NFL draft: 1978: 8th round, 216th overall pick

Career history

Playing
- New England Patriots (1978–1990); Los Angeles Rams (1991)

Coaching
- King Philip Regional HS (MA) (1995–2001) (head coach); Curry (2002–2007) (running backs)

Awards and highlights
- Pro Bowl (1986); New England Patriots All-1970s Team; New England Patriots All-1980s Team; New England Patriots 35th Anniversary Team; New England Patriots 50th Anniversary Team; National champion (1974)

Career NFL statistics
- Rushing yards: 2,415
- Rushing average: 3.9
- Rushing touchdowns: 18
- Stats at Pro Football Reference

Mosiula Faasuka Tatupu (April 26, 1955 – February 23, 2010) was an American professional football player who was a running back for 14 seasons in the National Football League (NFL). He played college football at the University of Southern California (USC). He played in the NFL as a running back and on special teams with New England Patriots from 1978 to 1990 and the Los Angeles Rams in 1991. He was elected to the Pro Bowl in 1986. He became a football coach after his playing career.

== Early life ==
Tatupu was a standout player at Punahou School in Honolulu, where he set many Hawaii state rushing records. He graduated in 1974.

== College career ==
Tatupu attended the University of Southern California, playing in the 1978 Hula Bowl and finished his career with 223 rushing attempts for 1,277 yards (5.73 yards per attempt avg.). The Mosi Tatupu Award, given from 1997 through 2006 to the top special teams player in college football by the Maui Quarterback Club and the Hula Bowl, bears his name.

== NFL career ==
Drafted in eighth round with the 215th overall pick of the 1978 NFL draft by the New England Patriots, Tatupu played fullback and became an ace on special teams. He rushed the ball 612 times for 2,415 yards and 18 touchdowns; in the 1983 season he led the league with 5.5 rushing yards per attempt. He caught 96 passes for 843 yards and two touchdowns for his career. His season high for rushing yards came in 1983 with 578 rushing yards and four touchdowns, while in 1984 he set a personal best with 16 catches for 159 yards. In 1987 against the Los Angeles Raiders, Tatupu threw a 15-yard touchdown to Tony Collins. However, the Patriots were terrible late in his career (they went 1–15 in his final season) and his playing time was sharply reduced in his final three years with the team; in one instance, Chris Berman mined humor from a New England loss by showing all 8 receptions by Tatupu in the game, because none of the catches produced a touchdown or even a first down.

Tatupu was used mostly on special teams kick coverage. He had seven kick returns for 56 yards in his career.

== Coaching career and death ==
Tatupu was the head coach at King Philip Regional High School in Wrentham, Massachusetts from 1995 to 2001, compiled a record of 29–43 in seven seasons. Former New England Patriots center, Pete Brock, was one of his assistant coaches. Tatupu was the running backs coach at Curry College, an NCAA Division III school in Milton, Massachusetts, from 2002 to 2007, serving under head coach Steve Nelson, a former teammate of Tatupu on the Patriots.

Tatupu died in Plainville, Massachusetts on February 23, 2010. The cause of death was a heart attack. In 2014, using brain tissue preserved from his 2010 autopsy, he was posthumously diagnosed with chronic traumatic encephalopathy by the CTE Center at Boston University School of Medicine. He is one of at least 345 NFL players to be diagnosed after death with this disease, which is caused by repeated hits to the head.

== Family ==
Tatupu's son, Lofa Tatupu, played linebacker at USC and for the Seattle Seahawks. Lofa was a teammate of Matt Hasselbeck, the son of Mosi's former Patriots teammate, Don Hasselbeck. His nephew, Joe Tuipala, was also an NFL linebacker from 1999 to 2005.

== In pop culture ==
In the Halloween 1992 episode of The Simpsons entitled "Treehouse of Horror III", Tatupu's name is used during the "King Homer" segment, which parodies the 1933 film King Kong. During the segment, the chief of Ape Island is shown to say "Mosi Tatupu, Mosi Tatupu", which in their language means "the blue-haired woman will make a fine sacrifice"—the "blue-haired woman" being Marge Simpson, who is playing Fay Wray's Ann Darrow to Homer's King Kong.

One of the most popular players to play for the New England Patriots, Tatupu had his own section of fans at Foxboro Stadium, "Mosi's Mooses," who all adorned moose heads and chanted his name throughout the game.
