= George Roudebush =

American football player (1894–1992)

- Born: January 25, 1894; Shaker Heights, Ohio, U.S.
- Died: February 29, 1992 (aged 98); Chardon, Ohio, U.S.
- Football career

Profile
- Positions: Fullback, tailback, quarterback

Personal information
- Listed height: 5 ft 11 in (1.80 m)
- Listed weight: 180 lb (82 kg)

Career information
- College: Denison

Career history
- Cincinnati Celts (1915–1916); Canton Bulldogs (1916); Camp Sherman (1917); Dayton Triangles (1919–1921)
- Military career
- Allegiance: United States
- Branch: U.S. Army
- Service years: 1917–1919
- Rank: Captain
- Conflicts: Western Front (World War I)

George Milton Roudebush (January 25, 1894 – February 29, 1992) was an American professional football player with the Canton Bulldogs, Cincinnati Celts of the "Ohio League", and the Dayton Triangles of the early National Football League (NFL). He was also a lawyer in Cleveland for 73 years.

== Biography ==
=== College ===
George attended Denison University where he earned all-Ohio Conference honors in football. He also lettered in basketball, baseball, and tennis. He graduated in 1915 with a Bachelor of Philosophy degree, followed by a Bachelor of Laws degree from the University of Cincinnati.

==== Forward pass ====
While Knute Rockne and Gus Dorais are credited as the first team to develop and use the forward pass, it upset the heavily favored Army team. The first forward pass was thrown by Roudebush a year earlier in 1912 to Dave Reese in a 3–3 tie against Wooster College and a 60–3 Denison victory over Otterbein College. George later stated that he used his experience of throwing stones and corncobs at hogs and chickens on his family farm to inspire his passing technique.

Prior to 1912, a forward pass could only be thrown 5 yards behind the line of scrimmage and travel no more than 20 yards. Denison, under coach Walter Livingston, relied heavily on the pass after the rules were changed to allow the ball travel an unlimited amount of distance and be thrown any distance behind the line of scrimmage. This allowed for teams to easily use the pass. The forward pass was used as far back as 1906 by Peggy Parratt of the Massillon Tigers; however, it was used more as a gimmick. Roudebush's use of the pass changed the way the pass was used. It was now a legitimate football strategy.

=== World War I ===
During World War I George served as a captain in the United States Army. He spent 18 months in France during the war.

While serving abroad, he helped organize the baseball tournament at the Inter-Allied Games.

=== Pro football ===
George started as a pro with the Cincinnati Celts in 1915. He also played for the Canton Bulldogs while Jim Thorpe was away playing baseball in 1916. When Thorpe returned to the team, George returned to playing for the Cincinnati Celts that same year. By this time George was working in a law office in Cleveland throughout the week. By Friday he would jump aboard a train for a weekend football game, taking along his own equipment in a duffel bag. Sometimes, to make the kickoff, he had to change into his football duds on the train. George's two seasons with the Dayton Triangles in 1920 and 1921 made him the oldest living NFL player from 1988 until his death in 1992. He also lined-up for the Triangles against the Columbus Panhandles in what may have been the very first NFL game.

==== 1916 Pine Village game ====
Probably the greatest moment in the Cincinnati Celts early existence came against a team from Pine Village, Indiana, team 1916. Pine Village consisted of only 300 residents, however it was the top team in Indiana before World War I, compiling a record of undefeated for 13 seasons. In 117 games, they’d only once been tied. Pine Village faced the Celts before a crowd of 2,500 people in Lafayette. With Pine Village leading Cincinnati 6–2, the Celts forced to punt. Roudebush then lined up behind the punter. Under the rules of the time, anyone lining up behind the punter was eligible to recover the kick as a free ball. After the ball was kicked, Roudebush, ran down the field. Pine Village not wanting to touch the ball, was unaware that Roudebush was eligible to recover it. Roudebush recovered the ball in the Pine Village endzone, giving the Celts a 9–6 victory.

=== Law practice ===
Roudebush returned to Ohio in 1919 and began his law practice with Snyder, Henry Thomsen, Ford, & Seagrave. He became a specialist in public finance and taxation. Later he was senior partner in Roudebush, Brown, Corlett & Ulrich which merged with Arter & Hadden in 1986. As chairman of the Chamber of Commerce committee on taxation in the 1930s, he favored repealing the enabling act which allowed cities to vote taxes for relief purposes.

=== Other sports ===
Roudebush was coach of the first college basketball team of St. Xavier College (later Xavier University) in 1915–16. Roudebush also played professional basketball in Dayton during the 1920s and officiated college football and baseball games. In 1929 he and Harold Lowe won Cleveland's tennis doubles championship. In 1975, he was inducted into the Denison University Athletic Hall of Fame.

== Family ==
Roudebush lived in the Shaker Heights neighborhood of Cleveland and was the son of George Milton and Rose Patchel Roudebush. On June 28, 1924, he married Harriette McCann. The couple had three children, Jane R. Daganhardt, George M. III, and Thomas. Roudebush died in Chardon, Ohio, in 1992 and was buried at Maple Grove Cemetery located in Licking County.
