= Kadeem Telfort =

American football player (born 1998)

Profile
- Position: Offensive tackle

Personal information
- Born: November 10, 1998 (age 27); Miami, Florida, U.S.
- Listed height: 6 ft 7 in (2.01 m)
- Listed weight: 322 lb (146 kg)

Career information
- High school: Booker T. Washington (Miami, Florida)
- College: Florida (2017); Garden City CC (2018); Highland CC (2019); UAB (2020–2022)
- NFL draft: 2023: undrafted

Career history
- Green Bay Packers (2023–2024); Miami Dolphins (2025)*
- * Offseason or practice squad member only

Awards and highlights
- First-team All-Conference USA (2022)

Career NFL statistics as of 2024
- Games played: 16
- Games started: 0
- Stats at Pro Football Reference

Kadeem Wysler Joseph Telfort (born November 10, 1998) is an American professional football offensive tackle. He played college football at Florida and UAB.

== Early life ==
Telfort grew up in Miami, Florida and attended Miami Norland Senior High School before transferring to Booker T. Washington Senior High School for his senior year. Telfort was a four-star rated recruit and originally decided to commit to play college football at the University of Miami during his sophomore year before instead committing to the University of Florida.

== College career ==
=== Florida ===
Telfort was suspended and away from the team during his true freshman season in 2017.

=== Garden City CC ===
During the 2018 season, Telfort played in and started six games.

=== Highland CC ===
Telfort was forced to sit out during the 2019 season since he transferred within the conference.

=== UAB ===
Telfort would decide to transfer to UAB. During the 2020 season, he appeared in all six games and tallied four starts, while also helping the team's running backs rush for 1,800 yards on the season with an average of 200.0 yards per game.

During the 2021 season, he played in and started all 13 games on the offensive line and also helped the running backs rush for 2,737 yards on the season.

During the 2022 season, he appeared in 12 games and started 11 of them on left tackle for the top offensive line unit in Conference USA. He helped the Blazers rush for 235.3 yards per game with rushing over 215 yards in 10 of their 13 games. He also was named a first team All-Conference USA.

== Professional career ==
Pre-draft measurables
Height	Weight	Arm length	Hand span	40-yard dash	10-yard split	20-yard split	20-yard shuttle	Three-cone drill	Vertical jump	Broad jump	Bench press
6 ft 7 1/2 in (2.02 m)	322 lb (146 kg)	36 in (0.91 m)	8 1/2 in (0.22 m)	5.43 s	1.89 s	3.14 s	5.10 s	8.70 s	24.5 in (0.62 m)	8 ft 0 in (2.44 m)	19 reps
All values from Pro Day

Telfort was selected by the Birmingham Stallions seventh overall in the 2023 USFL draft.

=== Green Bay Packers ===
On May 1, 2023, Telfort was signed to the Green Bay Packers as an undrafted free agent after going unselected in the 2023 NFL draft. He was waived on August 29, 2023, but was signed to the practice squad the next day. He was signed to a reserve/future contract on January 22, 2024.

On March 21, 2025, Telfort was re-signed by the Packers. He was released on August 26 as part of final roster cuts.

=== Miami Dolphins ===
On September 23, 2025, Telfort signed with the Miami Dolphins practice squad. Telfort was released by the Dolphins on January 9, 2026.
