= Joe Taibi =

American football player (born 1963)

No. 82
- Position: Defensive end

Personal information
- Born: February 22, 1963 (age 63); Pueblo, Colorado, U.S.
- Listed height: 6 ft 5 in (1.96 m)
- Listed weight: 265 lb (120 kg)

Career information
- High school: East (Pueblo)
- College: CSU Pueblo; Northern Colorado; Idaho
- NFL draft: 1987: undrafted

Career history
- Pueblo Crusaders (1987); New York Giants (1987)

Career NFL statistics
- Games played: 3
- Stats at Pro Football Reference

Joseph Paul Taibi (born February 22, 1963) is an American former professional football player who was a defensive end for one season in the National Football League (NFL) for the New York Giants. He played college football for the CSU Pueblo ThunderWolves (now CSU Pueblo), Northern Colorado Bears, and Idaho Vandals.

== Early life and education ==
Joe Taibi was born on February 22, 1963, in Pueblo, Colorado. He attended Pueblo East High School, before accepting a scholarship offer from Southern Colorado (now CSU Pueblo). He quit his first football season at Southern Colorado after three games, transferring to Northern Colorado. Before the start of his first Northern Colorado game, he ruptured his appendix and it required three surgeries. After the season, he transferred back to Southern Colorado, but the football program was discontinued before he could play in a game. He then joined University of Idaho, appearing in the starting lineup during the 1985 season. Taibi returned to Idaho for the 1986 season.

== Professional career ==
After going unselected in the 1987 NFL draft, Taibi played semi-professional football for the Pueblo Crusaders. Taibi was signed by the New York Giants during the NFL Players Association strike, in which each team signed replacement players. He appeared in three games with the Giants before being released.

Taibi was inducted into the Minor League Football Hall of Fame in 2001.
