= Dave Reese =

American football player (1892–1978)

No. 18, 10, 9
- Position: End

Personal information
- Born: November 19, 1892; Newman, Ohio, U.S.
- Died: June 26, 1978 (aged 85); Kettering, Ohio, U.S.
- Listed height: 6 ft 0 in (1.83 m)
- Listed weight: 176 lb (80 kg)

Career information
- College: Denison

Career history

Playing
- Dayton Triangles (1920–1923)

Operations
- Mid-American Conference (1946–1964) (Commissioner)

Career statistics
- Receptions: 1
- Receiving TDs: 1
- Games played: 34
- Stats at Pro Football Reference

David E. Reese (November 19, 1892 – June 26, 1978) was an American football end who played four seasons with the Dayton Triangles of the National Football League (NFL). He played college football at Denison University. Reese was the first commissioner of the Mid-American Conference (MAC), serving from 1946 to 1964.
