= Tiny Turner =

American football player (1895–1965)

Profile
- Position: Guard

Personal information
- Born: April 6, 1895; Columbus, Ohio, U.S.
- Died: October 19, 1965 (aged 70)
- Listed height: 6 ft 0 in (1.83 m)
- Listed weight: 195 lb (88 kg)

Career information
- College: Ohio State

Career history
- Canton Bulldogs (1919); Dayton Triangles (1920)

Career statistics
- Games played: 2
- Games started: 2
- Stats at Pro Football Reference

Irwin McDowell "Tiny" Turner (April 6, 1895 – October 19, 1965) was an American football player. He played college football at Ohio State University in 1916. He then played one game of professional football at center for the Canton Bulldogs in 1919. In 1920, with the formation of the American Professional Football Association (APFA), Turner played two games at guard for the Dayton Triangles.
