= Glenn Tidd =

American football player (1894–1970)

Profile
- Positions: Center, guard, tackle, back

Personal information
- Born: April 23, 1894; Jamestown, Ohio, U.S.
- Died: October 3, 1970 (aged 76); Dayton, Ohio, U.S.
- Listed height: 5 ft 11 in (1.80 m)
- Listed weight: 202 lb (92 kg)

Career information
- High school: Springfield (OH)

Career history
- Dayton Triangles (1916, 1919–1924)

Career statistics
- Games: 31

Glenn E. Tidd (April 23, 1894 – October 3, 1970) was an American football player.

Tidd was born in Jamestown, Ohio, in 1894 and attended high school in Springfield, Ohio. He played professional football as a center, guard, tackle, and back for the Dayton Triangles in 1916 and from 1919 to 1924. He served in the military during World War I, returned to the Triangles after the war, and was with the Triangles in 1920 when they became an inaugural member of the National Football League.

At the end of the 1920 season, Tidd was selected as a first-team guard on the first All-Star Professional Eleven. In announcing the selection, Addie Adams of the Akron Evening Times described Tidd as a "big hulk of beef and brawn" and added:

Tidd is also a wonder. A big man, he is able to break thru the line on almost every play, ripping big holes for his own backfield and making it uncomfortable for the opposition.

He appeared in 31 NFL games, five as a starter, from 1920 to 1924, scored two touchdowns, and tallied one interception. He also appeared in 14 games for the Triangles prior to the formation of the NFL.

Tidd died in 1970 at age 76 in Dayton.
