= Dutch Thiele =

American football player (1892–1986)

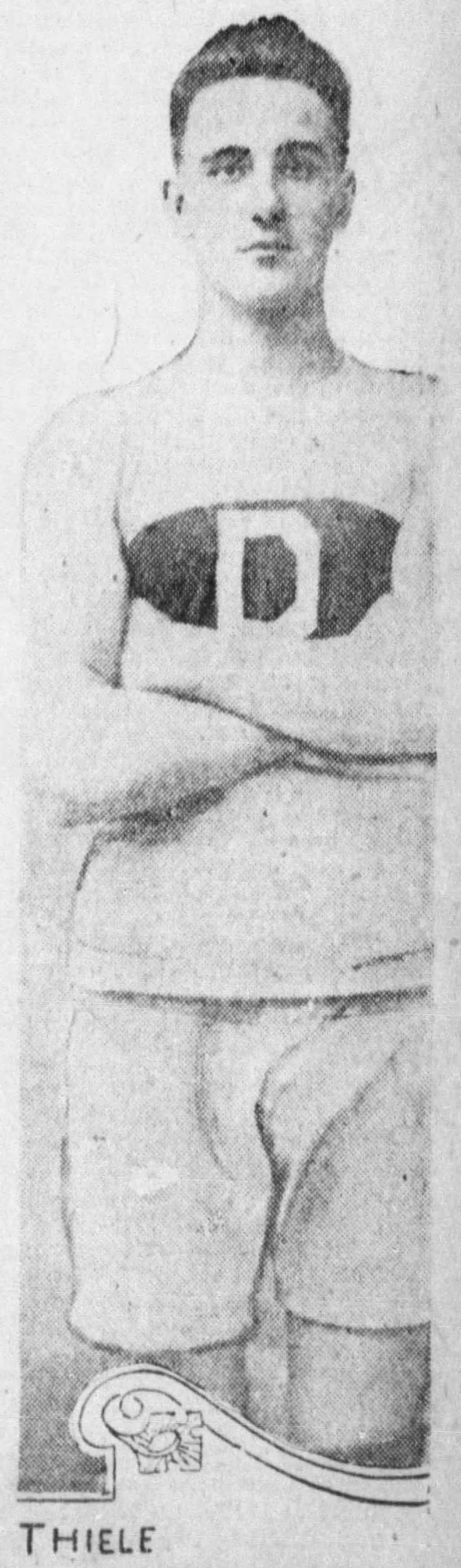
- Dutch Thiele, 1918

Profile
- Positions: End, center

Personal information
- Born: November 14, 1892; Dayton, Ohio, U.S.
- Died: July 11, 1986 (aged 93); Dayton, Ohio, U.S.
- Listed height: 6 ft 1 in (1.85 m)
- Listed weight: 195 lb (88 kg)

Career information
- High school: Stivers (OH)
- College: Denison

Career history
- Dayton Triangles (1920–1923)

Career statistics
- Games: 31

Carl Louis "Dutch" Thiele (November 14, 1892 – July 11, 1986) was an American football player. He played four seasons in the National Football League (NFL) from 1920 to 1923.

== Early life ==
A native of Dayton, Ohio, he attended Stivers High School where he was a multi-sport star. He then attended Denison University where he was an All-Ohio player in both football and basketball. Following the United States' entry into World War I, he enlisted in the aviation corps and was called to report for active duty in February 1918.

== Professional football ==
He then played professional football as an end for the Dayton Triangles in the NFL. He appeared in 31 NFL games, 28 as a starter, from 1920 to 1923. He also played at the center position for the Triangles in 1916 and 1917, prior to the formation of the NFL. He was described as "one of the best all-round athletes ever developed in this city."

== Later life ==
After retiring from football, Thiele went into the automobile business. He died in 1986 in Dayton.
