= Cincinnati Celts =

Defunct American football team

Logo

General information
- Founded: 1910
- Folded: 1923
- Stadium: Traveling Team
- Headquartered: Cincinnati, Ohio, United States
- Colors: Black, Celts gold, white

Personnel
- Head coach: Mel Doherty

Team history
- Cincinnati Celts (1910–1923)

League / conference affiliations
- Ohio League (1910–1919); Independent (1920, 1922–1923); American Professional Football Association (1921)

The Cincinnati Celts (pronounced with a hard C) was the first professional football team to play in Cincinnati, Ohio. The team played in the unofficial "Ohio League" and the American Professional Football Association (renamed the National Football League in 1922). The Celts were a traveling team, playing all of their APFA games in other cities' stadia. In its only season in the APFA, 1921, the team had a record of 1–3. For the entire span of the team's existence, the Celts were coached by Mel Doherty, who was also the team's center.

== History ==
=== Origins ===
The Celts were established in 1910 as a semi-pro team made up primarily of players from Miami University in nearby Oxford. During the first 10 years of their existence, the team flourished while playing numerous semi-pro teams from Ohio. An early member of the squad, George Roudebush, referred to the team as being run “by a bunch of wild Irishmen.” In 1914, Lou Partlow played for the Celts.

==== 1916 Pine Village game ====
One of the greatest moments in the team's early existence came against a team from Pine Village, Indiana, in 1916. While Pine Village consisted of only 300 residents, it was the top team in Indiana before World War I, compiling a record of 12 undefeated seasons. In 117 games, the team had only one tie-game finish. Pine Village faced the Celts before a crowd of 2,500 people in nearby Lafayette. With Pine Village leading Cincinnati 6–2, the Celts were forced to punt. George Roudebush then lined up behind the punter. Under the rules of the time, anyone lining up behind the punter was eligible to recover the kick as a free ball. After the ball was kicked, Roudebush ran down the field. Pine Village, not wanting to touch the ball, was unaware that Roudebush was eligible to recover it. Roudebush recovered the ball in the Pine Village end zone, giving the Celts a 9–6 victory.

=== NFL ===
The Celts were not initially invited to join the new American Professional Football Association (APFA), later known as the National Football League, when the circuit was established in 1920. The team accepted an invitation the following year, but proved unequal to the task, being outscored 117–14 in their only four league games. The team's only two touchdowns, and sole victory, came during a 14–0 shutout of the Muncie Flyers. The Celts also faced the 1920 APFA champion Akron Pros, Cleveland Tigers, and the Evansville Crimson Giants, losing handily in each contest. The Celts finally withdrew from the league in 1922, just prior to it being renamed the National Football League. For many years, the NFL record book listed the Celts as having an APFA record of 0–8–0. After reviewing records from the era, the NFL corrected the standings.

The team's finances were also troubling. Game attendance for the Celts never reached above 2,500 spectators. As a result of this and other financial issues, the Celts were unable to pay the nominal league fees. The Celts continued as an amateur team until 1923.

== Season-by-season ==
Year	W	L	T	Finish	Coach
1921	1	3	0	13th	Mel Doherty
