= 1980 Tampa Bay Buccaneers season =

NFL team season

- Owner: Hugh Culverhouse
- Head coach: John McKay
- Home stadium: Tampa Stadium

Results
- Record: 5–10–1
- Division place: 4th NFC Central
- Playoffs: Did not qualify
- All-Pros: DE Lee Roy Selmon (second team)
- Pro Bowlers: 3: TE Jimmie Giles; LB Dave Lewis; DE Lee Roy Selmon
- Team MVP: QB Doug Williams

The 1980 Tampa Bay Buccaneers season was the franchise's 5th season in the National Football League (NFL), the 5th playing their home games at Tampa Stadium and the 5th under head coach John McKay. They failed to improve on their 10–6 record from 1979 and finished 5–10–1.

It began with great confidence in the wake of their surprise NFC championship appearance of the previous season. After scoring a playoff win in only their fourth year, the Buccaneers became the model franchise upon which the NBA expansion Dallas Mavericks adopted their building plan. A 3–1 preseason and victories in their first two regular-season games, including an NFC championship rematch against the Los Angeles Rams in the Buccaneers' Monday Night Football debut, gave an early impression of the team as a force that had arrived. However, the confidence was lost as the offense underachieved, while opponents seemed to have solved the Buccaneers' 3–4 defense. A rash of defensive injuries, beginning with the Rams game, required playing many inexperienced players who proved not to be as ready as expected. Losses accumulated as opponents repeatedly took advantage of the Buccaneers' "bend but don't break" defensive strategy of preventing big plays while allowing small gains.

In week 6 they recorded their first, and as of 2025, only tie in their history, 14–14 against the Green Bay Packers. Bright spots included Doug Williams setting numerous Buccaneer passing records while leading the NFC in combined yardage, and a strong draft class.

The season quickly came to be a struggle. As teams began to open up their passing games in response to league rule changes, the Buccaneer defense was exposed as a superior run defense that had difficulty against strong passing attacks. Several quarterbacks had career-best days against Tampa Bay during the season. They also had trouble maintaining consistency in the face of large personnel turnovers, beginning with the preseason trade of Jeris White, and continuing through the injury-plagued regular season. The most serious injury was to Randy Crowder, whose dislocated knee in week 2 ended his career and nearly required amputation. The offense improved through the season, with Doug Williams continuing to mature as a quarterback, and rookie receiver Kevin House developing as a reliable target. As the season wore on, the team began to reflect coach John McKay's volatile personality, frequently arguing with and criticizing officials, while gaining a reputation as a team of complainers. The team's lack of enthusiasm was noticeable to McKay, who observed that the team was not playing the way they had the previous year. As fan frustration grew, "Throw McKay in the Bay" signs began to reappear at home games. Because no other team was dominant in the NFC Central, the Buccaneers stayed alive in the division race until a second-half collapse against the Minnesota Vikings in week 14 guaranteed that they would finish the season with a losing record. McKay later described the season as feeling "cursed".

== Offseason ==
Only one day after their playoff loss to the Los Angeles Rams, the Buccaneers began preparations for the next season. Disappointed with the performance of the receivers during the Rams game, John McKay hinted that some of them would not be returning. Ex-Cincinnati Bengals assistant and Green Bay Packers All-Pro receiver Boyd Dowler was added to the staff as a receivers coach, and tasked with improving the performance of Gordon Jones, who was considered to have been a draft bust. All other assistant coaches were retained and given three-year contract extensions. McKay was given a five-year extension and was promised lifetime employment by owner Hugh Culverhouse, who backed up his words by adding a clause to his will to guarantee such. The club honored receiver Morris Owens' request for a trade, sending him along with fellow demoted former starter Darryl Carlton to the Washington Redskins for future draft picks. Another receiver, coach McKay's son Johnny, retired shortly after the draft. The team also added former Oregon State head coach and McKay associate Craig Fertig to their staff as a scout.

=== NFL draft ===
1980 Tampa Bay Buccaneers draft
Round	Pick	Player	Position	College	Notes
1	22	Ray Snell	G	Wisconsin	
2	49	Kevin House	WR	Southern Illinois	
3	76	Scot Brantley	LB	Florida	
4	102	Larry Flowers	DB	Texas Tech	
7	186	Jim Leonard	G	Santa Clara	
8	213	Derrick Goddard	DB	Drake	
9	240	Gerald Carter	WR	Texas A&M	
10	267	Andy Hawkins	LB	Texas A&I	
10	275	Brett Davis	RB	UNLV	
11	299	Terry Jones	DE	Central State (OK)	
12	326	Gene Coleman	DB	Miami (FL)	
Made roster † Pro Football Hall of Fame * Made at least one Pro Bowl during career

==== Draft trades ====
Starting cornerback Jeris White was traded to the Redskins for a fourth-round draft pick and their leading receiver, Danny Buggs. The trade was officially motivated by salary issues, as McKay did not like having to give up White, and did not expect Buggs to make the Buccaneers' squad. Observers did however note a pattern in that White was the latest of several highly-vocal players to be traded away, a tendency that had been pointed out as far back as Ira Gordon's release during the 1976 preseason. The draft pick was used to select Texas Tech defensive back Larry Flowers, who was released before the end of preseason. The Buccaneers' original fourth-round pick was traded to the San Diego Chargers for guard Booker Brown, who was waived in preseason. Their fifth-round pick had been traded to the Oakland Raiders for quarterback Mike Rae. Their sixth-round pick went the Cincinnati Bengals in return for running back Tony Davis. The Buccaneers' second tenth-round selection came from the Chargers.

==== Draft selections ====
Seeing Ray Snell available with the Buccaneers' choice, McKay rushed to select him, believing him to be one of the fastest guards in football. Florida linebacker Scot Brantley was considered to be somewhat of a gamble, because it was believed at one point that a concussion received during his senior year meant that playing football could be life-threatening. Although the 1980 draft was not considered to be particularly deep, McKay indicated that as many as seven of the draftees, including those picked low in the seventh- through tenth-rounds, had good prospects of making the team.

=== Preseason ===
In an effort to improve the receiving corps, the Buccaneers signed ten wide receivers to compete for the five available spots on the team. Defensive line became a concern, as Reggie Lewis walked out of camp, saying that he had lost his desire to play football. The club never acknowledged his absence, simply declining to answer questions about his progress until reporters noticed several days later that he was missing. He returned less than a week later and was welcomed back by McKay, who was concerned with the team's depth on the defensive line and saw Lewis as a valuable backup and a potential starter. Nose tackle Bill Kollar sprained an ankle in an exhibition against the St. Louis Cardinals while already suffering from back problems, and the arthritis in defensive end Wally Chambers's knee kept him out of preseason games. The frequently-injured Chambers, although still capable of great play when healthy, was felt by the staff to be a divisive force with a suspect work ethic and was waived without having played a single down in preseason. The concerns about depth led the Buccaneers to trade two draft picks to the Dallas Cowboys for their starting defensive tackle Dave Stalls. McKay felt that the general improvement in team talent was such that there would be players cut in preseason who would have made the team and done well in previous seasons. The preseason saw three more original Buccaneers depart from the roster: George Ragsdale, Dave Green, and Jimmy DuBose. Ragsdale was placed on injured reserve, but McKay indicated that he would not be back. Green lost the punting job to Tom Blanchard. DuBose, still unable to show his form of two seasons prior, before he suffered a severe knee injury, was traded to the Dolphins (who needed a fullback, having lost Larry Csonka in a contract dispute) along with a second-round draft pick for cornerback Norris Thomas and running back Gary Davis. Dana Nafziger was also placed on injured reserve, expected to miss the season. Garo Yepremian, who had set an NFL record the previous season by kicking 20 consecutive successful field goals, was signed to replace Neil O'Donoghue and became the fourth ex-Dolphin acquired by the Buccaneers in a two-week span. Despite a 3–1 record in preseason play, McKay reported being "unimpressed" with his team's performance.

== Regular season ==
The Buccaneers made their Monday Night Football debut in a week 2 game against the reigning NFC Champions, the Los Angeles Rams in a rematch of the previous season's NFC Championship Game, which the Rams won 9–0. The ABC-TV broadcast crew of Howard Cosell, Frank Gifford and Fran Tarkenton singled out several individual Buccaneers for praise, although the game itself was a struggle of defenses and errors that the crew described as "dumb" and "dull". Injuries became a serious issue almost immediately, with three of the team's defensive starters sidelined after the Rams game. The season-ending injury to Randy Crowder in that game required that the Buccaneers replace him with Dave Logan, a 12th-round draft pick of the previous year who was seen as having great potential but practically no experience. The injuries on defense came at a particularly bad time, as the team needed the defense to compensate for its slumping offense. The offense was hampered by a preseason injury to fullback Johnny Davis, which left McKay concerned about wearing out Ricky Bell by playing him at fullback. After five games, the Buccaneers found themselves averaging 110 rushing yards per game, which was forty yards less per game than in the previous season, and only three yards better than in their winless 1976 season. The Tampa Bay staff was mystified at why this should be, as the replacement of guard Greg Horton with converted defensive lineman Gene Sanders and his greater speed was expected to have improved the team's outside running game. Former starting quarterback Mike Rae, having been displaced by Chuck Fusina during the preseason as Doug Williams' backup, was placed on injured reserve after three games. His roster spot was filled by blocking tight end Conrad Rucker, who was in turn later replaced by Tony Samuels. The team began to show signs of frustration during a week 5 game against the Chicago Bears, with players arguing with officials and opponents and tackling with excessive violence. Bears safety Doug Plank reported that several of the Buccaneers were preoccupied with seeking revenge over Plank's excessive but unpenalized hit on Jimmie Giles, a hit for which Plank was later fined by the NFL. A rash of mental mistakes and overall poor performance by the receivers led to midseason changes in which Larry Mucker was waived, with the intention of replacing him with Gerald Carter, a rookie who had impressed in training camp but had not made the final cut. Although Carter could not clear waivers, being claimed by the Jets, San Francisco 49ers receiver Mike Shumann came available, and promptly contributed reliable play.

After a three-game winless streak marked by uncharacteristic defensive collapses, McKay accused the team of "living in the past". At a press conference, McKay drew a diagram showing how a play had failed because players had not run it the same way they practiced it, and wrote an explanation at the bottom: "Mental Don't Give a Bleep". Injury problems worsened, as by the end of October starting guards Sanders and Greg Roberts were both on injured reserve. League rules allowed teams to activate a maximum of three players per season off of injured reserve, but the Buccaneers had already activated two and intended to save the third for Mike Rae in case of an injury to a quarterback. Although the staff would not publicize players' personal problems, it was later revealed that several players experienced diminished performance due to excessive drug use. David Lewis, Greg Roberts, and Cecil Johnson were identified as being among the half-dozen or so players involved. This became the motivation for a series of surprise trades in the 1982 offseason.

The offense began to improve at midseason, but the defense found it difficult to cope with new rules intended to open up the passing game. It was also alleged that the Buccaneers' first-place schedule was a factor, as the defensive strategy of preventing the big play while allowing small gains was more effective against lower-quality teams that were more mistake-prone and less capable of taking advantage of the opportunities offered them. McKay pointed out a noticeable lack of enthusiasm, saying that players were standing around on the field as though waiting to be interviewed. The season ended with a three-game losing streak, with McKay unable to explain why the season had gone the way it did. Although he still felt confident in the defensive personnel, he called the running backs the worst blockers he'd ever been associated with. He for the first time gave Ricky Bell less than his full support, stating that the team had not gotten their money's worth out of Bell during the season.

=== Schedule ===
Week	Date	Opponent	Result	Record	Venue	Attendance	Recap
1	September 7	at Cincinnati Bengals	**W** 17–12	1–0	Riverfront Stadium	35,551	Recap
2	September 11	Los Angeles Rams	**W** 10–9	2–0	Tampa Stadium	66,576	Recap
3	September 21	at Dallas Cowboys	**L** 17–28	2–1	Texas Stadium	62,750	Recap
4	September 28	Cleveland Browns	**L** 27–34	2–2	Tampa Stadium	65,540	Recap
5	October 6	at **Chicago Bears**	**L** 0–23	2–3	Soldier Field	61,350	Recap
6	October 12	**Green Bay Packers**	**T** 14–14 (OT)	2–3–1	Tampa Stadium	64,854	Recap
7	October 19	at Houston Oilers	**L** 14–20	2–4–1	Houston Astrodome	48,167	Recap
8	October 26	at San Francisco 49ers	**W** 24–23	3–4–1	Candlestick Park	51,925	Recap
9	November 2	New York Giants	**W** 30–13	4–4–1	Tampa Stadium	68,256	Recap
10	November 9	Pittsburgh Steelers	**L** 21–24	4–5–1	Tampa Stadium	71,636	Recap
11	November 16	at **Minnesota Vikings**	**L** 30–38	4–6–1	Metropolitan Stadium	46,032	Recap
12	November 23	**Detroit Lions**	**L** 10–24	4–7–1	Tampa Stadium	64,976	Recap
13	November 30	at **Green Bay Packers**	**W** 20–17	5–7–1	Milwaukee County Stadium	54,225	Recap
14	December 7	**Minnesota Vikings**	**L** 10–21	5–8–1	Tampa Stadium	65,649	Recap
15	December 14	at **Detroit Lions**	**L** 14–27	5–9–1	Pontiac Silverdome	77,098	Recap
16	December 20	**Chicago Bears**	**L** 13–14	5–10–1	Tampa Stadium	55,298	Recap

Note: Intra-division opponents are in bold text.

=== Standings ===
NFC Central
	W	L	T	PCT	DIV	CONF	PF	PA	STK
^{(3)} Minnesota Vikings	9	7	0	.563	5–3	8–4	317	308	L1
Detroit Lions	9	7	0	.563	5–3	9–5	334	272	W2
Chicago Bears	7	9	0	.438	5–3	7–5	304	264	W1
Tampa Bay Buccaneers	5	10	1	.344	1–6–1	4–7–1	271	341	L3
Green Bay Packers	5	10	1	.344	3–4–1	4–7–1	231	371	L4

=== 1980 roster ===
Tampa Bay Buccaneers 1980 roster
**Quarterbacks**: 14 Chuck Fusina; 12 **Doug Williams**; **Running backs**: 42 **Ricky Bell**; 36 Rick Berns; 28 Gary Davis; 38 **Johnny Davis**; 27 Tony Davis; 43 **Jerry Eckwood**; **Wide receivers**: 87 Gerald Carter; 81 **Isaac Hagins**; 89 Kevin House; 84 **Gordon Jones**; 82 Mike Shumann; **Tight ends**: 88 **Jimmie Giles**; 86 Jim Obradovich	**Offensive linemen**: 69 Darrell Austin T; 73 **Charley Hannah** RT; 62 Jim Leonard C; 75 **Dave Reavis** LT; 74 Gene Sanders G; 72 **Ray Snell** RG; 50 **Steve Wilson** C; 68 **George Yarno** LG; **Defensive linemen**: 77 **Bill Kollar** LDE; 79 Reggie Lewis DE; 76 **Dave Logan** NT; 78 Bruce Radford DE; 63 **Lee Roy Selmon** RDE; 65 Dave Stalls DE	**Linebackers**: 52 Scot Brantley ILB; 55 Aaron Brown ILB; 59 Andy Hawkins OLB; 56 **Cecil Johnson** ROLB; 57 **Dave Lewis** LOLB; 58 **Dewey Selmon** LILB; 54 **Richard Wood** RILB; **Defensive backs**: 34 Cedric Brown FS; 20 Neal Colzie SS; 33 Mark Cotney SS; 25 **Curtis Jordan** LCB; 46 Danny Reece FS; 41 Norris Thomas CB; 40 **Mike Washington** RCB; **Special teams**: 16 **Tom Blanchard** P; 1 **Garo Yepremian** K	**Reserve lists**: 71 Randy Crowder NT (IR); 51 Dana Nafziger LB (IR); 15 Mike Rae QB (IR); 23 George Ragsdale RB (IR); 61 Greg Roberts RG (IR); 80 Tony Samuels TE (IR); 19 Bo Taylor WR (Left squad); rookies in italics **starters in boldface**

== Coaching staff ==
Tampa Bay Buccaneers 1980 coaching staff
Front office: Owner – Hugh Culverhouse; Head coaches: Head coach – John McKay; Offensive coaches: Quarterbacks – Bill Nelsen; Receivers – Boyd Dowler; Running backs – George Chaump; Offensive line – Bill Johnson	Defensive coaches: Defensive coordinator/linebackers – Tom Bass; Defensive line/chief assistant – Abe Gibron; Secondary – Wayne Fontes; Special teams coaches: Special teams coordinator – Phil Krueger

== Game summaries ==
=== Week 1: at Cincinnati Bengals ===
Week 1: Tampa Bay Buccaneers at Cincinnati Bengals – Game summary

Quarter	1	2	3	4	Total
Buccaneers	0	10	0	7	17
Bengals	3	0	2	7	12

at Riverfront Stadium, Cincinnati, Ohio

- Date: September 7
- Game time: 1:00 p.m. EDT
- Game weather: 72 °F (22 °C)
- Game attendance: 35,551
- TV announcers (CBS): Curt Gowdy and Hank Stram
- Box score

Game information

First quarter

- CIN – Ian Sunter 35-yard field goal. Bengals 3–0.

Second quarter

- TB – Garo Yepremian 19–yard field goal. Tied 3–3.
- TB – Jimmie Giles 32-yard pass from Doug Williams (Garo Yepremian kick). Buccaneers 10–3.

Third quarter

- CIN – Tom Blanchard run out of own end zone. Buccaneers 10–5.

Fourth quarter

- CIN – Dan Ross 3-yard pass from Jack Thompson (Ian Sunter kick). Bengals 12–10.
- TB – Jimmie Giles 15-yard pass from Doug Williams (Garo Yepremian kick). Buccaneers 17–12.

Top passers

- TB – Doug Williams – 11/21, 155 yards, 2 TD
- CIN – Jack Thompson – 6/21, 47 yards, TD, INT

Top rushers

- TB – Jerry Eckwood – 19 rushes, 43 yards
- CIN – Archie Griffin – 18 rushes, 68 yards

Top receivers

- TB – Jimmie Giles – 3 receptions, 62 yards, 2 TD
- CIN – Dan Ross – 2 receptions, 22 yards, TD

The Buccaneers faced a Cincinnati Bengals team missing quarterback Ken Anderson, who injured his leg during the final preseason game. Buccaneer defensive backs Mike Washington and Cedric Brown were expected to see limited action, to avoid aggravating their preseason injuries on Riverfront Stadium's artificial turf. The game was played in a downpour, with coach McKay at one point ordering punter Tom Blanchard to run into the end zone and give up a safety, rather than risk a mistake that might lead to a Bengals touchdown. Randy Crowder sacked Bengals quarterback Jack Thompson deep in Bengals territory twice in one second-quarter series. Doug Williams took advantage of the resulting good field position to throw a 32-yard touchdown to Jimmie Giles shortly before the end of the half. Blanchard fumbled the snap on what could have been a game-winning field goal late in the fourth quarter, but the error was nullified when Bengals punter Pat McInally's fumbled punt snap gave the Buccaneers possession at the Bengals' five-yard line. Williams threw a 15-yard touchdown to Giles to clinch the game.

=== Week 2: vs Los Angeles Rams ===
Week 2: Los Angeles Rams at Tampa Bay Buccaneers – Game summary

Quarter	1	2	3	4	Total
Rams	0	3	3	3	9
Buccaneers	0	3	0	7	10

at Tampa Stadium, Tampa, Florida

- Date: September 11
- Game time: 9:00 p.m. EDT
- Game weather: 76 °F (24 °C)
- Game attendance: 66,576
- TV announcers (ABC): Frank Gifford and Howard Cosell
- Box score

Game information

First quarter

- No scoring plays

Second quarter

- LA – Frank Corral 43-yard field goal. Rams 3–0.
- TB – Garo Yepremian 43-yard field goal. Tied 3–3.

Third quarter

- LA – Frank Corral 32-yard field goal. Rams 6–3.

Fourth quarter

- LA – Frank Corral 27-yard field goal. Rams 9–3.
- TB – Doug Williams 1-yard run (Garo Yepremian kick). Buccaneers 10–9.

Top passers

- LA – Vince Ferragamo – 17/29, 191 yards, 4 INT
- TB – Doug Williams – 10/23, 97 yards, INT

Top rushers

- LA – Jewerl Thomas – 7 rushes, 64 yards
- TB – Jerry Eckwood – 16 rushes, 60 yards

Top receivers

- LA – Billy Waddy – 5 receptions, 88 yards
- TB – Jimmie Giles – 3 receptions, 33 yards

The rematch of the previous season's NFC Championship game occurred in a special Thursday-night edition of Monday Night Football, for which the teams only had three days to prepare. The Rams were mistake-prone, but nonetheless able to maintain a 9–3 lead over the Buccaneers, until a pass interference penalty on defensive back Ivory Sully gave the Buccaneers the ball at the Rams' 11-yard line with 1:21 left to play. The 41-yard penalty was Tampa Bay's longest offensive play of the game. Doug Williams dove for a touchdown on the next series, and Garo Yepremian's extra point gave the Buccaneers the lead. Norris Thomas ended the Rams' final threat by intercepting a Vince Ferragamo pass. The Buccaneers were fortunate to have remained in position for the victory, as they only managed 17 yards of offense in the first quarter and did not get a first down until halfway through the second quarter. Earlier Los Angeles scoring opportunities were defeated by penalties and interceptions. Speculation during the week had been that the Rams might come in disorganized, due to several veterans having just rejoined the team after offseason contract disputes, and several others being disgruntled over salaries. Ferragamo, starting in place of the injured Pat Haden, had missed practice earlier in the week and threatened not to make the trip to Tampa for the game. The Buccaneers suffered several injuries, the most serious being to nose tackle Randy Crowder, who suffered a knee injury during the second half that required surgery and ended his career.

=== Week 3: at Dallas Cowboys ===
Week 3: Tampa Bay Buccaneers at Dallas Cowboys – Game summary

Quarter	1	2	3	4	Total
Buccaneers	7	10	0	0	17
Cowboys	7	7	7	7	28

at Texas Stadium, Irving, Texas

- Date: September 21
- Game time: 4:00 p.m. EDT/3:00 p.m. CDT
- Game weather: 86 °F (30 °C)
- Game attendance: 62,750
- Referee: Chuck Heberling
- TV announcers (CBS): Pat Summerall and Tom Brookshier
- Box score

Game information

First quarter

- DAL – Butch Johnson 28-yard pass from Danny White (Rafael Septien kick). Cowboys 7–0.
- TB – Doug Williams 11-yard run (Garo Yepremian kick). Tied 7–7.

Second quarter

- TB – Garo Yepremian 22-yard field goal. Buccaneers 10–7.
- TB – Jimmie Giles 49-yard pass from Doug Williams (Garo Yepremian kick). Buccaneers 17–7.
- DAL – Billy Joe DuPree 9-yard pass from Danny White (Rafael Septien kick). Buccaneers 17–14.

Third quarter

- DAL – Robert Newhouse 2-yard run (Rafael Septien kick). Cowboys 21–17.

Fourth quarter

- DAL – Billy Joe DuPree 9-yard pass from Danny White (Rafael Septien kick). Cowboys 28–17.

Top passers

- TB – Doug Williams – 17/30, 258 yards, TD, 2 INT
- DAL – Danny White – 24/33, 244 yards, 3 TD

Top rushers

- TB – Ricky Bell – 15 rushes, 91 yards
- DAL – Tony Dorsett – 20 rushes, 100 yards

Top receivers

- TB – Jimmie Giles – 4 receptions, 105 yards, TD
- DAL – Tony Hill – 5 receptions, 72 yards

In a reversal of the previous two weeks, the Buccaneers set several team offensive records, but were unable to come away with a win as their defense was unable to stop the Dallas offense. Doug Williams had his best day yet, completing 17 of 30 passes for 258 yards while rushing seven times for 77 yards and a touchdown. Williams' 335 total yards, the team's 442 total yards, and the team's 312 first-half yards all set new team records. Cowboys quarterback Danny White threw for 244 yards and three touchdowns, and Tony Dorsett carried 20 times for 100 yards. After Jimmie Giles beat Dallas safeties Charlie Waters and Dennis Thurman for a second-quarter touchdown, Waters and Thurman took turns intercepting Williams in the second half. Waters' interception led to the Cowboys' game-winning drive, while Thurman's interception ended any hopes of a Buccaneer comeback. Missing three starters, the defense was unable to put any pressure on White. A fourth starter, Cecil Johnson, was lost in the second half.

=== Week 4: vs Cleveland Browns ===
Week 4: Cleveland Browns at Tampa Bay Buccaneers – Game summary

Quarter	1	2	3	4	Total
Browns	0	17	7	10	34
Buccaneers	6	7	0	14	27

at Tampa Stadium, Tampa, Florida

- Date: September 28
- Game time: 1:00 p.m. EDT
- Game weather: 81 °F (27 °C)
- Game attendance: 65,540
- Box score

Game information

First quarter

- TB – Garo Yepremian 37-yard field goal. Buccaneers 3–0.
- TB – Garo Yepremian 35-yard field goal. Buccaneers 6–0.

Second quarter

- CLE – Don Cockroft 35-yard field goal. Buccaneers 6–3.
- TB – Gordon Jones 41-yard pass from Doug Williams (Garo Yepremian kick). Buccaneers 13–3.
- CLE – Charles White 8-yard run (Don Cockroft kick). Buccaneers 13–10.
- CLE – Calvin Hill 3-yard pass from Brian Sipe (Don Cockroft kick). Browns 17–13.

Third quarter

- CLE – Ricky Feacher 13-yard pass from Brian Sipe (Don Cockroft kick). Browns 24–13.

Fourth quarter

- CLE – Calvin Hill 43-yard pass from Brian Sipe (Don Cockroft kick). Browns 31–13.
- TB – Gordon Jones 3-yard pass from Doug Williams (Garo Yepremian kick). Browns 31–20.
- CLE – Don Cockroft 36-yard field goal. Browns 34–20.
- TB – Jerry Eckwood 7-yard pass from Doug Williams (Garo Yepremian kick). Browns 34–27.

Top passers

- CLE – Brian Sipe – 22/32, 318 yards, 3 TD, INT
- TB – Doug Williams – 30/56, 343 yards, 3 TD, 2 INT

Top rushers

- CLE – Mike Pruitt – 15 rushes, 48 yards
- TB – Isaac Hagins – 1 rush, 26 yards

Top receivers

- CLE – Reggie Rucker – 4 receptions, 79 yards
- TB – Jerry Eckwood – 10 receptions, 101 yards, TD

Cleveland Browns quarterback Brian Sipe set a team record by completing 13 consecutive passes en route to passing for 318 yards, the highest total that Tampa Bay had allowed to date. He beat a Buccaneer blitz to hit former Dallas great Calvin Hill for a touchdown that gave the Browns a 30–13 lead. Despite going into the final two minutes with a two-touchdown deficit, the Buccaneers continued to rally, scoring on a 7-yard pass to Jerry Eckwood with 45 seconds left. They were able to recover the ensuing onside kick, but were not able to score again in the remaining time. Doug Williams completed 30 passes for 337 yards. Two first-quarter touchdown opportunities ended with penalties, forcing the Buccaneers to settle for field goals which provided the margin of defeat. Injuries again were a factor, as the inexperienced Dave Logan aided a second-quarter Cleveland drive by committing penalties on two consecutive plays, and free safety Cedric Brown was badly missed.

=== Week 5: at Chicago Bears ===
Week 5: Tampa Bay Buccaneers at Chicago Bears – Game summary

Quarter	1	2	3	4	Total
Buccaneers	0	0	0	0	0
Bears	0	3	10	10	23

at Soldier Field, Chicago, Illinois

- Date: October 6
- Game time: 9:00 p.m. EDT/8:00 p.m. CDT
- Game weather: 49 °F (9 °C)
- Game attendance: 61,350
- TV announcers (ABC): Frank Gifford and Howard Cosell
- Box score

Game information

First quarter

- No scoring plays

Second quarter

- CHI – Bob Thomas 30-yard field goal. Bears 3–0.

Third quarter

- CHI – Mike Phipps 5-yard run (Bob Thomas kick). Bears 10–0.
- CHI – Bob Thomas 44-yard field goal. Bears 13–0.

Fourth quarter

- CHI – Bob Thomas 29-yard field goal. Bears 16–0.
- CHI – Mike Phipps 1-yard run (Bob Thomas kick). Bears 23–0.

Top passers

- TB – Doug Williams – 9/28, 89 yards
- CHI – Mike Phipps – 10/21, 110 yards

Top rushers

- TB – Jerry Eckwood – 10 rushes, 28 yards
- CHI – Walter Payton – 28 rushes, 133 yards

Top receivers

- TB – Gordon Jones – 3 receptions, 62 yards
- CHI – Brian Baschnagel – 1 reception, 37 yards

A second Monday Night Football appearance saw the Buccaneer defense return to form, but the offense failed to generate any points. A chance at an early lead was lost when Doug Williams' touchdown pass to Jimmie Giles was called back due to a holding penalty. Williams was held to 9 completions for 89 yards on 28 pass attempts, and was benched early to protect him from injury from the Bears' pass rush, according to coach McKay. Walter Payton's 133 yards on 28 carries moved him ahead of Gale Sayers as the Bears' all-time offensive leader. Alan Page had a sack, a fumble recovery, an interception, and blocked a field-goal attempt. Of his team's performance, McKay said afterward that "We set Monday Night Football back 2,000 years". Both teams entered the game as playoff teams from the previous season who were in two-game losing streaks and saw winning this game as important for staying in the current season's playoff picture, as the Detroit Lions had already taken a two-game division lead.

=== Week 6: vs Green Bay Packers ===
Week 6: Green Bay Packers at Tampa Bay Buccaneers – Game summary

Quarter	1	2	3	4	OT	Total
Packers	7	7	0	0	0	14
Buccaneers	0	7	0	7	0	14

at Tampa Stadium, Tampa, Florida

- Date: October 12
- Game time: 1:00 p.m. EDT
- Game weather: 73 °F (23 °C)
- Game attendance: 64,854
- Box score

Game information

First quarter

- GB – Terdell Middleton 3-yard run (Tom Birney kick). Packers 7–0.

Second quarter

- TB – Richard Wood 55-yard interception return (Garo Yepremian kick). Tied 7–7.
- GB – Paul Coffman 6-yard pass from Lynn Dickey (Tom Birney kick). Packers 14–7.

Third quarter

- No scoring plays

Fourth quarter

- TB – Doug Williams 5-yard run (Garo Yepremian kick). Tied 14–14.

Overtime

- No scoring plays

Top passers

- GB – Lynn Dickey – 35/51, 418 yards, TD, 2 INT
- TB – Doug Williams – 6/24, 103 yards

Top rushers

- GB – Eddie Lee Ivery – 18 rushes, 74 yards
- TB – Ricky Bell – 21 rushes, 85 yards

Top receivers

- GB – Paul Coffman – 9 receptions, 109 yards, TD
- TB – Jimmie Giles – 2 receptions, 65 yards

Lynn Dickey passed for 418 yards, which set records for the most in Packers history and the most by a Buccaneer opponent. McKay said that none of his linebackers played well, even though Richard Wood returned a fumble 55 yards for a touchdown. McKay also complained that the team gained only 180 yards rushing, despite the line opening "holes so big I couldn't believe it....(we) should have gained 400 yards". He later admitted that the holes were closing quickly and that the linemen were not finishing off their blocks. The offense was marked by indisciplined play, with receivers running wrong routes and fullbacks blocking the wrong opponent. The linebackers had been considered the strength of the team, but played poor pass defense, and lost two more starters (David Lewis and Cecil Johnson) with injuries. Bill Kollar missed the game with a broken hand, and Mike Washington played despite injury. McKay said after the game that the team was coasting on the previous year's performance, and that they would be ready to forget about the current season and pay attention to the following year if there was no improvement.

=== Week 7: at Houston Oilers ===
Week 7: Tampa Bay Buccaneers at Houston Oilers – Game summary

Quarter	1	2	3	4	Total
Buccanners	0	7	0	7	14
Oilers	3	10	7	0	20

at Houston Astrodome, Houston, Texas

- Date: October 19
- Game time: 4:00 p.m. EDT/3:00 p.m. CDT
- Game weather: None (played indoors)
- Game attendance: 48,167
- Box score

Game information

First quarter

- HOU – Toni Fritsch 21-yard field goal. Oilers 3–0.

Second quarter

- HOU – Toni Fritsch 33-yard field goal. Oilers 6–0.
- HOU – Mike Barber 17-yard pass from Ken Stabler (Toni Fritsch kick). Oilers 13–0.
- TB – Gordon Jones 17-yard pass from Doug Williams (Garo Yepremian kick). Oilers 13–7.

Third quarter

- HOU – Rob Carpenter 10-yard run (Toni Fritsch kick). Oilers 20–7.

Fourth quarter

- TB – Cedric Brown 80-yard fumble return (Garo Yepremian kick). Oilers 20–14.

Top passers

- TB – Doug Williams – 16/28, 142 yards, TD, 2 INT
- HOU – Ken Stabler – 19/26, 242 yards, TD, INT

Top rushers

- TB – Johnny Davis – 6 rushes, 23 yards
- HOU – Earl Campbell – 33 rushes, 203 yards

Top receivers

- TB – Gordon Jones – 4 receptions, 58 yards, TD
- HOU – Mike Renfro – 3 receptions, 75 yards

Lee Roy Selmon was held ineffective by Oilers tackle Leon Gray. Behind the blocking of Gray and tight end Dave Casper, Earl Campbell rushed for 203 yards. Coach McKay singled out rookie linebacker Scot Brantley for praise, but for the most part the Buccaneers' play was marked by missed tackles and mental errors. The receiving corps was especially prone to errors, with receivers frequently running wrong routes or being penalized for illegal formation or pass interference. The poor play of the receivers contributed to the coaching staff's decision to sign a receiver. Their first choice was Gerald Carter, who had been one of the last training camp cuts, but Carter had to clear recall waivers and was claimed by the New York Jets. San Francisco 49ers and ex-FSU receiver Mike Shumann was signed instead. The Buccaneers had to play many inexperienced players, with rookie Andy Hawkins taking Dave Lewis' place, all of the regular interior offensive linemen injured, and guard Ray Snell too ill to start. Two starters on the line, center Jim Leonard and left guard George Yarno, had a combined 1 year of NFL experience between them. Right guard Greg Roberts' place was taken by former Jets starter Darrell Austin, who had caused Roberts' knee injury by falling on him. Austin had no starting experience with the Buccaneers.

=== Week 8: at San Francisco 49ers ===
Week 8: Tampa Bay Buccaneers at San Francisco 49ers – Game summary

Quarter	1	2	3	4	Total
Buccaneers	7	0	14	3	24
49ers	7	6	7	3	23

at Candlestick Park, San Francisco, California

- Date: October 26
- Game time: 4:00 p.m. EST/1:00 p.m. PST
- Game weather: 56 °F (13 °C)
- Game attendance: 51,925
- Box score

Game information

First quarter

- SF – Freddie Solomon 53-yard punt return (Ray Wersching kick). 49ers 7–0.
- TB – Jerry Eckwood 2-yard run (Garo Yepremian kick). Tied 7–7.

Second quarter

- SF – Ray Wersching 38-yard field goal. 49ers 10–7.
- SF – Ray Wersching 40-yard field goal. 49ers 13–7.

Third quarter

- TB – Jerry Eckwood 35-yard run (Garo Yepremian kick). Buccaneers 14–13.
- SF – Lenvil Elliott 45-yard pass from Joe Montana (Ray Wersching kick). 49ers 20–14.
- TB – Doug Williams 2-yard run (Garo Yepremian kick). Buccaneer 21–20.

Fourth quarter

- SF – Ray Wersching 18-yard field goal. 49ers 23–21.
- TB – Garo Yepremian 30-yard field goal. Buccaneers 24–23.

Top passers

- TB – Doug Williams – 10/18, 89 yards, INT
- SF – Joe Montana – 24/31, 200 yards, TD, INT

Top rushers

- TB – Jerry Eckwood – 14 rushes, 79 yards, 2 TD
- SF – Earl Cooper – 13 rushes, 50 yards

Top receivers

- TB – Ricky Bell – 5 receptions, 49 yards
- SF – Lenvil Elliott – 5 receptions, 74 yards, TD

Mike Washington's 14-yard interception of a Joe Montana pass set up a 2-yard Doug Williams touchdown run to give the Buccaneers a third-quarter lead. The 49ers took the lead back on a Ray Wersching field goal, but Garo Yepremian added a field goal with 47 seconds left to provide the winning points. The kick left Yepremian just two shy of becoming the ninth player to kick 200 career field goals.

=== Week 9: vs New York Giants ===
Week 9: New York Giants at Tampa Bay Buccaneers – Game summary

Quarter	1	2	3	4	Total
Giants	0	0	6	7	13
Buccaneers	7	16	0	7	30

at Tampa Stadium, Tampa, Florida

- Date: November 2
- Game time: 1:00 p.m. EST
- Game weather: 67 °F (19 °C)
- Game attendance: 68,256
- Box score

Game information

First quarter

- TB – Ricky Bell 21-yard run (Garo Yepremian kick). Buccaneers 7–0.

Second quarter

- TB – Garo Yepremian 22-yard field goal. Buccaneers 10–0.
- TB – Garo Yepremian 37-yard field goal. Buccaneers 13–0.
- TB – Mike Shumann 25-yard pass from Doug Williams (Garo Yepremian kick). Buccaneers 20–0.
- TB – Garo Yepremian 35-yard field goal. Buccaneers 23–0.

Third quarter

- NYG – Gary Shirk 8-yard pass from Phil Simms (kick failed). Buccaneers 23–6.

Fourth quarter

- TB – Ricky Bell 1-yard run (Garo Yepremian kick). Buccaneers 30–6.
- NYG – Larry Heater 1-yard run (Joe Danelo kick). Buccaneers 30–13.

Top passers

- NYG – Phil Simms – 22/34, 155 yards, TD, 2 INT
- TB – Doug Williams – 13/25, 163 yards, TD

Top rushers

- NYG – Billy Taylor – 14 rushes, 56 yards
- TB – Ricky Bell – 26 rushes, 130 yards, 2 TD

Top receivers

- NYG – Billy Taylor – 11 receptions, 67 yards
- TB – Mike Shumann – 2 receptions, 47 yards, TD

The Buccaneers regained their form of the previous season to take a 23–0 halftime lead, as they faced a New York Giants team with even worse injury problems than their own. With seven starters lost with injuries, the Giants started six rookies on defense. The Buccaneers attempted to alleviate their own injury problems by activating linebacker Rik Bonness from injured reserve, but this required that he clear waivers, and he was claimed by the Giants only to be released two days later and return to Tampa Bay. Ricky Bell gained 130 yards on 25 carries, and scored two touchdowns. In the minute before halftime, Tampa Bay turned a 10–0 lead into a 23–0 lead, scoring two field goals and a touchdown with the aid of two Giants fumbles. Bill Kollar caused a Phil Simms fumble that Lee Roy Selmon recovered, setting up Doug Williams' 25-yard touchdown pass to Mike Shumann. On the next play from scrimmage, Selmon delivered a hard hit on Billy Taylor that caused a fumble which Kollar recovered, setting up a field goal. The Giants were held to 2 first downs, 2 yards passing, and 17 offensive plays in the first half. Garo Yepremian's parents were in attendance to see him kick his 200th career field goal and set a Buccaneer record of 18 consecutive successful extra-point attempts. The game continued a trend of last-minute rallies. In three of their four victories, 37 of their 57 points were scored during the last two minutes before the end of a half, and three times the winning points were scored after the two-minute warning.

=== Week 10: vs Pittsburgh Steelers ===
Week 10: Pittsburgh Steelers at Tampa Bay Buccaneers – Game summary

Quarter	1	2	3	4	Total
Steelers	10	14	0	0	24
Buccaneers	7	7	7	0	21

at Tampa Stadium, Tampa, Florida

- Date: November 9
- Game time: 1:00 p.m. EST
- Game weather: 74 °F (23 °C)
- Game attendance: 71,636
- Referee: Fred Wyant
- TV announcers (NBC): Dick Enberg and Merlin Olsen
- Box score

Game information

First quarter

- PIT – Matt Bahr 48-yard field goal. Steelers 3–0.
- PIT – Dirt Winston 0-yard fumble return (Matt Bahr kick). Steelers 10–0.
- TB – Kevin House 26-yard pass from Doug Williams (Garo Yepremian kick). Steelers 10–7.

Second quarter

- PIT – Sidney Thornton 1-yard run (Matt Bahr kick). Steelers 17–7.
- TB – Jimmie Giles 12-yard pass from Doug Williams (Garo Yepremian kick). Steelers 17–14.
- PIT – Lynn Swann 20-yard pass from Terry Bradshaw (Matt Bahr kick). Steelers 24–14.

Third quarter

- TB – Ricky Bell 8-yard pass from Doug Williams (Garo Yepremian kick). Steelers 24–21.

Fourth quarter

- No scoring plays

Top passers

- PIT – Terry Bradshaw – 11/26, 100 yards, TD, INT
- TB – Doug Williams – 21/45, 302 yards, 3 TD, INT

Top rushers

- PIT – Rocky Bleier – 17 rushes, 78 yards
- TB – Ricky Bell – 22 rushes, 68 yards

Top receivers

- PIT – John Stallworth – 2 receptions, 34 yards
- TB – Jimmie Giles – 6 receptions, 128 yards, TD

Late-game confusion left the Buccaneers one play away from defeating the defending Super Bowl champion Pittsburgh Steelers, as quarterback Doug Williams spiked the ball to stop the game clock on fourth down. Late in the second quarter, Scot Brantley had a clear shot at intercepting a Terry Bradshaw pass, but Richard Wood stepped in front and tipped it into Lynn Swann's hands. It became the game-winning touchdown. The game ended with a Buccaneer rally that died with 23 seconds left. Believing that Tampa Bay had gotten a first down on the previous play, Doug Williams spiked the ball to stop the game clock on fourth down, giving the ball back to the Steelers. The Buccaneers did have one remaining time out, but had been reserving it for a field goal attempt. Certainty that the officials had indicated first down kept team captain Dave Reavis from calling for a measurement, which also would have stopped the game clock. All Buccaneers and several Steelers believed that an official had said that it was first down, while the stadium scoreboard still read third down and 10. Some Steelers thought that Jimmie Giles had misinterpreted an official's sarcastic response to Giles' question of whether it was first down, while Pittsburgh assistant coach George Perles insisted that Williams never spiked the ball at all, but simply underthrew Isaac Hagins. It was largely believed that the Buccaneers had outplayed the Steelers, despite the loss. Aside from the touchdown to Swann, the Pittsburgh offense was ineffective. Bradshaw completed just 11 passes for 100 yards and was replaced by Cliff Stoudt in the fourth quarter. The other seventeen of the Steelers' points were the result of special teams breakdowns. The feared Pittsburgh defense was held to a single sack and only one interception. On one play, all eleven Steeler defenders blitzed Williams, leaving Giles open for a 12-yard touchdown reception. Williams had one of his best performances to date, passing for 302 yards and rushing for 67 more. Williams also threw touchdown passes to Ricky Bell and Kevin House. Steelers receiver John Stallworth fractured his left foot during the game.

=== Week 11: at Minnesota Vikings ===
Week 11: Tampa Bay Buccaneers at Minnesota Vikings – Game summary

Quarter	1	2	3	4	Total
Buccaneers	6	7	10	7	30
Vikings	14	10	7	7	38

at Metropolitan Stadium, Bloomington, Minnesota

- Date: November 16
- Game time: 2:00 p.m. EST/1:00 p.m. CST
- Game attendance: 46,032

The Buccaneers lost to the Minnesota Vikings in an offensive shootout, in which the Vikings were playing for the first time with a set of fully healthy starters at offensive line and quarterback. Quarterback Tommy Kramer credited the Vikings' success to their strategy of throwing the short passes which the Buccaneer defense allowed, then switching to long passes when the Buccaneers adjusted to the short passes. Improved receiver play helped Doug Williams complete 30 of his 55 passes for 486 yards, then the fourth-highest total in NFL history. This remains (as of 2010) the Buccaneers' single-game record, as does Williams' total of 499 yards rushing and passing. The game marked the emergence of rookie Kevin House, who beat Nate Wright for two touchdowns. Issac Hagins caught a 48-yard touchdown, while Gordon Jones caught 7 passes for 121 yards. When Ricky Bell suffered a knee bruise, Tony Davis got his first playing time in his two seasons with the team, and scored a touchdown the first time he touched the ball. A second Davis touchdown reception was nullified by an illegal motion penalty, leaving Tampa Bay to settle for a Garo Yepremian field goal. Kramer threw for 324 yards and two touchdowns, and Ted Brown rushed for two touchdowns for the Vikings. For the second week in a row, a Buccaneer game involved a strange officiating incident. Trying to avoid the pass rush, Williams dumped a pass to tackle Charley Hannah, who threw the ball to the ground when he saw an official waving his arms. Vikings end Randy Holloway picked up the ball and ran it into the end zone for an apparent touchdown. The officials needed several minutes to sort out the situation, and eventually penalized Tampa Bay 14 yards for an illegal forward pass.

=== Week 12: vs Detroit Lions ===
Week 12: Detroit Lions at Tampa Bay Buccaneers – Game summary

Quarter	1	2	3	4	Total
Lions	0	14	3	7	24
Buccaneers	3	7	0	0	10

at Tampa Stadium, Tampa, Florida

- Date: November 23
- Game time: 1:00 p.m. EST
- Game attendance: 64,976

The Lions moved into sole possession of first place in the NFC central race, as the Buccaneers collapsed after taking a 10–0 lead. The Buccaneers scored on their opening possession, a 66-yard drive which ended in a Garo Yepremian field goal. Curtis Jordan's recovery of a Billy Sims fumble led to a 12-yard touchdown pass from Doug Williams to Gordon Jones in the second quarter. Detroit answered with an 85-yard drive that ended with the Buccaneer defense overpursuing on a reverse, allowing Ray Williams to run 11 yards untouched for a touchdown. Jerry Eckwood fumbled on the following possession, giving the Lions the ball at the Buccaneer 32-yard line and setting them up for Sims' 24-yard touchdown run. The Lions later scored on a field goal set up by a long punt return by Williams, and a touchdown set up by Norris Thomas' penalty for a late hit on Horace King that gave Detroit the ball back when they had been stopped on third down. Ricky Bell did not play due to a bruised thigh suffered in the previous week's loss to the Vikings. Coach McKay was critical of the fumbling of Eckwood and Danny Reece (who fumbled two punts), stating that both would lose their starting roles.

=== Week 13: at Green Bay Packers ===
Week 13: Tampa Bay Buccaneers at Green Bay Packers – Game summary

Quarter	1	2	3	4	Total
Buccaneers	10	0	3	7	20
Packers	0	3	0	14	17

at Lambeau Field, Green Bay, Wisconsin

- Date: November 30
- Game time: 2:00 p.m. EST/1:00 p.m. CST
- Game attendance: 54,225

The Buccaneers won in come-from-behind fashion against the Packers. The Buccaneers led for most of the game on a 17-yard Doug Williams touchdown pass to Isaac Hagins, and a pair of Garo Yepremian field goals. Green Bay took a fourth-quarter lead after Cedric Brown's pass-interference penalty (called against Mike Washington) gave them the ball at the Buccaneers' 1-yard line. Eddie Lee Ivery ran for a touchdown on the next play, and when the Buccaneers failed to move the ball on the ensuing possession, it took less than a minute for Packers quarterback Lynn Dickey to hit Paul Coffman with a 17-yard touchdown for the lead. Kevin House caught a tipped pass over safety Johnnie Gray at the Packers' 1-yard line with 2:45 remaining to set up Johnny Davis' touchdown run for the winning score, though the Buccaneers still needed to survive a Jan Stenerud field goal attempt with 21 seconds to play. Coach McKay would later joke that the game had been planned all along to end that way, for excitement. Lee Roy Selmon, Bill Kollar, and Ray Snell all left the game with injuries. With Ricky Bell still sidelined with a mild knee injury, Rick Berns made his first career start. Berns had received much press attention during the previous week, due to coach McKay's sarcastic comments that "we might start the fabulous Rick Berns. He doesn't catch the ball in practice, maybe he will in a game". Berns led Tampa Bay rushers with 72 yards on 19 carries, although his fumble on the Packers' 2-yard line ended a scoring opportunity on the opening drive.

=== Week 14: vs Minnesota Vikings ===
Week 14: Minnesota Vikings at Tampa Bay Buccaneers – Game summary

Quarter	1	2	3	4	Total
Vikings	0	0	7	14	21
Buccaneers	3	7	0	0	10

at Tampa Stadium, Tampa, Florida

- Date: December 7
- Game time: 1:00 p.m. EST
- Game attendance: 65,649

The Buccaneers dominated the Vikings through the first half in a game which they needed to win to remain in playoff contention, but in the second half collapsed on both offense and defense. In the first half, Vikings quarterback Tommy Kramer was held to 7 completions for 63 yards, with no catches by the wide receivers and no success in the ground game. In the second half, Kramer went 15-of-19 for 201 yards. His 17-yard touchdown pass to Sammy White gave the Vikings the lead for good early in the fourth quarter. Kramer's scrambling kept the linebackers out of coverage, and opened up passing routes such as Bob Tucker's 25-yard reception that set up the first Viking touchdown. The Buccaneers were still in position to win until Fred McNeill recovered Rick Berns' fumble at the Viking 12-yard line with five minutes to play. Much-criticized for his handling of players due to his previous week's postgame comments about Berns, McKay responded to all postgame questions by saying "all of the players played lovely".

=== Week 15: at Detroit Lions ===
Week 15: Tampa Bay Buccaneers at Detroit Lions – Game summary

Quarter	1	2	3	4	Total
Buccaneers	7	0	0	7	14
Lions	7	7	3	10	27

at Pontiac Silverdome, Pontiac, Michigan

- Date: December 14
- Game time: 4:00 p.m. EST
- Game attendance: 77,098

Despite the Lions having received news of their elimination from contention for the division title only minutes into the game, they were noticeably more motivated to win than the Buccaneers were. Tampa Bay took an early lead on Dave Logan's 60-yard fumble recovery touchdown, but the Lions answered the score on their next possession. The Buccaneers struggled to move the ball all day, gaining only 40 yards on the ground. The Buccaneers were also able to stop Billy Sims and the Lions' running game, but Gary Danielson had much success passing. Doug Williams completed only 13 of 37 passes, with two interceptions. Lions receiver Ray Williams caught a 22-yard touchdown pass from Danielson, while Sims contributed a 1-yard touchdown run and Eddie Murray kicked two field goals. The Buccaneers still had a shot at victory after Williams hit Kevin House for a 32-yard fourth-quarter touchdown, but Ray Williams returned the ensuing kickoff for a touchdown.

=== Week 16: vs Chicago Bears ===
Week 16: Chicago Bears at Tampa Bay Buccaneers – Game summary

Quarter	1	2	3	4	Total
Bears	0	7	7	0	14
Buccaneers	10	0	3	0	13

at Tampa Stadium, Tampa, Florida

- Date: December 20
- Game time: 4:00 p.m. EST
- Game attendance: 55,298

The Bears took the lead for good after Jerry Eckwood's fumble on the Buccaneer two-yard line set up a Vince Evans touchdown. The fumble was one of three committed by Eckwood, although one was called back and the other was recovered by Doug Williams. Eckwood was taken out of the game after the third fumble, which occurred while Eckwood was playing with a separated shoulder. Eckwood was not alone in fumbling, as Kevin House and Jimmie Giles were both stripped of the ball near the goal line, ending two potential game-winning fourth-quarter drives. The Buccaneers still had one last opportunity to win the game, but Al Harris blocked Garo Yepremian's field goal attempt with 40 seconds left. Ricky Bell reinjured his knee and sat out the second half, while Ray Snell suffered a knee injury. $6,000 worth of equipment and uniforms were stolen from the Bears' locker room before the game, but play was not affected, as the Bears had two sets of gear.

== Awards and honors ==
- Lee Roy Selmon, All-Pro selection
- Lee Roy Selmon, Pro Bowl selection
- Jimmie Giles, Pro Bowl selection
- Dave Lewis, Pro Bowl Selection
- Ray Snell, All-Rookie
