= 1979 Tampa Bay Buccaneers season =

1979 4th season in the National Football League

- Owner: Hugh Culverhouse
- Head coach: John McKay
- Home stadium: Tampa Stadium

Results
- Record: 10–6
- Division place: 1st NFC Central
- Playoffs: Won Divisional Playoffs (vs. Eagles) 24–17; Lost NFC Championship (vs. Rams) 0–9
- All-Pros: LB Dewey Selmon (second-team)
- Pro Bowlers: DE Lee Roy Selmon
- Team MVP: HB Ricky Bell

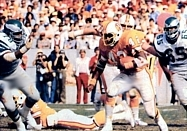
Buccaneers' running back Ricky Bell rushing the ball during 1979 NFC Divisional Playoff Game.

The 1979 Tampa Bay Buccaneers season was the franchise's 4th season in the National Football League. All home games were played at Tampa Stadium. After having won just seven games in the previous three seasons combined, the 1979 Buccaneers won ten games for their first winning season. They finished as NFC Central division champions and won the first playoff game in franchise history.

The Buccaneers added offensive threats to complement their solid defense; a healthy Doug Williams played his first full season and Ricky Bell became the team's first 1,000-yard back, rushing for a career-high 1,263 yards.

Tampa Bay also had the number one defense in football allowing only 237 points all season, while their opponents scored only 14.8 points per game.

The 1979 team not only posted their first winning record but earned a playoff spot by winning the NFC Central division title. The playoff spot was secured in the final week in a rain-sodden game against the Kansas City Chiefs, with the only score being a 19-yard field goal by Neil O'Donoghue. The Bucs recorded their first-ever playoff win by defeating the Philadelphia Eagles 24–17, behind Bell's 142 yards rushing. Tampa Bay hosted the 1979 NFC Championship Game the following week but lost 9–0 to the Los Angeles Rams.

== Offseason ==
=== NFL draft ===
1979 Tampa Bay Buccaneers draft
| Round | Pick | Player | Position | College | Notes |
| 2 | 33 | Greg Roberts | G | Oklahoma | from Oakland |
| 2 | 34 | Gordon Jones | WR | Pittsburgh | |
| 3 | 60 | Jerry Eckwood | RB | Arkansas | from Baltimore |
| 3 | 68 | Reggie Lewis | DE | North Texas | from Houston |
| 3 | 80 | Rick Berns | RB | Nebraska | from Oakland |
| 5 | 133 | Chuck Fusina | QB | Penn State | from Houston |
| 8 | 217 | Gene Sanders | DT | Texas A&M | from Miami |
| 9 | 225 | Henry Vereen | WR | UNLV | |
| 11 | 281 | Bob Rippentrop | TE | Fresno State | |
| 12 | 307 | Dave Logan * | DT | Pittsburgh | |
Made roster * Made at least one Pro Bowl during career

==== Draft trades ====
The Buccaneers had no selection in the first round, that pick having been traded to the Chicago Bears for defensive end Wally Chambers. (Note: The Bears used this pick to select Dan Hampton) The Buccaneers had extra picks in the second and third rounds in return for trading nose tackle Dave Pear to the Oakland Raiders. They also had extra third and fifth round picks from the Houston Oilers, as part of the 1978 trade for the Buccaneers' first overall pick. They received a third-round pick from the Baltimore Colts in return for running back Dan Hardeman. The Buccaneers' own third-round pick went to the Miami Dolphins as NFL-ordered compensation for signing Randy Crowder. Defensive end Council Rudolph was traded to the Dolphins in return for an eighth-round pick. Other picks were traded as follows: round 4 to the Detroit Lions for Rockne Freitas, round 5 to the Seattle Seahawks, round six to Oakland for Rik Bonness, round seven to the Washington Redskins for Frank Grant, round eight to the New York Jets for Darrell Austin, and round ten to the San Francisco 49ers for Jim Obradovich.

==== Draft selections ====
The Buccaneers doubled the size of their scouting staff from two to four, hoping to get more mileage out of the later rounds of the draft. Greg Roberts was the 1978 Outland Trophy winner, and blocked for 1978 Heisman Trophy winner Billy Sims. The Buccaneers had him rated as the best lineman in the draft, and expected him to have been selected long before the second round, where the Buccaneers had their highest selection. He is believed to have fallen to the second round due to an inability to pass-block, having played at the run-heavy University of Oklahoma. This resulted in a poor performance at the Senior Bowl. Gordon Jones, with a 4.59 time in the 40-yard dash, drew pre-draft comparisons to Lynn Swann, but dropped to the second round due to concerns over his speed. He was the third receiver selected overall. Roberts and Jones both left the Buccaneers after four seasons. Jerry Eckwood and Rick Berns were selected to address injury problems at running back. Eckwood had been second in the nation in rushing (behind Ricky Bell) before being injured in 1975. Berns was at the time the leading rusher in Nebraska history. Eckwood and Berns impressed McKay enough in mini-camp that he traded Louis Carter away. Gene Sanders played for several seasons, after successfully converting to offensive tackle. Twelfth-round selection Dave Logan, the lowest-round draft selection to stick with the team, went on to become one of the Buccaneers' best and most popular players.

=== Preseason ===
==== Offseason personnel changes ====
Dave Pear, the Buccaneers' first Pro Bowl selection and most popular player, was traded to the Oakland Raiders for two draft picks. This was partly to get extra help in what was expected to be a strong offensive draft, but also because Pear had requested that he be traded if his contract could not be renegotiated. Dave Green, the punter and kicker through the first three seasons, had to be replaced when he tore his Achilles tendon stepping over a tackling dummy in training camp.

==== Cancellation of Dolphins scrimmage ====
Miami Dolphins owner Joe Robbie canceled the yearly preseason matchup in Tampa, claiming that the Buccaneers approached the matchup with excessive intensity, resulting in Dolphin injuries. A dispute with Buccaneers owner Hugh Culverhouse was also a factor, as Culverhouse was promoting a proposed rule to ban NFL owners and their families from holding controlling interest in other sports teams. Robbie's wife Elizabeth was the owner of the NASL Ft. Lauderdale Strikers.

== 1979 roster ==
Tampa Bay Buccaneers 1979 roster
| Quarterbacks: 14 Chuck Fusina; 15 Mike Rae; 12 Doug Williams; Running backs: 42 Ricky Bell; 36 Rick Berns; 38 Johnny Davis; 43 Jerry Eckwood; 27 Tony Davis; 23 George Ragsdale; Wide receivers: 81 Isaac Hagins; 87 Larry Mucker; 84 Gordon Jones; 85 Morris Owens; Tight ends: 88 Jimmie Giles; 86 Jim Obradovich | Offensive linemen: 69 Darrell Austin C/G/T; 70 Darryl Carlton T; 64 Greg Horton G; 75 Dave Reavis T; 61 Greg Roberts G; 50 Steve Wilson C; 68 George Yarno G/C; Defensive linemen: 60 Wally Chambers DE; 71 Randy Crowder NT; 77 Bill Kollar NT; 79 Reggie Lewis DE; 76 David Logan NT; 74 Gene Sanders DE; 63 Lee Roy Selmon DE | Linebackers: 53 Rik Bonness OLB; 55 Aaron Brown ILB; 56 Cecil Johnson OLB; 57 David Lewis OLB; 51 Dana Nafziger OLB; 54 Richard Wood ILB; 58 Dewey Selmon ILB; Defensive backs: 34 Cedric Brown FS; 44 Billy Cesare CB/S; 33 Mark Cotney SS; 25 Curtis Jordan SS/FS; 46 Danny Reece CB; 40 Mike Washington CB; 45 Jeris White CB; Special teams: 16 Tom Blanchard P; 6 Neil O'Donoghue K | Reserve lists: 31 Jerry Anderson S (IR); 35 Jimmy DuBose RB (IR); 4 Dave Green P (IR); 73 Charley Hannah T (IR); 65 Randy Johnson C/G (IR); 89 J. K. McKay WR (IR); 78 Kurt Schumacher G (IR); rookies in italics |

== Coaching staff ==
Tampa Bay Buccaneers 1979 coaching staff
| Front office: Owner – Hugh Culverhouse; Head coaches: Head coach – John McKay; Offensive coaches: Quarterbacks & Receivers – Bill Nelsen; Running backs – George Chaump; Offensive line – Bill Johnson | Defensive coaches: Defensive coordinator/linebackers – Tom Bass; Defensive line/chief assistant – Abe Gibron; Secondary – Wayne Fontes; Special teams coaches: Special teams coordinator – Phil Krueger |

== Regular season ==
As in 1978, McKay thought that a 9–7 record was a reasonable goal for the season. The Buccaneers surprised the NFL by winning the team's first five games, becoming the season's last undefeated team and appearing on the cover of Sports Illustrated. It also put them in first place for good in the NFC Central. The team's youth became an issue, as the Buccaneers went into a late-season losing streak on the verge of earning the team's first playoff spot. It was felt that more veteran leadership would have helped the team during the stretch run. Linebacker Dave Lewis publicly stated that the team was "choking", while Selmon—who had played on the expansion team when it began 0–26—compared the difficulty of getting the playoff-clinching win to the difficulty of getting the team's first win. After dropping three games in a row, of which winning any of the three would have clinched the division, McKay launched into an obscenity-laced tirade against reporters who called the team a "laughingstock" and "Chokeneers".

Even against a schedule (Note: Pro Football Reference says that the only teams since to gain an easier schedule than the 1979 Buccaneers were the 1991 Buffalo Bills with five games against teams 4–12 or worse and the 1999 St. Louis Rams with only one game against a team with a winning record (ironically against the Titans, whom they would defeat in the Super Bowl).) that featured only two opponents with winning records (Note: These were division rivals the Chicago Bears and the 9–7 Los Angeles Rams.) it took until the final game of the season for the Buccaneers to win their tenth game. A better division record gave the Buccaneers the division win over the also-10–6 Chicago Bears. Despite being listed by Pro Football Reference as the second-worst team to win 10 games ahead only of the 2012 Colts, the Buccaneers became only the second non-Viking team to win the NFC Central since 1970, (Note: The other non-Viking team to win the NFC Central during the 1970s was the 1972 Green Bay Packers, who finished 10–4 to the Lions 8–5–1 and the Vikings’ 7–7.) and the only one to advance in the playoffs. The Buccaneers were considered by many to be an unworthy division champion, even called “cheesecake champions” by opponents, but advanced to the NFC Championship with a 24–17 victory over the Philadelphia Eagles. There, with several key players injured, they held the Los Angeles Rams to nine points, but were held scoreless on offense to end their season one game short of the Super Bowl.

=== Schedule ===
| Week | Date | Opponent | Result | Record | Venue | Attendance |
|---|---|---|---|---|---|---|
| 1 | September 1 | **Detroit Lions** | **W** 31–16 | 1–0 | Tampa Stadium | 68,225 |
| 2 | September 9 | at Baltimore Colts | **W** 29–26 (OT) | 2–0 | Memorial Stadium | 36,374 |
| 3 | September 16 | at **Green Bay Packers** | **W** 21–10 | 3–0 | Lambeau Field | 55,498 |
| 4 | September 23 | Los Angeles Rams | **W** 21–6 | 4–0 | Tampa Stadium | 69,497 |
| 5 | September 30 | at **Chicago Bears** | **W** 17–13 | 5–0 | Soldier Field | 55,258 |
| 6 | October 7 | at New York Giants | **L** 14–17 | 5–1 | Giants Stadium | 72,841 |
| 7 | October 14 | New Orleans Saints | **L** 14–42 | 5–2 | Tampa Stadium | 67,640 |
| 8 | October 21 | **Green Bay Packers** | **W** 21–3 | 6–2 | Tampa Stadium | 67,186 |
| 9 | October 28 | at **Minnesota Vikings** | **W** 12–10 | 7–2 | Metropolitan Stadium | 46,906 |
| 10 | November 4 | at Atlanta Falcons | **L** 14–17 | 7–3 | Atlanta–Fulton County Stadium | 55,150 |
| 11 | November 11 | at **Detroit Lions** | **W** 16–14 | 8–3 | Pontiac Silverdome | 70,461 |
| 12 | November 18 | New York Giants | **W** 31–3 | 9–3 | Tampa Stadium | 70,261 |
| 13 | November 25 | **Minnesota Vikings** | **L** 22–23 | 9–4 | Tampa Stadium | 70,039 |
| 14 | December 2 | **Chicago Bears** | **L** 0–14 | 9–5 | Tampa Stadium | 69,508 |
| 15 | December 9 | at San Francisco 49ers | **L** 7–23 | 9–6 | Candlestick Park | 44,506 |
| 16 | December 16 | Kansas City Chiefs | **W** 3–0 | 10–6 | Tampa Stadium | 63,624 |
Note: Intra-division opponents are in **bold** text.

==== Week 1: vs. Detroit Lions ====
Week One: Detroit Lions at Tampa Bay Buccaneers – Game summary

| Quarter | 1 | 2 | 3 | 4 | Total |
|---|---|---|---|---|---|
| Lions | 0 | 7 | 0 | 9 | **16** |
| **Buccaneers** | 10 | 14 | 0 | 7 | **31** |

at Tampa Stadium, Tampa, Florida

- Date: September 1
- Game time: 8:00 p.m. EDT
- Game weather: 79 °F (26 °C)
- Game attendance: 68,225
- Referee: Chuck Heberling
- TV: CBS
- Box score

Game information

**First quarter**

- TB – Neil O'Donoghue 31-yard field goal. Buccaneers 3–0.
- TB – Lee Roy Selmon 29-yard fumble return (Neil O'Donoghue kick). Buccaneers 10–0.

**Second quarter**

- DET – David Hill 11-yard pass from Joe Reed (Benny Ricardo kick). Buccaneers 10–7.
- TB – Ricky Bell 7-yard run (Neil O'Donoghue kick). Buccaneers 17–7.
- TB – Jimmie Giles 66-yard pass from Doug Williams (Neil O'Donoghue kick). Buccaneers 24–7.

**Third quarter**

- No scoring plays

**Fourth quarter**

- TB – Jim Obradovich 2-yard pass from Doug Williams (Neil O'Donoghue kick). Buccaneers 31–7.
- DET – Rick Kane 3-yard run (Benny Ricardo kick). Buccaneers 31–14.
- DET – Mike Rae tackled in end zone. Buccaneers 31–16.

**Top passers**

- DET – Joe Reed – 8/15, 61 yards, TD
- TB – Doug Williams – 4/16, 99 yards, 2 TD

**Top rushers**

- DET – Horace King – 10 rushes, 53 yards
- TB – Jerry Eckwood – 20 rushes, 121 yards

**Top receivers**

- DET – David Hill – 5 receptions, 48 yards, TD
- TB – Jimmie Giles – 3 receptions, 97 yards, TD

Rookie running back Jerry Eckwood rushed for a team record 121 yards, and the overall total of 229 yards rushing also set a team record. Lions quarterback Joe Reed was knocked out of the game in the third quarter with a groin injury. When Wally Chambers forced the Lions' Horace King to fumble in the first quarter, Lee Roy Selmon returned the ball 29 yards for a touchdown. A 62-yard drive led to a touchdown by Ricky Bell, followed by a 66-yard touchdown pass from Doug Williams to Jimmie Giles. The Buccaneers then ate up 8½ minutes of the third quarter, finishing off with a touchdown pass to Jim Obradovich.

==== Week 2: at Baltimore Colts ====
Week Two: Tampa Bay Buccaneers at Baltimore Colts – Game summary

| Quarter | 1 | 2 | 3 | 4 | OT | Total |
|---|---|---|---|---|---|---|
| **Buccaneers** | 0 | 13 | 0 | 13 | 3 | **29** |
| Colts | 17 | 0 | 0 | 9 | 0 | **26** |

at Memorial Stadium, Baltimore, Maryland

- Date: September 9
- Game time: 2:00 p.m. EDT
- Game weather: 64 °F (18 °C)
- Game attendance: 36,374
- Referee: Cal Lepore
- TV announcers (CBS): Lindsey Nelson and Paul Hornung
- Box score

Game information

**First quarter**

- BAL – Don Hardeman 4-yard pass from Greg Landry (Toni Linhart kick). Colts 7–0.
- BAL – Toni Linhart 24-yard field goal. Colts 10–0.
- BAL – Don Hardeman 1-yard run (Toni Linhart kick). Colts 17–0.

**Second quarter**

- TB – Ricky Bell 1-yard run (kick failed). Colts 17–6.
- TB – Isaac Hagins 9-yard pass from Doug Williams (Neil O'Donoghue kick). Colts 17–13.

**Third quarter**

- No scoring plays

**Fourth quarter**

- TB – Mike Washington 49-yard interception return (Neil O'Donoghue kick). Buccaneers 20–17.
- TB – Gordon Jones 36-yard pass from Doug Williams (kick failed). Buccaneers 26–17.
- BAL – Brian DeRoo 67-yard pass from Greg Landry (kick failed). Buccaneers 26–23.
- BAL – Toni Linhart 38-yard field goal. Tied 26–26.

**Overtime**

- TB – Neil O'Donoghue 31-yard field goal. Buccaneers 29–26.

**Top passers**

- TB – Doug Williams – 10/29, 196 yards, 2 TD, 2 INT
- BAL – Greg Landry – 22/37, 183 yards, 2 TD, 2 INT

**Top rushers**

- TB – Jerry Eckwood – 19 rushes, 53 yards
- BAL – Don Hardeman – 18 rushes, 58 yards, TD

**Top receivers**

- TB – Ricky Bell – 3 receptions, 56 yards
- BAL – Brian DeRoo – 3 receptions, 81 yards, TD

The Buccaneers overcame a shaky start in which they were penalized for 80 yards (including a pass interference penalty on Cedric Brown that was followed by guard Greg Horton being ejected for unsportsmanlike conduct during the 1st quarter) and gave up 17 points in what the St. Petersburg Times called "one of the worst and most frustrating first quarters" in team history. Then, later, they had to overcome a fourth-quarter collapse in which they allowed the Colts to score 9 points that sent the Buccaneers into their first overtime game. Doug Williams’ first pass of the day was intercepted by Norman Thompson, but it took the Colts, hampered by the loss of quarterback Bert Jones and running back Joe Washington, 9 plays to get to the end zone from the Buccaneers' 23-yard line. Lee Roy Selmon blocked an extra-point attempt in the fourth quarter that preserved the tie and led to the overtime period. The Buccaneers' ten sacks of Colts quarterback Greg Landry set a new team record. After Randy Crowder stripped the ball from Landry 1:31 into the overtime period, Neil O'Donoghue was immediately sent in to kick the game-winning 31-yard field goal. McKay pointed to the now-stable lineup as a factor in the improvement, saying that previously, the team couldn't call an audible because "one of the guys just got here Tuesday". A Times headline called the team's 2–0 record "amazing".

==== Week 3: at Green Bay Packers ====
Week Three: Tampa Bay Buccaneers at Green Bay Packers – Game summary

| Quarter | 1 | 2 | 3 | 4 | Total |
|---|---|---|---|---|---|
| **Buccaneers** | 0 | 7 | 14 | 0 | **21** |
| Packers | 3 | 0 | 0 | 7 | **10** |

at Lambeau Field, Green Bay, Wisconsin

- Date: September 16
- Game time: 2:00 p.m. EDT/1:00 p.m. CDT
- Game weather: 60 °F (16 °C)
- Game attendance: 55,498
- Referee: Dick Jorgensen
- Box score

Game information

**First quarter**

- GB – Chester Marcol 38-yard field goal. Packers 3–0.

**Second quarter**

- TB – Jerry Eckwood 40-yard run (Neil O'Donoghue kick). Buccaneers 7–3.

**Third quarter**

- TB – Ricky Bell 11-yard pass from Doug Williams (Neil O'Donoghue kick). Buccaneers 14–3.
- TB – Ricky Bell 19-yard run (Neil O'Donoghue kick). Buccaneers 21–3.

**Fourth quarter**

- GB – James Lofton 12-yard pass from David Whitehurst (Chester Marcol kick). Buccaneers 21–10.

**Top passers**

- TB – Doug Williams – 12/24, 132 yards, TD, INT
- GB – David Whitehurst – 24/34, 214 yards, TD

**Top rushers**

- TB – Jerry Eckwood – 23 rushes, 99 yards, TD
- GB – Barty Smith – 10 rushes, 35 yards

**Top receivers**

- TB – Isaac Hagins – 4 receptions, 54 yards
- GB – James Lofton – 7 receptions, 78 yards, TD

After spending the first quarter making futile attempts at running through the middle of the Packer defense, the Buccaneers sent Jerry Eckwood around the left end for a 40-yard touchdown run. Eckwood ran for 99 yards, while Ricky Bell added another 97 on the way to a team-record 235 rushing yards.

==== Week 4: vs. Los Angeles Rams ====
Week Four: Los Angeles Rams at Tampa Bay Buccaneers – Game summary

| Quarter | 1 | 2 | 3 | 4 | Total |
|---|---|---|---|---|---|
| Rams | 6 | 0 | 0 | 0 | **6** |
| **Buccaneers** | 0 | 21 | 0 | 0 | **21** |

at Tampa Stadium, Tampa, Florida

- Date: September 23
- Game time: 4:00 p.m. EDT
- Game weather: 82 °F (28 °C)
- Game attendance: 69,497
- TV announcers (CBS): Vin Scully and George Allen
- Box score

Game information

**First quarter**

- LA – Jim Youngblood 31-yard interception return (kick failed). Rams 6–0.

**Second quarter**

- TB – Larry Mucker 15-yard pass from Doug Williams (Neil O'Donoghue kick). Buccaneers 7–6.
- TB – Ricky Bell 5-yard run (Neil O'Donoghue kick). Buccaneers 14–6.
- TB – Jimmie Giles 29-yard pass from Doug Williams (Neil O'Donoghue kick). Buccaneers 21–6.

**Third quarter**

- No scoring plays

**Fourth quarter**

- No scoring plays

**Top passers**

- LA – Pat Haden – 13/27, 64 yards
- TB – Doug Williams – 5/20, 101 yards, 2 TD, INT

**Top rushers**

- LA – Elvis Peacock – 6 rushes, 47 yards
- TB – Ricky Bell – 18 rushes, 69 yards, TD

**Top receivers**

- LA – Charle Young – 2 receptions, 28 yards
- TB – Jimmie Giles – 1 reception, 29 yards, TD

Jim Youngblood, who had been in on the sack that broke Doug Williams' jaw the previous season, returned an early interception for a touchdown and a 6–0 lead. Shortly thereafter, Bill Kollar recovered a Lawrence McCutcheon fumble at the Rams 27-yard line, leading to a 15-yard touchdown reception by Larry Mucker. Neil O'Donoghue's extra point gave the Buccaneers the lead for good. The Buccaneers further added a 5-yard touchdown run by Ricky Bell and a 29-yard scoring pass to Jimmie Giles, all before the end of the second quarter. The Rams failed to cross midfield at all in the second half, and were held to only 97 yards passing on 35 attempts. McKay, familiar with Rams quarterback Pat Haden from having coached him at USC, tailored the defensive gameplan towards him.

==== Week 5: at Chicago Bears ====
Week Five: Tampa Bay Buccaneers at Chicago Bears – Game summary

| Quarter | 1 | 2 | 3 | 4 | Total |
|---|---|---|---|---|---|
| **Buccaneers** | 0 | 10 | 0 | 7 | **17** |
| Bears | 0 | 3 | 3 | 7 | **13** |

at Soldier Field, Chicago, Illinois

- Date: September 30
- Game time: 2:00 p.m. EDT/1:00 p.m. CDT
- Game attendance: 55,258
- Referee: Gordon McCarter
- TV announcers (CBS): Tim Ryan and Johnny Morris

A 65-yard screen pass from Vince Evans to Walter Payton gave the Bears a 13–10 lead. The Buccaneers answered that with a drive that ended with an eight-yard touchdown reception by Isaac Hagins. This score, with 5:08 left in the game, put the Buccaneers ahead of the Bears and left them as the only remaining undefeated team in the league. It was the third consecutive loss for the Bears. Jerry Eckwood also contributed a 61-yard touchdown run, the longest running play in Buccaneers history to that point. A broken wrist suffered in this game would contribute to Eckwood's diminished performance later in the season.

==== Week 6: at New York Giants ====
Week Six: Tampa Bay Buccaneers at New York Giants – Game summary

| Quarter | 1 | 2 | 3 | 4 | Total |
|---|---|---|---|---|---|
| Buccaneers | 0 | 7 | 0 | 7 | **14** |
| **Giants** | 0 | 14 | 0 | 3 | **17** |

at Giants Stadium, East Rutherford, New Jersey

- Date: October 7
- Game time: 1:00 p.m. EDT
- Game attendance: 72,841
- Referee: Gene Barth
- TV announcers (CBS): Curt Gowdy and Hank Stram

The undefeated Buccaneers lost on the road to the winless New York Giants. Giants quarterback Phil Simms, in his first NFL start, went 6–12 for 37 yards. Billy Taylor, also making his first start, became the first Giant to rush for over 100 yards in a game this season, running for 148 yards and two touchdowns on 33 carries. Doug Williams threw touchdown passes to Larry Mucker and Jimmie Giles, but also threw three interceptions and numerous incompletions.

==== Week 7: vs. New Orleans Saints ====
Week Seven: New Orleans Saints at Tampa Bay Buccaneers – Game summary

| Quarter | 1 | 2 | 3 | 4 | Total |
|---|---|---|---|---|---|
| **Saints** | 0 | 0 | 21 | 21 | **42** |
| Buccaneers | 0 | 0 | 7 | 7 | **14** |

at Tampa Stadium, Tampa, Florida

- Date: October 14
- Game time: 1:00 p.m. EDT
- Game weather: 75 °F (24 °C)
- Game attendance: 67,640
- Referee: Pat Haggerty
- Box score

Game information

**First quarter**

- No scoring plays

**Second quarter**

- No scoring plays

**Third quarter**

- TB – Isaac Hagins 22-yard pass from Doug Williams (Neil O'Donoghue kick). Buccaneers 7–0.
- NO – Archie Manning 2-yard run (Garo Yepremian kick). Tied 7–7.
- NO – Tony Galbreath 6-yard run (Garo Yepremian kick). Saints 14–7.
- NO – Henry Childs 15-yard pass from Archie Manning (Garo Yepremian kick). Saints 21–7.

**Fourth quarter**

- NO – Tony Galbreath 20-yard run (Garo Yepremian kick). Saints 28–7.
- NO – Mike Strachan 1-yard run (Garo Yepremian kick). Saints 35–7.
- NO – Mike Strachan 7-yard run (Garo Yepremian kick). Saints 42–7.
- TB – Jimmie Giles 21-yard pass from Mike Rae (Neil O'Donoghue kick). Saints 42–14.

**Top passers**

- NO – Archie Manning – 11/14, 141 yards, TD
- TB – Doug Williams – 10/28, 142 yards, TD, 2 INT

**Top rushers**

- NO – Tony Galbreath – 21 rushes, 87 yards, 2 TD
- TB – Ricky Bell – 10 rushes, 101 yards

**Top receivers**

- NO – Rich Mauti – 1 reception, 61 yards
- TB – Isaac Hagins – 4 receptions, 71 yards, TD

Archie Manning, who entered the game leading the NFL in passing yardage, went 11 of 14 with a touchdown each rushing and passing. Mike Strachan rushed for two touchdowns.

==== Week 8: vs. Green Bay Packers ====
Week Eight: Green Bay Packers at Tampa Bay Buccaneers – Game summary

| Quarter | 1 | 2 | 3 | 4 | Total |
|---|---|---|---|---|---|
| Packers | 0 | 0 | 3 | 0 | **3** |
| **Buccaneers** | 7 | 7 | 0 | 7 | **21** |

at Tampa Stadium, Tampa, Florida

- Date: October 21
- Game time: 1:00 p.m. EDT
- Game attendance: 67,186
- Referee: Fred Silva
- TV announcers (CBS): Dick Stockton and John Madden

The Buccaneers broke their two-game losing streak as Ricky Bell set a club record with 167 rushing yards, while Doug Williams threw for two touchdowns and rushed for a third. The total of 228 rushing yards was 7 yards shy of the team record set in the previous game against the Packers, and left the Buccaneers as the only team with two rushers on pace to break the 1,000-yard mark. Packers quarterback David Whitehurst threw for a career-best 261 yards, although the Packers never entered the end zone. Jeris White intercepted a potential touchdown pass that slipped out of James Lofton's hands. The win left the Buccaneers at midseason having already achieved their highest win total ever.

==== Week 9: at Minnesota Vikings ====
Week Nine: Tampa Bay Buccaneers at Minnesota Vikings – Game summary

| Quarter | 1 | 2 | 3 | 4 | Total |
|---|---|---|---|---|---|
| **Buccaneers** | 3 | 0 | 3 | 6 | **12** |
| Vikings | 0 | 10 | 0 | 0 | **10** |

at Metropolitan Stadium, Bloomington, Minnesota

- Date: October 28
- Game time: 2:00 p.m. EST/1:00 p.m. CST
- Game attendance: 46,906
- Referee: Jim Tunney
- TV announcers (CBS): Frank Glieber and Roman Gabriel

The Times noted that the Buccaneers, which "would unearth a new way to lose" during the 0-26 losing streak, now "keep discovering different formulas for victory", with a strong game by Doug Williams despite a weak rushing attack. The team survived a last-minute drive by the Vikings in which quarterback Tommy Kramer was penalized for throwing a pass from beyond the line of scrimmage, which helped to keep the Vikings out of field goal range. Curtis Jordan sealed the victory by deflecting Kramer's last-second Hail Mary pass. Kramer later admitted to being aware of having crossed the line of scrimmage, but had hoped that the officials would miss it as they had missed so many other penalties in the game.

The Buccaneers' 7–2 record was equal to that of the Super Bowl XIII teams Pittsburgh Steelers and Dallas Cowboys. Both Buccaneers and Vikings complained about officiating errors and the malfunctioning game clock. The Metropolitan Stadium 30-second clock failed for the second week in a row, as did both regulation clocks.

==== Week 10: at Atlanta Falcons ====
Week Ten: Tampa Bay Buccaneers at Atlanta Falcons – Game summary

| Quarter | 1 | 2 | 3 | 4 | Total |
|---|---|---|---|---|---|
| Buccaneers | 7 | 0 | 0 | 7 | **14** |
| **Falcons** | 0 | 3 | 0 | 14 | **17** |

at Atlanta–Fulton County Stadium, Atlanta, Georgia

- Date: November 4
- Game time: 1:00 p.m. EST
- Game attendance: 55,150
- Referee: Ben Dreith
- TV announcers (CBS): Frank Glieber and Paul Hornung

The Times warned "'Going down!' Buccaneers reverse direction again", as the Falcons controlled the ball for 41 of 60 minutes. An inability to complete long passes, combined with fumbles, prevented the Buccaneers from taking what could have been a large early lead. Isaac Hagins' fumble to Atlanta's Tom Pridemore set up a 31-yard field goal. The Buccaneers maintained a halftime lead, despite having held the ball for only six minutes and 18 seconds in the first half. Falcon blitzing disrupted Doug Williams' passing, and Ricky Bell and Jerry Eckwood were held to 72 yards rushing. Eckwood's fumble led to Atlanta's go-ahead touchdown with 11:10 remaining. Bubba Bean's 60-yard run with 1:22 remaining clinched the game for the Falcons. A 69-yard Williams-led drive brought the Buccaneers to within three points with 28 seconds left, but the Buccaneers failed to recover the ensuing onside kick.

==== Week 11: at Detroit Lions ====
Week Eleven: Tampa Bay Buccaneers at Detroit Lions – Game summary

| Quarter | 1 | 2 | 3 | 4 | Total |
|---|---|---|---|---|---|
| **Buccaneers** | 0 | 3 | 3 | 10 | **16** |
| Lions | 7 | 0 | 7 | 0 | **14** |

at Pontiac Silverdome, Pontiac, Michigan

- Date: November 11
- Game time: 1:00 p.m. EST
- Game weather: None (played indoors)
- Game attendance: 70,461
- Referee: Bob Frederic
- TV announcers (CBS): Curt Gowdy and Hank Stram

The Buccaneers' error-prone play, of which McKay said "we didn't play with very much intelligence", required a late comeback to defeat the 1–10 Lions. The Buccaneers scored 10 points and recovered two fumbles, all in the last four minutes, to pass the Lions and maintain their two-game division lead over the Chicago Bears. This was the Buccaneers' sixth come-from-behind win of the season and they finished with a 4-0 road record against division opponents. After Neil O'Donoghue's fourth-quarter field goal, Dewey Selmon forced a Detroit fumble that was recovered by Dana Nafziger at the Lions' 23-yard line. Doug Williams followed this with a 23-yard touchdown pass to Larry Mucker. Mucker, who earlier had been fined for missing the team bus to the stadium, beat close coverage from Walt Williams to make the catch.

==== Week 12: vs. New York Giants ====
Week Twelve: New York Giants at Tampa Bay Buccaneers – Game summary

| Quarter | 1 | 2 | 3 | 4 | Total |
|---|---|---|---|---|---|
| Giants | 0 | 0 | 3 | 0 | **3** |
| **Buccaneers** | 0 | 14 | 10 | 7 | **31** |

at Tampa Stadium, Tampa, Florida

- Date: November 18
- Game time: 4:00 p.m. EST
- Game attendance: 70,261
- Referee: Fred Wyant

The Buccaneers routed a Giants team that came in having won 5 of their past 6 games. Giants quarterback Phil Simms was sacked 5 times for 75 yards, intercepted twice, and gave up two fumbles. One Cecil Johnson-caused fumble was picked up by Dave Lewis and returned 39 yards for a touchdown. Both sides denied running up the score during either of the season's matchups, though the Tampa players were said to have approached this game as a grudge match. The game was mostly devoid of the trash-talking that had characterized the previous meeting, the Giants having little room for words. The Giants' 3 points was the lowest score allowed by the Buccaneers, and the Buccaneers had their second-highest point total with 31. The Buccaneers used a two-tight end set, providing additional blocking that helped spring Ricky Bell for 152 yards in three quarters of play. Bell spent the fourth quarter holding an ice pack "...to keep Ricky from getting a swollen head", joked coach McKay. The win left the Buccaneers with an NFC-best 9–3 record, ahead of McKay's 9–7 goal and the team's 5–11 record from 1978. The Times speculated that a 13–3 record was "plausible", because three of the four remaining games were at home and the fourth was against the weak 49ers.

==== Week 13: vs. Minnesota Vikings ====
Week Thirteen: Minnesota Vikings at Tampa Bay Buccaneers – Game summary

| Quarter | 1 | 2 | 3 | 4 | Total |
|---|---|---|---|---|---|
| **Vikings** | 0 | 14 | 9 | 0 | **23** |
| Buccaneers | 6 | 3 | 7 | 6 | **22** |

at Tampa Stadium, Tampa, Florida

- Date: November 25
- Game time: 1:00 p.m. EST
- Game weather: 75 °F (24 °C)
- Game attendance: 70,039
- Referee: Chuck Heberling
- TV announcers (CBS): Pat Summerall and John Madden
- Box score

Game information

**First quarter**

- TB – Ricky Bell 2-yard run (kick failed). Buccaneers 6–0.

**Second quarter**

- TB – Neil O'Donoghue 20-yard field goal. Buccaneers 9–0.
- MIN – Terry LeCount 21-yard pass from Tommy Kramer (Rick Danmeier kick). Buccaneers 9–7.
- MIN – Ahmad Rashad 32-yard pass from Tommy Kramer (Rick Danmeier kick). Vikings 14–9.

**Third quarter**

- MIN – Rick Danmeier 44-yard field goal. Vikings 17–9.
- TB – Johnny Davis 17-yard run (Neil O'Donoghue kick). Vikings 17–16.
- MIN – Rickey Young 3-yard pass from Tommy Kramer (kick failed). Vikings 23–16.

**Fourth quarter**

- TB – Doug Williams 13-yard run (kick failed). Vikings 23–22.

**Top passers**

- MIN – Tommy Kramer – 15/26, 158 yards, 3 TD
- TB – Doug Williams – 19/38, 242 yards

**Top rushers**

- MIN – Ted Brown – 12 rushes, 52 yards
- TB – Ricky Bell – 28 rushes, 101 yards, TD

**Top receivers**

- MIN – Ahmad Rashad – 6 receptions, 93 yards, TD
- TB – Morris Owens – 4 receptions, 66 yards

In a game that would have clinched the Buccaneers' first playoff berth, coach McKay was booed after a one-point loss in which three kick attempts were blocked. A touchdown drive by Doug Williams in which he ran the ball into the end zone with 19 seconds remaining turned out to be futile, as Wally Hilgenberg's blocked extra point left the Buccaneers one point short of tying the game. Various special teams miscues erased a good offensive day, in which Williams went 19 of 38 for 252 yards (including 5 of 7 for 52 yards and 25 yards rushing on the final drive), and Ricky Bell's 101 yards rushing put him over 1,000 for the season.

The Buccaneers' 182 rushing yards moved the team into first place overall in the NFC and second in the league after the Jets. The team had the sixth-best passing record in the conference, and the best pass defense and second-best rush defense. The Times nonetheless reported that the locker room was more subdued than during the 0–26 losing streak: "One by one, the players filed out grim-faced, reluctantly said a few words and then left". An angry McKay complained, "I'm sick and tired of people booing me. I wish they would boo the people who can't block", and had to issue a public apology after shouting an obscenity at the end zone stands, saying later that he was angry over racist statements being made from that direction. This was the first game that Pat Summerall and John Madden announced together.

==== Week 14: vs. Chicago Bears ====
Week Fourteen: Chicago Bears at Tampa Bay Buccaneers – Game summary

| Quarter | 1 | 2 | 3 | 4 | Total |
|---|---|---|---|---|---|
| **Bears** | 7 | 7 | 0 | 0 | **14** |
| Buccaneers | 0 | 0 | 0 | 0 | **0** |

at Tampa Stadium, Tampa, Florida

- Date: December 2
- Game time: 1:00 p.m. EST
- Game weather: 53 °F (12 °C)
- Game attendance: 69,508
- Referee: Fred Silva
- TV announcers (CBS): Tim Ryan and Johnny Morris
- Box score

Game information

**First quarter**

- CHI – Walter Payton 1-yard run (Bob Thomas kick). Bears 7–0.

**Second quarter**

- CHI – Dave Williams 13-yard pass from Mike Phipps (Bob Thomas kick). Bears 14–0.

**Third quarter**

- No scoring plays

**Fourth quarter**

- No scoring plays

**Top passers**

- CHI – Mike Phipps – 6/15, 26 yards, TD
- TB – Mike Rae – 6/12, 98 yards, INT

**Top rushers**

- CHI – Walter Payton – 22 rushes, 77 yards, TD
- TB – Ricky Bell – 24 rushes, 80 yards

**Top receivers**

- CHI – Dave Williams – 6 receptions, 26 yards, TD
- TB – Isaac Hagins – 4 receptions, 67 yards

Doug Williams completed only 5 of 19 passes for 60 yards with four interceptions before being pulled in favor of Mike Rae. Bears quarterback Mike Phipps completed six passes, all to Dave Williams. The Bears scored on one of those receptions, and on a Walter Payton run. The Buccaneers' Williams was nearly ejected from the game after throwing Bears lineman Mike Hartenstine to the ground by his face mask after a Gary Fencik interception. The Bears' five interceptions were their most against the Buccaneers. The Buccaneers' play was later described as "flat" by Bears players. Wally Chambers dismissed talk of the team's inexperience, noting the intensity with which the team had played against the Giants two weeks prior. The last time the Buccaneers had been shut out previous to this game was the last game of their 0–26 losing streak in 1977, also against the Bears.

==== Week 15: at San Francisco 49ers ====
Week Fifteen: Tampa Bay Buccaneers at San Francisco 49ers – Game summary

| Quarter | 1 | 2 | 3 | 4 | Total |
|---|---|---|---|---|---|
| Buccaneers | 0 | 7 | 0 | 0 | **7** |
| **49ers** | 10 | 3 | 0 | 10 | **23** |

at Candlestick Park, San Francisco, California

- Date: December 9
- Game time: 4:00 p.m. EST/1:00 p.m. PST
- Game weather: 52 °F (11 °C)
- Game attendance: 44,506
- Referee: Red Cashion
- Box score

Game information

**First quarter**

- SF – Mike Shumann 19-yard pass from Steve DeBerg (Ray Wersching kick). 49ers 7–0.
- SF – Ray Wersching 39-yard field goal. 49ers 10–0.

**Second quarter**

- TB – Jimmie Giles 19-yard pass from Doug Williams (Neil O'Donoghue kick). 49ers 10–7.
- SF – Ray Wersching 27-yard field goal. 49ers 13–7.

**Third quarter**

- No scoring plays

**Fourth quarter**

- SF – Lenvil Elliott 1-yard run (Ray Wersching kick). 49ers 20–7.
- SF – Ray Wersching 45-yard field goal. 49ers 23–7.

**Top passers**

- TB – Doug Williams – 10/24, 167 yards, TD, 5 INT
- SF – Steve DeBerg – 22/30, 186 yards, TD

**Top rushers**

- TB – Ricky Bell – 10 rushes, 36 yards
- SF – Wilbur Jackson – 8 receptions, 35 yards

**Top receivers**

- TB – Isaac Hagins – 3 receptions, 90 yards
- SF – Mike Shumann – 4 receptions, 61 yards, TD

Still needing only one victory to clinch the division, the Buccaneers lost to the San Francisco 49ers in O. J. Simpson's final home game. It was the second year in a row that the Buccaneers lost to a 49ers team that entered the game with a 1–13 record. The 49ers scored first, as Jeris White slipped while covering receiver Mike Shumann, leaving Shumann open for a 19-yard touchdown reception. The offense's single touchdown, a 19-yard pass from Doug Williams to Jimmie Giles, was a season low, while injuries to Mike Washington and Cedric Brown left the Buccaneers' secondary vulnerable. Mike Rae again saw duty at quarterback in the fourth quarter, with the game out of hand. Williams, who tearfully accepted blame for the loss, threw five interceptions that left McKay considering either benching him or avoiding pass plays. McKay also criticized the offensive line's blocking, saying that he "saw (Ricky) Bell make some long runs, maybe two or three inches". Under pressure of needing to win one game, the Buccaneers' tension ("state of shock", according to McKay) was noticeable to 49ers players.

The Associated Press called the game a "humiliating" loss against "13-time loser San Francisco", and Lewis described it as "choking". When reporters described the team as "Chokeneers" and a laughingstock, McKay denounced them and Lewis in what the news agency described an "obscenity-filled tirade", stating that "the word choke is terribly degrading. He ought to shut up ... and see how he played", and "People who use those ... terms are no better than snakes". The loss dropped the Buccaneers into a first-place tie with the Chicago Bears in the NFC Central, to which the Times said that the Buccaneers were "now in the process of presenting" the division championship.

==== Week 16: vs. Kansas City Chiefs ====
Week Sixteen: Kansas City Chiefs at Tampa Bay Buccaneers – Game summary

| Quarter | 1 | 2 | 3 | 4 | Total |
|---|---|---|---|---|---|
| Chiefs | 0 | 0 | 0 | 0 | **0** |
| **Buccaneers** | 0 | 0 | 0 | 3 | **3** |

at Tampa Stadium, Tampa, Florida

- Date: December 16
- Game time: 1:00 p.m.
- Game weather: Heavy rain, 67 °F (19 °C)
- Game attendance: 63,624
- Referee: Jerry Seeman
- TV announcers (NBC): Jay Randolph and Paul Maguire
- Box score

Game information

**First quarter**

- No scoring plays

**Second quarter**

- No scoring plays

**Third quarter**

- No scoring plays

**Fourth quarter**

- TB – Neil O'Donoghue 19-yard field goal. Buccaneers 3–0.

**Top passers**

- KC – Steve Fuller – 7/13, 46 yards, INT
- TB – Doug Williams – 5/13, 51 yards, 2 INT

**Top rushers**

- KC – Earl Gant – 6 rushes, 25 yards
- TB – Ricky Bell – 39 rushes, 137 yards

**Top receivers**

- KC – Earl Gant – 3 receptions, 24 yards
- TB – Jerry Eckwood – 2 receptions, 26 yards

Playing in a torrential downpour, the Buccaneers scored the first shutout in franchise history to clinch their first playoff berth and the NFC Central title in what would become known as "the Rain Bowl". The Chiefs were held to a franchise-low 80 yards of total offense. Despite the rain, Ricky Bell claimed that the field had better traction than the dry field they had played on the week previously in San Francisco. Bell carried the ball 39 times for 137 yards in such bad weather that the game had to be played under lights. The Buccaneers lost four previous scoring opportunities to a fumble, two interceptions, and a fumbled snap on a field goal attempt. Shut out of the end zone on three tries with first-and-goal from the 9-yard line, the Buccaneers brought in Neil O'Donoghue to kick what would be the winning field goal with 8:50 remaining. Tampa Bay would hold the ball for all but four plays for the rest of the game. The Chiefs players gave the Buccaneers little credit after the victory, saying that the AFC was superior to the NFC and that the Buccaneers would never have won the AFC West. While stating "you have to give credit where credit is due", Cal Peterson, a member of the first Buccaneers team, was among the Chiefs who agreed on the AFC's superiority. O'Donoghue admitted ("In my two years at Auburn, we won about three games") that he was playing on a championship team for the first time since youth soccer in Ireland, and linebacker Lewis said "We won't be called the Chokeneers any more".

=== Standings ===
NFC Central
| | W | L | T | PCT | DIV | CONF | PF | PA | STK |
|---|---|---|---|---|---|---|---|---|---|
| ^{(2)} Tampa Bay Buccaneers | 10 | 6 | 0 | .625 | 6–2 | 8–6 | 273 | 237 | W1 |
| ^{(5)} Chicago Bears | 10 | 6 | 0 | .625 | 5–3 | 8–4 | 306 | 249 | W3 |
| Minnesota Vikings | 7 | 9 | 0 | .438 | 5–3 | 6–6 | 259 | 337 | L1 |
| Green Bay Packers | 5 | 11 | 0 | .313 | 3–5 | 4–8 | 246 | 316 | W1 |
| Detroit Lions | 2 | 14 | 0 | .125 | 1–7 | 2–10 | 219 | 365 | L3 |

== Postseason ==
=== Schedule ===
| Round | Date | Opponent | Result | Record | Venue | Attendance |
|---|---|---|---|---|---|---|
| Divisional | December 29 | Philadelphia Eagles | W 24–17 | 11–6 | Tampa Stadium | 71,402 |
| Conference | January 6 | Los Angeles Rams | L 0–9 | 11–7 | Tampa Stadium | 72,033 |

=== NFC Divisional Playoffs: vs. (4) Philadelphia Eagles ===
NFC Divisional Playoffs: (4) Philadelphia Eagles at (2) Tampa Bay Buccaneers – Game summary

| Quarter | 1 | 2 | 3 | 4 | Total |
|---|---|---|---|---|---|
| Eagles | 0 | 7 | 3 | 7 | 17 |
| Buccaneers | 7 | 10 | 0 | 7 | 24 |

at Tampa Stadium, Tampa, Florida

- Date: December 29
- Game time: 12:30 EST
- Game weather: 60 °F (16 °C)
- Game attendance: 71,402
- Referee: Fred Silva
- TV announcers (CBS): Curt Gowdy and Hank Stram
- Box score

Game information

First quarter

- TB – Ricky Bell 4-yard run (Neil O'Donoghue kick). Buccaneers 7–0.

Second quarter

- TB – Neil O'Donoghue 40-yard field goal. Buccaneers 10–0.
- TB – Rickey Bell 1-yard run (Neil O'Donoghue kick). Buccaneers 17–0.
- PHI – Charlie Smith 11-yard pass from Ron Jaworski (Tony Franklin kick). Buccaneers 17–7.

Third quarter

- PHI – Tony Franklin 42-yard field goal. Buccaneers 17–10.

Fourth quarter

- TB – Jimmie Giles 9-yard pass from Doug Williams (Neil O'Donoghue kick). Buccaneers 24–10.
- PHI – Harold Carmichael 37-yard pass from Ron Jaworski (Tony Franklin kick). Buccaneers 24–17.

Top passers

- PHI – Ron Jaworski – 15/39, 199 yards, TD
- TB – Doug Williams – 7/15, 132 yards, TD, INT

Top rushers

- PHI – Wilbert Montgomery – 13 rushes, 35 yards
- TB – Ricky Bell – 38 rushes, 142 yards, 2 TD

Top receivers

- PHI – Harold Carmichael – 3 receptions, 92 yards, TD
- TB – Jimmie Giles – 3 receptions, 43 yards, TD

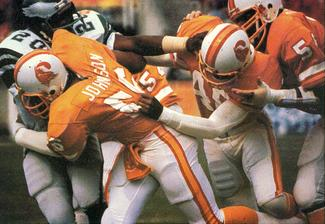
The Buccaneers stopping an Eagles rushing play during the 1979 NFC Divisional Playoff Game.

The Buccaneers won their first playoff game in team history by holding the Eagles to 48 rushing yards, while running back Ricky Bell recorded 142 rushing yards and 2 touchdowns. Bell's 38 rushing attempts set a playoff record, tied later by John Riggins in Super Bowl XVII, while the Eagles' Wilbert Montgomery was held to 35 yards on 12 attempts. The Buccaneers' opening drive resulted in a Bell touchdown, and a Neil O'Donoghue field goal gave the Buccaneers an early 10–0 lead. Wally Chambers forced a Montgomery fumble that was recovered by Randy Crowder on the 4-yard line and led to Bell's second touchdown run, giving the Buccaneers a 17–0 second-quarter lead. Trying to extend that lead before halftime, Doug Williams hurried a pass that wound up in the hands of Eagles linebacker Jerry Robinson at the Tampa Bay 11-yard line. This set up Ron Jaworski's touchdown pass to Charles Smith. After the Eagles narrowed the gap to 17–10 on a Tony Franklin field goal, a series of Lee Roy Selmon sacks of Jaworski killed the Eagles' rally. A 9-yard touchdown pass to Jimmie Giles completed the Buccaneers' scoring. It was only in the final minutes of the game that the Eagles were able to put together a long drive, ending in a touchdown pass to Harold Carmichael. The Buccaneers held the ball for over 36 minutes of the game. The Buccaneers' defensive strategy revolved around stopping Carmichael and Montgomery. At one point, when Leroy Harris was gang-tackled following a short reception, the entire Buccaneer defense was penalized for unnecessary roughing. The Buccaneers' hard-hitting play intimidated the Eagles' receivers into dropping 10 passes. Going into the matchup, the Eagles were expected to have edges in playoff and quarterback experience. Jaworski was the third-rated quarterback in the NFC, while Williams had the lowest rating of all NFC starting quarterbacks. The game represented a rematch of old coaching rivals, McKay of USC and Dick Vermeil of UCLA. The game was the Buccaneers' first on national television. Word of the upset spread as far as Iran, where the hostages were surprised to learn of the Buccaneers' contention for the Super Bowl.

=== NFC Championship: vs. (3) Los Angeles Rams ===
NFC Championship: (3) Los Angeles Rams at (2) Tampa Bay Buccaneers – Game summary

| Quarter | 1 | 2 | 3 | 4 | Total |
|---|---|---|---|---|---|
| Rams | 0 | 6 | 0 | 3 | 9 |
| Buccaneers | 0 | 0 | 0 | 0 | 0 |

at Tampa Stadium, Tampa, Florida

- Date: January 6, 1980
- Game time: 5:00 p.m. EST
- Game weather: 45 °F (7 °C)
- Game attendance: 72,033
- Referee: Pat Haggerty
- TV announcers (CBS): Pat Summerall and Tom Brookshier
- Box score

Game information

First quarter

- No scoring plays

Second quarter

- LA – Frank Corral 19-yard field goal. Rams 3–0.
- LA – Frank Corral 21-yard field goal. Rams 6–0.

Third quarter

- No scoring plays

Fourth quarter

- LA – Frank Corral 23-yard field goal. Rams 9–0.

Top passers

- LA – Vince Ferragamo – 12/23, 163 yards
- TB – Mike Rae – 2/13, 42 yards

Top rushers

- LA – Cullen Bryant – 18 rushes, 106 yards
- TB – Rickey Bell – 20 rushes, 59 yards

Top receivers

- LA – Preston Dennard – 3 receptions, 56 yards
- TB – Larry Mucker – 1 reception, 42 yards

The Los Angeles Rams, who had been hobbled by injuries much of the season, entered the playoffs with the worst record (9–7) of the six division winners. Rams defensive end Jack Youngblood played the game with a hairline fracture of his left leg, and Vince Ferragamo continued to start in place of the injured Pat Haden. On the other side of the ball, the Buccaneers lost Lee Roy Selmon and Cecil Johnson with ankle injuries, Doug Williams with a torn bicep, and Wally Chambers with a knee injury. Mike Washington and Dave Lewis also missed part of the game with injuries. The game was the Rams' second consecutive playoff win against a team that had beaten them decisively during the regular season. Each team had a touchdown called back due to a penalty. The Rams also had a touchdown called back when it was ruled that receiver Preston Dennard did not maintain possession of the ball. The Rams offensive line was intact, unlike in the regular-season matchup. This provided for 216 yards rushing and gave Ferragamo much time to complete passes. Another change from the earlier game was that Wendell Tyler had become the starting halfback for the Rams. With Tyler's speed enabling the Rams to run outside, the Buccaneers were no longer able to clog the inside lanes with defenders and put the linebackers into coverage on passing downs. The Buc defense's focus on Tyler freed Cullen Bryant to run for 106 yards on 18 carries. Meanwhile, Buc quarterbacks Williams and Mike Rae were 4–26 on pass attempts. It took until the third quarter for the Buccaneers to even pass midfield, on a halfback option pass from Jerry Eckwood to Larry Mucker.

== Awards and honors ==
- Lee Roy Selmon, National Football League Defensive Player of the Year Award
- Lee Roy Selmon, NFL Defensive Lineman of the Year
- Lee Roy Selmon, Pro Bowl selection
- Lee Roy Selmon, Associated Press, Pro Football Weekly, Newspaper Enterprise Association, Pro Football Writers Association All-Pro First Team selection
- Lee Roy Selmon, Pro Football Weekly, The Sporting News, UPI First Team All-NFC
- Dave Lewis, UPI First Team All-NFC, Second Team All-NFL
- Dewey Selmon, Associated Press Second Team All-NFL
- Greg Roberts, NFL All-Rookie team
- Ricky Bell, team MVP
- John McKay, Football News Coach of the Year
- The entire offensive line was honored by the National Football League Players Association as a symbol of unity in strength, for leading the NFL in fewest sacks allowed (12)
