= Gordon Jones (American football) =

American football player (born 1957)

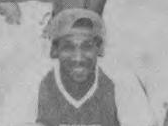
- Jones, c. 1982

No. 84, 25
- Position: Wide receiver

Personal information
- Born: July 25, 1957 (age 69); Buffalo, New York, U.S.
- Listed height: 6 ft 0 in (1.83 m)
- Listed weight: 190 lb (86 kg)

Career information
- College: Pittsburgh
- NFL draft: 1979: 2nd round, 34th overall pick

Career history
- Tampa Bay Buccaneers (1979–1982); Los Angeles Rams (1983–1984)

Awards and highlights
- National champion (1976); First-team All-American (1978); Third-team All-American (1977); 2× First-team All-East (1977, 1978)

Career NFL statistics
- Receptions: 94
- Receiving yards: 1,402
- Touchdowns: 8
- Stats at Pro Football Reference

Gordon Jones (born July 25, 1957) is an American former professional football player who was a wide receiver for five seasons for the Tampa Bay Buccaneers and Los Angeles Rams. He played college football for the Pittsburgh Panthers.

== College career ==
Jones was recruited out of East Allegheny high school to play for Johnny Majors and the University of Pittsburgh. The Pitt Panthers of the late 1970's were one of the top programs in the country and some of those players, besides Jones, that would go one to NFL careers include Tony Dorsett, and Matt Cavanaugh. In 1975, Jones played in 12 games, he caught 22 passes for 384 yards and four touchdown passes. That season, Pittsburgh finished ranked 15th in the national and defeated Kansas in the Sun Bowl. 1976 proved to be an odd year stats wise for Jones. He caught one less pass, but for one more yard and one more touchdown than he'd had the previous season.

1977 was a break out year for Jones. He finished 5th in the national with 45 receptions. His nine touchdown receptions also put him in the top ten in the nation, as he finished seventh. He also had four kick off returns for a touchdown, which put him at number one. He also played in the Gator Bowl, as Pittsburgh crushed Clemson 34-3. In Jones' senior year, he again caught 45 passes, this time for 666 yards and just three touchdown receptions.

== Pro career ==
The Tampa Bay Buccaneers selected Jones in the second round on the 1979 NFL draft (34th player selected overall). Much of Jones' rookie season was spent on the bench, as he was buried on the depth chart by Morris Owens, Larry Mucker and Isaac Hagins, the team's seasons vets. Jones only started one game, and finished the season with four receptions for 80- yards and one touchdown. He played in the NFC Championship against the Los Angeles Rams, but did not catch a pass. The next season Tampa Bay overhauled their receiving core. Owens was let go, and rookie Kevin House took his place on the roster. Jones started in 14 games, caught 48 passes for 668 yards and five touchdowns, in what be his best season as a pro. With Kevin House emerging as the go to receiver for Tampa Bay, Jones settled into the role as the number two receiver. He started few games over the next two seasons, as Gerald Carter (acquired from the Jets) and Theo Bell, acquired from the Pittsburgh Steelers reduced Jones' workload. After the 1982 season, was finished, Jones moved on from Tampa Bay to play for the Rams. Jones caught 11 passes for 172 yards for the Rams, but the offense was centered around running back Eric Dickerson.

== NFL career statistics ==
Legend
**Bold**	Career high

Year	Team	Games		Receiving				
Year	Team	GP	GS	Rec	Yds	Avg	Lng	TD
1979	TAM	12	1	4	80	**20.0**	37	1
1980	TAM	**16**	**14**	**48**	**669**	13.9	41	**5**
1981	TAM	13	4	20	276	13.8	44	1
1982	TAM	9	7	14	205	14.6	26	1
1983	LAR	11	0	11	172	15.6	**46**	0
		61	26	97	1,402	14.5	46	8

== Post NFL career ==
As of 2011, Gordon Jones had returned to the city of Tampa and worked as a Respiratory Therapist.
