= Jerry Eckwood =

American football player (born 1954)

No. 43
- Position: Running back

Personal information
- Born: December 26, 1954 (age 71); Brinkley, Arkansas, U.S.
- Listed height: 6 ft 0 in (1.83 m)
- Listed weight: 198 lb (90 kg)

Career information
- High school: Brinkley (AR)
- College: Arkansas
- NFL draft: 1979: 3rd round, 60th overall pick

Career history
- Tampa Bay Buccaneers (1979–1981)

Awards and highlights
- 2× Second-team All-SWC (1975, 1978)

Career NFL statistics
- Rushing yards: 1,845
- Rushing average: 3.6
- Rushing touchdowns: 6
- Stats at Pro Football Reference

Jerry Louis Eckwood (born December 26, 1954) is a former NFL running back. He played for the Tampa Bay Buccaneers from 1979 to 1981, and was a key member of the Buccaneers team that made the first playoff appearance in franchise history in 1979. Eckwood played collegiately for the Arkansas Razorbacks from 1975 to 1978.

== Early life ==
Eckwood was a highly recruited running back out of Brinkley, Arkansas, rushing for 2616 yards in 1973. He was signed to an athletic scholarship with the Arkansas Razorbacks by then-head coach Frank Broyles.

== Collegiate career ==
Eckwood played for the Razorbacks from 1975 to 1978, and was a three-year letterman ('75, '76, '78), playing both for Broyles and Lou Holtz. Eckwood was named 1st Team All Southwest Conference in 1975, rushing for 792 yards on 104 carries. His 7.62 yards per carry that season remained a school record until it was broken by Felix Jones in 2007. Eckwood had six 100-yard rushing games in his Razorback career, five of those games occurring in 1975.

== NFL career ==
=== 1979 Season ===
Eckwood was taken 60th overall in the third round of the 1979 NFL draft by the Tampa Bay Buccaneers, ahead of notable players such as Pro Football Hall of Famer Joe Montana and Pro Bowlers Kenny King, William Andrews, and Tony Franklin. Eckwood shared the backfield with quarterback Doug Williams and running back Ricky Bell. In 1979, Eckwood was the Buccaneers' second- leading rusher with 690 yards on 194 carries. He was, at the time, one of only 11 running backs to have gained 100 yards in his first professional game. Tampa Bay made the first playoff appearance in franchise history in 1979, advancing to the NFC Championship Game, where they lost to the Los Angeles Rams 9–0. Eckwood's 42-yard option pass to Larry Mucker was the Bucs' longest play of the game.

=== 1980 Season ===
In 1980, Eckwood was again second in rushing with 504 yards, and was also second on the team with 47 receptions. He fell into some disfavor during this season, after fumbling at key points of four of the team's losses.

=== 1981 Season ===
In 1981, Eckwood led the Buccaneers in rushing with 651 yards on 172 carries (3.8 avg.). In Eckwood's final NFL season, Tampa Bay finished with a 9–7 record, losing in the first round of the 1981 NFL playoffs to the Dallas Cowboys. Eckwood rushed 515 times for 1845 yards (3.6 avg.) and six touchdowns in his 3-year NFL career and was the starter in 30 of the 47 games he played in, all with the Buccaneers. He also caught 93 passes for 956 yards (10.3 avg.) and one touchdown.

== NFL career statistics ==
Legend
**Bold**	Career high

=== Regular season ===
Year	Team	Games		Rushing					Receiving				
Year	Team	GP	GS	Att	Yds	Avg	Lng	TD	Rec	Yds	Avg	Lng	TD
1979	TAM	**16**	10	**194**	**690**	3.6	**61**	**2**	22	268	**12.2**	31	0
1980	TAM	15	8	149	504	3.4	35	**2**	**47**	**475**	10.1	**40**	**1**
1981	TAM	**16**	**12**	172	651	**3.8**	59	**2**	24	213	8.9	33	0
		47	30	515	1,845	3.6	61	6	93	956	10.3	40	1

=== Playoffs ===
Year	Team	Games		Rushing					Receiving				
Year	Team	GP	GS	Att	Yds	Avg	Lng	TD	Rec	Yds	Avg	Lng	TD
1979	TAM	**2**	**1**	**10**	**24**	**2.4**	**8**	0	0	0	0.0	0	0
1981	TAM	1	0	4	2	0.5	6	0	0	0	0.0	0	0
		3	1	14	26	1.9	8	0	0	0	0.0	0	0

== Post-career ==
=== Legacy ===
Eckwood was selected the 79th greatest player in Buccaneer history in 2007. Eckwood's nephew, LaDarius Eckwood is a wide receiver who played football with the University of Arkansas-Pine Bluff Golden Lions after catching 108 passes in the 2008 season for Springdale High School.

=== Concussion issues ===
Eckwood suffered several concussions while playing in college and in the NFL. Since leaving the NFL, Eckwood has struggled with mental illness, and was committed to the Arkansas State Hospital for several years. He currently has dementia, and is housed in an assisted living facility. Former Buccaneers president Gay Culverhouse has assisted with his medical care and has cited him as an example of the mistreatment NFL players receive from their employers. Culverhouse recalled warning signs of Eckwood's future mental problems, citing times where he went to the wrong huddle or bench during games. Eckwood, who can no longer drive or live on his own, was approved to participate in the 88 Plan, an NFL program for former players suffering from various dementia-related symptoms, such as hallucinations, forgetfulness, paranoia, and the inability to process new information. Eckwood was also approved by the NFL to receive annual benefits of $136,000 for the remainder of his life.

== See also ==
- Arkansas Razorbacks football
- Lou Holtz
- Tampa Bay Buccaneers
- Concussions in American football
