= Andy Hawkins (American football) =

American football player (1958–2015)

No. 59
- Position: Linebacker

Personal information
- Born: March 31, 1958; Bay City, Texas, U.S.
- Died: October 7, 2015 (aged 57)
- Listed height: 6 ft 2 in (1.88 m)
- Listed weight: 225 lb (102 kg)

Career information
- High school: Van Vleck (Van Vleck, Texas)
- College: Texas A&M-Kingsville
- NFL draft: 1980: 10th round, 267th overall pick

Career history
- Tampa Bay Buccaneers (1980–1983); Houston Gamblers (1984–1985); San Diego Chargers (1986–1987); Kansas City Chiefs (1988)

Career NFL statistics
- Sacks: 7.3
- Fumble recoveries: 5
- Stats at Pro Football Reference

Anthony James Hawkins (March 31, 1958 – October 7, 2015) was an American professional football linebacker in the National Football League (NFL). He was selected by the Tampa Bay Buccaneers in the 10th round of the 1980 NFL draft. He played college football at Texas A&M-Kingsville. Hawkins had 5.3 career sacks, and is the one of only three players in the history of the NFL to accomplish this (the others being the other two players involved in the sack: David Logan and Hugh Green). While playing for the Buccaneers in a 23–17 win against the Miami Dolphins on November 29, 1982, Hawkins was one of three players to sack quarterback Don Strock, and it was subsequently decided to award each of the three tacklers one third of a sack.

Hawkins brother Mike also played in the NFL for the New England Patriots.

Hawkins died on October 7, 2015, at St. Luke's Episcopal Hospital, in Houston, Texas.
