= Jimmie Giles =

American football player (born 1954)

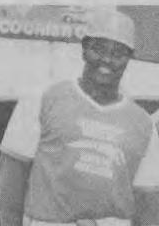
- Giles c. 1982

No. 88, 81, 83
- Position: Tight end

Personal information
- Born: November 8, 1954 (age 71); Greenville, Mississippi, U.S.
- Listed height: 6 ft 3 in (1.91 m)
- Listed weight: 239 lb (108 kg)

Career information
- High school: Greenville
- College: Alcorn State (1973–1976)
- NFL draft: 1977: 3rd round, 70th overall pick

Career history
- Houston Oilers (1977); Tampa Bay Buccaneers (1978–1986); Detroit Lions (1986–1987); Philadelphia Eagles (1987–1989)

Awards and highlights
- 4× Pro Bowl (1980–1982, 1985); Tampa Bay Buccaneers Ring of Honor

Career NFL statistics
- Receptions: 350
- Receiving yards: 5,084
- Receiving touchdowns: 41
- Stats at Pro Football Reference

Jimmie Giles Jr. (born November 8, 1954) is an American former professional football player who was a tight end in the National Football League (NFL) for four teams, primarily with the Tampa Bay Buccaneers.

== College career ==
He played college football at Alcorn State University.

== Professional career ==
He was selected by the Houston Oilers in the third round of the 1977 NFL draft. The 6-foot-3-inch (1.91 m), 238-pound (108 kg) Giles played in 13 NFL seasons from 1977 to 1989. A four-time Pro Bowl selection, Giles's career flourished as a member of the Tampa Bay Buccaneers during the early and mid-1980s, despite being used mainly as a blocker during several seasons in which he fell into disfavor with the coaching staff.

Giles' benching coincided with a training-camp holdout, the first in Buccaneers history by a player under contract, and the difficult Doug Williams negotiations that resulted in his departure for the USFL. Giles' four touchdowns against the Miami Dolphins on October 20, 1985, tied Earl Campbell's record for the most touchdowns by a Dolphins opponent, and is still (as of 2017) the Buccaneers' single-game record; despite this, the Dolphins would win 41–38. Dolphins coach Don Shula said of the performance, "I can't remember any tight end dominating us that way". Buccaneer teammate Gerald Carter said that Giles could have been "one of the best all-time tight ends, if they'd used him more". In 1988 with the Philadelphia Eagles, he caught a touchdown from quarterback Randall Cunningham on a memorable play during Monday Night Football. On that play, Cunningham escaped a tackle from Giants linebacker Carl Banks and threw a touchdown to Giles.

On July 13, 2011, the Buccaneers officially announced that Jimmie Giles would be inducted into the team's Ring of Honor on December 4, 2011, when the Buccaneers hosted the Carolina Panthers.

== NFL career statistics ==
Legend
**Bold**	Career high

=== Regular season ===
Year	Team	Games		Receiving				
Year	Team	GP	GS	Rec	Yds	Avg	Lng	TD
1977	HOU	14	4	17	147	8.6	17	0
1978	TAM	16	10	23	324	14.1	38	2
1979	TAM	16	16	40	579	14.5	66	7
1980	TAM	16	15	33	602	**18.2**	51	4
1981	TAM	16	16	**45**	**786**	17.5	**81**	6
1982	TAM	9	9	28	499	17.8	48	3
1983	TAM	11	9	25	349	14.0	80	1
1984	TAM	14	14	24	310	12.9	38	2
1985	TAM	16	16	43	673	15.7	44	**8**
1986	TAM	7	7	18	178	9.9	20	1
1986	DET	9	8	19	198	10.4	30	3
1987	DET	4	1	6	62	10.3	25	0
1987	PHI	8	0	7	95	13.6	40	1
1988	PHI	16	1	6	57	9.5	17	1
1989	PHI	16	5	16	225	14.1	66	2
		188	131	350	5,084	14.5	81	41

=== Postseason ===
Year	Team	Games		Receiving				
Year	Team	GP	GS	Rec	Yds	Avg	Lng	TD
1979	TAM	2	2	**3**	43	14.3	18	**1**
1981	TAM	1	1	2	**98**	**49.0**	**75**	0
1982	TAM	1	1	1	7	7.0	7	0
1988	PHI	1	0	0	0	0.0	0	0
1989	PHI	1	0	0	0	0.0	0	0
		6	4	6	148	24.7	75	1
