= Tom Blanchard =

American football player (born 1948)

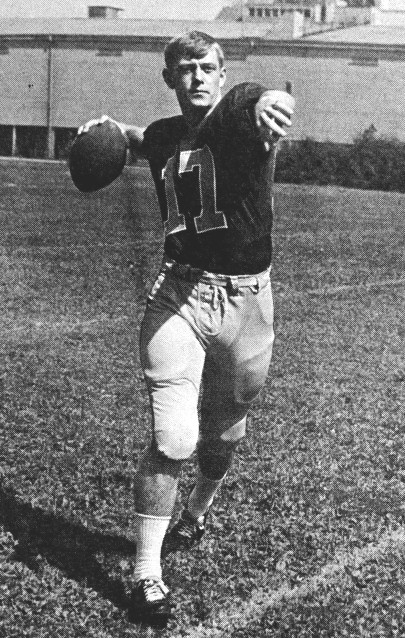
- Blanchard in 1967

No. 15, 16
- Position: Punter

Personal information
- Born: May 28, 1948 (age 78); Grants Pass, Oregon, U.S.
- Listed height: 6 ft 0 in (1.83 m)
- Listed weight: 190 lb (86 kg)

Career information
- High school: Grants Pass
- College: Oregon
- NFL draft: 1971: 12th round, 304th overall pick

Career history
- New York Giants (1971–1973); New Orleans Saints (1974–1978); Tampa Bay Buccaneers (1979–1981)

Awards and highlights
- NFL Punting Yards Leader (1975); NFL Total Punts Leader (1976); NFC Conference Punting Average Leader (1977)

Career NFL statistics
- Punts: 819
- Punt yards: 33,794
- Longest punt: 71
- Stats at Pro Football Reference

Thomas Richard Blanchard (born May 28, 1948) was an American professional football player who was a punter and holder for 11 seasons in the National Football League (NFL) with the New York Giants, New Orleans Saints, and Tampa Bay Buccaneers. He played college football for the Oregon Ducks.

== Early life and college ==
Blanchard was born and raised in Grants Pass, Oregon. He was a three-sport athlete, and led Grants Pass High School to the 1964 state high school football championship as a junior. After graduating, his standout performance in baseball led to him being drafted by the New York Yankees. Instead, he chose to play college football at the University of Oregon from 1967 to 1971, where he served as both quarterback and punter. Blanchard played quarterback until 1970, where he suffered a torn ACL in the second game of the season and was replaced by Dan Fouts. After returning from injury, he continued to play as a punter.

== Professional career ==
=== New York Giants (1971-1973) ===
Blanchard was selected 304th overall by the New York Giants in 12th round of the 1971 NFL draft. He stated, "I was shocked that I was selected at all," adding that his dream was to become a quarterback in the NFL. He immediately became the team's primary punter, demonstrating solid hang time and consistent kicking. His average of 40.6 yards per punt was comparable to most NFL punters at the time. He also served as the Giants' holder on field goals. During his tenure, only two of his punts were blocked, and his longest punt measured 62 yards in 1973, earning him a strong reputation with the team. Over three seasons with the Giants, he averaged 41.7 yards per punt, and recorded 169 punts. He was beaten out for the punting position during the 1974 preseason by rookie Dave Jennings and was subsequently waived.

=== New Orleans Saints (1974-1978) ===
Blanchard's tenure in New Orleans was essentially his best period in the NFL. After being released by the Giants, Blanchard was signed by the Saints for one game in the 1974 season after the Saints waived their opening-day punter, Donnie Gibbs, following a fumbled snap that contributed to the team’s first loss of the season. He went on to establish himself as one of the league's more dependable punters, eventually topping the list for the most punts by a Saints punter all-time. Blanchard was a member of the 1974 NFC All-Pro 2nd team. Over his four seasons with New Orleans, he posted some of the best numbers of his career. In 1974, he recorded a 71-yard punt, the longest by any punter that season. In 1975, he led the NFL with 3,776 punting yards, and in 1976, he led the league with 101 punts. In 1977, he threw a 3 yard, touchdown pass to Elois Grooms, a defensive end, on a fake field goal. Over his five years with the Saints, he averaged 41.4 yards per punt, punted 447 times, and threw one passing touchdown.

=== Tampa Bay Buccaneers (1979-1981) ===
He was traded by the Saints to the Buccaneers for a draft pick before the 1979 season, after the Saints drafted placekicker Russell Erxleben, who was also able to punt, in the first round of the 1979 NFL draft. Blanchard said, "I was kind of nervous," going into the first game of the season which was against the Saints. Tampa Bay, an expansion team from 1976 that had struggled in recent years, put together an impression 1979 season, and made the playoffs. Blanchard averaged 39.5 yards per punt, with a season long of 64 yards, punting 92 times.

The 1980 season would be Blanchard's last full season. The team struggled to a 5-10-1 record, and he punted 87 times, averaging 39.3 yards per punt, with a longest of 58 yarder. The 1981 season proved to be his final in the NFL. He opened the season strong, posting a career personal best average of 47 yards per punt in Week 1 against the Minnesota Vikings. However, in Week 2 against the Kansas City Chiefs, a bad snap on 4th down forced Blanchard to attempt a scramble with the ball, and multiple defenders wrapped him up in the tackle. This play appeared to leave him shaken, and he later fumbled in the 4th quarter. It is not official that he was injured in Week 2, as he continued to play in Week 3, but that game would be his last. In his final appearance, he punted 5 times for just 181 yards, a 36.2-yard average. Blanchard was later listed with a strained hamstring on the injury report, and soon after, while recovering, he was waived by the Buccaneers on October 20th, 1981, with Larry Swider taking his job in the interim.

=== Legacy ===
Tom Blanchard came to be regarded as a punter who received limited publicity but was very strong at his position. Throughout his career, Blanchard played in 148 games, recorded 819 punts for 33,794 yards, averaged 41.3 yards per punt, with his longest recorded punt at 71 yards, showing highlights of a reliable eleven-season career in the NFL.

== Personal life ==
His two sons, Tommy (the eldest) and Jimmy (five years the junior) both were starting quarterbacks at Grants Pass High School and led their respective teams to the playoffs. Tommy's son, Jace, also played quarterback at Grants Pass High School. After retiring as a player, Blanchard spent time as the football coach, softball coach, and athletic director at Grants Pass High School. He retired from these positions in 2013, and resides in Grants Pass, Oregon.

== NFL career statistics ==
Legend
	Led the league
**Bold**	Career high

=== Regular season ===
Year	Team	Punting									
Year	Team	GP	Punts	Yds	Net Yds	Lng	Avg	Net Avg	Blk	Ins20	TB
1971	NYG	14	66	2,681	2,302	57	40.6	**34.9**	0	-	3
1972	NYG	14	47	2,006	1,655	58	**42.7**	34.5	1	-	9
1973	NYG	14	56	2,347	1,837	62	41.9	32.2	1	-	7
1974	NOR	13	88	3,704	2,652	**71**	42.1	30.1	0	-	8
1975	NOR	14	92	3,776	2,781	61	41.0	29.3	**3**	-	16
1976	NOR	14	**101**	**3,974**	**3,132**	63	39.3	31.0	0	14	5
1977	NOR	14	82	3,474	2,650	66	42.4	31.5	2	11	11
1978	NOR	**16**	84	3,532	2,793	61	42.0	32.5	2	15	10
1979	TAM	**16**	93	3,679	2,909	58	39.6	30.6	2	14	**25**
1980	TAM	**16**	88	3,722	2,953	62	42.3	33.2	1	**18**	12
1981	TAM	3	22	899	600	58	40.9	27.3	0	4	2
Career		148	819	33,794	26,264	71	41.3	31.6	12	76	108

=== Playoffs ===
Year	Team	Punting									
Year	Team	GP	Punts	Yds	Net Yds	Lng	Avg	Net Avg	Blk	Ins20	TB
1979	TAM	**2**	**13**	**510**	**375**	**53**	**39.2**	**28.8**	0	**2**	**1**
Career		2	13	510	375	53	39.2	28.8	0	2	1
