= Dana Nafziger =

American football player (born 1953)

No. 83, 51
- Position: Tight end / Linebacker

Personal information
- Born: October 26, 1953 (age 73); Woodstock, Illinois, U.S.
- Listed height: 6 ft 1 in (1.85 m)
- Listed weight: 220 lb (100 kg)

Career information
- High school: Western (Anaheim, California)
- College: Cal Poly
- NFL draft: 1977: undrafted

Career history
- Tampa Bay Buccaneers (1977–1982)

Career NFL statistics
- Receptions: 9
- Receiving yards: 119
- Fumble recoveries: 4
- Stats at Pro Football Reference

Dana Albert Nafziger (born October 26, 1953) is an American former professional football player who played five seasons with the Tampa Bay Buccaneers of the National Football League (NFL).

== Early life ==
Nafziger was born on October 26, 1953, in Woodstock, Illinois. He attended Western High School in Anaheim, California.

== College career ==
Playing college football at California Polytechnic State University, Nafziger was recognized as a skilled blocking tight end and graduated with 63 career catches for 892 yards and seven touchdowns.

Following his senior season of 1976, he earned all-conference accolades from the CCAA as well as AP Little All-America status.

== Professional career ==
Nafziger was signed by Tampa Bay in September 1977. While originally worked out as a prospective linebacker, the Buccaneers soon moved him to tight end and also utilized him heavily on special teams. He was part of the 1979 Tampa Bay squad which advanced to the NFC Championship Game, producing two sacks and a pair of fumble recoveries for the Central Division champions that fall.

During the 1981 season, as the franchise again made the playoffs, Nafziger led the club with 22 special teams tackles for the year.
