= Cedric Brown =

American football player (born 1954)

No. 21, 34
- Position: Safety

Personal information
- Born: May 6, 1954 (age 72); Columbus, Ohio, U.S.
- Listed height: 6 ft 1 in (1.85 m)
- Listed weight: 199 lb (90 kg)

Career information
- High school: Linden-McKinley (OH)
- College: Kent State
- NFL draft: 1976: 12th round, 343rd overall pick

Career history
- Tampa Bay Buccaneers (1976–1984)

Career NFL statistics
- Interceptions: 29
- Fumble recoveries: 4
- Defensive TDs: 3
- Stats at Pro Football Reference

Cedric Wallace Brown Jr. (born May 6, 1954), is an American former professional football player who played in 8 NFL seasons from 1976 to 1984 for the Tampa Bay Buccaneers.
