= Cecil Johnson (American football) =

American football player (born 1955)

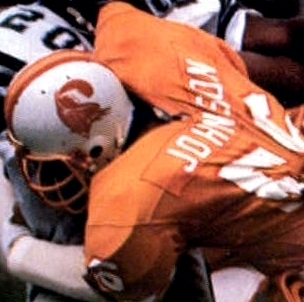
- Johnson playing for the Buccaneers in 1979

No. 56
- Position: Linebacker

Personal information
- Born: August 19, 1955 (age 71); Miami, Florida, U.S.
- Listed height: 6 ft 2 in (1.88 m)
- Listed weight: 230 lb (104 kg)

Career information
- High school: Miami Jackson
- College: Pittsburgh
- NFL draft: 1977: undrafted

Career history
- Tampa Bay Buccaneers (1977–1985)

Awards and highlights
- National champion (1976); First-team All-East (1976)

Career NFL statistics
- Interceptions: 9
- Fumble recoveries: 11
- Sacks: 9.5
- Stats at Pro Football Reference

Cecil Ellord Johnson (born August 19, 1955) is an American former professional football player who was a linebacker for nine seasons with the Tampa Bay Buccaneers of the National Football League (NFL). He played college football for the Pittsburgh Panthers. His brother Robert was a drummer for KC and the Sunshine Band.
