= Greg Horton =

American football player (1951–2016)

No. 63, 64
- Position: Guard

Personal information
- Born: January 1, 1951; San Bernardino, California, U.S.
- Died: November 11, 2016 (aged 65); Redlands, California, U.S.
- Listed height: 6 ft 4 in (1.93 m)
- Listed weight: 245 lb (111 kg)

Career information
- High school: Redlands (CA)
- College: Colorado
- NFL draft: 1974: 3rd round, 56th overall pick

Career history
- Los Angeles Rams (1976–1978); Tampa Bay Buccaneers (1978-1979); Los Angeles Rams (1980); Boston Breakers (1983)

Awards and highlights
- First-team All-Big Eight (1973)

Career NFL statistics
- Games played: 63
- Games started: 34
- Fumble recoveries: 2
- Stats at Pro Football Reference

Gregory Keith Horton (January 1, 1951 – November 11, 2016) was an American professional football player who played offensive lineman for the Los Angeles Rams and Tampa Bay Buccaneers.

Horton was traded to the Buccaneers in the 1978 season, where he would play both sides of the line; first the left guard, and finish the season as the right guard position. After that, he would soon be a member of the "Worst to First" ride of the Bucs, from 0-26 expansion losers to 10 points away from a Super Bowl; in only 4 years.

Unlike previous years, the 1979 Tampa Bay Buccaneers came into the season with two important things; A 4th Ranked Defense in 1978, and a Quarterback named Doug Williams who was capable of throwing the ball downfield. In hindsight however, the greatest asset of the 1979 Bucs was their Offensive Line. Anchored by Left Tackle Dave Reavis, Super Bowl winning lineman from the Pittsburgh Steelers, and Horton at Left Guard, the line blocked the Buccaneers offense into history. Only Right Tackle Charlie Hannah missed any time, not able to play the final two games of the regular season and first playoff game. It was this continuity that propelled running back Ricky Bell to a 1200+ yard rushing season, the 8th ranked of the season.

Behind the Offensive Line, QB Williams was only sacked 12 times, in a 16-game season. Winning their first ever NFC Central Division Championship, The Offensive Line opened holes in the playoffs for Ricky Bell's 38 rushing attempts for 142 yards, setting an NFL playoff record for most attempts! Suddenly these young Bucs found themselves hosting an NFC Championship game. Tampa Bay ended up losing to the Los Angeles Rams, Horton's former team. The next season Tampa Bay used a draft pick to select Ray Snell out of Oklahoma as a Guard. Horton was cut during the 1980 Training Camp.
