= Gene Sanders =

American football player (born 1956)

No. 74
- Position: Offensive lineman

Personal information
- Born: November 10, 1956 (age 69); New Orleans, Louisiana, U.S.
- Listed height: 6 ft 3 in (1.91 m)
- Listed weight: 273 lb (124 kg)

Career information
- High school: West Jefferson (Harvey, Louisiana)
- College: Texas A&M; Washington
- NFL draft: 1979: 8th round, 217th overall pick

Career history
- Tampa Bay Buccaneers (1979–1985)

Career NFL statistics
- Games played: 77
- Games started: 40
- Fumble recoveries: 1
- Stats at Pro Football Reference

Eugene Sanders (born November 10, 1956) is an American former professional football player who was an offensive lineman in the National Football League (NFL). He played college football for the Texas A&M Aggies and Washington Huskies. He was selected by the Tampa Bay Buccaneers in the eighth round of the 1979 NFL draft.

Sanders retired from pro football due to a shoulder injury. He later worked in management for Xerox and the YMCA, as well as being ordained as a Baptist minister.
