= Dave Lewis (linebacker) =

American football player (1954–2020)

No. 57, 53, 51
- Position: Linebacker

Personal information
- Born: October 15, 1954; San Diego, California, U.S.
- Died: July 14, 2020 (aged 65); Tampa, Florida, U.S.
- Listed height: 6 ft 4 in (1.93 m)
- Listed weight: 240 lb (109 kg)

Career information
- High school: Lincoln (CA)
- College: USC
- NFL draft: 1977: 2nd round, 29th overall pick

Career history
- Tampa Bay Buccaneers (1977–1981); San Diego Chargers (1982); Los Angeles Rams (1983)

Awards and highlights
- Pro Bowl (1980); National champion (1974); Second-team All-American (1976); First-team All-Pac-8 (1976)

Career NFL statistics
- Sacks: 9
- Interceptions: 10
- Fumble recoveries: 7
- Stats at Pro Football Reference

David Rodney Lewis (October 15, 1954 – July 14, 2020) was an American professional football player who was a linebacker in the National Football League (NFL).

== Early life ==
Prior to that he played at San Diego City College and Abraham Lincoln High School where Marcus Allen, Akili Smith and Terrell Davis have since played.

== College career ==
Lewis played college football at the University of Southern California where he was All-Pac-10 player. After retirement lewis Transitioned into coaching Where He Spent The Majority of his time at Tampa Catholic High School including time as the head coach. Prior to his Death Lewis Suffered a heart attack and Had a pacemaker implanted.

== Professional career ==
Lewis played In the NFL With The Tampa Bay Buccaneers Los Angeles Rams and San Diego Chargers. He played in the 1980 Pro Bowl.
