= Mike Shumann =

American football player (born 1955)

No. 84, 82
- Position: Wide receiver

Personal information
- Born: October 13, 1955 (age 71); Louisville, Kentucky, U.S.

Career information
- College: Florida State
- NFL draft: 1978: undrafted

Career history
- San Francisco 49ers (1978–1979); Tampa Bay Buccaneers (1980); San Francisco 49ers (1981); St. Louis Cardinals (1982–1983); Oakland Invaders

Awards and highlights
- Super Bowl champion (XVI)

Career NFL statistics
- Receptions: 62
- Receiving yards: 760
- Receiving TDs: 5
- Rushing yards: 19
- Games played: 63
- Games started: 17
- Stats at Pro Football Reference

Michael William Shumann (born October 13, 1955) is an American former professional football player and sports reporter. He played as a wide receiver in the National Football League (NFL). After his football career, Shumann was a sports reporter for KGO-TV in San Francisco.

Shumann played college football for the Florida State Seminoles, and was inducted into their hall of fame.

In April 2018, a stadium video recorded Shumann allegedly stealing a sweatshirt belonging to a Golden State Warriors staff member. After explaining that he picked up the sweatshirt to safe guard it and later returned it to the head of security, Shumann resigned from KGO after 24 years.
