= Jeris White =

American football player (born 1952)

No. 41, 45
- Position: Cornerback

Personal information
- Born: September 3, 1952 (age 74); Fort Worth, Texas, U.S.
- Listed height: 5 ft 9 in (1.75 m)
- Listed weight: 188 lb (85 kg)

Career information
- High school: Honolulu (HI) Radford
- College: Hawaii
- NFL draft: 1974: 2nd round, 52nd overall pick

Career history
- Miami Dolphins (1974–1976); Tampa Bay Buccaneers (1977–1979); Washington Redskins (1980–1982)

Awards and highlights
- Super Bowl champion (XVII)

Career NFL statistics
- Games played: 129
- Interceptions: 19
- Fumbles recoveries: 9
- Stats at Pro Football Reference

Jeris Jerome White (born September 3, 1952) is an American former professional football player who was a cornerback for nine seasons in the National Football League (NFL) with the Miami Dolphins, Tampa Bay Buccaneers, and Washington Redskins. He played football at Radford High School, Honolulu, Hawaii, and college football for the Hawaii Rainbow Warriors. He was selected by Miami in the second round of the 1974 NFL draft. He is the first person from a Hawaii high and collegiate school to ever play in a Super Bowl. White was a holdout when the Redskins opened the 1983 season, so Washington replaced him with its first-round draft pick Darrell Green.
