= Darrell Austin =

American football player (born 1951)

No. 67, 69
- Position: Guard/Center/Offensive tackle

Personal information
- Born: November 16, 1951 (age 74); Union, South Carolina, U.S.
- Listed height: 6 ft 4 in (1.93 m)
- Listed weight: 250 lb (113 kg)

Career information
- High school: Union (SC) Co.
- College: South Carolina
- NFL draft: 1974: 16th round, 404th overall pick

Career history
- New York Jets (1975–1978); Tampa Bay Buccaneers (1979–1980)

Career NFL statistics
- Games played: 69
- Games started: 20
- Stats at Pro Football Reference

Kenneth Darrell Austin (born November 16, 1951) is an American former professional football player who was an offensive lineman in the National Football League (NFL). He was drafted by the Denver Broncos in the 16th round (404th overall) in the 1974 NFL draft. He played six seasons for the New York Jets and the Tampa Bay Buccaneers.
