= Mike Rae =

American football player (born 1951)

No. 15
- Position: Quarterback

Personal information
- Born: July 26, 1951 (age 75); Long Beach, California, U.S.
- Listed height: 6 ft 0 in (1.83 m)
- Listed weight: 193 lb (88 kg)

Career information
- High school: Lakewood (Lakewood, California)
- College: USC
- NFL draft: 1973: 8th round, 205th overall pick

Career history
- Toronto Argonauts (1973–1975); Oakland Raiders (1976–1977); Tampa Bay Buccaneers (1978–1979); Washington Redskins (1981); Los Angeles Express (1983)

Awards and highlights
- Super Bowl champion (XI); National champion (1972); Pop Warner Trophy (1972)

Career NFL statistics
- Passing attempts: 249
- Passing completions: 124
- Completion percentage: 49.8%
- TD–INT: 12–14
- Passing yards: 1,536
- Passer rating: 61.9
- Stats at Pro Football Reference

Michael John Rae (born July 26, 1951) is an American former professional football player who was a quarterback in the National Football League (NFL) and Canadian Football League (CFL). He played college football for the USC Trojans.

== Early life ==
Rae attended and played high school football at Lakewood High School.

== College career ==
Rae played college football at the University of Southern California. In 1972 Rae was at the helm as the Trojans went undefeated to a Rose Bowl win en route to the National Championship.

- 1970: 20/45 for 331 yards with 4 TD and 1 INT.
- 1971: 38/79 for 599 yards with 7 TD and 4 INT.
- 1972: 114/199 for 1754 yards with 5 TD and 12 INT. 82 carries for 247 yards and 5 TD.

== Professional career ==
After USC, he was the backup quarterback for the Toronto Argonauts of the Canadian Football League before being not offered a contract after 1975 season. Rae played for the Oakland Raiders, Tampa Bay Buccaneers and Washington Redskins between 1976 and 1981. Rae also shared quarterback duties with former UCLA quarterback Tom Ramsey during the inaugural season of the L.A. Express of the United States Football League (USFL) in 1983.

== Personal life ==
Since 2008, Rae has been the men's golf coach at Saddleback College in Mission Viejo, California.
