= Curtis Jordan =

American football player (born 1954)

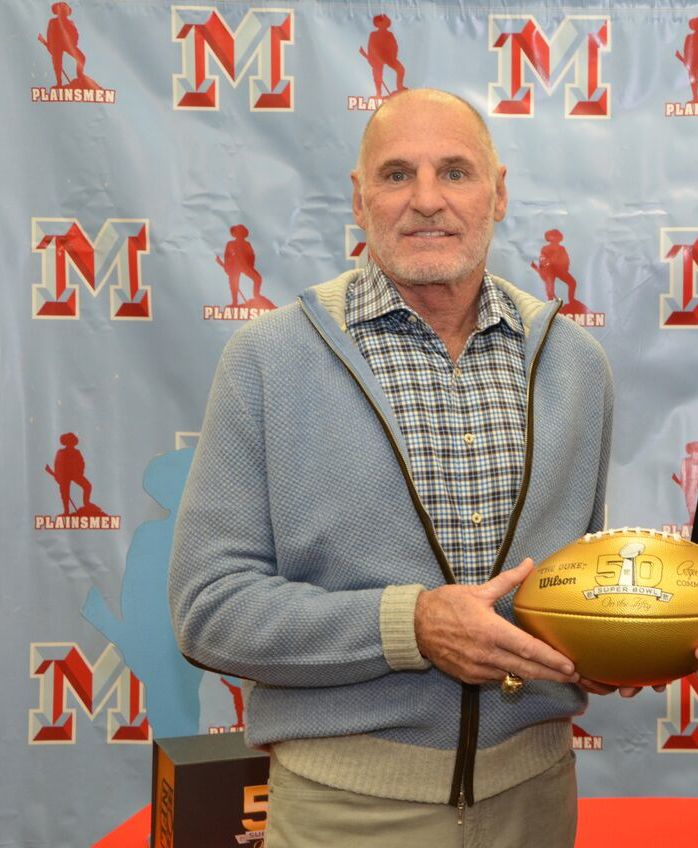
- Jordan being honored by the NFL in receiving a Gold NFL Football as part of the 50th Anniversary of the Super Bowl

No. 25, 22
- Position: Safety

Personal information
- Born: January 25, 1954 (age 72); Lubbock, Texas, U.S.
- Listed height: 6 ft 2 in (1.88 m)
- Listed weight: 200 lb (91 kg)

Career information
- High school: Monterey (Lubbock)
- College: Texas Tech
- NFL draft: 1976: 6th round, 158th overall pick

Career history
- Tampa Bay Buccaneers (1976–1980); Washington Redskins (1981–1986)

Awards and highlights
- Super Bowl champion (XVII); First-team All-SWC (1974); Second-team All-SWC (1975)

Career NFL statistics
- Interceptions: 17
- Fumble recoveries: 9
- Defensive TDs: 1
- Stats at Pro Football Reference

Curtis Wayne Jordan (born January 25, 1954) is an American former professional football player who was a safety in the National Football League (NFL) for the Tampa Bay Buccaneers and Washington Redskins. He played college football for the Texas Tech Red Raiders and was selected in the sixth round of the 1976 NFL draft.

Since retiring from football in 1986, Jordan has been involved in the restaurant business in Lubbock. His interest in restaurants was sparked during the 1982 NFL players strike. Jordan was involved in the operation of several East Coast restaurants before returning to Lubbock, where he owns Cujo's Sportz Bar, 50th Street Caboose, and the Copper Caboose. In July 2009, he opened the first Five Guys Burgers and Fries chain outlet in Lubbock. Within five weeks, the restaurant was ranked No. 2 in Texas for sales.
