= Greg Roberts (American football) =

American football player (born 1956)

No. 61
- Position: Guard

Personal information
- Born: November 29, 1956 (age 69); Nacogdoches, Texas, U.S.
- Listed height: 6 ft 3 in (1.91 m)
- Listed weight: 260 lb (118 kg)

Career information
- High school: Nacogdoches
- College: Oklahoma
- NFL draft: 1979: 2nd round, 33rd overall pick

Career history
- Tampa Bay Buccaneers (1979–1982); Memphis Showboats (1984)

Awards and highlights
- PFWA All-Rookie Team (1979); Outland Trophy (1978); UPI Lineman of the Year (1978); Unanimous All-American (1978); Third-team All-American (1977); 2× First-team All-Big Eight (1977, 1978)

Career NFL statistics
- Games played: 45
- Games started: 42
- Fumble recoveries: 3
- Stats at Pro Football Reference

Gregory Lafayette Roberts (born November 29, 1956) is an American former professional football player who was a guard for five seasons in the National Football League (NFL) and United States Football League (USFL) during the late 1970s and 1980s. He played college football for the Oklahoma Sooners, earning unanimous All-American honors in 1978. Roberts was selected in the second round of the 1979 NFL draft, and played professionally for the NFL's Tampa Bay Buccaneers and USFL's Memphis Showboats.

Roberts was born in Nacogdoches, Texas.

He attended the University of Oklahoma, where he played for coach Barry Switzer's Sooners teams from 1975 to 1978. As a senior in 1978, he was recognized as a consensus first-team All-American and won the Outland Trophy as the best interior lineman in the country.
