= David Logan (American football) =

American football player (1956–1999)

No. 76, 94
- Position: Defensive tackle

Personal information
- Born: October 25, 1956; Pittsburgh, Pennsylvania, U.S.
- Died: January 12, 1999 (aged 42); Tampa, Florida, U.S.
- Listed height: 6 ft 2 in (1.88 m)
- Listed weight: 250 lb (113 kg)

Career information
- High school: Peabody (Pittsburgh)
- College: Pittsburgh
- NFL draft: 1979: 12th round, 307th overall pick

Career history
- Tampa Bay Buccaneers (1979–1986); Green Bay Packers (1987)

Awards and highlights
- First-team All-Pro (1984); National champion (1976); Second-team All-East (1978)

Career NFL statistics
- Sacks: 38.8
- Interceptions: 1
- Touchdowns: 3
- Stats at Pro Football Reference

David Logan (October 25, 1956 – January 12, 1999) was an American professional football player who was a defensive tackle in the National Football League (NFL). He was selected by the Tampa Bay Buccaneers in the 12th round of the 1979 NFL draft. He played college football for the Pittsburgh Panthers. A nose tackle with the Buccaneers from 1979 to 1986, Logan finished his career ranked second on the team's all-time sack list and sixth in career tackles. He was named an All-Pro in 1984 and finished his NFL playing career with the Green Bay Packers in 1987.

== Sports broadcasting career ==
Logan pursued a sports broadcasting career as a color-analyst on Tampa Bay radio broadcasts for eight years, working beside play-by-play announcer Gene Deckerhoff locally on WQYK-AM 1010 and FM 99.5. Logan was the original anchor of "Sports Connection" on Bright House Networks' Bay News 9 cable channel in Tampa.

== Death and legacy ==
Logan died from a heart attack at age 42 on January 13, 1999; an autopsy revealed several blood clots on his left leg that had spread to his lungs and which resulted in respiratory failure.

=== Legacy ===
The Dave Logan Scholarship Fund was established by the Bright House Sports Network in January 1999. The fund annually awards scholarships to four high school seniors in both the Tampa and Central Florida areas who excel in both academics and athletics.
