= Isaac Hagins =

American football player (born 1954)

No. 1, 81
- Position: Wide receiver

Personal information
- Born: March 2, 1954 (age 72); Shreveport, Louisiana, U.S.
- Listed height: 5 ft 9 in (1.75 m)
- Listed weight: 179 lb (81 kg)

Career information
- High school: C. E. Byrd (Shreveport)
- College: Southern
- NFL draft: 1976: 9th round, 262nd overall pick

Career history
- Minnesota Vikings (1976)*; Tampa Bay Buccaneers (1976–1980)
- * Offseason or practice squad member only

Career NFL statistics
- Games played: 50
- Receptions: 83
- Receiving yards: 1,317
- Touchdowns: 5
- Stats at Pro Football Reference

Isaac Ben Hagins (born March 2, 1954) is an American former professional football player who was a wide receiver in the National Football League (NFL). He was selected by the Minnesota Vikings in the ninth round of the 1976 NFL draft. He played college football at Southern.

Hagins also played for the Tampa Bay Buccaneers.
