= Larry Mucker =

American football player (born 1954)

No. 87
- Position: Wide receiver

Personal information
- Born: December 15, 1954 (age 71); Fresno, California, U.S.
- Listed height: 5 ft 11 in (1.80 m)
- Listed weight: 190 lb (86 kg)

Career information
- High school: McLane (Fresno)
- College: Arizona State
- NFL draft: 1977: 9th round, 251st overall pick

Career history
- Tampa Bay Buccaneers (1977–1980)

Career NFL statistics
- Receptions: 33
- Receiving yards: 635
- Touchdowns: 5
- Stats at Pro Football Reference

Larry Donnell Mucker (born December 15, 1954) is an American former professional football player who was a wide receiver in the National Football League (NFL). He played college football for the Arizona State Sun Devils and was selected by the Tampa Bay Buccaneers in the ninth round of the 1977 NFL draft.
