= 1987 Tampa Bay Buccaneers season =

NFL team season

- Owner: Hugh Culverhouse
- Head coach: Ray Perkins
- Home stadium: Tampa Stadium

Results
- Record: 4–11
- Division place: 4th NFC Central
- Playoffs: Did not qualify
- Pro Bowlers: None
- Team MVP: QB Steve DeBerg

The 1987 Tampa Bay Buccaneers season was the franchise's 12th season in the National Football League, the 12th playing their home games at Tampa Stadium, and the first under head coach Ray Perkins. It was a year of great change for the Buccaneers. Perkins had only needed three seasons (1979–1981) to build the New York Giants into a playoff team, and it was hoped that he would be able to repeat the feat with the Buccaneers. They improved over their 2–14 record from 1986 and finished 4–11.

The Buccaneers possessed the first overall pick in the NFL draft, and used it to select University of Miami quarterback Vinny Testaverde. The Buccaneers appeared changed and won four games early in the season, but they notably lost large leads in later games and fell from playoff contention after midseason. The season was marked by a 1987 players' strike in which one week's games were canceled and regular play was interrupted for a month, while NFL owners fielded teams of replacement players.

== Overview ==
Perkins brought discipline to a team that had been described as "the country club of the NFL", and rebuilt the team with youth. Perkins claimed that the Buccaneers were more talented than the New York Giants team he had taken over in 1979, and selected a then-record 20 players in the 1987 NFL draft. He improved their conditioning program, and instituted three-a-day practices. Perkins's harsh style was in stark contrast to the laid-back approach of his predecessor Leeman Bennett, of whom it was said that his "idea of team discipline was everyone wearing the same color uniform on game day". Conditioning improvements included emphasizing free weights over Nautilus machines, to improve explosiveness. Players were also given pay incentives to work out, although Perkins expressed surprise that players should need extra incentive to improve their conditioning. The improved conditioning paid off early in the season: their opening-week 48–10 win over the Atlanta Falcons ranked as the most Buccaneer points scored in a game, matched only in Super Bowl XXXVII 15 years later, until 2019, when the Buccaneers won 55–40 over the Los Angeles Rams. The team had a 1–1 record when the season was disrupted by the 1987 players' strike. Unlike in previous seasons, when players' strikes stopped all play, the owners formed teams of replacement players to play the scheduled games. The Buccaneers had a 3–2 record when regular play resumed, and nearly beat a Chicago Bears team only one season removed from its Super Bowl victory. The game had been preceded by much media speculation over whether Bears star quarterback Jim McMahon would play. It was the first week that McMahon was in the Bears' lineup since undergoing surgery after being dropped on his shoulder following a play the previous November, although Mike Tomczak remained the Bears' starter for the game. The Buccaneers took a 20–0 lead and dominated the game for three quarters. Late in the third quarter, McMahon came off the bench and sparked the Bears to a 27–26 win, their biggest comeback in team history. Two weeks later, Tampa Bay had a 28–3 fourth-quarter lead over the St. Louis Cardinals. In what was at the time the second-biggest comeback in NFL history, the Cardinals scored 4 touchdowns to win the game. The Buccaneers did not win again for the rest of the season. It was rare for an NFL team to fall into a season-long losing streak following such a defensive collapse. Once the Buccaneers were out of the playoff picture, Perkins began to prepare Testaverde for the next season. Testaverde's first start came on December 6 against the New Orleans Saints. His 369 yards on 22 completions set a record for an NFL debut, but his two early fumbles set up a Saints lead that the Buccaneers were not able to overcome. Tackle Ron Heller, dispirited by Coach Perkins's confrontational attitude and three-a-day practices that he believed were causing unnecessary injuries to the players, got into a fight with Perkins at halftime of this game that led to his being traded to the Seattle Seahawks. In return, the Buccaneers received defensive lineman Randy Edwards and a 1989 6th-round draft pick that was used to select linebacker Derrick Little. Neither made the Buccaneers' squad. Heller went on to play seven more solid seasons. The Buccaneers finished the season with a 4–11 record. Their 3–4 division record placed them ahead of the 4–11 Detroit Lions for fourth place in the NFC Central. Ron Holmes had eight quarterback sacks despite appearing in only ten games. Ervin Randle, who was named a UPI Second Team All-NFC linebacker, was the only Buccaneer to be singled out for postseason honors.

== Offseason ==
=== The hiring of Ray Perkins ===
Ray Perkins replaced Leeman Bennett as the third head coach in Buccaneers history. Expectations had been that owner Hugh Culverhouse would hire popular ex-Tampa Bay Bandits coach Steve Spurrier, but Perkins was the only candidate interviewed. Perkins had been approached about the job two years earlier, but was not interested at the time. He was given the same title (Head Coach and Vice-President of Football Operations) as the previous two coaches. He brought along seven of his Alabama assistants: linebackers coach Sylvester Croom, assistant coach John Bobo, running backs coach Rodney Stokes, defensive line coach Mike DuBose, strength coach Kent Johnston, head trainer Chris Smith, and defensive coordinator Joe Kines, who had previously been Charley Pell's defensive coordinator with the Florida Gators. He rounded out his staff with Kansas City Chiefs secondary coach Doug Graber and receivers coach Richard Williamson, Buffalo Bills defensive coordinator Herb Paterra, SMU defensive coordinator Bill Clay, and Atlanta Falcons offensive line coach Larry Beightol. Perkins also overhauled the scouting staff, firing most of them (including Jim Gruden, father of future Buccaneers coach Jon Gruden) shortly after the draft. No reason was given, but some observers, most outspokenly Boston Globe columnist Will McDonough, felt that the Buccaneers' office was staffed heavily with people whose main experience was in college football, and that the team suffered from a lack of NFL knowledge. Recently fired Falcons coach Dan Henning turned down the offensive coordinator position, as he had been trying to rebuild the Falcons and did not want to relive that experience with another team. Perkins had previously been hired as head coach of the New York Giants on the basis of his experience working with a losing franchise (the New England Patriots) that needed turning around. Perkins coached the Giants back to the playoffs, leaving four years later to succeed coaching legend Bear Bryant at the University of Alabama. Ironically, irritation over the 1982 players' strike was a major factor in Perkins leaving the Giants, and became an issue he had to contend with again in 1987. Frustration with what he saw as overregulation by the NCAA played a part in Perkins's decision to return to the NFL. Along with $750,000 a year for five years, Perkins was given free rein to run the Buccaneers however he wanted. Some players were enthusiastic about the Perkins hire. "Coach Perkins will bring in a sense of pride here, and that's something we've been missing", said tackle Ron Heller. Others were upset with Perkins's military-style manner, saying that he "made playing football a miserable experience".

Perkins forced the Buccaneers to suffer in the broiling Florida sun by switching the home bench at Tampa Stadium from the west sideline to the east, opposite the press box. This was done to mimic Alabama, which occupied the sideline opposite the press box since Bear Bryant began coaching at his alma mater, and continued it when Perkins succeeded his mentor (also, the Giants, the team Perkins coached from 1979-82, have always occupied the sideline opposite the press box since moving to New Jersey in 1976). Perkins moved the Bucs back to the west side in 1990 (Alabama started occupying the west (press box) sideline at Bryant-Denny Stadium when Nick Saban became Crimson Tide coach in 2007).

=== NFL draft ===
Pick	Round	Player	Position	School
1	1	Vinny Testaverde	Quarterback	Miami (FL)
36	2 (Note: from Buffalo)	Ricky Reynolds	Cornerback	Washington State
50	2 (Note: from San Francisco)	Winston Moss	Linebacker	Miami (FL)
51	2 (Note: from New England)	Don Smith	Running back	Mississippi State
57	3	Mark Carrier	Wide receiver	Nicholls State
58	Supplemental	Dan Sileo	Defensive tackle	Miami (FL)
85	4	Don Graham	Linebacker	Penn State
87	4	Ron Hall	Tight end	Hawaii
106	4	Bruce Hill	Wide receiver	Arizona State
135	5	Henry Rolling	Linebacker	Nevada
137	5 (Note: from Washington)	Tony Mayes	Defensive back	Kentucky
146	6 (Note: from San Diego)	Steve Bartalo	Running back	Colorado State
169	7	Curt Jarvis	Defensive tackle	Alabama
190	7	Harry Swayne	Tackle	Rutgers
197	8 (Note: from Indianapolis)	Stan Mataele	Defensive tackle	Arizona
224	9	Joe Armentrout	Running back	Wisconsin
246	9	Greg Davis	Kicker	Citadel
252	10	Mike Simmonds	Guard	Indiana State
280	11	Reggie Taylor	Running back	Cincinnati
308	12	Scott Cooper	Defensive tackle	Kearney State
313	12 (Note: from St. Louis)	Mike Shula	Quarterback	Alabama

= Pro Bowler	= Hall of Famer

==== Draft trades ====
The Buccaneers received a 2nd- and a 4th-round draft pick from the San Francisco 49ers in exchange for quarterback Steve Young, and a 2nd-round pick from the New England Patriots in exchange for guard Sean Farrell. They swapped 2nd-round picks with the Buffalo Bills, and also received a 4th-round pick in return. The Buccaneers' original 5th-round pick had been traded to the Patriots for a 6th-round pick the previous year. They received a 5th-round pick from New England in exchange for a 4th-round pick the following year, and a 5th-round pick from the Washington Redskins in exchange for the rights to quarterback Doug Williams. The Buccaneers' original 6th-round pick was traded to the Pittsburgh Steelers in exchange for center Dan Turk, but they received a 6th-round pick from the San Diego Chargers as part of an earlier deal for linebacker Andy Hawkins. The original 8th-round pick was traded to the New York Jets in exchange for tackle Marvin Powell. Cornerback John Holt had been traded to the Indianapolis Colts in 1986 for the Colts' 1987 8th-round pick. Linebacker Rick DiBernardo was traded to the St. Louis Cardinals for a 12th-round pick. Dan Sileo was signed as a free agent after the NCAA ruled that he had used up his college eligibility, but the league voided the agreement and declared that he must enter a draft. A special draft was held in which the Buccaneers selected him with a 1988 third-round pick.

=== Vinny Testaverde ===
Using their number one selection in the 1987 draft, the Buccaneers selected quarterback Vinny Testaverde, who had led the Miami Hurricanes to a 21–3 record in games he started. Looking to avoid a repeat of the previous year's disastrous selection of Bo Jackson, the Buccaneers signed Testaverde 16 days before the draft began. Owner Hugh Culverhouse wanted to take one last shot at building the Buccaneers into a successful franchise, and made sure that money would not be an issue in signing Testaverde. In training camp, Testaverde failed to win the starting job over veteran Steve DeBerg, who coach Perkins felt gave the team a better chance to win. But DeBerg was eventually displaced for the fourth time, having played for the San Francisco 49ers when Joe Montana was drafted, the Denver Broncos when John Elway was traded for, and the Buccaneers when Steve Young was signed.

=== Steve Young ===
When the Buccaneers selected University of Miami quarterback Vinny Testaverde first overall in the 1987 NFL draft, starting quarterback Steve Young became expendable. He was traded to the 49ers on April 24, 1987. The 49ers were concerned about the health of Joe Montana, and were preparing for the possibility that he might not recover from back surgery. The Buccaneers received 2nd and 4th round draft picks in the trade, picks 50 and 106 overall, which they used to draft University of Miami linebacker Winston Moss and Arizona State wide receiver Bruce Hill. They also received an unspecified amount of cash in the deal. Young would spend the final 13 years of his career with the 49ers, a stint which would help him secure a spot in the Pro Football Hall of Fame in 2005.

=== Other attempted deals ===
Coach Perkins met for several hours with Oklahoma linebacker Brian Bosworth, who entered a supplemental draft after being kicked off of the Oklahoma team. Perkins and Bosworth were impressed with each other, but the rights to select were awarded lottery-style, and the first selection went to the Seattle Seahawks. The Seahawks drafted Bosworth despite his having sent them a letter telling them not to bother. He expressed a preference to play for the Buccaneers. When the Indianapolis Colts failed to sign linebacker Cornelius Bennett, the second player selected in the draft (directly after Testaverde), they attempted to trade him to Tampa Bay. Perkins had previously coached Bennett at Alabama, but the Colts, looking for extra draft picks to trade to the Los Angeles Rams to get running back Eric Dickerson, wanted two draft picks in return for Bennett. Perkins felt that this price was too steep. Perkins also attempted to persuade Bo Jackson, their first-overall pick from the 1986 NFL draft who had refused to sign with the Buccaneers, to change his mind and join the team. Coach Perkins would make a move in the supplemental draft by taking All-American defensive tackle Dan Sileo out of the University of Miami (FL) with a 3rd round pick, after the NCAA ruled he had used up his eligibility.

== Roster ==
=== Final roster ===
1987 Tampa Bay Buccaneers roster
Quarterbacks (QB): 17 Steve DeBerg; 7 Rick Neuheisel; 11 Mike Shula; 14 Vinny Testaverde; Running backs (RB): 42 Steve Bartalo; 38 James Evans; 25 Bobby Howard; 37 Eddie Hunter; 35 Jeff Smith; 32 James Wilder; Wide receivers (WR): 89 Mark Carrier; 87 Gerald Carter; 84 Bruce Hill; 83 Solomon Miller; 85 Gene Taylor; Tight ends (TE): 82 Ron Hall; 86 Calvin Magee	Offensive linemen (OL): 71 Mark Cooper T; 79 Conrad Goode G; 60 Randy Grimes C; 73 Ron Heller T; 77 J. D. Maarleveld T; 68 Rick Mallory G; 50 Dan Turk G/C; 66 George Yarno G; Defensive linemen (DL): 78 John Cannon DE; 90 Ron Holmes DE; 95 Curt Jarvis NT; 99 Tom McHale DE; 93 Dan Sileo NT; 94 Mike Stensrud NT; 70 Harry Swayne DE	Linebackers (LB): 52 Scot Brantley ILB; 58 Jeff Davis ILB; 91 Brian Grant ILB; 57 Winston Moss OLB; 59 Kevin Murphy OLB; 54 Ervin Randle ILB; 56 Jackie Walker OLB; 51 Chris Washington OLB; Defensive backs (DB): 23 Don Anderson CB; 36 Bobby Futrell CB; 31 Sonny Gordon SS; 28 Ray Isom FS; 22 Rod Jones CB; 33 Bobby Kemp SS; 29 Ricky Reynolds CB; 24 Paul Tripoli FS; Special teams (ST): 5 Frank Garcia P; 1 Donald Igwebuike K	Reserve: 39 Cliff Austin RB (IR); -- Bobby Bankston WR (IR); 26 Ricky Easmon CB (IR); 81 Phil Freeman WR (IR); 53 Don Graham LB (IR); 75 Kevin Kellin DE (IR); 74 Marvin Powell T (IR); 55 Henry Rolling LB (IR); 62 Mike Simmonds G (IR); 47 Don Smith RB (IR); 72 Rob Taylor T (IR); 64 Kevin Thomas C (IR); 27 Kevin Walker CB (IR); -- Quentin Walker RB (IR); -- Herkie Walls WR (IR); -- Keith Williams RB (IR); 34 Adrian Wright RB (IR); Rookies in italics

=== Replacement roster ===
The following team was assembled during the NFLPA strike:

1987 Tampa Bay Buccaneers replacement roster
Quarterbacks: 7 John Reaves; 10 Jim Zorn; 11 Mike Hold; Running backs: 39 Greg Boone; 32 Charles Gladman; 25 Paul Miles; 24 Dan Land; 47 Harold Ricks; 42 Dave Ciszewski; 36 Derrick Thomas; 20 Craig Turner; 34 Adrian Wright; Wide receivers: 87 Steve Carter; 85 Ron Jenkins; 89 Eric Streater; 88 Dwayne Dixon; 84 David Jackson; 83 Herkie Walls; Tight ends: 80 Steve Holloway; 82 Jeff Modesitt	Offensive linemen: 55 John Hunt; 62 David Jordan; 74 Don Thompson; 66 Dave Heffernan; 69 Brian Martinek; 50 Chuck Pitcock; 77 Rufus Brown; 60 Paul O'Connor; 79 Mitch Geier; 64 Don Pumphrey; 73 David Johnson; 68 Reggie Smith; Defensive linemen: 90 Mike Clark; 98 James Ramey; 94 Charles Riggins; 75 Don Bramlett; 76 Fred Nordgren; 78 Walter Carter; 67 Roy Harris; 70 Calvin Turner	Linebackers: 56 Sankar Montoute; 52 Pat Teague; 53 Fred McCallister; 57 Jay Wittenborn; 54 Brian Gant; 59 Leon Pennington; 51 Miles Turpin; Defensive backs: 29 Lee Paige; 27 Kevin Walker; 31 Ivory Curry; 22 Torin Clark; 33 Jeff George; 21 Marcus Quinn; 28 Carey Reid; 23 Tim King; 26 Paul Tripoli; Special teams: 1 Van Tiffin K; 3 John Carney K; 5 Ray Criswell P

== Coaching staff ==
1987 Tampa Bay Buccaneers staff
Front office: Owner and president – Hugh Culverhouse; Assistant to the president – Phil Krueger; Director of player personnel – Jerry Angelo; Director of pro personnel – Erik Widmark; Head coaches: Vice president/head coach – Ray Perkins; Offensive coaches: Quarterbacks – Marc Trestman; Running backs – Sylvester Croom; Receivers – Richard Williamson; Offensive line – Larry Beightol; Offensive assistant – John Bobo	Defensive coaches: Defensive coordinator/secondary – Doug Graber; Defensive line – Mike DuBose; Outside linebackers – Joe Kines; Inside linebackers – Herb Paterra; Defensive assistant – Bill Clay; Special teams coaches: Special teams coordinator – Rodney Stokes; Strength and conditioning: Strength and conditioning – Kent Johnston

== Regular season ==
=== 1987 players' strike ===
The NFL players went on strike during the third week of the 1987 season. Unlike in the 1982 season, in which play was suspended for the duration of the strike, the NFL continued to play a full schedule. Games were cancelled in the third week, but returned in the fourth with rosters of replacement players. These "scab" players were in some cases regular players who crossed the picket line, but were usually players who had previously failed to make an NFL team.

The Buccaneers' replacement team was made up of a dozen of their training camp cuts, a dozen more players cut from other teams' training camps, and 17 former players from the USFL's Tampa Bay Bandits. The only regular Buccaneer to cross the picket line was center Dan Turk, although three inactive players crossed the picket line by receiving treatment for their injuries. There were a few notable names on the replacement roster. Former Bandits quarterback and Florida Gators standout John Reaves started the first two games, while former Seattle Seahawks and Winnipeg Blue Bombers quarterback Jim Zorn returned to the NFL to start for the Buccaneers in the final replacement game. Former Oklahoma and USFL standout Marcus Dupree tried out for the replacement squad, but was rejected due to health concerns.

The replacement players finished with a 2–1 record. Several of them, notably Zorn and kicker John Carney, went on to have successful careers as players and coaches. Three replacement Buccaneers, Brian Gant, Steve Holloway, and Paul Tripoli, remained with the team once regular play resumed. Figures later published in the Los Angeles Times showed that the strike cost owners more than $108 million in potential income. All teams had less income in 1987 than in 1986, and the Buccaneers lost money, although they were the closest to profitability of the 21 teams who played the season for a loss.

=== Schedule ===
**Regular season**
Week	Date	Opponent	Result	Record	Game site	Attendance
1	September 13	Atlanta Falcons	**W** 48–10	1–0	Tampa Stadium	51,250
2	September 20	at **Chicago Bears**	**L** 20–3	1–1	Soldier Field	63,551
3	September 27	Green Bay Packers	Canceled (Note: All week 3 games were cancelled due to the players' strike.)			
4 (Note: Weeks 4, 5, and 6, shown in italics, were played by replacement players.)	October 4	at **Detroit Lions**	**W** 31–27	2–1	Pontiac Silverdome	4,919
5	October 11	San Diego Chargers	**L** 17–13	2–2	Tampa Stadium	23,873
6	October 18	**Minnesota Vikings**	**W** 20–10	3–2	Tampa Stadium	20,850
7	October 25	**Chicago Bears**	**L** 27–26	3–3	Tampa Stadium	70,747
8	November 1	at **Green Bay Packers**	**W** 23–17	4–3	Milwaukee County Stadium	50,348
9	November 8	at St. Louis Cardinals	**L** 31–28	4–4	Busch Memorial Stadium	22,449
10	November 15	at **Minnesota Vikings**	**L** 23–17	4–5	Hubert H. Humphrey Metrodome	48,605
11	November 22	San Francisco 49ers	**L** 24–10	4–6	Tampa Stadium	63,211
12	November 29	at Los Angeles Rams	**L** 35–3	4–7	Anaheim Stadium	45,188
13	December 6	at New Orleans Saints	**L** 44–34	4–8	Louisiana Superdome	66,471
14	December 13	**Detroit Lions**	**L** 20–10	4–9	Tampa Stadium	41,699
15	December 20	St. Louis Cardinals	**L** 31–14	4–10	Tampa Stadium	32,046
16	December 27	at Indianapolis Colts	**L** 24–6	4–11	Hoosierdome	60,468
Note: Division opponents in **bold** text

=== Standings ===
NFC Central
	W	L	T	PCT	DIV	CONF	PF	PA	STK
Chicago Bears^{(2)}	11	4	0	.733	7–0	9–2	356	282	W1
Minnesota Vikings^{(5)}	8	7	0	.533	3–5	6–6	336	335	L1
Green Bay Packers	5	9	1	.367	3–4	4–7	255	300	L2
Tampa Bay Buccaneers	4	11	0	.267	3–4	4–9	286	360	L8
Detroit Lions	4	11	0	.267	2–5	4–7	269	384	W1

== Game summaries ==
=== Week 1: vs Atlanta Falcons ===
	1	2	3	4	Total
Falcons	0	3	0	7	10
Buccaneers	14	13	7	14	48

at Tampa Stadium, Tampa, Florida
The Buccaneers opened the Ray Perkins era by setting team records for points scored, total yardage, margin of victory, and touchdown passes thrown. Steve DeBerg was 24 of 34 for 333 yards and five touchdowns, throwing touchdowns on each of the Buccaneers' first four possessions. DeBerg's five touchdown passes still stands as a Buccaneers record, having been tied by Brad Johnson in 2002. Perkins, who had played with Joe Namath in college and Johnny Unitas in the pros, and drafted Phil Simms with the Giants, said that DeBerg had one of the best games of any quarterback with whom he had been associated. In a completely dominating performance, the Buccaneers controlled the ball for 38 minutes, allowed no sacks, and converted 14 of 16 third-down attempts. Meanwhile, the Buccaneers defense had four sacks and three turnovers. DeBerg did throw one interception, but on the very next play cornerback Bobby Futrell intercepted David Archer's overthrow of tight end Ken Whisenhunt.

=== Week 2: at Chicago Bears ===
	1	2	3	4	Total
Buccaneers	0	3	0	0	3
Bears	7	7	0	6	20

at Soldier Field, Chicago
The Buccaneers forced four turnovers and held Bears running back Walter Payton to 24 yards on 15 carries, but the offense, which also committed four turnovers, was ineffective. One of Payton's runs was a 1-yard touchdown that broke Jim Brown's all-time record of 106 touchdowns. Payton also caught a 9-yard touchdown pass that clinched the game with 3:20 remaining. The Buccaneers had only a field goal to show for four possessions inside the Bears' 30-yard line. Vinny Testaverde made his NFL debut after Steve DeBerg left the game in the fourth quarter with a sprained medial collateral ligament.

=== Week 3: vs Green Bay Packers, cancelled ===
The players went out on strike in week 3. The main demand was free agency for all players with at least four years of service. The weekend's games were cancelled as the owners prepared teams of replacement players. According to owner Hugh Culverhouse, it would not be feasible to make up the cancelled games, with the TV networks already having their schedules set for the open weekend following the season.

=== Week 4: at Detroit Lions ===
	1	2	3	4	Total
Buccaneers	0	21	10	0	31
Lions	17	7	0	3	27

at Pontiac Silverdome, Pontiac, Michigan

Despite advance sales of 40,000 tickets, only 4,919 fans showed up to the first strike game played by replacement players. Neither team had any of its regular players on the roster. Detroit punter Mike Black's 3rd-quarter fumble on the 3-yard line set up Harold Ricks's game-winning touchdown run. The Buccaneers' three second-quarter touchdowns overcame the Lions' early 17-point lead. 17 of the Buccaneers' points resulted from Lions turnovers. Around 1,000 union members, including UAW president Owen Bieber, joined the Lions on the picket lines. Attendance was also likely influenced by a baseball game taking place the same day, in which the Detroit Tigers defeated the Toronto Blue Jays to win the A.L. East Championship.

=== Week 5: vs San Diego Chargers ===
	1	2	3	4	Total
Chargers	0	0	10	7	17
Buccaneers	7	3	0	3	13

at Tampa Stadium, Tampa, Florida

Rick Neuheisel came off the bench to lead the Chargers to three second-half scores. Partly based on this performance, the Buccaneers later signed Neuheisel as a backup quarterback. Although many veteran NFL players crossed the picket line during the week, the Buccaneers were one of only six teams to have no players cross. More than 1,000 area union members joined the Buccaneers regulars in picketing the game, with some fans tearing up their tickets and joining them.

=== Week 6: vs Minnesota Vikings ===
	1	2	3	4	Total
Vikings	3	0	7	0	10
Buccaneers	3	0	14	3	20

at Tampa Stadium, Tampa, Florida
The final replacement game featured a Vikings team with none of its regular players, facing a Buccaneers team with only center Dan Turk crossing the picket line. Tampa Bay took a 17–10 lead in the third quarter, after Kevin Walker's 30-yard interception return and Arthur Wells's end-zone fumble recovery. The Buccaneers' offensive output was limited to two field goals. Jim Zorn had been signed to replace the struggling John Reaves. Zorn also struggled, committing three early turnovers, but got his bearings and wound up 20–of-36 for 199 yards. The week was marked by sluggish work during practices. The players, some of whom were facing pressure to return to their regular jobs, were uncertain over whether they would have a game to play in by the time Sunday arrived.

=== Week 7: vs Chicago Bears ===
	1	2	3	4	Total
Bears	0	14	0	13	27
Buccaneers	20	3	3	0	26

at Tampa Stadium, Tampa, Florida
Chicago Bears quarterback Jim McMahon, on the active roster for the first time in the season, came off the bench in the third quarter to rally the Bears past the Buccaneers. He scored a touchdown on a quarterback sneak with six minutes to go, and tied the game with a touchdown pass to Neal Anderson with 1:28 to go. The Buccaneers allowed seven sacks, but led for most of the game. The Bears were aided by the Buccaneers' poor clock management and their reliance on a conservative offense in the fourth quarter. Perkins denied accusations that they went to a prevent defense and a three-man rush, but admitted that they played too conservatively on defense at the end. Steve DeBerg threw touchdown passes to Calvin Magee and Jeff Smith on the Buccaneers' first two possessions. On the Bears' next possession, Ron Holmes's hit on Mike Tomczak forced a fumble that was recovered in the end zone by Winston Moss to give the Buccaneers a 20–0 lead. The Bears scored two quick touchdowns in the second quarter, but the Buccaneers extended their lead with two Donald Igwebuike field goals. With the Bears struggling on offense, McMahon was inserted into the game. McMahon was 12 of 14 for 144 yards and led the Bears to 156 yards of offense in the last two drives, compared with 142 in the first 50 minutes of the game. A win would have tied the Buccaneers with the Bears for first place in the NFC Central.

=== Week 8: at Green Bay Packers ===
	1	2	3	4	Total
Buccaneers	0	3	17	3	23
Packers	0	0	3	14	17

at Lambeau Field, Green Bay, Wisconsin
Steve DeBerg opened the second half with an 84-yard drive ending in a touchdown, and followed that with a touchdown pass to Gerald Carter a minute later. The game nearly became a repeat of the previous week, as the Packers replaced quarterback Don Majkowski with Randy Wright. Wright's two fourth-quarter touchdowns cut into Tampa Bay's 23–3 lead, but this time the offense was able to hold on to the ball. Two Calvin Magee catches for first downs sealed the victory. The Buccaneers' 17 second-half points we

re credited to the coaching staff's adjustment to the Packers' man-to-man defense. The Buccaneers and Packers both had the same amount of net yards (279), passing yards (190), and rushing yards (89). Donald Igwebuike's three field goals broke Bill Capece's Buccaneer career record. The victory left the Buccaneers in second place in the NFC Central division. This led to speculation as to whether coach Perkins, who had been able to lead the New York Giants to the playoffs in three years as their coach, would be able to repeat the feat in a single year with Tampa Bay.

=== Week 9: at St. Louis Cardinals ===
	1	2	3	4	Total
Buccaneers	7	7	14	0	28
Cardinals	0	3	0	28	31

at Busch Memorial Stadium, St. Louis, Missouri

With the Cardinals down by 25 points in the fourth quarter, quarterback Neil Lomax threw for three touchdowns in a come-from-behind win. One of the touchdowns was to tight end Robert Awalt, the other two to league reception leader J.T. Smith. Donald Igwebuike's potential game-tying 53-yard field goal attempt bounced off the crossbar as time ran out. The Cardinals came in on a three-game losing streak, while the Buccaneers entered the game leading the league in takeaways. The attendance of 22,449 was the Cardinals' lowest in four years, the team having announced the previous week their plans to move to another city. Detectives were assigned to guard Cardinals owner Bill Bidwill due to death threats. Irritation over DeBerg's celebrations after his three touchdown passes provided inspiration to some of the Cardinals, who commented, "He's going to lose his job to Vinny Testaverde in a couple of weeks anyway." Awalt caught nine passes for 124 yards, while Smith caught eight passes for 96 yards. Said coach Perkins of his team's performance, "...they whipped us in every phase of the game. Even down 28–3, they were playing better football than we were." After the Buccaneers turned three consecutive potential blowout wins into nail-biters, safety Rick Woods said that the team seemed to be playing not to lose instead of playing to win. As an example, he noted that many players turned to see how much time was left on the clock after Cardinals linebacker Niko Noga returned a James Wilder Sr. fumble for a touchdown. The next week, Woods was demoted to the taxi squad. Offensive tackle Rob Taylor suffered a strained medial collateral ligament, and center Randy Grimes was also out for the fourth quarter with a hyperextended knee. "We should have gotten a lot more hurt", Perkins said, and accused his players of allowing positive press coverage to inflate their egos and cloud their judgments. The 25-point lead, if it had held, would have represented the largest margin of victory in a Buccaneers' road win. Instead, it became the largest fourth-quarter comeback in NFL history.

=== Week 10: at Minnesota Vikings ===
	1	2	3	4	Total
Buccaneers	0	7	3	7	17
Vikings	0	6	10	7	23

at Hubert H. Humphrey Metrodome, Minneapolis, Minnesota
The Rob Taylor injury from the previous week became a factor as Steve DeBerg was sacked four times, two resulting in fumbles. Perkins expressed dissatisfaction with Taylor's replacements, saying "I'm looking for a left tackle." Both fumbles were caused by Chris Doleman and recovered by Keith Millard, and both led to scores, including Tommy Kramer's first touchdown pass since the previous Dec. 14. Several players were injured, including Vikings first-round draft pick D.J. Dozier. The Buccaneers threw forty-one times, while rushing for a team-low nine attempts. They still had a chance at victory, until Minnesota cornerback Wymon Henderson intercepted a DeBerg pass. He returned the interception 17 yards before fumbling, but the officials ruled him to have been down before the fumble occurred. The instant replay official overturned their call, but the field officials said that they could not return the ball to Tampa because the play had already been whistled dead. This outraged Buccaneer players, who claimed that no whistle had been blown. The Vikings proceeded to run out the clock. The Buccaneers had entered the game with the lead spot in the wild-card playoff race.

=== Week 11: vs San Francisco 49ers ===
	1	2	3	4	Total
49ers	7	10	0	7	24
Buccaneers	10	0	0	0	10

at Tampa Stadium, Tampa, Florida

Joe Montana completed 29 of 45 passes for 304 yards, and Jerry Rice caught 7 passes for 103 yards and three touchdowns. Quarterbacks Montana and Steve DeBerg entered the game as the number one- and two-rated passers in the NFC, respectively, but DeBerg was held to 205 yards passing. 2nd-year cornerback Rod Jones was victimized on two of Rice's touchdown receptions. On one of these, Rice found Jones in single coverage, and took the ball 42 yards by simply outrunning him. James Wilder Sr. carried the ball 11 times for 48 yards, and scored his first touchdown of the year on a screen pass. Two Buccaneer fourth-quarter scoring opportunities ended in turnovers.

=== Week 12: at Los Angeles Rams ===
	1	2	3	4	Total
Buccaneers	0	0	3	0	3
Rams	7	14	7	7	35

at Anaheim Stadium, Anaheim, California
Rams running back Charles White rushed for 137 yards and two touchdowns, while quarterback Jim Everett threw for 208 yards and another two touchdowns. The Buccaneers only entered Rams territory twice. According to coach Perkins, "The only guy who played with guts was Steve DeBerg." With two starting defensive linemen injured, the Buccaneers were forced to use three rookies, two of whom were making their NFL debuts. Early in the second quarter, a Mel Owens interception return set the Rams up for their second score, a run by White. White scored the Rams' third touchdown shortly afterward. After a Donald Igwebuike field goal early in the second half, the Buccaneers attempted an onside kick, but failed to gain possession. They never again crossed midfield. Sacked three times, DeBerg suffered a hyperextended back that resulted in his being replaced by Vinny Testaverde with 10:44 to play. "Beginning next week, we'll start making preparations for next year", Perkins said following the loss.

=== Week 13: at New Orleans Saints ===
	1	2	3	4	Total
Buccaneers	7	3	10	14	34
Saints	14	14	10	6	44

at Louisiana Superdome, New Orleans, Louisiana
The Saints, having achieved their first winning record in team history, clinched their first-ever playoff spot by defeating the Buccaneers 44–34. The Saints led the game for good after two early Vinny Testaverde fumbles deep in Buccaneer territory. Testaverde was given the starting job over Steve DeBerg, a change that was not revealed until gametime. "(Perkins) didn't want to give the Saints time to prepare for anything new", said Testaverde. In the second half, Testaverde made the Saints nervous by rallying the Buccaneers to score on four consecutive possessions. Mark Carrier's 212 yards on eight receptions set a team record, and Bruce Hill contributed 73 yards on five receptions. The rally lifted team spirits. "There's definitely some light at the end of the tunnel, and it's not a train", said Perkins. The rally came after a turbulent halftime, in which Ron Heller urged his teammates not to quit. Ray Perkins, hearing only the word "quit", punched Heller in the head, breaking his thumb on Heller's helmet. The Saints' first playoff-clinching win came on the tenth anniversary of the Buccaneers' first victory in franchise history, also a road game against the Saints.

=== Week 14: vs Detroit Lions ===
	1	2	3	4	Total
Lions	7	3	3	7	20
Buccaneers	0	3	0	7	10

at Tampa Stadium, Tampa, Florida
The Lions rushed for 190 yards, while holding the Buccaneers to 47. Lions quarterback Chuck Long was 12 of 23 for 108 yards and a touchdown, while Testaverde was 20–39 for 262 yards and a touchdown. The Lions intercepted Testaverde once and sacked him four times, as they broke a four-game losing streak. Testaverde was lucky that it was not worse, as three of his potential turnovers were called back due to Lions penalties. On another two occasions, balls that bounced off of his receivers' fingertips wound up caught by other Buccaneer receivers.

=== Week 15: vs St. Louis Cardinals ===
	1	2	3	4	Total
Cardinals	0	14	10	7	31
Buccaneers	7	0	0	7	14

at Tampa Stadium, Tampa, Florida
Tampa Bay led early, but Cardinal defensive back Cedric Mack recovered two Buccaneer fumbles that led to 10 Cardinal points. Neil Lomax tied a team record with 12 straight completions, completing 22–29 passes for 233 yards and three touchdowns. With Buc starting cornerback Rod Jones injured, Lomax exploited Bobby Futrell throughout the game. Stump Mitchell rushed for 101 yards and a touchdown.

=== Week 16: at Indianapolis Colts ===
	1	2	3	4	Total
Buccaneers	3	0	0	3	6
Colts	7	3	7	7	24

at Indianapolis Hoosierdome, Indianapolis, Indiana
The Colts' 24–6 victory over the Buccaneers clinched that franchise's first playoff berth, and first winning record, since 1977. Although Pro Bowl linebacker Duane Bickett did not play, the Colts' defense did not allow the Buccaneers inside the 20-yard line. Eric Dickerson ran 33 times for 196 yards and two touchdowns. Colts quarterback Jack Trudeau was 17 of 27 for 246 yards.
