= 1986 Tampa Bay Buccaneers season =

NFL team season

- Owner: Hugh Culverhouse
- Head coach: Leeman Bennett
- Home stadium: Tampa Stadium

Results
- Record: 2–14
- Division place: 5th NFC Central
- Playoffs: Did not qualify
- Pro Bowlers: None
- Team MVP: QB Steve Young

The 1986 Tampa Bay Buccaneers season was the franchise's 11th season in the National Football League playing their home games at Tampa Stadium and their second under head coach Leeman Bennett. The team matched their 2–14 season from 1985, for one of the worst seasons in franchise history, and according to statistics site Football Outsiders, the sixth-worst team in the NFL since 1950. There is some sentiment that the 1986 team was even worse than the winless team of 1976, and the 473 points conceded was not beaten by any NFL team until the 2001 Indianapolis Colts gave up 486. The Buccaneers selected Bo Jackson with the top pick in the draft, but were unable to convince him to join the team. Three weeks after the draft, Jackson signed a three-year baseball contract with the Kansas City Royals. Despite holding four of the first forty selections in the draft, and the presence of a great influx of fresh talent from defunct USFL teams, the Buccaneers were unable to find any impact players in either the draft or free agency. They entered the season with a roster nearly identical to the previous season's 2–14 team.

Coach Leeman Bennett treated the season as a rebuilding season, but was disappointed with the team's mental errors and lack of progress. Later in the season, he would begin to privately admit that the Buccaneers' talent was much worse than he had realized. Steve DeBerg won the starting quarterback job after outplaying Steve Young in the preseason, but was benched in favor of Young after struggling in the first two games. Kevin House and Jimmie Giles were released after an October loss to the New Orleans Saints, along with ex-Dallas Cowboys fullback Ron Springs. Bennett showed up at a press conference held after the season by owner Hugh Culverhouse, unaware that the purpose of the press conference was to announce Bennett's firing. Giles, then with the Detroit Lions, criticized the move, saying that no coach could compensate for the Buccaneers' lack of talent. He also claimed that administrator Phil Krueger destroyed team chemistry by demeaning players during contract negotiations, pointing to guard Sean Farrell's disgruntlement as an example.

== Offseason ==
Defensive end Lee Roy Selmon retired a week before the draft. He missed the entire 1985 season due to a herniated disk, and chose to retire rather than undergo surgery. Although his retirement was expected, the Buccaneers did not seek a replacement in the draft. With Mark Cotney and Steve Wilson having retired earlier in the year, Selmon was the last original Buccaneer on the roster.

=== NFL draft ===
Pick	Round	Player	Position	College
1	1	Bo Jackson	Running back	Auburn
25	1 (Note: from Miami)	Roderick Jones	Cornerback	Southern Methodist
28	2	Jackie Walker	Linebacker	Jackson State
40	2	Kevin Murphy	Linebacker	Oklahoma
83	4	Craig Swoope	Cornerback	Illinois
112	5	J.D. Maarleveld	Offensive tackle	Maryland
165	6 (Note: from New England)	Kevin Walker	Cornerback	East Carolina
223	9	Tommy Barnhardt	Punter	North Carolina
250	10	Benton Reed	Defensive end	Mississippi
279	11	Mark Drenth	Offensive tackle	Purdue
306	12 (Note: from San Francisco)	Clay Miller	Guard	Michigan

= Pro Bowler	= Hall of Famer

The Buccaneers received additional picks in the first and second rounds from the Miami Dolphins in exchange for linebacker Hugh Green. Their extra sixth-round pick came from the New England Patriots in exchange for a fifth-round pick in the 1987 draft. The second pick in the 12th round came from the San Francisco 49ers in return for the rights to center Jim Leonard. The Buccaneers’ third-round pick was traded to the New Orleans Saints for safety David Greenwood. Their sixth-round pick was traded to the Denver Broncos in exchange for defensive end Brison Manor. Their seventh-round pick went to the Buffalo Bills in exchange for wide receiver Perry Tuttle. Their 8th-round pick went to the Rams for defensive back Ivory Sully.

==== The Bo Jackson draft fiasco ====
Auburn University running back Bo Jackson was selected with the Buccaneers’ first overall pick in the draft, but refused to sign with them. Jackson was angry with the Buccaneers after accepting a private jet ride to attend a team workout caused him to lose his eligibility to play baseball at Auburn. Although NCAA rules allow a professional athlete to compete collegiately in a different sport, stricter Southeastern Conference rules disqualify a professional athlete from competing in any college sports. Jackson accused the Buccaneers of sabotaging his college baseball career, although Phil Krueger insisted that the SEC had advised them that the flight was allowable, and that it was Jackson himself who had insisted on using a private flight. Jackson had been rated as the best running back prospect to come out of college since O. J. Simpson 17 years earlier. Jackson was said to have ridiculed Tampa Bay's offensive line, and shortly before the baseball draft to have told two teams that he had no intention of playing football. Most teams did not believe him, but the Kansas City Royals, although they were unsure enough that they waited until the fourth round of the Major League Baseball draft to select him. Jackson vowed never to play football again and accepted an offer from the Royals worth much less than what the Buccaneers offered. The Buccaneers turned down several impressive trade offers for Jackson, including the San Francisco 49ers' offer of Ronnie Lott, Wendell Tyler, and first- and second-round draft picks. Jackson's statements about not playing football were contradictory, as he alternated between stating he didn't want to play at all and between saying he didn't want to play for a terrible team and organization like Tampa Bay. In his book, Jackson recalls a meeting with Al Davis where he said he liked Davis and told the Raider boss he would love to play for them, and that the Raiders made offers for the #1 pick to Tampa Bay that were spurned.

There was speculation that owner Hugh Culverhouse was torn between his promise to make Jackson the highest-paid rookie ever, and his status as a member of the NFL Finance Committee, which obligated him to set a reasonable fiscal precedent for the rest of the league. This resulted in an underwhelming contract offer and produced the perception that the Buccaneers were not serious about signing Jackson. Although the Buccaneers offered Jackson $7 million over the five years, half of it was in the form of incentives, annuities, and real estate. The actual salary averaged to over $700,000 per year, still more than twice his yearly salary from the Royals, who gave him a three-year, $1 million contract. Negotiator Phil Krueger said that officials from other NFL teams agreed that the Buccaneers had offered Jackson fair money; however, Jackson also recounted in his book that Culverhouse got angry when he turned out an initial offer and said the Bucs would cut their next offer by 50% if Jackson didn't accept the first contract by the following day. Jackson's Royals contract gave him the option of buying out his contract if he wanted to return to football. Jackson was eligible to be drafted again the next year if not signed by April 28, 1987, which turned out to be the case. Culverhouse announced the embarrassment at a news conference in which he quoted the "keep smiling, keep shining" lyrics of Dionne Warwick's then-current hit song "That's What Friends Are For". Jackson became the fourth consecutive Heisman Trophy winner (after USFL players Herschel Walker, Mike Rozier, and Doug Flutie) to spurn the NFL, although he was the first since Pete Dawkins in 1958 to leave football entirely. It was the first time since 1979, when Tom Cousineau signed with the Canadian Football League instead of the Buffalo Bills, that the first overall pick chose not to play in the NFL.

==== Other draft selections ====
Rod Jones was known as a hard hitter and a world-class track star, but was a controversial selection because, coming from the run-heavy Southwest Conference, his pass-coverage skills were unknown. At 5'11", 165 lbs., he was considered undersized for the NFL. Jones was the first defensive back selected, but was rated no better than fifth-best by most scouting services. The Buccaneers were criticized for taking linebacker Jackie Walker with their third pick, when Kevin Murphy of the national champion Oklahoma Sooners was still available. The Buccaneers did eventually draft Murphy, who they were surprised to find still available with their 40th overall selection. Murphy was believed to have fallen due to rumors of a knee injury. The Buccaneers had rated both Walker and Murphy among the top 15 players in the draft. Craig Swoope was rated as the best safety in the draft, but fell to the fourth round because of a previous charge (and acquittal) of conspiracy to distribute cocaine. Swoope was eventually the only Buccaneer to achieve any kind of postseason honors in 1986, being selected to the Football Digest All-Rookie team. The team went for big offensive linemen in the later rounds. One of them was J.D. Maarleveld, the first cancer patient drafted by the NFL. Maarleveld was considered to have been a second-round talent, but fell all the way to the fifth round. Belief that Maarleveld was worth much more money than the average fifth-rounder caused his agent, Greg Marotta, to advise him to reject the Buccaneers' offer and sign with the USFL Baltimore Stars. Maarleveld was eventually able to reach agreement with the Buccaneers.

== Preseason ==
=== Personnel moves ===
Bennett made efforts in the offseason to address the passing game, and to improve team speed. He held an extra "passing camp" before training camp for all offensive and defensive players involved in the passing game. Establishing the offense was complicated by the situation of not having enough reliable running backs to run a two-back offense. Finding enough speedy receivers to run a three-receiver set was also difficult, as was finding faster defensive backs who could play the man-to-man coverage that Bennett wanted to move to. Cutting safety David Greenwood and trading cornerback John Holt improved the speed of the secondary by opening up starting spots for rookies Jones and Swoope. Former Florida Gators cornerback Vito McKeever, a product of local Dunnellon High School who had played for the USFL Michigan Panthers under Buccaneer defensive coordinator Jim Stanley, was signed toward the end of preseason. The addition of McKeever, who took over Jeremiah Castille's starting spot, meant that three of the four secondary positions turned over from the previous year. The quest for speed in the secondary meant cutting safety and punt returner Mike Prior, who went on to become a mainstay on the Green Bay Packer playoff teams of the 1990s. In an attempt to upgrade the offensive line, five-time Pro Bowl tackle Marvin Powell was brought in. While there was speculation that the New York Jets let him go because he was President of the National Football League Players Association, the Jets were concerned over quarterback Ken O'Brien having been sacked an NFL-record 62 times the previous season, and selected two tackles in the draft. There was sentiment among some teams that, despite his Pro Bowl appearances, Powell was an overrated player who had never lived up to his reputation. Powell performed well for Tampa Bay, but was placed on injured reserve midseason after undergoing arthroscopic knee surgery. Undrafted free-agent running back Nathan Wonsley emerged in the preseason as a legitimate complement to James Wilder Sr. Tyrone Keys, a defensive end from a team loaded with pass-rushers, and David Williams, a receiver who had led the nation in catches during his junior year, were claimed off waivers from the defending world champion Chicago Bears.

== Regular season ==
Steve DeBerg won the starting quarterback job over Steve Young in the preseason, but lost it after throwing seven interceptions in the season opener against the San Francisco 49ers, and another two the next week against the Minnesota Vikings. Nose tackle Dave Logan summed up the team's condition after the 49ers game by saying, "the teams we play do not respect us". Players coming from winning teams to the Buccaneers, such as Marvin Powell and Tyrone Keys, found themselves shocked by the constant losing and discouraged by the team's easy acceptance of losses. Keys in particular thought that the Buccaneers were too used to losing, and not bothered by it. Young later criticized the team's will to win, saying that "if they could hide for four-quarters and just go home, they would be happy". Powell, one of the highest-paid offensive linemen in the league, was placed on injured reserve with a knee injury after only a few games. An embarrassing loss to the New Orleans Saints was followed by the release of Jimmie Giles and Kevin House, the top two receivers in Buccaneer history at the time, and former starting fullback Ron Springs. This upset several club veterans, and weakened an offense that already had to compensate for a defense that had allowed over 1,000 rushing yards in the previous four games. League perception was that the Buccaneers were replacing older veterans with younger players who were incapable of taking their places. Said an executive from another team of Giles' replacement, "Calvin Magee runs a 5.2 40...We wouldn't even bring him into camp". Rumors, denied by Culverhouse, began to circulate that secret meetings were being held to arrange replacing Bennett with Steve Spurrier. Nathan Wonsley, the rookie free-agent running back whose play was one of the few bright spots in the season, was lost to the team after suffering dislocated neck vertebrae during a week 10 loss to the Chicago Bears. After the abnormally large number of injuries suffered during the Bears game, the Buccaneers ended their pattern of suffering fourth-quarter collapses in close games, instead losing their last seven games by an average of over 21 points. With Jerry Bell, a tight end who played a "U-back" position that was crucial to Tampa Bay's running game, suffering a broken ankle in the same game, the Buccaneers were forced to re-sign Ron Springs just to have enough runners in their backfield. Culverhouse, saying that he had made the decision only minutes prior, fired Bennett at a press conference on Dec. 29. Bennett, who had spoken to Culverhouse earlier the same morning, was unaware that he was to be let go. Culverhouse met with Ray Perkins and offered him the Tampa Bay coaching job only hours after firing Bennett. The firing was criticized by some, who felt that no steps were being taken to address the front-office problems that were the real root of the Buccaneers' woes. This criticism was echoed by safety David Greenwood, by then with the Packers, who pointed out the team's cheapness by recounting a 1985 incident in which he wanted to keep a football as a game ball after catching it for an interception. Executive Phil Krueger demanded that Greenwood pay $35 for the football.

== 1986 roster ==
Tampa Bay Buccaneers 1986 roster
**Quarterbacks**: 17 Steve Deberg; 8 **Steve Young**; **Running backs**: 28 Greg Allen; 38 Dennis Bligen; 35 Pat Franklin; 25 Bobby Howard; 20 **Ron Springs**; **Wide receivers**: 87 **Gerald Carter**; 81 **Phil Freeman**; 83 Willie Gillespie; 89 Vince Heflin; 80 David Williams; **Tight ends**: 85 K. D. Dunn; 86 **Calvin Magee**	**Offensive linemen**: 62 **Sean Farrell** G; 60 **Randy Grimes** C; 73 **Ron Heller** T; 77 J. D. Maarleveld T; 68 Rick Mallory G; 64 Greg Robinson T; 72 **Rob Taylor** T; 66 **George Yarno** G; **Defensive linemen**: 78 **John Cannon** LDE; 90 **Ron Holmes** RDE; 75 Kevin Kellin DE; 76 **Dave Logan** NT; 71 **Bob Nelson** LDE	**Linebackers**: 52 **Scot Brantley** RILB; 57 **Keith Browner** LOLB; 58 **Jeff Davis** LILB; 59 Kevin Murphy OLB; 54 Ervin Randle ILB; 56 Jackie Walker LOLB; 51 **Chris Washington** ROLB; **Defensive backs**: 23 **Jeremiah Castille** LCB; 31 **Craig Curry** FS; 26 Ricky Easmon LCB; 36 Bobby Futrell CB; 22 **Rod Jones** RCB; 21 **Vito McKeever** LCB; 44 **Ivory Sully** FS/SS; 41 **Craig Swoope** SS; 37 Kevin Walker CB; **Special teams**: 1 Donald Igwebuike K; 5 Frank Garcia P	**Reserve lists**: 82 Jerry Bell TE (IR); 34 Mack Boatner RB (IR); 65 Don Fielder DE (IR); 84 Leonard Harris WR (IR); 98 Tyrone Keys DE (IR); 74 Marvin Powell T (IR); 88 Jeff Spek TE (IR); 32 **James Wilder** RB (IR); 46 Nathan Wonsley RB (IR); rookies in italics **Starters in boldface**

== Coaching staff ==
Tampa Bay Buccaneers 1986 coaching staff
Front office: Owner – Hugh Culverhouse; Head coaches: Head coach and president of football operations – Leeman Bennett; Offensive coaches: Offensive coordinator/quarterbacks – Jimmy Raye II; Running backs – Vic Rapp; Wide receivers – Larry Seiple; Offensive line – Kim Helton; Offensive aide – Greg Brown	Defensive coaches: Defensive coordinator/secondary – Jim Stanley; Defensive line – Don Lawrence; Linebackers – Howard Tippett; Defensive backs – Dick Roach; Defensive aide – Mark Cotney; Special teams coaches: Special teams coordinator – Howard Tippett; Strength and conditioning – Joe Diange

== Schedule ==
Week	Date	Opponent	Result	Record	Game site	Attendance
1	September 7	San Francisco 49ers	**L** 31–7	0–1	Tampa Stadium	50,780
2	September 14	**Minnesota Vikings**	**L** 23–10	0–2	Tampa Stadium	34,579
3	September 21	at **Detroit Lions**	**W** 24–20	1–2	Pontiac Silverdome	38,453
4	September 28	Atlanta Falcons	**L** 23–20(OT)	1–3	Tampa Stadium	38,950
5	October 5	at Los Angeles Rams	**L** 26–20(OT)	1–4	Anaheim Coliseum	50,585
6	October 12	St. Louis Cardinals	**L** 30–19	1–5	Tampa Stadium	33,307
7	October 19	at New Orleans Saints	**L** 38–7	1–6	Louisiana Superdome	43,355
8	October 26	at Kansas City Chiefs	**L** 27–20	1–7	Arrowhead Stadium	36,230
9	November 2	Buffalo Bills	**W** 34–28	2–7	Tampa Stadium	32,806
10	November 9	**Chicago Bears**	**L** 23–3	2–8	Tampa Stadium	70,097
11	November 16	at **Green Bay Packers**	**L** 31–7	2–9	Lambeau Field	48,271
12	November 23	**Detroit Lions**	**L** 38–17	2–10	Tampa Stadium	30,029
13	November 30	at **Minnesota Vikings**	**L** 45–13	2–11	Hubert H. Humphrey Metrodome	56,235
14	December 7	at **Chicago Bears**	**L** 48–14	2–12	Soldier Field	52,746
15	December 14	**Green Bay Packers**	**L** 21–7	2–13	Tampa Stadium	30,099
16	December 21	at St. Louis Cardinals	**L** 21–17	2–14	Busch Memorial Stadium	23,957
Note: Division opponents in **bold** text.

=== Game summaries ===
==== Week 1: vs San Francisco 49ers ====
	1	2	3	4	Total
**49ers**	14	0	3	14	**31**
Buccaneers	0	0	7	0	**7**

at Tampa Stadium, Tampa, Florida
San Francisco 49ers quarterback Joe Montana completed 32 of 46 passes for 356 yards before leaving the game with an injury in the fourth quarter. The injury, similar to the one that ended Lee Roy Selmon's career, would require season-ending surgery and threaten Montana's football future. Steve DeBerg's 31-yard touchdown pass to Gerald Carter in the third quarter brought the Buccaneers to within a touchdown, but they would not score again. The 49ers' seven interceptions of DeBerg were a team record, and one short of the NFL record. DeBerg placed blame for the loss on himself, but teammates defended him, pointing out that he was under constant pressure from the 49ers' pass rush. Opposing safety Ronnie Lott said that DeBerg was predictable as to where he would throw the ball when pressured. James Wilder rushed for 81 yards and caught five passes. Selmon's number 63 was retired in a halftime ceremony.

==== Week 2: vs Minnesota Vikings ====
	1	2	3	4	Total
**Vikings**	10	7	0	6	**23**
Buccaneers	3	7	0	0	**10**

at Tampa Stadium, Tampa, Florida
Early in the first quarter, James Wilder tipped a pass from Steve DeBerg into the hands of Vikings linebacker Chris Doleman, who returned it for a touchdown. Wilder took a helmet to the sternum on this play, leaving a deep bruise that caused him to miss the next two games, and reduced his effectiveness for the remainder of the season. Seventeen seconds later, Scott Studwell recovered a Wilder fumble at the Tampa Bay 18-yard line, leading to a Viking field goal. The Buccaneers added a Donald Igwebuike field goal before the end of the quarter, but the Vikings answered it with a touchdown pass from Tommy Kramer to Mike Mularkey. DeBerg's 1-yard touchdown pass to Jimmie Giles brought the Buccaneers to within a touchdown before halftime, but they were unable to score in the second half. The Buccaneers outperformed the Vikings in a number of statistical categories, but could not overcome the turnovers.

==== Week 3: at Detroit Lions ====
	1	2	3	4	Total
**Buccaneers**	0	14	10	0	**24**
Lions	0	3	3	14	**20**

at Pontiac Silverdome, Pontiac, Michigan
With running back James Wilder nursing a bruised sternum, Nathan Wonsley rushed for 138 yards and two touchdowns. Wonsley became the first Buccaneer running back, other than Wilder, to rush for 100 yards since Nov. 29, 1981. He was the first Tampa Bay rookie to rush for 100 yards since Jerry Eckwood in 1979. Wonsley followed in the footsteps of his two older brothers, George and Otis, both backup NFL running backs who came off the bench to have breakout games while leading their respective teams to victory against the Lions. Constant Buccaneer blitzes resulted in four sacks, two interceptions, and six forced fumbles. Although Lions quarterback Eric Hipple had a good statistical day, completing 31 passes for 318 yards, the Tampa Bay defense's pressure prevented him from converting his opportunities into points. The win broke Tampa Bay's 19-game road losing streak.

==== Week 4: vs Atlanta Falcons ====
at Tampa Stadium, Tampa, Florida

	1	2	3	4	OT	Total
**Falcons**	7	0	7	6	3	**23**
Buccaneers	3	17	0	0	0	**20**

The Atlanta Falcons overcame a 20–7 halftime deficit to defeat the Buccaneers in overtime on a Mick Luckhurst field goal. The strategy of running out the clock with a conservative offense that had worked so well against the Lions the previous week backfired against the Falcons. The Buccaneers' offensive line failed to dominate, and the Falcons wound up running 57 offensive plays in the second half, while the Buccaneers ran only 26. Twenty of those plays were runs by Gerald Riggs, who finished the day with 127 yards rushing. The Buccaneers outgained the Falcons 255 yards to 190 in the first half, but were outgained 300 yards to 68 in the second half, in which the Buccaneers never advanced beyond midfield. The win left Atlanta undefeated at 4–0.

==== Week 5: at Los Angeles Rams ====
	1	2	3	4	OT	Total
Buccaneers	0	10	7	3	0	**20**
**Rams**	14	3	0	3	6	**26**

at Anaheim Coliseum, Anaheim, California
Eric Dickerson earned his fourth career 200-yard rushing game with a 42-yard touchdown run to win the game in overtime for the Los Angeles Rams. Steve Young led an 80-yard drive in the fourth quarter that ended in a Donald Igwebuike field goal and sent the game into overtime, but the Buccaneers were unable to stop Dickerson all day. It was the second consecutive overtime loss for the Buccaneers. Nathan Wonsley rushed 18 times for 108 yards and a 59-yard touchdown run. Young also ran for a touchdown. Bennett was again criticized after the game for conservative play-calling, although the Buccaneers' total of 174 rushing yards was more than double the average the Rams had allowed in their previous four games. The game left Wonsley as the NFL leader in rushing average, with 5.7 yards per carry. Dickerson continued to lead the NFL in rushing with 657 yards, 159 ahead of his record-setting pace from 1984.

==== Week 6: vs St. Louis Cardinals ====
at Tampa Stadium, Tampa, Florida

	1	2	3	4	Total
**Cardinals**	0	9	7	14	**30**
Buccaneers	7	0	0	12	**19**

The Buccaneers were once again criticized for poor tackling and conservative play-calling following a loss to a previously winless St. Louis Cardinals team. This time, complaints came from the players as the Cardinals seemed to know in advance which plays the Buccaneers would be running, and the Buccaneers waited until too late in the game to make adjustments. The Buccaneers led early, after Steve DeBerg's touchdown pass to Calvin Magee on a fake field goal. Steve Young's rushing and passing combined for 304 of the Buccaneers' 347 yards. The Cardinals unexpectedly used a soft zone defense instead of their usual blitzing, which contributed to Tampa Bay's decision to avoid the passing game until the fourth quarter. The Cardinals put the game away with Stump Mitchell's 31-yard fourth-quarter touchdown run, in which three Buccaneers missed tackles. Ron Holmes, Jeremiah Castille, Marvin Powell, and Gerald Carter all missed the game with injuries.

==== Week 7: at New Orleans Saints ====
	1	2	3	4	Total
Buccaneers	0	0	0	7	**7**
**Saints**	10	7	7	14	**38**

at Louisiana Superdome, New Orleans
Reuben Mayes rushed for 147 yards, the second-most in New Orleans Saints history, as the Saints equalled their highest-ever margin of victory. The Saints scored on their first three possessions. The Buccaneers did not score until the fourth quarter, when Steve DeBerg ran for a 1-yard touchdown. Steve Young left the stadium on crutches, and starting defensive end Ron Holmes left the game after trying to play the first quarter with a broken fibula. Mayes was selected with a third-round draft pick that had been obtained from the Buccaneers in exchange for safety David Greenwood, who the Buccaneers had already waived.

==== Week 8: at Kansas City Chiefs ====
	1	2	3	4	Total
Buccaneers	3	10	0	7	**20**
**Chiefs**	7	3	10	7	**27**

at Arrowhead Stadium, Kansas City, Missouri
Veteran quarterback Bill Kenney, making the start for the Kansas City Chiefs in place of the struggling Todd Blackledge, completed 15 of 29 passes for 230 yards and a touchdown. The Chiefs' offensive line protected Kenney well, allowing only one sack and few hurries. Although the Buccaneers led at halftime on a 10-yard pass from Steve Young to Calvin Magee and two Donald Igwebuike field goals, they were unable to hold the lead in the second half. They tied the game at 20 on a fourth-quarter touchdown run, James Wilder's first of the year, but immediately allowed the Chiefs to drive the length of the field for the winning touchdown. The sloppily played game included four fumbles, six sacks, two interceptions, and 17 penalties for 146 yards. Art Still contributed three of the Chiefs' five sacks.

==== Week 9: vs Buffalo Bills ====
at Tampa Stadium, Tampa, Florida

	1	2	3	4	Total
Bills	0	0	14	14	**28**
**Buccaneers**	10	10	0	14	**34**

The Buccaneers took a 20–0 halftime lead over the Buffalo Bills after recovering fumbles on two kickoffs and held on for the victory, with a pass from Bills quarterback Jim Kelly falling incomplete in the end zone on the last play of the game. Steve Young completed 14 of 24 passes for 193 yards, and ran for two touchdowns. James Wilder also contributed a 45-yard touchdown run. The Bills only threw two passes in the first half but opened up the gameplan in the second, with Kelly completing 21 of 32 passes for 257 yards and three touchdowns in the last two quarters. The rally fell short, the Bills lost their 31st consecutive road game, and Buffalo coach Hank Bullough was fired and replaced by Marv Levy days later.

In the postgame news conference, Bucs coach Leeman Bennett declared the win to be "the start of a new season." However, it would be the last victory for Tampa Bay during his coaching tenure.

==== Week 10: vs Chicago Bears ====
at Tampa Stadium, Tampa, Florida

	1	2	3	4	Total
**Bears**	14	3	0	6	**23**
Buccaneers	3	0	0	0	**3**

Doug Flutie made his NFL debut in the fourth quarter for the Chicago Bears. The Bears took an early 14–0 lead after Mike Tomczak's 37-yard touchdown pass to Willie Gault. The play occurred after Ervin Randle's recovery of a Calvin Thomas fumble was nullified due to an offsides penalty on Craig Swoope. While the Buccaneers' defense improved later in the game, it was not enough to overcome the problems of the injury-battered offense. Nathan Wonsley suffered a broken neck while making a tackle on the opening kickoff. This was followed by injuries to Jerry Bell, Phil Freeman, Craig Swoope, and Willie Gillespie. Calvin Magee played with a prior injury, as did James Wilder and Leonard Harris, though both were forced to leave the game. With Gerald Carter left as the only experienced receiver, the Bears keyed on him, and with Bell, Wonsley and Wilder out, the Buccaneers could not run.

==== Week 11: at Green Bay Packers ====
	1	2	3	4	Total
Buccaneers	0	0	0	7	**7**
**Packers**	14	7	10	0	**31**

at Lambeau Field, Green Bay, Wisconsin
With James Wilder leaving the game after aggravating his rib injury, the Buccaneers were unable to take advantage of Green Bay Packers quarterback Randy Wright's three interceptions. Wright completed 18 of 29 passes for 238 yards, with a career-best three first-half touchdowns. The win was only the Packers' second of the season. The loss left the Buccaneers' defense in last place in the league, despite their having spent four of their first five draft picks on defensive players.

==== Week 12: vs Detroit Lions ====
at Tampa Stadium, Tampa, Florida

	1	2	3	4	Total
**Lions**	7	7	14	10	**38**
Buccaneers	3	0	7	7	**17**

Three first-half possessions deep in Detroit Lions territory led to zero Buccaneer points en route to another blowout loss. Lions receiver Jeff Chadwick took a 73-yard reception to the Buccaneers' 1-yard line when Rod Jones fell down while covering him. Jones also got beaten by Leonard Thompson on a jump ball in the end zone. Vito McKeever was outrun by Chadwick on the Lions' third score. James Wilder had 130 yards rushing and 71 yards receiving for the Buccaneers.

==== Week 13: at Minnesota Vikings ====
	1	2	3	4	Total
Buccaneers	0	6	0	7	**13**
**Vikings**	7	7	7	24	**45**

at Hubert H. Humphrey Metrodome, Minneapolis
With Tommy Kramer injured, Vikings quarterback Wade Wilson threw for a career-best 339 yards and three touchdowns. With Tampa Bay down by 45–6, Steve DeBerg's 45-yard pass to Calvin Magee set up a 1-yard touchdown pass to Ron Heller on a tackle-eligible play. The Buccaneers' only other offense came on two Donald Igwebuike field goals.

==== Week 14: at Chicago Bears ====
	1	2	3	4	Total
Buccaneers	0	0	0	14	**14**
**Bears**	7	21	14	6	**48**

at Soldier Field, Chicago
The Buccaneers almost exceeded their worst-ever loss, a 42–0 loss to the Pittsburgh Steelers, on its 10th anniversary. They were shut out until the fourth quarter, and only scored when Chicago Bears safety Todd Bell intercepted a Steve Young pass and lateraled it to Mike Richardson, who attempted to lateral it to Shaun Gayle, only to have Tampa Bay receiver Vince Heflin intercept the lateral and run it in for a score. Mike Tomczak ran for the Bears' first score. Later, a Walter Payton touchdown was called back on a holding penalty. The Buccaneers stopped the Bears on fourth-and-1, but an offside penalty on Craig Swoope gave the Bears another chance. Tomczak fumbled, however, causing him to be benched in favor of Doug Flutie. Flutie scored two touchdowns, one passing and one running, before Tomczak returned in the second half. Tampa Bay scored a second time on Young's 14-yard pass to Calvin Magee, but Lew Barnes returned the ensuing kickoff for a touchdown. Magee's 143 receiving yards remain (as of 2009) the Buccaneers' single-game record for a tight end.

==== Week 15: vs Green Bay Packers ====
	1	2	3	4	Total
**Packers**	0	7	7	7	**21**
Buccaneers	0	0	0	7	**7**

at Tampa Stadium, Tampa, Florida
The Green Bay Packers had seven different players each contribute a sack, and Randy Wright's 190 yards passing made him the second player in Packers history to throw for 3,000 yards in a season. The crowd cheered the news that an Indianapolis Colts win moved the Buccaneers into first place for the rights to the first overall draft pick, and pelted Buccaneer players with lemons. Ron Holmes's sack of Wright was the Buccaneers' first since October 12, and Ivory Sully recorded the first blocked punt in Buccaneers regular-season history. Both teams went to their second-string quarterbacks in the second half, but Steve Young returned to the game after Steve DeBerg suffered a concussion, and Wright was reinserted after the Buccaneers threatened to start a comeback.

==== Week 16: at St. Louis Cardinals ====
	1	2	3	4	Total
Buccaneers	7	0	10	0	**17**
**Cardinals**	0	21	0	0	**21**

at Busch Stadium, St. Louis, Missouri
St. Louis Cardinals Pro Bowl rookie Vai Sikahema tied an NFL record by returning two punts for touchdowns as the Buccaneers clinched the NFL's worst record for the second consecutive year. Frank Garcia, playing with a back injury, had a third punt blocked for a net gain of 1 yard. The Buccaneers scored first, on a 1-yard Bobby Howard run, but the Cardinals' 21 unanswered points gave them the lead for good before halftime. A 33-yard touchdown pass from Steve Young to Phil Freeman brought the Buccaneers to within 4 points in the third quarter. The game not only ended a futile season for the Buccaneers, but also concluded the Cardinals’ worst season since moving to St. Louis 27 years earlier.

=== Standings ===
NFC Central
	W	L	T	PCT	DIV	CONF	PF	PA	STK
Chicago Bears^{(2)}	14	2	0	.875	7–1	10–2	352	187	W7
Minnesota Vikings	9	7	0	.563	6–2	8–4	398	273	W1
Detroit Lions	5	11	0	.313	3–5	4–8	277	326	L4
Green Bay Packers	4	12	0	.250	3–5	3–9	254	418	L1
Tampa Bay Buccaneers	2	14	0	.125	1–7	1–13	239	473	L7
