= 1986 New Orleans Saints season =

NFL team season

- Owner: Tom Benson
- General manager: Jim Finks
- Head coach: Jim Mora
- Home stadium: Louisiana Superdome

Results
- Record: 7–9
- Division place: 4th NFC West
- Playoffs: Did not qualify
- Pro Bowlers: RB Reuben Mayes; LB Rickey Jackson; LB Sam Mills; K Morten Andersen

The 1986 New Orleans Saints season was the team's 20th as a member of the National Football League. They improved upon their previous season's output of 5–11, winning seven games.

== Offseason ==
=== Organizational changes ===
On January 14, owner Tom Benson hired Jim Finks as the franchise's general manager, and turned over the entire football operation to the veteran operative who previously built championship clubs with the Minnesota Vikings and Chicago Bears. Finks was hired two days after the Bears won the NFC championship to clinch a berth in Super Bowl XX at the Louisiana Superdome.

Two days after the Bears team largely constructed by Finks defeated the New England Patriots 46-10, Finks hired Jim Mora as the new head coach. Mora was the most successful coach in the history of the United States Football League, leading the Philadelphia/Baltimore Stars to two USFL championships and a runner-up finish.

=== NFL draft ===
1986 New Orleans Saints draft
Round	Pick	Player	Position	College	Notes
1	6	Jim Dombrowski	Offensive tackle	Virginia	
2	31	Dalton Hilliard *	Running back	LSU	
3	57	Rueben Mayes *	Running back	Washington State	
3	60	Pat Swilling *	Linebacker	Georgia Tech	
3	62	Barry Word	Running back	Virginia	
4	88	Kelvin Edwards	Wide receiver	Liberty	
5	115	Reggie Sutton	Cornerback	Miami (FL)	
6	142	Bob Thompson	Wide receiver	Youngstown State	
7	173	Gill Fenerty	Running back	Holy Cross	
8	200	Filipo Mokofisi	Linebacker	Utah	
9	226	Merlon Jones	Linebacker	Florida A&M	
10	253	Jon Dumbauld	Defensive end	Kentucky	
11	284	Pat Swoopes	Defensive tackle	Mississippi State	
12	311	Sebastian Brown	Wide receiver	Bethune-Cookman	
Made roster * Made at least one Pro Bowl during career

== Personnel ==
=== Staff ===
1986 New Orleans Saints staff
Front office: Owner/General Partner – Tom Benson; President/General Manager – Jim Finks; Vice President of Administration – Jim Miller; Director of Player Personnel – Bill Kuharich; Head coaches: Head Coach – Jim Mora; Offensive coaches: Offensive Coordinator/Quarterbacks – Carl Smith; Running Backs – Jim Skipper; Wide Receivers – Steve Walters; Offensive Line – Jim Erkenbeck	Defensive coaches: Defensive Coordinator – Steve Sidwell; Defensive Line – John Pease; Linebackers – Vic Fangio; Defensive Backs – Dom Capers; Special teams coaches: Special Teams/Tight Ends – Joe Marciano; Strength and conditioning: Strength and Conditioning – Russell Paternostro

=== Roster ===
1986 New Orleans Saints roster
Quarterbacks (QB): 3 Bobby Hebert; 18 Dave Wilson; Running backs (RB): 37 Mel Gray; 40 Dalton Hilliard; 23 Buford Jordan; 36 Rueben Mayes; 30 Wayne Wilson; Wide receivers (WR): 83 Kelvin Edwards; 88 Eugene Goodlow; 80 Herbert Harris; 86 Mike Jones; 84 Eric Martin; Tight ends (TE): 85 Hoby Brenner; 82 John Tice	Offensive linemen (OL): 67 Stan Brock T; 69 Chuck Commiskey G; 70 Bill Contz T; 63 Brad Edelman G; 77 Daren Gilbert T; 61 Joel Hilgenberg G/C; 60 Steve Korte C; 68 Pat Saindon G; Defensive linemen (DL): 96 Sheldon Andrus NT; 75 Bruce Clark DE; 95 Jon Dumbauld DE; 97 Jumpy Geathers DE; 73 Frank Warren DE; 94 Jim Wilks DE	Linebackers (LB): 50 Jack Del Rio ILB; 92 James Haynes OLB; 57 Rickey Jackson OLB; 53 Vaughan Johnson ILB; 55 Joe Kohlbrand OLB; 51 Sam Mills ILB; 56 Pat Swilling OLB; 54 Alvin Toles ILB; Defensive backs (DB): 27 Antonio Gibson SS; 24 Bobby Johnson SS; 39 Brett Maxie FS; 42 Dana McLemore CB; 25 Johnnie Poe CB; 49 Frank Wattelet FS; 44 Dave Waymer CB; Special teams (ST): 7 Morten Andersen K; 10 Brian Hansen P	Reserve: 72 Jim Dombrowski T (IR); 99 Tony Elliott NT (IR); 43 Bobby Fowler RB (IR); 46 Hokie Gajan RB (IR); 22 Van Jakes CB (IR); 71 Casey Merrill DE (IR); 29 Reggie Sutton CB (NF-Ill.); 45 John Williams RB (IR); 79 Ralph Williams G (IR); Rookies in italics

== Schedule ==
Week	Date	Opponent	Result	Record	Venue	Attendance	Recap
1	September 7	**Atlanta Falcons**	**L** 10–31	0–1	Louisiana Superdome	67,950	Recap
2	September 14	Green Bay Packers	**W** 24–10	1–1	Louisiana Superdome	46,383	Recap
3	September 21	at **San Francisco 49ers**	**L** 17–26	1–2	Candlestick Park	58,297	Recap
4	September 28	at New York Giants	**L** 17–20	1–3	Giants Stadium	72,769	Recap
5	October 5	Washington Redskins	**L** 6–14	1–4	Louisiana Superdome	57,378	Recap
6	October 12	at Indianapolis Colts	**W** 17–14	2–4	Hoosier Dome	53,512	Recap
7	October 19	Tampa Bay Buccaneers	**W** 38–7	3–4	Louisiana Superdome	43,355	Recap
8	October 26	at New York Jets	**L** 23–28	3–5	Giants Stadium	44,246	Recap
9	November 2	**San Francisco 49ers**	**W** 23–10	4–5	Louisiana Superdome	53,234	Recap
10	November 9	**Los Angeles Rams**	**W** 6–0	5–5	Louisiana Superdome	62,532	Recap
11	November 16	at St. Louis Cardinals	**W** 16–7	6–5	Busch Memorial Stadium	32,069	Recap
12	November 23	at **Los Angeles Rams**	**L** 13–26	6–6	Anaheim Stadium	58,600	Recap
13	November 30	New England Patriots	**L** 20–21	6–7	Louisiana Supedome	58,259	Recap
14	December 7	Miami Dolphins	**L** 27–31	6–8	Louisiana Superdome	64,761	Recap
15	December 14	at **Atlanta Falcons**	**W** 14–9	7–8	Atlanta–Fulton County Stadium	39,994	Recap
16	December 21	at Minnesota Vikings	**L** 17–33	7–9	Hubert H. Humphrey Metrodome	51,209	Recap
Note: Intra-division opponents are in **bold** text.

=== Week 1 ===
Atlanta Falcons (0–0) at New Orleans Saints (0–0)

Quarter	1	2	3	4	Total
Falcons	7	7	7	10	**31**
Saints	0	3	0	7	**10**

at Louisiana Superdome, New Orleans, Louisiana

- Date: September 7
- Game weather: Indoors (dome)
- Game attendance: 67,950
- Referee: Tom Dooley
- The Football Database

Game information

Falcons

- David Archer
  13/16, 207 Yds, 2 TD, INT
- Cliff Austin
  27 Rush, 104 Yds, TD
- Charlie Brown
  7 Rec, 119 Yds, TD

Saints

- Bobby Hebert
  13/33, 115 Yds, 2 INT
- Dalton Hilliard
  15 Rush, 51 Yds, TD
- Eugene Goodlow
  4 Rec, 58 Yds

Scoring summary

Quarter	Time	Drive			Team	Scoring information	Score	
Quarter	Time	Plays	Yards	TOP	Team	Scoring information	ATL	NO
1	10:17				Falcons	Brown 17-yard touchdown reception from Archer, Luckhurst kick good	7	0
2	7:43				Falcons	Austin 1-yard touchdown run, Luckhurst kick good	14	0
2	1:01				Saints	47-yard field goal by Andersen	14	3
3	2:21				Falcons	Riggs 1-yard touchdown run, Luckhurst kick good	21	3
4	10:12				Falcons	Anthony Allen 19-yard touchdown reception from Archer, Luckhurst kick good	28	3
4	3:30				Falcons	32-yard field goal by Luckhurst	31	3
4	0:08				Saints	Hilliard 1-yard touchdown run, Andersen kick good	10	31
"TOP" = time of possession. For other American football terms, see Glossary of American football.							31	10

=== Week 2 ===
Green Bay Packers (0–1) at New Orleans Saints (0–1)

Quarter	1	2	3	4	Total
Packers	0	3	7	0	**10**
Saints	17	7	0	0	**24**

at Louisiana Superdome, New Orleans, Louisiana

- Date: September 14
- Game weather: Indoors (dome)
- Game attendance: 46,383
- Referee: Chuck Heberling
- The Football Database

Game information

Packers

- Randy Wright
  18/44, 195 Yds, TD, 5 INT
- Gary Ellerson
  9 Rush, 33 Yds
- James Lofton
  8 Rec, 100 Yds, TD

Saints

- Bobby Hebert
  9/14, 200 Yds, TD, 2 INT
- Dalton Hilliard
  24 Rush, 59 Yds, TD
- Eric Martin
  3 Rec, 164 Yds, TD

Scoring summary

Quarter	Time	Drive			Team	Scoring information	Score	
Quarter	Time	Plays	Yards	TOP	Team	Scoring information	GB	NO
1	13:28				Saints	Martin 72-yard touchdown reception from Hebert, Andersen kick good	0	7
1	6:42				Saints	20-yard field goal by Andersen	0	10
1	3:38				Saints	Hilliard 3-yard touchdown run, Andersen kick good	0	17
2	14:25				Packers	50-yard field goal by Del Greco	3	17
2	5:00				Saints	Interception returned 17 yards for touchdown by Haynes, Andersen kick good	3	24
4	1:17				Packers	Lofton 8-yard touchdown reception from Wright, Del Greco kick good	10	24
"TOP" = time of possession. For other American football terms, see Glossary of American football.							10	24

== Standings ==
NFC West
	W	L	T	PCT	DIV	CONF	PF	PA	STK
San Francisco 49ers^{(3)}	10	5	1	.656	3–2–1	6–5–1	374	247	W3
Los Angeles Rams^{(5)}	10	6	0	.625	3–3	8–4	309	267	L2
Atlanta Falcons	7	8	1	.469	2–3–1	6–5–1	280	280	W1
New Orleans Saints	7	9	0	.438	3–3	6–6	288	287	L1
