= Wonsley =

Wonsley is a surname. Notable people with the surname include:

- George Wonsley (born 1960), American football player
- Nathan Wonsley (born 1963), American football player
- Otis Wonsley (born 1957), American football player
- Robin Wonsley (born 1991), American politician
