= 1986 Atlanta Falcons season =

21st season in franchise history, collapse after 4-0 start

- Head coach: Dan Henning
- Home stadium: Fulton County Stadium

Results
- Record: 7–8–1
- Division place: 3rd NFC West
- Playoffs: Did not qualify
- Pro Bowlers: 2: G Bill Fralic; RB Gerald Riggs

The 1986 Atlanta Falcons season was the franchise's 21st season in the National Football League (NFL). It began with moderate expectations. Head coach Dan Henning was going into his fourth year having failed to post a record above .500 in any of his first three seasons. Local media, including the Atlanta Journal-Constitution, saw it as Henning's last chance to save his head coaching job. Atlanta entered the season led by, among others, Gerald Riggs, Scott Case, Bill Fralic and Jeff Van Note. David Archer was the starting quarterback heading into the season.

The Falcons won their first 4 games, but their season was effectively ruined by going 3–8–1 afterwards.

== Offseason ==
=== NFL draft ===
1986 Atlanta Falcons draft
Round	Pick	Player	Position	College	Notes
1	2	Tony Casillas	Defensive tackle	Oklahoma	
1	17	Tim Green	Linebacker	Syracuse	
6	154	Floyd Dixon	Wide receiver	Stephen F. Austin	
6	159	Keith Williams	Wide receiver	Missouri State	
8	197	Kevin Hudgens	Defensive end	Idaho State	
9	224	Kevin Starks	Tight end	Minnesota	
10	252	Tony Baker	Running back	East Carolina	
11	280	Chris Hegg	Quarterback	Truman State	
12	308	Steve Griffin	Wide receiver	Purdue	
Made roster

== Personnel ==
=== Staff ===
1986 Atlanta Falcons staff
Front office: Chairman of the board – Rankin M. Smith Sr.; President – Rankin M. Smith, Jr.; Executive vice president – Taylor Smith; Director of player personnel – Tom Braatz; Director of pro personnel – Bill Jobko; Assistant for research and development – Joe Madden; Head coaches: Head coach – Dan Henning; Offensive coaches: Running backs – Sam Elliott; Receivers – Bob Harrison; Tight ends – Bobby Jackson; Offensive line – Larry Beightol; Quality control – Steve Crosby	Defensive coaches: Defensive coordinator – Marion Campbell; Defensive line – Tommy Brasher; Linebackers – Chuck Clausen; Secondary – Fred Bruney; Special teams coaches: Special teams – Ted Fritsch; Strength and conditioning: Strength and conditioning – George Dostal

=== Roster ===
1986 Atlanta Falcons roster
Quarterbacks (QB): 10 Scott Campbell; 14 Turk Schonert; Running backs (RB): 31 William Andrews; 39 Cliff Austin; 42 Gerald Riggs; Wide receivers (WR): 82 Stacey Bailey; 89 Charlie Brown; 86 Floyd Dixon; 81 Billy "White Shoes" Johnson; 83 Aubrey Matthews; 35 Keith Williams; Tight ends (TE): 88 Arthur Cox; 87 Ron Middleton; 45 Ken Whisenhunt	Offensive linemen (OL): 73 Jamie Dukes G/C; 79 Bill Fralic G; 67 Billy Hinson G; 71 Glen Howe T; 78 Mike Kenn T; 64 Joe Pellegrini G; 55 Wayne Radloff C; 57 Jeff Van Note C; Defensive linemen (DL): 77 Rick Bryan DE; 75 Tony Casillas NT; 76 Mike Gann DE; 68 Dennis Harrison DE; 74 Mike Pitts DE; 72 Andrew Provence NT	Linebackers (LB): 52 Aaron Brown ILB; 56 Joe Costello OLB; 50 Buddy Curry ILB; 99 Tim Green ILB; 51 Reggie Wilkes OLB; 54 Joel Williams OLB; Defensive backs (DB): 26 James Britt CB; 25 Scott Case CB; 20 Wendell Cason SS; 28 Bret Clark FS; 30 David Croudip CB; 34 Robert Moore SS; 21 Jimmy Turner CB; 22 Dennis Woodberry CB; Special teams (ST): 3 Rick Donnelly P; 6 Ali Haji-Sheikh K	Reserve: 85 Anthony Allen WR (IR); 16 David Archer QB (IR); -- Dave Burnette T (NF-Inj.); 23 Bobby Butler CB (IR); 46 Herm Edwards CB (Retired); 84 Joey Jones WR (IR); 63 Jeff Kiewel G (IR); 18 Mick Luckhurst K (IR); 40 Eddie Meyers RB (Military); 62 Brett Miller T (IR); 59 John Rade LB (IR); 61 John Scully G (IR); 80 Dan Sharp TE (IR); 29 Sylvester Stamps RB (IR); Rookies in italics

== Regular season ==
=== Season summary ===
The Falcons began the 1986 season strong by winning their first four games 4–0 start, beating their NFC West rivals, the New Orleans Saints, 31–10 in the season opener. They opened at home in Atlanta with a 33–13 victory over the St. Louis Cardinals. Then, after a thrilling 37–35 win in Dallas, they beat the lowly Tampa Bay Buccaneers 23–20. The first loss came to the Philadelphia Eagles, whose strong defense coached by Buddy Ryan took care of the Falcons 16–0. Henning didn't let the loss affect his team as they beat the playoff bound Los Angeles Rams 26–14, putting the Falcons in first place with a record of 5-1. Things seemed to be going great for Atlanta, as they were able to tie the powerhouse San Francisco 49ers 10–10. Following the tie to the 49ers, a five-game slide derailed the season, starting with a 14–7 loss to the Rams, then a 25–17 loss to the defending AFC champion New England Patriots. They returned home to face the 8–1 New York Jets, where they lost 28–14 to drop them to 5–4–1. The next week a 13–10 loss to the Chicago Bears knocked them into last place in the division. Their last loss of the streak was a 20–0 loss to the 49ers. The now 5–6–1 Falcons ended their winless streak against the Miami Dolphins in a 20–14 victory. The nadir of the season came in a 28–23 loss to the Indianapolis Colts, who started the year 0–13, and was the Colts’ first win of the year. By that time, the Falcons were out of the playoff picture with Los Angeles and San Francisco already in. The Falcons dropped their last home game 14–9 to New Orleans. They concluded their season with a 20–6 victory against the Detroit Lions.

=== Schedule ===
Week	Date	Opponent	Result	Record	Venue	Attendance	Recap
1	September 7	at **New Orleans Saints**	**W** 31–10	1–0	Louisiana Superdome	67,950	Recap
2	September 14	St. Louis Cardinals	**W** 33–13	2–0	Atlanta–Fulton County Stadium	46,463	Recap
3	September 21	at Dallas Cowboys	**W** 37–35	3–0	Texas Stadium	62,880	Recap
4	September 28	at Tampa Bay Buccaneers	**W** 23–20	4–0	Tampa Stadium	38,950	Recap
5	October 5	Philadelphia Eagles	**L** 0–16	4–1	Atlanta–Fulton County Stadium	57,104	Recap
6	October 12	**Los Angeles Rams**	**W** 26–14	5–1	Atlanta–Fulton County Stadium	51,662	Recap
7	October 19	**San Francisco 49ers**	**T** 10–10 (OT)	5–1–1	Atlanta–Fulton County Stadium	55,306	Recap
8	October 26	at **Los Angeles Rams**	**L** 7–14	5–2–1	Anaheim Stadium	56,993	Recap
9	November 2	at New England Patriots	**L** 17–25	5–3–1	Sullivan Stadium	60,597	Recap
10	November 9	New York Jets	**L** 14–28	5–4–1	Atlanta–Fulton County Stadium	53,476	Recap
11	November 16	Chicago Bears	**L** 10–13	5–5–1	Atlanta–Fulton County Stadium	55,520	Recap
12	November 23	at **San Francisco 49ers**	**L** 0–20	5–6–1	Candlestick Park	58,747	Recap
13	November 30	at Miami Dolphins	**W** 20–14	6–6–1	Miami Orange Bowl	53,762	Recap
14	December 7	Indianapolis Colts	**L** 23–28	6–7–1	Atlanta–Fulton County Stadium	30,397	Recap
15	December 14	**New Orleans Saints**	**L** 9–14	6–8–1	Atlanta–Fulton County Stadium	39,994	Recap
16	December 21	at Detroit Lions	**W** 20–6	7–8–1	Pontiac Silverdome	35,255	Recap
Note: Intra-division opponents are in **bold** text.

=== Week 1 ===
Atlanta Falcons (0–0) at New Orleans Saints (0–0)

Quarter	1	2	3	4	Total
Falcons	7	7	7	10	**31**
Saints	0	3	0	7	**10**

at Louisiana Superdome, New Orleans, Louisiana

- Date: September 7
- Game weather: Indoors (dome)
- Game attendance: 67,950
- Referee: Tom Dooley
- TV announcers (CBS): Dick Stockton, Dan Dierdorf
- The Football Database

Game information

Falcons

- David Archer
  13/16, 207 Yds, 2 TD, INT
- Cliff Austin
  27 Rush, 104 Yds, TD
- Charlie Brown
  7 Rec, 119 Yds, TD

Saints

- Bobby Hebert
  13/33, 115 Yds, 2 INT
- Dalton Hilliard
  15 Rush, 51 Yds, TD
- Eugene Goodlow
  4 Rec, 58 Yds

Scoring summary

Quarter	Time	Drive			Team	Scoring information	Score	
Quarter	Time	Plays	Yards	TOP	Team	Scoring information	ATL	NO
1	10:17				Falcons	Brown 17-yard touchdown reception from Archer, Luckhurst kick good	7	0
2	7:43				Falcons	Austin 1-yard touchdown run, Luckhurst kick good	14	0
2	1:01				Saints	47-yard field goal by Andersen	14	3
3	2:21				Falcons	Riggs 1-yard touchdown run, Luckhurst kick good	21	3
4	10:12				Falcons	Anthony Allen 19-yard touchdown reception from Archer, Luckhurst kick good	28	3
4	3:30				Falcons	32-yard field goal by Luckhurst	31	3
4	0:08				Saints	Hilliard 1-yard touchdown run, Andersen kick good	10	31
"TOP" = time of possession. For other American football terms, see Glossary of American football.							31	10

=== Standings ===
NFC West
	W	L	T	PCT	DIV	CONF	PF	PA	STK
San Francisco 49ers^{(3)}	10	5	1	.656	3–2–1	6–5–1	374	247	W3
Los Angeles Rams^{(5)}	10	6	0	.625	3–3	8–4	309	267	L2
Atlanta Falcons	7	8	1	.469	2–3–1	6–5–1	280	280	W1
New Orleans Saints	7	9	0	.438	3–3	6–6	288	287	L1

== Rankings for 1986 season ==
Atlanta was 6th in scoring defense allowing 280 points, 21st in scoring offense scoring 280 points. Passing; 246 completions of 452 attempts for 3046 yards. David Archer threw for 10 of the teams 14 passing touchdowns, Turk Schonert threw the other four. Archer had nine of the teams 17 interceptions, and Schonert was picked the other eight times. The team rushed for 12 touchdowns nine of which came from Gerald Riggs, one from Schonert, one from William Andrews, one Cliff Austin.
