= Saint Joseph of the Palisades High School =

Defunct Catholic high school in Hudson County, New Jersey, United States

St. Joseph of the Palisades High School
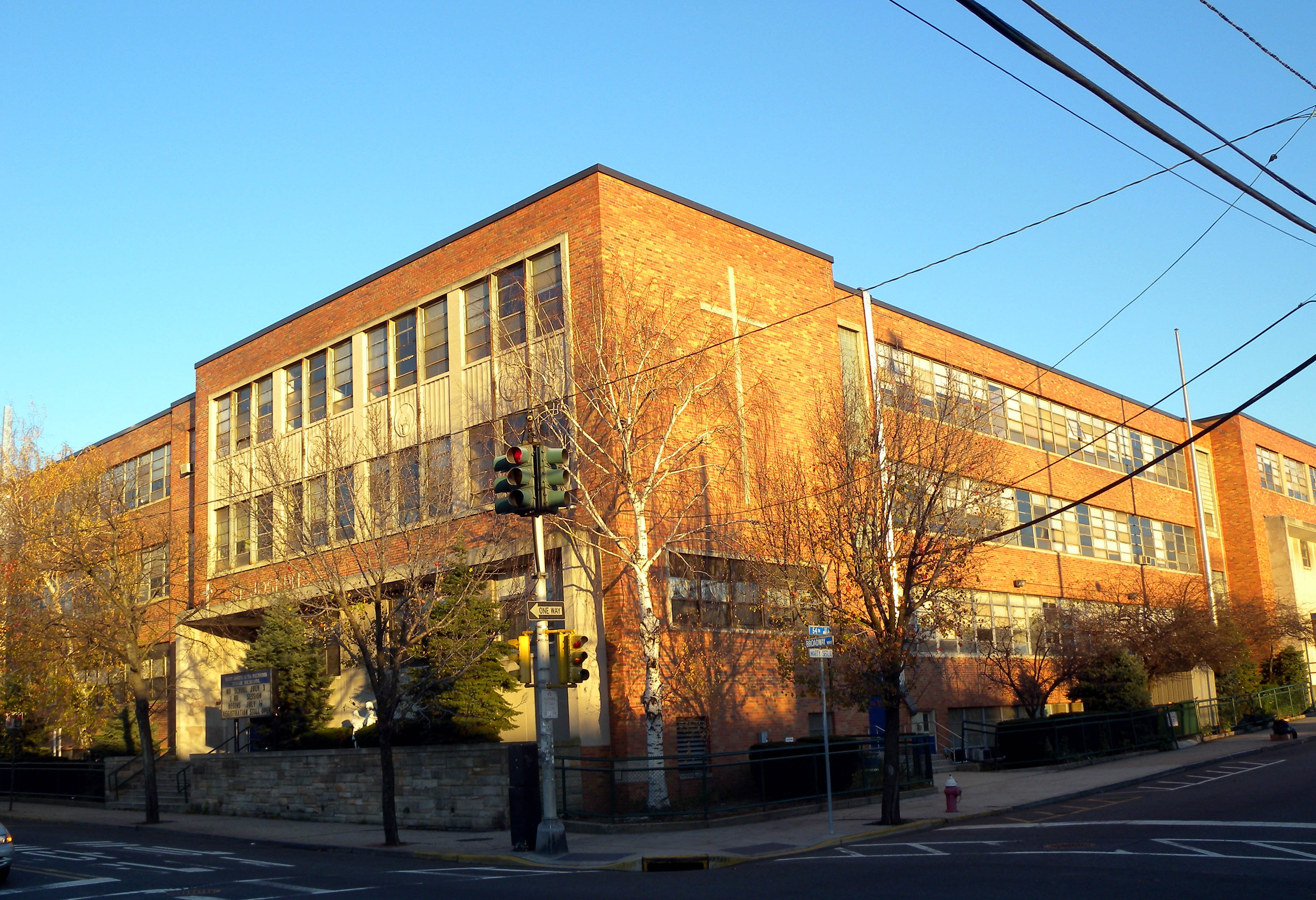

Location
- 5400 Broadway; West New York, (Hudson County), New Jersey 07093; United States
- 40°46′58″N 74°0′48″W

Information
- Type: Private, Coeducational
- Religious affiliation: Roman Catholic
- Established: 1931
- Status: Closed
- Closed: 2009
- School district: Archdiocese of Newark
- Principal: Bruce Segall
- Faculty: 19.4 (on FTE basis)
- Grades: 9–12
- Student to teacher ratio: 15.0:1
- Colors: Blue and Gold
- Athletics conference: Hudson County Interscholastic Athletic Association
- Team name: Blue Jays
- Accreditation: Middle States Association of Colleges and Schools
- Website: www.saintjoseph-wny.com (archived)

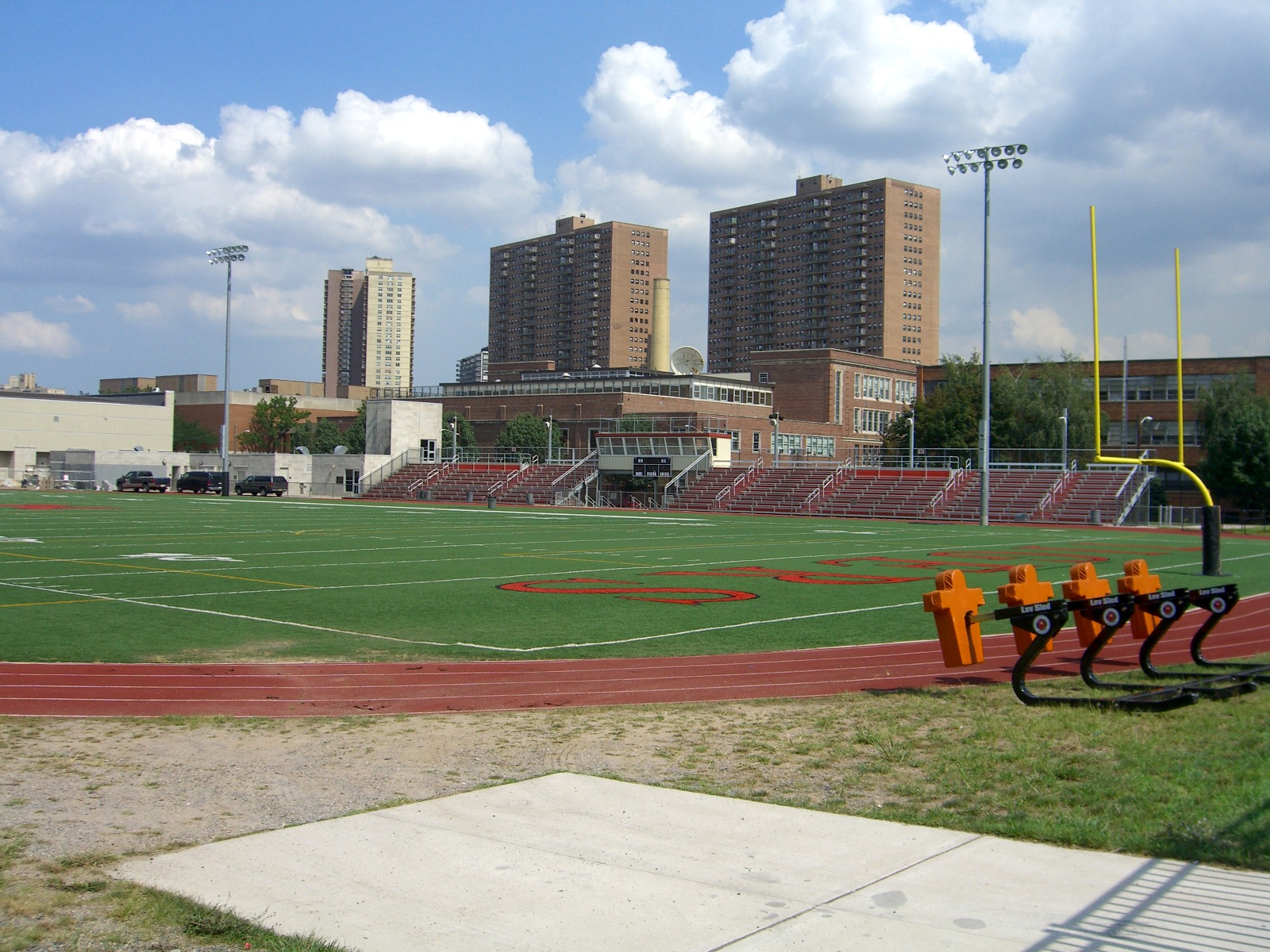
The school's athletic field

Saint Joseph of the Palisades High School was a private, Roman Catholic high school in West New York, in Hudson County, in the U.S. state of New Jersey. It operated under the auspices of the Roman Catholic Archdiocese of Newark.

As of the 2005-06 school year, the school had an enrollment of 291 students and 19.4 classroom teachers (on an FTE basis), for a student–teacher ratio of 15.0. On February 27, 2009, it was announced the school would close at the end of the 2008-09 school year due to dwindling enrollment.

== History ==
St. Joseph of the Palisades was established in 1931. The school had been accredited by the Middle States Association of Colleges and Secondary Schools since 1961. This high school was also a member of the National Honor Society and the New Jersey State Interscholastic Athletic Association. Prior to 1972, the school was divided by gender with a girls' teaching department and a boys' teaching department. Under the guidance of Father Gerald Walsh, the two departments merged to become the co-ed school located at 5400 Broadway Avenue, West New York, New Jersey.

By 2009, the student body numbered 222. The school's budget shortfall was $400,000, and the parish was in debt for $1.5 million, incurred as a result of supporting the school. Because the school required at least 275 students to remain financially solvent, final permission to close the school was granted in a February 12 letter from Archbishop of Newark John J. Myers to the Rev. Monsignor Gregory K. Studerus, pastor of St. Joseph of the Palisades Church, who informed the school's advisory board February 25. At the time, it was the latest of many Catholic schools in the county to fall on such hard times. Students and former students expressed opposition to the closure, and a protest was held to express this.

The last graduation ceremony was held on June 5, 2009; 64 seniors graduated, with six more expected to complete their coursework during that summer. Principal Bruce Segall applied to the state to start a new charter school to serve the remaining underclassmen, hoping to use the St. Joseph building, but his application was not approved. The sale of the building to the city of West New York as a means of expanding Memorial High School was one possibility mentioned.

== Athletics ==
The St. Joseph of the Palisades High School Blue Jays competed in the Hudson County Interscholastic Athletic Association, which includes public and private high schools in Hudson County. The league, now defunct, operated under the supervision of the New Jersey State Interscholastic Athletic Association.

St. Joseph of the Palisades High School offered various athletic sports to its students including:

Boys athletics

- Basketball
- Baseball
- Bowling
- Football
- Soccer
- Swimming
- Tennis

Girls athletics

- Basketball
- Bowling
- Soccer
- Softball
- Swimming
- Tennis
- Volleyball

The boys basketball team won the Non-Public Group B state championship in 1947 (against runner-up St. Mary's High School of Perth Amboy in the playoff final), 1949 (vs. Red Bank Catholic High School) and 1971 (vs. St. Rose High School). The 1947 team won the Parochial B title with a late push to defeat St. Mary's by a score of 47-43 in the championship game.

The football team was awarded the Non-Public B North state sectional championship in 1974, after the NJSIAA decided to exclude Pope John XXIII Regional High School (with an 8-1 record and having outscored opponents 293-7) and Morris Catholic High School (with a single loss on its schedule), which were thought to have schedules that were insufficiently challenging.

The girls bowling team won the overall state championship in 1979.

== Notable alumni ==
- John Brennan (born 1954), former director of the Central Intelligence Agency.
- Anthony DePalma (born 1952), author, journalist and educator who was a foreign correspondent and reporter for The New York Times.
- Louis Freeh (born 1950), former Federal Bureau of Investigation director.
- J. D. Maarleveld (born 1961), offensive tackle who played in the NFL for the Tampa Bay Buccaneers.
- Ed Murawinski (born 1951, class of 1969), cartoonist best known for his work for the New York Daily News.
