= Reggie Sutton =

American football player (born 1965)

No. 29
- Position: Cornerback

Personal information
- Born: February 15, 1965 (age 61); Miami, Florida, U.S.
- Listed height: 5 ft 10 in (1.78 m)
- Listed weight: 180 lb (82 kg)

Career information
- High school: Miami Killian (Kendall, Florida)
- College: Miami (FL)
- NFL draft: 1986: 5th round, 115th overall pick

Career history
- New Orleans Saints (1986–1988); Miami Dolphins (1990)*; Miami Hooters (1993); Las Vegas Sting (1994); Iowa Barnstormers (1995)
- * Offseason or practice squad member only

Awards and highlights
- National champion (1983)

Career NFL statistics
- Interceptions: 8
- INT yards: 100
- Fumble recoveries: 2
- Stats at Pro Football Reference
- Stats at ArenaFan.com

Reginald Eugene Sutton (born February 15, 1965) is an American former professional football player who was a cornerback in the National Football League (NFL) and Arena Football League (AFL). He was selected by the New Orleans Saints in the fifth round of the 1986 NFL draft. He played college football for the Miami Hurricanes. Sutton was also a member of the Miami Dolphins during the 1990 offseason.
