= Anthony DePalma (author) =

American journalist and reporter (born 1952)

Anthony R. DePalma (born June 16, 1952) is an American author, journalist and educator who was a foreign correspondent and reporter for The New York Times for 22 years. He continues to work on books, magazine articles and other writing projects. He is also an adjunct professor at the Columbia University Graduate School of Journalism.

== Early life and education ==
DePalma was born into a large, Italian-American family in the Hoboken, New Jersey. His father, Anthony spent his career working on the Hoboken docks. His mother, Phyllis, worked at home raising the family's six children.

DePalma graduated from Our Lady of Grace elementary school in 1966, and Saint Joseph of the Palisades High School, where he was elected president of the student council, in 1970. He graduated cum laude from Seton Hall University in 1975.

== Career ==
DePalma began his career in journalism while still in college, writing for The Jersey Journal, an Advance Publications newspaper in Jersey City, N.J., during two summers, and taking a full-year internship at New Jersey Public Television (later New Jersey Network) from 1973 to 1974. He produced the network's nightly statewide newscast. After graduation he became producer of NJPTV's nightly newscast. In 1978, he joined the Center for Analysis of Public Issues in Princeton, N.J.; he was an editor of the New Jersey Reporter magazine.

DePalma joined The New York Times in 1986, covering housing, regional politics, and higher education, before being assigned to the foreign news staff in 1993 as correspondent in Mexico City. There he covered the debate over NAFTA, the Zapatista uprising, the assassination of the ruling party presidential candidate, the 1994-95 peso crisis, and the advent of democracy in Mexico. DePalma was named bureau chief in Toronto, Canada, in 1996. In Canada, he covered natural disasters, the Quebec sovereignty movement, political issues and the creation of the Arctic territory of Nunavut.

In 2000, DePalma was named International Business Correspondent for The Times, covering North, Central and South America. His first book, Here: A Biography of the New American Continent was published in 2001 In the aftermath of the 9/11 attacks, he worked on The Times' Portraits of Grief series, writing nearly 100 of the profiles of the victims of the attacks that won the Pulitzer Prize for Public Service in 2002. In 2005, he was part of the team that produced The Times' Class Matters series. In 2004, he became an environmental reporter for The Times. In 2006, his second book, The Man Who Invented Fidel was published.

DePalma left The Times in 2008 when he was named Writer-in-Residence at Seton Hall University. In 2009, he was awarded the Maria Moors Cabot Prize for distinguished foreign reporting by Columbia University. DePalma published his third book, City of Dust in 2010, and later worked with CNN's Dr. Sanjay Gupta on the network documentary Terror in the Dust. His 2012 article "Under Suspicion" was selected as best investigative magazine article by the New Jersey chapter of the Society of Professional Journalists.

== Publications ==
DePalma is the author of three books. Here: A Biography of the New American Continent, which was published in the United States by PublicAffairs in 2001 and in Canada, where it was a national bestseller, by Harper Collins, Canada, in 2002. His next book, The Man Who Invented Fidel: Castro, Cuba and Herbert L. Matthews of The New York Times, was published by Public Affairs in 2006 and was translated into Spanish, Italian, Portuguese and Brazilian Portuguese. The film rights to "The Man" were purchased by Moxie Pictures in 2007. In 2010, FT Science, a division of Pearson PLC, published City of Dust: Illness, Arrogance and 9/11, which The Chicago Sun-Times named one of the best non-fiction books of 2010. The book was optioned by CNN and became the basis for Terror in the Dust, an hour-long documentary with Dr. Sanjay Gupta that was selected by the Society of Professional Journalists as the "Best Network Documentary" in 2011.

== Personal life ==
DePalma lives in Montclair, New Jersey with his wife Miriam Rodriguez DePalma, a public school teacher. They have three children: Aahren R. DePalma, Esq. (1981), Laura Felice R. DePalma MBA (1983), and Dr. Andres R. DePalma. (1985) They also have three grandchildren, Penelope Felice DePalma, Luca Rodriguez DePalma and Quinn Maria DePalma.
