= Jon Dumbauld =

American football player (born 1963)

No. 95, 93
- Position: Defensive end

Personal information
- Born: February 14, 1963 (age 63); Anaheim, California, U.S.
- Listed height: 6 ft 4 in (1.93 m)
- Listed weight: 259 lb (117 kg)

Career information
- High school: Troy (OH)
- College: Kentucky
- NFL draft: 1986: 10th round, 253rd overall pick

Career history
- New Orleans Saints (1986); Philadelphia Eagles (1987–1988); New Orleans Saints (1988)
- Stats at Pro Football Reference

Jon Dumbauld (born February 14, 1963) is an American former professional football defensive end. He played for the New Orleans Saints in 1986 and 1988 and the Philadelphia Eagles from 1987 to 1988. He was selected by the Saints in the tenth round of the 1986 NFL draft with the 253rd overall pick.
