= Virgil Seay =

American football player (born 1958)

No. 80, 41
- Position: Wide receiver

Personal information
- Born: January 1, 1958 (age 68); Moultrie, Georgia, U.S.
- Listed height: 5 ft 8 in (1.73 m)
- Listed weight: 175 lb (79 kg)

Career information
- High school: Moultrie (GA)
- College: Troy State
- NFL draft: 1980: 10th round, 270th overall pick

Career history
- Denver Broncos (1980)*; Washington Redskins (1981–1984); Atlanta Falcons (1984)
- * Offseason or practice squad member only

Awards and highlights
- Super Bowl champion (XVII)

Career NFL statistics
- Receptions: 43
- Receiving yards: 792
- Receiving Touchdowns: 5
- Stats at Pro Football Reference

Virgil LeVan Seay (born January 1, 1958) is an American former professional football player who was a wide receiver in the National Football League (NFL) for the Washington Redskins and the Atlanta Falcons. He played college football at Troy State University and was selected in the 10th round of the 1980 NFL draft by the Denver Broncos. The highlight of Seay's career was winning the Super Bowl with Hall of Fame coach Joe Gibbs in 1982. He is well known for being a member of the Redskins' "The Fun Bunch". Seay spent several years as an assistant varsity football and track coach at Lake Braddock Secondary School as well as coaching track at Williamsburg Middle School in Arlington, Virginia.

Since 2002, he has been the owner of Virgil Seay Sports and Activities, a sports camp for children. He is also an assistant football coach at George Mason University.

He is married to Claudia (Burroughs) Seay. They have two daughters: Meghan and Zoie.
