= Ed Murawinski =

American cartoonist

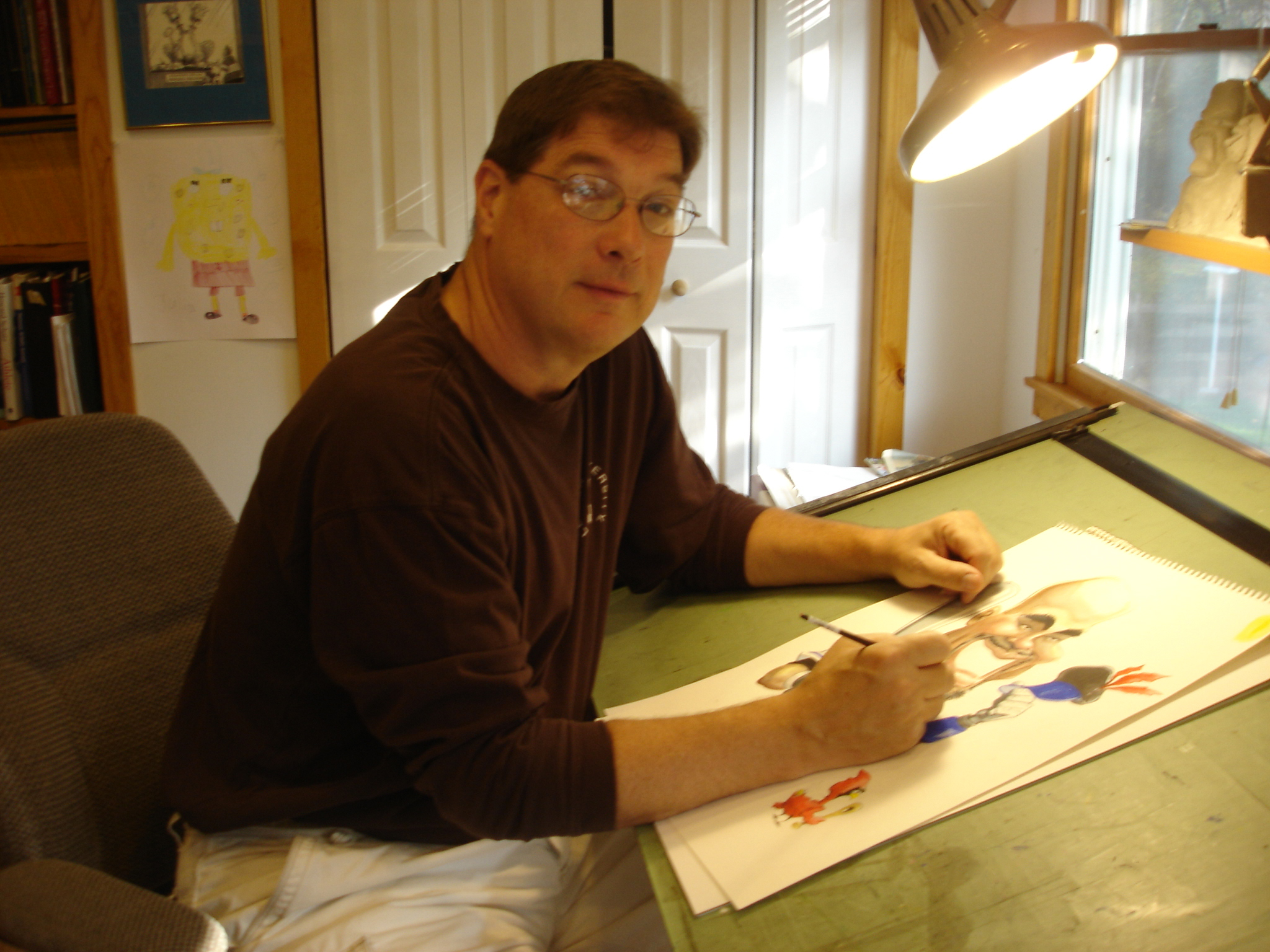
- Murawinski working on a drawing for the New York Daily News.
- Born: November 3, 1951 (age 75); Jersey City, New Jersey, U.S.
- Occupation: Cartoonist
- Spouse: Deborah Murawinski (m. 1977)
- Children: Kevin Murawinski, Michael Murawinski, Matthew Murawinski

Edward Murawinski (born November 3, 1951, in Jersey City, New Jersey) is an American cartoonist. He was formerly employed by the New York Daily News in New York City as an artist and is currently a member of the National Cartoonist Society. He attended Manhattan's School of Visual Arts and was employed by the Daily News from 1968 to 2015.

== Early life ==
Murawinski was born on November 3, 1951, in Jersey City, New Jersey to Walter A. Murawinski, a supervisor with the U.S. Postal Service, and his wife, Anna. He has two brothers, Walter and Joseph, and two sisters, Agnes and Mary, the latter of whom worked as a graphic designer. Murawinski grew up in North Bergen, New Jersey, constantly drawing and doodling from an early age, explaining, "We didn't have art classes when I went to St. Joseph of the Palisades. So I spent a lot of time just doodling on the back of notebooks and what have you." After graduating from high school in 1969, Murawinski attended the School of Visual Arts in Manhattan.

== Career ==
Around the same time, a neighborhood friend told him that the New York Daily News was looking for copy boys. The 17-year-old Murawinski got one of those positions, running copy, fetching coffee, and doing other errands for different departments.

Until September 2015, Murawinski was a cartoonist primarily for the sports department, but also illustrated certain political events such as the New York Mayoral Election. Many of the newspaper's sport section pages were laid out by Murawinski. He continues to do freelance work for the paper, such as for the 2015 World Series. The National Cartoonists Society nominated him for a Reuben Award for newspaper illustration in 2002, 2008, and 2015.

Murawinski currently does freelance work under the name Spilled Ink Studios and Sluice Box Media.

== Bibliography ==
- Hague, Jim. "He drew Steinbrenner in a diaper: NB native went from classroom doodles to Daily News sports cartoons", The Hudson Reporter, October 22, 2006, retrieved November 24, 2006.
- Ball, Ryan. "Cartoonists to Be Honored", Animation Magazine, May 21, 2003, retrieved November 24, 2006.
