= Willie Gillespie =

American football player (born 1961)

No. 23
- Position: Wide receiver

Personal information
- Born: October 24, 1961 (age 65); Starkville, Mississippi, U.S.
- Listed height: 5 ft 9 in (1.75 m)
- Listed weight: 170 lb (77 kg)

Career information
- High school: Starkville
- College: East Mississippi CC; Chattanooga

Career history
- Tampa Bay Bandits (1983–1986); Tampa Bay Buccaneers (1986); Minnesota Vikings (1987); Indianapolis Colts (1988)*
- * Offseason or practice squad member only

Career NFL statistics
- Games played: 3
- Receptions: 3
- Receiving yards: 46
- Stats at Pro Football Reference

William Earl Gillespie (born October 24, 1961) is an American former professional football player who was a running back in the National Football League (NFL). He played for the Tampa Bay Bandits in the USFL, where he had the distinction of catching the winning touchdown in the Bandits first-ever USFL game. He later played in the NFL, for both the Tampa Bay Buccaneers and the Minnesota Vikings. He went to junior college at East Mississippi Community College, and later played college football for the Chattanooga Mocs. He is the current wide-receivers coach at Starkville High School, his alma mater in 1979. He was also a member of the Indianapolis Colts.
