= Bobby Fowler (American football) =

No. 43
- Position: Fullback

Personal information
- Born: September 11, 1960 (age 66); Temple, Texas, U.S.
- Listed height: 6 ft 2 in (1.88 m)
- Listed weight: 230 lb (104 kg)

Career information
- High school: Angleton (Angleton, Texas)
- College: Louisiana Tech
- NFL draft: 1984: undrafted

Career history
- New Orleans Saints (1984–1986)
- Stats at Pro Football Reference

Bobby Lane Fowler (born September 11, 1960) is an American former professional football player who was a fullback for one season with the New Orleans Saints of the National Football League (NFL). He played college football for the UTEP Miners and Louisiana Tech Bulldogs.

== Early life and college ==
Bobby Lane Fowler was born on September 11, 1960, in Temple, Texas. He attended Angleton High School in Angleton, Texas.

Fowler first played college football for the UTEP Miners of the University of Texas at El Paso. He was a member of the team from 1978 to 1979, earning a letter during the latter season. He then transferred to play for the Louisiana Tech Bulldogs of Louisiana Tech University. Fowler was listed as ineligible in 1981 and was a two-year letterman from 1982 to 1983 at tight end.

== Professional career ==
Fowler signed with the New Orleans Saints on June 20, 1984, after going undrafted in the 1984 NFL draft. He was released on August 27, 1984. He then spent the 1984 season coaching football as a student assistant for the Louisiana Tech Bulldogs.

Fowler signed with the Saints again on May 9, 1985. Fowler was placed on injured reserve on September 2 and was later activated on October 15, 1985. He played in ten games for the Saints during the 1985 season, recording five receptions for 43 yards, two carries for four yards, and four kick returns for 78 yards. He was placed on injured reserve on August 15, 1986, and missed the entire 1986 season. Fowler was released by New Orleans on July 27, 1987, after failing a physical.
