= Vito McKeever =

American football player (born 1961)

No. 21
- Position: Defensive back

Personal information
- Born: October 8, 1961 (age 65); Inverness, Florida
- Listed height: 6 ft 0 in (1.83 m)
- Listed weight: 180 lb (82 kg)

Career information
- High school: Dunnellon (FL)
- College: Florida

Career history
- Michigan Panthers (1984); Oakland Invaders (1985); Tampa Bay Buccaneers (1986–1987)
- Stats at Pro Football Reference

Vito McKeever (born October 8, 1961) is an American former football defensive back. He played for the Tampa Bay Buccaneers from 1986 to 1987.
