= The Fun Bunch =

1980s Washington Redskins receiving group

The Fun Bunch were the wide receivers and tight ends of the Washington Redskins of the National Football League (NFL) during the early 1980s.

== History ==
The Fun Bunch celebrating in the end zone after a touchdown in Super Bowl XVII.

Known for their choreographed group celebrations in the end zone (usually a group high-five) following a touchdown, the Fun Bunch's actions eventually resulted in a league-wide ban of "excessive celebration" in 1984.

The members of the Fun Bunch included the Redskins' wide receivers Art Monk, Virgil Seay, Charlie Brown, and Alvin Garrett, running back Otis Wonsley and tight ends Rick Walker and Don Warren. Each won a Super Bowl with the Redskins (Monk and Warren were on all three Super Bowl champion Redskin teams), and three were chosen for the Pro Bowl. Art Monk was inducted into the Pro Football Hall of Fame.

The first high-five leap performed by the Fun Bunch occurred after an Alvin Garrett touchdown in a 1982 first round playoff game against the Detroit Lions. It was done originally for Monk who was injured in the regular season finale and didn't play in the postseason.

During a 1983 game against the archrival Dallas Cowboys, defensive backs Michael Downs and Dennis Thurman stepped into the middle of a celebration by the Fun Bunch following a Monk touchdown, sparking a brief skirmish. Offsetting unsportsmanlike conduct penalties were called against Downs and Brown.

In the Fun Bunch, there was a sub-group nicknamed the Smurfs. The Smurfs consisted of Virgil Seay, Alvin Garrett, and Charlie Brown. The three were given the nickname because of their diminutive size (Garrett was 5'7", Seay known as Papa Smurf was 5'8", and Brown the tallest at 5'10"), comparing them to the tiny blue comic and cartoon characters in The Smurfs.

== See also ==
- List of NFL nicknames
