= Leon Pennington =

American football player (born 1963)

No. 59
- Position: Linebacker

Personal information
- Born: December 25, 1963 (age 62); United States
- Listed height: 6 ft 1 in (1.85 m)
- Listed weight: 225 lb (102 kg)

Career information
- High school: Oakland Park
- College: Florida
- NFL draft: 1986: undrafted

Career history
- Tampa Bay Bandits (1986); Tampa Bay Buccaneers (1987)
- Stats at Pro Football Reference

Leon Tyrone Pennington (born December 25, 1963) is an American former professional football player who was a linebacker for three games with the Tampa Bay Buccaneers of the National Football League in 1987. He played college football for the Florida Gators.
