= Keith Williams (running back) =

American football player (born 1964)

No. 35
- Positions: Running back, wide receiver

Personal information
- Born: September 30, 1964 (age 62); St. Louis, Missouri, U.S.
- Listed height: 5 ft 10 in (1.78 m)
- Listed weight: 173 lb (78 kg)

Career information
- High school: Sumner (St. Louis)
- College: Southwest Missouri State (1982–1985)
- NFL draft: 1986: 6th round, 159th overall pick

Career history
- Atlanta Falcons (1986); Tampa Bay Buccaneers (1987–1988)*; Tampa Bay Buccaneers (1990)*
- * Offseason or practice squad member only

Awards and highlights
- First-team All-Gateway (1985)

Career NFL statistics
- Games played: 12
- Receptions: 12
- Receiving yards: 164
- Receiving touchdowns: 1
- Rushing yards: 18
- Return yards: 255
- Stats at Pro Football Reference

Keith Williams (born September 30, 1964) is an American former professional football running back and wide receiver who played in the National Football League (NFL) with the Atlanta Falcons and Tampa Bay Buccaneers. He played college football for the Southwest Missouri State Bears.

== Early life ==
Williams was born on September 30, 1964, in St. Louis, Missouri. He attended Sumner High School in St. Louis.

== College career ==
Williams played college football at Southwest Missouri State Bears from 1982 to 1985. He was a four-year letterman and started in 31 of the 39 games he played. Williams rushed for 2,694 yards, recorded 982 receiving yards and 500 kickoff return yards. In 1984, he earned an I-AA All-American honorable mention nod by the AP. In 1985, Williams was named to the first-team All-Gateway team.

== Professional career ==
=== Atlanta Falcons ===
Williams was selected in the sixth round, with the 159th overall selection, by the Atlanta Falcons in the 1986 NFL draft. He was used mostly as a receiver and kickoff returner, recording 12 receptions for 164 yards, one touchdown and 255 return yards in 12 games. In addition, Williams rushed three times for 18 yards.

=== Tampa Bay Buccaneers ===
On August 13, 1987, Williams was acquired by the Tampa Bay Buccaneers in exchange for a conditional seventh-round pick in the 1988 NFL draft from the Falcons. On August 25, he was put on the injured reserve. In the 1988 season, Williams was placed on the reserve/did not report list. On March 2, 1990, he returned to the team but was released on May 21.
