= J. D. Maarleveld =

American football player (born 1961)

J.D. Maarleveld
No. 77
- Position: Offensive tackle

Personal information
- Born: October 24, 1961 (age 65); Jersey City, New Jersey, U.S.
- Listed height: 6 ft 6 in (1.98 m)
- Listed weight: 300 lb (136 kg)

Career information
- High school: St. Joseph of the Palisades (West New York, New Jersey)
- College: Notre Dame; Maryland
- NFL draft: 1986: 5th round, 112th overall pick

Career history
- Tampa Bay Buccaneers (1986–1987); Houston Oilers (1989)*
- * Offseason or practice squad member only

Awards and highlights
- ACC Brian Piccolo Award (1984); Consensus All-American (1985); First-team All-ACC (1985)

Career NFL statistics
- Games played: 25
- Games started: 3
- Stats at Pro Football Reference

John David "J. D." Maarleveld (born October 24, 1961) is an American former professional football player who was an offensive tackle for the Tampa Bay Buccaneers of the National Football League (NFL). He played college football for the Maryland Terrapins after transferring from the Notre Dame Fighting Irish, following his survival after a bout with cancer. He was selected by the Buccaneers in the fifth round of the 1986 NFL draft.

== College career ==
A native of Jersey City, Maarleveld enrolled at the University of Notre Dame after graduating from Saint Joseph of the Palisades High School and played football as an offensive tackle. Shortly after his sophomore year in 1982, he was diagnosed with Hodgkin's lymphoma, one of the more curable types of cancer when discovered in its early stages. Notre Dame head coach Gerry Faust assured him that he had a position on the team after he recovered. Maarleveld forced himself to eat and maintained a vigorous workout routine throughout the duration of his chemotherapy, and he lost only 35 pounds as a result.

A year later, doctors assessed that he was free of cancer. However, Faust informed his parents that there was no longer a place for him on the Notre Dame team and was unsure whether he was still in football condition. Faust recommended that Maarleveld transfer to a Division II school.

He instead transferred to Maryland to play under head coach Bobby Ross and offensive line coach Ralph Friedgen. In 1984, he was the recipient of the Brian Piccolo Award, the Atlantic Coast Conference (ACC) award for overcoming adversity. In 1985, he was named a consensus first-team All-American.

== Professional career ==
Maarleveld entered the 1986 NFL draft and expected himself to be a first-round pick. Instead, he was selected in the fifth round (119th overall) by the Tampa Bay Buccaneers. He expressed the belief that his placement in the draft was due to his earlier battle with cancer.

Maarleveld played for the Buccaneers for two years. In 1986, he played in 14 games and, in 1987, he played in 11 games including three starts. In 1988, the Buccaneers waived his contract before the start of the season.

== Later life ==
Maarleveld was inducted into the University of Maryland Athletic Hall of Fame in 2004. His nephew, Andrew Gonnella, also attended Maryland as a walk-on offensive lineman. His son Max is a pitcher at Montclair State University.
