= Kevin Walker (cornerback) =

American football player (born 1963)

No. 37, 27
- Positions: Cornerback, safety

Personal information
- Born: October 20, 1963 (age 63); Greensboro, North Carolina, U.S.
- Listed height: 5 ft 11 in (1.80 m)
- Listed weight: 180 lb (82 kg)

Career information
- High school: Ben L. Smith (Greensboro, North Carolina)
- College: East Carolina
- NFL draft: 1986: 6th round, 165th overall pick

Career history
- Tampa Bay Buccaneers (1986–1987); Detroit Lions (1988)*
- * Offseason or practice squad member only

Career NFL statistics
- Interceptions: 2
- Fumble recoveries: 1
- Touchdowns: 1
- Stats at Pro Football Reference

Kevin Cornelius Walker (born October 20, 1963) who went to Ben L. Smith High School in Greensboro, North Carolina was an All American defensive back for East Carolina University and the Tampa Bay Buccaneers of the National Football League (NFL).

While Walker was a playing for the East Carolina Pirates, he was the university's Most Valuable Defensive Player in 1985. He led the nation with nine interceptions in the 1985 college football season.

Walker was Second-team All South Independent in 1984 and was First-team All South Independent in 1985. He led East Carolina University in most interceptions for three seasons. He recorded five interceptions in 1983, four interceptions in 1984 and nine interceptions in 1985.

In 1986, the Tampa Bay Buccaneers drafted Walker in the sixth round with 165th overall pick. He played for two seasons with the Buccaneers.
