= Harold Ricks =

American football player (born 1962)

No. 45
- Position: Running back

Personal information
- Born: December 26, 1962 (age 63); United States
- Listed height: 5 ft 10 in (1.78 m)
- Listed weight: 200 lb (91 kg)

Career information
- High school: Plant
- College: Chattanooga
- NFL draft: 1984: undrafted

Career history
- Portland Breakers (1985); Tampa Bay Buccaneers (1987)
- Stats at Pro Football Reference

Harold J. Ricks (born December 26, 1962) is an American former professional football player who was a running back for the Tampa Bay Buccaneers of the National Football League (NFL). He played college football for the Chattanooga Mocs.
