= Eugene Goodlow =

American gridiron football player (born 1958)

No. 34, 88, 82
- Position: Wide receiver

Personal information
- Born: December 19, 1958 (age 67); St. Louis, Missouri, U.S.
- Listed height: 6 ft 2 in (1.88 m)
- Listed weight: 185 lb (84 kg)

Career information
- High school: McQuaid Jesuit (Rochester, New York)
- College: Kansas State
- NFL draft: 1982: 3rd round, 66th overall pick

Career history
- Winnipeg Blue Bombers (1980–1982); New Orleans Saints (1983–1986); San Diego Chargers (1988)*; Ottawa Rough Riders (1989)
- * Offseason or practice squad member only

Awards and highlights
- CFL Western All-Star (1981); Second-team All-Big Eight (1978)

Career NFL statistics
- Receptions: 115
- Receiving yards: 1,677
- Touchdowns: 10
- Stats at Pro Football Reference

Eugene Goodlow (born December 19, 1958) is an American former professional football player who was a wide receiver for four seasons in the National Football League (NFL). In 1981 and 1982 he played for the Winnipeg Blue Bombers of the Canadian Football League (CFL), where he led the league in receptions and was an All-Star in 1981. Goodlow became the first player in CFL history to reach 100 receptions in a season during the 1981 season. In 1982, he signed a seven-year, $1.6 million contract with the New Orleans Saints. He then joined the San Diego Chargers in 1987.
