= Nathan Wonsley =

American football player (born 1963)

No. 46
- Position: Running back

Personal information
- Born: December 7, 1963 (age 62); Moss Point, Mississippi, U.S.
- Listed height: 5 ft 10 in (1.78 m)
- Listed weight: 190 lb (86 kg)

Career information
- High school: Moss Point
- College: Mississippi
- NFL draft: 1986: undrafted

Career history
- Tampa Bay Buccaneers (1986)

Career NFL statistics
- Rushing yards: 339
- Average: 4.6
- Touchdowns: 3
- Stats at Pro Football Reference

Nathan Wonsley Jr. (born December 7, 1963) is an American former professional football player who was a running back for the Tampa Bay Buccaneers of the National Football League (NFL). He played college football at Ole Miss Rebels. He was signed by the Buccaneers as an undrafted free agent in 1986. After his football career, he became a bodybuilder.

Wonsley has two brothers, Otis Wonsley and George Wonsley, who were also running backs in the NFL.
