= Paul Tripoli =

American football player (born 1961)

No. 28, 24
- Position: Safety

Personal information
- Born: December 14, 1961 (age 64); Utica, New York, U.S.
- Listed height: 6 ft 0 in (1.83 m)
- Listed weight: 197 lb (89 kg)

Career information
- High school: Liverpool (NY)
- College: Alabama
- NFL draft: 1985: undrafted

Career history
- Cleveland Browns (1985)*; Toronto Argonauts (1986–1987); Tampa Bay Buccaneers (1987)
- * Offseason or practice squad member only

Career NFL statistics
- Interceptions: 3
- Fumble recoveries: 3
- Touchdowns: 1
- Stats at Pro Football Reference

Paul Randall Tripoli (born December 14, 1961) is an American former professional football player who was a defensive back in the National Football League (NFL) and Canadian Football League (CFL). He played college football for the Alabama Crimson Tide. He played in the NFL for the Tampa Bay Buccaneers in 1987.
