= Bobby Futrell =

American football player (1962–1992)

No. 36
- Position: CB

Personal information
- Born: August 4, 1962; Ahoskie, North Carolina, U.S.
- Died: May 31, 1992 (aged 29); Tampa, Florida, U.S.

Career information
- High school: Ahoskie (NC)
- College: Elizabeth City State

Career history
- Tampa Bay Buccaneers (1986–1990)

Career statistics
- Interceptions: 4
- Tackles: 134
- Passes Defensed: 19
- Stats at Pro Football Reference

Bobby Futrell (August 4, 1962 – June 1, 1992) was an American professional football player who was a cornerback for five seasons for the Tampa Bay Buccaneers. Futrell recorded 4 career interceptions, 19 passes defensed, and 134 career tackles in his time with the Buccaneers. He also played in the USFL for three teams. In 1992 Futrell was found hanged in his Tampa garage shortly after an argument with his wife over their son's school.
