= Otis Wonsley =

American football player (born 1957)

No. 39
- Position: Running back

Personal information
- Born: August 13, 1957 (age 69); Pascagoula, Mississippi, U.S.
- Listed height: 5 ft 10 in (1.78 m)
- Listed weight: 214 lb (97 kg)

Career information
- High school: Moss Point (Moss Point, Mississippi)
- College: Alcorn State
- NFL draft: 1980: 9th round, 229 (by the New York Giants)th overall pick

Career history
- New York Giants (1980)*; Washington Redskins (1981–1985)
- * Offseason or practice squad member only

Awards and highlights
- Super Bowl champion (XVII)

Career NFL statistics
- Rushing yards: 181
- Rushing average: 3
- Rushing touchdowns: 5
- Stats at Pro Football Reference

Otis Wonsley (born August 13, 1957) is an American former professional football player who was a running back for the Washington Redskins of the National Football League (NFL). He played college football for the Alcorn State Braves and was selected in the ninth round of the 1980 NFL draft.

== Early life ==
Wonsley was born in Pascagoula, Mississippi, and played high school football at Moss Point High School in Moss Point, Mississippi.

== College career ==
Wonsley attended and played college football at Alcorn State University in Lorman, Mississippi. During his career at Alcorn State, he rushed for over 1,500 yards.

== Professional career ==
Wonsley was drafted in the ninth round (229th overall) of the 1980 NFL draft by the New York Giants, but was cut by the Giants after training camp. He was then signed by the Washington Redskins in April 1981, where he spent his entire playing career and was used primarily as a backup to John Riggins. He was also a member of The Fun Bunch, which was a group of Redskins players known for their choreographed group celebrations in the end zone (usually a group high-five) following a touchdown. The Fun Bunch's actions eventually resulted in a league-wide ban of "excessive celebration" in 1984.

Wonsley was a member of the Redskins Super Bowl XVII-winning team and played a vital role in what would be the game-winning play. With 10 minutes remaining, the Redskins faced fourth and inches. They decided to go for it calling, "70 chip," a run play designed for Riggins in short-yardage situations. Riggins took the handoff from Joe Theismann and followed Wonsley and tight end Clint Didier through the left side. Riggins then broke an attempted tackle by Dolphin cornerback Don McNeal and ran for a 43-yard touchdown. The Super Bowl win was the Redskins' first championship victory since 1942. On December 6, 2007, Riggins' run was voted by fans as the Redskins' Greatest Moment.

== Personal life ==
Wonsley has two brothers, Nathan and George Wonsley, who were also running backs in the NFL. He is the stepfather of NBA player Roger Mason, Jr.
