= George Wonsley =

American football player (born 1960)

No. 34, 35
- Position: Running back

Personal information
- Born: November 23, 1960 (age 65); Moss Point, Mississippi, U.S.
- Listed height: 5 ft 10 in (1.78 m)
- Listed weight: 218 lb (99 kg)

Career information
- High school: Moss Point
- College: Mississippi State
- NFL draft: 1984: 4th round, 103rd overall pick

Career history
- Indianapolis Colts (1984–1988); New England Patriots (1989)

Career NFL statistics
- Rushing yards: 1,158
- Average: 4.1
- Touchdowns: 9
- Stats at Pro Football Reference

George Ivory Wonsley (born November 23, 1960) is an American former professional football player who was a running back in the National Football League (NFL). He played college football for the Mississippi State Bulldogs and was selected 103rd overall by the Indianapolis Colts in the fourth round of the 1984 NFL draft.

Wonsley has two brothers, Otis Wonsley and Nathan, who were also running backs in the NFL.
