= Cliff Austin =

American football player (born 1960)

No. 47, 39
- Position: Running back

Personal information
- Born: March 2, 1960 (age 66); Atlanta, Georgia, U.S.
- Listed height: 6 ft 0 in (1.83 m)
- Listed weight: 203 lb (92 kg)

Career information
- High school: Avondale (Avondale Estates, Georgia)
- College: Clemson
- NFL draft: 1983: 3rd round, 66th overall pick

Career history
- New Orleans Saints (1983); Atlanta Falcons (1984–1986); Tampa Bay Buccaneers (1987)

Awards and highlights
- National champion (1981); First-team All-ACC (1982)

Career NFL statistics
- Games played: 58
- Rushing yards: 445
- Touchdowns: 2
- Stats at Pro Football Reference

Clifford Austin (born March 2, 1960) is an American former professional football player who was a running back for five seasons in the National Football League (NFL) with the New Orleans Saints, Atlanta Falcons, and Tampa Bay Buccaneers. He played college football for the Clemson Tigers, where he was a running back on the 1981 national championship team and was selected 66th overall in the third round of the 1983 NFL draft. Austin played in 58 career NFL games, starting three.
