= 1986 NFL season =

American football season

Regular season
- Duration: September 7 – December 22, 1986

Playoffs
- Start date: December 28, 1986
- AFC Champions: Denver Broncos
- NFC Champions: New York Giants

Super Bowl XXI
- Date: January 25, 1987
- Site: Rose Bowl, Pasadena, California
- Champions: New York Giants

Pro Bowl
- Date: February 1, 1987
- Site: Aloha Stadium

AFC teams: West, Central, East
NFC teams: West, Central, East

The 1986 NFL season was the 67th regular season of the National Football League. Defending Super Bowl Champion Chicago Bears shared the league's best record with the New York Giants at 14–2, with the Giants claiming the first seed in the NFC by a tiebreaker of better conference record. At 12-4, the Cleveland Browns secured the first seed in the AFC. The season ended with Super Bowl XXI when the New York Giants defeated the Denver Broncos 39–20 at the Rose Bowl in Pasadena, California to win their first league title in 30 years.

== Player movement ==
=== Transactions ===
- August 11, 1986, The New England Patriots trade the rights to Ricky Sanders to the Washington Redskins.
- November 8, 1986: Steve Tasker was claimed off waivers by the Buffalo Bills.

=== Trades ===
- October 14, 1986: The Chicago Bears acquired quarterback Doug Flutie in a trade with the Los Angeles Rams.

=== Draft ===
The 1986 NFL draft was held from April 29 to 30, 1986, at New York City's Marriott Marquis. With the first pick, the Tampa Bay Buccaneers selected runningback Bo Jackson from Auburn University.

== New referee ==
Dick Hantak was promoted to referee after serving eight seasons as a back judge (the position title was changed to field judge in 1998). Fred Silva was then assigned as a swing official instead of his own crew after suffering a heart attack in the offseason. Chuck Heberling was scheduled to be an instant replay official but was asked to remain on the field following Silva's heart attack. Herberling earned assignment to the AFC championship.

== Major rule changes ==
- Players are prohibited from wearing apparel, equipment, or other items that carry commercial names, names of organizations, or any type of personal message unless they get specific permission from the league.
- If the offensive team commits a dead ball foul during the last two minutes of a half, the clock will start at the snap.
- If an offensive player fumbles the ball and it goes forward and out of bounds, the ball is returned to that team at the spot of the fumble.
- If an offensive player fumbles the ball in the field of play and it goes out of bounds in the opponent's end zone, the ball is given to the defensive team at the spot of the fumble (this rule would be changed in 1991 to result in a touchback).
- A limited system of instant replay was adopted to aid officiating. A replay official in a booth would decide what plays to review and make the final ruling, regardless of the current score or the amount of time left in the game. The replay official communicated with the game officials via radio transmitters. However, there was no time limit on how long the replay official could review a play and this led to long game delays (this was a major reason why the system was eventually repealed in 1992 and not brought back until a more comprehensive replay system with time limits were established in 1999).

=== Deaths ===
- Fritz Pollard, former running back for the Akron Pros and one of the first black players to play professional football in the NFL, died from pneumonia at the age of 92.

=== American Bowl ===
A series of National Football League pre-season exhibition games that were held at sites outside the United States, the only American Bowl game in 1986 was held at London's Wembley Stadium.

Date	Winning team	Score	Losing team	Score	Stadium	City
August 3, 1986	Chicago Bears	17	Dallas Cowboys	6	Wembley Stadium	(United Kingdom) London

== Regular season ==
=== Scheduling formula ===
Inter-conference
AFC East vs NFC West
AFC Central vs NFC Central
AFC West vs NFC East

Highlights of the 1986 season included:

- Thanksgiving: Two games were played on Thursday, November 27, featuring Green Bay at Detroit and Seattle at Dallas, with Green Bay and Seattle winning.

=== Final standings ===
AFC East
	W	L	T	PCT	DIV	CONF	PF	PA	STK
^{(3)} New England Patriots	11	5	0	.688	7–1	8–4	412	307	W1
^{(4)} New York Jets	10	6	0	.625	6–2	8–4	364	386	L5
Miami Dolphins	8	8	0	.500	5–3	6–6	430	405	L1
Buffalo Bills	4	12	0	.250	1–7	3–11	287	348	L3
Indianapolis Colts	3	13	0	.188	1–7	2–10	229	400	W3

AFC Central
	W	L	T	PCT	DIV	CONF	PF	PA	STK
^{(1)} Cleveland Browns	12	4	0	.750	5–1	10–2	391	310	W5
Cincinnati Bengals	10	6	0	.625	3–3	7–5	409	394	W1
Pittsburgh Steelers	6	10	0	.375	3–3	4–8	307	336	L1
Houston Oilers	5	11	0	.313	1–5	3–9	274	329	W2

AFC West
	W	L	T	PCT	DIV	CONF	PF	PA	STK
^{(2)} Denver Broncos	11	5	0	.688	5–3	8–4	378	327	L1
^{(5)} Kansas City Chiefs	10	6	0	.625	5–3	9–5	358	326	W3
Seattle Seahawks	10	6	0	.625	5–3	7–5	366	293	W5
Los Angeles Raiders	8	8	0	.500	4–4	7–5	323	346	L4
San Diego Chargers	4	12	0	.250	1–7	4–8	335	396	L2

NFC East
	W	L	T	PCT	DIV	CONF	PF	PA	STK
^{(1)} New York Giants	14	2	0	.875	7–1	11–1	371	236	W9
^{(4)} Washington Redskins	12	4	0	.750	5–3	9–3	368	296	W1
Dallas Cowboys	7	9	0	.438	5–3	6–6	346	337	L5
Philadelphia Eagles	5	10	1	.344	1–6–1	3–8–1	256	312	L1
St. Louis Cardinals	4	11	1	.281	1–6–1	3–10–1	218	351	W1

NFC Central
	W	L	T	PCT	DIV	CONF	PF	PA	STK
^{(2)} Chicago Bears	14	2	0	.875	7–1	10–2	352	187	W7
Minnesota Vikings	9	7	0	.563	6–2	8–4	398	273	W1
Detroit Lions	5	11	0	.313	3–5	4–8	277	326	L4
Green Bay Packers	4	12	0	.250	3–5	3–9	254	418	L1
Tampa Bay Buccaneers	2	14	0	.125	1–7	1–13	239	473	L7

NFC West
	W	L	T	PCT	DIV	CONF	PF	PA	STK
^{(3)} San Francisco 49ers	10	5	1	.656	3–2–1	6–5–1	374	247	W3
^{(5)} Los Angeles Rams	10	6	0	.625	3–3	8–4	309	267	L2
Atlanta Falcons	7	8	1	.469	2–3–1	6–5–1	280	280	W1
New Orleans Saints	7	9	0	.438	3–3	6–6	288	287	L1

=== Tiebreakers ===
- Denver was second AFC playoff seed ahead of New England based on head-to-head victory (1–0).
- N.Y. Jets were the first AFC Wild Card based on better conference record (8–4) than Kansas City (9–5), Seattle (7–5), and Cincinnati (7–5).
- Kansas City was the second AFC Wild Card based on better conference record (9–5) than Seattle (7–5) and Cincinnati (7–5).
- N.Y. Giants were the top NFC playoff seed based on better conference record than Chicago (11–1 to Bears' 10–2).

== Playoffs ==
Note: The New York Giants (the NFC one seed) did not play the Washington Redskins (the four seed) in the Divisional playoff round because both teams were in the same division.

Jan 4 – Mile High Stadium
3	New England	17
Dec 28 – Giants Stadium	Jan 11 – Cleveland Stadium
2	Denver	22
AFC
5	Kansas City	15	2	Denver	23*
Jan 3 – Cleveland Stadium
4	NY Jets	35	1	Cleveland	20
AFC Championship
4	NY Jets	20
Jan 25 – Rose Bowl
1	Cleveland	23**
Divisional round
Wild-card round	A2	Denver	20
Jan 3 – Soldier Field
N1	NY Giants	39
Super Bowl XXI
4	Washington	27
Dec 28 – RFK Memorial Stadium	Jan 11 – Giants Stadium
2	Chicago	13
NFC
5	LA Rams	7	4	Washington	0
Jan 4 – Giants Stadium
4	Washington	19	1	NY Giants	17
NFC Championship
3	San Francisco	3
1	NY Giants	49

* Indicates OT victory
** Indicates 2OT victory

== Milestones ==
The following players set all-time records during the season:

Most passes completed, season	Dan Marino, Miami (378)
Most pass attempts, season	Dan Marino, Miami (623)

== Statistical leaders ==
=== Team ===
Points scored	Miami Dolphins (430)
Total yards gained	Cincinnati Bengals (6,490)
Yards rushing	Chicago Bears (2,700)
Yards passing	Miami Dolphins (4,779)
Fewest points allowed	Chicago Bears (187)
Fewest total yards allowed	Chicago Bears (4,130)
Fewest rushing yards allowed	New York Giants (1,284)
Fewest passing yards allowed	St. Louis Cardinals (2,637)

== Awards ==
Most Valuable Player	Lawrence Taylor, linebacker, New York Giants
Coach of the Year	Bill Parcells, New York Giants
Offensive Player of the Year	Eric Dickerson, running back, Los Angeles Rams
Defensive Player of the Year	Lawrence Taylor, linebacker, New York Giants
Offensive Rookie of the Year	Rueben Mayes, running back, New Orleans Saints
Defensive Rookie of the Year	Leslie O'Neal, defensive end, San Diego Chargers
NFL Comeback Player of the Year	Joe Montana, quarterback, San Francisco 49ers, Tommy Kramer, quarterback, Minnesota Vikings (co-winners)
Man of the Year	Reggie Williams, linebacker, Cincinnati Bengals
Super Bowl Most Valuable Player	Phil Simms, quarterback, New York Giants

== Coaching changes ==
=== Offseason ===
- Houston Oilers: Jerry Glanville began his first full season as head coach after taking over for Hugh Campbell, who was fired after 14 games in 1985.
- Minnesota Vikings: Bud Grant stepped down and was replaced by his long time offensive coordinator Jerry Burns, who became a professional head coach for the first time, and a head coach at any level for the first time since coaching the Iowa Hawkeyes from 1961 to 1965.
- New Orleans Saints: Jim Mora, who went 48–13–1 as coach of the Philadelphia/Baltimore Stars of the United States Football League, became the new Saints head coach. Bum Phillips resigned after 12 games in 1985. Wade Phillips, his son and the team's defensive coordinator, served as interim for the last four games.
- Philadelphia Eagles: Chicago Bears defensive coordinator Buddy Ryan was hired as the Eagles' new head coach. Marion Campbell was fired before the final game of the 1985 season; Fred Bruney as interim for that last game.
- St. Louis Cardinals: Jim Hanifan was fired and replaced by Gene Stallings, a Dallas Cowboys assistant from 1972 to 1985, and head coach of the Texas A&M Aggies from 1965 to 1971.

=== In-season ===
- Buffalo Bills: Hank Bullough was fired after 9 games into the season. Marv Levy was named as Bullough's replacement. Levy, the former head coach of the Kansas City Chiefs (1978–1982) and the USFL's Chicago Blitz (1984), was out of coaching since his stint with the Blitz when the Bills hired him. Levy went on to lead the Bills through 1997, with four consecutive Super Bowl appearances from 1990 to 1993.
- Indianapolis Colts: Rod Dowhower was fired after the Colts lost their first 13 games. Former SMU and New England Patriots coach Ron Meyer was named as replacement, and promptly led the team to three straight victories to finish 3–13. He coached the Colts until he was fired midway through the 1991 season.
- San Diego Chargers: Don Coryell left after a 1–7 start. Al Saunders finished out the season and remained in the position through 1988.

== Uniform changes ==
- The Buffalo Bills began wearing their white pants with their white jerseys, discontinuing their blue pants. This was the first time the Bills wore white pants with their white jerseys since 1972.
- The New Orleans Saints wore gold pants for the first time since 1974, discontinuing both their black and white pants. A secondary logo featuring a fleur-de-lis inside an outline of the state of Louisiana was added to both the jersey sleeves and the sides of the pants. The Saints retained this look through 1995.
- The numbers on the San Diego Chargers' blue jerseys changed from gold to white.
- The New York Giants added a "Spider 43" patch to their jerseys in memory of former Giants safety Carl "Spider" Lockhart following Lockhart's death from lymphoma on July 9, 1986. The Giants would also add a "38" decal to the back of their helmets in memory of former Giants running back John Tuggle following Tuggle's death on August 30, 1986, from angiosarcoma.
- The Miami Dolphins slightly reversed the stripe order on their pants, changing from having aqua in between orange stripes to orange in between aqua stripes.

== Television ==
This was the fifth and final year under the league's broadcast contracts with ABC, CBS, and NBC to televise Monday Night Football, the NFC package, and the AFC package, respectively. This was the last season that games remained only on broadcast television, as the league would sign a deal with the cable channel ESPN to broadcast a series of Sunday night games starting in 1987.

ABC opted to go to a two-man booth, dropping Joe Namath and O. J. Simpson, moving Frank Gifford to its sole color commentator, and having Al Michaels serve as the new play-by-announcer. Gifford would once again call the play-by-play during those weeks when Michaels was busy calling the Major League Baseball playoffs, and Lynn Swann or Simpson would fill-in.
