= 1983 Tampa Bay Buccaneers season =

NFL team season

- Owner: Hugh Culverhouse
- Head coach: John McKay
- Home stadium: Tampa Stadium

Results
- Record: 2–14
- Division place: 5th NFC Central
- Playoffs: Did not qualify
- All-Pros: LB Hugh Green (2nd team)
- Pro Bowlers: 3: LB Hugh Green; DE Lee Roy Selmon; NT Dave Logan (alternate)
- Team MVP: LB Hugh Green

The 1983 Tampa Bay Buccaneers season was the franchise's 8th season in the National Football League the 8th playing their home games at Tampa Stadium and the 8th under head coach John McKay. They failed to improve on their 5–4 record from 1982 and finished with an equal league-worst 2–14 record as personnel changes and a rash of injuries and missed out the playoffs for the first time since 1980.

The team was unable to agree on a contract with quarterback Doug Williams, resulting in his departure for the USFL. The loss of Williams was believed to be a major distraction to the team. Jack Thompson was acquired from the Cincinnati Bengals as what was termed "an insurance move" during Williams' negotiations, for a draft choice that would turn out to be the top pick in the 1984 NFL draft.

After the Buccaneers' first-ever undefeated preseason, the regular season began with a long losing streak. The Buccaneers missed Williams' strong arm and scrambling ability and were forced to remake their offense as a short passing attack, with running back James Wilder Sr. as the primary target. Opponents were able to shut down that short attack, and the Buccaneers were successful at neither running the ball nor completing deep passes. The team's record was somewhat deceptive: they lost numerous close games but failed to execute at key times. According to McKay, "I think the other teams looking at us respect us. I don't think anyone is volunteering to play us". Opposing coach Bud Grant pointed out that they were "losing games they should've won". The Buccaneers took their opponents into overtime several times during a season that included a record number of overtime games league-wide. Nine of their losses were by a touchdown or less, and six by a field goal or less. Several games were lost due to problems in the kicking game, which led to McKay's famous pronouncement that (kicker Bill) "Capece is kaput". This season ended the Buccaneers' streak of having made the playoffs during three of the last four seasons, and began an NFL-record streak of fourteen consecutive losing seasons, thirteen of which saw the team lose at least ten games.

Injuries plagued the team. James Wilder emerged as one of the NFL's best running backs, but was not able to finish the season due to injury. Eighteen different players spent time on the injured reserve list over the course of the season, and only three started all sixteen games. Every member of the offensive line suffered an early-season injury, and the linebackers and defensive backfield were also hit hard. McKay blamed the team's problems on lack of effort and threatened personnel changes, while admitting that replacements would not be readily found. Attendance declined, and fans called for McKay's retirement. Owner Hugh Culverhouse reported an expected loss of $1.25 million due to declining ticket sales, while merchants reported a drop in merchandise sales. The team's final 2–14 record tied them with the Houston Oilers for the league's worst mark, but the Buccaneers were awarded last place over the Oilers by virtue of their opponents' worse combined winning percentage.

== Offseason ==
The offense's ineffective performance in their 30–17 playoff loss to the Dallas Cowboys renewed criticism of the performance of the Buccaneer offense. Cowboys cornerback Everson Walls stated that the Buccaneers' game plan was very familiar, as it was exactly the same as on previous meetings. He also claimed that Doug Williams made postgame comments complaining of the offense's conservatism, although Williams said that his actual comments were misinterpreted by Walls. Coach John McKay responded by saying that he would continue to run the offense as usual, and not hire an offensive coordinator. Rumors began to fly that McKay was hoping for a good season so as to be able to retire on a winning note, with Dick Vermeil and Wayne Fontes mentioned as likely replacements.

=== Coaching changes ===
Offensive line coach Bill Johnson and quarterbacks coach Bill Nelsen were fired soon after the end of the 1982 season. Johnson was replaced by University of Miami offensive coordinator and former Florida Gators center Kim Helton. McKay described Helton as an excellent teacher in Miami's pro-style offense. University of Illinois receivers coach and former Bengal Chip Myers took over Dowler's vacated receivers' coach spot. The changes were criticized as cosmetic moves that replaced Johnson, who had notable success building offensive lines over a 23-year career, with Helton, who had no professional experience at all. Furthermore, the Buccaneers had allowed the fewest sacks of any NFL team during Johnson's four-year tenure.

=== Player movements ===
Several injured players left the Buccaneer roster in the spring. Jerry Eckwood was waived after failing a physical due to a back injury, Randy Crowder retired to take a coaching job at Penn State, and Bill Kollar was waived when he was deemed to be a medical risk if he played again. The loss of Kollar left the roster thin at defensive end, as there were only four players remaining at that position. Of these, Dave Stalls was trying to maintain Colorado residency in order to obtain a veterinary license, and so notified the club that he would retire if not traded to the Denver Broncos. Charley Hannah entered a contract dispute with the team, with the result that Sean Farrell began to be trained at tackle.

The offseason was marked by disputes over player salary. Offensive tackle Charley Hannah was unable to come to terms with the team, and was traded to the Los Angeles Raiders for defensive end Dave Browning and a 1984 fourth-round draft choice. Jimmie Giles held out of training camp, and attempted to use threats of leaving for the USFL as leverage to get his contract renegotiated. Giles, who was upset because the previous year's players' association contract expiration prevented a promised renegotiation from occurring, became the first Buccaneer to engage in a training camp holdout while under contract. Mark Cotney also had difficulty reaching an agreement with the team, but was eventually able to settle a contract. Lee Roy Selmon was awarded a new three-year contract that made him the highest-paid defensive end in the league.

McKay spoke of the need to begin replacing the aging original players, with the process already having begun at linebacker. However, the secondary featured four starters who were all at or near the age of 30, and who would all need to be replaced over the next couple of years.

==== The Doug Williams contract dispute ====
Doug Williams' original five-year contract expired at the beginning of the year. A published report of player salaries revealed that Williams, who had led the team to playoff appearances three out of the preceding four seasons, was the sixth-lowest-paid starting quarterback in the NFL. Eighteen NFL backup quarterbacks also had salaries higher than Williams'. His $120,000 salary was the same as that of Atlanta Falcons backup Mike Moroski, and behind that of both Dallas backup quarterbacks and some teams' punters and kickers. Buccaneer spokesman Rick Odioso responded that Williams had refused several offers to increase his salary and extend his contract, instead preferring to play the contract through to the end. Odioso also pointed out that the reported base salaries did not reflect performance and signing bonuses, on which the Buccaneers depended more heavily than most NFL teams. Believing his worth to have been around $400,000, which was in line with what most top NFL quarterbacks were being paid, Williams had rejected the team's contract offers in previous years in an attempt to force the team to pay him fairly or trade him.

Soon after the reporting of the salary, Williams' wife Janice developed severe headaches. A brain tumor was diagnosed, and emergency surgery was performed. She died a week later. The tragedy required that Williams leave his daughter to be raised by his mother in Louisiana, removing his personal ties to the Tampa area. It also delayed negotiations.

Despite rumors that he might retire or leave for the USFL, Williams expressed the desire to play the rest of his career as a Buccaneer before going into coaching, with an eventual goal of succeeding Eddie Robinson as coach of Grambling. The Buccaneers made an offer that owner Hugh Culverhouse called "generous" and said would place Williams among the five highest-paid NFL quarterbacks. Williams' agent denied this, saying that the Buccaneers' offer was for substantially less than several quarterbacks make, was less than what his client Joe Namath had received from the New York Jets in 1975, and that the Buccaneers should be embarrassed by it. Williams made two different salary demands during the negotiations, raising his demands when hearing about the salaries paid to Dan Fouts and to rookies John Elway and Tony Eason. The team made a second offer that was described by negotiator Phil Krueger as comparable to that paid to Atlanta Falcons quarterback Steve Bartkowski. Williams rejected this offer and began to speak of the USFL as a definite alternative. Williams' demands were in the range of $800,000 to $900,000. When Williams rejected the Buccaneers' offer, they traded the following year's first-round draft pick to the Cincinnati Bengals for backup quarterback Jack Thompson. Williams interpreted the move as a message that the team was no longer interested in his services, and suggested that the team's willingness to deal first-round draft picks was a sign of their reluctance to pay for top-quality talent. It is believed that, as a traditionally low-paying team (25th lowest of the 28 teams, according to union figures), the Buccaneers' salary structure would be disrupted by meeting Williams' demands, which might result in higher salary demands from Pro Bowlers such as Lee Roy Selmon and Jimmie Giles. It was later pointed out that the revenue lost through declining ticket sales would have more than covered the $200,000 gap between what Williams had demanded and the team had been willing to pay.

Krueger told Williams' agent, Jimmy Walsh, that the team's $400,000 offer would be withdrawn if Williams did not report for the opening of training camp. Williams and Walsh lowered their request to $600,000, a price that the team said they would have been willing to meet before the Thompson trade. Williams charged that he would not have been treated so poorly in negotiations had he been white, and said "I hope the Bucs go 0–16 but all my friends make the Pro Bowl". On August 9, Williams called a 28th-birthday press conference to announce his signing with the USFL Oklahoma Outlaws for a sum worth substantially more than what Tampa Bay offered, ending his time as a player with the Buccaneers. Williams also reported that guard Greg Roberts, a close friend who had encouraged him to sign with Oklahoma, was also considering moving to the USFL.

=== Draft ===
1983 Tampa Bay Buccaneers draft
Round	Pick	Player	Position	College	Notes
2	17	Randy Grimes	C	Baylor	
3	72	Jeremiah Castille	DB	Alabama	
4	99	Kelly Thomas	OT	USC	
5	131	Tony Chickillo	DT	Miami (FL)	
6	148	Rheugene Branton	WR	Texas Southern	Pick from SF
6	158	Ken Kaplan	OT	New Hampshire	
7	185	Weldon Ledbetter	RB	Oklahoma	
8	212	John Samuelson	LB	Azusa Pacific	
9	238	Hasson Arbubakrr	DT	Texas Tech	
10	270	Darius Durham	WR	San Diego State	
11	297	Mark Witte	TE	North Texas State	
12	324	John Higginbotham	DT	Northeastern State	
Made roster † Pro Football Hall of Fame * Made at least one Pro Bowl during career

The Buccaneers found themselves without a first-round pick, due to the previous season's much-criticized trade for the rights to select defensive end Booker Reese. Although Reese's development was slow, the team still claimed to have no regrets over the decision. The Buccaneers did not select until the 45th pick in the draft, with offensive line, linebacker, and defensive back considered to be need areas, although the team considered themselves to be a mature team with no glaring needs. Offensive line was considered to be a deep position in the draft, but the team did not expect to find an overlooked player the way they had Sean Farrell the previous year. Tackle Sid Abramowitz, linebacker Darryl Talley, and safety Dave Duerson were highly regarded candidates expected to be available in the mid-second round, although personnel director Ken Herock stated that the team would pick one of the premier quarterbacks (Williams was at that point still expected to sign) if one fell to them. The team eventually identified defensive backs Mike Richardson of Arizona State and Darrell Green of Texas A&I, and Baylor center Randy Grimes, as the three players they would most like to see available.

The extra 6th-round pick came from the San Francisco 49ers, in return for the Buccaneers' 1984 4th-round pick.

According to McKay, with the number of quality, improving young players already on the team, none of the twelve draft picks were expected to be able to unseat any of the established starters. The team drafted more for future help, especially at positions such as offensive tackle and defensive back, where the incumbent starters were aging. Randy Grimes, who the team said they would have picked even if All America center Dave Rimington had still been available, was to be given a look at tackle, despite never having played a position other than center. Grimes' selection was a surprise, as the Buccaneers were considered to already have a stockpile of talent at the interior line positions, but McKay felt that he was too good to pass up. Alabama cornerback Jeremiah Castille, who Bear Bryant had once called "pound for pound, the best player in the SEC", was considered short at 5 feet 9 inches (1.75 m), but was considered to have good speed and to play well against the run. Kelly Thomas and Ken Kaplan were huge offensive tackles with great upper body strength. Thomas, who McKay said would make the team unless he were to drop dead, was believed to potentially be comparable to his USC teammates Bruce Matthews and Don Mosebar, but had been overlooked due to having been an offensive lineman for only three years. Tony Chickillo was a defensive tackle who had fought back from a crushed pelvis to become a starter for the University of Miami. Wide receiver Rheugene Branton had been a star player at Tampa's C. Leon King High School. Hasson Arbubakrr was compared to a smaller version of Booker Reese. Weldon Ledbetter, Marcus Dupree's blocking back at Oklahoma, was considered to have slim chances against incumbent James Wilder Sr. Mark Witte was considered to have the same problem, behind Jimmie Giles and Jim Obradovich on the depth chart.

== Preseason ==
Culverhouse led a campaign, approved unanimously by league owners, to retain the expanded 49-player roster for the 1983 season. McKay criticized the players who were holding out for more money, saying that they lack understanding of how new contracts are negotiated. He had especially hard words for Jimmie Giles, who was being fined $1,000 for each day of camp missed, and who he said was in danger of falling behind the greatly improved Jerry Bell. Uncertainty over Giles' situation forced the team to spend a conditional draft pick on veteran Baltimore Colts tight end Reese McCall. Camp attendance was more important than usual, as the team added the most complicated offensive system that it had yet used. The loss of Williams was expected to be a factor in the team's attitude going into the season, as he was considered by teammates to be an exceptional athlete who could do things that few others could. The perception that management had not done everything possible to keep him was expected to create some resentment among the players. Williams pointed out that the debacle made him, and some of the team's other players, wonder whether management was committed to building a good team. The loss of Williams created resentment not only among the team, but among fans in Tampa's African-American community, where some boycotted games and hoped for a losing season. It was alleged that Culverhouse threw parties that cost more than what Williams had asked for. Some players were angered when they saw the money spent on players by USFL teams, contrasted with Culverhouse's reluctance to spend any money on players or the team.

Although some observers considered the Buccaneers to have their strongest lineup yet, preseason saw ten of the team's 24 starting positions up for contention. Holdouts, injuries, and the improvement of young players were given as reasons for the turnover. McKay expected to keep three quarterbacks on the roster, as he considered the team to lack a true No. 1 quarterback. The condition of the secondary was uncertain, as Norris Thomas was placed on the physically unable to perform list with a shoulder problem, and Cedric Brown's status was unknown due to a broken ankle. Danny Spradlin was acquired from the Dallas Cowboys for a future draft choice, to address the lack of depth at linebacker. Former FSU and British Columbia Lions running back Larry Key was signed as a free agent, with draft pick John Higginbotham waived to make room for him.

The preseason began with quarterbacks Golsteyn and Thompson relatively even, Golsteyn having a slight advantage due to his year of experience in the Tampa Bay offense. McKay described Kelly Thomas as "as good as any offensive lineman we've ever had in here", and compared his progress to that of Sean Farrell the previous year. The run defense, among the NFC's worst the previous season, continued to be a concern. Mental errors also continued to be a problem, with mistakes such as numerous penalties and running plays with only 10 men on the field. The quarterbacks continued to run neck-and-neck through the first two preseason games, with Golsteyn directing two fourth-quarter comebacks for wins. The later part of the preseason saw the offensive line solidifying, showing a previously unseen drive to move the ball into the end zone, rather than a contentment to let drives stall at around the 20-yard line. However, injuries became an issue, especially at linebacker, where the team was left with only three healthy veterans. A large number of offensive line injuries prompted McKay to keep an extra lineman on the roster. This meant cutting Dave Browning, for whom the team had just traded Charley Hannah. McKay remarked that Browning lacked the speed he'd shown in the past, and kept the much quicker Hasson Arbubakrr. Similarly, the team kept speedy rookie receiver Gene Branton, while cutting inconsistent longtime starter Gordon Jones. Final cuts included offseason acquisitions Larry Key, Reese McCall, and Rick Moser. The Buccaneers finished their first undefeated preseason with a 41–21 victory over the New England Patriots in which they scored the most points ever while setting records for yardage in a preseason game (492) and most points scored in a half (31). In preseason matchups, the Buccaneers were the NFL's highest-scoring team.

== Regular season ==
The team opened the season with starting quarterback Jerry Golsteyn, who had thrown only one NFL pass since 1978, and who had joined the Buccaneers the previous year while playing semi-professional football and working in an Orlando health club. Golsteyn was named the surprise starter after a strong preseason, but was demoted in favor of Jack Thompson after committing key errors in the first two games. Constant injury problems prevented the Buccaneers from establishing any consistency on offense. In addition to all offensive linemen suffering injuries, the team was left with only three healthy receivers when Kevin House pulled a muscle in the same week that Gene Branton was placed on injured reserve. The team continued the previous year's trend of needing to come back from second-half deficits, with the difference being that the team no longer had big-play potential. Observers felt that the team performed as though they had lost the confidence that they could score points when they needed to. The Buccaneers ranked last in the league in the ratio of touchdowns scored to touchdowns allowed. Despite the team's offensive woes, McKay refused to blame Thompson or any of the other quarterbacks, showing a patience similar to that which he showed with Doug Williams. He continued to state that Thompson was consistent and could become "a good solid quarterback", but acknowledged that he had not performed to expectations. He stated that the team would be looking to improve their quarterback situation the following year, but that the draft was expected to be short on quarterbacks, and that the team was not likely to be able to find a better player than Thompson through trades or free agency. A rumored trade for New York Giants quarterback Phil Simms never developed; Simms eventually broke his thumb and went on injured reserve. For the first three weeks of the season, the team ranked second in the NFC in defense, but last in offense. The defense collapsed after the third game, allowing 55, 27, and 34 points in the next three losses. McKay said that defensive players were beginning to worry about covering for other players instead of focusing on their own position, and that the defense was breaking down as a result. He also noted that the increased booing was causing the players to tighten up and play what McKay called "scared football". After McKay threatened to punch Milwaukee Sentinel reporter Bud Lea following a 55–14 loss to the Packers, a newspaper poll showed that 92% of Florida residents felt that McKay should be fired or announce his retirement.

Several injuries to the defensive backfield required that the team play more young players than they desired to, with the result that their pass defense fell among the league's worst after having led the NFC the previous season. Injuries later hit the linebacking corps. In a game against the Cardinals, the team had no experienced outside linebackers, and started two players who had both been with the team for less than two weeks and did not even know each other's names. The team continued to bring in linebackers unfamiliar with their system, despite the presence of a healthy, experienced Richard Wood. Their battered secondary received a boost when former Cowboys and Giants safety Beasley Reece, disgruntled over having his roster spot taken over by Terry Kinard, demanded a release and was claimed off waivers. Reece wound up as a starter, and became one of the league interception leaders. Two Buccaneers signed with the Denver Gold of the USFL: Dave Stalls, who was waived immediately, and offensive lineman George Yarno, who was to leave after finishing the season. As the season went on, an offensive strategy emerged: get the ball as much as possible to James Wilder, an all-purpose back with skills comparable to those of the Cardinals' Ottis Anderson. This was effective in a near-victory over the Pittsburgh Steelers, in which Wilder's 42 carries broke Franco Harris' NFL record (Wilder's record wound up being broken three weeks later by Butch Woolfolk of the Giants); and in their first win of the year, a victory over the Minnesota Vikings in which Wilder ran for 219 yards. However, broken ribs suffered the following week forced Wilder to miss the rest of the season, which in turn forced McKay to abandon efforts to fashion the Buccaneers as a running team. This roughly coincided with a general return to health along the offensive line, which resulted in a level of pass protection that allowed Thompson to break through with a run of seven touchdown passes in two games. Kicker Bill Capece wound up carrying much of the blame for the team's performance; one year after kicking several last-minute game-winning field goals that helped the team make the playoffs, he went 10–23 on field goal attempts. In the season finale, the team resorted to using George Yarno as the kicker on an extra-point attempt.

=== Schedule ===
Week	Date	Opponent	Result	Game site	Attendance	Record
1	September 4	**Detroit Lions**	**L** 11–0	Tampa Stadium	62,154	0–1
2	September 11	at **Chicago Bears**	**L** 17–10	Soldier Field	58,156	0–2
3	September 18	**Minnesota Vikings**	**L** 19–16 (OT)	Tampa Stadium	57,567	0–3
4	September 25	Cincinnati Bengals	**L** 23–17	Tampa Stadium	56,023	0–4
5	October 2	at **Green Bay Packers**	**L** 55–14	Lambeau Field	54,272	0–5
6	October 9	at Dallas Cowboys	**L** 27–24 (OT)	Texas Stadium	63,308	0–6
7	October 16	St. Louis Cardinals	**L** 34–27	Tampa Stadium	48,224	0–7
8	October 23	New Orleans Saints	**L** 24–21	Tampa Stadium	48,242	0–8
9	October 30	at Pittsburgh Steelers	**L** 17–12	Three Rivers Stadium	57,648	0–9
10	November 6	at **Minnesota Vikings**	**W** 17–12	Hubert H. Humphrey Metrodome	59,239	1–9
11	November 13	at Cleveland Browns	**L** 20–0	Cleveland Municipal Stadium	56,091	1–10
12	November 20	**Chicago Bears**	**L** 27–0	Tampa Stadium	36,816	1–11
13	November 27	Houston Oilers	**W** 33–24	Tampa Stadium	38,625	2–11
14	December 4	at San Francisco 49ers	**L** 35–21	Candlestick Park	49,773	2–12
15	December 12	**Green Bay Packers**	**L** 12–9 (OT)	Tampa Stadium	50,763	2–13
16	December 18	at **Detroit Lions**	**L** 23–20	Pontiac Silverdome	78,392	2–14
Notes: Division opponents in **bold** text.

== Standings ==
NFC Central
	W	L	T	PCT	DIV	CONF	PF	PA	STK
^{(3)} Detroit Lions	9	7	0	.563	7–1	8–4	347	286	W1
Green Bay Packers	8	8	0	.500	4–4	6–6	429	439	L1
Chicago Bears	8	8	0	.500	4–4	7–7	311	301	W2
Minnesota Vikings	8	8	0	.500	4–4	4–8	316	348	W1
Tampa Bay Buccaneers	2	14	0	.125	1–7	1–11	241	380	L3

== Personnel ==
Tampa Bay Buccaneers 1983 roster
**Quarterbacks**: 11 Jerry Golsteyn; 7 Jeff Komlo; 14 **Jack Thompson**; **Running backs**: 46 **Adger Armstrong**; 28 **Mel Carver**; 43 Terdell Middleton; 1 Michael Morton; 26 **James Owens**; **Wide receivers**: 83 Theo Bell; 87 **Gerald Carter**; 89 **Kevin House**; 81 Andre Tyler; **Tight ends**: 82 **Jerry Bell**; 88 **Jimmie Giles**; 86 **Jim Obradovich**; 85 Mark Witte	**Offensive linemen**: 77 Glenn Bujnoch G; 62 **Sean Farrell** RG; 60 **Randy Grimes** LG/C; 56 Jim Leonard C; 75 **Dave Reavis** LT; 74 **Gene Sanders** LT; 72 **Ray Snell** LG; 70 **Kelly Thomas** RT; 68 **George Yarno** LG; **Defensive linemen**: 68 Hasson Arbubakrr DE; 78 **John Cannon** LDE; 76 **Dave Logan** NT; 66 **Booker Reese** LDE; 63 **Lee Roy Selmon** RDE; 90 Brad White NT	**Linebackers**: 52 **Scot Brantley** RILB; 58 **Jeff Davis** LILB; 53 **Hugh Green** ROLB; 51 **Ed Judie** LOLB; 55 Danny Spradlin ILB; 59 Robert Thompson OLB; 54 Richard Wood ILB; **Defensive backs**: 23 **Jeremiah Castille** LCB; 44 **Mark Cotney** SS; 21 **John Holt** LCB; 24 Tom Morris SS; 43 **Beasley Reece** FS; 22 Johnny Ray Smith CB; 41 **Norris Thomas** CB; 40 **Mike Washington** RCB; **Special teams**: 3 Bill Capece K; 5 Frank Garcia P; 2 Dave Warnke K	**Reserve lists**: 61 Don Bailey C (IR); 80 Gene Branton WR (IR); 34 **Cedric Brown** S (IR); 30 David Barrett RB (IR); 71 Tony Chickillo NT (IR); 20 Neal Colzie S (IR); 59 **Andy Hawkins** LB (IR); 8 Bob Hewko QB (IR); 56 Cecil Johnson LB (IR); 79 Ken Kaplan T (IR); 29 Sandy LaBeaux CB (IR); 64 Quentin Lowry LB (IR); 32 **James Wilder** RB (IR); 50 **Steve Wilson** C (IR); rookies in italics **Starters in boldface**

=== Coaching staff ===
Tampa Bay Buccaneers 1983 coaching staff
**Front office**: Owner – Hugh Culverhouse; **Head coaches**: Head coach – John McKay; **Offensive coaches**: Offensive line – Kim Helton; Quarterbacks – Boyd Dowler; Receivers – Chip Myers; Running backs – Jim Gruden	**Defensive coaches**: Defensive coordinator/secondary – Wayne Fontes; Defensive line – Abe Gibron; Linebackers – Howard Tippett; Special teams – Frank Emanuel

== Game summaries ==
=== Week 1: vs Detroit Lions ===
	1	2	3	4	Total
Lions	5	0	3	3	11
Buccaneers	0	0	0	0	0

September 4, 1983, at Tampa Stadium, Tampa, Florida

Lions defensive end William Gay recorded 5 1/2 sacks, six tackles and two assists, while Doug English sacked Jerry Golsteyn in the end zone for a safety, creating the only NFL game to ever finish with an 11–0 scoreline.

Eddie Murray kicked field goals of 29, 48, and 38 yards. Tampa Bay drove deep into Lions territory twice, stopped on fourth-and-one in the first quarter, and forced to punt from the Lions' 30-yard line in the fourth. Dave Reavis suffered a sprained knee early in the game. McKay later said that both quarterbacks performed well when given the time to throw. Jimmie Giles saw limited duty. Kelly Thomas left the game with heat exhaustion. The seven sacks allowed by the Buccaneers were the result of first-half injuries to three Buccaneer tackles; Reavis, Thomas, and Gene Sanders. The injuries left the team with four guards and a center, but no tackles. Mark Cotney went on injured reserve after suffering a broken thumb that required surgery.

=== Week 2: at Chicago Bears ===
	1	2	3	4	Total
Buccaneers	0	3	7	0	10
Bears	0	10	0	7	17

September 11, 1983, at Soldier Field, Chicago

Offensive line injuries continued, as Steve Wilson and Randy Grimes both injured their snapping hands, and guard Ray Snell bruised his wrist. Despite the absence of three starting linemen, the Buccaneers held the Bears defense to two sacks. The Buccaneers missed numerous opportunities to win or tie the game, including being stopped on three consecutive plays from the one-yard line, dropping interceptions, and committing turnovers. An apparent Melvin Carver touchdown reception was nullified when he failed to keep his feet in bounds. On the following series, a faked reverse by Bears quarterback Jim McMahon fooled cornerback John Holt, freeing Walter Payton for a touchdown reception. A last-minute drive ended when Michael Morton fumbled at the Bears' 26-yard line. Another fourth-quarter drive ended when Jerry Golsteyn threw the ball directly to Chicago cornerback Terry Schmidt.

=== Week 3: vs Minnesota Vikings ===
	1	2	3	4	OT	Total
Vikings	7	6	0	3	3	19
Buccaneers	0	6	3	7	0	16

September 18, 1983, at Tampa Stadium, Tampa, Florida

New Vikings signee Benny Ricardo kicked a 38-yard field goal with 28 seconds remaining to send the game into overtime, then kicked a 42-yarder to win the game. It followed a fake field goal attempt that nearly resulted in an interception of a Steve Dils pass. Bill Capece missed two kicks, including one from 33 yards in overtime. The Buccaneers squandered two chances at victory: one the missed overtime field goal, the other a 16–13 fourth-quarter lead they lost when a mixup in coverage allowed a 31-yard reception by Terry LeCount that set up a game-tying field goal. The Vikings took an early 10–0 lead on a LeCount touchdown catch and a Ricardo field goal, but the Buccaneers came back with touchdowns on a James Owens run and a James Wilder reception. Tommy Kramer and Keith Nord required season-ending surgeries for torn ligaments suffered in the game. The crowd of 57,567 was the Buccaneers' smallest since 1980.

=== Week 4: vs Cincinnati Bengals ===
	1	2	3	4	Total
Bengals	14	6	0	3	23
Buccaneers	0	7	3	7	17

September 25, 1983, at Tampa Stadium, Tampa, Florida

The matchup featured two statistically similar teams, both with 0–3 records. The Bengals entered the game with the NFL's 27th-ranked offense, but were able to move the ball easily against a Buccaneer defense that had performed well in the three previous games. Ken Anderson completed all of his first-half passes, and moved past Len Dawson into tenth place all-time in NFL career passing, with 28,775 yards. James Wilder tied his team record of 11 receptions, and gained a career-best 126 receiving yards. Jack Thompson's 75% completion percentage against Cincinnati was a team record. Bengal Ken Riley scored a first-quarter touchdown on his 59th career interception, the most among active players. Riley then sat out the rest of the game, having pulled his hamstring on the return. McKay criticized Thompson for giving Riley an easy interception by not throwing far enough toward the sideline on an out pattern. After falling behind 20–7, Thompson rallied the team to within six points with a 15-yard fourth-quarter touchdown pass to Kevin House. Robert Jackson preserved the win for the Bengals by intercepting another Thompson pass in the end zone. The win ended the Bengals' eight-game (including the 1982 postseason and the 1983 preseason) losing streak, dating back to January.

=== Week 5: at Green Bay Packers ===
	1	2	3	4	Total
Buccaneers	0	7	0	7	14
Packers	14	35	0	6	55

Oct 2 1983 at Lambeau Field, Green Bay, Wisconsin

The win was Green Bay's first over the Buccaneers in seven meetings. The Buccaneers had only 20 yards rushing. The Packers' 49 first-half points broke their old NFL record of 45 in a single half, set in 1967. Their 55 points were the most scored by the team during Bart Starr's 9-year tenure as head coach, and were only two less than Tampa Bay's entire season total. Jan Stenerud's seven extra points and two field goals moved him past Jim Turner into second place all-time in NFL scoring, with 1,447 points. James Lofton became the fifth Packers receiver with 300 receptions, and had his 20th 100-yard receiving day.

Green Bay scored first on Phil Epps' 90-yard punt return, and then a 75-yard pass from Lynn Dickey to Jessie Clark. In the second quarter, they scored on a 1-yard Harlan Huckleby run, passes to Paul Coffman and Lofton, a 35-yard Mike Douglass fumble return, and a 27-yard John Anderson interception return. The Buccaneers scored on a 21-yard Hugh Green interception return, and a 2-yard James Owens run. When a reporter asked about the team's ineptitude, McKay called it the most disgraceful performance he'd ever seen, and then threatened to punch the reporter. At least eight negative team records were broken, including the longest punt return and pass play by a Buccaneer opponent (Epps' 90-yard return and Dickey's 75-yard touchdown), most passing yards (363), points (55), and touchdowns (7) allowed in a game, and most points allowed in a quarter (35). James Lofton's four receptions for 112 yards made him the first wide receiver to catch for 100 yards in a single game against Tampa Bay. Dickey's three touchdown passes and Green Bay's seven touchdowns tied the records for a Tampa Bay opponent, and the final score was 1 point short of the team's biggest-ever margin of defeat.

Eight of the team's 22 starters missed the game with injuries. Several linebackers and members of the secondary were playing either out-of-position or hurt. The aftermath of the game saw several lineup changes. McKay alleged that several players were not putting forth full effort, although he admitted that better players were not available. Terdell Middleton was waived and replaced by Adger Armstrong, without ever having gained a single yard for the Buccaneers. Cecil Johnson and Neal Colzie were placed on injured reserve.

=== Week 6: at Dallas Cowboys ===
	1	2	3	4	OT	Total
Buccaneers	10	0	7	7	0	24
Cowboys	7	7	3	7	3	27

October 9, 1983, at Texas Stadium, Irving, Texas

The Cowboys got their sixth come-from-behind victory in six games, despite being outplayed by the Buccaneers. Tampa Bay remained (with Houston) one of only two winless teams. Buccaneer defensive lapses allowed the Cowboys to move the ball when they needed to. Fourteen Buccaneer penalties for 185 yards, the most ever by a Cowboys opponent and five yards short of the Buccaneer team record, led to 13 Cowboy points. The most damaging was a running-into-the-kicker penalty against Thomas Morris that gave Rafael Septién a second, successful chance to kick a game-winning field goal. The miscues erased the Buccaneers' best offensive performance to this point in the season. With the Buccaneers playing the same offensive line for two weeks in a row the first time all season, they were able to score the most points they ever had against the Cowboys. The secondary got a boost from the return of Mark Cotney. The linebacking corps received a blow only days after the loss of Cecil Johnson, when Andy Hawkins suffered a season-ending knee injury and was replaced by former 49ers linebacker Ed Judie, described by McKay as "a guy who just got in Thursday".

=== Week 7: vs St. Louis Cardinals ===
	1	2	3	4	Total
Cardinals	3	10	14	7	34
Buccaneers	6	0	14	7	27

October 16, 1983, at Tampa Stadium, Tampa, Florida

The Cardinals got only their second win of the season, after a Buccaneer rally failed to overcome a 27–6 deficit. The Cardinals had been the last remaining NFL team never to have beaten the Buccaneers. Numerous players missed starts due to injuries, including Sean Farrell and Dave Reavis. Booker Reese made his first start, in place of the injured John Cannon. Hugh Green missed the start due to a hamstring injury, and was replaced by Robert Thompson, a rookie claimed off of waivers from Houston the previous week. Jeff Davis' 18 tackles set a new Buccaneer record. Cardinals quarterback Neil Lomax passed for touchdowns to Roy Green and Doug Marsh in the span of 26 seconds in the third quarter, and three touchdowns in all. The Buccaneers then scored twice in 63 seconds, with a 23-yard pass from Jack Thompson to Theo Bell and a 33-yard Hugh Green interception return, closing the score to 27–20. The Buccaneers were then held scoreless until an 11-yard pass to Jimmie Giles with one second left. Tampa Stadium fans not only booed the Buccaneers, but began to cheer for the Cardinals. When asked afterward about the Buccaneers' outlook, McKay replied, "Bleak". Some fans wore bags on their heads, one of which read, "We want Ed Biles", referring to the recently fired Houston Oilers coach.

=== Week 8: vs New Orleans Saints ===
	1	2	3	4	Total
Saints	0	10	14	0	24
Buccaneers	14	7	0	0	21

October 23, 1983, at Tampa Stadium, Tampa, Florida

Squandering an opportunity to put the game away, the Buccaneers went scoreless after taking a 21–10 lead. The Saints' offense was able to score enough points to win, despite being thwarted all day by the Tampa Bay defense. The two offenses combined for 127 passing yards and 214 interception yards. Rookie Jeremiah Castille intercepted a Ken Stabler pass for his first career interception, and returned it 69 yards for the Buccaneers' second touchdown. James Wilder scored two touchdowns, catching nine passes for 50 yards, and rushing for a team season-high 64 yards. Jack Thompson was sacked seven times and intercepted thrice by the Saints. Racial slurs mixed in with the boos, with some fans telling Thompson (actually a native of American Samoa) to go back to Africa. Lee Roy Selmon and Cedric Brown left the game with ankle injuries, Gene Sanders pulled a calf muscle, and center Steve Wilson missed the game with the flu. Saints coach Bum Phillips afterward noted that the team missed Doug Williams. McKay later expressed concern over Thompson's progress, but continued to stand behind him as the team's starting quarterback.

=== Week 9: at Pittsburgh Steelers ===
	1	2	3	4	Total
Buccaneers	6	3	3	0	12
Steelers	0	0	0	17	17

October 30, 1983, at Three Rivers Stadium, Pittsburgh, Pennsylvania

The Pittsburgh Steelers played poorly for three-quarters, allowing the Buccaneers to take a 12–0 lead despite the coaching staff's admonitions not to be fooled by the Buccaneers' 0–8 record. James Wilder's 42 carries broke Franco Harris' NFL record, Bill Capece kicked four field goals, and the defense forced seven turnovers. Newcomer Beasley Reece caught two of Cliff Stoudt's three interceptions. The Buccaneer offense was held without a touchdown. The Steelers came to life in the fourth quarter with rookie Wayne Capers' first NFL touchdown reception, a 57-yard punt return by Paul Skansi that set up a 42-yard Gary Anderson field goal, and a 2-yard Frank Pollard touchdown run. A wide-open Kevin House dropped a potentially game-winning touchdown pass in the fourth quarter. McKay's entire postgame press conference consisted of two sentences: "We did not play well enough to win. We lost our ninth straight game and that is it". McKay later blamed blown assignments and media distractions for the loss. He said that players were bothered by rumors that injured linebacker Andy Hawkins had signed with a USFL team.

=== Week 10: at Minnesota Vikings ===
	1	2	3	4	Total
Buccaneers	0	7	7	3	17
Vikings	7	2	0	3	12

November 6, 1983, at Hubert H. Humphrey Metrodome, Minneapolis, Minnesota

Tampa Bay upset Minnesota to leave the Houston Oilers as the league's only winless team. Wilder's 75-yard third-quarter run gave the Buccaneers the lead for good, and was the longest run play in team history. His 219 yards broke Ricky Bell's single-game team record of 167, and were the second most yards ever gained against the Vikings, behind Walter Payton's NFL single-game record 275 in 1977. David Logan scored the first touchdown, a 54-yard return of a fumble caused by a Lee Roy Selmon sack of Steve Dils. This was Logan's third career fumble-return touchdown, one short of the NFL record. Ted Brown left the game after injuring his shoulder while scoring the Vikings' only touchdown. Steve Dils was hospitalized overnight after a hard hit left him disoriented. Gene Sanders, Lee Roy Selmon, Jimmie Giles, Randy Grimes, and Hugh Green all left the game with injuries. Selmon's injury was the result of an illegal chop block to the knee, one play after his sack of Dils. Some observers had predicted the upset, given the Buccaneers' performance through three-quarters of the previous week's game, and the Vikings' struggles over the past several weeks.

=== Week 11: at Cleveland Browns ===
	1	2	3	4	Total
Buccaneers	0	0	0	0	0
Browns	10	0	3	7	20

November 13, 1983, at Cleveland Municipal Stadium, Cleveland, Ohio

The Browns' victory over the Buccaneers was their first shutout since 1974. Jimmie Giles was held out of the game with an injury, while Mike Washington became the third member of the opening-day secondary to go on injured reserve. Injuries to starting defensive ends Lee Roy Selmon and John Cannon contributed to the lack of pressure on Cleveland quarterback Brian Sipe, who had time to complete 14 of 26 passes for 174 yards and no interceptions. Rookie cornerback Jeremiah Castille had seven tackles, but was exploited by Sipe throughout the game. The Buccaneers' best scoring opportunity ended when Jerry Bell dropped a pass in the end zone. Long snapper Steve Wilson played with a broken bone in his right hand, which contributed to Bill Capece's missed field goal attempts of 23 and 31 yards. For the second week in a row, Melvin Carver fumbled on his first play of the game. The Browns defense was able to stifle James Wilder, who was held to 62 yards on 19 carries before a blow to the chest from the helmet of linebacker Eddie Johnson knocked him out of the game. Nevertheless, he became only the second Buccaneer (after Ricky Bell in 1979) to combine for over 1,000 yards rushing and receiving in a season. The injury, which Wilder called a "cheap shot", ended his season. McKay did not bother to show up for the postgame press conference, making reporters wait for 15 minutes but issuing only a brief written statement through a spokesperson.

=== Week 12: vs Chicago Bears ===
	1	2	3	4	Total
Bears	0	14	6	7	27
Buccaneers	0	0	0	0	0

November 20, 1983, at Tampa Stadium, Tampa, Florida

Several of the previous game's starters missed the game with injuries, including James Wilder, Jack Thompson, and both starting defensive ends (Lee Roy Selmon and John Cannon). Walter Payton rushed for 106 yards despite having been held out of practice the preceding week with fluid on his knee. In the process, he also passed 1,000 yards for the season, and moved past O. J. Simpson into third place on the NFL's all-time career rushing list with 11,257 yards. It was Payton's 53rd career 100-yard game and his seventh 1,000-yard season, which tied the record of Jim Brown and Franco Harris, the two players ahead of him on the career list. It also left him with 315 pass receptions, third all-time among Bears players and one short of Mike Ditka's total.

Matt Suhey ran for 112 yards, a career best. The game was played in a heavy downpour, which contributed to the attendance of 36,816, the lowest in Buccaneer history. Jerry Golsteyn started in place of Jack Thompson, who had a bruised elbow. The Buccaneers totaled only 132 yards of offense, 42 of it on a single pass from Golsteyn to Kevin House at the end of the first half. The ineffective Golsteyn was replaced with Jeff Komlo in the fourth quarter. Golsteyn completed 3 of 13 passes for 49 yards and an interception. The Bears' 273 yards rushing was the most the Buccaneers had ever allowed, just one week after an opponent compared the physicality of the Tampa Bay defense to that of the Pittsburgh Steelers. Komlo was sacked three times, and his first pass was intercepted. He moved ahead of Golsteyn on the depth chart following the game. It was the first time since 1977, the week before their first franchise victory, that the Buccaneers had been shut out on consecutive weekends. McKay said of his defense's effort: "Based on today, none of them are going to the Hall of Fame...then again, neither am I".

=== Week 13: vs Houston Oilers ===
	1	2	3	4	Total
Oilers	0	3	7	14	24
Buccaneers	0	12	14	7	33

November 27, 1983, at Tampa Stadium, Tampa, Florida

The Buccaneers won the matchup between the two teams with the league's worst records, referred to variously as the "Turkey Bowl", the "Toilet Bowl", and the "Repus Bowl". It was the first time since the AFL merger that a meeting had occurred between two teams with such poor records so late in the season. Steve Wulf wrote of the game, "Yes, this was the Small One, the battle of the beatens, the movable object meeting the resistible force. There were only tomorrows. When these two teams get together, nothing can happen. This game was for a marble." There were 20,474 no-shows for the game; some of the fans in attendance held up a banner that read "Our Wives Think We're at a Pro Football Game".

The offensive line suffered no major injuries for the first time all season, with the result that Jack Thompson had time to complete four touchdown passes. The first was to fullback Adger Armstrong, who had been released by the Oilers earlier in the year. Thompson also threw two to Kevin House and one to Jim Obradovich, and completed 17 of 29 passes for 224 yards with no interceptions. The Buccaneers got three interceptions, one by Booker Reece and two by Beasley Reece. The early Tampa Bay lead kept Earl Campbell from becoming a factor in the game.

=== Week 14: at San Francisco 49ers ===
	1	2	3	4	Total
Buccaneers	0	7	7	7	21
49ers	0	14	14	7	35

December 4, 1983, at Candlestick Park, San Francisco, California

The 49ers were able to move the ball easily against the injury-riddled Buccaneer defense. Six defensive starters missed the game. By the end of the day, the only regular defensive starter still on the field was Ed Judie, who was not with the team at the beginning of the season. The Tampa Bay defense was able to hold Joe Montana to no touchdowns passing, but he scored on a 12-yard run, while Roger Craig ran for three touchdowns. The 49ers had their highest rushing total since 1978, with 227 yards. Jack Thompson threw for 337 yards and three touchdowns, with Kevin House accounting for 156 yards and a touchdown on six receptions.

=== Week 15: vs Green Bay Packers ===
	1	2	3	4	OT	Total
Packers	3	0	3	3	3	12
Buccaneers	0	3	0	6	0	9

December 12, 1983, at Tampa Stadium, Tampa, Florida

Tampa Bay entered the game hoping to avenge their embarrassing early-season loss, by spoiling the Packers' playoff hopes. Instead, the Packers won the game to tie the Detroit Lions for the division lead. The Buccaneer defense kept Green Bay's second-ranked offense out of the end zone for the entire game. The Buccaneer offense was criticized for being overly conservative, although receiver Theo Bell pointed out that the Packers' style of defense left better rushing opportunities, due to the defensive backs' double-coverage of the outside receivers. Jan Stenerud's second field goal moved him past George Blanda's record of 335 career field goals. Stenerud went on to kick two more, one to put the game into overtime, and the other to win. McKay publicly blamed Bill Capece for the loss, as did Monday Night Football announcer Don Meredith, after Capece missed an extra-point attempt and a potentially game-winning field goal attempt. Stenerud expressed sympathy for Capece, pointing out the difficulty of kicking when the team is constantly rotating the snapper and holder, as the Buccaneers had been doing. McKay later vowed not to attempt any field goals in the following week's game, and said, "I'm tired of being crucified by all these wonderful Florida people. God bless you and merry Christmas".

=== Week 16: at Detroit Lions ===
	1	2	3	4	Total
Buccaneers	7	6	0	7	20
Lions	0	10	3	10	23

December 18, 1983, at Pontiac Silverdome, Pontiac, Michigan

Bill Capece did not make the trip to Detroit, reportedly having walked off of the practice field during the week due to McKay's public criticism of his performance. The Buccaneers signed Dave Warnke, a rookie who had lasted with the Lions until the final roster cuts, but who had never attempted a regular-season NFL kick. When Warnke missed a field goal and an extra-point attempt, guard George Yarno became the first offensive lineman to kick an extra point in an NFL game. Observers pointed out the irony of Warnke and Capece blaming their kicking troubles on instability at the snapper and holder positions, while the USFL-bound Yarno, a lineman who had not kicked since high school, connected on his only career attempt. The missed kicks provided the margin of defeat and nullified an effective passing attack. Jack Thompson completed 28 of 43 passes for 373 yards, the second-highest total in Buccaneer history.

== Awards and records ==
=== Awards and honors ===
- Mark Cotney, Sports Illustrated All-Pro Team

=== Team and individual records ===
The following team records set in 1983 still stand:

- Most single-game rushing yards (219, by James Wilder at Minnesota on 11/6)
- Most total single-game yards (239, James Wilder at Minnesota)
- Most team fumbles in a season (39)
- Most single-game fumbles recovered (4 vs. Pittsburgh on 10/30, since tied twice)
- Most points scored by an opponent in a single half (49 by Green Bay on 10/2)
- Most points scored by an opponent in a single quarter (35, Green Bay)
- Most single-game return touchdowns by an opponent (3 by Green Bay, tied with two others)
- Most rushing touchdowns by an opponent (5 by San Francisco on 12/4)
- Most rushing first downs by an opponent (18, also San Francisco)

The following team records set in 1983 have since been broken:

- Most single-game rushing attempts (James Wilder, 42 vs. Pittsburgh on 10/30; broken by Wilder vs. Green Bay on 9/30/84.) Wilder's 42 attempts remain the record for a regulation game, as he had 5 overtime carries in the 1984 game. The 42 carries also set an NFL record, which was broken by Butch Woolfolk of the New York Giants on 11/20/83.
- Longest rushing play (75 yards, James Wilder at Minnesota on 11/6, broken by Warrick Dunn vs. Chicago on 12/21/97)
- Most sacks allowed (42, broken in 1999)
- Longest pass by an opponent (80 yards by Danny White of Dallas on 10/9, broken by Jim Harbaugh of Chicago on 10/18/1992)
- Most punt return yards by an opposing player (Phil Epps of Green Bay on 10/2, broken by Vai Sikahema of St. Louis with 145 on 12/21/1986)
- Longest punt return by an opposing player (90 by Epps in the same game, broken by Glyn Milburn of Chicago on 9/20/1998)
- Most rushing yards by an opponent (273, Chicago on 11/20, broken by the L. A. Rams on 11/25/1984)
- Hugh Green tied Richard Wood's and Cedric Brown's record of two defensive touchdowns for the season, broken by Wayne Haddix in 1990.
- Jack Thompson's 373 passing yards against Detroit on 12/19 were the second best in franchise history (behind Doug Williams' 486 on 11/16/1980), and are currently sixth-best in franchise history
- 43 fumbles forced is second all-time, after the 1979 team
- 96 punts is second all-time, after the 1978 team
- 377 single-game passing yards allowed was second all-time (behind Lynn Dickey of Green Bay on 10/12/1980, both were overtime games)
- Green Bay's 519 total yards and 355 passing yards were the second highest (highest in a regulation game) until 10/7/1984
