= 1985 Tampa Bay Buccaneers season =

NFL team season

- Owner: Hugh Culverhouse
- General manager: Phil Krueger
- Head coach: Leeman Bennett
- Home stadium: Tampa Stadium

Results
- Record: 2–14
- Division place: 5th NFC Central
- Playoffs: Did not qualify
- All-Pros: 1: TE Jimmie Giles (honorable mention)
- Pro Bowlers: 2: TE Jimmie Giles; RB James Wilder Sr. (alternate)
- Team MVP: RB James Wilder Sr.

The 1985 Tampa Bay Buccaneers season was the franchise's tenth season in the National Football League, the tenth playing their home games at Tampa Stadium and the first season under head coach Leeman Bennett. The team failed to improve on a 6–10 season, once again finishing at 2–14, the same as in 1983.

In week 1, Tampa Bay held a 28–17 halftime lead over the eventual Super Bowl winning Chicago Bears. In fact, both games against the Bears provided Tampa Bay halftime leads. Steve Young won his first start against the Detroit Lions before the losses started to pile on, including playing in a foot of snow in Green Bay. The Buccaneers failed to improve on their 6–10 record, and finished 2–14, the worst in the NFL. The Bucs lost their first nine games before shutting out the Cardinals 16–0 in Tampa to finally get in the win column. One week later, the Buccaneers were humiliated, 62–28, in New York by the Jets. The 62 points allowed during the game were the most points allowed by any team during the 1980s and are the most allowed in franchise history. After a win in overtime against the Lions, the Buccaneers would then lose three consecutive games to finish the season.

== Offseason ==
=== Hiring Leeman Bennett ===
Former Atlanta Falcons coach Leeman Bennett was named by owner Hugh Culverhouse as the replacement for retired head coach John McKay. Other candidates interviewed included Buccaneer defensive coordinator Wayne Fontes, Seattle Seahawks defensive coordinator Tom Catlin, former Michigan Panthers head coach Jim Stanley, former New England Patriots head coach Ron Meyer, Washington Redskins quarterback coach Jerry Rhome, former Pittsburgh Steelers defensive coordinator Bud Carson, and former Florida Gators coach Charley Pell. Bennett was an unexpected choice, as Fontes had long been considered to be the leading candidate and had the near-unanimous support of the players and existing staff. Culverhouse almost gave Fontes the job without conducting an interview process, before having second thoughts and soliciting recommendations from McKay, Tex Schramm, and Dan Rooney. Described as "heartbroken", Fontes learned while attending a scouting combine in Arizona that he had been passed over for the job. Bennett indicated that nobody who had been a candidate for the head coaching job would be hired as an assistant, ending speculation that he might retain Fontes or bring in his former assistant Jim Stanley. Fontes eventually accepted the defensive coordinator position with the Detroit Lions.

Bennett had served as the Los Angeles Rams' offensive coordinator under Chuck Knox before taking the Falcons’ job, where he became the only coach to lead that franchise to the playoffs. He did so three times, and was fired after their third playoff appearance, when the owners felt that a change was necessary in order for the Falcons to advance further. The Falcons finished in last place in the NFC West in both of the years following Bennett's firing. Twice named NFC Coach of the Year, Bennett was well respected as a coach, with the only knock against him being a reputation as possibly "too nice". Although Bennett was one of the candidates recommended by McKay, his easygoing style was considered to be a complete opposite to McKay. He vowed to keep the 3–4 defensive alignment with which Tampa Bay had been so successful, and said that the team would be a playoff contender in 1985. He believed that they had a good nucleus of players, although he admitted to knowing little about their personnel.

Jerry Glanville, the coordinator of the league-leading 1977 Falcons defense, indicated that he would be unavailable due to his contractual ties to the Houston Oilers. The offensive coordinator position was filled by Jimmy Raye, a former Bennett assistant who had been holding the same position with the Rams. Offensive line coach Kim Helton and linebackers coach Howard Tippett were the only assistants to be retained by the new regime. Rams assistant Vic Rapp was brought in as the running backs coach. Former Michigan Panthers defensive coordinator Dick Roach was brought in as the defensive backfield coach. Longtime trainer Tom Oxley was replaced by former Falcon trainer Jay Shoop.

=== Personnel moves ===
Although he and Jimmie Giles had been hoping that the staff turnover would restore their playing time, Richard Wood was not re-signed. Maurice Harvey and Jeff Komlo were also released. Re-signed were: Michael Morton, Adger Armstrong, Leon Bright, Cedric Brown, Robert Thompson and Glenn Bujnoch. Morton eventually rejected his contract offer, and signed with the Washington Redskins. Vagas Ferguson, a former star running back at Notre Dame and a one-time 1st-round draft choice of the New England Patriots, was signed as a free agent.

=== NFL draft ===
This was the first time in three years that the Buccaneers held a first-round pick on draft day, and they indicated that they needed much defensive help. The defensive line and linebacker positions lacked depth, and the secondary was aging. Of the three premier defensive ends available, Bruce Smith had already been signed by the Buffalo Bills, who held the first overall choice, and Ray Childress was expected to be taken by the Houston Oilers, leaving University of Washington defensive end Ron Holmes as Tampa Bay's most likely selection with the eighth overall pick. Director of player personnel Jim Gruden described his as having the combination of size and speed, versatility, and a productive college career that the Buccaneers desired.

Pick	Round	Player	Position	College
8	1	Ron Holmes	Defensive end	Washington
64	3	Ervin Randle	Linebacker	Baylor
92	4	Mike Heaven	Cornerback	Illinois
176	7	Mike Prior	Free Safety	Illinois State
204	8	Phil Freeman	Wide receiver	Arizona State
232	9	Steve Calabria	Quarterback	Colgate
260	10	Donald Igwebuike	Kicker	Clemson
288	11	Punkin Williams	Running back	Memphis State
316	12	Jim Rockford	Defensive back	Oklahoma
330	12 (Note: from L.A. Rams)	James Melka	Linebacker	Wisconsin

The Buccaneers' second-round pick went to the Denver Broncos as part of the trade for Steve DeBerg. Their fifth-round pick went to the New York Jets for running back Scott Dierking. Their sixth-round pick was traded to the Cincinnati Bengals for tackle Don Swafford. The second round 12 pick came from the Los Angeles Rams in exchange for defensive end Booker Reese.

==== Draft selections ====
Holmes was chosen over Eddie Brown, who was not expected to have been available with the eighth-overall pick. Bennett decided that, with the passing game already performing well, it was more important to select for defense. The Buccaneers envisioned Holmes as a starting end, opposite of Lee Roy Selmon and with Dave Logan at nose tackle. Holmes was named first-team All-America by five different organizations, and was once much-coveted by Memphis State and DePaul as a basketball recruit. Ervin Randle was a versatile linebacker who had also played defensive end and nose tackle at Baylor. Mike Heaven, a Delray Beach, Florida, native, was a defensive back who was expected to provide immediate help to a secondary that had aging safeties and struggling young cornerbacks. Likewise, Mike Prior was the Missouri Valley Conference career leader in interceptions as well as a former Baltimore Orioles draftee. He turned down a contract offer from the Los Angeles Dodgers to sign with Tampa Bay. Phil Freeman was the University of Arizona starting tailback until suffering a broken leg in 1982, but was projected as a wide receiver with what Bennett called "rare speed". Steve Calabria was the leading quarterback in Colgate history, with a strong arm and the ability to throw while rolling out. He claimed to already have signed a letter of agreement with Tampa Bay Bandits owner John F. Bassett, although it was unclear whether the Bandits would still be in existence, or whether they would be part of the USFL or part of a new spring league that Bassett was proposing. Calabria had been expected to be drafted as high as the fourth round, until rumors of his USFL agreement (which the Buccaneers were unaware of) began to circulate. By the time the ailing Bassett released Calabria from his contract, mini-camp was already over, and he was unprepared for preseason competition. Donald Igwebuike was a soccer player who tried football at the encouragement of his fellow Nigerian and Clemson teammate Obed Ariri, against whom he would now be competing for the kicking job. James Melka was a second-team All-Big Ten selection at linebacker who had been expected to be drafted much higher than the twelfth round.

The team followed the draft by signing 22 free agents, including Southern tight end Calvin Magee, LSU quarterback Alan Risher, and cornerback Irvin Phillips, who had been obtained via trade from the Los Angeles Raiders the previous year, but had been waived after failing a physical.

=== Steroid controversy ===
Guard Steve Courson was unable to participate in a team mini-camp due to a heart rate of 160. Attributing this to his heavy use of anabolic steroids, he quit using them, and detailed his experience in a Sports Illustrated article. He later stated that he did not believe that steroid use was really as rampant as he indicated in the article, in which he estimated that 75% of NFL linemen use steroids and 95% have tried them, and alleged that amphetamine use was also common. He said that he began using them in an attempt to gain strength, to avoid being dominated by larger defensive linemen in the NFL and at the University of South Carolina. He did not name any other players who used them, other than to say that Rocky Bleier had publicly admitted to it. Former trainer Tom Oxley estimated that the team had three to six steroid users in any given year, and that most were linemen. Oxley said that the team did not provide steroids to players, but that the team medical staff had almost prescribed them to Doug Williams to maintain weight when a 1978 broken jaw left him unable to eat. The article touched off controversy, as numerous players denied its allegations. Steroid use was at the time discouraged, though not prohibited, by the NFL.

=== Steve Young ===
The Los Angeles Express of the United States Football League had been operating without an owner since the previous fall, and speculation began to be raised in April that the team might be disbanded. The Buccaneers had acquired the NFL rights to Express quarterback Steve Young in a special draft held the previous spring. With the franchise struggling financially, agent Leigh Steinberg said that a delay in payments to Young's annuity voided his contract with the team, and USFL Commissioner Harry Usher granted Young permission to negotiate with an NFL team. Usher indicated that if Young were to change teams, his contract would need to be bought out. The Buccaneers expressed reservations, as they were unsure of Young's physical condition due to the beating he'd taken over the past year with the Express. Negotiations intensified toward the end of preseason, with the major sticking points being the $1.5 million repayment the USFL demanded on the remaining two years of Young's contract, and the requirement that Young clear USFL waivers. Steinberg was able to renegotiate the payment with the USFL, and Young signed a series of six one-year contracts with the Buccaneers on September 10. The financial details were not disclosed, but Steinberg said that Young's contract was comparable to those of John Elway, Warren Moon, and Bernie Kosar, who were all paid roughly $1 million per year. A star at BYU, Young would have been the first overall pick in the 1984 draft, but instead signed a 40-year (due to much of the payment being in the form of annuities), $43 million contract with the Express. Young had a sub-par 1985 season in Los Angeles, but was still able to complete over 50% of his passes while playing behind an injury-riddled offensive line. Bennett indicated that the team would be content to bring Young along slowly, and that he would serve as DeBerg's backup for at least the time being. The signing put an end to the team's interest in veteran quarterback Jim Zorn.

== Preseason ==
=== Defensive end problems ===
A soreness in Lee Roy Selmon's back that became apparent shortly after the Pro Bowl was originally thought to be a muscular injury, but turned out to be a herniated disc. With uncertainty over how to treat the injury or whether he would ever recover enough to be able to play again, Selmon postponed any decisions about his future plans and was lost to the team for the season. This meant that instead of Selmon and Ron Holmes playing as bookend pass-rushers, Holmes would now become Selmon's replacement. However, contract negotiations went so slowly that Holmes' agent, Leigh Steinberg, began to question whether the team had any intention of signing him, to the point that he asked negotiator Phil Krueger if they intended to trade him. Holmes was eventually signed after a two-week holdout, which caused him to miss much practice time. Selmon eventually chose non-surgical rehabilitation for his back, although he would consider the microsurgery recommended by the team, but only as a last resort.

The other two remaining original Buccaneers joined Selmon on the injured list during the preseason. Steve Wilson suffered a broken leg in a preseason game against the Washington Redskins, which left Redskins safety Curtis Jordan as the only remaining original Buccaneer active in the NFL. Safety Mark Cotney had earlier suffered two broken neck vertebrae while trying to tackle Gerald Riggs during an earlier game against the Falcons. Former Michigan Panthers All-USFL safety David Greenwood was signed to add depth after Cotney's injury, and wound up as the opening-day starter at strong safety.

=== Preseason play ===
Although preseason games had no importance in the standings, Bennett spoke of the importance of setting a winning tone for the season. Bennett had to abandon his plans of using a two-back offense, due to a lack of any quality running backs other than James Wilder Sr. With no second running back standing out in practice, he instead chose to use a single-back offense that would enable tight ends Jimmie Giles and Jerry Bell to be on the field at the same time. The team was not able to find a reliable backup to Wilder until the early-season signing of former Dallas Cowboys fullback Ron Springs. Problems with the pass defense were exposed in the first preseason game, in which the reserves turned a 20–0 lead into a 42–27 defeat. Bennett expressed concern over the lack of a pass rush, and the way that Steelers receivers were able to jump inside of Buccaneer defenders on slant routes. Pittsburgh third-string quarterback Scott Campbell connected twice with Weegie Thompson for touchdowns on such routes, once burning Anthony Washington for 34 yards. Ron Holmes debuted in the following week's loss to Atlanta, although the pass defense saw little improvement. The special teams performed well, but quarterback Jack Thompson struggled in his attempt to reclaim the starting job. The team's first win under Bennett came in New Orleans, the site of the franchise's first victory. The defense played better, while DeBerg led the team on two long touchdown drives. By the end of preseason, Bennett began to back off of his original assessment of the team as a playoff contender, with linebacker being the only position on the team he expressed confidence in. He was uncharacteristically silent following the final preseason game, a 20–7 loss to the Washington Redskins that was marked by a dismal offensive effort.

=== Preseason personnel moves ===
Gene Sanders, the offensive tackle who had shouldered much of the criticism for the offensive line's performance in recent seasons, was moved to Steve Courson's guard spot. Ken Kaplan took Sanders' place, with Courson still in contention for the starting guard spot. Needing depth in the secondary, the team traded former starting right tackle Kelly Thomas to the Redskins in return for Anthony Washington, the starting cornerback in Super Bowl XVIII; and sent an eighth-round draft pick to the Rams for safety Ivory Sully, conditional on his making the team. Sully was a Pro Bowl alternate as a special teams player, but had been unable to break into the starting lineup, playing behind Nolan Cromwell and Johnnie Johnson. He became one of the team's opening-day starters, originally slated at strong safety, but moved over to free safety with the signing of David Greenwood. Jay Carroll, a tight end who had played in all 16 games as a rookie in 1984, announced his retirement from football, as did backup fullback Scott Dierking.

Fourth-round draft pick Mike Heaven, who was having difficulty with the transition to strong safety, was released with the second round of cuts. The cut to sixty players saw Cedric Brown, the team's all-time leader in interceptions, released. Numerous players who had been expected to contend, or even to have the inside track for starting jobs, were released at the end of preseason. These included team kicking leader Obed Ariri, beaten out by childhood friend Donald Igwebuike, to whom Ariri had introduced the sport of football; defensive end Byron Braggs, who had been considered a candidate for the starting right defensive end spot until his lack of pass rush became a liability; preseason starters Glenn Bujnoch and Danny Spradlin; Fred Acorn, a third-round selection the previous year who had started some late-season games; and Anthony Washington, a speedy and experienced player who nonetheless failed to live up to expectations. Jack Thompson, the previous season's opening-day starting quarterback, and starting safety Beasley Reece were also released.

== Regular season ==
Bennett said that, given the Buccaneers' record over the past two seasons, it was "automatically a rebuilding year". The squad began play as a young team, with 17 players who had not been there the previous year, and ten of the previous year's opening-day starters out of the starting lineup. The season began with a second-half collapse in a loss to the Chicago Bears, in which Bennett noted a lack of concentration and attention to detail. He admitted to being unable to explain the reason for the large number of errors, which in the first two games alone included 20 penalties, 4 interceptions (two returned for touchdowns), 3 fumbles, 2 blocked punts (one returned for a touchdown), and a missed extra-point and field goal attempt. Special teams coach Howard Tippett pointed out that the Buccaneers weren't making any mistakes that other teams didn't, but that the Buccaneer mistakes tended to get magnified and repeated. Linebacker Chris Washington attributed the defense's problems to a young, inexperienced team trying to learn a new system. Even as the losses mounted, opponents reported surprise, both from studying game films and playing the team on the field, at the Buccaneers' record. The Buccaneers frequently held halftime leads and lost by a touchdown or less; through the first 9 games, they were outscored 77–17 in the third quarter. In one game, Jimmie Giles was congratulated despite having turned over the ball by fumbling, because the 44-yard reception that preceded the fumble was a rare example of a player making something happen in the third quarter.

=== Off-field problems ===
The early season was marked by off-the-field problems with players. Hugh Green had told Jeff Davis on the first day of practice that the new defense wasn't going to work. As the season began, he became critical of the defensive schemes, saying that they were not "molded to the individual talents of the players", and that he was just "trying to survive this season". He then walked out of camp for a day. It came to light that this had occurred regularly over the past four seasons, but that John McKay had kept the matter away from the press. Seeing Green's attitude as a negative influence on the team, and unsure of why Green was unhappy, Bennett traded him to the Miami Dolphins for their 1986 first-round draft choice, and the second-round pick obtained from Minnesota in the Anthony Carter trade. Team owner Hugh Culverhouse also required Green to repay $335,000 of the signing bonus from his 1984 two-year contract, which was believed to be the first such buyout in NFL history. The trade was thought to be the Dolphins' biggest-ever trade for a defensive player, with Green considered to be second-only to Lawrence Taylor as an NFL linebacker. Green's disgruntlement was attributed to a combination of the team's losing record, and the new defensive scheme that did not give him the opportunity to freelance. The trade put Keith Browner back into the starting lineup, despite Bennett's criticism of his lack of effort.

Meanwhile, former Dallas Cowboys fullback Ron Springs was offered a contract on the very day that a Dallas police officer testified that she believed him to have been on drugs the night that he was arrested for aggravated assault on a police officer at a Dallas-area topless nightclub. He was eventually sentenced on the reduced charge of resisting arrest, following a trial marked by character testimony from Springs' teammates. Shortly afterward, it was revealed that Springs was one of several Cowboys players under investigation by the NFL and the FBI, for suspicion of shaving points in return for cocaine. The FBI eventually concluded that there was no basis to the allegations.

=== Quarterback controversy ===
As the loss column incremented, fans began to clamor for Steve Young. Bennett insisted that he would not play Young until he felt that he was ready, and at one point was booed for inserting Alan Risher into a game as Steve DeBerg's replacement. While DeBerg's statistics were not bad, he had difficulty completing long passes, even though receivers Kevin House and Gerald Carter had combined for the third-most catches of any receiving duo in the NFL the previous year. Although Bennett insisted that the timing was unrelated, Young's first start was announced one day after one of the team's worst-ever losses, a 62–28 blowout against the New York Jets. Bennett said that he felt comfortable enough with Young's progress to give him the start, but Young admitted to having taken only "10 or 12" snaps in practice, and had never run any of the Buccaneers' plays. Starting behind an injury-battered offensive line against a blitzing Detroit Lions team, Young struggled for three quarters before rallying the team for a victory. Although Young's statistics were not especially impressive, Bennett noted that he had little practice time and no training camp, and that he performed well enough through his first three starts that Bennett would consider modifying the next season's offense to take better advantage of Young's abilities.

=== Snow Bowl ===
The Snow Bowl was played on December 1, 1985, against the Green Bay Packers at Lambeau Field in Green Bay, Wisconsin. The game was played in a record snowfall, with a foot of snow on the field, and four more inches falling during the game. It was nearly delayed, as the tarp protecting the field was frozen to the ground, and could not be removed until shortly before kickoff. The 35-mph wind produced a wind-chill factor of 0 °F or −17.8 °C. According to an employee who had been to every Packer home game in their history, it was the worst weather ever at Lambeau Field. The attendance of 19,856, and the 36,586 unused tickets, were the lowest in both Buccaneer and Lambeau Field history. The Packers gained 512 yards to the Buccaneers' 65, as Tampa Bay lost their 18th consecutive road game.

Speaking of the team's future plans after the season, Bennett would not immediately say how the next draft’s first-round pick would be spent, but offered that he'd seen enough of the team's one-back offense that featured Wilder and no supporting players. John McKay announced that he would step down as team president, though he would maintain a part-time advisory role with the team.

== Roster ==
Tampa Bay Buccaneers 1985 roster
**Quarterbacks**: 17 **Steve DeBerg**; 7 Alan Risher; 8 **Steve Young**; **Running backs**: 46 **Adger Armstrong**; 38 George Peoples; 20 Ron Springs; 32 **James Wilder**; **Wide receivers**: 83 Theo Bell; 87 **Gerald Carter**; 89 **Kevin House**; 84 David Verser; **Tight ends**: 80 K. D. Dunn; 88 **Jimmie Giles**; 86 **Calvin Magee**; 85 Mark Witte	**Offensive linemen**: 72 **Steve Courson** LG; 62 **Sean Farrell** RG; 60 **Randy Grimes** C; 73 **Ron Heller** RT; 79 Ken Kaplan LS/T; 68 **Rick Mallory** RG; 64 Joe Shearin G/C; 50 Steve Wilson T/C; 66 **George Yarno** LT; **Defensive linemen**: 78 **John Cannon** LDE; 90 **Ron Holmes** RDE; 75 Chris Lindstrom DE; 76 **David Logan** NT; 67 Karl Morgan NT; 71 Mark Studaway DE	**Linebackers**: 57 **Keith Browner** LOLB; 58 **Jeff Davis** LILB; 56 **Cecil Johnson** RILB; 55 Dennis Johnson ILB; 54 **Ervin Randle** LOLB; 51 **Chris Washington** LOLB/ROLB; **Defensive backs**: 23 **Jeremiah Castille** LCB; 31 **Craig Curry** SS; 26 Ricky Easmon CB; 30 **David Greenwood** SS; 21 **John Holt** RCB; 24 Mike Prior FS; 44 **Ivory Sully** FS; **Special teams**: 5 Frank Garcia P; 1 Donald Igwebuike K	**Reserve lists**: 45 Corwyn Aldredge TE (IR); 82 **Jerry Bell** TE (IR); 52 **Scot Brantley** LB (IR); 29 Leon Bright RB (IR); 33 Mark Cotney S (IR); 47 Paul Dombroski S (IR); 65 Don Fielder DE (IR); 81 Phil Freeman WR (IR); -- John Janata T (IR); 59 Larry Kubin LB (IR); 74 Gene Sanders T (IR); -- Tony Wroten TE (IR); rookies in italics **Starters in boldface**

== Coaching staff ==
Tampa Bay Buccaneers 1985 coaching staff
Front office: Owner – Hugh Culverhouse; Director of player personnel – Jim Gruden; Head coaches: Head coach – Leeman Bennett; Offensive coaches: Offensive Coordinator/Quarterbacks- Jimmy Raye; Offensive line – Kim Helton; Receivers – Larry Seiple; Running backs – Vic Rapp; Offensive/Film Assistant – Greg Brown	Defensive coaches: Defensive coordinator – Doug Shively; Defensive line – Don Lawrence; Linebackers/Special Teams – Howard Tippett; Defensive backs – Dick Roach; Strength – Joe Diange

== Schedule ==
Week	Date	Opponent	Result	Record	Venue	Attendance
1	September 8	at **Chicago Bears**	**L** 38–28	0–1	Soldier Field	57,828
2	September 15	**Minnesota Vikings**	**L** 31–16	0–2	Tampa Stadium	46,188
3	September 22	at New Orleans Saints	**L** 20–13	0–3	Louisiana Superdome	45,320
4	September 29	at **Detroit Lions**	**L** 30–9	0–4	Pontiac Silverdome	45,023
5	October 6	**Chicago Bears**	**L** 27–19	0–5	Tampa Stadium	51,795
6	October 13	Los Angeles Rams	**L** 31–27	0–6	Tampa Stadium	39,607
7	October 20	at Miami Dolphins	**L** 41–38	0–7	Orange Bowl	62,335
8	October 27	New England Patriots	**L** 32–14	0–8	Tampa Stadium	34,661
9	November 3	at New York Giants	**L** 22–20	0–9	Giants Stadium	72,031
10	November 10	St. Louis Cardinals	**W** 16–0	1–9	Tampa Stadium	34,736
11	November 17	at New York Jets	**L** 62–28	1–10	Giants Stadium	65,344
12	November 24	**Detroit Lions**	**W** 19–16_{(OT)}	2–10	Tampa Stadium	43,471
13	December 1	at **Green Bay Packers**	**L** 21–0	2–11	Lambeau Field	19,856
14	December 8	at **Minnesota Vikings**	**L** 26–7	2–12	Hubert H. Humphrey Metrodome	51,593
15	December 15	Indianapolis Colts	**L** 31–23	2–13	Tampa Stadium	25,577
16	December 22	**Green Bay Packers**	**L** 20–17	2–14	Tampa Stadium	33,992
Notes: Division opponents in **bold** text

=== Standings ===
NFC Central
	W	L	T	PCT	DIV	CONF	PF	PA	STK
^{(1)} Chicago Bears	15	1	0	.938	8–0	12–0	456	198	W3
Green Bay Packers	8	8	0	.500	6–2	8–4	337	355	W2
Minnesota Vikings	7	9	0	.438	3–5	5–9	346	359	L2
Detroit Lions	7	9	0	.438	2–6	5–7	307	366	L3
Tampa Bay Buccaneers	2	14	0	.125	1–7	2–10	294	448	L4

== Game summaries ==
=== Week 1: at Chicago Bears ===
	1	2	3	4	Total
Buccaneers	14	14	0	0	28
Bears	7	10	14	7	38

Sep. 8, 1985 at Soldier Field, Chicago, Illinois

The Buccaneers scored a team-record 28 first-half points against the Bears' defense, which had been ranked first in the league the previous season. James Wilder's 105 first-half rushing yards was higher than the average the 1984 Bears had allowed per game. The Bears got no sacks, and Steve DeBerg was able to complete eight passes for three touchdowns, repeatedly able to fool the Bears with fake handoffs. After halftime adjustments, the Bears held the Buccaneers scoreless for the remainder of the game, while scoring three touchdowns to take the lead. The turning point of the game was considered by Bennett to be a DeBerg pass that was deflected by Richard Dent, and returned by Leslie Frazier for a touchdown. The Bears clinched the game when a blocked punt led to a 1-yard Jim McMahon touchdown run. Phil Freeman returned a kickoff 58 yards, the longest in Buccaneer history. Walter Payton rushed for 120 yards, his 64th career 100-yard rushing game. On-field temperatures were recorded at 121 degrees.

=== Week 2: vs Minnesota Vikings ===
	1	2	3	4	Total
Vikings	7	10	7	7	31
Buccaneers	0	3	7	6	16

Sep. 15, 1985 at Tampa Stadium, Tampa, Florida

The Minnesota Vikings took advantage of Buccaneer turnovers; intercepting Steve DeBerg twice, recovering two James Wilder fumbles, and blocking a punt. Joey Browner returned one of the interceptions for a touchdown, and the blocked punt set up a 1-yard Alfred Anderson touchdown run. Wilder rushed for 113 yards and a touchdown, while catching 13 passes for 71 yards.

=== Week 3: at New Orleans Saints ===
	1	2	3	4	Total
Buccaneers	0	6	0	7	13
Saints	7	10	3	0	20

Sep 22, 1985 at the Louisiana Superdome, New Orleans, Louisiana

Preparing for a matchup between two 0–2 teams, a New Orleans radio station invited a voodoo priestess to hold an on-air ritual to remove the hex that had prevented the team from having a winning season in any of its 18 years. Three New Orleans offensive linemen suffered injuries in a 12-minute span, but Dave Wilson was still able to pass for 246 yards, and touchdowns to tight ends Hoby Brenner and Larry Hardy. Morten Andersen contributed two field goals, while Terry Hoage forced a James Wilder fumble and intercepted a Steve DeBerg pass. Wilder's 114 yards left him as the NFL's leading rusher, and through three games the only Buccaneer running back with a carry.

=== Week 4: at Detroit Lions ===
	1	2	3	4	Total
Buccaneers	3	3	3	0	9
Lions	0	10	6	14	30

Sep. 29, 1985 at the Pontiac Silverdome, Pontiac, Michigan

The Buccaneers were held without a touchdown for the first time in 21 games, despite two first-and-goal situations inside the Lions' five-yard line. The first resulted in a field goal which gave them only their second lead of the season. The Buccaneers committed three fumbles, while allowing 315 yards to the Lions' 27th-ranked offense. Buccaneer pass-rushers got four sacks, almost as many as their total in the first three games, but the secondary was victimized for numerous big plays. Karl Morgan forced Eric Hipple to fumble on one of his two sacks, while Dave Logan and Hugh Green also got to Hipple. Mark Nichols beat Jeremiah Castille twice for touchdowns.

=== Week 5: vs Chicago Bears ===
	1	2	3	4	Total
Bears	0	3	10	14	27
Buccaneers	0	12	0	7	19

Oct 6, 1985, at Tampa Stadium, Tampa, Florida

The Buccaneers were unable to obtain a victory over the Chicago Bears, despite holding a lead in a dominant first half against what was widely considered to be the best team in football, and lackluster games from Jim McMahon and the Bears' defense. The Bears held James Wilder to 29 yards, preventing him from tying an NFL record by joining O. J. Simpson and Earl Campbell as the only backs with seven consecutive 100-yard rushing games. In doing so, they allowed Steve DeBerg to have his best passing day as a Buccaneer, with 346 yards. Jimmie Giles and Kevin House both had over 100 yards receiving. Giles' 112 yards came on 7 catches, his career high. The game was sealed with a daring, late-game bomb to Willie Gault that set up a 9-yard Walter Payton touchdown run. Payton scored his 100th and 101st touchdowns, making him the sixth NFL player to reach the 100-touchdown mark. It was the Bears' sixth consecutive victory over Tampa Bay.

=== Week 6: vs Los Angeles Rams ===
	1	2	3	4	Total
Rams	0	14	10	7	31
Buccaneers	7	13	0	7	27

Oct. 13, 1985 at Tampa Stadium, Tampa, Florida

For the second consecutive week, the Buccaneers lost, despite holding a halftime lead against an unbeaten team. The Buccaneers' defense played well in their first game without Hugh Green, and they recovered three Ram fumbles in the first half. The Rams also committed eight first-half penalties. In the second half, LeRoy Irvin and Carl Ekern returned interceptions for touchdowns to edge past the Buccaneers. DeBerg's four interceptions gave him a season total of 13, the most in the NFL.

=== Week 7: at Miami Dolphins ===
	1	2	3	4	Total
Buccaneers	0	14	7	17	38
Dolphins	14	10	14	3	41

Oct. 20, 1985 at the Orange Bowl, Miami, Florida

For the third week in a row, the Buccaneers suffered a close loss to one of the NFL's best teams. This time, it was a final-period rally in which the Buccaneers outscored the Dolphins 17–3. Don Shula said of Jimmie Giles, "I can't remember any other tight end dominating us that way", after Giles caught 7 passes for 116 yards and 4 touchdowns against the Dolphins' man-to-man coverage. Giles' 4 touchdowns and 24 points scored remain, as of 2010, the all-time Tampa Bay records. James Wilder evaded Hugh Green on Tampa Bay's first touchdown, a 10-yard run. Green reported playing "the worst game of my career" and feeling lost in Miami's defensive scheme, although he produced the Dolphins' only interception of the day. With starting linebackers Jeff Davis and Scot Brantley out with injuries, and Green no longer with the team, the Buccaneers were defenseless against the Dolphins' attack. Fuad Reveiz scored the winning field goal with 6 seconds remaining. The loss, combined with an Atlanta Falcons victory, left the Buccaneers as the league's only winless team at 0–7.

=== Week 8: vs New England Patriots ===
	1	2	3	4	Total
Patriots	0	13	3	16	32
Buccaneers	14	0	0	0	14

Oct 27, 1985, at Tampa Stadium, Tampa, Florida

The Buccaneers took a 14–0 lead on a 1-yard James Wilder run, but barely crossed midfield for the rest of the game. Wilder's touchdown was his 33rd and gave him 198 career points, which made him the franchise scoring leader ahead of Bill Capece, with 196. Injuries were again a problem, with starting linebackers Brantley and Davis leaving the game for the second week in a row, along with starting tackle George Yarno and kick returner Leon Bright. Bright's knee injury required surgery. Injured guard Sean Farrell did not play at all. The game eliminated the Buccaneers from the NFC Central Division race, and had the second-smallest home attendance in team history, 34,661.

=== Week 9: at New York Giants ===
	1	2	3	4	Total
Buccaneers	3	10	0	7	20
Giants	3	3	10	6	22

Nov. 3, 1985 at Giants Stadium, East Rutherford, New Jersey

Freshly signed kicker Eric Schubert kicked five field goals to help the highly favored New York Giants to edge past the Buccaneers. Four times, the Giants had possession of the ball in the red zone, but were held to field goals. Heavy Buccaneer blitzes failed to stop Joe Morris from rushing for 132 yards, making Morris the first Giant in two years to have consecutive 100-yard games. A last-minute rally appeared to have brought the Buccaneers in position to attempt a game-winning field goal, but a holding penalty on Sean Farrell erased Adger Armstrong's reception at the Giants' 38-yard line, and Terry Kinard intercepted a DeBerg pass on the next play. Farrell criticized the call at the time, but Bennett later confirmed that it was correct, although he questioned why the only holding penalty of the entire game would be called in that situation. Craig Curry started at safety, leaving David Greenwood on the bench. U-back (a second tight end position) Jerry Bell suffered a season-ending knee injury. His backup, Calvin Magee, also went out with an injured knee, although it didn't require immediate surgery.

=== Week 10: vs. St. Louis Cardinals ===
	1	2	3	4	Total
Cardinals	0	0	0	0	0
Buccaneers	3	7	0	6	16

Nov. 10, 1985 at Tampa Stadium, Tampa, Florida

Donald Igwebuike kicked three field goals as the Buccaneers recorded their first victory under Leeman Bennett. James Wilder rushed for 120 yards, while Steve DeBerg passed for 196 yards and a touchdown to Adger Armstrong. The Cardinals' offense was ineffective without injured starters Ottis Anderson and Roy Green. It was the Buccaneers' first shutout since their division-clinching 3–0 victory over the Kansas City Chiefs on Dec. 16, 1979. The game was attended by a crowd of 34,736, the third-smallest in team history. Players afterward expressed relief, rather than joy, at getting their first win. Igwebuike, Wilder, and David Logan were presented with game balls after the game, the first ever awarded by the Buccaneers.

=== Week 11: at New York Jets ===
	1	2	3	4	Total
Buccaneers	14	7	7	0	28
Jets	17	24	14	7	62

Nov. 17, 1985 at Giants Stadium, East Rutherford, New Jersey

After the Buccaneers took a 14–0 lead on a recovery of a Ken O'Brien fumble and Steve DeBerg touchdown passes to Kevin House and Calvin Magee, the Jets' offense caught fire, scoring a team-record 62 points. Players afterward denied that they were thinking about revenge for the previous season's "Buc Flop" incident, in which James Wilder was approaching an NFL record, and the Buccaneer defense allowed the Jets to score a touchdown in an attempt to get the ball back so that Wilder could get more carries. O'Brien passed for 367 yards and 5 touchdowns, with Al Toon catching 6 of his passes for 133 yards. Mickey Shuler tied a Jets record with three touchdown receptions. Jeremiah Castille intercepted an O'Brien pass, but then fumbled it back to Wesley Walker.

=== Week 12: vs Detroit Lions ===
	1	2	3	4	OT	Total
Lions	0	7	6	3	0	16
Buccaneers	3	3	0	10	3	19

Nov 24, 1985 at Tampa Stadium, Tampa, Florida

Donald Igwebuike kicked a field goal to force overtime with a minute remaining in regulation, and then kicked another with 2:29 remaining in overtime to secure the victory in Steve Young's NFL debut. The Buccaneers were aided by the decision of Lions coach Don Rogers, who as a former college coach in the NFL for the first time had no experience with overtime, to punt on fourth-and-inches from the 50-yard line in hopes that Young's inexperience would give the Lions the ball back with good field position. The Lions blamed the 80-degree heat, and crowd noise that drowned out several audibles, for a series of fourth-quarter breakdowns that allowed the Buccaneers to erase a 16–6 deficit. Fatigued Lions defenders allowed James Wilder to gain 42 yards on his last 9 carries. Young's scrambling style gained zero net passing yards through the first three-quarters, but when he switched to a dropback style of passing in the fourth quarter, he began to find success completing long passes. The Buccaneers scored on a 6-yard Wilder run, while the defense held the Lions scoreless, and Young drove the team into field goal range twice. Young became the first Buccaneer quarterback to win in his first start.

=== Week 13: at Green Bay Packers ===
	1	2	3	4	Total
Buccaneers	0	0	0	0	0
Packers	0	7	7	7	21

Dec 1, 1985 at Lambeau Field, Green Bay, Wisconsin

The Buccaneers' 65 net yards and their average gain of 1.6 yards per play were both team lows. It was the lowest offensive total by any Packers opponent since a game against the Atlanta Falcons on Oct 1, 1967. Having difficulty finding open receivers, Steve Young ran 7 times for 31 yards, and was sacked 5 times for 42 yards. He completed no passes longer than 10 yards, and reported trouble keeping a grip on the ball. James Wilder was held to 23 yards rushing. Anticipating bad weather, the Packers prepared for the game by moving their practices outdoors during the week. Several Buccaneers reported loss of feeling in their extremities. Lynn Dickey passed for 299 yards and a touchdown, James Lofton caught passes for 106 yards, Eddie Lee Ivery rushed for 109 yards, and Gerry Ellis rushed for 101 yards and a touchdown. Alphonso Carreker got four of the Packers' five sacks. It was the Buccaneers' 18th consecutive road loss, tying the 2nd-longest such streak in NFL history, and their 25th consecutive road loss in an outdoor stadium.

=== Week 14: at Minnesota Vikings ===
	1	2	3	4	Total
Buccaneers	0	0	7	0	7
Vikings	6	10	3	7	26

Dec 8, 1985 at Hubert H. Humphrey Metrodome, Minneapolis, Minnesota

An attempted rally from a 19–0 deficit died when a holding penalty called back a Kevin House pass reception at the Vikings' 3-yard line. The Buccaneers committed 10 penalties in all, for a total of 76 yards. In a 1:42 stretch of the third quarter, the two teams combined for five turnovers in nine plays, with James Wilder afterward fumbling on his next possession. Wilder became the first Buccaneer to pass the 4,000-yard rushing mark, but could not savor it, due to the injury-filled loss. Kick returner Phil Freeman broke a wrist and linebacker Dennis Johnson bruised a shoulder, both while making tackles. Craig Curry suffered an eye injury, and Scot Brantley injured a shoulder.

=== Week 15: vs Indianapolis Colts ===
	1	2	3	4	Total
Colts	7	10	0	14	31
Buccaneers	7	10	0	6	23

Dec 15, 1985 at Tampa Stadium, Tampa, Florida

Steve Young threw for a career-high 251 yards, but threw two late-game interceptions that ended the team's chances for a rally. The game opened with a 59-yard pass to Kevin House, the team's longest pass in 30 games. The attendance of 25,577 shattered the team's previous record-low attendance, and the 17,419 no-shows were also a record. The 55-degree weather was also a record, the coldest-ever for a game in Tampa Stadium. In only their fourth win of the season, the Colts rushed for 257 yards, and scored 14 fourth-quarter points to come from behind for the win. Along with the interceptions, they were aided by two fourth-quarter fumbles. Randy McMillan led Colts rushers, with 108 yards. George Wonsley rushed for two touchdowns, and Albert Bentley one. The loss assured the Buccaneers of the following year's first-overall draft pick, as the strength of schedule gave the Buccaneers the advantage over the Atlanta Falcons, the only other team that could potentially win as few as 3 games. (The Buffalo Bills would finish with two wins, but their first-round pick had already been traded away and spent on Bernie Kosar in a supplemental draft the previous season, leaving the 1986 NFL draft with only 27 first-round picks). Of his defense's performance, Bennett could only say, "That team shouldn't have scored 31 points on us".

=== Week 16: vs Green Bay Packers ===
	1	2	3	4	Total
Packers	7	3	3	7	20
Buccaneers	3	7	0	7	17

Dec 22, 1985 at Tampa Stadium, Tampa, Florida

Thanks to a missed Donald Igwebuike field goal attempt late in the fourth quarter, the Packers edged Tampa Bay in a game full of turnovers and errors. David Greenwood fumbled the ball back to the Packers on a return of an intercepted Jim Zorn pass, a John Holt fumble recovery was called back due to an offside penalty, and Calvin Magee fumbled the ball back to the Packers on the first play following a Jeremiah Castille interception. Gerry Ellis fumbled the second-half kickoff for the Packers. The Buccaneers' first touchdown was set up by a Mark Murphy pass interference penalty in the end zone. With a glut of aging quarterbacks, the Packers used the fourth quarter to get a look at Randy Wright, who led the team to their winning points.

Wide receiver Theo Bell, noted for his team leadership and for his contributions to the community, retired from a 10-year NFL career following the game.

== Awards and records ==
=== Postseason honors ===
Jimmie Giles, Pro Bowl
James Wilder, Pro Bowl alternate
James Wilder, team Most Valuable Player
Theo Bell, the NFL Alumni Tampa Bay Buccaneers Chapter Ricky Bell Award for contributions on and off the field

=== Team and individual records ===
Most team records set this season tended to be either of the individual variety, or related to the Nov. 17 game against the New York Jets:

- James Wilder, most season 100-yard rushing games (5, tied his own 1984 mark, broken by Carnell Williams in 2006)
- James Wilder, most team single-game pass receptions and pass receptions by a running back (13 vs. Minnesota 9/15, since tied by Earnest Graham at Detroit 10/21/07)
- Jimmie Giles, most team single-game touchdowns (4 at Miami 10/20)
- Jimmie Giles, most team single-game points scored (24 at Miami)
- Jimmie Giles, most team single-game receiving yards by a tight end (134 vs. St. Louis 11/10, broken by Calvin Magee at Chicago 12/7/86)
- Donald Igwebuike, longest team field goal attempt (62 yards vs. Minnesota 9/15, and New Orleans 9/22; since tied by Matt Bryant and Martin Gramatica)
- Donald Igwebuike, most season field goals (22, since broken numerous times)
- Donald Igwebuike, most season points scored (96, since broken numerous times)
- David Greenwood, most rookie interceptions (5, tied by Donnie Abraham in 1996)
- Phil Freeman, most team single-season kickoff returns (48)
- Most team kickoff returns (80)
- Most single-game kickoff returns (9 vs. New York Jets 11/17, tied vs. Minnesota 10/30/94)
- Most passing touchdowns (22, tied 1984 mark, broken in 1987)
- Best team single-game average gain per-play (8.35 yards vs. Miami 10/20, broken vs. Minnesota 10/29/00)
- Most single-half points scored (28 vs Chicago on 9/8, broken vs. Chicago on 12/22/96)
- Best time of possession (41:21 vs. Detroit 11/24 in OT, 31:40 in regulation; broken vs. Washington 12/4/94)
- Most penalty first downs, season (34)
- Most points allowed (62 at New York Jets 11/17)
- Most touchdowns allowed (8 at New York Jets, tied at Cincinnati 10/29/89)
- Most single-game yards allowed (581 at New York Jets)
- Most single-game first downs allowed (35 at New York Jets)
- Most touchdown passes by an opponent (5 by Ken O'Brien, New York Jets 11/17, tied by three others)
- Most field goals by an opponent (5 by Eric Schubert, New York Giants 11/3, since tied twice)
- Best opponent punting average (54.0 by Maury Buford of Chicago 10/6, broken by Reggie Roby 12/4/94)
- Most points, two teams (90 at New York Jets, 62–28; broke record of 79 set one month earlier vs. Miami, 41–38)
- Most rushing yards, two teams (414 vs. Indianapolis 12/15; Indianapolis 257, T.B. 157; broken vs. Atlanta 9/28/86)
- Most first downs, two teams (54 vs. Miami 10/20; Miami 30, T.B. 24)
