= Lynne Thomas =

Lynne Thomas may refer to:

- Lynne Thomas (cricketer)
- Lynne M. Thomas, American librarian
- Lynn Thomas, American football player
