= Leeman Bennett =

American football player and coach (born 1938)

Personal information
- Born: June 20, 1938 (age 88); Paducah, Kentucky, U.S.

Career information
- College: Kentucky (1957–1960)

Career history
- Kentucky (1961–1962) Assistant coach; Kentucky (1965) Assistant coach; Pittsburgh (1966) Assistant coach; Cincinnati (1967) Running backs coach; Cincinnati (1968) Offensive coordinator; Navy (1969) Offensive coordinator; St. Louis Cardinals (1970–1971) Offensive backs coach; Detroit Lions (1972) Offensive backs coach; Los Angeles Rams (1973–1976) Wide receivers coach; Atlanta Falcons (1977–1982) Head coach; Tampa Bay Buccaneers (1985–1986) Head coach

Head coaching record
- Regular season: NFL: 50–69 (.420)
- Postseason: NFL: 1–3 (.250)
- Career: NFL: 51–72 (.415)
- Coaching profile at Pro Football Reference

Conner Leeman Bennett (born June 20, 1938) is an American former football coach who served at both the collegiate and professional levels, but is best remembered as head coach of the National Football League (NFL)'s Atlanta Falcons and Tampa Bay Buccaneers.

== Early life ==
A native of Paducah, Kentucky, Bennett played college football for the Kentucky Wildcats at both quarterback and defensive back under head coach Blanton Collier for three seasons beginning in 1958. During Collier's final season with the Wildcats in 1961, Bennett began his coaching career by serving as an assistant coach with the team.

== Coaching career ==
=== College ===
Bennett continued the following year under new head coach Charlie Bradshaw, then served in the military the next two years. In his first full year as a coach, Bennett was on the staff for Bradshaw's infamous first team that was known as the Thin Thirty. He resumed his career at Kentucky in 1965, then moved on to Pittsburgh the following year. After only one season, Bennett accepted the running backs coaching position under Homer Rice at Cincinnati in 1967, then was promoted to offensive coordinator the following season.

On February 7, 1969, Bennett assumed similar duties at the U.S. Naval Academy under Rick Forzano, but left on March 13, 1970, to become running backs coach with the NFL's St. Louis Cardinals. Bennett survived a coaching change after his first season, but left after the Cardinals' 1971 season to become an assistant with the Detroit Lions.

=== NFL ===
After Chuck Knox was hired as head coach of the Los Angeles Rams in January 1973, he hired Bennett as the team's receivers coach. Over the next four years, the team's high-powered offense helped them reach three NFC Championship Games, but never made a Super Bowl. Bennett became a head coach being hired by the Falcons on February 3, 1977.

During his first season in Atlanta, Bennett's defense became known as the "Grits Blitz" for its ferocious style and allowing just 129 points, a record for a 14-game season. The overall improvement of the team became evident the following season, when the Falcons defeated the Philadelphia Eagles in the NFC Wild Card game, then put up a strong fight against the defending Super Bowl champion Dallas Cowboys.

After the team endured a losing season in 1979, Bennett led the team to its first division title in and a then-team record 12 wins in 1980. However, a fourth quarter collapse against the Cowboys in the first round of the playoffs abruptly ended the season.

While another losing record followed in 1981, the team lost its final three games, dashing hopes of a playoff return. However, the strike-shortened 1982 NFL season saw Bennett's team finish 5–4, reaching the postseason in the expanded playoffs, losing the first-round game to the Minnesota Vikings. A late season slump, coupled with the playoff losses and overall inconsistency, resulted in Bennett being fired on January 14, 1983; he noted his surprise at being fired while doing the joint press conference with team owner Rankin Smith. He was the first coach in Falcons history to depart with a winning record, going 47–44 (including a 1–3 record in the playoffs). The next coach to finish with a winning record was Jim Mora in 2006 (26–22).

For the next two years, Bennett sold recreational vehicles before the Tampa Bay Buccaneers hired him on January 23, 1985, replacing the retiring John McKay. However, Bennett's previous success did not come with him to Tampa Bay, with consecutive 2–14 finishes. On December 29, 1986, he was fired by team owner Hugh Culverhouse. His .125 winning percentage as head coach is still the worst in team history.

== Life after football ==
Bennett then returned to Atlanta, where he purchased a car dealership and was named chairman of the selection committee for the Peach Bowl. In 1991, Bennett sold the dealership and was hired as director of development for the Greater Atlanta Christian School, where his two sons had attended. Eight years later, he co-founded the First National Bank of John's Creek in Alpharetta, Georgia, later serving as its director. Bennett also contributed to Falcons radio shows. He would be inducted into the Atlanta Sports Hall of Fame in 2015. In 2020, Bennett was inducted into the Kentucky Pro Football Hall of Fame.

While still handling his bowl game duties, Bennett is mostly retired, spending much of his free time golfing and hunting. He also spends his time with his family.

== Head coaching record ==
| Team | Year | Regular season | | | | Postseason | | | |
| Team | Year | Won | Lost | Win % | Finish | Won | Lost | Win % | Result |
|---|---|---|---|---|---|---|---|---|---|
| ATL | 1977 | 7 | 7 | .500 | 2nd in NFC West | | | | |
| ATL | 1978 | 9 | 7 | .563 | 2nd in NFC West | 1 | 1 | .500 | Lost to Dallas Cowboys in NFC Divisional Playoffs |
| ATL | 1979 | 6 | 10 | .375 | 3rd in NFC West | | | | |
| ATL | 1980 | 12 | 4 | .750 | 1st in NFC West | 0 | 1 | .000 | Lost to Dallas Cowboys in NFC Divisional Playoffs |
| ATL | 1981 | 7 | 9 | .438 | 2nd in NFC West | | | | |
| ATL | 1982 | 5 | 4 | .556 | 5th in NFC | 0 | 1 | .000 | Lost to Minnesota Vikings in NFC First Round |
| ATL total | | 46 | 41 | .529 | | 1 | 3 | .250 | |
| TB | 1985 | 2 | 14 | .125 | 5th in NFC Central | | | | |
| TB | 1986 | 2 | 14 | .125 | 5th in NFC Central | | | | |
| TB total | | 4 | 28 | .125 | | | | | |
| Total | | 50 | 69 | .420 | | 1 | 3 | .250 | |
