= Gene Branton =

American football player (born 1960)

No. 80
- Position: Wide receiver

Personal information
- Born: November 23, 1960 (age 65); Tampa, Florida, U.S.
- Listed height: 6 ft 4 in (1.93 m)
- Listed weight: 223 lb (101 kg)

Career information
- High school: C. Leon King (Tampa)
- College: Texas Southern
- NFL draft: 1983: 6th round, 148th overall pick

Career history
- Tampa Bay Buccaneers (1983, 1985); Los Angeles Raiders (1986–1988)

Career NFL statistics
- Games played: 4
- Stats at Pro Football Reference

Rheugene James "Gene" Branton (born November 23, 1960) is an American former professional football player who was a wide receiver for the Tampa Bay Buccaneers of the National Football League (NFL) in 1983 and 1985. He played college football for the Texas Southern Tigers.
