= Rich Diana =

American football player (born 1960)

No. 33
- Position: Running back

Personal information
- Born: September 6, 1960 (age 66); Hamden, Connecticut, U.S.
- Listed height: 5 ft 9 in (1.75 m)
- Listed weight: 220 lb (100 kg)

Career information
- High school: Hamden
- College: Yale
- NFL draft: 1982: 5th round, 136th overall pick

Career history
- Miami Dolphins (1982)

Awards and highlights
- 2× First-team All-East (1980, 1981)

Career NFL statistics
- Rushing yards: 31
- Rushing average: 3.9
- Receptions: 2
- Receiving yards: 21
- Stats at Pro Football Reference

Richard Diana (born September 6, 1960) is an American former professional football player who was a running back for the Miami Dolphins of the National Football League (NFL). He played college football for the Yale Bulldogs.

He finished 10th in the Heisman Trophy voting in 1981, receiving three first-place votes. He retired from the Dolphins after only one season in 1982. He became an orthopedic surgeon.
