= George Yarno =

American football player and coach (1957–2016)

No. 68, 66, 69
- Position: Guard

Personal information
- Born: August 12, 1957; Spokane, Washington, U.S.
- Died: August 8, 2016 (aged 58); Spokane, Washington, U.S.
- Listed height: 6 ft 2 in (1.88 m)
- Listed weight: 260 lb (118 kg)

Career information
- High school: Spokane Ferris (WA); East Anchorage (AK)
- College: Washington State
- NFL draft: 1979: undrafted

Career history

Playing
- Tampa Bay Buccaneers (1979–1983); Denver Gold (1984-1985); Tampa Bay Buccaneers (1985–1987); Atlanta Falcons (1988); Houston Oilers (1989); Green Bay Packers (1990)*
- * Offseason or practice squad member only

Coaching
- Washington State (1991–1994) Offensive line coach; Idaho (1995–1997) Offensive coordinator & offensive line coach; Houston (1998–1999) Assistant head coach & offensive line coach; Arizona State (2000) Offensive line coach; LSU (2001–2002) Offensive line coach; Washington State (2003–2007) Offensive line coach; Tampa Bay Buccaneers (2008) Assistant offensive line coach; Detroit Lions (2009–2012) Offensive line coach; Jacksonville Jaguars (2013–2014) Offensive line coach

Awards and highlights
- First-team All-Pac-8 (1977); Second-team All-Pac-10 (1978)

Career NFL statistics
- Games played: 136
- Games started: 73
- Fumble recoveries: 1
- Stats at Pro Football Reference

George Anthony Yarno (August 12, 1957 – August 8, 2016) was an American professional football player who was a guard for 10 seasons in the National Football League (NFL) with the Tampa Bay Buccaneers, Atlanta Falcons, and Houston Oilers. He also played two seasons with the Denver Gold of the United States Football League (USFL).

Yarno worked as an offensive line coach for a number of collegiate and professional teams. After his release from the Detroit Lions following the 2012 season, Yarno accepted the offensive line coach job with the Jacksonville Jaguars in 2013.

== Early life ==
Born and raised in Spokane, Washington, Yarno was one of six children; his mother Wanda died in 1962 when he was just five. His older brother John (b. 1954) was an All-American center at Idaho, and later a five-year starter in the NFL for the Seattle Seahawks.

George attended Gonzaga Preparatory School as a freshman, then spent two years in Alaska with his father and went to East Anchorage High School. He returned to Spokane and attended Ferris for his senior year, graduated in 1975, then played four years at Washington State University in Pullman under four head coaches (Jim Sweeney, Jackie Sherrill, Warren Powers, and Jim Walden), as a nose tackle and defensive tackle. He matched up often with his brother John in the Battle of the Palouse in 1975 and 1976, both games handily won by WSU at Martin Stadium.

== Professional playing career ==
Unselected in the 1979 NFL draft, Yarno was signed by the Tampa Bay Buccaneers as a rookie free agent in 1979 and made the team on the other side of the ball, as a reserve offensive lineman. He was a starting offensive lineman a majority of his career, including starts at tackle, guard, and center.

=== Scoring ===
Despite being an offensive lineman, Yarno scored one point in his NFL career, an extra point in the closing moments of the 1983 season at Detroit on December 18, indoors at the Pontiac Silverdome. As the team's emergency kicker, the straight-on left-footed Yarno entered the game with 77 seconds to play and down by four points. Head coach John McKay had removed the newly signed placekicker, barefooted Dave Warnke, after two consecutive poor kicks: a failed extra point late in the first half and an unattractive low spinning field goal attempt in the third quarter from 29 yards, when the score was tied at 13. Following Yarno's successful conversion, heartily celebrated by his fellow linemen, division champion Detroit recovered the subsequent onside kick and ran out the clock to win the game by three points, 23–20, and hapless Tampa Bay finished the year at 2–14.

== Coaching career ==
=== College assistant ===
Following his career as a player, Yarno entered the coaching ranks as a collegiate assistant at Washington State University; he coached the offensive line for four seasons under head coach Mike Price, from 1991 to 1994. He moved eight miles (13 km) east to the University of Idaho in 1995 as offensive coordinator and line coach under first-year head coach Chris Tormey. After three seasons in Moscow, Yarno left for the University of Houston in 1998 to become the assistant head coach (and offensive line coach) under head coach Kim Helton. In 2000, he was the offensive line coach for Arizona State University for a season, Bruce Snyder's last as head coach, then spent two seasons at LSU under head coach Nick Saban, again as offensive line coach. He returned to Washington State in 2003 to coach the offensive line under first-year head coach Bill Doba; following Doba's dismissal after the 2007 season, Yarno became a coach at the professional level.

=== NFL assistant ===
Yarno became an NFL assistant coach in 2008 as the assistant offensive line coach with Tampa Bay, his first professional team as a player. After a season in Tampa, Yarno joined the coaching staff of the Detroit Lions in 2009 as offensive line coach. He was recommended by offensive coordinator Scott Linehan, a former Idaho quarterback, whom Yarno had been recommended to by Nick Saban. Following a disappointing 4-12 season from the Detroit Lions after making the playoffs the year prior, Yarno was released as an assistant coach after the 2012 season. He was named the Jaguars offensive line coach on January 24, 2013. On January 20, 2015, the Jacksonville Jaguars hired former Buffalo Bills head coach Doug Marrone replacing Yarno as offensive line coach. Marrone's hiring means offensive line coach George Yarno will not return to the Jaguars in 2015, according to a team spokesman. The Jaguars announced on May 29, 2015, that Yarno had been diagnosed with cancer (stomach) and was receiving treatment. He remained under contract. Yarno died in Spokane at age 58 on August 8, 2016.
