= Frank Garcia (punter) =

American football player (born 1957)

No. 5, 6
- Position: Punter

Personal information
- Born: June 5, 1957 (age 69); Tucson, Arizona, U.S.
- Listed height: 6 ft 0 in (1.83 m)
- Listed weight: 205 lb (93 kg)

Career information
- High school: Salpointe Catholic (Tucson)
- College: Arizona; Arizona State; UNLV
- NFL draft: 1979: undrafted

Career history
- Atlanta Falcons (1979)*; San Diego Chargers (1980)*; Green Bay Packers (1981)*; Seattle Seahawks (1981); Chicago Blitz (1983); Tampa Bay Buccaneers (1983–1987)
- * Offseason or practice squad member only

Awards and highlights
- All-Pro (1983)

Career NFL statistics
- Punts: 381
- Punt yards: 15,662
- Longest punt: 64
- Stats at Pro Football Reference

Frank Benitez Garcia (born June 5, 1957) is an American former professional football player who was a punter in the National Football League (NFL). He played college football for the Arizona Wildcats, Arizona State Sun Devils and UNLV Rebels. He was signed by the Seattle Seahawks as an undrafted free agent in 1981.

Garcia also played for the Tampa Bay Buccaneers.

== NFL career statistics ==
Legend
| | Led the league |
| **Bold** | Career high |

| Year | Team | Punting | | | | | | | | | |
| Year | Team | GP | Punts | Yds | Net Yds | Lng | Avg | Net Avg | Blk | Ins20 | TB |
|---|---|---|---|---|---|---|---|---|---|---|---|
| 1981 | SEA | 1 | 2 | 74 | 74 | 41 | 37.0 | **37.0** | 0 | 0 | 0 |
| 1983 | TAM | **16** | **95** | **4,008** | **3,165** | **64** | **42.2** | 33.0 | 1 | 16 | **12** |
| 1984 | TAM | **16** | 68 | 2,849 | 2,359 | 60 | 41.9 | 34.7 | 0 | 12 | 9 |
| 1985 | TAM | **16** | 77 | 3,233 | 2,574 | 61 | 42.0 | 32.6 | **2** | 12 | 7 |
| 1986 | TAM | **16** | 77 | 3,089 | 2,519 | 60 | 40.1 | 32.7 | 0 | **19** | 8 |
| 1987 | TAM | 12 | 62 | 2,409 | 1,756 | 58 | 38.9 | 28.3 | 0 | 12 | 5 |
| Career | | 77 | 381 | 15,662 | 12,447 | 64 | 41.1 | 32.4 | 3 | 71 | 41 |
