= 1980 All-East football team =

American football players chosen by the Associated Press as best players

The 1980 All-East football team consists of American football players chosen by the Associated Press as the best players at each position among the Eastern colleges and universities during the 1980 NCAA Division I-A football season.

== Offense ==
=== Quarterback ===
- Oliver Luck, West Virginia (AP-1)
- Ed McMichael, Rutgers (AP-2)

=== Running backs ===
- Rich Diana, Yale (AP-1)
- Randy McMillan, Pitt (AP-1)
- Eddie Meyers, Navy (AP-2)
- Curt Warner, Penn State (AP-2)

=== Tight end ===
- Benjie Pryor, Pitt (AP-1)
- Curt Gainer, Navy (AP-2)

=== Wide receivers ===
- Mike Fahnestock, Army (AP-1)
- Tim Odell, Rutgers (AP-1)
- Cris Crissy, Princeton (AP-2)
- Dave Shula, Dartmouth (AP-2)

=== Tackles ===
- Bill Dugan, Penn State (AP-1)
- Mark May, Pitt (AP-1)
- Kevin Kurdyla, Rutgers (AP-2)
- Bob Regan, Yale (AP-2)

=== Guards ===
- Sean Farrell, Penn State (AP-1)
- Frank McCallister, Navy (AP-1)
- Emil Boures, Pitt (AP-2)
- Mark Chiungos, Holy Cross (AP-2)

=== Center ===
- Tony Bubniak, Colgate (AP-1)
- Russ Grimm, Pitt (AP-2)

== Defense ==
=== Ends ===
- Hugh Green, Pitt (AP-1)
- Rickey Jackson, Pitt (AP-1)
- Gene Gladys, Penn State (AP-2)
- Fred Leone, Yale (AP-2)

=== Tackles ===
- Howie Long, Villanova (AP-1)
- Bill Neill, Pitt (AP-1)
- Colin McCarty, Temple (AP-2)
- Greg Meisner, Pitt (AP-2)

=== Middle guard ===
- Jerry Boyarsky, Pitt (AP-1)
- Kevin Czinger, Yale (AP-2)

=== Linebackers ===
- Jim Collins, Syracuse (AP-1)
- Mike Kronzer, Navy (AP-1)
- Darryl Talley, West Virginia (AP-1)
- Jim Budness, Boston College (AP-2)
- Steve Conjar, Temple (AP-2)
- Ed Pryts, Penn State (AP-2)

=== Defensive backs ===
- Pete Harris, Penn State (AP-1)
- Mike Mayock, Boston College (AP-1)
- Ken Smith, Rutgers (AP-1)
- Deron Cherry, Rutgers (AP-2)
- David Martin, Villanova (AP-2)
- Lynn Thomas, Pitt (AP-2)

== Key ==
- AP = Associated Press

== See also ==
- 1980 College Football All-America Team
