= Musa Abdul-Aleem =

American basketball player

Personal information
- Born: May 2, 1988 (age 38) Atlanta, Georgia
- Listed height: 6 ft 5 in (1.96 m)
- Listed weight: 220 lb (100 kg)

Career information
- High school: C. Leon King (Tampa, Florida)
- College: Georgia Perimeter (2010–2011); South Florida (2012–2014); Troy (2014–2015)
- NBA draft: 2015: undrafted
- Playing career: 2015–2023
- Position: Shooting guard / small forward

Career history
- 2015–2016: Trotamundos
- 2016: Kymis
- 2016–2017: Club Trouville
- 2017–2018: Universidad de Concepción
- 2018: Al-Fateh
- 2018: Ostioneros de Guaymas
- 2018: AS Salé
- 2022: Broncos de Caracas
- 2023: Brillantes del Zulia

Career highlights
- GCAA Freshman of the Year (2011); First-team All-GCAA (2011); Latinbasket.com All-Chilean Liga Nacional Honorable Mention (2018); Asia-Basket.com All-Saudi Arabian SBL Second Team (2018); Asia-Basket.com Saudi Arabian SBL All-Imports Team (2018); Afrobasket.com All-Libyan League Finals MVP (2021); Afrobasket.com All-Libyan League Second Team (2021); Afrobasket.com Libyan League All-Imports Team (2021)

Musa Abdul-Aleem (born May 2, 1988) is an American basketball player who played for AS Salé of the Nationale 1. After two years at Georgia Perimeter College, two years at South Florida and one year at Troy, Abdul-Aleem entered the 2015 NBA draft but was not selected in the draft's two rounds.

== High school career ==
Abdul-Aleem played high school basketball at C. Leon King High School, in Tampa, Florida.

== College career ==
=== Georgia Perimeter College (2010-2012) ===
Abdul-Aleem played college basketball at Georgia Perimeter College from 2010 to 2012. He was Freshman Player of the Year in the Georgia Collegiate Athletic Association as well as first team all-region and a member of the all-tournament team. He led the 2011 team in scoring with a 14.7 average.

=== University of South Florida (2012-2014) ===
Abdul-Aleem attended University of South Florida from 2012-2014. During the 2012-2013 season, he missed 22 games throughout the year due to various injuries. He played his first game against Oklahoma State University after missing the first seven games due to a foot injury.

During the 2013-2014 season, he missed 14 games throughout the year due to injuries and other reasons. He averaged 4.1 points and 1.5 rebounds. He graduated in December with a degree in Leadership Studies and had one season of eligibility remaining.

=== Troy University (2014-2015) ===
For his final year of eligibility, Abdul-Aleem attended Troy University where he played in 28 games and averaged 16 points, 4.8 rebounds

== Professional career ==
Abdul-Aleem's professional career started in the 2015–16 season with Trotamundos de Carabobo of the Venezuela's Liga Profesional de Baloncesto. He appeared in 19 games for Trotamundos, averaging 14.8 points, 3.9 rebounds and 1.3 assists per game.

On July 14, 2016, Abdul-Aleem signed with the newly promoted to the Greek Basket League club Kymis. However, he left the team after appearing in two games. On December 21, 2016, Abdul-Aleem joined Club Trouville of the Uruguayan Basketball League.

On September 17, 2018, he joined AS Salé of the Moroccan Nationale 1.

On March 4, 2023, he joined Brillantes de Zulia in the Superliga Profesional de Baloncesto.

== Personal life ==
He is the son of Rashad Abdul-Aleem and has three brothers: Zayd, Anwar and Muhammad. He also has two sisters: Aligyah and Jumu'ah.
