= George Peoples =

American football player (1960-–2003)

No. 22, 35, 38
- Position: Fullback

Personal information
- Born: August 25, 1960; Tampa, Florida, U.S.
- Died: November 22, 2003 (aged 43); Tampa, Florida, U.S.
- Listed height: 6 ft 0 in (1.83 m)
- Listed weight: 214 lb (97 kg)

Career information
- High school: C. Leon King (Tampa)
- College: Auburn
- NFL draft: 1982: 8th round, 216th overall pick

Career history
- Dallas Cowboys (1982); New England Patriots (1983); Tampa Bay Buccaneers (1984–1985)

Career NFL statistics
- Games played: 32
- Rushing attempts: 8
- Rushing yards: 24
- Stats at Pro Football Reference

George Evans Peoples (August 25, 1960 – November 22, 2003) was an American professional football player who was a running back in the National Football League (NFL) for the Dallas Cowboys (1982), New England Patriots (1983), Tampa Bay Buccaneers (1984–1985). He played college football for Auburn Tigers.

== Early life ==
Peoples attended C. Leon King High School, where he was an All-American running back. He accepted a football scholarship from Auburn University.

He became a starter as a junior when he replaced the graduated Joe Cribbs. He registered 443 rushing yards (second on the team) on 96 carries (5.6 average) and was mainly used as a blocking fullback.

In his final year, the team implemented a wishbone offense under new head coach Pat Dye. He displayed his great blocking ability, while rushing for 442 yards, including a 63-yard rushing touchdown against the University of Alabama. At the end of the season, he received the team's offensive player of the year award.

He finished his college career with 1,085 rushing yards (239 carries) and 3 touchdowns. He also lettered in track and field.

== Professional career ==
=== Dallas Cowboys ===
Peoples was selected by the Dallas Cowboys in the eighth round (216th overall) of the 1982 NFL draft. He had a great pre-season, that included a 79-yard reception for a touchdown from quarterback Gary Hogeboom against the New England Patriots. As a rookie, he played mainly on special teams in 8 games during the strike-shortened season. He was waived on August 27, 1983.

=== New England Patriots ===
On August 30, 1983, he was claimed off waivers by the New England Patriots to replace an injured Larry Cowan and went on to record 9 special teams tackles. He was released on August 27, 1984.

=== Tampa Bay Buccaneers ===
The Tampa Bay Buccaneers signed him as a free agent on November 6, 1984, to provide depth in the backfield. He was cut on September 2, 1985, only to be brought back on December 13. He wasn't re-signed at the end of the year.

== Personal life ==
On November 23, 2003, he was found dead in a motel room in Tampa Bay, Florida.
