= Ed Judie =

American football player (born 1959)

No. 50, 51, 91
- Position: Linebacker

Personal information
- Born: July 6, 1959 (age 67); Tyler, Texas, U.S.
- Listed height: 6 ft 2 in (1.88 m)
- Listed weight: 231 lb (105 kg)

Career information
- High school: Tempe (AZ)
- College: Northern Arizona
- NFL draft: 1981: undrafted

Career history
- San Francisco 49ers (1981–1983); Tampa Bay Buccaneers (1983); Miami Dolphins (1984)

Awards and highlights
- Super Bowl champion (XVI)
- Stats at Pro Football Reference

Edward Charles Judie (born July 6, 1959) is an American former professional football player who was a linebacker in the National Football League (NFL). He played college football for the Northern Arizona Lumberjacks (1977–1980). He played in the NFL for the San Francisco 49ers (1982–1983), the Tampa Bay Buccaneers (1983), and Miami Dolphins (1984). He appeared in 24 NFL games, eight of them as a starter.

== Early life ==
Judie was born in 1959 in Tyler, Texas. He was born five weeks premature and spent his early weeks in an incubator. He attended Tempe High School in Tempe, Arizona. During his junior year in high school, a blood vessel in his head ruptured; doctors opined he would not survive, but he walked out of the hospital five days later.

Judie played college football for the Northern Arizona Lumberjacks from 1977 to 1980. He switched to outside linebacker in 1978. He had 83 tackles, including 17 quarterback sacks, in 1977 playing at defensive end. Judie survived a second ruptured blood vessel in his head in the spring of 1981 while working out in the weight room.

== Professional football ==
He signed with the San Francisco 49ers in 1981 but spent the year on injured reserve. During the 1982 and 1983 seasons, he appeared in 11 games, three as a starter.

He was acquired by the Tampa Bay Buccaneers during the 1983 season. He appeared in 11 games for Tampa Bay, 11 of them as a starter.

In 1984, he signed with the Miami Dolphins late in the season. He appeared in two games for the Dolphins.
