= Jeff Komlo =

American football player (1956–2009)

No. 19, 7
- Position: Quarterback

Personal information
- Born: July 30, 1956; Cheverly, Maryland, U.S.
- Died: March 14, 2009 (aged 52); Athens, Greece
- Listed height: 6 ft 2 in (1.88 m)
- Listed weight: 200 lb (91 kg)

Career information
- High school: DeMatha Catholic (Hyattsville, Maryland)
- College: Delaware
- NFL draft: 1979: 9th round, 231st overall pick

Career history
- Detroit Lions (1979–1981); Atlanta Falcons (1982); Tampa Bay Buccaneers (1983)

Career NFL statistics
- Passing attempts: 437
- Passing completions: 218
- Completion percentage: 49.9%
- TD–INT: 12–28
- Passing yards: 2,603
- Passer rating: 50.9
- Stats at Pro Football Reference

William Jeffrey Komlo (July 30, 1956 – March 14, 2009) was an American professional football player who was a quarterback for the Detroit Lions, Atlanta Falcons and Tampa Bay Buccaneers of the National Football League (NFL). He played college football for the Delaware Fightin' Blue Hens.

== Early life ==
Komlo was born in Cheverly, Maryland. Coming out of DeMatha High School in Hyattsville, Maryland, he was not heavily recruited. He had been a star for the football and baseball teams, where he played shortstop and served as the team's clean up hitter.

He aspired to be like his father William, who played college football for the Maryland Terrapins in the 1950s.

== College career ==
Komlo first attended Fork Hill Military Academy to sharpen his skills, and then transferred to Delaware, where Komlo was told by head coach Tubby Raymond he could try and make the team as a walk-on, which he did. Komlo led the Blue Hens to a 10–4 record and a berth in the 1978 NCAA Division II championship game, which they lost, 10–9, to Eastern Illinois University. During his Delaware career, Komlo set eleven school records and passed for 5,256 yards.

== Professional career ==
=== Detroit Lions ===
Komlo was selected by the Detroit Lions in the ninth round (231st overall) of the 1979 NFL draft, and was expected to be club's third-string quarterback. However, after a season-ending injury to starting quarterback Gary Danielson in a pre-season contest, head coach Monte Clark tabbed Danielson's backup, veteran Joe Reed, to start the season opener in Tampa. Things promptly got worse for the Lions: not only were they thrashed, 31–16, but Reed went down with a leg injury in the fourth quarter, forcing Komlo into the game. With no better options, Detroit decided to start Komlo in the club's second game against Washington: a rare instance of such a low-drafted rookie QB being handed an NFL starting job. In his only full season as a pro signal-caller, Komlo started fourteen games and went 183-for-368 for 2,238 yards, 11 touchdowns and 23 interceptions. Favored by many to win the NFC Central, Detroit saw its 1979 season quickly turn into a disaster, as Komlo went 2–12 as a starting quarterback; his two victories (a 24–23 win over the Atlanta Falcons and a 20–0 win over the Chicago Bears) were the Lions' only wins all season, as they set a club record with 14 losses.

In 1980, Komlo threw only four passes all year, as Danielson returned; in 1981, Komlo was mainly the third-string quarterback, with Danielson being supplanted as starter by Eric Hipple. He did start two games that season, including a 27–21 loss to the Denver Broncos that marked his final appearance in a Detroit uniform.

=== Atlanta Falcons ===
In 1982, Komlo went to the Atlanta Falcons but did not se any on-field action.

=== Tampa Bay Buccaneers ===
In 1983, his final NFL season, Komlo played for the Tampa Bay Buccaneers, but threw just eight passes in two games, stuck behind Jack "The Throwin' Samoan" Thompson and ex-New York Giant Jerry Golsteyn.

== Later life and death ==
In May 2004, Komlo was involved in a domestic incident with his girlfriend, Jennifer Winters. After they got into an argument, Komlo shoved her out of the car, which, in a drunken state, he later crashed. He returned home, got his SUV, and later crashed that vehicle as well. He was later convicted in Chester County, Pennsylvania on two drunk-driving charges, but didn't show up to be sentenced, which resulted in a bench warrant for his arrest. In August 2005, Komlo was still on the run, and featured on America's Most Wanted. He was also facing charges of cocaine possession and assault, and police wanted to question him about possible arson at his homes in West Palm Beach and Chester Springs, Pennsylvania.

Fleeing the country, Komlo ended up in Greece, working for a hair implant clinic in Athens called NHI. The clinic caters mostly to Britons, who fly to the Greek capital for something called the Choi Method, which, according to the NHI website, is "a procedure far too labour-intensive to operate in the UK."

Komlo was killed in an automobile crash in southern Athens on March 14, 2009. Pennsylvania law enforcement initially questioned whether he might have faked his own death to avoid the charges. Five days later, the Acting Chief Chester County sheriff's detective, Jim Vito, stated that the authorities were satisfied that Komlo was in fact dead.
