= Phil Freeman =

American football player (born 1962)

No. 81
- Position: Wide receiver

Personal information
- Born: December 9, 1962 (age 63); St. Paul, Minnesota, U.S.
- Listed height: 5 ft 11 in (1.80 m)
- Listed weight: 185 lb (84 kg)

Career information
- College: Arizona
- NFL draft: 1985: 8th round, 204th overall pick

Career history
- Tampa Bay Buccaneers (1985–1987)

Career NFL statistics
- Receptions: 22
- Receiving yards: 370
- Touchdowns: 4
- Stats at Pro Football Reference

Phillip Emery Freeman (born December 9, 1962) is an American former professional football player who was a wide receiver for the Tampa Bay Buccaneers of the National Football League (NFL) from 1985 to 1987. During his time with the Buccaneers, Freeman kick returned for 1,667 yards, making him one of the top kick returners in Tampa Bay Buccaneers history. Freeman played college football for the Arizona Wildcats and was selected by the Buccaneers in the eighth round of the 1985 NFL draft with the 204th overall pick.
