= Audrey O'Brien Nelson =

American nurse and research scientist

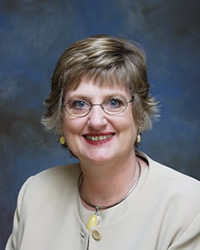
- Born: 1956 (age 69–70)
- Occupation: research scientist

Audrey O'Brien Nelson is an American registered nurse, research scientist, and professor in multiple colleges at the University of South Florida. She is the director of the VISN 8 Evidence-Based Practice Center and the Biomechanic Research Laboratory at the James A. Haley Veterans Hospital in Tampa, Florida. Nelson is also a speaker on topics related to nursing research in spinal cord injury occupational safety and patient safety.

Nelson has managed multiple studies funded from various sources, including Health Services R&D, Rehabilitation R&D, American SCI Nurses Association, Center for Nursing Research (NSRA), the Veterans Administration, and the Paralyzed Veterans of America. Products and procedures developed from her research on nursing interventions, biomechanical assessment, and equipment design in spinal cord injury patients have been applied nationwide in hospitals and nursing schools to foster nurse and patient safety. Nelson's research has played an important role in nurse safety and has been the basis of multiple nationwide nurse safety and training initiatives including the American Nurses Association "Handle with Care" campaign and the recently introduced Senate Bill, S.1788 - The Nurse and Healthcare Worker Protection Act. Nelson was a Consultant to the United Nations on Human Rights and Bioethics in the Development of Life and Health Sciences, and was selected to the OSHA National Advisory Committee on Ergonomics.

Nelson received her B.S. in nursing at University of South Florida in 1977, her M.S. in nursing at Emory University in 1980, and her Ph.D. in nursing from the University of Florida in 1990. She has joint faculty appointments at the University of South Florida in the Colleges of Engineering, Aging Studies, and Public Health, and is the associate director for Clinical Research in the College of Nursing.

In 2005, the Joint Commission, which operates accreditation programs for hospitals and other health care organizations, recognized Nelson's work in "improv[ing] the quality of care delivered to people with disabilities," and praised her for "magnif[ying] the scope of practice for patient safety and [being] a tireless advocate for those with disabilities." Tom Waters, the chief of ergonomics research at the National Institute for Occupational Safety & Health, estimated that her research has saved Americans billions of dollars in health care costs, injury expenses, and claims, as well as prevented countless injuries to nurses throughout the world.

== Post-degree honors and awards ==
- Finalist Service to America Medals, 2009
- John M. Eisenberg Award for lifetime achievement in Patient Safety, 2005
- Outstanding Contribution to SCI Nursing Award, AASCIN, 1994.
