= C. Leon King High School =

Location
- 6815 N. 56th Street; Tampa, Florida 33610; United States; 28.008521°N 82.391464°W

Information
- Type: Public high school
- Motto: Many lions, One pride
- Established: 1960; 66 years ago
- School district: Hillsborough County Public Schools
- Superintendent: Van Ayres
- School number: 2241 (for District use)
- CEEB code: 101717
- Principal: Gregory Basham
- Staff: 92.00 (FTE)
- Grades: 9–12
- Enrollment: 1,262 (2023–2024)
- Student to teacher ratio: 20.01
- Colors: Red, white, and Columbia blue
- Sports: See article
- Mascot: Lion
- Nickname: Lions (general); Lady Lions (girls sports)
- Newspaper: Scepter
- Yearbook: Clarion
- Website: www.hillsboroughschools.org/o/king

C. Leon King High School is a public high school named in Tampa, Florida.

King High School, a part of Hillsborough County Public Schools, is a traditional/hybrid magnet school. It has one of five International Baccalaureate programs in Hillsborough County, Florida. The IB program of King began in July 1994. 98% percent of IB seniors earned the IB Diploma in 2014—one of the highest rates in the United States. For the 2010–2011 school year, King High School received an A grade in education overall. As of 2017, King High has been rated a "B."

Its student population was 1,889 in 2014–15, and the attendance rate was 92% in 2005.

== History ==
Ridgewood Cemetery

The school was built on the site of Ridgewood Cemetery, a municipal cemetery for poor African-Americans established in 1942. Hillsborough County Public Schools acquired 40 acres (16 ha) of land for the school from a private company in 1959, and that company bought the site from the City of Tampa in 1957; the cemetery is in that plot and became used for agricultural classes. In 2019, officials discovered graves of 145 people.

== Academics ==
King High School hosts an International Baccalaureate (IB) Program, which began in 1994. However, that program will be phased out in favor of the King High School of Innovation, focused on cybersecurity and artificial intelligence. King High also offers Advanced Placement courses (KAPS).

== Sports ==
Fall:

- Football
- Boys Golf
- Girls Golf
- Boys Cross Country
- Girls Cross Country
- Swimming
- Volleyball

Winter:

- Boys Basketball
- Girls Basketball
- Wrestling
- Boys Soccer
- Girls Soccer

Spring:

- Baseball
- Softball
- Flag Football
- Track
- Tennis

== Notable alumni ==
- Musa Abdul-Aleem, professional basketball player
- Mike Awesome, 1984, former WWF Champion
- Addison Barger, professional baseball player
- Derek Bell, former professional baseball player
- Tim Crews, former professional baseball player
- Ty Griffin, former professional baseball player
- Eric Hayes, former NFL football player
- Pam Iorio, 1977, former mayor of Tampa
- Gary Koch, 1970, former professional golfer and ESPN sportscaster
- Jim Morrison, former professional baseball player
- Edmund Nelson, 1978, former professional football player, graduated in 1978
- Audrey O'Brien Nelson, 1973, director of VISN 8 at the James A. Haley Veterans Hospital and prominent research scientist
- Reena Ninan, 1997, television journalist
- Henry Paul, musician formerly with the Outlaws
- George Peoples, 1978, former professional football player
- Calvin Pickering, 1995, former professional baseball player
