= Steve Wilson (offensive lineman) =

American football player (born 1954)

No. 79, 50
- Positions: Center, guard

Personal information
- Born: May 19, 1954 (age 72); Fort Sill, Oklahoma, U.S.
- Listed height: 6 ft 4 in (1.93 m)
- Listed weight: 265 lb (120 kg)

Career information
- High school: Southwest (GA)
- College: Georgia
- NFL draft: 1976: 5th round, 154th overall pick

Career history
- Tampa Bay Buccaneers (1976–1985)

Career NFL statistics
- Games played: 125
- Games started: 104
- Fumble recoveries: 3
- Stats at Pro Football Reference

Steve Wilson (born May 19, 1954) is an American former professional football player who was a center for the Tampa Bay Buccaneers of the National Football League (NFL) from 1976 to 1985. He played college football for the Georgia Bulldogs and was selected in the fifth round of the 1976 NFL draft. Wilson was the last original Buccaneer to retire and the only original Buc player to be a starter in each of the first 10 seasons of the franchise. All-NFC Center following the 1979 season, he was a member of an offensive line which allowed only 12 quarterback sacks in 16 games during the 1979 season. Following the 1979 season the Buc offensive line was presented with an award in Washington D.C. as "The Best Offensive Line in the NFL." During Wilson's 10-year career, the Bucs were in the playoffs following the 1979, 1981 and 1982 seasons.

Upon Wilson's retirement following the 1985 season, long time NFL player and coach, Bill "Tiger" Johnson said, "Steve is the best pass-blocking center I have ever coached".
