= Mark Cotney =

American football player (born 1952)

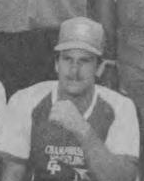
- Cotney, c. 1982

No. 33
- Position: Safety

Personal information
- Born: June 26, 1952 (age 74); Altus, Oklahoma, U.S.
- Listed height: 6 ft 0 in (1.83 m)
- Listed weight: 204 lb (93 kg)

Career information
- High school: Altus
- College: Cameron
- NFL draft: 1975: 7th round, 171st overall pick

Career history
- Houston Oilers (1975); Tampa Bay Buccaneers (1976–1984)

Career NFL statistics
- Interceptions: 17
- Fumble recoveries: 7
- Sacks: 5
- Stats at Pro Football Reference

John Mark Cotney (born June 26, 1952), is an American former professional football player who was a safety for 10 seasons with the Houston Oilers and Tampa Bay Buccaneers of the National Football League (NFL) from 1975 to 1984. He played college football for the Cameron Aggies. Selected by the Buccaneers in the 1976 NFL expansion draft, he was a member of the original winless 1976 team and the 1979 team that played in the 1979 NFC Championship game. He retired in 1986 on advice from his doctors, after suffering two cracked vertebrae in his neck while tackling Gerald Riggs in a 1985 preseason game. He continues to live in the Tampa area.
