= Hasson Arbubakrr =

American football player (born 1960)

No. 69, 60, 61
- Position: Defensive end

Personal information
- Born: December 9, 1960 (age 65); Newark, New Jersey, U.S.
- Listed height: 6 ft 5 in (1.96 m)
- Listed weight: 310 lb (141 kg)

Career information
- High school: Weequahic (Newark)
- College: Texas Tech
- NFL draft: 1983: 9th round, 238th overall pick

Career history
- Tampa Bay Buccaneers (1983); Minnesota Vikings (1984); Winnipeg Blue Bombers (1985–1987); Ottawa Rough Riders (1987–1988)

Career NFL statistics
- Sacks: 1.5
- Stats at Pro Football Reference

Hasson Arbubakrr (born December 9, 1960) is an American former professional football player who was a defensive end in the National Football League (NFL) and Canadian Football League (CFL). He was selected by the Tampa Bay Buccaneers in the ninth round of the 1983 NFL draft. He used to be known as "Tic Tic Boom" while on the Minnesota Vikings. He played a single season with the Vikings and the Tampa Bay Buccaneers (1983–1984) before playing four years in the CFL with the Winnipeg Blue Bombers (1985–1987), and the Ottawa Rough Riders.

Raised in Newark, New Jersey, Arbubakrr played his first two years of prep football at Malcolm X Shabazz High School before transferring for his final two seasons, and graduating from Weequahic High School in 1979. Arbubakrr played college football at Pasadena Community College and Texas Tech.

Arbubakrr is the father of basketball player Hassan Whiteside.
