= Lynn Thomas =

American football player (1959–2021)

No. 28, 18, 25
- Position: Defensive back

Personal information
- Born: July 9, 1959; Pascagoula, Mississippi, U.S.
- Died: April 11, 2021 (aged 61); Gulfport, Mississippi, U.S.
- Listed height: 5 ft 11 in (1.80 m)
- Listed weight: 181 lb (82 kg)

Career information
- High school: Pascagoula (Mississippi)
- College: Pittsburgh (1976–1980)
- NFL draft: 1981: 5th round, 121st overall pick

Career history
- San Francisco 49ers (1981–1982); Oakland Invaders (1984–1985)

Awards and highlights
- Super Bowl champion (XVI); Second-team All-East (1980)
- Stats at Pro Football Reference

Ronald Lynn Thomas (July 9, 1959 – April 11, 2021) was an American professional football player who was a defensive back for two seasons with the San Francisco 49ers of the National Football League (NFL). He was selected by the 49ers in the fifth round of the 1981 NFL draft after playing college football at the University of Pittsburgh. Thomas also played for the Oakland Invaders of the United States Football League (USFL). He was a member of the 49ers team that won Super Bowl XVI.

== Early life and college ==
Ronald Lynn Thomas was born on July 9, 1959, in Pascagoula, Mississippi, and attended Pascagoula High School. He was a member of the Pittsburgh Panthers football team from 1976 to 1980 and a four-year letterman from 1977 to 1980. He was named Associated Press second-team All-East in 1980.

== Professional career ==
Thomas was selected by the San Francisco 49ers in the fifth round, with the 121st overall pick, of the 1981 NFL draft. He played in 15 games for the 49ers during his rookie year in 1981. He also appeared in three playoff games that season, including Super Bowl XVI where he recovered a fumble in the 26–21 victory over the Cincinnati Bengals. He played in nine games, starting one, for the team during the 1982 season. Thomas was released on March 31, 1983.

Thomas appeared in four games for the Oakland Invaders of the United States Football League in 1984. He was also a member of the Invaders in 1985.

== Personal life ==
Thomas was the brother of fellow NFL player Norris Thomas. On April 11, 2021, Lynn died at the age of 61 in Gulfport, Mississippi.
