= Norris Thomas =

American football player (1954–2025)

- Thomas, c. 1982

No. 41
- Position: Cornerback

Personal information
- Born: May 3, 1954; Inverness, Mississippi, U.S.
- Died: March 7, 2025 (aged 70); Biloxi, Mississippi, U.S.
- Listed height: 6 ft 0 in (1.83 m)
- Listed weight: 180 lb (82 kg)

Career information
- High school: Pascagoula (Pascagoula, Mississippi)
- College: Southern Miss
- NFL draft: 1976: 9th round, 257th overall pick

Career history
- Miami Dolphins (1976–1979); Tampa Bay Buccaneers (1980–1984)

Career NFL statistics
- Interceptions: 9
- Fumble recoveries: 7
- Defensive touchdowns: 1
- Stats at Pro Football Reference

Norris Lee Thomas (May 3, 1954 – March 7, 2025) was an American professional football player who was a cornerback for nine seasons in the National Football League (NFL) for the Miami Dolphins and Tampa Bay Buccaneers. He played college football for the Southern Miss Golden Eagles. He was inducted into the Pascagoula Athletic Hall of Fame in 2016. He was the brother of fellow NFL player Lynn Thomas. He died in Biloxi, Mississippi, on March 7, 2025, at the age of 70.
