= Adger Armstrong =

American football player (born 1957)

No. 39, 46, 40
- Position: Fullback

Personal information
- Born: June 21, 1957 (age 69); Houston, Texas, U.S.
- Listed height: 6 ft 0 in (1.83 m)
- Listed weight: 213 lb (97 kg)

Career information
- High school: Cy-Fair; Jersey Village
- College: Texas A&M
- NFL draft: 1979: undrafted

Career history
- Dallas Cowboys (1979)*; Houston Oilers (1980–1982); Tampa Bay Buccaneers (1983–1985)
- * Offseason or practice squad member only

Career NFL statistics
- Rushing yards: 231
- Receiving yards: 710
- Touchdowns: 9
- Stats at Pro Football Reference

Adger Armstrong Jr. (born June 21, 1957) is an American former professional football player who was a fullback in the National Football League (NFL). He played college football for the Texas A&M Aggies. He was signed by the Dallas Cowboys as an undrafted free agent in 1979. He played for the Houston Oilers until 1982, and he played for the Tampa Bay Buccaneers from 1983 to 1985.
