= Sean Farrell (American football) =

American football player (born 1960)

No. 62, 63
- Position: Guard

Personal information
- Born: May 25, 1960 (age 66); Southampton, New York, U.S.
- Listed height: 6 ft 3 in (1.91 m)
- Listed weight: 260 lb (118 kg)

Career information
- High school: Westhampton Beach (Westhampton Beach, New York)
- College: Penn State
- NFL draft: 1982: 1st round, 17th overall pick

Career history
- Tampa Bay Buccaneers (1982–1986); New England Patriots (1987–1989); Denver Broncos (1990–1991); Seattle Seahawks (1992)

Awards and highlights
- Sporting News First-team All-NFL (1984); PFWA All-Rookie Team (1982); Unanimous All-American (1981); Second-team All-American (1980); 2× First-team All-East (1980, 1981)

Career NFL statistics
- Games Played: 123
- Games Started: 106
- Fumble recoveries: 4
- Stats at Pro Football Reference

Sean Ward Farrell (born May 25, 1960) is an American former professional football player who was a guard for the Tampa Bay Buccaneers, New England Patriots, Denver Broncos, and Seattle Seahawks of the National Football League (NFL). Farrell attended Westhampton Beach High School in Westhampton Beach, New York, where he was a football and track star. He then played college football for the Penn State Nittany Lions, earning All-American honors in 1980 and 1981.

Farrell was the first-round draft pick of Tampa Bay in the 1982 NFL draft; Buccaneers management had actually intended to select defensive end Booker Reese, and Farrell's name was turned in due to a communication error in the draft room. The team then traded the next year's first round pick in order to get Reese as well. Ironically, Farrell played at a high level for the Buccaneers, while Reese ultimately came to be considered one of the most disappointing draft picks in team history.

Tampa Bay's team performance declined during Farrell's years with the team. After his first contract expired in 1985, he signed a one-year contract for the 1986 season based on the team's assurances that things would improve, but the team had another bad year and Farrell made news by publicly telling a group of Bucs fans, "I know what I want this Christmas . . . I want to get the hell out of Tampa Bay."

New England acquired him in return for three draft picks, and he was the Patriots' starting guard for three seasons before shoulder surgery kept him on the injured reserve list for most of the 1990 season. Near the end of that season, the Patriots tried to reactivate him without using a protective designation for him; under the rules then applicable, this put him on waivers, and he was claimed by the Denver Broncos. He finished that year and played another in Denver, then one more for Seattle before concluding his NFL career.

After football, Farrell became a financial advisor with several investment companies including Merrill Lynch, and he is the chairperson of the Gay Culverhouse Player Outreach Program to assist former NFL players facing disability issues after their careers.
