= Kelly Thomas (American football) =

American football player (born 1960)

No. 70, 73
- Position: Offensive tackle

Personal information
- Born: September 9, 1960 (age 66); Lynwood, California, U.S.
- Listed height: 6 ft 6 in (1.98 m)
- Listed weight: 270 lb (122 kg)

Career information
- High school: La Mirada (La Mirada, California)
- College: USC
- NFL draft: 1983: 4th round, 99th overall pick

Career history
- Tampa Bay Buccaneers (1983–1984); Washington Redskins (1985)*; Miami Dolphins (1986)*; Los Angeles Rams (1987)
- * Offseason or practice squad member only

Career NFL statistics
- Games played: 27
- Games started: 18
- Fumble recoveries: 1
- Stats at Pro Football Reference

Kelly Thomas (born September 9, 1960) is an American former professional football player who was a tackle in the National Football League (NFL). He played college football for the USC Trojans and was selected by the Tampa Bay Buccaneers in the 4th round (99th overall) of the 1983 NFL draft. He played for the Tampa Bay Buccaneers from 1983 to 1984 and for the Los Angeles Rams in 1987.
