= Mark Witte =

American football player (born 1959)

No. 85, 81
- Position: Tight end

Personal information
- Born: December 3, 1959 (age 66); Corpus Christi, Texas, U.S.
- Listed height: 6 ft 3 in (1.91 m)
- Listed weight: 236 lb (107 kg)

Career information
- High school: San Marcos (TX)
- College: North Texas
- NFL draft: 1983: 11th round, 297th overall pick

Career history
- Tampa Bay Buccaneers (1983–1985); Detroit Lions (1987)

Career NFL statistics
- Receptions: 6
- Receiving yards: 62
- Stats at Pro Football Reference

Mark Witte (born December 3, 1959) is an American former professional football player who was a tight end in the National Football League (NFL). He played college football for the North Texas Mean Green. He was selected 297th overall in the 11th round of the 1983 NFL Draft. He played in the NFL for the Tampa Bay Buccaneers from 1983 to 1985 and for the Detroit Lions in 1987.
