= Randy Grimes =

American football player (born 1960)

No. 60
- Position: Center

Personal information
- Born: July 20, 1960 (age 66); Tyler, Texas, U.S.
- Listed height: 6 ft 4 in (1.93 m)
- Listed weight: 270 lb (122 kg)

Career information
- High school: Robert E. Lee (Tyler)
- College: Baylor
- NFL draft: 1983: 2nd round, 45th overall pick

Career history
- Tampa Bay Buccaneers (1983–1992)

Awards and highlights
- Second-team All-SWC (1982)

Career NFL statistics
- Games played: 118
- Games started: 104
- Fumble recoveries: 1
- Stats at Pro Football Reference

Randy Collins Grimes (born July 20, 1960) is an American former professional football player who was a center for the Tampa Bay Buccaneers from 1983 to 1992. He played college football for the Baylor Bears

== Playing career ==
Grimes played at Baylor University during the early 1980s and was a part of the 1980 Southwest Conference Champion Bears, which also included the likes of other NFL players Mike Singletary, Alfred Anderson, Mark Kirchner, Vic Vines, Walter Abercrombie, and Vann McElroy.

== Painkiller addiction ==
Grimes became addicted to painkillers while playing in the NFL, and was taking up to 45 pills a day. He recovered through the help of a rehabilitation facility, and currently works as a counselor at that same facility.
