= Booker Reese =

American football player (1959–2026)

No. 66
- Position: Defensive end

Personal information
- Born: September 20, 1959; Jacksonville, Florida, U.S.
- Died: March 30, 2026 (aged 66); Jacksonville, Florida, U.S.
- Listed height: 6 ft 0 in (1.83 m)
- Listed weight: 260 lb (118 kg)

Career information
- High school: Jean Ribault (Jacksonville, Florida)
- College: Bethune-Cookman
- NFL draft: 1982: 2nd round, 32nd overall pick

Career history
- Tampa Bay Buccaneers (1982–1984); Los Angeles Rams (1984–1985); Atlanta Falcons (1987)

Career NFL statistics
- Sacks: 2
- Interceptions: 2
- Stats at Pro Football Reference

Booker Reese (September 20, 1959 – March 30, 2026) was an American professional football player who was a defensive end for four seasons with the Tampa Bay Buccaneers and the Los Angeles Rams in the National Football League (NFL) from 1982 to 1985. Although not picked until the second round in the 1982 NFL draft, Reese is considered to be the biggest draft bust in Buccaneers history due to the unusual circumstances in which he was ultimately chosen.

== Biography ==
Reese played college football for the Bethune–Cookman Wildcats and was selected in the second round of the 1982 NFL draft by the Buccaneers. The Buccaneers intended to draft him in the first round, but a broken communication resulted in their mistakenly drafting Sean Farrell. Lacking a second round pick in 1982, the Buccaneers were so convinced of Reese's talent that they traded a future first round pick in the 1983 NFL draft to the Chicago Bears in order to draft Reese with the 32nd pick overall. This ill-advised transaction was consummated in spite of what was by then practically common knowledge that 1983 would be a particularly strong draft class.

Although highly talented, Reese had trouble making the mental adjustment to professional football. Frustration over his inability to excel, along with his unpreparedness for the NFL lifestyle, led to problems with alcohol and cocaine. Reese's best season in the NFL came in 1983. He played in all 16 games that season, scoring one sack and two interceptions. Reese only lasted two seasons with the Bucs before being traded to the Rams for a 12th round draft pick in 1984. He played eleven games with the Rams, who then sent him to rehab and released him. He signed with the San Francisco 49ers in 1985, but was released before the season after again failing a drug test. Ironically, the man that the Buccaneers drafted initially due to the communication error, Sean Farrell, would go on to have a productive NFL career that lasted a decade.

Reese served two two-year sentences at Okaloosa Correctional Institution for cocaine possession and parole violation: one from 2002 to 2004, and another from 2005 to 2007. Reese died on March 30, 2026 at the age of 66.
