= Danny Spradlin =

American football player (born 1959)

No. 55
- Position: Linebacker

Personal information
- Born: March 3, 1959 (age 67); Maryville, Tennessee, U.S.
- Listed height: 6 ft 1 in (1.85 m)
- Listed weight: 235 lb (107 kg)

Career information
- High school: Maryville
- College: Tennessee
- NFL draft: 1981: 5th round, 137th overall pick

Career history
- Dallas Cowboys (1981–1982); Tampa Bay Buccaneers (1983–1984); St. Louis Cardinals (1985)

Career NFL statistics
- Sacks: 1
- Fumble recoveries: 1
- Stats at Pro Football Reference

Daniel Ray Spradlin (born March 3, 1959) is an American former professional football player who was a linebacker in the National Football League (NFL) for the Dallas Cowboys, Tampa Bay Buccaneers and St. Louis Cardinals. He was selected by the Cowboys in the fifth round of the 1981 NFL draft. He played college football for the Tennessee Volunteers.

== Early life ==
Spraldin attended Maryville High School in Maryville, Tennessee. He was a three-year starter at linebacker. He received All-State, All-South and Blount County Player of the Year honors as a junior and senior.

== College career ==
Spradlin accepted a football scholarship from the University of Tennessee. As a sophomore, he earned a starting outside linebacker spot late in the season. As a junior, he finished second on the team with 102 tackles. As a senior, he led the team with 125 tackles, including a 12 tackle performance against Vanderbilt University.

== Professional career ==
=== Dallas Cowboys ===
Spradlin was selected by the Dallas Cowboys in the fifth round (137th overall) of the 1981 NFL draft. His hard hitting allowed him to make the team over fellow rookie Scott Pelluer and the team also traded Bruce Huther to make room for him on the roster. He was a backup at middle linebacker for Bob Breunig.

In 2 seasons, he played in 25 games mostly on special teams, as he struggled learning the Cowboys flex defense. In 1983, he was converted into an offensive lineman, before being traded on August 24 to the Tampa Bay Buccaneers, in exchange for a fifth round selection (#113-Steve Pelluer) in the 1984 NFL draft.

=== Tampa Bay Buccaneers ===
Spradlin was acquired for depth purposes and to play on the special teams units. In 2 seasons, he played in 31 games, starting two in 1983 because of injuries. He was released on August 26, 1985.

=== St. Louis Cardinals ===
On September 17, 1985, Spradlin was signed as a free agent by the St. Louis Cardinals. He played in seven games during the season.
