= Ken Kaplan =

American football player (born 1960)

No. 79, 71
- Position: Offensive tackle

Personal information
- Born: January 12, 1960 (age 66); Boston, Massachusetts, U.S.
- Listed height: 6 ft 4 in (1.93 m)
- Listed weight: 270 lb (122 kg)

Career information
- High school: Brockton (Brockton, Massachusetts)
- College: New Hampshire
- NFL draft: 1983: 6th round, 158th overall pick

Career history
- Tampa Bay Buccaneers (1983–1985); Green Bay Packers (1987)*; New Orleans Saints (1987)
- * Offseason or practice squad member only

Career NFL statistics
- Games played: 35
- Games started: 5
- Stats at Pro Football Reference

Kenneth Scott Kaplan (born January 12, 1960) is an American former professional football player who was a tackle in the National Football League (NFL).

He was born in Boston, Massachusetts and played college football for the New Hampshire Wildcats. Kaplan was selected in the fifth round of the 1983 NFL draft by the Tampa Bay Buccaneers. He played the 1984 and 1985 NFL seasons with the Buccaneers, and the 1987 season with the New Orleans Saints.
