= David Warnke =

American football player (born 1960)

Profile
- Position: Placekicker

Personal information
- Born: December 30, 1960 (age 65); Denver, Colorado, U.S.

Career information
- College: Augsburg

Career history
- 1983: Tampa Bay Buccaneers
- Stats at Pro Football Reference

David Warnke (born December 30, 1960) is an American former professional football player who was a placekicker for one season with the Tampa Bay Buccaneers of the National Football League (NFL).
