= 1981 Tampa Bay Buccaneers season =

NFL team season

- Owner: Hugh Culverhouse
- Head coach: John McKay
- Defensive coordinator: Tom Bass
- Home stadium: Tampa Stadium

Results
- Record: 9–7
- Division place: 1st NFC Central
- Playoffs: Lost Divisional Playoffs (at Cowboys) 0–38
- Pro Bowlers: DE Lee Roy Selmon (Co-MVP); TE Jimmie Giles
- Team MVP: QB Doug Williams

The 1981 Tampa Bay Buccaneers season was the franchise's 6th season in the National Football League the 6th playing their home games at Tampa Stadium and the 6th under head coach John McKay. The team improved on their 5–10–1 record from the 1980 season and finished 9–7.

The team was considered to be superior to the 1979 team that finished the season one game shy of the Super Bowl. With the running game and special teams ineffective, the Buccaneers depended heavily on the pass, and particularly on the big play. Jimmie Giles returned to form, establishing numerous team receiving records. Doug Williams became (with Jim Zorn) the second active quarterback to need only four seasons to reach the 10,000 career passing yards mark. The defense improved over the previous season, a change that McKay attributed to less reliance on blitzes, and a general improvement in speed due to changes in the secondary and the drafting of Hugh Green. Their defense allowed the fewest touchdowns of any NFL team, and was described by opponents as "outstanding" and "almost awesome". The team was dogged by inconsistent play throughout the season. Players and coaches believed the Buccaneers to be a playoff-worthy team, but a tendency to self-destruct kept them on the edge of the playoff race, thanks in part to a failure of any other team to take control in either the NFC Central division or the NFC wild-card chase. "We make more mistakes at crucial times than any team I've ever been associated with", said ex-Buckeyes, -Raiders, and -Dolphins safety Neal Colzie. Opposing coach Dick Vermeil said, "I'm not sure they know how good they are", after his Philadelphia Eagles team beat the Buccaneers despite having been outplayed. Nevertheless, the team developed a maturity through the season which allowed them to remain competitive instead of collapsing when behind or when being outplayed.

Late-season coaching adjustments improved the effectiveness of the offense and cut down on opposing teams' ability to control the ball against the defense. This resulted in their playing with more confidence, and less predictability. It also resulted in a three-game winning streak that put them in control of the division race. The regular season culminated in a season-finale matchup between the Buccaneers and the Detroit Lions, two 8–7 teams vying for the division lead in the Pontiac Silverdome, where the Lions had gone undefeated all season. The Buccaneers won and entered the playoffs as the number three seed in the NFC, where they lost to the Dallas Cowboys in a 38–0 rout which tied the NFL record for largest margin of victory in a playoff game.

== Offseason ==
=== NFL draft ===
1981 Tampa Bay Buccaneers Draft
Draft order		Player name	Position	College
Round	Selection	Player name	Position	College
1	7	Hugh Green	Linebacker	Pittsburgh
2	34	James Wilder Sr.	Running back	Missouri
4	89	John Holt	Defensive back	West Texas A&M
8	199	Denver Johnson	Offensive tackle	Tulsa
9	228	Mike Ford	Quarterback	SMU
10	254	Ken McCune	Defensive end	Texas
11	283	Johnny Ray Smith	Defensive back	Lamar
12	310	Brad White	Nose tackle	Tennessee

==== Draft trades ====
The Buccaneers' third-round pick was traded to the Los Angeles Rams in 1978, for guard Greg Horton. Their fifth-round pick had been traded to the Oakland Raiders in 1978 as part of the trade for quarterback Mike Rae. Their sixth-round pick was traded to the New Orleans Saints in 1979 for punter Tom Blanchard. Finally, their seventh-round pick went to Dallas as part of the previous season's trade for Dave Stalls.

==== Draft selections ====
Pittsburgh defensive end Hugh Green was a surprise selection, as the Buccaneers were considered to need help in the secondary, and were expected to pick either USC safety Ronnie Lott or UCLA safety Kenny Easley (who had already been taken by the Seattle Seahawks by the time of Tampa Bay's selection). Green's Pittsburgh team produced eight NFL starters, believed to be the most by far from any single college team. By contrast, the Georgia team that finished ahead of them in the national championship race produced only two NFL players, neither of them a starter. Personnel director Ken Herock described Green as "dominating...a heavy hitter...an impact player" and said that there was no choice but to draft him. Scouting services described him as a 220-lb linebacker with the lateral movement of a 180-lb cornerback. It was doubly surprising that, considering their fondness for ex-USC players, the Buccaneers would pass over Lott to select a player at a position at which they already were so deeply stocked with talent. However, the staff did not deliberate long before calling his name, and soon felt him worthy of Rookie of the Year honors. With no premier defensive backs available in the second round, and with running back having been identified by the coaching staff as a problem area of the team, they selected Missouri running back James Wilder Sr. Wilder's selection and subsequent training camp performance made starting fullback Johnny Davis expendable, and he was traded to San Francisco for James Owens. With their middle-round picks traded away, West Texas A&M cornerback John Holt became the Buccaneers' last selection of the first day of the draft. When McKay saw cornerbacks Holt and Johnny Ray Smith return punts, he immediately cut original Buccaneer Danny Reece, who had handled nearly every punt return in the team's first five years. Reece, who had set a league record by calling for fair catches only twice in the previous two seasons, had fallen out of favor due to several fumbles during the previous season, and never had the speed expected of a return man. Smith did make the team, but was immediately placed on injured reserve. Eighth-round pick Denver Johnson left camp unexpectedly shortly before the first preseason game, despite strong prospects of making the squad. It was later revealed that he had been accepted to law school, and chose that over a football career.

== Preseason ==
Tailback having been a problem spot the previous season, the Buccaneers attempted to accommodate Ricky Bell's desire to play in California, but were unable to work out a trade. The contract of Jerry Eckwood, who had received much criticism for fumbling at key moments the previous season, was renegotiated in accordance with his 1979 production, rather than his 1980 production. His agent's statement that "he will either play and do well, or he's not gonna be here" was interpreted to mean that Eckwood would be paid too highly to remain as a backup, but would not feel underpaid should a Bell trade place him in a starting role. The decline in Bell's performance was such that Eckwood moved ahead of him on the depth chart. The existence of the muscle disease that would soon lead to Bell's retirement and death was not yet known. Bell cited McKay's criticism as a reason for requesting a trade, but smoothed over differences in a meeting with McKay. Defensive line became an area for concern during preseason, as Reggie Lewis and two rookies walked out of camp. This was the second year in a row that the highly regarded Lewis left camp, but this time he sent word of his retirement through his agent. Extra security had to be assigned to Neal Colzie during camp, as his life was being threatened by anonymous phone calls believed to be related to the gangland-style slaying of his two stepsisters in Atlanta.

Injuries quickly became a challenge, as the team lost more players to injuries in their first preseason game than they did during the entire 22-game (preseason through playoffs) 1979 season. The secondary, particularly the safety position, was hit especially hard. Mark Cotney was lost for the season with a knee injury, Curtis Jordan suffered a broken collarbone, and Cedric Brown missed some time with a bruised shoulder. Cotney was expected to have lost his starting role to Colzie, but was valued as a backup. Jordan was lost to the team when, upon being activated from injured reserve later in the season, he was claimed off of procedural waivers by the Washington Redskins. An injury to Dave Reavis during the same game required arthroscopic surgery that left him sidelined into the regular season, and left the team with only two offensive tackles. As the team had opened training camp with a small roster, McKay had to trade draft picks to the Philadelphia Eagles and Los Angeles Rams to augment the roster with safeties Zac Henderson and Jeff Delaney, and tackle Rick Dozier. Ray Snell was also sidelined, for the second consecutive year, with severe headaches which were attributed to high blood pressure. Rick Berns, the 1979 third-round draft pick who was a capable runner but ineffective as a blocker and passer and who had never been able to recover from McKay's public criticism the previous season, was released late in camp. An unexpected shakeup of the receiving corps took place when ex-Steeler Theo Bell and ex-49er James Owens, both among the NFL's leading returners, were brought in with an eye toward improving the special teams. This resulted in the displacement of former FSU star Mike Shumann and original Buccaneer Isaac Hagins, who were promptly released with the hope that they would still have time to catch on with another team. Owens, an Olympic sprinter, came to the team in a late trade, as did Dallas Cowboys starting cornerback Aaron Mitchell, a tough tackler brought in to fill Cotney's role in run support. Adjustments were made to the team's defensive philosophy, with the secondary moving to a more aggressive style of play intended to cut down on opponents' success in the short passing game. The secondary also benefited from an improved pass rush, with Hugh Green's presence preventing blockers from concentrating their efforts on Lee Roy Selmon. James Wilder emerged as a reliable receiver, leading the team in catches during the preseason. McKay reported being happy with the team's preseason performance, saying that they were playing with the intensity and enthusiasm that had been missing the previous year.

== Regular season ==
Coach McKay said, "if we had a high bridge here, I'd jump off it", after an early loss to the Kansas City Chiefs in which the Buccaneers achieved only 12 yards rushing and the special teams "completely collapsed". He promised changes, which could mean either personnel changes or scrapping their balanced offense in favor of a passing-dominated attack. The offensive line was unable to block effectively on running plays, with both starting tackles injured. Changes came after week 3, with Garo Yepremian's release resulting in an acrimonious dispute in which Yepremian accused the Buccaneers of lacking organization, compared the move to "taking your car to get the tires changed when the transmission needs fixing", and said that "they must know what they're doing, they're in first place" (a point of ridicule, as the entire division was tied at 1–2). McKay in turn accused Yepremian of acting childishly, asking "what is he, 12 or 37?" Coaches had soured on Yepremian due to his short kickoffs and low, easily blocked field goals. Punter Tom Blanchard was placed on injured reserve with a hamstring injury the same week. The two kickers were replaced by ex-Cardinals and -Lions punter Larry Swider, and kicker Bill Capece, holder of FSU's single-season scoring record. There was a measure of irony in both signings, as Swider had at one time been on the Buccaneers' roster, but was claimed by the Lions off of procedural waivers when the Buccaneers tried to activate him as Dave Green's injury replacement during the 1979 season, while it was Yepremian's mentorship a decade earlier that had given Capece the encouragement to pursue professional football. After some undisclosed discipline problems, Dave Lewis was replaced by Andy Hawkins, who played well enough to take Lewis' spot permanently.

The coaching began to be criticized after a pair of midseason losses to the Minnesota Vikings and Denver Broncos. Denver players stated that shutting down Jimmie Giles was all it took to stop the Buccaneer offense, while the defense was still vulnerable to a short-yardage, ball-control attack. McKay felt that the team had become an "aerial circus" and that Williams' performance was being affected by trying to do too much, and so made a decision to establish a running game, taking over playcalling responsibilities on running plays. Having lost 4 of their last 5 games, there was concern that, about to face a Green Bay Packers team on a three-game win streak, the Buccaneers were about to repeat the late-season slides of the last three seasons. After breaking their two-game losing streak by routing the Packers, the Buccaneers demonstrated a newfound ability to continue to stick to and execute their game plan when playing with a deficit. Quarterbacks coach Bill Nelsen correctly predicted that the Buccaneers' performance against the Packers would cause the Vikings to underestimate the Packers, and thus lose their matchup the following week. Nelsen admonished the team not to miss a chance to take charge of the division, and they responded with an uncharacteristic rebound from a 14-point deficit against the Saints. A week-14 last-minute victory over the Atlanta Falcons, combined with upset losses by the Lions and Vikings the same day, left the Buccaneers needing to win only one of their last two games to make the playoffs. They were one of only five teams in week 15 who were capable of winning a division championship without help from another team. The season ended with a matchup against the Detroit Lions in front of a Pontiac Silverdome-record crowd of 80,444, with the Buccaneers and Lions tied for the division lead at 8–7. A season-ending New York Giants win against the Dallas Cowboys left the Giants at 9–7, guaranteeing that the winner of the Buccaneers-Lions game would win the division (the Packers were still in contention, but required an improbable set of circumstances that included a Buccaneers-Lions tie), while the loser would miss the playoffs entirely. Although the Lions outplayed the Buccaneers in most statistical categories, numerous Buccaneers stepped forward with key plays at crucial moments in the game, resulting in an upset victory. A crowd of over 8,000 gathered at team headquarters to greet them on their return from Detroit. The Buccaneers traveled to Dallas for a matchup with the Cowboys, where they suffered an embarrassing 38–0 shutout.

=== Schedule ===
Week	Date	Opponent	Result	Record	Venue	Attendance
1	September 5	**Minnesota Vikings**	**W** 21–13	1–0	Tampa Stadium	66,287
2	September 13	at Kansas City Chiefs	**L** 19–10	1–1	Arrowhead Stadium	50,555
3	September 20	at **Chicago Bears**	**L** 28–17	1–2	Soldier Field	60,130
4	September 27	St. Louis Cardinals	**W** 20–10	2–2	Tampa Stadium	65,850
5	October 4	**Detroit Lions**	**W** 28–10	3–2	Tampa Stadium	71,733
6	October 11	at **Green Bay Packers**	**W** 21–10	4–2	Lambeau Field	52,264
7	October 18	at Oakland Raiders	**L** 18–16	4–3	Oakland–Alameda County Coliseum	42,288
8	October 25	at Philadelphia Eagles	**L** 20–10	4–4	Veterans Stadium	70,174
9	November 1	**Chicago Bears**	**W** 20–10	5–4	Tampa Stadium	68,688
10	November 8	at **Minnesota Vikings**	**L** 25–10	5–5	Metropolitan Stadium	47,038
11	November 15	Denver Broncos	**L** 24–7	5–6	Tampa Stadium	64,518
12	November 22	**Green Bay Packers**	**W** 37–3	6–6	Tampa Stadium	63,251
13	November 29	at New Orleans Saints	**W** 31–14	7–6	Louisiana Superdome	62,209
14	December 6	Atlanta Falcons	**W** 24–23	8–6	Tampa Stadium	69,221
15	December 13	San Diego Chargers	**L** 24–23	8–7	Tampa Stadium	67,388
16	December 20	at **Detroit Lions**	**W** 20–17	9–7	Pontiac Silverdome	80,444
Note: Division opponents in **bold** text.

=== Game summaries ===
==== Week 1: vs Minnesota Vikings ====
	1	2	3	4	Total
Vikings	0	0	6	7	**13**
**Buccaneers**	7	0	0	14	**21**

September 5, 1981, at Tampa Stadium, Tampa, Florida

A Saturday-evening game left the Buccaneers as the first winners of the 1981 season. The Buccaneers scored on a 55-yard pass from Doug Williams to Kevin House, and a 10-yard Williams run. The Buccaneers' rushing attack struggled, although Jerry Eckwood had an apparent 39-yard touchdown run that was called back due to penalty. Williams was held to 8 completions on 22 attempts for only 108 yards, but was able to lead a 76-yard scoring drive in the fourth quarter, after the Vikings had closed to within 7–6 on a pair of Rick Danmeier field goals. The Vikings answered with a 72-yard drive of their own that ended in a 4-yard Steve Dils touchdown pass to Joe Senser. With Tampa Bay holding a 14–13 lead, Neal Colzie sealed the victory by returning his second interception of the day 82 yards for a touchdown, preventing the Vikings' potentially game-winning field goal attempt. McKay later said, "Neal pulled us out of the fire. As I was watching him run it back, I could only think how glad I was we picked him up last year". Dils passed for 361 yards on 62 attempts, still the most pass attempts against the Buccaneers in a game. The Buccaneers set several team records which still stand, including most passing attempts, completions, and first downs, and Dana Nafziger's 6 special teams tackles.

==== Week 2: at Kansas City Chiefs ====
	1	2	3	4	Total
Buccaneers	7	0	3	0	**10**
**Chiefs**	7	3	3	6	**19**

September 13, 1981, at Arrowhead Stadium, Kansas City, Missouri

A bad snap resulted in punter Tom Blanchard being tackled at the 14-yard line, setting up the Chiefs' only touchdown of the day, an 8-yard Ted McKnight run. The Buccaneers answered with a drive culminating in a 2-yard James Wilder touchdown run. The game was marked by breakdowns of the Buccaneer special teams. Blanchard kicked an 18-yard punt after bobbling the snap, and J.T. Smith was allowed to return a punt 62 yards. The defense held the Chiefs to 59 first-half yards, with the score tied 10–10 at halftime. The Kansas City offense controlled the ball for 23 of 30 minutes in the second half, sidelining a Buccaneer offense that was able to manage only 12 yards rushing. Buccaneer offensive and defensive collapses were seen to coincide with the departures of tackle Charley Hannah and defensive end Lee Roy Selmon, respectively, both with hamstring injuries. Chiefs coach Marv Levy opted for a conservative offensive strategy, twice settling for field goals when stopped on the 2-yard line. Nick Lowery's four field goals were the most by the Chiefs in a game since 1976. McKay, speaking of his team's performance, said "It will take them a long time to get the smell out of this stadium". The 2–0 start was the Chiefs' best since their Super Bowl season of 1969.

==== Week 3: at Chicago Bears ====
	1	2	3	4	Total
Buccaneers	7	0	7	3	**17**
**Bears**	0	14	7	7	**28**

September 20, 1981, at Soldier Field, Chicago

The Buccaneers took an early lead on Mike Washington's 29-yard interception return for a touchdown, after which he left the game with a pulled stomach muscle. Ricky Bell chipped a shoulder bone on his only play of the game. A Gary Fencik interception set up a Matt Suhey touchdown run that evened the score at 7–7. The Buccaneers' special teams broke down for the second week in a row. Jeff Fisher's 88-yard punt return touchdown broke the record for the longest punt return by a Tampa Bay opponent, a record that had been set by J. T. Smith just the previous week. A long Theo Bell punt return was called back for a penalty. The Buccaneers scored again on the first drive of the second half, which ended in a Kevin House touchdown reception. However, the Bears were able to dominate possession of the football for the rest of the game, with Walter Payton moving into fourth-place all-time in NFL rushing yardage. Despite a game plan that Jimmie Giles described as the best he'd seen against the Bears, the Buccaneers found themselves prone to errors at critical moments. They outperformed the Bears in most major offensive categories, compiling 450 yards of offense. Several players blamed mental errors and the lack of a killer instinct for the failure to put away what they felt to be an inferior team, while others noted that the large number of injuries left the team without enough personnel to do the things they wanted to. The game left all NFC Central teams tied at 1–2.

==== Week 4: vs St. Louis Cardinals ====
	1	2	3	4	Total
Cardinals	0	3	7	0	**10**
**Buccaneers**	6	0	0	14	**20**

September 27, 1981, at Tampa Stadium, Tampa, Florida

The Buccaneers played without linebacker Dave Lewis, who was benched for arriving late to a team meeting. New placekicker Bill Capece provided a pair of field goals, the Buccaneers' only offense through the first three-quarters. A tripping penalty on Calvin Favron erased a fourth-quarter Neil O'Donoghue field goal and forced the Cardinals to punt. The Buccaneers scored the winning points on a James Owens touchdown run on the ensuing possession, and scored again on a Jerry Eckwood run shortly thereafter. Owens appeared to have been wrapped up by Favron on the touchdown run, but was able to break free for the score on what was to date his only carry of the season. James Wilder led Buccaneer rushers with 15 carries for 76 yards, and caught 9 passes for 72 yards. Doug Williams completed 17 of 30 passes for 162 yards. Ottis Anderson led Cardinals running backs with 20 carries for 97 yards, and Jim Hart completed 11 of 18 passes for 91 yards.

==== Week 5: vs Detroit Lions ====
	1	2	3	4	Total
Lions	10	0	0	0	**10**
**Buccaneers**	0	14	0	14	**28**

October 4, 1981, at Tampa Stadium, Tampa, Florida

In front of the largest crowd to ever attend a regular-season game at Tampa Stadium, the Tampa Bay defense held Billy Sims, in only his second year the Lions' career leader in 100-yard games, to only 75 yards rushing while forcing six turnovers. Several other potential interceptions were dropped. The Buccaneers were held to only 49 yards rushing, but Doug Williams compensated by passing for four touchdowns. Williams was dazed by a blow to the head from Lions tackle Doug English, but returned to the game. The Lions' only touchdown was set up by a botched first-quarter punt attempt. Coming after an Eddie Murray field goal, it produced a 10–0 Lions lead that had the crowd cheering when an airplane carrying a "Throw McKay in the Bay" banner flew overhead shortly afterward. Williams then hit Kevin House with two touchdown passes, the second of which was controversial due to replays that showed it inconclusive whether House had both feet in bounds. It was speculated that House was given the benefit of the doubt due to pass interference not having been called on the previous play, when Jimmie Giles was tackled before Williams could even get the pass off. After the concussion, Williams returned to throw touchdown passes to James Wilder and Jim Obradovich. Gordon Jones, Ricky Bell and Lee Roy Selmon all missed the game for the Buccaneers, while Jeff Komlo replaced injured Lions quarterback Gary Danielson. It was believed to be the first Buccaneer game in which neither Selmon played.

==== Week 6: at Green Bay Packers ====
	1	2	3	4	Total
**Buccaneers**	0	7	14	0	**21**
Packers	7	0	0	3	**10**

October 11, 1981, at Lambeau Field, Green Bay, Wisconsin

Newly acquired Packers receiver John Jefferson fell on his rear end while showing off for the crowd during pregame introductions, a display that inspired the Buccaneer defense. After the Packers took an early 7–0 lead on a Gerry Ellis touchdown run, the Buccaneers scored 21 unanswered points. Doug Williams completed 15 of 23 passes for 199 yards, a career-best 65.2% completion percentage. Green Bay attempted a late rally, as George Cumby's 68-yard return of a James Wilder goal-line fumble set up a field goal to bring the score to 21–10. After the Buccaneers were forced to punt on the following possession, the Packers drove all the way to the Tampa Bay 7-yard line before Scot Brantley intercepted a Lynn Dickey pass to kill the drive. Dickey, under the pressure of a constant pass rush, was also intercepted by Hugh Green, Cecil Johnson, and Neal Colzie.

==== Week 7: at Oakland Raiders ====
	1	2	3	4	Total
Buccaneers	0	0	7	9	**16**
**Raiders**	12	3	0	3	**18**

October 18, 1981, at Oakland–Alameda County Coliseum, Oakland, California

The Raiders entered the game having set a postwar NFL record of three consecutive games without scoring. Breakdowns on Tampa Bay special teams helped the Raiders to take a 15–0 halftime lead, and eventually to win the game. The Buccaneers could not manage even a first down on offense until Doug Williams' 77-yard touchdown pass to Kevin House in the third quarter. They took the lead on a Jimmie Giles touchdown reception and a Bill Capece field goal. After the Raiders answered with a Chris Bahr field goal, Tampa Bay drove to the Raider 14-yard line, where Ted Hendricks deflected Capece's potentially game-winning last-minute field goal attempt. The loss dropped the Buccaneers out of their first-place tie with the Minnesota Vikings in the NFC Central.

==== Week 8: at Philadelphia Eagles ====
	1	2	3	4	Total
Buccaneers	7	0	0	3	**10**
**Eagles**	0	7	0	13	**20**

October 25, 1981, at Veterans Stadium, Philadelphia

The Buccaneers had trouble keeping their footing on a rain-soaked Philadelphia field. Bill Capece missed three field goals, while Neal Colzie's slip while covering Charlie Smith set up a Tony Franklin field goal. Wilbert Montgomery suffered a pinched nerve in the first half that was expected to keep him sidelined for a month, but he instead returned in the second half to gain 119 yards on 22 carries. The Buccaneers failed to capitalize on a questionable Philadelphia play-call in the fourth quarter, when the Eagles elected to run on fourth-and-one, despite holding a 13–10 lead. Norris Thomas recovered Booker Russell's fumble on the ensuing play, and if not for Ron Jaworski's tackle, would have run for a touchdown. Doug Williams' interception two plays later ended any hopes of a comeback. The Eagles finished the game with an NFL-best 7–1 record.

==== Week 9: vs Chicago Bears ====
	1	2	3	4	Total
Bears	3	0	0	7	**10**
**Buccaneers**	0	10	7	3	**20**

November 1, 1981, at Tampa Stadium, Tampa, Florida

The Buccaneers drew inspiration from pregame comments in which Gary Fencik and other Bears players said that the Buccaneers lacked patience and could only win by the big play. The Buccaneers responded by winning on big plays, touchdown passes of 81 yards to Jimmie Giles and 51 yards to Kevin House. Giles scored his touchdown by outrunning safety Doug Plank, the player who had notoriously speared him during a meeting the previous year. It was the longest pass play in Buccaneers history, and is still the longest reception by a Buccaneers tight end. The Buccaneers also scored on two Bill Capece field goals, although he missed two others from short range. A third-quarter interception by Hugh Green was considered to be the key play of the game. Walter Payton became only the fourth running back in the history of the NFL to gain 9,000 career rushing yards, the only bright spot for the Bears in a loss that left them with the second-worst record in the NFL. A Minnesota Vikings loss left the Buccaneers tied with the Vikings for first place in the NFC Central. McKay mocked Fencik's comments during his postgame press conference, in which he pointed out the "patience" with which various players performed, claimed to have gotten Patience on waivers from Green Bay, and said that "they've got enough problems with their team without coaching our team".

==== Week 10: at Minnesota Vikings ====
	1	2	3	4	Total
Buccaneers	0	0	3	7	**10**
**Vikings**	3	13	7	2	**25**

November 8, 1981, at Metropolitan Stadium, Bloomington, Minnesota

John McKay said, "that might be the poorest game we've ever played", after the Buccaneers were able to control the ball for only 19½ of the game's 60 minutes. A 95-yard second-quarter drive gave the Vikings a 13–0 lead and used up 9:04 worth of clock time, while keeping the ball away from the Buccaneer offense and forcing them to stand on the sideline in the freezing wind. The Vikings rushed for 205 yards, led by Ted Brown's career-high 129 yards on 31 carries.

==== Week 11: vs Denver Broncos ====
	1	2	3	4	Total
**Broncos**	7	0	7	10	**24**
Buccaneers	0	0	7	0	**7**

November 15, 1981, at Tampa Stadium, Tampa, Florida

The Buccaneers' only score came on Cedric Brown's 80-yard return of a Steve DeBerg interception, which tied the score at 7–7 in the third quarter. Denver responded with an 80-yard drive, assisted by Norris Thomas' two personal fouls against Rick Upchurch. The Broncos then went on to score on their next two possessions. DeBerg played in relief of Craig Morton, who left the game with a sprained shoulder in the second quarter. The Broncos were able to efficiently control the ball through short-yardage gains. Their quarterbacks were a combined 20 of 29 for 143 yards passing, while their backs ran 41 times for 153 yards. Jimmie Giles passed Morris Owens to become the leading receiver in Buccaneer history, while the ground game was held under 50 yards for the fourth time in the season. Despite their 5–6 record, the Buccaneers held the tiebreaker advantage over the other six teams tied with them for the final wild-card playoff slot.

==== Week 12: vs Green Bay Packers ====
	1	2	3	4	Total
Packers	0	0	0	3	**3**
**Buccaneers**	3	24	0	10	**37**

November 22, 1981, at Tampa Stadium, Tampa, Florida

Needing a win to maintain their playoff hopes, the Buccaneers broke a two-game losing streak while setting several team records, including most points scored and largest margin of victory. The Packers appeared to be driving for a touchdown after Tampa Bay took an early 3–0 lead, but an injury to quarterback David Whitehurst forced the Packers to replace him with the inexperienced Rich Campbell. Shortly thereafter, Cedric Brown caught the first of Campbell's four interceptions while scoring a touchdown on an interception return for the second week in a row. The special teams performed well, with John Holt returning a punt 56 yards and Bill Capece kicking three field goals, including a Buccaneer-record 51-yarder. For the first time ever, Tampa Bay went the entire game without having to punt. Despite a league-worst rushing average, the Buccaneers ran for 212 yards, led by James Owens with 112. Owens' 35-yard touchdown run was the longest Buccaneer touchdown run in Tampa Stadium. The win was attributed to several changes in coaching approach. As the offensive line was performing poorly due to injuries that kept them from maintaining a consistent lineup, McKay simplified the offense by calling the same plays repeatedly. McKay also allowed the team to practice without pads during the week, while instituting defensive changes designed to cut down on opponents' ability to control the ball through consistent short-yardage gains. He also took more of a hands-on approach to game day, giving a pep talk to the team prior to the game, and taking over the calling of the running plays. Defensive end Bill Kollar suffered a cartilage tear that required season-ending knee surgery, although the possibility remained that he could be back for the playoffs.

==== Week 13: at New Orleans Saints ====
	1	2	3	4	Total
**Buccaneers**	0	10	7	14	**31**
Saints	7	7	0	0	**14**

November 29, 1981, at the Louisiana Superdome, New Orleans

The Saints took an early 14–0 lead on a 6-yard pass from Archie Manning to tight end Larry Hardy and an 8-yard George Rogers run. A 51-yard Bill Capece field goal put the Buccaneers on the scoreboard. With a 14–3 lead late in the second quarter, Manning saw Hardy beat Mike Washington on a passing play, but Hardy ran an unexpected route, and Washington intercepted the pass. Doug Williams then hit Kevin House with a touchdown pass. A timeout controversy gave the Saints the ball with three seconds left in the first half. Neal Colzie, blinded from an earlier scratch to his eye, missed the coverage on Jeff Groth, who caught Manning's last-second pass that would have gone for a touchdown if not for Norris Thomas' tackle on the 4-yard line. The Saints would not have a scoring opportunity for the rest of the game. Williams led the Buccaneers 75 yards to take the lead on the opening drive of the second half. Andy Hawkins prevented a first down on a fourth-quarter fake punt, setting up a 51-yard drive that left the score at 24–14. A later 96-yard fourth-quarter drive was the Buccaneers' longest to date. The win put the Buccaneers into a three-way tie for first place in the NFC Central division.

==== Week 14: vs Atlanta Falcons ====
	1	2	3	4	Total
Falcons	3	6	7	7	**23**
**Buccaneers**	7	7	3	7	**24**

December 6, 1981, at Tampa Stadium, Tampa, Florida

The Buccaneers met the Atlanta Falcons as both teams remained in playoff contention with 7–6 records. Inspired by news of losses by both of their chief rivals in the division race, the Buccaneers took a 14–3 lead on a 1-yard Jerry Eckwood touchdown and a 38-yard Jimmie Giles reception. The Falcons took a 16–14 lead early in the second half, a half in which the lead alternated several times. Doug Williams completed 19 of 29 passes for 336 yards and two touchdowns. One of these, a 71-yarder on which he caught Kevin House in single coverage against rookie cornerback Bobby Butler, gave the Buccaneers a 24–23 lead and put Williams past the 10,000-yard career passing mark. Scott Hutchinson preserved the win by deflecting a Mick Luckhurst field goal attempt in the final seconds.

==== Week 15: vs San Diego Chargers ====
	1	2	3	4	Total
**Chargers**	7	7	0	10	**24**
Buccaneers	7	0	3	13	**23**

December 13, 1981, at Tampa Stadium, Tampa, Florida

Dan Fouts had to pass even more than usual, with running back Chuck Muncie, the league's leading scorer, forced out of the game after only three carries. Fouts completed 33 of 49 passes for 351 yards and a touchdown against the Buccaneers' league-leading secondary. His only touchdown was a 27-yarder to Eric Sievers, the longest touchdown pass against the Buccaneers all season. He was intercepted twice. The Chargers also scored on runs of 8-yards by John Cappelletti and 1-yard by James Brooks, while the Buccaneers scored on a 58-yard reception by Theo Bell and a Bill Capece field goal. Brooks' touchdown was set up by a James Owens fumble, the Buccaneers' first fumble on a running play all season. With the Buccaneers down 21–10 in the fourth quarter, James Wilder scored on runs of 8 and 23 yards in the span of 27 seconds. Dave Lewis forced a Cappelletti fumble that gave the Buccaneers an opportunity to score again, but a hit by Glen Edwards caused Jimmie Giles to lose control of a reception, resulting in a Woody Lowe interception that led to Rolf Benirschke's game-winning field goal. Edwards also intercepted a last-minute pass by Doug Williams. Capece was criticized harshly when, despite having earlier kicked a 49-yard field goal, he missed an extra point attempt that provided the margin of victory for the Chargers. Williams completed 22 of 35 passes for 321 yards, raising his season completion percentage above 50% for the first time in his career. Fouts' touchdown gave him a league-leading total of 32 on the season. The Chargers had been facing elimination from the playoff race with a loss, but instead found themselves with the opportunity to win the AFC West. Their win also denied the New York Jets a playoff spot.

==== Week 16: at Detroit Lions ====
	1	2	3	4	Total
**Buccaneers**	3	7	0	10	**20**
Lions	0	7	3	7	**17**

December 20, 1981, at the Pontiac Silverdome, Pontiac, Michigan

The Buccaneers won the NFC Central division by defeating the Detroit Lions at their home stadium, where the Lions had only lost two games in the two previous seasons. Doug Williams compared calling plays against the crowd noise to trying to shout above an airplane. Tampa Bay took the lead on the longest passing play in their history, an 84-yard second-quarter pass from Williams to Kevin House. After the Lions tied the score at 10, the Buccaneers retook the lead on a Bill Capece field goal 12 seconds into the fourth quarter. Dave Logan scored the winning points 70 seconds later on a fumble-return touchdown following Lee Roy Selmon's sack of Lions quarterback Eric Hipple. The Lions closed to 20–17 on an 8-yard pass from Hipple to Leonard Thompson, but the Buccaneers were able to run out the clock when Theo Bell recovered the ensuing onside kick. Two key special teams tackles prevented touchdowns by Lions return man Robbie Martin; on the second of these, he suffered a cartilage tear that left him unable to finish the game. Cedric Brown recorded two interceptions, the first of which ended a long Lions drive that threatened to give them a 14–3-second-quarter lead. The second, caught in the end zone, prevented a potential Lions touchdown. The two interceptions left Brown with a team-record nine for the season.

=== Standings ===
NFC Central
	W	L	T	PCT	DIV	CONF	PF	PA	STK
^{(3)} Tampa Bay Buccaneers	9	7	0	.563	6–2	9–3	315	268	W1
Detroit Lions	8	8	0	.500	4–4	6–6	397	322	L1
Green Bay Packers	8	8	0	.500	4–4	7–7	324	361	L1
Minnesota Vikings	7	9	0	.438	4–4	6–6	325	369	L5
Chicago Bears	6	10	0	.375	2–6	2–10	253	324	W3

== Postseason ==
=== Schedule ===
Round	Date	Opponent	Result	Record	Venue	Attendance
Divisional	January 2	at Dallas Cowboys	L 0–38	0–1	Texas Stadium	64,840

=== Game summaries ===
==== NFC Divisional Playoffs: at Dallas Cowboys ====
	1	2	3	4	Total
Buccaneers	0	0	0	0	0
Cowboys	0	10	21	7	38

January 2, 1982, at Texas Stadium, Irving, Texas

Facing a Dallas defense that had allowed its previous six opponents an average of less than ten points per game, the Buccaneers were in immediate trouble. Field position was a problem, with the Buccaneers' first-half drives starting at an average of the 19-yard line. Tampa Bay was only able to advance beyond midfield four times during the entire game, and Williams was pressured into mistakes by a constant Dallas pass rush. The ground game was held to only 2 yards in the second half, with James Owens starting at running back in place of the injured Jerry Eckwood. The Dallas front four of Ed "Too Tall" Jones, Harvey Martin, Randy White, and John Dutton dominated the Buccaneers' offensive line, moving them backwards with 59 yards in sacks and forcing two intentional grounding penalties. They batted down several of Williams' passes, and Jones caught one of Williams' four interceptions. Tom Landry said that it was the best performance by a Dallas front four since their Super Bowl XII victory over Denver in 1978, and credited their intensity for the difference. Interceptions by Jones and Michael Downs set up two third-quarter touchdowns, helping the Cowboys to match their largest-ever margin of victory. Dallas committed no turnovers, and all tipped passes wound up in the hands of Cowboys players. It was the last time that an NFL playoff team had been shut out since the Buccaneers' NFC Championship loss to the Los Angeles Rams in the 1979 postseason. McKay had few comments after the game, telling the press, "I want to get the hell out of here".

== Personnel ==
1981 Tampa Bay Buccaneers roster
Quarterbacks (QB): 10 Mike Ford; 14 Chuck Fusina; 12 Doug Williams; Running backs (RB): 42 Ricky Bell; 27 Tony Davis; 43 Jerry Eckwood; 26 James Owens; 32 James Wilder; Wide receivers (WR): 83 Theo Bell; 87 Gerald Carter; 89 Kevin House; 84 Gordon Jones; Tight ends (TE): 88 Jimmie Giles; 86 Jim Obradovich	Offensive linemen (OL): 73 Charley Hannah T; 62 Jim Leonard G/C; 75 Dave Reavis T; 61 Greg Roberts G; 74 Gene Sanders T; 72 Ray Snell G; 50 Steve Wilson C; 68 George Yarno G; Defensive linemen (DL): 79 Joe Campbell DE; 70 Scott Hutchinson DE; 76 David Logan NT; 63 Lee Roy Selmon DE; 64 Laval Short NT; 65 Dave Stalls DE; 90 Brad White NT	Linebackers (LB): 52 Scot Brantley ILB; 53 Hugh Green OLB; 59 Andy Hawkins OLB; 56 Cecil Johnson ILB; 57 Dave Lewis OLB; 51 Dana Nafziger OLB; 54 Richard Wood ILB; Defensive backs (DB): 34 Cedric Brown FS; 44 Billy Cesare FS; 20 Neal Colzie SS; 24 Jeff Delaney SS; 21 John Holt CB; 41 Norris Thomas CB; 40 Mike Washington CB; Special teams (ST): 3 Bill Capece K; 9 Larry Swider P	Reserve: 69 Darrell Austin T (IR); 91 David Clark DE (Left squad); 33 Mark Cotney S (IR); 71 Randy Crowder NT (IR); 85 Jackie Flowers WR (IR); 66 Steve Gettel G (Left squad); 77 Bill Kollar DE (IR); 67 Ken McCune DE (Left squad); 45 Aaron Mitchell S (IR); 80 Tony Samuels TE (IR); 58 Dewey Selmon LB (IR); 22 Johnny Ray Smith CB (IR); Rookies in italics Source

=== Coaching staff ===
1981 Tampa Bay Buccaneers staff
Front office: Owner – Hugh Culverhouse; Head coaches: Head coach – John McKay; Offensive coaches: Offensive line – Bill Johnson; Quarterbacks – Bill Nelsen; Receivers – Boyd Dowler; Running backs – George Chaump	Defensive coaches: Defensive coordinator – Tom Bass; Defensive line/chief assistant – Abe Gibron; Secondary – Wayne Fontes; Special teams/linebackers – Howard Tippett

== Awards and records ==
=== Postseason honors ===
Jimmie Giles, Pro Bowl starter, United Press International second-team All-Star
Lee Roy Selmon, Pro Bowl starter, Pro Bowl co-MVP (with Kellen Winslow)
Hugh Green, Pro Bowl first alternate
Greg Roberts, United Press International second-team All-Star
Hugh Green placed third (behind Lawrence Taylor and Ronnie Lott) in the Associated Press Defensive Rookie of the Year voting.

=== Records ===
Several individual and team records set in 1981 are still standing as of 2009:

- Most turnovers forced (46: 32 interceptions, 14 fumbles)
- Most receiving yards by a tight end (Jimmie Giles, 786)
- Longest reception by a tight end (Jimmie Giles, 81 yards vs. Chicago on 11/1, tied by Tyji Armstrong on 12/6/1992)
- Best average gain per play (5.43)
- Most passes attempted and completed in a game (63 and 37 vs. Minnesota on 9/5)
- Most passing first downs in a game (21, also vs. Minnesota)
- Most tackles by a rookie (Hugh Green, 151)
- Most single-game receptions by a rookie (James Wilder, 9 vs. St. Louis on 9/27)
- Most special teams tackles in a game (Dana Nafziger vs. Minnesota on 9/5, 6)
- Most passes completed by an opposing player (Steve Dils of Minnesota on 9/5, 62)
- Most pass receptions by an opposing player (set first by Ted Brown of Minnesota on 9/5 with 12, then by William Andrews of Atlanta on 12/6 with 13)
- Longest fumble return by an opposing player (George Cumby of Green Bay, 68 yards on 10/11)

Several other records established in 1981 have since been broken:

- Most total yardage (5,160, surpassed by 5,321 in 1984).
- Largest margin of victory (34 against Green Bay on 11/22, surpassed by 38 against Atlanta on 9/13/1987).
- Most return touchdowns (5, surpassed by 7 in 2000).
- Most individual interceptions (Cedric Brown with 9, broken by Ronde Barber's 10 in 2001).
- Most defensive touchdowns (2 by Cedric Brown tied Richard Wood's previous mark, broken by Wayne Haddix's 3 in 1990).
- Most interception return yards (215, by Cedric Brown; the team record until Haddix's 231 in 1990).
- Most yards per passing attempt (Doug Williams' 7.56 was the team record until Vinny Testaverde's 7.72 in 1990).
- Most yards per pass play (6.97 was their best until 1994).
- Longest punt return by an opposing player (Jeff Fisher's 88-yard touchdown for Chicago on September 20, broken by Phil Epps' 90-yard touchdown for Green Bay on October 2, 1983).
