= 1984 Tampa Bay Buccaneers season =

NFL team season

- Owner: Hugh Culverhouse
- Head coach: John McKay
- Home stadium: Tampa Stadium

Results
- Record: 6–10
- Division place: 3rd NFC Central
- Playoffs: Did not qualify
- All-Pros: RB James Wilder Sr. (2nd team)
- Pro Bowlers: 4: DE Lee Roy Selmon; RB James Wilder Sr.; NT David Logan (alternate); G Sean Farrell (alternate)
- Team MVP: RB James Wilder Sr.

The 1984 Tampa Bay Buccaneers season was the franchise's 9th season in the National Football League the 9th playing their home games at Tampa Stadium and the 9th and final season under head coach John McKay. They improved on their 2–14 season and finished 6–10, but missing the playoffs for the second straight season.

The team attempted to address the problems faced in the disappointing 1983 season. For the first time, the team renegotiated the contracts of players in their option years, which kept discontent over salaries to a minimum. An assistant coach was added to perform the functions of an offensive coordinator. A strength coach was added, which improved the players' physical conditioning in hopes of avoiding the constant injuries that occurred in 1983. A healthy, stable offensive lineup developed the maturity to sustain long drives in pressure situations, and head coach John McKay began to move away from his long-criticized conservative play-calling and open up the offense. This was the first time that the team's offense finished the season ranked higher than their defense. Their offensive output is still the third-highest in team history (as of 2010), and was not matched by another Buccaneer team until 2003.

James Wilder Sr., who Lawrence Taylor called "the best running back I've ever played against in my life", set team and NFL records while serving as the focal point of the team's offense. Steve DeBerg emerged as a stable, confidence-inspiring on-field leader. Kevin House continued to perform as one of the league's best wide receivers, while Gerald Carter emerged as a solid complement. Hugh Green, described by Mike Ditka as "one of the best two linebackers in the game" (with Lawrence Taylor), continued to dominate until sidelined by a midseason automobile accident. Dave Logan became the youngest of only four defensive linemen in NFL history to score four touchdowns, and began to be spoken of as a potential All-Pro until sore knees limited his movement later in the season. Lee Roy Selmon made the Pro Bowl in what would turn out to be his final season. However, as the team's best defensive players began to fall to injuries, they became prone to late-game collapses. In addition, the mental errors that had characterized the team from the outset contributed to a number of close losses. McKay experienced health problems during the season, and found the constant losing too much to bear. On November 5, the only coach in Buccaneer history announced that he would resign at the end of the season.

== Offseason ==
=== Coaching changes ===
When the Green Bay Packers' failure to make the playoffs resulted in the firing of coach Bart Starr and his entire staff, the Buccaneers hired John Brunner, the offensive backfield coach of the Packers' NFC-leading offense. McKay had stated previously that he would never hire an offensive coordinator, so Brunner was given the title "Offensive Moderator", although his duties were those of a coordinator. Defensive coordinator Wayne Fontes was promoted to assistant head coach, the first Buccaneer coach to be given such a title. This added administrative duties to his coordinator responsibilities and increased the perception that Fontes was being groomed to succeed McKay. McKay announced that all other assistants would be retained, with the exception of special teams coach Frank Emanuel, who had left to become defensive coordinator of the USFL Jacksonville Bulls. Emanuel's vacated position was filled by running backs coach Jim Gruden, then by former Buccaneer defensive tackle Bill Kollar when Gruden replaced Ken Herock as director of player personnel. Herock, who had been involved with Buccaneer scouting since 1976 and had worked with the Oakland Raiders before that, was given much of the credit for the expansion Buccaneers' quick rise to playoff contention. Nevertheless, he was rebuffed by team owner Hugh Culverhouse when he requested a pay raise, and accepted Howard Schnellenberger's offer to take the same position with the ill-fated USFL Washington Federals. Joe Diange was hired as a strength and conditioning coach, in hopes of avoiding a repeat of the previous season's rash of injuries.

=== Personnel changes ===
Star Canadian Football League quarterback Warren Moon met with the Buccaneers and was reportedly impressed with their organization, but eventually chose to sign with the Houston Oilers, where he reunited with his former Edmonton Eskimos coach Hugh Campbell. The team also attempted to sign Bobby Hebert, the Michigan Panthers quarterback who led the USFL in passing. The team was eventually able to obtain displaced Denver Broncos quarterback Steve DeBerg, who rejected a contract offer from the USFL Denver Gold. The free agent DeBerg signed with the Broncos, and was then traded to Tampa Bay for a pair of draft choices. The previous season's opening-day starting quarterback Jerry Golsteyn was released, then recalled and traded to the Los Angeles Raiders for defensive back Irvin Phillips.

Veteran fullback Scott Dierking was acquired from the New York Jets for a 1985 fifth-round draft choice. The team refused to honor Jimmie Giles' request to be traded, although he had reportedly been offered as trade bait at one point in the DeBerg deal. Giles' disgruntlement dissipated when the team offered him a new contract, signing him through the 1986 season. Obed Ariri, a former Chicago Sting soccer player who had set an NCAA record of 63 field goals at Clemson, was signed to compete with Bill Capece for the placekicker spot. Neal Colzie, the 1982 team MVP, was released before the start of training camp. McKay stated that the team did not have room for two older safeties, and felt that Colzie was being outperformed by Mark Cotney.

=== NFL draft ===
The previous season's trade for Jack Thompson left the team without a first-round pick, in a draft which had already been stripped of talent by USFL teams. The Los Angeles Express alone had signed seven players with first-round potential. Need areas were believed to include linebacker, the secondary, running backs, and the offensive line.

Pick	Round	Player	Position	School
30	2	Keith Browner	Linebacker	USC
57	3	Fred Acorn	Cornerback	Texas
107	4 (from San Diego)	Mike Gunter	Running back	Tulsa
112	4 (from the Raiders)	Ron Heller	Offensive tackle	Penn State
142	6	Chris Washington	Linebacker	Iowa State
169	7	Jay Carroll	Tight end	Minnesota
198	8	Fred Robinson	Defensive end	Miami (FL)
225	9	Rick Mallory	Guard	Washington
254	10	Jim Gallery	Kicker	Minnesota
281	11	Blair Kiel	Quarterback	Notre Dame
310	12	Thad Jemison	Wide receiver	Ohio State

==== Draft trades ====
The Buccaneers' 1st-round pick had been traded to the Cincinnati Bengals in exchange for quarterback Jack Thompson. Their 4th-round pick was traded to the San Francisco 49ers the previous year, in exchange for their 1983 6th-round pick. The first of their two 4th-round picks came from the San Diego Chargers, as part of the David Lewis trade. The second came from the Los Angeles Raiders, for Charley Hannah. A fourth 4th-round pick, obtained from San Diego for Dewey Selmon, was traded to the Denver Broncos in exchange for quarterback Steve DeBerg. Their 5th-round pick was traded to the Dallas Cowboys for linebacker Danny Spradlin.

==== Draft selections ====
The Buccaneers drafted USC linebacker Keith Browner with their first pick, the second pick of the second round. Brother of NFL players Ross and Joey Browner, Keith was considered to be a talented but underachieving college player who had been expected to be taken in the first round. Some observers questioned the selection of Browner, as Boomer Esiason, the only quarterback in the draft expected to have impact potential, was still available. With the secondary aging, the Buccaneers made Texas cornerback Fred Acorn the earliest-drafted defensive back in team history. Acorn was considered a project, as he started only one season for the Longhorns, but the Buccaneers' secondary was believed to be strong enough to afford the luxury of drafting a player who would take time to develop. Acorn was drafted for his speed, with a 40-yard dash time that had been clocked as low as 4.2 seconds. Mike Gunter, the Tulsa all-time rushing leader, was taken in the fourth round. He was another player who had been projected to be drafted much higher, as high as fourth overall, according to one publication. He was very productive as a college player, but was unproven as a receiver, and lacked the ability to evade tacklers or to accelerate at the line of scrimmage. Jim Gallery became the first kicker ever drafted by the team. The team approached the draft with a goal of improving overall speed, and felt that they'd achieved that with their selections of Acorn and the linebackers.

==== Supplemental draft ====
A special three-round draft was held on June 5, giving NFL teams an opportunity to select players who had not been in the draft due to having previously signed with USFL or CFL teams. With the first overall selection, the Buccaneers acquired the NFL rights to Los Angeles Express quarterback Steve Young. They later selected Express running back Kevin Nelson, and New Orleans Breakers cornerback Alex Clark. The pick gave the Buccaneers the rights to Young beyond the expiration of his Express contract, set to expire in November, 1987. Young expressed happiness at having been selected, but stated that he was committed to the Express and had no intention of leaving the team.

Pick	Round	Player	Position	School
1	1	Steve Young	Quarterback	BYU
30	2	Kevin Nelson	Runningback	UCLA
57	3	Alex Clark	Cornerback	LSU

== Preseason ==
A number of offseason personnel moves were taken as evidence that McKay was hoping to retire on a winning note, and so had lost tolerance for talented players who did not live up to their potential. He declared potential "dead on this team", and singled out Gene Branton and Ray Snell as players who were in danger of losing their roster spots. Longtime tight end Jim Obradovich, recently acquired cornerback Irvin Phillips, and the previous season's backup quarterback Bob Hewko were cut on the first day of training camp. One-time All-Rookie guard Snell was traded to the Pittsburgh Steelers for Steve Courson, an All-Pro alternate two seasons earlier. The injury-plagued Steelers had lost patience with Courson over a knee injury that had limited him to nine games the previous season. Courson passed his physical, but immediately underwent arthroscopic surgery that caused him to miss the preseason. Versatile defensive end Brison Manor was obtained from the Denver Broncos to provide depth, as Booker Reese failed to develop as hoped. Johnny Ray Smith was placed on injured reserve to make room for Perry Tuttle, a former first-round draft choice of the Buffalo Bills. The preseason was relatively free of contract disputes. David Logan was the only training camp holdout, and threatened retirement when the negotiations became difficult. Logan was also targeted (along with rookie Fred Acorn) by departed personnel director Ken Herock, by then with the Miami Federals of the USFL. A contract extension was agreed to with Hugh Green, preventing any risk of his signing with the USFL Houston Gamblers, who were owned by his agent Jerry Argovitz.

The Buccaneers opened the preseason with a 38–0 loss to the Seattle Seahawks, an AFC Championship Game contender of the previous season, in the Pro Football Hall of Fame Game. The game was marked by miscues, and was the largest margin of defeat in the game's 22-year history. Some players later expressed hope that the team would get "tired of losing", while McKay called the team's performance "disgusting". McKay did praise the efforts of the team's rookies, particularly Keith Browner, who was thrilled to be playing purely at linebacker after having been required to play at safety part-time at USC. James Wilder suffered a thigh bruise that kept him out of action for the remainder of the preseason. The team rebounded with a 30–17 win over the Houston Oilers, in which Warren Moon made his NFL debut. The low point of the preseason was a 52–21 loss to the Atlanta Falcons in which McKay rested the first-team defense for the entire game. Roster decisions were complicated by a number of injuries, particularly along the offensive line, where Steve Wilson and Steve Courson both missed significant time. The preseason ended with the defense playing in fine form in a 14–13 win over the Miami Dolphins, although McKay voiced concern over the performance of the offensive line and the running backs.

=== The end of the Booker Reese experiment ===
On May 30, underachieving defensive end Booker Reese was arrested for approaching a plainclothes Tampa police officer and soliciting her for prostitution. The team refused to comment on the situation, which was another embarrassment for the staff that had made such a large gamble by trading their 1983 first-round draft pick for the rights to draft him two years earlier. His lack of progress forced the team to trade for Brison Manor in the preseason, while Reese was given a brief tryout at nose tackle. Young and naive, Reese was vulnerable to ill-intentioned hangers-on, and developed a cocaine problem which escalated as the pressure on him increased. He was tall, fast, and strong, but lacked the quickness to be able to get around NFL tackles, and had trouble absorbing the mental aspects of the game. He was unable to beat out John Cannon, selected later in the same draft. The team eventually cut their losses by trading Reese to the Los Angeles Rams for a low-round draft pick. Reese recorded no tackles in two games with the Rams, before being sent to a rehabilitation program after failing a urine test.

== Regular season ==
McKay continued to express confidence in the team, despite an 0–2 start that left the team 2–16 over their last 18 games. He however expressed concern over the performance of the defense, who had failed to hold a lead the previous week, and failed to tackle Saints running back Hokie Gajan several times during a 51-yard run that set up a game-winning Saints touchdown. McKay pointed out that, despite the reputation of the Tampa Bay defense, this type of letdown had been seen in the past. The team then beat division opponents in three of their next four games, leading observers to consider them as contenders for the NFC Central title. With a healthy offensive line able to maintain a stable lineup, and DeBerg becoming better-acquainted with the receivers, the offense developed confidence and the ability to sustain long drives.

While the offense was able to avoid significant injuries, the defense began to lose key players from the beginning. Mike Washington, considered by McKay to be the team's best defensive back, was forced to retire after an elbow to the head by Bears receiver Dennis McKinnon in his first play of the season required him to undergo spinal surgery. This required the team to use rookie Fred Acorn as a nickel back. Hugh Green suffered a broken wrist and a broken orbital bone beneath his left eye in an October car crash. The injuries were initially expected to cause him to miss two games, but after a month, the Buccaneers decided to place him on injured reserve rather than face liability should an aggravation of the wrist injury end Green's career. Keith Browner played poorly as Green's replacement, and was promptly replaced by Chris Washington. Cecil Johnson suffered on and off from injuries and was eventually forced to undergo season-ending arthroscopic surgery, forcing the team to start two rookies (Browner and Washington) at outside linebacker. The pair struggled, with the speedy Washington overwhelmed by opposing tight ends, and the stronger Browner having trouble lining up in the right place. The loss of Green enabled opponents to play a more diverse offense, rather than avoid run plays to the left side, where Green and Lee Roy Selmon would line up. This affected the secondary, because the loss of Green's play against the run required that the team play the slower Mark Cotney for run support at safety. Making matters worse, Cedric Brown suffered a season-ending knee injury in week 9. McKay admitted that, with the absence of Brown, Green, Johnson, and Mike Washington, the Buccaneers were "not a very good defensive team".

Wayne Fontes' effort to create a more aggressive defense through increased reliance on man-to-man coverage and blitzes backfired, with the result that the defense became much more vulnerable to touchdown passes and long pass plays. At the same time, their interception total decreased. Cedric Brown observed that it was largely a problem of execution, as many blitzes were failing due to player errors, and that the team was making more mistakes than he had seen in any of his eight years there. The pass rush was weakened by the absence of Hugh Green, which was noticeable to opposing teams. The effectiveness of the defensive line was reduced: Booker Reese failed to develop, John Cannon regressed from his previous season's performance, and Dave Logan began to experience knee problems that sometimes required his replacement in the lineup.

=== The resignation of John McKay ===
McKay vowed during the offseason that he would retire rather than suffer another 2–14 season. During the season, he underwent surgery for cataracts that were making it difficult for him to read the game plans. He continued to express optimism over the season, even after a slow start and an embarrassing 44–9 loss to the Chicago Bears, as he felt that there was no dominant team in the division. McKay's wisecracking remark to a Kansas City Star reporter to the effect that a loss to the Chiefs would result in another Sam Rutigliano (the Cleveland Browns coach who had been fired the previous week) led to speculation of his imminent firing, which McKay shot down at the postgame press conference. The next week, the Buccaneers lost to the Minnesota Vikings on a last-minute field goal by Jan Stenerud, a kicker who McKay had pleaded with frugal owner Hugh Culverhouse to sign before the season. The loss effectively ended their chances at catching the Bears for the division lead. Frustrated over the team's record and concerned over his health, McKay held a press conference announcing his resignation effective at the end of the year. The players, who learned of the news from reporters rather than directly from McKay, were saddened by the announcement. Area fans, who had long been calling for McKay's resignation, were generally pleased by the decision. Howard Schnellenberger was the coach most popular among fans as a possible replacement, while Wayne Fontes was the popular choice among players and coaches, although Fontes was considered to be hampered by the perception that he would not be enough of a change, due to his 13 years of assistantship to McKay. Persistent rumors placed Ray Perkins as a candidate, even claiming that a press conference had been scheduled to announce the hiring, but Perkins dismissed the rumors and denied having met with Culverhouse.

The 0–26 franchise start had a dramatic impact on his career record. McKay finished his NFL career, spent entirely with the Buccaneers, with a record of 42–88–1. This was fourth-worst among the 60 NFL coaches with at least five years of experience, and worst among the 34 coaches who had coached at least 100 regular-season games. He also had the fourth-longest tenure among coaches with losing records. It had long been arranged that he would move into the front office on his resignation from coaching. As team president, he expressed a desire to help the team by "finding players who can compete in the National Football League", a shot at departed personnel director Ken Herock.

McKay's last weeks with the team were marked by controversy. Some players expressed support for McKay, and a team meeting was held on the day following the announcement in which players resolved to play together as a team, and finish the season on a winning note. The immediate result was a victory that ended their four-game losing streak, but more losses followed. The team was criticized for their decision to bench Hugh Green for the remainder of the season, despite his having been given clearance to play by doctors. The decision had to do with liability and the risk of a career-ending reinjury, but was perceived by fans as a lack of commitment to putting the best possible team on the field. Green eventually rejoined the lineup after signing a waiver absolving the team of liability. Team disunity arose after a collapse against the Packers, with much media attention being given to several players' complaints that McKay did not bother to address the team before, during, or after the game. McKay returned from Ricky Bell's funeral to find a storm of controversy over the incident, which was blamed on a lack of time due to equipment problems related to the muddy Green Bay field.

=== Final game 'Onside Kick' incident ===
The final game of the season, a 41–21 victory over the New York Jets, was notable for its series of onside kicks in an effort to secure the NFL record in (combined rushing and receiving) yards from scrimmage for running back James Wilder Sr. With 2,229 yards, Wilder was 16 short of the all-time NFL record, set by Eric Dickerson earlier during the weekend. McKay ordered an onside kick to try to get the ball back. When it was called back due to a penalty, he called another. The second attempt was also penalized, and he called a third. When the Jets recovered it, the defense (with the approval of McKay and Wayne Fontes) allowed Johnny Hector to score, so that the Buccaneers would get the ball back. On one play, Mark Cotney could be seen grabbing his helmet with both hands after tackling Hector, as instinct had prevented him from letting Hector score. This angered the Jets, who attempted an onside kick of their own to try to prevent the Buccaneers from getting the ball back. Tampa Bay did recover the kick, but the Jets focused on Wilder and prevented him from gaining any yards. New York players heaped profanities on McKay as the teams left the field, although Mark Gastineau apologized to Wilder for tackling him on the game's final play. Enraged Jets coach Joe Walton said that McKay's actions "set football back 20 years". Unapologetic for his decisions, McKay instead pointed to an earlier Jets onside kick attempt, and accused them of trying to slow down the game in an effort to thwart Wilder's pursuit of the record. He dismissed the Jets' argument that their only hope of winning was to recover the onside kick, saying that they had not seemed concerned about winning when they had been calling running plays while behind by 27 points. Wilder finished the season in third place, behind Dickerson and O. J. Simpson, in combined yardage. The NFL later fined McKay a record $10,000 for his actions.

=== Schedule ===
Week	Date	Opponent	Result	Game site	Attendance	Record
1	September 2	at **Chicago Bears**	L 34–14	Soldier Field	58,789	0–1
2	September 9	at New Orleans Saints	L 17–13	Louisiana Superdome	54,686	0–2
3	September 16	**Detroit Lions**	W 21–17	Tampa Stadium	44,560	1–2
4	September 23	at New York Giants	L 17–14	Giants Stadium	72,650	1–3
5	September 30	**Green Bay Packers**	W 30–27_{(OT)}	Tampa Stadium	44,487	2–3
6	October 7	**Minnesota Vikings**	W 35–31	Tampa Stadium	47,405	3–3
7	October 14	at **Detroit Lions**	L 13–7_{(OT)}	Pontiac Silverdome	44,308	3–4
8	October 21	**Chicago Bears**	L 44–9	Tampa Stadium	60,003	3–5
9	October 28	at Kansas City Chiefs	L 24–20	Arrowhead Stadium	41,710	3–6
10	November 4	at **Minnesota Vikings**	L 27–24	Hubert H. Humphrey Metrodome	54,949	3–7
11	November 11	New York Giants	W 20–17	Tampa Stadium	46,534	4–7
12	November 18	at San Francisco 49ers	L 24–17	Candlestick Park	57,704	4–8
13	November 25	Los Angeles Rams	L 34–33	Tampa Stadium	42,242	4–9
14	December 2	at **Green Bay Packers**	L 27–14	Lambeau Field	46,800	4–10
15	December 9	Atlanta Falcons	W 23–6	Tampa Stadium	33,808	5–10
16	December 16	New York Jets	W 41–21	Tampa Stadium	43,817	6–10

Notes:

- Division opponents in **bold** text.

=== Standings ===
NFC Central
	W	L	T	PCT	DIV	CONF	PF	PA	STK
^{(3)} Chicago Bears	10	6	0	.625	7–1	8–4	325	248	W1
Green Bay Packers	8	8	0	.500	5–3	8–4	390	309	W3
Tampa Bay Buccaneers	6	10	0	.375	3–5	5–9	335	380	W2
Detroit Lions	4	11	1	.281	3–5	4–7–1	283	408	L3
Minnesota Vikings	3	13	0	.188	2–6	3–9	276	484	L6

== Personnel ==
=== Staff / Coaches ===
Tampa Bay Buccaneers 1984 coaching staff
**Front office**: Owner – Hugh Culverhouse; Director of player personnel – Jim Gruden; **Head coaches**: Head coach – John McKay; **Offensive coaches**: Offensive moderator – John Brunner; Offensive line – Kim Helton; Quarterbacks – Boyd Dowler; Receivers – Chip Myers	**Defensive coaches**: Assistant head coach/defensive coordinator/secondary – Wayne Fontes; Defensive line – Abe Gibron; Linebackers – Howard Tippett; Kicking teams – Bill Kollar; Strength – Joe Diange

=== Final roster ===
Tampa Bay Buccaneers 1984 roster
**Quarterbacks**: 17 **Steve DeBerg**; 14 Jack Thompson; **Running backs**: 46 **Adger Armstrong**; 29 Leon Bright; 25 Scott Dierking; 1 Michael Morton; 38 George Peoples; 32 **James Wilder**; **Wide receivers**: 83 Theo Bell; 87 **Gerald Carter**; 81 Dwayne Dixon; 89 **Kevin House**; 84 Zach Thomas; **Tight ends**: 82 **Jerry Bell**; 86 Jay Carroll; 88 **Jimmie Giles**; 85 Mark Witte	**Offensive linemen**: 77 Glenn Bujnoch G; 72 **Steve Courson** LG; 62 **Sean Farrell** RG; 60 Randy Grimes C; 73 **Ron Heller** RT; 79 Ken Kaplan T; 74 **Gene Sanders** LT; 70 Kelly Thomas T; 50 **Steve Wilson** C; **Defensive linemen**: 71 Byron Braggs DE; 78 **John Cannon** LDE; 76 **David Logan** NT; 67 Karl Morgan NT; 63 **Lee Roy Selmon** RDE	**Linebackers**: 52 **Scot Brantley** LILB; 57 **Keith Browner** LOLB; 58 **Jeff Davis** LILB; 53 **Hugh Green** ROLB; 55 Danny Spradlin ILB; 59 Robert Thompson OLB; 51 **Chris Washington** ROLB; 54 Richard Wood ILB; **Defensive backs**: 27 Fred Acorn CB; 23 **Jeremiah Castille** LCB; 44 **Mark Cotney** SS; 31 Craig Curry FS; 24 Maurice Harvey SS; 21 **John Holt** RCB; 43 **Beasley Reece** FS/SS; 41 Norris Thomas CB; **Special teams**: 2 Obed Ariri K; 5 Frank Garcia P	**Reserve lists**: 80 Gene Branton WR (IR); 34 **Cedric Brown** S (IR); 28 Melvin Carver RB (IR); 75 Phil Darns DE (IR); 56 **Cecil Johnson** LB (IR); 16 Blair Kiel QB (NF-Ill.); 7 Jeff Komlo QB (IR); 68 Rick Mallory G (IR); 26 James Owens RB (IR); -- Don Swafford T (IR); -- Andre Tyler WR (IR); 40 Mike Washington CB (IR); 49 active, 12 inactive, 0 practice squad rookies in italics **Starters in boldface**

== Game summaries ==
=== Week 1: at Chicago Bears ===
	1	2	3	4	Total
Buccaneers	0	7	0	7	14
Bears	3	10	14	7	34

Sep 2, 1984 at Soldier Field, Chicago

Tampa Bay put on a mistake-filled performance reminiscent of the 1983 season, with a team-record eight turnovers. Dave Logan was called offsides twice on the Bears' first possession, which ended in a punt that Theo Bell fumbled. The team controlled the ball for less than three minutes of the first quarter. A potential touchdown pass was dropped by Jimmie Giles, and intercepted by Gary Fencik in what McKay felt was the turning point of the game. Jack Thompson completed only 4 of 17 passes and threw two interceptions. He was replaced by Steve DeBerg in the fourth quarter, as he was beginning to show signs of nervousness due to the receivers dropping so many of his passes. DeBerg threw four more interceptions, including one on the final play of the game. Thompson did find Gerald Carter for a 74-yard touchdown pass early in the second quarter, causing McKay to comment that it was a good thing that Carter's contract had not been renegotiated, as the recently re-signed and highly paid Giles and Kevin House were dropping so many passes.

Original Buccaneer Mike Washington was knocked out by Dennis McKinnon on his first play of the game, and held at a hospital for observation with what was later described as a "significant" neck injury. He was placed in a cervical collar, and went on injured reserve. Washington suffered two ruptured discs that later required career-ending surgery. The Buccaneers maintained that McKinnon's play was illegal, as film appeared to show him jumping off the ground for extra leverage while delivering a forearm strike to Washington's head.

=== Week 2: at New Orleans Saints ===
	1	2	3	4	Total
Buccaneers	7	3	3	0	13
Saints	0	7	3	7	17

Sep 9, 1984 at Louisiana Superdome, New Orleans

The New Orleans Saints defense, ranked first in the league the previous year, sacked Jack Thompson seven times and held James Wilder to 75 yards rushing, 37 of which came on a single carry. Thompson nevertheless completed 15 of 22 passes for 175 yards, and led a 10-minute opening drive that ended in an 8-yard pass to Adger Armstrong. He also completed four consecutive passes at the end of the fourth quarter, leading the team downfield for a comeback attempt that failed when the Saints' defense rallied. The Buccaneers led for most of the game, but the Saints came back following a 51-yard Hokie Gajan sideline run in the final two minutes. Several Buccaneer defenders missed opportunities to tackle him, as they expected him to try to run out of bounds to stop the clock. Gajan rushed the remaining 13 yards to the goal line in the next two plays to score the go-ahead touchdown. Obed Ariri was successful on his first two NFL field goal attempts. Tampa Bay committed no turnovers, after the previous week's total of eight.

=== Week 3 vs Lions ===
Week Three: Detroit Lions (1–1) at Tampa Bay Buccaneers (0–2)

Quarter	1	2	3	4	Total
Lions	7	7	3	0	17
Buccaneers	0	7	7	7	21

at Tampa Stadium • Tampa, Florida

- Date: September 16
- Game time: 4:00 pm. EDT
- Game weather: 81 °F (27 °C) • Wind 7 miles per hour (11 km/h; 6.1 kn)
- Game attendance: 44,560
- Referee: Jerry Markbreit
- TV: CBS
- Pro-Football-Reference.com, The Football Database

Game information

Lions

- Gary Danielson
  15/36, 176 Yds, TD
- Billy Sims
  11 Rush, 39 Yds
- James Jones
  5 Rec, 40 Yds

Buccaneers

- Steve DeBerg
  18/27, 195 Yds, 2 TD
- James Wilder
  22 Rush, 89 Yds, TD
- Kevin House
  4 Rec, 79 Yds

Promised lineup changes after the previous week's loss to the Saints included Steve Courson and Ron Heller moving into the starting lineup at left guard and right tackle, respectively. Steve DeBerg entered the game in the second quarter, with Jack Thompson struggling and the Buccaneers behind 14–0. DeBerg led a 67-yard scoring drive on his first series, and went on to complete 18 of 27 passes for 195 yards and two touchdowns, a performance for which he was named NFC Player of the Week. He threw a 5-yard touchdown to Jimmie Giles to score the winning points with 3:11 remaining.

Scoring summary

Quarter	Time	Drive			Team	Scoring information	Score	
Quarter	Time	Plays	Yards	TOP	Team	Scoring information	DET	TB
1	13:14				Lions	Mark Nichols 77-yard touchdown reception from Gary Danielson, Eddie Murray kick good	7	0
2	7:46				Lions	Gary Danielson 4-yard touchdown run, Eddie Murray kick good	14	0
2	2:54				Buccaneers	Gerald Carter 5-yard touchdown reception from Steve DeBerg, Obed Ariri kick good	14	7
3	6:10				Buccaneers	James Wilder 2-yard touchdown run, Obed Ariri kick good	14	14
3	3:50				Lions	28-yard field goal by Eddie Murray	17	14
4	3:11				Buccaneers	Jimmie Giles 5-yard touchdown reception from Steve DeBerg, Obed Ariri kick good	17	21
"TOP" = time of possession. For other American football terms, see Glossary of American football.							17	21

=== Week 4: at New York Giants ===
	1	2	3	4	Total
Buccaneers	0	0	7	7	14
Giants	0	10	0	7	17

Sep 23, 1984 at Giants Stadium, East Rutherford, New Jersey

The Buccaneers failed to account for Lawrence Taylor, who got three of the Giants' four first-half sacks. Steve DeBerg completed 18 of 31 passes for 229 yards in his first Buccaneer start. The Buccaneers scored on runs by James Wilder and Adger Armstrong, while Phil Simms threw touchdown passes to Bobby Johnson and Zeke Mowatt for the Giants. James Owens was placed on injured reserve after suffering a knee injury on a kick return. Cecil Johnson suffered a back injury. Keith Browner got his first career start as Johnson's replacement the following week.

=== Week 5: vs Green Bay Packers ===
	1	2	3	4	OT	Total
Packers	10	3	7	7	0	27
Buccaneers	7	10	0	10	3	30

Sep 30, 1984 at Tampa Stadium, Tampa, Florida

James Wilder rushed 43 times for 172 yards, tying Butch Woolfolk's year-old NFL record for single-game carries, and breaking Wilder's own team mark of 42. He became the only running back in NFL history to have at least forty single-game carries on more than one occasion. His four receptions for 44 yards put him in first place in the league for total yards from scrimmage. The Buccaneers appeared to have the game put away until Lynn Dickey hit James Lofton at the Packer 16-yard line. Although Lofton was in the grasp of Jeremiah Castille, he was able to lateral the ball to Gerry Ellis, who scored the tying touchdown with 21 seconds left. The game was marked by big plays from the Buccaneer defense. Castille intercepted a pass that bounced off of Cecil Johnson's helmet, one of several Buccaneer takeaways. Dave Logan broke up a fourth-quarter tie by intercepting a Lynn Dickey pass and returning it for a touchdown. Logan later assisted Jeff Davis on a tackle of Ray Crouse for a loss on fourth-and-one. This in turn influenced Packers coach Forrest Gregg's decision to punt on fourth-and-one in overtime, with Gregg admitting to feeling intimidated by the Tampa Bay defense. The decision seemed justified when Bucky Scribner punted the ball to the Tampa Bay 2-yard line, but neither team was able to advance the ball on their ensuing possessions. The Buccaneers eventually drove to the Packer 17-yard line, where McKay elected to try to gain more yardage instead of attempting an immediate field goal. This decision almost backfired due to consecutive 10-yard penalties on Jimmie Giles and Gerald Carter, but Obed Ariri was successful on a 48-yard game-winning field goal attempt. Ariri became the first Buccaneer kicker to make three field goals of over 40 yards in a single game. As all other NFC Central teams lost that weekend, the victory moved Tampa Bay into a second-place tie with the Minnesota Vikings. Wilder was later named NFL Offensive Player of the Week for his performance.

=== Week 6: vs Minnesota Vikings ===
	1	2	3	4	Total
Vikings	14	7	0	10	31
Buccaneers	7	14	7	7	35

Oct 7, 1984, at Tampa Stadium, Tampa, Florida

The Buccaneers gave up record amounts of yardage to the Vikings, but stayed in the game by capitalizing on Viking turnovers. The Vikings' 543 yards and Tommy Kramer's 386 passing yards were the most ever gained against Tampa Bay in a regulation game. Leading 21–7, Kramer gave up an interception and a fumble in quick succession, each time giving the Buccaneers the ball inside the Viking 15-yard line and allowing them to easily tie the score. The Vikings committed 13 penalties for 101 yards. A Viking penalty for having 12 men on the field during a punt attempt gave Tampa Bay fourth-and-2 at the Viking 31, which led to the Buccaneers' first touchdown. Viking guard Ron Sams, filling in at center, was overwhelmed by Dave Logan and was called for holding five times. Logan got past him for sacks two other times. Kevin House had his ninth 100-yard game, with seven catches for 126 yards and a touchdown. Scot Brantley suffered a knee injury, while Sammy White and Darrin Nelson both pulled hamstrings.

=== Week 7: at Detroit Lions ===
	1	2	3	4	OT	Total
Buccaneers	7	0	0	0	0	7
Lions	0	7	0	0	6	13

Oct 14, 1984, at Pontiac Silverdome, Pontiac, Michigan

Gary Danielson, who had taken no snaps in practice during the week, came off the bench to lead the Lions to a come-from-behind victory. Danielson had been infuriated earlier in the week when coach Monte Clark started Eric Hipple ahead of him, saying that Danielson had a calf injury. Danielson was healthy and had one of the league's best passer ratings, but it was believed that the Lions expected the Buccaneers' banged-up linebacker corps to be vulnerable to Hipple's scrambling. When Hipple suffered a second-quarter knee injury, Danielson tied the game with an 18-yard run. He then threw a 37-yard overtime pass to Leonard Thompson to win the game. The Lions' 1–5 record, combined with the Detroit Tigers' pennant contention, contributed to the Silverdome attendance of 44,308 that was over 10,000 fewer than the stadium's previous record low. Steve DeBerg completed 25 of 29 passes for 272 yards, including a team-record streak of 12 consecutive completions. He threw a 25-yard first-quarter touchdown to Kevin House, and threw no interceptions. Numerous mistakes limited Tampa Bay to a single touchdown, despite their 349 yards of total offense. On one occasion, pulling guard Noah Jackson knocked the ball out of DeBerg's hand before he could hand it off to James Wilder, with the Lions recovering the fumble. The game went into overtime when Obed Ariri missed a potential game-winning 42-yard field goal on the last play of the fourth quarter. An overtime scoring opportunity ended with a Wilder fumble at the Lions 39-yard line.

=== Week 8: vs Chicago Bears ===
	1	2	3	4	Total
Bears	14	6	7	17	44
Buccaneers	0	3	0	6	9

Oct 21, 1984, at Tampa Stadium, Tampa, Florida

A season-high crowd of 60,003 showed up to watch what turned out to be the Buccaneers' worst defeat in Tampa Stadium history. Walter Payton was held short of his seventh consecutive 100-yard-rushing game, but scored two touchdowns. Jim McMahon threw touchdowns to Dennis McKinnon, Willie Gault, and Brad Anderson. Dennis Gentry contributed a five-yard touchdown run, and Bob Thomas kicked a field goal. Gerald Carter had his first 100-yard receiving game for the Buccaneers, catching 10 passes for 109 yards. The Buccaneers were called for 11 penalties in the first half alone, including a pass-interference call on Jeremiah Castille that set up Payton's second touchdown. The play-calling was criticized, particularly a failed handoff to Wilder on fourth-and-1 in the first quarter, at the Buccaneer 45-yard line. The early deficit forced the Buccaneers into a passing game, which negated Wilder, their best offensive threat. Several Bears attributed Tampa Bay's penalty-prone play to overaggressiveness, possibly motivated by revenge due to McKinnon's career-ending hit on Mike Washington in the season opener. They also noted that the Buccaneer defense played very differently without Hugh Green.

=== Week 9: at Kansas City Chiefs ===
	1	2	3	4	Total
Buccaneers	0	7	6	7	20
Chiefs	0	7	7	10	24

Oct 28, 1984, at Arrowhead Stadium, Kansas City, Missouri

The Buccaneers lost a chance to pull out a last-minute win, as Steve DeBerg's last-second pass to a triple-covered Gerald Carter was tipped in the end zone. DeBerg had led the team on a 3-minute, 82-yard drive to the Chiefs' 10-yard line, only to be sacked for a 10-yard loss when he fell after an offensive lineman stepped on his foot. DeBerg completed 29 of 54 passes for 280 yards, with two touchdowns and three interceptions. The two teams' quarterbacks combined for 100 pass attempts, the most ever in an NFL game. DeBerg also set a club record, with his sixth-straight 200-yard passing game. James Wilder finished the game just two yards shy of the club record in yards from scrimmage. McKay was critical of Red Cashion's officiating crew after three questionable calls. On one, Stephone Paige apparently fumbled after being hit by Cedric Brown and Jeremiah Castille at the 2-yard line, but the play was ruled an incomplete pass by the official. On the next play, Brown suffered a season-ending knee injury while blitzing Bill Kenney. This play resulted in a touchdown pass to Henry Marshall.

=== Week 10: at Minnesota Vikings ===
	1	2	3	4	Total
Buccaneers	7	7	0	10	24
Vikings	3	7	7	10	27

Nov 4, 1984 at Hubert H. Humphrey Metrodome, Minneapolis, Minnesota

The Buccaneers could not defeat a struggling Vikings team, despite James Wilder's 146 rushing and 46 receiving yards, and a Steve DeBerg touchdown pass to Kevin House that tied the score with 1:03 remaining in the game. The Vikings were held to an incompletion on fourth-and-nine on their ensuing possession, but a pass-interference penalty on Chris Washington allowed the Vikings to retain possession, and set up Jan Stenerud's game-winning field goal with 2 seconds left.

=== Week 11: vs New York Giants ===
	1	2	3	4	Total
Giants	3	0	7	7	17
Buccaneers	0	3	7	10	20

Nov 11, 1984 at Tampa Stadium, Tampa, Florida

The Buccaneers shocked a Giants team that had taken a share of the NFC East lead by beating the Cowboys and Redskins in the two previous weeks. Inspired by a team meeting in which the players resolved to fight to maintain their respectability as a team, the Buccaneers shut down the Giants' deep passing game and held Lawrence Taylor in check, producing a win that only appeared close because of a last-minute Giants touchdown. James Wilder's 99 yards on 34 carries gave him 1,062 for the season, making him only the second 1,000-yard rusher in Buccaneer history. Steve DeBerg threw for 238 yards, including a 10-yard touchdown pass to Kevin House. Giants players refused to admit to having suffered a letdown, instead crediting the Buccaneers with having played a better game.

=== Week 12: at San Francisco 49ers ===
Week 12: Tampa Bay Buccaneers at San Francisco 49ers

Quarter	1	2	3	4	Total
Buccaneers (4–8)	0	10	0	7	17
49ers (11–1)	0	14	7	3	24

at Candlestick Park • San Francisco, California

- Date: November 18, 1984
- Game time: 4:01 p.m. EST
- Game weather: 56 °F (13 °C); wind 14 miles per hour (23 km/h; 12 kn)
- Game attendance: 57,704
- Referee: Tom Dooley
- TV announcers (CBS): Tom Brookshier (play-by-play) and Wayne Walker (color commentator)

Team	Category	Player	Statistics
TB	Passing	Steve DeBerg	26/41, 316 YDS, 2 TDs, 2 INTs
TB	Rushing	James Wilder Sr.	18 CAR, 89 YDS
TB	Receiving	Gerald Carter	9 REC, 166 YDS, 1 TD
SF	Passing	Joe Montana	19/23, 247 YDS
SF	Rushing	Wendell Tyler	16 CAR, 97 YDS, 1 TD
SF	Receiving	Dwight Clark	5 REC, 56 YDS

Scoring summary

Quarter	Time	Drive			Team	Scoring information	Score	
Quarter	Time	Plays	Yards	TOP	Team	Scoring information	TB	SF
2	10:44	7	44	3:21	49ers	Craig 2-yard touchdown run, Wersching kick good	0	7
2	7:13	8	69	3:31	Buccaneers	27-yard field goal by Ariri	3	7
2	10:56	9	80	4:07	49ers	Solomon 4-yard touchdown run, Wersching kick good	3	14
2	0:49	8	80	2:17	Buccaneers	Giles 9-yard touchdown reception from DeBerg, Ariri kick good	10	14
3	4:06	10	92	6:16	49ers	Tyler 1-yard touchdown run, Wersching kick good	10	21
4	12:39	11	83	6:27	Buccaneers	Carter 9-yard touchdown reception from DeBerg, Ariri kick good	17	21
4	8:39	7	46	4:00	49ers	39-yard field goal by Wersching	17	24
"TOP" = time of possession. For other American football terms, see Glossary of American football.							17	24

- Point spread: 49ers by 12
- Over/under: 40.0 (over)
- Time of game: 2 hours, 52 minutes

Buccaneers	Game statistics	49ers
23	First downs	25
20–89	Rushes–yards	38–190
316	Passing yards	247
26–41–2	Passes	19–23–0
1–8	Sacked–yards	2–9
308	Net passing yards	238
397	Total yards	428
61	Return yards	99
3–41.0	Punts	2–48.0
2–1	Fumbles–lost	3–3
7–38	Penalties–yards	3–35
28:17	Time of Possession	31:43

The 49ers scored on runs by Roger Craig, Wendell Tyler, and Freddie Solomon. The Buccaneers kept pace behind Steve DeBerg's 316 yards passing. Gerald Carter caught nine of DeBerg's passes, for 166 yards. A last-minute chance to tie the score ended when San Francisco's Gary Johnson recovered a fumbled center snap. The 49ers became the first NFC playoff qualifiers with the win, while the loss eliminated Tampa Bay from playoff contention. James Wilder broke the team record for total yardage in a season.

=== Week 13: vs Los Angeles Rams ===
	1	2	3	4	Total
Rams	0	10	7	17	34
Buccaneers	9	7	10	7	33

Nov 25, 1984 at Tampa Stadium, Tampa, Florida

Gary Jeter blocked an extra-point attempt in the first quarter, which became the Rams' margin of victory when they staged a fourth-quarter rally. Eric Dickerson was held to 67 yards rushing through the first three periods, but rushed for 124 yards in the final quarter, leading his team to a comeback from a 26–17 deficit. The game left Dickerson just 372 yards short of O. J. Simpson's NFL single-season rushing record of 2,003 yards. The Buccaneers had to settle for a field goal on their opening drive, when officials ruled a bobbled Gerald Carter end-zone reception to be incomplete. Game films later indicated that Carter did indeed catch the pass. A last-minute Buccaneer drive ended when LeRoy Irvin intercepted a pass intended for Theo Bell. While the Buccaneer offense produced 406 yards and a team-record 28 first downs, the defense allowed 299 rushing yards.

This was the 200th consecutive game that Rams linebacker Jack Youngblood, an eventual inductee into the Professional Football Hall of Fame, played in. He suffered an injury to his sciatic nerve during the second quarter that ended his season, and ultimately his career. His Rams-record consecutive-game streak of 201 games, which included two playoff games played with a broken leg (including the 1979 playoff game against Tampa Bay) ended after a brief appearance the following week, and he would never again play in an NFL game.

=== Week 14: at Green Bay Packers ===
	1	2	3	4	Total
Buccaneers	0	7	7	0	14
Packers	0	0	7	20	27

Dec 2, 1984 at Lambeau Field, Green Bay, Wisconsin

The Packers were held scoreless for the first half, but scored 27 unanswered points after a 17-yard Paul Coffman pass reception inspired the team. It took eight Buccaneers to bring Coffman down, and the reception set up a 4-yard Eddie Lee Ivery touchdown run. Coffman was awarded a game ball for the effort. Before that, the Packers dropped numerous passes and allowed the Buccaneers to take a 14–0 lead. The Buccaneers also missed scoring opportunities, with a fumble on the 6-yard line, and a field goal attempt in which Obed Ariri slipped twice before missing the kick. James Wilder rushed for 84 first-half yards, and threw his first career pass, a touchdown to Adger Armstrong. The Green Bay crowd spent the game taunting McKay, who during the week had expressed his distaste for the city, saying that a trip to Green Bay would be the 98th prize in a contest that had 97 prizes, and that nobody should have to go there in July, let alone December.

A small black No. 42 was worn on the Buccaneer helmets for the game in tribute to former running back Ricky Bell, who had died earlier in the week.

=== Week 15: vs Atlanta Falcons ===
	1	2	3	4	Total
Falcons	0	6	0	0	6
Buccaneers	3	10	7	3	23

Dec 9, 1984 at Tampa Stadium, Tampa, Florida

James Wilder rushed for 125 yards and caught passes for 22 yards, in so doing becoming only the seventh player in NFL history to gain 2,000 yards in a season. His total of 2,066 yards was only 177 short of O. J. Simpson's NFL record of 2,243, with one game remaining. McKay later stated that he would incorporate new plays into the following week's game plan, in an effort to help Wilder break Simpson's record.

The Falcons used a deep zone to neutralize receivers Gerald Carter and Kevin House, allowing Theo Bell to catch four passes for 80 yards. Three of Bell's receptions came on third downs, extending Buccaneer drives. Several other Buccaneers reached milestones: Obed Ariri set the team's season scoring record, Steve DeBerg reached 15,000 career passing yards, and Fred Acorn caught his first interception. Atlanta's Gerald Riggs, the third-leading rusher in the NFL, was held to 53 yards on 15 carries. Mike Moroski started at quarterback for the Falcons in place of the injured Steve Bartkowski. The Buccaneer defense played well enough to stifle any comeback attempts by the Falcons, who had not won a game since a season-ending injury to Billy "White Shoes" Johnson eight weeks earlier. The game was played in front of a record-low Tampa Stadium crowd of 33,808.

=== Week 16: vs New York Jets ===
	1	2	3	4	Total
Jets	0	7	0	14	21
Buccaneers	10	7	3	21	41

Dec 16, 1984 at Tampa Stadium, Tampa, Florida

In Tampa Bay's final game with John McKay as coach, the team broke numerous team and individual offensive records en route to a victory over the New York Jets. The victory was considered tainted, due to a controversial decision to permit the Jets to score a fourth-quarter touchdown in order that the Buccaneers could get the ball back in an attempt to help James Wilder break the NFL record in yards from scrimmage. The team's 41 points were their most ever, while they broke season records for points, yards, passing yards, passing touchdowns and rushing touchdowns. Kevin House became the only Buccaneer with two 1,000-yard receiving seasons, while four different receivers broke the team record of 57 receptions. Steve DeBerg set several quarterback records, and Obed Ariri set a team mark with his 19th field goal. House and Gerald Carter's combined 176 catches was the most by any NFL receiving duo, although Mark Clayton and Mark Duper had an opportunity to pass them, with one game yet to play.

== Awards and records ==
=== Postseason honors ===
James Wilder, Pro Bowl selection
Lee Roy Selmon, Pro Bowl selection
Dave Logan, Pro Bowl first alternate
Sean Farrell, Pro Bowl second alternate
Kevin House, Pro Bowl second alternate
Hugh Green, Pro Bowl second alternate
Gerald Carter, Pro Bowl third alternate
James Wilder, team MVP
Ron Heller, UPI All-Rookie Team
Keith Browner, UPI All-Rookie Team

=== Team and individual records ===
The 1984 offense was one of the highest-performing in franchise history, and set numerous team records, many of which still (as of 2010) stand:

James Wilder, most NFL season rushing attempts (407, surpassed Eric Dickerson's NFL-record 390 set in 1983)
James Wilder, most NFL single-game rushing attempts (43, tied Butch Woolfolk's NFL record set in 1983)
James Wilder, most team season rushing yards (1,544)
James Wilder, most team total yards, rushing and receiving (2,229; 1,544 rushing, 685 receiving)
James Wilder, most team season rushing touchdowns (13)
James Wilder, most team 100-yard rushing games (5, broken by Carnell Williams in 2005). This was a regular-season record, as it had previously been achieved by Ricky Bell in the 1979 playoffs.
Steve DeBerg, most team passes completed (308, broken by Brad Johnson in 2001)
Steve DeBerg, highest team season passer rating (79.3, since broken by several others)
Steve DeBerg, highest team single-game completion percentage (86.2% vs. Detroit on 10/14, broken by Vinny Testaverde on 9/13/92)
Steve DeBerg, highest team season completion percentage (60.5%, since broken several times)
James Wilder, most team pass receptions (85, broken by Mark Carrier in 1989)
James Wilder, most receptions, running back (85)
James Wilder, most receiving yards, running back (685)
Team, most season points scored (335, broken in 2000)
Team, most single-game points scored (41 vs. N. Y. Jets on 12/16, broken on 9/13/87 vs. Atlanta)
Team, most touchdowns (40, broken in 2000)
Team, most season passing touchdowns (22, broken in 1989)
Team, most total yards, offense (5,321, broken in 2003)
Team, most offensive plays (1,091)
Team, most single-game offensive plays (91 vs. Green Bay on 9/30. 79 of these were in regulation)
Team, most single-game offensive plays during regulation (87 vs. Kansas City on 10/28)
Team, most first downs (344)
Team, most season rushing first downs (114)
Team, most single-game rushing first downs (16, vs. Detroit on 9/16, since matched twice)
Team, most passing first downs (209)
Team, best third down efficiency (42.9%)
Team, most passes attempted (563, broken in 1989)
Team, best single-game passing completion percentage (86.2% at Detroit on 10/14)
Team, most net yards passing (3,545, broken in 2003)
Team, most single-game yards passing in a regulation game (374 vs. Minnesota on 10/7, broken vs. N.Y. Jets on 11/17/85)
Team, most single-game penalties (16, vs. Chicago on 10/21)
Both teams, most single-game pass attempts (100, with Kansas City on 10/28 at the time an NFL record; broken vs. Chicago on 9/21/08)
Most opponent penalties (136)
Most single-game opponent penalties (16, vs. Chicago on 10/21)
Most opponent penalty yards (1,078)
Fewest punts (68)
Best opponent passing completion percentage (82.6% by Joe Montana of San Francisco on 11/18, broken by Randall Cunningham of Minnesota on 11/1/98)
Most opponent rushing yards (299 by L.A. Rams on 11/25, broken by Atlanta on 9/17/06)
Longest game (4:02 vs. Green Bay on 9/30)
Longest touchdown drive (19 plays in 10:26 at New Orleans on 9/9)
Steve DeBerg's 3,554 yards passing and James Wilder's 85 receptions are currently the third-highest in team history. Kevin House's 76 receptions are ninth-most in team history. Obed Ariri's 95 points and Steve DeBerg's passer rating of 79.3 rank tenth.
