= Jay Carroll =

American football player (born 1961)

No. 84, 86
- Position: Tight end

Personal information
- Born: November 8, 1961 (age 64); Winona, Minnesota, U.S.
- Listed height: 6 ft 4 in (1.93 m)
- Listed weight: 230 lb (104 kg)

Career information
- High school: Cotter (Winona)
- College: Minnesota (1980–1983)
- NFL draft: 1984: 7th round, 169th overall pick

Career history
- Tampa Bay Buccaneers (1984); Minnesota Vikings (1985)

Career NFL statistics
- Receptions: 6
- Receiving yards: 58
- Receiving touchdowns: 1
- Stats at Pro Football Reference

Jay Timothy Carroll (born November 8, 1961) is an American former professional football player who was a tight end in the National Football League (NFL) for the Tampa Bay Buccaneers and the Minnesota Vikings. He played college football for the Minnesota Golden Gophers.

== Professional career ==
=== Tampa Bay Buccaneers ===
Carroll was selected by the Tampa Bay Buccaneers in the seventh round, with the 169th overall pick, of the 1984 NFL draft. He officially signed with the team on June 21. Carroll appeared in all games of his rookie for the Buccaneers and logged five receptions for 50 yards and one touchdown. He scored his only career score in the Week 16 game against the New York Jets, catching a four-yard pass from quarterback Steve DeBerg. Carroll was released from the Buccaneers on September 2, 1985.

=== Minnesota Vikings ===
On September 3, 1985, the Minnesota Vikings picked Carroll off of waivers. Carroll played in all 16 games for the Vikings and recorded one catch for eight yards in the Week 4 win against the Buffalo Bills. He would stay on the team until August 26, 1986, when he was released from the Vikings.

== NFL career statistics ==
Year	Team	Games		Receiving					Fumbles	
Year	Team	GP	GS	Rec	Yds	Avg	Lng	TD	Fum	Lost
1984	TB	16	2	5	50	10.0	17	1	0	0
1985	MIN	16	0	1	8	8.0	8	0	0	0
Career		32	2	6	58	9.0	25	1	0	0

== Personal life ==
Carroll has seven children. Quinn, played for the Notre Dame Fighting Irish from 2019 to 2021 and the Minnesota Golden Gophers from 2022 to 2024, Collin, played as a long snapper for the Virginia Tech Hokies from 2007 to 2011.
