= Gerald Carter =

American football player (born 1957)

No. 87
- Position: Wide receiver

Personal information
- Born: June 19, 1957 (age 69); Bryan, Texas, U.S.
- Listed height: 6 ft 1 in (1.85 m)
- Listed weight: 190 lb (86 kg)

Career information
- High school: Bryan
- College: Texas A&M
- NFL draft: 1980: 9th round, 240th overall pick

Career history
- New York Jets (1980); Tampa Bay Buccaneers (1980–1987)

Career NFL statistics
- Receptions: 239
- Receiving yards: 3,443
- Touchdowns: 17
- Stats at Pro Football Reference

Gerald Louis Carter (born June 19, 1957) is an American former professional football player who was a wide receiver in the National Football League (NFL), primarily for the Tampa Bay Buccaneers. He played college football for the Texas A&M Aggies before being selected by Tampa Bay in the ninth round of the 1980 NFL draft. Carter played in eight NFL seasons from 1980 to 1987. His peak performance in his career came during the 1984 season with the Buccaneers, when he had 60 receoptions for 816 yards and five touchdowns.

== College career ==
Recruited out of Bryan High School in Texas, Carter was a two-year starter at Texas A&M University. In 1978, his first year as a starter, Carter caught 22 passes for 372 yards and a single touchdown. That year, The Aggies went to the Hall Of Fame classic, where they defeated Iowa state 28–12. The following season, under new coach Tom Wilson, the Aggies slipped to 6-5 and did not qualify to appear in a bowl game. That season, Carter caught 39 passes for 528 yards, and two touchdowns.

== Professional career ==
Carter was selected by the Tampa Bay Buccaneers in the 9th round of the 1980 NFL draft, the 240th player taken overall. Carter did not make the team and was cut in August 1980. He was not unemployed long as he was signed by the New York Jets. However, Carter was mainly a backup and special teams player, appearing in just three games and not catching a single pass.

The Jets let him go and Tampa Bay brought him back. For the 1981 and 1982 seasons, Carter was mainly used as a third receiver, and did not start a single game. In 1983, Carter finally became a starter, starting in 9 games for John McKay's 2–14 squad. With star quarterback Doug Williams off to the USFL, Tampa employed Jack Thompson, Jerry Golsteyn and Jeff Komlo and none were up to the task. In 1984, with the arrival of Steve DeBerg, Carter had his finest season as a pro. He started nine games, caught 60 passes for 816 yards and five touchdowns. Though his numbers dipped carter was a full-time starter in 1985. One of the games Carter played in during the 1985 season was the infamous snow bowl against the Green Bay Packers. Played in the snow and ice, Carter admitted years later that the weather made it hard to focus and that h and his teammates, including quarterback Steve Young, couldn't wait to get to the sidelines and warm themselves by the heaters.

Carter was a starter for Tampa Bay over the course of the next two seasons. Carter's final season in Tampa, he played for Ray Perkins, the third coach Carter played for during his career in Tampa Bay. In what would be the final season of his NFL career, Carter caught 38 passes for 586 yards and five touchdown receptions. In first game of the 1987 season, Carter caught a touchdown from DeBerg as the Buccaneers defeated the Atlanta Falcons 48–10 in Perkins' debut as Tampa head coach. During training camp in 1988, Carter injured his hamstring, and struggled to recover, and was cut that summer before the season started.

== NFL career statistics ==
Legend
**Bold**	Career high

Year	Team	Games		Receiving				
Year	Team	GP	GS	Rec	Yds	Avg	Lng	TD
1980	NYJ	3	0	0	0	0.0	0	0
1981	TAM	**16**	0	1	10	10.0	10	0
1982	TAM	9	0	10	140	14.0	27	0
1983	TAM	**16**	9	48	694	14.5	56	2
1984	TAM	**16**	9	**60**	**816**	13.6	**74**	**5**
1985	TAM	**16**	**16**	40	557	13.9	40	3
1986	TAM	15	15	42	640	15.2	46	2
1987	TAM	12	12	38	586	**15.4**	57	**5**
		103	61	239	3,443	14.4	74	17

== Post NFL career ==
After his career in the NFL was over, Carter returned home to Bryan, Texas, and took a job with the Boys & Girls Club, a position he still holds. Carter turned down offers to work elsewhere, and began coaching many teams at the club, including the girls basketball team, which would go on to produce local high school stand outs Tianna Mathis and Keaundra Kelly. In 2019, Carter was voted as the 68th best player in Tampa Bay history, one spot ahead of Vinny Testaverde
