= Kevin House =

American football player (born 1957)

- House, c. 1982

No. 89, 83
- Position: Wide receiver

Personal information
- Born: December 20, 1957 (age 68); St. Louis, Missouri, U.S.
- Listed height: 6 ft 1 in (1.85 m)
- Listed weight: 181 lb (82 kg)

Career information
- High school: University City (University City, Missouri)
- College: Southern Illinois
- NFL draft: 1980: 2nd round, 49th overall pick

Career history
- Tampa Bay Buccaneers (1980–1986); Los Angeles Rams (1986–1987); San Diego Chargers (1988)*
- * Offseason or practice squad member only

Career NFL statistics
- Receptions: 299
- Receiving yards: 5,169
- Receiving touchdowns: 34
- Stats at Pro Football Reference

Kevin Nathaniel House Sr. (born December 20, 1957) is an American former professional football player who was selected by the Tampa Bay Buccaneers in the second round of the 1980 NFL draft. A 6'1", 175 lbs. wide receiver from Southern Illinois University, House played in eight NFL seasons from 1980 to 1987 for the Buccaneers and Los Angeles Rams. His son Kevin Jr., was a cornerback for the San Diego Chargers.

== NFL career statistics ==
Legend
**Bold**	Career high

=== Regular season ===
Year	Team	Games		Receiving				
Year	Team	GP	GS	Rec	Yds	Avg	Lng	TD
1980	TAM	14	1	24	531	22.1	61	5
1981	TAM	**16**	**16**	56	**1,176**	21.0	**84**	**9**
1982	TAM	9	9	28	438	15.6	62	2
1983	TAM	**16**	**16**	47	769	16.4	74	5
1984	TAM	**16**	**16**	**76**	1,005	13.2	55	5
1985	TAM	**16**	**16**	44	803	18.3	59	5
1986	TAM	7	7	11	206	18.7	40	0
1986	RAM	8	3	7	178	**25.4**	60	2
1987	RAM	12	1	6	63	10.5	15	1
		114	85	299	5,169	17.3	84	34

=== Playoffs ===
Year	Team	Games		Receiving				
Year	Team	GP	GS	Rec	Yds	Avg	Lng	TD
1981	TAM	**1**	**1**	1	10	10.0	10	0
1982	TAM	**1**	**1**	**4**	52	13.0	20	0
1986	RAM	**1**	**1**	3	**70**	**23.3**	**45**	**1**
		3	3	8	132	16.5	45	1

== Life after football ==
After his retirement from professional football, House opened and operated a hair salon. After selling the salon, he worked as a recruiter for T-Mobile and then worked for Bank of America. He is now retired.
