= James Wilder Sr. =

American football player (born 1958)

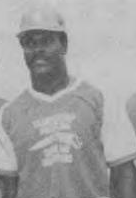
- Wilder Sr. c. 1982

No. 32, 34
- Position: Running back

Personal information
- Born: May 12, 1958 (age 68); Sikeston, Missouri, U.S.
- Listed height: 6 ft 3 in (1.91 m)
- Listed weight: 225 lb (102 kg)

Career information
- High school: Sikeston
- College: Northeastern Oklahoma A&M (1977–1978); Missouri (1978–1980)
- NFL draft: 1981: 2nd round, 34th overall pick

Career history
- Tampa Bay Buccaneers (1981–1989); Washington Redskins (1990); Detroit Lions (1990)

Awards and highlights
- Second-team All-Pro (1984); Pro Bowl (1984); 2× Second-team All-Big Eight (1979, 1980); NFL record: Most combined touches in a season: 492 (1984)

Career NFL statistics
- Rushing yards: 6,008
- Rushing average: 3.8
- Rushing touchdowns: 37
- Receptions: 431
- Receiving yards: 3,500
- Receiving touchdowns: 10
- Stats at Pro Football Reference

James Curtis Wilder Sr. (born May 12, 1958) is an American former professional football player who was a running back in the National Football League (NFL) for the Tampa Bay Buccaneers, Washington Redskins, and the Detroit Lions. He played college football for the Missouri Tigers.

== Early life ==
Wilder played high school football at Sikeston High School where he set school records in career rushing yards and single season rushing yards. He led the Bulldogs to an undefeated season in 1976, his senior year with the team.

== College career ==
Wilder played at Northeastern Oklahoma A&M College in Miami, Oklahoma, then attended and played college football at the University of Missouri where he led the Tigers to three bowl games and became known as the "Sikeston Train" and one of the most popular players for the program.

== Professional career ==
Wilder was drafted by the Tampa Bay Buccaneers in the second round of the 1981 NFL draft. After he shared the backfield as a rookie with Jerry Eckwood in 1981, the Buccaneers released Eckwood in favor of Wilder prior to the 1982 season. He played for most of his career with Tampa Bay, and was a Pro Bowl selection in 1984. Wilder almost set an NFL record that season for combined rushing and receiving yards in a season finishing 16 yards short with 2,229. In an attempt to give Wilder one more chance to break the record in the final minute of the final game of the 1984 season against the New York Jets, head coach John McKay (in what would be his final game as the Buccaneers head coach) ordered his defense to let the Jets score, so that the Bucs could go back on offense. This resulted in one of the strangest plays in NFL history where the Tampa Bay defense simply stood still as the Jets ran the ball into the end zone; McKay was given a large fine from the league for that stunt.

He ranks first in Buccaneer history in rushing yards, rushing attempts and receptions (later broken by Mike Evans) and even set an NFL record with 43 carries in a single game in 1984 (since broken). Also in 1984, he set NFL records for carries (407) (later broken by Jamal Anderson then Larry Johnson) and touches (492) in a single season.

Lawrence Taylor has stated that Wilder was one of the toughest running backs that he played against during his career.

== NFL career statistics ==
Legend
| | NFL record |
| **Bold** | Career high |

| Year | Team | Games | | Rushing | | | | | | Receiving | | | | | Fumbles | |
| Year | Team | GP | GS | Att | Yds | Avg | Y/G | Lng | TD | Rec | Yds | Avg | Lng | TD | Fum | FR |
|---|---|---|---|---|---|---|---|---|---|---|---|---|---|---|---|---|
| 1981 | TB | **16** | **16** | 107 | 370 | 3.5 | 23.1 | 23 | 4 | 48 | 507 | **10.6** | 38 | 1 | 3 | 1 |
| 1982 | TB | 9 | 9 | 83 | 324 | 3.9 | 36.0 | 47 | 3 | 53 | 466 | 8.8 | 32 | 1 | 5 | 1 |
| 1983 | TB | 10 | 10 | 161 | 640 | 4.0 | 64.0 | **75** | 4 | 57 | 380 | 6.7 | 31 | 2 | 1 | 0 |
| 1984 | TB | **16** | **16** | **407** | **1,544** | 3.8 | **96.5** | 37 | **13** | **85** | **685** | 8.1 | **50** | 0 | **10** | **4** |
| 1985 | TB | **16** | **16** | 365 | 1,300 | 3.6 | 81.3 | 28 | 10 | 53 | 341 | 6.4 | 20 | 0 | 9 | 1 |
| 1986 | TB | 12 | 12 | 190 | 704 | 3.7 | 58.7 | 45 | 2 | 43 | 326 | 7.6 | 25 | 1 | **10** | 3 |
| 1987 | TB | 12 | 12 | 106 | 488 | **4.6** | 40.7 | 21 | 0 | 40 | 328 | 8.2 | 32 | 1 | 3 | 2 |
| 1988 | TB | 7 | 7 | 86 | 343 | 4.0 | 49.0 | 19 | 1 | 15 | 124 | 8.3 | 24 | 0 | 1 | 0 |
| 1989 | TB | 15 | 4 | 70 | 244 | 3.5 | 16.3 | 14 | 0 | 36 | 335 | 9.3 | 27 | **3** | 2 | 1 |
| 1990 | DET | 15 | 0 | 11 | 51 | **4.6** | 3.2 | 13 | 0 | 1 | 8 | 8.0 | 8 | 1 | 2 | 1 |
| 1990 | WAS | 1 | 0 | Did not record any stats | | | | | | | | | | | | |
| Career | | 129 | 102 | 1,586 | 6,008 | 3.8 | 46.6 | 75 | 37 | 431 | 3,500 | 8.1 | 50 | 10 | 44 | 13 |

== Personal life ==
Wilder's son, James Wilder Jr., is a former professional football player who played with the Edmonton Elks of the CFL. He played football for Florida State and was a part of their 2013 National Championship winning team, and the 2017 Grey Cup winning team. Coincidentally, Marc Trestman, who was a Buccaneers assistant coach during the senior Wilder's career, was the junior Wilder's head coach. Wilder's daughter, Courtney Wilder, played running back on the Tampa Breeze during the 2011–12 LFL season.
