= Obed Ariri =

Nigerian gridiron football player (born 1956)

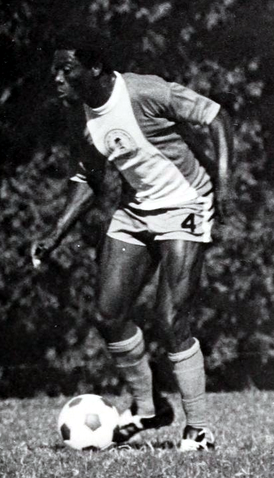
- Ariri playing soccer for Clemson in 1976

No. 2, 5
- Position: Kicker

Personal information
- Born: April 4, 1956 (age 70); Owerri, Nigeria

Career information
- College: Clemson
- NFL draft: 1981: 7th round, 178th overall pick

Career history
- 1981: Baltimore Colts*
- 1983: Washington Federals (USFL)
- 1984: Tampa Bay Buccaneers
- 1987: Washington Redskins
- 1994: Miami Hooters (AFL)
- * Offseason or practice squad member only
- Stats at Pro Football Reference

Other information
Association football career
- Height: 5 ft 9 in (1.75 m)
- Position: Forward
College career
Years	Team	Apps	(Gls)
1976–1979	Clemson		
Senior career*
Years	Team	Apps	(Gls)
- P & T Vasco da Gama
1980	Chicago Sting	4	(0)
- * Club domestic league appearances and goals

Obed Chukwuma Ariri (//; born April 4, 1956) is a Nigerian-born former American football placekicker who played two seasons in the National Football League (NFL). He is distinguished as being the first Nigerian to play in the NFL. He also played in the United States Football League (USFL) for the Washington Federals and in the Arena Football League (AFL) for the Miami Hooters.

== Early life ==
Ariri was born in Nigeria, and his middle name Chukwuma means "God Only Knows". He became a skilled soccer player and was scouted by Clemson University's soccer coach Ibrahim M. Ibrahim. After watching him play in Nigeria, Ibrahim offered Ariri a soccer scholarship to Clemson on the spot.

== Early career ==
Ariri was enrolled at Clemson in 1977 when Clemson football coach Charlie Pell was in dire need of a kicker. Ibrahim allowed Ariri to try out only if he agreed to continue to play soccer. Pell agreed, and Ariri went on to nail every attempt, thus securing his place as the kicker for the Tigers. His scholarship was shifted to football and Pell insisted that Obed forget about soccer. Ariri had never kicked a football until he was at Clemson.

He was so popular in campus during his senior year that "Obed Ariri for the Heisman Trophy" bumper stickers were made up.

In 1979, Ariri was granted permission to play in the 1979 NCAA Division I National Soccer Championships at Tampa Stadium in Tampa, Florida. The Tigers lost 3–2 to Southern Illinois University Edwardsville. Ariri's performance during the game led to a job offer with the Chicago Sting of the North American Soccer League, where he made four appearances during the 1980 season.

== Professional career ==
Ariri was drafted in the seventh round of the 1981 NFL draft by the Baltimore Colts but was cut from the team days before the season. He was on the initial roster of the USFL's Washington Federals but did not last the entire season due to inconsistency and poor performance. The Tampa Bay Buccaneers acquired Obed in the 1984 pre-season but was waived before final cuts. After kicker Bill Capece flopped in the final Buccaneer pre-season game, Ariri was hired in time for the start of the regular season and he was their regular kicker that season, only to be released during the 1985 training camp. He was nicknamed the "Automatic African" by his teammates.

- 1983 - Washington Federals (USFL)
- 1984 - Tampa Bay Buccaneers
- 1987 - Washington Redskins (strike replacement player)
- 1994 - Miami Hooters (Arena Football League)

== Honors ==
- Set 6 NCAA kicking records and tied another 3
- First Buccaneer to kick three 40 yard-plus field goals in a game
- 1977 Made the longest field goal in Clemson history against Wake Forest (57 yards)
- 1978 Made the longest field goal in Gator Bowl history (47 yards)
- 1980 NCAA 1st Team All-American
- 1998 Inducted into the Clemson Hall of Fame

== Legacy ==
Young Nigerian soccer player Donald Igwebuike had idolized Ariri back in Nigeria. Ariri encouraged Igwebuike to attend Clemson and inspired him to kick a football. The young player attended Clemson and was looked after by Ariri. After graduating Ariri even encouraged Coach Danny Ford to give Igwebuike a chance to kick for the football team. Igwebuike not only made the team, he went on to the NFL and beat out Ariri for the kicking spot at Tampa Bay.

After his playing career concluded, Ariri has stayed in the Tampa Bay area, driving a taxi in St. Petersburg, Florida. In 2018, Ariri was awarded a Super Bowl ring for playing for the Redskins in 1987, the year they won Super Bowl XXII.
