= Ken Herock =

American football player

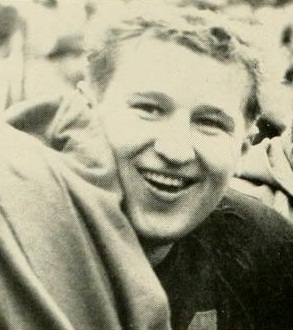
- Herock from The Monticola, 1963

No. 86, 84, 34, 36
- Position: Tight end

Personal information
- Born: July 16, 1941 (age 85); Munhall, Pennsylvania, U.S.
- Listed height: 6 ft 2 in (1.88 m)
- Listed weight: 230 lb (104 kg)

Career information
- High school: Munhall
- College: West Virginia
- NFL draft: 1963: undrafted

Career history
- Oakland Raiders (1963–1967); Cincinnati Bengals (1968); Boston Patriots (1969)

Awards and highlights
- AFL champion (1967)
- Stats at Pro Football Reference

Ken Herock (born July 16, 1941) is an American former professional football player who was a tight end in the American Football League (AFL). He played college football for the West Virginia Mountaineers. He played in AFL for the league champion Oakland Raiders in the second AFL-NFL World Championship Game, held after the 1967 season. He attended Munhall High School in Pittsburgh. His six-year pro career was also spent with the Cincinnati Bengals, and the Boston Patriots.

After his playing career ended, Herock became a player personnel executive in the NFL with the Raiders, the Tampa Bay Buccaneers, and the Atlanta Falcons. He is known for trading Brett Favre from the Falcons to the Green Bay Packers at the urging of head coach Jerry Glanville.

== Career ==
Herock spent seven seasons as the Raiders' personnel director, and was credited with helping build their Super Bowl XI championship team. He followed Ron Wolf to the expansion Buccaneers, where he held the title of Director of Player Personnel for the team's first eight years. During his tenure, the Buccaneers reached the playoffs in only four years, at that time the fastest of any NFL team. At the expiration of his contract in 1984, Herock found that he could make more money than he was being offered by Buccaneers owner Hugh Culverhouse, but the frugal Culverhouse refused to increase his offer. Coach Howard Schnellenberger then made Herock his first hire, offering him the same position with the USFL Washington Federals. This failed to pan out, as the team's planned move to Miami coincided with the USFL's planned move to a fall schedule, and their prospective owner canceled his purchase of the team rather than try to compete head-to-head with the Miami Dolphins and Hurricanes.

== Honors ==
Herock is a member of the West Virginia Hall of Fame.
