= James Owens (American football, born 1955) =

American football player and hurdler (born 1955)

No. 20, 89, 26
- Positions: Running back, wide receiver, defensive back

Personal information
- Born: July 5, 1955 (age 71); Sacramento, California, U.S.
- Listed height: 5 ft 11 in (1.80 m)
- Listed weight: 192 lb (87 kg)

Career information
- High school: Norte Del Rio (Sacramento)
- College: UCLA
- NFL draft: 1979: 2nd round, 29th overall pick

Career history
- San Francisco 49ers (1979–1980); Tampa Bay Buccaneers (1981–1984)

Career NFL statistics
- Rushing yards: 944
- Rushing average: 3.5
- Rushing touchdowns: 8
- Stats at Pro Football Reference

James Earl Owens (born July 5, 1955) is an American former professional football player who played six seasons in the National Football League (NFL) for the San Francisco 49ers and Tampa Bay Buccaneers.

Owens was an All-American hurdler for the UCLA Bruins track and field team, winning the 110 m hurdles at the 1977 NCAA Division I Outdoor Track and Field Championships. He competed at the 1976 Summer Olympics in Montreal in the 110 meter hurdles, finishing sixth.
