= Bill Capece =

American football player (born 1959)

No. 3
- Position: Placekicker

Personal information
- Born: April 1, 1959 (age 67); Miami, Florida, U.S.
- Listed height: 5 ft 7 in (1.70 m)
- Listed weight: 170 lb (77 kg)

Career information
- High school: Chaminade (Hollywood, Florida)
- College: Florida State
- NFL draft: 1981: 12th round, 324th overall pick

Career history
- Houston Oilers (1981)*; Tampa Bay Buccaneers (1981–1983)
- * Offseason or practice squad member only

Awards and highlights
- Second-team All-American (1980)

Career NFL statistics
- Field goal attempts/made: 70 / 43
- Field goal %: 61.4
- Extra point attempts/made: 72 / 67
- Stats at Pro Football Reference

William George Capece (born April 1, 1959) is an American former professional football player who was a placekicker for three seasons with the Tampa Bay Buccaneers of the National Football League (NFL). He played college football for the Florida State Seminoles.

Capece attended Chaminade High School in Hollywood, Florida along with David Shula, and was invited by Shula's father, Miami Dolphins coach Don Shula, to attend Dolphin practices and work out with placekicker Garo Yepremian. It was Yepremian who provided Capece with the encouragement to consider a career in professional football. Capece attended Florida State University, where he graduated as the holder of FSU's records for single-season scoring (104 points), most field goals in a game (five, against Pittsburgh), and field goal percentage (100%). His 104 points in 1980 were the most by a kicker in national collegiate history. He was signed to a professional contract with the Buccaneers in 1981, during a week in which the Buccaneers cut both their placekicker and their punter. Ironically, Capece's signing marked the end of his former mentor's career, as Yepremian was the player he was signed to replace. Capece missed a field goal and an extra point in a 1983 loss to the Green Bay Packers in the 1983 home finale, and was told to stay home for the season’s final game in Detroit. After that game, a 23-20 loss, coach John McKay made his famous announcement that "Capece is kaput". Capece returned as the team's placekicker the following season, but was waived following a poor performance in a preseason game against the Dolphins. His 41 field goals stood as the Buccaneers' career record until broken in 1987 by Donald Igwebuike.
