= John Holt (American football) =

American football player (1959–2013)

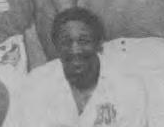
- Holt, c. 1982

No. 21
- Position: Cornerback

Personal information
- Born: May 14, 1959; Lawton, Oklahoma, U.S.
- Died: February 13, 2013 (aged 53); Tampa, Florida, U.S.
- Listed height: 5 ft 11 in (1.80 m)
- Listed weight: 180 lb (82 kg)

Career information
- High school: Enid (Enid, Oklahoma)
- College: West Texas A&M
- NFL draft: 1981: 4th round, 89th overall pick

Career history
- Tampa Bay Buccaneers (1981–1985); Indianapolis Colts (1986–1988)

Career NFL statistics
- Interceptions: 7
- Fumble recoveries: 9
- Sacks: 1.5
- Stats at Pro Football Reference

John Stephanie Holt (May 14, 1959 – February 13, 2013) was an American professional football cornerback in the National Football League (NFL) for the Tampa Bay Buccaneers and Indianapolis Colts. He played college football at West Texas State University.
