= Steve DeBerg =

American football player (born 1954)

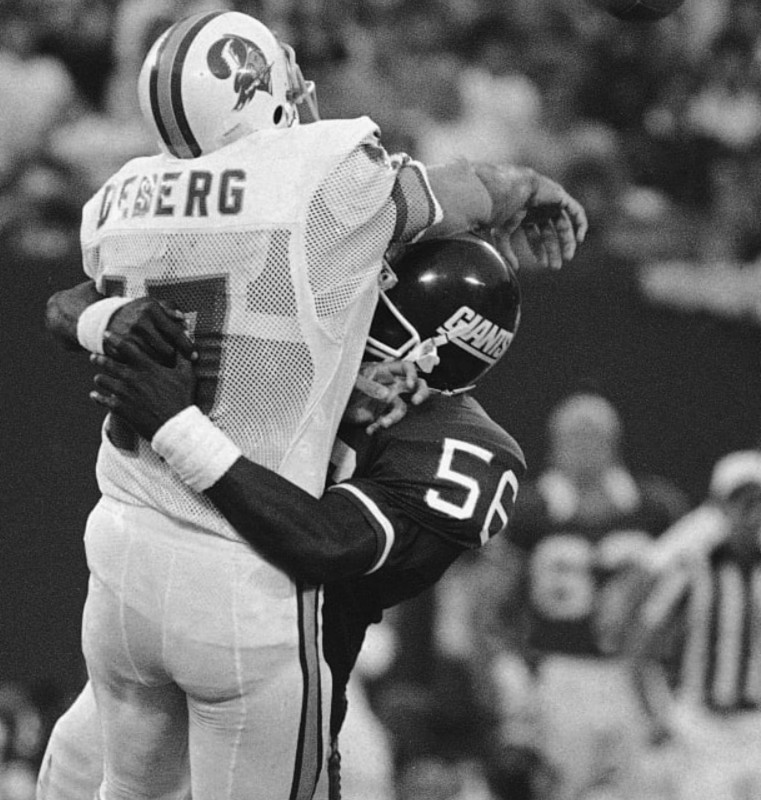
- DeBerg (left) and Lawrence Taylor in 1984

No. 17
- Position: Quarterback

Personal information
- Born: January 19, 1954 (age 72); Oakland, California, U.S.
- Listed height: 6 ft 3 in (1.91 m)
- Listed weight: 210 lb (95 kg)

Career information
- High school: Savanna (Anaheim, California)
- College: Fullerton (1972–1973); San Jose State (1974–1976)
- NFL draft: 1977: 10th round, 275th overall pick

Career history

Playing
- Dallas Cowboys (1977)*; San Francisco 49ers (1977–1980); Denver Broncos (1981–1983); Tampa Bay Buccaneers (1984–1987); Kansas City Chiefs (1988–1991); Tampa Bay Buccaneers (1992–1993); Miami Dolphins (1993); Atlanta Falcons (1998)
- * Offseason or practice squad member only

Coaching
- New York Giants (1995–1996) Quarterbacks coach; Indiana Firebirds (2004) Head coach; Tampa Bay Storm (2004) Quarterbacks coach

Awards and highlights
- Led the NFL in completions (1979); PCAA Offensive Player of the Year (1976); All-PCAA (1976)

Career NFL statistics
- Passing attempts: 5,024
- Passing completions: 2,874
- Completion percentage: 57.2%
- TD–INT: 196–204
- Passing yards: 34,241
- Passer rating: 74.2
- Stats at Pro Football Reference

Steven Leroy DeBerg (born January 19, 1954) is an American former professional football player who was a quarterback in the National Football League (NFL) for 18 years.

== Early life ==
DeBerg is an alumnus of Savanna High School in Anaheim, California. He was the starting quarterback, and excelled in the pole vault.

== College career ==
DeBerg was the starting quarterback at Fullerton College during the 1972 and 1973 seasons. As a sophomore in 1973, DeBerg led his team to a South Coast Conference title with a 5–0 record. In the postseason, Fullerton defeated San Diego City College 24–0 but lost 29–20 to Los Angeles City College in the state semifinals. DeBerg ended the season with an overall record of 10–1–0, and received Junior College All-American honors.

He transferred to San José State University in 1974, and became the Spartans' starting quarterback in 1976. DeBerg led his team to a Pacific Coast Athletic Association (Big West Conference) title, and was named the PCAA offensive player of the year. He set nine school records, completing 141 of 262 attempts for 2,084 yards, 19 touchdowns, and six interceptions.

In 1993, DeBerg was inducted into the California Community College's Football Coaches Association Hall of Fame. Eight years later, he was inducted into the San Jose State University Ring of Honor and Sports Hall of Fame.

== Professional career ==
Although large portions of his professional career were spent as a backup, DeBerg accumulated significant NFL statistics (particularly during the early 1990s, when he was the starting quarterback for the Kansas City Chiefs). DeBerg played for the San Francisco 49ers (1978–1980), Denver Broncos (1981–1983), Tampa Bay Buccaneers (1984–1987, 1992, 1993), Kansas City Chiefs (1988–1991), Miami Dolphins (1993), and Atlanta Falcons (1998). He was selected by the Dallas Cowboys in the tenth round (275th overall) of the 1977 NFL draft, but was waived before the start of the season when he could not displace fellow rookie quarterback Glenn Carano.

DeBerg has been called one of the best play-action pass quarterbacks of all time. Peyton Manning has studied films of DeBerg's play-action technique. He played through injuries; ill with laryngitis, he wore a portable amplifier during regular-season games with San Francisco.

=== 1977–1980: San Francisco 49ers ===
On September 14, 1977, DeBerg was signed to the San Francisco 49ers' practice squad.

DeBerg was tapped to be the starting quarterback for the 1978 season. He started eleven of the sixteen games for the team, which saw him go 1–10 as a starter. He threw for 1,570 total yards in twelve games for eight touchdowns to 22 interceptions. The following year would be the first for the 49ers with head coach Bill Walsh, who would soon institute a West Coast Offense while also drafting Joe Montana in the third round of the 1979 NFL draft. DeBerg threw all but 24 passes thrown by a quarterback for the 49ers that season, which included 15 starts and one appearance replacing Montana as a starter. He posted his first 100.0 passer rating as a starter (one of two 49ers' wins all year) against the Tampa Bay Buccaneers. DeBerg finished the game with 22 completions in 30 pass attempts (a season-high 73.3-percent completion rate), with one touchdown and no interceptions. DeBerg threw for 3,652 yards with 17 touchdowns and 21 interceptions as the team went 2–14. DeBerg led the NFL in completions (347) and pass attempts (578). He ranked fifth in the league in passing yards.

DeBerg would start nine of the first twelve games of the 1980 season but was eventually supplanted by Montana as the permanent starter; notably, DeBerg started the first three games of the season with an unusual device born out of necessity: with damaged vocal cords from a hit to the neck during the preseason that left him unable to speak above a whisper, DeBerg would have a speaker, amplifier, and power pack attached to the back of his shoulder pads (with a switch in his helmet and a mini microphone on the bar of his facemask) to call signals and audibles. He threw for 1,998 yards with 12 touchdowns and 17 interceptions with a 66.7 passer rating. The Niners won six games, with four being starts by DeBerg; the low point was a five-interception game in a lopsided loss to Dallas on October 12. By this point, DeBerg knew the writing was on the wall for his playing time in San Francisco, once noting that in regards to the organization, “They brought Joe along perfectly...When he played, he was almost perfectly prepared. It was obvious from the time that Joe was drafted that he was being groomed to be the guy. At times it was frustrating...but I knew Joe was going to be a really good quarterback. It wasn't any secret." The 49ers traded him to Denver for a fourth-round draft pick.

=== 1981–1983: Denver Broncos ===
DeBerg was traded to the Denver Broncos on August 31, 1981 for a 1983 fourth-round draft pick (#87, Chuck Nelson), rejoining Dan Reeves (who coached him during his short time with the Cowboys). DeBerg was the second-string quarterback behind Craig Morton, making spot appearances while having one start against Cincinnati in the twelfth week of the season.

DeBerg would make relief appearances for Morton in the first three games of the strike-shortened nine-game 1982 season before being tapped to start the next five games, which he won just one of those games before Mark Herrmann started the final game of the season. In total, DeBerg threw for 1,405 yards with seven touchdowns and 11 interceptions with a 67.2 passer rating as Denver went 2–7. In the 1983 NFL draft, Denver acquired John Elway, who had refused to sign with the Baltimore Colts as the number one draft pick. Elway would start the first five games of the season while DeBerg appeared to relieve him in four of those games before DeBerg was tapped to start the Week 6 matchup against Houston. He would win that game and the next three starts, which included throwing for 350 yards with one touchdown in a 27–24 win over Kansas City. Against Seattle, he threw just 10-of-20 before suffering a shoulder injury that knocked him out of the game and as it turned out the remainder of the regular season. In his absence, the Broncos managed to finish 9–7 and qualify for a postseason spot. DeBerg was tapped to start the game against Seattle. He went 14-of-19 for 131 yards with a touchdown and interception while being sacked twice as he was relieved for Elway prior to the game ending, which was a 31–7 loss. In the regular season, DeBerg had thrown for 1,617 yards with nine touchdowns to seven interceptions with a 79.9 passer rating. After the season, DeBerg was traded to the Tampa Bay Buccaneers and eventually signed a four-year contract worth $2.5 million.

=== 1984–1987: Tampa Bay Buccaneers (first stint) ===
On April 24, 1984, DeBerg was traded to the Tampa Bay Buccaneers for a fourth-round pick (#89, Randy Robbins) and a 1985 conditional pick who ended up being a second-round selection (#36, Richard Byrd). He arrived at the club when Steve Young and Vinny Testaverde (1987) were drafted.

DeBerg was the central starter for the 1984 Buccaneers, who posted one of the league's more productive offensive attacks when he was the starting quarterback. The 1984 Bucs ranked 10th in the league in total offensive yards, and eighth in passing yards. DeBerg appeared in all 16 games, starting 13 and winning five of the team's six victories that year. He passed for 3,554 yards (the second-best of his career), with 308 completions in 509 attempts (both the second-best of his career) and 19 touchdowns against 18 interceptions.

He finished high on the NFL leaderboards for the 1984 season in attempts (fourth), completions (fourth), passing yards (seventh), touchdown passes (ninth) and passing yards per game (eighth). The Bucs earned their first win of the season with DeBerg coming off the bench, a 21–17 victory against Detroit on September 16 in which he completed 18 of 27 passes (66.7 percent) for 195 yards with two touchdowns and no interceptions. It was one of four games that season in which DeBerg's quarterback rating topped 100; the other three were October 7 against Minnesota, October 14 against Detroit, and December 16 against the New York Jets.

DeBerg never passed for fewer than 191 yards in any start that year, and topped the 200-yard mark ten times. His season-high 322 passing yards came on November 25, 1984, in a 34–33 shootout loss to the Los Angeles Rams.

Narrow losses became the norm, as six of the team's eight losses with DeBerg were by seven points or less. Tampa's won-lost record regressed the following year, but DeBerg started 11 games and played in all 16. He ranked 10th in the league in touchdown passes, completing 197 of 370 passes for 2,488 yards with 19 touchdowns and 18 interceptions.

After starting only two games in 1986, DeBerg was again Tampa's leading passer in his final season there in 1987. Appearing in 12 games (with eight starts), he completed 159 of 275 passes for 1,891 yards with 14 touchdowns and seven interceptions—his lowest mark up to this point in a season in which he started at least six games. DeBerg finished eighth in the league in QB rating (85.8), his first season in the year-end top 10 for that category.

He also finished in the league's top 10 in completion rate (57.8 percent), one of six seasons in the year-end top 10 in that category (1979, 1982, 1984, 1987, 1989, 1990). DeBerg made a career-high five touchdown passes in an opening-day win against Atlanta on September 13, 1987, a game in which he completed 24 of 34 pass attempts (a season-high 70.4-percent completion rate) for 333 yards.

=== 1988–1991: Kansas City Chiefs ===
On March 31, 1988, the Buccaneers traded him to the Kansas City Chiefs for safety Mark Robinson and fourth- (#86, John Bruhin) and eighth-round picks (#198, Anthony Simpson). Although he is remembered as a journeyman quarterback, DeBerg passed for over 34,000 career yards and ranks in the all-time top 45 in attempts, completions, and yards passed. His best years were with the Chiefs, when he led the team to two playoff berths. DeBerg's best year was 1990, when he had a 96.3 quarterback rating and passed for 3,444 yards, 23 touchdowns, and four interceptions (three of which were in one game).

DeBerg appeared in 13 games with 11 starts and passed for 2,935 yards with 16 touchdowns and 16 interceptions in his first season with the Chiefs, completing 224 of 414 passes. He defeated his old team (Denver) on September 18, 1988, in one of his better games of the year, throwing 259 yards and two touchdowns with no interceptions. DeBerg's best game was against the New York Jets on December 4, 1988, when he completed 16 of 25 passes for 267 yards and three touchdowns against one interception for a 38–34 win.

Turnover issues again temporarily cost him his starting job in 1989. DeBerg threw eight interceptions in the team's first three games, including five in one game (against the San Diego Chargers) on September 24. After sitting for two weeks, he briefly returned to the playing field; he then sat for two more weeks before finishing the season by starting the team's final six games. Among DeBerg's highlights was a 338-yard, one-touchdown, two-interception performance against the Pittsburgh Steelers in a 23–17 loss on October 29. He finished the 1989 season with 2,529 yards passing, completing 196 of 324 passes (a 60.5-percent completion rate), with 11 touchdowns against 16 interceptions.

The 1990 season was DeBerg's best. His 3,444 yards were his third-best single-season career total, and seventh in the league. DeBerg's 96.3 passer rating was a career high (and third in the league), and he finished in the top 10 for yards per attempt (7.8, fourth in the league and his second straight season in the category's top five). He was eighth in the league in passing yards per game and fifth in the league in yards per completion; his previous best was ninth in 1988. DeBerg's 23 touchdown passes ranked sixth, one of his four top-ten seasons. He led the league with a 0.9 interception percentage which included a career-high (and team-record) 223 passes without an interception, one of his three top-ten seasons; the other two were 1979 and 1987.

DeBerg posted a career-high 395 yards passing against Denver on September 17, 1990. He seriously injured his non-throwing hand in a loss to the Houston Oilers on December 16, which required the insertion of a pin into his broken finger to keep it straight. For their last two games and the playoffs, the Chiefs ran their offense out of the shotgun formation to protect DeBerg from having the football jammed in his injured hand during the center-to-quarterback exchange. Kansas City won those games to clinch their second playoff appearance in over a decade, with DeBerg completing 44 of 59 passes for 527 yards with two touchdowns and no interceptions. In a 17–16 loss to the Miami Dolphins in the 1990 AFC wild-card game, he completed 17 of 30 pass attempts for 269 yards with one touchdown and one interception.

=== 1992–1993: Tampa Bay Buccaneers (second stint) ===
DeBerg rejoined the Buccaneers and played with them in 1992. He made two starts that year, both resulting in losses. In 1993, after three games with Tampa Bay, the Buccaneers cut DeBerg leading him to believe his career was over.

=== 1993: Miami Dolphins ===
Shortly after, however, the Miami Dolphins signed him. He was inactive for the Week 11 matchup for Miami before being tapped to start the next week against New England due to injury to Scott Mitchell, who had become the starter when Dan Marino had ruptured his Achilles tendon in October before Mitchell dislocated his left throwing shoulder that left only Doug Pederson in the QB room. With the team at 8–2, DeBerg started the next four games for Miami, which included a win on Thanksgiving Day where the Dolphins pulled off a 16–14 win when they recovered a fumble after their field goal attempt was blocked. However, it was the only win in his four starts (three of the games saw him throw two interceptions each), one of which saw him leave briefly after a hit saw him bleed from a helmet shot to his chin that required seven stitches to go along with a bandage covering his throat before he returned to play after halftime. Mitchell returned to start the final three games of the season, with DeBerg's last appearance being in relief of Mitchell against Buffalo, throwing 20-of-35 for 273 yards with two touchdowns and an interception. In total with two teams for 1993, he threw for 1,707 yards with seven touchdowns and ten interceptions. He retired for the first time after the season ended.

=== 1998: Atlanta Falcons and second retirement ===
DeBerg returned to the NFL in 1998 at age 44, rejoining head coach Dan Reeves as a backup with the Atlanta Falcons. On October 25, with Chris Chandler unable to play, Deberg became the oldest quarterback to start in an NFL game (later surpassed by Tom Brady) when he led the Falcons against the New York Jets. In a 28–3 Falcons loss, DeBerg threw 9 of 20 for 117 yards and an interception before he was taken out for Tony Graziani. DeBerg was the oldest player on a Super Bowl roster (45 years, 12 days) when the Falcons appeared in Super Bowl XXXIII against the Denver Broncos (led by John Elway), although he did not play. Coincidentally, both DeBerg and Elway would retire after the end of the game.

On February 5, 2010, DeBerg was inducted into the Rebel Hall of Fame at Savanna High School for his achievements as a starting quarterback in college and the NFL. The induction was held during halftime at a varsity boys basketball game at Savanna High School.

== Coaching career ==
From 1995 to 1996, DeBerg was the New York Giants' quarterbacks coach under Dan Reeves.

DeBerg was head coach of the Arena Football League's Indiana Firebirds in 2004 for five games; the team's record during his tenure was 0–5. He was later an assistant coach for the Tampa Bay Storm.

== Career statistics ==
=== NFL ===
Legend
	Led the league
**Bold**	Career high

Year	Team	Games			Passing								
Year	Team	GP	GS	Record	Cmp	Att	Pct	Yds	Avg	TD	Int	Lng	Rtg
1978	SF	12	11	1–10	137	302	45.4	1,570	5.2	8	**22**	58	40.0
1979	SF	**16**	15	2–13	**347**	**578**	60.0	**3,652**	6.3	17	21	50	73.1
1980	SF	11	9	4–5	186	321	57.9	1,998	6.2	12	17	**93**	66.7
1981	DEN	14	1	0–1	64	108	59.3	797	7.4	6	6	44	77.6
1982	DEN	9	5	1–4	131	223	58.7	1,405	6.3	7	11	51	67.2
1983	DEN	10	5	4–1	119	215	55.3	1,617	7.5	9	7	54	79.9
1984	TB	**16**	13	5–8	308	509	60.5	3,554	7.0	19	18	55	79.3
1985	TB	11	11	1–10	197	370	53.2	2,488	6.7	19	18	57	71.3
1986	TB	**16**	2	0–2	50	96	52.1	610	6.4	5	12	45	49.7
1987	TB	12	8	2–6	159	275	57.8	1,891	6.9	14	7	64	85.3
1988	KC	13	11	4–6–1	224	414	54.1	2,935	7.1	16	16	80	73.5
1989	KC	12	10	6–4	196	324	60.5	2,529	7.8	11	16	50	75.8
1990	KC	**16**	**16**	**11–5**	258	444	58.1	3,444	7.8	**23**	4	90	**96.3**
1991	KC	**16**	15	10–5	256	434	59.0	2,965	6.8	17	14	63	79.3
1992	TB	6	2	0–2	76	125	**60.8**	710	5.7	3	4	28	71.1
1993	TB	3	1	0–1	23	39	59.0	186	4.8	1	3	24	47.6
1993	MIA	5	4	2–2	113	188	60.1	1,521	8.1	6	7	47	81.0
1998	ATL	8	1	0–1	30	59	50.8	369	6.3	3	1	35	80.4
Career		206	140	53–86–1	2,874	5,024	57.2	34,241	6.8	196	204	93	74.2

=== College ===
Season	Team	GP	Passing						
Season	Team	GP	Cmp	Att	Pct	Yds	TD	Int	Rtg
1975	San Jose State	11	5	10	50.0	75	1	0	146.0
1976	San Jose State	11	141	262	53.8	2,084	19	6	140.0
College career		22	146	272	53.7	2,159	20	6	140.2

== Personal life ==
On August 17, 1974, DeBerg married Marcia North. They had two children, and divorced in 1996.
