= Sytsma =

Sytsma is a surname. Notable people with the surname include:

- John Frederick Sytsma (1921–2007), American trade unionist
- Stan Sytsma (born 1956), American football player
