= San Diego Chargers =

American football team (1961–2017)

Logo	Wordmark
- Uniforms

General information
- Founded: 1961
- Folded: 2016
- Headquartered: San Diego Stadium; San Diego, California
- Colors: Navy blue, powder blue, gold, white
- Fight song: San Diego Super Chargers
- Headquartered in Chargers Park; San Diego, California

Personnel
- Owners: Barron Hilton (1961–1966); Eugene Klein and Sam Schulman (1966–1984); Alex Spanos (1984–2016)
- General manager: Sid Gillman (1961–1970); Harland Svare (1971–1975); Johnny Sanders (1976–1986); Steve Ortmayer (1987–1989); Bobby Beathard (1990–2000); John Butler (2001–2003); A. J. Smith (2003–2013); Tom Telesco (2013–2016)
- Head coach: Sid Gillman (1961–1969, 1971); Charlie Waller (1969–1970); Harland Svare (1971–1973); Ron Waller (1973); Tommy Prothro (1974–1978); Don Coryell (1978–1986); Al Saunders (1986–1988); Dan Henning (1989–1991); Bobby Ross (1992–1996); Kevin Gilbride (1997–1998); June Jones (1998); Mike Riley (1999–2001); Marty Schottenheimer (2002–2006); Norv Turner (2007–2012); Mike McCoy (2013–2016)

Nicknames
- The Bolts; San Diego Super Chargers

Team history
- Los Angeles Chargers (1960, 2017–present); San Diego Chargers (1961–2016)

Home fields
- Balboa Stadium (1961–1966); San Diego Stadium (1967–2016)

League / conference affiliations
- American Football League (1961–1969): Western Division (1961–1969); National Football League (1970–2016): American Football Conference (1970–2016); AFC West (1970–2016)

Championships
- League championships: 1: AFL championships (pre-1970 AFL–NFL merger) (1) 1963
- Conference championships: 1: AFC: 1994
- Division championships: 14: AFL West: 1961, 1963, 1964, 1965; AFC West: 1979, 1980, 1981, 1992, 1994, 2004, 2006, 2007, 2008, 2009

Playoff appearances (17)
- AFL: 1961, 1963, 1964, 1965; NFL: 1979, 1980, 1981, 1982, 1992, 1994, 1995, 2004, 2006, 2007, 2008, 2009, 2013

The San Diego Chargers were a professional American football team in the National Football League (NFL). The Chargers played in San Diego from 1961 until 2016, before relocating back to the Greater Los Angeles area, where the franchise played its inaugural 1960 season. The team is now known as the Los Angeles Chargers.

The Chargers' first home game in San Diego was at Balboa Stadium against the Oakland Raiders on September 17, 1961. The team played a majority of their time in San Diego at San Diego Stadium, from 1967 until 2017. Their final game as a San Diego–based team was played at the end of the 2016 season on January 1, 2017, against the Kansas City Chiefs, who defeated them 37–27.

== Los Angeles (1960) ==
In 1959, the team began as the "Los Angeles Chargers" when they entered the American Football League (AFL), joining seven other teams: the Denver Broncos, Dallas Texans, Oakland Raiders, New York Titans, Houston Oilers, Buffalo Bills, and Boston Patriots. The Chargers' first owner was Barron Hilton, the son of Conrad Hilton, founder of the Hilton Hotels corporation. Lamar Hunt, who was instrumental in organizing the AFL, said that he had asked Gene Mako for a suggestion for somebody to start a team in Los Angeles and he recommended Hilton. Hunt said that he visited Hilton for less than an hour and Hilton immediately agreed to start a team.

Barron Hilton held a contest to find a name for his team. The prize was a trip to Mexico. A man from Hollywood named Gerald Courtney submitted the name "Chargers" and won. Conrad Hilton said, "I liked [the name] because they were yelling 'charge' and sounding the bugle at Dodger Stadium and at USC games". Hunt said he thought Hilton picked the team name from the first batch of letters as publicity for his new charge account business Carte Blanche.

The team's first general manager was Frank Leahy, a former University of Notre Dame football coach. The team's first head coach was Sid Gillman from the Los Angeles Rams. His strength lay in offense innovation and he was later honored in the Hall of Fame. Gillman (87–57–6) signed a contract with the team for three years. When Frank Leahy resigned due to poor health, Gillman became the general manager in addition to his coaching role.

The Chargers originally planned to play at the Rose Bowl, but instead signed a lease to play at the Los Angeles Coliseum.

The Chargers were to host the first ever AFL national championship game at the Los Angeles Coliseum in 1961 (for the 1960 season). However, as attendances for home games were falling below 10,000, league and ABC television officials, fearing that showing empty seats in the 100,000+ seat Coliseum might jeopardize the entire league, persuaded the Chargers to give up the advantage and move the game to Houston (where they lost).

== Move to San Diego ==
In December 1960, reports surfaced that the Chargers were considering relocation offers from San Diego, Atlanta, and Seattle. Greg Gregston of the San Diego Union reported that the Chargers "have learned in one season that Los Angeles has been saturated beyond sensible proportions with sports." In January 1961, the team announced the move to Balboa Stadium in San Diego's Balboa Park. Hilton was reported to have lost $900,000 in the first season. San Diego would spend $250,000 to increase stadium seating from 22,000 to 30,000; adding back rests for reserved seats; raising the scoreboard; upgrading the locker rooms; moving the football field closer to the stands and reseeding it; and improving security measures. The Junior Chamber Commerce reported that there were 10,000 firm commitments for season tickets. Seating was increased even more in May 1961 with upper deck bring the total capacity to 34,000; both Atlanta and Seattle would later get NFL teams of their own, when the Falcons were enfranchised in 1966, and when the Seahawks began play in 1976, respectively.

== Early history (1961–1977) ==
=== 1961–1966 ===
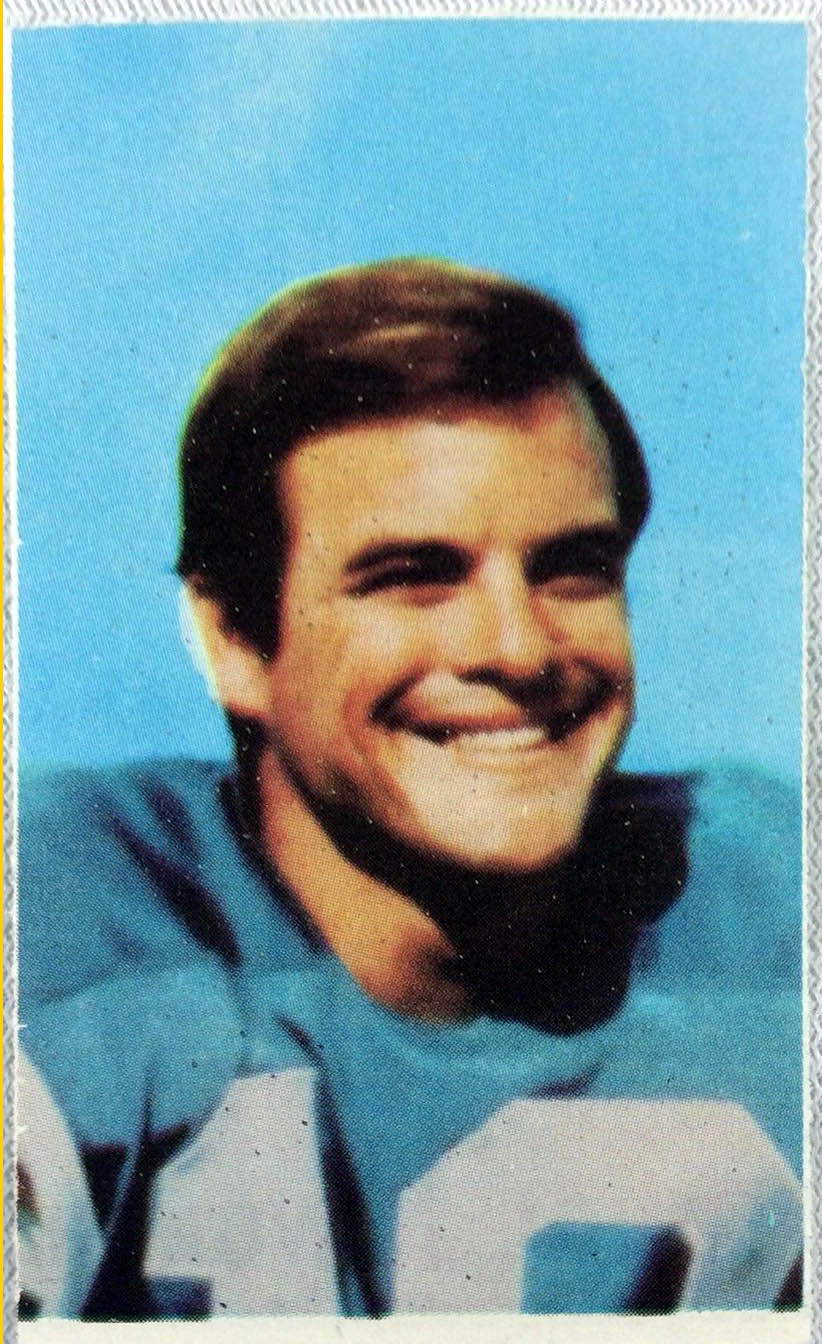
Hall of Fame WR Lance Alworth

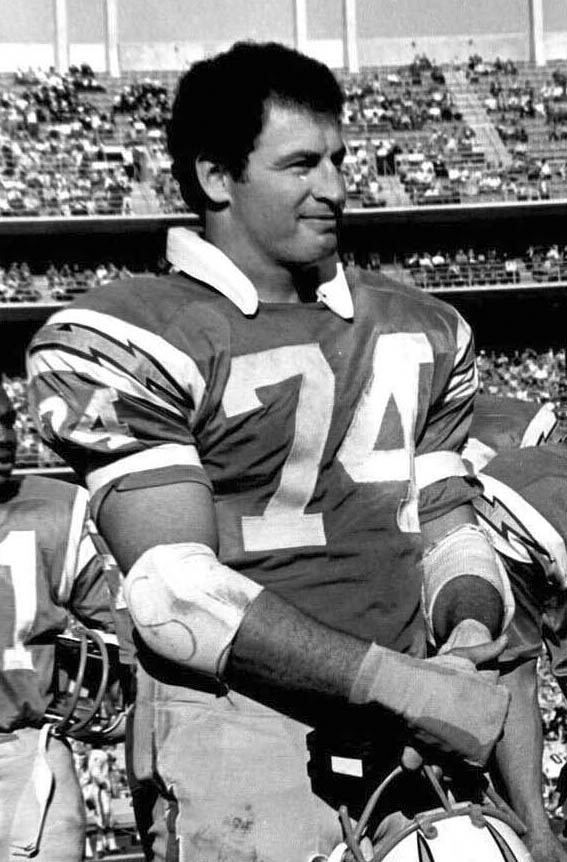
Hall of Fame OT Ron Mix

In the 1960s, the Chargers featured future Hall of Famers Lance Alworth at wide receiver and Ron Mix at offensive tackle, along with quarterback John Hadl and running back Paul Lowe. Alworth made 543 receptions for 10,266 yards in a career of eleven AFL and NFL seasons. He set a record of 96 consecutive games with a reception. San Diego participated in four of the first five AFL Championship Games following their move: 1961, 1963, 1964, and 1965; winning only in 1963.

In the 1961 season, their first in San Diego, the team's defense made forty-nine pass interceptions. The term "Fearsome Foursome" described the 1961 Chargers' defensive players' lineup. The anchoring players were Earl Faison and Ernie Ladd. The "Fearsome Foursome" phrase was later used by other NFL teams. In 1961, the Chargers lost the championship to Houston 10–3, with 29,556 patrons attending the game at Balboa Stadium.

In 1962, the team went 4–10, losing eight of the final nine games of the season, mostly due to injuries.

In the 1963 season, eight Charger players scored in the final week. Paul Lowe rushed over 183 yards, scoring 2 touchdowns on 17 carries. In the final regular season game, the Chargers beat Denver 58–20 and became the AFL West champions. The season ended a week late due to a postponement of games after the assassination of President John F. Kennedy on November 22, 1963. The Chargers won the 1963 AFL Championship when they defeated the Boston Patriots 51–10. Spectators numbering 30,127 attended the game at Balboa Stadium. Running back Keith Lincoln's effort made up 349 yards of the total offense.

In 1964, the Chargers played the New York Jets resulting in a 17–17 tie. A reported attendance of 50,222 attended the game at Shea Stadium, New York. The game earned $46,828 in entrance fees. On Thanksgiving Day, Buffalo defeated the Chargers 27–24 at Balboa Stadium. The attendance was 34,865 spectators. The Chargers won their fourth AFL West title by defeating the Jets 38–3 before 25,753 spectators at Balboa Stadium. Lance Alworth left the game with a knee injury, and the fullback, Keith Lincoln was sidelined in the first quarter with a fractured rib. At the 1964 AFL Championship Game in Buffalo, the Chargers were defeated 20–7. The AFL teams signed a five-year television contract with the National Broadcasting Company for $36 million to commence in 1965.

On December 12, 1965, San Diego (9–2–3) won their fifth AFL West title by defeating Houston 37–26. Lowe finished first and Alworth second in the AFL Player of the Year honors. However, Buffalo would shutout the Chargers 23–0 in front of 30,361 spectators at Balboa Stadium for the 1965 AFL Championship. At half time, a new automobile, the "Charger," was introduced by Chrysler officials. It would enter production branded as a Dodge the following year.

In 1966, Hilton sold the Chargers to a 21-member group of business executives for $10 million. The leading investors were Eugene V. Klein and Sam Schulman. The Chargers finished third in the AFL West that season, 7–6–1. During the sale process, a then-23 year old Jerry Jones (who would go on to become the owner of the Dallas Cowboys) offered $5.8 million for the team, but backed off after his father disapproved of his plans.

=== 1967–1970 ===
In August 1967, the Chargers moved to newly completed San Diego Stadium, and played the NFL's Detroit Lions in a pre-season game with 45,988 spectators in attendance. Detroit defeated the Chargers 38–17. In the fifth week of the season, Leslie "Speedy" Duncan had 203 yards in returns, 35 yards on a fumble recovery for a touchdown, 68 yards on four kickoff returns, and 100 yards for a touchdown. In the Chargers' game against Kansas City, the team won 45–31 with a combined effort was 897 yards offense and 622 yards in returns. In the 11th week, the Chargers were defeated by Oakland 41–21 with 52,661 spectators at the game, alongside 2,018 closed-circuit television viewers in the San Diego Sports Arena.

In 1968, the Chargers played a first pre-season game at San Diego Stadium against the NFL's San Francisco 49ers. The Chargers won 30–18, before 39,553 spectators. "Speedy" Duncan set an AFL record with a 95-yard punt return for a touchdown in a game where the Chargers were defeated by the New York Jets 37–15. The Chargers came third in the West Division, with a 9–5 record. Quarterback John Hadl led the AFL that year with 440 pass attempts, 208 completions, 3,473 yards taken and 27 touchdown passes. He also led in passes intercepted, with 32.

In the 1969 season, the Chargers lost their first two games. They then defeated the Jets at home in front of 54,042 spectators. Joe Namath played for the Jets. Hadl and Alworth played for the Chargers. Alworth set a professional record with a pass reception in his 96th consecutive game. The Chargers won the next three games and then lost four. Their last game was against Buffalo where they won 45–6. The team finished with an 8–6 record and out of the playoffs. Charlie Waller, the offensive backfield coach was named head coach. Gillman had resigned after the season's ninth game due to illness but continued as the team's general manager.

=== 1970–1977: joining the NFL ===
In 1970, the San Diego Chargers settled into the AFC West division following the NFL merger with the AFL. The years after the merger were difficult for the Chargers. Charlie Waller took over as the head coach, but after finishing 5–6–3, he stepped down, and Gillman returned to the job. Gillman resigned midway through the 1971 season, which finished with six wins and eight losses.

On May 19, 1971, Ron East was sent to the San Diego Chargers as part of the "Bambi trade" that also involved Pettis Norman and Tony Liscio. In 1972, Duane Thomas and Deacon Jones joined the team, which finished with a 4–9–1 record. In 1973, veteran quarterback Johnny Unitas, formerly from the Baltimore Colts joined the Chargers. Unitas was almost 40 and had chronic injuries. He played three games and then was replaced by the rookie Dan Fouts. The Chargers finished with a 2–11–1 record.

In the 1974 season, Fouts was named the new the starting quarterback. Don Woods also joined the team. Woods ran for over 1,000 yards but the team had a 5–9 record. However, in 1975, Woods and Fouts underperformed and the team finished 2–12 after facing the possibility of the first-ever 0–14 season until beating the Kansas City Chiefs in their twelfth game.

In 1976, the Chargers began with a three-game win streak but finished with a 6–8 record. In 1977, the Chargers again began strongly. However, the team lost four out of five games. Fouts in a contract dispute did not report to training camp; and held out until it was resolved when he rejoined his team for the eleventh game. They went 2–2, losing to the powerhouse Steelers and Broncos by a combined total of nine points. The team finished 7–7.

== Air Coryell era (1978–1986) ==
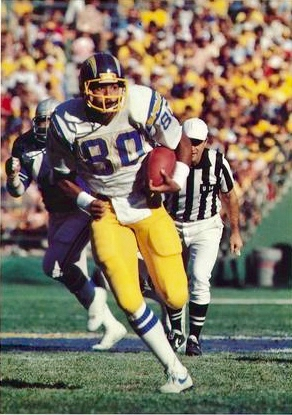
Hall of Fame TE Kellen Winslow

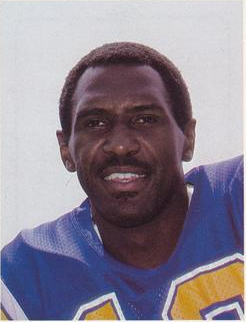
Hall of Fame WR Charlie Joiner

In 1978, San Diego hired head coach Don Coryell, who would coach the team until 1986. Coryell developed a pass-heavy offensive scheme and philosophy called Air Coryell and also known as the "Coryell offense" or the "vertical offense". With Dan Fouts as quarterback, the San Diego Chargers' offense was among the greatest and most exciting passing offenses in National Football League history, setting league and individual offensive records. The Chargers led the league in passing yards an NFL record six consecutive years from 1978 to 1983 and again in 1985. They also led the league in total yards in offense in each of those seasons. Under the tutelage of Coryell, Dan Fouts, wide receiver Charlie Joiner, and tight end Kellen Winslow blossomed on the field and would all be inducted into the Pro Football Hall of Fame. The Chargers earned four consecutive playoff appearances (1979–1982) during the Air Coryell era, including three AFC West division titles from 1979 to 1981.

=== 1978 ===
In 1978, the NFL increased the season schedule to sixteen games. The rules were changed so that defensive backs could no longer block wide receivers more than five yards beyond the line of scrimmage.

In the opening game of the season, the Chargers beat Seattle 24–20. On September 10, 1978, the second game was played against the Oakland Raiders at Jack Murphy Stadium in San Diego. The game became known as the "Holy Roller" game, or, the "Immaculate Deception" because the Raiders made a game-winning play. With 10 seconds left in the game, the Raiders had possession of the ball at the Chargers' 14-yard line. The Chargers were ahead 20–14. The Raiders quarterback, Ken Stabler, took the snap but was about to be sacked by the Chargers' line-backer, Woodrow Lowe on the 24-yard line. Stabler fumbled the ball forward, and it rolled forward towards the San Diego goal line. Running back, Pete Banaszak, tried to recover the ball on the 12-yard line, but could not keep his footing, and the ball was pushed even closer to the end zone. The Raiders' tight end, Dave Casper, was the next player to reach the ball but he also could not get a hand on it. He batted and kicked the ball into the end zone, where he fell on it for the game-tying touchdown as time ran out. With the ensuing extra point by kicker, Errol Mann, the Raiders won 21–20.

The Chargers' fans saw the fumble as an incomplete pass or an intentional grounding. In the remaining minutes of the game, the teams battled for the ball towards the end zone where the Raiders ultimately recovered it for a touchdown.

The Chargers lost their third game to Denver and then in week four played the Green Bay Packers in an interconference match in San Diego. At the kickoff, the temperature was around 102 °F or 38.9 °C. The Packers won 24–3. After this loss, the Chargers' head coach, Tommy Prothro was dismissed. He was replaced by Don Coryell of the St. Louis Cardinals.

In New England, the Chargers won their first game under Coryell's coaching. When they returned, San Diego was still recovering from the recent PSA Flight 182. The Chargers' defeating Denver in San Diego was morale boosting for the city. Coryell coached the team in his "Air Coryell" offense: Fouts threw to a trio of receivers (Charlie Joiner, John Jefferson and tight end Kellen Winslow). The Chargers won nine games and lost seven, thus missing the playoffs.

=== 1979 ===
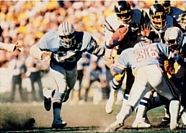
The Chargers attempting to rush the ball through the Oilers' defensive line during the 1979 AFC Divisional Playoff Game

In 1979, The Sporting News named the Chargers' team general manager, Johnny Sanders, the NFL Executive of the Year. Fouts set an NFL record by playing four consecutive 300-yard passing games. His achievement was established in a game in which he threw over 303 yards against the Oakland Raiders. The Chargers defeated the New Orleans Saints 35–0 and proceeded to the playoffs, the first time in fourteen years. On December 17, 1979, the Chargers won their first AFC West division title by defeating the Denver Broncos 17–7 before a national Monday Night Football television audience and their home crowd. In the divisional round, the Houston Oilers defeated the Chargers 17–14. Ron Mix became the second AFL player and second Charger to be nominated to the Pro Football Hall of Fame. The announcement was made during the half-time of the AFC-NFC Pro Bowl.

=== 1980 ===
In 1980, running back Chuck Muncie was traded to the team from the New Orleans Saints. Fouts set a club record with 444 yards passing in the Chargers' 44–7 defeat of the New York Giants. Kellen Winslow caught 10 passes for 171 yards. The Chargers defeated the Pittsburgh Steelers 26–17, winning their second straight AFC West title. They finished the season with 11–5 losses, a record for the team.

Jefferson (1,340), Winslow (1,290), and Joiner (1,132) became the first three players on the same team to have 1,000 yards receiving in a season. The Chargers' defense led the NFL in sacks (60). The defensive front line included the 1975 Chargers' draftees Fred Dean, Gary "Big Hands" Johnson and Louie Kelcher. Together with Leroy Jones, the front line was known as the "Bruise Brothers".

In the playoffs, the Chargers defeated the Buffalo Bills 20–14. However, their season ended in the AFC Championship Game at the hands of the eventual Super Bowl champion Oakland Raiders 34–27.

=== 1981 ===
In 1981, the Chargers won their third straight AFC West title with a 10–6 record. After the division titles of the 1979 and 1980 seasons, contract disputes arose. Klein, the team owner, refused to renegotiate players' contracts. The Chargers' owner traded the wide receiver, John Jefferson, to the Green Bay Packers after a salary raise could not be agreed upon. Jefferson was replaced by Wes Chandler. Defensive end Dean was traded to the 49ers, again after a pay dispute. Dean said his wage was similar to that of his brother, a truck driver. Playing only eleven games, Dean would nonetheless become the UPI NFC Defensive Player of the Year. In 1980 and 1981, without Jefferson, the Chargers no longer had the most passing yards in the NFL.

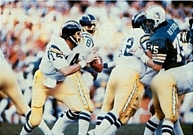
Dan Fouts led the Chargers to several postseason runs from 1979 to 1982, including the famous "Epic in Miami" 1981 AFC Divisional Playoff game.

"I can't say how much it [Dean's leaving] affected us, because we did make it to the AFC championship game", said Johnson on the loss of fellow lineman Dean. "But I could say if we had more pass rush from the corner, it might've been different."

In the 1981 playoffs divisional round, the Chargers defeated the Miami Dolphins 41–38 at the Miami Orange Bowl where the temperature on a humid day was 85 °F or 29.4 °C. The game became known as "The Epic in Miami". ESPN journalists named the epic the best game in NFL history. Both teams showed strong offense. The Chargers were led by Fouts who made an NFL single season record of 4,802 yards and 33 touchdowns.

This game set records for the most points scored in a playoff game (79 points); the greatest total yards by both teams (1,036 yards); and the most passing yards by both teams (809 yards).

The Chargers placekicker, Rolf Benirschke kicked the winning 29-yard field goal after 13 minutes and 52 seconds overtime. The tight end, Kellen Winslow, made 13 receptions for 166 yards, a touchdown and one blocked field goal. He became exhausted and was assisted from the field by his teammates. The win sent the Chargers to their second consecutive AFC Championship Game.

At the AFC Championship game in Cincinnati, the Bengals defeated the Chargers 27–7. The game became known as the "Freezer Bowl". The temperature was a record low −9 °F or −22.8 °C with a wind-chill factor of −59 °F or −50.6 °C.

=== 1982–1986 ===
During the strike-shortened 1982 season, Fouts averaged 320 yards passing per game. At that time, that average was a record. The Chargers defeated San Francisco 41 points to 37 and Cincinnati 50 points to 34. In each game, Fouts threw for over 400 yards. In the game against Cincinnati on December 20, 1982, the Chargers' made 501 yards passing and 175 yards rushing. Chandler set a record of 129 yards receiving per game. The Chargers reached the playoffs for the fourth straight year, finishing fifth in the AFC (divisional standings were disregarded due to the abbreviated schedule). The team upset the Pittsburgh Steelers in Pittsburgh 31–28, but the Dolphins would exact revenge from their loss the previous year the next week 34–17.

1983 saw the Chargers fall to 6–10 and equal last in their division, despite having the league's most passing yards for the sixth consecutive season. In 1984, Klein decreased salaries in preparation for the team's sale. The defensive linemen, Johnson and Kelcher, left for San Francisco. On August 1, 1984, Alex Spanos purchased a majority interest in the Chargers. Benirschke was named "Miller Man of the Year". Joiner set an NFL record with his 650th pass reception in the fourth quarter of the game at Pittsburgh.

In 1985 offensive guard Ed White set an NFL record by playing in 241 NFL games. Lionel "Little Train" James, a 5'6", 171 pound running back, set an NFL record of 2,535 all-purpose yards and of 1,027 receiving yards by a running back.

== Changing head coaches (1986–1993) ==
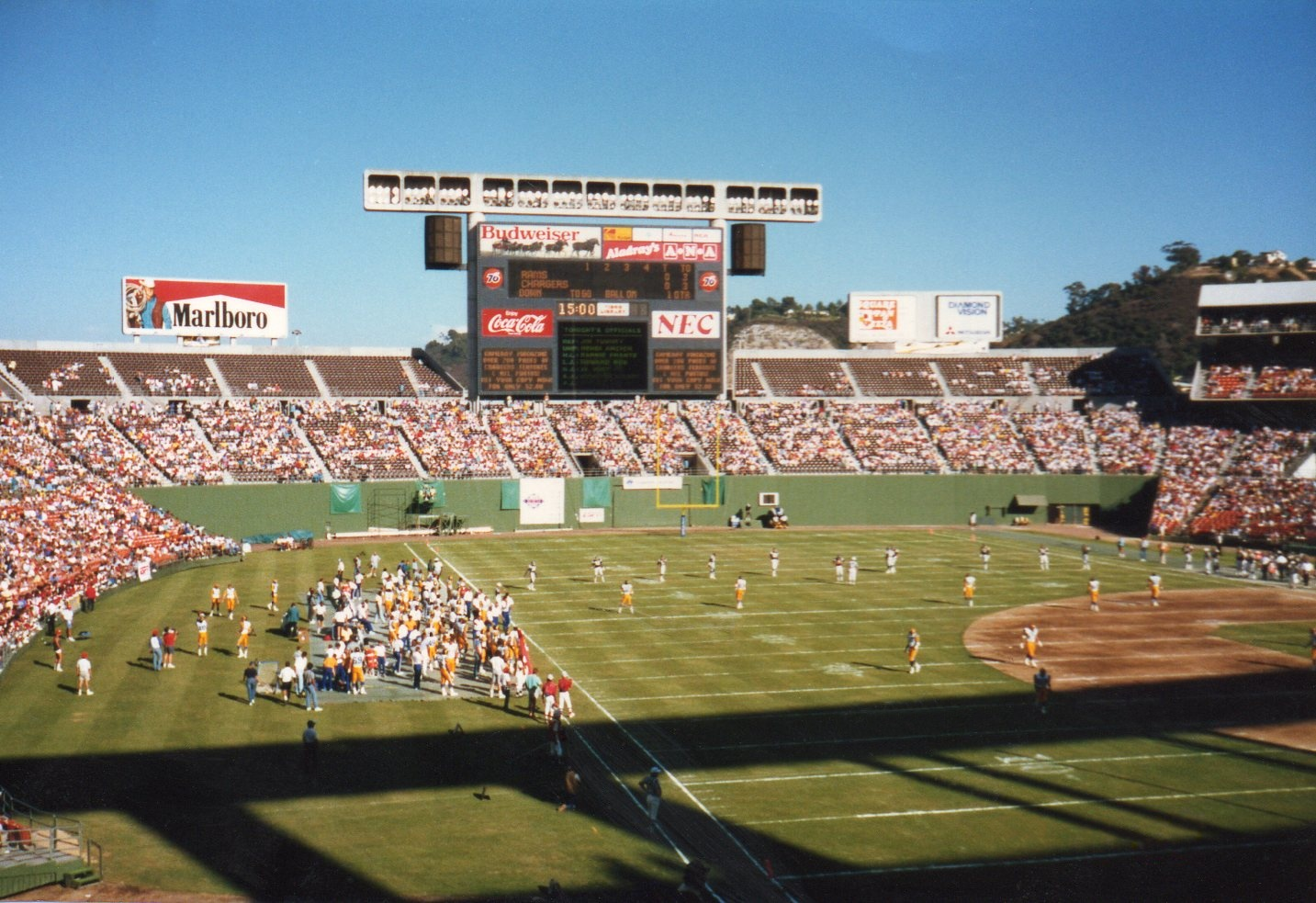
The Chargers hosting a pre-season game at San Diego Jack Murphy Stadium in 1987

During the 1986 season, following the resignation of Coryell, Al Saunders was named head coach.

In 1987, Joiner retired to become the Chargers' receivers' coach. The team finished the season 8–7, including a 3–0 record by the "replacement" team during the player's strike. The only other team to go undefeated during that time was the Super Bowl Champion Washington Redskins. In 1988 Fouts retired after a 15-year career. He set seven NFL records and 42 club records, and became the NFL's second most prolific passer of all time with 43,040 yards. Fouts's jersey, the number 14, was retired at halftime at the "Dan Fouts Day" game in San Diego.

In the 1989 season, Dan Henning, a former Chargers' quarterback, Washington Redskins assistant, and Atlanta Falcons head coach, became the Chargers' head coach. A first year running back, Marion Butts, set a club record with 39 carries and a team rookie record of 176 yards in the Chargers' 20 points to 13 win against Kansas City. Steve Ortmayer, the director of football operations for the past three years, left and was replaced by Bobby Beathard. The team would post double-digit losses between 1988 and 1991.

In the 1992 season, Bobby Ross became the Chargers' head coach. Quarterback, Stan Humphries was obtained in a trade with the Washington Redskins. The Chargers finished the season 11–5 and won the AFC West title, making their first playoff appearance in a decade. Ross was named AFC Coach of the Year. In the wild-card round, the Chargers shut out the Kansas City Chiefs 17–0. Then, they were shut out by the Miami Dolphins in the divisional round, 31–0.

In 1993, the Chargers finished 8–8, finishing fourth in the division.

== 1994–2005 ==
=== 1994: AFC Champions ===
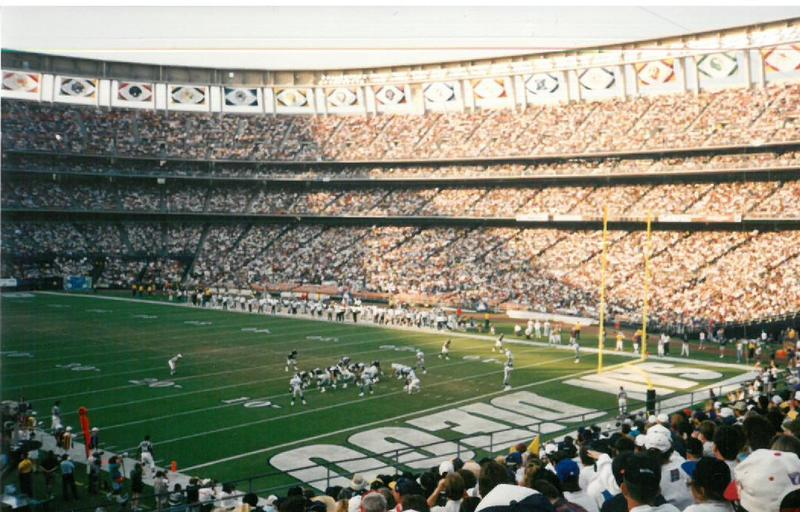
The Chargers (navy blue shirts) on offense, preparing to run a play against the Seattle Seahawks in Week 9 of the 1994 NFL season at Jack Murphy Stadium

In the 1994 season, the Chargers won 11–5. Quarterback Stan Humphries and wide receiver Tony Martin, worked together to make a 99-yard touchdown completion. The players contributing to the Chargers' 1994 AFC West Division championship included linebacker Junior Seau, defensive tackles Reuben Davis and Shawn Lee and defensive end, Leslie O'Neal, and running back Natrone Means, Humphries and Martin who made offensive moves. In the playoffs, the Chargers unexpectedly defeated the Dolphins 22–21 in the divisional round and the Steelers 17–13 in the AFC Championship Game. The Chargers were defeated by the 49ers 49–26 in Super Bowl XXIX.

Despite the Super Bowl loss, Beathard, who was responsible for the team lineup and choice of coach, was named the "NFL's Smartest Man" by Sports Illustrated. However, the Chargers' 1995 season proved less successful. The team reached the playoffs with a 9–7 record but was defeated by the Indianapolis Colts 35–20.

=== 1996–2001 ===
During the 1996 season, running back Rodney Culver was killed in the crash of ValuJet Flight 592 in the Florida Everglades. Linebacker David Griggs had been killed in a single-car crash in Davie, Florida eleven months earlier.

In the 1997 season, Beathard dismissed Ross. Kevin Gilbride became the Chargers' new head coach. Gilbride encouraged a more open passing attack, a major change in offensive style. Humphries suffered several concussions due to a lack of pass protection and retired. After trades of players and draft choices to the Arizona Cardinals, Beathard selected quarterback Ryan Leaf with the second pick of the 1998 NFL draft.

In the 1998 season, the Chargers went 5–11. Rodney Harrison said, "If I had to go through another year like that, I'd probably quit playing." When Gilbride left, he was replaced by an interim head coach, June Jones, a member of the Chargers' staff. Jones left the team at the end of the 1998 season to coach at the University of Hawaii. The Chargers' new head coach was Mike Riley from Oregon State University. Due to his poor play and attitude, Leaf was released after the 2000 season. Jim Harbaugh, who was acquired in a trade with the Baltimore Ravens for a conditional draft choice in 2000, became the Chargers' starting quarterback.

Beathard retired in April 2000 and was replaced in January 2001 by John Butler, former general manager of the Bills. From 1996 to 2003, the Chargers had eight consecutive seasons where they finished with just as many, if not more losses than wins.

In 2001, Riley chose Norv Turner, a former head coach of the Redskins, as his offensive coordinator. Turner proposed an offense method which he had employed at the Dallas Cowboys. The Chargers signed former Buffalo Bills quarterback Doug Flutie and also traded the team's first overall selection in the 2001 NFL draft to the Atlanta Falcons in return for the first-round selection (fifth overall) and third-round selection in the same draft. In addition the Chargers obtained the wide receiver-kick returner, Tim Dwight, and the Falcons' second-round draft selection in the 2002 NFL draft. The Chargers used those selections in the 2001 draft to select Texas Christian University running back LaDainian Tomlinson and Purdue University quarterback Drew Brees.

=== 2002–2005: Marty Schottenheimer era ===
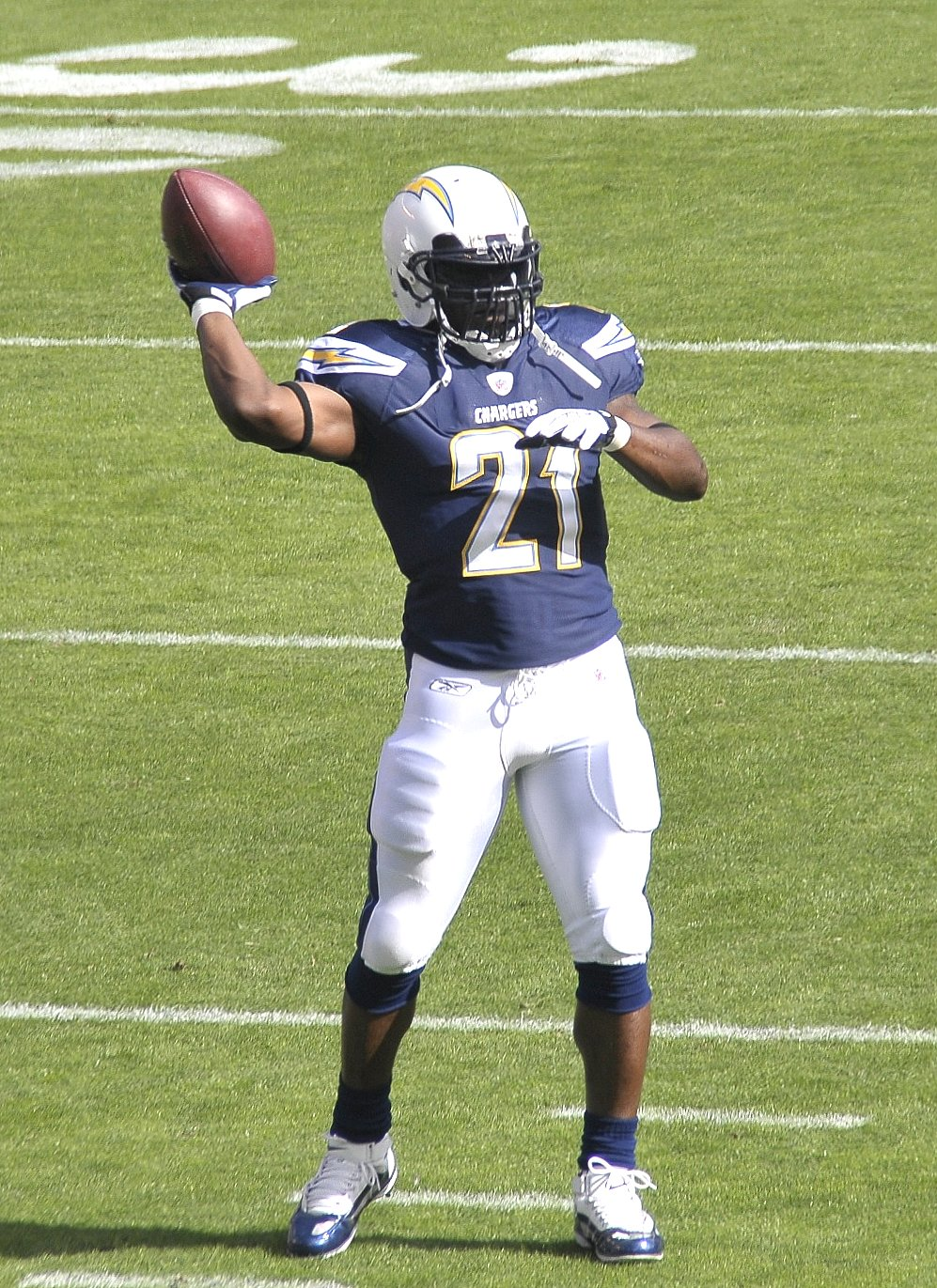
Hall of Fame RB LaDainian Tomlinson spent nine years with San Diego; earning five Pro Bowl appearances and was voted NFL MVP in 2006 after breaking the record for touchdowns in a single season (31).

For the 2002 season, Marty Schottenheimer replaced Riley. Under Schottenheimer, the Chargers won their first four games. Butler would succumb to cancer after a nine-month struggle in April 2003, and was replaced by A. J. Smith, who was named Executive Vice President and General Manager.

In 2003, the Chargers traded Seau to the Dolphins for a draft pick in the 2004 NFL draft. Before he left, Seau's teammates awarded him the Emil Karas Award for the team's Most Inspirational Player. Tomlinson accumulated 195 total yards from scrimmage in a late season game against the Packers to raise his season total to 2,011. He became the first Charger and the eighth player in NFL history to record consecutive 2,000-yard seasons. Tomlinson also became the first player in NFL history to rush for 1,000 yards and catch 100 passes in the same season. The Chargers were the host team for the Super Bowl XXXII and Super Bowl XXXVII.

The 2004 season saw the Chargers win their first divisional title since 1994 with a 12–4 record. They quickly were eliminated by the New York Jets in the first round of the playoffs, 20–17 in overtime.

During the 2005 NFL draft, the Chargers drafted key rookies who would help carry the momentum from the 2004 success. The Chargers used their first pick to gain Shawne Merriman from the University of Maryland. Their next picks included Luis Castillo from Northwestern University, Vincent Jackson from Northern Colorado, Darren Sproles from Kansas State, Wesley Britt from Alabama, Wes Sims from Oklahoma, and center, Scott Mruczkowski from Bowling Green.

The Chargers lost their first game of the 2005 season to the Dallas Cowboys at home 28–24, and their second game 20–17 in Denver against the Broncos. Through Tomlinson's efforts, the Chargers won their third game at home against the New York Giants. Tomlinson took 220 yards in total, 3 rushing touchdowns, and threw for a touchdown helping the team to win 45–23. The Chargers then defeated the defending Super Bowl Champion New England Patriots 41–17. For their fifth game against the Pittsburgh Steelers, the Chargers wore their throwback uniforms. The Steelers defeated the Chargers 24–22 after Jeff Reed made a 40-yard field goal. The Chargers won the sixth game against the Oakland Raiders, 27–14. In the seventh game, against the Eagles in Philadelphia, the Chargers were leading 17–13 until late in the game. Then, a Chargers' field goal was blocked and returned 65 yards by Matt Ware. This led to a game-winning touchdown for the Eagles to prevail by 20 to 17.

After winning three games and losing four, the Chargers won the following five games. These included a 28–20 win at home against the Kansas City Chiefs and a 31–26 away win against the New York Jets. The tenth week was a bye, followed by a 48–10 home win in throwback uniforms against the Buffalo Bills. Then, the team won against the Washington Redskins, 23–17 in overtime and the next week against the Oakland Raiders at home, 34–10.

The Chargers were defeated 23–21 by the Miami Dolphins. On December 18, 2005, the Chargers defeated the Indianapolis Colts, 26–17 who had won their previous 13 games. The Kansas City Chiefs then defeated the Chargers 20–7, and the team was officially eliminated from playoff contention. The Chargers lost their final game of the season 23–7 to the Denver Broncos. The Chargers completed the 2005 season with a 9–7 record.

== 2006–2012: Rise of Philip Rivers ==
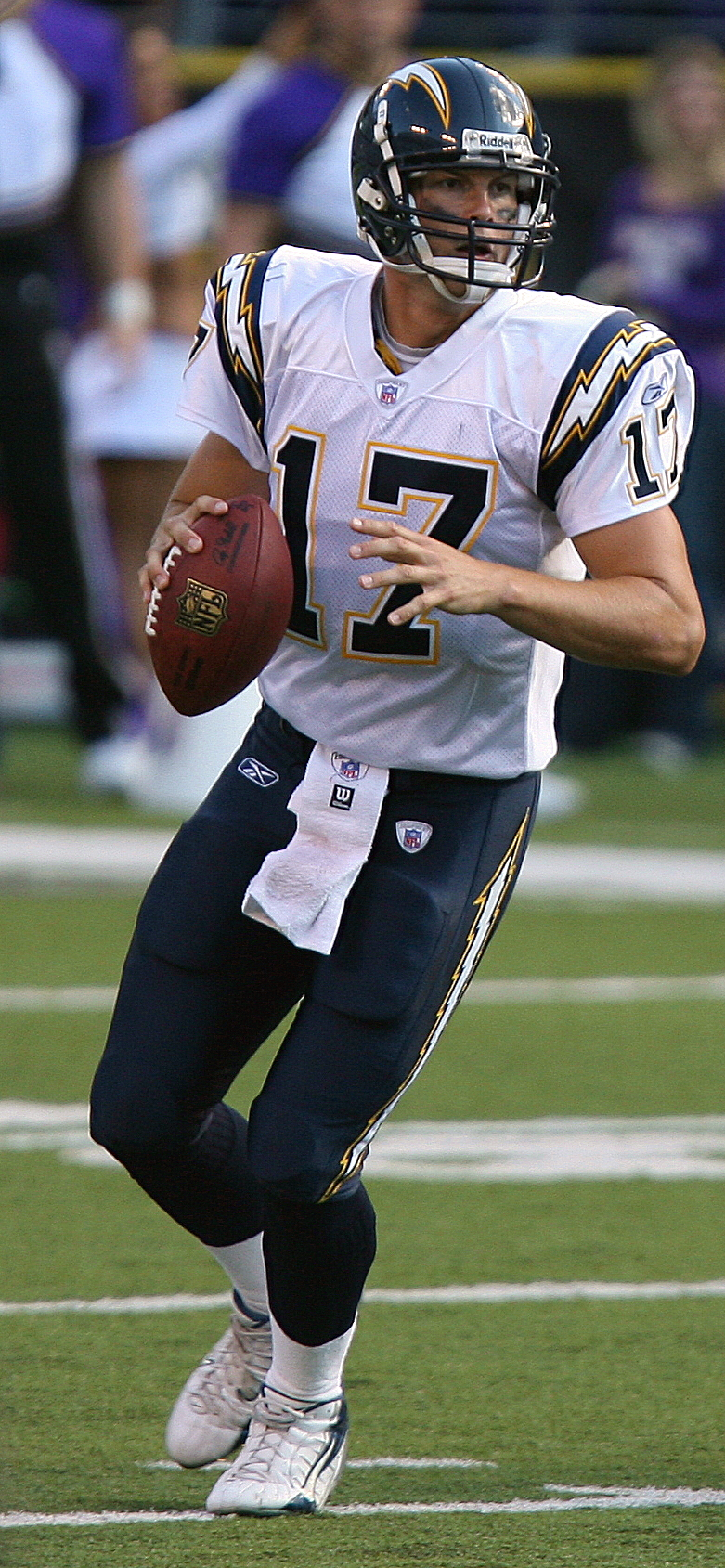
Philip Rivers during his first season as starting quarterback in 2006. Rivers compiled 252 total starts in a row with the Chargers and later the Indianapolis Colts before retiring after the 2020 season, resulting in the second longest streak of consecutive starts in NFL history.

In the 2006 season, the Chargers finished the season 14–2, their best record ever. Their only losses came against the Ravens and Chiefs. The team lost Drew Brees in free agency to the New Orleans Saints, setting the stage for 2004 draft pick Philip Rivers to take over at quarterback. They were seeded first in the AFC playoffs. In the divisional round, the Chargers were defeated by the Patriots 24–21. After the season, Schottenheimer left and Norv Turner became the head coach.

In the 2007 season, the Chargers went 11–5 and defeated the Tennessee Titans and Indianapolis Colts in the first two playoff rounds, before being defeated by the Patriots in the AFC championship game.

In the 2008 season, the Chargers posted an 8–8 record. Despite that, they won the AFC West title over a weak field. The Chargers defeated the Colts 23–17 in the wild card round but lost to the Steelers 35–24, in the divisional round.

In the 2009 season the Chargers won their first two games but lost their next three. For the rest of the season the Chargers won each game, including those against the NFC East teams. Having lost a game against the Broncos, the Chargers defeated them in the eleventh week, 32–3. In the twelfth week, the Chargers defeated the Cleveland Browns 30–23, and LaDainian Tomlinson broke Jim Brown's rushing record and Brown congratulated Tomlinson afterwards. The Chargers secured another division title and became the AFC second seed. The Chargers then played the Jets at home on January 17, 2010, and lost 17–14.

=== 2010–2012 ===
Prior to the 2010 season Tomlinson departed. He was aging and an expensive contract. The Chargers lost the first game to Kansas City, 21–14. The second game was at home was a win against the Jaguars. However, low ticket sales resulted in a blackout. The third game, an away game, was a 27–20 loss against Seattle. The fourth game was a win for the Chargers against the Cardinals, 41–10 at home, again with a local television blackout. Then in the next game, after many wins against the Raiders, the Chargers were defeated by them. The Chargers won the next four games then again were defeated by the Raiders at home, 28 points to 13. After a game where they tied with the Raiders, the Chargers were defeated by the Bengals 34–20 and missed the playoffs for the first time since 2005. The Chargers defeated Denver and ended the season with a 9–7 record.

The Chargers finished the season as the eighth team in NFL history to rank first in overall offense (395.6 yards/game), and overall defense (271.6 yards/game). Despite these statistics, the team did not make the playoffs, a situation only shared with the 1953 Eagles team. The Chargers ended the season second to the Colts in passing yards per game (282.4), second to the Patriots in points scored per game (27.6), first in passing yards allowed per game (177.8), fourth in rushing yards allowed per game (93.8), and tied for second in sacks (47). In contrast, the Chargers gave up the most punt return yards per game (18.9) and gave 29 turnovers. Rivers had a career highlight of 4,710 yards, 294 yards passing per game, 66 percent completion; 30 TDs, 13 INTs and a 101.8 passer rating. Tolbert made 11 rushing TDs and Gates made 10 receiving TDs. Phillips made 11 sacks.

The Chargers started the 2011 season 4–1 before losing to the Patriots. They went on to lose to the Jets, Chiefs, Packers, Raiders, the Bears and Broncos. The team was fraught with injuries. On December 5, 2011, the Chargers defeated the Jacksonville Jaguars. Three wins followed including a solid defeat of the Ravens. The Chargers were then defeated 38–10 by the Detroit Lions. After a 38–26 win against the Raiders in the seventeenth week, the Chargers finished the season with an 8–8 record. The Chargers, Broncos and Raiders all finished 8–8, but the Broncos won the AFC West by virtue of tiebreakers.

During a game on October 21, 2012, a line judge saw what he thought was a suspicious substance, such as a banned adhesive, on hand towels used by the Chargers’ players. However, on November 7, the NFL announced that the Chargers did not cheat. Even so, the team was fined $20,000. After the 2012 season where the Chargers again failed to reach the playoffs, Smith and Turner were dismissed.

== Final years in San Diego (2013–2016) ==
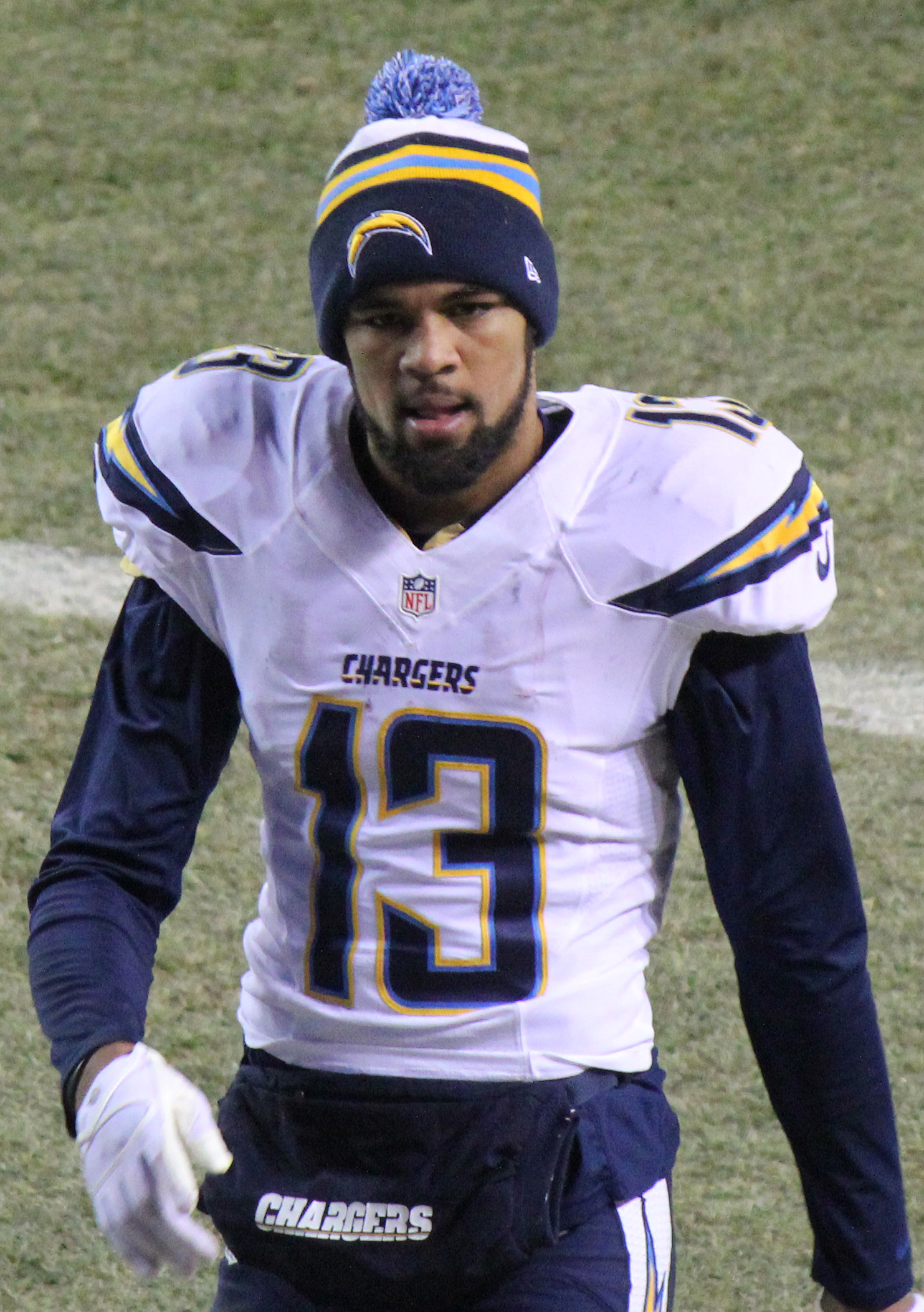
Wide receiver Keenan Allen with San Diego during his rookie season in 2013.

On January 9, 2013, the Chargers announced that Tom Telesco, former Vice President of Football Operations for the Indianapolis Colts, would become the Chargers' general manager. On January 15, 2013, Broncos offensive coordinator, Mike McCoy, was hired as the Chargers' new head coach and Ken Whisenhunt as offensive coordinator. D. J. Fluker, Manti Te'o, and Keenan Allen were selected in the first three rounds of the 2013 NFL draft.

Under McCoy, the Chargers won two and lost three games. The team then defeated Indianapolis in the Monday Night Football and then Jacksonville. After a bye, the Chargers won four of the next five games. They then won all the remaining regular season games. The team finished 9–7, and made the playoffs as a Wild Card team. On the 50th anniversary of the 1963 AFL Championship, the Chargers beat Cincinnati 27–10. In the wild card playoff, Denver defeated the Chargers 24–17.

On January 13, 2014, Ken Whisenhunt left the team to join the Titans. On January 14, 2014, the Chargers announced Frank Reich, the quarterback coach, would replace Whisenhunt as the team's offensive coordinator. The Chargers also brought back Donald Butler, Chad Rinehart, and Darrell Stuckey; dismissed Derek Cox; and engaged the running back Donald Brown. The Chargers selected Jason Verrett, Jeremiah Attaochu, and Chris Watt in the first three rounds of the 2014 NFL draft.

In September and October 2014, the Chargers won five games after losing their first game of the season and then lost a further three games. Some players sustained injuries and the team finished the season with nine wins and seven losses. The Chargers did not qualify to enter the playoffs. In three of their last four games, and five of their last eight, the Chargers did not score more than one touchdown. Compared to 2013, the offense dropped in points (from 12th in the league to 17th), yards (5th to 18th), first downs (3rd to 15th), net yards per pass (2nd to 8th), rushing yards (13th to 30th) and yards per rush (21st to 31st). It was the second time in three years the team had finished second-to-last in yards per carry. In the AFC West division the Chargers finished the season with two wins and four losses.

In the 2015 NFL draft, the Chargers selected Melvin Gordon, Denzel Perryman, and Craig Mager in the first three rounds. The season started off with a win against the Detroit Lions at home. The Chargers lost to the Cincinnati Bengals and Minnesota Vikings in away games before defeating the Cleveland Browns on a last second field goal. Following their two wins and two losses, the Chargers lost their next six games to the Pittsburgh Steelers, Green Bay Packers, Baltimore Ravens, the Chicago Bears, and the Oakland Raiders and the Kansas City Chiefs. The Chargers then won against the Jaguars in an away game. In week 15, defeated the Miami Dolphins, 30–14. The Chargers finished the season in last place in the AFC West and third-last ahead of the Titans and the Browns in the American Football Conference with a 4–12 record.

The Chargers drafted defensive end Joey Bosa in the third overall pick of the 2016 draft. Other selections included Hunter Henry, Max Tuerk, Joshua Perry, Jatavis Brown, Drew Kaser, Derek Watt, and Donavon Clark.

The Chargers started their 2016 season in Kansas City, playing against the Chiefs and at half time, held a lead of 21–3. The Chiefs rallied in the second half, defeating the Chargers 33–27. In San Diego, the Chargers defeated the Jaguars 38–14. Running back Danny Woodhead did not play due to an anterior cruciate ligament injury. The Chargers then lost to the Colts, the Saints and the Raiders before winning against the Broncos 21–13 and the Falcons, 33–30. There were further losses including to the Dolphins, 31–24; to Kansas City, 37–27 in San Diego; and to the Browns in week 16.

== Return to Los Angeles (2017–present) ==
The owner of the Chargers, Dean Spanos advocated for many years for the city of San Diego to build a new stadium. With no success, the Chargers, in association with the Raiders, planned to construct a new stadium in Carson, California.

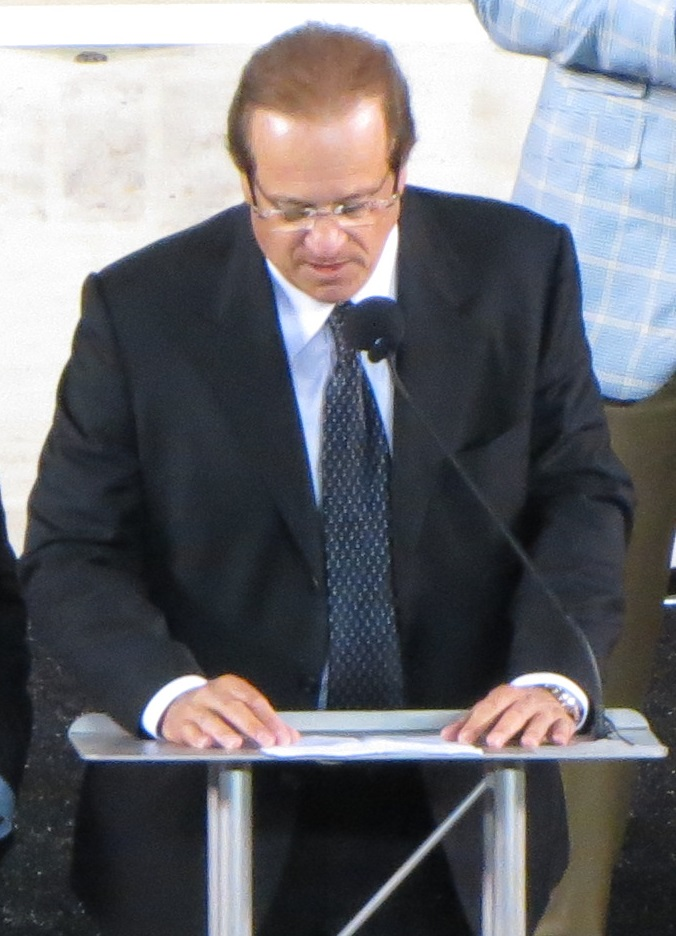
After a proposed ballot measure for a hotel tax financed stadium plan in downtown San Diego failed in November 2016 with 43 percent approval, owner Dean Spanos (pictured) exercised the option to relocate the team to Los Angeles.

Immediately after the conclusion of the 2015 season, the Chargers, Rams, and Raiders all filed applications to relocate to Los Angeles. On January 12, 2016, the NFL owners voted 30–2 to allow the Rams to return to Los Angeles, approving their Inglewood stadium project. The Chargers, however, were given an approval to relocate in one year's time, under the condition they negotiate a lease or partnership agreement with the Rams. The Chargers registered the trademark, "Los Angeles Chargers". They submitted to the City of Santa Ana the grading and landscape plans for a five-acre parcel of land which would serve as an interim headquarters and training facility. The Chargers and Rams came to an agreement in principle on sharing the planned City of Champions Stadium to commence on January 29, 2016. Both teams would contribute a $200 million stadium loan from the NFL and personal seat license fees to the construction costs and would pay $1 per year in rent to the facility's controlling entity, StadCo LA, LLC.

The NFL then encouraged the Chargers to stay in San Diego by offering the team $100 million if they were to enter into an agreement with the city of San Diego. On January 29, 2016, Spanos, the Chargers' chief executive officer, announced that the team would remain in San Diego for the season. The Chargers continued to seek public approval of a new stadium in San Diego. On February 23, 2016, the Chargers announced that their preferred location for a new stadium was the East Village, in downtown San Diego. The funds for the stadium would come from the team, the NFL and the City of San Diego. Even though it was a more economical proposal, the Chargers dismissed the city's alternative plan for a stadium in Mission Valley. Between April 21 and June 10, 2016, the Chargers collected 110,786 signatures in support of a new downtown stadium.

On July 9, 2016, the San Diego city clerk received the signatures and on July 18, 2016, the San Diego City Council voted unanimously to put the downtown stadium plan to a public ballot. On July 28, 2016, the San Diego Regional Chamber of Commerce announced its support of the Chargers' downtown stadium proposal, and on October 3, 2016, Mayor Kevin Faulconer announced his support. However, on November 8, 2016, the proposal (Measure C) failed to receive support at public ballot (57 percent against and 43 percent for).

In December 2016, the NFL owners approved the terms of a lease agreement between the Chargers and the Rams and the Chargers debt ceiling. On December 23, 2016, the Chargers leased a property of approximately 3 acres in Costa Mesa for offices, practice fields, and training facilities.

On January 12, 2017, Spanos announced the Chargers would move back to Los Angeles for the 2017 season. The team would play at Dignity Health Sports Park (known as the StubHub Center until 2019) in Carson, and beginning with the 2020 season, play at SoFi Stadium.

In 2017, when the Chargers moved their practice facility to Orange County, the Chargers removed all references to the city of San Diego from their website and merchandise.

In returning to Los Angeles, the Chargers became the third franchise to relocate to a previous home city (after the Raiders, who left Oakland in 1981 and returned in 1995, and the Rams, who left Los Angeles in 1994 and returned in 2016). Additionally, they were the second former San Diego franchise to play in the City of Angels (after the Clippers, who relocated in 1984).

As of the 2025 NFL season, linebacker Denzel Perryman is the last active player on the Chargers who played in San Diego (albeit with two stints) following the release of defensive end Joey Bosa.

== Records ==
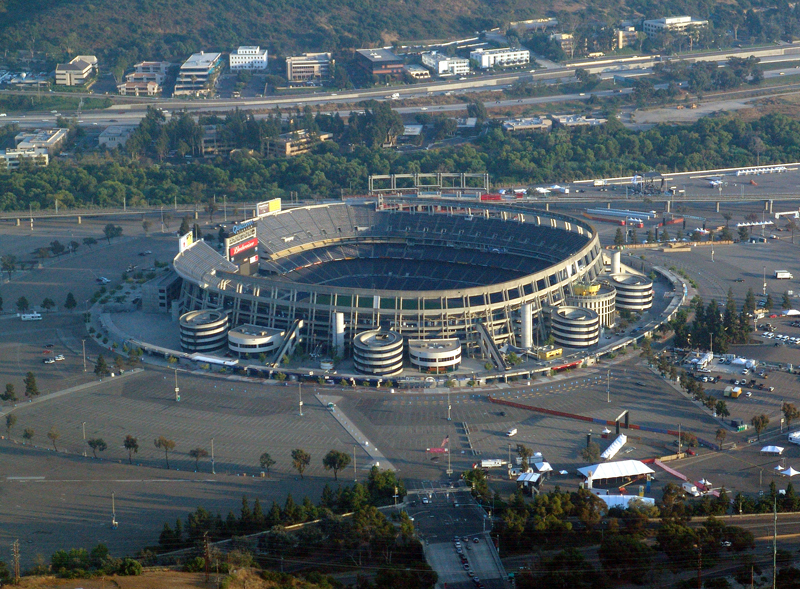
San Diego Stadium, where the Chargers played their home games from 1967 to 2016

=== Seasons ===
AFL champions (1960–1969)	Conference champions	Division champions	Wild card berth

Season	Team	League	Conference	Division	Regular season				Postseason results	Awards	Head coaches
Season	Team	League	Conference	Division	Finish	Wins	Losses	Ties	Postseason results	Awards	Head coaches
San Diego Chargers
1961	1961	AFL		West	1st	12	2	0	Lost AFL Championship (Oilers) 10–3		Sid Gillman
1962	1962	AFL		West	3rd	4	10	0		Earl Faison (ASG MVP)	Sid Gillman
1963	1963	AFL		West	1st	11	3	0	Won AFL Championship (1) (Patriots) 51–10	Lance Alworth (MVP); Keith Lincoln (ASG MVP)	Sid Gillman
1964	1964	AFL		West	1st	8	5	1	Lost AFL Championship (Bills) 20–7	Keith Lincoln (ASG MVP)	Sid Gillman
1965	1965	AFL		West	1st	9	2	3	Lost AFL Championship (Bills) 23–0	Frank Buncom (ASG MVP)	Sid Gillman
1966	1966	AFL		West	3rd	7	6	1			Sid Gillman
1967	1967	AFL		West	3rd	8	5	1		Speedy Duncan (ASG MVP)	Sid Gillman
1968	1968	AFL		West	3rd	9	5	0			Sid Gillman
1969	1969	AFL		West	3rd	8	6	0		John Hadl (ASG MVP)	Charlie Waller
1970^{[A]}	1970	NFL	AFC	West	3rd	5	6	3			Charlie Waller
1971	1971	NFL	AFC	West	3rd	6	8	0			Harland Svare (2–2); Sid Gillman (4–6)
1972	1972	NFL	AFC	West	4th	4	9	1			Harland Svare
1973	1973	NFL	AFC	West	4th	2	11	1			Harland Svare (1–6–1); Ron Waller (1–5)
1974	1974	NFL	AFC	West	3rd	5	9	0		Don Woods (OROY)	Tommy Prothro
1975	1975	NFL	AFC	West	4th	2	12	0			Tommy Prothro
1976	1976	NFL	AFC	West	3rd	6	8	0			Tommy Prothro
1977	1977	NFL	AFC	West	3rd	7	7	0			Tommy Prothro
1978	1978^{[B]}	NFL	AFC	West	3rd	9	7	0			Tommy Prothro (1–3); Don Coryell (8–4)
1979	1979	NFL	AFC	West	1st	12	4	0	Lost AFC Divisional Playoffs (Oilers) 17–14		Don Coryell
1980	1980	NFL	AFC	West	1st^{[C]}	11	5	0	Won AFC Divisional Playoffs (Bills) 20–14; Lost AFC Championship (Raiders) 34–27		Don Coryell
1981	1981	NFL	AFC	West	1st^{[D]}	10	6	0	Won AFC Divisional Playoffs (Dolphins) 41–38 (OT)^{[E]} Lost AFC Championship (Bengals)^{[F]} 27–7	Kellen Winslow (PB MVP)	Don Coryell
1982^{[G]}	1982	NFL	AFC		6th	6	3	0	Won AFC First-Round Playoffs (Steelers) 31–28; Lost AFC Second-Round Playoffs (Dolphins) 34–13	Dan Fouts (OPOY, PB MVP)	Don Coryell
1983	1983	NFL	AFC	West	5th	6	10	0			Don Coryell
1984	1984	NFL	AFC	West	5th	7	9	0			Don Coryell
1985	1985	NFL	AFC	West	3rd	8	8	0			Don Coryell
1986	1986	NFL	AFC	West	5th	4	12	0		Leslie O'Neal (DROY)	Don Coryell (1–7); Al Saunders (3–5)
1987^{[H]}	1987	NFL	AFC	West	3rd	8	7	0			Al Saunders
1988	1988	NFL	AFC	West	4th	6	10	0			Al Saunders
1989	1989	NFL	AFC	West	5th	6	10	0			Dan Henning
1990	1990	NFL	AFC	West	4th	6	10	0			Bobby Ross
1991	1991	NFL	AFC	West	5th	4	12	0			Bobby Ross
1992	1992	NFL	AFC	West	1st	11	5	0	Won AFC Wild Card Playoffs (Chiefs) 17–0; Lost AFC Divisional Playoffs (Dolphins) 31–0		Bobby Ross
1993	1993	NFL	AFC	West	4th	8	8	0			Bobby Ross
1994	1994	NFL	AFC	West	1st	11	5	0	Won AFC Divisional Playoffs (Dolphins) 22–21; Won AFC Championship (Steelers) 17–13; Lost Super Bowl XXIX (49ers) 49–26		Bobby Ross
1995	1995	NFL	AFC	West	2nd	9	7	0	Lost AFC Wild Card Playoffs (Colts) 35–20		Bobby Ross
1996	1996	NFL	AFC	West	3rd	8	8	0			Bobby Ross
1997	1997	NFL	AFC	West	5th	4	12	0			Kevin Gilbride
1998	1998	NFL	AFC	West	5th	5	11	0			Kevin Gilbride (2–4); June Jones (3–7)
1999	1999	NFL	AFC	West	4th	8	8	0			Mike Riley
2000	2000	NFL	AFC	West	5th	1	15	0			Mike Riley
2001	2001	NFL	AFC	West	5th	5	11	0			Mike Riley
2002	2002	NFL	AFC	West	3rd	8	8	0			Marty Schottenheimer
2003	2003	NFL	AFC	West	4th	4	12	0			Marty Schottenheimer
2004	2004	NFL	AFC	West	1st	12	4	0	Lost AFC Wild Card Playoffs (Jets) 20–17 (OT)	Marty Schottenheimer (COY); Drew Brees (CBPOY)	Marty Schottenheimer
2005	2005	NFL	AFC	West	3rd	9	7	0		Shawne Merriman (DROY)	Marty Schottenheimer
2006	2006	NFL	AFC	West	1st	14	2	0	Lost AFC Divisional Playoffs (Patriots) 24–21	LaDainian Tomlinson (MVP, OPOY)	Marty Schottenheimer
2007	2007	NFL	AFC	West	1st	11	5	0	Won AFC Wild Card Playoffs (Titans) 17–6; Won AFC Divisional Playoffs (Colts) 28–24; Lost AFC Championship (Patriots) 21–12		Norv Turner
2008	2008	NFL	AFC	West	1st	8	8	0	Won AFC Wild Card Playoffs (Colts) 23–17 (OT); Lost AFC Divisional Playoffs (Steelers) 35–24		Norv Turner
2009	2009	NFL	AFC	West	1st	13	3	0	Lost AFC Divisional Playoffs (Jets) 17–14		Norv Turner
2010	2010	NFL	AFC	West	2nd	9	7	0			Norv Turner
2011	2011	NFL	AFC	West	2nd	8	8	0			Norv Turner
2012	2012	NFL	AFC	West	2nd	7	9	0			Norv Turner
2013	2013	NFL	AFC	West	3rd	9	7	0	Won AFC Wild Card Playoffs (Bengals) 27–10; Lost AFC Divisional Playoffs (Broncos) 24–17	Philip Rivers (CBPOY)	Mike McCoy
2014	2014	NFL	AFC	West	3rd	9	7	0			Mike McCoy
2015	2015	NFL	AFC	West	4th	4	12	0			Mike McCoy
2016	2016	NFL	AFC	West	4th	5	11	0			Mike McCoy
Total						416	421	5	(1961–2016, Regular season only)		
Total						11	16	0	(1961–2016, Post-season games only)		
Total						427	437	5	(1961–2016, Total for all games; 1 AFL Championship, 3 NFL Titles)		

==== Footnotes ====
- ^{A} As a result of the AFL–NFL merger, the league was broken into two conferences; the AFL teams moved into the American Football Conference.
- ^{B} This season included the Holy Roller game.
- ^{C} The Chargers finished ahead of Oakland in the AFC West based on better net points in division games.
- ^{D} The Chargers finished ahead of the Denver Broncos based on better divisional record.
- ^{E} This game is known as The Epic in Miami.
- ^{F} This game was known as the Freezer Bowl.
- ^{G} The 1982 season was shortened by a strike, so the league was divided up into two conferences instead of its normal divisional alignment.
- ^{H} The strike of 1987 reduced the regular season schedule from 16 to 15 games.

=== Retired numbers ===
San Diego Chargers retired numbers
No.	Player	Position	Tenure
14	Dan Fouts	QB	1973–1987
19	Lance Alworth	WR	1962–1970
21	LaDainian Tomlinson	RB	2001–2009
55	Junior Seau	LB	1990–2002

=== Chargers members of the Pro Football Hall of Fame ===
San Diego Chargers in Pro Football Hall of Fame
No.	Player	Position	Tenure	Inducted
19	Lance Alworth	WR	1962–1970	1978
74	Ron Mix*	OT	1960–1969	1979
19	Johnny Unitas	QB	1973	1979
75	Deacon Jones	DE	1972–1973	1980
—	Sid Gillman*	Head coach	1960–1971	1983
89	John Mackey	TE	1972	1992
14	Dan Fouts	QB	1973–1987	1993
72	Larry Little	OG	1967–1968	1993
80	Kellen Winslow	TE	1979–1987	1995
18	Charlie Joiner	WR	1976–1986	1996
71	Fred Dean	DE	1975–1981	2008
55	Junior Seau	LB	1990–2002	2015
91	Leslie O'Neal	OLB/DE	1986-1995	2014
21	LaDainian Tomlinson	RB	2001-2009	2017
—	Bobby Beathard	General manager	1990-2000	2018
—	Don Coryell	Head coach	1978–1986	2023
85	Antonio Gates	TE	2003–2016	2025
9	Drew Brees	QB	2001–2005	2026

(*) Indicates Player or Coach began his tenure in Los Angeles

=== Chargers Hall of Fame ===
The Chargers Hall of Fame was founded in 1976. Eligible candidates must have been retired for at least four seasons. Selections for admission to the Hall of Fame are made by a five-member committee chaired by Spanos. The Chargers in 2012 allowed fans to vote for the newest member.

=== 50th Anniversary Team ===
in 2009, the Chargers announced their 50th Anniversary Team. It honored the top players and coaches in the team's history. The team included 53 players and coaches selected from 103 nominees. Online voting accounted for fifty percent (400,000 votes) of the results. The remainder were from members of the Chargers Hall of Fame and five members of the local media. Dan Fouts and LaDainian Tomlinson were the most popular players. The resulting team included seven members of the Pro Football Hall of Fame and eleven players from the 2009 Chargers' team.

=== San Diego Hall of Champions ===
The San Diego Hall of Champions includes Lance Alworth, Ron Mix, John Hadl, Charlie Joiner, Don Coryell, Sid Gillman, Gary Garrison, Dan Fouts, Ed White, Kellen Winslow, Earl Faison, Rolf Benirschke, Keith Lincoln, Russ Washington, Stan Humphries, Ernie Ladd, and Doug Wilkerson. The Hall of Champions admits athletes from the San Diego area as well as those who have played for San Diego–based professional and collegiate teams.

== Franchise records ==
=== Passing ===
	Regular season			Playoffs			Rookie	
Statistic	Career	Season	Game	Career	Season	Game	Season	Game
Passes Completed	3,811; Philip Rivers	437; Philip Rivers; 2015	38; Philip Rivers; 10/25/15 OAK	164; Philip Rivers	63; Stan Humphries; 1994	33; Dan Fouts; 1/2/82 @MIA	118; Craig Whelihan; 1997	25; Ryan Leaf; 10/25/98 SEA
Pass Attempts	5,917; Philip Rivers	661; Philip Rivers; 2015	58; Mark Herrmann; 12/22/85 @KAN; Philip Rivers; 10/25/15 OAK	286; Dan Fouts	114; Stan Humphries; 1994	53; Dan Fouts; 1/2/82 @MIA	260; John Hadl; 1962	52; Ryan Leaf; 10/25/98 SEA
Passing Yds	45,833; Philip Rivers	4,802; Dan Fouts; 1981	503; Philip Rivers; 10/18/15 @GB	2,165; Philip Rivers	767; Philip Rivers; 2007	433; Dan Fouts; 1/2/82 @MIA	1,632; John Hadl; 1962	350; Billy Joe Tolliver; 12/10/89 @WAS
Passing TD	314; Philip Rivers	34; Philip Rivers; 2008	6 Dan Fouts; 11/22/81 @OAK	12; Dan Fouts	4 Dan Fouts; 1980, 1981, 1982; Stan Humphries; 1994; Philip Rivers; 2007	3 Dan Fouts; 1/2/82 @MIA; 1/9/83 @PIT; Philip Rivers; 1/13/08 @IND; 1/11/09 @PIT	15; John Hadl; 1962	3 John Hadl; 9/30/62 @OAK; 11/25/62 @HOU
Passer Rating	94.7+ Philip Rivers	105.5; Philip Rivers; 2013	158.3*; Dan Fouts; 9/26/76 STL	85.2# Philip Rivers	145.3*; Tobin Rote; 1963	145.3*; Tobin Rote; 1/5/64 BOS	58.3# Craig Whelihan; 1997	122.9*; Rick Neuheisel; 10/11/87 @TAM
Passes Intercepted	242; Dan Fouts	26; John Hadl; 1972	5 Dan Fouts; 9/14/80 @OAK	16; Dan Fouts	5 Dan Fouts; 1979, 1982; Stan Humphries; 1994	5 Dan Fouts; 1/16/83 @MIA	24; John Hadl; 1962	5 John Hadl; 12/16/62 @DTX; Marty Domres; 11/09/69 @KAN
Sacked	361; Philip Rivers	49; Philip Rivers; 2012	7 Stan Humphries; 09/14/97 CAR; Philip Rivers; 10/17/10 @STL; 12/28/14 @KAN	20; Philip Rivers	8 Philip Rivers; 2008	4 Philip Rivers; 1/11/09 @MIA; 1/12/14 @DEN	22; Ryan Leaf	6 Rick Neuheisel; 10/18/87 @RAI; Ryan Leaf; 10/18/98 PHI
Yds/Pass Att	7.75+ Philip Rivers	8.75# Philip Rivers; 2009	15.8*; Dan Fouts; 11/3/74 CLE	7.96# Philip Rivers	11.53*; Tobin Rote; 1963	13.9*; Philip Rivers; 1/13/08 @IND	6.6# Jesse Freitas; 1974	11.8*; Marty Domres; 11/23/69 DEN
Pass Yds/Game	253.22+ Philip Rivers	320.33; Dan Fouts; 1982	-	303.57# Dan Fouts	333*; Dan Fouts; 1979	-	219.4; Billy Joe Tolliver; 1989	-

∗ = minimum 15 attempts, # = min. 100 attempts, + = min. 500 attempts

=== Rushing ===
	Regular season			Playoffs			Rookie	
Statistic	Career	Season	Game	Career	Season	Game	Season	Game
Rushing Att	2,880; LaDainian Tomlinson	372; LaDainian Tomlinson; 2002	39; LaDainian Tomlinson; 10/20/02 @OAK; Marion Butts; 12/17/89 @KAN	110; Chuck Muncie	57; Natrone Means; 1994	26; LaDainian Tomlinson; 1/8/05 NYJ	339; LaDainian Tomlinson; 2001	39; Marion Butts; 12/17/89 @KAN
Rushing Yds	12,490; LaDainian Tomlinson	1,815; LaDainian Tomlinson; 2006	243; LaDainian Tomlinson; 12/28/03 OAK	516; Chuck Muncie	241; Natrone Means; 1994	206; Keith Lincoln; 1/5/64 @BOS	1,236; LaDainian Tomlinson; 2001	189; Brad Hubbert; 12/24/67 NYJ
Rushing TD	138; LaDainian Tomlinson	28; LaDainian Tomlinson; 2006	4 LaDainian Tomlinson; 10/14/07 OAK; 11/12/06 @CIN; Chuck Muncie; 11/29/81 DEN; Clarence Williams; 9/16/79 BUF	4 LaDainian Tomlinson	2 Natrone Means; 1994; LaDainian Tomlinson; 2006; Darren Sproles; 2008	2 LaDainian Tomlinson; 1/14/07 NWE; Darren Sproles; 1/3/09 IND	10; Tim Spencer; 1985; LaDainian Tomlinson; 2001	3 Natrone Means; 12/27/93 MIA; LaDainian Tomlinson; 9/30/01 CIN; Ryan Mathews; 1/2/11 @DEN
Yds/Rushing Att	4.9+ Paul Lowe	6.45# Keith Lincoln; 1963	12.6*; Brad Hubbert; 12/24/67 NYJ	12.0*; Keith Lincoln	7.86*; Paul Lowe; 1960	7.93*; Marion Butts; 1/2/93 KAN	6.29# Paul Lowe; 1960	12.6*; Brad Hubbert; 12/24/67 NYJ
Rushing Yds/Game	88.6+ LaDainian Tomlinson	113.4# LaDainian Tomlinson; 2006	-	86.0*; Chuck Muncie	165*; Paul Lowe; 1960	-	96.8# Don Woods; 1974	-

∗ = minimum 15 attempts, # = min. 100 attempts, + = min. 500 attempts

=== Receiving ===
	Regular season			Playoffs			Rookie	
Statistic	Career	Season	Game	Career	Season	Game	Season	Game
Receptions	897; Antonio Gates	102; Keenan Allen; 2017	15; Kellen Winslow; 10/7/84 @GNB; Keenan Allen; 9/13/15 DET	42; Antonio Gates	18; Vincent Jackson; 2007	13; Kellen Winslow; 1/2/82 @MIA	71; Keenan Allen; 2013	13; LaDainian Tomlinson; 11/25/01 ARI
Receiving Yds	11,192; Antonio Gates	1602; Lance Alworth; 1965	260; Wes Chandler; 12/20/82 CIN	539; Charlie Joiner	300; Vincent Jackson; 2007	166; Kellen Winslow; 1/2/82 @MIA	1,046; Keenan Allen; 2013	155; John Jefferson; 12/4/78 CHI
Receiving TD	111; Antonio Gates	14; Lance Alworth; 1965; Tony Martin; 1996	5 Kellen Winslow; 11/22/81 @OAK	4 Charlie Joiner; Kellen Winslow	3 Charlie Joiner; 1980	2 Charlie Joiner; 1/11/81 OAK; James Brooks; 1/2/82 @MIA; Kellen Winslow; 1/9/83 @PIT; Keenan Allen; 1/12/14 @DEN	13; John Jefferson; 1978	2 (8 players)
Yds/Reception	19.44+ Lance Alworth	28.6# Bobby Duckworth; 1984	46.25*; Lance Alworth; 11/26/64 BUF	17.97# Charlie Joiner	31.5*; Ron Smith; 1980	23.67*; Keenan Allen; 1/12/14 @DEN	18.62# Jerry Robinson; 1962	35.5*; Harrison Davis; 11/3/74 CLE
Receiving Yds/Game	86.3+ Lance Alworth	129# Wes Chandler; 1982	-	86.75# Wes Chandler	133*; Ronnie Harmon; 1995	-	71.5; John Jefferson; 1978	-

∗ = minimum 4 receptions, # = min. 20 receptions, + = min. 200 receptions

=== Special teams, defense, other ===
	Regular season			Playoffs		
Statistic	Career	Season	Game	Career	Season	Game
Rushing/Receiving TD	153; LaDainian Tomlinson	31; LaDainian Tomlinson; 2006	5 Kellen Winslow; 11/22/81 @OAK	4 Charlie Joiner; Darren Sproles; LaDainian Tomlinson; Kellen Winslow	3 Charlie Joiner; 1980; Darren Sproles; 2008	2 (9 players)
Yds From Scrimmage	16,445; LaDainian Tomlinson	2,370; LaDainian Tomlinson; 2003	271; LaDainian Tomlinson; 12/1/02 DEN	644; Chuck Muncie	329; Keith Lincoln; 1963	329; Keith Lincoln; 1/5/64 BOS
Returning
Kick returns	258; Darren Sproles	67; Ronney Jenkins; 2000	8 Andre Coleman; 10/27/96 @SEA; Ronney Jenkins; 10/1/00 @STL; 12/3/00 SFO; Darren Sproles; 10/26/08 @NOR	21; Darren Sproles	13; Andre Coleman; 1994	8 Andre Coleman; 1/29/95 N SFO
Kick Return Yds	6,469; Darren Sproles	1,541; Ronney Jenkins; 2001	250; Ronney Jenkins; 11/18/01 @OAK	537; Darren Sproles	350; Andre Coleman; 1994	244; Andre Coleman; 1/29/95 N SFO
Kick Return TD	4 Andre Coleman	2 Andre Coleman; 1994, 1995; Ronney Jenkins; 2001	1 (8 games)	1 Andre Coleman	1 Andre Coleman; 1994	1 Andre Coleman; 1/29/95 N SFO
Yds/Kick Return	27.56*; Richard Goodman	27.95*; Speedy Duncan; 1969	46.67+ Darren Sproles; 12/30/07 @OAK	41.8# Speedy Duncan	30.0# Darren Sproles; 2008	49.0+ Speedy Duncan; 12/26/64 @BUF
Punt returns	212; Mike Fuller	46; Mike Fuller; 1979	8 Mike Fuller; 9/19/76 @TAM; Phil McConkey; 11/26/89 @IND; Latario Rachal; 10/11/98 @OAK; Leon Johnson; 12/7/03 @DET	12; Darren Sproles	6 Darrien Gordon; 1994	5 Eric Parker; 1/14/07 NWE
Punt return Yds	2,388; Mike Fuller	537; Darrien Gordon; 1996	168; Eric Metcalf; 11/2/97 @CIN	107; Darren Sproles	76; Darren Sproles; 2008	72; Darren Sproles; 1/3/09 IND
Punt return TD	3 Eric Metcalf; Darrien Gordon	3 Eric Metcalf; 1997	2 Eric Metcalf; 11/2/97 @CIN	1 Wes Chandler	1 Wes Chandler; 1981	1 Wes Chandler; 1/2/82 @MIA
Yds/Punt Return	13.7*; Keith Lincoln	21.43# Keith Lincoln; 1961	42.0+ Eric Metcalf; 11/2/97 @CIN	12.38# Mike Fuller	15.2# Darren Sproles; 2008	24.0+ Darren Sproles; 1/3/09 IND
Kick & Punt Return Yds	7,404; Darren Sproles	1,737; Andre Coleman; 1995	282; Speedy Duncan; 11/24/68 NYJ	644; Darren Sproles	364; Andre Coleman; 1994	244; Andre Coleman; 1/29/95 N SFO
All-Purpose Yds	16,445; LaDainian Tomlinson	2,535; Lionel James; 1985	345; Lionel James; 11/10/85 RAI	1,059; Darren Sproles	602; Darren Sproles; 2008	329; Keith Lincoln; 1/5/64 BOS
Kicking
	Regular season			Playoffs		
Statistic	Career	Season	Game	Career	Season	Game
Extra Pts	349; Nate Kaeding	58; Nate Kaeding; 2006	6 (6 games)	18; Nate Kaeding	6 George Blair; 1963; Rolf Benirschke; 1981; Nate Kaeding; 2007	6 George Blair; 1/5/64 BOS
Field Goals	261; John Carney	34; Nick Novak; 2013	6 Greg Davis; 10/5/97 @OAK; John Carney; 9/5/93 SEA; 9/19/93 HOU	8 Nate Kaeding	5 Nate Kaeding; 2007	4 Nate Kaeding; 1/20/08 @NWE
Punts	771; Darren Bennett	95; Darren Bennett; 1998	11 (5 games)	52; Mike Scifres	13; John Kidd; 1992	7 John Kidd; 1/10/93 @MIA; Mike Scifres; 1/14/07 NWE
Punt Yds	34,152; Mike Scifres	4,248; Darren Bennett; 2000	522; Darren Bennett; 10/11/98 @OAK	2,330; Mike Scifres	599; Mike Scifres; 2008	324; John Kidd; 1/10/93 @MIA
Defensive Records
	Regular season			Playoffs		
Statistic	Career	Season	Game	Career	Season	Game
Interceptions	42; Gill Byrd	10; Antonio Cromartie; 2007	3 (11 games)	3 Glen Edwards; Drayton Florence	2 (6 seasons)	
Interception return yards	546; Gill Byrd	349; Charlie McNeil; 1961	177; Charlie McNeil; 9/24/61 HOU	62; Glen Edwards	45; Bud Whitehead; 1961	
Interception return TDs	5 Dick Harris; Kenny Graham	3 Dick Harris; 1961	1 (108 games)	0		
Sacks (since 1982)	105.5; Leslie O'Neal	17; Leslie O'Neal; 1992; Shawne Merriman; 2006	5 Leslie O'Neal; 11/16/86 DAL	4 Gary Johnson	2.5; Fred Dean; 1980; Leroy Jones; 1980; Burt Grossman; 1992	2.5; Burt Grossman; 1/2/93 KAN

∗ = minimum 20; # = min. 5; + = min. 3

=== Exceptional performances ===
Statistic	Career	Season	Playoff Games	Rookie Games
Games with 300+ passing yards	51; Dan Fouts; Philip Rivers	8 Dan Fouts; 1980; Philip Rivers; 2015	5 Dan Fouts	2 Billy Joe Tolliver
Games with 100+ rushing yards	46; LaDainian Tomlinson	10; LaDainian Tomlinson; 2006	2 Chuck Muncie	7 Don Woods
Games with 100+ receiving yards	41; Lance Alworth	9 Lance Alworth; 1965	2 Wes Chandler; Vincent Jackson; Charlie Joiner; Kellen Winslow	5 Keenan Allen
Games with 1+ TD scored	93; LaDainian Tomlinson	14; LaDainian Tomlinson; 2004	3 Vincent Jackson; Charlie Joiner; Chuck Muncie; Darren Sproles; LaDainian Tomlinson; Kellen Winslow	9 Paul Lowe; 1960
Games with 2+ TD scored	42; LaDainian Tomlinson	10; LaDainian Tomlinson; 2006	1 (7 players)	5 John Jefferson
Games with 3+ TD scored	13; LaDainian Tomlinson	6 LaDainian Tomlinson; 2006	-	1 Ryan Mathews; Natrone Means; Dickie Post; LaDainian Tomlinson

=== Other career records ===
Games Played	204 (Antonio Gates)
Long pass	99 (Tony Martin from Stan Humphries, 9/18/94 @SEA)
Long rush	87 (Paul Lowe, 9/10/61 @DTX)
Long punt return	95 (Speedy Duncan, 11/24/68 NYJ)
Long kickoff return	105 (Richard Goodman, 1/1/12 @OAK)
Long interception return	103 (Vencie Glenn, 11/29/87 DEN)
Long field goal return	109 (Antonio Cromartie, 11/4/07 @MIN)
Long FG	59 (Michael Badgley, 12/9/18 CIN)
Seasons with 4000+ pass yards	8 (Philip Rivers)
Seasons with 1000+ rush yards	8 (LaDainian Tomlinson)
Seasons with 1000+ receiving yards	7 (Lance Alworth)

=== Team records ===
Most points scored	58, 12/22/63 DEN
Most points allowed	57, 10/1/00 @STL
Largest margin of victory	46, 11/2/63 @NYJ
Largest margin of defeat	43, 12/13/64 KAN
Most yards allowed	614, 10/1/00 @STL
Fewest yards allowed	58, 10/22/61 @OAK
Shutouts	17

== See also ==
- History of the National Football League in Los Angeles
- History of the Los Angeles Chargers
