= Bob Young (offensive lineman) =

American football player and strongman (1942–1995)

No. 77, 60, 56, 64, 63, 65
- Positions: Guard, Defensive end, Defensive tackle

Personal information
- Born: September 3, 1942; Marshall, Texas, U.S.
- Died: June 17, 1995 (aged 52); Missouri City, Texas, U.S.
- Listed height: 6 ft 1 in (1.85 m)
- Listed weight: 270 lb (122 kg)

Career information
- High school: Brownwood (Brownwood, Texas)
- College: Texas (1960); Texas State (1961); Howard Payne (1962-1963)
- NFL draft: 1964: 19th round, 261st overall pick

Career history

Playing
- Denver Broncos (1966–1970); Houston Oilers (1971); St. Louis Cardinals (1972–1979); Houston Oilers (1980); New Orleans Saints (1981)

Coaching
- Houston Gamblers (1984-1985) Offensive line coach; Houston Oilers (1990–1994) Offensive line coach

Awards and highlights
- First-team All-Pro (1979); 2× Pro Bowl (1978, 1979)

Career NFL/AFL statistics
- Games played: 194
- Games started: 149
- Fumble recoveries: 7
- Stats at Pro Football Reference

Robert Allen Young (September 3, 1942 – June 17, 1995) was an American professional football player who was an offensive guard for 16 seasons in the American Football League (AFL) and National Football League (NFL). He played college football for the Howard Payne Yellow Jackets.

== Early life ==
Young was born September 3, 1942, in Marshall, Texas, to Richard and Laverne Young. He spent his childhood in Brownwood, Texas where he set the state (class 4A) shot put record in 1960.

== College career ==
Young started his college career at Texas where he was named the Southwest Conferences outstanding freshman lineman, but in 1961 he transferred to Howard Payne University to be closer to home. At HPU he competed in both football and track, where he threw the shot put. In 1986, he was inducted into the HPU Sports Hall of Fame.

== Professional career ==
He started his career with the Denver Broncos, playing five seasons.

In his first eight seasons of the league, he did not take focus on his health. In the summer of 1974, this would change when he walked into a gym and liked what he saw in terms of fitness. By the time he walked into training camp that season, he had gained 50 pounds that shocked his coaches. It soon spread to having other Cardinal offensive linemen work on their physique with modern weightlifting/powerlifting that eventually became a league obsession. That season, the offensive line quintet of tackles Roger Finnie & Dan Dierdorf, center Tom Banks, and guards in Conrad Dobler and Young allowed just eight sacks in the entire fourteen-game season (the next time the Cardinals had three games with no sacks taken would not come until 2024).

Young was named to two Pro Bowls (1978 & 1979) and was a first-team All-Pro selection in 1979 as well. A hit he suffered in the Pro Bowl in 1979 would soon hasten the end of his career, as St. Louis cut him at the end of the 1979 season. Years later, Young admitted to his wife that he never felt any better than when he was on steroids. Young freely admitted to his use of steroids in his playing career, stating that he used it lightly in college before eventually using them for eight seasons when his brother convinced him about steroids being safe in moderation, which he would use in his later days in St. Louis and in Houston. He played just two games in 1981 for the Saints and retired.

In 1986, he was inducted into the Howard Payne University Sports Hall of Fame for his playing career in football along with track and field.

== Power lifting ==
He was the older brother of three-time world powerlifting champion Doug Young.

Young competed in the inaugural World's Strongest Man contest in 1977, finishing second to weightlifter Bruce Wilhelm. He also finished 5th in the 1979 World's Strongest Man.

== Coaching career ==
After his pro career, Young coached in the USFL from 1982 to 1986 as an offensive line coach for the Houston Gamblers. He coached the offensive line at University of Houston from 1987 to 1989, and for the Houston Oilers from 1990 to 1995.

== Death ==
Young was married three times. After his career ended, he maintained a smoking habit and was considered obese to go along with having diabetes. On June 17, 1995, Young died of a heart attack at age 52.

== See also ==
- List of American Football League players
