= 1979 New Orleans Saints season =

NFL team season

- Head coach: Dick Nolan
- Home stadium: Louisiana Superdome

Results
- Record: 8–8
- Division place: 2nd NFC West
- Playoffs: Did not qualify
- Pro Bowlers: 5: TE Henry Childs; QB Archie Manning; RB Chuck Muncie; WR Wes Chandler; FS Tom Myers

The 1979 New Orleans Saints season was the team's thirteenth season in the National Football League. The Saints finished the season at 8–8, the franchise's first non-losing season. After starting 0–3, New Orleans won seven of its next 10 and was tied for first place with the Los Angeles Rams in the NFC West with three weeks to play, but the season unraveled in a Monday Night Football contest at home vs. the Oakland Raiders, when the Saints squandered a 35–14 lead and lost, 42–35. The Raiders returned to the Superdome a little over a year later and won Super Bowl XV.

The Saints were eliminated from playoff contention in week 15 when they were blown out 35–0 at home by the San Diego Chargers, but defeated the NFC West champion Los Angeles Rams in the regular season finale in what was the Rams' last game in the Los Angeles Memorial Coliseum until 2016. While the Rams went on to represent the NFC in Super Bowl XIV, the Saints ended their season with a record of 8-8, the first time in the history of the franchise that the team finished with a non-losing record. Not counting the 1976 expansion Seattle Seahawks, New Orleans was one of three franchises which failed to make the playoffs in the 1970s, joined by the Giants and the Jets (the other 1976 expansion team, the Tampa Bay Buccaneers, won the NFC Central Division in 1979).

Following the season, running back Chuck Muncie was named Most Valuable Player of the ensuing Pro Bowl.

== Offseason ==
=== NFL draft ===
1979 New Orleans Saints draft
Round	Pick	Player	Position	College	Notes
1	11	Russell Erxleben	Punter	Texas	
2	38	Reggie Mathis	Linebacker	Oklahoma	
4	93	Jim Kovach	Linebacker	Kentucky	
5	120	Harlan Huckleby	Linebacker	Michigan	
6	146	Ricky Ray	Cornerback	Norfolk State	
7	176	Stan Sytsma	Linebacker	Minnesota	
8	202	Doug Panfil	Guard	Tulsa	
11	285	David Hall	Wide receiver	Missouri-Rolla	
12	311	Kelsey Finch	Running back	Tennessee	
Made roster

=== Undrafted free agents ===
1979 undrafted free agents of note
Player	Position	College
Otis Drew	Tight end	Southern
Tom Rozantz	Quarterback	William & Mary

== Personnel ==
=== Staff ===
1979 New Orleans Saints staff
Front office: President – John W. Mecom Jr.; Executive Vice President – Eddie Jones; Vice President of Player Personnel – Harry Hulmes; Head coaches: Head Coach – Dick Nolan; Offensive coaches: Offensive Coordinator – Ed Hughes; Quarterbacks/Receivers – Lamar McHan; Offensive Line – Dick Stanfel	Defensive coaches: Defensive Coordinator – Paul Wiggin; Defensive Line – Tom Pratt; Linebackers – Ed Beard; Defensive Backs – Chet Franklin; Special teams coaches: Special Teams – Whitey Campbell; Strength and conditioning: Conditioning – Bob Hill

=== Roster ===
1979 New Orleans Saints roster
Quarterbacks (QB): 11 Ed Burns; 8 Archie Manning; 12 Bobby Scott; Running backs (RB): 45 Jack Holmes; 42 Chuck Muncie; 33 Mike Strachan; 30 Wayne Wilson; Wide receivers (WR): 89 Wes Chandler; 82 Ike Harris; 84 Rich Mauti; 83 Tinker Owens; Tight ends (TE): 85 Henry Childs; 87 Larry Hardy; 88 Brooks Williams	Offensive linemen (OL): 66 Conrad Dobler G; 61 Roger Finnie T; 62 John Hill C; 64 Dave Lafary G/T; 76 Jim Pietrzak C; 68 Fred Sturt G; 71 J. T. Taylor T; 65 Robert Woods T; 79 Emanuel Zanders G; Defensive linemen (DL): 63 Barry Bennett DT; 72 Mike Fultz DT; 78 Elois Grooms DE; 74 Derland Moore DT; 75 Elex Price DT; 60 Don Reese DE	Linebackers (LB): 50 Ken Bordelon OLB; 58 Joe Federspiel MLB; 54 Pat Hughes OLB; 52 Jim Kovach MLB; 56 Reggie Mathis OLB; 57 Jim Merlo OLB; Defensive backs (DB): 27 Ray Brown SS; 26 Clarence Chapman CB; 20 Eric Felton CB; 21 David Gray CB; 49 Ralph McGill FS; 37 Tom Myers FS; 22 Ricky Ray CB; 48 Don Schwartz SS; Special teams (ST): 17 Rick Partridge P; 1 Garo Yepremian K	Reserve: 73 Joe Campbell DE (IR); 14 Russell Erxleben P (IR); 34 Tony Galbreath RB (IR); 77 Doug Panfl G (IR); 53 Stan Sytsma LB (IR); Rookies in italics

== Regular season ==
=== Schedule ===
Week	Date	Opponent	Result	Record	Venue	Attendance
1	September 2	**Atlanta Falcons**	**L** 34–40	0–1	Louisiana Superdome	70,940
2	September 9	at Green Bay Packers	**L** 19–28	0–2	Milwaukee County Stadium	53,184
3	September 16	Philadelphia Eagles	**L** 14–26	0–3	Louisiana Superdome	54,212
4	September 23	at **San Francisco 49ers**	**W** 30–21	1–3	Candlestick Park	39,727
5	September 30	New York Giants	**W** 24–14	2–3	Louisiana Superdome	51,543
6	October 7	**Los Angeles Rams**	**L** 17–35	2–4	Louisiana Superdome	68,986
7	October 14	at Tampa Bay Buccaneers	**W** 42–14	3–4	Tampa Stadium	67,640
8	October 21	Detroit Lions	**W** 17–7	4-4	Louisiana Superdome	57,428
9	October 28	at Washington Redskins	**W** 14–10	5–4	RFK Stadium	52,133
10	November 4	at Denver Broncos	**L** 3–10	5–5	Mile High Stadium	74,482
11	November 11	**San Francisco 49ers**	**W** 31–20	6–5	Louisiana Superdome	65,551
12	November 18	at Seattle Seahawks	**L** 24–38	6–6	Kingdome	60,055
13	November 25	at **Atlanta Falcons**	**W** 37–6	7–6	Atlanta–Fulton County Stadium	42,815
14	December 3	Oakland Raiders	**L** 35–42	7–7	Louisiana Superdome	65,541
15	December 9	San Diego Chargers	**L** 0–35	7–8	Louisiana Superdome	61,059
16	December 16	at **Los Angeles Rams**	**W** 29–14	8–8	Los Angeles Memorial Coliseum	53,879
Note: Intra-division opponents are in **bold** text.

=== Standings ===
NFC West
	W	L	T	PCT	DIV	CONF	PF	PA	STK
Los Angeles Rams^{(3)}	9	7	0	.563	5–1	7–5	323	309	L1
New Orleans Saints	8	8	0	.500	4–2	8–4	370	360	W1
Atlanta Falcons	6	10	0	.375	2–4	5–7	300	388	W1
San Francisco 49ers	2	14	0	.125	1–5	2–10	308	416	L1

=== Season summary ===
Week Four: New Orleans Saints (0–3) at San Francisco 49ers (0–3)

Quarter	1	2	3	4	Total
**Saints**	0	13	14	3	**30**
49ers	7	7	0	7	**21**

at Candlestick Park, San Francisco, California

- Date: September 23
- Game time: 4:00 p.m.
- Game weather: 79 °F (26 °C)
- Game attendance: 39,727
- Pro-Football-Reference.com

Game information

First quarter

- SF – Freddie Solomon 17-yard pass from Steve DeBerg (Ray Wersching kick). 49ers 7–0.

Second quarter

- NO – Tony Galbreath 1-yard run (kick failed). 49ers 7–6.
- NO – Wes Chandler 5-yard pass from Archie Manning (Garo Yepremian kick). Saints 13–7.
- SF – Freddie Solomon 25-yard pass from Steve DeBerg (Ray Wersching kick). 49ers 14–13.

Third quarter

- NO – Larry Hardy 3-yard pass from Archie Manning (Garo Yepremian kick). Saints 20–14.
- NO – Tony Galbreath 1-yard run (Garo Yepremian kick). Saints 27–14.

Fourth quarter

- SF – Paul Hofer 2-yard run (Ray Wersching kick). Saints 27–21.
- NO – Garo Yepremian 18-yard field goal. Saints 30–21.

Top passers

- NO – Archie Manning – 20/28, 355 yards, 2 TD
- SF – Steve DeBerg – 18/33, 263 yards, 2 TD, 3 INT

Top rushers

- NO – Chuck Muncie – 18 rushes, 98 yards
- SF – O. J. Simpson – 7 rushes, 25 yards
  Wilbur Jackson – 6 rushes, 25 yards

Top receivers

- NO – Wes Chandler – 4 receptions, 127 yards, TD
- SF – Freddie Solomon – 8 receptions, 144 yards, 2 TD

==== Week 14 ====
Week Fourteen: Oakland Raiders (7–6) at New Orleans Saints (7–6)

Quarter	1	2	3	4	Total
**Raiders**	7	7	7	21	**42**
Saints	0	28	7	0	**35**

at Louisiana Superdome, New Orleans, Louisiana

- Date: December 3, 1979
- Game time: 8:00 p.m.
- Game weather: Indoors (dome)
- Game attendance: 71,323
- TV announcers (ABC): Frank Gifford, Don Meredith, and Howard Cosell
- Pro-Football-Reference.com

Game information

**First quarter**

- OAK – Raymond Chester 3-yard pass from Ken Stabler (Jim Breech kick). – Raiders 7–0. **Drive: 15 plays, 78 yards.**

**Second quarter**

- NO – Tony Galbreath 2-yard run (Garo Yepremian kick). – Tie 7–7. **Drive: 13 plays, 89 yards.**
- NO – Tony Galbreath 17-yard pass from Archie Manning (Garo Yepremian kick). – Saints 14–7. **Drive: 3 plays, 19 yards.**
- NO – Chuck Muncie 1-yard run (Garo Yepremian kick). – Saints 21–7. **Drive: 8 plays, 68 yards.**
- NO – Henry Childs 28-yard pass from Archie Manning (Garo Yepremian kick). – Saints 28–7. **Drive: 1 play, 28 yards.**
- OAK – Arthur Whittington 1-yard run (Jim Breech kick). – Saints 28–14. Drive:

**Third quarter**

- NO – Ken Bordelon 19-yard interception return (Garo Yepremian kick), 6:24. – Saints 35–14.
- OAK – Mark van Eeghen 1-yard run (Jim Breech kick). – Saints 35–21. Drive:

**Fourth quarter**

- OAK – Derrick Ramsey 17-yard pass from Ken Stabler (Jim Breech kick). – Saints 35–28. Drive:
- OAK – Cliff Branch 66-yard pass from Ken Stabler (Jim Breech kick). – Tie 35–35. Drive:
- OAK – Cliff Branch 8-yard pass from Ken Stabler (Jim Breech kick), 1:54. – Raiders 42–35. **Drive: 3 plays, 13 yards.**

Top passers

- OAK – Ken Stabler – 26/44, 295 yards, 4 TD, 2 INT
- NO – Archie Manning – 12/23, 154 yards, 2 TD, INT

Top rushers

- OAK – Arthur Whittington – 14 rushes, 67 yards, TD
- NO – Chuck Muncie – 21 rushes, 128 yards, TD

Top receivers

- OAK – Cliff Branch – 7 receptions, 126 yards, 2 TD
- NO – Tony Galbreath – 7 receptions, 106 yards, TD

== Awards and records ==
- Chuck Muncie, Pro Bowl Most Valuable Player
