= Tom Banks (American football) =

American football player (born 1948)

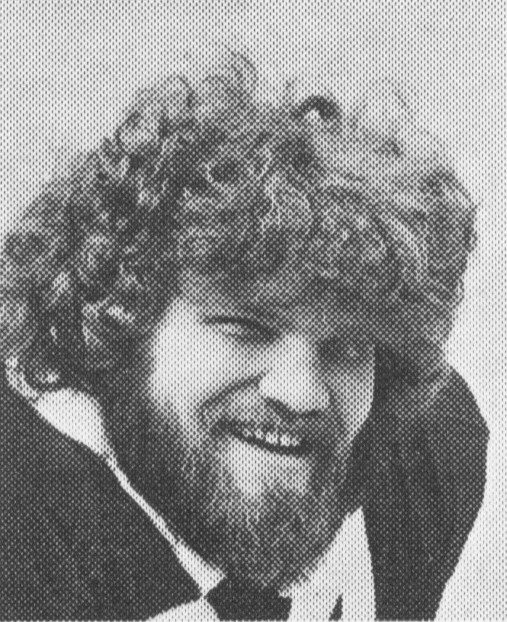
- Tom Banks in 1976

No. 54
- Position: Center

Personal information
- Born: August 20, 1948 (age 78); Birmingham, Alabama, U.S.
- Listed height: 6 ft 1 in (1.85 m)
- Listed weight: 245 lb (111 kg)

Career information
- High school: John Carroll Catholic (Birmingham)
- College: Auburn
- NFL draft: 1970: 8th round, 189th overall pick

Career history
- St. Louis Cardinals (1971–1980); Birmingham Stallions (1983–1984)

Awards and highlights
- First-team All-Pro (1976); Second-team All-Pro (1977); 4× Pro Bowl (1975–1978); Third-team All-American (1969); 2× First-team All-SEC (1968, 1969)

Career NFL statistics
- Games played: 116
- Games started: 110
- Fumble recoveries: 6
- Stats at Pro Football Reference

Thomas Sidney Banks Jr. (born August 20, 1948) is an American former professional football player who was a center for 10 seasons in the National Football League (NFL) with the St. Louis Cardinals in the National Football Conference (NFC). He also played two seasons in the United States Football League with the Birmingham Stallions. From 1975 to 1977 he was a member of an offensive line known as the "Great Wall of St. Louis", along with Dan Dierdorf, Conrad Dobler, Roger Finnie, and Bob Young, which gave up only eight sacks in 1975, the second fewest in NFL history for a season of 14 games or more. Banks was selected to play in the Pro Bowl four consecutive seasons, was twice an All-Pro, and was selected multiple times All-NFC. He was an All-Southeastern Conference center at Auburn University, a third-team Associated Press All-American, and was named to the Senior Bowl's 50th Anniversary team.

== Early life ==
Banks was born on August 20, 1948, in Birmingham, Alabama. His father Tom Banks played football at Auburn University. Banks attended John Carroll Catholic High School in Birmingham, where his father was the athletic director. His father had been John Carroll's head football coach during Banks's childhood. From a young age, Banks' father had Banks doing exercises to build up his physical fitness, including neck muscles. Banks played center on John Carroll's varsity football team for three years.

As a senior in 1965, Banks weighed 205 lb (93 kg), playing center and middle guard on defense. He later described himself as being 6 ft 2 in (1.88 m) and 205 lb as a high school senior. In his senior year, Banks was an alternate at center on The Birmingham News 1965 Class 4–A All-State football team. Banks was a high school All-American as a senior. He also played tackle, guard, and fullback during his years at John Caroll. In 1966, Banks also played on John Carroll's basketball team.

== College career ==
Banks played college football for the Auburn Tigers. Because his father had played football at Auburn, Banks knew that is where he wanted to attend college as well. When University of Alabama football coach Bear Bryant sought to recruit Banks, Banks told Bryant it would be a waste of Bryant's time. Auburn played in the Southeastern Conference (SEC) during Banks' time playing in varsity football (1967 to 1969). Banks was reportedly 6 ft 2 in (1.88 m) and 205 lb as a freshman center at Auburn (though he was reported as 6 ft 1 in (1.85 m) years later as an NFL player).

As a sophomore, he was the reserve center behind senior Forrest Blue, a future NFL All-Pro center. Banks started the season's final two games when Blue was injured. The Associated Press (AP) named Banks to its SEC All-Sophomore team in 1967. Banks was selected to United Press International's (UPI) All-SEC team at center in 1968. The AP named him honorable mention All-SEC at center in 1968. In 1969, the AP selected Banks first-team All-SEC at center. The AP named Banks a third-team All-American in 1969. He was also an Auburn team co-captain that year.

Banks played in the January 10, 1970 Senior Bowl. He had to play guard during the Senior Bowl when Alabama Crimson Tide guard Alvin Samples suffered a head injury. Banks played "outstanding football" for the South team at guard in the game. In 1998, he was named as an offensive lineman on the Senior Bowl's 50th Anniversary team, and in 2023, made it to the 75th Anniversary team. Banks' father had played in the first Senior Bowl. They were the first father and son to play in the Senior Bowl.

== Professional career ==
=== St. Louis Cardinals ===
Banks was selected by the St. Louis Cardinals in the eighth round of the 1970 NFL draft, 189th overall. Banks credited Auburn's offensive line coach George Atkins with preparing him to play in the NFL. He played for the Cardinals from 1971 through 1980 From 1973 to 1979, Banks played under Cardinals offensive line coach Jim Hanifan, who became his head coach in 1980. Banks considered Hanifan the best of all his coaches.

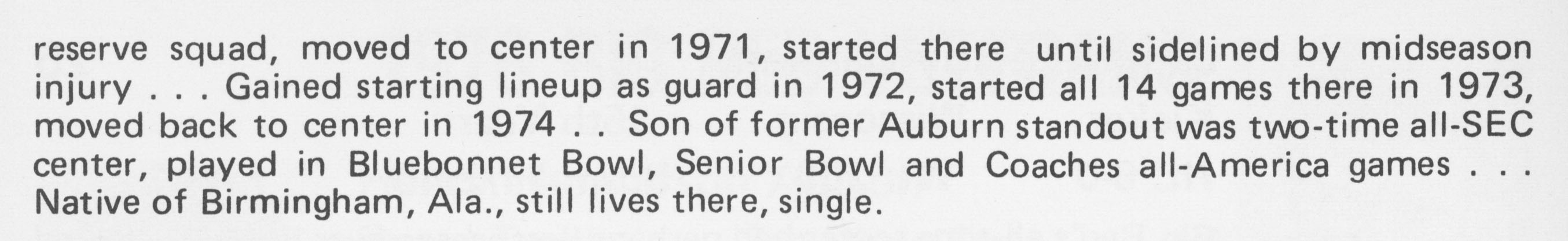
An excerpt on Tom Banks playing for the St. Louis Cardinals from 1970–74

Banks sat out the 1970 season due to a knee injury. In 1971, Banks started seven games at center, 11 in 1972, and all 14 games in 1973. Banks missed all but one game of the 1974 season after sustaining a knee injury in the season opener that required major reconstructive surgery, after being hit by Bill Bergey of the Philadelphia Eagles.

==== Great Wall of St. Louis (1975 to 1978) ====
From 1975 to 1978, under offensive line coach Jim Hanifan, the Cardinals led the NFL twice in fewest quarterback sacks allowed and were the second and third best in the other two seasons. Banks started all 14 games at center each season from 1975 to 1977, and 15 of 16 games in 1978.

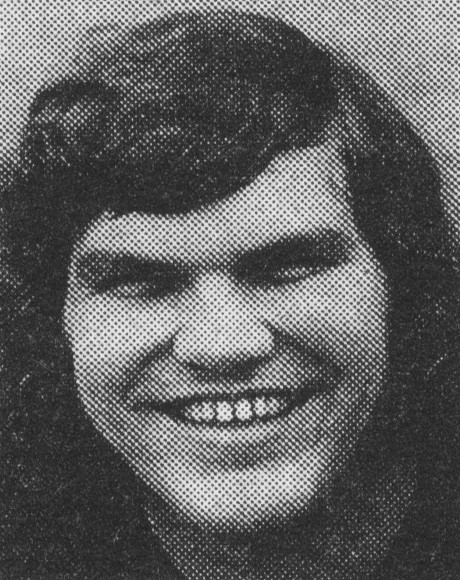
Tom Banks in 1975, no. 54, St. Louis Cardinals

After missing nearly the entire 1974 season, Banks returned in 1975 and played all 14 games as the Cardinals' starting center. He was named to the Pro Bowl for the first time in his career. Pro Football Weekly also named him first-team All-NFC. His offensive linemates included Conrad Dobler and Dan Dierdorf at right guard and right tackle, respectively; Bob Young and Roger Finnie at left guard and left tackle; and Jackie Smith at tight end. Both Dierdorf and Dobler were also selected to the Pro Bowl that season. The offensive line of Banks, Dierdorf, Dobler, Young, and Finnie was known as the "Great Wall of St. Louis". During his 1996 Pro Football Hall of Fame induction speech, Dierdorf said "'We were one of the greatest offensive lines that ever walked on the field'". Others have called this offensive line one of the best of the 1970s or in NFL history.

The 1975 Cardinals were the sixth best in the NFL in both rushing and passing yards, and Cardinals' fullback Jim Otis led the NFC in rushing and was fourth best in the NFL, with 1,076 yards. The Cardinals' offensive line only allowed eight total quarterback sacks in 14 games, leading all NFL teams that season; the next fewest being the Buffalo Bills at 22 sacks allowed. The eight sacks also tied a league record. One of those sacks was not against a quarterback, but Cardinals' kicker Jim Bakken on a fake field goal attempt. In a season of 14 or more games, only the 1975 Cardinals offensive line and 1970 San Francisco 49ers offensive line (centered by Banks's former Auburn teammate Forrest Blue and known as "the Protectors") gave up eight sacks in an entire NFL season. Their record was broken in 1988, and eight sacks remains the second lowest sack total allowed for a season of at least 14 games.

In 1976, the Cardinals again led the entire NFL in fewest sacks allowed (17). Banks started all 14 games at center, and was named first-team All-Pro by the Associated Press and second team All-Pro by the Newspaper Enterprise Association (NEA) and Pro Football Writers of America. Pro Football Weekly, The Sporting News, and UPI named him first-team All-NFC. He was selected to play in the Pro Bowl for a second straight season.

In 1977, the Cardinals gave up the second fewest sacks in the NFL (15), one behind the league-leading New England Patriots. Banks, Dobler, Finnie, and Young started all 14 games, and Dierdorf started 11 games. Banks was selected to the Pro Bowl for a third straight season, named second-team All-Pro by the AP and NEA, and selected first-team All-NFC by Pro Football Weekly, The Sporting News and UPI.

In 1978, the Cardinals gave up the third fewest sacks in the NFL (22). Banks was selected to the Pro Bowl for the fourth and final time, and was named first-team All-NFC by UPI, The Sporting News, and Pro Football Weekly.

==== Final Cardinals' years ====
Banks started 14 games in 1979 (in a 16-game season), and only six in 1980. By 1979, the Cardinals fell to 15th in the NFL in fewest sacks, totaling 39 sacks allowed. Banks was still named first-team All-NFC by UPI and The Sporting News. Only Young remained along with Banks as starters in most of the Cardinals games that season from the 1975 to 1977 lines, Dierdorf having suffered a serious knee injury that year.

In 1980, Banks was a team co-captain. He was also active in the National Football League Players Association (NFLPA), and according to a Herald & Review press report, he was "an outspoken critic of Cardinals management". He had been the team's NFLPA representative since at least 1975. As early as February 1978, Banks had criticized Cardinals owner Bill Bidwill and team operations director Joe Sullivan over the manner in which the Cardinals operated, including, among other things, what were perceived to be substandard salaries. Speaking of the situation in early 1978, an angry Banks stated, "If Joe Sullivan is such a great wheeler-dealer, the best thing he could do for the team and for St. Louis is trade Billy Bidwill".

The Cardinals made Tom Brahaney their full-time starting center before the 1980 season. They moved Banks to guard on the offensive line, where he started six games. Banks suffered a knee injury during the season. He had missed four games when he was released by the Cardinals in late November 1980. Giving an update on Banks' contract, Cardinals coach Jim Hanifan said at the time, "Tom Banks no longer fits into our football program . . . I have reached this decision in the best interest of the club".

Banks, who was highly regarded by his teammates, reportedly had become overtly angry and disheartened with Hanifan and the team before Hanifan decided to release Banks. Even after releasing Banks, Hanifan amicably stated, "I still love the kid". Over 30 years later, Banks still called Hanifan the best coach he had ever had. Over time, Banks maintained a good relationship with Hanifan, and he realized that Hanifan was only doing his job when he released Banks in 1980. Banks also stated that he could have handled the situation better at the time. Banks attributed the Cardinals' overall offensive success in 1975 to how Hanifan assembled and coached the offensive line.

Within days of being released, the Washington Redskins signed Banks. Washington released him just two days later. While preparing himself to find another team for which he could play in 1981, the knee pain he experienced while working out led him instead to announce his retirement from the NFL before the 1981 season.

Over his Cardinals' career, Banks was a four-time Pro Bowl selection, twice an All-Pro, and multi-time All-NFC player with the Cardinals. He played a total of 116 NFL games with the Cardinals, starting 110 of those games.

=== United States Football League ===
Banks played with the Birmingham Stallions of the United States Football League (USFL) in 1983 and 1984, and served as a coach on the team in 1985. He was the first player the Stallions signed. Banks was enthusiastic about the opportunity to play in his hometown of Birmingham, where his family could watch him play, and where he could end his career in a positive fashion after leaving the Cardinals in difficult circumstances in 1980. Banks started every Stallions' game at center in both 18-game regular seasons, and two playoff games in 1984. He was second-team All-USFL in 1983, and was selected team captain in 1984. He retired after the 1984 season, and took on the job of offensive line coach for the 1985 season.

== Honors ==
In 1998, Banks was named to the 50th Anniversary Senior Bowl All-Time Team, having played in the 1970 edition of the game. In 2000, he was inducted to the Alabama Sports Hall of Fame. In 2014, he was inducted into the Missouri Sports Hall of Fame.

== Personal life ==
After his football career, Banks worked as a bartender in Birmingham. Banks had his right hip replaced multiple times, and his left knee has been replaced. Banks suffered a wide variety of injuries throughout his body while playing at center, in addition to those leading to his knee and hip replacements. Early in his career, he suffered from headaches, which ended when he switched to a new type of heavier helmet (the "Gladiator") which was water packed and weighed considerably more than the standard helmet. While other players refused to wear the bulkier protective equipment, Banks used all of the extra padding he could as it was developed over the years. Banks became president of the South Alabama chapter of the NFL Retired Players Association, and in this role, he made retired players aware of their health benefits and informed them about health issues they might face. In describing the attitude of football players during his playing days, which included playing with injuries, Banks said "'I did what I wanted to do and I would do it all again. I loved playing football . . . Back then, and I would think it's still true now, it was a badge of honor not to leave a game. That's just what you did'".
