= Ronney Jenkins =

American gridiron football player (born 1977)

No. 28
- Position: Running back / Kickoff returner

Personal information
- Born: May 25, 1977 (age 49); Los Angeles, California, U.S.

Career information
- College: BYU (1996–1998), Northern Arizona (1999)
- NFL draft: 2000: undrafted

Career history
- San Diego Chargers (2000–2002); Oakland Raiders (2003); New Orleans Saints (2004)*; Calgary Stampeders (2004–2005)
- * Offseason or practice squad member only

Awards and highlights
- NFL kickoff return yards leader (2001); WAC Freshman of the Year (1996); Second-team All-WAC (1998); Second-team All-Big Sky (1999)

Career NFL statistics
- Returns: 190
- Return yards: 4,550
- Touchdowns: 3
- Stats at Pro Football Reference

Ronney Jenkins (born May 25, 1977) is an American former professional football player who was a running back and kickoff returner for four seasons with the San Diego Chargers of the National Football League (NFL). He played college football for the BYU Cougars and Northern Arizona Lumberjacks.

== Early life ==
Jenkins had an outstanding prep career while playing for Hueneme High School in Oxnard, California, and he garnered much national attention during his senior season. On November 9, 1995, he set the national record for most yards rushing in a single game during a 52–34 victory over Rio Mesa High School. Jenkins carried the ball 30 times for 619 yards and 7 touchdowns. The previous record of 608 yards had been set by John Bunch in Arkansas in 1974. Jenkins' total shattered the California state record of 507 yards, set by David Dotson of Valley View High School in 1991. The national record stood until 2006, when Paul McCoy of Matewan High School rushed for 658 yards in a single game.

== College career ==
Jenkins was heavily recruited by many schools across the country, but chose to play at Brigham Young University because they had shown interest in him long before his record-breaking single-game performance. His freshman season with the Cougars (1996) was impressive: he rushed for 733 yards and scored a team-high 14 touchdowns (including 11 rushing TDs) despite being a backup to Brian McKenzie the entire season. He also led the Cougars in kickoff returning; for his efforts, he was named WAC Freshman of the Year. With help from Jenkins, BYU beat Kansas State University in the Cotton Bowl Classic and finished the year with a 14–1 record, becoming the first team in the history of Division I-A football to win 14 games in a season.

In the off-season, BYU suspended Jenkins for violating the school's honor code. He was forced to sit out the entire 1997 season, but returned as BYU's full-time starter at tailback in 1998. He was the Cougars' top offensive weapon that season, rushing for 1,307 yards (at the time, the second-highest total in school history). He also totaled 15 touchdowns, which tied for the second-highest total in school history. He was named to the 1998 All-WAC 2nd Team. In a 46–43 victory over San Jose State, Jenkins rushed for 250 yards (the second-highest total in BYU history) and scored 5 touchdowns, which tied a school record.

In 1999, Jenkins was again disciplined by BYU for violating the honor code. Because it was a second offense, he was expelled from the school. He transferred to Northern Arizona University. He played one season for the Lumberjacks, but made a big impact while he was there. He rushed for 1,051 yards and 7 touchdowns, and added 67 receptions for 716 yards and 10 touchdowns. For his efforts, he was named to the All-Big Sky 2nd Team.

== Professional career ==
Jenkins entered the NFL in 2000 as a rookie free agent. He joined the San Diego Chargers and almost immediately became the team's top kickoff returner. In his rookie season, he set franchise records for most kickoff returns (67) and most kickoff return yards (1,531), eclipsing totals set by Andre Coleman in 1995. He returned a kickoff 93 yards for a touchdown against the New Orleans Saints in Week 2, and was named AFC Special Teams Player of the Week.

In 2001, he was even better. He averaged 26.6 yards per kickoff return, leading the entire NFL in that category. He totaled 1,541 yards in kickoff returns, which broke the team record he had set in 2000. In a game against the Oakland Raiders, he totaled 250 yards in kickoff returns, which set another team record. In the game, he had a 93-yard kickoff return for a touchdown and added a 67-yard return to start the second half. Jenkins also had an 88-yard touchdown return against the Denver Broncos, and added a 72-yard return against the Buffalo Bills. He was named AFC Special Teams Player of the Month for October 2001, and was chosen as an alternate for the AFC's Pro Bowl team.

Jenkins was limited by injuries in 2002, but still managed to return 40 kickoffs for 925 yards (an average of 23.1 yards per return). In just three seasons, Jenkins had become the Chargers' all-time leader in kickoff return yards with 3,997. In 2003, Jenkins signed a free agent contract with the Raiders. In the 2003 season, he was again limited by injuries (a severe ankle sprain). He played in just seven games, returning 25 kickoffs for 553 yards. When the Raiders needed to clear space on their roster for the addition of veteran quarterback Rob Johnson, they decided to waive Jenkins.

Jenkins spent the 2004 off-season with the Saints, but was waived by the team before the regular season began. In September 2004, he signed with the Calgary Stampeders of the Canadian Football League. He saw limited action in his first season in the CFL; in five games, he rushed 11 times for 50 yards and caught 4 passes for 30 yards. He did not see much action in his second season, either: he rushed 11 times for 84 yards and added 3 receptions for 13 yards. The Stampeders released Jenkins in September 2005. The following year, he joined the Calgary Gators of the Alberta Football League
