= Henry Childs =

American football player (1951–2016)

No. 88, 85, 83, 89
- Position: Tight end

Personal information
- Born: April 16, 1951; Thomasville, Georgia, U.S.
- Died: June 3, 2016 (aged 65); Thomasville, Georgia, U.S.
- Listed height: 6 ft 2 in (1.88 m)
- Listed weight: 223 lb (101 kg)

Career information
- College: Kansas State
- NFL draft: 1974: 5th round, 109th overall pick

Career history
- Atlanta Falcons (1974); New Orleans Saints (1974-1980); Los Angeles Rams (1981); Green Bay Packers (1984)

Awards and highlights
- New Orleans Saints Hall of Fame; Pro Bowl (1979)

Career NFL statistics
- Receptions: 223
- Receiving yards: 3,401
- Receiving TDs: 28
- Stats at Pro Football Reference

Henry Childs (April 16, 1951 – June 3, 2016) was an American professional football player who was a tight end in the National Football League (NFL) for the Atlanta Falcons, New Orleans Saints, Los Angeles Rams, and the Green Bay Packers. He was a Pro Bowl player in 1979.

Childs was inducted into the New Orleans Saints Hall of Fame in 1994.

On June 3, 2016, he had a massive heart attack while driving in his car and was pronounced dead at the age of 65 in Thomasville, Georgia. He was one of at least 345 NFL players to be diagnosed after death with chronic traumatic encephalopathy (CTE), which is caused by repeated hits to the head.

== NFL career statistics ==
Legend
**Bold**	Career high

Year	Team	Games		Receiving				
Year	Team	GP	GS	Rec	Yds	Avg	Lng	TD
1974	ATL	6	0	0	0	0.0	0	0
1974	NOR	1	0	0	0	0.0	0	0
1975	NOR	14	4	10	179	**17.9**	38	0
1976	NOR	14	11	26	349	13.4	46	3
1977	NOR	13	10	33	518	15.7	**59**	**9**
1978	NOR	**16**	**16**	**53**	**869**	16.4	52	4
1979	NOR	**16**	**16**	51	846	16.6	51	5
1980	NOR	13	7	34	463	13.6	30	6
1981	RAM	7	7	12	145	12.1	39	1
1984	GNB	3	2	4	32	8.0	17	0
		103	73	223	3,401	15.3	59	28
