= Roger Finnie =

American football player (born 1945)

No. 61, 60
- Positions: Offensive tackle, Defensive tackle

Personal information
- Born: November 6, 1945; Miami, Florida, U.S.
- Died: August 6, 2012 (aged 66)
- Listed height: 6 ft 3 in (1.91 m)
- Listed weight: 245 lb (111 kg)

Career information
- High school: Miami Senior
- College: Florida A&M (1965-1968)
- NFL draft: 1969: 14th round, 364th overall pick

Career history
- Bridgeport Jets (1969); New York Jets (1969-1972); St. Louis Cardinals (1973–1978); New Orleans Saints (1979)

Career NFL/AFL statistics
- Games played: 121
- Games started: 83
- Fumble recoveries: 4
- Sacks: 1
- Stats at Pro Football Reference

Roger Lewis Finnie (November 6, 1945 – August 6, 2012) was an American professional football offensive tackle and defensive tackle who played eleven seasons in the National Football League (NFL). Finnie played college football for Florida A&M University.

Finnie was an All-City team member at Miami Northwestern Senior High School and a key factor in Northwestern's state championship in 1964. At Florida A&M, Finnie garnered All-Southern Intercollegiate Athletic Conference and All-American honors.

Finnie was selected by the New York Jets in the 14th round of the 1969 NFL/AFL draft. He began his NFL career as a defensive tackle and also played offensive guard and tight end with the Jets. He was traded to the St. Louis Cardinals in 1973 where he was converted to a full-time offensive tackle. Finnie played left tackle on a record-breaking offensive line that included Pro Football Hall of Fame member Dan Dierdorf, Conrad Dobler, Tom Banks, and Bob Young. That unit led the NFL with the fewest sacks allowed for three years (and the National Football Conference for five years) in the mid-1970s. In 1975, the group set an NFL record, allowing only eight sacks in 14 games. The Cardinals traded Finnie to the New Orleans Saints in 1979 where he was reunited with former teammate Dobler. He retired in 1980.

After retirement, Finnie resided in Miami and served as a Coordinator for the Summer Youth Employment and Training Program, also working as a Senior and Youth Counselor. He also coordinated the city football league for boys ages 15 and under and was commissioner of the Miami city basketball team. He was inducted into the FAMU Hall of Fame in 1990.

Finnie died in 2012 at the age of 66.
