= Andre Coleman =

American football player and coach (born 1969)

Washington Commanders
- Title: Assistant wide receivers coach, Returners coach

Personal information
- Born: September 19, 1972 (age 54); Hermitage, Pennsylvania, U.S.
- Listed height: 5 ft 9 in (1.75 m)
- Listed weight: 165 lb (75 kg)

Career information
- Positions: Wide receiver, Return specialist
- High school: Hickory (Hermitage)
- College: Kansas State (1990–1993)
- NFL draft: 1994: 3rd round, 70th overall pick

Career history

Playing
- San Diego Chargers (1994–1996); Seattle Seahawks (1997); Pittsburgh Steelers (1997–1998)

Coaching
- Youngstown State Penguins (2010–2012); Tight ends coach (2010); Wide receivers coach (2011–2012); Kansas State Wildcats (2013–2018); Wide receivers coach (2013–2015); Pass game coordinator & wide receivers coach (2016–2017); Offensive coordinator & wide receivers coach (2018); Texas Longhorns (2019–2021); Offensive analyst (2019); Interim wide receivers coach (2019); Wide receivers coach (2020–2021); Washington Commanders (2024–present); Offensive assistant (2024–2025); Assistant wide receivers/returners coach (2026–present)

Awards and highlights
- Third-team All-American (1993); First-team All-Big Eight (1993)

Career NFL statistics
- Receptions: 43
- Receiving yards: 602
- Return yards: 4,850
- Total touchdowns: 8
- Stats at Pro Football Reference

Andre Clintonian Coleman (born September 19, 1972) is an American professional football coach and former wide receiver who is the assistant wide receivers and returners coach for the Washington Commanders of the National Football League (NFL). He played college football for the Kansas State Wildcats was drafted by the San Diego Chargers in the third round of the 1994 NFL draft, later playing for the Pittsburgh Steelers and Seattle Seahawks.

== Career ==
Pre-draft measurables
Height	Weight	Arm length	Hand span	40-yard dash	10-yard split	20-yard split
5 ft 8 3/4 in (1.75 m)	165 lb (75 kg)	30 in (0.76 m)	8 5/8 in (0.22 m)	4.41 s	1.53 s	2.55 s

Coleman's primary role during his career was as a kick returner, gaining 4,466 yards and scoring two touchdowns. He also added 384 yards and a touchdown returning punts, and caught 43 passes for 602 yards and three touchdowns. As a rookie in 1994, Coleman played in Super Bowl XXIX with the Chargers and set several Super Bowl records in the game: most kickoff returns (8), most kickoff return yards (244), and most total return yards (244, tied with Desmond Howard in Super Bowl XXXI). Coleman had a 98-yard kickoff return for a touchdown in the game, tied for the second longest kickoff return in Super Bowl history.

Coleman began his coaching career at Youngstown State in 2010, spending his first season as the tight ends coach and the following two seasons as their wide receivers coach. He left to coach wide receivers at his alma mater of Kansas State in 2013. Coleman added pass game coordinator to his duties in the 2016 season, and was later promoted to offensive coordinator in 2018.

Coleman joined the Texas Longhorns in 2019 as an offensive analyst. He was promoted to interim wide receivers coach on December 1, 2019, and officially named wide receivers coach on January 13, 2020. He was fired after the 2021 season. After two years away from coaching, Coleman was hired by the Washington Commanders as an offensive assistant in 2024. He was promoted to assistant wide receivers and returners coach in February 2026.
