= John Frederick Sytsma =

- Born: 22 July 1921; Paterson, New Jersey, United States
- Died: 29 May 2007 (aged 85)
- Occupations: Railroad engineer, union official
- Known for: International President of the Brotherhood of Locomotive Engineers (1976–1986)

John Frederick Sytsma (22 July 1921 – 29 May 2007) was President of the Brotherhood of Locomotive Engineers (BLE) from 1976 to 1986.

== Early years ==
John Frederick Sytsma was born on 22 July 1921 in Paterson, New Jersey. At the age of 19 he obtained work as a fireman with the New York, Susquehanna and Western Railway (NYS&W). Sytsma married Phyllis June Stingle in 1942. During World War II (1939–1945) he served in an Army Railway Operating Battalion and ran engines in the Philippines and Korea. He was promoted to Engineer in 1946, and ran every class of engine for the railroad. For a period he worked for the American Surety Company of New York. He studied at the New York Insurance Institute and the State College of Paterson, New Jersey, where he studied business administration and business law.

== Union career ==
In 1954 Sytsma joined the Brotherhood of Locomotive Engineers in Hawthorne, New Jersey. In 1955 he was elected General Chairman for the NYS&W engineers. In 1956 he moved to Cleveland, Ohio, and began working full-time for the BLE as Administrative Assistant to the President of the BLE. He was elected General Secretary-Treasurer of the BLE in 1962, holding this position until 1974. He was First Vice President of the union between 1974 and 1976. At that time Burrell N. Whitmire was president of the union.

Sytsma was elected President of the BLE in 1976, and was reelected in 1981. As president he initiated programs to fight abuse of drugs and alcohol by railway workers, while resisting random checks of employees using breathalyzers and sniffer dogs. He also worked for improvements in wages, safety standards and working conditions. In September 1981 President Ronald Reagan imposed a three-month cooling-off period and three-year no-strike agreement to end a railway worker's dispute. This was agreed by most of the unions. Sytsma held out for a guarantee that locomotive engineers would retain their 15% salary differential over other train crew members. In 1982 Sytsma was named a member of the National Labor Advisory Council of the Republican National Committee. In May 1986 Sytsma was involved in negotiations with Amtrak over a dispute that could have led to a strike affecting hundreds of thousands of commuters on the east coast of the US.

In February 1985 the union held a referendum on recalling Sytsma due to allegations of abuse of office. It was narrowly defeated. Sytsma ran for a third term as president of the 26,000-member union in August 1986. He did not win reelection, and was replaced by Robert E. Delaney.

== Later years ==
Sytsma and his wife moved to Salt Lake City after his retirement from the union in 1986. He worked with the Salt Lake County Fire Department for many years as a volunteer photographer, until losing his sight due to macular degeneration. His wife, Phyllis, died on 10 January 2004 at the age of 81. Sytsma died of natural causes on 29 May 2007. He was aged 84.

== Bibliography ==
- Sytsma, John F. (1973). Ahrens-Fox Album.
- Sytsma, John F. (1974). Ahrens-Fox Factory Registration Numbers of Motorized Fire Apparatus - 1912-1957. Brotherhood of Locomotive Engineers.
- Sytsma, John F. (1977). 100 Favorite Fire Rigs. Sytsma.
- Sytsma, John F. (1982). Fire Rigs Fighting Fires. J.F. Sytsma.
