= Stan Sytsma =

American football player (born 1956)

No. 61
- Position: Linebacker

Personal information
- Born: May 3, 1956 (age 70); Glendale, Arizona, U.S.
- Listed height: 6 ft 2 in (1.88 m)
- Listed weight: 220 lb (100 kg)

Career information
- High school: Hutchinson
- College: Minnesota
- NFL draft: 1979: 7th round, 176th overall pick

Career history
- New Orleans Saints (1979); Atlanta Falcons (1980)
- Stats at Pro Football Reference

Stanley Allan Sytsma (born May 3, 1956) is an American former professional football player who was a linebacker for the Atlanta Falcons of the National Football League (NFL). He played college football for the Minnesota Golden Gophers.
