= Conrad Dobler =

American football player (1950–2023)

- Dobler in 1979

No. 60, 66, 69
- Position: Guard

Personal information
- Born: October 1, 1950; Chicago, Illinois, U.S.
- Died: February 13, 2023 (aged 72); Pueblo, Colorado, U.S.
- Listed height: 6 ft 3 in (1.91 m)
- Listed weight: 254 lb (115 kg)

Career information
- High school: Twentynine Palms (CA)
- College: Wyoming
- NFL draft: 1972: 5th round, 110th overall pick

Career history
- St. Louis Cardinals (1972–1977); New Orleans Saints (1978–1979); Buffalo Bills (1980–1981)

Awards and highlights
- Second-team All-Pro (1976); 3× Pro Bowl (1975–1977)

Career NFL statistics
- Games played: 129
- Starts: 125
- Fumble recoveries: 9
- Touchdowns: 1
- Stats at Pro Football Reference

Conrad Francis Dobler (Pronounced: DOH-blur) (October 1, 1950 – February 13, 2023) was an American professional football guard who played in the National Football League (NFL) for 10 seasons, primarily with the St. Louis Cardinals. He was selected in the fifth round of the 1972 NFL draft by the Cardinals, where he spent his first six seasons, and was later a member of the New Orleans Saints and Buffalo Bills for two seasons each.

A three-time Pro Bowl selection during his Cardinals tenure, Dobler achieved notoriety for frequently utilizing unsportsmanlike tactics against opponents, which he openly acknowledged. He was proclaimed "Pro Football's Dirtiest Player" with a 1977 cover story in Sports Illustrated magazine and was the author of a 1988 memoir, They Call Me Dirty.

== College career ==
Dobler received collegiate offers from Arizona, Arizona State, Cal-Berkeley, and Utah, and selected the University of Wyoming on an athletic scholarship, playing offensive guard and defensive tackle for the Cowboys. His primary strength and usage was as a defensive tackle and he was named the team's Most Valuable Player on defense and an All-Western Athletic Conference selection as a senior in 1971.

An excellent student who majored in political science, Dobler received a Bachelor of Arts degree from the University of Wyoming in 1972.

== Professional career ==
=== St. Louis Cardinals ===
Dobler was selected in the fifth round of the 1972 NFL draft by the St. Louis Cardinals, who made him the 110th overall pick. Although predominantly a defensive lineman in college, Dobler arrived at Cardinals training camp to discover the team had drafted him as a prospective offensive guard at the pro level. He attempted to win a place on the team demonstrating technique but instead found himself being cut from the squad and heading home for Wyoming just ahead of the 1972 season. Two weeks into the season, injuries struck the Cardinals' line and the team contacted Dobler and brought him back to St. Louis as a roster player.

"On the return trip, I made the best decision of my career," Dobler later recalled. "I decided to return to my own style of football. In college I was a fighter, a scrapper — I didn't try to finesse anyone, I just tried to beat their heads in. When I got to St. Louis the first time, I changed that.... I was trying to be nice, I didn't want to make any enemies. Well, that trip home told me a lot. I was out of a job and the other SOBs were working. If I got the chance to try again, I wasn't going to give anyone a break except Conrad Dobler.

Making use of every dirty trick in the book to win battles on the line, by midseason Dobler found himself a starting guard for the Cardinals' next to Hall of Fame right tackle Dan Dierdorf. Dobler quickly gained a reputation among opponents for his tactics — which gained mainstream notoriety in 1975 when Minnesota Vikings defensive tackle Doug Sutherland went public over the teeth marks and ankle bruises suffered lining up over Dobler. "What you need when you play Dobler is a string of garlic beads and a wooden stake," Sutherland declared.

Several weeks later, when the Cardinals were on Monday Night Football, former Detroit Lions defensive tackle turned analyst Alex Karras proclaimed Dobler "the dirtiest player in the league" during the pregame, with ABC's multiple cameras capturing Dobler committing various acts of unsportsmanlike viciousness throughout the night. Reporters began to make Dobler a weekly interview subject and opponents began to come forward with stories of their own. The legend of Dobler grew.

Dobler leaned into his role as a villain of the trenches, declaring: "Get one thing straight right now — it's the game of football that's dirty, not me. Professional football is not a nice game. It's not played by nice people." He added: "Football is fighting, but with pads on. It's a controlled type of violence. You can't kill anyone and that's about the limit they put on it."

He made the cover of Sports Illustrated, which heralded Dobler as "Pro Football's Dirtiest Player" with a lengthy story in 1977.

Despite Dobler's embrace of thuggish tactics, the Cardinals had solid offensive lines throughout his tenure, especially for pass blocking. The team allowed just eight sacks during the entire 1975 campaign, an unofficial record. Dobler was an important cog of this success, making three consecutive Pro Bowl appearances from 1975 to 1977.

=== New Orleans Saints ===
On January 31, 1978, the Cardinals traded Dobler along with wideout Ike Harris to the New Orleans Saints for defensive end Bob Pollard and guard Terry Stieve. Dobler would remain with the club for two seasons.

Whereas the Cardinals had soft-sold Dobler as "the youngest — and most notorious — member of the Big Red offensive line," albeit one who "prefers to describe his efforts as robust," the Saints were happy to paint in shades of black, describing Dobler as "Attilla the Hun in football gear" in their 1979 team media guide.

Dobler only made three starts for the Saints in 1978 before suffering a season-ending knee injury. He was placed on the injured reserve list on September 20 and remained there for the duration of the 1978 campaign. He was able to make it all the way back in 1979, however, starting in all 16 games for the Saints at right guard.

=== Buffalo Bills ===
Hampered by injury and believing his skills to be in decline, on July 2, 1980, the Saints traded the 29-year old Dobler to the Buffalo Bills for an 8th round pick in the 1981 NFL draft. Dobler was originally acquired to fill-in a reserve to All-Pro guard Joe DeLamielleure. The Buffalo veteran refused to report to training camp and demanded a trade, however, opening up a path to a starting spot for Dobler.

In a roster-juggling move related to league injured reserve rules and the 45-man roster limit with respect to another player, the Bills waived Dobler on September 1, only to resign him to a new contract as a free agent the following day.

Dobler saw humor in the chance to perform his last act playing for head coach Chuck Knox in Buffalo, telling a reporter from Newsday, "I'm from Wyoming and who was the last great cowboy from Wyoming? Buffalo Bill, that's who. So it's only fitting that I finish my career in Buffalo." Dobler indicated that although slowed by injury and rehabilitation in New Orleans, he had returned refreshed and rejuvenated playing on a new line with a new team. "I guess nobody thought I'd make it back," he said. "But I'm back. I'm at full power, and I've found the fountain of youth here in Buffalo."

He started all 16 games for the Bills at right guard in 1980 and 13 games with 14 appearances in 1981.

Dobler retired at the end of the 1981 season at the age of 31.

== After football ==
In the 1980s, Dobler, known for such transgressions as punching Joe Greene, spitting on a downed and injured Bill Bergey, and kicking Merlin Olsen in the head, parodied his image in a Miller Lite beer commercial by getting a section of fans to argue about why they drank the beer. Olsen gained a measure of symbolic revenge by placing Dobler's name on a headstone in a scene from Olsen's TV series Father Murphy. NFL Films placed Dobler's conflicts with Bergey as #9 on the NFL Top 10 list of feuds.

Dobler paid a high price for his NFL career, suffering through numerous operations to repair his battered body, including multiple knee surgeries. Still in need of further surgical procedures, Dobler, like many other disabled pro football veterans, was unable to gain disability assistance from the NFL.

On April 5, 2007, The Buffalo News reported that as a result of falling out of a hammock in 2001, Dobler's wife Joy became a paraplegic. Substantial medical bills for Joy's care put the Dobler family in such financial hardship that they could no longer pay for their daughter Holli or their son Stephen to attend college. Champion golfer and philanthropist Phil Mickelson heard of the situation on ESPN and volunteered to pay for Holli's education at Miami University and Stephen's at the University of Kansas.

On June 21, 2018, Dobler was enshrined into the National Polish-American Sports Hall of Fame in Troy, Michigan.

In addition to the physical toll on his body, Dobler suffered cognitive difficulties believed to be the result of football-induced brain trauma during his later years.

Dobler died on February 13, 2023, at the age of 72. He was eulogized in a statement by Cardinals owner Michael Bidwill as "the kind of tough, physical, and fierce player that you love to line up with as a teammate and hate to line up against as an opponent.

Dobler pledged to donate his brain for chronic traumatic encephalopathy (CTE) research in 2010 at age 59 and participated in clinical research at the Boston University CTE Center. Following his death, his family publicly shared his CTE diagnosis to raise awareness and encourage participation in brain injury research.

In February 2025, ESPN reported that Dobler was posthumously diagnosed with Stage 3 Chronic Traumatic Encephalopathy by researchers at Boston University.

== Praise Dobler ==
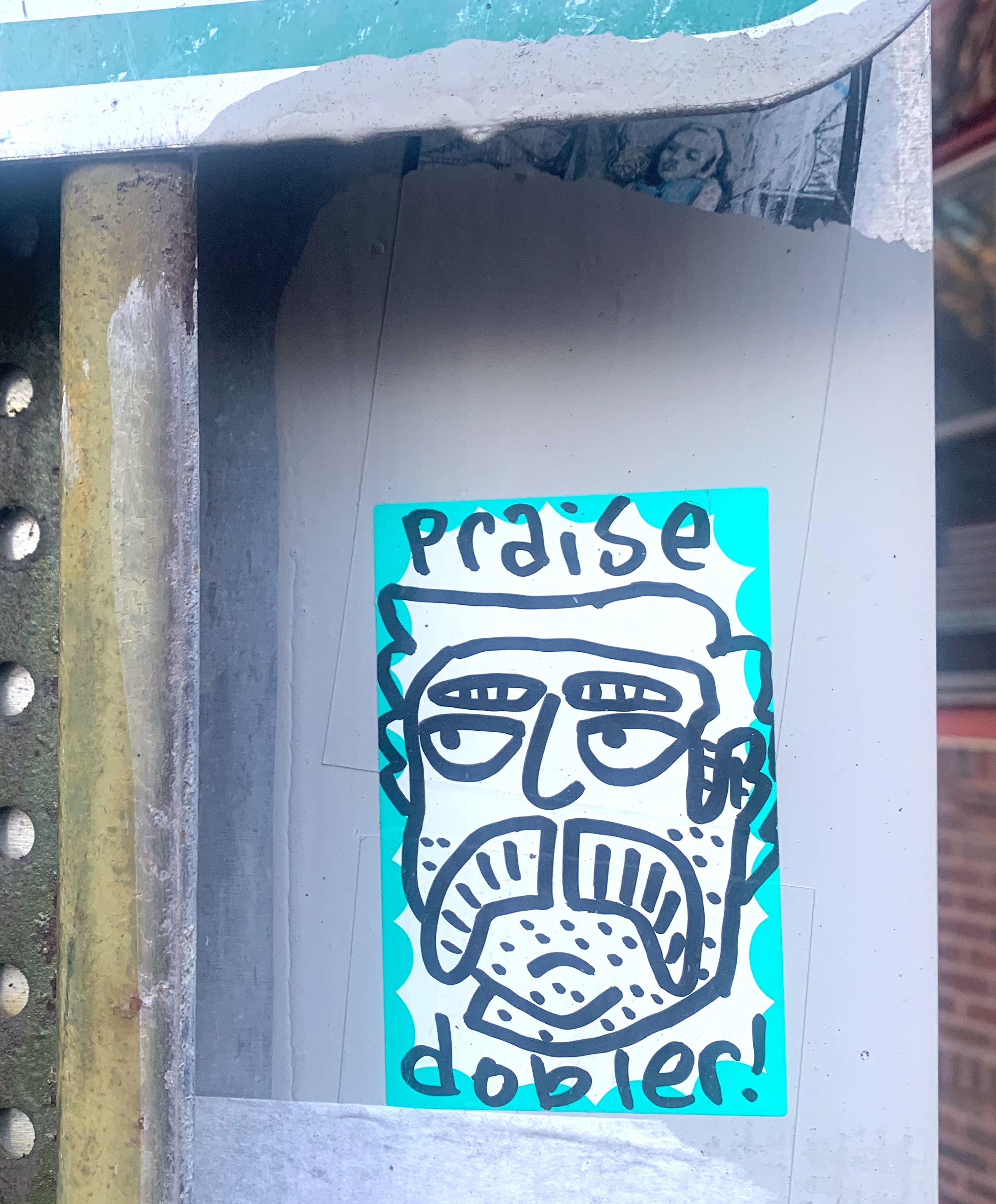
Praise Dobler (Philadelphia)

Since 2018, a street artist in Philadelphia has stickered and graffitied the city's signs and walls with the phrase, "Praise Dobler", often with an illustration of Conrad Dobler. It is one of the most widely seen of contemporary Philadelphia graffiti street art. The artist is anonymous and in interviews has shared that the initiative began in 2009 with his incarceration in Georgia for a DUI and court-ordered recovery. Encouraged to identify a higher power, not finding one in familiar religions, and told he could choose his own higher power, the artist found Dobler's likeness on a box of “Snack Legend” brand cookies. He picked Dobler and began doing graffiti and stickers in 2018 in service of his recovery. The artist met Dobler in 2018 at the National Polish-American Sports Hall of Fame in Troy, Michigan, and shared his story with Dobler. The artist has shared sticker packs with friends who have stickered Praise Dobler in other U.S. cities and abroad.

== Bibliography ==
- Conrad Dobler with Vic Carucci, They Call Me Dirty. New York: Berkley Publishing Group, 1988.
- Conrad Dobler, Pride and Perseverance: A Story of Courage, Hope, and Redemption. Chicago: Triumph Books, 2009.
