= 1980 Pro Bowl =

National Football League all-star game

1980 NFL Pro Bowl
NFC	AFC
37	27
Head coach: Tom Landry (Dallas Cowboys)	Head coach: Don Coryell (San Diego Chargers)
	1	2	3	4	Total
NFC	3	20	7	7	37
AFC	3	7	10	7	27
- Date: January 27, 1980
- Stadium: Aloha Stadium; Honolulu, Hawaii
- MVP: Chuck Muncie (New Orleans Saints)
- Referee: Dick Jorgensen
- Attendance: 48,060

TV in the United States
- Network: ABC
- Announcers: Al Michaels, Howard Cosell and Fran Tarkenton

The 1980 Pro Bowl was the NFL's 30th annual all-star game which featured the outstanding performers from the 1979 season. The game was played on Sunday, January 27, 1980, at Aloha Stadium in Honolulu, Hawaii before 48,060 fans. The final score was NFC 37, AFC 27.

Don Coryell of the San Diego Chargers lead the AFC team against an NFC team coached by Dallas Cowboys head coach Tom Landry. The referee was Dick Jorgensen.

Chuck Muncie of the New Orleans Saints was named the game's Most Valuable Player. Players on the winning NFC team received $5,000 apiece while the AFC participants each took home $2,500.

Starting in his seventh and final Pro Bowl, defensive end Jack Youngblood of the Los Angeles Rams played in the game with a fractured left fibula, just as he had played during the NFC Divisional Playoff and in Super Bowl XIV.

This was the first of thirty consecutive Pro Bowls played in Honolulu. It also marked a return to the game being played on a Sunday.
