= 1981 New Orleans Saints season =

NFL team season

- Owner: John Mecom, Jr.
- Head coach: Bum Phillips
- Home stadium: Louisiana Superdome

Results
- Record: 4–12
- Division place: 4th NFC West
- Playoffs: Did not qualify
- Pro Bowlers: RB George Rogers

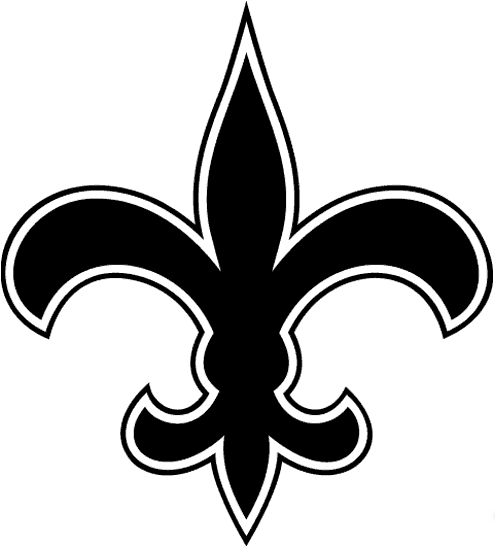

The 1981 New Orleans Saints season was the Saints' fifteenth season in the National Football League. Hoping past success would bring a bright future to New Orleans the Saints hired Bum Phillips to be their new head coach. Phillips had turned around the Houston Oilers after they had suffered similar struggles, eventually taking them to consecutive AFC Championship Games in 1978 and 1979, both of which ended with defeats to the Pittsburgh Steelers. Coming of an NFL worst 1–15 record the previous year, the Saints received the first overall pick in the 1981 draft, which they used to select Heisman Trophy winner George Rogers out of South Carolina. Phillips banked on Rogers giving the Saints the same boost that Earl Campbell did when Phillips drafted him out of Texas three years earlier.

Rogers won the Offensive Rookie of the Year, as he rushed all-time rookie record of 1,674 yards, a record which was eclipsed just two years later when Eric Dickerson of the Los Angeles Rams rushed for 1,808. However, the Saints would continue to struggle finishing with a 4–12 record. It was the Saints’ thirteenth of fifteen seasons with five or fewer wins, and eighth with double-digit defeats.

Despite finishing with a poor record, they did have a couple bright moments, such as defeating the eventual AFC Champion Cincinnati Bengals in the Superdome and defeating the Houston Oilers, Bum Phillips' old team, on the road.

New Orleans swept the NFC West division rival Los Angeles Rams for the first time since they were placed in the same division for the 1970 season.

== Offseason ==
=== NFL draft ===
1981 New Orleans Saints draft
Round	Pick	Player	Position	College	Notes
1	1	George Rogers *	Running back	South Carolina	
2	29	Russell Gary	Safety	Nebraska	
2	51	Rickey Jackson * ^{†}	Linebacker	Pittsburgh	
3	57	Frank Warren	Defensive end	Auburn	
3	71	Hoby Brenner *	Tight end	USC	
5	112	Louis Oubre	Guard	Oklahoma	
5	128	Jerry Boyarsky	Defensive tackle	Pittsburgh	
6	139	Nat Hudson	Guard	Georgia	
6	144	Johnnie Poe	Defensive back	Missouri	
6	166	Glen Redd	Linebacker	BYU	
7	167	Kevin Williams	Wide receiver	USC	
8	214	Gene Gladys	Linebacker	Penn State	
8	215	Kevin Evans	Cornerback	Arkansas	
9	222	Toussaint Tyler	Running back	Washington	
10	249	Hokie Gajan	Running back	LSU	
11	277	Lester Mickens	Wide receiver	Kansas	
12	305	Jim Wilks	Defensive end	San Diego State	
Made roster † Pro Football Hall of Fame * Made at least one Pro Bowl during career

=== Undrafted free agents ===
1981 undrafted free agents of note
Player	Position	College
Monte Bennett	Defensive tackle	Kansas State

== Personnel ==
=== Staff ===
1981 New Orleans Saints staff
Front office: Owner – John Mecom, Jr.; Director of Football Operations – Harry Hulmes; Director of Player Personnel – Pat Peppler; Head coaches: Head coach – Bum Phillips; Offensive coaches: Offensive coordinator – King Hill; Offensive backfield – John Levra; Receivers – Lamar McHan; Offensive line – Joe Spencer	Defensive coaches: Defensive coordinator – Wade Phillips; Defensive line – Willie Zapalac; Linebackers – John Paul Young; Defensive backfield – Lance Van Zandt; Special teams coaches: Special teams – Harold Richardson; Strength and conditioning: Strength and Conditioning – Russell Paternostro

=== Roster ===
1981 New Orleans Saints roster
Quarterbacks (QB): 8 Archie Manning; 12 Bobby Scott; 18 Dave Wilson; Running backs (RB): 45 Jack Holmes; 38 George Rogers; 41 Jimmy Rogers; 32 Scott Stauch; 42 Toussaint Tyler; 30 Wayne Wilson; Wide receivers (WR): 48 Jeff Groth; 86 Rich Martini; 19 Guido Merkens; 89 Aundra Thompson; Tight ends (TE): 85 Hoby Brenner; 87 Larry Hardy	Offensive linemen (OL): 61 Sam Adams G; 67 Stan Brock T; 62 John Hill C; 69 Nat Hudson G; 64 Dave Lafary T; 76 Jim Pietrzak C; 68 Fred Sturt G; 65 Bob Young G; Defensive linemen (DL): 91 Monte Bennett NT; 77 Jerry Boyarsky NT; 78 Elois Grooms DE; 74 Derland Moore DE; 73 Frank Warren DE; 94 Jim Wilks DE	Linebackers (LB): 50 Ken Bordelon OLB; 59 Chuck Evans ILB; 52 Jim Kovach ILB; 57 Rickey Jackson OLB; 55 Rob Nairne OLB; 53 Scott Pelluer ILB; 58 Glen Redd OLB; Defensive backs (DB): 20 Russell Gary SS; 37 Tom Myers FS; 25 Johnnie Poe CB; 47 Mike Spivey CB; 49 Frank Wattelet SS/FS; 44 Dave Waymer CB; Special teams (ST): 14 Russell Erxleben P; 1 Benny Ricardo K; 54 Paul Ryczek LS	Reserve: 63 Barry Bennett NT (IR); 98 Donnie Echols TE (IR); 46 Hokie Gajan FB (IR); 92 Gene Gladys LB (IR); 73 Jeff Harper C (IR); 82 Ike Harris WR (IR); 28 Bill Hurley S (IR); 60 Tom Kearns G (IR); 56 Reggie Mathis LB (IR); 84 Rich Mauti WR (IR); 26 Lester Mickens WR (IR); 66 Louis Oubre G (IR); 83 Tinker Owens WR (PUP); 71 J. T. Taylor T (IR); Rookies in italics

== Regular season ==
=== Schedule ===
Week	Date	Opponent	Result	Record	Venue	Attendance
1	September 6	at **Atlanta Falcons**	**L** 0–27	0–1	Atlanta–Fulton County Stadium	57,406
2	September 13	**Los Angeles Rams**	**W** 23–17	1–1	Louisiana Superdome	62,063
3	September 20	at New York Giants	**L** 7–20	1–2	Giants Stadium	69,814
4	September 27	at **San Francisco 49ers**	**L** 14–21	1–3	Candlestick Park	44,433
5	October 4	Pittsburgh Steelers	**L** 6–20	1–4	Louisiana Superdome	64,578
6	October 11	Philadelphia Eagles	**L** 14–31	1–5	Louisiana Superdome	52,728
7	October 18	at Cleveland Browns	**L** 17–20	1–6	Cleveland Municipal Stadium	76,059
8	October 25	Cincinnati Bengals	**W** 17–7	2–6	Louisiana Superdome	46,336
9	November 1	**Atlanta Falcons**	**L** 10–41	2–7	Louisiana Superdome	63,637
10	November 8	at **Los Angeles Rams**	**W** 21–13	3–7	Anaheim Stadium	61,068
11	November 15	at Minnesota Vikings	**L** 10–20	3–8	Metropolitan Stadium	45,215
12	November 22	at Houston Oilers	**W** 27–24	4–8	Houston Astrodome	49,581
13	November 29	Tampa Bay Buccaneers	**L** 14–31	4–9	Louisiana Superdome	62,209
14	December 6	at St. Louis Cardinals	**L** 3–30	4–10	Busch Memorial Stadium	46,923
15	December 13	Green Bay Packers	**L** 7–35	4–11	Louisiana Superdome	45,518
16	December 20	**San Francisco 49ers**	**L** 17–21	4–12	Louisiana Superdome	43,639
Note: Intra-division opponents are in **bold** text.

=== Standings ===
NFC West
	W	L	T	PCT	DIV	CONF	PF	PA	STK
San Francisco 49ers^{(1)}	13	3	0	.813	5–1	10-2	357	250	W5
Atlanta Falcons	7	9	0	.438	3–3	6–6	426	355	L3
Los Angeles Rams	6	10	0	.375	2–4	5–7	303	351	L1
New Orleans Saints	4	12	0	.250	2–4	2–10	207	378	L4

== Awards and records ==
- George Rogers, NFL rushing title, 1,674 yards
- George Rogers, franchise record, most rushing yards by a rookie, 1,674 yards
- George Rogers, NFL Record (since broken), most rushing yards by a rookie, 1,674 yards
