= 1980 New Orleans Saints season =

NFL team season (1st 1–15 season)

- General manager: Steve Rosenbloom
- Head coach: Dick Nolan (fired Nov. 26; 0–12 record); Dick Stanfel (interim; 1–3 record)
- Home stadium: Louisiana Superdome

Results
- Record: 1–15
- Division place: 4th NFC West
- Playoffs: Did not qualify
- Pro Bowlers: None

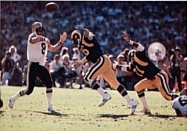
Archie Manning attempting a pass for the Saints during a game against the Los Angeles Rams in 1980.

The 1980 New Orleans Saints season was the team's 14th as a member of the National Football League (NFL). The Saints failed to improve on the previous season's record of 8–8, instead winning only one game. The team missed the playoffs for the fourteenth consecutive season and had the dubious distinction not only of winning only a single game, but winning it by a single point against the New York Jets, who like the Saints had widely been predicted before the season to advance to the playoffs, but struggled instead. The main culprit of the Saints' collapse was the defense, which ranked last in yards and points (487) allowed.

The team's only bright spot was tenth-year quarterback Archie Manning, who proceeded to have the best year of his career, throwing for 3,716 yards, 23 touchdowns and 20 interceptions.

== Season summary ==
Disgruntled fans called their team “the Aints”, going so far as to show up to games wearing brown paper bags over their heads after their team was 0–12 and playing the Los Angeles Rams, to whom they lost 27–7 on Monday Night Football. In embarrassment, they called themselves the Unknown Fan (a spinoff from The Unknown Comic) in a practice that would become the trademark of disgruntled fans across various sports in the United States. Coach Dick Nolan was fired after this game, and replaced by Dick Stanfel. In Week 14, playing the San Francisco 49ers in Candlestick Park, the Saints charged out to a 35–7 lead at halftime, led by three touchdown passes from Archie Manning and a pair of one-yard touchdown runs from Jack Holmes. However, the 49ers rallied behind quarterback Joe Montana, who rushed for a touchdown and passed for two more. The 49ers tied the game 35–35 on a fourth-quarter touchdown run by Lenvil Elliott and went on to win in overtime, 38–35, on a Ray Wersching field goal. The 28-point comeback by the 49ers was, at the time, the largest comeback in NFL history, and was the largest comeback in regular season history until it was eclipsed in 2022 by the Minnesota Vikings, who rallied from a 33-0 halftime deficit vs. the Indianapolis Colts to win 39–36 in overtime.

After equaling the 1976 Buccaneers’ record single-season 14-game losing streak and looking likely to become the first team to finish 0–16 when down 7–13 after three quarters against the New York Jets on a day of 46 miles per hour (74 km/h) winds and a wind chill-adjusted temperature of 5 °F (−15 °C), quarterback Archie Manning threw a touchdown pass into the gale to Tony Galbreath to go ahead 14–13 and then another to win 21–20.

The 2013 Houston Texans matched the 14-game losing streak of both the 1980 Saints and the 1976 Buccaneers after starting 2–0.

The 1980 Saints were the first team to end the season at 1–15. The 1989 Dallas Cowboys, 1990 New England Patriots, 1991 Indianapolis Colts, 1996 New York Jets, 2000 San Diego Chargers, 2001 Carolina Panthers, 2007 Miami Dolphins, 2009 St. Louis Rams, 2016 Cleveland Browns, and 2020 Jacksonville Jaguars later matched the 1980 Saints by finishing 1–15, but the 2008 Detroit Lions and 2017 Cleveland Browns both exceeded it by finishing with an 0–16 record. The 1991 Colts (vs. Jets) and 2000 Chargers (vs. Chiefs) also won their lone games by a single point. With the NFL extending to a 17-game season beginning in 2021, NFL teams can no longer have the possibility to finish a season 1-15.

== Offseason ==
=== NFL draft ===
1980 New Orleans Saints draft
Round	Pick	Player	Position	College	Notes
1	12	Stan Brock	Offensive tackle	Colorado	
2	41	Dave Waymer *	Safety	Notre Dame	
4	96	Mike Jolly	Cornerback	Michigan	
6	150	Lester Boyd	Linebacker	Kentucky	
7	177	Mike Morucci	Running back	Bloomsburg	
8	206	Chuck Evans	Linebacker	Stanford	
9	233	Frank Mordica	Running back	Vanderbilt	
10	262	Tanya Webb	Defensive end	Michigan State	
11	289	George Woodard	Running back	Texas A&M	
12	318	Kiser Lewis	Linebacker	Florida A&M	
Made roster * Made at least one Pro Bowl during career

=== Undrafted free agents ===
1980 undrafted free agents of note
Player	Position	College
Allen Anderson	Defensive back	Northern Illinois
Eric Anderson	Quarterback	California
John Arbeznik	Guard	Michigan
Mike Armand	Cornerback	New Mexico State
Mike Augustyniak	Fullback	Purdue
Gordon Banks	Wide receiver	Stanford
Ron Barnes	Safety	Houston
Steve Ensmimger	Quarterback	LSU

== Personnel ==
=== Staff ===
1980 New Orleans Saints staff
Front office: President – John W. Mecom, Jr.; Head coaches: Head Coach – Dick Nolan; Offensive coaches: Offensive Coordinator – Ed Hughes; Quarterbacks/Receivers – Lamar McHan; Offensive Backfield – Nick Nicolau; Offensive Line – Dick Stanfel	Defensive coaches: Defensive Coordinator – Ed Beard; Defensive Line – Tom Pratt; Defensive Backfield – Fred Glick; Special teams coaches: Special Teams – Whitey Campbell; Strength and conditioning: Strength – Lou Riecke

=== Roster ===
1980 New Orleans Saints roster
Quarterbacks (QB): 7 Guy Benjamin; 8 Archie Manning; 12 Bobby Scott; Running backs (RB): 43 Larry Collins; 34 Tony Galbreath; 45 Jack Holmes; 41 Jimmy Rogers; 30 Wayne Wilson; Wide receivers (WR): 80 Gordon Banks; 89 Wes Chandler; 86 Tom Donovan; 82 Ike Harris; 49 Artie Owens; Tight ends (TE): 85 Henry Childs; 87 Larry Hardy	Offensive linemen (OL): 67 Stan Brock T; 62 John Hill C; 64 Dave Lafary T; 76 Jim Pietrzak C; 68 Fred Sturt G; 65 Robert Woods G/T; 79 Emanuel Zanders G; Defensive linemen (DL): 63 Barry Bennett DT; 72 Mike Fultz DT; 78 Elois Grooms DE; 53 Tommy Hart DE; 74 Derland Moore DT; 96 Steve Parker DE; 75 Elex Price DT	Linebackers (LB): 50 Ken Bordelon OLB; 59 Chuck Evans MLB; 58 Joe Federspiel MLB; 51 Stan Holloway OLB; 56 Reggie Mathis OLB; 55 Dave Washington OLB; Defensive backs (DB): 27 Ray Brown SS; 23 Jim Marshall CB; 26 Guido Merkens FS; 37 Tom Myers FS; 22 Ricky Ray CB; 48 Don Schwartz SS; 47 Mike Spivey CB; 44 Dave Waymer CB; Special teams (ST): 14 Russell Erxleben P; 1 Benny Ricardo K	Reserve: 54 Lester Boyd LB (IR); 52 Jim Kovach LB (IR); 84 Rich Mauti WR (IR); 83 Tinker Owens WR (IR); -- Dan Pensick DT (IR); 60 Don Reese DE (Susp.); 71 J. T. Taylor T (IR); 88 Brooks Williams TE (IR); Rookies in italics

== Schedule ==
Week	Date	Opponent	Result	Record	Venue	Attendance
1	September 7	**San Francisco 49ers**	**L** 23–26	0–1	Louisiana Superdome	58,621
2	September 14	at Chicago Bears	**L** 3–22	0–2	Soldier Field	62,523
3	September 21	Buffalo Bills	**L** 26–35	0–3	Louisiana Superdome	51,154
4	September 28	at Miami Dolphins	**L** 16–21	0–4	Miami Orange Bowl	40,946
5	October 5	St. Louis Cardinals	**L** 7–40	0–5	Louisiana Superdome	45,388
6	October 12	at Detroit Lions	**L** 13–24	0–6	Pontiac Silverdome	78,147
7	October 19	**Atlanta Falcons**	**L** 14–41	0–7	Louisiana Superdome	62,651
8	October 26	at Washington Redskins	**L** 14–22	0–8	RFK Stadium	51,375
9	November 2	at **Los Angeles Rams**	**L** 31–45	0–9	Anaheim Stadium	59,909
10	November 9	Philadelphia Eagles	**L** 21–34	0–10	Louisiana Superdome	44,340
11	November 16	at **Atlanta Falcons**	**L** 13–31	0–11	Atlanta–Fulton County Stadium	53,871
12	November 24	**Los Angeles Rams**	**L** 7–27	0–12	Louisiana Superdome	53,448
13	November 30	Minnesota Vikings	**L** 20–23	0–13	Louisiana Superdome	30,936
14	December 7	at **San Francisco 49ers**	**L** 35–38 (OT)	0–14	Candlestick Park	37,949
15	December 14	at New York Jets	**W** 21–20	1–14	Shea Stadium	38,077
16	December 21	New England Patriots	**L** 27–38	1–15	Louisiana Superdome	38,277
Note: Intra-division opponents are in **bold** text.

== Game summaries ==
=== Week 1: vs. San Francisco 49ers ===
Week One: San Francisco 49ers at New Orleans Saints

Quarter	1	2	3	4	Total
49ers	0	14	6	6	26
Saints	0	7	6	10	23

at Louisiana Superdome, New Orleans, Louisiana

- Date: September 7
- Game time: 12:00 p.m. CDT
- Game weather: None (played indoors)
- Game attendance: 58,621
- Box score

Game information

First quarter

- No scoring plays

Second quarter

- NO – Tony Galbreath 1-yard run (Russell Erxleben kick). Saints 7–0.
- SF – Earl Cooper 1-yard run (Ray Wersching kick). Tied 7–7.
- SF – Earl Cooper 6-yard run (Ray Wersching kick). 49ers 14–7.

Third quarter

- SF – Paul Hofer 27-yard pass from Steve DeBerg (kick failed). 49ers 20–7.
- NO – Chuck Muncie 7-yard run (run failed). 49ers 20–13.

Fourth quarter

- SF – Ray Wersching 37-yard field goal. 49ers 23–13.
- NO – Wes Chandler 49-yard pass from Archie Manning (Russell Erxleben kick). 49ers 23–20.
- NO – Russell Erxleben 37-yard field goal. Tied 23–23.
- SF – Ray Wersching 38-yard field goal. 49ers 26–23.

Top passers

- SF – Steve DeBerg – 21/29, 223 yards, TD, INT
- NO – Archie Manning – 25/40, 314 yards, TD

Top rushers

- SF – Earl Cooper – 17 rushes, 77 yards, 2 TD
- NO – Chuck Muncie – 12 rushes, 57 yards, TD

Top receivers

- SF – Paul Hofer – 7 receptions, 114 yards, TD
- NO – Larry Hardy – 6 receptions, 103 yards

=== Week 2: at Chicago Bears ===
Week Two: New Orleans Saints at Chicago Bears

Quarter	1	2	3	4	Total
Saints	3	0	0	0	3
Bears	10	3	2	7	22

at Soldier Field, Chicago, Illinois

- Date: September 14
- Game time: 1:00 p.m. CDT
- Game weather: Cloudy, 67 °F (19 °C)
- Game attendance: 62,523
- Referee: Bob McElwee
- TV announcers (CBS): Tim Ryan and Johnny Morris
- Box score

Game information

First quarter

- CHI – Bob Thomas 37-yard field goal. Bears 3–0.
- NO – Russell Erxleben 26-yard field goal. Tied 3–3.
- CHI – Bob Fisher 56-yard pass from Mike Phipps (Bob Thomas kick). Bears 10–3.

Second quarter

- CHI – Bob Thomas 35-yard field goal. Bears 13–3.

Third quarter

- CHI – Archie Manning sacked in own end zone by Alan Page. Bears 15–3.

Fourth quarter

- CHI – Walter Payton 69-yard run (Bob Thomas kick). Bears 22–3.

Top passers

- NO – Archie Manning – 15/27, 168 yards, 2 INT
- CHI – Mike Phipps – 7/24, 115 yards, TD

Top rushers

- NO – Chuck Muncie – 13 rushes, 79 yards
- CHI – Walter Payton – 18 rushes, 183 yards, TD

Top receivers

- NO – Ike Harris – 5 receptions, 75 yards
- CHI – Bob Fisher – 1 reception, 56 yards, TD

=== Week 3: vs Buffalo Bills ===
Week Three: Buffalo Bills at New Orleans Saints

Quarter	1	2	3	4	Total
Bills	7	7	7	14	35
Saints	0	19	0	7	26

at Louisiana Superdome, New Orleans, Louisiana

- Date: September 21
- Game time: 1:00 p.m. CDT
- Game weather: None (played indoors)
- Game attendance: 51,154
- Referee: Fred Wyant
- TV announcers (NBC): Jay Rudolph and Gene Washington
- Box score

Game information

First quarter

- BUF – Frank Lewis 12-yard pass from Joe Ferguson (Nick Mike-Mayer kick). Bills 7–0.

Second quarter

- NO – Chuck Muncie 1-yard run (Benny Ricardo kick). Tie 7–7.
- BUF – Joe Cribbs 12-yard run (Nick Mike-Mayer kick). Bills 14–7.
- NO – Ike Harris 44-yard pass from Archie Manning. Bills 14–13.
- NO – Benny Ricardo 45-yard field goal. Saints 16–14.
- NO – Benny Ricardo 47-yard field goal. Saints 19–14.

Third quarter

- BUF – Frank Lewis 18-yard pass from Joe Ferguson (Nick Mike-Mayer kick). Bills 21–19.

Fourth quarter

- BUF – Mark Brammer 2-yard pass from Joe Ferguson (Nick Mike-Mayer kick). Bills 28–19.
- BUF – Joe Cribbs 7-yard run (Nick Mike-Mayer kick). Bills 35-19.
- NO – Ike Harris 15-yard pass from Archie Manning (Benny Ricardo kick). Bills 35–26.

Top passers

- BUF – Joe Ferguson – 22/31, 295 yards, 3 TD, 2 INT
- NO – Archie Manning – 24/34, 285 yards, 2 TD

Top rushers

- BUF – Joe Cribbs – 22 rushes, 89 yards, 2 TD
- NO – Chuck Muncie – 10 rushes, 22 yards

Top receivers

- BUF – Jerry Butler – 5 receptions, 133 yards
- NO – Brooks Williams – 6 receptions, 89 yards

=== Week 14: at San Francisco 49ers ===
Week Fourteen: New Orleans Saints at San Francisco 49ers

Quarter	1	2	3	4	OT	Total
Saints	14	21	0	0	0	35
49ers	0	7	14	14	3	38

at Candlestick Park, San Francisco, California

- Date: December 7
- Game time: 3:00 p.m. CST / 1:00 p.m. PST
- Game weather: Sunny, 48 °F (9 °C)
- Game attendance: 37,949
- Referee: Dick Jorgensen
- TV announcers (CBS): Jim Kelly and Jim Hill
- Box score

Game information

First quarter

- NO – Ike Harris 33-yard pass from Archie Manning (Benny Ricardo kick). Saints 7–0.
- NO – Henry Childs 21-yard pass from Archie Manning (Benny Ricardo kick). Saints 14–0.

Second quarter

- NO – Jack Holmes 1-yard run (Benny Ricardo kick). Saints 21–0.
- SF – Freddie Solomon 57-yard punt return (Ray Wersching kick). Saints 21–7.
- NO – Jack Holmes 1-yard run (Benny Ricardo kick). Saints 28–7.
- NO – Ike Harris 41-yard pass from Archie Manning (Benny Ricardo kick). Saints 35–7.

Third quarter

- SF – Joe Montana 1-yard run (Ray Wersching kick). Saints 35–14.
- SF – Dwight Clark 71-yard pass from Joe Montana (Ray Wersching kick). Saints 35–21.

Fourth quarter

- SF – Freddie Solomon 14-yard pass from Joe Montana (Ray Wersching kick). Saints 35–28.
- SF – Lenvil Elliott 7-yard run (Ray Wersching kick). Tied 35–35.

Overtime

- SF – Ray Wersching 36-yard field goal. 49ers 38–35.

Top passers

- NO – Archie Manning – 24/38, 377 yards, 3 TD, INT
- SF – Joe Montana – 24/36, 285 yards, 2 TD

Top rushers

- NO – Tony Galbreath – 16 rushes, 86 yards
- SF – Lenvil Elliott – 20 rushes, 125 yards, TD

Top receivers

- NO – Henry Childs – 8 receptions, 144 yards, TD
- SF – Dwight Clark – 6 receptions, 155 yards, TD

=== Week 15: at New York Jets ===
Week Fifteen: New Orleans Saints at New York Jets

Quarter	1	2	3	4	Total
Saints	7	0	0	14	21
Jets	0	13	0	7	20

at Shea Stadium, Flushing, New York

- Date: December 14
- Game time: 12:00 p.m. CST / 1:00 p.m. EST
- Game weather: Partly cloudy, 31 °F (−1 °C)
- Game attendance: 38,077
- Box score

Game information

First quarter

- NO – Jack Holmes 14-yard pass from Archie Manning (Benny Ricardo kick). Saints 7–0.

Second quarter

- NYJ – Kevin Long 1-yard run (Pat Leahy kick). Tied 7–7.
- NYJ – Pat Leahy 27-yard field goal. Jets 10–7.
- NYJ – Pat Leahy 47-yard field goal. Jets 13–7.

Third quarter

- No scoring plays

Fourth quarter

- NO – Tony Galbreath 1-yard run (Benny Ricardo kick). Saints 14–13.
- NYJ – Richard Todd 31-yard run (Pat Leahy kick). Jets 20–14.
- NO – Tony Galbreath 1-yard run (Benny Ricardo kick). Saints 21–20.

Top passers

- NO – Archie Manning – 20/30, 198 yards, TD
- NYJ – Richard Todd – 10/27, 77 yards, 2 INT

Top rushers

- NO – Jimmy Rogers – 8 rushes, 52 yards
- NYJ – Tom Newton – 23 rushes, 117 yards

Top receivers

- NO – Wes Chandler – 3 receptions, 64 yards
- NYJ – Bruce Harper – 5 receptions, 34 yards

== Standings ==
NFC West
	W	L	T	PCT	DIV	CONF	PF	PA	STK
^{(1)} Atlanta Falcons	12	4	0	.750	5–1	10–2	405	272	L1
^{(5)} Los Angeles Rams	11	5	0	.688	5–1	9–3	424	289	W2
San Francisco 49ers	6	10	0	.375	2–4	4–8	320	415	L2
New Orleans Saints	1	15	0	.063	0–6	0–12	291	487	L1
