= 1983 New Orleans Saints season =

NFL team season

- Owner: John Mecom, Jr.
- General manager: Bum Phillips
- Head coach: Bum Phillips
- Home stadium: Louisiana Superdome

Results
- Record: 8–8
- Division place: 3rd NFC West
- Playoffs: Did not qualify
- Pro Bowlers: LB Rickey Jackson

The 1983 New Orleans Saints season was the team's 17th as a member of the National Football League. They improved on their previous season’s output of 4–5, winning eight games. Despite the improvement, the team failed to qualify for the playoffs for the seventeenth consecutive season.

With an 8–7 record going into the final game of the season at the Superdome against the Los Angeles Rams, the Saints, with a win, would have finished with their first winning season and their first playoff berth. However, Rams kicker Mike Lansford kicked a 42-yard field goal with :06 left to defeat the Saints 26–24, and advance to the playoffs. Other than that field goal, the Rams did not score a single point on offense, instead scoring via a punt return for a touchdown, two interception returns for touchdowns, and a safety.

Two weeks earlier the Saints lost to the New England Patriots in shocking conditions with sleet and snow – with the only score being set up by Patriot Ricky Smith returning the initial kickoff to the 3-yard line. As of 2024, this game remains the most recent 7–0 result in NFL history, with only four games since seeing just one score, three with a single field goal and one with a touchdown and a missed extra point. (Note: These 3–0 scores occurred in 1993 when the Jets defeated the Redskins in 2007 when the Steelers defeated the Dolphins and in 2023 when the Las Vegas Raiders defeated the Minnesota Vikings. The 6-0 game was the Dallas Cowboys over the Philadelphia Eagles in 2017.)

Another damaging loss came on Monday Night Football in week 12, when the New York Jets rallied from a 28-14 deficit by scoring 17 unanswered points in the fourth quarter, capped off by a 76-yard punt return touchdown by Kirk Springs, to stun the Saints 31–28. The Saints had a chance to force overtime in the closing seconds, but Morten Andersen missed badly to the left on a 51-yard field goal attempt.

== Offseason ==
=== NFL draft ===
1983 New Orleans Saints draft
Round	Pick	Player	Position	College	Notes
2	38	Steve Korte	Center	Arkansas	
3	65	John Tice	Tight end	Maryland	
3	66	Cliff Austin	Running back	Clemson	
4	98	Gary Lewis	Defensive tackle	Oklahoma State	
8	206	David Greenwood	Safety	Wisconsin	
Made roster

== Personnel ==
=== Staff ===
1983 New Orleans Saints staff
Front office: Owner – John Mecom, Jr.; President – Eddie Jones; Director of Football Operations – Pat Peppler; Head coaches: Head coach/General Manager – Bum Phillips; Offensive coaches: Offensive coordinator – King Hill; Offensive backfield – John Levra; Receivers – Lamar McHan; Offensive line – Carl Mauck; Quality control – Joe Spencer	Defensive coaches: Defensive coordinator – Wade Phillips; Defensive line – Willie Zapalac; Linebackers – John Paul Young; Defensive backfield – Lance Van Zandt; Special teams coaches: Special teams – Harold Richardson; Strength and conditioning: Strength and Conditioning – Russell Paternostro

=== Roster ===
1983 New Orleans Saints roster
Quarterbacks (QB): 19 Guido Merkens; 16 Ken Stabler; 18 Dave Wilson; Running backs (RB): 47 Cliff Austin; 46 Hokie Gajan; 38 George Rogers; 41 Jimmy Rogers; 45 Tim Wilson; 30 Wayne Wilson; Wide receivers (WR): 83 Kenny Duckett; 88 Eugene Goodlow; 86 Jeff Groth; 84 Rich Mauti; 80 Lindsay Scott; 89 Tyrone Young; Tight ends (TE): 85 Hoby Brenner; 82 John Tice	Offensive linemen (OL): 67 Stan Brock T; 78 Kelvin Clark G; 63 Brad Edelman G; 72 Leon Gray T; 62 John Hill C; 60 Steve Korte G; 64 Dave Lafary T; 68 Louis Oubre G; 76 Jim Pietrzak C; Defensive linemen (DL): 75 Bruce Clark DE; 99 Tony Elliott NT; 93 Gary Lewis NT; 98 Reggie Lewis DE; 74 Derland Moore NT; 73 Frank Warren DE; 94 Jim Wilks DE	Linebackers (LB): 57 Rickey Jackson OLB; 52 Jim Kovach ILB; 55 Rob Nairne OLB; 51 Whitney Paul OLB; 53 Scott Pelluer ILB; 58 Glen Redd ILB; 56 Dennis Winston ILB; Defensive backs (DB): 20 Russell Gary SS; 34 Bobby Johnson CB; 32 Vernon Perry SS; 25 Johnnie Poe CB; 27 Greg Stemrick CB; 49 Frank Wattelet FS; 44 Dave Waymer CB; Special teams (ST): 7 Morten Andersen K; 14 Russell Erxleben P	Reserve: 50 Ken Bordelon LB (IR); 87 Larry Hardy TE (IR); 21 John Krimm DB (IR); 29 Rodney Lewis CB (IR); 59 Chris Martin LB (IR); Rookies in italics

== Schedule ==
Week	Date	Opponent	Result	Record	Venue	Attendance
1	September 4	St. Louis Cardinals	**W** 28–17	1–0	Louisiana Superdome	60,430
2	September 11	at **Los Angeles Rams**	**L** 27–30	1—1	Anaheim Stadium	45,572
3	September 18	Chicago Bears	**W** 34–31 (OT)	2–1	Louisiana Superdome	64,692
4	September 25	at Dallas Cowboys	**L** 20–21	2—2	Texas Stadium	62,136
5	October 2	Miami Dolphins	**W** 17–7	3–2	Louisiana Superdome	66,489
6	October 9	at **Atlanta Falcons**	**W** 19–17	4–2	Atlanta–Fulton County Stadium	51,654
7	October 16	**San Francisco 49ers**	**L** 13–32	4–3	Louisiana Superdome	68,154
8	October 23	at Tampa Bay Buccaneers	**W** 24–21	5–3	Tampa Stadium	48,242
9	October 30	at Buffalo Bills	**L** 21–27	5–4	Rich Stadium	49,413
10	November 6	**Atlanta Falcons**	**W** 27–10	6–4	Louisiana Superdome	67,062
11	November 13	at **San Francisco 49ers**	**L** 0–27	6–5	Candlestick Park	40,022
12	November 21	New York Jets	**L** 28–31	6—6	Louisiana Superdome	68,606
13	November 27	Minnesota Vikings	**W** 17–16	7–6	Louisiana Superdome	59,502
14	December 4	at New England Patriots	**L** 0–7	7—7	Sullivan Stadium	24,579
15	December 11	at Philadelphia Eagles	**W** 20–17 (OT)	8–7	Veterans Stadium	45,182
16	December 18	**Los Angeles Rams**	**L** 24–26	8—8	Louisiana Superdome	70,148
Note: Intra-division opponents are in **bold** text.

== Standings ==
NFC West
	W	L	T	PCT	DIV	CONF	PF	PA	STK
San Francisco 49ers^{(2)}	10	6	0	.625	4–2	8–4	432	293	W3
Los Angeles Rams^{(5)}	9	7	0	.563	5–1	8–4	361	344	W1
New Orleans Saints	8	8	0	.500	2–4	7–5	319	337	L1
Atlanta Falcons	7	9	0	.438	1–5	4–8	370	389	W1
