= 1982 New Orleans Saints season =

NFL team season

- Owner: John Mecom, Jr.
- General manager: Bum Phillips
- Head coach: Bum Phillips
- Home stadium: Louisiana Superdome

Results
- Record: 4–5
- Conference place: 9th NFC (would have been 2nd in the NFC West)
- Playoffs: Did not qualify
- Pro Bowlers: RB George Rogers

The 1982 New Orleans Saints season saw the team nearly qualify for the NFL playoffs, missing it by a tiebreaker. The Saints finished with a 4–5 record, and narrowly missed the playoffs in a complicated labyrinth of tie-breakers.

== Offseason ==
=== NFL draft ===
1982 New Orleans Saints draft
Round	Pick	Player	Position	College	Notes
1	13	Lindsay Scott	Wide receiver	Georgia	
2	30	Brad Edelman *	Guard	Missouri	
3	58	Rodney Lewis	Defensive back	Nebraska	
3	66	Eugene Goodlow	Wide receiver	Kansas State	
3	68	Kenny Duckett	Wide receiver	Wake Forest	
3	76	John Krimm	Defensive back	Notre Dame	
4	86	Morten Andersen * ^{†}	Placekicker	Michigan State	
5	114	Tony Elliott	Defensive tackle	North Texas	
6	142	Marvin Lewis	Running back	Tulane	
8	198	Chuck Slaughter	Offensive tackle	South Carolina	
Made roster * Made at least one Pro Bowl during career

== Personnel ==
=== Staff ===
1982 New Orleans Saints staff
Front office: Owner – John Mecom, Jr.; President – Eddie Jones; Director of Football Operations – Harry Hulmes; Director of player personnel – Pat Peppler; Head coaches: Head coach/General Manager – Bum Phillips; Offensive coaches: Offensive coordinator – King Hill; Offensive backfield – John Levra; Receivers – Lamar McHan; Offensive line – Joe Spencer; Assistant Offensive Line – Carl Mauck	Defensive coaches: Defensive coordinator – Wade Phillips; Defensive line – Willie Zapalac; Linebackers – John Paul Young; Defensive backfield – Lance Van Zandt; Special teams coaches: Special teams – Harold Richardson; Strength and conditioning: Strength and Conditioning – Russell Paternostro

=== Roster ===
1982 New Orleans Saints roster
Quarterbacks (QB): 19 Guido Merkens; 12 Bobby Scott; 16 Ken Stabler; Running backs (RB): 46 Hokie Gajan; 45 Jack Holmes; 24 Marvin Lewis; 38 George Rogers; 41 Jimmy Rogers; 42 Toussaint Tyler; 30 Wayne Wilson; Wide receivers (WR): 83 Kenny Duckett; 86 Jeff Groth; 84 Rich Mauti; 80 Lindsay Scott; 89 Aundra Thompson; Tight ends (TE): 87 Larry Hardy	Offensive linemen (OL): 67 Stan Brock T; 78 Kelvin Clark G; 63 Brad Edelman G; 72 Leon Gray T; 62 John Hill C; 64 Dave Lafary T; 66 Louis Oubre G; 76 Jim Pietrzak C; 79 Chuck Slaughter T; Defensive linemen (DL): 75 Bruce Clark DE; 99 Tony Elliott NT; 98 Reggie Lewis DE; 74 Derland Moore NT; 73 Frank Warren DE; 94 Jim Wilks DE	Linebackers (LB): 50 Ken Bordelon OLB; 57 Rickey Jackson OLB; 52 Jim Kovach ILB; 55 Rob Nairne OLB; 51 Whitney Paul OLB; 53 Scott Pelluer ILB; 54 Ed Simonini ILB; 56 Dennis Winston ILB; Defensive backs (DB): 20 Russell Gary SS; 33 Kevin Gray CB; 28 Bill Hurley SS; 21 John Krimm FS; 29 Rodney Lewis CB; 25 Johnnie Poe CB; 49 Frank Wattelet FS; 44 Dave Waymer CB; Special teams (ST): 7 Morten Andersen K; 14 Russell Erxleben P	Reserve: 85 Hoby Brenner TE (IR); 65 Calvin Close G (IR); -- Marvin Dumas WR (IR); 37 Tom Myers S (IR); 58 Glen Redd LB (IR); 18 Dave Wilson QB (IR); Rookies in italics

== Regular season ==
=== Schedule ===
Week	Date	Opponent	Result	Record	Venue	Attendance
1	September 12	St. Louis Cardinals	**L** 7–21	0–1	Louisiana Superdome	58,673
2	September 19	at Chicago Bears	**W** 10–0	1–1	Soldier Field	56,600
–	September 26	Denver Broncos	canceled	1–1	Louisiana Superdome	1982 NFL players strike
–	October 3	at Los Angeles Raiders	canceled	1–1	Los Angeles Memorial Coliseum	1982 NFL players strike
–	October 10	**San Francisco 49ers**	canceled	1–1	Louisiana Superdome	1982 NFL players strike
–	October 17	at Minnesota Vikings	canceled	1–1	Hubert H. Humphrey Metrodome	1982 NFL players strike
–	October 24	at **Los Angeles Rams**	canceled	1–1	Anaheim Stadium	1982 NFL players strike
–	October 31	**Atlanta Falcons**	postponed	1–1	Louisiana Superdome	1982 NFL players strike
–	November 7	**Los Angeles Rams**	canceled	1–1	Louisiana Superdome	1982 NFL players strike
–	November 14	at San Diego Chargers	canceled	1–1	Jack Murphy Stadium	1982 NFL players strike
3	November 21	Kansas City Chiefs	**W** 27–17	2–1	Louisiana Superdome	39,341
4	November 28	at **San Francisco 49ers**	**W** 23–20	3–1	Candlestick Park	51,611
5	December 5	Tampa Bay Buccaneers	**L** 10–13	3–2	Louisiana Superdome	61,709
6	December 12	at **Atlanta Falcons**	**L** 0–35	3–3	Atlanta–Fulton County Stadium	39,535
7	December 19	at Dallas Cowboys	**L** 7–21	3–4	Texas Stadium	64,506
8	December 26	Washington Redskins	**L** 10–27	3–5	Louisiana Superdome	48,667
9	January 2, 1983	**Atlanta Falcons**	**W** 35–6	4–5	Louisiana Superdome	47,336
Note: Intra-division opponents are in **bold** text.

== Standings ==
NFC West
	W	L	T	PCT	DIV	CONF	PF	PA	STK
^{(5)} Atlanta Falcons	5	4	0	.556	3–1	4–3	183	199	L2
New Orleans Saints	4	5	0	.444	2–1	3–5	129	160	W1
San Francisco 49ers	3	6	0	.333	1–3	2–3	209	206	L1
Los Angeles Rams	2	7	0	.222	1–2	1–5	200	250	W1

NFC
#	Team	W	L	T	PCT	PF	PA	STK
Seeded postseason qualifiers
1	Washington Redskins	8	1	0	.889	190	128	W4
2	Dallas Cowboys	6	3	0	.667	226	145	L2
3	Green Bay Packers	5	3	1	.611	226	169	L1
4 (Note: Minnesota (4–1), Atlanta (4–3), St. Louis (5–4), Tampa Bay (3–3) seeds were determined by best won-lost record in conference games.)	Minnesota Vikings	5	4	0	.556	187	198	W1
5	Atlanta Falcons	5	4	0	.556	183	199	L2
6	St. Louis Cardinals	5	4	0	.556	135	170	L1
7	Tampa Bay Buccaneers	5	4	0	.556	158	178	W3
8 (Note: Detroit finished ahead of New Orleans and the N.Y. Giants based on best conference record (4–4 to Saints’ 3–5 to Giants’ 3–5).)	Detroit Lions	4	5	0	.444	181	176	W1
Did not qualify for the postseason
9	New Orleans Saints	4	5	0	.444	129	160	W1
10	New York Giants	4	5	0	.444	164	160	W1
11 (Note: San Francisco finished ahead of Chicago, and Chicago finished ahead of Philadelphia, based on conference record (49ers’ 2–3 to Bears’ 2–5 to Eagles’ 1–5).)	San Francisco 49ers	3	6	0	.333	209	206	L1
12	Chicago Bears	3	6	0	.333	141	174	L1
13	Philadelphia Eagles	3	6	0	.333	191	195	L1
14	Los Angeles Rams	2	7	0	.222	200	250	W1
Tiebreakers
