= 1978 New Orleans Saints season =

NFL team season

- Head coach: Dick Nolan

Results
- Record: 7–9
- Division place: 3rd NFC West
- Playoffs: Did not qualify
- Pro Bowlers: QB Archie Manning

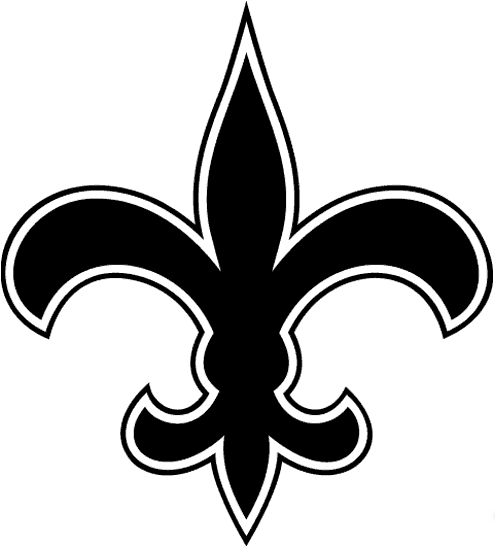
New Orleans Saints' Fleur-de-lis logo from 1967 to 1999.

The 1978 New Orleans Saints season was the Saints’ twelfth season. Quarterback Archie Manning put together one of his finest seasons, earning the NFC Player of the Year award and becoming the Saints’ first Pro Bowl representative since the NFL–AFL merger as the Saints finished with a franchise-best 7–9 mark under new head coach Dick Nolan. Seven of the Saints’ losses came against teams that qualified for the playoffs (including both Super Bowl XIII teams, the Pittsburgh Steelers and the Dallas Cowboys), whilst all nine losses came against teams who finished at or above .500.

== Offseason ==
- On August 5, the NFL played its first game in Mexico City. The Saints beat the Philadelphia Eagles by a score of 14–7.

=== NFL draft ===
1978 New Orleans Saints draft
Round	Pick	Player	Position	College	Notes
1	3	Wes Chandler *	Wide receiver	Florida	
2	33	James Taylor	Offensive tackle	Missouri	
3	60	Barry Bennett	Defensive tackle	Concordia College	
4	87	Don Schwartz	Defensive back	Washington State	
5	115	Eric Felton	Defensive back	Texas Tech	
6	142	Mike Rieker	Quarterback	Lehigh	
6	157	Francis Chesley	Linebacker	Wyoming	
8	199	Brooks Williams	Tight end	North Carolina	
9	226	Richard Carter	Defensive back	North Carolina State	
11	283	Nathan Besaint	Defensive tackle	Southern	
11	285	Dave Riley	Running back	West Virginia	
12	310	Larry Hardy	Tight end	Jackson State	
Made roster * Made at least one Pro Bowl during career

=== Undrafted free agents ===
1978 undrafted free agents of note
Player	Position	College
Ed Burns	Quarterback	Nebraska
Jimmy Dan Elzner	Quarterback	TCU
Jack Henderson	Quarterback	Oregon
Chris Matthiesen	Guard	Wisconsin–Stevens Point
Rusty Rebowe	Linebacker	Nicholls State
Bobby Smithart	Defensive End	Southern Miss

== Personnel ==
=== Staff ===
1978 New Orleans Saints staff
Front office: President – John W. Mecom Jr.; Executive Vice President – Eddie Jones; Vice President of Player Personnel – Harry Hulmes; Head coaches: Head Coach – Dick Nolan; Offensive coaches: Offensive Coordinator – Ed Hughes; Quarterbacks/Receivers – Lamar McHan; Offensive Line – Dick Stanfel	Defensive coaches: Defensive Coordinator – Paul Wiggin; Defensive Line – Tom Pratt; Linebackers – Ed Beard; Defensive Backs – Chet Franklin; Special teams coaches: Special Teams – Whitey Campbell; Strength and conditioning: Conditioning – Bob Hill

=== Roster ===
1978 New Orleans Saints roster
Quarterbacks (QB): 11 Ed Burns; 8 Archie Manning; 12 Bobby Scott; Running backs (RB): 34 Tony Galbreath; 45 Jack Holmes; 32 Kim Jones; 42 Chuck Muncie; 33 Mike Strachan; Wide receivers (WR): 89 Wes Chandler; 82 Ike Harris; 83 Tinker Owens; 84 Rich Mauti; Tight ends (TE): 85 Henry Childs; 87 Larry Hardy; 88 Brooks Williams	Offensive linemen (OL): 69 Bill Fifer G; 62 John Hill C; 76 Kevin Hunt T; 64 Dave Lafary G; 70 Mark Meseroll T; 68 Fred Sturt G; 71 J. T. Taylor T; 65 Robert Woods T; Defensive linemen (DL): 63 Barry Bennett DT; 73 Joe Campbell DE; 72 Mike Fultz DT; 78 Elois Grooms DE; 74 Derland Moore DT; 75 Elex Price DT; 60 Don Reese DE	Linebackers (LB): 51 Ron Crosby OLB; 58 Joe Federspiel MLB; 54 Pat Hughes OLB; 57 Jim Merlo OLB; 55 Floyd Rice OLB; 52 Skip Vanderbundt OLB; Defensive backs (DB): 27 Ray Brown SS; 24 Clarence Chapman CB; 20 Eric Felton CB; 49 Ralph McGill FS; 37 Tom Myers FS; 48 Don Schwartz SS; 29 Mo Spencer CB; Special teams (ST): 16 Tom Blanchard P; 10 Steve Mike-Mayer K	Reserve: 77 Gary Anderson G (IR); 50 Ken Bordelon LB (IR); 66 Conrad Dobler G (IR); 53 Rick Kingrea LB (IR); 56 Rusty Rebowe LB (IR); 26 Jimmy Stewart S (IR); 15 Rich Szaro K (IR); 35 Jim Van Wagner RB (IR); 67 John Watson T (IR); 61 Mike Watson T (IR); 79 Emanuel Zanders G (IR); Rookies in italics

== Regular season ==
=== Schedule ===
Week	Date	Opponent	Result	Record	Venue	Attendance
1	September 3	Minnesota Vikings	**W** 31–24	1–0	Louisiana Superdome	54,187
2	September 10	at Green Bay Packers	**L** 17–28	1–1	Milwaukee County Stadium	54,336
3	September 17	Philadelphia Eagles	**L** 17–24	1–2	Louisiana Superdome	49,242
4	September 24	at Cincinnati Bengals	**W** 20–18	2–2	Riverfront Stadium	40,455
5	October 1	**Los Angeles Rams**	**L** 20–26	2–3	Louisiana Superdome	61,659
6	October 8	Cleveland Browns	**L** 16–24	2–4	Louisiana Superdome	50,158
7	October 15	at **San Francisco 49ers**	**W** 14–7	3–4	Candlestick Park	37,671
8	October 22	at **Los Angeles Rams**	**W** 10–3	4–4	Los Angeles Memorial Coliseum	47,574
9	October 29	New York Giants	**W** 28–17	5–4	Louisiana Superdome	59,807
10	November 5	at Pittsburgh Steelers	**L** 14–20	5–5	Three Rivers Stadium	48,526
11	November 12	**Atlanta Falcons**	**L** 17–20	5–6	Louisiana Superdome	70,323
12	November 19	at Dallas Cowboys	**L** 7–27	5–7	Texas Stadium	57,920
13	November 26	at **Atlanta Falcons**	**L** 17–20	5–8	Atlanta–Fulton County Stadium	55,121
14	December 3	**San Francisco 49ers**	**W** 24–13	6–8	Louisiana Superdome	50,068
15	December 10	Houston Oilers	**L** 12–17	6–9	Louisiana Superdome	63,169
16	December 17	at Tampa Bay Buccaneers	**W** 17–10	7–9	Tampa Stadium	51,207
Note: Intra-division opponents are in **bold** text.

=== Standings ===
NFC West
	W	L	T	PCT	DIV	CONF	PF	PA	STK
Los Angeles Rams^{(1)}	12	4	0	.750	4–2	10–2	316	245	W1
Atlanta Falcons^{(4)}	9	7	0	.563	5–1	8–4	240	290	L1
New Orleans Saints	7	9	0	.438	3–3	6–6	281	298	W1
San Francisco 49ers	2	14	0	.125	0–6	1–11	219	350	L1
