= Russell Erxleben =

American football player (born 1957)

No. 14, 15
- Positions: Punter, kicker

Personal information
- Born: January 13, 1957 (age 69); Seguin, Texas, U.S.
- Listed height: 6 ft 4 in (1.93 m)
- Listed weight: 223 lb (101 kg)

Career information
- High school: Seguin
- College: Texas
- NFL draft: 1979: 1st round, 11th overall pick

Career history
- New Orleans Saints (1979–1983); Detroit Lions (1987)

Awards and highlights
- 3× First-team All-American (1976–1978); 4× First-team All-SWC (1975, 1976, 1977, 1978); NCAA record: Longest field goal made: 67 yards (tied) (Note: Kicked with tee) (Note: Also tied with Tom Odle from Fort Hays State (Division II))

Career NFL statistics
- Punts: 280
- Punting yards: 11,381
- Punting yards average: 40.6
- Longest punt: 60
- Field goals attempted: 8
- Field goals made: 4
- Field goal %: 50.0%
- Longest field goal: 38 yards
- Stats at Pro Football Reference

Russell Erxleben (born January 13, 1957) is an American former professional football player and investor. A highly decorated college kicker for the University of Texas, Erxleben was a three-time All-American punter (1976, 1977, and 1978) and set the record for the longest successful field goal in NCAA history at 67 yards, which is still tied today. He was unexpectedly selected by the New Orleans Saints in the first round (11th overall pick) of the 1979 NFL draft as a combination kicker and punter, where he remains the highest drafted punter and the second highest kicker in NFL history. Erxleben only spent six years in the NFL and was widely described as one of the Saints' biggest draft busts. He later became a currency investor, and was convicted of securities fraud in 1999. Although he was released in 2005, he was once again convicted of investment fraud in 2014 and sentenced to 90 months (7 1/2 years) in federal prison.

== Early life ==
Erxleben was raised in the small city of Seguin, Texas, located about 35 miles (55 km) east of San Antonio, and was a multi-sport athlete in his youth. He'd later focus his attention on football, where he became the starting quarterback, kicker, and punter for Seguin High School. He was soon recognized by recruiters for his kicking abilities and exceptional leg strength, having a conventional straight-on kicking style using a two-step approach. He entered the University of Texas as a top prospect in 1975.

== College career ==
Erxleben quickly earned a reputation as a reliable kicker for the Texas Longhorns. In December of his freshman year, he played in the Bluebonnet Bowl against Colorado. Despite early troubles in the game, including a missed field goal and a blocked extra point, Erxleben kicked a field goal late in the game, breaking the tie and securing the win for Texas.

In 1977, in a game against Rice University, he set the record for the longest field goal in NCAA history with a 67-yard kick (with tee). UT head coach Fred Akers said of the kick, "It was like a gunshot. We couldn't believe a ball was going that far. It had another eight yards on it." Erxleben kicked two other field goals over 60 yards that season. Rule changes in NCAA football since 1977, specifically the prohibition of kicking tees for field goals, as well as changes to the placement of the ball following a failed kick, have discouraged such long attempts, thus attempts to break the record are now rare. The longest field goal since the rule changes came in 1998 when Martin Gramatica of Kansas State made a 65-yard attempt.

Erxleben is the only three-time All-American punter in NCAA history, being a consensus choice in 1976, 1977, and 1978. He completed his college career with 44 games played for 39 out of 65 field goals made (60% FG%), 83 out of 90 extra point kicks made (92% XP%), and 165 total punts for 7,740 yards.

== Professional playing career ==
In 1979, Erxleben was drafted in the first round (11th pick overall) by the New Orleans Saints, listed as both a kicker and a punter. He is still the highest drafted punter of all time (although Ray Guy would be the highest drafted pure punter), and the second highest drafted kicker behind Charlie Gogolak in 1966. This was also the second consecutive year a kicker/punter went in the 1st round, after the St. Louis Cardinals took Steve Little 15th overall in 1978. The Saints and new head coach Dick Nolan had gone through a number of kicking troubles during the 1978 season, and while the team had landed solid veterans in both positions (Rich Szaro at placekicker and Tom Blanchard at punter) by the end of the year, Nolan hoped to save a roster spot by having Erxleben perform both the place-kicking and punting duties.

During Erxleben's NFL debut on September 2, 1979, the Saints and arch-rival Atlanta Falcons went into overtime tied at 34–34. Midway through overtime, a snap went over Erxleben's head and rolled to the goal line. Erxleben picked the ball up and made a hurried chest pass which was immediately intercepted by Atlanta's James Mayberry at the 6-yard line, who trotted into the end zone for a touchdown and led to a 40–34 Falcon victory. The next week in Milwaukee, Erxleben pulled his groin, forcing the Saints to use fullback Tony Galbreath as their emergency placekicker and wide receiver Wes Chandler at punter against the Green Bay Packers. The Saints lost 28–19, and Erxleben had to be placed on injured reserve for the remainder of his rookie season. Nolan was forced to sign Garo Yepremian and Rick Partridge to handle the kicking/punting chores in Erxleben's extended absence. New Orleans finished the year at 8–8, one game behind the Los Angeles Rams, who won the division and played in Super Bowl XIV.

Following his disappointing rookie season, Erxleben missed a game-tying field goal attempt in the 1980 season opener, resulting in a 26–23 loss to the San Francisco 49ers, a team that had won a total of four games over the previous two seasons. The loss was the first of 14 consecutive defeats for the Saints, who ultimately ended the year 1–15. After a poor kicking performance in the first two games of the season, Erxleben would resign from placekicking duties, and continued his career for the Saints exclusively as an average punter.

Erxleben was New Orleans' union representative during the 1982 NFL players' strike.

In 1982, the Saints drafted Morten Andersen, who would be the team's placekicker for the next 13 seasons. The Saints released Erxleben in 1984 after drafting his replacement, Brian Hansen. After four years out of football, he attempted a comeback with the Detroit Lions in 1987, but only played one game and retired for good the following year. He played six total seasons in the NFL, most of them as punter. He ended his career with 280 total punts for 11,381 yards, and only 8 field goal attempts with a 50% completion rate. He did not make the Pro Bowl during his NFL career. Due to his unprecedentedly high draft position, underwhelming performance compared to college, and injuries, Erxleben is often listed as one of the Saints' biggest draft busts.

== NFL career statistics ==
Legend
**Bold**	Career high

Year	Team	Punting										Field Goals				PATs		
Year	Team	GP	Punts	Yds	Net Yds	Lng	Avg	Net Avg	Blk	Ins20	TB	FGM	FGA	Lng	FG%	XPM	XPA	XP%
1979	NOR	1	4	148	126	40	37.0	31.5	0	1	0	**2**	2	**38**	**100.0%**	**4**	**4**	**100.0%**
1980	NOR	**16**	**89**	**3,499**	**2,949**	57	39.3	33.1	0	**23**	3	**2**	**5**	37	40.0%	2	2	100.0%
1981	NOR	**16**	66	2,672	2,270	**60**	40.5	34.4	0	11	6	—	—	—	—	—	—	—
1982	NOR	9	46	1,976	1,617	60	**43.0**	**35.2**	0	6	6	0	1	0	0.0%	1	1	100.0%
1983	NOR	**16**	74	3,034	2,283	60	41.0	30.9	0	10	**9**	—	—	—	—	—	—	—
1987	DET	1	1	52	52	52	52	52	0	0	0	—	—	—	—	—	—	—
Career		59	280	11,381	9,287	60	40.6	33.2	0	51	24	4	8	38	50.0%	7	7	100.0%

== Legal issues ==
After retiring from the NFL, Erxleben became a financial investor in foreign exchange trading, founding Austin Forex International in Austin, Texas. In 1999, following a tip, an investigation by the Texas State Securities Board and the Internal Revenue Service ensued; and Erxleben eventually pleaded guilty to one count of conspiracy to commit securities fraud, mail fraud and money laundering, and a second count for securities fraud in connection with misleading statements regarding the past performance of Austin Forex. On September 18, 2000, Erxleben was sentenced by United States District Court Judge James R. Nowlin to 84 months in prison and ordered to pay a total of $28 million in restitution with a $1 million fine. Erxleben's lawyers, the law firm of Locke, Liddell & Sapp, settled a related lawsuit for $22 million in 2000. Other law firms settled and a total of $34 million was collected in the combined suits.

On January 24, 2013, Erxleben was arrested again on various federal charges related to an alleged Ponzi scheme. In December 2013 Erxleben pleaded guilty to charges of wire fraud and money laundering. On February 24, 2014, he was sentenced to 90 months in prison. Erxleben was released from custody on July 19, 2019.

== See also ==
- List of Texas Longhorns football All-Americans
- List of New Orleans Saints first-round draft picks
