= List of New Orleans Saints first-round draft picks =

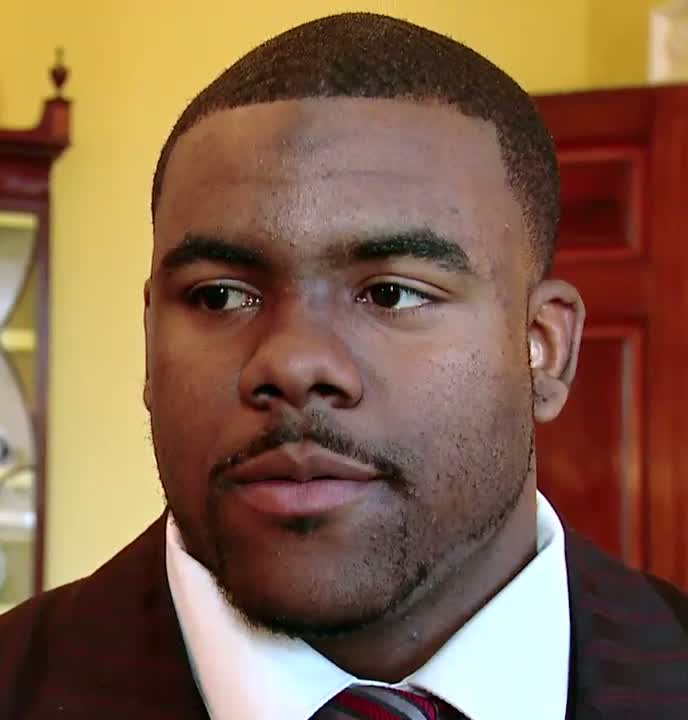
Mark Ingram II, one of the Saints' two first-round draft picks in 2011

The New Orleans Saints joined the National Football League (NFL) as an expansion team in 1967 and first participated in the 1967 NFL Annual Player Selection Meeting, more commonly known as the NFL draft. In the NFL Draft, each NFL franchise annually seeks to add new players to its roster. Teams are ranked in inverse order based on the previous season's record, with the worst record picking first, and the second-worst picking second and so on. The team which wins the Super Bowl receives the last pick in the subsequent Draft, with the penultimate pick going to the losing team. Teams have the option of trading away their picks to other teams for different picks, players, cash, or a combination thereof. Thus, it is not uncommon for a team's actual draft pick to differ from their assigned draft pick, or for a team to have extra or no draft picks in any round due to these trades.

In the 1967 NFL Draft, the Saints had two first-round picks; first and last. They traded away the first overall pick to the Baltimore Colts, while with the 26th pick, they selected Leslie Kelley, a running back from Alabama. The Saints have selected first overall once, drafting George Rogers in 1981, second overall twice, drafting Archie Manning in 1971 and Reggie Bush in 2006, and third overall once, drafting Wes Chandler in 1978. The team's most recent first-round selection was wide receiver Jordyn Tyson in 2026 NFL draft.

== Key ==
Table key
^	Indicates the player was inducted into the Pro Football Hall of Fame.
*	Selected number one overall
†	Indicates the player was selected for the Pro Bowl at any time in their career.
—	The Saints did not draft a player in the first round that year.
Year	Each year links to an article about that particular NFL Draft.
Pick	Indicates the number of the pick within the first round
Position	Indicates the position of the player in the NFL
College	The player's college football team

== Player selections ==
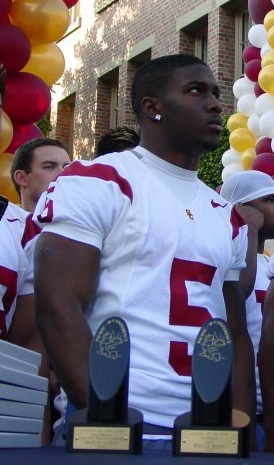
Reggie Bush, the Saints first-round draft pick in 2006

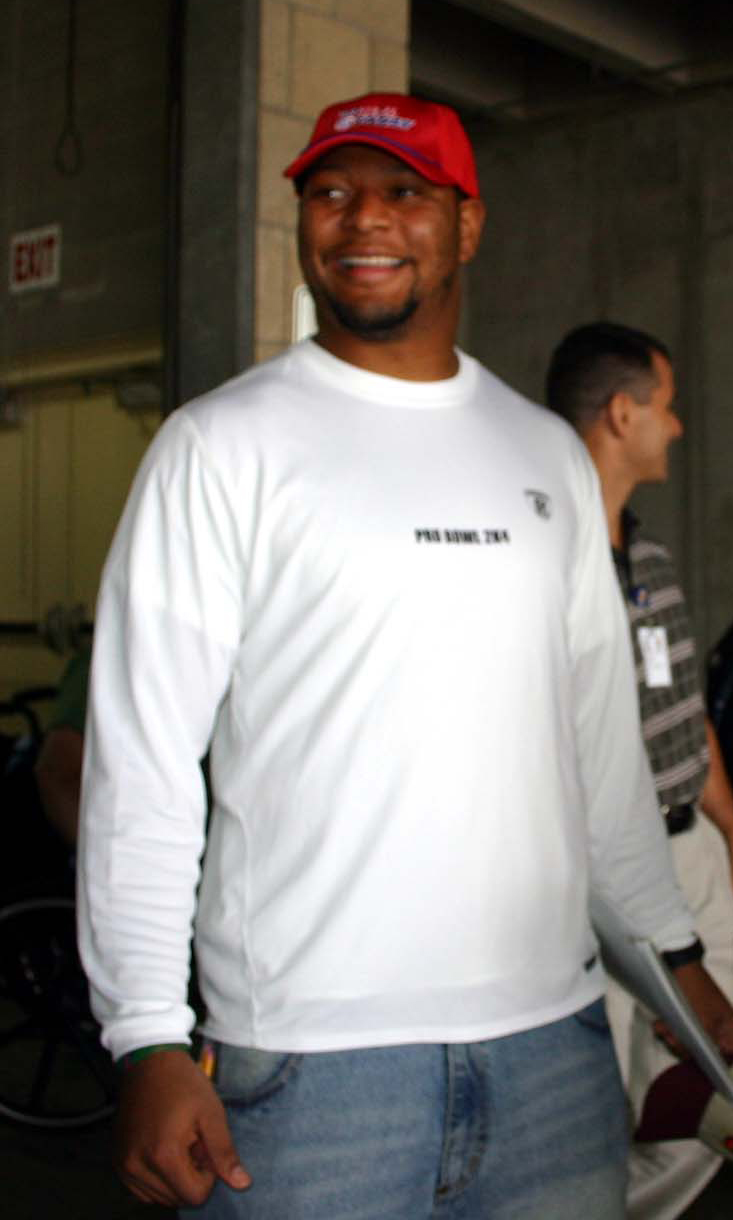
Deuce McAllister, a 2001 first-round pick

New Orleans Saints first-round draft picks
Year	Pick	Player name	Position	College	Notes
1967	26	Leslie Kelley	Running back	Alabama	(Note: The Saints traded their #1 overall pick to the Baltimore Colts for Gary Cuozzo. The #26 pick still remained in their possession.)
1968	7	Kevin Hardy	Defensive end	Notre Dame	(Note: The Saints traded their #5 overall pick to the Green Bay Packers and acquired this pick from the Minnesota Vikings.)
1969	17	John Shinners	Guard	Xavier	(Note: The Saints traded their #7 overall pick to the San Francisco 49ers and acquired this pick from the Minnesota Vikings.)
1970	10	Ken Burrough †	Wide receiver	Texas Southern	
1971	2	Archie Manning †	Quarterback	Mississippi	
1972	8	Royce Smith	Guard	Georgia	
1973	—	No pick	—	—	(Note: The Saints traded their #2 overall pick to the Baltimore Colts.)
1974	13	Rick Middleton	Linebacker	Ohio State	(Note: The Saints acquired this pick from the Detroit Lions.)
1975	7	Larry Burton	Wide receiver	Purdue	
1975	12	Kurt Schumacher	Offensive tackle	Ohio State	(Note: The Saints acquired this pick from the New York Jets.)
1976	3	Chuck Muncie †	Running back	California	
1977	7	Joe Campbell	Defensive end	Maryland	
1978	3	Wes Chandler †	Wide receiver	Florida	
1979	11	Russell Erxleben	Placekicker	Texas	
1980	12	Stan Brock	Offensive tackle	Colorado	
1981	1	George Rogers *†	Running back	South Carolina	
1982	13	Lindsay Scott	Wide receiver	Georgia	(Note: The Saints relinquished their 1st round pick after taking a supplemental pick in 1981. They acquired this pick from the Green Bay Packers.)
1983	—	No pick	—	—	(Note: The Saints traded their #11 overall pick to the Green Bay Packers.)
1984	—	No pick	—	—	(Note: The Saints traded their #15 overall pick to the New York Jets.)
1985	24	Alvin Toles	Linebacker	Tennessee	(Note: The Saints traded their #11 overall pick to the Houston Oilers and acquired the #24 overall pick from the Washington Redskins.)
1986	6	Jim Dombrowski	Offensive tackle	Virginia	(Note: The Saints traded their #4 overall pick to the Baltimore Colts for this pick.)
1987	11	Shawn Knight	Defensive tackle	Brigham Young	
1988	24	Craig Heyward †	Running back	Pittsburgh	
1989	19	Wayne Martin †	Defensive end	Arkansas	
1990	14	Renaldo Turnbull †	Defensive end	West Virginia	
1991	—	No pick	—	—	(Note: The Saints traded their #14 overall pick to the Dallas Cowboys.)
1992	21	Vaughn Dunbar	Running back	Indiana	
1993	8	Willie Roaf ^	Offensive tackle	Louisiana Tech	(Note: The Saints acquired this pick from the Detroit Lions.)
1993	20	Irv Smith	Tight end	Notre Dame	(Note: The Saints acquired this pick from the San Francisco 49ers.)
1994	13	Joe Johnson †	Defensive end	Louisville	(Note: The Saints acquired this pick from the New York Jets.)
1995	13	Mark Fields	Linebacker	Washington State	
1996	11	Alex Molden	Defensive back	Oregon	
1997	10	Chris Naeole	Guard	Colorado	(Note: The Saints acquired this pick from the Oakland Raiders.)
1998	7	Kyle Turley †	Offensive tackle	San Diego State	
1999	5	Ricky Williams †	Running back	Texas	(Note: The Saints traded their #12 overall pick to the Washington Redskins as well as their 3rd, 4th, 5th, 6th and 7th round picks, and their 1st and 3rd round picks in 2000 for a 1st round pick in 1999.)
2000	—	No pick	—	—	
2001	23	Deuce McAllister †	Running back	Mississippi	
2002	13	Donté Stallworth	Wide receiver	Tennessee	
2002	25	Charles Grant	Defensive end	Georgia	(Note: The Saints acquired this pick from the Miami Dolphins as well as a 4th round pick and a 1st round pick (#18) in 2003, for Ricky Williams and a 3rd round pick.)
2003	6	Johnathan Sullivan	Defensive tackle	Georgia	(Note: The Saints acquired this pick from the Arizona Cardinals along with a 2nd and 4th round picks, for their #17 and #18 overall picks and a 2nd round pick.)
2004	18	Will Smith †	Defensive end	Ohio State	
2005	13	Jammal Brown †	Offensive tackle	Oklahoma	(Note: The Saints traded their #16 overall pick to the Houston Texans as well as a 3rd round pick in 2006 for this pick.)
2006	2	Reggie Bush	Running back	Southern California	
2007	27	Robert Meachem	Wide receiver	Tennessee	
2008	7	Sedrick Ellis	Defensive tackle	Southern California	(Note: The Saints traded their #10 overall pick to the New England Patriots as well as a 3rd round pick for this pick and a 5th round pick.)
2009	14	Malcolm Jenkins †	Defensive back	Ohio State	
2010	32	Patrick Robinson	Cornerback	Florida State	
2011	24	Cameron Jordan †	Defensive end	California	
2011	28	Mark Ingram II †	Running back	Alabama	(Note: The Saints acquired a 1st round pick in 2011 from the New England Patriots for a 2nd round pick and a 1st round pick in 2012.)
2012	—	No pick	—	—	
2013	15	Kenny Vaccaro	Strong safety	Texas	
2014	20	Brandin Cooks	Wide receiver	Oregon State	(Note: The Saints acquired this pick from the Arizona Cardinals in exchange for their first and third round picks (27th & 91st).)
2015	13	Andrus Peat †	Offensive tackle	Stanford	
2015	31	Stephone Anthony	Linebacker	Clemson	(Note: The Saints acquired this pick and center Max Unger from the Seattle Seahawks in exchange for their fourth round selection (112th) and tight end Jimmy Graham.)
2016	12	Sheldon Rankins	Defensive tackle	Louisville	
2017	11	Marshon Lattimore †	Cornerback	Ohio State	
2017	32	Ryan Ramczyk	Offensive tackle	Wisconsin	(Note: The Saints acquired this (32nd) and third-round (103rd) picks from the New England Patriots in exchange for their fourth-round selection (118th) and wide receiver Brandin Cooks.)
2018	14	Marcus Davenport	Defensive end	UTSA	(Note: The Saints acquired this pick from the Green Bay Packers in exchange for their first- and fifth-round selections (27th and 147th) and a first-round selection in 2019.)
2019	—	No pick	—	—	
2020	24	Cesar Ruiz	Center	Michigan	
2021	28	Payton Turner	Defensive end	Houston	
2022	11	Chris Olave	Wide receiver	Ohio State	
2022	19	Trevor Penning	Offensive tackle	Northern Iowa	
2023	29	Bryan Bresee	Defensive tackle	Clemson	
2024	14	Taliese Fuaga	Offensive tackle	Oregon State	
2025	9	Kelvin Banks Jr.	Offensive tackle	Texas	
2026	8	Jordyn Tyson	Wide receiver	Arizona State	
