= Ike Harris =

American football player (born 1952)

No. 84, 82
- Position: Wide receiver

Personal information
- Born: November 27, 1952 (age 73); West Memphis, Arkansas, U.S.
- Listed height: 6 ft 3 in (1.91 m)
- Listed weight: 210 lb (95 kg)

Career information
- High school: West Memphis
- College: Iowa State
- NFL draft: 1974: 4th round, 91st overall pick

Career history
- Southern California Sun (1974); St. Louis Cardinals (1975–1977); New Orleans Saints (1978–1981)

Career NFL statistics
- Receptions: 211
- Receiving yards: 3,305
- Receiving TDs: 16
- Stats at Pro Football Reference

Isaiah "Ike" Harris (born November 27, 1952) is an American former professional football player who was a wide receiver in the National Football League (NFL) for the St. Louis Cardinals (1975–77) and the New Orleans Saints (1978–81).

Harris played college football for Iowa State Cyclones. In 1974, he played for the Southern California Sun of the World Football League (WFL). He next joined the NFL, where he caught 211 passes in his career for 16 touchdowns.

Harris was President of BellSouth Enterprises and was named one of the 75 Most Powerful African-Americans in Corporate America by Black Enterprise Magazine.

Harris has been a member of the board of directors of CIGNA Corporation since 2005, and has been named to take over as non-executive chairman of the board on January 1, 2010.

== NFL career statistics ==
Legend
**Bold**	Career high

=== Regular season ===
Year	Team	Games		Receiving				
Year	Team	GP	GS	Rec	Yds	Avg	Lng	TD
1975	STL	14	5	15	266	17.7	36	0
1976	STL	12	12	**52**	**782**	15.0	40	1
1977	STL	14	14	40	547	13.7	38	3
1978	NOR	15	15	40	590	14.8	**45**	4
1979	NOR	14	14	25	395	15.8	42	2
1980	NOR	16	16	37	692	**18.7**	44	**6**
1981	NOR	3	3	2	33	16.5	20	0
		88	79	211	3,305	15.7	45	16

=== Postseason ===
Year	Team	Games		Receiving				
Year	Team	GP	GS	Rec	Yds	Avg	Lng	TD
1975	STL	1	0	2	33	16.5	22	0
		1	0	2	33	16.5	22	0
