= Toussaint Tyler =

American football player (born 1959)

No. 42
- Position: Running back

Personal information
- Born: March 19, 1959 (age 67); Barstow, California, U.S.
- Listed height: 6 ft 2 in (1.88 m)
- Listed weight: 220 lb (100 kg)

Career information
- High school: El Camino (Oceanside, California)
- College: Washington
- NFL draft: 1981: 9th round, 222nd overall pick

Career history
- New Orleans Saints (1981–1982)

Awards and highlights
- Second-team All-Pac-10 (1980)

Career NFL statistics
- Rushing yards: 204
- Rushing average: 4.4
- Receptions: 27
- Receiving yards: 166
- Stats at Pro Football Reference

Toussaint L'Ouverture Tyler (first name pronounced "Too-San", born March 19, 1959) is a former running back in the National Football League (NFL). He played with New Orleans Saints in 1981 and 1982.

Born in Barstow, California, Tyler moved to Oceanside where he starred as halfback at El Camino High School. After receiving a number of awards following his senior season, he was recruited to the University of Washington, where he played mainly as a fullback. In his freshman season of 1977, the Huskies won the Rose Bowl, and he started for the first time in a game the following season, and took a larger role in his junior year in 1979 as the team went 10–2 and won the Sun Bowl.

Early in Tyler's senior season in 1980, injuries to the Huskies' halfbacks prompted head coach Don James to move him there from fullback. Washington finished 9–2 in the regular season and won the Pac-10 title, earning them a trip to the Rose Bowl against the Michigan Wolverines. With the score tied at zero in the first quarter, Tyler fumbled at the one-yard line; Michigan went on to win the game 23–6.

Tyler was selected 222nd overall (first in the ninth round) in the 1981 NFL draft by the New Orleans Saints. He played two seasons with the Saints, appearing in all 23 games over those two seasons. Before the 1983 NFL season, the Saints cut him in order to meet the limit on how many players a team may have. He then went on to a short stint with the Oakland Invaders in the USFL, and then tried to make the Minnesota Vikings. He now lives in Kent, Washington, where he works as a juvenile detention officer.

== Early life ==
Born on March 19, 1959, Tyler was named after the 18th-century Haitian leader Toussaint Louverture. His mother was a seamstress and his father, Walter, was a boxing trainer who handled, among others, heavyweight champion Mike Weaver. The running back later said "My father tried to interest me in boxing but I wasn't into getting smacked in the face." Tyler, along with two brothers and four sisters, lived in Barstow, California until he was in seventh grade. His parents then divorced and he went to live with his mother in Oceanside, California.

In Oceanside, he played at El Camino High School under coach Herb Meyer. Rushing for 1,732 yards with an eight yards-per-carry average in his senior season, the halfback drew comparisons to fellow El Camino back C. R. Roberts. The El Camino team won the California Interscholastic Federation (CIF) district title in 1976. One of six Californians named to that year's All-American high school football team by Scholastic Coach, a magazine for athletic directors and coaches, he was San Diego County's player of the year and shared CIF (San Diego Section) player of the year honors with offensive tackle Curt Marsh. Both players were considered blue-chip recruits and went to the University of Washington.

== College career ==
At Washington, Tyler was converted from halfback to fullback. Because of this, Tyler needed to learn how to block, a transition in which he said he "pinched a lot of nerves and got a lot of stiff necks". When asked during his senior year at Washington which position he prefers, Tyler responded "I love tailback, but I'll play any position to help our team." Tyler finished third in a pre-season poll of sportswriters predicting the conference's offensive rookie of the year. In Tyler's freshman year, the 1977 Washington Huskies finished with nine wins and two losses in the regular season. In his first collegiate contest, Tyler rushed for 70 yards on seven carries in a victory against San Jose State University. In a game against the California Golden Bears, then ranked 17th in the AP Poll, Tyler scored a touchdown to help the team win 50–31, giving them a record of 4–1, tying them with two other teams for the lead in the Pacific-10 Conference. They then won the 1978 Rose Bowl 27–20 over the Michigan Wolverines.

The following season, Tyler started at fullback for the first time in a game against Oregon State, winless at the time, and rushed for 151 yards, including a 55-yard fourth-quarter touchdown, to lead the Huskies to a 20–14 victory. In the team's next game, the back scored twice as Washington beat twelfth-ranked Arizona State. The Huskies finished with seven wins and four losses, missing a bowl game. Tyler averaged 5.5 yards a carry in the 1978 season.

To begin 1979, Washington won 38–2 and 41–7 against non-conference opponents, with Tyler scoring once in both games and averaging 8.2 yards per carry. In their conference opener the next week, the Huskies won on a late-fourth-quarter punt return touchdown from Mark Lee, Lee's first ever punt return; Tyler gained 81 yards over 16 rushing attempts. The winning continued for two games, with Tyler scoring from three yards in both. Called "one of the Pac-10's most under-rated players", the back now needed 65 yards to tie Credell Green for tenth on Washington's list of career rushing yards leaders. The now twelfth-ranked Huskies lost their next two games, to Arizona and the Pittsburgh Panthers. To conclude the season, Washington, then number 13, upset the Texas Longhorns 14–7 with Tyler rushing 19 times for 70 yards.

Going into his senior season, Tyler, wearing a jersey number of 45, was the school's seventh leading rusher. Tyler was moved to halfback early in the season after the Huskies' third-string halfback was injured. Washington won 50–7 and 45–7 in games against Air Force and Northwestern; in the second game, Tyler scored from one, three, and six yards in the first quarter. After splitting their next two games, the back scored twice from nine yards to help the Huskies beat Oregon State 41–6. At this point, Tyler was third in the conference with 49 points scored and fourth with 446 yards rushing. Washington then beat Stanford 27–24; during the game, Tyler injured a tendon in his right knee, leading to him being used sparsely in the final four regular season games. After a 24–10 loss to Navy in which head coach Don James said Washington was "embarrassed", the Huskies were 5–2 (2–1 in the Pacific-10 Conference) and still top contenders for a Rose Bowl appearance.

The Huskies proceeded to win 25–0 over Arizona State and 45–22 against the University of Arizona Wildcats, with Tyler scoring once in each game. Washington, although unranked at 7–2, was leading in the race for the Pac-10 spot in the Rose Bowl. Only four other teams in the conference were eligible for the appearance, as, in the previous August, the presidents of Pac-10 schools had voted unanimously to disqualify half of the conference's members from Rose Bowl contention because of rules violations. The teams disqualified included UCLA and USC, two of the league's strongest teams. The next week, despite not having Tyler due to injury, Washington beat USC 20–10; this clinched a spot in Rose Bowl on New Year's Day. In the 1981 Rose Bowl against the Michigan Wolverines, Washington was beaten 23–6. In a scoreless first quarter, it was originally ruled a touchdown when Tyler dove over a pile near the goal line. After the officials conferred, however, it was decided that Tyler had fumbled at the one-yard line, which he later admitted to.

Tyler, nicknamed "Tudy" in college, was a muscular 6⅓ feet and 215 pounds. He ran the 40-yard dash in 4.7 seconds, on the low end for a halfback, but Mal Florence of the Los Angeles Times said he was "much faster in game situations".

== Professional career and later life ==
On the second day (April 29) of the 1981 NFL draft, the New Orleans Saints selected Tyler with the first pick of the ninth round, 222nd overall. The Saints also possessed the draft's first-overall pick, which they used on Heisman Trophy winner George Rogers, a halfback from the University of South Carolina. In his first training camp, Tyler wore number 42, and was signed to a contract on June 23. The 1981 New Orleans Saints finished with four wins and 12 losses, and Tyler played in all 16 games but started none. The former Washington Husky accumulated 183 yards rushing on 36 carries as well as 23 receptions. He fumbled four times overall. In the nine-game 1982 NFL season, the Saints went 4–5. Tyler played all nine games, but again did not start any. On August 29, 1983, the Saints cut Tyler, along with five other players, in order to reach the 49-man roster limit.

After a short stint with the Oakland Invaders of the United States Football League, Tyler attempted to earn a spot on the Minnesota Vikings but was waived during training camp. Tyler now lives in Covington, Washington, working as a juvenile detention officer for King County. When Marsh, Tyler's former Huskies teammate and co-CIF player of the year honoree, had his ankle amputated, Tyler spent two days at his bedside.

He retired in Pullman Washington and is raising his two young daughters at the age of 62
