= Dick Nolan (American football) =

American football player and coach (1932–2007)

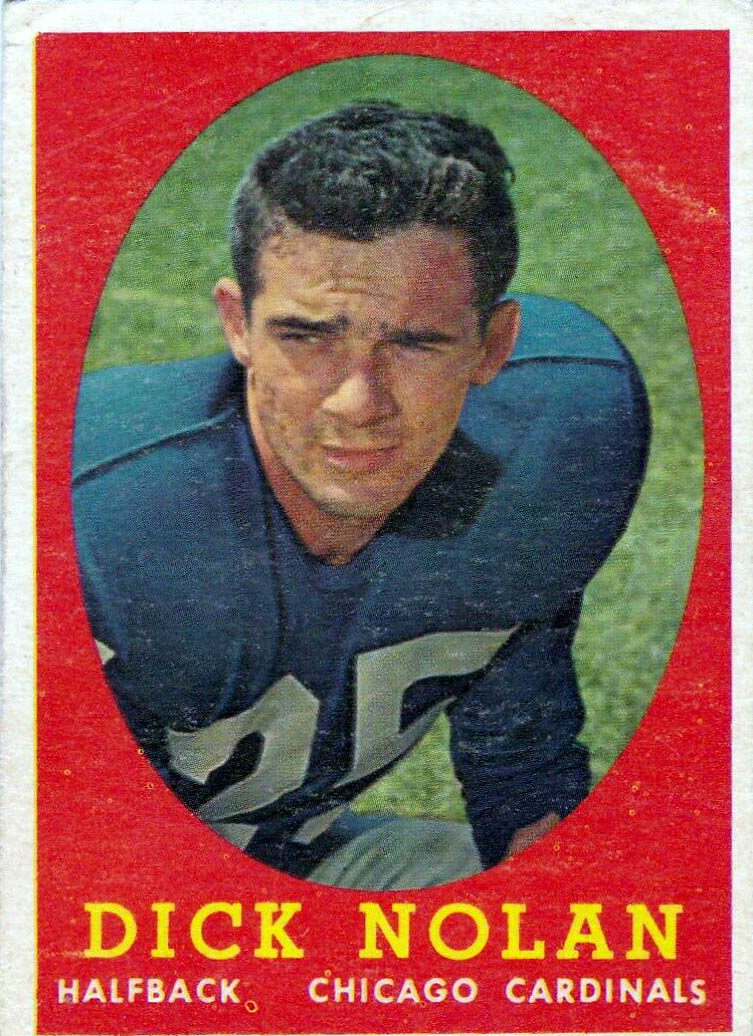
- Nolan displayed on a Topps football card of 1958

No. 25, 23
- Position: Safety

Personal information
- Born: March 26, 1932; Pittsburgh, Pennsylvania, U.S.
- Died: November 11, 2007 (aged 75); Grapevine, Texas, U.S.
- Listed height: 6 ft 1 in (1.85 m)
- Listed weight: 185 lb (84 kg)

Career information
- High school: White Plains (NY)
- College: Maryland
- NFL draft: 1954: 4th round, 41st overall pick

Career history

Playing
- New York Giants (1954–1957); Chicago Cardinals (1958); New York Giants (1959–1961); Dallas Cowboys (1962)

Coaching
- Dallas Cowboys (1962–1967); Defensive backs coach (1962–1965); Defensive coordinator (1966–1967); San Francisco 49ers (1968–1975) Head coach; New Orleans Saints (1977–1980); Linebackers coach (1977); Head coach (1978–1980); Houston Oilers (1981) Defensive coordinator; Dallas Cowboys (1982–1990); Wide receivers coach (1982–1985); Defensive backs coach (1986–1990); Denver Broncos (1991) Defensive line coach; San Antonio Force (1992) Head coach

Awards and highlights
- NFL champion (1956); National champion (1953)

Career NFL statistics
- Interceptions: 23
- Fumble recoveries: 6
- Safeties: 1
- Stats at Pro Football Reference

Head coaching record
- Regular season: 69–82–5 (.458)
- Postseason: 2–3 (.400)
- Career: 71–85–5 (.457)
- Coaching profile at Pro Football Reference

Richard Charles Nolan (March 26, 1932 – November 11, 2007) was an American professional football player and coach in the National Football League (NFL). He served as the head coach of the San Francisco 49ers and New Orleans Saints.

== Early life and college ==
In his youth, Nolan was the starting quarterback at White Plains High School. He accepted a scholarship from the University of Maryland, where he was converted to running back and safety. He received honorable-mention All-American honors as a senior. He was a key contributor to the school's 1953 championship team.

== Professional career ==
In the NFL, he played for a total of nine seasons (1954–62) at halfback and safety. He was selected in the fourth round (41st overall) of the 1954 NFL draft by the New York Giants. On May 10, 1958, he was traded to the Chicago Cardinals. He returned to the Giants in 1959.

On April 27, 1962, he was traded to the Dallas Cowboys in a three-team deal, with the Green Bay Packers acquiring kicking specialist Allen Green and the Giants obtaining a draft pick from the Packers. He reunited with former teammate Tom Landry, who used Nolan as a "player-coach". When Nolan was injured halfway through his first season, he became the Cowboys' defensive coordinator.

== Coaching career ==
Nolan was on the Cowboys' staff for six years, the last year being the season in which the Cowboys played in the Ice Bowl. Landry came up with the "flex defense", a 3-4 alignment that Nolan would utilize for his head coaching career.

On January 19, 1968, he was hired as head coach of the San Francisco 49ers. With a focus on defense that featured future Hall of Famer Dave Wilcox alongside Skip Vanderbundt and defensive end Cedrick Hardman to go with a line ready to protect quarterback John Brodie, the Niners soon became a threat in the NFC. He would coach there for eight seasons from 1968 through 1975, noted for developing the defense and taking the team to three straight NFC West division titles (1970–72), twice missing the Super Bowl by only one game (1970–71). The playoff victory over Minnesota in 1970 was the first playoff win for the 49ers since 1949. Brodie was named MVP after the 1970 season, the first player to win the award in team history.

Nolan was hired to coach the linebackers for the New Orleans Saints in 1977. When Hank Stram was fired at the end of the season, Nolan was promoted to head coach on February 6, 1978, becoming the 6th head coach in the twelfth season of the franchise. He coached the Saints from 1978–80 going 15–29. He was the first Saints head coach to win more than five games in a season. They went 7–9 in 1978, with quarterback Archie Manning having his first Pro Bowl selection on the strength of his first 3,000 yard season as a pro. With three games to go in the 1979 season, the Saints were tied for first in the NFC West with Los Angeles at 7–6, having gone from 0–3 to winning seven of the next ten. They cratered from there, with a 35–14 lead versus the Oakland Raiders at home unraveling into a 42–35 loss (with 21 coming in the final quarter). They lost the following week to San Diego before a victory over the Rams had them finishing 8–8, which was their first .500 season in team history. They had five Pro Bowl selections, most notably with Manning, Chuck Muncie, and Wes Chandler. Nolan was fired by the Saints on November 26, 1980 after an 0–12 start, in a season that saw Chuck Muncie traded four weeks in. His last game was on November 24 of that season, a 27–7 loss to the Los Angeles Rams on Monday Night Football at home, where fans took to throwing paper airplanes. Upon the dismissal, GM Steve Rosenbloom stated Nolan was "a man of character, class and dignity." The Saints finished the 1980 season 1–15, as interim coach Dick Stanfel won only one of his four games, a 21–20 victory over the New York Jets in week 15.

His alma mater, the University of Maryland, College Park, interviewed Nolan for the head coach vacancy created when Jerry Claiborne left for Kentucky, but ultimately, chose Bobby Ross, instead.

Nolan holds the dubious distinction of being the head coach of the Arena Football League's San Antonio Force in 1992, the only team in Arena history to be shut out, 50–0 by the Orlando Predators on June 13, 1992.

Nolan was well known for wearing business suits while coaching, as did many other coaches during his era. The NFL has since disallowed this practice in most circumstances due to the league signing exclusive apparel deals with sportswear companies (specifically Reebok and Nike). The league made an exception after Nolan's death in 2007, allowing Nolan's son Mike, coach of the 49ers and Jack Del Rio, coach of the Jacksonville Jaguars, to wear suits in the elder Nolan's honor.

== Head coaching record ==
Team	Year	Regular season					Postseason			
Team	Year	Won	Lost	Ties	Win %	Finish	Won	Lost	Win %	Result
SF	1968	7	6	1	.538	3rd in NFL Coastal	-	-	-	
SF	1969	4	8	2	.333	4th in NFL Coastal	-	-	-	
SF	1970	10	3	1	.769	1st in NFC West	1	1	.500	Lost to Dallas Cowboys in NFC Championship Game
SF	1971	9	5	0	.643	1st in NFC West	1	1	.500	Lost to Dallas Cowboys in NFC Championship Game
SF	1972	8	5	1	.607	1st in NFC West	0	1	.000	Lost to Dallas Cowboys in NFC Divisional Game
SF	1973	5	9	0	.357	3rd in NFC West	-	-	-	
SF	1974	6	8	0	.429	2nd in NFC West	-	-	-	
SF	1975	5	9	0	.357	2nd in NFC West	-	-	-	
SF Total		54	53	5	.504		2	3	.400	
NO	1978	7	9	0	.438	3rd in NFC West	-	-	-	
NO	1979	8	8	0	.500	2nd in NFC West	-	-	-	
NO	1980	0	12	0	.000	Fired mid-season	-	-	-	
NO Total		15	29	0	.341		-	-	-	
Total		69	82	5	.458		2	3	.400	
