= Tony Galbreath =

American football player (born 1954)

No. 34, 32, 30
- Position: Running back

Personal information
- Born: January 29, 1954 (age 72); Fulton, Missouri, U.S.
- Listed height: 6 ft 0 in (1.83 m)
- Listed weight: 228 lb (103 kg)

Career information
- College: Missouri
- NFL draft: 1976: 2nd round, 32nd overall pick

Career history
- New Orleans Saints (1976–1980); Minnesota Vikings (1981–1983); New York Giants (1984–1987)

Awards and highlights
- Super Bowl champion (XXI); New Orleans Saints Hall of Fame (1991); First-team All-Big Eight (1974); Second-team All-Big Eight (1975)

Career NFL statistics
- Rushing attempts: 1,031
- Rushing yards: 4,072
- Rushing touchdowns: 34
- Stats at Pro Football Reference

Tony Dale Galbreath (born January 29, 1954) is an American former professional football player who was a running back in the National Football League (NFL) for the New Orleans Saints, Minnesota Vikings, and New York Giants. He played college football for the Missouri Tigers and was selected in the second round of the 1976 NFL draft.

Galbreath was an All-Big Eight running back for the Missouri Tigers in 1974. He was elected team captain for the 1975 season and still ranks among the Tigers' all-time leading rushers, despite the fact that he played just two years of football after transferring from Indian Hill (Iowa) Junior College.

Galbreath was a rookie in 1976 with the New Orleans Saints and was part of the "Thunder and Lightning" backfield, along with Saints' first round pick Chuck Muncie. Galbreath quickly became one of the top pass-catching running backs in the NFL. As a rookie, he was the NFL's sixth leading receiver. In 1978, his third season with the Saints, he finished second in the NFL in receiving. He played with the Saints for five seasons, and when he left the Saints, he ranked second in all-time rushing yards for the team.

Galbreath was traded to the Minnesota Vikings in 1981. He played three years for the Vikings, primarily as a pass-catching back and blocker. Galbreath went to the New York Giants in 1984, essentially fulfilling the same role. He played four seasons with the Giants, including the 1986 season in which the Giants won the Super Bowl (Super Bowl XXI), as Galbreath was the team's second leading receiver. He retired after the 1987 season as the most prolific pass-catching running back in NFL history.

Galbreath was enshrined in the University of Missouri Athletics Hall of Fame in 1995. Galbreath was enshrined in the New Orleans Saints Hall of Fame in 1991. In 2013, he was enshrined in the Missouri Sports Hall of Fame. Galbreath's family resides in Fulton.

== NFL career statistics ==
Legend
	Won the Super Bowl
**Bold**	Career high

=== Regular season ===
Year	Team	Games		Rushing					Receiving				
Year	Team	GP	GS	Att	Yds	Avg	Lng	TD	Rec	Yds	Avg	Lng	TD
1976	NOR	14	13	136	570	4.2	**74**	7	54	420	7.8	35	1
1977	NOR	14	14	168	644	3.8	26	3	41	265	6.5	30	0
1978	NOR	**16**	**16**	186	635	3.4	20	5	**74**	**582**	7.9	35	**2**
1979	NOR	15	15	**189**	**708**	3.7	27	**9**	58	484	8.3	38	1
1980	NOR	**16**	4	81	308	3.8	26	3	57	470	8.2	21	**2**
1981	MIN	14	1	42	198	4.7	21	2	18	144	8.0	23	0
1982	MIN	8	3	39	116	3.0	12	1	17	153	9.0	32	0
1983	MIN	13	7	113	474	4.2	52	4	45	348	7.7	23	**2**
1984	NYG	**16**	0	22	97	4.4	11	0	37	357	9.6	37	0
1985	NYG	**16**	0	29	187	6.4	18	0	30	327	**10.9**	**49**	1
1986	NYG	**16**	0	16	61	3.8	10	0	33	268	8.1	19	0
1987	NYG	12	0	10	74	**7.4**	17	0	26	248	9.5	21	0
		170	73	1,031	4,072	3.9	74	34	490	4,066	8.3	49	9

=== Playoffs ===
Year	Team	Games		Rushing					Receiving				
Year	Team	GP	GS	Att	Yds	Avg	Lng	TD	Rec	Yds	Avg	Lng	TD
1982	MIN	2	**2**	**7**	14	2.0	4	0	3	14	4.7	7	0
1984	NYG	2	0	4	**34**	8.5	**13**	0	**5**	**28**	5.6	**11**	0
1985	NYG	2	0	1	9	**9.0**	9	0	2	20	**10.0**	**11**	0
1986	NYG	**3**	0	5	16	3.2	7	0	1	9	9.0	9	0
		9	2	17	73	4.3	13	0	11	71	6.5	11	0
