= Chuck Muncie =

American football player (1953–2013)

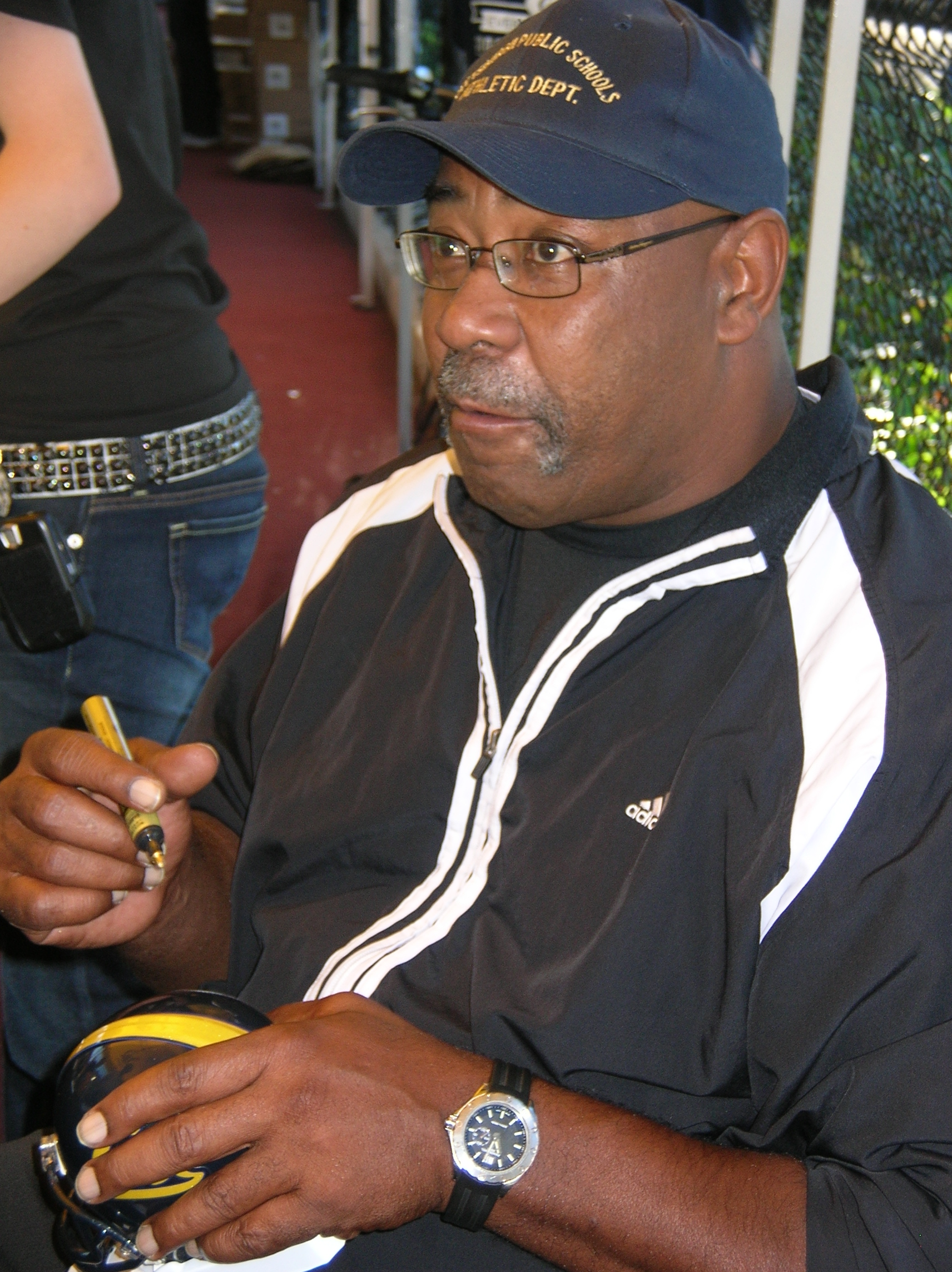
- Muncie in 2008

No. 42, 46
- Position: Running back

Personal information
- Born: March 17, 1953; Uniontown, Pennsylvania, U.S.
- Died: May 13, 2013 (aged 60); Perris, California, U.S.
- Listed height: 6 ft 3 in (1.91 m)
- Listed weight: 227 lb (103 kg)

Career information
- High school: Uniontown
- College: Arizona Western (1972); California (1973–1975)
- NFL draft: 1976: 1st round, 3rd overall pick

Career history
- New Orleans Saints (1976–1980); San Diego Chargers (1980–1984)

Awards and highlights
- 3× Pro Bowl (1979, 1981, 1982); NFL rushing touchdowns leader (1981); PFWA All-Rookie Team (1976); San Diego Chargers 50th Anniversary Team; San Diego Chargers 40th Anniversary Team; Consensus All-American (1975); Pac-8 Player of the Year (1975); Pop Warner Trophy (1975); 2× First-team All-Pac-8 (1974, 1975); Second-team All-Pac-8 (1973)

Career NFL statistics
- Rushing yards: 6,702
- Rushing average: 4.3
- Rushing touchdowns: 71
- Receptions: 263
- Receiving yards: 2,323
- Receiving touchdowns: 3
- Stats at Pro Football Reference

Harry Vance "Chuck" Muncie (March 17, 1953 − May 13, 2013) was an American professional football player who was a running back for the New Orleans Saints and San Diego Chargers in the National Football League (NFL) from 1976 to 1984. He was selected to the Pro Bowl three times, and tied the then-NFL season record for rushing touchdowns in 1981.

Muncie played college football for the California Golden Bears, setting numerous school records. In his senior year, he was the runner-up for the Heisman Trophy, given annually to the most outstanding college football player. Muncie was selected by the Saints in the first round of the 1976 NFL draft with the third overall pick. He became the first member of the Saints to be named to a Pro Bowl, and he was their first player to rush for 1,000 yards. He was traded to San Diego in 1980, starring in their high-scoring offense known as Air Coryell while being named to two additional Pro Bowls.

Muncie was considered one of the best running backs of his era until cocaine problems forced him into retirement. His drug problems eventually landed him in prison. Afterwards, he turned his life around by helping others through mentoring programs. He founded the Chuck Muncie Youth Foundation.

== Early life ==
Muncie was born and raised in the Pittsburgh area town of Uniontown, Pennsylvania, as one of six children in a football-playing family. His three brothers called him "Chuck" because they did not like "Harry". When he was six, Muncie was hit by a truck, breaking his thigh, leg, hip, and arm. He was in a cast from his neck to his toes for six months, and doctors warned that he might never be able to walk properly again. Muncie recovered to become a multi-sport athlete, but the accident left his left leg shorter than his right. He compensated by playing with a shoe with an extra-thick sole.

With Muncie's father disabled, Muncie's mother led the household and ensured that her children were educated. After seeing many of his relatives suffer from black lung disease and severe burns, Muncie had no desire to work in coal mines or the steel mills. He viewed athletics as his way out of Uniontown. In his sophomore year at Uniontown Area High School, Muncie played football. However, he quit playing after three games during his senior year when he suffered a concussion and his mother wanted him to stop playing. He turned to basketball, averaging 18 points per game for the Uniontown Red Raiders and earning an athletic scholarship to play basketball for Arizona Western Junior College (now Arizona Western College).

== College career ==
While at Arizona Western, the football coach convinced Muncie to try out for football as well, and Muncie made the team. He never played basketball for the school, and he received a scholarship from the University of California, Berkeley after one year.

At Berkeley, Muncie was a star running back for the California Golden Bears during the 1970s. He was big, fast and elusive, and was a good receiver. He was instrumental in Cal's NCAA-leading offense which propelled the team to the co-championship of the Pac-8 in 1975, and he became the first Golden Bear to appear on the cover of Sports Illustrated. Muncie set then-school single-season records for rushing yards (1,460), all-purpose yards (1,871), and rushing touchdowns (13). (Note: The rushing and all-purpose records stood for 29 years, while the touchdown mark lasted 16.) He was a runner-up for the Heisman Trophy behind two-time winner Archie Griffin of Ohio State. Muncie outrushed and outscored Griffin (1,357 yards and four touchdowns), but Ohio State was 11–0 and ranked No. 1 at the time. Muncie was awarded the 1975 W.J. Voit Memorial Trophy as the outstanding football player on the Pacific Coast. He finished his college career with then-school career records for rushing yards (3,052), rushing touchdowns (32), 100-yard rushing games (15) and all-purpose yards (4,194). (Note: At the time of his death (through the 2012 season), Muncie still ranked among leaders in rushing yards (fifth), rushing touchdowns (second), 100-yard rushing games (tied for second), and all-purpose yards (fourth).)

In his senior year in 1976, Muncie began using cocaine. He graduated from Berkeley with a Bachelor of Arts degree in social studies with a minor in business. Muncie was inducted into the Cal Athletic Hall of Fame in 1995.

== Professional career ==
=== New Orleans Saints ===
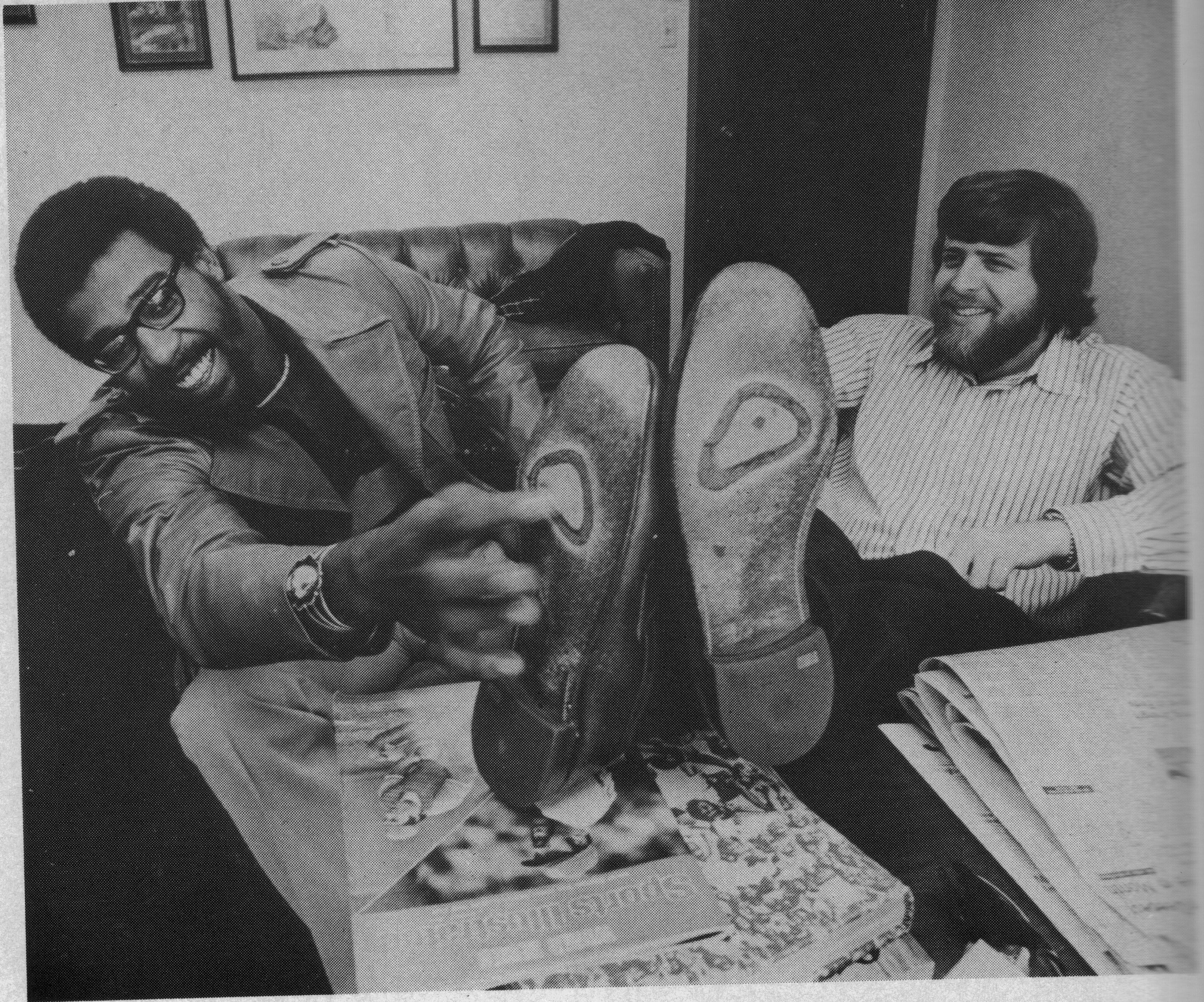
Muncie with his agent Michael Trope in 1976

Muncie was selected by the New Orleans Saints in the first round of the 1976 NFL draft with the third overall pick. He teamed with Saints' second round pick Tony Galbreath to form a backfield dubbed by then-coach Hank Stram as "Thunder and Lightning".

Muncie played in the Pro Bowl after the 1979 season with the Saints and was selected as the Most Valuable Player of the game. He was the first Saints player named to the Pro Bowl and also was the first Saints player ever to reach the 1,000-yard rushing plateau when he ran for a then-team record of 1,198 yards in 1979. Coming from the tolerant environment in Berkeley, it was a culture shock for Muncie in New Orleans, where his house and car were regularly vandalized by racists despite his living in a nice neighborhood. He frequently expressed his unhappiness in New Orleans. Saints coach Dick Nolan grew tired of Muncie being late for meetings and practices. After the Saints began the 1980 season with an 0–4 record, they traded Muncie to the 4–0 San Diego Chargers.

=== San Diego Chargers ===
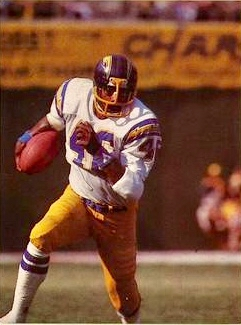
Muncie with the San Diego Chargers c. 1981

With the Chargers, Muncie was selected for the Pro Bowl twice as a member of their high-scoring Air Coryell offense. He also appeared on the cover of Sports Illustrated two additional times during the NFL Playoffs. He enjoyed his best season in 1981, when he ran for 1,144 yards and 19 touchdowns, tying the then-NFL season record for rushing touchdowns. (Note: He tied the record held by Jim Taylor and Earl Campbell. John Riggins broke the record with 24 in 1983.) He went on to rush for 120 yards and a touchdown in San Diego's 41–38 win over the Miami Dolphins in a famous playoff game known as The Epic in Miami, and 94 yards in the AFC title game, known as the Freezer Bowl. Muncie also helped lead the team to two AFC West division championships.

After the 1982 season, former New Orleans teammate Don Reese said he used cocaine with Muncie during their time with the Saints. Muncie said that he had cut down on his cocaine since his trade to San Diego. He admitted he still had a problem with alcohol and marijuana, and he underwent an initial round of rehabilitation. However, after missing a bed check and a practice during training camp, he underwent three weeks of additional rehabilitation, and returned for the start of the 1983 season. Before the second game of 1984 against the Seattle Seahawks, Muncie missed the team's charter flight from San Diego. When he arrived in Seattle, he told coach Don Coryell that vandals slashed the tires on his car. Coryell didn't believe him, and sent him back to San Diego.

Two days later, Muncie was traded to the Miami Dolphins for a second-round draft pick. At the time, he was the NFL's 13th leading rusher of all-time with 6,702 yards; however, the trade was voided after a urinalysis conducted by the Dolphins showed cocaine in his system. Afterwards, Muncie entered an Arizona drug rehabilitation center for a month. On November 15, he was suspended indefinitely by the NFL; he never played another NFL game. In March 1985, Chargers owner Alex Spanos said Muncie would never play for San Diego again, even if his suspension was lifted.

=== Retirement ===
After being reinstated later in 1985, Muncie was traded to the Minnesota Vikings. He started and performed well in the final exhibition game, but he served a one-game suspension in the season opener after failing to attend two aftercare therapy sessions that were one of the conditions of his reinstatement. Muncie retired three days later, citing his need to make his life his first priority and the difficulty with balancing drug rehabilitation with playing football.

=== Legacy ===
Muncie finished his nine-season career with 6,702 rushing yards, 263 receptions for 2,323 yards, 20 kickoff returns for 432 yards, and 74 touchdowns. He completed four passes in his career, all for touchdowns, with three of them to Wes Chandler, and he had a 141.4 passer rating. Muncie's rushing yards were the seventh-most in the NFL from 1976 though 1984, while his touchdowns ranked fourth. His 71 rushing touchdowns ranked ninth in NFL history at his retirement. At his death in 2013, he ranked fifth in Saints history in career rushing yards, and his 19 touchdowns in a season and 43 in his career with the Chargers had been surpassed only by LaDainian Tomlinson. He was named to the Saints Hall of Honor, and he was a member of the Chargers' 40th and 50th anniversary teams.

The Los Angeles Times wrote that Muncie "was gifted with size, speed and power", while The Miami News said he possessed the strength of a fullback and the elegance of a halfback. U-T San Diego added that he was "widely considered the most talented running back of his era", and the San Francisco Chronicle said Muncie "could have been the greatest running back in NFL history, a 2.0 version of Jim Brown" if he had the discipline of running backs like Walter Payton or Roger Craig. "His head is the only thing holding him back", said Jim Brown. "If he had total dedication, he could achieve any goal." While he was in New Orleans, he frequently slept through meetings whenever he attended them at all. Whenever the Saints broke the huddle, quarterback Archie Manning had to walk by Muncie and tell him exactly what he was supposed to do in the upcoming play. Manning recalled years later that it was obvious that Muncie "wasn't thinking about football" during the week.

Muncie was frustrated that he was neither in the Pro Football Hall of Fame nor the Chargers Hall of Fame, acknowledging that "I'm not there because of the choices I made." He described himself as a "functioning addict" during his Chargers tenure. He did cocaine after games, and sometimes would be high for days leading up to game day. In 1982, Reese said Muncie had to be "superman" to perform at his high level in spite of his addiction.

Muncie was one of the first players to wear glasses or goggles while playing. He began wearing glasses at Arizona Western, when he wore them at practice one day and realized they improved his nearsightedness. Muncie wore thick black frames throughout his career, switching to sports goggles late in his career. While with the Saints, he was featured in a full-page ad by glassmaker PPG for shatter-resistant glasses. Decades later in the 2010s, National Basketball Association (NBA) players were considered hipsters for wearing thick black glasses.

== NFL career statistics ==
Legend
	Led the league
**Bold**	Career high

=== Regular season ===
Year	Team	Games		Rushing						Receiving					Fumbles	
Year	Team	GP	GS	Att	Yds	Avg	Y/G	Lng	TD	Rec	Yds	Avg	Lng	TD	Fum	FR
1976	NO	12	11	149	659	4.4	54.9	51	2	31	272	8.8	33	0	6	1
1977	NO	14	11	201	811	4.0	57.9	36	6	21	248	**11.8**	35	**1**	3	0
1978	NO	13	11	160	557	3.5	42.8	28	7	26	233	9.0	34	0	7	1
1979	NO	**16**	**15**	238	**1,198**	**5.0**	74.9	69	11	40	308	7.7	28	0	8	2
1980	NO	4	3	40	168	4.2	42.0	24	2	7	25	3.6	8	0	1	0
1980	SD	11	5	135	659	4.9	59.9	53	4	24	234	9.8	19	0	**10**	0
1981	SD	15	14	**251**	1,144	4.6	**76.3**	**73**	**19**	**43**	362	8.4	32	0	9	**4**
1982	SD	9	9	138	569	4.1	63.2	27	8	25	207	8.3	**39**	**1**	4	1
1983	SD	15	12	235	886	3.8	59.1	34	12	42	**396**	9.4	27	**1**	8	1
1984	SD	1	1	14	51	3.6	51.0	11	0	4	38	9.5	20	0	1	0
Career		110	92	1,561	6,702	4.3	60.9	73	71	263	2,323	8.8	39	3	57	10

== Later life ==
In the late 1980s, Muncie was found unwashed and homeless by a police officer outside of Memorial Stadium in Berkeley. In 1989, Muncie was sentenced to 18 months in a federal prison in California after he pleaded guilty to intending to sell 2 ounces (57 g) of cocaine to a friend. He turned his life around after prison, pursuing business interests and sharing stories of his drug problems with at-risk youths. Muncie said his time in prison likely saved his life.

Muncie worked with the Boys & Girls Clubs of America. In 1997, he established the Chuck Muncie Youth Foundation in Antioch, California. The nonprofit organization mentored at-risk youth and provided free medical services, childhood immunizations, tattoo removal for gang members, and camps for chronically ill children. Muncie also led a program that mentored athletes at his alma mater in Berkeley. In his later years, he also ran a recruiting service evaluating high school football players. "Everything I did and everything I went through in my life has allowed me to do the things I'm doing now," Muncie said.

He died of a heart attack on May 13, 2013, in Perris, California, near Los Angeles.

== Personal life ==
Muncie was married to Robyn Hood. He had one daughter, Danielle Ward.

Muncie's other siblings spell their surname as "Munsey". According to George Von Benko, the executive co-chairman and co-founder of Fayette County Sports Hall of Fame, Muncie's father used various names to avoid paying bills, and used "Muncie" on hospital forms when Muncie was born. Muncie's three brothers also played professional football. George Munsey was on the taxi squad for the Minnesota Vikings, Bill Munsey played running back for the British Columbia Lions in the Canadian Football League, and Nelson Munsey was a cornerback for the Baltimore Colts.
