= Don Schwartz =

American football player (born 1956)

No. 48
- Position: Defensive back

Personal information
- Born: February 24, 1956 (age 70); Billings, Montana, U.S.
- Listed height: 6 ft 1 in (1.85 m)
- Listed weight: 191 lb (87 kg)

Career information
- High school: Archbishop Mitty
- College: Washington State
- NFL draft: 1978: 4th round, 87th overall pick

Career history
- New Orleans Saints (1978–1980); St. Louis Cardinals (1981)
- Stats at Pro Football Reference

Donald Jeffret Schwartz (born February 24, 1956) is an American former professional football player who was a defensive back in the National Football League (NFL) for the New Orleans Saints and St. Louis Cardinals. He played college football for the Washington State Cougars.
