= Brooks Williams (American football) =

American football player (1954–2008)

No. 88, 83, 80
- Position: Tight end

Personal information
- Born: December 7, 1954; Baltimore, Maryland, U.S.
- Died: January 25, 2008 (aged 53); Florida, U.S.
- Listed height: 6 ft 4 in (1.93 m)
- Listed weight: 226 lb (103 kg)

Career information
- High school: Frank W. Cox (VA)
- College: North Carolina
- NFL draft: 1978: 8th round, 199th overall pick

Career history
- New Orleans Saints (1978–1981); Chicago Bears (1981-1982); New England Patriots (1983)

Career NFL statistics
- Receptions: 37
- Receiving yards: 455
- Receiving touchdowns: 2
- Stats at Pro Football Reference

Kim Brooks Williams (December 7, 1954 – January 25, 2008) was an American professional football player who played tight end in the National Football League (NFL) for seven seasons for the New Orleans Saints, Chicago Bears, and New England Patriots.
