= George Rogers (American football) =

American football player (born 1958)

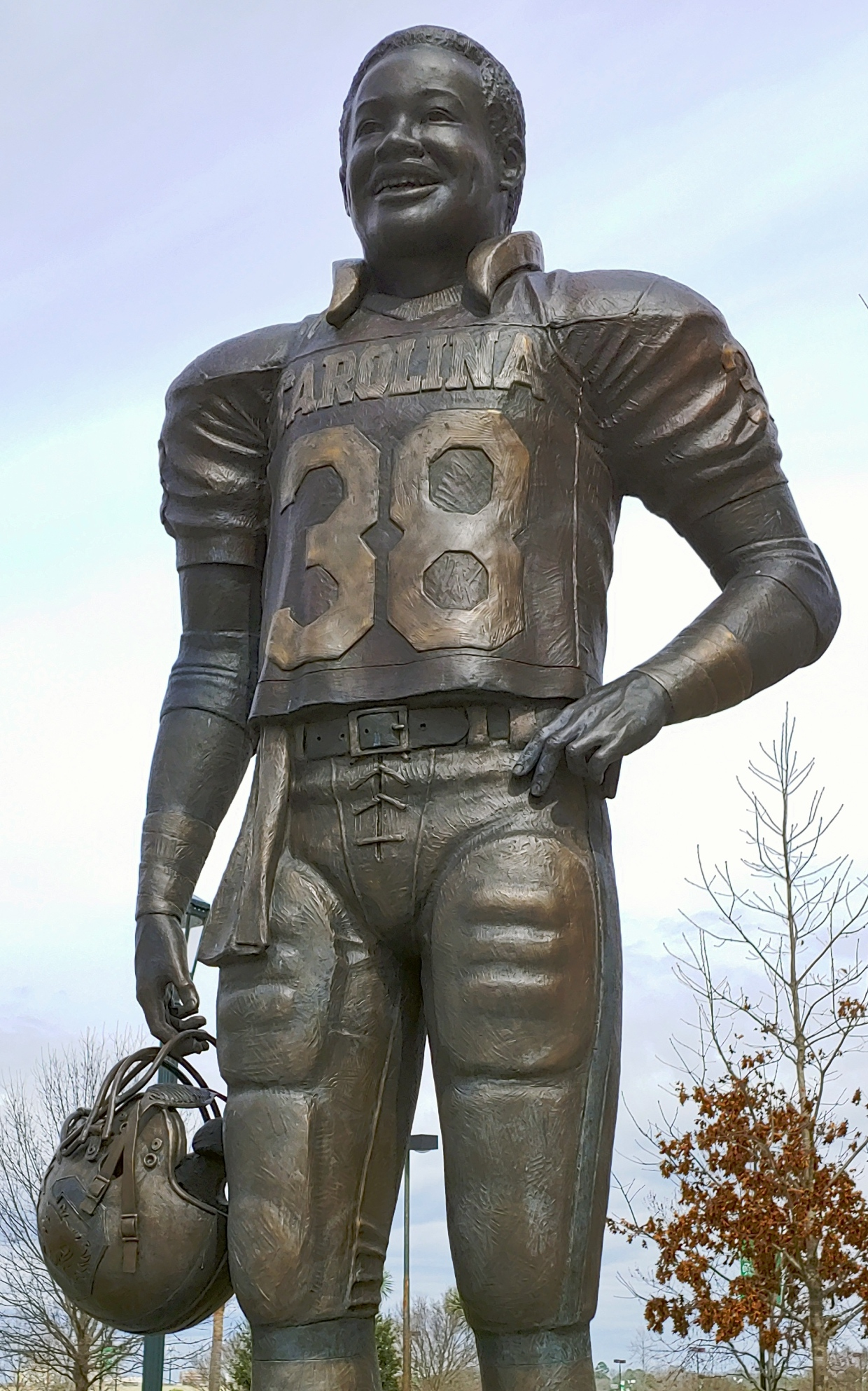
- Statue of Rogers outside Williams–Brice Stadium

No. 38
- Position: Running back

Personal information
- Born: December 8, 1958 (age 67); Duluth, Georgia, U.S.
- Listed height: 6 ft 2 in (1.88 m)
- Listed weight: 228 lb (103 kg)

Career information
- High school: Duluth
- College: South Carolina (1977–1980)
- NFL draft: 1981: 1st round, 1st overall pick

Career history
- New Orleans Saints (1981–1984); Washington Redskins (1985–1987)

Awards and highlights
- Super Bowl champion (XXII); NFL Offensive Rookie of the Year (1981); First-team All-Pro (1981); 2× Pro Bowl (1981, 1982); NFL rushing yards leader (1981); NFL rushing touchdowns leader (1986); New Orleans Saints Hall of Fame; Heisman Trophy (1980); Unanimous All-American (1980); First-team All-American (1979); South Carolina Gamecocks No. 38 retired

Career NFL statistics
- Rushing yards: 7,176
- Rushing average: 4.2
- Rushing touchdowns: 54
- Receptions: 55
- Receiving yards: 368
- Stats at Pro Football Reference
- College Football Hall of Fame

George Washington Rogers Jr. (born December 8, 1958) is an American former professional football running back who played in the National Football League (NFL) for seven seasons. He played college football for the South Carolina Gamecocks, winning the Heisman Trophy in 1980 and setting the school records for rushing yards and rushing touchdowns. Rogers was selected first overall in the 1981 NFL draft by the New Orleans Saints, where he spent his first four seasons. During his last three years, he was a member of the Washington Redskins.

In his first season, Rogers won NFL Offensive Rookie of the Year after leading the league in rushing yards, also earning Pro Bowl and first-team All-Pro honors. He received a second consecutive Pro Bowl selection the following season. With the Redskins, he led the league in rushing touchdowns in 1986. Rogers was also a member of the team that won Super Bowl XXII, his final NFL game. He was inducted to the College Football Hall of Fame in 1997.

== College career ==
Rogers was highly recruited out of Duluth High School where he played for legendary coach Cecil Morris and decided to attend the University of South Carolina when coach Jim Carlen told him that he could play in his freshman year. Due to his large size, he seemed destined to play fullback rather than tailback. However, the Gamecocks had two running backs who graduated at the same time, so he began his college career as the starting tailback midway through his freshman season.

Rogers rushed for 1,006 yards (playing in only eight games) during his sophomore year, despite splitting time with fellow sophomore Johnnie Wright. In Rogers's junior campaign, he had 1,681 rushing yards. After that season, he was given first-team All-American honors by the Associated Press and Newspaper Enterprise Association, and second-team honors from United Press International. He finished seventh in voting for the Heisman Trophy.

In 1980, the stage was set when the Gamecocks returned plenty of talent, which was headlined by senior and Heisman candidate Rogers. South Carolina finished the season with an 8–3 record. Rogers's 1,781 rushing yards was the best in the nation and earned him a spot as a finalist for the Heisman Trophy.

The Downtown Athletic Club in New York City named Rogers as the winner of the 1980 Heisman Trophy. Rogers beat out an impressive group of players, including Pittsburgh defensive lineman Hugh Green and Georgia running back Herschel Walker. Rogers also earned spots on eight All-America teams, all first-team honors.

Rogers had his number 38 retired during halftime ceremonies at South Carolina's final 1980 home game. He was the first University of South Carolina player to have his jersey retired while still active at the school.

Rogers left the Gamecocks football program as its most successful running back, and many of his records are still intact. His 5,204 yards is the highest career total by any Gamecock running back, and his 31 rushing touchdowns is tied with Harold Green for second. He is second on the all-time points scored list, with 202. Rogers rushed for over 100 yards in 27 games, including his final 22 college games.

== Professional career ==
In the 1981 NFL draft the New Orleans Saints selected Rogers with the first pick overall (one pick before the New York Giants selected Lawrence Taylor). He was the first of five Heisman Trophy winners selected by the Saints (Danny Wuerffel in 1997, Ricky Williams in 1999, Reggie Bush in 2006 and Mark Ingram II in 2011 were the other four).

In his first season, Rogers led the league in rushing with 1,674 yards, which set a record for rookies and is still the single season record for the Saints. He earned a trip to the Pro Bowl and was selected as the NFL Rookie of the Year.

Rogers spent his first four seasons in New Orleans. He played alongside quarterback Archie Manning in 1981 and eventually running back Earl Campbell, who was brought in during the 1984 season.

On April 26, 1985, Rogers was traded to the Washington Redskins together with the Saints' fifth-, tenth- and 11th-round selections in the 1985 NFL draft in return for the Redskins first-round pick.

Rogers played three more seasons, all for the Washington Redskins. When he arrived in Washington, Pro Football Hall of Fame running back John Riggins was ending his professional career, while coach Joe Gibbs was trying to rebuild the team after the retirement of Riggins and quarterback Joe Theismann. Rogers had some of his biggest professional success in Washington, including a Super Bowl title in 1987, defeating the Denver Broncos, 42–10, in Super Bowl XXII. Rogers retired due to nagging injuries after the 1987 season, ending his professional career with the Super Bowl victory. When he left the NFL, Rogers had rushed for 7,176 yards with 54 touchdowns in seven seasons. Rogers ranks second all-time to Eric Dickerson on the single season rookie rushing yards record with 1,674 yards.

Rogers has cited injuries in his playing career as key to why he feels pain on a daily basis, which involves pain to his shoulder, shins, toes, and thumb; Rogers stated in 2009 that he played through concussions.

== Career statistics ==
=== NFL ===
Legend
	Won the Super Bowl
	Led the league
**Bold**	Career high

Year	Team	Games		Rushing					Receiving				
Year	Team	GP	GS	Att	Yds	Avg	Lng	TD	Rec	Yds	Avg	Lng	TD
1981	NO	**16**	**16**	**378**	**1,674**	4.4	**79**	13	**16**	**126**	7.9	**25**	0
1982	NO	6	5	122	535	4.4	38	3	4	21	5.2	10	0
1983	NO	13	12	256	1,144	4.5	76	5	12	69	5.8	22	0
1984	NO	**16**	**16**	239	914	3.8	28	2	12	76	6.3	15	0
1985	WAS	15	5	231	1,093	**4.7**	35	7	4	29	7.3	23	0
1986	WAS	15	15	303	1,203	4.0	42	**18**	3	24	**8.0**	18	0
1987	WAS	11	9	163	613	3.8	29	6	4	23	5.8	8	0
Career		92	78	1,692	7,176	4.2	79	54	55	368	6.7	25	0

=== College ===
Legend
	Led Independents
	Led the NCAA
**Bold**	Career high

Season	Team	GP	Rushing				Receiving			
Season	Team	GP	Att	Yds	Avg	TD	Rec	Yds	Avg	TD
1977	South Carolina	12	143	623	4.4	3	**14**	**185**	**13.2**	**1**
1978	South Carolina	11	176	1,006	5.7	6	8	41	5.1	0
1979	South Carolina	12	**311**	1,681	5.4	8	**14**	140	10.0	**1**
1980	South Carolina	11	297	**1,781**	**6.0**	**14**	7	23	3.3	0
Career		46	927	5,091	5.5	31	43	389	9.0	2

* Includes bowl games.

== Awards and honors ==
NFL

- Super Bowl champion (XXII)
- NFL Offensive Rookie of the Year (1981)
- First-team All-Pro (1981)
- 2× Pro Bowl (1981, 1982)
- NFL rushing yards leader (1981)
- NFL rushing touchdowns leader (1986)
- PFWA All-Rookie Team (1981)
- New Orleans Saints Hall of Fame

College

- Heisman Trophy (1980)
- Chic Harley Award (1980)
- Unanimous All-American (1980)
- First-team All-American (1979)
- South Carolina Gamecocks No. 38 retired

== Drug arrests ==
Following his rookie season with the Saints, Rogers testified to a federal grand jury during an investigation into trafficking by another Saints player, that he along with other teammates had purchased and used cocaine during his rookie season with the Saints in 1981. He claimed to have spent more than $10,000 on cocaine during the season. He checked himself into a drug treatment center for cocaine addiction in 1982. Rogers claimed after a clean urine test in July 1982 while still in rehab, that he had stopped using the drug. In April 1990, George Rogers was arrested along with two other men in Columbia, South Carolina. All three were charged with possession with intent to distribute cocaine and possession of marijuana. All were released after posting $5,000 bonds. Since then, he appears to have overcome those problems and works at his alma mater in public relations and fund-raising and speaks out against the drug culture.

== Other honors ==
In 1992, Rogers was named to the All-Century Team at University of South Carolina. He is a member of the University of South Carolina Athletic Hall of Fame, the South Carolina Athletic Hall of Fame, the South Carolina Football Hall of Fame, the Georgia Sports Hall of Fame, the College Football Hall of Fame, and the New Orleans Saints Hall of Fame.

The road that runs along the north end of Williams-Brice Stadium was renamed in his honor and is now known as George Rogers Boulevard. A statue of Rogers was erected on the boulevard in 2015.

On December 14, 2017, Rogers had another road named after him (George Rogers Avenue) in his hometown of Duluth, Georgia.

== See also ==
- List of college football yearly rushing leaders
- Living former players diagnosed with or reporting symptoms of chronic traumatic encephalopathy
