= Rodney Lewis (American football) =

American football player (born 1959)

No. 29
- Position: Defensive back

Personal information
- Born: April 2, 1959 (age 67); Minneapolis, Minnesota, U.S.
- Listed height: 5 ft 11 in (1.80 m)
- Listed weight: 190 lb (86 kg)

Career information
- High school: Minneapolis (MN) Central
- College: Nebraska
- NFL draft: 1982: 3rd round, 58th overall pick

Career history
- New Orleans Saints (1982–1984)

Career NFL statistics
- Interceptions: 1
- Fumble recoveries: 1
- Stats at Pro Football Reference

Rodney Earl Lewis (born April 2, 1959) is an American former professional football player who was a defensive back in the National Football League (NFL). He played for the New Orleans Saints from 1982 to 1984.
