= Benny Ricardo =

Paraguayan gridiron football player (born 1954)

No. 1
- Position: Placekicker

Personal information
- Born: January 4, 1954 (age 72); Asunción, Paraguay
- Listed height: 5 ft 10 in (1.78 m)
- Listed weight: 175 lb (79 kg)

Career information
- High school: Costa Mesa (Costa Mesa, California, U.S.)
- College: San Diego State
- NFL draft: 1975: undrafted

Career history
- Southern California Sun (1975); Buffalo Bills (1976); Detroit Lions (1976–1979); New Orleans Saints (1980–1981); Minnesota Vikings (1983); San Diego Chargers (1984)

Career NFL statistics
- Field goals: 92
- Field goal attempts: 142
- Field goal %: 64.8
- Longest field goal: 48
- Stats at Pro Football Reference

Benito Concepcion "Benny" Ricardo (born January 4, 1954) is a former American football placekicker in the National Football League (NFL) (1976-1984) for the Buffalo Bills, Detroit Lions, New Orleans Saints, Minnesota Vikings, and the San Diego Chargers. He played college football at San Diego State University. He is distinguished as being the first and still only Paraguayan to play in the NFL. As a Minnesota Viking, Ricardo led the NFC in scoring in 1983 with 108 points.

Ricardo was considered a soccer prodigy and as a teen made Paraguay's national team.

== Personal life ==
Ricardo is a sometimes-actor who also has appeared in the motion pictures North Dallas Forty and Wildcats. Ricardo is also a stand-up comedian and NFL and boxing commentator, and the only bilingual announcer to have announced network events as both the lead announcer and color commentator in both Spanish and English. As of 2014, Ricardo is a color commentator on CBS NFL broadcasts and also calls fights for CBS Sports Network and ESPN. Ricardo is married to former Playboy Playmate Monique Noel. He is known to associate with Steve Watson.
