= Chuck Evans (linebacker) =

American football player (born 1956)

No. 50
- Position: Linebacker

Personal information
- Born: December 19, 1956 (age 69); West Covina, California, U.S.
- Listed height: 6 ft 3 in (1.91 m)
- Listed weight: 235 lb (107 kg)

Career information
- High school: West Covina
- College: Stanford
- NFL draft: 1980: 8th round, 206th overall pick

Career history
- New Orleans Saints (1980–1981); San Francisco 49ers (1983)*
- * Offseason or practice squad member only
- Stats at Pro Football Reference

Charles Allen Evans III (born December 19, 1956) is an American former professional football player who was a linebacker for the New Orleans Saints of National Football League (NFL). He played college football for the Stanford University.
