= John Krimm =

American football player (born 1960)

No. 21
- Position: Defensive back

Personal information
- Born: May 30, 1960 (age 66); Philadelphia, Pennsylvania, U.S.
- Listed height: 6 ft 2 in (1.88 m)
- Listed weight: 190 lb (86 kg)

Career information
- High school: Bishop Watterson (Columbus, Ohio)
- College: Notre Dame
- NFL draft: 1982: 3rd round, 76th overall pick

Career history
- New Orleans Saints (1982–1983); Los Angeles Raiders (1985)*
- * Offseason or practice squad member only

Awards and highlights
- First-team All-American (1981)
- Stats at Pro Football Reference

John Joseph Krimm Jr. (born May 30, 1960) is an American former professional football player who was a defensive back in the National Football League (NFL).

Krimm was born in Philadelphia, Pennsylvania and lived there until age 13, getting his start in football in the local youth leagues. He played scholastically at Bishop Watterson High School in Columbus, Ohio. He played collegiately for the Notre Dame Fighting Irish, where, as a senior, he was honored as a first-team All-American by Gannett News Service, the Newspaper Enterprise Association, and The Sporting News.

Krimm graduated magna cum laude in Philosophy. He was the recipient of an NCAA post-graduate scholarship and spent a summer in Washington, D.C. as a Congressional Intern.

Selected by the New Orleans Saints in the third-round of the 1982 NFL draft, Krimm was active for all nine games during the shortened season. He hyperextended his left knee during training camp in 1983, and spent the season on the injured reserve list. He was released by the Saints during the 1984 preseason.

The Los Angeles Raiders gave Krimm a tryout in 1985, but he pulled a hamstring in training camp and was released.

Krimm had three aunts and two uncles who were members of the Roman Catholic clergy.
