= Elois Grooms =

American football player (born 1953)

No. 78, 98
- Position: Defensive end

Personal information
- Born: May 20, 1953 (age 73); Tompkinsville, Kentucky, U.S.
- Listed height: 6 ft 4 in (1.93 m)
- Listed weight: 249 lb (113 kg)

Career information
- High school: Tompkinsville
- College: Tennessee Tech
- NFL draft: 1975: 3rd round, 63rd overall pick

Career history
- New Orleans Saints (1975–1981); St. Louis Cardinals (1982–1985); Philadelphia Eagles (1987)

Career NFL statistics
- Sacks: 53
- Fumble recoveries: 9
- Interceptions: 3
- Stats at Pro Football Reference

Elois T. Grooms (born May 20, 1953) is an American former professional football player who was a defensive lineman in the National Football League (NFL). He was selected by the New Orleans Saints in the third round of the 1975 NFL draft, and he played with the Saints until 1981. In 1977, Grooms caught a touchdown pass from punter Tom Blanchard on a fake field goal, his only NFL reception. Then he played for the St. Louis Cardinals from 1982 to 1985 and the Philadelphia Eagles in 1987. He played college football for the Tennessee Tech Golden Eagles. Grooms was inducted into the Kentucky Pro Football Hall of Fame in 2020.
