= Frank Wattelet =

American football player (born 1958)

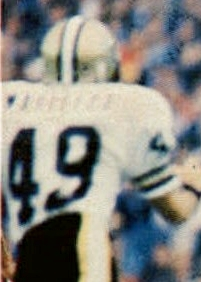
- Wattelet playing for the Saints in 1984

No. 49, 41
- Position: Safety

Personal information
- Born: October 25, 1958 (age 68). Paola, Kansas, U.S.
- Listed height: 6 ft 0 in (1.83 m)
- Listed weight: 185 lb (84 kg)

Career information
- High school: Abilene (KS)
- College: Kansas
- NFL draft: 1981: undrafted

Career history
- New Orleans Saints (1981–1987); Los Angeles Rams (1987–1988)

Career NFL statistics
- Interceptions: 12
- Fumble recoveries: 10
- Touchdowns: 2
- Stats at Pro Football Reference

Frank Wattelet (born October 25, 1958) is an American former professional football player who was a safety in the National Football League (NFL) for the New Orleans Saints and the Los Angeles Rams. He played college football for the Kansas Jayhawks and was signed by the Saints as an undrafted free agent in 1981. Wattelet played primarily on the special teams unit for his first year before becoming a starter in the backfield for the remainder of his tenure with the Black and Gold. He is tied for thirteenth on the all time Saints interception leaders list with 12 picks and scored defensive touchdowns on both an interception return and a fumble return. Wattelet was a starter for 78 of his 91 games with New Orleans Saints and played a total of 98 games before ending his NFL career with the Rams in 1988.

During his last two years at Kansas University, he became a starter and demonstrated the skills that would land him a chance to play in the NFL.
