= Russell Gary =

American football player (1959–2019)

No. 20, 24, 38
- Position: Safety

Personal information
- Born: July 31, 1959; Minneapolis, Minnesota, U.S.
- Died: March 10, 2019 (aged 59); Minneapolis, Minnesota, U.S.
- Listed height: 5 ft 11 in (1.80 m)
- Listed weight: 195 lb (88 kg)

Career information
- High school: Central (Minneapolis)
- College: Nebraska
- NFL draft: 1981: 2nd round, 29th overall pick

Career history
- New Orleans Saints (1981–1986); Philadelphia Eagles (1986-1987)

Awards and highlights
- First-team All-Big Eight (1980)

Career NFL statistics
- Interceptions: 7
- Fumble recoveries: 4
- Sacks: 4
- Stats at Pro Football Reference

Russell Craig Gary (July 31, 1959 – March 10, 2019) was an American professional football player who was a defensive back in the National Football League (NFL) for the New Orleans Saints and the Philadelphia Eagles. He played college football for the Nebraska Cornhuskers. In 1983, Gary was voted first-team All-Pro for the NFL. Russell also worked under head coacher Shannon Currier coaching the defensive backs at Concordia University, St. Paul.
