= J. T. Taylor (American football) =

American football player (born 1956)

No. 71
- Position: Offensive tackle

Personal information
- Born: August 12, 1956 (age 70); Peoria, Illinois, U.S.
- Listed height: 6 ft 4 in (1.93 m)
- Listed weight: 265 lb (120 kg)

Career information
- High school: Woodruff
- College: Missouri
- NFL draft: 1978: 2nd round, 33rd overall pick

Career history
- New Orleans Saints (1978–1981)

Awards and highlights
- Second-team All-American (1977)

Career NFL statistics
- Games played: 57
- Games started: 57
- Fumble recoveries: 4
- Stats at Pro Football Reference

James Michael "J. T." Taylor (born August 12, 1956) is an American former professional football player who was an offensive tackle for the New Orleans Saints of the National Football League (NFL). He played college football for the Missouri Tigers and was selected by the New Orleans Saints in the second round of the 1978 NFL draft.
