= Glen Redd =

American football player (1958–2007)

No. 58
- Position: Linebacker

Personal information
- Born: June 17, 1958; Ogden, Utah, U.S.
- Died: November 17, 2007 (aged 49); Plain City, Utah, U.S.
- Listed height: 6 ft 1 in (1.85 m)
- Listed weight: 229 lb (104 kg)

Career information
- High school: Ogden
- College: BYU
- NFL draft: 1981: 6th round, 166th overall pick

Career history
- New Orleans Saints (1981–1986); Indianapolis Colts (1986)

Career NFL statistics
- Sacks: 2
- Interceptions: 2
- Fumble recoveries: 2
- Stats at Pro Football Reference

Glen Herrscher Redd (June 17, 1958 – November 17, 2007) was an American professional football player who was a linebacker for five seasons for the New Orleans Saints and the Indianapolis Colts. Redd received scholarship offers Utah State University to play fullback, and from BYU as a linebacker. He opted to play at BYU, where he was an anchor of the 1980 Cougars defense. Reed played outside linebacker for BYU but was switched to inside linebacker when he was selected 166th overall by the Saints in the sixth round of the 1981 NFL draft. In September 1989, he married Cindi Crook, and they had three children: Clint, Lexi, and Kadi. Redd died of cancer in Plain City, Utah, where he had been living, on November 17, 2007.
