= Barry Bennett =

American football player (1955–2019)

No. 63, 78
- Position: Defensive tackle

Personal information
- Born: December 10, 1955; St. Paul, Minnesota, U.S.
- Died: August 19, 2019 (aged 63); Long Prairie, Minnesota, U.S.
- Listed height: 6 ft 4 in (1.93 m)
- Listed weight: 257 lb (117 kg)

Career information
- High school: North St. Paul (MN)
- College: Concordia (Moorhead)
- NFL draft: 1978: 3rd round, 60th overall pick

Career history
- New Orleans Saints (1978–1981); New York Jets (1982–1988); Minnesota Vikings (1988)

Career NFL statistics
- Sacks: 23.5
- Fumble recoveries: 4
- Stats at Pro Football Reference

Barry Martin Bennett (December 10, 1955 – August 19, 2019) was an American professional football defensive tackle who played eleven seasons in the National Football League (NFL) for the New Orleans Saints, New York Jets and Minnesota Vikings. He attended and played football at Concordia College (Moorhead, Minnesota), where he was coached by Jim Christopherson.

== Death ==
Bennett and his wife Carol were found shot to death at their Long Prairie, Minnesota, home on August 21, 2019. A friend went to check on them after phone calls and texts had gone unanswered since the day prior. Investigators determined that the couple was killed on August 19; Carol was shot multiple times in the back and torso, while Barry was shot multiple times in the head and torso.

On August 23, the couple's son, 22-year-old Dylan Bennett, was charged with two counts of second degree murder, without premeditation, in connection with the killings. He is believed to have taken his mother's car and traveled to Columbus, Ohio, from where he boarded a flight to Cancun, Mexico. Barry had told the Todd County Sheriff's Office in December 2018 that Dylan had expressed thoughts about killing his parents while being treated at a mental health facility. Dylan was arrested in Cancun on August 24. Dylan Bennett pleaded guilty on August 24, 2020, and was sentenced to two concurrent life terms without parole.
