= Wayne Wilson (American football) =

American football player (1957–2024)

No. 30, 45, 26
- Position: Running back

Personal information
- Born: September 4, 1957; Montgomery County, Maryland, U.S.
- Died: March 10, 2024 (aged 66)
- Listed height: 6 ft 3 in (1.91 m)
- Listed weight: 213 lb (97 kg)

Career information
- High school: Howard (Ellicott City, Maryland)
- College: Shepherd
- NFL draft: 1979: 12th round, 324th overall pick

Career history
- New Orleans Saints (1979–1986); Minnesota Vikings (1986); Washington Redskins (1987)

Awards and highlights
- Super Bowl champion (XXII)

Career NFL statistics
- Rushing yards: 2,531
- Rushing average: 3.7
- Rushing touchdowns: 18
- Stats at Pro Football Reference

Wayne MacArthur Wilson (September 4, 1957 – March 10, 2024) was an American professional football player who was a running back for nine seasons in the National Football League (NFL), primarily for the New Orleans Saints. He played college football for the Shepherd Rams and was selected in the 12th round of the 1979 NFL draft by the Houston Oilers.

His best season was as a starting fullback for New Orleans in 1983, when he led the team with 11 touchdowns, gaining 787 yards rushing, 178 yards receiving, and 239 yards returning kickoffs. In 2018, Wilson was awarded a Super Bowl ring for playing for the Washington Redskins in 1987, the year they won Super Bowl XXII.

Wilson died on March 10, 2024, at the age of 66.
