= Jimmy Rogers (running back) =

American gridiron football player (born 1955)

No. 11, 41
- Position: Running back

Personal information
- Born: June 29, 1955 (age 71); Forrest City, Arkansas, U.S.
- Listed height: 5 ft 10 in (1.78 m)
- Listed weight: 190 lb (86 kg)

Career information
- High school: Forrest City
- College: Oklahoma
- NFL draft: 1979: undrafted

Career history
- Edmonton Eskimos (1979)*; New Orleans Saints (1980–1984)
- * Offseason or practice squad member only

Awards and highlights
- Grey Cup champion (1979); 2× National champion (1974, 1975)
- Stats at Pro Football Reference

James Lee Rogers (born June 29, 1955) is an American former professional football running back who played five seasons with the New Orleans Saints of the National Football League (NFL). He played college football at the University of Oklahoma. He was also a member of the Edmonton Eskimos of the Canadian Football League (CFL).

== Early life ==
James Lee Rogers was born on June 29, 1955, in Forrest City, Arkansas. He attended Forrest City High School in Forrest City.

== College career ==
Rogers was a letterman for the Oklahoma Sooners in 1974, 1976, 1977, and 1978. He rushed nine times for 66 yards his true freshman year in 1974 as the Sooners were named AP national champions. He was redshirted in 1975 as Oklahoma was named consensus national champions. Rogers totaled eight carries for 24 yards in 1976. He rushed 26 times for 112 yards during the 1977 season. As a senior in 1978, he recorded 31 rushing attempts for 258 yards and five touchdowns while also returning three kicks for 42 yards.

== Professional career ==
Rogers spent the 1979 season on the Edmonton Eskimos' practice roster. The Eskimos won the 67th Grey Cup against the Montreal Alouettes on November 25, 1979.

Rogers played in 72 games, starting ten, for the New Orleans Saints from 1980 to 1984. He was the Saints' leading rusher with 366 yards in 1980 and also the team's leading kickoff returner with 930 yards.
