= Jack Holmes (American football) =

American football player (born 1953)

No. 45
- Position: Running back

Personal information
- Born: June 20, 1953 (age 73); Rolling Fork, Mississippi, U.S.
- Listed height: 5 ft 11 in (1.80 m)
- Listed weight: 210 lb (95 kg)

Career information
- High school: Rolling Fork
- College: Texas Southern
- NFL draft: 1975: 15th round, 377th overall pick

Career history
- New Orleans Saints (1978–1982)

Career NFL statistics
- Rushing attempts: 117
- Rushing yards: 393
- Receptions: 71
- Receiving yards: 453
- Total TDs: 5
- Stats at Pro Football Reference

John Holmes (born June 20, 1953) is an American former professional football player who was a running back for the New Orleans Saints of the National Football League (NFL). He played college football for the Texas Southern Tigers. He played college football for the Texas Southern Tigers. He also played professionally in the United States Football League (USFL) for the Oakland Invaders.
