= Dave LaFary =

American football player (born 1955)

Dave Lafary
No. 64
- Position: Offensive tackle

Personal information
- Born: January 13, 1955 (age 71); Cincinnati, Ohio, U.S.
- Listed height: 6 ft 7 in (2.01 m)
- Listed weight: 280 lb (127 kg)

Career information
- High school: La Salle (OH)
- College: Purdue
- NFL draft: 1977: 5th round, 118th overall pick

Career history
- New Orleans Saints (1977–1986)

Career NFL statistics
- Games played: 109
- Games started: 58
- Fumble recoveries: 3
- Stats at Pro Football Reference

David Walter LaFary (born January 13, 1955) is an American former professional football player who was a tackle for the New Orleans Saints of the National Football League (NFL). LaFary played college football for the Purdue Boilermakers, and played tackle for La Salle High School.

Lafary was up for anything — lining up at left tackle for most of his career, or switching to right guard for a season. He didn't make a fuss about not getting featured on the starting unit, with just 58 starts in 109 career games. Fifth-round draft picks had to be. His willingness to move around the line and relative success from different positions did a lot to build trust with the coaching staff, and it helped Lafary stick around for a long time.
