= Rich Mauti =

American football player (born 1954)

No. 84, 83
- Position: Wide receiver

Personal information
- Born: May 25, 1954 (age 72); East Meadow, New York, U.S.
- Listed height: 6 ft 0 in (1.83 m)
- Listed weight: 190 lb (86 kg)

Career information
- High school: East Meadow
- College: Penn State
- NFL draft: 1977: undrafted

Career history
- New Orleans Saints (1977–1983); Washington Redskins (1984)

Career NFL statistics
- Receptions: 21
- Receiving yards: 314
- Receiving touchdowns: 2
- Stats at Pro Football Reference

Richard Dominic Mauti (born May 25, 1954) is an American former professional football player who was a wide receiver and special teams player in the National Football League (NFL) for the New Orleans Saints and the Washington Redskins. He played college football for the Penn State Nittany Lions.

In six seasons with the New Orleans Saints, Mauti, a reserve wide receiver, excelled as a special teams player. In 1978, he was named the Saints' special teams MVP after setting an NFL record for special team tackles with 27 solo tackles and 4 assisted tackles for the year. In 1980, he finished second in the NFL and first in the NFC in average return yards on kickoffs and was named to the Pro Bowl as the NFC's punt returner. In 1979, the magazine Football Digest named Mauti its NFL Specialist of the Year.

Rich Mauti is also the founder of the Rich Mauti Cancer Fund, a voluntary, a 501c3 non-profit organization designed to raise money for cancer research, education and screenings, with all funds to be utilized in the State of Louisiana. While Mauti was playing for the Saints he started Mauti Challenge where businesses and individuals could pledge contributions to cancer research. Donations were $10 for every return and $1 for every yard from returns.

Two of his sons also played football for Penn State. Patrick Mauti was a wide receiver at Penn State from 2005 to 2009. Michael Mauti, who played at Penn State from 2008 to 2012, was Big Ten Linebacker of the Year as a senior. He also played five seasons in the NFL as a linebacker and special teams player for the New Orleans Saints and Minnesota Vikings.
