= List of Jackson State Tigers in the NFL draft =

== Key ==
| B | Back | K | Kicker | NT | Nose tackle |
| C | Center | LB | Linebacker | FB | Fullback |
| DB | Defensive back | P | Punter | HB | Halfback |
| DE | Defensive end | QB | Quarterback | WR | Wide receiver |
| DT | Defensive tackle | RB | Running back | G | Guard |
| E | End | T | Offensive tackle | TE | Tight end |

== Selections ==
| Year | Round | Pick | Overall | Player | Team | Position |
|---|---|---|---|---|---|---|
| 1956 | 20 | 6 | 235 | Robert Hill | Baltimore Colts | B |
| 1959 | 8 | 9 | 93 | Bill Conner | Los Angeles Rams | E |
| 1959 | 17 | 9 | 201 | Willie Neal | Chicago Bears | B |
| 1963 | 7 | 5 | 89 | Willie Richardson | Baltimore Colts | E |
| 1963 | 12 | 10 | 164 | Roy Curry | Pittsburgh Steelers | B |
| 1963 | 18 | 13 | 251 | Al Greer | Detroit Lions | E |
| 1964 | 4 | 9 | 51 | Ben McGee | Pittsburgh Steelers | T |
| 1965 | 10 | 1 | 127 | Ben Crenshaw | New York Giants | B |
| 1965 | 11 | 3 | 143 | Frank Molden | Pittsburgh Steelers | T |
| 1965 | 15 | 14 | 210 | Roy Hilton | Baltimore Colts | RB |
| 1966 | 19 | 4 | 279 | Taft Reed | Philadelphia Eagles | DB |
| 1967 | 2 | 8 | 34 | Lem Barney | Detroit Lions | DB |
| 1967 | 6 | 20 | 153 | Bob Hughes | Philadelphia Eagles | DE |
| 1967 | 9 | 24 | 235 | Ed Pope | Kansas City Chiefs | DT |
| 1967 | 11 | 5 | 268 | John Walker | Atlanta Falcons | LB |
| 1967 | 14 | 25 | 366 | Claudis James | Green Bay Packers | RB |
| 1968 | 2 | 5 | 32 | Tom Funchess | Boston Patriots | T |
| 1968 | 6 | 22 | 160 | Sidney Ellis | Cincinnati Bengals | DB |
| 1968 | 7 | 15 | 180 | Doug Chatman | New York Giants | DE |
| 1968 | 10 | 3 | 249 | John Outlaw | Boston Patriots | DB |
| 1968 | 12 | 14 | 314 | Jim Holifield | New York Giants | DB |
| 1968 | 12 | 23 | 323 | Harold Jackson | Los Angeles Rams | WR |
| 1968 | 12 | 24 | 324 | James Jackson | Baltimore Colts | T |
| 1968 | 14 | 20 | 374 | Edgar Whipps | Cleveland Browns | RB |
| 1968 | 14 | 23 | 377 | Cephus Jackson | Los Angeles Rams | DB |
| 1968 | 16 | 11 | 419 | Willie Turner | Washington Redskins | RB |
| 1968 | 17 | 27 | 462 | Jimmy Smith | Cincinnati Bengals | TE |
| 1969 | 8 | 8 | 190 | Jim Carr | Detroit Lions | T |
| 1969 | 8 | 21 | 203 | Richard Harvey | Los Angeles Rams | DB |
| 1969 | 15 | 17 | 381 | Eugene Mosley | Minnesota Vikings | TE |
| 1970 | 2 | 20 | 46 | Rich Caster | New York Jets | WR |
| 1970 | 4 | 7 | 85 | Joe Stevens | Cincinnati Bengals | G |
| 1970 | 8 | 3 | 185 | Narvel Chavers | Miami Dolphins | RB |
| 1970 | 12 | 25 | 311 | James Holland | Minnesota Vikings | DB |
| 1972 | 1 | 9 | 9 | Jerome Barkum | New York Jets | WR |
| 1972 | 7 | 12 | 168 | Rob Kelly | Pittsburgh Steelers | DB |
| 1972 | 7 | 19 | 175 | Edgar Hardy | San Francisco 49ers | G |
| 1972 | 11 | 12 | 272 | Ed Wimberly | Chicago Bears | DB |
| 1972 | 15 | 2 | 366 | Hosea Minnieweather | Cincinnati Bengals | DT |
| 1973 | 3 | 26 | 78 | Leon Gray | Miami Dolphins | G |
| 1974 | 1 | 26 | 26 | Don Reese | Miami Dolphins | DE |
| 1974 | 3 | 22 | 74 | Roscoe Word | New York Jets | DB |
| 1974 | 13 | 6 | 318 | John Tate | New York Jets | LB |
| 1975 | 1 | 4 | 4 | Walter Payton | Chicago Bears | RB |
| 1975 | 1 | 6 | 6 | Robert Brazile | Houston Oilers | LB |
| 1975 | 7 | 8 | 164 | Rickey Young | San Diego Chargers | RB |
| 1975 | 8 | 1 | 183 | John Tate | New York Giants | LB |
| 1975 | 10 | 15 | 249 | Charles James | New York Jets | DB |
| 1976 | 3 | 26 | 86 | Jackie Slater | Los Angeles Rams | T |
| 1976 | 12 | 17 | 336 | Joe Lowery | Buffalo Bills | RB |
| 1977 | 12 | 8 | 315 | Oakley Dalton | New Orleans Saints | DT |
| 1977 | 12 | 15 | 322 | Terry Irvin | Cincinnati Bengals | DB |
| 1978 | 5 | 9 | 119 | Louis Bullard | Seattle Seahawks | T |
| 1978 | 9 | 8 | 230 | Charles Williams | Philadelphia Eagles | DB |
| 1978 | 10 | 1 | 251 | Earl Bryant | Kansas City Chiefs | DE |
| 1978 | 10 | 7 | 257 | Ricky Patton | Atlanta Falcons | RB |
| 1978 | 12 | 4 | 310 | Larry Hardy | New Orleans Saints | TE |
| 1979 | 10 | 19 | 267 | Robert Hardy | Seattle Seahawks | DT |
| 1979 | 12 | 16 | 319 | Jeff Moore | Seattle Seahawks | RB |
| 1980 | 2 | 25 | 53 | Perry Harrington | Philadelphia Eagles | RB |
| 1981 | 8 | 7 | 200 | Larry Werts | Green Bay Packers | LB |
| 1981 | 11 | 23 | 299 | Buster Barnett | Buffalo Bills | TE |
| 1982 | 3 | 6 | 61 | Carl Powell | Washington Redskins | WR |
| 1982 | 7 | 25 | 192 | Larry Cowan | Miami Dolphins | RB |
| 1983 | 9 | 18 | 242 | Otis Brown | St. Louis Cardinals | RB |
| 1983 | 10 | 7 | 258 | Thomas Strauthers | Philadelphia Eagles | DT |
| 1983 | 11 | 14 | 293 | Larry White | Buffalo Bills | DE |
| 1984 | 9 | 27 | 251 | David Windham | New England Patriots | LB |
| 1984 | 11 | 7 | 287 | Tommy Norman | Atlanta Falcons | WR |
| 1985 | 2 | 14 | 42 | Chris Burkett | Buffalo Bills | WR |
| 1986 | 2 | 1 | 28 | Jackie Walker | Tampa Bay Buccaneers | LB |
| 1986 | 10 | 22 | 271 | Victor Hall | Denver Broncos | TE |
| 1987 | 4 | 25 | 109 | Leon Seals | Buffalo Bills | DE |
| 1988 | 6 | 3 | 140 | Houston Hoover | Atlanta Falcons | G |
| 1988 | 9 | 21 | 242 | Deatrich Wise | Seattle Seahawks | DT |
| 1988 | 12 | 9 | 314 | Albert Goss | New York Jets | DT |
| 1989 | 4 | 9 | 93 | Lewis Tillman | New York Giants | RB |
| 1989 | 10 | 11 | 262 | Charles Jackson | Los Angeles Raiders | DT |
| 1990 | 2 | 2 | 27 | Darion Conner | Atlanta Falcons | LB |
| 1990 | 10 | 20 | 268 | Mike Wallace | Cleveland Browns | DB |
| 1990 | 11 | 27 | 303 | Ron Lewis | Los Angeles Raiders | WR |
| 1991 | 3 | 22 | 77 | Tim Barnett | Kansas City Chiefs | WR |
| 1992 | 2 | 8 | 36 | Jimmy Smith | Dallas Cowboys | WR |
| 1992 | 8 | 12 | 208 | Dietrich Lockridge | Denver Broncos | G |
| 1993 | 1 | 19 | 19 | Lester Holmes | Philadelphia Eagles | G |
| 1993 | 7 | 14 | 182 | Antonius Kimbrough | Denver Broncos | WR |
| 1994 | 2 | 26 | 55 | Fernando Smith | Minnesota Vikings | DE |
| 1994 | 3 | 16 | 81 | Marlo Perry | Buffalo Bills | LB |
| 1996 | 4 | 9 | 104 | Eric Austin | Tampa Bay Buccaneers | DB |
| 1996 | 7 | 19 | 228 | Gregory Spann | Jacksonville Jaguars | WR |
| 1997 | 5 | 23 | 153 | Sean Woodson | Buffalo Bills | DB |
| 1998 | 5 | 24 | 147 | Toby Myles | New York Giants | T |
| 1998 | 5 | 27 | 150 | Corey Bradford | Green Bay Packers | WR |
| 2000 | 1 | 21 | 21 | Sylvester Morris | Kansas City Chiefs | WR |
| 2000 | 1 | 23 | 23 | Rashard Anderson | Carolina Panthers | DB |
| 2000 | 7 | 3 | 209 | Eric Chandler | Cleveland Browns | DE |
| 2000 | 7 | 40 | 246 | Leroy Fields | Denver Broncos | WR |
| 2008 | 6 | 27 | 193 | Jaymar Johnson | Minnesota Vikings | WR |
| 2022 | 6 | 38 | 217 | James Houston | Detroit Lions | LB |
| 2023 | 7 | 27 | 245 | Isaiah Bolden | New England Patriots | DB |

== Notable undrafted players ==
Note: No drafts held before 1920

| Year | Player | Position | Debut Team | Notes |
|---|---|---|---|---|
| 1963 | Jim Hayes | DL | Minnesota Vikings | — |
| 1964 | Speedy Duncan | DB | San Diego Chargers | — |
| 1966 | Tom Richardson | WR | Dallas Cowboys | — |
| 1971 | Lee Thomas | DE | San Diego Chargers | — |
| 1974 | Bill Houston | WR | Dallas Cowboys | — |
| 1974 | Jim Marshall | DB | Dallas Cowboys | — |
| 1974 | Emanuel Zanders | G | Miami Dolphins | — |
| 1975 | Rod Phillips | RB | Los Angeles Rams | — |
| 1976 | Vernon Perry | S | Chicago Bears | — |
| 1977 | Eddie Payton | RB | Cleveland Browns | — |
| 1983 | Cleo Simmons | TE | Dallas Cowboys | — |
| 1984 | Roy Bennett | DB | Dallas Cowboys | — |
| 1984 | Sylvester Stamps | RB | Atlanta Falcons | — |
| 1986 | Reggie Carr | DE | Cleveland Browns | — |
| 1987 | James Harvey | OL | Kansas City Chiefs | — |
| 1987 | Steve Martin | DE | Washington Redskins | — |
| 1987 | Stacey Mobley | WR | Los Angeles Rams | — |
| 1988 | Paul McJulien | P | San Diego Chargers | — |
| 1989 | Kevin Dent | DB | Phoenix Cardinals | — |
| 1993 | Robert Staten | FB | Minnesota Vikings | — |
| 1996 | Picasso Nelson | LB | Houston Oilers | — |
| 1998 | Quincy Coleman | DB | Chicago Bears | — |
| 2000 | Destry Wright | RB | Pittsburgh Steelers | — |
| 2004 | Robert Kent | QB | Tennessee Titans | — |
| 2005 | Chris Jones | WR | Minnesota Vikings | — |
| 2006 | Cletis Gordon | CB | San Diego Chargers | — |
| 2008 | Lavarus Giles | RB | Jacksonville Jaguars | — |
| 2009 | Marcus Benard | LB | Cleveland Browns | — |
| 2009 | D. J. Johnson | CB | Denver Broncos | — |
| 2010 | Marcell Young | DB | New Orleans Saints | — |
| 2013 | Rico Richardson | WR | Kansas City Chiefs | — |
| 2017 | Dan Williams III | WR | New York Jets | — |
