= Warren Central High School =

Warren Central High School may refer to:

- Warren Central High School (Indiana), in Warren Township on the east side of Indianapolis, Indiana
- Warren Central High School (Kentucky), in Bowling Green, Warren County, Kentucky
- Warren Central High School (Mississippi), in Vicksburg, Warren County, Mississippi
