= Hugh Green (American football) =

American football player (born 1959)

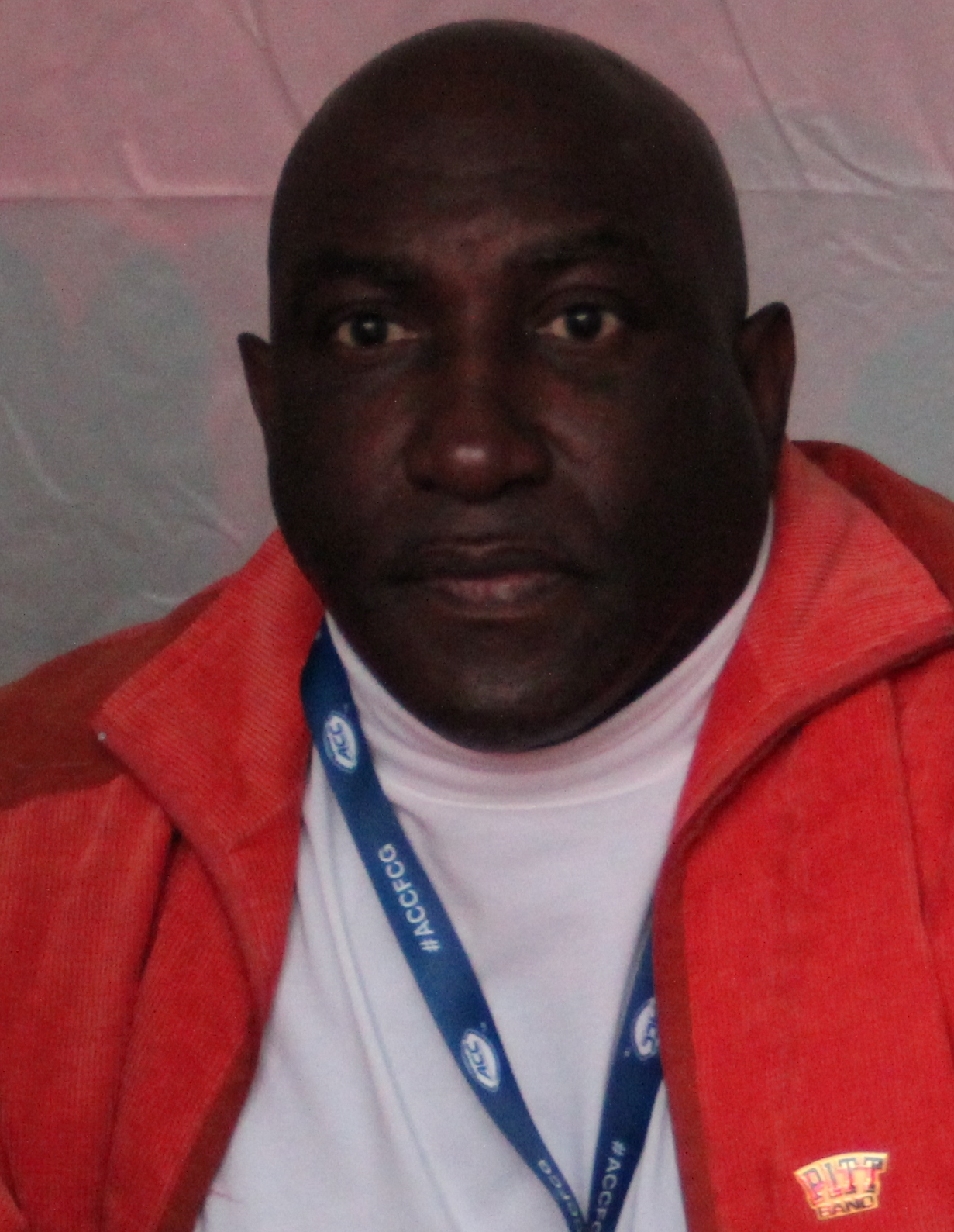
- Green c. 2014

No. 53, 55
- Position: Linebacker

Personal information
- Born: July 27, 1959 (age 67); Natchez, Mississippi, U.S.
- Listed height: 6 ft 2 in (1.88 m)
- Listed weight: 225 lb (102 kg)

Career information
- High school: North Natchez
- College: Pittsburgh (1977–1980)
- NFL draft: 1981: 1st round, 7th overall pick

Career history
- Tampa Bay Buccaneers (1981–1985); Miami Dolphins (1985–1991)

Awards and highlights
- 2× First-team All-Pro (1982, 1983); 2× Second-team All-Pro (1982, 1983); 2× Pro Bowl (1982, 1983); PFWA All-Rookie Team (1981); Maxwell Award (1980); Walter Camp Award (1980); Lombardi Award (1980); SN Player of the Year (1980); UPI Player of the Year (1980); UPI Lineman of the Year (1980); 2× Unanimous All-American (1979, 1980); Consensus All-American (1978); Second-team All-American (1977); 4× First-team All-Big East (1977–1980); First-team AP All-Time All-American (2025); Pittsburgh Panthers No. 99 retired

Career NFL statistics
- Sacks: 34.3
- Interceptions: 3
- Interception yards: 169
- Fumble recoveries: 7
- Defensive touchdowns: 2
- Stats at Pro Football Reference
- College Football Hall of Fame

Hugh Donell Green (born July 27, 1959) is an American former professional football player who was a linebacker for 11 seasons in the National Football League (NFL) from 1981 to 1991. He played college football for the Pittsburgh Panthers as a defensive end, and was recognized as a three-time consensus All-American. Green was selected in the first round of the 1981 NFL draft, and played for the Tampa Bay Buccaneers and the Miami Dolphins.

== Early life ==
Green was born in Natchez, Mississippi. He attended North Natchez High School.

== College career ==
Green attended the University of Pittsburgh, where he played defensive end for the University of Pittsburgh Panthers from 1977 to 1980. Green was part of an elite team that included four future NFL Hall of Fame players: Defensive end Rickey Jackson, Center Russ Grimm, lineman Jimbo Covert and quarterback Dan Marino. Several other future NFL stars would be his teammates, including Mark May. He was a three-time consensus first-team All-American (1978, 1979, 1980) and a second-team All-America selection as a freshman in 1977. He was a consensus four-time All-East selection as well. In the 4 years Green played, the Pittsburgh Panthers compiled a 39–8–1 record, winning three bowl games en route (two Gator Bowls and one Fiesta Bowl). His No. 99 jersey was retired at halftime of his final home game in the 1980 season. After the season, he played in both the Hula Bowl and Japan Bowl All-star games.

Green left the university with 460 tackles and 53 career sacks in his college career. According to USC and Tampa Bay Buccaneers coach John McKay, "Hugh Green is the most productive player at his position I have ever seen in college". The table is a year-by-year showing of Green's defensive statistics.

Defensive Statistics
Season	Games	Tackles	Assists	Total	For Loss	Sacks	Yds Lost	Int	FF	FR	PD	Hur	BK
1977	12	58	34	92	15	12	-76	1	5	3	4	21	2
1978	12	66	43	109	12	13	-82	2	6	3	6	21	0
1979	12	76	59	135	14	11	-104	1	6	3	5	17	0
1980	12	77	46	123	11	17	-112	0	7	4	6	17	0
Total	48	277	183	460	52	53	-374	4	24	13	22	76	2

In 1980, Green won the Walter Camp Award, the Maxwell Award, the Lombardi Award and was the Sporting News Player of the Year, the UPI Player of the Year and finished second in the Heisman Trophy balloting, losing to running back George Rogers of the University of South Carolina. Green's second-place finish in the voting was the best a defensive specialist had ever attained until 1997, when Charles Woodson won the award.

Green was selected to the College Football Hall of Fame in 1996 and was named the fifth greatest college football player of All-Time by collegefootballnews.com. He was named to the all-time All-American team compiled by The Sporting News in 1983. In 2007, Green was ranked No. 14 on ESPN's Top 25 Players In College Football History list. He was also named to Sports Illustrated's College Football All-Century team in 1999.

== Professional career ==
Green was selected as the seventh overall pick of the first round by the Buccaneers in the 1981 NFL draft. He was a 1982 All-Pro and 1983 All-Pro and was elected to the Pro Bowl twice in his career, in 1982 and 1983. Later in his career he suffered several injuries, including a car accident in the middle of the 1984 season for a fracture near the eye. He was traded to the Miami Dolphins in the middle of the 1985 season in exchange for their first- and second-round draft choices in the 1986 draft. In the 1985 season he was on to a career-high in sacks and ended the season getting 7.5 while playing all 16 games despite the mid-season trade.

His 1986 season ended in the Week 3 classic 51–45 game against the New York Jets. In the first quarter, Green suffered a knee injury and was carted off the field.

In Miami, Green played six more seasons before retiring. He was a member of Don Shula's teams, which were often playoff contenders, and Green was a starter on those teams, racking up 7.5 sacks in 1989, to tie a career-high.
