= Larry Hardy =

Larry Hardy may refer to:

- Larry Hardy (American football) (born 1956), retired American football tight end
- Larry Hardy (baseball) (born 1948), American former pitcher, coach and manager in professional baseball
