= Bill Houston (American football) =

American football player (born 1951)

No. 86
- Position: Wide receiver

Personal information
- Born: August 22, 1951 (age 75); Oxford, Mississippi, U.S.
- Listed height: 6 ft 3 in (1.91 m)
- Listed weight: 208 lb (94 kg)

Career information
- College: Jackson State
- NFL draft: 1974: undrafted

Career history
- Dallas Cowboys (1974); Dallas Cowboys (1976)*
- * Offseason or practice squad member only

Career NFL statistics
- Receptions: 6
- Receiving yards: 72
- Stats at Pro Football Reference

William Glenn Houston (born August 22, 1951) is an American former professional football player who was a wide receiver in the National Football League (NFL) for the Dallas Cowboys. He played college football for the Jackson State Tigers.

== Early life ==
Houston attended Central High School. He enrolled at Northwest Mississippi Community College, where he was a starting wide receiver from 1969 to 1970. He later transferred to Jackson State University.

At the time, he was part of a football program that had future NFL players Walter Payton, Eddie Payton, Robert Brazile, Jackie Slater, Emanuel Zanders, Roscoe Word and Don Reese. Houston was a starter at wide receiver.

== Professional career ==
=== Dallas Cowboys ===
Houston was signed as an undrafted free agent by the Dallas Cowboys after the 1974 NFL draft. He was a backup wide receiver behind Drew Pearson. He was waived on September 9, 1975.

=== Seattle Seahawks ===
On January 23, 1976, he was signed as a free agent by the expansion team Seattle Seahawks. He was released before the start of the season.
