= Jackson State Tigers football =

College football team of Jackson State University

2026 Jackson State Tigers football team
- First season: 1911; 115 years ago
- Athletic director: Ashley Robinson
- Head coach: T. C. Taylor; 4th season, 28–8 (.778)
- Location: Jackson, Mississippi
- Stadium: Mississippi Veterans Memorial Stadium (capacity: 60,000)
- Conference: SWAC
- Division: East
- Colors: Navy blue, white, and light blue
- All-time record: 510–340–22 (.597)
- Bowl record: 3–2 (.600)

Black college national championships
- 1962, 1985, 1996, 2021, 2024

Conference championships
- Mississippi–Louisiana: 1920 MWAA: 1957 SWAC: 1961, 1962, 1972, 1973, 1975, 1980, 1981, 1982, 1985, 1986, 1987, 1988, 1990, 1995, 1996, 2007, 2021, 2022, 2024

Division championships
- SWAC East: 1999, 2007, 2008, 2010, 2011, 2012, 2013, 2021, 2022, 2024, 2025
- Rivalries: Alcorn State (rivalry); Southern (rivalry)
- Fight song: Cheer Boys
- Marching band: Sonic Boom of the South
- Website: www.gojsutigers.com

The Jackson State Tigers football team represents Jackson State University in college football at the NCAA Division I Football Championship Subdivision (FCS) level as a member of the Southwestern Athletic Conference (SWAC).

After joining the Southwestern Athletic Conference (SWAC) in 1958, the program exploded into national prominence. In the 1980s, the program enjoyed its greatest success. Under head coach W. C. Gorden, the Tigers won eight conference championships between 1980 and 1990, including four straight from 1985 to 1988.

Since 1958, Jackson State has won about 25 percent of the conference's football championships (19) and is a perennial powerhouse program among HBCUs. The Tigers have produced 101 professional football players and four Pro Football Hall of Famers: Lem Barney, Walter Payton, Robert Brazile, and Jackie Slater. Only 13 college football teams at any level have produced more Pro Football Hall of Famers than Jackson State.

Jackson State has been named a recipient of the black college national championship five times. In 2023, Tigers placekicker Leilani Armenta became the first woman to score in an HBCU Division I game.

== Classifications ==
- 1958–1969: NAIA
- 1970–1982: NAIA Division I
- 1956–1972: NCAA College Division
- 1973–1976: NCAA Division II
- 1977: NCAA Division I
- 1978–present: NCAA Division I–AA/FCS

== Conference memberships ==
- 1911–1912: Independent
- 1913: Southern Intercollegiate Athletic Conference
- 1914-1934 Independent
- 1935-1940 South Central Athletic Conference
- 1941-1946 Independent
- 1947–1950: South Central Athletic Conference
- 1951: Independent
- 1952–1957: Midwest Athletic Association
- 1958–present: Southwestern Athletic Conference

== JSU fanbase ==
Jackson State is widely noted for its strong football support and culture. Jackson State fans have led the Division I FCS in attendance for multiple seasons and are the 2025 regular-season leaders.

== Championships ==
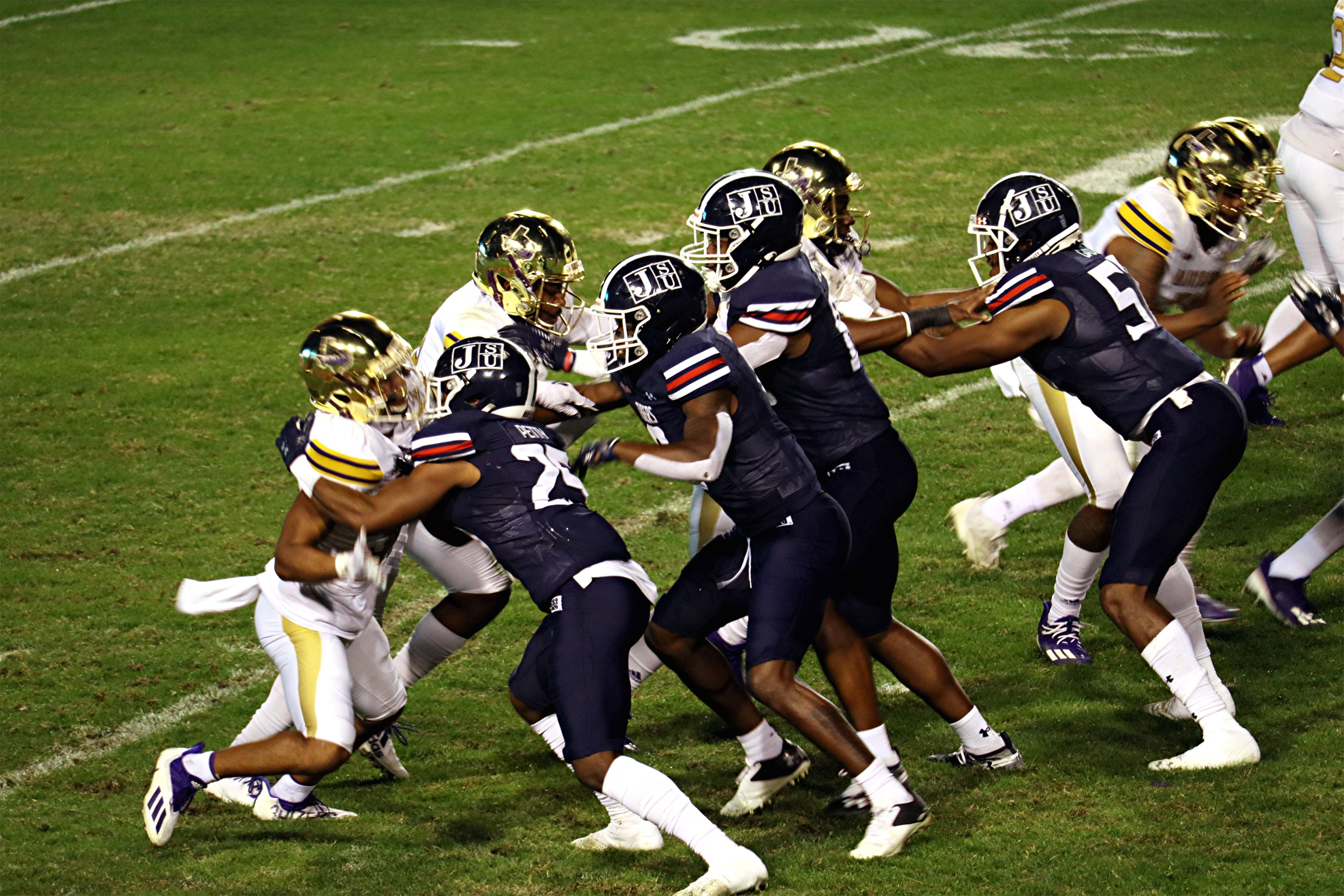
The Tigers playing against the Prairie View A&M Panthers during the 2021 SWAC Football Championship Game

=== National championships ===
Jackson State has been named a recipient of the black college football national championship five times.

Year	Championship	Coach	Overall record
1962	Black college national co-champions	John Merritt	10–1
1985	Black college national co-champions	W. C. Gorden	8–3
1996	Black college national co-champions	James Carson	10–2
2024	Black college national champions	T. C. Taylor	12-2

=== Conference championships ===
Jackson State has earned a total of 21 conference championships and has won the SWAC (Southwestern Athletic Conference) title 19 times since joining in 1958. Conference championships include:

Year	Coach	Conference	Overall record	Conference record
1920	Earnest Richards	Mississippi-Louisiana Conference		
1957	John Merritt	Midwest Athletic Association	6–2	2–0
1961	John Merritt	Southwestern Athletic Conference	9–2	6–1
1962	John Merritt	Southwestern Athletic Conference	10–1	6–1
1972	Robert Hill	Southwestern Athletic Conference	8–3	5–1
1973	Robert Hill	Southwestern Athletic Conference	9–2	5–1
1975	Robert Hill	Southwestern Athletic Conference	7–3	4–2
1980	W. C. Gorden	Southwestern Athletic Conference	8–3	5–1
1981	W. C. Gorden	Southwestern Athletic Conference	9–2–1	5–1
1982	W. C. Gorden	Southwestern Athletic Conference	9–3	6–0
1985	W. C. Gorden	Southwestern Athletic Conference	8–3	6–1
1986	W. C. Gorden	Southwestern Athletic Conference	9–3	7–0
1987	W. C. Gorden	Southwestern Athletic Conference	8–3–1	7–0
1988	W. C. Gorden	Southwestern Athletic Conference	8–1–2	7–0
1990	W. C. Gorden	Southwestern Athletic Conference	8–4	5–1
1995	James Carson	Southwestern Athletic Conference	9–3	7–0
1996	James Carson	Southwestern Athletic Conference	10–2	6–1
2007	Rick Comegy	Southwestern Athletic Conference	8–4	8–2
2021	Deion Sanders	Southwestern Athletic Conference	11-2	8-0
2022	Deion Sanders	Southwestern Athletic Conference	12-1	8-0
2024	T. C. Taylor	Southwestern Athletic Conference	12-2	8-0

=== Division championships ===
The Southwestern Athletic Conference instituted a divisional system for football in 1999. Jackson State plays in the Eastern Division of the conference along with Alabama A&M, Alabama State, Bethune-Cookman, Florida A&M and Mississippi Valley. The SWAC Western Division includes Alcorn State, the University of Arkansas at Pine Bluff, Grambling, Prairie View A&M, Southern University, and Texas Southern. Each season, the SWAC East and SWAC West divisional champions face off in the SWAC Championship Game. Jackson State University claims ten SWAC Eastern Division championships and has won eight outright to advance to the title game.

Year	Coach	Division	Overall record	Conference record	Opponent	Championship Game result
1999	Judge Hughes	SWAC East	8–4	8–2	Southern	L 30–31
2007	Rick Comegy	SWAC East	8–4	8–2	Grambling State	W 42–31
2008	Rick Comegy	SWAC East	7–5	6–1	Grambling State	L 9–41
2010†	Rick Comegy	SWAC East	8–3	6–3	N/A lost tiebreaker to Alabama State ‡	
2011†	Rick Comegy	SWAC East	9–2	7–2	N/A lost tiebreaker to Alabama A&M ^	
2012	Rick Comegy	SWAC East	7–5	7–2	Arkansas–Pine Bluff	L 21–24^{OT}
2013	Rick Comegy	SWAC East	8–4	8–1	Southern	L 27–34^{2OT} (win vacated by Southern^)
2021	Deion Sanders	SWAC East	11–2	8–0	Prairie View A&M	W 27–10
2022	Deion Sanders	SWAC East	12-1	8–0	Southern	W 43–24
2024	T. C. Taylor	SWAC East	12-2	8–0	Southern	W 41–13

† Co–champions

^ win vacated by Southern University due to NCAA violations

== NCAA I-AA/FCS playoff results ==
The Tigers have appeared in the I-AA/FCS playoffs 12 times with a record of 0–12.

Year	Round	Opponent	Result	Source
1978	Semifinals	Florida A&M	L 10–15	
1981	Quarterfinals	Boise State	L 7–19	
1982	First Round	Eastern Illinois	L 13–16	
1985	First Round	Georgia Southern	L 0–27	
1986	First Round	Tennessee State	L 23–32	
1987	First Round	Arkansas State	L 32–35	
1988	First Round	Stephen F. Austin	L 0–24	
1989	First Round	Montana	L 7–48	
1990	First Round	Middle Tennessee	L 7–28	
1995	First Round	Marshall	L 8–38	
1996	First Round	William & Mary	L 6–45	
1997	First Round	Western Illinois	L 24–31	

== Bowl games ==
Season	Bowl	Location	Opponent	Result
1971	Azalea Bowl	Mobile, AL	Alabama A&M	W 40–21
2021	Celebration Bowl	Atlanta, GA	South Carolina State	L 10–31
2022	Celebration Bowl	Atlanta, GA	North Carolina Central	L 34–41 ^{OT}
2024	Celebration Bowl	Atlanta, GA	South Carolina State	W 28-7

== Head coaches ==
Tenure	Coach	Overall record	Conference record	Pct.
1911–1912	John R. Pinkett	0–3	–	.000
1913–1915	Jubie Bragg	3–4	–	.429
1920, 1923	Earnest Richards	3–3	–	.500
1924–1928	Belford Lawson Jr.	2–8	–	.200
1929–1936	Charles Clark	6–24–5	–	.243
1937–1939	John H. Young	3–5–2	–	.400
1939–1951	T. B. Ellis	32–24–1	–	.570
1952–1962	John Merritt	63–37–5	20–8	.624
1963	Edward Clemons	4–5	2–5	.444
1964–1968	Rod Paige	25–19–2	15–18–2	.565
1969–1970	Ulysses S. McPherson	6–13	2–11	.316
1971–1976	Robert Hill	44–15–1	24–9–1	.742
1976–1991	W. C. Gorden	119–48–5	79–21	.706
1992–1998	James "Big Daddy" Carson	54–25–1	38–12–1	.681
1999–2002	Robert "Judge" Hughes	32–13	20–5	.711
2003–2005	James Bell	8–23	7–16	.258
2006–2013	Rick Comegy	55–35	49–19	.611
2014–2015	Harold Jackson	6–11	4–8	.353
2016–2018	Tony Hughes	9–20	8–12	.310
2018–2020	John Hendrick	6–9	5–5	.400
2020–2022	Deion Sanders	27–6	19–2	.818
2023–	T. C. Taylor	19–6	13–3	.760

=== Coach of the Year Honors ===
Year	Coach	Honor
1961	John Merritt	SWAC Coach of the Year
1961	John Merritt	National Black College Coach of the Year
1962	John Merritt	SWAC Coach of the Year
1962	John Merritt	National Black College Coach of the Year
1971	Robert Hill	SWAC Coach of the Year
1982	W. C. Gorden	SWAC Coach of the Year
1985	W. C. Gorden	SWAC Coach of the Year
1986	W. C. Gorden	SWAC Coach of the Year
1987	W. C. Gorden	SWAC Coach of the Year
1988	W. C. Gorden	SWAC Coach of the Year
1995	James Carson	SWAC Coach of the Year
2007	Rick Comegy	SWAC Coach of the Year
2021	Deion Sanders	SWAC Coach of the Year
2022	Deion Sanders	SWAC Coach of the Year
2024	T. C. Taylor	SWAC Coach of the Year

== Rivalries ==
During the early years of Jackson State's football history, rivalries were established with in-state foes Rust College and Tougaloo. Stillman College was also a common opponent which brought excitement and high interest to games played at the Mississippi Fairgrounds and later at Alumni Field on the campus of Jackson State. Since then, JSU has formed several traditional rivalries with long-time foes.

== All-Americans ==
Over 50 Jackson State players have been named All-Americans.

Year	Position	Player	Honor				
1962	WR	Willie Richardson	AP Little All-American				
1967	WR	Harold Jackson	Pittsburg Courier All-American				
1969	OL	Joe Stephens	AP Little All-American				
1971	WR	Jerome Barkum	AP Little All-American				
1973	RB	Walter Payton	Chevrolet - Mutual Black Network All-American				
1974	RB	Walter Payton	Chevrolet - Mutual Black Network All-American				
1974	LB	Robert Brazile	Chevrolet - Mutual Black Network All-American				
1975	RB	Walter Payton	Chevrolet - Mutual Black Network All-American				
1975	LB	Robert Brazile	Chevrolet - Mutual Black Network All-American				
1976	WR	Leon Sherrod	Mutual Black Network All-American Team				
1977	OL	Louis Bullard	Mutual Black Network All-American Team				
1977	RB	Ricky Patton	Mutual Black Network All-American Team				
1977	CB	Charles Williams	Mutual Black Network All-American Team				
1979	RB	Perry Harrington	Sheridan All-American Team				
1980	C	Tom Rice	Sheridan All-American Team				
1980	G	Larry Werts	Sheridan All-American Team				
1981	G	Michael Field	Sheridan All-American Team				
1981	RB	Larry Cowan	Sheridan All-American Team				
1989	OL	Tim Brown	Sheridan All-American Team				
1989	--	Ike Ayozie	Sheridan All-American Team				
1989	LB	Darion Conner	Div. I-AA First Team All-American				
1989	--	Fred McCrae	Sheridan All-American Team				
1991	OL	Deitrich Lockridge	Div. I-AA First Team All-American				
1991	TE	Harold Heath	Div. I-AA All-American				
1991	DB	Isaac Morehouse	Div. I-AA All-American				
1991	LB	Charles Ray Davis	Sheridan All-American Team				
1992	OL	Lester Holmes	Div. I-AA First Team All-American				
1992	TE	Isiah Bliss	Sheridan All-American Team				
1992	OL	Lester Holmes	Sheridan All-American Team				
1992	LB	Mario Perry	Sheridan All-American Team				
1993	LB	Fernando Smith	Div. I-AA All-American				
1995	DB	Picasso Nelson	Sheridan All-American				
1996	DB	Sean Woodson	Div. I-AA First Team All-American				
1996	LB	Otha Evans	Div. I-AA All-American				
1999	RB	Destry Wright	Div. I-AA All-American				
1999	WR	Sylvester Morris	Div. I-AA All-American				
1999	DL	Eric Chandler	Div. I-AA All-American				
2011	DL	Joseph Lebeau	FCS All-American				
2011	DL	Joseph Lebeau	Boxtorow All-American				
2011	QB	Casey Therriault	Boxtorow All-American				
2011	TE	Renty Rollins	Boxtorow All-American				
2012	WR	Rico Richardson	Sheridan All-American Team				
2012	WR	Rico Richardson	Boxtorow All-American				
2012	DL	Joseph LeBeau	Sheridan All-American Team				
2012	DL	Joseph LeBeau	Boxtorow All-American				
2012	DB	Qua Cox	Boxtorow All-American				
2013	OL	Jordan Arthur	Boxtorow All-American				
2013	DB	Qua Cox	Boxtorow All-American	2013	DL	Javancy Jones	Freshman All-American Team
2014	DL	Javancy Jones	Boxtorow All-American Team	2015	PK	Ryan Deising	Sheridan All-American Team
2015	DL	Javancy Jones	Sheridan All-American Team				
2015	DL	Javancy Jones	Boxtorow All-American				
2016	DL	Javancy Jones	Sheridan All-American Team				
2021	DL	James Houston	Associated Press FCS All-American Team				
2022	OL	Tyler Brown	Associated Press FCS All-American Team				
2022	DL	Aubrey Miller Jr.	Associated Press FCS All-American Team				

== Player of the Year ==
Jackson State players that received Player of the Year honors.

Year	Position	Player	Honor	Ref.
1971	Sylvester Collins	QB	SWAC Offensive Player of the Year	
1973	Walter Payton	RB	SWAC Player of the Year	
1973	Walter Payton	RB	Chevrolet - Mutual Black Network Player of the Year	
1974	Walter Payton	RB	Chevrolet - Mutual Black Network Player of the Year	
1977	Jessie Griffin	LB	SWAC Defensive Player of the Year	
1979	Perry Harrington	RB	SWAC Offensive Player of the Year	
1980	Larry Werts	LB	SWAC Defensive Player of the Year	
1981	Keith Taylor	QB	SWAC Offensive Player of the Year	
1982	Mario Kirksey	LB	SWAC Defensive Player of the Year	
1985	Jackie Walker	LB	SWAC Defensive Player of the Year	
1985	Daryl Jones	RB	SWAC Newcomer of the Year	
1986	Kevin Dent	DB	SWAC Defensive Player of the Year	
1987	Lewis Tillman	RB	SWAC Offensive Player of the Year	
1987	Andre Lloyd	LB	SWAC Defensive Player of the Year	
1988	Kevin Dent	DB	SWAC Defensive Player of the Year	
1988	Lewis Tillman	RB	SWAC Offensive Player of the Year	
1989	Darion Conner	LB	SWAC Defensive Player of the Year	
1989	Ike Ayozie	K	SWAC Newcomer of the Year	
1990	Marlo Perry	LB	SWAC Freshman of the Year	
1995	Picasso Nelson	LB	SWAC Newcomer of the Year	
1996	Sean Woodson	DB	SWAC Offensive Player of the Year	
1997	Corey Bradford	WR	SWAC Newcomer of the Year	
1998	Sylvester Morris	WR	SWAC Offensive Player of the Year	
1999	Tommy Head	LB	SWAC Defensive Player of the Year	
2000	Robert Kent	QB	SWAC Newcomer of the Year	
2002	Terry Ross	WR	SWAC Freshman of the Year	
2008	Marcellus Speaks	DL	SWAC Defensive Player of the Year	
2008	Marcellus Speaks	DL	Boxtorow Defensive Player of the Year	
2010	Casey Therriault	QB	SWAC Newcomer of the Year	
2010	Casey Therriault	QB	Boxtorow Newcomer of the Year	
2011	Casey Therriault	QB	SWAC Offensive Player of the Year	
2011	Casey Therriault	QB	Boxtorow National Player of the Year	
2011	Joseph LeBeau	DE	SWAC Newcomer of the Year	
2012	Rico Richardson	WR	SWAC Offensive Player of the Year	
2013	Javancy Jones	DL	SWAC Freshman of the Year	
2019	Keonte Hampton	LB	SWAC Defensive Player of the Year	
2021	Shedeur Sanders	QB	Boxtorow Newcomer of the Year	
2022	Shedeur Sanders	QB	SWAC Offensive Player of the Year	
2022	Aubrey Miller Jr.	LB	SWAC Defensive Player of the Year	
2022	Shedeur Sanders	QB	Boxtorow Offensive Player of the Year	
2022	Aubrey Miller Jr.	LB	Boxtorow Defensive Player of the Year	
2024	Irv Mulligan	RB	SWAC Offensive Player of the Year	
2024	Travis Terrell Jr.	RB	SWAC Freshman of the Year	
2024	Travis Terrell Jr.	RB	Boxtorow Newcomer of the Year	

== College Football Hall of Fame members ==
- Kevin Dent
- W. C. Gorden
- John Merritt
- Walter Payton
- Willie Richardson
- Robert Brazile

== Pro football alumni ==
See: List of Jackson State Tigers in the NFL draft

As of 2017, Jackson State has produced over 90 pro football players including four who have been inducted into the Pro Football Hall of Fame and 16 who have been selected to play in the Pro Bowl. Notable players include:

Player	Position	Draft	Pick	Team	Seasons	Notes
Lem Barney*	CB	1967	2-34	Detroit Lions	11	Pro Football Hall of Fame*, 7× Pro Bowler, Defensive Rookie of the Year
Walter Payton*	RB	1975	1-4	Chicago Bears	13	Pro Football Hall of Fame*, League MVP, number retired, 9× Pro Bowler, 1994 all-time NFL team, 2019 all-time NFL team
Robert Brazile*	LB	1975	1-6	Houston Oilers	10	Pro Football Hall of Fame*, 7× Pro Bowler, Defensive Rookie of the Year
Jackie Slater*	OT	1976	3-86	Los Angeles Rams	20	Pro Football Hall of Fame*, 7× Pro Bowler, number retired
Jimmy Smith	WR	1992	2-36	Dallas Cowboys	12	5× Pro Bowler
Harold Jackson	WR-FL	1968	12-323	Los Angeles Rams	16	5× Pro Bowler
Leon Gray	T-G	1973	3-78	Miami Dolphins	11	4× Pro Bowler
Leslie "Speedy" Duncan	DB	1964	--	San Diego Chargers	11	3× AFL All-Star, 1× NFL Pro Bowler
Verlon Biggs	DE	1965	3-20	New York Jets (AFL)	10	3× AFL All-Star
Rich Caster	TE-WR	1970	2-46	New York Jets	13	3× Pro Bowler
Coy Bacon	DE-DT	1964	Undrafted		14	3× Pro Bowler
Willie Richardson	DE-DT	1963	3-19	New York Jets	9	2× Pro Bowler
Wilbert Montgomery	RB	1977	6-154	Philadelphia Eagles	9	2× Pro Bowler, Eagles Hall of Fame
Ben McGee	DE-DT	1964	4-51	Pittsburgh Steelers	9	2× Pro Bowler
Jerome Barkum	TE-WR	1972	1-9	New York Jets	12	1× Pro Bowler (1973)
Sylvester Stamps	RB-WR	1984	--	Atlanta Falcons	6	1× Pro Bowler (1987)
Al Greer	E	1963	18-251	Detroit Lions	1	
Roy Curry	WR	1963	12-164	Pittsburgh Steelers	1	
Gloster Richardson	WR	1965	7-50	Kansas City Chiefs	1	2× Super Bowl Champion, 1× AFL Champion
Roy Hilton	DE	1965	15-210	Baltimore Colts	11	
Jim Hayes	DT-DE	1963	--	Houston Oilers	2	
Frank Molden	DT	1965	5-34	Pittsburgh Steelers	1	
Dan Pride	LB	1966	10-90	Chicago Bears	1	
Taft Reed	DB	1966	--	Philadelphia Eagles	1	
Robert "Judge" Hughes	T	1967	6-153	Philadelphia Eagles	3	
Claudis James	WR-HB	1967	14-366	Green Bay Packers	2	
Al Coleman	DB	1967	4-87	Minnesota Vikings	6	
Tom Funchess	T	1968	2-32	Boston Patriots	7	
John Outlaw	DB	1968	10-249	New England Patriots	10	
Jim Holifield	DB	1968	12-314	New York Giants	2	
Richard Harvey	DB	1969	8-203	Los Angeles Rams	2	
Tom Richardson	WR	1969	--	Boston Patriots	2	
Ed Hardy	G	1972	7-175	San Francisco 49ers	1	
Eddie Payton	RB	1973	Undrafted		5	1980 NFL leader in kick returns
Don Reese	DT-DE	1974	1-26	Miami Dolphins	7	
Ernie Richardson	TE	1974	--	Cleveland Browns	1	
Roscoe Word	DB	1974	3-74	New York Jets	3	
Emanuel Zanders	T	1974	--	New Orleans Saints	8	
Bill Houston	WR	1974	--	Dallas Cowboys	1	
John Tate	LB	1975	8-183	New York Giants	1	
Rod Phillips	RB	1975	--	Los Angeles Rams	6	
Rickey Young	RB	1975	7-164	San Diego Chargers	9	1978 NFL leader in receptions (88)
Oakley Dalton	DT	1977	12-315	New Orleans Saints	1	
Mike Jones	LB	1977	--	Seattle Seahawks	1	
Larry Franklin	WR	1978	--	Tampa Bay Buccaneers	1	
Louis Bullard	T	1978	5-119	Seattle Seahawks	3	
Charles Williams	DB	1978	9-230	Philadelphia Eagles	1	
Ricky Patton	RB	1978	10-257	Atlanta Falcons	7	
Larry Hardy	TE	1978	12-309	New Orleans Saints	8	
Jeff Moore	RB	1979	12-319	Seattle Seahawks	6	
Robert Hardy	DT	1979	10-267	Seattle Seahawks	1	
Vernon Perry	DB	1979	--	Houston Oilers	5	
Perry Harrington	RB	1980	2-53	Philadelphia Eagles	6	
James Marshall	DB	1980	--	New Orleans Saints	1	
Buster Barnett	TE	1981	11-299	Buffalo Bills	4	
Larry Cowan	RB	1982	7-192	Miami Dolphins	1	
Thomas Strauthers	DE-DT	1983	10-258	Philadelphia Eagles	8	
Cleo Simmons	RB	1983	--	Dallas Cowboys	1	
Dave Windham	LB	1984	10-258	Washington Redskins	1	
Chris Burkett	WR	1985	2-42	Buffalo Bills	11	
Jackie Walker	LB-TE	1986	2-28	Tampa Bay Buccaneers	4	
James Harvey	G-T	1987	--	Kansas City Chiefs	2	
Steve Martin	DE	1987	--	Washington Redskins	1	
Ladell Willis	LB	1987	--	New York Jets	1	
Frank Sutton	T	1987	--	New York Giants	1	
Leon Seals	DE	1987	4-109	Buffalo Bills	6	
Reggie Carr	DE	1987	Undrafted		1	
Stacey Mobley	WR	1987	--	Los Angeles Rams	2	
Fred Molden	DT	1987	--	Minnesota Vikings	1	
Bobby Curtis	LB	1987	--	Washington Redskins	1	
Roy Bennett	DB	1988	--	San Diego Chargers	2	
Houston Hoover	G-T	1988	6-140	Atlanta Falcons	7	
Lewis Tillman	RB	1989	4-93	New York Giants	7	
Darion Conner	LB	1990	2-27	Atlanta Falcons	8	
Tim Barnett	WR	1991	3-77	Kansas City Chiefs	3	
Paul McJulien	P	1991	--	Green Bay Packers	3	
Lester Holmes	G	1993	1-19	Philadelphia Eagles	8	
Fernando Smith	DE	1994	2-55	Minnesota Vikings	7	
Marlo Perry	LB	1994	3-81	Buffalo Bills	6	
Robert Staten	RB	1996	--	Tampa Bay Buccaneers	1	
Eric Austin	DB	1996	4-104	Tampa Bay Buccaneers	1	
Toby Myles	T	1998	5-147	New York Giants	4	
Corey Bradford	WR	1998	5-150	Green Bay Packers	9	25 career receiving TDs
Sylvester Morris	WR	2000	1-21	Kansas City Chiefs	2	
Rashard Anderson	DB	2000	1-23	Carolina Panthers	2	
Robert Kent	QB	2004	--	Tennessee Titans	--	
Cletis Gordon	DB/WR	2006	--	San Diego Chargers	5	
Jaymar Johnson	WR	2008	6th Round	Minnesota Vikings	3	
D. J. Johnson	DB	2009	--	New York Giants	3	
Marcus Benard	LB	2009	Undrafted		5	
Domonique Johnson	DB	2009	Undrafted		4	
Casey Therriault	QB	2013	--	New Yorker Lions	5	2× EuroBowl MVP
Rico Richardson	RB	2013	--	Kansas City Chiefs	4	
Daniel Williams	WR	2017	--	New York Jets	--	
James Houston IV	LB	2022	6-217	Detroit Lions	--	
Isaiah Bolden	CB	2023	7-245	New England Patriots	--	

== Economic impact ==
In 2021, Jackson State football was responsible for having a $30 million positive economic impact on Jackson's economy. Jackson State's football program is considered the most powerful in the Division I FCS in regards to generating a notable economic impact and drawing public interest.

== Facilities ==
Jackson State University owns and operates Mississippi Veterans Memorial Stadium affectionately known as "The Vet". The 60,492-seat stadium has been the home field of Jackson State football since 1970. For many years, the stadium was the largest in Mississippi until 2016. In 2024, The Vet won the championship in the College Football Campus Tour Best FCS Stadium Invitational, beating out the Kibbie Dome in Idaho in the title round with 58% of nearly 12,000 votes.

== Future non-conference opponents ==
Announced schedules as of February 1, 2026

2026	2027	2028
at Tennessee State^{1}	Tennessee State	vs Norfolk State^{2}
Edward Waters		
Tuskegee		

1. John A. Merritt Classic
2. MEAC/SWAC Challenge, Atlanta, GA
