= James Carson (American football) =

American football player and coach (1940–1999)

Biographical details
- Born: February 25, 1940; Clarksdale, Mississippi, U.S.
- Died: October 7, 1999 (aged 59); Jackson, Mississippi, U.S.

Playing career
- c. 1959–1962: Jackson State
- Positions: Offensive guard, nose tackle

Coaching career (HC unless noted)
- 1963–1964: Rust (assistant)
- 1965–1967: Alabama A&M (assistant)
- 1968–1974: South Carolina State (assistant)
- 1975–1976: South Carolina State (DC)
- 1979–1991: Jackson State (DC)
- 1992–1998: Jackson State

Head coaching record
- Overall: 54–25–1
- Tournaments: 0–3 (NCAA D-I-AA playoffs)

Accomplishments and honors

Championships
- 1 black college national (1996); 2 SWAC (1995–1996)

James "Big Daddy" Carson Jr. (February 25, 1940 – October 7, 1999) was an American college football coach. He served as the head football coach of Jackson State University in Jackson, Mississippi from 1992 to 1998, compiling a record of 54–25–1. Carson's Jackson State Tigers won a black college football national championship in 1996 and back-to-back Southwestern Athletic Conference (SWAC) titles in 1995 and 1996. They appeared in the NCAA Division I-AA Football Championship playoffs three consecutive years from 1995 to 1997.

A native of Clarksdale, Mississippi, Carson played college football as an offensive guard and nose tackle at Jackson State, garnering All-NAIA honorable mention honors in 1962. His son, Ricardo, played football at the school from 1991 to 1994.

Carson stepped down from his post at Jackson State in May 1999 after undergoing intestinal surgery the previous month. He was succeeded as head coach by Judge Hughes. Carson died on October 7, 1999, at his home in Jackson.

== Head coaching record ==
Year	Team	Overall	Conference	Standing	Bowl/playoffs	TSN^{#}
Jackson State Tigers (Southwestern Athletic Conference) (1992–1998)
1992	Jackson State	7–4	4–3	3rd		
1993	Jackson State	5–5–1	3–3–1	T–4th		
1994	Jackson State	7–4	4–3	4th		
1995	Jackson State	9–3	7–0	1st	L NCAA Division I-AA First Round	14
1996	Jackson State	10–2	6–1	1st	L NCAA Division I-AA First Round	T–8
1997	Jackson State	9–3	7–1	2nd	L NCAA Division I-AA First Round	14
1998	Jackson State	7–4	7–1	2nd		
Jackson State:		54–25–1	38–12–1			
Total:		54–25–1				
National championship Conference title Conference division title or championship game berth
