= Vicksburg High School (Mississippi) =

Coordinates: 32.3216°N 90.8862°W

Location
- 3701 Drummond Street; Vicksburg, Mississippi 39183

Information
- School type: Public
- Established: 1958
- School district: Vicksburg Warren School District
- Superintendent: Toriano Holloway
- Principal: Robert Lamkin
- Teaching staff: 59.55 (FTE)
- Grades: 9-12
- Enrollment: 785 (2024-2025)
- Student to teacher ratio: 13.18
- Colors: Kelly green and white
- Mascot: Gators
- Website: https://www.vwsd.org/o/vhs

Vicksburg High School is in Vicksburg, Mississippi. It is at 3701 Drummond Street. As of 2023 the school has about 714 students. The student body is about 85 percent African American, 10 percent white, and 2 percent hispanic. One hundred percent of the students are listed as economically disadvantaged. The school has low test scores. In 2023 the high school scores a B grade from the Mississippi Department of Education.

Gators are the school mascot and the school colors are green and white. The school competes in the Mississippi High School Activities Association as part of the Big Eight League. It has rivalries with Warren Central High School and Murrah High School.

Robert Lamkin is the school's principal. Kristin Chapman helped lead the Missy Gators soccer team to state championships in 1996, 1998, and 1999.

== History ==
H. G. H. Bowman High School and then Rosa A. Temple High School served Vicksburg's African American students during segregation. Temple High School closed in 1971 in the wake of desegregation.

In 1982, the school received national coverage after it began offering a course on the Mississippi River.

== Alumni ==
- Mychal Ammons, basketball player
- Richard Blackmore, football player
- Malcolm Butler, NFL player and Super Bowl champion
- Roosevelt Brown, baseball player
- Kevin Dent, football defensive back who was inducted into the College Football Hall of Fame
- Trina Frierson, basketball player and coach
- James Jones (running back, born 1958)
- Michael Myers, football player
- Mark Smith, football player
- Sylvester Stamps, football player

== See also ==
- Vicksburg-Warren School District
