= Homer Vernon Cooper =

American politician (1890-1968)

- H.V. Cooper, circa 1960

Member of the Mississippi State Senate from the 12th district
- In office January 19, 1960 – December 31, 1963
- Preceded by: Hayden Campbell
- Succeeded by: Ellis B. Bodron (13th)
- Constituency: Warren and Hinds Counties

Personal details
- Born: Homer Vernon Cooper; May 12, 1890 Tallassee, Alabama, U.S.
- Died: June 22, 1968 (aged 78) Vicksburg, Mississippi, U.S.
- Party: Democratic
- Spouse(s): Fronie Lee Basinger Cooper; Annie Laurie Griffin Cooper
- Children: 2
- Education: Southern Christian College (AAeD); Mississippi State University (BS); University of Virginia (MS)
- Profession: educator school superintendent
- Nickname: H.V. Cooper

Military service
- Allegiance: United States
- Branch/service: United States Army; Mississippi Army National Guard
- Years of service: 1926–1929
- Rank: Captain
- Unit: 155th Infantry Regiment

Homer Vernon Cooper (May 12, 1890 – June 22, 1968) was an American politician who served as a State Senator from the 12th District which had represented the area of Warren and Hinds Counties in Mississippi. He was a Democrat who served from 1960 to 1964. By profession, Cooper was a longtime school administrator well known on the state and national levels.

Cooper opposed integration of the Vicksburg school system and desegregation of the educational structure across Mississippi; this was in defiance to the Supreme Court ruling in Brown v. Board of Education. He served on the Mississippi State Sovereignty Commission and voted for supporting the commission during his term as a State Senator.

== Early life and education ==
Homer Vernon Cooper was born into a farming family in Elmore County, Alabama, on May 12, 1890. He was the fifth of eight children born to John Thomas Cooper and Dorothy Arizona Hornsby (5 boys and 3 girls). Cooper attended elementary school in Eclectic, Alabama, before the family moved northwest to near Oxford, Mississippi; by 1908 Cooper would complete his high school education at an institution known as Toccopola College School, (Toccopola, Mississippi).

== Career in Education and Public life ==
Starting when he was 22 years old, H.V. Cooper eventually became a prominent leader in Mississippi education. From 1912 to 1915, Cooper first served as a teacher and principal of Cedar Bluff Elementary School (Cedarbluff, Mississippi). During the same time he continued his higher education at Southern Christian College in West Point, Mississippi, completing his Associate of Arts in Education degree in 1915. 1917-18 he served as a social science teacher at Kilmichael (Mississippi) High School; in 1920 he completed his Bachelor of Science in Education degree at Mississippi State University in Starkville having also served there in 1919 as an instructor in Education and Sociology. Cooper then served as Superintendent of Schools in Ackerman from 1920 to 1922. He moved his family south to Magnolia serving as Superintendent of Schools until 1924, and moved back north working in Kosciusko thereafter until 1931. During this time, Cooper served in the Mississippi National Guard from 1926 thru 1929 as Captain for the 155th Infantry Regiment in Kosciusko and also stationed in Biloxi, Mississippi. Starting in Summer of 1927, he was enrolled in the graduate extension program at the University of Virginia. He went onto to earn a Master of Science in Education degree in 1932 from the UVA. His thesis on public education administration is cited in numerous publications during the 1930s and 1940s.

After completion of his graduate work, Cooper was named Superintendent of Schools in Vicksburg, Mississippi, a post he held for 29 years until reaching compulsory retirement later in 1960 (age of 70). He would then go onto working for All Saints' College as guidance counselor and also director of extension work in summers at Mississippi State University. He was a Life Member and Past President of Mississippi Education Association; Life Member and Member of Board of Directors of the NEA; member of the American Association of School Administrators, Mississippi Association of School Administrators and served as Chairman of Education Policies Commission of the M.E.A.

While remaining in Vicksburg for the rest of his life, Cooper became a well known civic leader. He served as a President and District Governor of Rotary International; a member of the Delta Council, Mississippi Economic Council and Vicksburg Chamber of Commerce. He was a member of the Masons and Shriners.

== 1960 - 1964, Mississippi State Senator ==
At the age of 70 in 1960, H.V. Cooper become a Senator representing the 12th District of the State if Mississippi. The 12th Mississippi Senate district covered both Warren and Hinds counties; both the Vicksburg and Jackson metro areas. The district was represented and shared by three senate seats; Cooper would replace Hayden Campbell who was running against long-time Jackson lawyer, Senator T. Mitchell Robinson for the Hinds County seat. Campbell had occupied what was the 'floater' seat of the three. Robinson lost the Hinds seat to Campbell after finalizing legislation and funding for the complicated Pearl River Valley Reservoir Project. Cooper was long time superintendent of Vicksburg Public Schools and with close ties to business, municipal and church leaders in Warren County, Mississippi, he was a well known commodity by the citizens of the 12th district and throughout the state. Cooper worked on numerous committees to include being Chairman of Municipalities; Vice-chairman of Child Welfare, Commerce and Manufacturing, Education and a member for committees on County Affairs, Penitentiaries, and Universities and Colleges.

=== Support and legislation for education ===
As a longtime teaching and school administrator, Cooper was a tenacious fighter in his support for the education system throughout Mississippi. In March 1960, one of the first major pieces of legislation he was able to help push through was a substantial salary increase for K-12 teachers. Mississippi lagged far behind the rest of the country in this regard. Another one of the most important initiatives Cooper was charged with was chairing and being main author of a major 1961 report on the education system in the state of Mississippi. While serving as State senator he was very vocal about education in Mississippi and federal mandates handed down from the Eisenhower, Kennedy and Johnson administrations.

=== Redistricting legislative seats in Mississippi ===
Cooper served one term and his seat was basically eliminated by the realignment of Senate districts starting in the 1964 legislative session. Cooper had originally proposed a redistricting plan in 1962 that would better represent the political layout of districts in Mississippi. Due to the shifting populations of both Vicksburg and Jackson, each metro area required their own Senate representatives without having 'floaters.' Warren County would become its own district (13th), singularly represented by longtime Senator Ellis B. Bodron and Hinds County (1st) represented now by Senator Hayden Campbell. The 12th district would become Sunflower County located just to the north. This was the first reapportionment since the adoption the 1890 Mississippi state constitution.

In August 1966, Cooper was defeated in a runoff for the state House during a special election for Warren County to fill the seat vacated by Billy Joe Cross. His brother, Donald Cross, went onto be the victor in that race.

=== Other work related to Mississippi ===
His work and influence extended through his tenure as a state senator to help initiatives important to the Vicksburg community and state of Mississippi. In the late 1950s and into the 1960s, Cooper was able to facilitate funding and support for the raising and the restoration for the American ironclad warship, USS Cairo. This was done through the War Between the States Commission which Cooper was appointed to head kicking off the 100 anniversary of the war. He also served as the chairman of the "Operation Cairo" committee, as it was an important historical project for Cooper as an educator and part time historian of the American South.

=== Mississippi State Sovereignty Commission ===
==== 1959 ====
Starting in 1956, newly elected Governor James P. Coleman formed the Mississippi State Sovereignty Commission. Early in February 1959, Kosciusko lawyer George J. Thornton resigned his post on the commission to accept a position with the Mississippi State Oil and Gas Board. By February 25, Homer Vernon Cooper was fully installed by outgoing Governor Coleman, filling Thornton's seat for the next 11 months with '"one of the outstanding school superintendents in the State of Mississippi" — H. V. Cooper of Vicksburg.' A May 7, 1959, memo from MSSC director Maurice Malone to Cooper shows the dual purpose of the commission to support specific African-American media they felt shined a good light on MSSC activities (Cooper comments on the two newly built, segregated Vicksburg High Schools not being mentioned). Meetings H.V. Cooper attended and cast votes on included the funding of Chief Investigator Zach VanLandingham (July 16, 1959). In one 1959 memorandum, VanLandingham, tells of a conversation he had with Hattiesburg lawyer Dudley Connor, about Civil Rights activist Clyde Kennard. "If the Sovereignty Commission wanted that Negro out of the community and out of the state they would take care of the situation," Mr. VanLandingham quoted Mr. Connor as saying. "And when asked what he meant by that, Mr. Connor stated that Kennard's car could be hit by a train or he could have some accident on the highway and nobody would ever know the difference." Cooper's tenure on the commission was limited to two quarterly meetings where a quorum was present (July and October). The next Governor of Mississippi (Ross R. Barnett 1960–1964), appointed a new set of commission members to serve under his aegis. This set of commissioners did not include H.V. Cooper. Twenty documents directly related to H.V. Cooper and the commission are found in the Sovereignty Commission archives online.

==== 1960-1964 ====
Under the new administration of Governor Barnett, 1960 thru 1964 became the zenith of activity for the Mississippi State Sovereignty Commission. H.V. Cooper cast votes for and was part of a legislative session that doubled bi-annual funding of the commission from $250,000 to $500,000. With taxpayer monies, the Mississippi State Sovereignty Commission funded and supported notorious, pro-segregationist policies and activities through local and statewide organizations to include White Citizens' Councils; these groups would prove to be directly related to the KKK. Roughly half of the commission members were also on Citizens' Councils. Two of the most conspicuous low points of the 1960/64 Governor Barnett tenure and legislative support of the commission; the June 12, 1963, assassination of Medgar Evers with subsequent legal support of Byron De La Beckwith and the June 21, 1964 murder three civil rights workers. Files and paperwork of the Mississippi State Sovereignty Commission closely related to the Mississippi Legislature during that era were unsealed in March 1998.

== Legacy ==
H.V. Cooper High School was built in 1958 and named was dedicated in April 1959 to the longtime superintendent of Vicksburg schools, Homer Vernon Cooper. U.S. Senator John Stennis delivered the dedication speech at that ceremony. The high school was an all white/caucasian, segregated school; that same year Rosa A. Temple High School was built which was all Black. Mississippi and Vicksburg did this in defiance of the 1954 Brown v. Board of Education U.S. Supreme Court ruling. Cooper was a staunch supporter of racial segregation in the schools he oversaw in Vicksburg. He consistently voted against the integration of public schools as the representative for the state of Mississippi to the National Education Association at the national level. After Civil Rights legislation of the mid 1960s and Cooper's passing in 1968, H.V. Cooper High School was integrated in 1973/74 and combined with Rosa A. Temple High School with the name changed to Vicksburg High School.

== Personal life, death, honors and descendants ==
Cooper married Fronie Lee Basinger on September 18, 1912, and together, they had two sons. Basinger died in 1963 and Cooper remarried Annie Laurie Griffin on July 30, 1965. He was an amateur golfer and a fan of the "Gashouse Gang", St. Louis Cardinals baseball team which won the 1934 World Series. Cooper died at home in Vicksburg, Mississippi, from a heart attack on June 22, 1968, at the age of 78.

In 1964 he received the Man of the Year Award of the Vicksburg Junior Chamber of Commerce for his contribution in civic life, and in particular for his work as chairman of the advisory committee of the Vicksburg Chamber of Commerce.

Cooper was honored by Millsaps College in 1967 with their Citizens Award during the year end convocation.

An Award of Merit was conferred on the Cairo project by the American Association for State and Local History which Cooper was the chair and driving force to see its completion.

Notable descendants of H.V. Cooper are his oldest son Homer Vernon Cooper Jr. who obtained one of the first aeronautical engineering degrees in the U.S. from Mississippi State University in 1937. He served with Bell Aircraft during World War II and went onto be one of the design/test engineers for the Bell X-1 and future X planes. He eventually would become one of the main aerospace test design engineers for North American Aviation/Rockwell International, appointed as the lead engineer for the interior of the Apollo command and service module redesigning the escape hatches after the January 27, 1967 Apollo tragedy. His grandchildren Cathy Cooper and Jack Cooper are notable artists and musicians.

== See also ==
- Mississippi State Senate
- Mississippi State Capitol
- Mississippi Legislature
- Mississippi State Sovereignty Commission
