= Natchez High School =

Location
- 323 Seargent S. Prentiss Drive; Natchez, Adams, Mississippi 39120; United States
- Coordinates: 31.55122°N 91.36831°W

Information
- Former names: Margaret Martin High School
- Type: Public secondary school
- Motto: Destined to Rise and Determined to Succeed
- Established: 1927
- School district: Natchez-Adams School District
- NCES District ID: 2803030
- Superintendent: Zandra McDonald
- School code: MS-0130-0130044
- CEEB code: 252102
- NCES School ID: 280303000608
- Principal: Angela Reynolds
- Faculty: 49.97 (on an FTE basis)
- Grades: 9–12
- Enrollment: 606 (2024–2025)
  - Grade 9: 155
  - Grade 10: 164
  - Grade 11: 160
  - Grade 12: 127
- Student to teacher ratio: 1:12.13
- Campus type: Rural, fringe
- Colors: blue and gold
- Nickname: Bulldogs
- Website: www.natchezadamsschooldistrict.org/apps/pages/index.jsp?uREC_ID=1465316&type=d&pREC_ID=1621689

Natchez High School is a public high school in Natchez, Mississippi, United States. It is part of the Natchez-Adams School District and serves students in grades nine through twelve.

== History ==
The former location of Natchez High School was at 64 Homochitto Street. Also known as Margaret Martin High School, it was a public high school "for white students-only". It was built in 1927, a few years after the Brumfield School, a K-12 public school for African American students.

== Admissions ==
There were 606 students enrolled at Natchez High during the 2024–25 school year. The gender makeup of the school was 51% female and 49% male. The racial makeup of the school was 88.6% Black, 5.8% white, and 0.5% Hispanic.

In 2005, it had 1,358 students and 73 teachers. 88% of the students were African-American, and the remainder were white.

There were 1,169 students enrolled at Natchez High during the 2006–07 school year. The gender makeup of the school was 52% female and 48% male. The racial makeup of the school was 90.4% black, 9.3% white, and 0.3% Hispanic.

== Campus ==
As of 2017, the school district was considering building a new campus for the high school and converting the former campus into a middle school.

== Notable alumni ==
- Allen Brown, former NFL player
- Paige Cothren, former NFL player
- Terry W. Gee, member of the Louisiana House of Representatives from 1980 to 1992
- Justin Hamilton, NFL player
- Charlie Kempinska, former NFL player
- Bob Dearing, member of the Mississippi Senate
- Perry Lee Dunn, former NFL player
- Lynda Lee Mead, Miss America 1960
- Mike Morgan, former NFL player
- James "Buster" Poole (1915–1994), NFL football player
- Rico Richardson, former NFL player
- James Williams, former NFL player
