= Charlie Kempinska =

American football player (1938–2019)

No. 67
- Position: Guard

Personal information
- Born: October 30, 1938; Natchez, Mississippi, U.S.
- Died: December 7, 2019 (aged 81); Natchez, Mississippi, U.S.
- Listed height: 6 ft 2 in (1.88 m)
- Listed weight: 235 lb (107 kg)

Career information
- High school: Natchez
- College: Mississippi

Career history
- Los Angeles Chargers (1960)
- Stats at Pro Football Reference

Charles Conrad Kempinska (October 30, 1938 – December 7, 2019) was an American football player who played one season with the Los Angeles Chargers. He played college football at the University of Mississippi.
