= Allen Brown =

American football player (1943–2020)

No. 83
- Position: Tight end

Personal information
- Born: March 2, 1943; Natchez, Mississippi, U.S.
- Died: January 27, 2020 (aged 76); Natchez, Mississippi, U.S.
- Listed height: 6 ft 5 in (1.96 m)
- Listed weight: 235 lb (107 kg)

Career information
- High school: Natchez
- College: Mississippi (1961-1964)
- NFL draft: 1965: 3rd round, 22nd overall pick
- AFL draft: 1965: 3rd round, 38th overall pick

Career history
- Green Bay Packers (1965–1967)

Awards and highlights
- 2× Super Bowl champion (I, II); 2× NFL Champion (1966, 1967); First-team All-American (1964); Third-team All-American (1963); 2× First-team All-SEC (1963, 1964)

Career NFL statistics
- Receptions: 3
- Receiving yards: 43
- Return yards: 13
- Stats at Pro Football Reference

Allen Brown (March 2, 1943 – January 27, 2020) was an American professional football player who was a tight end in the National Football League (NFL) for the Green Bay Packers. He played college football for the Ole Miss Rebels.

== Early life ==
He attended Natchez High School, where he was a three-sport athlete and almost chose Louisiana State University for college.

Playing for Johnny Vaught at the University of Mississippi, Brown lettered three times (1962–64) and was a co-captain of the 1964 team. He was recognized as All-America by several publications for the 1964 season and was a first-team All-SEC selection his final two years. He was inducted into Ole Miss Athletic Hall of Fame in 1989 and the Mississippi Sports Hall of Fame in 2010. In 2004, Brown was honored by the Southeastern Conference as an SEC football legend. He was honored with "Allen Brown Day" in his hometown.

== Professional career ==
Brown was selected by the Packers in the third round (38th overall) of the 1965 NFL draft. He was also drafted by the San Diego Chargers in the third round (22nd overall) of the 1965 American Football League draft. Brown signed with the Packers in December 1964. He missed the whole 1965 season with a dislocated shoulder. Brown played five games in the 1966 season before injuring his knee. He played in every game in 1967, recording three receptions, before he ruptured a kidney against the Pittsburgh Steelers in the final game. He retired the next spring.

== Personal life ==
Two of Brown's sons, Timothy and Burkes, played at Ole Miss as well. His grandson Ben Brown is a center for the New England Patriots.

Brown died on January 27, 2020.
