= Otha Foster =

American gridiron football player (born 1988)

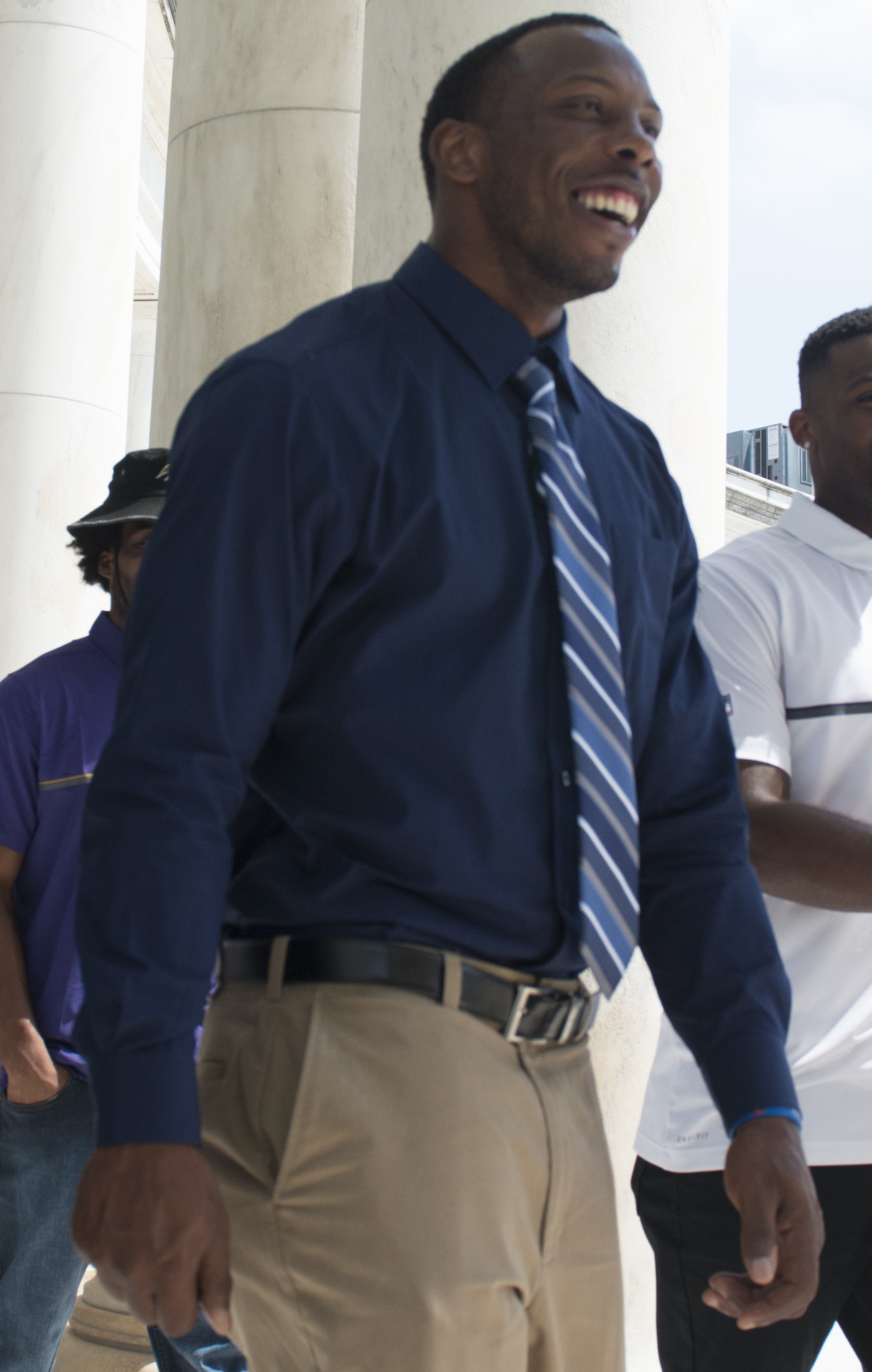
- Foster at Arlington National Cemetery in 2017

No. 31
- Position: Defensive back

Personal information
- Born: September 27, 1988 (age 38); Angie, Louisiana, U.S.
- Listed height: 6 ft 0 in (1.83 m)
- Listed weight: 210 lb (95 kg)

Career information
- High school: Angie (LA) Varnado High School
- College: West Alabama
- NFL draft: 2013: undrafted

Career history
- Kansas City Chiefs (2013)*; Toronto Argonauts (2014)*; Edmonton Eskimos (2014–2015); Saskatchewan Roughriders (2016); Baltimore Ravens (2017)*; Saskatchewan Roughriders (2017); BC Lions (2018); Saskatchewan Roughriders (2020)
- * Offseason or practice squad member only

Awards and highlights
- Grey Cup champion (2015); CFL West All-Star (2018)

Career CFL statistics
- Total tackles: 222
- Sacks: 8
- Interceptions: 3
- Stats at CFL.ca
- Stats at Pro Football Reference

Otha Foster III (born September 27, 1988) is an American former professional football defensive back. He played college football at West Alabama. He was a member of the Kansas City Chiefs and Baltimore Ravens of the National Football League (NFL), and the Toronto Argonauts, Edmonton Eskimos, Saskatchewan Roughriders and BC Lions of the Canadian Football League (CFL).

== High School ==
Foster was a multi-sport athlete and an all-state running back for Varnado High School.

== College career ==
Foster began his college career as a redshirt at Southern before leaving school to join the military.

Foster later played for two years at Pearl River Community College during 2009 and 2010. He then transferred to the University of West Alabama where he completed his college career in 2011 and 2012, where his career record included 96 tackles, 16 pass deflections and 10 interceptions.

== Professional career ==
=== Kansas City Chiefs ===
In May 2013, Foster signed with the Kansas City Chiefs of the NFL, as an undrafted free agent He played three preseason games with the Chiefs before being cut from the team.

=== Toronto Argonauts ===
He then moved to the Canadian Football League (CFL), signing with the Toronto Argonauts from whom he was acquired by the Edmonton Eskimos in 2014. He was traded to Edmonton from Toronto on May 13, 2014, along with Toronto's first and second round picks (6th and 15th overall) in the 2014 CFL Canadian Draft, import offensive lineman Tony Washington and a negotiation list player, in exchange for Edmonton's first and third round picks (3rd and 21st overall) in the 2014 CFL Canadian Draft and a negotiation list player.

=== Edmonton Eskimos ===
After being traded to the Eskimos Foster became an immediate starter, and played in 16 games in the 2014 season. Foster recorded 46 defensive tackles, five special teams tackles, five pass knockdowns, one interception, one sack, one fumble recovery and one forced fumble. In the Labour Day Classic, Foster recovered a blocked punt by Willie Jefferson and scored a 57-yard touchdown. In the West Semi-final against Saskatchewan, Foster recorded one defensive tackle. In the West Final against Calgary, he recorded two defensive tackles. Foster continued his strong play in the 2015 season, contributing 57 tackles, 2 special teams tackles, 2 sacks, 1 interception, 1 forced fumble and 1 defensive touchdown.

=== Saskatchewan Roughriders (first stint) ===
On February 10, 2016, Foster signed as a free agent with the Saskatchewan Roughriders of the CFL. Foster had his best statistical season in 2016 playing in all 18 regular season games and racking up 71 tackles and 3 quarterback sacks. Set to become a free-agent in February 2017, Foster had a workout with the New Orleans Saints In December 2016. On January 20, 2017, Foster had a workout with the Baltimore Ravens. On January 27, 2017, a couple weeks before becoming a free agent, Foster was released by the Riders so he could pursue NFL opportunities.

=== Baltimore Ravens ===
On January 31, 2017, Foster signed a reserve/future contract with the Baltimore Ravens. He was waived on September 1, 2017, during final roster cutdowns.

=== Saskatchewan Roughriders (second stint) ===
He signed with Saskatchewan in September 2017. He played in three games, all starts, for the Roughriders in 2017.

=== BC Lions ===
Foster signed with the BC Lions on February 14, 2018. He started 18 games for the Lions in 2018.

=== Saskatchewan Roughriders (third stint) ===
Foster signed a one-year contract with the Roughriders on February 10, 2020. However, the 2020 CFL season was later cancelled.

== Personal life ==
Foster joined the United States Marine Corps in 2007 after he was redshirted at Southern University, attending basic training at Marine Corps Recruit Depot Parris Island and becoming a communications expert. He served in the Marines while playing football for two years at Pearl River Community College.

He is the father of three children, Olavia K. Foster, born on April 16, 2010. He is also the father of Otha Foster IV, and Oakley Delores. Foster's Mother is Valerie Lee Foster Aikens. Foster's father, Otha Foster Jr., died January 9, 2010, after being a disabled dialysis patient for 19 years. Foster III was the main caregiver for his father since the age of eight. Even though Foster Jr. was on dialysis, he still managed to coach Foster III's little league football team. He lived to see him play JUCO, but he died at the age of 43, during Christmas break, before Foster III started at West Alabama.
