= Cathy Cooper =

American painter

- Born: Catherine McPeak Cooper; November 8, 1960 (age 65); Whittier, California, U.S.
- Education: California State University, Long Beach
- Known for: Artist; stylist (wardrobe and costume); sculptor; painter; model; musician
- Movement: Post-modern; assemblage
- Awards: MVPA 2009 Best Costuming Video Awards

Catherine McPeak Cooper (born November 8, 1960) is a postmodern artist and wardrobe stylist who lives and maintains a studio in Los Angeles. Working as a costume and wardrobe designer for the past 28 years, she has been collaborating with directors, musicians, commercial advertisers and photographers. Cooper completed the costuming and wardrobe for the Los Angeles Philharmonic's (and ballet) productions of Igor Stravinsky's Firebird ballet choreographed version of Ravel's Boléro.

Her wardrobe and costuming work is seen regularly on numerous movies. In advertising, her wardrobe credits include Nike, Coca-Cola, Heineken, Ford, McDonald's, Clorox, Orbitz, Honda, The North Face and many others. Her work was nominated for the MVPA 2009 Best Costuming Video Award for the Modest Mouse hit single "Dashboard" music video. She has produced costuming work for videos with bands and artists such as Alice in Chains, The Cramps, Cut Copy, Sister Mantos, Hayley Kiyoko, Stone Temple Pilots, Unwritten Law, Aerosmith, and Weird Al Yankovic. Her album/CD jacket design work can be seen with record labels such as Centaur Records, Geffen Records, Sony Records, Interscope, and A&M Records. She also works as a professional model for advertising and photo layouts in commercial media.

== Early years ==
She was born Catherine McPeak Cooper in Whittier, California, the second daughter of four children (two girls, two boys); the family grew up in the nearby northeastern section of La Habra (remote, Southeastern base of the Puente Hills). She is the older sister of composer/arranger Jack Cooper and the granddaughter (x4) of Harriet Byron McAllister and the grand-daughter of Mississippi legislator Homer Vernon Cooper. Her mother Georgie was a professional pianist and teacher. Cooper's athletic ability in the 800-meter run enabled her to receive an athletic scholarship to the University of California, Irvine. She transferred to the arts program at California State University, Fullerton and eventually received her Bachelor of Arts from California State University, Long Beach.

== Style, media, influences, and music ==
Cooper has noted the influence of designers such as Edith Head, Coco Chanel, Junya Watanabe, Rei Kawakubo, Henrik Vibskov, Tsumori Chisato, Kenzō Takada, Norma Kamali, Ossie Clark, Alexander McQueen, and Salvatore Ferragamo; a great deal of her work with costuming is categorized as post-modern urban.

"Cathy Cooper's mixed media sculptures describe a natural world that grows out of garbage and decay." Her sculptures are pieced together with fabric, found objects and paper mache; they are constructed in bright color combinations much like the clothing she designs and has been influenced by.

== The Great Sadness ==
Cooper has played and toured with her band The Great Sadness. The duo of Cooper and Stephen McNeely has gained exposure in the hard rock, alternative music scene of Los Angeles. Their album Weep was released April 20, 2017. They recorded with Joe Cardamone, and the album was mastered by Howie Weinberg.
