= W. C. Gorden =

American football player and coach (1930–2020)

Biographical details
- Born: June 30, 1930; Nashville, Tennessee, U.S.
- Died: October 23, 2020 (aged 90)

Playing career

Football
- 1948–1952: Tennessee State

Coaching career (HC unless noted)

Football
- 1966–1976: Jackson State (assistant)
- 1976–1991: Jackson State

Baseball
- 1971–1972: Jackson State

Head coaching record
- Overall: 119–48–5 (football)
- Tournaments: Football; 0–9 (NCAA D-I-AA playoffs)

Accomplishments and honors

Championships
- Football; 8 SWAC (1980–1982, 1985–1988, 1990)
- College Football Hall of Fame; Inducted in 2008 (profile)

William C. Gorden (June 30, 1930 – October 23, 2020) was an American college football player and coach. He served as the head coach at Jackson State University from 1976 to 1991, compiling a record of 119–48–5. Gorden joined the Jackson State football staff as an assistant coach in 1966. He was named interim head coach during the 1976 season after the firing of Robert Hill. His appointment as head coach was made permanent following the 1976 season. Gorden was inducted into the College Football Hall of Fame as a coach in 2008. He was an alumnus of Tennessee State University.

Gorden died October 23, 2020, at the age of 90.

== Head coaching record ==
=== Football ===
Year	Team	Overall	Conference	Standing	Bowl/playoffs	AP/NCAA^{#}
Jackson State Tigers (Southwestern Athletic Conference) (1976–1991)
1976	Jackson State	1–1 (Note: Robert Hill coached the first seven games of the 1976 season before he was fired. Gorden took over as interim head coach for the final two games. Jackson State finished 5–4 overall and 3–3 in Southwestern Athletic Conference play.)	1–1	T–4th		
1977	Jackson State	8–3	5–1	2nd		
1978	Jackson State	10–2	5–1	2nd	L NCAA Division I-AA Semifinal	2
1979	Jackson State	8–3	4–2	T–3rd		8
1980	Jackson State	8–3	5–1	T–1st		8
1981	Jackson State	9–2–1	5–1	1st	L NCAA Division I-AA Quarterfinal	4
1982	Jackson State	9–3	6–0	1st	L NCAA Division I-AA First Round	8
1983	Jackson State	8–3	5–2	T–2nd		15
1984	Jackson State	4–5–1	3–4	5th		
1985	Jackson State	8–3	6–1	T–1st	L NCAA Division I-AA First Round	15
1986	Jackson State	9–3	7–0	1st	L NCAA Division I-AA First Round	9
1987	Jackson State	8–3–1	7–0	1st	L NCAA Division I-AA First Round	9
1988	Jackson State	8–1–2	7–0	1st	L NCAA Division I-AA First Round	5
1989	Jackson State	8–4	5–2	T–2nd	L NCAA Division I-AA First Round	17
1990	Jackson State	8–4	5–1	1st	L NCAA Division I-AA First Round	16
1991	Jackson State	5–5	3–4	6th		
Jackson State:		119–48–5	79–21			
Total:		119–48–5				
National championship Conference title Conference division title or championship game berth
