= Varnado High School =

School in Louisiana, United States

Coordinates: 30°53′33″N 89°50′1″W

Varnado High School is a public school in Angie, Louisiana, near Varnado, Louisiana. Part of the Washington Parish School Board district, it is categorized as distant rural. In 2025, almost 2/3 of its students were black, about a third white, and less than 2 percent Hispanic or more than one "race". Most of its students are categorized as economically disadvantaged and test scores are below state averages.

School colors are royal blue and white.

In 2021, its game against district rival Bogalusa High School was cancelled due to fears over violence.

== History ==
A Rosenwald school and later, after it burned, Wesley Ray School served black students. Eagles were its mascot. After Varnado High School was integrated, Wesley Ray High became Wesley Ray Elementary School.

== Alumni ==
- Delrick Abrams, football player
- Andre Jones Jr., professional football player
- Joe Carter, football player
- Steve Martin, football player
- Kim Lewis, basketball coach and former player inducted into Tulane University's Hall of Fame and was Washington Parish's all-time leading scorer. Played professionally in U.S. and Iceland. Coached for Richmond Spiders
- Drew Meyerchick, basketball player
- J. Larry Crain, former president of Southeastern Louisiana University and Louisiana Commissioner of Higher Education
- Otha Foster III, football player
