= USS Cairo =

American Civil War ironclad warship

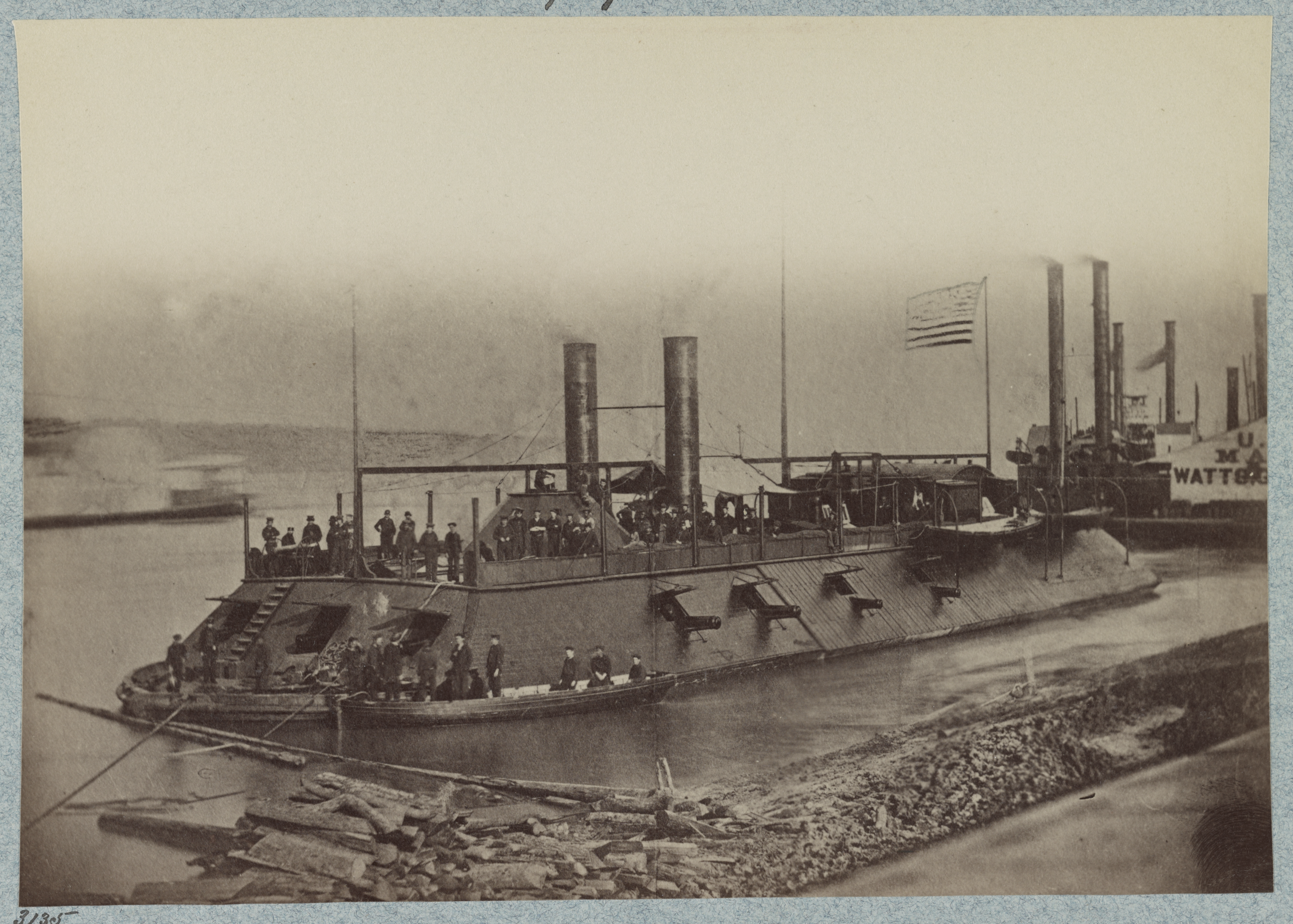
- USS Cairo at anchor

History

United States
- Name: Cairo
- Namesake: City of Cairo, Illinois
- Operator: US Army
- Ordered: August(?) 1861
- Builder: James Eads and Company, Mound City, Illinois
- Laid down: 1861
- Launched: 1861
- Commissioned: 25 January 1862
- Fate: Transferred to the US Navy

United States
- Name: Cairo
- Commissioned: 1 October 1862
- Fate: Sunk by mine, 12 December 1862
- Status: Raised, 1964, museum ship

General characteristics
- Class & type: City-class ironclad
- Tonnage: 512
- Length: 175 ft (53.3 m)
- Beam: 51 ft 2 in (15.6 m)
- Draft: 6 ft (1.8 m)
- Installed power: 5 fire-tube boilers
- Propulsion: 1 Steam engine; Paddle wheel
- Speed: 4 knots (7.4 km/h; 4.6 mph)
- Complement: 251 officers and enlisted men
- Armament: (see section below)
- Armor: Forward casemate: 2.5 inches (64 mm); Pilot house: 2.5 inches (64 mm); 60 feet (18 m) of the side covering the machinery: 2.5 inches (64 mm).; Forward part of casemate sides: 3.5 inches (89 mm) railroad iron
- USS Cairo
- U.S. National Register of Historic Places
- Location within Mississippi Location within the United States
- Coordinates: 32°22′33″N 90°52′0″W
- Built: 1861
- NRHP reference No.: 71000068
- Added to NRHP: 3 September 1971

USS Cairo /ˈkeɪroʊ/ is the lead ship of the City-class casemate ironclads built at the beginning of the American Civil War to serve as river gunboats.

Cairo is named for Cairo, Illinois. In June 1862, she captured the Confederate garrison of Fort Pillow on the Mississippi River, enabling Union forces to occupy Memphis. As part of the Yazoo Pass Expedition, she was sunk on 12 December 1862, while clearing mines for the attack on Haines Bluff. Cairo was the first ship ever to be sunk by a mine remotely detonated by hand.

The remains of Cairo can be viewed at Vicksburg National Military Park with a museum of its weapons and naval stores.

== Service in the American Civil War ==
Cairo was built by James Eads and Co., Mound City, Illinois, in 1861, under contract to the United States Department of War. She was commissioned as part of the Union Army's Western Gunboat Flotilla, which had US Navy Lieutenant James M. Prichett in command.

Cairo served with the Army's Western Gunboat Flotilla on the Mississippi and Ohio Rivers, and their tributaries until she was transferred to the Navy on 1 October 1862, with the other river gunboats. She was commanded by Flag Officer Andrew Hull Foote.

Active in the occupation of Clarksville, Tennessee, 17 February 1862, and of Nashville, Tennessee, 25 February, Cairo stood down the river on 12 April, escorting mortar boats to begin the lengthy operations against Fort Pillow. An engagement with Confederate gunboats at Plum Point Bend on 11 May, marked a series of blockading and bombardment activities which culminated into the abandonment of the fort by its defenders on 4 June.

On 6 June 1862, two days later, Cairo joined in the triumph of seven Union ships and a tug over eight Confederate gunboats off Memphis. Five of the opposing gunboats were sunk or run ashore during this action; two were seriously damaged, and one managed to escape. That night, Union forces occupied the city. Cairo returned to patrol on the Mississippi until 21 November, when she joined the Yazoo Pass Expedition.

On 12 December 1862, while clearing mines from the river, preparatory to the attack on Haines Bluff, Cairo struck a "torpedo" (or naval mine) detonated by volunteers hidden behind the river bank and sank in 12 minutes. There were no casualties.

== Armament ==
Like many of the Mississippi theatre ironclads, Cairo had her armament changed over the life of the vessel. To speed up her entrance into the service, Cairo and the other City-class ships were fitted with whatever weapons were on hand, then had their weapons upgraded as new pieces were made available. Though the 8 in (203 mm) smoothbore Dahlgren guns were fairly modern, most of the other original weapons were antiquated, such as the 32-pounders, or modified, such as the 42-pounder "rifles". These were old smoothbores that had been made into rifles. The 42-pounder weapons were of particular concern to military commanders because they were structurally weaker and more prone to exploding than purpose-built rifled cannons. Additionally, the close confines of combat on the rivers greatly increased the threat of boarding parties. The 12-pounder howitzer was equipped to address that concern and was not used in regular combat.

Ordnance characteristics
January 1862	November 1862
• 3 × 8-inch smoothbores • 6 × 42-pounder rifle • 6 × 32-pounder rifles • 1 × 12-pounder rifle	• 3 × 8-inch smoothbores • 3 × 42-pounder rifles • 6 × 32-pounder rifle • 1 × 30-pounder rifle • 1 × 12-pounder rifle

== Discovery of the wreck ==
Over the years, the gunboat was forgotten and slowly covered by silt and sand. Impacted in mud, Cairo became a time capsule in which her unique, historical artifacts were preserved against corrosion and biological degradation. Her whereabouts became a matter of speculation, as members of the crew had died and local residents were unsure of the location.

Studying Civil War maps, Edwin C. Bearss of Vicksburg National Military Park set out to search for the lost ship using a simple magnetic compass. With the assistance of Don Jacks and Warren Grabau, the ship was found in 1956. In 1960, numerous artifacts were recovered from the ship, including the pilothouse and an 8-inch cannon, both preserved by the Yazoo River mud.

With support from the State of Mississippi, State Senator H.V. Cooper and local authorities, the gunboat was salvaged from the bottom of the river.

== Salvage and museum ==
Hopes of lifting the ironclad and her cargo of artifacts intact were crushed in October 1964, when the 3-inch cables being used to lift Cairo cut deeply into its wooden hull. It then became a question of saving as much of the vessel as possible. A decision was made to cut Cairo into three sections. By the end of December, the battered remains were put on barges and towed to Vicksburg, Mississippi. In the summer of 1965, the barges carrying Cairo were towed to Ingalls Shipyard on the Gulf Coast in Pascagoula, Mississippi. There the armor was removed, cleaned, and stored. The two engines were taken apart, cleaned and reassembled. Sections of the hull were braced internally and a sprinkler system was operated continually to keep the white oak structural timbers from warping and checking. On 3 September 1971, Cairo was listed on the National Register of Historic Places.

In 1972, the U.S. Congress enacted legislation authorizing the National Park Service to accept the title to Cairo and restore the gunboat for display in Vicksburg National Military Park. Delays in funding the project halted progress until June 1977, when the vessel was transported to the park and partially reconstructed on a concrete foundation near the Vicksburg National Cemetery. A shelter to cover the vessel was completed in October 1980, with the museum opening in November. The original space-frame shelter has since been replaced by a tension-fabric system to provide better cover.

The recovery of artifacts from Cairo revealed a treasure trove of weapons, ammunition, naval stores, and personal gear of the sailors who served on board. A key element of the National Battlefield circular tour route is the USS Cairo Museum, which includes both the sheltered gunboat hulk and a separate display, fully enclosed within a roofed structure, of vitrined gunboat artifacts. These include a sailor's rope knife in good condition.

Since salvage, although in an outdoor sheltered space the Cairo has suffered degradation due to exposure to the elements, bird droppings, and vandalism. There are only three other surviving Civil War-era ironclads in existence in addition to the Cairo: USS Monitor, CSS Neuse, and CSS Muscogee.

== Gallery ==
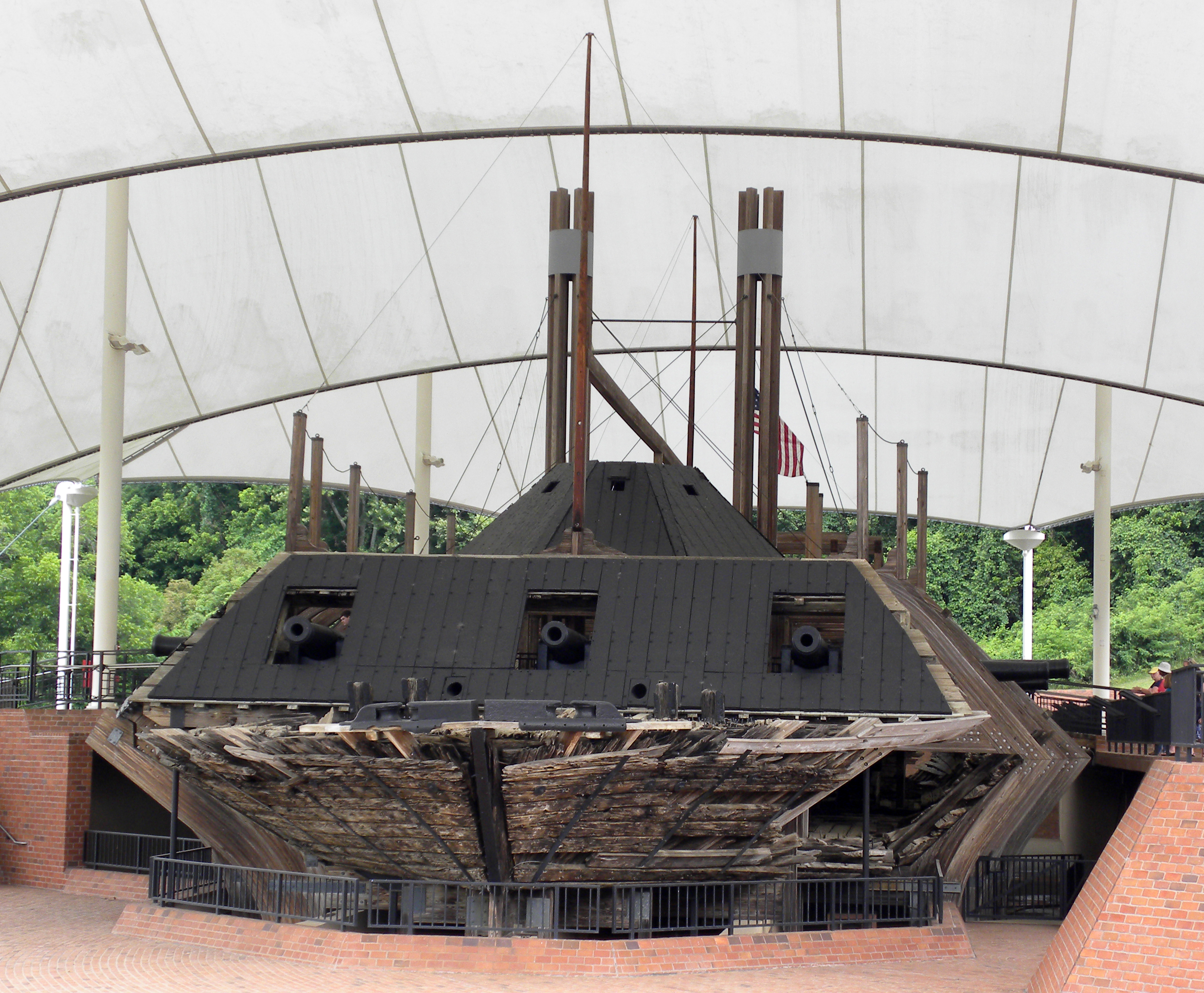
USS Cairo in her final resting place at Vicksburg National Military Park. A wooden framework has been built to support what remains of the ship.

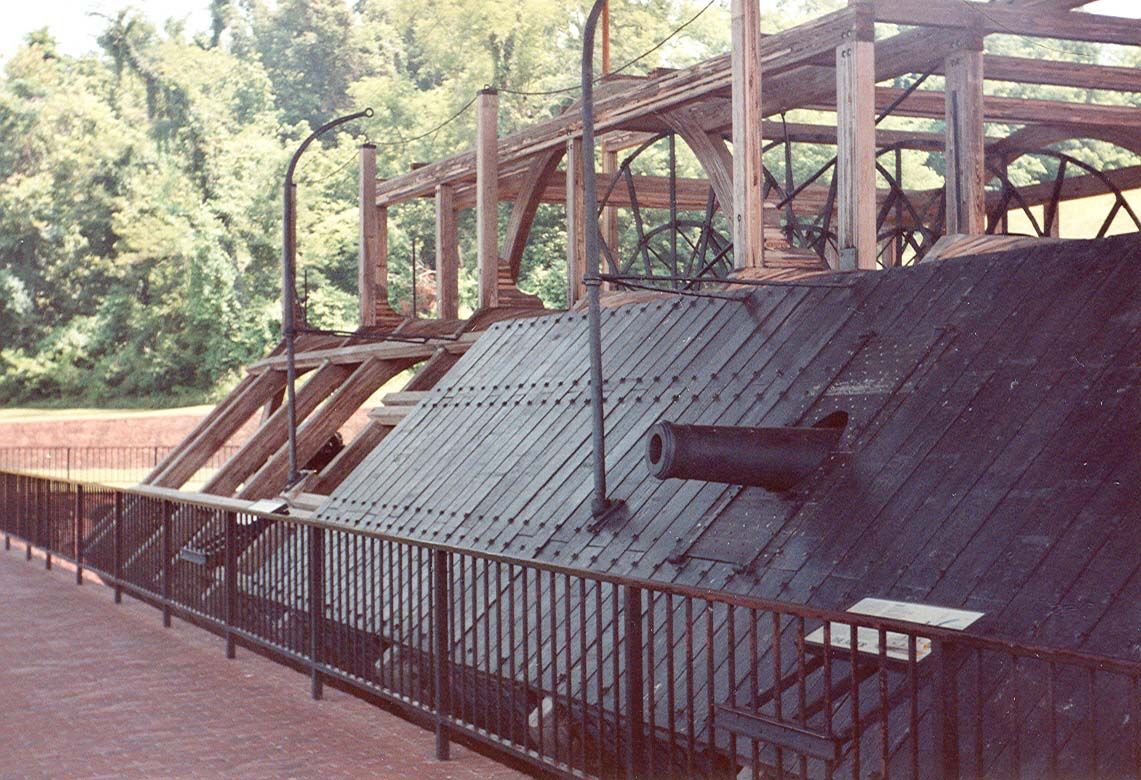
One of the cannons on the side of the Cairo. The framework for the paddlewheels is in the background.

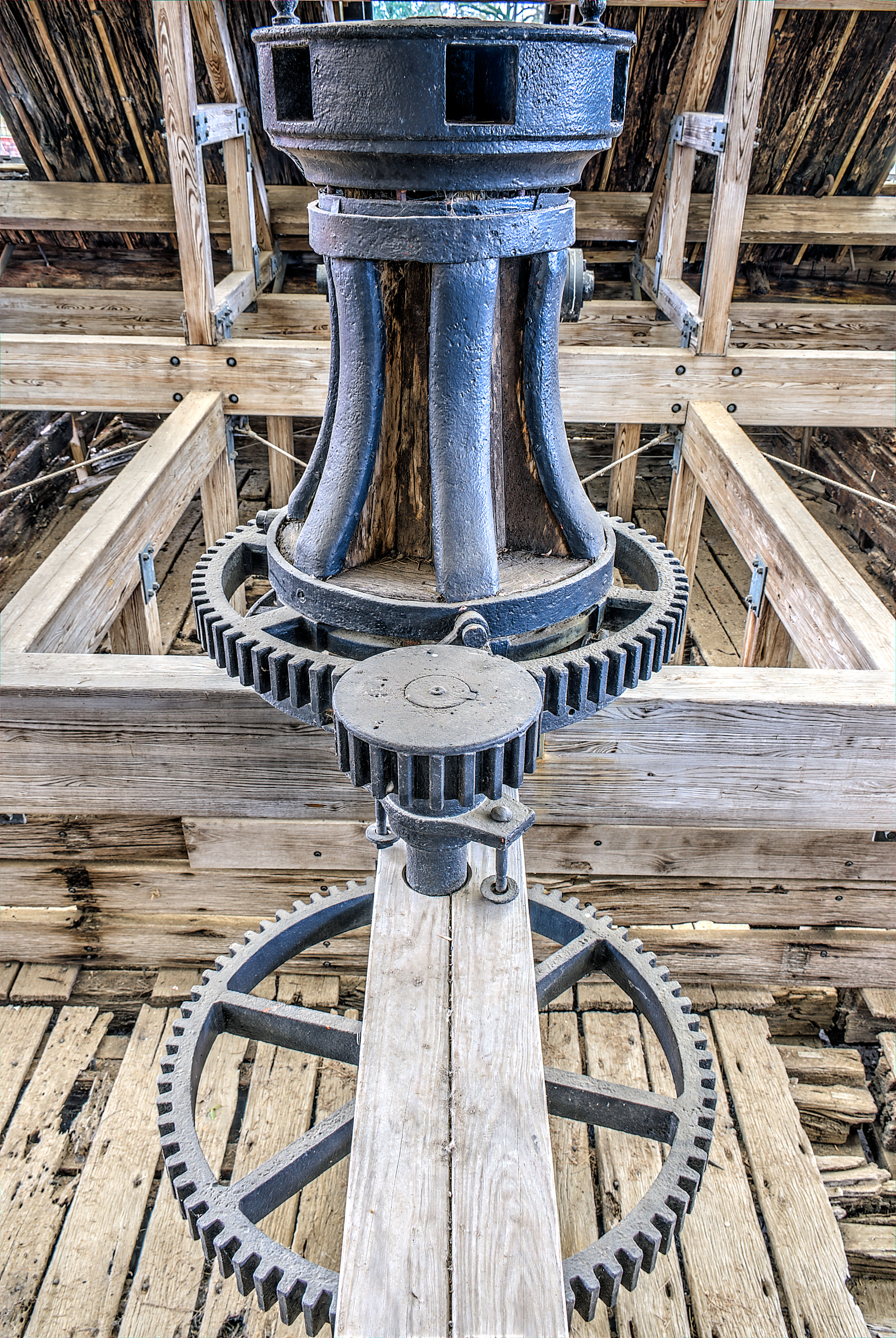
Capstan of the Cairo, used to lift the anchor and to pull hawsers taut.

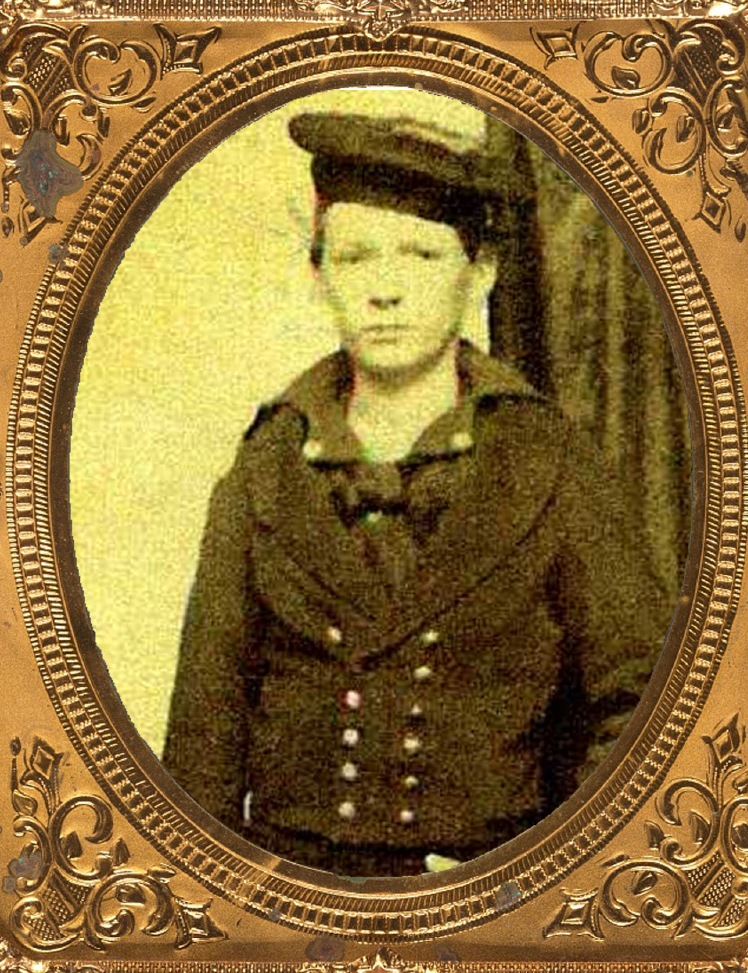
George R. Yost, aged 14, served as 1st Class Boy aboard the Cairo.

== See also ==
- Anaconda Plan
- Mississippi Squadron
- Union Navy
- List of United States Navy ships
