= Keith Wright (wide receiver) =

American football player (born 1956)

No. 89
- Positions: Wide receiver, return specialist

Personal information
- Born: January 30, 1956 (age 70); Mercedes, Texas, U.S.
- Listed height: 5 ft 10 in (1.78 m)
- Listed weight: 172 lb (78 kg)

Career information
- High school: Warren Central (Vicksburg, Mississippi)
- College: Memphis
- NFL draft: 1978: 5th round, 122nd overall pick

Career history
- Cleveland Browns (1978–1980)

Career NFL statistics
- Kick return yards: 1,767
- Punt return yards: 467
- Receiving yards: 151
- Stats at Pro Football Reference

William Keith Wright (born January 30, 1956) is an American former professional football player who was a wide receiver and return specialist in the National Football League (NFL). He played college football for the Memphis Tigers and was selected 122nd overall by the Cleveland Browns in the fifth round of the 1978 NFL draft.
