= Robert Hill (coach) =

American football and baseball coach (died 2016)

Biographical details
- Born: c. 1934
- Died: May 17, 2016 (aged 81)

Playing career

Football
- ?–1955: Jackson State
- 1956: Baltimore Colts
- 1956: Pittsburgh Steelers
- Position: Fullback

Coaching career (HC unless noted)

Football
- 1959–1960: Magee HS (MS)
- 1961–1962: Rowan HS (MS)
- 1963–1970: Jackson State (assistant)
- 1971–1976: Jackson State

Baseball
- c. 1970: Jackson State

Head coaching record
- Overall: 44–15–1 (college football)

Accomplishments and honors

Championships
- Football; 3 SWAC (1972–1973, 1975)

Awards
- SWAC Coach of the Year (1971)

Robert "Big Bob" Hill (c. 1934 – May 17, 2016) was an American football and baseball coach. He served as the head football coach at Jackson State University from 1971 to 1976, compiling a record of 44–15–1. Hill's winning percentage of .742 is the second highest of any head coach in the history of the Jackson State Tigers football program. During his tenure at Jackson State, he mentored future Pro Football Hall of Famers Walter Payton and Jackie Slater. Hill was fired from his post during the 1976 season and replaced by his assistant, W. C. Gorden.

Hill played college football at Jackson State and was selected in the 20th round of the 1956 NFL draft by the Baltimore Colts. He was the first Jackson State player to sign a National Football League (NFL) contract. Hill was released by the Colts and signed by the Pittsburgh Steelers in August 1956. After coaching at Magee High School and Rowan High School in Mississippi, Hill joined the Jackson State football staff in 1963 and worked as an assistant under Edward Clemons, Rod Paige, and Ulysses S. McPherson. Hill also coached baseball at Jackson State.

Hill died on May 17, 2016.

== Head coaching record ==
=== College football ===
Year	Team	Overall	Conference	Standing	Bowl/playoffs
Jackson State Tigers (Southwestern Athletic Conference) (1971–1976)
1971	Jackson State	9–1–1	4–1–1	2nd	
1972	Jackson State	8–3	5–1	T–1st	
1973	Jackson State	9–2	5–1	T–1st	
1974	Jackson State	7–3	4–2	2nd	
1975	Jackson State	7–3	4–2	T–1st	
1976	Jackson State	4–3 (Note: Hill coached the first seven games of the 1976 season before he was fired. W. C. Gorden served as interim head coach for the final two games. Jackson State finished 5–4 overall and 3–3 in conference play, tying for fourth place in the SWAC.)	2–2		
Jackson State:		44–15–1	24–9–1		
Total:		44–15–1			
National championship Conference title Conference division title or championship game berth
