= Oakley Dalton =

American football player (born 1952)

No. 66
- Position: Defensive tackle

Personal information
- Born: July 18, 1952 (age 74); Welch, West Virginia, U.S.
- Listed height: 6 ft 6 in (1.98 m)
- Listed weight: 285 lb (129 kg)

Career information
- High school: Gary (WV)
- College: Jackson State (1973–1976)
- NFL draft: 1977: 12th round, 315th overall pick

Career history
- New Orleans Saints (1977)

Career NFL statistics
- Games played: 1
- Stats at Pro Football Reference

Oakley J. Dalton (born July 18, 1952) is an American former professional football player who was a defensive tackle for the New Orleans Saints of the National Football League (NFL). He played college football for the Jackson State Tigers.
