= Rico Richardson =

American football player (born 1991)

No. 81, 83
- Position: Wide receiver

Personal information
- Born: July 1, 1991 (age 35); Natchez, Mississippi, U.S.
- Listed height: 6 ft 1 in (1.85 m)
- Listed weight: 188 lb (85 kg)

Career information
- High school: Natchez
- College: Jackson State
- NFL draft: 2013: undrafted

Career history
- Kansas City Chiefs (2013)*; Houston Texans (2013–2014)*; Tennessee Titans (2014–2015); Arizona Cardinals (2016)*; San Diego Chargers (2016)*
- * Offseason or practice squad member only
- Stats at Pro Football Reference

Rico Richardson (born July 1, 1991) is an American former professional football wide receiver. He played college football at Jackson State University. He was a member of the Kansas City Chiefs, Houston Texans, Tennessee Titans, Arizona Cardinals, and San Diego Chargers of the National Football League (NFL).

== Early life ==
Richardson was born in Natchez, Mississippi and played high school football at Natchez High School. He was a 1st team All-Region, 1st team All-Metro and 2nd team All-State. He set a Natchez High School receiving record with 3,500 yards. Richardson recorded 46 receptions for 891 yards and seven touchdowns his senior year. He also rushed for 442 yards and six touchdowns on 42 carries. He was the a Class 5A state champion in the triple jump (46 feet, 11 inches) in track and field. Richardson also played basketball in high school.

== College career ==
Richardson played for the Jackson State Tigers from 2009 to 2012. He played in 43 games, starting 20, for the Tigers. He recorded 146 receptions for 2,722 yards (18.6 avg.) and 26 touchdowns.

== Professional career ==
Richardson signed with the Kansas City Chiefs on May 1, 2013, after going undrafted in the 2013 NFL draft. He was released by the Chiefs on August 31, 2013.

Richardson was signed to the Houston Texans' practice squad on November 13, 2013. He was signed to a future contract on December 30, 2013. He was released by the Texans on May 14, 2014.

Richardson signed with the Tennessee Titans on June 13, 2014. He was released by the Titans on August 30 and signed to the team's practice squad on August 31, 2014. He was promoted to the active roster on December 18, 2014. On December 18, 2014, Richardson made his NFL debut against the Jacksonville Jaguars. Richardson was released by the Titans on September 5, 2015, and signed to the team's practice squad on September 6, 2015. He was promoted to the active roster on October 24, 2015, as the Titans released Chase Coffman. On November 28, 2015, he was waived by the Titans. Richardson was re-signed to the practice squad on December 22, 2015.

He was signed by the Arizona Cardinals on June 6, 2016. On July 30, 2016, he was released by the Cardinals.

Richardson was signed by the San Diego Chargers on August 8, 2016. He was then waived/injured on August 18, 2016.

== Personal life ==
Richardson has two daughters, Harmonee and Melody.
