= Sylvester Stamps =

American football player (born 1961)

No. 84, 29, 24
- Position: RB/WR/ RS

Personal information
- Born: February 24, 1961 (age 65); Vicksburg, Mississippi, U.S.

Career information
- High school: Vicksburg
- College: Jackson State
- NFL draft: 1984: undrafted

Career history
- Atlanta Falcons (1984–1988); Tampa Bay Buccaneers (1989)

Awards and highlights
- First-team All-Pro (1987); Jackson State Sports Hall of Fame

Career NFL statistics
- Rushing attempts-yards: 66-382
- Receptions-yards: 48-413
- Touchdowns: 3
- Stats at Pro Football Reference

Sylvester Stamps (born February 24, 1961, in Vicksburg, Mississippi) is an American former professional football player who was a running back/wide receiver in the National Football League (NFL). He played six seasons for the Atlanta Falcons (1984–1988) and the Tampa Bay Buccaneers (1989). He played college football for the Jackson State Tigers.

He played for Vicksburg High School. He became its all-time leading rusher with 2,946 yards, had 30 rushing touchdowns during his high school career, and was inducted into its hall of fame. He played for coach Houston Markham Jr. at Jackson State. He helped the Gators win two SWAC championships. In college and the pros he also returned kickoffs. He led the NFL in return yards in 1987.

A. J. Stamps is his nephew.
