= Paul McJulien =

American football player (born 1965)

No. 16, 10
- Position: Punter

Personal information
- Born: February 24, 1965 (age 61); Chicago, Illinois, U.S.
- Listed height: 5 ft 10 in (1.78 m)
- Listed weight: 190 lb (86 kg)

Career information
- High school: Baker (Baker, Louisiana)
- College: Jackson State
- NFL draft: 1988: undrafted

Career history
- San Diego Chargers (1988)*; Seattle Seahawks (1990)*; Miami Dolphins (1991)*; San Francisco 49ers (1991)*; Green Bay Packers (1991–1992); Kansas City Chiefs (1992); Sacramento Gold Miners (1993); Los Angeles Rams (1993)
- * Offseason or practice squad member only

Career NFL statistics
- Punts: 143
- Punting yards: 5654
- Punting avg: 39.5
- Stats at Pro Football Reference

Paul Dorien McJulien (born February 25, 1965) is an American former professional football player who was a punter in the National Football League (NFL). He played college football for the Jackson State Tigers. He played two seasons for the Green Bay Packers from 1991 to 1992 and one for the Los Angeles Rams in 1993.
