= Vicksburg-Warren School District =

School district in Mississippi

Coordinates: 32.342725°N 90.863290°W

The Vicksburg-Warren School District (VWSD) is a public school district based in Vicksburg, Mississippi United States. The district's boundaries parallel that of Warren County.

In 1987 the Vicksburg city school district and the Warren County school district combined into a single district.

== Schools ==
=== High schools ===
- Vicksburg High School
- Warren Central High School
- River City Early College

=== Junior high schools ===
- Vicksburg Junior High School
- Warren Central Junior High School
- Academy of Innovation

=== Elementary schools ===
- Beechwood Elementary School
- Bovina Elementary School
- Bowmar Avenue Magnet School
- Dana Road Elementary School
- Redwood Elementary School
- Sherman Avenue Elementary School
- South Park Elementary School
- Warrenton Elementary School
- Vicksburg Intermediate School
- Warren Central Intermediate School

=== Former schools ===
- Hall's Ferry Road Elementary School
  - 1985-1986 National Blue Ribbon School
- Culkin Elementary School
- Jett Elementary School
- Cedars Elementary School
- Vicksburg Middle School
- H. V. Cooper High School
- Rosa A. Temple High School
- Carr Central High School
- Carr Central Junior High School

== Demographics ==
=== 2006-07 school year ===
There were a total of 9,048 students enrolled in the Vicksburg-Warren School District during the 2006–2007 school year. The gender makeup of the district was 50% female and 50% male. The racial makeup of the district was 60.97% African American, 36.83% White, 1.37% Hispanic, 0.74% Asian, and 0.09% Native American. 59.9% of the district's students were eligible to receive free lunch.

=== Previous school years ===
School Year	Enrollment	Gender Makeup		Racial Makeup				
School Year	Enrollment	Female	Male	Asian	African American	Hispanic	Native American	White
2005-06	9,204	50%	50%	0.81%	61.20%	1.12%	0.04%	36.82%
2004-05	8,898	50%	50%	0.82%	60.61%	1.02%	0.06%	37.49%
2003-04	8,940	50%	50%	0.67%	60.08%	1.03%	0.09%	38.13%
2002-03	8,894	50%	50%	0.60%	59.77%	0.83%	0.09%	38.71%

== Accountability statistics ==
	2006-07	2005-06	2004-05	2003-04	2002-03
District Accreditation Status	Accredited	Accredited	Accredited	Accredited	Accredited
School Performance Classifications
Level 5 (Superior Performing) Schools	1	1	1	1	0
Level 4 (Exemplary) Schools	5	3	1	0	3
Level 3 (Successful) Schools	7	9	11	12	10
Level 2 (Under Performing) Schools	0	0	0	0	0
Level 1 (Low Performing) Schools	0	0	0	0	0
Not Assigned	0	0	0	0	0

== See also ==
- List of school districts in Mississippi
