= Tom Richardson (American football) =

American football player (born 1944)

No. 49
- Position: Wide receiver

Personal information
- Born: October 15, 1944 (age 82); Greenville, Mississippi, U.S.

Career information
- High school: Coleman
- College: Jackson State
- NFL draft: 1966: undrafted

Career history
- Dallas Cowboys (1966)*; Boston Patriots (1969–1970)
- * Offseason or practice squad member only

Career NFL statistics
- Receiving yards: 5
- Receptions: 1
- Receiving TDs: 0
- Rushing yards: 0
- Rush attempts: 0
- Games played: 15
- Stats at Pro Football Reference

Tom Richardson (born October 15, 1944) is a former NFL football player with the Boston Patriots during the 1970s, as a wide receiver.
