= Warren Central High School (Mississippi) =

Public school in Mississippi, United States

Coordinates: 32°19′46″N 90°49′3″W

Location
- 1000 Highway 27 South; Vicksburg, Mississippi; United States

Information
- Type: Public secondary
- Motto: Home of Champions
- Established: 1965
- School district: Vicksburg Warren School District
- Principal: Drew Rainer
- Faculty: 100
- Teaching staff: 73.56 (FTE)
- Grades: 9–12
- Enrollment: 1,168 (2023-2024)
- Student to teacher ratio: 15.88
- Colors: Royal blue and red
- Mascot: Magnus the Viking
- Nickname: Vikings
- Rival: Vicksburg High School
- Newspaper: NorseStar
- Yearbook: Valhalla
- Website: www.vwsd.org/o/wchs

Warren Central High School is a public high school in unincorporated Warren County, Mississippi, United States (with a Vicksburg postal address). It is part of the Vicksburg-Warren School District. During the 2015–16 school year, it had 1,240 students enrolled at its main campus (buildings A and B).

== History ==
In 1965, the three existing Warren County high schools, Culkin, Redwood, and Jett, were consolidated to form a unified secondary facility on Highway 27 South that was named Warren Central Senior High School. About 800 students and 40 certified faculty members welcomed at one of the first ultra-modern school facilities in Mississippi, all-electric with central heat and air.

In 1967, Warren Central Junior High School was built on the campus adjacent to the high school building. To meet the need of an expanding student population, a new junior high school facility was constructed in 1973 on the land across the highway from the high school. The original junior high school building was converted into Building B of the high school.

By 1982, Warren Central's enrollment peaked with more than 2,000 students and a curriculum of approximately 170 courses. A nature trail and outdoor classroom area was constructed adjacent to the campus in 1990 with help from the International Paper Company. In 2006, a new fine arts building was constructed to house the Big Blue Band and choral programs. As of 2019–20 the school reported 1,331 students enrolled.

== Extra-curricular activities ==
The school hosts a variety of extra-curricular activities such as Mock Trial, National Honor Society, FIRST Robotics, Quiz Bowl, Future Teachers of America, Red Cross, First Priority, Beta Club, Mu Alpha Theta, 4-H, FBLA, NorseStar (student newspaper), Valhalla (yearbook), GIVE (Gentlemen of Integrity, Valor and Excellence), and others.

== Athletics ==
WCHS' athletic teams are known as the Vikings (men's) and Lady Vikes (women's). It competes in MHSAA (Mississippi High School Athletic Association) Class 6A, Mississippi's largest classification. WCHS's football program, one of the most historically successful programs in the state, has 3 state championships (1988 ,1994 and 2025). It made the playoffs for 21 consecutive years between 1985-2005 and has 33 playoff appearances since 1981. The Lady Vikes basketball program has won 3 state championships, in 1986, 1987, and 1989. Warren Central's baseball program also has one state championship, in 2001, finishing 4th in the USA Today national poll. The Lady Vikes women's golf team won the MHSAA Class III state championship in 2014. Warren Central's Boys Soccer team would play in four of the first five soccer State Championship games. (1989, 90, 92 and 93.)They also appeared in the first five final fours for boys soccer. (1989–93)

Warren Central also offers soccer, track, slow and fast pitch softball, cheer and dance, swimming, men's golf, cross country, volleyball, men's and women's powerlifting, and bowling.

WCHS, along with its sister school, Vicksburg High School, annually hosts the Red Carpet Bowl Classic, Mississippi's longest-running football bowl game. The annual season opening double header alternates between the schools. The two schools also alternate as host of the Red Carpet Basketball Classic each February.

== Notable alumni ==
- Kevin Ford, member of the Mississippi House of Representatives
- Jay Hopson, (1988), head football coach at the University of Southern Mississippi
- Dan Jones, (1970), 16th Chancellor of the University of Mississippi
- Tony Smith, (1989) NFL running back
- Taylor Tankersley, (2001), pitcher for the Miami Marlins
- James Williams, (1997), NFL wide receiver
- Keith Wright, (1974) wide receiver for the Cleveland Browns
- Jaelyn Young, convicted of conspiring to provide material support to a terrorist organization
