= Kevin Dent =

American football player (born 1967)

No. 49
- Position: Safety

Personal information
- Born: May 31, 1967 (age 59); Vicksburg, Mississippi, U.S.

Career information
- College: Jackson State (1985–1988)
- College Football Hall of Fame (Class of 2006)

Kevin Dent (born May 31, 1967) is an American former football safety. He played for Jackson State from 1985 to 1988. During his four years at the school, Jackson State won 27 of 28 conference games, and Dent became the only Jackson State player to be named an All-American three times.

After his college career, the Arizona Cardinals signed Dent as a free agent but released him before the season. He played for the Birmingham Fire of the World Football League and the Tampa Bay Storm of the Arena Football League before a career-ending neck injury.

Dent was a native of Vicksburg, Mississippi and attended Vicksburg High School. He was elected to the College Football Hall of Fame in 2006.
