= Jim Marshall (defensive back) =

American football player (born 1952)

No. 23
- Position: Defensive back

Personal information
- Born: September 8, 1952 (age 74); Magnolia, Mississippi, U.S.
- Listed height: 6 ft 0 in (1.83 m)
- Listed weight: 187 lb (85 kg)

Career information
- High school: Eva Gordon (Magnolia, Mississippi)
- College: Jackson State (1970–1973)

Career history
- 1975–1976: Saskatchewan Roughriders
- 1977–1979: Toronto Argonauts
- 1979: Saskatchewan Roughriders
- 1979, 1981: Montreal Alouettes
- 1980: New Orleans Saints
- 1982: Montreal Concordes

Awards and highlights
- CFL West All-Star (1975)

James Carl Marshall (born September 8, 1952) is a professional American and Canadian football player who played professionally for the Saskatchewan Roughriders, Toronto Argonauts, Montreal Alouettes and New Orleans Saints.
