= D. J. Johnson (cornerback, born 1985) =

American football player (born 1985)

Domonique Johnson
No. 29, 30
- Position: Cornerback

Personal information
- Born: November 7, 1985 (age 40); Texas City, Texas, U.S.
- Listed height: 6 ft 1 in (1.85 m)
- Listed weight: 192 lb (87 kg)

Career information
- High school: La Marque (TX)
- College: Jackson State
- NFL draft: 2009: undrafted

Career history
- Denver Broncos (2009)*; New York Giants (2009−2010); Tampa Bay Buccaneers (2010); Minnesota Vikings (2011)*; Washington Redskins (2011); Philadelphia Eagles (2011−2012)*; Indianapolis Colts (2012)*; Washington Redskins (2012); Detroit Lions (2013)*; Edmonton Eskimos (2014)*
- * Offseason or practice squad member only

Awards and highlights
- SWAC Championship Defensive MVP (2007); First-team All-SWAC (2008)

Career NFL statistics
- Total tackles: 14
- Stats at Pro Football Reference

Domonique Johnson (born November 7, 1985) is an American former professional football player who was a cornerback in the National Football League (NFL). He was signed by the Denver Broncos as an undrafted free agent in 2009. He played college football for the Jackson State Tigers. Prior to transferring to Jackson State University, he played at the University of Missouri.

He was also a member of the New York Giants, Tampa Bay Buccaneers, Minnesota Vikings, Washington Redskins, Indianapolis Colts, Philadelphia Eagles, Detroit Lions, and Edmonton Eskimos.

== Professional career ==
=== 2009 NFL Combine ===
Pre-draft measurables
| Height | Weight | 40-yard dash | 10-yard split | 20-yard split | 20-yard shuttle | Three-cone drill | Vertical jump | Broad jump | Bench press |
|---|---|---|---|---|---|---|---|---|---|
| 6 ft 1 in (1.85 m) | 197 lb (89 kg) | 4.58 s | 1.50 s | 2.59 s | 4.37 s | 7.02 s | 32.0 in (0.81 m) | 9 ft 8 in (2.95 m) | 7 reps |
All values from NFL Combine

=== Denver Broncos ===
Johnson signed with the Denver Broncos as an undrafted free agent on April 27, 2009. The Broncos waived him, but he was signed to the team's practice squad on September 6.

=== New York Giants ===
The New York Giants signed Johnson off the Broncos' practice squad on November 11, 2009. He made his NFL debut in Week 15 against the Washington Redskins, where he recorded two tackles. He played a total of 3 games his rookie season, recording six combined tackles.

He was re-signed by the Giants on April 16, 2010. He played seven games for the Giants before being released on November 20.

=== Tampa Bay Buccaneers ===
On November 24, 2010, the Tampa Bay Buccaneers signed Johnson. He was promoted to the team's active roster on December 8.

He was released by the Buccaneers on September 5, 2011, for final roster cuts before the start of the 2011 season.

=== Minnesota Vikings ===
Johnson was signed to the Minnesota Vikings' practice squad on September 7, 2011.

=== Washington Redskins ===
The Washington Redskins signed him off of the Vikings' practice squad on November 8, 2011. He was released on November 29 by the Redskins.

=== Philadelphia Eagles ===
Johnson was signed to the practice squad of the Philadelphia Eagles on December 2. At the conclusion of the 2011 season, his practice squad contract expired and he became a free agent. He was re-signed to the active roster on January 2, 2012.

=== Indianapolis Colts ===
On July 22, 2012, the Eagles traded Johnson to the Indianapolis Colts for defensive tackle Ollie Ogbu.

The Colts waived him on September 1, 2012, but signed to the team's practice squad the next day. He was waived by the team on October 1.

=== Second Stint with Redskins ===
Johnson re-joined the Redskins on October 23, 2012, after the team signed him to the practice squad. He was activated from Redskins' practice squad on November 6. He was placed on the injured reserve list on January 4, 2013, after spraining a ligament in his left knee in the last regular season game against the Dallas Cowboys

The Redskins released Johnson on February 4.

=== Detroit Lions ===
Johnson was signed to the Detroit Lions on February 6, 2013. On August 23, 2013, he was cut by the Lions.

== Post-NFL Career ==
Current, Johnson is an assistant high school football coach for the Dickinson Gators, a neighboring district just to the north of where he grew up in La Marque, Texas.

== Personal life ==
Johnson's son is Missouri wide receiver, Marquis Johnson.
