= Larry Cowan =

American football player (born 1960)

No. 43, 44, 37, 31
- Position: Running back

Personal information
- Born: July 11, 1960 (age 66); Mobile, Alabama, U.S.
- Listed height: 5 ft 11 in (1.80 m)
- Listed weight: 194 lb (88 kg)

Career information
- High school: Prichard (AL) Blount
- College: Jackson State
- NFL draft: 1982: 7th round, 192nd overall pick

Career history
- Miami Dolphins (1982); New England Patriots (1982); Edmonton Eskimos (1983–1985); St. Louis Cardinals (1987)

Career NFL statistics
- Rushing yards: 3
- Rushing average: 3
- Stats at Pro Football Reference

Lawrence Donnell Cowan (born July 11, 1960) is an American former professional football player who was a running back in the National Football League (NFL) for the Miami Dolphins and New England Patriots in 1982 for a total of eight games. He played college football for the Jackson State Tigers. He also played professionally for the Edmonton Eskimos of the Canadian Football League (CFL).
