= Steve Martin (defensive end) =

American football player (born 1964)

No. 98
- Position: Defensive end

Personal information
- Born: December 24, 1964 (age 61); Angie, Louisiana, U.S.
- Listed height: 6 ft 3 in (1.91 m)
- Listed weight: 260 lb (118 kg)

Career information
- High school: Angie (LA) Varnado High School
- College: Jackson State
- NFL draft: 1987: undrafted

Career history
- Washington Redskins (1987)

Career NFL statistics
- Games played: 3
- Stats at Pro Football Reference

Steven Martin (born December 24, 1964) is an American former professional football player who was a defensive end for the Washington Redskins of the National Football League (NFL). He played college football for the Jackson State Tigers. He received a gold football the year of Super Bowl 50 for being on the Washington Redskins when they won the Super Bowl.

Martin went to Varnado High School and was the first player from Varnado to make it to the NFL.
