= Natchez-Adams School District =

School district in Natchez, Mississippi

Address
- 10 Homochitto Natchez, Adams, Mississippi, 39120; United States

District information
- Superintendent: Zandra McDonald
- School board: 6
- Schools: 8
- Budget: $60,021,000
- NCES District ID: 2803030
- District ID: MS-0130

Students and staff
- Students: 2,554
- Teachers: 195.80 (on an FTE basis)
- Staff: 289.17 (on an FTE basis)
- Student–teacher ratio: 1:13.04

Other information
- Website: natchezadamsschooldistrict.org

The Natchez-Adams School District is a public school district based in Natchez, Mississippi, United States. The district's boundaries parallel that of Adams County.

== Schools ==
- Natchez High School
- Fallin Career and Technology Center
- McLaurin Elementary School
- Morgantown Middle School
- Joseph Frazier Elementary School
- Susie B. West Elementary School
- Natchez Freshman Academy
- Robert Lewis Magnet School
- Natchez Early College

Former North Natchez High School closed in 1989.

== Demographics ==
There were 2,554 students enrolled in the Natchez-Adams School District during the 2024-25 school year.

=== 2006-07 school year ===
There were 4,305 students enrolled in the Natchez-Adams School District during the 2006–2007 school year. The gender makeup of the district was 49% female and 51% male. The racial makeup of the district was 88.97% African American, 10.45% White, 0.39% Hispanic, and 0.19% Asian. 87.0% of the district's students were eligible to receive free lunch.

=== Previous school years ===
| School Year | Enrollment | Gender Makeup | | Racial Makeup | | | | |
| School Year | Enrollment | Female | Male | Asian | African American | Hispanic | Native American | White |
|---|---|---|---|---|---|---|---|---|
| 2005-06 | 4,803 | 50% | 50% | 0.19% | 89.55% | 0.46% | – | 9.81% |
| 2004-05 | 4,526 | 49% | 51% | 0.15% | 87.96% | 0.46% | – | 11.42% |
| 2003-04 | 4,653 | 49% | 51% | 0.17% | 87.51% | 0.32% | 0.02% | 11.97% |
| 2002-03 | 4,796 | 50% | 50% | 0.25% | 86.88% | 0.40% | 0.02% | 12.45% |

== Accountability statistics ==
| | 2006-07 | 2005-06 | 2004-05 | 2003-04 | 2002-03 |
|---|---|---|---|---|---|
| District Accreditation Status | Accredited | Accredited | Accredited | Accredited | Accredited |
School Performance Classifications
| Level 5 (Superior Performing) Schools | 0 | 0 | 0 | 0 | 0 |
| Level 4 (Exemplary) Schools | 0 | 0 | 0 | 0 | 0 |
| Level 3 (Successful) Schools | 1 | 4 | 3 | 1 | 2 |
| Level 2 (Under Performing) Schools | 3 | 0 | 1 | 3 | 2 |
| Level 1 (Low Performing) Schools | 0 | 0 | 0 | 0 | 0 |
| Not Assigned | 2 | 2 | 2 | 2 | 2 |

== See also ==
- List of school districts in Mississippi
