= Reggie Carr =

American football player (born 1963)

No. 99
- Position: Defensive end

Personal information
- Born: February 17, 1963 (age 63); Meridian, Mississippi, U.S.
- Listed height: 6 ft 3 in (1.91 m)
- Listed weight: 300 lb (136 kg)

Career information
- High school: Meridian
- College: Jackson State
- NFL draft: 1986: undrafted

Career history
- Cleveland Browns (1986)*; New York Giants (1987)
- * Offseason or practice squad member only
- Stats at Pro Football Reference

Reginald S. Carr (born February 17, 1963) is an American former professional football player who was a defensive end for the New York Giants of the National Football League (NFL). He played college football for the Jackson State Tigers.
