= Cleo Simmons =

American football player (born 1960)

No. 82
- Position: Tight end

Personal information
- Born: October 21, 1960 (age 66); Mobile, Alabama, U.S.
- Listed height: 6 ft 2 in (1.88 m)
- Listed weight: 225 lb (102 kg)

Career information
- High school: Murphy (Mobile)
- College: Jackson State
- NFL draft: 1983: undrafted

Career history
- Dallas Cowboys (1983); Indianapolis Colts (1985)*
- * Offseason or practice squad member only

Awards and highlights
- All-SWAC (1982)

Career NFL statistics
- Games played: 11
- Stats at Pro Football Reference

Cleo Simmons (born October 21, 1960) is an American former professional football player who was a tight end in the National Football League (NFL) for the Dallas Cowboys. He played college football for the Jackson State Tigers.

== Early life ==
Simmons attended Murphy High School, where he practiced football and basketball. He played as a linebacker and safety.

He accepted a football scholarship from Jackson State University. He was converted into a tight end, playing mainly on special teams in his first years. As a junior, he became a starter.

As a senior, he led the team with 46 receptions for 712 yards and 7 touchdowns. He finished his college career with 54 receptions for 894 yards and 8 touchdowns.

== Professional career ==
=== Dallas Cowboys ===
Simmons was signed as an undrafted free agent by the Dallas Cowboys after the 1983 NFL draft. He was waived on August 29. He was recalled off waivers on August 30, making the team's roster over fourth round draft choice Chris Faulkner. As a rookie, he was the third-string tight end. He was released on August 14, 1984.

=== Indianapolis Colts ===
On March 20, 1985, he was signed as a free agent by the Indianapolis Colts. He was cut on August 19.
