= Claudis James =

American football player (1943–2013)

No. 27
- Positions: Wide receiver, halfback

Personal information
- Born: November 7, 1943; Columbia, Mississippi, U.S.
- Died: February 25, 2013 (aged 69); Jackson, Mississippi, U.S.
- Listed height: 6 ft 2 in (1.88 m)
- Listed weight: 190 lb (86 kg)

Career information
- High school: Marion Central (Columbia)
- College: Jackson State (1963-1966)
- NFL draft: 1967: 14th round, 366th overall pick

Career history
- Green Bay Packers (1967–1968); Los Angeles Rams (1969)*
- * Offseason or practice squad member only

Awards and highlights
- Super Bowl champion (II); NFL champion (1967)

Career NFL statistics
- Receptions: 8
- Receiving yards: 148
- Rushing yards: 15
- Total touchdowns: 2
- Stats at Pro Football Reference

Claudis Ray James (November 7, 1943 – February 25, 2013) was an American wide receiver and halfback in the National Football League (NFL).

== Biography ==
James was born on November 7, 1943, in Columbia, Mississippi. He was the youngest of 11 children of Paul and Dora James. After retiring from football, he founded the first Dixie Youth Baseball League in Columbia and worked for the Mississippi School Supply Company. He was a member of Praise Baptist Church in Jackson, Mississippi. He and his wife Emma James were married for 44 years. He died on February 25, 2013, at the age of 69. At the time of his death from a long illness, James was one of over 4000 former NFL players involved in a lawsuit against the NFL over issues related to concussions.

== Career ==
He played college football at Jackson State University. James was drafted in the 14th round of the 1967 NFL/AFL draft by the Green Bay Packers and played with the team for two seasons. While there, he was a member of the Super Bowl II champion Packers. On July 7, 1969, the Packers traded James to the Los Angeles Rams for an undisclosed draft choice, but the trade was voided later that month when James failed a physical exam with the Rams. The Packers then placed him on injured reserve. He sat out the 1969 season because of a knee injury, and was released by the Packers on August 10, 1970.
