= Larry Hardy (American football) =

American football player (born 1956)

No. 87
- Position: Tight end

Personal information
- Born: July 9, 1956 (age 70); Mendenhall, Mississippi, U.S.
- Listed height: 6 ft 3 in (1.91 m)
- Listed weight: 234 lb (106 kg)

Career information
- College: Jackson State
- NFL draft: 1978: 12th round, 309th overall pick

Career history
- New Orleans Saints (1978–1985)

Career NFL statistics
- Receptions: 71
- Receiving yards: 960
- Touchdowns: 7
- Stats at Pro Football Reference

Larry Hardy (born July 9, 1956) is an American former professional football player who was a tight end for eight seasons in the National Football League (NFL) with the New Orleans Saints. He played college football for the Jackson State Tigers.
