= Roscoe Word =

American football player (born 1952)

No. 47, 33, 24
- Positions: Cornerback, return specialist

Personal information
- Born: July 24, 1952 (age 74); Pine Bluff, Arkansas, U.S.
- Listed height: 5 ft 11 in (1.80 m)
- Listed weight: 170 lb (77 kg)

Career information
- High school: Dollarway (Pine Bluff)
- College: Jackson State
- NFL draft: 1974: 3rd round, 74th overall pick

Career history
- New York Jets (1974–1976); Buffalo Bills (1976); New York Giants (1976); Tampa Bay Buccaneers (1976)

Awards and highlights
- PFWA All-Rookie Team (1974)

Career NFL statistics
- Interceptions: 3
- Return yards: 420
- Return touchdowns: 0
- Stats at Pro Football Reference

Roscoe Word (born July 24, 1952) is an American former professional football player. He was a cornerback and return specialist in the National Football League (NFL) for the New York Jets, Buffalo Bills, New York Giants, and the Tampa Bay Buccaneers. He played college football at Jackson State University.
