= Emanuel Zanders =

American football player (born 1951)

No. 79
- Position: Guard

Personal information
- Born: July 31, 1951 (age 75); Demopolis, Alabama, U.S.
- Listed height: 6 ft 1 in (1.85 m)
- Listed weight: 248 lb (112 kg)

Career information
- High school: U.S. Jones (AL)
- College: Jackson State
- NFL draft: 1974: undrafted

Career history
- Miami Dolphins (1974)*; New Orleans Saints (1974–1980); Chicago Bears (1981)
- * Offseason or practice squad member only
- Stats at Pro Football Reference

Emanuel Zanders (born July 31, 1951) is an American former professional football offensive lineman in the National Football League. He played for the New Orleans Saints from 1974 to 1980, and he played for the Chicago Bears in 1981. He played college football at Jackson State University.

Zanders is a member of the New Orleans Saints Hall of Fame 25 Years All-Time Team. He was a Saints captain from 1976 to 1979. In 1979, he was voted as the Saints Offensive Lineman of the Year. Other honors Zanders received in his professional career was the Soulful Saints, Inc. Offensive Player of the Year, 1978 and the National Sports Foundation Offensive Player of the Year, 1980.

Zanders was inducted into the Jackson State University Sports Hall of Fame in 2004.
