= Judge Hughes =

American football player and coach (1944–2013)

Biographical details
- Born: July 17, 1944; Columbus, Mississippi, U.S.
- Died: July 31, 2013 (aged 69)

Playing career
- c. 1965: Jackson State
- 1967: Atlanta Falcons
- 1969: Atlanta Falcons
- Position: Defensive lineman

Coaching career (HC unless noted)
- 1977–1999: Jackson State (assistant)
- 1999–2002: Jackson State

Head coaching record
- Overall: 30–15

Accomplishments and honors

Championships
- 1 SWAC East Division (1999)

Robert E. "Judge" Hughes (November 17, 1944 – July 31, 2013) was an American football player and coach. He was selected by the Philadelphia Eagles in the 1967 NFL/AFL draft and played in the National Football League (NFL) with the Atlanta Falcons in 1967 and 1969. Hughes served as the head football coach at his alma mater, Jackson State University, from 1999 to 2002, compiling a record of 30–15.

== College career ==
Hughes played as a defensive lineman for the Jackson State Tigers and was named to the JSU All-Century team in 2011; he is also in the university Hall of Fame.

== Professional career ==
Hughes was drafted by the Philadelphia Eagles in the 1967 NFL/AFL draft. He played for the Atlanta Falcons in 1967 and 1969.

== Coaching career ==
Hughes was an assistant football coach and recruiting coordinator for the Jackson State Tigers before being named head coach in 1999. He served in that position for four seasons. In his first season, Hughes led Jackson State to a 9–3 record, winning the Southwestern Athletic Conference (SWAC) East Division title and an appearing in the inaugural SWAC Championship Game in Birmingham, Alabama, which the Tigers lost 31–30. In each of the following three seasons, Hughes' Tigers finished with a 7–4 record. Hughes' overall record at Jackson state was 30–15, with a .667 winning percentage.

== Personal life and death ==
Hughes and his wife Joyce had three children. He died in 2013 from complications of diabetes.

== Head coaching record ==
Year	Team	Overall	Conference	Standing	Bowl/playoffs
Jackson State Tigers (Southwestern Athletic Conference) (1999–2002)
1999	Jackson State	9–3	4–0	1st (East)	
2000	Jackson State	7–4	4–3	3rd (East)	
2001	Jackson State	7–4	5–2	T–2nd (East)	
2002	Jackson State	7–4	5–2	2nd (East)	
Jackson State:		30–15	18–7		
Total:		30–15			
National championship Conference title Conference division title or championship game berth
