= KWHP =

KWHP may refer to:

- WWLS-FM, a radio station in The Village, Oklahoma which held the KWHP calls and was licensed to Edmond from 1962 to 1978
- KWHP-LP, a defunct low-power radio station (104.5 FM) licensed to Plains, Montana, United States
- the ICAO code for Whiteman Airport
