= Sally Hampton =

American film producer and writer (born 1958)

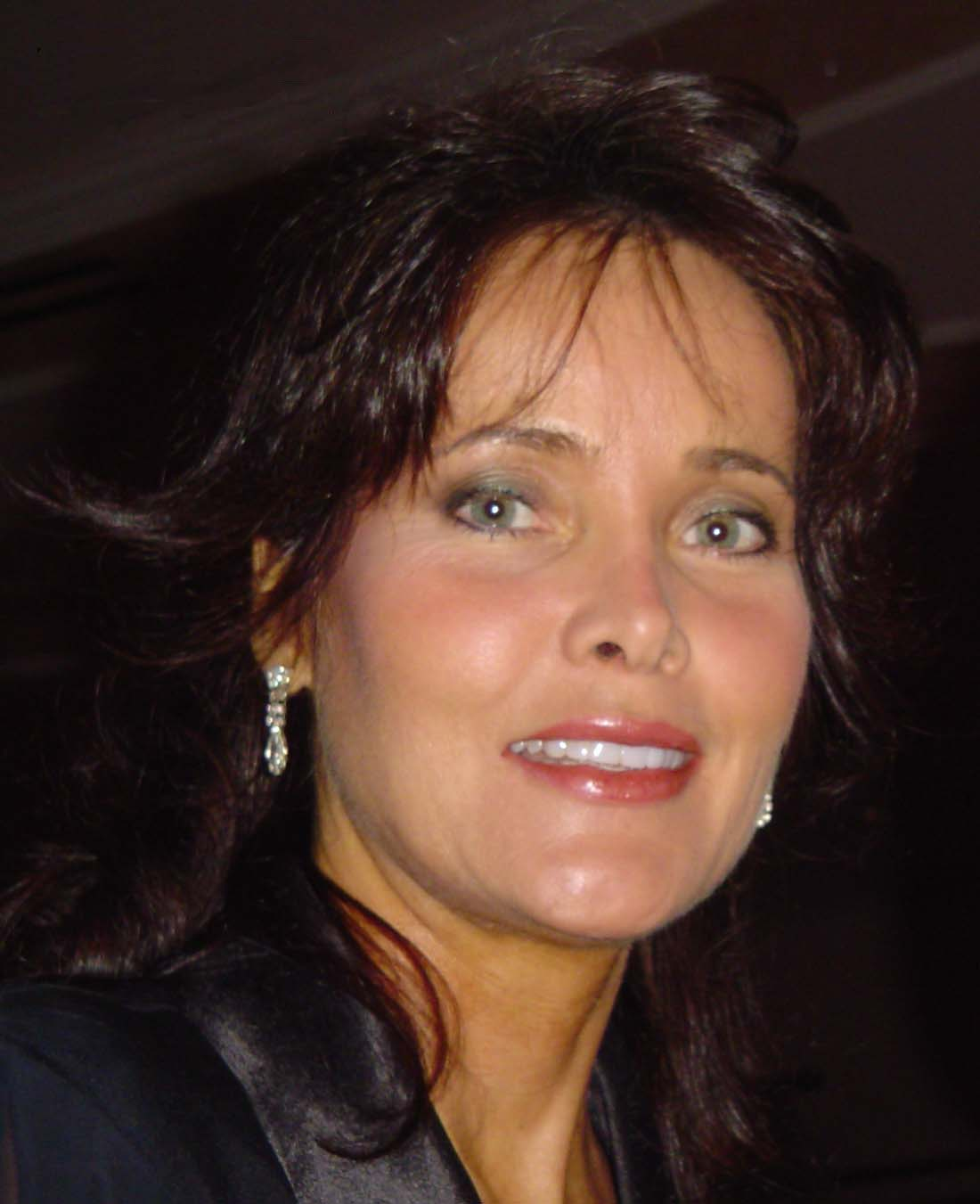
- Born: July 29, 1958 (age 68); Florissant, Missouri
- Occupations: Writer, film producer
- Spouse: Dave Waymer

Sally Hampton (born July 29, 1958 in St. Louis, Missouri) is an American writer and film producer living in the View Park Windsor-Hills neighborhood of Los Angeles.

She is the writer (with Haris Orkin) and producer (with Iain Paterson) of the Wonderful World of Disney movie A Saintly Switch (1999), which she dedicated to the memory of her first husband, Dave Waymer. She also wrote (together with Ben Cardinale) and produced Living Straight (2003).

The Caucus for Television Producers, Writers & Directors honored Sally Hampton with the Distinguished Service Award presented at the Beverly Hills Hotel December 7, 2007.

== Filmography ==
Hampton's acting performances included episodes of the television shows:

- "A Million to Juan"
- "Adam 12"
- "Dragnet"
- "The Law and Harry McGraw"
- "Simon & Simon"
- "Knight Rider"
- "Airwolf"
- "The Dukes of Hazzard"
- "Bare Essence"
- "Trapper John, M.D."
- "The Devlin Connection"
