= McLenahan =

McLenahan is a surname. Notable people with the surname include:

- Hugh McLenahan (1909–1988), English footballer
- Roland McLenahan (1921–1984), Canadian ice hockey player

== See also ==
- McClenahan
- McLenaghan
