= View Park–Windsor Hills, California =

Unincorporated community in California, United States

Windsor Hills, California
- unincorporated community
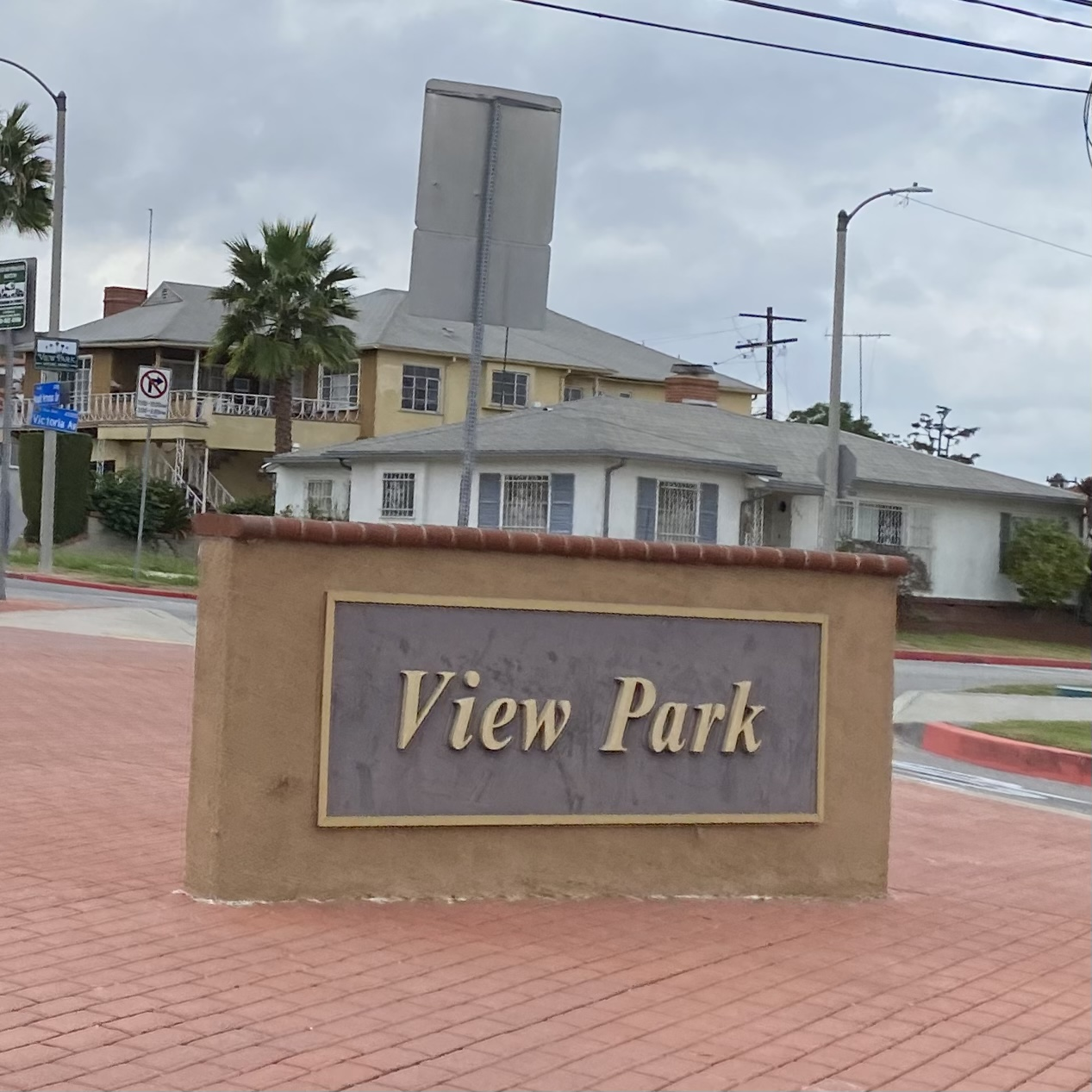
- Interactive map of Windsor Hills, California
- Location of Windsor Hills in Metro Los Angeles Location of Windsor Hills in California Location of Windsor Hills in the United States.
- Coordinates: 33°59′37″N 118°20′49″W
- Country: United States
- State: California
- County: Los Angeles

Area
  - Total: 1.842 sq mi (4.771 km^{2})
  - Land: 1.841 sq mi (4.769 km^{2})
  - Water: 0.00077 sq mi (0.002 km^{2}) 0.04%

Population (2020)
  - Total: 11,419
  - Density: 6,202/sq mi (2,394/km^{2})
- Time zone: UTC-8 (Pacific)
  - Summer (DST): UTC-7 (PDT)
- ZIP Code: 90043
- Area code: 323
- FIPS code: 06-82667

Windsor Hills is an unincorporated community in Los Angeles County, California, United States. The Windsor Hills neighborhood is on the southern end to the north of Slauson Avenue.

Windsor Hills is one of the wealthiest primarily African-American neighborhoods in the United States. The two neighborhoods are part of a band of neighborhoods, from Culver City's Fox Hills district on the west to the Los Angeles neighborhood of Leimert Park on the east, that comprise one of the wealthiest geographically contiguous historically black communities in the Western United States. This corridor also includes the neighborhood of Baldwin Hills and the unincorporated community of Ladera Heights. It was developed between 1923 and 1970. Although the neighborhood is still predominantly African-American, the area is undergoing a demographic shift as new homeowners (mostly white or Asian families), who work in nearby Culver City, Downtown Los Angeles, Santa Monica, and other job hubs move into the neighborhood.

Per the 2020 census, the population of Windsor Hills was 11,419.

== History ==
=== View Park ===
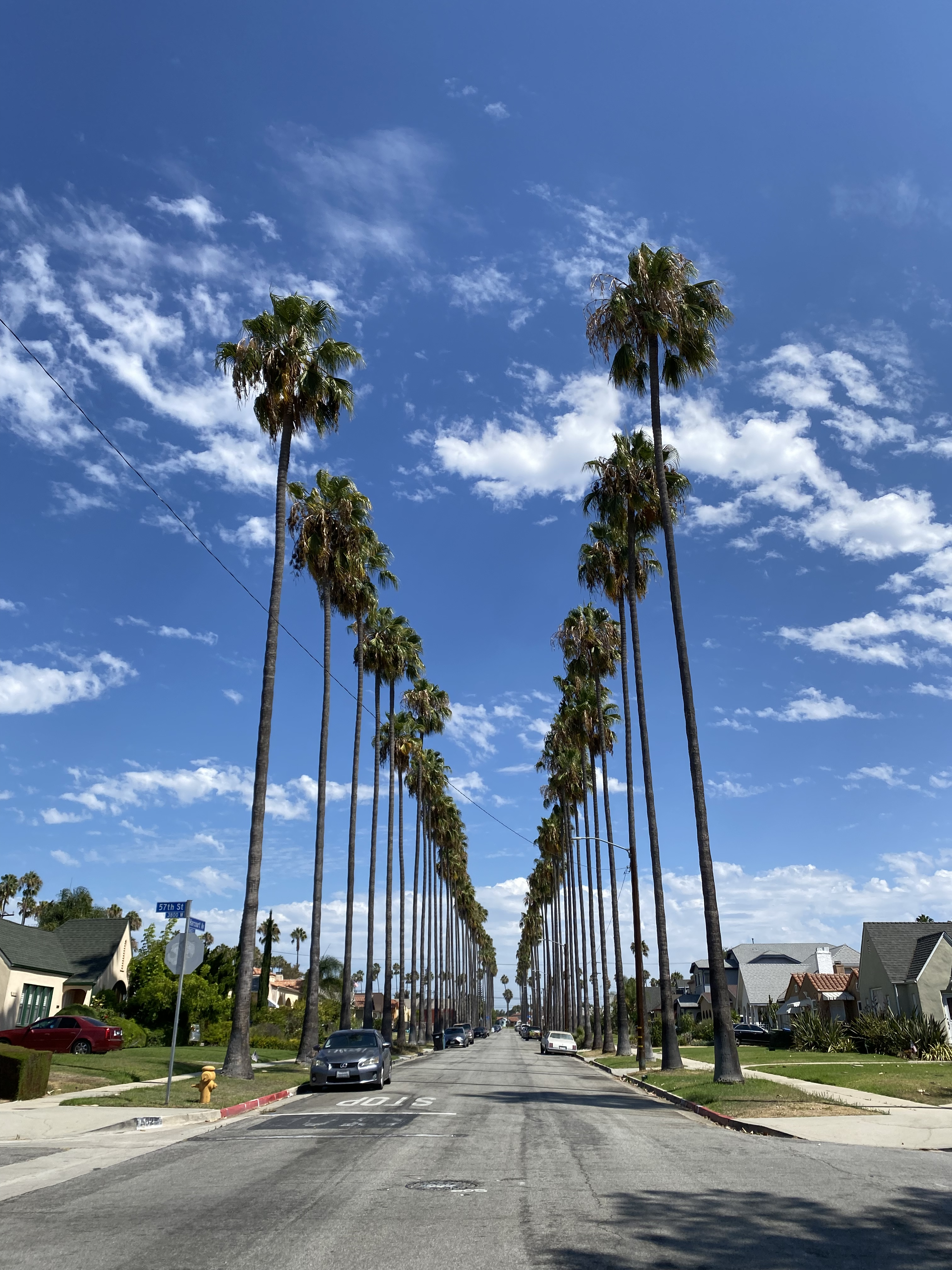
Harcourt Avenue palm trees, View Park

View Park was developed between 1923 and 1970 an upper-class neighborhood by the same developers as Hancock Park, the Los Angeles Investment Company. It is one of the wealthiest African-American areas in the United States. It contains a collection of houses and mansions in the Spanish Colonial Revival Style, Spanish Colonial, Mid Century and Mediterranean Revival Style architecture, most of which remain today. View Park architecture features the work of many notable architects, such as the Los Angeles Investment Company, Postle & Postle, R. F. Ruck, Paul Haynes, Leopold Fischer, H. Roy Kelley, Raphael Soriano, Charles W. Wong, Robert Earl, M.C. Drebbin, Vincent Palmer, Theodore Pletsch and Homer C. Valentine. It is also rumored that renowned African American architect Paul Williams had built several homes in View Park. The only documented Paul Williams home is located at 4351 Mount Vernon Drive.

=== Windsor Hills ===
Windsor Hills was developed in the late 1930s by Marlow-Burns Development Company. It was the first subdivision in Southern California for which the newly created Federal Housing Administration provided mortgage insurance. It also contains a collection of houses and mansions in the Spanish Colonial Revival Style, minimal traditional and Mediterranean Revival Style architecture. African-Americans were forbidden to live in either area until the Supreme Court's invalidation of racial restrictive covenants in 1948.

== Geography ==
=== Climate ===
According to the United States Census Bureau, the CDP has a total area of 1.8 square miles (4.7 km^{2}), all land. The region has a warm-summer Mediterranean climate.

== Demographics ==
For statistical purposes, the United States Census Bureau has defined View Park−Windsor Hills as a census-designated place (CDP). The census definition of the area may not precisely correspond to local understanding of the area. As of end of 2020, View Park-Windsor hills ranks #1 among top 10 richest Black communities in U.S., with an average family income of $159,168.

Historical population
| Census | Pop. | Note | %± |
|---|---|---|---|
| 1970 | 12,268 | | — |
| 1980 | 12,101 | | −1.4% |
| 1990 | 11,769 | | −2.7% |
| 2000 | 10,958 | | −6.9% |
| 2010 | 11,075 | | 1.1% |
| 2020 | 11,419 | | 3.1% |
U.S. Decennial Census; 2010 2020

=== 2020 census ===
View Park-Windsor Hills CDP, California – Racial and ethnic composition Note: the US Census treats Hispanic/Latino as an ethnic category. This table excludes Latinos from the racial categories and assigns them to a separate category. Hispanics/Latinos may be of any race.
| Race / Ethnicity (NH = Non-Hispanic) | Pop 2000 | Pop 2010 | Pop 2020 | % 2000 | % 2010 | % 2020 |
|---|---|---|---|---|---|---|
| White alone (NH) | 530 | 463 | 1,004 | 4.84% | 4.18% | 8.79% |
| Black or African American alone (NH) | 9,557 | 9,209 | 8,048 | 87.21% | 83.15% | 70.48% |
| Native American or Alaska Native alone (NH) | 12 | 18 | 9 | 0.11% | 0.16% | 0.08% |
| Asian alone (NH) | 122 | 143 | 319 | 1.11% | 1.29% | 2.79% |
| Native Hawaiian or Pacific Islander alone (NH) | 7 | 4 | 10 | 0.06% | 0.04% | 0.09% |
| Other race alone (NH) | 38 | 45 | 87 | 0.35% | 0.41% | 0.76% |
| Mixed race or Multiracial (NH) | 395 | 473 | 844 | 3.60% | 4.27% | 7.39% |
| Hispanic or Latino (any race) | 297 | 720 | 1,098 | 2.71% | 6.50% | 9.62% |
| Total | 10,958 | 11,075 | 11,419 | 100.00% | 100.00% | 100.00% |

== Arts and culture ==
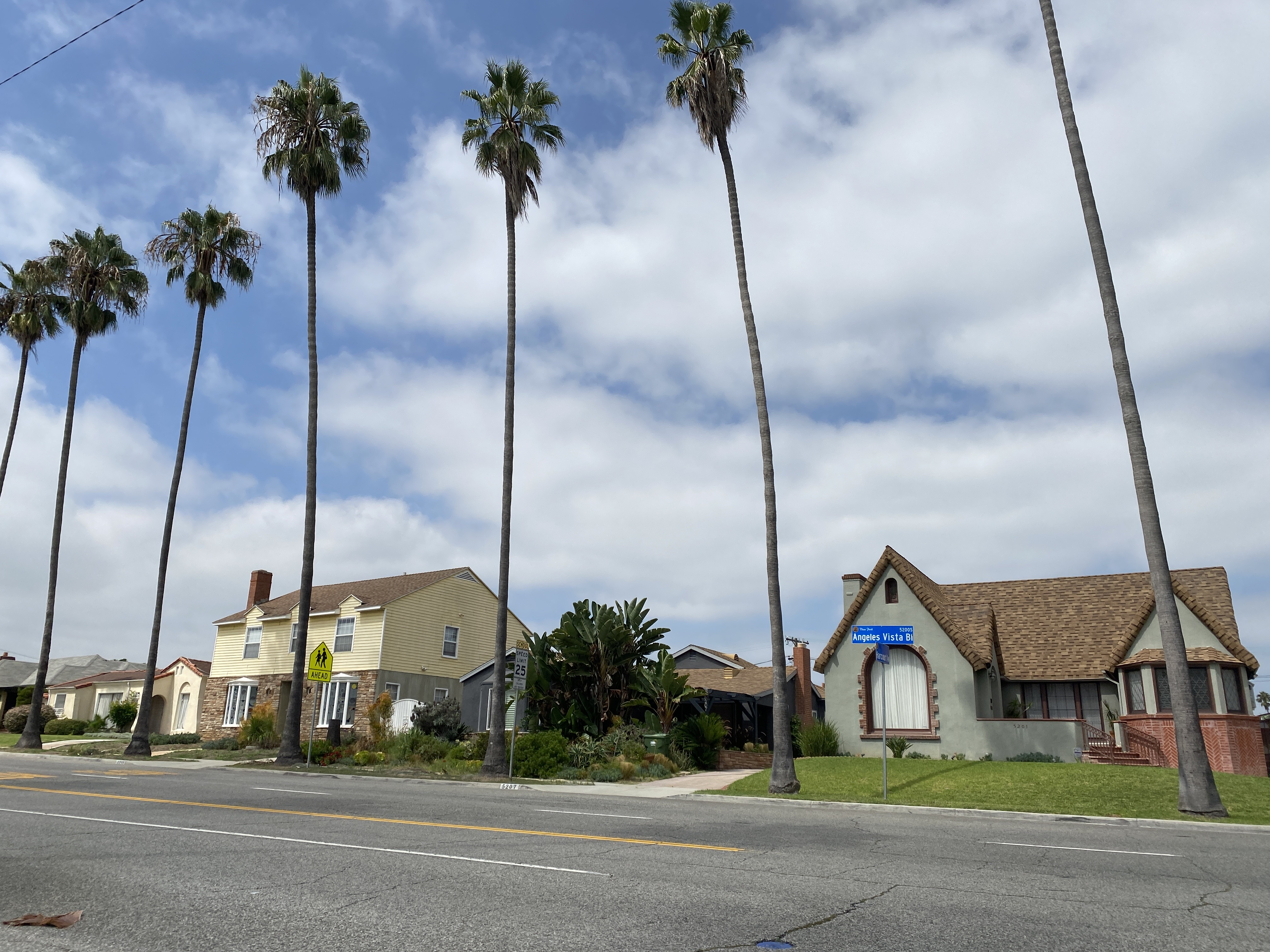
Homes along Angeles Vista Blvd. through View Park

=== National Register of Historic Places ===
On July 12, 2016, View Park was listed on the National Register of Historic Places, an initiative led by View Park Conservancy in which almost 700 View Park residents donated over $100,000 to complete the historic work needed to complete the neighborhood's nomination. View Park is the largest National Register historic district in the country based on African American and county history, and the largest in California in terms of total property owners.

=== Library ===
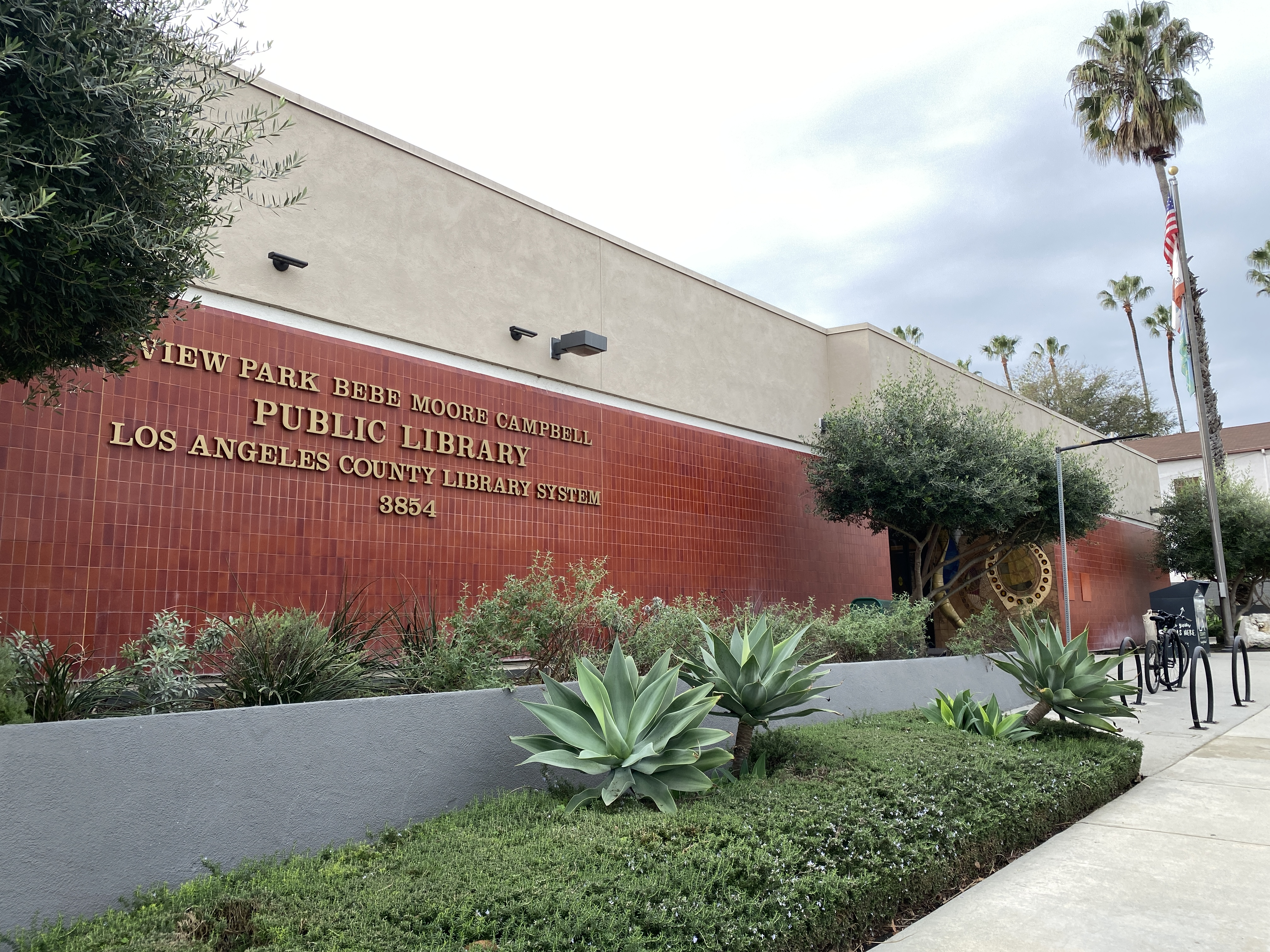
View Park Bebe Moore Campbell Public Library

Library services are provided by the County of Los Angeles Public Library View Park Library. The library is named for the late writer Bebe Moore Campbell, a community resident.

=== Landmarks ===
- Ray Charles Residence at 4863 Southridge Avenue. The home was built in 1965.
- The Googie-style Wich Stand now known as Simply Wholesome is located at Slauson Avenue and Overhill Avenue.
- The Doumakes House. The first historic landmark in unincorporated LA County at Angeles Vista Blvd and West Blvd.

== Parks and recreation ==
View Park-Windsor Hills has a main park called Rueben Ingold Park. The park opened on August 17, 1971, and is adjacent to Kenneth Hahn State Recreation Area with the newly Stocker Trail Corridor pathway to connect the two. Residents also use the Valley Ridge Avenue hill for exercising.

== Government ==
The Los Angeles County Department of Health Services SPA 6 South Area Health Office Ruth-Temple Health Center in Los Angeles, serves View Park-Windsor Hills.

In the state legislature View Park−Windsor Hills is located in the 28th Senate District, represented by Democrat Lola Smallwood-Cuevas, and in the 55th Assembly District, represented by Democrat Isaac Bryan. Federally, View Park−Windsor Hills is located in California's 37th congressional district, which is represented by Democrat Sydney Kamlager-Dove.

== Education ==
=== Schools ===
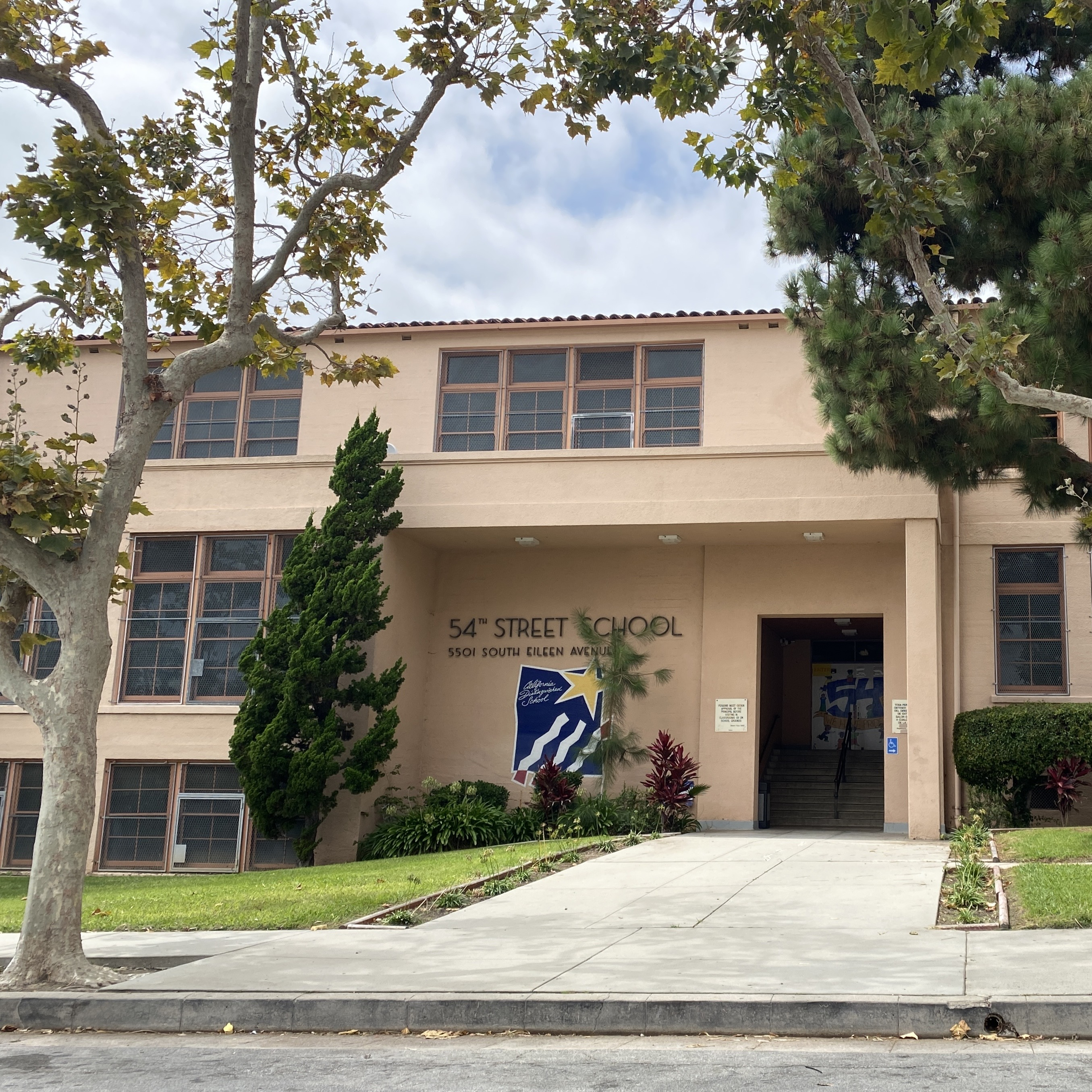
54th Street Elementary School

The CDP community is served by the Los Angeles Unified School District. A portion is also within the Inglewood Unified School District.

Several elementary schools serve the LAUSD portion of community are as follows:

- 54th Street Elementary School (K-5) (View Park)
- Cowan Elementary School (1–5)
- Windsor Math/Science/Aerospace Magnet, 5215 Overdale Drive. (K-5, zoned only for Kindergarten) (Windsor Hills)

All areas in LAUSD are zoned to:

- Audubon Middle School
- Crenshaw High School
- View Park Preparatory High School

Some areas are jointly zoned to Audubon Middle School and Daniel Webster Middle School Some areas are jointly zoned to Audubon Middle School, Orville Wright Middle School, and Palms Middle School. Some areas are jointly zoned to Crenshaw High School and Westchester High School. View Park Preparatory High School also serves as the center school for the View Park neighborhood. The school is an urban preparatory school partnered with LAUSD.

== Infrastructure ==
=== Police services ===
Criminal Law Enforcement Services including patrol are provided by the Los Angeles County Sheriff's Department out of the Marina Del Rey station with a substation in the Ladera shopping center. Deputy Sheriffs also perform traffic enforcement and are often first on scene to vehicle accidents and Fire/EMS calls.

As an unincorporated area, Traffic Law Enforcement Services are provided by the California Highway Patrol (CHP) out of the West LA Area Office in Culver City.

The Los Angeles Unified School District Police has jurisdiction on the areas LAUSD elementary school campuses.

=== Fire/EMS services ===
Fire and EMS services are provided by the Los Angeles County Fire Department Station 58 (Engine and Medic unit) and Station 38 (Engine).

=== Surrounding agencies ===
The Los Angeles City Fire Department and Culver City Fire Department border this area. The Los Angeles, Inglewood, Inglewood School District, and Culver City Police Departments border this area.

== Notable people ==
View Park-Windsor Hills has been home to numerous actors, athletes, Filmmakers and musicians, including:

- Angelle Brooks, actress
- Ermias Joseph Asghedom, known professionally as Nipsey Hussle
- Benoit Benjamin, NBA player
- Charles Burnett, filmmaker and director
- Laphonza Butler, US Senator and former president of EMILY's List
- Bebe Moore Campbell, novelist
- Ray Charles, (1930–2004) Singer
- Sally Hampton, Television Writer and Producer and longtime resident
- James Cleveland (1931–1991), gospel singer, arranger, composer
- Michael Cooper, former NBA player and WNBA head coach
- Loretta Devine, actress
- Bentley Kyle Evans, Television writer and producer
- Curt Flood, former professional baseball player
- Lita Gaithers, Tony Award-nominated playwright, singer/songwriter
- Jester Hairston, composer, arranger, and actor
- Lisa Gay Hamilton, actress
- Louis Johnson, baseball player
- Robert Kardashian, attorney
- Regina King, Academy Award-winning actress and television director
- Mike Love, musician, founding member of the Beach Boys
- Stan Love (basketball), former NBA player, brother of Mike Love
- Bessie McClenahan (1885–1969), USC sociology professor
- Marilyn McCoo, singer
- Meghan, Duchess of Sussex, retired actress, member of the British Royal Family
- Doria Ragland, mother of Meghan, Duchess of Sussex
- Issa Rae, writer, actress, businesswoman and television producer
- Leslie Sykes, retired KABC-TV news co-anchor
- Ike & Tina Turner, recording duo
- Toni Tipton-Martin, American food journalist, culinary historian, editor, and author
- Clara Ward, (1924–1973) gospel singer
- Dave Waymer, NFL football player
- Gerald Wilson, jazz composer, arranger, conductor
- Nancy Wilson, vocalist

== See also ==
- Bel Air
- Baldwin Hills, Los Angeles
- Kenneth Hahn State Recreation Area
