= Los Angeles County Fire Department =

Firefighting service in California

Coordinates: 34°3′N 118°15′W

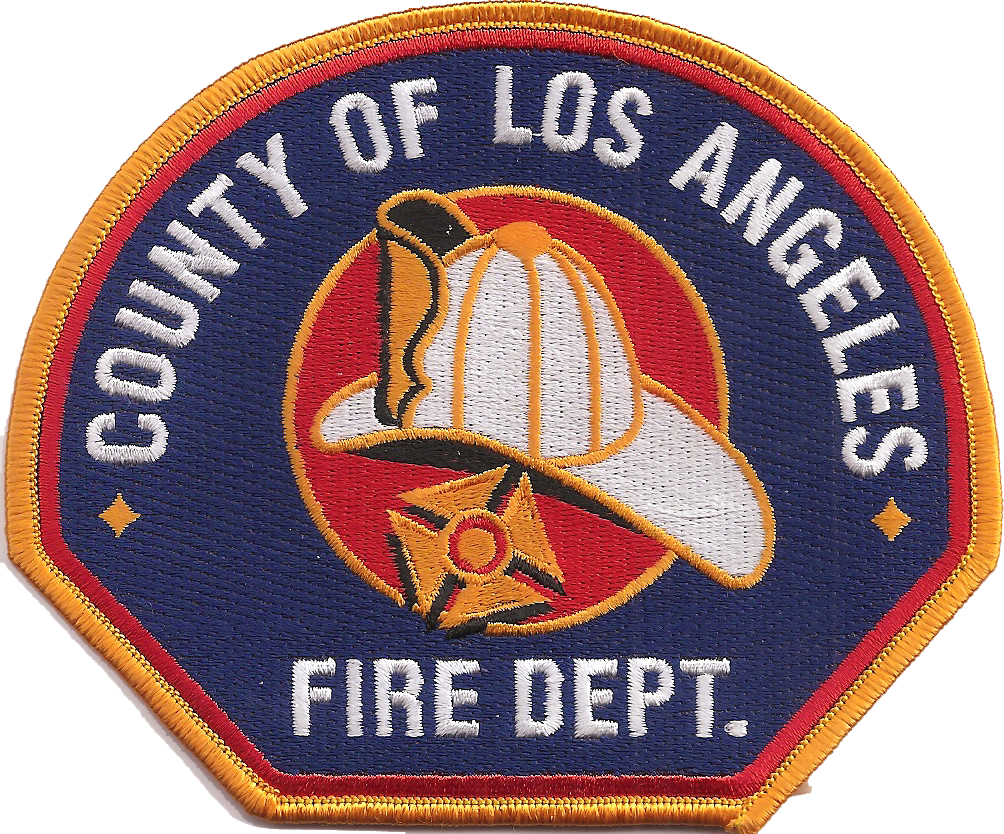

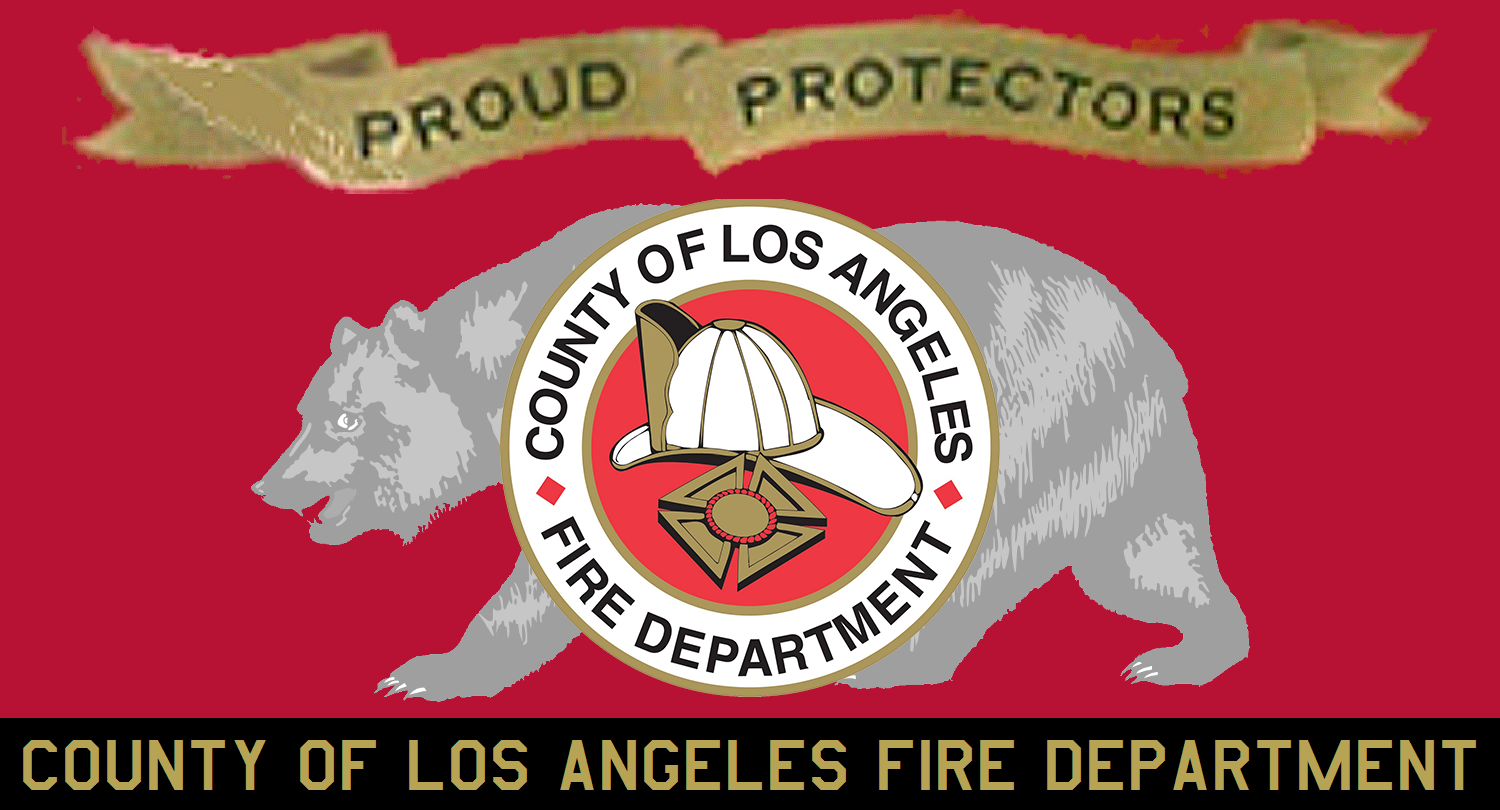

Operational area
- Country: United States
- State: California
- County: Los Angeles

Agency overview
- Established: 1923
- Annual calls: 403,924 (2021)
- Employees: 3000 fire series personnel (2021)
- Annual budget: $1.440 billion (2021)
- Staffing: Career/Paid-On Call
- Fire chief: Anthony Marrone
- EMS level: Basic Life Support (BLS) & Advanced Life Support (ALS)
- IAFF: IAFF local 1014

Facilities and equipment
- Divisions: 9 Divisions
- Battalions: 23 Battalions
- Foam units: 3 Foam Units
- Reserve units: 61 engines 12 quints/trucks 36 paramedic squads
- Stations: 177 Fire Stations
- Engines: 171 frontline Engine Companies (staffed & call) including 5 Paramedic/Advanced Life Support (ALS) Units + 28 Paramedic Assessment Unit (PAU) Units; 61 reserve
- Quints: 34 (including 3 light forces); 12 reserve Quints
- Squads: 76 Frontline Squad Units; 36 Reserve Squad Units
- Tenders: 15 Tender Trucks
- HAZMAT: 3 Hazardous Materials Units
- USAR: 2 Urban Search and Rescue Units
- Wildland: 11 (including 5 OES Type 3 Engines); 42 Patrol Units
- Bulldozers: 10 Bulldozer Units
- Helicopters: 10 Helicopters
- Fireboats: 2 frontline, 1 reserve
- Rescue boats: 8 Fire Rescue Boats + 2 paramedic rescue boats
- Light and air: 3 Light and Air Units

Website
- Official website
- IAFF website

The Los Angeles County Fire Department (LACoFD) provides firefighting and emergency medical services for the unincorporated parts of Los Angeles County, California, as well as 59 cities through contracting, including the city of La Habra, which is located in Orange County and is the first city outside of Los Angeles County to contract with LACoFD.

As of 2021, the department is responsible for just over 4 million residents spread out in over 1.2 million housing units across an area of 2,305 square miles (5,970 km^{2}). The department is commanded by Chief Anthony C. Marrone and has an annual budget of $1.4 billion. According to Firehouse magazine, the LACoFD is the fourth busiest department in the United States, behind New York City Fire Department, Chicago Fire Department, and Los Angeles City Fire Department. The LACoFD has been featured several times in popular culture, including the 1970s NBC TV series Emergency! and the 1950s TV series Rescue 8.

In 2021, the department engaged in 312,550 emergency medical responses and a total of 403,924 total responses.

== History ==
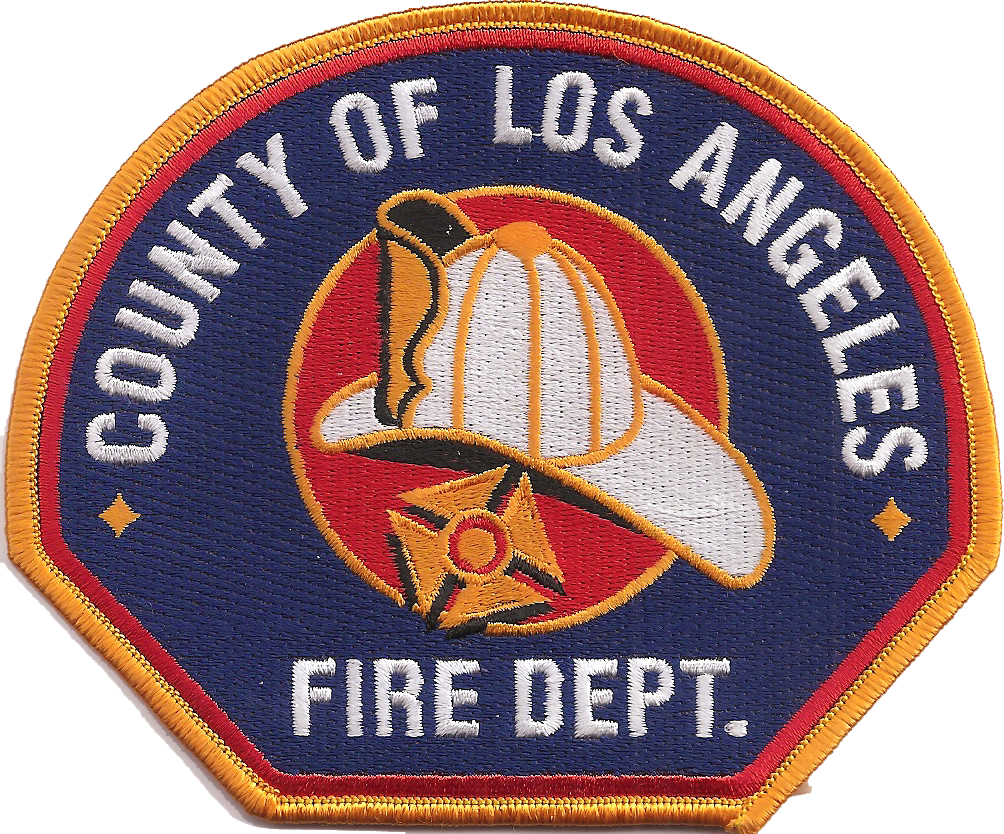
Patch of the LACoFD, worn on the LACoFD's uniform shirt sleeves.

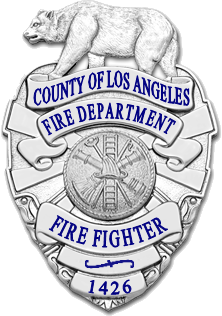
Badge of an LACoFD fireman with badge number 1426.

In 1949, the Consolidated Fire Protection District was established by the Board of Supervisors through the consolidation of numerous fire districts which existed since the 1920s. From 1967 to 1986, there existed four fire protection districts within the Los Angeles County, all of which were governed by the Board of Supervisors: the Consolidated Fire Protection District (CFPD), Universal Fire Protection District, Dominguez Fire Protection District, and Wrightwood Fire Protection District. In addition, there was the Forester and Fire Warden (F&FW) which is a chartered office of the county and was funded by the General Fund. The property tax rate for each district was considerably different.

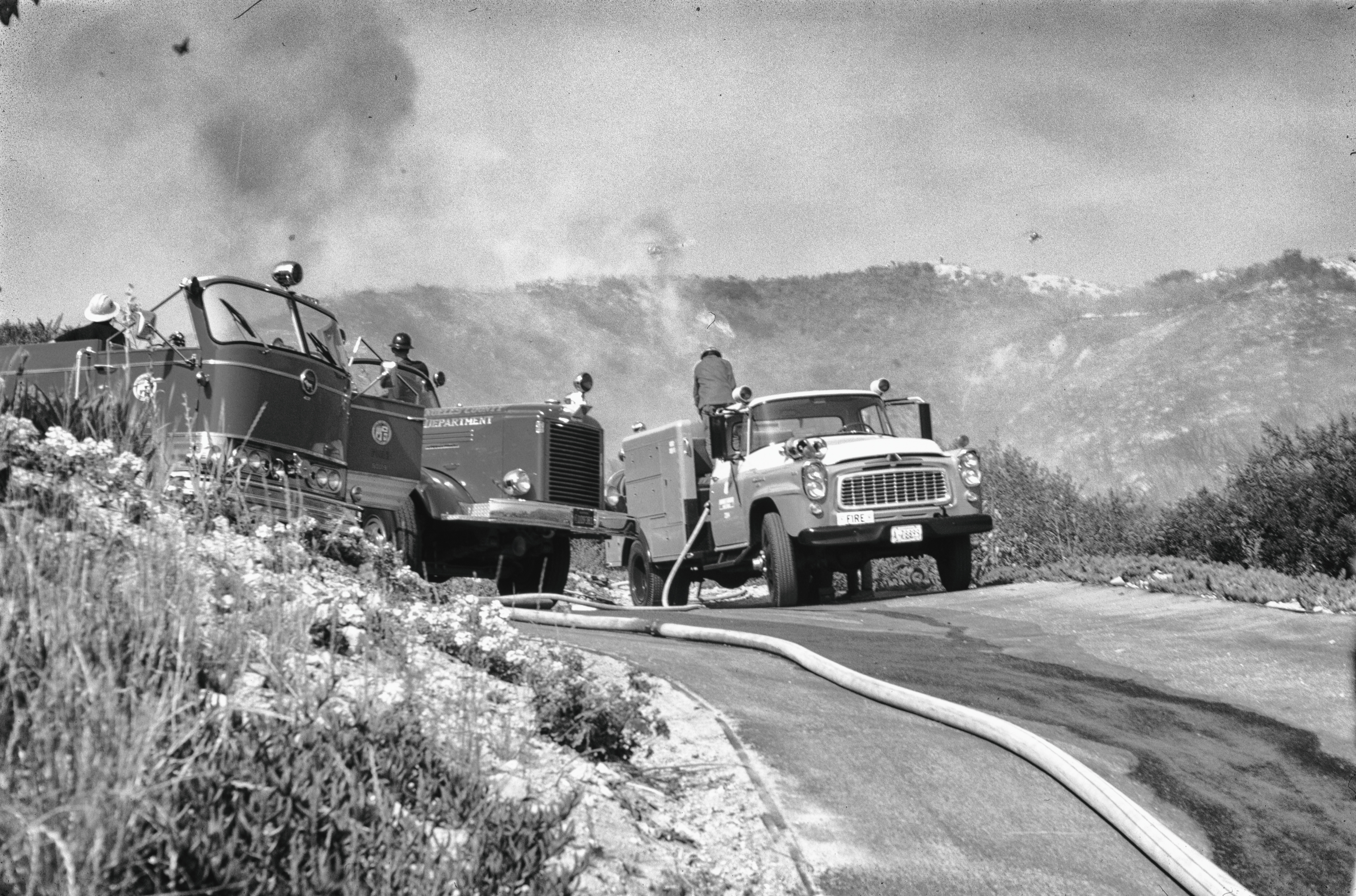
LACoFD and LAFD, July 1964

With the property tax limitations and standardization of tax rates established by Proposition 13 in 1978, there was no longer a need to maintain the separate districts. From 1986 to 1992, the F&FW and the CFPD were the two remaining legal entities that made up what is commonly known as the Los Angeles County Fire Department. In 1992, the CFPD annexed all the remaining unincorporated area in with a corresponding property tax transfer to fulfill the chartered responsibilities of the F&FW.

== Emergency operations ==
The Emergency Operations Bureau includes the Training and EMS Bureau (TEMSB), nine major firefighting divisions, Air and Wildland Division, and Homeland Security Section. The Fire Department's service area includes suburban neighborhoods, city centers, commercial district, sandy beaches, mountain ranges, and more. The region's varying terrain causes unique emergency incident challenges, including increased EMS calls and variety of fires that can take place on a single day (i.e., wildland, structure, railroad, aircraft, vehicle, etc.) as well as ocean rescues and medical calls across 72 miles of coastline.

=== Paramedic Program ===
Since the 1970s, to meet the rising need for emergency medical services, the LACoFD would establish one of the first firefighter/paramedic programs in the world. The department trained 6 firefighters to become paramedics, afterwards they were placed in new squad units at Station 36 in Carson and Station 59 in Whittier. The program would only continue to grow, and today there are more than 100 squad units in frontline or reserve service. The department does not actually fund or service its own ambulance program like the LAFD, instead relying on private ambulance contractors like AMR, or Falck USA. These ambulances are only staffed by EMTs and can only provide BLS-level care, oftentimes requiring a county squad and/or engine with paramedics on board to provide ALS-level care.

=== Fire suppression camps ===
The LACoFD has 10 fire camps with handcrews which are used for both fire prevention and wildland firefighting. In 2013, Los Angeles County signed an agreement to send over 500 nonviolent inmates to firefighting camps in mountain and foothill areas. While there, the inmates were trained to clear flood control basins and fight fires. The camps are run in conjunction with the California Department of Corrections and Rehabilitation and the Los Angeles County Probation Department.

=== Rank structure ===
- Firefighter Trainee (FFT)
- Firefighter/EMT (FF)
- Firefighter/Paramedic (FFPM) or (FP)
- Firefighter Specialist (FFS)
- Fire Captain (FC)
- Battalion Chief (BC)
- Assistant Chief (AC)
- Deputy Chief (DC)
- Chief Deputy (CD)
- Fire Chief (FC)
- Assistant Fire Commissioner (AFC)
- Commissioner (C)

== Apparatus ==
The Los Angeles County Fire Department utilizes a wide array of firefighting apparatus, including engines, quints, trucks, light forces (engine + quint or truck), patrol units, and water tenders. Support apparatus include rescue squads, hazardous materials squads, and urban search and rescue squads. LACoFD uses private ambulance providers such as Care Ambulance Service and McCormick Ambulance Service to provide emergency medical services.

LACoFD apparatus are painted reddish-orange as opposed to LAFD apparatus, which are fire engine red.

=== Tiller trucks ===
While many modern fire departments have opted to go with trucks/quints that have rear-mounted ladders, the LACoFD has chosen to stay with tiller trucks because of their enhanced maneuverability in tight areas. The benefit of a quint is that it also has a built in pump and water tank and can thus operate without an engine. The Tiller trucks carry fire suppression tools and medical equipment as well as specialized rescue equipment for responses to a variety of emergencies.

=== Helicopters ===
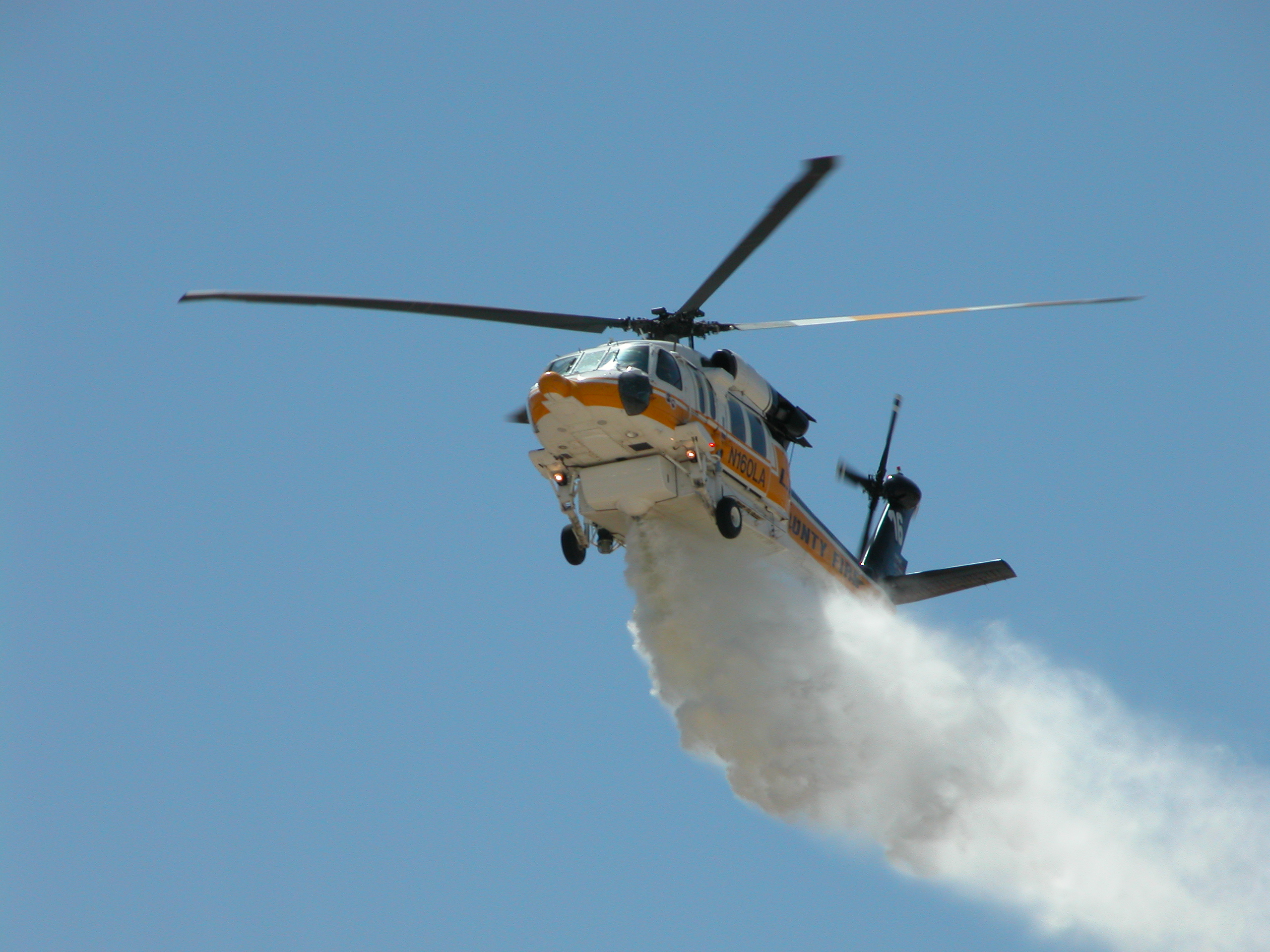
Copter 16, a S-70A Firehawk performs a water drop demonstration.

The LA County Fire Department has 10 helicopters available for aerial firefighting. The headquarters for the Air Operations Section is located at Barton Heliport, next to Whiteman Airport in Pacoima.

- Five Sikorsky S-70A/S-70i Firehawks Copter 20 (was recently changed from Copter 15), Copter 16, Copter 19, Copter 21, and Copter 22 are fitted with 1,000 US gallons (3,800 L) tanks.
- One Bell 412 Copter 12 is fitted with a 360 US gallons (1,400 L) tank.
- Two Bell 412EP Copter 11 and Copter 14 are outfitted with 360 US gallons (1,400 L) tanks.
- 1 Bell 412HP Copter 18 is outfitted with 360 US gallons (1,400 L) tank.
- 1 Bell 412 EPX “Copter 17” Delivered in June 2026. Temporary Registration N133LA. Will be changing to N17LA

=== Stations and apparatus ===
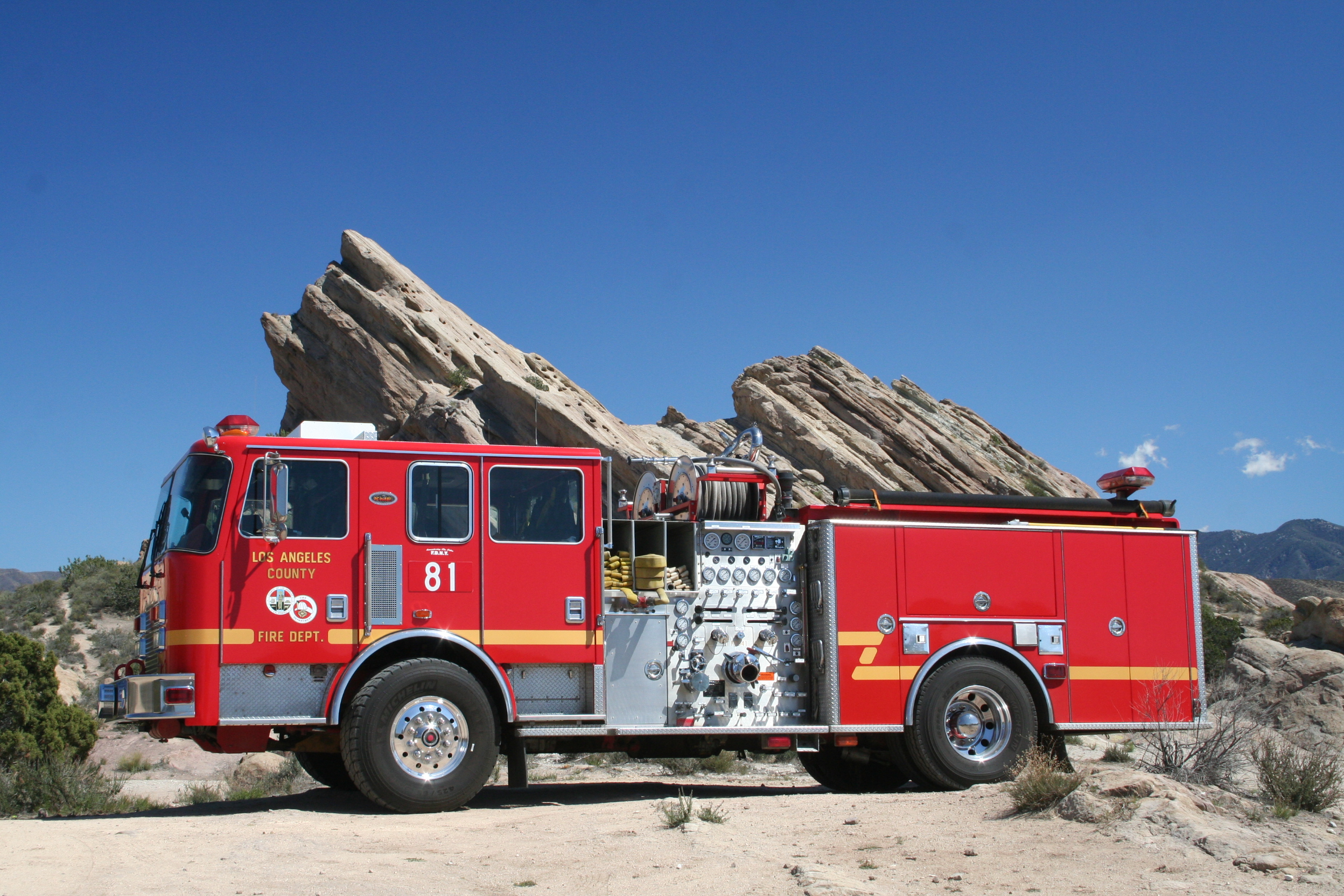
Former Engine Company 81, a 1998 KME triple combination pumper at Vasquez Rocks serving Agua Dulce, California.

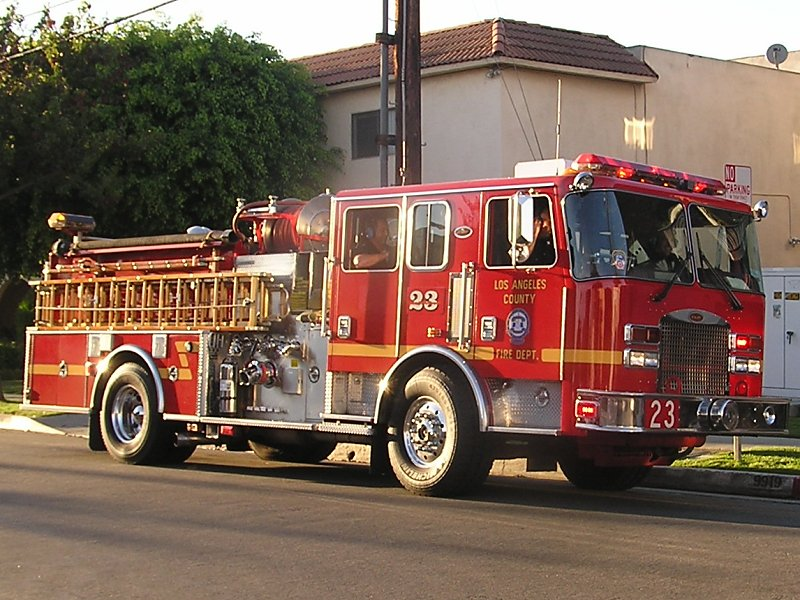
LA County Engine Company 23, serving the city of Bellflower. Engine 23 has been painted in the latest color scheme, red/orange overall with a reflective yellow stripe down the side and a reflective chevron pattern on the back.

As of September 2020.

Some Stations have 2 engines. Engines with a 4+station number are cross-staffed Type 3 wildland engines. Units marked “Medic” are full medic/ALS units (two paramedics on board). Units marked “PAU” are paramedic assessment units (one paramedic on board).

As of March 2022, Rosenbauer America announced a new contract to produce 11 tractor drawn aerial ladder trucks for the LA County Fire Department. The order also sees manufacturing an unknown amount of engines for the department.

As of March 2025, The LA County Fire Department conducted a three day long familiarization program of two Rosenbauer TDAs that were delivered. The program included inspections, testing, and training with over 100 LACoFD personnel including 30 mechanics and 75 firefighters.

As of June 2025, Rosenbauer America announced that the LACoFD has received a delivery of 11 tractor drawn aerial quints, and 8 custom pumper trucks.

Pierce Manufacturing also announced 8 custom built pumper trucks to be delivered to the LA County Fire Department. (Note: This is important because for a long time, KME has been the only manufacturer of LACoFD apparatus (with exceptions).)

| Fire Station or Camp Number or Heliport | City/unincorporated area | Engine Company | Quint Company or Light Force Units | Squad Company | Patrol unit | Other units | Cross-staffed special units | Division | Battalion |
|---|---|---|---|---|---|---|---|---|---|
| 1 | East Los Angeles | Engine 1 | | | | | Foam 1 Fuel Tender 1 | 9 | 3 |
| 2 | Palos Verdes Estates | Engine 2 Engine 402 | | Squad 2 | | | | 1 | 14 |
| 3 | East Los Angeles | Engine 3 | Quint 3 | Squad 3 | | | | 9 | 3 |
| 4 | Rosemead | PAU Engine 4 | Quint 4 | | | Assistant 9 | | 9 | 10 |
| 5 | East San Gabriel/East Pasadena | Engine 5 | | | | | | 9 | 10 |
| 6 | Lomita | Engine 6 | | Squad 6 | | | | 1 | 14 |
| 7 | West Hollywood | Medic Engine 7 | | Squad 7 | | Battalion 1 Utility 1 | | 7 | 1 |
| 8 | West Hollywood | Engine 8 | Light Force 8 | Squad 8 | | | | 7 | 1 |
| 10 | Carson | Engine 10 | | Squad 10 | | Battalion 7 Utility 7 | | 1 | 7 |
| 11 | Altadena | Engine 11 Engine 411 | | Squad 11 | | | OES E8132 | 3 | 4 |
| 12 | Altadena | Engine 12 | | | | | | 3 | 4 |
| 13 | Vernon | Engine 13 | Quint 13 | Squad 13 | | | | 6 | 13 |
| 14 | Los Angeles | Medic Engine 14 | | Squad 14 | | | | 6 | 20 |
| 15 | Whittier | | Quint 15 | | | | | 4 | 21 |
| 16 | Los Angeles | Engine 16 Engine 9 (Note: Originally Engine 216, redesignated in 2009 to honor Firefighter Jim Howe.) | | Squad 16 | | | | 6 | 13 |
| 17 | Whittier | Engine 17 | | | | | | 4 | 8 |
| 18 | Lennox | Medic Engine 18 | | | | | | 6 | 20 |
| 19 | La Cañada Flintridge | Engine 19 | | Squad 19 | | | | 3 | 4 |
| 20 | Norwalk | Engine 20 | Quint 20 | Squad 20 | | | | 4 | 21 |
| 21 | Lawndale | Engine 21 Engine 421 | | Squad 21 | | | ESU 21 | 1 | 18 |
| 22 | Commerce | Engine 22 | | | | | | 9 | 3 |
| 23 | Bellflower | Engine 23 | | | | | | 4 | 9 |
| 24 | Palmdale | Engine 24 | Quint 24 | | | | | 5 | 17 |
| 25 | Pico Rivera | Engine 25 | | | | | | 4 | 8 |
| 26 | La Puente | Engine 26 | | Squad 26 | | | | 8 | 12 |
| 27 | Commerce | Engine 27 | Quint 27 | | | Battalion 3 Utility 3 | | 9 | 3 |
| 28 | Whittier | PAU Engine 28; Engine 428 | Quint 28 | Squad 28 | | Battalion 8 Utility 8 | | 4 | 8 |
| 29 | Baldwin Park | Engine 29 | Quint 29 | Squad 29 | | | | 2 | 16 |
| 30 | Cerritos | Engine 30 | Quint 30 | Squad 30 | | Assistant 4 Battalion 9 Utility 9 | | 4 | 9 |
| 31 | Paramount | Engine 31 | Quint 31 | Squad 31 | | | | 4 | 9 |
| 32 | Azusa | Engine 32 | | Squad 32 | | Water Tender 32 | MCI-32 | 2 | 16 |
| 33 | Lancaster | Medic Engine 33 Engine 233; Engine 433 | Quint 33 | Squad 33 | Patrol 84 | AP-11 Battalion 11 Utility 11 | RAC 33 | 5 | 11 |
| 34 | Hawaiian Gardens | Engine 34 | | | | | | 4 | 9 |
| 35 | Cerritos | Engine 35 | | | | | | 4 | 21 |
| 36 | Carson | Engine 36 Engine 236 | | Squad 36 | | | | 1 | 7 |
| 37 | Palmdale | PAU Engine 37 | | Squad 37 | | | | 5 | 17 |
| 38 | View Park | Engine 38 | | | | | | 7 | 1 |
| 39 | Bell Gardens | Engine 39 | | Squad 39 | | | | 9 | 3 |
| 40 | Pico Rivera | Engine 40 | | Squad 40 | | | | 4 | 8 |
| 41 | Willowbrook | PAU Engine 41 | | Squad 41 | | | | 1 | 7 |
| 42 | Rosemead | Engine 42 | | | | | | 9 | 10 |
| 43 | Industry | Engine 43 | | | | HazMat 43 HazMat Tender 43 | | 8 | 12 |
| 44 | Duarte | Engine 44 Engine 244; Engine 444 | | | Patrol 44 | | OES E8134 | 2 | 16 |
| 45 | Lakewood | Engine 45 | Quint 45 | Squad 45 | | | | 4 | 9 |
| 47 | Temple City | Engine 47 | | Squad 47 | | | | 9 | 10 |
| 48 | Irwindale | Engine 48 | | | | | | 2 | 16 |
| 49 | La Mirada | Engine 49 | | Squad 49 | | Battalion 21 Utility 21 | | 4 | 21 |
| 50 | Commerce | Engine 50 | | Squad 50 | | | | 9 | 3 |
| 51 | Universal City | Engine 51 | Quint 51 | Squad 51 | | QRV51 | | 7 | 1 |
| 52 | Vernon | Engine 52 | | | | | | 6 | 13 |
| 53 | Rancho Palos Verdes | Engine 53 | | | | | | 1 | 14 |
| 54 | South Gate | Engine 54 | | Squad 54 | | | RAC 54 | 6 | 13 |
| 55 | Avalon | Engine 55 Engine 255 | | | Patrol 55 Patrol 255 | Command 55 Helitender 6 (Catalina Airport) | | 1 | 14 |
| 56 | Rolling Hills | Engine 56 | | | Patrol 56 | | | 1 | 14 |
| 57 | South Gate | Engine 57 | | | | | | 6 | 13 |
| 58 | Ladera Heights | Engine 58 | | Squad 58 | | | | 7 | 1 |
| 59 | Whittier | Medic Engine 59 | | | Patrol 59 (reserve) | | | 4 | 8 |
| 60 | Signal Hill | Medic Engine 60 | | | | | | 4 | 9 |
| 61 | Walnut | Engine 61 | | Squad 61 | | | | 8 | 12 |
| 62 | Claremont | PAU Engine 62 | | | Patrol 62 | | | 2 | 2 |
| 63 | La Crescenta | Engine 63 | | | | | | 3 | 4 |
| 64 | San Dimas | Engine 64 | Quint 64 | Squad 64 | | Battalion 2 Utility 2 | | 2 | 2 |
| 65 | Agoura Hills | Engine 65 | | | Patrol 65 | | | 7 | 5 |
| 66 | Kinneloa Mesa/Eaton Canyon | Engine 66 | | | Patrol 66 | | | 3 | 4 |
| 67 | Monte Nido | Engine 67 | | | Patrol 67 | | | 7 | 23 |
| 68 | Calabasas | Engine 68 | | Squad 68 | | | | 7 | 5 |
| 69 | Topanga | PAU Engine 69 Engine 269 (Note: Staffed by on call personnel.) | | | Patrol 69 | | | 7 | 23 |
| 70 | Malibu | Engine 70 Engine 470 | | | Patrol 70 | Assistant 7 Battalion 23 Utility 23 Water Tender 70 Swift Water 70 | | 7 | 23 |
| 71 | Malibu | Engine 71 Engine 271 (Note: Staffed by on call personnel, housed in a separate yard.) | | Squad 71 | Patrol 71 | | | 7 | 23 |
| 72 | Malibu | Engine 72 | | | Patrol 72 | | | 7 | 5 |
| 73 | Santa Clarita | Engine 73 | | Squad 73 | Patrol 73 (Reserve) | Swift Water 73 | Foam 73 | 3 | 6 |
| 74 | Kagel Canyon | Engine 74 | | | Patrol 74 | | | 3 | 4 |
| 75 | Chatsworth | Engine 75 | | | Patrol 75 | | | 3 | 5 |
| 76 | Valencia | Engine 76 | | | Patrol 76 (Reserve) | | | 3 | 6 |
| 77 | Gorman | PAU Engine 77 Engine 477 | | | Patrol 77 | Helitender 7 | | 3 | 6 |
| 78 (Note: Staffed by on call personnel.) | Lake Hughes | PAU Engine 78 | | | Patrol 78 | | | 5 | 11 |
| 79 | Pearblossom | Engine 79 Engine 279 (Note: Staffed by on call personnel.) | | | Patrol 79 | | | 5 | 17 |
| 80 | Acton | Engine 80 | | | Patrol 80 | Water Tender 80 | | 5 | 17 |
| 81 | Agua Dulce | Engine 81 | | | Patrol 81 | | | 3 | 22 |
| 82 | La Cañada Flintridge | Engine 82 Engine 282 | Lightforce 82 | | Patrol 82 | Battalion 4 Utility 4 | | 3 | 4 |
| 83 | Rancho Palos Verdes | Engine 83 | | | Patrol 83 | | | 1 | 14 |
| 84 | Quartz Hill | Engine 84 | | Squad 84 | | | | 5 | 11 |
| 85 | Glendora | Engine 85 Engine 485 | | | | EST 85 | OES E8135 | 2 | 2 |
| 86 | Glendora | Engine 86 Engine 286 | | | Patrol 86 | | | 2 | 2 |
| 87 | Industry | Engine 87 | | Squad 87 | | Water Tender 87 Swift Water 87 | Deluge 87 MAL87 | 8 | 12 |
| 88 | Malibu | Engine 88 | | Squad 88 | | | | 7 | 23 |
| 89 | Agoura Hills | Engine 89 | Quint 89 | Squad 89 | | Battalion 5 Utility 5 | | 7 | 5 |
| 90 | South El Monte | Engine 90 | | Squad 90 | | | | 9 | 10 |
| 91 | Hacienda Heights | PAU Engine 91 | | | Patrol 91 | | | 8 | 12 |
| 92 | Littlerock | Engine 92 | | Squad 92 | Patrol 92 | | | 5 | 17 |
| 93 | Palmdale | Engine 93; Engine 493 | | Squad 93 | | AP-17 Battalion 17 Utility 17 | ESU 93 | 5 | 17 |
| 94 | Lakewood | Engine 94 | | | EST94 | | | 4 | 9 |
| 95 | Gardena | Engine 95 | | | | | | 1 | 7 |
| 96 | Whittier | Engine 96 | | | | | | 4 | 8 |
| 97 | Azusa | Engine 97 | | | Patrol 97 | | | 2 | 16 |
| 98 | Bellflower | Engine 98 | | Squad 98 | | | | 4 | 9 |
| 99 | Malibu | Engine 99 | | | Patrol 99 | | | 7 | 23 |
| 100 | Hermosa Beach | PAU Engine 100 | | Squad 100 | | | | 1 | 18 |
| 101 | Claremont | Engine 101 | | Squad 101 | | | | 2 | 2 |
| 102 | Claremont | Engine 102 | | | Patrol 102 | | | 2 | 2 |
| 103 | Pico Rivera | PAU Engine 103 | | | | USAR 103 Heavy Rescue 103 Rescue Tender 103 Swift Water 103 | | 4 | 8 |
| 104 | Santa Clarita | | Quint 104 | Squad 104 | | | | 3 | 22 |
| 105 | Rancho Dominguez | Engine 105 | | | | HazMat 105 HazMat Tender 105 | Deluge 105 | 1 | 7 |
| 106 | Rolling Hills Estates | Engine 106 | Quint 106 | Squad 106 | Patrol 106 | Battalion 14 Utility 14 | | 1 | 14 |
| 107 | Santa Clarita | Engine 107 | | Squad 107 | | | | 3 | 22 |
| 108 | Santa Clarita | Engine 108 | | | | | | 3 | 22 |
| 110 | Marina del Rey | PAU Engine 110 | Quint 110 | | | Boat 110 Boat 310 Boat 510 | | 7 | 1 |
| 111 | Santa Clarita | Engine 111 | | Squad 111 | | | | 3 | 22 |
| 112 (Note: Staffed by on call personnel.) | Antelope Acres | Engine 112 | | | | | | 5 | 11 |
| 114 | Lake Los Angeles | PAU Engine 114 Engine 314 | | | Patrol 114 | | | 5 | 17 |
| 115 | Norwalk | Engine 115 | | Squad 115 | | | | 4 | 21 |
| 116 | Carson | Engine 116 | Quint 116 | Squad 116 | | | | 1 | 7 |
| 117 | Lancaster | Engine 117 Engine 317 (Note: Staffed by on call personnel.) | | | | Water Tender 117 | | 5 | 11 |
| 118 | Industry | Engine 118; Engine 4118 | Quint 118 | Squad 118 | | | MIRV 118 Command 3 Command 33 | 8 | 12 |
| 119 | Diamond Bar | Engine 119 | | Squad 119 | | | | 8 | 12 |
| 120 | Diamond Bar | Engine 120 | | | Patrol 120 | Water Tender 120 | | 8 | 15 |
| 121 | Diamond Bar | Engine 121 | | | | | | 8 | 15 |
| 122 | Lakewood | Engine 122 | | | | | | 4 | 9 |
| 123 | Santa Clarita | Engine 123 | | | Patrol 123 | | | 3 | 22 |
| 124 | Stevenson Ranch | Engine 124 | | Squad 124 | | | | 3 | 6 |
| 125 | Calabasas | Engine 125; Engine 4125 | | | | | OES E8133 | 7 | 5 |
| 126 | Santa Clarita | Engine 126 | Quint 126 | | | Command 11 Battalion 6 Utility 6 | RAC 126 | 3 | 6 |
| 127 (Note: Station 127 served as Station 51 on the famous tv-show "Emergency".) | Carson | | Quint 127 | | | | Foam 127 | 1 | 7 |
| 128 | Santa Clarita | Engine 128 | | | Patrol 128 | Water Tender 128 | | 3 | 22 |
| 129 | Lancaster | Engine 129 | | | Patrol 129 | HazMat 129 Dozer Team 5 Helitender 1 (NORTH COUNTY AIR OPS) | MAL129 | 5 | 11 |
| 130 | Lancaster | Engine 130 | | Squad 130 | | Assistant 5 Water Tender 130 | | 5 | 11 |
| 131 | Palmdale | Engine 131 | | Squad 131 | | | | 5 | 17 |
| 132 | Santa Clarita | Engine 132 Engine 4132 | | | Patrol 132 | | OES E8131 | 3 | 22 |
| 134 | Lancaster | Engine 134 | | Squad 134 | | | | 5 | 11 |
| 135 | Lancaster | Engine 135 | | Squad 135 | | | MIRV135 | 5 | 11 |
| 136 | Palmdale | PAU Engine 136 | | | | USAR 136 Rescue Tender 136 Swift Water 136 | | 5 | 17 |
| 140 (Note: Staffed by on call personnel.) | Leona Valley | Engine 140 | | | | | | 5 | 11 |
| 141 | San Dimas | Engine 141 | | | | | | 2 | 2 |
| 143 | Castaic | Engine 143 Engine 4143 | | | | Water Tender 4143 | | 3 | 6 |
| 144 | Westlake Village | PAU Engine 144 | | | Patrol 144 | Water Tender 144 | | 7 | 5 |
| 145 | Rowland Heights | Engine 145 | | | | EST145 Battalion 12 Utility 12 | | 8 | 12 |
| 146 | Walnut | Engine 146 | | | | | | 8 | 12 |
| 147 | Lynwood | | Quint 147 | Squad 147 | | | | 6 | 13 |
| 148 | Lynwood | Engine 148 | | | | | | 6 | 13 |
| 149 | Castaic | Engine 149 | | Squad 149 | | | | 3 | 6 |
| 150 | Santa Clarita | Engine 150 | | | Patrol 150 | Assistant 3 Battalion 22 Utility 22 HazMat 150 Hazmat Tender 150 Command 1 | OES HM11 | 3 | 22 |
| 151 | Glendora | Engine 151 | | Squad 151 | | | | 2 | 2 |
| 152 | Covina | Engine 152 | | | | | ESU152 | 2 | 16 |
| 153 | Covina | | Quint 153 | | | | | 2 | 16 |
| 154 | Covina | PAU Engine 154 | | Squad 154 | | Assistant 2 Battalion 16 Utility 16 | | 2 | 16 |
| 155 (Note: Staffed by on call personnel.) | Two Harbors | Engine 155 | | | Patrol 155 | | | 1 | 14 |
| 156 | Santa Clarita | Engine 156 | | | | Water Tender 156 Helitender 2 Dozer Team 7 | | 3 | 6 |
| 157 (Note: Staffed by on call personnel.) | Green Valley | Engine 157 | | | | | | 5 | 11 |
| 158 | Gardena | | Quint 158 | Squad 158 | | Assistant 1 | | 1 | 18 |
| 159 | Gardena | Engine 159 | | | | | ESU159 | 1 | 18 |
| 160 | Hawthorne | Engine 160 | | | | | | 1 | 18 |
| 161 | Hawthorne | | Quint 161 | Squad 161 | | Battalion 18 Utility 18 | MCI-161 | 1 | 18 |
| 162 | Hawthorne | Engine 162 | | | | | | 1 | 18 |
| 163 | Bell | Engine 163 | | Squad 163 | | | | 9 | 3 |
| 164 | Huntington Park | Engine 164 | Quint 164 | Squad 164 | | Assistant 6 Battalion 13 Utility 13 | | 6 | 13 |
| 165 | Huntington Park | Engine 165 | | | | | MAL165 | 6 | 13 |
| 166 | El Monte | | Quint 166 | | | Battalion 10 Utility 10 | | 9 | 10 |
| 167 | El Monte | Engine 167 | | Squad 167 | | | | 9 | 10 |
| 168 | El Monte | Engine 168 | | | | | | 9 | 10 |
| 169 | El Monte | Engine 169 | | | | | | 9 | 10 |
| 170 | Inglewood | | Paramedic Lightforce 170 | | | | | 6 | 20 |
| 171 | Inglewood | Engine 171 | | Squad 171 | | Battalion 20 Utility 20 | MIRV171 Command 2 Command 22 | 6 | 20 |
| 172 | Inglewood | Engine 172 | | Squad 172 | | | | 6 | 20 |
| 173 | Inglewood | Engine 173 | | Squad 173 | | | | 6 | 20 |
| 181 | Pomona | | | | | Battalion 15 Utility 15 | | 8 | 15 |
| 182 | Pomona | Engine 182 | | Squad 182 | | | | 8 | 15 |
| 183 | Pomona | Engine 183 | | Squad 183 | | | | 8 | 15 |
| 184 | Pomona | Engine 184 | | | | | | 8 | 15 |
| 185 | Pomona | | Quint 185 | | | | | 8 | 15 |
| 186 | Pomona | Engine 186 | | | | | | 8 | 15 |
| 187 | Pomona | | Quint 187 | Squad 187 | | | | 8 | 15 |
| 188 | Pomona | Engine 188 | | | | | | 8 | 15 |
| 191 | La Habra | PAU Engine 191 | | Squad 191 | | La Habra 1 (BLS Ambulance) | | 4 | 21 |
| 192 | La Habra | Medic Engine 192 | | | | | | 4 | 21 |
| 193 | La Habra | Ambulance Station Only | | | | La Habra 2 (BLS Ambulance) | | 4 | 21 |
| 194 | La Mirada | PAU Engine 194 | | | | | | 4 | 21 |
| Camp 2 | Arroyo Seco | | | | | Crew 2-2 Crew 2-3 Helitender 4 Supt 2 Supt 20 Supt 21 Supt 22 | | Air/Wildland | 46 |
| Camp 8 | Malibu | | | | | Engine 8-1 Crew 8-1 Crew 8-2 Crew 8-3 Supt 8 Helitender 3, (WEST COUNTY AIR OPS) | | Air/Wildland | 46 |
| Camp 9 | Santa Clarita | | | | | Engine 9-1 Supt 9 Crew 9-1 Crew 9-2 | | Air/Wildland | 46 |
| Camp 11 | Acton | | | | | Crew 11-1, Crew 11-2, Crew 11-3, Crew 11-4, Supt 11 | | Air/Wildland | 44 |
| Camp 12 | Santa Clarita | | | | | Crew 12-1, Crew 12-2, Crew 12-3, Crew 12-4, Crew 12-5, Supt 12 | | Air/Wildland | 46 |
| Camp 13 | Malibu | | | | | Crew 13-1, Crew 13-2, Crew 13-3, Crew 13-4, Crew 13-5, Supt 13 | | Air/Wildland | 44 |
| Camp 14 | Santa Clarita | | | | | Crew 14-1, Crew 14-2, Crew 14-3, Crew 14-4, Supt 14 | | Air/Wildland | 44 |
| Camp 16 | Tujunga | | | | | Crew 16-1, Crew 16-2, Crew 16-3, Crew 16-4, Crew 16-5, Supt 16 | | Air/Wildland | 44 |
| Camp 17 | La Verne | | | | | Crew 17-1, Crew 17-2, Crew 17-3, Supt 17 | | Air/Wildland | 44 |
| Camp 19 | East Fork | | | | | Crew 19-1, Crew 19-2, Crew 19-3, Crew 19-4, Crew 19-5, Crew 19-6, Supt 19 | | Air/Wildland | 44 |
| Barton Heliport | Pacoima | | | | | Copter 11, Copter 12, Copter 14, Copter 15, Copter 16, Copter 17, Copter 18, Copter 19, Copter 21, Copter 22, Heavy Helitender 1 | | Air/Wildland | 42 |
| Van Nuys Airport | Van Nuys | | | | | Helitanker 55, Quebec 1-(Seasonal), Quebec 2-(Seasonal) | | Air/Wildland | 42 |
| Brackett Field | LaVerne | | | | | Helitender 5, (EAST COUNTY AIR OPS) | | Air/Wildland | 42 |

== Communications Center ==
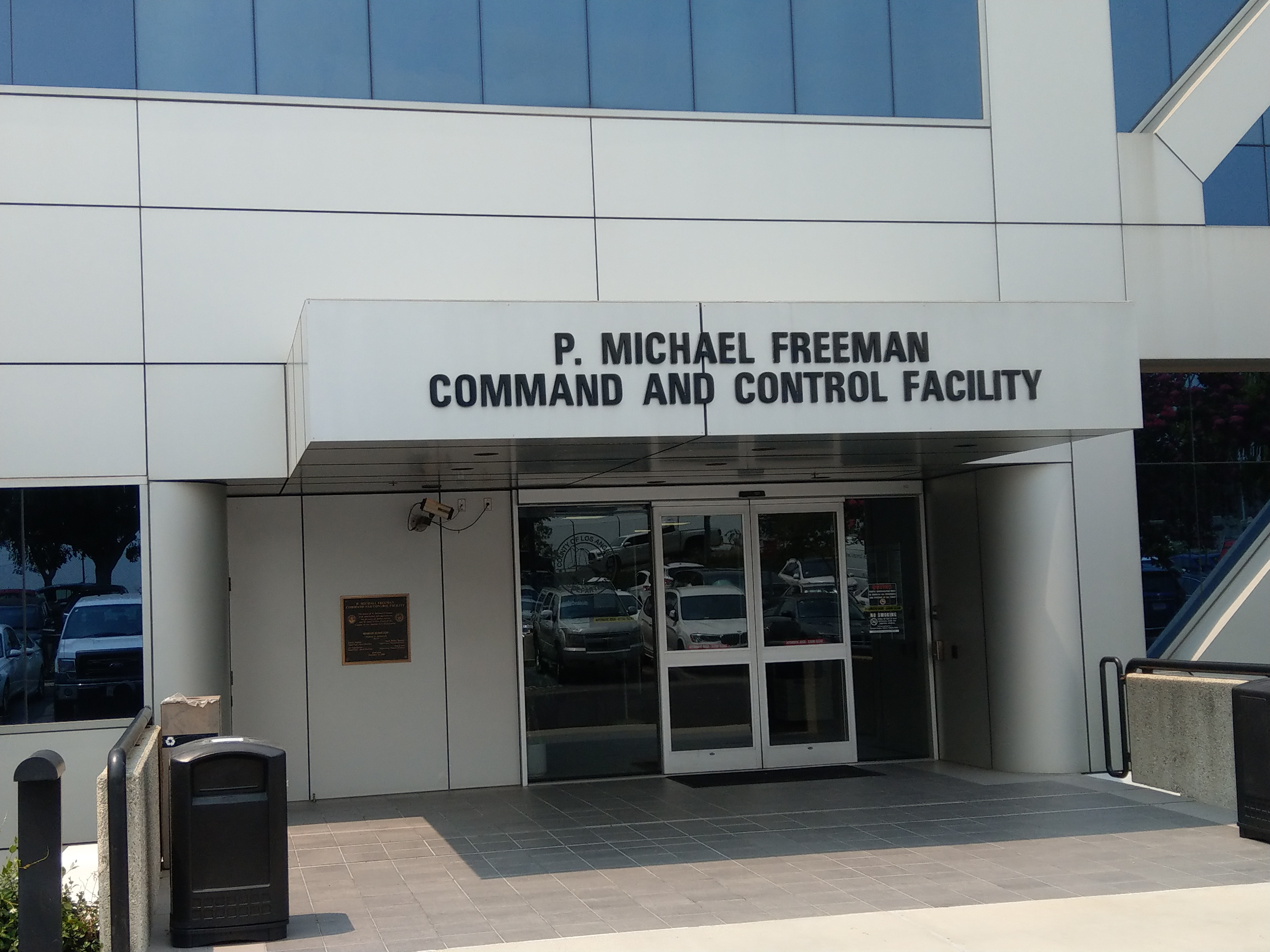
LACoFD Dispatch And Communications Center

The LACoFD is currently dispatched from the P. Michael Freeman Command And Control Facility at the county fire operations center in East Los Angeles. (Location: 34.0526454N, 118.1724628W)

== In popular culture ==
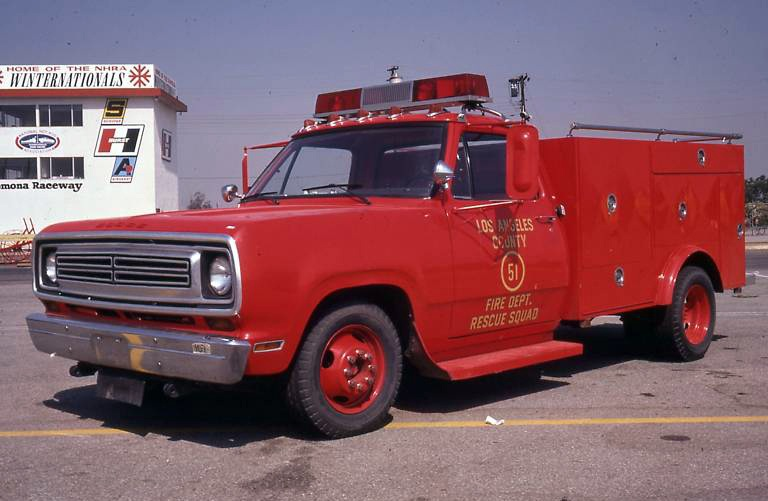
Paramedic Rescue Squad 51 from the NBC-Universal television series, Emergency!.

The Los Angeles County Fire Department has been featured in multiple different television series.

- Rescue 8 – The syndicated series of the late 1950s focused on Rescue Squad 8 and starred Jim Davis and Lang Jeffries.
- Emergency! – The 1970s NBC medical drama was popularly credited for encouraging the widespread adaptation of paramedics. The exterior fire station scenes for the fictional station 51 in the series were shot at county fire station 127. It is now called the Robert A. Cinader Memorial Fire Station in honor of the television producer who made the station famous. In addition, the fire station on the Universal Pictures lot in Universal City, where the series was produced, was initially designated Station 60 during the production of the series, and is now designated Station 51.
- Baywatch – The NBC series starring David Hasselhoff focused on the Los Angeles County Lifeguards, a division of the Los Angeles County Fire Department Baywatch Nights and the 2017 Baywatch film also include the Los Angeles county Fire service.
- Grand Theft Auto V – Los Santos County Fire Department is based on the LACoFD.
- Volcano, 1997 movie featuring Tommy Lee Jones.

== See also ==
- Los Angeles County Lifeguards – division of the LACoFD focused on patrolling the beaches of Los Angeles County
- PulsePoint – Application used by the LACoFD
