= McLenaghen =

McLenaghen is a surname. Notable people with the surname include:

- James McLenaghen (1891–1950), Canadian politician
- Mike McLenaghen (born 1954), Canadian soccer player

== See also ==
- McLenaghan
