= McLenaghan =

McLenaghan is a surname. Notable people with the surname include:

- Nathaniel McLenaghan (1841–1912), Canadian merchant and political figure
- Raymond McLenaghan (born 1939), Canadian theoretical physicist and mathematician

== See also ==
- McLenaghen
- McLenahan
