= A Saintly Switch =

- DVD cover
- Genre: Fantasy comedy
- Teleplay by: Haris Orkin
- Story by: Sally Hampton
- Directed by: Peter Bogdanovich
- Starring: Vivica A. Fox; David Alan Grier; Al Waxman; Scott Owen Cumberbatch; Shadia Simmons; David Keeley; Rue McClanahan
- Music by: Terence Blanchard
- Country of origin: United States
- Original language: English

Production
- Executive producer: Sally Hampton
- Producer: Iain Paterson
- Production location: Toronto
- Cinematography: James Gardner
- Editor: David Baxter
- Running time: 88 minutes
- Production company: Walt Disney Television

Original release
- Network: ABC
- Release: January 24, 1999

A Saintly Switch is a 1999 American fantasy comedy television film directed by Peter Bogdanovich and written by Haris Orkin, based on a story by Sally Hampton. It stars Vivica A. Fox and David Alan Grier, with Al Waxman, Scott Owen Cumberbatch, Shadia Simmons, David Keeley and Rue McClanahan in supporting roles. The plot revolves around an aging NFL quarterback and his stay-at-home wife switching bodies. The resultant comedy focuses on family values as she has to handle the highly-physical job while he has to handle art classes, bonding with his children, and morning sickness.

The film premiered on ABC on January 24, 1999, as an episode of The Wonderful World of Disney.

== Plot ==
Aging NFL quarterback Dan Anderson and his stay-at-home wife Sara are experiencing marital fallout. According to their preteen children, Clark and Annette, they both underestimate each other's role in the family. When Dan's new position with the Saints takes the family to New Orleans, they purchase a dilapidated mansion. Upon arrival, they start fighting worse than ever. The children go up into the attic and discover a book of spells, finding out from their babysitter, the resident voodoo sorceress, that this house once belonged to the most powerful sorceress in the area. Desperate to save their parents marriage, they cast a spell which inadvertently switches their parents' bodies.

The next morning, Dan wakes up in Sara's body, and she vice versa. They try to act like nothing has changed, which means they must do each other's jobs. After managing for about a day or two, still trying to keep the children (who already know what's going on) from finding out, Dan (in Sara's body) goes to the doctor because he (she) is feeling sick and discovers that he (she) is pregnant. The rest of the movie continues in similar fashion: as they live life in the other's body they grow to understand one another.

Thanks to the secret coaching she is receiving from Dan, Sara starts to get better at football. Her nurturing nature leads to her/him implementing the sort of "reward" list and tactics usually expected in a classroom. Surprisingly, this encourages the team so much that they start winning match after match. On the other hand, Dan is learning how to keep house and, though still rather uncomfortable, is rather enjoying his/her pregnancy and getting closer to the children in the process. As time passes, both parents really begin to understand what the other was complaining about, commenting on this to one another and wondering if they'll ever switch back or if they'll be stuck in each other's bodies for the rest of their lives.

When the pregnancy is about nine months along, the Saints come to the final game against the Redskins. If they win, Dan and the team go to the Super Bowl, and Dan would never have to worry about money or moving around again. Exhilarated, he and Sara embrace each other at the table and shout jubilantly at each other. This is heard by the children, who use this opportunity to finally confess all to their parents. They try to undo the spell, but fail. They call the babysitter, who translates that the spell will reverse once its purpose is complete: when their parents truly understand each other, they will be restored to their rightful bodies. However, there is a warning clause that implies that unless they manage to undo the spell before the birth of the baby, it will be permanent.

After the babysitter leaves and the Andersons go to bed, Dan and Sara apologize to each other, then kiss, which turns out to be the necessary act of understanding. The next day is the big match, and Dan's teammates instantly notice the difference in his behavior. While Sara goes into labor, his attempts to motivate his teammates with insults causes them to start fumbling. Clark reminds him to forget his old methods of motivation and revert to the "touchy-feely stuff" Sara used. In the hospital, Sara is puffing, panting, swearing, and ordering the nurses to bring her a TV. Around the time Dan wins the championship game, she finally gives in to nature and gives birth to a son. Later on, Dan is offered another job, but turns it down for his family.

== Cast ==
- Vivica A. Fox as Sara Anderson / Dan Anderson
- David Alan Grier as Dan Anderson / Sara Anderson
- Al Waxman as Coach Beasily
- Scott Owen Cumberbatch as Clark Anderson
- Shadia Simmons as Annette Anderson
- David Keeley as Otis
- Rue McClanahan as Aunt Fanny
- Frank Welker as Voltaire (voice)
- Louise Stratten as Kimberly
- Mark Lutz as Morton Wagner
- Scott Wickware as Coach Barker
- John Boylan as Principal Wilby
- Alex Campbell as Billy
- John Jarvis as Dr. Davis
- Don Wilson as Tight End
- Robert Thomas as Offensive Tackle
- Arnold Pinnock as Guy in Convertible
- Rufus Crawford as Referee

== Background ==
The film was dedicated to the memory of Dave Waymer by its story writer and executive producer, Sally Hampton, whose experience as an NFL wife (Hampton and Waymer were married in 1981) was the inspiration behind the story. Hampton said she had loosely based the lead characters on their personalities and, ironically, the lead actor, David Alan Grier and Waymer share the same July 1 birthday and Hampton, was born late afternoon of July 29 making her birthday only hours away from the July 30 birthdays of lead actress, Vivica A. Fox and director Peter Bogdanovich. Adding to these coincidences, principal photography of the film began on June 29, 1998, what would have been the 17th wedding anniversary of Hampton's marriage to Waymer.

The film was originally titled In Your Shoes. Filming took place in Toronto.

== Reception ==
Ray Richmond of Variety gave the film a positive review. Whilst noting plot similarities to Freaky Friday, Trading Places and The Parent Trap, as well as character stereotypes, he stated "there is so much to like about the genuinely canny show that all of the other stuff sounds nitpicky and harsh. Under Bogdanovich's sure hand, this is a stylish fantasy that leaves you with a smile."
