= McClenahan =

McClenahan is a surname. Notable people with the surname include:

- Bessie McClenahan (1885–1969), American sociologist and social worker
- Brian McClenahan (born 1982), American rugby union player
- Catherine McClenahan (born 1959), Canadian actress, singer, host and writer
- Charles A. McClenahan (born 1941), American politician
- Trent McClenahan (born 1985), Australian football (soccer) player

== See also ==
- McClenahan House, a historic house in Pittsboro, Chatham County, North Carolina, United States
- McClenaghan, a surname
