= Anthony Marrone =

American fire chief

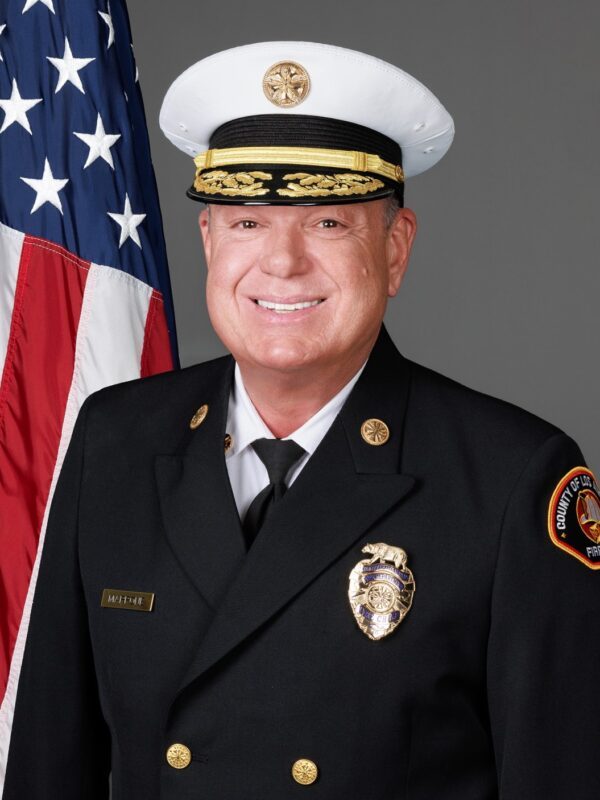
- Marrone in 2023

10th Chief of the Los Angeles County Fire Department
- Incumbent
- Assumed office April 24, 2023; Acting: August 1, 2022 – April 23, 2023
- Preceded by: Daryl Osby

Personal details
- Born: Anthony C. Marrone

Anthony C. Marrone is an American fire chief serving as the tenth chief of the Los Angeles County Fire Department (LACoFD) since April 2023. He previously served as the acting fire chief and he oversaw multiple operational and administrative bureaus.

== Career ==
As of 2022, Marrone has served in the Los Angeles County Fire Department (LACoFD) for over 37 years. He assumed the role of acting fire chief on August 1, 2022, following the retirement of fire chief Daryl L. Osby. His appointment was made by the Los Angeles County Board of Supervisors, and it followed a prior interim role during Osby's leave of absence in 2021.

Marrone's career within the LACoFD includes experience in emergency operations, business operations, and overseeing multiple bureaus. He has led the Leadership and Professional Standards Bureau, Special Services Bureau, Emergency Medical Services Bureau, East Regional Operations Bureau, and Central Regional Operations Bureau. He has also managed wildland fires and other all-risk incidents as part of his operational responsibilities.

On February 28, 2023, the board of supervisors voted unanimously to select Marrone as the department's permanent chief, despite opposition from several organizations. These groups raised concerns about diversity, transparency, and inclusivity in the department's leadership selection process. Marrone was officially sworn in as fire chief on April 24, 2023, becoming the department's tenth chief. As chief, he receives an annual salary of US$441,792 (equivalent to $455,930 in 2024). Upon assuming the position, he committed to advancing diversity and equity within the department and stabilizing its budget to enhance service levels.

During his tenure, Marrone has overseen the department’s response to major wildfires, including the January 2025 Southern California wildfires. These events taxed the resources of the department and highlighted challenges in manpower and resource allocation. Marrone acknowledged the limitations faced by LACoFD and collaborated with other agencies to address the crises.
