= McClenaghan =

McClenaghan is a surname. Notable people with the surname include:

- Kim McClenaghan (born 1974), South African poet and writer
- Mitchell McClenaghan (born 1986), New Zealand cricketer
- Rhys McClenaghan (born 1999), Irish artistic gymnast
- Stewart McClenaghan (1866–1944), Canadian politician

== See also ==
- McClenahan, a surname
