= Whiteman Airport =

General aviation airport in Los Angeles, California

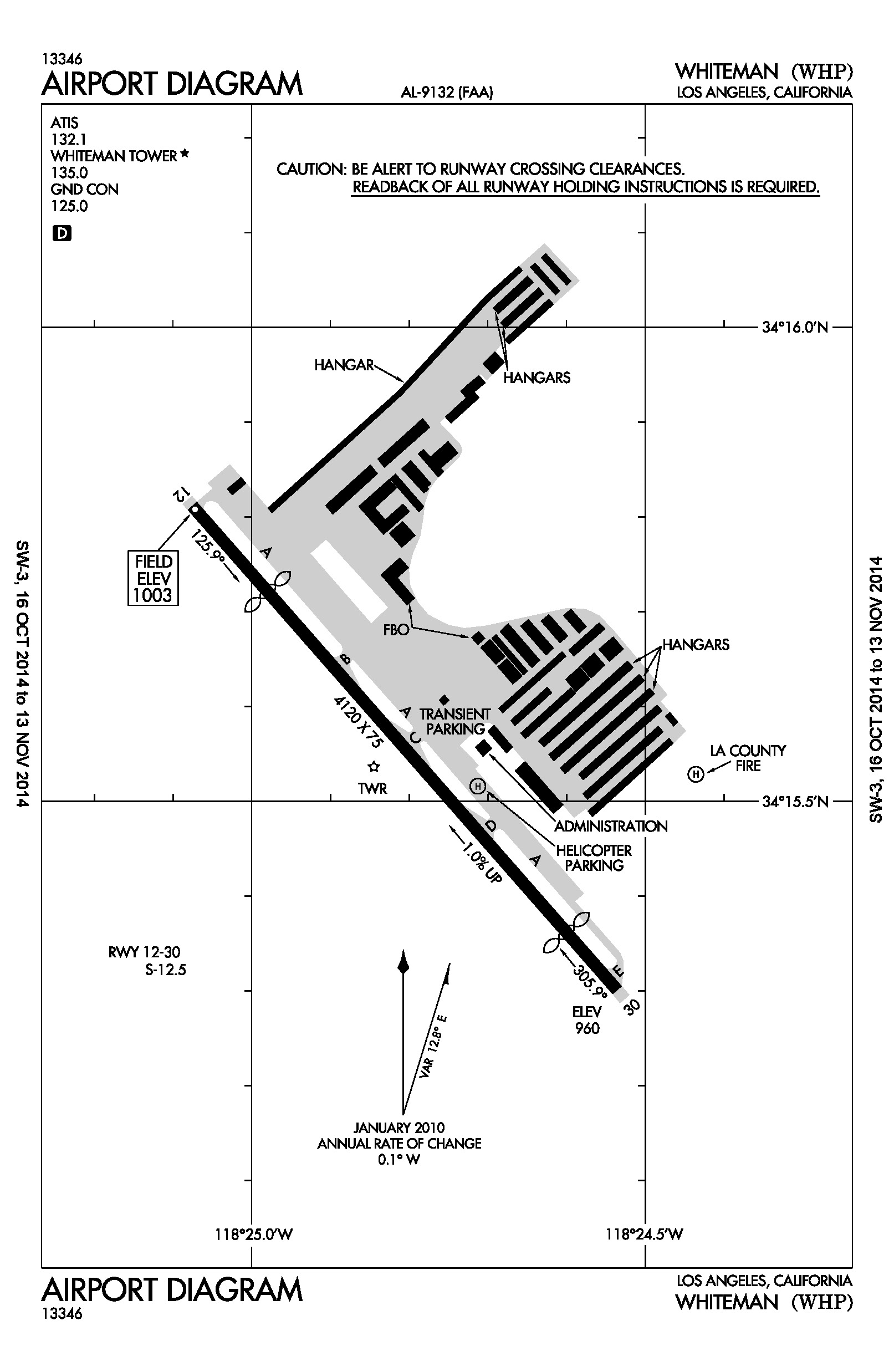
- IATA: WHP; ICAO: KWHP; FAA LID: WHP

Summary
- Airport type: Public
- Operator: Los Angeles County
- Serves: Greater Los Angeles
- Location: Pacoima
- Opened: 1946; 80 years ago
- Elevation AMSL: 305.7 m (1,003 ft)
- Coordinates: 34°15′33.57″N 118°24′48.35″W

Map
- Location within Los Angeles/San Fernando Valley WHP (the Los Angeles metropolitan area) WHP (California)

Runways
Direction	Length		Surface
Direction	m	ft	Surface
12/30	1,256	4,120	Asphalt

Whiteman Airport (IATA: WHP, ICAO: KWHP, FAA LID: WHP) is a general aviation airport in the northeastern San Fernando Valley community of Pacoima, in the city of Los Angeles, California, United States.

The airport was founded as Whiteman Air Park in 1946 on a farm by pilot Marvin Whiteman Sr. as a non-tower controlled, private airport. Later, Whiteman Manufacturing Co. was built on the airport's west side. In 1970, the airport was purchased by the County of Los Angeles. During the 1980s, the name was changed to "Whiteman Airport", but it is still commonly referred to as "Whiteman Airpark" by old-time local pilots.

The airport is open to general aviation aircraft 24 hours a day, seven days a week. It is home to over 600 aircraft, and numerous aviation-related businesses. The airport can handle small aircraft as well as medium turboprops and jets, although little jet traffic is seen on its rather narrow runway. The control tower is operated by Serco (not the FAA) and is in operation daily. The single runway has runway end identifier lights (REILs), pilot controlled medium-intensity runway lighting (MIRLs) and a precision approach path indicator (PAPI). Full- and self-service fuel is available around the clock. The airport has an automated weather observing system (AWOS) with data available continuously by radio and telephone.

== Runway ==
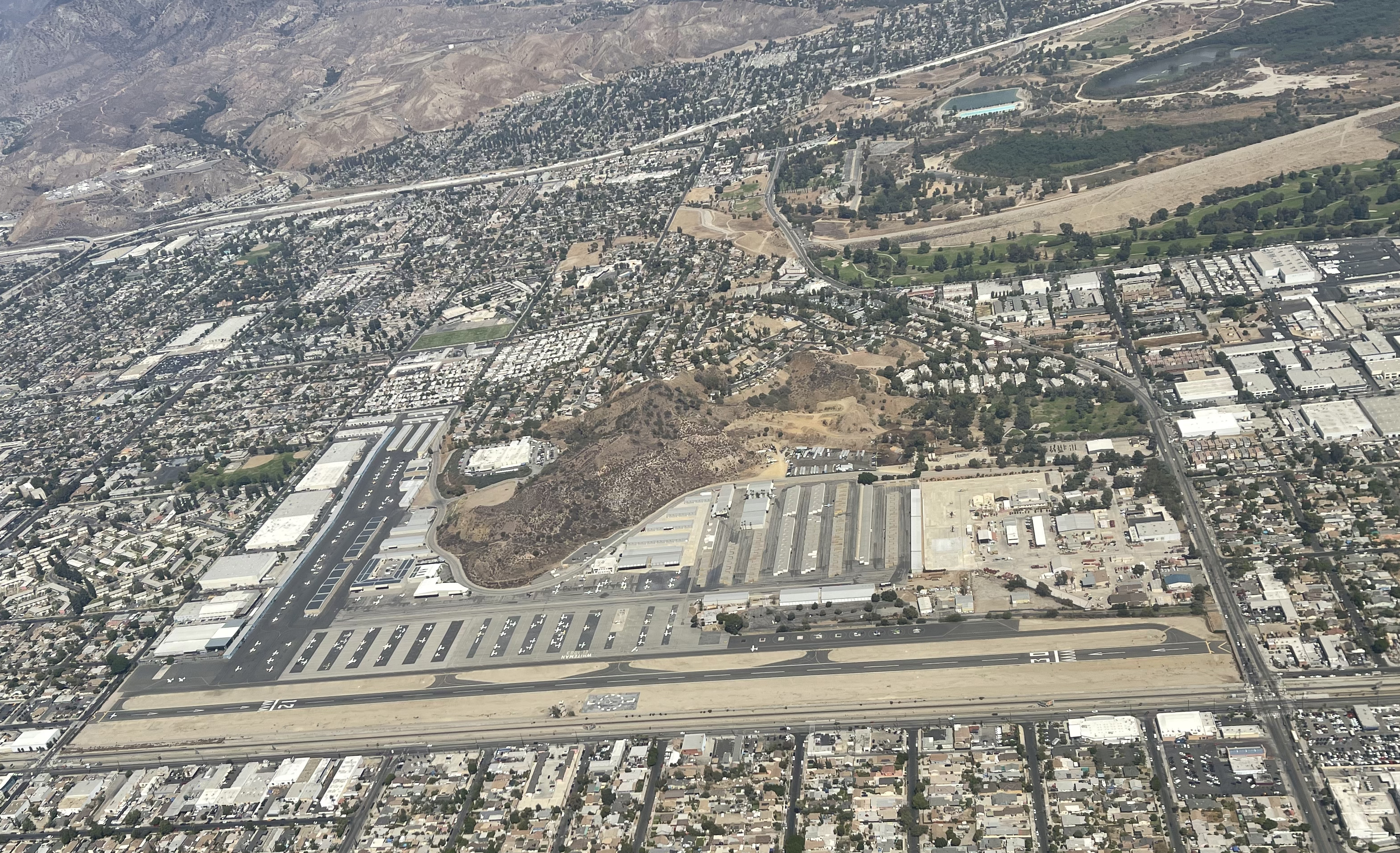
Whiteman Airport (2021)

- Runway 12/30: 4,120 x 75 ft (1,256 x 23 m), surface: asphalt

== Barton Heliport of the LACoFD ==
The Los Angeles County Fire Department Air Operations unit is based at Barton Heliport (KPAI), adjacent to the southeast of this airport.

== Education ==
Whiteman Airport hosts two flight training programs: Vista Air Inc., a privately owned Part 61 flight school, and Glendale Community College’s Part 141 aviation program. Both institutions provide comprehensive instruction, including ground school, real-time flight training, and simulated flight exercises in Cessna aircraft. Student pilots can obtain their Private Pilot License (PPL), Instrument Rating (IR), and Commercial Pilot License (CPL) through these programs. Unfortunately, since the airport does not have an Instrument Landing System (ILS), Van Nuys Airport and Hollywood Burbank Airport are alternative practice areas for these procedures.

== Flying clubs and groups ==
The airport is home to Senior Squadron 35, Cadet Squadron 137, and Los Angeles County Group 1 of the Civil Air Patrol, as well as EAA Chapter 40 and a branch of the Young Eagles. The mission of the EAA Young Eagles Program is to provide a meaningful flight experience – free of charge – in a general aviation aircraft for young people (primarily between the ages of 8 and 17). Flights are provided by EAA members at Whiteman Airport and worldwide.

== Criticism and Possible Closure ==
Safety concerns due to airplane crashes, along with noise pollution concerns due to the widespread use of lead in avgas have led some nearby residents and local politicians to make repeated calls for the facility's closure. As a result, the Los Angeles County Board of Supervisors approved a plan to look at what would be necessary to close the airport, and Representative Tony Cárdenas requested a comprehensive safety review.

Los Angeles councilwoman Monica Rodriguez, Council District 7, joins 501(c)(3) Pacoima Beautiful in seeking Whiteman's closure. No plans or disclosures have been released specifying which entities, public or for-profit, might acquire the land and facilities if closed, nor to what use they might be put.

Other groups, such the Sunland-Tujunga Neighborhood Council, are opposed to closing the airport, citing the many benefits it provides to the community including jobs, youth and outreach programs, and multiple public safety and emergency services based at the airport.

== Accidents and incidents ==
Although there have never been any injuries to people on the ground, there have been multiple incidents involving aircraft based at Whiteman Airport.

- On November 12, 2020, a Cessna plane coming in for a landing at Whiteman Airport crashed into a residential neighborhood in Pacoima after experiencing engine failure. The pilot was killed, and the crash damaged electrical wires, cars, and at least one home.
- On January 9, 2022, a Cessna 172 taking off from Whiteman Airport crashed onto nearby train tracks. Los Angeles Police Department officers were able to extract the pilot from the plane seconds before it was struck by an incoming Metrolink train.
- On April 20, 2022, a pilot was killed when his Cessna Skymaster crashed into Interstate 210 several minutes after departing from Whiteman Airport.
- On April 20, 2026, a Cessna 172S struck a powerline on Van Nuys Boulevard while approaching Runway 12, and landed upside down on a parking lot. The single pilot on board sustained critical injuries.

== See also ==
- List of airports in the Los Angeles area
