= Bessie McClenahan =

American social worker

- McClenahan, from a 1930 newspaper
- Born: August 1, 1885; Des Moines, Iowa, U.S.
- Died: February 22, 1969 (aged 83); Los Angeles, California, U.S.
- Occupations: Social worker, sociologist, college professor

Bessie Averne McClenahan (August 1, 1885 – February 22, 1969) was an American social worker, sociologist, and college professor. She developed basic principles in the field of community organizing.

== Early life and education ==
McClenahan was born in Des Moines, Iowa, the daughter of Commodore J. McClenahan and Rachel Saylor McClenahan. She graduated from Drake University, and earned a master's degree from the University of Iowa, with further studies at the New York School for Philanthropy.

== Career ==
McClenahan inspected charities and conducted survey research while she was assistant secretary of Associated Charities of Des Moines, and later as director of the social welfare department at the University of Iowa. She spoke to women's clubs and community groups on various topics, including "The Social Significance of Play" and "Recreation and the Movies".

In 1913 McClenahan did relief work with the American Red Cross in Dayton, Ohio, after a major flood there. During World War I she worked with the Red Cross again, promoting training programs for home service work. In 1919 and 1920 she was a lecturer at the Missouri School of Social Economy. After a time as director of the Community Council in St. Louis, she became an associate professor of rural sociology at the University of Missouri in 1924.

McClenahan moved to Southern California with her mother in 1926. She was assistant professor of sociology and assistant director of the School of Social Work at the University of Southern California (USC); she also taught sociology at the University of California, Los Angeles (UCLA). She spoke to the Des Moines Council of Social Agencies in 1930, on "Training Girls for Leadership" in Whittier in 1931, and at the Pasadena YWCA in 1935. She taught an adult evening class at USC on "Women in Industry" in 1935, and summer courses at Utah State Agricultural College in 1938. She was active in church work in Los Angeles after World War II. She was president of the Women's Faculty Club at USC in 1950.

In 1933, McClenahan became the third woman admitted to the membership of the International Institute of Sociology in Geneva. She is credited with providing important practical underpinnings to the fields of social welfare and community organizing.

== Publications ==
- The Social Survey (1916)
- The Iowa Plan for the Combination of Public and Private Relief (1918, with Paul Skeels Pierce and Sudhindra Bose)
- Organizing the Community: A Review of Practical Principles (1922)
- The Changing Urban Neighborhood: From Neighbor to Nigh-dweller; a Sociological Study (1929)
- "The Child of the Relief Agency" (1935)
- "The Group Work Field: A Professional Evaluation in Terms of a Summary of Aims, Principles, and Types of Group Work" (1936)
- The Social Workers' Dictionary (1936, co-edited with Erle Fiske Young and Pauline V. Young)
- "Social Causes of Decline of Neighborhoods" (1942)
- "Sociology and Social Planning" (1953)

== Personal life ==
McClenahan lived in Southern California with her mother from 1926 until her mother's death in 1948. She had a new home built for her in "Spanish" or mission style, in the View Park neighborhood. She died in Los Angeles in 1969, at the age of 83.
