= Dave Waymer =

American football player (1958–1993)

No. 43, 44
- Position: Safety

Personal information
- Born: July 1, 1958; Brooklyn, New York, U.S.
- Died: April 30, 1993 (aged 34); Mooresville, North Carolina, U.S.
- Listed height: 6 ft 1 in (1.85 m)
- Listed weight: 195 lb (88 kg)

Career information
- High school: West Charlotte (Charlotte, North Carolina)
- College: Notre Dame
- NFL draft: 1980: 2nd round, 41st overall pick

Career history
- New Orleans Saints (1980–1989); San Francisco 49ers (1990–1991); Los Angeles Raiders (1992)

Awards and highlights
- Second-team All-Pro (1987); Pro Bowl (1987); New Orleans Saints Hall of Fame; National champion (1977)

Career NFL statistics
- Interceptions: 48
- Fumble recoveries: 18
- Sacks: 1
- Stats at Pro Football Reference

David Benjamin Waymer Jr. (July 1, 1958 – April 30, 1993) was an American professional football player who was a safety in the National Football League (NFL).

Waymer graduated from West Charlotte High School in 1976. He played college football for the Notre Dame, graduating in 1980, and was drafted in the 1980 NFL draft in the second round by the New Orleans Saints, where he played until 1989. He was offered a contract by the New Jersey Generals of the United States Football League (USFL), but opted to remain in New Orleans, saying, "I always wanted to play there. I've got a lot of friends there, and that is where, hopefully, I'll finish out my career." He played for the San Francisco 49ers in 1990 and 1991 and the Los Angeles Raiders in 1992.

During the 1993 offseason, Waymer died on April 30, 1993, at the age of 34, from a heart attack induced by cocaine use.

The ABC/Wonderful World of Disney movie A Saintly Switch was dedicated to Waymer's memory in 1999.

On January 24, 2022, the SB Nation Saints blog Canal Street Chronicles featured Waymer in their "LIFE OF A SAINT" series. Family, friends and teammates come together to share their memories of the late Dave Waymer.

== See also ==
- List of gridiron football players who died during their careers
