= Jim E. Mora =

American football coach (born 1935)

Jim Mora
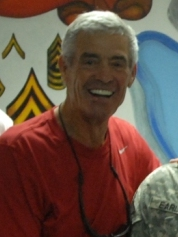
- Mora in 2011

Personal information
- Born: May 24, 1935 (age 91); Glendale, California, U.S.

Career information
- High school: University High School (Los Angeles)
- College: Occidental

Career history
- Occidental (1961–1963) Assistant coach; Occidental (1964–1966) Head coach; Stanford (1967) Linebackers coach; Colorado (1968–1973) Defensive ends, outside linebackers & defensive backs coach; UCLA (1974) Linebackers coach; Washington (1975–1977) Defensive coordinator; Seattle Seahawks (1978–1981) Defensive line coach; New England Patriots (1982) Defensive line coach; Philadelphia/Baltimore Stars (1983–1985) Head coach; New Orleans Saints (1986–1996) Head coach; Indianapolis Colts (1998–2001) Head coach

Awards and highlights
- 2× USFL champion (1984, 1985); NFL Coach of the Year (1987); New Orleans Saints Hall of Fame

Head coaching record
- Regular season: NFL: 125–106 (.541); USFL: 41–12–1 (.769); College: 18–9 (.667)
- Postseason: NFL: 0–6 (.000); USFL: 7–1 (.875)
- Career: NFL: 125–112 (.527); USFL: 48–13–1 (.782); College: 18–9 (.667)
- Coaching profile at Pro Football Reference

James Ernest Mora (born May 24, 1935) is an American former football coach who served as a head coach in the National Football League (NFL) for 15 seasons. He was the head coach of the New Orleans Saints from 1986 to 1996 and the Indianapolis Colts from 1998 to 2001. Mora was also the head coach of the Philadelphia/Baltimore Stars of the first iteration of the United States Football League (USFL) during its three years of existence and led the team to all three championship games, winning two.

As an NFL head coach, Mora was known for turning the Saints and Colts, two consistently losing franchises, into perennial postseason contenders. He became the first coach to lead the Saints to a winning record and playoff berth in 1987, their 21st season, earning him NFL Coach of the Year honors. However, his reputation was affected by going winless in the NFL postseason, in addition to impassioned postgame tirades and press conferences. Mora finished his career with a winning percentage of .527, the highest of NFL coaches without a playoff win. He is the father of former NFL and current collegiate head coach Jim L. Mora.

== Early life ==
Born in Glendale, California, Mora became an Eagle Scout in 1950 and was presented the Distinguished Eagle Scout Award as an adult by the Boy Scouts of America. Mora was an all-league end at University High School in Los Angeles and played tight end at Occidental College, where he was a member of the Alpha Tau Omega fraternity, and graduated in 1957. His college roommate was Jack Kemp, an all star quarterback with the Buffalo Bills, U.S congressman from New York for 18 years and presidential candidate in 1988. Another teammate was Ron Botchan, who went on to become a successful NFL game official.

== Coaching career ==
=== Early jobs ===
Mora became an assistant coach at his alma mater in 1960. He moved up to head coach of Occidental in 1964 and led the team for three seasons, compiling an 18–9 record.

Mora received a master's degree in education in 1967 and left Occidental to serve as an assistant coach at Stanford under John Ralston for the 1967 season. He then spent five seasons at Colorado under Eddie Crowder coaching defensive ends, outside linebackers, and defensive backs, one at UCLA under Dick Vermeil, and three at Washington under Don James. He moved across town to the professional ranks in 1978 as the defensive line coach for the NFL's Seattle Seahawks under head coach Jack Patera. After four seasons, Mora moved to the New England Patriots in 1982 under head coach Ron Meyer.

=== USFL ===
The United States Football League came into existence 1983 and Mora became head coach of the Philadelphia Stars (who moved to Baltimore in 1985). During his tenure the team compiled a 48–13–1 (.782) record, appeared in all three USFL championship games and won two of them. Mora was named Coach of the Year in 1984 and is considered by many observers to be the best coach in the short history of the USFL. Six months after the Stars won the 1985 USFL title, Mora was named head coach of the NFL's New Orleans Saints. The USFL was later forced out of business after winning a token award of $3 in an antitrust suit against the NFL.

=== New Orleans Saints ===
Mora was hired by new Saints general manager Jim Finks to turn around what had long been reckoned as the most inept franchise in the NFL. The Saints had won only 90 games in their first nineteen seasons, never tallied a winning record, and only twice had reached .500, in 1979 (the only time they finished higher than 3rd in their division) and 1983. Mora spent his first off-season remaking the Saints roster. He convinced several players from the USFL, including some from his Stars, to come to New Orleans. The imports included linebackers Sam Mills and Vaughan Johnson, who went on to form the inside tandem of the legendary "Dome Patrol" linebacking corps with veteran Rickey Jackson and draftee Pat Swilling on the outside. Mora inherited quarterback Bobby Hebert and receiver Eric Martin from Phillips, and drafted running back Reuben Mayes and tackle Jim Dombrowski.

After a 7–9 record his first season, Mora led the Saints to a 12–3 record in 1987. In week 6 of the 1987 season the Saints lost a 24–22 game to the San Francisco 49ers, with Morten Andersen missing a last-second field goal. After the game Mora launched what became known as his "Coulda, Woulda, Shoulda" speech. In his postgame press conference, Mora angrily said the following:

"They're better than we are; we're not good enough. We shouldn't be thinking about beating these 49ers; we shouldn't be talking about it, 'cause the Saints ain't good enough. And you guys shouldn't write about us being a playoff team and all that bullstuff—that's malarkey. We ain't good enough to beat those guys and it was proven out there today. It's that simple. We're not good enough yet. We've got a long way to go; we've got a lot of work to do; we're close, and close don't mean shit. And you can put that on TV for me. I'm tired of coming close, and we're gonna work our asses off until we ain't close anymore, and it may take some time; we're gonna get it done; we aren't in there—we aren't good enough. They're better than us—black and white, simple, fact!

"Could've, would've, should've" is the difference in what I'm talking about! The good teams don't come in and say "Could've." They get it done! All right? It's that simple! I'm tired of saying "Could've, should've, would've." That's why we ain't good enough yet! 'Cause we're saying "Could've" and they ain't!

I'm pissed off right now. You bet your ass I am. I'm sick of coulda, woulda, shoulda, coming close, if only."

The Saints responded by winning their last nine games, notching the franchise's first-ever winning record and playoff berth. The Saints had the second-best record in the entire league. Unfortunately for them, the 49ers had the league's best record (13–2), and also played in the NFC West. Therefore, the Saints were a wild-card team (since 1987 was a strike-shortened season with replacement games, the Saints and 49ers had identical 10–2 records in regular season non-replacement games). Nonetheless, the Saints were able to play their first playoff game at home, which they lost, 44–10, to the Minnesota Vikings. Mora received the NFL Coach of the Year Award.

Mora's Saints finished 10–6 in 1988, and were part of a three-way tie for first in the NFC West with the San Francisco 49ers and Los Angeles Rams. However, the 49ers won the division on tie-breakers with a season sweep of the Saints, and the Saints lost the wild-card tiebreaker with the Rams and missed the playoffs. In 1989, the Saints again had a winning record (9–7) but finished 3rd in the NFC West and missed the playoffs. It was during the 1989 season when Mora had another remembered tirade after a game, when he scolded a sportswriter on not knowing what goes on during the week during practice.

You guys really don't know when it's good or bad, when it comes right down to it. ... And I'm promising you right now, you don't know whether it's good or bad. You really don't know, because you don't know what we're trying to do, you guys don't look at the films, you don't know what happened, you really don't know. You think you know, but you DON'T-KNOW, and you never WILL, okay?

Thereafter his Saints teams made the playoffs three more times. In 1990, the Saints only finished 8–8, but managed to make the playoffs as a wild card. They lost in the first round of the playoffs to the Chicago Bears, 16–6.

In 1991, Mora's Saints finished 11–5 and won the team's first division title. However, the Saints lost again in the first round of the playoffs. They lost at home to the Atlanta Falcons 27–20, in spite of finishing one game ahead of the Falcons in the NFC West during the regular season. In 1992, Mora led the Saints to its second 12-win season in six seasons, finishing 12–4. They were a wild card again, however, as the San Francisco 49ers finished 14–2. For the second time in two years, the Saints were upset at home in the first round of the playoffs, as the Philadelphia Eagles defeated the Saints 36–20. This would be the Saints' last playoff game during Mora's tenure, leaving him with an 0–4 playoff record in New Orleans. The Saints would not win a playoff game until 2000.

(Following a 33–3 exhibition loss to the Houston Oilers in 1992 marred by poor kick returns) "I'm sure people vomited in the stands after watching our kicking game. I'm sure they vomited in the stands. That was just horrible, embarrassing. Was that on national television? (told it was blacked out locally) Thank God."

1993 marked the beginning of the decline of Mora's Saints. The team started the season 5–0 and appeared to be headed to the postseason again; however, after the Saints' bye week, the team went into a tailspin and went only 3–8 in the final 11 games, including losing four out of their last five. 1993 was Mora's last season of .500 or better in New Orleans. In the Week 16 game at home against the New York Giants, Saints quarterback Wade Wilson was injured on Monday Night Football and fans were cheering that fact, prompting an angry retort:

"You know, I'd like to begin my remarks by saying this, and I mean this in all sincerity; I've been coaching for 34 years, and tonight I saw and heard one of the most disgusting, rudest, sick, demonstrations in my entire career. Probably the worst. When Wade Wilson got hurt, I actually looked up into the stands and saw people standing, clapping, and cheering when he was laying [sic] on the ground with a knee injury. And I say this, those are some sick, sick, sick people! Mentally sick! I thought it was horrible, disgusting, embarrassing, shameful, it stunk! People are sick when they do something like that; absolutely friggin' sick! Guy's out there busting his ass like all of our guys were, gets his knee blown up, not badly hopefully, and they're standing and cheering and clapping! Those are sick people! Sick in the head! They oughta get their ass thrown right out of the stadium!"

After two 7–9 seasons in 1994 and 1995, Mora appeared increasingly frustrated with his team's situation in New Orleans. The Saints' defense went into a steep decline, negating the passing heroics of quarterback Jim Everett, acquired from the division rival Los Angeles Rams in 1994 for a seventh-round draft choice. Everett came to the Saints shortly before his infamous incident with Jim Rome on ESPN2 when Rome insulted the quarterback by calling him Chris Evert, a reference to Jim Everett's lack of toughness.

The 1996 season started off very badly. The Saints lost their first five games, including an embarrassing 28–14 loss at home to the then-winless Arizona Cardinals in which LeShon Johnson rushed for 214 yards, a Cardinals franchise record which has since been broken by Beanie Wells in 2011. Following a road loss to the Baltimore Ravens, the Saints won back-to-back home games vs. the Jacksonville Jaguars and Chicago Bears, but the turnaround was a mirage. After the Saints were beaten 19–7 by the Carolina Panthers on October 20, a loss which put them at 2–6 midway through the season, Mora walked out of the postgame press conference in disgust after a profanity-laced tirade. His outburst became famous on sports highlight reels for years to follow, largely because of Mora's use of the phrase "Diddly Poo." On the Saints' performance, Mora said the following:

"Well, what happened was, that second game we got our ass kicked. Errr—the second half, we just got our ass totally kicked. We couldn't do diddly ... poo offensively. We couldn't make a first down. We couldn't run the ball; we didn't try to run the ball. We couldn't complete a pass—we sucked. The second half, we sucked. We couldn't stop the run. Every time they got the ball, they went down and got points. We got our ass totally kicked in the second half—that's what it boiled down to. It was a horseshit performance in the second half. Horseshit. I'm totally embarrassed and totally ashamed. Coaching ... [all] ... [unintelligible] ... Coaching did a horrible job. The players did a horrible job. We got our ass kicked in that second half. It sucked. It stunk. That's as simple as I can tell you."

The next day, Mora resigned; linebackers coach Rick Venturi finished out the season. The Saints finished the season at 3–13, their worst season since going 1–15 in 1980. Venturi was replaced by veteran Chicago Bears coach Mike Ditka. Mora's 93 wins in just over ten years in New Orleans are three more than the Saints had won in their first 19 seasons combined. He won more games than any other coach in Saints history until Sean Payton surpassed his record in 2016.

=== Indianapolis Colts ===
Mora served as a color analyst for NBC in 1997, and he replaced Lindy Infante as head coach of the Indianapolis Colts for 1998. The team struggled to a 3–13 mark in his first year with rookie Peyton Manning learning the ropes at quarterback but had an amazing turnaround to 13–3 in 1999, thanks in large part to the addition of rookie running back Edgerrin James. At the time, this turnaround was the "largest" in NFL history. The Colts lost their first playoff game in the AFC Divisional Playoffs (the team received a first-round bye to advance to the Divisional Playoffs) to the Tennessee Titans, which dropped Mora's all-time NFL postseason record to 0–5.

The Colts finished 10–6 in 2000 and made the playoffs once again, but the team lost a wild-card round playoff game to the Miami Dolphins by a score of 23–17 in overtime. This defeat dropped Mora's overall postseason record to 0–6. Just hours after Mora lost what would be the sixth and final playoff game of his career, his former team, the New Orleans Saints, won their first-ever playoff game.

==== "Playoffs?" tirade ====
On November 25, 2001, after a lackluster five turnover plagued loss to the San Francisco 49ers that dropped the Colts to 4–6, Mora made his famous "playoffs?" tirade. Of the Colts' performance, Mora told the media not to "blame that game on the defense.” Mora cited the five turnovers the Colts' offense made (one of which resulted in a touchdown and three others that set up field position for touchdown-scoring drives) as a cause of the loss, saying that a team that turns the ball over five times in one game is unlikely to beat a high school or college team, "much less an NFL team.”

Later in the press conference, in response to Tim Bragg, a reporter for WRTV, who asked a question about the Colts' chances for making the playoffs, Mora said in a high-pitched, incredulous tone:

"Playoffs? Don't talk about—playoffs?! You kidding me? Playoffs?! I just hope we can win a game! Another game!"

Hampered by a defense that allowed the most points in the league (30.4 per game), Indianapolis only won two more games that year. Some sources believed that Mora could have saved his job if he had fired one (or more) of his coordinators (especially defensive coordinator Vic Fangio), but he refused to do so. Mora was fired after the season and replaced with ex-Buccaneers coach Tony Dungy. Dungy, who served as head coach of the Colts from 2002–2008, made the playoffs in all of his seven seasons with Indianapolis. Along the way, he would lead the team to five straight division titles (2003–07) and a Super Bowl victory (2006).

=== Coaching philosophy ===
Mora favored a conservative approach to the game, relying on a strong running game and solid defensive play. Perhaps more than any other teams, the Saints teams of the late 1980s embodied his coaching style. Those teams were led by the "Dome Patrol" linebacking corps. This unit, consisting of Rickey Jackson, Sam Mills, Vaughan Johnson, and Pat Swilling, became known as one of the best four-man linebacking corps in NFL history. Those same Saints teams also had a strong running game, mostly led by Rueben Mayes and Dalton Hilliard, as well as a conservative but efficient passing game led by quarterback Bobby Hebert and wide receiver Eric Martin. During his time as the Colts' head coach, Mora was able to benefit from having an explosive, more potent offense, featuring quarterback Peyton Manning, running back Edgerrin James, and wide receiver Marvin Harrison. Manning, James, and Harrison have all earned induction into the Pro Football Hall of Fame.

In Mora's 11 seasons with the Saints, he won 55.6% of his games for a team that had never recorded a winning record prior to his arrival. And during his four seasons with the Colts, he built a then-struggling team into a respectable playoff contender. Despite his overall solid regular season record coaching both the Saints and Colts (125–106), the biggest criticism of Mora has been his teams' inability to win any playoff games in six appearances. His critics, both among fans and media reporters, often blamed his lack of success in the postseason to his conservative approach.

Critics continued to argue that this conservative approach prevented his teams from closing out big games against good teams, like the Marty Ball approach Marty Schottenheimer used during his coaching career. The most frequent complaint was that his teams' offenses would no longer be aggressive late in these football games. They accused him of trying to run out the clock and not make mistakes and over-relying on his defense to hold the lead (instead of trying to build on the lead and score more points). Critics argued that this aspect of his conservative strategy backfired on him. They point to the fact that his teams had second half leads in four of his six playoff games, but they won none of them. In three of those games, Mora's teams had leads in the fourth quarter.

Another factor that worked against Mora during his coaching career with the Saints was how his team played in the NFC West with the San Francisco 49ers during their dynasty era and earlier in his tenure a strong LA Rams outfit. Twice his Saints team recorded twelve wins without winning the division. Another time, his Saints went 10–6 and still missed the playoffs.

In an NFL Network program naming Jim Mora the #10 "Coach Who Never Won a Championship," former Philadelphia Eagles offensive lineman Brian Baldinger said of the Saints' playoff loss to the Eagles in 1992, "We beat 'em. But that's only because they called the dogs off. Whatever reason, they called the dogs off in the second half. I don't know what Jim Mora was thinking about that day." In that game, the Saints led 17–7 at halftime and 20–10 after the 3rd quarter. However, the Eagles scored 26 unanswered points in the fourth quarter and won the game 36–20.

== Head coaching record ==
=== College ===
Year	Team	Overall	Conference	Standing	Bowl/playoffs
Occidental Tigers (Southern California Intercollegiate Athletic Conference) (1964–1966)
1964	Occidental	5–4	3–2	3rd	
1965	Occidental	8–1	5–0	1st	
1966	Occidental	5–4	3–2	4th	
Occidental:		18–9	11–4		
Total:		18–9			
National championship Conference title Conference division title or championship game berth

=== USFL ===
Team	Year	Regular Season					Postseason			
Team	Year	Won	Lost	Ties	Win %	Finish	Won	Lost	Win %	Result
PHI	1983	15	3	0	.833	1st in Atlantic Div.	1	1	.500	Lost to Michigan Panthers in USFL Championship Game
PHI	1984	16	2	0	.889	1st in Atlantic Div.	3	0	1.000	USFL Champions
BAL	1985	10	7	1	.583	4th in Eastern Con.	3	0	1.000	USFL Champions
Total		41	12	1	.648		7	1	.875	

=== NFL ===
Team	Year	Regular season					Postseason			
Team	Year	Won	Lost	Ties	Win %	Finish	Won	Lost	Win %	Result
NO	1986	7	9	0	.438	4th in NFC West	—	—	—	—
NO	1987	12	3	0	.800	2nd in NFC West	0	1	.000	Lost to Minnesota Vikings in NFC wild card game
NO	1988	10	6	0	.625	3rd in NFC West	—	—	—	—
NO	1989	9	7	0	.563	3rd in NFC West	—	—	—	—
NO	1990	8	8	0	.500	2nd in NFC West	0	1	.000	Lost to Chicago Bears in NFC Wild Card Game
NO	1991	11	5	0	.688	1st in NFC West	0	1	.000	Lost to Atlanta Falcons in NFC Wild Card Game
NO	1992	12	4	0	.750	2nd in NFC West	0	1	.000	Lost to Philadelphia Eagles in NFC Wild Card Game
NO	1993	8	8	0	.500	2nd in NFC West	—	—	—	—
NO	1994	7	9	0	.438	2nd in NFC West	—	—	—	—
NO	1995	7	9	0	.438	5th in NFC West	—	—	—	—
NO	1996	2	6	0	.250	(resigned)	—	—	—	—
NO total		93	74	0	.557		0	4	.000	
IND	1998	3	13	0	.188	5th in AFC East	—	—	—	—
IND	1999	13	3	0	.813	1st in AFC East	0	1	.000	Lost to Tennessee Titans in AFC Divisional Game
IND	2000	10	6	0	.625	2nd in AFC East	0	1	.000	Lost to Miami Dolphins in AFC Wild Card Game
IND	2001	6	10	0	.375	4th in AFC East	—	—	—	—
IND total		32	32	0	.500		0	2	.000	
Total		125	106	0	.541		0	6	.000	

== Life after coaching ==
In 2003, Mora became an on-air analyst for NFL Total Access, the primary analysis show on the newly launched NFL Network.

Mora was a sports radio commentator for Fox Sports Radio's GameTime Saturday and GameTime Sunday with Dan Moriarty. On Thanksgiving Thursday, November 23, 2006, Mora made some critical comments about the Atlanta Falcons' quarterback Michael Vick which became controversial because the Falcons were coached at the time by Mora's son, Jim L. Mora. Craig Shemon of Fox Sports Radio called Vick a "coach killer" and Mora quickly agreed with that assessment, saying that Vick was not a good passer and expressing concern for his son's prospects of keeping his head coaching job while the popular Vick was the team's quarterback (The younger Mora was indeed fired a month later).

== See also ==
- List of National Football League head coaches with 50 wins
