= Vic Fangio =

American football coach (born 1958)

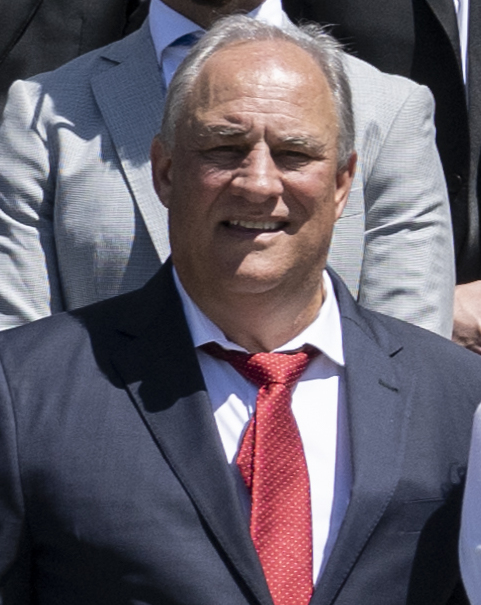
- Fangio in 2025

Philadelphia Eagles
- Title: Defensive coordinator

Personal information
- Born: August 22, 1958 (age 68); Dunmore, Pennsylvania, U.S.

Career information
- High school: Dunmore (PA)
- College: East Stroudsburg (1976–1980)

Career history
- Dunmore HS (PA) (1979) Linebackers coach; Dunmore HS (PA) (1980–1981) Defensive coordinator; Milford Academy (CT) (1982) Defensive coordinator; North Carolina (1983) Graduate assistant; Philadelphia / Baltimore Stars (1984–1985) Defensive assistant; New Orleans Saints (1986–1994) Linebackers coach; Carolina Panthers (1995–1998) Defensive coordinator; Indianapolis Colts (1999–2001) Defensive coordinator; Houston Texans (2002–2005) Defensive coordinator; Baltimore Ravens (2006–2008) Special assistant to head coach/Defensive assistant; Baltimore Ravens (2009) Linebackers coach; Stanford (2010) Defensive coordinator; San Francisco 49ers (2011–2014) Defensive coordinator; Chicago Bears (2015–2018) Defensive coordinator; Denver Broncos (2019–2021) Head coach; Philadelphia Eagles (2022) Consultant; Miami Dolphins (2023) Defensive coordinator; Philadelphia Eagles (2024–present) Defensive coordinator

Awards and highlights
- Super Bowl champion (LIX); AP NFL Assistant Coach of the Year (2018); 2× USFL champion (1984, 1985)

Head coaching record
- Regular season: 19–30 (.388)
- Coaching profile at Pro Football Reference

Victor John Fangio (born August 22, 1958) is an American professional football coach who is the defensive coordinator for the Philadelphia Eagles of the National Football League (NFL). A 41-year coaching veteran with 33 seasons of NFL experience, he has been the defensive coordinator for the Chicago Bears, San Francisco 49ers, Stanford University, Houston Texans, Indianapolis Colts, and Carolina Panthers as well as the head coach of the Denver Broncos.

Fangio's defenses have consistently been among the most productive in the NFL in a number of categories, including scoring defense, total yards allowed and fewest penalties. His defenses have ranked in the league's top-five in yards allowed in eight of the last 13 years while placing in the NFL's top five in fewest points allowed seven times over that span.

== Coaching career ==
=== Early career ===
In 1975, Fangio played the defensive position of safety at Dunmore High School, outside of Scranton, Pennsylvania. While he did not play college football, Fangio took several coaching classes during his time as an undergraduate student at East Stroudsburg University. Fangio graduated in 1980 with a bachelor's degree in health and physical education.

From 1979 to 1981, Fangio returned to his high school as the linebackers coach and defensive coordinator. In 1982, Fangio was the defensive coordinator at Milford Academy, and he became a defensive assistant coach for the Philadelphia / Baltimore Stars of the United States Football League (USFL) two years later.

=== New Orleans Saints ===
Fangio began his NFL career with the New Orleans Saints as the team's linebackers coach from 1986 to 1994, going along with the head coach he worked for in the USFL, Jim Mora. He was the position coach for the famed "Dome Patrol", one of the greatest linebacker corps of all time, which consisted of middle linebackers Sam Mills and Vaughan Johnson along with outside linebackers Rickey Jackson and Pat Swilling, who collectively under Fangio garnered 10 All-Pro selections and 15 Pro Bowl nods. During Fangio's nine seasons in New Orleans, the Saints ranked among the NFL's top five in total defense (300.0 ypg – 5th), scoring defense (18.1 ppg – 4th), sacks (408 – 3rd) and takeaways (336 – T-3rd).

=== Carolina Panthers ===
Fangio joined the Carolina Panthers in 1995, the inaugural season for the Panthers. He was the defensive coordinator from 1995 to 1998 under head coach Dom Capers and helped the franchise advance to the NFC Championship Game in just its second season.

=== Indianapolis Colts ===
Fangio reunited with head coach Jim Mora and coached the defense for the Colts from 1999 to 2001.

=== Houston Texans ===
Fangio joined another first-year team in the Houston Texans in 2002. Again working under Dom Capers, he was defensive coordinator in Houston from 2002 to 2005.

=== Baltimore Ravens ===
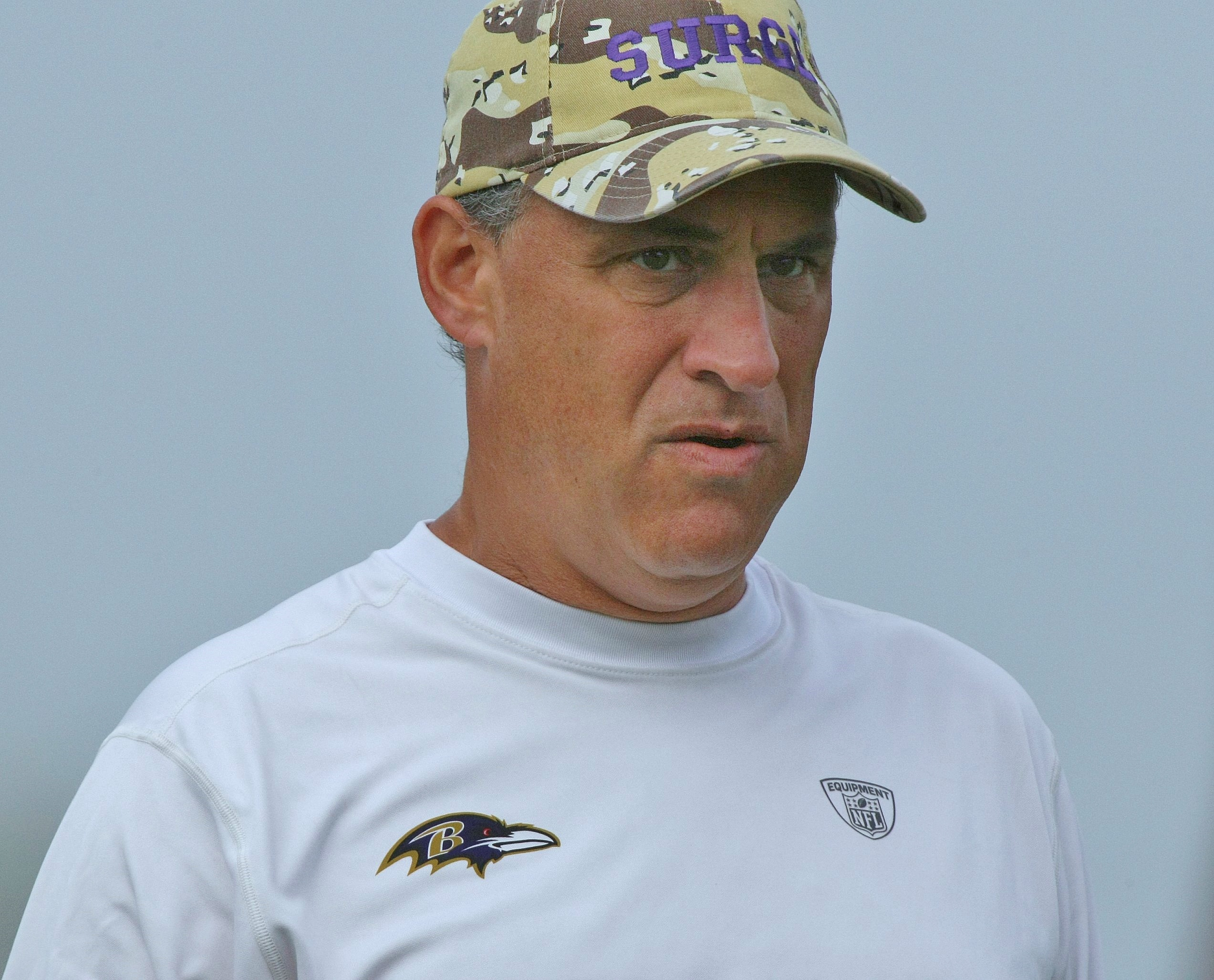
Fangio in 2009

Fangio joined the Baltimore Ravens in 2006 and worked as a special assistant to the head coach/defensive assistant for his first three years with the Ravens and later coached a linebackers group in 2009 that featured All-Pro Ray Lewis.

=== Stanford ===
In 2010, Fangio was the defensive coordinator for the Stanford Cardinal under head coach Jim Harbaugh.

=== San Francisco 49ers ===
In 2011, Fangio followed Harbaugh to the San Francisco 49ers when Harbaugh was hired as the 49ers' head coach. As defensive coordinator, Fangio was credited with turning around the 49ers defense, producing a league-high 35 turnovers in 2011. Fangio was released from his contract by the 49ers on January 15, 2015, after Harbaugh was let go.

=== Chicago Bears ===
On January 19, 2015, Fangio agreed in principle to become the defensive coordinator for the Chicago Bears. After the departure of outside linebackers coach Clint Hurtt in 2017, Fangio assumed that position in addition to his role as defensive coordinator. During Fangio's first three seasons in Chicago, the Bears defense improved from a 30th-ranked unit in 2014 to being 14th, 15th, and 10th in total defense.

Fangio's contract expired following the 2017 season and he interviewed for the Bears' head coaching position on January 3, 2018. The head coaching position ultimately went to Matt Nagy. Nine days later, Fangio signed a three-year extension with the Bears to continue as their defensive coordinator, making him the first Bears defensive coordinator to stay under a new head coach since Buddy Ryan with newly arriving head Mike Ditka in 1982. Fangio was also granted complete control of the defense. Under Fangio, the 2018 Bears defense excelled as it led the NFL in turnovers forced (36) and interceptions (27). Chicago was also ranked third in total defense, second in yards per play allowed, and first in scoring defense. On January 17, 2019, Fangio was named Assistant Coach of the Year by the Pro Football Writers Association. A month later, he received the same honor from the Associated Press at the 8th NFL Honors.

=== Denver Broncos ===
On January 10, 2019, Fangio was hired to become the 17th head coach of the Denver Broncos.

==== 2019 season ====
As Fangio assembled his staff, defensive backs coach Ed Donatell followed him from the Bears to serve as his defensive coordinator, as did outside linebackers coach Brandon Staley for the same position. On September 9, 2019, Fangio lost his regular season head coaching debut against the Oakland Raiders by a score of 24–16. During Week 5, Fangio recorded his first career win as head coach in a 20–13 victory over the Los Angeles Chargers. In Fangio's first season as head coach, he led the Broncos to a 7–9 record, finishing second in the AFC West.

==== 2020 season ====
In Fangio's second season as head coach, the Broncos lost their star defensive player in Von Miller for the season, due to injury. The Broncos began the 2020 season with a 16–14 loss to the Tennessee Titans on September 14, 2020. On September 21, 2020, Fangio was fined US$100,000 by the NFL for not properly wearing a face mask, as required for coaches during the COVID-19 pandemic, during a Week 2 game. On November 28, 2020, Broncos' backup quarterback Jeff Driskel had tested positive for COVID-19, and starting quarterback Drew Lock, as well as third and fourth quarterbacks Brett Rypien and Blake Bortles, had been in physical contact with Driskel without wearing protective masks. Accordingly, all four were placed in league-mandated quarantine and were deemed ineligible to play in the Week 12 game against the New Orleans Saints on November 29, 2020. Undrafted wide receiver Kendall Hinton, who played quarterback at Wake Forest and was promoted from the practice squad, served as the emergency starter, with running back Royce Freeman as the backup. The Broncos would go on to lose against the Saints by a score of 31–3. Lock, Rypien and Bortles were activated from the Reserve/COVID-19 list on December 1, 2020, and returned to the active roster in preparation for the team's Week 13 game at the Kansas City Chiefs, while Driskel returned to the active roster on December 16, 2020. On December 2, 2020, Fangio announced that the team had fined all four of its quarterbacks for violating COVID-19 protocols and not wearing masks while in close contact of each other. In his second season, Fangio led the Broncos to a 5–11 record, finishing fourth in the AFC West.

==== 2021 season ====
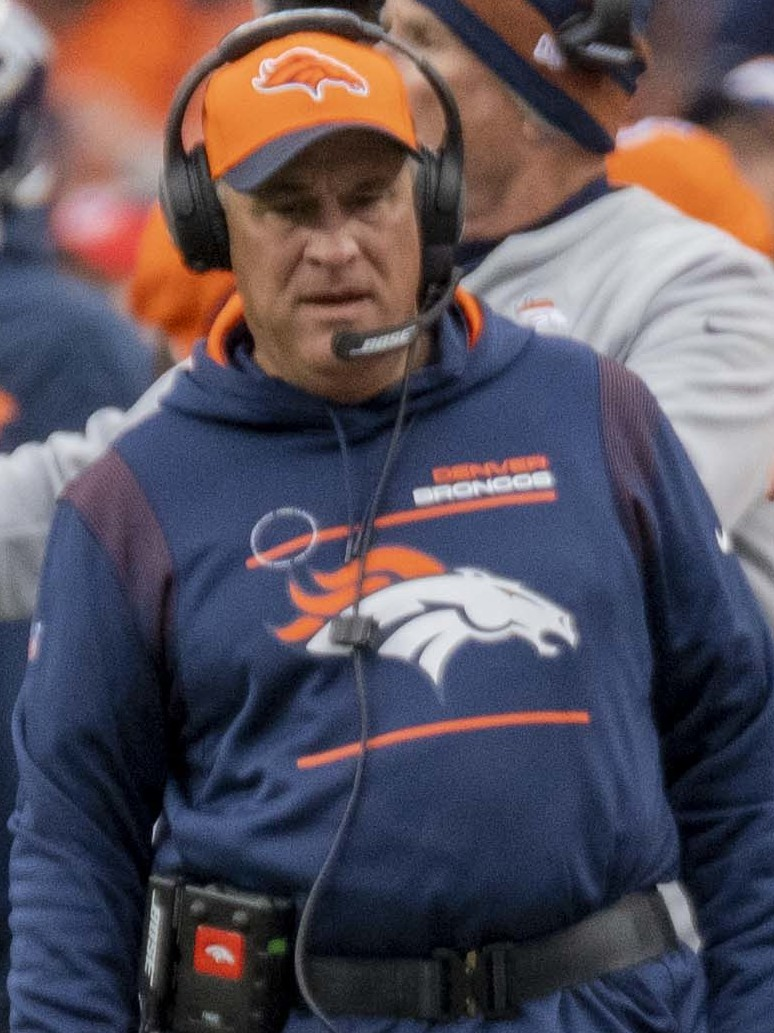
Fangio in 2021

Fangio led the Broncos to a 3–0 start before going 4–10 the rest of the way. After the Broncos lost to the Kansas City Chiefs in the regular season finale, the Broncos parted ways with him. Fangio finished his tenure with the Broncos with a 19–30 (.388) record in three seasons.

On February 12, 2022, following his departure from Denver, Fangio announced that he would not coach with a team during the 2022 season.

=== Philadelphia Eagles ===
Fangio was spotted at a few practices that the Philadelphia Eagles had during their 2022 training camp. On October 10, 2022, news broke that the Eagles had hired him to serve as a consultant. Fangio had been serving in the role for the season, but the team managed to keep the news quiet. He signed a two-week long contract to help with the Eagles' preparation for Super Bowl LVII against the Kansas City Chiefs, which they lost 38–35.

=== Miami Dolphins ===
Following Super Bowl LVII, Eagles defensive coordinator Jonathan Gannon was expected to depart the team to accept a head coaching position, and Fangio was seen as a likely candidate to replace Gannon. However, before Gannon officially left the Eagles to become the head coach of the Arizona Cardinals, Fangio accepted an offer to become the new defensive coordinator for the Miami Dolphins. He was officially hired by the team on February 15, 2023.

On January 24, 2024, Fangio and the Dolphins mutually agreed to part ways, allowing Fangio to be closer to his family in Pennsylvania.

=== Philadelphia Eagles (second stint) ===
On January 27, 2024, Fangio returned to the Eagles to be their defensive coordinator. He replaced Sean Desai, who had served as a defensive assistant under Fangio during his tenure as defensive coordinator for the Bears. The Eagles ranked first in total defense and second in scoring defense, improving from 26th and 30th in those categories the previous season. Fangio finished fourth in voting for the season's Assistant Coach of the Year Award. The Eagles went on to win Super Bowl LIX against the Kansas City Chiefs, and Fangio's defensive unit was widely credited in overwhelming the Chiefs' offense, sacking quarterback Patrick Mahomes six times and forcing three turnovers.

While the defense regressed into the 2025 season, Fangio's unit still allowed the lowest completion percentage, fewest passing touchdowns and second lowest passer rating in the NFL. Despite that, the Eagles were unable to defend their Super Bowl title as they were upset in the Wild Card Round by the San Francisco 49ers, ending their repeat bid.

== Head coaching record ==
Team	Year	Regular season					Postseason			
Team	Year	Won	Lost	Ties	Win %	Finish	Won	Lost	Win %	Result
DEN	2019	7	9	0	.438	2nd in AFC West	—	—	—	—
DEN	2020	5	11	0	.313	4th in AFC West	—	—	—	—
DEN	2021	7	10	0	.412	4th in AFC West	—	—	—	—
Total		19	30	0	.388		0	0	.000	
