= 1992 Pro Bowl =

National Football League all-star game

1992 NFL Pro Bowl
NFC	AFC
21	15
Head coach: Wayne Fontes (Detroit Lions)	Head coach: Dan Reeves (Denver Broncos)
	1	2	3	4	Total
NFC	7	7	0	7	21
AFC	7	5	0	3	15
- Date: February 2, 1992
- Stadium: Aloha Stadium; Honolulu, Hawaii
- MVP: Michael Irvin (Dallas Cowboys)
- Referee: Gerald Austin
- Attendance: 50,209

TV in the United States
- Network: ESPN
- Announcers: Mike Patrick, Joe Theismann & Chris Berman

The 1992 Pro Bowl was the NFL's 42nd annual all-star game which featured the outstanding performers from the 1991 season. The game was played on Sunday, February 2, 1992, at Aloha Stadium in Honolulu, Hawaii before a crowd of 50,209. The final score was NFC 21, AFC 15.

Dan Reeves of the Denver Broncos led the AFC team against an NFC team coached by Detroit Lions head coach Wayne Fontes. The referee was Gerald Austin.

Michael Irvin of the Dallas Cowboys was the game's MVP. Players on the winning NFC team received $10,000 apiece while the AFC participants each took home $5,000.

== AFC roster ==
=== Offense ===
Position	Starter(s)	Reserve(s)
Quarterback	12 Jim Kelly, Buffalo	7 John Elway, Denver; 1 Warren Moon, Houston; 13 Dan Marino, Miami; 7 Ken O'Brien, N. Y. Jets
Running back	34 Thurman Thomas, Buffalo	28 Gaston Green, Denver; 35 Marion Butts, San Diego
Fullback	35 Christian Okoye, Kansas City	32 John Williams, Seattle
Wide receiver	83 Andre Reed, Buffalo; 84 Haywood Jeffires, Houston	83 Mark Clayton, Miami; 80 James Lofton, Buffalo
Tight end	85 Marv Cook, New England	88 Ethan Horton, L. A. Raiders
Offensive tackle	78 Anthony Muñoz, Cincinnati; 78 Bruce Armstrong, New England	78 Richmond Webb, Miami
Offensive guard	63 Mike Munchak, Houston; 76 Steve Wisniewski, L. A. Raiders	51 Jim Richter, Buffalo
Center	74 Bruce Matthews, Houston	72 Don Mosebar, L. A. Raiders

=== Defense ===
Position	Starter(s)	Reserve(s)
Defensive end	93 Greg Townsend, L. A. Raiders; 95 William Fuller, Houston	90 Neil Smith, Kansas City
Defensive tackle	92 Michael Dean Perry, Cleveland; 79 Ray Childress, Houston	96 Cortez Kennedy, Seattle
Outside linebacker	97 Cornelius Bennett, Buffalo; 58 Derrick Thomas, Kansas City	56 Darryl Talley, Buffalo; 95 Greg Lloyd, Pittsburgh
Inside linebacker	54 Al Smith, Houston	77 Karl Mecklenburg, Denver; 55 Junior Seau, San Diego
Cornerback	28 Cris Dishman, Houston; 22 Gill Byrd, San Diego	26 Rod Woodson, Pittsburgh
Free safety	27 Steve Atwater, Denver	
Strong safety	42 Ronnie Lott, L. A. Raiders	49 Dennis Smith, Denver

=== Special teams ===
Position	Starter(s)	Reserve(s)
Punter	7 Jeff Gossett, L. A. Raiders	
Placekicker	18 Jeff Jaeger, L. A. Raiders	
Kick returner	81 Tim Brown, L. A. Raiders	
Special teamer	89 Steve Tasker, Buffalo	

== NFC roster ==
=== Offense ===
Position	Starter(s)	Reserve(s)
Quarterback	11 Mark Rypien, Washington	8 Troy Aikman, Dallas; 12 Chris Miller, Atlanta
Running back	20 Barry Sanders, Detroit	21 Earnest Byner, Washington; 22 Emmitt Smith, Dallas
Fullback	35 Neal Anderson, Chicago	
Wide receiver	88 Michael Irvin, Dallas; 80 Jerry Rice, San Francisco	84 Gary Clark, Washington; 80 Andre Rison, Atlanta
Tight end	84 Jay Novacek, Dallas	83 Steve Jordan, Minnesota
Offensive tackle	79 Jim Lachey, Washington; 75 Lomas Brown, Detroit	75 Chris Hinton, Atlanta
Offensive guard	64 Randall McDaniel, Minnesota; 62 Guy McIntyre, San Francisco	69 Mark Schlereth, Washington
Center	63 Jay Hilgenberg, Chicago	65 Bart Oates, N. Y. Giants

=== Defense ===
Position	Starter(s)	Reserve(s)
Defensive end	92 Reggie White, Philadelphia; 96 Clyde Simmons, Philadelphia	71 Charles Mann, Washington
Defensive tackle	99 Jerome Brown, Philadelphia; 93 Jerry Ball, Detroit	97 Henry Thomas, Minnesota
Outside linebacker	56 Pat Swilling, New Orleans; 59 Seth Joyner, Philadelphia	94 Charles Haley, San Francisco; 57 Rickey Jackson, New Orleans
Inside linebacker	50 Mike Singletary, Chicago	51 Sam Mills, New Orleans; 54 Chris Spielman, Detroit; 53 Vaughan Johnson, New Orleans
Cornerback	28 Darrell Green, Washington; 21 Deion Sanders, Atlanta	21 Eric Allen, Philadelphia
Free safety	36 Bennie Blades, Detroit	20 Mark Carrier, Chicago
Strong safety	46 Tim McDonald, Phoenix	23 Shaun Gayle, Chicago

=== Special teams ===
Position	Starter(s)	Reserve(s)
Punter	3 Rich Camarillo, Phoenix	
Placekicker	8 Chip Lohmiller, Washington	
Kick returner	23 Mel Gray, Detroit	
Special teamer	37 Bennie Thompson, New Orleans	
