= 1992 New Orleans Saints season =

NFL team season

- General manager: Jim Finks
- Head coach: Jim Mora
- Offensive coordinator: Carl Smith
- Defensive coordinator: Steve Sidwell
- Home stadium: Louisiana Superdome

Results
- Record: 12–4
- Division place: 2nd NFC West
- Playoffs: Lost Wild Card Playoffs (vs. Eagles) 20–36
- Pro Bowlers: C Joel Hilgenberg; LB Pat Swilling; LB Rickey Jackson; LB Sam Mills; LB Vaughan Johnson; K Morten Andersen

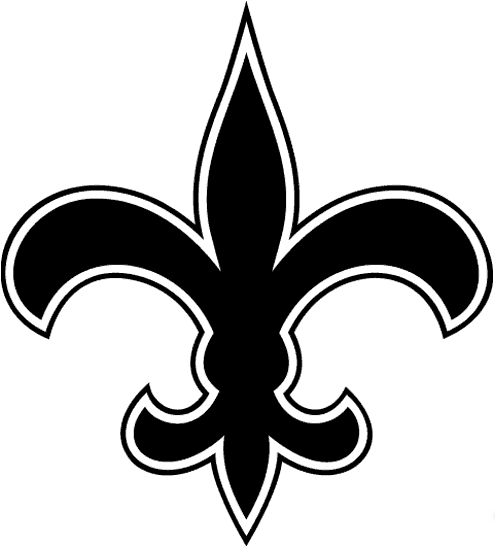
New Orleans Saints logo used from 1967-1999, including in the 1992 season

The 1992 New Orleans Saints season was the franchise's 26th season in the National Football League, and the 17th with home games at the Superdome. This is also the last time the Saints qualified to the postseason until the 2000 season.

The 1992 Saints surrendered only 202 points during the season (12.6 points per game), the lowest total by any team in the 1990s. They also gave up the fewest passing yards (2,470) and second-fewest total yards (4,075) of any team in 1992. This was also only the second season where four linebackers from the same team made the pro bowl with the other time being the year prior. This was the final season Antonio Gibson and Buford Jordan would play in the NFL.

== Offseason ==
The team entered 1992 with great expectations after its NFC West division title season of 1991. It was the franchise's first division championship since entering the NFL in 1967. Most preseason forecasts had the Saints making the playoffs again and another division title possible.

Additions	Subtractions
S Keith Taylor (Colts)	RB Stanford Jennings (Buccaneers)
	LB Brian Forde (Falcons)
	G Larry Williams (Patriots)
	FS Vencie Glenn (Vikings)
	SS Bennie Thompson (Chiefs)

=== NFL draft ===
1992 New Orleans Saints draft
Round	Pick	Player	Position	College	Notes
1	21	Vaughn Dunbar	Running back	Indiana	
3	72	Tyrone Legette	Defensive back	Nebraska	
4	95	Gene McGuire	Center	Notre Dame	
4	106	Sean Lumpkin	Defensive back	Minnesota	
5	138	Torrance Small	Wide receiver	Alcorn State	
6	164	Kary Vincent	Defensive back	Texas A&M	
8	218	Robert Stewart	Defensive tackle	Alabama	
9	245	Don Jones	Linebacker	Washington	
10	276	Marcus Dowdell	Wide receiver	Tennessee State	
11	303	Mike Gisler	Offensive guard	Houston	
12	330	Scott Adell	Offensive tackle	North Carolina State	
Made roster

== Personnel ==
=== Staff ===
1992 New Orleans Saints staff
Front office: Owner/general partner – Tom Benson; President/general manager – Jim Finks; Vice-president of administration – Jim Miller; Director of player personnel – Bill Kuharich; Head coaches: Head coach – Jim E. Mora; Offensive coaches: Offensive coordinator/quarterbacks – Carl Smith; Running backs – Jim Skipper; Wide receivers – Steve Walters; Offensive line – Paul Boudreau	Defensive coaches: Defensive coordinator – Steve Sidwell; Defensive line – John Pease; Linebackers – Vic Fangio; Defensive backs – Jim L. Mora; Special teams coaches: Special Teams/tight ends – Joe Marciano; Strength and conditioning: Strength and conditioning – Russell Paternostro

=== Roster ===
1992 New Orleans Saints roster
Quarterbacks (QB): 16 Mike Buck; 3 Bobby Hebert; 4 Steve Walsh; Running backs (RB): 32 Vaughn Dunbar KR; 34 Craig Heyward FB; 21 Dalton Hilliard; 23 Buford Jordan FB; Wide receivers (WR): 80 Wesley Carroll; 89 Quinn Early; 84 Eric Martin; 86 Pat Newman PR; 83 Torrance Small; Tight ends (TE): 85 Hoby Brenner; 49 Tommie Stowers; 87 Frank Wainright LS	Offensive linemen (OL): 67 Stan Brock T; 71 Richard Cooper T; 72 Jim Dombrowski G; 61 Joel Hilgenberg; 68 Paul Jetton G/C; 60 Derek Kennard G; 76 Gene McGuire C; 70 Chris Port G/T; Defensive linemen (DL): 91 Robert Goff NT; 93 Wayne Martin DE; 69 Les Miller; 99 Joel Smeenge DE; 73 Frank Warren DE; 94 Jim Wilks NT	Linebackers (LB): 57 Rickey Jackson OLB; 53 Vaughan Johnson ILB; 51 Sam Mills ILB; 56 Pat Swilling OLB; 97 Renaldo Turnbull OLB; 90 James Williams ILB; 92 DeMond Winston ILB; Defensive backs (DB): 28 Gene Atkins FS; 26 Vince Buck CB; 41 Toi Cook CB; 44 Antonio Gibson SS; 27 Reggie Jones CB; 46 Sean Lumpkin FS; 47 Cedric Mack CB; 37 Jimmy Spencer CB; 29 Keith Taylor SS; Special teams (ST): 7 Morten Andersen K; 6 Tommy Barnhardt P	Practice squad: 95 Michael Brandon DE; 19 Marcus Dowdell WR; 63 Karl Dunbar DE; 36 Derrick Ned FB; Reserve: 74 Kevin Haverdink T (IR); 43 Tyrone Legette CB (IR); 39 Brett Maxie SS (IR); 25 Fred McAfee (IR); 82 John Tice TE (IR); 65 Steve Trapilo G (IR); 88 Floyd Turner WR (IR); 47 active, 7 inactive, 4 practice squad Rookies in italics

== Regular season ==
The team opened 1992 at Philadelphia, their first road opener in 11 years. The usually steely defense showed some chinks as Eagles running back Herschel Walker rushed for more than 100 yards. Turnovers caused by the two great defenses kept the game close, but the Eagles won 15–13. Offensive struggles continued the next week vs. Chicago, as the Bears led 6–0 at halftime. Big plays on both sides of the ball broke it open for the Saints, as quarterback Bobby Hebert connected with wide receivers Eric Martin and Wesley Carroll on touchdown passes of 52 and 72 yards, respectively. Two second half scores by the Saints' defense capped the 28–6 win – a fumble return by Robert "Pig" Goff and an interception return by Reggie Jones. Those plays set the tone for the defensive unit throughout 1992.

A 10–7 win over Atlanta followed and set up the annual battle with the San Francisco 49ers. The 49ers had worn the title of "Team of the Decade" for the 1980s and were the primary stumbling block for an otherwise resurgent Saints franchise during Jim Mora's tenure as head coach. The Sunday night, prime-time audience saw a tight contest throughout. With the Niners leading 16–10, the Saints faced first-and-goal at the San Francisco 2-yard line. Saints guard Derek Kennard was flagged for holding and, on the next play, a pass into tight coverage was picked off by 49ers cornerback Eric Davis. It was the Saints' sixth consecutive home game against the Niners decided by seven points or less.

The team rebounded with five straight wins and stood at 7–2 in the road game vs. the Niners. For three quarters, the Saints dominated the clock and scoreboard, leading 20–7 on two touchdown passes by Hebert. But the defense couldn't hold the lead as Steve Young led San Francisco on two touchdown drives in the 4th quarter to win 21–20.

Most impressive of the Saints' 12 wins in 1992 came over the next three weeks, when the team won three home games in a 10-day span. The first was a Monday Night win over the Washington Redskins, 20–3, keyed by a Hebert-to-Early touchdown pass and stifling defense.

Another eventual playoff team came to the Superdome the following Sunday, as the Miami Dolphins took a 13–10 lead into the second half. A blindsiding takeaway from Dolphins quarterback Dan Marino by speed-rushing linebacker Pat Swilling led to Robert Goff's second fumble return touchdown of the season. Later, cornerback Vince Buck returned an interception for a score as the Dolphins were defeated, 24–13.

The third game in this trifecta was a Thursday night tilt against Atlanta. Despite several marches up and down the field – and a memorable rumble by fullback Craig "Ironhead" Heyward that left Falcons safety Scott Case staring up at the ring of lights high above the field – the Saints offense managed just five field goals by late in the 4th quarter to lead 15–14. It was another defensive touchdown that saved the game for the Saints, this time an interception by Toi Cook. The Saints won two of their last three to finish 12–4, which was the second-best finish in team history.

=== Schedule ===
Week	Date	Opponent	Result	Record	Venue	Attendance
1	September 6	at Philadelphia Eagles	**L** 13–15	0–1	Veterans Stadium	63,513
2	September 13	Chicago Bears	**W** 28–6	1–1	Louisiana Superdome	68,591
3	September 20	at **Atlanta Falcons**	**W** 10–7	2–1	Georgia Dome	67,328
4	September 27	**San Francisco 49ers**	**L** 10–16	2–2	Louisiana Superdome	68,591
5	October 4	at Detroit Lions	**W** 13–7	3–2	Pontiac Silverdome	66,971
6	October 11	**Los Angeles Rams**	**W** 13–10	4–2	Louisiana Superdome	68,591
7	October 18	at Phoenix Cardinals	**W** 30–21	5–2	Sun Devil Stadium	27,735
8	Bye					
9	November 1	Tampa Bay Buccaneers	**W** 23–21	6–2	Louisiana Superdome	68,591
10	November 8	at New England Patriots	**W** 31–14	7–2	Foxboro Stadium	45,413
11	November 15	at **San Francisco 49ers**	**L** 20–21	7–3	Candlestick Park	64,895
12	November 23	Washington Redskins	**W** 20–3	8–3	Louisiana Superdome	68,591
13	November 29	Miami Dolphins	**W** 24–13	9–3	Louisiana Superdome	68,591
14	December 3	**Atlanta Falcons**	**W** 22–14	10–3	Louisiana Superdome	68,591
15	December 13	at **Los Angeles Rams**	**W** 37–14	11–3	Anaheim Stadium	47,355
16	December 20	Buffalo Bills	**L** 16–20	11–4	Louisiana Superdome	68,591
17	December 26	at New York Jets	**W** 20–0	12–4	Giants Stadium	45,614
Note: Intra-division opponents are in **bold** text.

=== Standings ===
NFC West
	W	L	T	PCT	DIV	CONF	PF	PA	STK
^{(1)} San Francisco 49ers	14	2	0	.875	6–0	11–1	431	236	W8
^{(4)} New Orleans Saints	12	4	0	.750	4–2	9–3	330	202	W1
Atlanta Falcons	6	10	0	.375	1–5	4–8	327	414	L2
Los Angeles Rams	6	10	0	.375	1–5	4–8	313	383	W1

== Postseason ==
Round	Date	Opponent (seed)	Result	Record	Venue	Attendance
Wildcard	January 3, 1993	Philadelphia Eagles (5)	L 20–36	0–2	Louisiana Superdome	68,893

=== NFC Wild Card Game ===
==== NFC: Philadelphia Eagles 36, New Orleans Saints 20 ====
Philadelphia Eagles vs. New Orleans Saints – Game summary

Quarter	1	2	3	4	Total
Eagles	7	0	3	26	36
Saints	7	10	3	0	20

at Louisiana Superdome, New Orleans, Louisiana

- Game time: 4:00 p.m. EST/3:00 p.m. CST
- Game weather: Played indoors, domed stadium
- Game attendance: 68,591
- Referee: Dale Hamer
- TV announcers (CBS): Pat Summerall (play-by-play) and John Madden (color commentator)

Game information
- Scoring
  - NO – Heyward 1 run (Andersen kick) NO 7-0
  - PHI – Barnett 57 pass from Cunningham (Ruzek kick) Tie 7–7
  - NO – field goal Andersen 35 NO 10-7
  - NO – Early 7 pass from Hebert (Andersen kick) NO 17-7
  - NO – field goal Andersen 42 NO 20-7
  - PHI – field goal Ruzek 40 NO 20-10
  - PHI – Barnett 35 pass from Cunningham (Ruzek kick) NO 20-17
  - PHI – Sherman 6 run (Ruzek kick) PHI 24–20
  - PHI – Safety, White sacked Hebert in end zone PHI 26–20
  - PHI – field goal Ruzek 39 PHI 29–20
  - PHI – Allen 18 interception return (Ruzek kick) PHI 36–20

Despite the .750 winning percentage, the Saints couldn't catch the 14–2 Niners for the division crown. In the Wild Card Game, the Saints faced the Philadelphia Eagles in a rematch of their tough opening game loss and an equally bruising game in 1991 won by the Saints. The Saints dictated the pace during the first half, leading 20–7 on a Heyward touchdown run and a Hebert-to-Early touchdown pass. Big plays on both sides of the ball turned game in the Eagles favor, the first being a Randall Cunningham-to-Fred Barnett touchdown pass and the last an interception return for a score by Eric Allen. The Eagles scored 26 points in the 4th quarter to win, 36–20. Until the 2018 NFC Championship Game, this was the last time the Saints lost a playoff game at home. They would lose two of their next three after that at home as well.

== Awards and records ==
Statistically, the team finished with the top defense in the league in points allowed (202) and second-best in total yards allowed (254.6 per game) They were 5th in the NFL in the giveaway-takeaway ratio(+9)as the defense feasted on 20 fumbles and 18 interceptions. Of those 38 takeaways, six were returned for touchdowns. Sam Mills led the team in tackles with 130. Wayne Martin led the team in sacks, with 15.5. On offense, the team's passing game enjoyed its best season of the Jim Mora era to date. Hebert completed 59 percent of his passes for 3,287 yards and 19 touchdowns. Wide receiver Eric Martin had the third and final 1,000-yard season of his career.
