= Clyde Simmons =

American football player and coach (born 1964)

Current position
- Team: Bowling Green Falcons
- Conference: MAC

Biographical details
- Born: August 4, 1964 (age 62); Lane, South Carolina, U.S.
- Education: Wilmington (NC) New Hanover, Western Carolina University (1996)

Playing career
- 1983–1985: Western Carolina
- 1986–1993: Philadelphia Eagles
- 1994–1995: Arizona Cardinals
- 1996–1997: Jacksonville Jaguars
- 1998: Cincinnati Bengals
- 1999–2000: Chicago Bears
- Position: Defensive end

Coaching career (HC unless noted)
- 2012–2016: St. Louis / Los Angeles Rams (ADL)
- 2017–2018: Cleveland Browns (DL)
- 2019: Missouri Baptist (DL)
- 2020: Western Carolina (DL)
- 2021–2024: Tennessee State (DL)
- 2025–present: Bowling Green (DL)

Accomplishments and honors

Awards
- As a player: 2× First-team All-Pro (1991, 1992); 2× Pro Bowl (1991, 1992); NFL sacks leader (1992); NFL forced fumbles co-leader (1995); Philadelphia Eagles 75th Anniversary Team; Philadelphia Eagles Hall of Fame; Western Carolina University Athletics Hall of Fame

Clyde Simmons Jr. (born August 4, 1964) is an American football coach who currently is the defensive line coach for the Bowling Green Falcons. He played as a defensive end in the National Football League (NFL). He was a twice first-team All-Pro and a twice Pro Bowl selection with the Philadelphia Eagles. He was named to the Philadelphia Eagles Hall of Fame.

== Playing career ==
=== College ===
Simmons played college football at Western Carolina University helping lead the Catamounts to the 1983 NCAA Division I-AA National Championship game. In 1992 he was inducted into the Western Carolina Athletics Hall of Fame.

=== NFL ===
Simmons was selected in the ninth round of the 1986 NFL draft by the Philadelphia Eagles where he spent 8 seasons (1986–1993). After leaving Philadelphia he went on to play for the Arizona Cardinals (1994–1995), Jacksonville Jaguars (1996–1997), Cincinnati Bengals (1998), and the Chicago Bears (1999–2000). He led the NFL with 19 sacks in 1992 and finished his career 11th all time on the NFL sack list, with 121.5. (Currently ranked 22nd all time.)He was selected to the Pro Bowl in 1991 and 1992. Simmons also returned an interception for a touchdown against Jim Kelly and the Buffalo Bills in the 1996 NFL Playoffs.

== Post-playing career ==
Simmons began his coaching career in 2008 at Greater Atlanta Christian School as the defensive line coach.

In 2010, he accepted an offer from Rex Ryan as a fellowship coach with the New York Jets.

Simmons was an assistant defensive line coach for the St. Louis/Los Angeles Rams. The Rams had 217 total sacks during Simmons' tenure. With the Rams, Simmons coached three-time Pro Bowl defensive tackle and the 2014 NFL Defensive Rookie of the Year Aaron Donald, and defensive end Robert Quinn, who set a single-season franchise record with 19 sacks in 2013. In January 2017, he was hired by the Cleveland Browns to coach their defensive line.

In 2019, he was hired as a defensive line coach at Missouri Baptist.

In May 2021, he was hired by new Tennessee State head football coach Eddie George as the Tigers' defensive line coach.

In March 2025, he was hired as the defensive line coach at Bowling Green.
