= Tyrone Legette =

American football player (born 1970)

No. 43, 45
- Position: Cornerback

Personal information
- Born: January 15, 1970 (age 56); Columbia, South Carolina, U.S.
- Listed height: 5 ft 9 in (1.75 m)
- Listed weight: 179 lb (81 kg)

Career information
- High school: Spring Valley (Columbia, South Carolina)
- College: Nebraska
- NFL draft: 1992: 3rd round, 72nd overall pick

Career history
- New Orleans Saints (1992–1995); Tampa Bay Buccaneers (1996–1997); San Francisco 49ers (1998); Carolina Panthers (1999)*
- * Offseason or practice squad member only

Awards and highlights
- First-team All-Big Eight (1991)

Career NFL statistics
- Tackles: 123
- Sacks: 2
- Interceptions: 2
- Stats at Pro Football Reference

Tyrone Christopher Legette (born February 15, 1970) is an American former professional football player who was a cornerback in the National Football League (NFL). He played seven seasons for the New Orleans Saints, the Tampa Bay Buccaneers, and the San Francisco 49ers. He was selected by the Saints in the third round of the 1992 NFL draft. After retiring from the NFL, he became a real estate developer, founding Legette Construction in New Orleans.

== Early life and education ==
Born in 1970, Tyrone Legette was born and raised in Columbia, South Carolina. He was the youngest of 10 siblings. His mother owned and operated a restaurant, the Blue Palace Tea Shop.

== Football career ==
Legette played football collegiately at Nebraska with the Cornhuskers. He was a third-round pick for the New Orleans Saints in the 1992 NFL draft. He played for the Saints in 1992, 1993, 1994, and 1995. He played 53 games for the Saints, with 84 tackles.

After four seasons in New Orleans, in 1996 he started two years as a reserve cornerback and special teams player for the Tampa Bay Buccaneers, joining as a free agent. That season, he "led the club in special-teams tackles... with 19 and was part of a punt-coverage team that allowed 6.5 yards per return, third-best in the NFL." Tampa Bay signed him as a cornerback in February 1997.

He was released by the Buccaneers at the end of August 1998, and had surgery to repair cartilage damage in his right knee. After a several month recovery, the San Francisco 49ers signed Legette in November 1998. After ultimately playing for the NFL for seven years, he retired from the NFL in 1998.

After retiring from football, he moved to New Orleans, where he started Legette Construction Inc. and became a property developer in nearby Brownfields. In 2016, he opened a grocery store in Baton Rouge.

== Personal life ==
He and his wife have two children.

== See also ==
- List of Nebraska Cornhuskers in the NFL draft
- List of NFL players with chronic traumatic encephalopathy
- List of Spring Valley High School alumni
- New Orleans Saints all-time roster
