= Torrance Small =

American football player (born 1970)

No. 83, 87, 80, 84
- Position: Wide receiver

Personal information
- Born: September 4, 1970 (age 56); Tampa, Florida, U.S.
- Listed height: 6 ft 3 in (1.91 m)
- Listed weight: 220 lb (100 kg)

Career information
- High school: Thomas Jefferson (Tampa)
- College: Alcorn State
- NFL draft: 1992: 5th round, 138th overall pick

Career history
- New Orleans Saints (1992–1996); St. Louis Rams (1997); Indianapolis Colts (1998); Philadelphia Eagles (1999–2000); New England Patriots (2001)

Career NFL statistics
- Receptions: 346
- Receiving yards: 4,602
- Receiving touchdowns: 31
- Stats at Pro Football Reference

Torrance Ramon Small (born September 4, 1970) is an American former professional football player who was a wide receiver for 10 seasons in the National Football League (NFL) for the New Orleans Saints, St. Louis Rams, Indianapolis Colts, Philadelphia Eagles, and New England Patriots. He played college football for the Alcorn State Braves and was selected by the Saints in the fifth round of the 1992 NFL draft with the 138th overall pick.

Pre-draft measurables
Height	Weight	Arm length	Hand span	40-yard dash	10-yard split	20-yard split	20-yard shuttle	Vertical jump
6 ft 3 in (1.91 m)	201 lb (91 kg)	32 in (0.81 m)	9 1/4 in (0.23 m)	4.61 s	1.60 s	2.66 s	4.35 s	30.5 in (0.77 m)

== NFL career statistics ==
Legend
**Bold**	Career high

=== Regular season ===
Year	Team	Games		Receiving				
Year	Team	GP	GS	Rec	Yds	Avg	Lng	TD
1992	NOR	13	2	23	278	12.1	33	3
1993	NOR	11	0	16	164	10.3	17	1
1994	NOR	**16**	0	49	**719**	14.7	75	5
1995	NOR	**16**	1	38	461	12.1	32	5
1996	NOR	**16**	13	**50**	558	11.2	41	2
1997	STL	13	7	32	488	**15.3**	46	1
1998	IND	**16**	4	45	681	15.1	53	**7**
1999	PHI	15	**15**	49	655	13.4	**84**	4
2000	PHI	14	14	40	569	14.2	70	3
2001	NWE	3	0	4	29	7.3	11	0
		133	56	346	4,602	13.3	84	31

=== Playoffs ===
Year	Team	Games		Receiving				
Year	Team	GP	GS	Rec	Yds	Avg	Lng	TD
1992	NOR	1	0	1	6	6.0	6	0
2000	PHI	**2**	**2**	**7**	**69**	**9.9**	**16**	**1**
		3	2	8	75	9.4	16	1
