= Steve Sidwell (disambiguation) =

Steve Sidwell (born 1982) is an English football midfielder.

Steve Sidwell may also refer to:

- Steve Sidwell (musician), English composer, conductor, and trumpeter
- Steve Sidwell (American football) (1944–2023), American football coach
