= Tre Swilling =

American football player (born 1999)

Profile
- Position: Cornerback

Personal information
- Born: March 26, 1999 (age 27); New Orleans, Louisiana, U.S.
- Listed height: 6 ft 1 in (1.85 m)
- Listed weight: 196 lb (89 kg)

Career information
- High school: Brother Martin (New Orleans)
- College: Georgia Tech (2017–2021)
- NFL draft: 2022: undrafted

Career history
- Tennessee Titans (2022)*; New Orleans Saints (2022)*; San Francisco 49ers (2022–2023); Baltimore Ravens (2023)*; New York Jets (2024)*; Carolina Panthers (2025)*
- * Offseason or practice squad member only

Career NFL statistics as of 2023
- Games played: 2
- Stats at Pro Football Reference

Tre Swilling (born March 26, 1999) is an American professional football cornerback. He played college football for the Georgia Tech Yellow Jackets.

== Early life ==
Swilling was born in New Orleans, Louisiana and attended Brother Martin High School. Swilling would decide to commit to play college football at Georgia Tech over other schools such as Alabama, Florida, Florida State, LSU, and Michigan.

== College career ==
In week ten of the 2018 season, Swilling recorded his first career interception, as he helped Georgia Tech beat North Carolina. Swilling finished the 2018 season with 24 tackles with 1.5 going for a loss, a sack, six pass deflections, an interception, and a forced fumble. In week one of the 2019 season, Swilling broke up a pass and intercepted a pass off of quarterback Trevor Lawrence returning it 41 yards, but the Yellow Jackets would fall against Clemson. Swilling finished the 2019 season with 23 tackles with two being for a loss, ten pass deflections, an interception, and a fumble recovery. For his performance on the season, Swilling was named an All-ACC Honorable Mention. In the 2020 season, Swilling recorded 21 tackles, a pass deflection, a fumble recovery, and a forced fumble. In the 2021 season, Swilling notched 33 tackles with two being for a loss, a sack, and four pass deflections.

Swilling finished his Georgia Tech career with 101 tackles with 5.5 going for a loss, two sacks, 21 pass deflections, two interceptions, two fumble recoveries, and two forced fumbles.

== Professional career ==
Pre-draft measurables
Height	Weight	Arm length	Hand span	40-yard dash	10-yard split	20-yard split	20-yard shuttle	Three-cone drill	Vertical jump	Broad jump	Bench press
6 ft 0 3/4 in (1.85 m)	196 lb (89 kg)	31 3/4 in (0.81 m)	9 5/8 in (0.24 m)	4.67 s	1.65 s	2.75 s	4.15 s	6.81 s	37 in (0.94 m)	10 ft 6 in (3.20 m)	15 reps
All values from Pro Day

=== Tennessee Titans ===
On April 30, 2022, Swilling was signed to the Tennessee Titans as an undrafted free agent after going unselected in the 2022 NFL draft. Swilling was waived on August 30, 2022.

=== New Orleans Saints ===
On September 12, 2022, Swilling was signed to the New Orleans Saints practice squad. He was released on October 4, 2022.

=== San Francisco 49ers ===
On December 20, 2022, Swilling was signed to the San Francisco 49ers practice squad. He was released on December 27, 2022. On February 6, 2023, Swilling was re-signed to the 49ers to a reserve/future contract. He was waived on August 29, 2023, but was re-signed to the practice squad the next day. On September 16, 2023, Swilling was elevated from the practice squad to the active roster after cornerback Samuel Womack was placed on the injured reserve due to an MCL injury. He saw action in two games on special teams before being waived again on September 21, 2023.

=== Baltimore Ravens ===
On October 3, 2023, Swilling was signed to the Baltimore Ravens practice squad. He signed a reserve/future contract on January 29, 2024. He was waived on July 22.

=== New York Jets ===
Swilling was signed by the New York Jets on August 2, 2024. He was waived on August 27, and re-signed to the practice squad. He was active for one game, playing in the Jets' final game of the regular season, a 30-20 win over the Miami Dolphins in which he played on special teams. Following the season, Swilling signed a reserve/future contract with New York on January 6, 2025. On June 12, Swilling was waived by the Jets.

=== Carolina Panthers ===
On July 23, 2025, Swilling signed with the Carolina Panthers. He was waived on August 25.

== Personal life ==
Swilling is the son of College Football Hall of Fame linebacker, Pat Swilling.
