= Morten Andersen =

Danish-American football player (born 1960)

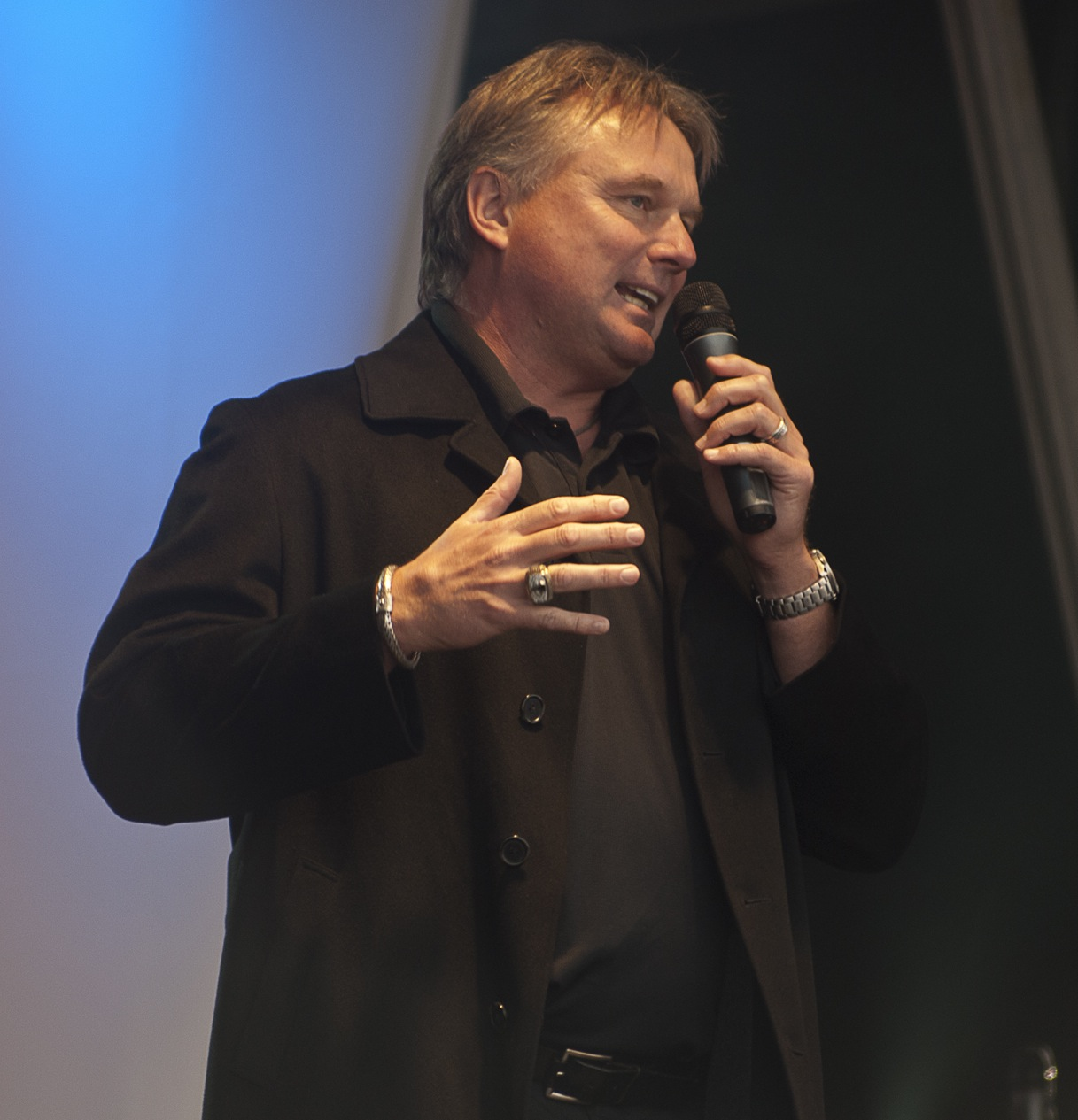
- Andersen in 2010

No. 7, 5, 8
- Position: Kicker

Personal information
- Born: 19 August 1960 (age 66); Copenhagen, Denmark
- Listed height: 6 ft 2 in (1.88 m)
- Listed weight: 217 lb (98 kg)

Career information
- High school: Ben Davis (Indianapolis, Indiana, U.S.)
- College: Michigan State (1978–1981)
- NFL draft: 1982: 4th round, 86th overall pick

Career history
- New Orleans Saints (1982–1994); Atlanta Falcons (1995–2000); New York Giants (2001); Kansas City Chiefs (2002–2003); Minnesota Vikings (2004); Atlanta Falcons (2006–2007)

Awards and highlights
- 4× First-team All-Pro (1985–1987, 1995); 2× Second-team All-Pro (1988, 1992); 7× Pro Bowl (1985–1988, 1990, 1992, 1995); 2× Golden Toe Award (1986, 1995); NFL 1980s All-Decade Team; NFL 1990s All-Decade Team; Walter Camp Man of the Year (2008); First-team All-American (1981); First-team All-Big Ten (1981); 2× Second-team All-Big Ten (1979, 1980); New Orleans Saints Ring of Honor (2015); New Orleans Saints Hall of Fame (2009); NFL records: Most games played: 382; Most consecutive games scoring: 360 (Note: From 1983 to 2004, and 2006 to 2007)

Career NFL statistics
- Field goals attempted: 709
- Field goals made: 565
- Field goal percentage: 79.7%
- Longest field goal: 60
- Extra points attempted: 859
- Extra points made: 849
- Extra point percentage: 98.8%
- Points scored: 2,544
- Stats at Pro Football Reference
- Pro Football Hall of Fame

Morten Andersen (born 19 August 1960), nicknamed "the Great Dane", is a Danish-American former professional football kicker who played in the National Football League (NFL) for 25 seasons, most notably with the New Orleans Saints and Atlanta Falcons. Following a career from 1982 to 2007, Andersen holds the NFL record for regular season games played at 382. He also ranks second in field goals (565) and points scored (2,544). In addition to his league accomplishments, he is the Saints all-time leading scorer at 1,318 points. Andersen was inducted into the Pro Football Hall of Fame in 2017. Along with Jan Stenerud and Adam Vinatieri, he is one of only three exclusive kickers to receive the honor.

== Early life ==
Andersen was born in Copenhagen and raised in the west Jutland town of Struer. As a student, he was a gymnast and a long jumper, and just missed becoming a member of the Danish junior national soccer team. He visited the United States in 1977 as a Youth For Understanding exchange student. He first kicked an American football on a whim at Ben Davis High School in Indianapolis. He was so impressive in his one season of high school football that he was given a scholarship to Michigan State University.

Andersen, with his left leg as his dominant kicking leg, starred at Michigan State, setting several records, including a Big Ten Conference record 63-yard field goal against Ohio State University. He was named an All-American in 1981. On 24 September 2011, he was inducted into the Michigan State University Athletics Hall of Fame.

== Professional career ==
=== New Orleans Saints, 1982–1994 ===
Andersen was selected by the New Orleans Saints in the fourth round, with the 82nd overall pick, of the 1982 NFL draft. Andersen's NFL career got off to a rocky start. On his first NFL kickoff to start the strike-shortened 1982 season, Andersen twisted his ankle and missed eight weeks of the season. Despite the early setback, he soon emerged as one of the strongest and most reliable placekickers in the NFL. In his years with the Saints, he was named to six Pro Bowls, kicked 302 field goals, and scored 1318 points. In 1991, against Chicago, Andersen kicked a 60-yard field goal, tying him with Steve Cox for the second-longest field goal in league history at the time, behind 63-yard record-holder kicked by Tom Dempsey. Andersen's kick has since been matched by Rob Bironas, Dan Carpenter and Greg Zuerlein, and surpassed by Sebastian Janikowski (twice), Jason Elam, Justin Tucker, Cam Little (twice), Jay Feely, Matt Bryant, David Akers, Matt Prater, Jake Elliott, Graham Gano, Brett Maher, Brandon Aubrey and Stephen Gostkowski. Andersen's proficiency with field goal kicking earned him the nickname "Mr. Automatic." Following the 1994 season, he was released by the Saints for salary cap purposes and because his accuracy had started to decline.

=== Atlanta Falcons, 1995–2000 ===
Following his release by the Saints, Andersen signed with the Atlanta Falcons. He silenced those who felt him to be washed up and was once again named a Pro Bowler during his time in Atlanta. In December 1995 against the Saints, he became the first player in NFL history to kick three field goals of over 50 yards in a single game.

In week 17 of the 1996 season, Andersen missed a 30-yard field goal that enabled the Jacksonville Jaguars to make the playoffs. Two years later, he kicked a game-winning field goal in overtime in the 1998 NFC Championship Game to beat the Minnesota Vikings and send the Falcons to their first-ever Super Bowl appearance, falling to the Denver Broncos in Super Bowl XXXIII.

There are a number of interesting coincidences between Andersen and former NFL placekicker Gary Anderson. Anderson and Andersen have nearly identical last names, were born within a year of one another outside the United States (Anderson was born in South Africa), came to the United States as teenagers, were both drafted in 1982, had long and successful NFL careers throughout the 1980s and 1990s (and both retiring in the 2000s decade), and hold first or second place in a number of NFL records for scoring, field goals, and longevity. Their overall accuracy is also nearly identical; their career percentage being within .5% of each other on both FGs and PATs. Also, Anderson missed a field goal in the 1998 NFC Championship Game for the Minnesota Vikings before Andersen kicked his winning kick, both from the same distance as well (38 yards).

=== Intermittent years, 2001–2004 ===
Andersen went on to play with the New York Giants for the 2001 season, followed by the Kansas City Chiefs the following two seasons. In the 2004 offseason, Andersen was beaten out for the kicking job by rookie Lawrence Tynes. He was released by the Chiefs for the final roster cut, and was subsequently signed by the Vikings. Although his leg strength had declined greatly with age, he continued to prove himself accurate for field goals. Having not been signed by a team following the 2004 season, he became a free agent and did not play in 2005. He announced NFL Europe games in the 2005 season.

=== Atlanta Falcons, 2006–2007 ===
In January 2006, Andersen was inducted as the first member of the Danish American Football Federation Hall of Fame. Later that year, Andersen returned to the NFL, re-signing with the Atlanta Falcons; Andersen was brought in to help Michael Koenen, who was at the time performing double duty as punter and kicker (an extremely rare occurrence in the NFL) missing several field goals in that capacity, and Koenen reverted to strictly punting after Andersen's signing. His first game back was against his former team, the Saints, on Monday Night Football. The game was the first game in the Louisiana Superdome since Hurricane Katrina prevented its use for the entire 2005 regular season. Andersen scored the only Falcon points with a 26-yard field goal in the first quarter. In his second game back, Andersen made 5 of 5 field goals (matching his career-best for the ninth time), as well as both extra-point attempts. He was named NFC special teams player of the week, becoming the oldest player to earn the honor since the award was first introduced in 1984. He is the team record holder in points for the New Orleans Saints.

On 16 December 2006, Andersen passed Gary Anderson to become the all-time leading scorer in NFL history. The following weekend, 24 December 2006, Andersen again passed Anderson to become the NFL's career leader in field goals made. On 17 September 2007, he again signed with the Falcons in an attempt to secure their unreliable kicking game. By the end of the regular season, he had made 25 of 28 field goals (89.3%), the most accurate season of his career.

=== Retirement and legacy ===
In the 2008 season, Andersen did not receive a contract offer from any team, but waited until 8 December to officially retire. Andersen had stated that his goal was to be the first NFL player to play until he turned 50 in 2010. However, he retired just two days after he would have become the oldest player ever to appear in an NFL game, had he played on or after 6 December he would have been the oldest NFL player to play. The record held by George Blanda still stands – Blanda played in his last NFL game on 4 January 1976 (the 1975 AFC Championship) at the age of 48 years, 109 days.

On 6 November 2009, Andersen was inducted into the New Orleans Saints Hall of Fame. On 25 June 2011, Andersen was inducted into the Louisiana Sports Hall of Fame. On 10 August 2013, Andersen was inducted into the Greater New Orleans Sports Hall of Fame. On 21 December 2015, he was inducted as the fourth member of the team's Ring of Honor. On 4 February 2017, it was announced that Andersen would be inducted into the Pro Football Hall of Fame.

On 10 September 2020, he launched a new weekly football podcast with the VegasInsider Podcast Network titled "Great Dane Nation" with co-host Tom "FreezePops" Carroll.

== NFL career statistics ==
Legend
	NFL record
	Led the league
**Bold**	Career high
Underline	Incomplete data

=== Regular season ===
Year	Team	GP	Field Goals				PATs			Kickoffs					Pts
Year	Team	GP	FGM	FGA	Lng	FG%	XPM	XPA	XP%	KO	Yds	Y/K	TB	TB%	Pts
1982	NO	8	2	5	36	40.0%	6	6	**100.0%**	—	—	—	—	—	12
1983	NO	16	18	24	52	75.0%	37	38	97.4%	—	—	—	—	—	91
1984	NO	16	20	27	53	74.1%	34	34	**100.0%**	—	—	—	—	—	94
1985	NO	16	**31**	35	55	88.6%	27	29	93.1%	—	—	—	—	—	120
1986	NO	16	26	30	53	86.7%	30	30	**100.0%**	—	—	—	—	—	108
1987	NO	12	28	36	52	77.8%	37	37	**100.0%**	—	—	—	—	—	121
1988	NO	16	26	36	51	72.2%	32	33	97.0%	—	—	—	—	—	110
1989	NO	16	20	29	49	69.0%	44	45	97.8%	—	—	—	—	—	104
1990	NO	16	21	27	52	77.8%	29	29	**100.0%**	—	—	—	—	—	92
1991	NO	16	25	32	**60**	78.1%	38	38	**100.0%**	79	5,157	65.3	**43**	**54.4%**	113
1992	NO	16	29	34	52	85.3%	33	34	97.1%	81	5,178	63.9	38	46.9%	120
1993	NO	16	28	35	56	80.0%	33	33	**100.0%**	76	4,825	63.5	35	46.1%	117
1994	NO	16	28	**39**	48	71.8%	32	32	**100.0%**	82	5,087	62.0	14	17.1%	116
1995	ATL	16	**31**	37	59	83.8%	29	30	96.7%	82	5,646	**68.9**	27	32.9%	**122**
1996	ATL	16	22	29	54	75.9%	31	31	**100.0%**	71	4,717	66.4	16	22.5%	97
1997	ATL	16	23	27	55	85.2%	35	35	**100.0%**	63	4,125	65.5	17	27.0%	104
1998	ATL	16	23	28	53	82.1%	51	52	98.1%	**90**	**6,153**	68.4	20	22.2%	120
1999	ATL	16	15	21	49	71.4%	34	34	**100.0%**	63	4,048	64.3	7	11.1%	79
2000	ATL	16	25	31	51	80.6%	23	23	**100.0%**	64	4,168	65.1	12	18.8%	98
2001	NYG	16	23	28	51	82.1%	29	30	96.7%	27	1,585	58.7	—	—	98
2002	KC	14	22	26	50	84.6%	51	51	**100.0%**	64	3,788	59.2	6	9.4%	117
2003	KC	16	16	20	49	80.0%	**58**	**59**	98.3%	—	—	—	—	—	106
2004	MIN	16	18	22	48	81.8%	45	45	**100.0%**	8	433	54.1	—	—	99
2006	ATL	14	20	23	45	87.0%	27	27	**100.0%**	—	—	—	—	—	87
2007	ATL	14	25	28	47	**89.3%**	24	24	**100.0%**	—	—	—	—	—	99
Career		382	565	709	60	79.7%	849	859	98.8%	850	54,910	64.6	235	27.6%	2,544

=== Postseason ===
Year	Team	GP	Field Goals			PATs			Kickoffs					Pts
Year	Team	GP	FGM	FGA	FG%	XPM	XPA	XP%	KO	Yds	Y/K	TB	TB%	Pts
1987	NO	1	1	1	**100.0%**	1	1	**100.0%**	—	—	—	—	—	4
1990	NO	1	2	4	50.0%	0	0	—	—	—	—	—	—	6
1991	NO	1	2	2	**100.0%**	2	2	**100.0%**	5	298	59.6	2	40.0%	8
1992	NO	1	2	2	**100.0%**	2	2	**100.0%**	5	345	**69.0**	3	**60.0%**	8
1995	ATL	1	2	2	**100.0%**	2	2	**100.0%**	5	226	45.2	—	—	8
1998	ATL	3	**7**	**8**	87.5%	**6**	**6**	**100.0%**	**17**	**1,092**	64.2	**7**	41.2%	**27**
2003	KC	1	1	2	50.0%	4	4	**100.0%**	—	—	—	—	—	7
2004	MIN	2	1	2	50.0%	**6**	**6**	**100.0%**	1	10	10.0	—	—	9
Career		11	18	23	78.3%	23	23	100.0%	33	1,971	59.7	12	36.4%	77

== Career highlights ==
=== Awards and honors ===
NFL

- 4× First-team All-Pro (1985–1987, 1995)
- 2× Second-team All-Pro (1988, 1992)
- 7× Pro Bowl (1985–1988, 1990, 1992, 1995)
- 2× Golden Toe Award (1986, 1995)
- NFL 1980s All-Decade Team
- NFL 1990s All-Decade Team
- New Orleans Saints Ring of Honor (2015)
- New Orleans Saints Hall of Fame (2009)

College

- First-team All-American (1981)
- First-team All-Big Ten (1981)
- 2× Second-team All-Big Ten (1979, 1980)
- Walter Camp Man of the Year (2008)
- Michigan State Athletics Hall of Fame

Other

- Louisiana Sports Hall of Fame
- Indiana Sports Hall of Fame
- Greater New Orleans Sports Hall of Fame
- Atlanta Sports Hall of Fame

=== NFL records ===
At the end of his career Andersen held the following NFL records (as of 2009):

- Most games played (career) – 382
- Most consecutive games played by a placekicker – 248
- Most seasons, 75 or more points (career) – 24
- Most consecutive seasons, 75 or more points (career) – 23
- Most seasons, 90 or more points (career) – 22
- Most game-winning field goals (career) – 103
- Games with 1+ field goals (career) – 299
- Games with 2+ field goals (career) – 178
- Oldest player to score 14 points in a game – 47 years, 133 days (for Atlanta Falcons vs. Seattle Seahawks, 30 December 2007)
- Oldest player to kick 4 field goals in a game – 47 years, 42 days (for Atlanta Falcons vs. Houston Texans, 30 September 2007)
- Oldest player to kick 5 field goals in a game – 46 years, 43 days
- Most field goals (50 or more yards) in a game – 3 (vs. New Orleans, 10 December 1995) (tied with several players)
- Most consecutive games scoring (career) – 360
- Most games scoring (career) – 379
- Most consecutive seasons scoring (career) – 23 – tied with Gary Anderson
- Most consecutive calendar years scoring (career) – 26

Team Scoring Records:

- New Orleans Saints- 1,318 points
- New Orleans Saints – FGs made/attempted: 302/389
- New Orleans Saints – PATs made/attempted: 412/418

Pro Bowl records:

- Most points in Pro Bowl (total) – 45 (15 points after touchdown, 10 field goals)
- Most points after touchdown in Pro Bowl (total) – 15
- Most field goal attempts in Pro Bowl (total) – 18
- Most field goals in Pro Bowl (total) – 10

Andersen holds 2nd place in the following NFL records:

- Most PATs attempted (career) – 859 (1st place: George Blanda, 959)
- Most PATs made (career) – 849 (1st place: George Blanda, 943)
- Most seasons – 25 (1st place: George Blanda, 26)
- Most seasons, 100 or more points – 14 (1st place: Jason Elam, 16)
- Most games with 5 or more field goals (career) – 9 (John Carney, 11)

== Personal life ==
Andersen became a naturalized American citizen in 2019.
