= Pat Swilling =

American gridiron football player (born 1964)

No. 56
- Positions: Linebacker, defensive end

Personal information
- Born: October 25, 1964 (age 62); Toccoa, Georgia, U.S.
- Listed height: 6 ft 3 in (1.91 m)
- Listed weight: 250 lb (113 kg)

Career information
- High school: Toccoa (GA) Stephens County
- College: Georgia Tech
- NFL draft: 1986: 3rd round, 60th overall pick

Career history
- New Orleans Saints (1986–1992); Detroit Lions (1993–1994); Oakland Raiders (1995–1996, 1998)

Awards and highlights
- NFL Defensive Player of the Year (1991); 2× First-team All-Pro (1991, 1992); 2× Second-team All-Pro (1989, 1990); 5× Pro Bowl (1989–1993); NFL sacks leader (1991); New Orleans Saints Hall of Fame; First-team All-American (1985); First-team All-ACC (1985)

Career NFL statistics
- Tackles: 490
- Sacks: 107.5
- Interceptions: 6
- Stats at Pro Football Reference
- College Football Hall of Fame

Patrick Travis Swilling (born October 25, 1964) is an American former professional football player who was a linebacker in the National Football League (NFL). He played for the New Orleans Saints, Detroit Lions, and the Oakland Raiders. He had five Pro Bowl appearances in his NFL career and was the Associated Press (AP) NFL Defensive Player of the Year in 1991. He served from 2001 to 2004 as a member of the Louisiana House of Representatives.

== College career ==
Swilling played for the Georgia Tech Yellow Jackets. He set the NCAA record for sacks in a game, with seven against North Carolina State and the Georgia Tech mark for sacks in a season (15). Voted first-team All-America in 1985, Swilling left Georgia Tech as the all-time sack leader and now ranks 5th.

== Professional career ==
The New Orleans Saints drafted Swilling in the third round of the 1986 NFL Draft. The Saints fielded fierce defenses in 1991 and 1992, led by the best linebacker unit in the history of the league. In 1991, he had 17 sacks and was named NFL Defensive Player of the Year. In 1992, linebackers Rickey Jackson, Vaughan Johnson, Sam Mills, and Swilling, also known as the Dome Patrol, all played in the Pro Bowl, and the Saints led the league in quarterback sacks. Despite its tenacious defense, the team lost in the first round each time it made the playoffs during this time.

Swilling was traded to the Detroit Lions in 1993 for draft picks. In order to sign him, Detroit had to "unretire" the legendary Joe Schmidt’s number 56. In his first year with Detroit he made it to his fifth and final Pro Bowl. The Detroit Lions qualified for the playoffs in both of Swilling's seasons with the team, being eliminated each time, in the first round, by the Green Bay Packers. He signed as a free agent with the then-Los Angeles Raiders in April of 1995, prior to the franchise's return to Oakland later that year. Swilling played as a defensive end in three of the next four seasons for the Raiders, starting every game before retiring after the 1996 season. After a season away, he returned to Oakland for one more season and finished his professional career with 107.5 sacks.

Swilling was on the losing side of all six playoff games he played in; no other player in NFL history has more losses in the postseason without a win.

== NFL career statistics ==
Legend
	NFL Defensive Player of the Year
	Led the league
**Bold**	Career high

=== Regular season ===
Year	Team	Games		Tackles				Interceptions			Fumbles	
Year	Team	GP	GS	Cmb	Solo	Ast	Sck	Int	Yds	TD	FF	FR
1986	NO	16	0	26	–	–	4.0	0	0	0	0	0
1987	NO	12	12	49	–	–	10.5	1	10	0	3	**3**
1988	NO	15	14	51	–	–	7.0	0	0	0	3	1
1989	NO	16	15	56	–	–	16.5	1	14	0	5	1
1990	NO	16	16	**63**	–	–	11.0	0	0	0	4	0
1991	NO	16	16	60	–	–	**17.0**	1	**39**	**1**	**6**	1
1992	NO	16	16	49	–	–	10.5	0	0	0	3	1
1993	DET	14	14	29	–	–	6.5	**3**	16	0	5	1
1994	DET	16	7	28	21	**7**	3.5	0	0	0	0	1
1995	OAK	16	16	36	**31**	5	13.0	0	0	0	5	0
1996	OAK	16	16	26	21	5	6.0	0	0	0	2	1
1998	OAK	16	0	17	12	5	2.0	0	0	0	0	1
Career		185	142	490	85	22	107.5	6	79	1	36	11

== Personal life ==
Following the end of his professional football career, Swilling entered the real estate business and is currently a developer in New Orleans. In 2001, he won a special election as a Democrat to the Louisiana House for District 100 in New Orleans. He served for three years with assignments on the House Education, Retirement, and Transportation committees. He lost his bid for a full term as representative in the 2003 runoff election to fellow Democrat Austin Badon, who polled 6,688 votes (53.3 percent) to Swilling's 5,851 (46.7 percent).

In 2000, Swilling was inducted into the New Orleans Saints Hall of Fame along with fellow Dome Patrol member Vaughan Johnson. On April 30, 2009, Swilling was elected to the College Football Hall of Fame. His eldest son and namesake Pat Swilling Jr. signed to play basketball at the University of Tulsa on May 24, 2012. Two of his sons, Bruce Jordan-Swilling and Tre Swilling, followed in their father's footsteps and played football for Georgia Tech, with Bruce playing linebacker and Tre playing defensive back. Tre Swilling went on to play in the NFL for the San Francisco 49ers and New York Jets.

Political offices
Preceded by Cynthia Willard-Lewis	Louisiana State Representative for District 100 (Orleans Parish); 2001–2004	Succeeded by Austin Badon
