= 1993 Pro Bowl =

National Football League all-star game

1993 NFL Pro Bowl
AFC	NFC
23	20
Head coach: Don Shula (Miami Dolphins)	Head coach: George Seifert (San Francisco 49ers)
	1	2	3	4	OT	Total
AFC	0	10	3	7	3	23
NFC	3	10	0	7	0	20
- Date: February 7, 1993
- Stadium: Aloha Stadium; Honolulu, Hawaii
- MVP: Steve Tasker (Buffalo Bills)
- Referee: Howard Roe
- Attendance: 50,007

Ceremonies
- Halftime show: Randy Travis

TV in the United States
- Network: ESPN
- Announcers: Mike Patrick and Joe Theismann

The 1993 Pro Bowl was the NFL's all-star game for the 1992 season. The game was played on February 7, 1993, at Aloha Stadium in Honolulu, Hawaii. The final score was AFC — 23, NFC — 20. Steve Tasker of the Buffalo Bills was the game's MVP. This was the first Pro Bowl to go into overtime. All four starting linebackers of the New Orleans Saints, who were collectively nicknamed the Dome Patrol, were part of the NFC squad. The Dome Patrol consisted of Rickey Jackson, Sam Mills, Vaughan Johnson, and Pat Swilling. The game's referee was Howard Roe.

== Game summary ==
Nick Lowery's 33-yard field goal 4:09 into the extra period gave the AFC a 23–20 victory in the annual pro football all star game. The AFC won despite being dominated by the NFC in first downs 30–9, and in total yards gained 471–114. The AFC was able to capitalize on 6 forced turnovers, two blocked field goals (one of which was returned for a touchdown), and an interception that was taken back for six points. Special teams ace Steve Tasker of the AFC Champion Buffalo Bills was named the player of the game for making four tackles, forcing a fumble and blocking a field goal. His block came at a crucial point with just 8 minutes left and the game tied at 13. Los Angeles Raiders Terry McDaniel scooped up the ball and raced 28 yards to give the AFC a 20–13 lead. The NFC however rallied behind San Francisco 49ers quarterback Steve Young, whose fourth down 23-yard touchdown pass to New York Giants running back Rodney Hampton tied the game with just 10 seconds left. Steve Young was 18 of 32 passes for 196 yards but was also sacked 3 times and lost a fumble in overtime. Howie Long of the Raiders fell on the ball setting up the game-winning field goal.

Halftime entertainment was provided by Randy Travis as he sang his song Heroes and Friends.

== Scoring summary ==
AFC 0 10 3 7 3 23

NFC 3 10 0 7 0 20

NFC 1st: FG Morten Andersen 27 yards 3–0 NFC

AFC 2nd: Junior Seau 31 Int Return (Nick Lowery Kick) 7–3 AFC

NFC 2nd: FG Morten Andersen 37 yards 6–7 AFC

NFC 2nd: Michael Irvin 9 pass from Troy Aikman (Morten Andersen Kick) 13–7 NFC

AFC 2nd: FG Nick Lowery 42 yards 13–10 NFC

AFC 3rd: FG Nick Lowery 29 yards 13–13

AFC 4th: Terry McDaniel 28-yard blocked FG return (Nick Lowery Kick) 20–13 AFC

NFC 4th: Rodney Hampton 23 pass from Steve Young (Morten Andersen Kick) 20–20

AFC OT: Nick Lowery 33 FG 23–20 AFC

== AFC roster ==
=== Offense ===
Position	Starter(s)	Reserve(s)
Quarterback	13 Dan Marino, Miami	1 Warren Moon, Houston; 12 Jim Kelly, Buffalo; 14 Neil O'Donnell, Pittsburgh
Running back	29 Barry Foster, Pittsburgh	28 Harold Green, Cincinnati; 33 Ronnie Harmon, San Diego; 34 Thurman Thomas, Buffalo; 44 Lorenzo White, Houston
Wide receiver	83 Anthony Miller, San Diego; 84 Haywood Jeffires, Houston	80 Curtis Duncan, Houston; 83 Andre Reed, Buffalo,
Tight end	88 Keith Jackson, Miami	81 Shannon Sharpe, Denver 85 Marv Cook, New England
Offensive tackle	75 Howard Ballard, Buffalo; 78 Richmond Webb, Miami	69 Will Wolford, Buffalo; 76 John Alt, Kansas City
Offensive guard	63 Mike Munchak, Houston; 76 Steve Wisniewski, L. A. Raiders	51 Jim Richter, Buffalo; 77 Carlton Haselrig, Pittsburgh
Center	74 Bruce Matthews, Houston	63 Dermontti Dawson, Pittsburgh

=== Defense ===
Position	Starter(s)	Reserve(s)
Defensive end	78 Bruce Smith, Buffalo; 91 Leslie O'Neal, San Diego	75 Howie Long, L. A. Raiders; 90 Neil Smith, Kansas City
Defensive tackle	96 Cortez Kennedy, Seattle	79 Ray Childress, Houston
Outside linebacker	58 Derrick Thomas, Kansas City 97 Cornelius Bennett, Buffalo	51 Bryan Cox, Miami; 95 Greg Lloyd, Pittsburgh
Inside linebacker	55 Junior Seau, San Diego	54 Al Smith, Houston 56 Michael Brooks, Denver
Cornerback	22 Gill Byrd, San Diego; 26 Rod Woodson, Pittsburgh	36 Terry McDaniel, L.A. Raiders
Free safety	27 Steve Atwater, Denver	41 Eugene Robinson, Seattle
Strong safety	42 Henry Jones, Buffalo	None

=== Special teams ===
Position	Starter(s)	Reserve(s)
Punter	3 Rohn Stark, Indianapolis	None
Placekicker	8 Nick Lowery, Kansas City	None
Kick returner	83 Clarence Verdin, Indianapolis	None
Special teamer	89 Steve Tasker, Buffalo	None

== NFC roster ==
=== Offense ===
Position	Starter(s)	Reserve(s)
Quarterback	8 Steve Young, San Francisco	4 Brett Favre, Green Bay 8 Troy Aikman, Dallas
Running back	22 Emmitt Smith, Dallas	20 Barry Sanders, Detroit; 27 Rodney Hampton, N.Y. Giants; 32 Ricky Watters, San Francisco
Wide receiver	80 Jerry Rice, San Francisco; 84 Sterling Sharpe, Green Bay	80 Andre Rison, Atlanta; 86 Fred Barnett, Philadelphia 88 Michael Irvin, Dallas
Tight end	84 Jay Novacek, Dallas	84 Brent Jones, San Francisco
Offensive tackle	74 Steve Wallace, San Francisco 75 Lomas Brown, Detroit	65 Gary Zimmerman, Minnesota
Offensive guard	62 Guy McIntyre, San Francisco 64 Randall McDaniel, Minnesota	61 Nate Newton, Dallas
Center	53 Mark Stepnoski, Dallas	61 Joel Hilgenberg, New Orleans

=== Defense ===
Position	Starter(s)	Reserve(s)
Defensive end	56 Chris Doleman, Minnesota; 96 Clyde Simmons, Philadelphia	78 Pierce Holt, San Francisco; 92 Reggie White, Philadelphia
Defensive tackle	97 Henry Thomas, Minnesota	None
Outside linebacker	56 Pat Swilling, New Orleans; 58 Wilber Marshall, Washington	57 Rickey Jackson, New Orleans
Inside linebacker	50 Mike Singletary, Chicago	51 Sam Mills, New Orleans; 53 Vaughan Johnson, New Orleans 58 Jessie Tuggle, Atlanta
Cornerback	21 Deion Sanders, Atlanta 26 Audray McMillian, Minnesota	21 Eric Allen, Philadelphia; 40 Robert Massey, Phoenix
Free safety	26 Chuck Cecil, Green Bay	None
Strong safety	46 Tim McDonald, Phoenix	38 Todd Scott, Minnesota

=== Special teams ===
Position	Starter(s)	Reserve(s)
Punter	3 Rich Camarillo, Phoenix	None
Placekicker	7 Morten Andersen, New Orleans	None
Kick returner	23 Mel Gray, Detroit	20 Johnny Bailey, Phoenix
Special teamer	37 Elbert Shelley, Atlanta	None
