= 1992 All-Pro Team =

Official list of the best NFL players in 1992

The 1992 All-Pro Team is composed of the National Football League players that were named to the Associated Press, Newspaper Enterprise Association, Pro Football Writers Association, and The Sporting News All-Pro Teams in 1992. Both first and second teams are listed for the AP and NEA teams. These are the four teams that are included in Total Football II: The Official Encyclopedia of the National Football League. In 1992, the Pro Football Writers Association and Pro Football Weekly combined their All-pro teams, a practice which continues through 2008.

== Teams ==
Offense
| Position | First team | Second team |
|---|---|---|
| Quarterback | Steve Young, San Francisco 49ers (AP, NEA, PFWA, TSN) | Randall Cunningham, Philadelphia Eagles (AP-2t); Jim Kelly, Buffalo Bills (AP-2t); Dan Marino, Miami Dolphins (NEA-2) |
| Running back | Barry Foster, Pittsburgh Steelers (AP, NEA, PFWA, TSN); Emmitt Smith, Dallas Cowboys (AP, NEA, PFWA, TSN) | Barry Sanders, Detroit Lions (AP-2, NEA-2); Thurman Thomas, Buffalo Bills (AP-2, NEA-2) |
| Wide receiver | Jerry Rice, San Francisco 49ers (AP, NEA, PFWA, TSN); Sterling Sharpe, Green Bay Packers (AP, NEA, PFWA, TSN) | Andre Rison, Atlanta Falcons (AP-2, NEA-2); Michael Irvin, Dallas Cowboys (AP-2, NEA-2) |
| Tight end | Jay Novacek, Dallas Cowboys (AP, PFWA); Brent Jones, San Francisco 49ers (NEA); Keith Jackson, Miami Dolphins (TSN) | Jackie Harris, Green Bay Packers (NEA-2); Keith Jackson, Miami Dolphins (AP-2) |
| Tackle | Harris Barton, San Francisco 49ers (AP, PFWA); Richmond Webb, Miami Dolphins (AP, TSN); Paul Gruber, Tampa Bay Buccaneers (NEA); Steve Wallace, San Francisco 49ers (PFWA); Gary Zimmerman, Minnesota Vikings (NEA); Lomas Brown, Detroit Lions (TSN) | Will Wolford, Buffalo Bills (NEA-2); Paul Gruber, Tampa Bay Buccaneers (AP-2); Harris Barton, San Francisco 49ers (NEA-2); Steve Wallace, San Francisco 49ers (AP-2) |
| Guard | Randall McDaniel, Minnesota Vikings (AP, NEA, PFWA, TSN); Steve Wisniewski, Los Angeles Raiders (AP, PFWA, TSN) | Mike Munchak, Houston Oilers (AP-2); Guy McIntyre, San Francisco 49ers (AP-2); Dave Richards, San Diego Chargers (NEA-2); Derek Kennard, New Orleans Saints (NEA-2) |
| Center | Bruce Matthews, Houston Oilers (AP, PFWA, TSN, NEA-G); Mark Stepnoski, Dallas Cowboys (NEA) | Kirk Lowdermilk, Minnesota Vikings (NEA-2); Mark Stepnoski, Dallas Cowboys (AP-2) |

Special teams
| Position | First team | Second team |
|---|---|---|
| Kicker | Pete Stoyanovich, Miami Dolphins (AP, TSN); Morten Andersen, New Orleans Saints (NEA, PFWA) | Morten Andersen, New Orleans Saints (AP-2); Pete Stoyanovich, Miami Dolphins (NEA-2) |
| Punter | Rich Camarillo, Phoenix Cardinals (AP, PFWA); Rohn Stark, Indianapolis Colts (NEA, TSN) | Rohn Stark, Indianapolis Colts (AP-2); Rich Camarillo, Phoenix Cardinals (NEA-2) |
| Kick Returner | Deion Sanders, Atlanta Falcons (AP, PFWA, TSN); Mel Gray, Detroit Lions (NEA) | Vai Sikahema, Philadelphia Eagles (NEA-2); Mel Gray, Detroit Lions (AP-2) |
| Punt Returner | Kelvin Martin, Dallas Cowboys (PFWA); Mel Gray, Detroit Lions (TSN) | |
| Special Teams | Steve Tasker, Buffalo Bills (PFWA) | |

Defense
| Position | First team | Second team |
|---|---|---|
| Defensive end | Clyde Simmons, Philadelphia Eagles (AP); Reggie White, Philadelphia Eagles (NEA, PFWA); Chris Doleman, Minnesota Vikings (AP, NEA, PFWA, TSN); Bruce Smith, Buffalo Bills (TSN) | Leslie O'Neal, San Diego Chargers (NEA-2); Neil Smith, Kansas City Chiefs (NEA-2t); Bruce Smith, Buffalo Bills (AP-2, NEA-2t); Reggie White, Philadelphia Eagles (AP-2) |
| Defensive tackle | Ray Childress, Houston Oilers (AP, NEA, PFWA); Cortez Kennedy, Seattle Seahawks (AP, NEA, PFWA); Michael Dean Perry, Cleveland Browns (TSN) | Greg Kragen, Denver Broncos (AP-2); Pierce Holt, San Francisco 49ers (AP-2, NEA-2); Wayne Martin, New Orleans (NEA-2) |
| Inside linebackers | Al Smith, Houston Oilers (AP); Sam Mills, New Orleans Saints (PFWA, TSN); Junior Seau, San Diego Chargers (AP, NEA, PFWA, TSN); Cornelius Bennett, Buffalo Bills (NEA) | Chris Spielman, Detroit Lions (AP-2); Byron Evans, Philadelphia Eagles (NEA-2); Sam Mills, New Orleans Saints (AP-2); Al Smith, Houston Oilers (NEA-2) |
| Outside linebacker | Pat Swilling, New Orleans Saints (AP, TSN); Wilber Marshall, Washington Redskins (AP, NEA, PFWA); Derrick Thomas, Kansas City Chiefs (NEA, TSN); Rickey Jackson, New Orleans Saints (PFWA) | Seth Joyner, Philadelphia Eagles (AP-2, NEA-2); Rickey Jackson, New Orleans Saints (AP-2, NEA-2) |
| Cornerback | Rod Woodson, Pittsburgh Steelers (AP, NEA, PFWA, TSN); Deion Sanders, Atlanta Falcons (NEA, TSN); Audray McMillian, Minnesota Vikings (AP, PFWA) | Deion Sanders, Atlanta Falcons (AP-2); Terry McDaniel, Los Angeles Raiders (NEA-2); Carl Lee, Minnesota Vikings (NEA-2); Gill Byrd, San Diego Chargers (AP-2) |
| Safety | Henry Jones, Buffalo Bills (AP, PFWA, TSN); Steve Atwater, Denver Broncos (AP, NEA, PFWA, TSN); Tim McDonald, Phoenix Cardinals (NEA) | Tim McDonald, Phoenix Cardinals (AP-2); Carnell Lake, Pittsburgh Steelers (NEA-2); Bennie Blades, Detroit Lions (NEA-2); Louis Oliver, Miami Dolphins (AP-2) |

== Key ==
- AP = Associated Press first-team All-Pro
- AP-2 = Associated Press second-team All-Pro
- AP-2t = Tied for second-team All-Pro in the AP vote
- NEA = Newspaper Enterprise Association first-team All-Pro team
- NEA-2 = Newspaper Enterprise Association second-team All-Pro team
- NEA-2t = Tied for second-team All-Pro in the NEA vote
- PFWA = Pro Football Writers Association All-NFL
- TSN = The Sporting News All-Pro
