= Reggie Jones (cornerback, born 1969) =

American football player (born 1969)

No. 27
- Position: Cornerback

Personal information
- Born: January 11, 1969 (age 57); Memphis, Tennessee, U.S.
- Listed height: 6 ft 1 in (1.85 m)
- Listed weight: 202 lb (92 kg)

Career information
- High school: West Memphis (AR)
- College: Arkansas; Memphis
- NFL draft: 1991: 5th round, 126th overall pick

Career history
- New Orleans Saints (1991–1994); Cleveland Browns (1994)

Career NFL statistics
- Tackles: 116
- Sacks: 1
- Interceptions: 6
- Touchdowns: 1
- Stats at Pro Football Reference

Reginald Moore Jones (born January 11, 1969) is an American former professional football player who was a cornerback for four seasons for the New Orleans Saints and one year with the Cleveland Browns in the National Football League (NFL). He was selected by the Saints in the fifth round of the 1991 NFL draft.
