= Dome Patrol =

Group of 1980s and 1990s New Orleans Saints NFL players

- Formation: 1986–1992
- Members: Rickey Jackson; Vaughan Johnson; Sam Mills; Pat Swilling
- Parent organization: New Orleans Saints

The Dome Patrol was the linebacker corps of the National Football League's New Orleans Saints during the late 1980s and early 1990s. Under head coach Jim Mora, it formed the second level of defensive coordinator Steve Sidwell's 3–4 defense, considered to be among the most formidable 3–4 defenses in NFL history.

As a unit, all four players were on the Saints roster for seven seasons, from 1986 to 1992, and the players combined for 19 Pro Bowls while with the team. All four linebackers were invited to the Pro Bowl for 1992, the only time four linebackers from one team have made a Pro Bowl together.

== History ==
Rickey Jackson was drafted by the Saints in the second round of the 1981 NFL draft. He was the first member of the unit; he played five seasons and was invited to three Pro Bowls before the Dome Patrol was formed. The team did not have a winning record in any of those seasons. In 1985, the Saints defense gave up over 25 points per game, which was seventh worst in the league. In 1986, the Saints selected outside linebacker Pat Swilling in the third round of the draft and acquired middle linebackers Vaughan Johnson and Sam Mills from the recently folded United States Football League (USFL). Also arriving from the USFL was head coach Jim Mora. The defense improved to seventh best in points allowed per game in 1986, allowing an average of 17.9 points. In 1987, the team finished with a 12–3 record, (Note: The 1987 NFL season was shortened by one game due to a players' strike by the NFLPA.) posting the first winning record in franchise history as well as its first playoff appearance. The Saints ranked fourth in points allowed per game in 1988 and went 10–6, but missed the playoffs after finishing third in a strong NFC West division.

The team made the playoffs three straight seasons from 1990 to 1992. Three members of the Dome Patrol were named to the Pro Bowl in 1991, and Swilling was named the Associated Press NFL Defensive Player of the Year after leading the league with 17 sacks and forcing six fumbles. The Saints defense surrendered the fewest points of any defense in the league that season and forced the most turnovers. In week three of the season, the Saints defense held the Los Angeles Rams to 120 yards and six first downs, and recorded five sacks in a 24–7 win. "The Dome Patrol really rolled today," said Swilling after the game. "Sam Mills, Rickey Jackson, Vaughan Johnson and me. We got it on, didn't we?" The 1991 season also saw the Saints win their first division title, as they finished first in the NFC West.

All four members were invited to the Pro Bowl for 1992. This remains the only time in NFL history that four linebackers from the same team have made a Pro Bowl together. Again the defense surrendered the fewest points in the league, and were second in yards given up. Swilling was the first to leave the Saints after the 1992 season, in a trade to the Detroit Lions, followed by Jackson and Johnson in 1993 and Mills in 1994. Overall, the Dome Patrol combined for 18 Pro Bowls and made four playoff appearances.

== Dome Patrol members ==
Member of the Pro Football Hall of Fame

Name	Pos.	Playing yrs (NFL); With Saints	Pro Bowls; With Saints	First-team All-Pro; With Saints	Second-team All-Pro; With Saints
Rickey Jackson	OLB	1981–1995; 1981–1993	6× (1983–1986, 1992, 1993); 6× (1983–1986, 1992, 1993)	–	5× (1984–1986, 1992, 1993); 5× (1984–1986, 1992, 1993)
Vaughan Johnson	MLB	1986–1994; 1986–1993	4× (1989–1992); 4× (1989–1992)	–	1x (1989); 1x (1989)
Sam Mills	MLB	1986–1997; 1986–1994	5× (1987–1988, 1991–1992, 1996); 4× (1987, 1988, 1991, 1992)	1× (1996)	2× (1991, 1992); 2× (1991, 1992)
Pat Swilling	OLB	1986–1998; 1986–1992	5× (1989–1993); 4× (1989–1992)	2× (1991, 1992); 2× (1991, 1992)	2× (1989, 1990); 2× (1989, 1990)
Simultaneous	-	1986–1994; 1986–1992	(1992) (1992)	–	–
Total	–	–	20× 18×	3× 2×	10x 10x

== Legacy ==
The Dome Patrol is frequently cited as one of the greatest defensive groups of all time, and was rated by NFL Network as the number one linebacker corps in NFL history. In 2012, all four members of the Dome Patrol were unanimously selected for the Saints 45th Anniversary Team. In 2010, Jackson became the first Saints player inducted into the Pro Football Hall of Fame. Mills later signed with the Carolina Panthers, with whom he earned a Pro Bowl trip and two All-Pro selections, and later was an assistant coach with the team. Mills died in 2005 after two years of battling intestinal cancer. His jersey number 51 is currently the only jersey retired by the Panthers, and he is the only former player in the team's Hall of Honor. In 2022, Mills was inducted into the Pro Football Hall of Fame. Swilling played six more seasons in the NFL after leaving the Saints, and made a Pro Bowl trip with the Lions in 1993. All four players are in the Saints Hall of Fame and the Louisiana Sports Hall of Fame. Jackson and Mills are members of the Pro Football Hall of Fame. Swilling and Mills are also members of the College Football Hall of Fame.

== See also ==
Similarly dominant NFL 3–4 defenses and linebacker corps:

- Big Blue Wrecking Crew
- Crunch Bunch
- Monsters of the Midway
- Orange Crush Defense
