= Sam Mills =

American football player and coach (1959–2005)

- Mills with the New Orleans Saints

No. 54, 51
- Position: Linebacker

Personal information
- Born: June 3, 1959; Neptune City, New Jersey, U.S.
- Died: April 18, 2005 (aged 45); Charlotte, North Carolina, U.S.
- Listed height: 5 ft 9 in (1.75 m)
- Listed weight: 229 lb (104 kg)

Career information
- High school: Long Branch (Long Branch, New Jersey)
- College: Montclair State (1977–1980)
- NFL draft: 1981: undrafted

Career history

Playing
- Cleveland Browns (1981)*; Toronto Argonauts (1982)*; Philadelphia / Baltimore Stars (1983–1985); New Orleans Saints (1986–1994); Carolina Panthers (1995–1997)
- * Offseason or practice squad member only

Coaching
- Carolina Panthers (1998–2004) Defensive assistant / Linebackers

Awards and highlights
- 3× First-team All-Pro (1991, 1992, 1996); 5× Pro Bowl (1987, 1988, 1991, 1992, 1996); George Halas Award (2004); Carolina Panthers Hall of Honor; Carolina Panthers No. 51 retired; New Orleans Saints Hall of Fame; New Orleans Saints Ring of Honor; 2× DIII First-team All-American (1979, 1980); USFL: 3× All-USFL (1983–1985); 2× USFL champion (1984, 1985); USFL All-Time Team

Career NFL statistics
- Total tackles: 1,265
- Sacks: 20.5
- Interceptions: 11
- Forced fumbles: 22
- Fumble recoveries: 23
- Defensive touchdowns: 4
- Stats at Pro Football Reference
- Pro Football Hall of Fame
- College Football Hall of Fame

Samuel Davis Mills Jr. (June 3, 1959 – April 18, 2005) was an American professional football player who was a linebacker for 12 seasons in the National Football League (NFL) for the New Orleans Saints and Carolina Panthers. He also played for three seasons for the Philadelphia / Baltimore Stars of the United States Football League (USFL), where he won two championships in 1984 and 1985. He was inducted into the Pro Football Hall of Fame in 2022.

== Early life ==
Sam Mills was born in Neptune City, New Jersey. While growing up in Long Branch, New Jersey, he loved to tag along with his older brother and play pickup football games with the bigger boys. Mills attended high school at Long Branch High School, where he was a standout football player and wrestler. In 1976 and 1977, he won District Championships at Long Branch as a wrestler. Long Branch High School honors him to this day by hanging his high school jersey and his NFL jersey in the school gym. Although considered a great athlete in high school, Mills' 5'9" frame did not interest college scouts.

== College career ==
Mills attended college at Montclair State College (now known as Montclair State University) and made the football squad as a walk-on. He played for Montclair State from 1977 to 1980 where he is the all-time leader in career tackles with 501, tackles in a season (142), and tackles in a game (22). He was a three-time NJAC First Team All-Star and was named the New Jersey Collegiate Writers Defensive Player of the Year for three straight seasons (1978–1980).

== Professional career ==
=== Cleveland Browns and Toronto Argonauts ===
Mills signed with the Cleveland Browns as an undrafted free agent in 1981 but was released after the conclusion of preseason. He wore number 41, one of the two times he didn't wear number 51, the other being with the Stars. In 1982, Mills signed with the Toronto Argonauts of the Canadian Football League but was released before the season.

=== Philadelphia/Baltimore Stars ===
Fred Hill, who coached Mills at Montclair State, said that many pro scouts loved his tape, but when they heard he was only 5'9", they lost interest. Conventional wisdom at the time held that middle linebackers had to be at least six feet tall to see over opposing offensive linemen and scan the field. In the same way it was after high school, Mills' lack of height held him back. After college, his Pop Warner Football coach Thomas Bevacqui Jr. was able to get Mills invited to the Cleveland Browns training camp after meeting with Browns coach Sam Rutigliano. Bevacqui told Rutigliano that Mills was the best linebacker that he had ever seen play the game. While Rutigliano admired Mills, he didn't think he had the size to play in the NFL and cut him from the team. Mills then tried out with the Canadian Football League's Toronto Argonauts but did not make the team. He found a job teaching photography and assisting the football coach at East Orange (N.J.) High School.

However, Rutigliano still liked what he had seen of Mills in camp. He called an old friend, Carl Peterson, general manager of the Philadelphia Stars of the United States Football League, and suggested that he give Mills a look. Mills made his reputation at the Stars' first training camp; as Peterson recalled years later, "he just lit it up." He quickly became known as the "Field Mouse" for his devastating speed; as Peterson put it, "he was a mouse running around a field of elephants, but the elephants wanted nothing to do with him."

In his three years with the Stars (who moved to Baltimore in 1985), Mills became one of the anchors of the Stars' feared "Doghouse Defense," During that time (wearing #54), he became known around the league for both his tenacity on the field and his leadership off it. Mills led the Stars to two USFL championships, was named to three All-USFL teams and is a member of the USFL's All-Time Team. He has been described as arguably the best defensive player (along with Reggie White) in the short history of the league.

=== New Orleans Saints ===
After the Stars won the 1985 USFL title, their head coach Jim Mora was signed on to coach the New Orleans Saints, and Mills followed his mentor. During his tenure with the Saints which began in 1986, Mills was an anchor of the defense. He was a member of the vaunted "Dome Patrol," the stellar linebacking corps that led a ferocious Saints defense in the early 1990s. Mills earned four Pro Bowl appearances with the Saints in 1987, 1988, 1991, and 1992. Mora, who coached 15 seasons in the NFL, called Mills "The best player I ever coached."

=== Carolina Panthers ===
Mills became a free agent at the end of the 1994 NFL season. The expansion Carolina Panthers offered him a two-year, $2.8 million deal. While New Orleans matched the offer, Mills was displeased that the Saints did not make an offer until the Panthers forced their hand, and opted to sign with the Panthers.

Mills became a veteran leader for the young team, the only player to start every game during the Panthers' first three seasons. In a 1995 game against the New York Jets, Mills stepped in front of a Bubby Brister shovel pass and took it 36 yards for a touchdown, sealing the Panthers' first win in franchise history. His career rebirth gave him a fifth Pro Bowl appearance in 1996 at the age of 37 which, at the time, made him the oldest defender to be invited to a Pro Bowl. He retired after the following season.

== NFL career statistics ==
Legend
	Led the league
	NFL record
**Bold**	Career high

=== Regular season ===
Year	Team	Games		Tackles				Interceptions			Fumbles	
Year	Team	GP	GS	Cmb	Solo	Ast	Sck	Int	Yds	TD	FF	FR
1986	NO	**16**	13	92	–	–	0.0	0	0	0	1	1
1987	NO	12	12	58	–	–	0.0	0	0	0	1	3
1988	NO	**16**	**16**	105	–	–	0.0	0	0	0	0	**4**
1989	NO	**16**	15	95	–	–	3.0	0	0	0	2	1
1990	NO	**16**	14	112	–	–	0.5	0	0	0	2	1
1991	NO	**16**	**16**	102	–	–	1.0	2	13	0	2	2
1992	NO	**16**	**16**	130	–	–	3.0	1	10	0	4	3
1993	NO	9	7	85	–	–	2.0	0	0	0	2	1
1994	NO	**16**	**16**	**155**	**115**	**40**	1.0	1	0	0	2	1
1995	CAR	**16**	**16**	110	86	24	4.5	**5**	**58**	**1**	**5**	**4**
1996	CAR	**16**	**16**	122	90	32	**5.5**	1	10	0	0	2
1997	CAR	**16**	**16**	99	72	27	0.0	1	18	0	1	0
Career		181	173	1,265	363	123	20.5	11	119	1	22	23

== USFL career statistics ==
Year	Team	Games		Tackles	Interceptions		
Year	Team	GP	GS	Sck	Int	Yds	TD
1983	Philadelphia/Baltimore Stars	18	18	4.5	3	13	0
1984	Philadelphia/Baltimore Stars	18	-	5.0	3	24	0
1985	Philadelphia/Baltimore Stars	18	-	5.5	3	32	1
Career		54	-	15.0	9	69	1

== Post-playing career ==
Mills played 12 seasons in the NFL and recorded 1,319 tackles, 20.5 sacks, 11 interceptions and four touchdowns while starting 173 of 181 games. Mills was named to the NFL All-Pro team three times, in 1991, 1992, and 1996. He was elected to the Louisiana Sports Hall of Fame (2001), the Greater New Orleans Sports Hall of Fame (2002), the Sports Hall of Fame of New Jersey (2003) and the New Orleans Saints Hall of Fame (1998). After retiring from play, Mills was inducted into the Carolina Panthers Hall of Honor (1998). He became a defensive coaching assistant for the Panthers in 1998, before being promoted to linebackers coach in 1999.

== Cancer and death ==
In August 2003, Mills was diagnosed with intestinal cancer. Though he was told he had only a few months to live, he was treated with chemotherapy and radiation and continued to coach. He was an inspirational force in the Panthers’ post-season run to Super Bowl XXXVIII. His plea to "keep pounding" in an emotional speech before the Panthers' victory over the Dallas Cowboys later became the name of a fund to sponsor cancer research programs and an official team slogan. He continued to coach the team until his death from cancer complications on April 18, 2005.

== Legacy ==
Mills' jersey number 51 was retired by the Panthers at the start of the 2005 NFL season, making it the first number the franchise retired. Mills was inducted into the College Football Hall of Fame in 2009, with his son Sam Mills III accepting the award on his father's behalf. Sam Mills III was the defensive line coach for the Washington Commanders.

The speech inspired the Carolina Panthers and Nike, when awarded the contract for NFL jerseys starting in the 2012 NFL season, to feature "Keep Pounding" sewn on the inside collars of Panthers jerseys for the 2012 NFL season, in honor of the elder Mills. Before the start of every home game, the Panthers have an honorary drummer bang a "Keep Pounding" drum. Though Carolina was not the designated home team for Super Bowl 50, the tradition remained a part of the game, with the drummer being Panther fan and Charlotte native Stephen Curry, the star point guard for the four-time NBA champion Golden State Warriors. Mills was elected to the Pro Football Hall of Fame in 2022.
