= Steve Sidwell (American football) =

American football coach (1944–2023)

Personal information
- Born: August 30, 1944; Winfield, Kansas, U.S.
- Died: August 23, 2023 (aged 78); Brewster, Massachusetts, U.S.

Career information
- College: Colorado

Career history
- Colorado (1966–1973) Linebackers coach; UNLV (1974–1975) Defensive coordinator; SMU (1976–1981) Defensive coordinator; New England Patriots (1982–1984) Linebackers coach; Indianapolis Colts (1985) Defensive line coach; New Orleans Saints (1986–1993) Defensive coordinator, inside linebackers coach; New Orleans Saints (1994) Defensive coordinator; Houston Oilers (1995–1996) Defensive coordinator; New England Patriots (1997–1999) Defensive coordinator; Seattle Seahawks (2000–2002) Defensive coordinator

Awards and highlights
- First-team All-Big Eight (1965); Second-team All-Big Eight (1964)
- Coaching profile at Pro Football Reference

Steve Sidwell (August 30, 1944 – August 23, 2023) was an American football coach. He coached in the National Football League (NFL) for 22 years and was a college football coach for 16 years.

Sidwell worked as the New Orleans Saints defensive coordinator from 1986 to 1994. He had been appointed on February 3, 1986, a few days after Vince Tobin joined the Chicago Bears despite the expectation that he would fill the Saints' defensive coordinator position. In this nine-year span, the Saints led the league twice in fewest points allowed (1991, 1992), in rushing defense (1989) and in passing defense (1992, 1993); this era of Saints defenses was nicknamed the Dome Patrol. He has also held jobs as defensive coordinator of the Houston Oilers, Indianapolis Colts, New England Patriots, and most recently, the Seattle Seahawks.

Sidwell died on August 23, 2023, at the age of 78.
