= Rickey Jackson =

American football player (born 1958)

No. 57
- Position: Linebacker

Personal information
- Born: March 20, 1958 (age 68); Pahokee, Florida, U.S.
- Listed height: 6 ft 2 in (1.88 m)
- Listed weight: 243 lb (110 kg)

Career information
- High school: Pahokee
- College: Pittsburgh (1977–1980)
- NFL draft: 1981: 2nd round, 51st overall pick

Career history
- New Orleans Saints (1981–1993); San Francisco 49ers (1994–1995)

Awards and highlights
- Super Bowl champion (XXIX); 5× Second-team All-Pro (1984–1986, 1992, 1993); 6× Pro Bowl (1983–1986, 1992, 1993); New Orleans Saints Hall of Fame; New Orleans Saints Ring of Honor; New Orleans Saints 45th Anniversary Team; Second-team All-American (1980); First-team All-East (1980); Second-team All-East (1979)

Career NFL statistics
- Tackles: 1,173
- Sacks: 128
- Interceptions: 8
- Forced fumbles: 40
- Stats at Pro Football Reference
- Pro Football Hall of Fame

Rickey Anderson Jackson (born March 20, 1958) is an American former professional football player who was a linebacker in the National Football League (NFL) for the New Orleans Saints (1981–1993) and the San Francisco 49ers (1994–1995). He led the team's Dome Patrol linebacker corps while playing with the Saints. In 1997, Jackson was inducted into the New Orleans Saints Hall of Fame. Jackson won a Super Bowl ring with the 49ers in Super Bowl XXIX one year before retiring. On February 7, 2010, Jackson was elected to the Pro Football Hall of Fame, the same day his New Orleans Saints won Super Bowl XLIV.

== Early life ==
Jackson's first name was originally spelled "Ricky"; he says he changed it himself in high school. He played football and basketball at Pahokee High School in Pahokee, Florida. He made 188 tackles and caught 21 passes for eight touchdowns as a tight end. In 2007, he was named to the Florida High School Athletic Association's All-Century Team, consisting of the top 33 players in the 100-year history of high school football in Florida. Jackson's nickname, "City Champ", came from his days at Pahokee; he has variously said that he chose the name himself or was given it because of his performance on the field.

== College career ==
Jackson was known as "the other end" at the University of Pittsburgh due to Hugh Green's presence on the team. He also played with other future NFL players including center Russ Grimm, guard Mark May, tackle Jimbo Covert, defensive back Tim Lewis, defensive lineman Bill Maas, receiver Dwight Collins, and quarterback Dan Marino. Although overshadowed by Green, as a junior in 1979 Jackson was a second-team All-East selection and named an honorable mention All-American by the Associated Press and The Sporting News. As a senior in 1980, he was a second-team All-American selection and a first-team All-Big East selection. Pitt's defense was ranked number one nationally in 1980.

Jackson ended his college career with 290 tackles, 166 of them unassisted. He also finished with 21 sacks, four passes defended and three interceptions. As a freshman, he had 15 tackles and two interceptions, one returned for a touchdown. As a sophomore, he made 27 tackles (21 unassisted) and five sacks. In 1979, he had 111 tackles (47 unassisted) and four sacks and recovered two fumbles. In 1980, he led the team with 137 tackles (87 solo), had 12 sacks, broke up four passes, recovered four fumbles and intercepted a pass. Following a game against Army in 1980, in which Jackson recorded 12 tackles, three sacks, a forced fumble, an interception, and a blocked punt, he was named the Sports Illustrated Player of the Week. In the same year during the game against Penn State, he was chosen the ABC/Chevrolet Player-of-the-Game.

Jackson made 14 tackles in the Pittsburgh Gator Bowl win and played in the Senior Bowl; he was a team captain. He was the MVP of the East-West Shrine Game. In 2022, he was inducted into the Athletics Hall of Fame. On April 30, 2023, Jackson graduated from Pitt's College of General Studies with his Bachelor of Arts in social sciences.

== Professional career ==
Selected in the second round of the 1981 NFL draft (53rd overall) from Pitt, Jackson was a member of the first draft in New Orleans under head coach Bum Phillips. He played in all 16 games his rookie season and was named to the NFL All-Rookie team. In 1983, he was first-team All-NFC, the first of seven seasons in which he would receive post-season honors in the NFL, including being selected six times for the Pro Bowl (in 1983, 1984, 1985, 1986, 1992, and 1993). Jackson was a four-time first-team All-Pro and a two-time second-team All-Pro selection. He was a member of the Saints' famed "Dome Patrol", a four-man linebacking corps named by the NFL Network as the best in NFL history.

In his 13 seasons as a Saint, Jackson missed only two games, a result of an automobile accident in 1989. He played the remainder of the 1989 season with his jaw wired and wearing a special helmet, still managing to accumulate 7 1/2 sacks during the year.

In 1994, Jackson joined the 49ers. He won his only Super Bowl with the 49ers that year. He retired from the NFL following the 1995 season.

Jackson recorded 10 or more sacks in six different seasons and led the NFL in fumble recoveries in 1990 and 1991. He finished his career with 136 (eight unofficial in 1981) sacks and eight interceptions, which he returned for 68 yards. In his first year as a finalist in 2010, Jackson was elected to the Pro Football Hall of Fame, one day before the Saints won Super Bowl XLIV. His bust was sculpted by Scott Myers and unveiled at the Enshrinement Ceremony on August 7, 2010. He is the first member of the Hall of Fame to be inducted primarily for his contributions as a Saint.

=== Records ===
On his retirement following the 1995 season, Jackson held the following NFL records.

- Second: Most Opponents Fumbles Recovered, Career – 28
- Third: Most Sacks, Career – 128.0
- Tied for third: Most Opponents' Fumbles Recovered, Season – 7 (1990)

At the end of the 1993 season, his final season with New Orleans, Jackson held the following Saints records.

- First: Most Games – 195
- First: Most Sacks, Career – 123.0 (includes unofficial 8.0 sacks in 1981)
- Tied for first: Most Seasons – 13
- First: Most Opponents Fumbles Recovered, Career – 26
- First: Most Opponents Fumbles Recovered, Season – 7 (1990)
- Tied for first: Most Sacks, Game – 4 (at Atlanta, December 14, 1986; at Detroit, September 18, 1988)

== NFL career statistics ==
Legend
	Won the Super Bowl
	Led the league
**Bold**	Career high

Year	Team	Games		Tackles				Interceptions			Fumbles	
Year	Team	GP	GS	Cmb	Solo	Ast	Sck	Int	Yds	TD	FF	FR
1981	NO	16	16	**125**	–	–	8.0	0	0	0	2	1
1982	NO	9	9	47	–	–	4.5	1	**32**	0	1	2
1983	NO	16	16	102	–	–	12.0	1	0	0	0	2
1984	NO	16	16	124	–	–	12.0	1	14	0	4	4
1985	NO	16	16	107	–	–	11.0	0	0	0	0	0
1986	NO	16	16	114	–	–	9.0	1	1	0	**6**	1
1987	NO	12	12	74	–	–	9.5	**2**	4	0	3	0
1988	NO	16	16	92	–	–	7.0	1	16	0	2	0
1989	NO	14	14	47	–	–	7.5	0	0	0	3	0
1990	NO	16	16	68	–	–	6.0	0	0	0	4	**7**
1991	NO	16	16	59	–	–	11.5	0	0	0	3	4
1992	NO	16	16	66	–	–	**13.5**	0	0	0	**6**	3
1993	NO	16	16	79	–	–	11.5	0	0	0	4	3
1994	SF	16	14	40	**37**	3	3.5	0	0	0	2	2
1995	SF	16	15	36	32	**4**	9.5	1	1	0	0	0
Career		227	224	1,180	69	7	136.0	8	68	0	40	29
