= Vaughan Johnson =

American football player (1962–2019)

No. 53, 52
- Position: Linebacker

Personal information
- Born: March 24, 1962; Morehead City, North Carolina, U.S.
- Died: December 12, 2019 (aged 57); North Carolina, U.S.
- Listed height: 6 ft 3 in (1.91 m)
- Listed weight: 235 lb (107 kg)

Career information
- High school: West Carteret (Morehead City)
- College: NC State
- Supplemental draft: 1984: 1 / Pick: 15th round

Career history
- Jacksonville Bulls (1984–1985); New Orleans Saints (1986–1993); Philadelphia Eagles (1994)

Awards and highlights
- Second-team All-Pro (1989); 4× Pro Bowl (1989–1992); New Orleans Saints Hall of Fame; First-team All-American (1983); First-team All-ACC (1983)

Career NFL statistics
- Total tackles: 669
- Sacks: 12.0
- Interceptions: 4
- Forced fumbles: 11
- Stats at Pro Football Reference

Vaughan Monroe Johnson (March 24, 1962 – December 12, 2019) was an American professional football player who was a linebacker in the National Football League (NFL) for the New Orleans Saints and Philadelphia Eagles. He also was a member of the Jacksonville Bulls in the United States Football League (USFL). He played college football for the NC State Wolfpack.

== Early life ==
Johnson was born and raised in Morehead City, North Carolina and played scholastically at West Carteret High School. He played collegiately for the North Carolina State Wolfpack, where, as a senior, he was honored by The Sporting News as a first-team All-American.

== Professional career ==
Johnson was selected by the Jacksonville Bulls in the 1984 USFL Territorial Draft, where he played the 1984 and 1985 USFL seasons.

He was also selected by the New Orleans Saints 15th overall in the 1984 NFL Supplemental Draft of USFL and CFL Players. He joined the Saints to play the 1986 NFL season after the USFL folded.

Johnson spent eight years with the Saints, starting 98 games, while collecting 12 sacks, 4 interceptions, and 5 fumble recoveries. He was a four-time Pro Bowler, from 1989 to 1992, while with the Saints and also a member of the vaunted Dome Patrol linebacker corps.

Johnson finished his career with the Philadelphia Eagles in 1994, appearing in four games.

In 2000, he was enshrined in the Saints Hall of Fame, and in 2011, he was selected for the Louisiana Sports Hall of Fame.

== Death ==
Johnson died from kidney disease on December 12, 2019, at age 57. He was posthumously diagnosed with chronic traumatic encephalopathy (CTE).

== NFL career statistics ==
Year	Team	Games		Tackles					Interceptions			Fumbles		
Year	Team	GP	GS	Cmb	Solo	Ast	Sck	Sfty	Int	Yds	TD	FF	FR	Yds
1986	NOR	16	0	33	33	0	1.0	0	1	15	0	0	1	0
1987	NOR	12	12	87	87	0	1.0	0	1	0	0	2	1	0
1988	NOR	16	16	114	114	0	2.0	0	1	34	0	0	0	0
1989	NOR	16	16	83	83	0	1.0	0	0	0	0	0	1	-1
1990	NOR	16	16	103	103	0	1.0	0	0	0	0	2	1	0
1991	NOR	13	11	50	50	0	0.0	0	1	19	0	0	1	0
1992	NOR	16	14	84	84	0	1.0	0	0	0	0	3	0	0
1993	NOR	15	13	110	110	0	5.0	0	0	0	0	4	0	0
1994	PHI	4	0	5	5	0	0.0	0	0	0	0	0	0	0
Career		124	98	669	669	0	12.0	0	4	68	0	11	5	-1

"Vaughan Johnson Stats, Height, Weight, Position, Draft, College". Pro Football Reference.
