= 1992 NFL season =

American football season

Regular season
- Duration: September 6 – December 28, 1992

Playoffs
- Start date: January 2, 1993
- AFC Champions: Buffalo Bills
- NFC Champions: Dallas Cowboys

Super Bowl XXVII
- Date: January 31, 1993
- Site: Rose Bowl, Pasadena, California
- Champions: Dallas Cowboys

Pro Bowl
- Date: February 7, 1993
- Site: Aloha Stadium

AFC teams: West, Central, East
NFC teams: West, Central, East

The 1992 NFL season was the 73rd regular season of the National Football League (NFL). Due to the damage caused by Hurricane Andrew, the New England Patriots at Miami Dolphins game that was scheduled for September 6 at Joe Robbie Stadium was rescheduled to October 18. Both teams originally had that weekend off. This marked the first time since the 1966 NFL season and the AFL seasons of 1966 and 1967 that there were byes in week 1.

The season ended with Super Bowl XXVII when the Dallas Cowboys defeated the Buffalo Bills 52–17 at the Rose Bowl. This would be the third of the Bills' four consecutive Super Bowl losses; as of 2026, no other team has ever lost more than two Super Bowls in a row. Buffalo joined the Miami Dolphins of the early 1970s as the second team to reach three straight Super Bowls (the New England Patriots of the late 2010s became the third, and subsequently, the early 2020s Kansas City Chiefs).

== Player movement ==
=== Transactions ===
- April 2, 1992, Brian Baldinger was signed in Plan B free agency by the Buffalo Bills, joining his brother Gary Baldinger.
- August 31, 1992: Brian Baldinger was released by the Buffalo Bills on August 31.

=== Trades ===
- August 13: Washington traded quarterback Stan Humphries to the San Diego Chargers
- August 27: The San Francisco 49ers traded Pro Bowl Defensive End Charles Haley to the Dallas Cowboys.
- August 28: The Chicago Bears trade offensive lineman Jay Hilgenberg to the Cleveland Browns
- September 1: The defending AFC Champion Buffalo Bills trade Defensive Tackle Leon Seals to the Philadelphia Eagles.
- September 12: The Atlanta Falcons trade wide receiver Shawn Collins to the Cleveland Browns.
- September 21: The Pittsburgh Steelers trade Thomas Everett to the Dallas Cowboys.

=== Draft ===
The 1992 NFL draft was held from April 26 to 27, 1992, at New York City's Marriott Marquis. With the first pick, the Indianapolis Colts selected defensive tackle Steve Emtman from the University of Washington.

== Referee changes ==
After one season as referee, Stan Kemp stepped down after he was diagnosed with Amyotrophic lateral sclerosis. Tom Dooley also retired during the off-season. Gary Lane and Ed Hochuli were then promoted to referee.

Kemp's son, Alex, became an NFL official in 2014 and was promoted to referee in 2018.

== Major rule changes ==
- The NFL ceases to use the instant replay system that was in effect since the 1986 NFL season to review questionable on-field calls, due to many reviews taking up long periods of time. Instant replay would not return to the league until a more comprehensive instant replay review system with time limits was introduced in the 1999 NFL season.
- To reduce injuries, any offensive player who is lined up in the backfield before the snap cannot chop block a defensive player who is already engaged above the waist by another offensive player.
- A maximum of six captains are allowed at midfield for the coin toss. This was in response to Atlanta Falcons coach Jerry Glanville sometimes sending out his entire squad, and Washington Redskins coach Joe Gibbs sending eight captains to midfield at Super Bowl XXVI.

== 1992 deaths ==
- Frank Akins: A selection of the Washington Redskins in the 1943 NFL draft, Akins died on July 6, 1992.
- Eric Andolsek: An offensive lineman with the Detroit Lions, Andolsek was working in the yard of his Thibodaux, Louisiana home when a semi-trailer truck ran off Louisiana Highway 1 in front of his house and struck and killed him on June 23.
- Lyle Alzado: On May 14, 1992, at age 43, Alzado died from brain cancer. He was buried at River View Cemetery in Portland, Oregon.
- Mel Branch: A starter for the Dallas Texans for the 1962 AFL Championship Game, Branch was also a charter member of the Miami Dolphins in 1966. He died on April 21, 1992
- Jerome Brown: A two-time All-Pro with the Philadelphia Eagles, Brown died on June 25, 1992, at the age of 27, following an automobile accident in Brooksville, Florida, in which both he and his 12-year-old nephew were killed when Brown lost control of his ZR1 Chevrolet Corvette at high speed and crashed into a palm tree. Brown was buried in his hometown of Brooksville.
- Shane Curry: A selection of the Indianapolis Colts in the 1991 NFL draft, Curry was shot and killed outside a Cincinnati nightclub during an argument over a blocked vehicle on May 4, 1992.
- Mike Wise: Was a backup for the Raiders before being released after a fight instigated by a teammate, and had serious injuries which made it impossible for him to resume his career. Committed suicide at his home in California.

=== Members of the Pro Football Hall of Fame ===
- Buck Buchanan: Buchanan was a defensive tackle with the Kansas City Chiefs in the American Football League (AFL) and in the National Football League (NFL), appearing in Super Bowl I and Super Bowl IV. He was inducted in the Pro Football Hall of Fame in 1990.

== Preseason ==
=== American Bowl ===
A series of National Football League pre-season exhibition games that were held at sites outside the United States, a total of three games were contested.

Date	Winning team	Score	Losing team	Score	Stadium	City
August 2, 1992	Houston Oilers	34	Dallas Cowboys	23	Tokyo Dome	(Japan) Tokyo
August 15, 1992	Miami Dolphins	31	Denver Broncos	27	Olympiastadion	(Germany) Berlin
August 16, 1992	San Francisco 49ers	17	Washington Redskins	15	Wembley Stadium	(United Kingdom) London

== Regular season ==
=== Scheduling formula ===
Inter-conference
AFC East vs NFC West
AFC Central vs NFC Central
AFC West vs NFC East

Highlights of the 1992 season included:

- Thanksgiving: Two games were played on Thursday, November 26, featuring Houston at Detroit and the New York Giants at Dallas, with Houston and Dallas winning.
- Week 16: The San Diego Chargers became the first and only team to start 0-4 and make the playoffs (as of 2025) and they achieve that feat by beating the Los Angeles Raiders. The Chargers won the AFC West championship the next week with a road win vs. the Seattle Seahawks.

=== Final standings ===
There was an unusual deviation between good teams and bad teams in the NFL in 1992. Only one team, the Denver Broncos; finished with eight wins and eight losses, nine teams had at least 11 wins, and eight teams had at least 11 losses. Only six teams had between seven, eight or nine wins in 1992.

AFC East
	W	L	T	PCT	DIV	CONF	PF	PA	STK
^{(2)} Miami Dolphins	11	5	0	.688	5–3	9–3	340	281	W3
^{(4)} Buffalo Bills	11	5	0	.688	5–3	7–5	381	283	L1
Indianapolis Colts	9	7	0	.563	5–3	7–7	216	302	W5
New York Jets	4	12	0	.250	3–5	4–8	220	315	L3
New England Patriots	2	14	0	.125	2–6	2–10	205	363	L5

AFC Central
	W	L	T	PCT	DIV	CONF	PF	PA	STK
^{(1)} Pittsburgh Steelers	11	5	0	.688	5–1	10–2	299	225	W1
^{(5)} Houston Oilers	10	6	0	.625	3–3	7–5	352	258	W2
Cleveland Browns	7	9	0	.438	3–3	5–7	272	275	L3
Cincinnati Bengals	5	11	0	.313	1–5	4–8	274	364	L1

AFC West
	W	L	T	PCT	DIV	CONF	PF	PA	STK
^{(3)} San Diego Chargers	11	5	0	.688	5–3	9–5	335	241	W7
^{(6)} Kansas City Chiefs	10	6	0	.625	6–2	8–4	348	282	W1
Denver Broncos	8	8	0	.500	4–4	7–5	262	329	L1
Los Angeles Raiders	7	9	0	.438	4–4	5–7	249	281	W1
Seattle Seahawks	2	14	0	.125	1–7	2–10	140	312	L4

NFC East
	W	L	T	PCT	DIV	CONF	PF	PA	STK
^{(2)} Dallas Cowboys	13	3	0	.813	6–2	9–3	409	243	W2
^{(5)} Philadelphia Eagles	11	5	0	.688	6–2	8–4	354	245	W4
^{(6)} Washington Redskins	9	7	0	.563	4–4	7–5	300	255	L2
New York Giants	6	10	0	.375	2–6	4–8	306	367	L1
Phoenix Cardinals	4	12	0	.250	2–6	4–10	243	332	L2

NFC Central
	W	L	T	PCT	DIV	CONF	PF	PA	STK
^{(3)} Minnesota Vikings	11	5	0	.688	7–1	8–4	374	249	W2
Green Bay Packers	9	7	0	.563	4–4	6–6	276	296	L1
Tampa Bay Buccaneers	5	11	0	.313	3–5	5–9	267	365	W1
Chicago Bears	5	11	0	.313	3–5	4–8	295	361	L2
Detroit Lions	5	11	0	.313	3–5	3–9	273	332	L1

NFC West
	W	L	T	PCT	DIV	CONF	PF	PA	STK
^{(1)} San Francisco 49ers	14	2	0	.875	6–0	11–1	431	236	W8
^{(4)} New Orleans Saints	12	4	0	.750	4–2	9–3	330	202	W1
Atlanta Falcons	6	10	0	.375	1–5	4–8	327	414	L2
Los Angeles Rams	6	10	0	.375	1–5	4–8	313	383	W1

=== Tiebreakers ===
- Pittsburgh was the top AFC playoff seed, and Miami was the second AFC playoff seed ahead of San Diego, based on conference record (10–2 to Dolphins' 9–3 to Chargers' 7–5).
- Miami finished ahead of Buffalo in the AFC East based on better conference record (9–3 to Bills' 7–5).
- Houston was the second AFC Wild Card based on head-to-head victory over Kansas City (1–0).
- Washington was the third NFC Wild Card based on better conference record than Green Bay (7–5 to Packers' 6–6).
- Tampa Bay finished ahead of Chicago and Detroit in the NFC Central based on better conference record (5–9 to Bears' 4–8 and Lions' 3–9).
- Atlanta finished ahead of L.A. Rams in the NFC West based on better record against common opponents (5–7 to Rams' 4–8).

== Playoffs ==
Jan 3 – Rich Stadium	Jan 9 – Three Rivers Stadium
5	Houston	38
4	Buffalo	24
4	Buffalo	41*	Jan 17 – Joe Robbie Stadium
1	Pittsburgh	3
AFC
Jan 2 – Jack Murphy Stadium	4	Buffalo	29
Jan 10 – Joe Robbie Stadium
2	Miami	10
6	Kansas City	0	AFC Championship
3	San Diego	0
3	San Diego	17	Jan 31 – Rose Bowl
2	Miami	31
Wild-card round
Divisional round
Jan 3 – Louisiana Superdome	A4	Buffalo	17
Jan 10 – Texas Stadium
N2	Dallas	52
5	Philadelphia	36	Super Bowl XXVII
5	Philadelphia	10
4	New Orleans	20	Jan 17 – Candlestick Park
2	Dallas	34
NFC
Jan 2 – Hubert H. Humphrey Metrodome	2	Dallas	30
Jan 9 – Candlestick Park
1	San Francisco	20
6	Washington	24	NFC Championship
6	Washington	13
3	Minnesota	7
1	San Francisco	20

* Indicates overtime victory.

== Awards ==
Most Valuable Player	Steve Young, quarterback, San Francisco
Coach of the Year	Bill Cowher, Pittsburgh
Offensive Player of the Year	Steve Young, quarterback, San Francisco
Defensive Player of the Year	Cortez Kennedy, defensive tackle, Seattle
Offensive Rookie of the Year	Carl Pickens, wide receiver, Cincinnati
Defensive Rookie of the Year	Dale Carter, cornerback, Kansas City
NFL Comeback Player of the Year	Randall Cunningham, quarterback, Philadelphia
NFL Man of the Year	John Elway, quarterback, Denver
Super Bowl Most Valuable Player	Troy Aikman, quarterback, Dallas

== Coaching changes ==
- Cincinnati Bengals: Dave Shula replaced the fired Sam Wyche.
- Green Bay Packers: Mike Holmgren replaced the fired Lindy Infante.
- Indianapolis Colts: Ted Marchibroda was named the permanent replacement, after Ron Meyer was fired after five games in 1991 and Rick Venturi served as interim for the final 11 games. Marchibroda had previously served as head coach of the Colts (then based in Baltimore) from 1975 to 1979.
- Los Angeles Rams: Chuck Knox replaced the fired John Robinson, having previously served as Rams head coach from 1973 to 1977.
- Minnesota Vikings: Dennis Green replaced the retired Jerry Burns.
- Pittsburgh Steelers: Bill Cowher replaced the retired Chuck Noll.
- San Diego Chargers: Bobby Ross replaced the fired Dan Henning.
- Seattle Seahawks: Tom Flores replaced Chuck Knox, who resigned to become the Rams' head coach.
- Tampa Bay Buccaneers: Sam Wyche replaced the fired Richard Williamson.

== Stadium changes ==
The Atlanta Falcons played their first season in the new Georgia Dome, replacing Atlanta–Fulton County Stadium. The Falcons would play at the Georgia Dome until 2016.

== Uniform changes ==
The Tampa Bay Buccaneers began wearing orange pants with their white jerseys.

== Television ==
This was the third year under the league's four-year broadcast contracts with ABC, CBS, NBC, TNT, and ESPN. ABC, CBS, and NBC continued to televise Monday Night Football, the NFC package, and the AFC package, respectively. Sunday night games aired on TNT during the first half of the season, and ESPN during the second half of the season. With Bill Walsh leaving NBC to become head coach of the Stanford Cardinal college football team, Bob Trumpy was named to replace him as the network's lead color commentator, alongside Dick Enberg. Gary Bender replaced Skip Caray as TNT's play-by-play announcer.
