= 1989 New Orleans Saints season =

NFL team season

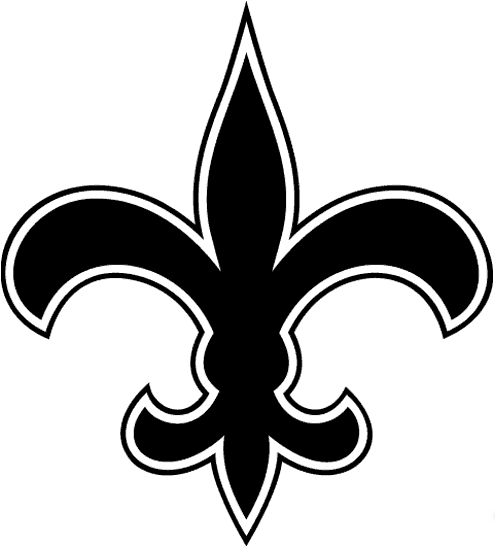
- Owner: Tom Benson
- General manager: Jim Finks
- Head coach: Jim Mora
- Home stadium: Louisiana Superdome

Results
- Record: 9–7
- Division place: 3rd NFC West
- Playoffs: Did not qualify
- Pro Bowlers: RB Dalton Hilliard; LB Pat Swilling; LB Vaughan Johnson

The 1989 New Orleans Saints season was the franchise's 23rd season in the National Football League, and their fourteenth with home games at the Superdome. They failed to improve upon their 10–6 record from 1988 and instead finished with a 9–7 record, missing the playoffs for the second consecutive season. This was the final season Brad Edelman, James Haynes, Walter Johnson, Mike Jones, Joe Kohlbrand, and Steve Korte would play in the NFL.

== Offseason ==
=== NFL draft ===
1989 New Orleans Saints draft
Round	Pick	Player	Position	College	Notes
1	19	Wayne Martin *	Defensive end	Arkansas	
2	46	Robert Massey *	Cornerback	North Carolina Central	
3	79	Kim Phillips	Defensive back	North Texas	
4	106	Michael Mayes	Defensive back	LSU	
5	133	Kevin Haverdink	Offensive tackle	Western Michigan	
6	159	Floyd Turner	Wide receiver	Northwestern State	
7	186	David Griggs	Linebacker	Virginia	
8	213	Fred Hadley	Wide receiver	Mississippi State	
9	246	Jerry Leggett	Linebacker	Cal State Fullerton	
10	273	Joe Henderson	Running back	Iowa State	
11	300	Calvin Nicholson	Defensive back	Oregon State	
12	327	Mike Cadore	Wide receiver	Eastern Kentucky	
Made roster * Made at least one Pro Bowl during career

== Personnel ==
=== Staff ===
1989 New Orleans Saints staff
Front office: Owner/general partner – Tom Benson; President/general manager – Jim Finks; Vice-president of administration – Jim Miller; Director of player personnel – Bill Kuharich; Head coaches: Head coach – Jim Mora; Offensive coaches: Offensive coordinator/quarterbacks – Carl Smith; Running backs – Jim Skipper; Wide receivers – Steve Walters; Offensive line – Paul Boudreau	Defensive coaches: Defensive coordinator – Steve Sidwell; Defensive line – John Pease; Linebackers – Vic Fangio; Defensive backs – Dom Capers; Special teams coaches: Special Teams/Tight Ends – Joe Marciano; Strength and conditioning: Strength and conditioning – Russell Paternostro

=== Roster ===
1989 New Orleans Saints roster
Quarterbacks (QB): 11 John Fourcade; 3 Bobby Hebert; 18 Dave Wilson; Running backs (RB): 32 Paul Frazier KR; 34 Craig Heyward; 21 Dalton Hilliard; 23 Buford Jordan FB; 35 Bobby Morse; Wide receivers (WR): 86 Rod Harris; 87 Lonzell Hill; 89 Mike Jones; 84 Eric Martin; 80 Brett Perriman; Tight ends (TE): 85 Hoby Brenner; 82 John Tice	Offensive linemen (OL): 67 Stan Brock T; 79 Glenn Derby T; 72 Jim Dombrowski G/T; 63 Brad Edelman G; 74 Kevin Haverdink T; 61 Joel Hilgenberg; 75 Doug Marrone G/C; 65 Steve Trapilo G; 78 Jeff Walker G; Defensive linemen (DL): 93 Wayne Martin DE; 96 Michael Simmons DE; 69 Pat Swoopes NT; 73 Frank Warren DE; 94 Jim Wilks NT	Linebackers (LB): 52 Brian Forde OLB; 57 Rickey Jackson OLB; 53 Vaughan Johnson ILB; 90 Walter Johnson ILB; 55 Joe Kohlbrand OLB; 51 Sam Mills ILB; 56 Pat Swilling OLB; Defensive backs (DB): 28 Gene Atkins; 41 Toi Cook CB; 27 Antonio Gibson SS; 24 Milton Mack CB; 40 Robert Massey CB; 39 Brett Maxie SS; 38 Calvin Nicholson CB; 37 Bennie Thompson FS; 44 Dave Waymer FS; Special teams (ST): 7 Morten Andersen K; 6 Tommy Barnhardt P	Practice squad: 71 Richard Cooper T; 12 Jason Garrett QB; 4 Dan Stryzinski P; 50 Todd Wheeler C; Reserve: 97 Jumpy Geathers DE (IR); 60 Steve Korte C (IR); 36 Rueben Mayes RB (IR); 43 Kim Phillips CB (IR); 83 Greg Scales TE (IR); 54 Alvin Toles LB (PUP); 88 Floyd Turner WR (IR); 47 active, 7 inactive, 4 practice squad Rookies in italics

== Regular season ==
=== Schedule ===
Week	Date	Opponent	Result	Record	Venue	Attendance
1	September 10	Dallas Cowboys	**W** 28–0	1–0	Louisiana Superdome	66,977
2	September 17	at Green Bay Packers	**L** 34–35	1–1	Lambeau Field	55,809
3	September 24	at Tampa Bay Buccaneers	**L** 10–20	1–2	Tampa Stadium	44,053
4	October 1	Washington Redskins	**L** 14–16	1–3	Louisiana Superdome	64,358
5	October 8	San Francisco 49ers	**L** 20–24	1–4	Louisiana Superdome	60,488
6	October 15	New York Jets	**W** 29–14	2–4	Louisiana Superdome	59,521
7	October 22	at Los Angeles Rams	**W** 40–21	3–4	Anaheim Stadium	57,567
8	October 29	Atlanta Falcons	**W** 20–13	4–4	Louisiana Superdome	65,153
9	November 6	at San Francisco 49ers	**L** 13–31	4–5	Candlestick Park	60,667
10	November 12	at New England Patriots	**W** 28–24	5–5	Sullivan Stadium	47,680
11	November 19	at Atlanta Falcons	**W** 26–17	6–5	Atlanta–Fulton County Stadium	53,173
12	November 26	Los Angeles Rams	**L** 17–20 (OT)	6–6	Louisiana Superdome	64,274
13	December 3	at Detroit Lions	**L** 14–21	6–7	Pontiac Silverdome	38,550
14	December 10	at Buffalo Bills	**W** 22–19	7–7	Rich Stadium	70,037
15	December 18	Philadelphia Eagles	**W** 30–20	8–7	Louisiana Superdome	59,218
16	December 24	Indianapolis Colts	**W** 41–6	9–7	Louisiana Superdome	49,009
Note: Intra-division opponents are in **bold** text.

=== Game summaries ===
==== Week 1 ====
Team	1	2	3	4	Total
Cowboys	0	0	0	0	0
• Saints	7	14	0	7	28

- Date: September 10
- Location: Louisiana Superdome, New Orleans, Louisiana
- Game start: 12:00 p.m.
- Game attendance: 66,977
- Referee: Howard Roe
- TV announcers (CBS): Verne Lundquist and John Madden

Scoring summary
Q1	NO	Dalton Hilliard 4 yard run (Morten Andersen kick)	NO 7–0
Q2	NO	Craig Heyward 1 yard run (Morten Andersen kick)	NO 14–0
Q2	NO	Derrick Shepard 56 yard punt return (Morten Andersen kick)	NO 21–0
Q3	NO	Paul Frazier 1 yard run (Morten Andersen kick)	NO 28–0

==== Week 6 ====
Team	1	2	3	4	Total
Jets	0	7	0	7	14
• Saints	6	7	7	9	29

- Date: October 15
- Location: Louisiana Superdome, New Orleans, LA
- Game start: 4:00 p.m.
- Game weather: Indoors (dome)
- Referee: Dick Hantak
- TV announcers (NBC): Don Criqui and Ahmad Rashād

Scoring summary
Q1	NO	Andersen 42 yard field goal	NO 3–0
Q1	NO	Andersen 29 yard field goal	NO 6–0
Q2	NYJ	Hasty 34 yard interception return (Leahy kick)	NYJ 7–6
Q2	NO	Hill 3 yard pass from Hebert (Andersen kick)	NO 13–7
Q3	NO	Martin 4 yard pass from Hebert (Andersen kick)	NO 20–7
Q4	NO	Safety, holding penalty on Schreiber in end zone	NO 22–7
Q4	NO	Martin 53 yard pass from Hebert (Andersen kick)	NO 29–7
Q4	NYJ	McMillan 74 yard fumble return (Leahy kick)	NO 29–14

=== Standings ===
NFC West
	W	L	T	PCT	DIV	CONF	PF	PA	STK
^{(1)} San Francisco 49ers	14	2	0	.875	5–1	10–2	442	253	W5
^{(5)} Los Angeles Rams	11	5	0	.688	4–2	8–4	426	344	W2
New Orleans Saints	9	7	0	.563	3–3	5–7	386	301	W3
Atlanta Falcons	3	13	0	.188	0–6	1–11	279	437	L7

== Awards and records ==
- Dalton Hilliard, NFL Leader, Touchdowns, 19 TD's

=== Milestones ===
- Dalton Hilliard, 1st 1,000 yard rushing season (1,262 yards)
