= 1990 New Orleans Saints season =

NFL team season

- Owner: Tom Benson
- General manager: Jim Finks
- Head coach: Jim Mora
- Offensive coordinator: Carl Smith
- Defensive coordinator: Steve Sidwell
- Home stadium: Louisiana Superdome

Results
- Record: 8–8
- Division place: 2nd NFC West
- Playoffs: Lost Wild Card Playoffs (at Bears) 6–16
- Pro Bowlers: LB Pat Swilling; LB Vaughan Johnson; K Morten Andersen

The 1990 New Orleans Saints season was the franchise's 24th season in the National Football League, the 15th to host games at the Mercedes-Benz Superdome and the fifth under head coach Jim Mora. The team looked to improve on its 9–7 record from 1989 and make the playoffs for the second time in franchise history. The Saints did not improve on their 9–7 record, as they finished the season 8–8. However, the Saints would unexpectedly make the postseason as the final seed in the NFC after getting a win and the Cowboys losing in the final week of the regular season.

During the off-season, quarterback Bobby Hebert was involved in a contract dispute that ultimately resulted in Hebert sitting out the entire season; while at one point a rumor circulated that Hebert would be traded to the Los Angeles Raiders in exchange for running back Marcus Allen and a 2nd round draft pick. Instead, during the season New Orleans traded a 1st, 2nd and 3rd round draft pick for 1991 in exchange for Dallas Cowboys quarterback Steve Walsh. After the season, Glenn Derby, John Fourcade, and Lonzell Hill retired.

== The season ==
The Saints, with a record of eight wins and eight losses, became the second team in NFL history at or below .500 to qualify for postseason play, and the first to do so as a wild card. Since no non-playoff team in the NFC had a record at or above .500, the Saints were awarded the final Wild Card seed. In the 1990 postseason, the Saints would lose to the Chicago Bears 16–6.

Others to finish 8–8 and make the playoffs were the 1985 Cleveland Browns, the 1991 New York Jets, the 1999 Detroit Lions, the 1999 Dallas Cowboys, the 2004 St. Louis Rams, the 2004 Minnesota Vikings, the 2006 New York Giants, the 2008 San Diego Chargers, the 2011 Denver Broncos and the 2020 Chicago Bears . However, the 2010 Seahawks would break this record, as they finished the 2010 season at 7–9 and clinched their division, becoming the first team in NFL history to win their division despite having a losing record, and this would be repeated by the 2014 Carolina Panthers and then repeated by the 2020 Washington Football Team and the 2022 Tampa Bay Buccaneers. Coincidentally, the Saints during that 2010 season met Seattle in that season's NFC Wild Card game, in which they were upset 41–36.

== Offseason ==
=== NFL draft ===
1990 New Orleans Saints draft
Round	Pick	Player	Position	College	Notes
1	14	Renaldo Turnbull *	Defensive end	West Virginia	
2	44	Vince Buck	Defensive back	Central State (OH)	
3	71	Joel Smeenge	Defensive end	Western Michigan	
4	98	DeMond Winston	Linebacker	Vanderbilt	
5	125	Charles Arbuckle	Tight end	UCLA	
6	156	Mike Buck	Quarterback	Maine	
6	158	James Williams	Linebacker	Mississippi State	
7	183	Scott Hough	Guard	Maine	
8	207	Gerry Gdowski	Quarterback	Nebraska	
8	210	Derrick Carr	Defensive end	Bowling Green	
9	233	Broderick Graves	Running back	Winston-Salem State	
9	236	Lonnie Brockman	Linebacker	West Virginia	
10	260	Gary Cooper	Wide receiver	Clemson	
10	267	Ernest Spears	Defensive back	USC	
11	287	Webbie Burnett	Defensive tackle	Western Kentucky	
12	320	Chris Port	Guard	Duke	
Made roster

=== Undrafted free agents ===
1990 undrafted free agents of note
Player	Position	College
Robert Brady	Wide receiver	Villanova
Michael Ford	Wide receiver	California
Willie Griffin	Nose Tackle	Nebraska
Jerome McIntosh	Wide receiver	Tulane

== Personnel ==
=== Staff ===
1990 New Orleans Saints staff
Front office: Owner/general partner – Tom Benson; President/general manager – Jim Finks; Vice president of administration – Jim Miller; Director of player personnel – Bill Kuharich; Head coaches: Head coach – Jim Mora; Offensive coaches: Offensive coordinator/quarterbacks – Carl Smith; Running backs – Jim Skipper; Wide receivers – Steve Walters; Offensive line – Paul Boudreau	Defensive coaches: Defensive coordinator – Steve Sidwell; Defensive line – John Pease; Linebackers – Vic Fangio; Defensive backs – Dom Capers; Special teams coaches: Special teams/tight ends – Joe Marciano; Strength and conditioning: Strength and conditioning – Russell Paternostro

=== Roster ===
1990 New Orleans Saints roster
Quarterbacks (QB): 16 Mike Buck; 11 John Fourcade; 4 Steve Walsh; Running backs (RB): 22 Gill Fenerty KR; 34 Craig Heyward; 21 Dalton Hilliard RB; 23 Buford Jordan; 36 Rueben Mayes; Wide receivers (WR): 86 Gerald Alphin; 87 Lonzell Hill; 84 Eric Martin; 80 Brett Perriman; 88 Floyd Turner; Tight ends (TE): 85 Hoby Brenner; 83 Greg Scales; 82 John Tice	Offensive linemen (OL): 67 Stan Brock T; 71 Richard Cooper T; 79 Glenn Derby T; 72 Jim Dombrowski G; 74 Kevin Haverdink T; 61 Joel Hilgenberg; 62 Brad Leggett C; 65 Steve Trapilo G; Defensive linemen (DL): 95 Travis Davis NT; 91 Robert Goff NT; 96 Michael Simmons DE; 99 Joel Smeenge DE; 97 Renaldo Turnbull DE; 94 Jim Wilks	Linebackers (LB): 52 Brian Forde OLB; 51 Sam Mills ILB; 57 Rickey Jackson OLB; 53 Vaughan Johnson ILB; 56 Pat Swilling OLB; 90 James Williams ILB; 92 DeMond Winston OLB; Defensive backs (DB): 28 Gene Atkins FS; 26 Vince Buck; 41 Toi Cook CB; 24 Milton Mack CB; 40 Robert Massey CB; 39 Brett Maxie SS; 33 Ernest Spears FS; 37 Bennie Thompson SS; Special teams (ST): 7 Morten Andersen K; 6 Tommy Barnhardt P	Practice squad: 81 Charles Arbuckle TE; 70 Chris Port G; Reserve: 93 Wayne Martin DE (IR); 35 Bobby Morse (IR); 38 Calvin Nicholson CB (IR); 73 Frank Warren DE (Susp.); Rookies in italics 47 active, 4 reserve, 2 practice squad

== Regular season ==
=== Schedule ===
Week	Date	Opponent	Result	Record	Venue	Attendance
1	September 10	**San Francisco 49ers**	**L** 12–13	0–1	Louisiana Superdome	68,629
2	September 16	at Minnesota Vikings	**L** 3–32	0–2	Hubert H. Humphrey Metrodome	56,272
3	September 23	Phoenix Cardinals	**W** 28–7	1–2	Louisiana Superdome	61,110
4	Bye					
5	October 7	at **Atlanta Falcons**	**L** 27–28	1–3	Atlanta–Fulton County Stadium	57,401
6	October 14	Cleveland Browns	**W** 25–20	2–3	Louisiana Superdome	68,608
7	October 21	at Houston Oilers	**L** 10–23	2–4	Houston Astrodome	57,908
8	October 28	Detroit Lions	**L** 10–27	2–5	Louisiana Superdome	64,368
9	November 4	at Cincinnati Bengals	**W** 21–7	3–5	Louisiana Superdome	60,067
10	November 11	Tampa Bay Buccaneers	**W** 35–7	4–5	Louisiana Superdome	67,865
11	November 18	at Washington Redskins	**L** 17–31	4–6	RFK Stadium	52,573
12	November 25	**Atlanta Falcons**	**W** 10–7	5–6	Louisiana Superdome	68,629
13	December 2	at Dallas Cowboys	**L** 13–17	5–7	Texas Stadium	60,087
14	December 9	at **Los Angeles Rams**	**W** 24–20	6–7	Anaheim Stadium	56,864
15	December 16	Pittsburgh Steelers	**L** 6–9	6–8	Louisiana Superdome	68,582
16	December 23	at **San Francisco 49ers**	**W** 13–10	7–8	Candlestick Park	60,112
17	December 31	**Los Angeles Rams**	**W** 20–17	8–8	Louisiana Superdome	68,647
Note: Intra-division opponents are in **bold** text.

=== Standings ===
NFC West
	W	L	T	PCT	DIV	CONF	PF	PA	STK
^{(1)} San Francisco 49ers	14	2	0	.875	4–2	10–2	353	239	W1
^{(6)} New Orleans Saints	8	8	0	.500	4–2	6–6	274	275	W2
Los Angeles Rams	5	11	0	.313	2–4	3–9	345	412	L4
Atlanta Falcons	5	11	0	.313	2–4	3–9	348	365	W2

== Playoffs ==
Round	Date	Opponent (seed)	Result	Record	Venue	Attendance
Wildcard	January 6, 1991	at Chicago Bears (3)	L 6–16	0–1	Soldier Field	60,767
