= 1988 New Orleans Saints season =

NFL team season

- Owner: Tom Benson
- General manager: Jim Finks
- Head coach: Jim Mora
- Home stadium: Louisiana Superdome

Results
- Record: 10–6
- Division place: 3rd NFC West
- Playoffs: Did not qualify
- Pro Bowlers: TE Hoby Brenner; WR Eric Martin; LB Sam Mills; K Morten Andersen

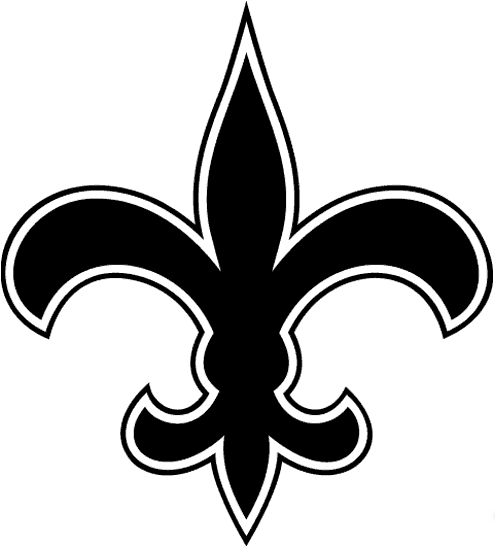
New Orleans Saints' Fleur-de-lis logo, 1967 - 1999

The 1988 New Orleans Saints season was the team's 22nd as a member of the National Football League (NFL). They were unable to match their previous season's output of 12–3, winning only ten games and missing the playoffs (and losing the division) by a tiebreaker, going 6–6 vs. NFC opponents compared to 8–4 for the San Francisco 49ers and Los Angeles Rams. Road losses to the Washington Redskins and Minnesota Vikings, as well as a sweep by San Francisco, ended up being the difference in New Orleans staying home and the California teams advancing.

With the Louisiana Superdome hosting the 1988 Republican National Convention; all but the last pre-season game (against the Pittsburgh Steelers) for the Saints were played on the road.

== Offseason ==
=== NFL draft ===
1988 New Orleans Saints draft
Round	Pick	Player	Position	College	Notes
1	24	Craig Heyward *	Running back	Pittsburgh	
2	52	Brett Perriman	Wide receiver	Miami (FL)	
3	81	Tony Stephens	Defensive tackle	Clemson	
4	106	Lydell Carr	Running back	Oklahoma	
5	112	Greg Scales	Tight end	Wake Forest	
5	134	Keith Taylor	Defensive back	Illinois	
6	162	Bob Sims	Guard	Florida	
7	190	Brian Forde	Linebacker	Washington State	
8	218	Glenn Derby	Offensive tackle	Wisconsin	
9	246	Clarence Nunn	Defensive back	San Diego State	
10	274	Todd Santos	Quarterback	San Diego State	
10	276	Vincent Fizer	Linebacker	Southern	
11	302	Gary Couch	Wide receiver	Minnesota	
12	330	Paul Jurgensen	Defensive end	Georgia Tech	
Made roster * Made at least one Pro Bowl during career

=== Training Camp ===
Prior to the start of the 1988 season, the Saints held training camp for the first time at the University of Wisconsin-La Crosse in La Crosse, Wisconsin. The team would hold training camp in La Crosse through the 1999 season.

== Personnel ==
=== Staff ===
1988 New Orleans Saints staff
Front office: Owner/general partner – Tom Benson; President/general manager – Jim Finks; Vice-president of administration – Jim Miller; Director of player personnel – Bill Kuharich; Head coaches: Head coach – Jim Mora; Offensive coaches: Offensive coordinator/quarterbacks – Carl Smith; Running backs – Jim Skipper; Wide receivers – Steve Walters; Offensive line – Paul Boudreau	Defensive coaches: Defensive coordinator – Steve Sidwell; Defensive line – John Pease; Linebackers – Vic Fangio; Defensive backs – Dom Capers; Special teams coaches: Special Teams/Tight Ends – Joe Marciano; Strength and conditioning: Strength and conditioning – Russell Paternostro

=== Roster ===
1988 New Orleans Saints roster
Quarterbacks (QB): 11 John Fourcade; 3 Bobby Hebert; 18 Dave Wilson; Running backs (RB): 37 Mel Gray; 34 Craig Heyward; 21 Dalton Hilliard; 23 Buford Jordan; 36 Rueben Mayes; Wide receivers (WR): 89 Robert Clark; 87 Lonzell Hill PR; 84 Eric Martin; 88 Mark Pattison; 80 Brett Perriman; Tight ends (TE): 85 Hoby Brenner; 83 Greg Scales; 82 John Tice	Offensive linemen (OL): 66 Chuck Commiskey C/G; 70 Bill Contz T; 72 Jim Dombrowski T; 63 Brad Edelman G; 77 Daren Gilbert T; 61 Joel Hilgenberg; 60 Steve Korte C; 65 Steve Trapilo G; Defensive linemen (DL): 76 Dwaine Board DE; 75 Bruce Clark DE; 95 Jon Dumbauld DE; 97 Jumpy Geathers DE; 73 Frank Warren DE; 94 Jim Wilks	Linebackers (LB): 52 Brian Forde OLB; 92 James Haynes OLB; 57 Rickey Jackson OLB; 53 Vaughan Johnson ILB; 55 Joe Kohlbrand OLB; 51 Sam Mills ILB; 56 Pat Swilling OLB; Defensive backs (DB): 28 Gene Atkins; 41 Toi Cook FS; 27 Antonio Gibson FS; 22 Van Jakes CB; 24 Milton Mack CB; 39 Brett Maxie FS; 29 Reggie Sutton CB; 44 Dave Waymer CB; Special teams (ST): 7 Morten Andersen K; 10 Brian Hansen P	Practice squad None; Reserve: 40 Michael Adams CB (IR); 67 Stan Brock T (IR); 59 James Campen C (IR); 42 Lydell Carr RB (IR); 79 Glenn Derby T (IR); 99 Tony Elliott NT (IR); 74 Ted Gregory NT (IR); 54 Alvin Toles LB (IR); 68 Jeff Walker T/G (IR); 47 active, 9 inactive Rookies in italics

== Schedule ==
Week	Date	Opponent	Result	Record	Venue	Attendance	Recap
1	September 4	**San Francisco 49ers**	**L** 33–34	0–1	Louisiana Superdome	66,357	
2	September 11	at **Atlanta Falcons**	**W** 29–21	1–1	Atlanta–Fulton County Stadium	48,901	
3	September 18	at Detroit Lions	**W** 22–14	2–1	Pontiac Silverdome	32,943	
4	September 25	Tampa Bay Buccaneers	**W** 13–9	3–1	Louisiana Superdome	66,671	
5	October 3	Dallas Cowboys	**W** 20–17	4–1	Louisiana Superdome	68,474	
6	October 9	at San Diego Chargers	**W** 23–17	5–1	Jack Murphy Stadium	42,693	
7	October 16	at Seattle Seahawks	**W** 20–19	6–1	Kingdome	63,569	
8	October 23	Los Angeles Raiders	**W** 20–6	7–1	Louisiana Superdome	66,249	
9	October 30	**Los Angeles Rams**	**L** 10–12	7–2	Louisiana Superdome	68,238	
10	November 6	at Washington Redskins	**L** 24–27	7–3	RFK Stadium	54,183	
11	November 13	at **Los Angeles Rams**	**W** 14–10	8–3	Anaheim Stadium	63,305	
12	November 20	Denver Broncos	**W** 42–0	9–3	Louisiana Superdome	68,075	
13	November 27	New York Giants	**L** 12–13	9–4	Louisiana Superdome	66,526	
14	December 4	at Minnesota Vikings	**L** 3–45	9–5	Hubert H. Humphrey Metrodome	61,215	
15	December 11	at **San Francisco 49ers**	**L** 17–30	9–6	Candlestick Park	62,977	
16	December 18	**Atlanta Falcons**	**W** 10–9	10–6	Louisiana Superdome	60,566	
Note: Intra-division opponents are in **bold** text.

== Game summaries ==
=== Week 1 (Sunday, September 4, 1988): vs. San Francisco 49ers ===
Week 1: San Francisco 49ers at New Orleans Saints – Game summary

Quarter	1	2	3	4	Total
49ers (1–0)	7	3	21	3	34
Saints (0–1)	7	10	0	16	33

at Louisiana Superdome • New Orleans, Louisiana

- Date: September 4, 1988
- Game time: 12:01 p.m. CDT
- Game weather: indoors
- Game attendance: 66,357
- Referee: Jerry Markbreit
- TV announcers (CBS): Verne Lundquist (play–by–play) and John Madden (color commentator)

Team	Category	Player	Statistics
SF	Passing	Joe Montana	13/23, 161 YDS, 3 TDs, 1 INT
SF	Rushing	Roger Craig	18 CAR, 67 YDS, 1 TD
SF	Receiving	Roger Craig	5 REC, 43 YDS
NO	Passing	Bobby Hebert	22/31, 245 YDS, 4 TDs, 2 INTs
NO	Rushing	Dalton Hilliard	19 CAR, 95 YDS
NO	Receiving	Lonzell Hill	7 REC, 74 YDS, 1 TD

Scoring summary

Quarter	Time	Drive			Team	Scoring information	Score	
Quarter	Time	Plays	Yards	TOP	Team	Scoring information	SF	NO
1	8:41	13	70		49ers	Craig 1-yard touchdown run, Cofer kick good	7	0
1	1:24	12	67		Saints	Martin 2-yard touchdown reception from Hebert, Andersen kick good	7	7
2	14:55	3	28		Saints	Clark 21-yard touchdown reception from Hebert, Andersen kick good	7	14
2	8:47	7	24		Saints	20-yard field goal by Andersen	7	17
2	6:55	6	51		49ers	25-yard field goal by Cofer	10	17
3	11:05	4	49		49ers	Frank 9-yard touchdown reception from Montana, Cofer kick good	17	17
3	8:05	5	35		49ers	Wilson 71-yard touchdown reception from Montana, Cofer kick good	24	17
3	3:07	6	42		49ers	Frank 17-yard touchdown reception from Montana, Cofer kick good	31	17
4	13:26	10	79		Saints	Hill 18-yard touchdown reception from Hebert, Andersen kick good	31	24
4	6:33	–	–	–	Saints	Swilling tackled Young in end zone for a safety	31	26
4	1:50	9	29		49ers	32-yard field goal by Cofer	34	26
4	0:21	8	70		Saints	Perriman 15-yard touchdown reception from Hebert, Andersen kick good	34	33
"TOP" = time of possession. For other American football terms, see Glossary of American football.							34	33

- Point spread: Saints Pick'em
- Over/under: 43.0 (over)
- Time of game: 3 hours, 7 minutes

49ers	Game statistics	Saints
21	First downs	23
32–124	Rushes–yards	31–147
165	Passing yards	245
14–26–1	Passes	22–31–2
0–0	Sacked–yards	5–48
165	Net passing yards	197
289	Total yards	344
128	Return yards	310
1–24.0	Punts	3–40.0
1–1	Fumbles–lost	2–1
2–12	Penalties–yards	10–77
23:50	Time of possession	36:10

Starting Lineups

Position	Starting Lineups – Week 1: vs. San Francisco
Offense
QB	#3 Bobby Hebert
RB	#21 Dalton Hilliard
FB	#34 Craig Heyward
WR	#87 Lonzell Hill
WR	#84 Eric Martin
TE	#85 Hoby Brenner
LT	#72 Jim Dombrowski
LG	#63 Brad Edelman
C	#60 Steve Korte
RG	#65 Steve Trapilo
RT	#67 Stan Brock
Defense
LDE	#97 Jumpy Geathers
NT	#99 Tony Elliott
RDE	#94 Jim Wilks
LOLB	#57 Rickey Jackson
LILB	#51 Sam Mills
RILB	#53 Vaughn Johnson
ROLB	#56 Pat Swilling
LCB	#44 Dave Waymer
RCB	#22 Van Jakes
SS	#27 Antonio Gibson
FS	#39 Brett Maxie

Individual stats

Saints Passing
	C/ATT^{1}	Yds	TD	INT	Sk	Yds	LG^{3}	Rate
Hebert	22/31	245	4	2	5	48	33	106.9

Saints Rushing
	Car^{2}	Yds	TD	LG^{3}
Hilliard	19	95	0	22
Heyward	8	27	0	11
Hebert	1	16	0	16
Hill	1	5	0	5
Mayes	2	4	0	3

Saints Receiving
	Rec^{4}	Yds	TD	LG^{3}
Hill	7	74	1	18
Martin	7	68	1	19
Clark	3	45	1	21
Perriman	2	48	1	33
Tice	2	5	0	8
Hilliard	1	5	0	5

Saints Kick Returns
	Ret	Yds	Y/Rt	TD	Lng
Gray	6	144	24.0	0	0
Mayes	2	45	22.5	0	0

Saints Punting
	Pnt	Yds	Y/P	Lng	Blck
Hansen	3	120	40.0	0	0

Saints Kicking
	XPM–XPA	FGM–FGA
Anderson	4–4	1–1

Saints Interceptions
	Int	Yds	TD	LG	PD
Waymer	1	44	0	44	

=== Week 2 ===
Team	1	2	3	4	Total
• Saints	3	9	10	7	29
Falcons	7	7	7	0	21

- Date: September 11
- Location: Atlanta–Fulton County Stadium
- Game start: 1:00 p.m. EST
- Game attendance: 48,901
- Game weather: 75 °F (24 °C); wind 10 mph (16 km/h)

Scoring summary
Q1	NO	Andersen 41 yard field goal	NO 3–0
Q1	ATL	Whisenhunt 12 yard pass from Miller (Davis kick)	ATL 7–3
Q2	ATL	Higdon 34 yard pass from Miller (Davis kick)	ATL 14–3
Q2	NO	Andersen 29 yard field goal	ATL 14–6
Q2	NO	Martin 14 yard pass from Hebert (kick failed)	ATL 14–12
Q3	NO	Andersen 28 yard field goal	NO 15–14
Q3	ATL	Settle 1 yard run (Davis kick)	ATL 21–15
Q3	NO	Mayes 17 yard run (Andersen kick)	NO 22–21
Q4	NO	Hilliard 4 yard run (Andersen kick)	NO 29–21

=== Week 3 ===
The Saints won for the first time in Detroit going 0-4-1 in their previous five trips to Michigan (three to Tiger Stadium and two to the Pontiac Silverdome).

Team	1	2	3	4	Total
• Saints	0	7	12	3	22
Lions	7	7	0	0	14

- Date: September 18
- Location: Pontiac Silverdome
- Game start: 1:00 p.m. EST
- Game attendance: 32,943
- Game weather: Indoors (dome)
- Referee: Johnny Grier
- TV announcers (CBS): James Brown and Gary Fencik

Scoring summary
Q1	DET	Bland 9 yard pass from Long (Murray kick)	DET 7–0
Q2	NO	Hill 29 yard pass from Hebert (Andersen kick)	Tie 7–7
Q2	DET	Bland 10 yard pass from Long (Murray kick)	DET 14–7
Q3	NO	Andersen 37 yard field goal	DET 14–10
Q3	NO	Safety, Long tackled by Jackson in end zone	DET 14–12
Q3	NO	Hilliard 4 yard run (Anderson kick)	NO 19–14
Q4	NO	Andersen 29 yard field goal	NO 22–14

=== Week 4 ===
Team	1	2	3	4	Total
Buccaneers	0	6	0	3	9
• Saints	10	3	0	0	13

- Date: September 25
- Location: Louisiana Superdome
- Game start: 1:00 p.m. EST
- Game attendance: 66,671
- Game weather: Indoors (dome)

Scoring summary
Q1	NO	Hill 5 yard pass from Hebert (Andersen kick)	NO 7–0
Q1	NO	Andersen 28 yard field goal	NO 10–0
Q2	TB	Igwebuike 25 yard field goal	NO 10–3
Q2	NO	Andersen 41 yard field goal	NO 13–3
Q2	TB	Igwebuike 35 yard field goal	NO 13–6
Q4	TB	Igwebuike 35 yard field goal	NO 13–9

=== Week 5 ===
Team	1	2	3	4	Total
Cowboys	0	7	7	3	17
• Saints	7	7	3	3	20

- Date: October 3
- Location: Louisiana Superdome
- Game start: 9:00 p.m. EST
- Game attendance: 68,474
- Game weather: Indoors (dome)
- Referee: Gene Barth
- TV announcers (ABC): Frank Gifford and Dan Dierdorf

Scoring summary
Q1	NO	Hill 7 yard pass from Hebert (Andersen kick)	NO 7–0
Q2	NO	Perriman 17 yard pass from Hebert (Anderson kick)	NO 14–0
Q2	DAL	Martin 13 yard pass from Pelluer (Ruzek kick)	NO 14–7
Q3	DAL	Martin 14 yard pass from Pelluer (Ruzek kick)	Tie 14–14
Q3	NO	Andersen 27 yard field goal	NO 17–14
Q4	DAL	Ruzek 39 yard field goal	Tie 17–17
Q4	NO	Andersen 49 yard field goal	NO 20–17

=== Week 6 ===
Team	1	2	3	4	Total
• Saints	0	13	7	3	23
Chargers	14	0	3	0	17

- Date: October 9
- Location: Jack Murphy Stadium
- Game start: 4:00 p.m. EST
- Game attendance: 42,693
- Game weather: 72 °F (22 °C); wind 8 mph (13 km/h)
- Referee: Ben Dreith
- TV announcers (CBS): Tim Ryan and Dan Jiggetts

Scoring summary
Q1	SD	Miller 47 yard pass from Laufenberg (Abbott kick)	SD 7–0
Q1	SD	Roy Bennett recovered fumble in end zone (Abbott kick)	SD 14–0
Q2	NO	Andersen 27 yard field goal	SD 14–3
Q2	NO	Andersen 35 yard field goal	SD 14–6
Q2	NO	Hill 19 yard pass from Hebert (Andersen kick)	SD 14–13
Q3	NO	Martin 10 yard pass from Hebert (Andersen kick)	NO 20–14
Q3	SD	Abbott 35 yard field goal	NO 20–17
Q4	NO	Andersen 34 yard field goal	NO 23–17

=== Week 7 ===
Team	1	2	3	4	Total
• Saints	0	10	7	3	20
Seahawks	3	3	6	7	19

- Date: October 16
- Location: Kingdome
- Game start: 4:00 p.m. EST
- Game attendance: 63,569
- Game weather: Indoors (dome)
- Referee: Pat Haggerty
- TV announcers (CBS): Dick Stockton and Dan Fouts

Scoring summary
Q1	SEA	Johnson 22 yard field goal	SEA 3–0
Q2	NO	Martin 19 yard pass from Hebert (Andersen kick)	NO 7–3
Q2	SEA	Johnson 47 yard field goal	NO 7–6
Q2	NO	Andersen 23 yard field goal	NO 10–6
Q3	SEA	Johnson 46 yard field goal	NO 10–9
Q3	NO	Waymer 58 yard blocked field goal return (Andersen kick)	NO 17–9
Q3	SEA	Johnson 42 yard field goal	NO 17–12
Q4	NO	Andersen 31 yard field goal	NO 20–12
Q4	SEA	Blades 3 yard pass from Stouffer (Johnson kick)	NO 20–19

=== Week 8 ===
The Saints defeated the Raiders for the first time in six meetings (the 1971 matchup, the first between the teams, ended in a 21-21 tie).

Team	1	2	3	4	Total
Raiders	0	6	0	0	6
• Saints	3	0	14	3	20

- Date: October 23
- Location: Louisiana Superdome
- Game start: 1:00 p.m. EST
- Game attendance: 66,249
- Game weather: Indoors (dome)
- Referee: Jerry Seeman
- Television network: NBC

Scoring summary
Q1	NO	Andersen 51 yard field goal	NO 3–0
Q2	LA	Fernandez 85 yard pass from Schroeder (kick failed)	LA 6–3
Q3	NO	Heyward 73 yard run (Andersen kick)	NO 10–7
Q3	NO	Hilliard 7 yard run (Andersen kick)	NO 17–7
Q4	NO	Andersen 25 yard field goal	NO 20–7

=== Week 11 ===
Team	1	2	3	4	Total
• Saints	0	7	7	0	14
Rams	0	3	0	7	10

- Date: November 13
- Location: Anaheim Stadium
- Game start: 4:00 p.m. EST
- Game attendance: 63,305
- Game weather: 61 °F (16 °C); wind 6 mph (9.7 km/h)
- Referee: Tom Dooley
- TV announcers (CBS): Dick Stockton and Dan Fouts

Scoring summary
Q2	NO	Hilliard 4 yard run (Andersen kick)	NO 7–0
Q2	LA	Lansford 23 yard field goal	NO 7–3
Q3	NO	Mayes 3 yard run (Andersen kick)	NO 14–3
Q4	LA	Bell 1 yard run (Lansford kick)	NO 14–10

=== Week 12 ===
In the Broncos' first appearance in the Louisiana Superdome since Super Bowl XII 11 years earlier, the Saints defeated Denver for the first time in five tries, and posted their largest margin of victory at the time.

Team	1	2	3	4	Total
Broncos	0	0	0	0	0
• Saints	14	7	14	7	42

- Date: November 20
- Location: Louisiana Superdome
- Game start: 1:00 p.m. EST
- Game attendance: 68,075
- Game weather: Indoors (dome)
- Referee: Dick Jorgensen
- TV announcers (NBC): Dick Enberg and Merlin Olsen

Scoring summary
Q1	NO	Mayes 2 yard run (Andersen kick)	NO 7–0
Q1	NO	Hilliard 2 yard run (Andersen kick)	NO 14–0
Q2	NO	Martin 40 yard pass from Hebert (Andersen kick)	NO 21–0
Q3	NO	Gray 66 yard punt return (Andersen kick)	NO 28–0
Q3	NO	Tice 8 yard pass from Hebert (Andersen kick)	NO 35–0
Q4	NO	Martin 6 yard pass from Hebert (Andersen kick)	NO 42–0

=== Week 15 (Sunday, December 11, 1988): at San Francisco 49ers ===
Week 15: New Orleans Saints at San Francisco 49ers – Game summary

Quarter	1	2	3	4	Total
Saints (9–6)	3	7	7	0	17
49ers (10–5)	0	21	3	6	30

at Candlestick Park • San Francisco, California

- Date: December 11, 1988
- Game time: 3:00 p.m. CST
- Game weather: 62 °F (17 °C); (Drizzle) wind 5
- Game attendance: 62,977
- Referee: Red Cashion
- TV announcers (CBS): Pat Summerall (play–by–play) and John Madden (color commentator)

Team	Category	Player	Statistics
NO	Passing	Bobby Hebert	19/30, 170 YDS, 1 TD, 1 INT
NO	Rushing	Dalton Hilliard	9 CAR, 35 YDS
NO	Receiving	Eric Martin	7 REC, 61 YDS
SF	Passing	Joe Montana	18/29, 233 YDS, 1 TD, 1 INT
SF	Rushing	Roger Craig	22 CAR, 115 YDS, 1 TD
SF	Receiving	Jerry Rice	6 REC, 78 YDS

Scoring summary

Quarter	Time	Drive			Team	Scoring information	Score	
Quarter	Time	Plays	Yards	TOP	Team	Scoring information	NO	SF
1	10:36	3	3		Saints	38-yard field goal by Andersen	3	0
2	12:17	8	56		49ers	Craig 1-yard touchdown run, Cofer kick good	3	7
2	11:05	1	27		Saints	Hill 27-yard touchdown reception from Hilliard, Andersen kick good	10	7
2	6:05	9	80		49ers	Montana 2-yard touchdown run, Cofer kick good	10	14
2	3:37	1	66		49ers	Taylor 66-yard touchdown reception from Montana, Cofer kick good	10	21
3	6:50	4	31		49ers	40-yard field goal by Cofer	10	24
3	1:25	8	80		Saints	Scales 6-yard touchdown reception from Hebert, Andersen kick good	17	24
4	11:53	9	43		49ers	43-yard field goal by Cofer	17	27
4	9:18	4	3		49ers	19-yard field goal by Cofer	17	30
"TOP" = time of possession. For other American football terms, see Glossary of American football.							17	30

- Point spread: Saints +6
- Over/under: 41.0 (over)
- Time of game: 3 hours, 1 minute

Saints	Game statistics	49ers
15	First downs	20
24–70	Rushes–yards	35–152
197	Passing yards	233
20–35–1	Passes	18–29–1
2–15	Sacked–yards	2–12
182	Net passing yards	221
252	Total yards	373
127	Return yards	79
5–38.2	Punts	3–36.7
2–1	Fumbles–lost	1–1
2–11	Penalties–yards	1–0
26:35	Time of possession	33:25

Starting Lineups

Position	Starting Lineups – Week 15: at San Francisco
Offense
QB	#3 Bobby Hebert
RB	#36 Rueben Mayes
RB	#23 Buford Jordan
WR	#84 Eric Martin
TE	#82 John Tice
TE	#85 Hoby Brenner
LT	#72 Jim Dombrowski
LG	#63 Brad Edelman
C	#60 Steve Korte
RG	#65 Steve Trapilo
RT	#67 Stan Brock
Defense
LDE	#73 Frank Warren
NT	#97 Jumpy Geathers
RDE	#94 Jim Wilks
LOLB	#57 Rickey Jackson
LILB	#51 Sam Mills
RILB	#53 Vaughn Johnson
ROLB	#56 Pat Swilling
LCB	#44 Dave Waymer
RCB	#22 Van Jakes
SS	#27 Antonio Gibson
FS	#39 Brett Maxie

Individual stats

Saints Passing
	C/ATT^{1}	Yds	TD	INT	Sk	Yds	LG^{3}	Rate
Hebert	19/34	170	1	1	2	12	28	67.0
Hilliard	1/1	27	1	0	0	0	27	158.3

Saints Rushing
	Car^{2}	Yds	TD	LG^{3}
Hilliard	9	35	0	10
Hebert	3	14	0	3
Mayes	8	10	0	4
Heyward	3	8	0	3
Martin	1	3	0	3

Saints Receiving
	Rec^{4}	Yds	TD	LG^{3}
Martin	7	61	0	20
Hill	6	61	1	27
Tice	3	44	0	28
Hilliard	1	9	0	9
Pattison	1	8	0	8
Perriman	1	8	0	8
Scales	1	6	1	6

Saints Kick Returns
	Ret	Yds	Y/Rt	TD	Lng
Atkins	4	58	14.5	0	0
Gray	2	44	22.0	0	0

Saints Punt Returns
	Ret	Yds	Y/Rt	TD	Lng
Gray	1	4	4.0	0	4
Hill	1	4	4.0	0	4

Saints Punting
	Pnt	Yds	Y/P	Lng	Blck
Hansen	5	191	38.2	0	0

Saints Kicking
	XPM–XPA	FGM–FGA	MFG
Anderson	2–2	1–3	40, 32

Saints Sacks
	Sacks
Swilling	1.0
Wilks	1.0

Saints Interceptions
	Int	Yds	TD	LG	PD
Waymer	1	17	0	17	

=== Week 16 ===
Team	1	2	3	4	Total
Falcons	0	3	3	3	9
• Saints	7	0	0	3	10

- Date: December 18
- Location: Louisiana Superdome
- Game start: 1:00 p.m. EST
- Game attendance: 60,566
- Game weather: Indoors (dome)
- Referee: Pat Haggerty
- TV announcers (CBS): Dick Stockton and Dan Fouts

Scoring summary
Q1	NO	Hilliard 13 yard pass from Hebert (Andersen kick)	NO 7–0
Q2	ATL	Davis 27 yard field goal	NO 7–3
Q3	ATL	Davis 43 yard field goal	NO 7–6
Q4	ATL	Davis 39 yard field goal	ATL 9–7
Q4	NO	Andersen 30 yard field goal	NO 10–9

== Standings ==
NFC West
	W	L	T	PCT	DIV	CONF	PF	PA	STK
San Francisco 49ers^{(2)}	10	6	0	.625	4–2	8–4	369	294	L1
Los Angeles Rams^{(5)}	10	6	0	.625	4–2	8–4	407	293	W3
New Orleans Saints	10	6	0	.625	3–3	6–6	312	283	W1
Atlanta Falcons	5	11	0	.313	1–5	4–8	244	315	L3
