= 1991 New Orleans Saints season =

NFL team season

- Owner: Tom Benson
- General manager: Jim Finks
- Head coach: Jim Mora
- Offensive coordinator: Carl Smith
- Defensive coordinator: Steve Sidwell
- Home stadium: Louisiana Superdome

Results
- Record: 11–5
- Division place: 1st NFC West
- Playoffs: Lost Wild Card Playoffs (vs. Falcons) 20–27
- Pro Bowlers: LB Pat Swilling; LB Sam Mills; LB Rickey Jackson; LB Vaughan Johnson; ST Bennie Thompson

The 1991 New Orleans Saints season was the team's 25th season in the National Football League. The Saints won their first-ever division title, and reached the postseason for the second consecutive year. However, they lost their playoff opener at home in the wild card round to their bitter division rival, the Atlanta Falcons, and would have to wait another nine years before winning their first playoff game in franchise history.

The 1991 Saints had 48 defensive takeaways, tied for the most for any team in a single season in the 1990s. Statistics site Football Outsiders calculates that the 1991 Saints had the second-best defense in the NFL (behind the Philadelphia Eagles), and one of the top-ten defenses of all time, in terms of efficiency. This was also the first season where four linebackers from the same team made the pro bowl, which the Saints would do again the next season. Says Football Outsiders,

The Saints were led by their linebackers, with Sam Mills, Vaughan Johnson, and Pat Swilling all making the Pro Bowl and Rickey Jackson being awesome without getting a trip to Hawaii. It wasn't really the easiest year to find space on the NFC Pro Bowl defense, was it?

The season saw the adoption of the Cha-Ching slogan from a Rally's advertising campaign.

After the season, Brian Forde and Kevin Haverdink retired.

== Offseason ==
=== NFL draft ===
1991 New Orleans Saints draft
Round	Pick	Player	Position	College	Notes
2	42	Wesley Carroll	Wide receiver	Miami (FL)	
5	126	Reggie Jones	Cornerback	Memphis	
6	154	Fred McAfee	Running back	Mississippi College	
7	182	Hayward Haynes	Guard	Florida State	
8	210	Frank Wainright	Tight end	Northern Colorado	
9	237	Anthony Wallace	Running back	California	
11	293	Scott Ross	Linebacker	USC	
12	321	Mark Drabczak	Guard	Minnesota	
Made roster

== Personnel ==
=== Staff ===
1991 New Orleans Saints staff
Front office: Owner/general partner – Tom Benson; President/general manager – Jim Finks; Vice-president of administration – Jim Miller; Director of player personnel – Bill Kuharich; Head coaches: Head coach – Jim Mora; Offensive coaches: Offensive coordinator/quarterbacks – Carl Smith; Running backs – Jim Skipper; Wide receivers – Steve Walters; Offensive line – Paul Boudreau	Defensive coaches: Defensive coordinator – Steve Sidwell; Defensive line – John Pease; Linebackers – Vic Fangio; Defensive backs – Dom Capers; Special teams coaches: Special Teams/tight ends – Joe Marciano; Strength and conditioning: Strength and conditioning – Russell Paternostro

=== Roster ===
1991 New Orleans Saints roster
Quarterbacks (QB): 16 Mike Buck; 3 Bobby Hebert; 4 Steve Walsh; Running backs (RB): 22 Gill Fenerty PR; 21 Dalton Hilliard; 23 Buford Jordan FB; 25 Fred McAfee; 30 Cedric Smith FB; Wide receivers (WR): 80 Wesley Carroll; 89 Quinn Early KR; 84 Eric Martin; 86 Pat Newman; 88 Floyd Turner; Tight ends (TE): 85 Hoby Brenner; 82 John Tice; 87 Frank Wainright	Offensive linemen (OL): 67 Stan Brock T; 71 Richard Cooper T; 72 Jim Dombrowski G; 61 Joel Hilgenberg; 78 Mike Keim T; 62 Brad Leggett C; 70 Chris Port G; 66 Larry Williams G; Defensive linemen (DL): 91 Robert Goff NT; 93 Wayne Martin DE; 69 Les Miller; 99 Joel Smeenge DE; 97 Renaldo Turnbull DE; 73 Frank Warren DE; 94 Jim Wilks NT	Linebackers (LB): 52 Brian Forde OLB; 57 Rickey Jackson OLB; 53 Vaughan Johnson ILB; 51 Sam Mills ILB; 56 Pat Swilling OLB; 90 James Williams ILB; Defensive backs (DB): 28 Gene Atkins; 29 Vencie Glenn FS; 27 Reggie Jones CB; 32 Mark Lee CB; 24 Milton Mack CB; 39 Brett Maxie SS; 45 Stan Petry CB; 37 Bennie Thompson SS; Special teams (ST): 7 Morten Andersen K; 6 Tommy Barnhardt P	Practice squad: 43 Anthony Florence CB; 38 Calvin Nicholson CB; 55 Scott Ross LB; Reserve: 26 Vince Buck (IR); 41 Toi Cook CB (IR); 74 Kevin Haverdink T (IR); 34 Craig Heyward FB (Susp.); 36 Stanford Jennings (IR); 60 Derek Kennard G (IR); 35 Bobby Morse RB (IR); 83 Greg Scales TE (IR); 65 Steve Trapilo G (IR); 92 DeMond Winston LB (IR); 47 active, 10 inactive, 3 practice squad Rookies in italics

== Preseason ==
Week	Date	Opponent	Result	Record	Venue	Attendance
1	August 3	Minnesota Vikings	W 18–3	1–0	Louisiana Superdome	58,593
2	August 10	Green Bay Packers	W 31–20	2–0	Louisiana Superdome	55,730
3	August 17	at Indianapolis Colts	L 28–34	2–1	Hoosier Dome	45,963
4	August 24	at Miami Dolphins	L 24–28	2–2	Joe Robbie Stadium	44,099

== Regular season ==
=== Schedule ===
Week	Date	Opponent	Result	Record	Venue	Attendance
1	September 1	Seattle Seahawks	**W** 27–24	1–0	Louisiana Superdome	68,492
2	September 8	at Kansas City Chiefs	**W** 17–10	2–0	Arrowhead Stadium	74,816
3	September 15	**Los Angeles Rams**	**W** 24–7	3–0	Louisiana Superdome	68,583
4	September 22	Minnesota Vikings	**W** 26–0	4–0	Louisiana Superdome	68,591
5	September 29	at **Atlanta Falcons**	**W** 27–6	5–0	Atlanta–Fulton County Stadium	56,556
6	Bye					
7	October 13	at Philadelphia Eagles	**W** 13–6	6–0	Veterans Stadium	64,224
8	October 20	Tampa Bay Buccaneers	**W** 23–7	7–0	Louisiana Superdome	68,591
9	October 27	Chicago Bears	**L** 17–20	7–1	Louisiana Superdome	68,591
10	November 3	at **Los Angeles Rams**	**W** 24–17	8–1	Anaheim Stadium	58,713
11	November 10	**San Francisco 49ers**	**W** 10–3	9–1	Louisiana Superdome	68,591
12	November 17	at San Diego Chargers	**L** 21–24	9–2	Jack Murphy Stadium	48,420
13	November 24	**Atlanta Falcons**	**L** 20–23 (OT)	9–3	Louisiana Superdome	68,591
14	December 1	at **San Francisco 49ers**	**L** 24–38	9–4	Candlestick Park	62,092
15	December 8	at Dallas Cowboys	**L** 14–23	9–5	Texas Stadium	64,530
16	December 16	Los Angeles Raiders	**W** 27–0	10–5	Louisiana Superdome	68,625
17	December 22	at Phoenix Cardinals	**W** 27–3	11–5	Sun Devil Stadium	30,928
Note: Intra-division opponents are in **bold** text.

=== Game summaries ===
==== Week 1: vs Seattle Seahawks ====
Week One: Seattle Seahawks at New Orleans Saints – Game summary

Quarter	1	2	3	4	Total
Seahawks	0	7	17	0	**24**
**Saints**	7	13	0	7	**27**

at Superdome, New Orleans, Louisiana

- Date: September 1
- Game time: 12:01 pm local
- Game weather: indoors
- Game attendance: 68,492
- Referee: Bernie Kukar
- TV: NBC
- Gamebook

Game information

**First quarter**

- NO – Gill Fenerty 50-yard pass from Bobby Hebert (Morten Andersen kick), 10:54 (NO 7–0)

**Second quarter**

- NO – Morten Andersen 47-yard field goal, 13:59 (NO 10–0)
- NO – Pat Swilling 39-yard interception return (Morten Andersen kick), 13:36 (NO 17–0)
- SEA – Brian Blades 10-yard pass from Dave Krieg (John Kasay kick), 8:29 (NO 17–7)
- NO – Morten Andersen 31-yard field goal, 3:26 (NO 20–7)

**Third quarter**

- SEA – Brian Blades 25-yard pass from Dave Krieg (John Kasay kick), 12:22 (NO 20–14)
- SEA – John Kasay 37-yard field goal, 8:29 (NO 20–17)
- SEA – Brian Davis 40-yard interception return (John Kasay kick), 0:14 (SEA 24–20)

**Fourth quarter**

- NO – Floyd Turner 20-yard pass from Bobby Hebert (Morten Andersen kick), 1:11 (NO 27–24)

**Top passers**

- SEA – Dave Krieg: 26/35, 274 yds, 2 TD, 2 INT
- NO – Bobby Hebert: 18/29, 226 yds, 2 TD, 2 INT

**Top rushers**

- SEA – John L. Williams: 6 car, 22 yds
- NO – Dalton Hilliard: 9 car, 18 yds

**Top receivers**

- SEA – Brian Blades: 12 rec, 160 yds, 2 TD
- NO – Gill Fenerty: 3 rec, 66 yds, 1 TD

**Team** – pass – rush – total – to

- SEA – 302 – 46 – 348 – 4
- NO – 201 – 43 – 244 – 3

==== Week 2: at Kansas City Chiefs ====
Week 2: New Orleans Saints at Kansas City Chiefs – Game summary

Quarter	1	2	3	4	Total
**Saints**	10	7	0	0	**17**
Chiefs	0	0	3	7	**10**

at Arrowhead Stadium, Kansas City, Missouri

- Date: September 8
- Game time: 12:00 p.m. CDT
- Game weather: 80 °F (27 °C)
- Game attendance: 74,816
- Referee: Red Cashion
- TV announcers (CBS): Jim Nantz and Hank Stram
- Recap, Game Book

Game information

**First quarter**

- NO – Morten Andersen 40-yard field goal, 7:44. Saints 3–0. **Drive: 12 plays, 55 yards, 7:16.**
- NO – Eric Martin 13-yard pass from Bobby Hebert (Morten Andersen kick), 1:20. Saints 10–0. **Drive: 8 plays, 55 yards, 5:11.**

**Second quarter**

- NO – Quinn Early 45-yard pass from Bobby Hebert (Morten Andersen kick), 5:05. Saints 17–0. **Drive: 6 plays, 65 yards, 4:16.**

**Third quarter**

- KC – Nick Lowery 23-yard field goal, 6:02. Saints 17–3. **Drive: 15 plays, 88 yards, 8:58.**

**Fourth quarter**

- KC – Jonathan Hayes 7-yard pass from Steve DeBerg (Nick Lowery kick), 13:52. Saints 17–10. **Drive: 13 plays, 59 yards, 5:16.**

**Top passers**

- NO – Bobby Hebert – 19/27, 211 yards, 2 TD
- KC – Steve DeBerg – 23/43, 212 yards, TD, 2 INT

**Top rushers**

- NO – Craig Heyward – 15 rushes, 51 yards
- KC – Barry Word – 10 rushes, 40 yards

**Top receivers**

- NO – Eric Martin – 7 receptions, 67 yards, TD
- KC – Todd McNair – 8 receptions, 62 yards

==== Week 3 ====
New Orleans Saints 24, Los Angeles Rams 7

Quarter	1	2	3	4	Total
Rams	0	0	7	0	**7**
**Saints**	7	0	7	10	**24**

at Louisiana Superdome, New Orleans, Louisiana

- Game time: 8:04 p.m. EST
- Game weather: Played indoors, domed stadium
- Game attendance: 68,583
- Referee: Tom Dooley
- TV: TNT

Rams Jim Everett completed only 6 passes against the Saints defense, while Craig Heyward scored 2 touchdowns to send the Saints to a 3–0 record.

==== Week 12: at San Diego Chargers ====
Week Twelve: New Orleans Saints at San Diego Chargers – Game summary

Quarter	1	2	3	4	Total
Saints	7	14	0	0	**21**
**Chargers**	7	7	0	10	**24**

at Jack Murphy Stadium, San Diego, California

- Date: November 17
- Game time: 1:00 p.m. PST
- Game weather: 58 °F (14.4 °C), relative humidity 69%, wind 9 miles per hour (14 km/h; 7.8 kn)
- Game attendance: 48,420
- Referee: Red Cashion
- TV announcers (CBS): Sean McDonough and Dave Jennings
- Box score

Game information

**First quarter**

- NO – Buford Jordan 1-yard pass from Steve Walsh (Morten Andersen kick), 7:22. Saints 7–0. **Drive: 12 plays, 78 yards, 7:38.**
- SDG – Steve Hendrickson 3-yard run (John Carney kick), 2:48. Tied 7–7. **Drive: 9 plays, 80 yards, 4:34.**

**Second quarter**

- NO – Frank Warren 37-yard blocked punt return (Morten Andersen kick), 8:08. Saints 14–7.
- SDG – Nate Lewis 95-yard kickoff return (John Carney kick), 7:52. Tied 14–14.
- NO – Quinn Early 38-yard pass from Steve Walsh (Morten Andersen kick), 3:00. Saints 21–14. **Drive: 7 plays, 77 yards, 4:52.**

**Third quarter**

- No scoring plays.

**Fourth quarter**

- SDG – Marion Butts 5-yard run (John Carney kick), 3:04. Tied 21–21. **Drive: 11 plays, 63 yards, 3:27.**
- SDG – John Carney 19-yard field goal, 0:05. Chargers 24–21. **Drive: 7 plays, 70 yards, 1:31.**

**Top passers**

- NO – Steve Walsh – 21/34, 203 yards, 2 TD, INT
- SDG – John Friesz – 16/30, 175 yards, INT

**Top rushers**

- NO – Fred McAfee – 8 rushes, 45 yards
- SDG – Marion Butts – 15 rushes, 92 yards, TD

**Top receivers**

- NO – Eric Martin – 4 receptions, 50 yards
- SDG – Nate Lewis – 2 receptions, 38 yards

=== Playoffs ===
Round	Date	Opponent (seed)	Result	Record	Venue	Attendance
Wildcard	December 28	Atlanta Falcons (6)	**L** 20–27	0–1	Louisiana Superdome	68,794

=== Standings ===
NFC West
	W	L	T	PCT	DIV	CONF	PF	PA	STK
^{(3)} New Orleans Saints	11	5	0	.688	4–2	8–4	341	211	W2
^{(6)} Atlanta Falcons	10	6	0	.625	5–1	7–5	361	338	L1
San Francisco 49ers	10	6	0	.625	3–3	7–5	393	239	W6
Los Angeles Rams	3	13	0	.188	0–6	2–10	234	390	L10

== Playoffs ==
=== NFC Wild Card Game ===
Atlanta Falcons 27, New Orleans Saints 20

Quarter	1	2	3	4	Total
Falcons	0	10	7	10	27
Saints	7	6	0	7	20

at Louisiana Superdome, New Orleans, Louisiana

- Game time: 4:00 p.m. EST/3:00 p.m. CST
- Game weather: Played indoors, domed stadium
- Game attendance: 68,794
- Referee: Howard Roe
- TV announcers (ABC): Al Michaels, Frank Gifford, and Dan Dierdorf

Falcons quarterback Chris Miller completed the game-winning 61-yard touchdown pass to wide receiver Michael Haynes with 2:41 left in the contest. Miller completed 18 out of 30 passes for 291 yards and 3 touchdowns. The Saints went to the playoffs in the following 1992 season, but lost in the NFC Wild Card to the Eagles 36-20.

== Awards and records ==
- Pat Swilling, NFL Defensive Player of the Year
- Led NFL, Fewest Points Allowed, 211 points
