= 1985 New Orleans Saints season =

NFL team season

- Owner: Tom Benson
- General manager: Bum Phillips
- Head coach: Bum Phillips (weeks 1–12); Wade Phillips (interim, weeks 13–16)
- Home stadium: Louisiana Superdome

Results
- Record: 5–11
- Division place: 3rd NFC West
- Playoffs: Did not qualify
- Pro Bowlers: LB Rickey Jackson; K Morten Andersen

The 1985 New Orleans Saints season was the Saints 19th season.

The offseason began with rampant rumors the franchise was on its way out of town. Original owner John W. Mecom Jr. was anxious to sell the team, and he threatened to move to Jacksonville, Florida if no suitable owner could be found.

In May, local car magnate Tom Benson stepped up and pledged to meet Mecom's asking price of $70 million. Mecom and Benson sat down with Louisiana governor Edwin W. Edwards and hammered out a deal, which was finalized May 31. Prior to the sale to Benson, businessman Abram Nicholas Pritzker attempted to purchase the team, but he could not meet Mecom's asking price, and Edwards was unable to secure a loan from the Louisiana Legislature to assist Pritzker.

Benson moved training camp from Vero Beach, Florida to Louisiana Tech University in Ruston. The team quickly brought in local legend and United States Football League standout Bobby Hebert to compete with Richard Todd and Dave Wilson for the starting quarterback position. Hebert won the position late in the season and started the final five games.

Coach Bum Phillips offered to resign when Benson completed his purchase, but Benson declined the offer. The season got off to a disastrous start, as the Saints were routed 47–27 at home by the Kansas City Chiefs, and an angry woman poured a cup of beer on Phillips as he exited the field. The Saints won three consecutive games following a week two loss at Denver, but the season quickly turned sour, thanks to a six-game losing streak that dropped the club to 3–8.

One day after winning at Minnesota to end the skid, Phillips resigned. His son, defensive coordinator Wade Phillips, took over as interim coach for the final four games. The Saints won their first game under the younger Phillips, routing the eventual NFC West champion Los Angeles Rams 29–3, but losses to the Cardinals, 49ers and Falcons ended the year on another glum note.

The Saints finished with a non-winning record for the nineteenth time in as many seasons, going 5–11. Benson promised big changes following the campaign, which he delivered upon.

== Offseason ==
=== NFL draft ===
1985 New Orleans Saints draft
Round	Pick	Player	Position	College	Notes
1	24	Alvin Toles	Linebacker	Tennessee	
2	38	Daren Gilbert	Offensive tackle	Cal State Fullerton	
3	68	Jack Del Rio *	Linebacker	USC	
4	95	Billy Allen	Defensive back	Florida State	
7	179	Eric Martin *	Wide receiver	LSU	
8	206	Joe Kohlbrand	Linebacker	Miami (FL)	
9	236	Earl Johnson	Defensive back	South Carolina	
12	320	Treg Songy	Defensive back	Tulane	
Made roster * Made at least one Pro Bowl during career

== Personnel ==
=== Staff ===
1985 New Orleans Saints staff
Front office: Owner – Tom Benson; President – Eddie Jones; Director of football operations – Pat Peppler; Head coaches: Head coach/general manager – Bum Phillips; Offensive coaches: Offensive coordinator – King Hill; Offensive backfield – John Levra; Wide receivers – Harold Richardson; Offensive line – Carl Mauck; Quality control – Joe Spencer	Defensive coaches: Defensive coordinator – Wade Phillips; Defensive line – Willie Zapalac; Linebackers – John Paul Young; Defensive backfield – Mark Hatley; Strength and conditioning: Strength and conditioning – Russell Paternostro

=== Roster ===
1985 New Orleans Saints roster
Quarterbacks (QB): 3 Bobby Hebert; 11 Richard Todd; Running backs (RB): 22 Tyrone Anthony; 35 Earl Campbell; 43 Bobby Fowler; 30 Wayne Wilson; Wide receivers (WR): 88 Eugene Goodlow; 86 Jeff Groth; 84 Eric Martin; 19 Guido Merkens; 80 Mike Miller; Tight ends (TE): 85 Hoby Brenner; 87 Larry Hardy; 82 John Tice	Offensive linemen (OL): 67 Stan Brock T; 63 Brad Edelman G; 77 Daren Gilbert T; 61 Joel Hilgenberg C; 60 Steve Korte C; 64 Dave LaFary T; 70 Jim Rourke T; 65 Adam Schreiber G; 79 Ralph Williams G; Defensive linemen (DL): 75 Bruce Clark DE; 99 Tony Elliott NT; 97 Jumpy Geathers DE; 74 Derland Moore NT; 73 Frank Warren DE; 94 Jim Wilks DE	Linebackers (LB): 50 Jack Del Rio ILB; 92 James Haynes OLB; 57 Rickey Jackson OLB; 55 Joe Kohlbrand OLB; 51 Whitney Paul OLB; 58 Glen Redd ILB; 54 Alvin Toles ILB; Defensive backs (DB): 24 Terry Hoage SS; 21 Earl Johnson CB; 39 Brett Maxie FS; 25 Johnnie Poe CB; 26 Willie Tullis CB; 49 Frank Wattelet FS; 44 Dave Waymer CB; Special teams (ST): 7 Morten Andersen K; 10 Brian Hansen P	Reserve: -- Rob Bennett TE (IR); 68 Kelvin Clark G (IR); 46 Hokie Gajan RB (IR); 20 Russell Gary S (IR); 53 Scott Pelluer LB (IR); 71 Petey Perot G (IR); 47 David Rackley CB (IR); 83 Carl Roaches WR (IR); 18 Dave Wilson QB (IR); 89 Tyrone Young WR (IR); Rookies in italics

== Regular season ==
=== Schedule ===
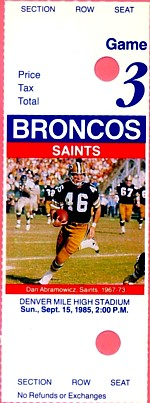
A ticket for a September 15, 1985 game between the Saints and the Denver Broncos.

Week	Date	Opponent	Result	Record	Venue	Attendance
1	September 8	Kansas City Chiefs	**L** 27–47	0–1	Louisiana Superdome	57,760
2	September 15	at Denver Broncos	**L** 23–34	0–2	Mile High Stadium	74,488
3	September 22	Tampa Bay Buccaneers	**W** 20–13	1–2	Louisiana Superdome	45,320
4	September 29	at San Francisco 49ers	**W** 20–17	2–2	Candlestick Park	58,053
5	October 6	Philadelphia Eagles	**W** 23–21	3–2	Louisiana Superdome	56,364
6	October 13	at Los Angeles Raiders	**L** 13–23	3–3	Los Angeles Memorial Coliseum	48,152
7	October 20	at Atlanta Falcons	**L** 24–31	3–4	Atlanta–Fulton County Stadium	44,784
8	October 27	New York Giants	**L** 13–21	3–5	Louisiana Superdome	54,082
9	November 3	at Los Angeles Rams	**L** 10–28	3–6	Anaheim Stadium	49,030
10	November 10	Seattle Seahawks	**L** 3–27	3–7	Louisiana Superdome	47,365
11	November 17	at Green Bay Packers	**L** 14–38	3–8	Milwaukee County Stadium	52,104
12	November 24	at Minnesota Vikings	**W** 30–23	4–8	Hubert H. Humphrey Metrodome	54,117
13	December 1	Los Angeles Rams	**W** 29–3	5–8	Louisiana Superdome	44,122
14	December 8	at St. Louis Cardinals	**L** 16–28	5–9	Busch Memorial Stadium	29,527
15	December 15	San Francisco 49ers	**L** 19–31	5–10	Louisiana Superdome	46,065
16	December 22	Atlanta Falcons	**L** 10–16	5–11	Louisiana Superdome	37,717
Note: Intra-division opponents are in **bold** text.

=== Game summaries ===
==== Week 8 ====
Team	1	2	3	4	Total
• Giants	0	7	0	14	21
Saints	3	0	0	10	13

- Date: October 27
- Location: Louisiana Superdome, New Orleans, Louisiana
- Game start: 3:00 p.m.
- Game weather: Indoors (dome)
- Referee: Bob Frederic
- TV announcers (CBS): Pat Summerall John Madden

==== Week 12 ====
Team	1	2	3	4	Total
• Saints	14	6	3	7	30
Vikings	7	3	3	10	23

- Date: November 24
- Location: Hubert H. Humphrey Metrodome, Minneapolis, MN
- Game start: 1:00 p.m.
- Game weather: Indoors (dome)
- Referee: Fred Silva
- TV announcers (CBS): Dick Stockton and Wayne Walker

Scoring summary
Q1	NO	Wilson 41 yard run (Andersen kick)	NO 7–0
Q1	MIN	Anderson 54 yard pass from Kramer (Stenerud kick)	Tie 7–7
Q1	NO	Campbell 4 yard run (Andersen kick)	NO 14–7
Q2	NO	Andersen 26 yard field goal	NO 17–7
Q2	NO	Andersen 47 yard field goal	NO 20–7
Q2	MIN	Stenerud 22 yard field goal	NO 20–10
Q3	NO	Andersen 45 yard field goal	NO 23–10
Q3	MIN	Stenerud 22 yard field goal	NO 23–13
Q4	MIN	Stenerud 37 yard field goal	NO 23–16
Q4	MIN	Jones 6 yard pass from Kramer (Stenerud kick)	Tie 23–23
Q4	NO	Tice 39 yard pass from Hebert (Andersen kick)	NO 30–23

- Earl Campbell 35 Rush, 160 Yds

==== Week 15 ====
Team	1	2	3	4	Total
• 49ers	0	7	10	14	31
Saints	0	9	7	3	19

- Date: December 15
- Location: Louisiana Superdome, New Orleans, LA
- Game start: 1:00 p.m. EST
- Game attendance: 46,065
- Game weather: Indoors (dome)
- Referee: Ben Dreith

Scoring summary
Q2	SF	Clark 26 yard pass from Montana (Wersching kick)	SF 7–0
Q2	NO	Andersen 46 yard field goal	SF 7–3
Q2	NO	Warren 42 yard blocked field goal return (kick failed)	NO 9–7
Q3	SF	Wilson 52 yard pass from Montana (Wersching kick)	SF 14–9
Q3	NO	Goodlow 76 yard pass from Hebert (Andersen kick)	NO 16–14
Q3	SF	Wersching 24 yard field goal	SF 17–16
Q4	NO	Andersen 41 yard field goal	NO 19–17
Q4	SF	Francis 17 yard pass from Montana (Wersching kick)	SF 24–19
Q4	SF	Craig 15 yard run (Wersching kick)	SF 31–19

- Joe Montana 25/38, 354 Yds

=== Standings ===
NFC West
	W	L	T	PCT	DIV	CONF	PF	PA	STK
Los Angeles Rams^{(2)}	11	5	0	.688	3–3	8–4	340	277	L1
San Francisco 49ers^{(5)}	10	6	0	.625	4–2	7–5	411	263	W2
New Orleans Saints	5	11	0	.313	2–4	5–7	294	401	L3
Atlanta Falcons	4	12	0	.250	3–3	4–8	282	452	W2

== Notable events ==
On opening day, quarterback Dave Wilson set the unwanted record of completing only two of twenty-two passes: the lowest pass completion percent in an NFL game for any quarterback with a double figure total of attempts.
