= 1984 New Orleans Saints season =

NFL team season

- Owner: John Mecom Jr.
- General manager: Bum Phillips
- Head coach: Bum Phillips
- Home stadium: Louisiana Superdome

Results
- Record: 7–9
- Division place: 3rd NFC West
- Playoffs: Did not qualify
- Pro Bowlers: DE Bruce Clark; LB Rickey Jackson; P Brian Hansen

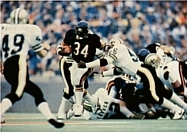
The Saints playing against the Chicago Bears during a 1984 away game at Soldier Field.

The 1984 New Orleans Saints season was the team's 18th as a member of the National Football League. They were unable to improve on their previous season's output of 8–8, winning only seven games. The team failed to qualify for the playoffs for the eighteenth consecutive season. The Saints started out winning three of their first five games. However, the Saints would struggle as newly acquired quarterback Richard Todd threw 19 interceptions to just 11 touchdowns as the Saints again finished the season with a losing record at 7-9. It was in week 6 against the Bears that Walter Payton passed Jim Brown to become the NFL's all-time leading rusher.

Todd was acquired from the New York Jets for a first-round draft choice, and he beat out the aging Ken Stabler for the starting job at training camp, the Saints' last at Vero Beach, Florida. Stabler, who was inducted into the Pro Football Hall of Fame in 2016, retired midway through the season. Todd and Stabler both played for the Alabama Crimson Tide under coach Bear Bryant.

Following the loss to the Bears, the Saints traded for Houston Oilers running back Earl Campbell, reuniting the number one selection in the 1978 draft and 1977 Heisman Trophy winner with coach Bum Phillips, the Oilers' coach from 1975-80. Campbell joined 1980 Heisman recipient and 1981 first overall selection George Rogers in the New Orleans backfield.

Late in the season, owner John Mecom Jr., who purchased the Saints as an expansion franchise for $8.5 million in late 1966, announced he would sell the team, with an asking price of $70 million ($212 million in 2024 dollars). Fears abounded across Louisiana the team would be moved to Jacksonville if Mecom could not find a local buyer. Eventually, the team was sold in early 1985 to New Orleans native and car magnate Tom Benson, with Louisiana Governor Edwin Edwards brokering the deal.

== Offseason ==
=== NFL draft ===
1984 New Orleans Saints draft
Round	Pick	Player	Position	College	Notes
2	42	Jumpy Geathers	Defensive end	Wichita State	
3	68	Terry Hoage	Free Safety	Georgia	
3	69	Tyrone Anthony	Running back	North Carolina	
4	97	Joel Hilgenberg *	Center	Iowa	
5	123	Jitter Fields	Defensive back	Texas	
6	156	Don Thorp	Defensive tackle	Illinois	
8	210	Clemon Terrell	Running back	Southern Miss	
9	237	Brian Hansen *	Punter	Sioux Falls	
10	264	Paul Gray	Linebacker	Western Kentucky	
11	291	Michel Bourgeau	Defensive end	Boise State	
12	324	Byron Nelson	Offensive tackle	Arizona	
Made roster * Made at least one Pro Bowl during career

== Personnel ==
=== Staff ===
1984 New Orleans Saints staff
Front office: Owner – John Mecom Jr.; President – Eddie Jones; Director of football operations – Pat Peppler; Head coaches: Head Coach/General Manager – Bum Phillips; Offensive coaches: Offensive coordinator – King Hill; Offensive backfield – John Levra; Receivers – Lamar McHan; Offensive line – Carl Mauck; Quality control – Joe Spencer	Defensive coaches: Defensive coordinator – Wade Phillips; Defensive line – Willie Zapalac; Linebackers – John Paul Young; Defensive backfield – Lance Van Zandt; Special teams coaches: Special teams – Harold Richardson; Strength and conditioning: Strength and Conditioning – Russell Paternostro

=== Roster ===
1984 New Orleans Saints roster
Quarterbacks (QB): 19 Guido Merkens; 11 Richard Todd; 18 Dave Wilson; Running backs (RB): 22 Tyrone Anthony; 35 Earl Campbell; 46 Hokie Gajan; 38 George Rogers; 41 Jimmy Rogers; 30 Wayne Wilson; Wide receivers (WR): 88 Eugene Goodlow; 86 Jeff Groth; 80 Lindsay Scott; 89 Tyrone Young; Tight ends (TE): 85 Hoby Brenner; 87 Larry Hardy; 84 Junior Miller	Offensive linemen (OL): 65 David Carter G/C; 78 Kelvin Clark T/G; 63 Brad Edelman G; 61 Joel Hilgenberg C; 62 John Hill C; 60 Steve Korte G/C; 68 Louis Oubre G; 76 Jim Pietrzak T; 72 Chris Ward T; Defensive linemen (DL): 75 Bruce Clark DE; 99 Tony Elliott NT; 97 Jumpy Geathers DE; 98 Reggie Lewis DE; 73 Frank Warren DE; 94 Jim Wilks DE	Linebackers (LB): 92 James Haynes OLB; 57 Rickey Jackson OLB; 52 Jim Kovach ILB; 51 Whitney Paul OLB; 53 Scott Pelluer OLB; 58 Glen Redd ILB; 56 Dennis Winston ILB; Defensive backs (DB): 26 Jitter Fields CB; 20 Russell Gary SS; 28 Greg Harding SS; 24 Terry Hoage FS; 34 Bobby Johnson CB; 29 Rodney Lewis CB; 25 Johnnie Poe CB; 49 Frank Wattelet FS; 44 Dave Waymer CB; Special teams (ST): 7 Morten Andersen K; 10 Brian Hansen P	Reserve: 67 Stan Brock T (IR); 83 Kenny Duckett WR (NF-Ill.); 64 Dave Lafary T (IR); 93 Gary Lewis NT (IR); 74 Derland Moore NT (IR); 96 Don Thorp NT (IR); 82 John Tice TE (IR); 45 Tim Wilson RB (IR); Rookies in italics

== Regular season ==
=== Transactions ===
- October 10, 1984: The New Orleans Saints in exchange for their top choice in the 1985 NFL draft to the Houston Oilers in exchange for running back Earl Campbell.

=== Schedule ===
Week	Date	Opponent	Result	Record	Venue	Attendance
1	September 2	Atlanta Falcons	**L** 28–36	0–1	Louisiana Superdome	66,652
2	September 9	Tampa Bay Buccaneers	**W** 17–13	1–1	Louisiana Superdome	54,686
3	September 16	at San Francisco 49ers	**L** 20–30	1–2	Candlestick Park	57,611
4	September 23	St. Louis Cardinals	**W** 34–24	2–2	Louisiana Superdome	58,723
5	September 30	at Houston Oilers	**W** 27–10	3–2	Astrodome	43,108
6	October 7	at Chicago Bears	**L** 7–20	3–3	Soldier Field	53,752
7	October 14	Los Angeles Rams	**L** 10–28	3–4	Louisiana Superdome	63,161
8	October 21	at Dallas Cowboys	**L** 27–30 (OT)	3–5	Texas Stadium	50,966
9	October 28	at Cleveland Browns	**W** 16–14	4–5	Cleveland Municipal Stadium	52,489
10	November 4	Green Bay Packers	**L** 13–23	4–6	Louisiana Superdome	57,426
11	November 11	at Atlanta Falcons	**W** 17–13	5–6	Atlanta–Fulton County Stadium	40,590
12	November 19	Pittsburgh Steelers	**W** 27–24	6–6	Louisiana Superdome	66,005
13	November 25	San Francisco 49ers	**L** 3–35	6–7	Louisiana Superdome	65,177
14	December 2	at Los Angeles Rams	**L** 21–34	6–8	Anaheim Stadium	49,348
15	December 9	Cincinnati Bengals	**L** 21–24	6–9	Louisiana Superdome	40,855
16	December 15	at New York Giants	**W** 10–3	7–9	Giants Stadium	63,739
Note: Intra-division opponents are in **bold** text.

== Season summary ==
=== Week 1 ===
Team	1	2	3	4	Total
• Falcons	5	14	7	10	36
Saints	7	14	0	7	28

- Date: September 2
- Location: Louisiana Superdome
- Game weather: Indoors (dome)
- Referee: Gene Barth
- TV announcers (CBS): Frank Glieber and Dick Vermeil

=== Week 2 ===
Team	1	2	3	4	Total
Buccaneers	7	3	3	0	13
• Saints	0	7	3	7	17

- Date: September 9
- Location: Louisiana Superdome
- Game weather: Indoors (dome)
- Referee: Gordon McCarter

==== Week 3 (Sunday, September 16, 1984): at San Francisco 49ers ====
Week 3: New Orleans Saints at San Francisco 49ers

Quarter	1	2	3	4	Total
Saints (1–2)	0	10	10	0	20
49ers (3–0)	7	10	0	13	30

at Candlestick Park • San Francisco, California

- Date: September 16, 1984
- Game time: 1:00 p.m. PDT
- Game weather: 65 °F (18 °C); wind 16 mph
- Game attendance: 57,611
- Referee: Tom Dooley
- TV announcers (CBS): Tom Brookshier (play-by-play) and Wayne Walker (color commentator)
- Pro-Football-Reference.com

Team	Category	Player	Statistics
NO	Passing	Ken Stabler	14/27, 157 YDS, 2 TDs, 2 INTs
NO	Rushing	George Rogers	23 CAR, 88 YDS
NO	Receiving	Eugene Goodlow	6 REC, 62 YDS, 1 TD
SF	Passing	Joe Montana	10/17, 128 YDS, 1 TD, 1 INT
SF	Rushing	Wendell Tyler	10 CAR, 82 YDS, 1 TD
SF	Receiving	Freddie Solomon	3 REC, 72 YDS, 1 TD

Scoring summary

Quarter	Time	Drive			Team	Scoring information	Score	
Quarter	Time	Plays	Yards	TOP	Team	Scoring information	NO	SF
1	9:04				49ers	Solomon 32-yard touchdown reception from Montana, Wersching kick good	0	7
2	14:57				49ers	31-yard field goal by Wersching	0	10
1	9:06				49ers	Tyler 3-yard touchdown run, Wersching kick good	0	17
2	1:20				Saints	Goodlow 8-yard touchdown reception from Stabler, Andersen kick good	7	17
2	0:00				Saints	32-yard field goal by Andersen	10	17
3	11:11				Saints	Brenner 26-yard touchdown reception from Stabler, Andersen kick good	17	17
3	3:11				Saints	41-yard field goal by Andersen	20	17
4	9:33				49ers	Cooper 23-yard touchdown reception from Cavanaugh, Wersching kick good	20	24
4	7:45				49ers	22-yard field goal by Wersching	20	27
4	1:56				49ers	30-yard field goal by Wersching	20	30
"TOP" = time of possession. For other American football terms, see Glossary of American football.							20	30

- Point spread: 49ers by 5½
- Over/under: 45.0 (over)
- Time of game:

Saints	Game statistics	49ers
20	First downs	19
31–119	Rushes–yards	32–148
162	Passing yards	179
16–34–5	Passes	13–26–1
2–13	Sacked–yards	3–20
149	Net passing yards	159
268	Total yards	307
166	Return yards	160
3–46.0	Punts	5–40.8
0–0	Fumbles–lost	0–0
4–47	Penalties–yards	6–54
31:38	Time of Possession	28:22

=== Week 4 ===
Team	1	2	3	4	Total
Cardinals	0	7	7	10	24
• Saints	10	3	7	14	34

- Date: September 23
- Location: Louisiana Superdome
- Game weather: Indoors (dome)
- Referee: Jim Tunney
- TV announcers (CBS): Verne Lundquist and Terry Bradshaw

=== Week 5 ===
Team	1	2	3	4	Total
• Saints	14	3	0	10	27
Oilers	0	0	3	7	10

- Date: September 30
- Location: Astrodome
- Game start: 12:00 p.m. CDT
- Game weather: Indoors (dome)
- Referee: Bob Frederic

=== Week 6 ===
Team	1	2	3	4	Total
Saints	0	7	0	0	7
• Bears	6	7	0	7	20

- Date: October 7
- Location: Soldier Field
- Game start: 12:00 pm CDT
- Referee: Bob McElwee
- TV announcers (CBS): Tim Ryan and Johnny Morris

=== Week 7 ===
Team	1	2	3	4	Total
• Rams	0	21	7	0	28
Saints	3	0	0	7	10

- Date: October 14
- Location: Louisiana Superdome
- Game weather: Indoors (dome)
- Referee: Chuck Heberling
- TV announcers (CBS): Dick Stockton and Hank Stram

=== Week 8 ===
Team	1	2	3	4	OT	Total
Saints	0	17	10	0	0	27
• Cowboys	3	3	0	21	3	30

- Date: October 21
- Location: Texas Stadium
- Game start: 8:45 pm CST
- Referee: Pat Haggerty
- TV announcers (ABC): Frank Gifford, Don Meredith and O. J. Simpson

=== Week 9 ===
Team	1	2	3	4	Total
• Saints	0	10	0	6	16
Browns	0	7	7	0	14

- Date: October 28
- Location: Cleveland Municipal Stadium
- Game start: 1:00 p.m. EST
- Referee: Jerry Seeman
- TV announcers (CBS): Verne Lundquist and Terry Bradshaw

=== Week 10 ===
Team	1	2	3	4	Total
• Packers	0	10	10	3	23
Saints	7	3	0	3	13

- Date: November 4
- Location: Louisiana Superdome
- Game start: 12:00 pm CST
- Game weather: Indoors (dome)
- Referee: Jim Tunney
- TV announcers (CBS): Frank Glieber and Dick Vermeil

=== Week 11 ===
Team	1	2	3	4	Total
• Saints	10	0	0	7	17
Falcons	0	10	3	0	13

- Date: November 11
- Location: Atlanta–Fulton County Stadium
- Referee: Dick Jorgensen

=== Week 12 ===
Team	1	2	3	4	Total
Steelers	0	14	0	10	24
• Saints	3	10	0	14	27

- Date: November 19
- Location: Louisiana Superdome
- Game start: 8:00 pm CST
- Game weather: Indoors (dome)
- Referee: Fred Silva
- TV announcers (ABC): Frank Gifford, Don Meredith and O. J. Simpson

==== Week 13 (Sunday, November 25, 1984): vs. San Francisco 49ers ====
Week 13: San Francisco 49ers at New Orleans Saints

Quarter	1	2	3	4	Total
49ers (12–1)	0	7	14	14	35
Saints (6–7)	0	3	0	0	3

at Louisiana Superdome • New Orleans, Louisiana

- Date: November 25, 1984
- Game time: 3:00 p.m. CST
- Game weather: indoors
- Game attendance: 65,177
- Referee: Jerry Markbreit
- TV announcers (CBS): Verne Lundquist (play-by-play) and Terry Bradshaw (color commentator)
- Pro-Football-Reference.com

Team	Category	Player	Statistics
SF	Passing	Joe Montana	14/30, 177 YDS, 2 TDs
SF	Rushing	Wendell Tyler	15 CAR, 117 YDS
SF	Receiving	Freddie Solomon	3 REC, 63 YDS, 1 TD
NO	Passing	Richard Todd	9/18, 72 YDS, 1 INT
NO	Rushing	George Rogers	21 CAR, 88 YDS
NO	Receiving	Tyrone Anthony	4 REC, 31 YDS

Scoring summary

Quarter	Time	Drive			Team	Scoring information	Score	
Quarter	Time	Plays	Yards	TOP	Team	Scoring information	SF	NO
2	5:43				49ers	Craig 1-yard touchdown run, Wersching kick good	7	0
2	2:18				Saints	27-yard field goal by Andersen	7	3
3	8:36				49ers	Cooper 19-yard touchdown reception from Montana, Wersching kick good	14	3
3	6:52				49ers	Solomon 28-yard touchdown reception from Montana, Wersching kick good	21	3
4	11:35	—	—	—	49ers	Interception returned 53 yards for touchdown by Shell, Wersching kick good	28	3
4	10:39				49ers	Ring 1-yard touchdown run, Wersching kick good	35	3
"TOP" = time of possession. For other American football terms, see Glossary of American football.							35	3

- Point spread: 49ers by 2
- Over/under: 42.0 (under)
- Time of game:

49ers	Game statistics	Saints
22	First downs	12
33–219	Rushes–yards	28–131
201	Passing yards	118
15–32–0	Passes	14–26–1
1–13	Sacked–yards	8–48
188	Net passing yards	70
407	Total yards	201
107	Return yards	113
6–44.3	Punts	8–45.5
1–0	Fumbles–lost	1–0
4–60	Penalties–yards	3–20
27:48	Time of Possession	32:12

=== Week 14 ===
Team	1	2	3	4	Total
Saints	0	7	0	14	21
• Rams	14	10	3	7	34

- Date: December 2
- Location: Anaheim Stadium
- Referee: Tom Dooley

=== Week 15 ===
Team	1	2	3	4	Total
• Bengals	0	3	14	7	24
Saints	0	7	7	7	21

- Date: December 9
- Location: Louisiana Superdome
- Game start: 12:00 p.m. CST
- Game weather: Indoors (dome)
- Referee: Gene Barth
- TV announcers (NBC): Gary Gerould and Harvey Martin

=== Week 16 ===
Team	1	2	3	4	Total
• Saints	7	0	0	3	10
Giants	0	3	0	0	3

- Date: December 15
- Location: Giants Stadium
- Game start: 12:30 pm EST
- Referee: Fred Wyant
- TV announcers (CBS): Frank Glieber and Dick Vermeil

Scoring summary
Q1	8:54	NO	Gajan 2 yard pass from Wilson (Andersen kick)	NO 7–0
Q2	14:31	NYG	Haji-Sheikh 37 yard field goal	NO 7–3
Q4	13:55	NO	Andersen 37 yard field goal	NO 10–3

== Standings ==
NFC West
	W	L	T	PCT	DIV	CONF	PF	PA	STK
^{(1)} San Francisco 49ers	15	1	0	.938	6–0	12–0	475	227	W9
^{(4)} Los Angeles Rams	10	6	0	.625	3–3	7–5	346	316	L1
New Orleans Saints	7	9	0	.438	1–5	4–8	298	361	W1
Atlanta Falcons	4	12	0	.250	2–4	3–9	281	382	W1
