= Bobby Hebert =

American football player and sportscaster (born 1960)

No. 3, 11 ,10
- Position: Quarterback

Personal information
- Born: August 19, 1960 (age 66); Galliano, Louisiana, U.S.
- Listed height: 6 ft 4 in (1.93 m)
- Listed weight: 215 lb (98 kg)

Career information
- High school: South Lafourche (Cut Off, Louisiana)
- College: Northwestern State (1979–1982)
- NFL draft: 1983: undrafted

Career history
- Michigan Panthers (1983–1984); Oakland Invaders (1985); New Orleans Saints (1985–1992); Atlanta Falcons (1993–1996)

Awards and highlights
- Pro Bowl (1993); New Orleans Saints Hall of Fame; USFL champion (1983); USFL Championship Game MVP (1983); USFL Most Outstanding Quarterback (1983); Sporting News USFL P.O.Y (1983); USFL second-team All-Time Team; USFL record 10,039 career passing yards; Northwestern State N-Club Hall of Fame; Louisiana Sports Hall of Fame

Career NFL statistics
- Passing attempts: 3,121
- Passing completions: 1,839
- Completion percentage: 58.9%
- TD–INT: 135–124
- Passing yards: 21,683
- Passer rating: 78
- Rushing yards: 602
- Rushing touchdowns: 1
- Stats at Pro Football Reference

Bobby Joseph Hebert Jr. (surname pronounced AY-bair /ˈeɪbɛər/; born August 19, 1960) is an American sportscaster and former professional football quarterback. He played in the United States Football League (USFL) and National Football League (NFL) from 1983 to 1996 for the Michigan Panthers, Oakland Invaders, New Orleans Saints, and Atlanta Falcons. Nicknamed "the Cajun Cannon", Hebert led the Panthers to the USFL championship in the league's inaugural season. Later he helped bring the Saints their first winning season and playoff appearance in franchise history. Hebert was inducted to the New Orleans Saints Hall of Fame in 1999 and the Louisiana Sports Hall of Fame in 2000. He currently hosts an afternoon radio show on WWL AM 870 and WWL-FM 105.3 in New Orleans.

== Playing career ==
=== USFL ===
Hebert was among the greatest quarterbacks in the USFL's short history. In 1983, he won the USFL championship with the Michigan Panthers, defeating the Philadelphia Stars, 24–22. The team struggled with injuries in 1984 and a weakened squad was knocked out of the playoffs by Steve Young's Los Angeles Express 27–21 in triple overtime. In 1985, the Panthers were merged with the Oakland Invaders and Hebert again led his team to the finals against the Stars. This time Hebert's team fell short and the Stars won 28–24. In three years in the USFL, Hebert completed 773 of 1,407 passes for 13,137 passing yards. He is the USFL's all-time leader in passing yardage.

USFLOnline.com: Hebert remembers when the Panthers were the “Talk-of-the-Town” in the city of Detroit. “We were a lot more popular than the Lions were,” he says. “We won the USFL Championship after Detroit not having a champion since the Bobby Layne days in the 1950s.”

Hebert, with a confident tone in his voice, says, “I think we would have been in the top 14 of the NFL if we [Panthers] played them. We didn't have the depth as the NFL, but we had a good chance to win because the guys that started on the Panthers also started in the NFL later on.”

=== NFL ===
In 1985, his rookie season with the NFL's New Orleans Saints, and in 1986, he split time with quarterback Dave Wilson. In 1987, he was made starting quarterback with John Fourcade as backup. In week 12 of the 1988 NFL Season on November 20, Hebert completed 20 of 23 passes for 194 yards and 3 touchdown passes in the Saints' 42–0 rout over the Denver Broncos, for his efforts he was named the Associated Press NFC Offensive Player of the week. Hebert sat out the entire 1990 season in a contract dispute. In 1991 and 1992 he led the Saints to excellent starts and impressive playoff appearances. Hebert was honored by gracing the front cover of the October 7, 1991 Sports Illustrated. In 1993, he was signed by the Atlanta Falcons and was selected for the Pro Bowl that season. He continued to play for the Atlanta Falcons as a backup to Jeff George in 1994 and 1995, and he was named starter again in 1996. Hebert retired after his 1996 season with the Falcons.

== Career statistics ==
=== USFL ===
Year	Team	Games		Passing							
Year	Team	GP	Record	Cmp	Att	Pct	Yds	Avg	TD	Int	Rtg
1983	Michigan Panthers	18	12–6	257	451	57.0	3,568	7.9	27	17	86.8
1984	Michigan Panthers	18	10−8	272	500	54.4	3,758	7.5	24	22	76.4
1985	Oakland Invaders	18	13–4–1	244	456	53.5	3,811	8.4	30	19	86.1
Career		54	35−18–1	773	1,407	54.9	11,137	7.9	81	58	83.1

==== Postseason ====
Year	Team	Games			Passing						
Year	Team	GP	GS	Record	Cmp	Att	Pct	Yds	Avg	TD	Int
1983	Michigan Panthers	2	2	2–0	38	66	57.6	609	9.2	4	2
1984	Michigan Panthers	1	1	0–1	13	27	48.1	201	7.4	1	0
1985	Oakland Invaders	3	3	2–1	47	90	52.2	745	8.2	5	4
Career		6	6	4-2	98	183	53.6	1555	8.5	10	6

=== NFL ===
Legend
	Pro Bowl attendee
	Led the league
**Bold**	Career high

==== Regular season ====
Year	Team	Games			Passing								
Year	Team	GP	GS	Record	Cmp	Att	Pct	Yds	Avg	TD	Int	Lng	Rtg
1985	NO	6	6	2−4	97	181	53.6	1,208	6.7	5	4	76	74.6
1986	NO	5	3	1−2	41	79	51.9	498	6.3	2	8	84	40.5
1987	NO	12	12	10−2	164	294	55.8	2,119	7.2	15	9	67	82.9
1988	NO	**16**	**16**	10−6	280	478	58.6	3,156	6.6	20	15	40	79.3
1989	NO	14	13	6−7	222	353	**62.9**	2,686	7.6	15	15	54	82.7
1990	NO	Did not play due to contract dispute											
1991	NO	9	9	8−1	149	248	60.1	1,676	6.8	9	8	65	79.0
1992	NO	**16**	**16**	**12–4**	249	422	59.0	**3,287**	7.8	19	16	72	82.9
1993	ATL	14	12	4−8	263	430	61.2	2,978	6.9	**24**	17	**98**	84.0
1994	ATL	8	0	—	52	103	50.5	610	5.9	2	6	40	51.0
1995	ATL	4	0	—	28	45	62.2	313	7.0	2	1	37	**88.5**
1996	ATL	14	13	3–10	**294**	**488**	60.2	3,152	6.5	22	**25**	57	72.9
Career		118	100	56–44	1,839	3,121	58.9	21,683	6.9	135	124	98	78.0

==== Postseason ====
Year	Team	Games			Passing							
Year	Team	GP	GS	Record	Cmp	Att	Pct	Yds	Avg	TD	Int	Rtg
1987	NO	**1**	**1**	**0–1**	9	19	47.4	84	4.4	**1**	2	37.9
1991	NO	**1**	**1**	**0–1**	**26**	**44**	**59.1**	273	6.2	**1**	2	**65.8**
1992	NO	**1**	**1**	**0–1**	23	39	59.0	**291**	**7.5**	**1**	**3**	58.8
Career		3	3	0–3	58	102	56.9	648	6.4	3	7	57.1

== Personal life ==
Hebert's niece, Erin is married to former LSU quarterback, Myles Brennan. His son, T-Bob Hebert played football at LSU and currently works for Barstool Sports.
