= Bum Phillips =

American football coach (1923–2013)

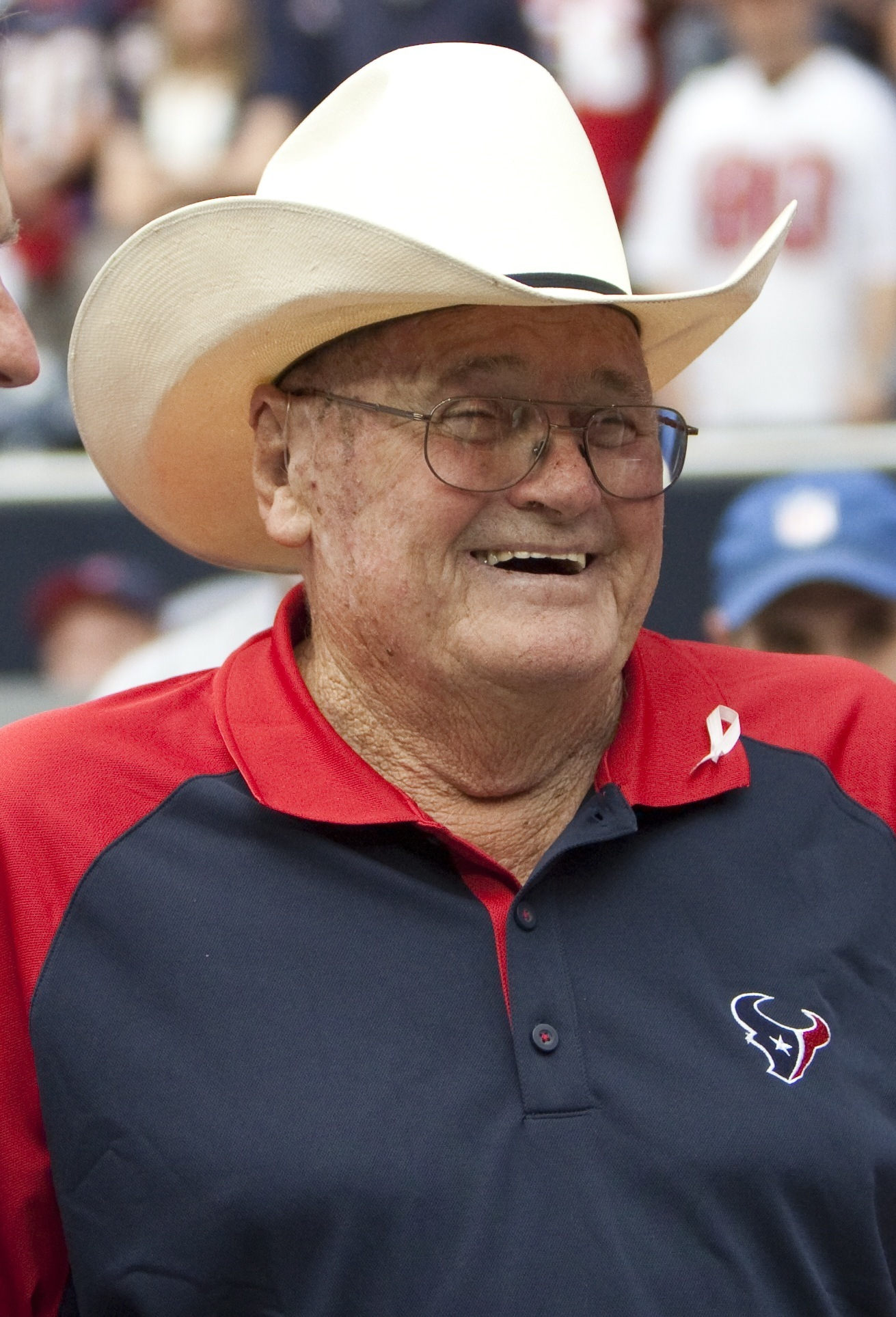
- Phillips in 2010

Personal information
- Born: September 29, 1923; Orange, Texas, U.S.
- Died: October 18, 2013 (aged 90); Goliad, Texas, U.S.
- Listed height: 5 ft 11 in (1.80 m)

Career information
- College: Stephen F. Austin

Career history
- Nederland HS (TX) (1951–1956) Head coach; Texas A&M (1957) Assistant coach; Jacksonville HS (TX) (1958) Head coach; Amarillo HS (TX) (1959–1961) Head coach; Texas Western (1962) Head coach; Port Neches–Groves HS (TX) (1963–1964) Head coach; Houston (1965–1966) Defensive coordinator; San Diego Chargers (1967–1971) Defensive coordinator; SMU (1972) Defensive coordinator; Oklahoma State (1973) Assistant coach; Houston Oilers (1974) Defensive coordinator; Houston Oilers (1975–1980) Head coach; New Orleans Saints (1981–1985) Head coach

Awards and highlights
- Tennessee Titans Ring of Honor; Texas Sports Hall of Fame

Head coaching record
- Regular season: NFL: 82–77 (.516)
- Postseason: NFL: 4–3 (.571)
- Career: NFL: 86–80 (.518); NCAA: 4–5 (.444)
- Coaching profile at Pro Football Reference
- Executive profile at Pro Football Reference

Oail Andrew "Bum" Phillips Jr. (September 29, 1923 – October 18, 2013) was an American football coach at the high school, college and professional levels. He served as head coach in the National Football League (NFL) for the Houston Oilers from 1975 to 1980 and the New Orleans Saints from 1981 to 1985.

== Early football career ==
Phillips played football at Lamar University in Beaumont, Texas, but enlisted in the U.S. Marine Corps on September 30, 1942. He became one of the elite Marine Raiders. He served on Guadalcanal and the battle of Vangunu.

After he returned from the war, Phillips completed the remaining year on his degree at Lamar (a junior college at the time), and enrolled at Stephen F. Austin State University in Nacogdoches, Texas, lettering in football in 1948 and 1949 and graduating with a degree in education in 1949.

During the 1950s and 1960s, Phillips coached high school football in various Texan cities including Nederland, Jacksonville, Amarillo, and Port Neches–Groves.

His college coaching stints included serving as an assistant coach at Texas A&M University (for Bear Bryant), the University of Houston (for Bill Yeoman), Southern Methodist University (for Hayden Fry), and Oklahoma State University with Jim Stanley. He was the head coach at Texas Western University (now the University of Texas at El Paso) for one season in 1962.

== NFL coaching career ==
In the late 1960s, Phillips was hired by Sid Gillman to serve as a defensive assistant coach for the San Diego Chargers. In 1973, Gillman became head coach of the Houston Oilers, and he brought Phillips with him as his defensive coordinator.

Phillips was promoted to head coach of the Oilers on January 25, 1975, and he served in that capacity through 1980. As coach of the Oilers, he presided over the team's most successful era since its days in the American Football League. Under Phillips, the Oilers reached the AFC Championship Game in two consecutive seasons, losing to the Super Bowl champion Pittsburgh Steelers 34–5 in 1978 and 27–13 in 1979. Both teams were members of the competitive AFC Central Division and thus played three times in both 1978 and 1979, fueling an intense rivalry. During this period of league-wide AFC dominance, some commentators considered the Oilers and Steelers to be the two best teams in the NFL. Phillips remarked at the time, "The road to the Super Bowl goes through Pittsburgh."

Phillips was fired on New Year's Eve 1980 by Oilers owner Bud Adams. The 1980 Oilers, at times, had trouble scoring and Phillips refused to hire an offensive coordinator. "I didn't feel like we needed it", he said. At the time his 11 wins that season were the most wins in a season of a coach who would then be fired. His 59 wins would be the most in franchise history until Jeff Fisher passed him in 2001 (by then, the team had become the Tennessee Titans). Soon afterward, he was hired by New Orleans Saints owner John Mecom Jr. as head coach and general manager of the Saints, serving from 1981 through the first 12 games of the 1985 season. As in his coaching tenure with the Oilers, Phillips took off his trademark Stetson inside the Louisiana Superdome. In 1983, his Saints went into the final week needing one more win to secure the first winning season and playoff berth in franchise history. The Rams beat the Saints for the final playoff spot in week 16, 26–24 on Mike Lansford's 42-yard field goal with 00:02 to play.

Phillips offered to resign prior to the 1985 season after Tom Benson purchased the Saints for $70 million from Mecom, but Benson asked him to stay on to help his transition into NFL ownership.

Phillips resigned as Saints coach on November 25, 1985, one day after a 30–23 victory over the Minnesota Vikings, 12 games into the season. His son, Wade Phillips, would take over the coaching reins on an interim basis for the remaining four games of the 1985 season. The Saints defeated the Rams 29–3 in Wade's first game at the helm, but finished with losses to the Cardinals, 49ers and Falcons. He finished his NFL head coaching career with 82 wins, the same number of wins as his son.

== Later life and family ==
Phillips later worked as a football color commentator for television and Oilers radio broadcasts. He subsequently retired to his horse ranch in Goliad, Texas.

His son Wade Phillips has also held assistant and head coaching jobs in the NFL and was the head coach of the Dallas Cowboys from February 2007 to November 2010. Wade was hired by the Houston Texans on January 5, 2011, as their new defensive coordinator almost exactly 30 years after his father was terminated by Oilers owner Bud Adams on December 28, 1980, after the Oilers failed to advance past the first round of the playoffs. Wade won a Super Bowl title at Super Bowl 50 with the Denver Broncos as defensive coordinator and was the defensive coordinator of the Los Angeles Rams, who advanced to Super Bowl LIII and later parted ways with the Rams following the 2019 season.

His grandson Wes is also an NFL assistant coach.

In 2010, he published his memoirs, Bum Phillips: Coach, Cowboy, Christian, which Kirk Lynn used as the basis for his libretto for the 2014 opera Bum Phillips.

== Death ==
Phillips died at his ranch in Goliad, Texas, on October 18, 2013, at the age of 90. He was survived by his second wife Debbie and six children from his first marriage, along with almost two dozen grandchildren.

In honor of Bum Phillips coaching both Nederland and Port Neches–Groves High Schools, the rivalry game between his two favorite schools is named the Bum Phillips Bowl.

== Quotes ==
Phillips was known for his trademark Stetson cowboy hat on the sidelines, except when the Oilers played in the Astrodome or other domed stadiums. He stated that his mother taught him not to wear a hat indoors; his former boss Bear Bryant similarly refused to wear his trademark houndstooth hat during indoor games. Phillips wore his cowboy hat with blue jeans and a button down shirt, in contrast to Dallas Cowboys head coach Tom Landry who wore a suit and tie with his trademark trilby.

Besides his trademark cowboy hat, Phillips is also known for his colorful quotes, such that Sports Illustrated noted that Wikipedia had a whole section of his page dedicated to these quips. In the week leading up to Super Bowl LIII, his son Wade was quoted as saying "Unfortunately, I get older but Tom Brady doesn't", while sporting the elder Phillip's sheepskin coat and cowboy hat as the Los Angeles Rams arrived in Atlanta.

- "There's two kinds of coaches, them that's fired and them that's gonna be fired."
- "I always thought I could coach. I just thought people were poor judges of good coaches."
- "In the country, they don't say 'bumblebees' they say 'bummel bees", on how Bum Phillips really got his name. His aunt JoAnnette could only say 'Bum'.
- "I've never seen a hammer and tong game like that one."
- To a reporter who said, "He sure gets up slow", after Earl Campbell had been tackled. "Yes, but he goes down slow, too."
- "The harder we played the behinder we got."
- "Mama always said that if it can't rain on you, you're indoors." (Explaining why he wouldn't wear his cowboy hat in the Astrodome, the first domed stadium)
- "Dallas Cowboys may be America's team, but the Houston Oilers are Texas' team."
- "I never scrimmage Oilers against Oilers... what for? Houston isn't on our schedule." (Source: The Book of Sports Lists)
- (To an official) "Hey, can I, can I tell you one thing? That's three holding penalties on one football team in a quarter and a half. (Pauses) That ain't funny."
- (To an official) "Now, you can't do that! If you do it, I'm telling you you'll have more hell over it than a little bit."
- (after playing the Steelers for the fifth time in two seasons and planning to meet them a sixth time) "The road to the Super Bowl runs through Pittsburgh, sooner or later you've got to go to Pittsburgh.
- (20 years after playing Pittsburgh six times in two seasons) "Don't take long to spend all the time you want in Pittsburgh."
- (referring to Miami Dolphins coach Don Shula) "He can take his'n and beat your'n and take your'n and beat his'n." He also said the same line about Bear Bryant.
- (referring to Houston Oilers quarterback Warren Moon) "That boy could throw a football through a car wash and not get it wet."
- (when asked about Oilers RB Earl Campbell's inability to finish a one-mile run in training camp) "When it's first and a mile, I won't give it to him."
- (when asked by Bob Costas why he took his wife on all of the Oilers' road trips) "Because she's too ugly to kiss goodbye."
- (on January 7, 1980, to the crowd at the Astrodome that welcomed the Oilers home after their second consecutive loss to the Steelers in the AFC championship game) "One year ago, we knocked on the door. This year, we beat on the door. Next year, we're going to kick the son of a bitch in."
- (of Earl Campbell) "I don't know if he's in a class by himself, but I do know that when that class gets together, it sure don't take long to call the roll."
- Late one night, Phillips and Sid Gillman were watching film and Phillips began to doze off. Gillman woke him up by saying, "Hey Bum, this is better than making love." Phillips responded, "Either I don't know how to watch film, Sid, or you don't know how to make love." (Phillips later indicated that his language may have actually been stronger than that.)
- (From a PRO! Gameday program interview, when asked what he would be doing if he wasn't an NFL coach) "Teach first grade. Little bitty kids. You say 'boo' to 'em and they jump. And you don't have to fine 'em."
- "Respect all. Fear none."
- "The only discipline that lasts is self-discipline."
- "Two kinds of players ain't worth a damn: One that never does what he's told, and one who does nothin' but what he's told."
- (Speaking to the Saints prior to a 1983 game) "Do everything as good as you can, and then a little bit more. That's all the hell you gotta do."

== Head coaching record ==
=== College ===
Year	Team	Overall	Conference	Standing	Bowl/playoffs
Texas Western Miners (NCAA University Division independent) (1962)
1962	Texas Western	4–5			
Texas Western:		4–5			
Total:		4–5			

=== NFL ===
Team	Year	Regular season					Postseason			
Team	Year	Won	Lost	Ties	Win %	Finish	Won	Lost	Win %	Result
HOU	1975	10	4	0	.714	3rd in AFC Central	–	–	–	–
HOU	1976	5	9	0	.357	4th in AFC Central	–	–	–	–
HOU	1977	8	6	0	.571	2nd in AFC Central	–	–	–	–
HOU	1978	10	6	0	.625	2nd in AFC Central	2	1	.667	Lost to Pittsburgh Steelers in AFC Championship Game
HOU	1979	11	5	0	.688	2nd in AFC Central	2	1	.667	Lost to Pittsburgh Steelers in AFC Championship Game
HOU	1980	11	5	0	.688	2nd in AFC Central	0	1	.000	Lost to Oakland Raiders in AFC Wild-Card Game
HOU Total		55	35	0	.611		4	3	.571	
NO	1981	4	12	0	.250	4th in NFC West	–	–	–	–
NO	1982	4	5	0	.444	9th in NFC	–	–	–	–
NO	1983	8	8	0	.500	3rd in NFC West	–	–	–	–
NO	1984	7	9	0	.438	3rd in NFC West	–	–	–	–
NO	1985	4	8	0	.333	Resigned	–	–	–	
NO Total		27	42	0	.391		0	0	.000	
Total		82	77	0	.516		4	3	.571	

== See also ==
- List of American Football League players
