= Craig Heyward =

American football player (1966–2006)

No. 34, 45, 33
- Position: Fullback

Personal information
- Born: September 26, 1966; Passaic, New Jersey, U.S.
- Died: May 27, 2006 (aged 39); Atlanta, Georgia, U.S.
- Listed height: 5 ft 11 in (1.80 m)
- Listed weight: 260 lb (118 kg)

Career information
- High school: Passaic
- College: Pittsburgh
- NFL draft: 1988: 1st round, 24th overall pick

Career history
- New Orleans Saints (1988–1992); Chicago Bears (1993); Atlanta Falcons (1994–1996); St. Louis Rams (1997); Indianapolis Colts (1998)

Awards and highlights
- Pro Bowl (1995); Consensus All-American (1987); First-team All-East (1987); Second-team All-East (1986)

Career NFL statistics
- Rushing attempts: 1,031
- Rushing yards: 4,301
- Rushing touchdowns: 30
- Receptions: 177
- Receiving yards: 1,559
- Receiving touchdowns: 4
- Stats at Pro Football Reference

Craig William Heyward (September 26, 1966 – May 27, 2006), nicknamed "Ironhead", was an American professional football player who was a fullback in the National Football League (NFL). He played college football for the Pittsburgh Panthers. He then played for the New Orleans Saints, Chicago Bears, Atlanta Falcons, St. Louis Rams, and Indianapolis Colts in an 11-year NFL career.

== Professional career ==
He was selected by the New Orleans Saints in the first round (24th pick overall) of the 1988 NFL draft out of the University of Pittsburgh. Heyward's 3,086 career rushing yards rank third all-time at Pitt in only three seasons. He declared himself eligible for the 1988 draft after his junior year. In 1987 at Pittsburgh, Heyward rushed for 1,791 yards to earn consensus All-American honors and finish fifth in the Heisman Trophy balloting.

Heyward was widely feared by opposing defenses because he was often as big, and sometimes bigger, than the defenders who had to stop him, and had agility. One of the NFL's "big man" running backs in the vein of Earl Campbell, Heyward, at 5' 11" and reportedly weighing 330 pounds, was a runner who was also a blocker and good receiver. Heyward slimmed down to closer to 280.

In 1997, Heyward showcased his sense of humor in a series of television commercials for Zest body wash, introducing a generation of American men to the modern version of the luffa that is now a fixture in many showers and bathtubs. The "lather-builder" and Heyward's tough-guy image created a humorous contrast in the advertisement, culminating in a voting campaign that named it the "thingy".

In November 1998, Heyward reported blurred vision in his right eye, and was diagnosed with a malignant bone cancer, reportedly a chordoma, at the base of his skull that was pressing on the optic nerve. After it was partially removed in a 12-hour operation, he underwent 40 rounds of radiation treatments and was later pronounced cancer-free; the diagnosis nonetheless ended his playing career.

Heyward's 1995 season is the last time a fullback rushed for 1,000 yards.

== NFL career statistics ==
Legend
| **Bold** | Career high |

| Year | Team | GP | Rushing | | | | | Receiving | | | | |
| Year | Team | GP | Att | Yds | Avg | Lng | TD | Rec | Yds | Avg | Lng | TD |
|---|---|---|---|---|---|---|---|---|---|---|---|---|
| 1988 | NO | 11 | 74 | 355 | **4.8** | **73** | 1 | 13 | 105 | 8.1 | 18 | 0 |
| 1989 | NO | 16 | 49 | 183 | 3.7 | 15 | 1 | 13 | 69 | 5.3 | 12 | 0 |
| 1990 | NO | 16 | 129 | 599 | 4.6 | 47 | 4 | 18 | 121 | 6.7 | 12 | 0 |
| 1991 | NO | 7 | 76 | 260 | 3.4 | 15 | 4 | 4 | 34 | 8.5 | 22 | 1 |
| 1992 | NO | 16 | 104 | 416 | 4.0 | 23 | 3 | 19 | 159 | 8.4 | 21 | 0 |
| 1993 | CHI | 16 | 68 | 206 | 3.0 | 11 | 0 | 16 | 132 | 8.3 | 20 | 0 |
| 1994 | ATL | 16 | 183 | 779 | 4.3 | 17 | **7** | 32 | 335 | **10.5** | **34** | 1 |
| 1995 | ATL | 16 | **236** | **1,083** | 4.6 | 31 | 6 | **37** | **350** | 9.5 | 25 | **2** |
| 1996 | ATL | 15 | 72 | 321 | 4.5 | 34 | 3 | 16 | 168 | **10.5** | 25 | 0 |
| 1997 | STL | 16 | 34 | 84 | 2.5 | 8 | 1 | 8 | 77 | 9.6 | 25 | 0 |
| 1998 | IND | 4 | 6 | 15 | 2.5 | 8 | 0 | 1 | 9 | 9.0 | 9 | 0 |
| Career | | 149 | 1,031 | 4,301 | 4.2 | 73 | 30 | 177 | 1,559 | 8.8 | 34 | 4 |

== Personal life ==
=== Nickname ===
In an article that son Cameron Heyward wrote for The Players' Tribune regarding his father, he was told that when Heyward was 12 or 13, he was at the Boys & Girls Club in Passaic, New Jersey when another boy approached him with a pool cue. The boy hit it over Heyward's head and Heyward barely flinched. It was actually Mr. Philip, who worked at the Boys Club who first said, “You have an Iron head!” After relating the story to his mother later, she called him "Ironhead," and the nickname stuck. Heyward carried the nickname through Passaic High School, where it also became a reference to his wild-man strength and the fact that he had to wear a hat size of 8¾. Heyward's obituary in The New York Times made an additional reference to the nickname's origin, which Cameron had disputed in his article that that was not how "Ironhead" came to be; that in street football games, he would lower his head into the stomach of the tackler. One opponent had said it hurt so much that Heyward's head "must be made of iron."

=== Family ===
Heyward had four sons named Craig Jr., Cameron, Corey, and Connor. All four played sports in high school. Craig Jr. played for his father's alma mater in New Jersey, while his three brothers played for Peachtree Ridge High School in Georgia.

Heyward's son, Cameron, plays defensive tackle for the Pittsburgh Steelers. He played for the Ohio State Buckeyes, where he was named a Freshman All-American in 2007 and honored as a team captain. He was selected by the Steelers in the first round (31st pick overall) of the 2011 NFL draft. He would write the words "IRON HEAD" on his eye black as a tribute to his father.

Heyward's oldest son, Craig Jr., played high school football for Passaic High School as he did and later was a walk-on at Middle Tennessee State, where he played primarily on special teams. He was signed to the Trenton Steel of the SIFL where he was a running back. After his playing career ended, Heyward Jr. entered coaching as an assistant for Nutley High School in his native northern New Jersey.

Heyward's son, Corey, graduated from Peachtree Ridge High School and played basketball for Georgia Tech.

His youngest son, Connor, elected to play college football at Michigan State University in 2017. He was selected by the Steelers, as Cameron was, in the sixth round (208th pick overall) of the 2022 NFL draft.

=== Cancer and death ===
Heyward died on May 27, 2006, at the age of 39, a year after another cancerous tumor developed that had metastasized to his brain; the recurrence of the tumor proved to be inoperable. Heyward had also experienced a stroke in the years prior to his death.

== See also ==
- List of college football yearly rushing leaders
