= Hoby Brenner =

American football player (born 1959)

No. 85
- Position: Tight end

Personal information
- Born: June 2, 1959 (age 67); Lynwood, California, U.S.
- Listed height: 6 ft 5 in (1.96 m)
- Listed weight: 244 lb (111 kg)

Career information
- High school: Fullerton Union (Fullerton, California)
- College: USC
- NFL draft: 1981: 3rd round, 71st overall pick

Career history
- New Orleans Saints (1981–1993)

Awards and highlights
- Pro Bowl (1987); New Orleans Saints Hall of Fame; National champion (1978); First-team All-Pac-10 (1979); Second-team All-Pac-10 (1980)

Career NFL statistics
- Receptions: 267
- Receiving yards: 3,849
- Receiving touchdowns: 21
- Stats at Pro Football Reference

Hoby F. J. Brenner (born June 2, 1959) is an American former professional football player who was a tight end for the New Orleans Saints of the National Football League (NFL). He played college football for the USC Trojans. A Pro Bowl selection in 1987, he was named to the New Orleans Saints Hall of Fame.

== Early life ==
Brenner prepped at Fullerton Union High School. His teammate at Fullerton Union High was future NFL player Keith Van Horne of the Chicago Bears.

== College career ==
Brenner played college football at the University of Southern California (USC), and was a selection on the 1980 All-Pacific-10 Conference football team.

== Professional career ==
Brenner played for the New Orleans Saints between 1981 and 1993. He was a Pro Bowl selection in 1987.

== NFL career statistics ==
Legend
**Bold**	Career high

=== Regular season ===
Year	Team	Games		Receiving				
Year	Team	GP	GS	Rec	Yds	Avg	Lng	TD
1981	NOR	9	1	7	143	**20.4**	34	0
1982	NOR	8	8	16	171	10.7	25	0
1983	NOR	**16**	**16**	41	574	14.0	38	3
1984	NOR	**16**	**16**	28	554	19.8	**57**	**6**
1985	NOR	**16**	**16**	**42**	**652**	15.5	30	3
1986	NOR	15	12	18	286	15.9	34	0
1987	NOR	12	10	20	280	14.0	29	2
1988	NOR	10	8	5	67	13.4	24	0
1989	NOR	**16**	**16**	34	398	11.7	30	4
1990	NOR	**16**	**16**	17	213	12.5	31	2
1991	NOR	**16**	**16**	16	179	11.2	21	0
1992	NOR	15	13	12	161	13.4	23	0
1993	NOR	10	9	11	171	15.5	27	1
		175	157	267	3,849	14.4	57	21

=== Playoffs ===
Year	Team	Games		Receiving				
Year	Team	GP	GS	Rec	Yds	Avg	Lng	TD
1987	NOR	**1**	**1**	**2**	**33**	16.5	**25**	0
1990	NOR	**1**	**1**	1	17	**17.0**	17	0
1991	NOR	**1**	**1**	0	0	0.0	0	0
1992	NOR	**1**	**1**	**2**	24	12.0	18	0
		4	4	5	74	14.8	25	0
