= Brett Perriman =

American football player (born 1965)

No. 80, 85
- Position: Wide receiver

Personal information
- Born: October 10, 1965 (age 61); Miami, Florida, U.S.
- Listed height: 5 ft 9 in (1.75 m)
- Listed weight: 180 lb (82 kg)

Career information
- High school: Miami Northwestern
- College: Miami (FL)
- NFL draft: 1988: 2nd round, 52nd overall pick

Career history
- New Orleans Saints (1988–1990); Detroit Lions (1991–1996); Kansas City Chiefs (1997); Miami Dolphins (1997)

Awards and highlights
- National champion (1987)

Career NFL statistics
- Receptions: 525
- Receiving yards: 6,589
- Receiving touchdowns: 30
- Stats at Pro Football Reference

Brett R. Perriman (born October 10, 1965) is an American former professional football player who was a wide receiver in the National Football League (NFL) for the New Orleans Saints (1988–1990), Detroit Lions (1991–1996), Kansas City Chiefs (1997), and Miami Dolphins (1997). He played college football at the University of Miami.

== College career ==
Perriman was a wide receiver at the University of Miami under coach Jimmy Johnson. Perriman finished his 4-year career there with 62 catches for 1,073 yards and 6 TD. He also had 550 punt return yards with 1 TD and a 22-yard kick return in 1985. His best season was 1986 when he finished with 34 catches, 647 yards receiving, and 4 TD. All second to teammate Michael Irvin on the year.

== Professional career ==
Pre-draft measurables
Height	Weight	Hand span	40-yard dash	10-yard split	20-yard split	Vertical jump	Bench press
5 ft 9 3/8 in (1.76 m)	175 lb (79 kg)	8 3/4 in (0.22 m)	4.36 s	1.55 s	2.54 s	36.0 in (0.91 m)	17 reps
All values from NFL Combine

Perriman was selected in the second round of the 1988 NFL draft by the New Orleans Saints with the 52nd overall pick. Perriman is perhaps best known for his time spent in Detroit, as part of a Lions' passing attack that complemented the team's featured running back, Hall of Famer Barry Sanders. In 1995, Perriman had a career-high 108 receptions for 1,488 yards (fourth highest single-season total in team history). His teammate that year, Herman Moore, had 123 receptions and 1,686 yards (both franchise records, and the 123 receptions were a league record that stood until 2002, when Marvin Harrison broke his record), and Moore/Perriman became the first duo in NFL history with more than 100 receptions in the same season. They were also the first duo to post 1,400 yards each in the same season. Brett Perriman was a key contributor on Detroit teams that made the playoffs in 1991, 1993, 1994, and 1995. The 1991 and 1993 teams won the NFC Central Division title. The 1991 team posted a franchise record 12 victories and appeared in the NFC Championship Game. Perriman currently ranks fourth on Detroit's all-time list with 428 receptions for 5,244 yards. He finished his career with 525 receptions, 6,589 yards, and 30 touchdowns. He also had 180 rushing yards. On November 6, 1994, Perriman became the first player to score 2 two-point conversions in one game, both coming in the 4th quarter.

Perriman was interviewed about his time at the University of Miami for the ESPN 30 for 30 documentary The U, which premiered December 12, 2009, on ESPN.

== NFL career statistics ==
Legend
	Led the league
**Bold**	Career high

=== Regular season ===
Year	Team	Games		Receiving				
Year	Team	GP	GS	Rec	Yds	Avg	Lng	TD
1988	NO	**16**	0	16	215	13.4	33	2
1989	NO	14	1	20	356	**17.8**	47	0
1990	NO	**16**	15	36	382	10.6	29	2
1991	DET	15	14	52	688	12.8	42	1
1992	DET	**16**	**16**	69	810	11.7	40	4
1993	DET	15	15	49	496	10.1	34	2
1994	DET	**16**	14	56	761	13.6	39	4
1995	DET	**16**	**16**	**108**	**1,488**	13.8	**91**	**9**
1996	DET	**16**	**16**	94	1,021	10.9	44	5
1997	KC	5	4	6	83	13.8	27	0
1997	MIA	8	5	19	309	16.3	26	1
Career		153	116	525	6,589	12.6	91	30

== Personal life ==
Perriman has a son, Breshad, who was the first round pick (26th overall) for the Baltimore Ravens in the 2015 NFL draft.
