= Tyrone Anthony =

American football player (born 1962)

No. 22
- Position: Running back

Personal information
- Born: March 3, 1962 (age 64); Winston-Salem, North Carolina, U.S.
- Listed height: 5 ft 11 in (1.80 m)
- Listed weight: 212 lb (96 kg)

Career information
- High school: West Forsyth (Clemmons, North Carolina)
- College: North Carolina
- NFL draft: 1984: 3rd round, 69th overall pick

Career history
- New Orleans Saints (1984–1985); Chicago Bears (1986)*
- * Offseason or practice squad member only

Career NFL statistics
- Rushing yards: 170
- Rushing average: 4.6
- Receptions: 40
- Receiving yards: 298
- Touchdowns: 1
- Stats at Pro Football Reference

Edward Tyrone Anthony (born March 3, 1962) is an American former professional football player who was a running back in the National Football League (NFL). He played high school football at West Forsyth High School in Clemmons, North Carolina and college football for the North Carolina Tar Heels.

Following his college career, he was selected in the third round of the 1984 NFL draft by the New Orleans Saints. He played two seasons in the NFL with the Saints, in 1984 and 1985. He was waived by the Saints before the 1986 season. He was claimed of waivers by the Chicago Bears in June 1986 but never signed with the club and retired shortly later due to back injuries.
