= DeMond Winston =

American football player (born 1968)

No. 92
- Position: Linebacker

Personal information
- Born: September 14, 1968 (age 58); Birmingham, Alabama, U.S.
- Listed height: 6 ft 2 in (1.88 m)
- Listed weight: 239 lb (108 kg)

Career information
- High school: Lansing Catholic (Lansing, Michigan)
- College: Vanderbilt
- NFL draft: 1990: 4th round, 98th overall pick

Career history
- New Orleans Saints (1990–1994)

Awards and highlights
- First-team All-SEC (1989)
- Stats at Pro Football Reference

DeMond Winston (born September 14, 1968) is an American former professional football player who was a linebacker for the New Orleans Saints of the National Football League (NFL). He played college football for the Vanderbilt Commodores and was selected by the Saints in the fourth round of the 1990 NFL draft.
