= Jeff Walker (American football) =

American football player (born 1963)

No. 72, 68, 78
- Positions: Tackle, guard

Personal information
- Born: January 22, 1963 (age 63); Jonesboro, Arkansas, U.S.
- Listed height: 6 ft 4 in (1.93 m)
- Listed weight: 289 lb (131 kg)

Career information
- High school: Olive Branch (MS)
- College: Memphis State
- NFL draft: 1986: 3rd round, 70th overall pick

Career history
- San Diego Chargers (1986); Los Angeles Rams (1987–1988); New Orleans Saints (1988–1989); Phoenix Cardinals (1990); San Diego Chargers (1992)*
- * Offseason or practice squad member only

Career NFL statistics
- Games played: 30
- Stats at Pro Football Reference

Jeffrey Lynn Walker (born January 22, 1963) is an American former professional football player who was a tackle and guard in the National Football League (NFL) for the San Diego Chargers in the 1986 season and New Orleans Saints in the 1988 and 1989 seasons. He was selected by the Chargers in the third round of the 1986 NFL draft. he was a First Team All-South independent in 1985

In October 2011, he pleaded guilty to wire fraud and tax evasion charges.
