= Joe Kohlbrand =

American football player (born 1963)

No. 55
- Position: Linebacker

Personal information
- Born: March 18, 1963 (age 63); Merritt Island, Florida, U.S.
- Listed height: 6 ft 4 in (1.93 m)
- Listed weight: 242 lb (110 kg)

Career information
- High school: Merritt Island
- College: Miami (FL)
- NFL draft: 1985: 8th round, 206th overall pick

Career history
- New Orleans Saints (1985–1989); New York Jets (1990)*
- * Offseason or practice squad member only

Career NFL statistics
- Sacks: 2
- Stats at Pro Football Reference

Joe Kohlbrand (born March 18, 1963) is an American former professional football player who was a linebacker in the National Football League (NFL). He played for the New Orleans Saints from 1985 to 1989. He was selected by the Saints in the eighth round of the 1985 NFL draft after playing college football for the Miami Hurricanes.
