= Kevin Haverdink =

American football player (born 1965)

No. 70, 74
- Position: Offensive tackle

Personal information
- Born: October 20, 1965 (age 61); Holland, Michigan, U.S.
- Listed height: 6 ft 5 in (1.96 m)
- Listed weight: 285 lb (129 kg)

Career information
- High school: Hamilton (Hamilton, Michigan)
- College: Western Michigan (1985–1988)
- NFL draft: 1989: 5th round, 133rd overall pick

Career history
- New Orleans Saints (1989–1992)

Awards and highlights
- PFWA All-Rookie Team (1989); Third-team All-American (1988); First-team All-MAC (1988)

Career NFL statistics
- Games played: 41
- Games started: 27
- Stats at Pro Football Reference

Kevin Dean Haverdink (born October 20, 1965) is an American former professional football player who was an offensive tackle for three seasons with the New Orleans Saints of the National Football League (NFL). He was selected by the Saints in the fifth round of the 1989 NFL draft after playing college football at Western Michigan University.

== Early life and college ==
Kevin Dean Haverdink was born on October 20, 1965, in Holland, Michigan. He attended Hamilton High School in Hamilton, Michigan.

Haverdink played college football for the Western Michigan Broncos of Western Michigan University from 1985 to 1988 and was a three-year letterman from 1986 to 1988. The Mid-American Conference's coaches named him a unanimous first-team All-MAC selection in 1988. He also earned Associated Press third-team All-American honors that season.

== Professional career ==
Haverdink was selected by the New Orleans Saints in the fifth round, with the 133rd overall pick, of the 1989 NFL draft. He officially signed with the team on July 27. He played in all 16 games, starting seven, for the Saints during his rookie year in 1989, earning PFWA All-Rookie Team honors. Haverdink appeared in 15 games, all starts, for the Saints in 1990 as the team finished with an 8–8 record. He also started one playoff game that year. He became a free agent after the 1990 season and re-signed with the team on July 23, 1991. Haverdink played in ten games, starting five, in 1991 before being placed on injured reserve on December 20, 1991. He was placed on injured reserve again the next year on August 25, 1992, and did not play in any games that year. He became a free agent after the 1992 season.
