= Richard Cooper (American football) =

American football player (born 1964)

No. 71, 77
- Position: Offensive tackle

Personal information
- Born: November 1, 1964 (age 62); Memphis, Tennessee, U.S.
- Listed height: 6 ft 5 in (1.96 m)
- Listed weight: 290 lb (132 kg)

Career information
- High school: Melrose (Memphis)
- College: Tennessee
- NFL draft: 1988: undrafted

Career history
- Seattle Seahawks (1988)*; New Orleans Saints (1989–1995); Philadelphia Eagles (1996–1998)
- * Offseason or practice squad member only

Career NFL statistics
- Games played: 108
- Games started: 103
- Fumble recoveries: 4
- Stats at Pro Football Reference

Richard Warren Cooper (born November 1, 1964) is an American former professional football player who was an offensive tackle for nine years with the New Orleans Saints and Philadelphia Eagles of the National Football League (NFL). He played college football for the Tennessee Volunteers. He played high school football at Melrose High School in Memphis, Tennessee.
