= Calvin Nicholson =

American football player (born 1967)

No. 38, 25, 4
- Position: Defensive back

Personal information
- Born: July 9, 1967 (age 59); Los Angeles, California, U.S.
- Listed height: 5 ft 9 in (1.75 m)
- Listed weight: 183 lb (83 kg)

Career information
- High school: El Camino Real (Los Angeles)
- College: Oregon State
- NFL draft: 1989: 11th round, 300th overall pick

Career history
- New Orleans Saints (1989–1991); → San Antonio Riders (1991); Ohio Glory (1992); Las Vegas Posse (1994)
- Stats at Pro Football Reference

Calvin Nicholson (born July 9, 1967) is an American former professional football defensive back. He played for the New Orleans Saints in 1989 and 1991, San Antonio Riders in 1991, Ohio Glory in 1992 and the Las Vegas Posse in 1994. He was selected by the Saints in the 11th round of the 1989 NFL draft with the 300th overall pick.
