= Tony Elliott (defensive lineman) =

American football player (1959–2007)

No. 99
- Position: Nose tackle

Personal information
- Born: April 23, 1959; New York, New York, U.S.
- Died: December 31, 2007 (aged 48); Bridgeport, Connecticut, U.S.
- Listed height: 6 ft 2 in (1.88 m)
- Listed weight: 282 lb (128 kg)

Career information
- High school: Warren Harding (Bridgeport, Connecticut)
- College: North Texas; Wisconsin
- NFL draft: 1982: 5th round, 114th overall pick

Career history
- New Orleans Saints (1982–1988)

Career NFL statistics
- Sacks: 13
- Fumble recoveries: 3
- Stats at Pro Football Reference

Anthony Robert Elliott (April 28, 1959 – December 31, 2007) was an American professional football defensive lineman who played seven seasons in the National Football League (NFL) for the New Orleans Saints. He attended North Texas and Wisconsin.
