= Lonzell Hill =

American gridiron football player (born 1965)

No. 87, 88, 8
- Position: Wide receiver

Personal information
- Born: September 25, 1965 (age 61); Stockton, California, U.S.
- Listed height: 5 ft 11 in (1.80 m)
- Listed weight: 189 lb (86 kg)

Career information
- High school: Stockton (CA) Stagg
- College: Washington
- NFL draft: 1987: 2nd round, 40th overall pick

Career history
- New Orleans Saints (1987–1990); Hamilton Tiger Cats (1992–1994)

Awards and highlights
- First-team All-Pac-10 (1986); Second-team All-Pac-10 (1985)

Career NFL statistics
- Receptions: 136
- Receiving yards: 1,696
- Touchdowns: 13
- Stats at Pro Football Reference

Lonzell Ramon Hill (born September 25, 1965) is an American former professional football player who was a wide receiver for four seasons in the National Football League (NFL) for the New Orleans Saints. He was selected by the Saints in the second round of the 1987 NFL draft with the 40th overall pick. His father, J. D. Hill, also played wide receiver in the NFL.

Pre-draft measurables
Height	Weight	Arm length	Hand span	40-yard dash	10-yard split	20-yard split	20-yard shuttle	Vertical jump
5 ft 10 5/8 in (1.79 m)	190 lb (86 kg)	30 3/4 in (0.78 m)	8 3/4 in (0.22 m)	4.57 s	1.58 s	2.66 s	4.11 s	31.0 in (0.79 m)
All values from NFL Combine

== Career ==
In 2007, Hill became the Salvation Army's social services director in Renton, Washington. Prior to his position in Renton, he was the youth director at the Seattle YMCA. Later on, Hill became a youth interim director at the YMCA in Cincinnati.

== See also ==
- Washington Huskies football statistical leaders
