= Bobby Morse =

American football player (born 1965)

No. 36, 35
- Positions: Running back, return specialist

Personal information
- Born: October 3, 1965 (age 61); Muskegon, Michigan, U.S.
- Listed height: 5 ft 10 in (1.78 m)
- Listed weight: 207 lb (94 kg)

Career information
- High school: Muskegon
- College: Michigan State
- NFL draft: 1987: 12th round, 316th overall pick

Career history
- Philadelphia Eagles (1987); New Orleans Saints (1989); San Francisco 49ers (1989); New Orleans Saints (1989–1991)

Career NFL statistics
- Rushing yards: 64
- Rushing average: 5.8
- Return yards: 1,027
- Total touchdowns: 1
- Stats at Pro Football Reference

Robert J. Morse (born October 3, 1965) is an American former professional football player who was a running back and return specialist in the National Football League (NFL) for the Philadelphia Eagles, San Francisco 49ers, and New Orleans Saints. He played college football for the Michigan State Spartans. Morse was selected by the Eagles in the 12th round of the 1987 NFL draft but was placed on reserve status in April 1988 and did not play football for the remainder of that year. He was traded to the Saints in 1989 and was on and off the roster several times during the year. He was signed by the San Francisco 49ers for five days in November 1989 but did not play in a regular season game before re-signing, and finishing his career, with the Saints.
