= Glenn Derby =

American football player (born 1964)

No. 79
- Positions: Tackle, guard, center

Personal information
- Born: June 27, 1964 (age 62); Oconomowoc, Wisconsin, U.S.
- Listed height: 6 ft 6 in (1.98 m)
- Listed weight: 290 lb (132 kg)

Career information
- High school: Oconomowoc
- College: Wisconsin
- NFL draft: 1988: 8th round, 218th overall pick

Career history
- New Orleans Saints (1988–1990); Green Bay Packers (1991)*
- * Offseason or practice squad member only

Career NFL statistics
- Games played: 7
- Stats at Pro Football Reference

Glenn Evans Derby Jr. (born June 27, 1964) is an American former professional football player who was an offensive lineman in the National Football League (NFL). He was selected by the Saints in the eighth round of the 1988 NFL draft. He played three seasons for the New Orleans Saints (1988–1990) as a tackle, guard and center. He went to Green Bay Packers as a free agent and left after injury in 1991. He played college football for the Wisconsin Badgers.

Derby is the brother of former NFL player John Derby. His nephew, A. J. Derby, a tight end, played for the New England Patriots and the Denver Broncos and is now with the Miami Dolphins.

== See also ==
- List of New Orleans Saints players
