= Milton Mack =

American football player (born 1963)

No. 24, 21
- Position: Cornerback

Personal information
- Born: September 20, 1963 (age 63); Jackson, Mississippi, U.S.
- Listed height: 5 ft 11 in (1.80 m)
- Listed weight: 188 lb (85 kg)

Career information
- High school: Callaway (Jackson)
- College: Alcorn State
- NFL draft: 1987: 5th round, 123rd overall pick

Career history
- New Orleans Saints (1987–1992); Tampa Bay Buccaneers (1992-1993); Detroit Lions (1994); New Orleans Saints (1996)*
- * Offseason or practice squad member only

Career NFL statistics
- Tackles: 204
- Interceptions: 12
- Touchdowns: 1
- Stats at Pro Football Reference

Milton Jerome Mack (born September 20, 1963) is an American former professional football player who was a cornerback in the National Football League (NFL) for the New Orleans Saints, Tampa Bay Buccaneers, and Detroit Lions. He was selected by the Saints in the fifth round of the 1987 NFL draft. He played college football for the Alcorn State Braves.
