= James Haynes (American football) =

American football player (1960–2020)

No. 92
- Position: Linebacker

Personal information
- Born: April 9, 1960; Tallulah, Louisiana, U.S.
- Died: November 14, 2020 (aged 60); Waxahachie, Texas, U.S.
- Listed height: 6 ft 2 in (1.88 m)
- Listed weight: 230 lb (104 kg)

Career information
- High school: Tallulah (Louisiana)
- College: Coahoma JC (1980–1981); Mississippi Valley State (1982–1983)
- NFL draft: 1984: undrafted

Career history
- New Orleans Saints (1984–1989)
- Stats at Pro Football Reference

James Haynes (August 9, 1960 – November 14, 2020) was an American professional football linebacker who played six seasons with the New Orleans Saints of the National Football League (NFL). He played college football at Coahoma Junior College and Mississippi Valley State University.

== Early life and college ==
James Haynes was born on August 9, 1960, in Tallulah, Louisiana. He attended Tallulah High School in Tallulah.

He first played college football at Coahoma Junior College from 1980 to 1981. He then transferred to Mississippi Valley State University, where he was a two-year letterman for the Mississippi Valley State Delta Devils from 1982 to 1983.

== Professional career ==
After going undrafted in the 1984 NFL draft, Haynes signed with the New Orleans Saints on July 20, 1984. He was released by the Saints on October 4 but re-signed on October 5. He then played in the final ten games of the 1984 season. Haynes appeared in all 16 games, starting five, in 1985, recording two sacks and two fumble recoveries. He started all 16 games for the Saints in 1986, totaling two sacks, two fumble recoveries, and one interception that he returned 17 yards for a touchdown. The Saints finished the year with a 7–9 record. Pat Swilling replaced him as starter in 1987. Haynes appeared in 12 regular season games and one playoff game during the 1987 season. Haynes was placed on injured reserve on August 27, 1988. He was later activated on November 26, 1988, and played in four games for the Saints during the 1988 season, recording one fumble recovery. He appeared in three games, starting two, in 1989 before being released on October 13, 1989.

== Personal life ==
Haynes died on November 14, 2020, in Waxahachie, Texas.
