= Greg Scales =

American football player (born 1966)

No. 83
- Position: Tight end

Personal information
- Born: May 9, 1966 (age 60); Winston-Salem, North Carolina, U.S.
- Listed height: 6 ft 4 in (1.93 m)
- Listed weight: 253 lb (115 kg)

Career information
- High school: East Forsyth (Kernersville, North Carolina)
- College: Wake Forest
- NFL draft: 1988: 5th round, 112th overall pick

Career history
- New Orleans Saints (1988–1991)

Career NFL statistics
- Receptions: 21
- Receiving yards: 196
- Touchdowns: 2
- Stats at Pro Football Reference

Greg Scales (born May 9, 1966) is an American former professional football player, who played tight end for four seasons with the New Orleans Saints. He was selected by the Saints in the fifth round of the 1988 NFL draft.
