= Brad Edelman =

American football player (born 1960)

No. 63
- Position: Guard

Personal information
- Born: September 3, 1960 (age 66); Jacksonville, Florida, U.S.
- Listed height: 6 ft 6 in (1.98 m)
- Listed weight: 265 lb (120 kg)

Career information
- High school: Parkway North (St. Louis County, Missouri)
- College: Missouri
- NFL draft: 1982: 2nd round, 30th overall pick

Career history
- New Orleans Saints (1982–1989)

Awards and highlights
- Pro Bowl (1987); PFWA All-Rookie Team (1982); First-team All-Big Eight (1980); Second-team All-Big Eight (1981)

Career NFL statistics
- Games played: 90
- Games started: 87
- Fumble recoveries: 1
- Stats at Pro Football Reference

Brad M. Edelman (born September 3, 1960) is an American former professional football player who was a guard for the New Orleans Saints of the National Football League (NFL). Edelman played college football for the Missouri Tigers.

== Biography ==
Edelman was born in Jacksonville, Florida, and is Jewish. Edelman played college football at the University of Missouri. He played 90 games of American football at guard in the National Football League for the New Orleans Saints from 1982 to 1989.

His current occupation is photographer, and he currently resides in New Orleans' French Quarter. He also does sports analysis for WDSU-TV in New Orleans.

He was inducted into the St. Louis Jewish Sports Hall of Fame.

== See also ==
- List of select Jewish football players
