= Brett Maxie =

American football player and coach (born 1962)

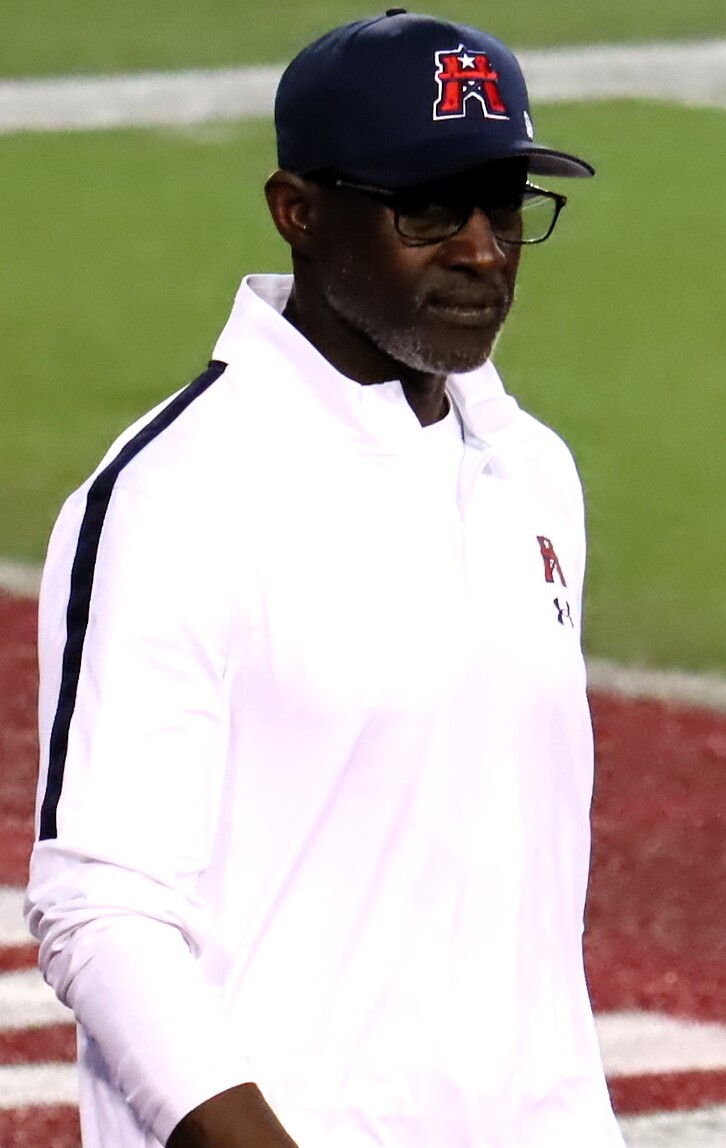
- Maxie in 2025

Personal information
- Born: January 13, 1962 (age 64); Dallas, Texas, U.S.
- Listed height: 6 ft 2 in (1.88 m)
- Listed weight: 194 lb (88 kg)

Career information
- High school: Dallas (TX) Madison
- College: Texas Southern
- NFL draft: 1985: undrafted

Career history

Playing
- New Orleans Saints (1985–1993); Atlanta Falcons (1994); Carolina Panthers (1995–1996); San Francisco 49ers (1997)

Coaching
- Carolina Panthers (1998) Quality control coach & defensive backs coach; San Francisco 49ers (1999–2001) Assistant defensive secondary coach; San Francisco 49ers (2002–2003) Defensive backs coach; Atlanta Falcons (2004–2006) Defensive backs coach; Miami Dolphins (2007) Secondary coach; Dallas Cowboys (2008–2011) Defensive backs coach; Tennessee Titans (2012–2013) Defensive backs coach; Vanderbilt (2014) Secondary coach; Vanderbilt (2015) Cornerbacks coach; Tampa Bay Buccaneers (2016–2018) Defensive backs coach; IMG Academy (2019) Defensive coordinator; Colorado (2020–2022) Safeties coach; Houston Roughnecks (2023–2025) Defensive backs coach

Career NFL statistics
- Tackles: 588
- Interceptions: 23
- Fumble recoveries: 6
- Touchdowns: 3
- Stats at Pro Football Reference

Brett Derrell Maxie (born January 13, 1962) is an American football coach and former player who is a defensive backs coach of the National Football League (NFL). He was a safety for 13 seasons for the NFL's New Orleans Saints, Atlanta Falcons, Carolina Panthers, and San Francisco 49ers. He spent the 2007 NFL season as a defensive assistant with the Miami Dolphins. On February 11, 2008, Maxie was named the assistant defensive coach with the Dallas Cowboys under Dave Campo. Maxie played college football at Texas Southern University.
