= Jim Wilks =

American football player (born 1958)

No. 94
- Positions: Defensive end, nose tackle

Personal information
- Born: March 12, 1958 (age 68); Los Angeles, California, U.S.
- Listed height: 6 ft 5 in (1.96 m)
- Listed weight: 252 lb (114 kg)

Career information
- High school: Pasadena (Pasadena, California)
- College: San Diego State
- NFL draft: 1981: 12th round, 305th overall pick

Career history
- New Orleans Saints (1981–1993)

Awards and highlights
- New Orleans Saints Hall of Fame; New Orleans Saints 45th Anniversary Team

Career NFL statistics
- Sacks: 49
- Fumble recoveries: 7
- Stats at Pro Football Reference

Jimmy Ray Wilks (born March 12, 1958) is an American former professional football player who was a defensive end for 13 seasons with the New Orleans Saints of the National Football League (NFL). He played college football for the San Diego State Aztecs. He is a member of Pasadena Sports Hall of Fame and New Orleans Saints Hall of Fame, and was also named to the Saints' 45th Anniversary Team.
