= John Tice =

American football player and coach (born 1960)

No. 82
- Position: Tight end

Personal information
- Born: June 22, 1960 (age 66); Bayshore, New York, U.S.
- Listed height: 6 ft 5 in (1.96 m)
- Listed weight: 242 lb (110 kg)

Career information
- High school: Central Islip (Central Islip, New York)
- College: Maryland
- NFL draft: 1983: 3rd round, 65th overall pick

Career history

Playing
- New Orleans Saints (1983–1992)

Coaching
- Minnesota Vikings (1999) (Offensive assistant); Minnesota Vikings (2000–2005) (Tight ends coach); Army Black Knights (2007–2008) (Offensive line coach); New York Sentinels (2009) (Offensive line coach)

Career NFL statistics
- Receptions: 158
- Receiving yards: 1,603
- Touchdowns: 15
- Stats at Pro Football Reference

John Kevin Tice (born June 22, 1960, in Bayshore, New York) is an American football coach and former tight end who played ten seasons in the National Football League (NFL) for the New Orleans Saints. He is currently the offensive line coach/co-offensive coordinator at Pace University, a Division II school in the Northeast 10 Conference. He was inducted into the Suffolk Sports Hall of Fame on Long Island in the Football Category with the Class of 2013.

He is also the younger brother of Mike Tice, a former quarterback for Maryland and in the NFL, and former head coach of the Minnesota Vikings. He was an assistant coach for the Vikings during Mike's tenure.
