= Amoore =

Amoore is a surname. Notable people with the surname include:

- Edward Amoore (1877–1955), British sport shooter
- Frederick Amoore (1913–1996), Anglican bishop
- Geoff Amoore (born 1964), Australian rules footballer
- Georgia Amoore (born 2001), Australian basketball player
- John E. Amoore (1930–1998), British biochemist
- Judy Amoore (born 1940), Australian sprinter and middle-distance runner
- Lesa Amoore, American model and photographer
- Louise Amoore (born 1972), British geographer and academic
- Renee Amoore (1953–2020), American politician

== See also ==
- Amore (disambiguation)
- Armour (disambiguation)
