= Lesa =

Lesa may refer to:

== People ==
- Falema‘i Lesa, Samoan individual who famously appealed a New Zealand overstay
- Lesa Amoore, American model and photographer
- Lesa Cline-Ransome, American author
- Lesa Kennedy (born 1961), American executive
- Lesa Lewis (born 1967), American bodybuilder
- Lesa Mayes-Stringer (born 1968), Canadian bobsledder
- Lesa Ní Mhunghaile, Irish academic and scholar
- Lesa Roe, American aerospace engineer
- Lesa Semmler, Canadian politician

== Places ==
- Lesa, Piedmont, Italy
- LESA, ICAO code for Salamanca Airport, Spain

== Other ==
- LESA, proposed NASA Moon base under the Apollo Applications Program

== See also ==
- Lesa Lesa, 2003 Indian Tamil-language film
