= Sheldon Napastuk =

Canadian football player (born 1974)

No. 92
- Position: Defensive lineman

Personal information
- Born: August 5, 1974 (age 52); North Battleford, Saskatchewan, Canada
- Listed height: 6 ft 4 in (1.93 m)
- Listed weight: 270 lb (122 kg)

Career information
- High school: North Battleford
- College: Iowa State (1992–1996)
- CFL draft: 1996: 3rd round, 25th overall pick

Career history
- Edmonton Eskimos (1997)*; Hamilton Tiger-Cats (1998)*; Saskatchewan Roughriders (1999–2002); Calgary Stampeders (2003–2006)
- * Offseason or practice squad member only

Awards and highlights
- CFL West All-Star (2005)

Sheldon Napastuk (born August 5, 1974) is a Canadian former professional football defensive lineman who played in the Canadian Football League (CFL) with the Saskatchewan Roughriders and Calgary Stampeders. He played college football at Iowa State.

== Early life ==
Sheldon Napastuk was born on August 5, 1974, in North Battleford, Saskatchewan. He grew up on a farm in the Richard-Mayfair, Saskatchewan, area. Napastuk said his mailing address was Richard, his phone number was Speers, and Maryfield was where he went to school. He grew up a Saskatchewan Roughriders fan. By the time he reached junior high, Napastuk said he could name every player on the Roughriders roster. He played high school football at North Battleford Comprehensive High School.

== College career ==
Napastuk played college football for the Iowa State Cyclones of Iowa State University. He redshirted the 1992 season, and was a four-year letterman from 1993 to 1996. In 1994, his leg was cut open by a screw on a tackling dummy. Napastuk said "I looked down and there was a flap of skin open and you could see fat tissue." Napastuk suffered an 100% tear of his right pectorial muscle in 1995 but still managed to play in 10 of 11 games.

== Professional career ==
Napastuk was selected by the Edmonton Eskimos in the third round, with the 25th overall pick, of the 1996 CFL draft despite previously declaring that he still wanted to complete his college eligibility. After finishing his college career, he attended training camp with the Eskimos in 1997 but was released before the start of the regular season.

Napastuk signed with the CFL's Hamilton Tiger-Cats in 1998 and was briefly converted to offensive linemen before being released before the start of the season again.

Napastuk was signed by the Saskatchewan Roughriders of the CFL in August 1999, and converted back to defensive line. He had been working at a hot dog stand in Saskatoon prior to signing with the Roughriders. After the 2001 season, he had a tryout with the Jacksonville Jaguars of the National Football League but was not signed. Napastuk dressed in 56 games overall for the Roughriders from 1999 to 2002.

Napastuk became a free agent after the 2002 season, and signed with the Calgary Stampeders on February 25, 2003. He dressed in 70 games for Calgary from 2003 to 2006, and earned CFL West All-Star honors for the 2005 season. He retired from the CFL on May 23, 2007. Napastuk finished his CFL career with totals of 126 games dressed, 157 tackles on defence, 23 sacks, one forced fumble, five fumble recoveries, and eight pass breakups.
