= Brad Yamaoka =

Canadian football player (born 1973)

No. 34, 30
- Position: Fullback

Personal information
- Born: January 10, 1973 (age 53); Kamloops, British Columbia, Canada
- Listed height: 5 ft 11 in (1.80 m)
- Listed weight: 206 lb (93 kg)

Career information
- High school: South Kamloops
- University: UBC
- CFL draft: 1996: 3rd round, 24th overall pick

Career history
- BC Lions (1996–1998); Winnipeg Blue Bombers (1999–2003)

Brad Yamaoka (born January 30, 1973) is a Canadian former professional football fullback who played in the Canadian Football League (CFL) with the BC Lions and Winnipeg Blue Bombers. He played CIAU football for the UBC Thunderbirds and was selected by the Lions in the third round of the 1996 CFL draft.

== Early life ==
Brad Yamaoka was born on January 30, 1973, in Kamloops, British Columbia. He played high school football at South Kamloops Secondary School. He was the team MVP in 1990.

== College career ==
Yamaoka enrolled at the University of British Columbia to play CIAU football for the Thunderbirds. He played for the Thunderbirds from 1991 to 1995 and was a team captain four times. He was a Canada West All-Star in 1992. Yamaoka led the team in rushing thrice and set school records in career rushing attempts and single-season rushing attempts.

== Professional career ==
Yamaoka was selected by the BC Lions in the third round, with the 24th overall pick, of the 1996 CFL draft. He spent the entire 1996 season on the team's practice roster. He dressed in 31 regular season games for the Lions from 1997 to 1998 before being released on October 17, 1998.

Yamaoka signed with the Winnipeg Blue Bombers on May 14, 1999. He dressed in 73 games for Winnipeg from 1999 to 2003. He was released on June 12, 2004, before the start of the regular season. Yamaoka finished his CFL career with totals of 104 games dressed, 10 carries for 66 yards, 12 receptions for 72 yards, 63 special teams tackles, two defensive tackles, two forced fumbles, and one blocked kick. He was the last CFL player from Kamloops until Jacob Bond in 2025.

== Personal life ==
Yamaoka was a coach for the Kamloops Broncos of the Canadian Junior Football League until leaving in 2018. As of 2019, he was an interior sales representative for Big Kahuna Sports. He was inducted into the B.C. Football Hall of Fame in 2019 and the Kamloops Sports Hall of Fame in 2020.
