= Jacob Bond =

Canadian football player (born 2003)

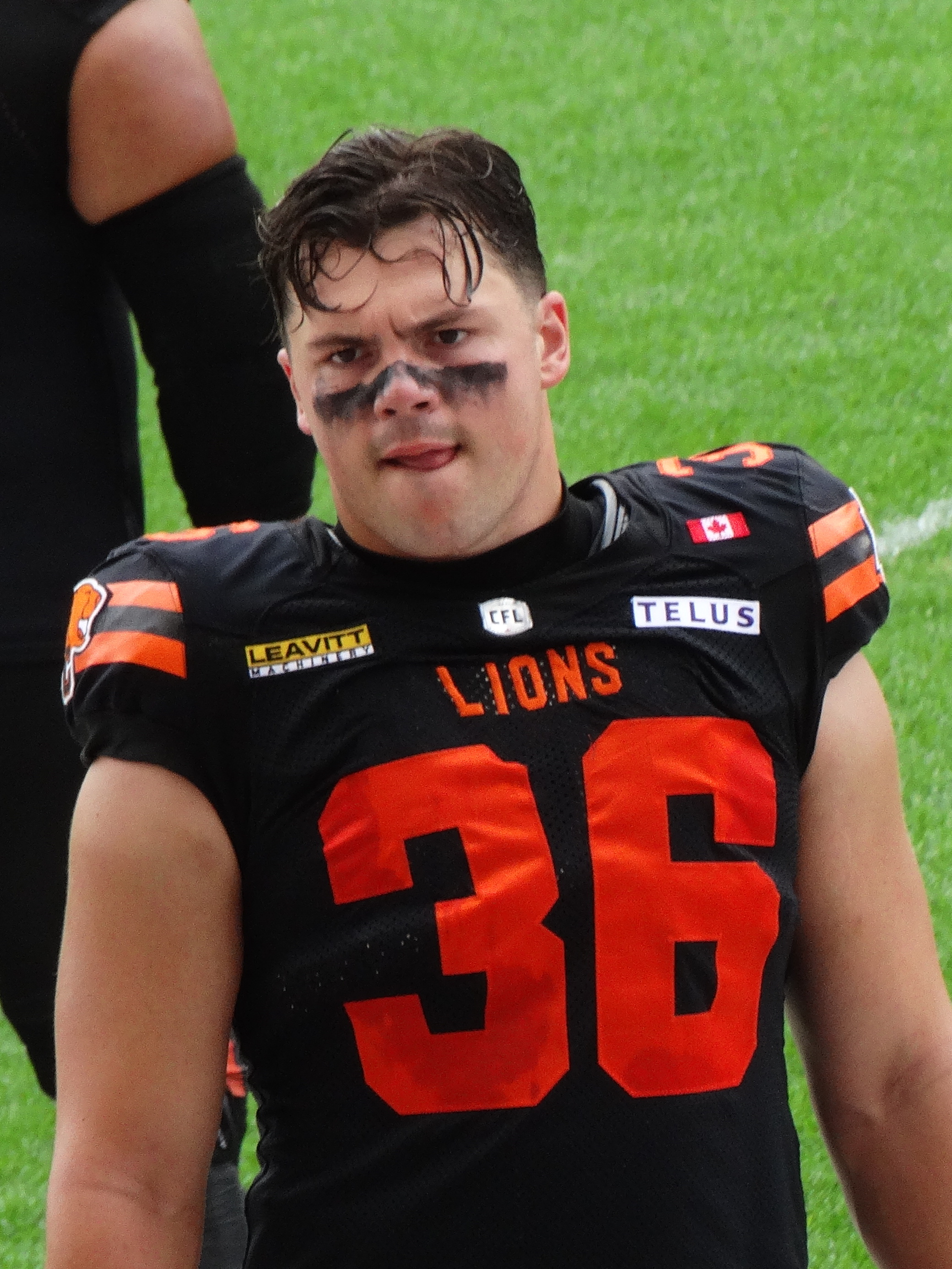
- Bond with the BC Lions in 2025

No. 36 – BC Lions
- Position: Fullback
- Roster status: Active
- CFL status: National

Personal information
- Born: March 18, 2003 (age 23); Terrace, British Columbia, Canada
- Listed height: 6 ft 3 in (1.91 m)
- Listed weight: 235 lb (107 kg)

Career information
- High school: South Kamloops (Kamloops, British Columbia)
- CJFL: Okanagan Sun (2021–2024)
- University: None

Career history
- BC Lions (2025–present)

Awards and highlights
- CJFL national champion (2022); BCFC Defensive Player of the Year (2024)
- Stats at CFL.ca

Jacob Bond (born March 18, 2003) is a Canadian professional football player for the BC Lions of the Canadian Football League (CFL). He previously played for the Okanagan Sun of the Canadian Junior Football League (CJFL).

== Early life ==
Jacob Bond was born on March 18, 2003, in Terrace, British Columbia. His family moved to Savona, British Columbia, when Bond was 11. Before Grade 11, he transferred from Ashcroft Secondary School in Ashcroft, British Columbia, to South Kamloops Secondary School in Kamloops, British Columbia. Bond did not play football until Grade 12, playing defensive end and slot receiver.

After graduating high school, Bond played junior football for the Okanagan Sun of the Canadian Junior Football League (CJFL) from 2021 to 2024. He first played receiver for the Sun, helping them win the national championship in 2022. He later moved to linebacker and played in nine games during the 2024 season, recording 43 defensive tackles (33 solo), six special teams tackles, one sack, one forced fumble, two fumble recoveries, and one rush for a two-yard touchdown. The Sun went 10–0 but lost in the national title game. Bond was named the B.C. Football Conference Defensive Player of the Year for his performance during the 2024 season.

== Professional career ==
Bond signed with the BC Lions of the Canadian Football League (CFL) on May 5, 2025, as a territorial exemption. He played in one preseason game on special teams on May 18 but suffered an ankle injury. He also spent some time at fullback in training camp, before being released on May 29, 2025. Bond was re-signed by the Lions on July 12, 2025, as a fullback. He made his CFL debut the next day against the Edmonton Elks, becoming the first player from Kamloops to play in the CFL since Brad Yamaoka in 2003. Bond was named the CFL Special Teams Player of the Week for Week 8 of the 2025 season after earning the highest Pro Football Focus (PFF) rating for special teams players with a 89.5 PFF grade. He has been used on special teams and in short-yardage situations on offence while with the Lions. On August 15, 2025, Bond was placed on the Lions' 1-game injured list. He rejoined the active roster on August 22, 2025. On August 12, 2026, Bond was placed on the Lions' 1-game injured list. On September 2, 2026, Bond was suspended by the CFL for two games after he tested positive for a banned substance, D-amfetamine, which is a violation of the league's joint drug policy with the CFL Players’ Association. He was reinstated to the active roster on September 24, 2026, after his suspension was lifted and his injury had healed.
