= Ryan King (Canadian football) =

Canadian football player (born 1986)

No. 53
- Position: Long snapper

Personal information
- Born: February 19, 1986 (age 40); Edmonton, Alberta, Canada
- Listed height: 5 ft 11 in (1.80 m)
- Listed weight: 220 lb (100 kg)

Career information
- High school: Bev Facey
- CJFL: Edmonton Wildcats
- University: Saint Mary's

Career history
- 2012–2020: Edmonton Eskimos

Awards and highlights
- Grey Cup champion (2015); Tom Pate Memorial Award (2018)
- Stats at CFL.ca

Ryan King (born February 19, 1986) is a Canadian former professional football long snapper who played for eight seasons with the Edmonton Eskimos of the Canadian Football League (CFL).

== Early career ==
King played high school football for the Bev Facey Falcons from 2001 to 2003. During this time, he won a Tier I provincial title with the Falcons. From 2004 to 2007, King played for the Edmonton Wildcats of the Canadian Junior Football League (CJFL) as a linebacker, where he earned 169 tackles and was named CJFL Linebacker of the Year and Defensive Player of the Year.

== College career ==
From 2008 to 2010, King played college football for the Saint Mary's Huskies as a linebacker. He was named an Atlantic University Sport (AUS) football all-star in 2009 and held a team captain position for 2009 and 2010. During 2010, he set a school record for most tackles with 114. Due to a new eligibility rule put in place by the CIS which prevented a player from spending more than seven years as a junior or college football player, King was unable to play college football during his final year at Saint Mary's and did not play during 2011.

== Professional career ==
When Taylor Inglis retired from the Edmonton Eskimos, he requested King to be tried out as his potential replacement at the long snapper position. King and Inglis had previously been teammates on the Edmonton Wildcats of the CJFL. King was selected by the Eskimos in the fifth round of the 2012 CFL draft with the 38th overall pick. After competing with several other players for the position in training camp, King was designated as the starting long snapper for the 2012 season. In his rookie season, King completed seven special teams tackles and recovered one fumble in 15 games. On October 13, in the Eskimos' Week 16 game against the Saskatchewan Roughriders, King suffered a separated shoulder and was placed on the nine-game injured list to end his rookie season. In 2013, he returned to his starting position and recorded eight special teams tackles and recovered a forced fumble while starting all 18 regular season games.

On April 17, 2014, the Eskimos signed King to a contract extension through the end of the 2015 season. He completed nine special teams tackles and a forced fumble recovery in 2014. He also played in two post-season games. King announced his retirement from football on April 13, 2021.

== Coaching ==
In 2014, King returned to coach the Edmonton Wildcats, where he played amateur football. He coached on the defense, primarily working with the team's linebackers.

== Awards and honors ==
King was the 2018 recipient of the Tom Pate Memorial Award.
