= Cory Stevens =

Canadian football player

No. 11
- Position: Punter

Personal information
- Born: ca. 1968
- Listed height: 6 ft 3 in (1.91 m)
- Listed weight: 245 lb (111 kg)

Career information
- High school: Bev Facey Community High School
- College: Minot State University
- CFL draft: 1996: 3rd round, 26th overall pick

Career history
- 1999: Saskatchewan Roughriders

Cory Stevens is a retired professional punter for the Saskatchewan Roughriders of the Canadian Football League (CFL). As of 2016 he was an assistant coach (defensive line) for Bev Facey Community High School in Sherwood Park, Alberta, where he attended high school in the 1980s. He owns a glass and door contracting company.

== College career ==
Stevens played for the Minot State Beavers as a punter and kicker from 1992 to 1995, while obtaining his Bachelor of Education. The team competed in the Division II North Dakota College Athletic Conference of the National Association of Intercollegiate Athletics (NAIA), and was conference football champion in 1992, 1993, and 1994. The 1992 team reached the semifinals of the NAIA Division II national championship and was inducted into the Minot State University Athletics Hall of Fame in 2016. Minot is now in the NCAA Division II Northern Sun Intercollegiate Conference.

Stevens was named to the All-Conference first team in 1993, 1994, and 1995; received honourable mention as an NAIA All-American scholar in 1994; and was named to the NAIA All-American scholar first team in 1995. He was the 1995 NAIA Division II punting champion with 52 punts for 2,278 yards, an average of 43.8 yards per punt.

Stevens holds the Beavers' team record for career points after touchdown kicks at 94 and punted for 8,832 yards on 220 punt attempts (second highest in team history in both categories). He also kicked six field goals on ten attempts.

== Professional career ==
Stevens was drafted 26th overall, in the third round of the 1996 CFL draft, by the Calgary Stampeders and was signed to a three-year contract. He was claimed off of waivers from the Edmonton Eskimos by the Saskatchewan Roughriders in July 1999, and played two games as a punter for the Roughriders in the 1999 season.

During those two games he punted 17 times for 681 yards. His longest punt was 63 yards and his average was 40.1 yards per punt. He scored one point on a rouge and made two tackles.
