= David Beard (Canadian football) =

Canadian gridiron football player (born 1993)

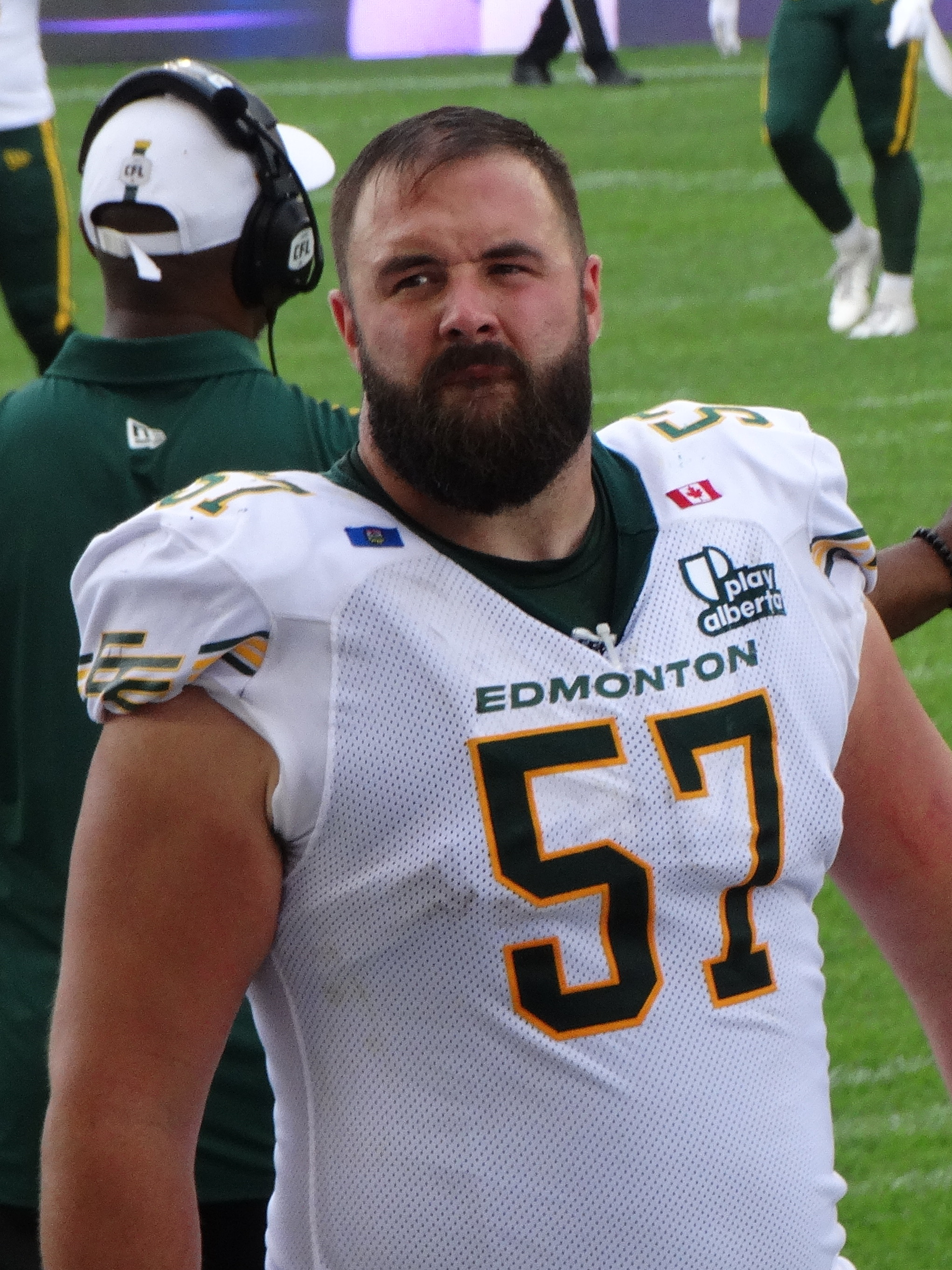
- Beard with the Edmonton Elks in 2025

No. 57 – Edmonton Elks
- Position: Offensive lineman
- Roster status: 1-game injured list
- CFL status: National

Personal information
- Born: February 23, 1993 (age 33); Sherwood Park, Alberta, Canada
- Listed height: 6 ft 5 in (1.96 m)
- Listed weight: 320 lb (145 kg)

Career information
- High school: Bev Facey
- University: Alberta
- CFL draft: 2015: 2nd round, 16th overall pick

Career history
- Edmonton Eskimos / Elks (2015–2022); Hamilton Tiger-Cats (2022–2024); Edmonton Elks (2025–present)

Awards and highlights
- 2× Grey Cup champion (2015, 2026); CFL All-Star (2024); CFL East All-Star (2024)
- Stats at CFL.ca

David Beard (born February 23, 1993) is a Canadian professional football offensive lineman for the Edmonton Elks of the Canadian Football League (CFL). He previously attended the University of Alberta where he played CIS football as an offensive and defensive lineman and studied kinesiology.

== Early life ==
Beard played high school football for the Falcons at Bev Facey Community High School for three years. He saw playing time at various positions, including wide receiver, tight end, and the offensive and defensive lines. Beard also played basketball at Bev Facey.

== University career ==
From 2011 to 2014, Beard played CIS football for the Alberta Golden Bears. For his first two seasons, he played at the defensive lineman position before being moved to the offensive line by Golden Bears head coach and former Eskimos offensive lineman Chris Morris. In his senior year, Beard was named a second-team All-Canadian and played in the CIS East-West Bowl. He also caught two passes for 31 yards and a touchdown.

== Professional career ==
=== Edmonton Eskimos / Elks ===
Beard was selected in the second round of the 2015 CFL draft by the Edmonton Eskimos with the 16th overall pick. In his CIS career, Beard had only played 16 games as an offensive lineman, and he expected to return to the Golden Bears for a third year at the position. Despite his limited experience, he remained on the active roster after the preseason. Beard made his CFL debut in the season opener on June 27, 2015, against the Toronto Argonauts. He played in the first five games of his rookie season at left guard.

In 2019, he was the unanimous selection for the Edmonton Eskimos' Most Outstanding Offensive Lineman. He re-signed with Edmonton on a contract extension through 2023 on December 26, 2020. He played in 94 games for Edmonton over seven seasons.

=== Hamilton Tiger-Cats ===
On September 2, 2022, Beard was traded to the Hamilton Tiger-Cats for Jesse Gibbon and an exchange of 2023 CFL draft picks.

=== Edmonton Elks (second stint) ===
The Elks announced Beard had signed with them through free agency on February 12, 2025.
