= Justin Ring =

Canadian football player (born 1973)

No. 36
- Position: Linebacker

Personal information
- Born: July 4, 1973 (age 53); Kamloops, British Columbia, Canada
- Listed height: 6 ft 2 in (1.88 m)
- Listed weight: 220 lb (100 kg)

Career information
- University: Simon Fraser
- CFL draft: 1996: 1st round, 5th overall pick

Career history
- 1996–1998: Hamilton Tiger-Cats
- 1999–2002: Edmonton Eskimos

Awards and highlights
- Tiger-Cats MOR (1996)

Justin Ring (born July 4, 1973) is a Canadian former professional football linebacker who played seven seasons in the Canadian Football League (CFL) with the Hamilton Tiger-Cats and Edmonton Eskimos. He was selected by the Hamilton Tiger-Cats in the first round of the 1996 CFL draft after playing college football at Simon Fraser University.

== Early life ==
Justin Ring was born on July 4, 1973, in Kamloops, British Columbia. He played collegiate American football for the Simon Fraser Clan of Simon Fraser University.

== Professional career ==
Ring was selected by the Hamilton Tiger-Cats of the Canadian Football League (CFL) in the first round, with the fifth overall pick, of the 1996 CFL draft. He was the Tiger-Cats' Most Outstanding Rookie in 1996. He dressed in all 54 games, starting 39, for the Tiger-Cats from 1996 to 1998.

Ring signed with the Edmonton Eskimos of the CFL on March 5, 1999. He dressed in all 18 games for Edmonton during the 1999, 2000, and 2002 seasons. He only dressed in one game in 2001 due to a torn ACL. Ring mostly played special teams during his stint with the Eskimos. He was released on April 4, 2003.

Ring finished his CFL career with totals of 174 defensive tackles, 80 special teams tackles, four sacks, three forced fumbles, three fumble recoveries, four interceptions, seven pass breakups, and one reception for eight yards in 109 games dressed.
