= Farell Duclair =

Haitian gridiron football player (born 1972)

Profile
- Position: Fullback

Personal information
- Born: May 10, 1972 (age 54); Port-au-Prince, Haiti
- Listed height: 6 ft 1 in (1.85 m)
- Listed weight: 225 lb (102 kg)

Career information
- University: Concordia
- CFL draft: 1996: 1st round, 8th overall pick

Career history
- 1996–1998: Calgary Stampeders
- 1999: Winnipeg Blue Bombers
- 2001: Toronto Argonauts

Awards and highlights
- Grey Cup champion (1998)

Farell Duclair (born May 10, 1972) is a former Canadian football fullback who played four seasons in the Canadian Football League (CFL) with the Calgary Stampeders and Winnipeg Blue Bombers. He was drafted by the Stampeders with the eighth overall pick in the 1996 CFL draft. He first enrolled at Vanier College before transferring to Northern Illinois University and lastly Concordia University. Duclair was also a member of the Toronto Argonauts.

== College career ==
Duclair played for the Vanier Cheetahs of Vanier College from 1990 to 1991. The Cheetahs won the 1991 Quebec Cegep Provincial championship. He transferred to play for the Northern Illinois Huskies of Northern Illinois University in 1992. He finished his college career with the Concordia Stingers of Concordia University.

== Professional career ==
Duclair was selected by the Calgary Stampeders with the eighth overall pick in the 1996 CFL draft. He played in 46 games for the Stampeders from 1996 to 1998. The Stampeders won the 86th Grey Cup against the Hamilton Tiger-Cats on November 22, 1998. He played in three games for the Winnipeg Blue Bombers during the 1999 season. Duclair was a member of the Toronto Argonauts in 2001. He retired, partly due to a pulled hamstring, the same year.

== Personal life ==
Duclair's nephew Anthony Duclair is a Canadian ice hockey player. Farell opened a private school called the Everest Academy, which has a strong focus on sports, in Thornhill, Ontario in 2010. Anthony Duclair attended Everest Academy. Farell had previously opened up another private athletic school, The Hill Academy in Orangeville, Ontario in 2006, but left the school after a few years.
