= List of Seattle Seahawks head coaches =

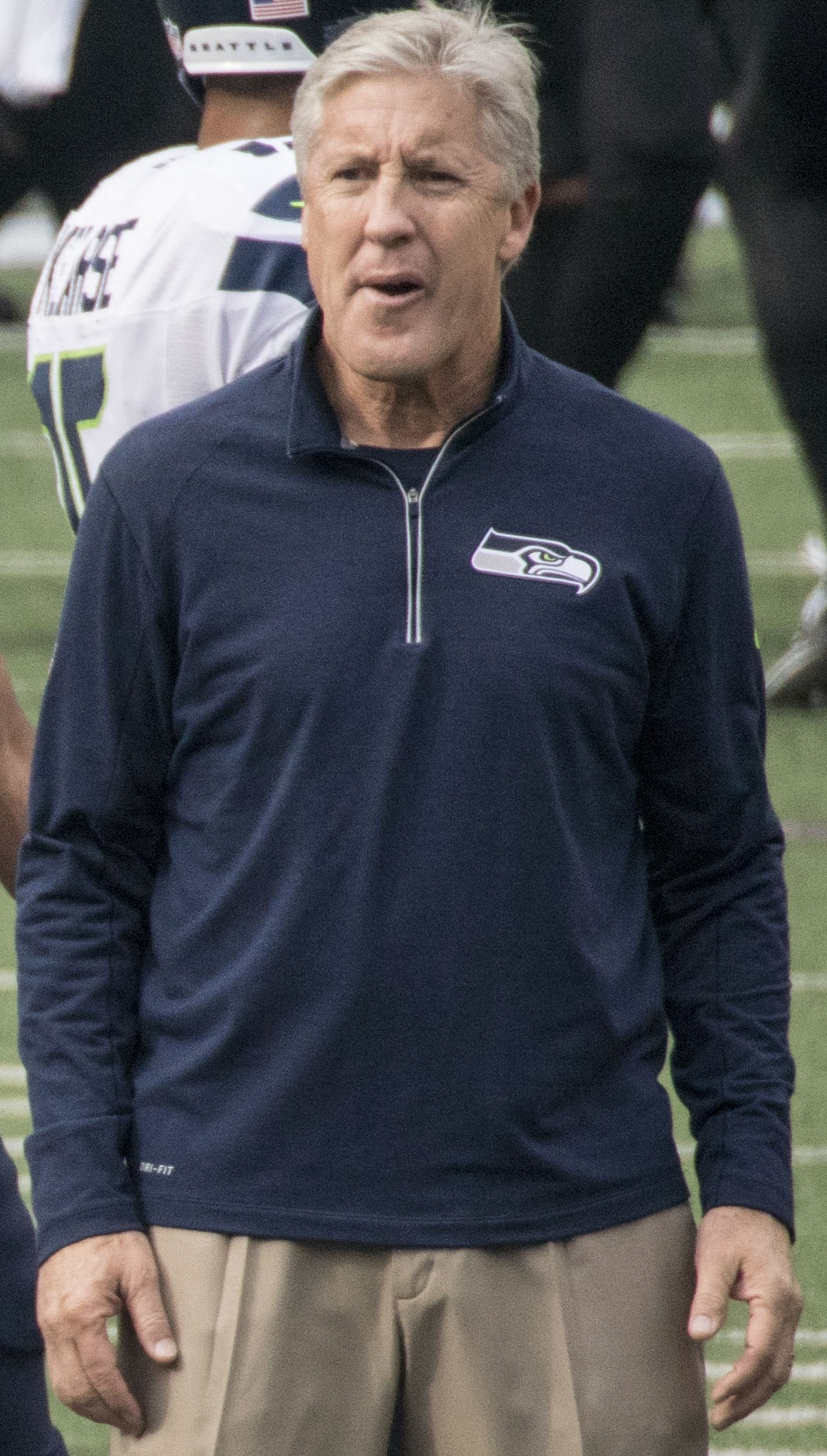
Pete Carroll was the Seahawks' coach from 2010 to 2023.

The Seattle Seahawks are a professional American football team based in Seattle, Washington. They are members of the Western Division of the National Football Conference (NFC) in the National Football League (NFL). The team, along with the Tampa Bay Buccaneers, joined the NFL in 1976 as expansion teams. The Seahawks are the only team to have played in both the American Football Conference (AFC) and NFC Championship Games. The team has made four Super Bowl appearances; they lost to the Pittsburgh Steelers in Super Bowl XL, before winning Super Bowl XLVIII against the Denver Broncos. The Seahawks then lost Super Bowl XLIX to the New England Patriots, before facing the New England Patriots again in Super Bowl LX and winning.

There have been nine coaches for the Seahawks franchise. Pete Carroll, who coached the team from 2010 to 2023, holds the team record for most regular season wins (137). Tom Flores, who coached the team from 1991 to 1994, was the team's least successful coach with a winning percentage of .292. Mike McCormack and Tom Flores are the only Seahawks coaches to have been inducted into the Pro Football Hall of Fame. The current head coach of the Seahawks is Mike Macdonald.

== Key ==
#	Number of coaches (Note: A running total of the number of coaches of the Seahawks. Thus, any coach who has two or more terms as head coach is only counted once.)
Yrs	Years coached
First	First season coached
Last	Last season coached
GC	Games Coached
W	Wins
L	Loses
T	Ties
Win%	Win – Loss percentage
†	Elected into the Pro Football Hall of Fame as a coach
*	Spent entire NFL head coaching career with the Seahawks

== Coaches ==
Note: Statistics are accurate through the end of the 2025 NFL regular season.

#	Image	Name	Term (Note: Each year is linked to an article about that particular NFL season.)			Regular season					Playoffs			Accomplishments	Ref.
#	Image	Name	Yrs	First	Last	GC	W	L	T	Win%	GC	W	L	Accomplishments	Ref.
1		Jack Patera*	7	1976	1982 (Note: After losing their first two games, and three weeks into the strike in 1982 season, Patera was fired as head coach. General manager McCormack took the role.)	94	35	59	0	.372	—			1 The Sporting News Coach of the Year Award (1978); 1 AP Coach of the Year Award (1978)	
2		Mike McCormack	1	1982		7	4	3	0	.571	—				
3		Chuck Knox	9	1983	1991	143	80	63	0	.559	7	3	4	1 AFC West Championship (1988); 4 Playoff Berths; 2 UPI Coach of the Year Awards (1983, 1984); 1 The Sporting News Coach of the Year Award (1984); 1 AP Coach of the Year Award (1984)	
4		Tom Flores†	3	1992	1994	48	14	34	0	.292	—				
5		Dennis Erickson	4	1995	1998	64	31	33	0	.484	—				
6		Mike Holmgren	10	1999	2008	160	86	74	0	.538	10	4	6	1 NFC Championship (2005); 1 AFC West Championship (1999); 4 NFC West Championships (2004, 2005, 2006, 2007); 6 Playoff Berths	
7		Jim L. Mora	1	2009		16	5	11	0	.313	—				
8		Pete Carroll	14	2010	2023	227	137	89	1	.606	19	10	9	1 Super Bowl Championship (XLVIII); 2 NFC Championships (2013, 2014); 5 NFC West Championships (2010, 2013, 2014, 2016, 2020); 10 Playoff Berths	
9		Mike Macdonald*	2	2024–present		34	24	10	0	.706	3	3	0	1 Super Bowl Championship (LX); 1 NFC Championship (2025); 1 NFC West Championship (2025); 1 Playoff Berth	
