= Rueben Mayes =

Canadian football player (born 1963)

No. 36
- Position: Running back

Personal information
- Born: June 6, 1963 (age 63); North Battleford, Saskatchewan, Canada
- Listed height: 5 ft 11 in (1.80 m)
- Listed weight: 201 lb (91 kg)

Career information
- High school: North Battleford
- College: Washington State
- NFL draft: 1986: 3rd round, 57th overall pick
- CFL draft: 1986: 1st round, 2nd overall pick

Career history
- New Orleans Saints (1986–1990); Seattle Seahawks (1992–1993)

Awards and highlights
- NFL Offensive Rookie of the Year (1986); 2× Pro Bowl (1986, 1987); PFWA All-Rookie Team (1986); New Orleans Saints Hall of Fame; Pop Warner Trophy (1985); 2× Pac-10 Player of the Year (1984, 1985); Consensus All-American (1984); 2× First-team All-Pac-10 (1984, 1985)

Career NFL statistics
- Rushing yards: 3,484
- Rushing average: 4
- Rushing touchdowns: 23
- Stats at Pro Football Reference
- College Football Hall of Fame

Rueben A. Mayes (born June 6, 1963) is a Canadian former professional football player who was a running back in the National Football League (NFL) from 1986 to 1993. He played college football for the Washington State Cougars, earning consensus All-American honors. He is a member of the College Football Hall of Fame.

== Early life ==
Mayes is a direct descendant of a group of African Americans who fled racial persecution in Oklahoma in 1910 and traveled north to Saskatchewan, Canada, after reading flyers which promised 160 acres (0.65 km^{2}) of free land to anyone willing to move there. This group of pioneers were known as the "Shiloh People", named after the "Shiloh Baptist Church", a small log cabin church they built after they arrived.

He first gained acclaim as a running back at North Battleford Comprehensive High School in North Battleford, Saskatchewan. In 1980, Mayes led the NBCHS Vikings to an undefeated season and the SHSAA 3A provincial football championship. In 1981, he set a provincial record in the 100 metres at the SHSAA provincial track and field championship that still stands. His sister is Lesa Mayes-Stringer, a former bobsled athlete who competed for Canada from 1999 to 2007.

== College career ==
Mayes played college football at Washington State University in Pullman, where he was recognized as a consensus All-American and finished tenth in the Heisman Trophy voting in 1984. Mayes set single-season and career-rushing school records (1,632; 3,519 yards) with the Cougars, and established an NCAA record for most rushing yards in one game (357 at Oregon in 1984). It was the Pacific-10 Conference record for over a quarter century, until broken by Ka'Deem Carey in 2012.

In 1995, a panel of experts commissioned by The Spokesman-Review named Mayes to the all-time WSU team. The honor was repeated in 1998 by Cougfan.com when it picked its list of the school's all-time greatest players. On May 1, 2008, he was elected to the College Football Hall of Fame. In August 2017, a group of panelists commissioned by the Pac-12 Network picked the 12 greatest Washington State players of all time and Mayes ranked No. 1.

== Professional career ==
Mayes was selected in the third round (57th overall) of the 1986 NFL draft by the New Orleans Saints. He was also selection second overall in the 1986 CFL draft by the Saskatchewan Roughriders, but never played in the CFL. He won the NFL Offensive Rookie of the Year Award that year from the Associated Press, and although his NFL career was hampered by injuries, he was named to the Pro Bowl twice. After five seasons with the Saints, Mayes was traded to the Seattle Seahawks in April 1992, where he played the final two years of his career.

== NFL career statistics ==
| Year | Team | Games | | Rushing | | | | | Receiving | | | | |
| Year | Team | GP | GS | Att | Yds | Avg | Lng | TD | Rec | Yds | Avg | Lng | TD |
|---|---|---|---|---|---|---|---|---|---|---|---|---|---|
| 1986 | NO | 16 | 12 | 286 | 1,353 | 4.7 | 50 | 8 | 17 | 96 | 5.6 | 18 | 0 |
| 1987 | NO | 12 | 12 | 243 | 917 | 3.8 | 38 | 5 | 15 | 68 | 4.5 | 16 | 0 |
| 1988 | NO | 16 | 9 | 170 | 628 | 3.7 | 21 | 3 | 11 | 103 | 9.4 | 25 | 0 |
| 1989 | NO | 0 | 0 | Did not play due to injury | | | | | | | | | |
| 1990 | NO | 15 | 8 | 138 | 510 | 3.7 | 18 | 7 | 12 | 121 | 10.1 | 66 | 0 |
| 1992 | SEA | 16 | 0 | 28 | 74 | 2.6 | 14 | 0 | 2 | 13 | 6.5 | 7 | 0 |
| 1993 | SEA | 1 | 0 | 1 | 2 | 2.0 | 2 | 0 | 0 | 0 | 0.0 | 0 | 0 |
| Career | | 76 | 41 | 866 | 3,484 | 4.0 | 50 | 23 | 57 | 401 | 7.0 | 66 | 0 |

== Later life ==
After football, Mayes began a career in higher education administration and philanthropy. He later earned a masters of business administration degree. After 15 years in higher education leadership positions at Washington State University and the University of Washington, he transitioned to healthcare administration and philanthropy. He also spent five years as senior development officer at PeaceHealth System and 10 years as chief development and external relations officer at Pullman Regional Hospital. Currently he is the regional partnerships and philanthropy officer at Seattle Children's Hospital. His wife of 36 years, Marie Mayes, serves as the director of the Center for Entrepreneurial Studies and as a clinical assistant professor in the WSU Carson College of Business. Their oldest son Logan was a three-star recruited linebacker at Marist Catholic High School in Eugene, Oregon, and committed to play at Washington State, following his father's footsteps. He went on to graduate with a finance degree at California Polytechnic State University (Cal Poly). After graduating with an international business degree from the WSU Carson College of Business, younger son Kellen completed a two-year Peace Corps project in rural Albania. He was later a medical student at the University of Washington School of Medicine.

Mayes was once the most successful Canadian-born skilled player to play in the NFL and one of the only six Saskatchewan natives to make it to the NFL; the others were Arnie Weinmeister, Jon Ryan, Ben Heenan, Brett Boyko and Brett Jones. Mayes was the subject of a 1989 documentary film, The Saint from North Battleford, directed by Selwyn Jacob.
