= Ray Roberts (American football) =

American football player (born 1969)

- Roberts in 2026

No. 73, 72
- Position: Offensive tackle

Personal information
- Born: June 3, 1969 (age 57); Asheville, North Carolina, U.S.
- Listed height: 6 ft 6 in (1.98 m)
- Listed weight: 315 lb (143 kg)

Career information
- High school: Asheville (NC)
- College: Virginia
- NFL draft: 1992: 1st round, 10th overall pick

Career history
- Seattle Seahawks (1992–1995); Detroit Lions (1996–2001)

Awards and highlights
- 2× Jacobs Blocking Trophy (1990, 1991); First-team All-American (1991); 2× First-team All-ACC (1990, 1991); Second-team All-ACC (1989); Virginia Cavaliers Jersey No. 72 retired

Career NFL statistics
- Games played: 127
- Games started: 116
- Fumble recoveries: 5
- Stats at Pro Football Reference

Richard Ray Roberts Jr. (born June 3, 1969) is an American former professional football player. He played nine seasons in the National Football League (NFL) as an offensive tackle.

Born and raised in Asheville, North Carolina, Roberts graduated from Asheville High School in 1987 and played college football for the Virginia Cavaliers, where he won the Jacobs Trophy in 1990 & 1991 as the ACC's top blocker.

At 6 ft 6 in (1.98 m) and over 300 lb (136 kg), he was the tenth overall selection in the 1992 NFL draft, taken by the Seattle Seahawks. After four seasons in Seattle, he finished his career with the Detroit Lions.

Following his playing career, Roberts returned to the Seattle area and was an assistant football coach at Interlake High School in Bellevue. He earned a master's degree in intercollegiate athletic leadership from the University of Washington in 2007. Roberts also worked as a diversity specialist at Microsoft and did local sports radio for the Seahawks. He became the head coach at Lake Washington High School in Kirkland in 2008, and resigned in June 2010 after posting consecutive 1–8 seasons.

In 2011, Roberts returned to his alma mater, the University of Virginia, in Charlottesville, to become the director of life skills for the Cavaliers football program.

In 2015, Roberts moved back to Washington, where he worked at Rainier Scholars, a college enrichment program. Then in 2017, he left Rainier Scholars to work at Special Olympics where he currently works.

In 2022, Roberts launched a podcast called Big Ray's Garage Grind focusing on mental health and interviewing former Seahawks players on their journeys during their careers and after retirement, with guests including Tyler Lockett, Doug Baldwin, Cliff Avril and K.J. Wright.
