= Kelly Stouffer =

American football player (born 1964)

No. 11
- Position: Quarterback

Personal information
- Born: July 6, 1964 (age 62); Scottsbluff, Nebraska, U.S.
- Listed height: 6 ft 3 in (1.91 m)
- Listed weight: 210 lb (95 kg)

Career information
- High school: Rushville (Rushville, Nebraska)
- College: Colorado State
- NFL draft: 1987: 1st round, 6th overall pick

Career history
- Seattle Seahawks (1988–1992); Miami Dolphins (1994)*; Carolina Panthers (1996)*
- * Offseason or practice squad member only

Career NFL statistics
- Passing attempts: 437
- Passing completions: 225
- Completion percentage: 51.5%
- TD–INT: 7–19
- Passing yards: 2,333
- Passer rating: 54.5
- Stats at Pro Football Reference

Kelly Wayne Stouffer (born July 6, 1964) is an American former professional football player who was a quarterback in the National Football League (NFL). He played college football for the Colorado State Rams. Stouffer was selected in the first round of the 1987 NFL draft with the sixth overall pick. He spent most of his NFL career with the Seattle Seahawks from 1988 to 1992.

== Early life ==
Born in Scottsbluff, Nebraska, Stouffer graduated from Rushville High School in northwestern Nebraska and played college football at Colorado State University in Fort Collins.

== College career statistics ==
Legend
**Bold**	Career high

Year	Team	Games	Passing							
Year	Team	GP	Cmp	Att	Pct	Yds	Y/A	TD	Int	Rtg
1984	Colorado State	9	168	295	56.9	2,151	**7.3**	14	13	**125.0**
1985	Colorado State	**12**	204	346	**59.0**	2,387	6.9	**15**	11	124.9
1986	Colorado State	11	**205**	**374**	54.8	**2,604**	7.0	7	**14**	112.0
Career		32	577	1,015	56.8	7,142	7.0	36	38	120.2

== NFL career ==
Pre-draft measurables
Height	Weight	40-yard dash	10-yard split	20-yard split	20-yard shuttle	Vertical jump	Broad jump
6 ft 3 in (1.91 m)	212 lb (96 kg)	4.95 s	1.73 s	2.84 s	4.51 s	28.0 in (0.71 m)	9 ft 0 in (2.74 m)
All values from NFL Combine

At the conclusion of Stouffer's collegiate career, he gained notoriety when, after being selected by the St. Louis Cardinals in the first round (sixth overall) of the 1987 NFL draft, he sat out what would have been his rookie year due to a contract dispute.

The following April, the Cardinals traded Stouffer's rights to the Seattle Seahawks for three draft picks, who listed Stouffer as third-string behind starter Dave Krieg and veteran backup Jeff Kemp in 1988. Krieg was sidelined in the third game with a separated shoulder, and the following week Kemp was ineffective and was benched in favor of Stouffer by halftime. Stouffer endeared himself to Seattle fans in one play where, after stumbling and having his nose broken when it collided with a teammate's elbow, he threw for a long gain resulting in a touchdown against the San Francisco 49ers. Stouffer filled in for nearly two months, until Krieg returned to the lineup in mid-November; Seattle won the division (AFC West) with a 9–7 record, but lost in the divisional round of the AFC playoffs to top-seeded Cincinnati. Stouffer seemed to regress in the eyes of Seahawk coaches over the next couple of years, and fell back to third string, behind Kemp.

Following the 1991 season, head coach Chuck Knox was replaced by Tom Flores and Krieg was released. Stouffer won the starting job in 1992, ahead of Dan McGwire and Stan Gelbaugh. Stouffer was injured in week 5, as the Seahawks started the season 1–4. After McGwire was quickly injured, journeyman Gelbaugh became the starter, yielding the job to Stouffer once Stouffer recovered. Stouffer, who seemed to have been showing a return to his rookie form just before his injury, was never the same, however, and Gelbaugh quickly became the established starter.

The following season, Stouffer was released; he was signed by the Miami Dolphins to a free agent contract in April 1994 but was released prior to the regular season. Two years later, Stouffer was signed by the Carolina Panthers to a free agent contract in March 1996 but was released prior to the regular season.

== After football ==
In 2000, Stouffer finished his B.S. degree in biology from the Colorado State University College of Agricultural Sciences and became the first undergraduate to earn that degree via the college's distance learning program.

Stouffer is a television color analyst for college football games on ESPN/ABC, and was formerly with the NFL on FOX, Versus, MountainWest Sports Network and Minnesota Vikings pre-season games.
