= 1996 CFL draft =

Canadian football draft

The 1996 CFL draft took place on May 31, 1996. 61 Canadian football players were chosen from eligible Canadian universities as well as Canadian players playing in the NCAA. This would be the last time that a CFL draft would have seven rounds, switching to six rounds in 1997, until the league reverted to seven in 2013. The Edmonton Eskimos obtained the first overall pick, along with Nick Mazzoli, from the Ottawa Rough Riders in exchange for Dan Murphy and Jay Chistenson. In the fifth round, the Montreal Alouettes drafted defensive end James Eggink who had died from cancer in December 1995. The Edmonton Eskimos obtained the first overall pick, along with Nick Mazzoli, from the Ottawa Rough Riders in exchange for Dan Murphy and Jay Chistenson.

== Round one ==
= CFL Division All-Star	= CFL All-Star	= Hall of Famer

Pick #	CFL team	Player	Position	School
1	Edmonton Eskimos (via Ottawa)	Donnavan Blair	SB	Calgary
2	Toronto Argonauts	Kelly Wiltshire	CB	James Madison
3	Saskatchewan Roughriders	Mike Sutherland	OL	Northern Illinois
4	Winnipeg Blue Bombers	Andrew Henry	DB	C.W. Post
5	Hamilton Tiger-Cats	Justin Ring	LB	Simon Fraser
6	BC Lions	Mark Pimisken	LB	Washington State
7	Edmonton	Duane Arrindell	OL	Northern Illinois
8	Calgary Stampeders	Farell Duclair	LB	Concordia
9	Montreal Alouettes	Denis Montana	WR	Concordia

== Round two ==
= CFL Division All-Star	= CFL All-Star	= Hall of Famer

Pick #	CFL team	Player	Position	School
10	Hamilton	Kyle Walters	RB	Guelph
11	Winnipeg	Harry Van Hofwegen	DL	Carleton
12	Saskatchewan	Tom Monois	WR	Northeastern
13	Winnipeg	Sean Reade	RB	Western Ontario
14	Hamilton	Mike Mehelic	OT	Indiana
15	BC	Andrew English	WR	British Columbia
16	Edmonton	Jayson Hamilton	RB	Alberta
17	Calgary	Rob Robinson	DT	Cincinnati
18	Montreal	Bryan Chiu	DT	Washington State

== Round three ==
= CFL Division All-Star	= CFL All-Star	= Hall of Famer

Pick #	CFL team	Player	Position	School
19	Ottawa	Sammie Brennan	DB	University
20	Toronto	L.J. Eiben	WR	Humboldt State
21	Calgary	Jean-Agnes Charles	DB	Michigan
22	Winnipeg	Shane Speena	LB	Henderson State
23	Saskatchewan	Alton Francis	RB/K	Northern Illinois
24	BC	Brad Yamaoka	RB	British Columbia
25	Edmonton	Sheldon Napastuk	DT	Iowa State
26	Calgary	Cory Stevens	P/K	Minot State
27	Montreal	Adam Cassidy	OL	Alberta

== Round four ==
Pick #	CFL team	Player	Position	School
28	Ottawa	Grayson Shillingford	SB	British Columbia
29	Saskatchewan	Paul Frian	LB	St. Francis Xavier
30	Saskatchewan	Dwayne Ell	DL	North Dakota
31	Winnipeg	Leonard Jean-Pierre	RB	York
32	Hamilton	Dan Brown	FB/RB	Bemidji State
33	BC	Kevin Ho-Young	RB	St. Francis Xavier
34	Edmonton	Murray Cunningham	DL	Alberta
35	Calgary	Vito Greco	LB/FB	Carleton
36	Montreal	Tom Hipsz	DE	Toronto

== Round five ==
Pick #	CFL team	Player	Position	School
37	Ottawa	Darcy Curtis	DT/OL	Simon Fraser
38	Ottawa	George Savard	OL	Ottawa
39	Saskatchewan	Nelson Van Waes	SB/LB	Tulsa
40	Winnipeg	Stuart MacKenzie	OT	Western Kentucky
41	Hamilton	Paul Kent	OL	Kutztown
42	BC	Victor Bryna	DB	Simon Fraser
43	Edmonton	Joe Saul	DE	Saskatchewan
44	Calgary	Jung-Yul Kim	OT	Toronto

== Round six ==
Pick #	CFL team	Player	Position	School
45	Ottawa	Robert McElwain	DB	Windsor
46	Toronto	Tim Biakabutuka	RB	Michigan
47	Saskatchewan	Chris Flory	OL	Saskatchewan
48	Winnipeg	Mark Holmstrom	LB	Manitoba
49	Hamilton	Troy Russel	DB	Bishop's
50	BC	Bryan Bourne	OL	British Columbia
51	Edmonton	Darcy Park	FB	Alberta
52	Calgary	David Lane	OL	Simon Fraser
53	Montreal	Adrian Rainbow	QB	British Columbia

== Round seven ==
Pick #	CFL team	Player	Position	School
54	Ottawa	Michael Hendricks	LB	Ottawa
55	Toronto	Craig Poole	WR	Windsor
56	Saskatchewan	Greg Moe	K	Saskatchewan
57	Winnipeg	Gerald Lewis	LB	Eastern Michigan
58	Hamilton	David Burnie	DE	Western Ontario
59	BC	Paul Greenhow	CD	Queen's
60	Edmonton	Troy Shwetz	DB	Jamestown College
61	Montreal	Marc Charles	DT	Morgan State
