= Mike Sutherland =

Canadian football player (born 1971)

No. 63
- Position: Guard

Personal information
- Born: June 25, 1971 (age 55); Ottawa, Ontario, Canada
- Listed height: 6 ft 3 in (1.91 m)
- Listed weight: 350 lb (159 kg)

Career information
- College: Northern Illinois
- CFL draft: 1996: 1st round, 3rd overall pick

Career history
- 1996: Saskatchewan Roughriders
- 1996–2000: Montreal Alouettes
- 2001–2002: Winnipeg Blue Bombers
- 2003–2005: Ottawa Renegades
- Stats at CFL.ca

Michael Sutherland (born June 25, 1971, in Ottawa, Ontario) is a Canadian former professional football offensive lineman who played ten seasons for four teams in the Canadian Football League. Sutherland is now an analyst on RDS television and broadcaster on Ottawa radio stations CFRA and TSN 1200.
