= 1992 Seattle Seahawks season =

American football team season

- Owner: Ken Behring
- General manager: Tom Flores
- Head coach: Tom Flores
- Offensive coordinator: Larry Kennan
- Defensive coordinator: Rusty Tillman
- Home stadium: Kingdome

Results
- Record: 2–14
- Division place: 5th AFC West
- Playoffs: Did not qualify
- All-Pros: DT Cortez Kennedy (1st team)
- Pro Bowlers: DT Cortez Kennedy; FS Eugene Robinson

The 1992 Seattle Seahawks season was the team's 17th season with the National Football League (NFL). This was the first of three seasons in Seattle for head coach Tom Flores, but the Seahawks' winning percentage (.125) remains the worst in franchise history.

The Seahawks' 140 points (8.8 points per game) scored in the regular season is the lowest total for any team playing a 16-game (minimum) season. Long-time quarterback Dave Krieg had left Seattle for the rival Kansas City Chiefs in the offseason, leaving Seattle with Kelly Stouffer, Stan Gelbaugh, and Dan McGwire (brother of Major League Baseball star Mark McGwire) as their three quarterbacks.

Football Outsiders called Seattle's 1992 offense "the worst offense in (their ranking system's) history." Seattle's 1,778 passing yards are the fewest in a season by any team during the 1990s. The teams's 3,374 all-purpose yards are the lowest by a team in a 16-game (minimum) season in NFL history; they had 31 fewer total yards than the previous record-holders, the 1988 Detroit Lions, who had 3,405 all-purpose yards just four seasons prior. Seattle was so inept that from the first game of the season until their Week 13 overtime win over Denver, they collectively had fewer points scored than punts attempted; for the entire season, the team finished with only slightly more points than punts. The team failed to score more than 17 points in a single game.

Despite their historically inept offense, Football Outsiders also ranked Seattle as having the third-best defense in 1992, making them the most imbalanced team they had ever measured. The Seahawks' star defensive tackle Cortez Kennedy was named the 1992 NFL Defensive Player of the Year. Seattle gave up the fourth-fewest passing yards (2,661), and tied for fewest passing touchdowns allowed (11) of any team in 1992.

Before their Monday Night Football victory over the Denver Broncos in the Kingdome in late November, the Seahawks honored radio announcer Pete Gross, inducting him as the fourth member of the Ring of Honor, its first non-player. After his long bout with cancer, Gross died two days later at age 55. That game was also the last MNF game played in the Kingdome and the last in Seattle until 2002.

== Offseason ==
Additions	Subtractions
G Sean Farrell (Broncos)	WR Jeff Chadwick (Rams)
QB Stan Gelbaugh (Cardinals)	RB Derrick Fenner (Bengals)
FB Tracy Johnson (Falcons)	QB Dave Krieg (Chiefs)
RB Rueben Mayes (Saints)	TE Travis McNeal (Rams)
	WR Paul Skansi (CFL)
	TE Mike Tice (Vikings)

=== NFL draft ===
1992 Seattle Seahawks draft
Round	Pick	Player	Position	College	Notes
1	10	Ray Roberts	Offensive tackle	Virginia	
3	66	Bob Spitulski	Linebacker	Central Florida	
5	122	Gary Dandridge	Safety	Appalachian State	
6	150	Michael Bates *	Wide receiver	Arizona	
7	178	Mike Frier	Defensive end	Appalachian State	
8	207	Muhammad Shamsid-Deen	Running back	Tennessee-Chattanooga	
9	234	Larry Stayner	Tight end	Boise State	
10	263	Anthony Hamlet	Defensive end	Miami (FL)	
11	290	Kris Rongen	Guard	Washington	
12	319	Chico Fraley	Linebacker	Washington	
12	320	John MacNeil	Defensive end	Michigan State	
Made roster * Made at least one Pro Bowl during career

=== Undrafted free agents ===
1992 undrafted free agents of note
Player	Position	College
Randy Cole	Linebacker	UCLA
Andy Conner	Linebacker	Oregon
Jeb Flesch	Center	Clemson
James Harris	Defensive End	Temple
Mike Jovanovich	Tackle	Boston College
Bryan May	Guard	BYU
Joe Mero	Cornerback	LSU
Rod Moore	Wide receiver	Utah State
Gary Needham	Tackle	Eastern Washington
James Robinson	Tackle	Texas Southern
Rafael Robinson	Cornerback	Wisconsin
Tyrone Rodgers	Defensive End	Washington
Don Silvestri	Kicker	Pittsburgh
Michael Sturdivant	Wide receiver	Virginia Tech
Greg Thomas	Safety	Colorado
Brian Treggs	Wide receiver	California
Jason Wilborn	Linebacker	California
Steve Wilks	Cornerback	Appalachian State

== Personnel ==
=== Staff ===
1992 Seattle Seahawks staff
**Front office**: Owner – Ken Behring; Executive vice president – Mickey Loomis; Vice president of football operations – Chuck Allen; Player personnel director – Mike Allman; Pro personnel director – Randy Mueller; Assistant player personnel director – Rick Thompson; **Head coaches**: President/head coach – Tom Flores; Assistant head coach/defense – Tom Catlin; **Offensive coaches**: Offensive coordinator/quarterbacks – Larry Kennan; Running backs – Clarence Shelmon; Wide receivers – Bob Bratkowski; Tight ends – Russ Purnell; Offensive line – Hudson Houck	**Defensive coaches**: Defensive coordinator/linebackers – Rusty Tillman; Defensive line – Tommy Brasher; Defensive backs – Paul Moyer; Defensive – Dave Brown; **Special teams coaches**: Special teams – Russ Purnell; **Strength and conditioning**: Strength and conditioning – Frank Raines

=== Final roster ===
1992 Seattle Seahawks roster
**Quarterbacks (QB)**: **18** Stan Gelbaugh; 7 Jeff Graham; 11 Kelly Stouffer; **Running backs (RB)**: 43 Tracy Johnson; 30 James Jones FB; 36 Rueben Mayes; **42** Chris Warren; **32** John L. Williams FB; **Wide receivers (WR)**: 89 Brian Blades; 88 David Daniels; **81** Tommy Kane; 85 Doug Thomas; 23 Robb Thomas; 21 Brian Treggs; **Tight ends (TE)**: **82** Ron Heller; 83 Trey Junkin LS	**Offensive linemen (OL)**: 61 Theo Adams T; **64** Darrick Brilz G; 62 Sean Farrell G; 54 Grant Feasel C; **66** Andy Heck G; **76** Bill Hitchcock T; 78 Mike Keim T; **73** Ray Roberts T; **56** Joe Tofflemire C; **Defensive linemen (DL)**: **77** Jeff Bryant DE; **99** Cortez Kennedy DT; **72** Joe Nash DT; 91 Tyrone Rodgers DT; 70 Michael Sinclair DE; 62 Natu Tuatagaloa DE; **57** Tony Woods DE	**Linebackers (LB)**: 59 Joe Cain OLB; 58 Greg Clark OLB; 53 E. J. Junior OLB; 52 Richard Newbill MLB; **97** Rufus Porter OLB; 94 Rod Stephens MLB; **Defensive backs (DB)**: **25** Robert Blackmon SS; 34 Brian Davis CB; 31 Malcolm Frank CB; **29** Dwayne Harper CB; **27** Patrick Hunter CB; **41** Eugene Robinson FS; 37 Rafael Robinson SS; **Special teams (ST)**: 4 John Kasay K; 14 Rick Tuten P	**Practice squad**: 50 Anthony Davis LB; 47 Darian McKinney TE; 16 Terry Obee WR; 24 Muhammad Shamsid-Deen RB; **Reserve**: **84** Louis Clark WR (IR); 51 Marcus Cotton LB (IR); 33 Dedrick Dodge S (IR); 22 Nesby Glasgow S (IR); 87 Paul Green TE (IR); 12 Rusty Hilger QB/Ret.; 68 John Hunter T (IR); 20 James Jefferson CB (IR); 63 Ronnie Lee T (IR); 26 Vann McElroy S (IR); 10 Dan McGwire QB (IR); 71 Bryan Millard G (IR); 55 Bob Spitulski LB (IR); 48 Larry Stayner TE (IR); **90** Terry Wooden LB (IR); **92** Dave Wyman LB (IR); Rookies in italics 47 active, 16 reserve, 4 practice squad

- Starters in bold.
- (*) Denotes players that were selected for the 1993 Pro Bowl.

== Schedule ==
=== Preseason ===
Week	Date	Opponent	Result	Record	Venue	Recap
1	August 6	Los Angeles Rams	**L** 7–21	0–1	Kingdome	Recap
2	August 15	at Indianapolis Colts	**W** 27–10	1–1	Hoosier Dome	Recap
3	August 22	Phoenix Cardinals	**W** 17–10	2–1	Kingdome	Recap
4	August 28	at San Francisco 49ers	**L** 17–24	2–2	Candlestick Park	Recap

Source: Seahawks Media Guides

=== Regular season ===
Divisional matchups have the AFC West playing the NFC East.

Week	Date	Opponent	Result	Record	Venue	Recap
1	September 6	Cincinnati Bengals	**L** 3–21	0–1	Kingdome	Recap
2	September 13	at **Kansas City Chiefs**	**L** 7–26	0–2	Arrowhead Stadium	Recap
3	September 20	at New England Patriots	**W** 10–6	1–2	Foxboro Stadium	Recap
4	September 27	Miami Dolphins	**L** 17–19	1–3	Kingdome	Recap
5	October 4	at **San Diego Chargers**	**L** 6–17	1–4	Jack Murphy Stadium	Recap
6	October 11	at Dallas Cowboys	**L** 0–27	1–5	Texas Stadium	Recap
7	October 18	**Los Angeles Raiders**	**L** 0–19	1–6	Kingdome	Recap
8	October 25	at New York Giants	**L** 10–23	1–7	Giants Stadium	Recap
9	Bye					
10	November 8	Washington Redskins	**L** 3–16	1–8	Kingdome	Recap
11	November 15	at **Los Angeles Raiders**	**L** 3–20	1–9	Los Angeles Memorial Coliseum	Recap
12	November 22	**Kansas City Chiefs**	**L** 14–24	1–10	Kingdome	Recap
13	November 30	**Denver Broncos**	**W** 16–13 (OT)	2–10	Kingdome	Recap
14	December 6	at Pittsburgh Steelers	**L** 14–20	2–11	Three Rivers Stadium	Recap
15	December 13	Philadelphia Eagles	**L** 17–20 (OT)	2–12	Kingdome	Recap
16	December 20	at **Denver Broncos**	**L** 6–10	2–13	Mile High Stadium	Recap
17	December 27	**San Diego Chargers**	**L** 14–31	2–14	Kingdome	Recap
Note: Intra-division opponents are in **bold** text.

Source: 1992 NFL season results

== Standings ==
AFC West
	W	L	T	PCT	DIV	CONF	PF	PA	STK
^{(3)} San Diego Chargers	11	5	0	.688	5–3	9–5	335	241	W7
^{(6)} Kansas City Chiefs	10	6	0	.625	6–2	8–4	348	282	W1
Denver Broncos	8	8	0	.500	4–4	7–5	262	329	L1
Los Angeles Raiders	7	9	0	.438	4–4	5–7	249	281	W1
Seattle Seahawks	2	14	0	.125	1–7	2–10	140	312	L4

== Game summaries ==
=== Preseason ===
==== Week P1: vs. Los Angeles Rams ====
Preseason Week One: Seattle Seahawks vs. Los Angeles Rams – Game summary

Quarter	1	2	3	4	Total
Rams	7	7	7	0	21
Seahawks	7	0	0	0	7

at Kingdome, Seattle

- Date: August 6
- Game time: 6:06 pm local
- Game weather: indoors
- Game attendance: 53,360
- Referee: Pat Haggerty
- TV: KING
- Gamebook

==== Week P2: at Indianapolis Colts ====
Preseason Week Two: Seattle Seahawks at Indianapolis Colts – Game summary

Quarter	1	2	3	4	Total
Seahawks	3	7	10	7	27
Colts	0	10	0	0	10

at Hoosier Dome, Indianapolis

- Date: August 15
- Game time: 7:30 pm local
- Game weather: indoors
- Game attendance: 43,272
- Referee: Red Cashion
- TV: KING
- Gamebook

==== Week P3: vs. Phoenix Cardinals ====
Preseason Week Three: Seattle Seahawks vs. Phoenix Cardinals – Game summary

Quarter	1	2	3	4	Total
Cardinals	0	3	0	7	10
Seahawks	7	7	3	0	17

at Kingdome, Seattle

- Date: August 22
- Game time: 7:08 pm local
- Game weather: indoors
- Game attendance: 51,007
- Referee: Dick Hantak
- TV: KING
- Gamebook

==== Week P4: at San Francisco 49ers ====
Preseason Week Four: Seattle Seahawks at San Francisco 49ers – Game summary

Quarter	1	2	3	4	Total
Seahawks	0	0	3	14	17
49ers	7	17	0	0	24

at Candlestick Park, San Francisco

- Date: August 28
- Game time: 5:03 pm local
- Game weather: clear, 70 °F (21 °C), 60% humidity, wind NW 22 miles per hour (35 km/h)
- Game attendance: 52,822
- Referee: Howard Roe
- TV: KING
- Gamebook

=== Regular season ===
==== Week 1: vs. Cincinnati Bengals ====
Week One: Seattle Seahawks vs. Cincinnati Bengals – Game summary

Quarter	1	2	3	4	Total
Bengals	0	7	0	14	21
Seahawks	3	0	0	0	3

at Kingdome, Seattle

- Date: September 6
- Game time: 1:00 pm local
- Game weather: indoors
- Game attendance: 57,350
- Referee: Ed Hochuli
- TV announcers (NBC): Don Criqui, Paul Maguire
- Gamebook

Game information

First quarter

- SEA – John Kasay 40-yard field goal, 10:12 (SEA 3–0)

Second quarter

- CIN – Ray Bentley 75-yard fumble return (Jim Breech kick), 9:44 (CIN 7–3)

Third quarter

- No scoring plays

Fourth quarter

- CIN – Eric Ball 1-yard run (Jim Breech kick), 11:32 (CIN 14–3)
- CIN – Fernandus Vinson 22-yard fumble return (Jim Breech kick), 8:17 (CIN 21–3)

Top passers

- CIN – Boomer Esiason: 18/29, 115 yds, 1 INT
- SEA – Kelly Stouffer: 15/33, 172 yds

Top rushers

- CIN – Harold Green: 21 car, 123 yds
- SEA – Chris Warren: 14 car, 49 yds

Top receivers

- CIN – Reggie Rembert: 5 rec, 47 yds
- SEA – Louis Clark: 5 rec, 69 yds

Team – pass – rush – total – to

- CIN – 102 – 167 – 269 – 2
- SEA –110 – 92 – 202 – 2

==== Week 2: at Kansas City Chiefs ====
Week Two: Seattle Seahawks at Kansas City Chiefs – Game summary

Quarter	1	2	3	4	Total
Seahawks	0	7	0	0	7
Chiefs	7	6	7	6	26

at Arrowhead Stadium, Kansas City, Missouri

- Date: September 13
- Game time: 12:00 pm local
- Game weather: clear, 77 °F (25 °C), 66% humidity, wind S 22 miles per hour (35 km/h)
- Game attendance: 75,125
- Referee: Jerry Markbreit
- TV announcers (NBC): Dan Hicks & Joe Namath
- Gamebook

Game information

First quarter

- KC – J.J. Birden 72-yard pass from Dave Krieg (Nick Lowery kick), 13:21 (KC 7–0)

Second quarter

- SEA – Paul Green 3-yard pass from Kelly Stouffer (John Kasay kick), 9:57 (Tied 7–7)
- KC – Nick Lowery 26-yard field goal, 1:08 (KC 10–7)
- KC – Nick Lowery 32-yard field goal, 0:06 (KC 13–7)
- KC – Lonnie Marts 36-yard interception return (Nick Lowery kick), 5:07 (KC 20–7)

Third quarter

- No scoring plays

Fourth quarter

- KC – Barry Word 2-yard run (PAT failed), 14:16 (KC 26–7)

Top passers

- SEA – Kelly Stouffer: 13/31, 106 yds, 1 TD, 2 INT
- KC – Dave Krieg: 13/19, 231 yds, 1 TD

Top rushers

- SEA – Chris Warren: 12 car, 53 yds
- KC – Christian Okoye: 18 car, 63 yds

Top receivers

- SEA – Paul Green: 5 rec, 41 yds, 1 TD
- KC – J.J. Birden: 1 rec, 72 yds, 1 TD

Team – pass – rush – total – to

- SEA – 98 – 91 – 189 – 4
- KC – 206 – 115 – 321 – 1

==== Week 3: at New England Patriots ====
Week Three: Seattle Seahawks at New England Patriots – Game summary

Quarter	1	2	3	4	Total
Seahawks	7	0	0	3	10
Patriots	0	0	6	0	6

at Sullivan Stadium, Foxborough, Massachusetts

- Date: September 20
- Game time: 1:01 pm local
- Game weather: clear, 68 °F (20 °C), 55% humidity, wind NE 9 miles per hour (14 km/h)
- Game attendance: 42,327
- Referee: Gerry Austin
- TV announcers (NBC): Tom Hammond & Cris Collinsworth
- Gamebook

Game information

First quarter

- SEA – Chris Warren 2-yard run (John Kasay kick), 9:18 (SEA 7–0)

Second quarter

- No scoring plays

Third quarter

- NE – Irving Fryar 36-yard pass from Hugh Millen (PAT failed), 7:44 (SEA 7–6)

Fourth quarter

- SEA – John Kasay 25-yard field goal, 12:02 (SEA 10–6)

Top passers

- SEA – Kelly Stouffer: 14/28, 116 yds
- NE – Hugh Millen: 17/27, 185 yds, 1 TD, 1 INT

Top rushers

- SEA – Chris Warren: 24 car, 122 yds, 1 TD
- NE – Leonard Russell: 18 car, 81 yds

Top receivers

- SEA – Tommy Kane: 2 rec, 48 yds
- NE – Irving Fryar: 6 rec, 101 yds, 1 TD

Team – pass – rush – total – to

- SEA – 110 – 140 – 250 – 0
- NE – 146 – 99 – 245 – 3

==== Week 4: vs. Miami Dolphins ====
Week Four: Seattle Seahawks vs. Miami Dolphins – Game summary

Quarter	1	2	3	4	Total
Dolphins	3	3	3	10	19
Seahawks	0	10	0	7	17

at Kingdome, Seattle

- Date: September 27
- Game time: 1:04 pm local
- Game weather: indoors
- Game attendance: 59,374
- Referee: Red Cashion
- TV announcers (NBC): Jim Lampley & Ahmad Rashad
- Gamebook

Game information

First quarter

- MIA – Pete Stoyanovich 53-yard field goal, 10:07 (MIA 3–0)

Second quarter

- SEA – Louis Clark 26-yard pass from Kelly Stouffer (John Kasay kick), 12:12 (SEA 7–3)
- SEA – John Kasay 35-yard field goal, 8:49 (SEA 10–3)
- MIA – Pete Stoyanovich 31-yard field goal, 1:48 (SEA 10–6)

Third quarter

- MIA – Pete Stoyanovich 37-yard field goal, 6:21 (SEA 10–9)

Fourth quarter

- MIA – Pete Stoyanovich 27-yard field goal, 13:36 (MIA 12–10)
- SEA – John L. Williams 4-yard run (John Kasay kick), 9:51 (SEA 17–12)
- MIA – Fred Banks 15-yard pass from Dan Marino (Pete Stoyanovich kick), 2:15 (MIA 19–17)

Top passers

- MIA – Dan Marino: 23/39, 254 yds, 1 TD, 3 INT
- SEA – Kelly Stouffer: 16/28, 166 yds, 1 TD, 1 INT

Top rushers

- MIA – Mark Higgs: 21 car, 54 yds
- SEA – Chris Warren: 13 car, 47 yds

Top receivers

- MIA – Tony Martin: 5 rec, 72 yds
- SEA – Louis Clark: 4 rec, 61 yds, 1 TD

Team – pass – rush – total – to

- MIA – 255 – 59 – 314 – 4
- SEA – 135 – 86 – 221 – 2

==== Week 5: at San Diego Chargers ====
Week Five: Seattle Seahawks at San Diego Chargers – Game summary

Quarter	1	2	3	4	Total
Seahawks	0	3	3	0	6
Chargers	10	7	0	0	17

at San Diego Stadium, San Diego, California

- Date: October 4
- Game time: 1:01 pm local
- Game weather: clear, 73 °F (23 °C), 43% humidity, wind WSW 13 miles per hour (21 km/h)
- Game attendance: 36,783
- Referee: Johnny Grier
- TV announcers (NBC): Don Criqui, Paul Maguire
- Gamebook

Game information

First quarter

- SD – Anthony Miller 67-yard pass from Stan Humphries (John Carney kick), 12:24 (SD 7–0)
- SD – John Carney 49-yard field goal, 3:48 (SD 10–0)

Second quarter

- SEA – John Kasay 27-yard field goal, 11:37 (SD 10–3)
- SD – Anthony Miller 5-yard pass from Stan Humphries (John Carney kick), 0:12 (SD 17–3)

Third quarter

- SEA – John Kasay 29-yard field goal, 2:02 (SD 17–6)

Fourth quarter

- No scoring plays

Top passers

- SEA – Dan McGwire: 12/21, 70 yds, 3 INT
- SD – Stan Humphries: 15/28, 200 yds, 2 TD

Top rushers

- SEA – Chris Warren: 13 car, 76 yds
- SD – Rod Bernstine: 18 car, 74 yds

Top receivers

- SEA – John L. Williams: 7 rec, 51 yds
- SD – Anthony Miller: 9 rec, 142 yds, 2 TD

Team – pass – rush – total – to

- SEA – 70 – 110 – 180 – 3
- SD – 195 – 107 – 302 – 0

==== Week 6: at Dallas Cowboys ====
Week Six: Seattle Seahawks at Dallas Cowboys – Game summary

Quarter	1	2	3	4	Total
Seahawks	0	0	0	0	0
Cowboys	7	13	7	0	27

at Texas Stadium, Irving, Texas

- Date: October 11
- Game time: 12:00 pm local
- Game weather: clear, 71 °F (22 °C), 45% humidity, wind sheltered
- Game attendance: 62,311
- Referee: Bernie Kukar
- TV announcers (NBC): Marv Albert & Bill Parcells
- Gamebook

Game information

First quarter

- DAL – Emmitt Smith 2-yard run (Lin Elliott kick), 11:17 (DAL 7–0)

Second quarter

- DAL – Emmitt Smith 1-yard run (Lin Elliott kick), 9:24 (DAL 14–0)
- DAL – Lin Elliott 31-yard field goal, 6:48 (DAL 17–0)
- DAL – Lin Elliott 51-yard field goal, 1:51 (DAL 20–0)

Third quarter

- DAL – Ray Horton 15-yard interception return (Lin Elliott kick), 4:44 (DAL 27–0)

Fourth quarter

- No scoring plays

Top passers

- SEA – Dan McGwire: 5/9, 46 yds
- DAL – Troy Aikman: 15/23, 173 yds, 2 INT

Top rushers

- SEA – Chris Warren: 7 car, 14 yds
- DAL – Emmitt Smith: 22 car, 78 yds, 2 TD

Top receivers

- SEA – Robb Thomas: 3 rec, 28 yds
- DAL – Michael Irvin: 6 rec, 113 yds

Team – pass – rush – total – to

- SEA – 24 – 38 – 62 – 3
- DAL – 197 – 116 – 313 – 2

==== Week 7: vs. Los Angeles Raiders ====
Week Seven: Seattle Seahawks vs. Los Angeles Raiders – Game summary

Quarter	1	2	3	4	Total
Raiders	0	12	0	7	19
Seahawks	0	0	0	0	0

at Kingdome, Seattle

- Date: October 18
- Game time: 1:02 pm local
- Game weather: indoors
- Game attendance: 56,904
- Referee: Jerry Markbreit
- TV announcers (NBC): Jim Lampley & Ahmad Rashad
- Gamebook

Game information

First quarter

- No scoring plays

Second quarter

- LA – Willie Gault 4-yard pass from Jay Schroeder (Jeff Jaeger kick), 11:27 (LA 7–0)
- LA – Jeff Jaeger 53-yard field goal, 8:27 (LA 10–0)
- LA – Safety, Nolan Harrison tackled Bill Hitchcock in end zone, 0:55 (LA 12–0)

Third quarter

- No scoring plays

Fourth quarter

- LA – Nick Bell 66-yard run (Jeff Jaeger kick), 12:56 (LA 19–0)

Top passers

- LA – Jay Schroeder: 9/19, 84 yds, 1 TD
- SEA – Stan Gelbaugh: 17/41, 238 yds, 1 INT

Top rushers

- LA – Nick Bell: 10 car, 97 yds, 1 TD
- SEA – Chris Warren: 6 car, 18 yds

Top receivers

- LA – Andrew Glover: 2 rec, 32 yds
- SEA – Louis Clark: 4 rec, 72 yds

Team – pass – rush – total – to

- LA – 69 – 179 – 248 – 1
- SEA – 196 – 41 – 237 – 2

==== Week 8: at New York Giants ====
Week Eight: Seattle Seahawks at New York Giants – Game summary

Quarter	1	2	3	4	Total
Seahawks	0	3	7	0	10
Giants	0	6	14	3	23

at Giants Stadium, East Rutherford, New Jersey

- Date: October 25
- Game time: 1:01 pm local
- Game weather: cloudy, 51 °F (10.6 °C), 50% humidity, wind NW 21 miles per hour (34 km/h)
- Game attendance: 67,399
- Referee: Ed Hochuli
- TV announcers (NBC): Marv Albert and Bill Parcells
- Gamebook

Game information

First quarter

- No scoring plays

Second quarter

- NYG – Matt Bahr 36-yard field goal, 12:49 (NYG 3–0)
- SEA – John Kasay 33-yard field goal, 7:28 (Tied 3–3)
- NYG – Matt Bahr 25-yard field goal, 0:00 (NYG 6–3)

Third quarter

- SEA – Tommy Kane 13-yard pass from Stan Gelbaugh (John Kasay kick), 11:37 (SEA 10–6)
- NYG – Jeff Hostetler 7-yard run (Matt Bahr kick), 8:05 (NYG 13–10)
- NYG – Ed McCaffrey 7-yard pass from Jeff Hostetler (Matt Bahr kick), 0:56 (NYG 20–10)

Fourth quarter

- NYG – Matt Bahr 30-yard field goal, 7:01 (NYG 23–10)

Top passers

- SEA – Stan Gelbaugh: 22/32, 130 yds, 1 TD, 1 INT
- NYG – Jeff Hostetler: 5/9, 94 yds, 1 TD

Top rushers

- SEA – John L. Williams: 11 car, 44 yds
- NYG – Jarrod Bunch: 12 car, 77 yds

Top receivers

- SEA – John L. Williams: 11 rec, 45 yds
- NYG – Stephen Baker: 1 rec, 46 yds

Team – pass – rush – total – to

- SEA – 108 – 78 – 186 – 2
- NYG – 85 – 176 – 261 – 2

==== Week 10: vs. Washington Redskins ====
Week Ten: Seattle Seahawks vs. Washington Redskins – Game summary

Quarter	1	2	3	4	Total
Redskins	0	3	6	7	16
Seahawks	0	3	0	0	3

at Kingdome, Seattle

- Date: November 8
- Game time: 1:02 pm local
- Game weather: indoors
- Game attendance: 53,616
- Referee: Dale Hamer
- TV announcers (CBS): Tim Ryan & Dan Fouts
- Gamebook

Game information

First quarter

- No scoring plays

Second quarter

- SEA – John Kasay 22-yard field goal, 5:03 (SEA 3–0)
- WAS – Chip Lohmiller 48-yard field goal, 0:41 (Tied 3–3)

Third quarter

- WAS – Chip Lohmiller 33-yard field goal, 8:15 (WAS 6–3)
- WAS – Chip Lohmiller 37-yard field goal, 1:04 (WAS 9–3)

Fourth quarter

- WAS – Terry Orr 26-yard pass from Mark Rypien (Chip Lohmiller kick), 10:28 (WAS 16–3)

Top passers

- WAS – Mark Rypien: 21/30, 248 yds, 1 TD, 1 INT
- SEA – Stan Gelbaugh: 9/24, 75 yds, 2 INT

Top rushers

- WAS – Earnest Byner: 13 car, 47 yds
- SEA – Chris Warren: 19 car, 103 yds

Top receivers

- WAS – Terry Orr: 3 rec, 82 yds, 1 TD
- SEA – James Jones: 3 rec, 30 yds

Team – pass – rush – total – to

- WAS – 242 – 88 – 330 – 1
- SEA – 59 – 124 – 183 – 3

==== Week 11: at Los Angeles Raiders ====
Week Eleven: Seattle Seahawks at Los Angeles Raiders – Game summary

Quarter	1	2	3	4	Total
Seahawks	0	0	0	3	3
Raiders	6	7	7	0	20

at Los Angeles Memorial Coliseum, Los Angeles

- Date: November 15
- Game time: 1:01 pm local
- Game weather: clear, 78 °F (26 °C), 56% humidity, wind W 8 miles per hour (13 km/h)
- Game attendance: 46,862
- Referee: Dick Hantak
- TV announcers (NBC): Charlie Jones and Todd Christensen
- Gamebook

Game information

First quarter

- LA – Jeff Jaeger 47-yard field goal, 8:08 (LA 3–0)
- LA – Jeff Jaeger 43-yard field goal, 4:47 (LA 6–0)

Second quarter

- LA – Ethan Horton 5-yard pass from Jay Schroeder (Jeff Jaeger kick), 0:58 (LA 13–0)

Third quarter

- LA – Eric Dickerson 1-yard run (Jeff Jaeger kick), 9:11 (LA 20–0)

Fourth quarter

- SEA – John Kasay 43-yard field goal, 4:25 (LA 20–3)

Top passers

- SEA – Stan Gelbaugh: 6/12, 65 yds, 1 INT
- LA – Jay Schroeder: 10/23, 108 yds, 1 TD, 1 INT

Top rushers

- SEA – Chris Warren: 15 car, 63 yds
- LA – Nick Bell: 13 car, 35 yds

Top receivers

- SEA – John L. Williams: 5 rec, 33 yds
- LA – Steve Smith: 3 rec, 34 yds

Team – pass – rush – total – to

- SEA – 46 – 113 – 159 – 2
- LA – 88 – 100 – 188 – 1

==== Week 12: vs. Kansas City Chiefs ====
Week Twelve: Seattle Seahawks vs. Kansas City Chiefs – Game summary

Quarter	1	2	3	4	Total
Chiefs	10	7	7	0	24
Seahawks	0	7	7	0	14

at Kingdome, Seattle

- Date: November 22
- Game time: 5:06 pm local
- Game weather: indoors
- Game attendance: 49,867
- Referee: Howard Roe
- TV announcers (ESPN): Mike Patrick, Joe Theismann and Paul Maguire
- Gamebook

Game information

First quarter

- KC – Barry Word 44-yard run (Nick Lowery kick), 10:50 (KC 7–0)
- KC – Nick Lowery 20-yard field goal, 0:51 (KC 10–0)

Second quarter

- SEA – Tommy Kane 35-yard pass from Kelly Stouffer (John Kasay kick), 13:35 (KC 10–7)
- KC – Dale Carter 86-yard punt return (John Kasay kick), 3:37 (KC 17–7)

Third quarter

- KC – Neil Smith 22-yard interception return (Nick Lowery kick), 7:35 (KC 24–7)
- SEA – Chris Warren 6-yard run (John Kasay kick), 2:52 (KC 24–14)

Fourth quarter

- No scoring plays

Top passers

- KC – Dave Krieg: 11/15, 103 yds
- SEA – Kelly Stouffer: 13/30, 164 yds, 1 TD, 4 INT

Top rushers

- KC – Barry Word: 19 car, 85 yds, 1 TD
- SEA – Chris Warren: 20 car, 154 yds, 1 TD

Top receivers

- KC – Tim Barnett: 2 rec, 30 yds
- SEA – Tommy Kane: 5 rec, 65 yds, 1 TD

Team – pass – rush – total – to

- KC – 73 – 117 – 190 – 0
- SEA – 129 – 181 – 310 – 6

==== Week 13: vs. Denver Broncos ====
Week Thirteen: Seattle Seahawks vs. Denver Broncos – Game summary

Quarter	1	2	3	4	OT	Total
Broncos	10	0	3	0	0	13
Seahawks	0	3	0	10	3	16

at Kingdome, Seattle

- Date: November 30
- Game time: 6:06 pm local
- Game weather: indoors
- Game attendance: 51,612
- Referee: Gordon McCarter
- TV announcers (ABC): Al Michaels, Frank Gifford, and Dan Dierdorf
- Gamebook

Game information

First quarter

- DEN – Mark Jackson 6-yard pass from Tommy Maddox (David Treadwell kick), 10:41 (DEN 7–0)
- DEN – David Treadwell 28-yard field goal, 5:30 (DEN 10–0)

Second quarter

- SEA – John Kasay 30-yard field goal, 0:54 (DEN 10–3)

Third quarter

- DEN – David Treadwell 36-yard field goal, 5:26 (DEN 13–3)

Fourth quarter

- SEA – John Kasay 33-yard field goal, 5:20 (DEN 13–6)
- SEA – Brian Blades 3-yard pass from Stan Gelbaugh (John Kasay kick), 0:00 (Tied 13–13)

Overtime

- SEA – John Kasay 32-yard field goal, 3:50 (SEA 16–13)

Top passers

- DEN – Tommy Maddox: 11/26, 127 yds, 1 TD, 2 INT
- SEA – Stan Gelbaugh: 12/21, 164 yds, 1 TD

Top rushers

- DEN – Gaston Green: 20 car, 63 yds
- SEA – John L. Williams: 10 car, 40 yds

Top receivers

- DEN – Vance Johnson: 2 rec, 45 yds
- SEA – Tommy Kane: 5 rec, 79 yds

Team – pass – rush – total – to

- DEN – 112 – 84 – 196 – 2
- SEA – 234 – 74 – 308 – 4

==== Week 14: at Pittsburgh Steelers ====
Week Fourteen: Seattle Seahawks at Pittsburgh Steelers – Game summary

Quarter	1	2	3	4	Total
Seahawks	0	7	7	0	14
Steelers	7	3	0	10	20

at Three Rivers Stadium, Pittsburgh, Pennsylvania

- Date: December 6
- Game time: 1:01 pm local
- Game weather: cloudy, 26 °F (−3 °C), 60% humidity, wind SW 12 miles per hour (19 km/h)
- Game attendance: 47,015
- Referee: Larry Nemmers
- TV announcers (NBC): Jim Lampley & Ahmad Rashad
- Gamebook

Game information

First quarter

- PIT – Ernie Mills 19-yard pass from Neil O'Donnell (Gary Anderson kick), 1:09 (PIT 7–0)

Second quarter

- PIT – Gary Anderson 38-yard field goal, 14:14 (PIT 10–0)
- SEA – Tommy Kane 28-yard pass from Stan Gelbaugh (John Kasay kick), 8:49 (PIT 10–7)

Third quarter

- SEA – John L. Williams 3-yard pass from Stan Gelbaugh (John Kasay kick), 8:51 (SEA 14–10)

Fourth quarter

- PIT – Barry Foster 4-yard run (Gary Anderson kick), 2:22 (PIT 17–14)
- PIT – Gary Anderson 39-yard field goal, 0:58 (PIT 20–14)

Top passers

- SEA – Stan Gelbaugh: 13/28, 179 yds, 2 TD, 1 INT
- PIT – Neil O'Donnell: 10/17, 104 yds, 1 TD, 3 INT

Top rushers

- SEA – Chris Warren: 14 car, 43 yds
- PIT – Barry Foster: 33 car, 125 yds, 1 TD

Top receivers

- SEA – John L. Williams: 8 rec, 98 yds, 1 TD
- PIT – Dwight Stone: 3 rec, 44 yds

Team – pass – rush – total – to

- SEA – 153 – 67 – 220 – 2
- PIT – 168 – 138 – 306 – 5

==== Week 15: vs. Philadelphia Eagles ====
Week Fifteen: Seattle Seahawks vs. Philadelphia Eagles – Game summary

Quarter	1	2	3	4	OT	Total
Eagles	3	7	0	7	3	20
Seahawks	3	7	0	7	0	17

at Kingdome, Seattle

- Date: December 13
- Game time: 1:01 pm local
- Game weather: indoors
- Game attendance: 47,492
- Referee: Pat Haggerty
- TV announcers (CBS): James Brown & John Robinson
- Gamebook

Game information

First quarter

- SEA – John Kasay 39-yard field goal, 10:28 (SEA 3–0)
- PHI – Roger Ruzek 42-yard field goal, 6:00 (Tied 3–3)

Second quarter

- PHI – Randall Cunningham 4-yard run (Roger Ruzek kick), 12:42 (PHI 10–3)
- SEA – John L. Williams 11-yard pass from Stan Gelbaugh (John Kasay kick), 3:55 (Tied 10–10)

Third quarter

- No scoring plays

Fourth quarter

- SEA – Dwayne Harper 52-yard fumble return (John Kasay kick), 13:50 (SEA 17–10)
- PHI – Herschel Walker 8-yard run (Roger Ruzek kick), 4:52 (Tied 17–17)

Overtime

- PHI – Roger Ruzek 44-yard field goal, 0:03 (PHI 20–17)

Top passers

- PHI – Randall Cunningham: 27/44, 365 yds, 1 INT
- SEA – Stan Gelbaugh: 9/31, 66 yds, 1 TD, 2 INT

Top rushers

- PHI – Herschel Walker: 23 car, 111 yds, 1 TD
- SEA – Chris Warren: 19 car, 49 yds

Top receivers

- PHI – Fred Barnett: 9 rec, 161 yds
- SEA – Brian Blades: 4 rec, 36 yds

Team – pass – rush – total – to

- PHI – 276 – 190 – 466 – 2
- SEA – 24 – 63 – 87 – 2

==== Week 16: at Denver Broncos ====
Week Sixteen: Seattle Seahawks at Denver Broncos – Game summary

Quarter	1	2	3	4	Total
Seahawks	0	3	3	0	6
Broncos	0	0	7	3	10

at Mile High Stadium, Denver, Colorado

- Date: December 20
- Game time: 2:02 pm local
- Game weather: 13 °F (−11 °C), 67% humidity, wind 6 miles per hour (9.7 km/h)
- Game attendance: 72,570
- Referee: Tom White
- TV announcers (NBC): Jim Lampley & Dan Hampton
- Gamebook

Game information

First quarter

- No scoring plays

Second quarter

- SEA – John Kasay 34-yard field goal, 6:47 (SEA 3–0)

Third quarter

- DEN – Gaston Green 1-yard run (David Treadwell kick), 13:40 (DEN 7–3)
- SEA – John Kasay 36-yard field goal, 0:00 (DEN 7–6)

Fourth quarter

- DEN – David Treadwell 30-yard field goal, 11:55 (DEN 10–6)

Top passers

- SEA – Stan Gelbaugh: 13/24, 135 yds
- DEN – John Elway: 20/29, 210 yds, 3 INT

Top rushers

- SEA – Chris Warren: 16 car, 97 yds
- DEN – Gaston Green: 13 car, 50 yds, 1 TD

Top receivers

- SEA – Tommy Kane: 5 rec, 66 yds
- DEN – Cedric Tillman: 3 rec, 53 yds

Team – pass – rush – total – to

- SEA – 80 – 142 – 222 – 2
- DEN – 204 – 89 – 293 – 5

==== Week 17: vs. San Diego Chargers ====
Week Seventeen: Seattle Seahawks vs. San Diego Chargers – Game summary

Quarter	1	2	3	4	Total
Chargers	0	6	7	18	31
Seahawks	7	0	7	0	14

at Kingdome, Seattle

- Date: December 27
- Game time: 1:01 pm local
- Game weather: indoors
- Game attendance: 49,324
- Referee: Bernie Kukar
- TV announcers (NBC): Charlie Jones & Todd Christensen
- Gamebook

Game information

First quarter

- SEA – Chris Warren 30-yard run (John Kasay kick), 10:53 (SEA 7–0)

Second quarter

- SD – John Carney 31-yard field goal, 12:35 (SEA 7–3)
- SD – John Carney 38-yard field goal, 2:44 (SEA 7–6)

Third quarter

- SD – Marion Butts 7-yard run (John Carney kick), 8:56 (SD 13–7)
- SEA – Trey Junkin 2-yard pass from Stan Gelbaugh (John Kasay kick), 4:21 (SEA 14–13)

Fourth quarter

- SD – John Carney 47-yard field goal, 5:17 (SD 16–14)
- SD – Ronnie Harmon 5-yard run (John Carney kick), 3:06 (SD 23–14)
- SD – Safety, Burt Grossman tackled Stan Gelbaugh in end zone, 2:18 (SD 25–14)
- SD – Darren Carrington 28-yard interception return (PAT failed), 1:14 (SD 31–14)

Top passers

- SD – Stan Humphries: 8/14, 138 yds
- SEA – Stan Gelbaugh: 17/32, 222 yds, 1 TD, 2 INT

Top rushers

- SD – Marion Butts: 13 car, 64 yds, 1 TD
- SEA – Chris Warren: 5 car, 66 yds, 1 TD

Top receivers

- SD – Anthony Miller: 6 rec, 96 yds
- SEA – Brian Blades: 6 rec, 103 yds

Team – pass – rush – total – to

- SD – 243 – 98 – 341 – 0
- SEA – 202 – 156 – 358 – 2
