= Anthony Duclair =

Canadian ice hockey player (born 1995)

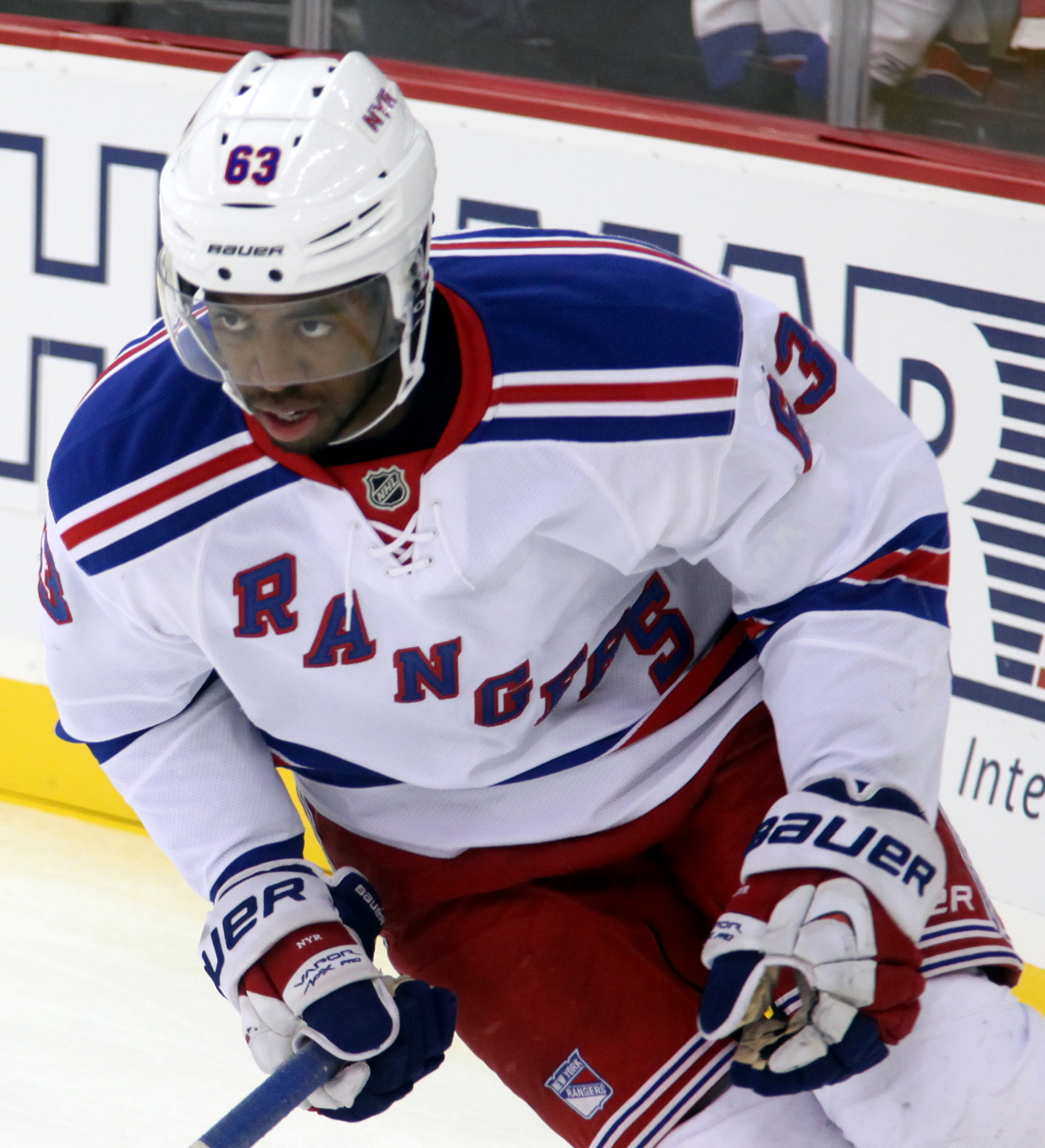
- Duclair with the New York Rangers in 2014
- Born: August 26, 1995 (age 31) Pointe-Claire, Quebec, Canada
- Height: 5 ft 11 in (180 cm)
- Weight: 197 lb (89 kg; 14 st 1 lb)
- Position: Forward
- Shoots: Left
- NHL team Former teams: New York Islanders; New York Rangers; Arizona Coyotes; Chicago Blackhawks; Columbus Blue Jackets; Ottawa Senators; Florida Panthers; San Jose Sharks; Tampa Bay Lightning
- NHL draft: 80th overall, 2013; New York Rangers
- Playing career: 2014–present

Anthony Duclair (born August 26, 1995) is a Haitian-Canadian professional ice hockey player who is a forward for the New York Islanders of the National Hockey League (NHL). Duclair was selected by the New York Rangers in the third round, 80th overall, of the 2013 NHL entry draft, the organization with which he began his NHL career. Duclair has also played in the NHL for the Arizona Coyotes, Chicago Blackhawks, Columbus Blue Jackets, Ottawa Senators, Florida Panthers, San Jose Sharks and Tampa Bay Lightning.

== Early years ==
Duclair was born on August 26, 1995, in Pointe-Claire, Quebec, and was raised in Laval by Haitian immigrants Wendell Duclair and Dominique Raphael. While both his father and uncle played Canadian football, with uncle Farell Duclair helping the Calgary Stampeders win the 86th Grey Cup in 1998, Anthony instead played ice hockey. A fan of the Montreal Canadiens of the National Hockey League (NHL), Duclair's favorite childhood hockey player was Saku Koivu.

Duclair began ice skating at the age of two and playing hockey two years later. As a child, Duclair attended schools where he would be finished with class early in the afternoon, allowing him to spend more time practicing hockey. In 2008, he and Frédérik Gauthier appeared in the Quebec International Pee-Wee Hockey Tournament with a minor ice hockey affiliate of the Canadiens. As an adolescent, he played with the Lac St. Louis Lions of the Quebec Midget AAA Hockey League. In 2011, the Lions won the Jimmy Ferrari Cup, and Duclair was awarded the Mario Lemieux Trophy for the top 15-year-old prospect in the league. The Lions then advanced to the Telus Cup, where Duclair scored two goals in their bronze medal match win over the Vancouver North West Giants.

== Playing career ==
=== Junior ===
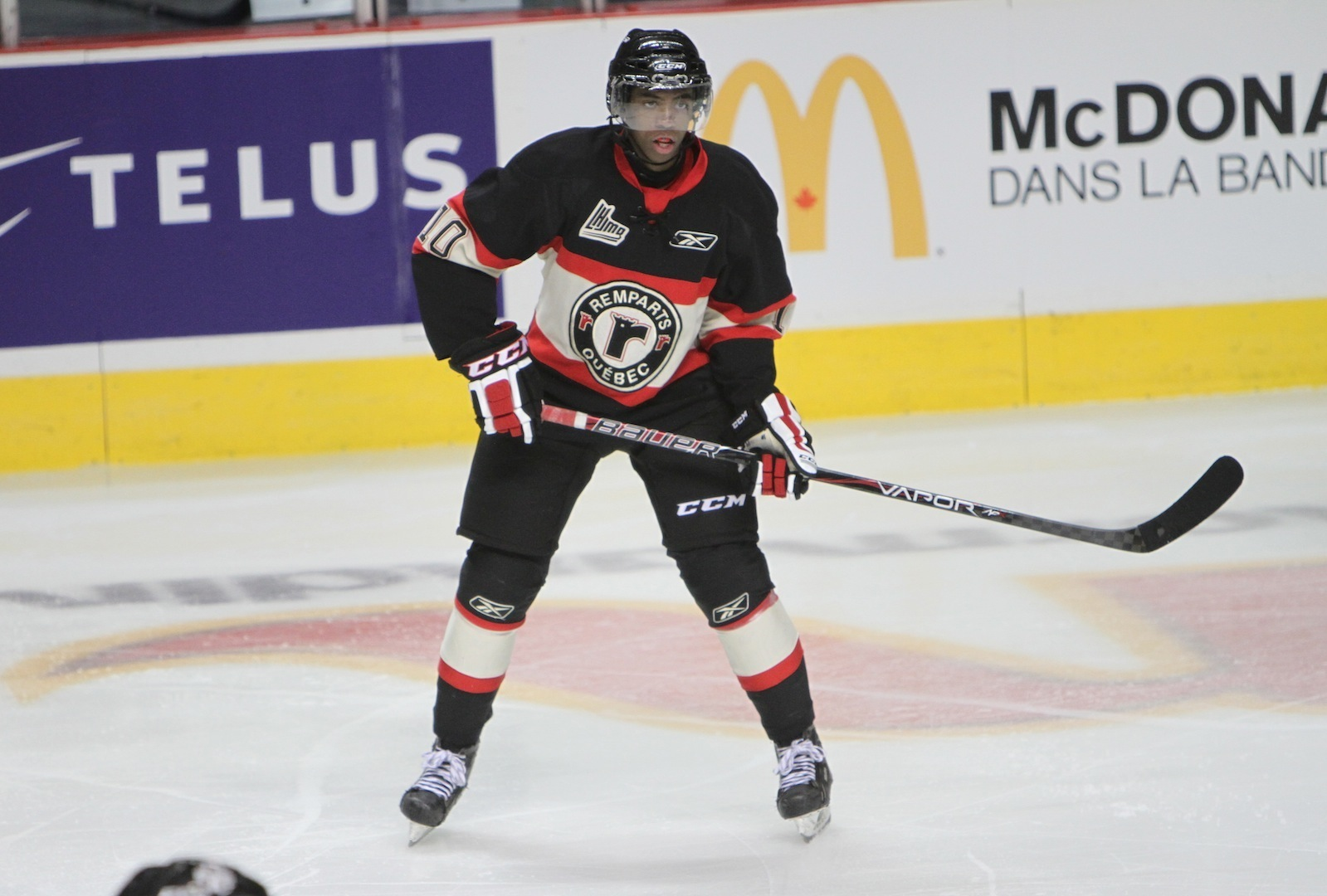
Duclair with the Quebec Remparts in 2011.

Duclair spent three seasons with the Quebec Remparts of the Quebec Major Junior Hockey League (QMJHL). He scored an impressive 50 goals in 59 games during the 2013–14 season. Duclair was rewarded for his outstanding play being named to the QMJHL First All-Star Team.

=== Professional ===
==== New York Rangers ====
Duclair signed an entry-level contract with the New York Rangers on January 2, 2014. Because he waited until the beginning of 2014 to sign, under the NHL collective bargaining agreement, Duclair was exempt from a usual clause with rookie players in which they can be returned to their junior teams within the first 10 games of an NHL season without triggering the first year of their contract. He impressed head coach Alain Vigneault during the Rangers' 2014 training camp, but was not able to appear on their opening night roster until the team was under their 50-contract limit. General manager Glen Sather traded defenseman Steven Kampfer and forward Andrew Yogan to the Florida Panthers in exchange for Joey Crabb in order to accommodate a roster position for Duclair. He made his NHL debut on October 9, 2014, playing on a line with J. T. Miller and Lee Stempniak for a 3–2 Rangers victory over the St. Louis Blues. He recorded five points in his first seven NHL games, culminating in his first goal on October 27. The Rangers began the third period of that game down 3–0 to the Minnesota Wild, but Duclair scored the game-tying goal against Darcy Kuemper with just under four minutes left to play; 37 seconds later, Mats Zuccarello put the Rangers ahead 5–4 to win.

Duclair struggled to maintain his scoring output after his first goal: after recording one goal and five assists in his first nine games, he added only one more assist through the next nine. Although Vigneault and the Rangers were initially hesitant to send Duclair back to the Remparts, as he would have to remain there until the conclusion of their 2014–15 season, he was too young to play in the American Hockey League (AHL) and was returned to his junior team on January 5, 2015. After being returned to the Remparts, Duclair recorded 34 points in 26 QMJHL games, including seven points in his last four games before the 2015 playoffs. He added another 26 points in 22 playoff games before the Remparts were defeated by the Rimouski Océanic in Game 7 of the President's Cup series.

==== Arizona Coyotes ====
On March 1, 2015, while playing with the Remparts, Duclair was traded to the Arizona Coyotes (along with John Moore and two draft picks) in exchange for Keith Yandle and Chris Summers.

Arizona Coyotes general manager Don Maloney confirmed fan speculation by stating that he acquired Duclair from the New York Rangers in the hopes that he would develop line chemistry with a rookie Arizona already possessed, Max Domi. This was due to the fact that during the 2015 World Junior Ice Hockey Championship, Duclair and Domi both showed visible chemistry and were key components in leading Canada to gold.

On October 14, 2015, Duclair scored his first career NHL hat-trick in a 4–0 shutout win against the Anaheim Ducks. Fellow rookie Max Domi pitched in a goal of his own and an assist on one of Duclair's goals. In Duclair's first full season in the NHL, he developed instant line chemistry with Domi, earning the duo the nickname "The Killer D's".

On January 19, 2017, Duclair was demoted to the team's AHL affiliate, the Tucson Roadrunners, due to a lack of production. On March 3, 2017, he returned to the Coyotes.

On January 4, 2018, it was reported that Duclair had requested to be traded from the Coyotes.

==== Chicago Blackhawks ====
On January 10, 2018, Duclair was traded (alongside defenceman Adam Clendening) to the Chicago Blackhawks in exchange for forwards Richard Pánik and Laurent Dauphin. His inconsistency carried over to the Blackhawks, after making an initial impact he finished the season scoreless in his last 14 games and finished the season appearing in 23 games for 8 points for Chicago.

On June 25, 2018, as a restricted free agent, Duclair was not tendered a qualifying offer by the Blackhawks and was released to explore free agency.

==== Columbus Blue Jackets ====
On July 5, 2018, Duclair signed a one-year, one-way contract worth $650,000 with the Columbus Blue Jackets. In 53 games for the team, Duclair recorded 11 goals and 19 points.

==== Ottawa Senators ====
On February 23, 2019, Duclair was traded to the Ottawa Senators (along with second-round picks in 2020 and 2021) in exchange for Ryan Dzingel and a seventh-round pick in 2019. Only a few days before the trade, Blue Jackets head coach John Tortorella publicly criticized Duclair, saying that Duclair "doesn't know how to play".

On June 17, 2019, Duclair signed a one-year contract with the Senators for the 2019–20 season worth $1.65 million. He immediately became one of Ottawa's top offensive players, recording 21 goals and 30 points in his first 38 games, leading the team in both categories. He was subsequently named as the Senators' representative for the 2020 NHL All-Star Game held on January 25, 2020, in St. Louis.

On June 8, 2020, Duclair became an inaugural executive board member of the Hockey Diversity Alliance, whose goal is to address intolerance and racism in hockey.

In October 2020, Duclair fired his agent and took over contract negotiations with the Senators by himself, against the advice of GM Pierre Dorion. The two sides could not come to an agreement and the Senators declined to offer him a qualifying offer on a new contract, making him a free agent.

==== Florida Panthers ====
On December 17, 2020, Duclair signed as a free agent to a one-year, $1.7 million contract with Florida Panthers.

On July 15, 2021, Duclair signed a three-year, $9 million contract extension with the Panthers. With four goals and seven assists in the 2023 Stanley Cup playoffs, Duclair would help the Panthers reach their first Stanley Cup Finals in 27 years.

==== San Jose Sharks ====
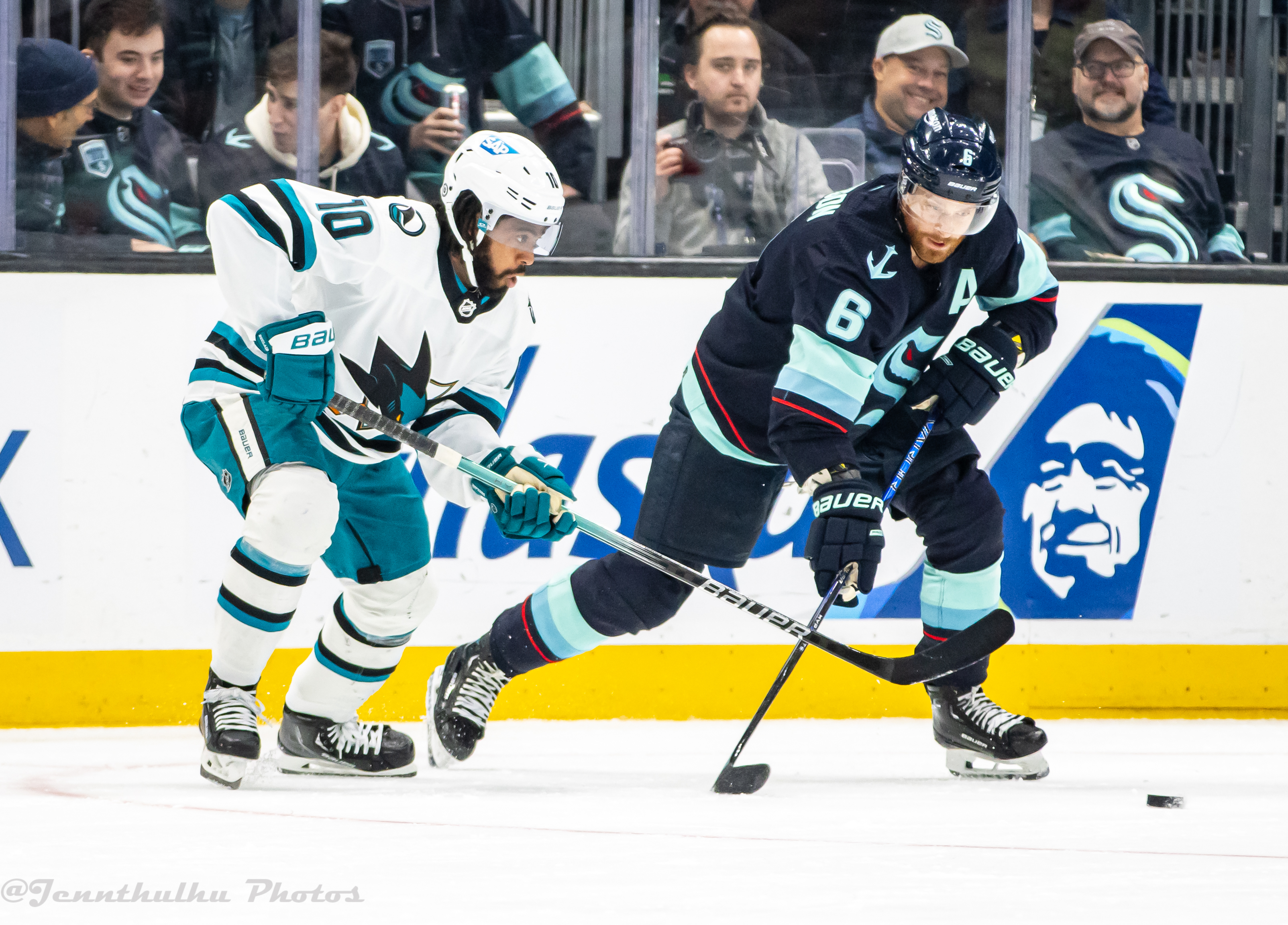
Duclair (left) and Adam Larsson of the Seattle Kraken in 2023.

On July 1, 2023, due to salary cap considerations, Duclair was traded by the Panthers to the San Jose Sharks in exchange for Steven Lorentz and a fifth-round selection in 2025.

==== Tampa Bay Lightning ====
On March 7, 2024, Duclair was traded to the Tampa Bay Lightning in exchange for Jack Thompson and a 2024 third-round draft pick. Duclair scored the Lightning's fifth goal of the evening and his first goal as a Bolt in his debut game on the team on March 9 against the Flyers. The Lightning would go on to the Stanley Cup playoffs losing in the first round to Duclair's former team, Florida Panthers.

==== New York Islanders ====
On July 1, 2024, Duclair signed a four-year, $14 million contract with the New York Islanders.

On January 6, 2026, Duclair scored a hat trick against the New Jersey Devils in a 9–0 Islanders win. It was Duclair's first hat trick since 2019 with the Senators.

== Career statistics ==
=== Regular season and playoffs ===
			Regular season					Playoffs
Season	Team	League	GP	G	A	Pts	PIM	GP	G	A	Pts	PIM
2010–11	Lac St-Louis Lions	QMAAA	34	25	32	57	36	14	9	14	23	20
2011–12	Quebec Remparts	QMJHL	63	31	35	66	50	11	3	5	8	8
2012–13	Quebec Remparts	QMJHL	55	20	30	50	22	11	3	5	8	12
2013–14	Quebec Remparts	QMJHL	59	50	49	99	56	—	—	—	—	—
2014–15	Quebec Remparts	QMJHL	26	15	19	34	24	22	8	18	26	18
2014–15	New York Rangers	NHL	18	1	6	7	4	—	—	—	—	—
2015–16	Arizona Coyotes	NHL	81	20	24	44	49	—	—	—	—	—
2016–17	Arizona Coyotes	NHL	58	5	10	15	14	—	—	—	—	—
2016–17	Tucson Roadrunners	AHL	16	1	7	8	4	—	—	—	—	—
2017–18	Arizona Coyotes	NHL	33	9	6	15	10	—	—	—	—	—
2017–18	Chicago Blackhawks	NHL	23	2	6	8	6	—	—	—	—	—
2018–19	Columbus Blue Jackets	NHL	53	11	8	19	12	—	—	—	—	—
2018–19	Ottawa Senators	NHL	21	8	6	14	2	—	—	—	—	—
2019–20	Ottawa Senators	NHL	66	23	17	40	18	—	—	—	—	—
2020–21	Florida Panthers	NHL	43	10	22	32	18	6	0	0	0	6
2021–22	Florida Panthers	NHL	74	31	27	58	30	8	1	2	3	4
2022–23	Florida Panthers	NHL	20	2	7	9	2	20	4	7	11	16
2023–24	San Jose Sharks	NHL	56	16	11	27	28	—	—	—	—	—
2023–24	Tampa Bay Lightning	NHL	17	8	7	15	6	5	0	2	2	0
2024–25	New York Islanders	NHL	44	7	4	11	10	—	—	—	—	—
2025–26	New York Islanders	NHL	62	12	15	27	12	—	—	—	—	—
NHL totals			669	165	176	341	221	39	5	11	16	26

Medal record

Representing Canada

Ice hockey

Ivan Hlinka Memorial Tournament
Gold medal – first place	2012 Piešťany	

IIHF World U20 Championship
Gold medal – first place	2015 Toronto	

=== International ===
Year	Team	Event	Result	GP	G	A	Pts	PIM
2011	Canada Quebec	U17	4th	6	0	4	4	4
2012	Canada Quebec	U17	6th	4	0	1	1	8
2012	Canada	IH18	1st place, gold medalist(s)	5	1	1	2	8
2015	Canada	WJC	1st place, gold medalist(s)	7	4	4	8	16
Junior totals				22	5	10	15	36

== Awards and honours ==
Award	Year	Ref
QMJHL
QMJHL First Team All-Star	2013–14	
NHL
All-Star Game	2020	
