= Bev Facey Community High School =

Location
- 99 Colwill Boulevard; Sherwood Park, Alberta, T8A 4V5; Canada; 53°31′31.00″N 113°16′8.38″W

Information
- School type: Public Senior High School
- Motto: In Pursuit of Excellence
- Founded: 1981
- School board: Elk Island Public Schools
- Principal: Ken Wlos
- Teaching staff: 66
- Grades: 10–12
- Enrolment: 1,113 (2015)
- Language: English
- Campus: Suburban
- Colours: Blue and gold
- Mascot: Chuck the Falcon
- Team name: Falcons
- Budget: $8.529 million
- Website: www.bevfacey.ca

Bev Facey Community High School, known as Bev Facey, is a public high school for grades 10–12 in Sherwood Park, Strathcona County, Alberta, which falls under the jurisdiction of the Elk Island Public Schools Regional Division No. 14.

== History ==
Bev Facey Community High School was opened in 1981 by the County of Strathcona No. 20 (now Strathcona County), which was responsible for school provision between 1962 and 1994. In 1994 the Strathcona County schools were split off to form Elk Island Public Schools Regional Division No. 14, commonly known as Elk Island Public Schools.

Bev Facey is a two-storey building of 17,282.5 square metres (186,027 sq ft) and has a capacity of 1,481 students. It is the largest high school in Elk Island Public Schools, and has an optimum enrollment of 1,200 students. Only minor renovations have been done since the building was constructed: several classrooms were combined to create the Student Services area in 1993; the metal working, wood working, and graphics areas were converted to classrooms and the communications technology area in 1999; a Health and Wellness Centre was completed in 2015; and the cosmetology lab and administration areas were modernized in 2016.

The school was named for Mr. F. B. (Bev) Facey, the Strathcona County Superintendent of Schools from 1962 to 1975. He was the last superintendent in the Clover Bar School Division and the first in the County. He retired in 1974.

== Facilities ==
Bev Facey has multiple labs, class specific classrooms, and special services, dedicated for academic enhancement and achievement. Bev Facey has the following:

- four computer labs equipped with RTX 4070's for the esports teams
- a competition gym and a practice gym with change rooms equipped with lockers and shower facilities
- a Wellness Centre with weights and fitness equipment
- a greenhouse for horticulture electives
- a fine-arts theater with dressing rooms
- a 45-seat music room (tiered seating)
- a recording studio
- a 65-seat drama room (tiered seating)
- The cafeteria is open only at lunchtime. It serves dishes prepared by the Culinary Arts students, and is staffed by students obtaining work experience.
- The Falcon's Nest Café is open before and after school, and during breaks and lunch. It is staffed by students.
- The library holds magazines and books, and 40 computers with internet connectivity. It also has several laptop carts for classroom use.
- The student-services department offers career planning, test-anxiety management, tutoring, and applications for school awards.

Bev Facey backs onto the Strathcona Athletic Park, which is used for physical-education classes and athletic-team practices. Strathcona Athletic Park has four baseball diamonds, a football field, five combination football/soccer fields. a running track, and a practice soccer field. In winter there is an outdoor hockey rink.

== Academics ==
Bev Facey is accredited as Alberta school number 3340 by Alberta Education. In 2015 the school had a three-year high school completion rate of 85.7%, a four-year completion rate of 86.9%, and a five-year completion rate of 91.1%, exceeding the average completion rates for Elk Island Public Schools and the province. The annual dropout rate was 1.8%, less than the average dropout rates for Elk Island Public Schools and the province.

Courses are offered to the 30 level in English, mathematics, social studies, sciences (general, biology, chemistry, and physics), physical education, and second languages (French and Spanish). Fine arts courses are offered to the 30 level in art, band (both concert and jazz), creative music (rock/pop and singer-songwriter), drama, musical theater, and technical theater. Specialized programs include:

=== Advanced placement ===
Bev Facey offers the following 13 (of thirty-eight) academic courses in the Advanced Placement (AP) Program:

- Art & Design
- Biology
- Calculus AB
- Chemistry
- Computing Science Principles
- Computer Science A
- English Language and Composition
- English Literature
- French Language and Culture
- Music Theory
- Physics 1
- Physics 2
- Statistics

=== Career education ===
Career and technology studies (CTS) is a flexible provincial curriculum of one-credit units designed to develop skills that students can apply in the workplace or in further learning. Bev Facey combines units to offer courses in the following CTS areas:

- Business Studies
  - Financial Management
  - Management and Marketing
  - Legal Studies
- Career and Life Management (CALM)
  - Unlike other CTS units, CALM is a three-credit course and is a graduation requirement (with very limited exceptions) for all Alberta high school students. It is a single course, which may be taken in any year of high school. It is sometimes offered as a combined course with physical education.
- Computer Technology and Digital Technology
  - Audio Engineering
  - Computer Works
  - Digital Media and Design
  - Facey Productions
  - Photography
- Cosmetology
- Food Courses
  - Culinary Arts
  - Food Studies
- Horticulture
  - Floral Design
  - Horticulture
- Lifestyle/wellness
  - Athletic Leadership
  - Health and Wellness
  - Personal Fitness
- Trades and Technical
  - Construction Technology (Woodshop)
  - Fabrication Studies (Welding)
  - Mechanics

=== Off campus education ===
Bev Facey offers four off-campus programs:

- Career internships
- The Green Certificate Program administered by Alberta Agriculture, Food and Rural Development.
- The Registered Apprentice Program (RAP) where students combine school work with paid off-campus apprenticeship work towards a trade ticket.
- Work Experience

=== Special education ===
Alberta Education requires that all public school boards provide educational programming for students with special education needs. Elk Island Public Schools offers the following three special education programs at Bev Facey:

- The FOCUS program provides support for students with complex academic, behavioral and emotional needs. Core subject areas and optional courses are available in FOCUS.
- The Generating Occupational, Academic and Life Skills (GOALS) program is a special education program for students with mild cognitive disabilities. Life skills, social skills, and basic academic skills are covered in GOALS.
- The Practical Learning and Community Education (PLACE) program is a special education program for students with moderate cognitive disabilities and significant delays in all areas of development. Self-care, social and vocational skills, and basic literacy and numeracy are covered in PLACE.

== Cisco Networking Academy ==
Bev Facey is a Cisco Networking Academy, and is certified as a Pearson VUE Testing Center so that students may take their CompTIA A+, CompTIA Network+, or Cisco Certified Network Associate–Routing and Switching Essentials certification exams at the school.

The school was one of twelve schools worldwide (and the only non-university) to participate with Cisco Networking Academy in the 2015 pilot of the Internet of Everything course.

== Athletics ==
Bev Facey's sports teams are known as the Falcons, and their mascot is Chuck the Falcon, a blue falcon. The school competes in the 51-school Metro Edmonton High School Athletics (Metro Athletics) region of the Alberta Schools' Athletic Association (ASAA), and enters teams in the following sports:

- Badminton
- Basketball (boys' and girls' teams) (Note: There are junior teams for both boys and girls in basketball and volleyball, and a junior boys' team in football.)
- Cross country running
- Curling
- Football (Note: In 2016 Bev Facey was one of approximately six high schools in the Metro Athletics region with a coed football team.)
- Golf (boys' and girls' teams)
- Team handball (boys' and girls' teams)
- Rugby (boys' and girls' teams)
- Soccer (Note: Championships for soccer and swimming are at the Metro Athletics regional level since these sports are not sanctioned by the ASAA.)
- Swimming
- Track and Field
- Volleyball (boys' and girls' teams)
- Wrestling
- Esports

=== ASAA provincial championships ===
- senior football team Tier 1: 2002–03
- senior girls' handball team Tier 1: 2014–15 and 2015–16
- senior boys' handball team Tier 1: 1997-98, 1998–99, 2015–16
- senior girls' rugby team Tier 1: 2015–16

=== Metro Athletics championships (non-ASAA sports) ===
- senior girls' soccer team: 1993–94, 2002–03, 2003–04, and 2005–06
- junior girls' soccer team: 2009–10, 2010–11, and 2012–13

Prior to 2013, Metro Athletics did not include Edmonton Public Schools, the largest Edmonton area school board.

== 2016 online threat ==
Bev Facey was one of seven Edmonton area schools that were the target of a rash of online threats in late 2016, resulting in school lockdowns or the less-severe "hold and secure" threat response, police investigations, and arrests. Similar incidents occurred at Fort McMurray and Red Deer, Alberta schools in the same time period.

In the Bev Facey incident once the threat was reported the school was placed in a hold and secure alert until the RCMP arrived at the school and arrested the student allegedly responsible.

== Notable alumni ==
- David Beard, offensive lineman for the Edmonton Elks of the Canadian Football League (CFL)
- Sara Canning, actress
- Chuba Hubbard (2017), running back for the Carolina Panthers of the NFL
- Matt Jeneroux, Member of Parliament, former MLA
- Neil King, CFL safety
- Ryan King (2004), former CFL long snapper
- Cory Stevens (1986), retired kicker with the CFL Saskatchewan Roughriders, assistant coach with the Bev Facey football team as of 2016
- Cam Ward (2002) former goaltender for the Carolina Hurricanes and Chicago Blackhawks of the NHL
