= North Battleford Comprehensive High School =

Location
- 1791 110th Street; North Battleford, Saskatchewan, S9A 2Y2; Canada; 52.7816°N 108.2813°W

Information
- School type: Public Secondary School
- Motto: "From Possibility to Actuality"
- Established: 1970
- School board: Living Sky School Division
- Staff: 54
- Grades: 7–12
- Enrollment: 1,193 (2022)
- Mascot: Viking Warrior
- Website: nbchs.lskysd.ca

North Battleford Comprehensive High School (NBCHS) is one of three high schools in the city of North Battleford, Saskatchewan, Canada. NBCHS has a student body of around 1300 students, and a faculty of approximately 60 teachers.

== History ==
Construction of the school was completed in 1970, and was originally opened as North Battleford Collegiate Institute. In 1974 the school took the name NBCHS. In 1997 the school's building was divided, and the North West Regional College was incorporated into the building. In January 1988 the school became one of four in the province to offer the International Baccalaureate Programme. As of August 27, 2007 North Battleford Comprehensive became a smoke-free zone.

== Notable staff ==
- Gordon Barnhart – (History) – former Lieutenant Governor of Saskatchewan

== Notable alumni ==
- Wade Belak - professional hockey player for the Nashville Predators
- Rueben Mayes - retired professional American football player
- W. Brett Wilson - Canadian entrepreneur and philanthropist
- Bruce Woloshyn - digital effects artist and supervisor with Method Studios

== Student Representative Council ==
The SRC at NBCHS strives to make the school year more enjoyable for both students and staff. Meeting once a week, the SRC consists of representatives from each grade, a treasurer, secretary, and the Senior Ring and Pin of the school. While the grade representatives apply to be on the SRC, the other positions are elected by the student body.

== School sports ==
The school has teams for Golf, Football, Volleyball, Curling, Track and Field, Wrestling, Badminton, and Cross Country Running Teams. Each team is successful in their respective category, and has won at least one provincial title at some point in time. The school's senior boys' basketball team has won the 4A provincial title two consecutive seasons (2008–2009 to 2009–2010).

The senior boys volleyball team placed second at the Volleyball Provincials in 2011. The junior football team won the KFL championship 2014 team. The Senior Vikings Football team recently won the 3A provincial football championship in 2017.

== School clubs ==
The North Battleford Comprehensive High School offers a variety of clubs, providing students with a multitude of opportunities to participate in extracurricular activities. These clubs include the pottery club, the book club, radio club, drama club, and the film club. The school also places a mock trial team in competition for the McKercher Cup, sponsored by the Canadian Bar Association.

Vice Principal Daryl Wing headed the now-gone 'Rockstar Club' with his band Highway 4 North who had, over the course of the 2010-2011 scholastic year, learnt 3 songs, all of them covers. Their most popular cover song was 'Shine' by Collective Soul. It had become an unofficial anthem for the school, being heard at almost every school event throughout the year.

The Encounters with Canada allows students aged 14–17 to travel to Ottawa to gather knowledge about Canada's history and meet accomplished Canadians who will give them knowledge for their future endeavours.
