= Geoff Amoore =

Australian rules footballer

Personal information
- Full name: Geoff Amoore
- Born: 3 May 1964 (age 62)
- Original team: Karingal (NFL)
- Height: 188 cm (6 ft 2 in)
- Weight: 75 kg (165 lb)

Playing career^{1}
Years	Club	Games (Goals)
1983–1984	St Kilda	5 (2)
- ^{1} Playing statistics correct to the end of 1984.

Geoffrey Lance Amoore (born 3 May 1964) is a former Australian rules footballer who represented the St Kilda Football Club in the Victorian Football League (VFL) during the 1980s.

Originally from Nepean Football League (NFL) club Karingal, Amoore spent two seasons with the Saints, in which he played in just 5 games, and did not play in a single win in his short VFL career. He later played in the Victorian Football Association (VFA) with Frankston. His nickname was Chas.
