= John E. Amoore =

British biochemist (1930–1998)

John Earnest Amoore
- Born: 28 April 1930; Matlock, Derbyshire
- Died: 1998 (aged 67–68)
- Education: Oxford University (B.Sc., 1952) (D.Phil., 1958)
- Known for: Stereochemical theory for olfaction
- Scientific career
- Fields: Biochemistry
- Workplaces: Western Regional Research Laboratories (1963–1978); Olfacto Lab (1978–1998)

John E. Amoore (1930–1998) was a British biochemist who first proposed the stereochemical theory for olfaction.

== Bibliography ==
- Molecular Basis of Odor John E. Amoore, Published 1970, Thomas ISBN 0-398-00039-5
- How Smells Shape Up John E. Amoore, Published 1977, American Chemical Society
