= Lesa Mayes-Stringer =

Canadian bobsledder (born 1968)

Lesa Mayes-Stringer (born 13 May 1968 in North Battleford, Saskatchewan) is a former bobsled athlete who competed for Canada from 1999 to 2007.

== Athletic career ==
Canadian Jr. Silver medallist in the Heptathlon

Canadian Silver medallist Canadian Senior Track and Field Championships in the Heptathlon

York University Track team. CIAU National Gold medallist, 60 meter hurdles; Gold medallist 4X400m; Gold medallist, 4X100m; Bronze medallist shot put

Simon Fraser University Track and Field Team. Gold medallist shot put, Gold medallist 4X100m

Canadian Champion Women's 2 man Bobsleigh 2003/2005 pilot

First Black Women's Canadian Bobsleigh Pilot Gold Medallist

First North American Black Women to compete on the World Cup Circuit as a pilot.

Canadian Champion Women's 2man Bobsleigh 2004/2005 pilot.

During her time as an athlete Lesa volunteered as a speaker with the YES Program (Youth Education for Sport) speaking to thousands of children throughout Canada. She also represented the 350 Canadian High Performance athletes from 2000 to 2007 on the executive board for the Canadian Sport Institute located in Calgary, Alberta. She advocated for athletes rights and even met with the Minister of Health and helped to get mandatory heath coverage put in place for all National Team athletes.

In 2007, Lesa Mayes-Stringer and her family moved to France. She was asked to rebuild the National Bobsleigh program for Team France with assistance from the head coach of the national team of Monaco.

== Education ==
Lesa earned a degree in history from York University on an academic scholarship and completed the PDP program at Simon Fraser University in British Columbia where she received her teaching certification.

== Teaching Career and Christian Ministry ==
Lesa worked as a High School teacher in Calgary, Alberta. During this time she started the PLP program for High School social studies for the Calgary Board of Education. She used the theory of multiple intelligences as a basis for using diversified teaching techniques to better meet individual student needs. The program began as a pilot program with approximately 24 students and later ballooned to include thousands of students.

Lesa Mayes-Stringer started an English training school in France called Lovin'English.

Lesa now lives in Edmonton, Alberta Canada where she works alongside her husband in full time Christian ministry as the Women's Ministry Leader for the Capital City Church of Christ.

She is also involved in helping to bring about changes in Bobsleigh for Canada.

Work as an Artist

Family and Heritage

Lesa is a direct descendent of a group who fled racial persecution in Oklahoma in 1910 and traveled north to Saskatchewan, Canada after reading flyers which promised 160 acres of free land to anyone willing to move there. This group of pioneers were known as the "Shiloh People", named after the "Shiloh Baptist Church", a small log cabin church they built after they arrived.

Lesa Mayes-Stringer married Christopher Stringer in Richmond, British Columbia in 1994. They have three adult children, Meigan, Madison and Adam.

She is the younger sister of former professional football player Rueben Mayes.

Lesa's daughter Madison competes with the French National Women's Bobsleigh Team. In 2021, Madison won the Under 23 Jr World Championships with her pilot Margot Boch.
