= South Kamloops Secondary School =

Location
- 821 Munro St; Kamloops, British Columbia, V2C 3E9; Canada; 50.66627°N 120.32048°W

Information
- School type: Public, high school
- Motto: Dedication - Wisdom - Integrity
- Founded: 1952 (present campus), 1904 (Kamloops High School), 2003 (present name)
- School board: School District 73 Kamloops/Thompson
- School district: School District 73
- Superintendent: Mike McKay
- School number: 4327012
- Principal: Chris Preymak
- Staff: 85
- Grades: 8-12
- Enrollment: c. 1,120 (2025-2026)
- Language: English/French
- Classrooms: 44
- Area: 9,010m²
- Colours: Gold, White and Black
- Athletics: Basketball, Volleyball, Football, Golf, Ultimate Frisbee, Badminton, Soccer, Aquatics, Field Hockey, Cross Country, Curling, Wrestling, Skiing/Snowboarding, Track & Field, Mountain Biking
- Mascot: Titan
- Feeder schools: Aberdeen Elementary, Beattie Elementary, Dufferin Elementary, Ecole Collines D'Or, Lloyd George Elementary, Savana Elementary, Skeetchestn Community School, Sk'elep School of Excellence, South Sa-Hali Elementary
- Website: www.sd73.bc.ca/skss
- Last updated: May 2026

South Kamloops Secondary School is a public high school in Kamloops, British Columbia, Canada. It was formed in 1904 under the name Kamloops High School, and moved to its current campus in 1952. It was renamed in 2003 to its current name following a merger with the nearby John Peterson Junior Secondary School.

With approximately 1,000 students and 85 staff, SKSS is one of the largest secondary schools in British Columbia's School District 73 Kamloops/Thompson.

The school has fine arts programs in photography, visual arts, band and drama. The drama program has performed four different plays since the birth of the school; Dracula, Into the Woods, Kurt Vonnegut Jr.'s Welcome to the Monkey House, and Bye-Bye Birdie. The jazz band went to the 52nd MusicFest Canada Nationals in Toronto and won Gold standings in 2024, led by Music Director Michelle McRae.

SKSS's inaugural principal Vic Bifano was honoured with recognition as one of Canada's Best Principals and induction into the Canadian National Academy of Principals.

== History ==
Since its inception, SKSS has undergone many name changes, and, as of present, has held 7 different titles. Prior to the school's operation at the present Munro Street campus, facilities were located at various locations within Kamloops, including facilities at the corner of First Avenue and Victoria Street, classes in the third floor of the building now named Stuart Wood School, the Seymour Street Methodist Church and longtime quarters on the corner of St. Paul Street and Sixth Avenue.

In 1879, St. Louis' College, a religious boarding school for girls, was built in a location in the present-day Mission Flats. These facilities served as the first permanent school in the area. Foresight, analysis, and predictions proving incorrect later resulted in the demise of this location, as the city began to expand eastward, towards present-day Valleyview, instead of proliferating west, as was expected. This made the religious campus, which was located in the far-west, then-undeveloped suburbs of the town, somewhat impractical when it came to transport and access. As a result, in 1887, St. Louis' College was floated upstream, towards downtown Kamloops, on three huge barges. The building was moved to a location just west of the town, near present-day Fourth Avenue. In 1910, however, the school became overcrowded, and it was demolished. A new building was constructed on the south side of Columbia Street, where it still stands and operates as St. Ann's Academy.

Although this was technically the first school in Kamloops, the preliminary public school in the area would not come until 1886, when Kamloops School was completed in a location on First Avenue between St. Paul Street and Seymour Street, in the present location of the Old Courthouse (which was not built until 1903). In 1893, with an enrollment of 140 pupils, Kamloops School moved to new quarters on St. Paul Street and Third Avenue, on the same plot of land of the present Stuart Wood School.

Although prior to 1904, there had been privately funded secondary schools within the town, the first public installment came in the form of Kamloops High School, which, in 1904, commenced operations in the upper floor of a livery stable on First Avenue and Victoria Street. In 1907, KHS outgrew this school and moved into the upper floor of the Kamloops School at St. Paul and Third.

In 1910, with the combined enrollment of the elementary and secondary population at Kamloops school being 403, high school facilities were temporarily relocated to the Kamloops Methodist Church on Third Avenue and Seymour Street. In 1912, Kamloops High School was opened in a dedicated campus at Sixth Avenue and St. Paul Street, at the present location of the Kamloops RCMP detachment.

Kam High remained at this location, with various expansions and alterations to the facilities, until 1952. By this time, the location was becoming antiquated, and the facilities were feeling the squeeze of overcrowding. In 1947, the School Board had proposed a referendum for a very extravagant school, which would boast a huge, 700-person capacity auditorium, full-size gymnasium (the first in Kamloops), and a residential dormitory which would house boarding students from far away. In 1948, after public voting, the proposal failed to pass.

In 1950, a new proposal was prepared which put less emphasis on the more lavish features of the building, and focused more on dedicated facilities for proper education, which were designed to last much longer than those built at the previous campus. This time, the referendum passed, and construction began in 1951 on the new school, located between Eighth and Ninth Avenue on Munro Street. Initially, residents of Kamloops thought the location was much too far out of town; practicality was severely doubted. Despite this, the school successfully opened for the 1952–53 school year, and, at the time, had an enrollment of over 1,000 students. The dormitory present in the original proposal was ultimately built, and residential students from neighbouring districts without a dedicated secondary school stayed here. In 1953, the auditorium (in a much lesser capacity than originally proposed) was opened at the present location of the Sagebrush Theatre. Accusations from critics began to subside as the fantastic features of the school were gradually recognized. Featuring a dedicated "trades wing" including metalworking, woodworking, and auto (car) shop programs, a junior and senior drama program, fine arts classes, and extensive academic facilities including two two-story main wings, Kamloops' first regulation-sized gymnasium, and a massive auditorium which had a seating capacity larger than that of the Capitol Theatre downtown and could accommodate many theatre programs, and much more.

Then-school band director Archie McMurdo led a group of 52 band students on a trip to Holland in the summer of 1954 to take part in the World Music festival, the only school from North America to receive the honours of being invited to compete that year.

Overcrowding pressure was alleviated in 1956, with the construction of North Kamloops Junior Senior Secondary School which allowed students living on the North Shore to attend a school in a much more convenient location and reduced the enrollment at Kamloops High School. In 1959, enrollment was reduced even further with the construction of the John Peterson Building, located only a few hundred feet away and on the same block as KHS. John Peterson Junior High School housed Grade 8 and 9 students, which KHS, now named Kamloops Junior Senior Secondary, educated grades 9–13.

In 1965, the "west wing" of the school received a massive upgrade as a second story was constructed above the original. This new sector, consisting entirely of science-oriented classrooms and labs, was built to specification equalling or exceeding university or senior secondary scientific facilities, and boosted KJSS's reputation as a school with academic-oriented intentions.

Through the 1960s and 1970s, numerous new schools opened in Kamloops, such as Brocklehurst Secondary School in 1968, Valleyview Junior Secondary in 1969, and Sahali Junior Secondary School in 1974, all of which reduced enrollment and boosted future capacity at KJSS and John Peterson. Beginning in the 1975–76 school year, only Grade 11 and 12 students began to attend KJSS, and thus it was renamed to Kamloops Senior Secondary, but was still called Kam High (Kam Hi) by many.

In 1970, the old auditorium at the school was deemed antiquated and inadequate, and was subsequently replaced in 1978 by the present Sagebrush Theatre, which was built on a joint contract with the City of Kamloops, and now serves as a joint school-public theatre, providing a location for school drama classes and also serving as a base for many public productions.

In 2003, the merger of the John Peterson Junior Secondary facilities and Kamloops Senior Secondary resulted in the renaming of the facility to South Kamloops Secondary School (SKSS). The John Peterson building, between 2003 and 2016, served as the location for the senior (secondary) grades of the Beattie School of the Arts (the Elementary contingent was located at McGill Road and Columbia Street, in Lower Sahali). At the end of the 2015–16 school year, however, Stuart Wood Elementary School (which had served in the aforementioned Third and St. Paul plot of land since 1907) closed its doors, and the kids which attended were left without a school. As a response, the two Beattie School of the Arts campuses were amalgamated into one: the John Peterson building. Beginning in the 2016–17 school year, the John Peterson building, renamed to the Kamloops School of the Arts (KSA), served as an artistically oriented K-12 school and the campus previously used for Beattie's elementary students began to house the kids previously enrolled at Stuart Wood School, with the McGill Road Campus assuming the name of McGill Elementary.

In recent years, numerous proposals have been pitched to replace the aging SKSS building with brand-new facilities, but none have succeeded. The building, now the oldest in the district, is constantly undergoing maintenance efforts to ensure it stays operational. The school, according to a 2019 report by School District #73, is #1 on a list for total building replacements, but entirely new schools and expansion projects will most likely take priority before replacement of SKSS may happen.

SKSS now has seven portables in its courtyard

== Notable alumni ==
- Matt Miles class of 2010 - Professional Mountain Biker/Filmmaker
- Kelly Olynyk (class of 2009) - NBA player (San Antonio Spurs)
- Darril Fosty (class of 1987) - Award-winning author and documentarian
- Peter Soberlak (class of 1987) - Former professional ice hockey player drafted in the first round, 21st overall, by the Edmonton Oilers in the 1987 NHL Entry Draft.
- Doug Lidster, (class of 1978) - Former professional ice hockey player, captain of the Vancouver Canucks
- Bert Marshall - Former professional ice hockey player
- Michael Shanks, (class of 1988) - Professional actor; played main characters in Stargate SG-1 and Saving Hope television series
