= Lesa Amoore =

American model, and photographer

Lesa Sullivan Amoore
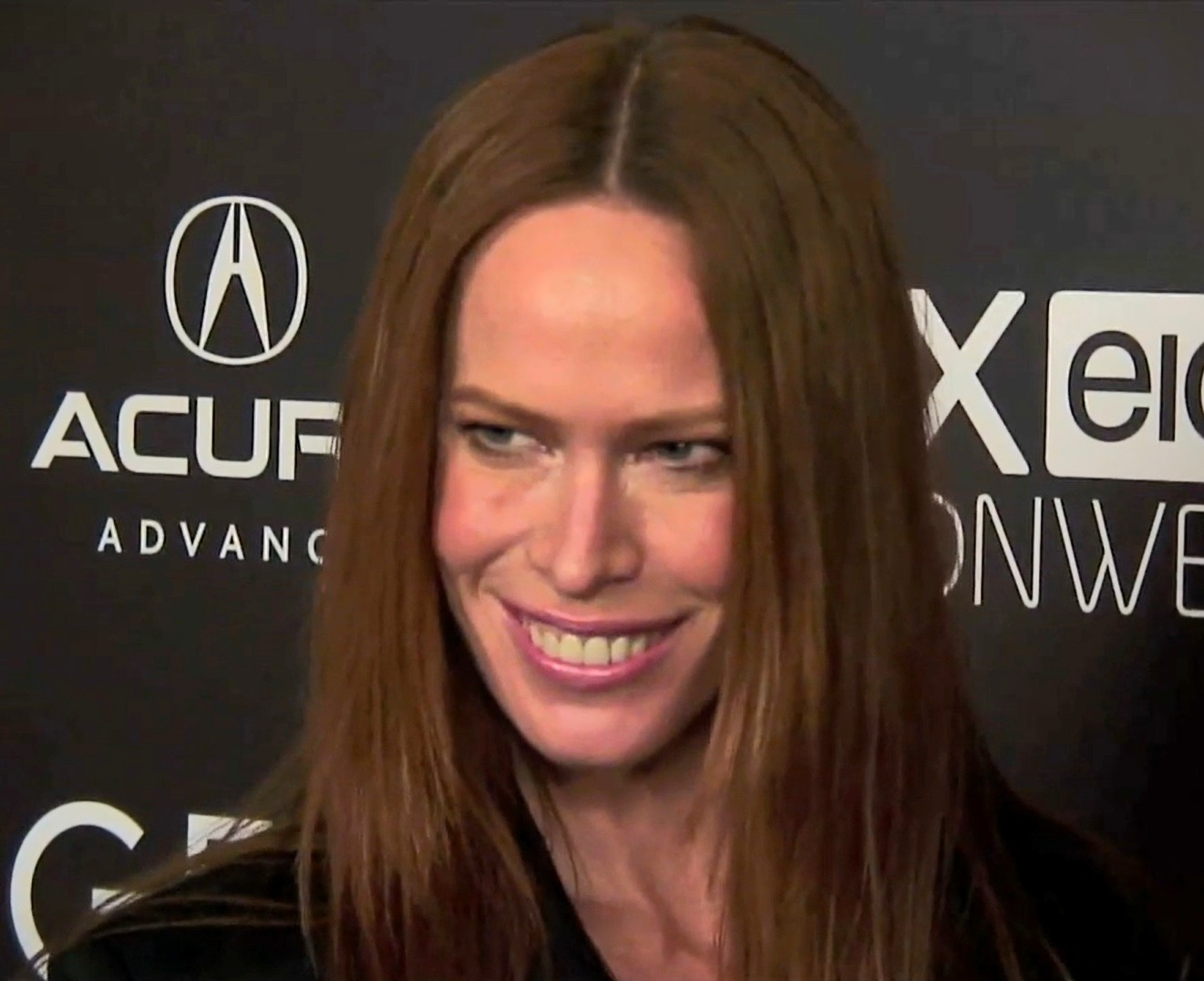
- Amoore in 2009
- Born: San Diego, California, U.S.
- Modeling information
- Height: 5 ft 10 in (1.78 m)
- Hair color: Blonde
- Eye color: Blue
- Website: http://www.lesaamoore.com/

Lesa Sullivan Amoore (born in San Diego) is an American model, and photographer. She has appeared on the covers of magazines such as Vogue, Photo, and ELLE.

== Career ==
Amoore moved to Italy at 17 years old on a modeling contract. After living in Italy, Spain and Germany, she moved to Paris to join Elite Model Management. In 1991, she appeared in a 21-page editorial for Vanity Fair, shot by French photographer Dominique Isserman. That same year she appeared on the covers of Vogue, and French magazine Photo. She has been quoted that she owes her powerful runway strut to J. Alexander (America's Next Top Model, who "taught" her how to walk). On and off the runway, she has worked for John Galliano, Giorgio Armani, Gianni Versace, Azzedine Alaia, Nicole Miller, Calvin Klein, Chantal Thomas, Costume National, and Katharine Hamnett.

Amoore has remained with close ties to fashion business, supporting Los Angeles designers. In the 00's as a fashion stylist for celebrities including Natasha Henstridge, Nicky Hilton, and Guns N' Roses band members Slash and Duff McKagan. In 2001, Amoore created and produced Baby Know It all, a DVD Series for toddlers. The series featured actress Natasha Henstridge as the voices of The Peekaboots. In 2008, Amoore was interviewed about a non-fiction book she was writing, but in a subsequent interview said she put the non-fiction book on hold. From 2007 to 2010, Amoore hosted segments as an on-camera personality in the Hollywood celebrity circuit.

In 2010, Amoore began shooting fashion, beauty, and celebrity photography professionally. Amoore's work has since been published in fashion magazines internationally, including Marie Claire, Elle, and Glamour Italia. In April 2016, Amoore's photography was exhibited at Leica Gallery Los Angeles for MOPLA
Interview with Lesa Amoore, Series "Faire Un Reve", Broad Strokes At Leica.

== Personal life ==
Amoore grew up in San Diego. She currently resides on the California coast. Amoore was married to French photographer Pierre Amoore. They have two sons together.

== Filmography ==
- Young Hollywood - Host
- Munch Kids - Host
- Peace, Love, Bikinis - Herself
- My Baby Know It All - Producer
- The World Ends Without You - Haute Channeler
- Haunt Me, Siren - Director
