= Wedell-Williams Model 22 =

Type of aircraft

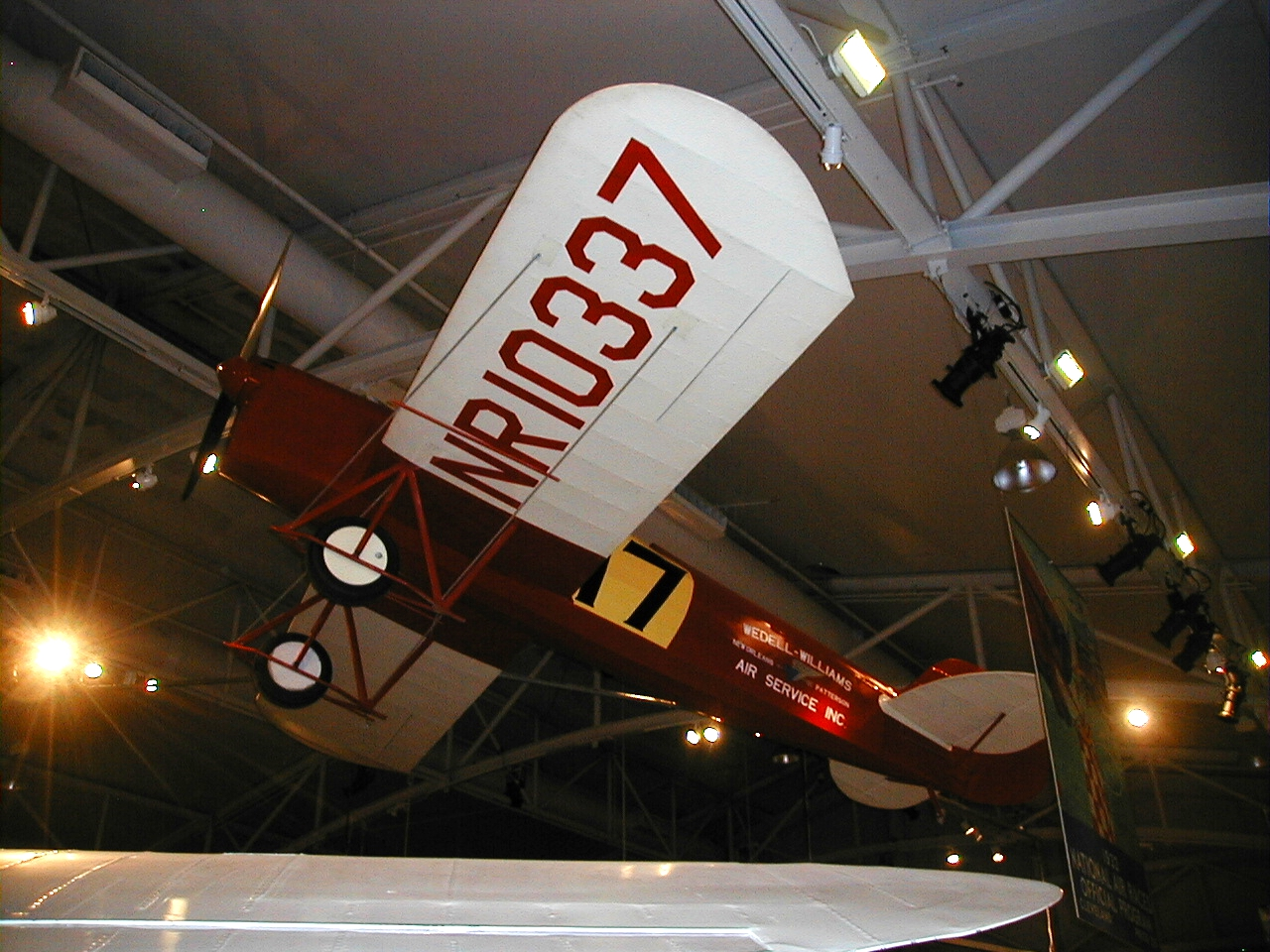
- NR10337, Model 22 Prototype

General information
- Type: Racing aircraft
- National origin: United States
- Manufacturer: Wedell-Williams Air Service Corp. Patterson, Louisiana
- Designer: James R. Wedell
- Status: No survivors.
- Primary users: Wedell-Williams Air Service Corp. W.A. McDonald
- Number built: 2

History
- Manufactured: 1930-1934; Patterson, Louisiana; New Orleans, Louisiana
- Introduction date: July 21, 1930 Cirrus All-American Flying Derby
- First flight: 1930
- Retired: 1935 National Air Races at Cleveland
- Developed into: Wedell-Williams Model 44

The Wedell-Williams Model 22 was a racing aircraft, two examples of which were built in the United States in the early 1930s by the Wedell-Williams Air Service Corporation. It was one of three early projects by aircraft designer Jimmy Wedell to create a racer and was built specifically to compete in the 1930 All-American Flying Derby from Buffalo to Detroit. It was a braced, low-wing monoplane originally powered by an inline Cirrus engine and equipped with fixed landing gear in large spats.

A replica Model 22 is on display at the Wedell-Williams Aviation & Cypress Sawmill Museum, Patterson, Louisiana.

== Design and development ==
Experienced air-racer Wedell formed a business partnership in 1929 with millionaire Harry P. Williams after giving him flying lessons. Initial plans were to teach flying, provide an aerial photography service and win an airmail contract. Wedell's passion for air-racing led him to convince Williams to build a racer for the January, 1930 Miami Air Races.

This first aircraft was named "We-Will" but as development and testing continued it became apparent it would not be ready for the 1930 Miami event. Wedell halted development of the "We-Will" design and began two new aircraft, the "We-Winc" and the "We-Will Jr".

Of these two aircraft, the We-Will Jr would eventually evolve into the "Model 22". It was designed to compete in the American Cirrus Engine Company's "All-American Flying Derby". The only requirement was one of the Cirrus aircraft engines be used in the competing racer. Williams chose the supercharged 110 hp Hi-Drive engine which was a popular choice of racers at the time. Gross weight was 1,660 lbs and it could carry 54 gallons of gasoline.

== Operational history ==
The race began at Detroit, Michigan on July 21, 1930 and was a 5,500 mile cross country endurance race that would end back in Detroit. The hazardous nature of the journey and level of technology at the time challenged the participants and their machines to the utmost. Wedell, piloting the NR10337 and sporting the race number 17, was in contention for first place all the way to the stop at Houston. After this mechanical trouble hampered his efforts and reduced his finish to eighth place.

The NR10337 was next entered in the 1930 National Air Races in Chicago. With the underpowered Cirrus Hi-Drive the performance of the craft was disappointing. Wedell flew in the 350cu free-for-all, finishing third and in the 450cu free-for-all finishing fifth.

Wedell turned his attention to the larger We-Will and We-Willc, with the NR10337 languishing until 1932. In order to compete in the lower power classes, the aircraft was substantially rebuilt. The fuselage was shortened from the wing root aft, the wings were shortened while the Cirrus engine was retained. A Hamilton Standard ground adjustable propeller was fitted for the first time to the Cirrus. The cockpit and cowling were redesigned to be more aerodynamic. Aerodynamic wheel "pants" and "spats" made its first appearance on a Wedell-Williams design, a feature that would be an icon of its larger, more successful cousins. The aircraft was re-registered as NR60Y and was officially designated "Model 22". In this configuration the NR60Y competed in smaller races throughout the south during 1932.

In preparation for the 1933 Los Angeles National Air Races, the NR60Y's Cirrus engine was replaced with a Menasco B6 Buccaneer air-cooled engine. Given race number 54, it was entered in the Shell Speed Dash 550cu race and piloted by W.A. McDonald. In the preliminary events, the Menasco proved troublesome and performance was disappointing. While taxiing, the Menasco engine backfired and ignited the fabric fuselage. The engine was removed from the frame and later installed in the NR64Y. The frame was placed in storage at the Western Airways hangar in Los Angeles until 1934 when Dave Elmendorf purchased it.

1933 brought more development on the Model 22. A second aircraft, NR64Y, was begun in cooperation with the Delgato Trade School in New Orleans. Construction of this aircraft was overseen by a senior mechanic E.D. Dennis. The entire rear fuselage was covered mainly with plywood utilizing a Delgato design. Not ready in time for the 1933 Nationals, NR64Y was trucked to Chicago for the 1933 International Air Races. After a brief test flight on September 1, the aircraft proved to be underpowered with the Menasco B6. Wedell entered one event but retired after a single lap. Testing continued briefly on February 5, 1934, but Wedell decided that further testing of the NR64Y was not warranted and donated the aircraft to Louisiana State University where it was eventually scrapped.

In 1934, Elmendorf began reconstruction of his Model 22. Al Novotny, a former Wedell-Williams employee was hired for the work. A Menasco B6 was fitted to the airframe. Elmendorf flew the NR60Y from Los Angeles to Cleveland for the 1935 National Air Races. He entered the 549cu race as number 22 and qualified fourth but finished a disappointing seventh. In 1936, Elmendorf sold NR60Y and it is presumed the airframe was scrapped.

== Specifications (Model 22 NR60Y) ==
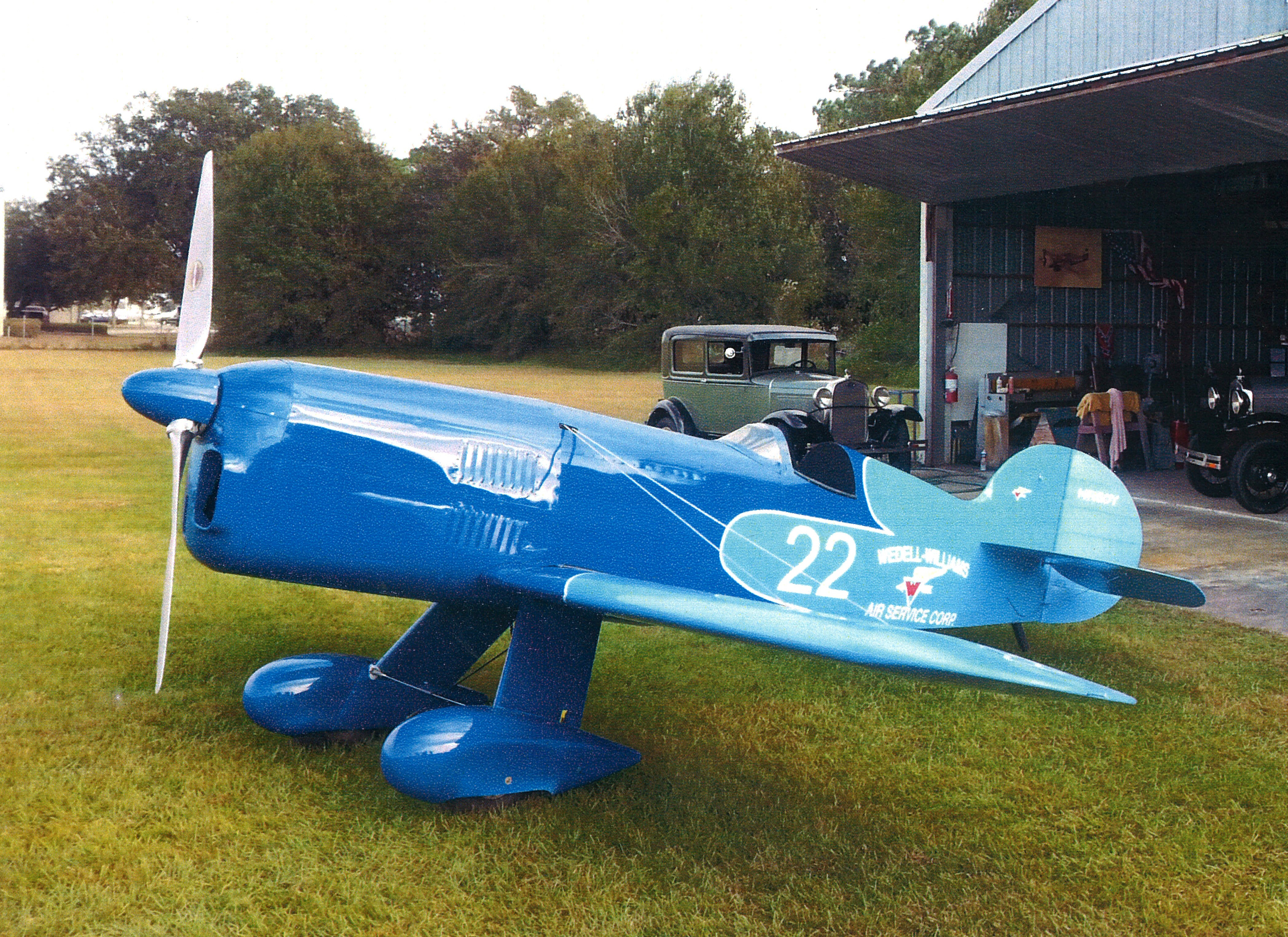
Model 22 replica in 1932 race trim.

General characteristics

- Crew: One pilot
- Length: 18 ft 0 in (5.49 m)
- Wingspan: 20 ft 0 in (6.1 m)
- Height: 6 ft 5 in (1.96 m)
- Powerplant: 1 × Menasco B6 Buccaneer , 160 hp (119.3 kW) at 1,975 RPM max; 120 hp (89.48 kW) at 1,800 RPM cruise

Performance

- Maximum speed: 180 mph (289.7 km/h, 160 kn)

== See also ==
Related development Wedell-Williams Model 44 - Wedell-Williams Model 45 - Wedell-Williams XP-34
