= Wedell-Williams Model 44 =

Type of aircraft

Model 44
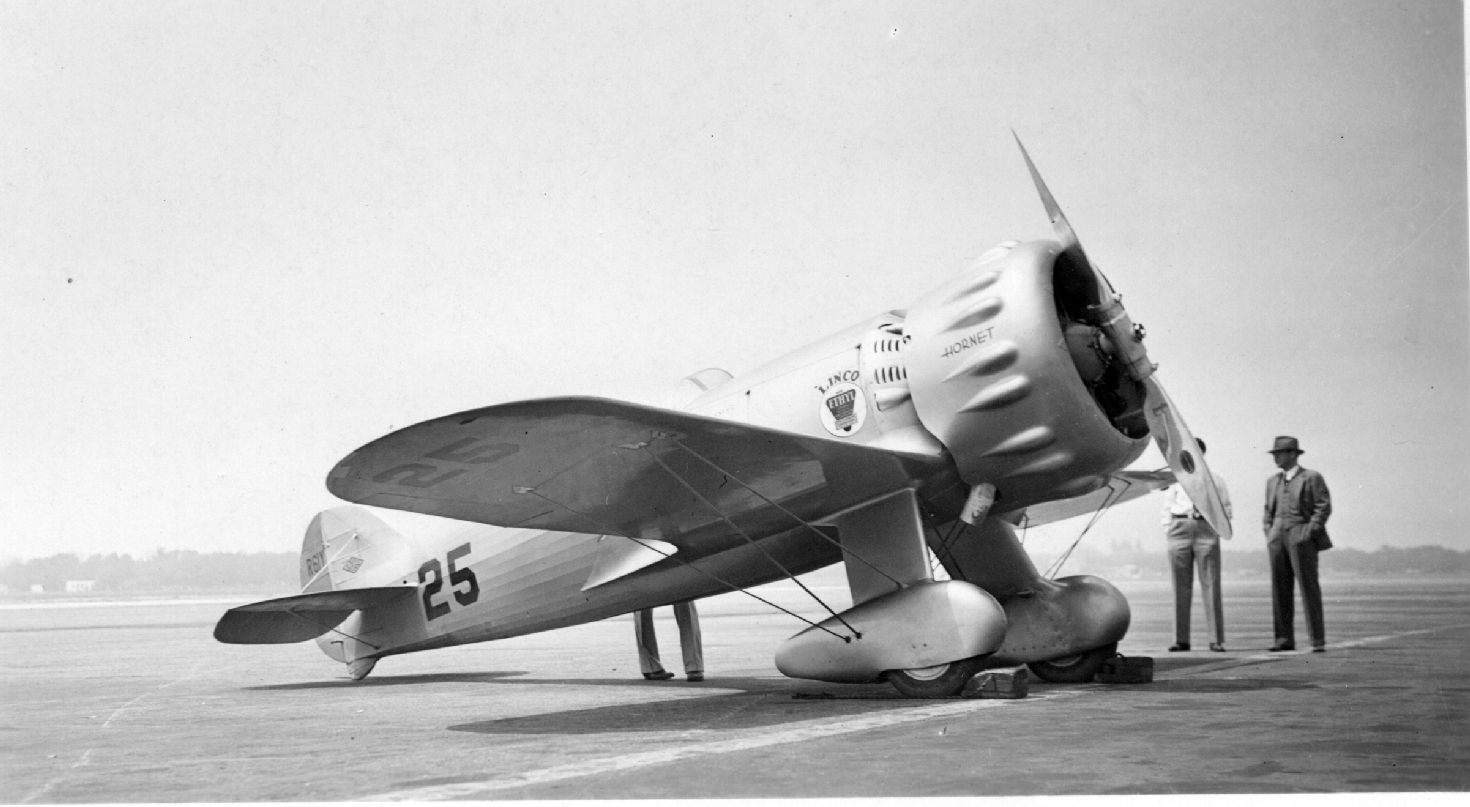
- NR61Y, Roscoe Turner's Model 44

General information
- Type: Racing aircraft
- National origin: United States
- Manufacturer: Wedell-Williams Air Service Corporation
- Designer: Jimmy Wedell
- Status: One survivor, Crawford Auto-Aviation Museum, Cleveland, Ohio
- Primary users: Wedell-Williams Air Service Corp. Roscoe Turner; Mary Haizlip
- Number built: 4

History
- Manufactured: 1930-1931
- Introduction date: 13 June 1930, New Orleans Air Races
- First flight: 12 January 1930
- Retired: 1939 National Air Races
- Developed from: Wedell-Williams Model 22

The Wedell-Williams Model 44 is a racing aircraft, four examples of which were built in the United States in the early 1930s by the Wedell-Williams Air Service Corporation. It began as a rebuilding of the partnership's successful We-Will 1929 racer, but soon turned into a completely new racing monoplane aircraft, powered by a large radial engine. Model 44s became the dominant racers of the 1930s, setting innumerable records including setting a new world speed record in 1933.

The only surviving Model 44 is on display at the Crawford Auto-Aviation Museum, Cleveland, Ohio. Three replica Model 44s are on display at the Wedell-Williams Aviation & Cypress Sawmill Museum, Patterson, Louisiana.

== Design and development ==
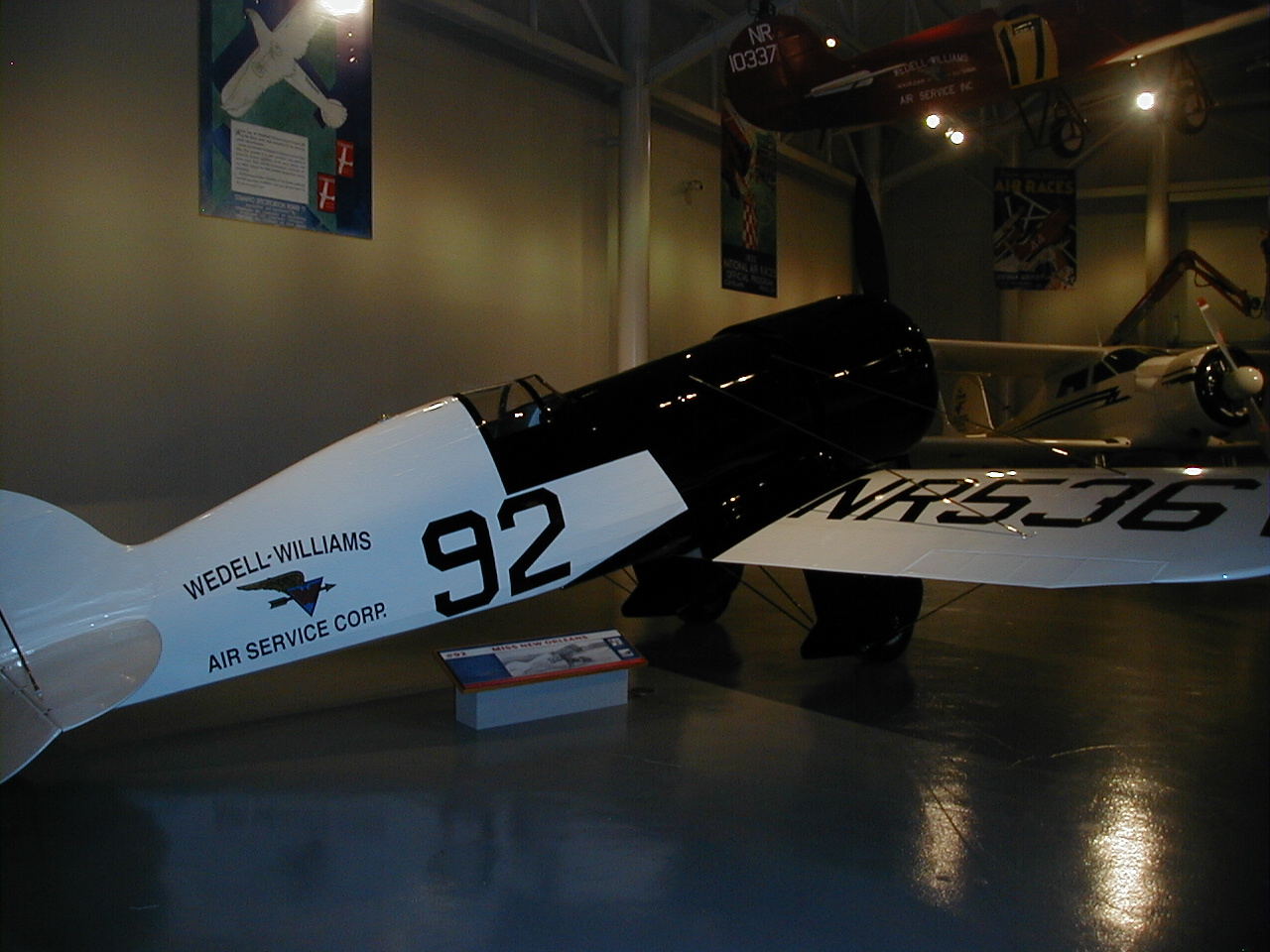
Miss New Orleans

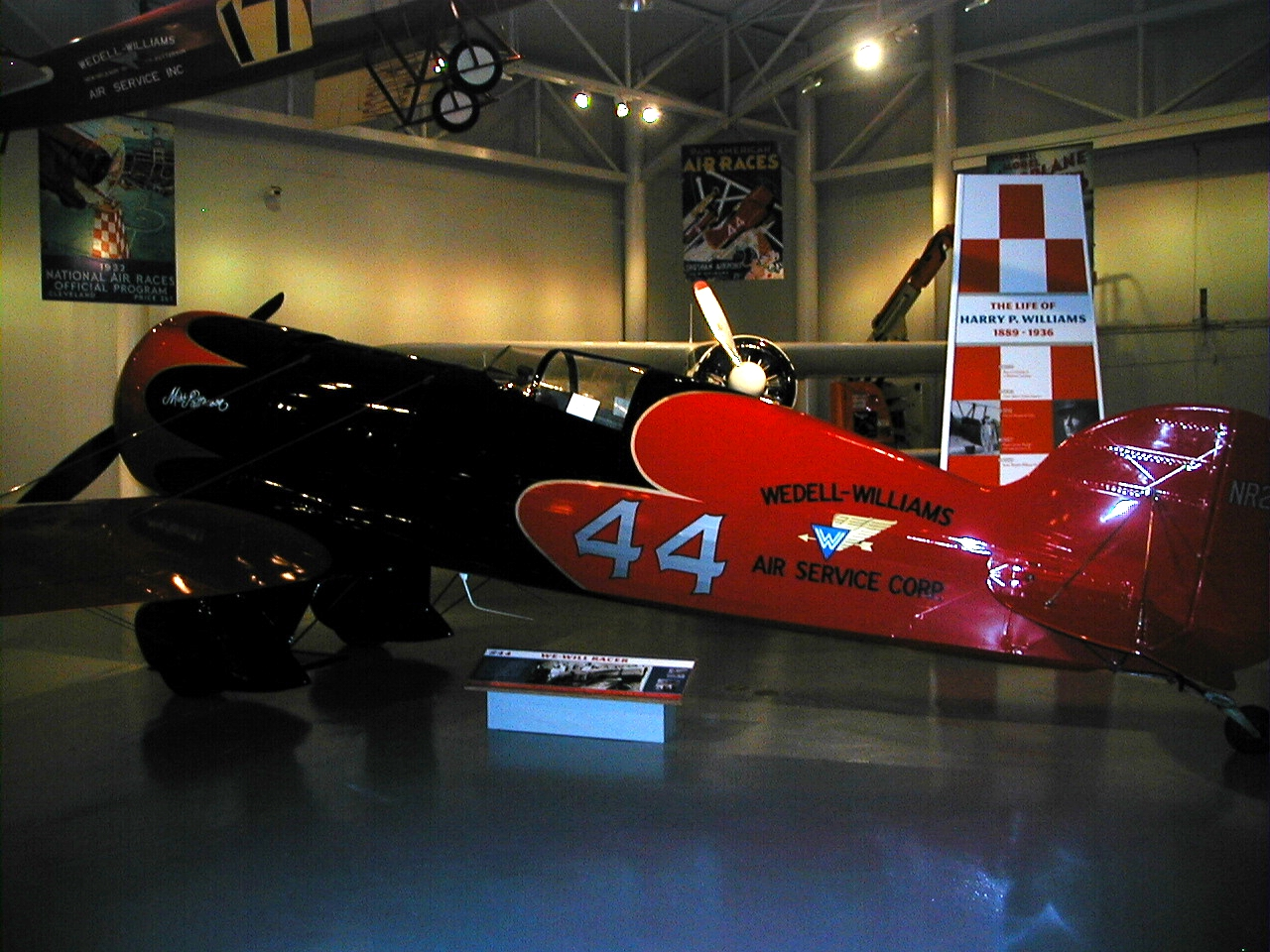
Miss Patterson

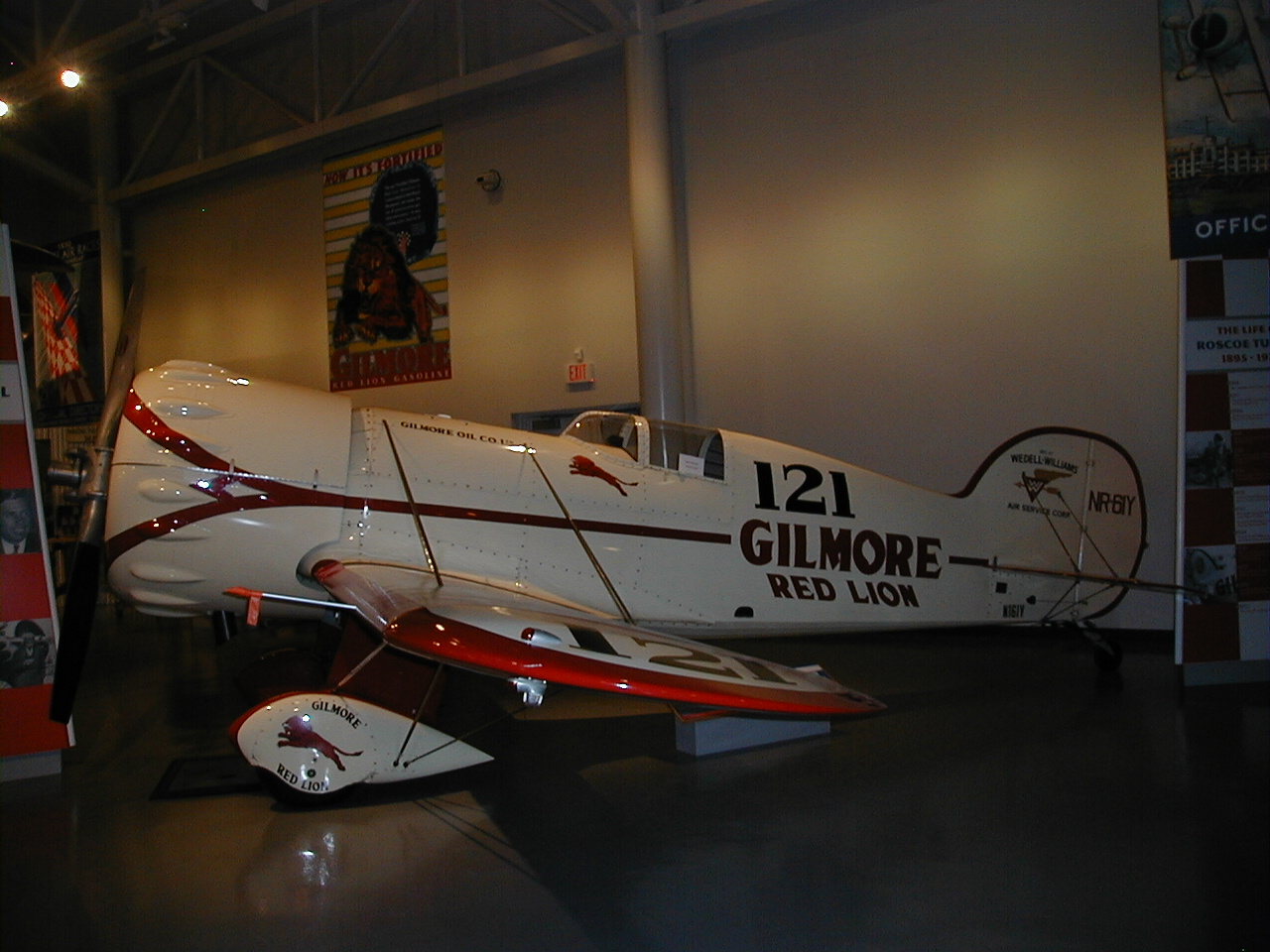
Roscoe Turner Racer

Experienced air-racer Jimmy Wedell formed a business partnership in 1929 with millionaire Harry P. Williams after giving him flying lessons. Initial plans were to teach flying, provide an aerial photography service and win an airmail contract. Wedell's passion for air racing led him to convince Williams to build a racer for the January, 1930 Miami Air Races.

This first aircraft was named "We-Will" but as development and testing continued it became apparent it would not be ready for the 1930 Miami event. Wedell halted development of the "We-Will" design and began a new aircraft, the "We-Winc".

In parallel to the development of the We-Winc, Wedell began the construction of a third aircraft, the "We-Will Jr." This aircraft first appeared in the Cirrus Derby held in Detroit on July 21 but the design proved to be underpowered. Further development with improved aerodynamics, numerous technical innovations and a Hamilton Standard ground adjustable propeller radically changed the aircraft's appearance. Incorporated into the design were the wheel spats that would be an iconic feature of the future racers. It was a typical construction with a braced, low-wing monoplane utilizing fixed landing gear in large spats. This version was however also underpowered. In development and in competition this version, by now dubbed "Model 22" proved to be a disappointment and further development was abandoned.

== Operational history ==
By 1931, Wedell had turned his attention back to the original We-Will and after a rebuild using the lessons learned in building the We-Winc and the We-Will Jr. attained an acceptable level of performance. This version was named the "Model 44". When mated with a Pratt & Whitney Wasp Jr. engine, the design's true potential began to be realized. That year, the "44" placed second at the National Air Races.

Soon after the '31 Nationals, Wedell began rebuilding the 44 and the We-Winc as well as taking a contract to build a Model 44 for the famous aviator Roscoe Turner. On the second test flight of Turner's Model 44, the left wing experienced a structural failure and was destroyed in the ensuing crash. Piloting the aircraft himself, Wedell parachuted to safety. After this incident, the assistance of Howard Barlow, an aeronautical engineer, was obtained in the redesign of the wings. The second Turner racer was built with the new wing design and proved to be an exceptional performer. The other two Model 44s were rebuilt according to the new wing specification as test pilots had noted wing vibrations in both aircraft previously.

These three aircraft went on to dominate air racing for the next several years. Model 44s were raced in 1932, 1933 and 1934 Bendix Trophy races, as well as the 1934 Thompson and Shell Trophy. In September 1933 at the International Air Race in Chicago, the 44 piloted by Wedell set the new world speed record for landplanes at 305.33 miles per hour. Flying a 44, Doug Davis won the 1934 Bendix Trophy, but crashed and was killed while leading the Thompson Trophy Race on September 3, 1934. Roscoe Turner won the Thompson Trophy in a 44 with a different engine, while J. A. Worthen placed third, also in a 44.

== Survivors and replicas ==
Roscoe Turner's Model 44, NR61Y, is on display at the Crawford Auto-Aviation Museum in Cleveland, Ohio. Replicas of all three Model 44s are now displayed at the Wedell-Williams Aviation & Cypress Sawmill Museum - Patterson, a branch of the Louisiana State Museum.

== Specifications (Model 44) ==
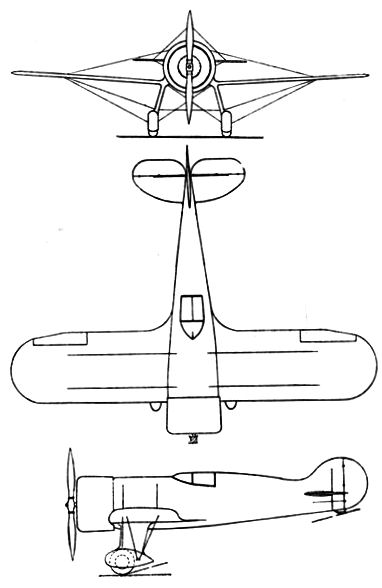
Wedel Williams 44 3-view drawing from L'Aerophile Salon 1932

Data from Race With the Wind: How Air Racing Advanced Aviation

General characteristics

- Crew: 1
- Length: 23 ft 0 in (7.01 m)
- Wingspan: 26 ft 3 in (8.0 m)
- Height: 8 ft 1 in (2.46 m)
- Wing area: 107.9 sq ft (10.02 m^{2})
- Airfoil: M-10 (modified)
- Empty weight: 1,702 lb (772 kg)
- Gross weight: 2,677 lb (1,214 kg)
- Powerplant: 1 × Pratt & Whitney R-1690-S1C3G 9-cyl. air-cooled radial piston engine, 1,020 hp (760 kW)
- Propellers: 2-bladed Hamilton Standard ground adjustable, Curtiss adjustable or Smith adjustable propeller

Performance

- Maximum speed: 325 mph (523 km/h, 282 kn)
- Range: 900 mi (1,400 km, 780 nmi)
- Service ceiling: 14,000 ft (4,300 m)
- Wing loading: 24.83 lb/sq ft (121.2 kg/m^{2})
- Power/mass: 0.38hp/lb (0.63 kW/kg)

== Media appearances ==
- Tail Spin, Twentieth Century Fox Film Corp., 1939

== See also ==
Related development Wedell-Williams Model 22 - Wedell-Williams Model 45 - Wedell-Williams XP-34
