= Jimmy Wedell =

American racing pilot and aircraft designer

James "Jimmy" Robert Wedell
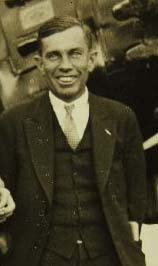
- Jimmy Wedell, c. 1933
- Born: March 31, 1900; Texas City, Texas
- Died: June 24, 1934 (aged 34); Patterson, Louisiana
- Occupations: Aircraft designer, Aircraft Racing
- Known for: Designer of the Wedell-Williams series of air racers
- Parent(s): Robert C. and Ida Wedell

James Robert Wedell (March 31, 1900 – June 24, 1934) was a famous 1930s racing pilot and aircraft designer. Wedell broke the world record for land-plane speed in 1933 when he clocked 305.33 m.p.h. in a Wedell-Williams aircraft of his own design. He won the Thompson Trophy air race in the same year. Wedell's company, the Wedell-Williams Air Service Corporation, won 14 "distinguished finishes" (top five) in the Thompson and Bendix Trophy races.

== Early years ==
Wedell was born in Texas City on March 31, 1900, to Robert and Ida Wedell, who operated a tavern in the town. His brother Walter, born on November 14, 1901, was joined later by sisters, Elizabeth and Mary. With the sudden and premature death of both parents, the brothers were on their own from teen years on. The two brothers were both mechanically inclined, especially working with gasoline engines. Another major interest was aviation and flying.

Wedell left school in the ninth grade to open the Black Star Garage behind the family home. He repaired cars and motorcycles and when the first U.S. Army Air Field was established in Texas City in 1913, he learned to fly, and he later taught his brother.

== Aviation career ==
After buying two junked aircraft, the Wedell brothers constructed a new aircraft from the parts and began to fly as exhibition pilots, barnstorming along the Gulf Coast.

During World War I, his brother enlisted in the Navy but Wedell was turned down because of poor eyesight, having lost sight in one eye in a motorcycle accident. After flying in Mexico and the Gulf Coast, the Army hired Jimmy as a civilian instructor of cadet fliers.

After the war, Wedell returned to the Black Star Garage, working as a mechanic, while designing and building racing planes and barnstorming the country. In 1922, the Wedell brothers left for New Orleans where they started an air service and a flying school. They met millionaire Harry P. Williams from Patterson, Louisiana. Williams was in the oil, sugar and lumber businesses and was married to Marguerite Clark, a former star of silent movies. Wedell taught Williams how to fly and they became the best of friends, bonded by their interest in aviation.

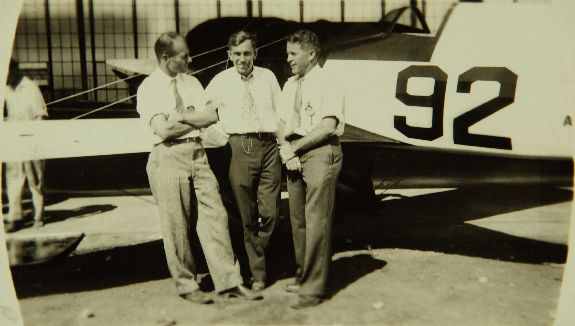
(L–R) Jimmy Doolittle, Jimmy Wedell, and Harry Williams. c. 1933

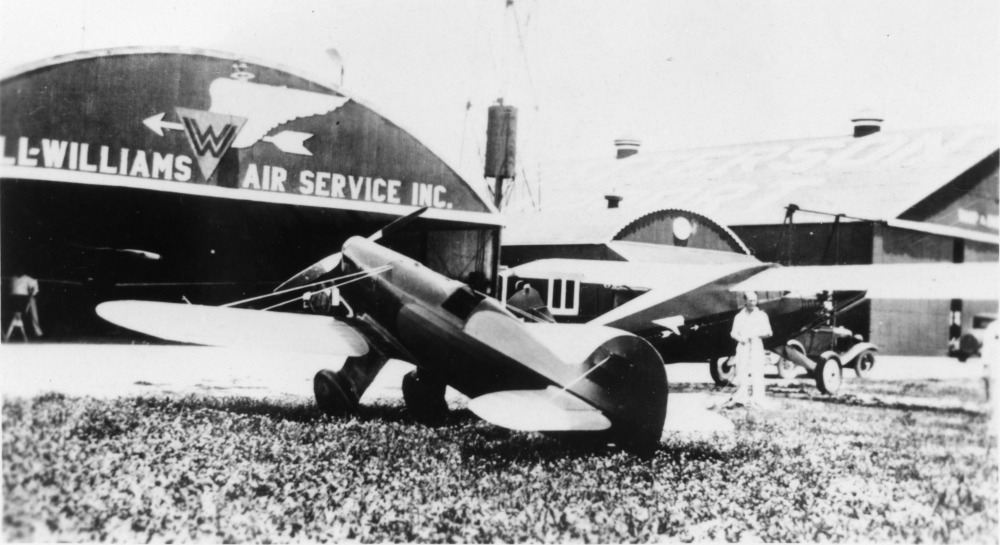
Wedell Williams Model 22 in front of the Wedell-Williams hangar

Continuing his earlier work as a designer, Wedell had a factory built to design and build low-wing monoplanes, starting with the Wedell-Williams Model 22.

The “44” (Wedell-Williams Model 44) became one of the fastest aircraft flying in the United States, Wedell called it, "hot as a .44 and twice as fast." During his lifetime, Wedell held more speed and long-distance records than any other racing pilot. Not only the first to fly at over 300 mph in a "land plane", he also set a “three flags speed” mark, flying from Ottawa, Canada to Washington, and on to Mexico City in 11 hours, 53 minutes. Wedell's best year in air racing was in 1933, when he won races at every competition he entered.

=== Wedell-Williams Air Service Corporation ===
Wedell and Williams created the Wedell-Williams Air Service Corporation in Patterson with the first enterprise being a passenger service from New Orleans to Houston via Baton Rouge, Shreveport and Dallas; it was Louisiana’s first commercial airline. In 1936 (90 years ago), the carrier was acquired by Eastern Air Lines for $160,000. The company also started their own postal air service and opened a flying school.

== Wedell-Williams Museum ==
Patterson Louisiana hosts the Wedell-Williams Aviation Museum.

== Death ==
In 1934, Wedell was involved in not only air racing but also exhibition flying and even flight training. During flight training, he was killed in an accident on June 24, 1934 in Patterson, Louisiana.

Wedell's death received national attention where he was remembered for his love of speed, his innovations in the design of racing planes, and his reputation for "donating his time and talents to those in need". His obituaries included a column by Will Rogers and an article in Time magazine. Wedell is buried in the Columbia Cemetery in West Columbia, Texas.

== See also ==
- Wedell-Williams Model 22
- Wedell-Williams Model 44
- Wedell-Williams Model 45
- Wedell-Williams XP-34
- List of defunct airlines of the United States
