= Harry Palmerston Williams =

American businessman (1889-1936)

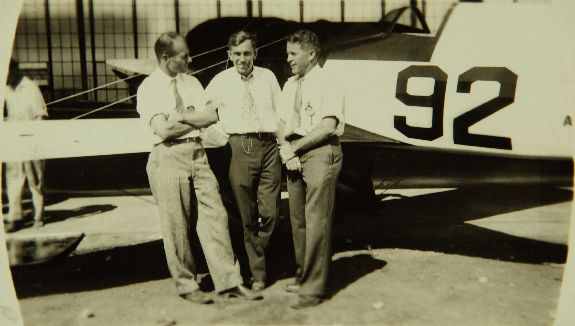
- (L–R) Jimmy Doolittle, Jimmy Wedell and Harry Williams. c. 1933, in front of #92, a Wedell-Williams Model 44 air racer
- Born: October 6, 1889; Patterson, Louisiana, U.S.
- Died: May 19, 1936 (aged 46); Baton Rouge, Louisiana, U.S.
- Occupations: Businessman, politician, aviation company owner
- Spouse: Helen Marguerite Clark (m. 1918)

Harry Palmerston Williams (October 6, 1889 – May 19, 1936) was a Louisiana businessman and co-owner of the Wedell-Williams Air Service Corporation that dominated air racing in the United States during the so-called Golden Age of Aviation.

== Early years ==
Williams was born on October 6, 1889, in Patterson, Louisiana to Francis Bennett Williams and Emily Williamson Seyburn. His father was a prominent Louisiana industrialist and civic leader.

Williams was educated at Lawrenceville Academy, Lawrenceville, New Jersey and at the University of the South, Sewanee, Tennessee. In 1906, like his brothers, he entered his father's lumber business, initially operating a dredge in south Louisiana swamps for $50 a month. In World War I, he served as a lieutenant in the Engineers Corps. After the war, Williams became active in politics, becoming the Mayor of Patterson, as well as serving as the president of police jury in St. Mary Parish and state highway commissioner.

== Business career ==
Williams' was president of the Patterson State Bank, director of the St. Bernard Cypress Co., and treasurer of the Franklin and Abbeville Railway Co. He also served as a director of the Williams, Inc. and F. B. Williams Cypress Co. enterprises which had large holdings in real estate (sugar plantations), industrial ventures such as lumber (the lumber yard was one of the largest in the world), oil and mineral leases.

== Personal life ==
Williams was married to Marian Graham on December 12, 1912, and divorced in 1917. During a World War I War Bonds Tour in the same year, he met famed actress Helen Marguerite Clark and was married on August 19, 1918. The couple were important socialites in Louisiana where Helen presided as acting Tsaritsa of the Mystic Court at the Duke of Alexis Tableau Ball in New Orleans, 1924.

== Aviation career ==
In the late 1920s, the St. Bernard Cypress Co. lumber operation was being wound up, and Williams began to explore other options, first concentrating on a personal interest in speed boats. In 1927, spurred by the news of the Lindbergh solo flight across the Atlantic, he had purchased a similar Ryan monoplane from Jimmy Wedell, a noted race pilot. After working closely with Wedell in learning to fly, Williams formed a partnership with Wedell and his brother, Walter Wedell, forming the Wedell-Williams Air Service Corporation in 1928, based in Patterson. While Wedell provided the "seat-of-his-pants" design ingenuity, Williams provided business acumen and a reported $2 million-dollar stake, and the two friends formed a strong bond.

The Wedell-Williams Air Service Corporation provided a passenger service from New Orleans to Houston, Louisiana's first commercial airline, and also started their own postal air service, as well as operating a flying school. Continuing his earlier work as a designer, Wedell had a factory built to design and build low-wing monoplanes, starting with the Wedell-Williams Model 22, proceeding through the more successful Model 44 and ultimately, the Model 45.

Throughout 1933 and 1934, Wedell-Williams racers set innumerable records and went on to dominate air racing for the next several years. Model 44s were raced in 1932, 1933, and 1934 Bendix Trophy races, as well as the 1934 Thompson and Shell Trophy. The "44" (Wedell-Williams Model 44) became one of the fastest aircraft flying in the United States, Wedell called it, "hot as a .44 and twice as fast." In September 1933 at the International Air Race in Chicago, the 44 piloted by Wedell set the new world speed record of 305.33 miles per hour.

In 1934, Wedell was involved in not only air racing but also exhibition flying and even flight training where he was killed in an accident on June 24, 1934. Wedell's death garnered national attention and was a major blow to the Wedell-Williams Air Service Corporation, but Williams was willing to step up his involvement.

== Death and aftermath ==
On May 19, 1936, as Williams was returning from Baton Rouge where he had a conference with Governor Richard Leche, and flying with the company's chief pilot, John Worthen, their Beechcraft Model 17 Staggerwing crashed on takeoff, killing both men instantly.

The loss of Williams, along with the recent deaths in air crashes of both Wedell brothers who had co-founded the company along with the company test pilot, led his wife, Marguerite Clark Williams, to sell the assets of the company in 1937 to Eastern Air Lines. The new owner, Captain Eddie Rickenbacker, folded in the Wedell-Williams Air Service Corporation into the larger airline operation, gaining the coveted mail route from New Orleans to Houston, giving Eastern its first presence in Texas.

== See also ==
- Wedell-Williams Model 22
- Wedell-Williams Model 44
- Wedell-Williams Model 45
- Wedell-Williams XP-34
