= Wedell-Williams Model 45 =

Type of aircraft

Model 45
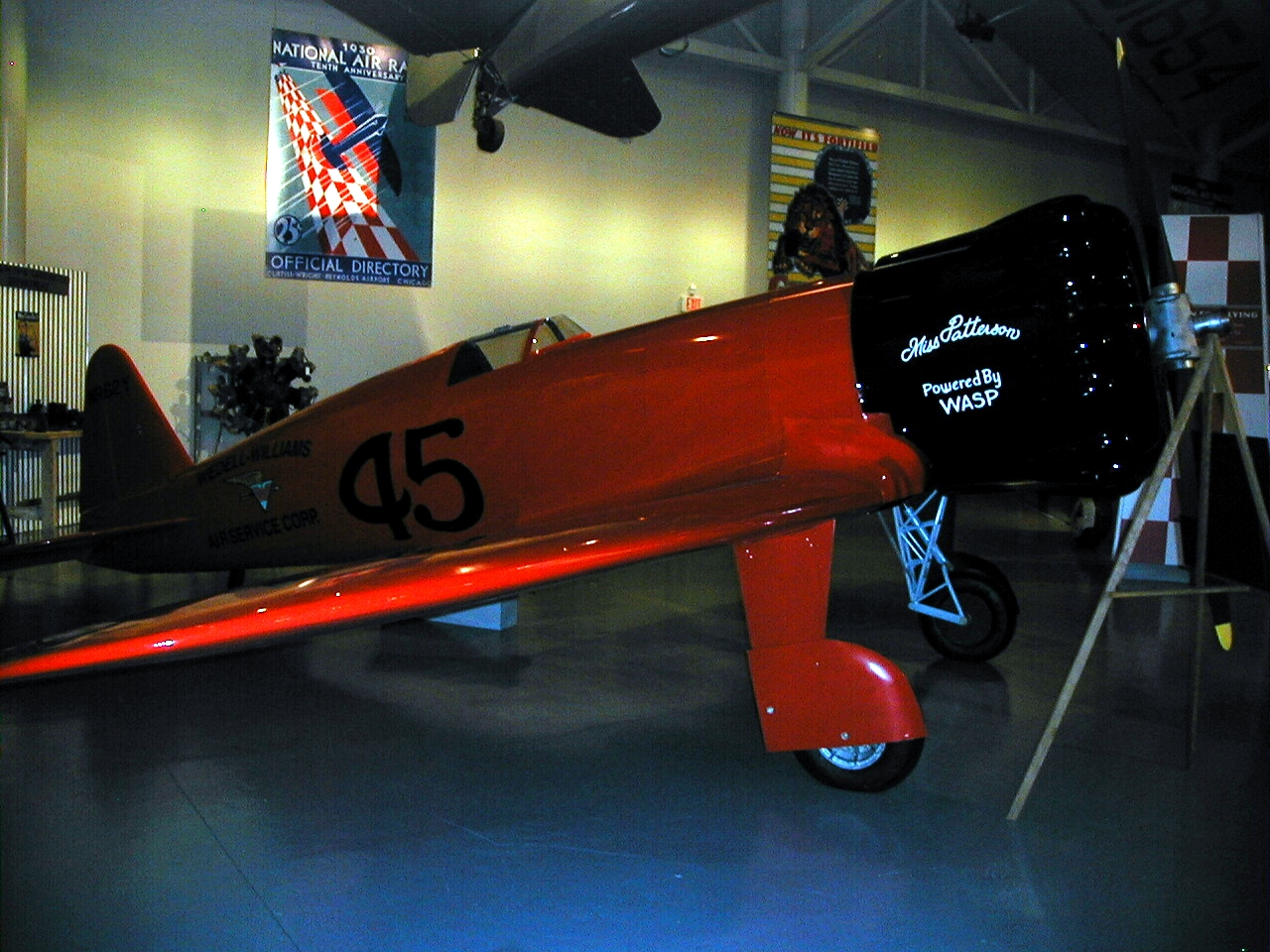
- NR62Y, Miss Patterson.

General information
- Type: Racing aircraft
- National origin: United States
- Manufacturer: Wedell-Williams Air Service Corporation
- Designer: Jimmy Wedell
- Status: Donated to Louisiana State University 1936. Fate unknown.
- Primary user: Wedell-Williams Air Service Corp.
- Number built: 1

History
- Manufactured: 1933–1934
- Introduction date: February 1934, New Orleans Shushan Airport
- First flight: 28 June 1933
- Retired: 1934 Thompson Trophy Race
- Developed from: Wedell-Williams Model 44
- Developed into: Wedell-Williams XP-34

The Wedell-Williams Model 45 was a racing aircraft built in the United States in 1933.

== Design and development ==
The Model 45 was a development of designer James Wedell's earlier Model 44 and was a low-wing cantilever monoplane with tailwheel undercarriage, the main units of which were retractable.

== Operational history ==
The Model 45 flew for the first time on June 28, 1933 and showed promising performance achieving an average speed of 264.703 mph on a 100 km closed course.

Wedell-Williams pilot, John Worthen flew the 45 to a second place in the 1934 Bendix Trophy race and if not for a navigation error would have demolished the 44's first place time by at least 50 minutes.

On June 24, 1934, Jimmy Wedell died in an accident while piloting a Gypsy Moth on a flying lesson. Development of the 45 was delayed following the loss of its creator. Even so, the 45 was entered in the 1934 Thompson Trophy Race. In a preliminary event, the Shell Speed Dash Unlimited, Worthen placed first with an average speed of 302.13 mph. He then qualified the 45 with a speed of 292.14 mph, third behind the 44 and Turner's racer in the main event. However the 45 was still suffering from development problems and was withdrawn due to instability.

During the Thompson race Doug Davis crashed the 44 and was killed instantly. Devastated, the Wedell-Williams team dismantled and trucked the 45 to Patterson. It never flew again.

In rapid succession, the remaining Wedell-Williams principals were killed in air crashes: Walter Wedell, Jimmy's brother, was killed in a crash on July 18, 1935. Company co-founder Harry Palmerston Williams and chief test pilot, John Worthen were both killed on May 19, 1936 in a crash.

After the death of Williams, the Model 45 was donated to Louisiana State University, where it eventually disappeared, its final fate unknown.

A full-scale replica Model 45, constructed by Jim B. Clevenger of Kissimmee, Florida, is on display at the Wedell-Williams Aviation & Cypress Sawmill Museum in Patterson, Louisiana.

== Specifications (Model 45) ==
General characteristics

- Crew: One pilot
- Length: 23 ft 11 in (7.29 m)
- Wingspan: 26 ft 9 in (8.16 m)
- Height: 9 ft 4 in (2.84 m)
- Powerplant: 1 × Pratt & Whitney R-1340 , 500 hp (597 kW)

Performance

- Maximum speed: 320 mph (515 km/h, 278 kn)

== See also ==
Related development

- Wedell-Williams Model 44
- Wedell-Williams XP-34

Aircraft of comparable role, configuration, and era

- Model 44
