= Kenny Hilliard =

American football player (born 1991)

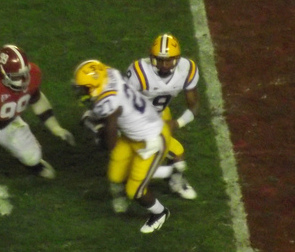
- Hilliard (#27) with the LSU Tigers in 2011

No. 22, 35, 38
- Position: Running back

Personal information
- Born: October 3, 1991 (age 35); Patterson, Louisiana, U.S.
- Listed height: 6 ft 0 in (1.83 m)
- Listed weight: 235 lb (107 kg)

Career information
- High school: Patterson (LA)
- College: LSU
- NFL draft: 2015: 7th round, 235th overall pick

Career history
- Houston Texans (2015–2017)*; Washington Redskins (2017); Memphis Express (2019)
- * Offseason or practice squad member only
- Stats at Pro Football Reference

Kenny Hilliard (born October 3, 1991) is an American former professional football running back. He played college football at Louisiana State University for the LSU Tigers football team. He was selected by the Houston Texans in the seventh round of the 2015 NFL draft.

== Early life ==
Hilliard graduated from Patterson High School in 2011. He committed to LSU on December 19, 2009. Hilliard played in the 2011 U.S. Army All-American Bowl.

Hilliard was regarded as one of the best running backs of the class of 2011, and was featured in Sports Illustrated "Where will they be?" series. He is the cousin of former NFL wide receiver Ike Hilliard, and the nephew of former NFL running back Dalton Hilliard. He set the LHSAA state rushing record in his senior season.

== College career ==
Hilliard made his debut for the Tigers in their first game against the Oregon Ducks on September 3, 2011. He scored his first touchdown in a game versus the Auburn Tigers. He went on to score 8 more touchdowns on the year in games against the Auburn Tigers (2), Western Kentucky (2), Ole Miss (1), Arkansas (1), and Georgia (3). By far his best performance his freshman year came in the Arkansas game where he rushed for 102 yards on 19 carries and scored 1 touchdown. He was named Southeastern Conference (SEC) Freshman of the Week for his performance. Another notable performance came in the SEC Championship Game against the Georgia Bulldogs where he picked up 72 rushing yards on 8 carries scoring two touchdowns. He also had 1 reception for 8 yards and a touchdown. All three of his touchdowns came in the third quarter of the contest tying the record for most touchdowns in an SEC Championship game. In his freshman season he had 324 rushing yards on 57 carries with 8 touchdowns and 3 receptions for 13 yards and 1 touchdown. He was named to the SEC All-Freshman team for his efforts.

== Professional career ==
Pre-draft measurables
Height	Weight	Arm length	Hand span	40-yard dash	20-yard shuttle	Three-cone drill	Vertical jump	Broad jump
5 ft 11 5/8 in (1.82 m)	226 lb (103 kg)	31 1/4 in (0.79 m)	9 1/4 in (0.23 m)	4.83 s	4.40 s	7.17 s	27.0 in (0.69 m)	9 ft 3 in (2.82 m)
All values from NFL Combine

=== Houston Texans ===
Hilliard was selected by the Houston Texans in the seventh round, 235th overall, in the 2015 NFL draft. He was released by the Texans on September 5, 2015, and was signed to the practice squad. He signed a reserve/future contract with the Texans on January 11, 2016.

On September 3, 2016, Hilliard was released by the Texans. He was re-signed to the practice squad on November 15, 2016. He signed a reserve/future contract with the Texans on January 16, 2017.

On May 16, 2017, Hilliard was waived by the Texans.

=== Washington Redskins ===
On July 31, 2017, Hilliard signed with the Washington Redskins. He was waived on September 2, 2017. He was re-signed to their active roster on December 23, 2017. He was waived by the Redskins on December 27, 2017, and re-signed to the practice squad. He signed a reserve/future contract with the Redskins on January 1, 2018. He was waived by the Redskins on March 6, 2018.

=== Memphis Express ===
In 2018, Hilliard signed with the Memphis Express of the Alliance of American Football for the 2019 season. He failed to make the final roster. He was added to the team's rights list and re-signed to a contract on March 18, 2019, and placed on the active roster on March 19. The league ceased operations in April 2019.
