= Pharr Chapel United Methodist Church =

Church in Louisiana, United States

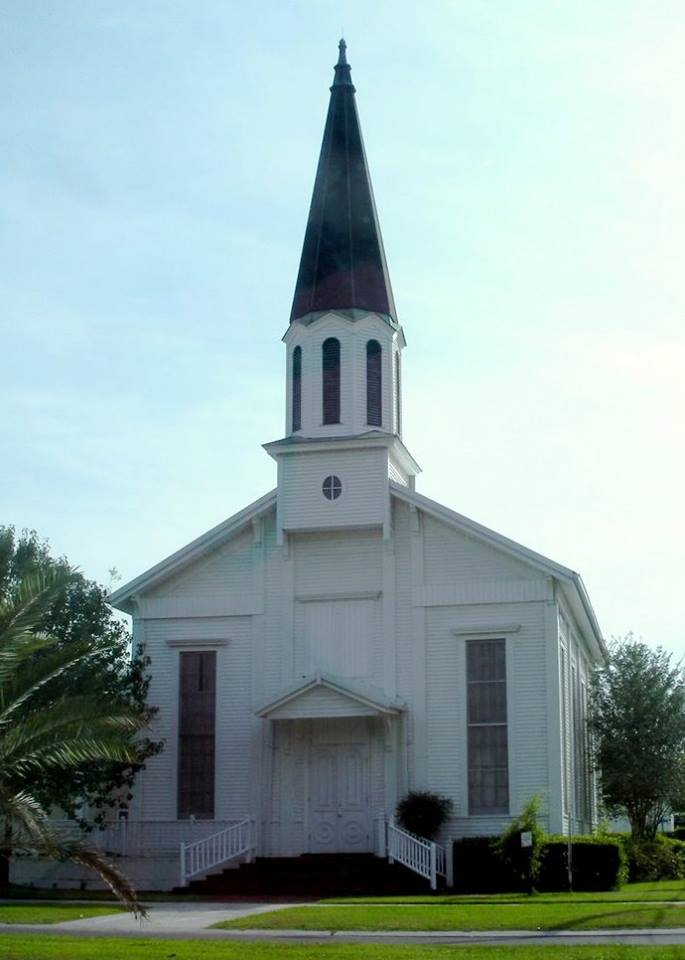

- Location in Louisiana Location in United States
- 29°41′46.1″N 91°12′20.4″W
- Location: 517 Federal Avenue, Morgan City, Louisiana 70380
- Country: United States
- Denomination: United Methodist Church
- Website: pharrchapelumc.org

History
- Founded: 1878

Clergy
- Bishop: Bishop Cynthia Fierro Harvey
- Pastor: Reverend L. John Locascio

Pharr Chapel United Methodist Church was established in 1878 in Morgan City, LA, through donations made by the Pharr family.

== History ==
When the Pattersonville (now Patterson, LA) church was formed in the mid-1800s, its pastor made trips to Morgan City to hold services. A congregation developed in Morgan City by 1860 and was meeting with other Protestants in a church/school building erected by the town. By 1875, Reverend A.E. Clay was appointed to serve the Morgan City and Berwick areas.

The Methodist Episcopal Church, South, purchased a lot (No. 8, Square 15) for $150.50. The cornerstone for the Pharr Chapel sanctuary was laid on April 4, 1878.

The first parsonage was built in 1880 on a lot next to the church that had been purchased on May 4, 1879, for $150. In 1912, the original two-story parsonage was torn down and replaced by another two-story parsonage on a lot donated by the Pharr family. In 1954, the second parsonage was torn down and replaced by a one-story home. The present parsonage in the Lakeside Subdivision was built in 1975.

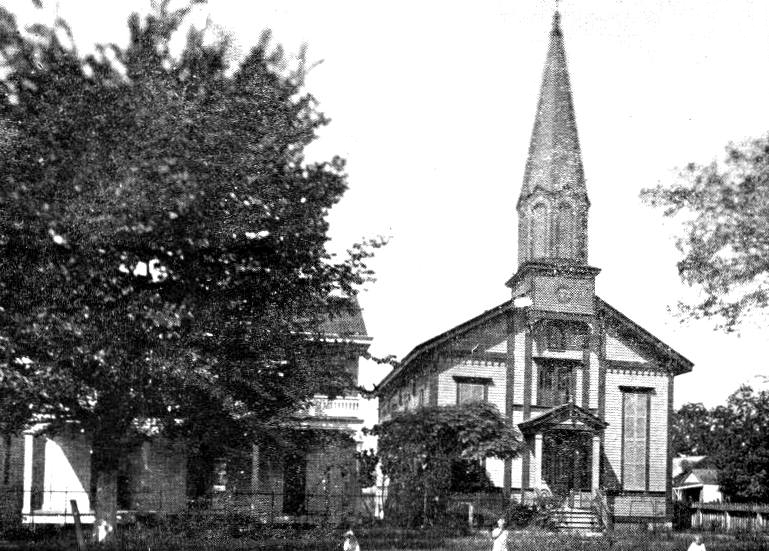
Pharr Chapel and Parsonage (1915)

In 1916, Mr. John A. Pharr donated a pipe organ, which he played until his death in 1955. In 1956, his daughter, Elizabeth, had the organ completely renovated. The interior of the sanctuary was also redecorated at this time, which included four brass chandeliers donated by the Bass family.

From 1926 to 1933, the pastor at Pharr Chapel would take a "missionary boat," the Elizabeth James and minister to the rural areas along the surrounding bayous. The mission was discontinued due to financial difficulties brought on by the Great Depression. Reverend D.B. Boddie resumed the mission work in 1940.

Under the leadership of Reverend E.W. Day, the education building was constructed in 1936, with the second story added in 1948 (under the leadership of Reverend E.L. Tatum). In 1960, the Bass family provided memorial funds to furnish a chapel in the building. At the same time, the educational building was enlarged, renovated, and attached to the sanctuary.

In 1965, the sanctuary received a face lift, which included carpeting and new pews. But later that year, disaster struck when the steeple was destroyed by Hurricane Betsy. The steeple was rebuilt by 1966 at a cost of $30,000. In the 1960s and 70s, several properties were purchased on the block to allow for future expansion.

During the 1980s the educational building was given a complete facelift as a result of a congregation-wide effort to further the impact of ministry done through this facility.

When Morgan City and the surrounding areas were struck by Hurricane Andrew in 1992, the sanctuary suffered major damage. Lightning during the storm split the steeple apart; it was damaged beyond repair. In addition to the destruction of the steeple, many windows were blown in and the front of the sanctuary was partially pulled away from the building. The subsequent water damage ruined the carpeting, many pews, hymnals, and other things in the sanctuary. Damage to the educational building was slight. After about six months and nearly $125,000 in repairs, everything was restored and fully repaired.

Pharr Chapel celebrated 125 years during the weekend of May 17–18, 2003. Bishop William Hutchinson of the Louisiana Annual Conference presided at the celebratory services. Many current and former members were in attendance, as were many former pastors and/or their spouses.
