= Ike Hilliard =

American football player and coach (born 1976)

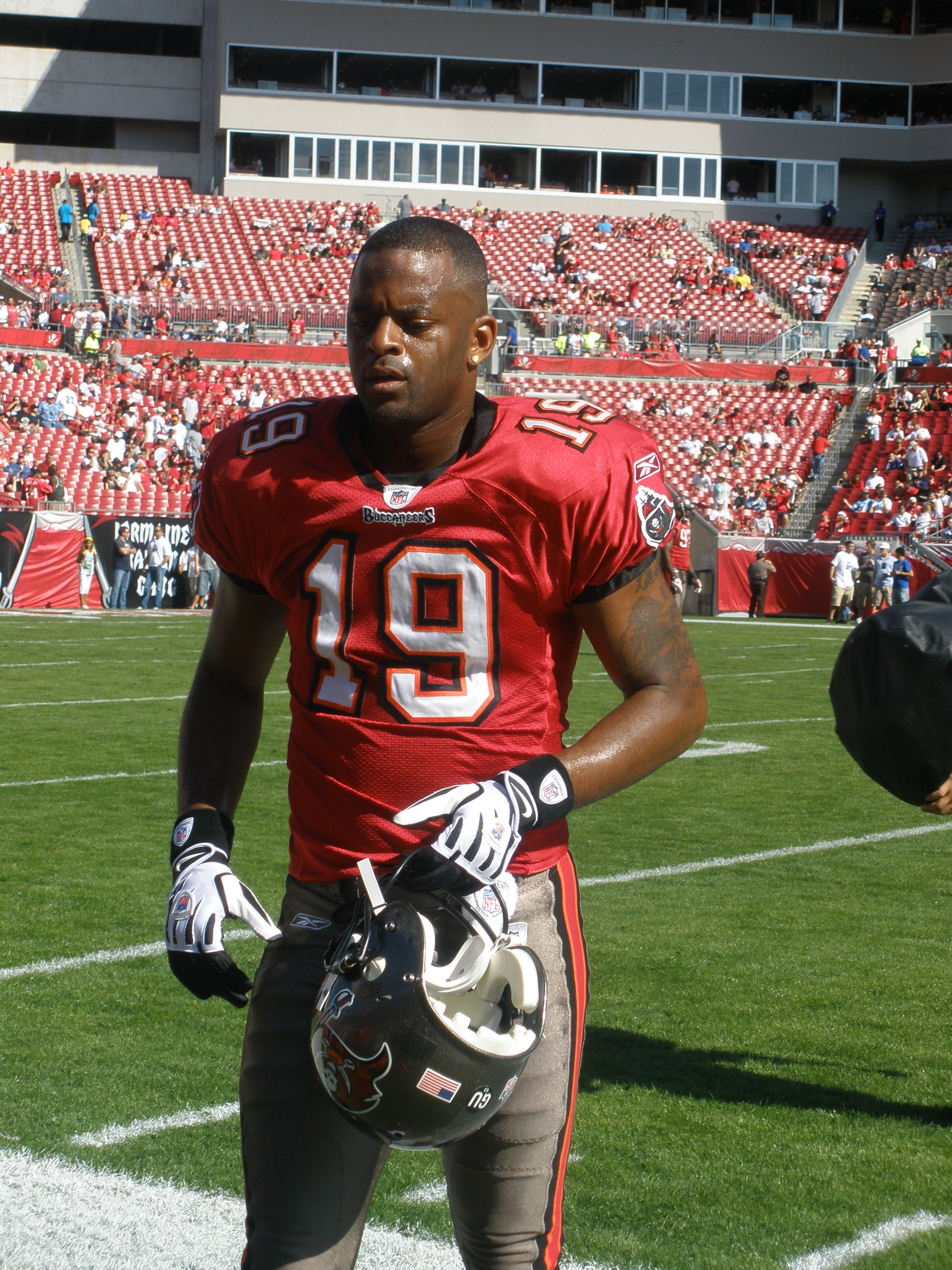
- Hilliard with the Tampa Bay Buccaneers in 2008

California Golden Bears
- Title: Co-offensive coordinator/wide receivers coach

Personal information
- Born: April 5, 1976 (age 50); Patterson, Louisiana, U.S.
- Listed height: 5 ft 11 in (1.80 m)
- Listed weight: 210 lb (95 kg)

Career information
- Position: Wide receiver (No. 88, 19)
- High school: Patterson
- College: Florida (1994–1996)
- NFL draft: 1997: 1st round, 7th overall pick

Career history

Playing
- New York Giants (1997–2004); Tampa Bay Buccaneers (2005–2008)

Coaching
- Florida Tuskers (2009–2010) Wide receivers coach; Miami Dolphins (2011) Assistant wide receivers coach; Washington Redskins (2012) Wide receivers coach; Buffalo Bills (2013) Wide receivers coach; Washington Redskins (2014–2019) Wide receivers coach; Pittsburgh Steelers (2020–2021) Wide receivers coach; Auburn (2022) Wide receivers coach & interim co-offensive coordinator; Atlanta Falcons (2024–2025) Wide receivers coach; California (2026–present) Co-offensive coordinator & wide receivers coach

Awards and highlights
- Bowl Alliance national champion (1996); Consensus All-American (1996); First-team All-SEC (1996); Second-team All-SEC (1995); Florida–Georgia Hall of Fame; University of Florida Athletic Hall of Fame; SEC Football Legend (2011)

Career NFL statistics
- Receptions: 546
- Receiving yards: 6,397
- Receiving touchdowns: 35
- Stats at Pro Football Reference

Isaac Jason Hilliard (born April 5, 1976) is an American football coach and former wide receiver who is currently the Co-offensive coordinator/Wide receivers coach for California. He played primarily with the New York Giants.

Hilliard played college football for the Florida Gators, earning consensus All-American honors in 1996. He was a first-round pick (seventh overall) by the New York Giants in the 1997 NFL draft. Hilliard also played for the Tampa Bay Buccaneers before retiring in 2008.

== Early life ==
Hilliard was born in Patterson, Louisiana in 1976. He attended Patterson High School, where he was a star high school football player for the Patterson Lumberjacks. During his senior year, he played quarterback, wingback and free safety. That year, he rushed for 737 yards and 12 touchdowns, caught 20 passes for 310 yards and two touchdowns, had 45 tackles and intercepted five passes. He was rated among the top 10 defensive backs in the Southeast, but his desire was to play wide receiver.

== College career ==
Hilliard accepted an athletic scholarship to attend the University of Florida in Gainesville, Florida, where he played wide receiver for coach Steve Spurrier's Florida Gators football team from 1994 to 1996 although never having played the position before. During his three seasons as a Gator, the team won three SEC Championships in 1994, 1995, and 1996. As a junior in 1996, he was paired with fellow Gators receiver Reidel Anthony and both posted 1,000-yard seasons, and both Hilliard and Anthony were recognized as first-team All-Southeastern Conference selections and consensus first-team All-Americans, as the Gators won the Bowl Alliance national championship—their first-ever national football title. Hilliard's efforts made him a semi-finalist for the Fred Biletnikoff Award in 1996. The Gators finished the season with a record of 12–1 after a 52–20 victory over the top-ranked Florida State Seminoles in the 1997 Sugar Bowl. Hilliard had a sensational performance in the 1997 Sugar Bowl victory for Florida against their arch rival Florida State. His most well known play, known as the "stop and pop" occurred during this game, as he snagged a Danny Wuerffel pass, took one hard step towards the end zone, then stopped on a dime, avoiding Seminole defenders as he dashed the remaining 15 yards to the end zone. It was the second of a Sugar Bowl-record three touchdowns for Hilliard and it gave the Gators a 24–10 advantage in what ended as a 52–20 Florida victory. Memorably, he set three Sugar Bowl records against the Seminoles at the time: he had 150 receiving yards, including an 82-yard touchdown catch, and scored a total of three touchdowns for eighteen points.

Hilliard was among the members of the 11th-anniversary class inducted into the Florida-Georgia Hall of Fame. Hilliard's signature game against Georgia came in 1995 when he hauled in five passes for 99 yards and two touchdowns, as the Gators claimed a 52–17 victory over the Bulldogs. He was inducted into the University of Florida Athletic Hall of Fame as a "Gator Great" in 2009.

Hilliard was honored as an SEC Legend in 2011. He was chosen for the Florida Football All-Century Team, chosen by Gator fans and compiled by The Gainesville Sun in the fall of 1999. Additionally, he was selected to the 100th-Anniversary Florida team that was selected in 2006 to celebrate a century of Florida football. Fans voted by mail and online.

=== SEC Record Book ===
Sources:

- 2011 SEC Football Legend
- 1996 consensus All-American
- 5th in receiving touchdowns (29) 1994–1996
- 18th in receiving yards per reception (17.6)
- 1st wide-receiver combination in SEC history to have 1,000 yards receiving in the same season: Chris Doering with 1,045 and Hilliard with 1,008 (1995)

=== Florida career records ===
- 1st All-time in receiving touchdowns in a single game (4) 1995
- 2nd All-time receiving touchdowns (29) 1994–1996
- 4th All-time receiving touchdowns in a single season (15) 1995
- 7th All-time in receiving yards (2,214) 1994–1996
- 8th All-time receiving yards in a single game (192) 1995

=== Sugar Bowl records ===
Sources:

- Most receiving touchdowns
- 9th-most receiving yards
- 3rd-highest average yards per reception

Hilliard declared himself eligible for the NFL draft after his junior season, and finished his college career with 126 receptions for 2,214 yards and twenty-nine touchdowns. In a 2006 series published by The Gainesville Sun, he was recognized as No. 14 among the 100 all-time greatest Gator players from the first century of Florida football.

== Professional career ==
Pre-draft measurables
Height	Weight	Arm length	Hand span
5 ft 11 7/8 in (1.83 m)	189 lb (86 kg)	32 5/8 in (0.83 m)	9 1/2 in (0.24 m)

=== New York Giants ===
The New York Giants selected Hilliard in the first round (seventh overall) of the 1997 NFL Draft. He played his first eight seasons for the Giants from 1997 to 2004. He became a regular starter in 1998, catching 51 passes in 16 games for 715 yards and two touchdowns. In his next season, he caught 72 passes for 996 yards for three touchdowns; this was the closest he came to a 1,000-yard season as a receiver, although he rushed three times for 16 yards with a touchdown to have 1,012 yards from scrimmage. In 2000, he played in fourteen games and caught 55 passes as the Giants made a run all the way to the Super Bowl. In the 2000 postseason, it was Hilliard who led players with receptions, catching 16 passes in three games for 220 yards and two touchdowns. His two scores each came in the NFC Championship Game, catching the first touchdown of the game and the penultimate score in a 41-0 destruction of the Minnesota Vikings to send the Giants to their first Super Bowl in a decade. In Super Bowl XXXV, he was targeted eleven times but caught just three passes for 30 yards as the Giants were beat 34-7 by the Baltimore Ravens.

A string of injuries kept him off the field throughout his time with the Giants. During the second game of his rookie year, Hilliard was hit by Jacksonville safety Chris Hudson and sustained a sprained interspinous ligament between his sixth and seventh vertebrae. He underwent posterior spine stabilization surgery, which fused the two vertebrae. After an 8-month rehabilitation period, Hilliard was named an Ed Block Courage Award recipient in 1998, which are voted on by their teammates as role models of inspiration, sportsmanship, and courage. He continued at his level of play with disregard for his personal safety, which created a cringe-inducing medical record: bruised lungs and a bruised sternum in 2000, foot surgery before the 2001 season, and a dislocated shoulder in 2002.

With the Giants, Hilliard recorded 368 receptions for 4,630 receiving yards and 27 touchdowns. He currently ranks seventh in franchise history in receptions and tenth in receiving yards. He signed a one-day contract to retire with the Giants on July 30, 2010.

=== Tampa Bay Buccaneers ===
On May 6, 2005, it was reported that Hilliard signed with the Tampa Bay Buccaneers. During his first two seasons with Tampa Bay, he was used mainly as a third or fourth receiver, but in 2007, he started ten games, in which he made sixty-two receptions for 722 yards. During his time with the Bucs, he became a third down specialist, with 111 of 178 career catches resulting in a first down. Head coach Jon Gruden referred to him as "Third and Ike".

On October 19, 2008, Hilliard refused to be carted off the field during a Sunday Night Football 20–10 win over the Seattle Seahawks. Seattle linebacker Leroy Hill made a helmet-to-helmet collision to Hilliard, as Seahawks linebacker Lofa Tatupu hit Hilliard from behind, forcing his body to go limp, after making a catch in the second quarter.

After four seasons with the team, Hilliard was released by the Buccaneers on February 25, 2009. He was one of five veterans that the Bucs released that day, the other four being wide receiver Joey Galloway, running back Warrick Dunn and linebackers Derrick Brooks and Cato June.

In his twelve-season NFL career, Hilliard appeared in 161 regular-season games, starting in 105, and made 546 catches for 6,397 yards and thirty-five touchdowns. He also had 126 rushing yards on sixteen attempts.

== NFL career statistics ==
Legend
	Led the league
**Bold**	Career high

=== Regular season ===
Year	Team	Games		Receiving						Punt Returns						Fumbles	
Year	Team	GP	GS	Tgt	Rec	Yds	Avg	Lng	TD	PR	Yds	Avg	Lng	TD	FC	Fum	Lost
1997	NYG	2	2	5	2	42	**21.0**	23	0	—	—	—	—	—	—	0	0
1998	NYG	**16**	**16**	105	51	715	14.0	50	2	—	—	—	—	—	—	2	**2**
1999	NYG	**16**	**16**	**121**	**72**	**996**	13.8	46	3	—	—	—	—	—	—	0	0
2000	NYG	14	14	106	55	787	14.3	**59**	**8**	—	—	—	—	—	—	0	0
2001	NYG	14	10	87	52	659	12.7	38	6	—	—	—	—	—	—	0	0
2002	NYG	7	7	47	27	386	14.3	38	2	—	—	—	—	—	—	0	0
2003	NYG	13	12	102	60	608	10.1	38	6	—	—	—	—	—	—	2	**2**
2004	NYG	**16**	15	81	49	437	8.9	43	0	4	26	6.5	15	0	0	**3**	1
2005	TB	**16**	2	53	35	282	8.1	22	1	—	—	—	—	—	—	0	0
2006	TB	**16**	0	55	34	339	10.0	44	2	**24**	**163**	**6.8**	16	0	3	0	0
2007	TB	15	10	86	62	722	11.6	56	1	15	92	6.1	**20**	0	4	2	**2**
2008	TB	**16**	2	58	47	424	9.0	36	4	3	19	6.3	11	0	**7**	1	1
Career		161	106	906	546	6,397	11.7	59	35	46	300	6.5	20	0	14	10	8

=== Postseason ===
Year	Team	Games		Receiving						Punt Returns						Fumbles	
Year	Team	GP	GS	Tgt	Rec	Yds	Avg	Lng	TD	PR	Yds	Avg	Lng	TD	FC	Fum	Lost
2000	NYG	**3**	**3**	**28**	**16**	**220**	**13.8**	**46**	**2**	**6**	**37**	**6.2**	**19**	0	**3**	0	0
2005	TB	1	0	4	4	38	9.5	19	0	—	—	—	—	—	—	0	0
2007	TB	1	0	6	4	27	6.8	9	0	2	5	2.5	4	0	2	0	0
Career		5	3	38	24	285	11.9	46	2	8	42	5.3	19	0		0	0

== Coaching career ==
=== Florida Tuskers ===
Forced to retire after a string of injuries and nine surgeries, Hilliard became a volunteer receivers coach for the UFL's Florida Tuskers, a charter UFL franchise based in Orlando, Florida. In 2010, he became the Tuskers' new wide receivers coach for the season. He worked alongside head coach Jim Haslett and offensive coordinator Jay Gruden. The Tuskers appeared in the first two UFL championship games, losing both to the Las Vegas Locomotives. In 2010, the league suspended the Tuskers' operations and moved the remnants of the team to Virginia Beach to assume the identity (and some executive staff) of a previously announced expansion team that was to begin play in 2011.

=== Miami Dolphins ===
In 2011, Hilliard returned to the NFL as an assistant wide receivers coach for the Miami Dolphins under head coach Tony Sparano, assisting in the development of Brandon Marshall and Brian Hartline.

=== Washington Redskins ===
In 2012, Hilliard was hired by Mike Shanahan of the Washington Redskins as the wide receivers coach. He oversaw a unit that had four wide receivers with at least 500 receiving yards or more (Santana Moss, Leonard Hankerson, Josh Morgan and Pierre Garçon). The Redskins ended the regular season with a 7-game winning streak to finish with a 10–6 record, leading to a NFC East division championship and a fourth-seed spot in the playoffs. It was their first division title since 1999.

=== Buffalo Bills ===
In 2013, the Buffalo Bills hired Hilliard as the wide receivers coach. Hilliard oversaw a young group of receivers that included veteran Steve Johnson and rookies Robert Woods and Marquise Goodwin.

=== Washington Redskins ===
In January 2014, Hilliard was hired by Jay Gruden as the wide receivers coach of the Washington Redskins. In his second stint with the Redskins, Hilliard led a veteran unit that included Pierre Garçon, DeSean Jackson and Santana Moss. In the 2015 season, the Redskins returned to the playoffs for the first time since 2012. The Redskins went on a four-game winning streak to finish the season, and they won the NFC East with a 9–7 record. However, the Redskins lost to the Green Bay Packers in the Wild Card round 35–18. During the 2019 season, Hilliard helped to develop a group of rookie receivers that included Terry McLaurin, Kelvin Harmon and Steven Sims. McLaurin finished the season with 58 receptions for 919 yards and seven touchdowns and was named to the PFWA All-Rookie Team.

=== Pittsburgh Steelers ===
Hilliard joined the Pittsburgh Steelers to be their wide receivers coach in February 2020. Rookie Chase Claypool was selected by the Pittsburgh Steelers in the second round, 49th overall, in the 2020 NFL draft as the team's first selection. Under Hilliard, Claypool became the first Steelers rookie in franchise history to score four touchdowns in a game, and the first Steeler since Roy Jefferson in 1968 to do so. Claypool also became the only wide receiver in NFL history to accomplish this feat in the same game. His performance helped the team start out with a 4–0 record for the first time since 1979. Under Hilliard, WR Diontae Johnson finished the 2021 season with 107 receptions for 1,161 receiving yards and eight receiving touchdowns in 16 games. Johnson was then named to his first Pro Bowl, replacing Bengals receiver Ja'Marr Chase. Following the 2021 season, Hilliard's contract was not renewed by the team.

=== Auburn Tigers ===
Hilliard was hired on February 23, 2022, to be Auburn's new wide receivers coach. After the dismissal of head coach Bryan Harsin in October 2022, Hilliard was named interim co-offensive coordinator alongside offensive line coach Will Friend for the remainder of the season. He was not retained after the 2022 season upon the hiring of new head coach Hugh Freeze.

=== Atlanta Falcons ===
Hilliard was named the wide receivers coach of the Atlanta Falcons on February 1, 2024. On September 22, 2025, the Falcons parted ways with Hilliard one day after a 30-0 blowout loss to the Carolina Panthers, amid ongoing offensive struggles that extended beyond the wide receivers group.

=== California ===
Hilliard was named Co-offensive coordinator and wide receivers coach of California on January 2nd 2026.

== Personal life ==
Hilliard is the nephew of former New Orleans Saints running back Dalton Hilliard. His cousin Kenny Hilliard is also a former NFL player. He and his wife Lourdes met at the University of Florida and they have five children. After declaring for the 1997 NFL draft as a true junior and spending 23 seasons in the NFL (as a player and coach), Hilliard returned to the University of Florida to complete his degree. He worked as an NFL coach while working to complete his degree from 2013 to 2018.

== See also ==
- 1996 College Football All-America Team
- Florida Gators football, 1990–99
- History of the Tampa Bay Buccaneers
- List of Florida Gators football All-Americans
- List of Florida Gators in the NFL draft
- List of New York Giants players
- List of University of Florida Athletic Hall of Fame members
