= Dalton Hilliard =

American football player (born 1964)

No. 40, 21
- Position: Running back

Personal information
- Born: January 21, 1964 (age 62); Patterson, Louisiana, U.S.
- Listed height: 5 ft 8 in (1.73 m)
- Listed weight: 196 lb (89 kg)

Career information
- High school: Patterson
- College: LSU
- NFL draft: 1986: 2nd round, 31st overall pick

Career history
- New Orleans Saints (1986–1993)

Awards and highlights
- Second-team All-Pro (1989); Pro Bowl (1989); New Orleans Saints Hall of Fame; 3× First-team All-SEC (1982, 1984, 1985); Louisiana Sports Hall of Fame

Career NFL statistics
- Rushing yards: 4,164
- Average: 3.7
- Total touchdowns: 53
- Stats at Pro Football Reference

Dalton Andrea Hilliard (born January 21, 1964) is an American former professional football player who spent his entire career as a running back for the New Orleans Saints of the National Football League (NFL) from 1986 to 1993. He played college football for the LSU Tigers and was selected by the Saints in the second round of the 1986 NFL draft. A Pro Bowl selection in 1989, he is a member of the New Orleans Saints Hall of Fame.

== College career ==
Hilliard played college football at Louisiana State University from 1982 to 1985. He is one of three running backs to rush for over 4,000 yards in their career at LSU. He is 5th all-time in rushing touchdowns in SEC history with 44.

College rushing statistics*
| Year | Team | GP | Rushing | | | | Receiving | | | | Scrimmage | | |
| Year | Team | GP | Att | Yds | Avg | TD | Rec | Yds | Avg | TD | Plays | Yds | TD |
|---|---|---|---|---|---|---|---|---|---|---|---|---|---|
| 1982 | LSU | 11 | 193 | 901 | 4.7 | 11 | 31 | 368 | 11.9 | 5 | 224 | 1,269 | 16 |
| 1983 | LSU | 11 | 177 | 747 | 4.2 | 6 | 31 | 248 | 8.0 | 0 | 208 | 995 | 6 |
| 1984 | LSU | 11 | 254 | 1,268 | 5.0 | 13 | 24 | 204 | 8.5 | 1 | 278 | 1,472 | 14 |
| 1985 | LSU | 11 | 258 | 1,134 | 4.4 | 14 | 34 | 313 | 9.2 | 0 | 292 | 1,447 | 14 |
| Career | LSU | 11 | 882 | 4,050 | 4.6 | 44 | 120 | 1,133 | 9.4 | 6 | 1,002 | 5,183 | 50 |

*Does not include bowl games.

== Professional career ==
Hilliard played eight seasons with the New Orleans Saints, who drafted him in the second round of the 1986 NFL draft. His most productive season came in 1989 when he rushed for 1,262 yards and scored 18 touchdowns. Hilliard became the first player in NFL history to rush for 1200 yards, catch 50 passes, score 18 touchdowns and have fewer than 8 fumbles in a single season.

== NFL career statistics ==
| Year | Team | GP | Rushing | | | | | Receiving | | | | |
| Year | Team | GP | Att | Yds | Avg | Lng | TD | Rec | Yds | Avg | Lng | TD |
|---|---|---|---|---|---|---|---|---|---|---|---|---|
| 1986 | NO | 16 | 121 | 425 | 3.5 | 36 | 5 | 17 | 107 | 6.3 | 17 | 0 |
| 1987 | NO | 12 | 123 | 508 | 4.1 | 30 | 7 | 23 | 264 | 11.5 | 38 | 1 |
| 1988 | NO | 16 | 204 | 823 | 4.0 | 36 | 5 | 34 | 335 | 9.9 | 26 | 1 |
| 1989 | NO | 16 | 334 | 1,262 | 3.7 | 40 | 13 | 52 | 514 | 9.9 | 54 | 5 |
| 1990 | NO | 6 | 90 | 284 | 3.2 | 17 | 0 | 14 | 125 | 8.9 | 20 | 1 |
| 1991 | NO | 10 | 79 | 252 | 3.2 | 65 | 4 | 21 | 127 | 6.0 | 14 | 1 |
| 1992 | NO | 16 | 115 | 445 | 3.9 | 22 | 3 | 48 | 465 | 9.7 | 41 | 4 |
| 1993 | NO | 16 | 50 | 165 | 3.3 | 16 | 2 | 40 | 296 | 7.4 | 34 | 1 |
| Career | | 108 | 1,126 | 4,164 | 3.7 | 65 | 39 | 249 | 2,233 | 9.0 | 54 | 14 |

== Personal life ==
Hilliard is from Patterson, Louisiana and lived in Destrehan, Louisiana during his playing career. He is the father of Dalton Hilliard Jr., who played football at Brother Martin High School and Nicholls State.

Hilliard is the uncle of former NFL players Ike Hilliard and Kenny Hilliard.
