= Gillis Wilson =

American football player (born 1977)

No. 92, 97, 2
- Position: Defensive end

Personal information
- Born: October 15, 1977 (age 49); Morgan City, Louisiana, U.S.
- Listed height: 6 ft 2 in (1.88 m)
- Listed weight: 282 lb (128 kg)

Career information
- High school: Patterson (Patterson, Louisiana)
- College: Southern (1996–1999)
- NFL draft: 2000: 5th round, 147th overall pick

Career history
- Carolina Panthers (2000); New York Giants (2001); Carolina Panthers (2001); Arizona Cardinals (2002)*; Rhein Fire (2003); Georgia Force (2004–2006); Kansas City Brigade (2006); Grand Rapids Rampage (2007); Kansas City Brigade (2008); Dallas Vigilantes (2010)
- * Offseason or practice squad member only

Awards and highlights
- Second-team All-Arena (2005)

Career NFL statistics
- Games played: 5
- Tackles: 9
- Sacks: 0.5
- Stats at Pro Football Reference
- Stats at ArenaFan.com

Gillis R. Wilson III (born October 15, 1977) is an American former professional football player who was a defensive end for the Carolina Panthers of the National Football League (NFL). He was selected by the Panthers in the fifth round of the 2000 NFL draft after playing college football for the Southern Jaguars.

Wilson was also a member of the New York Giants and Arizona Cardinals of the NFL, the Rhein Fire of NFL Europe, and the Georgia Force, Kansas City Brigade, Grand Rapids Rampage and Dallas Vigilantes of the Arena Football League (AFL).

== Early life and college ==
Gillis R. Wilson III was born on October 15, 1977, in Morgan City, Louisiana. He attended Patterson High School in Patterson, Louisiana.

Wilson was a member of the Southern Jaguars of Southern University from 1996 to 1999. He did not play in any games in 1996. He was inducted into the Southern University Sports Hall of Fame in 2024.

== Professional career ==
Wilson was selected by the Carolina Panthers with the 147th pick in the 2000 NFL draft. He officially signed with the team on June 8, 2000. He was released on August 27 and signed to the Panthers' practice squad two days later. Wilson was promoted to the active roster on December 20 but did not appear in any games during the 2000 NFL season. He was later released by the Panthers on August 28, 2001.

Wilson signed with the New York Giants on September 18, 2001, but was released on October 2 before playing in any games. He was signed to New York's practice squad the next day.

On November 21, 2001, the Panthers signed Wilson to the active roster off of the Giants' practice squad. He played in five games for the Panthers during the 2001 season, posting seven solo tackles, two assisted tackles, and 0.5 sacks. He became a free agent after the 2001 season.

Wilson was signed by the Arizona Cardinals on July 31, 2002. He was released on August 26, 2002.

Wilson was acquired by the Rhein Fire in the 2003 NFL Europe free agent draft. He played in one game for the Fire during the 2003 NFL Europe season.

Wilson signed with the Georgia Force of the Arena Football League (AFL) on November 26, 2003. He was an offensive lineman/defensive lineman during his time in the AFL as the league played under ironman rules. He played in 34 games for the Force from 2004 to 2006, and was named second-team All-Arena in 2005.

Wilson was traded to the Kansas City Brigade on March 20, 2006, for Abdul-Salam Noah and Dan Curran. Wilson appeared in eight games for Kansas City in 2006. He was released by the Brigade on February 26, 2007.

Wilson signed with the Grand Rapids Rampage of the AFL on March 1, 2007. He played in all 16 games for the Rampage during the 2007 season.

Wilson was signed by the Kansas City Brigade on March 6, 2008. During the 2008 season, he recorded 18 solo tackles, 20 assisted tackles, a career-high 6.5 sacks, and two pass breakups. He also caught one pass for a five-yard touchdown. The AFL folded after the 2008 season.

Wilson signed with the Dallas Vigilantes of the reformed AFL on June 8, 2010, during midseason. He posted one solo tackle, two assisted tackles, and 0.5 sacks for the Vigilantes in 2010. He finished his AFL career with totals of 69 solo tackles, 69 assisted tackles, 17.0 sacks, two forced fumbles, two fumble recoveries, nine pass breakups, one blocked kick, two carries for one yard, and four receptions for 67 yards and one touchdown.
