= Patterson High School (Louisiana) =

Location
- 2525 Main Street; Patterson, Louisiana 70392; United States; 29.7190°N 91.3070°W

Information
- School type: Public
- Founded: 1896
- School district: St. Mary Parish School Board
- Principal: Lane Larive
- Staff: 27.39 (FTE)
- Grades: 9–12
- Enrollment: 450 (2023–2024)
- Student to teacher ratio: 16.43
- Language: English
- Colors: Red and Black
- Mascot: Lumberjack
- Website: phs.stmaryk12.net

Patterson High School is a high school in unincorporated St. Mary Parish, Louisiana, United States, near the city of Patterson. It is a part of the St. Mary Parish School Board.

== Athletics ==
Patterson High competes in the LHSAA in the 3A classification in all of the following varsity sports: baseball, basketball (boys and girls), cross country (boys), football, golf, softball, swimming, tennis, track and field, and volleyball.

=== Football ===
On January 15, 2009, Kenny Hilliard, a sophomore running back at Patterson High was named ESPN RISE Sophomore Player of the Year.

== Awards ==
Patterson High was named a Blue Ribbon School in 2006 in which former principal, Michael Brocato, and head of the math department, Cathie Vernon, traveled to Washington D.C. to accept the award.

== Notable alumni ==
- Dalton Hilliard, NFL player
- Ike Hilliard, NFL player
- Kenny Hilliard, NFL player
- Gillis Wilson, NFL player
