= Wedell-Williams XP-34 =

Canceled fighter project

XP-34
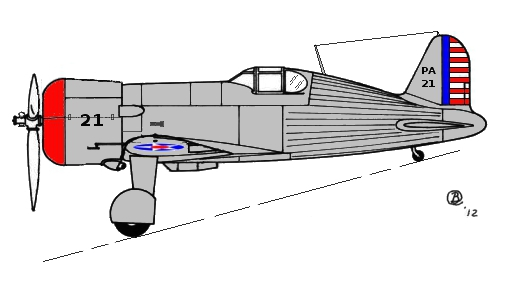
- Artist's impression of the XP-34

General information
- Type: Fighter aircraft
- National origin: United States
- Manufacturer: Wedell-Williams Air Service Corporation

History
- Developed from: Wedell-Williams Model 45

The Wedell-Williams XP-34 was a fighter aircraft design submitted to the United States Army Air Corps (USAAC) before World War II by Marguerite Clark Williams, widow of millionaire Harry P. Williams, former owner and co-founder of the Wedell-Williams Air Service Corporation.

== Design and development ==
Derived from an original proposal made in 1932, the XP-34 was based on a design by air racer Jimmy Wedell, who was considered, "one of the most noted race plane designers of its day". The aircraft was a direct result of the development of Wedell's most successful designs, the Model 44 and Model 45. The forward fuselage was intended to be metal, the after part and control surfaces covered in fabric.

The interest expressed from the USAAC was based on the success of the private racing aircraft in the 1930s that were reaching 300 mph speeds in competition, a performance level not achieved by standard aircraft types in service in the U.S. military.

On 1 October 1935, the USAAC ordered a full set of drawings and issued the XP-34 designation. It soon became apparent, however, with its original 700 hp (522 kW) Pratt & Whitney R-1535 Twin Wasp Junior engine, the anticipated performance of the XP-34 would be insufficient compared to designs already in production.

Wedell-Williams suggested substituting the 900 hp (671 kW) Pratt & Whitney XR-1830 instead. Although the promise of high speed was still there, other considerations such as the complete redesign of the airframe to accommodate a heavier and more powerful engine were considered impractical with the new design subsequently rejected by the Air Corps before any aircraft were built.

== Specifications (proposed) ==
Data from U.S. Fighters

General characteristics

- Crew: 1 pilot
- Length: 23 ft 6 in (7.2 m)
- Wingspan: 27 ft 8.5 in (8.45 m)
- Height: 10 ft 9 in (3.28 m)
- Gross weight: 4,250 lb (1,928 kg)
- Powerplant: 1 × Pratt & Whitney XR1830-C air-cooled radial , 900 hp (671 kW)

Performance

- Maximum speed: 308 mph (496 km/h, 268 kn)

== See also ==
Related development

- Wedell-Williams Model 44
- Wedell-Williams Model 45

Related lists

- List of military aircraft of the United States
