= Wedell-Williams Aviation & Cypress Sawmill Museum =

Coordinates: 29°40′39″N 91°17′39″W

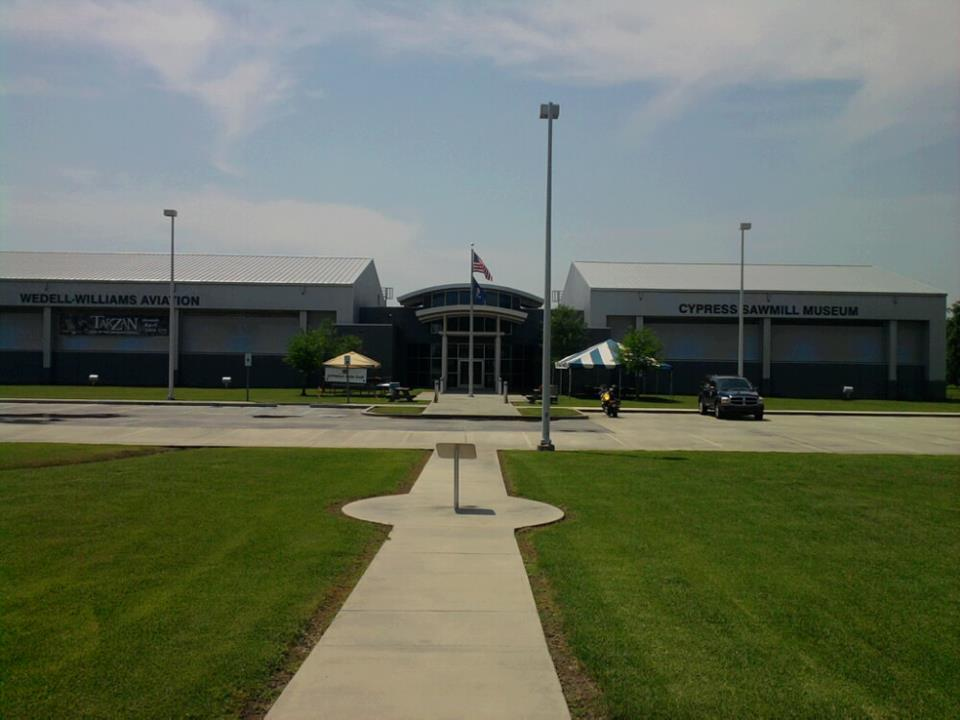
Wedell-Williams Aviation & Cypress Sawmill Museum

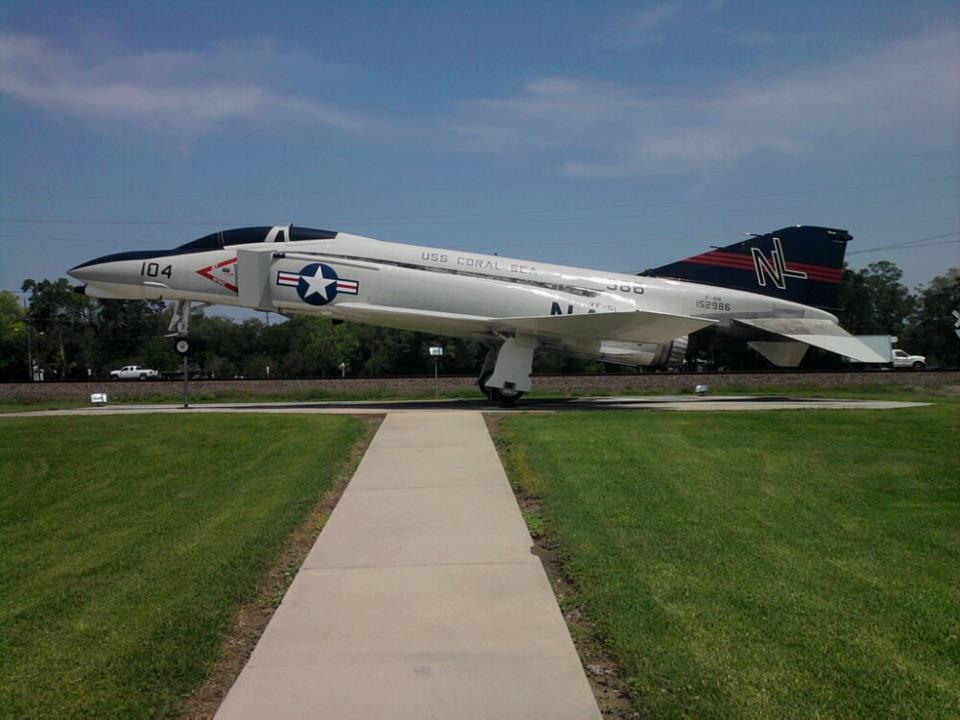
F-4 Phantom II in front of the museum

The Wedell-Williams Aviation & Cypress Sawmill Museum – Patterson is a branch of the Louisiana State Museum located at 118 Cotten Road, Patterson, Louisiana, United States. It covers the aviation and industrial history of Louisiana

== Wedell-Williams Aviation Collection ==
This collection is named after Jimmie Wedell and Harry Williams from the interwar period. It has a number of early racing airplanes and memorabilia.

A replica Wedell-Williams Model 22 was unveiled in 2014.

== Patterson Cypress Sawmill Collection ==
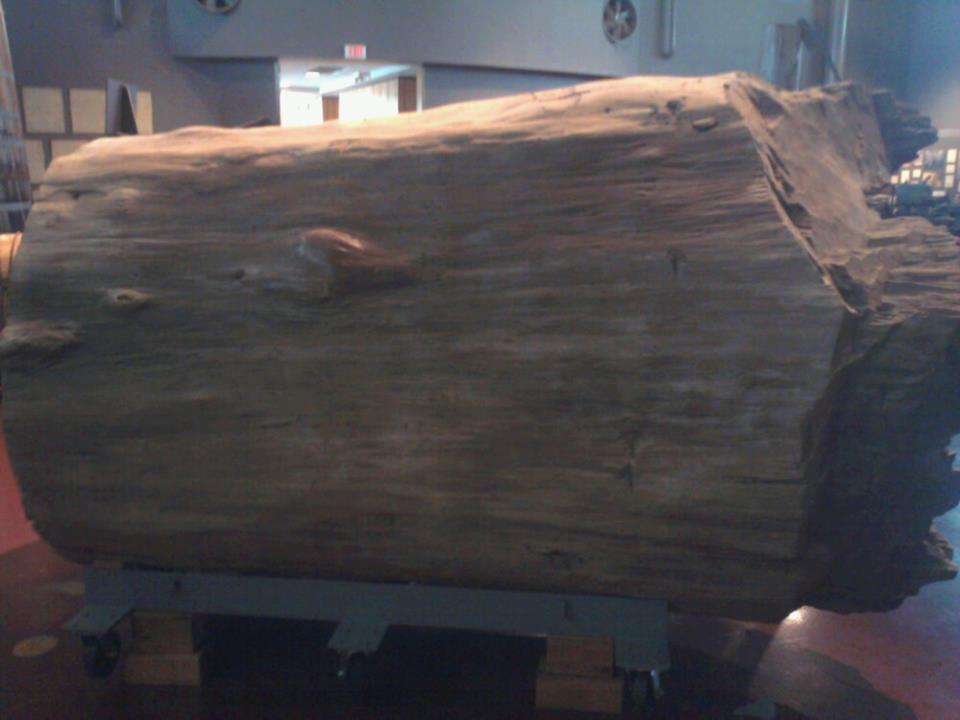
Cypress log

The industrial history of the Patterson lumberyards is illustrated by the items in this collection.
