= Patterson, Louisiana =

- City
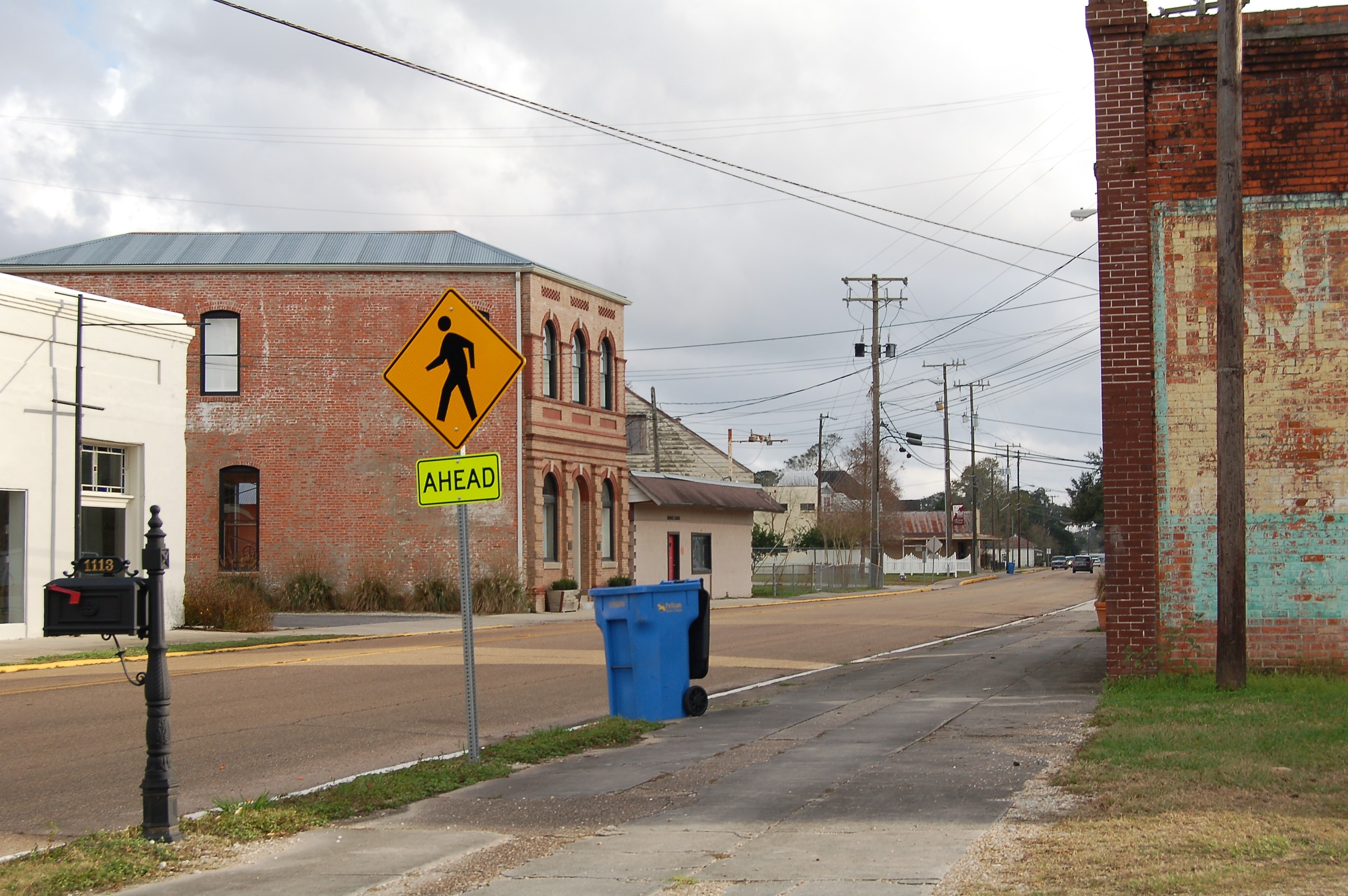

- Location of Patterson in St. Mary Parish, Louisiana.

- Location of Louisiana in the United States
- Coordinates: 29°41′33″N 91°18′24″W
- Country: United States
- State: Louisiana
- Parish: St. Mary

Government
  - Mayor: Rodney Grogan

Area
  - Total: 2.53 sq mi (6.54 km^{2})
  - Land: 2.53 sq mi (6.54 km^{2})
  - Water: 0 sq mi (0.00 km^{2})
- Elevation: 10 ft (3.0 m)

Population (2020)
  - Total: 5,931
  - Density: 2,350.1/sq mi (907.38/km^{2})
- Time zone: UTC-6 (CST)
  - Summer (DST): UTC-5 (CDT)
- Area code: 985
- FIPS code: 22-59340
- Website: cityofpattersonla.gov

Patterson is a city in St. Mary Parish, Louisiana, United States. As of the 2020 census, Patterson had a population of 5,931. It is part of the Morgan City Micropolitan Statistical Area.

== History ==
During the early 19th century, a group of Pennsylvania Dutchmen boarded a sailing vessel in New Orleans and ventured into the Bayou Teche. One of them, Hans Knight, decided to settle his family in what is now Patterson. The community was originally called Dutch Settlement, Dutch Prairie, and Dutch Town.

In 1832, Captain John Patterson, a trader from Indiana, settled there. He built a store and became a prominent citizen. The town was renamed Pattersonville after the captain successfully moved the post office to Dutch Settlement.

In 1885, the All Saints Episcopal Church was completed. It was later moved to DeQuincy, Louisiana in the 1940s.

Pattersonville was incorporated in 1907 as the Town of Patterson.

Hattie A. Watts High School was in Patterson. It served African American students and was named for a dedicated teacher and principal. A mural at Hattie A. Watts Elementary School commemorates her life.

== Geography ==
According to the United States Census Bureau, the city has a total area of 2.5 square miles (6.5 km^{2}), all land.

== Demographics ==
Historical population
Census	Pop.	Note	%±
1910	2,998		—
1920	2,538		−15.3%
1930	2,206		−13.1%
1940	1,800		−18.4%
1950	1,938		7.7%
1960	2,923		50.8%
1970	4,409		50.8%
1980	4,693		6.4%
1990	4,736		0.9%
2000	5,130		8.3%
2010	6,112		19.1%
2020	5,931		−3.0%
2025 (est.)	5,565	▼	−6.2%
U.S. Decennial Census

Patterson racial composition
Race	Number	Percentage
White (non-Hispanic)	2,740	46.2%
Black or African American (non-Hispanic)	2,559	43.15%
Native American	66	1.11%
Asian	43	0.73%
Pacific Islander	1	0.02%
Other/Mixed	260	4.38%
Hispanic or Latino	262	4.42%

As of the 2020 United States census, there were 5,931 people, 2,217 households, and 1,235 families residing in the city.

== Sports ==
Though Patterson has only been to the football championship twice, it is a traditional playoff team. Patterson is also the home of LSU and New Orleans Saints running back Dalton Hilliard (in Saints Hall of Fame) and Tampa Bay Buccaneers wide receiver Ike Hilliard.

On January 15, 2009, Kenny Hilliard was named ESPN RISE Sophomore Player of the Year.

== Government ==
Patterson uses a city council consisting of five council members. As of February 2020, the current mayor of Patterson is Rodney A. Grogan.

== Education ==
It is served by the St. Mary Parish School Board. Schools in Patterson include Hattie A. Watts Elementary School, Patterson Junior High School, and Patterson High School.

== Notable people ==
- Ralph Norman Bauer, Speaker of the Louisiana House of Representatives from 1940 to 1948, was born in Patterson in 1899
- Dalton Hilliard, running back for the New Orleans Saints
- Ike Hilliard, wide receiver for the Tampa Bay Buccaneers
- Gillis Wilson, defensive end for the Carolina Panthers

== See also ==
- Wedell-Williams Aviation & Cypress Sawmill Museum - Patterson
